= 4th Children's and Family Emmy Awards =

- Date: March 1–2, 2026
- Location: Jazz at Lincoln Center, New York City
- Presented by: National Academy of Television Arts and Sciences
- Hosted by: John Tartaglia

Highlights
- Most awards: Descendants: The Rise of Red; Win or Lose (5)
- Most nominations: Star Wars: Skeleton Crew (17)
- Outstanding Preschool, Children's or Family Viewing Series: Sesame Street
- Outstanding Young Teen Series: Star Wars: Skeleton Crew

The 4th Children's and Family Emmy Awards are an awards ceremony presented by the National Academy of Television Arts and Sciences (NATAS), to honor the best in American children's and family-oriented television programming in 2024 and 2025, following on from the 3rd Children's and Family Emmy Awards, which were held in March 2025. The eligibility period ran from June 1, 2024, to May 31, 2025, mirroring that of the Primetime Emmy Awards.

The winners were announced during two ceremonies held at Jazz at Lincoln Center in New York City on March 1–2, 2026, one focused on creative and technical arts and the other dedicated to performances and programming. Star Wars: Skeleton Crew led the nominations, with seventeen, breaking the record of sixteen made by Percy Jackson and the Olympians at the previous ceremony. Skeleton Crew was followed by Sweet Tooth with fourteen nominations, and Descendants: The Rise of Red with eleven. The Lifetime Achievement Award is presented to science educator Bill Nye.

== Ceremony information ==
=== Category changes ===
A number of changes to categories and eligibility criteria took effect for the 3rd Children's and Family Emmy Awards:

- The Outstanding Informational Program is returning.
- The Outstanding Voice Performer in an Animated Program category has been split into two categories each for Single Role Voice Performance and Multiple Role Voice Performance. Entrants into the Single Role Voice Performance category must be voicing only a singular character - they cannot choose only to enter a single voice from a show in which they voice multiple characters. The Outstanding Younger Performer remains unchanged.
- Due to a consistently low number of submissions, the Outstanding Preschool Series category has been merged with Outstanding Children's or Family Viewing Series. The category has now been renamed Outstanding Preschool, Children's or Family Viewing Series.
- The Outstanding Interactive Media category has been removed.
- The Outstanding Art Direction/Set Decoration/Scenic Design for a Single Camera Program and Outstanding Art Direction/Set Decoration/Scenic Design for a Multiple Camera Program categories have been merged into a singular category.

== Winners and nominees ==
Nominees were announced on November 18, 2025. Winners were announced on March 2, 2026.

=== Programming ===
Programming
Outstanding Preschool, Children's, or Family Viewing Series: Sesame Street (HBO Max); Jane (Apple TV+); Kids Baking Championship (Food Network); Ms. Rachel (YouTube); Odd Squad (PBS Kids); Tab Time (YouTube)	Outstanding Young Teen Series: Star Wars: Skeleton Crew (Disney+); Goosebumps: The Vanishing (Disney+); Heartstopper (Netflix); Sweet Tooth (Netflix); Time Bandits (Apple TV+)
Outstanding Preschool Animated Series: The Tiny Chef Show (Nickelodeon); Carl the Collector (PBS Kids); Daniel Tiger's Neighborhood (PBS Kids); Molly of Denali (PBS Kids); Xavier Riddle and the Secret Museum (PBS Kids)	Outstanding Children's or Young Teen Animated Series: Win or Lose (Disney+); Big City Greens (Disney+); Dream Productions (Disney+); Wolf King (Netflix); Wylde Pak (Nickelodeon)
Outstanding Fiction Special: Descendants: The Rise of Red (Disney+); Alexander and the Terrible, Horrible, No Good, Very Bad Road Trip (Disney+); Girl Haunts Boy (Fifth Season); Henry Danger: The Movie (Nickelodeon)	Outstanding Animated Special: Ultraman: Rising (Netflix); An Almost Christmas Story (Disney+); Kiff: The Haunting of Miss McGravy's House (Disney+); Kiff: Lore of the Ring Light (Disney+); That Christmas (Locksmith Animation and Netflix)
Outstanding Live Action Short Form Program: Andrew Garfield and Elmo Explain Grief (Sesame Workshop); Girls' Voices Now (Here TV); My Way (PBS Kids); Together We Can (PBS Kids)	Outstanding Animated Short Form Program: Daffy in Wackyland (HBO/HBO Max); Acoustic Rooster: Jazzy Jams (PBS Kids); Count on June Bug (Thirteen); Eva the Owlet (Apple TV+); How Not to Draw (Disney+); Road Trip (Disney+)
Outstanding Informational Program: A Real Bug's Life (National Geographic/Disney+); Building Outside the Lines (Magnolia Network); Harlem Ice (Disney+); Makayla's Voice: A Letter to the World (Netflix); Super Animals (Fox)

=== Performances ===
Performer
Outstanding Lead Performer in a Preschool, Children's or Young Teen Program: Joe Locke as Charlie Spring on Heartstopper (Netflix); Kit Connor as Nick Nelson on Heartstopper (Netflix); Danya Griver as Gwendoline Mary Lacy on Malory Towers (BYUtv); Lisa Kudrow as Penelope on Time Bandits (Apple TV+); Jude Law as Jod Na Nawood on Star Wars: Skeleton Crew (Disney+); David Schwimmer as Anthony Brewer on Goosebumps: The Vanishing (Disney+); Nina Toussaint-White as Sarah Robinson on The Primrose Railway Children (BYUtv)	Outstanding Supporting Performer in a Preschool, Children's or Young Teen Program: Nonso Anozie as Tommy Jepperd on Sweet Tooth (Netflix); Rosalind Chao as Helen Zhang on Sweet Tooth (Netflix); Ellie Goldstein as Nancy on Malory Towers (BYUtv); Stefania LaVie Owen as Bear on Sweet Tooth (Netflix); Dara Reneé as Uliana on Descendants: The Rise of Red (Disney+)
Outstanding Younger Performer in a Preschool, Children's or Young Teen Program: Christian Convery as Gus on Sweet Tooth (Netflix); Ravi Cabot-Conyers as Wim on Star Wars: Skeleton Crew (Disney+); Lucian-River Chauhan as Ben on Me (Apple TV+); Ava Joyce McCarthy as Phoebe Robinson on The Primrose Railway Children (BYUtv); Naledi Murray as Wendy on Sweet Tooth (Netflix); April V. Woods as Felicity Rivers on Malory Towers (BYUtv)	Outstanding Children's Personality: Tabitha Brown – Tab Time (YouTube); Yvette Nicole Brown – Cookie Monster's Bake Sale: Block Party (HBO Max); Perdita Felicien – All-Round Champion (BYUtv); Alia Pope – Chip Kids (East Tennessee PBS); June Squibb – Storyline Online (YouTube)
Outstanding Voice Performer in a Preschool Program: Ana Gasteyer as Crabitha on RoboGobo (Disney+); Pamela Adlon as Aunt Lola on SuperKitties: Bossy Birdy (Disney+); Dee Bradley Baker as Nubs & Zeephoz on Star Wars: Young Jedi Adventures (Disney+); Jay Thomas Manuel as Jeff Mouse on Donkey Hodie (PBS Kids); Amber Riley as Ursula on Ariel (Disney+)	Outstanding Younger Voice Performer in a Preschool, Children's or Young Teen Program: Christopher Sean Cooper Jr. as Tate on Wonder Pets: In the City (Apple TV+); Summer Rose Castillo as Alma on Alma's Way (PBS Kids); Vanessa Huszar as Zuri on Wonder Pets: In the City (Apple TV+); Chanel Stewart as Kai on Win or Lose (Disney+); Kensington Tallman as Riley on Dream Productions (Disney+); Alkaio Thiele as Peter Parker / Spidey on Spidey and His Amazing Friends (Disney+); Ja'Siah Young as Dax on RoboGobo (Disney+)
Outstanding Single Voice Role Performer in a Children's or Young Teen Program: John Lithgow as Bolinar on Spellbound (Netflix); Erik Dellums as Aaravos on The Dragon Prince (Netflix); Cynthia Erivo as The Slink on RoboGobo (Disney+); Ernie Hudson as Marlon on Angry Birds Mystery Island (Amazon Prime Video); John C. Reilly as The Folk Singer on An Almost Christmas Story (Disney+); Maya Rudolph as Jean on Dream Productions (Disney+)	Outstanding Multiple Role Voice Performer in a Children's or Young Teen Program: David Errigo Jr. as Hamton J Pig & Plucky Duck on Tiny Toons Looniversity (HBO/HBO Max); Eric Bauza as Daffy Duck & The Do-Do on Daffy in Wackyland (HBO/HBO Max); H. Michael Croner as Barry Buns, Rat, Chubbles Wubbington, Soda Jerk & Buffalo Security on Kiff (Disney+); Kate Mulgrew as Admiral Janeway & Janeway Hologram on Star Trek: Prodigy (Netflix); Kari Wahlgren as Evelyn & Mrs. Grant on Legends of Evergreen Hills (Chick-fil-A Play App)
Outstanding Puppeteer Performer: Leslie Carrara-Rudolph as Abby Cadabby & Tango on Sesame Street (HBO Max); Frankie Cordero as Purple Panda, Turtle-Lou & Penguin Referee on Donkey Hodie (PBS Kids); Stephanie D'Abruzzo as Duck Duck, Harriet Elizabeth Cow, Mama Panda & Doc Skunk on Donkey Hodie (PBS Kids); Ryan Dillon as Elmo & Felix on Sesame Street (HBO Max); Carmen Osbahr as Rosita on Sesame Street (HBO Max)

=== Writing ===
Writing
Outstanding Writing for a Preschool or Children's Program: Tab Time: "When We Lose Someone" – Sean Presan (YouTube); A Real Bug's Life: "Love in the Forest" – John Capener and Euan McDonald Smith (National Geographic); Jane: "Pan troglodytes" – Tiffany Hsiung and J.J. Johnson (Apple TV+); Ms. Rachel: "Potty Training with Ms. Rachel" – Aron Accurso and Rachel Accurso (YouTube); Odd Squad: "Odd Ones In" – Mark de Angelis (PBS Kids); Secrets at Red Rocks: "People We Care About" – Martha Hardy-Ward (BYUtv)	Outstanding Writing for a Young Teen Program: Heartstopper: "Journey" – Alice Oseman (Netflix); Goosebumps: The Vanishing: "Stay Out of the Basement, Part I" – Rob Letterman and Hilary Winston (Disney+); Me: "Pilot" – Barry L. Levy (Apple TV+); Star Wars: Skeleton Crew: "This Could Be a Real Adventure" – Christopher Ford and Jon Watts (Disney+); Sweet Tooth: "This Is a Story" – Jim Mickle (Netflix); Time Bandits: "Kevin Haddock" – Jemaine Clement, Iain Morris, and Taika Waititi (Apple TV+)
Outstanding Writing for a Preschool Animated Program: Carl the Collector: "The Fall" – Adam Rudman and Ava X. Rigelhaupt (PBS Kids); Daniel Tiger's Neighborhood: "Daniel Finds Out What's Fair" – Jill Cozza-Turner and Kerry Crowley (PBS Kids); Molly of Denali: "Thanks-For-Giving" – Raye Lankford and Vera Starbard (PBS Kids); The Tiny Chef Show: "Tiny Chef's Spooky Stump Spectacular" – Leah Gotcsik and Lucas Mills (Nickelodeon); Wonder Pets: In the City: "Save the Runaway Egg" – Steve Altiere and Billy Lopez (Apple TV+)	Outstanding Writing for an Animated Program: Win or Lose: "Pickle" – Carrie Hobson and Michael Yates (Disney+); Goldie: "Frand or Foe" – Emily Brundige (Apple TV+); Jentry Chau vs. the Underworld: "Worst Birthday Ever" – James Hamilton and Echo Wu (Netflix); Moon Girl and Devil Dinosaur: "Crushed" – Liz Hara (Disney+); Star Trek: Prodigy: "The Devourer of All Things, Part I" – Jennifer Muro (Netflix)

=== Directing ===
Directing
Outstanding Directing for a Live Action Series: Sesame Street: "A Trip to the Moon" – Noel MacNeal, Liliana Olszewski, Scott Preston, and Brittany Scott Smith (HBO Max); A Real Bug's Life: "Love in the Forest" – John Capener and Euan McDonald Smith (Disney+); Goosebumps: The Vanishing: "Stay Out of the Basement, Part I" – Rob Letterman (Disney+); Heartstopper: "Journey" – Andy Newbury (Netflix); Malory Towers: "The Chamber" – Jack Jameson (BYUtv); Star Wars: Skeleton Crew: "This Could Be a Real Adventure" – Jon Watts (Disney+); Time Bandits: "Kevin Haddock" – Taika Waititi (Apple TV+)	Outstanding Directing for an Animated Series: Win or Lose: "Home" – Lou Hamou-Lhadj, Carrie Hobson, and Michael Yates (Disney+); Dream Productions: "Part 4: A Night to Remember" – Mike Jones (Disney+); Jentry Chau vs. the Underworld: "Worst Birthday Ever" – Alexandria Kwan and Natasha Presler-Wicke (Netflix); Max & The Midknights: "Welcome to Byjovia" – David Skelly, Chris Perry, Elizabeth Golan, Paola Lecler, Francis Patterson, and Shay Stone (Nickelodeon); Moon Girl and Devil Dinosaur: "Guess Who's Coming to Dinner" – Samantha Suyi Lee, Annie J. Li, Christine Liu and Jen Dickinson (Disney+); Wolf King: "The Rise of the Wolf" – Tom Brass (Netflix)
Outstanding Directing for a Preschool Animated Series: The Tiny Chef Show: "Tiny Chef's Spooky Stump Spectacular" – Rob Shaw (Nickelodeon); Batwheels: "The Ulti-Bat Rises" – Antoine Charreyron and Vaughn Ross (HBO/HBO Max); Star Wars: Young Jedi Adventures: "The Battle of Tenoo" – Anthony Bell, Shellie Kvilvang-O'Brien, Casey Lowe, and Elliot M. Bour (Disney+); Super Duper Bunny League: "Auntie Freeze!"/"Goin' Camping" – Daniel Klein and Jasmi Ritola (Nickelodeon); Wonder Pets: In the City: "Save Tate?" – Tom Gray and Pete McEvoy (Apple TV+)	Outstanding Voice Directing for an Animated Series: Your Friendly Neighborhood Spider-Man: "If This Be My Destiny..." – Sara Jane Sherman (Disney+); Goldie: "Petey the Stargazer" – Kristi Reed (Apple TV+); Kiff: "Up All Night"/"Rotten Banana"– H. Michael Croner (Disney Channel); Moon Girl and Devil Dinosaur: "Shoot for the Moon" – Sam Riegel (Disney Channel); StuGo: "Francis Want to Be Alone"/"The Sash" – Kristi Reed (Disney Channel); Wonder Pets: In the City: "Save the Roly Poly!" – Holly Gregory, Jeffrey Lesser and Benjie Randall (Apple TV+)

=== Animation ===
Individual Achievement in Animation
- Carl the Collector – Outstanding Public Service Initiative (PBS Kids)
- Daffy in Wackyland – Character Animation: Max Winston (HBO/HBO Max)
- Jentry Chau vs. the Underworld – Character Design: Kaloyan Athannassov (Netflix)
- Spellbound – Production Design: Brett Nystul (Netflix)
- Star Trek: Prodigy – Background Design: Bastien Grivet (Netflix)
- Tales of the Teenage Mutant Ninja Turtles – Color: Mark Anthony Mohamed (Paramount+)
- Ultraman: Rising – Character Animation: James Saunders (Netflix)
- Win or Lose – Storyboard: Esteban Bravo (Disney+)

=== Art Direction ===
Art Direction
Outstanding Art Direction/Set Decoration/Scenic Design
- Descendants: The Rise of Red – Mark Hofeling, Hunter Brown, Devita Walker, and MaryAnn George (Disney+)
  - Goosebumps: The Vanishing: "Welcome to Camp Nightmare" – Bret August Tanzer, Marissa Kotsilimbas, Lauren Crawford and Zebah Pinkham (Disney+)
  - Star Wars: Skeleton Crew: "You Have a Lot to Learn About Pirates" – Doug Chiang, Oliver Scholl, William Budge, Kevin Gilbert, Erik Osusky, Rachel Rockstroh, Dustin James Tiberend, Gene Serdena, Chris Arnold, Dawn Brown, Dan Jennings, Joseph Ramiro, Walter Schneider, Julie Vash, Brian Waits, and David Lazan (Disney+)
  - Surprise and Seek: "Messiest. Episode. Ever!" – Chris Roberts (Prime Video/Amazon Kids+)
  - Time Bandits: "Kevin Haddock" – Ra Vincent, Kathryn Lim, and Brendan Hefferman (Apple TV+)
  - Wizards Beyond Waverly Place: "Everything Is Not What It Seems" – Glenda Rovello, Arthur Chadwick, and Amy Feldman (Disney+/Disney Channel)

=== Casting ===
Casting
Outstanding Casting for a Live-Action Program: The Primrose Railway Children – Katy Covell, Anna Dawson, Ollie Gilbert, and Simone Pereira Hind (BYUtv); Descendants: The Rise of Red – Craig Fincannon, Lisa Mae Fincannon, Alexis Frank Koczara, Christine Smith Shevchenko, Kimberly Wistedt, Becca Burgess and Gianna Butler (Disney+); Goosebumps: The Vanishing – Rachel Goldman, Nicole Abellera Hallman, Jeanne McCarthy, Tara David (Disney+); Malory Towers – Rob Kelly (BYUtv); Star Wars: Skeleton Crew – Sarah Halley Finn and Rachel Nadler (Disney+); Sweet Tooth – Carmen Cuba and Stu Turner (Netflix)	Outstanding Casting for an Animated Program: Dream Productions – Kate Hansen-Birnbaum, Natalie Lyon, Kevin Reher, and Lexi Diamond (Disney+); An Almost Christmas Story – Dylan Jury and Debra Zane (Disney+); RoboGobo – Maria Estrada (Disney+); Spellbound – Jason Henkel (Netflix); Win or Lose – Kate Hansen-Birnbaum, Natalie Lyon, Kevin Reher, and Lexi Diamond (Disney+)

=== Choreography and Stunts ===
Choreography
Outstanding Choreography: Descendants: The Rise of Red – Ashley Wallen (Disney+); Henry Danger: The Movie – Heather Laura Gray (Nickelodeon); Nickelodeon Kids' Choice Awards 2024 – Meisha Lee, Ferly Prado, and Michael Schwandt (Nickelodeon); XO, Kitty – Ham G, Hyun Moon Kim, and Jang Hyoung Shin (Netflix)	Outstanding Stunt Coordination for a Live Action Program: Sweet Tooth – Steve McQuillan (Netflix); Beyond Black Beauty – Don Stockford (Prime Video); Descendants: The Rise of Red – Chelsea Bruland (Disney+); Goosebumps: The Vanishing – Jared Burke (Disney+); Henry Danger: The Movie – Yusuf A. Ahmed, Andrew Chin, and Bruce Crawford (Nickelodeon); Star Wars: Skeleton Crew – George Cottle and Colin Follenweide (Disney+)

=== Cinematography and Lighting ===
Cinematography
Outstanding Cinematography and Technical Arts for a Single Camera Live Action Program: Sweet Tooth: "The Road Ends Here" – Dave Garbett (Netflix); A Real Bug's Life: "Love in the Forest" – Ben Cherry, Martin Dohrn, Andrew Fleming, Doug Gardner, Katherine Hannaford, Robert Hollingworth, and Mark Payne-Gill (National Geographic); A Real Bug's Life: "Tiny Heroes Down Under" – Mark Broadbent, Tai Inoue, Peter Nearhos, and Romilly Spiers (National Geographic); Star Wars: Skeleton Crew: "This Could Be a Real Adventure" – Sean Porter Campbell (Disney+)	Outstanding Cinematography and Technical Arts for a Multiple Camera Live Action Program: Bunk'd: Learning the Ropes: "Happy Trails" – Gary W. Scott (Disney+/Disney Channel); Sesame Street: "A Trip to the Moon" – Tom Guadarrama, Dan Kelley, Mark Britt, Jerry Cancel, Shaun Harkins, Mark Renaudin, and Lewis Rothenberg (HBO Max); Wizards Beyond Waverly Place: "Nigh is Now" – Clifford Jones (Disney+/Disney Channel)

=== Costumes, Makeup and Hairstyling ===
Styling
Outstanding Costume Design/Styling: Dandyland: "Joy" – Rafaella Rabinovich (YouTube); Descendants: The Rise of Red – Aliyah B. Kirkland, Julia Caston, Emilio Sosa, and Allison Choi Braun (Disney+); Star Wars: Skeleton Crew: "Way, Way Out Past the Barrier" – Dan Bronson, Louise Mingenbach, Cindy Rosenthal, and Karen Mason (Disney+); Sweet Tooth: "Here, There Be Monsters" – Sarah Goodhue, Amanda Neale, Grant Lehmann, Jason Docherty, and Jane O'Kane (Netflix); Yo Gabba Gabbaland!: "Me" – Shantell Guy-Rolfe, Heather Gaither and Julia Knapp, and Dallin Blankenship (Apple TV+)	Outstanding Makeup and Hairstyling: Descendants: The Rise of Red – Andrea Jackson, Sherriere Ashante, Antoinette Black, O'Dena Gibson, Evan Hynes, Nikk Nelson, Paul Cha, Essie Cha, Caroline Monge, Alex Lucas, Gaby Torell, and Steven Weaver (Disney+); Beyond Black Beauty: "Losing My Religion" – Patricia Cuthbert and Roxanne de Nobrega (Prime Video); Star Wars: Skeleton Crew: "Zero Friends Again" – Matt Danon, Richard Dealba, Roxane Griffin, Margarita Pidgeon, Gail Ryan, Jackie Zavala, Veronica Rodarte, Michelle Sfarzo, Adina Sullivan, Nanxy Tong, Sonia Cabrera, Lane Friedman, Samantha Ward, Bruce Spaulding Fuller, Crystal Gomez, Ian Goodwin, Mike Mekash, Ana Gabriela Quinonez Urrego, Scott Stoddard, Alexei Dmitriew and Cristina Waltz (Disney+); Sweet Tooth: "Here, There Be Monsters" – Lisa Foothead, Shannon Sinton, Aly Webby, Stefan Knight, Jacqui Leung, Mitzi Doney, Stefan Knight, Jason Docherty, Vanya Pell, Shay Lawrence, Justin Raleigh, and Jane O'Kane (Netflix); Time Bandits: "Kevin Haddock" – Nancy Hennah (Apple TV+)

=== Editing ===
Editing
Outstanding Editing for a Preschool or Children's Live Action Program: A Real Bug's Life: "Love in the Forest" – David McCann (National Geographic); Jane: "Pan troglodytes" – Heath Fashina (Apple TV+); Secrets at Red Rocks: "People We Care About" – Alex Boyd (BYUtv); Sesame Street: "Abby Taps into Kindness" – Ed Kulzer and Chris Reinhart (HBO Max); The Primrose Railway Children – Conor Meechan (BYUtv)	Outstanding Editing for a Young Teen Live Action Program: Star Wars: Skeleton Crew: "The Real Good Guys" – Andrew S. Eisen (Disney+); Makayla's Voice: A Letter to the World – Jeff Jay (Netflix); Star Wars: Skeleton Crew: "We're Gonna Be In So Much Trouble" – Katheryn Naranjo (Disney+); Star Wars: Skeleton Crew: "You Have a Lot to Learn About Pirates" – Terel Gibson (Disney+); Sweet Tooth: "This is a Story" – Michael Berenbaum (Netflix)
Outstanding Editing for a Preschool Animated Program: The Tiny Chef Show: "Tiny Chef's Spooky Stump Spectacular" – Hamilton Barrett, Mandy Hutchings, and Holly Klein (Nickelodeon); Eva the Owlet: "Adventure Night" – Martha Meyler, Ultan Murphy, Eoghan O'Neill, and Peter Williams (Apple TV+); Star Wars: Young Jedi Adventures: "The Battle of Tenoo" – Brian Dawley, Louis Legge, and Joe Stucky (Disney+); Spidey and His Amazing Friends: "Moon Girl and the Dino Dilemma / Hulk's Squirrely Switch" – Rachel Guergis, Sophia Loffreda, Kallan Treadwell, and Bec Cranswick (Disney+); Gabby's Dollhouse: "Pillow Cat Can't Sleep" – Jeff Dirdack, Michael Rossetti, Mary Hutson, Dean Jackson, and Austin Rocco (Netflix); The Creature Cases: "The Spider's Stolen Silk" – Malek Mroueh (Netflix); Batwheels: "The Ulti-Bat Rises" – Kyle Stafford and Ryan Samsam (HBO/HBO Max)	Outstanding Editing for an Animated Program: Win or Lose: "Mixed Signals" – Greg Amundson and Ayse Dedeoglu Arkali (Disney+); An Almost Christmas Story – Mike Melendi (Disney+); Dream Productions: "A Night to Remember" – Tim Fox and Katie Schaefer Bishop (Disney+); Spellbound – Susan Fitzer (Netflix); That Christmas – Sim Evan-Jones (Locksmith Animation and Netflix)

=== Music ===
Music
Outstanding Music Direction and Composition for a Live Action Program: Secrets at Red Rocks: "Open Your Mind a Little" – Stephen Gallagher and David Long (BYUtv); Descendants: The Rise of Red – Torin Borrowdale (Disney+); Goosebumps: The Vanishing: "Welcome to Camp Nightmare" – Andy Grush, Taylor Stewart, Manish Raval, and Tom Wolfe (Disney+); Henry Danger: The Movie – Paul Edward-Francis and Laura Webb (Nickelodeon); A Real Bug's Life: "Love in the Forest" – Mark Mothersbaugh, James Bladon, Steve Griffen, and Aurélie Webb (National Geographic)	Outstanding Music Direction and Composition for an Animated Program: WondLa: "Heart" - Joy Ngiaw (Apple TV+); Dream Productions: "A Night to Remember" - Nami Melumad (Disney+); Gremlins: The Wild Batch: "There's Always a Fortune in the Cookie Factory" - Sherri Chung (HBO/HBO Max); Spellbound - Alan Menken, Michael Kosarin, Celeste Chada and Brett Swain (Netflix); That Christmas - John Powell (Locksmith Animation and Netflix)
Outstanding Original Song for a Preschool Program: Rise Up, Sing Out: "Grow Your World" – Shridhar Solanki and Matthew Tishler (Disney+); Acoustic Rooster and His Barnyard Band: "I'm on My Way" – Mark McLean, Kwame Alexander and Kay Donmyer (PBS Kids); Ariel: "One Colorful Ocean" – Chantry Johnson, Rosemarie Tan, and Michelle Zarlenga (Disney+); Kindergarten: The Musical: "I Want To Go Home" – Kay Hanley, Michelle Lewis, Charlton Pettus, and Dan Petty (Disney+); RoboGobo: "The Show Will Go On" – Rob Cantor (Disney+); Sesame Street: "Music, Music" – Sam Hollander and Raye Lankford (HBO Max)	Outstanding Original Song for a Children's and Young Teen Program: Descendants: The Rise of Red: "Red Christmas" – Jeannie Lurie and Matthew Tishler (Disney+); Descendants: The Rise of Red: "Red" – Adam Schmalholz, Thomas Sturges, Antonina Armato and Tim James (Disney+); Girl Haunts Boy: "Still Haunted By You" – Cheche Alara and Justin Kawika Young (Fifth Season); Spellbound: "The Way It Was Before" – Alan Menken and Glenn Slater (Netflix); Ultraman: Rising: "No Better" – Trey Cambell, Alicia Creti, and Spencer Stewart (Netflix); Zombies: The Re-Animated Series: "It's Okay" – Elliott Maya, Chantry Johnson and Michelle Zarlenga (Disney+)

=== Show Open ===
Main Title
Outstanding Show Open
- Jentry Chau vs. the Underworld – Jackie Cole (Netflix)
  - Dream Productions – Josh Holtsclaw and Nami Melumad (Disney+)
  - Goosebumps: The Vanishing – Nik Braatz, Davis Cameron Chu, Mollie Davis, Nick Gardner, Ava Meller, Luke Shelley, Alances Vargas, Duarte Elvas, Cat McCarthy, Erin Sarofsky, Andy Grush, Taylor Stewart, Elliot Rudmann, Michael Bove, and Geoff Binns-Calvey (Disney+)
  - Star Wars: Skeleton Crew – Karin Fong, Tosh Kodama, Jorge Artola, Mick Giacchino, Faraz Abbasi, Jens Mebes, Izik Roitman, Alex Rupert, Henry Chang, Merrill Hall, Lexi Gunvaldson, and Doug Chiang (Disney+)
  - Your Friendly Neighborhood Spider-Man – Steven Walker, Leonardo Romero, J. Robert Harris, Jason Rabinowitz, Carmelo Cianflone, Isaac Lucas, Paul Francis Webster, Colton Fisher, Mel Zwyer, and Tim Pauer (Disney+)

=== Sound ===
Sound
Outstanding Sound Mixing and Sound Editing for a Live Action Program: Star Wars: Skeleton Crew: "You Have a Lot to Learn About Pirates" – Devendra Cleary, Tony Villaflor, Bonnie Wild, Trey Turner, Matthew Wood, Warren Brown, Luke Dennis, David Chrastka, Richard Gould, Shaun Farley, Joel Raabe, Frank Rinella, Sean England, Alyssa Nevarez, Margie O'Malley, Andrea Stelter Gard, Angela Ang, Brad Semenoff, and David W. Collins (Disney+); Goosebumps: The Vanishing: "The Girl Next Door" – Chris Rummel, Lucas Feuser, Evan Benjamin, John Werner, Mark Flip, Matt Snedecor, Chris White, Leslie Bloome, Shaun Brennan, Patrick Christensen, Ryan Collison, Connor Nagy, Dan Bricker, Sean Garnhart, and Steve Major Giammaria (Disney+); Makayla's Voice: A Letter to the World – Zach Hahn (Netflix); The Primrose Railway Children – John Cobban and Zander Mavor (BYUtv); A Real Bug's Life: "Once a Pond a Time" – James Bladon, Steve Griffen, and Aurélie Webb, George Fry, Jonathon Cawte, and Andy Devine (National Geographic); Sesame Street: "Jam Session Jam Up" – Frank DiMaulo, Anthony Cappellino, Michael Croiter, Tyler Hartman, Craig LoGiudice, Patrick Christensen, Brendan Roche, Paul Rudolph, Chris Sassano, Dick Maitland, and Steve Major Giammaria (HBO Max)	Outstanding Sound Mixing and Sound Editing for a Preschool Animated Program: Star Wars: Young Jedi Adventures: "The Battle of Tenoo" – Fil Brown, Melissa Ellis, Robbi Smith, J. Lampinen, David Bonilla, and Heather Olsen (Disney+); Batwheels: "Music Meister Mayhem" – Rob McIntyre, Evan Dockter, Mark A Keatts, David M Cowan, Kelly Foley Downs, Michael Garcia, and Darleen Stoker (HBO/HBO Max); Hot Wheels Let's Race: "Stop Those Cars! / Self-Destruct" – Michael Feldman, Gordon Suffield, Mark Kondracki, Robbi Smith, David Bonilla, J. Lampinen and Tanya Orlov (Netflix); Spidey and His Amazing Friends: "Moon Girl and the Dino Dilemma / Hulk's Squirrely Switch" – Eli Haligua, Kale MacCharles, Kevin Watson, and Reid Hendry (Disney+); Xavier Riddle and the Secret Museum: "I am Gwen Ifill / I am Matthew Henson" – Glenn Barna, Andrew McDonnell, Sue Robertson, Ryan Eligh, Joe Tetreau, and Mike Mancuso (PBS Kids)
Outstanding Sound Mixing and Sound Editing for an Animated Program: Ultraman: Rising – Gary A. Rizzo, Brian Chumney, Samson Neslund, Jamey Scott, Christopher Manning, John Cucci, Dan O'Connell, Rich Quinn, Randy Thom, and Leff Lefferts (Netflix); The Dragon Prince: "Dying Light" – Jay Cheetham, David Greene, Pat Haskill, Stefan Seslija, and Jeff Davis (Netflix); Jurassic World: Chaos Theory: "Fire in the Piazza" – Jacob Salerno, Anna Adams, Grace Stensland, Iris Dutour, Sanaa Kelley, Erika Koski, Adam Cioffi, Jeff Halbert, D.J. Lynch, and Rob McIntyre (Netflix); Lego Star Wars: Rebuild the Galaxy: "Part Two" – Margie O'Malley, Frank Rinella, and Jeff King (Disney+); Max & The Midknights: "Welcome to Byjovia" – Ryan Greene, Jordan Griffin, Manny Grijalva, Kody Orris, Jacob Cook, Jeff Shiffman, Brad Meyer, Matt Mahaffey, Keiffer Infantino, Joseph Garten, Logan Romjue, MPSE, Michael Wessner, Ryan Gegenheimer, and Carol Ma (Nickelodeon); Win or Lose: "Home" – Vince Caro, Andy Manganello, Tony Villaflor, Rachael Bigelow, Emma Present, Benjamin A. Burtt, Luke Dunn Gielmuda, Jordan Myers, Sean England, Andrea Stelter Gard, Jason Butler, Kim B. Christensen, and Jeremy Bowker (Disney+)

=== Visual and Special Effects ===
Effects
Outstanding Visual Effects for a Live Action Program
- Star Wars: Skeleton Crew – Shawn Kelly, Abbigail Keller, Pablo Molles, John Knoll, Nicole Matteson, Jeff Capogreco, Bobo Skipper, Andy Walker, Christopher Balog, Joseph Kasparian, and Eddie Pasquarello (Disney+)
  - Goosebumps: The Vanishing – Kunal Ghosh Dastider, Robin Hollander, Carlo Monaghan, Justin Reimer, Pedro Santos, Valda Koronczi, Sara Moore, Richard Thwaites, Michelle Kee, Mia Mallory Green, Bob Dewald, Michael Fournier, Tyler Ruocco, Aaron Barr, Michael Myers, Craig Young, Dave Hampton, Jan Dubberke, Bryce Leffew, Mitchell Ferm, Steve Sanchez, Jack Chaney, Lawren Bancroft-Wilson, and Sabine Laimer (Disney+)
  - Henry Danger: The Movie – Dan Dixon, Stanislaw Marek, Jon Mitchell, Pedro Santos, Kenson Wang, Nicole Whitmore Burke, Terry Hutcheson, Tatiana Bozzo, Ian Korver, John MacCuspie, and Matthew Lane (Nickelodeon)
  - Sweet Tooth – Matthew Bramante, Matt Holmes, Jacob Leaf, Rob Price, Pania Williams, Danica Tsang, Nicolette Hurnen, Aasta Otnes, Andrew J. Daniels, Anau Hazeldine, Patricia Binga, T.J. Grant, John Lipskie, Bryan Davies, Tristan Patrick, Jayson A. Castro, Christina Drahos, Graeme Baitz, Frank Riley, John Fukushima, Jonathan R. Nelson, Les Quinn, Dallis Anderson, Tara Khan, and Oliver Tresidder (Netflix)
  - Time Bandits – Jelmer Boskma, Patrick David, Abishek Nair, Tobias Wolters, Will Reece and Max Serges, Steve Ingram, James Dinsdale, and Patrick Junghans (Apple TV+)

=== Lifetime Achievement Award ===
- Bill Nye

== Shows with multiple nominations ==
Nominations	Series
17	Star Wars: Skeleton Crew
14	Sweet Tooth
11	Descendants: The Rise of Red
10	Goosebumps: The Vanishing
8	A Real Bug's Life
8	Dream Productions
8	Sesame Street
7	Time Bandits
7	Win or Lose
5	Heartstopper
5	Henry Danger: The Movie
5	Malory Towers
5	RoboGobo
5	Spellbound
5	The Primrose Railway Children
4	An Almost Christmas Story
4	Kiff
4	Star Wars: Young Jedi Adventures
4	The Tiny Chef Show
4	Wonder Pets: In the City
3	Batwheels
3	Donkey Hodie
3	Jane
3	Jentry Chau vs. the Underworld
3	Makayla's Voice: A Letter to the World
3	Moon Girl and Devil Dinosaur
3	Secrets at Red Rocks
3	Spidey and His Amazing Friends
3	Tab Time
3	That Christmas
3	Ultraman: Rising
2	Ariel
2	Beyond Black Beauty
2	Carl the Collector
2	Daniel Tiger's Neighborhood
2	Eva the Owlet
2	Girl Haunts Boy
2	Max & the Midknights
2	Me
2	Molly of Denali
2	Ms. Rachel
2	Odd Squad
2	Star Trek: Prodigy
2	The Dragon Prince
2	Wizards Beyond Waverly Place
2	Wolf King
2	Xavier Riddle and the Secret Museum
2	Your Friendly Neighborhood Spider-Man
