= Children's and Family Emmy Award for Outstanding Voice Performer =

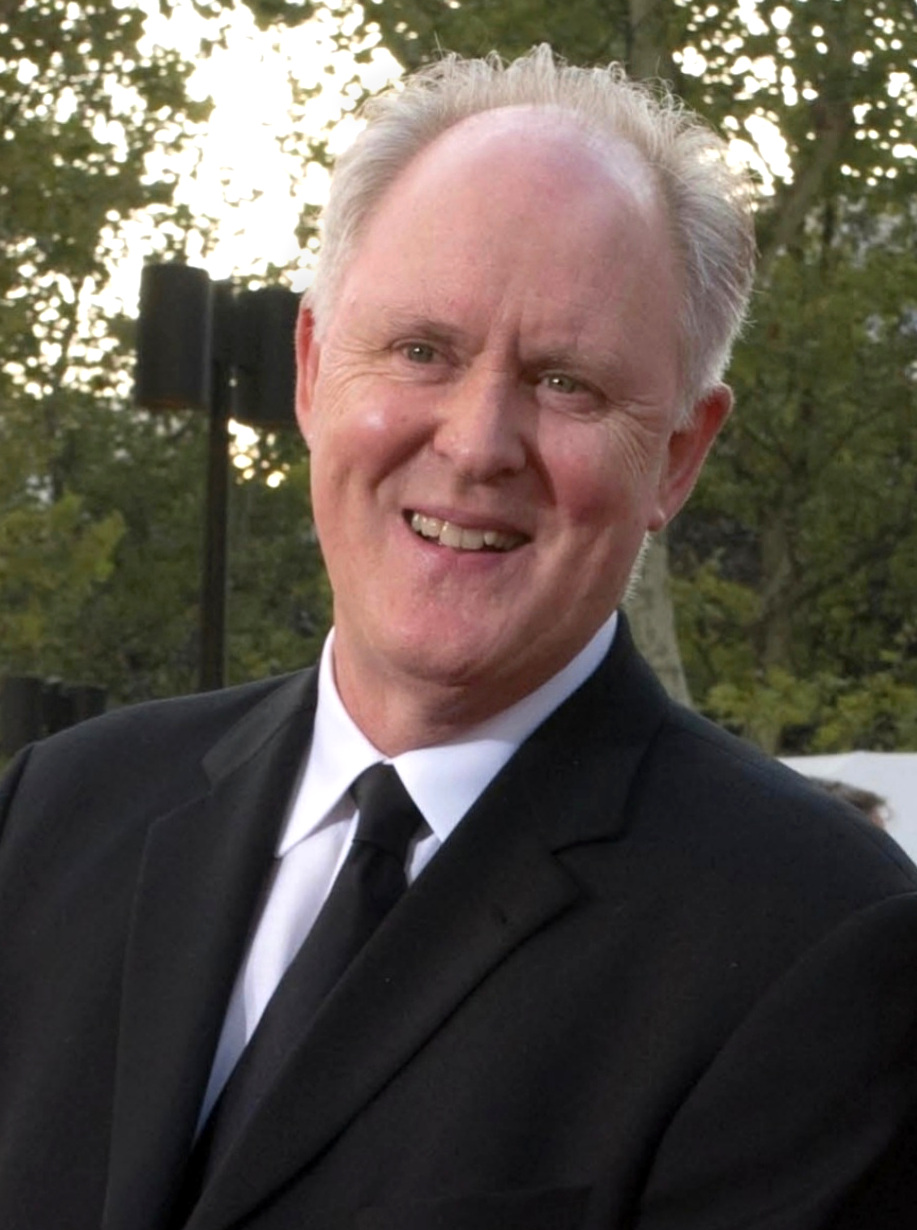
- The 2025 recipient: John Lithgow
- Awarded for: Outstanding Voice Performance in an Animated Program
- Country: United States
- Presented by: Academy of Television Arts & Sciences
- First award: 2022
- Currently held by: John Lithgow, Spellbound (2025)
- Website: theemmys.tv/childrens/

The Children's and Family Emmy Award for Outstanding Voice Performer honors performances in both television series and made-for-television/streaming films. The category was established at the 1st Children's and Family Emmy Awards in 2022, and is open to lead, supporting and guest performers of all genders. Its sister category Outstanding Voice Performance in a Preschool Animated Program honors voice-over performers in shows aimed at a younger audience. A similar category also exists to recognize younger voice performers. The category was split in 2026 to award performers who voice a single role and those who voice multiple roles in the same show. It was originally presented as Outstanding Voice Performer in an Animated Program, but this title was dropped as of the 4th Children's and Family Emmy Awards and it is now open to voice roles in both animated and live action programs.

The current holder of the award is Eric Bauza, who won at the 3rd Children's and Family Emmy Awards for his role as Daffy Duck & Bugs Bunny in the Cartoon Network series Teen Titans Go! episode "Warner Bros. 100th Anniversary".

== Background ==
On November 17, 2021, the NATAS announced the creation of the Children's and Family Emmy Awards to recognize the best in children's and family television. The organization cited an "explosive growth in the quantity and quality of children’s and family programming" as justification for a dedicated ceremony. Many categories of the awards were previously presented at the Daytime Emmy Awards. From 1995 to 2021, voice performers were honored with the Daytime Emmy Award for Outstanding Performer in an Animated Program; however, this category was discontinued following the announcement of the Children's and Family Emmys.

The original name for the category was Outstanding Voice Performance in an Animated Program, and the award received its current name as of the 3rd Children's and Family Emmy Awards.

Beginning with the 4th Children's and Family Emmy Awards, the category was split into two categories: Single Role Voice Performer and Multiple Role Voice Performer. Entrants into the Single Role Voice Performance category must be voicing only a singular character - they cannot choose only to enter a single voice from a show in which they voice multiple characters.

== Winners and nominations ==
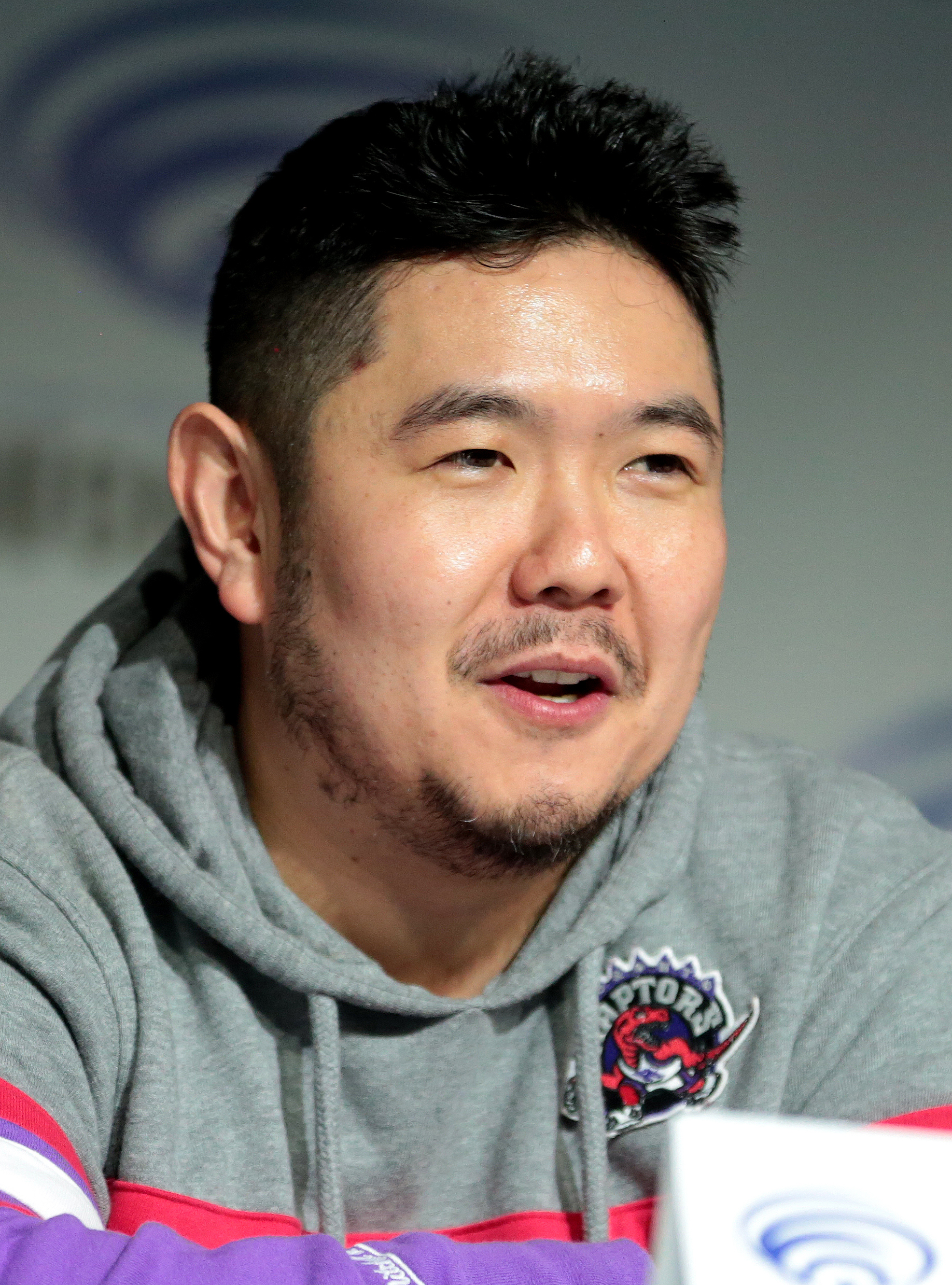
Inaugural (2022) & 2024 recipient Eric Bauza.

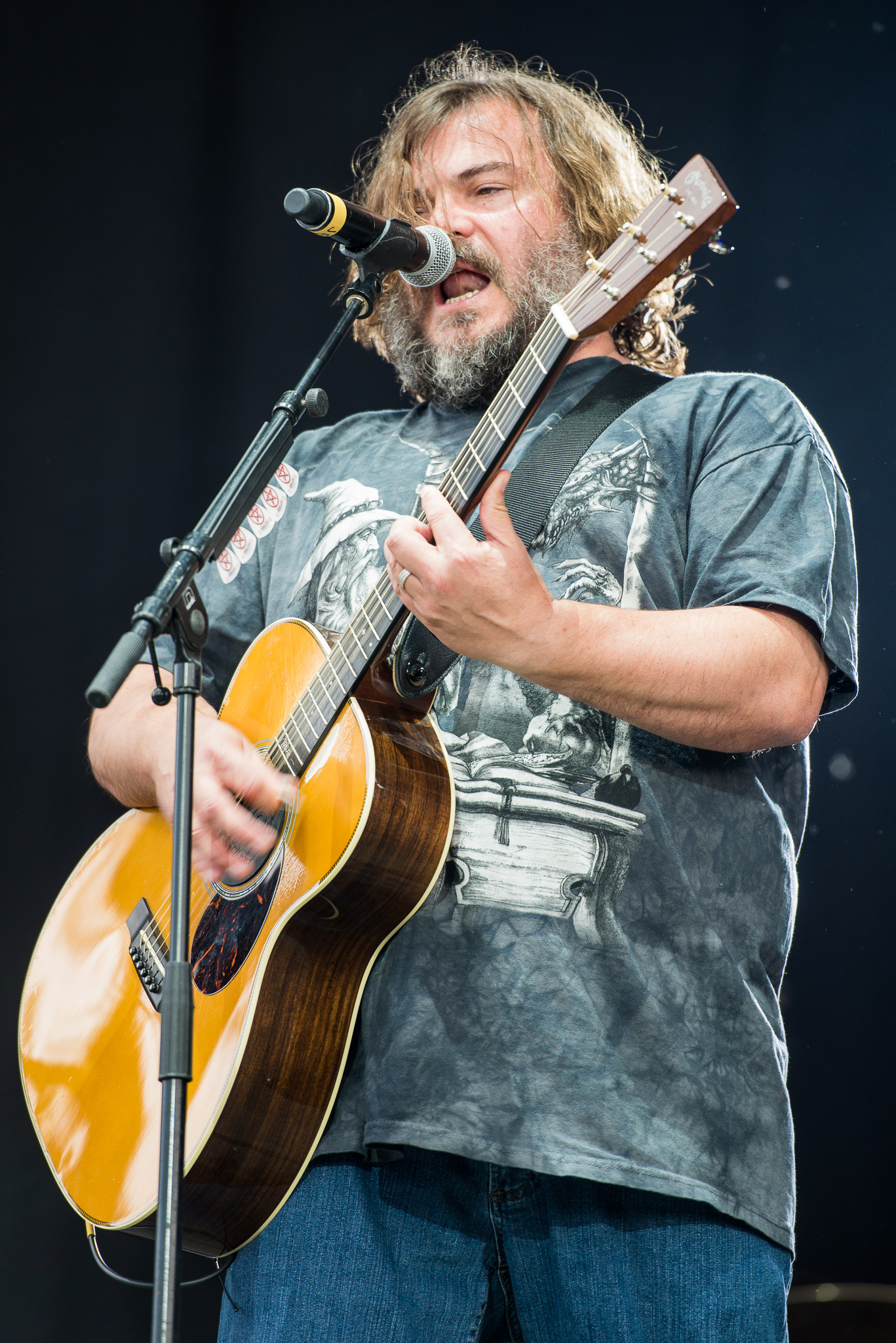
2023 recipient Jack Black.

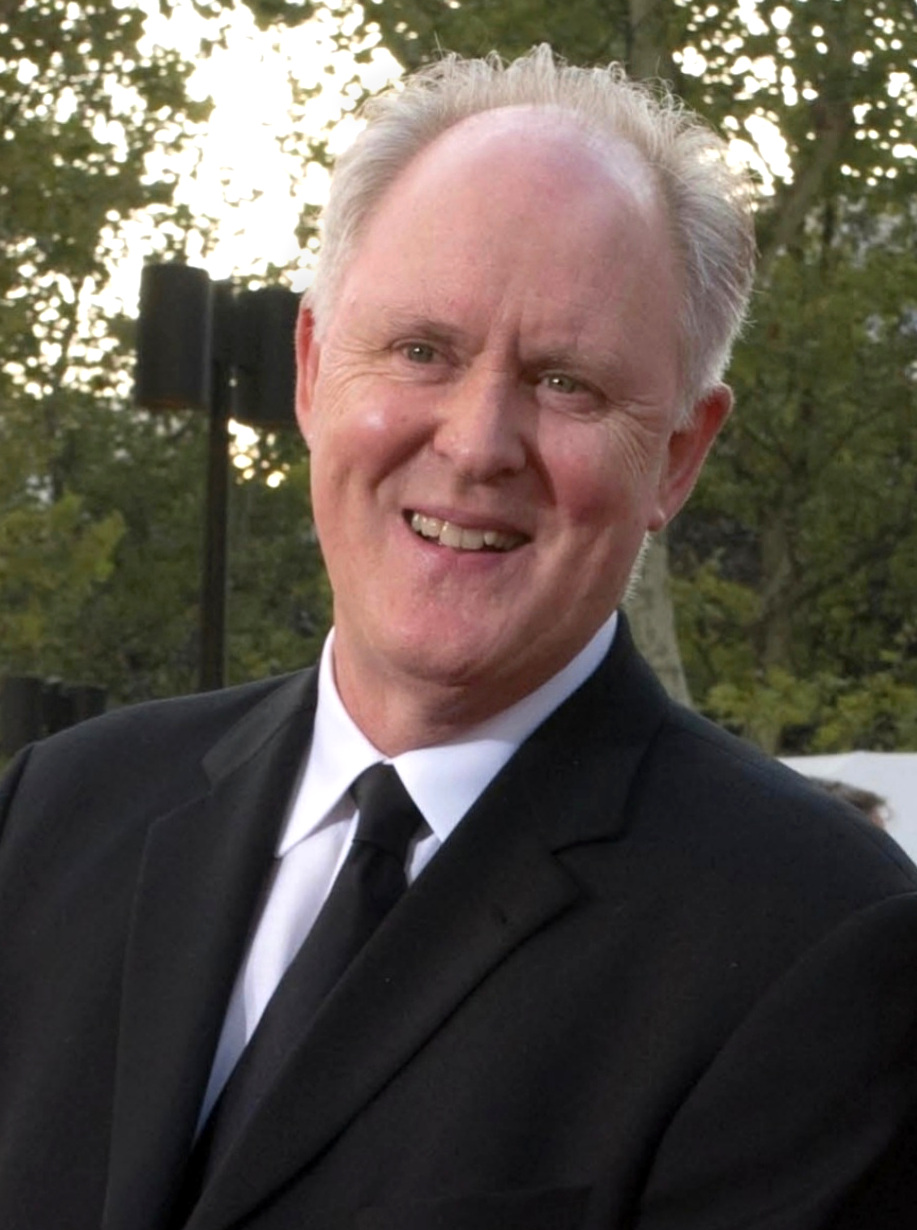
2025 recipient John Lithgow.

=== 2020s ===
Year	Actor	Role	Program	Network	Refs
2022 (1st)
2022 (1st)	Eric Bauza	Bugs Bunny, Marvin the Martian, Daffy Duck and Tweety	Looney Tunes Cartoons	HBO/HBO Max	
2022 (1st)	Grey DeLisle	Lola, Lana, Lily, Meryl, Cheryl, Scoots, Mopes & Mrs. Bernardo	The Loud House	Nickelodeon	
2022 (1st)	Mark Hamill	Skeletor	Masters of the Universe: Revelation	Netflix	
2022 (1st)	Tom Kenny	SpongeBob SquarePants	SpongeBob SquarePants	Nickelodeon	
2022 (1st)	Frank Welker	Himself, Fred and Scooby	Scooby-Doo and Guess Who?	Boomerang/HBO Max	
2023 (2nd)
2023 (2nd)	Jack Black	Po	Kung Fu Panda: The Dragon Knight: Seasons 1-2	Netflix	
2023 (2nd)	Bob Bergen	Porky Pig	Looney Tunes Cartoons	HBO Max	
2023 (2nd)	Laurence Fishburne	Beyonder	Moon Girl and Devil Dinosaur: Season 1	Disney Channel	
2023 (2nd)	Tom Kenny	SpongeBob SquarePants	SpongeBob SquarePants	Nickelodeon	
2023 (2nd)	Rob Paulsen	Pinky, Dr. Scratchansniff & Yakko	Animaniacs: Season 3	Hulu	
2024 (3rd)
2024 (3rd)	Eric Bauza	Daffy Duck & Bugs Bunny	Teen Titans Go!: Warner Bros. 100th Anniversary	Cartoon Network	
2024 (3rd)	Bob Bergen	Porky Pig	Looney Tunes Cartoons	HBO/Max	
2024 (3rd)	Ben Feldman	Tylor Tuskmon	Monsters at Work: Season 2	Disney+	
2024 (3rd)	William Shatner	Keldor	Masters of the Universe: Revolution	Netflix	
2024 (3rd)	Paul Walter Hauser	Dark	Orion and the Dark	Netflix	
2025 (4th)
2025 (4th)	Single Voice Role				
2025 (4th)	John Lithgow	Bolinar	Spellbound	Netflix	
2025 (4th)	Erik Dellums	Aaravos	The Dragon Prince	Netflix	
2025 (4th)	Cynthia Erivo	The Slink	RoboGobo	Disney+	
2025 (4th)	Ernie Hudson	Marlon	Angry Birds Mystery Island	Amazon Prime Video	
2025 (4th)	John C. Reilly	The Folk Singer	An Almost Christmas Story	Disney+	
2025 (4th)	Maya Rudolph	Jean	Dream Productions	Disney+	
2025 (4th)	Multiple Voice Roles				
2025 (4th)	David Errigo Jr.	Hampton J. Pig & Plucky Duck	Tiny Toons Looniversity	HBO/HBO Max	
2025 (4th)	Eric Bauza	Daffy Duck & The Do-Do	Daffy in Wackyland	HBO/HBO Max	
2025 (4th)	H. Michael Croner	Barry Buns, Rat, Chubbles Wubbington, Soda Jerk & Buffalo Security	Kiff	Disney+	
2025 (4th)	Kate Mulgrew	Admiral Janeway & Janeway Hologram	Star Trek: Prodigy	Netflix	
2025 (4th)	Kari Wahlgren	Evelyn & Mrs. Grant	Legends of Evergreen Hills	Chick-fil-A Play App	

== Performers with multiple wins ==
2 wins

- Eric Bauza

== Performers with multiple nominations ==
3 nominations

- Eric Bauza

2 nominations

- Bob Bergen
- Tom Kenny

== Programs with multiple nominations ==
3 nominations

- Looney Tunes Cartoons

2 nominations

- SpongeBob SquarePants

== Networks with multiple nominations ==
7 nominations

- Netflix

6 nominations

- Disney+/Disney Channel
- HBO/HBO Max

3 nominations

- Nickelodeon

2 nominations

- Cartoon Network
