= Children's and Family Emmy Award for Outstanding Voice Performer in a Preschool Animated Program =

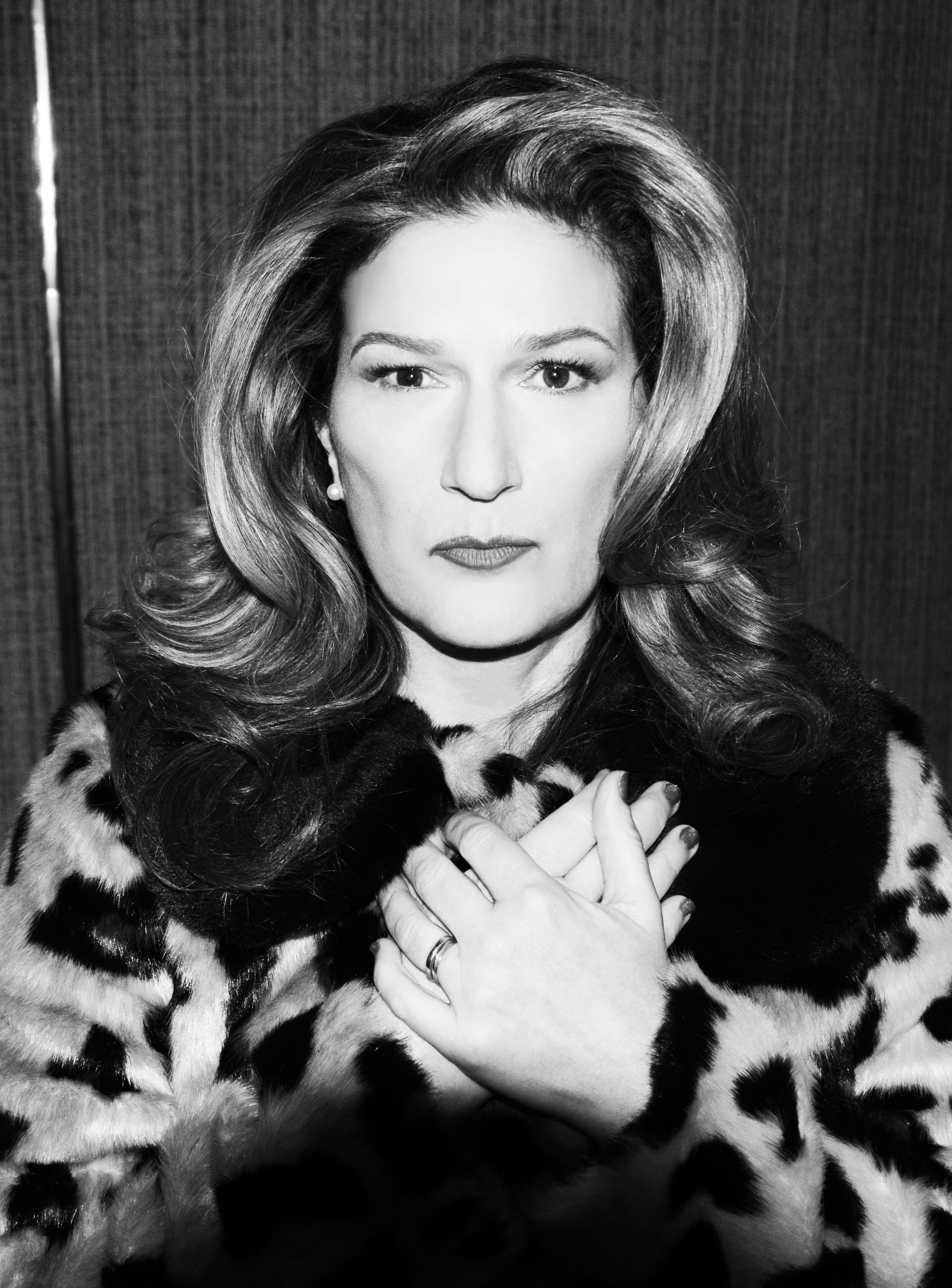
- The 2025 recipient: Ana Gasteyer
- Awarded for: Outstanding Voice Performance in a Preschool Animated Program
- Country: United States
- Presented by: Academy of Television Arts & Sciences
- First award: 2022
- Currently held by: Ana Gasteyer, RoboGobo (2025)
- Website: theemmys.tv/childrens/

The Children's and Family Emmy Award for Outstanding Voice Performer in a Preschool Animated Program honors performances in both television series and made-for-television/streaming films. The category was established at the 1st Children's and Family Emmy Awards in 2022, and is open to lead, supporting and guest performers of all genders. Its sister category Outstanding Voice Performance in an Animated Program honors voice-over performers in shows aimed at an older audience. A similar category also exists to recognize younger voice performers.

The current holder of the award is Ana Gasteyer, who won at the 4th Children's and Family Emmy Awards for her role as Crabitha in the Disney+ series RoboGobo.

== Background ==
On November 17, 2021, the NATAS announced the creation of the Children's and Family Emmy Awards to recognize the best in children's and family television. The organization cited an "explosive growth in the quantity and quality of children’s and family programming" as justification for a dedicated ceremony. Many categories of the awards were previously presented at the Daytime Emmy Awards. From 1995 to 2021, voice performers were honored with the Daytime Emmy Award for Outstanding Performer in an Animated Program; however, this category was discontinued following the announcement of the Children's and Family Emmys.

The original name for the category was Outstanding Voice Performance in a Preschool Animated Program, and the award received its current name as of the 3rd Children's and Family Emmy Awards.

== Winners and nominations ==
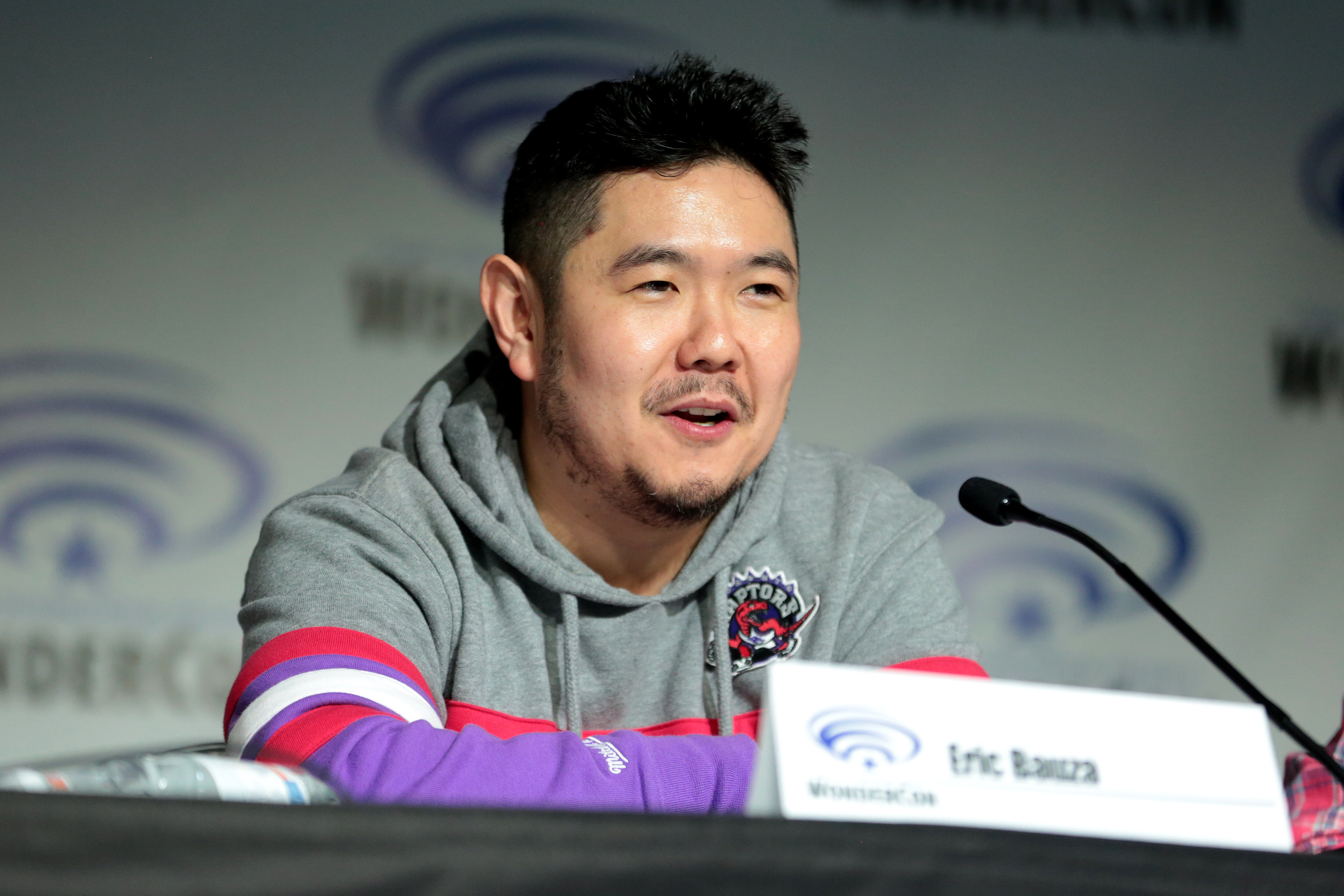
Inaugural recipient Eric Bauza.

=== 2020s ===
Year	Actor	Role/s	Program	Network	Refs
2022 (1st)
2022 (1st)	Daniel Ross	Donald Duck	Mickey and Minnie Wish Upon a Christmas	Disney Junior	
2022 (1st)	David Errigo Jr.	Dudley	Ridley Jones	Netflix	
2022 (1st)	Eden Espinosa	The Queen of Hearts	Alice's Wonderland Bakery	Disney Junior	
2022 (1st)	Michael Luwoye	Wavey Jones	Baby Shark's Big Show!	Nickelodeon	
2022 (1st)	Sherri Shepherd	Queen Fastine	Blaze and the Monster Machines	Nickelodeon	
2023 (2nd)
2023 (2nd)	Eric Bauza	Bugs Bunny, Daffy Duck, Tweety Bird & Marvin the Martian	Bugs Bunny Builders	Cartoon Network	
2023 (2nd)	Erin Fitzgerald	Bo, Eleanor Smartypants, Story StoryBerg, Ranger Dot, Oog the CaveBot & Fun Fact Hairdresser	StoryBots: Answer Time	Netflix	
2023 (2nd)	James Monroe Iglehart	Mr. Puppypaws/Announcer	SuperKitties	Disney Junior	
2023 (2nd)	Cree Summer	Lizard & DeeDee	Spirit Rangers	Netflix	
2023 (2nd)	Fred Tatasciore	Bang, BlimBlam the Barbarian & Chef Pierre	StoryBots: Answer Time	Netflix	
2024 (3rd)
2024 (3rd)	Kari Wahlgren	Granny Caterina, Ms. Poochytail & Magda	SuperKitties	Disney Jr.	
2024 (3rd)	Kimiko Glenn	Baby Shark	Baby Shark's Big Show!	Nickelodeon	
2024 (3rd)	Bobby Moynihan	Bobby Boots	Pupstruction	Disney Jr.	
2024 (3rd)	Cree Summer	Lizard & DeeDee	Spirit Rangers	Netflix	
2024 (3rd)	Fred Tatasciore	Bang, BlimBlam the Barbarian, King Hydrogen, Alabama Smith & The Lone Drifter	StoryBots: Answer Time	Netflix	
2025 (4th)
2025 (4th)	Ana Gasteyer	Crabitha	RoboGobo	Disney+	
2025 (4th)	Pamela Adlon	Aunt Lola	SuperKitties: Bossy Birdy	Disney+	
2025 (4th)	Dee Bradley Baker	Nubs & Zeephoz	Star Wars: Young Jedi Adventures	Disney+	
2025 (4th)	Jay Thomas Manuel	Jeff Mouse	Donkey Hodie	PBS Kids	
2025 (4th)	Amber Riley	Ursula	Ariel	Disney+	

== Performers with multiple nominations ==
2 nominations

- Cree Summer
- Fred Tatasciore

== Programs with multiple nominations ==
3 nominations

- StoryBots: Answer Time
- SuperKitties

2 nominations

- Baby Shark's Big Show!
- Spirit Rangers

== Networks with multiple nominations ==
9 nominations

- Disney Jr./Disney+

6 nominations

- Netflix

3 nominations

- Nickelodeon
