= Kari Wahlgren =

American voice actress (born 1977)

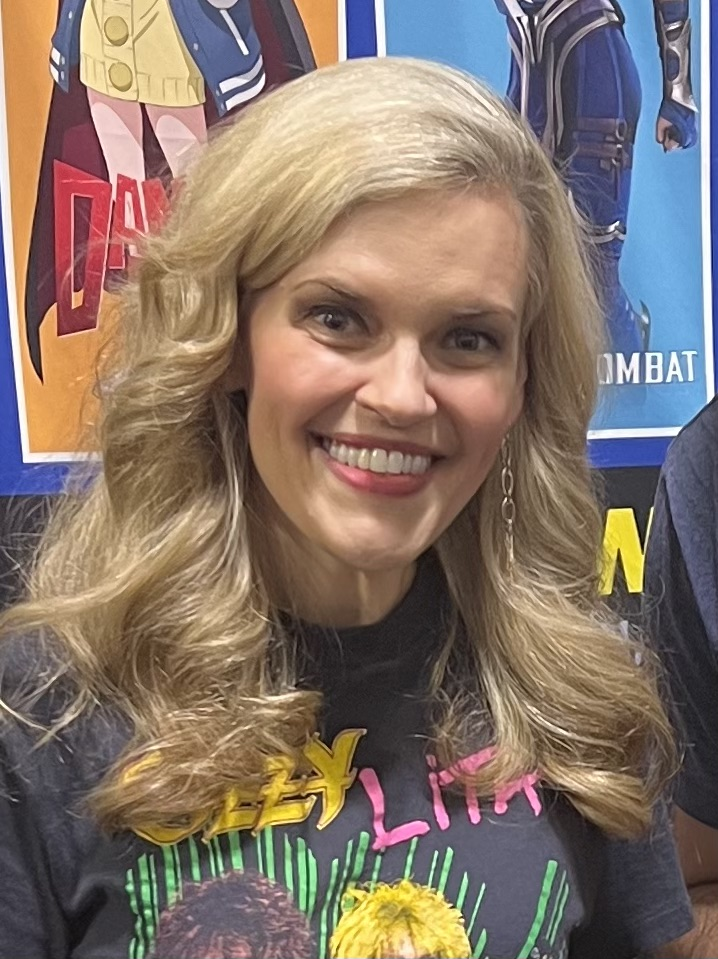
- Wahlgren at SacAnime in 2025
- Born: Kari Kay Wahlgren; July 13, 1977 (age 49); Hoisington, Kansas, U.S.
- Other names: Kay Jensen; Jennifer Jean
- Education: University of Kansas
- Occupation: Voice actress
- Years active: 2002–present
- Partner: Bobby Rock (2019–present)
- Children: 1
- Website: kariwahlgren.com

Kari Kay Wahlgren (born July 13, 1977) is an American voice actress who has provided English-language roles for animated movies, television series, and video games. She got her start in anime voice-overs as Haruko Haruhara in FLCL, and would later land major roles in a number of shows and films: Saya Otonashi in Blood+, Robin Sena in Witch Hunter Robin, Lavie Head in Last Exile, Fuu in Samurai Champloo, Rip van Winkle in Hellsing, Scarlett in Steamboy, Pacifica Casull in the Scrapped Princess, Michiru Satomi and Luca in Immortal Grand Prix, Kagami Hiiragi in Lucky Star, Saber in Fate/Zero, Fate/stay night: Unlimited Blade Works and Fate/stay night: Heaven's Feel, and Celty Sturluson in the Durarara!! series.

In American animation, she has provided voices for a number of series including Super Robot Monkey Team Hyperforce Go!, Gravity Falls, Fish Hooks, voicing Little Suzy in Phineas and Ferb, Dorothy and Queen Ozma in Dorothy and the Wizard of Oz, Ben 10, Kung Fu Panda: Legends of Awesomeness, Kaijudo: Rise of the Duel Masters, Bunnicula, The Fairly OddParents, Bunsen Is a Beast, and the Nickelodeon versions of Winx Club and Teenage Mutant Ninja Turtles, Jessica and Diane in Rick and Morty, and Baby Scrat in the Disney+ miniseries Ice Age: Scrat Tales and the film Ice Age: Boiling Point. Since 2023, she has voiced several roles in the children's series SuperKitties, for which she received a Children's and Family Emmy Award for Outstanding Voice Performer in a Preschool Animated Program.

In video games, she voiced lead characters Ashe in Final Fantasy XII, Shelke in Dirge of Cerberus: Final Fantasy VII, Kitana and Mileena in the Mortal Kombat series (beginning with Mortal Kombat 11), and Raine Sage in Tales of Symphonia.

== Early life ==
Wahlgren was born and raised in Hoisington, Kansas. She was inspired as a child by the Disney Princesses and other voices in animation. Her parents were teachers, which encouraged her to support charities and organizations that promote reading and education later in her career. On her 11th birthday, when she and her family were in California and toured the building for Focus on the Family, she was asked to do a bit role in their radio drama Adventures in Odyssey, as an 11-year-old character named Gloria McCoy. (Note: Wahlgren later returned to guest voice an episode of Adventures in Odyssey in 2010.) Wahlgren graduated from the University of Kansas with a Bachelor of Arts in Theater in 1999. (Note: Wahlgren supported a small theatre scholarship for University of Kansas undergrads.)

== Personal life ==
Wahlgren is of Swedish and Irish descent. In December 2022, she announced that she was expecting her first child with Nitro drummer Bobby Rock who was due in January 2023. She gave birth to their son that month.

== Career ==
Wahlgren lived in Kansas City, Missouri, where she did some radio spots, then moved to Los Angeles in 2000 to work on her acting career. In an interview in Lawrence Journal-World, she said that she was not getting much on-camera work, so she shifted her energies towards voice-over work, and that her experience with dialogue and Shakespeare classes helped a lot towards landing roles that involved various characters, some of which had accents or were from certain time periods.

=== Anime work ===
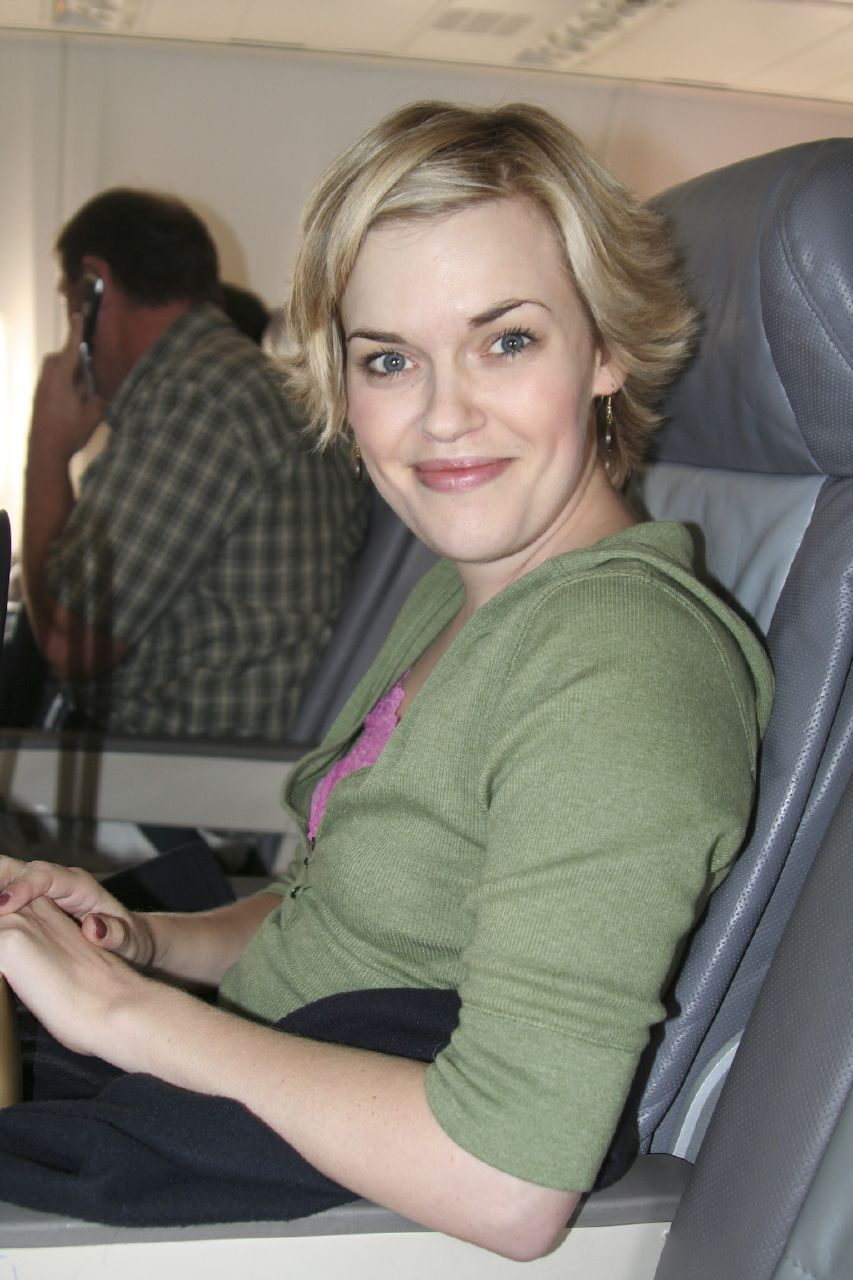
Wahlgren in 2007

Wahlgren's debut anime role was Haruko Haruhara in a six-episode OVA series called FLCL. In an interview with Anime Tourist, she said that Haruko was the only character she got to audition for. She depicted her as close to the original dub but with some American interpretation to appeal to the audience, and depending on how she was drawn, she changed her voice range from cartoon and childlike to realistic. In a later review of the series, Bryce Coulter of Mania.com was impressed by her character work: "she definitely gives Haruko that twenty-something, sarcastic and almost punkish persona." In 2018, she voiced in the new FLCL seasons, including as main character Haruha Raharu in FLCL: Progressive and reprising Haruko in FLCL: Alternative.

Wahlgren's next major anime dub role was in Witch Hunter Robin, where she played the title character Robin Sena, a soft-spoken girl who joins a group of witch hunters, but harbors some magic abilities of her own. Zac Bertschy of Anime News Network said she was "pleasant, subtle and perfect for the role" and wished the supporting voice cast would demonstrate such subtleties. She voiced lead character Lavie Head in the steampunk fantasy series Last Exile. Allen Divers of Anime News Network grouped her with the "better known names of the California voice-acting scene". She voiced title character Sakura Kinomoto in Bang Zoom!'s dubbing of Cardcaptor Sakura Movie 2: The Sealed Card, which Divers praised that "the voice actors did a great job of matching the emotions of the original Japanese voices, including Sakura's trademark expression 'Hoe!'", something that was missing in previous English adaptations. In live-action works, she starred as Tinkerbell in an indie Peter Pan film rendition called Neverland, released in 2003. Her character was described as a "sullen sidekick" and "drugged-out".

In 2004, she voiced a starring role in the animated feature film Steamboy, among actors Anna Paquin, Patrick Stewart and Alfred Molina. She played Scarlett, a teenage granddaughter of the corporation's chairman, described as spoiled and cruel, and generally annoying. Peter Sanderson of IGN called Scarlett one of the most obnoxious characters he has ever encountered, and hardly stands up to her movie equivalent. She voiced Chika Minazuki in Ai Yori Aoshi, a little cousin character. Way Jeng of Mania.com described her performance as energetic, yet innocent and simple, but contrasting to Wendee Lee's voicing of Tina Foster. In 2005, she voiced the female lead character Fuu Kasumi in Samurai Champloo. Carlo Santos of Anime News Network thought the characters sounded "well-suited to their personalities", but was concerned that Fuu "falls into the habit of sounding like every other ditzy anime girl out there." In Scrapped Princess, she voices the title character Pacifica Casull, who is hunted down because of a prophecy where she would cause the destruction of the world if she lives to see her 16th birthday. Theron Martin called her acting of "Pacifica's brattiness and deep sensitivity solidly pegged", although it is different from her Japanese counterpart as it "lacks some of the poutiness", and takes some time to get used to.

=== Video game work ===
Wahlgren has been involved in a number of video games. Her first voice-over role in video games was in Buffy the Vampire Slayer: Chaos Bleeds where she played Willow Rosenberg. In the James Bond video game From Russia with Love, released in 2005, she voiced a Bond girl that was paired with Sean Connery's original voice. In 2006, she landed leading roles of Ashelia B'nargin Dalmasca in Final Fantasy XII and Shelke in Dirge of Cerberus – Final Fantasy VII. In an interview conducted by UFFSite and RPGSite, she recounts how she received notice of the roles on two consecutive days, and said that the franchise was like "the holy grail of video game acting". She portrayed Ashe with a bit of a regal tone, after the director encouraged her to do so following a class where she was doing Shakespeare. She describes her character as someone a girl would look up to as "intelligent, diplomatic, and can kick ass and look good doing it". In contrast, Shelkie was desired to be portrayed as very cold and emotionless, which she describes as "cold, but sympathetic." In 2007, she voiced the playable title character in the strategy-RPG Jeanne d'Arc. Wahlgren voices the female Jedi Knight in the MMO Star Wars: The Old Republic. She also voices several characters in the MMO Guild Wars 2, most notably Caithe. Wahlgren also voiced Mevia from the choice-based video game Minecraft: Story Mode by Telltale Games. In 2020, she voiced Evelyn Parker in the action role-playing game Cyberpunk 2077.

=== Other animation ===
Wahlgren's involvement in animation voice-over took off in 2004 when she was cast in a lead role in the Disney/Jetix ensemble action superhero show Super Robot Monkey Team Hyperforce Go! where she voiced Nova. The show ran for four seasons from 2004 to 2006. She would also pick up recurring villain roles such as Samantha Paine aka Magness in A.T.O.M. and Charmcaster in Ben 10, the latter of which would return in the show's sequels and related video games. In 2007, she voiced Tak's friend Jeera in Nickelodeon's computer graphics-animated series Tak and the Power of Juju. She voiced little sister character Suzy Johnson in Disney's hit series Phineas and Ferb, and participated in the second season of the animated comedy Lil' Bush where she voiced Lil' Hillary and Lil' Condi.

Wahlgren became a regular cast member for Fish Hooks, which premiered in 2010, where she voiced Shellsea and many supporting and guest characters. She landed the role of Tigress in the television adaptation Kung Fu Panda: Legends of Awesomeness (replacing Angelina Jolie); the series premiered in 2011 and has run over four seasons. Also in 2011, Wahlgren started voicing Faragonda in the Nickelodeon revival of Winx Club. In 2012, she had the lead role of Allie Underhill in the action series Kaijudo, which spanned 52 episodes, and picked up roles in other cartoon shows such as Gravity Falls and Randy Cunningham: 9th Grade Ninja. She voiced Meg, the starring love interest in the Disney short film Paperman which screened before Wreck-It Ralph in the theaters in 2012. In an interview with her school's alumni association, she said that she was asked to do the role because of her previous involvements in Bolt and Tangled. Recording for the film took about 30 minutes, mostly of vocal sounds. The short went on to win an Academy Award for Best Animated Short Film.

In 2015, she joined the cast of Fairly OddParents as a starring character Chloe Carmichael in its show's tenth season. She continued to voice Jessica and other characters for Rick and Morty during its third season, and voiced Amanda in the Butch Hartman-produced series Bunsen Is a Beast which aired on Nickelodeon in February 2017. In July 2017, she voiced Dorothy Gale in the animated television series Dorothy and the Wizard of Oz broadcast on Boomerang. In 2023, Wahlgren voiced multiple characters in My Dad the Bounty Hunter, specifically Lootbat and Mike.

== Recognition ==
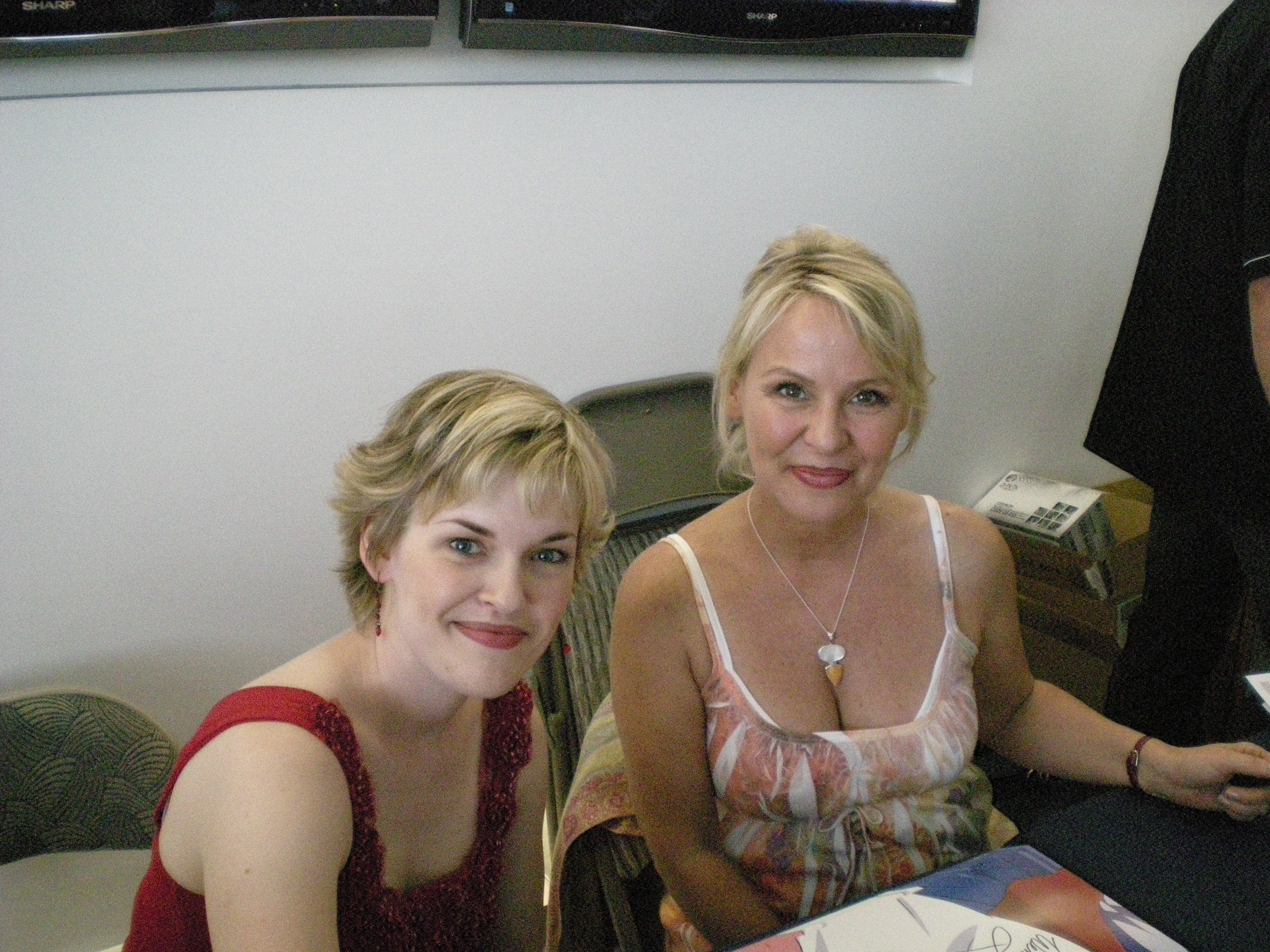
Wahlgren with Wendee Lee at the Lucky Star English dub premiere in Los Angeles, 2008

Some of her work has garnered recognition, awards and nominations from websites that review anime and animation. Mania.com wrote that Wahlgren's performance as the straight-man character Kagami Hiiragi in Lucky Star was absolute sarcastic perfection, and named her the Best Overlooked Actress for 2008 in their annual Anime Dubbies Awards. Theron Martin liked Celty Sturluson, a headless dullahan character in Durarara!! who uses mostly body language and typed words. In his year-end awards for 2011, he selected Wahlgren the Best English Dub Performance – Female.

On the Behind the Voice Actors website, she was selected by the staff as the Voice Actress of the Year in 2012, and was nominated for 2011 and 2013. She received nominations in other categories: Best Female Lead Vocal Performer in an Anime Title for Celty in Durarara!! in 2011, Best Female Lead Vocal Performance in a Television Series – Action / Drama for Allie Underhill in Kaijudo in 2012, Best Female Lead Vocal Performance in a Television Series – Comedy / Musical for Tigress in Kung Fu Panda: Legends of Awesomeness in 2012, Best Female Lead Vocal Performance in an Anime Television Series/OVA for Saber in Fate/zero, Best Female Supporting Vocal Performance in an Anime Movie/Special for Karina Lyle/Blue Rose in Tiger & Bunny: The Beginning in 2013, Best Female Vocal Performance in a Television Series in a Guest Role – Action/Drama for Letta Turmond in Star Wars: The Clone Wars and Best Female Vocal Performance in a Video Game in a Supporting Role for Courtney Collins in Metal Gear Rising: Revengeance.

=== Awards and nominations ===
Year	Organisation	Category	Project	Result	Ref.
2024	Children's and Family Emmy Awards	Outstanding Voice Performer in a Preschool Animated Program	SuperKitties	Won	
2025	Children's and Family Emmy Awards	Outstanding Multiple Voice Role Performer	Legends of Evergreen Hills	Nominated	

== Discography ==
- Adventures in Odyssey radio drama – Gloria McCoy (episode "Camp What-A-Nut", 1988, first-ever voice role) and Maria (episode 676: "An Agreeable Nanny", 2010)
