= Eric Bauza =

Canadian voice actor (1979–2026)

- Bauza in 2018
- Born: December 7, 1979; Scarborough, Ontario, Canada
- Died: October 25, 2026 (aged 46); Los Angeles, California, U.S.
- Education: Centennial College
- Occupations: Voice actor; animator
- Years active: 2000–2026
- Known for: Providing the modern voices for Bugs Bunny, Daffy Duck, Marvin the Martian, Puss in Boots, Baby Fozzie, and Woody Woodpecker
- Children: 1

Eric Bauza (December 7, 1979 – October 25, 2026) was a Canadian voice actor and animator. He voiced various Looney Tunes characters, and won three Emmy Awards for his performances in Looney Tunes Cartoons (2020–2024), Bugs Bunny Builders (2022–2025), and Teen Titans Go! (2024). His other major roles in television and film include Belly Bag in Uncle Grandpa (2013–2017), Buhdeuce in Breadwinners (2014–2016), Puss in Boots in The Adventures of Puss in Boots (2015–2018), Baby Fozzie in Muppet Babies (2018–2022), Splinter in Rise of the Teenage Mutant Ninja Turtles (2018–2020), Luke Skywalker in Lego Star Wars, Big Bob and Jimmy Pesto in Bob's Burgers (2022-2026) and Woody Woodpecker in Woody Woodpecker (2017) and Woody Woodpecker Goes to Camp (2024).

== Early life ==
Eric Bauza was born on December 7, 1979, in the Toronto suburban district of Scarborough, to Elvira Bauza, a property assessment clerk, and Eddie Bauza, a correctional officer. He had an older brother, Alan, and was of Filipino descent. His father and grandfather were fans of classic cartoons such as Looney Tunes. He stated that watching Mr. Dressup while growing up inspired his creative side; Bauza would draw with the host of the show while he was watching it. Growing up, Bauza cited Mike Myers, a fellow Scarborough native, an influence to him.

He attended Cardinal Newman Catholic High School (now St. John Henry Newman) in Scarborough from 1993 to 1996. He presented the school's morning announcements with the voices of Homer Simpson and Beavis and Butt-Head. He also created video sketches for their assemblies in character as Ace Ventura and Austin Powers. Bauza was chosen as the valedictorian in his senior year for his ability to "command a crowd and deliver laughs." He graduated from Centennial College in 2000, being in the Radio, Television, and Film Program.

== Career ==
Bauza moved to Los Angeles to stay with his uncle where he started his career in animation as an intern at Spümcø during his third year of college and later became a production assistant on Weekend Pussy Hunt and The Ripping Friends which was his first voice acting role. His breakthrough role was on Ren & Stimpy "Adult Party Cartoon", where he took over the role of Stimpy from Billy West. Bauza also acquired a visa to stay in the U.S. after being cast in El Tigre: The Adventures of Manny Rivera (2007–2008).

Bauza and Rachel Adams at the 41st Annie Awards in 2014

Bauza voiced Lord Stingray on the Adult Swim series Superjail! and Marvin the Martian on The Looney Tunes Show. Between 2012 and 2014, he voiced Driba, Diamondhead, Dr. Psychobos and other characters on Ben 10: Omniverse. He also appeared in episodes of the animated web series Dick Figures, where he voiced the Genie of the Teapot, the Vulgar Mall Santa, and the Ninjas. He was also the voice of Lord Takagami, the main antagonist of Dick Figures: The Movie (2013). He played Buhdeuce in Breadwinners and the title character in Netflix's The Adventures of Puss in Boots and related media.

He performed stand-up comedy at the Laugh Factory in Los Angeles.

Bauza voiced characters including Bugs Bunny, Daffy Duck, Porky Pig, Tweety, Marvin the Martian, and Woody Woodpecker. For his role in Looney Tunes Cartoons, Bauza won the inaugural Children's and Family Emmy Award for Outstanding Voice Performance in an Animated Program. He also voiced Rash in the 2020 version of Battletoads. Bauza was briefly a late-night talk show host on The Late Night Show Tonight.

On March 23, 2021, Bauza appeared on the ABC game show To Tell the Truth and performed in his Looney Tunes voices.

Bauza speaking at the 2025 San Diego Comic-Con International

In 2022, he hosted Stay Tooned, a six-part documentary series on the cultural impact of cartoons, for CBC Gem.

In 2023, Bauza became the new voice of Buster Bunny in the reboot series Tiny Toons Looniversity.

In 2025, he appeared live and performed as Bugs Bunny and other Looney Tunes characters for Bugs Bunny on Broadway. at the Hollywood Bowl celebrating Bugs' 85th anniversary. He also voiced Bugs, Daffy Duck, and Tweety in the world premiere of an animated short during the event.

Bauza voiced two characters in Bob's Burgers who were originally voiced by other actors. In the show's twelfth season, he took over the role of Bob Belcher's father, Robert "Big Bob" Belcher Sr., who was originally voiced by H. Jon Benjamin in a voice-only flashback and later by Bill Hader in the fifth season episode "Father of the Bob". Following Jay Johnston's firing, Bauza also took over the role of Jimmy Pesto Sr. in the show's fourteenth season. Prior to his death, Bauza had two projects in pre-production: Bye Bye Bunny: A Looney Tunes Musical and The Dragon Masters.

== Personal life and death ==
Bauza was previously in a relationship with animation director Jessica Lynn Borutski. The two have a son, born in 2016. At the time of his death, Bauza was engaged to Caroline Buermann, a branding and licensing consultant. They collaborated in 2025 to launch Saturday Morning Cartoons United, a non-profit and charity that organizes animation screenings.

Bauza died suddenly from hypertensive heart disease at his home in Los Angeles, on October 25, 2026, at the age of 46. Sleep apnea and obesity were also listed as significant conditions.

== Awards and nominations ==
Awards and nominations received by Eric Bauza
Award	Year	Category	Nominated work	Result	Ref.
Annie Awards	2014	Voice Acting in an Animated TV/Broadcast Production	The Fairly OddParents	Nominated	
Annie Awards	2016	Voice Acting in an Animated TV/Broadcast Production	Breadwinners	Nominated	
Annie Awards	2016	Voice Acting in an Animated TV/Broadcast Production	The Adventures of Puss in Boots	Nominated	
Children's and Family Emmy Awards	2022	Outstanding Voice Performance in an Animated Program	Looney Tunes Cartoons	Won	
Children's and Family Emmy Awards	2023	Outstanding Voice Performance in a Preschool Animated Program	Bugs Bunny Builders	Won	
Children's and Family Emmy Awards	2025	Outstanding Voice Performer in a Children's or Young Teen Program	Teen Titans Go!	Won	
Children's and Family Emmy Awards	2026	Outstanding Multiple Role Voice Performer in a Children's or Young Teen Program	Daffy in Wackyland	Nominated	
Daytime Emmy Awards	2016	Outstanding Performer in an Animated Program	The Adventures of Puss in Boots	Nominated	
Daytime Emmy Awards	2019	Outstanding Performer in a Preschool Animated Program	Muppet Babies	Nominated	
Daytime Emmy Awards	2020	Outstanding Performer in a Preschool Animated Program	Muppet Babies	Nominated	
Daytime Emmy Awards	2021	Outstanding Performer in a Preschool Animated Program	Muppet Babies	Nominated	
Daytime Emmy Awards	2021	Outstanding Performer in an Animated Program	Looney Tunes Cartoons	Nominated	
