= Chick-fil-A Play =

Entertainment app by Chick-fil-A

- Release: November 18, 2024; 22 months ago
- Operating system: iOS, Android
- Website: www.chick-fil-a.com/play

Chick-fil-A Play is a family-friendly entertainment app by Chick-fil-A. It was released on the App Store on November 4, 2024, and Google Play on November 14, 2024, and was officially launched on November 18.

== Features ==
The app contains original shows, podcasts, games, recipes, and e-books, including an original animated show titled Legends of Evergreen Hills and a scripted podcast titled Hidden Island.

== History ==
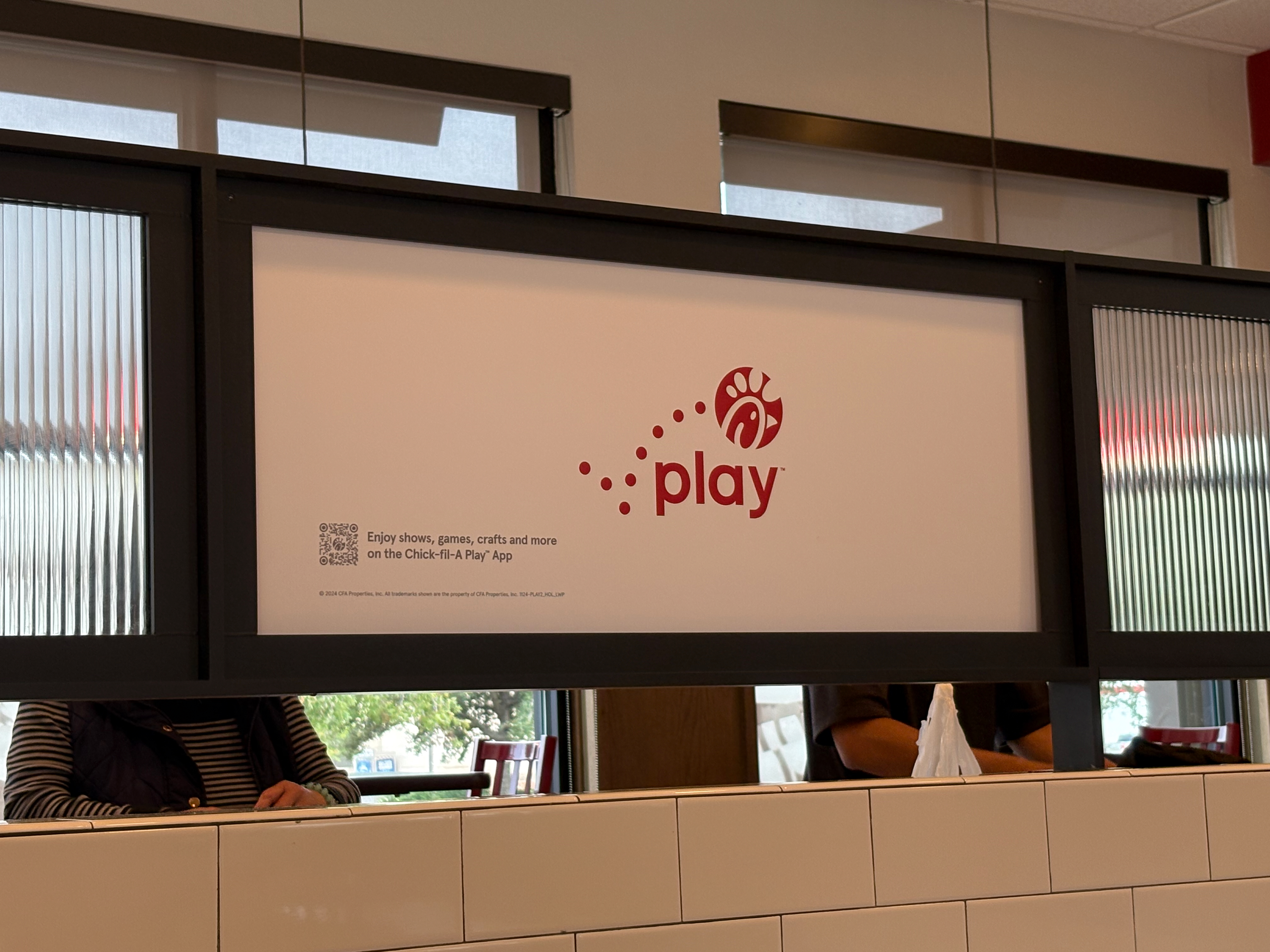
Branding for the app at a restaurant on launch day (November 18, 2024)

In August 2024, Chick-fil-A announced they would be releasing a streaming service.

By October 2024, more details had surfaced that the app was going to be more than just videos, and would be a larger entertainment app, alongside family-friendly media. On October 18, 2024, Chick-fil-A released a trailer for one of their shows named Legends of Evergreen Hills, with new episodes released each week through the holiday season. In a press release on October 21, Chick-fil-A elaborated on the app's features, stating the app would be for parents and kids, and would be free.

The platform was officially launched on November 18, 2024.

== Shows ==
=== Animated ===
- The Stories of Evergreen Hills (2022–23)
- Cow Tales (2023–25)
- The Legends of Evergreen Hills (2024–25)
- Cow Squad (2026)

==== Live Action ====
- Recipe Remix (2024)
- Play It Forward (2025)
- Kind & Seek (2026)
