= RoboGobo =

Animated superhero children's television series

- Promotional poster
- Created by: Chris Gilligan
- Developed by: Matt Hoverman
- Voices of: Ja'Siah Young; Azuri Hardy Jones; Brayden Morgan; Gracen Newton; Leili Ahmadyar; Dee Bradley Baker
- Theme music composer: Rob Cantor
- Opening theme: "RoboGobo Theme"
- Ending theme: "RoboGobo Theme" (instrumental)
- Composers: Keith Horn (Score); Rob Cantor (Songs)
- Countries of origin: United States; Ireland
- Original language: English
- No. of seasons: 2
- No. of episodes: 48

Production
- Executive producers: Chris Gilligan; Cathal Gaffney; Darragh O'Connell
- Producers: Alexander Lentjes; Nayanshi Shaw
- Editors: Matt Hoverman; Andy Guerdat; Brandon Violette
- Running time: 24 minutes
- Production company: Brown Bag Films

Original release
- Network: Disney Jr.
- Release: January 17, 2025 – present

RoboGobo (stylised all caps) is an animated superhero children's television series created by Chris Gilligan and produced by Brown Bag Films. The series follows five adopted pets who are equipped with super-powered Robo-Suits by the young inventor Dax, embarking on missions to rescue other animals in need. RoboGobo premiered on Disney Jr. on January 17, 2025. In June 2025, the series was renewed for a second season, which premiered on February 16, 2026.

== Premise ==
On the futuristic island of MetroPet Island which is divided between the City Side and the Wild Side, humans and talking animals live side-by-side, A team of superhero rescue pets—Allie, Booster, Hopper, Shelly, and Wingo—undertakes missions to assist other animals in need. The series follows the team as they learn to function as a family while confronting challenges, including villains like Gimme Pig, Mönkey Wrënch, Pupsicle, and The Slink. This show combines action-oriented adventures, comical animal antagonists, and inventive robotic gadgets with themes appropriate for a preschool audience, such as teamwork, problem-solving, and kindness. When transforming into their superhero forms, the pets do so to the accompaniment of the "RoboGobo Go" theme song.

Season two has the Robo-Suits of Team RoboGobo upgraded to have vehicle forms as they gain Captain Shrimperton as their latest villain.

== Characters ==
=== Main ===
- Dax Maxwell (voiced by Ja'Siah Young) is a kid inventor with a cybernetic prosthetic left arm (he was born without one of his hands and has a limb difference, it also has been upgraded as of Season 2) who adopts the rescue pets that make up Team RoboGobo. His cybernetic prosthetic is equipped with different devices, which include the condensed version of Team RoboGobo's Robo-Suits and a forcefield projector.
- Allie (voiced by Azuri Hardy Jones) is an Abyssinian cat whose Robo-Suit grants her enhanced agility and sharp claws.
- Booster (voiced by Brayden Morgan) is a blue Husky whose Robo-Suit grants him super-speed, enhanced senses, and retractable roller-skate wheels.
- Hopper (voiced by Gracen Newton) is a purple rabbit whose Robo-Suit grants him enhanced hopping and digging abilities.
- Shelly (voiced by Leili Ahmadyar) is a turtle whose Robo-Suit grants her super-strength and has a removable shell that doubles as a shield.
- Wingo (vocal effects provided by Dee Bradley Baker) is a red bird of indeterminate species with one small wing whose Robo-Suit enables him to fly faster and dispense attachable parachutes. Wingo is also shown to be strong enough to lift anyone.

=== Recurring ===
- Professor Millie Maxwell (voiced by Susan Kelechi Watson) is an inventor and Dax's mother.
- Dr. Vaughn Maxwell (voiced by Dulé Hill) is a veterinarian and Dax's father.
- Chef Polly (voiced by Valerie Bertinelli) is a pizza chef who runs Polly's Pet-Zeria.
  - Gill (vocal effects provided by Dee Bradley Baker) is the pet goldfish of Chef Polly.
- Dame Luxley (voiced by Alan Cumming) is a rich lady on Metropet Island.
  - Crabitha (voiced by Ana Gasteyer) is the pet hermit crab of Dame Luxley with a crabby personality.
- Sam (voiced by Christopher Murney) is a shepherd on Metropet Island.
  - Sherry (voiced by Risa Mei in season 1, Triya Leong in season 2) is one of Sam's sheep.
  - Mary (voiced by Cristina Pucelli) is one of Sam's sheep.
  - Carrie (voiced by Corinne Boettger) is one of Sam's sheep.
  - Gary (voiced by Dee Bradley Baker) is one of Sam's sheep.
  - Larry (voiced by Jim Conroy) is one of Sam's sheep.
- Nicholas (voiced by Shyam Balasubramanian) is a boy on Metropet Island.
  - Gatsby (voiced by Jim Conroy) is Nicholas' pet dog.
- Clipboard Keith (voiced by Adam Croasdell) is a man who is often seen holding a clipboard. He works as an event organizer and proprietor of the roller rink.
  - Kev (voiced by Trina Leong in "The Birthday Bandit", Zach Tinkler in later episodes) is Clipboard Keith's pet dog.
- Marisol (voiced by Carolina Ravassa) is a woman on Metropet Island.
  - Hector (vocal effects provided by Dee Bradley Baker in the first appearance, voiced by Carlos Alazraqui in the second appearance) is Marisol's pet hamster.
- Barry Tone (voiced by Jim Conroy) is a man who works as a one-man band.
  - Bravo (vocal effects provided by Dee Bradley Baker) is Barry Tone's pet bullfrog.
- Bob Beaks (voiced by Zach Tinker) is a birdwatcher on Metropet Island who owns a flock of birds.
- Park Ranger Pep (voiced by Lana McKissack) is a park ranger who operates in Metropet Island's Wild Side.
- Matilda (vocal effects provided by Audrey Wasilewski) is an adult cougar who lives in the Wild Side with her cub.
- PJ (voiced by Joshua David Robinson) is the proprietor of the Heads 'n Tails Salon.
  - Polonious (vocal effects provided by Dee Bradley Baker) is PJ's pet peafowl.
  - The Barber-Bots are barber-themed robots who help out at the Heads 'n Tails Salon.
- Risky and Royale (voiced by Georgie Kidder and Natalie Lander, respectively) are two raccoons who are superfans of Team RoboGobo.
- Reporter Rubi (voiced by Nazia Chaudhry) is a reporter on Metropet Island who covers the reports on the different activities like Professor Maxwell's creations and villain attacks.
  - Marcy (voiced by Audrey Wasilewski) is the pet scarlet macaw of Reporter Rubi.
- Farmer Faye (voiced by Alison Pill) is a farmer on Metropet Island.
- Paolo (voiced by Christopher Sean Cooper Jr.) is a platypus living in the Wild Side who befriends Park Ranger Pep.
- Molly and Milo (voiced by Sutton Foster and Nate Torrence) are two waste collectors who adopt Risky and Royale in "Risky & Royale's Christmas Wish".

=== Villains ===
- Gimme Pig (voiced by Mitchell Whitfield) is an anthropomorphic guinea pig who plans to claim everything as his. While having a lair that is underground, he uses the Gimme Grabber as his mode of transportation and to aid him in claiming things. In addition, he also wields a Mini-Gimme Grabber as a weapon.
- Mönkey Wrënch (voiced by Jess Harnell) is a rebellious anthropomorphic monkey musician who speaks in rhyme and is armed with an Elec-Tricky Guitar that can do all sorts of tricks. His Mönkey Möbile serves as his mode of transportation and is bigger on the inside.
- Pupsicle (voiced by Taye Diggs in season 1, James Monroe Iglehart in season 2) is an anthropomorphic Siberian Husky with a hermit personality. He wields a freeze gun called the Blizzard Blaster which he often struggles to operate. Pupsicle resides underneath a hill on Metropet Island's Icy Peak, has a tendency to talk to his reflections, and uses the spider-legged Trucksicle for transportation.
- The Slink (voiced by Cynthia Erivo) is an anthropomorphic chameleon and master thief who can turn invisible. Her schemes usually involve competing others in acts which she thinks she is better at.
- Captain Shrimperton (voiced by Megan Hilty) is a shrimp pirate in an oversized pirate captain hat who is the self-proclaimed "Feared Pirate of the Seven Seas".

== Episodes ==
=== Series overview ===
Season	Episodes	Originally released	
Season	Episodes	First released	Last released
1	25	January 17, 2025	November 29, 2025
2	TBA	February 16, 2026	TBA

=== Season 1 (2025) ===
No. overall	No. in season	Title	Directed by	Written by	Storyboarded by	Original release date	Prod. code	U.S. viewers (millions)
1	1	"Pizza Panic"	Diarmuid Donohoe & Declan Doyle	Matt Hoverman	Irene Martini	January 17, 2025	101	N/A
1	1	"Crab-Tastrophe"	Diarmuid Donohoe & Jean Herlihy	Matt Hoverman	Anna Margiotta	January 17, 2025	101	N/A
Pizza Panic: As Team RoboGobo visit Chef Polly's Pet-Zeria for some pizza, the restaurant is invaded by Gimme Pig who plans to claim all the pizzas as his. Team RoboGobo try to take him down separately and together. At Chef Polly's advice, Dax must work to get Team RoboGobo to work together to stop Gimme Pig's pizza heist. Crab-Tastrophe: Dame Luxley calls Dax up stating that she needs someone to watch over her pet hermit crab Crabitha while she is away. Dax enlists Shelly and Wingo to watch over Crabitha. When things go wrong on their way, Shelly and Wingo must rescue Crabitha and work to prove to Dame Luxley that they are good babysitters.
2	2	"Hopper Hears an Ewe"	Diarmuid Donohoe & Jean Herlihy	Annie Nishida	Kinjo Estioko	January 17, 2025	106	N/A
2	2	"Gimme Goes Glam"	John Musumeci	Erica Jones Adams	David Frasquet	January 17, 2025	106	N/A
Hopper Hears a Ewe: Team RoboGobo visits a shepherd named Sam as they meet his sheep Carrie, Gary, Larry, Mary, and Sherry. Soon, Mönkey Wrënch shows up and starts messing with the sheep by turning their wool into different colors. Team RoboGobo must rescue each of the sheep and defeat Mönkey Wrënch. Gimme Goes Glam: Dax takes Allie and Booster to the Heads 'n Tails Salon operated by PJ and Polonious as Allie and Booster have their own way of grooming. Before Dax can have them admitted, Gimme Pig shows up and takes over the Heads 'n Tails Salon when he does not have an appointment. Allie and Booster must work on getting over their differents in order to defeat Gimme Pig.
3	3	"Odd Turtle Out"	Diarmuid Donohoe & Brian O'Brien	Grace Deppe-Waldschmidt	Davide Veca	January 17, 2025	107	N/A
3	3	"The Runaway Raccoon Balloon"	Mårten Jönmark	Andy Guerdat	Aggeliki Salamaliki	January 17, 2025	107	N/A
Odd Turtle Out: Shelly is feeling sad that Wingo is hanging out with Booster more as Dax states that Wingo is still friends with her. They respond to a rescue of trapped arctic fox pups on Metropet Island's coldest mountain Icy Peak. Shelly's issue gets worse when Wingo assists Booster more. A big surprise happens when they find out that the hill that the arctic fox pups were trapped on contains the underground lair of the hermit Pupsicle. When Shelly falls into the trap door, Pupsicle makes a claim that Wingo does not want to be friends with Shelly anymore as she plays along enough for Team RoboGobo to find their way into Pupsicle's lair. The Runaway Raccoon Balloon: Today is Metropet Island's pet parade organized by Clipboard Keith as Team RoboGobo goes to watch it. Raccoon super-fans Risky and Royale get saved by Team RoboGobo after the trash can they were searching for food in rolls away. Afterwards, Risky and Royale put together their own food that they can become heroes like Team RoboGobo, get cheered on, and get food. During the pet parade, Risky and Royale mistake a parade balloon in Crabitha's image used by Dame Luxley as a giant crab monster. They accidentally cause the balloon to fly out of control causing Team RoboGobo to come to their rescue.
4	4	"Birdbath Blizzard"	John Musumeci	Matt Hoverman	Fiona Ryan	January 20, 2025	103	N/A
4	4	"Wingo's Way"	John Musumeci	Story by : Matt Hoverman; Written by : Grace Deppe-Waldschmidt	Céilí Braidwood	January 20, 2025	103	N/A
Birdbath Blizzard: A birdbath owned by Bob Beaks has been frozen by Pupsicle who has turned it into his own ice-skating rink. Now RoboGobo must work to free Bob Beaks' birds and defeat Pupsicle. Wingo's Way: Dax and Wingo lose RoboGobo's Robo-Suits while the others are busy. They must work to reclaim them when they fall into the hands of Gimme Pig.
5	5	"Crabitha First"	John Musumeci	Annie Nishida	Benjamin Sanders	January 24, 2025	112	N/A
5	5	"Into the Mönkey Möbile"	Brian O'Brien	Grace Deppe-Waldschmidt	David Frasquet	January 24, 2025	112	N/A
Crabitha First: While Dax and Booster are at Polly's Pet-Zeria, Dame Luxley shows up with Crabitha as Crabitha's hunger causes her to act entitled. She ends up accidentally trapped in a kelp pizza box when Polly's Pet-Zeria is attacked by Pupsicle who seeks to steal a pizza for himself. Now Dax and Booster must work to rescue Crabitha before Pupsicle makes his way back to his lair. Into the Mönkey Möbile: While doing beach yoga run by Chef Polly, Hopper has a hard time relaxing. Team RoboGobo is called into action by Sean when Prescott the Pig ends up going inside the Mönkey Möbile which appears bigger on the inside. Taking advantage of this, Mönkey Wrënch ends up doing different tricks where the wrong door will send each of Team RoboGobo outside of the Mönkey Möbile. Hopper must learn to relax in order to find the missing pig.
6	6	"The Birthday Bandit"	Mårten Jönmark	Matt Hoverman	Ottavio Roda	January 27, 2025	102	N/A
6	6	"Let's Hear it for Allie!"	John Musumeci	Matt Hoverman	Anna Margiotta & Irene Martini	January 27, 2025	102	N/A
The Birthday Bandit: When preparing for Kev's birthday party, Booster accidentally causes the flour to fall causing Professor Millie to substitute it with oats. Dax and Booster come to the aid of Clipboard Keith when Kev's birthday presents are stolen. They discover that The Slink is responsible and must come up with respectful plans to save Clipboard Keith and the birthday party and thwart The Slink. Let's Hear it for Allie!: As everyone prepares for bedtime, Allie is startled by loud noises. Team RoboGobo then gets a call from Marisol stating that Mönkey Wrënch is keeping everyone up with his musical performances as well as animating the local objects with his Elec-Tricky Guitar. Team RoboGobo must work to get the Elec-Tricky Guitar so everyone can go to sleep. With Allie still startled by loud noises, Dax must come up with a strategy so that Allie can not be bothered by loud noises and defeat Mönkey Wrënch.
7	7	"A Hop on the Wild Side"	Brian O'Brien	Annie Nishida	Fiona Ryan	January 31, 2025	104	N/A
7	7	"Skatepark Snafu"	John Musumeci	Erica Jones Adams	Ottavio Roda	January 31, 2025	104	N/A
A Hop on the Wild Side: Team RoboGobo visits Metropet Island's Wild Side to help with construction as Hopper has a hard time learning to tie a knot. When a baby cougar gets trapped in a cave following a rockslide, Hopper must master the skill of knot-tying to help the others rescue her. Skatepark Snafu: Dax and Booster visit Dax's mother who has invented a device that can turn a swimming pool into a skate park as she does not want Dax to use her special wrench. While she is away attending to an ice cream mishap, Dax tries to fix it on his own and accidentally traps Crabitha on top of the skate ramp causing Dax and Booster to work to get her down.
8	8	"The Water Wheel Steal"	John Musumeci	Grace Deppe-Waldschmidt	Ottavio Roda	February 7, 2025	109	N/A
8	8	"We Got the Tweet"	Brian O'Brien	Andy Guerdat	Irene Martini	February 7, 2025	109	N/A
The Water Wheel Steal: Professor Millie has unveiled a new water wheel for Metropet Island. It soon gets targeted by Gimme Pig. Unfortunately, his heist does not go the way he hoped and gets trapped on the wheel alongside some other pets. Team RoboGobo take toys and use them to rescue Gimme Pig and the pets. We Got the Tweet: Team RoboGobo goes birdwatching with Bob Beaks. Their activity is crashed by Mönkey Wrënch who uses his Elec-Tricky Guitar to change the voices of the birds. When Team RoboGobo takes action, Mönkey Wrënch messes with their Robo-Radios making them unable to speak to each other. Booster must learn how to master charades so that they can defeat Mönkey Wrënch and undo what he has done.
9	9	"A Sparkle in the Dark"	Mårten Jönmark	Erica Jones Adams	Benjamin Sanders	February 14, 2025	108	N/A
9	9	"The Towering Inflato"	John Musumeci	Annie Nishida	David Frasquet	February 14, 2025	108	N/A
A Sparkle in the Dark: Late one night, Dax and Allie befriend a firefly named Flicker who is afraid of the dark and has a hard time turning on his light. His firefly swarm is abducted by The Slink so that they can power her nightlight. Dax and Allie must teach Flicker how to get over her fear of the dark so that they can rescue the fireflies. The Towering Inflato: Professor Millie has put up a new building that Team RoboGobo sees the opening to. Unfortunately, it gets turned into a bounce house by Mönkey Wrënch. As most of the people and pets are evacuated, the only animal left is a porcupine named Poppy who is owned by Frances. Hopper must find a way to keep a frightened Poppy from shooting her quills at the bounce house so that Team RoboGobo can defeat Mönkey Wrënch and restore the building to normal.
10	10	"The Arcade Raid"	Mårten Jönmark	Annie Nishida	Davide Veca	February 21, 2025	110	N/A
10	10	"Homestead Stampede"	Brian O'Brien	Erica Jones Adams	Kinjo Estioko	February 21, 2025	110	N/A
The Arcade Raid: Team RoboGobo attend an arcade that is run by Grant and Oliver. Shelly loves to play the claw machine, but the time at the arcade is ruined when Gimme Pig shows up and uses a giant claw to steal all the prizes. Shelly must avoid getting distracted while Team RoboGobo must work to thwart Gimme Pig's heist. Homestead Stampede: Allie accompanies Dax and Dr. Vaughn to the farm of Farmer Faye where she meets the horses Hurricane, Happy, and their son Henry as Allie gets frightened by them at first. Meanwhile, Risky and Royale are rummaging through Farmer Faye's garbage and accidentally start a horse stampede. Allie must tap into her inner cowgirl in order to stop the stampede and rescue Risky and Royale.
11	11	"The Raccoons Who Cried Rescue"	John Musumeci	Story by : Annie Nishida; Written by : Andy Guerdat	Davide Veca	February 28, 2025	114	N/A
11	11	"Jumpin' Jaguars"	Mårten Jönmark	Grace Deppe-Waldschmidt	Ilenia Gennari	February 28, 2025	114	N/A
The Raccoons Who Cried Rescue: Risky and Royale's supefandom of Team RoboGobo leads to them wanting to be rescued. They pull off different incidents that attract Team RoboGobo to them. When one of their planned rescues goes wrong, Team RoboGobo must work to rescue them. Jumpin' Jaguars: At the Wild Side, Dax and Allie meet the young jaguars, Joe, Jade, and Jazz. Joe is shown to have been born without a limb which he has in common with Dax. After Jade and Jazz get trapped in the cave and The Slink hinders Dax and Allie's rescue of them, Joe must overcome his disability to help Dax and Allie defeat The Slink and rescue his sisters.
12	12	"Bouncy Ball Baddie"	Mårten Jönmark	Story by : Andy Guerdat; Written by : Jackie Lebovits	Irene Martini	March 7, 2025	113	N/A
12	12	"Spray Paint Showdown"	Brian O'Brien	Erica Jones Adams	Ottavio Roda	March 7, 2025	113	N/A
Bouncy Ball Baddie: At the Wild Side, Park Ranger Pep takes Team RoboGobo to where the splashing geysers are. Just then, Mönkey Wrënch arrives and makes the geysers shoot bouncing balls. As most of the nearby animals are evacuated, the one animals left are a family of red foxes who are in their burrow. Hopper goes underground to try to rescue them and ends up being fluffy towards them. When Booster goes underground to check up on Hopper, his way to get them to evacuate does not go according to plan. Hopper must work to teach Booster how to be tough and fluffy in order to evacuate the red foxes and defeat Mönkey Wrënch. Spray Paint Showdown: The monkey artist Cappuchino is in town as he works on his latest mural. Shelley is also shown to be an artist and shows off her painting skills about different feelings. What she cannot figure out is a picture that represents angry. Cappuchino's event is crashed by The Slink who is defacing a lot of stuff. Shelley must figure out how to make an angry picture while defeating The Slink at the same time.
13	13	"Allie Oops!"	Mårten Jönmark	Andy Guerdat	Kinjo Estioko	March 14, 2025	105	N/A
13	13	"The Great Bridge Face-Off"	Brian O'Brien	Grace Deppe-Waldschmidt	Aggeliki Salamaliki	March 14, 2025	105	N/A
Allie Oops!: On Groundhog Day, the comical Gus the Groundhog has seen his shadow. Unfortunately, his event is crashed by Pupsicle who plans to make sure that winter never ends and forms an ice dome around Gus' burrow and himself while keeping Team RoboGobo from melting it. With Allie under the dome, Gus must teach her how to be comical in order to defeat Pupsicle and bring down the ice dome. The Great Bridge Face-Off: When Park Ranger Pep shows off a new bridge at the Wild Side, she, Dax, Shelly and Wingo find it in need of repairs as most of the animals need to get to the river below. Wingo manages to do the job with lack of patience much to the annoyance of Dax. Soon, The Slink shows up and starts tampering with the bridges on the different levels. Dax must teach Wingo how to be patient so that he can help the animals get to the river and defeat The Slink.
14	14	"Crab-Cuffed"	John Musumeci	Erica Jones Adams	David Frasquet	March 21, 2025	115	N/A
14	14	"Bees is for Booster"	Brian O'Brien	Story by : Andy Guerdat; Written by : Katiedid Langrock	Kinjo Estioko	March 21, 2025	115	N/A
Crab-Cuffed: As Shelly and Wingo have a disagreement, Dame Luxley plans to display the latest tiara with help from a security system. Crabitha stays by the tiara. When both Gimme Pig and The Slink target the tiara, Crabitha Crab-Cuffs them together causing them to struggle to get away. Dax must get Shelly and Wingo to talk out their issue to rescue Crabitha and the tiara and defeat Gimme Pig and The Slink. Bees is for Booster: At the Wild Side, Park Ranger Pep tells Team RoboGobo about the growth of the MetroPetunia that the bees are going to harvest the pollen from in order to make their honey. Unfortunately, Gimme Pig steals the MetroPetunias from underground as part of a plot to make his own honey which keeps going wrong for him since only bees can make honey. After Booster returns the MetroPetunias back to their spot, he accidentally gets a bee into his suit and speeds around in a panic aggravating the bees. Now Dax must work to get Booster to act calm even before Gimme Pig plans to take the beehive.
15	15	"Pedal to the Medal"	Mårten Jönmark	Grace Deppe-Waldschmidt	Irene Martini	March 28, 2025	117	N/A
15	15	"When You Wrench Upon a Star"	John Musumeci	Sean Jara	Davide Veca	March 28, 2025	117	N/A
Pedal to the Metal: During a pet race overseen by Dax and Booster, a lizard named Russell wins the race. When given his medal, he struggles to get to the first place podium. The award ceremony is then crashed by Gimme Pig who steals the medal as Russell works to reclaim it. Russell must learn to ask for help so that Dax and Booster can rescue his medal and defeat Gimme Pig. When You Wrench Upon a Star: During a backyard campout, Shelly makes a wish upon a star. Overhearing it, Mönkey Wrënch uses his Elec-Tricky Guitar to make Allie's ball of yarn become big, Booster's frisbee to evade him, Hopper's Rocket Rabbit action figure to fly off, and Wingo to have the hiccups. As Shelly works to make a wish to help Team RoboGobo help, she learns that she does not need a wish upon a star as she works to help Team RoboGobo stop the runaway yarnball and defeat Mönkey Wrënch.
16	16	"Get-A-Pet Day"	Mårten Jönmark	Jackie Lebovits	Lara Kane	April 4, 2025 (Note: This episode was first released on Disney+ on April 1, 2025.)	122	N/A
16	16	"The Mess-Making Machine"	Brian O'Brien	Grace Deppe-Waldschmidt	Aggeliki Salamaliki	April 4, 2025	122	N/A
Get-A-Pet-Day: Team RoboGobo is hosting a pet adoption day. When most of the pets are adopted in different parts of Metropet Island, the one pet that has not been adopted is a tarantula named Terry. It was also noted by Team RoboGobo that a man named Mr. Gramble has not attended one of the adoption days. Things take a turn for the worse when Terry gets frightened up Mr. Gramble's apartment building as Team RoboGobo works to rescue him. The Mess-Making Machine: Team RoboGobo works on collecting garbage around Metropet Island. Risky and Royale soon end up getting involved so that they can have the edible garbage that is collected. Things go bad when Mönkey Wrënch uses his Elec-Tricky Guitar to make the dumpsters dump garbage everywhere. Risky and Royale now must work with Team RoboGobo to thwart the spilling garbage and defeat Mönkey Wrënch.
17	17	"The Eggy Sitter's Club"	Mårten Jönmark	Grace Deppe-Waldschmidt	Benjamin Sanders	April 11, 2025	123	N/A
17	17	"Gimme Grabs Gill"	John Musumeci	Erica Jones Adams	Kinjo Estioko	April 11, 2025	123	N/A
The Eggy Sitter's Club: At the Wild Side, Park Ranger Pep enlists Dax and Hopper to look after a rare bird egg while she takes some monkeys on a field trip. When the monkeys become to much to handle, Dax leaves Hopper in charge of the egg. As Hopper watches over the egg as different animals gather around it, it soon ends up stolen by Gimme Pig. Dax is informed of what happened as Hopper works to defeat Gimme Pig and reclaim the egg. Gimme Grabs Gill: Chef Polly has brought Gill to Dr. Vaughn for a first checkup. Though Gill is reluctant to go through with it and accidentally ends up on a runaway cart. Team RoboGobo and Dr. Vaughn race after Gill so that Gill can get his first check-up. Though things get complicated when Gill ends up abducted by Gimme Pig. Now Team RoboGobo must rescue Gill and defeat Gimme Pig.
18	18	"Happy Dad's Day"	Mårten Jönmark	Andy Guerdat	Aggeliki Salamaliki	April 18, 2025	111	N/A
18	18	"Bye Bye Blankie"	John Musumeci	Jackie Lebovits	Ilenia Geranni	April 18, 2025	111	N/A
Happy Dad's Day: Dax is planning on spending Dad's day with his father Dr. Vaughn. He has some setbacks when it comes to tending some animals. When it comes to Dr. Vaughn tending to two elephants at the Wild Side, Dax, Shelly, and Wingo look after a young elephant calf named Little Esme who ends up wandering off. When they catch up to her, Dax, Shelly, and Wingo must improvise the presence of Little Esme's father in order to get her to nap until her parents can arrive. Bye Bye Blankie: Team RoboGobo plans to donate some of their stuff to an event organized by Clipboard Keith as Booster is unable to give up his blanket. Dame Luxley donates one of Crabitha's old tiaras. The event is crashed by The Slink who makes off with some stuff and is followed into tube by a skunk named Sweetie who accidentally sprays her. As Team RoboGobo pursues The Slink, Booster must work to track down The Slink and Sweetie.
19	19	"The Slink's Sidekicks"	Brian O'Brien	Story by : Andy Guerdat; Written by : Brandon Violette	Ilenia Gennari	May 2, 2025	121	N/A
19	19	"Wide Side Slide"	John Musumeci	Erica Jones Adams	Davide Veca	May 2, 2025	121	N/A
The Slink's Sidekicks: Risky and Royale want to help out when Eunice finds her snake Sugar napping on a tree branch that she might fall off of. When Risky and Royale try to help, they end up being saved by Team RoboGobo instead. Needing a team of her own, The Slink dupes Risky and Royale into working for her as they steal Dame Luxley and Crabitha's necklaces. Due to Riskey and Royale's bad steering of the Sneaky Slinker, Team RoboGobo must work to save them and The Slink as well as recovering the stolen necklaces. Wide Side Slide: After Dr. Vaughn tends to a penguin named Penny, Dax and Hopper take her to Icy Peak to rejoin her Penny's penguins. There is a new slide there which the penguins are playing on as Penny gets weary of it. Dax and Hopper understand and work to help her conquer her fear. Things get complicated when Pupsicle disrupts the activity with this Mecha Mutt-sicles. When they and Pupsicle cause problems for everyone, Penny must get over her fears by sliding down the slide to safety while Dax and Hopper deal with Pupsicle and his Mutt-sicles.
20	20	"No Platypus Like Home"	Brian O'Brien	Jackie Lebovits	Akis Dimitrakopoulos	June 6, 2025	119	N/A
20	20	"Roller Rink Rumble"	Mårten Jönmark	Erica Jones Adams	David Frasquet	June 6, 2025	119	N/A
No Platypus Like Home: Dax, Shelly, and Wingo are summoned to the Wild Side by Park Ranger Pep because of a strange animal sighting. They find that it is a platypus named Paolo. Dax, Shelly, Wingo, and Park Ranger Pep work to find Paolo a home. Because of Paolo's appearances, they start with a family of ducks where Paolo cannot fly. Then they try a family of beavers where he cannot cut down a tree. Paolo runs off as Dax, Shelly, Wingo, and Park Ranger Pep work to find him before time is up. Roller Rink Rumble: Team RoboGobo are at the roller rink. As Clipboard Keith plans to close for the night, Hopper and Hector are unable to stop skating. The roller rink is then crashed by Mönkey Wrënch who uses his Elec-Tricky Guitar to make the roller skates move on their own. This also affects the roller skates worn by Hopper and the other patrons as well as Hector's hamster ball. Team RoboGobo works to save the patrons from the out of control roller skates. Once Hopper is freed, he helps Team RoboGobo to rescue Hector and defeat Mönkey Wrënch.
21	21	"The Chirp Chasers"	Brian O'Brien	Story by : Andy Guerdat; Written by : Katiedid Langrock	Irene Martini	July 4, 2025	124	N/A
21	21	"Play Day"	John Musumeci	Jey McKinley	Akis Dimitrakopoulos	July 4, 2025	124	N/A
The Chirp Chasers: On a rainy day, Dr. Vaughn tells RoboGobo and Dax to play quietly due to a bat sleeping, just then a cricket is on the loose and they have to stop him from making noise. But it turns out, the cricket chirping is making the bat calm down. Play Day: Dax and Booster must stop The Slink from stealing the role of Little Miss Muffet played by Dame Luxley before the play starts.
22	22	"Mammoth Meltdown"	Brian O'Brien	Story by : Annie Nishida; Written by : Jackie Lebovits	Benjamin Sanders	August 8, 2025	116	N/A
22	22	"Silly Suit Switch-A-Roo"	Märten Jönmark	Grace Deppe-Waldschmidt	Irene Martini	August 8, 2025	116	N/A
Mammoth Meltdown: Dax comes across Shelly and Wingo trying to open a pineapple as Professor Maxwell teaches them a trick her mother taught her to peel a pineapple. Dax then gets a call from his dad about the new prehistoric exhibit containing a perfectly preserved woolly mammoth. Pupsicle gets the idea to claim the woolly mammoth as his pet. Unfortunately, his Trucksicle combined with a tug-of-war with Shelly frees the woolly mammoth who runs off with Pupsicle. Shelly must use her smarts to rescue Pupsicle and stop the woolly mammoth. Silly Suit Switch-A-Roo: Dax has the pets do something different like taking a sunset walk. They get a call from Park Ranger Pep that the animals have woken up in the wrong homes and Mönkey Wrënch is to blame. When Team RoboGobo arrives at the Wild Side, they work to restore all the animals to their homes. Unfortunately, Mönkey Wrënch uses his Elec-Tricky Guitar to switch the Robo-Suits of Team RoboGobo. Allie ends up in Booster's Robo-Suit, Booster ends up in Wingo's Robo-Suit, Wingo ends up in Allie's Robo-Suit, Shelly ends up in Hopper's Robo-Suit, and Hopper ends up in Shelly's Robo-Suit. Team RoboGobo must work to master each other's Robo-Suit in order to rescue the animals and defeat Mönkey Wrënch.
23	23	"The Maze of Mystery"	John Musumeci	Story by : Andy Guerdat; Written by : Erica Jones Adams	Angeliki Salamaliki	October 3, 2025	118	N/A
23	23	"Scaredy Bat"	Brian O'Brien	Grace Deppe-Waldschmidt	Kinjo Estioko	October 3, 2025	118	N/A
The Maze of Mystery: Team RoboGobo is on a search for someone who is secretly taking treats and gifts at an autumn festival. Scaredy Bat: The Slink goes on a scaring spree at an amusement park.
24	24	"Family Fun Night Fiasco"	Mårten Jönmark	Chris Gilligan	Ilenia Gennari	October 24, 2025	125	N/A
24	24	"Team Baddie"	Brian O'Brien	Chris Gilligan	David Frasquet	October 24, 2025	125	N/A
Family Fun Night Fiasco: Hopper wants to have a party with Dax's family and his animal comrades, but their preparations keep getting hampered when they need to take on a villain causing trouble in town like Mönkey Wrënch affecting the Barber-Bots at the Heads N' Tails Salon, Gimme Pig trying to steal the river's water from the Wild Side, and Pupsicle freezing everything at the Petzeria....until he gets into an argument with The Slink over who is the better baddie. Team Baddie: With Team RoboGobo having defeated each of the villains, The Slink gets the idea to bring Gimme Pig, Mönkey Wrënch, and Pupsicle together as Team Baddie. Using their tactics that involves Gimme Pig targeting Dame Luxley's pearl, The Slink putting Pupsicle's control device on Crabitha in order to control her, and Mönkey Wrënch growing her to giant size. Using a combination of the RoboGobo Rocket and the Team RoboGobo's suits, Team RoboGobo form RoboJumbo and must work as one to free Crabitha while restoring her to normal size, defeating Team Baddie, and reclaiming the pearl.
25	25	"Frost-ival of Lights"	Mårten Jönmark	Jackie Lebovits	David Frasquet	November 29, 2025	120	N/A
25	25	"Hoppy Holidays"	Jayesh Jagdish Yatgirl	Erica Jones Adams	Benjamin Sanders	November 29, 2025	120	N/A
Frost-ival of Lights: Pupsicle freezes the flowing waters of Metropet Island so the water wheel generator will cease making electricity and the place will have no lights. Hoppy Holidays: Gimme Pig goes on a robbing spree, taking gifts from one house to another.

=== Season 2 (2026) ===
No. overall	No. in season	Title	Directed by	Written by	Storyboarded by	Original release date	Prod. code	U.S. viewers (millions)
26	1	"Robo-Riders"	Mårten Jönmark	Nida Chowdhry	Fiona Ryan	February 16, 2026	TBA	N/A
26	1	"Super Robo-Raccoons"	Brian O'Brien	Rachel Reuben	Martin Fagan	February 16, 2026	TBA	N/A
Robo-Riders: Dax upgrades his animal buddies’ robosuits in a way with the ability to transform into vehicles. Super Robo-Raccoons: Mönkey Wrënch's magical guitar falls into the hands of Risky and Royale who try to help their community with its powers.
27	2	"The Fast and the Furriest"	John Musumeci	Kristen McGregor	Angeliki Salamaliki	February 16, 2026	TBA	N/A
27	2	"Turtle Tot Tizzy"	Mårten Jönmark	Rachel Reuben	Lara Kane	February 16, 2026	TBA	N/A
The Fast and the Furriest: Booster learns that going slower is sometimes better while trying to stop Gimme Pig from controlling the train inside the tubes. Turtle Tot Tizzy: A young sea turtle named Tilly enters Shelly’s robosuit and causes some frenzy.
28	3	"Crabitha's Birthday Shellebration"	Brian O'Brien	Nida Chowdhry	Akis Dimitrakopoulos	February 16, 2026	TBA	N/A
28	3	"Upgrade to the Dax"	John Musumeci	Carleton Carter	Benjamin Sanders	February 16, 2026	TBA	N/A
Crabitha's Birthday Shellebration: The Slink crashes Crabitha's birthday party to steal the crustacean's tiara. Upgrade to the Dax: Dax experiments some enhancements on Hopper's robosuit for a science exhibit. Unfortunately, Pupsicle crashes out there and freezes everyone to make the science fair to be quiet.
29	4	"Turtle-y Safe"	John Musumeci	Leore Berris	Irene Martini	February 16, 2026	TBA	N/A
29	4	"Bridge Over Flooded Water"	Mårten Jönmark	Carleton Carter	Angeliki Salamalliki	February 16, 2026	TBA	N/A
Turtle-y Safe: Shelly adds extra protection to her and her comrades' RoboSuits, but the changes offer no help when an emergency comes especially when Pupsicle freezes MetroPet Island. Bridge Over Flooded Water: Dax and Allie need to build a higher bridge as the rain increases the water levels.
30	5	"Dax and the Giant Tree"	Brian O'Brien	Jey McKinley	Ottavio Roda	February 16, 2026	TBA	N/A
30	5	"Pupsicle Catches a Cold"	John Musumeci	Rachel Reuben	Ilenia Gennari	February 16, 2026	TBA	N/A
Dax and the Giant Tree: When Dax and his pet comrades want an apple sapling to grow into a tree soon, they get their wish from Mönkey Wrënch. Though it is beyond what they are expecting. Pupsicle Catches a Cold: Pupsicle has the sniffles, but does not want to warm up or have a break from his villain activities. Things get complicated when Pupsicle's doting grandfathers Heath and Hank come to visit and attempt to help out.
31	6	"Mother's Day Mayhem"	John Musumeci	Carleton Carter	Benjamin Sanders	February 16, 2026	TBA	N/A
31	6	"Gimme Pup"	John Musumeci	Carleton Carter	Benjamin Sanders	February 16, 2026	TBA	N/A
Mother's Day Mayhem: Dax and his animal buddies take Dax’s Mom to a science museum as a Mother's Day gift, but find themselves in a rescue mission when The Slink takes over the place. Gimme Pup: Gimme Pig befriends and persuades a dog to steal stuff at a comic convention.
32	7	"Yarn Ball Blitz"	Mårten Jönmark & Jayesh Jagdish Yatgirl	Rachel Reuben	Naoise Dempsey	February 16, 2026	TBA	N/A
32	7	"Wild Side Swap"	John Musumeci	Nida Chowdhry	John Leard	February 16, 2026	TBA	N/A
Yarn Ball Blitz: Gimme Pig takes a huge yarn ball from a festival held by Farmer Faye and uses it to get anything he drives it into where Farmer Faye and Sam are accidentally trapped in the yarn ball. Wild Side Swap: Mönkey Wrënch uses his guitar to teleport animals from the Wild Side to the City Side. Once Team RoboGobo fixes that, Mönkey Wrënch then transports some of the City Side's animals to the Wild Side.
33	8	"Jurassic Joyride"	Brian O'Brien	Dana Starfield	Angeliki Salamaliki	February 16, 2026	TBA	N/A
33	8	"Robo-Arm Alarm"	Manu Mathew	Carleton Carter	Ilenia Gennari	February 16, 2026	TBA	N/A
Jurassic Joyride: Mönkey Wrënch uses his guitar to animate a Tyrannosaurus skeleton which starts running across the island. Though it ends up being too much for him to control. Robo-Arm Alarm: Booster and Hopper accidentally damage Dax's electronic arm and are afraid to tell him about it while stopping Gimme Pig causing trouble at the Ani-Mall.
34	9	"Sledding to the Rescue"	Brian O'Brien	Jey McKinley	Ottavio Roda	February 16, 2026	TBA	N/A
34	9	"Wild Side Car Wash"	Brian O'Brien	Jey McKinley	Ottavio Roda	February 16, 2026	TBA	N/A
Sledding to the Rescue: Pupsicle hampers a sled race where Dax and Booster are participating. Wild Side Car Wash: While Team RoboGobo are watching Titanic on Netflix on their TV in the HQ, they are called by Park Ranger Pep to head to rescue her and Paolo who are stuck in a treehouse in Icy Peak's freezing weather, but they have to clean off the mud that is crippling their vehicles.
35	10	"Turbo Trash Take-Off"	Mårten Jönmark & Manu Mathew	Rachel Reuben	Akis Dimitrakopoulos	February 16, 2026	TBA	N/A
35	10	"Mönkey Sheep Mönkey Do"	John Musumeci	Kristen McGregor	Jose Guzman	February 16, 2026	TBA	N/A
Turbo Trash Take-Off: Risky and Royale build a car out of trash, but forgot to add brakes. It is up to Team RoboGobo to save them before they crash. Mönkey Sheep Mönkey Do: Monkey Wrënch keeps Team RoboGobo, Sam, and his sheep from passing through a mountain tunnel when they want to enjoy the flowers that Park Ranger Pep told them has grown in.
36	11	"Robo-Race to the Top"	Brian O'Brien	Nida Chowdhry	Benjamin Sanders	March 6, 2026	TBA	N/A
36	11	"Hopper's Missing Toy"	John Musumeci	Jey McKinley	Massimiliano Lucania	March 6, 2026	TBA	N/A
Robo-Race to the Top: When Team RoboGobo rides their vehicles as part of their training, The Slink mischievously rides along, thinking it is race. Hopper's Missing Toy: Booster accidentally loses Rocket Rabbit, the action figure of Hopper, in the pile of hay, which irks the purple bunny who would not work with him when an emergency comes....especially when Mönkey Wrënch causes mischief on the farm.
37	12	"Shrimp or Swim"	Brian O'Brien	Jey McKinley	Ottavio Roda	March 13, 2026	TBA	N/A
37	12	"Gimme the Mönkey Möbile"	Brian O'Brien	Jey McKinley	Ottavio Roda	March 13, 2026	TBA	N/A
Shrimp or Swim: While Team RoboGobo and their friends are leisuring at a beach, their belongings suddenly disappear as a strange fog passes by. This leads them to an encounter with the pirate and new villain Captain Shrimperton. Gimme the Mönkey Möbile: To get away from Dax, Hopper, and Allie after snatching Gatsby's toy, Gimme Pig hides in Mönkey Wrënch's Mönkey Möbile, but the vehicle becomes a trap that he cannot exit. Thus, he reluctantly calls Team RoboGobo to rescue him.
38	13	"Team Robo Raccoon"	Jayesh Jagdish Yatgirl	Nida Chowdhry	Andy Kelly	March 20, 2026	TBA	N/A
38	13	"MetroPep City"	John Musumeci	Kristen McGregor	Angeliki Salamaliki	March 20, 2026	TBA	N/A
Team Robo Raccoon: Risky and Royale invite Hector, Poppy, and Layla to join them as aspiring heroes. MetroPep City: When Team RoboGobo gives Pep and Pablo a tour of the city, Paolo suddenly gets lost.
39	14	"Shrimperton Has a ball"	Jayesh Jagdish Yatgirl	Carleton Carter	Andy Kelly	March 27, 2026	TBA	N/A
39	14	"Cold Dog New Tricks"	John Musumeci	Rachel Reuben	Angeliki Salamaliki	March 27, 2026	TBA	N/A
Shrimperton Has a Ball: Captain Shrimperton steals a ball from two break dancers to create another treasure hunt for Team RoboGobo to solve. Cold Dog New Tricks: A obstacle course for dogs is being invaded by Pupsicle and his Mecha Mutt-sicles.
40	15	"Baby Gimmekins"	Mårten Jönmark & Maeve Garvan	Kristen McGregor	Jose Guzman	April 3, 2026	TBA	N/A
40	15	"Wingo's Wild Airshow"	Brian O'Brien	Jey McKinley	Massimiliano Lucania	April 3, 2026	TBA	N/A
Baby Gimmekins: Gimme Pig takes over Crabitha's stroller so he could stealthily snatch a small rocket from a museum. Wingo's Wild Airshow: The Slink disrupts a bird stunt show hosted by Bob Beaks.
41	16	"Raccoons in the Robo-Dome"	Mårten Jönmark & Maeve Garvan	Carleton Carter	Benjamin Sanders	April 10, 2026	TBA	N/A
41	16	"Booster's Super Nap"	John Musumeci	Nida Chowdhry	Ilenia Gennari	April 10, 2026	TBA	N/A
Raccoons in the Robo-Dome: Risky and Royale’s pursuit of a pizza crust leads them into the home of Team RoboGobo and they explore various locations to find and greet their heroes. Booster's Super Nap: Booster skips his nap time and becomes too tired to help his comrades in a mission.
42	17	"Baby Bunny Brother"	Nicky Phelan & Maeve Garvan	Kristen McGregor	Angeliki Salamaliki	April 17, 2026 (Note: This episode was first released on Disney+ on April 10, 2026.)	TBA	N/A
42	17	"Water Park Plunder"	Brian O'Brien	Rachel Reuben	Andy Kelly	April 17, 2026	TBA	N/A
Baby Bunny Brother: Dax and Hopper help an iguana named Iggy prep for the arrival of his new baby brother, Bill, but Gimme Pig snatches the baby supplies they bought for him. Water Park Plunder: Captain Shrimperton booby traps the MetroPet Island waterpark and Team RoboGobo struggle to save everyone.
43	18	"A Valentine for Pupsicle"	Mårten Jönmark & Manu Mathew	Holly Huckins	Lincoln Adams	April 24, 2026	TBA	N/A
43	18	"Don't Stop the Hop"	Nicky Phelan & Brian O'Brien	Carleton Carter	Massimiliano Lucania	April 24, 2026	TBA	N/A
A Valentine for Pupsicle: Pupsicle threatens to destroy Valentine's Day by wrecking team RoboGobo's Valentines for the island residents. Don't Stop the Hop: Dax, Hopper, Shelly, and Wingo are called to the Wild Side to gather up some jumpy frogs and get them home before their bedtime.
44	19	"Talent Show Takeover"	Brian O'Brien	Rick Suvalle	Benjamin Sanders	May 1, 2026	TBA	N/A
44	19	"Dax's Brrr-thday Bash"	Jayesh Jagdish Yatgirl	Heath Rumble	Jose Guzman	May 1, 2026	TBA	N/A
Talent Show Takeover: The Slink hijacks the MetroPet Island talent show to show off her singing skills, with Dax and Allie being tasked to stop her. Dax's Brrr-thday Bash: Pupsicle attacks the water park during Dax's birthday so he can enjoy a quiet day.
45	20	"Halfpipe Heroes"	John Musumeci	Rachel Reuben	Davide Veca	May 8, 2026	TBA	N/A
45	20	"The Fox and the Sound"	Maeve Garvan	Kristen McGregor	Massimiliano Lucania	May 8, 2026	TBA	N/A
Halfpipe Heroes: Team RoboGobo try convincing a skateboarding kitten named Kimmy to stand up for herself when The Slink challenges her to a skateboarding competition. The Fox and the Sound: Dax and Hopper help a fox kit find his mother while camping at the Wild Side.
46	21	"Robo-Combo"	Maeve Garvan	Brandon Violette	Irene Martinio Roda	May 15, 2026	TBA	N/A
46	21	"Hide 'n Slink"	Brian O'Brien	Kristen McGregor	Benjamin Sanders	May 15, 2026	TBA	N/A
Robo-Combo: Team RoboGobo tries combining their powers to save the island when Gimme Pig accidentally causes a flood. Hide 'n Slink: Dax, Shelly, and Wingo look for The Slink when she challenges them to a game of hide-and-seek.
47	22	"Little Heroes"	John Musumeci	Chris Gilligan	Davide Veca	May 22, 2026	TBA	N/A
47	22	"A Pirate's Life for Crabitha"	John Musumeci	Rachel Reuben	Angeliki Salamaliki	May 22, 2026	TBA	N/A
Little Heroes: Mönkey Wrënch shrinks Team RoboGobo during a day out and they must learn to use their small size to their advantage to stop him. A Pirate's Life for Crabitha: Team RoboGobo go after Captain Shrimperton when she steals Crabitha's pearl and unintentionally kidnaps the crab herself.
48	23	"Hopper's Haunted Halloween"	John Musumeci	Jey McKinley	Andy Kelly	September 29, 2026 (Note: This episode was first released on Disney+ on May 29, 2026.)	TBA	N/A
48	23	"Trick or Trap"	Brian O'Brien	Rachel Reuben	Angeliki Salamaliki	September 29, 2026	TBA	N/A
Hopper's Haunted Halloween: Mönkey Wrënch brings the Halloween decorations at Farmer Faye's farm to life, but Hopper's too scared to be much help. Trick or Trap: Captain Shrimperton steals the islanders treats and uses a treasure hunt to trap Team RoboGobo for good.
49	24	"The Skate Escape"	Mårten Jönmark & Maeve Garvan	Kristen McGregor	Ilenia Gennari	November 6, 2026	TBA	TBD
49	24	"Gimme Friendsgiving"	John Musumeci	Nida Chowdhry	Irene Martini	November 6, 2026	TBA	TBD
The Skate Escape: Gimme Friendsgiving:
50	25	"Risky & Royale's Christmas Wish"	Brian O'Brien	Chris Gilligan	Angeliki Salamaliki	TBA	TBA	TBD
50	25	"Pupsicle's Snow Globe"	John Musumeci	Carleton Carter	Andy Kelly	TBA	TBA	TBD
Risky & Royale's Christmas Wish: Pupsicle's Snow Globe:

== Production ==
=== Development ===
RoboGobo was created by Chris Gilligan, who conceived the idea while his children were young. During bedtime, the family would use props from the bedroom to create scenes and tell stories, some of which featured a rabbit wearing a cybersuit and battling dinosaurs on a volcanic planet. The series was developed by Matt Hoverman and produced by Alexander Lentjes and Nayanshi Shaw, with supervising producers Gillian Higgins and Lorraine Morgan. Michael J. Smith and Declan Doyle, known for Dee & Friends in Oz, serve as supervising directors, while production services and animation are handled by Brown Bag Films. RoboGobo was officially announced as part of Disney Junior's lineup during the Disney Junior Fun Fest event at Disney California Adventure on April 29, 2022. The voice cast was subsequently announced on August 18, 2023.

== Release ==
RoboGobo premiered on Disney Jr. in the United States on January 17, 2025. The series was later released on DisneyNow. It was subsequently made available for streaming on Disney+ on April 1, 2025.

== Reception ==
=== Critical response ===
Hannah Nwoko of Parents praised RoboGobo for emphasizing teamwork and creative problem-solving. She noted that the series effectively teaches children to face challenges, overcome fears, and seek help when necessary. Nwoko highlighted lead character Dax as a positive role model, guiding the super-powered pets with curiosity, inventiveness, and attentiveness. She also complimented the show's inclusive representation, including a Black family and diverse body types, as well as its lighthearted, age-appropriate approach to adventure and conflict. Fernanda Camargo of Common Sense Media rated RoboGobo 3 out of 5 stars, praising the series for its positive messages about perseverance, creativity, and problem-solving. Camargo highlighted lead character Dax as a natural and attentive role model who guides the group while fostering curiosity and inventiveness. She also complimented the show's diverse representations, including a Black Latino protagonist and a cast of animals from various species, as well as its gentle approach to mild adventure and conflict, which never places characters in real danger.

=== Ratings ===
The first episode of RoboGobo was released on YouTube and garnered over 4 million views within two weeks of its debut.
