= 3rd Children's and Family Emmy Awards =

- Date: March 15, 2025
- Location: Television City, Los Angeles, California
- Presented by: National Academy of Television Arts and Sciences
- Hosted by: Eric Bauza

Highlights
- Most awards: Percy Jackson and the Olympians (8)
- Most nominations: Percy Jackson and the Olympians (16)
- Outstanding Preschool Series: Blue's Clues & You
- Outstanding Children's or Family Viewing Series: Fraggle Rock: Back to the Rock
- Outstanding Young Teen Series: Percy Jackson and the Olympians

The 3rd Children's and Family Emmy Awards were presented by the National Academy of Television Arts and Sciences (NATAS), to honor the best in American children's and family-oriented television programming in 2023 and 2024, following on from the 2nd Children's and Family Emmy Awards, which were held in December 2023. The eligibility period ran from June 1, 2023, to May 31, 2024, mirroring that of the Primetime Emmy Awards.

The winners were announced during two ceremonies held at Television City in Los Angeles on March 15, 2025, one focused on creative and technical arts and the other dedicated to performances and programming. Percy Jackson and the Olympians led all programs with eight wins, including Outstanding Young Teen Series. The Lifetime Achievement Award was presented to actress and puppeteer Fran Brill.

== Ceremony information ==
In December 2023, NATAS president Adam Sharp revealed that the 3rd Children's and Family Emmy Awards would change its scheduling from December to a later date within the traditional film awards season, citing feedback from industry members who felt that its previous scheduling disrupted the holiday season.

=== Category changes ===
A number of changes to categories and eligibility criteria took effect for the 3rd Children's and Family Emmy Awards:

- All acting categories were renamed from "Outstanding Performance" to "Outstanding Performer".
- Outstanding Host was renamed "Outstanding Children's Personality", and was restricted to individuals only. Programs with more than one host, co-host, narrator, or storyteller may enter each person individually.
- Outstanding Short Form Program was split into two separate categories for live-action and animated productions, with a time limit of eight minutes for both categories.
- Outstanding Art Direction/Set Decoration/Scenic Design was split into two separate categories for single- and multiple-camera productions.
- Outstanding Main Title and Graphics was renamed "Outstanding Show Open", and is now inclusive of the opening music and/or theme song. As a result, opening music and songs are no longer eligible in either Outstanding Original Song category.
- Submissions in the Outstanding Puppeteer Performer, Outstanding Voice Performance in a Preschool Program, Outstanding Voice Performance in a Children’s or Young Teen Program, Outstanding Younger Voice Performer, Outstanding Single Camera Directing, Outstanding Multiple Camera Directing, and Outstanding Puppet Design/Styling now have the option to include a supplementary behind the scenes or making of video in addition to their required submission video.
- The Outstanding Promotional Announcement award was discontinued.

== Winners and nominees ==
Nominees were announced on December 12, 2024. Winners were revealed at the ceremony on March 15, 2025.

=== Programming ===
Programming
Outstanding Preschool Series: Blue's Clues & You (Nickelodeon); Donkey Hodie (PBS Kids); Lovely Little Farm (Apple TV+); Sesame Street (HBO / Max)	Outstanding Children's or Family Viewing Series: Fraggle Rock: Back to the Rock (Apple TV+); La Fuerza de Creer: Dulce Sazón (Univision); Jane (Apple TV+); Malory Towers (BYUtv); Raven's Home (Disney Channel)
Outstanding Young Teen Series: Percy Jackson and the Olympians (Disney+); Goosebumps (Disney+); Heartstopper (Netflix); One Piece (Netflix); The Spiderwick Chronicles (The Roku Channel)	Outstanding Non-Fiction Program: Stand Up & Shout: Songs From a Philly High School (HBO / Max); All-Round Champion (BYUtv); Elmo & Tango Holiday Helpers (HBO / Max); Kids Baking Championship (Food Network); A Real Bug's Life (National Geographic / Disney+)
Outstanding Preschool Animated Series: The Tiny Chef Show (Nickelodeon); Frog and Toad (Apple TV+); Interrupting Chicken (Apple TV+); Rosie's Rules (PBS Kids); StoryBots: Answer Time (Netflix)	Outstanding Children's or Young Teen Animated Series: Moon Girl and Devil Dinosaur (Disney Channel); CURSES! (Apple TV+); Hilda (Netflix); Iwájú (Disney+); Kiff (Disney Channel); Summer Camp Island (Cartoon Network)
Outstanding Fiction Special: The Velveteen Rabbit (Apple TV+); Monster High 2 (Nickelodeon); The Naughty Nine (Disney Channel); The Slumber Party (Disney Channel); World’s Best (Disney+)	Outstanding Animated Special: Orion and the Dark (Netflix); Merry Little Batman (Prime Video); Peter and the Wolf (HBO / Max); Snoopy Presents: One-of-a-Kind Marcie (Apple TV+); The Tiger’s Apprentice (Paramount+); Tiny Chef's Marvelous Mish Mesh Special (Nickelodeon)
Outstanding Live Action Short Form Program: Elmo and Jesse Remember Uncle Jack (Sesame Workshop); GIRLS’ VOICES NOW: The Beauty in Being Different: Girls’ Voices Now (Here TV); Healthy Minds Thriving Kids (Child Mind Institute); Kid Gloves (Kid Gloves Show)	Outstanding Animated Short Form Program: Once Upon a Studio (Disney+); How Not to Draw (Disney Channel); I Am Groot (Disney+); Take Care with Peanuts (Snoopy – Official Channel); The Wonderful World of Mickey Mouse: Steamboat Silly (Disney+)
Outstanding Interactive Media: Donkey Hodie: Cousin Hodie Playdate (PBS Kids); Cyberchase: Cyber Sound Quest (PBS Kids); Daniel Tiger's Neighborhood (PBS Kids); Molly of Denali (PBS Kids); Stu's Super Stunts! (PBS Kids)	Outstanding Public Initiative: La Fuerza de Creer: Dulce Sazón: La Fuerza-STEM: Engaging Hispanic Families in Science Through Culturally Relevant Media (Univision); Well Versed (Nickelodeon); Honorable Mention: Sesame Street:Sesame Workshop: Emotional Well-Being (Sesame Workshop)

=== Performances ===
Performer
Outstanding Lead Performer in a Preschool, Children's or Young Teen Program: Christian Slater as Mulgarath on The Spiderwick Chronicles (The Roku Channel); Lola Blue as Addie Darrow on A Kind of Spark (BYUtv); Ella Bright as Darrell Rivers on Malory Towers (BYUtv); Justin Long as Mr. Bratt on Goosebumps (Disney+); Raven-Symoné as Raven Baxter on Raven's Home (Disney Channel)	Outstanding Supporting Performer in a Preschool, Children's or Young Teen Program: Amanda Lawrence as Matron Shipley on Malory Towers (BYUtv); Adam Copeland as Ares on Percy Jackson and the Olympians (Disney+); Elizabeth Mitchell as Carol/Mrs. Claus on The Santa Clauses (Disney+); Sarah Rafferty as Katherine Walter on My Life with the Walter Boys (Netflix); Lance Reddick as Zeus on Percy Jackson and the Olympians (Disney+); Eric Stonestreet as Magnus Antas/The Mad Santa on The Santa Clauses (Disney+)
Outstanding Younger Performer in a Preschool, Children's or Young Teen Program: Phoenix Laroche as William on The Velveteen Rabbit (Apple TV+); Pyper Braun as Natasha Williams on Erin & Aaron (Nickelodeon); Noah Cottrell as Simon Grace on The Spiderwick Chronicles (The Roku Channel); Mykal-Michelle Harris as Alice Baxter on Raven's Home (Disney Channel); Alaya High as Lay Lay on That Girl Lay Lay (Nickelodeon); Leah Sava Jeffries as Annabeth Chase on Percy Jackson and the Olympians (Disney+)	Outstanding Children's Personality: Meryl Streep – The Three Questions on Storyline Online (StorylineOnline.net); Awkwafina – A Real Bug's Life (National Geographic); Gavin Friday – Peter and the Wolf (HBO / Max); Duff Goldman – Kids Baking Championship (Food Network); Ian McShane – One Piece (Netflix)
Outstanding Voice Performer in a Preschool Program: Kari Wahlgren as Granny Caterina, Ms. Poochytail & Magda on SuperKitties (Disney Jr.); Kimiko Glenn as Baby Shark on Baby Shark's Big Show! (Nickelodeon); Bobby Moynihan as Bobby Boots on Pupstruction (Disney Jr.); Cree Summer as Lizard & DeeDee on Spirit Rangers (Netflix); Fred Tatasciore as Bang, BlimBlam the Barbarian, King Hydrogen, Alabama Smith & The Lone Drifter on StoryBots: Answer Time (Netflix)	Outstanding Voice Performer in a Children's or Young Teen Program: Eric Bauza as Daffy Duck & Bugs Bunny on Teen Titans Go!: Warner Bros. 100th Anniversary (Cartoon Network); Bob Bergen as Porky Pig on Looney Tunes Cartoons (HBO / Max); Ben Feldman as Tylor Tuskmon on Monsters at Work (Disney+); William Shatner as Keldor on Masters of the Universe: Revolution (Netflix); Paul Walter Hauser as Dark on Orion and the Dark (Netflix)
Outstanding Younger Voice Performer in a Preschool, Children's or Young Teen Program: Jacob Tremblay as Orion on Orion and the Dark (Netflix); Lucia Cunningham as Jessica Williams on Jessica's Big Little World (Cartoon Network); Simisola Gbadamosi as Tola Martins on Iwájú (Disney+); Terrence Little Gardenhigh as Pat on Fright Krewe (Hulu / Peacock); Arianna McDonald as Marcie on Snoopy Presents: One-of-a-Kind Marcie (Apple TV+)	Outstanding Puppeteer Performer: Leslie Carrara-Rudolph as Abby & Tango on Sesame Street (HBO/Max); Eric Jacobson as Bert, Oscar & Grover on Sesame Street (HBO / Max); Donna Kimball as Mokey, Storyteller & Cotterpin on Fraggle Rock: Back to the Rock (Apple TV+); Karen Prell as Red & Icy Joe on Fraggle Rock: Back to the Rock (Apple TV+); David Rudman as Cookie Monster & Baby Bear on Sesame Street (HBO / Max)

=== Writing ===
Writing
Outstanding Writing for a Preschool or Children's Program: Sesame Street: "Can They Be Friends?" – Andrew Moriarty, Katherine Sandford, Ken Scarborough (HBO / Max); A Real Bug's Life: "The Big City" – Sean Abley, Tom Hugh Jones (National Geographic); Sesame Street: "Brave Bessie by Brave Gabrielle" – Monique D. Hall, Ken Scarborough (HBO / Max); Fraggle Rock: Back to the Rock: "I'm Pogey" – Charley Feldman, Maurin Mwombela, Douglas Lyons (Apple TV+); Fraggle Rock: Back to the Rock: "This for That" – Maurin Mwombela, Jocelyn Stevenson, Charley Feldman, Douglas Lyons (Apple TV+)	Outstanding Writing for a Young Teen Program: Percy Jackson and the Olympians: "I Accidentally Vaporize My Pre-Algebra Teacher" – Rick Riordan, Jonathan E. Steinberg (Disney+); High School Musical: The Musical: The Series: "Admissions" – Nneka Gerstle (Disney+); The Spiderwick Chronicles: "The Field Guide to Jared Grace" – Aron Eli Coleite (The Roku Channel); Heartstopper: "Perfect" – Alice Oseman (Netflix); Goosebumps: "Say Cheese and Die!" – Rob Letterman, Nicholas Stoller (Disney+)
Outstanding Writing for a Preschool Animated Program: Molly of Denali: "Not a Mascot" – X'unei Lance Twitchell, Raye Lankford (PBS Kids); StoryBots: Answer Time: "Tornado" – Scott Emmons, Jeff Gill, Chris Harding, Jared Morgan, Evan Spiridellis, Gregg Spiridellis, Nate Theis (Netflix); Jessica's Big Little World: "Glow Toy" – Tiffany Ford, Ashleigh Hairston, Shawneé Gibbs, Shawnelle Gibbs, Matt Burnett, Ben Levin, Dashawn Mahone, Janice Chun, MeeMee Joi Gimes (Cartoon Network); Xavier Riddle and the Secret Museum: "I am Grandmaster Flash" – Desmond Sargeant, Meghan Read (PBS Kids); StoryBots: Answer Time: "Taxes" – Dan Becker, Scott Emmons, Jeff Gill, Chris Harding, Kendall Nelson, Evan Spiridellis, Gregg Spiridellis, Nate Theis (Netflix)	Outstanding Writing for an Animated Program: Moon Girl and Devil Dinosaur: "Dancing With Myself" – Kate Kondell, Halima Lucas, Liz Hara (Disney+); My Dad the Bounty Hunter: "Abducted" – Shakira Pressley, Juston Gordon-Montgomery (Netflix); Craig of the Creek: "Heart of the Forest" – Harron Atkins, Lorraine DeGraffenreidt, Matt Burnett, Ben Levin, Dashawn Mahone, Najja Porter, Jason Dwyer, Leiana Nitura, Ifesinachi Orjiekwe, Ashley Tahilan, Jones Wiedle (Cartoon Network); Hilda: "The Fairy Isle" – Luke Pearson, Stephanie Simpson, Emily Brundige (Netflix); Hailey's On It!: "I Wanna Dance With My Buddy" – Yolie Cortez, Marty Donovan, Mary Gulino, Lindsey Reckis, Devin Bunje, Nick Stanton, Karen Graci (Disney Channel)

=== Directing ===
Directing
Outstanding Directing for a Single Camera Live Action Series: A Real Bug's Life: "The Big City" – Alex Ranken (National Geographic); Percy Jackson and the Olympians: "I Accidentally Vaporize My Pre-Algebra Teacher" – James Bobin (Disney+); The Spiderwick Chronicles: "Welcome to Spiderwick" – Kat Coiro (The Roku Channel); Jane: "Panthera Leo" – Tiffany Hsiung, J. J. Johnson (Apple TV+); Goosebumps: "Say Cheese and Die!" – Rob Letterman (Disney+)	Outstanding Directing for a Multiple Camera Live Action Series: Sesame Street: "The Sign Language ABCs" – Shannon Flynn (HBO / Max); Raven's Home: "Gown To The Wire" – Lynda Tarryk (Disney Channel); All-Round Champion: "Pickleball" – Graeme Lynch (BYUtv)
Outstanding Directing for a Preschool Animated Series: StoryBots: Answer Time: "Glass" – Jeff Gill, Colin Lepper, Evan Spiridellis, Nate Theis (Netflix); StoryBots: Answer Time: "Fractions" – Edlyn Capulong, Kendall Nelson, Evan Spiridellis, Nate Theis (Netflix); Ghee Happy: "Ganga" – Sang Yup Lee (Ghee Happy Studio); Xavier Riddle and the Secret Museum: "I am Grandmaster Flash" – Cory Bobiak, Hong Qi (PBS Kids); Spirit Rangers: "Xutash Harvest" – Dominique Etchecopar (Netflix)	Outstanding Directing for an Animated Series: Moon Girl and Devil Dinosaur: "The Molecular Level" – Samantha Suyi Lee, Ben Juwono, Jen Dickinson (Disney+); Monsters at Work: "Descent Into Fear" – Kay Hayes, Stevie Wermers-Skelton (Disney+); Hilda: "The Fairy Isle" – Andy Coyle (Netflix); Iwájú: "Kole" – Olufikayo Adeola (Disney+); Kizazi Moto: Generation Fire: "Moremi" – Shofela Coker, Andrew McNally, André de Villiers (Disney+)
Outstanding Voice Directing for an Animated Series: Monsters at Work – Kevin Deters & Stevie Wermers (Disney+); Daniel Tiger's Neighborhood – Nathalie Toriel (PBS Kids); Moon Girl and Devil Dinosaur – Sam Riegel (Disney+); Star Wars: Young Jedi Adventures – Eden Riegel (Disney+); Young Love – René Veilleux (HBO / Max)

=== Animation ===
Individual Achievement in Animation
- Kizazi Moto: Generation Fire – Character Design: Lesego Vorster (Disney+)
- Merry Little Batman – Background Design: Philip Vose (Prime Video)
- Merry Little Batman – Character Animation: Elena Najar (Prime Video)
- Merry Little Batman – Production Design: Guillaume Fesquet (Prime Video)
- Orion and the Dark – Background Design: Miho Tomimasu (Netflix)
- Orion and the Dark – Color: Lauren Zurcher (Netflix)
- Snoopy Presents: Welcome Home, Franklin – Storyboard: David Lux (Apple TV+)

=== Art Direction ===
Art Direction
Outstanding Art Direction/Set Decoration/Scenic Design for a Single Camera Program: The Spiderwick Chronicles – Andrew Li, Michael Corrado, Elena Albanese, Ide Foyle (The Roku Channel); Malory Towers – Katie MacGregor, Ceinwen Wilkinson (BYUtv); One Piece – Jonathan Hely-Hutchinson, Mark Walker, Richard Bridgland, Tom Hannam (Netflix); Percy Jackson and the Olympians – Chris Beach, Chad Chilibeck, Raymond Garrioch, Craig Humphries, Benoit Waller, Harrison Yurkiw, Dan Hennah, Hamish Purdy (Disney+); The Santa Clauses – Zak Faust, Amanda Knehans, Melanie Paizis-Jones, Maile Cassara (Disney+)	Outstanding Art Direction/Set Decoration/Scenic Design for a Multiple Camera Program: Bunk'd – Kelly Hogan, Britt Woods (Disney Channel); Sesame Street – Katie Akana, Melissa Farrar, Keith Olsen, Naomi Munro (HBO / Max); The Villains of Valley View – Lissette Schettini, Emily Dawson (Disney+)

=== Casting ===
Casting
Outstanding Casting for a Live-Action Program: Percy Jackson and the Olympians – Candice Elzinga, Denise Chamian and Jordana Sapiurka (Disney+); Heartstopper – Daniel Edwards and Lucy Allen (Netflix); One Piece – Jessica Caldrello, Libby Goldstein, Junie Lowry Johnson and Bonnie Rodini (Netflix); Pretty Freekin Scary – Howard Meltzer and Zachary Spiegel (Disney+); The Spiderwick Chronicles – Denise Chamian and Liz Ludwitzke (The Roku Channel)	Outstanding Casting for an Animated Program: Gremlins: Secrets of The Mogwai – Agnes Kim and Sarah Noonan (HBO / Max); Jurassic World: Chaos Theory – Katie Galvan, Ania O'Hare and Taylor Strait (Netflix); Monsters at Work – Julia Pleasants, Aaron Drown and Colleen Nuño-O’Donnell (Disney+); Orion and the Dark – Katie Galvan and Ania O'Hare (Netflix); Rock Paper Scissors – Amy Zeis, Roxanne Escatel, Liz Paulson, Lauren Leyva and Carolina Martinez (Nickelodeon); Spirit Rangers – Allyson Bosch (Netflix); Supa Team 4 – Magda Cassidy, Richard Lothian, Sue Needleman and Christa Schamberger (Netflix)

=== Choreography and Stunts ===
Choreography
Outstanding Choreography: High School Musical: The Musical: The Series – Zach Woodlee (Disney+); Monster High 2 – Heather Laura Gray (Nickelodeon); World's Best – Bradley Rapier (Disney+)	Outstanding Stunt Coordination for a Live Action Program: One Piece – Frank Spilhaus, Darrell McLean (Netflix); Goosebumps – Dean Choe (Disney+); Percy Jackson and the Olympians – Eli Zagoudakis (Disney+); The Really Loud House – Dorenda Moore, Derik Pritchard (Nickelodeon); The Villains of Valley View – Danny Wayne (Disney Channel)

=== Cinematography and Lighting ===
Cinematography
Outstanding Cinematography for a Live Action Single-Camera Program: A Real Bug's Life – Robert Hollingworth, Alex Jones, Nathan Small, Simon de Glanville (National Geographic); Fraggle Rock: Back to the Rock – Asaf Benny, Gavin Smith (Apple TV+); One Piece – Trevor Michael Brown, Nicole Hirsch Whitaker, Michael Swan, Michael Wood (Netflix); Percy Jackson and the Olympians – Pierre Gill, Jules O'Loughlin (Disney+); The Spiderwick Chronicles – Florian Ballhaus, Lindsay George, Jon Joffin, Alwyn Kumst (The Roku Channel)	Outstanding Lighting, Camera and Technical Arts: A Real Bug's Life – Josh Kingsley-Jones, Tim Watson (National Geographic); Malory Towers – Jason Webber, Dan Evans, Steve Evans (BYU TV); Ruby and the Well – Johnny Askwith, Steven French (BYU TV); Sesame Street – Dan Kelley, Richard Drummond, Tom Guadarrama, Howie Rosenzweig, Lewis Rothenberg, Mark Britt, Jerry Cancel, Shaun Harkins, Mark Renaudin (HBO / Max); The Spiderwick Chronicles – Ian Levine, Tim Moynihan, David Tickell (The Roku Channel)

=== Costumes, Makeup and Hairstyling ===
Styling
Outstanding Costume Design/Styling (Note: Merged with Outstanding Puppet Design/Styling entries.): Fraggle Rock: Back to the Rock – Gina Bennett, Terri Grant, Kim Lennox, Robert Bennett, Pete Brooke, Jason Weber, John Criswell, Alex "Jürgen" Furguson, Joel Gennari, Laura Manns, Anney Ozar, Tina Roland, Sierra Schoening, Dusty Hagerud, Stitcher Sue Hlavenka, Kristi Ann Holt, Dina Meschkuleit, Scott Johnson, Peter Kominek, Rollie Krewson, Kesar Lacroix, Jason Ward, Leo Wieser (Apple TV+); Malory Towers – Melanie Jennings (BYU TV); Monster High 2 – Kathy Houghton, Ellen Anderson (Nickelodeon); One Piece – Hayley Carreira, Jacomina Jankowitz, Diana Cilliers (Netflix); Sesame Street – Allison Green, Sarah Lafferty, Constance Peterson, Tyler Hall, Laura Manns, Michelle Hickey, Lara MacLean, Joshua Holden, Rollie Krewson, Jason Weber (HBO / Max); The Velveteen Rabbit – Debbie Millington, Eimer Ní Mhaoldomhnaigh (Apple TV+)	Outstanding Makeup and Hairstyling: The Santa Clauses – Howard Berger, Erica Preus, Scott Stoddard, Nina Adado, Taylor Bennett, Morgan Ferrando, Patricia Pineda Lansingh, Shay Sanford Fong, Stephanie Kae Panek, Kathleen Freeman, Anissa Salazar (Disney+); Goosebumps – Felix Fox, Harlow McFarlane, Werner Pretorius, Rita Mooney, Tammy Greggain, Parisa Mamdooh, Stephanie Maxcy, Cody Usak, Krista Hann, Sarah Buckley, Riley Harvey, Alex Holmes, Jessica Wong, Zabrina Matiru, Caroline Dehner (Disney+); Monster High 2 – Maddi Bisset, Mike Fields, Jennifer Latour, Raj Mariathasan, Kayla Rowand, Harriet Sales, Amelia Smart, Natalie Warnke, Ashley Forshaw, Lori Sandnes, Makeup Effects Department Head Todd Masters, Yukiyo Okajima, Josh Raymond, Alex Roseberry, Tammy Lim, Julie McHaffie, Gila Bois, Leah Ehman, Debra Wiebe (Nickelodeon); One Piece – Marli Kruger, Amanda Ross-McDonald, Jaco Snyman (Netflix); Percy Jackson and the Olympians – Michael Fields, Ashley Forshaw, Jessica Glyn-Jones, Amanda Mitchell, McLellan, Alysha McLoughlin, Sam Smith, Megan Harkness, Krista Seller, Ciara Allen, Sarah Keen, Jonah Levy, Madison Mah, Jessica Ratsoy, Naomi Bakstad, Jeannie Chow (Disney+); The Really Loud House – Shelley D'Apolito, Joe Rivera, Drew Quentin Burrell, Aleka Kastelic, Renee Majour, Alison Smith, Elicia Vazquez, Michael Solano, Alisha Baijounas, Siobhan Carmody, Jennifer McDaniel, Abril Velez, Lauren Weinstein, Sierra Barton, Sheila Trujillo, Charles E. Yusko (Nickelodeon)

=== Editing ===
Editing
Outstanding Editing for a Single Camera Live Action Program: Percy Jackson and the Olympians – Colleen Rafferty, Stewart Schill, Curtis Thurber (Disney+); Fraggle Rock: Back to the Rock – Morgan Waters (Apple TV+); Goosebumps – Christopher S. Capp, Debby Germino, Tuan Quoc Le (Disney+); The Spiderwick Chronicles – Nicole Brik, Gena Fridman, Rebekah Fridman, Mikki Levi, Lauren Schaffer (The Roku Channel); Stand Up & Shout: Songs From a Philly High School – Tom Patterson (HBO / Max); The Velveteen Rabbit – Sarah Brewerton (Apple TV+)	Outstanding Editing for a Multiple Camera Live Action Program: All-Round Champion – Wyatt Chinn, Marc Fourreau, Craig Passfield, Lindsay Ragone (BYU TV); Erin & Aaron – Nancy Morrison, Dave O'Brien (Nickelodeon); Sesame Street – William D'Amico, Jessica Gidal, Jordan Santora, Rich Woolf Jr., Ed Kulzer, Joseph DiGiacomo (HBO / Max); The Thundermans Return – Michael Karlich (Nickelodeon)
Outstanding Editing for a Preschool Animated Program: StoryBots: Answer Time – Nico Colaleo, Rachael Rusakoff, Evan Spiridellis, Stella Lightheart (Netflix); Frog and Toad – Daniel Dinh, Josh Glass, Nicholas Veith (Apple TV+); Star Wars: Young Jedi Adventures – Louis Legge, Brian Dawley (Disney+); Storybots: Super Silly Stories with Bo – Henry Dalton (Netflix); The Tiny Chef Show – Hamilton Barrett, Mandy Hutchings, Holly Klein (Nickelodeon)	Outstanding Editing for an Animated Program: Orion and the Dark – Kevin Sukho Lee (Netflix); Hilda – Ian McBain, Micheal D. Stefanelli, John McKinnon (Netflix); Moon Girl and Devil Dinosaur – Sandra Powers, Ryan Burkhard, Phil Lomboy (Disney+); Merry Little Batman – Andy Young (Amazon Prime Video); Snoopy Presents: Welcome Home, Franklin – Mat Garneau, Steven Liu (Apple TV+); The Wonderful World of Mickey Mouse: Steamboat Silly – Dao Le (Disney+)

=== Music ===
Music
Outstanding Music Direction and Composition for a Live Action Program: Percy Jackson and the Olympians – Bear McCreary, Omer Ben-Zvi, Brian Claeys, Alexandre Côté, Bailey Gordon, Jesse Hartov, Kelsey Woods (Disney+); The Naughty Nine – Kenny Wood (Disney Channel); One Piece – Toko Nagata, Sonya Belousova, Giona Ostinelli (Netflix); Stand Up & Shout: Songs From a Philly High School – Jaden Alvin, Yasir Barabin, Isaiah Brown-Sheaff, Amir Campbell, Nehiemiah Cole, Megan Early, Jadon Eddings, Niambi Goldstein, Adrian Guzman, Christian Harrison, Danielle Hodges, DaShaun Hudson, Long Huynh, Kemet Kittrell, Andrew Lipke, Taylor Lloyd, Anthony Majewski, Dayani Massey, Tyshawn McNair-Benn, Kristal Oliver, Julyssa Pelliton, Calvin Price, Naika Saint-Pierre, Kalani Saunders, Santee Snaith, Kendall Taggart, Fatou Thoiune, Chisom Udem, Amir Wilkins (HBO / Max); The Velveteen Rabbit – Anne Dudley (Apple TV+)	Outstanding Music Direction and Composition for an Animated Program: Frog and Toad – Mark Evitts (Apple TV+); Gremlins: Secrets of the Mogwai – Sherri Chung (HBO / Max); Looney Tunes Cartoons – Carl Johnson, Joshua Moshier (HBO / Max); Orion and the Dark – Kevin Lax, Robert Lydecker, Vivian Aguiar-Buff, Matt Manna, Alexandra Nickson (Netflix); Star Wars: Young Jedi Adventures – Matthew Margeson (Disney+)
Outstanding Original Song for a Preschool Program: Sesame Street: "That's Why We Love Nature" – Molly Boylan, Benj Pasek, Justin Paul (HBO / Max); StoryBots: Answer Time: "The Tornado Song" – Nick Butcher and Scott Emmons (Netflix); StoryBots: Answer Time: "Find the Area" – Parry Gripp and Scott Emmons (Netflix); Alice's Wonderland Bakery: "Let Your Wish Carry You Away" – Chelsea Beyl, Marisa Evans-Sanden, and John Kavanaugh (Disney Jr.); Baby Shark's Big Movie!: "Keep Swimming Through" – Matthew Tishler (Nickelodeon)	Outstanding Original Song for a Children’s and Young Teen Program: One Piece: "My Sails Are Set" – Sonya Belousova and Giona Ostinelli (Netflix); High School Musical: The Musical: The Series: "Speak Out" – Joshua Bassett, Tova Litvin and Doug Rockwell (Disney+); Hailey's On It!: "Kiss Your Friend" – Devin Bunje, Nick Stanton, Matthew Tishler and Andrew Underberg (Disney Channel); Kiff: "Things" – Lucy Heavens and Nic Smal (Disney Channel); Fraggle Rock: Back to the Rock: "Radishes vs. Strawberries" – Andrew Hey, Harvey Mason Jr., and Sam Ramirez (Apple TV+)

=== Show Open ===
Main Title
Outstanding Show Open
- Percy Jackson and the Olympians – Christian Arnsparger, Alex Rupert, Jeffrey Su, Michael Wang, Jorge Artola, Henry Chang, Lexi Gunvaldson, Merrill Hall, Bear McCreary, Brandon Savoy, Karin Fong, Tosh Kodama, Ruthy Kim, Ella Lee (Disney+)
  - The Fairly OddParents: A New Wish – Patrick Morgan, Dave Stone, Grayson DeWolfe, Chris Serna (Nickelodeon)
  - Hilda – Andy Coyle, Christopher Goettler, Grace Roe, Jean-Luc Sauve, Katrina Jofre, Larissa Gagnier, Ryan Hobbs, Sara Connelly, Scott Lewis, Shamisa Schroeder, Ness Rowett, David Badour, Gillian Reid-Timms, John McKinnon, Ross Love, Phil Lanoix, Ryan Carlson (Netflix)
  - Peter and the Wolf – Elliot Dear, Stephen McNally (HBO / Max)
  - The Spiderwick Chronicles – Jon Block, Dustin Frost, Jason Marconi, Dustin Reno, William Lebeda (The Roku Channel)

=== Sound ===
Sound
Outstanding Sound Mixing and Sound Editing for a Live Action Program: A Real Bug's Life – Brian Moseley, David Yapp, Jonathan Cawte (National Geographic); Goosebumps – Rick Bal, Ken Kobett, Vicki Lemar, Ethan Beigel, Christian Buenaventura, Andy Sisul, Chris Rummel, Eric Huezo, Jeremy Olsen, Henry Auerbach, Mike Pipgras, Iris Dutour, Sanaa Kelley, Matt Salib, Erika Koski, Jordan McClain (Disney+); Jane – David Guerra, Hugo De La Cerda, Sean Karp, Justin Helle, Igor Bezuglov, Paul Williamson, Aravind Sundar, Cailey Milito, Justin Helle, Brandon Bak, Sam Maloney, Patrick Lefler, Ryan Lukasik (Apple TV+); Percy Jackson and the Olympians – Benjamin L. Cook, Mike McKone, Kelly Zombor, Keith Rogers, Jon Wakeham, Michael Baber, Brandyn Marko, Tim Tuchrello, Shaughnessy Hare, Matt Lapthome, Sam Rogers, Ryan Squires (Disney+); The Spiderwick Chronicles – Thomas E. de Gorter, Owen Granich-Young, Ian Tarasoff, Kevin Roache, Adam Sawelson, Thomas Milano, Jeena Schoenke, Michael O'Connor, Lyndsey Schenk, Noel Vought, Jacob Mcnaugton (The Roku Channel); Stand Up & Shout: Songs From a Philly High School – Lewis Goldstein, Rebecca Lindenfeld, Bennett Kerr (HBO / Max); Velveteen Rabbit – Adrian Rhodes, Simon J. Willis, Alistair Sirkett, Peter Gates, Franzi Treutler (Apple TV+)	Outstanding Sound Mixing and Sound Editing for a Preschool Animated Program: Star Wars: Young Jedi Adventures – Heather Olsen, Fil Brown, Melissa Ellis, Robbi Smith, John "J" Lampinen, David Bonilla (Disney+); Baby Shark's Big Movie! – Ryan Greene, Jacob Cook, Jeff Shiffman, Tess Fournier, Alex Heller, Logan Romjue, Katie Jackson, Jayson Niner, Natalia Saavedra Brychcy, Tim Vindigni, (Paramount+); Santiago of the Seas – Jacob Cook, Ian Howard, Brad Meyer, Kenny Carkeet, Logan Romjue, Jayson Niner, Vivian Williams, Carol Ma (Nick Jr.); Shape Island – Kyle O'Neal, Teddy Salas, Brett Hinton, Matt Davies, Brooke Lowrey, Nerses Gezalyan (Apple TV+); Xavier Riddle and the Secret Museum – Glenn Barna, Ryan Eligh, Joe Tetreau, Andrew McDonnell, Sue Robertson, Mike Mancuso (PBS Kids)
Outstanding Sound Editing and Sound Mixing for an Animated Program: Orion and the Dark – Jessey Drake, Jeff Halbert, Marc Schmidt, D.J. Lynch, Rob McIntyre, Laria DeLeon, Matt Festle, Cat Gensler, Grace Stensland, Jason Oliver, Vincent Deng, Laura Macius, Roberto D. Alegria (Netflix); I Am Groot – Kyrsten Mate, Danielle Dupre, Jonathan Greber, Anele Onyekwere, Tom Kramer, David Farmer, Devon Kelley, Margie O'Malley, Frank Rinella (Disney+); Jurassic World: Chaos Theory – Adam Cioffi, Jeff Halbert, D.J. Lynch, Jacob Salerno, Rob McIntyre, Marc Schmidt, Iris Dutour, Sanaa Kelley, Erika Koski (Netflix); Mech Cadets – Kyle Gaffney, Simon Sampath-Kuman, Mark Kondracki, Vijay Rathinam, Jamey Scott, D.J. Lynch, Rob McIntyre, Derek Swanson, Alexander L. Ephraim, Jason Oliver, Derek Swanson, Sukumar Nallagonda, Liang Gao, Junsheng Han (Netflix); Monsters at Work – Eric Freeman, Todd Toon, Nicole A. Fletcher, Doc Kane, Mark Kondracki, Paul McGrath, Odin Benitez, Warren Shaw, Bastien Benkhelil (Disney+); Transformers: EarthSpark – Justin Brinsfield, Ryan Greene, Jordan Griffin, Manny Grijalva, Kody Orris, Jacob Cook, Jeff Shiffman, Brad Meyer, Christine Gamache, Natalia Saavedra Brychcy, Carol Ma (Nickelodeon)

=== Visual and Special Effects ===
Effects
Outstanding Visual Effects for a Live Action Program
- Percy Jackson and the Olympians – Yasmin Blake, Jason Neisewander, Emma Orner, Derrek Brajkovich-Horn, Sonia Contreras, Jacinthe Côté, Yanick Dusseault, Erik Henry, Adele Jones-Venables, Benoit Moranne, Donny Rausch, Mathieu Raynault, Matt Robken, Amanda Newby Fitzgerald, Anthony Safariik, Rick Sander, Daniel Schmid, Philippe Théroux, Justin Bunt, Jose Burgos, Roman Schmidt, Jeff White, Katherine Chambers, Shawn Smolensky, Joel Whist, Luca Bonatti, Simon Marinof, Espen Nordahl, Sylvain Théroux, Mélanie Carignan, Valérie Clément, Stacey MacDonald, Richard Martin, Jessica-Rose Smith (Disney+)
  - Fraggle Rock: Back to the Rock – Seerat Bawa, Colin Campbell, Jenna Gabriel, Michael Key, Lorne Kwechansky, Erin Nicholson, Ken Nielsen, Aditya Sawant, Kevin Chandoo, Matt Hansen, Kathryn Foster (Apple TV+)
  - Goosebumps – Lawren Bancroft-Wilson, Matthew Whittaker, Cristian Camaroschi, Greg Kegel, Blaine Lougheed, Carlo Monaghan, Eddy Moussa, Justin Reimer, Chris Van Dyck, Matthew Lane, Sara Moore, Bob Dewald (Disney+)
  - The Naughty Nine – Felix Arsenault, Marie-Pierre Boucher, Kenneth Caines, Hugo Léveillé, Mark Savela, Terry Hutcheson (Disney Channel)
  - One Piece – Victor Scalise, Jeremy Hattingh, Scott Ramsey, Jason Martorell Parsekian, Machon Du Toit, Michelle Huynh, Nezile Ntutha, Rhett Finch, Cynthia Ludwig and Michelangelo Tegio (Netflix)
  - The Spiderwick Chronicles – Gazzal Dhami, Andy Ritchie, Kim Savory, Jim Thomson, Michael Blackbourn, Mark Dubeau, Kerrington Harper, Curt Miller, Becky Philpott, Stephen Bahr, Paul Copeland (The Roku Channel)

=== Lifetime Achievement Award ===
- Fran Brill

== Shows with multiple nominations ==
Nominations	Series
16	Percy Jackson and the Olympians
13	Sesame Street
13	The Spiderwick Chronicles
11	One Piece
10	StoryBots: Answer Time
10	Fraggle Rock: Back to the Rock
9	Goosebumps
7	A Real Bug's Life
7	Orion and the Dark
6	Malory Towers
6	The Velveteen Rabbit
5	Hilda
5	Monsters at Work
5	Moon Girl and Devil Dinosaur
4	Raven's Home
4	Monster High 2
4	Stand Up & Shout: Songs From a Philly High School
4	Star Wars: Young Jedi Adventures
4	The Santa Clauses
3	All-Round Champion
3	Baby Shark's Big Show!/Big Movie!
3	Frog and Toad
3	Heartstopper
3	High School Musical: The Musical: The Series
3	Iwájú
3	Jane
3	Peter and the Wolf
3	Spirit Rangers
3	The Naughty Nine
3	The Tiny Chef Show
2	Daniel Tiger's Neighborhood
2	Donkey Hodie
2	Erin & Aaron
2	Gremlins: Secrets of the Mogwai
2	Hailey's On It!
2	I Am Groot
2	Jessica's Big Little World
2	Jurassic World: Chaos Theory
2	Kids Baking Championship
2	Kiff
2	La Fuerza de Creer: Dulce Sazón
2	Looney Tunes Cartoons
2	Merry Little Batman
2	Molly of Denali
2	Snoopy Presents: One-of-a-Kind Marcie
2	The Really Loud House
2	The Villains of Valley View
2	World's Best
