= Jane (American TV series) =

2023 American television series

- Promotional poster
- Genre: Adventure; Education; Live-action/Animation; Family; Comedy
- Created by: J. J. Johnson
- Starring: Ava Louise Murchison; Mason Blomberg; Tamara Almeida; Dan Abramovici; Jazz Allen; Sam Marra
- Opening theme: "One Step Closer" performed by Leona Lewis
- Composer: Kyle Rodriguez
- Countries of origin: United States; Canada
- Original language: English
- No. of seasons: 3
- No. of episodes: 20

Production
- Executive producers: J. J. Johnson; Christin Simms; Blair Powers; Matt Bishop; Andria Teather
- Cinematography: Gavin Smith
- Editors: Courtney Goldman; Heath Fashina; Nathan Martinak; Holden Mohring; Emma Zinck
- Production companies: Sinking Ship Entertainment; Jane Goodall Institute

Original release
- Network: Apple TV+
- Release: April 14, 2023 – April 18, 2025

Jane is a live-action animation educational adventure children's television series, created by J.J. Johnson, and premiered on Apple TV+ on April 14, 2023. The series was produced by the Jane Goodall Institute and Canada-based Sinking Ship Entertainment.

Based on the missions of Jane Goodall, the series is about a 9-year old girl, named Jane Garcia who is an aspiring environmentalist whose mission is to save endangered species. Using her imagination, she goes on adventures with her friends David and Greybeard (a chimpanzee) to protect wild animals from around the world.

Each episode focuses on an endangered species and towards the end of each episode, Jane interviews various zoologists to help answer her research question.

The second season was released on April 19, 2024. The third and final season was released on April 18, 2025.

== Premise ==
A young environmentalist, who idolizes Jane Goodall, goes on an adventure with her best friend and a chimpanzee in order to protect the wild animals of the world.

== Production ==
The series was ordered by Apple TV+ in February 2021, with it being a live action-animation hybrid series. It was produced alongside the Jane Goodall Institute. The cast for the series was revealed in January 2023, with Ava Louise Murchison starring in the titular role. The entire series was entirely filmed in Canada (mostly in Toronto), while some episodes were filmed in a location of Costa Rica and Africa.

== Cast and characters ==
=== Main ===
- Ava Louise Murchison as Jane Garcia, a 9-year old girl of a Filipino and Mexican descent, who is an aspiring environmentalist whose mission is to protect endangered species, using her imagination.
- Mason Blomberg as David, Jane's best friend who goes on adventures with Jane, to protect endangered species. He has the same imaginative traits as Jane.
- Tamara Almeida as Maria, Jane's mother who lives in an apartment building.
- Greybeard, a stuffed animal that Jane owns and turns to an animated form of a real chimpanzee from her imagination.

=== Recurring ===
- Paul Sun-Hyung Lee as Mr. Jin (Note: Credited as guest star in episodes 1, 13.)
- Al Rodrigo as Tata, the ex-husband of Maria Garcia and Jane's father. (Note: Credited in episode 2.)
- Dan Abramovici as Lucas, David's father. (Note: Credited in episodes 1, 9, 10, 11.)
- Sam Marra as Kevin (Note: Credited as guest star in episodes 2, 9, 10, 11.)
- Jazz Allen as Millie (Note: Credited in episodes 2, 3, 7, 11.)
- Armando Alera as Cashier (Note: Credited in episode 2.)
- Lucian-River Chauhan as Kurtis
- Marium Carvell as Dawn (Note: Credited in episode 3.)
- Mark McKinney as Mr. Harrison (Note: Credited in episode 3.)
- Mary-Louise Parker as Robin (Note: Credited as guest star in episode 4.)
- Dion Johnstone as Andre (Note: Credited as guest star in episode 5, 11.)
- Samantha Walkes as Toni (Note: Credited as guest star in episodes 6, 13.)
- Brian George as Mr. Siddartha
- Jayne Eastwood as Mrs. Joseph (Note: Credited as guest star in episode 8, 12.)
- Wilfred Lee as Alex (Note: Credited in episodes 8, 13.)
- Marnie Brunton as Lauren (Note: Credited in episodes 8, 13.)
- Graham Greene as James (Note: Credited as guest star in episode 9.)
- Elise Bauman as Annisa (Note: Credited as guest star in episodes 9, 13.)
- Sydney Kuhne as Host (Note: Credited as co-starring in episode 11.)
- Reha Sandill as Saadiya (Note: Credited as guest star in episode 12.)
- Ali Hassan as Amir (Note: Credited as guest star in episodes 12, 13.)
- Ayesha Mansur Gonsalves as Yasmin (Note: Credited as guest star in episodes 12, 13.)
- Chris Pang as Fisherman Max (Note: Credited as guest star in episode 14.)
- Jackie Richardson as Valerie (Note: Credited as guest star in episode 15.)
- James Gangl as Resident/Jeffrey (Note: Credited as co-starring in episode 15.)
- Teanna Weir as Teenager #1 (Note: Credited as co-starring in episode 15.)
- Sharla Sidon as Teenager #2 (Note: Credited as co-starring in episode 15.)

=== Guest ===
- Jane Goodall as herself

== Episodes ==
=== Series overview ===
Season	Episodes	Originally released
1	10	April 14, 2023
2	5	April 19, 2024
3	5	April 18, 2025

=== Season 1 (2023) ===
No. overall	Title	Directed by	Written by	Original release date
1	"Ursus maritimus"	Tiffany Hsiung & J. J. Johnson	Tiffany Hsiung & J. J. Johnson	April 14, 2023
Jane, David and Greybeard are trying to track down a polar bear in the Arctic, thus resulting Jane to convince her neighbor, Mr. Jin (Paul Sun-Hyung Lee) to look at trash differently.
2	"Carcharodon carcharias"	Tiffany Hsiung & J. J. Johnson	Tiffany Hsiung & J. J. Johnson	April 14, 2023
Trying to tag down a great white shark, Jane urges David's dad (Dan Abramovici) and Tata (Al Rodrigo) to think about how they shop for groceries.
3	"Apis mellifera"	Tiffany Hsiung & J. J. Johnson	Tiffany Hsiung & J. J. Johnson	April 14, 2023
David shrinks Jane and Greybeard to resemble a honeybee-sized bee to explore the hive. However, when a schoolmate (Lucian-River Chauhan) attempted to attack the bee, Jane stops him.
4	"Acerodon jubatus"	Warren P. Sonoda & J. J. Johnson	Tiffany Hsiung, J. J. Johnson & Desmond Sargent	April 14, 2023
Jane, David and Greybeard take off on a mission to save the flying fox when Greybeard parachutes into a neighbor's backyard by accident.
5	"Gavialis gangeticus"	Warren P. Sonoda, Tiffany Hsiung & J. J. Johnson	Starlett Hill, Tiffany Hsiung & J. J. Johnson	April 14, 2023
Jane, David and Greybeard try to sniff out why the gharial has a bulbed snout. Luckily, Jane found the answer when she spent a day at the pool.
6	"Balaenoptera musculus"	Tiffany Hsiung, J. J. Johnson	Tiffany Hsiung, J. J. Johnson & Jillian Welsh	April 14, 2023
The three friends travel deep into the ocean to figure out why the blue whale was singing, and Jane confronts a litterbug with a gifted voice.
7	"Danaus plexippus"	Warren P. Sonoda, Tiffany Hsiung & J. J. Johnson	Tiffany Hsiung & J. J. Johnson	April 14, 2023
Jane and Greybeard follow a monarch butterfly's journey that lead them to Mexico, which leads Jane to seek assistance with the help of a person with a green thumb.
8	"Diceros bicornis"	Tiffany Hsiung & J. J. Johnson	Tiffany Hsiung, J. J. Johnson & Jillian Welsh	April 14, 2023
Jane, David, and Greybeard watch over a black rhino and a red-billed oxpecker, whose relationship teachers them the value of teamwork.
9	"Rangifer tarandus"	Tiffany Hsiung & J. J. Johnson	Tiffany Hsiung, J. J. Johnson & Meghan Read	April 14, 2023
Feeling hungry after chasing a herd of caribou, David's grandpa (Graham Greene) tells a story about respect, responsibility and sharing.
10	"Panthera tigris"	Alicia K. Harris & J. J. Johnson	Tiffany Hsiung & Christin Simms	April 14, 2023
Jane and David decided to stay up late to track a tiger that is nocturnal, and stumble upon something in the garden shed.

=== Season 2 (2024) ===
No. overall	No. in season	Title	Directed by	Written by	Original release date
11	1	"Ailuropoda melanoleuca"	Winnifred Jong	J. J. Johnson	April 19, 2024
Jane, David, and Greybeard must reunite a lost baby giant panda with its mother—and find out why they’re the only bears with six fingers.
12	2	"Canis lupus"	Mars Horodyski	Christin Simms	April 19, 2024
Tracking a wolf in the snowy mountains leads the trio to their neighbor’s pug, who helps connect the dots between wolves, dogs, and people.
13	3	"Chlamyphorus truncatus"	J. J. Johnson	Desmond Sargent	April 19, 2024
The three friends use their underground vessel to observe the elusive pink fairy armadillo, but a garden problem stops them in their tracks.
14	4	"Anthozoa"	Shawn Gerrard	Natasha Ramsingh & Nathalie Younglai	April 19, 2024
While exploring the Great Barrier Reef to determine if coral is a plant or an animal, the trio learn that looks can be deceiving.
15	5	"Panthera leo"	J. J. Johnson	J. J. Johnson	April 19, 2024
When David is sick in bed, Jane must partner with an unexpected ally to save Greybeard from a pride of lions.

=== Season 3 (2025) ===
No. overall	No. in season	Title	Directed by	Written by	Original release date
16	1	"Hippopotamus amphibius"	Stephen Reynolds	Story by : Caitlin English; Teleplay by : Aaron Bala & Caitlin English	April 18, 2025
Jane, David, and Greybeard set off to find out why hippos give birth away from their pods, while trying to reunite a baby hippo with her mom.
17	2	"Lasiorhinus krefftii"	J. J. Johnson & Christin Simms	Christin Simms & Andrea Wrauley	April 18, 2025
The trio head underground to dig into wombat defense tactics. Jane wants the community BBQ menu to explore new options.
18	3	"Diomedea exulans"	Mars Horodyski	Joan Digba	April 18, 2025
David joins Jane on a high-flying mission to chart an albatross' journey instead of helping his sister Millie.
19	4	"Loxodonta africana"	J. J. Johnson & Christin Simms	Mark De Angelis	April 18, 2025
Jane convinces her reluctant abuela to help get a baby African bush elephant back to his family, where she uncovers why herds follow a matriarch.
20	5	"Pan troglodytes"	J. J. Johnson	J. J. Johnson	April 18, 2025
Jane and Greybeard lose hope when they see how humans impact chimpanzees in the wild, but David and a special friend restore her faith.

== Release ==
Jane debuted on Friday, April 14, 2023 on Apple TV+. All 10 episodes debuted as part of its first season. The second season was released on April 19, 2024. The third and final season was released on April 18, 2025. Unlike the first season, the following two seasons each contained 5 episodes.

== Reception ==
=== Accolades ===
Award	Date of ceremony	Category	Recipient(s)	Result	Ref.
Children's and Family Emmy Awards	December 16–17, 2023	Outstanding Children's or Family Viewing Series	Jane	Nominated	
Children's and Family Emmy Awards	December 16–17, 2023	Outstanding Writing for a Live Action Preschool or Children's Program	J.J. Johnson, Christin Simms and Tiffany Hsiung	Nominated	
Children's and Family Emmy Awards	December 16–17, 2023	Outstanding Cinematography for a Live Action Single-Camera Program	George Lajtai and Gavin Smith	Nominated	
Children's and Family Emmy Awards	December 16–17, 2023	Outstanding Lighting, Camera and Technical Arts	Mark Baluk, Sam Lewis, George Lajtai and Gavin Smith	Nominated	
Children's and Family Emmy Awards	December 16–17, 2023	Outstanding Visual Effects for a Live Action Program	Jane	Won (Note: Tied with Lost Ollie)	
Children's and Family Emmy Awards	March 15, 2025	Outstanding Children's or Family Viewing Series	Jane	Nominated	
Children's and Family Emmy Awards	March 15, 2025	Outstanding Directing for a Single Camera Live Action Series	Tiffany Hsiung and J. J. Johnson (for "Panthera Leo")	Nominated	
Children's and Family Emmy Awards	March 15, 2025	Outstanding Sound Mixing and Sound Editing for a Live Action Program	David Guerra, Hugo De La Cerda, Sean Karp, Justin Helle, Igor Bezuglov, Paul Williamson, Aravind Sundar, Cailey Milito, Justin Helle, Brandon Bak, Sam Maloney, Patrick Lefler and Ryan Lukasik	Nominated	
Children's and Family Emmy Awards	March 1–2, 2026	Outstanding Preschool, Children's or Family Viewing Series	Jane	Nominated	
Children's and Family Emmy Awards	March 1–2, 2026	Outstanding Writing for a Preschool or Children's Program	TBA	Nominated	
Children's and Family Emmy Awards	March 1–2, 2026	Outstanding Editing for a Preschool or Children's Live Action Program	TBA	Nominated	
Directors Guild of Canada Awards	October 21, 2023	Outstanding Achievement in Sound Editing - Comedy or Family Series	Sean W. Karp, Aravind Sundar and Cailey Milito (for "Apis mellifera")	Nominated	
Directors Guild of Canada Awards	October 21, 2023	Outstanding Achievement in Production Design - Comedy or Family Series	Domini Anderson (for "Danaus plexippu")	Nominated	
Directors Guild of Canada Awards	October 21, 2023	Outstanding Directorial Achievement - Family Series	J.J. Johnson (for "Ursus maritimus")	Nominated	
Directors Guild of Canada Awards	October 28, 2024	Outstanding Directorial Achievement - Family Series	Winnifred Jong & Team (for "Ailuropoda melanoleuca")	Won	
Directors Guild of Canada Awards	October 28, 2024	Outstanding Achievement in Sound Editing - Comedy or Family Series	Sean Karp, Cailey Milito, Aravind Sundar (for "Chlamyphorus truncatus")	Nominated	
GLAAD Media Award	March 14, 2024	Outstanding Kids & Family Programming	Jane	Nominated	
GLAAD Media Award	March 27, 2025	Outstanding Kids & Family Programming	Jane	Nominated	
Hollywood Music in Media Awards	November 15, 2023	Best Original Song in a TV Show/Limited Series	Leona Lewis and Diane Warren (for "One Step Closer")	Nominated	
TCA Awards	August 7, 2023	Outstanding Achievement in Family Programming	Jane	Nominated	
