= Children's and Family Emmy Award for Outstanding Young Teen Series =

Award for Outstanding Young Teen Series

- Awarded for: Outstanding Young Teen Series
- Country: United States
- Presented by: Academy of Television Arts & Sciences
- First award: 2022
- Currently held by: Star Wars: Skeleton Crew (2025)
- Website: theemmys.tv/childrens/

This is a list of winners and nominees of the Children's and Family Emmy Award for Outstanding Young Teen Series, which honors programs both in broadcast and streaming television for viewers aged eleven to fifteen. The category was established at the 1st Children's and Family Emmy Awards in 2022, and is a sister category to the Children's and Family Emmy Award for Outstanding Children's or Family Viewing Series and the Children's and Family Emmy Award for Outstanding Preschool Series, which target shows aimed at younger audiences.

The current holder of the award is the Disney+ sci-fi Star Wars: Skeleton Crew, which won at the 4th Children's and Family Emmy Awards.

== Background ==
On November 17, 2021, the NATAS announced the creation of the Children's and Family Emmy Awards to recognize the best in children's and family television. The organization cited an "explosive growth in the quantity and quality of children’s and family programming" as justification for a dedicated ceremony. Many categories of the awards were previously presented at the Daytime Emmy Awards. Programming aimed towards children and young adults was honored from 1974 to 2021 with the Daytime Emmy Award for Outstanding Children's Series, which was presented under various names across its lifespan, and the Primetime Emmy Award for Outstanding Children's Program, which was presented from 1950 to 2020. Following the establishment of the Children's and Family Emmy Awards, both categories were discontinued.

== Winners and nominations ==
=== 2020s ===
Year	Series	Producers	Network	Ref
2022 (1st)
2022 (1st)	Heartstopper (Season 1)	Iain Canning, Hakan Kousetta, Jamie Laurenson, Euros Lyn, Alice Oseman, Emile Sherman, Patrick Walters (executive producers); Simon Gillis (co-executive producer); Zorana Piggott (producer); Dylan Rees (line producer)	Netflix	
2022 (1st)	Doogie Kameāloha, M.D.	Jesse Bochco, Dayna Bochco, Kourtney Kang, Jake Kasdan, Matt Kuhn, Melvin Mar, Justin McEwen, Erin O’Malley (executive producers); Alison Bennett, Steve Joe (co-executive producers); Megan Mascena, Sasha Stroman (producers)	Disney+	
2022 (1st)	First Day	Libby Doherty (executive producer); Kate Butler, Kirsty Stark (producers); Julie Kalceff (co-producer)	Hulu	
2022 (1st)	High School Musical: The Musical: The Series	Tim Federle (executive producer); Emilia Serrano (co-executive producer); Kimberly McCullough, Zach Dodes (supervising producers); Greg Hampson, Mary Pantelidis, Carrie Rosen (producers)	Disney+	
2022 (1st)	The Mysterious Benedict Society	James Bobin, David Ellender, Phil Hay, Matt Loze, Matt Manfredi, Deepak Nayar, Karen Kehela Sherwood, Todd Slavkin, Darren Swimmer, Jamie Tarses (executive producers); Greg Beeman, Grace Gilroy, Chelsey Lora (co-executive producers); Tony Hale (producer)	Disney+	
2023 (2nd)
2023 (2nd)	The Crossover	Kwame Alexander, Maverick Carter, Daveed Diggs, Kimberly Ann Harrison, Todd Harthan, Jamal Henderson, Lebron James, Damani Johnson, Jay Marcus, Erin O’Malley, Robert Prinz, Bob Teitel, George Tillman Jr., Lezlie Wills (executive producers); Valerie C. Woods (co-executive producer); Ali Kinney (supervising producer); Marsha L. Swinton (producer)	Disney+	
2023 (2nd)	Ghostwriter	J.J. Johnson, Luke Matheny, Andrew Orenstein, Blair Powers, Christin Simms, Kay Wilson Stallings (executive producers); Matthew J.R. Bishop (VFX/executive producer); Carla de Jong, Melanie Grisanti, Lauren Thompson (co-executive producers); Levi Abrino, Sari Friedland (producers); Jordan Geary (creative producer)	Apple TV+	
2023 (2nd)	High School Musical: The Musical: The Series	Tim Federle (executive producer); Zach Dodes, Kimberly McCullough (co-executive producers); Zack Lowenstein (producer); Natalia Castells-Esquivel (co-producer); Skot Bright (producer)	Disney+	
2023 (2nd)	The Mysterious Benedict Society	James Bobin, David Ellender, Phil Hay, Matthew Loze, Matt Manfredi, Deepak Nayar, Karen Kehelan Sherwood, Todd Slavkin, Darren Swimmer, Jamie Tarses (executive producers); Craig Zisk (co-executive producer); Ellen Blum, Tony Hale (producers)	Disney+	
2023 (2nd)	XO, Kitty	Jenny Han, Matt Kaplan, Sascha Rothchild (executive producers); Jennifer Arnold, Aubrey Bendix, Paul Kim, Jessica O'Toole (co-executive producers); Liz Brandenburg, Don Dunn (producers); Seon Kwon Hwang (line producers); Siobhan Vivian (consulting producer)	Netflix	
2024 (3rd)
2024 (3rd)	Percy Jackson and the Olympians	Jeremy Bell, James Bobin, Anders Engstrom, DJ Goldberg, Ellen Goldsmith-Vein, Monica Owusu-Breen, Becky Riordan, Rick Riordan, Jim Rowe, Bert Salke, Dan Shotz, Jonathan E. Steinberg, Jet Wilkinson (executive producers); Shernold Edwards (co-executive producer); Andrew Miller (co-executive producer); Joe Tracz (co-executive producer); John Catron (producer); Zoë Neary (associate producer)	Disney+	
2024 (3rd)	Goosebumps	Caitlin Friedman, Rob Letterman, Iole Lucchese, Neal H. Moritz, Kevin Murphy, Erin O'Malley, Pavun Shetty, Nicholas Stoller, Conor Welch, Hilary Winston (executive producers); Nick Adams, James Eagan (co-executive producers); Courtney Perdue, Baindu Saidu (supervising producers); Justis Greene, Paul M. Leonard, Franklin Jin Rho (producers); Adrian Cox (co-producer)	Disney+	
2024 (3rd)	Heartstopper (Season 2)	Iain Canning, Euros Lyn, Alice Oseman, Emile Sherman, Patrick Walters (executive producers); Simon Gillis (co-executive producer); Zorana Piggott (producer); Emma Biggins, Xavier Roy (line producer)	Netflix	
2024 (3rd)	One Piece (Season 1)	Marty Adelstein, Becky Clements, Tetsu Fujimura, Marc Jobst, Steven Maeda, Eiichirô Oda, Matt Owens, Tim Southam, Chris Symes (executive producers); Diego Gutierrez, Laura Jacqmin, Damani Johnson, Nic Louie, Ian Stokes, Stephen Welke (co-executive producers); Amie Horiuchi, Takuma Naitô, Marisa Sonemann-Turner, Rudi Van As (producers)	Netflix	
2024 (3rd)	The Spiderwick Chronicles	Jeremy Bell, Holly Black, Kat Coiro, Aron Eli Coleite, Tony DiTerlizzi, D.J. Goldberg, Ellen Goldsmith-Vein, Julie Kane-Ritsch (executive producers); Jenn Kao, Dennis Saldua (co-executive producers); Bruce Dunn, Grace Gilroy (producers)	The Roku Channel	
2025 (4th)
2025 (4th)	Star Wars: Skeleton Crew	Jon Favreau, Dave Filoni, Christopher Ford, Kathleen Kennedy, Jon Watts, Colin Wilson (executive producers); Carrie Beck, Chris Buongiorno, Karen Gilchrist (co-executive producers); John Bartnicki, Susan McNamara (producers)	Disney+	
2025 (4th)	Goosebumps: The Vanishing	James Eagan, Karl Frankenfield, Caitlin Friedman, Rob Letterman, Iole Lucchese, Neal H. Moritz, Erin O'Malley, Pavun Shetty, Nicholas Stoller, Conor Welch, Hilary Winston (executive producers); Ben Epstein (co-executive producer); John Mahone and Brian Otaño (supervising producers); Samara Levenstein (producer); Travis Gerdes (associate producer); Brett Derdiger, Mariko Tamaki, and Dana Zolli (co-producers)	Disney+	
2025 (4th)	Heartstopper	Iain Canning, Euros Lyn, Alice Oseman, Emile Sherman, Patrick Walters (executive producers); Simon Gillis (co-executive producer); Brett Thomas (producer)	Netflix	
2025 (4th)	Sweet Tooth	Amanda Burrell, Robert Downey Jr., Susan Downey, Jim Mickle, Linda Moran (executive producers); Toa Fraser, Noah Griffith, Bo Yeon Kim, Erika Lippoldt, Oanh Ly, Evan Moore, Daniel Stewart, Mel Turner (co-producers)	Netflix	
2025 (4th)	Time Bandits	Garrett Basch, Jemaine Clement, Tim Coddington, Iain Morris, Jane Stanton, Taika Waititi (executive producers); Akilah Green (producer); Sam Bain, Rich Blomquist, Dan Halsted (consulting producers)	Apple TV+	

== Programs with multiple nominations ==
3 nominations

- Heartstopper

2 nominations

- Goosebumps
- High School Musical: The Musical: The Series
- The Mysterious Benedict Society

== Networks with multiple nominations ==
10 nominations

- Disney+

6 nominations

- Netflix

2 nominations

- Apple TV+
