= Children's and Family Emmy Award for Outstanding Preschool Series =

Award for Outstanding Preschool Series

- Awarded for: Outstanding Preschool Series
- Country: United States
- Presented by: Academy of Television Arts & Sciences
- First award: 2022-2024
- Currently held by: Blue's Clues & You! (2024)
- Website: theemmys.tv/childrens/

This is a list of winners and nominees of the Children's and Family Emmy Award for Outstanding Preschool Series, which honors live action programs both in broadcast and streaming television aimed at young viewers from infancy through to age five. The category was established at the 1st Children's and Family Emmy Awards in 2022 and is a sister category to the Children's and Family Emmy Award for Outstanding Young Teen Series and the Children's and Family Emmy Award for Outstanding Children's or Family Viewing Series, which target shows aimed at older audiences.

The inaugural winner of the award was Sesame Street, which also leads in overall nominations, with three. It is followed by Blue's Clues & You! and Waffles + Mochi which each have two nominations respectively.

Due to a consistent lack of submissions since its inception, the category was discontinued after the 3rd Children's and Family Emmy Awards. It has been merged with the Outstanding Children's or Family Viewing Series category as of the 2026 ceremony.

== Background ==
On November 17, 2021, the NATAS announced the creation of the Children's and Family Emmy Awards to recognize the best in children's and family television. The organization cited an "explosive growth in the quantity and quality of children’s and family programming" as justification for a dedicated ceremony. Many categories of the awards were previously presented at the Daytime Emmy Awards. Programming aimed towards children and young adults was honored from 1974 to 2021 with the Daytime Emmy Award for Outstanding Children's Series, which was presented under various names across its lifespan, and the Primetime Emmy Award for Outstanding Children's Program, which was presented from 1950 to 2020. Following the establishment of the Children's and Family Emmy Awards, both categories were discontinued.

== Winners and nominations ==
=== 2020s ===
Year	Series	Network	Refs
2022 (1st)
2022 (1st)	Sesame Street	HBO Max	
2022 (1st)	Helpsters	Apple TV+	
2022 (1st)	The Not-Too-Late Show with Elmo	HBO Max	
2022 (1st)	Tab Time	YouTube Originals	
2022 (1st)	Waffles + Mochi	Netflix	
2023 (2nd)
2023 (2nd)	Sesame Street	HBO Max	
2023 (2nd)	Blue's Clues & You!	Nickelodeon	
2023 (2nd)	Helpsters	Apple TV+	
2023 (2nd)	Slumberkins	Apple TV+	
2023 (2nd)	Waffles + Mochi's Restaurant	Netflix	
2024 (3rd)
2024 (3rd)	Blue's Clues & You!	Nickelodeon	
2024 (3rd)	Donkey Hodie	PBS Kids	
2024 (3rd)	Lovely Little Farm	Apple TV+	
2024 (3rd)	Sesame Street	HBO Max	

== Programs with multiple awards ==
2 awards

- Sesame Street

== Shows with multiple nominations ==
3 nominations

- Sesame Street

2 nominations

- Blue's Clues & You!
- Helpsters
- Waffles + Mochi
- Tab Time

== Networks with multiple nominations ==
5 nominations

- Apple TV+
- HBO Max

2 nominations

- Netflix
- Nickelodeon
