= Children's and Family Emmy Award for Outstanding Preschool, Children's or Family Viewing Series =

Award for Outstanding Children's or Family Viewing Series

- Awarded for: Outstanding Young Teen Series
- Country: United States
- Presented by: Academy of Television Arts & Sciences
- First award: 2022
- Currently held by: Sesame Street (2025)
- Website: theemmys.tv/childrens/

This is a list of winners and nominees of the Children's and Family Emmy Award for Outstanding Preschool, Children's or Family Series, which honors live action programs both in broadcast and streaming television for viewers from infancy to age eleven and their families. The category was established at the 1st Children's and Family Emmy Awards in 2022 and is a sister category to the Children's and Family Emmy Award for Outstanding Young Teen Series, which targets older children.

The current holder of the award is the HBO Max educational Sesame Street, which won at the 4th Children's and Family Emmy Awards.

== Background ==
On November 17, 2021, the NATAS announced the creation of the Children's and Family Emmy Awards to recognize the best in children's and family television. The organization cited an "explosive growth in the quantity and quality of children’s and family programming" as justification for a dedicated ceremony. Many categories of the awards were previously presented at the Daytime Emmy Awards. Programming aimed towards children and young adults was honored from 1974 to 2021 with the Daytime Emmy Award for Outstanding Children's Series, which was presented under various names across its lifespan, and the Primetime Emmy Award for Outstanding Children's Program, which was presented from 1950 to 2020. Following the establishment of the Children's and Family Emmy Awards, both categories were discontinued.

From 2022 to 2025, the category was known as Children's and Family Emmy Award for Outstanding Children's or Family Viewing Series. As of the 4th Children's and Family Emmy Awards in 2026, the Outstanding Preschool Series category was discontinued and merged into this one, giving the category its current name.

== Winners and nominations ==
=== 2020s ===
Year	Series	Producers	Network
2022 (1st)
2022 (1st)	The Baby-Sitters Club	Lucia Aniello, Naia Cucukov, Michael De Luca, Benjamin Forrer, Lucy Kitada, Sascha Rothchild, Rachel Shukert, Frank Smith (executive producers); Ryan O'Connell (supervising producer); Matthew Chipera, Ashley Glazier, Ann M. Martin (producers)	Netflix
2022 (1st)	The Astronauts	Brian Grazer, Ron Howard, Dean Israelite, Daniel Knauf, Stephanie Sperber (executive producers); May Chan, Johnny Richardson (co-executive producers); Jim O'Grady (producer)	Nickelodeon
2022 (1st)	Fraggle Rock: Back to the Rock	Alex Cuthbertson, Matt Fusfeld, Lisa Henson, Arnon Milchan, Yariv Milchan, Halle Stanford, John Tartaglia (executive producers); Dave Goelz, Karen Prell (co-executive producers); Ritamarie Peruggi (producer); Leslie Cowan (line producer)	Apple TV+
2022 (1st)	Raising Dion	Carol Barbee, Marta Fernandez, Kenny Goodman, Darren Grant, Michael Green, Poppy Hanks, Michael B. Jordan, Charles D. King, Dennis Liu (executive producer); Leigh Dana Jackson (co-executive producer); Tanya Barfield, Ryan Mottesheard, Edward Ricourt (supervising producers); Juanita Diana Feeney, Montez A. Monroe (producers)	Netflix
2022 (1st)	Secrets of Sulphur Springs	R. Lee Fleming Jr., Charles Pratt Jr., Tracey Thomson (executive producers); Skot Bright (producer)	Disney Channel
2023 (2nd)
2023 (2nd)	The Muppets Mayhem	Bill Barretta, Adam F. Goldberg, Jeff Yorkes (co-creators/executive producers); Michael Bostick, Kris Eber, David Lightbody, Leigh Slaughter (executive producers); Julie Bean, Hannah Friedman (co-executive producers); Michael Steinbach (producer)	Disney+
2023 (2nd)	Are You Afraid of the Dark?	JT Billings, Chris Foss, Dean Israelite, Ned Kandel, Matt Kaplan, D. J. MacHale (executive producers); Paul Kim (co-executive producer); Petros Danabassis (line producer)	Nickelodeon
2023 (2nd)	Best Foot Forward	Matt Fleckenstein, Meghan Mathes Jacobs, Joel S. Rice, Josh Sundquist (executive producers); Eric Goldberg, Pete Tibbals (co-executive producers); Bernadette Luckett (producer); Zach Anner, Gillian Grassie (co-producers); Deb Spidell (line producer)	Apple TV+
2023 (2nd)	Jane	J. J. Johnson, Blair Powers, Christin Simms, Andria Teather (executive producers); Matthew J.R. Bishop (VFX/Animation executive producer); Sari Friedland, Teresa M. Ho, Tiffany Hsiung (producers)	Apple TV+
2023 (2nd)	Malory Towers	Angela Boudreault, Amy Buscombe, Alison Davis, Andra Johnson Duke, Michael Dunn, Rachel Flowerday, Sasha Hails, Karen Lawler, Anne Loi, Jo Sargent, Josh Scherba, Yvonne Sellins (executive producers); Daniel Bourré, David Collier, Luke Johnson, Bruce McDonald, Wendy Thomas (producers), Matt Winlow (associate producer); Steven Ross, Thomas Vencelides (line producers)	BYU TV
2024 (3rd)
2024 (3rd)	Fraggle Rock: Back to the Rock	Alex Cuthbertson, Matt Fusfeld, Lisa Henson, Arnon Milchan, Yariv Milchan, Halle Stanford, John Tartaglia (executive producers); Dave Goelz, Karen Prell (co-executive producers); Chris Plourde (producer); Tim O'Brien (co-producer)	Apple TV+
2024 (3rd)	La Fuerza de Creer: Dulce Sazón	Michelle López, Teri Arvesu, Alexandra Barrera, Carlos Collazo, Joy Lorenzo, Jessica Mercer, Anthony Tassi (executive producers); Charlie Cartaya (supervising producer); Rafael Rodriguez (senior producer); Maui Parada (coordinating producer); Mónica Mola (producer)	Univision
2024 (3rd)	Jane	Blair Powers, Matthew J.R. Bishop, J.J. Johnson, Christin Simms, Andria Teather (executive producers); Sari Friedland, Tiffany Hsiung (producers)	Apple TV+
2024 (3rd)	Malory Towers	Angela Boudreault, Amy Buscombe, Andra Johnson Duke, Rachel Flowerday, Sasha Hails, Karen Lawler, Anne Loi, Jo Sargent, Josh Scherba, Yvonne Sellins, Jeff Simpson (executive producers); Daniel Bourré, David Collier, Luke Johnson, Bruce McDonald, Wendy Thomas (producers); Steven Ross (line producer); Matt Winlow (associate producer)	BYU TV
2024 (3rd)	Raven's Home	Jed Elinoff, Robin M. Henry, Anthony C. Hill, Raven Symoné, Scott Thomas (executive producers); Julie Tsutsui, Rick Williams (co-executive producers); Molly Haldeman (producer)	Disney Channel
2025 (4th)
2025 (4th)	Sesame Street	Sal Perez, Kay Wilson Stallings (executive producers); Ken Scarborough (co-executive producers); Mindy Fila, Karyn Leibovich, Stephanie Longardo, Autumn Zitani (senior producer); Andrew Moriarty (coordinating producer); Christina Bacigalupo, Michael J. Cargill, William D'Amico, Elena Sassano, Matt Vogel, Bryce-Loren Walker, Ashmou Etossi Younge (producers); Kelly Ferrara (associate producer); Aimee Blackton (senior line producer)	HBO Max
2025 (4th)	Jane	J.J. Johnson, Blair Powers, Christin Simms, Andria Teather (executive producers); Sari Friedland, Tiffany Hsiung (producers); Matthew J. R. Bishop (VFX/animation executive producer)	Apple TV+
2025 (4th)	Kids Baking Championship	John Bravakis, Stephen Kroopnick, Francesco Giuseppe Pace, Stu Schreiberg, Leslie Thomas (executive producers); Katie Kroopnick Goldstein (co-executive producer); Geraldine Belafsky (supervising producer); Devan Dror, Kathy Jackoway, Anna Kroopnick (producers); Kaitlin Graves (line producer)	Food Network
2025 (4th)	Ms. Rachel	Aron Accurso, Rachel Accurso, Jaime Burke, Amy Kim (executive producers); Kevin McShane (supervising producer); Ashley DeLeon, Matthew Mullen (co-ordinating producers); Reilly Buckley, Kristen McGregor, Beth Jean Olson (producers)	YouTube
2025 (4th)	Odd Squad	Matthew J.R. Bishop, Spencer Campbell, Aubrey Clarke, Mark De Angelis, Ellen Doherty, Tommy Gillespie, Kirsten Hurd, J. J. Johnson, Tim McKeon, Adam Peltzman, Blair Powers, Adriano Schmid, Carla de Jong (executive producers); Stephen J Turnbull (supervising producer); Lauren Huggins (producer)	PBS Kids
2025 (4th)	Tab Time	Jason Berger, Tabitha Brown, Summer Griffiths, Craig Hunter, Amy Laslett, Mark J. Marraccini, Sean Presant (executive producers)	YouTube

== Shows with multiple nominations ==
3 nominations

- Jane

2 nominations

- Fraggle Rock: Back to the Rock
- Malory Towers

== Networks with multiple nominations ==
6 nominations

- Apple TV+

3 nominations

- Disney+/Disney Channel

2 nominations

- BYU TV
- Netflix
- Nickelodeon
- YouTube
