= Slumberkins =

2022 American puppetry TV series

- Genre: Puppetry
- Created by: Alex Rockwell
- Based on: Slumberkins by Callie Christensen and Kelly Oriard
- Directed by: Collette Sunderman (voice director)
- Starring: Araceli Prasarttongosoth; Olive Baity; Miles Flack; Yonas Kibreab; Brayden Morgan
- Narrated by: Jennifer Hale
- Opening theme: "Slumberkins Theme Song" performed by Ingrid Michaelson
- Composer: Sunna Wehrmeijer
- Countries of origin: United States; United Kingdom
- Original language: English
- No. of seasons: 1
- No. of episodes: 8

Production
- Executive producers: Halle Stanford; Alex Rockwell; Phil Chalk
- Running time: 21–22 minutes (11–12 minutes per episode)
- Production companies: The Jim Henson Company; Factory

Original release
- Network: Apple TV+
- Release: November 4, 2022

Slumberkins is a puppetry television series that was released on November 4, 2022 on Apple TV+.

A second season will be released on Apple TV on February 5, 2027.

== Premise ==
Based on the leading children's emotional learning brand, Slumberkins brings to life characters from the beloved books while empowering the emotional wellness of children through supportive storytelling. Embark on adventures with Yak, Unicorn, Sloth, Fox, and Bigfoot as they explore a world of feelings.

== Characters ==
=== Main characters ===
- Yak (performed by Alice Dinnean, voiced by Araceli Prasarttongosoth)
- Unicorn (performed by Donna Kimball, voiced by Olive Baity)
- Sloth (performed by James Godwin, voiced by Miles Flack)
- Fox (performed by Russ Walko, voiced by Yonas Kibreab)
- Bigfoot (performed by Victor Yerrid, voiced by Brayden Morgan)
- Narrator (voiced by Jennifer Hale)

=== Recurring characters ===
- Fox's Father (performed by Victor Yerrid, voiced by Jason Ritter)
- Fox's Mother (performed by Alice Dinnean and Aymee Garcia, voiced by Pamela Adlon)
- Kit (performed by Aymee Garcia, voiced by Adelynn Spoon)
- Yak's Mother (performed by Amanda Maddock, voiced by Yvette Nicole Brown)
- Yak's Father (performed by Russ Walko, voiced by Yuri Lowenthal)
- Bigfoot's Father (performed by Amanda Maddock, voiced by Peter Linz)
- Sloth's Mother (performed by Donna Kimball, voiced by Alice Braga)
- Unicorn's Mother (performed by Donna Kimball and Aymee Garcia, voiced by Laura Coyle)
- Unicorn's Grandmother (performed by Aymee Garcia, voiced by Jennifer Hale)
- Squirrels (voiced by Dee Bradley Baker, Miles Flack, Yonas Kibreab, and Kari Wahlgren)

== Episodes ==
=== Season 1 (2022) ===
No.	Title	Directed by	Written by	Original release date
1	"Yak the Amazing Juggler"	Kristen McGregor, Seamus Walsh, and Michael Shawn Lewis	Bar Ben-Yossef, Matthew Galvan, and Alex Rockwell	November 4, 2022
1	"Keep on Running"	Kristen McGregor, Seamus Walsh, and Michael Shawn Lewis	Bar Ben-Yossef, Matthew Galvan, and Alex Rockwell	November 4, 2022
Yak discovers an exciting talent but feels overshadowed by her new siblings. Fox attempts to hide his tears after getting hurt.
2	"Sunny Day Cupcakes"	Jason deVilliers and Michael Shawn Lewis	Bar Ben-Yossef and Peter Limm	November 4, 2022
2	"It's Great to Be a Bigfoot"	Jason deVilliers and Michael Shawn Lewis	Bar Ben-Yossef and Peter Limm	November 4, 2022
Sloth and Yak enjoy fun in the kitchen until a mishap leads to conflicting emotions. Bigfoot's self-esteem is tested after he gets teased.
3	"Unicorn's Box of Big Ideas"	Jason deVilliers	Jeff D'Elia and Bar Ben-Yossef	November 4, 2022
3	"Bigfoot's Family Ukulele"	Jason deVilliers	Jeff D'Elia and Bar Ben-Yossef	November 4, 2022
Bigfoot and Fox accidentally hurt Unicorn's feelings during a play date. Bigfoot makes a mistake and learns about unconditional love.
4	"Super Speedy Spin Cone"	John Tartaglia	Noëlle Lara and Bar Ben-Yossef	November 4, 2022
4	"Special Collection"	John Tartaglia	Noëlle Lara and Bar Ben-Yossef	November 4, 2022
Fox struggles when his friends play with a toy he doesn't have. Sloth loves to give Unicorn gifts but worries it's the only reason they are friends.
5	"When You Gotta Go"	Mark Caballero and Jason deVilliers	Bar Ben-Yossef and Ryan Toyama	November 4, 2022
5	"Let's Go Fix a Kite"	Mark Caballero and Jason deVilliers	Bar Ben-Yossef and Ryan Toyama	November 4, 2022
Bigfoot feels anxious over a bathroom emergency. Sloth and Fox have their first big fight and must repair their friendship.
6	"When Things Change"	John Tartaglia	Bar Ben-Yossef and Alex Rockwell	November 4, 2022
6	"Bigfoot's First Sleepover"	John Tartaglia	Bar Ben-Yossef and Alex Rockwell	November 4, 2022
Fox has a hard time with change when his family moves to a new home. Bigfoot has his first sleepover with Fox but misses his dad at bedtime.
7	"Yak's Perfect Day"	Jason deVilliers	Bar Ben-Yossef	November 4, 2022
7	"Imagine Myself to Sleep"	Jason deVilliers	Bar Ben-Yossef	November 4, 2022
Yak tries to have the best day ever, but nothing seems to go her way. Sloth is afraid of the dark when he imagines shadows coming to life.
8	"Bug-a-Pest Hotel"	Kristen McGregor	Jeff D'Elia, Ryan Toyama, and Bar Ben-Yossef	November 4, 2022
8	"The Grass Is Greener at Bigfoot's"	Kristen McGregor	Jeff D'Elia, Ryan Toyama, and Bar Ben-Yossef	November 4, 2022
Unicorn feels left out of her friendship with Yak and Fox. Yak compares her home to Bigfoot's and worries it's too noisy and messy.

== Release ==
Slumberkins was released on November 4, 2022 on Apple TV.

== Accolades ==
Slumberkins was nominated for Outstanding Preschool Series at the 2nd Children's and Family Emmy Awards.
