= 2nd Children's and Family Emmy Awards =

- Date: December 16–17, 2023
- Location: Westin Bonaventure Hotel, Los Angeles
- Presented by: National Academy of Television Arts and Sciences
- Hosted by: Christopher Jackson

Highlights
- Most awards: Lost Ollie, Moon Girl and Devil Dinosaur and Sesame Street (5)
- Most nominations: Sesame Street (12)
- Outstanding Preschool Series: Sesame Street
- Outstanding Children's or Family Viewing Series: The Muppets Mayhem
- Outstanding Young Teen Series: The Crossover

The 2nd Children's and Family Emmy Awards were presented by the National Academy of Television Arts and Sciences (NATAS), to honor the best in American children's and family-oriented television programming in 2022 and 2023, following on from the inaugural ceremony held a year prior. The eligibility period ran from June 1, 2022, to May 31, 2023, mirroring that of the Primetime Emmy Awards.

The winners were announced during two ceremonies, one focused on creative and technical arts, and the other dedicated to performances and programming, on December 16 and 17, 2023 at the Westin Bonaventure Hotel in Los Angeles. with the latter night being hosted by Christopher Jackson. Nominations were revealed on November 2, 2023, with Sesame Street leading with twelve nominations, followed by Sweet Tooth with eleven.

The second annual Lifetime Achievement Award was presented to voice actor Peter Cullen.

== Background ==
For the 2023 ceremony, the NATAS announced several changes for different categories and eligibility rules:

- Three new categories – Outstanding Public Service Initiative, Outstanding Puppeteer Performance and Outstanding Puppet Design/Styling, were introduced.
- Two categories were removed:
  - Outstanding Guest Performer - these performers are now eligible to compete in the Supporting category.
  - Outstanding Special Effects Costumes, Makeup and Hairstyling - these "specialty looks" are now eligible to be featured as part of the reels for the Outstanding Costume Design/Styling and/or the Outstanding Hairstyling and Makeup categories.
- The Outstanding Original Song has been split into two separate categories (Outstanding Original Song for a Preschool Program and Outstanding Original Song for a Children's and Young Teen Program).
- The Outstanding Cinematography for a Live Action Single-Camera Program and Outstanding Cinematography for a Live Action Multiple-Camera Program categories will now only award the cinematographer and/or director of photography.
- Outstanding Lighting Design for a Live Action Program has been renamed Outstanding Lighting, Camera and Technical Arts and will now honor series, specials and variety shows with technical production teams.

== Winners and nominees ==
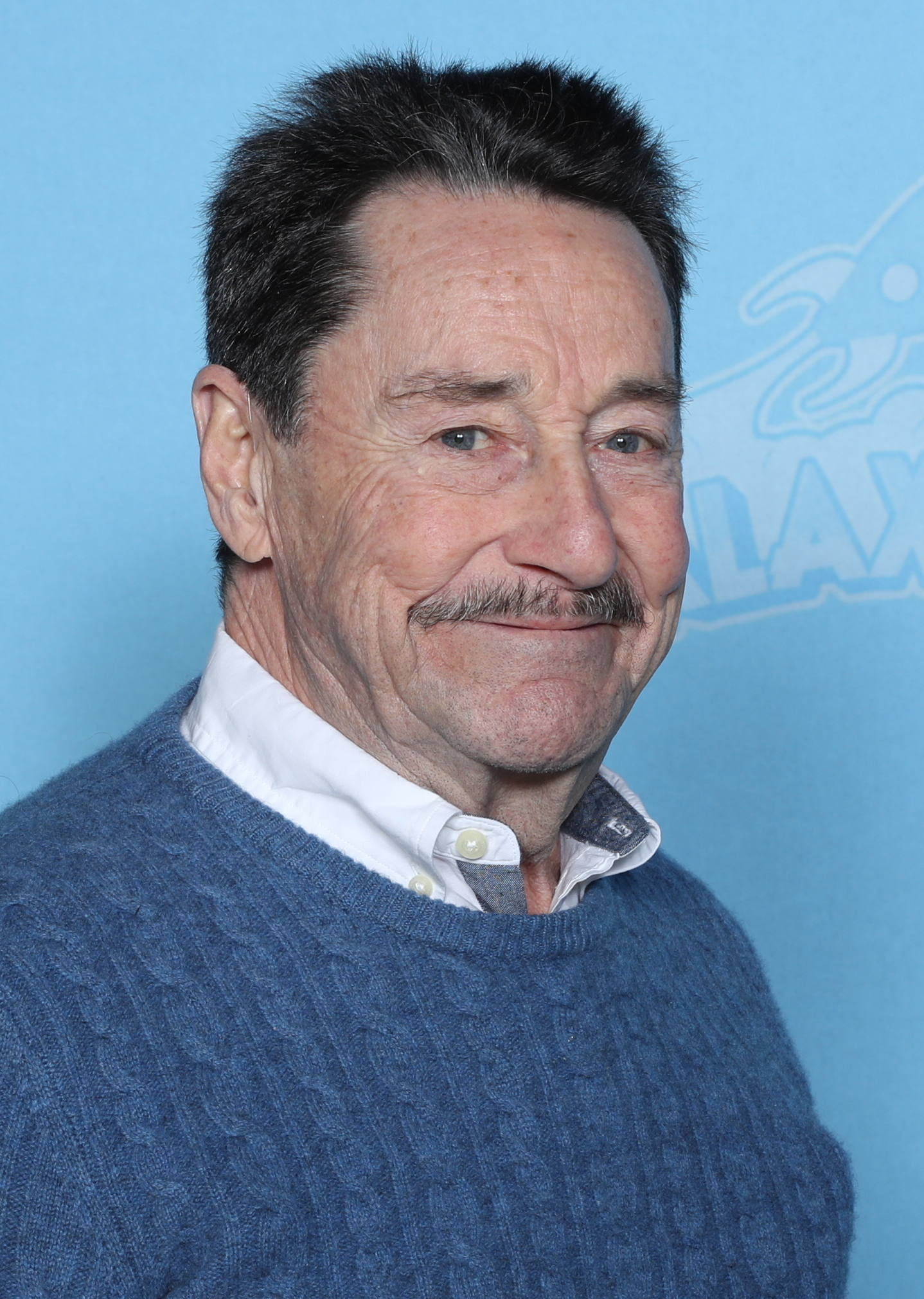
Peter Cullen, Lifetime Achievement Award recipient

Nominations were set to be announced on the week of October 17, 2023, but were postponed due to the 2023 SAG-AFTRA strike. The nominees were ultimately announced on November 2, 2023.

=== Programming ===
Programming
Outstanding Preschool Series: Sesame Street (HBO Max/PBS Kids); Blue's Clues & You! (Nickelodeon); Helpsters (Apple TV+); Slumberkins (Apple TV+); Waffles + Mochi's Restaurant (Netflix)	Outstanding Children's or Family Viewing Series: The Muppets Mayhem (Disney+); Are You Afraid of the Dark? (Nickelodeon); Best Foot Forward (Apple TV+); Jane (Apple TV+); Malory Towers (BYUtv)
Outstanding Young Teen Series: The Crossover (Disney+); Ghostwriter (Apple TV+); High School Musical: The Musical: The Series (Disney+); The Mysterious Benedict Society (Disney+); XO, Kitty (Netflix)	Outstanding Fiction Special: The Guardians of the Galaxy Holiday Special (Disney+); Chang Can Dunk (Disney+); Fraggle Rock: Back to the Rock: “Night of the Lights” (Apple TV+); Ivy and Bean: Doomed to Dance (Netflix); Prom Pact (Disney Channel)
Outstanding Non-Fiction Program: 1000% Me: Growing Up Mixed (HBO); All-Round Champion (BYUtv); Mamas (The Roku Channel); NBC Nightly News: Kids Edition (NBC); Nick News (Nickelodeon)	Outstanding Preschool Animated Series: StoryBots: Answer Time (Netflix); The Adventures of Paddington (Nick Jr.); Spirit Rangers (Netflix); Star Wars: Young Jedi Adventures (Disney+); The Tiny Chef Show (Nickelodeon)
Outstanding Children's or Young Teen Animated Series: Zootopia+ (Disney+); Baymax! (Disney+); Big City Greens (Disney Channel); Moon Girl and Devil Dinosaur (Disney Channel); ONI: Thunder God's Tale (Netflix)	Outstanding Animated Special: Moon Girl and Devil Dinosaur: "Moon Girl Landing" (Disney Channel); Looney Tunes Cartoons: "Bugs Bunny's Howl-O-Skreem Spooktacular" (HBO Max); Reindeer in Here (CBS); Rise of the Teenage Mutant Ninja Turtles: The Movie (Netflix); Snoopy Presents: Lucy's School (Apple TV+); The Wonderful Summer of Mickey Mouse (Disney+)
Outstanding Short Form Program: I Am Groot (Disney+); The Big Gathering (PBS Kids); Sesame Street: Wes' First Barbershop Haircut (YouTube); Sesame Street's #ComingTogether Word of the Day Series (YouTube); Storyline Online (YouTube)	Outstanding Promotional Announcement: Nickelodeon Brand Campaign: "Quartet," "Car," "We Make Fun" (Nickelodeon); Jurassic World: Camp Cretaceous: "Season 5 Campaign" (Netflix); PBS Kids: “Brand IDs” (PBS Kids)
Outstanding Interactive Media: Galactic Catch (Baobab Studios); Alma's Way: Boom Boom Bah! (PBS Kids); Mission US: No Turning Back (Thirteen); Molly of Denali: The Big Gathering Game (PBS Kids); Momoguro: Legends of Uno (Baobab Studios); Out-Of-The-Box Science With Dr. Jeff (Generation Genius); Snacks with Spats (Noggin)	Outstanding Public Initiative: Gabby's Kid Power Challenge (YouTube); Honorable Mention: Sesame Street: Quest for Health Equity (YouTube)

=== Performances ===
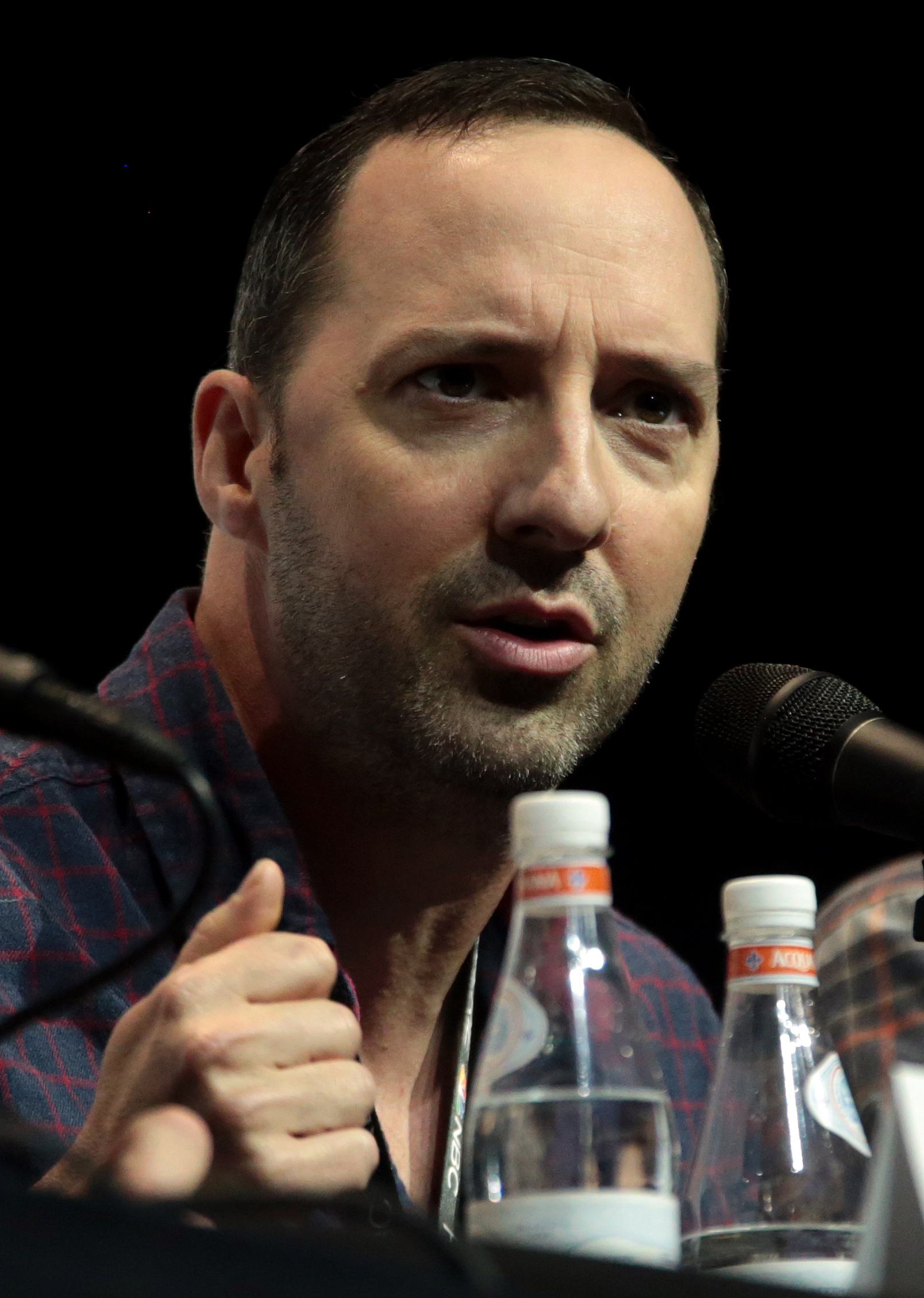
Tony Hale, Outstanding Lead Performance in a Preschool, Children's or Young Teen Program winner

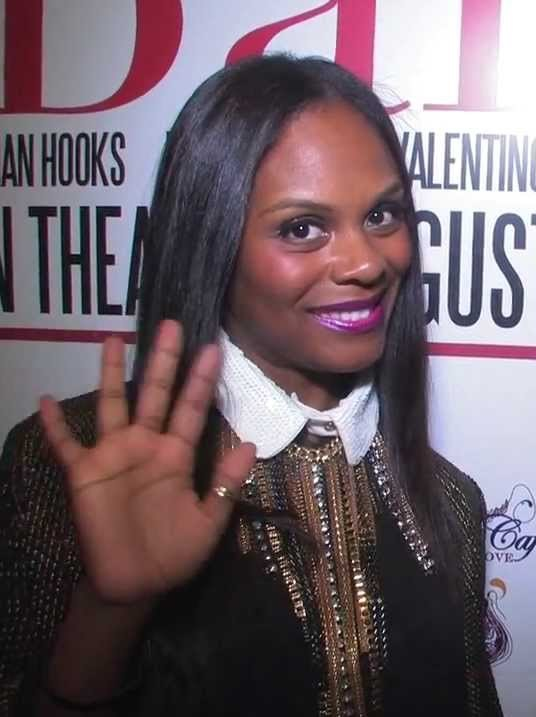
Tabitha Brown, Outstanding Host winner

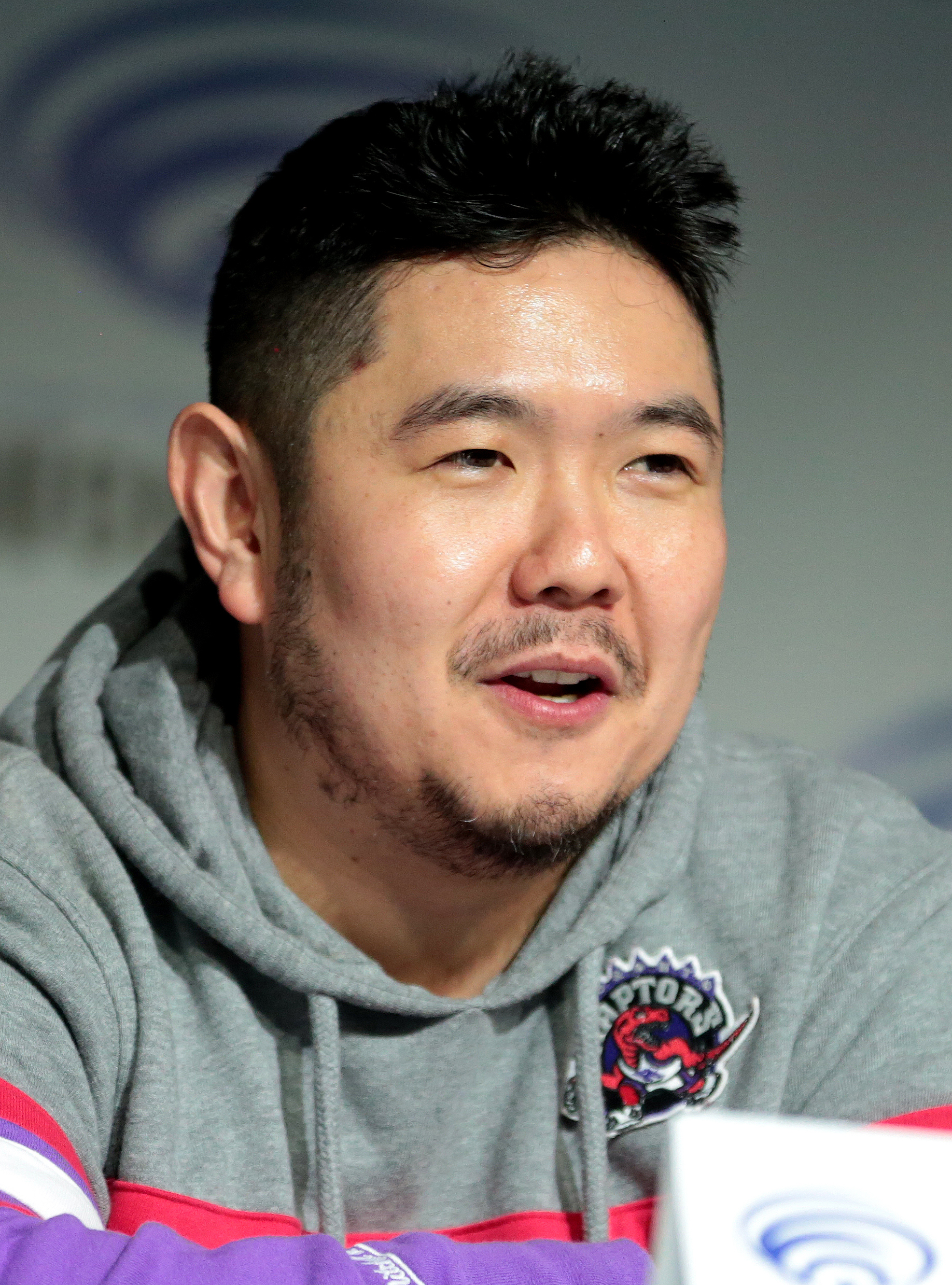
Eric Bauza, Outstanding Voice Performance in a Preschool Animated Program winner

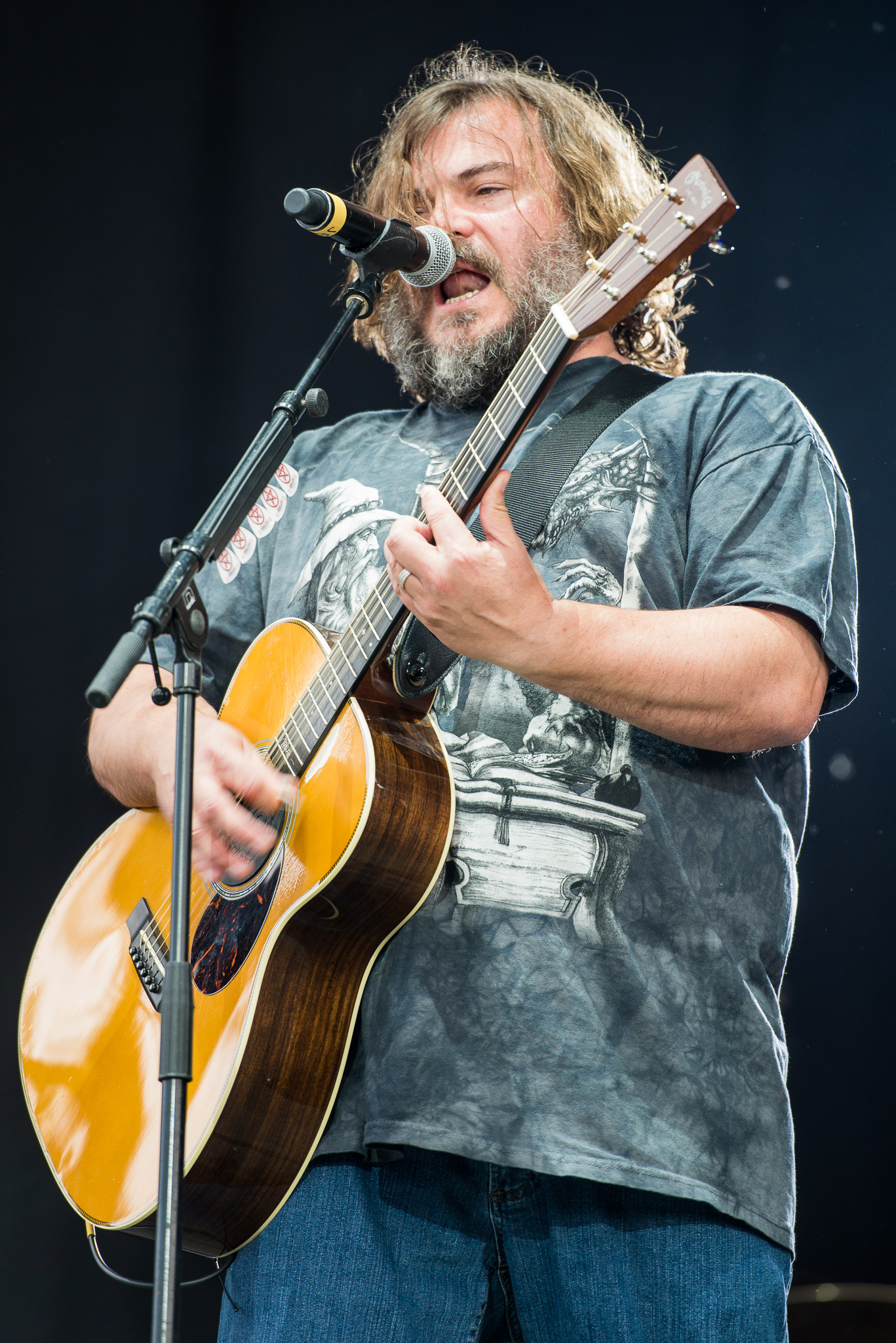
Jack Black, Outstanding Voice Performance in an Animated Program winner

Performer
Outstanding Lead Performance in a Preschool, Children's or Young Teen Program: Tony Hale as Mr. Benedict on The Mysterious Benedict Society (Disney+); Tim Allen as Scott Calvin/Santa on The Santa Clauses (Disney+); Ella Bright as Darrell Rivers on Malory Towers (BYUtv); Veda Cienfuegos as Emily on Circuit Breakers (Apple TV+); Gina Rodriguez as Momma on Lost Ollie (Netflix)	Outstanding Supporting Performance in a Preschool, Children's or Young Teen Program: Adeel Akhtar as Dr. Aditya Singh on Sweet Tooth (Netflix); Nonso Anozie as Tommy Jepperd on Sweet Tooth (Netflix); Kal Penn as Simon Choksi/Santa on The Santa Clauses (Disney+); Neil Sandilands as General Abbot on Sweet Tooth (Netflix); Catherine Zeta-Jones as Billie Pearce on National Treasure: Edge of History (Disney+)
Outstanding Younger Performer in a Preschool, Children's or Young Teen Program: Mykal-Michelle Harris as Alice Baxter on Raven's Home (Disney Channel); Marta Kessler as Constance Contraire on The Mysterious Benedict Society (Disney+); Matilda Lawler as Betty on The Santa Clauses (Disney+); Rupali Redd as Grace on The Santa Clauses (Disney+)	Outstanding Host: Tabitha Brown – Tab Time (YouTube Originals); Valerie Bertinelli & Duff Goldman – Kids Baking Championship (Food Network); Emmanuel Carter – Noggin Knows (Noggin); Taylor Cassidy, Benjamin De Almeida, Kahlil Greene, Tejas Hullur, Jane McManus & Jillian Smith – Nick News (Nickelodeon); Juanpa Zurita – Elmo’s Mindfulness Spectacular! (YouTube)
Outstanding Voice Performance in a Preschool Program: Eric Bauza as Bugs Bunny, Daffy Duck, Tweety Bird & Marvin the Martian on Bugs Bunny Builders (Cartoon Network); Erin Fitzgerald as Bo, Eleanor Smartypants, Story StoryBerg, Ranger Dot, Oog the CaveBot & Fun Fact Hairdresser on StoryBots: Answer Time (Netflix); James Monroe Iglehart as Mr. Puppypaws/Announcer on SuperKitties (Disney Junior); Cree Summer as Lizard & DeeDee on Spirit Rangers (Netflix); Fred Tatasciore as Bang, BlimBlam the Barbarian & Chef Pierre on StoryBots: Answer Time (Netflix)	Outstanding Voice Performance in a Children's or Young Teen Program: Jack Black as Po, Kung Fu Panda: The Dragon Knight (Netflix); Bob Bergen as Porky Pig, Looney Tunes Cartoons (HBO Max); Laurence Fishburne as The Beyonder on Moon Girl and Devil Dinosaur (Disney Channel); Tom Kenny as SpongeBob SquarePants on SpongeBob SquarePants (Nickelodeon); Rob Paulsen as Pinky, Dr. Scratchansniff & Yakko on Animaniacs (Hulu)
Outstanding Younger Voice Performer in an Animated or Preschool Animated Program: Maria Nash as Pinecone on Pinecone & Pony (Apple TV+); Talon Proc Alford as Eddy Skycedar on Spirit Rangers (Netflix); Juliet Donenfeld as Piper on Interrupting Chicken (Apple TV+); Melissa Povenmire as Gretel on Hamster & Gretel (Disney Channel); Isis Celilo Rogers as Summer Skycedar on Spirit Rangers (Netflix); Momona Tamada as Onari on ONI: Thunder God’s Tale (Netflix)	Outstanding Puppeteer Performance: Ryan Dillon as Elmo on Sesame Street (HBO Max); Leslie Carrara-Rudolph as Abby & Tango on Sesame Street (HBO Max); Frankie Cordero as Purple Panda, Penguin Referee & Gregory on Donkey Hodie (PBS Kids); Haley Jenkins as Donkey Hodie on Donkey Hodie (PBS Kids); Eric Jacobson as Bert, Oscar & Grover on Sesame Street (HBO Max); Eric Jacobson as Animal/Baby Animal on The Muppets Mayhem (Disney+)

=== Writing ===
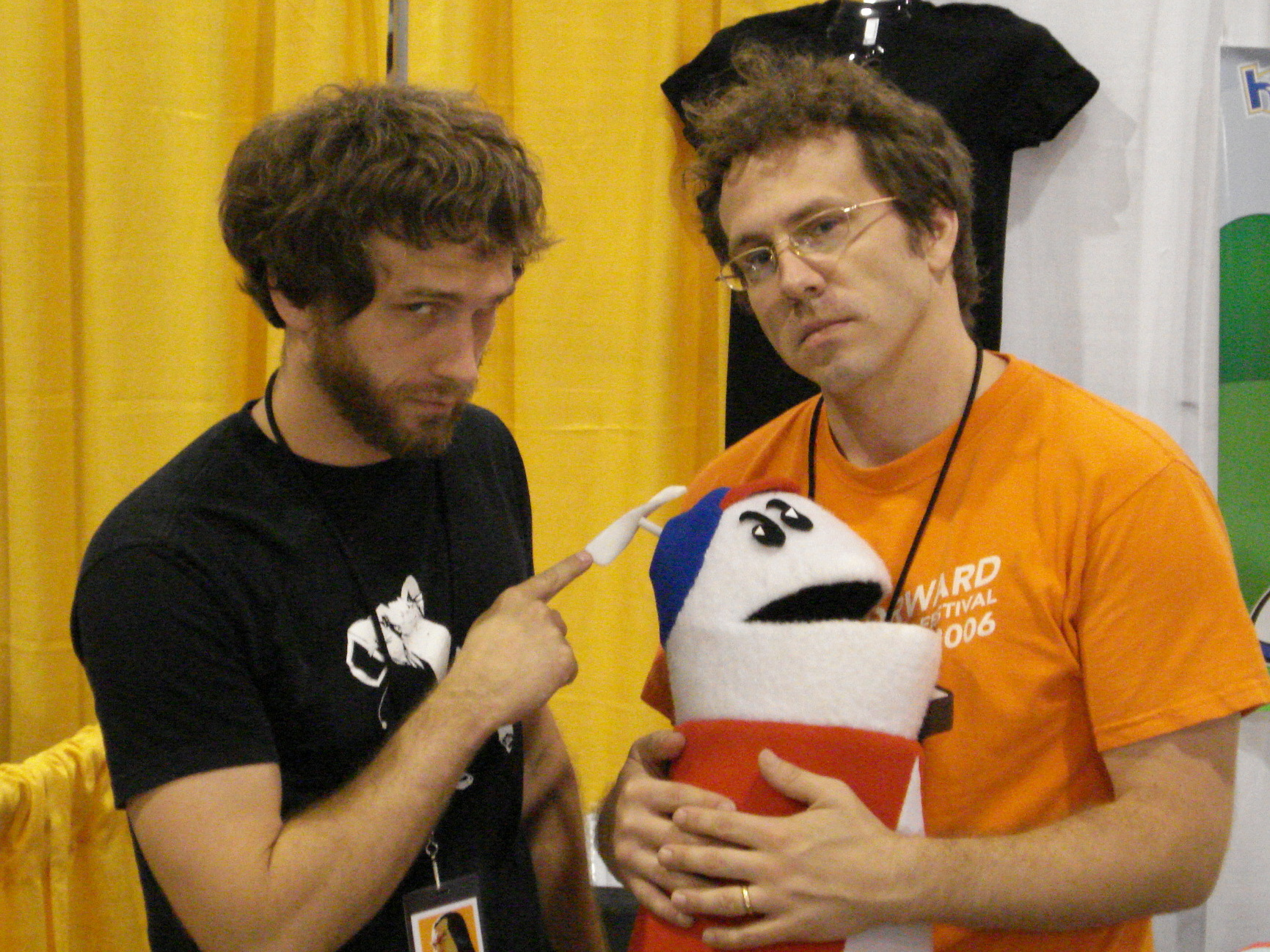
Matt and Mike Chapman (The Brothers Chaps), Outstanding Writing for a Preschool Animated Program co-winners

Writing
Outstanding Writing for a Preschool or Children's Program: Sesame Street – Ken Scarborough, Belinda Arredondo, Molly Boylan, Jessica Carleton, Geri Cole, Joe Fallon, Christine Ferraro, Monique D. Hall, Liz Hara, Ron Holsey, Raye Lankford (HBO Max); Helpsters – Adam Peltzman, Marty Johnson, Tim McKeon, Roxy Simons, Eric Toth, Moujan Zolfaghari (Apple TV+); Jane – J.J. Johnson, Christin Simms, Tiffany Hsiung (Apple TV+); Lost Ollie – Shannon Tindle, Joanna Calo, Marc Haimes, Kate Gersten (Netflix); Raven’s Home – Jed Elinoff, Robin Henry, Anthony C. Hill, Scott Thomas, Rick Williams, Molly Haldeman, Jim Martin, Brittany Assaly, Danielle Calvert, Jai Joseph, Nori Reid, Jordan Mitchell (Disney Channel)	Outstanding Writing for a Young Teen Program: Life by Ella – Jeff Hodsden, Tim Pollock, Vincent Brown, Susan Jaffee, Natalie McKearnin, Hernan Barangan, Alyssa DiMari (Apple TV+); Chang Can Dunk – Jingyi Shao (Disney+); The Crossover – Kwame Alexander, Damani Johnson, Valerie C. Woods, Ali Kinney, Aaron Carter, Jasmine Swift, Jake Lawler (Disney+); Growing Up – Travis Callahan, Nicole Galovski (Disney+); The Mysterious Benedict Society – Taylor Chukwu, Phil Hay, Heather Jeng Bladt, Matt Manfredi, Angeli Millan, James Rogers III, Todd Slavkin, Darren Swimmer (Disney+)
Outstanding Writing for a Preschool Animated Program: StoryBots: Answer Time – Edlyn Capulong, Matt Chapman, Mike Chapman, Scott Emmons, Jeff Gill, Chris Harding, Henock Lebsekal, Kendall Nelson, Evan Spiridellis, Gregg Spiridellis, Maha Tabikh, Nate Theis (Netflix); The Adventures of Paddington – Jon Foster, James Lamont (Nick Jr.); Daniel Tiger's Neighborhood – Jill Cozza-Turner, Saurin Choksi, Mary Jacobson, Haley Hoffman, Alexandra Cassel Schwartz, Sara Farber (PBS Kids); Interrupting Chicken – Ron Holsey, Scott Gray, Jennifer Keene, Josh Riley Brown (Apple TV+); Molly of Denali – Peter K. Hirsch, Peter Ferland, June Thiele, Vera Starbard (PBS Kids); The Tiny Chef Show – Jim Nolan, Rebecca Delgado, Ta'riq Fisher, Jordan Gershowitz, Sarah Jenkins, Sara Karimipour, Laura Kleinbaum, Rachel Larsen, Teresa Lee, Sarah Nerboso, Adam Reid, Alec Schwimmer (Nickelodeon)	Outstanding Writing for an Animated Program: Baymax! – Cirocco Dunlap (Disney+); Craig of the Creek – Matt Burnett, Ben Levin, Jeff Trammell, Dashawn Mahone, Najja Porter, Deena Beck, Ashleigh Hairston (Cartoon Network); Karma's World – Halcyon Person, Keion Jackson, Jehan Madhani (Netflix); Moon Girl and Devil Dinosaur – Lisa Muse Bryant, Jeffrey M. Howard, Kate Kondell, Liz Hara, Halima Lucas, Maggie Rose, Taylor Vaughn Lasley (Disney Channel); My Dad the Bounty Hunter – Everett Downing, Patrick Harpin, Eric Rivera, Shakira Pressley, Adele Williams, Justin Gordon-Montgomery (Netflix)

=== Directing ===
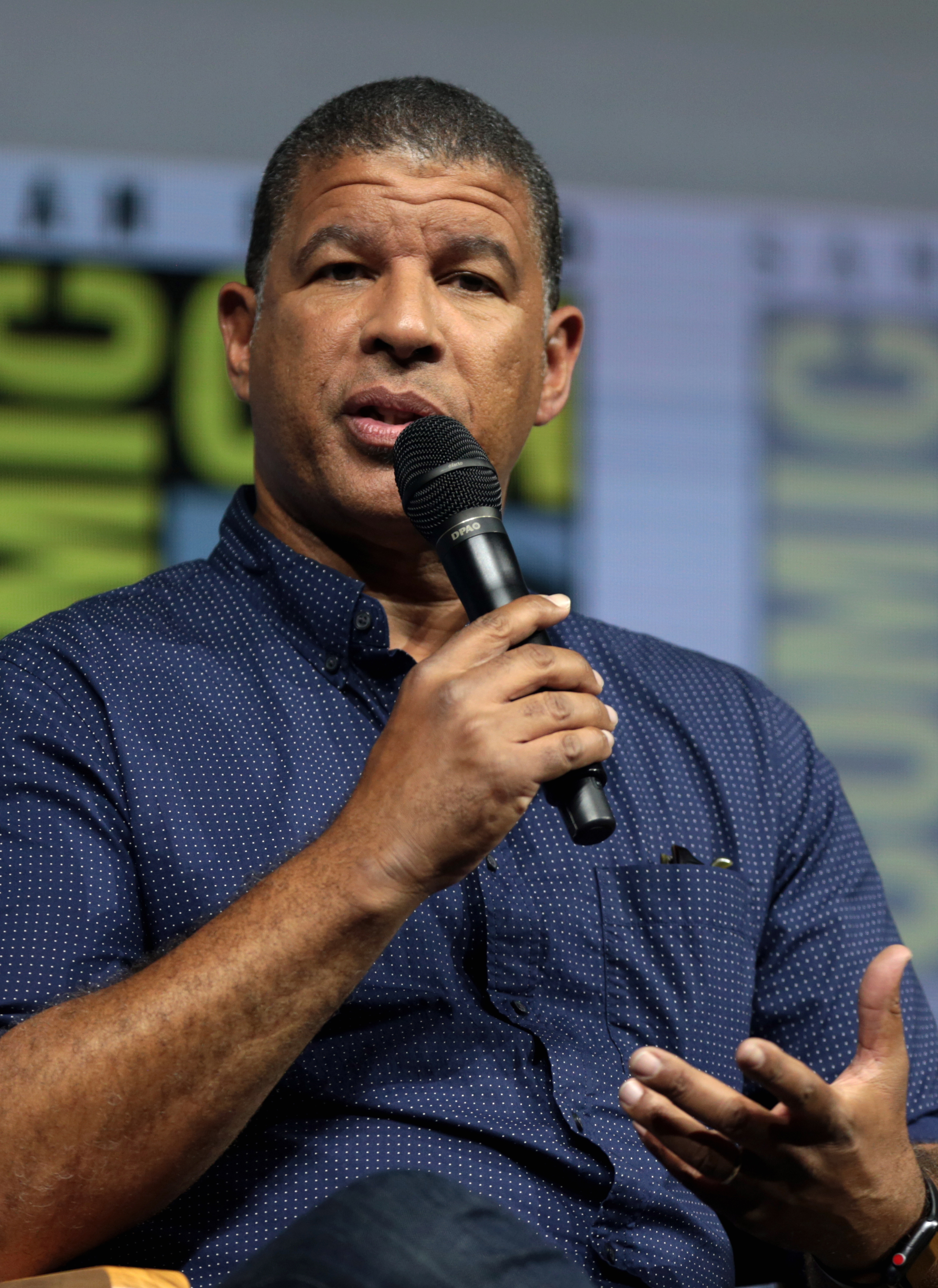
Peter Ramsey, Outstanding Directing for a Single Camera Program winner

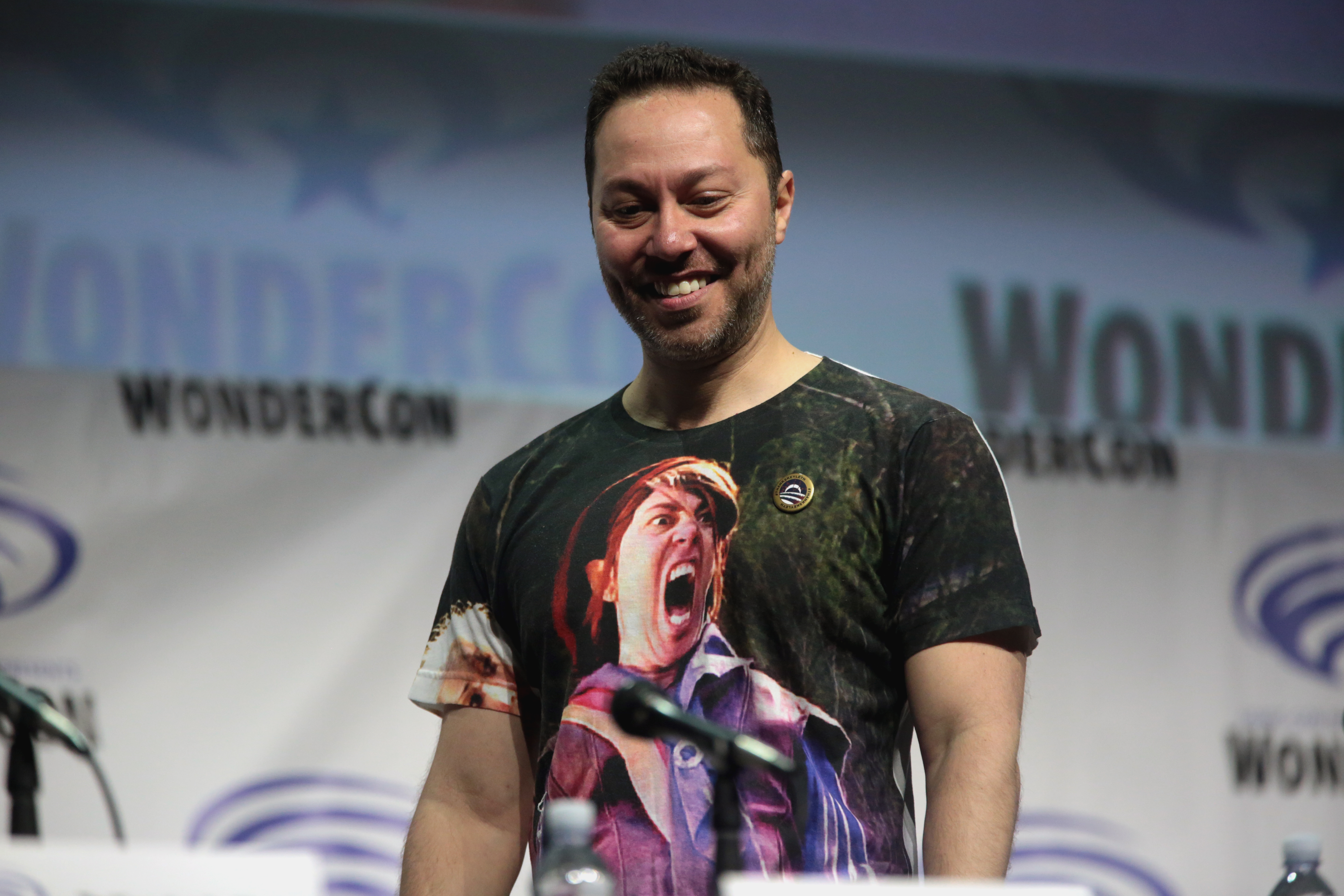
Sam Riegel, Outstanding Voice Directing for an Animated Series winner

Directing
Outstanding Directing for a Single Camera Program: Lost Ollie — Peter Ramsey (Netflix); Circuit Breakers — Annie Bradley, Romeo Candido, Matthew Hastings, Farhad Mann, Wendy Morgan (Apple TV+); The Guardians of the Galaxy Holiday Special — James Gunn (Disney+); The Muppets Mayhem — Robert Cohen, Kimmy Gatewood, Matt Sohn (Disney+); The Mysterious Benedict Society — Kabir Akhtar, James Bobin, Lena Khan, Tara Nicole Weyr, Dawn Wilkinson, April Winney, Craig Zisk (Disney+)	Outstanding Directing for a Multiple Camera Program: Sesame Street – Ken Diego, Shannon Flynn, Todd E. James, Jack Jameson, Benjamin Lehmann, Julie LoRusso, Noel MacNeal, Linda Mendoza, Alan Muraoka, Lily Olszewski, Scott Preston, Brittany Scott Smith, Matt Vogel (HBO Max); Hello, Jack! The Kindness Show – Leena Pendharkar, Brittany Scott Smith, Bridget Stokes (Apple TV+); Kids’ Choice Awards 2023 – Ryan Polito (Nickelodeon); Raven's Home – Raven-Symoné, Monica Marie Contreras, Robbie Countryman, Jade Jenise Dixon, Jed Elinoff, Morenike Joela Evans, Danielle Fishel, Leonard Garner Jr., Victor Gonzalez, Ian Jordan, Ian Reed Kessler and Lynda Tarryk (Disney Channel)
Outstanding Directing for a Preschool Animated Program: The Tiny Chef Show – Rachel Larsen, Chris Tichborne (Nickelodeon); Ada Twist, Scientist – Jean Herlihy, Adrian Ignat, Alan Moran, Seamus O'Toole, David McCamley, Amnon Schwarz, Rajiv Singate, Shobhit Trivedi (Netflix); The Adventures of Paddington – Chris Drew (Nick Jr.); Mickey Saves Christmas – David H. Brooks (Disney Channel); Spirit Rangers – Dorothée Robert (Netflix)	Outstanding Directing for an Animated Program: The Cuphead Show! – Clay Morrow, Adam Paloian (Netflix); Baymax! – Dean Wellins (Disney+); Kung Fu Panda: The Dragon Knight – David Dick, Mike Goguen, Will Ruzicka, Kevin Wotton, James Yang (Netflix); ONI: Thunder God’s Tale – Daisuke "Dice" Tsutsumi, Erick Oh, Hikari Toriumi (Netflix); Zootopia+ – Trent Correy, Josie Trinidad (Disney+)
Outstanding Voice Directing for an Animated Series: Moon Girl and Devil Dinosaur – Sam Riegel (Disney Channel); Ada Twist, Scientist – Ashley Nguyen DeWitt (Netflix); The Ghost and Molly McGee – Eden Riegel (Disney Channel); Kiff – Sam Riegel (Disney Channel); Spirit Rangers – Allyson Bosch (Netflix)

=== Animation ===
Individual Achievement in Animation
- Hamster & Gretel – Kyle Menke (Disney Channel)
- Moon Girl and Devil Dinosaur – Kaz Aiwaza (Disney Channel)
- ONI: Thunder God's Tale – Masa Inada (Netflix)
- ONI: Thunder God's Tale – Robert Kondo (Netflix)
- ONI: Thunder God's Tale – Lia Tin (Netflix)
- Rise of the Teenage Mutant Ninja Turtles: The Movie – Carl Anders Beu (Netflix)
- Shape Island – Ellen Coons (Apple TV+)
- Sonic Prime – Joey Pogoy (Netflix)
- Unicorn: Warriors Eternal – Stephen DeStefano (Adult Swim)

=== Art Direction ===
Art Direction
Outstanding Art Direction/Set Decoration/Scenic Design: The Mysterious Benedict Society (Disney+); The Guardians of the Galaxy Holiday Special (Disney+); Lost Ollie (Netflix); The Santa Clauses (Disney+); Sweet Tooth (Netflix)	Outstanding Puppet Design and Styling: Sesame Street (HBO Max); Donkey Hodie (PBS Kids); Fraggle Rock: Back to the Rock: "The Night of Lights" (Apple TV+); Helpsters (Apple TV+); The Muppets Mayhem (Disney+)

=== Casting ===
Casting
Outstanding Casting for a Live-Action Program: Best Foot Forward – Danielle Aufiero, Amber Horn, Steven Tylor O'Connor (Apple TV+); All-Round Champion – Candace Cobbing, Josh Tavares (BYUtv); High School Musical: The Musical: The Series – Julie Ashton, James Kim (Disney+); A Kind of Spark – Sue Needleman, Sophie Lyons (BYUtv); Monster High: The Movie – Sheryl Levine, Sarah Grace Johnson (Nickelodeon); The Muppets Mayhem – Collin Daniel, Brett Greenstein and Alexa Pereira (Disney+); Ultra Violet & Black Scorpion – Amelia Chen Miley, Elizabeth Coulon, Carla Hool, Susan Putnam, Marisa Freeman (Disney Channel)	Outstanding Casting for an Animated Program: Moon Girl and Devil Dinosaur – Tatiana Bull, Aaron Drown, Jennifer Trujillo (Disney Channel); Big City Greens – Tatiana Bull, Aaron Drown (Disney Channel); Eureka! – Jennifer Trujillo (Disney Junior); The Proud Family: Louder and Prouder – Tatiana Bull, Aaron Drown (Disney+); Spirit Rangers – Rene Haynes, Elise Buedel, Allyson Bosch (Netflix)

=== Choreography and Stunts ===
Choreography
Outstanding Choreography: Monster High: The Movie – Heather Laura Gray (Nickelodeon); Blue's Big City Adventure – Lindsey Blaufarb, Craig Hollamon (Nickelodeon); Bunk'd – Lilian Manansala (Disney Channel); High School Musical: The Musical: The Series – Zach Woodlee (Disney+); Snow Day – Heather Laura Gray (Nickelodeon)	Outstanding Stunt Coordination for a Live Action Program: The Guardians of the Galaxy Holiday Special – Heidi Moneymaker (Disney+); Danger Force – Vince Deadrick Jr. (Nickelodeon); The Really Loud House – Dorenda Moore (Nickelodeon); Sweet Tooth – Steve McQuillan (Netflix); Ultra Violet & Black Scorpion – James Lew (Disney Channel); The Villains of Valley View – Danny Wayne (Disney Channel)

=== Cinematography and Lighting ===
Cinematography
Outstanding Cinematography for a Live Action Single-Camera Program: Sweet Tooth – John Cavill, Dave Garbett, Rob Marsh (Netflix); Jane – George Lajtai, Gavin Smith (Apple TV+); Lost Ollie – C. Kim Miles (Netflix); The Mysterious Benedict Society – Christopher Baffa (Disney+); The Santa Clauses – JP Wakayama (Disney+); Waffles + Mochi's Restaurant – Christopher Gill, Dominique Martinez, Paul Yee (Netflix)	Outstanding Cinematography for a Live Action Multiple-Camera Program: Family Reunion – John Simmons (Netflix); Raven’s Home – Clifford Jones (Disney Channel); The Villains of Valley View – Robin Strickland (Disney Channel)
Outstanding Lighting, Camera and Technical Arts: Lost Ollie – Blaine Ackerly, Brad Creasser, Junichi Hosoi, Ryan McGregor (Netflix); Jane – Mark Baluk, Sam Lewis, George Lajtai, Gavin Smith (Apple TV+); Malory Towers – Chris Davies, Jordan Hëguy, Jason Webber, Arthur Cooper, Dan Evans, Nelson Rogers, Stephen Evans (BYUtv); Sweet Tooth – Giles Coburn, Sam Jellie (Netflix); Waffles + Mochi's Restaurant – Theodore Rysz III, Daniel Fritz, June Zandona, Dino Dumandan (Netflix)

=== Costumes, Makeup and Hairstyling ===
Styling
Outstanding Costume Design/Styling: The Guardians of the Galaxy Holiday Special (Disney+); Helpsters (Apple TV+); High School Musical: The Musical: The Series (Disney+); Malory Towers (BYUtv); Raven’s Home (Disney Channel); Sweet Tooth (Netflix)	Outstanding Makeup and Hairstyling: The Guardians of the Galaxy Holiday Special (Disney+); Monster High: The Movie (Nickelodeon); Odd Squad (PBS Kids); The Santa Clauses (Disney+); Sweet Tooth (Netflix)

=== Editing ===
Editing
Outstanding Editing for a Single Camera Program: Lost Ollie – Ryan Chan, Debby Germino (Netflix); The Muppets Mayhem – Kevin Kelsey, Kevin Leffler, Alan MacKulin, William Marrinson (Disney+); National Treasure: Edge of History – Susana Benaim, Louis Bravo, Ray Daniels III, Matt Maddox, Barrie Wise (Disney+); Sweet Tooth – Michael Berenbaum, David Bilow, John Dietrick (Netflix); Waffles + Mochi's Restaurant – John Cason, James Fitzpatrick, Courtney Goldman, Ikpemoghena “Ace” Ikharo (Netflix)	Outstanding Editing for a Multiple Camera Program: Nick News – Scott Tomaino, Justin Coloma, Mainak Dhar, Aaron Moles, Nix Lynn Ullrich (Nickelodeon); Erin & Aaron – Nancy Morrison (Nickelodeon); Family Reunion – Russell Griffin (Netflix); Sesame Street – Joseph DiGiacomo, Fritz Archer, William D'Amico, Ed Kulzer, Jordan Santora, Rich Woolf Jr. (HBO Max); That Girl Lay Lay – Paul Coneys (Nickelodeon); Young Dylan – Nathan Grout (Nickelodeon)
Outstanding Editing for a Preschool Animated Program: Star Wars: Young Jedi Adventures – Danielle Altura, Zachary Bulman, Pamela Cabrera, Petrus Gammelgard, Brian Dawley, Louis Legge (Disney+); Ada Twist, Scientist – Paul Forde (Netflix); Frog and Toad – Josh Glass, Nicholas Veith, Robby Wells (Apple TV+); Get Rolling With Otis – Michelle Connolly, Fiona Hamilton, Martha Meyler, Ciarán O'Toole, Peter Williams (Apple TV+); StoryBots: Answer Time – Nico Colaleo, Rachael Russakoff, Evan Spiridellis, Edgar Cheung, Stella Lightheart, Martin Wichmann Andersen (Netflix)	Outstanding Editing for an Animated Program: Baymax! – Sarah Reimers, Shannon Stein (Disney+); Cars on the Road – Jason Brodkey, Serena Warner (Disney+); Moon Girl and Devil Dinosaur – Sandra Powers, Ryan Burkhard, Phil Lomboy (Disney Channel); My Dad the Bounty Hunter – Donnell Ebarrette (Netflix); Reindeer in Here – Gavin Ebedes (CBS); The Wonderful Summer of Mickey Mouse – Emily Rifkin (Disney+); Zootopia+ – Jeff Draheim, Shannon Stein (Disney+)

=== Main Title and Graphics ===
Main Title
Outstanding Main Title and Graphics
- Moon Girl and Devil Dinosaur (Disney Channel)
  - Kiff (Disney Channel)
  - The Mysterious Benedict Society (Disney+)
  - National Treasure: Edge of History (Disney+)
  - Star Wars: Young Jedi Adventures (Disney+)
  - SuperKitties (Disney Junior)

=== Music ===
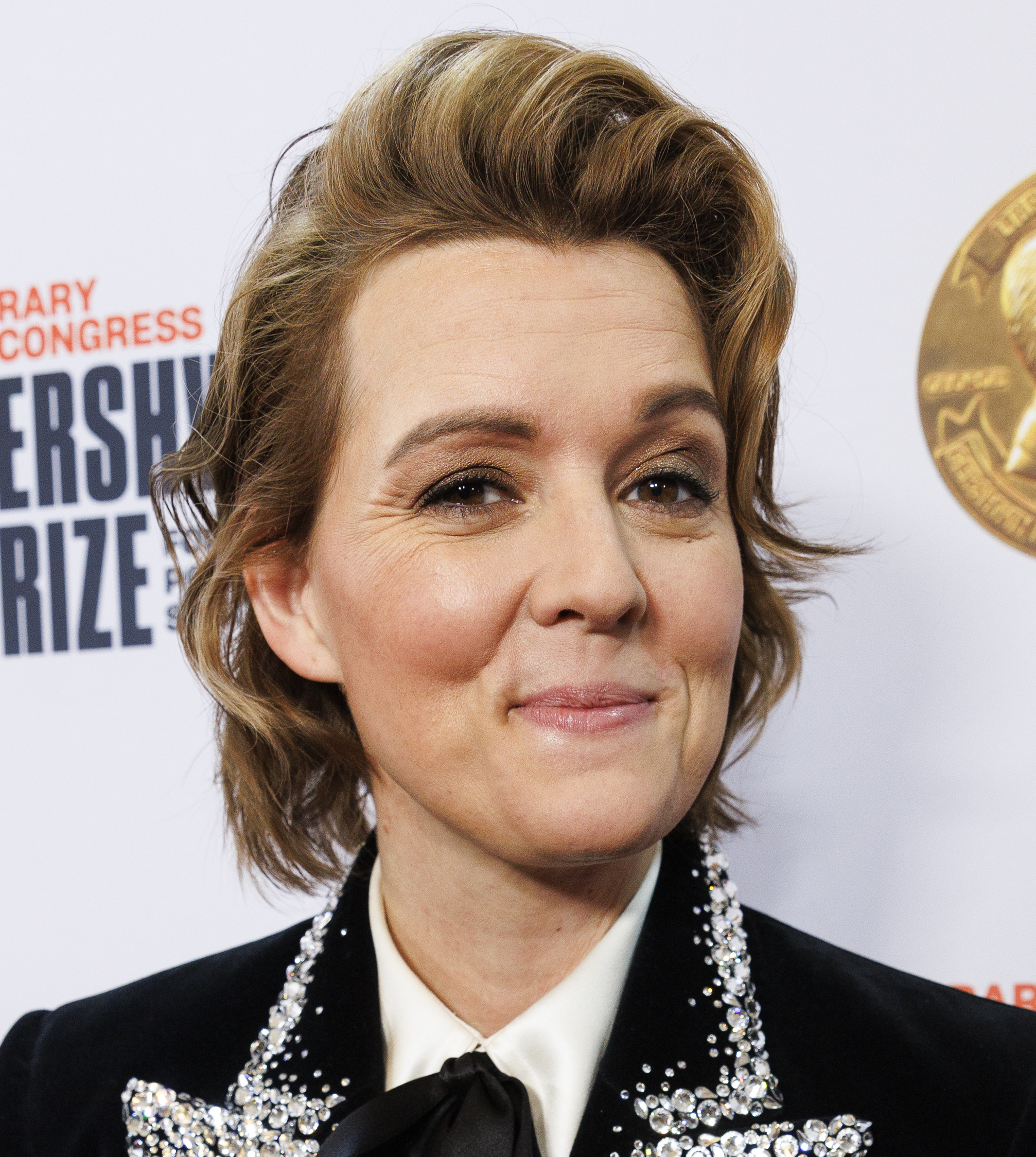
Brandi Carlile, Outstanding Original Song for a Preschool Program winner

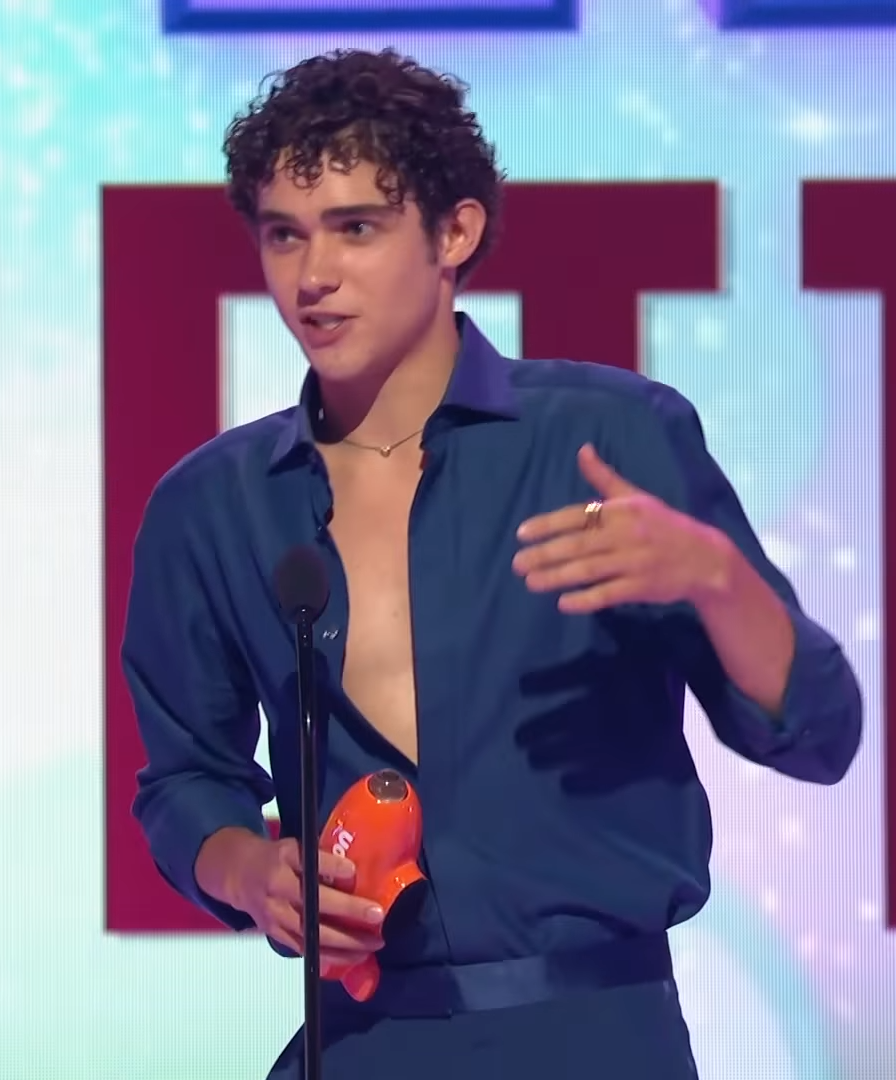
Joshua Bassett, Outstanding Original Song for a Children’s and Young Teen Program co-winner

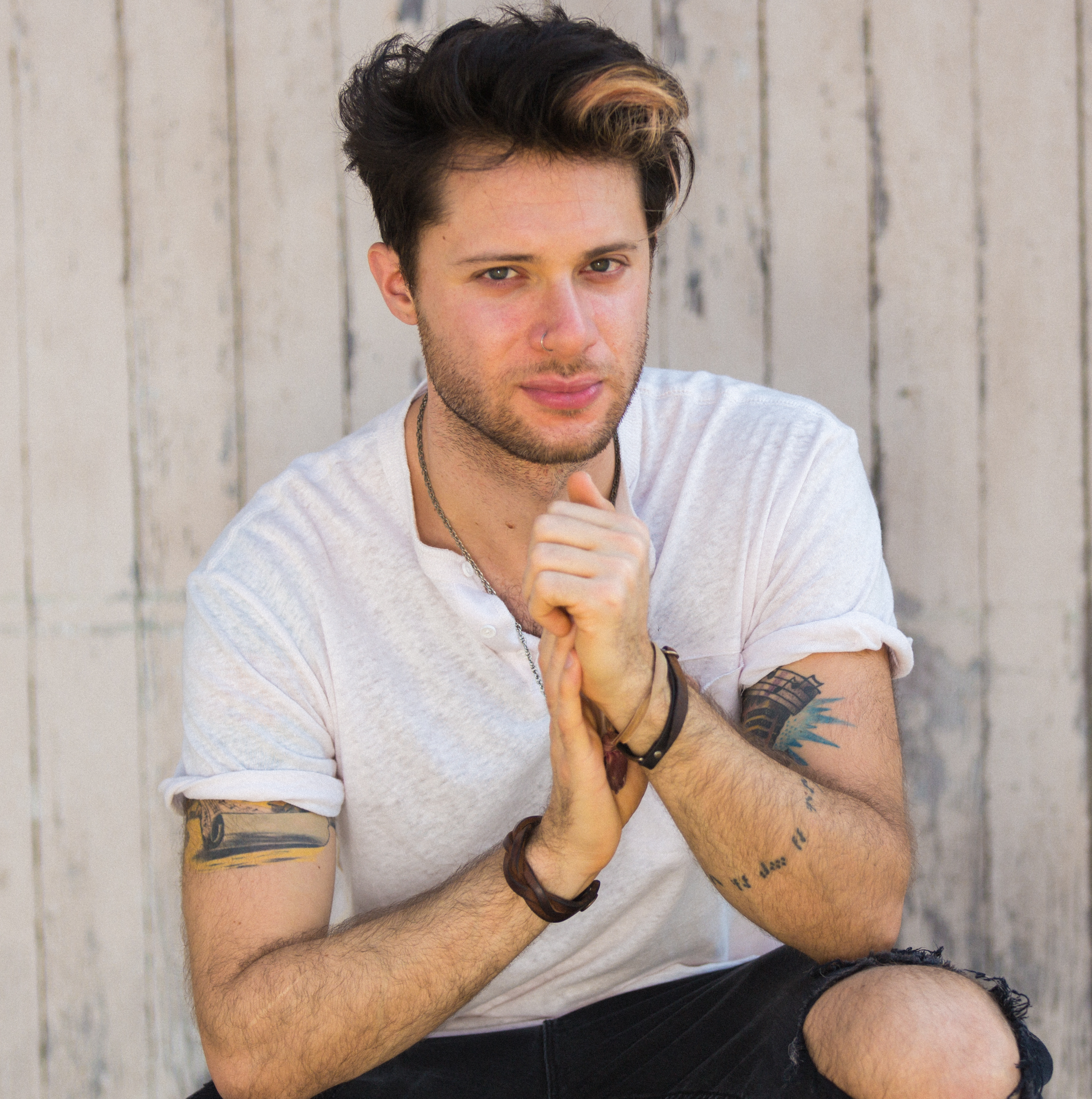
Doug Rockwell, Outstanding Original Song for a Children’s and Young Teen Program co-winner

Music
Outstanding Music Direction and Composition for a Live Action Program: Lost Ollie – Scot Stafford, Stephen Spies and Justine von Winterfeldt (Netflix); The Guardians of the Galaxy Holiday Special – John Murphy (Disney+); Ivy and Bean: The Ghost Who Had to Go – Michael Yezerski (Netflix); Monster High: The Movie – Laura Webb, Sunna Wehrmeijer, Lindsay Wolfington (Nickelodeon); The Mysterious Benedict Society – Garrett Gonzales, Siddhartha Khosla, Theodore Shapiro (Disney+)	Outstanding Music Direction and Composition for an Animated Program: Kung Fu Panda: The Dragon Knight – Kevin Lax, Robert Lydecker, Vivian Aguiar-Buff, Alexandra Nickson and Clare Yezerski (Netflix); Animaniacs – Julie Bernstein, Steven Bernstein (Hulu); Looney Tunes Cartoons – Carl Johnson, Joshua Moshier (HBO Max); Star Wars: Young Jedi Adventures – Matthew Margeson (Disney+)
Outstanding Original Song for a Preschool Program: Jam Van: "One Sacred Thing" - Brandi Carlile (YouTube Kids); Alice's Wonderland Bakery: "The Hat Makes the Hatter" - John Kavanaugh, Chelsea Beyl, Marisa Evans-Sanden (Disney Junior); Jam Van: "The City of Brotherly Love" - Chris Jackson, Nathan Morris, Wanya Morris, Shawn Stockman (YouTube Kids); Mira, Royal Detective: "One Big Family" - Jeannie Lurie, Matthew Tishler (Disney Junior); Sesame Street: "Community is Everything" - Clay Sears, Laura Canty-Samuel (HBO Max)	Outstanding Original Song for a Children’s and Young Teen Program: High School Musical: The Musical: The Series: "Finally Free" - Joshua Bassett, Tova Litvin, Doug Rockwell (Disney+); The Cuphead Show!: "Roll the Dice" - Ego Plum, Dave Wasson (Netflix); High School Musical: The Musical: The Series: "You Never Know" - Mitch Allan, Chantry Johnson, Michelle Zarlenga (Disney+); Monster High: The Movie: "Coming Out of the Dark" - Max Corwin, Joshua Silverberg, Lindsey Sweat (Nickelodeon); Snow Day: "These Kids" - Jeannie Lurie, Matthew Tishler (Nickelodeon)

=== Sound ===
Sound
Outstanding Sound Mixing and Sound Editing for a Live Action Program: Are You Afraid of the Dark?: Ghost Island – David Hernandez, Gord Hillier, Pat Haskill, Dean Giammarco, Bill Sheppard, Julia Graff, Joseph Watts, Maureen Murphy, Gordon Sproule, David Chen (Nickelodeon); Freeridge – Andrew Dawson, Akash Singh, Craig Hunter, Frank Morrone, Derek Syverud (Netflix); Lost Ollie – Jamey Scott, Rob Hanchar, Michael Williamson, Jonathan Stevens, Joshua Winget (Netflix); Monster High: The Movie – Miguel Nunes, Rylan Kerbes, Ryan Thompson, Aaron Olson, Meagan Carsience, Alex Macla, Devon Quelch (Nickelodeon); Waffles + Mochi's Restaurant – Tess Fournier, Jacob Cook, Kate Finan, Logan Romjue, Jessey Drake, Tim Vindigni (Netflix); Zombies 3 – Sandra Portman, Kelly Cole, Bill Mellow, Hugh Wielenga, Henry Embry, Daryl Purdy, Aaron Olson, Phil Mahoney, Mike Flicker, Meagan Carsience, Matt Friedman, Javier Iván Pérez, Tim McCann, Shane Rees (Disney+)	Outstanding Sound Mixing and Sound Editing for a Preschool Animated Program: Star Wars: Young Jedi Adventures – Fil Brown, Melissa Ellis, Heather Olsen, David Bonilla, John "J" Lampinen, Robbi Smith (Disney+); Let's Go Luna! – Mike Mancuso, Joe Tetreau, Patrick Mallan, Ryan Eligh, Matt McKenzie (PBS Kids); Ridley Jones – Ryan Johnston, Ernie Sheesley, James Lafferty, Jamie Simone, Suzanne Goldfish, Terry Reif, Joshua Johnson, Ron Salaises, Taryn Simone (Netflix); Santiago of the Seas – Brad Meyer, Jacob Cook, Jayson Niner, Vivian Williams, Carol Ma, Kenny Carkeet, Logan Romjue (Nickelodeon); Sesame Street: The Nutcracker, Starring Elmo and Tango – David Yapp, Richard Lambert, Paul Rudolph (HBO Max)
Outstanding Sound Mixing and Sound Editing for an Animated Program: I Am Groot – Coya Elliott, Tony Villaflor, Kyrsten Mate, Anele Onyekwere, Tom Kramer, James Spencer, Malcolm Fife, Shelley Roden, John Roesch, Scott Curtis (Disney+); Batman and Superman: Battle of the Super Sons – Rob McIntyre, Jeff Halbert, Lawrence Reyes, DJ Lynch, Mark A. Keatts, Kelly Foley Downs, Patrick Foley, Mike Garcia, Jon Abelardo, Mark Mercado, Vincent Guisetti, Aran Tanchum (Warner Bros.); Kung Fu Panda: The Dragon Knight – Rob McIntyre, DJ Lynch, Anna Adams, Evan Dockter, Marc Schmidt, Monique Reymond, Cat Gensler, Roberto Alegria (Netflix); Rise of the Teenage Mutant Ninja Turtles: The Movie – Jeff Shiffman, Jacob Cook, Jessey Drake, Brad Meyer, Xinyue Yu, Carol Ma (Netflix); Star Trek: Prodigy – Otis Van Osten, Josh Eckberg, Brittany Ellis, Matt Klimek, Ron Salaises, Michael Wessner, Aran Tanchum, Vincent Guisetti, Tommy Sarioglou, Nami Melumad (Nickelodeon)

=== Visual and Special Effects ===
Effects
Outstanding Visual Effects for a Live Action Program
- Jane (Apple TV+)
- Lost Ollie (Netflix)
  - Circuit Breakers (Apple TV+)
  - Shape Island (Apple TV+)
  - Sweet Tooth (Netflix)

=== Lifetime Achievement Award ===
- Peter Cullen

== Shows with multiple nominations ==
12 nominations

- Sesame Street

11 nominations

- Sweet Tooth

10 nominations

- Lost Ollie

9 nominations

- The Mysterious Benedict Society

8 nominations

- Moon Girl and Devil Dinosaur

7 nominations

- Spirit Rangers
- The Guardians of the Galaxy Holiday Special
- The Santa Clauses

6 nominations

- High School Musical: The Musical: The Series
- Monster High: The Movie
- The Muppets Mayhem

5 nominations

- Jane
- Raven's Home
- Star Wars: Young Jedi Adventures
- StoryBots: Answer Time
- Waffles + Mochi's Restaurant

4 nominations

- Baymax!
- Helpsters
- Kung Fu Panda: The Dragon Knight
- Malory Towers

3 nominations

- Ada Twist, Scientist
- Circuit Breakers
- Donkey Hodie
- Looney Tunes Cartoons
- National Treasure: Edge of History
- Nick News
- Oni: Thunder God's Tale
- The Adventures of Paddington
- The Tiny Chef Show
- Zootopia+

2 nominations

- All-Round Champion
- Animaniacs
- Are You Afraid of the Dark?
- Best Foot Forward
- Big City Greens
- Chang Can Dunk
- Family Reunion
- Fraggle Rock: Back to the Rock
- I Am Groot
- Interrupting Chicken
- Ivy + Bean
- Jam Van
- Kiff
- My Dad the Bounty Hunter
- Reindeer in Here
- Rise of the Teenage Mutant Ninja Turtles: The Movie
- Snow Day
- SuperKitties
- The Crossover
- The Cuphead Show!
- The Villains of Valley View
- The Wonderful Summer of Mickey Mouse
- Ultra Violet & Black Scorpion
