= Children's and Family Emmy Award for Outstanding Animated Series =

Award for Outstanding Animated Series

- Awarded for: Outstanding Animated Series
- Country: United States
- Presented by: Academy of Television Arts & Sciences
- First award: 2022
- Currently held by: Win or Lose (2025)
- Website: theemmys.tv/childrens/

This is a list of winners and nominees of the Children's and Family Emmy Award for Outstanding Children's or Young Teen Animated Series, which honors animated programs both in broadcast and streaming television aimed at young viewers from age six to fifteen. The category was established at the 1st Children's and Family Emmy Awards in 2022, and is a sister category to the Children's and Family Emmy Award for Outstanding Preschool Animated Series, which honors shows aimed at younger audiences.

The inaugural recipient of the award was Netflix series City of Ghosts. The current holder of the award is the Disney+ series Win or Lose, which won at the 4th Children's and Family Emmy Awards.

== Background ==
On November 17, 2021, the NATAS announced the creation of the Children's and Family Emmy Awards to recognize the best in children's and family television. The organization cited an "explosive growth in the quantity and quality of children’s and family programming" as justification for a dedicated ceremony. Many categories of the awards were previously presented at the Daytime Emmy Awards. Animated programming aimed towards children was honored from 1985 to 2021 with the Daytime Emmy Award for Outstanding Children's Animated Program. Following the establishment of the Children's and Family Emmy Awards, this award was discontinued.

== Winners and nominations ==
=== 2020s ===
Year	Series	Producers	Network	Ref
2022 (1st)
2022 (1st)	City of Ghosts	Elizabeth Ito (executive producer); Joanne Shen (co-executive producer); Dayla Kennedy (line producer)	Netflix	
2022 (1st)	The Cuphead Show! (Season 1)	CJ Kettler, Chad Moldenhauer, Jared Moldenhauer, Dave Wasson (executive producer); Cosmo Segurson (co-executive producer); Carolyn Roach, Jackie Watson (line producers)	Netflix	
2022 (1st)	The Proud Family: Louder and Prouder (Season 1)	Ralph Farquhar, Bruce W. Smith (executive producers); Calvin Brown Jr. (co-executive producer); Jan Hirota (producer); Amanda Young (line producer)	Disney+	
2022 (1st)	Star Trek: Prodigy (Season 1 Part 1)	Aaron Baiers, Kevin Hageman, Dan Hageman, Heather Kadin, Katie Krentz, Alex Kurtzman, Eugene Roddenberry, Trevor Roth (executive producers); Ben Hibon (co-executive producer); Patrick Krebs (senior supervising producer); Macgregor Middleton (producer); Robyn Johnson (content producer); Julie Benson, Shawna Benson, Chad Quandt, Aaron J. Waltke (creative producers); Tanya Melendez (series producer); Jennifer Gay (line producer)	Paramount+	
2022 (1st)	A Tale Dark & Grimm	Bug Hall, David Henrie, James Henrie, Bob Higgins, Doug Langdale, Simon Otto, Jon Rutherford (executive producers); Chris Henderson (supervising producer); Audrey Velichka (producer); Adam Gidwtz (consulting producer)	Netflix	
2023 (2nd)
2023 (2nd)	Zootopia+	Jared Bush, Byron Howard, Jennifer Lee (executive producers); Nathan Curtis (producer)	Disney+	
2023 (2nd)	Baymax!	Don Hall, Jennifer Lee (executive producers); Roy Conli, Bradford Simonsen (producers)	Disney+	
2023 (2nd)	Big City Greens (Season 3 Part 2)	Shane Houghton, Chris Houghton (executive producers); Stephen Sandoval (co-executive producer); Michael Coughlin (producer); Kevin Donelan (associate producer)	Disney Channel	
2023 (2nd)	Moon Girl and Devil Dinosaur (Season 1)	Laurence Fishburne, Steve Loter, Helen Sugland (executive producers); Rodney Clouden (supervising producer); Pilar Flynn (producer); Jeffrey M. Howard, Kate Kondell (co-executive producers); Rafaael Chidez (line producer); Lisa Muse Bryant (consulting producer)	Disney Channel	
2023 (2nd)	Oni: Thunder God's Tale	Robert Kondo, Kane Lee, Daisuke “Dice” Tsutsumi (executive producers); Megan Bartel (co-executive producer); Sara K. Sampson (producer)	Netflix	
2024 (3rd)
2024 (3rd)	Moon Girl and Devil Dinosaur (Season 2 Part 1)	Laurence Fishburne, Steve Loter, Helen Sugland (executive producers); Rodney Clouden, Pilar Flynn (supervising producers); Rafael Chaidez (producer); Laura Leganza Reynolds (line producer); Cameron Castillo (associate producer); Jeffrey M. Howard, Kate Kondell (co-producer/story editor)	Disney Channel	
2024 (3rd)	Curses! (Season 1)	Jim Cooper, Jeff Dixon, John Krasinski (executive producers); Allyson Seeger (co-executive producer); Leo Riley (supervising producer); Clarise Cameron, Kelley Derr (line producer)	Apple TV+	
2024 (3rd)	Hilda (Season 3)	Clint Eland, Kurt Mueller (executive producers); Bryan Korn, Luke Pearson, Stephanie Simpson (co-executive producers); Andy Coyle (supervising producer); Steve Jacobson, Chantal Ling, Rachel Simon (producers); Emerald Wright-Collie (series producer); Sarah Laight, Kathleen McKinnon, Victor Reyes (line producers); Monique Simmon (associate producer)	Netflix	
2024 (3rd)	Iwájú	Byron Howard, Jennifer Lee (executive producers); Christina Chen (producer)	Disney+	
2024 (3rd)	Kiff	Antonio Canobbio, Lucy Heavens, Ben Kalina, Chris Prynoski, Shannon Prynoski, Nic Smal (executive producers); Winnie Chaffee (supervising producer); Matt Burns, Kayla Reid (line producers); Kent Osborne (co-producer/story editor)	Disney Channel	
2024 (3rd)	Summer Camp Island (Season 6)	Julia Pott, Sam Register (executive producers); Rossitza Likomanova, Cole Sanchez (supervising producers)	Cartoon Network	
2025 (4th)
2025 (4th)	Win or Lose	Carrie Hobson, David Lally, Michael Yates (executive producers)	Disney+	
2025 (4th)	Big City Greens (Season 4 Part 1)	Chris Houghton, Shane Houghton (executive producers); Stephen Sandoval (Co-Executive Producer); Mike Coughlin (producer); Kevin Donelan (line producer)	Disney+	
2025 (4th)	Dream Productions	Mike Jones and Jaclyn Simon (executive producers)	Disney+	
2025 (4th)	Wolf King	Angelo Abela, Tim Compton, Kate Little, Claire Poyser (executive producers); Barry Quinn (creative producer)	Netflix	
2025 (4th)	Wylde Pak	Seonna Hong, Kyle Marshall, Conrad Vernon, Paul Watling (executive producers); Jessica Chandra (line producer)	Nickelodeon	

== Individuals with multiple nominations ==
3 nominations

- Byron Howard
- Jennifer Lee

2 nominations

- Helen Sugland
- Jeffrey M. Howard
- Kate Kondell
- Laurence Fishburne
- Pilar Flynn
- Rafael Chaidez
- Rodney Clouden

== Programs with multiple nominations ==
2 nominations

- Big City Greens
- Moon Girl and Devil Dinosaur

== Networks with multiple nominations ==
11 nominations

- Disney+/Disney Channel

6 nominations

- Netflix
