= List of Kiff episodes =

Kiff is an animated musical comedy television series created by Lucy Heavens and Nic Smal and produced by Disney Television Animation in association with Titmouse, Inc. It follows the lives of two friends, Kiff Chatterley, an anthropomorphic squirrel, and Barry Buns, an anthropomorphic rabbit, who find themselves in various shenanigans around the fictional city of Table Town. The series debuted on March 10, 2023, on Disney Channel, and the second season premiered on March 15, 2025. 61 episodes of Kiff have been broadcast across two seasons, with a third season and fourth special forthcoming.

== Series overview ==
Season	Segments	Episodes	Originally released	
Season	Segments	Episodes	First released	Last released
Pilot			—N/a	—N/a
1	58	30	March 10, 2023	February 10, 2024
Specials			October 5, 2024	December 1, 2026
2	54	28	March 15, 2025	November 22, 2025
3	TBA	TBA	January 20, 2027	TBA

== Episodes ==
=== Pilot ===
An animatic pilot episode was produced prior to the series' greenlight in 2021 and was later reworked into the episode "Hat". During this period, the series had the working title Donk, and Kiff and Barry's names were Donk and Bunny Guinness, respectively. The pilot was leaked online in April 2024, alongside other pilots and production pieces from Disney and Cartoon Network.

Title	Written by	Storyboarded by
"Pilot"	Lucy Heavens, Nic Smal & Kent Osborne (Note: The writers who wrote "Hat" possibly wrote the pilot due to the same plot.)	Nic Smal (Note: Nic Smal possibly storyboarded the pilot due to his work on the reworked episode, "Hat".)
After a hat that Bunny Guinness brings to "Bring a Thing" proves popular (so much that everyone in the school tries to steal it), Donk tries to keep it safe so that Bunny can show everyone at an event later. A strong wind causes a series of misadventures for Donk in trying to retrieve it, including Helen, who wants the hat for herself. After accidentally shredding the hat, Donk pretends to be the hat, but realizes that everyone actually likes Bunny, not the hat.

=== Season 1 (2023–24) ===
No. overall	No. in season	Title	Written by	Storyboarded by	Original release date	Prod. code	U.S. viewers (millions)
1	1	"Thirst to Be the First"	Quinn Scott	Drew Applegate & Allison Craig	March 10, 2023	101	0.14
1	1	"The Fourth Bath"	Quinn Scott	James Sugrue & Elena Manetta	March 10, 2023	101	0.14
Thirst to Be the First: Kiff is ready to be the first person to use the school's new water fountain, but a bad case of "droop-tail" ends up ruining her plans. She sets up various schemes to get past her father and in school, and it almost works - but she ends up falling asleep and misses out. However, Barry creates a photo of a basketball painted with Kiff's face on it drinking the fountain, satisfying Kiff. The Fourth Bath: Kiff is excited to sleep over at Barry's house until she finds out that the Buns share bath water, and that she will take the fourth bath. Not wanting to bathe in used water, Kiff decides to call "switchies" with the Buns siblings in order to go first but inadvertently causes them to quarrel with each other. Feeling guilty, Kiff apologizes to everyone for her actions, and to make it up to them, she takes the last bath, which goes over surprisingly well.
2	2	"Pool Party"	Kent Osborne	Brett Muller	March 10, 2023	102	0.12
2	2	"Road Trip"	Claytia Gonsalves	James Sugrue	March 10, 2023	102	0.12
Pool Party: The entire class is invited to Candle Fox's pool party, but Barry reveals to Kiff that he can't swim. Kiff asks Helen, a witch at her school, to cast a spell on Barry to help him swim, to which she agrees on the condition that the former helps her meet Candle's father, Roy, in hopes to get on a TV show. Kiff tries to prevent this from happening when she realizes that Roy's plans are to get the witch on a show making fun of her, which results in Helen revoking the spell. Kiff saves Barry from falling in the water and drowning but simultaneously trashes the place and they get banned for a year. Helen then thanks Kiff for saving her reputation and Kiff promises to help Barry learn how to swim during their one-year ban from Candle's pool. Road Trip: The Chatterleys and Barry go on a road trip, much to Kiff's dismay, who is not a fan of Martin's tedious rules and rituals. During this, Kiff and Barry tease the leader of a bike gang and are pursued by the group. Kiff and Barry confess to Beryl and Martin about it and they try their best to get away. It's later revealed that the bike gang was really a group of auto mechanics, who were trying to help fix the Chatterleys' car. It also turns out that the road trip was really a test drive for the real one.
3	3	"Brunch DJ"	Kent Osborne	Allyson Gonzalez	March 18, 2023 (Note: This episode was first released on Disney+ on March 11, 2023.)	103	0.14
3	3	"Career Day"	Koby Agyeman	Brett Muller	March 18, 2023	103	0.14
Brunch DJ: After Kiff and Barry witness the latter's brother, Harry, escaping from school, Principal Secretary tasks the two with finding him. Later, it is discovered that Harry has been working at a café as a DJ. Not wanting to get Harry in trouble for playing hooky, Kiff explains the importance of school with a song when the Principal arrives at the café and tries to expel Harry. When it turns out that having no education would impede Harry from fulfilling his dream, everyone turns against Secretary, so he lets Harry go back to school. Career Day: Kiff and Barry take a summer job, working at the city hall, even though Barry would rather work as a garbage man. The job is not what they expected, as it's required to fill out lots of paperwork, so Kiff and Barry decide to skip the forms by shredding them and go straight to helping people. This becomes an issue when their boss, Glarbin Gloobin, wants them to file the forms they "filled out". Kiff and Barry trick him into believing that all the paperwork was stolen, but he finds out about the ruse when the paper shredder explodes. But before Glarbin can fire them, the townsfolk inform him of how Kiff and Barry helped them. Then, Glarbin's former employees ask for their jobs back and Kiff and Barry start working as garbage men.
4	4	"The Five Pigeons of the Acapellapocalypse"	Kent Osborne	Allyson Gonzalez	March 18, 2023	104	0.11
4	4	"Leave a Little Juice"	Quinn Scott	Allyson Gonzalez	March 18, 2023	104	0.11
The Five Pigeons of the Acapellapocalypse: After finding a pigeon figure at a yard sale, Kiff finds out that there are four more figures to complete the set. After she and Barry collect all five, though, they end up coming to life as "The Five Pigeons of the Acapellapocalypse" and cause havoc around Table Town. The only way to stop them is to separate them, so Kiff and Barry recruit Helen to do so. After being separated, however, the pigeons become very lonely, so Kiff gives Roy Fox (whose shows' ratings had taken a dive) the idea to use them in a reality show, "The Five Jerks", focusing on their lives completely locked up in a mansion on a far-away island together. Leave a Little Juice: After Barry had finished all of Martin's OJ, which is the latter's favorite drink, Beryl asks Kiff to tell Barry not to do that anymore. However, Kiff cannot bring herself to do that, not wanting to hurt Barry's feelings, so she avoids saying anything about it. This becomes a problem when Barry keeps dropping his glasses of OJ and wasting the drink. Eventually, the whole carton is emptied and Kiff convinces Martin that it wouldn't be right to hurt Barry's feelings. It's then Beryl who asks Barry not to drink all the OJ, to which Barry nonchalantly agrees, much to Kiff and Martin's surprise. Kiff realizes that Barry actually likes it when people tell him the truth. Later, the Chatterleys' neighbor, the Pone, arrives to give the family a carton of OJ (as a repayment for Barry trying to give him some earlier), which Martin turns down just because he dislikes the Pone.
5	5	"Big Barry on Campus"	Claytia Gonsalves	Taylor Curry & Elena Manetta	March 25, 2023	105	0.12
5	5	"Club Book"	Claytia Gonsalves	Brett Muller	March 25, 2023	105	0.12
Big Barry on Campus: After noticing an error with her school ID, Helen sends a "computer gremlin" into the Principal's computer to fix it. However, it accidentally causes Barry's name to be mixed in with the high schoolers file, making Principal Secretary think he belongs there. Kiff is despondent over this, so she goes to high school with Barry. However, the two grow to hate high school and try to prove to the Principal that they don't belong there. Just when Secretary is about to send Kiff and Barry to different schools, the computer gremlin is discovered and Helen uses a spell to reboot the computer, sending Kiff and Barry back to Miss Dear Teacher's class where they belong. Club Book: Kiff finds it unfair that you have to be quiet at the library, so she gains legal ownership of the library to allow people to be loud. However, Kiff quickly discovers the disadvantages of a loud library, especially when a party is thrown in the building. She recruits the former librarian, Miss Moufflé (who now works as a soufflé baker), to turn the loud library quiet again. After the two enter the library through a secret passageway, Kiff puts on quiet music to get everyone to shush and Miss Moufflé closes the loud library for good. Afterward, Miss Mouflé fixes up a room for loud readers to be as loud as they want.
6	6	"Kiff's Mix"	Quinn Scott	Allyson Gonzalez	March 25, 2023	106	0.13
6	6	"Kiff's on a Plane"	Quinn Scott	Thomas Hudson	March 25, 2023	106	0.13
Kiff's Mix: While playing at Trevor's house, Kiff, Barry, and Trevor create an amazing cereal mix by combining many different kind together. However, when the three to make it again, they forget which kinds of cereal they used. Kiff calls the science lab to get the cereal's milk analyzed so they'll remember the ingredients they used. The scientist at the lab finds that the cereal contains one unknown ingredient, later revealed to be Barry's tears, which are triggered by commercials on TV. However, Trevor lets making the cereal go to his head, revealing to the other two his plans to form a corporation with them, which Kiff doesn't want. However, when everybody finds out about the secret ingredient, they get disgusted and leave. At Kiff's house, Trevor apologizes for his actions as he, Kiff, and Barry eat Kiff's Mix and cry at a commercial. Kiff's on a Plane: Beryl's old college friends, Meryl, Deryl, and Cheryl, visit her. Wanting to appear grown up to Beryl and her friends, Kiff decides to go to pilot school to prove that she's just as cool as them. Barry soon arrives to find Kiff and gets enrolled too. After lots of practice, Kiff invites Beryl and her friends to her junior pilot test. At the test (which is much simpler than was wished for), Kiff appears to be doing well, but she gets distracted by a fantasy and is hit by a volleyball, suffering a humiliating fail. Kiff then reveals the true reason why she had joined pilot school and leaves the school with her mom and friends on good terms.
7	7	"Farley"	Kent Osborne	Adam Bohorquez & Taylor Curry	April 1, 2023	107	0.15
7	7	"Two for One Hot Dogs"	Sarah Lloyd	Taylor Curry	April 1, 2023	107	0.15
Farley: While babysitting Kristophe, Kiff accidentally makes a mess of Farley (Kristophe's doll). To fix the situation, Kiff pretends to be Farley while Barry enlists the help of Helen's sister, Agnes (a drycleaner) to wash the real doll. When Kristophe is about to pull a stunt with "Farley", Kiff pretends that Farley has come to life and the two spend a fun day together, while Barry tries to counsel Helen and Agnes over their sibling rivalry. In the end, Barry returns with the real Farley and Kiff comes to realize how Kristophe really is on the inside. Two for One Hot Dogs: After enjoying two for one hot dogs, Kiff and Barry notice a billboard that reads "It doesn't get any better than this" and misinterpret the message as saying that their best days are behind them. Despondent, the two move into a retirement home. Soon after, Kiff and Barry find the people at the retirement home throwing a party and realize that the message on the billboard was simply an ad that wasn't really true.
8	8	"Halfway There Day"	Sarah Lloyd	James Sugrue	April 1, 2023	108	0.16
8	8	"Be Still My Harp"	Sarah Lloyd	Jacob Ospa & Elena Manetta	April 1, 2023	108	0.16
Halfway There Day: Halfway through the year, Kiff prepares dinner for Halfway There Day (Table Town's take on Christmas), which is about giving 50% in preparation. Beryl tells Kiff the story of Beverly, a woman who prepared a big fancy dinner for Halfway There Day and was kicked out of the "dinner crawl". After Kiff encounters Beverly from the story, the latter sabotages the dinner, but Centaur Claus (a spoof of Santa Claus) scolds everyone for missing the true meaning of Halfway There Day, which is not about giving 50%, but just not being pressured to give 100%. Beverly is then let back in the dinner crawl. Be Still My Harp: While watching a movie, Barry gets stuck in a harp that causes people who hear the music to suddenly get stuck in their memories. When this happens to Kiff, she learns to look forward and escapes her memories. She then pulls Barry out of the harp forward instead of backward, which not only frees him, but snaps everyone out of their trances.
9	9	"Friendiversary"	Kobe Agyeman	Brett Muller	April 8, 2023	109	0.11
9	9	"Totally Table Town"	Claytia Gonsalves	Thomas Hudson	April 8, 2023	109	0.11
Friendiversary: On the day of Kiff and Barry's "friendiversary", the two reminisce on when they first met. When Barry gives Kiff one more gift than she did him, Kiff sets out to find another gift for him, but can't seem to find a gift good enough for him. Meanwhile, Trevor tries to be Barry's new best friend. Thinking she's failed, Kiff runs away, but learns from a train robber that the best present is a hug. Barry tells Kiff that all he wanted was the feeling of giving her a gift and they decide to go on a tractor ride, even inviting Trevor to come along (though it appears he hasn't given up on stealing Barry from Kiff). Totally Table Town: After someone who posts a comment on "TableToob" doubts Table Town's awesomeness, Kiff and her friends film a movie to prove him wrong. While filming the last scene, the gang gets attacked by the Ghost Wolf. After a long chase, it turns out that the Ghost Wolf was really giving their speaker back and herding them to safety. After Kiff posts the movie to the person who commented, it gets a positive reaction, with the commenter turning out to be Martin.
10	10	"Hat"	Lucy Heavens, Nic Smal & Kent Osborne	Nic Smal	April 15, 2023 (Note: This episode was first released on Disney+ on April 12, 2023.)	111	0.19
10	10	"Lost and Found"	Sarah Lloyd	Thomas Hudson	April 15, 2023	111	0.19
Hat: After a hat that Barry brings to "Bring a Thing" proves popular (so much that everyone in the school tries to steal it), Kiff tries to keep it safe so that Barry can show everyone at an event later. A strong wind causes a series of misadventures for Kiff in trying to retrieve it, including Helen, who wants the hat for herself. After accidentally shredding the hat, Kiff pretends to be the hat, but realizes that everyone actually likes Barry, not the hat. Lost and Found: While taking a walk, Kiff and Barry discover a journal. They try to find its owner before Glarbin, who is in charge of the lost and found department, gains ownership of it at the end of the business day. While trying to find clues, Kiff and Barry end up having more and more of the journal's contents revealed, before it's revealed that it belongs to a unicorn named Slent. However, the poems become very popular and Slent gives the money he earned to Kiff and Barry to show his appreciation for them returning the journal.
11	11	"Principal Dance Socks"	Sarah Lloyd	Adam Bohorquez, Thomas Hudson, Taylor Curry, Elena Manetta & James Sugrue	April 22, 2023	110	0.09
In order to prove that Table Town School is just as good as the fancy, rich, and prestigious Tuft Pierre School, Kiff and the gang compete Principal Secretary with Tuft Pierre's principal, Swan, in a dance-off. Since Secretary's dancing is less than perfect, Helen and the kids give him magic dance socks to make him appear much better (with Helen controlling Secretary's moves). After Secretary wins, the snobby big kids from Tuft Pierre School give the credit to Swan, who was on Roy Fox's "Dancing with the Tables", for winning. The kids decide to put Principal Secretary on the show to prove that he won. However, Helen is upset that she hasn't been given credit for controlling Principal Secretary's dancing and ends up sabotaging the show by lousing up his moves. Kiff and the gang then confess that they cheated and say that they are proud of their school, touching everyone's hearts to the point that Swan even decides to quit her job as Principal for Tuft Pierre School.
12	12	"Two Truths and a Bunny"	Claytia Gonsalves	Taylor Curry	April 29, 2023	112	0.24
12	12	"Nicknames"	Koby Agyeman	Brett Muller & Adam Bohorquez	April 29, 2023	112	0.24
Two Truths and a Bunny: When Lizette (one of the members of Candle's "Abra" group) gets droop-tail, Kiff and Barry both take their place in a slumber party in order to find out why Candle calls her group "Abra". At the sleepover, the group plays Two Truths and a Lie, which Barry isn't good at because of his inability to lie. Since Candle can't trust Kiff and Barry to keep the secret about why the group is called the "Abras", Barry seeks advice from his sister, Terri, on how to lie. However, the Abras don't find Barry's lies exciting enough, not even when he reveals that one of the group members, seemingly named "Kennedy", is actually named "Kim". Kiff and Barry later deduce that the group was named after the candelabra (since the first part of the word is Candle's name) before leaving. Nicknames: At a movie theater, Kiff and Barry realize that the ticket ripper, Nick Namé gives people at the theater nicknames because of their actions, and they decide that they want nicknames of their own. After Kiff tries (and fails) to earn the nickname, "Showtime", Beryl reveals that she already has a nickname (as "Kiff" is not her real name) and that everyone likes her, whether she has a nickname or not.
13	13	"The Sound of Helen"	Hannah Jost	Allyson Gonzalez	May 6, 2023	113	0.14
13	13	"Weekly Grocery Shop"	Quinn Scott	James Sugrue	May 6, 2023	113	0.14
The Sound of Helen: Helen "convinces" Principal Secretary to let her create a musical. While the class is excited at first, they are surprised to find that the play, entitled The Sound of Helen, is all about her. When they protest to this, Helen accuses them of ruining her musical and quits as director. The class decides to use how Helen had worked to get the Principal to accept the production as the new plot and rename it My Fair Helen, which receives praise from Helen and everyone else (except for Secretary). Weekly Grocery Shop: The Chatterleys go grocery shopping. Kiff decides to go to the free sample station, Beryl tries to collect 20 coupons to play a crane game, and Martin tries to remember which groceries to buy after he forgets the shopping list. Kiff's delight is spoiled when the new sample station worker, Gordon, only allows paying customers, not kids, to get free samples, so she, Barry, Reggie, and Candle try to trick him into giving them some. Meanwhile, after the last coupon falls into Helen's shopping cart, Beryl tries to get it without Helen noticing, and Martin gets the same groceries that another customer bought, only to find that all the groceries he bought are of a different brand that the Chatterleys normally get. When Beryl uses a fishing pole to sneak the last coupon out of Helen's cart, Helen notices and prepares to curse Beryl into mushroom form for bothering her, but accidentally curses Gordon into a child, who allows free samples for everyone. Afterwards, Kiff finally gets a free sample and Beryl wins a 50-year-old kazoo from the claw machine.
14	14	"Friendship in the Time of Cheese Caves"	Sarah Lloyd	Thomas Hudson	May 13, 2023	114	0.11
14	14	"Soup Opera"	Claytia Gonsalves	Taylor Curry	May 13, 2023	114	0.11
Friendship in the Time of Cheese Caves: Candle and Trevor form a friendship, which is short-lived. On a field trip to the Cheese Caves, Candle enlists the help of Kiff to patch things up with her and Trevor. When Candle and Kiff get trapped in the caves, the former admits that their friendship was ruined when she sent a chunky text to him. Trevor eventually forgives Candle for the chunky text and they reconcile, while Kiff is furious to find that Candle and Trevor's friendship was formed when Candle made fun of her new shorts. Soup Opera: Kiff becomes interested in a soap opera. When she finds that Miss Deer Teacher has been unlucky in love, Kiff uses scenes from the soap opera to help her reconcile with a date. After watching a plot twist in the soap opera with the protagonist's boyfriend revealed to have used her to steal her identity, Kiff and Martin try to stop Miss Dear Teacher's date from doing the same, but it turns out that he was only helping her with taxes, and that Miss Deer Teacher feels that he's not the man she wants to marry. Kiff apologizes to Miss Dear Teacher for meddling in her personal life and she forgives her.
15	15	"Mall Leader"	Lucy Heavens & Nic Smal	Miyako Molinelli & Brian Muelhaupt	May 20, 2023	115	0.15
15	15	"Ghost Wolf's Art"	Hannah Jost	James Sugrue	May 20, 2023	115	0.15
Mall Leader: Upon finding out that she can get a free pretzel from bringing ten people to the mall, Kiff hypnotizes her classmates (excluding Barry) to follow her to the mall, but she quickly regrets this when everyone keeps following her around and won't let her eat her pretzel in peace. She gives the leading duties to Helen, who becomes a slave driver to Kiff's classmates. Realizing she has done wrong, Kiff learns the importance of selflessness, gives her pretzel to Helen, and encourages everyone to just follow themselves. Ghost Wolf's Art: Following on from the events of "Totally Table Town", Kiff is determined to learn more about Ghost Wolf, and she and Barry go to his home, where they learn that he has a passion for painting. Barry helps Ghost Wolf get inspiration by painting pictures of other people's personal lives. At the museum, the people are initially embarrassed and furious to find that Ghost Wolf turned their personal moments into entertainment, but when others empathize by revealing that they have the same embarrassing traits, the art becomes a hit.
16	16	"Fresh Outta Grandmas"	Koby Agyeman	Allyson Gonzalez	June 17, 2023	116	0.14
16	16	"Maybe-sitting"	Quinn Scott	Thomas Hudson	June 17, 2023	116	0.14
Fresh Outta Grandmas: After Kiff, Candle, and Reggie brag about their grandmothers, a competition begins on who can "collect" the most grandmas, with a piece of candy being collected for each grandma. When Kiff and Reggie are tied with the number of grandmas they have, they set out to break the tie by collecting Lady Lorriane, who hates children; Kiff manages to win by calling the other grandmas who are Lady Lorraine's friends, and win the competition. But when the grandmas realize that the kids were spending time with them just for a game, the gang realizes that they've been selfish and return all the pieces of candy to the grandmas and apologize to them (excluding Lorraine). However, what Kiff and the gang didn't notice is that those grandmas were also being selfish by spending time with them just for a game. Maybe-sitting: Wanting to join the Babysitting Society, Kiff visits the Bunses' house, where Harry and Terri are babysitting Kristophe, in order to learn about babysitting. To her dismay, Harry and Terri are only interested in reading magazines, so she tries to get them to be more attentive by pretending that Kristophe is missing, which actually happens right after Harry and Terri had realized Kiff's ruse. Not knowing where to find Kristophe (who is hiding in the closet under the stairs), Kiff forces a reluctant Barry to act as Kristophe while the members of the Babysitting Society to observe Kiff's babysitting, but is eventually forced to tell the truth and is disallowed from joining the club. Mary, however, is so impressed with how Kiff took care of Kristophe that she hires her as Kristophe's permanent babysitter.
17	17	"Everyday I'm Riddlin' Riddlin'"	Sarah Lloyd	Taylor Curry	June 24, 2023	117	0.16
17	17	"Life on the Inside"	Claytia Gonsalves	Miyako Molinelli	June 24, 2023	117	0.16
Everyday I'm Riddlin' Riddlin': Kiff and Barry meet a troll named Trollie, who likes telling riddles, but is depressed, because he lives under a bridge where nobody passes, so the two take him the most used bridge in Table Town, where he makes up riddles that nobody can get the answer to. In order to get him to stop this, Kiff and Barry enlist the help of the Table Town Riddler's Society (consisting of Principal Secretary, Glarbin Gloobin, Ms. Moufflé, and Sweepy Steve) in giving Trollie a riddle that will stump him. When that doesn't work, Trollie resolves to build a second bridge so people can pass without having to guess a riddle. Life on the Inside: After Kiff is accused of breaking a school rule in an attempt to get her classmates to obey it, she is sent to detention along with Barry (after he unsuccessfully tried to stand up for her). Kiff and Barry team up with the other kids who got sent to detention and they eventually manage to break out. The students who got sent to detention then reform, impressing Principal Secretary.
18	18	"Weird Delivery"	Kent Osborne	Allyson Gonzalez	July 1, 2023	118	N/A
18	18	"No Dad Ideas"	Koby Agyeman	James Sugrue	July 1, 2023	118	N/A
Weird Delivery: After spending time with Reggie at his house, Kiff and Barry leave to be taken home by Barry's sister. However, she has to make a pizza delivery to a man who made money off of catapults. When Kiff and Barry are forced to deliver the pizza themselves, Kiff accidentally offends the man, who sends the two sends them both flying off a giant catapult. As it turns out, Kiff and Barry's entire trip home was all part of a virtual reality system that Reggie has been developing. No Dad Ideas: Realizing Kiff does not know what his job is, Martin shows her all the ideas he has as an inventor but isn't confident enough to show them to the public. In order to boost Martin's confidence, she has Terri pretend to be the CEO of her own company, who likes Martin's unique ideas. It works until he realizes the truth about Terri and loses confidence, but Kiff encourages him to keep going. As he advertises his invention idea, the Double Trucker (which is a cap with two bills), everyone leaves except for two birds that he had been feeding, who buy his Double Trucker for a million nuts just so they can repurpose it as a snack holder.
19	19	"Faculty Lounge"	Hannah Jost	Adam Bohorquez & Thomas Hudson	July 8, 2023	119	N/A
19	19	"Personal Assistant"	Quinn Scott	Taylor Curry & Brian Muelhaupt	July 8, 2023	119	N/A
Faculty Lounge: Kiff and Barry are curious about the teacher's faculty lounge, so with Barry's help, Kiff manages to get into the lounge but struggles to get out due to the presence of Mr. RiPeppa, who steals Miss Deer Teacher's sandwich. Eventually, she manages to fool everyone in the lounge by posing as Ms. Foodcake, a new staff member, but her integrity gets the better of her and exposes Mr. RiPeppa as the sandwich thief. As punishment, he is sent to collect frogs all over the playground. Meanwhile, the real Ms. Foodcake is still at the airport waiting to be picked up. Personal Assistant: Kiff is made Helen's personal assistant after taking a test, which she is not too thrilled about. She makes many attempts to get fired so that she can retake the test but to no avail. With Barry's advice, she decides to help Helen get the humanitarian award, which she ends up succeeding in as well. But despite this, Helen was revealed to have sabotaged the results of the test so she could have a personal assistant and steals the award after it was revoked from her. Barry tells Kiff that her success as a personal assistant just meant she was naturally good at it and can do more.
20	20	"Trevor's Rockin' Halloween Bash"	Lucy Heavens, Nic Smal & Kent Osborne	Allyson Gonzalez & Miyako Molinelli	September 29, 2023	120	0.10
Kiff and Barry have their own movie night but Barry is too scared to watch horror movies. They are both invited by Trevor to his party which Candle and her invitees eventually join due to ordering real spiders instead of rubber ones. Kiff sneaks off from Trevor and Barry so she can take part. Barry feels alienated until finding some guests with a book he reads releasing a demonic being in the process.
21	21	"I Like to Move It!"	Quinn Scott	Adam Bohorquez & James Sugrue	October 7, 2023	121	0.12
21	21	"Hive Got an Idea"	Sarah Lloyd	Brian Muelhaupt	October 7, 2023	121	0.12
I Like to Move It!: Kiff and Barry are tasked with moving a piano by Helen in exchange for a horseshoe that can grant any two people a wish for their hearts' desire. Along the way, they meet people who get into arguments in which they eventually get into as well. When the two friends succeed, each tries to say their wish before the other. However, they soon realize they are fighting over something meaningless and decide to wish that they never moved the piano for Helen. Hive Got an Idea: Kiff and Barry are placed in charge of introducing Little Louis to their school. However, the Wall of Goat uses their hive mind to constantly check in on Louis against their word that they wouldn't. Kiff uses some aluminum to keep the Wall of Goat from controlling Louis and disguises herself as a goat to keep them occupied. Eventually, Louis decides he will not return to the Wall of Goat or to school and becomes an airplane designer since he's actually 105 years old.
22	22	"You Can't Handle the Tooth!"	Claytia Gonsalves	Taylor Curry	October 14, 2023	122	0.11
22	22	"Blooper Quest"	Koby Agyeman	Miyako Molinelli	October 14, 2023	122	0.11
You Can't Handle the Tooth!: Kiff is told by her mother to brush her tooth, but she doesn't want to do it immediately and tries to get out of doing it. She eventually realizes that she makes good songs whenever she is doing boring things and sings a song about why she shouldn't have to brush her tooth every morning. Her mother is convinced and decides to have her do it in the evening, which was at that very moment. Blooper Quest: After watching the end-credits blooper reel for a movie, Kiff is inspired to make her own bloopers, in which she is not successful because everything goes perfectly. She ends up making an award winning film, Found in Ambiguity, but then finds herself messing up her speech at the awards ceremony. In the process, she learns that bloopers happen naturally and cannot be forced.
23	23	"When You Mow, You Mow"	Kent Osborne	Adam Bohorquez, Brian Muelhaupt & James Sugrue	October 21, 2023	123	0.19
23	23	"Harry's Maturity Crisis"	Hannah Jost	Allyson Gonzalez	October 21, 2023	123	0.19
When You Mow, You Mow: Kiff and everyone else see Reggie mow his lawn, so Kiff decides that she should be allowed to mow herself. However, all her attempts backfire until she discovers that the handle is adjustable. Harry's Maturity Crisis: Harry is sick of being treated like a little kid so he decides to run away and gets a job. Kiff and Barry decide to run away with him and they begin to frustrate Harry until he realizes that his mother does a lot for him and his siblings. He ultimately decides to return home.
24	24	"Silly Moods"	Sarah Lloyd	Adam Bohorquez & Taylor Curry	October 28, 2023	124	0.13
24	24	"Chatterley vs. Chatterley"	Quinn Scott	Thomas Hudson	October 28, 2023	124	0.13
Silly Moods: Kiff and Barry have silly moods during a school field trip to the Table Town Museum and try to suppress them so they don't get thrown out. They eventually realize that their silly moods can disappear on their own. Chatterley vs. Chatterley: Kiff and her family have a family court with Judge Judgey, with her father on trial for eating her mother's slice of pizza. While Kiff herself was the culprit, she tries to hide the truth, but at the expense of her father getting a lifetime pizza ban. Prompted by this, she comes clean. It turns out to be a trick to get Kiff to be honest, and she is punished by having to make pizza for everyone.
25	25	"Hungee Squirrel"	Koby Agyeman	Allyson Gonzalez	November 4, 2023	125	0.12
25	25	"The Foreverangees"	Claytia Gonsalves	Miyako Molinelli	November 4, 2023	125	0.12
Hungee Squirrel: Kiff and her family go to a restaurant they like, and Kiff is memed for her facial expression when she eats. She doesn't want to be remembered for it, and when it seems to become history, the owners of the same restaurant build a new restaurant and reveal they tricked Kiff into signing a contract disguised as a kid's activity paper, allowing them to use her image and disallowing her to do so. In retaliation, she and her fans trick them into signing another contract under the restaurant to counter it, much to the owners’ dismay. The Foreverangees: Kiff and Barry accidentally set off a curse that results in everyone arguing and getting petrified. They end arguing themselves but manage to break the curse.
26	26	"Snow More Ketchup"	Hannah Jost	Brian Muelhaupt & James Sugrue	November 11, 2023	126	0.06
26	26	"Kiff and Barry Go to Prom"	Kent Osborne	Thomas Hudson	November 11, 2023	126	0.06
Snow More Ketchup: A snowstorm has hit Table Town and when the storm worsens, Roy Fox allows everyone into his mansion until the storm subsides and makes fries for everyone. Unfortunately, everyone is out of ketchup and Candle reveals that her father keeps his own stash of ketchup, so Kiff and her friends go to find it. Barry struggles to contain himself and starts hallucinating. Eventually, they find the ketchup and fight Roy for it, resulting in the entire mansion getting flooded with ketchup. Kiff and Barry Go to Prom: Trevor tells Kiff and Barry about the high school prom involving two individuals that had a misunderstanding, so they infiltrate the area and discover the confusion. After Kiff and Barry get kicked out by Principal Secretary, they go to the boy who was heartbroken after Terri used him to increase her social media following. They explain to him that she wasn't dumping him but explaining that she couldn't text him. After that, Kiff goes back in and encourages everyone to be with who they wanted to be with.
27	27	"Kiff Is Good at Sports"	Claytia Gonsalves	Allyson Gonzalez	January 20, 2024	127	0.08
27	27	"Mushroommates"	Quinn Scott	Taylor Curry	January 20, 2024	127	0.08
Kiff Is Good at Sports: Kiff is shown to be good at discus after she accidentally signs herself up along with Barry, thinking it was a discussion club. However, she ends up forgetting about the book report after spending so much time in sports. Despite this, she still receives an A due to her success in discus. She decides to help out the team one more time in exchange for receiving an F for not completing her book report. Mushroommates: Kiff and her father weed the backyard, but they procrastinate to do the part behind their shed. As a result, it is overrun by an invasive species of mushrooms and they try to get rid of them but with no success. Kiff's mom finds out, but scientists want to study the mushrooms. They leave eagerly after Kiff welcomed them to stay.
28	28	"Principal Helen"	Koby Agyeman	James Sugrue	January 27, 2024	128	0.11
28	28	"Dial B for Butt"	Sarah Lloyd	Miyako Molinelli	January 27, 2024	128	0.11
Principal Helen: Helen becomes principal after Principal Secretary takes a vacation. Kiff and Barry get suspicious about it and while it seemed Helen cared about the school, she was really trying to get cast as a principal in a movie and plans on selling the school to Roy Fox. Seeing this, Kiff and Barry try to get Principal Secretary to come back but is seemingly enjoying his vacation to the point of not wanting to leave. However, he does show up and is offered the role to star in the movie instead but refuses and is content with his job. Dial B for Butt: Kiff and her mom receive a random call and initially intend to trace its origin, suspecting it came from Kiff's mom's professor. However, with the assistance of an agent, they discover it was actually Reggie, whom they apologize to, him revealing it was all just part of a game.
29	29	"Fun Uncle Pat"	Kent Osborne	Taylor Curry	February 3, 2024	129	0.10
29	29	"Kiff Escape!"	Hannah Jost	Thomas Hudson	February 3, 2024	129	0.10
Fun Uncle Pat: Uncle Pat comes for a visit, but Martin is not happy about it, and he starts taking up Kiff's room. As it turned out his girlfriend kicked him out of the apartment they shared together. Thanks to Kiff he got the job of assisting the captain and gets a sticker for his case. Kiff Escape!: Kiff and her friends want to go to an escape room, so while Helen goes shopping, she decides to transport them to one on her computer. They attempt to escape multiple times, at the risk of having their memories wiped. Eventually, thanks to Trevor, they succeed in getting out.
30	30	"Beach Day"	Quinn Scott	Miyako Molinelli	February 10, 2024	130	0.09
30	30	"Sun's Out Buns Out"	Sarah Lloyd & Claytia Gonsalves	Allyson Gonzalez	February 10, 2024	130	0.09
Beach Day: The Chatterleys and Barry go to the beach and have their own adventures. Kiff wants to savor her French fries, but they get stolen by a little seagull girl. Beryl reencounters her old volleyball rival and tries to beat him in a game. Martin gets stuck buried in the sand and is unable to get out. Sun's Out Buns Out: For the last day of the school year, Barry invites his friends to his pool, but Terri and her friends occupy it. She tells Barry she will allow him to use the pool if he learns how to swim or else he will have to serve them watermelon all summer. Barry's childhood fear of a pool monster gets in the way, but it turns out to be a result of a prank Terri once pulled on him. He learns how to swim and wins the right to play in the pool with his friends.

=== Specials (2024–26) ===
"The Haunting of Miss McGravy's House" and "Lore of the Ring Light" were both produced as episodes for the second season, and "The Screamwriter" and "The Oddest Sea" for the third season, but released as standalone specials.

No.	Title	Written by	Storyboarded by	Original release date	U.S. viewers (millions)
31	"The Haunting of Miss McGravy's House"	Nic Smal & Lucy Heavens	Allyson Gonzalez & Brett Muller	October 5, 2024	0.12
When Kiff, Barry, and their friends discover that their favorite hangout area, Miss McGravy's house, is being sold by Lance Contract, they risk their Halloween trying to haunt the house to scare away the buyers. The gang later discovers that the house is haunted by two ghosts, who reveal how they also want to keep the house and scare away Lance and the buyers.
32	"Lore of the Ring Light"	Kent Osborne	Allyson Gonzalez & Taylor Curry	January 21, 2025	0.08
In a parody of The Lord of the Rings, a ring light holding the power to bring attention to its users' social pages – and corrupt its user in their quest for clout – resurfaces, and Kiff, Barry, and their friends set out to destroy it by throwing it into a volcano before anyone can harness its power. The group is threatened by Terri and Helen, seeking the Ring Light's power for themselves. But the group is also threatened by Kiff herself, despite her indifference to social media.
61	"The Screamwriter"	Lucy Heavens, Nic Smal, & Kent Osborne	Adam Bohorquez & Allyson Gonzalez	October 6, 2026	N/A
With the help of Kiff and Barry as consultants, Roy Fox makes a movie adaptation of "Trevor's Rockin' Halloween Bash", but the two are worried about Scarm Scaremly's potential return. Soon, their fears are realized, and Kiff and Barry now needs to escape Scarm's nightmare and get to the Tabletonians before Scarm takes them all to his realm to party.
62	"The Oddest Sea"	TBA	TBA	December 1, 2026	TBD
A parody of Homer's Odyssey, done in the vein of the 2026 film adaptation.

=== Season 2 (2025) ===
No. overall	No. in season	Title	Written by	Storyboarded by	Original release date	Prod. code
33	1	"Kiff Has to Sneeze"	Quinn Scott	Allyson Gonzalez	March 15, 2025	201
33	1	"Never Meet Your Mailboxes"	Sarah Lloyd	Taylor Curry	March 15, 2025	201
Kiff Has to Sneeze: When Kiff is about to sneeze but gets interrupted by Barry observing Glarbin getting locked out of the library, she becomes poor in things she is normally skilled at. Due to this, she and Barry try everything to get the sneeze out but fail. Helen offers to help and transports Barry into Kiff's mind to locate and release the sneeze. Though Barry is hesitant to observe as he blames himself doing so earlier for causing Kiff's predicament, he eventually manages to use his observational skills to release the sneeze and get Kiff back to normal in time. Never Meet Your Mailboxes: Movie star Chubbles Wubbington is instructed to act angry and mean towards his subjects, Kiff and Barry, for his new movie, but the two are unaware of his plan. Kiff and Barry meet with Nana Chubbs (Chubbles' mother) for information on his childhood, thinking that something happened in his past that is causing him to be who he is now.
34	2	"The Other Movie"	Koby Agyeman	Adam Bohorquez	March 15, 2025	202
34	2	"Roy-alty Check"	Claytia Gonsalves	James Sugrue	March 15, 2025	202
The Other Movie: When Kiff, Barry, and Trevor enter a theater but do not like the movie presented, they sneak into another. However, mayhem arises when Trevor uses the emergency exit instead of the bathroom and gets trapped there and Kiff and Barry constantly have to move their seats during previews. Roy-alty Check: Following on from the events of "Blooper Quest", Kiff receives a check for "ten-thousand smackers", her share of the profits from her film Found in Ambiguity, but her parents, who need certain parts of the house repaired, try to persuade her to lean toward one of them. Kiff later gets irritated when the persuasion gets repetitive, especially after they interrupt her class with a song, and decides to just split the money between her two parents. However, it's revealed that her check was actually for 28 nuts, and that "ten-thousand smackers" was actually just the amount of kisses that she wanted to put on it.
35	3	"Stramded"	Hannah Jost	Brett Muller	March 22, 2025	203
35	3	"Hairstory"	Kent Osborne	Allyson Gonzalez	March 22, 2025	203
Stramded: Kiff and her classmates board the aerial tramway, which suddenly gets stuck mid-way. Kiff tries to talk the others not to lose their minds but can't help when they have very little to eat. Hairstory: When Kiff's visit to the hair salon only lasts a few minutes, she thinks Harriet Trimble did a poor job and therefore tries to cover herself. Barry tries to help and the two return to the salon to confront Harriet.
36	4	"Lights Out"	Quinn Scott	Taylor Curry	March 22, 2025	204
36	4	"Dinner at Barry's"	Sarah Lloyd	James Sugrue	March 22, 2025	204
Lights Out: When the lighthouse keeper feels unappreciated despite receiving a visit from Kiff and Barry, he turns off the power in all of Table Town. Kiff and Barry try to revive the power but all of their attempts fail, forcing them to get all the Tabletonians to show the lighthouse keeper how much they care for him. However, this simply reminds the lighthouse keeper that he took his job because he hated being around so much people and turns on the power after telling them all to get lost. Dinner at Barry's: Kiff dislikes the "glooperole" Barry's mother makes, but is afraid to tell her the truth. She later finds out that Barry and his siblings also hate the glooperole and they all, except for Kiff, decide to confess. However, the truth is eventually dragged out of Kiff as well when she is put through a lie detector test, which leads Mrs. Buns to admit that she also hates her glooperole and only kept making it because she thought her kids loved it.
37	5	"Taily"	Claytia Gonsalves	Adam Bohorquez	March 29, 2025	205
37	5	"Cocina Island"	Koby Agyeman	Brett Muller	March 29, 2025	205
Taily: Kiff runs for class president against Mr. RiPeppa, who's only running to win a new ergonomic chair. Kiff starts a campaign which only gains recognition thanks to her joke-making tail, whom she nicknames Taily. Instead of Kiff, the whole school votes for Taily and it becomes the new class president, before transitioning its role over to Kiff. Cocina Island: In a parody of The White Lotus, the Chatterleys and Barry go on a vacation to an island hotel, however Kiff thinks there's something shady about Barry and that their friendship is in jeopardy. The reason is due to Barry's constant disappearance during the night and the melting of several ice sculptures, which isn't helped by the hotel manager Rhonda's claim that something similar happened with her ex-best friend. However, it's revealed that Barry was just sneaking out to learn how to play the piano so that he could thank the Chatterleys for taking him along and that the "sabotaged" ice sculptures actually just melted in the island's hot climate, causing Rhonda to realize that her ex-best friend was never at fault for her own previous "incident" and call her to apologize and make up.
38	6	"Up All Night"	Quinn Scott	Adam Bohorquez	April 5, 2025	207
38	6	"Rotten Banana"	Hannah Jost	James Sugrue	April 5, 2025	207
Up All Night: Kiff and Barry plan to stay up all night in an attempt to see the rare once-in-a-lifetime passing by of a comet. However, they have trouble staying awake and resort to many different methods, which ends them up missing the comet when the sun begins to rise. Rotten Banana: An old banana suddenly comes to life and grows a hero worship to Kiff, wanting her all to herself. Because of this, she tries to get rid of Barry and anyone else who comes her way. Eventually, Kiff falls into the banana's trap of keeping her hostage, prompting Barry and her parents to rescue her.
39	7	"OTDR"	Kent Osborne	James Sugrue	April 12, 2025	209
39	7	"Good Morning Table Town School"	Sarah Lloyd	Taylor Curry	April 12, 2025	209
OTDR: Kiff is ready to be out the door, ready for a big event, but her parents and Barry are unprepared. They soon get distracted by numerous things, but in the end, finally get out the door - but they leave the tickets they need behind. Good Morning Table Town School: Bored with Principal Secretary's bland, by-the-numbers morning announcements at school, Kiff and her friends take things into their own hands by launching their own hip, fresh, and exciting morning announcement series that makes waves across the whole school. However, the show's heavy reliance on opinion over fact drives the school into chaos, and Kiff, realizing that facts rule all, ultimately pleads with Principal Secretary to restore his bland announcements.
40	8	"Wiz Ed"	Koby Agyeman	Brett Muller	April 19, 2025	212
40	8	"Mystery Spell"	Claytia Gonsalves	Adam Bohorquez	April 19, 2025	212
Wiz Ed: A wizard named Ed offers to teach magic to the kids at their school. After learning basic skills, the kids seemingly trick Ed into teaching them spells that they can then use for chores. But then Ed reveals that he knew all along, and that a wizarding rule means the kids have to pay all the allowances they earned doing the chores to Ed. They turn to Helen for help, but instead use their own spells to overwhelm Ed with sponges. Mystery Spell: Annoyed by Barry's hand-farts, Helen casts Spell #134 on Kiff and Barry, and then won't tell them what it is. Kiff and Barry go through a long list of possible effects, beg Helen to explain the spell, and turn to her sister Agnes for help. But they never identify the spell, and decide that the spell is defective and won't do anything. Or will it?...
41	9	"Trash Clumpers"	Hannah Jost	Allyson Gonzalez	April 26, 2025	211
41	9	"Wiff & Larry"	Quinn Scott	Taylor Curry	April 26, 2025	211
Trash Clumpers: Kiff and Barry become park cleaners in order to prevent the place from being closed. Wiff & Larry: When Trevor participates in an activity where students' stories will be published, he writes one featuring a hero based on himself, and villains based on Kiff and Barry.
42	10	"Helping People Feels Good"	Kent Osborne	Adam Bohorquez	May 3, 2025	210
42	10	"Dinner with Darryn"	Sarah Lloyd	James Sugrue	May 3, 2025	210
Helping People Feels Good: After Kiff's good deed is upstaged by Reggie's after he helped an undercover journalist cross the road, she attempts to undermine the impact of his good deed. Dinner with Darryn: Kiff and Barry have dinner at a fancy restaurant with their shy and polite classmate, Darryn, to celebrate his birthday - only for Kiff and Barry to come across a kid planning to celebrate her birthday twice.
43	11	"Spoiled Again"	Koby Agyeman	Allyson Gonzalez	June 7, 2025	211
43	11	"Much Ado About Muffin"	Claytia Gonsalves	Brett Muller	June 7, 2025	211
Spoiled Again: Kiff becomes highly interested in Star Star Throne Quest. Much Ado About Muffin: Helen sells muffins which prove to be quite popular.
44	12	"Arrested Dehelenment"	Hannah Jost	Taylor Curry	June 14, 2025	212
44	12	"Here Comes the Wedding Episode"	Quinn Scott	James Sugrue	June 14, 2025	212
Arrested Dehelenment: Due to a bill being unpaid for several years, Helen loses her magical powers. Here Comes the Wedding Episode: The Pone and Cherry Berry are getting married, and the Chatterleys are asked to take roles in the wedding.
45	13	"Rock Kick"	Nic Smal	Adam Bohorquez	June 21, 2025	213
45	13	"The Macaroni Affair"	Sarah Lloyd	Brett Muller	June 21, 2025	213
Rock Kick: Kiff and Barry become obsessed in trying to kick a pebble all the way home, but find themselves kicking it all over Table Town. The Macaroni Affair: Kiff and Barry suspect Sweepy Steve is selling children’s art for personal profit.
46	14	"Kiff and Barry Save Halfway There Day"	Kent Osborne	Allyson Gonzalez & Taylor Curry	June 28, 2025	214
When the feeling that Centaur Claus will not come to Table Town for Halfway There Day sets in, Kiff and Barry pay him a visit.
47	15	"Kristophe's Big Day Out"	Koby Agyeman	Adam Bohorquez	July 5, 2025	215
47	15	"Annoying, Freaky, Cool"	Claytia Gonsalves	James Sugrue	July 5, 2025	215
Kristophe's Big Day Out: Kiff and Barry take Kristophe to a show to meet their toddlerhood mascot idol Little Ouchie Boo Boo. Annoying, Freaky, Cool: When Kiff finds out Billiam thinks she is annoying, she takes it deeply and decides to make serious amends to herself.
48	16	"A Troll Through the Woods"	Quinn Scott	Allyson Gonzalez	July 12, 2025	216
48	16	"Big Coat"	Hannah Jost	Brett Muller	July 12, 2025	216
A Troll Through the Woods: Kiff and Barry accompany Trollie when he visits his magical hometown, Wicker Woods to retrieve Trollie's beloved childhood doll, Count Eyebrows. Big Coat: The Chatterleys shop at Okay Will for some new winter coats.
49	17	"The Tower on Trevor"	Kent Osborne	James Sugrue	July 19, 2025	217
49	17	"Friends on Line"	Sarah Lloyd	Taylor Curry	July 19, 2025	217
The Tower on Trevor: The students of Table Town School start building a tower by stacking objects on Trevor who actually enjoys it. Friends on Line: Kiff, Barry, and Terri come to the mall because a popular new book is on sale.
50	18	"Martin Waxed the Floors!"	Kent Osborne, Quinn Scott, & Claytia Gonsalves	Adam Bohorquez	July 26, 2025 (Note: This episode was first released on Disney+ on July 23, 2025.)	218
50	18	"Juice Break"	Koby Agyeman	Brett Muller	July 26, 2025	218
Martin Waxed the Floors!: Kiff and her friends invent a new sport. Juice Break: Secretary Prince and Kiff accidentally break Principal Secretary's beloved juice machine.
51	19	"Stories Before Snories"	Nic Smal	Allyson Gonzalez	August 2, 2025	TBA
51	19	"Is Patty a Baddie?"	Hannah Jost	Taylor Curry	August 2, 2025	TBA
Stories Before Snories: Kiff can't sleep and asks her parents to tell her a bedtime story. Is Patty a Baddie?: Miss Deer Teacher's class is having a science fair and Kiff and Barry suspect Patty Hoot stole their idea.
52	20	"Slippery Slopes"	Quinn Scott	Lucyola Langi	August 9, 2025	TBA
52	20	"Of B&B's and Piano Keys"	Sarah Lloyd	Brett Muller	August 9, 2025	TBA
Slippery Slopes: The Chatterleys are invited by the Raconas, to come to a weekend ski trip at Slippery Slopes; both Beryl and Martin hope to make good impressions with Rachel and Robby. However, before they could all go skiing, a snowstorm has begun, forcing everyone inside; Beryl and Martin join Rachel and Robby to the hot tub at the balcony, while Kiff is inside with Reggie. Attempts to talk and interact with Reggie end up awkward as she realizes the only times she has talked with him was within their friend group. Kiff and Reggie build a fort but ends up arguing over how they should build it. Kiff notices the adults enjoying themselves in the hot tub and enjoys them, but she is unable to relate to their conversations. Back inside, Kiff tells Reggie he is the reason behind the awkwardness and that his presence is actively ruining the vacation, escalating to a fight that ends with Reggie storming into his room and Kiff's exasperated gasps causing an avalanche. Recalling events between them in the past (with her flashback containing moments from "Fresh Outta Grandmas", "Helping People Feels Good", "Martin Waxed the Floors!", "Kiff's on a Plane", "Kiff Has to Sneeze", and "The Haunting of Miss McGravy's House"), Kiff decides to reconcile with him, while Reggie himself almost recalls past events between him and Kiff before being interrupted by the latter. Knowing both parties are in the wrong, the tension between the two dies down, and work together to rescue their parents from the snow. Kiff and Reggie realize both are similar: both are two only children with "big opinions and take-charge attitudes". The two help themselves to the hot tub, while the adults are back inside, relaxing by the warmth of the fireplace. Of B&B's and Piano Keys: Kiff and Barry visit Trevor's house on the pretext of there being a solar eclipse that is only visible from his backyard. He soon comes clean that he needs help with a financial problem: he has been using the money his mother has been giving him for years to instead buy "B&B's Minis" at the park - and that his mother expects him to perform a piano concerto fundraiser later to raise money for bathroom repairs. After an attempt to stream piano music off a speaker is foiled by ads, with Trevor unable to upgrade to an ad-free plan, the trio visit the music store of Trevor's music teacher, who admonishes and chases Trevor for running his store out of business. Trevor tries out self-playing player pianos, but it plays the wrong piece. Defeated, the three go back to Trevor's house, but hears piano playing coming from Renée's house - she is proficient at piano-playing, but has stage fright that keeps her from playing pianos in public. Renée agrees to hide and play the piano for Trevor while he mimes it, while Barry grabs all the B&B's wrappers. Trevor is able to proficiently mime the concerto, but Renée pops out the piano, declaring that her stage fright is cured. The ruse blown right open, Trevor confesses he never took piano lessons, leaving his mother heartbroken. However, she sees the renovations Barry has performed, amazing her and the others: he has replaced everything that appears old with laminated, recycled B&B's wrappers. Trevor's mother praises her son, not knowing it was actually Barry who did all the work. Trevor's promise to start trombone lessons is immediately thrown into the wayside in favor of yet another B&B Mini's binge.
53	21	"Ye Olde Candy Shoppe of Horrors"	Lucy Heavens & Nic Smal	Adam Bohorquez & Allyson Gonzalez	October 4, 2025	221
After a run-in with unruly teenagers, Kiff, Barry, and Kristophe are out of candy on Halloween night, leaving a kid displeased; with all the shops closed, they go to a candy shop whose tenant sends them back to the past, 200 years ago. After witnessing the same kid from earlier, Little Crumble Smallsmith, be heckled for his large bloomers, the two turn to a younger Helen for help; she gives the kid his trick-or-treat experience. Running into two Time Goblonoids who Kiff, Barry and Kristophe tried to outrun in the pretext of them killing the three, the two clear the confusion up by telling them they seek to return people back to their own time. Back in the present, the tenant is revealed to be the kid from the past, now named Old Crumb, and dies peacefully knowing the three gave him friendship. As night falls once more, Kiff and Barry enlist the help of the Time Goblonoids to scare the unruly teenagers.
54	22	"PS You're Fired"	Claytia Gonsalves	Taylor Curry	October 11, 2025	222
54	22	"Weird Delivery 2: Return to Pretendo Time"	Kent Osborne	Katie Graziano	October 11, 2025	222
PS You're Fired: Kiff and Barry are in charge of organizing Principal Secretary's mail when they receive a phone call from his mother telling him he apparently fired her. To make it up to her, Principal Secretary hires her, but she continually embarrasses him to the point she has usurped his position as principal. Since schools cannot have two principals, he conspires with Kiff and Barry to "promote" her to "super principal", though he soon reveals through a musical number that despite loving her, he will fire her - something she fully understands, as she did not want to be principal. Weird Delivery 2: Return to Pretendo Time: Kiff and Barry are idyllically watching TV as an ad for the virtual reality game Pretendo Time appears, enticing the two to go to Reggie's to play it. Through a modified version of Pretendo Time titled Reggie's World, Kiff and Barry relive the first time they played Pretendo Time (Note: As depicted in "Weird Delivery".) This leads the two to believe everything is a simulation; spurred by that, they go around town doing whatever they want. They stop at a group of teenagers performing a jump into a pool of water, and promise to them they would do the jump. Shortly afterward, they ask Reggie to create a simulation of the jump; now realizing that everything is not a simulation, they attempt to call off the jump, but end up doing it anyway... and end up floating. This is revealed to be a simulation in Reggie's World, which also ends up being a simulation in of itself within Pretendo Time.
55	23	"Next Year's Musical"	Hannah Jost	Adam Bohorquez	October 18, 2025	223
55	23	"Troubles Wubbington"	Koby Agyeman	Brett Muller	October 18, 2025	223
Next Year's Musical: After the events of the previous year's musical My Fair Helen where he is depicted as "stingy", (Note: Depicted in "The Sound of Helen") Principal Secretary allows Helen full creative control over this year's, complete with a large budget - as long as his portrayal is much more favorable than the previous musical. She immediately gets to work, but the only things she has written in the script is that Principal Secretary is "not stingy." The kids (and Mr. RiPeppa) tell Helen their ideas ("Musical Medley"), only for her to eject them (literally in Kiff and Barry's case) from her room. With them gone, Helen, intending on dropping the niceties, breaks into song ("I Don't Feel Nice"), only to be interrupted by Principal Secretary, who wishes her luck. Facing herself, she imagines a scenario where she is booed for not being the actor-director she dreams she is. Buckling under stress, she finally breaks down... later, she comes to, having fallen asleep, and during rehearsals, she admits she has nothing but "PS NOT STINGY" and breaks down. The kids confess ("Something to Confess") they have not only recreated her room on stage, but they helped with the entire production - and Helen was on stage the whole time. After being given her flowers, a shocked Helen can only utter one word: "What?!" Troubles Wubbington: Kiff and Beryl give Martin his Father's Day presents: Beryl gives him food, while Kiff gives him "Jaw Chewers", which give him a sculpted jaw. It is perfect timing that renowned actor Chubbles Wubbington has disagreed with the salary for Roy's upcoming movie Jaw and Order - one look at Martin, and he is selected as the perfect replacement. At the studio, Roy literally throws Chubbles out his trailer, dropping him, literally, out of Jaw and Order. Kiff offers to search for a job for him, eventually landing on a mailman. Back at the studio, Martin immediately begins to act like a diva, while Chubbles has delivered no mail and is travelling around Table Town instead to the point he gets fired; despite everything, Chubbles tells Kiff he finds happiness in acting. Feeling bad for him, she attempts to get him back in the production; Kiff's attempts to bribe Roy with a boombox fails due to Martin making a scene in the studio; his jaw has reverted back to normal (in reality Roy breaking the Jaw Chewers). As Kiff and Martin leave the studio, Roy tearfully reunites with Chubbles, much to the confusion of the motion capture actors. Some time later, Jaw and Order is released, with Chubbles' face green-screened into Martin's.
56	24	"Uncle Pat in Charge"	Quinn Scott	Allyson Gonzalez	October 25, 2025 (Note: This episode did not air in its usual 10 a.m. slot on Disney Channel; instead, a rerun of "Silly Moods"/"Chatterley vs. Chatterley" was mistakenly broadcast, with both segments incorrectly labeled as new. The episode aired as scheduled on Disney XD and later premiered on Disney Channel on October 29, 2025.)	224
56	24	"Fab Fourteen"	Sarah Lloyd	Taylor Curry	October 25, 2025	224
Uncle Pat in Charge: Kiff's fun Uncle Pat arrives to babysit her and Barry while Martin and Beryl are out for the former's clown school reunion. Immediately, things get off to a boring start as Pat plays the playbook a little too safe, restricting Kiff and Barry from doing fun stuff (also causing a small drop of bleach to be spilled while attempting to wash Beryl's wedding dress, and also accidentally dyeing Kiff's fur red) - to the point he has wrapped the two in bubble wrapping and has deflated a basketball. As evening falls, the three find out their living room has been "Glamdalized" - with criminals replacing their older furniture with glamorous equivalents. Despite Pat's protests, the three enter an abandoned warehouse that is home to the "glamdals", only to fail their mission (with a side of yPads). Pat reveals that Kiff's grandma, Rose, bought the same pieces of furniture for Pat to ensure equality when Martin got married. The three set off to restore the Chatterley living room back to normal as Martin and Beryl return, with the only remaining object being "glamdalized" being Martin's favorite remote. Fab Fourteen: Barry's cousin Rodney visits Table Town, despite him not knowing the latter all his life. Barry is set to plan Rodney's "Fab Fourteen", i.e. a birthday party that occurs when one turns fourteen. Mary attempts to jolt her son's memories with Rodney, but Barry remains unknowing. Kiff and Barry are told the party should revolve around Rodney's journey from "hunk" to "punk", but, even after a visit to private investigator Jackie Pennidötter (who actually stole the pictures of young Rodney from Barry's room), can only muster up two central themes: "buckets" and "slides". Indeed, the two make do with what they have, throwing a bucket and slide-themed party, complete with song; Rodney is dissatisfied with the party and throws a fit. Kiff confronts Rodney, until Harry walks past him, addressing him as his "bucket bro". Now putting two and two together, Barry admonishes his mother for getting him and Harry mixed up; Rodney goes off to hang out with Harry.
57	25	"So Fluffy"	Kent Osborne	Adam Bohorquez & Eddie West	November 1, 2025	225
57	25	"Oh, Brother"	Koby Agyeman	Brett Muller	November 1, 2025	225
So Fluffy: Kiff, Barry, Reggie and Trevor are invited to Candle's mansion for the debut of her new music video, "Backpack", which no one appears to like. After noticing that the Fox mansion has a private recording studio, the five are immediately struck with an idea: to make a hit song. After their first attempts fail, Little Louis, who has arrived at the Fox mansion to deliver Roy's Louiscopters, walks in on a recording attempt, praising their toilet paper for being "so fluffy." Clipping Louis' praise, the kids integrate it to their new music video, titled "So Fluffy", which immediately becomes a smash hit - to the point every single song before the publication of "So Fluffy" to be buried at the dump. Feeling awful, and with the moment passed, Kiff and Barry turn to a known hater of "So Fluffy" to derail its popularity: Helen, who has been stuck in a "So Fluffy"-induced artist's block, to the point everything she attempts to perform ends up resulting in the same ditty, over and over again. The two bring her to a live performance of "So Fluffy", where it is revealed the spell she will be using is simply hitting everyone in Table Town with a lead pipe to make them forget the song. Soon, the song's popularity crashes all the way down: someone not only points out that Reggie's guitar is not connected, but the entire inspiration from the song came from Louis praising the toilet paper. With the song now all but a passing fad, the music industry in Table Town returns back to normal, and the crew start to rock out to the music they love (Candle's requests for reviews on her music video remains unanswered). Oh, Brother: Trevor's college-aged older brother, Hobart "Hoby" Angstrom, returns to Table Town. Trevor warns Kiff and Barry about how weird his brother is, but the two pass it off and immediately hit it off with him. While watching Four Is a Crowd at a cinema, Trevor notices Kiff, Barry, and Hoby's extended absence, attributed to them goofing off when raindrops fall on their head. Indeed, Four Is a Crowd shares a nearly-identical plotline to Trevor's plight; he is disdained he is being left out, and that his brother is hogging Kiff and Barry all to himself. After the movie, Kiff, Barry, Trevor and Hoby notice that a raffle to win a three-seater tandem bicycle, as used in Four Is a Crowd. Hoby enters the raffle; Trevor sneaks away, a plan formulated (right in front of Kiff and Barry). The two realize that they are ignoring Trevor to spend time with Hoby. Hoby wins the raffle, but is soon greeted by a taller Trevor (really him on stilts). He confronts his older brother on stage and attempts to break his glasses, but he fails to. Dejected, Trevor walks away, and Kiff and Barry confess the truth on stage... then Hoby himself tells the two that he is just hanging out with them, as they are mutual friends with Trevor. Meanwhile, the aforementioned Trevor attempts to get a ticket to "Antbarctica", but is told to walk all the way there. Fantasies aside, Hoby reunites with Trevor, who tells him he does not know Kiff's name, and wanted to spend time with his cool younger brother. He gives one of his sunglasses to Trevor as a parting gift, and he, Kiff, and Barry ride off into the sunset on the triple-seater... only to crash it.
58	26	"Don't Leave B Hangin'"	Kent Osborne & Quinn Scott	Adam Bohorquez	November 8, 2025	226
58	26	"Thunderstorm Game Night"	Hannah Jost	Allyson Gonzalez	November 8, 2025	226
Don't Leave B Hangin': A regular day for Kiff and Barry at the Chatterley abode is upended with the announcement that two astronauts, Rex and Goldie Crispo, are heading to space to rescue Slim Pickins' mascot, Slimmy P (who has been floating aimlessly in space ever since the end of Episode 13b "Weekly Grocery Shop"). Kiff and Barry are interested and head over there, where one of the astronauts, Goldie, high-fives Kiff, but leaves Barry hanging because of time constraints. Kiff and Barry seek help from Dr. Lyon, who gives them a card for his wife Regina's support group for people left hanging (Pawva has both hands up due to being left hanging by twins). Regina adjourns the meeting early as no one has questions (everyone's hand being raised gives her the impression that everyone has a question). Kiff and Barry turn to Glarbin for help, who patches the two in with the astronauts. Barry sings a song about being left hanging, but the two astronauts did not catch it due to signal disruptions, leaving Barry distraught now that he is stuck in that position. Kiff decides she will not give up, and leads construction of a rocket with Barry. However, just as he is about to launch, he finds out both keys have to be locked from the inside. With the mission cancelled, Kiff and Barry are witnesses to Slimmy P coming in hot and high-fiving Barry; given that Goldie has high-fived Slimmy P while in space, by proxy, she has high-fived him. However, his arm does not budge. Fifty years later, Goldie and Rex return to a futuristic Table Town, with an older Kiff and Barry waiting for them. When Goldie prepares to return the favor, Barry pulls his hand away, and he, Kiff, and Goldie all share a laugh. It is then revealed that the entire episode is being told, in the distant future, by an older Glarbin to his young nephew. Glarbin puts the episode's events into ambiguity by telling his nephew that some said that the story either never happened, somehow happened twice, or that "Barry's joke was so hilarious, it sent the two friends back in time and reset their timeline to normal." He leaves his nephew to sleep. Thunderstorm Game Night: It is a dark and stormy day at the Buns house, where Kiff has settled in for the moment. As the storm echoes on, the other Buns exchange looks; every stormy day, the Buns play a Monopoly-esque board game titled Head of the Table that makes everyone very competitive, to the point the Buns restricted play only to stormy days. Kiff is none the wiser to the effects the game has on the Buns, and opts to play, but the arguments begin even early on, with everyone arguing about what piece they get to play; Kiff defuses the argument and gives everyone a piece. Kiff is immediately imbued with a three-turn skip, but Barry comforts her and gives her the benefit of the doubt, as it is her first time playing. However, the second card she draws has her take six nuts from Barry (the player to her right), Harry has Barry move back two spaces, and Terri invites everyone else, including Kiff, to a table for four, leaving Barry upset... but acting rather oddly to the point Kiff has to retrieve Barry from the nearby closet herself. After admonishing his mother for not fully reading a card that forces her to skip a turn, Barry lands on City Hall and goes crazy competitive, banishing everyone but Kiff to the Garden of Worms. Kiff is shocked by her best friend's behavior, as Barry calmly has everyone take a snack break. During said break, Kiff, disturbed by Barry's behavior and not wanting to make him sad, attempts to leave the game, but Barry tells her that Head of the Table is best played by people with spines, and that with everyone else but Kiff eliminated, now it is one head, "and one butt." With the other Buns in shock, the storm intensifying, and Kiff enraged, she decides to play the game to the end; she quickly becomes the Head of the Table, wrestling the advantage away from Barry, who now needs to roll a six to stay in the fight. Kiff admits to him that while she does not understand the game, taunts him by telling him if he indeed rolls a six, she will never talk to him again, and should he not, he will go back in time and prevent them from being friends. The other Buns shocked to their cores and the stakes higher than ever, Barry rolls the decisive roll, but the dice falls underneath a nearby chair; as he and Kiff frantically try to lift the chair up to find out what he rolled, the storm clears up, suspending the game. With the stormy skies gone, everyone heads outside to play; it is revealed that the dice did not roll a number and has been stuck on the edge the whole time.
59	27	"No Thank You"	Kent Osborne	Taylor Curry	November 15, 2025	227
59	27	"Love Ed"	Koby Agyeman	Eddie West	November 15, 2025	227
No Thank You: After overhearing a group of high schoolers boasting that they could throw an awesome party, Kiff and Barry offer to pitch in. However, party organizer Danny Wibbon appears to be pushing the two (and apparently, later Trevor too) into doing all the house chores - and without a hint of gratitude either (he says "rock and roll"). Further, Kiff notices that Danny has not been thanking them; wanting to see gratitude from their seniors, she and Barry go the extra mile and serve milkshakes; indeed, Danny thanks them for their service. However, Kiff had been imagining that, and Danny, instead of thanking the two, directs everyone to give their trash to them. As the party winds down and Kiff and Barry are reduced to trash clumpers, Danny remains without gratitude for the two, but two guests, Ben and Vanilla, thank Kiff and Barry for their additions. Kiff and Barry, mad at Danny, gives him an ultimatum - one thanks, and they would not only take the trash to the dump, but they would visit and do it all again at Danny's next party. Danny begins to fumble saying his catchphrase; having lost all patience by this point, Kiff and Barry leave him hanging. Back at the Chatterley home, Beryl, noticing the kids' bad moods, give them ice cream; after remarking that gratitude would be appreciated, Kiff and Barry thank her and share a laugh with her. Danny, in bed and now unable to say his catchphrase, is joined by Trevor, who tells him he does not need Kiff and Barry, but only him. Love Ed: Following on from the events of "Wiz Ed", perennial magic-using scammer Ed returns to Table Town, head-over-heels for Helen after having watched a video of her online. He asks Kiff and Barry to help him make his hints at love work; however, Helen is oblivious to the fact Ed is attempting to woo her. This comes to a head when Kiff and Barry, having trailed Helen, has Ed admit his crush on him right to her face by singing her a song which she eventually joins in on. Later that night, the two visit Café Penguino to have dinner, where Ed snaps at Helen and runs back to the tram station. After chasing him through town, and after Cherry Berry stops the tram (due to being a hopeless romantic), Helen stops Ed from leaving, and gives him the keys to her apartment. However, that would be her downfall, as she returns to her apartment, which is now trashed, and Ed having feigned his love for her the whole time in order to get closer to her; he did so to steal a pair of magical shorts from her chest of magical stuff. Fully knowing Ed had been deceiving her from the very start, Helen reveals she posted that video of her wearing the shorts to reel Ed back into Table Town and uses a spell to make the shorts return to her, with Ed stripped down to only a box and without any money, so he cannot ride the tram back home.
60	28	"Souvenir Money" (Part 1)	Sarah Lloyd	Brett Muller	November 22, 2025	228
60	28	"Kiff Loses Barry" (Part 2)	Quinn Scott	Adam Bohorquez	November 22, 2025	228
Souvenir Money: For the last day of the school year, Kiff and Barry announce that they will be going on a road trip to Old Punctual, a geyser which is known for erupting on time. Everyone is enamored about the souvenirs the two will get while there, so everyone at school entrusts Kiff and Barry with their money (500 nuts) so they can get the souvenirs. After almost running into a thief who attempts to take some of the money for himself, Kiff and Barry purchase two sets of lockboxes and a keychain for them. However, Kiff immediately loses the keys, and Barry the lockbox; they turn to Jackie Pennidötter once more, who offers to find the lockbox at the beach the Chatterleys and Barry were at the previous summer. (Note: As depicted in the season one episode "Beach Day") Kiff is able to retrieve the keys from underneath a pipe drain, but the lockbox is lost to a griffin who takes it and the keys for its home. Adding insult to injury, the two are unable to retrieve either item. They meet up with Jackie once more, who has found a pirate's chest full of golden doubloons (worth 250 nuts per coin); they are able to purchase the souvenirs from a discount souvenir shop and are ready to go to Old Punctual. Kiff Loses Barry: Directly continuing from where "Souvenir Money" last left off, the Chatterleys and Barry (who is wearing a mosquito net hat that Mary made Him wear before going with the Chatterleys to Old Punctual) go to Old Punctual. Martin tells the kids he wanted to throw a keychain with his name on it in his youth, only to be interrupted by two older kids. Once they arrive, Martin, who has changed his mind after seeing a sign encouraging people to keep the geyser clean, accidentally throws the keychain into the geyser, which rips apart and starts blowing out of new holes on the ground. Kiff and Barry are separated during the chaos, but are soon reunited. However, on the way back home, Kiff realizes she took a very similar-looking blue mouse that looks strikingly similar to Barry from the neck downward, leaving Kiff panicking. The family turns around and returns to the geyser, but finds nothing. The park ranger tells them Barry must have hitched a ride with a country/folk band called the Shoeshiners, and the Chatterleys have accidentally picked up their roadie, Jerry Jo. Kiff and Barry, longing for each others' presence, begins to sing as each side goes to locations the other has already visited, but had already left, with hints on the trail - including a paper airplane from Barry, his footprint on an oil stain at a gas station, and his picture at a big boot attraction; the trail leads the Chatterleys to a motel, where reception tells Kiff her friend has already checked in. However, she gets her hopes high for nothing as she encounters Jerry once more, leaving her broken-hearted, disappointed in herself, and on the verge of tears; Barry is also left crushed, and the band he has been with is about to perform. She immediately notices the sound of music and goes to investigate, but finds herself stuck in a sea of people. However, she is saved by Barry, who pulls her up to the stage and reuniting as she, the Chatterleys, Barry, and everyone else (including the park ranger) sing the Shoeshiners' new song, "I Will Always Find You" (which also nets them a record deal with Flam Banjo). As the Chatterleys head back home to Table Town, Kiff and Barry, tuckered out and exhausted for the night, sleep peacefully on each other's arms.

== Shorts ==
A shorts compilation special titled Kiff's Animal Kingdom premiered on April 6, 2024 as part of the Shorts Spectacular series. The special follows Kiff presenting a presentation of the animals of Disney Channel through Chibi Tiny Tales, Theme Song Takeover, and How NOT to Draw shorts for her classroom science project.

=== How NOT to Draw (2023–25) ===
A series of shorts where a certain character from a Disney property, mainly a Disney Channel show, would usually do certain shenanigans as they request from the animator or the artist.

No.	Title	Original release date
1	"How NOT to Draw: Kiff"	April 22, 2023; July 2, 2023 (Halfway There Day version)
When Kiff is drawn into real life, she wants to have fun with a strict animator, teaching him how to "loosen up".
2	"How NOT to Draw: Helen and Principal Secretary"	March 8, 2025
When Helen is drawn into real life, she constantly tries to stop the animator from drawing Principal Secretary.
3	"How NOT to Draw: Barry"	November 21, 2025
When an animator draws Barry, he wants to get to know him better, which leads the latter to put him through his BFF test.

=== Chibi Tiny Tales (2023–26) ===
Chibi Tiny Tales is a series of shorts that depict characters from various Disney Channel properties in chibi-style animation. In June 2023, the series began releasing shorts based around Kiff. Most shorts are crossovers with two or more Disney Channel series. Chibiverse, a spinoff to Chibi Tiny Tales, where Kiff characters usually appear in, is one example of crossovers.

No.	Title	Original release date
1	"Super Slide"	June 10, 2023; July 2, 2023 (Halfway There Day version)
Bored with the park's mediocre water slide, Kiff pours mineral oil on herself to take sliding to the next level.
2	"Toilet Flood Pool Party"	June 17, 2023; July 2, 2023 (Halfway There Day version)
When the Chatterleys' air conditioner breaks down, Kiff and Barry use the bathroom's toilet to create a swimming pool right inside the house, with disastrous results.
3	"Shock and Claw"	September 9, 2023
Kiff dives down deep under an arcade's claw machine and meets a troublemaking troll who steals the machine's stuffed animals.
4	"Bounce House"	March 16, 2024
Kiff and Barry explore a bounce house, which belongs to a family of humanoid balloons.
5	"Froyo Frenzy"	April 6, 2024 (TV premiere); July 21, 2024 (YouTube premiere)
Kiff and Barry compete to build the tallest frozen yogurt cone.
6	"That's So Tandem"	June 22, 2024
Kiff and Barry explore all the things they can do together in two's.
7	"Witches Night Out"	September 7, 2024
Helen invites Luz Noceda from The Owl House and Dae from Zombies: The Re-Animated Series to a fun evening around town.
8	"Forbidden Flying Discs"	October 19, 2024
When Kiff and Barry's flying disc lands in the tree of a spooky forest, Kiff sets out to retrieve it.
9	"Friendsgiving Fiasco"	November 2, 2024
Kiff throws a Friendsgiving (her version of Thanksgiving) dinner for her friends, but can't get a folding table to stay open.
10	"Hot Cocoa Craze"	December 14, 2024
Kiff makes a fresh cup of hot cocoa, but when everyone in Table Town wants a sip of it, Kiff finds a way for everyone to have some.
11	"Don't Go Snow Friends"	December 21, 2024
When Helen brings Kiff and Barry's snowpeople to life, they try to find a cold shelter for them when they begin to melt.
12	"Worm Wars"	April 19, 2025
At the arcade, Kiff has a dance-off with a worm.
13	"Helen Hunt"	September 29, 2025
When Helen makes Emperor Belos from The Owl House drop his smoothie, he vows to get revenge.
14	"Kiff 'n Dale: Chibi Rangers"	March 27, 2026
When Chip from Chip 'n Dale: Rescue Rangers is out sick for the day, Kiff Chatterley steps in to help Dale and the rest of the Rescue Rangers. But is she a good fit for the team?

=== Broken Karaoke (2023–25) ===
An infrequent series that has Disney Channel characters singing parodies of existing songs. Part of the Broken Karaoke series that was started by fellow Disney Channel series Big City Greens. Most shorts are crossovers with two or more Disney Channel series.

No.	Title	Original release date
1	"Born to Be Strange"	July 29, 2023
In a parody of "Born to Be Brave" from High School Musical: The Musical: The Series, Tilly Green from Big City Greens sings a song to encourage people to be who they are. Kiff briefly appeared in the song, dancing while Tilly and Barry chant her on.
2	"Squirrels Just Wanna Have Fun"	March 2, 2024
When the class is unable to have recess due to the rain, Kiff decides to pass the time by singing a parody of "Girls Just Want to Have Fun" by Cyndi Lauper with Barry, Helen, and Principal Secretary. Secretary doesn't feel in the mood to join until he realizes the pleasures of having fun.
3	"I Will Be a Superstar"	November 23, 2024
In a parody of "Life Is Sweeter" from Descendants: The Rise of Red, Helen, along with LaCienega Boulevardez from The Proud Family & Louder and Prouder, Bucky Buchanan from Zombies: The Re-Animated Series, and Dewey from DuckTales sing and try to steal the spotlight from each other.
4	"Squirrel in My Pants"	January 21, 2025
In a parody of "Squirrels in My Pants" from Phineas and Ferb, Kiff wants to build a lasting fanbase like Dr. Doofenshmirtz and attempts this by stealing his pants to "truly know him", much to Doofenshmirtz's dismay. She later steals all his clothes when she feels she's not getting the "full Doof experience".

=== Theme Song Takeover (2023–25) ===
As part of a promotional campaign, Disney Channel began airing the Disney Theme Song Takeover wherein supporting characters from different shows performed the theme song to the series they were in. A few shorts are crossovers with two or more Disney Channel series.

No.	Title	Original release date
1	"Kiff Ensemble"	December 23, 2023
Barry, Candle, Principal Secretary, and Helen ask to be in Kiff's theme song. However, they each mess up during the sequence and decide not to be in Kiff's theme song after all.
2	"Kiff Takes Over the Disney Channel"	April 1, 2024
Helen creates a potion to take over the theme songs of other Disney Channel shows, but accidentally uses it on Kiff, who finds herself stuck in a montage of Disney Channel, Disney XD and Disney Afternoon shows' theme songs, including, in order of appearance, Phineas and Ferb, Big City Greens, Kim Possible, Amphibia, Star vs. the Forces of Evil, Hamster & Gretel, Gravity Falls, DuckTales, The Owl House and Chip 'n Dale: Rescue Rangers.
3	"Doof Takes Over Kiff"	September 28, 2024
Dr. Doofenshmirtz from Phineas and Ferb enters Kiff's world via a portal and takes over her theme song with his "Doof-inator", which can turn anyone into his likeness. Before he is about to conquer another universe, Perry the Platypus comes in and reverses the machine, turning everyone back to normal. For revenge, Helen drops a piece of Kiff's fur into the juice of a blaster that turns Doof into the latter's likeness.
4	"Kiff Takes Over Kiff"	July 26, 2025
When Kiff is told to take over her own theme song, Barry helps her perform a singing cover of the song.
5	"Witches Beyond Waverly Place"	September 27, 2025
When Helen is upset that she was never cast in Wizards Beyond Waverly Place despite being a witch, she takes over the show's theme song to prove she belongs on it.

=== Random Rings (2024) ===
Short segments that originated from Big City Greens that feature Disney Channel characters or celebrities calling one another.

No.	Title	Original release date
1	"Kiff Calls Kylie Cantrall"	October 4, 2024
Kiff and Barry call Kylie Cantrall from Descendants: The Rise of Red and request to play antagonist roles in the Descendants franchise. Cantrall wants people who can sing and dance, and Helen shows the former her dance moves. Cantrall accepts them and promises to put them in the next Descendants movie.

=== Road Trip (2025) ===
A shorts series centered on Kiff, Barry, Candle, Helen, and the rest of the school group going on a school field trip led by Principal Secretary to visit a history museum. The shorts are a loose follow up to a similar shorts series from Big City Greens. Following their YouTube release, Disney Channel and XD would air the shorts during a marathon titled The Round and Round Road Trip with Kiff.

No.	Title	Original release date
1	"Field Trip Blues"	February 9, 2025
Principal Secretary takes Kiff, Barry, and the students of Table Town Middle School to Historical Chairsburg, the longest living history museum, much to the students' boredom.
2	"Roundabout"	February 9, 2025
Principal Secretary gets stuck in a roundabout while on the road, causing Barry to feel nauseous.
3	"Outta Gas"	February 16, 2025
When the school bus runs out of gas, Principal Secretary discovers that Helen is using it to power her hair dryer.
4	"What's That Smell?"	February 23, 2025
When a nasty smell enters the school bus, Kiff becomes a detective to determine who's the culprit behind it.
5	"Historical Chairsburg"	March 2, 2025
The students finally make it to Historical Chairsburg only for Principal Secretary to discover that it has been changed from a museum to a theme park.

=== Cartoonified! with Kiff (2026–) ===
No.	Title	Original release date
1	"Jackson Olson"	October 10, 2026
Jackson Olson from the Savannah Bananas joins Kiff and Barry for a game of Turnip Ball, a Table Town sport that features an epic dance battle against Helen!
