= Children's and Family Emmy Award for Outstanding Animated Special =

American children's TV award

- Awarded for: Outstanding Animated Special
- Country: United States
- Presented by: Academy of Television Arts & Sciences
- First award: 2022
- Currently held by: Ultraman: Rising (2025)
- Website: theemmys.tv/childrens/

This is a list of winners and nominees of the Children's and Family Emmy Award for Outstanding Animated Special, which honors animated programs both in broadcast and streaming television aimed at young viewers from age six to fifteen. The category was established at the 1st Children's and Family Emmy Awards in 2022 under the name Outstanding Special Class Animated Program and the category's name was changed to current one, the subsequent year.

The inaugural recipient of the award was Netflix special Hilda and the Mountain King. The current holder of the award is the Netflix special Ultraman: Rising, which won at the 4th Children's and Family Emmy Awards.

== Background ==
On November 17, 2021, the NATAS announced the creation of the Children's and Family Emmy Awards to recognize the best in children's and family television. The organization cited an "explosive growth in the quantity and quality of children’s and family programming" as justification for a dedicated ceremony. Many categories of the awards were previously presented at the Daytime Emmy Awards. Animated programming aimed towards children was honored from 1985 to 2021 with the Daytime Emmy Award for Outstanding Children's Animated Program. Following the establishment of the Children's and Family Emmy Awards, this award was discontinued.

== Winners and nominations ==
=== 2020s ===
Year	Series	Producers	Network	Ref
2022 (1st)	Special Class Animated Program			
2022 (1st)	Hilda and the Mountain King	Kurt Mueller, executive producer; Luke Pearson and Stephanie Simpson, co-executive producers; Andy Coyle and Bryan Korn, supervising producers; Steve Jacobson, Chantal Ling and Rachel Simon, producers; Emerald Wright-Collie, associate producer; Victor Reyes, line producer	Netflix	
2022 (1st)	El Deafo	Cece Bell, Sara Bottfeld, Clint Eland, Claire Finn and Will McRobb, executive producers; Martin Quaden, line producer	Apple TV+	
2022 (1st)	Hotel Transylvania: Transformania	Selena Gomez, Michelle Murdocca and Genndy Tartakovsky, executive producers; Alice Dewey Goldstone, producer	Prime Video	
2022 (1st)	Maya and the Three	Jorge R. Gutierrez, executive producer; Silvia Olivas and Jeff Ranjo, co-executive producers; Tim Yoon, producer; Lilly Sechrist, line producer	Netflix	
2022 (1st)	Trollhunters: Rise of the Titans	Guillermo del Toro, Marc Guggenheim, Dan Hageman, Kevin Hageman and Chad Hammes, executive producers; Jaena Sta. Ana, line producer	Netflix	
2023 (2nd)
2023 (2nd)	Animated Special			
2023 (2nd)	Marvel's Moon Girl and Devil Dinosaur: Moon Girl Landing	Laurence Fishburne, Steve Loter and Helen Sugland, executive producers; Rodney Clouden, supervising producer; Pilar Flynn, producer; Jeffrey M. Howard and Kate Kondell, co-producers; Rafaael Chidez, line producer; Lisa Muse Bryant, consulting producer	Disney Channel	
2023 (2nd)	Looney Tunes Cartoons: Bugs Bunny’s Howl-O-Skreem Spooktacular	Pete Browngardt and Sam Register, executive producers; Alex Kirwan, supervising producer; Rebecca Palatnik, producer	HBO Max	
2023 (2nd)	Reindeer in Here	Greg Erb, Jonathan Koch, Phil Lafrance, Jamie Leclaire, Kyle MacDougall, Steve Michaels, Brent Montgomery, Jason Oremland, Adam Reed, Lino DiSalvo and Sander Schwartz, executive producers; Tracey Blagdon and Victoria Coulthart, supervising producers; Leslie Thomas, producer	CBS	
2023 (2nd)	Rise of the Teenage Mutant Ninja Turtles: The Movie	Andy Suriano and Ant Ward, executive producers; Vladimir Radev, line producer; Tony Gama-Lobo and Rebecca May, consulting producers; Tanya Melendez, associate producer	Netflix	
2023 (2nd)	Snoopy Presents: Lucy's School	Stephanie Betts, Paige Braddock, Anne Loi, Amir Nasrabadi, Josh Scherba, Craig Schulz, Bryan Schulz and Cornelius Uliano, executive producers; James Brown, producer; Logan McPherson, creative producer	Apple TV+	
2023 (2nd)	The Wonderful Summer of Mickey Mouse	Paul Rudish, executive producer; Philip M. Cohen, producer	Disney+	
2024 (3rd)
2024 (3rd)	Orion and the Dark	Bonnie Arnold, and Walt Dohrn, executive producers; Peter McCown, producer; Ashley Laidlaw, line producer; Sean Charmatz, director; Charlie Kaufman, writer; Kristin Brennerm, associate producer	Netflix	
2024 (3rd)	Merry Little Batman	Sam Register, executive producer; Andres Salaff, supervising producer; Rebecca Palatnik, producer; Morgan Evans, story by / screenplay by; Jase Ricci, screenplay by; Mike Roth, executive producer / director / story by	Prime Video	
2024 (3rd)	Peter and the Wolf	Bono, Patrick Brennecke, James Stevenson Bretton, Amy Friedman, Ollie Green, Kim Howitt, Benjamin Lole, Alistair Norbury and Stuart Souter, executive producers; Lucy McPhail, coordinating producer; Adriana Piasek-Wanski, producer; Gavin Friday, line producer	HBO Max	
2024 (3rd)	Snoopy Presents: One-of-a-Kind Marcie	Stephanie Betts, Paige Braddock, Logan McPherson and Josh Scherba, executive producers; James Brown, senior producer; Angela Belyea, line producer; Raymond S. Persi, director; Bryan Schulz, Craig Schulz and Cornelius Uliano, executive producers / teleplay by; Betsy Walters, written by	Apple TV+	
2024 (3rd)	The Tiger's Apprentice	Carlos Baena, Maryann Gargerand and Kane Lee, executive producers; Bob Persichetti, Sandra Rabins and Jane Startz, producers; Raman Hui, director; David Magee and Christopher Yost, writers;	Paramount+	
2024 (3rd)	Tiny Chef’s Marvelous Mish Mesh Special	Ozlem ‘Ozi’ Akturk, Kristen Bell, Alex Bulkley, Corey Campodonico, Leah Gotcsik, Brian Grazer, Ron Howard, Rachel Larsen, Adam Reid and Morgan Sackett, executive producers; Michael Kaufman, co-executive producer; Sara Crowley and Jason Wyatt, line producers; Rob Shaw, director	Nickelodeon	
2025 (4th)
2025 (4th)	Ultraman: Rising	Kei Minamitani, Masahiro Onda and Takayuki Tsukagoshi, executive producers; Tom Knott and Lisa M. Poole, producers; Marc Haimes, writer; Shannon Tindle, writer and director; John Aoshima, co-director	Netflix	
2025 (4th)	An Almost Christmas Story	Antonio Canobbio, Parry Creedon, Ben Kalina, Chris Prynoski, Shannon Prynoski, and Lila Rawlings, executive producers; Jeanette Jeanenne and Lauren Siller, line producers; Brooke Zachanowich, co-producer; Gabriela Rodriguez, produced by; David Lowery, produced by / directed by / screenplay by; Alfonso Cuaron, produced by / story by; Jack Thorne, screenplay by / story by	Disney+	
2025 (4th)	Kiff: The Haunting of Miss McGravy’s House	Antonio Canobbio, Ben Kalina, Chris Prynoski, and Shannon Prynoski, executive producers; Kent Osborne, co-executive producer; Marcy Pritchard, supervising producer; Matt Burns, line producer; Allison Craig, director; Lucy Heavens and Nic Smal, executive producers / written by	Disney Channel	
2025 (4th)	Kiff: Lore of the Ring Light	Antonio Canobbio, Lucy Heavens, Ben Kalina, Chris Prynoski, Shannon Prynoski, and Nic Smal, executive producers; Marcy Pritchard, supervising producer; Matt Burns, line producer; Allison Craig, director; Kent Osborne, co-executive producer / written by	Disney Channel	
2025 (4th)	That Christmas	Bonnie Arnold, Lara Breay, Rebecca Cobb, Mary Coleman, Natalie Fischer, Colin Hopkins, Julie Lockhart, Elisabeth Murdoch, and Sarah Smith, executive producers; Nicole P. Hearon and Adam Tandy, producers; Peter Souter, writer; Simon Otto, director; Kapil Sharma, animation director; Richard Curtis, executive producer / writer	Netflix	
