= Kiff (TV series) =

American-South African animated television series

- Genre: Musical; Buddy comedy; Adventure; Slice of life
- Created by: Lucy Heavens; Nic Smal
- Developed by: Kent Osborne
- Directed by: Allison Craig
- Voices of: Kimiko Glenn; H. Michael Croner
- Theme music composer: Nic Smal; Brad Breeck
- Opening theme: "Kiff Main Title Theme" (written by Nic Smal, Brad Breeck, and Lucy Heavens)
- Ending theme: "Kiff End Credit Theme" (written by Nic Smal)
- Composer: Brad Breeck
- Countries of origin: United States; South Africa
- Original language: English
- No. of seasons: 3
- No. of episodes: 61 (113 segments) (list of episodes)

Production
- Executive producers: Nic Smal; Lucy Heavens; Chris Prynoski; Shannon Prynoski; Antonio Canobbio; Ben Kalina
- Editors: Greg Condon; Bea Walling; Greg Buracker
- Running time: 22 minutes
- Production companies: Titmouse, Inc.; Disney Television Animation

Original release
- Network: Disney Channel (Note: Premieres simulcasted with Disney XD.)
- Release: March 10, 2023 – present

Kiff (Note: South African slang for "cool") is an animated musical buddy comedy television series created by Lucy Heavens and Nic Smal and produced by Disney Television Animation in association with Titmouse, Inc. It follows the lives of two friends, Kiff Chatterley, an anthropomorphic orange squirrel, and Barry Buns, an anthropomorphic blue rabbit, who find themselves in various shenanigans around the fictional city of Table Town. The series debuted on March 10, 2023, on Disney Channel, and received positive reviews from critics for its humor and animation.

The show was renewed for a second season in June 2023, which premiered on March 15, 2025. The show was renewed for a third season in February 2025, ahead of the second season's premiere.

== Synopsis ==
Set in Table Town, a mountainous island surrounded by anthropomorphic animals, things, objects and magical and mythical creatures, the series centers on the adventures of a young, orange, and happy-go-lucky anthropomorphic squirrel named Kiff, whose best intentions often lead to complete chaos, and her best friend Barry, a sweet and blue rabbit. The two take the island by storm with their endless adventures and zest for life.

== Characters ==
=== Main ===
- Kiff Chatterley (voiced by Kimiko Glenn) is a young and orange squirrel who is the title protagonist of the series. She sometimes tends to be reckless, but is thankfully never afraid of being responsible and standing up for what she believes in. She is the only child of the Chatterley family. She is a student of Table Town Middle School.
- Barry Buns (voiced by H. Michael Croner) is a sweet and blue rabbit who is Kiff's best friend and sidekick. He is the third child of Buns family.

=== Recurring ===
==== The Chatterley family ====
- Martin Chatterley (voiced by James Monroe Iglehart) is Kiff's absent-minded father who loves popcorn and orange juice and he works as a less-than-successful inventor.
- Beryl Chatterley (voiced by Lauren Ash) is Kiff's mother and Martin's wife, who works as a college professor.
- Pat Chatterley (voiced by Andy Merrill) is Martin's younger brother and Kiff's paternal uncle who lives in a condo, rides a motorcycle and works as a cruise director. For the longest time, Martin did not enjoy Pat's presence, only starting to warm up to him after he treated the Chatterleys and Barry to a free cruise.
- Tom Chatterley (voiced by James Monroe Iglehart) is Kiff's grandfather and Martin's father.
- Rose Chatterley (voiced by James Monroe Iglehart) is Kiff's grandmother and Martin's mother.

==== The Buns family ====
- Mary Buns (voiced by Rachel House) is Barry's warm and kind mother. She speaks with a New Zealand accent.
- Harry Buns (voiced by Josh Johnson) is the eldest child of Buns family and Barry's older brother. Who is an aspiring DJ. Professionally, he goes by the name DJ 11:30.
- Terrence (Note: In "Thunderstorm Game Night", Barry refers to her as Terrence Buns, revealing that to be her full name.) (Terri) Buns (voiced by Nichole Sakura) is the second child of Buns family and Barry's older sister and Harry's younger sister. Who is a social media influencer and has a job as a pizza deliverywoman. Professionally, she goes by the name Terri 2-Bowls.
- Kristophe Buns is Harry, Terri and Barry's younger brother and he is the youngest child of the Buns family. He is usually seen with Farley, a toy robot that once belonged to Harry. As a baby, he does not speak.

==== Kiff's crew ====
- Reggie Racona (voiced by Eric Bauza) is a nerdy but loyal gray, black, and white raccoon in Kiff and Barry's class who is experienced with technology. In "Fresh Outta Grandmas", he is revealed to have two moms, revealed in "Slippery Slopes" to be named Rachel and Robby, who both have two moms who are both divorced. He aspires to be a video game programmer, as shown in "Weird Delivery" and "Weird Delivery 2: Return to Pretendo Time". He is also a member of a secret society that congregates in a cave alongside Glarbin, Liz K., and an unnamed gerbil, as shown in "Harry's Maturity Crisis". "Slippery Slopes" reveals that he and Kiff have known each other since they were toddlers, and that despite being friends with her, he has not interacted much with her outside their friend group.
- Renée du Bedat (voiced by Mary Mack) is a raspy-voiced female brown warthog in Kiff and Barry's class who has an eye for the arts. She is skilled at acting, playing the piano, and beat poetry.
- Candle Fox (voiced by Vella Lovell) is a popular and rich sassy female red fox in Kiff and Barry's class, Roy's daughter, and formerly Kiff's frenemy. In "Two Truths and a Bunny", Candle is revealed to be the leader of her own group called the "Abras" (a pun on candelabra). Her parents are also divorced, as revealed in "Fresh Outta Grandmas".
- Trevor Angstrom (voiced by Tom Kenny) is a socially deprived brown and tan hedgehog in Kiff and Barry's class, whose desire for friendship makes him antagonistic in certain episodes. He befriends Candle in "Friendship in the Time of Cheese Caves", and is revealed to have an older, college-aged brother named Hobart (nicknamed Hoby).

==== Table Town Middle School staff ====
- Principal Princy Secretary (voiced by Nic Smal) is a South African-accented secretary bird who is the principal at Kiff and Barry's school. He aspired to be a principal ever since he was in high school. He, Glarbin Gloobin, Sweepy Steve, and Ms. Moufflé have their own group called "The Table Town Riddler's Society." Despite being a male, he has feminine-looking eyes.
- Helen (voiced by Lucy Heavens) is an eccentric, selfish, sassy, and egotistical 400 (Note: In "Personal Assistant", Helen is indicated to be around 400 years old. Before changing it, her age was listed as 712 per her faculty ID in "Big Barry on Campus". By "Ye Olde Candy Shoppe of Horrors", she has lived in Table Town for over 200 years.)-year-old green witch who knows magic spells and is Kiff and Barry's drama teacher. Her ego can thrust her into antagonistic roles.
- Miss Deer Teacher (voiced by Deedee Magno Hall) is a 33-year-old fallow deer who is Kiff and Barry's teacher. She used to be a stand-up comedian before she became a teacher. She still unironically plays with dolls and stuffed animals whenever she's at home.
- Mr. RiPeppa (voiced by Eric Bauza) is a somewhat unprincipled striped skunk and teacher who loves sleeping and sandwiches. When not teaching a class, he serves as an announcer in sporting events held at the school.
- Miss Tulane (voiced by Lucy Heavens) is a German-accented unicorn who is the school's art teacher. She wears white boots and a pink scarf.
- Sweepy Steve (voiced by Kent Osborne) is the janitor bug (presumably he is a fly) who performs janitorial duties at Table Town Middle School. At the beginning of each episode, (Note: Except "Kiff Has to Sneeze", "Stories Before Stories", and "Weird Delivery 2: Return to Pretendo Time", where it is already on the billboard.) he is shown pasting an advertisement on the same billboard as the episode title. He is a member of "The Table Town Riddler's Society" and has been shown to have a love for musical theater. In "Life on the Inside," he is seen running detention. He is prone to suddenly falling asleep under sunbeams. He is always seen accompanied by a broom.
- Secretary Prince (voiced by Eugene Cordero) is an orange-haired satyr who works as the secretary to Principal Secretary. He often carries around a computer resembling panpipes and is obsessed with unicorns.

==== Other Table Town Middle School students ====
- Billiam (voiced by Eric Bauza) is a young male blue Billy goat who wears a jacket in Kiff and Barry's class. He is best friends with Candle and part of her group, the Abras.
- Patty Hoot (voiced by Sophie Kim) is a young female light yellow parakeet with glasses in Kiff and Barry's class. She loves books and is a kind, soft-spoken and anxious girl. She also has the ability to fly. She only has two speaking appearances throughout the show: "Totally Table Town" and "Is Patty a Baddie?", the latter episode giving Patty her first major appearance.
- Gareth (voiced by Tom Kenny) is a stoic grey hyrax (or a glacier bear) wearing a black T-shirt and one of Kiff's classmates. He so far only spoke in two episodes.
- Darryn Gherkinheim (voiced by Tom Kenny) is a neurotic and shy yellow and brown reticulated giraffe in Kiff's class. He is rather mature for his age, owning his own credit card and dining at a fancy restaurant.
- Snekole is a green snake with a blue baseball cap in Kiff and Barry's class; unlike the others, he doesn't really talk and is mostly silent, although he has yet to have a voice actor.
- Liz K. is a dinosaur girl who mostly does not speak like Snekole and is often seen as a background character. Her only speaking appearance to date is "Dial B for Butt", where she is heard saying Dee and Kim's names, but she, like Snekole, does not have a voice.

==== Other recurring and minor characters ====
- The Five Pigeons of the Acapellapocalypse (Bad Boy, Meathead, Mystery Lad, Nice Guy, and Party Girl) are a group of harmonizing yet destructive pigeons that were trapped inside five figurines by Helen's great-great-great-grandmother in the early 20th century. They were released after Kiff unknowingly collects all five figurines, which were scattered across Table Town, leading to them causing another destructive rampage. However, they end up trapped once more, this time inside a mansion, and are filmed by Roy Fox for his reality TV series The 5 Jerks!.
- Roy Fox (voiced by Eric Bauza) is Candle's father who is the president of Foxhole Productions, as well as a TV producer for reality TV shows such as Table Town Has Talent, Table Town's Cringiest Wannabes, The 5 Jerks!, and Dancing on the Tables.
- Miss Moufflé (voiced by Aparna Nancherla) is a giraffe librarian who runs the local library in Table Town. She takes her duties as a librarian seriously, particularly when it comes to maintaining silence in the library. She regularly shushes noisy library patrons, and considers the library's soundproof "hush room" to be her "happy place". She, Principal Secretary, Glarbin Gloobin, and Sweepy Steve have their own group called "The Table Town Riddler's Society."
- Pawva Mugg (voiced by Katie Crown) is a marten who is the town's barista.
- Agnes (voiced by Kate Flannery) is Helen's sister and her complete opposite who runs a magic-powered dry-cleaning service.
- Trollie (voiced by Rhys Darby) is a green troll who lives under the town's bridge and tells riddles to people who attempt to pass. Growing up in the magical Wicker Woods, he moved to Table Town after graduating high school, but he felt guilty about leaving his mother behind to the point of having recurring nightmares. He speaks with a New Zealand accent.
- Glarbin Gloobin (voiced by Steve Little) is a frog who is the de facto mayor of Table Town and runs the city's lost and found. He values doing a lot of paperwork before applying an action. He, Principal Secretary, Sweepy Steve, and Miss Moufflé have their own group called "The Table Town Riddler's Society".
- The Pone (voiced by Eugene Cordero) is an alpaca with yellow leggings who lives next door to the Chatterleys. Martin claims to like him despite often shooing him away from certain affairs, only coming around during his wedding. He met Cherry Berry at the tram station while Kiff and the crew were stuck, and asks her out on a date before she can restart the tram. The Pone would go on to marry her in "Here Comes the Wedding Episode".
- Cherry Berry (voiced by Eric Bauza) is the operator for the town's old aerial tram that the crew get trapped in. Before she can restart the tram and get the kids to safety, the Pone asks her out on a date. The two later get married in "Here Comes the Wedding Episode".
- Gordon (voiced by H. Michael Croner) is a sphynx cat who offers free samples to grocery shoppers. He used to be ageist, refusing to serve children. However, his perspective on children changes when he is struck by Helen's spell, which was originally intended for Beryl. Despite his small stature, Gordon is quite strong; he once single-handedly carried a delinquent hare twice his size, who was trying to eat all his samples. Besides offering free samples, Gordon is also a cashier.
- The Wall of Goat (voiced by Nic Smal) are a herd of ancient, white mountain goats with brown and grey horns who possess telepathic abilities and live on a wall in the Outskorts of Table Town. The Wall make themselves available to anyone seeking answers or advice regarding any matter; they also have a son named Little Louis, who once visited Kiff's school but left to fulfill his career as an airplane designer.
- Dr. Lyon (voiced by Kent Osborne) is a lion who is Table Town's resident doctor. He is very handsome and shown in a dream sequence to be married to a beautiful lioness, revealed to be named Regina in "Don't Leave B Hangin'". They have a son, Kyle, who is a popular student at Table Town High School and friends with Terri Buns and Michaela Oats.
- Michaela Oats (voiced by Mary Mack) is a teenage horse and a student at Table Town High School. She is known to give a long, dramatic, scrutinizing side eye (along with long, dramatic music) when she is skeptical of someone. Michaela also loves blowing pink bubble gum.
- Danny Wibbon (voiced by H. Michael Croner) is a teenage, blonde-haired yak - a student at Table Town High School, he tends to say "rock and roll" while making the finger fun gesture. He is a family friend of Michaela Oats', and is the heir to the fortune of the family ribbon business.
- Rat (voiced by H. Michael Croner) is a naive grey rat who runs a store that sells hats and mattresses. He wears a patterned wizard hat, a bowtie, and two mats on his feet.
- Ghost Wolf (voiced by H. Michael Croner) is a mysterious but artistic white wolf with an eerie-looking ghostly form who is seemingly scary but is actually revealed to be a bit protective and has a passion for painting. He resides in a cave.
- Chubbles Wubbington (voiced by H. Michael Croner) is an anthropomorphic tough-looking cyan mailbox. One of the celebrities of Table Town and a movie star, he is the titular character of a media franchise that Kiff and Barry are fans of, where he plays a fictional version of himself. He is one of the many few characters in the show to be an anthropomorphic object rather than an animal or mythical being.
- Owl Teacher is an unnamed owl who is teacher of Table Town High School and read various subject to his students.
- Flam Bingo (voiced by Gary Anthony Williams) is a flamingo and Table Town's preeminent brunch DJ agent who becomes interested in Harry as a potential client. He is muscular and dresses in chain necklaces and glasses.
- Nick Namé (voiced by Danny Pudi) is a teenage fairy who works as a manager of the Table Town Mall Cinema.
- Mrs. Angstrom (voiced by Mary Mack) is Trevor's mother.
- Beverly (voiced by Lauren Ash) is an Irish-accented pigeon who left Table Town after disappointing her neighbors with her home decorations that did not conform to the Halfway There Day tradition. She returned after Centaur Claus corrected the citizens on what the holiday was really about. She is fond of elegance and is skilled in volleyball.

==== Guests ====
- Kim Popularé (voiced by Vella Lovell) is a ring-tailed lemur who is Candle's friend. She used to study at Tuft Pierre, a private school mostly attended by affluent and insolent pupils, before transferring to Table Town Middle School. She, at first, spoke with a Swedish accent and went by the pseudonym Kennedy. But after Barry beats her in a game of identifying facts and lies, she disclosed her true name, and began speaking in an American accent.
- Scarm Scaremly (voiced by Andy Daly) is a blue candy-loving demon who Barry accidentally summons from a book after accepting a dare from Kyle Lyon, Michaela Oats, and Nick Namé. He has the power to transform people into the costumes they wear.
- Mav (voiced by Kent Osborne) is a young sheep in a black jacket and one of the few students sent to the detention room for delinquency. Kiff met him when she was sent to detention for standing in class trying to keep her classmates in their seats. When Kiff helps him and the other delinquents escape, they reform and become committed to their schooling.
- Roo (voiced by Shirley Henderson) is the leader of a colony of highly intelligent biting mushrooms, which also includes her father Cedric. As an invasive species, the biting mushrooms roam Table Town in search of new spaces to invade.
- Banana (voiced by Michaela Dietz) is a living, rotten banana who escapes from Helen's apartment and tries to keep Kiff to herself.
- Rhonda (voiced by Judy Greer) is the manager of the Cocina Island resort who accused her best friend of melting ice sculptures before realizing they all just melted due to heat.
- Granite Rockberg (voiced by Orville Peck) is a geologist who operates the Rock Hall of Fame.
- Centaur Claus (voiced by Ólafur Darri Ólafsson) is a magical centaur who is Table Town's very own Santa Claus and the representer of Halfway There Day (Table Town's version/equivalent to Christmas). Centaur Claus has many miniature horses for workers/assistants and carries around a magical trash can with him. He also has the ability to fly, and previously dated Helen.
- Baby New Year (voiced by Tim Heidecker) is a cute humanoid baby and the representer of New Year's Day who lives in a floating, clock-themed mansion at the Prime Meridian. He considers Halfway There Day an insult to New Year's Day. He can get very cranky and has a rivalry with Centaur Claus, having stolen his trash can.
- Little Louis (voiced by Thurop Van Orman) is a young goat who is one of the Wall of Goat's many kids who once went to school with Kiff. He somehow shares the same telepathic abilities as them but can't control his hive mind. He later left school to pursue his dream of being an airplane designer. Little Louis has also explored transporting others through helicopters, one being ordered by Roy Fox.
- Ed (voiced by Nic Smal) a short green wizard who is Helen's ex-husband and frenemy or enemy becoming a second drama teacher of the Table Town Students of Miss Deer Teacher's class and others.
- Rachel Racona (voiced by Ashly Burch) is a fox who is one of Reggie's mothers and the wife of Robby. She works as a neurosurgeon, and is, so far, the only Racona family member shown to not be a raccoon. According to Reggie in "Fresh Outta Grandma's", Rachel had two mothers who were both divorced.
- Robby Racona (voiced by Lucy Heavens) is a raccoon who is one of Reggie's mothers and the wife of Rachel. She is an actress who plays a neurosurgeon in a TV show (ironically, her wife is an actual neurosurgeon). According to Reggie in "Fresh Outta Grandma's", Robby, much like her wife, also had two mothers who were both divorced.
- Crumble Smallsmith (voiced by Michael Cusack) is the tenant of the Ye Olde Candy Shoppe establishment who goes by "Old Crumb" in the present day. For the longest time, he did not have any friends, growing bitter to the point a curse has formed, where people lured into the shop would be taken back 200 years ago to relive the events of the Halloween night he since dreaded. He passes away by the end of the episode, touched that he gained a friend in Kiff and Barry. He speaks in an Australian accent.
  - Little Crumble Smallsmith (voiced by Charley Rowan McCain) is a younger Crumble Smallsmith as he appeared 200 years ago. In the present day, he takes the form of a "time phantom" that lures people into his candy shop. He has large bloomers and, like his present-day counterpart, speaks with an Australian accent. For a majority of "Ye Old Candy Shoppe of Horrors", he is in a knight costume, but he loses the costume after being knocked down. He would be dressed up in a Chubbles Wubbington costume, some 200 years before Chubbles himself was born, by Kiff and Barry when trick-or-treating at a younger Helen's house.
- The Time Goblinoids (voiced by Eric Bauza and H. Michael Croner) are time bureaucrats who aim to return lost time travellers into their own times. While they appear hostile, they are actually friendly.
- Secretary Mom (voiced by Diane Morgan) is, as her name implies, Principal Secretary's mother. A secretarybird like her son, she was accidentally sent a letter stating she was fired; to make it up to her, he hires her as principal, but she embarrasses and usurps him to the point he, having had enough, fires her on the spot.
- Rodney (voiced by Tim Heidecker) is Barry's cousin who visits Table Town to celebrate his "Fab Fourteen". As a baby, he was put in a bucket with Harry so Mary can take a picture of the two, and in childhood, he was once stuck on a slide with a relative to the point the fire department had to free them both; both of these events were the inspiration for Kiff and Barry's bucket-and-slide-themed party.
- Jackie Pennidötter (voiced by Robby Hoffman) is a rat who operates a private investigating service.
- Hobart "Hoby" Angstrom (voiced by John Stamos) is Trevor's college-aged older brother.
- Rex (voiced by Kent Osborne) and Goldie Crispo (voiced by Katie Crown) are astronauts who are on a mission to retrieve lost mascots.
- Birthday Brian (voiced by Tom Kenny) is an enthusiastic dog who works as Cafe Penguino's birthday singer.

== Episodes ==
Season	Segments	Episodes	Originally released	
Season	Segments	Episodes	First released	Last released
Pilot			—N/a	—N/a
1	58	30	March 10, 2023	February 10, 2024
Specials			October 5, 2024	December 1, 2026
2	54	28	March 15, 2025	November 22, 2025
3	TBA	TBA	January 20, 2027	TBA

== Production ==
=== Development ===
In 2017, creators Nic Smal and Lucy Heavens first met each other when they were animators for Triggerfish Animation Studios, as the duo claimed that they 'spoke the same comedy language'. Conception for the series began in December 2017, and was eventually optioned by Disney five months later. On June 17, 2021, during the Annecy International Animation Film Festival, it was announced that Lucy Heavens and Nic Smal were developing the series, originally entitled Donk (later entitled Kiff). According to the duo, the series is inspired by their experiences growing up in Cape Town, while Heavens described it as a series "about a kid who lives with her parents and goes to school" whose comedy focuses on the world and characters featured. Senior vice-president for Disney Channel's animation Meredith Roberts said, "Lucy and Nic are a brilliant creative team who produced a fresh and funny series with vibrant visuals that help bring the friendship between a squirrel and a bunny to life in a unique way". The series is produced by Disney Television Animation and Titmouse, Inc., with Kent Osborne serving as co-producer and story editor, and Winnie Chaffee producing. It consists of 22-minute episodes, composed of two 11-minute segments. Edward Mejia, a Disney executive, oversees the series.

On June 13, 2023, Disney Television Animation announced that the series was renewed for a second season. In June 2024, a third season was announced, but officially confirmed by February 2025, ahead of the second season's premiere.

=== Animation ===
In addition to co-producing, Titmouse, Inc. also provides the animation for the series (with its overseas animation being provided by Yearim).

=== Music ===
Most episodes of Kiff have at least one musical number per episode. Brad Breeck produces the show's music. All soundtracks and singles were released by Walt Disney Records.

== Albums ==
=== Season 1 ===
Kiff: Season 1 (Original Soundtrack)

Soundtrack album by Cast – Kiff
- Released: June 30, 2023; May 3, 2024 (re-release)
- Recorded: 2023
- Genre: Soundtrack
- Length: 27:35
- Label: Walt Disney Records
- Producers: Nic Smal; Brad Breeck

Kiff: Season 1 (Original Soundtrack) is the soundtrack album for the first season of Kiff.

The album was first released under the title Kiff (Original Soundtrack) on June 30, 2023, with eight tracks. This marked the first release of the songs "Sweet Compromise" and "Things", whose parent episodes ("I Like to Move It!" and "You Can't Handle the Tooth!") would air later in the year.

Kiff: Season 1 (Original Soundtrack)
No.	Title	Performer(s)	Length
1.	"Kiff Theme Song"		1:28
2.	"Kids with a Calling"	Kimiko Glenn • H. Michael Croner • Josh Johnson • Nic Smal	3:00
3.	"Things"	Glenn • Croner	1:18
4.	"Don't Get Better Than This"	Smal	2:18
5.	"We Are Goat"	Smal	0:45
6.	"So Chunky"	Glenn • Vella Lovell	1:30
7.	"Sweet Compromise"	Glenn • Croner • Mary Mack	1:32
8.	"Got Character"	Glenn • Croner • Smal • Tom Kenny • Mack • Eric Bauza • Lovell • Lucy Heavens	4:30
9.	"The Scarm Song"	Andy Daly	1:57
10.	"Hungee Squirrel"	Smal	1:04
11.	"Room to Rent"	Glenn	1:48
12.	"Never Going Back"	Smal • Eugene Cordero	1:22
13.	"We're at the Prom"	Glenn • Croner	2:24
14.	"Right Here with You"	Glenn • Croner • Nichole Sakura • Smal • Heavens • Lovell • Bauza • Kenny	2:31
Total length:			27:35

==== Season 2 ====
Kiff: Season 2 (Original Soundtrack)

Soundtrack album by Cast – Kiff
- Released: July 25, 2025
- Genre: Soundtrack
- Length: 36:01
- Label: Walt Disney Records
- Producers: Nic Smal; Brad Breeck

A soundtrack featuring songs from the second season of Kiff, titled Kiff: Season 2 (Original Soundtrack), was released on July 25, 2025. The album features seventeen tracks, including the first appearances of "Buckets and Slides", "Left Hangin'", "Love's a Type of Magic", "Something to Confess", "I Love You but You're Fired", "So Fluffy", "Backpack", and "I Will Always Find You" before their parent episodes' (Note: "Buckets and Slides": "Fab Fourteen"; "Left Hangin'": "Don't Leave B Hangin'"; "Love's a Type of Magic": "Love Ed"; "Something to Confess": "Next Year's Musical"; "I Love You but You're Fired": "PS You're Fired"; "Backpack" and "So Fluffy": the episode of the same name; "I Will Always Find You": "Kiff Loses Barry".) release.

Kiff: Season 2 (Original Soundtrack)
No.	Title	Performer(s)	Length
1.	"Welcome to My Mind"	Kimiko Glenn	1:53
2.	"Trash Clumpers"	Glenn • H. Michael Croner	1:50
3.	"Buckets and Slides"	Croner	1:54
4.	"Good Morning"	Nic Smal • Glenn • Croner	2:23
5.	"Hard for Me"	Lucy Heavens	2:15
6.	"Second Place"	Glenn • Croner • Eric Bauza • Tom Kenny • Sophie Kim	1:55
7.	"You Can Do Magic"	Smal • Glenn • Croner • Kenny • Mary Mack	1:23
8.	"Good Morning Table Town School"	Glenn • Croner • Vella Lovell • Kenny	1:31
9.	"Left Hangin'"	Croner	2:28
10.	"Don't Let the Madness In"	Glenn • Bauza • Kenny	1:40
11.	"Love's a Type of Magic"	Smal • Heavens	2:44
12.	"Something to Confess"	Heavens • Glenn • Croner • Kenny • Bauza • Lovell	3:08
13.	"I Love You but You're Fired"	Smal	2:11
14.	"So Fluffy"	Lovell • Thurop Van Orman • Glenn • Croner	1:44
15.	"The Roof, the Basement"	Lauren Ash • James Monroe Iglehart	2:46
16.	"Backpack"	Lovell	1:11
17.	"I Will Always Find You"	Glenn • Croner	2:59
Total length:			36:01

==== Singles ====
Four Kiff singles have been released. The first, "Creeping Closer", was released on October 4, 2024, to commemorate the release of "The Haunting of Miss McGravy's House"; the second, "Show Them the Light", was released on January 15, 2025, for "Lore of the Ring Light". The third, "You Better Watch Out", was released on October 10, 2025, for "Ye Olde Candy Shoppe of Horrors". The fourth, "Into the Nightmare Realm" was released on October 30, 2026 for "The Screamwriter."

Singles of Kiff
No.	Title	Performer(s)	Length
1.	"Creeping Closer"	Kimiko Glenn • H. Michael Croner	2:09
2.	"Show Them the Light"	Glenn	2:38
3.	"You Better Watch Out"	Cusack	2:13
4.	"Into the Nightmare Realm"	Andy Daly	2:42

== Release ==
Kiff premiered simultaneously on Disney Channel and Disney XD on March 10, 2023, with the show's first six episodes released on Disney+ a day later. In June 2022, it was announced that the first season of the series would have 30 22-minute episodes.

== Reception ==
=== Critical response ===
Kiff received generally positive reviews from critics. Scott Tobias of The New York Times said that Kiff serves as a gateway to the gentle irreverence and surrealism found in animated favorites like Adventure Time and Phineas and Ferb. They described Kiff as a unique series that could appeal equally to parents and their young children. Joel Keller of Decider found Kiff to be a well-crafted buddy comedy. They noted that the humor in the series is character-driven and extends beyond typical children's comedy, while saying that the show also touches on relatable themes, such as Kiff's lack of understanding of family sharing. Keller appreciated the world-building in Kiff, and concluded that the series is enjoyable for both kids and parents, saying it offers surreal fun and smart humor that makes it a worthwhile watch.

Kristin Smith of Plugged In stated that Kiff effectively showcases themes of friendship, kindness, silliness, sacrifice, and love. They concluded that the series, while earning its rating for some angst and off-putting comments, is appreciated for its witty writing and ability to emphasize the value of childhood friendship. Tony Betti of LaughingPlace.com rated Kiff 4 out of 5 and asserted that it carries a nostalgic 90s tone, reminiscent of shows like Rocko's Modern Life, with subversive humor that might go over the heads of younger viewers but resonate with adults. Betti found that the show's bright, vivid visuals and simple shapes are eye-catching, while saying its witty storylines and relatable characters ensure lasting appeal. The inclusion of fictitious sponsors from Table Town during the title cards of each episode was also praised.

Tessa Smith of Mama's Geeky gave Kiff a score of four out of five and found it to be a good choice for a family-friendly show, delivering humor that resonates with both adults and children, praising the series for its fun, quirky style and distinctive animation. Smith asserted that while Kiff is less adult-oriented than Adventure Time and Regular Show, it still provides humor that entertains viewers of all ages, and also includes subtle life lessons about family, friendship, and honesty, integrated in a way that is not overly preachy. Ashley Moulton of Common Sense Media gave the series a grade of four out of five stars, praised the depiction of positive messages and role models, citing the presence of characters demonstrating kindness, and said, "Quirky buddy comedy celebrates kid friendships".

In December 2025, The New York Times television critic Mike Hale named Kiff one of the best international shows of the year, ranking it among the top television series of 2025.

=== Accolades ===
Year	Award	Category	Nominee(s)	Result	Ref.
2023	Children's and Family Emmy Awards	Outstanding Main Title and Graphics	Kiff	Nominated	
2023	Children's and Family Emmy Awards	Outstanding Voice Directing for an Animated Series	Sam Riegel	Nominated	
2024	Children's and Family Emmy Awards	Outstanding Children's or Young Teen Animated Series	Antonio Canobbio, Lucy Heavens, Ben Kalina, Chris Prynoski, Shannon Prynoski, Nic Smal, Winnie Chaffee, Matt Burns, Kayla Reid and Kent Osborne	Nominated	
2024	Children's and Family Emmy Awards	Outstanding Original Song for a Children's or Young Teen Program	"Things" (for "You Can't Handle the Tooth!")	Nominated	
2024	Kidscreen Awards	Kids Programming - Best New Series	Kiff	Nominated	
2025	GLAAD Media Award	Outstanding Kids & Family Programming or Film – Animated	"The Haunting of Miss McGravy's House"	Nominated	
2025	Annecy International Animation Film Festival	TV Film	"Kiff is Good at Sports"	Nominated	
2026	Kidscreen Awards	Kids - Best Animated Series	Kiff	Nominated	
2026	Kidscreen Awards	Kids - Best Holiday or Special Episode	"The Haunting of Miss McGravy's House"	Nominated	
2026	Kidscreen Awards	Best Music	Kiff	Won	
2026	Kidscreen Awards	Best Writing	Kiff	Won	
2026	Kidscreen Awards	Best Ensemble Cast	Kiff	Nominated	
2026	Children's and Family Emmy Awards	Outstanding Animated Special	"Lore of the Ring Light"	Nominated	
2026	Children's and Family Emmy Awards	Outstanding Animated Special	"The Haunting of Miss McGravy's House"	Nominated	
2026	Children's and Family Emmy Awards	Outstanding Multiple Role Voice Performer in a Children's or Young Teen Program	H. Michael Croner	Nominated	
2026	Children's and Family Emmy Awards	Outstanding Voice Directing for an Animated Series	H. Michael Croner (for "Up All Night/Rotten Banana")	Nominated	
2026	Banff World Media Festival Rockie Award	Animation: Children	"Lore of the Ring Light"	Nominated	
2027	Kidscreen Awards	Kids - Best Animated Series	Kiff	Pending	
2027	Kidscreen Awards	Best Music	Brad Breeck	Pending	

== In other media ==
=== Chibiverse ===
Chibi versions of numerous Kiff characters, including Kiff, Barry, and Helen, appear in Disney's Chibiverse, which is based on the Chibi Tiny Tales webseries where characters from the show already appear. Elements of Kiff first appeared in Chibiverse season two.

=== Video games ===
Kiff: Reel Good Time was a game based on Kiff. It revolved around Kiff and Barry looking for items around Table Town for Helen. It was available on DisneyNow as early as March 11, 2023, until the DisneyNow app's discontinuation and a website update removed the games.
