= Nic Smal =

South African animator

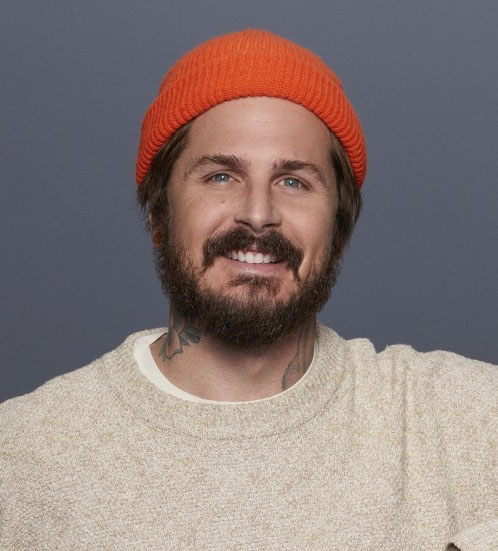
- Born: South Africa
- Occupations: Animator; writer; musician; voice actor
- Years active: 2010–present
- Employer: Disney Television Animation (2021–present)
- Notable work: Kiff
- Musical career
- Origin: Cape Town, South Africa
- Genres: Pop Punk; Alternative Rock; Post-Hardcore
- Instruments: drums guitar piano vocals
- Years active: 2002-present
- Formerly of: Serving Suggestion; New Altum; Gravity Wins Again

Nic Smal is a South African animator, writer, musician, and voice actor. Alongside Lucy Heavens, he is the co-creator, co-star, and co-leader of the animated musical-comedy Kiff and serves as an executive producer, writer, and storyboard artist for the series, in addition to writing and producing songs and voicing Principal Secretary and other characters.

== Early life ==
Smal's obsession with cartoons started at an early age when his family got a subscription to the M-Net channel in South Africa. His cartoon heroes growing up were The Simpsons, Rescue Rangers, Animaniacs, BraveStarr and Rocko's Modern Life. He cites 2D animation as the visual style that he most gravitated towards as a child, a medium which continues to inspire Smal to this day. As a young kid Smal would try to draw and emulate the cartoons he loved by doodling in his textbooks and teaching himself how to create a flip book of moving objects.

On an animation podcast, Smal shared that when it came to studying animation in Africa, he only had one choice: The Animation School in Cape Town. He said that in the early 2000s the trend was to teach and learn CGI animation which he wasn't keen on learning. He chose instead to study in a graphic design program where he learned typography by hand, figure drawing and photography. He said that this broader education allowed him to eventually pivot back to his first love of 2D Animation.

== Career ==
Cartoon productions in Africa were extremely limited when Smal was coming out of school. However one of Smal's classmates from Zimbabwe was affiliated with Sunrise Productions (best known for producing Jungle Beat) and he invited Smal to do some character drawings for them, which quickly expanded into storyboarding and writing work as well. Smal credits this experience to giving him a well-rounded jack-of-all trades approach and understanding of the animation pipeline.

From there, Smal worked in the animation and art departments of shows such as Caillou, Florrie's Dragons, Boxed Warriors, and Team Jay. Smal continued his trajectory of working in a variety of mediums, taking on work as an art director, animator, editor, ad creation and solo content creator of animated shorts.

Smal also played in the rock bands Serving Suggestion (with his brother Tim), Gravity Wins Again, and Versus the Wolf, and later formed the comedy duo Derick Watts & the Sunday Blues with his Gravity Wins Again bandmate Gareth Allison. In 2016, a YouTube video of Smal recording and mixing catchy beats made by his English bulldog Banjoe caught the attention of the Huffington Post in the UK.

Smal met playwright and comedy writer Lucy Heavens at a studio in South Africa where they bonded over similar comedic, animation and story sensibilities. Their collaboration on the creation of Kiff started when Smal re-shaped an initial crude image of Kiff the squirrel, originally drawn and imagined up by Heavens. Heavens and Smal have noted that ‘Kiff" is a slang word for ‘cool’ in South Africa, and they were inspired by the people and places they experienced when growing up in Cape Town, with many of the characters of Kiff reflecting the personalities of their own family and friends.

Smal ended up designing the entirety of the characters and world of Kiff, including Kiff's best friend Barry Buns, the bunny that caught the attention of the Disney Channel.

Kiff premiered on March 10, 2023, on Disney Channel in association with Titmouse Inc. At a Disney Branded Television - TCA Winter Press Tour and panel that Smal and Heavens attended, it was unveiled that Kiff has become one of the most streamed and most watched animated series on Disney Channel and Disney+ worldwide.

In June 2024 Smal was a panelist on the Disney presentation at the Annecy International Animation Film Festival called "Storytelling Through Music" where he offered an insightful look at the storytelling benefits of songs.

Smal has an overall development deal with Disney and will develop new animated shows, films, shorts and specials for the Disney Channel & Disney+. The deal includes a second animated series for Disney Channel currently in development pending for a series greenlight.

Smal is currently working on the third season of Kiff, which was announced as officially renewed by Disney.

== Critical reception ==
Pop culture writer Scott Tobias of The New York Times said that Kiff serves as a gateway to the gentle irreverence and surrealism found in animated favorites like Adventure Time and Phineas and Ferb. Tobias described Kiff as a unique series that could appeal equally to parents and their young children. The New York Times placed Kiff in the top 50 best TV shows and movies to watch on Disney+.

Smal's Kiff and its holiday specials have been nominated for and received multiple awards recognizing excellence in writing, production, music, and casting in children's animation. The second season of Kiff has earned nominations in the Best Series and Best Music categories at the upcoming 2027 Kidscreen Awards.

In March 2026, the Kiff special Lore of the Ring Light was nominated for a Rockie Award. The special which parodies The Lord of the Rings, has been described by critics as a “masterclass” in parody for its comedic reinterpretation of the beloved fantasy narrative using the characters of Kiff.

On February 24, 2026, Kiff won two Kidscreen Awards for Best Music and Best Writing for the episode Rock Kick, which features the original song Kickin’ the Rock written by Smal and performed by Orville Peck.Rock Kick follows Kiff and Barry as a simple game of kicking a rock home turns into a whimsical and surreal adventure, blending humor with themes of perseverance and growth.

Besides these wins, the series also received additional nominations in 2025 for Best Animated Series and Best Ensemble Cast.The Kiff special The Haunting of Miss McGravy’s House also received a Kidscreen Awards nomination for Best Holiday or Special Episode in 2025.

Additionally, Kiff has earned multiple nominations for the 2026 Children’s and Family Emmy Awards. Its two specials, The Haunting of Miss McGravy and Lore of the Ring Light, were both nominated for Outstanding Animated Special, and the series received further recognition with nominations for Outstanding Voice Directing and Outstanding Multiple Voice Performer.

Another episode that has received recognition for excellence is Kiff is Good at Sports which received the distinction of being an Official Selection at the esteemed Annecy International Animation Festival in 2025.

On March 29, 2025, Good Morning America offered its viewers an exclusive sneak peek of the highly anticipated White Lotus themed episode of Smal's Kiff, underscoring the show's broad appeal.

Smal was nominated for Outstanding Children's or Young Teen Animated Series and Outstanding Original Song for a Children's or Young Teen Program for the 2024 Children's and Family Emmy Awards. Additionally, in 2024 Smal was nominated for a GLAAD Media Award in the Outstanding Kids & Family Programming category for Kiff's Halloween special The Haunting of Miss McGravy's House.

Smal was nominated for two Children's and Family Emmy Awards for Outstanding Main Title and Outstanding Voice Directing for an Animated Series for his work on Kiff in 2023.Kiff also received a Kidscreen Awards nomination for "Best New Series" in 2024.

American magazine Variety named Smal, along with his creative partner Lucy Heavens, as one of the top ten animators to watch in 2021.

== Television ==
Year	Title	Role	Notes
2010-2011	Florrie's Dragons	Animator	
2010-2013	Caillou	Animator	
2017	Tail's Wedding Diary	Photographer	
2019	Boxed Warriors	Storyboard artist	
2019	Team Jay	Art director, writer	
2023-present	Kiff	Executive producer, writer (created by), Principal Secretary, additional voices	
