= Lucy Heavens =

South African animator

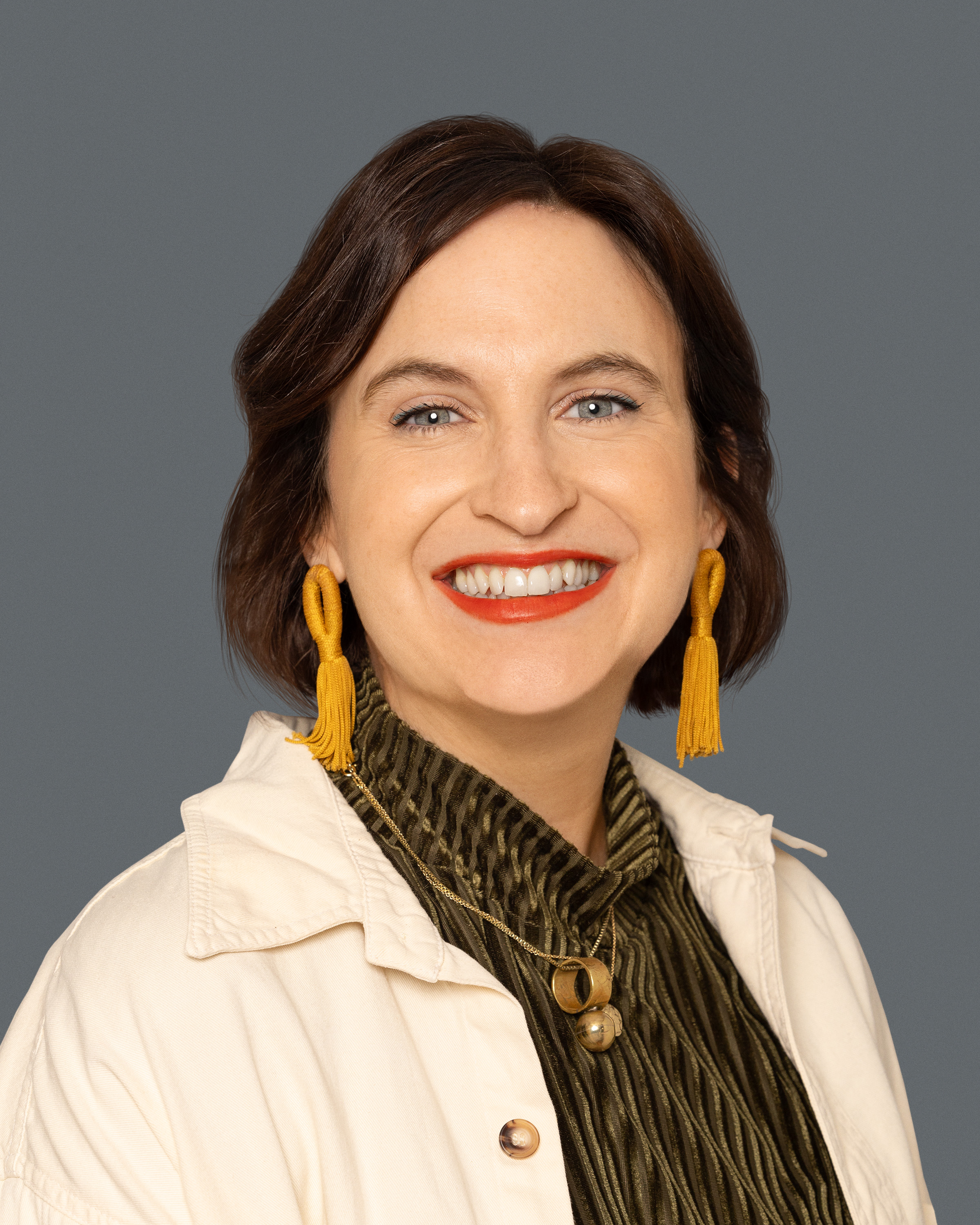
- Occupations: Animator; voice actress; television writer; television producer
- Years active: 2007–present
- Notable work: Kiff

Lucy Heavens is a South African animator, television writer, television producer, and voice actress. Heavens has a background in playwriting, comedy, performance and voice over work mainly in animation and cartoons. Heavens is a winner of the Disney-Triggerfish Storylab, a development incubator for writers in Africa.

Alongside Nic Smal, she is the co-creator of the musical comedy TV series, Kiff and serves as an executive producer and writer for the series, in addition to writing and producing songs and voicing Helen and Miss Tulane.

== Early life ==
Kiff was inspired by both Heavens' and Smal's childhoods growing up watching cartoons and taking animation classes in Cape Town, South Africa. Heavens' comedy inspirations are The Simpsons, Monty Python, SpongeBob SquarePants and Animaniacs. As a child, Heavens amassed a collection of self-recorded VHS tapes of The Simpsons. Heavens' grandmother contributed to the collection by taping and mailing VHS tapes of DuckTales from Australia (unavailable in South Africa at the time) to Heavens in Cape Town.

During high school, absurdism, Kafka, existentialism, and a love for cartoons and comedy led Heavens to study drama and playwriting.

== Career ==
Heavens has written for shows such as Supa Strikas, Moosebox, Space Chickens in Space, Love Monster, and The Mighty Ones. Heavens co-wrote and performed the play, EurAfrica, which was performed at the Edinburgh Festival Fringe, emerging as the Fleur du Cap People's Choice Award in 2007.

In 2016, her animated project, Wormholes, was selected for Storylab, an African development incubator led by the Walt Disney Animation Studios and Triggerfish Animation Studios. Wormholes is about three teen cosmic worms who adventure through wormholes to the far reaches of the Zooniverse, and help all manner of creatures deal with anything from planetary threats to "boring meanies."

Heavens has exclusively worked in animation except for a brief stint for two years in London working on late night comedy panel shows. The limitations of working in Heavens' native South Africa where budgets for animation shows were extremely limited forced Heavens to wear many different hats from producing to directing and voice acting to keep costs low at the studios. She credits these years as a producer/writer on extremely low budget projects as experiences that equipped her with the necessary skills to run her own show.

Heavens met storyboard artist and animator Nic Smal at a studio in Cape Town where they bonded over similar comedic, animation, and story sensibilities. Heavens and Smal's collaboration on Kiff started when Smal started to re-shape an initial crude image of a squirrel named Kiff, originally drawn by Heavens.

Hand-drawn 2D animation is Heavens preferred style of animation. She has cited 2D animation as a medium that allows for greater freedom to fine tune faces and expressions.

Heavens and Smal have noted that 'Kiff' is a slang word for 'cool' in South Africa, and they were inspired by the people and places they experienced when growing up in Cape Town, with many of the characters of Kiff reflecting the personalities of their own family and friends. Heavens applied to the Department of Trade and Industry in South Africa for funding to parlay a trip to Los Angeles into a stopover at KidScreen in Miami where she would have the opportunity to pitch Kiff.

In 2021 Heavens was a presenter at the Annecy Animation Festival on the original programming that was coming out of African animation in collaboration with Disney EMEA.

In an October 2023 interview, Heavens named Blooper Quest and The Sound of Helen as her favorite Kiff episodes.

== Critical reception ==
Most recently the second season of Kiff has earned nominations in the Best Series and Best Music categories at the upcoming 2027 Kidscreen Awards.

Several episodes of Kiff have been nominated for and received awards; these include a Rockie Award nomination for the special Lore of the Ring Light, two Kidscreen Awards for Best Writing and Best Music, and several nominations for the Children's and Family Emmy Awards. The episode Kiff is Good at Sports was an Official Selection at the Annecy International Animation Film Festival. Heavens herself was nominated for Outstanding Original Song for a Children's or Young Teen Program for the 2024 Children's and Family Emmy Awards.

American magazine Variety named Heavens, along with her animating partner Nic Smal, as one of the top ten animators to watch in 2021. The New York Times placed Kiff in the top 50 best TV shows and movies to watch on Disney+.
