= Music of Off Campus =

Music from the 2026 television series Off Campus

The music for the Amazon Prime Video romantic drama television series Off Campus featured an original score composed by Keegan DeWitt and an original soundtrack featuring acts from the stars, Josh Heuston and Ella Bright, along with other performances by Asha Banks and Suki Waterhouse. DeWitt's score and the soundtrack was released in conjunction with the series' premiere, distributed by Lakeshore Records and Island Records. The soundtrack became popular post-release, with the music being the important factor for the series' success.

== Background ==
The soundtrack of Off Campus compiles a blend of contemporary pop, rock and original songs which reflected the musical identities of its characters and the atmosphere of the fictional Briar University. Music supervisors Amanda Krieg Thomas and Anna Romanoff curated the series' musical selections, incorporating established artists alongside emerging musicians to complement its romantic and collegiate themes. Their approach placed particular emphasis on integrating songs into the narrative, with several tracks becoming central to character development and memorable musical moments. Executive music producer Alana Da Fonseca oversaw the development and production of the original music, including songs performed by the fictional band After Hours.

Ella Bright, who portrays Hannah Wells, performed several songs throughout the series, including covers of Elton John's "The Bitch Is Back" and Warrant's "Cherry Pie", alongside original material. One of the musical highlights "Girl That I Am", accompanies Hannah's musical showcase and represents the culmination of her development as a singer-songwriter. The song written by Grammy-winning songwriters Amy Allen and Ethan Gruska, and arranged by Da Fonseca. Bright learned to play guitar and piano for the role, and further trained with Allen to authentically portray Hannah's musicianship. Her vocal performances received considerable attention, which Bright admitted that her collaboration with Allen further encouraged her interest in pursuing songwriting and music beyond the series.

Similarly, Josh Heuston contributes vocals as Justin Kohl, the lead singer of the fictional rock band After Hours. The band's original songs was developed with the series' music team, which helps in establishing Justin's musical identity and complement Hannah's songwriting journey. Its repertoire also includes reinterpretations of existing songs and original tracks such as "Into You", "Keep Pretending", "Dirty Little Secrets" and "Yellow Haze".

The second season of the series, which scheduled for a 2027 release, would feature fewer songs performed live, owing to the absence of Justin in After Hours, and less focus on Hannah's songwriting journey, but would also accompanied more needle drops and star-led musical acts, like the first season.

== Score album ==
DeWitt's score album titled Off Campus (Prime Video Original Series Soundtrack) was released on May 15, 2026, through Lakeshore Records, featuring 54 tracks of his original compositions dispersed throughout the eight-episode series.

Off Campus (Prime Video Original Series Soundtrack) track listing
| No. | Title | Length |
|---|---|---|
| 1. | "Welcome to Briar U" | 0:36 |
| 2. | "Walk and Talk" | 0:32 |
| 3. | "I Can Totally Pop" | 0:50 |
| 4. | "Do You Love It?" | 0:48 |
| 5. | "Tutoring Rejected" | 0:50 |
| 6. | "Hannah Escapes" | 0:56 |
| 7. | "Gravity Shifts" | 1:51 |
| 8. | "Enter Garrett Graham" | 0:39 |
| 9. | "He's Looking Now" | 0:39 |
| 10. | "Hockey Talk" | 0:38 |
| 11. | "Don't Blush" | 1:16 |
| 12. | "Hard Launch Success" | 2:32 |
| 13. | "Sleeping (Hannah & Garrett Theme)" | 2:58 |
| 14. | "Make Me Feel (Justin Fantasy)" | 1:27 |
| 15. | "Allie & Sean" | 2:07 |
| 16. | "Text From Justin" | 0:31 |
| 17. | "Hannah's Request" | 0:35 |
| 18. | "Thank You for Your Service" | 2:02 |
| 19. | "Jules & Logan" | 1:15 |
| 20. | "Garrett's Jealous" | 2:07 |
| 21. | "Love Square" | 1:03 |
| 22. | "Allie Misses Sean" | 0:48 |
| 23. | "Allie's Ride" | 0:43 |
| 24. | "Dad's House" | 0:37 |
| 25. | "Childhood Bedroom" | 2:46 |
| 26. | "Family Dinner I" | 0:39 |
| 27. | "Understanding Garrett" | 1:08 |
| 28. | "Family Dinner II" | 0:59 |
| 29. | "Allie Evaluates" | 1:28 |
| 30. | "Delaney" | 1:17 |
| 31. | "Can I See You?" | 0:58 |
| 32. | "Joanna Maxwell" | 1:05 |
| 33. | "Briar vs St Anthony's" | 0:40 |
| 34. | "Hannah Spirals" | 0:52 |
| 35. | "Panic" | 1:37 |
| 36. | "Life Jacket" (Christian Almiron and Alana Da Fonseca) | 1:25 |
| 37. | "Connection" | 1:15 |
| 38. | "The Second That Lasts Forever" | 1:02 |
| 39. | "Consequences" | 0:44 |
| 40. | "Dad Talk" | 2:38 |
| 41. | "Just Write" | 1:18 |
| 42. | "Locker Room" | 0:31 |
| 43. | "Awkward Nice Moment" | 0:39 |
| 44. | "Punishment" | 0:38 |
| 45. | "Allie Through the Window" | 1:47 |
| 46. | "Contemplative Skating" | 0:34 |
| 47. | "Allie Always Knew" | 2:03 |
| 48. | "Garrett in the Hallway" | 1:25 |
| 49. | "The Guy On Your Right" | 2:07 |
| 50. | "You Got This" | 1:29 |
| 51. | "Flow State" | 1:01 |
| 52. | "Loving Hockey Again" | 0:30 |
| 53. | "Gathering Friends" | 1:07 |
| 54. | "The Deal" | 2:00 |
| Total length: | | 66:02 |

== Soundtrack album ==
Off Campus: The Mixtape is the soundtrack album accompanying a compilation of established musical numbers and original songs. It was released through Island Records on May 15, 2026. An Extra Credit edition featuring few more additional songs was released on July 24.

Off Campus: The Mixtape track listing
| No. | Title | Artist(s) | Length |
|---|---|---|---|
| 1. | "Into You" | After Hours and Josh Heuston | 4:13 |
| 2. | "Dancing With Myself" | Remi Wolf | 2:46 |
| 3. | "Page One" | Ella Bright | 3:12 |
| 4. | "Keep Pretending" | After Hours and Josh Heuston | 2:59 |
| 5. | "Underestimate Me" | Chloe Lilac | 2:53 |
| 6. | "Baby Now That I Found You" | Ella Bright | 2:11 |
| 7. | "Can't Get Enough" | Winifred | 3:13 |
| 8. | "Holding the Line" | Will Linley | 2:45 |
| 9. | "Over and Over Again" | Matthew Perryman Jones | 3:38 |
| 10. | "Dirty Little Secrets" | After Hours and Josh Heuston | 3:10 |
| 11. | "U+Ur Hand" | After Hours and Josh Heuston | 2:49 |
| 12. | "Kiss You" | After Hours and Josh Heuston | 3:18 |
| 13. | "Yellow Haze" | After Hours and Josh Heuston | 2:58 |
| 14. | "Too Busy Missing You" | Asha Banks | 3:26 |
| 15. | "Girl That I Am" | Ella Bright | 4:12 |
| 16. | "In Every Lifetime" | The Two Lips | 3:24 |
| Total length: | | | 51:07 |

Off Campus: The Mixtape (Extra Credit) track listing
| No. | Title | Artist(s) | Length |
|---|---|---|---|
| 17. | "The Bitch Is Back" | Ella Bright | 3:24 |
| 18. | "Page One" | Carol Ades | 3:39 |
| 19. | "Keep Pretending" | The Beaches | 2:59 |
| 20. | "Cherry Pie" | Ella Bright | 3:14 |
| 21. | "Baby Now That I Found You" | Ella Bright and Niall Horan | 2:11 |
| 22. | "Girl That I Am" | Suki Waterhouse | 3:58 |
| Total length: | | | 70:32 |

== Commercial performance ==
With the series' release, several songs featured in it experienced substantial increases in streaming activity. According to Billboard, the series generated renewed interest in both established hits and contemporary alternative pop and rock releases, with its frequent music placements contributing to the resurgence of older recordings and increased exposure for emerging artists. Elton John's "The Bitch Is Back" experienced a 577% increase in weekly on-demand streams in the United States, reaching 1.2 million, while Warrant's "Cherry Pie" rose by 122% to 1.1 million streams during the tracking week ending May 21. Contemporary releases also benefited, including G Flip's "Bed on Fire", The Beaches' "Edge of the Earth" and Audrey Hobert's "Sue Me".

The impact extended beyond individual streaming increases, with Jennifer Lopez's "On the Floor", featuring Pitbull, re-entering the Billboard Global 200 at number 117 and the Billboard Global Excl. U.S. chart at number 80, following its use in a Halloween party sequence. Commentators compared this, to earlier television-driven music revivals, such as in Stranger Things and Euphoria. Kristin Robinson of Billboard also highlighted the growing commercial significance of television music placements in the streaming era, noting how Off Campus and another romantic drama series Heated Rivalry, in the same year, introduced both established recordings and lesser-known artists to wider audiences. Carol Ades' "Hope Is a Scary Thing", for instance, registered a 5,595% increase in U.S. on-demand streams in the four weeks following the series' release.

== Chart performance ==
Chart performance for Off Campus: The Mixtape
| Chart (2026) | Peak position |
|---|---|
| Portuguese Albums (AFP) | 178 |
| US Billboard 200 | 97 |
| US Soundtrack Albums (Billboard) | 11 |
