= Jalen Thomas Brooks =

American actor (born 2001)

- Born: October 12, 2001 (age 25); Los Angeles, California, U.S.
- Occupation: Actor
- Years active: 2019–present

Jalen Thomas Brooks (born October 12, 2001) is an American actor. He portrays Mateo Diaz on the HBO Max drama series The Pitt and has recurring roles in ABC’s legal drama, Rebel, The CW's Walker, and the TNT drama Animal Kingdom. Brooks is also a regular cast member on the Prime Video series Off Campus.

Brooks made his feature film debut in the 2023 horror film Thanksgiving.

== Early life and education ==
Jalen Thomas Brooks was born on October 12, 2001. in Los Angeles, California. He has one brother. Brooks was raised in Las Vegas, Nevada, where he attended Liberty High School in Henderson, Nevada, and played basketball growing up. He attributes his interest in acting to The Hunger Games (2012). Brooks studied at DreamTraxx Acting Academy in Vegas, where he found an acting agent and began auditioning for roles. He and his mother often commuted for his auditions in Burbank.

== Career ==
In 2019, Brooks made his television debut in an episode of the superhero series Supergirl. He was later cast as Blaise on TNT's Animal Kingdom and as Sean in ABC's Rebel. On October 22, 2021, it was announced that Brooks had been cast as Colton Davidson on the action series Walker.

In February 2023, Brooks starred in Eli Roth's Thanksgiving. The film was released on November 17. In 2024, Brooks was cast as Mateo Diaz in the HBO Max drama series, The Pitt, alongside Animal Kingdom castmate Shawn Hatosy.

In 2025, Brooks was cast as John Tucker in the sports romance series Off Campus, a television adaptation of Elle Kennedy's book series of the same name. It premiered on Prime Video on May 13, 2026.

== Filmography ==
=== Film ===
Key
†	Denotes films that have not yet been released

Year	Title	Role	Notes
2022	7 Minutes in Hell	Eric	Short
2023	Thanksgiving	Bobby	

=== Television ===
Year	Title	Role	Notes
2019	Supergirl	Simon Kirby	Episode: "In Plain Sight"
2020	Henry Danger	Jack Swagger	Episode: "Cave the Date"
2021	Rebel	Sean	Recurring role Episode: "Pilot"; Episode: "Patient X"; Episode: "Superhero"; Episode: "The Right Thing"; Episode: "Just Because You're Paranoid"; Episode: "It's All About the Chemistry"; Episode: "Trial Day"; Episode: "36 Hours"
2021	Animal Kingdom	Blaise	Recurring role Episode "Power"; Episode "Splinter"; Episode "Relentless"; Episode: "Launch"
2021–2023	Walker	Colton Davidson	Recurring role Episode: "They Started It" (2021); Episode: "The One Who Got Away" (2021); Episode: "Barn Burner" (2021); Episode: "Dog Fir" (2021); Episode: "Where Do We Go From Here?" (2022); Episode: "Sucker Punch" (2022); Episode: "Nudge" (2022); Episode: "Boundaries" (2022); Episode: "Common Ground" (2022); Episode: "No Such Thing As Fair Play" (2022); Episode: "Bygones" (2022); Episode: "Torn" (2022); Episode: "Search and Rescue" (2022); Episode: "A Matter of Miles" (2022); Episode: "Something's Missing" (2022); Episode: "World on a String" (2022); Episode: "Rubber Meets the Road" (2022); Episode: "Something There That Wasn't There Before" (2022); Episode: "Just Deserts" (2022); Episode: "Buffering" (2023)
2025–present	The Pitt	Mateo Diaz	Recurring role (seasons 1 and 2)
2026–present	Off Campus	John Tucker	Main role
