= Louisa Levy =

American screenwriter, producer, and television creator

Louisa Levy is an American television writer and producer.

Levy studied theater directing at Columbia University and participated in a devised theater program in Johannesburg, South Africa. Levy began her career as an assistant to showrunners Tony Phelan and Joan Rater on Grey's Anatomy, who gave her her first staff writing job on the CBS series Doubt, before going on to write for In the Dark, Stumptown, The Flight Attendant, and Death and Other Details.

Levy is best known as the creator and co-showrunner of Off Campus in 2025, a romantic drama based on the book series by Elle Kennedy.
