= Calgary Academy =

Location
- 1677 93 St SW, Calgary, Alberta, T3H 0R3; Canada; 51.0395°N 114.2236°W

Information
- Type: Private
- Motto: At the heart of everything we do is your child.
- Founded: September 1, 1981
- Founder: Jim Gray
- President: Greg Bass
- Principal: Tim Carlson
- Assistant Principal Junior School: Liz Thompson
- Assistant Principal Senior School: Sheryl Walters
- Grades: K-12
- Enrollment: 700
- Student to teacher ratio: 1:12-20
- Color
- Website: https://calgaryacademy.com

Calgary Academy is a designated special education private school located in Calgary, Alberta, Canada. It offers academics from kindergarten through grade 12, with the kindergarten program opening in 2019. It was founded on September 1, 1981, by Jim Grey, a Calgarian businessman. Calgary Academy's first class graduated in 1987. Its core principles are respect, enthusiasm, altruism, commitment and honesty.

As of 2023, it has more than 700 students on a 16-acre campus, and 150 staff members.

The school has three programs: Academy, which designed for children with learning difficulties, disabilities, or ADHD; Collegiate, which focuses on post-secondary preparation, and Blended+, which combines in-person and online learning.

It has a 97.3% graduation rate, within three years of students entering Grade 10. As of 2022, the 93% of Calgary Academy students pursued post-secondary education after graduating.

== History ==
Calgary Academy was founded in 1981 out of a need for a school for students with unique learning needs, similar to Denver Academy at the time, to be created in Calgary. Originally, it was operated out of rented classrooms, relocating in 1994 to its current campus.

In 2010, Calgary Academy held its first Dig Pink volleyball tournament to raise money for breast cancer research, with teams from across Calgary participating. It has since become an annual event that has raised over $160,000.

== Academic programs ==
Calgary Academy offers four main programs designed to meet different student needs. The Early Years program (Kindergarten–Grade 2) focuses on building literacy, numeracy, and executive functioning skills in small classes with specialist instruction. The Academy Stream (Grades 3–12) is designed to help students with learning difficulties. The Collegiate Stream (Grades 3–12) aims to prepare students for post-secondary education. The Blended⁺ program (Grades 9–12) combines online learning, on-campus instruction, and experiential opportunities, giving students flexibility while maintaining access to extracurricular activities such as the CA Knights Athletics team.

== Alumni ==
One notable alum is 2019 graduate Khobe Clarke, an actor known for his performances in television shows Firefly Lane and Yellowjackets, and in the upcoming Cruel Intentions series.

Sean Thornhill, 2009 alum, as of 2023 is the Senior Sous Chef at Fairmont Chateau Whistler.
