= Stephen Kalyn =

Canadian actor (born 1998)

- Born: Stephen Thomas Kalyn; April 24, 1998 (age 28); Markham, Ontario, Canada
- Occupation: Actor
- Years active: 2018–present
- Known for: Off Campus, Gen V
- Partner(s): Victoria Lovatsis (2012–present; engaged)

Stephen Thomas Kalyn (born April 24, 1998) is a Canadian actor. He is best known for his breakthrough role as Dean Di Laurentis in the Amazon Prime Video series Off Campus.

== Early life ==
Born in Markham, Ontario, Kalyn played ice hockey from a young age, later becoming more interested in acting, starring as Danny Zuko in his highschool's production of Grease. Kalyn told the Hollywood Reporter about finding his passion for acting, “It was that moment then and there where I decided I going to do this. I don’t know how I was going to do it, but I was going to.”

== Career ==
Kalyn began his career with guest appearances in Canadian television series, including Transplant and Murdoch Mysteries. In 2023, he appeared in the films Warrior Strong and Cascade, and the miniseries Essex County. He was later cast in Law & Order Toronto: Criminal Intent and Paying for It.

In 2024, he joined the cast of Gen V in a recurring role, and also appeared in Motorheads.

In 2025, he was cast in the role of Dean DiLaurentis in Off Campus, adapted from the novels by Elle Kennedy.

== Personal life ==
Kalyn is engaged to Victoria Lovatsis, whom he has been with since 2012. When Off Campus was announced as a show, Lovatsis told him to audition for the role of Dean after she read the books and said he was her favorite character.

His great-grandfather, Leonard Mackenzie Reilly, was a Member of Provincial Parliament for Ontario.

== Filmography ==
=== Film ===
| Year | Title | Role | Notes |
|---|---|---|---|
| 2021 | The Perfect Wedding | Jake Powell | Television film |
| 2023 | Cascade | Vince | |
| 2023 | Warrior Strong | Gunnar | |
| 2024 | Paying for It | Carl | |
| 2025 | Out Standing | Kevin | |
| 2025 | Whistle | Mason “Horse” Raymore | |

=== Television ===
| Year | Title | Role | Notes |
|---|---|---|---|
| 2020 | Transplant | Brett | 1 episode |
| 2021 | Murdoch Mysteries | Chick Harris | 1 episode |
| 2023 | Essex County | Young Lou | Miniseries |
| 2024 | Law & Order Toronto: Criminal Intent | Rory Findley | 1 episode |
| 2024 | Cruel Intentions | Rourke | 1 episode |
| 2025 | Gen V | Greg | Recurring role |
| 2025 | Motorheads | Young Logan | Recurring role |
| 2026–present | Off Campus | Dean DiLaurentis | Main role |

=== Audio ===
| Year | Title | Role | Notes |
|---|---|---|---|
| 2026 | Rent Free | Jack | Main role |
