= Rebel (2021 TV series) =

2021 American drama television series

- Genre: Comedy drama; Legal drama
- Created by: Krista Vernoff
- Inspired by: The life of Erin Brockovich today
- Starring: Katey Sagal; John Corbett; Lex Scott Davis; Tamala Reneé Jones; James Lesure; Kevin Zegers; Sam Palladio; Ariela Barer; Andy Garcia
- Music by: Danny Lux; Rebecca Kneubuhl; Gabriel Mann
- Country of origin: United States
- Original language: English
- No. of seasons: 1
- No. of episodes: 10

Production
- Executive producers: Marc Webb; Andrew Stearn; Erin Brockovich; John Davis; John Fox; Alexandre Schmitt; Krista Vernoff; Adam Arkin
- Producers: Howard Grigsby; Bryan Thomas
- Cinematography: Todd A. Dos Reis; Dave Perkal
- Editors: Chad Mochrie; Nicole Artzer; Daniel Raj Koobir; David Crabtree
- Running time: 41–44 minutes
- Production companies: Trip the Light Productions; Davis Entertainment; Sony Pictures Television Studios; ABC Signature

Original release
- Network: ABC
- Release: April 8 – June 10, 2021

Rebel is an American legal comedy-drama television series inspired by the life of Erin Brockovich, created by Krista Vernoff, that premiered on ABC on April 8, 2021, and concluded on June 10, 2021. In May 2021, the series was canceled after one season.

== Cast and characters ==
=== Main ===
- Katey Sagal as Annie "Rebel" Bello
- John Corbett as Grady Bello, Rebel's third husband who is divorcing her
- Lex Scott Davis as Cassidy, a lawyer and Rebel's daughter with her second husband, Benji
- Tamala Jones as Lana, a private investigator and Rebel's best friend and former sister-in-law. She's Benji's sister and Cassidy's aunt.
- James Lesure as Benji, Rebel's second ex-husband and Cassidy's father
- Kevin Zegers as Nate, a doctor and Rebel's son with her first husband, Woodrow
- Sam Palladio as Luke, an attorney and a junior associate at Benji's law firm
- Ariela Barer as Ziggy, Rebel's and Grady's adopted daughter. She is a recovering addict with Lana as her sponsor.
- Andy Garcia as Julian Cruz, Rebel's boss who lost his wife after she received the Stonemore heart valve

=== Special guest star ===
- Mary McDonnell as Helen Peterson

=== Recurring ===
- Matthew Glave as Woodrow Flynn, a police officer who is Rebel's first ex-husband and Nate's father
- Mo McRae as Amir
- Jalen Thomas Brooks as Sean
- Adam Arkin as Mark Duncan
- Dan Bucatinsky as Jason Erickson
- Abigail Spencer as Dr. Misha Nelson

== Episodes ==
Rebel episodes
No.	Title	Directed by	Written by	Original air date	U.S. viewers (millions)
1	"Pilot"	Marc Webb	Krista Vernoff	April 8, 2021	3.65
Rebel will stop at nothing to convince Cruz to join her fight against Stonemore Medical, while also hiring Lana and Cassidy to protect a woman from her abusive boyfriend. While Rebel is off saving others, her husband Grady is on the sidelines dealing with issues at home.
2	"Patient X"	Adam Arkin	Krista Vernoff	April 15, 2021	3.57
Baffled and angered by Grady's sudden change of heart, Rebel helps Cruz build the case against Stonemore and enlists Lana's help in convincing a former patient to help them with their case. Meanwhile, Cassidy shares surprising news with Cruz, who is simultaneously dealing with trauma from his own past. Elsewhere, Nate tries to prove Rebel wrong and recruits a colleague to help him with his heart valve study.
3	"Superhero"	Wendey Stanzler	Jamie Denbo	April 22, 2021	3.14
Rebel and a group of local residents are campaigning for clean water. Meanwhile, Cassidy's new role puts the Stonemore case in jeopardy, and Grady becomes frustrated when Rebel remains consumed by her work; and Cruz reaches his breaking point.
4	"The Right Thing"	Adam Arkin	Henry Robles	May 6, 2021	3.31
As new details emerge about Sharon's cause of death, Cruz suffers a medical emergency that has unpleasant consequences. Meanwhile, Rebel and Grady make common cause with a crooked funeral director, and Lana meets someone from her past.
5	"Heart Burned"	Allison Liddi-Brown	Evangeline Ordaz	May 13, 2021	2.52
Rebel does everything he can to save Helen's life after she is denied surgery, and continues to push Cruz to negotiate the recall and examination of the heart valve. Meanwhile, Cassidy and Lana try to help Luke when his personal life threatens his career and reputation. Elsewhere, Cruz gets close to a new person.
6	"Just Because You're Paranoid"	Yangzom Brauen	Teleplay by : Rob Giles; Story by : Meghann Plunkett	May 20, 2021	2.97
Rebel and Lana track down a former sales rep who could be the secret weapon in their case against Stonemore Medical. Meanwhile, Sean reveals his truth to Ziggy; Nate and Misha grow closer; and Cruz has doubts about Angela's intentions.
7	"Race"	Jesse Williams	Staci Okunola	May 27, 2021	2.85
Against Rebel's advice, Cruz turns to a trusted source for evidence that the Stonemore valve is faulty. Elsewhere, Rebel, Cassidy and Grady team up to help Ziggy after learning that their friends have been unjustly expelled from school. Meanwhile, Lana continues to search for information about Angela and is instead confronted with a shocking revelation.
8	"It's All About the Chemistry"	Yangzom Brauen	Joan Rater & Tony Phelan	June 3, 2021	2.82
9	"Trial Day"	Adam Arkin	Krista Vernoff	June 10, 2021	2.82
10	"36 Hours"	Paris Barclay	Krista Vernoff	June 10, 2021	2.83

== Production ==
=== Development ===
On October 31, 2019, Rebel was given a put pilot commitment by ABC. On January 23, 2020, it was given a pilot order. On September 16, 2020, ABC gave the production a series order. The pilot is written by Krista Vernoff and directed by Tara Nicole Weyr. The series is created by Vernoff who was expected to executive produce alongside Erin Brockovich, John Davis, John Fox, Andrew Stearn and Alexandre Schmitt. Production companies involved with the series were slated to consist of Davis Entertainment, ABC Signature, and Sony Pictures Television. On January 25, 2021, Marc Webb and Adam Arkin were added as executive producers. On May 14, 2021, ABC canceled the series after one season. On July 15, 2021, it was reported that the series entered negotiations to relocate on IMDb TV for a potential second season. A month later, the series creator Vernoff announced that plans for a second season were scrapped.

=== Casting ===
Upon pilot order announcement, Katey Sagal was cast to star. In February 2020, John Corbett, James Lesure, Tamala Jones, and Ariela Barer joined the main cast. In March 2020, Andy Garcia and Lex Scott Davis were cast in starring roles. On September 20, 2020, Kevin Zegers and Sam Palladio joined cast as lead opposites of Sagal. On January 25, 2021, Dan Bucatinsky was cast in a recurring capacities. On February 9, 2021, Mary McDonnell, Adam Arkin, Matthew Glave, and Jalen Thomas Brooks joined the cast in recurring roles. On February 25, 2021, Abigail Spencer joined the cast in a recurring role.

=== Filming ===
The series began filming on December 2, 2020, in Los Angeles, California.

== Release ==
The series premiered on April 8, 2021, on ABC. Rebel aired in Canada on CTV, simulcast with ABC in the United States. Internationally, the series premiered on Disney+ under the dedicated streaming hub Star as an original series, on May 28, 2021. In Latin America, the series premieres as a Star+ original. Rebel was later removed from Disney+ and all other Disney owned streaming services in October 2022 due to cost-cutting measures.

== Reception ==
=== Critical response ===
On Rotten Tomatoes, the series holds an approval rating of 38% based on 8 critic reviews, with an average rating of 6/10. Metacritic gave the series a weighted average score of 57 out of 100 based on 7 critic reviews, indicating "mixed or average reviews".

=== Ratings ===
Viewership and ratings per episode of Rebel
No.	Title	Air date	Rating (18–49)	Viewers (millions)	DVR (18–49)	DVR viewers (millions)	Total (18–49)	Total viewers (millions)
1	"Pilot"	April 8, 2021	0.5	3.65	0.3	2.68	0.8	6.33
2	"Patient X"	April 15, 2021	0.5	3.57	—N/a	—N/a	—N/a	—N/a
3	"Superhero"	April 22, 2021	0.4	3.14	—N/a	—N/a	—N/a	—N/a
4	"The Right Thing"	May 6, 2021	0.5	3.31	0.2	2.04	0.7	5.36
5	"Heart Burned"	May 13, 2021	0.4	2.52	0.2	1.72	0.6	4.24
6	"Just Because You're Paranoid"	May 20, 2021	0.4	2.97	0.3	1.76	0.6	4.73
7	"Race"	May 27, 2021	0.4	2.85	0.2	1.81	0.6	4.67
8	"It's All About the Chemistry"	June 3, 2021	0.4	2.82	0.2	1.78	0.6	4.60
9	"Trial Day"	June 10, 2021	0.3	2.82	0.2	1.39	0.5	4.21
10	"36 Hours"	June 10, 2021	0.3	2.83	0.2	1.66	0.5	4.48

=== Accolades ===
Year	Award	Category	Nominee(s)	Result	Ref.
2020	California on Location Awards	Location Manager of the Year - One Hour Television	Jeffrey T. Spellman	Won	
2021	ReFrame Stamp	IMDbPro Top 200 Scripted TV Recipients	Rebel	Won	
