= Amanda Lawrence =

British actress (born 1971)

- Born: 1971 (age 54–55); Torbay, Devon, England
- Years active: 2004–present
- Children: 1

Amanda Lawrence (born 1971) is a British actress.

Lawrence studied theatre at Bretton Hall College and worked early in her career in the Edinburgh Fringe. She then moved to London and appeared in theatrical productions such as Brief Encounter, Playing the Victim, and The Firework-Maker's Daughter. She led the stage production of Jiggery Pokery in London in 2009.

In the 2010s she appeared in several television shows, including Above Suspicion, Dead Boss, the Midsomer Murders episode "A Rare Bird" as Olivia Carter, and Mr Selfridge. She also took roles in films, including Womb (2010) and Suffragette (2015). She appeared in a National Theatre production of Angels in America in 2017, and later that year took the role of Resistance commander Larma D'Acy in Star Wars: The Last Jedi, and reprised the role in Star Wars: The Rise of Skywalker. In 2019, she appeared in a London production of Top Girls.

In 2020, she played Barbara Farrell in the Father Brown episode "The Fall of the House of St Gardner" and in September 2020, she played DC Sarah Raymond in ITV's two-part television drama, Honour. She also appeared in White House Farm (2020) as Barbara Wilson. She joined the cast of children's historical drama series Malory Towers as Matron Shipley for the show's fifth season, and won the Children's and Family Emmy Award for Outstanding Supporting Performer at the third annual ceremony.

== Filmography ==
=== Film ===
Year	Title	Role	Notes
2007	28 Weeks Later	Carpark Civilian	
2007	An Jowl yn Agas Kegin	Valerie Roades	Short film
2008	Elephants	Fay Gray	Short film
2009	Me, Me, Me	Emma	Short film
2010	You Will Meet a Tall Dark Stranger	Medium	
2010	Tamara Drewe	Mary	
2010	Alice	Ice Cream Girl	Short film
2010	Womb	Teacher	
2011	The Lady	Nurse	
2012	Nativity 2: Danger in the Manger	Supply Teacher 3	
2014	Mr. Turner	Hannah's Friend	
2015	Suffragette	Miss Withers	
2015	Pan	Sister Joseph	
2016	Denial	Court Usher	
2017	Unseen	Manager	Short film
2017	Star Wars: The Last Jedi	Commander D'Acy	
2018	Christopher Robin	Joan MacMillan	
2018	Love on the A48	Doctor	Short film
2019	Lessons of the Hour	Susan B Anthony	Short film
2019	Real	Monique	
2019	Star Wars: The Rise of Skywalker	Commander D'Acy	
2020	Misbehaviour	Miss Gilboy	
2020	Summerland	Muriel	
2022	Matilda the Musical	Cook	
2023	Club Zero	Ms Benedict	
2023	Wander to Wonder	Mary	Short film
2025	Brides	Miss Westgate	
2026	Tender Loving Care		

=== Television ===
Year	Title	Role	Notes
2004	Casualty	Geraldine Branchfield	Episode: "Past Imperfect"
2006	Afterlife	Alison's Mother / Woman	2 episodes
2007	Hotel Babylon	Maureen	Episode: "Series 2, Episode 2"
2007	Doctor Who	Doomfinger	Episode: "The Shakespeare Code"
2007	Doctors	Judy Hine	Episode: "Quid Pro Quo"
2008	Little Miss Jocelyn		Episode: "Series 2, Episode 2"
2008	Little Dorrit	Poyner	Episode: "Series 1, Episode 1"
2009	The Well	The Hag	Episode: "Return to the Well"
2009	10 Minute Tales	Ministry of Weather Woman	Episode: "Deep & Crisp & Even"
2009–12	Above Suspicion	D.C. Joan Faulkland	Series regular; 11 episodes
2011	Once Upon a Time: The Princess and the Pea	Princess	Miniseries
2011	Little Crackers	Mrs. Oliver	Episode: "Shappi Khorsandi's Little Cracker"
2012	Midsomer Murders	Olivia Carter	Episode: "A Rare Bird"
2012	The Charles Dickens Show	Florence Nightingale	Episode: "Health"
2012	Dead Boss	Mary	Miniseries
2014	Mr Selfridge	Pimble	Series regular; 7 episodes
2015	Foyle's War	Hilary Knowles	Episode: "High Castle"
2015	The Enfield Haunting	Lindy Crane	Miniseries
2016	Houdini & Doyle	Sister Mathilda	Episode: "The Maggie's Redress"
2017	Will	Mary Shakespeare	Episode: "The Play's the Thing"
2020	Father Brown	Barbara Farrell	Episode: "The Fall of the House of St Gardner"
2020	White House Farm	Barbara Wilson	Miniseries
2020	Honour	DC Sarah Raymond	Miniseries
2021	The Amazing Mr. Blunden	Meakin	Television film
2022	Chloe	Angela	Miniseries
2022	Ridley	Lorna Spalden	Episode: "The Peaceful Garden"
2022	Avenue 5	Paula	Episode: "Is It a Good Dot?"
2023–25	The Change	Janet	5 episodes
2024	Alice & Jack	Dr. Feldshue	Season 1, Episode 5
2024	Ludwig	Julie Tate	Season 1, Episode 3
2024	Malory Towers	Matron Shipley	Series regular; 14 episodes
2024	The Devil's Hour	Evelyn Wiseman	2 episodes; Season 2, Episodes 4&5
2024–25	Malory Towers	Matron Shipley	20 episodes
2026	Gone	Simone Kinnard	4 episodes
2026	Rivals	Sally Menzies-Scott	4 episodes
2026	Bookish	Emilia Plumchute	2 episodes

=== Theatre ===
Year	Title	Role	Venue
2017	Angels in America Part One: Millenium Approaches	The Angel / Emily, a Nurse / Sister Ella Chapter / A Homeless Woman	Lyttelton Theatre, National Theatre
2017	Angels in America Part Two: Perestroika	The Angel / The Recorded Voice of Orrin, Mormon Centre / The Mother, Mormon Centre	Lyttelton Theatre, National Theatre
2018	Angels in America: Millenium Approaches	The Angel / Emily / Sister Ella Chapter / A Homeless Woman	Neil Simon Theatre, Broadway
2018	Angels in America: Perestroika	The Angel / Mormon Mother / Emily	Neil Simon Theatre, Broadway
2024–25	The Importance of Being Earnest	Miss Prism	Lyttelton Theatre, National Theatre
