= Off Campus =

American romantic drama television series

- Genre: Romantic drama
- Created by: Louisa Levy
- Based on: Off-Campus series by Elle Kennedy
- Showrunners: Louisa Levy; Gina Fattore
- Starring: Ella Bright; Belmont Cameli; Mika Abdalla; Stephen Thomas Kalyn; Antonio Cipriano; Jalen Thomas Brooks; Josh Heuston
- Music by: Keegan DeWitt
- Country of origin: United States
- Original language: English
- No. of seasons: 1
- No. of episodes: 8

Production
- Executive producers: Gina Fattore; Louisa Levy; Silver Tree; Marty Bowen; Wyck Godfrey; James Seidman; Neal Flaherty; Leanna Billings
- Producer: Ryan Silva
- Production location: Vancouver
- Cinematography: Colin Hoult; Nick Thomas
- Editors: Nicole Brik; Gordon Rempel; Lisa Robison; Nathan Easterling
- Running time: 46–56 minutes
- Production companies: 28 In Blue; Drowning Girl Productions; Temple Hill Entertainment; Billings Productions; Amazon MGM Studios

Original release
- Network: Amazon Prime Video
- Release: May 13, 2026 – present

Off Campus is an American romantic drama television series created by Louisa Levy for Amazon Prime Video. It is based on the Off-Campus book series by Elle Kennedy. Set at the fictional campus of Briar University, four close-knit college hockey players navigate the complexities of adulthood, relationships, and sex to ultimately find their true love. The first season centers on Hannah Wells and Garrett Graham, while introducing the core four college hockey players Garrett, Dean, Logan, and Tucker.

Off Campus premiered on May 13, 2026 and received positive reviews. In February 2026, ahead of the series premiere, the series was renewed for a second season, which is set to premiere on April 28, 2027.

== Cast and characters ==
=== Main ===
- Ella Bright as Hannah Wells, a music major at Briar University
- Belmont Cameli as Garrett Graham, a junior at Briar, who serves as captain of the Briar University hockey team known as the Briar Hawks
- Mika Abdalla as Allie Hayes, Hannah's best friend and Dean's eventual love interest
- Stephen Thomas Kalyn as Dean Di Laurentis, defenceman for the Briar Hawks, who is Garrett's friend, and Allie's eventual love interest
- Jalen Thomas Brooks as John Tucker, a forward for the Briar Hawks, and friend of Garrett
- Antonio Cipriano as John Logan, a forward for the Briar Hawks, who is Garrett's best friend and Jules' brother
- Josh Heuston as Justin Kohl (season 1), the front man of band After Hours whom Hannah has a crush on and recruits to help with her music project
- India Fowler as Grace Ivers (season 2), Logan's love interest

=== Recurring ===
- Steve Howey as Phil Graham, Garrett's abusive father and a former NHL player
- Khobe Clarke as Beau Maxwell, Dean's friend and brother of Joanna Maxwell
- Brandon Scott as Daveed, Hannah's music professor and advisor at Briar University
- Miles Gutierrez-Riley as Dexter, Hannah's other best friend
- Karis Cameron as Kendall, Garrett's former fling
- Kai Bradbury as Cass
- Riley Davis as Sean, Allie's on-and-off ex-boyfriend
- Jennifer Spence as Professor Tolbert, Hannah and Garrett's philosophy professor
- Chelah Horsdal as Carrie, Hannah's mother
- Chad Willett as Coach Jensen, the head coach of the Briar Hawks
- Julia Sarah Stone as Jules, John Logan's younger nonbinary sibling who runs the Briar gossip account known as Fifth Line
- Phillipa Soo as Scarlett, a theatre artist who is guest directing an original play for Briar's drama department
- Shay Rudolph as Summer Di Laurentis, Dean's little sister

=== Special guest stars ===
- Charlie Evans as Hunter Davenport, Dean's hockey rival from high school

In addition, Josh Chambers co-stars as Birdie, Quinten James co-stars as Delaney, Francesca Bianchi co-stars as Cindy, Marlee Walchuk co-stars as Della Malone, Brenna Llewellyn co-stars as Lexi, Frankie Randysek co-stars as Simms, Dylan Kingwell co-stars as Joe Rogers, Riley Orr co-stars as Jeremy, and A.J. Abell co-stars as Ted Stueber. Singer Remi Wolf made a cameo appearance as herself in "The Deal" performing at Briar University.

== Episodes ==
No.	Title	Directed by	Teleplay by	Original release date
1	"The Deal"	Silver Tree	Louisa Levy	May 13, 2026
Briar University hockey captain Garrett Graham, who has already been drafted by the Boston Bruins, is struggling in his philosophy class and needs a passing grade to continue playing and meet a degree requirement. Hannah Wells, a music composition major and a top student in the same class, is working as a janitor in the locker room when she accidentally walks in on Garrett nude in the showers. Embarrassed and flustered, she runs off, amusing Garrett. After noticing Hannah's A grade on a class essay, he recruits her to tutor him. Aware of her crush on classmate Justin Kohl, Garrett proposes to Hannah that they pretend to be a couple so she can gain Justin's attention. After some initial reluctance on Hannah's part because of her distaste of hockey and some of Garrett's jock antics, the two agree on the deal.
2	"The Practice"	Silver Tree	Louisa Levy & Nick Bragg	May 13, 2026
Garrett and Hannah practice kissing and pretend to be a couple in public, wanting Jules, the sibling of Garrett's teammate John Logan, to post about the relationship on their social media gossip account. The two become closer after a party in which Hannah and Garrett open up to each other about their respective love of music and hockey. Garrett confides how his father Phil has prepared him for a career in hockey since he was a kid. Garrett and John's teammate Dean sees Allie, Hannah's best friend and roommate, at the party and they share a brief charged moment on the dance floor, but she turns him down. Jules publishes a photo of Hannah and Garrett to the account. The next day, as Hannah boards a bus headed to a Briar Hawks game, Justin approaches Hannah and sits beside her, witnessed by Garrett, who's been developing feelings for Hannah.
3	"The Orgasm"	Samantha Bailey	Ian Deitchman & Kristin Robinson	May 13, 2026
Hannah grows closer to Justin and asks him to collaborate with her on a song for a pop songwriting competition. It is revealed that Hannah is uncomfortable in her own body after she was roofied and raped by a hockey player in high school. On karaoke night at Malone's Bar, Hannah overcomes her fear drinking with help from Garrett and sings "Cherry Pie" while intoxicated. Garrett takes Hannah back to his place, but when she tries to seduce him, he stops her and tells her to sleep it off. In the morning, Hannah gets a text message from Justin inviting her to come over to his place to work on songwriting, and she realizes she wants to be prepared for potential sex with Justin. When Garrett wakes up, Hannah asks him for a favor—if he could give her an orgasm, which she's only managed to give herself while alone.
4	"The Breakup"	Samantha Bailey	Cheech Manohar	May 13, 2026
After Hannah opens up about her assault and intimacy struggles, Garrett agrees to help her as a friend. Allie breaks up with her boyfriend Sean, but he expects it won't last. That night, Hannah arrives to Garrett's place, and, after setting Hannah at ease with the song "Baby, Now That I've Found You" on his phone, they begin to have sex. However, Hannah tenses up and cannot go through with it, so Garrett proposes they instead separately bring themselves to orgasm in front of each other. After completing the task, Garrett comes to openly accept that he truly likes Hannah, and his teammates urge him to tell her at the Drunk Shakespeare event. Justin is also at the event and confesses his interest in Hannah to her. After reassuring him she isn't serious with Garrett, she happily tells Garrett their "deal" worked since he got the grade and she got the guy. Garrett leaves the event dejected that Hannah likes someone else and goes to the ice rink to practice alone. After a conversation with Justin in which Hannah realizes it's Garrett she loves, she goes to the rink and sings "Baby, Now That I've Found You" to him on the sound system.
5	"The Cold Turkey"	Erica Dunton	Nick Bragg	May 13, 2026
Garrett and Hannah confess their mutual feelings for each other and become a real couple. For the Thanksgiving break, Phil asks Garrett to come home so he can introduce him to his new fiancée, Cindy. Though Garrett is reluctant to spend time with Phil, Hannah insists he go and accompanies him. John and Tucker, another member of the hockey team, stay on campus for Friendsgiving, which turns from a small gathering to a big one when other Hawks players bring their friends. Being at Phil's home dredges up memories for Garrett of the domestic abuse of his late mother by his father. He storms out with Hannah after realizing that Phil has also been abusing his fiancée Cindy. Garrett confides to Hannah about the abuse and his fears of becoming his father, and she reassures him he is not Phil. Meanwhile, Allie is revealed to be secretly hooking up with Dean since her breakup.
6	"The Breakaway"	Erica Dunton	Liv Coron & Emmy St. Pierre	May 13, 2026
The details of Allie and Dean's relationship are shown, the two having grown closer after karaoke night at Malone's and regularly engaging in no-strings-attached sex after her breakup with Sean. Allie wants their hookups to remain casual and secret for fear of hurting Sean's feelings so soon after a breakup, but also cannot resist Dean's charms. Allie and Dean spend Thanksgiving together at his parents' place in New York City, unbeknownst to their friends. At a hockey fundraising event at Malone's, tensions between Garrett and John over Phil's involvement in their fundraiser come to a head. After Allie spends another night with Dean, Sean accidentally walks in on her alone. Realizing she is already with someone new, Sean walks away in disgust.
7	"The Faceoff"	Dawn Wilkinson	Cheech Manohar	May 13, 2026
Joanna Maxwell, a Broadway actress and Beau's sister, visits campus and bonds with Allie over theater and acting. At a bar that night, Allie vents about her guy problems to Joanna. To prove that Allie can have successful casual relationships, Joanna goads her to approach a guy at the bar and they kiss. At the hockey game against St. Anthony's, Garrett struggles against rival Aaron Delaney. Aaron is revealed as Hannah's rapist, which is unknown to Garrett. Aaron sees Hannah kissing Garrett off the ice, and during the game, insults her to Garrett's face. An enraged Garrett loses his cool and beats Aaron up. As a result, Garrett is suspended for four games. Hannah confronts Garrett, saying she didn't need him to defend her in a violent manner. After a heated argument, the couple breaks up.
8	"The Line Change"	Dawn Wilkinson	Louisa Levy	May 13, 2026
Hannah drops out of the pop songwriting competition she entered for a new scholarship. Garrett gives the captainship to John and decides to quit hockey, as he felt he was only doing it to please Phil. When Hannah sees Garrett skating at the rink alone, she reasons why he shouldn't quit. She changes her mind about the song contest and manages to sneak in a final spot at the showcase. Allie convinces Dean to bring Garrett and friends to the contest to watch Hannah. Hannah performs her song "The Girl That I Am", inspired by her past trauma winning second place. Afterwards, Garrett apologizes to Hannah and asks for another chance; the couple happily reconciles. Meanwhile, to create distance in her relationship with Dean, Allie suggests to him that they sleep with other people. Dean is not able to follow through, but Allie has sex with the man from the bar. While the team spends a night out at Malone's, John explains he recruited a new member to the Hawks after Garrett's suspension, who is revealed to be Allie's hookup, Hunter Davenport. At Malone's, Hunter immediately gets into a fight with Dean and the other guys, due to a past incident involving Dean's younger sister.

== Production ==
=== Development ===
On October 1, 2024, Amazon Prime Video gave a series order for Off Campus, based on the Off-Campus book series by Elle Kennedy. The series is created and co-showran by Louisa Levy who is also expected to executive produce alongside Gina Fattore who is a co-showrunner, Wyck Godfrey, Marty Bowen, Leanna Billings, and Neal Flaherty. Production companies involved with the series are Amazon MGM Studios, Temple Hill Entertainment, and Billings Productions. Kennedy is also a producer. The first season is based on the first novel of the Off-Campus book series, The Deal. Principal photography for the series began on June 9, 2025, and concluded on October 2, 2025, in Vancouver, British Columbia, Canada.

On February 12, 2026, ahead of the series premiere, Amazon Prime Video renewed the series for a second season. On May 28, 2026, Amazon Prime Video announced that the second season is set to focus on Dean and Allie's relationship as the central couple.

=== Casting ===
On May 6, 2025, Ella Bright, Belmont Cameli, Mika Abdalla, Antonio Cipriano, Jalen Thomas Brooks, Josh Heuston, and Stephen Kalyn were cast as series regulars. In July 2025, Steve Howey and Khobe Clarke joined the cast in recurring roles. On November 6, 2025, AJ Abell, Francesca Bianchi, Kai Bradbury, Karis Cameron, Josh Chambers, Riley Davis, Miles Gutierrez-Riley, Chelah Horsdal, Quinten James, Dylan Kingwell, Riley Orr, Lauren Patten, Frankie Randysek, Brandon Scott, Jennifer Spence, Julia Sarah Stone, Marlee Walchuk, and Chad Willett all joined the cast in recurring roles. On April 30, 2026, India Fowler was cast as a series regular as Grace Ivers while Phillipa Soo joined the cast in a recurring capacity for the second season. On August 13, 2026, Shay Rudolph joined the cast in a recurring role.

=== Filming ===
Principal photography for the first series took place primarily in Vancouver. The fictional Briar University college grounds were represented by several different locations at University of British Columbia (UBC).

The Thunderbird Sports Centre served as the home arena for the fictional Briar Hawks hockey team, hosting the game sequences and locker room scenes. UBC's Irving K. Barber Learning Centre and the surrounding area provided the backdrop for campus and academic sequences. The exterior of the Sigma Phi Delta engineering frat house was used for the off-campus residence shared by the team. The Heatley, a pub in Strathcona, became Malone’s Bar and The DOUGLAS hotel in downtown Vancouver was used to portray urban settings, such as Dean Di Laurentis's apartment.

=== Music ===
The series was scored by Keegan DeWitt. The series' soundtrack, titled Off Campus: The Mixtape, was released via Island Records. It includes music recorded by Bright, fictional band After Hours, Asha Banks, The Two Lips, Chloe Lilac, Matthew Perryman Jones, Winifred, Will Linley, Remi Wolf, Niall Horan, Suki Waterhouse, The Beaches, and Carol Ades.

== Release ==
All eight episodes of the first season of Off Campus premiered on May 13, 2026. The second season is set to premiere on April 28, 2027.

== Reception ==
=== Audience viewership ===
Amazon Prime Video reported that the series reached 36 million viewers in its first 12 days of streaming, making it the third most-watched series launch in the streaming service's history.

=== Critical response ===
On the review aggregator website Rotten Tomatoes, the first season holds a 92% approval rating based on 37 critic reviews, with an average of rated reviews of 7.6/10. The website's critics consensus reads, "Off Campus thrives on titillation and the deliberate excavation of relationship dynamics in a whirlwind romance novel adaptation that genuinely cares for the genre and all its pleasurable trappings." Metacritic, which uses a weighted average, gave a score of 71 out of 100 based on 11 critics, indicating "generally favorable" reviews.

Critics praised the chemistry between Bright and Cameli. The Hollywood Reporter's Angie Han wrote, "The series is at its most endearing when the two are simply connecting, whether it's the normally confident Garrett gazing shyly at Hannah from across a crowded room, or the normally reserved Hannah confidently taking charge of their relationship". In Variety, Aramide Tinubu praised how the show gives "side characters... their own moments to shine", in addition to its sensitive treatment of sexual assault and consent. Gavia Baker-Whitelaw of TV Guide also praised the supporting cast, describing Garrett's teammates as "an oasis of consent kings and supportive himbos in a culture that otherwise promotes toxic masculinity", and commending the show for "[facing] up to the unpleasant realities of sexual assault in men's sports". Baker-Whitelaw noted that some of the show's rom-com tropes can feel "a little too glossy and derivative" and that comparisons to Heated Rivalry are inevitable, but "Garrett and Hannah's relationship is sincere enough to win us over".

More critical reviews judged the dialogue and pacing, commenting the series does not fully realize the steamy potential of its source material. Christina Izzo of The A.V. Club wrote "Off Campus' graphic sex scenes act as little more than jarring snags before we're breezily back to our goofy regularly scheduled programming".

=== Cultural impact ===
Lead character Hannah references her favorite band to be Canadian rock band The Beaches. Their single "Edge of the Earth" plays over the end of the second episode when Garrett realizes he is developing feelings for her. This moment went viral on social media, resulting in The Beaches gaining a significant number of online streams and over 5 million new monthly listeners on Spotify.
