= Khobe Clarke =

Canadian actor (born 2000)

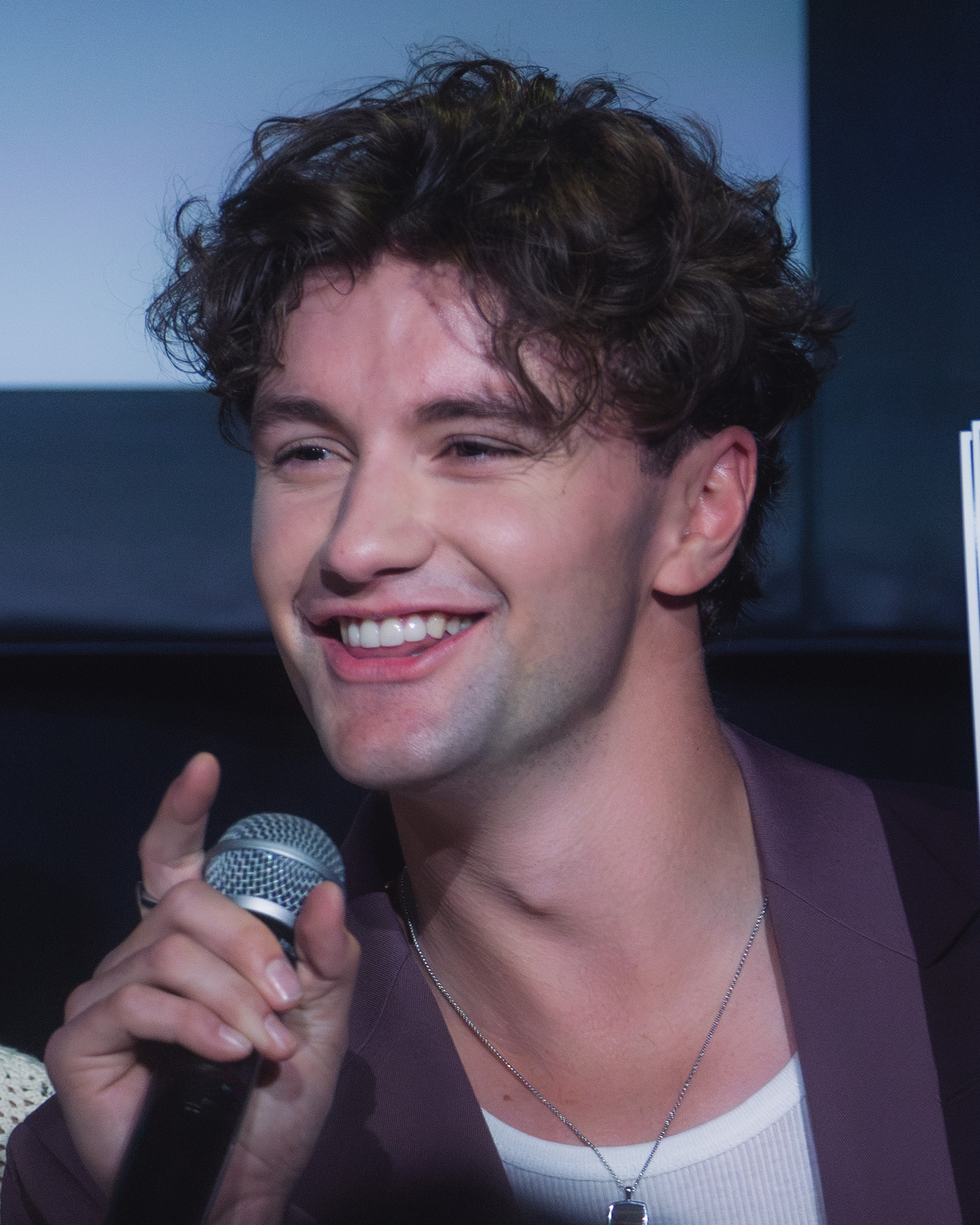
- Clarke in 2024
- Born: 2000 (age 25–26); Calgary, Alberta, Canada
- Occupation: Actor
- Years active: 2021—present
- Relatives: Jamie Clarke (father)

Khobe Clarke is Canadian actor. He is known for his roles in the television series Firefly Lane, Yellowjackets, V.C. Andrews’ Dawn, Cruel Intentions and Off Campus for Prime Video

== Early life ==
Clarke grew up in Calgary to parents Jamie and Barbara Clarke, with younger sister, Jaela. He attended Calgary Academy for high school, graduating in 2019.

As a teenager, Clarke worked at the outdoor gear retailer Out There Adventure Centre that his father co-founded. He later worked in landscaping, as a bartender, and at a golf course.

== Career ==
Clarke began attending acting classes as a child, eventually performing in productions of Sweeney Todd and The Wedding Singer in high school.

His professional career began with a gum commercial before he landed the role of Kyle in Yellowjackets, being featured in three episodes in season one and two. He then played Coop in five episodes of Firefly Lane. In 2023, Clarke played the lead role of Jimmy in the limited-part series V.C. Andrews' Dawn. In the 2024 Cruel Intentions television series he appeared as Scott, "the son of a congressman and a new recruit for Alpha Gamma." He was cast in the Off Campus television series as Beau Maxwell, a "major recurring role."

== Personal life ==
In 2019, Clarke and his father Jamie Clarke travelled across Mongolia as a digital detox, making local and national news. They travelled on motorcycles, horses, and camels, going west from Ulaanbaatar. The Clarkes hiked many mountains along the way such as the Khüten Peak, the highest mountain in Mongolia. Overall, they travelled over 2,200 kilometers (1,367 miles).

He currently lives in Vancouver, British Columbia.

== Filmography ==
Year	Title	Role	Notes
2021–2023	Yellowjackets	Kyle	Guest role; 3 episodes
2023	Firefly Lane	Coop	Recurring role; 5 episodes
2023	V.C. Andrews' Dawn	Jimmy Longchamp	4 episodes
2024	Cruel Intentions	Scott Russell	Main role; 8 episodes
2026–present	Off Campus	Beau Maxwell	Recurring role; 6 episodes
