= Malory Towers (TV series) =

2020 drama television series

- Genre: Historical drama
- Created by: Rachel Flowerday; Sasha Hails
- Based on: Malory Towers by Enid Blyton
- Directed by: Bruce McDonald; Rebecca Rycroft (season 1); Gary Williams (season 2); Tracey Rooney (seasons 3–4); Sunnie Sidhu (season 5); Jack Jameson (seasons 5–7)
- Starring: Ella Bright; Danya Griver; Zoey Siewert; Sienna Arif-Knights; Imogen Lamb; Amelie Green; Beau Bradfield; Natasha Raphael; Ashley McGuire; April V Woods; Ava Azizi; Edesiri P Okpenhro; Amy Roerig; Aviella Burch; Kimia Lamour; Emily Costtrici; Jennifer Wigmore; Geneviève Beaudet; Jason Callender; Amanda Lawrence
- Composers: Richard Pell; Lora Bidner
- Countries of origin: United Kingdom; Canada
- Original language: English
- No. of series: 7
- No. of episodes: 94

Production
- Executive producers: Josh Scherba; Anne Loi; Michael Goldsmith; Jo Sargent; Yvonne Sellins; Rachel Flowerday; Sasha Hails; Andra Duke; Michael A. Dunn; Angela Boudreault; Jeff Simpson; Amy Buscombe
- Producers: David Collier; Grainne McNamara; Angela Boudreault; Jim Corston; Daniel Bourré; Bruce MacDonald
- Production locations: Toronto, Ontario, Canada; Bodmin, Cornwall, United Kingdom; Hartland Abbey, England, United Kingdom
- Cinematography: Jason Webber; Nelson Rogers; Donna Wade
- Editors: Luke Sargent; Lauren Connors (seasons 3–4); Denise Lee-Hutchinson (season 1); Al Rogers (season 2); Cat Gregory (season 1)
- Camera setup: Single-camera
- Running time: 30 minutes
- Production companies: King Bert Productions; WildBrain (Note: As DHX - Malory Productions Inc. for Season 1 and WildBrain Malory Productions Inc. for all other seasons.)

Original release
- Network: BBC iPlayer and CBBC (United Kingdom); Family Channel (Canada); BYUtv (United States)
- Release: 6 April 2020 – 18 November 2025

Malory Towers is a historical drama television series based on the book series of the same name by Enid Blyton. The series is a co-production between King Bert Productions in the United Kingdom and WildBrain in Canada. (Note: Produced in association with CBBC, Family Channel and BYUtv.)

The first series was released early on BBC iPlayer on 23 March 2020, and later premiered on CBBC on 6 April 2020 in the United Kingdom. In Canada, the show's first series premiered on the Family Channel with a two-part event on 1 July 2020. In the United States, it premiered on BYUtv on 13 September 2020. The third season premiered on 4 July 2022 on CBBC.

Internationally, the series is broadcast on CBC Gem in Canada, ABC Me in Australia, ZDF and KiKA in Germany, Rai Gulp in Italy, e-Junior in the United Arab Emirates, Yle TV2 in Finland, SVT Barn in Sweden, NRK Super in Norway, HBO Max in Scandinavia, Space Power TV and Spacetoon Go in Middle East and HOT in Israel.

In 2022, a fourth series entered production, which began airing on 8 May 2023. A fifth series of an expanded twenty episodes was announced and filmed in 2023, produced entirely in the United Kingdom after interiors were previously filmed in Canada. The sixth series began airing in May 2025, with the seventh and final series released in October the same year.

== Premise ==
Set in 1940s post-World War II England - beginning in 1947 - the show follows the adventures of 12-year-old Darrell Rivers as she leaves home to attend an all-girls' boarding school and explores a nostalgic world of midnight feasts, lacrosse, pranks, a mystery ghost and lasting friendships. The TV series updates Blyton's post-war period piece for a modern audience with a racially diverse and inclusive cast.

== Cast ==
=== Main cast ===
==== Students ====
- Ella Bright as Darrell Rivers, an intelligent and excitable girl who has recently been expelled from her previous school (St Hilda's- Series 1 Episode 5 The Match). Though she suffers from word-blindness, her goal is to become a medical doctor like her father.
- Danya Griver as Gwendoline Mary Lacey, a spoiled and callous girl who has been homeschooled by a Governess her whole life up until enrolling in Malory Towers. Over the series she develops a romantic interest in Ron Gilson. While initially intending to go on to finishing school in Switzerland, by the end of the series after her father falls ill she plans to join the Women's Royal Naval Service.
- Zoey Siewert as Alicia Johns (Seasons 1–2; 4–7), a naughty and rebellious Canadian girl who influences Darrell into playing tricks and is interested in sports. Her parents work overseas so she is full-board.
- Sienna Arif-Knights as Sally Hope, a mature but moody girl who becomes Darrell's best friend and plans to become a nurse.
- Imogen Lamb as Mary-Lou Linnet, a naive girl and the youngest of Darrell's form. She is talented at art and develops an interest in becoming a teacher.
- Natasha Raphael as Irene Edwards (recurring season 1; main season 2–7), a ditzy but sweet girl who is talented at Music and Maths but struggles with other subjects, and comes from a Jewish family.
- Beau Bradfield (Note: Credited as Beth Bradfield.) as Jean Dunlop (recurring season 1; main season 2–7), a mature girl who is intelligent and talented at Lacrosse. She becomes editor of the school newspaper and aims to work as a journalist.
- Carys John as Ellen Wilson (seasons 2–3), a clever Scholarship student who is initially the reluctant best friend of Gwendoline, but eventually leaves her for the other girls. It is revealed that in the Christmas Special, she is moved up a form.
- Amelie Green as Wilhelmina 'Bill' Robinson (season 3–7), a tomboyish, sheltered girl who loves horses and keeps a Horse named Thunder, who she considers her “best friend”.
- April V Woods as Felicity Rivers (season 4–7), Darrell's younger sister who is determined to come out of her sister's shadow. The character was originally played by Minti Gorne in seasons 1 through 3.
- Edesiri Paula Okpenerho as June Johns (season 4–7), Alicia's troublesome younger cousin.
- Amy Roerig as Clarissa Carter (season 4–7), a member of Felicity's form. Clarissa is highly athletic but initially declines to participate in sports in order to conceal a health condition, which is later found to be Graves' disease. She also loves animals and horse riding and has a pony, Merrylegs, who is kept in the school's stables. In season 6 she is made head of form.
- Ava Azizi as Susan Heather (seasons 4–7), a member of Felicity's form that is a bit mischievous but also respects and honours the rules. She serves as the head of form during the girls first year.
- Kimia Lamour as Connie Batten (season 4–5), one of the twins in Felicity's form. Connie excels at athletics but has a hard time reading and studying history.
- Aviella Burch as Ruth Batten (season 4–5), one of the twins in Felicity's form. Ruth has an excellent history of finding good references for essays in the library, but she is only average at athletics.
- Emily Costtrici as Josephine "Jo" Jones (season 5–7), a new girl in the second form from a wealthy family who disregards the rules.
- Ciara Prioux as Celeste (season 6), who is sent to Malory Towers by her mother, who previously attended the school, for the first term of third form, though she doesn't know the reasons she has been sent there.
- Ellie Goldstein as Nancy Thomas (Seasons 6–7), the niece of Matron Kathleen who joins Felicity's class. Nancy has Down syndrome, which has kept her from joining most schools and landed her in an orphanage. When Kathleen learned her niece had been sent to an orphanage she left Malory Towers to become her legal guardian.

==== Teachers and Faculty ====
- Ashley McGuire as Matron Kathleen (Recurring seasons 1; main seasons 2–4 & 6–7), the strict but well-meaning Matron of the North Tower girls. An emergency family situation causes her to leave Malory Towers, but she is later persuaded to resume her position.
- Jennifer Wigmore (recurring Season 1; guest Christmas Special; main season 4–7) as Miss Elizabeth Grayling, the good-natured Headmistress at Malory Towers.
- Jude Harper-Wrobel as Ron Gilson (recurring seasons 1–3, 5–7; main season 4), the school gardener whose family lives near Malory Towers. He is friends with Darrell and later begins training to be a fisherman. He is also a musician and develops a romantic interest in Gwen. At the end of the series he is set to join the military as part of conscription.
- Geneviève Beaudet as Mam’Zelle Rougier (recurring seasons 1–3; main season 4–7), the French teacher at Malory Towers. She is strict and hyper-critical, but later gets better and listening and interacting. In addition to teaching, she oversees the girls when they reach the Fourth Form as their mistress. She marries Irene's father in season 4.
- Jason Callender as Mr. Parker (recurring season 2; main season 4–7), the Second Form master for Darrell's form then Felicity's form master.
- Karl Theobald as Mr. Edwards (season 4), Irene's father who marries Mam’Zelle Rougier
- Amanda Lawrence (season 5–6) as Matron Shipley, Kathleen's replacement who is extremely strict, even more so than Matron Kathleen.

=== Recurring cast ===
- Twinkle Jaiswal as Katherine (Season 1), a strict but fun girl and the Head of First Form.
- Saskia Kemkers as Emily (Season 1), an intelligent but private girl.
- Hannah Saxby as Pamela (Season 1), an athletic older girl who is later revealed to be a Debutante.
- Imali Perera as Miss Potts (Season 1), the kind but strict Maths, Science and Art teacher. She is the First Form mistress.
- Christine Horne as Margaret (Season 1), the assistant to Matron Kathleen.
- Birgitte Solem (Seasons 2–3) as Miss Elizabeth Grayling, the good-natured Headmistress at Malory Towers.
- Edie Whitehead as Georgina Thomas (Season 2), a wealthy girl whose father is quite snobby and mean.
- Christien Anholt as Mr. Lacey (Season 3 & Christmas Special; guest seasons 5 & 6), Gwendoline's strict father.
- Emily Piggford as Miss Julia Johnson and Jennifer Johnson (Season 3), a pair of twin criminals. Miss Julia Johnson is a trained teacher, but Jennifer Johnson pretends to be her at times.
- Bre Francis as Mavis (Season 3), an older girl who is talented at singing.
- Charles Jackson as Fred Gilson (Christmas Special–7), Ron's little brother. After being introduced in the Christmas Special Fred is asked to take Ron's place as a gardener at Malory Towers when Ron gets asked to help his uncle and become a fisherman.
- Louis Tamone as Mr. Jones (Season 5), Josephine's rich but kind father
- Gerald Kyd as Mr. Murray (Season 5), an archeologist who comes to look for lost treasure.
- Sophie Harkness as Jane Shipley (Season 5), a nurse and Matron Shipley's younger sister who originally came to Malory Towers to visit her sister but gets roped into being temporary Matron.
- Jodie Steele as Lily Vernon (Season 6), a professional actor who is a cousin of Miss Grayling. Lily has fallen under hard times but is too stubborn to ask for assistance. When Miss Grayling learns the truth she asks Lily to stay on board as the theater teacher.

| Actor | Character | Seasons | | | | | | |
| Actor | Character | 1 | 2 | 3 | 4 | 5 | 6 | 7 |
|---|---|---|---|---|---|---|---|---|
Darrell's year
| Ella Bright | Darrell Rivers | Main | Main | Main | Main | Main | Main | Main |
| Danya Griver | Gwendoline Mary Lacey | Main | Main | Main | Main | Main | Main | Main |
| Zoey Siewert | Alicia Johns | Main | Main | | Main | Recurring | Main | Main |
| Sienna Arif Knights | Sally Hope | Main | Main | Main (Note: Sally makes no appearance until 3x06.) | Recurring | Recurring | Main | Main |
| Imogen Lamb | Mary-Lou Linnet | Main | Main | Main | Recurring | Recurring | Recurring | Main |
| Natasha Raphael | Irene Edwards | Main | Main | Main | Main | Recurring | Main | Main |
| Beau Bradfield | Jean Dunlop | Main | Main | Main | Recurring | Recurring | Recurring | Recurring |
| Saskia Kemkers | Emily Lake | Main | | | | | | |
| Twinkle Jaiswal | Katherine | Main | | | | | | |
| Carys John | Ellen Wilson | | Main | Main | | | | |
| Amelie Green | Wilhelmina "Bill" Robinson | | | Main | Recurring | Recurring | Recurring | Recurring |
Felicity's year
| Minti Gorne | Felicity Rivers | Guest | Guest | Guest | | | | |
| April V Woods | Felicity Rivers | | | | Main | Main | Main | Main |
| Edesiri Paula Okpenerho | June Johns | | | | Main | Main | Main | Main |
| Amy Roerig | Clarissa Carter | | | | Main | Main | Main | Main |
| Ava Azizi | Susan Heather | | | | Main | Main | Main | Main |
| Aviella Burch | Ruth Batten | | | | Main | Main | | |
| Kimia Lamour | Connie Batten | | | | Main | Main | | |
| Emily Costtrici | Josephine Jones | | | | | Main | Main | Main |
| Ciara Prioux | Celeste | | | | | | Main | |
| Ellie Goldstein | Nancy Thomas | | | | | | Main (Note: Nancy makes no appearance until 6x08.) | Main |
Staff
| Jennifer Wigmore | Miss Grayling | Main | | Guest (Note: Jennifer Wigmore returns for the Christmas Specials, and Birgitte Solem departs.) | Main | Main | Main | Main |
| Birgitte Solem | Miss Grayling | | Main | Recurring | | | | |
| Ashley McGuire | Matron Kathleen | Main | Main | Main | Main | | Main (Note: Matron Kathleen makes no appearance until 6x07.) | Main |
| Amanda Lawrence | Matron Shipley | | | | | Main | Recurring (Note: Matron Shipley departs after 6x06.) | |
| Imali Perera | Miss Potts | Main | | | | | | |
| Geneviève Baudet | Mam'zelle Rougier | Recurring | Recurring | Recurring | Main | Recurring | Recurring | Recurring |
| Jason Callender | Mr Parker | | Main | | Main | Main | Main | Main |
| Emily Piggford | Miss Johnson | | | Main | | | | |
| Jude Harper-Wrobel | Ron Gilson | Recurring | Recurring | Recurring | Recurring | Recurring | Recurring | Recurring |
| Charles Jackson | Fred Gilson | | | Guest (Note: Fred appears only in the Christmas Specials.) | Recurring | Recurring | Recurring | Recurring |

== Episodes ==
| Series | Episodes | Originally released | |
| Series | Episodes | First released | Last released |
|---|---|---|---|
| 1 | 13 | 6 April 2020 | 29 June 2020 |
| 2 | 13 | 22 November 2021 | 7 February 2022 |
| 3 | 13 | 4 July 2022 | 19 September 2022 |
| Christmas Specials | 2 | 4 December 2022 | 6 December 2022 |
| 4 | 13 | 8 May 2023 | 13 June 2023 |
| 5 | 20 | 5 May 2024 | 3 December 2024 |
| 6 | 10 | 18 May 2025 | 8 July 2025 |
| 7 | 10 | 4 October 2025 | 18 November 2025 |

=== Series 1 (2020) ===
| No. | Title | Directed by | Written by | Original release date |
|---|---|---|---|---|
| 1 | "The First Day" | Bruce McDonald | Rachel Flowerday and Sasha Hails | 6 April 2020 (CBBC); 13 September 2020 (BYUtv) |
New girls Darrell Rivers, Sally Hope and Gwendoline Mary Lacey arrive for their first day at Malory Towers, their new school on a clifftop location above an idyllic coastline. They meet Miss Grayling, the wise and dignified headmistress, no-nonsense First Form mistress Miss Potts, and the stern Matron. Gwendoline hopes that she and Darrell will be best friends, but is due for an unpleasant surprise.
| 2 | "The New Girls" | Bruce McDonald | Julie Dixon | 13 April 2020 (CBBC); 13 September 2020 (BYUtv) |
Darrell hopes for a place on the first form lacrosse team, but after she misses the trials when her sports shoes mysteriously disappear, Head Girl Pamela includes her as a first reserve. Jealous of Darrell's popularity, Gwen becomes determined to learn to truth of her past at St. Hilda's.
| 3 | "The Trick" | Bruce McDonald | Richie Conroy and Mark Hodkinson | 20 April 2020 (CBBC); 20 September 2020 (BYUtv) |
Alicia's new trick sweets are confiscated by Matron, with unfortunate results when Matron unwisely samples one herself. Alicia and Darrell devise another trick with riotous results in Mam'zelle Rougier's French class. When Gwen sneaks to Matron, Darrell needs to think quickly to avoid being reported to Miss Grayling, but still has to face a difficult interview with Miss Potts.
| 4 | "The Slap" | Rebecca Rycroft | Rachel Flowerday and Sasha Hails | 27 April 2020 (CBBC); 27 September 2020 (BYUtv) |
Gwen's unpleasant side surfaces when she bullies timid Mary-Lou in the swimming pool. Darrell loses her temper and does something unspeakable to Gwen. The First Formers hold a form meeting to decide what should be done, which leaves Mary-Lou devoted to Darrell and Gwen more resentful than ever.
| 5 | "The Match" | Rebecca Rycroft | Rachel Flowerday and Sasha Hails | 4 May 2020 (CBBC); 4 October 2020 (BYUtv) |
Darrell replaces Sally on the lacrosse team when she drops out with an illness, but when their opponents are unexpectedly replaced by her old school, St. Hilda's, she finds herself having to face her past. In this, she receives good advice from Mary-Lou and Sally, while Gwen hears some home truths.
| 6 | "The Midnight Feast" | Rebecca Rycroft | Julia Kent | 11 May 2020 (CBBC); 11 October 2020 (BYUtv) |
Alicia receives a food hamper for her birthday and plans a midnight feast in North Tower, but Darrell is reluctant to lose sleep on the night before an important examination. When the midnight feast is interrupted by Matron, forcing the girls to hide in Miss Grayling's study, Gwen finds an opportunity to cheat in the exam.
| 7 | "The Open Day" | Rebecca Rycroft | Kate Hewlett | 18 May 2020 (CBBC); 18 October 2020 (BYUtv) |
When Malory Towers welcomes the girls' parents to an open day, Darrell is worried about the poor grades in her half term report and struggles to find a companion to introduce to her parents as her best friend. Mary-Lou is invited to a picnic by Gwen with her mother, and has to endure Gwen's untruthful boasting about her academic and sporting prowess.
| 8 | "The Push" | Rebecca Rycroft | Rachel Flowerday and Sasha Hails | 25 May 2020 (CBBC); 25 October 2020 (BYUtv) |
Sally behaves oddly whenever her baby sister is mentioned. Darrell joins Head Girl Pamela's the remedial class to improve her grades. When Sally is again taken ill with stomach pains, Matron is dismissive, but Darrell believes otherwise and, fearing she may be responsible, does all she can to find a doctor who can treat her.
| 9 | "The Letter" | Rebecca Rycroft | Rachel Flowerday and Sasha Hails | 1 June 2020 (CBBC); 1 November 2020 (BYUtv) |
Sally sees the Malory Towers ghost again while recovering in the sanatorium. Darrell, still worried about Sally, writes to Sally's mother saying she is unhappy, but her good intentions backfire when her mother decides to remove her from Malory Towers. Gwen volunteers to replace Sally as Pamela's monitor, with catastrophic results. Pamela, meanwhile, makes a discovery that seems to explain Darrell's slowness in class.
| 10 | "The Dress" | Bruce McDonald | Richie Conroy and Mark Hodkinson | 8 June 2020 (CBBC); 8 November 2020 (BYUtv) |
A beautiful dress arrives at Malory Towers and there is much speculation as to who the owner might be. Darrell replaces Gwen as Pamela's monitor, but is disappointed when she finds out that Pamela has changed her plans to train as a teacher, and will be leaving Malory Towers.
| 11 | "The Spider" | Bruce McDonald | Richie Conroy and Mark Hodkinson | 15 June 2020 (CBBC); 15 November 2020 (BYUtv) |
Timid Mary-Lou is terrified of spiders and falls victim to several spiteful tricks, including the appearance of a large spider that creates mayhem in the French class. Darrell and Sally devise a plan to improve Mary-Lou's confidence, after which the girls buy her a beautiful fountain pen to remind her of her bravery. Meanwhile, Alicia devises a plan to get Sally out of the San.
| 12 | "The Ghost" | Bruce McDonald | Kate Hewlett | 22 June 2020 (CBBC); 22 November 2020 (BYUtv) |
Darrell and Sally work together to track down the Malory Towers ghost. After mapping out all the sightings of the ghost, they mount a night-time watch which finally reveals the truth, which could end with major consequences for one of the girls. Meanwhile, a jealous act of spite is directed at Mary-Lou.
| 13 | "The Last Day" | Bruce McDonald | Rachel Flowerday and Sasha Hails | 29 June 2020 (CBBC); 29 November 2020 (BYUtv) |
It is the last day of term. The girls are horrified when Mary-Lou discovers her new fountain pen has been deliberately smashed. The evidence seems to point to Darrell, who must defend herself to the rest of the form, but Mary-Lou's faith in Darrell is unshaken and it is she who finds the evidence that reveals the real culprit.

=== Series 2 (2021) ===
| No. | Title | Directed by | Written by | Original release date |
|---|---|---|---|---|
| 14 | "The Head of Form" | Bruce McDonald | Rachel Flowerday and Sasha Hails | 22 November 2021 (BBC iPlayer); 27 February 2022 (BYUtv App) |
The girls are now in the second form at Malory Towers. They are joined by newcomers Ellen Wilson, a scholarship girl, and Mr Parker, the new master of the second form. One of the first tasks for the girls is to elect a new Head of Form, and must choose between three candidates. Meanwhile Darrell's dyslexia continues to cause problems for her.
| 15 | "The Dunce's Cap" | Bruce McDonald | Matt Evans | 22 November 2021 (BBC iPlayer); 27 February 2022 (BYUtv App) |
Matron advises Mr Parker to take a firm hand with the second form girls, else they will be out of control. His solution is to introduce the girls to the "Dunce's Cap," much to their discomfort. They respond using Alicia's new pink chalk trick. The girls discover there is a talented artist in their midst when a sharply-drawn caricature of Mr Parker is found.
| 16 | "The Stray" | Bruce McDonald | Rob Kinsman | 22 November 2021 (BBC iPlayer); 27 February 2022 (BYUtv App) |
When Matron's smoked kippers disappear, she suspects there may be a thief at Malory Towers. The mystery is solved when Ellen finds a stray cat in the grounds, but finds herself in trouble when she decides to adopt it. As more caricatures appear, the girls notice a clue that enables them to identify the unknown artist.
| 17 | "The Auditions" | Gary Williams | Wally Jiagoo | 22 November 2021 (BBC iPlayer); 27 February 2022 (BYUtv App) |
A school play featuring Lady Jane Malory is planned. Gwen auditions for the lead role with Darrell's help, but things do not work out as she had planned. After the girls discover that Malory Towers may be in financial difficulties, Darrell and Sally embark on a search for Lady Jane's long-lost jewels, but do not allow for Alicia's mischievous nature.
| 18 | "The Caricatures" | Gary Williams | Shazia Rashid | 22 November 2021 (BBC iPlayer); 27 February 2022 (BYUtv App) |
It is Alicia's birthday and, to her dismay, her usual hamper from her parents fails to arrive. The girls decide to bake a cake to cheer her up, but their plans are interrupted when a furious Mam'zelle Rougier discovers a caricature showing her being spoon-fed cod liver oil by Matron. A softer side of Matron is seen when she saves the cake and placates Mam'zelle.
| 19 | "The Runaway" | Gary Williams | Julie Dixon | 22 November 2021 (BBC iPlayer); 27 February 2022 (BYUtv App) |
Ellen worries that her Malory Towers scholarship may be taken away from her if she does not perform well in her academic work. Despite overworking to prepare for a class test, she convinces herself that she is a failure and, distraught, runs away. Gwen's preparations for the school play, meanwhile, are not going well, and the rumour that Malory Towers may be forced to close because of financial problems is spreading wider.
| 20 | "The Play" | Gary Williams | Rachel Flowerday and Sasha Hails | 22 November 2021 (BBC iPlayer); 27 February 2022 (BYUtv App) |
It's Open Day at Malory Towers, and Miss Grayling recruits Darrell's help to show a potential school investor, Mr. Thomas, a tour of the school. Matron learns that Malory Towers could close and begins searching for other suitors that might have her. Meanwhile Gwen swears her friends to secrecy about her Father's illness, but when Grandma Margo asks Gwen's mom if her husband is feeling any better it could cause problems. Finally Darrell is called on at last minute to fill-in for Gwen in the play because Gwen's mom confronts her about lies.
| 21 | "The Measles" | Bruce McDonald | Matt Evans | 22 November 2021 (BBC iPlayer); 27 February 2022 (BYUtv App) |
Georgina goes to Matron seeking some anti itching medicine only to learn the spots she's broken out in are the measles, forcing her into isolation. Meanwhile Mr. Parker goes to Matron because he's developed a fever. Matron decides to use his time in the nurse's office to read her newly published play. With Mr. Parker out, Sally is left in charge of the second year girls, but can she get them to do their work when all they want is to have some fun?
| 22 | "The Sneezing Trick" | Bruce McDonald | Shazia Rashid | 22 November 2021 (BBC iPlayer); 27 February 2022 (BYUtv App) |
Alicia gets a new trick and decides to play it on Mam'zelle, but if she gets caught then Sally could be the one in trouble for being head of form. Meanwhile Gwen offers to buy sweets for everyone on an upcoming trip in hopes of buying their friendship, but in order to do so she might have to sell her mom's piece of jewelry. And when Gwen starts seeing what causes everyone else happiness, she decides to steal those items and make them all as miserable as her.
| 23 | "The School Trip" | Bruce McDonald | Julie Dixon | 22 November 2021 (BBC iPlayer); 27 February 2022 (BYUtv App) |
The Malory Towers girls, minus Darrell and Sally, go on a school field tip. Gwen has promised ices to everyone, but when her and Mary-Lou accidentally miss the bus they must join Darrell and Sally performing various tasks around the school to better everything. The tasks may provide Gwen a chance to find a good hiding place for her stolen goods, or it may result in her getting caught and punished for good, but they also provide Darrell and Sally the opportunity to figure out where Lady Malory's hidden treasure might be so they can save the school.
| 24 | "The Quiz" | Gary Williams | Rob Kinsman | 22 November 2021 (BBC iPlayer); 27 February 2022 (BYUtv App) |
A quiz competition is held between the girls or Malory Towers and the local boys school, Thackerton College. Mr. Parker chooses the team he thinks will be best to beat the boys he used to teach. Meanwhile the girls learn that Gwen's mothers broch is in the local pawn store, and they want to go into town and learn who sold him it so they can learn the thief. Elsewhere Ellen is questioned because she's always disappearing by herself outside, making her one of the top suspects to be a thief.
| 25 | "The Heroine" | Gary Williams | Rachel Flowerday and Sasha Hails | 22 November 2021 (BBC iPlayer); 27 February 2022 (BYUtv App) |
With Ellen still missing after being caught with Mr. Parker's pen, the girls begin to question whether or not she is truly innocent. It forces Sally to look into Ellen's trunk only to learn she only has a blanket. Gwen comes up with the idea that Ellen must be stealing everything since she's poor, so the girls decide to talk to Miss Grayling about it during the break. Meanwhile Gwen decides to try and get rid of the stuff she has stolen, but in the process it could cause Mary-Lou to get hurt.
| 26 | "The Lost Treasure" | Gary Williams | Rachel Flowerday and Sasha Hails | 22 November 2021 (BBC iPlayer); 27 February 2022 (BYUtv App) |
It is the last day of second form at Malory Towers, and despite all efforts Miss Grayling is prepared to sale Malory Towers to Mr. Thomas. She informs all the girls that Malory Towers will be closing, but also calls the girls out for harboring a thief who isn't willing to admit the truth. As Darrell and Sally walk the beach Ron gives them a couple of items he found on the beach. They realize it's some of the stolen items and ask Ron to show them where it was at. As Gwen debates how to admit that she's the thief Darrell and Sally realize the spot Ron found the items at is where Mary-Lou nearly fell from the cliff, but they also make a discovery that could save the school from being turned into a mine.

=== Series 3 (2022) ===
| No. | Title | Directed by | Written by | Original release date |
|---|---|---|---|---|
| 27 | "New Arrivals" | Tracey Rooney | Rachel Flowerday and Sasha Hails | 4 July 2022 (BBC iPlayer); 29 August 2022 (BYUtv App) |
The girls return to Malory Towers where they meet their new instructor, Miss Johnson, and new classmate, Bill (Wilhelmina), while Sally does not start immediately as she has the mumps. Gwen's father is offered the position of the Head of the Board of Governors, but he refuses to discuss his decision with Gwen unless she first truly tries to become a Malory Towers girl in more than appearance. Meanwhile, Bill decides to leave when Miss Johnson decides she needs to go back to second form, but Darrell thinks another solution could be available.
| 28 | "The Trials" | Tracey Rooney | Rachel Flowerday and Sasha Hails | 4 July 2022 (BBC iPlayer); 29 August 2022 (BYUtv App) |
Mary-Lou begins suffering from severe acne and her period, but she tries to hide it by wearing a scarf and claiming she's cold. Matron is asked to give the girls a lesson on some of the difficulties they'll suffer as they're growing up. Meanwhile, lacrosse trials are held with both Gwen and Mary-Lou being possible surprise additions, but the girls have to find a way to motivate Gwen to play when she doesn't believe she has the skills. Note: This episode has alternate scenes and dialogue for its U.S. broadcast on BYUtv, in which Mary-Lou only has severe acne on her back, rather than getting her period.
| 29 | "The Surprise Picnic" | Tracey Rooney | Shazia Rashid | 4 July 2022 (BBC iPlayer); 29 August 2022 (BYUtv App) |
Darrell decides to host a midnight feast in the stables, but in order to do so she must first find and hide some leftovers that could risk her being caught by the teachers. Elsewhere, Miss Johnson gives Bill an order mark for riding Thunder outside of hours and a sixth former, Mavis, is looking for someone to accompany her to a singing audition.
| 30 | "The Accident" | Tracey Rooney | Julie Dixon | 4 July 2022 (BBC iPlayer); 29 August 2022 (BYUtv App) |
After being caught again at the stables, Bill has her weekday riding privileges revoked unless she can pass her French test. Miss Grayling agrees to make sure Thunder gets the proper exercise, but after Bill and Darrell then see Thunder without a rider, they ride out and find Miss Grayling has fallen and broken her leg. While the staff discuss who should take charge while Miss Grayling recovers, Miss Johnson informs them the Governors have asked her to do so.
| 31 | "The New Headmistress" | Bruce McDonald | Ella Greenhill | 4 July 2022 (BBC iPlayer); 29 August 2022 (BYUtv App) |
Miss Johnson installs a new set of rules that will guarantee everyone gets demerits but that she believes will turn everyone into proper young ladies. The rules cause Darrell to lose her temper and accidentally break a book, and unless she can repair it she'll lose the right to play in the match, and with the county scout being present she'll also lose the potential for future playing elsewhere.
| 32 | "The Voice" | Bruce McDonald | Rachel Flowerday and Sasha Hails | 4 July 2022 (BBC iPlayer); 29 August 2022 (BYUtv App) |
Sally returns to Malory Towers and learns of all the new rules. Seeing that the rules limit the opportunity for growth Sally decides to write Ms. Grayling and see how soon she can return. Meanwhile the new strict rules could cost Mavis and Irene the chance to audition, and it could cause Mavis to develop an illness.
| 33 | "The Dance" | Bruce McDonald | Rob Kinsman | 4 July 2022 (BBC iPlayer); 29 August 2022 (BYUtv App) |
Miss Johnson puts Gwen in charge of a school dance with the same boys the girls beat in the quiz. Gwen sends Mary-Lou out to find some ivy, and she comes upon a statue that appears to be a quality art piece that she decides to show to Darrell. Meanwhile the boys place some sneezing powder on the cake that could ruin all of Gwen's prep.
| 34 | "The Sisters" | Tracey Rooney | Ella Greenhill | 4 July 2022 (BBC iPlayer); 29 August 2022 (BYUtv App) |
Darrell's sister Felicity visits her at Malory Towers to sit the school's entrance exam and finds the girls frustrated by Miss Johnson's restrictive rules and censoring their letters home. After Darrell defies the rules by taking Felicity swimming and giving her a letter saying what is really happening at the school, Miss Johnson threatens that she will not accept Felicity unless Darrell begins obeying all the rules.
| 35 | "The Hamper" | Tracey Rooney | Shazia Rashid | 4 July 2022 (BBC iPlayer); 29 August 2022 (BYUtv App) |
Alicia sends the girls a basket of goodies and items that can be used for pranks, but when one of the girls decides to use a sock as a fake mouse Miss Johnson decides to punish Darrell by making her miss the lacrosse trials. Darrell lets her temper get the better of her which costs her the opportunity to go to the circus and leads Miss Johnson to confiscate the whole hamper, including some cans of peaches that could help Mavis get over her laryngitis.
| 36 | "The Peaches" | Tracey Rooney | Julie Dixon | 4 July 2022 (BBC iPlayer); 29 August 2022 (BYUtv App) |
Miss Johnson has confiscated the peaches Alicia sent to Darrell, so Darrell and Sally come up with a plan to get them back while the other third form girls are at the circus. Mary-Lou and Irene act like they're sick so they can help Darrell and Sally, but while trying to recover the peaches Darrell learns that Miss Johnson had hid Mavis' and Irene's letters as well as stolen letters from the outgoing mail intended for Miss Grayling.
| 37 | "The Ride" | Tracey Rooney | Rob Kinsman | 4 July 2022 (BBC iPlayer); 29 August 2022 (BYUtv App) |
When Matron is worried Thunder may have developed colic, Bill does everything to try to save him, including confronting Miss Johnson, ignoring Matron's orders, and even stealing another horse to ride to the vet.
| 38 | "The Arrest" | Bruce McDonald | Rachel Flowerday and Sasha Hails | 4 July 2022 (BBC iPlayer); 29 August 2022 (BYUtv App) |
Bill receives word of an art thief in the area and Ron discovers stolen art in the stables. After Miss Johnson dismisses the story, the girls have Bill secretly contact Miss Grayling and set up surveillance with Ron, who identifies Miss Johnson as the theif, though Sally saw her in the school at the same time. Miss Grayling returns to the school and asks Gwen to reveal what she knows, but she is persuaded not to by Miss Johnson, who has Ron arrested for the thefts.
| 39 | "The Thief" | Bruce McDonald | Rachel Flowerday and Sasha Hails | 4 July 2022 (BBC iPlayer); 29 August 2022 (BYUtv App) |
While Miss Johnson makes final preparations for the end-of-year assembly, the girls discover that she has an identical twin and that their paintings have been painted over the stolen artworks, confirming that she is the thief. The girls must prevent Miss Johnson from escaping the school when she realizes she has been discovered, and must also convince Miss Grayling of the evidence they have.

=== Christmas Specials (2022) ===
| No. | Title | Directed by | Written by | Original release date |
|---|---|---|---|---|
| 40 | "The Ghost of Christmas Present" | Bruce McDonald | Rachel Flowerday and Sasha Hails | 4 December 2022 (BYUtv); 5 December 2022 (CBBC) |
The Malory Towers girls are all excited and ready to travel home for Christmas, but not without a festive farewell where Ron brings his Great Granny Mary and his little brother Fred to meet everyone. However, Darrell's family is unable to travel to collect her due to an incoming storm, and Gwen has been told she has to remain at the school because her parents are undergoing a divorce. Things quickly escalate when Mary-Lou, Sally, and Ellen miss the train and Darrell begins to hear a mysterious moaning and groaning from the walls. Note: Both episodes are also shown as a one-hour special with the title, "Christmas at Malory Towers".
| 41 | "The Ghost of Christmas Past" | Bruce McDonald | Rachel Flowerday and Sasha Hails | 4 December 2022 (BYUtv); 6 December 2022 (CBBC) |
Bill sees an SOS from the school and she, Irene and Jean - who were staying with her for Christmas - rush there, while Matron and Miss Grayling are stuck out in the storm. After a confrontation with Darrell, Gwen runs away and Darrell goes in search of her while Sally and Ellen find out the identity of the Ghost, and in the process Mary-Lou gets locked outside. Note: Both episodes are also shown as a one-hour special with the title, "Christmas at Malory Towers".

=== Series 4 (2023) ===
| No. | Title | Directed by | Written by | Original release date |
|---|---|---|---|---|
| 42 | "The Rivers Sisters" | Bruce McDonald | Rachel Flowerday and Sasha Hails | 8 May 2023 (CBBC); 14 May 2023 (BYUtv App) |
Darrell's younger sister Felicity begins her first year at Malory Towers. Now in fourth form, Darrell is selected as head of the lower school and must discipline Felicity and Alicia's troublesome cousin June after they accidentally leave the train to school early and ignore Mr. Parker's instructions to stay and wait for him, at June's insistence, before playing a potentially dangerous prank on the fourth form.
| 43 | "The Doubloon" | Bruce McDonald | Julie Dixon | 9 May 2023 (CBBC); 14 May 2023 (BYUtv App) |
Darrell discovers a doubloon that inspires the first form to seek for a treasure supposedly lost at sea. The final two first form girls, twins Connie and Ruth, arrive, but they have a hard time with any type of separation. Darrell proposes a mentorship program between the first and fourth form girls and, seeing she is in need of more guidance, decides to make herself June's mentor.
| 44 | "The Inter-Tower Match" | Bruce McDonald | Emma Pritchard | 14 May 2023 (BYUtv App); 15 May 2023 (CBBC) |
Four talented first formers vie for three open spots in the lacrosse team for the North vs. West Inter-Tower match. Althought she did not try out, first former Clarissa is given a place on the team after Alicia learns she is a former county player, but she is very reluctant to play, the reason why coming to light after she collapses during the match. Meanwhile, when Irene learns her father has news for her, she fears it may result in her being removed from Malory Towers.
| 45 | "The Essay" | Tracey Rooney | Michelle Bonnard | 14 May 2023 (BYUtv App); 16 May 2023 (CBBC) |
Mr. Parker sets the first form girls a history essay on the pirate Sir Charles Grayling, but when she sees Connie struggling Ruth offers to write essays for them both. When Matron goes on a nighttime errand and leaves Darrell to keep watch over the first form, June leads other girls to sneak out to try and see the ghost of Sir Charles. Afterwards, the new first form choose their head of form.
| 46 | "The Kiss" | Tracey Rooney | Radhika Sanghani | 21 May 2023 (BYUtv App); 22 May 2023 (CBBC) |
It is Irene's birthday and she is given a present from her father by Mam'zelle, who also makes Irene her assistant for the day, leading Irene to speculate why Mam'zelle is suddenly wanting to spend so much time with her. Gwen asks Mary-Lou to have Ron deliver a letter to Clarissa's brother Teddy, but his hesitancy to do so to spare Gwen's feelings reveals feelings Ron has hidden.
| 47 | "The Midnight Surprise" | Tracey Rooney | Shazia Rashid | 21 May 2023 (BYUtv App); 23 May 2023 (CBBC) |
Alicia plans a midnight feast for her, Darrell, and Gwen, this time to be held outside, and in order to get all the supplies she must also invite Fred and Ron. Meanwhile, June accidentally breaks a window while playing tennis, but when she and Felicity can't find the broken window it leads them to a new discovery about the treasure.
| 48 | "The Speech" | Tracey Rooney | Rob Kinsman | 21 May 2023 (BYUtv App); 29 May 2023 (CBBC) |
It is open day for the parents, and as head of lower school Darrell must give a speech in front of the entire school. At the same time, Irene finally learns whom her Father's girlfriend is for certain, and Sally organizes an exhibition lacrosse match against the boys' school, but when they aren't able to attend she pits the girls against the parents instead.
| 49 | "The Connie Affair" | Bruce McDonald | Shazia Rashid | 28 May 2023 (BYUtv App); 30 May 2023 (CBBC) |
Connie continues to struggle with her lesson prep, aggrevating Ruth as she starts to expect her to do it for her, and June gets the recipe for itching powder but her attempts to use it for a prank backfire. After Connie finds her math prep missing and itching powder in her swim cap, she accuses June of being the culprit.
| 50 | "The Strong Heart" | Bruce McDonald | Julie Dixon | 28 May 2023 (BYUtv App); 5 June 2023 (CBBC) |
Clarissa is heartbroken after receiving word her father has sold her pony because she's not well enough to ride and, after going to say a final goodbye, becomes determined to liberate him after seeing the new owner mistreats him. Meanwhile, Irene tries to teach Mam'zelle her and her father's Jewish customs ahead of the wedding, but begins to feel everyone is starting to forget her mother.
| 51 | "The Field Trip" | Bruce McDonald | Emma Pritchard | 28 May 2023 (BYUtv App); 6 June 2023 (CBBC) |
Before Mr. Parker leaves to supervise the first form field trip, he is visited at school by his wife, who begins feeling feint and is advised to rest in the san, along with Clarissa, who is unwell, and Gwen, who stays to supervize while Matron goes to collect Clarissa's medication. However, when there is no one else around, Mrs. Parker starts to go into labor, leaving no option but for Clarissa to go for help while Gwen stays with her. Meanwhile, Darrell learns the secret Felicity and June have been keeping.
| 52 | "The Exam" | Tracey Rooney | Rob Kinsman | 4 June 2023 (BYUtv App); 12 June 2023 (CBBC) |
During the fourth form's exams, the school is evacuated when Gwen discovers one of the home guard's unexploded grenades. Felicity and June are unaccounted for as, at the same time, they are searching for more clues in the secret room, and when they are found are made to reveal the truth to Miss Grayling.
| 53 | "The Terrible Day" | Tracey Rooney | Rachel Flowerday and Sasha Hails | 4 June 2023 (BYUtv App); 13 June 2023 (CBBC) |
With the second half of the map, June and Felicity think they know where the treasure might be hidden, but when Darrell catches them trying to go out to sea, she must take the matter to Miss Grayling. Tired of Connie not letting them have any time apart, Ruth continues playing tricks on her; the rest of the form holds June responsible, but by the time Ruth comes forward, June has gone missing.
| 54 | "The Wedding Day" | Tracey Rooney | Rachel Flowerday and Sasha Hails | 4 June 2023 (BYUtv App); 13 June 2023 (CBBC) |
June attempts to mend her reputation by finding the treasure of Sir Charles, and discovers he might not be whom he has been portrayed as being all along. Darrell searches for June, but when she finds her the two end up stranded in a cave as the tide rises. Meanwhile, Irene's father marries Mam'zelle, but Irene accidentally loses the ring, and in attempting to recover it Felicity discovers her sister and friend are in danger.

=== Series 5 (2024) ===
| No. | Title | Directed by | Written by | Original release date |
|---|---|---|---|---|
| 55 | "The Rivers Sisters Return" | Bruce McDonald | Rachel Flowerday and Sasha Hails | 5 May 2024 (BYUtv App); 10 June 2024 (CBBC) |
Many changes await the Rivers sisters when they arrive for a new year at Malory Towers: Darrell is the new Head of Games; Mary Lou is head of Lower Form; North Tower has a new matron, Matron Shipley; and each of the second form is appointed monitor to one of the fifth form girls. Felicity befriends newcomer Josephine Jones, more commonly known as Jo, who has been spoiled by her father and has a hard time abiding by school rules.
| 56 | "The Monitor Strike" | Bruce McDonald | Shazia Rashid | 5 May 2024 (BYUtv App); 11 June 2024 (CBBC) |
After Clarissa loses personal time and has her school work effected by Gwen's demands of her as her monitor, the second form organizes a strike until a fair and balanced resolution can be made. Meanwhile, archaeologist Mr. Murray asks permission to search for a Neolithic chamber at Malory Towers, and Darrell discovers that it's Miss Grayling's 25th year as head of the school, but also learns what happened when she was previously engaged.
| 57 | "The Circus" | Bruce McDonald | Radhika Sanghani | 5 May 2024 (BYUtv App); 17 June 2024 (CBBC) |
Josephine and Felicity learn the circus is in town, but after they are forbidden from going by Matron, Jo goes to Miss Grayling and loosely interprets her words to say her father can arrange for the circus to visit Malory Towers - with the chaos upon their arrival causing many unforeseen problems.
| 58 | "The Beautiful Game" | Bruce McDonald | Emma Pritchard | 5 May 2024 (BYUtv App); 18 June 2024 (CBBC) |
A big football match is coming up for the boys, who are in need of a new striker as theirs is injured. Clarissa proves to have a talent for the game, but as girls are forbidden from playing football, must come up with a disguise to convince everyone she's a boy. Elsewhere, Darrell and Susan begin helping Mr. Murray search for the hidden secret of Malory Towers.
| 59 | "The Pocket Money" | Jack Jameson | Julie Dixon | 5 May 2024 (BYUtv App); 24 June 2024 (CBBC) |
When Josephine's father sends her £5 pocket money, which she is told she must hand over to Matron, she instead keeps it secret and plans to use it to buy treats for her and the other girls. However, when she loses the money and it is recovered by Matron, who demands to know who it belongs to, Jo schemes to steal it back.
| 60 | "The Fugitives" | Jack Jameson | Julie Dixon | 5 May 2024 (BYUtv App); 25 June 2024 (CBBC) |
Jo and Connie run away after they accidentally take too much money from Matron's office. After learning that Connie purposefully left the money behind, the rest of the second form go looking for it to prove she is not a thief, and when no one comes to her defence Jo questions whether she truly has friends at Malory Towers.
| 61 | "The Babysitter" | Jack Jameson | Emma Pritchard | 5 May 2024 (BYUtv App); 1 July 2024 (CBBC) |
At the same time, Alicia holds cross country tryouts for the second form; Gwen arranges a date with Ron; and Mr. Parker's wife is called away unexpectedly to London. Mr. Parker asks Gwen to watch his daughter while he does test prep in the afternoon, but after a winding accident Gwen leaves the baby with Felicity, which effects her placing in the tryouts.
| 62 | "The Malory Oak" | Sunnie Sidhu | Billie Collins | 5 May 2024 (BYUtv App); 2 July 2024 (CBBC) |
June tries to stop Mr. Murray when he attempts to cut down the Malory Oak tree to try and locate the hidden chamber he is searching for. Meanwhile, after the second form miss a dorm inspection, Matron asks Mr. Parker to instruct the girls on how to clean for themselves, and Jo finally reveals a sad secret she has been keeping.
| 63 | "The Unexpected Visitor" | Sunnie Sidhu | Niki Rooney | 5 May 2024 (BYUtv App); 8 July 2024 (CBBC) |
When Susan's mother visits to inform her she and her father can no longer afford to keep her at Malory Towers, Clarissa and Ruth suggest she apply for a scholarship, and go to questionable lengths to prove she can earn it. Meanwhile, after the second form prank Mam'zelle when she follows Matron's suggestion of being stricter with them, Mam'zelle plans a retaliatory prank on them.
| 64 | "The Race" | Bruce McDonald | Shazia Rashid | 5 May 2024 (BYUtv App); 9 July 2024 (CBBC) |
Darrell's concerns that Alicia is training Felicity too hard for the inter-school cross country race are founded when Felicity goes missing after clashing with Alicia, which leads to unfortunate consequences for Darrell. Meanwhile, Matron is called away for a few weeks to attend her sister's wedding and her replacement arrives at Malory Towers.
| 65 | "The New Matron" | Bruce McDonald | Shazia Rashid | 6 October 2024 (BYUtv App); 4 November 2024 (CBBC) |
When Nurse Jane has to check all the girls in North Tower for lice after an outbreak, the second form do all they can to avoid it. Darrell suspects Nurse Jane is not what she says when she sees her unable to handle the same basic functions that Matron does. At the same time, Darrell is conspiring to sneak out and attend lacrosse tryouts with a weak ankle, but doing so might make her recovery more difficult.
| 66 | "The Maypole" | Bruce McDonald | Julie Dixon | 6 October 2024 (BYUtv App); 5 November 2024 (CBBC) |
Sally and Darrell begin to investigate when they suspect Nurse Jane is hiding something, and Darrell is disheartened when Alicia becomes games captain in her absence. Meanwhile, after Jo accidentally loses the rubber ducks that were to be used for the school's fair, the second form is tasked with coming up with a new activity and decide to organize a maypole dance.
| 67 | "The Investigation" | Bruce McDonald | Ashley McGuire | 6 October 2024 (BYUtv App); 11 November 2024 (CBBC) |
Darrell finds out that Nurse Jane was not sent by the nursing agency, but before she is able to tell anyone Matron Shipley returns early, and Nurse Jane's true identity and her connection to Matron are revealed. Meanwhile, Clarissa becomes concerned for an elderly donkey who is found in the school stables.
| 68 | "The Penalty" | Jack Jameson | Patrick Holmes | 6 October 2024 (BYUtv App); 12 November 2024 (CBBC) |
Ruth's academic results prove to be so high that Mr. Parker and Miss Grayling ask her to consider taking a test that would move her up a whole form at the end of the year, but she is conflicted about doing so without her sister. Meanwhile, the rest of the second form girls enter a football competition, where victory would give them the means to save George the donkey.
| 69 | "The Dream" | Jack Jameson | Emma Pritchard | 6 October 2024 (BYUtv App); 18 November 2024 (CBBC) |
While Darrell asks Felicity to help with her rehabilitation, Gwen holds auditions for the school play. When Felicity and Jo both audition for the lead, Gwen is conflicted about whether to give the part to Jo purely to get her father to provide new costumes, and Felicity must decide whether to commit to the play or continue helping Darrell.
| 70 | "The Birthday Surprise" | Sunnie Sidhu | Billie Collins | 6 October 2024 (BYUtv App); 19 November 2024 (CBBC) |
Ruth and Connie celebrate their birthday and Josephine questions whether they should each have their own separate celebrations. A camera arrives with the twins' gifts, which they begin using before it's confirmed to be for them; it ends up belonging to Mr. Murray, who could end up exposing a harmful prank.
| 71 | "The Challenge" | Sunnie Sidhu | Rob Kinsman | 6 October 2024 (BYUtv App); 25 November 2024 (CBBC) |
Darrell and Alicia agree whichever of them finishes ahead of the other in the inter-tower race will continue as games captain, but after seeing the course Alicia has designed, Darrell is concerned whether she will be able to complete it with her rehabilitated ankle. Meanwhile, Susan and Ruth try to find out if Mr. Murray is being truthful about what he has been finding at the school.
| 72 | "The Poison Pen" | Jack Jameson | Rob Kinsman | 6 October 2024 (BYUtv App); 26 November 2024 (CBBC) |
Problems arise during preparations for the school play: part of the stage is blown away, there is an incident when Connie and June help Jean make the backdrops, and Felicity becomes overwhelmed by Gwen's strict demands of her and the second form during rehearsals, which sees Gwen receive anonymous poison pen letters.
| 73 | "The Last Letter" | Jack Jameson | Sasha Hails | 6 October 2024 (BYUtv App); 2 December 2024 (CBBC) |
When Gwen announces the play will be cancelled unless the writer of the poison pen letters comes forward, the second form suspect Felicity, which causes the real perpetrator to finally come forward out of guilt. Meanwhile, Susan and Ruth get some ideas from Mr. Parker on how the poem he provided could reveal the hidden chamber they've been looking for.
| 74 | "The Chamber" | Jack Jameson | Sasha Hails | 6 October 2024 (BYUtv App); 3 December 2024 (CBBC) |
On the day of the school play Susan and Ruth discover the hidden chamber, but when Ruth gets stuck and Susan asks Mr. Murray for help his own intentions for wanting the treasures in the chamber are revealed. Felicity asks Darrell to prompt her when she begins suffering from stage fright, but Darrell is called upon to save the girls and stop Mr. Murray before it's too late.

=== Series 6 (2025) ===
| No. | Title | Directed by | Written by | Original release date |
|---|---|---|---|---|
| 75 | "The First Day of the Last Year" | Jack Jameson | Sasha Hails | 18 May 2025 (BYUtv App); 9 June 2025 (CBBC) |
It's the first day of Darrell and Sally's final year at Malory Towers, where the vote for head girl ends in a tie. Darrell and Gwen clash after a case of mistaken identity with Clarissa's older brother, Teddy. The third from are joined by a new student, Celeste, who claims to only know French, making it difficult for the others to communicate with her.
| 76 | "The Malory Times" | Jack Jameson | Shazia Rashid | 18 May 2025 (BYUtv App); 10 June 2025 (CBBC) |
Mr. Parker purchases a new typewriter to relaunch the Malory Times newspaper and asks the third formers to submit poems about the school for it. There is difference of opinion over who should be the newspaper's editor, Jean discovers the original Malory girls left a time capsule somewhere in the school, and Alicia writes an article that reignites her feud with Darrell.
| 77 | "Le Petit Paris" | Jack Jameson | Billie Collins | 18 May 2025 (BYUtv App); 16 June 2025 (CBBC) |
Celeste is upset to learn she has to stay at Malory Towers for the whole term and tries to get sent home by feigning illness, leading the rest of the third form to believe she is feeling homesick. Meanwhile, Miss Grayling suggests Mary-Lou's future career may be in teaching and arranges for her to teach with Mam'Zelle to see if it is something she wishes to pursue.
| 78 | "The Band" | Jack Jameson | Emma Pritchard | 18 May 2025 (BYUtv App); 17 June 2025 (CBBC) |
Ron asks Irene to write a song for his new band, interrupting her preparation for her exam for the Conservatoire, which falls on the same day as the band's performance. At the same time Gwen, who is feeling jealous that Ron has invited all of the sixth formers, is tasked with supervising the third form while Alicia is sitting her Oxford exam, and Felicity and June continue to search for clues to the location of the time capsule.
| 79 | "The Birthday" | Bruce McDonald | Rob Kinsman | 18 May 2025 (BYUtv App); 23 June 2025 (CBBC) |
Sally asks Matron Shipley if she can shadow her to learn the skills needed to be a nurse, but when Matron keeps making mistakes she gets Darrell to help her identify the reason why. Meanwhile, Celeste is ready to celebrate her birthday, but she begins to fear things are wrong back home when she doesn't hear from her mother.
| 80 | "The Nurse" | Bruce McDonald | Julie Dixon | 18 May 2025 (BYUtv App); 24 June 2025 (CBBC) |
In the aftermath of a fire in school stables, Celeste tries to convince everyone she started it intentionally so she can be sent home, enraging Clarissa as her beloved pony was endangered, while the rest of the girls question her motivation. Sally learns Matron Shipley admitted to Celeste that she cannot see well and has to persuade her to inform Miss Grayling.
| 81 | "The Debate" | Bruce McDonald | Patrick Homes | 18 May 2025 (BYUtv App); 30 June 2025 (CBBC) |
Following a series of disputes between the sixth and third forms, Mr. Parker proposes a debate between the two to discuss why older forms get more responsibilities and see whether any changes should be made. Elsewhere, after Matron's Shipley's departure, Gwen is reluctantly put in charge of the third form's laundry, but does all she can to try and pass on the responsibility.
| 82 | "The Ward" | Bruce McDonald | Billie Collins | 18 May 2025 (BYUtv App); 1 July 2025 (CBBC) |
When former Matron Kathleen visits Malory Towers, Gwen hopes to persuade her to resume her position. However, Matron left the school to raise her young ward, Nancy, who has Down syndrome, and is concerned if she will adapt to life at Malory Towers and whether the other girls would accept her despite her differences.
| 83 | "The Best Friend" | Jack Jameson | Wally Jiagoo | 18 May 2025 (BYUtv App); 7 July 2025 (CBBC) |
Josephine is conflicted when Celeste is to return to France following her mother's recovery. She is asked to let Celeste know that her mother is going to call, but a time zone difference leads to a misunderstanding. Meanwhile, Nancy comes up with the idea of publishing a poster to discover who took the time capsule, but when Fred reveals he was the one who discovered it some additional bad news awaits.
| 84 | "The Photograph" | Jack Jameson | Julie Dixon | 18 May 2025 (BYUtv App); 8 July 2025 (CBBC) |
On the day of Irene's final concert, letters from the Conservatoire and Oxford arrive; while Irene has been accepted, the news isn't good for Alicia. Feeling devastated, Alicia retreats to the cellar, and when Darrell goes to retrieve her they become trapped, where they make a big discovery that leads to Alicia making a similar big discovery about herself.

=== Series 7 (2025) ===
| No. | Title | Directed by | Written by | Original release date |
|---|---|---|---|---|
| 85 | "The Spelling Bee" | Jack Jameson | Shazia Rashid | 4 October 2025 (BYUtv App); 20 October 2025 (CBBC) |
Darrell begins her final term at Malory Towers and is asked by Miss Grayling to organize a fun and educational activity for the third form. After deciding on a spelling bee, the sixth form are made to take part as well, which puts Darrell in competition with Felicity. Elsewhere, when Gwen and her father have a disagreement over her attending finishing school, Miss Grayling questions if it is the right thing for her.
| 86 | "The Champions" | Bruce McDonald | Sasha Hails | 4 October 2025 (BYUtv App); 21 October 2025 (CBBC) |
Clarissa organizes a charity lacrosse match between Malory Towers and her older brother's school, Thackerton Boys, to prove to him that girls can be just as good at sport as boys. After Clarissa makes Nancy the team's goaltender after an impressive tryout, Mr. Parker is worried the Thackerton Boys will be too rough on her.
| 87 | "The Movie Star" | Jack Jameson | Patrick Homes | 4 October 2025 (BYUtv App); 27 October 2025 (CBBC) |
When Gwen learns that her favorite actor, Lily Vernon, is performing on stage nearby, she conspires on how to get her to come to Malory Towers and possibly reunite with her cousin, Miss Grayling. Meanwhile, tired of being made to eat carrotts, Nancy and Susan conspire to get rid of the school's supply.
| 88 | "The Riding Mistress" | Bruce McDonald | Emma Pritchard | 4 October 2025 (BYUtv App); 28 October 2025 (CBBC) |
Bill is distraught when she learns Thunder has been put up for sale by her mother, who wants her daughter to enter debutante season. When the two can't reach an agreement, Bill determines she must come up with other plans. Meanwhile, when Lily Vernon starts as the school's new theatre teacher, Matron tries to join in as the third form act out her favorite play, The Tempest.
| 89 | "The Scoop" | Bruce McDonald | Rob Kinsman | 4 October 2025 (BYUtv App); 3 November 2025 (CBBC) |
A reporter comes to Malory Towers and Jean, insterested in becoming a journalist, asks to meet him. She wrties an article on the history of the school to show him, which the reporter publishes as his own work, angering Lily Vernon, who starts to believe Malory Towers is her family's property. Elsewhere, Darrell and Alicia attempt to prove to the third form that they still are the best at pranks.
| 90 | "The Shoot" | Bruce McDonald | Julie Dixon | 4 October 2025 (BYUtv App); 4 November 2025 (CBBC) |
Tensions are still high between Miss Grayling and Lily Vernon, who questions staying at Malory Towers when she is told she must attend a teaching academy. The third form try to convince her to stay by suggesting they make a film together. Meanwhile, Gwen gets a lesson in mechanics when Mr. Parker enlists her to help fix his auto coach.
| 91 | "The Intruder" | Jack Jameson | Emma Pritchard | 4 October 2025 (BYUtv App); 10 November 2025 (CBBC) |
While the rest of the school are away on a theatre trip, Mary Lou volunteers to stay behind and keep watch over Felicity, June and Clarissa, who are in the san with an illness, but disobey orders to stay in bed. Felicity sees someone in the school in a Malory Towers uniform and she and June set out to find out who it is and what they are up to.
| 92 | "The Abandoned Cottage" | Jack Jameson | Shazia Rashid | 4 October 2025 (BYUtv App); 11 November 2025 (CBBC) |
The third form come upon an abandoned cottage in the school grounds, which Josephine investigates and discovers Lily Vernon is living there, claiming that she has nowhere left to go. When Jo offers to bring her food from the school, Vernon uses her influence over Jo to have her recover another item that could allow her to claim Malory Towers as her own.
| 93 | "The Traitor" | Bruce McDonald | Rachel Flowerday | 4 October 2025 (BYUtv App); 17 November 2025 (CBBC) |
Gwen gets a letter saying she's been accepted to finishing school and decides to skip out on her final exam. Her father arrives and tries to tell her she won't be going, but Gwen refuses to listen, leading to a shocking revelation. Meanwhile, Lily Vernon forges a will that will give her Malory Towers and asks for Jo's help to make it look authentic.
| 94 | "The Last Day of Malory Towers" | Bruce McDonald | Sasha Hails | 4 October 2025 (BYUtv App); 18 November 2025 (CBBC) |
It's the final day at Malory Towers for Darrell and company, who all wonder how to remain in contact once they aren't together. Gwen confesses her love for Ron and decides to enter the navy so she can remain close to him. After Lily Vernon reveals she plans on turning Malory Towers into a hotel and golf course once school has concluded, Darrell has to work fast to prove that she forged the will.

== Production ==
In July 2019, it was announced in a press release that CBBC and Family Channel had commissioned a TV series adaptation of Enid Blyton's book series Malory Towers. It was also announced that WildBrain would handle international distribution outside the United Kingdom. Sasha Hails and Rachel Flowerday would adapt the series for television with Rebecca Rycroft and Bruce McDonald directing. From DHX Media, Josh Scherba, Anne Loi and Michael Goldsmith are executive producing and Angela Boudreault is producing. From King Bert Productions, Jo Sargent is executive producing and Grainne McNamara is producing.

=== Principal photography ===
Principal photography began in Toronto, Ontario, Canada in summer 2019 and later moved to the two South West England ceremonial counties Cornwall (only in the town of Bodmin) and Devon (only at Hartland Abbey), with the latter serving as the exterior location of the boarding school.

== Release ==
CBBC released a teaser trailer on 20 March 2020 with the announcement that the series would premiere on 6 April 2020. The entire first series of episodes was available to view early on BBC iPlayer as of 23 March to viewers in the UK with a TV licence. The first two episodes aired on Family Channel in Canada that 1 July. The second season was also released in its entirety on the BBC iPlayer on 22 November 2021, with broadcasts expected on CBBC in 2022.

Malory Towers began airing on BYUtv on Sundays in America on 13 September 2020. Beginning with the Christmas special BYUtv took over as the premiere station for most episodes, though CBBC would premiere a few.

== Reception ==
=== Critical reception ===
Malory Towers has garnered critical acclaim (with The Guardian calling the adaptation "absolutely ripping" and The Independent calling the series "a throughly modern take" of the classic book series). Victoria Legal at The Times picked the series' debut episode as her pick of the week, calling the series a "gift [that is] absolutely true to the spirit of the originals ... escapist, nostalgic and as glorious a treat as a midnight feast". Other favorable reviews came from Good Housekeeping, The Daily Telegraph and The Daily Mail with the last reviews giving Malory Towers four stars.

=== Accolades and awards ===
Malory Towers was nominated in 2022 for a Rose d'Or in the Children and Youth category. The series was nominated for four Children's and Family Emmy Awards and was nominated in six categories for the 2025 Children's and Family Emmy Awards, including an acting nomination both years for Ella Bright. Amanda Lawrence won in 2025 in the supporting performer category for her performance as Matron Shipley. The series was nominated in five categories for the 2026 Children's and Family Emmy Awards, including acting nominations for Danya Griver, Ellie Goldstein and April V. Woods.

Malory Towers was also nominated for three Canadian Screen Awards across the 2021 and 2023 ceremonies.
