= Ella Bright =

British and American actress (born 2006)

- Born: November 27, 2006 (age 19); New York City, U.S.
- Citizenship: United States; United Kingdom
- Occupation: Actress
- Years active: 2015–present

Ella Bright (born November 27, 2006) is an American-British actress and singer. She began acting as a child. For her performance in the CBBC adaptation of Malory Towers (2020–2025), she received Children's BAFTA and Emmy Award nominations. She has since starred in the Prime Video series Off Campus (2026–present).

== Early life ==
Ella Bright was born on November 27, 2006, in New York City and grew up in North London. Her father is from Oklahoma, and her mother is from California. She holds dual British and American citizenship. Bright attended South Hampstead High School and completed her A Levels in 2025. As a child, she took performing arts classes in acting, singing, and dance.

== Career ==
Bright made her television debut in a 2015 episode of the TNT crime drama Legends. She made her West End debut in 2017 as Lily Potter Jr. in Harry Potter and the Cursed Child at the Palace Theatre. In 2018, Bright made her feature film debut in the mystery comedy Holmes & Watson.

In 2020, Bright began starring as Darrell Rivers in the CBBC adaptation of Malory Towers, based on the books by Enid Blyton. For her performance, she received a nomination for the British Academy Children's Awards Young Performer award in 2022 and nominations for Outstanding Lead Performer at the Children's and Family Emmy Awards in 2023 and 2024.

Bright portrayed young Catherine Middleton in an episode of the final season of the Netflix historical drama The Crown in 2023, appearing in a fictional flashback in which the future Princess of Wales meets her future mother-in-law, Diana, Princess of Wales (portrayed by Elizabeth Debicki).

In 2025, Bright was cast as Hannah Wells in the Amazon Prime Video series Off Campus, an adaptation of the novel series by Elle Kennedy. On July 23, 2026, Bright released a duet version of "Baby Now That I Found You" with Irish singer Niall Horan; the song was taken from the Off Campus soundtrack.

In August 2026, Bright was reportedly cast as 'Diane' in the indie film 'Gable' alongside Finn Cole, Ben Foster, Mireille Enos and Jake Picking.

In September 2026, Bright was cast in Sony Pictures' coming-of-age comedy ‘Narcs’ alongside Mason Thames. The movie is scheduled to be released in August 2027.

== Filmography ==
=== Film ===
Year	Title	Role	Notes
2018	Holmes & Watson	Bridgette	
TBA	Gable	Diane	currently in post-production
2027	Narcs		currently in production

=== Television ===
Year	Title	Role	Notes
2015	Legends	Clarissa Graves	Episode: "The Legend of Terrence Graves"
2020–2025	Malory Towers	Darrell Rivers	Main role; 93 episodes
2022	Christmas at Malory Towers	Darrell Rivers	Television special
2023	The Crown	Young Kate Middleton	Episode: "Alma Mater"
2026–present	Off Campus	Hannah Wells	Main role; 8 episodes

=== Video game ===
Year	Title	Role	Notes
2024	Malory Towers: Secret Diary Adventure	Darrell Rivers	

=== Podcast ===
Year	Title	Role	Notes
2021	Tales from Malory Towers	Darrell Rivers	10 episodes

== Discography ==
=== Charted songs ===
List of charted songs, with year released, selected chart positions, and album name shown
Title	Year	Peak chart positions	Album
Title	Year	NZ Hot	Album
"Baby Now That I Found You"	2026	17	Off Campus: The Mixtape
"Girl That I Am"	2026	28	Off Campus: The Mixtape
"Cherry Pie"	2026	19	Non-album songs
"Baby Now That I Found You" (with Niall Horan)	2026	30	Non-album songs

== Awards and nominations ==
Award	Year	Category	Work	Result	Ref.
British Academy Children's Awards	2022	Young Performer	Malory Towers	Nominated	
Children's and Family Emmy Awards	2023	Outstanding Lead Performer	Malory Towers	Nominated	
Children's and Family Emmy Awards	2024	Outstanding Lead Performer	Malory Towers	Nominated	
Gold Derby TV Awards	2026	Best Drama Actress	Off Campus	Nominated	
Gold Derby TV Awards	2026	Breakthrough Performer of the Year	Off Campus	Nominated	
