= Jamie Clarke (adventurer) =

Canadian adventurer, author, filmmaker, actor, and public speaker

- Born: 1968 (age 57–58); Calgary, Alberta, Canada
- Occupation: Adventurer
- Known for: Everest climber, public speaker and advocate for the outdoors

Jamie Clarke (born 1968) is a Canadian mountaineer, filmmaker, actor, and public speaker. He has stood on top of Mount Everest twice in 1997 and 2010, climbed the Seven Summits, and is one of the few westerners who have crossed The Empty Quarter on camels. In 2019, Clarke crossed the Mongolian desert, travelling east to west, with his son Khobe. They travelled on motorbikes, then summited Khüiten Peak, the highest mountain in Mongolia.

Clarke has developed a career as a public speaker and media personality, drawing on his adventure and business experiences. He is a regular contributor to CBC Calgary on hiking and camping. He has also coached mental toughness, helping the Canadian national hockey team in 2018 in PyeongChang, and working with the Washington Capitals on their way to the Stanley Cup Final in 2018. Until their closure in 2017, Clarke operated two outdoor equipment retail businesses, The Out There Adventure Centre and LiveOutThere.com.

Clarke lives in Calgary, AB, with his family.

== Early life ==
Clarke was born in Calgary, Alberta, and as a child spent time hiking and skiing with his family in the Rocky Mountains. As a teenager he started competitive cross-country skiing and enjoyed national success.

== Mount Everest ==
Clarke's first attempt on Everest in 1991 was with the "Climb for Hope" expedition. The team of 21 climbers reached 25,000 ft on a north side ascent before bad weather turned them back.

Clarke's second attempt was in 1994 with the "Lungs Without Limits" expedition. Because the expedition was in support of the Alberta chapter of the Canadian Lung Association, the team climbed without bottled oxygen. Approaching from the north, the team of 14 made it within 150m of the summit before altitude sickness and bad weather forced them to descend.

Clarke summited Everest for the first time on 23 May 1997 on a south side approach. In 2010 Clarke returned to Everest to summit a second time as part of the "Climb With Us" expedition. The team of six summited 17 May 2010. The expedition was designed to test the HanesBrands "Super Suit".

== The Seven Summits ==
Between 1993 and 2008 Clarke summited each of the Seven Summits:

- Aconcagua (1993)
- Mount McKinley (1996)
- Mount Everest (1997)
- Mount Kilimanjaro (2001)
- Mount Elbrus (2005)
- Vinson Massif (2006)
- Carstensz Pyramid (2008)

== The Empty Quarter ==
Following his 1997 Mount Everest Summit, Clarke set out to cross The Empty Quarter, by camel, a 1,126 km journey through Oman, Saudi Arabia, and ending at Abu Dhabi, in the United Arab Emirates. Prior to embarking on the crossing of the desert, Clarke travelled to London to visit Sir Wilfred Thesiger KBE, DSO, FRAS, FRSL, FRGS. Clarke was accompanied by his brother Leigh, his friend Bruce, and three Bedouin guides. The expedition took 40 days. During the trek, Clarke and his brother ate one of the camels they had been riding.

== Public speaking, writing, and media ==
Clarke began public speaking in 1987, and began speaking professionally in 1992. He speaks at schools, corporate conferences, meetings, and universities, and has spoken all over the world. Clarke is represented by Keppler Speakers Bureau.

Clarke co-authored The Power of Passion (re-published as Above All Else: The Everest Dream) with Alan Hobson after Clarke's 1997 Everest summit. Following his expedition across The Empty Quarter, Clarke wrote and released From Everest to Arabia: The Making of an Adventuresome Life, chronicling the journey.

Clarke has been a regular columnist for CBC Radio Calgary's The Homestretch since July 2013. His weekly segment is called "Get Out There" and focuses on getting outside and being active.

Clarke appeared in two 1986 motion pictures; Rad as Luke and Hyper Sapien as Leo.

== Business ventures ==
In 2003 Clarke and George Achilleos opened the Out There Adventure Centre in Calgary. It is high-end outdoor apparel and gear store. In 2009 Clarke and Achilleos expanded their outdoor business online, opening LiveOutThere.com, an online outdoor retailer serving the Canadian market. Initially, LiveOutThere.com was intended to be an online community for outdoor enthusiasts, but after two years the website was switched to a focus on e-commerce. LiveOutThere.com was listed as No. 39 on the 2013 Profit Magazine Hot 50.

== Honors and awards ==
- Nominated for the Order of Canada
- Three-time Canadian Junior Cross-Country Ski Champion

== See also ==
- List of Mount Everest summiters by number of times to the summit
