= Denver Academy =

Private school in Colorado, US

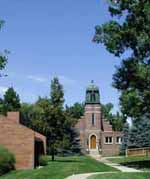
- Denver Academy Historic Library from the Quad

Location
- 4400 E. Iliff Ave. Denver, Colorado 80222; United States; 39°40′25″N 104°56′12″W

Information
- Type: Independent
- Established: 1972 (54 years ago)
- CEEB code: 060396
- Dean: Mark Wood (High School) and Lori Hull (Lower School | Grades 1-8)
- Head of school: Mark Twarogowski
- Grades: 1-12
- Average class size: 8-15 Students
- Student to teacher ratio: 1:7
- Campus size: 21 acres (8.5 ha)
- Campus type: suburb
- Color
- Athletics: Mile High League
- Athletics conference: CHSSA 3A, 2A
- Mascot: Mustang
- Affiliation: Association of Colorado Independent Schools / National Association of Independent Schools
- Website: www.denveracademy.org

Denver Academy is an independent, private day school serving grades 2-12 in Denver, Colorado.

Denver Academy is a registered 501(c)(3).

== School History ==
Denver Academy was founded in 1972, and occupied a schoolhouse in the Washington Park area of Denver until relocating to a 22-acre (8.9 ha) historic property in southeast Denver in 2001. It started out as a schoolhouse with only 36 students and 5 teachers. The headmaster, headmaster Knott, oversaw the school for 20 years, before Jim Loan took over in 1992. In 1984, Denver Academy purchased an elementary school near Washington Park, being the first time a private school purchased a DPS facility. The school saw a steady growth in enrollment, reaching 300 in 1996. In 2000, the school purchased Bethesda campus and transitioned the school to the new campus in 2001. In 2004, Richardson Hall was built, and in 2008, Kevin Smith became headmaster, serving only 5 years until Mark Twarogowski became headmaster in 2013. On April 8th, 2017 a 17 year old boy named Paul Kinningham feel off the roof of the school while playing with other teenagers resulting in a fatal accident. In 2018, the James E. Loan Athletic Center was built, and in 2023, the Louise McCabe Performing Arts Center was built.

== Campus History ==
The campus upon which Denver Academy resides has been both a mental and Tuberculosis hospital. The first building, the Administration Building, was built in 1910, making it over a hundred years old. It started as a Tuberculosis hospital, originally named Bethesda. In 1925, the Chapel for which the school is renowned for, was constructed. a little under $20,000 was provided to build the Chapel. According to Landmark Ordinance, the Chapel and Gateway Structures (which were built in the 1930's) has prominent Dutch architecture, as seen in its stair-step design and red tile roofs. The Chapel was recognised as a landmark in 2000. Over the years, more buildings were added, and in 1948, the hospital transitioned from treating tuberculosis to aiding mental health. Denver Academy then took over the campus in 2000/2001. Since then some new buildings have been added, most recently being the new Theatre that finished construction in 2023. due to a long history with being a sanitorium, many of the school's buildings are rumored to be haunted with ghosts. the majority of them have been spotted in the Chapel and Middle School Upstairs. All in all, the school's campus has a rich history full of all kinds of secrets.

== Divisions ==
The school is organized into four different divisions, each according to grade level

- Lower School (grades 1-5)
- 6th Grade
- Middle School (grades 7-8)
- High School (grades 9-12)

== Athletics ==
Denver Academy is in CHSAA 3A and 2A divisions and is the Mile High League.

=== Middle school ===	=== High school ===		
Boys Baseball	Boys Baseball		
Boys Basketball	Boys Basketball		
Coed Cross Country	Coed Golf		
Coed Recreational Golf	Boys Soccer		
Coed Soccer	Coed Cross Country		
Coed Track	Coed Track		
Girls Basketball	Girls Basketball		
Girls Volleyball	Girls Volleyball		
	Coed Knowledge Bowl		
	Coed Mtn Biking	−	Coed Rock Climbing
