= The Two Lips =

American musical duo

The Two Lips (formerly known as The Tulips) is an indie pop/dream pop duo based in Los Angeles, composed of best friends Jewlz (also spelled Julz) and Andrea. From their shared Mexican heritage and Jewlz's Filipina background, they are able to combine elements of bedroom pop with polished production intended for live performance while also drawing in themes of womanhood, identity, and personal growth. They gained initial recognition through digital platforms and have since released a series of singles that contributed to their growing visibility in the independent music scene.

== Background and Formation ==
Before coming together, Jewlz was studying music production at LA Film and Andrea was teaching preschool while finishing her master's degree in early childhood education. Both women were solo artists at the time but wanted to find a partner to make music with. Both women recognized that it was a lot easier to make and produce music with someone else.

They met online during 2022, and Jewlz and Andrea first connected their shared musical and aesthetic tastes. In late 2023, they formed a musical project under the name The Tulips. Soon after, they rebranded to The Two Lips due to trademark issues. Both artists come from multicultural backgrounds; Jewlz is Filipina, and Andrea is Mexican American. They cite personal identity as a component of their songwriting approach.

They built much of their early work in bedroom pop style, producing and writing in their own spaces before transitioning to a fuller band setup for live performances. Their initial work was created in home studios, and early releases circulated primarily through social media, especially TikTok, where their music found a wider audience.

== Career and Releases ==
=== Initial Recognition ===
In 2024, The Two Lips released the single “Still Love You (Todavia),” which became a breakthrough track, gaining over 30 million streams on Spotify. Their success was maintained through virality on TikTok and playlist features, which helped raise their profile in the indie/pop space. The song marked a significant increase in their following and introduced them to a broader audience.

=== “Talk” and Label Debut ===
In June 2025, The Two Lips released “Talk” through Island Records, marking their official label debut. The track was produced by Jackson Shanks and Oscar Santander. It reflects on miscommunication in relationships and marks an evolution from their earlier lo-fi pop sound to more polished production. With the help of the record label, they are offered more resources and changed their process for the better. Having a producer now helps them know what areas need changing, compared to the beginning where they were limited to how they want to sound.

=== Growing Popularity, Live Shows, and Tours ===
The duo transitioned from bedroom recording to full-band performances with their debut Kiss & Tell Tour, which included sold-out shows at venues like The Troubadour and El Rey Theatre in Los Angeles. This tour supports their shift from recording in private to performing with a live band and engaging with larger audiences. They've also opened for artists like Sabrina Carpenter and are scheduled to play at festivals such as Coachella in 2026.

Their live shows are noted for emotional vulnerability, stylish aesthetics, and strong fan connection, often blending humor and intimacy on stage.

Spotify and other music streaming services are pushing older songs towards listeners due to its algorithms. Their first song, "favorite apple", gained over 300,000 streams due to Spotify's algorithm pushing it to listeners.

The Two Lips also share more about their collaborative track “Happy For Me” featuring Rebecca Sugar, stating, “‘Happy For Me’ is a song written for us by the talented and amazing, Rebecca Sugar. After meeting for the first time over coffee, we were able to talk about our journeys as artists and the complexities of maintaining every relationship in our lives. After sharing and realizing numerous similarities, we asked Rebecca if we could collaborate on a song. Within 24 hours, she sent us a demo and it was as if she could read our minds. 'Happy For Me' reflects on the bittersweet feelings between love and growth when one partner’s dreams begin to unfold, and the hope that the other will stay close and remain genuinely happy for them through the changes that success brings.” The Two Lips are presently on their headlining Kiss & Tell Tour across North America. The Two Lips will also be making their debut performance at Coachella in 2026.

== Music Styles and Influences ==
The Two Lips are commonly categorized as indie pop and dream pop. Their music features melodic vocals, electronic textures, and themes centered on relationships, introspection, and emotional expression. They have cited artists such as The Marias, Clairo, and Lily Allen as influences.

The duo have explained that there are very little disagreements between each other and most of the processes go smoothly because of this. The Two Lips believe that they "get each other" and that most disagreements happen over lyrics and melody choices.

Lyrically, the duo often explores themes of womanhood, emotional vulnerability, relationships, communication struggles, and personal growth. In interviews, they mention drawing inspiration from their own experiences and aiming for relatability. Jewlz is described as being more picky when it comes to the lyrics and knows what she wants for the band. Jose Homicide, Jewlz's boyfriend, helps with the mixing.

Visually, The Two Lips present themselves with a visually curated aesthetic that blends softness with surrealism. Their music videos and photos often feature moody lighting, vintage inspired outfits, and symbolic visuals. They prefer dreamy, theatrical compositions that align with their emotional songwriting. Their visuals often explore duality, intimacy, and femininity, echoing the themes in their lyrics and stage presence. They handle most of the video production in Jewlz's room.

== Public Reception ==
The Two Lips have been recognized in press outlets as an emerging act with a strong emotional appeal and growing streaming numbers. They have been featured in a range of music publications, such as Crave Music Magazine and Out Now. Coverage has focused on their rapid rise in the independent music scene, use of bilingual lyrics, and aesthetic presentation. Industry data providers, such as Chartmetric, track a steady increase in their streaming and social media metrics.

The Two Lips admit that receiving negative comments is new to them, and that they find it challenging to deal with the emotional impact. They have mentioned how a single hate comment can make them "spiral" and feel like they are "never going to make music again." They rely on each other for support by providing positive affirmations and motivation to keep going when burnt out. Although they recognize that the comments do help gain them more views, it is hard for them to truly believe that negative comments are helping them. They state that their fans keep them going despite the negative comments.

The positive feedback they get from fans keep them motivated and many listeners comment on how their songs are relatable. The Two Lips interact with fans through the comment feature on apps like TikTok and Instagram by thanking those who provide positive feedback on their lives. Their number of streams and listens are still growing as they transition from a small indie duo to a band signed with a record label.

== Discography ==
=== Singles and Eps ===
do you even know? (2023)

favorite apple (2023)

pretty funny (2024)

Joel (2024)

blossom (2024)

SICK! (2024)

still love you (todavia) (2024)

talk (2025)

clue (2025)

play (2025)

if you said (2025)

girl, c’mon! (2025)

santa baby (2025)
