= Elle Kennedy =

Canadian novelist

- Kennedy at a book signing in Toronto in March 2026.
- Born: January 19, 1982 (age 44); Toronto, Ontario, Canada
- Occupation: Author
- Writing career
- Genres: Romance; Romantic suspense; Young Adult; New Adult
- Notable work: Off Campus
- Notable awards: RITA award – Contemporary Romance: Mid-Length; 2016 Him
- Website: www.ellekennedy.com

Elle Kennedy (born January 19, 1982) is a Canadian author of contemporary romance and romantic suspense. She is a Romance Writers of America RITA Award winner.

== Early life ==
From a young age, Kennedy knew she wanted to be a writer and began actively pursuing her passion in her teenage years. She received her B.A. in English from York University in 2005.

== Career ==
Kennedy has published books with Harlequin Enterprises, New American Library, Berkley, and Entangled Publishing. She has had multiple titles on the USA Today, The New York Times and The Wall Street Journal bestsellers lists. Her Off-Campus series has appeared on multiple bestsellers lists and was released in over twenty countries worldwide.

== Bibliography ==
=== Prep Series ===
1. Misfit (2023)
2. Rogue (2023)

=== Avalon Bay Series ===
1. Good Girl Complex (2022)
2. Bad Girl Reputation (2022)
3. The Summer Girl (2023)

=== Off Campus Series ===
1. The Deal (2015)
2. The Mistake (2015)
3. The Score (2016)*
4. The Goal (2016)
5. The Legacy (2021)

=== Briar U Series (spinoff from Off Campus) ===
1. The Chase (2018)
2. The Risk (2019)*
3. The Play (2019)
4. The Dare (2020)

=== Campus Diaries Series (spinoff from Off Campus) ===
1. The Graham Effect (2023)
2. The Dixon Rule (2024)
3. The Charlie Method (2025)
4. Love Song (2026)
5. Bad Idea (2027)

=== Killer Instincts ===
1. Midnight Rescue (2012)
2. Midnight Alias (2013)
3. Midnight Games (2013)
4. Midnight Pursuits (2014)
5. After Midnight (Novella)
6. Midnight Action (2014)
7. Midnight Captive (2015)
8. Midnight Revenge (2016)
9. Midnight Target (2017)

=== Harlequin Romantic Suspense ===
1. Missing Mother-To-Be (2011)
2. Millionaire's Last Stand (2011)
3. The Heartbreak Sheriff (2012)

=== Silhouette Romantic Suspense ===
1. Her Private Avenger (2010)
2. Silent Watch (2009)

=== Harlequin Blaze ===
1. Witness Seduction (2011)
2. Body Check (2009)

=== Out of Uniform Series ===
1. Heat of the Moment (2008)
2. Heat of Passion (2009)
3. Heat of the Storm (2009)
4. Heat it Up (2010)
5. Heat of the Night (2010)
6. The Heat is On (2011)
7. Feeling Hot (2012)
8. Getting Hotter (2012)

=== Him Series with Sarina Bowen ===
1. Him (2016)
2. Us (2017)
3. Epic (2020)

=== Standalones ===
- Girl Abroad (2024)

== Adaptations ==
Kennedy's standalone romance book, Girl Abroad, was announced to be in the works in May 2024 with Chris Van Dusen adapting it. Her Off Campus series was adapted by Amazon MGM Studios titled under the same name. The first season debuted on May 13, 2026.

== Awards and nominations ==
- 2016 – RITA Winner – Contemporary Romance: Mid-Length for Him co-written with Sarina Bowen
- 2015 – People's Choice Awards Best Romance nominee for The Deal
- 2015 – Goodreads Best Romance finalist for The Deal and The Score
- 2014 – RITA Finalist – Romantic Suspense for Midnight Action
- 2010 – RITA Finalist – Contemporary Series Romance: Suspense/Adventure for Silent Watch
- 2009 – Romantic Times Reviewers' Choice Best Book Awards – Nominee for Silent Watch
