= Brontosaurus Breath =

26th episode of the 1st season of Doc McStuffins

- Doc McStuffins episode
- Episode no.: Season 1 Episode 26b
- Directed by: Norton Virgien
- Written by: Carin Greenberg
- Story by: Jeff McGrath
- Editing by: Seamas O’Toole; Alan Maran
- Original air date: May 3, 2013
- Running time: 11 minutes 18 seconds

Episode chronology
← Previous "Bronto Boo-Boos"	Next → "Doc McStuffins Goes McMobile"

Brontosaurus Breath is the B segment of the twenty-sixth episode of the first season of the American animated children's television series Doc McStuffins. The episode was written by Carin Greenberg, and directed by Norton Virgien. The episode premiered on Disney Jr on May 3, 2013. The episode was made to educate children on proper dental hygiene. The episode was included on the “Time For Your Checkup” DVD release on May 7, 2013. On August 13, 2013, the episode was adapted into a children's book, illustrated by Sheila Sweeny Higginson, as part of Disney's “World of Reading” series.

== Plot ==
The episode starts with Doc and Marcus playing in the backyard. Donny calls them in to eat lunch. While at the table, Marcus feeds Bronty his Salami sandwich. After lunch is over, Marcus goes to soccer practice and Doc goes back to playing. Lambie wants to give all the other toys cuddles, and has Bronty carry her. Everyone avoids them, and they can not find out why. Eventually, they find out Bronty has bad breath.

Doc takes Bronty in for a checkup. Doc checks Bronty's mouth and finds a piece of Salami from Marcus's sandwich stuck in his teeth. She takes the Salami out, but Bronty's breath still smells bad. Doc tries to brush Bronty's teeth, but he doesn't want her to. Doc convinces Bronty to brush his teeth by throwing a “brushing party.” After the party, Bronty's bad breath is finally gone. Bronty goes back into the backyard and everyone wants to play with him again. The episode ends with Marcus returning from Soccer practice, and Doc telling him he needs to brush his teeth.

== Cast ==
- Kiara Muhammad as Dottie “Doc” McStuffins
- Jadan Betts as Donny McStuffins
- Jeff Fischer as Lenny
- Gary Anthony Williams as Marcus McStuffins
- Kimberly Brooks as Myeisha McStuffins
- Jess Harnell as Chilly
- Jeffrey Brown as Bronty
- Lara Jill Miller as Lambie
- Loretta Devine as Hallie
- Robbie Rist as Stuffy

== Controversy ==
On November 6, 2014, the Christian fundamentalist group One million moms created a petition alleging the episode contained profanity. The petition claims that Bronty said the word “shitty” at one point in the episode. They also alleged the show used a beep to censor a curse in another episode. The group said the show “portrays kids showing disrespect towards parents and adults.” The petition listed ways to contact Disney, and instructed people to email at-the-time Disney CEO, Bob Iger.

On the same day, David Mikkelson wrote an article for Snopes refuting the claim. Mikkelson found two YouTube videos that appeared to show what One Million Moms was referring to. The first video, uploaded on July 29, 2013, shows a clip from Brontosaurus Breath where Bronty appears to say “this is hopeless, horrible, shitty, I mean really, really bad.” Mikkelson said it was more likely Bronty was saying the word “Hideous” before cutting himself off, making it sound like he said “hiddy.” The second video, uploaded on November 2, 2014, shows a clip from the episode “The Super Amazing Ultra Hoppers” with a beeping noise interrupting the episode. Mikkelson said that the beep is more likely to be a broadcasting error. The beep is absent from official releases.

Disney would alter the audio of the episode in future broadcasts and releases. On Disney+, the subtitles read “this is hopeless, horrible, hideo-.”
