= List of Doc McStuffins episodes =

Doc McStuffins is an American educational computer-animated children's television series produced by Brown Bag Films. It was created by Chris Nee and premiered on March 23, 2012, on Disney Channel and Disney Junior. The series is about a girl who can "fix" toys, with help from her toy friends. It features songs written and composed by Michelle Lewis, Kay Hanley, and Dan Petty.

On April 14, 2015, the series was renewed for a fourth season by Disney Junior, which premiered on July 29, 2016.

On November 16, 2016, Doc McStuffins was renewed for a fifth and final season by Disney Junior, which premiered on October 26, 2018.

The series finale aired on April 18, 2020.

== Series overview ==
Season	Segments	Episodes	Originally released	
Season	Segments	Episodes	First released	Last released
1	52	26	March 23, 2012	May 3, 2013
The Doc Files	—N/a	10	July 22, 2013	April 15, 2014
2	72	37	September 6, 2013	September 12, 2015
3	56	29	July 11, 2015	April 25, 2016
4	50	28	July 29, 2016	March 2, 2018
5	—N/a	16	October 26, 2018	April 18, 2020

== Episodes ==
=== Season 1 (2012–13) ===
- Doc, Lambie, and Stuffy were present in all episodes of this season.
- Chilly was absent from 11 episodes: "Knight Time", "Run Down Race Car", "Tea Party Tantrum", "Blast Off!", "Arcade Escapade", "Stuck Up", "All Washed Up", "Wrap It Up", "Get Set to Get Wet", "To Squeak, or Not to Squeak", and "Brontosaurus Breath".
- Hallie was absent from 4 episodes: "Arcade Escapade", "Stuck Up", "Get Set to Get Wet", and "To Squeak, or Not to Squeak".

No. overall	No. in season	Title	Directed by	Written by	Storyboard by	Original release date	Prod. code	U.S. viewers (millions)
1a	1a	"Knight Time"	Norton Virgien	Sascha Paladino	Andy Kelly	March 23, 2012	103	2.46
Before playing "Save Princess Lambie", Doc discovers that Donny's toy knight, Sir Kirby, is dirty, so he has to take a bath. Absent: Chilly
1b	1b	"A Bad Case of the Pricklethorns"	Norton Virgien	Chris Nee	Akis Dimitrakopoulos	March 23, 2012	103	2.46
Doc diagnoses Boppy, a toy dog bopping bag, when he suddenly gets popped after landing in a rose bush. Note: "A Bad Case of the Pricklethorns" was aired as a sneak peek on March 17, 2012, six days before the series officially premiered.
2a	2a	"Out of the Box"	Norton Virgien	Noelle Wright	Nondas Korodimos	March 23, 2012	102	2.01
Little Jack, a jack in the box, cannot pop up, but he is scared of getting a check-up, so his dad, Big Jack, goes first.
2b	2b	"Run Down Race Car"	Norton Virgien	Kent Redeker	Charles Grosvenor	March 23, 2012	102	2.01
Ricardo Racecar loses his energy during a race due to Donny racing him overnight, so Doc and the crew need to recharge it. Absent: Chilly
3a	3a	"Tea Party Tantrum"	Norton Virgien	Bradley Zweig	Gary Blatchford	March 26, 2012	105	N/A
Doc wonders why Susie Sunshine, a doll, is acting very cranky. Absent: Chilly
3b	3b	"Blast Off!"	Norton Virgien	Kent Redeker	Andy Kelly	March 26, 2012	105	N/A
Doc helps Carlos' toy space alien, Star Blazer Zero, after his arms and legs fall off after a crash in his toy rocket. Absent: Chilly
4a	4a	"Engine Nine, Feelin' Fine!"	Norton Virgien	Chris Nee	Andrei Svislotski	March 27, 2012	101	1.79
Donny thinks that his toy fire engine, Lenny, a.k.a. Engine 9, is broken when it ran out of water in his holding tanks, so Doc refills him.
4b	4b	"The Right Stuff"	Norton Virgien	Kent Redeker	Nondas Korodimos	March 27, 2012	101	1.79
During an adventure game, Stuffy's tail gets ripped, but he won't ask for help, and soon, it gets worse as he loses more stuffing from his tail.
5a	5a	"Gulpy, Gulpy Gators!"	Norton Virgien	Noelle Wright	Andrei Svislotski	March 28, 2012	104	N/A
Doc fixes Gustave, the green gator on Donny's Gulpy Gulpy Gators game, after he eats too many marbles.
5b	5b	"One Note Wonder"	Norton Virgien	Noelle Wright	Jeff McGrath	March 28, 2012	104	N/A
Alma's xylophone toy, Xyla, loses a key by accident while being repaired for a loose screw.
6a	6a	"Arcade Escapade"	Norton Virgien	Noelle Wright	Nondas Korodimos	March 29, 2012	106	1.92
Doc helps a stuffed toy giraffe called Gaby after her leg was torn in an accident in the claw crane machine at the arcade. Absent: Hallie and Chilly
6b	6b	"Starry, Starry Night"	Norton Virgien	Michael Rabb	Jeff McGrath	March 29, 2012	106	1.92
Doc helps Henry's telescope, Aurora, when she suffers from blurry vision.
7a	7a	"Ben/Anna Split!"	Norton Virgien	Ed Valentine	Vitaly Shafirov	March 30, 2012	114	1.78
Ben and Anna, Alma's "Huggy Monkeys", need to be separated after Ben suffered a torn Velcro "hug" patch and needed to recover overnight at the clinic.
7b	7b	"That's Just Claw-ful"	Norton Virgien	Michael Rabb	Charles Grosvenor	March 30, 2012	114	1.78
Doc helps Hermie, her toy crab, after his arm was torn out by Emmie and Alma's new puppy, Rudi.
8a	8a	"A Good Case of the Hiccups"	Norton Virgien	Corey Powell	Gary Blatchford	April 2, 2012	108	2.01
Doc tries to fix Millie the Microphone when she can't stop repeating words.
8b	8b	"Stuck Up"	Norton Virgien	Kent Redeker	Charles Grosvenor	April 2, 2012	108	2.01
When Doc accidentally gets sand in her eye, she finds out what's wrong with Will's toy digger, Riggo, when his scoop gets stuck. Absent: Hallie and Chilly
9a	9a	"Rescue Ronda, Ready for Takeoff"	Norton Virgien	Chris Nee	Tim Spillane	April 3, 2012	107	2.02
Doc has to fix Luca's helicopter, Rescue Ronda, when she can't fly due to getting a little twig from a bush in her propeller.
9b	9b	"All Washed Up"	Norton Virgien	Sascha Paladino	Andy Kelly	April 3, 2012	107	2.02
Donny's toy robot, Robot Ray, learns the importance of following the doctor's orders when he gets wet playing a game. Absent: Chilly
10a	10a	"The New Girl"	Norton Virgien	Michael Rabb	Vittorio Pirajno	April 4, 2012	119	1.90
Doc gets an "action toy" doll from Japan called Kiko from her grandmother, and emphasizes exercise when she finds out that Kiko has weak legs.
10b	10b	"Wrap It Up"	Norton Virgien	Joe Purdy	Gary Blatchford	April 4, 2012	119	1.90
Niles, Donny's toy crane, refuses to have his old bandages removed when they start unraveling. Absent: Chilly
11a	11a	"Rest Your Rotors, Ronda!"	Norton Virgien	Kent Redeker	Nondas Korodimos	April 5, 2012	116	2.23
Rescue Ronda learns how good it is to rest when her propeller is broken and needs time to heal.
11b	11b	"Keep On Truckin'"	Norton Virgien	Sascha Paladino	Vitaly Shafirov	April 5, 2012	116	2.23
Donny's toy truck, Tremaine, learns how to keep still to get repainted.
12a	12a	"Blame it on the Rain"	Norton Virgien	Noelle Wright	Akis Dimitrakopoulos	April 6, 2012	113	3.05
Alma accidentally leaves her stuffed cow, Moo Moo, outside during a downpour and Doc fixes her, but at first, she refuses to go home when she believes that her owner doesn't like her.
12b	12b	"Busted Boomer"	Norton Virgien	Kent Redeker	Andy Kelly	April 6, 2012	113	3.05
Boomer, Emmie's deflated soccer ball, refuses to be re-inflated due to having a fear of needles.
13a	13a	"Dark Knight"	Norton Virgien	Sascha Paladino	Elliot Bour	April 9, 2012	122	2.41
During a sleepover party, Doc discovers that Sir Kirby is afraid of the dark and cures him of his fear.
13b	13b	"Hallie Gets an Earful"	Norton Virgien	Noelle Wright	Patricia Ross	April 9, 2012	122	2.41
Doc helps Hallie hear better after she has trouble hearing.
14a	14a	"Break Dancer"	Norton Virgien	Noelle Wright	Patricia Ross	April 11, 2012	118	2.16
Bella, Doc's ballerina doll, breaks her leg, and finds a lot to do while she waits for it to heal.
14b	14b	"Bubble Monkey"	Norton Virgien	Kent Redeker	Jose Antonio Cerro	April 11, 2012	118	2.16
Doc examines Emmie and Alma's bubble monkey after she stops blowing bubbles.
15a	15a	"Out in the Wild"	Norton Virgien	Ed Valentine	Glen Kennedy	April 13, 2012	120	2.40
Doc helps Robot Ray after injuring his arm when a bluebird drops him off during a camping trip. Doc later refers to having gotten a case of Panic-itis in response to the situation and of this being her first surgery. Note: Chilly's only appearance in this episode was in Robot Ray's imagine spot.
15b	15b	"A Whale of a Time"	Norton Virgien	Chris Nee	Vince James	April 13, 2012	120	2.40
Doc brings a sponge beluga whale toy called Lula back after a visit to the aquarium and helps her grow.
16a	16a	"The Rip Heard Round the World"	Norton Virgien	Chris Nee	Jeff McGrath	April 20, 2012	115	N/A
Lambie accidentally gets ripped by Sir Kirby's toy sword while dancing with Doc.
16b	16b	"Walkie-Talkie Time"	Norton Virgien	Noelle Wright	Jose Manuel Hurtado Martin	April 20, 2012	115	N/A
Doc reunites a walkie-talkie couple, Walter and Gracie, by finding his missing antenna.
17a	17a	"Un-Bur-Able"	Norton Virgien	Kent Redeker	Patricia Ross	May 4, 2012	121	1.42
While playing Astronautball, Stuffy falls into a bush and gets burrs all over his body.
17b	17b	"Righty-on-Lefty"	Norton Virgien	Chris Nee	Andy Kelly	May 4, 2012	121	1.42
Doc helps Awesome Guy, a toy superhero, after she discovers that he can't walk correctly.
18a	18a	"Hallie's Happy Birthday"	Norton Virgien	Sharon Soboil	Vitaly Shafirov	May 18, 2012	125	1.69
It's Hallie's birthday and Doc and the crew throw a surprise party in her honor.
18b	18b	"Shark-Style Toothache"	Norton Virgien	Noelle Wright	Robert Souza	May 18, 2012	125	1.69
Mr. Chomp, Donny's toy shark, has a broken tooth that needs to be repaired, but everyone (except for Doc and Hallie) is afraid of him because of his sharp teeth.
19a	19a	"Awesome Possums"	Brónagh O'Hanlon	Sascha Paladino	Nondas Korodimos	June 1, 2012	126	2.07
Penny's baby, a toy possum named Pip, is lost and Doc and the others frantically search the house for Pip and reunite it with its mother.
19b	19b	"The Bunny Blues"	Norton Virgien	Chris Nee	Vitaly Shafirov	June 1, 2012	126	2.07
Doc discovers Alma's stuffed bunny, Pickles, in a box at a yard sale, but she doesn't have a nose, so Doc tries to find a perfect nose for her.
20a	20a	"Get Set to Get Wet"	Norton Virgien	Kent Redeker	Charlie Grosvenor	June 22, 2012	123	2.45
Doc finds a mermaid doll called Mermaid Melinda in the wading pool and teaches her how to swim. Absent: Hallie and Chilly
20b	20b	"Loud Louie"	Brónagh O'Hanlon	Noelle Wright	Nondas Korodimos	June 22, 2012	123	2.45
A toy cellphone, Louie, has a slight problem with his volume switch, causing him to talk loud.
21a	21a	"Caught Blue-Handed"	Norton Virgien	Kent Redeker	Andrei Svislotski	July 20, 2012	109	2.38
After Donny and Glo-Bo finish finger-painting an "elephant eating blueberries", a mysterious blue rash infects all the toys in the clinic and Doc needs to figure out about what is causing it.
21b	21b	"To Squeak, or Not to Squeak"	Norton Virgien	Chris Nee	Akis Dimitrakopoulos	July 20, 2012	109	2.38
Marvin the Duck lost his squeaker during the water fight at the water park and it's up to Doc, Lambie, and Stuffy to find it. Absent: Hallie and Chilly
22a	22a	"Doctoring the Doc"	Norton Virgien	Chris Nee	Tim Spillane	August 17, 2012	124	2.20
Doc is sick with the flu and Lambie, Stuffy, Hallie and Chilly help Doc get plenty of rest.
22b	22b	"Hot Pursuit"	Norton Virgien	Noelle Wright	Vince James	August 17, 2012	124	2.20
A metal toy police car, Officer Pete, overheats while pursuing the Wicked King.
23a	23a	"Boo-Hoo to You!"	Norton Virgien	Chris Nee	Tim Spillane	October 12, 2012	112	1.65
On Halloween, Doc helps a toy ghost, Sebastian, learn not to be scared of the decorations.
23b	23b	"It's Glow Time"	Norton Virgien	Sascha Paladino	Gary Blatchford	October 12, 2012	112	1.65
Glo-Bo is very tired, weak, and unable to glow, so Doc and her toys need to find a way to get him back his glowing effect.
24a	24a	"Chilly Gets Chilly"	Norton Virgien	Sharon Soboil	Robert Souza	December 7, 2012	117	1.72
Doc is excited to play outside in the snow. Then, Chilly decides to hang out with the snowman that the crew had built, but nearly freezes in the cold. Note: This episode first aired on November 24, 2012, in Canada, but officially premiered in the USA on December 7, 2012.
24b	24b	"Through the Reading Glasses"	Norton Virgien	Kent Redeker	Andy Kelly	December 7, 2012	117	1.72
Doc receives a stuffed toy owl named Professor Hootsburgh from her older cousin, Tisha, but she can't read properly because of her poor eyesight. Note: This episode first aired on November 24, 2012, in Canada, but officially premiered in the USA on December 7, 2012.
25a	25a	"My Huggy Valentine"	Norton Virgien	Noelle Wright	Nondas Korodimos	February 1, 2013	110	1.98
Lambie becomes jealous and heartbroken when Val, a new toy, steals the spotlight from her during the Valentine's Day party at the clinic.
25b	25b	"Dusty Bear"	Norton Virgien	Sascha Paladino	Charlie Grosvenor	February 1, 2013	110	1.98
A teddy bear named Teddy B discovers why Donny doesn't want to play with him.
26a	26a	"Bronto Boo-Boos"	Norton Virgien	Kent Redeker	Akis Dimitrakopoulos	May 3, 2013	111	1.38
When Bronty, a toy Brontosaurus, arrives at the McStuffins household, a mysterious outbreak of injuries affects the other toys due to Bronty playing roughly with them and not realizing it.
26b	26b	"Brontosaurus Breath"	Norton Virgien	Carin Greenberg Baker	Jeff McGrath	May 3, 2013	111	1.38
Doc and the crew wonder why Bronty has a bad case of bad breath so they teach Bronty how to brush his teeth to make it smell nice. Absent: Chilly

=== Season 2 (2013–15) ===
- Doc, Lambie, and Stuffy were present in all episodes of this season.
- Chilly was absent from 1 episode: "Don't Knock the Noggin".
- Hallie was absent from 2 episodes: "Don't Knock the Noggin" and "The Doctor Will See You Now".
- Doc starts a mobile clinic.
- Doc starts a vet clinic at the end of the season.

No. overall	No. in season	Title	Directed by	Written by	Storyboard by	Original release date	Prod. code	US viewers (millions)
27a	1a	"Doc McStuffins Goes McMobile"	Saul Blinkoff	Chris Nee	Jean Texier	September 6, 2013	201	1.71
After discovering that she couldn't fix Maddie's toy mouse, Norton, in the park, Doc's dad builds a mobile clinic for her to fix toys whenever she is away from her clinic.
27b	1b	"Chip Off the Ol' Box"	Dan Nosella	Sascha Paladino	Andy Kelly	September 6, 2013	201	1.71
While practicing their Juggling Jacks Act for Buddy's birthday party, Big Jack hurts his crank after Donny crashes into him while practicing some defensive soccer save moves, leaving him unable to perform.
28a	2a	"Awesome Guy's Awesome Arm"	Dan Nosella	Kent Redeker	Akis Dimitrakopoulos	September 13, 2013	202	1.59
Awesome Guy injures his arm while showing off his awesome strength and Doc orders him to rest up.
28b	2b	"Lamb in a Jam"	Saul Blinkoff	Ed Valentine	Arthur Valencia	September 13, 2013	202	1.59
Lambie got covered with jam while being placed into Doc's backpack due to a faulty sandwich bag. Before going with her to school on "Take Your Toy To School Day", Lambie felt sad and bitter about not going to school with Doc. So she covered Stuffy, who was to take her place for "Take Your Toy To School Day", and to prevent him from going to school with Doc.
29a	3a	"Diagnosis Not Even Close-Is"	Dan Nosella	Robert Vargas	Nondas Korodimos	September 20, 2013	208	1.50
Doc takes the afternoon off from the clinic to help train Emmie's dog Rudi with a new agility training center that Emmie's family bought. So Stuffy and Hallie fill in as doctors while trying to find out why Robot Ray is going out of control. The toys call Doc for help and she succeeds to find the real problem.
29b	3b	"Bronty's Twisted Tail"	Saul Blinkoff	Kent Redeker	Andy Kelly	September 20, 2013	208	1.50
Doc creates a musical group, but Bronty injures his tail after Stuffy crashes into him.
30a	4a	"Frida Fairy Flies Again"	Saul Blinkoff	Kerri Grant	Charles Grosvenor and Vitaly Shafirov	September 27, 2013	203	1.49
Frida Fairy, a fairy-shaped kite who thinks she is a real fairy, rips her wing after crashing into a tree branch and Doc tries to repair her.
30b	4b	"A Tale of Two Dragons"	Dan Nosella	Kent Redeker	Massimiliano Lucania	September 27, 2013	203	1.49
Dragon-Bot, a new state-of-the-art robotic toy dragon, has a problem with his wings popping out, so Doc checks what is causing the problem, but Stuffy becomes jealous over Dragon-Bot being more hi-tech than him.
31a	5a	"Think Pink"	Saul Blinkoff	Story by : Chris Nee; Teleplay by : Ed Valentine	Marten Jonmark	October 3, 2013	204	1.36
Chilly turns pink from Doc's red scarf after being accidentally washed in the washing machine by Doc's dad.
31b	5b	"You Foose, You Lose"	Dan Nosella	Robert Vargas	Juan Carlos Moreno	October 3, 2013	204	1.36
The other players in the Foosball court are ready to play, but Johnny Foosball isn't ready because he is suffering from a sticking problem and is reluctant to tell his teammates about it.
32a	6a	"Leilani's Lu'au"	Saul Blinkoff	Ed Valentine	Richard Bazley	October 17, 2013	206	1.42
Doc receives a solar-powered hula girl named Leilani from her grandmother, but she feels a little homesick for her home in Hawaii so Doc throws a Luau for her.
32b	6b	"Karate Kangaroos"	Dan Nosella	Joe Purdy	Nondas Korodimos	October 17, 2013	206	1.42
Doc helps Angus, a Karate Kangaroo who doesn't want to fight Sidney, his partner, because of his fear of fighting.
33a	7a	"Doc to the Rescue"	Saul Blinkoff	Ed Valentine	Arthur Valencia	October 24, 2013	207	1.34
Doc discovers a fashion doll named Dress-Up Daisy stuck in a tree and tries to calm her down from panicking while rescuing her.
33b	7b	"Don't Knock the Noggin"	Dan Nosella	Sascha Paladino	Andy Kelly	October 24, 2013	207	1.34
Doc helps an action figure named Super Stuntman Steve after he starts malfunctioning from losing his helmet. Absent: Hallie and Chilly
34a	8a	"Disco Dress Up Daisy"	Saul Blinkoff	Sue Rose	Juan Carlos Moreno	November 8, 2013	209	1.65
Disco Dress Up Daisy injures her arm while showboating on roller skates and gets a fashionable pink cast for her arm, but Lambie becomes envious and tries to fake an injury to get a cast for herself. Doc diagnoses her with "I want a boo-boo syndrome" and relates to having had it in the past when her friend Emmie had a cast when she sprains her ankle.
34b	8b	"The Glider Brothers"	Dan Nosella	Jen Hamburg	Massimiliano Lucania	November 8, 2013	209	1.65
The Glider Brothers, two planes named Orville and Wilbur (after the Wright brothers), fly recklessly around the McStuffins household resulting in Wilbur breaking the rubber band that powers his propeller.
35a	9a	"Kirby and the King"	Dan Nosella	Kent Redeker	Akis Dimitrakopoulos	November 15, 2013	210	1.42
Sir Kirby and The Wicked King get stuck together with paste after battling with Donny's cardboard monster, so they try to get unstuck.
35b	9b	"Bubble Monkey, Blow Your Nose!"	Saul Blinkoff	Kent Redeker	Marten Jonmark	November 15, 2013	210	1.42
Doc brings Bubble Monkey to visit Donny to cheer him up after he catches a cold, but Bubble Monkey has a sneezing fit that spreads soap bubble liquid all over the place.
36a	10a	"Professor Pancake"	Saul Blinkoff	Kent Redeker	David Frasquet	November 22, 2013	211	1.66
Doc rescues Professor Hootsburgh after being accidentally trapped behind Doc's toy box and accidentally flattened.
36b	10b	"You Crack Me Up"	Dan Nosella	Kerri Grant	Dan Nosella	November 22, 2013	211	1.66
Gloria the Giggling Gorilla, Donny's new toy, keeps scratching her belly, so Doc investigates the cause of her itch.
37	11	"A Very McStuffins Christmas"	Saul Blinkoff and Dan Nosella	Chris Nee	David Frasquet and Jean Texier	December 1, 2013	205	1.99
An elf named Tobias needs help after accidentally breaking Donny's new toy, Commander Crush, so Doc and the crew go to the North Pole to get a new part. However, Stuffy gets separated from the group, so it's up to Lambie and Chilly to rescue him. Note: This is the first episode to be 22 minutes long.
38a	12a	"The Doctor Will See You Now"	Dan Nosella	Sascha Paladino	Garrett O'Donoghue	December 12, 2013	212	1.50
Dolly, Morton, Carl Chug a Chug, and Fabio, the toys in the waiting room at the doctor's office, receive a check up by Doc after wondering why the children in the clinic don't want to play them. This is the first instance of Doc being called Dottie in the show. Absent: Hallie
38b	12b	"L'il Egghead Feels the Heat"	Saul Blinkoff	Ed Valentine	Nondas Korodimos	December 12, 2013	212	1.50
Professor Hootsburgh challenges Eggie, an electronic learning device, to a face-off to see who's the smartest toy in the McStuffins household, but Eggie overheats and starts malfunctioning.
39a	13a	"The Big Sleepover"	Saul Blinkoff	Sascha Paladino	Dave Pemberton	January 10, 2014	213	1.55
Doc becomes homesick during a sleepover at Emmie and Alma's house, so Stuffy, Lambie, and Pickles try to cheer her up.
39b	13b	"No Sweetah Cheetah"	Dan Nosella	Jennifer Hamburg	Andy Kelly	January 10, 2014	213	1.55
Chilly and the other toys think that Rita, Donny's toy cheetah, is sick because of her spots, but Doc later discovers that she doesn't have an illness. Rita's spots are a part of her physical features.
40a	14a	"Big Head Hallie"	Dan Nosella	Kent Redeker	Massimiliano Lucania	January 31, 2014	214	1.53
Hallie discovers that she was based on a popular cartoon character and lets it go into her head.
40b	14b	"Peaches Pie, Take a Bath!"	Saul Blinkoff	Ed Valentine	Todd Bright and Massimiliano Lucania	January 31, 2014	214	1.53
Peaches Pie, a cute peach scented doll, refuses to take a bath, but doesn't realize that her peachy smell is gone thanks to Rudi playing with her in the rain.
41a	15a	"Celestial Celeste"	Saul Blinkoff	Kerri Grant	Akis Dimitrakopoulos	February 14, 2014	216	2.14
Celeste, Doc's space projector toy from school, is having trouble working by making a strange whirring noise after nearly getting knock off the shelf by Stuffy. So it's up to Doc and the crew to fix it.
41b	15b	"Run Doc Run!"	Dan Nosella	Story by : Chris Nee; Teleplay by : Justin Charlebois	David Frasquet	February 14, 2014	216	2.14
Doc sprains her ankle during a practice run for a fun run while trying to avoid a toy unicorn that was lying on the sidewalk. Doc has to rest, so the toys have to cure Doc, who has to cure Dart the Unicorn's broken leg before she does. This is the second instance of Doc being called Dottie.
42a	16a	"A Fairy Big Knot"	Saul Blinkoff	Chelsea Meyer	T.J. House	April 4, 2014	221	1.37
Frida Fairy's strings get knotted up during a very windy day and crashes, so it's up to Doc to de-tangle her strings.
42b	16b	"Rosie the Rescuer"	Dan Nosella	Story by : Chris Nee; Teleplay by : Sue Rose	Akis Dimitrakopoulos	April 4, 2014	221	1.37
Rosie the Rescuer, Emmie and Alma's toy EMT ambulance, panics while trying to save Sir Kirby. Later, Doc helps Rosie to calm down and not to panic by telling of her past experience helping Robot Ray.
43a	17a	"Crikey! It's Wildlife Will!"	Saul Blinkoff	Story by : Chris Nee; Teleplay by : Jennifer Hamburg	Andy Kelly	April 8, 2014	218	1.43
Wildlife Will, a toy explorer, loses his legs after a run in with a Chihuahua and it's up to Doc and the crew to build a special wheelchair for him.
43b	17b	"Rootin' Tootin' Southwest Sal"	Dan Nosella	Jennifer Hamburg	Rinat Gazizov	April 8, 2014	218	1.43
Southwest Sal, a toy cowgirl that is literally a cow, has a broken spring which controls her lasso throwing arm, and it's up to Doc to fix her.
44a	18a	"Take Your Doc to Work Day"	Saul Blinkoff	Story by : Ed Valentine; Teleplay by : Kerri Grant	Rinat Gazizov	April 24, 2014	225	1.48
On "Take Your Child To Work Day", Doc helps out at her mom's clinic by giving physicals to The Waiting Room toys and helps a doll named Curly-Q fix her hair by giving her a new hairstyle.
44b	18b	"Blazer's Bike"	Dan Nosella	Kent Redeker	Marten Jonmark	April 24, 2014	225	1.48
Star Blazer Zero has a problem riding his bike by crashing into everything and discovered that he had a helmet for a football player instead of his space helmet.
45a	19a	"The Big Storm"	Dan Nosella	Kent Redeker	Nondas Korodimos	May 16, 2014	222	1.60
A hurricane hits the neighborhood and Doc helps create an evacuation plan for the toys in the clinic including a "buddy system", but Chilly and Hallie accidentally get left behind when Chilly falls off the wagon during the evacuation and Hallie tries to help keep him calm.
45b	19b	"Spritzy Mitzi"	Saul Blinkoff	Story by : Ed Valentine; Teleplay by : Kerri Grant	David Frasquet	May 16, 2014	222	1.60
Spritzy Mitzi, an octopus-shaped sprinkler toy, ruptures a sprinkler tentacle after getting a pebble stuck in one of her sprinkling holes after ignoring Stuffy's advice on having Doc checking it out first.
46a	20a	"Dad's Favorite Toy"	Dan Nosella	Story by : Kent Redeker; Teleplay by : Sascha Paladino	Massimiliano Lucania	June 13, 2014	219	1.85
While cleaning out the attic, Doc's dad finds a beloved toy from his childhood called Saltwater Serge and Wellington Whale, who don't work because their button is worn out after being used a lot by Doc's dad when he was a kid.
46b	20b	"Chilly and the Dude"	Saul Blinkoff	Story by : Ed Valentine; Teleplay by : Ed Valentine and Chris Nee	Charles Grosvenor	June 13, 2014	219	1.85
Chilly meets up with a stuffed snowman known as "The Dude" when Doc goes to the clinic to make winter gift baskets for a school charity drive. Chilly is jealous when he feels that The Dude is more charming and athletic than him, but learns that it's okay to be yourself.
47a	21a	"Serpent Sam Makes a Splash"	Saul Blinkoff	Sue Rose	Lincoln Adams	July 11, 2014	217	2.26
Doc diagnoses Serpent Sam, a cool new snake-shaped super soaker water gun toy, who is suffering from "Sticky-itis" after he fills up with green apple soda instead of his usual water and gets clogged up from the sticky sugar residue.
47b	21b	"Sir Kirby and the Plucky Princess"	Dan Nosella	Story by : Ed Valentine; Teleplay by : Kerri Grant	Nondas Korodimos	July 11, 2014	217	2.14
To prove that princesses can do anything knights can do, Princess Persephone, or "Peri", as she likes to be called, challenges Sir Kirby to a playoff competition. Problems arise when Sir Kirby falls apart during the wall scaling competition after losing his balance and slamming himself against the castle wall.
48a	22a	"The Wicked King and the Mean Queen"	Dan Nosella	Kerri Grant	Dan Nosella	July 25, 2014	224	2.00
A snobbish new doll named Queen Amina arrives to the McStuffins household and start to lock horns with The Wicked King over who should throw the first royal ball. So Doc and the crew decided to have a treasure hunt for them to see who gets the most coins wins the rights to host the royal ball. But when Queen Amina injures herself during the competition, the Wicked King decided that friendship and sportsmanship were more important than winning.
48b	22b	"Take a Stroll!"	Saul Blinkoff	Chelsea Meyer	Hilare Van Der Broeke	July 25, 2014	224	2.00
After losing a relay race, Alma's baby doll, Tiny Tessie, discovers that she needs to get out of her Sleepy Slumber 2000 Stroller to be active and have more fun.
49a	23a	"Oooey Gablooey Springs a Leak"	Saul Blinkoff	Story by : Chris Nee; Teleplay by : Krista Tucker	Marten Jonmark	August 22, 2014	220	1.25
Oooey Gablooey, a toy sticky starfish which Donny won at the school fair, accidentally punctures himself after landing in a rose bush and started leaking blue ooze all over as he panics after seeing his goo leaking out as Doc tries to repair him.This episode is an allegory for Blood phobia
49b	23b	"There's a King in Your Tummy!"	Dan Nosella	Kent Redeker	Juan Carlos Moreno	August 22, 2014	220	1.25
While at the park, Serpent Sam accidentally swallows the Wicked King while filling up with water and Doc and the crew try to figure out a way to get the Wicked King out of Serpent Sam's tummy safely.
50a	24a	"Doc's Busy Day"	Norton Virgien	Ford Riley	Charlie Grosvenor	September 26, 2014	227	1.22
While under the advice of Hallie, Doc learns how to triage her patients after becoming overwhelmed with a busy day at the clinic when her and Donny's younger cousin, Sabrina, comes for a visit to the McStuffins household and causes chaos and a whole lot of boo-boos for the toys.
50b	24b	"Wrong Side of the Law"	Dan Nosella	Story by : Chris Nee; Teleplay by : Jen Hamburg	Massimiliano Lucania	September 26, 2014	227	1.22
Princess Doc and Princess Lambie are having a tea party when a police car interrupts them. Doc helps Officer Pete recognize that his eyesight is being hindered by a dirty and cracked windshield after wrecking while pursuing The Wicked King during a high-speed pursuit and needed a replacement windshield.
51a	25a	"Mirror, Mirror on My Penguin"	Saul Blinkoff	Kent Redeker	Jean Texier	October 3, 2014	223	1.20
Baby Suki's toy penguin, Waddly, is upset because she doesn't want to play with her and Doc discovers that the mirror on Waddly's tummy was dirty with baby guck.
51b	25b	"Hide and Eek!"	Dan Nosella	Story by : Ed Valentine; Teleplay by : Ford Riley	Andy Kelly	October 3, 2014	223	1.20
While playing Mad Scientist, Professor Donny and Professor Alma "create" a toy monster named Creepy Cuddly Charlie that scares all the other toys (except for Doc and Hallie). When they finally get to know Charlie, they realized that he is not that scary.
52a	26a	"McStuffins School of Medicine"	Brónagh O'Hanlon	Chelsea Meyer	Brian Wong	October 13, 2014	229	1.64
Dr Tundra, Emmie's new teddy bear, learns about the medical profession from Doc as an intern in her clinic and helps Stuffy after he crushed his snout in a book avalanche.
52b	26b	"The Super Amazing Ultra Hoppers"	Dan Nosella	Ford Riley	Vitaly Shafirov	October 13, 2014	229	1.64
Delloroto, one of the Super Amazing Ultra Hoppers, couldn't jump high like his brothers DiNardo and DiAmbrosio. So Doc (or "Dottoressa" as she was called) discovers that Delloroto was missing a few bricks, making him shorter than his brothers.
53	27	"Let the Nightingale Sing"	Norton Virgien	Chris Nee	Andy Kelly	November 2, 2014	232	2.68
Doc and the toys time travel back to 19th century England and they meet a young Florence Nightingale (Hallie's favorite idol) to help her accomplish her dream to be a nurse and assist her in repairing her toys.
54a	28a	"Hazel Has A Sleepover"	Brónagh O'Hanlon	Krista Tucker	Andy Kelly	November 7, 2014	226	1.38
Before Doc and Emmie have a sleepover water fight at the McStuffins household, Hazel, Emmie's new water toy, has a slight sleepwetting problem (leaky trunk) and Doc tries to solve her problem.
54b	28b	"My Breakfast With Bronty"	Dan Nosella	Kent Redeker	Nondas Korodimos	November 7, 2014	226	1.38
During breakfast, Bronty accidentally knocks over and stomps on a bottle of syrup which splashed onto his rear legs and caused them to be stuck onto his tail, but he was reluctant to tell Doc about his situation.
55a	29a	"Training Army Al"	Dan Nosella	Chris Nee	Juan Carlos Moreno	November 11, 2014	215	1.52
Doc tells her friends, including a worrisome Bronty, to feel their emotions when Army Al, an action figure, is separated from them after being called for duty, even if it is a trip to the forest with Donny and his Turtle Scouts troop. Doc and the toys support each other and help prepare Al to be his best because they are afraid that something bad might happen to him.
55b	29b	"Sproingo Boingo Takes the Leap"	Saul Blinkoff	Ed Valentine	Marten Jonmark	November 11, 2014	215	1.52
A fox-shaped Slinky toy named Sproingo Boingo accidentally twists his spring after doing a dangerous leap from a tall block tower for the Wicked King during a rainy day competition. So it was up to Doc to fix Sproingo Boingo, but the Wicked King felt guilty for causing his injury and daring him to do a dangerous leap, but Sproingo Boingo said that it was okay and accepted his apology.
56a	30a	"Shell Shy"	Brónagh O'Hanlon	Kerri Grant	David Frasquet	November 21, 2014	228	1.02
A wind-up toy sea turtle named Theodore is extremely shy after that discovering that Hermie, who was an old friend from the aquarium (and the most popular toy), was living at Doc's and is the grand Splash Dance champion. So Doc and the crew help Theodore overcome his shyness.
56b	30b	"Commander No"	Dan Nosella	Story by : Kerri Grant; Teleplay by : Ford Riley	Juan Carlos Moreno	November 21, 2014	228	1.02
During a game of Tickle Tag with Gloria the Giggling Gorilla, Commander Crush starts to malfunction and couldn't stop transforming. Doc discovers that Commander Crush had a stuck button that caused him to malfunction, but now, Commander Crush refuses to play the Tickle Game, fearing that he will malfunction again.
57a	31a	"The Flimsy Grumpy Bat"	Dan Nosella	Kent Redeker	Akis Dimitrakopoulos	December 5, 2014	230	1.12
The toys teach Count Clarence the Magnificent, a cardboard bat who thinks he could fly like a kite, about good positive attitudes after he becomes grouchy from getting caught in a gust of wind and crashing into the wading pool at the park.
57b	31b	"Rockstar Ruby and the Toys"	Brónagh O'Hanlon	Kerri Grant	Nondas Korodimos	December 5, 2014	230	1.12
Doc purchased a used Rock Star doll named Rockstar Ruby at a Yard Sale, but as dirt and gunk build up over time while being played with, they eventually cause Rockstar Ruby's microphone button to get stuck, forcing her to quit singing. But Doc and the crew have a plan to bring back Rockstar Ruby back on stage.
58a	32a	"A Day Without Cuddles!"	Brónagh O'Hanlon	Story by : Kent Redeker; Teleplay by : Jennifer Hamburg	Charlie Grosvenor	February 13, 2015	233	0.89
It's International Cuddle Day at the clinic, but Lambie suffered from a mysterious sneezing fit. Doc discovered that Lambie was covered with flour and ordered her to be quarantined and not to give any toys cuddles.
58b	32b	"Collide-o-scope"	Dan Nosella	Chelsea Meyer	David Frasquet	February 13, 2015	233	0.89
Kiara, Doc's new Kaleidoscope, suffered from a severe dizzy spell after Chilly accidentally fell, causing her to crash on the floor.
59a	33a	"Crash Course"	Dan Nosella	Kerri Grant	Dan Nosella	March 13, 2015	231	1.38
Doc helps a toy taxi cab driver named Tony learn the importance of paying attention to where you are going after he crashes while driving Sir Kirby and The Wicked King to Lambie's dance recital and loses his wheels in the process.
59b	33b	"Luna On the Moon-a"	Brónagh O'Hanlon	Kerri Grant	T.J. House	March 13, 2015	231	1.38
When Doc's new space doll, Luna 2200 (which she won first prize at the school's science fair), keeps slipping as she tries to climb her lunar mountain set, Doc discovers that the sticky grip on Luna's space boot is missing and replaces it for her after discovering the missing pad on Stuffy's back.
60a	34a	"Fully In Focus"	Damien O'Connor	Kacey Arnold	Vincent James and David Frasquet	March 13, 2015	235	1.39
Doc gives her view master toy, Viewy Stewie, an eye exam and discovers that two of his discs are accidentally jammed together causing him to see images incorrectly.
60b	34b	"Picky Nikki"	Dan Nosella	Chelsea Meyer	Tony Craig	March 13, 2015	235	1.39
Doc and the toys help Nikki Nickel, a piggy bank who only likes shiny coins, see that trying something new can be fun after Doc tries to put a dollar bill into the bank and Nikki refuses to accept it.
61a	35a	"Getting to the Heart of Things"	Dan Nosella	Ford Riley	Brian Wong	March 13, 2015	234	1.26
After Doc discovers that Coach Kay, a small plastic doll in a baseball cap, has a crack in her whistle valve, she takes her to the clinic to perform the surgery to replace the valve, but needed to confirm Kay that everything is going to be alright after she became afraid of the surgery procedures and prepping up.
61b	35b	"Toy in the Sun"	Brónagh O'Hanlon	Kent Redeker	Juan Carlos Moreno	March 13, 2015	234	1.26
Doc and the toys learn an important lesson about sun exposure after Donny accidentally leaves Bronty outside buried in the garden while playing "Dig the Dino" and his back was exposed to the sun, causing his plastic to become discolored.
62a	36a	"Fetchin' Findo"	Dan Nosella	Ford Riley	Nondas Korodimos	August 14, 2015	236	1.53
Donny has a new toy, Findo, a robotic puppy who wouldn't want to fetch his toy bone, so Doc decided to open a new Veterinarian branch to her clinic to take care of toy pets and discovered that Findo had sand in his electronic nose.
62b	36b	"Twin Tweaks"	Norton Virgien	Kerri Grant	Bob Smith	September 12, 2015	236	1.68
Jaz, one of the Twirly Twins, couldn't keep her balance with her brother Chaz due to the magnets on Jaz's, causing a mysterious force field that was separating them due to the magnets on Jaz's shoes were inserted backwards after an accident with Stuffy.
63a	37a	"Three Goats A'Cuddlin'"	Dan Nosella	Kent Redeker	Dan Nosella	August 14, 2015	237	1.42
When Farmer Mack's baby goats (kids), Wilma, Maria and Tallulah, started to act up and fall to the ground, Doc brought them in for a check-up and discovers that their coats were tangled and needed a brushing to keep their coats nice and clean.
63b	37b	"Swimmer's Belly"	Brónagh O'Hanlon	Story by : Kerri Grant; Teleplay by : Dani Michaeli	Mark Marren and Nondas Korodimos	August 14, 2015	237	1.42
Lambie creates a water ballet for Melinda the Mermaid, but when Melinda starts to suffer from dizzy spells during the water ballet rehearsals, Doc investigates and discovers that Melinda has water in her belly and needs to drain it out.

=== Season 3 (2015–16) ===
- Doc, Lambie, Stuffy, and Hallie were present in all episodes in this season.
- Chilly was absent from 1 episode: "Slip 'N Slide".

No. overall	No. in season	Title	Directed by	Written by	Storyboard by	Original release date	Prod. code	US viewers (millions)
64a	1a	"A Big Pain in Teddy's Tummy"	Damien O'Connor	Kent Redeker	T.J. House	July 11, 2015	303	1.40
While Donny is playing in the rose bushes with Lambie, Chilly, and Teddy B, he gets prickled by accident. While Doc investigates, Teddy B fears that he had hurt Donny, so he doesn't want to play with him again and runs away. Teddy B later realizes that he has a sharp pain in his tummy, the result of a rose thorn that was stuck in him that prickled both Donny and Doc.
64b	1b	"Slip 'N Slide"	Dan Nosella	Alison McDonald	Cliona Curran and Robin French	July 11, 2015	303	N/A
At the park's wading pool, Stuffy wishes he could go in the wading pool with the other pool toys. But while playing "Splash N' Dodge" with Bronty, Stuffy slips and falls into the wading pool, causing his plush to get all soggy. Absent: Chilly
65a	2a	"Itty Bitty Bess Takes Flight"	Dan Nosella	Kerri Grant	Juan Carlos Moreno	July 16, 2015	307	1.40
Itty Bitty Bess and her airplane Queenie, (an antique tintype airplane pilot which Doc's mom got from a flea market/swap meet who was based on "Queen" Bessie Coleman, a famous aviator who was the first African American woman to receive an international pilot license), have trouble flying due to rust. So Doc and the crew help Bess get back into the Wild Blue Yonder.
65b	2b	"Boxed In"	Brónagh O'Hanlon	Cate Lieuwen	Patricia Ross	July 16, 2015	307	1.52
Flora, a flamenco dancing doll that Doc received as a gift from her grandmother who was visiting Spain, is having a ball thrown in her honor by Doc and the crew, but for some unknown reason, she doesn't want to come out of the box. Doc soon discovers that Flora has a fear of getting messy that she must overcome.
66a	3a	"Top Lamb"	Jean Herlihy	Kerri Grant	Nondas Korodimos	July 30, 2015	306	1.57
Lambie plays with Doc's new pink kitchen play-set that Doc's dad gave her without permission and accidentally breaks it, injuring herself in the process. Note: This episode first aired on July 26, 2015, in Canada, but officially premiered in the USA on July 29, 2015.
66b	3b	"Molly Molly Mouthful"	Dan Nosella	Story by : Kent Redeker; Teleplay by : Jen Hamburg	Karin Gouyette	July 30, 2015	306	1.64
Doc's toy, Molly Molly Mouthful, loves to have flapjacks flipped into her mouth. When she comes to life and keeps talking while eating, one of her plastic flapjacks gets stuck in her mouth, so Doc and the crew teach Molly Molly how to eat carefully and not to talk with her mouth full. Note: This episode first aired on July 26, 2015, in Canada, but officially premiered in the USA on July 30, 2015.
67a	4a	"Filling Chilly"	Brónagh O'Hanlon	Shea Fontana	David Frasquet	August 6, 2015	309	1.30
While playing buccaneers with Doc and the crew, Chilly accidentally rips himself and loses half his stuffing, so Doc has to replace Chilly's stuffing with cotton balls.
67b	4b	"Doc's Dream Team"	Dan Nosella	Chelsea Beyl	Massimiliano Lucania	August 6, 2015	309	1.50
As Doc's dad reads a bedtime story about Prince Cameron and the giant five-eyed purple monster to her, Doc falls asleep and has a nightmare about the five-eyed purple monster chasing after her. Can the toys help Doc overcome her nightmare?
68	5	"A Dragon's Best Friend"	Norton Virgien	Chris Nee	Charles Grosvenor and Massimiliano Lucania	August 14, 2015	301	1.53
Doc and the crew are playing hide and seek at the park when Stuffy finds an odd little toy critter who Imprinting on Stuffy. So Doc and the crew decide to adopt the critter, now named Squibbles, as Stuffy's new toy pet.
69a	6a	"Take Your Pet to the Vet"	Richard Keane	Story by : Chris Nee; Teleplay by : Ford Riley	Tom Nesbitt	August 14, 2015	305	1.66
The toys prepare to welcome Coleslaw, Doc's class hamster from school, who loves to roll around in her hamster ball. When Coleslaw falls ill, Doc and her mom take Coleslaw to Dr. Reese's vet clinic and discover that Coleslaw has a slight cold and needs to rest.
69b	6b	"Master and Commander"	Dan Nosella	Sue Rose	Jessica Toth	August 14, 2015	305	1.66
Commander Crush and Star Blazer Zero are playing space commander, but Commander Crush injures himself while falling off his chair, and learns the importance of keeping all four legs of the chair on the ground.
70a	7a	"Stuffy & Squibbles"	Brónagh O'Hanlon	Chelsea Beyl	Andy Kelly	August 21, 2015	302	1.24
Stuffy learns that it's very important to take care of Squibbles, especially when Squibbles runs out of energy and needs to be recharged.
70b	7b	"Queen of Thrones"	Dan Nosella	Kerri Grant	Juan Carlos Moreno	August 21, 2015	302	1.24
As the toys are playing musical thrones, Stuffy accidentally knocks down The Wicked King and Queen Amina's castle. As they rebuild the castle, her bossiness causes a rift with the toys and they hurt Queen Amina's feelings by calling her 'bossy'. Doc teaches the toys that name-calling is not a nice thing to do and Queen Amina isn't bossy, but is doing her job as a leader.
71a	8a	"Huggable Hallie"	Damien O'Connor	Kent Redeker	Marco Piersma	August 28, 2015	308	1.33
During a check-up, Hallie's foot mysteriously starts to talk, making the other toys think that Hallie's foot is possessed. However, it is discovered that the voice chip that makes Hallie talk went down to her foot and needs surgery to remove it.
71b	8b	"Pop-Up Paulo"	Dan Nosella	Jennifer Hamburg	T.J. House	August 28, 2015	308	1.33
Pop-Up Paulo, a pop-up toy frog that Donny received in a goodie bag, injures himself, but Doc and the others think that Pop-Up Paulo is faking it and don't realize that he is really injured.
72a	9a	"Nurse's Office"	Dan Nosella	Chelsea Beyl	Jessica Toth	September 18, 2015	310	0.97
As Doc and the toys are playing school, Chilly decides to pretend to be sick so he can visit the nurse's office, but discovers that he can't fake an illness just to visit the nurse's office.
72b	9b	"A Case of the Glitters"	Brónagh O'Hanlon	Story by : Kerri Grant; Teleplay by : Jennifer Hamburg	Juan Carlos Moreno	September 18, 2015	310	0.97
As Doc and the toys were playing explorers, the toys came down with a mysterious outbreak that is making the toys itchy. It was discovered that the toys had an outbreak of the glitters due to taking turns wearing Dress Up Daisy's explorer hat after glitter was spilled on her, similar to head lice. Doc teaches the toys that it's important not to share anything with anyone else, such as a hat or a hairbrush. Later even after shaking off the glitter, they are afraid to play with Dress Up Daisy and hurt her feelings in the process.
73a	10a	"Doc McStuffins Goes to Washington"	Norton Virgien	Chris Nee	Nondas Korodimos	October 5, 2015	311	1.24
Doc and her toys receive an invite to the White House in Washington DC to meet with First Lady Michelle Obama, but as they prepare for a tour of the White House, Lisa (one of the other children invited)'s toy otter, Tavia, falls ill and goes "MIA" at the White House, so it's up to Doc and the toys to find her. Guest star: Michelle Obama as herself. This is the first time that a First Lady of the United States became a voice actor in an American animated children's television series.
73b	10b	"Winded Winnie"	Brónagh O'Hanlon	Chelsea Beyl	Massimiliano Lucania	October 5, 2015	311	1.24
It's Donny's birthday, but Winnie, a toy tiger cub that is used to blow up balloons, isn't working properly. Doc discovers that Winnie has dust in her lungs due to being up in the attic for a long time and needs to clear out her lungs to blow up balloons properly.
74a	11a	"Hallie Halloween"	Dan Nosella	Kerri Grant	Dan Nosella	October 9, 2015	304	1.54
As Doc and the toys go trick-or-treating in the neighborhood, Hallie gets separated from the group while following a fellow trick-or-treater wearing a Hallie Hippo costume and is spooked by the scarier Halloween costume that the trick-or-treaters wear, and learns that it's safer being in a group that being separated.
74b	11b	"Don't Fence Me In"	Brónagh O'Hanlon	Kent Redeker	Massimiliano Lucania	October 9, 2015	304	1.54
Gustave the Gulpy Gulpy Gator gets himself stuck in a fence gate while chasing a runaway marble, and Doc and the other toys try to set Gustave free without injuring him in the process.
75a	12a	"Demitri the Dazzling!"	Dan Nosella	Story by : Chris Nee; Teleplay by : Ford Riley	Bob Smith	November 2, 2015	314	1.21
Donny's magician partner, Dmitri's toy bunny-rabbit, Carrots, gets a loose spring in its paw and accidentally wrecks Dmitri's magic stage in the process.
75b	12b	"Smitten With a Kitten"	Brónagh O'Hanlon	Story by : Kerri Grant; Teleplay by : Shea Fontana	Marco Piersma	November 2, 2015	314	1.21
Doc receives a toy kitten as a gift at a second-hand-toy fund-raiser at her school, who Lambie decides to adopt and name Whispers. At first, the kitten feels intimidated, but gets used to its surroundings and its new owner, Lambie.
76a	13a	"The Search for Squibbles"	Dan Nosella	Chelsea Beyl	Nondas Korodimos	November 2, 2015	315	1.20
As Stuffy, Dress Up Daisy and her pet poodle Piper were training Squibbles, who goes AWOL, it's up to Doc and the other toys to find the missing Squibbles.
76b	13b	"Factory Fabulous"	Brónagh O'Hanlon	Shea Fontana	Massimiliano Lucania	November 2, 2015	315	1.20
The Logger of Lemurs troupe (Wyatt, Trixie, Butch, Calamity, Otis, Tumbleweed, Boots, Maybelle, Cheyenne, and Yul) show off their amazing skills to Oooey Gablooey. The yellow male lemur, Wyatt, discovers that he is missing an arm and decides to quit the team. Doc researches that Wyatt was intentionally built this way at the factory. She tells him he is perfect the way he is that being born with one arm is great because it is unduplicatable, and makes him one of a kind.
77a	14a	"Lambie Gets the Linties"	Dan Nosella	Cate Lieuwen	Karin Gouyette	November 6, 2015	312	1.07
As Professor Hootsburgh plans to paint a portrait of the "plushies", Lambie falls into a mud puddle while doing a pirouette and gets muddy, so she cannot participate in the portrait. Meanwhile, the Wicked King tries to Photobomb the portrait. As Lambie returns, she discovers that she has lint all over her body and needs surgery to remove the lint from her plush.
77b	14b	"Moo-Moo's Tutu Boo-Boo"	Brónagh O'Hanlon	Story by : Kent Redeker; Teleplay by : Alison McDonald	David Frasquet	November 6, 2015	312	1.07
Moo Moo always dreamed to be a ballet dancer like Bella and Lambie, but she accidentally ripped her leg during rehearsal after tripping.
78a	15a	"The New Nurse"	Brónagh O'Hanlon	Chelsea Beyl	T.J. House	November 13, 2015	316	0.90
Dress-Up Declan, Emmie's fashion doll, visits Doc's home and as they are playing basketball, Hallie injures herself crashing into a rose bush. Luckily, Declan has a Nurse's outfit to assist Doc, but Daisy displays some chauvinism about Declan being a nurse. When Daisy injures herself while playing cowboy, she realizes that guys like Declan can be nurses too.
78b	15b	"Chilly's Loose Button"	Dan Nosella	Kerri Grant	Jessica Toth	November 13, 2015	316	0.90
While preparing for a snow day, Chilly accidentally crashes into Lambie, causing the button on his tummy to become loose, but is afraid to tell Doc.
79a	16a	"Say It Again, Sadie"	Damien O'Connor	Kerri Grant	David Frasquet	November 20, 2015	317	0.85
Emmie's new toy parrot, Sadie, refuses to talk, so Doc takes Sadie in for a check-up and discovers that there is a switch on Sadie's back that causes her beak to glow red and makes her speak.
79b	16b	"Mind Over Matter"	Dan Nosella	Story by : Chris Nee; Teleplay by : Shea Fontana	Juan Carlos Moreno	November 20, 2015	317	0.85
Saltwater Serge felt out of place being a sea explorer in the middle of a space adventure with Commander Crush and his space crew and felt envious of the flashy toys. Donny took the Command Center to his play date, and Saltwater Serge showed the others how they could still play Space Explorers without all the fancy gadgetry.
80a	17a	"Snowy Gablooey"	Richard Keane	Kent Redeker	Ed Baker	December 4, 2015	313	0.78
During a snowball fight with Doc, Donny accidentally got snow in his coat, and as he went inside, he accidentally left Oooey Gablooey in a snowdrift, causing him to freeze up.
80b	17b	"Goooooal!"	Dan Nosella	Ed Valentine	Charles Grosvenor	December 4, 2015	313	0.78
As Doc and the toys were playing ice hockey, Sir Kirby, who was the star goalie for Hallie's team, accidentally dislocated his shoulder colliding with Tremaine on the ice, but was afraid to tell Doc about it and had to sit out of the match, being replaced by Leilani as goalie.
81a	18a	"Space Buddies Forever!"	Brónagh O'Hanlon	Kent Redeker	Massimiliano Lucania	December 11, 2015	320	0.97
As Doc and the toys are playing Space Exploration, the Wicked King gets abducted by a crow. As Commander Crush rescues the Wicked King, he dislocates his wing, so he can't transform into a space plane until his wing is repaired. Luckily, Star Blazer Zero donated two of his screws to repair Commander Crush's wing.
81b	18b	"Liv Long and Pawsper"	Dan Nosella	Story by : Kerri Grant; Teleplay by : Ed Valentine	John Flagg	December 11, 2015	320	0.97
Luna's robotic dog, Space Rover Olivia 0-197-0, a.k.a. Liv, broke her antenna, but felt uncomfortable as her antenna was replaced, and needed a cone collar to prevent her from scratching her antenna.
82a	19a	"Kirby's Derby"	Shane Collins	Kerri Grant	Nondas Korodimos	January 2, 2016	322	1.50
Sir Kirby dreams of winning the McStuffins Derby Cup and Rose Crown against the Wicked King, Queen Amina, and Dress-Up Daisy, but a mishap on Sir Kirby's steed Bonnie Blue (who cracked and lost a wheel on the process) nearly injures her and caused Sir Kirby to feel guilty about her injury.
82b	19b	"Ticklish Truck"	Dan Nosella	Kent Redeker	Charles Grosvenor	January 2, 2016	322	1.50
While playing "Defend the Pillow Fort from the Dragons", a pillow rips, spewing feathers all over the room, but one of the feathers gets imbedded inside Lenny, causing him to laugh and uncontrollably squirt water.
83a	20a	"Blast Off to the Unknown!"	Dan Nosella	Chris Nee	David Frasquet	January 9, 2016	321	1.57
Donny's friend, Carlos, is moving away and his space toy, Star Blazer Zero, is going with him, but he is sad about leaving the neighborhood and his best friend, Commander Crush, and is afraid of going to an unknown place. But Doc assures him that it's okay to be sad and not to be nervous about discovering new places.
83b	20b	"Bust a Move"	Brónagh O'Hanlon	Kerri Grant	Marco Piersma	January 9, 2016	321	1.57
A new neighbor named Dawn moves into Carlos' old home in the neighborhood and brings her stuffed toy dancing pig, Ferris, along, but he is banged up and dirty from the move. As Doc gives him a check-up, Commander Crush wonders if Ferris could become friends with him. Luckily, both Ferris and Commander Crush have one thing in common -they love to dance- and became good friends.
84a	21a	"Baby McStuffins"	Brónagh O'Hanlon	Chelsea Beyl	David Frasquet	March 4, 2016	325	1.43
Doc's parents announce that she and Donny will be getting a younger sibling as they will be adopting a baby in a couple of months. In the meantime, she gives Doc a baby doll to practice taking care of to prove she is ready to babysit. After a slew of nicknames, Doc accepts Chilly's suggestion of "Cutie Cute", but abbreviates it, naming her "Cece".
84b	21b	"Selfless Snowman"	Dan Nosella	Story by : Chelsea Beyl; Teleplay by : Cate Lieuwen	Kinjo Estioko	March 4, 2016	325	1.43
Doc holds a stuffing donation drive after Hallie realizes that their stockpile is running low. Chilly doesn't want to donate since he is afraid of the pain. He changes his mind after Pickles the bunny receives a rip in her plush. She needs a rare kind of stuffing which only he can provide, so he offers up his inner whiteness to fill her void.This episode is about blood donation
85a	22a	"St. Patrick's Day Dilemma"	Richard Keane	Chelsea Beyl	Bob Smith	March 9, 2016	318	1.27
Doc brings home a new paper doll named Fiona for St. Patrick's Day, and when Donny draws on her, her dress doesn't look good.
85b	22b	"A Giant Save"	Brónagh O'Hanlon	Kerri Grant	Juan Carlos Moreno and Kinjo Estioko	March 9, 2016	318	1.27
Doc's mom gives her a giant named Gillian (from the book), but she doesn't know how to have a tea party and build a castle. In the meanwhile, Professor Hootsburgh gets stuck in a tree (and rips herself in the process) and Gillian saves her.
86a	23a	"Runaway Love"	Damien O'Connor	Chris Nee	Juan Carlos Moreno	March 11, 2016	326	1.12
When Donny, who feels like the new baby is going to replace him, runs away, it's up to Doc and her parents to find him and reassure to him that they have enough love for all of them.
86b	23b	"Tour De McStuffins"	Dan Nosella	Story by : Kerri Grant; Teleplay by : Corey Powell	Nondas Korodimos	March 11, 2016	326	1.12
When Doc wins a toy bike with a racer named Stella, the racer goes too fast and crashes into a block castle, bending her leg in the process.
87a	24a	"Hooty's Duty"	Jean Herlihy	Kent Redeker	Akis Dimitrakopoulos	March 18, 2016	327	N/A
Nurse Hattie throws Doc's mom a baby shower.
87b	24b	"A Cure for a King"	Dan Nosella	Chelsea Beyl	Cliona Curran	March 18, 2016	327	N/A
When the Wicked King steals Queen Amina's crown, he loses his own crown in the process.
88	25	"Bringing Home Baby"	Norton Virgien	Chris Nee	John Flagg and Marco Piersma	March 25, 2016	328	N/A
Doc's mom gets the call - Baby McStuffins is here. They rush to meet and retrieve the baby while Grandma McStuffins comes to take care of Donny and Doc.
89a	26a	"Baby Names"	Dan Nosella	Kent Redeker	David Frasquet	April 1, 2016	329	N/A
The McStuffins family chooses a name for the new baby: Maya. Also, Lala, the new baby toy, ripped her plush while trying to make Maya stop her crying and Doc fixes her in the process.
89b	26b	"Night Night, Lala"	Shane Collins	Story by : Chelsea Beyl; Teleplay by : Ed Valentine	Massimiliano Lucania	April 1, 2016	329	N/A
Lala has a hard time adjusting to her new home.
90a	27a	"The Lady in the Lake"	Richard Keane	Carin Greenberg Baker	John Flagg	April 4, 2016	323	N/A
When Dress-Up Daisy doesn't want to wear her life vest on the boat, she falls in the water and gets soaked.
90b	27b	"Black Belt Kangaroos"	Dan Nosella	Kent Redeker	Akis Dimitrakopoulos	April 4, 2016	323	N/A
Sydney the kangaroo has a hard time concentrating on his karate lesson and injures himself in the process.
91a	28a	"Joni the Pony"	Jean Herlihy	Kerri Grant	Massimiliano Lucania	April 18, 2016	324	N/A
Joni the pony trips over her mane and the other toys suggest a haircut.
91b	28b	"Sleepless in Stuffyland"	Dan Nosella	Shea Fontana	Jessica Toth	April 18, 2016	324	N/A
Stuffy can't sleep the night before Doc's presentation at school.
92a	29a	"The Scrapiest Dragon"	Jean Herlihy	Kent Redeker	Nondas Korodimos	April 25, 2016	319	N/A
Stuffy scrapes his belly during a ping pong match with Hallie.
92b	29b	"Going for Broke"	Dan Nosella	Shea Fontana	Olsen Groiseau	April 25, 2016	319	N/A
Awesome Guy tries to compete in every event of the McStuffins Toyathalon.

=== Season 4: Toy Hospital (2016–18) ===
- Doc, Lambie, Stuffy, Chilly, and Hallie were present in all episodes in this season.

Note: This is the last season to feature two 11-minute stories.

No. overall	No. in season	Title	Directed by	Written by	Storyboard by	Original release date	Prod. code	US viewers (millions)
93	1	"Welcome to McStuffinsville"	Dan Nosella and Brónagh O'Hanlon	Chris Nee	David Frasquet, Nondas Korodimos and Marco Piersma	July 29, 2016	401	1.07
94	2	"Welcome to McStuffinsville"	Dan Nosella and Brónagh O'Hanlon	Chris Nee	David Frasquet, Nondas Korodimos and Marco Piersma	July 29, 2016	402	1.07
Grandma McStuffins reveals her magical stethoscope and teleports her and Doc to McStuffinsville, putting her in charge of the McStuffinsville Hospital. Guest star: Anthony Anderson as Stanley, the hybrid plush of half-lion, half-bunny.
95a	3a	"First Day of Med School"	Damien O'Connor	Kerri Grant	Robert Souza	August 5, 2016	403	0.88
Doc's toys become her med students.
95b	3b	"Stuffy Gets His Scrubs"	Dan Nosella	Kent Redeker	Juan Carlos Moreno	August 5, 2016	403	0.88
Stuffy tries to find his place at McStuffinsville.
96a	4a	"Night Shift"	Damien O'Connor	Chelsea Beyl	David Schwartz	August 12, 2016	404	0.81
On their first night shift, Lambie is in charge of the Hospital Nursery, but cannot get the babies to sleep.
96b	4b	"Check-up Chilly"	Dan Nosella	Chelsea Beyl	John Flagg	August 12, 2016	404	0.81
Chilly schedules too many appointments for himself.
97a	5a	"Project Nursery Makeover"	Brónagh O'Hanlon	Kerri Grant	Jessica Toth	August 19, 2016	405	1.05
Doc and the toys receive 4 identical toy babies as Lambie has a problem telling the babies apart.
97b	5b	"Stuffy's Ambulance Ride"	Richard Keane	Kent Redeker	Mick Harrison	August 19, 2016	405	1.05
As Stuffy hurts himself playing a jousting match, he fears his first ambulance ride to the hospital.
98a	6a	"Made to Be a Nurse"	Damien O'Connor	Chelsea Beyl	Nondas Korodimos	August 26, 2016	406	0.91
A new nurse upstages Hallie and she no longer feels needed.
98b	6b	"Rescue at the Ranch"	Dan Nosella	Jennifer Hamburg	Robin French	August 26, 2016	406	0.91
Doc responds to an emergency call during an accident at Southwest Sal's Ranch. It teaches you the importance of staying calm and following directions.
99a	7a	"Cece's First Bath"	Jean Herlihy	Kerri Grant	David Frasquet	September 16, 2016	407	0.73
Baby toy, Cece, gets her first bath after falling in the mud as Maya begins crying knowing that she wants Cece.
99b	7b	"The Most Impatient Patient"	Dan Nosella	Ed Valentine	Cliona Curran	September 16, 2016	407	0.73
The Wicked King gets a crown-cushion and he ends up being a pain to everyone at the hospital.
100a	8a	"Chilly's Snow Globe Shakeup"	Damien O'Connor	Kent Redeker	Lincoln Adams	September 23, 2016	408	0.66
Chilly wants to move a giant snow globe and asks Awesome Guy for help to move it for a group of toy snowmen that live in it.
100b	8b	"Hoarse Hallie"	Jean Herlihy	Jennifer Hamburg	Juan Carlos Moreno	September 23, 2016	408	0.64
After practicing her singing for a sports event, Hallie ends up losing her voice as the Wicked King tries to sabotage her.
101a	9a	"A Lesson in Diagnosis"	Dan Nosella	Kent Redeker	John Flagg	September 30, 2016	409	0.84
Lambie, Stuffy and Chilly try to find a problem they can solve without Doc's help.
101b	9b	"Karaoke Katie's Opening Night"	Brónagh O'Hanlon	Jeffrey King	David Frasquet	September 30, 2016	409	0.84
A singing toy named Katie cannot perform as she is attached to a mobile battery while she is re-charging.
102a	10a	"Nikki's Night in the E.R."	Dan Nosella	Chelsea Beyl	Nondas Korodimos	October 7, 2016	410	1.22
Nikki the piggy bank gets cracked and feels scared about spending the night in the hospital.
102b	10b	"Royal Buddies"	Damien O'Connor	Kerri Grant	Jessica Toth	October 7, 2016	410	1.22
The Wicked King and Sir Kirby must work together to find Sir Kirby's stolen family heirloom.
103a	11a	"Bouncy House Boo-Boos"	Dan Nosella	Chelsea Beyl	Akis Dimitrakopoulos	November 5, 2016	411	0.91
It's Boppy the Bouncy toy's birthday as everyone gets hurt inside Boppy's bouncy house home.
103b	11b	"The Best Therapy Pet Yet"	Damien O'Connor	Ed Valentine	Leah Waldron	November 5, 2016	411	0.91
Stuffy brings Squibbles to the toy hospital as he remembers that pets aren't allowed inside.
104a	12a	"The Mayor's Speech"	Dan Nosella	Chelsea Beyl	Robin French	November 12, 2016	412	1.26
Doc and the toys try to help a duck-billed platypus' stuttering problem as he gets nervous for a speech to become the Mayor.
104b	12b	"The Lake Monster"	Damien O'Connor	Jennifer Hamburg	David Frasquet	November 12, 2016	412	1.26
Hermie the crab warns Doc and her toys of a mysterious so-called "lake monster" being spotted in Bathtub Lake.
105a	13a	"Chuck Learns to Look!"	Damien O'Connor	Jeffrey King	Massimiliano Lucania	November 19, 2016	413	1.06
A toy chicken named Chuck from out of town unwillingly causes accidents by not looking while crossing the street.
105b	13b	"Birthday Party Emergency"	Richard Keane	Kent Redeker	Juan Carlos Moreno	November 19, 2016	413	1.06
Doc and the toys find a toy robot spider with his 8 robotic spider legs missing as they try to find them before a birthday party.
106a	14a	"Camille Gets Over the Hump"	Dan Nosella	Kerri Grant	Nondas Korodimos	January 14, 2017	416	N/A
A toy camel named Camille plans to see a meteor shower as she feels something sharp inside her hump.
106b	14b	"Willow's Wonky Whiskers"	Jean Herlihy and Rob Byrne	Chelsea Beyl	TBA	January 14, 2017	416	N/A
A toy cat named Willow feels scared about having a C.A.T. scan as she felt something funny in her face.
107	15	"Into the Hundred Acre Wood!"	Brónagh O'Hanlon	Chris Nee	Massimiliano Lucania	January 18, 2017	415	N/A
Doc and her toys meet Winnie the Pooh and his friends. This episode marks the final time Peter Cullen voiced Eeyore prior to his death on August 26, 2026. Guest star: Jim Cummings as Pooh and Tigger, Travis Oates as Piglet, Peter Cullen as Eeyore, and Oliver Bell as Christopher Robin. This episode serves as a crossover featuring characters from the Winnie the Pooh franchise.
108a	16a	"Mole Money, Mole Problems"	Dan Nosella	Shea Fontana	Jessica Toth	February 4, 2017	417	0.74
A mole with bad eyesight has problems seeing where she is going as Stuffy trains pets to help her.
108b	16b	"Yip, Yip, Boom!"	Damien O'Connor	Alison McDonald	Akis Dimitrakopoulos	February 4, 2017	417	N/A
Celeste's special space show is scaring Squibbles, causing him to run away from the loud sounds.
109a	17a	"Get-Well Gus Gets Well"	Dan Nosella	Kerri Grant	Tobias Schwarz	April 7, 2017	414	0.68
When a flying Pegasus toy, Get-Well Gus, crashes and breaks off one of his wings, Doc outfits him with a prosthetic.
109b	17b	"Triceratops Trouble"	Damien O'Connor	Jennifer Hamburg	Marco Piersma	April 7, 2017	414	N/A
Doc and the toys have trouble diagnosing a triceratops train named Tracy that can't get enough traction to move.
110a	18a	"Hannah the Brave"	Damien O'Connor	Kerri Grant	Kinjo Estioko	June 4, 2017	425	1.18
When Hannah the doll gets gum stuck in her hair, she needs Doc's help. Hannah belongs to Audrey, a little girl receiving treatment for cancer. Guest star: Robin Roberts as Audrey's mother.
110b	18b	"Waddly's Huggy Overload"	Damien O'Connor	Rachel Vine	Jessica Toth and Akis Dimitrakopoulos	June 4, 2017	425	1.18
Doc is selected to lead the rescue workers parade.
111a	19a	"Lambie Stuffy Switcheroo"	Damien O'Connor	Kerri Grant	Marco Piersma	June 17, 2017	418	1.08
When Stuffy claims that Lambie's job taking care of the babies in the Toy Nursery is easy, Lambie challenges him to switch jobs with her for the day.
111b	19b	"The Sleepwalking King"	Dan Nosella	Jeffrey King	Cliona Curran	June 17, 2017	418	1.08
During a sleepover at the royal castle, Doc discovers that the Wicked King has been sleepwalking.
112a	20a	"Count Clarence's Daytime Adventure"	Dan Nosella	Kerri Grant	Tobias Schwarz	July 1, 2017	422	0.84
Count Clarence stays up all day wanting to see his favorite play.
112b	20b	"Dixie Gets Glued"	Alan Moran	Kent Redeker	Massimiliano Lucania	July 1, 2017	422	0.84
After playing with Maya, Dixie tries to make a mobile, but gets lots of paste all around her.
113	21	"Lambie and the McStuffins Babies"	Norton Virgien	Chelsea Beyl	David Frasquet and Juan Carlos Moreno	July 15, 2017	423	0.87
At Baby Doll headquarters, Lambie, Stuffy, Chilly and Hallie turn into baby toys and get transported to a family house.
114a	22a	"The Emergency Plan"	Dan Nosella	Chris Nee	Tobias Schwarz	August 5, 2017	426	0.82
Dragon-Bot becomes a giant and his stomping causes a family home to fall apart with a doll family feeling unprepared.
114b	22b	"What a Quack"	Seamus O'Toole	Kerri Grant	Massimiliano Lucania	August 5, 2017	426	0.82
A toy duck named Quackson tries to fix toys her own way and has a fear of doctors and nurses.
115	23	"First Responders to the Rescue"	Dan Nosella	Kent Redeker	Massimiliano Lucania and Nondas Korodimos	September 23, 2017	427	0.88
116	24	"First Responders to the Rescue"	Dan Nosella	Kent Redeker	Massimiliano Lucania and Nondas Korodimos	September 23, 2017	428	0.88
After a sudden storm hits McStuffinsville, a young boy named Dev finds himself transported to the town along with his toys who come together to form the First Responders team. Note: This episode was supposed to air on September 9, 2017, but was delayed in the wake of Hurricane Irma.
117a	25a	"Mermaid in the Midfield"	Richard Keane & Darren Robbie	Jennifer Hamburg	Jessica Toth	October 21, 2017	421	0.93
Doc teaches the toys about toy sports medicine during a foosball championship game.
117b	25b	"Whole Lotta Hula"	Damien O'Connor	Jeffrey King	Akis Dimitrakopoulos	October 21, 2017	421	0.93
When Leilani has been hulaing in the sun for too long, she decides not to go to the sun again.
118a	26a	"Daisy Makes the Call"	Dan Nosella	Chelsea Beyl	Dan Nosella	November 4, 2017	420	0.76
Dress Up Daisy makes too many emergency calls.
118b	26b	"Visiting Hours"	Damien O'Connor	Kent Redeker	Nondas Korodimos	November 4, 2017	420	0.76
When Commander Crush gets into a bike crash, Star Blazer Zero comes to visit him while he is recovering at the Toy Hospital.
119a	27a	"Stuffy's Wild Pet"	Richard Keane and Damien O'Connor	Jennifer Hamburg	David Frasquet	January 12, 2018	419	0.62
While on Safari, Stuffy decides to adopt a toy zebra.
119b	27b	"On Call Ball"	Dan Nosella	Shea Fontana	Juan Carlos Moreno	January 12, 2018	419	0.62
Lambie gets an invitation to the Wicked King's "Ball-a-Thon", an all-night dance competition.
120a	28a	"On a Roll!"	Damien O'Connor	Jennifer Hamburg	TBA	March 2, 2018	424	0.51
Wildlife Will has problems traveling in McStuffinsville due to his wheelchair from gates, stairs, and high areas.
120b	28b	"Home Is Where the Fruit Is"	Dan Nosella	Jeffrey King	Nondas Korodimos	March 2, 2018	424	0.51
A lost toy porcupine named Rocky wanders off too far from home as Doc, Officer Pete, and the toys search for Rocky's home. Note: This is the final episode of the show to be 11 minutes long, as the remainder of the show's episodes are 22 minutes.

=== Season 5: Pet Rescue / Baby / Ultimate Safari / Arctic Rescue / Toy Hospital (2018–20) ===
- Doc, Lambie, Stuffy, Chilly, and Hallie were present in all episodes in this season.

No. overall	No. in season	Title	Directed by	Written by	Storyboard by	Original release date	Prod. code	US viewers (millions)
121	1	"The Pet Rescue Team"	John Musumeci	Story by : Kerri Grant and Randi Barnes; Teleplay by : Kerri Grant	Nondas Korodimos	October 26, 2018	502	0.43
Doc puts together the Pet Rescue Team.
122	2	"A Pet For Everyone"	John Musumeci	Randi Barnes	Nondas Korodimos	November 23, 2018	TBA	0.59
After a dog gets stranded in McStuffinsville, Doc and the Pet Rescue Team find the dog and then host a Pet Adoption Fair.
123	3	"The Doc McStuffins Christmas Special"	Norton Virgien	Chris Nee	Charles Grosvenor and Massimiliano Lucania	December 2, 2018	501	0.67
When Santa Claus goes missing, it's up to Doc and the Pet Rescue Team to save Christmas.
124	4	"Toys in Space"	Dan Nosella	Michael Stern	Massimiliano Lucania	January 4, 2019	TBA	0.49
When Chilly gets stranded in space, Doc and the toys go on a rescue mission to save him.
125	5	"Adventures in Baby Land"	John Musumeci	Jeffrey King	Charles Grovenor and Juan Carlos Moreno	March 1, 2019	505	0.56
When Cece accidentally gets hold of Lambie's Toysponder and transports herself to McStuffinsville, Doc and the crew must embark on a rollicking adventure to find her.
126	6	"Stuffy's Safari"	John Musumeci	Randi Barnes	Massimiliano Lucania and Toby Schwarz	June 22, 2019	507	0.50
Stuffy ventures deep into the jungle in search of Dragon Mountain, a legendary place where he hopes to find a dragon family of his own.
127	7	"Jungle Jumble"	Dan Nosella	Eva Konstantopoulos	Massimiliano Lucania and Darren Taylor	November 3, 2019	508	0.45
After offering to watch over the Nursery, Chilly is too afraid to ask questions and gets in way over his head.
128	8	"Arctic Exposure"	Dan Nosella	Kerri Grant	Darren Taylor and Massimiliano Lucania	November 30, 2019	514	0.27
To save Scarlet's dad, Doc and the crew must venture where no McStuffins toy has gone before: to the Toyarctic!
129	9	"Jumbo Mumbo"	John Musumeci	Eva Konstantopoulos	Toby Schwarz and Angeliki Salamaliki	January 4, 2020	515	0.36
Chilly forms a special bond with Mumbo, a rambunctious baby mammoth; when Mumbo is ready to be delivered to the Toyarctic, Chilly must find a way for them to remain friends.
130	10	"The Hallie Trap"	John Musumeci	Kerri Grant	Paul Riley and Ceili Braidwood	January 25, 2020	509	0.39
When Hallie switches places with her look-alike, the famous Hallie the Entertainer, she learns firsthand what it's like to be a star and what happens when one pretends to be someone else.
131	11	"Lost and Found"	John Musumeci	Story by : Kerri Grant and Chelsea Beyl; Teleplay by : Chelsea Beyl	Darren Taylor and Ceili Braidwood	February 8, 2020	516	0.37
When Lambie is mistakenly transported to Lost and Found Land, it's up to Doc and the crew to save Lambie and find homes for all the misplaced toys stranded in this forgotten world.
132	12	"Bedazzled!"	Dan Nosella	Story by : Randi Barnes; Teleplay by : Chris Nee and Randi Barnes	Massimiliano Lucania, Ceili Braidwood, and Angeliki Salamaliki	February 22, 2020	TBA	0.48
133	13	"Bedazzled!"	Dan Nosella	Story by : Randi Barnes; Teleplay by : Chris Nee and Randi Barnes	Massimiliano Lucania, Ceili Braidwood, and Angeliki Salamaliki	February 22, 2020	TBA	0.48
Doc and the crew venture deep into the jungle to find a bedazzling jewel that will help the Duchess of Dazzle regain her strength.
134	14	"The Great McStuffins Meltdown"	Dan Nosella	Jeffrey King	Massimiliano Lucania, Ceili Braidwood, and Charles Grosvenor	March 7, 2020	TBA	0.43
135	15	"The Great McStuffins Meltdown"	Dan Nosella	Jeffrey King	Massimiliano Lucania, Ceili Braidwood, and Charles Grosvenor	March 7, 2020	TBA	0.43
When Doc approves an upgrade to the hospital, she has no idea that the electricity the new machines use will melt the snow in the Toyarctic and endanger her Arctic friends.
136	16	"It's a Hard Doc Life"	Dan Nosella	Kerri Grant	Ceili Braidwood	April 18, 2020	506	0.53
After making a big mistake at the McStuffinsville Toy Hospital, Doc begins to wonder if her patients would have been better off if she hadn't been there at all. Note: This Episode is the Series finale

=== Special (2022) ===
Title	Directed by	Written by	Original release date
"The Doc is 10!"	Alicia Minter	Tom Rogers	August 26, 2022

== The Doc Files (2013–14) ==
The Doc Files is a spin-off series to Doc McStuffins. Doc takes an in-depth look at specific cases and diagnoses after the clinic doors close for the day. The series debuted in the US on Disney Junior and Disney Channel on July 22, 2013.

Each episode opens with Doc pulling a toy patient's chart and recalling how she solved the case. The flashback sequences are done in 2D animation, while the beginning and end are done in the same CGI as the main Doc McStuffins episodes.

No.	Title	Original release date
1	"Blurry Night"	April 15, 2014
Patient: Aurora
2	"Run Down Rotors"	September 27, 2013
Patient: Rescue Ronda
3	"Sticky Slippies"	September 13, 2013
Patient: Stuffy
4	"The Lamb's Exam"	September 6, 2013
Patient: Lambie
5	"Bella's Bath"	July 22, 2013
Patient: Bella
6	"Boppy's Boo Boo"	July 23, 2013
Patient: Boppy Note: Boppy was also known as "Bobby" in this short episode.
7	"Chilly McWillies"	July 24, 2013
Patient: Chilly
8	"Hippo's Rip"	July 25, 2013
Patient: Hallie
9	"Gustov's Gulp"	July 26, 2013
Patient: Gustov
10	"Mr. Chomp's Chompers"	September 20, 2013
Patient: Mr. Chomp

== Shorts ==
=== Doc McStuffins Toy Hospital: Pet Rescue (2018–19) ===
#	Episode	Original release date
1	Runaway Roller	November 5, 2018
2	Billions Of Bunnies	November 5, 2018
3	A Cuckoo Case	November 6, 2018
4	Make Way for the Ducklings	November 6, 2018
5	Birdies of a Feather	November 7, 2018
6	Dig It	November 7, 2018
7	Shell You Later	November 8, 2018
8	The Caterpillar Effect	November 9, 2018
9	Chinchilla Spa Day	November 10, 2018
10	Horsing Around	November 11, 2018
11	Wipeout Whale!	February 4, 2019
12	Kitty Go Round	February 5, 2019
13	Turbo Train	February 6, 2019
14	Snow Globe Rescue	February 7, 2019
15	Springing Leaks	February 8, 2019

=== Doc McStuffins Toy Hospital: Baby (2019) ===
#	Episode	Original release date
1	Three's Company	July 1, 2019
2	Tiny Tumbler	July 2, 2019
3	Peek-A-Boo!	July 3, 2019
4	Fussy Franny	July 4, 2019
5	Hide and Seek	July 5, 2019
6	Snuggle Sylvie	November 17, 2019
7	Stuffy's Little Dragon	November 18, 2019
8	Bumper Car Betsy	November 19, 2019
9	Lambie's Baaad Day	November 20, 2019
10	Scribble Scramble	November 21, 2019

=== Doc McStuffins Toy Hospital: Arctic Rescue (2019) ===
#	Episode	Original release date
1	I Am Yeti, Hear Me Roar	December 1, 2019
2	Chip Off the Ol' Block	December 2, 2019
3	Flip of the Iceberg	December 3, 2019
4	Sled Ahead	December 4, 2019
5	Tusk Trouble	December 5, 2019
6	Aurora Bear-ealis	December 6, 2019
7	Snowboard Girl	December 9, 2019
8	Polar Night	December 10, 2019
9	Tangled Tevin	December 11, 2019
10	On Thin Ice	December 13, 2019

=== Doc McStuffins Toy Hospital: Ultimate Safari (2020) ===
#	Episode	Original release date
1	Starstruck Sally	January 6, 2020
2	It's a Wash	January 7, 2020
3	Monkey Business	January 8, 2020
4	Zebra Crossing	January 9, 2020
5	Rockin' Croc	January 10, 2020
6	Repeat After Me	January 13, 2020
7	Tail Spin	January 14, 2020
8	The Cuddliest Lion	January 15, 2020
9	Steppe by Steppe	January 16, 2020
10	Hidden Tiger	January 17, 2020

=== Doc McStuffins: The Doc and Bella Are In! ===
#	Episode
1	Intern at the Clinic
2	Tools of the Trade
3	A Check In for a Check-Up
4	Lambie Gets a Crease
5	A Dragon's Tail
6	Emergency Bella
7	Sticky Bunny
8	Green Snowman
9	Bella's First Surgery
10	Graduation

== DJ Melodies ==
#	Episode	Original release date
1	Doc to the Rescue	May 18, 2015
2	Welcome to the Family	June 15, 2015
