= Stuffy =

Stuffy or stuffies may refer to:

== People ==
- Hugh Dowding (1882–1970), British Royal Air Force air chief marshal
- Stuffy McInnis (1890–1960), American Major League Baseball first baseman and manager
- Norbert Mueller (1906–1956), Canadian Olympic ice hockey player
- Simon Singer (born 1941), American world champion American handball player, and radio and television actor
- Stuffy Stewart (1894–1980), American professional baseball player
- Stephen Gilchrist, British musician

== Other uses ==
- Stuffy McStuffins, the dragon toy in the animated children's television series Doc McStuffins
- Stuffed clam, also known as "stuffies", a dish popular in New England,
- Stuffed animal, or stuffy, a toy or collector's item
- Stuffy/The Fuses, British alt-rock band

== See also ==
- Stuff (disambiguation)
