= Mother Goose (band) =

New Zealand rock band

Background information
- Origin: Dunedin, New Zealand
- Genres: Rock
- Years active: 1975–1984, 2007
- Labels: Mushroom Records
- Past members: Craig Johnston; Justin McCarthy; Marcel Rodeka; Pete Dickson; Kevin Collings; Steve Young; Denis Gibbins; Neil(Noah)Shilkin

Mother Goose was a 1970s New Zealand band formed in Dunedin, in 1975. Their novelty song "Baked Beans" was a substantial hit, but the group thereafter found the rock audience would not fully embrace their subsequent offerings.

== Moving across the Tasman Sea ==
After a successful concert in Albert Park, Auckland, Mother Goose decided to move to Australia, and started playing at Cloudland in Brisbane and at the Playroom on the Gold Coast, Queensland in late 1976. Their promoter, Ivan Dayman, contacted top Australian manager, Garry Spry, who flew up from Melbourne to see them and agreed to become their manager. He showcased the band at his Babes nightclub, and Mushroom Records offered them a recording contract, and their debut album, Stuffed, was released in 1977.

Bands such as Cold Chisel, Men at Work, The Angels, Midnight Oil, all started by opening for Mother Goose. In 1977, Mother Goose embarked on their first national tour with Supercharge.

== United States ==
By June 1978, Mother Goose had moved to the United States and were living in Hollywood, California, with their own recording studio and signed to Scotti Brothers Records. However after five months of songwriting and recording demos, they left the Scotti Brothers and moved to New York. There they signed with the entertainment agents, Mecca Artists, and with help of Sid Bernstein they started playing residencies at The Other End, Trax and The Great Gildersleeves. Contractual battles with the Scotti Brothers, coupled with Mother Goose’s refusal to conform prevented the band securing another major recording contract. Lead guitarist Peter Dickson left the band in February 1979, and returned to Australia and was replaced by the New York–based guitarist, Justin McCarthy. He remained with the band until they broke up in 1984.

== Late career ==
The band returned to Australia in 1979 after almost twelve months in the United States, and undertook their 'Catch Me If You Can Tour'. They recorded two more albums, Don't Believe in Fairytales (1979) and This is the Life (1982). Mother Goose continued touring Australia and Canada until they broke up in 1984.

Johnston and Rodeka joined The Incredible Penguins in 1985, which recorded a cover of "Happy Xmas (War Is Over)", a charity project with numerous guest musicians for research on little penguins, which peaked at #10 on the Australian Kent Music Report in December.

Mother Goose reformed on 23 March 2007 as part of a 30-year celebration of the Dunedin Sound. The concert was called Re:Sound. The other main acts were; The Chills, Sneaky Feelings, and The Clean.

== Members ==
- Craig Johnston (vocals) (sailor)
- Marcel Rodeka (drums) (pixie)
- Pete Dickson (lead guitar) (baby)
- Kevin Collings (rhythm guitar) (bumble bee)
- Steve Young (keyboards) (ballerina)
- Denis Gibbins (bass guitar) (Minnie Mouse)
- Justin McCarthy (lead guitar) - replaced Dickson in 1979
- Neil Shilkin (Noah Shilkin) (keyboards) - replaced Young in 1981

== Discography ==
=== Studio albums ===
List of albums, with Australian chart positions
Title	Album details	Peak chart positions
Title	Album details	AUS
Stuffed	Released: August 1977; Format: LP, Cassette; Label: Mushroom Records (L 36312)	23
Don't Believe in Fairytales	Released: 1979; Format: LP, Cassette; Label: Mushroom Records (L 37147)	62
This Is the Life	Released: 1982; Format: LP, Cassette; Label: Mushroom Records (L 37775)	-

=== Singles ===
List of singles, with Australian & New Zealand chart positions
Year	Title	Peak chart positions		Album
Year	Title	AUS	NZL	Album
1977	"Baked Beans" / "Moonshine Lady"	29	37	Stuffed
1977	"Moonshine Lady" / "Somebody Broke My Heart"	-	-	Stuffed
1978	"I Think It's You"	-	-	non-album single
1979	"Living in a Silent Movie"	-	-	Don't Believe in Fairytales
1979	"Saving for a Rainy Day"	-	-	Don't Believe in Fairytales
1982	"I Can't Sing Very Well"	-	-	non-album single
1982	"Margueritta and Me"	-	-	This Is The Life
1982	"Lonely Girls"	98	-	This Is The Life
1982	"Tonight" / "Welcome to Radio"	-	-	This Is The Life
1983	"Find a Way Out"	-	-	non-album single
