= Don't Believe in Fairytales =

Don't Believe In Fairy Tales

Studio album by Mother Goose
- Released: 1979
- Recorded: Richmond Reorders Melbourne Australia 1979
- Genre: Rock
- Label: Mushroom Records
- Producer: Ralph Moss

Don't Believe In Fairy Tales was the second album released by New Zealand band Mother Goose.

== Track listing ==
1. Living In A Silent Movie 4:31
2. Saving For A Rainy Day 4:44
3. Alice (It's Up To You) 4:24
4. Once Upon A Time 5:55
5. All the Kings Horses 4:10
6. Paint It Black 4:48
7. Taking A Chance On You 3:25
8. Soliloquy 1:45
9. Don't Believe In Fairy Tales 3:45

== Charts ==
Chart (1979)	Peak position
Australia (Kent Music Report)	62
