= Stuff =

Stuff, stuffed, and stuffing may refer to:

- Physical matter
- General, unspecific things, or entities

== Arts, media, and entertainment ==
=== Books ===
- Stuff (1997), a novel by Joseph Connolly
- Stuff (2005), a book by Jeremy Strong

=== Fictional characters ===
- Stuff the Chinatown Kid, the sidekick of Vigilante, a western-themed DC Comics character

=== Film ===
- The Stuff, a 1985 horror/comedy film by Larry Cohen
- Stuff (film), a 1993 documentary about John Frusciante's life
- Stuffed (film), upcoming body horror film

=== Illustration ===
- Henry Wright (1849–1937), worked for Vanity Fair under the pseudonym "Stuff"

=== Music ===
- Stuff (Holly McNarland album), 1997
- Stuff (Eleanor McEvoy album), 2014
- Stuff (band), a 1970s-1980s fusion/rhythm and blues music group
  - Stuff (Stuff album), 1976
- Stuff., a Belgian jazz ensemble
- Stuff, a 1992 album by Bill Wyman
- "Stuff" (Diamond Rio song), a 2000 single from the album One More Day
- "Stuff" (Lil Baby song), 2024
- Stuffed (album), by Mother Goose

=== Television ===
- "Stuff" (How I Met Your Mother), a 2007 episode from the sitcom How I Met Your Mother
- Alexei Sayle's Stuff, a BBC comedy sketch series

=== Media ===
- Stuff (magazine), a British consumer electronics magazine
- Stuff (company), New Zealand media company (formerly Fairfax New Zealand)
  - Stuff (website), the titular news website of the company

== Computing ==
- Bit stuffing, the insertion of noninformation bits into computerized data
- To compress files using StuffIt

== Food and biology ==
- Stuffing, edible mixture, used to fill a cavity in another food item or served as a side dish
- An animal preserved by means of taxidermy
- To be beyond satiety after a meal

== People with the surname ==
- Christian Stuff (born 1982), German footballer

== Textile products ==
- Stuff (cloth), a generic term for woven fabrics
- Stuffed toy, a children's toy sewn from a textile and filled with soft matter
- A clothing line by singer Hilary Duff
