= Chris Nee =

Irish-American children's television screenwriter and producer

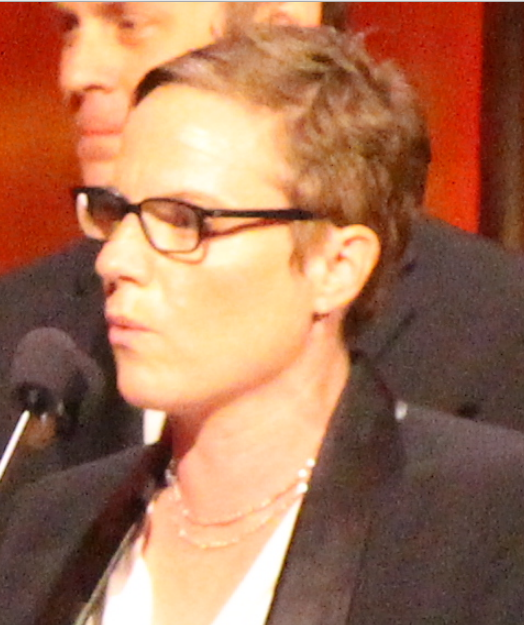
- Nee pictured accepting the Peabody for Doc McStuffins
- Born: Christine Nee; 1968 or 1969 (age 57–58)
- Occupations: Screenwriter; producer
- Years active: 1996–present
- Notable work: Doc McStuffins; Vampirina
- Children: 1

Christine Nee (born 1968 or 1969) is an American children's television screenwriter, animator, producer, and voice actress. Nee is best known as the creator of Doc McStuffins, which she conceived as Cheers for preschoolers. She has previously worked as an associate producer on several international versions of Sesame Street. Chris Nee worked at Araneo, a production company in Belgium.

== Career ==
Nee said that while she did not originally connect with any shows because she did not see herself "represented onscreen," she first tried to be an actor. Realizing she could not fit in, she worked on scripts for Blue's Clues in 2001 and Wonder Pets, continuing to work as a producer, the latter on Deadliest Catch for two episodes.

Nee conceived of her award-winning series, Doc McStuffins while in the shower after her son had visited the doctor for asthma a few days before. It was her idea to make the lead character female and she readily agreed when Nancy Kanter, the creative head of Disney Junior, suggested that she should be African-American. Although some at Disney were hesitant originally that a show with a female lead "might not have mass appeal," this did not deter Kanter, and within a year of the series' premiere in 2012, "merchandise generated about $500 million in sales." Nee said she was very pleased that her character had unusual background for a TV character, and hoped this would influence the next generation.

Nee was the executive producer and developer of the Disney Junior series, Vampirina, based on the children's picture book Vampirina Ballerina. The series, which featured many of the same staff who worked on Doc McStuffins, premiered on October 1, 2017, and ended on June 28, 2021, after 3 seasons and 75 episodes during its 4-year run.

In April 2019, Nee joined other WGA writers in firing their agents as part of the WGA's stand against the ATA and the practice of packaging.

On July 4, 2021, a 10-part series of animated music videos, which Nee created, titled We the People, premiered on Netflix. Kenya Barris was also a showrunner and the series was produced by Michelle Obama and Barack Obama. On July 13, 2021, Ridley Jones, an animated series for children, debuted on the same network. The series was part of a slate of animated preschool series on the streaming service, with others including Spirit Rangers, and Ada Twist, Scientist (co-produced with Belgium’s Araneo), of which Nee is the showrunner. Dino Daycare was originally part of this slate.

On April 29, 2022, it was announced that Dino Daycare was scrapped. However, it might find a new home in a different streaming service.

== Personal life ==
Nee is of Irish descent. At age 18, during the 1980s, Nee came out as a lesbian. In June 2021, she described herself as a gay and "relatively butch" woman. She has one child.

== Filmography ==
=== Television ===
Year	Title	Notes
1999–2000	Out of the Box	Writer (3 episodes)
2000–2001	Angela Anaconda	Writer (4 episodes)
2001	Blue's Clues	Writer (2 episodes)
2001–2003	Little Bill	Writer (5 episodes)
2003–2005	Oobi	Head writer (season 2), staff writer (season 3)
2004	Maya & Miguel	Writer (3 episodes)
2004–2007	Unfabulous	Writer (16 episodes)
2004–2007	Higglytown Heroes	Writer (4 episodes)
2005	Deadliest Catch	Producer (2 episodes)
2005–2007	American Dragon: Jake Long	Writer (6 episodes)
2006–2008	The Backyardigans	Writer (3 episodes)
2006–2009	Wonder Pets!	Writer (unknown episodes)
2007	Johnny and the Sprites	Teleplay, writer (3 episodes)
2008–2010	Ni Hao, Kai-Lan	Writer, story editor (12 episodes)
2009	Cyberchase	Writer (ep. "Spellbound")
2009	Casper's Scare School	Writer (3 episodes)
2010	Olivia	Writer (ep. "Olivia Talks Turkey")
2011	Guess How Much I Love You	Writer (ep. "The Nest")
2011–2012	Special Agent Oso	Writer (2 episodes)
2012–2020	Doc McStuffins	Creator, executive producer, voice of Emmie and Alma's mother
2013–2014	Henry Hugglemonster	Writer, lyricist (9 episodes)
2017	Nella the Princess Knight	Writer (1 episode)
2017–2021	Vampirina	Creator, executive producer, writer, lyricist

=== Streaming television ===
Year	Title	Notes
2021	We the People	Creator, executive producer
2021–2023	Ridley Jones	Creator, executive producer, writer, lyricist, and voice of Ma
2021–2023	Ada Twist, Scientist	Creator, executive producer
2022–2024	Spirit Rangers	Executive producer
