= Carin Greenberg =

American television writer

- Born: September 17, 1959 (age 67); New York City
- Education: Yale University B.A.
- Known for: Writer, story editor and producer

Carin Greenberg (born September 17, 1959) is a writer, story editor and producer of children’s entertainment. She is a Peabody finalist and winner of three Daytime Emmys, two Annie Awards and a Writers Guild Award. She wrote a series of children's books under the name Carin "Greenberg" Baker.

== Life and career ==
Greenberg was born on September 17, 1959, in New York City, to Eastern European parents Elaine Kussack, an actress, and Lawrence J. Greenberg, a U.S. Air Force officer. As a child, Greenberg acted in television and film. In 1980, she graduated with a Bachelor of Arts from Yale University and subsequently attended Georgetown University Law Center. She left law school to begin a writing career, starting out as a copywriter for advertisements and later becoming a ghostwriter of young adult books. In 1992, she began publishing her Karate Club series of children's books; at the time of writing them, she practiced karate and her husband operated a karate school.

She was an executive producer and co-creator of the Discovery Kids animated show Growing Up Creepie, which ran from 2006 to 2008. She wrote scripts for the PBS children's show Between the Lions, and was part of the team that won a 2004 Daytime Emmy for the series.

== Credits ==
Greenberg was the writer of the HBO family special, The Weight of the Nation for Kids: Quiz Ed!, which received a 2013 Primetime Emmy nomination for Outstanding Children’s Television Program; Story Editor/Writer for Disney Junior's Octonauts; Co-Producer of a live-action pilot, The Adventures of Taxi Dog; Co-Creator and Executive Producer of Discovery Kids' Growing Up Creepie (Daytime Emmy nomination); Supervising Producer and TV developer of ToddWorld, (three Emmy nominations; two Humanitas nominations); Executive Story Editor for PBS's Dragon Tales, HBO’s Harold and the Purple Crayon (Humanitas nomination) and A Little Curious, 101 Dalmatians: The Series (two Daytime Emmy nominations), and Ghostwriter (Writers Guild Award winner). Greenberg has also written episodes for numerous series including Between the Lions (Emmy winner and additional Emmy nomination), Doc McStuffins, Sheriff Callie's Wild West, and Angelina Ballerina: The Next Steps, among many others.

Greenberg has written for Nickelodeon since the mid-1990s, including the shows Allegra's Window, Gullah Gullah Island, Wonder Pets, The Backyardigans, Winx Club, Bubble Guppies, and Dora the Explorer. She is also the co-executive producer and story editor of Kinderwood for Nickelodeon's Noggin app.

Greenberg is the co-creator, writer and executive producer of Quarantween: the Musical for TheaterWorksUSA. She has developed television projects with numerous networks and studios, including as the co-executive producer, story editor and writer for seasons 2-4 of Amazon Prime Video's Tumble Leaf; co-creator/writer of Destination Solar System, an immersive, live space adventure that played at the planetaria in Chicago, Denver and Nashville; head writer of MGA Entertainment's Lalaloopsy.

She is an executive producer of the children's animated series, Weather Hunters, which released in September 2025.

== Personal life ==
On June 23, 1990, she married David Arthur Baker, who owned and operated a karate school. They later divorced. On September 16, 2006, she married Thomas Patrick O’Donnell, a research scientist.
