= Stuffed (album) =

Studio album by Mother Goose
- Released: 1977
- Recorded: Armstrong Studios, Melbourne
- Length: 43:23
- Label: Mushroom Records
- Producer: Mother Goose, Ross Cockle

Stuffed is the debut album released by Melbourne-based New Zealand Mother Goose. The album spawned their biggest hit Baked Beans, a novelty song purporting the romance-promoting properties of the titular dish.

== Track list ==
Side One

1. Moonshine Lady (Steve Young) - 4:10
2. Somebody Broke My Heart (Young, Pete Dickson, Craig Johnson) - 4:03
3. Last of The Fools (Young, Dickson, Johnston, Kevin Collings, Denis Gibbens, Marcel Rodeka) - 6:36
4. (Some Day You'll Be Sorry) Anne Marie (Johnston, Dickson) - 5:23

Side Two

1. Land Ho (Young) - 5:38
2. See If I Care (Johnston, Dickson, Young) - 4:27
3. Only You (Young) - 3:16
4. Only A Phone Call Away (Young, Dickson, Johnston, Collings, Gibbens, Rodeka) - 5:13
5. Baked Beans (Young, Dickson, Johnston, Collings, Gibbens, Rodeka) - 3:42

== Charts ==
Chart (1977)	Peak position
Australia (Kent Music Report)	23

== Personnel ==
- Craig Johnston - lead vocals
- Pete Dickson - lead guitar, backing vocals
- Kevin Collings - rhythm guitar, backing vocals
- Steve Young - keyboards, backing vocals
- Denis Gibbins - bass, backing vocals
- Marcel Rodeka - drums, percussion

== Technical ==
- Mother Goose - producers, cover concept
- Ross Cockle - producer, engineer
- Kym Faehse - artwork, design
