= Doc McStuffins =

Animated children's TV series

- Also known as: Doc McStuffins: Toy Hospital (season 4); Doc McStuffins: Pet Rescue / Baby / Ultimate Safari / Arctic Rescue / Toy Hospital (season 5)
- Genre: Preschool
- Created by: Chris Nee
- Voices of: Kiara Muhammad; Laya DeLeon Hayes; Lara Jill Miller; Robbie Rist; Jess Harnell; Loretta Devine; Jaden Isaiah Betts; Andre Robinson; Kimberly Brooks; Gary Anthony Williams
- Opening theme: "Doc McStuffins Theme Song" by: China Anne McClain (seasons 1–3); Amber Riley (seasons 4–5)
- Ending theme: "Doc McStuffins Theme Song" (instrumental)
- Composers: Stuart Kollmorgen (score); Doug Califano (additional score; seasons 4–5); Michelle Lewis (songs); Kay Hanley (songs); Dan Petty (songs; seasons 3–5)
- Countries of origin: United States; Ireland
- Original language: English
- No. of seasons: 5
- No. of episodes: 136 (247 segments) (list of episodes)

Production
- Executive producers: Chris Nee; Darragh O'Connell; Cathal Gaffney; Kent Redeker (seasons 3–4); Michael Olson (season 5); Norton Virgien (season 5); Michael Stern (season 5)
- Producers: Gillian Higgins; Theresa Mayer; Colm Tyrrell (seasons 3–5); Edel Byrne (season 5); Nathan Santell (season 5); Méabh Tammemägi (season 5)
- Animators: Sparky Animation (seasons 1–4); DQ Entertainment (season 5)
- Running time: 11 minutes (seasons 1–4); 22–23 minutes (special episodes in seasons 2–4 and season 5); 45–46 minutes (special episodes in seasons 4–5)
- Production company: Brown Bag Films

Original release
- Network: Disney Junior
- Release: March 23, 2012 – April 18, 2020

Related
- The Doc Files

Doc McStuffins is an animated children's television series created by Chris Nee and produced by Brown Bag Films. It aired for five seasons on Disney Junior from March 23, 2012, to April 18, 2020. The series centers on a girl who fixes toys, with help from her four toy friends. The series features songs written and composed by Michelle Lewis, Kay Hanley, and Dan Petty.

The series received positive reviews due to the series' concept and the main character, as well as its portrayal of African Americans (Nee stated in 2013 that Doc is African American, as proposed by Disney during her initial pitch, Nee initially only knowing she wanted a girl doctor) in a Disney series. Nee conceived the series as Cheers for preschoolers.

On November 16, 2016, Disney Junior renewed the series for a fifth season. On April 4, 2018, Lara Jill Miller, the voice of Lambie, stated that the series finale had been recorded. The series ended on April 18, 2020, ending the series' original run after five seasons, and there are no plans for the show to have a sixth season. Reruns continued to air through June 26, 2024. The show is available on DisneyNOW and Disney+.

A total of 136 episodes (247 segments) were originally produced, making it the longest running Disney Jr. original series by episode count. However, it is expected to be surpassed by Spidey and His Amazing Friends following preemptive renewals for a sixth and seventh season in June 2025 and August 2026 respectively.

The Doc is 10, a special made to celebrate the series' 10th anniversary, debuted on August 26, 2022.

== Premise ==
The series chronicles freckled, 6-year-old Dottie "Doc" McStuffins who decides she wants to become a doctor like her mother, a pediatrician. She practices for her dream job by fixing toys and dolls.

When she activates her magic stethoscope, she can create a variety of supernatural effects, including traveling through time. Her most regular use of it in the TV series is to cause toys, dolls, and stuffed animals to come to life. They are able to move, speak, sing songs, pick up things, hear, see, and smell odors, and she can interact with them. With the help from her four stuffed animals—Lambie, Stuffy, Chilly, and Hallie—Doc helps toys recover or "feel better" by giving them check-ups and diagnosing their fictional illnesses with an encyclopedia called "The Big Book of Boo Boos" and another encyclopedia called "The Big Vet Book" for her toy pets when she's a veterinarian. In season 4, the Big Book of Boo Boos and The Big Vet Book go hi-tech in a tablet form.

Each 11-minute episode includes original songs. During ending credits in season 1, Doc gives advice to viewers about staying healthy. Seasons 1 and 2 have the original intro for the theme song, but in season 3, the spoken line by Doc at the end of the theme song — including the giggling — was re-recorded with Doc's new voice. In season 3, Doc opens up a veterinary clinic for fixing toy pets in addition to the regular medical services that she provides for the other toys. In season 4, Doc's grandma reveals her own magical stethoscope and teleports her and Doc to McStuffinsville, a magical city populated by living toys, and puts Doc in charge of the McStuffinsville Hospital. In season 5, Doc and her toys put together the McStuffinsville Pet Rescue Team, where they work together to rescue pets in need, led by her plush dragon Stuffy who is a great pet vet.

Each episode focuses on Doc and her crew helping another toy in need, and after each check-up, gives each toy advice from anything that has happened to her or other circumstances. In some episodes, a member of Doc's crew ended up being the toy in need and even Doc herself being the patient with the toys caring for her in the same way she had.

== Episodes ==
Season	Segments	Episodes	Originally released	
Season	Segments	Episodes	First released	Last released
1	52	26	March 23, 2012	May 3, 2013
The Doc Files	—N/a	10	July 22, 2013	April 15, 2014
2	72	37	September 6, 2013	September 12, 2015
3	56	29	July 11, 2015	April 25, 2016
4	50	28	July 29, 2016	March 2, 2018
5	—N/a	16	October 26, 2018	April 18, 2020

== Characters ==
=== Main ===
- Dottie "Doc" McStuffins (voiced by Kiara Muhammad in seasons 1–2 and Laya DeLeon Hayes in seasons 3–5) is the main character of the series and the title character, who is a 6-year-old girl who likes to fix her four stuffed animals (Lambie, Stuffy, Chilly, and Hallie), and wants to be a doctor like her mother one day. She has a magical toy stethoscope which is her form of communication with all of the toys.
- Lambie (voiced by Lara Jill Miller) is a stuffed lamb who is one of Doc's friends. She is very sweet, likes hugs, and is a gifted dancer. Her other friends are Stuffy, Chilly, and Hallie. She has a crush on Stuffy, seeing as she gives him the most cuddles. Lambie also idolizes Dress-Up Daisy and hopes to be a fashionista like her.
- Stuffy (voiced by Robbie Rist) is a stuffed blue dragon who tries to be the bravest of all, but he does not succeed at that every time, especially with spiders as he has arachnophobia. He is also a little clumsy. He is one of Doc's friends and his other friends are Lambie, Chilly, and Hallie. His design is partially inspired by Figment from the Epcot ride Journey Into Imagination at Walt Disney World in Florida.
- Chilly (voiced by Jess Harnell) is a stuffed snowman who is a hypochondriac and does not always seem sure that he isn't a real snowman. He is really sweet and one of Doc's more fearful friends. He is also friends with Lambie, Stuffy, and Hallie.
- Hallie (voiced by Loretta Devine) is a stuffed purple hippopotamus who is Doc's assistant as a nurse. She is friendly and treats Doc's patients with respect and good care. She is good friends with Doc and the other stuffed animals, and has somewhat of a Radar O'Reilly intuition as to what Doc needs during an exam, which she calls a "Hippo Hunch" and sometimes acts like a drill sergeant.
- Squeakers is a purple squeaky blowfish who can go in water like Hermie, Marvin, Surfer Girl, Melinda the Mermaid, Bronty and Lula. He is also a main character in the first 3 seasons and a guest star character in seasons 4–5.

=== Recurring ===
- Donny McStuffins (voiced by Jaden Betts in seasons 1–2 and Andre Robinson in seasons 2–5) is Doc's 4-year-old brother who usually spends most of his time playing with his toy cars and his friends. He owns the toy knight action figure named Sir Kirby. He is also a main character in the first 3 seasons and a guest star character in season 5.
- Dr. Maisha McStuffins/Mom (voiced by Kimberly Brooks) is the mother of Doc and Donny and the wife of Mr. McStuffins. She is a pediatrician who works at a clinic. She's touched that Doc wants to become a doctor like herself. She is also a main character in the first 3 seasons and a guest star character in seasons 4–5.
- Mr. Marcus McStuffins/Dad (voiced by Gary Anthony Williams) – Mostly a stay-at-home father, but indicated in the episode "The New Girl" to have a part-time job who usually cooks dinner while his wife is at work. He takes care of his children, Doc and Donny. He is also a main character in the first 3 seasons and a guest star character in seasons 4–5.
- Lois McStuffins (voiced by Dawnn Lewis) is Doc, Donny, and Maya's paternal grandmother. It is revealed in the "Toy Hospital" series that she can also speak to toys and has a magical stethoscope like Doc. She created "McStuffinsville".
- Maya Alana McStuffins (voiced by Kari Wahlgren) is Doc and Donny's newly adopted baby sister, referred to as "Baby McStuffins" before being named.
- Emmie (voiced by Kylee Anderson in seasons 1–2, Daniella Jones in seasons 2–3, and Zoe Pessin in season 3) is the girl next door, Doc's soccer teammate, and best human friend.
- Alma (voiced by Caitlin Carmichael) is Emmie's younger sister.
- Emmie and Alma's Mom (voiced by Chris Nee)
- Luca Stevens (voiced by Buddy Handleson in season 1 and Luke Ganalon in season 2) is Donny's best friend.
- Rudy is Emmie and Alma's terrier puppy.
- Will Wright (voiced by Jay Gragnani) is Donny's friend, who owns Riggo.
- Carlos Ortiz (voiced by Elan Garfias in seasons 1–2 and Teo Briones in seasons 2–3) is Doc and Donny's neighbor who owns Star Blazer Zero.
- Henry Diloy (voiced by Curtis Harris in seasons 1–2 and Justice Griffin in season 3) is Doc and Donny's neighbor who owns Aurora.
- Tisha McStuffins (voiced by China Anne McClain) is Doc and Donny's paternal older cousin. She is the daughter of Marcus' older sister.
- Tobias (voiced by Tony Hale) is a christmas elf.
- Santa Claus (voiced by Jeffrey Tambor) is a beloved holiday icon.
- Katherine (voiced by Mela Lee) is Doc and Donny's babysitter neighbor who once owned Dress-Up Daisy.
- Jacob (voiced by Gunnar Sizemore) is the boy in the park, who owns Super Stuntman Steve.
- Dr. Peerless (voiced by Alexandra Ryan) is a doctor who works in the same clinic as Doctor McStuffins.
- Declan Smith (voiced by Matthew Wayne) is a shy boy who befriends Doc at the clinic.
- Hattie (voiced by Loretta Devine) is a nurse at the clinic that is like a human version of Hallie.
- Maddie (voiced by Angie Wu) is the girl in the park who owns Norton.
- Ramona Marcus (voiced by Grace Kaufman) is the owner of Dart the Unicorn.
- Ian Sheridan (voiced by Rio Mangini) is one of Doc's neighbors who is the owner of Wildlife Will.
- Tamara (voiced by Kyla Kenedy) is one of Donny's friends who owns Southwest Sal.
- Sabrina (voiced by Raven Walker) is Doc and Donny's paternal younger cousin.
- Nia (voiced by Cherami Leigh) is one of the patients at Doctor Maisha McStuffins' clinic.
- Florence Nightingale (voiced by Joanne Froggatt)
- Audrey (voiced by Trinitee Stokes)
- Dev (voiced by Julian Zane) is a 7-year-old boy who is accidentally transported to McStuffinsville and becomes the leader of the McStuffinsville's First Responders.

=== Toys ===
- Angus (voiced by Rob Paulsen) is an Australian-accented Karate Kangaroo who has a fear of fighting.
- Anna (voiced by Meghan Strange) is a stuffed monkey. She, along with her brother, Ben, can stick to each other. She belongs to Doc's friend, Alma. She had to stay at Doc's house overnight while Ben was getting his hand recovered back at the clinic.
- Aurora (voiced by Laraine Newman) is a telescope belonging to Henry, who speaks in 60's hippie lingo and walks on her tripod. In the episode "Starry, Starry Night", her vision was strangely blurred, and Doc led a search in Henry's yard to find Aurora's missing eyepiece.
- Awesome Guy (voiced by David Boat) is a toy superhero that belongs to Donny. In the episode "Righty-on-Lefty", he had to rescue Lambie from a tree, but there was a problem with his legs. Doc wanted to give him a checkup, but he didn't want to get one, and then later Stuffy had an idea to sneak him in. Doc found out the problem: his legs were put on the wrong way. So when Doc fixed them, he was back in action.
- Bella (voiced by Julianne Buescher) is a Russian-accented ballerina like Lambie, only she is human and wears a blue outfit. She accidentally cracked her leg after a leap and had to have it put in a cast, but she found lots to do while she waited for it to heal.
- Ben (voiced by Jeffrey Nicholas Brown) is a stuffed monkey. He, along with his sister, Anna, can stick to each other. He belongs to Doc's friend, Alma. He had to be fixed when his Velcro sticker ripped off and he also had to stay in the clinic for the night in order for it to heal, causing him to be separated from Anna overnight.
- Big Jack (voiced by Ty Burrell in "Out of the Box" and Tom Cavanagh in "Chip Off the Ol' Box") is a jack-in-the-box, with a joker popping out when the handle turns. In the episode "Chip Off the Ol' Box", he hurts his crank after Donny crashes into him while practicing some defensive soccer save moves. Big Jack is the father of Little Jack.
- Boomer (voiced by Dave B. Mitchell) is a soccer ball that belongs to Emmie. He was flat due to a leak, but was scared of the needle in the air pump Doc had to use.
- Boppy (voiced by James Arnold Taylor) is a blue inflatable punching bag shaped like a dog, who usually cannot be knocked down. He found himself losing air after a rosebush popped him, and was taken in by Doc for patching and reinflation. In "The Doc Files" episode "Boppy's Boo Boo", Boppy was also known as "Bobby".
- Bonnie Blue is a toy horse on wheels which Sir Kirby rides on. Bonnie Blue was also in "Dusty Bear" as Stuffy's horse when he pretended to be a cowboy.
- Bronty (voiced by Jeffrey Nicholas Brown) is a Brontosaurus toy from the Tank Toy Grabber crane machine in which Donny won who loves to run around and to swim.
- Bubble Monkey (voiced by Hynden Walch) is a monkey that blows bubbles and belongs to Emmie and Alma. She had to stop blowing bubbles when Alma took her to the dentist for her check up.
- Buddy (voiced by Jess Harnell) is a dump truck toy that belongs to Donny. Buddy is Riggo's best friend (based on the Buddy-L line of toy trucks). He speaks in a Brooklyn accent.
- Carl Chug-a-Chug is a streamlined steam locomotive friction powered toy who resides in Doctor McStuffins' clinic.
- Celeste (voiced by Kath Soucie) is a projector toy who can project the entire Solar System.
- Choo-Choo Train is a wooden toy train who is used either as an ambulance to move the smaller injured toys or as a getaway vehicle for the Wicked King. Despite having a face, he doesn't speak.
- Commander Crush (voiced by Steve Blum) is a blue with a sky blue armor-like body and yellow outlines special transformers-like toy that turns into a 4-year-old version of himself until Tobias accidentally broke one of his gears. However, he is soon fixed. He considers himself "space buddies forever" with Star Blazer Zero, but was sad when Zero had to move away with his kid, Carlos. His catchphrase is "Space-tastic!"
- Curly-Q, also known as Q, (voiced by Cherami Leigh), is a doll who is the newest member of "The Waiting Room Toys" who didn't like her original hairstyle and wanted a new hairstyle.
- Dart (voiced by Catherine Cavadini) is a toy unicorn that belongs to Ramona, which Doc almost stumbles over, causing her to sprain her ankle.
- Dolly (voiced by Alexandra Ryan) is a Fairy Princess Rag Doll who resides in Doctor McStuffins' clinic.
- Dragon-Bot (voiced by Jack Conely) is a Hi-Tech Robotic Dragon toy that belongs to Donny, whom Stuffy becomes jealous of because he is more "hi-tech" than him.
- Dress-Up Daisy (voiced by Amy Sedaris in seasons 1–2 and Grey Griffin in seasons 2–5) is a fashion doll who has a fashionable view on things that once belonged to Katherine when she was Doc's age and was presumed lost after a gust of wind took her away while wearing a parachutist outfit.
- The Dude (voiced by Jess Harnell) is a stuffed snowman. In the episode "Chilly and the Dude", Chilly got jealous when he feels that The Dude is more charming and athletic than him, but then learns that it is okay to be yourself.
- Fabulous Fabio (voiced by Jess Harnell) is an Italian-accented toy that "grows" hair, which he likes to shake, using a Play-Doh type clay who resides in Doctor McStuffins' Clinic.
- Frida Fairy (voiced by Sutton Foster) is a cute toy fairy kite who thinks she is a real magical fairy.
- Gabby (voiced by Lacey Chabert) is a toy giraffe that Doc won in the Tank Toy Grabber game at the arcade. She had a ripped leg, so when Doc fixed it, she decided to take her home.
- The Glider Brothers: Orville (voiced by Sam Riegel) and Wilbur (voiced by David Kaufman) are a pair of rubber band-powered gliders who love to fly. Wilbur once broke his rubber band that powers his propeller, and Doc fixed him.
- Glo-Bo (voiced by Jim Belushi) is a friendly toy monster with six arms and a joyful personality. Neglected for several weeks when Donny got a new train, Glo-Bo consulted Doc about his lost ability to glow in the dark. He also inadvertently spread a rash to many toys, including Chilly, in "Caught Blue-Handed".
- Gloria (voiced by Lori Alan) is a purple stuffed toy gorilla owned by Donny who loves to laugh. Parts of her are made of leather.
- Gustave (voiced by Stephen Stanton) is a green Cajun-accented plastic alligator and appetite for marbles. He is one of the four mechanical players in Donny's game "Gulpy-Gulpy Gators". Doc had to empty his stomach after Donny added extra marbles to the game and Gustave wound up overstuffed. He also once got himself stuck in a fence gate while chasing a runaway marble, and Doc and the other toys try to set him free without injuring him in the process.
- Hermie (voiced by Ari Rubin) is a toy crab that Doc, Squeakers, and Marvin can play with in the water. He once lost an arm after a rough run-in with Rudi the puppy.
- Johnny Foosball (voiced by Josh Keaton) is a star goalie from a foosball game who kept on getting stuck during every game he played.
- Kiko (voiced by Janice Kawaye) is a Japanese anime/manga doll which Doc got from her Grandma. Her problem was having frail legs and being stuck in her box from her long flight from Tokyo, Japan, but Doc helped her exercise.
- Lenny (voiced by Jeff Fischer) is a toy firetruck that belongs to Donny, and is also known as Engine 9. Donny put him in the pile of toys that he doesn't play with anymore because he didn't squirt out any water from his hose. Doc refilled him with water and returned himself to Donny.
- Leliani (voiced by Liza Del Mundo) is a solar-powered hula girl from Hawaii. She inspires and Doc and the rest of the toys to have a luau.
- Lil' Egghead (also known as Eggie) (voiced by Peter MacNicol) is a handheld electronic learning toy. He is known as an intelligent rival to Professor Hootsburgh. In the episode "L'il Egghead Feels the Heat", he overheats and breaks down, starting to malfunction due to the sun, so Doc fixes him.
- Little Jack (also known as Little J) (voiced by Brady Tutton in "Out of the Box" and "Chip Off the Ol' Box") is the son of Big Jack. He had trouble popping out from his box. He was scared to get a checkup, but then, he learns that it wasn't scary. Then Doc found out that his clothes were stuck between the cogs of the music box.
- Loud Louie (voiced by Georgina Cordova) (also known as George Kidder) is a toy cellphone that Doc used to play with when she was little. He was loud because he was super excited, so he had to learn to use his inside voice.
- Lula (voiced by Grey DeLisle) is a sponge toy that looks like a Beluga whale. When Lula is placed in the water, it takes only a couple of hours for her to grow, and in the end, she has grown to fit in the fish tank in Doc's clinic.
- Marvin (voiced by Tom Kenny) is Doc's rubber ducky who lost his squeaker at the water park.
- Melinda (voiced by Dharbi Jens in her first two appearances and G. K. Bowes in her third appearance) is a plastic toy mermaid that was found at the kiddie pool. She had trouble swimming because her winder-upper was stuck and she didn't take swimming lessons, so when she took them, she can finally swim.
- Millie the Microphone (voiced by Lisa Loeb) is Emmie's toy CD boombox. Millie kept repeating words when she spoke and when she sang with Doc and Emmie because her disc was dirty inside her. Once Doc cleaned it off, she was back to normal.
- Moo Moo (voiced by Colette Whitaker) is a stuffed cow that belongs to Alma, who drags out her long u's when she speaks, so it sounds like she's actually mooing. Once, she didn't want to go back to Alma after being left out in the rain.
- Morton (voiced by Jess Harnell) is a stuffed toy lion who resides in Doctor McStuffins' clinic.
- Mr. Chomp (voiced by Brad Abrell) is the plastic toy shark that belongs to Donny, who is very kindhearted and doesn't bite like a real shark.
- Norton (voiced by Tim Dadabo) is a toy wind-up mouse who belongs to Maddie. He can do flips.
- Niles (voiced by Charlie Schlatter) is Donny's toy crane. He had a bandage on his crane because it was unfixable, but Niles didn't want his bandage changed because he was nervous about getting it removed, and later, he was brave enough to get his old bandage removed slowly and quickly.
- Officer Pete (voiced by Michael Gough) is Donny's metal toy police car who takes his job very seriously and overheated while pursuing the Wicked King on a very hot summer day in "Hot Pursuit".
- Peaches Pie (voiced by Paula Rhodes) is Alma's sweet-smelling doll who smells like peaches, but was dragged outside into the rain-soaked yard by Rudy and lost her scent.
- Penny Possum (voiced by Audrey Wasilewski) is a possum who is the mother of three possum children, Pip, Flip, and Trip. The children went missing when one of Penny's velcro patches ripped loose.
- Pickles (voiced by Colleen O'Shaughnessey) is a stuffed bunny that wears bows on her ears and has a heart on her chest. She was in a box at Alma's yard sale and left because she thought that she wasn't loved anymore. Later, Doc finds out that Pickles' triangle nose is missing and replaces it with a button and soon, Doc returns Pickles to Alma and puts her in her room. She was named "Pickles" after Alma's favorite snack, which are pickles.
- Professor Hootsburgh (also known as "Hootsie") (voiced by Laraine Newman) is a British-accented stuffed owl with a very smart brain. Doc got her from her older cousin, Tisha. When Tisha first gave Hootsburgh to Doc, she couldn't read properly because of her poor eyesight, so Doc gave her glasses. In the episode "Professor Pancake", she gets flattened under Doc's toy box.
- Ricardo Racecar (voiced by Ian Gomez in "Run Down Race Car" and Robbie Rist in later episodes) is Donny's possibly Italian toy race car who lost energy because Donny raced him overnight and didn't let him recharge, but when Doc's dad put him onto charge, he was soon better.
- Riggo (voiced by Dennis Farina) is a grader toy that belongs to Will. Riggo is Buddy's best friend. In the episode "Stuck Up", his scooper was stuck because there was sand on the side of his scoop, jamming his gears. But Doc didn't figure this out until she accidentally got sand in her eye.
- Rita (voiced by Molly Shannon) is a toy cheetah that belongs to Donny who is very fast. However, Chilly and the other toys thought she might be sick because of her spots when they first met her.
- Robot Ray (voiced by Dee Bradley Baker) is Donny's battery-operated robot who considers himself a rescuer like Ronda, but once found out that he can't get wet. In the episode "All Washed Up", Ray is equipped with long-range vision and a white cord he shoots out with his right hand, extending his reach. He was also at Hallie's birthday and went camping with Doc, Donny and their dad in the episode "Out in the Wild". He broke his sticky launcher, but Doc used first-aid to fix his arm till the end of the campout.
- Rescue Ronda (voiced by Camryn Manheim) is the remote-control helicopter that belongs to Luca. Her job and passion is rescue missions and has ended up in Doc's clinic more than once with damage taken in the line of duty. If Rescue Ronda can't perform a rescue herself, she'll direct her friends on how to help. She serves as an aerial ambulance for the toy hospital. Her name is a reference to the song "Help Me, Rhonda" by The Beach Boys.
- Rosie the Rescuer (voiced by Nika Futterman) is a toy ambulance that belongs to Emmie and Alma. She likes to rescue things, but suffered from severe panic attacks. She serves as an ambulance for the toy hospital.
- Sebastian (voiced by Dee Bradley Baker) is a ghost that lives in a toy pumpkin who was once scared of Halloween, but then, Doc explains to him that it's all pretend, and then he decides to go back to his job. His sensor was also broken, making him pop out of his pumpkin, but Doc fixed it.
- Sir Kirby (voiced by Rob Paulsen) is an armoured knight action figure, who is one of Donny's toys. He often plays the hero in Doc's game "Save Princess Lambie", but not without taking some damage. He is friendly, but when someone does something mean like the Wicked King being rude for instance, that's when he will take action. Sir Kirby also has a crush on Lambie.
- Star Blazer Zero (voiced by John Michael Higgins) is a toy alien who pilots a rocket ship. His catchphrases are "Kazowie" and "Kazow". His arms and legs once fell off because he didn't have a seat belt.
- Southwest Sal (voiced by Laraine Newman) is a toy cowgirl who is a literal cow. She holds a lasso which works via a spring and belongs to Donny's friend, Tamara.
- Sproingo Boingo is a fox-shaped Slinky toy.
- Spritzy Mitzi (voiced by Angelique Perri) is an octopus-shaped water sprinkler toy that ruptured a sprinkler tentacle after getting a pebble stuck in it. She talks like a rapper and uses phrases like "poppin'" and "solid".
- Super Stuntman Steve (voiced by Mike Vaughn) is an extreme stunt motorcyclist action figure who belongs to Jacob.
- Surfer Girl (voiced by Kimberly Brooks) is a teen girl doll with her feet attached to a surfboard who speaks in Surfer Lingo.
- Susie Sunshine (voiced by Amber Hood) is a plastic toy doll. She was cranky because her eyes were stuck open due to some residue of a melted pineapple ice pop that was stuck on her eyelash.
- Sydney (voiced by Steve Blum) is a Karate Kangaroo who is a partner with Angus who loves to fight. Just like Angus, he also speaks in an Australian accent.
- Teddy Bear (also known as Bear) (voiced by James Arnold Taylor) is a salmon-colored teddy bear from the Tank Toy grabber crane machine.
- Teddy B. (voiced by Jason Marsden) is Donny's teddy bear who was reunited, but caused Donny to sneeze due to an excess of dust on his fur for being laying around and not being played with for ages.
- Tiny Tessie (voiced by Katie Leigh) is a baby doll who is always in her stroller named the "Sleepy Slumber 2000", and has a bottle with milk in it. Since she never left her stroller, many of the other toys thought of Tessie as a real baby.
- Tremaine (voiced by Ari Rubin) is a toy truck designed by Donny. He is very dynamic and needed to stand still because he had to get his stripes repainted.
- Tug (voiced by Rodger Bumpass) is Donny's squirt toy that is shaped like a tugboat.
- Val (voiced by Jennifer Hale) is a heart shape stuffed toy given by Doc's parents for Valentine's Day. Lambie secretly felt very jealous of her during a Valentine's Day party at the clinic.
- Walter (voiced by Tom Kenny) and Gracie (voiced by Grey DeLisle) are two walkie talkies that are both of different genders. Once, Walter lost his antenna and Gracie was lost in the strawberry field.
- Wicked King (voiced by Jess Harnell) is usually incredibly rude to the toys, but he has a soft spot at times.
- Wildlife Will (voiced by Jeffrey Nicholas Brown) is an Australian explorer action figure who lost his legs after a run-in with a Chihuahua.
- Xyla (voiced by Tiffany Haddish) is a toy xylophone that looks like a ladybug and belongs to Alma. In the episode "One Note Wonder", one of her keys was loose because one of the screws was loose, and when the key fell into the sink when Stuffy accidentally knocked it off, Doc replaced it with a new key.
- Witch Hazel (voiced by Lara Jill Miller) is a witch.
- Farmer Mack (voiced by Tom Kenny) is a toy farmer who, in "Stuffy Gets His Scrubs", broke his ankle.
- Lieutenant Luna 2200 (voiced by Naturi Naughton) is an astronaut with a pet mechanical dog (Space Rover) Olivia 0–197–0 a.k.a. Liv
- Saltwater Serge (voiced by Bernardo De Paula) is a water toy who once belonged to Doc's dad in his childhood. He and his whale, Wellington, wouldn't work because their button is worn out after being used a lot by Doc's dad when he was young, so Doc fixed the button.
- Nikki Nickel (voiced by Hynden Walch) is a toy piggy bank.
- Squibbles (voiced by Dee Bradley Baker) is Stuffy's toy pet critter.
- Fetchin' Findo (voiced by Dee Bradley Baker) is a robotic puppy. He couldn't fetch his toy bone because he had sand in his electronic nose, so Doc decided to open a new veterinarian branch to her clinic to take care of toy pets and cleaned the sand out of Findo's nose.
- Oliver (voiced by Dee Bradley Baker) is Hallie's toy pet dog.
- Whispers (voiced by Frank Welker) is Lambie's toy pet kitten.
- Admiral Fiddlesticks (voiced by Robert Bathurst)
- Creepy Cuddly Charlie Monster (voiced by Tom Kenny) is a stuffed three-eyed monster who is not scary, but very friendly.
- Princess Persephone (also known as "Peri") (voiced by Geena Davis) is an independent, athletic, and resourceful princess doll who can take care of herself.
- Count Clarence the Magnificent (voiced by Patton Oswalt) is a cardboard toy bat who is very grumpy. After getting caught in a gust of wind and crashing into the wading pool at the park, Doc uses Donny's kite to dry off Count Clarence and get him back to normal, and also with a more positive attitude.
- Army Al (voiced by Rodger Bumpass) is a toy soldier.
- Theodore (also known as Theo) (voiced by David Kaufman) is a wind-up toy sea turtle.
- Rockstar Ruby (voiced by Erin Cottrell) is a used Rock Star doll that belongs to Doc. Doc purchased her from a yard sale. In the episode "Rockstar Ruby and the Toys", her microphone button got stuck because dirt and gunk built up over time she was used. But Doc and the crew have a plan to bring back Rockstar Ruby back on stage.
- Kiara (voiced by Kath Soucie) is a Kaleidoscope.
- Tiny Tessie (voiced by Katie Leigh) is a toy doll who after losing a relay race, discovers that she needs to get out of her Sleepy Slumber 2000 Stroller to be active and have more fun.
- Coach Kay (voiced by Dot-Marie Jones) is a small plastic doll in a football/soccer kit.
- Tony (voiced by Chris Coppola) is a toy taxi cab driver.
- Viewy Stewie (voiced by Wayne Knight) is a Viewmaster toy who can view images.
- Pop Up Paulo (voiced by Arturo Del Puerto) is a Spanish-accented pop-up toy frog. He got his spring twisted while he was trying to get attention from Doc and the other toys.
- Pip (voiced by Lesley Nicol)
- Bernard (voiced by Matt Milne)
- Doodle Doo (voiced by Nigel Harman)
- Get-Well Gus (voiced by Ludacris) is a flying pegasus toy. When he crashed and breaks off one of his wings, Doc outfits him with a prosthetic.
- Gillian the Giant (voiced by Maeve Higgins) is an Irish Giantess doll based on a series of storybooks.
- Lala (voiced by Cristina Milizia) is a baby toy koala.
- Dixie (voiced by Kat Feller) is a plush pixie or a fairy doll and is one of the McStuffins nursery toys.
- Pandora (voiced by Ashley Edner) is one of the McStuffins nursery toys. He is a panda and is manly white with some ears, eyes, and cute little arms and legs.
- Snuggs (voiced by Deedee Magno Hall) is Maya's stuffed toy hedgehog.
- Stella (voiced by Ashley Nicole Selich) is a bike racer toy that belongs to Doc.
- Joni (voiced by Kelly Stables) is a pony. In the episode "Joni the Pony", Joni trips over her mane and the other toys suggest a haircut.
- Winnie (voiced by Jaime Pressly) is a toy tiger who is used to blow up balloons.
- Tavia (voiced by Hynden Walch) is a toy otter that belongs to Lisa.
- Sadie (voiced by Michelle Campbell) is a toy parrot that belongs to Emmie.
- The Twirly Twins: Jaz and Chaz (voiced by Chantelle Barry and Scott Whyte)
- Molly Molly (voiced by Cristine Lakin) is Doc's toy who loves to have flapjacks flipped into her mouth. When she keeps talking while eating, one of her plastic flapjacks gets stuck in her mouth, so Doc and the crew teach Molly Molly how to eat carefully and not to talk with her mouth full.
- Flora (voiced by Damienne Merlina) is a Flamenco dancing doll that Doc received as a gift from her grandmother who was visiting Spain.
- Itty Bitty Bess (voiced by Audra McDonald) is an antique tintype airplane pilot which Doc's mom got from a flea market/swap meet. She and her airplane, Qweenie, once had trouble flying due to rust. Doc used oil to get rid of the rust, and now Itty Bitty Bess can go back to flying in the Wild Blue Yonder.
- Queenie is an airplane that belongs to Itty Bitty Bess.
- Dress-Up Declan (voiced by Taye Diggs) is a fashion doll that belongs to Emmie.
- Dmitri (voiced by David Copperfield) is a doll who is Donny's magician partner.
- Fiona (voiced by Amy Pemberton) is an Irish paper doll from St. Patrick's Day.
- Stanley (voiced by Anthony Anderson) is a toy lion with parts of a toy rabbit who planned on taking over McStuffinsville.
- Twiggly (voiced by Debi Derryberry) is a tiny toy squirrel.
- Camille (voiced by Dede Drake) is a toy camel.
- Mia (voiced by Paris Hilton) is a toy cockatiel.
- Missy (voiced by Ellen Pompeo) is a toy cat that belongs to Alma.
- Katie (voiced by Mary Faber) is a singing toy doll. She once had to recharge her battery before a performance.
- Darla (voiced by Molly Ringwald in her first four appearances and Kari Wahlgren in her fifth appearance) is a toy fox who helps in emergencies at the toy hospital.
- Riley Rhino (voiced by Leslie Grossman) is a toy Rhinoceros who works at the toy hospital.
- Rodriguez Foosball (voiced by Jess Harnell) is one of Johnny Foosball's teammates.
- Ashton (voiced by Dylan O'Brien) is a toy air force ranger.
- Logan (voiced by Kailey Snider) is an ice cream truck who is the cousin of Rosie the Rescuer and who is a part of the McStuffinsville Pet Rescue Team.
- Queen Amena (Amina) (also known as Sparkly Queen of the World) (voiced by Lucinda Clare) is a monarch Doc receives from her cousin Tisha. Some of the other toys, including The Wicked King, once considered her "bossy", but Doc objects to that label.
- Bozini the Foosball Goaltender (voiced by Jess Harnell)
- Oooey Gablooey (voiced by Mitchell Whitfield) is a toy star that Donny won at a school fair at Doc's school. Oooey is filled with goo which allows him to stick onto anything, and he also has sticky, stretchy limbs he uses to perform stunts.
- Tracy (voiced by Yvette Nicole Brown) is a triceratops train.
- Chuck (voiced by David Shatraw) is a toy chicken who wears a vest, wings, and feet.
- Jacqueline (voiced by Simon Cowell) is a rubber duck wearing a cape.
- Tarantu-Lon (voiced by Rick Wasserman) is a toy robot space spider.
- Hilary (voiced by Gabourey Sidibe) is a toy mole.
- Hannah (voiced by Terra Deva) is a toy doll. She got gum stuck in her hair, so Doc got it out by cutting off her hair.
- Quackson (voiced by Mary Faber) is a toy duck.
- Rocky (voiced by Jessie Gold) is a toy porcupine.
- Nanny (voiced by Kaitlyn Robrock) is a lost toy goat that sews.
- Scarlett (voiced by Kari Wahlgren) is a toy eskimo.

==== The Logger of Lemurs Troupe ====
A group of lemurs who are known for their amazing skills.

- Wyatt (voiced by Derek Phillips) is a yellow male lemur who is the leader of the troupe. He discovers that he is missing an arm and decided to quit the team. Later, Doc researches that he was actually intentionally built this way at the factory.
- Trixie (voiced by Laraine Newman)
- Butch (voiced by Gary Anthony Williams)
- Calamity (voiced by Jamie Lewis)
- Otis (voiced by Jeffrey Nicholas Brown)
- Tumbleweed (voiced by Jeffrey Nicholas Brown)
- Maybelle (voiced by Lara Jill Miller)
- Cheyenne (voiced by Jamie Lewis)
- Yul (voiced by Michael Gough)
- Boots (voiced by TBA)

==== The First Responders Team ====
- Shinji (voiced by Parry Shen) is a toy firefighter who is part of the McStuffinsville's First Responders.
- Zoe (voiced by Debi Derryberry) is a toy who is part of the McStuffinsville's First Responders.
- Jacks (voiced by Will Callyer) is a toy who is part of the McStuffinsville's First Responders.
- Riggles (voiced by Alex Cazares) is a toy Tyrannosaurus rex who is part of the McStuffinsville's First Responders.
- Nosh (voiced by Michael-Leon Wooley) is a toy crocodile who is part of the McStuffinsville's First Responders.
- Iggy (voiced by Laraine Newman) is a toy cat who is part of the McStuffinsville's First Responders.

=== Guest stars ===
- Winnie the Pooh (voiced by Jim Cummings)
- Tigger (also voiced by Jim Cummings)
- Piglet (voiced by Travis Oates)
- Eeyore (voiced by Peter Cullen). The episode "Into the Hundred Acre Wood!" marks the final time Cullen would voice Eeyore in any Disney media prior to his death on August 26, 2026.
- Christopher Robin (voiced by Oliver Bell)
- Michelle Obama (voiced by herself)
- Audrey's mother (voiced by Robin Roberts)

== Broadcast history ==
In the United States, Doc McStuffins first premiered on March 23, 2012, on Disney-ABC networks Disney Channel and Disney Junior. On June 5, 2012, Disney Junior renewed the series for a second season, which premiered on September 6, 2013. On January 8, 2014, the series was renewed for a third season which premiered on July 11, 2015, but when the voice of Doc was changed in July 2015, the episodes formerly in the third season with the former voice of Doc were transferred over to season 2. On April 14, 2015, the series was renewed for a fourth season by Disney Junior, which premiered on July 29, 2016. It is titled "Doc McStuffins: Toy Hospital". On November 16, 2016, the series was renewed for a fifth season by Disney Junior, which premiered on October 26, 2018 with its first episode titled "The Pet Rescue Team".

In Canada, the show premiered on its Disney Junior variant channel on April 8, 2012. The show also aired globally on Disney Junior in multiple languages.

== DVD releases ==
Home media is distributed by Walt Disney Studios Home Entertainment.

Collection	Included episodes	Release date
Friendship is the Best Medicine	"Engine Nine, Feelin' Fine!" and "The Right Stuff", "Caught Blue-Handed" and "To Squeak, or Not to Squeak", "Ben/Anna Split!" and "That's Just Claw-ful", "The Rip Heard Round the World" and "Walkie-Talkie Time", "Dark Knight" and "Hallie Gets an Earful"	August 21, 2012
Time for Your Check Up	"Gulpy, Gulpy Gators!" and "One Note Wonder", "Tea Party Tantrum" and "Blast Off!", "Arcade Escapade" and "Starry, Starry Night", "Bronto Boo-Boos" and "Brontosaurus Breath", "Doctoring the Doc" and "Hot Pursuit"	May 7, 2013
Mobile Clinic	"Doc McStuffins Goes McMobile" and "Chip Off the Ol' Box", "Doc to the Rescue" and "Don't Knock the Noggin", "Out of the Box" and "Run Down Race Car", "Rescue Ronda, Ready for Takeoff" and "All Washed Up", "Rest Your Rotors, Ronda!" and "Keep On Truckin'"	March 18, 2014
School of Medicine	"Chilly Gets Chilly" and "Through the Reading Glasses", "Hallie's Happy Birthday" and "Shark-Style Toothache", "Think Pink" and "You Foose, You Lose", "Disco Dress Up Daisy" and "The Glider Brothers", "Celestial Celeste" and "Run Doc Run!"	September 9, 2014
Cuddle Me Lambie	"My Huggy Valentine" and "Dusty Bear", "Awesome Guy's Awesome Arm" and "Lamb in a Jam", "Kirby and the King" and "Bubble Monkey, Blow Your Nose!", "A Day Without Cuddles" and "Collide-o-scope", "Mirror, Mirror on My Penguin" and "Hide and Eek!"	February 3, 2015
Pet Vet	"Fetchin' Findo" and "Twin Tweaks", "Three Goats A'Cuddlin'" and "Swimmer's Belly", "A Dragon's Best Friend", "Stuffy & Squibbles" and "Queen of Thrones", "Take Your Pet to the Vet" and "Master and Commander"	November 3, 2015
Toy Hospital	"Welcome to McStuffinsville", "Baby McStuffins" and "Selfless Snowman", "Runaway Love" and "Tour De McStuffins", "Bringing Home Baby", "Baby Names" and "Night Night, Lala"	October 18, 2016

== Reception ==
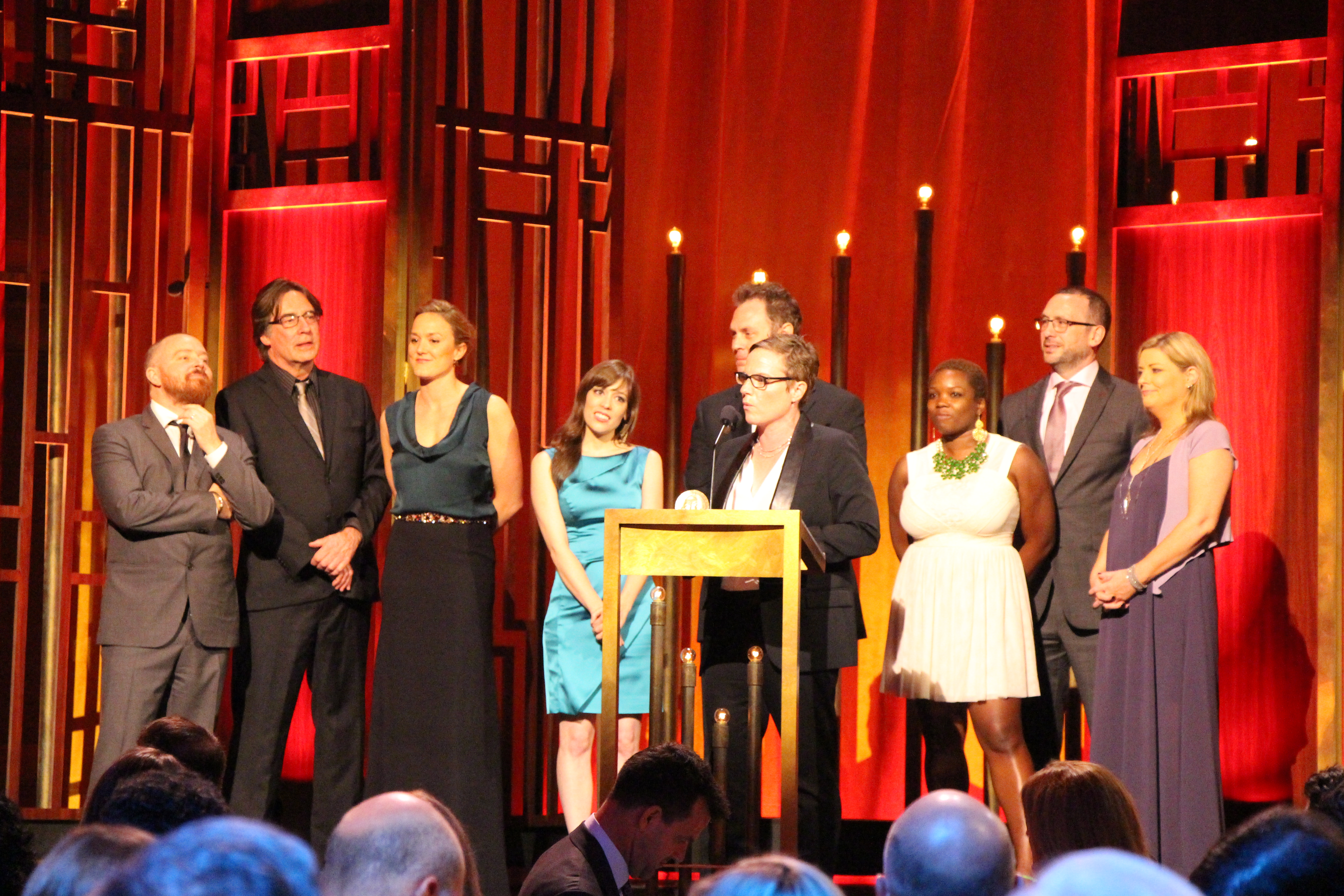
Creator and Executive Producer Chris Nee accepts the Peabody for "Doc McStuffins" along with key Brown Bag Films executives including Norton Virgien, Theresa Mayer, Chelsea Beyl, Kent Redeker, Kerri Grant, Gillian Higgins and founders Cathal Gaffney, and Darragh O'Connell.

The series received positive reviews and criticisms after its release. Kia Morgan Smith of Cincomom.com said that "It truly warmed my heart and almost brought tears to my eyes when my 8-year-old, Mikaela, saw 'Doc McStuffins' for the first time and said, 'Wow, mommy—she's brown,'" Dr. Myiesha Taylor founding president of Artemis Medical Society said that "This program featuring a little African-American girl and her family is crucial to changing the future of this nation." Taylor also applauded the concept of its portrayal of a young black girl who wishes to follow in the footsteps of her mother as a doctor as the lead character, that inspired her to collect pictures of 131 doctors—all women of color—and publish a collage online under the heading, 'We Are Doc McStuffins.'"

The program was also a ratings hit on Disney Junior, with its premiere attracting 1.08 million children ages 2 and up and an average of 918,000 viewers in the same demographic, leading AdWeek magazine to dub the show an "improbable ratings juggernaut".

In 2013, $500 million worth of Doc McStuffins merchandise was sold, something The New York Times writers claimed industry experts said "seems to be setting a record" for a "toy line based on an African-American character". They also said the character had broad appeal and the toys sold well to all demographics.

In 2016, news that Disney had yet to formally renew the program for a fifth season resulted in a number of celebrities, including W. Kamau Bell, Jamilah Lemieux and Audra McDonald to appeal Disney to continue the program. Chris Nee, the show's creator, tweeted that she would report immediately if she received any news of the show being picked up, commenting that the writing staff was eager to continue with new stories.

=== Episode featuring an interracial lesbian couple ===
On August 5, 2017, season 4 Episode 22a, "The Emergency Plan", featured Thea and Edie, an interracial lesbian married couple, making Doc McStuffins the first Disney Junior preschool series and Disney's first TV series to include a same-sex couple. The characters were voiced by real-life lesbian actresses Wanda Sykes (Thea) and Portia de Rossi (Edie). LGBT rights organization GLAAD expressed its support and lauded Disney for the inclusion of the characters. By contrast, it was protested by the One Million Moms division of American Family Association.

=== Awards and nominations ===
Awards
Year	Award	Category	Recipients and nominees	Result	Ref.
2013	British Academy Children's Awards	International	Doc McStuffins	Nominated	
2014	British Academy Children's Awards	International	Norton Virgien, Theresa Mayer, Chris Nee	Nominated	
2018	British Academy Children's Awards	International Pre-School	Chris Nee, Norton Virgien, Colm Tyrrell	Nominated	
2019	British Academy Children's Awards	International Animation	Dan Nosella, Michael Stern, Chris Nee	Nominated	
2019	Daytime Emmy Award	Outstanding Writing for a Preschool Animated Program		Nominated	
2020	Daytime Emmy Award	Outstanding Preschool Children's Animated Series		Nominated	
2018	GLAAD Award	Outstanding Kids & Family Programming	Emergency Family Plan	Nominated	
2016	Kidscreen Awards	Best Animated Series	Tied with Sarah & Duck (Family Jr.)	Won	
2015	NAACP Image Award	Outstanding Children's Program	Doc McStuffins	Won	
2021	NAACP Image Award	Outstanding Animated Series	Doc McStuffins	Won	
2021	NAACP Image Award	Outstanding Character Voice-Over Performance (Television)	Laya DeLeon Hayes	Won	
2014	Peabody Award	Peabody Award	Doc McStuffins	Won	

== Video game adaptations ==
Doc McStuffins Pet Vet was released on iOS and Android.

=== Feel Good Games ===
There are a variety of games specifically focused on the series, including:

1. Big Air Adventure a five-series crossover of title characters from Henry Hugglemonster, Jake and the Never Land Pirates, Miles from Tomorrowland, and Sofia the First
2. Doc McStuffins Sticker Book
3. Doc Me
4. Doc's Seek and Find
5. Doc's Snowman Rollup
6. Doc's Summertime Clinic
7. Frost Magic
8. Sparkly Ball Sports
9. Stuffy's Scramble
10. The Doc Mobile

== Effects ==
In response to Doc McStuffins, an organization for medical doctors who are also women of color called the Artemis Medical Society was created on June 28, 2012.
