= 56th NAACP Image Awards =

American entertainment awards for 2024

- Date: February 22, 2025
- Site: Pasadena Civic Auditorium, Pasadena, California
- Hosted by: Deon Cole
- Official website: NAACPImageAwards.net

Highlights
- Best Picture: The Six Triple Eight
- Best Drama Series: Cross
- Best Musical or Comedy Series: Abbott Elementary
- Most nominations: The Piano Lesson: 14 Nominations

Television coverage
- Network: BET; CBS; BET Her; MTV; MTV2; CMT; Comedy Central; Logo TV; Paramount Network; Smithsonian Channel; TV Land; VH1 (simulcast)

The 56th NAACP Image Awards, presented by the NAACP, honored outstanding representations and achievements of people of color in motion pictures, television, music, and literature during the 2024 calendar year. The ceremony aired on February 22, 2025, on BET and simulcasted on CBS. Untelevised Image Awards categories were livestreamed February 21 on the Image Awards website.

Submissions were received online from August 26 to November 8, 2024, and public online voting on the shortlisted nominations for performance categories ran from January 7 to February 7, 2025, on the Image Awards website.

== Winners and nominees ==
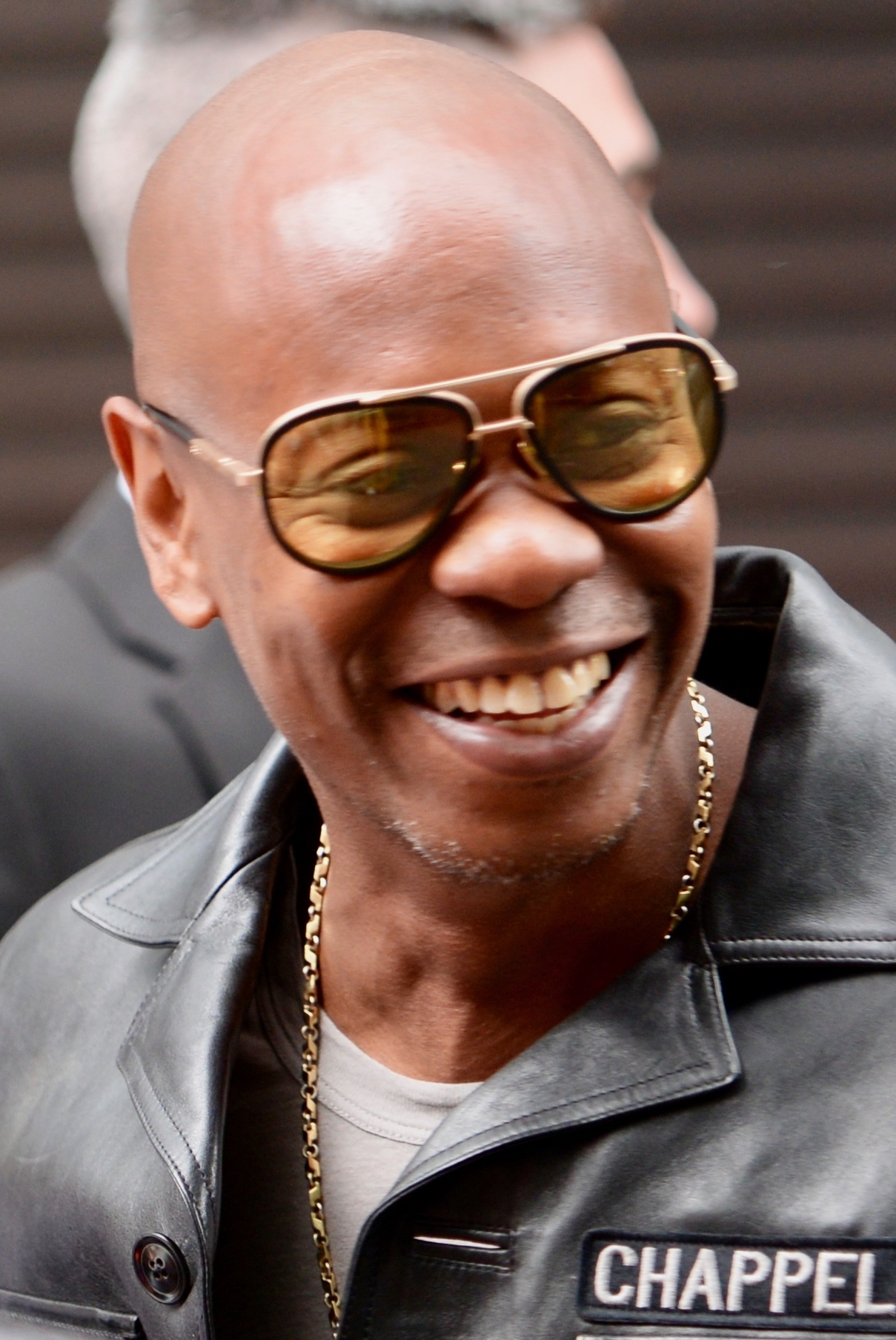
Dave Chappelle was honored with the President's Award.

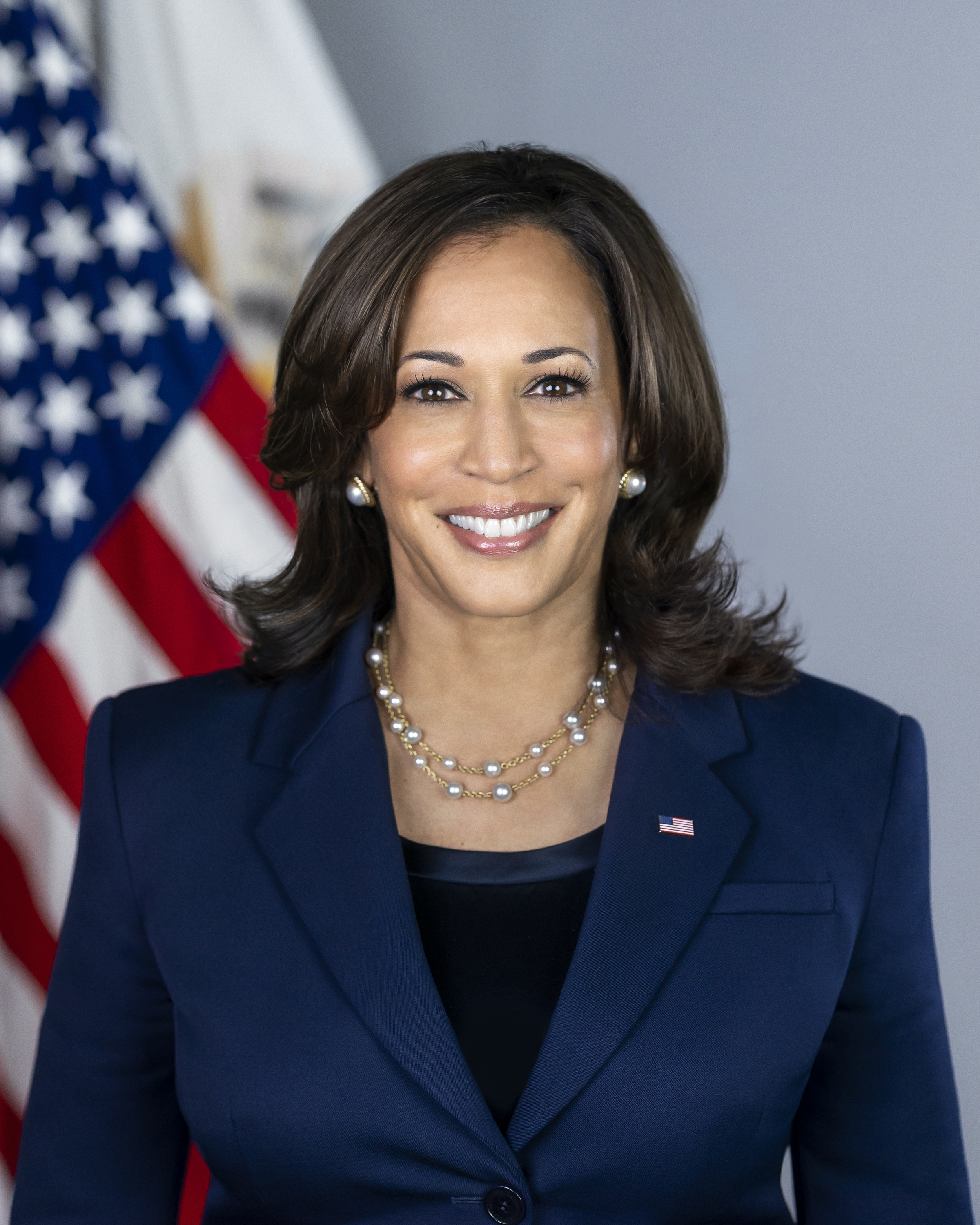
Kamala Harris was honored with the Chairman's Award.

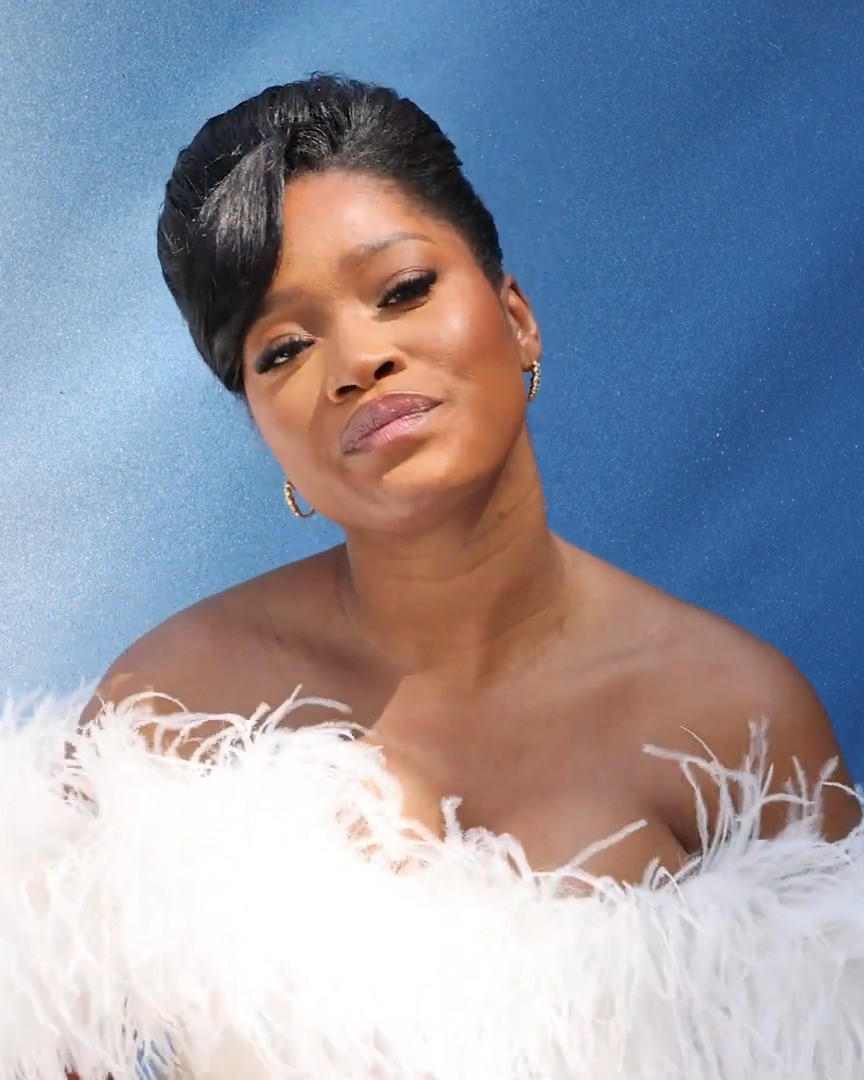
Keke Palmer received the award for Entertainer of the Year.

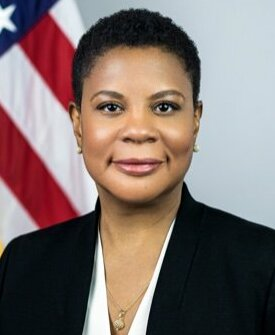
Alondra Nelson received the Digital Civil Rights Award.

All nominees are listed below, and the winners are listed in bold.

=== Special awards ===
President's Award
- **Dave Chappelle**
Chairman's Award
- **Kamala Harris**
Founder's Award
- **BET**
Hall of Fame Award
- **Wayans family**
Vanguard Award
- **Essence Communications Inc.**
Entertainer of the Year
- **Keke Palmer**
  - Cynthia Erivo
  - Kendrick Lamar
  - Kevin Hart
  - Shannon Sharpe
The Mildred Bond Roxborough Social Justice Impact Award
- **Jotaka Eaddy**
NAACP-Archewell Digital Civil Rights Award
- **Alondra Nelson**

=== Motion Picture ===
Outstanding Motion Picture	Outstanding Directing in a Motion Picture
**The Six Triple Eight**; Bad Boys: Ride or Die; Bob Marley: One Love; The Piano Lesson; Wicked	**RaMell Ross — Nickel Boys**; Jeymes Samuel — The Book of Clarence; Malcolm Washington — The Piano Lesson; Reinaldo Marcus Green — Bob Marley: One Love; Steve McQueen — Blitz
Outstanding Actor in a Motion Picture	Outstanding Actress in a Motion Picture
**Martin Lawrence — Bad Boys: Ride or Die**; André Holland — Exhibiting Forgiveness; Colman Domingo — Sing Sing; John David Washington — The Piano Lesson; Kingsley Ben-Adir — Bob Marley: One Love	**Kerry Washington — The Six Triple Eight**; Cynthia Erivo — Wicked; Lashana Lynch — Bob Marley: One Love; Lupita Nyong'o — A Quiet Place: Day One; Regina King — Shirley
Outstanding Supporting Actor in a Motion Picture	Outstanding Supporting Actress in a Motion Picture
**Denzel Washington — Gladiator II**; Brian Tyree Henry — The Fire Inside; Corey Hawkins — The Piano Lesson; David Alan Grier — The American Society of Magical Negroes; Samuel L. Jackson — The Piano Lesson	**Ebony Obsidian — The Six Triple Eight**; Aunjanue Ellis-Taylor — Exhibiting Forgiveness; Aunjanue Ellis-Taylor — Nickel Boys; Danielle Deadwyler — The Piano Lesson; Lynn Whitfield — Albany Road
Outstanding International Motion Picture	Outstanding Independent Motion Picture
**Emilia Pérez**; El lugar de la otra; Memoir of a Snail; The Seed of the Sacred Fig; The Wall Street Boy (Kipkemboi)	**Sing Sing**; Albany Road; Exhibiting Forgiveness; Rob Peace; We Grown Now
Outstanding Breakthrough Performance in a Motion Picture	Outstanding Ensemble Cast in a Motion Picture
**Ebony Obsidian — The Six Triple Eight**; Brandon Wilson — Nickel Boys; Clarence Maclin — Sing Sing; Danielle Deadwyler — The Piano Lesson; Ryan Destiny — The Fire Inside	**The Six Triple Eight**; Bob Marley: One Love; The Book of Clarence; The Piano Lesson; Wicked
Outstanding Animated Motion Picture	Outstanding Character Voice Performance – Motion Picture
**Inside Out 2**; Kung Fu Panda 4; Moana 2; Piece by Piece; The Wild Robot	**Blue Ivy Carter — Mufasa: The Lion King**; Aaron Pierre — Mufasa: The Lion King; Anika Noni Rose — Mufasa: The Lion King; Ayo Edebiri— Inside Out 2; Lupita Nyong'o — The Wild Robot
Outstanding Short Form (Live Action)	Outstanding Short Form (Animated)
**Superman Doesn't Steal**; Chocolate with Sprinkles; Definitely Not a Monster; If They Took Us Back; My Brother & Me	**Peanut Headz: Black History Toonz “Jackie Robinson”**; if(fy); Nate & John; Self; Walk in the Light
Outstanding Breakthrough Creative (Motion Picture)	Outstanding Writing in a Motion Picture
**Malcolm Washington — The Piano Lesson**; David Fortune — Color Book; RaMell Ross — Nickel Boys; Titus Kaphar — Exhibiting Forgiveness; Zoë Kravitz — Blink Twice	**RaMell Ross, Joslyn Barnes — Nickel Boys**; Barry Jenkins — The Fire Inside; Steve McQueen — Blitz; Titus Kaphar — Exhibiting Forgiveness; Virgil Williams, Malcolm Washington — The Piano Lesson
Outstanding Youth Performance in a Motion Picture	Outstanding Cinematography in a Feature Film
**Skylar Aleece Smith — The Piano Lesson**; Anthony B. Jenkins — The Deliverance; Blake Cameron James — We Grown Now; Percy Daggs IV — Never Let Go; Jeremiah Daniels — Color Book	**Jomo Fray — Nickel Boys**; Andrés Arochi — Longlegs; Justin Derry — She Taught Love; Lachlan Milne — Exhibiting Forgiveness; Rob Hardy — The Book of Clarence

=== Documentary ===
Outstanding Documentary (Motion Picture)	Outstanding Directing in a Documentary (Television or Motion Picture)
**Luther: Never Too Much**; Daughters; Frida; King of Kings: Chasing Edward Jones; The Greatest Night in Pop	**Dawn Porter — Luther: Never Too Much**; Bao Nguyen — The Greatest Night in Pop; Deborah Riley Draper — James Brown: Say It Loud; Jason Pollard and Sam Pollard — Ol’ Dirty Bastard: A Tale of Two Dirtys; Nneka Onuorah — Megan Thee Stallion: In Her Words
Outstanding Documentary (Television)	Outstanding Short Form Documentary
**Black Barbie: A Documentary**; Black Twitter: A People's History; Gospel; Simone Biles Rising; Sprint	**How to Sue the Klan**; Camille A. Brown: Giant Steps; Danielle Scott: Ancestral Call; Judging Juries; Silent Killer

=== Television ===
==== Drama ====
Outstanding Drama Series
**Cross**; 9-1-1; Bel-Air; Found; Reasonable Doubt
Outstanding Actor in a Drama Series	Outstanding Actress in a Drama Series
**Michael Rainey Jr. — Power Book II: Ghost**; Aldis Hodge — Cross; Donald Glover — Mr. & Mrs. Smith; Harold Perrineau — FROM; Jabari Banks — Bel-Air	**Queen Latifah — The Equalizer**; Angela Bassett — 9-1-1; Emayatzy Corinealdi — Reasonable Doubt; Shanola Hampton — Found; Zoe Saldaña — Lioness
Outstanding Supporting Actor in a Drama Series	Outstanding Supporting Actress in a Drama Series
**Cliff “Method Man” Smith — Power Book II: Ghost**; Adrian Holmes — Bel–Air; Isaiah Mustafa — Cross; Jacob Latimore — The Chi; Morris Chestnut — Reasonable Doubt	**Lynn Whitfield — The Chi**; Adjoa Andoh — Bridgerton; Coco Jones — Bel-Air; Golda Rosheuvel — Bridgerton; Lorraine Toussaint — The Equalizer
Outstanding Directing in a Drama Series	Outstanding Writing in a Dramatic Series
**Rapman — Supacell**; Carl Franklin — Monsters: The Lyle and Erik Menendez Story; Marta Cunningham — Genius: MLK/X; Marta Cunningham — Genius: MLK/X; Paris Barclay — Monsters: The Lyle and Erik Menendez Story	**Ben Watkins — Cross**; Azia Squire — Bridgerton; Francesca Sloane, Donald Glover — Mr. & Mrs. Smith; Geetika Lizardi — Bridgerton; Lauren Gamble — Bridgerton

==== Comedy ====
Outstanding Comedy Series
**Abbott Elementary**; How to Die Alone; Poppa's House; The Neighborhood; The Upshaws
Outstanding Actor in a Comedy Series	Outstanding Actress in a Comedy Series
**Damon Wayans — Poppa's House**; Cedric The Entertainer — The Neighborhood; David Alan Grier — St. Denis Medical; Delroy Lindo — UnPrisoned; Mike Epps — The Upshaws	**Quinta Brunson — Abbott Elementary**; Ayo Edebiri — The Bear; Kerry Washington — UnPrisoned; Natasha Rothwell — How to Die Alone; Tichina Arnold — The Neighborhood
Outstanding Supporting Actor in a Comedy Series	Outstanding Supporting Actress in a Comedy Series
**Damon Wayans Jr. — Poppa's House**; Giancarlo Esposito — The Gentlemen; Kenan Thompson — Saturday Night Live; Tyler James Williams — Abbott Elementary; William Stanford Davis — Abbott Elementary	**Danielle Pinnock — Ghosts**; Ego Nwodim — Saturday Night Live; Janelle James — Abbott Elementary; Sheryl Lee Ralph — Abbott Elementary; Wanda Sykes — The Upshaws
Outstanding Directing in a Comedy Series	Outstanding Writing in a Comedy Series
**Tiffany Johnson — How to Die Alone**; Ayo Edebiri — The Bear; Bentley Kyle Evans — Mind Your Business; Robbie Countryman — The Upshaws; William Smith — The Vince Staples Show	**Crystal Jenkins — No Good Deed**; Ashley Nicole Black — Shrinking; Brittani Nichols — Abbott Elementary; Diarra Kilpatrick — Diarra From Detroit; Jordan Temple — Abbott Elementary

==== Television Movie, Limited-Series or Dramatic Special ====
Outstanding Television Movie, Mini-Series or Special
**Fight Night: The Million Dollar Heist**; Genius: MLK/X; Griselda; Rebel Ridge; The Madness
Outstanding Actor in a Television Movie, Mini-Series or Special	Outstanding Actress in a Television Movie, Mini-Series or Special
**Aaron Pierre — Rebel Ridge**; Colman Domingo — The Madness; Kelvin Harrison Jr. — Genius: MLK/X; Kevin Hart — Fight Night: The Million Dollar Heist; Laurence Fishburne — Clipped	**Naturi Naughton — Abducted at an HBCU: A Black Girl Missing Movie**; Aunjanue Ellis-Taylor — The Supremes at Earl's All-You-Can-Eat; Sanaa Lathan — The Supremes at Earl's All-You-Can-Eat; Sofía Vergara — Griselda; Uzo Aduba — The Supremes at Earl's All-You-Can-Eat
Outstanding Supporting Actor in a Television Movie, Limited-Series or Special	Outstanding Supporting Actress in a Television Movie, Limited-Series or Special
**Samuel L. Jackson — Fight Night: The Million Dollar Heist**; Don Cheadle — Fight Night: The Million Dollar Heist; Luke James — Them: The Scare; Ron Cephas Jones — Genius: MLK/X; Terrence Howard — Fight Night: The Million Dollar Heist	**Taraji P. Henson — Fight Night: The Million Dollar Heist**; Brandy Norwood — Descendants: The Rise of Red; Jayme Lawson — Genius: MLK/X; Loretta Devine — Terry McMillan Presents: Tempted By Love; Sanaa Lathan — Young. Wild. Free.
Outstanding Directing in a Television Movie, Documentary or Special	Outstanding Writing in a Television Movie, Documentary or Special
**Tina Mabry — The Supremes at Earl's All-You-Can Eat**; Kelley Kali — Kemba; Marcelo Gama — BET Awards 2024; Shanta Fripp — Black Men's Summit; Thembi L. Banks — Young. Wild. Free	**Juel Taylor, Tony Rettenmaier, Thembi L. Banks — Young. Wild. Free.**; Brandon Espy, Carl Reid — Mr. Crocket; Bree West, Chazitear — A Wesley South African Christmas; Rudy Mancuso, Dan Lagana — Música; Tina Mabry, Gina Prince-Bythewood, Cee Marcellus — The Supremes at Earl's All-You-Can-Eat

==== Overall Acting ====
Outstanding Character Voice-Over Performance (Television)	Outstanding Guest Performance
**Cree Summer — Rugrats**; Angela Bassett — Orion and the Dark; Cree Summer — The Legend of Vox Machina; Dawnn Lewis — Star Trek: Lower Decks; Keke Palmer — The Second Best Hospital in the Galaxy	**Marlon Wayans — Bel-Air**; Ayo Edebiri— Saturday Night Live; Cree Summer — Abbott Elementary; Keegan-Michael Key — Abbott Elementary; Maya Rudolph — Saturday Night Live
Outstanding Performance by a Youth (Series, Special, Television Movie or Limited-series)
**Leah Sava Jeffries — Percy Jackson and the Olympians**; Caleb Elijah — Cross; Graceyn Hollingsworth — Gracie's Corner; Melody Hurd — Cross; TJ Mixson — The Madness

==== Reality and Variety ====
Outstanding Talk Series	Outstanding Reality Program, Reality Competition Series or Game Show
**The Jennifer Hudson Show**; Hart to Heart; Sherri; Tamron Hall; The Shop (Season 7)	**Celebrity Family Feud**; Password; Rhythm + Flow; The Real Housewives of Potomac; Tia Mowry: My Next Act
Outstanding News / Information – (Series or Special)	Outstanding Host in a Talk or News / Information (Series or Special)
**The Reidout**; Black Men's Summit; Finding Your Roots with Henry Louis Gates, Jr.; Laura Coates Live; NewsNight with Abby Phillip}	**Jennifer Hudson – The Jennifer Hudson Show**; Abby Phillip – NewsNight with Abby Phillip; Henry Louis Gates, Jr. – Finding Your Roots with Henry Louis Gates, Jr.; Joy Reid – The Reidout; Sherri Shepherd – Sherri
Outstanding Variety Show (Series or Special)	Outstanding Host in a Reality, Game Show or Variety (Series or Special)
**Jamie Foxx: What Had Happened Was...**; BET Awards 2024; Deon Cole: Ok, Mister; Katt Williams: Woke Foke; Saturday Night Live	**Keke Palmer – Password**; Alfonso Ribeiro – Dancing with the Stars; Nick Cannon – The Masked Singer; Steve Harvey – Celebrity Family Feud; Taraji P. Henson – BET Awards 2024

==== Other Categories ====
Outstanding Short-Form Series or Special - Reality/Nonfiction/Documentary	Outstanding Animated Series
**The Prince of Death Row Records**; In the Margins; NCAA Basketball on CBS Sports; Roots of Resistance; SC Featured	**Gracie's Corner**; Ariel; Everybody Still Hates Chris; Iwájú; Moon Girl and Devil Dinosaur
Outstanding Children's Program	Outstanding Breakthrough Creative (Television)
**Gracie's Corner**; Craig of the Creek; Descendants: The Rise of Red; Sesame Street; Snoopy Presents: Welcome Home, Franklin	**Ayo Edebiri — The Bear**; Diarra Kilpatrick — Diarra from Detroit; Maurice Williams — The Madness; Thembi L. Banks — Young. Wild. Free.; Vince Staples — The Vince Staples Show

=== Costume Design, Make-up and Hairstyling ===
Outstanding Costume Design	Outstanding Make-up
**Paul Tazewell — Wicked**; Ernesto Martinez — Fight Night: The Million Dollar Heist; Megan Coates — Shirley; Gersha Phillips — The Big Cigar; Francine Jamison-Tanchuck — The Piano Lesson	**Debi Young — Shirley**; Carol Rasheed — Fight Night: The Million Dollar Heist; Rebecca Lee — Shōgun; Matiki Anoff — The Book of Clarence; Para Malden — The Piano Lesson
Outstanding Hairstyling
**Lawrence Davis — Fight Night: The Million Dollar Heist**; Terry Hunt — Bel-Air; Nakoya Yancey — Shirley; Brian Badie — The Penguin; Andrea Mona Bowman — The Piano Lesson

=== Stunt ===
Outstanding Stunt Ensemble (TV or Film)
- **Rebel Ridge**
  - Cross
  - Grotesquerie
  - Red One
  - Them: The Scare

=== Recording ===
Outstanding Album	Outstanding New Artist
**Cowboy Carter — Beyoncé**; Alligator Bites Never Heal — Doechii; Cape Town to Cairo — PJ Morton; Coming Home — Usher; Glorious — GloRilla	**Doechii**; Myles Smith; Samoht; Shaboozey; Tyla
Outstanding Male Artist	Outstanding Female Artist
**Chris Brown**; J. Cole; Kendrick Lamar; October London; Usher	**Beyoncé**; Coco Jones; Doechii; GloRilla; H.E.R.
Outstanding Duo, Group or Collaboration (Traditional)	Outstanding Duo, Group or Collaboration (Contemporary)
**"Summertime" — Adam Blackstone & Fantasia**; "Watcha Done Now" — Leela James feat. Kenyon Dixon; "God Problems (Not by Power)" — Maverick City Music feat. Miles Minnick; "Made for Me"— Muni Long & Mariah Carey; "Thankful" — Sounds of Blackness feat. Jamecia Bennett & Buddy McLain	**"Piece of My Heart" — Wizkid feat. Brent Faiyaz**; "In My Bag"— FLO & GloRilla; "Rain Down on Me" — GloRilla feat. Kirk Franklin, Maverick City Music, Kierra Sheard & Chandler Moore; "Coming Home" — Usher & Burna Boy; "SOS (Sex on Sight)" — Victoria Monét feat. Usher
Outstanding Soul/R&B Song	Outstanding Hip Hop/Rap Song
**"Residuals" — Chris Brown**; "16 Carriages" — Beyoncé; "Here We Go (Uh Oh)" — Coco Jones; "I Found You" — PJ Morton; "Saturn" — SZA	**"Not Like Us" — Kendrick Lamar**; "Mamushi" — Megan Thee Stallion feat. Yuki Chiba; "Murdergram Deux" — LL Cool J feat. Eminem; "Noid" — Tyler, the Creator; "Yeah Glo!" — GloRilla
Outstanding International Song	Outstanding Music Video/Visual Album
**"Hmmm" — Chris Brown feat. Davido**; "Close" — Skip Marley; "Jump" — Tyla; "Love Me JeJe” — Tems; "Piece of My Heart" — Wizkid feat. Brent Faiyaz	**"Not Like Us" — Kendrick Lamar**; "Alright" — Victoria Monét; "Alter Ego (ALTERnate Version)" — Doechii, JT; "Boy Bye" — Chloe Bailey; "Yeah Glo!" — GloRilla
Outstanding Original Score for TV/Film	Outstanding Soundtrack/Compilation Album
**Star Wars: The Acolyte (Original Soundtrack)**; Challengers (Original Score); Dune: Part Two (Original Motion Picture Soundtrack); The American Society of Magical Negroes (Original Motion Picture Soundtrack); The Book of Clarence (Original Motion Picture Score)	**Wicked: The Soundtrack**; Bob Marley: One Love (Soundtrack); Genius: MLK/X (Songs from the Original Series); Reasonable Doubt (Season 2) (Original Soundtrack); The Book of Clarence (The Motion Picture Soundtrack)
Outstanding Gospel/Christian Album	Outstanding Gospel/Christian Song
**Live Breathe Fight — Tamela Mann**; Heart of a Human — DOE; Still Karen — Karen Clark Sheard; Sunny Days — Yolanda Adams; The Maverick Way Reimagined — Maverick City Music	**"Working for Me" — Tamela Mann**; "Church Doors" — Yolanda Adams; "Do It Anyway" — Tasha Cobbs Leonard; "God Problems (Not by Power)" — Maverick City Music feat. Miles Minnick; "I Prayed for You (Said a Prayer)" — Major.
Outstanding Jazz Album
**Portrait — Samara Joy**; Creole Orchestra — Etienne Charles; Epic Cool — Kirk Whalum; Javon & Nikki Go to the Movies — Javon Jackson and Nikki Giovanni; On Their Shoulders: An Organ Tribute — Matthew Whitaker

=== Podcast and Social Media ===
Outstanding News and Information Podcast	Outstanding Lifestyle/Self-Help Podcast
**Native Land Pod**; #SundayCivics; After the Uprising; Into America: Uncounted Millions; The Assignment with Audie Cornish	**We Don't Always Agree with Ryan & Sterling**; Balanced Black Girl; Is This Going to Cause An Argument; The R Spot with Iyanla; Therapy for Black Girls
Outstanding Society and Culture Podcast	Outstanding Arts, Sports and Entertainment Podcast
**Club Shay Shay**; Baby, This is Keke Palmer; Higher Learning with Van Lathan and Rachel Lindsay; We Don't Always Agree with Ryan & Sterling; What Now? with Trevor Noah	**Two Funny Mamas**; Naked Sports with Cari Champion; Nightcap; Questlove Supreme; R&B Money Podcast
Outstanding Podcast – Limited Series/Short Form	Social Media Personality of the Year
**Stranded**; About the Journey; Squeezed with Yvette Nicole Brown; The Wonder of Stevie; When We Win with Maya Rupert	**Shirley Raines**; Kai Cenat; Keith Lee; RaeShanda Lias; Tony Baker

=== Literary ===
Outstanding Literary Work – Fiction	Outstanding Literary Work – Nonfiction
**One of Us Knows: A Thriller — Alyssa Cole**; A Love Song for Ricki Wilde — Tia Williams; Grown Woman — Sarai Johnson; Neighbors and Other Stories — Diane Oliver, Tayari Jones; What You Leave Behind — Wanda M. Morris	**Love & Whiskey: The Remarkable True Story of Jack Daniel, His Master Distiller Nearest Green, and the Improbable Rise of Uncle Nearest — Fawn Weaver**; A Passionate Mind in Relentless Pursuit: The Vision of Mary McLeod Bethune — Noliwe Rooks; Picturing Black History: Photographs and Stories that Changed the World — Daniela Edmeier, Damarius Johnson, Nicholas B. Breyfogle and Steven Conn; The 1619 Project: A Visual Experience — Nikole Hannah-Jones and The New York Times Magazine; The Jazzmen: How Duke Ellington, Louis Armstrong, and Count Basie Transformed America — Larry Tye
Outstanding Literary Work – Debut Author	Outstanding Literary Work – Biography/Autobiography
**Grown Woman — Sarai Johnson**; A Kind of Madness — Uche Okonkwo; AfroCentric Style: A Celebration of Blackness & Identity in Pop Culture — Shirley Neal; Masquerade — O.O. Sangoyomi; Swift River — Essie Chambers	**Medgar and Myrlie: Medgar Evers and the Love Story That Awakened America — JoyAnn Reid**; Bits and Pieces: My Mother, My Brother, and Me — Whoopi Goldberg; By the Time You Read This: The Space Between Cheslie's Smile and Mental Illness ― Her Story in Her Own Words — Cheslie Kryst and April Simpkins; Do It Anyway: Don't Give Up Before It Gets Good — Tasha Cobbs Leonard, Sarah Jakes Roberts; Lovely One: A Memoir — Ketanji Brown Jackson
Outstanding Literary Work – Instructional	Outstanding Literary Work – Poetry
**Wash Day: Passing on the Legacy, Rituals, and Love of Natural Hair — Tomesha Faxio**; Black Joy Playbook: 30 Days of Intentionally Reclaiming Your Delight — Tracey Michae’l Lewis-Giggets; I Did a New Thing: 30 Days to Living Free (A Feeding the Soul Book) — Tabitha Brown; Loving Your Black Neighbor as Yourself: A Guide to Closing the Space Between Us — Chanté Griffin; Radical Self-Care: Rituals for Inner Resilience — Rebecca Moore and Amberlee Green	**This Is the Honey: An Anthology of Contemporary Black Poets — Kwame Alexander**; Bluff: Poems — Danez Smith; Good Dress — Brittany Rogers; Load in Nine Times: Poems — Frank X Walker; Song of My Softening — Omotara James
Outstanding Literary Work – Children	Outstanding Literary Work – Youth/Teens
**You Can Be a Good Friend (No Matter What!): A Lil TJ Book — Taraji P. Henson and Paul Kellam**; All I Need to Be — Rachel Ricketts, Tiffany Rose and Luana Horry; Cicely Tyson — Renée Watson and Sherry Shine; Crowning Glory: A Celebration of Black Hair — Carole Boston Weatherford and Ekua Holmes; My Hair Is a Book — Maisha Oso and London Ladd	**Brushed Between Cultures: A YA Coming of Age Novel Set in Brooklyn, New York — Samarra St. Hilaire**; American Wings: Chicago's Pioneering Black Aviators and the Race for Equality in the Sky — Sherri L. Smith and Elizabeth Wein; Barracoon Adapted for Young Readers The Story of the Last Black Cargo — Zora Neale Hurston, Jazzmen Lee-Johnson, Ibram X. Kendi (Adapted by); Black Star: The Door of No Return — Kwame Alexander; Clutch Time: A Shot Clock Novel (Shot Clock, 2) — Caron Butler and Justin A. Reynolds
Outstanding Graphic Novel
**Punk Rock Karaoke — Bianca Xunise**; Big Jim and the White Boy: An American Classic Reimagined — David F. Walker and Marcus Kwame Anderson; Black Defender: The Awakening — Dr. David Washington, Mr. Zhengis Tasbolatov and Mr. Billy Blanks; Gamerville — Johnnie Christmas; Ghost Roast — Shawneé Gibbs, Shawnelle Gibbs and Emily Cannon
