= NAACP Image Award for Outstanding Children's Program =

American television award

This article lists the winners and nominees for the NAACP Image Award for Outstanding Children's Program. First awarded in 1982, the category was quickly retired until 1995. Since its return, Teen Summit holds the record for most wins in this category with six.

Several animated series oriented toward children have been nominated and awarded in the category, even after the creation of the award for Outstanding Animated Series in 2021.

== Winners and nominees ==
Winners are listed first and highlighted in bold.

=== 1980s ===
| Year | Series | Ref |
|---|---|---|
1982
| 1982 | **ABC Afterschool Specials** | |
| 1983 – 89 | —N/a | |

=== 1990s ===
| Year | Series | Ref |
|---|---|---|
| 1990 – 94 | —N/a | |
1995
| 1995 | **Teen Summit** | |
| 1995 | My Brother and Me | |
1996
| 1996 | **Reading Rainbow** | |
| 1996 | Gullah, Gullah Island | |
| 1996 | Marsalis on Music | |
| 1996 | Sesame Street | |
| 1996 | Teen Summit | |
1997
| 1997 | **Teen Summit** | |
| 1997 | All That | |
| 1997 | Gullah, Gullah Island | |
| 1997 | Reading Rainbow | |
| 1997 | Where in the World is Carmen Sandiego? | |
1998
| 1998 | **Teen Summit** | |
| 1998 | Biography for Kids | |
| 1998 | Gullah, Gullah Island | |
| 1998 | Reading Rainbow | |
| 1998 | Sesame Street | |
1999
| 1999 | **Teen Summit** | |
| 1999 | All That | |
| 1999 | Kenan & Kel | |
| 1999 | Reading Rainbow | |
| 1999 | Sesame Street | |

=== 2000s ===
| Year | Series | Ref |
|---|---|---|
2000
| 2000 | **Teen Summit** | |
| 2000 | Cousin Skeeter | |
| 2000 | Gullah, Gullah Island | |
| 2000 | Showtime at the Apollo | |
| 2000 | Kenan & Kel | |
2001
| 2001 | **The Color of Friendship** | |
| 2001 | Cousin Skeeter | |
| 2001 | Little Bill | |
| 2001 | Reading Rainbow | |
| 2001 | Dear America: Color Me Dark | |
2002
| 2002 | **Teen Summit** | |
| 2002 | Little Bill | |
| 2002 | The Proud Family | |
| 2002 | Reading Rainbow | |
| 2002 | Sesame Street | |
| 2003 – 04 | —N/a | |
2005
| 2005 | **That's So Raven** | |
| 2005 | The Proud Family | |
| 2005 | Reading Rainbow | |
| 2006 | —N/a | |
2007
| 2007 | **That's So Raven** | |
| 2007 | The Backyardigans | |
| 2007 | Romeo! | |
| 2007 | Dora the Explorer | |
| 2007 | High School Musical | |
2008
| 2008 | **That's So Raven** | |
| 2008 | Go, Diego! Go! | |
| 2008 | Cory in the House | |
| 2008 | Dora the Explorer | |
| 2008 | High School Musical 2 | |
2009
| 2009 | **Dora the Explorer** | |
| 2009 | Go, Diego! Go! | |
| 2009 | Cory in the House | |
| 2009 | True Jackson, VP | |
| 2009 | The Cheetah Girls: One World | |

=== 2010s ===
| Year | Series | Ref |
|---|---|---|
2010
| 2010 | **Dora the Explorer** | |
| 2010 | The Backyardigans | |
| 2010 | Go, Diego! Go! | |
| 2010 | True Jackson, VP | |
| 2010 | Wizards of Waverly Place: The Movie | |
2011
| 2011 | **True Jackson, VP** | |
| 2011 | The Backyardigans | |
| 2011 | Brave New Voices 2010 | |
| 2011 | Dora the Explorer | |
| 2011 | Wizards of Waverly Place | |
2012
| 2012 | **I Can Be President: A Kid's-Eye View** | |
| 2012 | A.N.T. Farm | |
| 2012 | Dora the Explorer | |
| 2012 | Go, Diego! Go! | |
| 2012 | Big Time Rush | |
2013
| 2013 | **Kasha and the Zulu King** | |
| 2013 | Degrassi: The Next Generation | |
| 2013 | The Legend of Korra | |
| 2013 | Nickelodeon HALO Awards | |
| 2013 | Big Time Movie | |
2014
| 2014 | **Wynton Marsalis: A YoungArts MasterClass** | |
| 2014 | A.N.T. Farm | |
| 2014 | Big Time Rush | |
| 2014 | Dora the Explorer | |
| 2014 | Nickelodeon HALO Awards | |
2015
| 2015 | **Doc McStuffins** | |
| 2015 | Anna Deavere Smith: A Youngarts Masterclass | |
| 2015 | Dora and Friends: Into the City! | |
| 2015 | Kid President: Declaration of Awesome | |
| 2015 | Nickelodeon HALO Awards | |
2016
| 2016 | **Doc McStuffins** | |
| 2016 | Dora and Friends | |
| 2016 | K.C. Undercover | |
| 2016 | Little Ballers | |
| 2016 | Project Mc^{2} | |
2017
| 2017 | **An American Girl Story - Melody 1963: Love Has to Win** | |
| 2017 | All In with Cam Newton | |
| 2017 | Doc McStuffins | |
| 2017 | K.C. Undercover | |
| 2017 | The Lion Guard | |
2018
| 2018 | **Doc McStuffins** | |
| 2018 | Free Rein | |
| 2018 | Nella the Princess Knight | |
| 2018 | Project Mc^{2} | |
| 2018 | Raven's Home | |
2019
| 2019 | **Doc McStuffins** | |
| 2019 | Top Chef Junior | |
| 2019 | Sesame Street | |
| 2019 | Marvel's Avengers: Black Panther's Quest | |
| 2019 | Motown Magic | |

=== 2020s ===
| Year | Series | Ref |
|---|---|---|
2020
| 2020 | **Family Reunion** | |
| 2020 | Doc McStuffins | |
| 2020 | Kevin Hart's Guide to Black History | |
| 2020 | Marvel's Avengers: Black Panther's Quest | |
| 2020 | Motown Magic | |
2021
| 2021 | **Family Reunion** | |
| 2021 | Bookmarks: Celebrating Black Voices | |
| 2021 | Craig of the Creek | |
| 2021 | Raven's Home | |
| 2021 | We Are the Dream: The Kids of the Oakland MLK Oratorical | |
2022
| 2022 | **Family Reunion** | |
| 2022 | Ada Twist, Scientist | |
| 2022 | Karma's World | |
| 2022 | Raven's Home | |
| 2022 | Waffles + Mochi | |
2023
| 2023 | **Tab Time** | |
| 2023 | Family Reunion | |
| 2023 | Raising Dion | |
| 2023 | Raven's Home | |
| 2023 | Waffles + Mochi's Restaurant | |
2024
| 2024 | **Gracie's Corner** | |
| 2024 | Ada Twist, Scientist | |
| 2024 | Alma's Way | |
| 2024 | Craig of the Creek | |
| 2024 | My Dad the Bounty Hunter | |
2025
| 2025 | **Gracie's Corner** | |
| 2025 | Descendants: The Rise of Red | |
| 2025 | Craig of the Creek | |
| 2025 | Sesame Street | |
| 2025 | Snoopy Presents: Welcome Home, Franklin | |
2026
| 2026 | **Gracie's Corner** | |
| 2026 | Eyes of Wakanda | |
| 2026 | Iyanu | |
| 2026 | Percy Jackson and the Olympians | |
| 2026 | Reading Rainbow | |

== Multiple wins and nominations ==
=== Wins ===
6 wins

- Teen Summit

4 wins

- Doc McStuffins

3 wins

- That's So Raven
- Family Reunion
- Gracie's Corner

2 wins

- Dora the Explorer

=== Nominations ===
8 nominations

- Reading Rainbow

7 nominations

- Dora the Explorer
- Teen Summit

6 nominations

- Doc McStuffins
- Sesame Street

4 nominations

- Go, Diego! Go!
- Gullah, Gullah Island
- Raven's Home

3 nominations

- The Backyardigans
- Craig of the Creek
- Gracie's Corner
- Nickelodeon HALO Awards
- That's So Raven
- True Jackson, VP

2 nominations

- All That
- A.N.T. Farm
- Big Time Rush
- Cory in the House
- Cousin Skeeter
- K.C. Undercover
- Kenan & Kel
- Little Bill
- The Proud Family
