= 57th NAACP Image Awards =

American entertainment awards for 2025

- Date: February 28, 2026
- Site: Pasadena Civic Auditorium, Pasadena, California
- Hosted by: Deon Cole
- Official website: NAACPImageAwards.net

Highlights
- Best Picture: Sinners
- Best Drama Series: Reasonable Doubt
- Best Musical or Comedy Series: Abbott Elementary
- Most nominations: Sinners: 18 nominations

Television coverage
- Network: BET; CBS

The 57th NAACP Image Awards, presented by the NAACP, honored outstanding representations and achievements of people of color in motion pictures, television, music, and literature during the 2025 calendar year. The ceremony aired on February 28, 2026, on BET and simulcast on CBS, hosted by Deon Cole. Untelevised Image Awards categories would livestream February 26 on the Image Awards website.

Submissions were received online from September 16 to November 7, 2025, and public online voting on the shortlisted nominations for performance categories ran from January 12 to February 7, 2026, on the Image Awards website.

Sinners became the second and highest most nominated film in the ceremony's history with a record breaking 18 nominations and securing 13 wins, including Outstanding Motion Picture. The title was previously held two years prior by The Color Purple, which had a historic record of 13 nominations and 11 wins.

== Winners and nominees ==
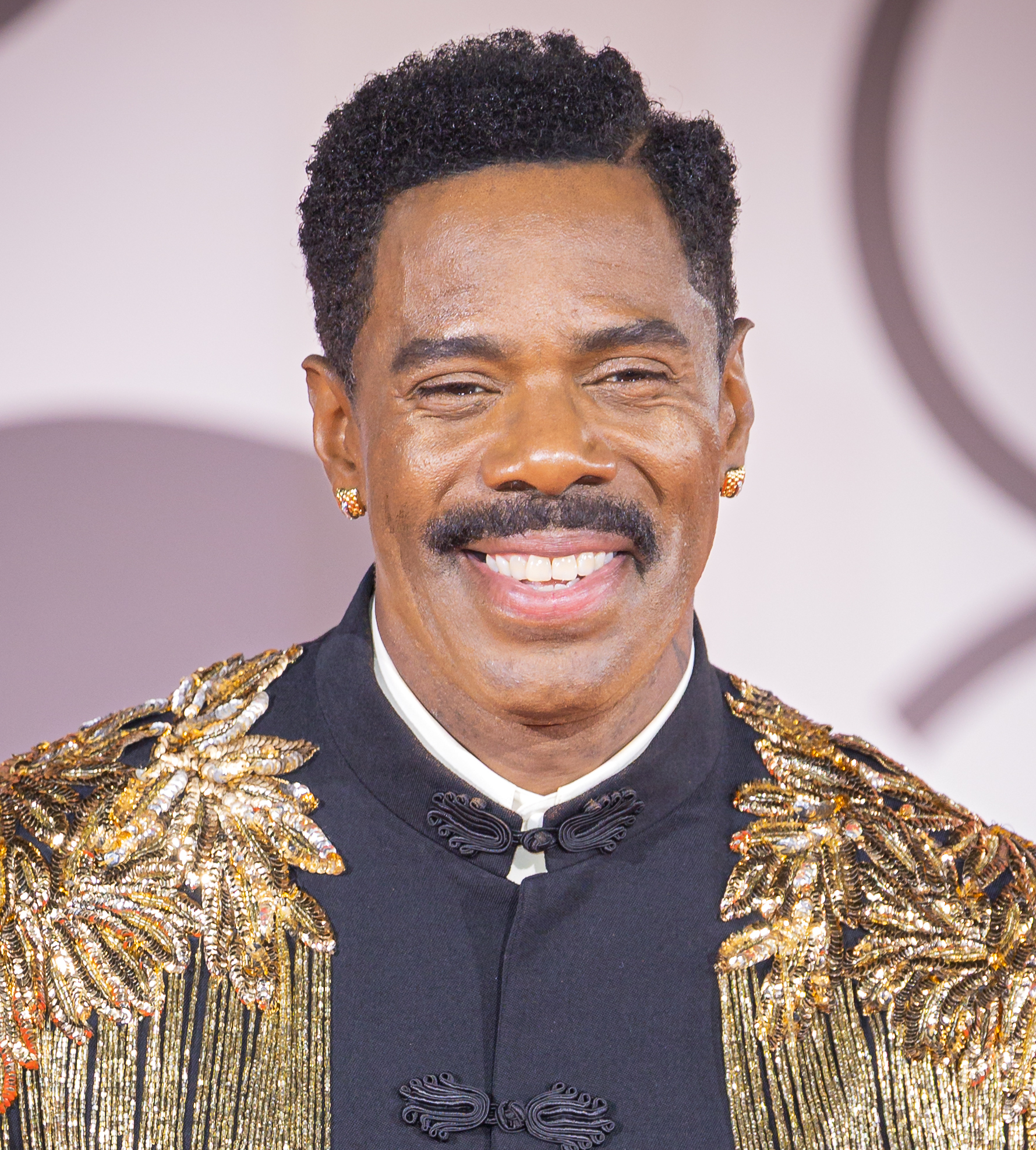
Colman Domingo was honored with the President's Award.

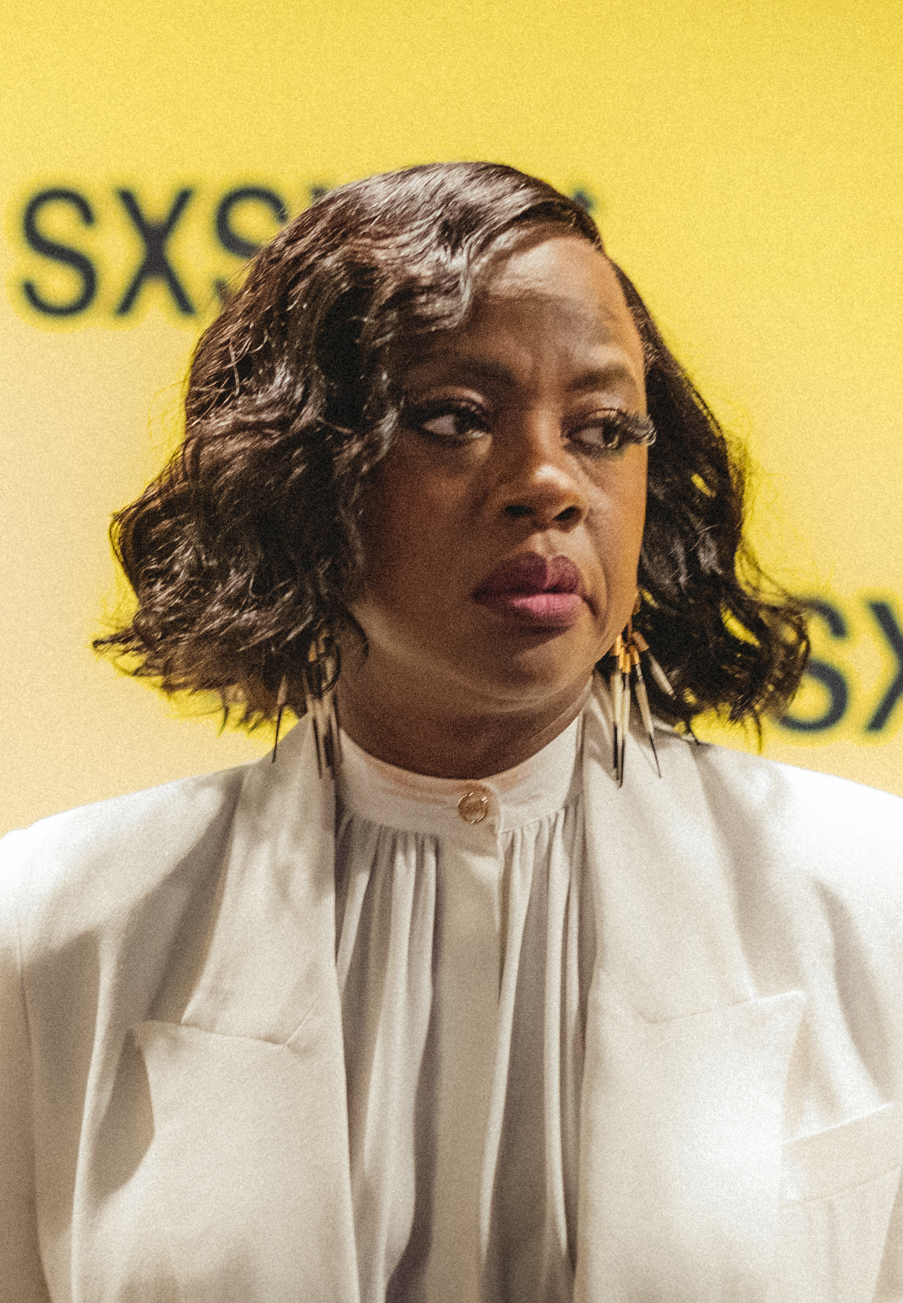
Viola Davis was honored with the Chairman's Award.

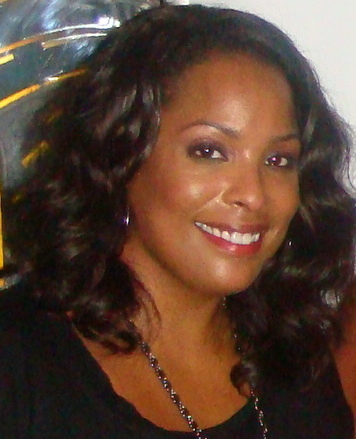
DJ Spinderella was inducted into Hall of Fame Award.

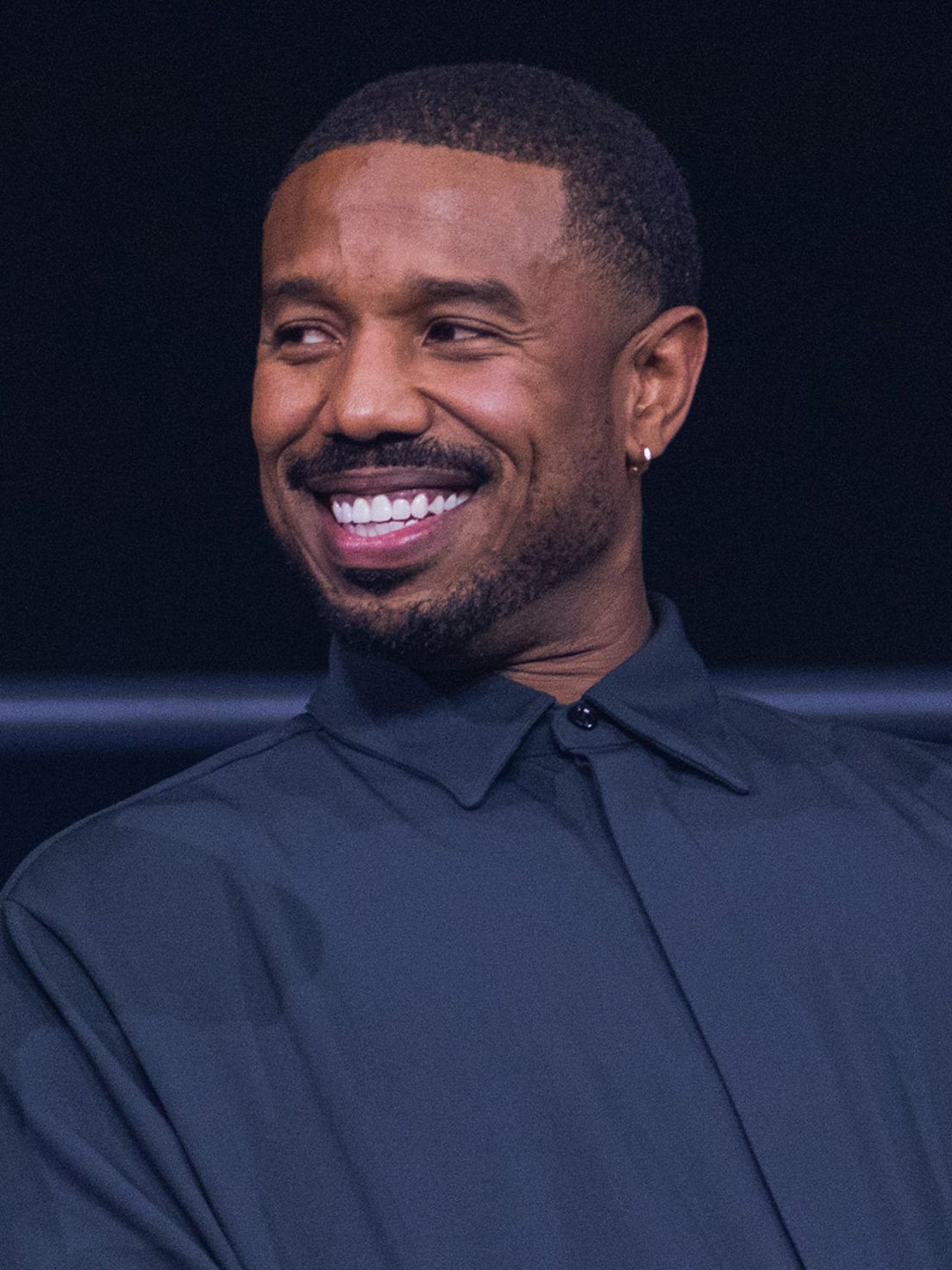
Michael B. Jordan received the award for Entertainer of the Year.

All nominees are listed below, and the winners are listed in bold.

=== Special awards ===
President's Award
- **Colman Domingo**
Chairman's Award
- **Viola Davis**
Hall of Fame Award
- **Salt-N-Pepa**
- **DJ Spinderella**
Entertainer of the Year
- **Michael B. Jordan**
  - Cynthia Erivo
  - Doechii
  - Kendrick Lamar
  - Teyana Taylor
NAACP-Archewell Digital Civil Rights Award
- **Mary Anne Franks**

=== Motion Picture ===
Outstanding Motion Picture	Outstanding Directing in a Motion Picture
**Sinners**; Highest 2 Lowest; One of Them Days; Sarah's Oil; Wicked: For Good	**Ryan Coogler – Sinners**; Elijah Bynum – Magazine Dreams; Guillermo del Toro – Frankenstein; Lawrence Lamont – One of Them Days; R. T. Thorne – 40 Acres
Outstanding Actor in a Motion Picture	Outstanding Actress in a Motion Picture
**Michael B. Jordan – Sinners**; André Holland – Love, Brooklyn; Denzel Washington – Highest 2 Lowest; Nnamdi Asomugha – The Knife; Tyriq Withers – Him	**Cynthia Erivo – Wicked: For Good**; Danielle Deadwyler – 40 Acres; Keke Palmer – One of Them Days; Kerry Washington – Shadow Force; Tessa Thompson – Hedda
Outstanding Supporting Actor in a Motion Picture	Outstanding Supporting Actress in a Motion Picture
**Delroy Lindo – Sinners**; ASAP Rocky – Highest 2 Lowest; Damson Idris – F1; Jeffrey Wright – Highest 2 Lowest; Miles Caton – Sinners	**Wunmi Mosaku – Sinners**; Janelle James – One of Them Days; Jayme Lawson – Sinners; Regina Hall – One Battle After Another; Teyana Taylor – One Battle After Another
Outstanding International Motion Picture	Outstanding Independent Motion Picture
**Souleymane's Story**; 40 Acres; My Father's Shadow; The Fisherman; The Secret Agent	**Love, Brooklyn**; 40 Acres; Magazine Dreams; Opus; Unexpected Christmas
Outstanding Breakthrough Performance in a Motion Picture	Outstanding Ensemble Cast in a Motion Picture
**Miles Caton – Sinners**; ASAP Rocky – Highest 2 Lowest; Chase Infiniti – One Battle After Another; Tabitha Brown – Unexpected Christmas; Tyriq Withers – Him	**Michael B. Jordan, Hailee Steinfeld, Miles Caton, Jack O'Connell, Wunmi Mosaku, Jayme Lawson, Omar Benson Miller, Buddy Guy, Delroy Lindo, Peter Dreimanis, Lola Kirke, Li Jun Li, Saul Williams, Yao – Sinners**; Keke Palmer, SZA, Vanessa Bell Calloway, Lil Rel Howery, Katt Williams – One of Them Days; Jonathan Bailey, Marissa Bode, Colman Domingo, Cynthia Erivo, Jeff Goldblum, Ariana Grande, Ethan Slater, Bowen Yang, Michelle Yeoh – Wicked: For Good; Denzel Washington, Jeffrey Wright, Ilfenesh Hadera, ASAP Rocky – Highest 2 Lowest; Idris Elba, Rebecca Ferguson, Gabriel Basso, Jared Harris, Tracy Letts, Anthony Ramos, Moses Ingram, Jonah Hauer-King, Greta Lee, Jason Clarke – A House of Dynamite
Outstanding Animated Motion Picture	Outstanding Character Voice Performance – Motion Picture
**Zootopia 2**; Elio; KPop Demon Hunters; Sneaks; The Bad Guys 2	**Quinta Brunson – Zootopia 2**; Anthony Mackie – Sneaks; Craig Robinson – The Bad Guys 2; Danielle Brooks – The Bad Guys 2; Lil Rel Howery – Dog Man
Outstanding Short Form (Live Action)	Outstanding Short Form (Animated)
**Ella**; ADO; Before You Let Go; Best Eyes; Food for the Soul	**Wednesdays with Gramps**; ASALI: Power of the Pollinators; Black Man, Black Man; Captain Zero: Into the Abyss Part II; Jazzy Bells
Outstanding Breakthrough Creative (Motion Picture)	Outstanding Writing in a Motion Picture
**Cassandra Mann – Unexpected Christmas**; Contessa Gayles – Songs from the Hole; Nnamdi Asomugha – The Knife; R. T. Thorne – 40 Acres; Rachael Abigail Holder – Love, Brooklyn	**Ryan Coogler – Sinners**; Chloé Zhao – Hamnet; Nora Garrett – After the Hunt; Syreeta Singleton – One of Them Days; Walter Mosley and Nadia Latif – The Man in My Basement
Outstanding Youth Performance in a Motion Picture	Outstanding Cinematography in a Feature Film
**Naya Desir-Johnson – Sarah's Oil**; Amari Price – The Knife; Estella K. Kahiha – The Woman in the Yard; Jahleel Kamara – Shadow Force; Peyton Jackson – The Woman in the Yard	**Autumn Durald Arkapaw – Sinners**; Kira Kelly – Him; Martim Vian – Love, Brooklyn; Sean Bobbitt – Hedda; Shabier Kirchner – Materialists

=== Documentary ===
Outstanding Documentary	Outstanding Directing in a Documentary (Motion Picture or Television)
**Being Eddie**; Fatherless No More; Left Behind; The Perfect Neighbor; Who in the Hell is Regina Jones?	**Reginald Hudlin, Shola Lynch – Number One on the Call Sheet**; Ahmir "Questlove" Thompson – Sly Lives! (aka The Burden of Black Genius); Andre Gaines – Boo-Yah – A Portrait of Stuart Scott; Contessa Gayles – Songs from the Hole; Yemi Oyediran – King of Them All: The Story of King Records
Outstanding Documentary (Television)	Outstanding Short Form Documentary
**Number One on the Call Sheet**; A Star Without A Star: The Untold Juanita Moore Story; Eyes on the Prize III: We Who Believe in Freedom Cannot Rest 1977-2015; Great Migrations: A People on the Move; High Horse: The Black Cowboy	**The Ebony Canal: A Story of Black Infant Health**; Black Longevity; CIRILO, A Legacy Untold; Freeman Vines; Masaka Kids, a Rhythm Within

=== Television ===
==== Drama ====
Outstanding Drama Series
**Reasonable Doubt**; Bel-Air; Beyond the Gates; Forever; Paradise
Outstanding Actor in a Drama Series	Outstanding Actress in a Drama Series
**Sterling K. Brown – Paradise**; Forest Whitaker – Godfather of Harlem; Jabari Banks – Bel-Air; Michael Cooper Jr. – Forever; Morris Chestnut – Watson	**Angela Bassett – 9-1-1**; Emayatzy Corinealdi – Reasonable Doubt; Lovie Simone – Forever; Patina Miller – Power Book III: Raising Kanan; Queen Latifah – The Equalizer
Outstanding Supporting Actor in a Drama Series	Outstanding Supporting Actress in a Drama Series
**Caleb McLaughlin – Stranger Things**; Adrian Holmes – Bel-Air; Ato Essandoh – The Diplomat; Jacob Latimore – The Chi; Wood Harris – Forever	**Aisha Hinds – 9-1-1**; Audra McDonald – The Gilded Age; Karen Pittman – Forever; Karen Pittman – The Morning Show; Nicole Beharie – The Morning Show
Outstanding Directing in a Drama Series	Outstanding Writing in a Dramatic Series
**Mario Van Peebles – Power Book III: Raising Kanan**; Angela Barnes – Ironheart; Anton Cropper – Reasonable Doubt; Jet Wilkinson – The Copenhagen Test; Salli Richardson-Whitfield – The Gilded Age	**Cynthia Adarkwa – The Pitt**; Ajani Jackson – Law & Order; Bryce Ahart, Stephanie McFarlane – FBI; C.A. Johnson – The Beast in Me; Walter Mosley – The Lowdown

==== Comedy ====
Outstanding Comedy Series
**Abbott Elementary**; Harlem; Survival of the Thickest; The Residence; The Upshaws
Outstanding Actor in a Comedy Series	Outstanding Actress in a Comedy Series
**Cedric the Entertainer – The Neighborhood**; David Alan Grier – St. Denis Medical; David Oyelowo – Government Cheese; Mike Epps – The Upshaws; Vince Staples – The Vince Staples Show	**Quinta Brunson – Abbott Elementary**; Ayo Edebiri – The Bear; Maya Rudolph – Loot; Michelle Buteau – Survival of the Thickest; Uzo Aduba – The Residence
Outstanding Supporting Actor in a Comedy Series	Outstanding Supporting Actress in a Comedy Series
**William Stanford Davis – Abbott Elementary**; Colman Domingo – The Four Seasons; Giancarlo Esposito – The Residence; Josh Johnson – The Daily Show; Wendell Pierce – Elsbeth	**Janelle James – Abbott Elementary**; Edwina Findley – The Residence; Ego Nwodim – Saturday Night Live; Jerrie Johnson – Harlem; Wanda Sykes – The Upshaws
Outstanding Directing in a Comedy Series	Outstanding Writing in a Comedy Series
**Tyler James Williams – Abbott Elementary**; Amy Aniobi – Survival of the Thickest; Colman Domingo – The Four Seasons; Paul Hunter – Government Cheese; Theodore Witcher – Demascus	**Aisha Muharrar – Hacks**; Frida Perez – The Studio; Lizzy Darrell – Abbott Elementary; Monique D. Hall – Sesame Street; Naomi Ekperigin – St. Denis Medical

==== Television Movie, Limited-Series or Dramatic Special ====
Outstanding Television Movie, Mini-Series or Special
**Straw**; G20; Ironheart; Ruth & Boaz; Washington Black
Outstanding Actor in a Television Movie, Mini-Series or Special	Outstanding Actress in a Television Movie, Mini-Series or Special
**Tyler Lepley – Ruth & Boaz**; Brian Tyree Henry – Dope Thief; Giancarlo Esposito – Please Don't Feed the Children; Idris Elba – Heads of State; Taye Diggs – Terry McMillan Presents: His, Hers & Ours	**Taraji P. Henson – Straw**; Brandy Norwood – Christmas Everyday!; Dominique Thorne – Ironheart; Serayah – Ruth & Boaz; Viola Davis – G20
Outstanding Supporting Actor in a Television Movie, Limited-Series or Special	Outstanding Supporting Actress in a Television Movie, Limited-Series or Special
**Glynn Turman – Straw**; Jay Ellis – All Her Fault; Rockmond Dunbar – Straw; Sterling K. Brown – Washington Black; Ving Rhames – Dope Thief	**Teyana Taylor – Straw**; Angela Bassett – Zero Day; Lyric Ross – Ironheart; Marsai Martin – G20; Sherri Shepherd – Straw
Outstanding Directing in a Television Movie, Documentary or Special	Outstanding Writing in a Television Movie, Documentary or Special
**Olatunde Osunsanmi – Star Trek: Section 31**; Alanna Brown – Ruth & Boaz; Nicole G. Leier – Trapped in the Spotlight; Tailiah Breon – Not My Family: The Monique Smith Story; Troy A. Scott – I'll Never Let You Go	**Aireka Muse – Friends & Lovers**; Jas Summers – Stay; Jerrod Carmichael – Jerrod Carmichael: Don't Be Gay; Michael Elliott and Cory Tynan – Ruth & Boaz; Roye Okupe and Brandon M. Easton – Iyanu: The Age of Wonders

==== Overall Acting ====
Outstanding Character Voice-Over Performance (Television)	Outstanding Guest Performance
**Kyla Pratt – The Proud Family: Louder and Prouder**; Anika Noni Rose – The Mighty Nein; Ayo Edebiri – Big Mouth; Cedric the Entertainer – The Proud Family: Louder and Prouder; Graceyn Hollingsworth – Gracie's Corner	**Malcolm-Jamal Warner – Murder in a Small Town**; Brandee Evans – Reasonable Doubt; Dave Chappelle – Saturday Night Live; Janet Hubert – Bel-Air; Morris Chestnut – Reasonable Doubt
Outstanding Performance by a Youth (Series, Special, Television Movie or Limited-series)
**Leah Sava Jeffries – Percy Jackson and the Olympians**; Amanda Christine – It: Welcome to Derry; Blake Cameron James – It: Welcome to Derry; Jeremiah Felder – The Residence; Percy Daggs IV – Paradise

==== Reality and Variety ====
Outstanding Talk Series	Outstanding Reality Program, Reality Competition Series or Game Show
**The Jennifer Hudson Show**; House Guest; Sherri; Tamron Hall; The View	**Celebrity Family Feud**; Dancing with the Stars; Full Court Press; Love & Marriage: Huntsville; Ready for Love
Outstanding News / Information – (Series or Special)	Outstanding Host in a Talk or News / Information (Series or Special)
**The Don Lemon Show**; CNN NewsNight; Finding Your Roots; Hurricane Katrina: 20 Years After the Storm; Michelle Obama: The Style, The Power, The Look: A Conversation with Robin Roberts	**Don Lemon – The Don Lemon Show**; Abby Phillip – CNN NewsNight; Henry Louis Gates Jr. – Finding Your Roots; Scott Evans – House Guest; Sherri Shepherd – Sherri
Outstanding Variety Show (Series or Special)	Outstanding Host in a Reality, Game Show or Variety (Series or Special)
**Ali Siddiq: My Two Sons**; Tiny Desk Concerts Celebrates Black Music Month 2025; BET Awards 2025; HBCU Honors; Wicked: One Wonderful Night	**Steve Harvey – Celebrity Family Feud**; Kevin Hart – BET Awards 2025; Alfonso Ribeiro and Julianne Hough – Dancing with the Stars; Barbara Corcoran, Lori Greiner, Robert Herjavec, Daymond John, Daniel Lubetzky, Kevin O'Leary – Shark Tank; Bozoma St. John and Jimmy Fallon – On Brand with Jimmy Fallon

==== Other Categories ====
Outstanding Short-Form Series or Special – Reality/Nonfiction/Documentary	Outstanding Animated Series
**The Apple Music Super Bowl LIX Halftime Show with Kendrick Lamar**; College GameDay; Glam Through The Ages; Noochie's Live From The Front Porch; The Daily Show: After The Cut	**Gracie's Corner**; Ariel; Iyanu; Iwájú; Weather Hunters
Outstanding Children's Program	Outstanding Breakthrough Creative (Television)
**Gracie's Corner**; Iyanu; Eyes of Wakanda; Percy Jackson and the Olympians; Reading Rainbow	**Chinaka Hodge – Ironheart**; Daniel Lawrence Taylor – Boarders; Haolu Wang – Black Mirror; Jas Summers – Stay; Tearrance Averelle Chisolm – Demascus

=== Costume Design, Make-up and Hairstyling ===
Outstanding Costume Design	Outstanding Make-up
**Sinners – Ruth E. Carter**; Bel-Air – Queensylvia Akuchie; Highest 2 Lowest – Francine Jamison-Tanchuck; Love, Brooklyn – Missy Mickens; Wicked: For Good – Paul Tazewell	**Bel-Air – Alyssa Hudson**; All's Fair – Kate Biscoe; Chief of War – Christien Tinsley; Highest 2 Lowest – Ngozi Olandu Young; Sinners – Ken Diaz
Outstanding Hairstyling
**Reasonable Doubt – Deaundra Metzger**; All's Fair – Valerie Jackson; Bel-Air – Terry Hunt; Beyond the Gates – Wankala L. Hinkson; Sinners – Shunika Terry

=== Stunt ===
Outstanding Stunt Ensemble (TV or Film)
- **Sinners – Andy Gill**
  - Butterfly – Yeonheon Jung
  - F1 – Gary Powell
  - G20 – Grant Powell
  - Shadow Force – Dartenea Bryant

=== Recording ===
Outstanding Album	Outstanding New Artist
**Am I the Drama? – Cardi B**; Beloved – Giveon; Let God Sort Em Out – Clipse, Pusha T, Malice; Mutt Deluxe: Heel – Leon Thomas; SOS Deluxe: Lana – SZA	**Monaleo**; Elmiene; Lee Vasi; Madison McFerrin; Ravyn Lenae
Outstanding Male Artist	Outstanding Female Artist
**Kendrick Lamar**; Bryson Tiller; Chris Brown; Giveon; Leon Thomas	**Cardi B**; Alex Isley; Doechii; SZA; Teyana Taylor
Outstanding Duo, Group or Collaboration (Traditional)	Outstanding Duo, Group or Collaboration (Contemporary)
**"Boots on the Ground (Remix)" – 803Fresh feat. Fantasia**; "Chains & Whips" – Clipse, Kendrick Lamar, Pharrell Williams, Pusha T, Malice; "For Good" – Cynthia Erivo, Ariana Grande; "Jesus I Do" – Mariah Carey with The Clark Sisters; "Let Freedom Ring" – Travis Greene with Andra Day	**"It Depends (Remix)" – Chris Brown feat. Bryson Tiller & Usher**; "Safe" – Cardi B feat. Kehlani; "Worst Behavior" – Kwn feat. Kehlani; "The Mood" – FLO; "Mutt (Remix)" – Leon Thomas feat. Chris Brown
Outstanding Soul/R&B Song	Outstanding Hip Hop/Rap Song
**"It Depends" – Chris Brown feat. Bryson Tiller**; "Folded" – Kehlani; "Burning Blue" – Mariah the Scientist; "Yes It Is" – Leon Thomas; "Bed of Roses” – Teyana Taylor	**"ErrTime" – Cardi B**; "Anxiety" — Doechii; "Chains & Whips" – Clipse, Kendrick Lamar, Pharrell Williams, Pusha T, Malice; "Ride (Remix)" – Chance the Rapper feat. Do or Die & Twista; "Typa" – GloRilla
Outstanding International Song	Outstanding Music Video/Visual Album
**"Is It" – Tyla**; "In Our Sight" – Skip Marley; "Love" – Burna Boy; "With You" – Davido feat. Omah Lay; "You4Me" – Tiwa Savage	**"luther" – Kendrick Lamar feat. SZA**; "Anxiety" – Doechii; "Boots on the Ground" – 803Fresh; Escape Room – Teyana Taylor; "Folded" – Kehlani
Outstanding Original Score for TV/Film	Outstanding Soundtrack/Compilation Album
**Sinners**; Boots; Eyes of Wakanda; Ironheart: Vol. 1; One of Them Days	**Sinners**; Godfather of Harlem: Season 4; Highest 2 Lowest; The Proud Family: Louder and Prouder: Season 3; Wicked: For Good
Outstanding Gospel/Christian Album	Outstanding Gospel/Christian Song
**Tasha – Tasha Cobbs Leonard**; Jekalyn X the Legends – Jekalyn Carr; Live at Maverick City – Maverick City Music; Only on the Road (Live) – Tye Tribbett; The Live Reunion: Washington D.C. – Jj hairston and Youthful Praise	**"Do It Again" – Kirk Franklin**; "Church" – Tasha Cobbs Leonard with John Legend; "Constant (Live)" – Maverick City Music, Jordin Sparks, Chandler Moore, Anthony Gargiulo; "Don't Faint" – Jekalyn Carr; "Jesus I Do" – Mariah Carey with The Clark Sisters
Outstanding Jazz Album
**We Insist! 2025 – Terri Lyne Carrington and Christie Dashiell**; For Dinah – Ledisi; Beneath the Skin – Nnenna Freelon; Live-Action – Nate Smith – Nate Smith; Griot Songs – Omar Thomas Large Ensemble
