= Zoe Terry =

American businesswoman

- Born: 2006 or 2007 (age 19–20)
- Known for: Zoe's Dolls

Zoe Terry is the founder of Zoe’s Dolls, an organization focused on increasing representation of dolls of color and promoting self-esteem initiatives for girls.

Terry, with her mother Nakia Bowling, founded Zoe's Dolls while living in Miami at the age of five after experiencing bullying related to her appearance and when she realized there weren't dolls for children of color.

== Awards and honors ==
In 2017, Terry was named a recipient of the Nickelodeon HALO Award, which recognizes young people for community leadership and service.

As of 2025, Zoe's Dolls had given out more than 60,000 dolls.

== Publications ==
- Simply Zoe. CreateSpace. 2017. ISBN 978-1979741170.
