= NAACP Image Award for Outstanding Animated Series =

American television award

This article lists the winners and nominees for the NAACP Image Award for Outstanding Animated Series.

== History ==
This award has been given since 2021. Several animated series, including Doc McStuffins, Dora the Explorer and The Proud Family, were previously the recipient of multiple awards and nominations for Outstanding Children's Program, with Little Bill being the first to receive a nomination in 2001 and Dora the Explorer being the first to win the award in 2009.

== Winners and nominees ==
Winners are listed first and highlighted in bold.

Year	Series	Ref
2021
2021	**Doc McStuffins**	
2021	Big Mouth	
2021	Central Park	
2021	She-Ra and the Princesses of Power	
2021	Star Trek: Lower Decks	
2022
2022	**We the People**	
2022	Big Mouth	
2022	Peanut Headz: Black History Toonz	
2022	Super Sema	
2022	Yasuke	
2023
2023	**The Proud Family: Louder and Prouder**	
2023	Central Park	
2023	Eureka!	
2023	Gracie's Corner	
2023	Zootopia+	
2024
2024	**The Proud Family: Louder and Prouder**	
2024	Gracie's Corner	
2024	Spidey and His Amazing Friends	
2024	Big Mouth	
2024	Young Love	
2025
2025	**Gracie's Corner**	
2025	Everybody Still Hates Chris	
2025	Ariel	
2025	Iwájú	
2025	Moon Girl and Devil Dinosaur	
2026		
2026	**Gracie's Corner**	
2026	Lil Kev	
2026	Ariel	
2026	Iyanu	
2026	Weather Hunters	
