= Tee Sanders =

American comedian

Tee Sanders is an American comedian. She is best known for her appearances on the YouTube series Round Table Game Show. She won the 2026 NAACP Image Award for Outstanding Digital Content Creator (Arts/Comedy).

== Life and career ==
Sanders was born and raised in Chicago. She never considered a comedy career while growing up, even though she was encouraged to by her family. She made the decision to pursue comedy in her early twenties and used Instagram and TikTok to build a fan base. Big Laugh Comedy described her comedic style: "She's quick. She's real. And she has a way of making an entire room feel like they're in on the joke together."

Sanders is a regular cast member on the Atlanta-based Round Table Game Show. She is a contestant on the Netflix stand-up comedy competition series Funny AF that premiered in April 2026.

Sanders is a lesbian. She resides in Killeen, Texas.

== Accolades ==
- 2026 – Winner, 57th NAACP Image Award for Outstanding Digital Content Creator (Arts/Comedy)
