= Sherri (talk show) =

American syndicated talk show

- Genre: Talk show
- Created by: Sherri Shepherd
- Showrunners: David Perler (S1); Fernita Wynn (S2–3); Joelle Dawson-Calia (S4)
- Presented by: Sherri Shepherd
- Narrated by: Rolonda Watts
- Theme music composer: David Vanacore
- Opening theme: "Feeling Good" by Trenyce
- Ending theme: "Feeling Good" by Trenyce
- Country of origin: United States
- Original language: English
- No. of seasons: 4
- No. of episodes: 596

Production
- Executive producers: Sherri Shepherd; David Perler (S1); Jawn Murray (S1–3); Fernita Wynn (S2–3); Joelle Dawson-Calia (S2–4)
- Production locations: Chelsea Studios, New York City
- Camera setup: Multi-camera
- Running time: 43 minutes
- Production companies: Debmar-Mercury; Perler Productions (S1); Talk WW Productions, Inc

Original release
- Network: Syndication
- Release: September 12, 2022 – May 21, 2026

Sherri, also known as The Sherri Show, is an American syndicated daytime talk show hosted by actress and comedian, Sherri Shepherd. The show aired from September 12, 2022, to May 21, 2026, and was distributed by Debmar-Mercury, with the Fox Television Stations as its major affiliate base.

== Production ==
Sherri was filmed live in Chelsea Studios in New York, with two tapings a day. The series served as a de facto replacement and placeholder for The Wendy Williams Show, for which Shepherd served as an interim host in much of the last portion of the thirteenth season, which showed its lowest ratings; due to personal and medical issues involving Williams. Much of the production team for Wendy thus carried over to Shepherd's show, along with its existing studio re-configured with a new set design. In January 2023, the series was renewed for its second and third seasons through 2025. On March 20, 2025, it was renewed for a fourth and final season.

On February 2, 2026, it was announced that the show was being withdrawn from syndication after four seasons, with the final episode airing on May 21, 2026; however, Debmar-Mercury stated that they were seeking another outlet for the program that would be a better fit than daytime television, but this did not materialize.

== Awards and nominations ==
Awards and nominations for Sherri
Year	Award	Category	Nominee(s)	Result	Ref.
2023	54th NAACP Image Awards	Outstanding Talk Series	Sherri	Won	
2023	Daytime Emmy Awards	Outstanding Entertainment Talk Show Host	Sherri Shepherd	Nominated	
2023	Daytime Emmy Awards	Outstanding Daytime Promotional Announcement	Sherri	Nominated	
2023	Daytime Emmy Awards	Outstanding Hairstyling and Makeup	Sherri	Nominated	
2023	Daytime Emmy Awards	Outstanding Costume Design/Styling	Sherri	Nominated	
2024	People's Choice Awards	The Daytime Talk Show	Sherri	Nominated	
2024	55th NAACP Image Awards	Outstanding Talk Series	Sherri	Nominated	
2024	55th NAACP Image Awards	Outstanding Host in a Talk or News/Information (Series or Special) - Individual or Ensemble	Sherri Shepherd	Won	
2024	Daytime Emmy Awards	Outstanding Hairstyling and Makeup	Sherri	Nominated	
2024	Daytime Emmy Awards	Outstanding Costume Design/Styling	Sherri	Nominated	
2025	56th NAACP Image Awards	Outstanding Talk Series	Sherri	Nominated	
2025	56th NAACP Image Awards	Outstanding Host in a Talk or News / Information (Series or Special)	Sherri Shepherd	Nominated	
2026	57th NAACP Image Awards	Outstanding Talk Series	Sherri	Nominated	
2026	57th NAACP Image Awards	Outstanding Host in a Talk or News / Information (Series or Special)	Sherri Shepherd	Nominated	
