= NAACP Image Award for Outstanding Animated Motion Picture =

American film award

This article lists the winners and nominees for the NAACP Image Award for Outstanding Animated Motion Picture.

== History ==
This award has been given since 2021. Previously in 2010, The Princess and the Frog became the first animated film to receive a nomination for any Image Award, being nominated for Outstanding Motion Picture.

== Winners and nominees ==
Winners are listed first and highlighted in bold.

| Year | Film | Ref |
|---|---|---|
2021
| 2021 | **Soul** | |
| 2021 | Onward | |
| 2021 | Over the Moon | |
| 2021 | Scoob! | |
| 2021 | Trolls World Tour | |
2022
| 2022 | **Encanto** | |
| 2022 | Luca | |
| 2022 | Raya and the Last Dragon | |
| 2022 | Sing 2 | |
| 2022 | Vivo | |
2023
| 2023 | **Wendell & Wild** | |
| 2023 | DC League of Super-Pets | |
| 2023 | Guillermo del Toro's Pinocchio | |
| 2023 | Puss in Boots: The Last Wish | |
| 2023 | Turning Red | |
2024
| 2024 | **Spider-Man: Across the Spider-Verse** | |
| 2024 | Elemental | |
| 2024 | Lil’ Ruby | |
| 2024 | Teenage Mutant Ninja Turtles: Mutant Mayhem | |
| 2024 | Wish | |
2025
| 2025 | **Inside Out 2** | |
| 2025 | Kung Fu Panda 4 | |
| 2025 | Moana 2 | |
| 2025 | Piece by Piece | |
| 2025 | The Wild Robot | |
2026
| 2026 | **Zootopia 2** | |
| 2026 | Elio | |
| 2026 | KPop Demon Hunters | |
| 2026 | Sneaks | |
| 2026 | The Bad Guys 2 | |
