= Straw (film) =

2025 American psychological thriller film

- Release poster
- Directed by: Tyler Perry
- Written by: Tyler Perry
- Produced by: Tyler Perry; Angi Bones; Tony Strickland
- Starring: Taraji P. Henson; Sherri Shepherd; Teyana Taylor; Sinbad; Rockmond Dunbar; Ashley Versher; Mike Merrill; Glynn Turman
- Cinematography: Justyn Moro
- Edited by: Nick Coker
- Music by: Dara Taylor
- Production company: Tyler Perry Studios
- Distributed by: Netflix
- Release date: June 6, 2025
- Running time: 108 minutes
- Country: United States
- Language: English

STRAW is a 2025 American psychological crime drama film written, produced and directed by Tyler Perry. It follows a single mother struggling to provide for her ill daughter as a series of events drive her to extreme measures. The film stars Taraji P. Henson, Sherri Shepherd, Teyana Taylor, Sinbad, Rockmond Dunbar, Ashley Versher, Mike Merrill, and Glynn Turman. It is also the third Tyler Perry movie to star Henson as the central character after I Can Do Bad All By Myself (2009) and Acrimony (2018).

Straw was released by Netflix on June 6, 2025.

== Plot ==
Janiyah Wiltkinson is a single mother living in a dilapidated apartment with her frequently ill daughter, Aria. One morning, Aria expresses frustration over her inability to bathe herself and tells Janiyah that her teacher said she couldn't afford lunch. Though visibly upset, Janiyah focuses on getting to work.

As she leaves, Janiyah gives spare change to Benny, a neighbor in a wheelchair, prompting her landlord to threaten eviction unless rent is paid by 10:00 a.m. After dropping Aria off at school, Janiyah goes to her grocery store job, where a family throws a glass bottle at her after she refuses to process a WIC transaction for ineligible items. Her unsympathetic boss, Richard, orders her to clean up the mess. While in the back room, a friend who pities her attempts to help by offering her some money, but Janiyah refuses.

During her shift, Janiyah receives a call from the school reporting that Aria has sustained injuries, requesting her presence. Janiyah tries to explain they occurred during a seizure in the bathtub, but the school insists she comes over. Furious that she always makes up excuses, Richard threatens to fire her if she doesn't return within 30 minutes, and refuses to pay her check when she politely asks.

She rushes to the bank to withdraw lunch money for Aria but is delayed by a long line. When she finally arrives at the school, she is confronted by the principal and Child Protective Services, who question her ability to care for the child and take Aria into custody despite her pleas.

Driving back to work in the rain, Janiyah accidentally cuts off an off-duty police officer, who retaliates by throwing a drink at her and forcing her off the road. He also threatens to find a legal way to kill her. Responding officers impound her car due to expired documents. When she returns to her job, Janiyah is fired, and Richard again refuses to issue her paycheck. Upon arriving home, she finds she has been evicted and her belongings discarded.

Janiyah returns to the store to confront her boss. While there, two armed robbers enter, where one addresses her by her name written on her name tag; one demands Aria's backpack, and when Janiyah refuses, she is assaulted. In the struggle, she grabs a gun and fatally shoots one of the robbers while the other one escapes. Despite explaining that the robber knew her name from her tag, Richard accuses her of staging the robbery and calls 911. He ruthlessly adds that he will like to see what sort of parent she will make from prison, upon which she shoots and kills Richard, then flees with her paycheck.

At the bank, Tessa, a teller, refuses to cash her check without proper identification, pushing Janiyah to pull out the gun in desperation. The teller complies, but a silent alarm is triggered. The bank manager, Nicole, recognizes Janiyah and attempts to calm her. Meanwhile, Detectives Raymond and Grimes, already investigating the earlier incident at the store, are alerted to the robbery.

Raymond, a former Army negotiator, speaks to Janiyah over the phone and gradually establishes a rapport. Meanwhile, inside the bank, a teller secretly livestreams the standoff, drawing public sympathy. From the news coverage inside the bank, Janiyah sees all of the police outside, including the one who threatened to kill her earlier. She refuses to surrender unless that officer is removed from the situation, as she believes he will kill her when she steps outside. When Janiyah discovers that the security cameras are on, she immediately demands that they switch them off. Nicole and Janiyah work together to disable the bank's cameras.

Meanwhile public support for Janiyah grows as the citizens rally outside demanding the police authorities "free Janiyah". Janiyah is frustrated by the science project her daughter made, which looks like a bomb, and attempts to turn it off much to the panic and fear of the hostages in the bank.

Janiyah realizes the confusion regarding the science project and demands that Nicole call Detective Raymond and tell her the item in the backpack is not a bomb, but Nicole suggests otherwise, insisting that the "bomb" was the only thing stopping the police from storming into the bank. Meanwhile, Tessa writes a message on a bathroom window revealing that the supposed bomb in Aria's backpack is actually a science project.

Detective Raymond identifies and confronts the off-duty officer who harassed Janiyah, and has him detained. When the FBI refuses to let Janiyah confirm his identity directly, Raymond sends Nicole in with a photograph. Janiyah confirms the officer's identity and releases the hostages, though Nicole chooses to stay with her.

Janiyah then receives a phone call from her mother, who reminds her that Aria died the night before from a seizure. A flashback reveals that Aria's presence throughout the day was a hallucination, and the earlier phone call from the school and the visit from Child Protective Services never occurred. Nicole, aware of Aria's death, remained to support and protect Janiyah.

Janiyah hallucinates tear gas being fired into the bank and being shot by the FBI. In reality, she peacefully surrenders to Detective Raymond, with Nicole at her side.

== Cast ==
- Taraji P. Henson as Janiyah Wiltkinson
- Sherri Shepherd as Nicole
- Teyana Taylor as Det. Kay Raymond
- Sinbad as Benny
- Rockmond Dunbar as Chief Wilson
- Ashley Versher as Tessa George
- Mike Merrill as Det. Grimes
- Glynn Turman as Richard
- Shalèt Monique as Rayah Dunnam
- Anthony E. Williams as Officer Dickson
- Tilky Jones as Officer Oliver
- Gabby Jackson as Aria

== Production ==
The film is written, directed and produced by Tyler Perry. Also producing are Angi Bones and Tony Strickland for Netflix. It was filmed in Atlanta.

The cast is led by Taraji P. Henson, Sherri Shepherd, Teyana Taylor, Glynn Turman, Sinbad, Rockmond Dunbar. The cast also includes Mike Merrill and Ashley Versher.

== Release ==
Straw made its debut on Netflix on June 6, 2025, when the film premiered exclusively on the streaming platform. Following its release, Straw quickly gained traction, securing a spot in Netflix's Top 10 list during its opening week.

== Reception ==
=== Critics' reception ===
On the review aggregator website Rotten Tomatoes, 55% of 29 critics' reviews are positive. The website's consensus reads: "While Taraji P. Henson puts in a powerful performance, STRAW is ultimately too monotonous with miserableness to sustain its dramatic premise." Metacritic, which uses a weighted average, assigned the film a score of 56 out of 100, based on 7 critics, indicating "mixed or average" reviews.

=== Accolades ===
Award	Date of ceremony	Category	Recipient(s)	Result	Ref.
NAACP Image Awards	February 28, 2026	Outstanding Television Movie, Mini-Series or Special	Straw	Won	
NAACP Image Awards	February 28, 2026	Outstanding Actress in a Television Movie, Mini-Series or Special	Taraji P. Henson	Won	
NAACP Image Awards	February 28, 2026	Outstanding Supporting Actor in a Television Movie, Limited-Series or Special	Glynn Turman	Won	
NAACP Image Awards	February 28, 2026	Outstanding Supporting Actor in a Television Movie, Limited-Series or Special	Rockmond Dunbar	Nominated	
NAACP Image Awards	February 28, 2026	Outstanding Supporting Actress in a Television Movie, Limited-Series or Special	Sherri Shepherd	Nominated	
NAACP Image Awards	February 28, 2026	Outstanding Supporting Actress in a Television Movie, Limited-Series or Special	Teyana Taylor	Won	
Society of Composers & Lyricists Awards	February 6, 2026	Outstanding Original Score for an Independent Film	Dara Taylor	Nominated	

== Viewership ==
According to data from Showlabs, Straw ranked second on Netflix in the United States for two consecutive weeks, covering 2–8 June and 9–15 June 2025.
