= Jawn Murray =

American journalist

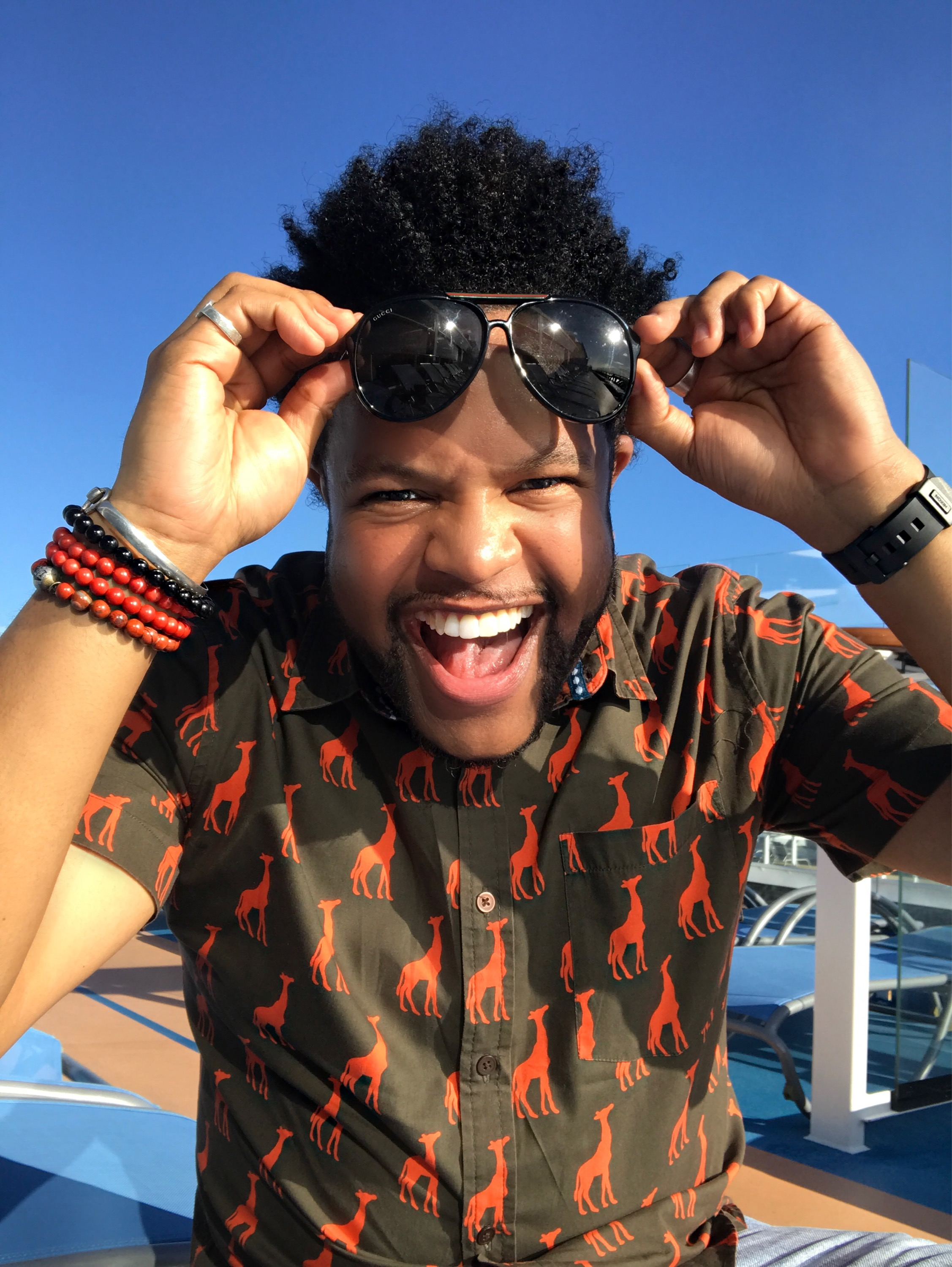
- Born: Warrenton, Virginia, USA
- Occupations: TV host, commentator, executive producer, pop culture expert
- Notable credit(s): AOL Black Voices, Tom Joyner Morning Show, HLN, The Meredith Vieira Show, The Wendy Williams Show, Sherri

Jawn Murray is a Washington, DC–based American TV host, commentator, executive producer, pop culture expert, media personality and social media influencer best known for hosting TV shows for Travel Channel, EPIX and NFL Network, as well as appearing on cable news channels like CNN, HLN and MSNBC. Ebony magazine named him as one of the "30 on the Rise" to watch in the industry, and the NAACP recognized him as one of "40 Power Players Under 40."

== Career ==
Murray was born in Warrenton, Virginia, before relocating to Falls Church, Virginia. He attended Norfolk State University, where he studied Mass Communications. He then interned at the Washington, DC radio station WPGC 95.5 FM, which kicked off his professional career in the entertainment industry. While working as an intern, mid-host Michel Wright hired Murray to research stories for her on-air entertainment news segment because she recognized his passion for celebrity news and pop culture.

At the height of the dot-com boom, Murray launched his own career as an entertainment news reporter from Washington, DC, first with an email newsletter called Garek News before landing a weekly column in the Electronic Urban Report radio newswire and online site, now known as EURweb.com. His writing career would continue to flourish with a widely popular entertainment column called BV Buzz that he penned for AOL's Black Voices channel for seven years.

While working for AOL, Murray landed an additional opportunity as a vacation-relief columnist for the New York Daily News, where he would fill in for the famous "Rush & Molloy" columnists. He would also pen over 20 magazine cover stories for publications like Black Elegance, Savoy, Smooth and Jewel magazines.

In September 2006, he also joined the nationally syndicated Tom Joyner Morning Show as an on-air personality, making him one of the youngest contributors to ever join the Urban Adult Contemporary radio program.

Murray also started doing contributing segments for television, initially making his TV debut on an E! Entertainment series called "Love Chain." He would go on to appear as a subject matter expert on both Court TV and HLN, as well as doing commentary on round-up shows like VH1's The Fabulous Life of... and E!'s True Hollywood Story, Hollywood Wives' Tales and Relatively Famous. In 2010, Murray became a regular expert on the TV One bio series, Life After. He was featured on episodes about Ruben Studdard, Elise Neal, Malcolm-Jamal Warner, Karrine Steffans and Mark Curry.

On January 13, 2011, Murray announced while hosting a showcase for EMI Gospel in Nashville, Tennessee, during the Stellar Awards weekend that he was launching a digital talent competition for 10 unsigned artists for EMI Gospel. The project was called Jawn Murray presents Untapped and Murray was the executive producer for the compilation.

Later that year in 2011, he would announce he was leaving AOL Black Voices following the company's merger with The Huffington Post; as well as departing the Tom Joyner Morning Show. Murray felt as though he had neglected his first love, television, and wanted to focus his interests on opportunities in TV.

In late 2011, the media personality would become a regular fixture on both HLN and CNN. His visibility was increased during the week that Whitney Houston died in 2012, as Murray would appear as a subject matter expert on 21 TV network shows including NBC's Today and multiple series on CNN, HLN, BBC, MSNBC and Fox News. On the day of Houston's funeral, Murray did live commentary for the inaugural episode of MSNBC's Melissa Harris-Perry Show.

In April 2014, Murray co-hosted ABC's The View just two weeks before the show's creator Barbara Walters retired. During the episode, Walters turned to him on live TV and declared: "I love your way with words." He would go on to appear as a panelist on other talk shows like The Meredith Vieira Show and The Wendy Williams Show, and taped numerous episodes on the TV One series Unsung.

He has also gone on to host programming for Travel Channel (Night Crawl New York with Jawn Murray and The Maryland Renaissance Festival), Epix (Top Five: A Red Carpet Special) and NFL Network (NFL Fan Pass: Phoenix.)

In addition to his TV hosting and media endeavors, Murray is also a social media enthusiast influencer that The Huffington Post credits for “catapulting” Kim Kardashian's stardom with a story he penned for AOL Black Voices in 2006. Grey Goose selected him as one of their 2010 "Archetype 25" honorees – 25 people who have carved a chunk in the world for themselves! Don Julio Tequila named him one of Washington, DC's 12 most influential men. In September 2022, Murray joined Sherri as an executive producer and commentator.
