= Ariel (TV series) =

American animated television series

- Also known as: Disney Jr.'s Ariel; Ariel – The Little Mermaid
- Created by: Lynne Southerland
- Inspired by: The Little Mermaid (1989 film); The Little Mermaid (2023 film)
- Voices of: Mykal-Michelle Harris; Taye Diggs; Amber Riley; Elizabeth Phoenix Caro; Cruz Flateau; Gracen Newton; Kai Zen
- Opening theme: "Ariel Main Title Theme", written by Chantry Johnson, Michelle Zarlenga & Rosemarie Tan
- Ending theme: "Making Waves", written by Anthony M. Jones, Olivia Waithe & Sofia Quinn
- Composers: Christopher Willis (score); Sean Skeete (Caribbean music consultant)
- Country of origin: United States
- Original language: English
- No. of seasons: 2
- No. of episodes: 55

Production
- Executive producers: Lynne Southerland; Richard Marlis; Carmen Italia
- Producer: Ezra Edmond
- Running time: 22 minutes (11 minutes per segment)
- Production company: Wild Canary Animation

Original release
- Network: Disney Jr.
- Release: June 27, 2024 – present

Ariel, also known as Disney Jr.'s Ariel and Ariel – The Little Mermaid beginning in its second season, is an American animated television series produced by Wild Canary Animation for Disney Jr. that premiered on June 27, 2024 as part of the Disney Jr. rebranding. The series is inspired by "The Little Mermaid" by Hans Christian Andersen, the 1989 animated film by Walt Disney Animation Studios, and the 2023 live-action remake. The series was renewed for a second season in June 2025. The second season premiered on November 10, 2025.

== Premise ==
Ariel is growing up with her friends in the underwater kingdom of Atlantica. As she attends magic camp taught by her "tauntie Ursula", Ariel goes on a number of adventures, learning about her Caribbean-inspired surroundings and inspiring others with her voice.

== Characters ==
=== Main ===
- Ariel (voiced by Mykal-Michelle Harris) is an 8-year-old mermaid princess of the underwater kingdom of Atlantica.
- King Triton (voiced by Taye Diggs as an adult, Jeremiah Felder as a child) is Ariel's father, Ursula's brother and the king of Atlantica. As a kid, he had the nickname Tri-Tri.
- Ursula (voiced by Amber Riley), a sea witch, Triton's younger sister and Ariel, Alanna and Ayanna's paternal aunt. Unlike the films, Ursula is not antagonistic and has been nicknamed "Tauntie" by Ariel.
  - Ebb and Flo, Ursula's pet moray eels
- Lucia (voiced by Elizabeth Phoenix Caro) is Ariel's friend who is learning to do magic.
- Fernie (voiced by Cruz Flateau) is Ariel's friend who loves learning about animals.
- Flounder (voiced by Gracen Newton) is a fish who is Ariel's friend.
- Akiko (voiced by Kai Zen) is a mermaid who lives in the Crystal World.

=== Recurring ===
- Sebastian (voiced by Kevin Michael Richardson) is a crab, who is the royal composer and one of Ariel's friends. Richardson reprises his role from the Kingdom Hearts video games. (Note: In Episode 13, he takes on the guise of his cousin Henrick.)
- Ravi (voiced by Parvesh Cheena)
- Ayanna (voiced by Dana Heath) is Alanna's twin sister and Ariel's older sister.
- Alanna (voiced by Jessica Mikayla) is Ayanna's twin sister and Ariel's older sister.
- Hermes (voiced by Gary Anthony Williams)
- Jewels (voiced by Amari McCoy) is Ariel, Alanna, and Ayanna's cousin.
- Cristina Cuttles (voiced by Alanna Ubach)
- Clamila (voiced by Somali Rose)
- Delfino (voiced by Ron Funches)
- Navi (voiced by Melissa Villaseñor)
- Bembe (voiced by Madelyn Skyler Tee)
- Wahoo Fish (voiced by Gary Anthony Williams)
- Tauntie Chantale (voiced by Danni Washington) is Triton and Ursula's sister and a marine biologist and Ariel, Alanna and Ayanna's Aunt. As a kid, she had the nickname Chanty.
- Remy (voiced by Ryan Lopez)
- Sanka (voiced by Carlos Alazraqui)
- Ronaldo (voiced by Ayush Rajmachikar)
- Sea Bunnies (voiced by Steve Moore)
- Calamar (voiced by Hunter Corleto)
- Aquatica (voiced by Yvette Nicole Brown)
- Chef Louis (voiced by Yanic Truesdale)
- Axyl (voiced by Martin Wichmann Andersen) is Akiko's pet crystal axolotl.
- Serena Shrimply (voiced by Grey DeLisle)
- Marcel Mahi-Mahi (voiced by John Eric Bentley) is an acrobat fish who, alongside his brother Maurice, is a part of The Marvelous Mahi-Mahi Brothers show.
- Maurice Mahi-Mahi (voiced by John Eric Bentley) is an acrobat fish who, alongside his brother Marcel, is a part of The Marvelous Mahi-Mahi Brothers show.
- Chuckster the Clownfish (voiced by TBA)
- Delroy (voiced by Preston Best) is a pufferfish.
- Miss Patrice (voiced by Yvette Nicole Brown) is Akiko's mother.
- Hoober (voiced by Alvin Joiner)

=== Guest ===
- Squid (voiced by Parvesh Cheena)
- Duke of Clownfish (voiced by Jeff Bennett)
- Revi (voiced by Rizwan Manji)
- Kite Monster (voiced by Kevin Michael Richardson)
- Gabi Guppy (voiced by Abril Bellido)
- Mer-Mom (voiced by Grey DeLisle)
- Gigi Guppy (voiced by Emma Rodriguez)
- Marla (voiced by Alanna Ubach)
- Santa Mer-Claus (voiced by Kevin Michael Richardson)
- Atlanticans (voiced by Gary Anthony Williams & Grey DeLisle)
- Abuelita Alma (voiced by Grey DeLisle)
- Park Attendant (voiced by Jeff Bennett)
- Montez (voiced by Kevin Michael Richardson)
- Nana Xola (voiced by Jenifer Lewis)
- Voice of Manners (voiced by Yvette Nicole Brown)
- Sheila (voiced by Grey DeLisle)
- Duchess of Mariana (voiced by Kimberly Harris)
- Clams (voiced by Jeff Bennett & Grey DeLisle)
- Mer-Kid (voiced by Ayush Rajmachikar)
- Crab (voiced by Grey DeLisle)
- Merman (voiced by Eric Bauza)
- Manuel (voiced by Nicolas Roye) is a manatee.
- Croque Monsieur (voiced by Nich Peltz)
- Moober (voiced by Alvin Joiner)
- Anora (voiced by Alanna Ubach)
- Duke of Arctica (voiced by Jeff Bennett)
- Gerdie (voiced by Charley Rowan McCain)
- Kai (voiced by Miles McNicoll)
- Mr. Pierre (voiced by Jimmy Jean-Louis) is Fernie's father.
- Akira (voiced by Eric Bauza) is Akiko's father.
- Sylvia (voiced by Tara Strong)
- Ms. Mirlande (voiced by Vasthy Mompoint) is Fernie's mother
- Starfish (voiced by Jeff Bennett)
- Carmen (voiced by Vivian Atencio)
- Dolphin (voiced by Eric Bauza)
- Anton (voiced by Steve Moore)
- Pedro (voiced by Ezra Edmond)
- Marina Neptina (voiced by Jodi Benson) is a famous singer.
- Farmer Clarita (voiced by Larissa Dias)
- Whale (voiced by Craig Robinson)
- Rift (voiced by Tara Strong)
- Winston (voiced by Henry Witcher) is a sea dragon.
- Hilda (voiced by Vasthy Mompoint)
- Pearl (voiced by Paris Newton)
- Cuttlefish (voiced by TBA)
- Sea Sniffles (voiced by TBA)
- Manatee (voiced by TBA)
- Lion Fish (voiced by TBA)
- Parrot Fish (voiced by Carlos Alazraqui)
- Merfolk (voiced by Kimberly Harris)
- Audra (voiced by Lucia Arguedas)
- Additional Voices (voiced by Alanna Ubach)
- Car (voiced by Hunter Phillip Corleto)
- Sea Cows (voiced by TBA)
- Sailfish (voiced by TBA)
- Swordfish (voiced by Eric Bauza)
- Puppyfish (voiced by TBA)
- Tica (voiced by TBA)
- Dogfish (voiced by TBA)
- Coral Crab (voiced by TBA)
- Catfish (voiced by TBA)
- Goldfish (voiced by TBA)
- Putterfish (voiced by TBA)
- Stingray (voiced by TBA)
- Tooth Fairy Fish (voiced by TBA)
- Trumpetfish (voiced by TBA)
- Sea Squirts (voiced by TBA)
- Butterfly Fish (voiced by TBA)
- Sea Dragon (voiced by TBA)
- Shrimp (voiced by TBA)
- Eels (voiced by TBA)
- Jellyfish (voiced by TBA)
- Hermit Crab (voiced by TBA)
- Lobsters (voiced by TBA)
- Sea Caterpillar (voiced by TBA)
- Mr. Giant Ancient Dolphin (voiced by TBA)
- Moray Eels (voiced by TBA)
- Fish (voiced by TBA)
- Axolotl (voiced by TBA)
- Ghostfish (voiced by TBA)
- Isopod (voiced by TBA)
- Manity (voiced by TBA)
- Octopus (voiced by TBA)
- Vampire Squid (voiced by TBA)
- X-ray Fish (voiced by TBA)
- Yellowtail Fish (voiced by TBA)
- Zebrafish (voiced by TBA)
- Dolpho (voiced by Daran Norris)
- Giant Squid (voiced by TBA)
- Beardfish (voiced by TBA)
- Angelfish (voiced by TBA)
- Baby Animals (voiced by Paris Newton)
- Sea Witch (voiced by TBA)
- Mermaid (voiced by TBA)
- Merpeople (voiced by TBA)
- Goby (voiced by TBA)
- Atlantica (voiced by TBA)
- La Sirenusca (voiced by TBA)
- Darius the Titlefish (voiced by TBA)
- Maria the Titlefish (voiced by TBA)

== Episodes ==
=== Series overview ===
Season	Episodes	Originally released	
Season	Episodes	First released	Last released
1	30	June 27, 2024	August 22, 2025
2	TBA	November 10, 2025	TBA

=== Season 1 (2024–25) ===
No. overall	No. in season	Title	Directed by	Written by	Storyboarded by	Original release date	Prod. code
1	1	"Atlantica Day"	Kuni Tomita	Keith Wagner	Clint Taylor & Wendy Grieb	June 27, 2024	101
1	1	"A Winner's Spirit"	Steven E. Gordon	Norma P. Sepulveda	Pete Mekis & Rick Farmiloe	June 27, 2024	101
2	2	"Ursula's Magic Camp"	Dan Fraga	Maria Escobedo	Shawna Cha & Wendy Grieb	June 27, 2024	102
2	2	"Fernie's Notebook"	Dan Fraga	Walinase J. Mbekeani	Rafael Rosado, Jordan Koch & Rick Farmiloe	June 27, 2024	102
3	3	"Crystal Cavern Caper"	Steven E. Gordon	Walinase J. Mbekeani	Clint Taylor & Wendy Grieb	June 28, 2024	104
3	3	"A Banner Moment"	Steven E. Gordon	Maria Escobedo	Barry Caldwell	June 28, 2024	104
4	4	"The Endless Sleepover"	Dan Fraga	Keith Wagner	Jordan Koch	July 5, 2024 (Note: These episodes were first released on Disney+ on June 28, 2024.)	105
4	4	"Daddy Daughter Dinner"	Dan Fraga	Walinase J. Mbekeani	Rafael Rosado & Wendy Grieb	July 5, 2024	105
5	5	"Copy Catfish"	Monica Tomova	Maria Escobedo	Robert Souza & Wendy Grieb	July 12, 2024	106
5	5	"Happy Crabby Day"	Monica Tomova	Shawneè & Shawnelle Gibbs	Arthur Valencia & Floyd Norman	July 12, 2024	106
6	6	"Smoothie Shake-Up"	Steven E. Gordon	Norma P. Sepulveda	Pete Mekis & Wendy Grieb	July 19, 2024	107
6	6	"Family Picture Day"	Steven E. Gordon	Walinase J. Mbekeani	Clint Taylor	July 19, 2024	107
7	7	"The Cuttlebaby Sitter"	Dan Fraga	Story by : Halcyon Person; Written by : Maria Escobedo	Rafael Rosado & Wendy Grieb	July 26, 2024	108
7	7	"Flounder the Leader"	Dan Fraga	Joe Purdy	Jordan Koch & Rick Farmiloe	July 26, 2024	108
8	8	"The Clean Team"	Monica Tomova	Keith Wagner	Robert Souza	August 2, 2024	103
8	8	"Clamming Up"	Monica Tomova	Norma P. Sepulveda	Arthur Valencia & Wendy Grieb	August 2, 2024	103
9	9	"The Singing Dolphin"	Steven E. Gordon	Maria Escobedo	Kelly James & Wendy Grieb	August 9, 2024	109
9	9	"The Happy Patty Clap"	Steven E. Gordon	Michelle Calderón	Clint Taylor	August 9, 2024	109
10	10	"Ravi and Navi"	Monica Tomova	Maria Escobedo	Robert Souza	August 16, 2024	111
10	10	"Chef Flounder"	Monica Tomova	Teresa Kale	Arthur Valencia & Wendy Grieb	August 16, 2024	111
11	11	"The Brave Little Goby"	Dan Fraga	Keith Wagner	Jordan Koch	August 30, 2024	110
11	11	"Kid Triton"	Dan Fraga	Walinase J. Mbekeani	Rafael Rosado & Rick Farmiloe	August 30, 2024	110
12	12	"Ariel's Tall Mer-Tale"	Monica Tomova	Keith Wagner	Robert Souza, Rick Farmiloe & Wendy Grieb	September 6, 2024	114
12	12	"Remy, the Houseguest"	Monica Tomova	Walinase J. Mbekeani	Arthur Valencia	September 6, 2024	114
13	13	"La Sirenusca"	Steven E. Gordon	Norma P. Sepulveda	Clint Taylor & George Oliver Holguin	September 30, 2024 (Note: These episodes were first released on Disney+ on September 25, 2024.)	112
13	13	"Substitute Sebastian"	Steven E. Gordon	Walinase J. Mbekeani	Kelly James Givan & Wendy Grieb	September 30, 2024	112
14	14	"The Kite Monster"	Dan Fraga	Norma P. Sepulveda	Rafael Rosado & Wendy Grieb	October 4, 2024	113
14	14	"The Spooky Mirror Trick"	Dan Fraga	Maria Escobedo	Jordan Koch	October 4, 2024	113
15	15	"Fernie's Dra Konfó"	Steven E. Gordon	Monique R. Brandon	Clint Taylor & Wendy Grieb	October 25, 2024	115
15	15	"Lucia, Lucia, Lucia!"	Steven E. Gordon	Michelle Calderón	Kelly James Givan	October 25, 2024	115
16	16	"The Lost Dogfish"	Steven E. Gordon	Maria Escobedo	Clint Taylor & Wendy Grieb	November 8, 2024	118
16	16	"Swim Scouts"	Steven E. Gordon	Michelle Calderón	Kelly James Givan	November 8, 2024	118
The Lost Dogfish: While Ariel, Flounder, Lucia, and Fernie are playing ball, they found a dog fish named Tica and Ariel wants to play with it until they find her. So, she and her friends make pictures to tell everyone in Atlantica to see if they lost Tica, but Ariel keeps playing with Tica instead of finding her family. King Triton tells her it's important to take care of a pet before finding his missing owner. Swim Scouts: Ariel, Lucia, and Flounder are excited about going on a Swim Scouts field trip with Tanti Chantale, they wait for Fernie with his book of fish facts. As soon as he tells them about whales, Tanti Chantale arrives with a new mer-boy Ronaldo from another Swim Scouts group. He tells them all about whales to Fernie. When the field trip begins, Ronaldo gets out his fish facts book and knows all about fish in the sea. Fernie thinks his friends going to be Ronaldo's friend and every time he comes up with a fish fact, Ronaldo jumps in ahead of him. During the last stop Tanti Chantale tells them to look for some starfish. As soon as Fernie finds the starfish, he accidentally gets some on him after startling them. When Ronaldo tries to help unstick them, he swims away. Ariel, Lucia, and Flounder realize that Fernie tells them that they want to play with Ronaldo instead of him and they loved all his fish facts a lot more than his. They told Fernie that they want to make Ronaldo feel welcome and he may know some fish facts but so does Fernie. As soon as they reconcile, Fernie gets Ronaldo to help him by making the starfish get distracted by sand cherries. In the end, Fernie and Ronaldo become best friends.
17	17	"Daddy Daughter Adventure Day"	Dan Fraga	Norma P. Sepulveda	Jordan Koch & Wendy Grieb	November 29, 2024 (Note: These episodes were first released on Disney+ on November 27, 2024.)	119
17	17	"Rainbow Sea Caves"	Dan Fraga	Norma P. Sepulveda	Rafael Rosado	November 29, 2024	119
18	18	"Flounder's Christmas Letter"	Dan Fraga	Walinase J. Mbekeani, Norma P. Sepulveda & Keith Wagner	Jordan Koch & Lincoln Adams	December 2, 2024	116
18	18	"Holiday Toy Box Trouble"	Dan Fraga	Keith Wagner	Rafael Rosado & Wendy Grieb	December 2, 2024	116
19	19	"The Great Big Garden Show"	Kuni Tomita	Maria Escobedo	George Oliver Holguin & Tara Nicole Whitaker	January 10, 2025	120
19	19	"The Sea Sniffles"	Kuni Tomita	Denisse de la Cruz	Arthur Valencia & Wendy Grieb	January 10, 2025	120
20	20	"Razzle Dazzle"	Steven E. Gordon	Maria Escobedo	Kelly James Givan & Wendy Grieb	February 7, 2025	121
20	20	"Fernie's Float"	Steven E. Gordon	Keith Wagner	Clint Taylor & Lincoln Adams	February 7, 2025	121
21	21	"Jewels the Winner"	Dan Fraga	Michelle Calderón	Rafael Rosado	March 7, 2025	122
21	21	"Abuelita's Shawl"	Dan Fraga	Norma P. Sepulveda	Jordan Koch & Wendy Grieb	March 7, 2025	122
22	22	"A Magical Achoo!"	Monica Tomova & Steve Moore	Maria Escobedo	George Oliver Holguin	April 11, 2025	117
22	22	"Are We There Yet?"	Monica Tomova & Steve Moore	Walinase J. Mbekeani, Norma P. Sepulveda & Keith Wagner	Arthur Valencia & Nilah Magruder	April 11, 2025	117
23	23	"Best in Ebb & Flo"	Steven E. Gordon	Maria Escobedo	Kelly James Givan & Wendy Grieb	May 23, 2025	124
23	23	"Me, My Shell, and I"	Steven E. Gordon	Michelle Calderón	Clint Taylor	May 23, 2025	124
24	24	"Picture Perfect Father's Day"	Dan Fraga	Matt Acuña	Jordan Koch & Wendy Grieb	June 6, 2025	125
24	24	"Tantie's Day"	Dan Fraga	Maria Escobedo	Rafael Rosado	June 6, 2025	125
25	25	"Petting Zoo Day"	Steve Moore	Matt Acuña	Arthur Valencia	July 25, 2025	123
25	25	"New Squid in Town"	Steve Moore	Monique R. Brandon	George Oliver Holguin & Lincoln Adams	July 25, 2025	123
26	26	"Family Treasure Hunt"	Steve Moore	Keith Wagner	Arthur Valencia & Wendy Grieb	August 18, 2025	126
26	26	"Remy's Big Feelings"	Steve Moore	Monique R. Brandon	George Oliver Holguin	August 18, 2025	126
27	27	"Fernie's New Discovery"	Steven E. Gordon	Michelle Calderón	Kelly James Givan & Wendy Grieb	August 19, 2025	127
27	27	"Grotto of Manners"	Steven E. Gordon	Michelle Calderón	Clint Taylor	August 19, 2025	127
28	28	"Noodlemania"	Dan Fraga	Maria Escobedo	Rafael Rosado	August 20, 2025	128
28	28	"Super Flounder"	Dan Fraga	Keith Wagner	Jordan Koch & Nilah Magruder	August 20, 2025	128
29	29	"The Magic Wand"	Steve Moore	Norma P. Sepulveda	George Oliver Holguin & Nilah Magruder	August 21, 2025	129
29	29	"Racin' Remy"	Steve Moore	Maria Escobedo	Arthur Valencia	August 21, 2025	129
30	30	"The Glow Crystals"	Steven E. Gordon	Keith Wagner (Part 1)	Kelly James Givan & Nilah Magruder (Part 1)	August 22, 2025	130
30	30	"The Glow Crystals"	Steven E. Gordon	Norma P. Sepulveda (Part 2)	Clint Taylor & Stephen Anderson (Part 2)	August 22, 2025	130

=== Season 2 (2025–26) ===
No. overall	No. in season	Title	Directed by	Written by	Storyboarded by	Original release date	Prod. code
31	1	"The Crystal World"	Dan Fraga	Keith Wagner	Jordan Koch & Stephen Anderson	November 10, 2025	201
31	1	"Magic Octo-Juggle"	Dan Fraga	Denisse de la Cruz	Rafael Rosado	November 10, 2025	201
32	2	"The Little Fins"	Steve Moore	Matt Acuña	Kelly James Givan & Stephen Anderson	November 11, 2025	202
32	2	"The Biggest Land Treasure"	Steve Moore	Teresa Kale	Martin Fuller	November 11, 2025	202
33	3	"Trident Trouble"	Steve E. Gordon	Michelle Calderón	Clint Taylor	November 12, 2025	203
33	3	"Cal's Bright Idea"	Steve E. Gordon	Keith Wagner	Beth Sleven & Stephen Anderson	November 12, 2025	203
34	4	"Flounder's Wishes"	Dan Fraga	Maria Escobedo	Rafael Rosado & Stephen Anderson	November 13, 2025	204
34	4	"Triton's Trip"	Dan Fraga	Michelle Calderón	Jordan Koch	November 13, 2025	204
35	5	"Tiny Tails"	Steve Moore	Maria Escobedo	Martin Fuller & Stephen Anderson	November 14, 2025	205
35	5	"Ariel's Sea Mobile"	Steve Moore	Maria Escobedo	Kelly James Givan	November 14, 2025	205
36	6	"Flounder's Boo Boo"	Steven E. Gordon	Denisse de la Cruz	Beth Sleven	November 21, 2025	206
36	6	"The Marvelous Mahi-Mahi Brothers"	Steven E. Gordon	Matt Acuña	Clint Taylor & Stephen Anderson	November 21, 2025	206
37	7	"A Crystal Christmas"	Dan Fraga	Denisse de la Cruz	Rafael Rosado & Stephen Anderson	December 5, 2025	207
37	7	"The New Year Bubble"	Dan Fraga	Matt Acuña	Jordan Koch	December 5, 2025	207
38	8	"The Chum-ba-Chum"	Steve Moore	Michelle Calderón	Kelly James Givan	January 23, 2026	208
38	8	"Catfish Kerfuffle"	Steve Moore	Keith Wagner	Martin Fuller	January 23, 2026	208
39	9	"Camping Trip"	Steven E. Gordon	Kerri Grant	Beth Sleven & Stephen Anderson	January 30, 2026 (Note: This episode was first released on Disney+ on January 28, 2026.)	209
39	9	"The Lion Fish"	Steven E. Gordon	Aydrea Walden	Clint Taylor	January 30, 2026	209
40	10	"The Write Pencil for the Job"	Dan Fraga	Maria Escobedo	Rafael Rosado	February 6, 2026	210
40	10	"The Crystal Koto"	Dan Fraga	Michelle Calderón	Jordan Koch & Stephanie Alexander	February 6, 2026	210
41	11	"Tomtom for Manman"	Steven E. Gordon	Matt Acuña	Clint Taylor	February 13, 2026	TBA
41	11	"Do the Fernie"	Steven E. Gordon	Kerri Grant	Beth Sleven & Stephanie Alexander	February 13, 2026	TBA
42	12	"Captain Bembé"	Dan Fraga	Maria Escobedo	Rafael Rosado & Stephanie Alexander	March 13, 2026	213
42	12	"Tumbling Tumblekelp"	Dan Fraga	Denisse de la Cruz	Jordan Koch	March 13, 2026	213
43	13	"Detective Flounder"	Steven E. Gordon	Denisse de la Cruz	Beth Sleven	April 10, 2026	TBA
43	13	"Bath Time for Ebb and Flo"	Steven E. Gordon	Senibo Myers	Clint Taylor & Stephanie Alexander	April 10, 2026	TBA
44	14	"The Goldfish"	Dan Fraga	Keith Wagner	Rafael Rosado & Stephanie Alexander	April 17, 2026	214
44	14	"Pufferball!"	Dan Fraga	Michelle Calderón	Jordan Koch	April 17, 2026	214
45	15	"Flounder's Big SurPRIZE!"	Steve Moore	Matt Acuña	Martin Fuller & Jojo Baptista	May 1, 2026	215
45	15	"Lucia's Puppyfish Problem"	Steve Moore	Kerri Grant	Kelly James Givan & Stephanie Alexander	May 1, 2026	215
46	16	"Crystal Ball Playdate"	Steven E. Gordon	Maria Escobedo	Beth Sleven & Stephanie Alexander	June 5, 2026	216
46	16	"Ursula's Special Chariot"	Steven E. Gordon	Denisse de la Cruz	Clint Taylor	June 5, 2026	216
47	17	"Anora the Forgetful Mergician"	Dan Fraga	Keith Wagner	Jordan Koch	June 12, 2026	TBA
47	17	"Freezy Fun"	Dan Fraga	Michelle Calderón	Rafael Rosado & Stephanie Alexander	June 12, 2026	TBA
48	18	"Fadda's Day"	Steve Moore	Michelle Calderón	Kelly James Givan & Stephanie Alexander	June 19, 2026	TBA
48	18	"The Coral Crab"	Steve Moore	Kerri Grant	Martin Fuller	June 19, 2026	TBA
49	19	"Twinspiration"	Kuni Tomita	Matt Acuña	Jojo Baptista & Stephanie Alexander	July 10, 2026	TBA
49	19	"Family Picnic Games"	Kuni Tomita	Maria Escobedo	Kelly James Givan	July 10, 2026	TBA
50	20	"Sylvia's Voice"	Steven E. Gordon	Kerri Grant	Clint Taylor & Stephanie Alexander	July 17, 2026	TBA
50	20	"The Tooth Fairy Fish"	Steven E. Gordon	Denisse de la Cruz	Beth Sleven	July 17, 2026	TBA
51	21	"A Mysterious Machine"	Dan Fraga	Keith Wagner	Rafael Rosado	August 7, 2026	TBA
51	21	"Nature is Magic!"	Dan Fraga	Michelle Calderón	Jordan Koch & Stephanie Alexander	August 7, 2026	TBA
52	22	"Enchanted Dolphin Cove"	Steven Moore & Kuni Tomita	Maria Escobedo (Part 1)	Kelly James Givan & Stephen Anderson (Part 1)	August 21, 2026	TBA
52	22	"Enchanted Dolphin Cove"	Steven Moore & Kuni Tomita	Keith Wagner (Part 2)	Martin Fuller & Stephen Anderson (Part 2)	August 21, 2026	TBA
53	23	"The Red Riptide"	Steve Moore	Matt Acuña	Jojo Baptista & Stephanie Alexander	September 4, 2026	TBA
53	23	"The Great Kelp Cake Bake-Off"	Steve Moore	Kerri Grant	Kelly James Givan	September 4, 2026	TBA
54	24	"Sandcastle Scramble"	Steven E. Gordon	Denisse de la Cruz	Clint Taylor	September 11, 2026	TBA
54	24	"Butterfly Fish"	Steven E. Gordon	Keith Wagner	Beth Sleven & Stephanie Alexander	September 11, 2026	TBA
55	25	"Marina Neptina"	Dan Fraga	Michelle Calderón	Rafael Rosado & Stephanie Alexander	October 9, 2026	TBA
55	25	"The Sea Dragon"	Dan Fraga	Michelle Calderón	Jordan Koch	October 9, 2026	TBA
56	26	"Stop That Shipwreck!"	Steve E. Gordon	Maria Escobedo	Clint Taylor & Stephanie Alexander	November 20, 2026	TBA
56	26	"Hermes' New Shell"	Steve E. Gordon	Maria Escobedo	Beth Sleven	November 20, 2026	TBA
57	27	"A Gift As Good As Gold"	TBA	N/A	N/A	December 11, 2026 (Note: This episode was first released on Disney+ on December 1, 2026.)	TBA
57	27	"Ursula Uh-Oh"	TBA	N/A	N/A	December 11, 2026	TBA

== Short series ==
=== Mermaid Tales ===
No.	Title	Disney+ release date	YouTube/Disney Jr. release date
1	"Ariel's Tail"	June 5, 2024	June 4, 2024 (YouTube); June 5, 2024 (Disney Jr.)
2	"The Quiet Game"	June 5, 2024	June 5, 2024 (Disney Jr.); June 6, 2024 (YouTube)
3	"Palace Puzzle"	June 5, 2024	June 5, 2024 (Disney Jr.); June 6, 2024 (YouTube)
4	"Ariel's Palace Tour"	June 5, 2024	June 6, 2024 (YouTube); June 7, 2024 (Disney Jr.)
5	"The Friendship Smoothie"	June 5, 2024	June 7, 2024 (YouTube); June 10, 2024 (Disney Jr.)
6	"A Fashion Emergency"	June 5, 2024	June 8, 2024 (YouTube); June 11, 2024 (Disney Jr.)
7	"Dress Up Mess Up"	June 5, 2024	June 8, 2024 (YouTube); June 12, 2024 (Disney Jr.)
8	"Magic Breakfast"	June 5, 2024	June 8, 2024 (YouTube); June 13, 2024 (Disney Jr.)
9	"The Silly Trumpetfish"	June 5, 2024	June 8, 2024 (YouTube); June 14, 2024 (Disney Jr.)
10	"Hiccup Gone Amuck"	June 5, 2024	June 8, 2024 (YouTube); June 24, 2024 (Disney Jr.)

=== Songs from the Crystal Cavern ===
No.	Title	Disney+ release date	YouTube/Disney Jr. release date
1	"Crystal World"	August 17, 2025	August 16, 2025 (YouTube); TBA (Disney Jr.)
2	"Glow"	August 17, 2025	August 19, 2025 (YouTube); TBA (Disney Jr.)
3	"In the Mirror"	August 17, 2025	August 21, 2025 (YouTube); TBA (Disney Jr.)
4	"Two is Better Than One"	August 17, 2025	August 22, 2025 (YouTube); TBA (Disney Jr.)
5	"Just My Style"	August 17, 2025	August 23, 2025 (YouTube); TBA (Disney Jr.)
6	"New Friend"	August 17, 2025	August 24, 2025 (YouTube); TBA (Disney Jr.)
7	"Thingamabobs"	August 17, 2025	August 26, 2025 (YouTube); TBA (Disney Jr.)
8	"Imagination"	August 17, 2025	August 28, 2025 (YouTube); TBA (Disney Jr.)
9	"Now We're Cooking"	August 17, 2025	August 30, 2025 (YouTube); TBA (Disney Jr.)
10	"Turn Up the Fun"	August 17, 2025	August 31, 2025 (YouTube); TBA (Disney Jr.)

=== Dolphin Cove Tales ===
No.	Title	Disney+ release date	YouTube/Disney Jr. release date
1	"Dance like a Dolphin"	November 4, 2026	TBA (YouTube); TBA (Disney Jr.)
2	"Dolphin Bedtime"	November 4, 2026	TBA (YouTube); TBA (Disney Jr.)
3	"Dolphin Facts with Fernie"	November 4, 2026	TBA (YouTube); TBA (Disney Jr.)
4	"Magic Watercoloring"	November 4, 2026	TBA (YouTube); TBA (Disney Jr.)
5	"Atlantica ABC's"	November 4, 2026	TBA (YouTube); TBA (Disney Jr.)
6	"Name the Instrument"	November 4, 2026	TBA (YouTube); TBA (Disney Jr.)
7	"Dolphin Park"	November 4, 2026	TBA (YouTube); TBA (Disney Jr.)
8	"The Octo-Clap"	November 4, 2026	TBA (YouTube); TBA (Disney Jr.)
9	"How to Draw Flounder"	November 4, 2026	TBA (YouTube); TBA (Disney Jr.)
10	"Story Time"	November 4, 2026	TBA (YouTube); TBA (Disney Jr.)

== Production ==
During the 2023 Annecy International Animation Film Festival, Disney Branded Television president Ayo Davis announced the development of an animated television series inspired by "The Little Mermaid." The series is produced by Wild Canary in association with Disney Junior. Lynne Southerland serves as executive producer, while Keith Wagner and Norma P. Sepulveda act as story editors. Ezra Edmond is credited as producer, with Kuni Tomita Bowen as supervising director and Chrystin Garland as art director. To ensure cultural authenticity, the production team consulted Dr. Patricia Saunders for cultural supervision and Sean Skeete for guidance on Caribbean music, aiming to accurately represent Caribbean heritage. The songwriting team consists of Tone Jones, Sofia Quinn, and Olivia "Livvi" Waithe. The main cast was announced in August 2023, which included Mykal-Michelle Harris as Ariel, Taye Diggs as King Triton, and Amber Riley as Ursula, among others. The series was renewed for a second season in June 2025.

== Music ==
All credits adapted from Apple Music and Spotify.

=== Singles ===
Year	Title	Album	Writer(s)	Producer(s)
2024	"Shimmer"	Disney Jr. Music: Ariel	Anthony M. Jones, Sofia Quinn, Olivia Waithe	Anthony M. Jones
2024	"Ariel (Theme Song)"	Disney Jr. Music: Ariel	Chantry Johnson, Michelle Zarlenga, Rosemarie Tan	Chantry Johnson

=== Studio albums ===
Title	Details
Disney Jr. Music: Ariel	Released: May 10, 2024; Label: Walt Disney Records; Formats: Digital download, streaming; Track listing: 1. "Ariel (Theme Song)"; 2. "Shimmer"; 3. "Making Waves"; 4. "One Colorful Ocean"; 5. "Zim Zam Bazoo"; 6. "Let Your Music Play"; 7. "So Many Flavors"; 8. "Sebastian's Song"; 9. "Trust in What You Know"; 10. "Enjoy the Ride"

== Release ==
The first trailer for Ariel was released on International Mermaid Day, confirming that Ursula is portrayed as Ariel's aunt and former instructor at a magic camp. The series premiered on Disney Jr. and later aired on Disney Channel on June 27, 2024. The series was subsequently made available for streaming on Disney+. Furthermore, both Ariel and Ariel: Mermaid Tales were released on Disney Now.

In October 2024, Ariel was included in the Disney Junior Cinema Club, a UK-based interactive cinema experience aimed at pre-school audiences. The event featured screenings at select cinemas, including Cineworld, Vue, Odeon, Everyman, and Picturehouse locations. Designed to introduce young children to the big screen, the program combined episodes from Disney Junior series with interactive segments such as songs, games, and dancing. As part of the line-up, Ariel was showcased alongside other titles like Spidey and His Amazing Friends, Bluey, and Winnie the Pooh shorts.

A short series Ariel – The Little Mermaid: Songs from the Crystal Cavern premiered on August 17, 2025 on Disney+.

The second season premiered on November 10, 2025. The season became available to stream on Disney+ on January 28, 2026.

== Reception ==
=== Critical response ===
Caleb Gottry of Plugged In appreciated the Ariel's diverse representation, including Black and Latina characters, and praised its positive portrayal of mixed and same-gender friendships. He emphasized that each episode imparts lessons on patience, responsibility, and forgiveness, and reassured parents that the series is appropriate for young viewers. In his review of the first episode, Gottry found that the segments promote messages about valuing diversity and prioritizing friendship over competition. Ashley Moulton of Common Sense Media gave Ariel a score of five stars out of five and said it offers a fresh take on The Little Mermaid that is suited for young viewers. Moulton found that the series presents gentle challenges and features modest character designs, making it appropriate for preschoolers. She appreciated its focus on positive social-emotional lessons such as celebrating differences, listening to friends, and learning through small steps. Moulton praised Ariel as a strong role model who is kind, proactive, and able to learn from her mistakes. She also complimented the show's celebration of Caribbean cultures through its music, characters, and settings, highlighting its racially diverse cast and inclusive character designs.

=== Accolades ===
Ariel was nominated for Best Animated Television/Media Production for Preschool Children at the 52nd Annie Awards. It also received a nomination for Outstanding Animated Series at the 56th NAACP Image Awards.

The series got two nominations at the Children's and Family Emmy Awards: Outstanding Voice Performer in a Preschool Program for Amber Riley as Ursula and Outstanding Original Song for a Preschool Program for "One Colorful Ocean".

Ariel was nominated for Digital Media at the 2026 NAMIC Vision Awards.

== In other media ==
- Disney Jr.'s Ariel made her debut at Disneyland during the Disney Jr. "Let’s Play! Parade," which took place on D23 Day at Disney California Adventure.
- In August 2024, Disney Publishing Worldwide released a picture book titled Disney Junior Ariel: A Magical Mess.
