= RaeShanda Lias =

American businesswoman, influencer, and activist

- Born: 1981 (age 44–45); Chicago, Illinois
- Education: Kentucky State University
- Occupations: Businesswoman; influencer; activist
- Spouse: Tara Jae (m. 2026)
- Children: 4
- Awards: Human Rights Campaign Influence Award (2025)

RaeShanda Lias (born 1981) is an American businesswoman, influencer, and activist. She has been named to the Ebony Power 100, Out100, and The Root 100, and she received a nomination for a 2025 NAACP Image Award for Outstanding Social Media Personality Of The Year.

== Life and career ==
Lias was born in Chicago and raised in Fayette, Mississippi. She is a mother of four, and had her first child as a teenager. She is a lesbian and came out to her mother when she was 18. She received her bachelor's degree in public administration from Kentucky State University. Lias also served in the United States Army and reached the rank of corporal.

Lias used her army benefits to start a nonprofit in her home state of Mississippi. However, a family member stole all of her savings, approximately $30,000, which led Lias to move to Louisville, Kentucky, with her children. She worked over several months to save up for a house for her family while they experienced homelessness. At the suggestion of one of her followers she shifted into fashion, and opened a clothing boutique, All Is Fair in Love and Fashion.

Lias gained wider prominence for her TikTok videos and the series Let's Check the Board, on which she uses a white board to share rules to live by. Many of her videos are humorous or lighthearted. She uses her platform to support causes such as increasing voter turnout or supporting LGBTQ youth, directing her followers to contribute to mutual aid or mobilize in other ways. She has also collaborated with LGBTQ organizations such as the Human Rights Council.

In 2025 she was nominated for a NAACP Image Award for Outstanding Social Media Personality of the Year.

== Personal life ==
Lias married her partner, Tara Jae, in 2026. The ceremony was officiated by Niecy Nash-Betts and Jessica Betts. Lias resides in Louisville with her partner.

== Accolades ==
- 2025 – Honoree, Ebony Power 100 (Influential Creators)
- 2025 – Winner, HRC Influence Award
- 2025 – Nominee, NAACP Image Award for Outstanding Social Media Personality of the Year
- 2025 – Honoree, Out100
- 2025 – Honoree, The Root 100
