= Diane Oliver =

African-American writer (1943–1966)

- Born: Diane A. Oliver; July 28, 1943; Charlotte, North Carolina, U.S.
- Died: May 21, 1966 (aged 22); Iowa City, Iowa, U.S.
- Education: West Charlotte High School; University of North Carolina at Greensboro; University of Iowa's Writers' Workshop
- Occupation: Writer
- Notable work: "Neighbors" and Other Stories

Diane A. Oliver (July 28, 1943 – May 21, 1966) was an American short fiction writer. She published four short stories in her lifetime and a further ten posthumously, eight of those only seeing print nearly 58 years after her death. Oliver's writing reflected her experiences growing up in the African-American middle class of Charlotte, North Carolina, in the 1940s and 1950s.

== Life and career ==
Diane Oliver was born on July 28, 1943, in Charlotte, North Carolina, United States. Her father, William Oliver, was a schoolteacher and her mother, Blanche Rann, was a piano teacher. After attending segregated public schools in Charlotte, she graduated from West Charlotte High School in 1960 and the University of North Carolina at Greensboro (then known as Women's College of the University of North Carolina) in 1964. Oliver served as managing editor of The Carolinian, the Women's College student newspaper.

She entered the University of Iowa's Writers' Workshop in 1965. Oliver was one of only two African American writers to study at the Workshop in that era, along with John Edgar Wideman.

In the summer of 1964, Oliver participated in Mademoiselle magazine's summer guest editor program for female students, whose alumni also included Sylvia Plath and Joan Didion. "Key to the City" became her first published short story, appearing in Red Clay Reader in 1965, followed by "Health Service" in the November 1965 issue of Negro Digest. In 1966, Oliver saw her most acclaimed work, "Neighbors", appear in The Sewanee Review, and "The Closet on the Top Floor" was included in Southern Writing in the Sixties: Fiction, an anthology.

Oliver died in a motorcycle accident on May 21, 1966, in Iowa City, Iowa. The University of Iowa conferred her Master of Fine Arts degree posthumously the following month. At the time of her death, she had received relatively little recognition as an author, but obituaries were published by both Negro Digest and Jet. "Neighbors" was awarded an O. Henry Prize in 1967.

== Posthumous publications and recognition ==
Two other stories completed by Oliver prior to her death, "Traffic Jam", and "Mint Juleps Not Served Here", were posthumously published in Negro Digest in July 1966 and March 1967, respectively. For decades afterwards, these were thought to be her only remaining works.

In 2022, a British literary agent familiar with Oliver's extant writings contacted her sister Cheryl to inquire whether any additional writings by Oliver existed. After sifting through boxes of material stored since the author's death, eight new unpublished stories were uncovered. Cheryl suggested that her sister "wrote about family members and friends, to the point that my mother did not want her to publish some of the stories, because there could be a lot of problems," but noted that her mother had nonetheless saved all of Oliver's existing material following her daughter's death. The literary agent Elise Dillsworth was hired to represent Diane Oliver's etate, and Oliver's expanded collected works were published in a volume by Grove Press as "Neighbors" and Other Stories in February of 2024.

The release of Oliver's collected works attracted new attention to her career in major American and international publications. Reviews praised the quality of her writing, also widely citing her death at the age of 22 as a loss to American literature. The Guardian considered the new stories "of varying quality", but that they "hint at the greatness the author might have achieved". The Washington Post similarly called the book "a glimpse of what should have been a promising career".

== Bibliography ==
=== Short fiction ===
- "Key to the City" in Red Clay Reader II (1965).
- "Health Service" in Negro Digest, vol. 15, no. 1 (November 1965), 72–79.
- "Neighbors" in The Sewanee Review, vol. 74, no. 2 (Spring 1966), 470–88.
- "The Closet on the Top Floor" in Southern Writing in the Sixties: Fiction, edited by John William Corrington & Miller Williams, Baton Rouge: Louisiana State University Press, 1966.
- "Traffic Jam" in Negro Digest, vol. 15, no. 9 (July 1966), 69–78.
- "Mint Juleps Not Served Here" in Negro Digest, vol. 16, no. 5 (March 1967), 58–66.

=== Collected short fiction ===
- "Neighbors" and Other Stories, New York: Grove Atlantic, 2024.
