= Nickelodeon HALO Awards =

Yearly TV special

- Awarded for: Teens making a difference in their community to help people in need.
- Country: United States
- Presented by: Nick Cannon
- First award: 2009
- Final award: 2017
- Website: http://www.teennick.com/shows/halo-awards

Television/radio coverage
- Network: TeenNick (2009-2017) Nickelodeon (2014-2017) Nicktoons (2014-2017)
- Runtime: about 60 minutes
- Produced by: Nickelodeon Productions

The Nickelodeon HALO Awards was a yearly TV special that aired originally on TeenNick but later expanded to Nickelodeon and Nicktoons in its final years. Usually aired every December, the awards profiled five ordinary teens who are Helping And Leading Others (HALO). Created by chairman Nick Cannon, the show was similar to other awards shows, such as CNN's Heroes award. The ceremony ended after its 2017 iteration, due to budget cuts to TeenNick that left it without any original programming.

== Premise ==
The HALO Awards "...flips the script and features today’s biggest celebrities giving out the awards instead of receiving them,” said Marjorie Cohn, Executive Vice President, Original Programming and Development of Nickelodeon. It profiled five teens who were usually seniors in high school or have just started college, that sacrificed themselves to better the lives of others.

== Prize ==
Each teen is presented with usually $10,000 to further their education, another sum for their own charity or in cases where the teen does not have their own charity, they have the option of giving it to the charity of their choice. On top of that, they get to spend time with a celebrity who shares their passion. Also they work together to help others with their passion.

== The Premiere of the Halo Awards ==
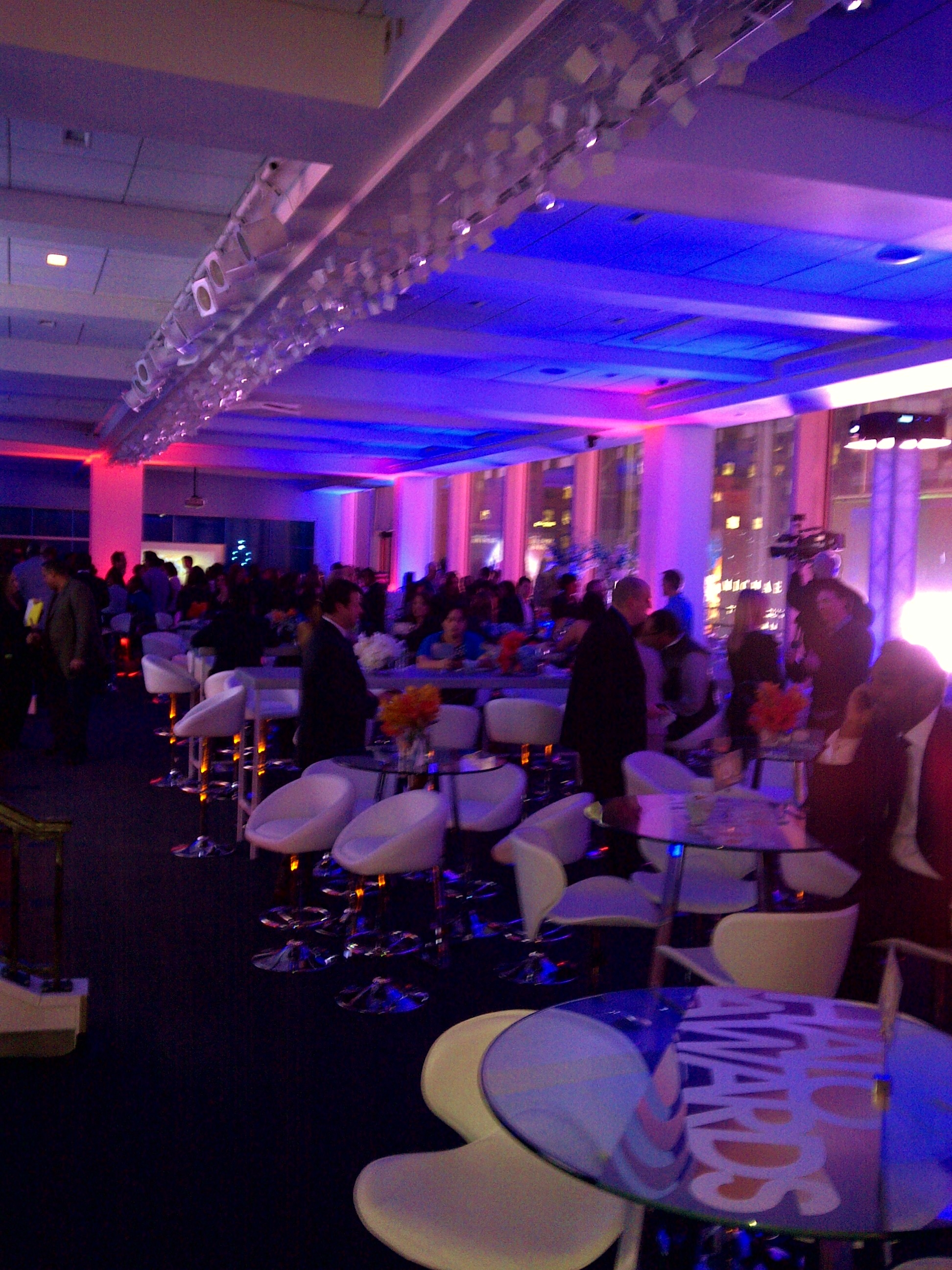
Inside the premiere screening of the 2010 HALO Awards

There was a special screening premiere of the HALO Awards that was held a few days before the national premiere of that years awards. It is an invitation only event. All the honorees are flown to the chosen city and get to meet each other for the first time. Among the attendees are the honorees families and close friends. Many celebrities also attended. Among the celebrities that attended the previous screenings include Brad Kavanagh, Jerry Trainor, Nathalia Ramos, Jade Ramsey, Matt Shively, Mary J. Blige, Heidi Klum, Jason Derulo and Serena Williams. In previous years, the premiere was held in New York City, Los Angeles and in Washington DC.

For the 3rd Annual HALO Awards, in October 2011, Nickelodeon announced that the HALO Awards would air on Nick at Nite on November 6, 2011. It was filmed a few days earlier at the Hollywood Palladium.

== The HALO Effect ==
The HALO Effect was a spinoff TV series that aired on Nickelodeon in January 2016 and was hosted by Sydney Park. The concept of the show revolved around having an episode dedicated to a teen doing good in their community.

== Other links ==
- Miss Amazing Official Website
- DNA Foundation
- 2010 Celebrity Guests
