= Gracie's Corner =

- Title card
- Genre: Children's television series
- Created by: Javoris Hollingsworth, Arlene Gordon-Hollingsworth, and Graceyn Hollingsworth
- Starring: Graceyn Hollingsworth

Original release
- Network: YouTube
- Release: 2020 – present

Gracie's Corner is a children's cartoon musical series featuring Gracie, a young Black girl singing songs. The series has been hosted on YouTube since 2020 and also premiered on Disney Jr. on June 15, 2026 in the United States.

== Creation ==
During the COVID-19 pandemic, professors Javoris Hollingsworth and Arlene Gordon-Hollingsworth from Houston, Texas noticed there was lack of racial diversity in young children's entertainment, especially for children under six. Their daughter Graceyn wanted to start a YouTube channel, and out of caution for her online safety, Javoris and Arlene decided to make an animated program.

Hollingsworth had been working as an organic chemistry professor, but left his job in order to write for and produce the program. He also writes the music, with a focus on making songs that are similar to what the children might hear in the car with their parents. Some of the ideas for content come from Gordon-Hollingsworth, a psychologist. Graceyn Hollingsworth voices Gracie.

== Program ==
Gracie's Corner features "culturally relevant remixes to old time nursery rhymes" and new songs.

Several of the videos draw from Black culture. For example, in "The Phonics Song," Gracie wears an ancient Egyptian sheath dress, and in "Count to 100" she wears a full HBCU marching band uniform. "Bingo (Second Line Remix)" features a New Orleans-style Second line.

Musicians such as Snoop Dogg, Paul Wall, Charlie Wilson, 2Rare, and Big Freedia have appeared on the program.

== Awards ==
- 2025: Nominations, NAACP Image Awards for Outstanding Children's Program, Animated Series, and Performance by a Youth (Series, Special, Television Movie or Limited Series)
- 2024: The 50 Most Powerful Players in Kids Entertainment, Hollywood Reporter
- 2024: NAACP Image Award for Outstanding Children's Program
- 2023: Nomination, NAACP Image Awards for Outstanding Animated Series
- 2023: Nomination, Kids' Choice Awards for Favorite Female Creator
- 2023: Nomination, Streamy Awards for Kids and Family
