= Good Morning Today =

Animated television show

- Created by: David Javerbaum
- Voices of: Allan Trautman; Donna Kimball; Kristin Charney
- Country of origin: United States
- No. of seasons: 1
- No. of episodes: 20

Production
- Executive producers: Lisa Henson; David Javerbaum; Alex Bulkley; Corey Campodonic
- Production companies: The Jim Henson Company; ShadowMachine Films

Original release
- Network: Fusion
- Release: October 28, 2013 – April 7, 2014

Good Morning Today is an animated television show on Fusion that was created by David Javerbaum and produced by The Jim Henson Company under its Henson Alternative banner and ShadowMachine Films. The show uses The Jim Henson Company's real time motion capture Digital Puppet Studio.

== Plot ==
The plot details an alternate universe's favorite morning news show in New York City which is run by Rilcardo Gomez, Cathy Smiith, Flo Qwan, and Krish Goldstein. In addition, episodes features live-action celebrity interviews where they improvise the variations of their own lives.

== Characters ==
- Rilcardo Gomez (motion captured by Tony Sabin Prince, voiced by Allan Trautman) – He is the anchorman on Good Morning Today.
- Cathy Smith (motion captured by John Munro Cameron, voiced by Donna Kimball) – She is the anchorwoman on Good Morning Today.
- Flo Qwan (motion captured by John Munro Cameron, voiced by Kristin Charney) – She is the senior reporter on Good Morning Today.
- Krish Goldstein (motion captured by Tony Sabin Prince, voiced by Allan Trautman) – He is the roving junior reporter on Good Morning Today. He is the host of the segment "Can You Geographically Situate Krish Goldstein" where Cathy and Flo had to guess where Krish is situated.

== Episodes ==
1. Episode 1 (October 28, 2013) – Chris Hardwick is interviewed about the Twitter Tech. Internet videos are made of insects. Riots occur in Norway revolving around the release of Thor: The Dark World.
2. Episode 2 (November 28, 2013) – The team covers the 87th Annual Gimble's Thanksgiving Day Parade as they talk with the parade's balloon master Danny Trejo and children's television host Conan O'Brien.
3. Episode 3 (December 13, 2013) – Minnesota becomes the 12th state to legalize lesbian marriage much to the objection of the Northboro Baptist Church. Diablo Cody is interviewed by Flo Qwan about writing the new Star Wars movie. Krish visits Pyongyang, North Korea.
4. Episode 4 (December 20, 2013) – Barack Obama searches for the perfect pen which took eight hours and had accidentally signs a bill that allows child slavery. Rilcardo Gomez interviews the Daniel Stutzman about the "Bay of Pigs" liberation battle during the invasion on Cuba which toppled Fidel Castro in the 1960s. The movie Captain Phillips is criticized by Captain Phillips' crew and the Somali pirate's Cap'n Agbaal (whose interview transmission to Rilcardo is an undisclosed location) for not depicting the Somali Pirate's side of the story. Teenagers have been enlisting in the war video game The Invasion of Syria.
5. Episode 5 (December 27, 2013) – Wall Street investors take interest in "Cats 4 Cats" (which enables people to adopt homeless cat). Krish Goldstein reports at O'Hare International Airport where an airplane called Flight 468 is running 30 minutes late and suspects that terrorism is involved. The 150th anniversary of the Gettysburg Address is celebrated. Cathy Smiith and Tevon Hadley do Celebrity Gossip revolving around Brad Pitt and Jennifer Aniston expecting their fourth child, John Travolta and Marie Osmond's relationship are "on the rocks," Jon Hamm's extreme weight loss, and the cast of Dawson's Creek are reuniting.
6. Episode 6 (January 3, 2014) – The 2016 presidential election will be coming sooner than anyone thinks. Princess Jennifer Love Hewitt is having a baby as Rilcardo and Cathy discuss with Senior Monaco Correspondent Marc Duchaine about the name of Princess Jennifer Love Hewitt's baby. Samantha Wilson gives Cathy household tips involving recycling previously used stuff. Krish Goldstein visits Atlantis.
7. Episode 7 (January 10, 2014) – Emancipated women held in hostage within Milan are finally released. Rilcardo interviews Rich Eisen about the occurrences during the mid-season football games. Flo's report on a storm is disrupted by Rilcardo and Cathy's strange talents. A major security breach occurs on Ask.com. Krish does a public service announcement about catfishing on the Internet.
8. Episode 8 (January 17, 2014) – Funeral services were held by Sal Milanese who invented oral sex. Peter Kim of the NSA and Flo Qwan answers questions to the viewers on "Ask the NSA." The pictures of the theater that will be showing "Fifty Shades of Grey" are shown. Footage of the GMT cast dancing during the commercial is shown. Cathy Smiith talks with Tara St. Claire (the Senior Beauty Editor of "The Economist") about the latest beauty trends revolving around Rosacea.
9. Episode 9 (January 24, 2014) – A deadly leaf-slide occurs in Vermont. Rilcardo Gomez introduces Sir Alfred Yankovic. Typhoon Haiyan causes a disaster in the Philippines as Krish Goldstein reports about it. Rilcardo does a public service announcement about giving kids food to help them grow.
10. Episode 10 (January 31, 2014) – Flo Qwan reports on Hugh Hefner's retirement for Playboy. Cathy Smiith interviews Patrick Mitchell about his scallion abuse. Rilcardo Gomez talks to David Peck (the head of the American Council for Christian Values) about the Christian Coalition about harshly condemning the Obama administration in a full-page ad. The Selfie Awards are coming up as Cathy and Flo give people advice on how to pull off the best selfie pictures.
11. Episode 11 (February 7, 2014) – Flo Qwan reports about National Awareness Day. Rilcardo Gomez and Cathy Smiith looks forward to Tyler Perry's Ender's Game, Gigli 2, and The Goldfish Contingency. Cathy Smiith interviews Katie Morgan. Doctors have upgraded Donald Trump's medical condition following his ambush by three men as Krish Goldstein reports about it outside NYU Hospital. Flo Qwan does a public service announcement where she tells kids to stay in school.
12. Episode 12 (February 14, 2014) – Flo Qwan reports about this year's Black Friday being the most philanthropic. A Missouri man loses money on a Mega Millions ticket when trying to obtain money for his granddaughter's gift. Cathy Smiith does a public service announcement about saving the environment. Cathy interviews Brian Baumgartner about how he became the "Sexiest Man Alive." Krish Goldstein reports about Tom Cruise's latest project Escape from Scientology which is being filmed in Clearwater, Florida.
13. Episode 13 (February 18, 2014) – Flo Qwan reports that the War on Warming is not occurring until 3064. Cathy Smiith interviews Wedding Planner Marsha DeNatale who gives people wedding tips. Krish Goldstein visits Legoland. Rilcardo Gomez shows Adorable Baby Plants on the Internet to draw Cathy out of her depression of the War of Christmas.
14. Episode 14 (February 24, 2014) – Flo Qwan reports that the War on Warming continues that involved changing your Facebook picture to Earth to support environmentalism. Flo interviews Tony Hawk about his undercover job. Cathy and Flo reports about Emmy Rossum's Yorkshire Terrier Cinnamon appearing in public with only a sweater and no pants. Cathy and Tevon Hadley discuss Celebrity Gossip revolving around Chris Kirkpatrick's fourth solo hit, Sandra Bullock announcing her involvement in Martin Scorsese's remake of Grease, and Alan Rickman returns with "Rickman Knows Best."
15. Episode 15 (March 3, 2014) – Today is National Marijuana Day as Rilcardo Gomez and Cathy Smiith smoke marijuana footage where they act high during some stories. Flo Qwan reports on the breaking news about the crew members of "Good Morning Today" being controlled by puppeteers in another dimension. Krish Goldstein interviews Kimberly Wilson about the Yoga fad. Rilcardo runs the 90 Second Challenge with a phone contestant on when it has been 90 seconds. Flo reports on a massive scallion bust.
16. Episode 16 (March 10, 2014) – The UN Weapon Inspectors have been thwarted in his search for the nuclear weapons. The anniversary of Elvis Presley's death is honored as Rilcardo Gomez interviews his wife Fatima al-Qashir. Flo Qwan announced Ben & Jerry's Death Panel Pistachio flavor as they oppose Barack Obama. Cathy Smith interviews Fabio Viviani who is making a dish called "broken glass." The Johnstone Family have come home from the hospital with twin babies.
17. Episode 17 (March 17, 2014) – Rilcardo Gomez returns after recovering from Wandering Face Syndrome. Al Gore will be in Nashville, Tennessee to open up the Al Gore Library. The Department of Labor reports of the raise of unemployment. Rilcardo Gomez talks with Neil deGrasse Tyson about the Multiverse and yo-yos. Cathy Smith reports on Tom Hanks' meltdown on Saturday Night Live. Flo Qwan reports that waiters Julie Yost and Matthew Kroeger were discovered to be long-lost siblings.
18. Episode 18 (March 24, 2014) – The viral video of a mother singing to her baby son is shown as the baby laughs at the arguing parents. Flo Qwan reports about Senator Bob Corker's Narkling Scandal and about the preparations for Gonorrhea Season are made. Krish Goldstein reports about the volcano eruptions in Kansas. Flo talks to Fusion Anchor and witchcraft practitioner Julie Ghoulson about Halloween.
19. Episode 19 (March 31, 2014) – A Senior White Official has apologized to Congress about what happened to Obamaporn. Cathy Smith interviews Patrick Mitchell about his "Milk the Cow" yo-yo technique. Rilcardo Gomez and Cathy Smith looks forward to Tyler Perry's Ender's Game, Gigli 2, and The Goldfish Contingency.
20. Episode 20 (April 7, 2014) – Flo Qwan reports that this winter's weather in the Arctic Circle has left some ice flows for polar bears to be on. Peter Kim of the NSA and Flo Qwan answers questions to the viewers on "Ask the NSA." Cathy Smith and Dr. Wilma Frank give sex advice. Krish Goldstein is held hostage somewhere.

== Cast ==
=== Motion capture performers ===
- John Munroe Cameron – Cathy Smiith, Flo Qwan
- Tony Sabin Prince – Rilcardo Gomez, Krish Goldstein

=== Voices ===
- Allan Trautman – Rilcardo Gomez, Krish Goldstein
- Donna Kimball – Cathy Smiith
- Kristin Charney – Flo Qwan

=== Special guest stars ===
- Jordan Black – Cap'n Agbaal
- Brian Baumgartner – Himself
- Diablo Cody – Herself
- Drew Droege – Tevon Hadley
- Rich Eisen – Himself
- Chris Hardwick – Himself
- Tony Hawk – Himself
- John Michael Higgins – Reverend Jeremiah Phelps
- Ken Jeong – Peter Kim
- Patrick Mitchell – Himself
- Katie Morgan – Herself
- Conan O'Brien – Himself
- Mindy Sterling – Dr. Wilma Frank
- Danny Trejo – Himself
- Neil deGrasse Tyson – Himself
- Fabio Viviani – Himself
- Fred Willard – Daniel Stutzman
- "Weird Al" Yankovic – Sir Alfred Yankovic

=== Guest stars ===
- Carlos Alazraqui – Marc Duchaine
- Brigette Davidovici – Kimberly Wilson
- Teresa Ganzel – Fatima al-Qashir
- Kate Huffman – Julie Ghoulson
- Tom Kenny – David Peck
- Kelly Landry – Tara St. Claire
- Lisa Schurga – Samantha Wilson
- Jill Talley – Marsha DeNatale
