= Tardio =

Tardio is a surname. Notable people with the surname include:

- Chris Tardio (born 1973), American actor and writer
- Gabriel Tardio (born 2005), Bolivian professional pickleball player
- Luis Tardio (born 2009), Peruvian & Honduran Brazilian Funk Producer
