= Lil Kev =

American adult animated television series

- Genre: Adult animation; Animated sitcom
- Created by: Matthew Claybrooks; Michael Price
- Voices of: Kevin Hart; Wanda Sykes; Slink Johnson; Deon Cole
- Country of origin: United States
- Original language: English
- No. of seasons: 1
- No. of episodes: 10

Production
- Executive producers: Matthew Claybrooks; Michael Price; Eric Goldberg; Peter Tibbals; Alex Bulkley; Corey Campodonico; Kevin Hart; Jason Harvey; Rose Catherine Pinkey
- Producers: Eleanor Winkler; JC Del Barco II; Toy Monique Hawkins; David Ichioka; Allison Morse
- Editor: Joe Gressis
- Running time: 22–minutes
- Production companies: Standing Room Only! Productions; King of France Productions; ShadowMachine; HartBeat Productions

Original release
- Network: BET+
- Release: March 6, 2025
- Network: Paramount+

Lil Kev is an American adult animated television series created by Matthew Claybrooks and Michael Price.

On October 16, 2026, it was announced that the series was renewed for a second season, which is set to premiere on Paramount+ on December 9, 2026.

== Synopsis ==
Set in 1993 North Philadelphia, the series follows 12-year-old Kevin Hart, whose wild imagination and unshakable optimism constantly collide with his neighborhood’s harsh realities.

== Characters ==
=== Main ===
- Kevin Darnell "Kev" Hart (voiced by himself) is the 12-year-old younger animated version of the person with the same name. His confidence, imagination and constant daydreaming drive him to attempt insanely lofty goals, most of which he fails at miserably.
- Nancy Hart (voiced by Wanda Sykes) is Kevin and Robert's overprotective and busy mother. She works at the hospital as a nurse. She's also intimidating, quick to ass-whooping, and God-fearing. she works hard to pay the bills and put food on the table.
- Henry Hart (voiced by Slink Johnson) is Nancy's ex-husband and Kevin and Robert's father. He had a troubled past tainted by addiction, which caused his vices to doom his relationship with Nancy.
- Uncle Richard Jr. (voiced by Deon Cole) is Nancy's younger brother and Kevin and Robert's parental uncle. He tries his best to stay clear of the crime scene because he respects his family and deep down is a little scared of his big sister.

=== Recurring ===
- Robert Hart (voiced by Jamar Neighbors) is Kev's 16-year-old “glass half-empty” older brother (who calls him “Negative Ned”). Robert is a hustler who's all about making cash money.
- Rhe Rhe (voiced by Wé Ani) is the object of Kevin's affection. Rhe Rhe is super cute, super sweet, and super smart. She's never received anything lower than an A on her report card. Her goal is to be a brain surgeon one day.
- Omar & Darnell (voiced by Jayden Libran & Affion Crockett) are Uncle Richard Jr.'s boys from prison. Omar met his cellmate Darnell, and then became lovers, though they most definitely do not fit the stereotype of gay men.
- Chin-Check (voiced by Justin Hires) is Kevin's arch-nemesis and the school bully. Chin Check robs people for sport and he chin checks fools as a form of greeting, as his name implies. Chin Check struggles with a learning disabilityand is just starting to learn how to read.

== Episodes ==
=== Season 1 (2025) ===
No.	Title	Written by	Original release date
1	"Take Your Kev to Work"	Matthew Claybrooks & Michael Price	March 6, 2025
When Kev's altercation with Chin-Check sparks a riot in North Philly, Nancy takes him to the E.R., where she works to scare him straight.
2	"Kev the Babysitter"	Rob Haze	March 6, 2025
Kev's plan to go to Rhe Rhe's party is thwarted when he gets stuck babysitting Uncle Richard Jr's two rowdy kids.
3	"Laugh at My 'Paign"	Eric Goldberg & Peter Tibbals	March 6, 2025
When the community pool closes, smooth-talking city council candidate Coleman Bridges proves unhelpful, so Kev schemes for Henry to run against Coleman.
4	"Mr. Uncle Mom Jr."	Tyree Elaine	March 6, 2025
Uncle Richard is put in charge of the boys while Nancy takes a risk visiting a new hair salon; when Kev and Robert's troublemaking plans go awry, Richard and Henry clean up the mess.
5	"Driving Miss Nancy Crazy"	Henry Gammill	March 6, 2025
Inspired by Rev. Mooney's sermon, Kev and Nancy try to prove each other wrong as they help their racist elderly neighbor; Richard thinks Miss Green is avoiding him.
6	"Trial and Terror"	Marlena Rodriguez	March 6, 2025
Kev's class completes a read-a-thon challenge, but when their progress logbook is stolen, it puts their pizza party at risk, so the class holds a mock trial to catch the thief.
7	"The King and Queen of Harts Play Spades"	Angel Weaver	March 6, 2025
Nancy and Henry head to Baltimore to reclaim their Spades glory from years past, and Kev gets nervous when he attracts the attention of a girl.
8	"This Isn't 39"	Chris Cobb	March 6, 2025
When Nancy goes out with her friend Loretta for one last crazy night before she turns 40, Kev and Henry trail them to keep Nancy away from other men.
9	"Bittersweet Charity"	Matthew Claybrooks & Michael Price	March 6, 2025
When Nancy watches after Dirty Dante, Kev takes advantage of his mother's distraction to stay out late, and Richard suspects Miss Green is losing interest in him.
10	"Sink or Swim"	Jeff Norkin & Nadine Mahasneh	March 6, 2025
Kev starts a swim team with a glum new kid in town, and Nancy's dinner party for Coleman goes off the rails when surprise guests crash the dinner.

== Production ==
Lil Kev was conceived when executive producer and star Kevin Hart sought out television writers to adapt his early stand-up material and 1990s childhood in North Philadelphia into an adult animated sitcom, where Claybrooks and Price were independently selected and subsequently formed a writing partnership to anchor the project.

The series began development in 2016. By 2017, executive producer Jeff Clanagan and Hart's company, Hartbeat Productions, released a short digital proof of concept on Facebook and YouTube to gauge audience reactions.

The series faced a prolonged development process, which the show originally was pitched to Fox Broadcasting Company in 2018, before not being passed for a full series by the network. It also navigated multiple script iterations, structural overhauls, and pitch cycles across several networks before finally securing a direct-to-series order from BET+. During periods of potential cancellation, Claybrooks was credited with actively maintaining the project’s momentum.

Principal animation began well ahead of the premiere, with active production stretching from a year and 1 month, from October 2023 through November 2024. The physical production was led by executive producers Alex Bulkley and Corey Campodonico of the West Hollywood-based studio ShadowMachine, known for its work on shows like the first five seasons of Robot Chicken and BoJack Horseman. The overseas animation services were provided by Toon City in Manila, Philippines, where the animation team intentionally designed a hand-drawn aesthetic utilizing distinct, inky lines and layered, painterly background textures meant to contrast with traditional digital animation styles.
