= Roye Okupe =

Nigerian filmmaker, digital animator, and writer

- Education: George Washington University
- Occupations: Filmmaker; Author
- Years active: 2015–present
- Children: 1

Roye Okupe is a Nigerian–American filmmaker and author. He is best known as the creator, showrunner, and executive producer of the fantasy animated series Iyanu. He is the creator of afro-futuristic superhero franchise E.X.O.: The Legend of Wale Williams, the historical-fantasy graphic novel series Malika: Warrior Queen and the fantasy graphic novel Iyanu: Child of Wonder.

Okupe is the founder of YouNeek Studios, a multimedia company dedicated to developing African-inspired comic books, graphic novels, and animated content.

== Early life and education ==
Okupe was born and raised in Lagos, Nigeria. He was introduced to animation at an early age and frequently watched animated series such as Teenage Mutant Ninja Turtles, Batman, and X-Men. In 2002, he moved to the United States, where his proximity to the animation industry contributed to his interest in creating work that incorporated elements of his Nigerian background.

He studied computer science at George Washington University, earning a bachelor's degree in 2007 and a master's degree in 2009. He also completed an animation course at the Art Institute of Washington.

== Career ==
Okupe began his career working as a web developer in Greenbelt, Maryland. While employed, he produced an eight-minute animated trailer introducing his first superhero character Wale Williams, the protagonist of E.X.O. (Endogenic Xoskeletal Ordnance). After unsuccessful attempts to secure industry backing for an animated project, Okupe shifted his focus to comic-book production, which he identified as more feasible to develop independently.

In 2015, Okupe left his job and began self-publishing comic books to introduce his characters. He established YouNeek Studios and funded operations through personal savings, crowdfunding campaigns, and online sales. His publications were developed in collaboration with several African artists and colorists. The works drew on African settings, historical elements, and contemporary themes. On August 31, 2015, he released YouNeek Studio's first title, E.X.O.: The Legend of Wale Williams. The 136-page graphic novel set in a futuristic Nigeria and follows Wale Williams, who obtains a technologically advanced Nanosuit while investigating his father's disappearance. A test pilot was produced to explore the property's potential for adaptation into animation. The project was nominated for Best Animated Short at the Africa International Film Festival and YouNeek Studios released the second part of its three-part animation series in connection with the nomination.

In 2016, Okupe later expanded the YouNeeK YouNiverse with Malika: Warrior Queen, a historical fantasy set in 15th-century West Africa. The series introduces a warrior queen whose story functions as a foundational narrative within the shared universe and connects to characters and events in Okupe’s previous work, E.X.O.: The Legend of Wale Williams. The first part of the series was published by YouNeek Studios, accompanied by an art book titled WindMaker: The History of Atala, which serves as a companion to Malika: Warrior Queen and draws from West African mythology. Further volumes, including the second part of Malika, were prepared through additional crowdfunding campaigns.

In 2018, Okupe advanced an animated adaptation of Malika: Warrior Queen, releasing a two-minute teaser for the project. To support production of a full episode, YouNeek Studios launched a crowdfunding campaign. The adaptation formed part of broader efforts to increase African representation in animated media, with Malika positioned as a central female-led narrative within the YouNeek YouNiverse. In 2019, he released a new trailer for the animated adaptation of Malika: Warrior Queen, featuring voice performances from Nigerian actors including Adesua Etomi. The project was presented at the 8th Annual Lagos Comic Convention and 6th Annual MECCAcon in Detroit, Michigan.

In 2021, Okupe signed an exclusive agreement with Dark Horse Comics to publish ten YouNeek titles. Dark Horse Comics announced that it had acquired the rights to republish YouNeek Studios' existing titles and to publish new works from the company. The agreement positioned three YouNeek titles—Malika: Warrior Queen, Iyanu: Child of Wonder, and E.X.O.: The Legend of Wale Williams—for release through Dark Horse, with scheduled publication dates of September 7, September 21, and October 19, respectively. All books were written by Okupe and illustrated by a team of African artists. Dark Horse representatives noted their interest in supporting stories developed by African creative teams. Okupe emphasized that retaining control of his intellectual property was an important aspect of the partnership and expressed interest in the possibility of future adaptations.

In August 2022, Dark Horse Comics and Okupe announced an expansion of their publishing partnership, under which Okupe and YouNeek Studios would release additional graphic novels through Dark Horse beginning in 2024. The agreement includes new titles within the YouNeek YouNiverse as well as a separate shared universe, launching with The Asiri Vol. 1.

In 2022, Lion Forge Entertainment entered a first-look agreement with Okupe to adapt his YouNeek Studios graphic novels, previously published through Dark Horse Comics, for television, film, and gaming. The arrangement expanded Lion Forge's rights to Iyanu: Child of Wonder, including options for live-action adaptations, and supported the continuing production of an animated Iyanu series for Cartoon Network and Max. The deal accompanied several broader initiatives at Lion Forge, including executive expansion, the launch of an international distribution division, a content partnership with Dentsu, and a multi-title development agreement with Penguin Young.

In 2025, Iyanu premiered on Cartoon Network on 5 April, followed by a streaming release on Max on 6 April and an African release on Showmax on 13 June. In Australia, the series was acquired by the Australian Broadcasting Corporation under a multi-season distribution agreement. Okupe stated that he conceived Iyanu: Child of Wonder prior to his daughter's birth and regarded the project as a way to create a character who could serve as a positive reflection of Nigerian heritage and culture for younger audiences, including his own child. In May 2025, it was announced that the series was renewed for a second season. The first feature set in the Iyanu universe, The Age of Wonders, was scheduled for release later in the year as a prequel set 500 years before the series, and a second feature film is in production for release in 2026.

In October 2025, Okupe announced that he is developing an afro-anime feature adaptation of Malika: Warrior Queen in collaboration with The Co-Production Company. Okupe stated that the project aims to combine anime and Afrobeats, with music playing a key role in driving emotion and storytelling, alongside a focus on mature themes and complex characters. As of March 2026, the project remains in development, with Okupe seeking production partners.

== Personal life ==
Okupe lives in the United States. He maintains close cultural and professional ties by continuing to work with Nigerian artists and actors and by centering Nigerian and Yoruba culture in his creative work. He expressed a long-term desire to mentor and support emerging Nigerian creatives.

== Recognition and awards ==
In 2017, Okupe was listed among New African Magazine 100 Most Influential Africans.

In 2020, Okupe received a Dwayne McDuffie Award for Diversity in Comics nomination for Iyanu: Child of Wonder.
