= Eric Collins (investor) =

American businessman

- Other name: Eric D. Collins
- Education: Harvard Law School
- Occupations: Businessman, serial entrepreneur; technology expert
- Known for: CEO and co-founder of Impact X Capital Partners

Eric D. Collins is an American businessman, serial entrepreneur, technology expert, and former President Obama appointee. He is the CEO and co-founder of Impact X Capital Partners. In 2021 Collins was announced as the host of Channel 4 business reality show The Money Maker (formerly The Profit). He has served on former President Barack Obama's Small Business Administration's Council on Underserved Communities.

== Early life and education ==
Eric Collins is originally from Alabama, United States. His late father was a university professor and then a Swiss chemical company executive, and his mother, a music educator and guidance counsellor. Collins has degrees from Princeton University and Harvard Law School, which he attended alongside Obama.

== Career ==
After graduating from Harvard University, Collins worked as a strategy consultant specializing in deal making and mergers before spinning out another consultancy firm as managing partner. Eric founded a consumer complaint tracking platform which he wound down in 2001.

Eric entered the tech industry in 2002 and since then has spent most of his career working in digital companies. He held roles at Tegic, an AOL subsidiary, Nuance Communications / MSFT, COO at Mobile Posse / Digital Turbine (2010-2013); and Chief Revenue and Distribution Officer at SwiftKey / MSFT (2014–2016), a predictive text firm. This role brought him to London and was then followed by a role at Touch Surgery / Medtronic as its Chief Operating Officer (2016-2018).

In 2018, Collins was part of a group of influential Black European and US serial entrepreneurs, institutional investors, investment bankers, corporate leaders and entertainers which led to the founding of Impact X Capital Partners.

Collins was named one of the UK's top 100 BAME leaders in technology by the Financial Times. He was voted one of the most influential Black people in Britain on Powerlist 2020.

Collins’ first book, We Don't Need Permission: Unlocking Black Empowerment for Good, was published in April 2022.

=== The Money Maker ===
Collins made his debut as host of The Money Maker on May 4, 2021, described by The Guardian newspaper as a "one-man Dragons' Den". It was positively received by the critics. The format is based on US business show The Profit on CNBC
