= Iyanu =

2025 animated TV series

- Genre: Fantasy; Superhero
- Created by: Roye Okupe; Brandon M. Easton
- Based on: Iyanu: Child of Wonder by Roye Okupe and Godwin Akpan
- Developed by: Lion Forge Entertainment
- Showrunner: Roye Okupe
- Written by: Brandon M. Easton; Kerri Grant; Roye Okupe; Ivory Floyd; Matt Wayne
- Directed by: Saxton Moore; Roye Okupe; Dawud Anyabwile; Darnell Johnson
- Voices of: Serah Johnson; Okey Jude; Samuel Kugbiyi; Adesua Etomi-Wellington; Blossom Chukwujekwu; Stella Damasus; Shaffy Bello
- Opening theme: "You Are" (performed by Yemi Alade)
- Composers: Femi "Fem D" Agunbiade; Andrew "December Moon" Johnson; "Kariz" Marcel Martin; Oladele "7g" Kiambu
- Countries of origin: United States; Nigeria; United Kingdom; South Africa
- Original language: English
- No. of seasons: 2
- No. of episodes: 20 + 2 films

Production
- Executive producers: David Steward II; Kirsten Newlands; Stephanie Sperber; Matt Heath; Roye Okupe; Erica Dupuis; Ryan Haidarian; Doug Schwalbe
- Producer: Kathy Page Cowan
- Production companies: Lion Forge Entertainment; YouNeek Studios; Impact X Capital; Forefront Media Group; Cartoon Network Studios (uncredited)

Original release
- Network: Cartoon Network
- Release: April 5, 2025 – present
- Network: Max
- Release: April 6 – May 24, 2025
- Network: HBO Max
- Release: August 31, 2025 – present

Iyanu is an animated superhero television series created by Roye Okupe and Brandon Easton for Cartoon Network. It is based on the graphic novel series Iyanu: Child of Wonder by Okupe and Godwin Akpan, published by his company YouNeek Studios and Dark Horse Comics. It premiered on Cartoon Network on April 5, 2025, and on HBO Max the following day.

In May 2025, the series was renewed for a second season, while two feature films were announced to be released in 2025 and 2026, respectively. The first film, Iyanu: The Age of Wonders, premiered on August 30, 2025. The second season premiered on Cartoon Network on March 21, 2026, and on HBO Max the following day. The second film, Iyanu: The War of Twin Princes, was released on July 11, 2026.

== Premise ==
Iyanu takes place in a Yoruba-inspired land and follows the title character, a teenage orphan girl who discovers that she has powers that have not been seen since the Age of Wonders. Together with her friends Biyi and Toye, she embarks on a journey to discover the truth about the evil lurking in her homeland, while learning about her past, parents, and destiny to save the world.

== Cast ==
- Serah Johnson as Iyanu, a young orphan girl who has mystic powers and is said to be "the chosen."
- Okey Jude as Biyi, the free-spirited and adventurous friend of Iyanu who lives in the Riverland Settlement.
- Samuel Kugbiyi as Toye, the bookish friend of Iyanu, who is often bullied by local townspeople, and wants to use books to help people, rather than becoming a warrior, going against his father's expectations.
- Adesua Etomi-Wellington as Olori, an exiled woman and the last Agoni, who Iyanu lives with, outside the walls of Elu, and is training her to hone her powers.
- Blossom Chukwujekwu as Kanfo, the father of Toye, and a General who expects Toye to become a soldier.
- Babajide Oyekunle as Ekun, a magical black leopard with blue spots who befriends Biyi, Iyanu, and Toye on their journey.
- Stella Damasus as Mama Sewa, matriarch of the Riverlands Settlement who attempts to convince Iyanu to fight for Yorubaland. Biyi is her adopted son.
- Femi Sowooli as Chancellor Nuro, a key royal advisor who does not want to change from the "old ways" and has a mysterious plan. He is also the brother of Olori.
- Paul Utomi as Oba Adeyinka, the King of Elu who is swayed by Chancellor Nuro and sees finding Iyanu as the top priority.
- Bukky Amoboye as Elder Ojuwa, a member of the Elu Mesi who is concerned about Olori and warns King Adeyinka about the worsening conditions in Elu's workers' district.
- Femi "Bakes" Olugbade as Uwa, a member of the Elu Mesi and foreign minister of Elu who wants Elu's citizens to travel to other countries rather than closing itself off and make other reforms to help the citizens. He is also the brother of King Adeyinka.
- Rashidat Fawehinmi Raji as Omolola, who represents the workers in Eso's worker district and meets with Uwa in the fourth episode.
- Eghosa Eboigbe as Zaza, a general who leads the People of the Deep and wants to find Kanfo at any cost.
- Shaffy Bello as Emi, who is also known as "The One Mother"
- Ike Ononye as Elder Alapani
- Lord Frank as The Fallen One
- Tolulope Kolade as Siju
- Iheanetu Edith Chidinma as Teju
- Oluwashindaara Adejokun as Young Olori

== Episodes ==
Season	Episodes	Originally released		
Season	Episodes	First released	Last released	Network
1	10	April 5, 2025	August 30, 2025	Cartoon Network / Max (Note: Iyanu: The Age of Wonders was released on HBO Max on August 31, 2025.)
2	10	March 21, 2026	July 11, 2026	Cartoon Network / HBO Max

=== Season 1 (2025) ===
No. overall	No. in season	Title	Directed by	Written by	Original release date
1	1	"The Chosen"	Dawud Anyabwile	Brandon Easton and Roye Okupe	April 5, 2025
Iyanu travels through the forest and comes upon a local town, within the outer wall surrounding the royal city, where her friend Toye lives. He defends her at first from local kids bullying her, but later relents when threatened. Iyanu runs away and her magic powers activate. Olori reminds her that traveling outside the forest is dangerous. There is debate within the royal court over whether to allow individuals to leave the town. It is revealed that the town's warriors have encountered a beast and that Olori is in exile. She later shows Iyanu how to cleanse animals of their corruption and stops her from asking about her past. Toye is bullied by kids in his hometown. Iyanu saves Toye and the other kids from the corrupted beast. Olori defends Iyanu from the guards from the local town, led by General Kanfu, and encourages Iyanu to escape, which she does, and barely evades the guards. She makes her way through another part of the wall, around Elu, and faces a leopard.
2	2	"The Exiles"	Darnell Johnson	Brandon Easton	April 5, 2025
Iyanu runs from the leopard and uses her magic power to connect with it. This only lasts for a temporary time before it blasts her into the nearby river. She meets Biyi. Meanwhile, General Kanfu reports to the chancellor that they could not find Iyanu. Ojuwa asks why Olori was attacked. It is revealed that conditions in the city's worker district are becoming worse, with Chancellor Nuro dismissing these concerns. King Oba Adeyinka asserts that finding Iyanu is the top priority. Olori has been arrested. Elder Ojuwa speaks with her, as does Uwa, who is encouraged by Olori to search for Iyanu. Ojuwa and Uwa later make plans, while expressing their concern about Nuro. Iyanu and Biyi escape from wild dogs. Toye reluctantly joins his father's military force trying to find Iyanu. Biyi brings Iyanu to his village and she saves him from a corrupted rhino, using her magic power, then collapses.
3	3	"The Eso of Eso"	Esteban Valdez	Kerri Grant	April 5, 2025
Toye travels with his father. Iyanu tries to explain her magic powers to Biyi, who brings her to the settlement by the river. While there, she meets the town matriarch, Mama Sewa, who shows her around the town, which is filled with exiles. Sewa hopes that Iyanu can help them return to an "age of wonder," but she is unsure. In an attempt to convince Iyanu otherwise, she shares some of the town's history, hoping to spark her "sense of duty" to help Yorubaland. Toye reads a story about the beginning of divine wars. Nuro moves through the fog, refusing help from anyone else. Iyanu fights Riverland guards in a fighting ring before collapsing. Toye talks to his father about his mother. Iyanu agrees to Sewa's suggestion that she stay in the settlement for a few days to help hone her magic powers, which are abilities to control non-animate objects and all plant life, and create divine constructs. She meditates and tries to reach inner peace. Olori tells Nuro he is destined to fail and reveals she is Nuro's sister.
4	4	"The Arrival"	Dawud Anyabwile	Kerri Grant	April 12, 2025
Biyi explains about Iyanu, explaining her positive and negative qualities. Uwa speaks with Omolola, representative of workers in Eso's worker district, about changes he wants to make in the city. However, she refuses to go before the council, saying she is needed in the district. She later shows him around the district. Sewa tries to encourage Iyanu to not rush her efforts to save Olori, telling her to connect to the earth and all life. Iyanu feels the connection and is told this is the heart of her supernatural power, allowing her to free Yorubaland. Biyi talks to Iyanu and they get into an argument. Later, Biyi tells Iyanu that he knows what it is to be under so much pressure, and they bond. Toye is rescued by his father from a group of leopards who attack him and his father's military group. Corrupted snakes attack those in the workers' district. Nuro makes a contract with an ancient evil in order to gain power, then sees a vision of the past. The Riverland perimeter is breached and the military force threatens to take Iyanu away, until another force appears.
5	5	"The People of the Deep"	Darnell Johnson	Ivory Floyd	April 19, 2025
A man leading a group calling themselves the "People of the Deep," comes to take Iyanu, saying she is "the chosen," demanding they either surrender her or everything will burn. Kanfo challenges this group's leader, Zaza, and they destroy the wagon that Toye is in. Biyu pulls Iyanu to safety, but she demands to go back to save the people of the Riverland despite what Mama Sewa says, and the mysterious leopard appears. Iyanu connects with the leopard, named Ekun, with her actions convincing a skeptical Biyu. Olori bursts out of her cell and finds herself in Nuro's room. Later, Iyanu, Biyi, Echo, and Toye work together to fight the People of the Deep within Riverland. However, they are overwhelmed and have to flee, all riding on Ekun. King Adeyinka is told of the issues in the workers' district, but Nuro convinces him it isn't a priority. Later, Iyanu, Biyu, and Toye find Mama Sewa, who says her goodbyes to all of them, before she passes away. Riverland is raided by the People of the Deep, with many of the dwellings lit on fire.
6	6	"The Walk of Death"	Esteban Valdez	Ivory Floyd	April 26, 2025
Nuro uncovers the hole in his room that Olori made during her escape and thinks back to a special scarf he gave her to "feel safe." He is told by the evil spirit that he needs absolute power, which he uses to take control of five individuals which will serve as his personal elite unit, with the voice telling him there is "no turning back" from this. Biyi, Iyanu, and Toye continue to flee on the back of Ekun. Toye warns them that according to his scrolls, they are about to enter an area where no one has escaped alive. Soon they are chased by a herd of corrupted animals. Olori is helped by Omolola, in the workers' district of Elu, and they see the beginnings of a workers rebellion, and she agrees to what Omolola has in mind so she can escape the city. Nuro begins a coup d'etat of Elu. Biyu, Iyanu, and Toye barely escape the animals, with Biyi and Iyanu fighting over Ekun getting hurt. The next morning, they are faced with the corrupted animals. Nuro follows what the evil spirit tells him.
7	7	"The Betrayal"	Dawud Anyabwile	Matt Wayne	May 3, 2025
Nuro leaves the city as evil energy spills over the city walls and spreads throughout the city. Olori hides in the reeds with Kanfo, and they begin traveling together, in hopes of finding Toye and Iyanu. At the same time in a cave, Toye begins to think of an escape plan for him, Iyanu, and Biyu. Some time later, Biyu reveals he is the son of King Adeyinka. In a concurrent scene, King talks with Uwa, saying he has no royal right because he poisoned their uncle, and tells more of what happened, from his perspective, noting his thinking. Biyu notes how he avoided the corrupted animals and somehow he was found, and saved, by Mama Sewa. Iyanu, Biyu, and Toye work together, as part of "Team Chosen," as they ride on Ekun, and barely escape, as they begin to look for "the source." The people of the worker's district come to the King's Palace, demanding to be listened to, and not lied to. Nuro travels to a former oasis. The corrupted/controlled guards working for Nuro are about to fight the other guards, but Uwa tries to calm everyone down. Later, the corrupted animals called by Nuro prepare to break into the worker's district of Elu. Iyanu, Biyu, Toye, and Eku collapse in the desert, and someone finds them.
8	8	"The Sacred"	Darnell Johnson	Matt Wayne	May 10, 2025
Iyanu awakes to find herself, Biyi, Toye, and Ekun rescued by locals from the swamplands, and bring them to The Source Mountain, where they can meet the Guardians, and are guided inside by a group of priests. With support from her friends, Iyanu describes herself as "The Chosen," and is tasked with passing the three trials to prove that this is the case, with a flashback showing all the false wonders who came to the mountain before. Meanwhile, Chancellor Nuro, possessed by the Fallen One, mind controls the People of the Deep and their leader, so they will do his bidding. Iyanu goes through a dangerous obstacle course, testing her skills, so she can make her way through the mountain, and she succeeds, while using advice she got from Mama Sewa. Fighting breaks out in part of Elu with the mind-controlled guards, the corrupted animals come inside the city's outer walls, and Omolola gets concessions from the ruling council. Using her control of natural elements, she is able to get through the second trial. Kanfo and Olori meet Biyi, Toye, Iyanu, and Ekun, having tracked them there. Iyanu loses control off her powers when angrily confronting Olori, but decides to travel up the mountain to the Source, while riding Ekun. Nuro and his mind-controlled forces make their way to the Rinku Plains to find Iyanu.
9	9	"The Source"	Roye Okupe	Roye Okupe	May 17, 2025
10	10	"The Source"	Alfredo Steven Valdez	Brandon Easton	May 24, 2025
Part 1: Cursed animals begin to besiege Elu, beginning in the areas within the city, including the worker's district. Uwa promises that Nuro and King Adeyinka will be held accountable for their treachery, saying they need to put aside their differences, rallying the people who have gathered. Iyanu climbs the mountain, on the back of Ekun and has to get past impediments in her path, placed by the mountain itself, which are attempting to stop her because she did not pass the third trial. The sacred priests, Biyi, Toye, Olori, and Kanfo work to stop Nuro and his forces, who are trying to prevent Iyanu from lifting the curse upon Yorubaland, fighting them on a key bridge. Iyanu struggles, feeling she can't go forward, and Ekun saves her, but she falls down a crevice afterward. Biyi and Olori work together to destroy a key bridge, and causing the soldiers to fall into the river. Iyanu is able to make her way back to Ekun, and the mountain allows her to pass, and gives her passage to the mountain-peak where a woman greets her and calls Iyanu her daughter. Part 2: Iyanu connects with her mother, thanks to her powers, and tries to hug her, but she is ghost-like with a purple glow. The sacred lantern breaks, causing the evil essence to enter Nuro's body, imprisoning his real self. As such, he is able to reach the other side, causing the sacred priests, Biyi, Toye, Olori, and Kanfo to retreat. The corrupted animals continue to run rampant in Elu. Iyanu and Ekun enter the magical temple, and Iyanu's mother. She tells her she either has to join her forever or use the power of the Source to cleanse the corruption in Yorubaland and never see her mother again. Iyanu wants to be with her mother, but she decides to save Yorubaland even if won't see her mother again. After touching the Source, the land begins to be cleansed of corruption, and she gets a special bow and new armor. Iyanu saves Olori and faces down Nuro and is able to defeat him, but the evil essence escapes. The animals in Elu are uncorrupted by Iyanu. Nuro is imprisoned. A few weeks later, Toye and Kanfo return home, Riverland continues to rebuild with help from Biyi, Olori hopes to hear Iyanu again, and Iyanu continues her journey. The queen comes across an abandoned settlement, saying that Iyanu will lead to the destruction of the people of the deep.
11	Film	"Iyanu: The Age of Wonders"	Roye Okupe & Saxton Moore	Roye Okupe & Brandon Easton	August 30, 2025

=== Season 2 (2026) ===
No. overall	No. in season	Title	Directed by	Written by	Original release date
12	1	"The Reunion"	Dawud Anyabwile	Brandon Easton	March 21, 2026
13	2	"The Set of Seven"	Darnell Johnson	Matt Wayne	March 28, 2026
14	3	"The Offer"	Vinton Hueck	Ivory Floyd	April 4, 2026
15	4	"The Duel"	Dawud Anyabwile	Kerri Grant	April 11, 2026
16	5	"The Deep"	Darnell Johnson	Brandon Easton	April 18, 2026
17	6	"The Acceptance"	Vinton Hueck	Brandon Easton	April 25, 2026
18	7	"The Prayer"	Dawud Anyabwile	Brandon Easton	May 2, 2026
19	8	"The Battle for Elu"	Darnell Johnson	Kerri Grant & Ivory Floyd	May 16, 2026
20	9	"The Acolyte"	Roye Okupe	Roye Okupe	May 23, 2026
21	10	"The Conduit"	Vinton Heuck	Brandon Easton	May 23, 2026
22	Film	"Iyanu: The War of Twin Princes"	Roye Okupe	Roye Okupe	July 11, 2026

== Production ==
In July 2022, a television adaptation of the graphic novel series Iyanu: Child of Wonder by Roye Okupe and Godwin Akpan was announced by HBO Max and Cartoon Network, with Lion Forge Entertainment producing. Executive producers on the series included Lion Forge founder Dave Steward II, company president Stephanie Sperber, series creator Roye Okupe, Matt Heath, Kirsten Newland, Erica Dupuis of Impact X Capital, Ryan Haidarian of Forefront Media Group, and Doug Schwalbe of Superprod. Vincent Edwards serves as supervising director, with Saxton Moore as co-supervising director. Brandon M. Easton, who adapted the graphic novel, is credited as story editor and also led the writers' room. He co-created the series alongside Okupe.

Steward II stated that the story's authenticity aligns with Lion Forge's mission of creating and delivering inclusive content to global audiences, and said that "depth and layers of the Iyanu world allows [the studio] to create and explore a beautiful universe on-screen". In January 2023, Comic Book Resources stated that the series would be released in 2024, would "draw from Nigerian culture, music, and lore", and that Okupe would write and direct multiple episodes. In an interview with the show's executive producers, Steward II said it had been "a great partnership" of working with Okupe, making sure his creative voice is heard, and authenticity of the series is present.

In June 2023, it was announced that Lion Forge Entertainment was partnering with Black Women Animate Studios to recruit a "diverse pool of talent" for pre-production roles the series. This was confirmed in October 2023, with reports that Lion Forge would introduce the series to global distributors at MIPCOM. In May 2024, the initial voice cast for the series was announced, consisting entirely of Nigerian actors: Serah Johnson as Iyanu, Okey Jude as Biyi, Samuel Kugbiyi as Toye, Adesua Etomi-Wellington as Olori, Blossom Chukwujekwu as Kanfo, Shaffy Bello as Emi, Stella Damasus as Sewa, and Ike Ononye as Elder Alapani.

In July 2024, Lion Forge secured a distribution deal with Showmax, planning to release Iyanu in 44 African countries starting on June 13, 2025. Later that month, at San Diego Comic-Con, Lion Forge hosted a panel titled "Crafting Iyanu: An Inside Look at Lion Forge's Animated Series," where the first series preview was shown.

The series was "inspired by Avatar: The Last Airbender", had an "all-African voice cast", and draws inspiration from "Nigerian culture, music, and mythology." Following the series release, Nigerian singer Yemi Alade talked about the process of making music for the series while remaining authentic to "Nigerian culture and Yoruba mythology," with her opening song for the series, entitled "You Are," described as a "soaring anthem of identity" which echoed the "power of African storytelling through music."

In August 2024, the Martha's Vineyard African American Film Festival (MVAAFF) featured an Iyanu-themed event including clips, cultural and educational activities. In October 2024, an early trailer for Iyanu was shown at New York Comic Con."

In February 2025, Cartoon Network aired an extended clip and trailer for the first time of Iyanu during a marathon of The Amazing World of Gumball, confirming the series premiere date of April 5, 2025 on Cartoon Network and April 6 on Max. Later that month, ITVX announced it had acquired exclusive streaming rights for Iyanu in the United Kingdom, with non-exclusive rights for the Republic of Ireland. In April 2025, the Afro Animation Summit in Burbank, California, featured a screening of Iyanu and a discussion with Okupe and members of the voice cast and production team. Later that month, City Academy in St. Louis, Missouri, hosted a community event attended by Steward II, writer Kerri Grant, and voice actors Samuel Kugbiyi and Okey Jude.

Prior to the series release, Okupe told Reuters that he wanted the series, like the graphic novel, to create a character which served as a positive role model for his daughter and other people across the world, allowing for her to be entertained and inspired by her culture and heritage. In an interview with Paste, he described the series as a "very faithful adaptation," but differs from the original graphic novel, noted the process of working with Brandon Easton and Godwin Akpan, described the show's message as focusing on what it means to be a hero and having empathy for those you disagree with. He also noted the incorporation of Capoeira and Dambe boxing skills into how Iyanu fights in the series and called for people to watch the series, saying that the number of people who watch it will determine whether the series will continue. Steward told the St. Louis American that unlike Wakanda in Black Panther, Iyanu is "based on real culture – and in a real place," with the art, writers, and voice cast composed of Black people, adding that most times Black characters are shown in media, much of the decision not created by "people who look like what’s being portrayed on screen."

In the United States, Iyanu premiered on Cartoon Network on April 5, 2025, and began streaming on Max the day after, with the series trailer released on February 17.

== Release ==
In Sub-Saharan Africa, the series was released on Showmax, across 44 countries, on June 13, 2025. In the United Kingdom, and Ireland, the series was released on ITVX on July 3, 2025. The series was originally announced to be 15 episodes long, however Lion Forge Entertainment had later posted on X that episode 10 is the season one finale.

After the series released, Comics Beat interviewed Brandon Easton, Vincent Edwards, and Samuel Kugbiyi about the series. Edwards said that those working on the series wanted to make sure the series was "top shelf quality stuff" while Easton and Kugbiyi noted their stories of joining the show's crew. Additionally, Easton described the challenges of deciding what to keep, and not keep, from the graphic novel, but noted that everyone was "on the same page" and there was collaboration between the writers, storyboarders, directors, voice cast, and others. He also argued that it wasn't an issue to incorporate anything from West Africa and Nigeria and incorporating it into the story, noting different filmmakers which used the "visual shorthand of emotion" and added it to their stories, asserting that the core question of Iyanu is who you are. Edwards further noted the efforts to add in "subtleties that aren’t always on the page of a script" through the characters and the importance of sticking with the rules of a fantasy world you create.

In Australia, the second season and its accompanying film released in its entirety on ABC iview on March 14, 2026.

== Merchandising ==
Iyanu established several merchandising agreements, beginning with Kidazzle, which was named master toy licensee in May 2024. Kidazzle intends to produce a range of dolls, action figures, playsets, and role-play items based on the series. In October 2024, Brown Toy Box entered into a licensing partnership to create educational STEAM (Science, Technology, Engineering, Arts and Math) kits inspired by Iyanu. In February 2025, Resurrection Games partnered to develop a series of Iyanu-themed board and card games, including "Yorubaland: Wild Terrain," "Iyanu: Crossroads," and "Iyanu: Mark of the Chosen."

== Theme song ==
Nigerian Afropop artist Yemi Alade performed the theme song featured in the opening Title sequence titled "You Are" for the animated superhero series Iyanu, produced by Lion Forge Entertainment and Alcon Sleeping Giant. The full song was released on March 13, 2025, coinciding with Alade's birthday, and became available on major streaming platforms including Spotify and Apple Music. The track was written by Michael Hodges, Gerald Trottman, Kayla Morrison, Ghian Wright, and Yemi Alade, and produced by Hodges. A lyric video premiered the same day on the Iyanu YouTube channel, followed by the release of an official visualizer video on April 11, 2025 via Alade's own YouTube channel, directed by Nigerian filmmaker Praise "Pink" Onyeagwalam.

In April 2025, Alade promoted the series in New York City, appearing on ABC News Live with Linsey Davis, and on Good Night New York alongside Christal Young and Ryan Kristafer. In her interviews, she emphasized the cultural and personal resonance of the series, calling attention to its significance for African audiences and young girls worldwide.

== Reception ==
Iyanu has received positive reviews. Brandon Zachary of Screen Rant called the series a mix of Avatar: The Last Airbender and Black Panther, complete with strong animation, imagery, and worldbuilding, and inclusion of Nigerian Yoruba "cultural touchstones" which could become an animated epic alongside Cartoon Network series like Adventure Time. Zachary also praised the series "engaging and colorful world," establishing Iyanu as a relatable and charming character, while building off classic character archetypes, comedy moments, having fluid animation, and said the series had a lot of promise. Frantz Jerome of Black Nerd Problems said they were blown away by the series and its authenticity, praising it for "bringing Nigerian culture to the global mainstream stage", said the origin story is more similar to Spider-Man: Homecoming rather than Avatar the Last Airbender, and noted that the series has "touchpoints that make African culture accessible."

US Black Engineer & Information Technology magazine called the series "groundbreaking" and a "gripping adventure" which aims to "inspire the next generation." Katherine Hill of Toybook described Iyanu as a "vibrant new animated series inspired by Nigerian culture and mythology" while blending together education, action, and fantasy, all of which are rooted in traditions of Nigerian storytelling. Ashley Moulton on Common Sense Media said that while the series has "mild action and fight scenes" most violence happens from "magical laser beams used by supernatural characters" and noted that there are some "teen crushes, and...hostile and threatening language" without any curse words. Moulton further said that the series is fresh, fun, and twists normal "cartoon norms," with an animation style familiar to those who like ThunderCats or He-Man and the Masters of the Universe and said that although some episodes have dialogue which is "clunky" and a lot of backstory, the series is entertaining, and rated it 4 out 5 stars.

At the 57th NAACP Image Awards, Iyanu received nominations for Outstanding Children's Program and Outstanding Animated Series; in addition, Roye Okupe and Brandon Easton were nominated for Outstanding Writing in a Television Movie, Documentary or Special for Iyanu: The Age of Wonders.
