= Dopamine (2003 film) =

- Release poster
- Directed by: Mark Decena
- Written by: Mark Decena; Timothy Breitbach
- Produced by: Tad Fettig; Debbie Brubaker
- Starring: John Livingston; Sabrina Lloyd
- Cinematography: Robert Humphreys
- Edited by: Jessica Congdon
- Music by: Eric Holland
- Production company: Kontent Films
- Distributed by: Sundance Channel
- Release date: October 3, 2003
- Running time: 84 minutes
- Language: English
- Box office: $22,875

Dopamine is a 2003 romantic comedy-drama film written and directed by Mark Decena.

== Plot ==
Rand is a computer animator, who has created an artificial intelligence creature designed to interact with children and teach them responsibility. When his prototype is forced into practice at a school, Rand encounters Sarah, a teacher he was inexplicably drawn to, at his favorite bar one fateful evening. Sparks fly between them, but fundamental differences in their approaches to love and relationships slow them down to a halt.

== Cast ==
- John Livingston as Rand
- Sabrina Lloyd as Sarah
- Bruno Campos as Winston
- Rueben Grundy as Johnson
- Kathleen Antonia as Tammy
- Nicole Wilder as Machiko
- William Windom as Rand's father
- Dennis Yen as Toru
- Natalie Decena in the womb

== Reception ==
=== Critical response ===
On Rotten Tomatoes it has a 52% rating based on 52 reviews. On Metacritic it has a score of 52 out of 100 based on 23 reviews, indicating "mixed or average" reviews.

=== Awards ===
- Won the Alfred P. Sloan Prize at the 2003 Sundance Film Festival
- Nomination for Grand Jury Prize at the 2003 Sundance Film Festival.

Awards
Preceded by n/a	Alfred P. Sloan Prize Winner; 2003	Succeeded by Primer
