= The Tiny Chef Show =

American live-action/stop-motion comedy children's television series

- Genre: Comedy; Cooking
- Created by: Rachel Larsen; Ozlem "Ozi" Akturk; Adam Reid
- Directed by: Rachel Larsen; Chris Tichborne
- Voices of: Matt Hutchinson; Odessa A'zion; Michael-Leon Wooley; Alasdair Saunders
- Narrated by: RuPaul; Alan Cumming; Nicole Byer; Amy Sedaris; Rebel Wilson
- Theme music composer: Nathan Barr
- Opening theme: "Follow Your Nose" by Matt Hutchinson
- Composer: Jared Faber
- Country of origin: United States
- Original language: English
- No. of seasons: 3
- No. of episodes: 41

Production
- Executive producers: Stephanie Sperber; Ron Howard; Brian Grazer; Kristen Bell; Morgan Sackett; Phil Chalk; Rachel Larsen; Ozlem "Ozi" Akturk; Adam Reid; Leah Gotcsik; Alex Bulkley (seasons 2–3); Corey Campodonico (seasons 2–3)
- Production companies: Factory (season 1); ShadowMachine (seasons 2–3); Imagine Kids+Family; Tiny Chef Productions; Dunshire Productions; Nickelodeon Animation Studio

Original release
- Network: Nickelodeon (2022–2024); Nick Jr. Channel (2025)
- Release: September 9, 2022 – March 6, 2025

The Tiny Chef Show is an American live action/stop motion children's television series created by Rachel Larsen, Ozlem "Ozi" Akturk and Adam Reid that premiered on Nickelodeon on September 9, 2022.

In June 2025, in a controversial move, the series was cancelled after three seasons in the midst of the merger between Nickelodeon's parent company, Paramount Global, and Skydance Media; with the cancellation being announced via a video animated by the team behind the show. On July 1, the show's creators announced that they had crowdfunded enough to continue social media posts. This was reported on July 3 as the show being "saved", leaving the creators to clarify the following day that they were still working on a deal to revive the series. As of 2026, however, the show remains canceled.

== Premise ==
The Tiny Chef Show follows the chef as he cooks tiny dishes from his tree-stump home on his in-universe cooking show, along with a robot named Olly, a snail named Henry, and a caterpillar named Ruby.

=== Sketches ===
- What's in My Bag? – Tiny Chef hosts a game show where he asks his contestants Olly, Bonzo, and Henry what the main ingredient is in his bag. Olly is usually the one who gets it right. Tiny Chef wears an apron and a fake moustache when hosting this sketch.
- Ingredient Documentary – The narrator explains the history of a certain ingredient. In seasons two and three, the narration is provided by Spoon of the Stump Band.
- Tiny Time Dance – Tiny Chef and Olly do the Tiny Time Dance while certain foods are in the oven as a transition between the start and end of baking.
- Dish with Chef – Tiny Chef hosts a video talk show where he asks a celebrity questions revolving around the food, while he wears red glasses. When "asking for a friend" on how to get through a situation, the celebrity would give advice to Tiny Chef that would lead to him taking it.
- Good Golly with Olly - Olly talks about certain things regarding the episode's content.

== Characters ==
- Tiny Chef (voiced by Matt Hutchinson) is a vegan green humanoid creature who lives in a tree stump and makes different dishes. He speaks with rhotacism and often replaces phonemes with a "bl" sound.
- Olly (voiced by Odessa A'zion) is a female robot made from different items who is Tiny Chef's best friend and assistant.
- Announcer (voiced by RuPaul from "Pancakes" to "Home Movie Night", Alan Cumming from "Tiny Chef's Marvelous Mish Mesh Special" to "Lettuce Wraps", Nicole Byer from "Granola Bars" to "Dumplings", Amy Sedaris from "Avocado Sushi" to "Tiny Chef's Spooky Stump Spectacular", Rebel Wilson from "Fwendsgiving Feast" to "Vegetable Stew") is an offscreen announcer who introduces the show and sketches. The announcer's voice varies between the episodes and is always voiced by some sort of celebrity.
- Robin (portrayed by Dana Alexander) is a live-action delivery girl who is friends with Tiny Chef and Olly.
- Henry is a slow-moving snail with a colorful shell who helps Tiny Chef and Olly introduce the food of the day.
- Ruby is Tiny Chef's fuzzy pet caterpillar.
- Miss Penny is Tiny Chef's long-haired cat. In 2026, it was revealed that Miss Penny had died.
- The Stump Band is the show's house band, a musical group of living kitchen utensils consisting of the wooden spoon on guitar (voiced by Michael-Leon Wooley), a wooden fork on drums, and a wood-handled spatula on upright bass. In season 2, the Stump Band was restructured with the wooden fork now on upright bass and the Stump Band including a cheese shredder who rubs thimbles against itself. The wooden spoon is the only member with any lines.
- Bonzo (voiced by Alasdair Saunders) is a sentient can of beans most seen during the "What's in My Bag?" segment. He always thinks that beans (the only word he can say, a revision from his earliest appearances where he said other words) are in the bag.

== Episodes ==
=== Series overview ===
Season	Segments	Episodes	Originally released	
Season	Segments	Episodes	First released	Last released
1	16	8	September 9, 2022	October 28, 2022
2	23	12	November 20, 2023	June 20, 2024
3	21	11	October 21, 2024	March 6, 2025

=== Season 1 (2022) ===
No. overall	No. in season	Title	Written by	Original release date	Prod. code	U.S. viewers (millions)
1	1	"Pancakes"	Alec Schwimmer	September 9, 2022	104	0.17
1	1	"S'Mores"	Jordan Gershowitz	September 9, 2022	104	0.17
"Pancakes": Tiny Chef makes pancakes, but loses his confidence when he breaks his lucky pancake-flipping spatula and is unsure what to do. Guest star: Kristen Bell "S'Mores": With some help from his friends, Tiny Chef whips up something new for a campout. To do a campout, Tiny Chef must overcome his fear of the dark. Guest star: Tabitha Brown
2	2	"Pizza"	Rachel Larsen and Adam Reid	September 16, 2022	101	0.23
2	2	"Bread"	Rachel Larsen and Adam Reid	September 16, 2022	101	0.23
"Pizza": Tiny Chef makes pizza and learns friendship is more important than toppings after Ruby eats the basil that was to be used for the pizza. Guest star: Kristen Bell "Bread": Tiny Chef bakes bread, but forgets to watch his rising dough and needs to think fast when the dough grows too big. Guest star: Keith L. Williams
3	3	"Popcorn"	Sarah Nerboso	September 23, 2022	102	0.19
3	3	"Banana Toast"	Jim Nolan	September 23, 2022	102	0.19
"Popcorn": Tiny Chef hosts movie night for friends and turns the tree stump into a popcorn machine to pop enough for everyone even with delivery girl friend Dana being in attendance. Guest star: Ca'Ron Coleman "Banana Toast": Tiny Chef makes banana toast. After squishing his perfect banana, has to create a new dish from the ruined banana. Guest star: Tabitha Brown
4	4	"Freeze Pops"	Jordan Gershowitz	September 30, 2022	103	0.22
4	4	"Lemonade"	Laura Kleinbaum	September 30, 2022	103	0.22
"Freeze Pops": Tiny Chef makes freeze pops. Due to them taking long to freeze up, Tiny Chef turns down the freezer's temperature enough to trap them in a block of ice. Guest star: Josh Gad "Lemonade": Tiny Chef is making tiny lemonade. This becomes hard as Ruby keeps eating the red ingredients. Guest star: RZA
5	5	"Cranberry Cookies"	Sarah Jenkins	October 7, 2022	105	0.24
5	5	"Snap Pea Stir-Fry"	Teresa Lee	October 7, 2022	105	0.24
"Cranberry Cookies": Tiny Chef and Olly find that a ladybug has moved into the neighborhood. In order to welcome it, they work to make cranberry cookies. Guest star: That Girl Lay Lay "Snap Pea Stir Fry": Tiny Chef wants to make snap pea stir-fry until he injures his arm. When Olly, Ruby, and Henry want to help out, Tiny Chef insists that he can do it on his own which proves to be difficult for him. Guest stars: Sky Brown and Ocean Brown
6	6	"Apple Pie Crumble"	Sara Karimipour	October 14, 2022	106	N/A
6	6	"Guacamole"	Rebecca Delgado	October 14, 2022	106	N/A
"Apple Pie Crumble": Tiny Chef and Olly make an apple pie for a local baking competition. When the top crust gets ruined during the trip there, Tiny Chef will have to turn it into another food before the baking contest starts. Guest star: Josh Dela Cruz "Guacamole": Tiny Chef makes guacamole with his new tool. Though Olly wants to have a turn with it. Guest star: Josh Gad
7	7	"Ants on a Log"	Ta'riq Fisher	October 21, 2022	107	0.20
7	7	"Quesadillas"	Sarah Nerboso	October 21, 2022	107	0.20
"Ants on a Log": Tiny Chef is planning a picnic for Olly, Henry, and Ruby. As he prepares to prepare the food for the picnic, it ends up disappearing causing Tiny Chef to find out what happened to it. Guest star: Liza Koshy "Quesadillas": As Tiny Chef prepares to make quesadillas, he reaches an obstacle in the form of a salsa jar that won't open. When his friends take a shot at it, they are unable to open it causing them to come up with a solution to get it opened. Guest star: Bethany Rivera
8	8	"Mac and Cheese"	Rebecca Delgado	October 28, 2022	108	0.23
8	8	"Potato Stew"	Sarah Nerboso	October 28, 2022	108	0.23
"Mac and Cheese": On a rainy day, Tiny Chef decides to make macaroni and cheese. While preparing it, Tiny Chef suffers a set back that involves having to deal with a leaky roof and the use of different items to catch the water drops that come through. Guest star: Josh Dela Cruz as Josh "Potato Stew": In this pirate-themed episode, Tiny Chef prepares a pirate-themed potato stew. He goes through the garden to look for the right component in order to improve the potato stew when cooking it. Guest star: Malia Dawkins

=== Season 2 (2023–24) ===
No. overall	No. in season	Title	Written by	Original release date	Prod. code	U.S. viewers (millions)
9	1	"Fwendsgiving"	Rachel Larsen	November 20, 2023	999	0.14
9	1	"Home Movie Night"	Rachel Larsen	November 20, 2023	999	0.14
"Fwendsgiving": On Friendsgiving, it is snowing outside. Tiny Chef gets a call from Olly, Bonzo, and Spoon of the Stump Band that they will be delayed as Tiny Chef works to carry on without them. Soon, Tiny Chef gets worried that he might be celebrating Friendsgiving and his pumpkin feast on his own even when he hears on the radio that all flights have been cancelled. Guest star: Jackie Tohn "Home Movie Night": Tiny Chef holds his first home video showcase with Olly, Bonzo, Ruby, and Henry, and the Stump Band where they watch the different memories shown on their show like Ruby and Henry's moments, Bonzo's moments, Tiny Chef's most embarrassing moments, and Tiny Chef's presentation on turkeys. Tiny Chef wants to save the Golden Clip for last despite everyone else wanting to watch it next.
10	2	"Tiny Chef's Marvelous Mish Mesh Special"	Leah Gotcsik	December 4, 2023	201	0.13
Tiny Chef and Olly host their Christmas Mish Mesh Special where they celebrate everyone's Christmas traditions of Christmas, Hannukah, and Kwanzaa, and Tiny Chef makes his special Christmas cookies while picking out a marvelous outfit to wear. Tiny Chef also has arranged for Santa Claus to call them during their Mish Mesh special where he wrote a letter to him which wasn't picked up. Once a stamp was put on the letter, Tiny Chef resumes his call from Santa Claus as different people keep calling. When the letter for Santa Claus isn't picked up, Tiny Chef feels down as Olly works to get him into feeling good. Guest stars: Kristen Bell, Mayim Bialik, Santa J. Claus as Santa Claus, Young Dylan, April Moore, Jacob Moore, Justin Moore, Liam Moore, Kira Kosarin
11	3	"Donuts"	Leah Gotcsik	April 8, 2024	202A	0.11
Today is Olly's birthday. Tiny Chef plans to make her a birthday surprise in the form of donuts. To keep from waking Olly, Tiny Chef works to make the donuts as quietly as he can with help from Henry, Ruby, Bonzo, and the local insects. Guest star: Jordan Chiles
12	4	"Rainbow Salad"	Lucas Mills	April 9, 2024	202B	N/A
Tiny Chef and Olly prepare to babysit Jessica the Ladybug's many kids. They make a rainbow salad from colorful fruit and vegetables from their garden as Olly suggests they play with Henry and Ruby. However, things start to go awry when the kids cause a mess. Guest star: Aneeshwar Kunchala
13	5	"Matzo Ball Soup"	Michael Kaufman	April 10, 2024	203A	0.09
Henry has come down with the "sneezles". To help Henry feel better, Tiny Chef and Olly make matzo ball soup. Then Ruby gets the "sneezles" causing Tiny Chef and Olly to tend to her. Afterwards, a setback in making the matzo ball soup occurs when Tiny Chef comes down with the "sneezles" causing Olly to carry on making matzo ball soup without him. Note: This is the first time where a "Dish with Chef" segment did not have a famous person on it. In this case, Olly got a call from Tiny Chef checking in on her.
14	6	"Turon"	Brittany Rochford	April 11, 2024	203B	N/A
Tiny Chef and Olly get a fruit delivery. As the fruit is too big, they have to figure out what it is and harvest it's inside for the appropriate dish. This causes them to become fruit detectives and exit their stump another way where they find the fruit is big and work to further identify it so that they can make a dish from it. Guest star: Ceci Balagot
15	7	"Peanut Butter & Jelly"	Cynthia Furey	April 15, 2024	204A	0.10
The Stump Band are going on their snack break following a dance performance by Tiny Chef, Olly, Henry, and Ruby. Tiny Chef opts to make peanut butter and jelly sandwiches to avoid the Stump Band eating crackers from their van while Henry and Ruby cover the stump band by performance. Tiny Chef and Olly work to finish them before the Stump Band's snack break is done. Guest star: Lance Bass
16	8	"Potato Skins" "Potato Jackets"	Rachel Larsen	April 16, 2024	204B	0.07
Today is Potato Day as the potato king Henry is going to be choosing his potato as Potato Day is Henry's favorite holiday. He chooses the russet potato. When it comes to Olly finding out about Henry's favorite potato dish, Henry doesn't remember as Tiny Chef struggles to remember what it is as he makes different potato dishes to see if one of them is the one that Henry likes. Guest star: Wolfgang Schaeffer
17	9	"Granola Bars"	Marty Johnson	April 17, 2024	205A	0.11
Tiny Chef and Olly make granola bars. As they can't decide which flavor is the best, they compete in a cook-off. With Morton the Butterfly as the judge, Tiny Chef and Ruby make peanut butter and cranberry granola bar while Olly and Henry make maple syrup and blueberry granola bars. The final ingredient they must add by the announcer's suggestion is pecans.
18	10	"Nachos"	Annabeth Bondor-Stone & Connor White	April 18, 2024	205B	0.09
Tiny Chef and Olly go through the ideas to make the stump more fun. After fulfilling Ruby and Henry's ideas, they take Bonzo's idea to make nachos with a lot of beans. Winning "What's in My Bag?" for guessing beans correctly, Bonzo wins a boat full of beans and the opportunity to cook with Tiny Chef for the day. When it comes to the cooking of the nachos, Bonzo is very excited for wanting to use of the beans much to the dismay of Tiny Chef and Olly. Guest star: Cooper Barnes
19	11	"Fruit Chews"	Moujan Zolfaghari	April 22, 2024	206A	0.13
The Stump's Annual Snail Race is occurring and Henry is partaking on it. Because Ruby ate the snacks for Henry, Tiny Chef and Olly work on making an energy snack for Henry in the form of fruit chews. With Olly keeping an eye on the race, Tiny Chef puts together the fruit chew recipe. Though Tiny Chef has a setback when the fruit chews take too long to set and that they won't be done setting in time as the announcer recaps the last time when the Chill-O-Matic was used. Guest star: Ryan Blaney
20	12	"Opera Cake"	Mia Resella	April 23, 2024	206B	0.13
Tiny Chef and Olly find that Ruby is doing some singing as she wants to share it with the world. As Ruby works to do an opera song with Spoon, Olly works on a stage, and Tiny Chef works to make an opera cake. Of course various noisy setbacks occur during the baking of the opera cake when it come to Olly making the stage outside with noisy construction and Ruby working on mastering an opera song that has a high C in it. Guest star: Victory Brinker
21	13	"Ice Cream"	Adam Reid	April 24, 2024	207A	0.16
Tiny Chef and Olly sell their homemade vanilla ice cream to Henry and the Stump Band. Unfortunately, Bonzo shows up wanting ice cream only for Olly to tell Tiny Chef that they are out of homemade vanilla bean ice cream. To remedy this, Tiny Chef makes homemade vanilla bean ice cream with help from an ice cream maker named Old Cranky which they have a hard time operating. Guest star: Like Nastya
22	14	"Pasta & Sauce"	Gloria Shen	April 25, 2024	207B	0.14
Tiny Chef and Olly have made pasta noodles. Now they must choose the sauce by rolling the Wheel of Sauces. It lands on Chef Brody Bambino's slow-cooked very difficult super-secret tomato sauce. They watch the videotape of Chef Bambino who advises them to make it to perfection as the videotape self-destructs. Upon opening the safe on top of the associated VHS, Tiny Chef and Olly access the recipe for the slow-cooked very difficult super-secret tomato sauce as they work to master it with the secret ingredient in the form of a strawberry and that the final stage is not listed. Note: This is the second time where a "Dish with Chef" segment did not have a famous person on it. In this case, Tiny Chef gets a call from Brody Bambino (portrayed by Matt Hutchinson) who gives him a tiny clue about what Tiny Chef hasn't done with the sauce yet.
23	15	"Chips & Dip"	Cynthia Furey	June 10, 2024	208A	N/A
After a nightmare of an onion appearing during his snow cone gig, Tiny Chef receives the Potato Chip of the Month in the mail. The dip chosen to go with it as onion dip. Though Tiny Chef has an issue with chopping onions as they always make him cry. Tiny Chef chops the onion quick which makes him cry causing Olly to chill it for some minutes. As Tiny Chef is not ready to do another attempt at chopping, he and Olly work on the rest of the ingredients for the onion dip as he works to avoid chopping the onion. Guest star: Rob Gronkowski
24	16	"Bee's Knees Tea"	Jehan Madhani	June 11, 2024	208B	N/A
Tiny Chef and Olly inform the viewers that the queen bee is coming to the stump and have plans to host a tea party. To go with the tea party, Tiny Chef and Olly make bee's knees tea which is a blend of chamomile, lavender blossoms, and lemongrass. When the queen bee and her subjects arrive, Olly does note that it is hot outside as Tiny Chef and Olly work to make the bee's knees tea. Though the heat causes a problem for some of the guests. Guest star: Liam Charles
25	17	"Dino Cake"	Lucas Mills	June 12, 2024	209A	N/A
Olly makes a video to show her Dinosaur Club her Triceratops model Sally. As her Dinosaur Club is coming to the stump, Tiny Chef and Olly plan to make chocolate Dino Cake. As Olly forgot to pick up the dinosaur name-tags at the store, Tiny Chef is asked to watch Sally as he has Henry, Ruby, and the Stump Band do something special as he makes a Super Sally-saurus Dino Cake as Tiny Chef gets carried away. Guest star: George Johnston IV
26	18	"Dumplings"	Peri Segel	June 13, 2024	209B	N/A
Tiny Chef has spent years learning how to make dumplings in order to become a dumpling maestro. After lots of practice, he has become one. Tiny Chef shows what he has learned to the viewers by making dumplings. During the cooking, Olly managed to perfect one of the dumplings easily. When Tiny Chef does the advanced flower fold, Olly manages to perfect that as well. Tiny Chef soon loses his confidence. Guest star: Ming Tsai
27	19	"Avocado Sushi"	Lucas Mills	June 17, 2024	210A	N/A
Tiny Chef picks out the perfect avocado. When converting for the avocado sushi, Tiny Chef puts it through the ripening. As Tiny Chef is starting to get too busy with the ripening, it puts a delay in using the other ingredients. This causes Olly to handle the ingredients as Tiny Chef works on the third stage of the ripening of the perfect avocado. Guest star: Tricia Fukuhara
28	20	"Poi"	Marty Johnson	June 18, 2024	210B	N/A
Having set up the stump to resemble Hawaii, Tiny Chef gets the idea to make poi from Auli'i Cravalho. The show starts before Tiny Chef can hear the remaining instructions for poi. Though they get some mixed comments on how to properly get the taro root softened for the poi. Tiny Chef and Olly work to get the taro root softened with comical results. Guest star: Auli'i Cravalho
29	21	"Ruby Stew"	Annabeth Bondor-Stone & Connor White	June 19, 2024	211A	N/A
Today is Ruby Day which commemorates Ruby as they wear Ruby Day shirts. Tiny Chef and Olly work to make ruby tarts with strawberries. Though there are some setbacks like the Ruby Day shirts getting shrunk when Bonzo handled the laundry which they wear as hats, the strawberry in question getting flattened after rolling out of control on the ramp causing them to substitute it with a mango, and the Ruby Day cutter getting dropped on the ground enough to break it. Guest stars: Jenni "JWoww" Farley, Meilani Mathews
30	22	"Smoothies"	Annabeth Bondor- Stone & Connor White	June 20, 2024	211B	N/A
After doing Stump Chore Day, Tiny Chef and Olly make strawberry mint smoothies outside while Henry does some cleaning inside. Unfortunately, they forgot to bring the ingredients outside and they can't get in the different entrances as Henry doesn't want any of them inside while he is doing some cleaning. Even after they find another way to get the ingredients for their smoothies, Tiny Chef and Olly must find another to make smoothies without the blender. Guest star: Coyote Peterson

=== Season 3 (2024–25) ===
No. overall	No. in season	Title	Written by	Original release date	Prod. code	U.S. viewers (millions)
31	1	"Tiny Chef's Spooky Stump Spectacular"	Lucas Mills	October 21, 2024	311	N/A
When Tiny Chef accidentally summons a spirit who dislikes Halloween, things keep going wrong with the Stump's Halloween special; Chef and Olly must find a sweet way to settle that spirit before he ruins Halloween with his tricks. Guest star: Alan Cumming
32	2	"Fwendsgiving Feast"	Sammie Crowley	November 11, 2024	309	N/A
32	2	"Blueberry Crumble"	Ron Holsey	November 11, 2024	309	N/A
"Fwendsgiving Feast": Tiny Chef wants to make a special dish for every single one of their 12 friend coming to Frendsgiving that include but are not limited to potatoes for Fork, pumpkin pie, cranberry sauce for Anya, macaroni and cheese for Morton, corn for Jessica, turon for Shredder, peanut butter for Henry, and cake for Ruby. They struggles to do it all in time before everyone arrives for the Friendsgiving Feast. Guest star: Amirah Kassem "Blueberry Crumble": The gang heads to The Other Side of the Fence so Olly can pick the first blueberry of the season and use it in a blueberry crumble. Olly is desperate to have the blueberry picked before anyone else gets to it. Of course Tiny Chef keeps getting distracted from everything on the way to the blueberry bush when going through the Wild Wild Weed Patch, going around the Perilous Pond that is daily formed by a sprinkler system, and up the blueberry bush.
33	3	"Nopales Taco"	Mia Resella	January 7, 2025	301	N/A
33	3	"Sloppy Joes"	Danielle DeCourcey	January 7, 2025	301	N/A
"Nopales Taco": Accepting a knightly quest, Sir Chef sets out to turn a prickly pear cactus into nopales. Guest star: Danny Trejo "Sloppy Joes": When Chef is gifted a brand new apron, he vows to keep it clean. But keeping clean isn't easy when sloppy joes are the dish of the day. Guest star: Kristen Bell
34	4	"Noodle Bowls"	Sammie Crowley	January 14, 2025	302	N/A
34	4	"Spicy Cauliflower Bites"	Cynthia Furey	January 14, 2025	302	N/A
"Noodle Bowls": Chef wants to host dinner and a show but struggles when he can't seem to get any of his magic tricks right. Guest star: SeanDoesMagic "Spicy Cauliflower Bites": Chef aims to make an extreme snack for Henry's extreme cousin, but he accidentally makes his spicy cauliflower bites too spicy. Guest star: Tony Hawk
35	5	"Celery & Hummus"	Evan Sinclair	January 21, 2025	303	
35	5	"Lettuce Wraps"	Marty Johnson	January 21, 2025	303	
"Celery & Hummus": Chef, Olly, Ruby and Henry compete in the annual celeryjack Games, but Chef, who is not used to lose, faces stiff competition this year. Guest star: The Miz "Lettuce Wraps": When Chef and Olly's lettuce goes missing, they become veggie detectives to try and solve the case. Guest star: Aisha Tyler
36	6	"Chili & Cornbread"	Sammie Crowley	January 28, 2025	304	N/A
36	6	"Layer Cake"	Cynthia Furey	January 28, 2025	304	N/A
"Chili and Cornbread": Chef entrusts Olly with his super-special cornbread pan, but things go wrong when she dents it. Guest star: Carla Hall "Layer Cake": Chef and Olly set out to make a cake that breaks the record for most layers ever, but quickly realize how hard it is. Guest star: Mikaela Shiffrin
37	7	"Bean Cake?"	Marty Johnson	February 4, 2025	305	N/A
37	7	"Elote"	Annabeth Bondor-Stone & Connor White	February 4, 2025	305	N/A
"Bean Cake?": Chef and Olly promise Bonzo they'll make him a lookalike bean cake to Celebrate Bean Day, but their lookalike practice cakes get in the way. Guest star: Duff Goldman "Elote" : Chef and Olly are planning a corn roast, but Ruby gets stuck at the top of a tall corn stalk. Guest star: Tariq the Corn Kid
38	8	"Banana Bread"	Evan Sinclair	March 3, 2025	306	N/A
38	8	"Starfruit Parfait"	Marty Johnson	March 3, 2025	306	N/A
"Banana Bread" : When Chef learns he's going to be on the cover of a cooking magazine, he obsesses over getting the perfect pic. Guest star: Matt Hutchinson as Brody Bambino "Starfruit Parfait" : At Chef's stargazing starfruit sleepover, Chef and Olly get so distracted with fin activities that their friends. Guest star: Christina Koch
39	9	"Veggie Burgers & Secret Sauce"	Adam Reid	March 4, 2025	307	N/A
39	9	"Ratatouille"	Brittany Rochford	March 4, 2025	307	N/A
"Veggie Burgers & Secret Sauce": When Chef runs out of secret sauce, he must venture to the Stump's secret recipe vault. Guest star: Jesse Tyler Ferguson "Ratatouille": Chef is ready to plant some seedlings, but the garden's soil is hard as a rock; he seeks help from some neighbor worms, but they aren't so easy to befriend. Guest star: Glee Dango
40	10	"Cinnamon Buns"	Lucas Mills	March 5, 2025	308	N/A
40	10	"Souffle"	Marty Johnson	March 5, 2025	308	N/A
"Cinnamon Buns": For Chef's birthday, Chef and Olly follow clues on a journey that leads to a surprise. Guest star: Pyper Braun "Souffle": When a rumor spreads that Chef can't make a souffle, he is determined to show that he can. Guest star: Tamera Mowry
41	11	"Baked Apples"	Sammie Crowley	March 6, 2025	310	N/A
41	11	"Vegetable Stew"	Marty Johnson	March 6, 2025	310	N/A
"Baked Apples": Chef and Olly are about to make baked apples when two apples start behaving mysteriously. Guest star: Vera Farmiga "Vegetable Stew": Olly takes Chef camping for the first time; but when Chef tries to cook without the comforts of the stump, he struggles with how different everything is. Guest star: Max Woods (aka Chef Max)

== Production ==
In 2018, Reid, Larsen, and Aktuk launched The Tiny Chef Show web series.

On August 12, 2020, it was announced that Nickelodeon had ordered the series from Imagine Kids+Family, Tiny Chef Productions, and Nickelodeon Animation Studio. On August 4, 2022, it was announced that Kristen Bell would be an executive producer, and that the show would premiere on September 9, 2022.

On November 2, 2023, it was announced that Nickelodeon renewed the series for a 12-episode second season, which premiered on November 20, 2023.

=== Cancellation ===
On June 24, 2025, Nickelodeon cancelled the series after three seasons. In response, the creators uploaded an animation on social media featuring Tiny Chef getting a call from Nickelodeon where he learns of the show's cancellation and begins to cry, which garnered viral attention. The creators would also open up a crowdfunding site to keep the show going through social media platforms. Subsequent shorts released by the creators included Tiny Chef sadly playing his banjo while singing "Paint It Black" by The Rolling Stones as Ruby runs around knocking things over (including the camera), and becoming too depressed to get out of bed and make food, instead constantly ordering pizza and doomscrolling while smiling and laughing.

Several celebrities, such as Florence Pugh, Melissa McCarthy, and Dionne Warwick have voiced support for the series and its creators, while film studio A24 have also reached to the creators as well.

In 2026, the Tiny Chef character returned in a miniseries sponsored by IKEA.

== Reception ==
Diondra Brown from Common Sense Media gave the series four-out-of-five stars, saying that it "will likely inspire children to want to get in the kitchen and make yummy dishes, big or small." Creator Reid reflects that audiences may connect with the show because Tiny Chef "looks for the good in everything" and is "also very human".

=== Awards and nominations ===
Year	Award	Category	Nominee(s)	Result	Ref.
2023	50th Annie Awards	Best Animated Television/Broadcast Production for Preschool Children	"Pancakes"	Won	
2023	2nd Children's and Family Emmy Awards	Outstanding Preschool Animated Series	Ozlem "Ozi" Akturk, Kristen Bell, Phil Chalk, Brian Grazer, Ron Howard, Rachel Larsen, Adam Reid, Morgan Sackett, Stephanie Sperber, Hannah Ferguson, Jonny Belt and Robert Scull	Nominated	
2023	2nd Children's and Family Emmy Awards	Outstanding Writing for a Preschool Animated Program	Jim Nolan, Rebeca Delgado, Ta'riq Fisher, Jordan Gershowitz, Sarah Jenkins, Sara Karimipour, Laura Kleinbaum, Rachel Larsen, Teresa Lee, Sarah Nerboso, Adam Reid and Alec Schwimmer	Nominated	
2023	2nd Children's and Family Emmy Awards	Outstanding Directing for a Preschool Animated Program	Rachel Larsen and Chris Tichborne	Won	
2025	52nd Annie Awards	Best Animated Television/Broadcast Production for Preschool Children	"Tiny Chef's Spooky Stump Spectacular"	Won	
2025	3rd Children's and Family Emmy Awards	Outstanding Preschool Animated Series	Ozlem 'Ozi' Akturk, Kristen Bell, Alex Bulkley, Corey Campodonico, Leah Gotcsik, Brian Grazer, Ron Howard, Rachel Larsen, Adam Reid, Morgan Sackett, Michael Kaufman, Sara Crowley and Jason Wyatt	Won	
2025	3rd Children's and Family Emmy Awards	Outstanding Animated Special	Ozlem 'Ozi' Akturk, Kristen Bell, Alex Bulkley, Corey Campodonico, Leah Gotcsik, Brian Grazer, Ron Howard, Rachel Larsen, Adam Reid, Morgan Sackett, Michael Kaufman, Sara Crowley, Jason Wyatt and Rob Shaw (For "Tiny Chef's Marvelous Mish Mesh Special")	Nominated	
2025	3rd Children's and Family Emmy Awards	Outstanding Editing for a Preschool Animated Program	Hamilton Barrett, Mandy Hutchings and Holly Klein	Nominated	
2026	4th Children's and Family Emmy Awards	Outstanding Preschool Animated Series	Ozlem Akturk, Kristen Bell, Alex Bulkley, Corey Campodonico, Leah Gotcsik, Brian Grazer, Ron Howard, Rachel Larsen, Adam Reid, Morgan Sackett, Stephanie Sperber, Michael Kaufman, Sara Crowley and Jason Wyatt	Won	
2026	4th Children's and Family Emmy Awards	Outstanding Writing for a Preschool Animated Series	Leah Gotcsik and Lucas Mills (For "Tiny Chef's Spooky Stump Spectacular")	Nominated	
2026	4th Children's and Family Emmy Awards	Outstanding Directing for a Preschool Animated Series	Rob Shaw (For "Tiny Chef's Spooky Stump Spectacular")	Won	
2026	4th Children's and Family Emmy Awards	Outstanding Editing for a Preschool Animated Program	Hamilton Barrett, Mandy Hutchings and Holly Klein (For "Tiny Chef's Spooky Stump Spectacular")	Won	
