= Adam Reid (filmmaker) =

American film director

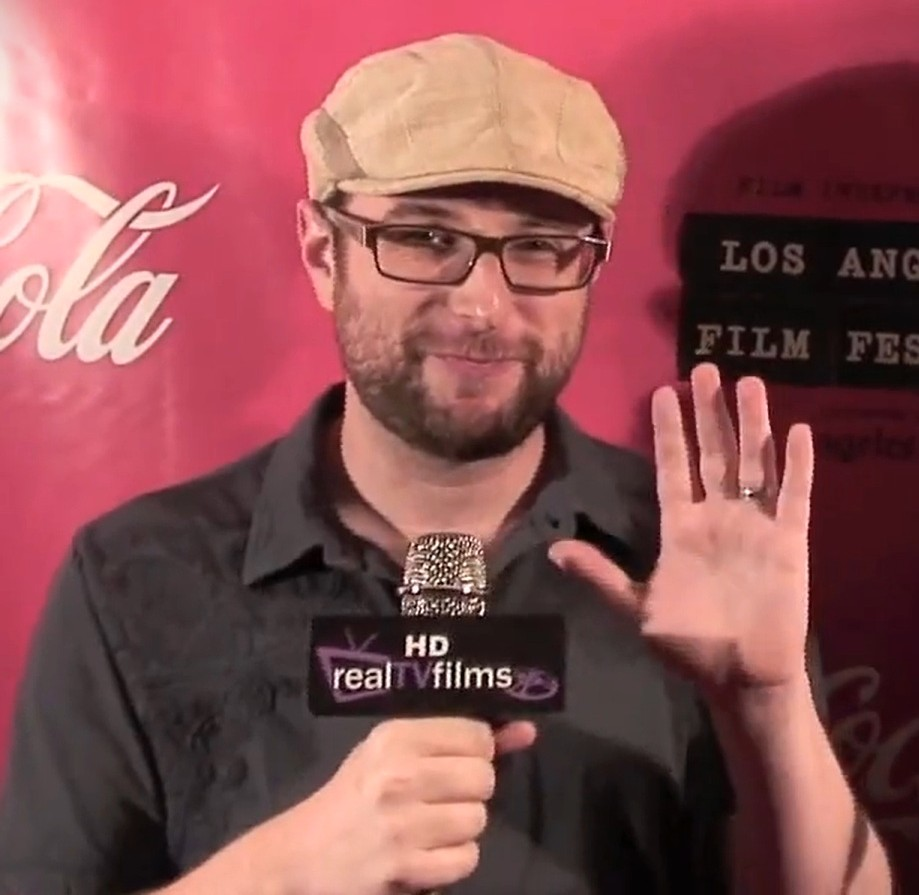
- Reid in 2010
- Occupation: Film director
- Known for: Hello Lonesome; The Adventures of Barry & Joe
- Website: www.adamreid.tv

Adam Reid is an American writer and film director and co-founder of Bodega Studios. His film Hello Lonesome won numerous film festival awards as well as a Film Independent Spirit Award nomination. He is also the author of the book The Adventures of Barry & Joe.

== Career ==
Reid got his start in the film industry with producing promotional videos for Comedy Central. is the co-founder of the production company and agency Bodega Studios where he has made commercials for brands such as M&M's and Lean Cuisine.

Reid's major directorial debut was Hello Lonesome, an indie film that he also wrote and produced. The film was shot on a budget of $50,000 and completed in 15 days. It won numerous awards including at the Los Angeles Film Festival and the Bahamas International Film Festival. Hello Lonesome was also nominated for a Film Independent Spirit Award.

Reid is also the creator of Barry & Joe, an animated series concept, featuring cartoon versions of Barack Obama and Joe Biden who travel through time. The concept was conceived the day after the 2016 United States presidential election, but Reid did not immediately pursue it thinking it was a "stoner idea." Reid launched a Kickstarter campaign to fund the project in August 2017, raising more than $100,000. Conan O'Brien has signed on to be one of the producers of the series.

Reid is also the author of The Adventures of Barry & Joe, a graphic novel based on the same concept as the animated series.

== Filmography ==
=== Film ===
Year	Title	Role	Notes
2005	While the Widow is Away	Writer, Director	Short film winner of numerous film festival awards and shortlisted for an Oscar nomination
2010	Hello Lonesome	Writer, Director, Producer	Winner (Audience Award) at Ashland Independent Film Festival; Winner (New Visions Award) at Bahamas International Film Festival; Winner (Best Screenplay) at BendFilm Festival; Winner (Jury Prize) at Los Angeles Film Festival; Nominated for a Film Independent Spirit Award

=== Other projects ===
Year	Title	Role	Notes
2007	She's Not There	Director	
2009	Just Like That	Director	
2011	The Understanding	Director	Music video for Jones Street Station starring Danny Pudi
2014	The Holiday Spirit	Director	
2015	Born on 9/11	Director	
2015	The Back Ninety-Nine	Director	
2016	Ken Bone's Fifteen Minutes	Director	
2022–25	The Tiny Chef Show	Creator	
