= Lion Forge Entertainment =

American production studio

- Type: Private
- Industry: Film; Television; Animation
- Genre: Kids & family; Young adult
- Founded: 2011
- Founder: David Steward II; Carl Reed
- Area served: Worldwide
- Key people: David Steward II (CEO); Stephanie Sperber (President & CCO); Edward Hamati (COO)
- Products: Feature films (animation & live-action); Television series (animation & live-action); Consumer products & franchise development
- Owner: Polarity
- Website: lionforgeentertainment.com

Lion Forge Entertainment (LFE) is an American production studio based in Los Angeles, California. It develops and produces live-action and animated films, television series for children, families, and young adults with diverse and multicultural themes.

== History ==
=== Founding ===
Lion Forge was founded in 2011 as Lion Forge Comics in St. Louis, by David Steward II and Carl Reed. It operated under the imprint, Comics for Everyone, and developed a library of intellectual property that was later adapted for screen productions.

In August 2019, Steward and Reed launched Lion Forge Animation, and its debut credit, Matthew A. Cherry’s short Hair Love, won the 2020 Academy Award for Best Animated Short Film.

=== Expansion and rename (2021–January 2025) ===
In July 2022, Lion Forge Animation received its first global series order for Iyanu, a 2-D animated fantasy series approved by Cartoon Network and HBO Max (now Max). In March 2023, co-founder Carl Reed departed to form Composition Media, and the company renamed itself as Lion Forge Entertainment; David Steward II remained in his role as CEO, and Edward Hamati continued as COO. Stephanie Sperber, previously an executive at NBCUniversal, was appointed President and chief content officer.

== Projects ==
=== Animation ===
- Hair Love (short, 2019): Lion Forge co-produced Matthew A. Cherry’s short film; won the 2020 Academy Award for Best Animated Short Film.
- Drawn In (short-form series, 2023): literacy-driven kids’ show created with Nine PBS; won the 2023 Mid-America Emmy for Short Form Content.
- Iyanu (series, 2025–present): premiered April 2025 on Cartoon Network/Max; Showmax Africa rollout June 2025; ITVX U.K. debut July 2025; renewed for Season 2 and two companion films.
- A Dozen Tough Jobs (feature, 2026): animated retelling of the Hercules’ twelve labors set in 1920s Mississippi; collaboration with George R. R. Martin announced May 2025.
- Iron Dragon (animated fantasy-adventure series, 2026): premiering in 2026 on Nickelodeon, co-developed with Nickelodeon Animation Studio and Canadian animation studio 9 Story Media Group, following two girls managing their new life in a multivitamin environment with a tiny dragon by their side.
- Marley and the Family Band (animated series, TBA): adaptation of Cedella Marley’s 2022 children's book, developed with Polygram Entertainment and the Tuff Gong Collective.

=== Live-action ===
- Best Wishes (film series, TBA): multi-picture adaptation of Sarah Mlynowski’s best-selling Scholastic novels; optioned March 2024, screenplay in progress.
- Lostlings (YA series, TBA): live-action adaptation of TalesVision’s mystery series with 17 million YouTube views; development deal signed June 2025.
- Secret Society of Rebel Girls (series, TBA), co-developed with Rebel Girls and DK Publishing, inspired by the Good Night Stories for Rebel Girls brand; announced May 2024.

=== Other projects ===
In addition to long-form programming, Lion Forge Entertainment has co-produced short-form projects such as the Disney+ musical short Rise Up, Sing Out and the animated series Young Love, a spin-off of Hair Love, which premiered on Max in 2022.

== Awards and recognition ==
Lion Forge's first animated short, Hair Love, received the Academy Award for Best Animated Short Film. Two years later, Drawn In, received a Mid-America Emmy for Outstanding Short Form Content.

In 2021, Fast Company named Lion Forge Entertainment on its annual list of innovative film and television companies.

The series Iyanu premiered as the #1 kids' program on Cartoon Network and was listed on Max’s Top 10 Kids & Family chart. The show also debuted on Showmax as the streamer’s most-watched Kids & Family title across 44 African territories.
