= The Zodiac (film) =

2005 film by Alex Bulkley

- Promotional movie poster
- Directed by: Alex Bulkley
- Written by: Kelly Bulkley; Alex Bulkley
- Produced by: Corey Campodonico
- Starring: Justin Chambers; Robin Tunney; Rory Culkin; Philip Baker Hall; Brad Henke; Marty Lindsey; Rex Linn; William Mapother
- Cinematography: Denis Maloney
- Edited by: Greg Tillman
- Music by: Michael Suby
- Production companies: ShadowMachine Films; Myriad Pictures
- Distributed by: THINKFilm
- Release dates: July 31, 2005 (München Fantasy Filmfest); March 17, 2006 (United States)
- Running time: 97 minutes
- Country: United States
- Language: English
- Budget: $1 million
- Box office: $86,872

The Zodiac is a 2005 American crime horror drama film based on the true events associated with the Zodiac: a serial killer who was active in and around Northern California in the 1960s and 1970s. The Zodiac was directed by Alexander Bulkley and co-written with his brother, Kelly Bulkley, and stars Justin Chambers, Robin Tunney, Rory Culkin, Philip Baker Hall, Brad Henke, Marty Lindsey, Rex Linn, and William Mapother.

The film was released on March 17, 2006, into just 10 theaters on limited release (with an R-rating by the MPAA) and later released on DVD in North America on August 29, 2006. The DVD hit the UK market on September 18.

== Plot ==
When two teenagers are gunned down on Lake Helena (in real-life, Herman) Road on December 20, 1968, the small town of Vallejo (Benicia) is thrown into a state of terror. Assigned to the case is Police Detective Matt Parish (Justin Chambers) of the Vallejo Police Department. With few leads, the case goes unsolved and the emotional attachment causes heartache for Parish's family; wife Laura (Robin Tunney) and 12-year-old son (Rory Culkin).

Six months later on July 4 – as Parish begins to lose hope – the Zodiac strikes again. This time he guns down a couple in a deserted parking lot. He's inches away as he pulls the trigger, but he never reveals his true identity. Just an hour after the shooting, the Vallejo Police Department receives an anonymous call, confessing to the murders that have just taken place. Days after the second murder, a letter is sent to Bay Area newspapers the San Francisco Chronicle and the San Francisco Examiner, threatening that 12 more people will die unless the three papers print the encoded letter they've just received. The killer reveals that if they can decipher the note, his true identity will be revealed.

It becomes an obsession for Parish to solve the case. He spends all his time with the coded sheet, sketches of the killer and psychological reports, putting strain on his family. The ever-increasing publicity pushes him to the edge. When Parish receives more anonymous calls and ciphered letters (some suggesting the threatening chance that his next victim could be one of Parish's family), he thinks he's got his suspect. Disobeying orders by Chief Frank Perkins (Philip Baker Hall) he goes in search of the killer. When he storms into the suspect's house, his allegations are shattered because the man has no relation to the murders.

The police later hear of more killings, but the case doesn't get close to being resolved. On April 24, 1978, ten years after the first reported murder, the Chronicle receives another letter:

I'm waiting for a good movie about me. Who will play me…? This is the Zodiac. I am now in control of all things.

The film ends with the statement that the killer has not been captured.

== Cast ==
- Justin Chambers as Det. Matt Parish.
- Robin Tunney as Laura Parish, Matt Parish's wife.
- Rory Culkin as Johnny Parish (son of Matt and Laura Parish).
- Shelby Alexis Irey as Bobbie, Johnny's girlfriend.
- Philip Baker Hall as Chief Frank Perkin, the Police Department's chief and is the head of the operations.
- Brian Bloom as Zodiac Killer (voice). His voice is heard throughout the film in phone calls and letters.
- Brad Henke as Bill Gregory
- Rex Linn as Jim Martinez
- William Mapother as Dale Coverling, a news reporter.

== Production ==
=== Development ===
The Bulkley brothers and producer Corey Campodonico all grew up in the San Francisco Bay Area, and wanted to use their history and knowledge of the location for their debut film.

In an interview with Rotten Tomatoes Alexander Bulkley said:

I lived in the Bay Area where he was somewhat of a local legend. Every town has a 'boogie man' and he was ours. The stories of the murders kept us kids awake at night.

Their main source of information was newspapers and media articles from the time. The decision was made to tell the story of the detective involved with the case and how it affected his family, rather than following the psychological path of the killer. The impact of the killings on the victims' families was avoided, due to the killer's perceived lack of interest in who his victims were.

The filmmakers' main challenge was to maintain the balance between facts and a fictional narrative:

For many people making films based on true stories, it is always tempting to veer off into the fictional world to satisfy story elements. It was very challenging to maintain the integrity of the true story. We had a certain amount of events that we knew had occurred to create the composite characters for the law enforcement officers. In the end I think we were able to achieve our goal and a lot of true crime fanatics will really appreciate the film.

Once the screenplay was complete, the filmmakers gathered investors to finance the project and made it ShadowMachine Films' first ever film production.

=== Filming ===
The filming lasted 23 days. The Zodiac was filmed on location in Vallejo, California, where the majority of the murders were committed.

== Soundtrack ==
The soundtrack contains some of the following pieces by Andy Williams, The Chambers Brothers, William S. Gilbert and Arthur Sullivan:

Track name	Artist	Writer	Track length (mins)
"With a Girl Like You"	The Troggs	Reg Presley	02:09
It's the Most Wonderful Time of the Year	Andy Williams	Edward Pola & George Wyle	02:47
Papa Noel	Brenda Lee	Roy Botkin	-
The Sun Whose Rays Are All Ablaze	William S. Gilbert & Arthur Sullivan	-	-
Trouble No More	Muddy Waters	McKinley Morganfield	02:39
Time Has Come Today	The Chambers Brothers	Joseph Chambers & Willie Chambers	11:00

== Critical reception ==
Rotten Tomatoes, which compiles mostly North American reviews, showed that just eight out of 31 reviews were positive, with the average critic's grade being 4.1/10. The website assessed the film as "rotten", with 26% of the reviews favorable.

Metacritic, a website that aggregates reviews of films, television shows, has five reviews of The Zodiac, and given a general score of 21/100. For each movie, the scores from each review are averaged (a weighted average). Metacritic was created by Jason Dietz, Marc Doyle, and Julie Doyle Roberts in 1999, and was acquired by Fandom, Inc. in 2022.

Despite Rotten Tomatoes and Metacritic giving less than favorable critical reviews, the film has received more positive reviews from users who have submitted their own reviews of the film on the two websites, with a 70% grade from Metacritic users.

The film received its highest marks of critical reception from IMDb, one of the internets prominent online databases of information related to films. With almost eight thousands reviews on the site, the IMDb score given to The Zodiac, is a 5.3 out of 10.
