= Charlie's Party =

- Directed by: Catherine Cahn
- Written by: Catherine Cahn
- Produced by: Andrew Cahn; Catherine Cahn; Jessica Lieberman
- Starring: Sabrina Lloyd; Kim Director; Chris Tardio
- Cinematography: Mitch Gross
- Edited by: Anita Gabrosek; Jonathan Rinehart
- Music by: Andrew Cahn
- Release date: 2005
- Running time: 79 minutes
- Country: United States
- Language: English

Charlie's Party is a 2005 American comedy film written and directed by Catherine Cahn and starring Sabrina Lloyd, Kim Director and Chris Tardio.

== Cast ==
- Sabrina Lloyd as Sarah
- Kim Director as Zoe Fields
- Mark H. Dold as Tom
- Eron Otcasek as Nick
- Nancy Ann Ridder as Jane
- Chris Tardio as Dylan
- Alissia Miller as Charlie

== Reception ==
Robert Koehler of Variety gave the film a negative review, calling it "a would-be comedy that suffers from a lack of energy and imagination."

Ann Hornaday of The Washington Post also gave the film a negative review, describing it as "derivative and overeager to both shock and please."
