= Hello Lonesome =

- Film poster
- Directed by: Adam Reid
- Written by: Adam Reid
- Produced by: Adam Reid
- Distributed by: Bodega Studios
- Release date: June 11, 2010 (LA Film Festival)
- Running time: 93 minutes
- Country: United States
- Language: English
- Budget: $50,000

Hello Lonesome is a 2010 American comedy drama directed by Adam Reid. It won numerous awards including at the Los Angeles Film Festival and the Bahamas International Film Festival. It was also nominated for a Film Independent Spirit Award.

== Plot ==
Hello Lonesome follows three different story lines that show the difficulties of making and maintaining human bonds.

The first story line is of Bill (played by Harry Chase), who lives alone in an apartment and is attempting to connect with his estranged daughter. The second is of Eleanor (played by Lynn Cohen), a widow who befriends Gary (played by James Urbaniak) after she loses her driver's license and needs him to drive her places. The third is of Gordon (played by Nate Smith), who begins a relationship with Debbie (played by Sabrina Lloyd) after meeting through an online dating service.

== Cast ==
- Sabrina Lloyd as Debbie
- James Urbaniak as Gary
- Lynn Cohen as Eleanor
- Harry Chase as Bill
- Nate Smith as Gordon
- Kamel Boutros as Omar
- Cathy Trien as Tabitha
- Dave K. Williams as Dean

== Production ==
Hello Lonesome is the first major directorial for Reid who previously produced shorts and commercials through his production agency Bodega Studios. The film was financed by Reid and shot on a budget of $50,000 and completed in 15 days.

== Release and awards ==
Hello Lonesome was released at major film festivals internationally. It won numerous awards including at the Los Angeles Film Festival and the Bahamas International Film Festival. Hello Lonesome was also nominated for a Film Independent Spirit Award.
