= ShadowMachine =

American animation studio and production company

- Second logo used from 2007 to 2015
- Industry: Animation
- Founded: 1999; 27 years ago
- Founders: Alex Bulkley; Corey Campodonico
- Headquarters: Los Angeles, California, U.S.
- Number of locations: 2
- Products: Films; Television series; Specials; Commercials; Music videos
- Website: www.shadowmachine.com

ShadowMachine is an American animation studio and production company specialized in film, television, commercials and music videos.

Since its early days producing the stop-motion animation show Robot Chicken, the company has been producing such shows as Moral Orel, Mary Shelley's Frankenhole, The Shivering Truth and Titan Maximum for Adult Swim. Afterwards, the company produced BoJack Horseman, for Michael Eisner's Tornante Company, starring Will Arnett, Aaron Paul, and Amy Sedaris, as well as Tuca & Bertie, starring Tiffany Haddish, Ali Wong, and Steven Yeun.

== Filmography ==
=== Films ===
Release date	Film	Director	Co-producers	Distributor
July 31, 2005; March 17, 2006	The Zodiac	Alex Bulkley	Myriad Pictures; Blackwater Films	THINKFilm
October 2, 2015	Hell and Back	Tom Gianas; Ross Shuman	N/A	Freestyle Releasing
May 24, 2019	Booksmart	Olivia Wilde	Annapurna Pictures; Gloria Sanchez Productions	Annapurna Pictures
December 9, 2022	Guillermo del Toro's Pinocchio	Guillermo del Toro; Mark Gustafson	Netflix Animation Studios; Double Dare You! The Jim Henson Company	Netflix
TBA	The Buried Giant	Guillermo del Toro	Netflix Animation Studios; Double Dare You!	Netflix
TBA	Bob the Builder	TBA	Metro-Goldwyn-Mayer; Mattel Films; Nuyorican Productions	Amazon MGM Studios

=== Television series ===
Year	Series	Creator(s)	Co-producers	Network
2005–12	Robot Chicken (seasons 1–5)	Seth Green; Matthew Senreich	Stoopid Monkey; Williams Street; Sony Pictures Digital	Adult Swim
2005–09	Moral Orel	Dino Stamatopoulos	Fragical Productions; Williams Street	Adult Swim
2009	Titan Maximum	Matthew Senreich; Tom Root	Stoopid Monkey; Williams Street; Tom Is Awesome	Adult Swim
2010	Mary Shelley's Frankenhole	Dino Stamatopoulos	Fragical Productions; Williams Street	Adult Swim
2013	Good Morning Today	David Javerbaum	The Jim Henson Company	Fusion
2014–16	TripTank	Various	Comedy Partners	Comedy Central
2014–20	BoJack Horseman	Raphael Bob-Waksberg	The Tornante Company; Boxer vs. Raptor	Netflix
2016	Greatest Party Story Ever	N/A	Four Peaks Media Group; Den of Thieves	MTV
2017	Jeff & Some Aliens	Sean Donnelly; Alessandro Minoli	Video Lou; Comedy Partners	Comedy Central
2018–21	Final Space	Olan Rogers	Star Cadet; Conaco; Studio T (Season 1); New Form Digital; Jam Filled Entertainment	TBS (season 1); Adult Swim (seasons 2–3)
2018	Dallas & Robo	Mike Roberts	N/A	YouTube Red
2018	The Shivering Truth	Vernon Chatman	PFFR; Williams Street	Adult Swim (season 1 only)
2019–22	Tuca & Bertie	Lisa Hanawalt	The Tornante Company; Brave Dummy; Boxer vs. Raptor (season 1); Vegan Blintzes (seasons 2–3); Williams Street (seasons 2–3)	Netflix (season 1); Adult Swim (seasons 2–3)
2019	Human Discoveries	Chris Bruno; David Howard Lee	Ninjas Runnin' Wild; Kirk J. Rudell Productions	Facebook Watch
2021–23	Ten Year Old Tom	Steve Dildarian	Work Friends LLC, Tomorrow Studios; Insane Loon Productions	HBO Max (season 1); Max (season 2)
2022	The Afterparty (episode 6 only)	Christopher Miller	Lord Miller Productions; Sony Pictures Television Studios; TriStar Television	Apple TV+
2022	Little Demon	Darcy Fowler; Seth Kirschner; Kieran Valla	Jersey 2nd Avenue; Evil Hag Productions; Harmonious Claptrap; Atomic Cartoons; FXP	FXX
2023	Praise Petey	Anna Drezen	Gorgeous Horse Productions; The Monica Padrick Company; Bandera Entertainment; 20th Television Animation	Freeform
2023–24	Clone High (seasons 2–3)	Phil Lord; Christopher Miller; Bill Lawrence	Doozer; Lord Miller Productions; MTV Entertainment Studios	Max
2023	Strange Planet	Dan Harmon; Nathan W. Pyle	Mercury Filmworks; Harmonious Claptrap; Nathan W Pyle; Apple Studios	Apple TV+
2023–25	The Tiny Chef Show (seasons 2–3)	Rachel Larsen; Ozlem 'Ozi' Akturk; Adam Reid	Imagine Kids+Family; Tiny Chef Productions; Dunshire Productions; Nickelodeon Animation Studio	Nickelodeon
2024	In the Know	Mike Judge; Brandon Gardner; Zach Woods	Oregon Film; Bandera Entertainment; Universal Television	Peacock
2025–present	Lil Kev	Matthew Claybrooks; Michael Price	Standing Room Only! Entertainment; King of France Productions; Hartbeat Productions	BET+ (season 1); Paramount+ (season 2)
2025–present	Long Story Short	Raphael Bob-Waksberg	The Tornante Company; Vegan Blintzes	Netflix
TBA
TBA	Galaga Chronicles	Roberto Orci	Bandai Namco Entertainment; The Nuttery Entertainment	N/A
TBA	Milepost 88	Mark Gustafson	N/A	N/A
TBA	Firefly	Tara Butters; Marc Guggenheim	Collision33; 20th Television Animation	N/A

=== Specials ===
Release date	Special	Co-producers	Network
June 17, 2007	Robot Chicken: Star Wars	Lucasfilm; Stoopid Monkey; Williams Street; Sony Pictures Digital	Adult Swim
November 16, 2008	Robot Chicken: Star Wars Episode II	Lucasfilm; Stoopid Monkey; Williams Street; Sony Pictures Digital	Adult Swim
December 19, 2010	Robot Chicken: Star Wars Episode III	Lucasfilm; Stoopid Monkey; Williams Street; Sony Pictures Digital	Adult Swim
December 19, 2014	BoJack Horseman: Sabrina's Christmas Wish	The Tornante Company; Boxer vs. Raptor	Netflix
May 13, 2018	Chuck Deuce	(failed pilot)	Adult Swim
November 26, 2021	5 More Sleeps 'til Christmas	Electric Hot Dog; Universal Television	NBC

=== Music videos ===
Year	Song	Artists	Label
2000	Last Time	Downer	Roadrunner Records
2011	End to the Lies	Jane's Addiction	Capitol Records
2011	Irresistible Force	Jane's Addiction	Capitol Records
2011	Narcissistic Cannibal	Korn	Roadrunner Records
2012	Put the Gun Down	ZZ Ward	Hollywood Records
2013	Xmas Town	Gummibär	Gummybear International
2014	Blue Moon	Beck	Capitol Records

=== Advertising ===
As the studio has grown, they have also taken on work with various advertising campaigns with high-profile clients such as Honda. It was also honored at the ADDY Awards for an ad campaign with Farmers Insurance, directed by Jed Hathaway.

Year	Category	Company	Advertisement	Agency	Director
2011	Online	Farmers Insurance	“Meet the Wongs”	RPA	Jed Hathaway
2011	Online	Farmers Insurance	“The Cat Burglar”	RPA	Jed Hathaway
2011	Online	Farmers Insurance	“Dude of Hazards”	RPA	Jed Hathaway
2011	Online	Farmers Insurance	“Le Petite Disastre”	RPA	Jed Hathaway

- Pinto Promos for Fuel TV
- Hallmark eCards (Can't Touch This)
  - Director: Rohitash Rao
- Happy Honda Days Shorts for Honda with Secret Weapon (2012)
  - Director: Jed Hathaway
- Snow White for Disney
- Lake Nona for GE with BBH L.A
- Verrado for Cecillian Worldwide
  - Director: Rohitash Rao
- Boost Mobile Don't Data & Drive for Boost Mobile with 180LA
  - Director: Rohitash Rao
- ENOS for Comedy Central Super Bowl Special
- Pinto for Fuel TV
- Happy Honda Days Shorts for Honda with Secret Weapon (2013)
  - Director: Jed Hathaway
- Red Velvet Oreo for Nabisco with 360i
  - Director/Producer: Jed Hathaway
- Glide for Oral-B with Publicis
  - Director: Rohitash Rao
- Farmers for Farmer’s Insurance with RPA
- Centaur and the Late Night Munchie Meal for Jack In The Box with Secret Weapon
  - Director: Jed Hathaway
- Fire House Subs for Fire House Subs with 360i (New York)
  - Director/Producer: Jed Hathaway
- Happy Honda Days Shorts for Honda with Secret Weapon (2014)
  - Director: Jed Hathaway
- The Work Revolution for Freelancer’s Union
  - Director: Rohitash Rao
- Boost Mobile ZTE Warp Sync for Boost Mobile with 180LA
  - Director: Rohitash Rao
- Omakase for Cartoon Network/Adult Swim with Cutaway Creative
  - Director: Jesse Selwyn
- Smores Oreo for Nabisco with 360i
  - Director/Producer: Jed Hathaway
- Happy Honda Days Shorts for Honda with Secret Weapon (2015)
  - Director: Jed Hathaway
- Subway for Subway with 360i (New York)
  - Director: Jed Hathaway
- Oreo for Nabisco with 360i
  - Director: Ben Bjelejac
- Red Nose for Walgreens and BuzzFeed
  - Director: Michael Langan
- Trolls for M.A.C.
  - Director: Tony Kelly
- A Christmas Carol for NBC Sports - SNF
  - Director: Jed Hathaway
- Nissan Star Wars
  - Director: Tony Stacchi
- Go Deeper for Newport Beach Film Festival
  - Director: Jed Hathaway

== Awards and nominations ==
=== Film ===
Award	Date of ceremony	Category	Recipient(s)	Result	Ref.
Hollywood Music in Media Awards	November 16, 2022	Music Themed Film, Biopic or Musical	Guillermo del Toro's Pinocchio	Nominated	
Los Angeles Film Critics Association Awards	December 11, 2022	Best Animated Film	Guillermo del Toro's Pinocchio	Won	
Washington D.C. Area Film Critics Association Awards	December 12, 2022	Best Animated Feature	Guillermo del Toro's Pinocchio	Won	
Chicago Film Critics Association Awards	December 14, 2022	Best Animated Film	Pinocchio	Won	
Utah Film Critics Association	December 17, 2022	Best Animated Feature	Pinocchio	Runner-up	
St. Louis Gateway Film Critics Association Awards	December 18, 2022	Best Animated Film	Pinocchio	Nominated	
Dallas–Fort Worth Film Critics Association	December 19, 2022	Best Picture	Pinocchio	8th place	
Dallas–Fort Worth Film Critics Association	December 19, 2022	Best Animated Film	Pinocchio	Won	
Florida Film Critics Circle	December 22, 2022	Best Animated Film	Pinocchio	Nominated	
Alliance of Women Film Journalists	January 5, 2023	Best Animated Film	Pinocchio	Won	
San Diego Film Critics Society	January 6, 2023	Best Animated Film	Pinocchio	Won	
San Diego Film Critics Society	January 6, 2023	Best Visual Effects	Pinocchio	Nominated	
Toronto Film Critics Association	January 8, 2023	Best Animated Film	Pinocchio	Runner-up	
San Francisco Bay Area Film Critics Circle	January 9, 2023	Best Animated Feature	Pinocchio	Won	
Austin Film Critics Association	January 10, 2023	Best Animated Film	Pinocchio	Nominated	
Golden Globe Awards	January 10, 2023	Best Animated Feature Film	Pinocchio	Won	
Georgia Film Critics Association	January 13, 2023	Best Animated Film	Pinocchio	Won	
Critics' Choice Movie Awards	January 15, 2023	Best Animated Feature	Pinocchio	Won	
Seattle Film Critics Society	January 17, 2023	Best Animated Feature	Pinocchio	Nominated	
Online Film Critics Society	January 23, 2023	Best Animated Feature	Pinocchio	Won	
Visual Effects Society Awards	February 15, 2023	Outstanding Visual Effects in an Animated Feature	Aaron Weintraub, Jeffrey Schaper, Cameron Carson, Emma Gorbey	Won	
Houston Film Critics Society	February 18, 2023	Best Picture	Pinocchio	Nominated	
Houston Film Critics Society	February 18, 2023	Best Animated Feature	Pinocchio	Won	
Art Directors Guild Awards	February 18, 2023	Excellence in Production Design for an Animated Film	Guy Davis, Curt Enderle	Won	
British Academy Film Awards	February 19, 2023	Best Animated Film	Guillermo del Toro, Mark Gustafson, Gary Ungar, Alex Bulkley	Won	
Hollywood Critics Association Awards	February 24, 2023	Best Animated Film	Pinocchio	Won	
Producers Guild of America Awards	February 25, 2023	Outstanding Producer of Animated Theatrical Motion Pictures	Guillermo Del Toro, Gary Ungar, and Alex Bulkley	Won	
Annie Awards	February 25, 2023	Best Animated Feature	Pinocchio	Won	
Golden Reel Awards	February 26, 2023	Outstanding Achievement in Sound Editing – Feature Animation	Scott Martin Gershin, Masanobu "Tomi" Tomita, Andrew Vernon, Dan Gamache, Dan O'Connell, John Cucci	Won	
Golden Reel Awards	February 26, 2023	Outstanding Achievement in Music Editing – Feature Motion Picture	Lewis Morison, Eric Caudieux, Chris Barret	Nominated	
Satellite Awards	March 3, 2023	Best Motion Picture – Animated or Mixed Media	Pinocchio	Nominated	
Cinema Audio Society Awards	March 4, 2023	Outstanding Achievement in Sound Mixing for a Motion Picture – Animated	Jon Taylor, Frank Montaño, Peter Cobbin, Tavish Grade	Won	
American Cinema Editors Awards	March 5, 2023	Best Edited Animated Feature Film	Ken Schretzmann, Holly Klein	Won	
Academy Awards	March 12, 2023	Best Animated Feature Film	Guillermo del Toro, Mark Gustafson, Gary Ungar and Alex Bulkley	Won	

=== Television ===
The studio has received a high level of recognition for their work in Television, including multiple Emmy and Annie Awards on behalf of the Academy of Television Arts & Sciences and ASIFA-Hollywood, respectively.

Year	Award	Category	Winner
2006	Emmy	Outstanding Individual Achievement in Animation	Sarah E. Meyer - Robot Chicken: Easter Chicken
2007	Emmy	Outstanding Individual Achievement in Animation	Thomas Smith - Robot Chicken: Lust For Puppets
2007	Emmy	Outstanding Individual Achievement in Animation	Sihanouk Mariona - Moral Orel: The Lord's Prayer
2008	Annie	Outstanding Character Animation In a TV Production	Eric Towner - Robot Chicken
2008	Annie	Best Directing in an Animated Television Production	Seth Green - Robot Chicken: Star Wars
2009	Annie	Best Voice Acting In a TV Production	Ahmed Best - Robot Chicken: Star Wars Episode II
2009	Annie	Best Writing in an Animated Television Production or Short Form	Robot Chicken: Star Wars Episode II
2009	Annie	Best Animated Television Production	Robot Chicken: Star Wars
2009	Emmy	Outstanding Individual Achievement in Animation	Savelen Forrest - Robot Chicken: Star Wars Episode II
2009	Emmy	Outstanding Individual Achievement in Animation	Elizabeth Harvatine - Moral Orel: Sacrifice
2010	Annie	Best Animated Short Subject	Robot Chicken: Star Wars
2010	Emmy	Outstanding Costumes for a Variety/Music Program or a Special	Jeanette Moffat - Titan Maximum: Went to Party, Got Crabs
2010	Emmy	Outstanding Short Form Animated Program	Robot Chicken: Full-Assed Christmas Special
2016	Critics' Choice	Best Animation Series	BoJack Horseman
