= Sabrina Lloyd =

American actress (born 1970)

- Born: November 20, 1970 (age 55); Fairfax, Virginia
- Occupations: Retired actress, artist
- Years active: 1988–2013 (as actress)
- Spouse: Ross Smith (m. 1997)
- Children: 2
- Website: sabrinalloyd.com

Sabrina Lloyd (born November 20, 1970) is a retired American film and television actress. She is known for portraying Wade Welles in the science fiction series Sliders, Natalie Hurley in the ABC sitcom Sports Night and Kelly Charles in Father Hood (1993).

== Early life ==
Sabrina Lloyd is the daughter of Judy Lloyd, who managed a title insurance company in Lake Mary, Florida. At age 12, she began her acting career in the role of Pepper in a Mount Dora production of Annie.

When she was in the 10th grade she participated in a student exchange program that allowed her to spend a year in Brisbane, Australia. She graduated from Lake Mary High School in 1989.

== Career ==
Lloyd moved to New York when she was 18 to pursue a film career. Her earliest work there was in industrial training films and TV commercials, including one for Eastpak backpacks. She made a guest appearance on an episode of Law & Order called "Intolerance". She signed with a new talent agent and started getting more roles in TV and film.

Her first important role in feature films was in Chain of Desire, and this was followed by her first starring role in Father Hood with Patrick Swayze. She appeared in the 1993 music video for the song "Iris" by The Breeders. Lloyd also made appearances on television, starring in the TV movies The Coming Out of Heidi Leiter, an episode of Lifestories: Families in Crisis and Love Off Limits, an episode of the CBS Schoolbreak Special.

In 1995, Lloyd played Wade Welles, one of the original four characters in the sci-fi TV show Sliders. In 1997, the show was picked up by the Sci Fi Channel, but Lloyd's contract was not renewed. She quickly landed a co-starring role as senior associate producer Natalie Hurley in the ABC sitcom Sports Night.

In 2005, she starred as Terry Lake on the television show Numb3rs, but she left after the first season. Her contract had an option to leave after the first season, and she chose to do so. Lloyd wanted to return to New York. In 2008, Lloyd was the lead actress in the independent film Universal Signs.

== Personal life ==
Outside of her acting career, she is an artist and has explored various media such as writing, painting and pottery. She has two cats named Lucy and Theodore and was a vegetarian for six years during the 1990s. In 2010, Lloyd studied creative writing at Columbia University.

In April 1997, Lloyd married Ross Smith. They lived in Uganda for two years (2009–2010), and adopted a little girl while living there. They moved to Italy and lived in Rome for four years, where they had a son, and subsequently relocated to Vancouver Island. Lloyd is retired from acting.

== Filmography ==
=== Film ===
Year	Title	Role	Notes
1992	Chain of Desire	Melissa	
1992	That Night	Jeanette	
1993	Father Hood	Kelly Charles	
2001	On Edge	Becky Brooks	
2001	Wanderlust	Amanda	
2003	Dopamine	Sarah McCaulley	
2004	Something for Henry	Anna	Short
2004	The Breakup Artist	Kara	
2005	The Girl from Monday	Cecile	
2005	Charlie's Party	Sarah	
2006	Last Request	Cathy	
2007	Racing Daylight	Vicky Palmer / Helly	
2008	Universal Signs	Mary	
2010	Hello Lonesome	Debbie	
2013	The Pretty One	Edith	

=== Television ===
Year	Title	Role	Notes
1988	Superboy	Betsy	"Bringing Down the House"
1989	The New Leave It to Beaver	Molly	"Shortcuts"
1992	Law & Order	Kate 'Katie' Silver	"Intolerance"
1993	CBS Schoolbreak Special	Sarah Thompson	"Love Off Limits"
1994	Lifestories: Families in Crisis	Heidi Leiter	"More Than Friends: The Coming Out of Heidi Leiter"
1995–97	Sliders	Wade Welles	Main role
1998–2000	Sports Night	Natalie Hurley	Main role
2000	Madigan Men	Wendy Lipton	Main role
2002	Couples	Annie	TV film
2003	Ed	Frankie Hector	Recurring role
2004	My Sexiest Mistake	Amy	TV film
2004	DeMarco Affairs	Jessica DeMarco	TV film
2005	Numb3rs	Terry Lake	Main role (1st season only)
2008	Wainy Days	Molly	"Molly"
