= Touch Surgery =

- Company type: Private
- Industry: Health informatics and medical technology
- Founded: London, United Kingdom
- Headquarters: London and New York City and Auckland and Sydney
- Products: Medical education Medical technology
- Website: Official website

Touch Surgery is a London-based health technology app from the medical technology company Medtronic. The app was first discussed in 2010. The Touch Surgery mobile app is a mobile surgical training platform designed to simulate surgical procedures and enable surgeons to access their case videos and data. As of June 2025, The Touch Surgery mobile app included surgical instructions for about 400 surgical procedures in 17 different specialties.

== Validation Studies ==
Touch Surgery app has been validated by over 30 independent peer-reviewed publications for its innovative approach to training surgeons virtually.

The McDougal principles of validation (construct, face and content) have been conducted by 4 research groups. Each of the groups belonged to a different procedures, surgical specialties and institutions. The first paper was from an orthopaedic team in London (UK), followed by a Plastic surgical team at Stanford Hospital in Stanford (USA) an oro-maxillofacial team at Mount Sinai in New York (USA) and a General Surgery team in Heidelberg (Germany).

Construct validation tests the ability of the simulator to differentiate between different experience groups. Content validation is the expert opinion of content within the simulations with focus on the accuracy of the anatomy, steps and use of instruments. Face validation is the subjective assessment of the platform as a training tool (face value). Statistical significance was demonstrated in all studies proving repeatability of validation irrespective of procedure, specialty and location.

Learning curves and knowledge transfer

Participants naive to Intramedullary femoral nailing and Touch Surgery were assessed on an exam paper created to assess their understanding of the surgical procedure. The participants then used the app for learning and regularly tested themselves on the app. Finally they retook the exam-paper to see how much they had learned. Mastery on the app took 6 consecutive repetitions. A significant rise in score was noted and scores rivaled that of the surgeons that validated the exam paper.

Training Efficiency

The cardiothoracic team at Stanford assessed medical students on their understanding of Cardiopulmonary Bypass (CPB) on a 25 question exam. The exam had been validated by five cardiac surgeons. The medical students were then randomly allocated to use either the text based resources or the Touch Surgery app. The students were allowed to use the resource for 45 minutes and then retook the exam on CPB. Baseline test showed that there was no difference between the two groups before intervention; however there was a statistically significant difference in the two groups after the 45 minute preparation session. This study demonstrated that Touch Surgery could outperform traditional text-based learning tools.

In another randomised controlled trial of skills transfer from Touch Surgery to laparoscopic cholecystectomy, the Touch Surgery app has proved effective for providing cognitive training in laparoscopic cholecystectomies to medical students.

== Microsoft Partnership ==
In October 2018, Touch Surgery (Digital Surgery) and Microsoft announced their partnership and their aim to make operations safer by using Microsoft Hololens. The company has been made an official Microsoft Mixed Reality Partner and is creating mixed-reality apps and programs for Microsoft HoloLens to help surgeons as they work.

== Safe Surgery 2020 ==
In January 2019, Safe Surgery 2020 and Digital Surgery launched their simulation training platform, Touch Surgery, in Tanzania to upskill surgical workers in Tanzania and East Africa. Safe Surgery 2020 is a collaboration of foundations, nonprofits, educational institutions and local governments who want to make surgery safe, affordable and accessible across the world.

Assist International, Digital Surgery and local health facilities and hospitals, including Kijabe Hospital in Kenya, have been collaborating closely to develop a series of simulation trainings for the most common procedures provided by primary facilities in LMICs, such as C-sections and hysterectomies. The simulations are developed specifically for surgical teams operating in low-resource settings to ensure the procedure is achievable with basic instruments. The simulation integrates the WHO's surgical safety checklist to reinforce the importance of following the checklist to improve patient outcomes. The Safe Surgery 2020 hospitals received in-person and tele-mentoring training, and education on the Touch Surgery app as well as practical tools such as tablets in each facility for continuous learning.
