= Chris Tardio =

American actor

- Born: March 29, 1973 (age 53); Brooklyn, New York, U.S.
- Occupation: Actor
- Years active: 2000–present
- Known for: The Sopranos, Ray Donovan, Daredevil & Younger

Chris Tardio (born March 29, 1973) is an American actor and writer known for his roles in The Sopranos, Ray Donovan, Daredevil, and Younger. Tardio is also a writer, producer, and photographer.

== Filmography ==
=== Film ===
Year	Title	Role	Notes
2002	Passionada	Gianni Martinez	
2002	Analyze That	Enormous Bobby	
2003	Ash Tuesday	Young Cop	
2004	She Hate Me	Franco Bonasera	
2005	Charlie's Party	Dylan	
2005	In the Mix	Angelo	
2009	The Hungry Ghosts	Brian	
2009	Another Round	Anton	Short
2009	The Peanut Butter Theory	Anton	Short
2014	Smoke	Jackie	Short
2014	The Last American Guido	Nick	
2014	4	Husband	Short
2015	The Radio	Uncle Steven	Short
2016	Coda	Harry	Short
2020	Worth	Frank Donato	
2022	Smoke	Jackie	Short
2022	Little Ukraine	Nathan	
2024	Jersey Bred	Vincent Napolitano	
2026	Killing Castro	Santo Trafficante Jr.	

=== Television ===
Year	Title	Role	Notes
2000	The Sopranos	Sean Gismonte	Recurring Cast: Season 2
2000	Sex and the City	Matt	Episode: "Boy, Girl, Boy, Girl..."
2000	Third Watch	Matt	Episode: "Kim's Hope Chest"
2002	Law & Order: Special Victims Unit	Mario Molinari	Episode: "Lust"
2003	Queens Supreme	Nick Lasco	Episode: "Case by Case"
2003	Law & Order	Officer Adam Brennan	Episode: "Suicide Box"
2004	As the World Turns	Dominic Ramsey	Episode: "Episode #1.12279" & "#1.12345"
2005	CSI: NY	Steve Dark	Episode: "On the Job"
2006	The Unit	Sgt. Pruitt	Episode: "Natural Selection"
2006	Without a Trace	Damon Winters	Episode: "Watch Over Me"
2007	NCIS	Kenneth Dixon	Episode: "Skeletons"
2007	Hustle	Johnny Maranzano	Episode: "Big Daddy Calling"
2007	Bones	Danny Valenti	Episode: "Soccer Mom in the Mini-Van"
2007	CSI: Miami	Terrence Kerr	Episode: "Chain Reaction"
2009	NCIS: Los Angeles	Walton Flynn	Episode: "Search and Destroy"
2010	Lie to Me	Hollander	Episode: "Teachers and Pupils"
2012	Justified	Partlow	Episode: "Measures"
2012	The Finder	Det. Curtis Gillespie	Episode: "Voodoo Undo"
2012	Hollywood Heights	Stu Cornell	Episode: "Max and Nora Go to Ojai"
2012	Blue Bloods	Kevin Carr	Episode: "Domestic Disturbance"
2013	Vegas	Hal Whitford	Episode: "Paiutes"
2014	Perception	Detective Gomez	Episode: "Dirty"
2015	Daredevil	Detective Christian Blake	Recurring Cast: Season 1
2016–21	Younger	Enzo	Guest: Season 3 & 7, Recurring Cast: Season 5–6
2017	The Blacklist: Redemption	Tasker	Episode: "Borealis 301"
2018	The Neighborhood	Charlie	Episode: "The Mezuzah"
2018–19	Ray Donovan	Danny Bianchi	Recurring Cast: Season 6
2020–23	Gravesend	Charlie	Guest: Season 1, Recurring Cast: Season 2
2021	FBI: Most Wanted	SAC Mike Fitts	Episode: "The Line"
2021	NCIS: New Orleans	Elias Watkins	Episode: "Once Upon a Time"
2021	Pose	Vincent Massino	Episode: "Something Borrowed, Something Blue"
2023–26	Power Book IV: Force	Lt. Bobby DiFranco	Recurring Cast: Season 2–3

=== Video Games ===
Year	Title	Role	Notes
2004	Grand Theft Auto: San Andreas	Mafia Gangster	Voice
2005	Grand Theft Auto: Liberty City Stories	Mickey Hamfists / Bikers	Voice
2005	The Warriors	Additional Civilian	Voice
2012	The Darkness II	Eddie / Edward	Voice
2012	Medal of Honor: Warfighter	Bravo Marine	Voice
2013	The Bureau: XCOM Declassified	Additional Voices	Voice
2016	Mafia III	Alex Ribaldi / Reporter	Voice
