= Alex Bulkley =

American animation producer and film director

Alex Bulkley is an American film and television producer and director. He is the co-founder of the animation studio ShadowMachine. He also directed The Zodiac (2005), a psychological thriller he co-wrote with his brother Kelly.

== Career ==
Bulkley has served as a producer on ShadowMachine's projects, beginning in 2005 with Robot Chicken and Moral Orel, and won the Primetime Emmy Award for Outstanding Short Form Animated Program for Robot Chicken's "Full-Assed Christmas Special" in 2010. He received two nominations for the Primetime Emmy Award for Outstanding Animated Program for the BoJack Horseman episodes "Free Churro" and "The View from Halfway Down".

As a producer on Guillermo del Toro's Pinocchio (2022), Bulkley has won the Academy Award for Best Animated Feature, and the BAFTA Award for Best Animated Film.

Awards won

- 2010: Emmy for Outstanding Short Form Animated Program for Robot Chicken: Full-Assed Christmas Special
- 2023: Oscar for Best Animated Feature for Guillermo del Toro's Pinocchio
- 2024: Emmy for Outstanding Preschool Animated Series for The Tiny Chef Show
- 2025: Emmy for Outstanding Preschool Animated Series for The Tiny Chef Show
