= Impact X =

British venture capital firm

Impact X Capital
- Type: Private Ownership, Limited partnership
- Industry: Venture capital
- Founded: 2018; 8 years ago
- Founder: Eric D. Collins
- Headquarters: London, United Kingdom
- Key people: Ursula Burns; Lenny Henry; Ric Lewis
- Products: Investments
- Total assets: £100 million
- Website: www.impactxcapital.com

Impact X Capital is a venture capital firm which looks to invest in underrepresented entrepreneurs from across Europe. Impact X Capital was started by Eric Collins. Its initial founding members include Ursula Burns, Ric Lewis and Lenny Henry.

== History ==
Impact X Capital was started in 2018 by Eric Collins. Its initial founding members include Ursula Burns, Ric Lewis and Lenny Henry. The venture capital (VC) fund was inspired by the lack of investment in companies led by people from underrepresented communities, with a particular focus on people of colour and women. At the time they were founded, less than 4% of VC funding went to teams led by women, and less than 1% to people of colour. As of December 2019, Impact X was raising a fund of over £100 million to invest in minority-led businesses. In March 2024, Impact X Capital Partners announced plans to raise £100 million for its second fund, with early backing from Bank of America, the Visa Foundation, and Atomico, to invest in underrepresented founders across sectors such as technology, healthcare, and media. In March 2025, Impact X Capital Partners ultimately announced the final close of its latest fund, securing backing from investors including Illumen Capital and Basecamp Fund.

== Team ==
The chief executive officer is Eric Collins, a tech entrepreneur and investor who previously served on Barack Obama's Small Business Administration's Council on Underserved Communities. Principal investor, Yvonne Bajela, was selected as one of Forbes 30 Under 30 in 2020. In April 2020, Paula Groves, founding partner, was selected as one of Europe's most influential women in venture capital. Principal investor and chief technology officer, Ezechi Britton was awarded ITA's venture capitalist of the year in 2019.

== Major investments ==
One of the first Impact X Capital investments was Predina, a smart navigation software which looks to prevent road traffic accidents. Predina was founded by Bola Adegbulu and Meha Nelson, and makes use of artificial intelligence to predict the safest routes for any car journey. Other investments include Quantum Dice, Salvo Health, and Laundris, according to the company.

== Brand name ==
In addition to Impact X Capital Partners, other companies have operated under the brand name "Impact X" in London across related sectors. These include a technology executive search firm and Impact X Partners, a financial advisory and investment platform that focused on advising institutional investors and mission-driven enterprises, particularly on projects aligned with the United Nations Sustainable Development Goals (SDGs).

The brand rights for the name "Impact X Partners" are registered with the United Kingdom Intellectual Property Office and the European Union Intellectual Property Office (EUIPO). These rights are held by Impact X FinTech Ltd under Class 36 of the Nice Classification, covering financial services such as investment management, venture capital, and sustainable finance advisory.
