= Kelly Bulkeley =

American author

Kelly Bulkeley (born 1962) is an American author and researcher in the fields of dreams and the psychology of religion.

A Past President of the International Association for the Study of Dreams (IASD), he is currently a senior editor of the APA journal Dreaming: The Journal of the Association for the Study of Dreams. He co-wrote the 2006 film The Zodiac, which had a limited theatrical release. His surname at birth was spelled "Bulkley", and it appears this way on this film. He is a descendant of Peter Bulkley, whose name also carries these two variant spellings.

Bulkeley currently lives in Portland, Oregon.

== Theories and stances ==
Bulkeley has compared dreams to a kind of 'play', in which different behaviours and strategies can be rehearsed. Nightmares, for example, may be warnings that a negative occurrence is possible, and we should be prepared for it.

== Publications ==
=== Books ===
- The Wilderness of Dreams: Exploring the Religious Meanings of Dreams in Modern Western Culture (SUNY Press, 1994).
- Spiritual Dreaming: A Cross-Cultural and Historical Journey (Paulist Press, 1995).
- Among All These Dreamers: Essays on Dreaming and Modern Society (Editor) (SUNY Press, 1996).
- An Introduction to the Psychology of Dreaming (Praeger, 1997)
- Dreamcatching (Co-authored with Alan Siegel) (Three Rivers Press, 1998).
- Visions of the Night: Dreams, Religion, and Psychology (SUNY Press, 1999).
- Transforming Dreams (John Wiley & Sons, 2000)
- Dreams: A Reader on the Religious, Cultural, and Psychological Dimensions of Dreaming (Editor) (Palgrave, 2001)
- Dreams of Healing: Transforming Nightmares into Visions of Hope (Paulist Press, 2003)
- The Wondering Brain: Thinking About Religion With and Beyond Cognitive Neuroscience (Routledge, 2005)
- Dreaming Beyond Death (co-authored with Patricia Bulkley) (Beacon Press, 2005)
- Soul, Psyche, Brain: New Directions in the Study of Religion and Brain-Mind Science (Editor) (Palgrave, 2005)
- American Dreamers: What Dreams Tell Us about the Political Psychology of Conservatives, Liberals, and Everyone Else (Beacon Press, 2008)
- Dreaming in the World’s Religions: A Comparative History (New York University Press, 2008)
- Dreaming in Christianity and Islam: Culture, Conflict, and Creativity (co-edited with Kate Adams and Patricia M. Davis) (Rutgers University Press, 2009)
- Dreaming in the Classroom: Practices, Methods, and Resources in Dream Education (co-authored with Phil King and Bernard Welt) (SUNY Press, 2011)
- Teaching Jung (co-edited with Clodagh Weldon) (Oxford University Press, 2011)
- Children’s Dreams (co-authored with Patricia Bulkley) (Rowman & Littlefield, 2012)
- Lucid Dreaming (2 volumes, co-edited with Ryan Hurd) (ABC-Clio, 2014)
- Big Dreams: The Science of Highly Memorable Dreaming (Oxford University Press, 2016)
- Lucrecia the Dreamer: Prophecy, Cognitive Science, and the Spanish Inquisition (Stanford University Press, 2018)
- The Scribes of Sleep: Insights from the Most Important Dream Journals in History (Oxford University Press USA, 2023)
- The Spirituality of Dreaming: Unlocking the Wisdom of Our Sleeping Selves (Broadleaf Books, 2023)
