= Stephanie Sperber =

American entertainment executive

- Occupations: Entertainment executive Television producer
- Years active: 1990s–present
- Organization(s): Imagine Entertainment (2019–2023); Universal Partnerships & Licensing (1996–2015)
- Notable work: The Astronauts (2020); The Tiny Chef Show (2022–); Bossy Bear (2023–24); The Slumber Party (2023); Iyanu: Child of Wonder (2024)
- Awards: Emmy Award nominee Annie Award winner (2022, 2024)

Stephanie Sperber is an American entertainment executive specializing in children's and family media.

== Career ==
Sperber began her career at Hanna-Barbera Cartoons.

In 1996, Sperber joined Universal Studios, where she worked until 2014. She became a founding executive of Universal Partnerships & Licensing (UP&L) in 2009 and eventually served as its president. She expanded Universal’s global consumer products, licensing, and partnerships, and headed the worldwide campaign for Despicable Me 2 (2013). She also launched Minion Rush.

After leaving Universal in 2014, Sperber founded White Space Entertainment. There she developed the Ugly Dolls feature film. She served as CEO of White Space Entertainment until 2019.

In 2019, Sperber became president of Imagine Kids & Family, a new division of Imagine Entertainment under Ron Howard and Brian Grazer. She executive produced The Astronauts for Nickelodeon, receiving an Emmy nomination, and The Tiny Chef Show, winning two Annie Awards (2022, 2024) and an Emmy Award in 2024. Other projects at Imagine included the animated series Bossy Bear for Nickelodeon and The Slumber Party film for Disney+, the latter earning an Emmy nomination in 2024.

In 2023, Sperber joined Lion Forge Entertainment as president and chief creative officer.

== Filmography ==
- The Astronauts (2020, Nickelodeon), executive producer
- The Tiny Chef Show (2022, Nick Jr./Nickelodeon), executive producer
- Bossy Bear (2023–24, Nickelodeon), executive producer
- The Slumber Party (2023, Disney+), executive producer
- Iyanu: Child of Wonder (2023, Cartoon Network/Max), executive producer
