= Annie Award for Best Animated Television Production for Preschool =

Annual US television award

- Awarded for: Excellence in television animation for preschool
- Country: United States
- Presented by: ASIFA-Hollywood
- First award: 2011
- Currently held by: Wow Lisa (2025)
- Website: annieawards.org

The Annie Award for Best Animated Television Production for Preschool is an Annie Award, awarded annually to the best animated television/broadcasting productions for preschool audiences.

== Winners and nominees ==
=== 2010s ===
| Year | Program | Episode | Studios | Network |
2011 (39th)
| 2011 (39th) | Jake and the Never Land Pirates | | Disney Television Animation | Disney Junior |
| 2011 (39th) | Chuggington | | Ludorum plc | CBeebies |
| 2011 (39th) | Mickey Mouse Clubhouse | | Disney Television Animation | Disney Junior |
| 2011 (39th) | The WotWots | Season 2 | Pukeko Pictures | TV2/The Hub |
2012 (40th)
| 2012 (40th) | Bubble Guppies | "A Tooth on the Looth" | Nickelodeon Animation Studio | Nickelodeon |
| 2012 (40th) | Chuggington | "Magnetic Wilson" | Ludorum | CBeebies |
| 2012 (40th) | Jake and the Never Land Pirates | "Peter Pan Returns" | Disney Television Animation | Disney Junior |
| 2012 (40th) | Doc McStuffins | "The Right Stuff" | Brown Bag Films | Disney Junior |
| 2012 (40th) | Justin Time | "Marcello's Meatballs" | Guru Studio | Family Jr. |
2013 (41st)
| 2013 (41st) | Sofia the First | | Disney Television Animation | Disney Junior |
| 2013 (41st) | Bubble Guppies | | Nickelodeon Productions, Nelvana | Nickelodeon |
| 2013 (41st) | Doc McStuffins | | Brown Bag Films / Disney Junior | Disney Junior |
| 2013 (41st) | Justin Time | | Guru Studio | Family Jr. |
| 2013 (41st) | Peter Rabbit | | Nickelodeon Productions and Silvergate Media | Nick Jr. Channel |
2014 (42nd)
| 2014 (42nd) | Tumble Leaf | | Amazon Studios and Bix Pix Entertainment | Amazon Prime Video |
| 2014 (42nd) | Doc McStuffins | | Disney Channel / Disney Junior | Disney Junior |
| 2014 (42nd) | Peter Rabbit | | Nickelodeon Productions and Silvergate Media | Nick Jr. Channel |
| 2014 (42nd) | Zack & Quack | | The Foundation, QQD Ltd, High1 Entertainment | Nick Jr. Channel |
| 2014 (42nd) | Wallykazam! | | Nickelodeon Productions | Nickelodeon |
2015 (43rd)
| 2015 (43rd) | Tumble Leaf | "Mirror" | Amazon Studios and Bix Pix Entertainment | Amazon Prime Video |
| 2015 (43rd) | Bubble Guppies | "Super Guppies!" | Nickelodeon / Nelvana | Nickelodeon |
| 2015 (43rd) | PAW Patrol | "Pups Save a MerPup" | Spin Master Entertainment, Nickelodeon Productions | Nickelodeon |
| 2015 (43rd) | Peter Rabbit | "The Kitten and Pig Adventure" | Nickelodeon Productions, Silvergate Media | Nick Jr. Channel |
| 2015 (43rd) | Sheriff Callie's Wild West | "The Good, the Bad & the Yo-Yo" | Wild Canary Animation / Disney Junior | Disney Junior |
| 2015 (43rd) | Transformers: Rescue Bots | "I Have Heard The Robots Singing" | Hasbro Studios | Discovery Family |
2016 (44th)
| 2016 (44th) | Tumble Leaf | "Mighty Mud Movers" / "Having a Ball" | Amazon Studios and Bix Pix Entertainment | Amazon Prime Video |
| 2016 (44th) | Ask the StoryBots | "Why Do I Have to Brush My Teeth?" | JibJab Bros. Studios for Netflix | Netflix |
| 2016 (44th) | Peg + Cat | "The Disappearing Art Problem" | The Fred Rogers Company, 9ate7 Productions | PBS Kids |
| 2016 (44th) | Puffin Rock | "The First Snow" | Cartoon Saloon, Dog Ears, Penguin Random House | RTÉjr/Netflix |
| 2016 (44th) | The Stinky & Dirty Show | "Squeak" | Amazon Studios and Brown Bag Films | Amazon Prime Video |
2017 (45th)
| 2017 (45th) | The Octonauts | "Operation Deep Freeze" | Vampire Squid Productions Limited, a Silvergate Media company, in association with Brown Bag Films | CBeebies |
| 2017 (45th) | Mickey and the Roadster Racers | "Goofy Gas!" | Disney Television Animation | Disney Junior |
| 2017 (45th) | Peg + Cat | "The Mariachi Problem" | The Fred Rogers Company, 100 Chickens Productions | PBS Kids |
| 2017 (45th) | The Stinky & Dirty Show | "Ha Ha Higher" / "The Waiting Game" | Amazon Studios | Amazon Prime Video |
| 2017 (45th) | Through the Woods | "A Snowy Morning" | Houghton Mifflin Harcourt, The Fred Rogers Company, PiP Animation Services | Curious World |
2018 (46th)
| 2018 (46th) | Ask the StoryBots | "How Do Computers Work?" | JibJab Bros. Studios for Netflix | Netflix |
| 2018 (46th) | PJ Masks | "Wacky Floats" | Frog Box, Entertainment One | Disney Junior |
| 2018 (46th) | Dinotrux: Supercharged | "Crabcavator" | DreamWorks Animation Television | Netflix |
| 2018 (46th) | Hey Duggee | "The Singing Badge" | Studio AKA | CBeebies |
| 2018 (46th) | Tumble Leaf | "Moonlight Mermaid" / "Hedge's Hatchlings" | Amazon Studios and Bix Pix Entertainment | Amazon Prime Video |
2019 (47th)
| 2019 (47th) | Ask the StoryBots | | JibJab Bros. Studios for Netflix | Netflix |
| 2019 (47th) | Elena of Avalor | | Disney Television Animation | Disney Junior |
| 2019 (47th) | Let's Go Luna! | | Brown Bag Films / 9 Story Media Group | PBS Kids |
| 2019 (47th) | Xavier Riddle and the Secret Museum | | Brown Bag Films / 9 Story Media Group | PBS Kids |
| 2019 (47th) | Norman Picklestripes | | Factory | Universal Kids |

=== 2020s ===
| Year | Program | Episode | Studios | Network |
2020 (48th)
| 2020 (48th) | The Adventures of Paddington | "Paddington Digs a Tunnel to Peru" | Blue-Zoo Animation Studio and Nickelodeon Animation Studio | Gulli/Nick Jr. Channel |
| 2020 (48th) | Buddi | "Snow" | Unanico Group | Netflix |
| 2020 (48th) | Muppet Babies | "Wock-a-bye-Fozzie" | Oddbot / Disney Junior | Disney Junior |
| 2020 (48th) | Stillwater | "The Impossible Dream" / "Stuck in the Rain" | Apple, Gaumont, Scholastic | Apple TV+ |
| 2020 (48th) | Xavier Riddle and the Secret Movie: I am Madam President | | 9 Story Media Group, Brown Bag Films | PBS Kids |
2021 (49th)
| 2021 (49th) | Ada Twist, Scientist | "Twelve Angry Birds" | Laughing Wild, Higher Ground Productions, Wonder Worldwide, Netflix | Netflix |
| 2021 (49th) | Muppet Babies | "Gonzo-Rella" | OddBot, Inc. | Disney Junior |
| 2021 (49th) | Odo | "Doddle Song" | Sixteen South and Letko | Channel 5/HBO Max |
| 2021 (49th) | Xavier Riddle and the Secret Museum | "I Am Ella Fitzgerald" | 9 Story Media Group, Brown Bag Films | PBS Kids |
| 2021 (49th) | Stillwater | "Crossing Over" / "Kind of Blue" | Scholastic Entertainment, Gaumont, Polygon Pictures in association with Apple | Apple TV+ |
2022 (50th)
| 2022 (50th) | The Tiny Chef Show | "Pancakes" | Tiny Chef Productions LLC, Imagine Entertainment | Nickelodeon |
| 2022 (50th) | Elinor Wonders Why | "Rest is Best" | SHOE Ink. LLC | PBS Kids |
| 2022 (50th) | Gabby's Dollhouse | "Cakey's Cupcake Cousins" | DreamWorks Animation | Netflix |
| 2022 (50th) | Spirit Rangers | "Thunder Mountain" | Laughing Wild, Netflix | Netflix |
| 2022 (50th) | Rise Up, Sing Out | "Name Tag" | Disney TV Animation | Disney+ |
2023 (51st)
| 2023 (51st) | Ghee Happy | "Navagraha" | Ghee Happy Studio | Ghee Happy Studio (Note: Released on YouTube.) |
| 2023 (51st) | Batwheels | "To the Batmobile!" | Warner Bros. Animation | Cartoon Network/Max |
| 2023 (51st) | The Creature Cases | "The Forest Food Bandit" | Silvergate Media/Team TO/Choice/Provisions/Netflix | Netflix |
| 2023 (51st) | Playdate with Winnie the Pooh | "Piglet, Tigger and the Cardboard Box" | Oddbot Inc. | Disney Junior |
| 2023 (51st) | StoryBots: Answer Time | "Fractions" | JibJab Bros. Studios for Netflix | Netflix |
2024 (52nd)
| 2024 (52nd) | The Tiny Chef Show | "Tiny Chef's Spooky Stump Spectacular" | Imagine Entertainment, Tiny Chef Productions, Nickelodeon Productions | Nickelodeon |
| 2024 (52nd) | Disney Jr.'s Ariel | "Crystal Cavern Caper" | Wild Canary Animation, Disney Branded Television | Disney Jr. |
| 2024 (52nd) | Gabby's Dollhouse | "Pandy's Bad Day" | DreamWorks Animation | Netflix |
| 2024 (52nd) | Jessica's Big Little World | "Jessica's Picnic" | Cartoon Network Studios | Cartoon Network |
| 2024 (52nd) | Wonder Pets: In the City | "Save Tate?" | Nickelodeon Productions | Apple TV+ |
2025 (53rd)
| 2025 (53rd) | Wow Lisa | "Rainy Day" | Punkrobot | YouTube |
| 2025 (53rd) | Eva The Owlet | "Welcome to Treetopington" | Brown Bag Films, Scholastic Entertainment in association with Apple | Apple TV |
| 2025 (53rd) | Kindergarten: The Musical | "Gotta Go!" | Oddbot Entertainment, Disney Branded Television | Disney Jr. |
| 2025 (53rd) | The Tiny Chef Show | "Tiny Chef's Spooky Stump Spectacular" | Imagine Entertainment, Tiny Chef Productions, Nickelodeon Productions | Nickelodeon |
| 2025 (53rd) | Xavier Riddle and the Secret Museum | "I am Jackie Robinson" | 9 Story Media Group, Brown Bag Films | PBS Kids |

== See also ==
- Daytime Emmy Award for Outstanding Pre-School Children's Animated Program
