= Children's and Family Emmy Award for Outstanding Preschool Animated Series =

Award for Outstanding Preschool Animated Series

- Awarded for: Outstanding Preschool Animated Series
- Country: United States
- Presented by: Academy of Television Arts & Sciences
- First award: 2022
- Currently held by: The Tiny Chef Show (2025)
- Website: theemmys.tv/childrens/

This is a list of winners and nominees of the Children's and Family Emmy Award for Outstanding Preschool Animated Series, which honors animated programs both in broadcast and streaming television aimed at young viewers from infancy through to age five. The category was established at the 1st Children's and Family Emmy Awards in 2022, and is a sister category to the Children's and Family Emmy Award for Outstanding Children's or Young Teen Animated Series, which honors shows aimed at older audiences.

The inaugural recipient of the award was Netflix series Ada Twist, Scientist. The current holder of the award is the Nickelodeon series The Tiny Chef Show, which won at the 4th Children's and Family Emmy Awards.

== Background ==
On November 17, 2021, the NATAS announced the creation of the Children's and Family Emmy Awards to recognize the best in children's and family television. The organization cited an "explosive growth in the quantity and quality of children's and family programming" as justification for a dedicated ceremony. Many categories of the awards were previously presented at the Daytime Emmy Awards. Animated programming aimed towards preschool children was honored from 2013 to 2022 with the Daytime Emmy Award for Outstanding Pre-School Children's Animated Program. Following the establishment of the Children's and Family Emmy Awards, this award was discontinued.

== Winners and nominations ==
=== 2020s ===
Year	Series	Producers	Network	Ref
2022 (1st)
2022 (1st)	Ada Twist, Scientist (Season 1-2)	Andrea Beaty, Mark Burton, Tonia Davis, Cathal Gaffney, Chris Nee, Barack Obama, Michelle Obama, Darragh O'Connell, David Roberts, Priya Swaminathan (executive producers); Kerri Grant (co-executive producer); Gillian Higgins (supervising producer); Nayanshi Shaw, Peedee Shindell (producers); Jean Herlihy (consulting producer)	Netflix	
2022 (1st)	Molly of Denali	Trevor Bentley, Dorothea Gillim (executive producers); Heather Renney (supervising producer); Anthony Bostler (coordinating producer); Yatibaey Evans, Princess Daazhraii Johnson (creative producers); Elizabeth Thorsen (producer); Courtenay Crane, Kassia O'Connor (line producers)	PBS	
2022 (1st)	Octonauts: Above & Beyond	Andrew Hymas (executive producer); Adam Idelson, Kurt Mueller, Stephanie Simpson (co-executive producers); Lacey Stanton (supervising producer); Frank Rocco (creative director); Greg De Winter, Kim Dent Wilder, Michael Hefferon, Steve Jacobson, Rachel Simon (producers); Susane Belec (line producer)	Netflix	
2022 (1st)	Santiago of the Seas	Tony Gama-Lobo, Niki López, Dave Palmer, Leslie Valdes, Valerie Walsh Valdes (executive producers); Michael Heinz (co-executive producer); Lauren Montgomery (supervising producer); Ian Murray (line producer)	Nickelodeon	
2022 (1st)	Xavier Riddle and the Secret Museum	Vince Commisso, Christopher Eliopoulos, Brad Meltzer, Fonda Snyder, Blake Tohana, Rob Weisbach (executive producers); Jennifer Bradley, Nora Keely (supervising producers); Meredith Kenny (producer); Cory Bobiak (consulting producer)	PBS	
2023 (2nd)
2023 (2nd)	StoryBots: Answer Time (Season 1)	Gregg Spiridellis, Evan Spiridellis (executive producers); Jeff Gill, Nate Theis (supervising producers); Jason Wyatt (producer); Sunisa Petchpoo (line producer)	Netflix	
2023 (2nd)	The Adventures of Paddington	Rosie Alison, Jon Foster, Ron Halpern, David Heyman, James Lamont, Anna Marsh, Lynsey O'Callaghan, Rob Silva (executive producers); Karen Davidsen, Simon Quinn (producers)	Nick Jr.	
2023 (2nd)	Spirit Rangers (Season 1)	Chris Nee, Karissa Valencia (executive producers); Marshell Becton, PeeDee Shindell (producers); Tra Nguyen, Charles Seignolle, Guillaume Villeneuve (line producers); Joey Clift, Kent Redeke (consulting producers)	Netflix	
2023 (2nd)	Star Wars: Young Jedi Adventures	Carmen Italia, Jacqui Lopez, Richard Marlis, Michael Olson, Josh Rimes, James Waugh (executive producers); Jeannine Hodson, Shea Wageman (producers); Brenda Dewet, Jennifer Rogan (line producers); Lamont Magee (consulting producer)	Disney+	
2023 (2nd)	The Tiny Chef Show (Season 1)'	Ozlem "Ozi" Akturk, Kristen Bell, Phil Chalk, Brian Grazer, Ron Howard, Rachel Larsen, Adam Reid, Morgan Sackett, Stephanie Sperber (executive producers); Hannah Ferguson (line producer); Jonny Belt, Robert Scull (consulting producers)	Nickelodeon	
2024 (3rd)
2024 (3rd)	The Tiny Chef Show (Season 2 Part 1)	Ozlem 'Ozi' Akturk, Kristen Bell, Alex Bulkley, Corey Campodonico, Leah Gotcsik, Brian Grazer, Ron Howard, Rachel Larsen, Adam Reid, Morgan Sackett (executive producers); Michael Kaufman (co-executive producer); Sara Crowley, Jason Wyatt (line producers)	Nickelodeon	
2024 (3rd)	Frog and Toad	Antonio Canobbio, Rob Hoegee, Ben Kalina, Adam Lobel, Adrianne Lobel, Chris Prynoski, Shannon Prynoski (executive producers); Jennifer Ray (supervising producer); Rachel Bepple, Sammy Rivkin (line producers)	Apple TV+	
2024 (3rd)	Interrupting Chicken	Clint Eland, Ron Holsey, Loris Kramer Lunsford, David Ezra Stein (executive producers); Chantal Ling (producer); Sarah Laight (line producer)	Apple TV+	
2024 (3rd)	Rosie's Rules	Vince Commisso, Mariana Díaz-Wionczek, PhD, Karen Fowler, Jennifer Hamburg, Wendy Harris, Natalie Osborne, Angela C. Santomero, Blake Tohana (executive producers); Charley Thomas (series producer); Natali Topalovska (line producer)	PBS Kids	
2024 (3rd)	StoryBots: Answer Time (Season 2)	Gregg Spiridellis, Evan Spiridellis (executive producers); Jeff Gill, Nate Theis (supervising producers); Jason Wyatt (producer); Sunisa Petchpoo (line producer)	Netflix	
2025 (4th)
2025 (4th)	The Tiny Chef Show (Season 2 Part 2-Season 3)	Ozlem 'Ozi' Akturk, Kristen Bell, Alex Bulkley, Corey Campodonico, Leah Gotcsik, Brian Grazer, Ron Howard, Rachel Larsen, Adam Reid, Morgan Sackett, Stephanie Sperber (executive producers); Michael Kaufman (co-executive producer); Sara Crowley, Jason Wyatt (line producers)	Nickelodeon	
2025 (4th)	Carl the Collector	Caroline Bandolik, Zachariah OHora, Heather Walker (executive producers); Scott Scornavacco (coordinating producer); Jesse McMahon (contact producer)	PBS Kids	
2025 (4th)	Daniel Tiger's Neighborhood	Vince Commisso, Ellen Doherty, Angela C. Santomero (executive producers); Christopher Loggins, Martin Sal (supervisor producer); Haley Hoffman, Ilene Louise Mitchell (producers); Arielle Reed Radack (associate producer)	PBS Kids	
2025 (4th)	Molly of Denali	Joel Bradley, Dorothea Gillim (executive producers); Heather Renney (supervising producer); Nicole Velez (senior producer); Anthony Bostler, Rayna Helgens, Elizabeth Thorsen (producer); Yatibaey Evans (creative producer); Elizabeth Thorsen (producer); Courtenay Crane (line producer); Sydney Hulstine (associate producer)	PBS Kids	
2025 (4th)	Xavier Riddle and the Secret Museum	Vince Commisso, Christopher Eliopoulos, Brad Meltzer, Fonda Snyder, Blake Tohana, Rob Weisbach (executive producers); Nora Keely, Coral Schoug (supervising producers); Natasha Daly, Susie Grondin (producers); Nicholas Marell (associate producer)	PBS Kids	

== Programs with multiple awards ==
2 awards

- The Tiny Chef Show

== Programs with multiple nominations ==
3 nominations

- The Tiny Chef Show

2 nominations

- Molly of Denali
- StoryBots: Answer Time
- Xavier Riddle and the Secret Museum

== Networks with multiple nominations ==
7 nominations

- PBS/PBS Kids

5 nominations

- Netflix
- Nickelodeon/Nick Jr.

2 nominations

- Apple TV+
