= Jeff Gill (animator) =

American animator

- Gill at the 2011 Digital Hollywood
- Education: Savannah College of Art and Design (BFA)
- Occupations: Animator; Director; Voice actor
- Years active: 2007–present
- Awards: 2019Daytime Emmy Award Directing in a Preschool Animated Program; Writing for a Preschool Animated Program

Jeffrey Gill is an American animator, director, and voice actor. He is best known for animating on the show South Park as well as his work with StoryBots in which he voices the character Bing. He directed the series StoryBots Super Songs and has won multiple Emmy awards for his work on Ask the StoryBots including Outstanding Directing in an Animated Program and Outstanding Writing for a Preschool Animated Program.

== Career ==
While attending the Savannah College of Art and Design Gill received national attention for various projects, including his 2nd place viral video "Wheee!" for the 2006 Firefox Flicks online competition.

After graduating in 2007, Gill moved to Los Angeles and worked for various animation studios including Sprite Animation Studios and JibJab. From 2008-2010 he animated for the television show South Park and contributed to many notable episodes, including the Emmy award winning Margaritaville. In 2011 he returned to JibJab as their Director of eCards where he oversaw the production of their online greeting cards, many of which included footage of him dancing. In addition to eCards, he also helped produce several of their animated shorts including political cartoons and Year In Reviews.

In 2014 Evan Spiridellis and Gregg Spiridellis began the children's entertainment brand StoryBots, and asked Gill to direct several educational animated music videos on topics such as Dinosaurs and Outer Space. Gill also provided several voices to these characters, as well as those in several other series including the singing squash, carrot, and turnip in the Vegetables videos.

In 2012 production began on Ask The StoryBots where Gill can be heard lending his voice to the character Bing, as well as many other secondary StoryBots. During this time Gill was also asked to direct a second series titled StoryBots Super Songs which combined the company's collection of music videos with new animated segments and live-action kid interviews into standard length episodes. In 2017 Gill co-directed A StoryBots Christmas with Evan Spiridellis.
