= A StoryBots Christmas =

2017 animated special

- Genre: Children's; Christmas
- Based on: StoryBots
- Directed by: Evan Spiridellis; Gregg Spiridellis
- Starring: Ed Asner
- Voices of: Judy Greer; Erin Fitzgerald; Fred Tatasciore; Jeff Gill; Gregg Spiridellis; Evan Spiridellis
- Composer: Gabe Sokoloff
- Country of origin: United States
- Original language: English

Production
- Running time: 24 minutes
- Production company: JibJab Bros. Studios

Original release
- Network: Netflix
- Release: December 1, 2017

A StoryBots Christmas is an American Christmas television special based on the characters from the digital educational program StoryBots and the original television series Ask the StoryBots and StoryBots Super Songs. It was created and produced by JibJab Bros. Studios (now StoryBots Inc.) and premiered exclusively on Netflix on December 1, 2017. It received six nominations for the 45th Daytime Emmy Awards and won two, including for Outstanding Special Class Animated Program.

The special features an appearance by Ed Asner as Santa Claus, a role he also played a few times in media such as the film Elf, Regular Show, and the television special Olive, the Other Reindeer. He received an Emmy nomination for the role.

== Plot ==
Bo mistakenly thinks that her friends do not like her gifts, so she heads to the North Pole to ask Santa Claus for help making awesome presents for her friends. She learns along the way that Christmas is about something far more than presents.

== Cast ==
- Judy Greer as Beep
- Ed Asner as Santa Claus
- Erin Fitzgerald as Bo
- Fred Tatasciore as Bang
- Jeff Gill as Bing
- Gregg Spiridellis as Boop
- Evan Spiridellis as Hap
- Nate Theis as Hub and Bub

== Reception ==
A StoryBots Christmas received positive reviews. Common Sense Media gave it a five-star review, calling it a "dynamic and positive special [that] highlights the importance of sharing time with loved ones during the holidays". The Star Tribune also named it a top TV pick and praised it as a "silly but charming animated special".

== Accolades ==
Award	Category	Recipient(s)	Result
Daytime Emmy Award	Outstanding Special Class Animated Program	Evan Spiridellis, Gregg Spiridellis, Meridith Stokes, Sarah Kambara	Won
Daytime Emmy Award	Outstanding Interactive Media Enhancement to a Daytime Program or Series	Gregg Spiridellis, Evan Spiridellis, Daniel Haack, Marc Geraldez, Greg Mako, Rafael Frensley, Sarah Kambara, Jeff Gill, Jacob Streilein, Nikolas Ilic, Logan Chang, Ian Gerstel, Philip Emokpare, Dave Baer, Suruchi Shingre, Phillip Lamplugh, Samrod Shenassa, Blake Petetan	Nominated
Daytime Emmy Award	Outstanding Performer in a Children's, Preschool Children's or Educational and Informational Program	Ed Asner	Nominated
Daytime Emmy Award	Outstanding Writing in a Preschool Animated Program	Evan Spiridellis, Gregg Spiridellis, Nate Theis	Nominated
Daytime Emmy Award	Outstanding Directing in a Preschool Animated Program	Evan Spiridellis, Jeff Gill	Won
Daytime Emmy Award	Outstanding Sound Editing for a Preschool Animated Program	Jeffrey Shiffman, Nicholas J. Ainsworth, Kevin Hart, James Singleton, Jacob Cook	Nominated

== Music ==
A StoryBots Christmas: Music from the Original Special was released on December 8, 2017 on all major digital music platforms, including iTunes, Spotify, Apple Music and Amazon Music. The music release includes the original song "Sharing Christmas (With the Ones You Love)" from the television special, as well as "Crazy for Christmastime" from the StoryBots short-form video.
