= StoryBots Super Songs =

- Genre: Children's television; Educational; Surreal comedy; Family edu-comedy; Sketch Comedy
- Created by: Evan Spiridellis; Gregg Spiridellis
- Based on: StoryBots
- Voices of: Judy Greer; Jeff Gill; Fred Tatasciore; Gregg Spiridellis; Erin Fitzgerald; Evan Spiridellis
- Theme music composer: Parry Gripp
- Original language: English
- No. of seasons: 1
- No. of episodes: 10

Production
- Production company: JibJab Bros. Studios

Original release
- Network: Netflix YouTube (under YouTube Kids)
- Release: October 7, 2016 – August 2, 2017

Related
- Ask the StoryBots; A StoryBots Christmas

StoryBots Super Songs is an American animated children's television series based on the characters from the StoryBots educational apps and videos. It was produced by JibJab Productions. Episodes have also been released in full monthly on StoryBots' official YouTube channel.

StoryBots Super Songs serves as a companion show to Ask the StoryBots, the inaugural television series in the StoryBots franchise, which premiered on August 12, 2016, also on Netflix.

== Plot ==
StoryBots Super Songs centers on the StoryBots, who are curious little creatures who live in the world beneath our screens. However, while its predecessor Ask the StoryBots follows Beep, Bing, Bang, Boop and Bo as they answer a child's single question (like "why is the sky blue?"), the music-centric Super Songs has the characters exploring broader subject areas.

"From the day Ask the StoryBots launched back in August, we’ve been inundated with requests from kids, parents and teachers all over the world for more episodes", said show co-creator Gregg Spiridellis. "We’re happy to be able to answer that call in a fun, new way with StoryBots Super Songs."

== Cast ==
- Judy Greer as Beep Boppalot, the main protagonist, a green StoryBot.
- Jeff Gill as Bing Badaboom, a yellow StoryBot.
- Fred Tatasciore as Bangford "Bang" Bibblebop III, a blue StoryBot.
- Gregg Spiridellis as Boop Bunklebee, a red StoryBot.
- Erin Fitzgerald as Bolina "Bo" Bumblefoot, a purple StoryBot.
- Evan Spiridellis as Harry "Hap" Hacklebee, an olive green StoryBot.

== Episodes ==
The series premiered with 10 episodes. Each episode focuses on one topic:

No.	Title	Original release date
1	"Outer Space"	October 7, 2016
2	"Body Parts"	November 15, 2016
3	"Dinosaurs"	December 16, 2016
4	"Vehicles"	January 27, 2017
5	"Shapes"	February 23, 2017
6	"Colors"	March 9, 2017
7	"Animals"	April 21, 2017
8	"Emotions"	May 9, 2017
9	"Professions"	June 15, 2017
10	"Barnyard Animals"	August 2, 2017

== Reception ==
StoryBots Super Songs was rated "excellent" by the Brigham Young University's Children's Book & Media Review, which noted that the StoryBots "present interesting, complex, and sometimes goofy pieces of information together in a simple, entertaining, and memorable way that children will appreciate," while "the different mix of animation styles and live action in this TV show will keep children on the edge of their seats."
