= Jeff Gill =

Jeff Gill may refer to:

- Jeff Gill (academic)
- Jeff Gill (animator)
