= Ethel's Club =

- Company type: Private
- Industry: co-working space, social club
- Founded: January 1, 2019; 6 years ago in Brooklyn, New York, United States
- Founder: Naj Austin
- Website: www.ethelsclub.com

Ethel's Club is a social club and co-working space located in Brooklyn, New York. Founded by Naj Austin in 2019, it was developed to serve people of color and allies.

== Background ==
The Wing is one of the best known co-working spaces targeted at women. Ethel's Club founder and CEO Najla Austin stated in an interview that The Wing is targeted at, "a certain type of woman, which, from my point of view, is not for me." A former member of WeWork, she stated that the organization had few other black members.

After finding few resources during her search for a Black woman therapist, she developed the idea to found a wellness club for "people of color and allies". It is named after Austin's grandmother, Ethel. Austin received $1,000,000 in pre-seed funding from ten investors including Roxane Gay, Hannibal Buress, Katie Stanton, and Liz Fong-Jones.

== History ==
Ethel's Club had a soft opening in November 2018, and officially opened at its location in Williamsburg, Brooklyn on January 1, 2019. As of March 2020, the business has approximately 200 members.

Ethel's Club offers co-working space and events for members, with a focus on emotional health and wellness. Members pay a monthly fee to access the club's resources at two different membership levels. The organization also maintains a code of conduct for members. It is one of 56 minority-owned co-working spaces in the United States.

The interior designer is Shannon Maldonado. She designed the space with the idea of a "cool" grandma in mind, a nod to the club's namesake.

Ethel's Club developed digital memberships and created virtual events in response to social distancing requirements resulting from COVID-19.
