= Google Moderator =

Google service (2008–2015)

- Website type: Issue tracking system
- Owner: Google
- Creators: Dave S. Young, Ashley Cadd, Taliver Heath, and Colby Ranger
- Commercial: No
- Registration: Required
- Launched: September 2008
- Current status: Discontinued as of June 30, 2015
- Content license: Proprietary

Google Moderator was a Google service that used crowdsourcing to rank user-submitted questions, suggestions and ideas. It was launched on September 25, 2008 and shut down on June 30, 2015. The service allowed the management of feedback from a large number of people, who could vote for questions they thought should be posed from a pool of questions submitted by others or submit their own to be asked and voted on. The service aimed to ensure that every question was considered, let the audience see others' questions, and helped the moderator of a team or event address the questions that the audience most cared about. The service was internally nicknamed Dory at Google, a reference to "the fish who asked questions all the time in Finding Nemo".

Google Moderator was developed by Google engineers Dave S. Young, Taliver Heath, and Colby Ranger in their 20% time, led by project manager Katie Jacobs Stanton.

In December 2008, Google Moderator was used by the President-elect Barack Obama's transition team in a public series called "Open for Questions", in which they answered questions from the general public. The first series ran for less than 48 hours and attracted 1 million votes from 20,000 people on 10,000 questions. The second series ran for just over a week and attracted 4.7 million votes from 100,000 people on 76,000 questions. In January 2009, Obama appointed Stanton to the newly created position of Director of Citizen Participation.

Google Moderator was shut down on June 30, 2015, because the usage did not meet Google's expectations.
