= Naj Austin =

American business executive

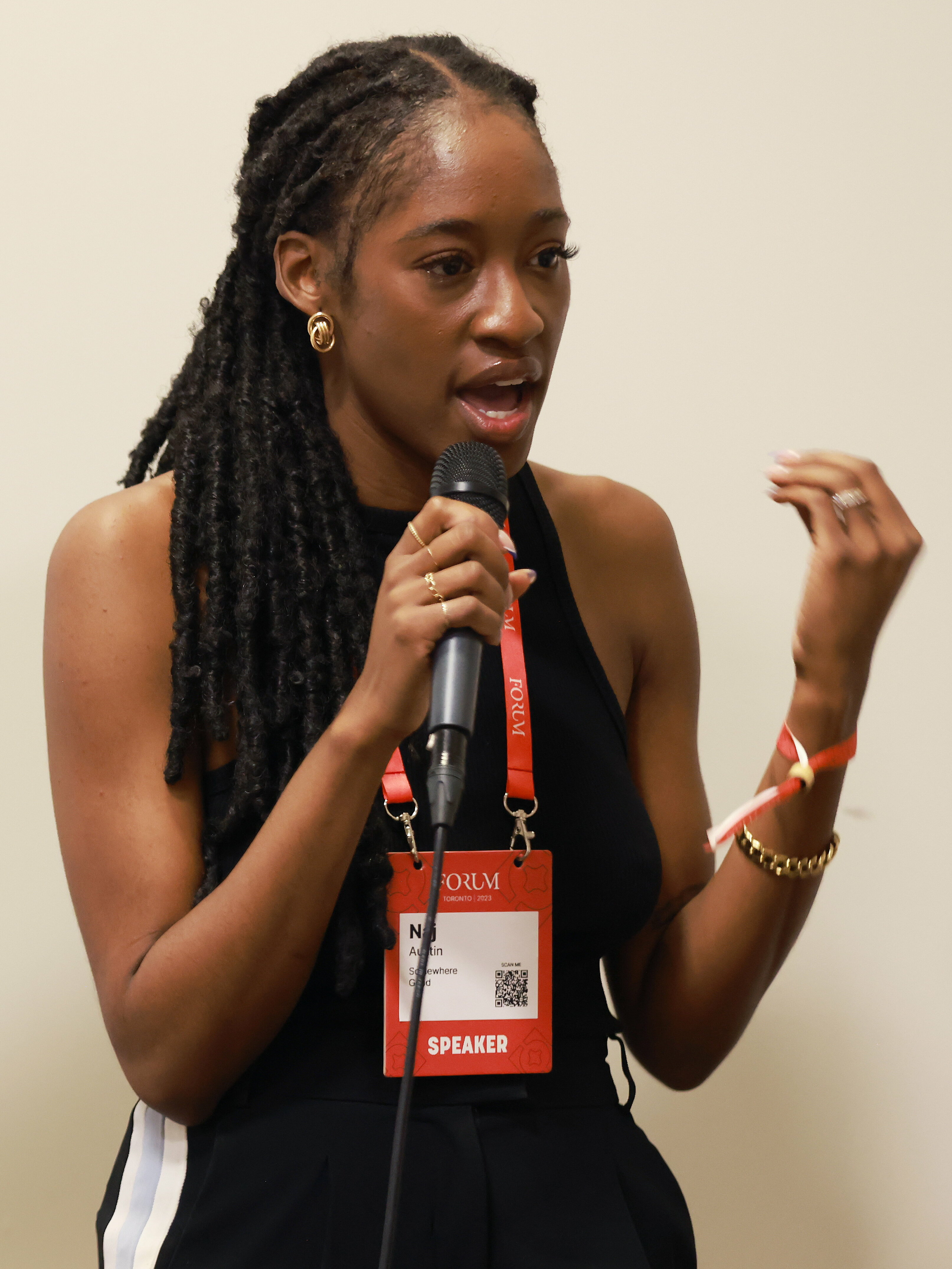
- Austin in 2023
- Born: Najla Austin
- Occupations: Founder, tech executive
- Years active: 2019–present
- Known for: Ethel's Club

Najla Austin is an American business executive. She is the founder and CEO of the wellness social club Ethel's Club and the social networking platform Somewhere Good.

== Career ==
Austin began her career in real estate. She decided to found a social club and co-working space for people of color based in Williamsburg, Brooklyn, after she had trouble finding a Black woman therapist. In January 2019, she posted on Instagram to gauge potential interest in the social club and garnered a waiting list of 4,000 people. She founded Ethel's Club shortly after. She used the crowdfunding website iFundWomen to raise $26,000 to finance start-up costs and opened the club on January 1, 2019 in Brooklyn. The business is named after Austin's late grandmother, Ethel Lucas, who was an active community organizer known for her social gatherings. The club, which now has a digital platform, has about 1,500 members as of December 2020.

In October 2020, Austin was selected to speak for the Time100 Talks series curated by Meghan Markle and Prince Harry.

Austin launched a beta version of the social networking platform Somewhere Good in January 2021. She received $3.75 million in seed funding to build the app. It is also oriented to people of color and will have moderators and a member code of conduct. Austin also launched the brand Form No Form, a 24-hour film platform.

== Personal life ==
Austin resides in Brooklyn. Austin has five siblings including Mujai Austin.

== Accolades ==
- 2019 – Inc., Female Founders 100
- 2020 –Time Out New York's Women of the Year
