= Erin Fitzgerald =

Canadian voice actress

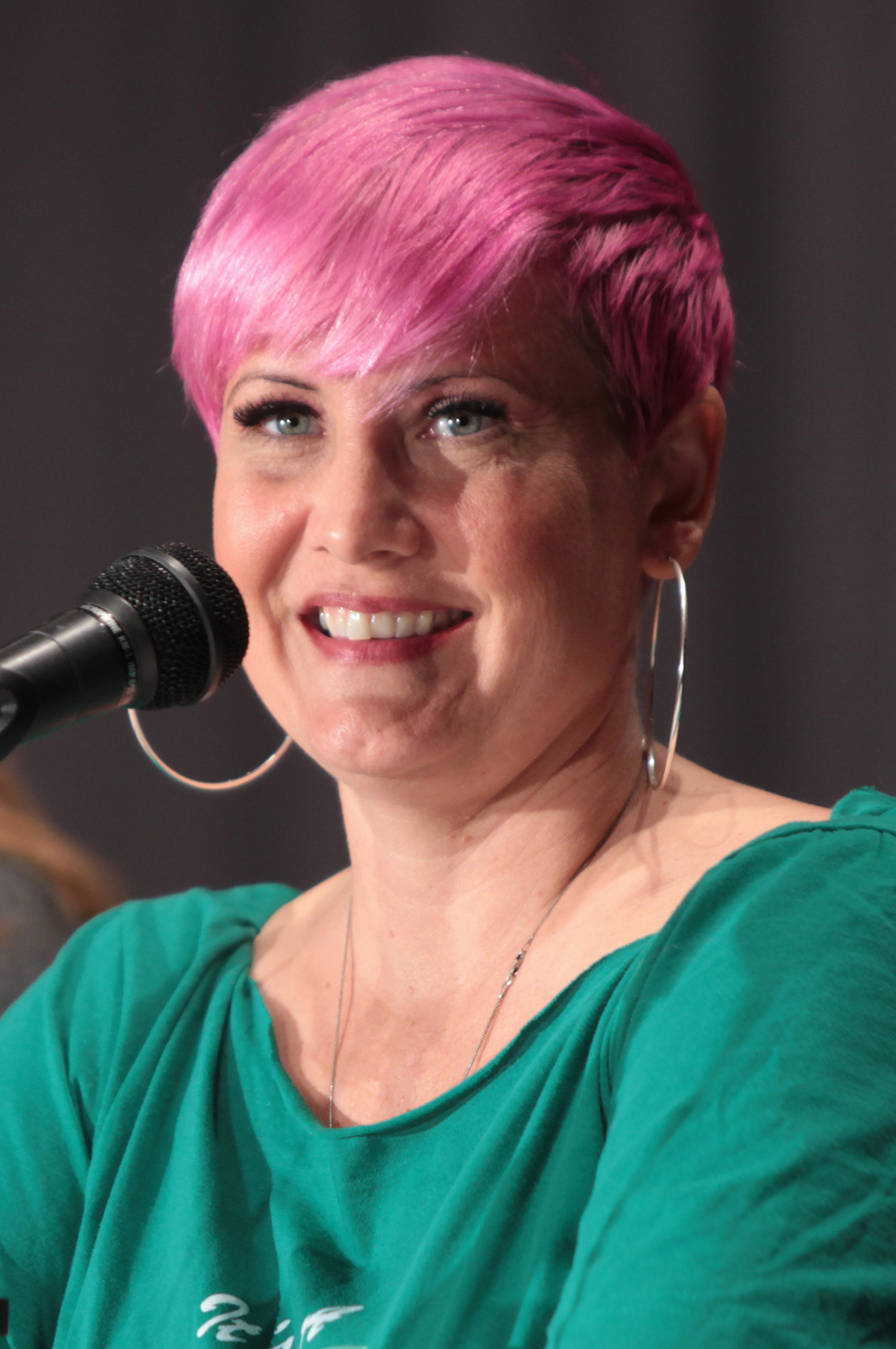
- Fitzgerald in 2017
- Born: Victoria, British Columbia, Canada
- Education: University of Victoria
- Occupation: Voice actress
- Years active: 1995–present
- Website: erinfitzvo.com

Erin Fitzgerald is a Canadian voice actress who provides voice-overs for a number of cartoons, video games and English language dubs of Japanese anime. In animation, she (Note: Fitzgerald uses she/her and they/them pronouns. This article uses she/her pronouns for consistency.) voices Raven Queen in Ever After High and C.A. Cupid in both Monster High and Ever After High. In recent roles, she voices Bo and other characters in the American children's educational show Ask the StoryBots on Netflix.

== Biography ==
Fitzgerald was born in Victoria, British Columbia and graduated from the University of Victoria with a Bachelor of Fine Arts, with an acting specialization. She moved to Vancouver and worked with local theater groups doing plays, radio plays, television, and film. Her voice-over career began with loops groups in Vancouver for shows such as The Outer Limits, she worked in looping for six years. Fitzgerald moved to Los Angeles in 2000. While in Los Angeles, she regularly works with a Christmas charity called Combat Radio.

== Career ==
She had her first start in voice acting as Piranha Mae Hoover in Fat Dog Mendoza while in Vancouver. Her first major animated role was as Nazz and May Kanker in the long-running Cartoon Network series Ed, Edd n Eddy. After seeing how she would be a regular on the show she would move to Los Angeles for more opportunities. She has had roles in other cartoons such as Sabrina: The Animated Series, The Jungle Bunch to the Rescue, Fat Dog Mendoza, Monster High, A.T.O.M., Dragon Tales and Rainbow Fish. In 2012, she replaced Tracey Rooney as the voice for Chie Satonaka in the Persona 4 series.

Fitzgerald would provide various voices for fashion doll franchises such as the 2010 web series Monster High and Ever After High in 2013.

Her current roles include Ask the StoryBots, which has won 5 Daytime Emmy Awards and 16 nominations including winning 2 Annie Awards, as Bo and various other characters, as well as lending her singing voice for Let's Go Luna! as Luna.

She also does theater work where she would do one-woman shows such as The Wizard of Oz.

== Personal life ==
Fitzgerald came out as pansexual on National Coming Out Day 2020.

== Selected filmography ==
=== Animation ===
List of voice performances in animation
Year	Title	Role	Notes	Source
1999	Sabrina: The Animated Series	Malissa, Ramona, others	Over 60 characters, grouped under "Also Starring"	Resume
1999–2000, 2002–2009	Ed, Edd n Eddy	Nazz / May Kanker		Resume
1999–2000	Dragon Tales	Windy, Pooky, Hoppy, others		Resume
2000	Rainbow Fish	Salmontha, Girly Girl		Resume
2000–01	Fat Dog Mendoza	Piranha Mae Hoover		Resume
2000–02	Troll Tales	Mermaid		Resume
2007–08	El Chavo Animado	Phoebe and Gordon	Eps. 52–135	Resume
2008	Batgirl: Year One	Black Canary, Vicky Vale, others	Also motion comic	
2010–2015	Monster High	Abbey Bominable, Spectra Vondergeist, Rochelle Goyle, Wydowna Spider, Scarah Screams, C.A. Cupid	Web series	
2011	Polly Pocket	Shani, Lea		Resume
2012–15	Wild Grinders	Stubford, Denise, Patti		Resume
2013–2015	Hubert & Takako	Jennifer, Nat, others	TV series	Website
2013–2016	Ever After High	Raven Queen, C.A. Cupid, Gus Crumb, others	Web series	Resume
2014	Lego Friends	Lila		Resume
2014–2020	The Jungle Bunch	Batricia	TV series	Website
2015	Miraculous: Tales of Ladybug & Cat Noir	Rose, Juleka	Grouped under Additional Voices	Tweet
2015–2016	Whisker Heaven Tales with the Palace Pets	Voice		Resume
2016–2019	Ask the StoryBots	Bo, Eardrum, Stapes, Roxy, The Queen, Mrs. Recorder, Venus, Saturn, Ms. Polymerase, Angry Annie, Ms. Microphone, Ms. Yeast	Netflix series, also StoryBots Super Songs	Website
2017–2018	We Bare Bears	Ranger/Mom		Resume
2019–2022	Let's Go Luna!	Luna (singing voice)	Replaces Judy Greer as her singing voice	Resume
2021	Long Gone Gulch	Marigold	Also executive producer	
2022	Super Silly Stories with Bo	Bo		

=== Anime ===
List of voice performances in anime
Year	Title	Role	Notes	Source
1999	Ranma ½	Kodachi Kuno	Season 5	CA
1999	Saber Marionette R	Cherry		CA
2000	Flint the Time Detective	Soara, Linda		Resume
2001	Saber Marionette J	Cherry, Luchs	Eps. 1–13	CA
2007–2011	Bleach	Various characters		Resume
2010	Bludgeoning Angel Dokuro-Chan	Yuko, Tanabe, Princess		Resume
2011	Kekkaishi	Atora Hanashima		Resume
2011	Mazinkaiser SKL	Tsubasa Yuuki		Resume
2011–14	Naruto Shippuden	Guren, Tokiwa (ep. 235)		Resume
2012	Persona 4: The Animation	Chie Satonaka		
2012	K	Chiho Hyuga		
2013	Beast Saga	Kumamoni Boy, Townswoman		Resume
2013	Zetman	Hanako Tanaka		Resume
2013	Pokemon Origins	Various characters		Resume
2013–14	B-Daman CrossFire	Kaito Samejima, Riki's Mother		
2014	Knights of Sidonia	Mozuku Kunato, others		Resume
2014–15	Sailor Moon series	Eudial (Sailor Moon S), Ramua, Shakoukai, Sonoko Ijuuin/Sailor Leaguer, Stewardesses/Sailor Stewardesses, others	Viz Media dub	Facebook
2015	Hyperdimension Neptunia: The Animation	Noire		
2015	Sailor Moon Crystal	Ghost Bride, Newscaster Izonol, Eudial		Resume
2015	Glitter Force	Harriet, Hannah		Website
2016	Danganronpa 3: The End of Hope's Peak High School	Seiko Kimura		

=== Animated films ===
List of voice performances in direct-to-video and television films
Year	Title	Role	Source
2006	Funky Monkey presents Music Time	Playtime Leader	Linkedin
2009	Ed, Edd n Eddy's Big Picture Show	Nazz and May Kanker	Website
2011	Dead Space: Aftermath	Alexis	
2012	The Snow Queen	Luta, Una, Princess, Mirror, Lake Gao	
2012–present	Monster High films and specials	Abbey Bominable, C.A. Cupid, Rochelle Goyle, Spectra Vondergeist, Wydowna Spider and Astranova	
2013	009 Re:Cyborg	003 / Françoise Arnoul	
2013–2016	Ever After High specials	Raven Queen, CA Cupid, others	Website
2014	Dive Olly Dive and the Pirate Treasure	Professor Kate	
2020	We Bare Bears: The Movie	Canadian Poutine Truck Girl	
2022	Turning Red	Additional Voices	

=== Video games ===
List of voice performances in video games
Year	Title	Role	Notes	Source
2000	Kessen	Sasuke		
2003	Ragnarok Online	Roshiha, Demon Boy, Player boy		Resume
2003	I-Ninja	Aria, Zarola, Operator		Resume
2003	Spawn: Armageddon	Sasha, Angels		
2004	Lineage II	Elf, Human Mystic		Resume
2004	EverQuest II	Various characters	Over 20 characters, according to resume	Resume
2004	Vampire: The Masquerade - Bloodlines	Mira Giovanni		
2005	Destroy All Humans!	Farmer's Wife		
2005	Ed, Edd n Eddy: The Mis-Edventures	Nazz and May Kanker		
2005–2010	Trauma Center	Various characters		Resume
2006	Xenosaga Episode III: Also sprach Zarathustra	Citrine, Abel, Mai Magus		
2006	Dungeons & Dragons Online: Menace of the Underdark	Ana, Crow, Nature Spirit		Resume
2006	Tales of the Abyss	Ion, Sync, Florian, Kathy, Yulia		Resume
2006	Rapala Tournament Fishing	Lure, Boss		Resume
2006–07, 2017	.hack//G.U. series	Sakubo, Alkaid	Rebirth, Reminisce, Redemption, Last Recode	
2007	Spider-Man 3	Arsenic Candy Gang		Resume
2007	Eternal Sonata	Polka		
2008	Dynasty Warriors 6	Cai Wenji, additional voices		Resume
2008	Grand Chase	Elesis Sieghart		Resume
2008	Tom Clancy's Endwar	Russian agent, German Agent		Resume
2009	Dragonball Evolution	Chi-Chi		Resume
2009	Fusion Fall	May Kanker		Resume
2009	Cross Edge	Morrigan Aensland	Uncredited (Note: English voice actor credits were not provided for this title.)	Tweet
2009	Red Faction Guerilla	Guerilla Miner		Resume
2009	Bleach: The 3rd Phantom	Matsuri Kudo		Resume
2009	Katamari Forever	Michiru Hoshino	Uncredited	Resume
2009	Spyborgs	Doctor, Kani, Computer		Resume
2009	League of Legends	Sona, Janna		Resume
2010	White Knight Chronicles	Avatar 6, Ruffian, Soldier		Resume
2010	Final Fantasy XIII	Cocoon Inhabitants		
2010	Ys: The Oath in Felghana	Anya, Hugo, Cynthia		Resume
2010	Majin and the Forsaken Kingdom	Princess		Resume
2011	Ar tonelico Qoga: Knell of Ar Ciel	Sasha	Uncredited	Resume
2011	Dynasty Warriors 7	Cai Wenji	Also Xtreme Legends	Resume
2011	Monkey Quest	Various characters		Resume
2011	Catherine	Erica Anderson, Trisha		
2011	Shin Megami Tensei: Devil Survivor Overclocked	Midori Komaki		Resume
2011–2016	Hyperdimension Neptunia	Noire	Replaced by Erica Mendez starting with Cyberdimension Neptunia: 4 Goddesses Online	Tweet
2012	Final Fantasy XIII-2	Researcher C, Nora B, Student		Resume
2012	Kingdoms of Amalur: Reckoning	Goddess Ethene, Wise Human, Arrogant Alfar, Rogue Villain		Resume
2012	Skullgirls	Parasoul		
2012	Dragon's Dogma	Althea, Nettie		Resume
2012	Unchained Blades	Mari, Echidna		Resume
2012	Mugen Souls	Alys, Moonworld Goth Chick		Resume
2012	Bravely Default	Agnes Oblige		Press
2012	The Lord of the Rings Online: Riders of Rohan	Eowyn, Faronil, Elf Female		Resume
2012	Silent Hill: Book of Memories	Player Jock, Rashly, New girl, Steel Boss, Water Boss		Resume
2012	Zero Escape: Virtue's Last Reward	Quark		Resume
2012	Persona 4 Golden	Chie Satonaka	Also Arena, Ultimax, Dancing All Night	
2013	Fire Emblem Awakening	Emmeryn		
2013	Rune Factory 4	Forte	Also Special	
2013	Shin Megami Tensei: Devil Summoner: Soul Hackers	Naomi, Tomoko, Receptionist Housewife, Bitch Scientist		Resume
2013	Dragon's Dogma: Dark Arisen	Olra, Banshee		Resume
2013	The Last of Us	Voice Over Cast		
2013	Dynasty Warriors 8	Cai Wenji	Also Xtreme Legends	Resume
2013	Shin Megami Tensei IV	Various characters		Resume
2013	Dragon's Crown	Sorceress, Faery, Medusa, Maiden		Resume
2013	Tales of Xillia	Teepo		
2013	Final Fantasy XIV	Nanamo Ul Namo		Resume
2013	Dead or Alive 5 Ultimate	Rachel	Uncredited	Tweet
2013	Disgaea D2: A Brighter Darkness	Plenair, Rainier, Female Mothman, Female Fighter	Uncredited	Resume
2013	Etrian Odyssey Untold: The Millennium Girl	Raquna		Resume
2013	Ingress	Carrie Campbell		Resume
2013	Disney Princess Palace Pets	Beauty (Sleeping Beauty's cat)	app game	Resume
2014	Adventure Time: The Secret of the Nameless Kingdom	Slumber Princess		Resume
2014	Sonic Boom: Rise of Lyric	Perci		Resume
2014	Danganronpa: Trigger Happy Havoc	Junko Enoshima, Genocide Jack	Both roles shared with Amanda C. Miller	Tweet
2014	BlazBlue: Chrono Phantasma	Bullet		Resume
2014	Elsword	Elesis Sieghart, Sirena, Karis, Garpy Harpy, Rose, Durenda, Ignia, Camilla, Daisy		Resume
2014	Elder Scrolls Online	Nord, Reachman, Spriggan		Resume
2014	Conception II	Feene		Resume
2014	Mind Zero	Sana Chikage		Resume
2014	Firefall	Dr. Pauleson, Lt. Hess, Dr. Mitra Bathsheba		Resume
2014	Tales of Xillia 2	Teepo, Rollo		Resume
2014	Danganronpa 2: Goodbye Despair	Junko Enoshima	Role shared with Amanda C. Miller	Resume
2014	World of Warcraft: Warlords of Draenor	Yrel, Koristrasza		
2014	Persona Q	Chie Satonaka		
2014	The Talos Principle	Alexandra Drennan		Tweet
2015	Citizens of Earth	Beekeeper, 1940s Pilot, Hippy chick, Valley Club Girl, Cop, Lifeguard		Resume
2015	Lost Dimension	Nagi Shishiouka		
2015	Danganronpa Another Episode: Ultra Despair Girls	Genocide Jack, Kurokuma		
2015	Stella Glow	Veronica		
2015	Xenoblade Chronicles X	Avatar (Female Soldier)	Grouped under "Avatars"	
2015	Fat Princess Adventures	Zen Master		Website
2016	Read Only Memories	Melody Flores		
2017	Fire Emblem Heroes	Olwen, Sanaki	Sibling Bonds paralogue story	
2017	Nier: Automata	Beauvoir		
2017	Persona 5	Wakaba Isshiki	Also in Royal	Tweet
2017	Puyo Puyo Tetris	Carbuncle, Feli, Ocean Prince		Tweet
2018	Heroes of the Storm	Yrel		
2018	BlazBlue: Cross Tag Battle	Chie Satonaka	Uncredited	Resume
2019	Death Stranding	The Photographer		Resume
2020	The Legend of Heroes: Trails of Cold Steel IV	Ines		
2021	Nier Replicant ver.1.22474487139...	Louise, additional voices		In-game credits
2024	Puyo Puyo Puzzle Pop	Feli, Ocean Prince		
	Eternal Trinity	Evil Goddess		Resume

=== Live-action voice-over ===
List of voice performances in live-action and other dubbing
Year	Title	Role	Notes	Source
2009–11	Brainsurge	Announcer (Seasons 1-2)		Resume
	Farewell, My Queen	La Duchesse Gabrielle de Polignac		Resume
	Rubinrot	Lesley Hay, Madame Rossini		Resume
	Violetta	Jade		Resume
	Creepshow 3	Radio		Resume

=== Live action ===
List of acting performances in television and film
Year	Title	Role	Notes	Source
	Cold Squad	Ex "Masseuse"		Resume
	DaVinci's Inquest	Eyewitness		Resume
	Dead Man's Gun	Madame Belle		Resume
	The Net	Susan		Resume
	The X-Files	Waitress		Resume
	Madison	Heather		Resume

== Awards and nominations ==
Year	Award	Category	Work	Result	Refs
2023	Children's and Family Emmy Awards	Outstanding Voice Performance in a Preschool Animated Program	StoryBots: Answer Time	Nominated	
