= StoryBots =

Children's educational media franchise

- Created by: Evan Spiridellis; Gregg Spiridellis
- Owners: JibJab (2012–present); Netflix (2016–present)
- Years: 2012–present

Films and television
- Animated series: Ask the StoryBots, StoryBots Super Songs, StoryBots: Answer Time, StoryBots: Super Silly Stories with Bo
- Television special: A StoryBots Christmas

Official website
- http://www.storybots.com (Now redirects to the Netflix website)

StoryBots is an American children's media franchise that produces educational TV series, books, videos, music, video games, and classroom activities. Its productions include the Netflix series Ask the StoryBots, StoryBots: Answer Time, StoryBots: Super Silly Stories with Bo, and StoryBots Super Songs.

After launching online and gaining more than 620 million views on YouTube, StoryBots launched its first television series on the streaming service Netflix in 2016. Over three seasons, Ask the StoryBots has won multiple Daytime Emmy Awards and an Annie Award, along with recognition from the Peabody Awards and British Academy Children's Awards. It also spawned a companion show, StoryBots Super Songs, and a holiday special, A StoryBots Christmas.

Created by the entertainment studio JibJab, the brand later became part of StoryBots, Inc., an independent production company. StoryBots, Inc., (along with the StoryBots brand) was acquired by Netflix in May 2019 as part of an overall push by the streaming service into more educational and family-oriented content.

== History ==
StoryBots launched to the public in the summer of 2012 and has been featured on CNN, The New York Times, CNBC, and other news outlets. Gregg Spiridellis, co-founder and CEO of StoryBots, told CNBC in 2013 that he and his brother had five young children between them and noticed "a massive shift in how kids are consuming media". Spiridellis stated that this shift became the inspiration for StoryBots, with digital content akin to Sesame Street created for a device-centric, connected generation of children.

In May 2019, Netflix announced that it had acquired the StoryBots media franchise and signed co-creators Evan and Gregg Spiridellis to an exclusive producing deal. The acquisition was the first of its kind for Netflix and was part of a stated commitment to expand its educational content.

== Television programming ==
The StoryBots franchise's original TV series Ask the StoryBots premiered on Netflix on August 12, 2016. The show follows the StoryBots characters Beep, Bing, Bang, Boop, and Bo (a.k.a. "Answer Team 341B"), and stars Judy Greer. Answer Team 341B goes on adventures into the human world to help answer kids' biggest questions. The first season featured guest appearances from Jay Leno, Whoopi Goldberg, "Weird Al" Yankovic, Kevin Smith, Garfunkel and Oates, Tim Meadows, and Chris Parnell. Ask the StoryBots received critical acclaim for its educational quality and entertainment value for both parents and children. A second season premiered on Netflix on August 24, 2018, and featured guest appearances from Snoop Dogg, Edward Norton, Christina Applegate, Wanda Sykes, David Cross, Ali Wong, Kristen Schaal, and David Koechner.

A third season was released worldwide on Netflix on August 2, 2019, and includes guest appearances from John Legend, Zoe Saldaña, Jennifer Garner, Jason Sudeikis, Alyssa Milano, Tony Hale, Maria Bamford, and Reggie Watts. A trailer for the new episodes was released on YouTube ahead of the season launch. All three season's music soundtracks are available on most music streaming services.

=== Spinoffs ===
A companion series, StoryBots Super Songs, premiered on October 7, 2016, also on Netflix. While each episode of Ask the StoryBots featured the lead characters answering a child's single question, StoryBots Super Songs focused on broader topics, such as outer space, colors, shapes, and dinosaurs, through music and live-action vignettes with real children. Episodes were also released on StoryBots' YouTube channel.

Ask the StoryBots also spun off a holiday special, A StoryBots Christmas, which premiered December 1, 2017, on Netflix. Featuring a guest appearance by Ed Asner as Santa Claus, the special received two Daytime Emmy Awards, including Outstanding Special Class Animated Program, as well as four additional nominations.

A new series called StoryBots: Answer Time premiered on Netflix on November 21, 2022, and includes guest appearances from Danny DeVito, Zooey Deschanel, Common, Sophie Turner, Kevin Smith, Anne Hathaway, Chrissy Teigen, Patton Oswalt, Gabriel Iglesias, and Craig Robinson. A second season of this show premiered on Netflix on July 10, 2023, and includes guest appearances from Rainn Wilson, Josh Gad, Wendi McLendon-Covey, Scarlett Johansson, Gabrielle Union, Joe Lo Truglio, Steve Buscemi, Kristen Bell, Simu Liu, Julie Bowen, Trevor Noah, and Jessica Alba.

Another spin-off series called StoryBots: Super Silly Stories with Bo premiered on Netflix's YouTube channel on June 26, 2022. The series consisted of four seasons, with a total of 26 short form episodes (approximately four to six minutes in length), and four long-form episodes (approximately 22 to 44 minutes in length). Directed, co-written, and edited by Henry Dalton, this series differed from Ask The StoryBots and StoryBots: Answer Time in being comedy-led rather than centering around a child's question to be answered. Super Silly Stories instead focused on a single StoryBot, Bo, and featured much more interaction from the unscripted live-action children. The series was nominated for two Kidscreen Awards, winning "Best Web/App Series - Branded (6-10 Years)." The series has not become available on the streaming platform Netflix.

== Digital library ==
StoryBots created a collection of online learning content and activities that were available at StoryBots' official website before its acquisition by Netflix in 2019. However, the digital library is still available on YouTube. The StoryBots website was nominated for best youth website at the 2018 Webby Awards.

The digital library includes:

- Learning Videos (a collection of animated musical videos that explore a wide range of educational topics)
- Starring You videos (animated music videos that allow users to add their own name and photo)
- Learning Books (educationally-focused ebooks with narration)
- Starring You books (ebooks ranging from classic fairy tales to modern adventures, with face and name personalization)
- Activity sheets and printable books
- Math Skills, Common Core-aligned kindergarten-level math games

== StoryBots Classroom ==
In 2016, StoryBots launched StoryBots Classroom, a free online resource for educators that includes unlimited access to the entire StoryBots library of digital books, videos, activities, the then-newly created Common Core State Standards Initiative-aligned Math Games, and classroom management tools including the Backpack and Class Roster. The product was designed for use on laptops, tablets, and interactive white boards. When it was released, StoryBots Classroom was by profiled by Education Week and was named an "S'Cool Tool of the Week" by EdSurge. It has since received the Teachers' Choice Award and the Tech Edvocate Award for best early childhood education app or tool.

In an interview, CEO Gregg Spiridellis cited significant interest in StoryBots by teachers as the impetus to "invest more in building a product custom-tailored for classroom use, with an emphasis on interactive projection boards, classroom tools, and more educational content."

After Netflix’s acquisition of the brand, StoryBots Classroom was made unavailable.

== YouTube channel ==
StoryBots first uploaded five videos to YouTube in June 2012. StoryBots was also nominated for a 2019 Webby Award in the "Video Series & Channels – Animation" category.

In 2018, StoryBots signed with the DHX Media-owned WildBrain to manage its YouTube channel.

In January 2019, the channel rebranded itself as Netflix Jr. to coincide with the buyout of StoryBots by Netflix.

== Print books ==
In addition to ebooks available on its website, StoryBots also has several print books featuring its characters that are published by Random House Children's Books. Titles include:

- The Amazing Planet Earth (Step Into Reading)
- Cars Are Cool
- The Moon's Time To Shine (Step Into Reading)
- StoryBots ABC Jamboree
- Trucks Are Terrific
- Tyrannosaurus Rex (Step Into Reading)

== Awards ==
Since its founding in 2012, StoryBots has won numerous awards for its digital content, including the Teachers' Choice Award from Learning Magazine, Parent's Choice Award, Family Choice Award, Tech Advocate Award, and an Editor's Choice Award from Children's Technology Review.

For its television work, including Ask the StoryBots, A StoryBots Christmas, StoryBots: Answer Time, StoryBots: Super Silly Stories with Bo, and StoryBots Super Songs, StoryBots has won nine Daytime Emmy Awards, an Annie Award, and a Kidscreen Award. It has received recognition from the British Academy Children's Awards and Peabody Awards.

Year	Award	Category	Recipient(s)	Result
2024	Kidscreen Awards	Best Web/App Series - Branded (6-10 Years)	Storybots: Super Silly Stories with Bo	Won
2024	Kidscreen Awards	Best Mixed-Media Series (6-10 Years)	Storybots: Super Silly Stories with Bo	Nominated
2024	Annie Awards	Best Animated Television/Media Production for Preschool Children	Storybots: Answer Time	Nominated
2023	Children's & Family Emmy Awards	Outstanding Preschool Animated Series	Storybots: Answer Time	Won
2023	Children's & Family Emmy Awards	Outstanding Writing for a Preschool Animated Program	Storybots: Answer Time	Won
2023	Children's & Family Emmy Awards	Outstanding Voice Performance in a Preschool Program	Storybots: Answer Time Erin Fitzgerald	Nominated
2023	Children's & Family Emmy Awards	Outstanding Voice Performance in a Preschool Program	Storybots: Answer Time Fred Tatasciore	Nominated
2023	Children's & Family Emmy Awards	Outstanding Editing for a Preschool Animated Program	Storybots: Answer Time	Nominated
2023	Annie Awards	Outstanding Achievement for Character Animation in a Television/Media Production	Storybots: Answer Time Henrique Baron	Nominated
2023	Annie Awards	Outstanding Achievement for Voice Acting in an Animated Television/Media Production	Storybots: Answer Time Fred Tatasciore	Nominated
2019	Webby Award	Video Series & Channels – Animation	StoryBots on YouTube	Nominated
2019	Webby Award	Websites – Education	StoryBots.com	Nominated
2019	Daytime Emmy Award	Outstanding Preschool Children's Animated Series	Ask the StoryBots	Nominated
2019	Daytime Emmy Award	Outstanding Writing for a Preschool Animated Program	Ask the StoryBots	Won
2019	Daytime Emmy Award	Outstanding Directing for a Preschool Animated Program	Ask the StoryBots	Won
2019	Daytime Emmy Award	Outstanding Interactive Media for a Daytime Program	StoryBots.com	Nominated
2019	Daytime Emmy Award	Outstanding Performer in a Children's, Family Viewing or Special Class Program	Edward Norton in Ask the StoryBots	Nominated
2019	Annie Award	Best Animated Television/Broadcast Production For Preschool Children	Ask the StoryBots	Won
2019	Annie Award	Directing in an Animated Television/Broadcast Production	Ask the StoryBots	Nominated
2018	Webby Award	Websites – Youth	StoryBots.com	Nominated
2018	Common Sense Media	Common Sense Seal	A StoryBots Christmas	Won
2018	Daytime Emmy Award	Outstanding Special Class Animated Program	A StoryBots Christmas	Won
2018	Daytime Emmy Award	Outstanding Interactive Media – Enhancement to a Daytime Program or Series	StoryBots.com	Nominated
2018	Daytime Emmy Award	Outstanding Performer in a Children's/Preschool Children's or Educational or Informational Program	Ed Asner in A StoryBots Christmas	Nominated
2018	Daytime Emmy Award	Outstanding Writing in a Preschool Animated Program	A StoryBots Christmas	Nominated
2018	Daytime Emmy Award	Outstanding Directing in a Preschool Animated Program	A StoryBots Christmas	Won
2018	Daytime Emmy Award	Outstanding Sound Editing for a Preschool Animated Program	A StoryBots Christmas	Nominated
2018	Teachers' Choice Awards	Teachers' Choice Awards for the Family – Supplemental Materials	StoryBots.com	Won
2018	Kidscreen Awards	Best Learning App – Branded	StoryBots App	Nominated
2017	Tech Edvocate Awards	Best Early Childhood Education App or Tool	StoryBots Classroom	Won
2017	British Academy Children's Awards	International	Ask the StoryBots	Nominated
2017	Cynopsis Kids !magination Awards	Educational Series/Special	Ask the StoryBots	Nominated
2017	Webby Award	Mobiles Sites & Apps – Family & Kids	StoryBots App	Nominated
2017	Peabody Award	Children's Programming	Ask the StoryBots	Nominated
2017	Daytime Emmy Award	Outstanding Preschool Children's Animated Program	Ask the StoryBots	Nominated
2017	Daytime Emmy Award	Outstanding Interactive Media – Enhancement to a Daytime Program or Series	StoryBots App and StoryBots Classroom	Won
2017	Daytime Emmy Award	Outstanding Directing in a Preschool Animated Program	Ask the StoryBots	Nominated
2017	Daytime Emmy Award	Outstanding Main Title and Graphic Design	Ask the StoryBots	Nominated
2017	Daytime Emmy Award	Outstanding Sound Mixing for a Preschool Animated Program	Ask the StoryBots	Nominated
2017	Daytime Emmy Award	Outstanding Sound Editing for a Preschool Animated Program	Ask the StoryBots	Nominated
2017	Teachers' Choice Awards	Teachers' Choice Awards for the Classroom – Supplemental Materials	StoryBots Classroom	Won
2017	Annie Awards	Best Animated Television/Broadcast Production For Preschool Children	Ask the StoryBots	Nominated
2016	Common Sense Media	Common Sense Seal	Ask the StoryBots	Won
2016	Cynopsis Kids !magination Awards	Mobile App (Educational)	StoryBots App	Won
2015	Parents' Choice Award	Parents' Choice Award Fun Stuff	StoryBots.com	Won
2014	Kapi Awards	Best App for Younger Children	StoryBots	Won
2014	Parents' Choice Award	Parents' Choice Award Recommended	StoryBots.com	Won
2014	Family Choice Awards	Family Choice Award	StoryBots Starring You Videos	Won
2014	Interactive Media Awards	Family	StoryBots.com	Won
2013	National Parenting Center	Seal of Approval	StoryBots.com	Won
2013	Parents' Choice Award	Parents' Choice Award Recommended	StoryBots Beep & Boop	Won
2013	Parents' Choice Award	Parents' Choice Award Fun Stuff	StoryBots Starring You Books	Won
2013	Parents' Choice Award	Parents' Choice Award Recommended	StoryBots.com	Won
2013	Parents' Choice Award	Parents' Choice Award Silver Honor	StoryBots Tap & Sing	Won
2013	Children's Technology Review	Editors' Choice	StoryBots Beep & Boop	Won
2013	Children's Technology Review	Editors' Choice	StoryBots Tap & Sing	Won
2013	Appy Awards	Books	StoryBots Starring You Books	Won
2013	Interactive Media Awards	Kids	StoryBots.com	Won
2013	Family Choice Awards	Family Choice Award	StoryBots	Won
2012	Family Choice Awards	Family Choice Award	StoryBots	Won
