= Tumble Leaf =

American animated children's television series

- Genre: Children's television series Educational; Fantasy; Stop motion
- Created by: Drew Hodges
- Directed by: Drew Hodges
- Voices of: Christopher Downs; Brooke Wolloff; Zak McDowell; Alex Trugman
- Country of origin: United States
- Original language: English
- No. of seasons: 4
- No. of episodes: 52 (101 segments)

Production
- Executive producers: Kelli Bixler; Drew Hodges
- Producers: Jodi Downs; Genevieve DeMars (season 1); Sarah Serata (seasons 1-2); Matthew Cuny (season 3)
- Running time: 24 minutes
- Production companies: Amazon Studios; Bix Pix Entertainment

Original release
- Network: Amazon Video
- Release: May 23, 2014 – February 25, 2019

Tumble Leaf is an American animated children's television series that premiered in 2014 on Amazon Prime Video. It is stop motion for preschool-aged children and it is based on the short film Miro. Created by animator Drew Hodges (Saturday Night Live, Community) and stop-motion studio Bix Pix Entertainment, Tumble Leaf features an anthropomorphic blue fox named Fig and his caterpillar friend Stick (both voiced by child actor Christopher Downs), along with other residents of the island of Tumble Leaf, helping preschoolers learn basic science lessons through playful examples. Additional regular characters include Maple (Brooke Wolloff), Hedge (Zak McDowell), Pine (Addie Zintel), Ginkgo (Alex Trugman), Rutabaga (Jodi Downs), Zucchini (Alan Franzenburg), and Butternut & Squash (Emily Downs). Each episode consists of two 11-minute stories with Fig learning the mechanics of various items discovered in a special room on board the abandoned shipwreck where he resides.

== Production ==
=== Development ===
The show was part of the first round of television pilots ordered by Amazon in 2013 for its Amazon Video service, and was officially picked up for its first 13-episode season in May.

=== Release ===
The show's first six episodes premiered exclusively on the Amazon Video service on May 23, 2014, and the remaining seven episodes of season one premiered on September 5. A re-dubbed German version premiered for Amazon's German Prime customers on August 20 of the same year.

The second season premiered on December 10, 2015.

The third season premiered on April 4, 2017 with an Easter special. The remainder of season three premiered on August 14.

Season 4 premiered on July 23, 2018. A Halloween special was released on October 19. The remainder of season four premiered on February 25, 2019. The show was nominated for a Peabody Award.

The series ended after the fourth season.

== Episodes ==
=== Season 1 (2014) ===
Episode No.	Segment No.	Title	Written by	Original release date
1a	1	"Shiny Coins"	Kacey Arnold	May 23, 2014
1b	2	"Fig Finds a Shadow"	Kacey Arnold	May 23, 2014
2a	3	"Fig Flies a Kite"	Kacey Arnold	May 23, 2014
2b	4	"Missing a Muffin"	Kacey Arnold	May 23, 2014
3a	5	"Beat of the Drumsticks"	Kacey Arnold	May 23, 2014
3b	6	"Springy Surprise"	Dev Ross	May 23, 2014
4a	7	"On a Roll!"	Kacey Arnold	May 23, 2014
4b	8	"Popcorn Picture Show"	Kacey Arnold	May 23, 2014
5a	9	"Fig Blends In!"	Dev Ross	May 23, 2014
5b	10	"Twirling Top"	Doug Wood	May 23, 2014
6a	11	"The Swimming Hole"	Villamor M. Cruz Jr.	May 23, 2014
6b	12	"Bucket of Mud"	Doug Wood	May 23, 2014
7a	13	"Loopy Straw"	Villamor M. Cruz Jr.	September 5, 2014
7b	14	"Tumble Leaf Parade"	Drew Hodges	September 5, 2014
8a	15	"Icy Igloo"	Doug Wood	September 5, 2014
8b	16	"The Big Dig"	Noelle Wright	September 5, 2014
9a	17	"Woohoo Kazoo!"	Doug Wood	September 5, 2014
9b	18	"Hide and Seek"	Corey Powell	September 5, 2014
10a	19	"Fig's Speedy Sled"	Drew Hodges	September 5, 2014
10b	20	"Parachute Play"	Noelle Wright	September 5, 2014
11a	21	"The Lost Spyglass"	Christopher Keenan	September 5, 2014
11b	22	"Fig's Breakfast Surprise!"	Dev Ross	September 5, 2014
12a	23	"Bedtime Story"	Corey Powell	September 5, 2014
12b	24	"A Treasure Hunt"	Dev Ross	September 5, 2014
13a	25	"Merry-Gear-Round"	Corey Powell	September 5, 2014
13b	26	"Pushy Pulley"	Doug Wood	September 5, 2014

=== Season 2 (2015–16) ===
Episode No.	Segment No.	Title	Written by	Original release date
14a	27	"Magic Mirror"	Karl Geurs and Carin Greenberg	December 10, 2015
14b	28	"A Rainbow in My Room"	Karl Geurs	December 10, 2015
15a	29	"Snowflake Dance"	Jeff Goode	December 10, 2015
15b	30	"The Tinsel Tree Topper"	Steven Darancette	December 10, 2015
16a	31	"Gourd Gets Stuck"	Carin Greenberg	December 10, 2015
16b	32	"The Swing of Things"	Karl Geurs	December 10, 2015
17a	33	"Okra's Sweater"	Carin Greenberg	December 10, 2015
17b	34	"Stick's Meshroom Mansion"	Karl Geurs	December 10, 2015
18a	35	"Stick is Sick"	Karl Geurs	December 10, 2015
18b	36	"Things That Go Round in the Night"	Scot Osterweil	December 10, 2015
19a	37	"Figamajig"	Steven Darancette	December 10, 2015
19b	38	"Camping It Up"	Allan Neuwirth	December 10, 2015
20a	39	"Mighty Mud Movers"	Allan Neuwirth	May 5, 2016
20b	40	"Having a Ball"	Jeff Goode	May 5, 2016
21a	41	"Yak Wash"	Karl Geurs	May 5, 2016
21b	42	"The Caterpillar Wing Ding"	Jeff Goode	May 5, 2016
22a	43	"The Glow Below"	Gabe Pulliam	May 5, 2016
22b	44	"Sub in a Bottle"	Karl Geurs	May 5, 2016
23a	45	"Buckeye's Runaway House"	Jymn Magon	May 5, 2016
23b	46	"Caboose on the Loose"	Allan Neuwirth	May 5, 2016
24a	47	"Clam-tastic Voyage"	Steven Darancette	May 5, 2016
24b	48	"Double Vision"	Jeff Goode	May 5, 2016
25a	49	"Thinking Outside the Hoop"	Jymn Magon	May 5, 2016
25b	50	"Fig's Hay-Maze-ing Wander"	Karl Geurs	May 5, 2016
26a	51	"The Windy Hop"	Carin Greenberg	May 5, 2016
26b	52	"Captain's Cap"	Carin Greenberg	May 5, 2016

=== Season 3 (2017) ===
Episode No.	Segment No.	Title	Written by	Original release date
27a	53	"Stick's Towering, Toppling Cake"	Jeff Goode	August 14, 2017
27b	54	"Bambooboo"	Karl Geurs	August 14, 2017
28a	55	"Rutabagels"	Melanie Wilson Labracio and Adam Wilson	August 14, 2017
28b	56	"Okra-Ball"	Jeff Goode	August 14, 2017
29a	57	"Look Up and Play"	Jeff Kindley	August 14, 2017
29b	58	"To the Moon"	Gabe Pulliam	August 14, 2017
30	59	"Spring-a-ling Surprise"	Jeff Goode	August 14, 2017
31a	60	"Chase the Leaf"	Melanie Wilson Labracio and Adam Wilson	August 14, 2017
31b	61	"Knights of the Tumble Tale"	Melinda LaRose	August 14, 2017
32a	62	"Maple's Mobile Mudpie Stand"	Laurie Israel	August 14, 2017
32b	63	"Paper Plane Messages"	Melanie Wilson Labracio and Adam Wilson	August 14, 2017
33a	64	"Go with the Flow"	Jeff Goode	August 14, 2017
33b	65	"Passing Fancy"	Kris Marvin Hughes	August 14, 2017
34a	66	"Quest for the Chest"	Gabe Pulliam	August 14, 2017
34b	67	"Get a Grip"	Melanie Wilson Labracio and Adam Wilson	August 14, 2017
35a	68	"Nothing in the Finding Place"	Melinda LaRose	August 14, 2017
35b	69	"Finding Play"	Laurie Israel	August 14, 2017
36a	70	"Cock-a-Doodle Day"	Jeff Goode	August 14, 2017
36b	71	"Glow in the Dark Sleepover"	Shane Portman	August 14, 2017
37a	72	"Stick's Quiet Riot"	Melinda LaRose	August 14, 2017
37b	73	"Tappa Tappa Tap Shoes"	Gabe Pulliam	August 14, 2017
38a	74	"The Wheel Thing"	Carin Greenberg	August 14, 2017
38b	75	"Twine Line"	Kris Marvin Hughes	August 14, 2017
39a	76	"The Nature of Friendship"	Drew Hodges	August 14, 2017
39b	77	"The Ship Shop"	Melanie Wilson Labracio and Adam Wilson	August 14, 2017

=== Season 4 (2018–19) ===
Episode No.	Segment No.	Title	Written by	Original release date
40a	78	"Hedge's Butterfly Safari"	Drew Hodges	July 23, 2018
40b	79	"Hopscotch Highway"	Drew Hodges	July 23, 2018
41a	80	"Moonlight Mermaid"	Jeff Goode	July 23, 2018
41b	81	"Hedge's Hatchlings"	Shane Portman	July 23, 2018
42a	82	"Maple's Sand Stand"	Don Gillies	July 23, 2018
42b	83	"Fig's New Clothes"	David Grubstick	July 23, 2018
43a	84	"Train Story"	Drew Hodges	July 23, 2018
43b	85	"Arooga Adventure"	Gabe Pulliam	July 23, 2018
44a	86	"Smell the Roses"	Kris Marvin Hughes	July 23, 2018
44b	87	"Game Changer"	Melanie Wilson Labracio and Adam Wilson	July 23, 2018
45a	88	"Ginkgo's Treasure"	Drew Hodges	July 23, 2018
45b	89	"Power Play"	Don Gillies	July 23, 2018
46	90	"Trick-or-Treat Trek"	Melinda LaRose	October 18, 2018
47a	91	"Tinker Thinker"	Adam Wilson & Melanie Wilson Labracio	February 25, 2019
47b	92	"Tooling Around"	Jeff Goode	February 25, 2019
48a	93	"Fig Shares the Chair"	Gabe Pulliam	February 25, 2019
48b	94	"Ripple Effects"	Shane Portman	February 25, 2019
49a	95	"Ring in the Hatchling"	Don Gillies	February 25, 2019
49b	96	"The Long and Short of It"	David Grubstick	February 25, 2019
50a	97	"Buckeye's Snowball Snow-tel"	Shane Portman	February 25, 2019
50b	98	"Harmonious Hitch"	Adam Wilson & Melanie Wilson Labracio	February 25, 2019
51a	99	"Knit Mitt"	Jeff Goode	February 25, 2019
51b	100	"Maple's Stack-tacular Stone Stack"	Shane Portman	February 25, 2019
52	101	"Rumble Leaf, Tumble Leaf"	Drew Hodges	February 25, 2019

== Awards and nominations ==
Year	Award	Category	Recipients	Result
2014	Annecy International Animated Film Festival	Jury Award for a TV Series	Drew Hodges	Won
2015	42nd Annie Awards	Best Animated TV/Broadcast Production For Preschool Children	Amazon Studios	Won
2015	42nd Annie Awards	Outstanding Achievement for Character Animation in an Animated Television/Broadcast Production	Teresa Drilling, Michael Granberry	Nominated
2015	42nd Annie Awards	Outstanding Achievement for Music in an Animated Television/Broadcast Production	Nathan Barr & Lisbeth Scott (composers)	Nominated
2015	42nd Daytime Creative Arts Emmy Awards	Outstanding Pre-School Children's Animated Program	Kelli Bixler, Drew Hodges, Alice Wilder Ed. D., Jodi Downs, Genevieve Ledoux, and Trisha Gum	Won
2015	42nd Daytime Creative Arts Emmy Awards	Outstanding Individual Achievement in Animation	Michael Granberry (lead animation), Drew Hodges (character design), Jason Kolowski (production design), and Robyn Yannoukos (coloring)	Won
2016	43rd Annie Awards	Best Animated TV/Broadcast Production For Preschool Children	Amazon Studios and Bix Pix Entertainment	Won
2016	43rd Daytime Creative Arts Emmy Awards	Outstanding Pre-School Children's Animated Program	Kelli Bixler, Drew Hodges, Carin Greenberg, Alice Wilder, Ed. D., Jodi Downs, Sarah Serata, and Matthew Cuny	Won
2016	43rd Daytime Creative Arts Emmy Awards	Outstanding Individual Achievement in Animation	Michael Granberry	Won
2016	43rd Daytime Creative Arts Emmy Awards	Outstanding Directing in an Animated Program	Drew Hodges	Won
2016	43rd Daytime Creative Arts Emmy Awards	Outstanding Costume Design/Styling	Robyn Simms Johnson and Carol Binion	Nominated
2017	44th Annie Awards	Best Animated TV/Broadcast Production For Preschool Children	Amazon Studios and Bix Pix Entertainment	Won
2017	44th Annie Awards	Outstanding Achievement, Character Animation in an Animated Television/Broadcast Production	Dan MacKenzie	Nominated
2017	44th Annie Awards	Outstanding Achievement, Character Animation in an Animated Television/Broadcast Production	Joe Heinen	Nominated
2017	44th Daytime Creative Arts Emmy Awards	Outstanding Pre-School Children's Animated Program	Kelli Bixler, Drew Hodges, Carin Greenberg, Alice Wilder, Ed. D., Jodi Downs, Sarah Serata, and Matthew Cuny	Nominated
2017	44th Daytime Creative Arts Emmy Awards	Outstanding Directing in a Preschool Animated Program	Drew Hodges	Won
2017	44th Daytime Creative Arts Emmy Awards	Outstanding Sound Mixing - Preschool Animated Program	John Jackson	Nominated
2017	44th Daytime Creative Arts Emmy Awards	Outstanding Sound Editing - Preschool Animated Program	Sam Plattner and Brooke Lowrey	Nominated
2017	44th Daytime Creative Arts Emmy Awards	Outstanding Individual Achievement in Animation	Yizhou LI (character animator)	Won
2018	45th Annie Awards	Outstanding Achievement for Music in an Animated Television/Broadcast Production	Nathan Barr & Lisbeth Scott (composers)	Nominated
2018	British Academy Children's Awards	International Pre-School	Kelli Bixler, Drew Hodges	Won
2018	45th Daytime Creative Arts Emmy Awards	Outstanding Pre-School Children's Animated Program	Kelli Bixler, Drew Hodges, Carin Greenberg, Alice Wilder Ed. D., Jodi Downs, Sarah Serata, and Matthew Cuny	Won
2018	45th Daytime Creative Arts Emmy Awards	Outstanding Individual Achievement in Animation	Robyn Yannoukos (colorist)	Won
2018	45th Daytime Creative Arts Emmy Awards	Outstanding Directing in a Preschool Animated Program	Drew Hodges, Michael Granberry, Rachel Larsen	Nominated
2019	46th Daytime Emmy Awards	Outstanding Individual Achievement in Animation	Yizhou LI (character animator)	Won
2019	46th Daytime Emmy Awards	Outstanding Cinematography	Jeff Gardner (director of photography)	Won
2019	46th Daytime Emmy Awards	Outstanding Directing for a Preschool Animated Program	Drew Hodges (director) and Michael Granberry (animation director)	Nominated
2019	46th Daytime Emmy Awards	Outstanding Pre-School Children's Animated Series	Kelli Bixler, Drew Hodges, Carin Greenberg, Alice Wilder Ed. D., Jodi Downs, Sarah Serata, and Matthew Cuny	Nominated
2019	46th Daytime Emmy Awards	Outstanding Special Class Animated Program	Kelli Bixler, Drew Hodges, Carin Greenberg, Alice Wilder Ed. D., Jodi Downs, Sarah Serata, and Matthew Cuny for "Trick-or-Treat Trek"	Nominated
2020	47th Daytime Emmy Awards	Outstanding Writing for a Preschool Animated Program	Drew Hodges (writer), Carin Greenberg (writer) and Shane Portman (writer)	Nominated
2020	47th Daytime Emmy Awards	Outstanding Sound Mixing for a Preschool Animated Program	John Jackson (re-recording mixer)	Nominated
2020	47th Daytime Emmy Awards	Outstanding Cinematography	Jeff Gardner (director of photography)	Won
2020	47th Daytime Emmy Awards	Outstanding Directing for a Preschool Animated Program	Drew Hodges (director), Michael Granberry (animation director) and Dan MacKenzie (animation director)	Won
2020	47th Daytime Emmy Awards	Outstanding Individual in Animation	Savelen Forrest (character animator)	Won

== Film ==
On June 10, 2024, it was announced at the Annecy International Animation Film Festival that there will be a feature film of the series titled Tumble Leaf, The Movie with Drew Hodges writing and directing the film.
