= Ask the StoryBots =

American animated preschool children's television series

- Genre: Children's television Animated; Adventure comedy Educational
- Created by: Evan Spiridellis; Gregg Spiridellis
- Based on: StoryBots
- Voices of: Judy Greer; Erin Fitzgerald; Fred Tatasciore; Jeff Gill; Gregg Spiridellis; Evan Spiridellis; Nate Theis
- Theme music composer: Gabe Sokoloff
- Opening theme: "Ask the StoryBots Theme Song"
- Country of origin: United States
- Original language: English
- No. of seasons: 3
- No. of episodes: 22

Production
- Production companies: JibJab Bros. Studios (2016–18); StoryBots Inc. (2019)

Original release
- Network: Netflix
- Release: August 12, 2016 – August 2, 2019

Ask the StoryBots is an American live-action/animated preschool children's television series based on the characters from the StoryBots educational website and videos. It premiered exclusively on Netflix on August 12, 2016. Originally created and produced by JibJab Bros. Studios, the StoryBots media franchise was fully acquired by Netflix in May 2019.

In its first season, the series was nominated for an Annie Award, was a finalist for a Peabody Award, was nominated in the International category at the British Academy Children's Awards, and received six nominations for the Daytime Emmy Awards, including Outstanding Preschool Children's Animated Program. It won the 2017 Daytime Emmy Award for Outstanding Interactive Media - Enhancement to a Daytime Program or Series. Its second season, which premiered on Netflix on August 24, 2018, received the Annie Award for Best Animated Television Production for Preschool Children and won two Daytime Emmy Awards for writing and directing. The third and final season premiered on August 2, 2019.

Ask the StoryBots also inspired the Netflix holiday special A StoryBots Christmas, which won two Daytime Emmy Awards. Starting in its second season, Ask the StoryBots has been translated into 22 languages and is available for streaming on Netflix in 190 countries.

== Plot ==
The StoryBots are little robots who live beneath our screens. In every episode, the quintet of Beep, Bing, Bang, Boop, and Bo, of Team 341-B, go on an adventure to the human world to help answer kids' questions like "Why is the sky blue?" or "Why do I need to brush my teeth?" They deliver their answer in the end of each episode in the form of a music video. Each episode features a special celebrity guest, who helps the Storybots discover the answer to their question.

== Cast ==
=== Main cast ===
- Judy Greer as Beep Boppalot, a green knowledgeable StoryBot.
- Jeff Gill as Bing Badaboom, a yellow, crazy, and hyperactive StoryBot.
- Fred Tatasciore as Bangford "Bang" Bibblebop III, a blue, slow, and cool StoryBot.
- Gregg Spiridellis as Boop Bunklebee, a red grouchy StoryBot.
- Erin Fitzgerald as Bolina "Bo" Bumblefoot, a purple cheerful StoryBot.
- Evan Spiridellis as Harry "Hap" Hacklebee, an olive-green StoryBot who is the boss of the Answers Department.
- Nate Theis as Hub and Bub, orange and gold StoryBots who enjoy goofing off while on the job.

=== Additional voices ===
- Lisa Donovan Lukas
- Randy Crenshaw

== Episodes ==
Ask the StoryBots made its first season debut with six half-hour episodes. Its second season premiered August 24, 2018 and includes eight half-hour episodes. Its third season premiered August 2, 2019 and includes eight half-hour episodes.

=== Series overview ===
Season	Episodes	Originally released
1	6	August 12, 2016
2	8	August 24, 2018
3	8	August 2, 2019

=== Season 1 (2016) ===
No. overall	No. in season	Question	Kid who asked the question	Guest appearance (Note: list not complete)	Songs	Original release date
1	1	"How Does Night Happen?"	Spencer Park	Jay Leno as King Yardstick the Ruler	"You Need an N", "Love Is Red", "Chicken Bop", "How Does Night Happen?"	August 12, 2016
2	2	"How Do Airplanes Fly?"	Katelyn Nagoray	Kevin Smith as Super Mega Awesome Ultra Guy	"Think Green", "In An Airplane", "Rockin' Radishes", "How Do Airplanes Fly?"	August 12, 2016
3	3	"Why Do I Have to Brush My Teeth?"	London Sizemore	Whoopi Goldberg as The Tooth Fairy	"Wake Up", "Alright, It's White", "Big Brown Boogieing Bear", "Why Do I Have To Brush My Teeth?"	August 12, 2016
4	4	"Why Is the Sky Blue?"	Eva Stikeleather	Riki Lindhome and Kate Micucci of Garfunkel and Oates as The Molecules	"The Sky Is Blue", "Cleanup Time", "Calypso Carrots", "Why Is The Sky Blue?"	August 12, 2016
5	5	"Where Do French Fries Come From?"	Kiran Jyothi	"Weird Al" Yankovic as the Spud Spa Yogi	"Great Cities: Paris", "Farmer", "Cars, Cars, Cars", "Where Do French Fries Come From?"	August 12, 2016
6	6	"Where Does Rain Come From?"	Daxter "Dax" Cuthbertson	Tim Meadows and Chris Parnell as The Reindeer	"Hooray For A", "I'm Scared", "Tiger in the Jungle", "Where Does Rain Come From?"	August 12, 2016

=== Season 2 (2018) ===
No. overall	No. in season	Question	Kid who asked the question	Guest appearance	Songs	Original release date
7	1	"How Do Computers Work?"	Edwin "E.J." King Jr.	Snoop Dogg as the Operating System	"The Wheels on the Bus", "The Number 10", "Walk Like A Camel", "How Do Computers Work?"	August 24, 2018
8	2	"Why Can't I Eat Dessert All the Time?"	Lilyn Calloway	Christina Applegate as the Baker	"Food into Energy (Stomach)", "Time To Go", "Horses", "Why Can't I Eat Dessert All the Time?"	August 24, 2018
9	3	"How Many Types of Animals Are There?"	Rayne Harrison	Kristen Schaal as the Biologist	"The Number 5", "So Many Animals", "Riding On A Train", "How Many Types of Animals Are There?"	August 24, 2018
10	4	"How Do Ears Hear?"	Peyton Maria Haddock	Ali Wong as the Brain	"Marconi and the Radio", "Bones In Your Body", "Earth (A Beautiful, Beautiful World)", "How Do Ears Hear?"	August 24, 2018
11	5	"How Do Volcanoes Work?"	Henry Hobgood	David Koechner as the Pirate	"When It's Black", "Layers Of The Earth", "The Number 1", "Volcanoes Finale", "You Gotta Love a Lion", "How Do Volcanoes Work?"	August 24, 2018
12	6	"What Is Electricity?"	Pierce McCloud	Edward Norton as Gary the Electronics Salesman	"Thomas Edison and the Lightbulb", "Mouse Party", "Square Dancin' Squash", "What is Electricity?"	August 24, 2018
13	7	"How Do Flowers Grow?"	Ava Grace Van Meir-Fintchre	David Cross as Moonbeam the Hippie	"Cow", "Itsy Bitsy Spider - Rock Version", "Squares", "How Do Flowers Grow?"	August 24, 2018
14	8	"How Do People Catch a Cold?"	Malachi Anderson	Wanda Sykes as the Doctor	"Wash Your Hands", "The Cold Song", "Apatosaurus", "How Do People Catch A Cold?"	August 24, 2018

=== Season 3 (2019) ===
No. overall	No. in season	Question	Kid who asked the question	Guest appearance	Songs	Original release date
15	1	"How Do You Make Music?"	Mya Young	John Legend as the King of Music	"So Many Instruments", "The Number 3", "Chicken Rap", "How Do You Make Music?"	August 2, 2019
16	2	"Where Do Planets Come From?"	Asher Keller	Zoe Saldaña as the Professor	"We Are the Planets", "The Gravity Song", "Breakin' Brussels Sprouts", "How Are Planets Made?"	August 2, 2019
17	3	"Why Do People Look Different?"	Coco Carter; Lennon Grace	Reggie Watts as Bernard the Nurse	"Rock-a-Bye Baby", "Let's Wait For Yellow", "Sheep", "Why Do People Look Different?"	August 2, 2019
18	4	"Why Do We Have to Recycle?"	Rhori James	Tony Hale as Chuck the Recycling Plant Owner	"Where Does The Garbage Go?", "Triangle", "Triceratops", "Why Do We Have to Recycle? (Reduce, Reuse and Recycle)"	August 2, 2019
19	5	"How Do Cell Phones Work?"	Sorayah Ramdeo	Jennifer Garner as the Cell Tower Operators	"The Hello Song", "Look For Purple", "He's A Rhino", "How Do Cell Phones Work?"	August 2, 2019
20	6	"What Happens When You Flush the Toilet?"	Juaquin Ebuen	Jason Sudeikis as Roger the Plumber	"The Toilet Bowl Song", "Captain Of The Boat", "Dance With The Elephant", "What Happens When You Flush the Toilet?"	August 2, 2019
21	7	"Where Does Chocolate Come From?"	Dae-J Haddon	Alyssa Milano as the Chocolatier	"Money Rap", "Amazing Frog", "Great Cities: Beijing", "Where Does Chocolate Come From?"	August 2, 2019
22	8	"How Do Eyes See?"	Mia Lynn	Maria Bamford as Dr. Pat the Mad Scientist	"Inventions Everywhere", "Rain, Rain, Go Away", "Anklyosaurus", "How Do Eyes See?"	August 2, 2019

== Reception ==
Ask the StoryBots has been called the "best kids' show on Netflix" by both Wired and Decider and has received positive reviews, with critics specifically citing its educational quality and its entertainment value for both children and adults. Common Sense Media wrote, "[It's] both educational and entertaining in every scene yet is visually appealing as well as humorous enough to make both children and parents laugh out loud...While the premise of the show is to answer a child's question, the antics that the characters get themselves into are very funny, and each episode always has an educational twist without being obvious...[T]he magazine format of the show allows for things such as music videos, letter rhyming, songs, and field trips to different places."

The Domestic Geek called the show "a really fun and great way for the family to learn and laugh together", while Chico News & Review wrote that "parents and children alike will want to binge on Netflix's new edutainment series, Ask the StoryBots...The StoryBots dive deep into the natural world, research well-rounded answers and report back through contemporary music, humor and repetition".

== Accolades ==
Year	Award	Category	Recipient(s)	Result
2017	Annie Awards	Best Animated Television/Broadcast Production For Preschool Children	Ask the StoryBots	Nominated
2017	Daytime Emmy Award	Outstanding Preschool Children's Animated Program	Evan Spiridellis, Gregg Spiridellis, Meridith Stokes, Megan McShane, Monica Mitchell	Nominated
2017	Daytime Emmy Award	Outstanding Interactive Media - Enhancement to a Daytime Program or Series	Evan Spiridellis, Gregg Spiridellis, Mauro Gatti, Daniel Haack, Meridith Stokes, Rubens Cantuni, Nina Neulight, Romney Caswell, Jeff Gill, Jacob Streilein, Nikolas Ilic, Rohit Mohan, Bradley Roush	Won
2017	Daytime Emmy Award	Outstanding Directing in a Preschool Animated Program	Evan Spiridellis, Jacob Streilein, Ian Worrel	Nominated
2017	Daytime Emmy Award	Outstanding Main Title and Graphic Design	Ian Worrel, Taylor Clutter, Jeff Gill, Nikolas Ilic, Kendall Nelson, Taylor Price, Evan Spiridellis, Jacob Streilein, Nate Theis, Eddie West	Nominated
2017	Daytime Emmy Award	Outstanding Sound Mixing for a Preschool Animated Program	Leonardo Nasca, Jared Nugent, Jeff Shiffman	Nominated
2017	Daytime Emmy Award	Outstanding Sound Editing for a Preschool Animated Program	Jeff Shiffman, David Carfagno, Brad Meyer, Nicholas J. Ainsworth, Elliot Herman	Nominated
2017	Peabody Award	Children's Programming	Ask the StoryBots	Nominated
2017	Cynopsis Kids !magination Awards	Educational Series/Special	Ask the StoryBots	Nominated
2017	British Academy Children's Awards	International	Ask the StoryBots	Nominated
2019	Annie Awards	Best Animated Television/Broadcast Production For Preschool Children	Ask the StoryBots	Won
2019	Annie Awards	Directing in an Animated Television/Broadcast Production	Evan Spiridellis	Nominated
2019	Daytime Emmy Award	Outstanding Preschool Children's Animated Series	Evan Spiridellis, Gregg Spiridellis, Sarah Kambara, Meridith Stokes	Nominated
2019	Daytime Emmy Award	Outstanding Interactive Media for a Daytime Program	Gregg Spiridellis, Evan Spiridellis, Daniel Haack, Greg Mako, Sarah Kambara, Roberto Tejeda	Nominated
2019	Daytime Emmy Award	Outstanding Performer in a Children's, Family Viewing or Special Class Program	Edward Norton as Gary the Electronics Salesman (for "What Is Electricity?")	Nominated
2019	Daytime Emmy Award	Outstanding Writing for a Preschool Animated Program	Evan Spiridellis, Gregg Spiridellis, Nate Theis, Jacob Streilein, Eddie West, Jeff Gill	Won
2019	Daytime Emmy Award	Outstanding Directing for a Preschool Animated Program	Jacob Streilein, Jeff Gill, Evan Spiridellis	Won
2020	Annie Awards	Best Animated Television/Broadcast Production for Preschool Children	Ask the Storybots	Won
2020	Annie Awards	Outstanding Achievement for Character Animation in an Animated / Television Broadcast Production	Chris O'Hara	Nominated
2020	Daytime Emmy Award	Outstanding Preschool Children's Animated Series	Evan Spiridellis, Gregg Spiridellis, Sarah Kambara	Won
2020	Daytime Emmy Award	Outstanding Writing for a Preschool Animated Program	Evan Spiridellis, Gregg Spiridellis, Nate Theis, Jacob Streilein, Eddie West, Jeff Gill	Nominated
2020	Daytime Emmy Award	Outstanding Directing for a Preschool Animated Program	Jacob Streilein, Jeff Gill, Evan Spiridellis	Nominated
2020	Daytime Emmy Award	Outstanding Sound Editing for a Preschool Animated Program	Jeff Shiffman, Nicholas J. Ainsworth, Tess Fournier, Jacob Cook, Ian Howard, Johnathan Lopez	Nominated
2020	Daytime Emmy Award	Individual Achievement in Animation	Chris O'Hara	Won

== Music ==
The show's first season soundtrack, Ask the StoryBots: Season 1 (Music from the Original Series), was released to digital vendors in September 2016 and is currently available for download and streaming on Spotify, Apple Music, iTunes and Amazon.com. The series' second season soundtrack was released on August 31, 2018.

== Spinoffs ==
A companion series, StoryBots Super Songs, premiered on October 7, 2016, also on Netflix. A holiday special, A StoryBots Christmas, premiered on December 1, 2017, and features Ed Asner in a guest appearance as Santa Claus. It received two Daytime Emmy Awards, including Outstanding Special Class Animated Program, with an additional four nominations.
