= Evan Spiridellis =

American animator

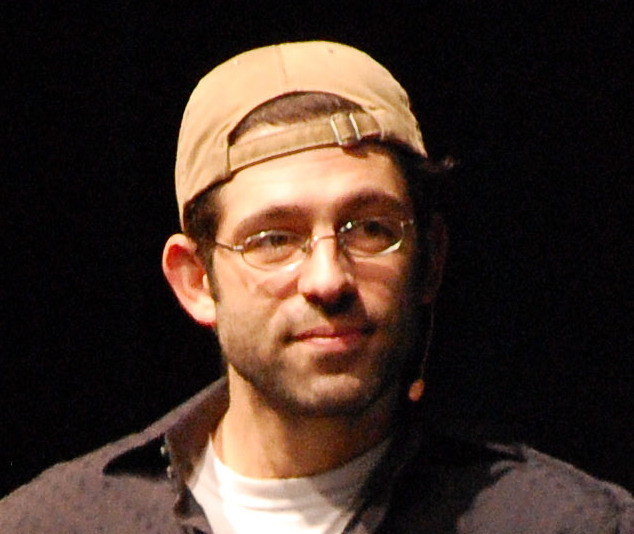
- Spiridellis at Entertainment Gathering 2010
- Born: Marlboro Township, New Jersey, U.S.
- Occupation: Media and technology entrepreneur
- Known for: Co-founding JibJab; and StoryBots
- Notable work: Ask the StoryBots; A StoryBots Christmas; StoryBots: Answer Time
- Spouse: Adrienne Spiridellis
- Relatives: Gregg Spiridellis

Evan Spiridellis is an American animator, artist, media and technology entrepreneur, director, and producer. He co-founded the digital entertainment studios JibJab and StoryBots with his brother Gregg Spiridellis.JibJab gained public attention in 2004 for its viral animated political parody, This Land. The brothers sold JibJab to Catapult Capital in 2018 and StoryBots Netflix in 2019.

== Early life and education ==
Spiridellis was born in Marlboro Township, New Jersey with his brother and attended Marlboro High School.

He graduated from Parsons School of Design in 1996 with a Bachelor of Arts in Illustration. While at Parsons, he studied under master illustrators David J. Pasalacqua and Bob Levering.

== Career ==
=== JibJab ===
In 1999, Gregg and Evan Spiridellis founded JibJab in Brooklyn. The company gained prominence in 2004 with an animated parody of the U.S. presidential election featuring George W. Bush and John Kerry set to Woody Guthrie's This Land Is Your Land. The video prompted a copyright dispute with Ludlow Music that was settled with the Electronic Frontier Foundation representing JibJab. The company also produced ElfYourself for OfficeMax.

The Spiridellis brothers world premiered 16 shorts on the Tonight Show with Jay Leno and appeared as guests on the show multiple times. They also premiered two videos at the TV & Radio correspondents dinner for both presidents George W. Bush and Barack Obama.

=== StoryBots ===
In 2012, the Spiridellis brothers launched StoryBots, an educational media brand for children. The brand launched on YouTube and expanded to Netflix with the series Ask the StoryBots, which launched in August 2016. In 2018 Wired Magazine called the show “one of the funniest, smartest, most delightful children’s shows of recent memory. Netflix acquired the StoryBots company in May 2019. Spiridellis voiced Hap, the stressed out boss, as well as a host of secondary characters.

=== Spiridellis Bros. Studios ===
In October 2025, they founded Spiridellis Bros. Studios, an independent animation studio. The venture attracted investment from firms including Polaris Partners, Google, Ashton Kutcher, Guy Oseary, Chris Sacca, Tim Ferriss and Katie Stanton. The studio announced an exclusive partnership with children's music artist Parry Gripp in November 2025.

=== Other ventures ===
Spiridellis authored children's books: Are You Grumpy, Santa? and The Longest Christmas List Ever!, both published by Disney-Hyperion.

== Awards and recognition ==
In 2004, ABC News named Gregg and Evan Spiridellis People of the Year.

Ask the StoryBots was a finalist for the 76th Peabody Awards and won the Annie Award for Best Animated Television Production for Children at the 47th Annie Awards.

StoryBots productions have received multiple Daytime Emmy (2017–2020) and Children's & Family Emmy Awards (2023–2025), across various categories, including preschool series, writing, and directing.

StoryBots: Super Silly Stories with Bo won the 2024 Kidscreen Award for Best Web/App Series, Branded.

== Personal life ==
Spiridellis lives in Los Angeles, California with his wife Adrienne Spiridellis.
