= Daytime Emmy Award for Outstanding Pre-School Children's Animated Program =

Former television award

- Awarded for: Outstanding Morning Program
- Country: United States
- Presented by: Academy of Television Arts & Sciences
- First award: 2013
- Final award: 2021

Highlights
- Most awards: Tumble Leaf (3)
- Most nominations: Peg + Cat (5); Tumble Leaf (5)
- Website: emmyonline.org

The Daytime Emmy Award for Outstanding Pre-School Children's Animated Program had been awarded annually between 2013 and 2021. These shows were previously honored in the Daytime Emmy Award for Outstanding Children's Animated Program category. In November 2021, it was announced that all Daytime Emmy categories honoring children's programming would be retired in favor of a separate Children's & Family Emmy Awards ceremony that was held starting in 2022. This category was replaced by the Children's and Family Emmy Award for Outstanding Preschool Animated Series.

== 2010s ==
Year	Program	Network	Ref
2013 (40th)
2013 (40th)	Bubble Guppies	Nickelodeon	
2013 (40th)	Dinosaur Train	PBS	
2013 (40th)	Jake and the Never Land Pirates	Disney Channel	
2013 (40th)	Justin Time	Sprout	
2014 (41st)
2014 (41st)	Peg + Cat	PBS	
2014 (41st)	Curious George	PBS	
2014 (41st)	Sofia the First	Disney Channel	
2014 (41st)	The Wonder Pets	Nickelodeon	
2015 (42nd)
2015 (42nd)	Tumble Leaf: Season 1	Amazon	
2015 (42nd)	Peg + Cat	PBS	
2015 (42nd)	VeggieTales in the House	Netflix	
2016 (43rd)
2016 (43rd)	Tumble Leaf	Amazon	
2016 (43rd)	Dinosaur Train	PBS	
2016 (43rd)	Henry Hugglemonster	Disney Junior	
2016 (43rd)	Peg + Cat	PBS	
2016 (43rd)	Wallykazam!	Nickelodeon	
2017 (44th)
2017 (44th)	The Snowy Day	Amazon	
2017 (44th)	Tumble Leaf	Amazon	
2017 (44th)	Ask the StoryBots	Netflix	
2017 (44th)	Peg + Cat	PBS	
2017 (44th)	Wallykazam!	Nickelodeon	
2018 (45th)
2018 (45th)	Tumble Leaf	Amazon	
2018 (45th)	If You Give A Mouse A Cookie	Amazon	
2018 (45th)	Nature Cat	PBS	
2018 (45th)	Peg + Cat	PBS	
2018 (45th)	The Stinky & Dirty Show	Amazon	
2019 (46th)
2019 (46th)	Daniel Tiger's Neighborhood	PBS	
2019 (46th)	Ask the StoryBots	Netflix	
2019 (46th)	Elena of Avalor	Disney Channel	
2019 (46th)	Esme & Roy	HBO	
2019 (46th)	Muppet Babies	Disney Junior	
2019 (46th)	Tumble Leaf	Amazon	

== 2020s ==
Year	Program	Network	Ref
2020 (47th)
2020 (47th)	Ask the StoryBots: Season 3	Netflix	
2020 (47th)	Bubble Guppies	Nickelodeon	
2020 (47th)	Doc McStuffins	Disney Junior	
2020 (47th)	Floogals	Universal Kids	
2020 (47th)	Norman Picklestripes	Universal Kids	
2020 (47th)	Vampirina	Disney Junior	
2021 (48th)
2021 (48th)	The Adventures of Paddington	Nickelodeon	
2021 (48th)	Elinor Wonders Why	PBS	
2021 (48th)	Esme & Roy	HBO Max	
2021 (48th)	Stillwater	Apple TV+	
2021 (48th)	Trash Truck	Netflix	

== Programs with multiple awards ==
3 awards

- Tumble Leaf

== Total awards ==
- Amazon - 4
- PBS - 2
- Nickelodeon - 2
- Netflix - 1

== Multiple Nominations (3 or more) ==
5 nominations

- Peg + Cat
- Tumble Leaf

3 nominations

- Ask the StoryBots

2 nominations

- Bubble Guppies
- Dinosaur Train
- Wallykazam!

== See also ==
- List of animation awards
- Daytime Emmy Award for Outstanding Children's Animated Program
