= Gregg Spiridellis =

American media and technology entrepreneur

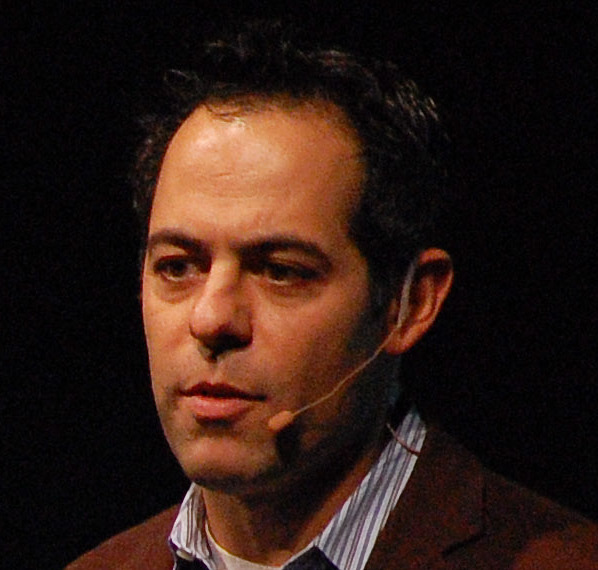
- Spiridellis at Entertainment Gathering 2010
- Born: February 23, 1971 (age 55); Marlboro, New Jersey, U.S.
- Occupation: Media and technology entrepreneur
- Known for: Co-founding JibJab; and StoryBots
- Notable work: Ask the StoryBots; A StoryBots Christmas; StoryBots: Answer Time
- Spouse: Katie Stanton
- Relatives: Evan Spiridellis (brother)

Gregg Nikolas Spiridellis (born February 23, 1971) is an American media and technology entrepreneur, writer, and producer. He co-founded the digital entertainment studios JibJab and StoryBots with his brother, Evan Spiridellis. Their company JibJab gained prominence in 2004 for the viral political parody This Land. They sold JibJab to Catapult Capital in 2018, and StoryBots to Netflix in 2019.

== Early life and education ==
Spiridellis was born in Marlboro, New Jersey and attended Marlboro High School.

He graduated from Rutgers University in 1993 with a Bachelor of Science in finance. While at Rutgers, he ran the campus concert organization and booked acts including the Beastie Boys and Chris Rock.

After working as an investment banker at Goldman Sachs and Bear Stearns, Spiridellis earned an MBA from the University of Pennsylvania's Wharton School in 1999.

== Career ==
=== JibJab ===
In 1999, Gregg and Evan Spiridellis founded JibJab in Brooklyn. The company gained widespread attention in 2004 with This Land, an animated parody of the U.S. presidential election featuring George W. Bush and John Kerry set to Woody Guthrie's This Land Is Your Land. The video prompted a copyright dispute with Ludlow Music that was settled with the Electronic Frontier Foundation representing JibJab. The company introduced a greeting card line with personalization features in 2007 that reached 1 million subscribers. The company also produced ElfYourself for OfficeMax. In February 2019, JibJab was acquired by the private equity firm Catapult Capital.

=== StoryBots ===
In 2012, the Spiridellis brothers launched StoryBots, an educational media brand for children. The brand launched on YouTube and expanded to Netflix with the series Ask the StoryBots, which launched in August 2016. Netflix acquired the StoryBots company in May 2019. Spiridellis voiced the character Boop.

=== Spiridellis Bros. Studios ===
In October 2025, the brothers launched Spiridellis Bros. Studios, an independent animation studio leveraging generative media tools. Investors included Polaris Partners, Google, Ashton Kutcher, Guy Oseary, Chris Sacca, Tim Ferriss and Katie Stanton. The studio announced an exclusive partnership with children's music artist Parry Gripp in November 2025.

=== Other ventures ===
Spiridellis authored two children's books: Are You Grumpy, Santa? and The Longest Christmas List Ever!, both published by Disney-Hyperion.

In 2020, he founded HiHo, an asynchronous video conversation platform.

In 2023, Spiridellis founded Moments Journal, an AI-driven clinical documentation platform for therapists.

== Awards and recognition ==
In 2004, ABC News named Gregg and Evan Spiridellis People of the Year.

Ask the StoryBots was a finalist for the 76th Peabody Awards and won the Annie Award for Best Animated Television Production for Children at the 47th Annie Awards. StoryBots: Super Silly Stories with Bo won the 2024 Kidscreen Award for Best Web/App Series, Branded.

StoryBots productions have received multiple Daytime Emmy and Children's & Family Emmy Awards, including:

- Emmy Awards (2017–2020): Multiple wins for Ask the StoryBots and A StoryBots Christmas, including Preschool Animated Series, Writing, Directing, and Animation
- Children’s & Family Emmy Awards (2023–2025): Wins for StoryBots: Answer Time, including Preschool Animated Series, Writing, Directing, and Voice Performance

== Personal life ==
Spiridellis lives in Boulder, Colorado with his wife Katie Stanton. He is of Greek descent.

== See also ==
- JibJab
- StoryBots
