= JibJab =

American digital entertainment studio

JibJab Catapult CA, Inc.
- Logo used since January 2020
- Company type: Private
- Website type: Humor
- Available in: English; Spanish
- Headquarters: Los Angeles, California, U.S.
- Owner: Catapult Capital (2019–present)
- Founders: Evan Spiridellis, Gregg Spiridellis
- CEO: Paul Hanges
- Employees: At least 28
- Website: www.jibjab.com
- Registration: Optional
- Launched: September 30, 1999; 27 years ago
- Current status: Active

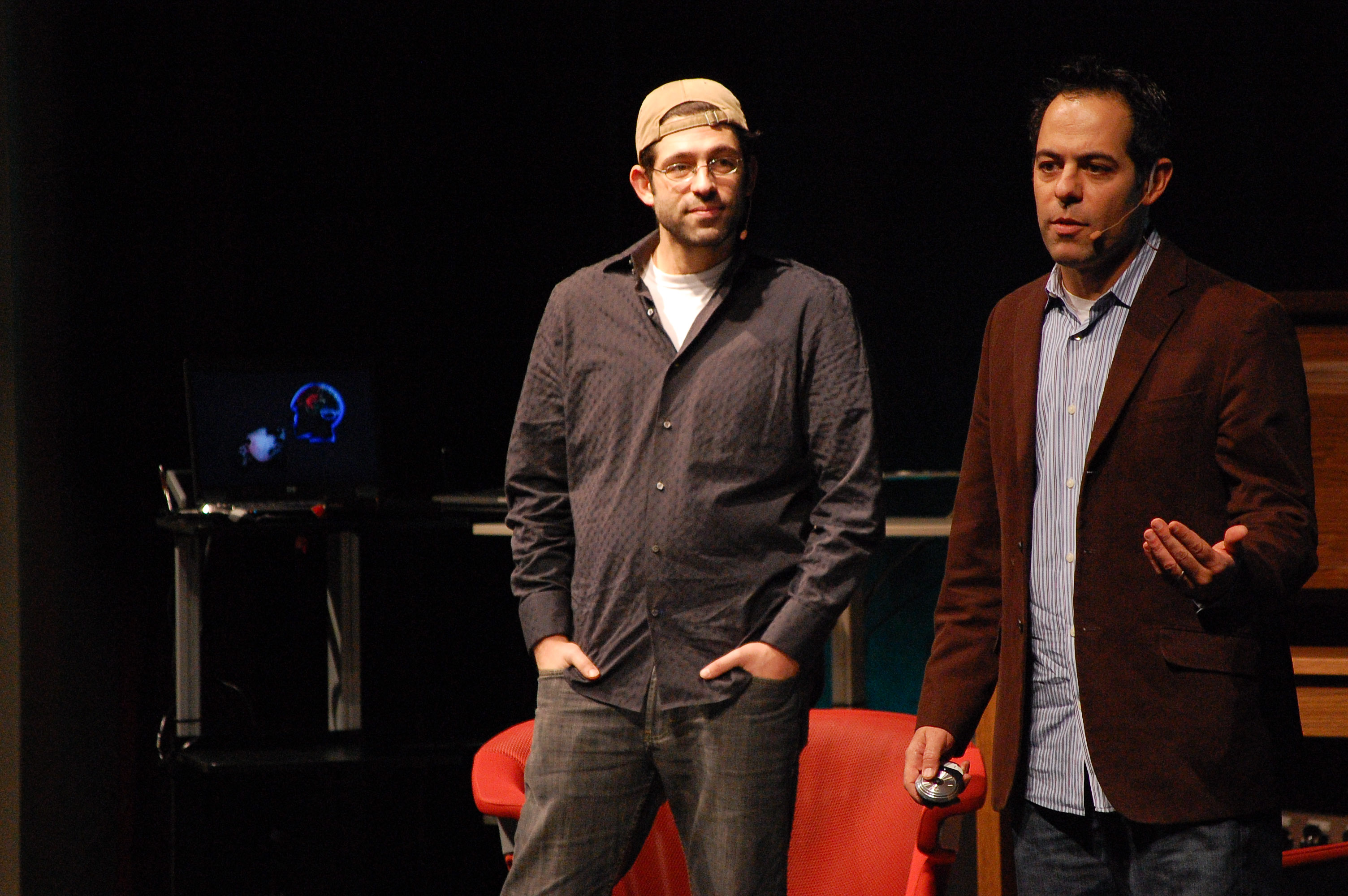
Evan and Gregg Spiridellis at Entertainment Gathering 2010

JibJab Catapult CA, Inc. is an American independent digital entertainment studio based in Los Angeles, California. Founded in 1999 by brothers Evan and Gregg Spiridellis, it first achieved widespread attention during the 2004 US presidential election. In 2019, JibJab was acquired by the private equity firm Catapult Capital.

Initially known for political and social satire, JibJab produced commercials and shorts for clients such as Sony, Noggin, Cartoon Network, Nickelodeon, PBS Kids, Sprout, NBC, Qubo, and Disney before focusing on its now-flagship personalized e-card and messaging services. JibJab also expanded into the children's educational market with StoryBots, which has since spawned two Netflix television series.

== History ==
JibJab was founded in 1999 by brothers Evan and Gregg Spiridellis. It first achieved widespread attention during the 2004 US presidential election when their animated parody video of George W. Bush and John Kerry singing "This Land Is Your Land" became a viral hit.

In 2004, it released its animated sticker-making program, which became the 2016 top App Store app by download growth.

In 2012, JibJab also expanded into the children's educational market with its multi-platform learning program, StoryBots, which has since spawned two Netflix television series: Ask the StoryBots and StoryBots Super Songs.

In 2019, JibJab was acquired by the private equity firm Catapult Capital.

== Videos ==
Initially known for political and social satire, JibJab produced commercials and shorts for clients such as Sony, Noggin, Cartoon Network, Nickelodeon, PBS Kids, Sprout, NBC, Qubo, and Disney.

=== Political satire ===
==== "Cooking With Clinton" ====
One of JibJab's first animations "Cooking With Clinton" is about then-president Bill Clinton trying to show the viewers how to bake weed brownies while high. He repeatedly asks Hillary for a glass of water.

==== "Capitol Ill" ====
For the 2000 United States presidential election, JibJab and AtomFilms released an interactive Flash movie titled "Capitol Ill" on July 15, 2000. This featured an animated rap battle between George W. Bush and Al Gore over the beat of "Fantastic Voyage" by Coolio. Bill Clinton and George H. W. Bush also make appearances. This cartoon aired on Mad TV on November 4, 2000.

==== "Rumple!" ====
In 2001, JibJab released a series of Flash movies featuring then-President George W. Bush and his 3-inch tall "imaginary" friend named Rumple facing challenges and solving them while singing catchy tunes.

- Russian Bully: Rumple tries to solve Bush's problem with Russian President Vladimir Putin after he mocks Bush on a phone call and gets notified that he will have to meet him at a Russian summit meeting.
- Funny Foreign Names: Rumple tries to solve Bush's problem of mispronouncing the names of world leaders, after a press conference with then-Nigerian President Olusegun Obasanjo.
- Domestic Crisis: Rumple tries to solve Bush's problem after his ethnic cleansing of Alabama, which caused mass riots across the state.

==== "Ahnuld for Governor" ====
In 2003, JibJab produced a Flash movie poking fun at Arnold Schwarzenegger's campaign for Governor of California. It depicts Schwarzenegger giving a campaign speech to "terminate Gray Davis" as well as going over how he will handle the state if elected.

JibJab logo (1999–2014)

==== "This Land" ====
For the 2004 United States presidential election, JibJab created a Flash movie entitled "This Land," released on July 9, 2004, which featured animated versions of George W. Bush and John Kerry – voiced by comedian Jim Meskimen – singing a parody of Woody Guthrie's song "This Land Is Your Land."

The video was an instant success, being viewed all over the world and on the International Space Station. The traffic surge forced JibJab's server to be shut down after one day, and the clip was placed on AtomFilms, where it got more than a million hits in 24 hours.

After being linked from thousands of websites, the video was featured several times in the print media and on television, including NBC Nightly News, Fox News, and ABC World News Tonight. On July 26, 2004, the creators appeared on The Tonight Show with Jay Leno. In December 2004, the Spiridellis brothers were named People of the Year by Peter Jennings.

The Richmond Organization, a music publisher that owns the copyright to Guthrie's tune through its Ludlow Music Unit, threatened legal action. JibJab responded with a lawsuit in a California federal court, claiming their use of the song was protected under a fair use exemption for parodies. JibJab and Ludlow Music reached a settlement after JibJab's attorneys unearthed evidence that the song had passed into the public domain in 1973. The terms of the settlement allowed for the continued distribution of "This Land."

==== "Good to Be in DC" ====
In October 2004, JibJab followed up with another original animation, "Good to Be in DC," set to the tune of Dan Emmett's "Dixie." In this video, animated versions of George W. Bush, Dick Cheney, John Kerry, and John Edwards sing about their hopes for the upcoming election.

==== "Second Term" ====
On January 18, 2005, two days before Bush was inaugurated for another term, JibJab released a third video, "Second Term." Set to the tune of "She'll Be Coming 'Round the Mountain", an animated Bush gloats over his successful bid for a second term as president, and his plans for it, based on his campaign promises.

==== "Time for Some Campaignin'" ====
For the 2008 United States presidential election, JibJab released another election-themed animation, "Time for Some Campaignin'," in July of that year. Set to the tune of Bob Dylan's "The Times They Are a-Changin'," animated versions of Bill and Hillary Clinton, John McCain, and Barack Obama sing of their presidential hopes with George W. Bush and Dick Cheney bid farewell to the White House. This video was the first instance where viewers had the option of using JibJab's e-card website to insert their own face as that of a harassed voter.

==== "He's Barack Obama" ====
Upon Barack Obama becoming president, JibJab released "He's Barack Obama," which portrayed Obama as a superhero. The music becomes a heavy metal interpretation of "When Johnny Comes Marching Home," as Obama promises he will fix the Middle East, defeat the Taliban, fix the schools, fight a giant space robot, wrestle a bear, fix the deficit, and more. This one is notable for having been viewed by Obama himself. Its YouTube video description calls it "a new, over-the-top satire that debuted in front of the President himself this Friday at the Radio & Television Correspondents Dinner!"

==== 2012 election ====
For the 2012 United States presidential election, JibJab did not make an election video and instead began to focus on their e-card business. However, an election web app was released in late October 2012 and the results of the election were mentioned in their 2012 “Year in Review” video.

=== Year in Review ===
From 2005 to 2014, JibJab annually released "Year in Review" videos, usually the last week of December, sung to various classical melodies. The videos were originally uploaded on YouTube and their website. But on December 11, 2015, JibJab announced on Facebook that they would not be releasing any more "Year in Review" videos, as the brothers had begun finding them creatively unfulfilling. By then, ten "Year in Review" videos had been made; by the winter of 2016, JibJab removed all "Year in Review" videos from their website (although they would remain on their YouTube channel) and started to focus on their e-card videos instead. However, on November 24, 2020, in response to popular demand, JibJab uploaded a special "Year In Review" series with a video about 2020, the first, and only, to use an original tune.

=== Others ===
==== "Santa Claus!" ====
Released in December 2004 as the last animation of their "Nasty Santa" series, tells the story of a grumpy looking-Santa Claus singing about how stressful his job is on Christmas and how he doesn't get paid at the same time.

==== "Big Box Mart" ====
In mid-2005, JibJab made a project called The Great Experiment which encouraged users to send their faces to JibJab to be featured in their next video. That video would become "Big Box Mart," which made its premiere on The Tonight Show with Jay Leno on October 13, 2005. Sung to the tune of "Oh, Susannah," it tells the story of a 53-year-old frequent patron of the titular big-box store, who is enthralled by the store's discounts and offers. But he soon loses his job as a factory worker, which is outsourced to Beijing as a result of the company now selling cheap products to Big Box Mart stores. The man is left no choice but to be employed at his local Big Box Mart for the rest of his life.

==== "What We Call the News" ====
In January 2007, Brian Wilson asked Evan and Gregg Spiridellis if they wanted to produce an animation that poked fun at the media; they said yes after a "nanosecond." "What We Call the News" premiered at the 2007 Radio and Television Correspondents' Association Dinner, and was later shown on The Tonight Show. It was posted on the JibJab website the next day, March 29, 2007. Sung to the tune of the "Battle Hymn of the Republic," "What We Call the News" laments the decline of journalism and the obsessive promotion of sensationalistic stories in the cable TV era.

==== "Founding Fathers Rap" ====
On December 15, 2000, JibJab released an interactive Flash movie featuring George Washington, Benjamin Franklin, and Thomas Jefferson rapping about their accomplishments; they end their verse with "we declare our independence." They are accompanied by John Adams and James Madison: Adams is the DJ, and Madison says "Oh Yeah" after every verse.

==== "Matzah! Rap" ====
On April 21, 2005, Eric Schwartz collaborated with JibJab to make the original song and music video Matzah! Rap which was featured on The Tonight Show with Jay Leno. The music video showcases a Jewish teen rapping about eating the matzah and celebrating Passover.

==== "Shawshank in a Minute" ====
This sketch was the winner of a 2006 online competition, The Great Sketch Experiment, held by JibJab and their first live-action production. Participants included the comedy duo Famous Last Nerds (Jordan Allen-Dutton and Erik Weiner) and John Landis as director. It both summarizes and parodies The Shawshank Redemption, condensing the plot to a length of less than three minutes and underlining it with rap music.

==== Music videos ====
JibJab produced a music video for the 2006 song "Do I Creep You Out?" by "Weird Al" Yankovic, a parody of Taylor Hicks' "Do I Make You Proud?" The video depicts the main character stalking a barista in increasingly disturbing ways, and ends with him being arrested and jailed as he publicly professes his emotions in a song. In 2009 JibJab produced another music video for Yankovic for the song "CNR," which parodies The White Stripes. The video and song portray Charles Nelson Reilly as a superhuman doing seemingly impossible or improbable things. It also features Yankovic and Jon "Bermuda" Schwartz as Jack White and Meg White, respectively.

== E-cards and messaging ==
Starting in October 2007, JibJab began its focus on personalized e-cards and videos, letting users insert photographs of their faces into humorous birthday cards, holiday greetings, and congratulatory notes and send them to other people as e-cards or "sendables." Initially, this included branded personalized videos, including working with OfficeMax on the video site Elf Yourself, where an uploaded photo is put onto a singing and dancing elf, as well as partnerships with Star Wars (for the 30th anniversary of The Empire Strikes Back) and Mad Men. A series of eCards were created by Internet personality Dane Boedigheimer (best known for later creating Annoying Orange) known as "From the Fridge", featuring anthropomorphized foods such as eggs, chocolates, avocados, pumpkins, cranberries, and cookies suffering a horrifying torture or death in accordance with their use or consumption for events and holidays such as birthdays, anniversaries, congratulation, Valentine's Day, the Super Bowl, Easter, Halloween, Thanksgiving, and Christmas.

Since then, in addition to greeting e-cards, JibJab has extended its personalization technology to popular music videos, including:

- ...Baby One More Time (Britney Spears)
- Friday (Rebecca Black)
- Gangnam Style (Psy)
- Sexy and I Know It (LMFAO)
- Shut Up and Dance (Walk the Moon)
- Addicted to Love (Robert Palmer)
- Roar (Katy Perry)
- Take On Me (A-ha)
- All About That Bass (Meghan Trainor)
- Cake by the Ocean (DNCE)
- Happy (Pharrell Williams)
- Sorry (Justin Bieber)
- Cheap Thrills (Sia)

Since JibJab launched its e-card service, more than 100 million people have visited JibJab's website annually. In 2014, the company launched a messaging app for personalized animated GIFs, available on both iOS and Android platforms. In 2016, the JibJab app was one of the first mobile apps to be enabled for iMessage and was ranked first among them in download growth. The JibJab app was also featured prominently in Apple's annual WWDC product presentation.

== StoryBots ==
In 2012, JibJab expanded into the children's educational market with its multi-platform learning program, StoryBots. The brand currently includes web-based educational content, as well as multiple Netflix television series. StoryBots was acquired by Netflix in 2019.

== See also ==
- Annoying Orange
- Elf Yourself
- Flipnote Studio
- Independent animation
- StoryBots
- Vyond
- YouTube
