= Katie Jacobs Stanton =

American businesswoman (born 1970)

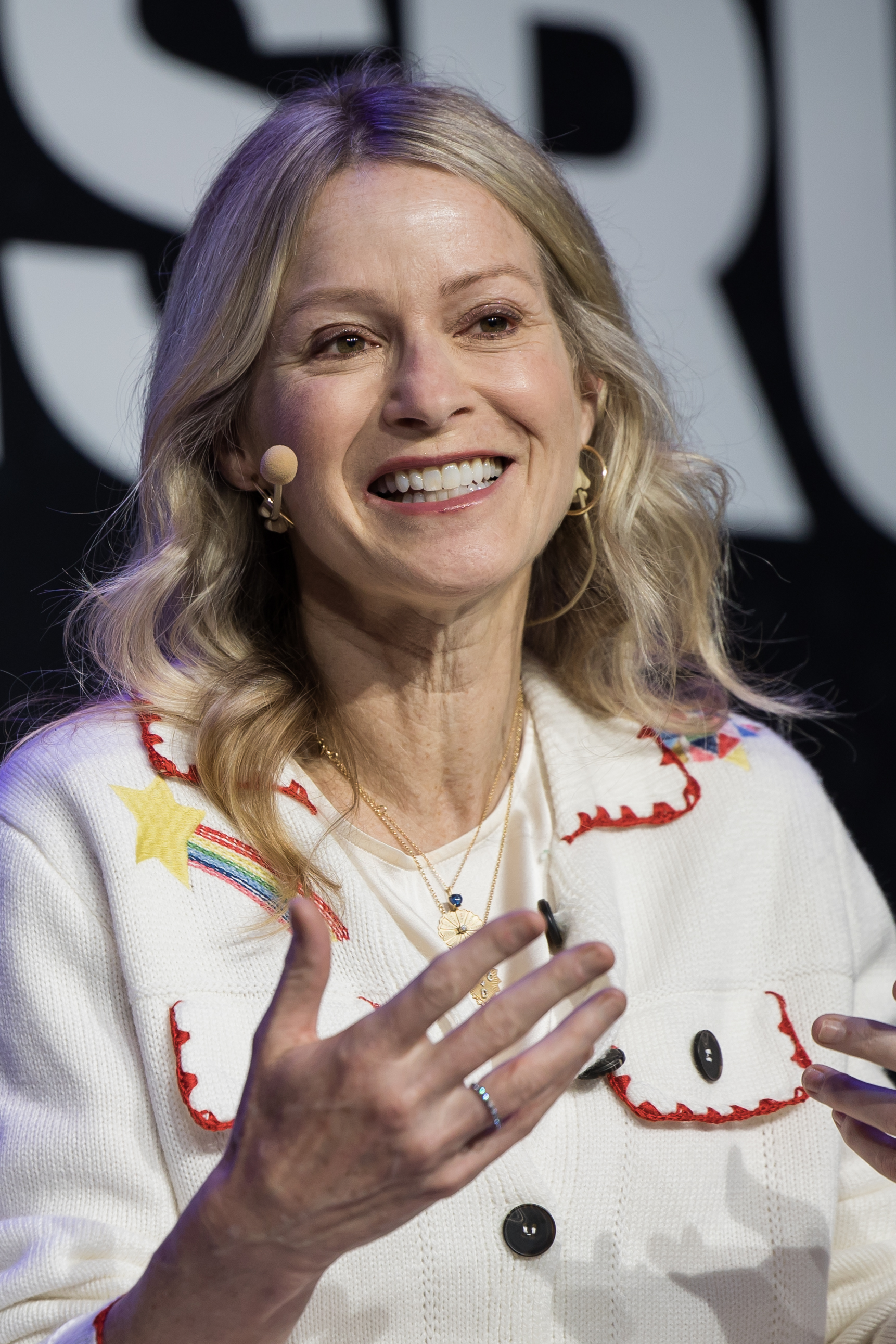
- Stanton in 2025
- Born: October 17, 1970 (age 55)
- Education: Rhodes College (B.A., 1991); School of International and Public Affairs, Columbia University (MIA, 1995)
- Occupation: Venture capitalist
- Children: 3

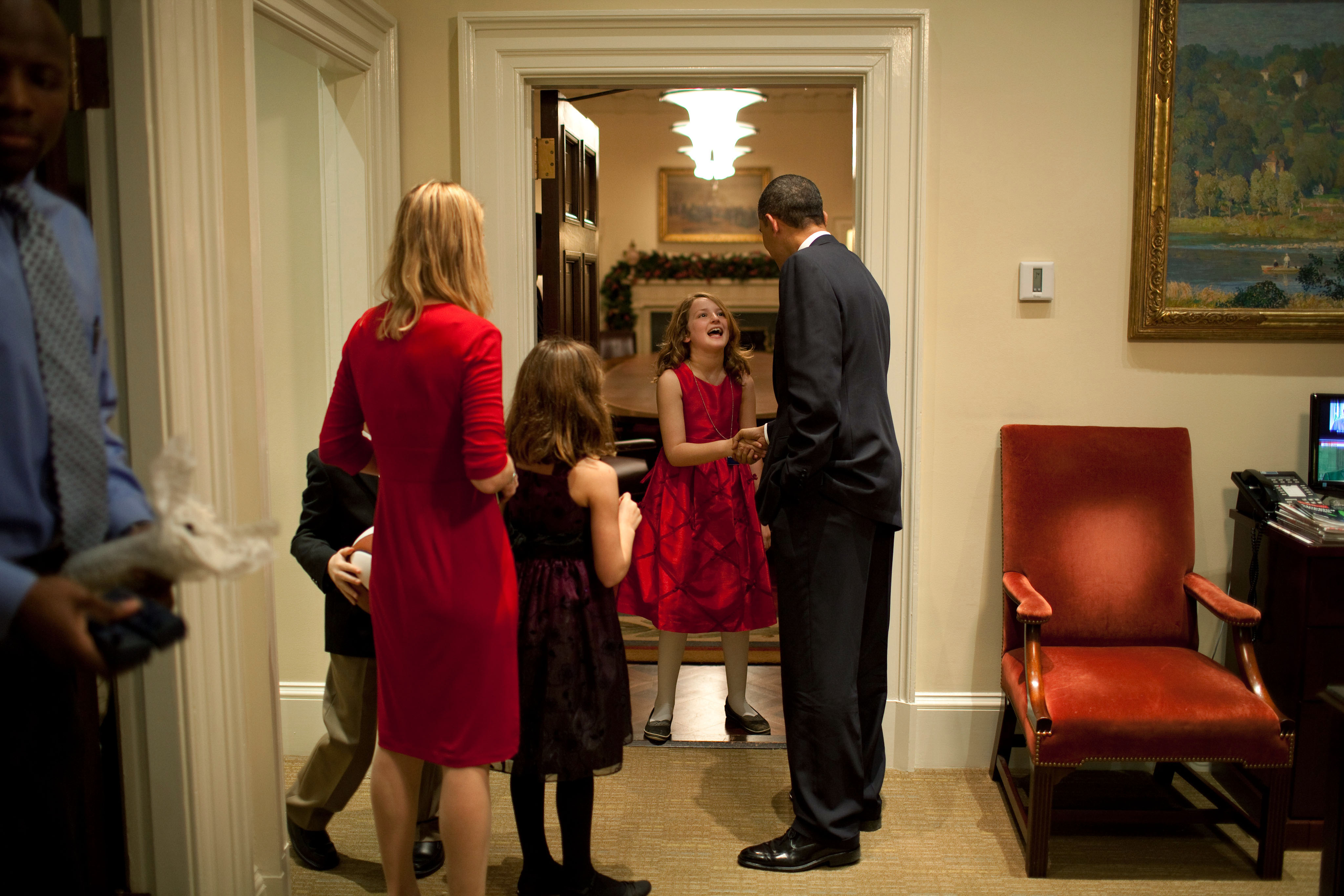
President Barack Obama greeting Stanton and her children upon her departure from the White House in 2009

Katie Jacobs Stanton (born October 17, 1970) is an American executive. She is the Founder and General Partner of Moxxie Ventures. Prior to starting Moxxie Ventures, Stanton was the CMO of Color Genomics and the Vice President of Global Media at Twitter. Stanton was on Forbes list as the 56th most powerful woman in the world. She sits on the list for People Magazine's 25 Most Intriguing People. Stanton has also been featured in Vogue and Fortune Magazine. She worked at Twitter from July 2010 through January 2016. Stanton served on the boards of Time Inc. and Vivendi. In June 2022, Yahoo appointed her to its board of directors.

In January 2010 she was appointed the Special Advisor to the Office of Innovation at the U.S. State Department, where she made extensive use of Twitter. Previously, Barack Obama appointed her to the newly created Director of Citizen Participation position. Stanton is a veteran of Google, where her work has included Google Moderator, Google Finance, and the Open Social initiative. Previously, she was a producer for Yahoo! Finance.

== Education ==
Stanton graduated of Rhodes College with a B.A. in political science in 1991 and received a MIA master's degree in 1995 from Columbia University's School of International and Public Affairs (SIPA). She graduated from Hendrick Hudson High School of Montrose, New York, in 1987.

== Personal life ==
She lived in San Francisco, California while her three children were growing up.

From August to October 2020, during the COVID-19 pandemic, she went on a USA road trip as a digital nomad after the death of her father. She took her dog Taco with her in a Tesla.
