= List of animated television series of 2022 =

This is a list of animated television series that were first aired in 2022.

Title	Seasons	Episodes	Country	Year	Original channel	Technique
13th Street	1	15	Kuwait	2022	VO; Dubai TV; Awaan	Flash
50/50 Heroes	1	52	France; United States	2022–present	CITV; France 4	Flash
Abominable and the Invisible City	2	20	United States	2022–23	Peacock	CGI
Ach du heilige Scheibe: Die Abenteuer von Mimo und Leva	1	26	Germany	2022	KiKa	
Action Pack	2	16	United States; Canada; United Kingdom	2022	Netflix	CGI
Akul Nakul The Asuras			India	2022	Gubbare	
Alabama Jackson	1	7	United States	2022	YouTube	Stop-Motion
Alice's Wonderland Bakery	2	50	United States	2022–24	Disney Junior	CGI
Anna & Friends	1	78	France	2022	France 5 Nickelodeon	CGI
Angry Birds: Summer Madness	3	36	United Kingdom; United States; Canada; Finland	2022	Netflix	Flash
Aquadonk Side Pieces	1	10	United States	2022	YouTube	Flash
Battle Kitty	1	9	United States	2022	Netflix	CGI
Batwheels	3	98	United States	2022–present	Cartoon Network	CGI
Baymax!	1	6	United States	2022	Disney+	CGI
Best & Bester	1	26	Canada; Finland; United Kingdom	2022–23	YTV	Toon Boom Harmony
Bhaiyyaji Balwan			India	2022	Hungama	
Big Nate	2	52	United States	2022–24	Paramount+	CGI
Big Tree City	1	15	United Kingdom	2022	Netflix	CGI
Bird's Eye View	1	8	New Zealand	2022	TVNZ	CGI
The Boss Baby: Back in the Crib	2	28	United States	2022–23	Netflix	CGI
The Boys Presents: Diabolical	1	8	United States	2022	Amazon Prime Video	Traditional/Flash
Bugs Bunny Builders	2	80	United States	2022–25	Cartoon Network (season 1); Max (season 2)	Flash/Traditional
Bunty Billa Aur Babban	2	52	India	2022–present	Discovery Kids	Flash
Cars on the Road	1	9	United States	2022	Disney+	CGI
Chibiverse	3	11	United States	2022–present	Disney Channel	Traditional
City Island	2	40	United States	2022–24	PBS Kids	Toon Boom Harmony
Colourblocks	2	45	United Kingdom	2022–present	CBeebies	CGI
The Creature Cases	7	59	United States	2022–present	Netflix	CGI
The Cuphead Show!	3	36	United States; Canada	2022	Netflix	Flash
Daniel Spellbound	2	20	United States	2022–23	Netflix	CGI
Dead End: Paranormal Park	2	20	United States	2022	Netflix	Flash
El Deafo	1	3	United States	2022	Apple TV+	Toon Boom Harmony
Deepa & Anoop	2	18	United States	2022	Netflix	CGI
Dodo	1	20	United Kingdom	2022–present	Cartoon Network / HBO Max	Flash
Doomlands	2	15	Canada; United States	2022–24	Roku	Flash
Dragon Age: Absolution	1	6	South Korea; Canada	2022	Netflix	Traditional
Dragon Raja: Blazing Dawn	2	40	China	2022–25	Tencent Video	Traditional
Drawn In	1	4	United States	2022	Nine PBS	Flash
Dreamcatchers	2	42	Canada	2022–24	APTN	Flash
Duck & Goose	2	17	United States	2022–23	Apple TV+	Flash
Edmond and Lucy	1	52	France	2022	France 5	CGI
Eureka!	1	30	United States; Ireland	2022–23	Disney Junior	CGI
Face's Music Party	1	16	United States	2022–23	Nickelodeon	Flash/Live-Action
The Fairly OddParents: Fairly Odder	1	13	United States	2022	Paramount+	Flash/Live-Action
Fairview	1	8	United States	2022	Comedy Central	Flash
Farzar	1	10	United States	2022	Netflix	Flash
Fia's Fairies	1	26	Ireland	2022–present	RTÉjr	CGI
Firebuds	3	60	United States	2022–25	Disney Jr.	CGI
FriendZSpace	1	52	Thailand; Australia; Belgium; United States	2022	ABC Me / Discovery Kids	CGI
Ginger and the Vegesaurs	2	40	Australia	2022	ABC Kids	CGI
The Guardians of Justice	1	7	United States	2022	Netflix	Traditional/Live-Action
Hamster & Gretel	2	50	United States	2022–2025	Disney Channel	Traditional
Happy the Hoglet	1	26	Ireland; United Kingdom	2022–present	ITVBe	Flash
Harp and Friends	1	10	South Korea	2022–present	EBS	CGI
Hello Kitty: Super Style!	12	52	France; Italy	2022–24	Canal+ Kids; Rai Yoyo; Canal+ Kids	CGI
A Herbivorous Dragon of 5,000 Years Gets Unfairly Villainized	2	24	China	2022–24	Bilibili	Traditional
Hoot Scoot & What		26	United States	2022	BabyFirst	CGI
Human Resources	2	20	United States	2022–23	Netflix	Flash
I Am Groot	2	10	United States	2022–23	Disney+	CGI
Ice Age: Scrat Tales	1	6	United States	2022	Disney+	CGI
Interrupting Chicken	2	17	United States	2022–23	Apple TV+	Toon Boom Harmony
Interstellar Ella	1	52	Belgium	2022–present	Ketnet	CGI
Jade Armor	2	26	France	2022	Cartoon Network (EMEA); France 4 Super RTL (Germany)	CGI
Jasmine & Jambo	1	52	Spain	2022–present	SX3	Flash
Jeremy and Jazzy	1	30	Canada	2022–present	CBC Kids	Flash
Kockić i prijatelji	1	30	Croatia	2022–present	RTL Kockica	Flash
Kung Fu Panda: The Dragon Knight	3	42	United States	2022–23	Netflix	CGI
The Legend of Vox Machina	3	36	United States	2022–present	Amazon Prime Video	Traditional
Lil Glooscap and the Legends of Turtle Island	1	13	Canada	2022	APTN	Flash
Little Demon	1	10	United States; Canada	2022	FXX	Flash
Little Dreamer Gguda	2	26	South Korea	2022–23	KBS1	CGI
Living with Dad	1	52	France	2022–present	La Trois; M6; Canal J Gulli	Flash
Lloyd of the Flies	1	52	United Kingdom	2022–present	CITV	CGI
Luna, Chip & Inkie: Adventure Rangers Go	1	52	Canada	2022–present	Knowledge Kids	Flash
Me & Mickey	5	120	United States	2022–present	Disney Junior	CGI
Mecha Builders	1	26	United States; Canada	2022–23	Cartoon Network (Cartoonito)	CGI
Mga Kwentong Epik: Ang Alamat ni Maria Makiling	1	6	Philippines	2022	Netflix	Live-Action/Motion-Comic
El món de Pau	1	25	Spain	2022	À Punt	Flash
Monster High	2	50	United States	2022–24	Nickelodeon	CGI
Monster Loving Maniacs	1	52	Denmark	2022	CBBC	Flash
Los Motorjón	1	10	Argentina	2022–present	Pakapaka	Flash
Mumfie	1	78	France; Italy	2022	Rai Yoyo; France 5	CGI
My Daughter Is a Zombie	1	26	South Korea	2022	EBS	Traditional
My Little Pony: Make Your Mark	6	27	United States; Canada	2022–23	Netflix	CGI
My Little Pony: Tell Your Tale	2	94	Canada (season 1); United States (season 2)	2022–24	YouTube	Flash
The Nutty Boy	1	26	Brazil	2022–23	Netflix	Flash
Oddballs	2	20	United States	2022–23	Netflix	Flash
Oggy and the Cockroaches: Next Generation	1	13	France	2022	Netflix	Flash
Oni: Thunder God's Tale	1	4	United States	2022	Netflix	CGI/Stop-Motion
The Pandavas			India	2022	Pogo	CGI
Pantheon	2	16	United States	2022–23	AMC+ (2022); Amazon Prime Video (2023)	Traditional
O Parque de Adelin	1	13	Brazil	2022	TV Cultura	Flash
Peppa Pig Tales	3	156	United Kingdom; Malaysia	2022–present	YouTube	Flash
Petronix Defenders	1	52	France	2022–present	Gulli; Tiny Pop	CGI
Pfffirates	1	52	France	2022	TF1	CGI
Pinecone & Pony	2	16	United States	2022–23	Apple TV+	Flash
Pop Paper City	1	18	United Kingdom	2022–present	Milkshake!	CGI
Polinópolis	1	TBA	Argentina	2022–present	Pakapaka	Flash
Pretzel and the Puppies	2	18	United States	2022–23	Apple TV+	CGI
The Proud Family: Louder and Prouder	3	29	United States	2022–present	Disney+	Traditional/Flash
Puberteens	1	16	Singapore	2022	Channel 5	Flash
Rise Up, Sing Out	2	15	United States	2022–present	Disney Junior	Flash (season 1); Traditional (season 2)
RoBOTIK	1	31	Canada	2022	CBC Kids	CGI
Roro Aur Hero Bhoot Mast Zabardast			India	2022	Gubbare	CGI
Rosie's Rules	2	45	United States; Canada	2022–present	PBS Kids	Flash
S.M.A.S.H.!	1	52	Germany	2022	Super RTL; Discovery Family; HBO Max	CGI
Sago Mini Friends	3	24	Canada; Ireland	2022–present	Apple TV+	Flash
Samurai Rabbit: The Usagi Chronicles	2	20	United States; France	2022	Netflix	CGI
Saving Me	2	20	United States; Canada	2022–present	BYUtv	Flash
Sea of Love	1	15	Thailand	2022	Netflix	Flash
Slippin' Jimmy	1	6	United States	2022	AMC+	Flash
Smiling Friends	3	25	Australia; United States	2022–2026	Adult Swim	Flash (season 1)/Traditional (season 2 onwards)/CGI/Stop-Motion/Live-Action
Sonic Prime	3	23	Canada; United States	2022–24	Netflix	CGI
Spirit Rangers	3	39	United States; Italy	2022–24	Netflix	CGI
StoryBots: Answer Time	2	22	United States	2022–23	Netflix	Flash/Live-Action
Summer Memories	1	20	Canada	2022	Family Channel	Flash
Super Giant Robot Brothers	1	10	United States	2022	Netflix	CGI
Super Wish	1	26	Canada	2022–23	YTV	Flash
Supernatural Academy	1	16	United States	2022	Peacock	CGI
Supertato	4	104	United Kingdom	2022–present	CBeebies	Flash
Tales of the Jedi	1	6	United States	2022	Disney+	CGI
Team Muhafiz	1	10	Pakistan	2022	Geo Entertainment	Flash/CGI/Stop-Motion/Live-Action
Team Zenko Go	2	22	United States; Canada	2022	Netflix	CGI
The Tiny Chef Show	3	31	United States	2022–25	Nickelodeon	Stop-Motion/Live-Action
Transformers: BotBots	1	10	Canada; Ireland; United States	2022	Netflix	Flash
Transformers: EarthSpark	4	46	Canada (season 1); United States (seasons 2–4)	2022–25	Paramount+	CGI
Trivia Quest	1	30	United States	2022	Netflix	Traditional/Flash
The Twisted Timeline of Sammy & Raj	1	20	India	2022	Nickelodeon	Flash
The Unstoppable Yellow Yeti	1	25	Finland; France; United Kingdom; Ireland; United States	2022	Disney Channel; Yle Areena	Toon Boom Harmony
Vikingskool	1	26	France; Ireland	2022	Okoo	Flash
The Vindicators	1	10	United States	2022	YouTube	Flash
We Baby Bears	2	80	United States	2022–present	Cartoon Network	Traditional
Weird Waters	2	20	Canada	2022–23	Tubi	CGI
The Wingfeather Saga	3	19	United States	2022–present	Angel Studios	CGI/Traditional
Zoonicorn	1	25	Canada	2022	Sky Kids	CGI
Zootopia+	1	6	United States	2022	Disney+	CGI

== See also ==
- 2022 in animation
- 2022 in anime
- List of animated feature films of 2022
