= 2022 in animation =

2022 in animation is an overview of notable events, including notable awards, list of films released, television show debuts and endings, and notable deaths.

== Events ==
=== January ===
- January 1: We Baby Bears, a prequel/spin-off series to We Bare Bears, premiered on Cartoon Network.
- January 10: Smiling Friends premiered on Adult Swim to critical acclaim.
- January 14:
  - Dark anthology stop-motion film The House premiered on Netflix.
  - Hotel Transylvania: Transformania, the fourth Hotel Transylvania film, premiered on Amazon Prime Video after numerous delays due to the COVID-19 pandemic.
  - The second season of Deer Squad was released on iQIYI.
- January 21:
  - The following announcements for Big City Greens were revealed:
    - A 4th season renewal.
    - A television movie based on the show.
- January 23: Chickenhare and the Hamster of Darkness made its world premiere at the Gaumont Champs-Élysées theater in Paris, followed by its Netflix debut on June 10.
- January 24: Season 19 of American Dad! begins on TBS with the premiere of the episode "Langley Dollar Listings". The season's premiere was watched by only 518 thousand viewers that night, marking another low in the show's viewership.
- January 28:
  - Mitsuo Iso's The Orbital Children was released simultaneously as a theatrical film in Japan and as a 6-episode miniseries on Netflix internationally, with the last 3 episodes being released on February 11.
  - The Ice Age Adventures of Buck Wild, a spin-off of Ice Age, premiered on Disney+.
  - The Legend of Vox Machina premiered on Amazon Prime Video.
- January 31: After more than 10 years on the air, the NickRewind block aired for the final time on TeenNick.

=== February ===
- February 1: The fourth season of Gabby's Dollhouse premiered on Netflix.
- February 2: Season 25 of South Park begins on Comedy Central with the premiere of the episode "Pajama Day".
- February 3: The third and final season of Kid Cosmic premiered on Netflix.
- February 9:
  - Alice's Wonderland Bakery, a spin-off of the 1951 Disney film Alice in Wonderland, premiered on Disney Junior.
  - The final 10 episodes of season 2 of Disenchantment premiered on Netflix.
  - A second revival of Futurama was announced for Hulu.
- February 17: Big Nate premiered on Paramount+.
- February 18:
  - The Cuphead Show!, based on the video game Cuphead, premiered on Netflix to generally positive reviews.
  - Glitch Productions officially greenlights Murder Drones for a full series.
- February 21: The series finale of Arthur aired on PBS and PBS Kids, concluding the show's run after 25 years.
- February 23: The Proud Family: Louder and Prouder, a sequel series to The Proud Family, premiered on Disney+.

=== March ===
- March 4:
  - The Loud House concludes its fifth season on Nickelodeon with the episodes "Runaway McBride/High Crimes".
- March 6: Toei Animation's systems are hacked, leading to a temporary shutdown of their systems and delays of their series such as One Piece, Digimon Ghost Game, and Delicious Party Pretty Cure, as well as the next Dragon Ball Super film.
- March 11:
  - Turning Red was released on Disney+ instead of being released theatrically. It gained much notoriety upon its premiere owing to the mature themes in a Disney film and was banned in two Asian areas.
  - Season 6 of The Loud House begins on Nickelodeon with the premiere of the episodes "Don't Escar-go/Double Trouble".
- March 12: 49th Annie Awards.
- March 13: The Simpsons episode "You Won't Believe What This Episode Is About – Act Three Will Shock You!" premieres, being the first episode to have all-female creative leads.
- March 16:
  - South Park concludes its 25th season on Comedy Central with the episode "Credigree Weed St. Patrick's Day Special".
  - The first 5 episodes from Season 3 of Big City Greens released on Disney+.
- March 17: The fifteenth and final season of Curious George premiered on Peacock.
- March 25: Season 9 of Paw Patrol begins on Nickelodeon in the US with the premiere of the episodes "Liberty Makes a New Friend/Pups Save the Pup Pup Boogie Contest".
- March 27: 94th Academy Awards:
  - Encanto, directed by Jared Bush and Byron Howard and produced by Walt Disney Animation Studios, won the Academy Award for Best Animated Feature.
  - The Windshield Wiper, directed by Alberto Mielgo and Leo Sanchez, won the Academy Award for Best Animated Short Film.
- March 29: The season 15 finale of Upin & Ipin premiered on MNCTV.
- March 30: Bruce Willis, American actor (voice of the title character in Bruno the Kid, Muddy Grimes in Beavis and Butt-Head Do America, Spike in Rugrats Go Wild, and RJ in Over the Hedge) was announced to be retiring from acting after being diagnosed with aphasia.
- March 31: The Fairly OddParents: Fairly Odder, the live-action sequel series for The Fairly OddParents, premiered on Paramount+.

=== April ===
- April 1:
  - Adult Swim's April Fool's Day prank features Pibby and Bun-Bun from the pitch trailer for an animated series, Learning with Pibby, created by Dodge Greenley, with Nikki Castillo reprising the role of Pibby. The characters and antagonistic glitching force are transported into the night's lineup of shows and make appearances throughout, depicting the events of the pilot from the perspective of the television series the characters would be passing through. The live broadcast received universal critical acclaim and positive reviews from critics and audiences alike.
  - The last 2 episodes from Season 8 of Paw Patrol released on Netflix in Canada, the season later concluded on TVO on May 7.
- April 3: Season 16 of Upin & Ipin premiered on MNCTV.
- April 6: Episodes 11-15 from Season 1 of The Ghost and Molly McGee released on Disney+.
- April 8:
  - The second and final season of Green Eggs and Ham premiered on Netflix.
  - The live-action/animated sequel film Sonic the Hedgehog 2, from Paramount Pictures, is released.
- April 9: Spy × Family broadcasts its first episode.
- April 10: The Simpsons episode "The Sound of Bleeding Gums" premieres, guest-starring John Autry II and Kathy Buckley, marking the first deaf actors to guest star in the show.
- April 11: After the closure of Blue Sky Studios in 2021, it was announced that Nimona had resumed production after being picked up by Annapurna Pictures. It was released on Netflix in June 2023.
- April 12: The Creature Cases premiered on Netflix.
- April 13: Ice Age: Scrat Tales premiered on Disney+ as the final production of Blue Sky Studios following its closure in 2021.
- April 14: Season 2 of the anime series adaptation of Ultraman premiered on Netflix.
- April 18: The season finale of Elinor Wonders Why titled, "A Wonderful Journey", premiered on PBS Kids.
- April 19:
  - The second and final season of Pacific Rim: The Black premiered on Netflix.
  - Interactive series Battle Kitty premiered on Netflix.
- April 21: The Wrap reported that Phil Rynda, Netflix's Director of Creative Leadership and Development for Original Animation, was let go this week, along with several of his staff, and several high-profile animated projects under development had been cancelled, such as an adaptation of the Jeff Smith comic Bone, and Toil & Trouble, an original cartoon by Lauren Faust (My Little Pony: Friendship is Magic). News of the cancellation of more shows that had previously been under development would come out over the coming weeks, such as Boons and Curses (an Indian-themed animated action comedy from Jaydeep Hasrajani and Jake Goldman), Kung Fu Space Punch (a miniseries from Jorge R. Gutierrez set in the same universe as his previous Netflix work Maya and the Three), an Ava DuVernay-produced adaptation of the Wings of Fire novels, and Dino Daycare from Chris Nee (Doc McStuffins).
- April 22: DreamWorks Animation's The Bad Guys premiered in theaters.
- April 24: The Simpsons episode "My Octopus and a Teacher" premieres, marking the debut of Bart's new teacher Ms. Peyton, voiced by Kerry Washington.
- April 27:
  - Episodes 10-14 from Season 3 of Amphibia released on Disney+
  - Episodes 11-16 from Season 2 of The Owl House released on Disney+.
- April 28: Samurai Rabbit: The Usagi Chronicles, a series loosely based on the Usagi Yojimbo comic books, premiered on Netflix.
- April 29: The SpongeBob SquarePants episode "Kwarantined Krab" finally premiered on Nickelodeon after being postponed from 2020 due to its similarities to the COVID-19 pandemic at the time.

=== May ===
- May 1: The 3rd & final season of Duncanville begins on Fox with the premiere of the episode "Gamer vs. Gamer". The season's premiere was watched by only 565 thousand viewers that night.
- May 6: Marmaduke, based on Brad Anderson's comic strip, premiered on Netflix to critical disdain.
- May 14:
  - Amphibia's series finale "The Hardest Thing" premiered on Disney Channel.
  - Season 9 of Paw Patrol begins on TVO in Canada with the premiere of the episodes "Liberty Makes a New Friend/Pups Save the Pup Pup Boogie Contest".
- May 15: The Bob's Burgers episode "Eighth Grade Runner" premieres on Fox, this is the first part of the two-part special "Some Like It Bot".
- May 16: The second half of the third series of Bluey premieres to universal acclaim.
- May 18: Pokémon: Hisuian Snow premiered on the Pokémon YouTube channel and Pokémon TV.
- May 20: Chip 'n Dale: Rescue Rangers, based on the animated series of the same name, premiered on Disney+.
- May 22:
  - The Simpsons concludes its 33rd season on Fox with the episode "Poorhouse Rock", featuring the guest stars Hugh Jackman, Megan Mullally, and Robert Reich. The season's finale was watched by only 927 thousand viewers that night, marking a new low in the show's viewership.
  - The Great North concludes its second season on Fox with the episode "Papa Don't Fiend Adventure". The season's finale was watched by only 691 thousand viewers that night.
  - Bob's Burgers concludes its 12th season on Fox with the episode "Judge-bot Day", which is the second and final part of the two-part special "Some Like It Bot". The season's finale was watched by only 926 thousand viewers that night, marking a new low in the show's viewership.
  - Family Guy concludes its 20th season on Fox with the episode "Jersey Bore". The season's finale was seen by over 1.1 million viewers.
- May 26: My Little Pony: Make Your Mark, the TV series sequel to My Little Pony: A New Generation, premiered on Netflix to mixed-to-negative reviews.
- May 27: The Bob's Burgers Movie, based on the animated series Bob's Burgers, was theatrically released.
- May 28: The season 2 finale of The Owl House, "King's Tide", premiered on Disney Channel.
- May 31: Wil Film (which originally worked on Ninjago) announced that the company is in the process of shutting down.

=== June ===
- June 1: South Park: The Streaming Wars was released on Paramount+.
- June 16:
  - Alberto Vázquez's Unicorn Wars made its world premiere at the Annecy Film Festival.
  - Dead End: Paranormal Park, based on the Cartoon Hangover pilot short by Hamish Steele, premiered on Netflix.
- June 17:
  - The Bluey episodes, "Turtleboy" and "Onesies", premiered to universal acclaim due to the episode's message about the Auslan community and infertility.
  - Pixar's Lightyear premiered in theaters, and is the first film to do so since 2020's Onward due to the COVID-19 pandemic. Some countries, including Muslim world, MENA, and China, refused to release the film for its inclusion of the same-sex kissing scene, while two other countries, Indonesia and Malaysia, gave it an NC-17-based rating because of it.
- June 22: The final 4 episodes of Amphibia released on Disney+, just a month after the series ended.
- June 23:
  - Beavis and Butt-Head Do the Universe, a feature film based on Beavis and Butt-Head, was released on Paramount+.
  - YouTuber and cartoonist TheOdd1sOut announced that he created a new series called Oddballs, which was released on Netflix on October 7.
  - The Bluey episode, "Space", premiered to critical acclaim. It is notably the first episode in the series to end on a cliffhanger.
- June 25: The second season of Strawberry Shortcake: Berry in the Big City premiered on YouTube.
- June 26: The Duncanville episode "Moneyballs" premiered on Fox, this was the last episode to air on the network as the last 6 episodes would release on Hulu 4 months later.
- June 29:
  - Baymax!, a spin-off of Big Hero 6, premiered on Disney+.
  - The final 5 episodes from Season 2 of The Owl House released on Disney+, just a month after the season concluded.

=== July ===
- July 1: Minions: The Rise of Gru premiered in theaters after two years of delays due to the COVID-19 pandemic.
- July 8: The Sea Beast premiered on Netflix.
- July 9: The Ghost and Molly McGee concludes its first season on Disney Channel with the premiere of its two-part episode finale "The Jig is Up/Molly Vs. The Ghost World".
- July 13: South Park: The Streaming Wars Part 2 was released on Paramount+.
- July 14: Kung Fu Panda: The Dragon Knight, a TV series based on the Kung Fu Panda franchise, premiered on Netflix.
- July 19: Netflix acquires animation studio Animal Logic.
- July 22: The 3rd and final season of Meta Runner premiered on YouTube on the GLITCH channel, with the release of the episode "Power Down".
- July 25:
  - Bugs Bunny Builders, the second Looney Tunes TV series for preschoolers, premiered on Cartoon Network under the Cartoonito block.
  - The fifth season of Gabby's Dollhouse premiered on Netflix.
- July 27: Episodes 6-9 from Season 3 of Big City Greens released on Disney+ (Episode 9 was released 3 days before premiering on Disney Channel).
- July 28: Oggy and the Cockroaches: Next Generation, a reboot series of Oggy and the Cockroaches, premiered on Netflix.
- July 30:
  - Season 2 premiere of Vivienne Medrano's independent webseries Helluva Boss, titled "The Circus", was released on YouTube.
  - Chibiverse, a television series based on the Chibi Tiny Tales shorts by Disney, premiered on Disney Channel.
- Specific date in July unknown: A short montage of scenes from the 1988 Soviet animated film Treasure Island involving the colorful character Dr. Livesey are edited with the instrumental Why Not by Ghostface Playa on the soundtrack. The video quickly becomes a viral hit under the title Dr. Livesey's Walk.

=== August ===
- August 2: Alongside the high-profile news of the cancellation of Adil El Arbi and Bilall Fallah's Batgirl film, The Hollywood Reporter also reported that Warner Brothers Discovery also decided to shelve Scoob!: Holiday Haunt, a sequel to the 2020 film, as part of cost-cutting measures.
- August 3: The final 5 episodes from Season 1 of The Ghost and Molly McGee released on Disney+, just a month after the season concluded.
- August 4:
  - A second revival of Beavis and Butt-Head premiered on Paramount+.
  - Super Giant Robot Brothers premiered on Netflix.
- August 5:
  - Skydance Animation's first animated film, Luck, released on Apple TV+.
  - Rise of the Teenage Mutant Ninja Turtles: The Movie released on Netflix.
- August 12: Hamster & Gretel premiered on Disney Channel.
- August 17:
  - Variety reported that the HBO Max streaming service was to have 36 titles removed, including animated series such as Infinity Train, OK K.O., Summer Camp Island and Victor and Valentino, the latter of which also aired its final episodes on Cartoon Network on 26 August. The following week, it was also reported that several animated projects previously slated to premiere on HBO Max were instead being shopped, and that Driftwood, an animated feature from Cartoon Network Studios by Victor Courtwright, was cancelled just three months after originally being announced.
  - The first 5 episodes of Hamster & Gretel were released on Disney+, with episodes 3-5 being released before premiering on Disney Channel.
- August 19: The second season of The Cuphead Show! premiered on Netflix.
- August 20: Kanbar Entertainment was closed when the studio's founder and producer, Maurice Kanbar died at 93 in San Francisco, CA
- August 25: Little Demon premiered on FXX.
- August 29: Netflix celebrated its twenty-fifth anniversary.

=== September ===
- September 1: Season 2 of Samurai Rabbit: The Usagi Chronicles premiered on Netflix.
- September 4: The sixth season of Rick and Morty premiered on Adult Swim.
- September 8: Cars on the Road, a series based on the Cars franchise, premiered on Disney+ as part of Disney+ Day.
- September 9:
  - The Tiny Chef Show premiered on Nickelodeon.
  - The Meta Runner series finale "The End" premiered on YouTube on the GLITCH channel.
- September 13: Cyberpunk: Edgerunners, a limited series based on the video game Cyberpunk 2077, premiered on Netflix.
- September 15:
  - Season 2 of the Dogs in Space animated series released on Netflix.
- September 19: The third season of Go, Dog. Go!, a series based on the children's books of the same name, premiered on Netflix.
- September 23: Illumination announced the launch of an adult-animation division, Moonlight, headed by former Netflix Animation executive Mike Moon.
- September 24: Olan Rogers announced on Twitter that his show Final Space had been pulled from availability by Warner Brothers Discovery for a tax write-off.
- September 25:
  - Season 34 of The Simpsons begins on Fox with the premiere of the episode "Habeas Tortoise". The season's premiere was seen by over 4.1 million viewers that night.
  - Season 3 of The Great North begins on Fox with the premiere of the episode "A Knife to Remember Adventure". The season's premiere was seen by over 2.1 million viewers that night.
  - Season 13 of Bob's Burgers begins on Fox with the premiere of the episode "To Bob, or Not to Bob". The season's premiere was seen by over 1.6 million viewers that night.
  - Season 21 of Family Guy begins on Fox with the premiere of the episode "Oscars Guy". The season's premiere was seen by over 1.5 million viewers that night.
- September 30: The Casagrandes, a spin-off of The Loud House, aired its final episode.

=== October ===
- October 1: Ninjago ends after eleven years; the show released its final batch of Season 15 episodes on Netflix.
- October 3: Rosie's Rules premiered on PBS Kids to critical acclaim.
- October 4: The Scooby-Doo direct-to-video Halloween film Trick or Treat Scooby-Doo! releases on Digital services, later released on DVD on October 18. Velma Dinkley is shown to be attracted to other women in this movie, making fans believe she is either a Lesbian or Bisexual.
- October 6:
  - The teaser trailer for The Super Mario Bros. Movie was revealed in a Nintendo Direct presentation, to be released in 2023.
  - Monster High premiered on Nickelodeon as a sneak peek following Monster High: The Movie prior to its official premiere on October 28.
- October 7: Oddballs, a new animated series based on James Rallison's YouTube channel TheOdd1sOut, premiered on Netflix.
- October 11: A direct-to-video Mortal Kombat animated film, titled "Mortal Kombat Legends: Snow Blind", was released.
- October 12: Episodes 10-13 from Season 3 of Big City Greens released on Disney+ (Episode 13 was released 3 days before premiering on Disney Channel).
- October 13: The second and final season of Dead End: Paranormal Park was released on Netflix.
- October 15: The first episode of the three-part final season of The Owl House premiered on Disney Channel; the other two are slated for release in 2023.
- October 18: The final 6 episodes of Duncanville premiered on Hulu.
- October 19: The second episode in Season 2 of Helluva Boss, titled "Shooting Stars", premiered on YouTube.
- October 26:
  - Star Wars: Tales premieres on Disney+.
  - Episodes 6-10 of Hamster & Gretel released on Disney+.
- October 27:
  - The second half of the first season of Star Trek: Prodigy premiered on Paramount+.
  - Daniel Spellbound premiered on Netflix.
- October 28:
  - Wendell & Wild was released on Netflix.
  - Season 6 of Big Mouth premiered on Netflix.
- October 30: In the Death Tome segment of The Simpsons episode Treehouse of Horror XXXIII, the manga Death Note is parodied by having the original animation staff of the Death Note anime adaptation animate everything.

=== November ===
- November 1: The sixth season of Gabby's Dollhouse was released on Netflix.
- November 8: Aqua Teen Forever: Plantasm, a feature film based on Aqua Teen Hunger Force, was released on home media before linear and streaming debuts.
- November 9: Zootopia+ was released on Disney+.
- November 11:
  - My Father's Dragon was released on Netflix.
  - Transformers: EarthSpark was released on Paramount+.
- November 15: The trailer for the animated series Pibby won a Clio Entertainment Award for Best Original Content at the 2022 Clio Awards.
- November 18:
  - The third and final season of The Cuphead Show! was released on Netflix.
  - Let's Go Luna airs its final episode on PBS Kids.
  - The second episode of Murder Drones, titled "Heartbeat", was released on YouTube on the GLITCH channel.
- November 20: King Tweety, a direct-to-video film based on Looney Tunes, was released on HBO Max.
- November 21: A new StoryBots series, StoryBots: Answer Time, premiered on Netflix.
- November 23: Walt Disney Animation Studios's 61st animated film Strange World was released in theaters.
- November 27: The stop motion animated Mickey Mouse & Friends Christmas special Mickey Saves Christmas premiered on Disney Channel, Disney XD, Disney Junior, and ABC.

=== December ===
- December 2: Andrew Peterson's The Wingfeather Saga premiered on Angel Studios.
- December 3: The animated film version of Diary of a Wimpy Kid: Rodrick Rules premiered on Disney+.
- December 9:
  - Guillermo del Toro's Pinocchio was released on Netflix.
  - The Mighty Ones releases its fourth and final season on Peacock.
- December 10–11: The first Children's & Family Emmy Awards are held at the Wilshire Ebell Theater in Los Angeles.
- December 14:
  - The 1989 Disney animated feature The Little Mermaid is inducted in the National Film Registry for its cultural, historical and aesthetical importance.
  - Huevitos congelados, the fifth and final Huevos film, is released on VIX.
  - The Haunted House: The Dimensional Goblin and the Seven Worlds was released in theaters from The Haunted House series in South Korea.
- December 15: Sonic Prime, a CGI series based on the Sonic the Hedgehog franchise, premiered on Netflix.
- December 19: American Dad! concludes its 19th season on TBS with the Christmas special "The Grouch". The season's finale was watched by 230 thousand viewers that night, marking another low in the show's viewership.
- December 21: DreamWorks Animation's Puss in Boots: The Last Wish, the sequel to Puss in Boots, was released in theaters.

== Awards ==
- Academy Award for Best Animated Feature: Encanto
- Academy Award for Best Animated Short Film: The Windshield Wiper
- American Cinema Editors Award for Best Edited Animated Feature Film: Encanto
- Annecy International Animated Film Festival Cristal du long métrage: Little Nicholas: Happy As Can Be
- Annie Award for Best Animated Feature: The Mitchells vs. the Machines
- Annie Award for Best Animated Feature — Independent: Flee
- Astra Film Award for Best Animated Film: The Mitchells vs. the Machines
- Austin Film Critics Association Award for Best Animated Film: The Mitchells vs. the Machines
- BAFTA Award for Best Animated Film: Encanto
- BAFTA Award for Best Short Animation: Do Not Feed the Pigeons
- Boston Society of Film Critics Award for Best Animated Film: Flee
- Central Ohio Film Critics Association Awards for Best Animated Feature: The Mitchells vs. the Machines
- César Award for Best Animated Film: The Summit of the Gods
- Chicago Film Critics Association Award for Best Animated Film: Flee
- Critics' Choice Movie Award for Best Animated Feature: The Mitchells vs. the Machines
- Critics' Choice Television Award for Best Animated Series: What If...?
- Dallas–Fort Worth Film Critics Association Award for Best Animated Film: Encanto
- European Film Award for Best Animated Feature Film: Flee
- Florida Film Critics Circle Award for Best Animated Film: Encanto
- Golden Globe Award for Best Animated Feature Film: Encanto
- Golden Reel Award for Outstanding Achievement in Sound Editing – Sound Effects, Foley, Dialogue and ADR for Animated Feature Film: Raya and the Last Dragon
- Goya Award for Best Animated Film: Valentina
- Japan Academy Film Prize for Animation of the Year: Evangelion: 3.0+1.0 Thrice Upon a Time
- Kids' Choice Award for Favorite Animated Movie: Encanto
- Los Angeles Film Critics Association Award for Best Animated Film: Flee
- Mainichi Film Award for Best Animation Film: The House of the Lost on the Cape
- NAACP Image Award for Outstanding Animated Motion Picture: Encanto
- National Board of Review Award for Best Animated Film: Encanto
- New York Film Critics Circle Award for Best Animated Film: The Mitchells vs. the Machines
- Online Film Critics Society Award for Best Animated Film: The Mitchells vs. the Machines
- Producers Guild of America Award for Best Animated Motion Picture: Encanto
- San Diego Film Critics Society Award for Best Animated Film: Luca
- San Francisco Film Critics Circle Award for Best Animated Feature: Encanto
- Satellite Award for Best Animated or Mixed Media Feature: Encanto
- Saturn Award for Best Animated Film: Marcel the Shell with Shoes On
- Seattle Film Critics Society Award for Best Animated Feature: Flee
- St. Louis Gateway Film Critics Association Award for Best Animated Film: The Mitchells vs. the Machines
- Tokyo Anime Award: Evangelion: 3.0+1.0 Thrice Upon a Time
- Toronto Film Critics Association Award for Best Animated Film: Flee
- Visual Effects Society Award for Outstanding Visual Effects in an Animated Feature: Encanto
- Washington D.C. Area Film Critics Association Award for Best Animated Feature: The Mitchells vs. the Machines

== Television series debuts ==
Date	Title	Channel, Streaming	Year
January 1	We Baby Bears	Cartoon Network	2022–present
January 4	Action Pack	Netflix	2022
January 7	El Deafo	Apple TV+	2022
January 9	My Dress-Up Darling	Tokyo MX, Crunchyroll	2022–2025
January 10	Smiling Friends	Adult Swim	2022–2026
January 20	Supernatural Academy	Peacock	2022
January 28	Angry Birds: Summer Madness	Netflix	2022
January 28	Doomlands	Roku	2022–present
January 28	The Legend of Vox Machina	Amazon Prime Video	2022–present
February 9	Alice's Wonderland Bakery	Disney Junior	2022–2024
February 9	Fairview	Comedy Central	2022
February 11	Pretzel and the Puppies	Apple TV+	2022–2023
February 15	Alabama Jackson	YouTube	2022
February 17	Big Nate	Paramount+	2022–2024
February 18	The Cuphead Show!	Netflix	2022
February 23	The Proud Family: Louder and Prouder	Disney+	2022–2026
March 1	The Guardians of Justice	Netflix	2022
March 4	The Boys Presents: Diabolical	Amazon Prime Video	2022
March 15	Team Zenko Go	Netflix	2022
March 18	Human Resources	Netflix	2022–2023
March 25	Transformers: BotBots	Netflix	2022
March 31	The Fairly OddParents: Fairly Odder	Paramount+	2022
April 8	Pinecone & Pony	Apple TV+	2022–2023
April 9	Spy × Family	TV Tokyo, Crunchyroll	2022–present
April 12	The Creature Cases	Netflix	2022–present
April 13	Ice Age: Scrat Tales	Disney+	2022
April 14	Summer Time Rendering	Tokyo MX, Disney+, Hulu	2022
April 15	Lightning Wolves	Comedy Central	2022
April 19	Battle Kitty	Netflix	2022
April 28	DoDo	Cartoon Network, HBO Max	2022
April 28	Samurai Rabbit: The Usagi Chronicles	Netflix	2022
April 30	Mecha Builders	Cartoonito, HBO Max	2022–2023
May 19	The Boss Baby: Back in the Crib	Netflix	2022–2023
May 23	Sea of Love	Netflix	2022
May 23	Slippin' Jimmy	AMC+	2022
May 26	My Little Pony: Make Your Mark	Netflix	2022–2023
June 3	Face's Music Party	Nickelodeon	2022–2023
June 16	Dead End: Paranormal Park	Netflix	2022–2023
June 22	Eureka!	Disney Junior	2022–2023
June 29	Baymax!	Disney+	2022
July 2	Lycoris Recoil	Tokyo MX, Crunchyroll	2022
July 8	Duck & Goose	Apple TV+	2022–2023
July 14	Kung Fu Panda: The Dragon Knight	Netflix	2022–2023
July 15	Farzar	Netflix	2022
July 25	Bugs Bunny Builders	Cartoonito, HBO Max	2022–present
July 28	Oggy and the Cockroaches: Next Generation	Netflix	2022
July 30	Chibiverse	Disney Channel	2022–present
August 1	Big Tree City	Netflix	2022
August 4	Beavis and Butt-Head (revival)	Paramount+	2022–present
August 4	Super Giant Robot Brothers	Netflix	2022
August 10	I Am Groot	Disney+	2022–2023
August 12	Hamster & Gretel	Disney Channel	2022–2025
August 15	Deepa & Anoop	Netflix	2022
August 25	Little Demon	FXX	2022
September 1	Pantheon	AMC+	2022–2023
September 6	Bee and PuppyCat	Netflix	2022
September 8	Cars on the Road	Disney+	2022
September 9	The Tiny Chef Show	Nickelodeon	2022–2025
September 13	Cyberpunk: Edgerunners	Netflix	2022
September 16	Sago Mini Friends	Apple TV+	2022–2024
September 17	Batwheels	Cartoonito, HBO Max	2022–present
September 21	Firebuds	Disney+, Disney Junior	2022–2025
October 1	Saving Me	BYUtv	2022–present
October 2	Mobile Suit Gundam: The Witch from Mercury	MBS, TBS, Crunchyroll	2022–2023
October 3	Rosie's Rules	PBS Kids	2022–present
October 5	Abominable and the Invisible City	Hulu, Peacock	2022–2023
October 6	Monster High	Nickelodeon	2022–2024
October 7	Oddballs	Netflix	2022–2023
October 9	Bocchi the Rock!	Tokyo MX, Crunchyroll	2022–present
October 10	Spirit Rangers	Netflix	2022–2024
October 11	Chainsaw Man	TV Tokyo, Crunchyroll	2022–present
October 21	Oni: Thunder God's Tale	Netflix	2022
October 21	Pokémon Ultimate Journeys: The Series	Netflix	2022–2023
October 26	Tales of the Jedi	Disney+	2022–2025
October 27	Daniel Spellbound	Netflix	2022–2023
November 9	Zootopia+	Disney+	2022
November 11	Transformers: EarthSpark	Paramount+	2022–2025
November 18	Interrupting Chicken	Apple TV+	2022–2023
November 21	StoryBots: Answer Time	Netflix	2022–2023
December 2	The Wingfeather Saga	Angel Studios	2022–present
December 7	Hello Kitty: Super Style!	Amazon Prime Video	2022–2024
December 9	Dragon Age: Absolution	Netflix	2022
December 15	Sonic Prime	Netflix	2022–2024

== Television series endings ==
Date	Title	Channel, Streaming	Year	Notes
January 4	Hero Elementary	PBS Kids	2020–2022	Ended
January 7	El Deafo	Apple TV+	2022	Ended
January 7	Johnny Test (2021)	Netflix	2021–2022	Ended
February 3	Kid Cosmic	Netflix	2021–2022	Ended
February 17	Yabba-Dabba Dinosaurs	HBO Max	2021–2022	Cancelled
February 18	Fancy Nancy	Disney Junior	2018–2022	Ended
February 18	Muppet Babies	Disney Junior	2018–2022	Ended
February 21	Arthur	PBS Kids	1996–2022	Ended
March 3	Little Ellen	HBO Max	2021–2022	Ended
March 17	Curious George	PBS Kids, Peacock	2006–2022	Ended
March 25	Transformers: BotBots	Netflix	2022	Ended
March 26	Let's Go Luna!	PBS Kids, TVOKids	2018–2022	Ended
March 30	Fairview	Comedy Central	2022	Ended
March 31	The Fairly OddParents: Fairly Odder	Paramount+	2022	Halted
April 1	The VeggieTales Show	TBN	2019–2022	Ended
April 2	Abby Hatcher	Nick Jr. Channel	2018–2022	Ended
April 7	Close Enough	HBO Max	2020–2022	Cancelled
April 8	Green Eggs and Ham	Netflix	2019–2022	Ended
April 13	Ice Age: Scrat Tales	Disney+	2022	Ended
April 15	Rainbow Rangers	Nick Jr. Channel	2018–2022	Ended
April 19	Pacific Rim: The Black	Netflix	2021–2022	Ended
April 22	The Chicken Squad	Disney Junior	2021–2022	Cancelled
May 14	Amphibia	Disney Channel	2019–2022	Ended
May 26	Pokémon Master Journeys: The Series	Netflix	2021–2022	Ended
May 26	Tig n' Seek	HBO Max	2020–2022	Cancelled
June 9	Young Justice	HBO Max	2010–2022	Cancelled
June 10	T.O.T.S.	Disney Junior	2019–2022	Ended
June 20	Mira, Royal Detective	Disney Junior	2020–2022	Ended
June 30	Madagascar: A Little Wild	Hulu, Peacock	2020–2022	Ended
July 15	Farzar	Netflix	2022	Cancelled
July 21	Jurassic World Camp Cretaceous	Netflix	2020–2022	Ended
July 22	Total DramaRama	Cartoon Network	2018–2022	Ended
August 5	Star Trek: Prodigy	Paramount+ / Nickelodeon	2021–2022	Ended
August 11	Trolls: TrollsTopia	Hulu, Peacock	2020–2022	Ended
August 25	Angry Birds: Summer Madness	Netflix	2022	Cancelled
August 26	Victor and Valentino	Cartoon Network	2019–2022	Cancelled
August 29	Tuca & Bertie	Adult Swim	2019–2022	Cancelled
September 9	Meta Runner	YouTube	2019–2022	Ended
September 30	Wolfboy and the Everything Factory	Apple TV+	2021–2022	Cancelled
September 30	The Casagrandes	Nickelodeon	2019–2022	Cancelled
October 1	Ninjago	Cartoon Network, Netflix	2011–2022	Ended
October 13	Dead End: Paranormal Park	Netflix	2022	Cancelled
October 13	Pantheon	AMC+	2022	Cancelled
October 18	Duncanville	Fox, Hulu	2020–2022	Cancelled
October 21	Oni: Thunder God's Tale	Netflix	2022	Ended
October 21	Middlemost Post	Nickelodeon	2021–2022	Cancelled
November 14	Gigantosaurus	Disney Junior	2019–2022	Ended
November 18	Central Park	Apple TV+	2020–2022	Cancelled
November 18	Inside Job	Netflix	2021–2022	Cancelled
December 9	The Mighty Ones	Hulu / Peacock	2020–2022	Cancelled
December 16	Paradise PD	Netflix	2018–2022	Ended

== Television season premieres ==
Date	Title	Season	Channel, Streaming
January 24	American Dad!	19	TBS
February 2	South Park	25	Comedy Central
March 11	The Loud House	6	Nickelodeon
March 17	Jellystone!	2	HBO Max
March 25	Paw Patrol	9	Nickelodeon (Note: Season later premiered in Canada on TVO on May 14th.)
May 1	Duncanville	3	Fox
June 25	Strawberry Shortcake: Berry in the Big City	2	YouTube, Family Jr.
July 22	Meta Runner	3	YouTube
July 30	Helluva Boss	2	YouTube
August 19	The Cuphead Show!	2	Netflix
September 4	Rick and Morty	6	Adult Swim (Cartoon Network)
September 25	Bob's Burgers	13	Fox
September 25	Family Guy	21	Fox
September 25	The Great North	3	Fox
September 25	The Simpsons	34	Fox
October 7	Teen Titans Go!	8	Cartoon Network
October 15	The Owl House	3	Disney Channel
October 28	Big Mouth	6	Netflix
November 18	The Cuphead Show!	3	Netflix
December 4	HouseBroken	2	Fox

== Television season finales ==
Date	Title	Season	Channel, Streaming
February 18	The Cuphead Show!	1	Netflix
March 4	The Loud House	5	Nickelodeon
March 16	South Park	25	Comedy Central
March 17	Jellystone!	2	HBO Max
April 1	Paw Patrol	8	Netflix (Canada) (Note: Season finale later aired on TVO on May 7th; Season later concluded in the US on Nickelodeon on April 21, 2023.)
April 20	The Proud Family: Louder and Prouder	1	Disney+
April 29	SpongeBob SquarePants	12	Nickelodeon
May 22	Bob's Burgers	12	Fox
May 22	Family Guy	20	Fox
May 22	The Great North	2	Fox
May 22	The Simpsons	33	Fox
May 28	The Owl House	2	Disney Channel
June 5	Strawberry Shortcake: Berry in the Big City	1	YouTube, Family Jr.
July 9	The Ghost and Molly McGee	1	Disney Channel
August 6	Smiling Friends	1	Adult Swim (Cartoon Network)
August 19	The Cuphead Show!	2	Netflix
September 16	Teen Titans Go!	7	Cartoon Network
October 28	Big Mouth	6	Netflix
December 11	Rick and Morty	6	Adult Swim (Cartoon Network)
December 15	Sonic Prime	1	Netflix
December 19	American Dad!	19	TBS

== Deaths ==
=== January ===
- January 4: Joan Copeland, American actress (voice of Tanana in Brother Bear), dies at age 99.
- January 6: Peter Bogdanovich, American director, writer, actor, producer, critic and film historian (voice of Psychologist in The Simpsons episode "Yokel Chords"), dies at age 82.
- January 9
  - Bob Saget, American comedian, actor, television host and director (voice of Zoo Animal in Madagascar, Dash in Casper's Scare School, Party Marty in The Life & Times of Tim, Mike O'Malley, Galactus and Cable Guy in Robot Chicken), dies from head trauma at age 65.
  - Dwayne Hickman, American actor, television executive, producer and director (voice of Aladdin in 1001 Arabian Nights), dies from Parkinson's disease at age 87.
  - KJ Schrock, American actor (WOWNow Entertainment), dies at age 55.
- January 10:
  - Ian Greenberg, Canadian businessman and media pioneer (co-founder of Astral Media, former owner of Family Channel), dies at age 79.
  - Shinji Mizushima, Japanese manga artist (Dokaben), dies from pneumonia at age 82.
- January 15: Michael Jackson, British-American talk radio host and actor (voice of Jennings in The Lionhearts, Ganthet in Green Lantern: Emerald Knights, Alfred Pennyworth in Batman: The Dark Knight Returns), dies from Parkinson's disease at age 87.
- January 18: Peter Robbins, American former child actor (voice of Charlie Brown in A Charlie Brown Christmas, Charlie Brown's All Stars!, It's the Great Pumpkin, Charlie Brown, You're in Love, Charlie Brown, He's Your Dog, Charlie Brown, It Was a Short Summer, Charlie Brown and A Boy Named Charlie Brown), commits suicide at age 65.
- January 19: Gaspard Ulliel, French actor (dub voice of Jack Frost in Rise of the Guardians), dies in a skiing accident at age 37.
- January 20: Meat Loaf, American rock singer and actor (voiced himself in the South Park episode "Chef Aid"), dies from COVID-19 at age 74.
- January 21: Louie Anderson, American actor, comedian, author and game show host (voice of Security Guard #1 in Bebe's Kids, Gory Agnes in Pickle and Peanut, Chester in Tig n' Seek, Burt in The Grim Adventures of Billy & Mandy episode "Fear and Loathing in Endsville", Mining Team of Louie Andersons in the Tom Goes to the Mayor episode "White Collarless", himself in the No Activity episode "40 Days & 40 Nights", creator, producer and voice of Andy Anderson and Little Louie in Life with Louie), dies from cancer at age 68.
- January 23:
  - Renato Cecchetto, Italian actor (dub voice of Hamm in Toy Story, P.T. Flea in A Bug's Life, Shrek in the Shrek franchise, the Abominable Snowman in Monsters, Inc. and Monsters University, School of Moonfish in Finding Nemo, Uncle Max in The Lion King 1½, Mack in Cars, Mustafa in Ratatouille, John in WALL-E, Tom in Up, Mr. Trout in The Boxtrolls, Razaq in The Breadwinner, Meow Meow Fuzzyface in BoJack Horseman, Fritz in Inside Out, Earl in The Good Dinosaur, Bill in Finding Dory, Juan Ortodoncia in Coco, Cleveland Brown in seasons 12-19 of Family Guy, Mr. Ellingboe in Klaus), dies from complications from a moped accident at age 70.
  - Sandy Wogatzke, American animation checker (Jetsons: The Movie), dies at age 95.
- January 25: Jonathan Finn-Gamiño, American character designer (American Dad!) and storyboard artist (American Dad!, Big Mouth), dies at age 32.
- January 26: Myrna Bushman, American animation checker (Ruby-Spears Enterprises, DIC Entertainment), storyboard artist (DIC Entertainment, Jetlag Productions, Daisy-Head Mayzie, Doug, PB&J Otter, Stanley), sheet timer (Spiral Zone, Tiny Toon Adventures, Stunt Dawgs, All-New Dennis the Menace, Jumbo Pictures), production assistant (Marvel Productions), production coordinator (Disney Television Animation) and director (Muppet Babies, Bill & Ted's Excellent Adventures, Doug), dies at age 85.
- January 30:
  - Maya Buzinova, Russian animator (The Mitten, Gena the Crocodile, Cheburashka), dies at age 92.
  - Calvin Remsberg, American actor and stage director (voice of Merry Man in Shrek), dies at age 72.
- January 31: Flemming Quist Møller, Danish director (Benny's Bathtub, Jungledyret Hugo), animator, author, drummer, screenwriter and actor (voice of the Feather King in Beyond Beyond), dies from a heart attack at age 79.

=== February ===
- February 1:
  - Isaac Bardavid, Brazilian actor (dub voice of Skeletor in He-Man and the Masters of the Universe, Tigger in Winnie the Pooh), dies at age 90.
  - Staci Maniskas, American ink & paint artist (Bugs Bunny's Looney Christmas Tales, Bugs Bunny's Bustin' Out All Over, Hey Good Lookin', Filmation, Rover Dangerfield) and final checker (The Mouse and His Child), dies at age 87.
- February 2: Robert Blalack, Panamanian-born American visual effects artist (co-founder of Industrial Light & Magic), dies from cancer at age 73.
- February 4: Lina Gagnon, Canadian animator (National Film Board of Canada), dies at age 75.
- February 6:
  - Dylan Hoffman, American technical director and rigging artist (Walt Disney Animation Studios, Kamp Koral: SpongeBob's Under Years), dies from a motorbike accident at age 33.
  - Saki Nitta, Japanese actress (voice of Pakuri in Kill la Kill and Bridget Faye and Cache Dop in D.Gray-man Hallow, and dub voice of Dogo in The Lion Guard, Bullied Sheep in Zootopia, and Rosa Rivera in Coco), dies at age 31.
- February 8:
  - Borivoj Dovniković, Croatian film director, animator and caricaturist (Veliki Miting), dies at age 91.
  - Toshiya Ueda, Japanese actor (voice of Titicaca in The Adventures of Pepero, Futon in Rascal the Raccoon, Nefertari Cobra in One Piece, and Vilk in The Promised Neverland, dub voice of Uncle Chuck Hedgehog in Sonic the Hedgehog, Dr. Benjamin Boris Zachary Karbunkle in Biker Mice from Mars, Owl in Winnie the Pooh, and Aloysius in Infinity Train), dies at age 88.
  - Anne D. Bernstein, American television writer (Video Power, KaBlam!, MTV Animation, The Backyardigans, Viva Piñata, Angelo Rules, Kit and Kate, Super Wings), dies from Parkinson's disease at age 60.
- February 12:
  - Ivan Reitman, Slovak-born Canadian film and television director, screenwriter and producer (Heavy Metal, Beethoven, Space Jam, Mummies Alive!, Alienators: Evolution Continues), dies at age 75.
  - Manabu Ôhashi, Japanese animator (Toei Animation, TMS Entertainment, Madhouse, Tomorrow's Joe, Robot Carnival, Venus Wars, Roujin Z, Junkers Come Here, Legend of Crystania, Jungle Emperor Leo, A Tree of Palme, Black Jack, Children Who Chase Lost Voices, Patema Inverted, Bodacious Space Pirates: Abyss of Hyperspace, Harmony), art director, writer and director (Robot Carnival), dies at age 73.
- February 19: Maggy Reno Hurchalla, American environmental activist (voice of Janet Reno in The Simpsons episode "Dark Knight Court"), dies from cardiac arrest at age 81.
- February 24: Sally Kellerman, American actress, singer and author (voice of The Seal in The Mouse and His Child, Sunburn in Happily Ever After, the Narrator in Delgo, Principal Stark in Unsupervised, Marshmallow Queen and Romaine Empress in The High Fructose Adventures of Annoying Orange, Dolores Barren in High School USA!), dies from heart failure at age 84.
- February 25: Farrah Forke, American actress (voice of Big Barda/Barda Free in Batman Beyond and Justice League Unlimited, herself in the Duckman episode "Aged Heat 2: Women in Heat"), dies from cancer at age 54.
- February 27: Charles Csuri, American artist and computer art pioneer, dies at age 99.
- February 28:
  - Kirk Baily, American actor (voice of adult Millions Knives in Trigun, Shin in Cowboy Bebop, Robber D in Cowboy Bebop: The Movie, additional voices in The Brave Little Toaster, Mobile Suit Gundam 0083: Stardust Memory, Aladdin, Ah! My Goddess: The Movie, The Road to El Dorado, Metropolis, Sinbad: Legend of the Seven Seas, Mickey, Donald, Goofy: The Three Musketeers, Shark Tale, Mickey's Twice Upon a Christmas, Over the Hedge, Open Season, The Little Mermaid: Ariel's Beginning, The Tale of Despereaux, Dead Space: Downfall, Open Season 3, Yogi Bear, Rango, Hoodwinked Too! Hood vs. Evil, Hop, The Smurfs: A Christmas Carol, ParaNorman, The Lorax, Hotel Transylvania, Frozen, Despicable Me 2, Minions, Big Hero 6, The Star, The Boss Baby, The Lego Movie 2: The Second Part, Missing Link, Sonic the Hedgehog, The SpongeBob Movie: Sponge on the Run, Tom & Jerry, Love, Death & Robots and Paws of Fury: The Legend of Hank), dies at age 59.
  - Norihiro Inoue, Japanese actor (voice of Schneizel el Britannia in Code Geass, Taichi Hiraga Keaton in Master Keaton, Marco in Gunslinger Girl, Atlas in Metropolis), dies from colon infection at 63.

=== March ===
- March 1: Conrad Janis, American jazz trombonist and actor (voice of Frederick McConnell in Mork & Mindy/Laverne & Shirley/Fonz Hour), dies at age 94.
- March 2: Johnny Brown, American actor and singer (voice of Splashdown in Rickety Rocket), dies at age 84.
- March 4: Mitchell Ryan, American actor (voice of Highfather in the Justice League episode "Twilight"), dies from heart failure at age 88.
- March 7: Mia Ikumi, Japanese manga artist (Tokyo Mew Mew), dies from heart failure caused by subarachnoid hemorrhage at age 42.
- March 9: John Korty, American film director and animator (Sesame Street, The Electric Company, Twice Upon a Time, Vegetable Soup), dies at age 85.
- March 10: Emilio Delgado, Mexican-American actor (portrayed Luis in Sesame Street, voice of the King in The Bravest Knight, the Ram in the Between the Lions episode "The Ram in the Pepper Patch"), dies from multiple myeloma at age 81.
- March 13: William Hurt, American actor (voice of Jairus in The Miracle Maker, John Davis in The Legend of Sasquatch), dies from prostate cancer at age 71.
- March 14: Akira Takarada, Japanese actor (dub voice of Jafar in Aladdin, Ratigan in The Great Mouse Detective, Bendu in Star Wars Rebels), dies at age 87.
- March 22: Maxie Santillan Jr., American actor (portrayed Gummy the Pirate in The SpongeBob SquarePants Movie), dies at age 66.
- March 26: Violetta Kolesnikova, Russian animator (Soyuzmultfilm), dies at age 83.
- March 28: Carl Angus Bell, Canadian-American animator (Beany and Cecil, MGM Animation/Visual Arts, Filmation, Ruby-Spears Enterprises, The Lord of the Rings, Fire and Ice, The Charlie Brown and Snoopy Show, Walt Disney Animation Studios), dies from heart failure at age 91.

=== April ===
- April 2: Estelle Harris, American actress and comedian (voice of Mrs. Tammy Turtle in Mickey Mouse Works and House of Mouse, Mrs. Potato Head in the Toy Story franchise, Mrs. Catherina Duckstein in Queer Duck, Old Lady Bear in Brother Bear, Mrs. June Boogin in Teacher's Pet, Audrey in Home on the Range, Mama Lipsky in Kim Possible, Lula in Dave the Barbarian, Mama Gunda in Tarzan II, Oz's Mother in Fanboy & Chum Chum, Peg-Leg Peg in Jake and the Never Land Pirates, Velma Farnsworth in the Futurama episode "Near-Death Wish", Death's Mother in the Family Guy episode "Death Lives", Timon's Mother in the Timon & Pumbaa episode "Mombasa-In-Law", Lt. Kellaway's Mother in The Mask episode "The Mother of All Hoods", Arthur's Mother in The Tick episode "The Tick vs. Dot and Neil's Wedding", Phil's Mother in the Hercules episode "Hercules and the King for a Day", Iguana and Turtle in The Wild Thornberrys episode "Eliza-cology", Old Lady and Receptionist in the Godzilla: The Series episode "What Dreams May Come", Helga in The Proud Family episode "Thelma and Luis", Mrs. Irma Mudka in The Emperor's New School episode "Mudka's Secret Recipe", Marty's Wife in the American Dad! episode "In Country... Club", Sylvester's Mother in The Looney Tunes Show episode "Point, Laser Point"), dies at age 93.
- April 5: Nehemiah Persoff, American actor and painter (voice of Papa Mousekewitz in An American Tail), dies from heart failure at age 102.
- April 6: Jan Rogowski, British technical director and producer (co-founder of Red Star 3D), dies at age 41.
- April 7: Motoo Abiko, Japanese manga artist (Doraemon, Ninja Hattori-kun, Obake no Q-Tarō, The Monster Kid and The Laughing Salesman), dies at age 88.
- April 8: Minori Matsushima, Japanese actress (voice of Dororo in Dororo, Sayaka Yumi in Mazinger Z, Hiroshi Ichikawa in The Monster Kid, Candice White Adley in Candy Candy, Alexandria Meat in Kinnikuman, Tsuru in One Piece), dies from pancreatic cancer at age 81.
- April 12: Gilbert Gottfried, American actor and comedian (voice of Iago in the Aladdin franchise and House of Mouse, Digit and Widget in Cyberchase, Mr. Peabody in Problem Child, Mister Mxyzptlk in Superman: The Animated Series and Justice League Action, Berkeley Beetle in Thumbelina, Art DeSalvo in Duckman, Jerry the Bellybutton Elf / Adonis in The Ren & Stimpy Show, Kraang Subprime in Teenage Mutant Ninja Turtles, Mario Zucchini in Animal Crackers, Clion in the Hercules episode "Hercules and the Assassin", Santa Claus in The Grim Adventures of Billy & Mandy episode "Billy and Mandy Save Christmas", Rick Platypus in the My Gym Partner's a Monkey episode "That Darn Platypus", Mr. Greenway in Elf: Buddy's Musical Christmas, Genie in The Tom and Jerry Show episode "Meanie Genie", Sal in the SpongeBob SquarePants episode "The Hankering", Coal Miner in the Teen Titans Go! episode "Christmas Crusaders", God in the Smiling Friends episode "Charlie Dies and Doesn't Come Back", himself in Dr. Katz, Professional Therapist, Celebrity Deathmatch, and The Replacements episode "A Buzzwork Orange"), dies from ventricular tachycardia at age 67.
- April 15:
  - Liz Sheridan, American actress and dancer (voice of Mrs. Stillman in Life with Louie, Mrs. Rothberg in the American Dad! episode "An Apocalypse to Remember"), dies at age 93.
  - Vlasta Pospíšilová, Czech animator, screenwriter and director (Jiří Trnka Studio, Pat & Mat, Broučci, Fimfárum), dies at age 87.
- April 20: Robert Morse, American actor and singer (voice of young Stuffy in The First Easter Rabbit, young Scrooge in The Stingiest Man in Town, the title character in Jack Frost, Moncho in Monchhichis, Howler in Pound Puppies, Marshak and Gnuckles in Sofia the First, Santa Claus in Teen Titans Go! and Teen Titans Go! vs. Teen Titans, Goopy Gear in the Tiny Toon Adventures episode "Two-Tone Town", Dootch in the Aaahh!!! Real Monsters episode "Where Have All The Monsters Gone?", Mr. Koch in the Rugrats episode "Faire Play", DeSaad in the Superman: The Animated Series episode "Father's Day", Jake in The Wild Thornberrys episode "Two's Company", Old Phil in the Animals. episode "Flies."), dies at age 90.
- April 28: Neal Adams, American comic book artist (DC Comics) and writer (Bucky O'Hare and the Toad Wars), dies from complications of sepsis at age 80.
- April 30:
  - Ian Wilcox, American background artist (King of the Hill, Family Guy, The Simpsons), dies from cancer at age 66.
  - Evelyn Gabai, American color stylist (Jetlag Productions) and television writer (Fat Albert and the Cosby Kids, Saturday Supercade, Hanna-Barbera, Turbo Teen, Defenders of the Earth, Bionic Six, Jem, Alvin and the Chipmunks, Disney Television Animation, Where's Wally?, Beetlejuice, The Mask, Mega Man, Spider-Man, X-Men: Evolution, Jay Jay the Jet Plane, The Zula Patrol, Betsy's Kindergarten Adventures, The Penguins of Madagascar), dies at an unknown age.
- Specific date unknown: Norma Swank-Haviland, American ink and paint artist (The Three Caballeros) and actor (voice of Angry Woman in Crowd in Make Mine Music, Mice in Cinderella, second voice of Chip), dies at age 97.

=== May ===
- May 4: David Ott, American propmaker (The SpongeBob SquarePants Movie), dies at age 54.
- May 5: Mike Hagerty, American actor (voice of Cop #1 and Editor in the American Dad! episode "Not Particularly Desperate Housewife") dies at age 67.
- May 6: George Pérez, American comic book artist (DC Comics) and writer (voiced himself in the Teen Titans Go! episodes "Marv Wolfman & George Pérez" and "Creative Geniuses"), dies from pancreatic cancer at age 67.
- May 7: Robin Parkinson, English actor (narrated Button Moon), dies at age 92.
- May 8: Dennis Waterman, English actor and singer (voice of Toaster in Tube Mice, the title character in The Fiddley Foodle Bird), dies at age 74.
- May 18: Fernando Laverde, Colombian animator and film director (La pobre viejecita, Cristóbal Colón, Martín Fierro), dies at age 88.
- May 24: Burt Medall, American animator (Hanna-Barbera, The Grinch Grinches the Cat in the Hat, Filmation, Peanuts specials, Calico Entertainment, Garfield and Friends), sheet timer (Disney Television Animation, My Scene: Masquerade Madness, The Land Before Time, Warner Bros. Animation, Transformers: Prime, NFL Rush Zone, Hulk and the Agents of S.M.A.S.H.) and director (Mr. Bogus, Disney Television Animation), dies at age 76.
- May 26:
  - Ray Liotta, American actor and producer (voice of Zack in the Family Guy episode "Brian Does Hollywood", Bubble Poppin Boys Leader in the SpongeBob SquarePants episode "What Ever Happened to SpongeBob?", Morty Szyslak in The Simpsons episode "King Leer", himself in Bee Movie and the Phineas and Ferb episode "What A Croc!"), dies at age 67.
  - Dyfrig Wyn Evans, Welsh actor and musician (dub voice of Manetti in Angelo Rules, Big in Big & Small, Wise Old Elf in Ben and Holly's Little Kingdom, Snotlout in DreamWorks Dragons, Kowalski in The Penguins of Madagascar, Daddy Pig and Grampy Rabbit in Peppa Pig, Mr. McGregor, Mr. Bouncer, Dr. Bobtail and Old Brown in Peter Rabbit, Raphael in Teenage Mutant Ninja Turtles and Edward in Thomas & Friends), dies at age 43.
- May 28: Bo Hopkins, American actor (voice of Huttin in The Angry Beavers episode "Fat Chance"), dies from a heart attack at age 84.

=== June ===
- June 4: Jim White, American voice actor (voice of Haredas in One Piece, the Narrator and Igneel in Fairy Tail, Marco in Fairy Gone, Zeke's Grandpa in Attack on Titan), dies from lung cancer at age 73.
- June 5: Olga Orlova, Russian animator (Soyuzmultfilm, Angelina Ballerina), dies at age 89.
- June 8: Kousuke Takeuchi, Japanese voice actor (voice of Hikaru Amane in The Prince of Tennis, Shuun Kakei and Harao Kiminari in Eyeshield 21, Tesshin in Ginga Densetsu Weed, Dragon Ryu in Duel Masters Victory, Mitsuo Mishima in Between the Sky and Sea), dies at age 45.
- June 9:
  - Billy Kametz, American voice actor (voice of Josuke Higashikata in JoJo's Bizarre Adventure, Anai in Aggretsuko, Naofumi Iwatani in The Rising of the Shield Hero, Mikhail in Sirius the Jaeger, White Blood Cell in Cells at Work!, Ren and Ash's Rotom Phone in Pokémon Journeys: The Series, Shigeru Aoba in Neon Genesis Evangelion, Nevareth in The Owl House episode "Witches Before Wizards"), dies at age 35.
  - Matt Zimmerman, Canadian actor (voice of Alan Tracy and other various characters in Thunderbirds, Thunderbirds Are Go and Thunderbird 6), dies at age 87.
- June 11: Kumiko Takizawa, Japanese voice actress (voice of Grandis in Nadia: The Secret of Blue Water, Kate Hathaway and Lucina Pressette in Ginga Hyōryū Vifam, Shaya Thoov in The Super Dimension Century Orguss, Madoka Nagasaki in Miss Machiko, Panther Zora in New Cutie Honey, Naoko in Nabari no Ou, dub voice of Anabelle in All Dogs Go to Heaven), dies from a heart attack at age 69.
- June 12: Philip Baker Hall, American actor (voice of Mr. Thompson and Mr. Saunders in Baby Blues, Hank Hippopopalous in BoJack Horseman, Norman Walker in The Life & Times of Tim episode "Novelist"), dies at age 90.
- June 14: Everett Peck, American animator (creator of Duckman and Squirrel Boy), character designer (The Real Ghostbusters, The Critic, Adelaide Productions), art director (Sammy) and writer (Rugrats), dies from pancreatic cancer at age 71.
- June 15: Gordon Peters, English actor and comedian (voice of Characters of Mr. Men and Little Miss), dies at age 95.
- June 16: Ken Knowlton, American computer graphics pioneer, artist, mosaicist and portraitist (developed the BEFLIX programming language), dies at age 91.
- June 23:
  - Michiaki "Chumei" Watanabe, Japanese composer (Mazinger Z, Godannar, Getter Robo Go, Transformers: Victory), dies from heart failure at age 96.
  - Tommy Morgan, American harmonicist and session musician (Bugs Bunny's 3rd Movie: 1001 Rabbit Tales, Batman: The Animated Series, The Simpsons, Family Guy, Mickey's Once Upon a Christmas, Pixar, Shark Tale, Bambi II, Barnyard, Open Season, The Fox and the Hound 2), dies at age 89.
  - Steven Wilzbach, American animator (Warner Bros. Feature Animation), camera operator (DePatie-Freleng Enterprises, Filmation, Hanna-Barbera, The Prince and the Pauper, Rover Dangerfield, FernGully: The Last Rainforest, Tom and Jerry: The Movie, The Swan Princess), cinematographer (The Iron Giant) and producer (Eight Crazy Nights, The SpongeBob SquarePants Movie, Tutenstein), dies at age 69.
- June 27: Yuki Katsuragi, Japanese singer (performed an insert song in Space Dandy and the theme songs for Goku Midnight Eye and Gon, the Little Fox), dies from peritoneal cancer at age 73.

=== July ===
- July 2:
  - Mike Reynolds, American television writer (Robotech, Captain Harlock and the Queen of a Thousand Years, Macron 1, Digimon: Digital Monsters) and voice actor (voice of Matthew McCreep in The Smurfs and the Magic Flute, Billy Bones in The Treasure Planet, Dolza, Senator Russo, Zentraedi and other various characters in Robotech, Old Bearcat in Peter-No-Tail in Americat, Nezu in Akira, Hometown Adult #1 and Ket's Grandmother in Kiki's Delivery Service, Professor Fortier in Journey to the Heart of the World, various characters in the Power Rangers franchise, Van in Cowboy Bebop, Gennai in Digimon: Digital Monsters, Railspike in Transformers: Robots in Disguise, King of Ministoria in Bastard!!, Colonel in Cowboy Bebop: The Movie, Poseidon and Professor Kazumi in Cyborg 009, Lord Orkham in Wolf's Rain, Nibu, Ministry of Justice Official and Commissioner-General in Ghost in the Shell: Stand Alone Complex), dies at age 92.
  - Leonid Shvartsman, Russian animator and visual artist (Soyuzmultfilm), dies at age 101.
- July 4: Kazuki Takahashi, Japanese manga artist (creator of Yu-Gi-Oh!), drowns at age 60.
- July 5: Art Anthony, American make-up artist (The SpongeBob SquarePants Movie), dies at age 71.
- July 6: James Caan, American actor (voice of Tim Lockwood in Cloudy with a Chance of Meatballs and Cloudy with a Chance of Meatballs 2, the Bamboo Cutter in The Tale of the Princess Kaguya, himself in The Simpsons episode "All's Fair in Oven War", and the Family Guy episode "Something, Something, Something, Dark Side"), dies at age 82.
- July 8:
  - Larry Storch, American actor and comedian (voice of Cool Cat, Merlin the Magic Mouse, Second Banana and Colonel Rimfire in Looney Tunes, Koko the Clown in Out of the Inkwell, Phineas J. Whoopee in Tennessee Tuxedo and His Tales, The Joker in The Adventures of Batman and The New Scooby-Doo Movies, Drac, Hagatha, Ghoulihand, Batso, Ratso and Icky in Groovie Goolies, Mr. Mendelbaum and Herbert Finagle in Garfield and Friends), dies at age 99.
  - Tony Sirico, American actor (portrayed himself in the Family Guy episode "Stewie, Chris, & Brian's Excellent Adventure", voice of Vinny in Family Guy, Enzo Perotti in American Dad!, Big Daddy in The Fairly OddParents episodes "Talkin' Trash" and "Big Wanda"), dies at age 79.
  - Gregory Itzin, American actor (voice of Dick Tracy, William Adama and Police Officer in the Robot Chicken episode "Rabbits on a Roller Coaster"), dies at age 74.
  - Wendell Washer, American storyboard artist, animator (worked for Hanna-Barbera, Filmation, Warner Bros. Television Animation, Universal Animation Studios, Marvel Productions, Disney Television Animation) voice actor (voice of Chester P. Chieseler in Mighty Mouse: The New Adventures), character designer (The Puppy's Further Adventures, Blondie and Dagwood), writer (The Tom and Jerry Comedy Show) and comic artist, dies at age 75.
- July 9: Tony Mines, English animator, writer, director and producer (The Lego Group, co-founder of Spite Your Face Productions), dies at age 44.
- July 14: Jak Knight, American television writer, producer (Big Mouth), actor and comedian (voice of DeVon, Tall Guy and Gina's Brother #2 in Big Mouth, Stiles in American Dad!), commits suicide at age 28.
- July 18: Vincent DeRosa, American hornist (Mary Poppins, The Simpsons, Tom and Jerry: The Movie, Family Guy), dies at age 101.
- July 21: Taurean Blacque, American actor (voice of Roscoe in Oliver & Company), dies at age 82.
- July 22: Trixie Flynn, American production assistant (The Simpsons, The Critic), dies from respiratory failure at age 74.
- July 23:
  - Paul Coker Jr., American illustrator (Mad), character designer and production designer (Rankin/Bass Productions, Whatever Happened to... Robot Jones?), dies at age 93.
  - Jered Barclay, American actor (voice of Sinnertwin, Dr. Gregory Swofford, Wrist Timer and Cerebros in The Transformers, additional voices in Scooby-Doo and Scrappy-Doo, The Kwicky Koala Show, Trollkins, The Little Rascals, Richie Rich, The Dukes, Challenge of the GoBots, Pole Position, Foofur, The Smurfs and Paddington Bear), dies from MDS leukemia at age 91.
- July 24:
  - David Warner, English actor (voice of Ra's al Ghul in the DC Animated Universe, the Lobe in Freakazoid! and the Teen Titans Go! episode "Huggbees", the Master Control Program in Tron, Rob/Dr. Wrecker in The Amazing World of Gumball, Alpha in Men in Black: The Series, Victor Frankenstein in Toonsylvania, Lord Angstrom in Buzz Lightyear of Star Command, Nergal in Grim & Evil, Duke Richard of Lionsgate, Krasus, Sir Morgan and Maldon's Commander in The Legend of Prince Valiant, Herbert Landon and Red Skull in Spider-Man, Archmage in Gargoyles, Old Man and Oldsy in What's New, Scooby-Doo?, Talon in the Mighty Max episode "Souls of Talon", Zarm in the Captain Planet and the Planeteers episode "The Dream Machine", Ice Breaker in the Biker Mice from Mars episode "Below the Horizon", the Glyph in the Captain Simian & the Space Monkeys episode "Rhesus Pieces", Arthur Dearborn in the Iron Man episode "Cell of Iron", the Narrator in Pooh's Grand Adventure: The Search for Christopher Robin and A Valentine for You), dies from cancer at age 80.
  - Franco Zucca, Italian voice actor (dub voice of Mandarin in Iron Man, Manty in A Bug's Life, Fezziwig in Christmas Carol: The Movie, George Sanderson in Monsters, Inc., Monstar Bang in Space Jam, Jorgen Von Strangle in The Fairly OddParents, Zeke in Ice Age, Erik Hellstrom in Atlantis: The Lost Empire, Pachacamac in Sonic X, Lawrence in The Princess and the Frog, Furgus in Rango, Able in Tron: Uprising, Tom Jumbo-Grumbo in BoJack Horseman, Jerry Jumbeaux in Zootopia, Veterinarian in The Dragon Prince, Cat in Trollhunters: Tales of Arcadia, Joseph Roulin in Loving Vincent, Lord Piggot-Dunceby in Missing Link), dies at age 69.
- July 25: Paul Sorvino, American actor (voice of Alphonse Perrier du von Scheck in Hey Arnold!: The Movie, Variecom CEO in the Duckman episode "How to Suck in Business Without Really Trying"), dies at age 83.
- July 27: Bernard Cribbins, English actor and singer (portrayed Mr. Masterman in The Water Babies, voice of the Narrator in The Wombles, Christopher's Christmas Mission, Simon in the Land of Chalk Drawings and Edward and Friends, Eel in The Water Babies, Clint Katzenburger in the Dennis and Gnasher episode "Oil Strike!"), dies at age 93.
- July 28: Ron Zimmerman, American comic book writer, television producer and writer (Justice League Unlimited, The Simpsons), dies at age 64.
- July 30:
  - Nichelle Nichols, American actress, singer and dancer (voice of Nyota Uhura in Star Trek: The Animated Series, Diane Maza in Gargoyles, Miriam in Spider-Man, Thoth Khepera in the Batman: The Animated Series episode "Avatar", Chief in the Buzz Lightyear of Star Command episode "The Yukari Imprint", herself in the Futurama episodes "Anthology of Interest I" and "Where No Fan Has Gone Before", and The Simpsons episode "Simple Simpson"), dies from heart failure at age 89.
  - Pat Carroll, American actress and comedian (voice of Ursula in The Little Mermaid franchise, House of Mouse, and The Wonderful World of Mickey Mouse episode "Keep on Rollin'", Morgana in The Little Mermaid II: Return to the Sea, Ms. Biddy McBrain in Galaxy High School, Hazel in Foofur, Katrina Stoneheart in Pound Puppies, Grandma in A Garfield Christmas and Garfield's Thanksgiving, Granny in My Neighbor Totoro, Bacteria in Asterix and the Big Fight, Old Female Turtle in A Turtle's Tale: Sammy's Adventures, Old Lady Crowley in Rapunzel's Tangled Adventure, Hippolyta in the Superman episode "Superman and Wonder Woman vs. the Sorceress of Time", Paula P. Casso in A Pup Named Scooby-Doo episode "Dog Gone Scooby", Koo-Koo in the Chip 'n Dale: Rescue Rangers episode "Gorilla My Dreams", additional voices in The Super 6, Yogi's Treasure Hunt and A Goofy Movie), dies from pneumonia at age 95.
  - Kiyoshi Kobayashi, Japanese voice actor (voice of Daisuke Jigen in Lupin the Third, Bem in Humanoid Monster Bem, Adrian Rubinsky in Legend of the Galactic Heroes, Mohammed Avdol in JoJo's Bizarre Adventure (OVA), Watari in Death Note, VRV Master in Gekisou Sentai Carranger, the Narrator in episodes 1 to 39 of Kamen Rider Black and Uchuu Keiji Gavan: The Movie, dub voice of The Wolf in Droopy, Commander Norman in Thunderbirds, the title character in Shazzan, Splinter in Teenage Mutant Ninja Turtles, Roscoe in Oliver & Company, Jonah Hex in Batman: The Animated Series, Katscratch in SWAT Kats: The Radical Squadron, Forge in X-Men, Hernán Cortés in The Road to El Dorado, Jerry in Totally Spies!, Thief in Samurai Jack, Nava in Balto II: Wolf Quest, Rick Dicker in The Incredibles, Ice President in Adventure Time), dies from pneumonia at age 89.

=== August ===
- August 1: Hiroshi Ōtake, Japanese voice actor (voice of Koike in Obake no Q-Tarō, 004 in Cyborg 009, Sanpei in Speed Racer, Parman No. 2 in Perman, Boss in Mazinger Z, King Nikochan in Dr. Slump), dies from acute heart failure at age 90.
- August 2: Laurie Hanson, American animation checker (He-Man and the Masters of the Universe, BraveStarr, The Simpsons), dies at age 90.
- August 5: Clu Gulager, American actor and director (voice of Anderson's War Buddy in the Beavis and Butt-Head episode "What's the Deal?"), dies at age 93.
- August 6: Carlo Bonomi, Italian voice actor and clown (voice of the title character of La Linea, Paperazzi in Calimero, Red and Blue in The Red and the Blue, the title characters and other various characters in Stripy and Pingu), dies at age 85.
- August 7: Yoshifumi Ushima, Japanese singer-songwriter (performed an insert song in H2 and the theme songs of H2 and Mobile Fighter G Gundam), dies from chronic liver cirrhosis at age 55.
- August 9: Raymond Briggs, English illustrator, cartoonist, graphic novelist and author (The Snowman, When the Wind Blows, Father Christmas, The Bear, Ivor the Invisible, Fungus the Bogeyman, The Snowman and the Snowdog, Ethel & Ernest), dies from pneumonia at age 88.
- August 11: Anne Heche, American actress (voice of Gloria the Waitress in Higglytown Heroes, Lois Lane in Superman: Doomsday, Cherry Cream Soda in Adventure Time, Suyin Beifong in The Legend of Korra), dies from injuries from a car accident at age 53.
- August 13: Denise Dowse, American actress and director (voice of Officer Shirley in Rocket Power, Sheila Swann in the Rugrats episode "Tommy for Mayor"), dies from meningitis at age 64.
- August 17: Motomu Kiyokawa, Japanese voice actor (voice of Kozo Fuyutsuki in Neon Genesis Evangelion and Rebuild of Evangelion, Walter C. Dornez in Hellsing, Tem Ray in Mobile Suit Gundam, Tippy in Is the Order a Rabbit?, Artorius in Restaurant to Another World), dies from pneumonia at age 87.
- August 19: Dan Ferro, American actor (voice of T.J. Finger in the Bonkers episode "The Final Review", Gang Banger #1 and Goon #2 in the Gargoyles episode "For It May Come True"), dies at age 61.
- August 20: Maurice Kanbar, American producer (founder of Kanbar Entertainment for Hoodwinked! and Hoodwinked Too! Hood vs. Evil), dies at age 93.
- August 23: Gerald Potterton, English-Canadian animator (National Film Board of Canada, Yellow Submarine), storyboard artist (Rubik, the Amazing Cube), writer, producer (The Selfish Giant, The Happy Prince, The Christmas Messenger, George and the Christmas Star) and director (Cool McCool, Heavy Metal, CINAR, co-creator of The Smoggies), dies at age 91.
- August 25:
  - Jeffrey Leigh Howard, American animator (Walt Disney Animation Studios, An American Tail, BraveStarr, Happily Ever After, All Dogs Go to Heaven, Rover Dangerfield, Film Roman, Once Upon a Forest, The Pagemaster, Universal Cartoon Studios, Hyperion Pictures, The Swan Princess: Escape from Castle Mountain, The Swan Princess: The Mystery of the Enchanted Treasure, DreamWorks Animation, Disney Television Animation, The Powerpuff Girls Movie, Dora the Explorer, DisneyToon Studios, Curious George, The Smurfs: The Legend of Smurfy Hollow, Henry & Me), storyboard artist (Kid 'n Play), prop designer (Darkwing Duck) and sheet timer (Dora the Explorer, The Simpsons, King of the Hill), dies at age 69.
  - Shichirō Kobayashi, Japanese background artist (Toei Animation, Andersen Monogatari, Jungle Kurobe, Treasure Island, Phoenix 2772, The Fantastic Adventures of Unico, Rainbow Brite, Angel's Egg, The New Adventures of Winnie the Pooh, Simoun), storyboard artist (Urusei Yatsura, Here Is Greenwood, Simoun) and art director (TMS Entertainment, Tomorrow's Joe 2, The Wizard of Oz, Urusei Yatsura, Pierrot, Touch, The Littles, Angel's Egg, Venus Wars, Sohryuden: Legend of the Dragon Kings, Nurse Angel Ririka SOS, OLM, Inc., J.C.Staff, Basara, Otogi Zoshi, Simoun, Tokyo Marble Chocolate, Umi Monogatari), dies from heart failure at age 89.
- August 28: Ralph Eggleston, American animator (Family Dog, Garfield: His 9 Lives, Computer Warriors, FernGully: The Last Rainforest), storyboard artist (The Simpsons), art director (FernGully: The Last Rainforest, Walt Disney Animation Studios), production designer, writer and film director (Pixar), dies from colon infection at age 56.

=== September ===
- September 5: Sizzle Ohtaka, Japanese singer (performed an insert song in .hack//Legend of the Twilight and the theme songs for Hotarubi no Mori e and I'm Gonna Be An Angel!), dies at age 69.
- September 9: Vladimir Vyshegorodtsev, Russian animator (Soyuzmultfilm, Shakespeare: The Animated Tales, Varga Studio, Dobrinya and the Dragon), dies at age 72.
- September 12: Ryuji Mizuno, Japanese voice actor (voice of Giichi in Naruto, Meme Midgard in Turn A Gundam, B'T Radio in B't X, Master in Zombie Land Saga Revenge, Julius in Berserk), dies from sepsis at age 70.
- September 14: Henry Silva, American actor (voice of Bane in the DC Animated Universe), dies at age 95.
- September 15: Gil Alkabetz, Israeli animator, writer, producer and director (Bitz Butz, Swamp, Yankale, Rubicon, Travel to China, Trim Time, Morir de amor, Ein sonniger Tag, Wollmond, Der Da Vinci Timecode, 1 + 1, One Stormy Night, designed the animated scenes for Run Lola Run), commits suicide at age 64.
- September 16: Marva Hicks, American singer and actress (choir performer in The Brave Little Toaster Goes to Mars), dies at age 66.
- September 18: Marcello Magni, Italian actor (continued voice of the title character and other various characters in Pingu), dies at age 63.
- September 19: Amber Rudolph, American animator (VeggieTales, Blue Sky Studios, Pixar), dies at age 43.
- September 21: J. Garett Sheldrew, American animator (Æon Flux, KaBlam!), storyboard artist (Æon Flux, Todd McFarlane's Spawn, Hubert's Brain, Pixar), character designer (The Wish That Changed Christmas, FernGully 2: The Magical Rescue, Hubert's Brain), writer and director (Æon Flux), dies at age 57.
- September 23: Elena Prorokova, Russian animator, art director (Apples Make You Young, The Humpbacked Horse, Magician Bakhram's Heritage, The Last Petal, Butterfly and Tiger, Nazar the Brave, Shakespeare: The Animated Tales) and director (Bird Catcher, A Fairy-Tale About a Stupid Husband, From 9a.M. To 6p.M., The Way Out - A Steam of Consciousness), dies at age 74.
- September 25: Rita Gardner, American singer and actress (voice of Grandma Fox in the Dora the Explorer episode "Swiper's Favorite Things"), dies at age 87.
- September 26: Eugene Troubetzkoy, French-born American nuclear physicist, scientist and software supporter (Tron, co-founder of Blue Sky Studios), dies at age 91.
- September 28: Coolio, American rapper, record producer and actor (voice of Kwanzaabot in Futurama, Marvin Roper/Replikon in the Static Shock episode "Duped", Wax Coolio in the Gravity Falls episode "Headhunters", himself in the Duckman episode "Coolio Runnings"), dies from a heart attack at age 59.

=== October ===
- October 4: Loretta Lynn, American singer and songwriter (voice of Deli Porkchop in the Happily Ever After: Fairy Tales for Every Child episode "The Three Little Pigs"), dies at age 90.
- October 5: Shinsuke Chikaishi, Japanese voice actor (voice of Masuo Fuguta in Sazae-san, Pukko in The Amazing 3, Yoshihiko Hasegawa in Roujin Z, the Narrator in Gokū no Daibōken), dies from dementia at age 91.
- October 6: Judy Tenuta, American actress, comedian and musician (voice of Edna in Duckman, Black Widow in Space Ghost Coast to Coast, Mermaid, Waterskiing Babe, Black Widow and Waitress in Johnny Bravo, Tooth Fairy in the Nightmare Ned episode "Tooth or Consequences", Kelly in the Cow and Chicken episode "Buffalo Gals", Empanada in the Chowder episode "Mahjongg Night", Queen Porcina in the Mighty Magiswords episode "The Mystery of Loch Mess", herself in the Dr. Katz, Professional Therapist episode "Sticky Notes"), dies from ovarian cancer at age 72.
- October 7: Austin Stoker, Trinidadian-American actor (voice of Jeff Allen in Return to the Planet of the Apes, Poacher #2 in The Wild Thornberrys episode "The Trouble with Darwin"), dies from renal failure at age 92.
- October 9: Susan Tolsky, American actress (voice of Aunt Ruth in Bobby's World, Binkie Muddlefoot in Darkwing Duck, Aunt Janie in Pepper Ann, Mrs. Pesky in The Buzz on Maggie), dies at age 79.
- October 11:
  - Angela Lansbury, Irish-English-American actress and singer (portrayed Miss Eglantine Price in Bedknobs and Broomsticks and Balloon Lady in Mary Poppins Returns, voice of Sister Theresa in The First Christmas, Mommy Fortuna in The Last Unicorn, Mrs. Potts in the Beauty and the Beast franchise, Narrator/The Dowager Empress Marie in Anastasia, Grandmamma in Heidi 4 Paws, Mayor McGerkle in The Grinch), dies at age 96.
  - Peter Siragusa, American actor (voice of Bruton in Dinosaur, Rufus in Cloudy with a Chance of Meatballs, additional voices in Cloudy with a Chance of Meatballs 2, Home on the Range, and Mickey's Twice Upon a Christmas), dies at age 67.
- October 13: Mike Schank, American actor and musician (voiced himself in the Family Guy episode "Brian Sings and Swings"), dies from cancer at age 56.
- October 14:
  - Robbie Coltrane, Scottish actor and comedian (voice of Mr. Hyde in Van Helsing: The London Assignment, Gregory in The Tale of Despereaux, the title character in The Gruffalo and The Gruffalo's Child, Lead Elf in Arthur Christmas, Lord Dingwall in Brave), dies at age 72.
  - Jan Rabson, American actor (voice of Hooty and Professor Brighthead in G-Force: Guardians of Space, Tetsuo in Akira, Gordo Leiter, Jaws, Bilge, Reginald Farragut and other various characters in James Bond Jr., Kerma in Teenage Mutant Ninja Turtles, King Donogard in Skeleton Warriors, Jolt Volt and Top Hat in Creepy Crawlers, Axel in A Bug's Life, Midas and Nack in Barbie as the Princess and the Pauper, Principal Affleck in Bratz, Joe Lacky in Bratz: Pampered Petz, Zhu Fu in Quest for Zhu, Professor Quantum in Superbook, Mulia Mild and Wind Rider in My Little Pony: Friendship Is Magic, Avery in The Real Adventures of Jonny Quest episode "Alligators and Okeechobee Vikings", Professor Erlich in the Justice League episode "Paradise Lost", Steve Malone in the Rugrats episode "Early Retirement"), dies at age 68.
- October 16: Claudio Biern Boyd, Spanish television writer, director and producer (co-founder of BRB Internacional), dies at age 81.
- October 23: Michael Kopsa, Canadian actor (voice of Beast in X-Men: Evolution, Roger Baxter in Littlest Pet Shop, Char Aznable in Mobile Suit Gundam), dies at age 66.
- October 24: Leslie Jordan, American actor (voice of Beauregard LaFontaine in American Dad!, additional voices in Roadside Romeo and Glenn Martin, DDS), dies in a car crash at age 67.
- October 25: Jules Bass, American director, producer, composer, lyricist and author (co-founder of Rankin/Bass), dies at age 87.

=== November ===
- November 5: Aaron Carter, American singer and songwriter (voice of Joseph Plumb Martin in Liberty's Kids, Clutch Koerner in the Rocket Power episode "Legends and Their Falls"), dies at age 34.
- November 8: William Frederick Knight, American voice actor (voice of Daisuke Aramaki in Ghost in the Shell, Gordon Rosewater in The Big O, the Old Man in Paranoia Agent, Kuzemi in Eureka Seven, Danzo Shimura in Naruto Shippuden, Taishi in Tokko), dies at age 88.
- November 10: Kevin Conroy, American actor (voice of Batman in the DC Animated Universe, DC Universe Animated Original Movies, Batman: Strange Days, Justice League Action, the Teen Titans Go! episode "Real Orangins", and the Scooby-Doo and Guess Who? episode "What a Knight, for a Dark Knight", Phantom Stranger and Batman of Zur-En-Arrh in the Batman: The Brave and the Bold episodes "Chill of the Night!" and "The Batman from Outer Space!", Captain Sunshine in The Venture Bros. episodes "Handsome Ransom" and "Bot Seeks Bot", Prismal in Welcome to the Wayne, Mer-Man in the Masters of the Universe: Revelation episode "The Most Dangerous Man in Eternia", Hordak in the He-Man and the Masters of the Universe episode "The Beginning of the End, Part 2", Bellicus in the Ben 10: Alien Force episode "X = Ben + 2", John Grayson in The Batman episode "A Matter of Family"), dies at age 66.
- November 14: Kiyoyuki Yanada, Japanese voice actor (voice of Andromon in the Digimon franchise, Takenori Akagi in Slam Dunk, Kage-Maru in Virtua Fighter, Andre Camel in Case Closed) and animation director (Perfect Blue), dies at age 57.
- November 19:
  - Jonathan Gales, English animator and creative director (co-founder of Factory Fifteen), dies at age 36.
  - Jason David Frank, American actor and martial artist (voice of the Emissary in Transformers: Titans Return, Silver Bear in the We Bare Bears episode "Imaginary Friend"), dies at age 49.
- November 25: Irene Cara, American singer, songwriter and actress (voice of Snow White in Happily Ever After, Marilyn in The Magic Voyage), dies at age 63.
- November 30: George Newall, American writer, producer, and director (co-creator of Schoolhouse Rock!), dies at age 88.

=== December ===
- December 1: Thilo Kuther, German film producer (founder of VFX company Pixomondo), dies at age 58.
- December 6:
  - Ichirou Mizuki, Japanese singer, lyricist, composer and voice actor (voice acted, wrote and sang music for various anime films and TV series), dies at age 74 from lung cancer.
  - Mills Lane, American boxing referee (host of Celebrity Deathmatch), dies at age 85.
- December 9: Ruth Madoc, English actress (voice of Whale in the Tinga Tinga Tales episode "Why Whale Spouts"), dies at age 79.
- December 14: Han Peekel, Dutch comics scholar, singer and TV presenter (the comics and animated cartoons infotainment show Wordt Vervolgd), dies at age 75.
- December 15: Calpurnio, Spanish poster artist, animator, illustrator, veejay and comics artist (worked on an animated TV series of his signature comic series Cuttlas), dies at age 63.
- December 16: Chris Ledesma, American music editor (The Simpsons, The Critic, Annabelle's Wish, Mission Hill), dies at age 64.
- December 19: Andrei Svislotski, Russian animator and director (Curious George, Rugrats, Aaahh!!! Real Monsters, Sheriff Callie's Wild West, Duckman), dies at age 62.
- December 25: Yuji Nunokawa, Japanese film director (founder of Pierrot), dies at age 75.

== See also ==
- 2022 in anime
- List of animated television series of 2022
