= Action Pack =

Action Pack may refer to:

- Action Pack (TV programming block), a syndicated television programming block by Universal Television
- Action Pack, a component of Ruby on Rails
- Action Pack (TV series), a children's streaming series for Netflix
