= Happy the Hoglet =

British-Irish animated children's TV series

- Genre: Animated series
- Opening theme: Happy the Hoglet
- Countries of origin: United Kingdom; Ireland
- Original language: English
- No. of seasons: 1
- No. of episodes: 26

Production
- Running time: 7 minutes
- Production company: Paper Owl Films

Original release
- Network: RTÉjr
- Release: 14 November 2022 – present

Happy the Hoglet is a British-Irish 2D animated series produced by Paper Owl Films that premiered on RTÉjr on 14 November 2022.

== Characters ==
- Happy.
- Olivia.
- Cecil.
- Frankie.
- Mummy Flea.
- Duckling.

== Episodes ==
Series	Episodes	Originally released	
Series	Episodes	First released	Last released
1	26	14 November 2022	19 December 2022

=== Season 1 (2022) ===
No. overall	No. in series	Title	Original release date
1	1	Hangry Happy.	14 November 2022.
Happy the Hoglet is feeling hangry as he has got a rumbly tummy.
2	2	Happy Wiggle.	15 November 2022.
Happy discovers that you don't have to feel good by being good at something.
3	3	Happy Springtime.	16 November 2022.
Happy is feeling very snug inside but his friends want to play outside as it's a beautiful day.
4	4	Bee Happy.	17 November 2022.
Happy's feelings start growing big about Frankie meeting a bee in his garden.
5	5	So Embarrassing.	18 November 2022.
Happy feels really embarrassed when his friends find out his beloved baby snuggly which is his blankie.
6	6	Happy Our Year.	21 November 2022.
Happy is ecstatic to win the prize of the Best Tomatoes Ever.
7	7	Stormy Weather.	22 November 2022.
The clouds are making a growling and grumbling noise over Sunny River and it's making Happy very nervous.
8	8	Pass It On.	23 November 2022.
9	9	Happy Little Bird.	24 November 2022.
10	10	Happy Butterfly.	25 November 2022.
11	11	Happy Hogfairy.	28 November 2022.
12	12	Smelly Cat.	29 November 2022.
13	13	Happy All Alone.	30 November 2022.
14	14	Funny Face Feelings.	1 December 2022.
15	15	Very Great Things.	2 December 2022.
16	16	Not So Happy Help.	5 December 2022.
17	17	Happy Sailing.	6 December 2022.
18	18	Falling Trees.	7 December 2022.
19	19	Perfect Picnic.	8 December 2022.
20	20	Happy Feelings.	9 December 2022.
21	21	Quiet Time.	12 December 2022.
22	22	I'm Not Playing.	13 December 2022.
23	23	Don't Have Fun Without Me.	14 December 2022.
24	24	All Good Things.	15 December 2022.
25	25	Scary Things.	16 December 2022.
26	26	Happy Water Works.	19 December 2022.
