= Rosie's Rules =

Children's animated television series

- Genre: Preschool; Educational; Children's animation
- Created by: Jennifer Hamburg
- Developed by: Karen Fowler
- Directed by: Heejung Yun; Steve Daye; Paul Riley
- Starring: Ellora López; Ana Sofia Ferrer; Denise Oliver; Gabby Clarke; Oscar Whalen; Carlos Diaz; Amanda Martinez; Paloma Nuñez; Desmond Sivan
- Theme music composer: Chris Tait; Ari Posner
- Opening theme: "Rosie's Rules" performed by Chris Tait
- Ending theme: "Rosie's Rules" (instrumental)
- Composers: Ari Posner; Jorge Lopez
- Countries of origin: United States; Canada
- Original language: English
- No. of seasons: 2
- No. of episodes: 52 (103 segments) (list of episodes)

Production
- Executive producers: Jennifer Hamburg; Mariana Diaz-Wionczek; Karen Fowler; Vince Commisso; Natalie Osborne; Blake Tohana; Wendy Harris (season 1); Angela C. Santomero (season 1)
- Producers: Charley Thomas; Rebecca Lager
- Editors: Alejandro Tello; Jan Pácifer
- Production companies: 9 Story Media Group (Note: As Ruby Productions Inc. (season 1) and Ruby 2 Productions Inc. (season 2)); Brown Bag Films

Original release
- Network: PBS Kids (US); TVOKids (Canada)
- Release: October 3, 2022 – present

Rosie's Rules is a children's animated television series created by Jennifer Hamburg. The series premiered on October 3, 2022 on PBS Kids and October 11, 2022 on TVOKids. The series is produced by 9 Story Media Group and its animation division Brown Bag Films. It is funded by McCormick and animated using Toon Boom Harmony.

In 2024, it was announced that the series was renewed for a second season, which premiered on October 6, 2025. The second season was going to premiere in April 2025, but it was delayed to October of the same year.

== Premise ==
The series follows a 5-year-old girl named Rosie Fuentes, who investigates and learns about her hometown in San Antonio, Texas. Rosie lives in a multicultural environment, as her father is from Mexico City and her mother is from Wisconsin. She learns about her diverse community and the greater world with the support of her family, friends, and her pet cat, Gatita. The show is primarily in English, but incorporates Spanish words and phrases.

Every episode begins with a problem arising in Rosie's daily life, or her coming across a concept that she doesn't quite understand. This leads into Rosie singing the song "I Gotta Know", consisting of her (usually fantastical) interpretations of what she is wondering about. The song's lyrics are changed in each episode depending on the main subject. Over the course of an episode, Rosie will turn to the audience and come up with "rules," which are normally astute discoveries and happenings that she witnesses around her.

Every episode reaches its climax with Rosie feeling overwhelmed by the main conflict, either because of her efforts to solve it escalating the situation or she cannot handle it by herself. In an effort to relax, she declares she needs to "flop" and falls to the ground. She then talks herself through deep breaths and wiggles her body. Once Rosie is calmed down, she points her index finger upward and gets back up, stating "vamos a ver" (a Spanish phrase meaning "let's see").

At some point in every episode, Rosie calls her Abuela on a tablet, asking for help with the problem she is facing. Abuela will then give advice to Rosie or explain something further to her; this will give Rosie some insight on how her problem can be solved. Using what Abuela tells her and through help from her family and friends, Rosie either finds a solution or understands a new concept. This is followed by a short song about the episode's curriculum or moral; these are typically sung by Rosie, but will often include other characters. Beginning with the second season, these are replaced by a celebratory reprise of the song "I Gotta Know". At the end of each episode, Rosie states to the viewer the lesson she has learned in the form of her final "rule."

== Characters ==
=== Main ===
- Rosalía "Rosie" Fuentes (speaking voice by Ellora López and singing voice by Ana Sofía Ferrer) is the protagonist of the series; a young girl who makes various special "rules" that are included in each episode. She is the younger half-sister of Crystal and older sister of Iggy. She has a very sweet and playful disposition, and tends to create portmanteaus for certain words (ex. "wow-mazing"). Everyone generally likes Rosie and are willing to help her out. Rosie is Mexican-American, attributed to her father's side since her grandmother currently lives in Mexico. As such, she is bilingual in both English and Spanish, and frequently alternates between the two while speaking.
- Gatita (vocal effects provided by Denise Oliver) is the Fuentes' white-furred pet cat. She is Rosie's de-facto sidekick, joining in her games or activities. While mostly behaving like a regular cat, she usually expresses human-like emotions (and occasional anthropomorphism), and sometimes proves herself as being smarter than Rosie. In the episode "Gatita Day", it is revealed Gatita was a gift from Marco (a few years prior to the events of the series) to the rest of the family, but ran loose and climbed up a tree before he could reveal her. Rosie was the only one who knew how to get her down safely, encouraging her with a toy mouse.
- Ignácio "Iggy" Fuentes (voiced by Oscar Whalen) is Rosie's 2-year-old little brother. Due to his youth, he usually speaks in the third person and is prone to misunderstandings. Above all else, Iggy idolizes his older sister, Rosie (whom he affectionately calls "Wosie"), following her around as a ready and willing assistant, while also having a close relationship with Gatita. He has a stuffed pink axolotl named Lote.
- Crystal Fuentes (voiced by Gabby Clarke) is the 12-year-old half-sister of Rosie and Iggy Fuentes, and the stepdaughter of Marco Fuentes. She is the biological daughter of Liz from a previous relationship in Wisconsin, where Liz lived with her brother Steve. Crystal loves guiding Rosie, sometimes using her artistic talents to help Rosie out of a problem. She often likes to gloat about being the oldest of the Fuentes children, but is still fond of childish things such as balloon animals and merry-go-rounds. Crystal enjoys a wide range of hobbies, including art, ballet, ice skating, soccer, roller skating, and playing the tuba.
- Marco Fuentes/Papá (voiced by Carlos Díaz) is Rosie and Iggy's father, Abuela's son, Tìa's brother, Crystal's stepfather and Liz's husband who has a lighthearted, humorous disposition, most often cracking jokes or playing along with his children. Very proud of his Mexican heritage, Papá loves sharing stories of his upbringing in Mexico City.
- Elizabeth "Liz" Fuentes/Mom (voiced by Denise Oliver) is Rosie, Crystal and Iggy's mother and Marco's wife who has a younger brother named Steve. She is the biological mother of Crystal, whom she gave birth to prior to marrying Marco. She owns the town's bookstore, which the Fuentes children will sometimes visit. Liz also hosts the "Storytime with Mom" interstitials that appear in various episodes.
- Beatríz Gomez/Abuela (voiced by Amanda Martínez) is Rosie and Iggy's grandmother, Crystal's step-grandmother, Liz's mother-in-law and Marco and Margarita's mother who lives in Mexico City in the same house Papá and Tía grew up in. At some point in every episode, Rosie will make a video call to Abuela, where she'll ask her for help with whatever problem she is facing. She calls her grandkids "granito de arroz", which is a food-based nickname meaning "grain of rice". She is friends with Lili and Vero, two women she can occasionally be seen with during Rosie's calls.

=== Recurring ===
- Margarita Gomez/Tía (voiced by Paloma Nuñez (season 1) and Alex Castillo (season 2)) is Rosie and Iggy's aunt, Crystal's step aunt, Marco's sister, Liz's sister-in-law, Javi's mother, and Beatríz's daughter who owns a small Mexican fusion restaurant in town. She also serves as a soccer coach for Javi.
- Javier "Javi" Gomez (voiced by Desmond Sivan) is Rosie and Iggy's 6-year-old cousin and Crystal's half-cousin. Rosie frequently calls him "primo", and likewise, he responds by calling her "prima". He helps Rosie with her problem-solving escapades, and often lends a different, more sensical perspective on things. Like Rosie, he is a fan of The Purple Knight and Wonder Walrus.
- Jun Liu (voiced by Emma Ho) is an athletic, tomboyish 8-year-old girl who is Rosie's best friend who she often hangs out with. She also enjoys baking with her mother, as seen in "The Cake-Off". Jun is Chinese-American, as her grandparents are from Shanghai. She celebrates Chinese New Year alongside Quinn and the rest of the Liu family. They also have a pufferfish named Percy, as seen in the episode "Rosie's Pet-Tacular Business".
- Quinn Liu (voiced by Ian Ho (season 1) and Emma Ho (season 2)) is Jun's twin brother. Like his sister, he enjoys engaging in many kinds of sports and physical activities, including soccer, tennis, and swinging. He is also the mascot of Jun's soccer team, as revealed in "Rosie the Mascot", and shows an interest in theatre in "On With the Show".
- Grandpa Liu (voiced by Russell Yuen) is Jun and Quinn's grandfather.
- Steve (voiced by Scott Gorman) is Rosie, Crystal, and Iggy's uncle, Liz's younger brother and Marco's brother-in-law.
- Calvin (voiced by Joseph Motiki) is the baker in Rosie's town, running the local bakery. He holds other jobs throughout the series, such as volunteering at the community theater, hosting a cake decorating contest, and leading a disc-throwing competition. He has a puppy, Noodle.
- Dragon is Crystal's pet bunny who she adopts from the animal shelter.
- Maya (voiced by Saara Chaudry (season 1) and Ana Sani (season 2)) is the neighborhood's mail carrier who frequently visits Rosie and her family. In a few episodes, Maya mentions having nieces. The episode "The Mysterious Book" reveals Maya is of Indian descent and is fluent in Hindi.
- Benito (vocal effects provided by Carlos Díaz) is a pug and pet of Javi's family.
- Hazel (voiced by Stacey DePass) is a grocery store worker whom Rosie and Papá are familiar with.
- Purple Knight (voiced by Stephany Seki) is an in-universe, fictional female knight character idolized by Rosie and Javi. She usually shows up in themed events and merchandise, but sometimes will appear in-person.
- Wonder Walrus & Nando Narwhal (voiced by Carlos Díaz and Denise Oliver, respectively) are an in-universe fictional superhero duo that Rosie and Javi are fans of. They are usually seen on television, and their arch-nemesis is Sneaky Octopus.
- Dr. Mabel (voiced by Amanda Martínez) is Rosie and Iggy's doctor, seen in "Iggy's Check-Up".
- Yesenia (voiced by Amanda Martínez) is a famous Tex-Mex pop star who Rosie tries to emulate in "Pop Star Rosie".
- Vaquera Elisa (voiced by Alex Castillo)
- Mayor Bailey (voiced by Sabryn Rock)

== Episodes ==
=== Series overview ===
Season	Episodes	Originally released	
Season	Episodes	First released	Last released
1	40	October 3, 2022	June 27, 2024
2	25	October 6, 2025	TBA

=== Season 1 (2022–24) ===
No. overall	No. in season	Title	Directed by	Written by	Original release date	Prod. code
1	1	"Abuela's Birthday" "Cat Mail"	Heejung Yun, Steve Daye & Paul Riley	Jennifer Hamburg	October 3, 2022	101
When Rosie realizes her Abuela lives too far away to throw her a birthday party, Rosie tries to mail her a party in a box. When Abuela tells Rosie that she wants to see her and her family's pet white cat, Gatita, and to feel her fluff again, Rosie has an idea and accidentally sends the cat she loves in the mail to make it work. But this is a big problem and Rosie must save the cat from being shipped in the mail as her rule says: You can't mail a cat to Abuela. Interstitial: "Iggy's Train Station": Iggy is trying to make the train go but Gatita is in the way, so she has to move away from the train track and he needs to find another spot.
2	2	"Rosie the Dog Sitter" "Chef Rosie"	Heejung Yun & Steve Daye	Isabel Galupo Maria Escobedo	October 4, 2022	103
Rosie's aunt, Tia Margarita, comes for a visit and sends her dog, Benito to her house. And as a reminder, she has Rosie look after her dog for a while and she accepts it. But Rosie cannot make the dog to do anything. So will she help get Benito to do anything correctly or will she don't? This is one tough job for Rosie to handle. When Rosie discovers that her Tia's restaurant is closed for refurbishments, she feels sad. She then opens a restaurant in the kitchen at her home to cheer her and her family up. As Chef Rosie, she's also making delicious tostadas for them to enjoy with help from her little brother, Iggy who becomes her assistant chef. But will her restaurant become a success and will everybody enjoy her tostadas? Interstitial: "Rosie's Rolly Carnival Game": Rosie plays with Iggy called "Rosie's Rolly Carnival Game".
3	3	"Sister Surprise" "Rosie's Twin Day!"	Heejung Yun & Paul Riley	Nick Rodriguez Leslie Valdes	October 5, 2022	111
Sister Surprise: Rosie learns that today is the day dedicated to sisters. She tries to throw a perfect sister surprise for her and also her big sister, Crystal, and her aunt, Tia, but is uncertain who the special sister surprise is for. Rosie's Twin Day!: Rosie learns that she doesn't have a twin when she sees her friends Jun and Quinn being twins. She tries to have someone to twin with her, attempting to do so with her two siblings Iggy and Crystal and her cousin Javi. Eventually she learns that she doesn't need a twin to do everything with her because she already has people to do things with. Interstitial: "Goldilocks and the Three Bears": Mom is reading "Goldilocks and the Three Bears".
4	4	"Movie Night" "Rosie's Seashell Museum"	Heejung Yun & Paul Riley	Adam Beechen Michael Olmo	October 6, 2022	109
Movie Night: Rosie wants to trade Javi's popcorn for the family movie night. Rosie's Seashell Museum: The Fuentes family goes to the beach today, and Rosie is gathering a seashell collection but Crystal finds a beautiful purple seashell. Interstitial: "Soccer with Javi": Rosie and Javi are playing soccer together.
5	5	"Family Sports Day" "The Cake-Off"	Heejung Yun & Steve Daye	Becky Friedman Halcyon Person	October 10, 2022	102
Family Sports Day: The Fuentes Family has a hard time deciding which sport to play, so they hold a vote. The Cake Off: Rosie and Papa Enter the Cake-Off, but when there's a tie, Rosie realizes that they can vote again. Interstitial: "Going To the Lake": Rosie and her family are going to the lake.
6	6	"Rosie Rocks Mariachi" "Rosie Canta un Corrido"	Heejung Yun & Steve Daye	Vivien Mejia Maria Escobedo	October 11, 2022	105
Rosie Rocks Mariachi: When the mariachis can't come today, Rosie fills in for Tia and Papa. Rosie Canta un Corrido: Rosie tries to make a corrido for the family talent show. Interstitial: "Benito At the Lake": Javi's pet, Benito, is on a lake.
7	7	"Rosie Maps it Out" "Merry-Go-Rosie"	Heejung Yun & Steve Daye	Guy Toubes Jennifer Hamburg	October 12, 2022	104
Rosie Maps it Out: Mom takes the kids out for Mother's Day. Merry-Go-Rosie: Rosie makes a route to go to the Merry-Go-Round with Crystal and Javi. Interstitial (repeat from episode 3): "Goldilocks and the Three Bears": Mom is reading "Goldilocks and the Three Bears".
8	8	"Iggy's Bedtime" "The Great Crystalini"	Heejung Yun & Paul Riley	Maria Escobedo & Scott Gray Kevin Del Aguila	October 13, 2022	114
Iggy's Bedtime: Rosie tries to do a routine for Iggy to go to bed. The Great Crystalini: Rosie tries to do the trick in order with The Great Crystalini. Interstitial (repeat from episode 1): "Iggy's Train Station": Iggy tries to make the train go but Gatita is in the way, so she has to get off of the train track and he needs to find another spot.
9	9	"Lights Out, Rosie!" "Rosie Goes Camping"	Heejung Yun & Paul Riley	Jennifer Keene Maria Escobedo	October 17, 2022	110
Lights Out Rosie: When the lights and devices are turned off, Rosie and Javi try to be back in the old days without electricity. Rosie Goes Camping: When the whole family forgets the tools, Rosie uses things from nature. Interstitial (repeat from episode 5): "Going To the Lake": Rosie and her family are going to the lake.
10	10	"Mom's Snowy Day" "Rosie's Nature Adventure"	Heejung Yun & Paul Riley	Adam Beechen Michael Olmo	October 18, 2022	112
Mom's Snowy Day: Rosie and Javi try to make a snowy day for Mom. Rosie's Nature Adventure: When Rosie, Iggy, and Papa are at a national park, Lote falls in the river after they discover water. Interstitial (repeat from episode 6): "Benito At the Lake": Javi's pet, Benito, is on a lake.
11	11	"Fun House" "Crystal's New Bunny"	Heejung Yun & Paul Riley	Manny Nieto Jr. Jennifer Keene	October 24, 2022	113
Fun House: Rosie finally dares to go in the Fun House but only has two tickets. Crystal's New Bunny: Rosie and Crystal find what they want for Crystal's bunny. Interstitial (repeat from episode 2): "Rosie's Rolly Carnival Game: Rosie plays with Iggy called "Rosie's Rolly Carnival Game ".
12	12	"Super Rosie" "On with the Show"	Heejung Yun, Paul Riley & Steve Daye	Jennifer Hamburg Nick "Rocket" Rodriguez	October 25, 2022	115
Super Rosie: Rosie turns into a Super Kid for her nighttime job. On with the Show: Rosie must find her job before the show starts. Interstitial (repeat from episode 4): "Soccer with Javi": Rosie and Javi are playing soccer together.
13	13	"Dino Day Delayed" "Rosie's Walkie Talkie"	Heejung Yun & Steve Daye	Alonso Cisneros Mercedes Valle	January 30, 2023	106
Dino Day Delayed: When Papa says that they'll have to wait till tomorrow, Rosie tries to make tomorrow come faster. Rosie's Walkie Talkie: Rosie finds walkie-talkies with Javi to play I-Spy with Jun. Interstitial: "Javi the Brave": Javi pretends to be Javi the Brave.
14	14	"Royal Rosie" "Rosie's No-Strawberry Stand"	Heejung Yun & Steve Daye	Alonso Cisneros Ligiah Villalobos	January 31, 2023	107
Royal Rosie: Rosie tries to set up Mom's bookstore with Iggy and Javi, but she isn't sure how to help her set up. Rosie's No Strawberry Stand: It's hot outside, and Rosie and Javi run out of strawberries, so they learn how stores receive food. Interstitial: "Bigotes": Abuela is taking care of Bigotes, Vero's cat.
15	15	"Rosie Gets Moving" "The Flying Disc Dilemma"	Heejung Yun & Steve Daye	Manny Nieto Jr. Jessica Lopez	February 1, 2023	108
Rosie Gets Moving: Rosie, Javi, and Papa try to deliver Tia's Lucky spoon before her train leaves. The Flying Disc Dilemma: Crystal's Disc becomes stuck in a tree, so Rosie and Javi must get it down. Interstitial: "Trying the Tostadas": Papa tries to teach the family how to eat tostadas, but it turns out he's the only one who hasn't quite mastered it.
16	16	"Trouble in Chalk Town" "Storytime Garden"	Heejung Yun & Paul Riley	Jesenia Ruiz Shelley Acosta Smith	February 2, 2023	116
Trouble in Chalk Town: Rosie and Javi make a Chalk Town, but the others want to use it, too. Storytime Garden: The storytime garden looks messy, so Rosie cleans it up before storytime starts. Interstitial: "Family Photo": Rosie and her family try to take their photo.
17	17	"Rosie's Pirate Adventure" "Time Trouble"	Heejung Yun & Paul Riley	Becky Friedman & Marty Jacobson Leyani Diaz	April 3, 2023	117
Rosie's Pirate Adventure: Rosie, Javi, and Iggy go around the world, but first they need to find a route. Time Trouble: While Jun is still in Shanghai, Jun, and Rosie plan a virtual breakfast, but when it's daytime for Rosie, it's nighttime for Jun. Interstitial: Lote's Bath: Iggy and Papa are helping Lote prepare for his bath, but Iggy is trying to have a Lote's friend.
18	18	"The Doggie Detectives" "A House for Gatita"	Heejung Yun & Paul Riley	Alyson Piekarsky Zoila Caleano	April 4, 2023	118
The Doggie Detectives: Rosie, Mom, and Crystal try to find which dog lost its hot dog toy. A House for Gatita: Rosie and Javi build a house for Gatita to sleep in. Interstitial: The Three Little Pigs: Mom is reading "The Three Little Pigs."
19	19	"An Anniversary Tradition" "Chiles en Nogada Day"	Heejung Yun	Becky Friedman Jessenia Ruiz	April 5, 2023	119
An Anniversary Tradition: Rosie, Crystal, and Iggy try to remake Mom and Papa's anniversary tradition at home. Chiles en Nogada Day: When Papa forgets the recipe, Rosie helps the family find it to make Chiles en Nogada. Interstitial: "Marachi": Iggy wants to play marachi with Gatita.
20	20	"Dragon Drama" "Rosie's Lucky Charm"	Heejung Yun	Shelley Acosta Smith Alyson Piekarsky	June 26, 2023	120
Dragon Drama: Rosie and Javi prepare for the arrival of a dragon. Rosie's Lucky Charm: Rosie finds a lucky charm in the backyard. Interstitial: (repeat from episode 13): "Javi the Brave": Javi pretends to be Javi the Brave.
21	21	"Rosie in the City" "Rosie in the Country"	Heejung Yun	Ligiah Villalobos Jeannette Lara	June 27, 2023	121
Rosie in the City: Rosie, Javi, and Papa go on an adventure in the city to find Javi's dragon Chispa. Rosie in the Country: Rosie, Tia, Javi, and Iggy look for bluebonnets in the country, but they encounter obstacles along the way. Interstitial (repeat from episode 14): "Bigotes": Abuela is taking care of Bigotes, Vero's cat.
22	22	"The Great Robot Picnic" "Rosie's Car Wash"	Heejung Yun	Michael J. Beall Jennifer Hamburg	June 28, 2023	122
The Great Robot Picnic: Rosie and Javi repurpose items for the robot picnic. Rosie's Car Wash!: Rosie opens a car wash using water from the bucket, but she and Javi don't have water, and there are too many customers. Interstitial (repeat from episode 15): "Trying the Tostadas": Papa tries to teach the family how to eat tostadas, but it turns out he's the only one who hasn't quite mastered it.
23	23	"Fort Fuentes" "Rosie's Derby Car!"	Heejung Yun	Jesenia Ruiz Maria Escobedo	June 29, 2023	123
Fort Fuentes: Rosie, Crystal, and Iggy make a fort, but they can't fit everything they want. Rosie's Derby Car: Rosie and Javi make a derby car for the race, but every time Javi tells Rosie his idea, Rosie has trouble listening to him. Interstitial (repeat from episode 16): "Family Photo": Rosie and her family try to take their photo.
24	24	"The Ice Pop Truck" "Rosie's Dollar Dilemma"	Heejung Yun	Nick Rodriguez Jesenia Ruiz	August 21, 2023	124
The Ice Pop Truck: Rosie must come up with an extra dollar to buy the ice pop. Rosie's Dollar Dilemma: Rosie has trouble figuring out what to buy at the Mercado. Interstitial (repeat from episode 17): "Lote's Bath": Iggy and Papa are helping Lote prepare for his bath, but Iggy is trying to get Lote a friend.
25	25	"Rosie the Message Delivery Kid" "Javi's Growl"	Heejung Yun	Ernie Bustamante Jesenia Ruiz	August 22, 2023	125
Rosie the Message Delivery Kid: Rosie is a delivery kid for the day, but she mixes up the messages. Javi's Growl: When Javi loses his voice, Rosie helps him recover before the play begins. Interstitial (repeat from episode 18): The Three Little Pigs: Mom reads "The Three Little Pigs."
26	26	"President of the Sandbox" "Dino Parade"	Heejung Yun	Jennifer Hamburg Jesenia Ruiz	August 23, 2023	127
President of the Sandbox: Rosie and Javi both want to be in charge of the sandbox, so the kids hold an election to see who wants to be president. Dino Parade: When the dino parade might be canceled, Rosie calls her friends to be in the dino band with her. Interstitial (repeat from episode 19): "Marachi": Iggy wants to play marachi with Gatita.
27	27	"Neighborhood Market Day" "Rosie and Javi's Slime Store"	Heejung Yun	Becky Friedman Shelley Acosta Smith	August 24, 2023	128
Neighborhood Market Day: Rosie tries to find the perfect good for Neighborhood Market Day. Rosie and Javi's Slime Store: Rosie and Javi open a slime store to sell slime to customers. Interstitial: "Inspiration": It involves Crystal teaching Iggy how to paint.
28	28	"Rosie on Ice" "The Meteor Shower"	Heejung Yun	Alonso Cisneros Jesenia Ruiz	August 25, 2023	129
Rosie on Ice: Rosie goes skating with the Purple Knight, but she feels a little cold. The Meteor Shower: Rosie, Javi, Crystal, Mom, Iggy, and Papa go to see the meteor shower outside. Interstitial: "Rosie Flower": Rosie pretends to be a flower for Iggy.
29	29	"Dance Party Island" "Rosie the Mascot"	Heejung Yun	Maria Escobedo Marty Jacobson	September 27, 2023	130
Dance Party Island: Rosie and Iggy make an island, but the flag they put up causes confusion. Rosie the Mascot: Rosie tries to be the mascot for Javi's team. Interstitial: "Catch the Mouse": Gatita tries to catch her mouse.
30	30	"Purple Sweet Potato Buns" "Tia's Big Break"	Heejung Yun	Jennifer Keene Vivien Mejia	September 28, 2023	131
Purple Sweet Potato Buns: Rosie, Jun, and Grandpa Liu go to the Asian Market to buy Purple Sweet Potato Buns. Tia's Big Break: Rosie helps Tia overcome her fear of being on a TV show. Interstitial: "Huipil": Abuela doesn't know what huipil looks like.
31	31	"Rosie's Switcheroo" "Rosie's Family Tree"	Heejung Yun	Maria Escobedo Don Perez	September 29, 2023	132
Rosie's Switcheroo: Rosie and Papa switch jobs for the day, but it's tricker than they thought. Rosie's Family Tree: Rosie makes a family tree for the Fuentes Family. Interstitial: "Forgetting something to Hike": Abuela forgets something to hike.
32	32	"The Catrina Mystery" "The Lucky Dragon Dance"	Heejung Yun	Diego Ignacio López García Joon Chung	October 23, 2023	136
The Catrina Mystery: During the celebration of the Day of the Dead, Rosie is in charge of the Catrina Doll, but it's a mystery when Rosie and Javi search in charge of his disappearing Catrina doll. The Lucky Dragon Dance: Rosie celebrates Lunar New Year with the Liu family, so Jun and Quinn join our dragon dance and make their own. Interstitial (repeat from episode 28): "Rosie Flower": Rosie pretends to be a flower for Iggy.
33	33	"Donating Day" "Gatita the Volunteer Cat"	Heejung Yun	Jesenia Ruiz Jennifer Hamburg	November 20, 2023	133
Donating Day: Rosie accidentally donates her doll Lele on Donating Day, so she and her family try to recover her before she is donated. Gatita the Volunteer Cat: Rosie and Gatita volunteer at the Nature Center, but every time Rosie tells Gatita to do her trick, Gatita sleeps. Interstitial: "The Princess and the Pea": Mom reads "The Princess and the Pea".
34	34	"Rosie the Reporter" "The Jalapeño Giant"	Heejung Yun	Alyson Piekarsky Jesenia Ruiz	November 21, 2023	134
Rosie the Reporter: Rosie is a reporter for the day, but she has trouble looking for newsworthy things. The Jalapeño Giant: Rosie and Jun worry there is a jalapeno giant on the loose. Interstitial: "Rolling Cat": It shows Iggy teaching Gatita how to roll.
35	35	"Catch That Watermelon" "Dino Cave"	Heejung Yun	Edlin Ortiz Maria Escobedo	November 22, 2023	135
Catch That Watermelon: Rosie and Javi carry a watermelon to the park for the family picnic. Dino Cave: Rosie builds a dino cave for Iggy. Interstitial (repeat from episode 27): "Inspiration": It involves Crystal teaching Iggy how to paint.
36	36	"Rosie's Christmas in Mexico"	Heejung Yun	Maria Escobedo & Jesenia Ruiz	December 11, 2023	126
Rosie's Christmas in Mexico: Rosie is so excited to celebrate Christmas with Abuela that she forgets to bring her present. Now she must find another one before Noche Buena. Interstitial (repeat from episode 34): "Rolling Cat": It shows Iggy teaching Gatita how to roll.
37	37	"Abuela's Song" "Rosie the Inventor"	Heejung Yun	Jesenia Ruiz Shelley Acosta Smith	June 24, 2024	137
Abuela's Song: Rosie and Javi want to play Abuela's song for Music Night at Tia's Restaurant. Rosie the Inventor: Rosie wants to be an inventor. Interstitial (repeat from episode 29): "Catch the Mouse": Gatita tries to catch her mouse.
38	38	"Rosie the Recycling Kid" "Rosie and la Monarca"	Heejung Yun	Alyson Piekarsky Nick "Rocket" Rodriguez	June 25, 2024	138
Rosie the Recycling Kid: It's Recycling Day, so Rosie becomes a recycling kid, but she accidentally recycles Crystal's art project. Rosie and la Monarca: When Rosie and Javi find a monarch butterfly in the backyard, they try to figure out what it needs so it can flutter again. Interstitial (repeat from episode 30): "Huipil": Abuela doesn't know what huipil looks like.
39	39	"Wonder Walrus Live" "Rosie & Javi's Museum"	Heejung Yun	Jesenia Ruiz Jennifer Hamburg	June 26, 2024	139
Wonder Walrus Live: Uncle Steve takes the kids to the park where a Wonder Walrus show is about to start. Rosie & Javi's Museum: Rosie & Javi make a space museum at home. Interstitial (repeat from episode 31): "Forgetting something to Hike": Abuela forgets something to hike.
40	40	"Rosie Makes the Rules" "Iggy's Dino Cake"	Heejung Yun	Jennifer Hamburg Maria Escobedo	June 27, 2024	140
Rosie Makes the Rules: Abuela gives the Fuentes Family a hammock, but the kids must set up rules to keep things fair. Iggy's Dino Cake: Tia baked Iggy a dino cake for his birthday, but Rosie and Javi break her rule of not touching the cake, and now it's smushed and it's broken. Interstitial (repeat from episode 33): "The Princess and the Pea": Mom reads "The Princess and the Pea".

=== Season 2 (2025–26) ===
No. overall	No. in season	Title	Directed by	Written by	Original release date	Prod. code
41	1	"Iggy's Check-Up" "The New Park"	Heejung Yun	Jesenia Ruiz Jennifer Hamburg	October 6, 2025	201
Iggy's Check-Up: Rosie helps Iggy get ready for his appointment with Dr. Mabel. Interstitial (repeat from episode 1): "Iggy's Train Station": Iggy tries to make the train go but Gatita is in the way, so she has to get off of the train track and he needs to find another spot. The New Park: Rosie wants to play in the new park, but everything seems too small for her, and she decides to figure out who the park is intended for.
42	2	"The Mysterious Book" "Rosie's New Club"	Heejung Yun	Diego Ignacio López García Becky Friedman	October 7, 2025	203
The Mysterious Book: Rosie and Javi get a new book, but it's in a different language. Interstitial (repeat from episode 3): "Goldilocks and the Three Bears": Mom is reading "Goldilocks and the Three Bears". Rosie's New Club: Rosie tries to form a club with her friends.
43	3	"Garbage Day" "Crystal's Sneezy Day"	Heejung Yun	Jehan Madhani Isabel Galupo	October 8, 2025	202
Garbage Day: Iggy wants to see the garbage truck, but Rosie doesn't know how to get it to come by their house. Interstitial (repeat from episode 28): "Rosie Flower": Rosie pretends to be a flower for Iggy. Crystal's Sneezy Day: Crystal can't be around nature as often as she likes due to a pollen allergy, so Rosie attempts to bring nature to her for her painting.
44	4	"The Great Cupcake Search" "Iggy's Egg Hunt"	Heejung Yun	Shelley Acosta Smith Benjamin Weiner	October 9, 2025	204
The Great Cupcake Search: Rosie, Javi and Uncle Steve use landmarks to get to Calvin's bakery. Interstitial (repeat from episode 17): "Lote's Bath": Iggy and Papa are helping Lote prepare for his bath, but Iggy is trying to have Lote's friend. Iggy's Egg Hunt: Rosie, Iggy, and Javi go on an Easter egg hunt.
45	5	"Lights, Camera, Rosie!" "Gatita Day"	Heejung Yun	Nick "Rocket" Rodriguez Jennifer Hamburg	October 10, 2025	205
Lights, Camera, Rosie!: Rosie, Iggy, and Crystal make a movie together. Interstitial (repeat from episode 16): "Family Photo": Rosie and her family try to take their photo. Gatita Day: Rosie's mother happens across a photo from the day Gatita came into the family.
46	6	"Pop Star Rosie" "Rosie's Tooth"	Heejung Yun	Jensena Ruiz Diego Ignacio López García	May 11, 2026	206
Pop Star Rosie: When Tía can't get tickets to see her favorite singer, Rosie decides to put on a concert of her own. Interstitial (repeat from episode 19): "Marachi": Iggy wants to play marachi with Gatita. Rosie's Tooth: Rosie lost her first tooth, but she doesn't know who will visit, the Tooth Fairy or the Tooth Mouse. So, she prepares to welcome both.
47	7	"Rosie's Pet-Tacular Business" "Javi's Rock"	Heejung Yun	Shelly Acosta Smith Nick Rocket Rodriguez	May 12, 2026	207
Rosie's Pet-Tacular Business: Rosie starts a pet-sitting business, but things soon get out of control - until Crystal steps in to help. Interstitial (repeat from episode 6): "Benito At the Lake": Javi's pet, Benito, is on a lake. Javi's Rock: Rosie plays with a rock from Javi's rock collection, but to her surprise, he asks for it back, and she doesn't know where it is!
48	8	"Rosie's Pirate Rules" "Rosie's Fun Club Job"	Heejung Yun	Becky Friedman Benjamin Weiner	May 13, 2026	208
Rosie's Pirate Rules: Rosie and Javi are ready for a pirate adventure, but wherever they go has rules that keep them from playing how they want. Interstitial (repeat from episode 4): "Soccer with Javi": Rosie and Javi are playing soccer together. Rosie's Fun Club Job: At their first Fun Club meeting, each member picks a job, but Rosie doesn't know what her job should be.
49	9	"Rosie Goes to the Rodeo" "The Tamales Contest"	Heejung Yun	Jehan Madhani Jesenia Ruiz	September 14, 2026	209
Rosie Goes to the Rodeo: Rosie enters a cowgirl contest at a local rodeo. The Tamales Contest: Papá and Tía compete to see who makes the best tamales in the family.
50	10	"Rosie The Mayor" "All Eyes On Rosie"	Heejung Yun	Jennifer Hamburg Alyson Piekarsky	September 15, 2026	210
51	11	"Crystal's Doggy Wash" "The Costume Quest"	Heejung Yun	Isabel Galupo Diego Ignacio López García	September 16, 2026	211
52	12	"The Legend of Captain Spooky Beard" "Crystal's Haunted House"	Heejung Yun	Shelly Acosta Smith Jennifer Hamburg	October 19, 2026	219

== Broadcast ==
The series began airing on October 3, 2022 on PBS Kids in the United States. In Canada, the show began airing on TVOKids on October 11, 2022.

In other countries, the series began airing on e-Junior in United Arab Emirates on September 4, 2023. The series has also aired on Knowledge Network in Canada and ViuTVsix in Hong Kong.

== Awards ==
Year	Award	Category	Nominee(s)	Result	Ref.
2023	YMA Awards of Excellence	Best Program (Animation)	"Rosie's Twin Day"	Nominated	
2023	BANFF Rockie Awards	Interactive Children and Youth Content	Rosie's Rules: Slime Store	Nominated	
2023	Nova Star Awards	Voice-over Animation (Age 8-9)	Ellora Lopez	Nominated	
2024	Annie Awards	Best Writing (TV/Media)	Jennifer Hamburg, Maria Escobedo and Leyani Diaz (for "Time Trouble")	Nominated	
2025	Children's and Family Emmy Awards	Outstanding Preschool Animated Series	Rosie's Rules	Nominated	
2026	Imagen Awards	Best Youth Programming	Rosie's Rules	Won	

== Related media ==
=== Games ===
These games were released on the PBS Kids website, as well as the PBS Kids Games App.

1. Riding With Rosie
2. Slime Store
3. Rosie Care
4. Rosie's Flop Fiesta
5. Robot Planter Maker
6. Guess Gatita
7. Rosie Travels
