= Hello Kitty: Super Style! =

- Genre: Comedy
- Based on: Hello Kitty by Sanrio
- Directed by: Jérémy Guiter
- Voices of: Sarah Anne Williams; Cenophia Mitchell; Kaycie Chase; Lindsay Sheppard; Kaylin Lee Clinton; Kara Edwards; Nicholas Andrew Louie; Gary Mack
- Opening theme: "Hello Kitty Super Style Theme" by Carly Rae Jepsen
- Countries of origin: Italy; France
- Original languages: English; French; Italian
- No. of seasons: 12
- No. of episodes: 52

Production
- Executive producers: Philippe Alessandri; Massimo Carrier Ragazzi; Giorgio Welter
- Running time: 11 minutes
- Production companies: Watch Next Media; Monello Productions; Maga Animation Studio; Nixten Productions

Original release
- Network: Amazon Prime Video (USA, UK, Germany, and Canada); Canal+ Kids (France); Rai Yoyo (Italy)
- Release: 7 December 2022 – 4 April 2024

Hello Kitty: Super Style! is a 3D animated television series based on the Hello Kitty character by Sanrio. The series premiered on Amazon Prime Video on 7 December 2022.

Although its age rating is +0, in some episodes such as "A Star Is Built", HBO Max rates it as +7.

== Plot ==
The television series follows Hello Kitty as she helps the inhabitants of Cherry Town with their problems. In this series, her trademark bow allows her to transform to multiple forms such as a chef, popstar, athlete, detective or artist.

== Characters ==
- Hello Kitty
- Haroshee
- Frido
- Zonty
- Pinky
- Podo Pooch
- Rio
- Keroppi
- Tuck
- Timber
- Tulip
- Zing
- Badtz Maru
- P.I.
- Nori
- Vastus
- DB

== Development ==
Hello Kitty: Super Style! was first announced in 2019 as The World of Hello Kitty. It is a co-production between the French companies Watch Next Media and Monello Productions, and the Italian animation studio Maga Animation Studio.

The theme song was sung by pop artist Carly Rae Jepsen and written by Jared Faber.

== Release ==
Hello Kitty: Super Style! debuted on 7 December 2022 in a batch of 4 episodes on Amazon Kids+ in the United States, UK, Canada, Japan, and a few months after in Germany.

It is distributed internationally by Paris company Kids First, and airs on multiple networks like CBC and Télémagino in Canada, Discovery Kids in Latin America, Canal Panda in Portugal, RTS 1 in Switzerland, Rai Yoyo in Italy, Clan in Spain, Canal+ Kids, Piwi+ and M6 in France, Super RTL in Germany, MiniMini+ in Poland, and Tiny Pop in the UK.
