= Action Pack (TV series) =

American educational animated television series

- Promotional poster; clockwise: Treena, Clay, Watts, and Wren
- Genre: Preschool; Superhero; Adventure
- Created by: William Harper
- Developed by: Shea Fontana
- Voices of: Sydney Thomas; Oscar Reyez; Julieta Cortes; Nevin Kar; Giancarlo Sabogal
- Theme music composer: Mike Barnett
- Opening theme: "Action Pack Theme" by Keira Moran and Mike Barnett
- Composer: Mike Barnett
- Country of origin: United States
- Original language: English
- No. of seasons: 2
- No. of episodes: 16 + 1 special (29 segments)

Production
- Executive producers: Chris Hamilton; Eden Den; The Dailyn Brothers
- Producers: Greg Chalekian; Olea Tvengsberg
- Editor: Zachary Aufdemberg
- Running time: 27–29 minutes
- Production company: OddBot Animation

Original release
- Network: Netflix
- Release: January 4 – June 6, 2022

Action Pack is an American animated preschool television series developed by Shea Fontana for Netflix. Created by William Harper, the series debuted on January 4, 2022. A second season was released on June 6, 2022. A special, titled The Action Pack Saves Christmas, was released on November 28, 2022.

== Premise ==
The series takes place in fictional Hope Springs, where the Action Pack; Treena, Watts, Wren, and Clay, a quartet of young superheroes-in-training are taught by their teacher Mr. Ernesto and his robotic dog Plunky.

== Voice cast ==
=== Main ===
- Sydney Thomas as Treena Swanson, a girl who uses powers controlling plant life, fitting in with her love of nature. Her color is green, and her badge has a flower shape. She serves as the Action Pack's leader. She uses the "Petal Power Shield" and the "Awesomer Blossomer" baton gadget, which lets her sprout vines for swinging or grabbing and uses a dandelion-like balloon to float. Her powers are upgraded in the final episode of season 2, where she obtains the power to create vine cages, do a "Petal Copter", and speak to plants. Even as a civilian, she is an excellent gardener and can instantly make plants grow.
- Oscar Reyez as Watts Keynes, a boy who uses powers controlling electricity. His color is blue, and his badge has a pair of lightning bolts. Watts is the most energetic and impatient of the team, and can morph his legs into lightning bolts for super speed and flight and throw Captain Rex or ball lightning.
- Julieta Cortes as Wren Reyes, a girl who can use animal abilities. Her color is yellow, and her badge has a cat's paw print. Wren is the most empathetic team member, and she often uses the powers of a butterfly's flight, a polar bear's strength, a fox's smell, an alligator's protection, a mouse's small size, and a cheetah's speed. She loves animals and claims she can communicate with them.
- Nevin Kar as Clay Patel, a boy who uses powers controlling plasma and forcefields. His color is red, and his badge has a sun shape. A pacifist, Clay is the most reserved member of the team, and his body is composed of a form of plasma that allows him to shapeshift and stretch or deform his body. He can also see through things with his "plasma vision" and create "invinci-balls" that protect against anything.
- Giancarlo Sabogal as Mr. Ernesto Action, the adult mentor of the Action Pack and great nephew of Great Uncle Action, who is the founder of the Action Academy. He is the patient and kind instructor at the Action Academy and the Action Pack's mentor. Although he doesn't have any super special powers of his own, Mr. Ernesto is empathetic toward the evil villains and provides the Action Pack with all the support and wisdom they need in order to save the day. He is accompanied by a robotic dog named Plunky.
- Plunky is Mr. Ernesto’s robotic dog who acts as his trusty companion and teaching assistant who keeps the Action Pack company and alerts them with any important information that they need to know.

=== Villains ===
- Jason Maybaum as Teddy Von Taker, a boy whose family is known for their compulsive desire to steal, himself included. As his name suggests, he always causes trouble by seeking to pilfer what isn't rightfully his, with various attachments including a vacuum-cleaner, a magnet, a net, and a hook. He usually sends his army of sentient toys (most notably his teddy bears) to serve under him. He has the most appearances of the villains.
- Billie Schloss as Gamer Girl, a villain who controls a real-life, deadly video game.

=== Recurring ===
- Hartley Wexler as Dinah Rex, a young girl obsessed with dinosaurs. This obsession has led her to perform several acts of villainy throughout town, mainly carried out by her robotic dinosaur minions. She is a determined girl who wants everyone to turn into dinosaurs, since she is part dinosaur herself. She eventually reforms and becomes the Action Pack's friend.
- Lotus Blossom as Abby, Gabby, and Maddy, three identical triplets who live in Hope Springs. Gabby has a yellow streak in her hair and Abby has red, both usually being happy. Maddy, however, has a purple streak in her hair, and unlike her sisters is usually seen with somewhat emo behavior.
- Kimberly Brooks as Jackie, a close friend of the Action Pack who is an archeologist that studies dinosaur bones, but this is not an often employed trait. She wears a striped scarf around her neck.
- Kimberly Brooks as Nelly, a kindly and neighborly gardener and another good friend of the Action Pack who knows how to cultivate and take care of her plants. She has a star earring on her left ear and a moon earring on the right ear.
- Giancarlo Sabogal as Hot Dog Vendor, a hot dog vendor with no definite name who lives up to his occupation.
- Giancarlo Sabogal as Mr. Grumpman, an old man who often shows up on the street to whine about how he usually gets caught in the middle of chaos happening in Hope Springs, likewise/whereas the Action Pack have saved his life on many occasions, but he never displays gratitude afterwards.
- Briana Leon as Paleo Paulette, a professional palaeontologist at the Hope Springs Natural History Museum.
- Daisuke Tsuji as Mr. Chang, a stout man with a very pleasant and respectable disposition. He sometimes usually hangs out Jackie, indicating to the viewers that they're a couple.
- Paty Lombard as Ira the Superintendent, the superintendent of the Action Pack's school, who hears all, sees all. She keeps things in order with her patient but rather firm ways. Some claim that she's not easily impressed, however several episodes showing her impressed with the Action Pack's rescues and other stuff don't provide support for this claim.
- Rhys Darby as Mr. Villainmun, an evil magician and textbook villain who originally intends to steal a powerful magical wand. In one episode it is revealed that he simply wants to grant his childhood birthday wish, which Clay gives him.
- Sander as Cold Snap, a young boy with white skin who enjoys playing in cold weather. He has the power to control the weather. Although he originally intends to force everyone to have winter fun, despite their disinterest, he later uses his powers for good to make ice cream.
- Jason Hightower as Phil Donut, the local baker of Hope Springs.
- Brennley Brown as Pepper (a.k.a. Baker Bandit), a baker who is determined to outdo Phil Donut, using numerous pastry-themed weapons to aid in her villainous methods. She originally wants to sabotage Phil's bakery to make her own business thrive, but like most of the series' villains, she reforms after a number of episodes.
- John Eric Bentley as Crimson Cape/Rupert, a former student and current full time superhero. He is Watts' idol.
- Jakari Fraser as Mason, a friend of Treena's and a young boy with rock-like skin. He is eager and tends to be too rambunctious with his powers, which can lead to collateral damage. His powers include rolling up into a sphere shape and super strength.
- Eleanor Noel Delgadillo as Sky Patel, Clay's younger sister with a similar power set.
- Poonam Basu as Mrs. Patel, Clay and Sky's mother from an Indian descent who owns a mobile library. Her family celebrates Rakhi.

=== Minor ===
- Jim Conroy as Chuckles, a clown villain who later becomes the Crimson Cape's sidekick.
- Wanda Arriaga as Grandelivery, Wren's grandmother and a superhero with mail-related powers.
- Lynden as Tella-Portanya, a small girl (and reformed villain) who can teleport.
- Lotus Blossom as Felicia the Fear Fighter, an ancient superhero from a hundred years ago, whose mission is to help anyone face their fears. She is also the devoted owner of a supernatural superhero cat named Super Meowzers (whom Watts was initially afraid of due to his fear of cats), who was accidentally and magically brought to life by the touch of the "Scepter of Paw-er" tablet.
- Jakari Fraser as Rom, a boy with technology powers. He is from a black Korean descent. His name is derived from the term "read-only memory".
- Mia Armstrong as Eon, a girl who can pause time. She is friends with the Action Pack and has Down syndrome.
- Kimberly Brooks as Dinah Rex's Mother, the unseen mother of Dinah Rex who is only heard in the series.
- Callie C. Miller as Tella-Portanya's Mother, the unseen mother of Tella-Portanya who is only heard in the series.
- Melanie Minichino as Eon's Mom, the mother of Eon in the series.
- Jason Hightower as Santa, a holiday superhero who saves Christmas with the help of the Action Pack.

== Episodes ==
=== Series overview ===
Season	Episodes	Originally released
1	10	January 4, 2022
2	6	June 6, 2022
Special	1	November 28, 2022

=== Season 1 (2022) ===
No. overall	No. in season	Title	Directed by	Written by	Original release date
1	1	"Fright at the Museum"	Phil Allora	Shea Fontana	January 4, 2022
1	1	"Catching Cold"	Phil Allora	Shea Fontana	January 4, 2022
Watts' overeager desire to finish a mission quickly results in him deserting his team at critical moments, resulting in a problematic mission when robotic dinosaurs break into the natural history museum. A spring day is almost ruined when Cold Snap, unable to understand how the others are feeling, begins freezing everything and begin the winter season severely early. This has significant effects on Treena's powers, which begin to weaken with the cold.
2	2	"Mason Impossible"	Phil Allora	Merrill Hagan	January 4, 2022
2	2	"Hero of the Day"	James Lopez	Han-Yee Ling	January 4, 2022
Mason throws a tantrum when he is unable to join a dinosaur dig, and ends up causing a cave in that only he can help deal with. While working to find a stolen trowel, Mason, the "Hero of the Day", goes several times without his team, causing several problems on the way.
3	3	"Awesome Possum"	James Lopez	Max Beaudry	January 4, 2022
3	3	"Frozen Fiasco"	Phil Allora	Francisco Paredes	January 4, 2022
Wren takes an opossum to the academy and it takes off with the Mega-Van, but the situation gets zany when the creature gets accidentally supercharged by Watts. Cold Snap's gloves suffer a malfunction that makes him unable to control them. When Watts assumes he has turned back to the bad side, the electric hero worsens the problem by sending the gloves into overdrive.
4	4	"Sky's the Limit"	James Lopez	Michael J. Beall	January 4, 2022
4	4	"All That Llama Drama"	Phil Allora	Marie Cheng	January 4, 2022
Clay's little sister Sky enlarges herself to be a big kid, but she ends up towering over the town and needs to be shrunken back down. The Action Pack work to rescue a pair of Llamas... Llamas planted by Dinah as a distraction while she attempts to steal a weapon from the Vault of Villains.
5	5	"A Good Day to Dino"	Phil Allora & James Lopez	Story by : Jennifer Skelly & Matt Wayne; Teleplay by : Matt Wayne	January 4, 2022
Dinah begins her plan to turn all of Hope Springs into living dinosaurs for her tea party, and when Watts pushes down his feelings the situation quickly escalates.
6	6	"Trophy Trouble"	Phil Allora	Merrill Hagan	January 4, 2022
6	6	"Meet Mr. Villainman"	James Lopez	Jeff Trammell	January 4, 2022
Ira the superintendent arrives and tries to rearrange the curriculum based on her own rules, but the group ends up losing sight of the main goal. A new villain kidnaps Mr. Ernesto and takes his place as the Action Pack's teacher, and he successfully convinces the team to help him steal from the vault of villains.
7	7	"Power Nap"	Phil Allora	Matt Wayne	January 4, 2022
7	7	"The Crimson Cape Returns"	Phil Allora	Mercedes Valle	January 4, 2022
Watts is out of the mission when he contracts the Fizzles, and after he goes on a mission against the advice of Mr. Ernesto his attempts to help stop Tella-Portanya ends up spreading his disease across the entire town. The team has the special mission of being assistant teachers for Mr. Ernesto so that a certain hero can pass the teamwork class: The Crimson Cape. However, the temporary student is no easy challenge.
8	8	"Action-Packed Party"	Phil Allora	Michael J. Beall	January 4, 2022
8	8	"Dog Daze"	James Lopez	Brandon Hoang	January 4, 2022
Mr. Villainman plots to steal one of Clay's new birthday presents, and the team must stop him when he succeeds. A schoolmate at the academy manages to take Plunky while she was under Wren's watch, and she must hurry before Mr. Ernesto discovers her blunder.
9	9	"Picture Perfect"	James Lopez	Michael J. Beall	January 4, 2022
9	9	"Cookie Chaos"	James Lopez	Callie C. Miller	January 4, 2022
Treena is determined for the team to have strong school photos, but Wren isn't being serious, and things get worse when she becomes stuck as a polar bear. Wren and her grandmother accidentally unleash cookie cowboys meant for Phil Donut while the Baker Bandit steals his spatula, forcing Gran-Delivery and the Action Pack to join forces.
10	10	"A Half-Baked Scheme"	Phil Allora	Brandon Hoang	January 4, 2022
10	10	"Heroism is a Piece of Cake"	James Lopez	Mercedes Valle	January 4, 2022
Clay is nervous about his final test, but he must push through his doubts when the Baker Bandit strikes for the spatula. The Baker Bandit kidnaps Phil Donut before the team's level-up ceremony, and the team is tasked with their last mission as Level 1 superheroes.

=== Season 2 (2022) ===
No. overall	No. in season	Title	Directed by	Written by	Original release date
11	1	"Super Meowzers"	Phil Allora & Nick Bertonazzi Jr.	Mercedes Valle	June 6, 2022
11	1	"Story Crime"	Phil Allora & Nick Bertonazzi Jr.	Han-Yee Ling	June 6, 2022
The team tries to catch a superhero cat that escaped the museum. Teddy Von Taker and his teddy bears have taken all the books from a mobile library.
12	2	"The Importance of Being Ernesto"	James Lopez & Seung W. Cha	Callie C. Miller	June 6, 2022
12	2	"The Cool Kid"	James Lopez & Seung W. Cha	Merrill Hagan	June 6, 2022
Mr. Ernesto and Plunky switch bodies right before Mr. Ernesto's big teacher review. Watts gets jealous when Cold Snap sits in with the class.
13	3	"Pterodactyl Troubles"	Nick Bertonazzi Jr.	Ghia Godfree	June 6, 2022
13	3	"Super Tiny MegaPlane"	Nick Bertonazzi Jr.	Mercedes Valle	June 6, 2022
The team takes a spin on their new MegaPlane to track down Dinah Rex's pterodactyl, Terrance. Rom helps the crew search for the mini-sized MegaPlane.
14	4	"Chores Galore"	Nick Bertonazzi Jr.	Michael J. Beall	June 6, 2022
14	4	"Play Time"	Nick Bertonazzi Jr.	Shea Fontana	June 6, 2022
With no baddies causing problems, the team helps everyone with their chores. Recess lasts longer with new pal Eon and her power to pause time.
15	5	"The Rakhi Rundown"	James Lopez & Seung W. Cha	Jagjiwan Sohal	June 6, 2022
15	5	"Gaming The System"	Seung W. Cha	Jeff Trammell	June 6, 2022
Clay and Sky share their family's traditions despite Teddy's tricks. The team must defeat a new villain after getting zapped inside a video game.
16	6	"Once in a Blue Noon"	Nick Bertonazzi Jr.	Mercedes Valle	June 6, 2022
When a special flower starts to grow giant-sized, the Action Pack must make sure its sticky vines don't grow out of control and take over the town!

=== Special (2022) ===
No. overall	No. in season	Title	Directed by	Written by	Original release date
17	S1	"The Action Pack Saves Christmas"	Seung W. Cha & James Lopez	Shea Fontana	November 28, 2022
The Action Pack and Santa team up to stop Teddy Von Taker from stealing all the Christmas cheer.

== Production ==
The series was first announced back in September 2021 as part of four Netflix Original Preschool shows targeted at 2-6 year olds.

== Reception ==
On IMDb, Action Pack holds a rating of 6.2/10.

== Release ==
Action Pack premiered on January 4, 2022, globally on Netflix. A trailer was released on December 7, 2021.
