= Netflix Animation Studios =

American animation studio

- Logo used since 2025
- Formerly: Netflix Animation (2018–2024)
- Type: Subsidiary
- Industry: Animation; Film production Television production
- Predecessor: Animal Logic
- Founded: March 2018; 8 years ago
- Headquarters: Burbank, California, United States
- Number of locations: Sydney, New South Wales, Australia; Vancouver, British Columbia, Canada
- Key people: Hannah Minghella (head of Netflix Animation Studio); Amir Nasrabadi (COO)
- Products: Feature films Television shows
- Parent: Netflix, Inc.
- Website: www.netflixanimation.com

Netflix Animation Studios is an American animation studio and production company that was founded in March 2018 and is a subsidiary of Netflix, Inc. It is based in Burbank, California with offices in Sydney, Australia and Vancouver, Canada. The studio develops and produces animated feature films and television series, which are all released on the Netflix streaming service.

The studio has produced 19 feature films, with its first film being Klaus, released on November 15, 2019; and its latest being Steps, released on November 20, 2026. Their upcoming slate of films includes Charlie vs. the Chocolate Factory on November 5, 2027.

== History ==
When Netflix began producing original animated content in 2013, all projects were created by external studios, most notably DreamWorks Animation Television. This arrangement continued for several years. In November 2018, Netflix announced that it had begun developing original animated works in-house, including Klaus and Kid Cosmic. In 2019, Netflix Animation expanded its operations by leasing dedicated production spaces in Burbank and Hollywood to support its growing slate of animated series and films.

The division grew further in July 2022 with Netflix's acquisition of the Australian animation and visual-effects studio Animal Logic. That same month, Melissa Cobb stepped down as vice president of film animation and moved into a producer role, with Karen Toliver appointed as her successor. Following the acquisition, Animal Logic's operations were integrated into Netflix Animation in January 2024 as part of a broader consolidation of the company's in-house animation production to create Netflix Animation Studios. As part of the acquisition, Netflix Animation Studios also continues to collaborate with the University of Technology Sydney to support the UTS Animal Logic Academy. In June 2024, Hannah Minghella was named head of feature animation and live-action family film at Netflix, succeeding Toliver. In June 2026, live-action family film responsibilities were transferred to Netflix film VP Kira Goldberg, with Minghella now overseeing just feature animation and named head of Netflix Animation Studios.

== Films ==
Release timeline
2019	Klaus
2020	The Willoughbys
2020	Over the Moon
2021	Arlo the Alligator Boy
2021	America: The Motion Picture
2021	Back to the Outback
2022	Apollo 10½: A Space Age Childhood
2022	The Sea Beast
2022	Wendell & Wild
2022	My Father's Dragon
2022	Guillermo del Toro's Pinocchio
2023	The Magician's Elephant
2023	The Monkey King
2023	Leo
2024	Thelma the Unicorn
2024	Ultraman: Rising
2025	The Twits
2025	In Your Dreams
2026	Steps
2027	Charlie vs. the Chocolate Factory

Title	Release date	Director(s)	Writer(s)		Producer(s)	Composer(s)	Co-production with	Animation service(s)	Notes
Title	Release date	Director(s)	Story	Screenplay	Producer(s)	Composer(s)	Co-production with	Animation service(s)	Notes
Klaus	November 15, 2019	Sergio Pablos Co-director: Carlos Martínez López	Sergio Pablos	Sergio Pablos; Jim Mahoney; Zach Lewis	Jinko Gotoh; Sergio Pablos; Marisa Roman; Matt Teevan; Mercedes Gamero; Mikel Lejarza; Gustavo Ferrada	Alfonso G. Aguilar	The SPA Studios; Atresmedia Cine	The SPA Studios; Les Films Du Poisson Rogue; Sell Out Animation; Yowza! Animation; 3.0 Studio; Inspidea; J Studios; Snipple Animation; Animago; Ink Animation	First feature film Copyright by Sergio Pablos
The Willoughbys	April 22, 2020	Kris Pearn Co-director: Rob Lodermeier	Kris Pearn	Kris Pearn; Mark Stanleigh	Brenda Gilbert; Luke Carroll	Mark Mothersbaugh	Bron Studios; Creative Wealth Media Finance	Bron Animation	Based on the novel of the same name by Lois Lowry
Over the Moon	October 23, 2020	Glen Keane Co-director: John Kahrs	Audrey Wells		Gennie Rim; Peilin Chou	Steven Price (score) Christopher Curtis; Marjorie Duffield; Helen Park (songs)	Pearl Studio; Glen Keane Productions	Pearl Studio; Sony Pictures Imageworks	Based on an idea by Janet Yang inspired by the Chinese myth.
Arlo the Alligator Boy	April 16, 2021	Ryan Crego		Ryan Crego; Clay Senechal	—N/a	Alex Geringas (score) Alex Geringas; Ryan Crego (songs)	Titmouse, Inc.		Prequel to the series I Heart Arlo
America: The Motion Picture	June 30, 2021	Matt Thompson	Dave Callaham		Phil Lord; Christopher Miller; Will Allegra; Channing Tatum; Peter Kiernan; Reid Carolin; Matt Thompson; Eric Sims; Dave Callaham; Christian Danley; Neal Holman	Mark Mothersbaugh	Lord Miller Productions; Free Association; Floyd County Productions; Jittery Dog Productions	Floyd County Productions; Combo Estúdio; Mighty Animation; Big Jump Entertainment	Adult animated film
Back to the Outback	December 10, 2021	Clare Knight; Harry Cripps	Gregory Lessans; Harry Cripps	Harry Cripps	Daniela Mazzucato	Rupert Gregson-Williams	Weed Road Pictures	Reel FX Animation	
Apollo 10½: A Space Age Childhood	April 1, 2022	Richard Linklater			Richard Linklater; Mike Blizzard; Tommy Pallotta; Femke Wolting; Bruno Felix	—N/a	Detour Filmproduction; World of Submarine	Minnow Mountain	
The Sea Beast	July 8, 2022	Chris Williams		Chris Williams; Nell Benjamin	Jed Schlanger; Chris Williams	Mark Mancina	—N/a	Sony Pictures Imageworks	
Wendell & Wild	October 28, 2022	Henry Selick	Henry Selick; Jordan Peele		Henry Selick; Ellen Goldsmith-Vein; Jordan Peele; Win Rosenfeld	Bruno Coulais	Monkeypaw Productions; Gotham Group	Henry Selick's independent crew	Based on an unpublished book by Henry Selick and Clay McLeod Chapman
My Father's Dragon	November 11, 2022	Nora Twomey	Meg LeFauve; John Morgan	Meg LeFauve	Bonnie Curtis; Julie Lynn; Paul Young	Mychael Danna; Jeff Danna	Cartoon Saloon; Mockingbird Pictures; Parallel Films	Cartoon Saloon	Based on the novel of the same name by Ruth Stiles Gannett
Guillermo del Toro's Pinocchio	December 9, 2022	Guillermo del Toro; Mark Gustafson	Guillermo del Toro; Matthew Robbins	Guillermo del Toro; Patrick McHale	Guillermo del Toro; Lisa Henson; Gary Ungar; Alex Bulkley; Corey Campodonico	Alexandre Desplat	Double Dare You Productions; The Jim Henson Company; ShadowMachine	ShadowMachine; Taller del Chucho	Based on the 1883 Italian novel The Adventures of Pinocchio by Carlo Collodi and Gris Grimly's design from his 2002 edition of the novel
The Magician's Elephant	March 17, 2023	Wendy Rogers	Martin Hynes		Julia Pistor	Mark Mothersbaugh	Pistor Productions	Animal Logic	Based on the novel of the same name by Kate DiCamillo
The Monkey King	August 18, 2023	Anthony Stacchi	Steve Bencich; Ron J. Friedman; Rita Hsiao		Peilin Chou	Toby Chu (score) Toby Marlow; Lucy Moss (songs)	Pearl Studio	Reel FX Animation; Little Zoo Studio; Agora Studio; Golden Wolf	Originally slated to be produced from Tangent Animation; Based on the classic Ming dynasty novel Journey to the West.
Leo	November 21, 2023	Robert Marianetti; Robert Smigel; David Wachtenheim	Robert Smigel; Adam Sandler; Paul Sado		Adam Sandler; Mireille Soria	Geoff Zanelli (score) Robert Smigel (songs)	Happy Madison Productions	Animal Logic	Originally slated to be from STX Entertainment
Thelma the Unicorn	May 17, 2024	Jared Hess; Lynn Wang	Jared Hess; Jerusha Hess		Pam Coats	John Powell	Scholastic Entertainment	Mikros Animation; Agora Studio	Based on the book of the same name by Aaron Blabey
Ultraman: Rising	June 14, 2024	Shannon Tindle Co-director: John Aoshima	Shannon Tindle; Marc Haimes		Tom Knott; Lisa M. Poole	Scot Stafford	Tsuburaya Productions	Industrial Light & Magic	Based on an original idea from Shannon Tindle, originally stated to be produced from Sony Pictures Animation; Inspired by the franchise by Tsuburaya Productions
The Twits	October 17, 2025	Phil Johnston Co-directors: Todd Kunjan Demong; Katie Shanahan	Phil Johnston; Meg Favreau		Phil Johnston; Maggie Malone; Daisy May West	Oli Julian (score) David Byrne (songs)	The Roald Dahl Story Company	Jellyfish Pictures; Minimo VFX	Originally slated to be a television series Based on the book of the same name by Roald Dahl
In Your Dreams	November 14, 2025	Alex Woo Co-director: Erik Benson	Alex Woo; Erik Benson; Stanley Moore	Alex Woo; Erik Benson	Tim Hahn; Gregg Taylor	John Debney	Kuku Studios	Sony Pictures Imageworks	Inspired by the Sandman
Steps	November 20, 2026	Alyce Tzue; John Ripa	Ava Tramer; James Madejski; Dana Schwartz; Felicia Ho; Riki Lindhome; Kate Micucci	Ava Tramer; James Madejski; Jen Chuck; Dana Schwartz; Felicia Ho	Jane Hartwell; Amy Poehler; Kim Lessing	Kris Bowers (score) Justin Tranter (songs)	Paper Kite Productions	Netflix Animation Studios	Based on the fairy tale Cinderella, inspired by an idea from Garfunkel and Oates

=== Upcoming ===
Title	Release date	Director(s)	Writer(s)		Producer(s)	Composer(s)	Co-production with	Animation service(s)	Notes
Title	Release date	Director(s)	Story	Screenplay	Producer(s)	Composer(s)	Co-production with	Animation service(s)	Notes
Charlie vs. the Chocolate Factory	November 5, 2027	Jared Stern; Elaine Bogan	—N/a	—N/a	Aron Warner; Timothy Yoo	—N/a	The Roald Dahl Story Company	Sony Pictures Imageworks	Based on characters from Charlie and the Chocolate Factory by Roald Dahl

==== In development ====
Title	Director(s)	Writer(s)	Co-production with	Animation service(s)	Notes
The Buried Giant	Guillermo del Toro	Guillermo del Toro; Dennis Kelly	ShadowMachine; Double Dare You Productions	ShadowMachine	Based on the novel of the same name by Kazuo Ishiguro

=== Critical reception ===
Film	Critical	
Film	Rotten Tomatoes	Metacritic
Klaus	95%	65
The Willoughbys	91%	68
Over the Moon	81%	60
Arlo the Alligator Boy	85%	TBD
America: The Motion Picture	35%	38
Back to the Outback	82%	58
Apollo 10 1/2: A Space Age Childhood	91%	79
The Sea Beast	94%	74
Wendell & Wild	80%	69
My Father's Dragon	87%	74
Guillermo del Toro's Pinocchio	96%	79
The Magician's Elephant	67%	53
The Monkey King	58%	59
Leo	84%	65
Thelma the Unicorn	60%	64
Ultraman: Rising	82%	66
The Twits	52%	48
In Your Dreams	86%	61
Steps	77%	53

== Television series ==
=== Adult animation ===
Title	Creator(s) / Showrunner(s)	Seasons, Episodes	Runtime	Premiere	Finale	Co-production with	Notes
The Midnight Gospel	Pendleton Ward; Duncan Trussell	1 season, 8 episodes	20–36 min	April 20, 2020		Titmouse, Inc.	First television series Canceled
Inside Job	Shion Takeuchi	1 season (2 parts), 18 episodes	26–31 min	October 22, 2021	November 18, 2022	Taco Gucci	Animation services by Jam Filled Entertainment; Canceled 7 months after being renewed for a second season, shortly following Mike Moon's departure of Netflix Animation.
Farzar	Roger Black; Waco O'Guin	1 season, 10 episodes	25–29 min	July 15, 2022		Bento Box Entertainment; Damn! Show Productions; Odenkirk Provissiero Entertainment	Canceled
Dragon Age: Absolution	Mairghread Scott	1 season, 6 episodes	25–27 min	December 9, 2022		BioWare; Red Dog Culture House	Anime-style series; Based on the Dragon Age video game franchise by BioWare; Ended
Skull Island	Brian Duffield	1 season, 8 episodes	20–26 min	June 22, 2023		Legendary Television; Powerhouse Animation Studios; JP	Anime-style series; part of Legendary Entertainment's MonsterVerse; Ended
Captain Fall	Jon Helgaker; Jonas Torgersen; Joel Trussell	1 season, 10 episodes	20–23 min	July 28, 2023		Writers & Models	Animation services by Boulder Media; Canceled
Captain Laserhawk: A Blood Dragon Remix	Adi Shankar	1 season, 6 episodes	20–25 min	October 19, 2023		Ubisoft Film & Television; Bobbypills; Bootleg Universe	Anime-style series; based on the 2013 video game Far Cry 3: Blood Dragon by Ubisoft; Ended
Blue Eye Samurai	Michael Green; Amber Noizumi	1 season, 8 episodes	35–62 min	November 3, 2023	present	J.A. Green Construction Corporation; 3 Arts Entertainment	Anime-style series; Animation Services by Blue Spirit; Renewed for seasons 2–3 (final)
Carol & The End of The World	Dan Guterman	10 episodes	25–33 min	December 15, 2023			Animation services by Bardel Entertainment; Miniseries
Exploding Kittens	Matthew Inman; Shane Kosakowski	1 season, 9 episodes	24–27 min	July 12, 2024		Chomp City; Bandera Entertainment; Chernin Entertainment	Based on the card game of the same name by Matthew Inman; animation services by Jam Filled Entertainment; Canceled
Terminator Zero	Mattson Tomlin	1 season, 8 episodes	25–29 min	August 29, 2024		Production I.G; No Brakes; Skydance Television	Anime series; based on the Terminator film franchise by James Cameron and Gale Anne Hurd; animation services by Production I.G; Canceled
Twilight of the Gods	Zack Snyder; Jay Oliva; Eric Carrasco	1 season, 8 episodes	27–42 min	September 19, 2024		The Stone Quarry	Animation services by Xilam Animation; Canceled
Tomb Raider: The Legend of Lara Croft	Tasha Huo	2 seasons, 16 episodes	24–35 min	October 10, 2024	December 11, 2025	Crystal Dynamics; DJ2 Entertainment; Powerhouse Animation Studios; Panda Burrow; Legendary Television	Anime-style series; follow-up to its video game reboot trilogy by Crystal Dynamics; Canceled
Long Story Short	Raphael Bob-Waksberg	1 season, 10 episodes	25 min	August 22, 2025	present	The Tornante Company; Vegan Blintzes; ShadowMachine	Renewed
Haunted Hotel	Matt Roller	2 seasons, 18 episodes	24–26 min	September 19, 2025	present	Magic Giraffe; Harmonious Claptrap; Americano Brutto; Titmouse, Inc.	Renewed
Splinter Cell: Deathwatch	Derek Kolstad	1 season, 8 episodes	20–27 min	October 14, 2025	present	Tradecraft; Sun Creature Studio; FOST Studio; Ubisoft Film & Television	Anime-style series; based on the Splinter Cell video game franchise by Ubisoft; Renewed
Strip Law	Cullen Crawford	1 season, 10 episodes	25–27 min	February 20, 2026		Underground; Titmouse, Inc.	Canceled
Mating Season	Andrew Goldberg; Nick Kroll; Mark Levin; Jennifer Flackett	1 season, 10 episodes	22 min	May 22, 2026		Brutus Pink; Titmouse, Inc.	
Alley Cats	Ricky Gervais	1 season, 6 episodes	15–17 min	August 7, 2026		Derek Productions Limited; Shush Creative; Blink Industries	

=== Kids & family ===
Title	Creator(s) / Showrunner(s)	Seasons, Episodes	Runtime	Premiere	Finale	Co-production with	Notes
Trash Truck	Max Keane	2 seasons, 28 episodes	10–17 min	November 10, 2020	present	Glen Keane Productions	Renewed
Kid Cosmic	Craig McCracken	3 seasons, 24 episodes	17–25 min	February 2, 2021	February 3, 2022	CMCC Cartoons	Ended
City of Ghosts	Elizabeth Ito	1 season, 6 episodes	18–20 min	March 5, 2021		TeamTO	Canceled
We the People	Chris Nee	10 episodes	4–5 min	July 4, 2021		Higher Ground Productions; Khalabo Ink Society; Laughing Wild	Miniseries
Ridley Jones	Chris Nee	5 seasons, 35 episodes	27–28 min	July 13, 2021	March 6, 2023	Brown Bag Films; Laughing Wild	Canceled
Centaurworld	Megan Nicole Dong	2 seasons, 18 episodes	25–73 min	July 30, 2021	December 7, 2021	Sketchshark Productions	Ended
I Heart Arlo	Ryan Crego	1 season, 19 episodes	14–25 min	August 27, 2021		Titmouse, Inc.	Follow-up to the film Arlo the Alligator Boy; Ended
Ada Twist, Scientist	Chris Nee	4 seasons, 41 episodes	29 min	September 28, 2021	April 22, 2023	Brown Bag Films; Higher Ground Productions; Laughing Wild; Wonder Worldwide	Based on children's picture book of the same name by Andrea Beaty; Ended
A Tale Dark & Grimm	Simon Otto; Doug Langdale	10 episodes	27–30 min	October 8, 2021		Boat Rocker Studios; Novo Media Group; Astro-Nomical Entertainment	Based on the children's book series of the same name by Adam Gidwitz; Miniseries
Karma's World	Chris Bridges	4 seasons, 40 episodes	13 min	October 15, 2021	September 22, 2022	Brown Bag Films; Creative Affairs Group; Karma's World Entertainment	Ended
Maya and the Three	Jorge R. Gutiérrez	9 episodes	33–44 min	October 22, 2021		Maya Entertainment; Mexopolis; Tangent Animation	Miniseries
Dogs in Space	Jeremiah Cortez	2 seasons, 20 episodes	20–25 min	November 18, 2021	September 15, 2022	GrizzlyJerr Productions	Animation services by Atomic Cartoons; Ended
Action Pack	William Harper; Shea Fontana	2 seasons, 16 episodes	22–23 min	January 4, 2022	June 6, 2022	OddBot Inc. ICON Creative Studio	Ended
The Cuphead Show!	Dave Wasson	3 seasons, 36 episodes	11–31 min	February 18, 2022	November 18, 2022	King Features Syndicate; Studio MDHR	Based on the 2017 video game Cuphead by Studio MDHR; Ended
Battle Kitty	Matt Layzell; Paul Layzell	1 season, 9 episodes	22–54 min	April 19, 2022		Plastic Wax; Layzell Bros	Interactive series Based on the webcomic The Adventures of Kitty & Orc by Matt Layzell; Removed from Netflix on December 1, 2024
Samurai Rabbit: The Usagi Chronicles	Doug Langdale; Candie Kelty Langdale	2 seasons, 20 episodes	24–26 min	April 28, 2022	September 1, 2022	Gaumont Animation; Atomic Monster; Dark Horse Entertainment	Based on the comic book series Usagi Yojimbo by Stan Sakai; Ended
Dead End: Paranormal Park	Hamish Steele	2 seasons, 20 episodes	25–31 min	June 16, 2022	October 13, 2022	Blink Industries	Based on the graphic novel series DeadEndia by Hamich Steele; Canceled
Super Giant Robot Brothers	Víctor Maldonado; Alfredo Torres	1 season, 10 episodes	24–27 min	August 4, 2022		Reel FX Creative Studios; Assemblage Entertainment	Ended
Oddballs	James Rallison; Ethan Banville	2 seasons, 20 episodes	17–20 min	October 7, 2022	February 24, 2023	Atomic Cartoons	Canceled
Spirit Rangers	Karissa Valencia	3 seasons, 39 episodes	20–23 min	October 10, 2022	April 8, 2024	Laughing Wild; Superprod Animation	Canceled
Oni: Thunder God's Tale	Daisuke Tsutsumi	4 episodes	42–47 min	October 21, 2022		Tonko House	Miniseries
Daniel Spellbound	Matt Fernandes	2 seasons, 20 episodes	22–26 min	October 27, 2022	January 26, 2023	Boat Rocker Studios; Industrial Brothers	Ended
Sonic Prime	Joe Casey; Joe Kelly; Duncan Rouleau; Steven T. Seagle	3 seasons, 23 episodes	21–43 min	December 15, 2022	January 11, 2024	Sega of America; WildBrain Studios; Man of Action Entertainment	Based on the Sonic the Hedgehog video game franchise by Sega; Ended
My Dad the Bounty Hunter	Evrett Downing Jr. Patrick Harpin	2 seasons, 19 episodes	20–28 min	February 9, 2023	August 17, 2023	Dwarf Animation Studio	Canceled
Mech Cadets	Aaron Lam; Eileen Shim	1 season, 10 episodes	20–30 min	August 10, 2023		Boom! Studios; Polygon Pictures	Based on the comic book series Mech Cadet Yu by Greg Pak and Takeshi Miyazawa; Ended
Pokémon Concierge	Ogawa Iku	1 season (2 parts), 8 episodes	15–20 min	December 28, 2023	September 4, 2025	The Pokémon Company; Dwarf Studio	Ended
Bad Dinosaurs	Joel Veitch; David Shute	1 season, 8 episodes	20–24 min	March 28, 2024	present	Snafu Pictures	Renewed for seasons 2–3
Mermaid Magic	Iginio Straffi; Joanne Lee	2 seasons, 15 episodes	25–27 min	August 22, 2024	present	Rainbow SPA	
Jentry Chau vs. the Underworld	Echo Wu	1 season, 13 episodes	26–32 min	December 5, 2024		Buji Productions; Trespassers Will Inc. Lightbulb Farm Productions; Titmouse, Inc.	Ended
Wolf King	Tom Brass	2 seasons, 16 episodes	22–32 min	March 20, 2025	September 11, 2025	Lime Pictures	Based on the novel series Wereworld by Curtis Jobling; Canceled
Asterix and Obelix: The Big Fight	Alain Chabat	5 episodes	32–43 min	April 30, 2025		Les Éditions Dargaud; TAT Productions	Based on the comic book series Asterix by René Goscinny and Albert Uderzo; Miniseries
7 Bears	Robert Vargas	10 episodes	26–28 min	July 10, 2025		Folivari	Based on the graphic novel series The Seven Squat Bears by Émile Bravo; Miniseries
Dr. Seuss's Red Fish, Blue Fish	Dustin Ferrer	3 seasons, 15 episodes	23–31 min	September 8, 2025	present	Dr. Seuss Enterprises; Atomic Cartoons	Based on the book One Fish, Two Fish, Red Fish, Blue Fish by Dr. Seuss
Dr. Seuss's Horton!	Dustin Ferrer	2 seasons, 13 episodes	23–25 min	October 6, 2025	present	Dr. Seuss Enterprises; Brown Bag Films	Based on the character Horton the Elephant created by Dr. Seuss
Stranger Things: Tales from '85	Eric Robles	2 seasons, 18 episodes	25–32 min	April 23, 2026	present	21 Laps Entertainment; Upside Down Pictures; Flying Bark Productions	Spin-off of Stranger Things

=== Specials ===
Title	Creator(s)	Release date	Co-production with	Notes
The House	Paloma Baeza; Niki Lindroth von Bahr; Marc James Roels; Emma de Swaef	January 14, 2022	Nexus Studios	Anthology film special comprising three separate stories
Entergalactic	Kid Cudi; Kenya Barris	September 30, 2022	Mad Solar; Khalabo Ink Society; DNEG Animation	
We Lost Our Human	Chris Garbutt; Rikke Asbjoern	March 21, 2023	Jam Filled Entertainment	Interactive special Removed from Netflix on December 1, 2024
Dr. Seuss's The Sneetches	Dustin Ferrer	November 3, 2025	Dr. Seuss Enterprises; Brown Bag Films	Based on the short story of the same name by Dr. Seuss

=== Shorts ===
Title	Release date	Director	Co-production with	Notes
Canvas	December 11, 2020	Frank E. Abney III	Chainwheel Productions	
Cat Burglar	February 22, 2022	James Bowman	Broke & Bones; Boulder Media (animation services)	Interactive short film Removed from Netflix on December 1, 2024

=== Upcoming ===
Title	Creator(s) / Showrunner(s)	Release date	Co-production with	Notes
Living the Dream	George Gendi	December 18, 2026	Hanna-Barbera Studios Europe	Animation services by Boulder Media
Ghostbusters: Night Shift	Elliott Kalan	2027	Sony Pictures Animation; Ghost Corps	Animation services by Flying Bark Productions

==== In development ====
Title	Creator(s) / Showrunner(s)	Co-production with	Notes
Anchivo Motors	Brett Cawley; Robert Maitia	Underground	
Dealies	Joe Bennett; Ted Travelstead	Green Street Pictures	
Magic: The Gathering	Terry Matalas	Wizards of the Coast; Hasbro Entertainment	Based on the card game of the same name by Wizards of the Coast
Midnight Sun	TBA	Fickle Fish Films; Temple Hill Entertainment; Picturestart; Lionsgate Television	Based on the novel of the same name by Stephenie Meyer
Untitled BRZRKR series	Keanu Reeves	Company Films; Boom! Studios; Production I.G	Anime-style series; follow-up to its live-action film adaptation
Untitled Minecraft series	TBA	Mojang Studios; Flying Bark Productions; WildBrain Studios	Based on the video game franchise of the same name by Mojang Studios

== Canceled projects ==
=== Film ===
Title	Director(s)	Announced	Notes
Cattywumpus	Gore Verbinski	—N/a	Feature film canceled in September 2023. Previously shopped to other outlets.
Ember	Sergio Pablos	June 2022	Production on the series was suspended in December 2022. It was previously pitched to other outlets following Netflix's withdrawal.
Escape from Hat	Mark Osborne	November 2018	Based on the novel of the same name by Adam Kline. Originally picked up by Fox in 2017 as a Blue Sky Studios production.
High in the Clouds	Timothy Reckart	December 2019	Co-production with Gaumont Animation based on the novel of the same name by Paul McCartney. Netflix dropped their involvement in 2023, reverting the film back to an independent production with Toby Genkel replacing Reckart as director.
I, Chihuahua	Jorge R. Gutierrez	March 2022	Canceled due to creative differences in April 2024. Film revived by Snafu Pictures in February 2026.
Pashmina	Gurinder Chadha	March 2019	Feature film adaptation based on the graphic novel of the same name by Nidhi Chanani. Production canceled in December 2022.
Redwall	Patrick McHale	February 2021	Based on the novel Redwall by Brian Jacques; Stuck in development hell since 2022, with McHale later leaving the project. The project was abandoned by Netflix in 2026.
The Shrinking of Treehorn	Ron Howard	May 2022	Based on the children's book by Florence Parry Heide. Originally scheduled theatrically to be released on November 10, 2023 by Paramount Pictures under its Paramount Animation label. However, in May 2022, the distribution rights had shifted to Netflix under its Netflix Animation label with Howard's Imagine Entertainment as its production studio. In July 2024, it was reported that the film was canceled.
Tunga	—N/a	February 2019	Canceled during pre-production in October 2023.
Untitled Gorillaz film	Jamie Hewlett	November 2021	Feature film canceled in February 2023 amid more Netflix Animation.
With Kind Regards from Kindergarten	—N/a	—N/a	Feature film adaptation based on the novel of the same name by Adam Kline, originally picked up by Fox in 2017 as a live-action/animated hybrid. Production was canceled in May 2022.

=== Television series ===
Title	Creator(s) / Showrunner(s) / Director(s)	Announced	Notes
Antiracist Baby	Chris Nee	January 2021	Television series adaptation based on the novel of the same name by Ibram Kendi. Production canceled in May 2022.
Bad Crimes	Nicole Silverberg	January 2022	Adult animated series. Canceled mid-production in October 2022, and was previously pitched to other outlets.
Bone	Jeff Smith	October 2019	Series canceled during reorganization of Netflix Animation.
Boons and Curses	Jaydeep Hasrajani	May 2021	Originally set to be released in 2023, production was canceled in April 2022. It was previously pitched to other outlets.
City of Ghosts - Season 2	Elizabeth Ito	—N/a	Canceled during reorganization of Netflix Animation.
Dead End: Paranormal Park - Season 3	Hamish Steele	—N/a	Canceled during pre-production of the third season in January 2023.
Dino Daycare	Jeff King	October 2020	Production of the series was canceled in April 2022.
Ghee Happy	Sanjay Patel	October 2019	Became an independently produced YouTube series after being dropped by Netflix.
Inside Job - Season 2	Shion Takeuchi	June 2022	Canceled during pre-production in January 2023 shortly after Mike Moon's departure from Netflix Animation.
Kung-Fu Space Punch	Jorge R. Gutiérrez	—N/a	A follow-up miniseries to Maya and the Three. Production was canceled in May 2022.
Lupo the Butcher	Danny Antonucci	November 2020	Adult animated series. Canceled due to creative differences.
The Midnight Gospel - Season 2	Pendleton Ward; Duncan Trussell	—N/a	In June 2022, Ward announced that Netflix canceled the series after one season.
Pearl	Amanda Rynda	July 2021	Production of the series was canceled in May 2022.
Raise the Bar!	Fernanda Frick	June 2018	Netflix dropped development of the series back in early 2020. It is being adapted into a graphic novel instead.
Toil & Trouble	Lauren Faust	—N/a	Canceled by Netflix during production in 2021. It was previously pitched to other outlets.
Wings of Fire	Dan Milano; Christa Starr; Justin Ridge	April 2021	Television series adaptation based on the novel series of the same name by Tui Sutherland. Production was canceled in May 2022. Project revived at Amazon Prime Video with a different creative team under Amazon MGM Studios.
