= The Willoughbys =

2020 film

- Official release poster
- Directed by: Kris Pearn
- Screenplay by: Kris Pearn; Mark Stanleigh
- Story by: Kris Pearn
- Based on: The Willoughbys by Lois Lowry
- Produced by: Brenda Gilbert; Luke Carroll
- Starring: Will Forte; Maya Rudolph; Alessia Cara; Terry Crews; Martin Short; Jane Krakowski; Seán Cullen; Ricky Gervais
- Cinematography: Sebastian Brodin
- Edited by: Fiona Toth; Ken Schretzmann
- Music by: Mark Mothersbaugh
- Production companies: Netflix Animation Studios; Bron Animation; Creative Wealth Media Finance
- Distributed by: Netflix
- Release date: April 22, 2020
- Running time: 90 minutes
- Countries: Canada; United States
- Language: English

The Willoughbys is a 2020 animated black comedy film directed by Kris Pearn and co-directed by Rob Lodermeier (in his feature directorial debut), from a screenplay written by Pearn and Mark Stanleigh. Based on the book of the same name by Lois Lowry, the film stars the voices of Will Forte, Maya Rudolph, Alessia Cara, Terry Crews, Martin Short, Jane Krakowski, Seán Cullen, and Ricky Gervais, who also narrates the film. The story follows four children trying to find new parents to replace their self-centered and neglectful ones.

The Willoughbys was released on April 22, 2020, with 37 million people viewing the movie. It received positive reviews for its animation, voice acting, humor, story, and soundtrack, as well as Cara's song, "I Choose". It has received six Annie Award nominations, including Best Animated Feature.

== Plot ==
A cat narrates a story about the Willoughby family siblings: Tim, Jane, and the twin brothers, both named Barnaby. The Willoughby family has a distinguished history, but the children's parents are only focused on each other. They have little regard for their children and deprive them of love, food, and music. Tim yearns for the glory and happiness that once characterized his family.

Jane discovers an infant on the doorstep of the family house. She brings her inside despite Tim's warnings, and she wreaks havoc. The Willoughby adults throw their kids out of the house, forbidding them to return until they get rid of the new child. The children follow a rainbow to the doorstep of Mr. Melanoff's candy factory, and believing it to be a suitable home, name the baby Ruth and leave her there. On their way home, the siblings hatch a plan to improve their lives by getting rid of their parents. The siblings put together a vacation brochure full of deadly places that could kill their parents and turn them into orphans.

Their parents are excited by the brochure and leave immediately. Tim tries to take care of his siblings alone, but flounders until the nanny named Linda, hired by their mom and dad, arrives. Linda proves to be much warmer, happier, and more caring than the Willoughby parents, and Jane and the Barnabys warm up to her almost immediately; Tim, however, remains distrustful. When Linda learns about Ruth, she rushes to the candy factory with the children in tow. Melanoff explains that he originally intended to hand the baby over to the Department of Orphan Services but grew attached to her; Linda is assured that Ruth will be well cared for in the factory.

Meanwhile, the parents have survived seven deadly destinations but soon discover that they're out of money. Unwilling to return home, they decide to sell their house to further finance their vacation. They tell Linda by voice message, and Linda assures them she will take care of the children. Tim gets Linda's cell phone and finds the voice messages. He mistakenly assumes Linda means to dispose of the children, and secretly calls Orphan Services to report her.

The Willoughby adults hire a realtor to sell the house to potential buyers, but the children scare off all but one family. Linda scares the last family off for them. Tim finally realizes how much Linda cares. However, Orphan Services arrive in response to Tim's call. Heartbroken by Tim's betrayal, Linda leaves in tears, and the Willoughby siblings are forcibly taken away and placed in separate foster homes until their parents return. Tim repeatedly runs away from his well-meaning foster families and runs to the Willoughby home just in time to watch its demolition. Orphan Services decides to detain him in a cell at their Headquarters.

The cat finally intervenes by giving Tim's helmet to Linda. She decides to reunite the children. Disguised as a janitor, Linda sneaks into Tim's cell, reconciles with him, and breaks him out with the helpers in pursuit. Linda then retrieves and reunites the other Willoughby children.

The children decide to go back to their parents so that Orphan Services will leave them alone. With the help of Linda, Ruth, and Melanoff, the Willoughbys build a dirigible to rescue them from the "Unclimbable Alps" in Switzerland (shown and pronounced as Sveetzerlünd), which is the final and deadliest destination on their parents' trip. The siblings decide to take the dirigible and leave the adults and Ruth behind. As they reach their destination, they follow a trail of their mother's yarn to the top of the mountain, where they find their parents nearly frozen to death. The siblings and the cat save them. The children admit that they sent their parents away but hope to reunite as a family. However, the parents, who are as mean as ever, steal the dirigible and abandon the children. Unfortunately, Mr. and Mrs. Willoughby do not know how to steer the dirigible, resulting in a crash into a large oceanic bay.

The siblings begin to freeze to death, and with no way back down, Jane sings for her siblings, which momentarily warms them all up. Thankfully, Ruth, Melanoff, and Linda followed the dirigible and heard Jane's song, finding the siblings just in time. Now officially orphaned, the Willoughbys are adopted by Linda and Melanoff, living much happier lives together with Ruth and the cat at Melanoff's candy factory. Meanwhile, Mr. and Mrs. Willoughby survive the crash and become stranded at the ocean, where they are eaten by a Great white shark.

== Voice cast ==
- Will Forte as Tim Willoughby, the main protagonist of the film who is the oldest and rational son of the Willoughbys.
- Maya Rudolph as Linda a.k.a. The Nanny, an eccentric babysitter who looks after the kids. She is also revealed to be an orphan herself.
- Alessia Cara as Jane Willoughby, the cheerful middle child of the Willoughbys with a passion for singing.
- Terry Crews as Commander Melanoff, the joyous, but lonely owner of a candy factory.
- Martin Short as Walter "Father" Willoughby, the Willoughbys' extremely neglectful father with a hobby of ships in bottles.
- Jane Krakowski as Helga "Mother" Willoughby, the Willoughbys' extremely neglectful mother with a hobby of knitting.
- Seán Cullen as Barnaby A and Barnaby B Willoughby, the "creepy" twin boys and youngest children of the Willoughbys with a shared passion for inventing.
- Ricky Gervais as The Cat, a talking blue tabby cat and the narrator of the film.
- Colleen Wheeler as Orphan Service Agent Alice Vernakov, the lead agent for the Department of Orphan Services.
- Nancy Robertson as Irene Holmes, a greedy real-estate agent.
- Kris Pearn as Spoons McGee

== Production ==
In November 2015, Bron Studios acquired the animated film rights to Lois Lowry's book The Willoughbys, and hired Kris Pearn to adapt it into a screenplay with Adam Wood to direct the film, with Aaron L. Gilbert and Luke Carroll producing. In April 2017, Ricky Gervais was cast in the film to play the narrator as well as one of the characters and it was reported that Pearn would co-direct the film with Cory Evans. The screenplay however was rewritten by Pearn and Mark Stanleigh with a story by Pearn who also executive produced the film. In June 2017, the cast was expanded to include, Terry Crews, Maya Rudolph, Martin Short, Jane Krakowski, and Seán Cullen. Will Forte and Alessia Cara (in her film debut) also provided their voices, with Netflix set to distribute the film.

=== Animation ===
The film's animation was produced at Bron Animation studios in Burnaby with characters being designed by Craig Kellman and Wesley Mandell being the animation supervisor. FX lead Helén Ahlberg created graphic compositions to carry the “once upon a time” tone that combines heightened textures, simple camera, lack of motion blur, and a strong depth of field to the film's stop motion-like style alongside the squash and stretch principles done by Maya's SyncSketch tool.

== Soundtrack ==
The music in the film was composed by Mark Mothersbaugh, who previously worked with Pearn on Cloudy with a Chance of Meatballs 2. The original song "I Choose" (performed by Alessia Cara, who plays the voice of Jane in the film) was released independently by Def Jam Recordings.

== Release ==
The film was digitally released on April 22, 2020, by Netflix. It was viewed at least in-part by 37 million households over its first month of release.

== Reception ==
=== Critical response ===
On the review aggregation website Rotten Tomatoes, the film has an approval rating of 91% based on 64 reviews, with an average rating of 6.8/10. The site's critical consensus reads: "An appealing animated adventure whose silliness is anchored in genuine emotion, The Willoughbys offers fanciful fun the entire family can enjoy." On Metacritic the film has a weighted average score of 68 out of 100, based on 14 critics, indicating a "generally favorable reviews".

Renee Schonfeld of Common Sense Media, gave the film four stars out of five, noting that the film is a "wonderfully whimsical tale with dark themes [that] is softened by warmth, humor, and stellar performances by talented comic actors who brighten the already inventive and luminous animation." The Hollywood Reporter's David Rooney said that "the Netflix animated family comedy-adventure has an oddball charm that works surprisingly well." Natalia Winkelman of The New York Times said that the film "is charming on a moment-to-moment basis. Running gags, like how the nanny triggers a car pileup whenever she crosses the street, help to round out an unruly world. The composer Mark Mothersbaugh contributes a jazzy score and original song (performed by Cara) that punctuate the giddy mood. Though it tends to feel disjointed as a whole, 'The Willoughbys' thrives when it embraces its grim plot and lets mischief reign."

=== Accolades ===
Award	Date of ceremony	Category	Recipient(s)	Result	Ref.
Critics' Choice Super Awards	January 10, 2021	Best Animated Movie	The Willoughbys	Nominated	
Critics' Choice Super Awards	January 10, 2021	Best Voice Actor In An Animated Movie	Will Forte	Nominated	
Critics' Choice Super Awards	January 10, 2021	Best Voice Actor In An Animated Movie	Martin Short	Nominated	
Critics' Choice Super Awards	January 10, 2021	Best Voice Actor In An Animated Movie	Terry Crews	Nominated	
Critics' Choice Super Awards	January 10, 2021	Best Voice Actress In An Animated Movie	Maya Rudolph	Nominated	
Critics' Choice Super Awards	January 10, 2021	Best Villain in a Movie	Martin Short and Jane Krakowski	Nominated	
Visual Effects Society Awards	April 6, 2021	Outstanding Effects Simulations in an Animated Feature	Helén Ahlberg, Kyle McQueen, Russell Smith, Raehyeon Kim	Nominated	
Annie Awards	April 16, 2021	Best Animated Feature	Kris Pearn	Nominated	
Annie Awards	April 16, 2021	Editorial in an Animated Feature Production	Catherine Apple, Anna Wolitzky and Dave Suther	Nominated	
Annie Awards	April 16, 2021	Outstanding Achievement for Character Animation in an Animated Feature Production	Andrés Bedate Martin	Nominated	
Annie Awards	April 16, 2021	Outstanding Achievement for Music in an Animated Feature Production	Mark Mothersbaugh, Alessia Cara, Jon Levine, Colton Fisher	Nominated	
Annie Awards	April 16, 2021	Outstanding Achievement for Character Design in an Animated Feature Production	Craig Kellman	Nominated	
Annie Awards	April 16, 2021	Outstanding Achievement for Production Design in an Animated Feature Production	Kyle McQueen	Nominated	
