= Chinese International School =

Private, international school in Hong Kong

- 漢基國際學校
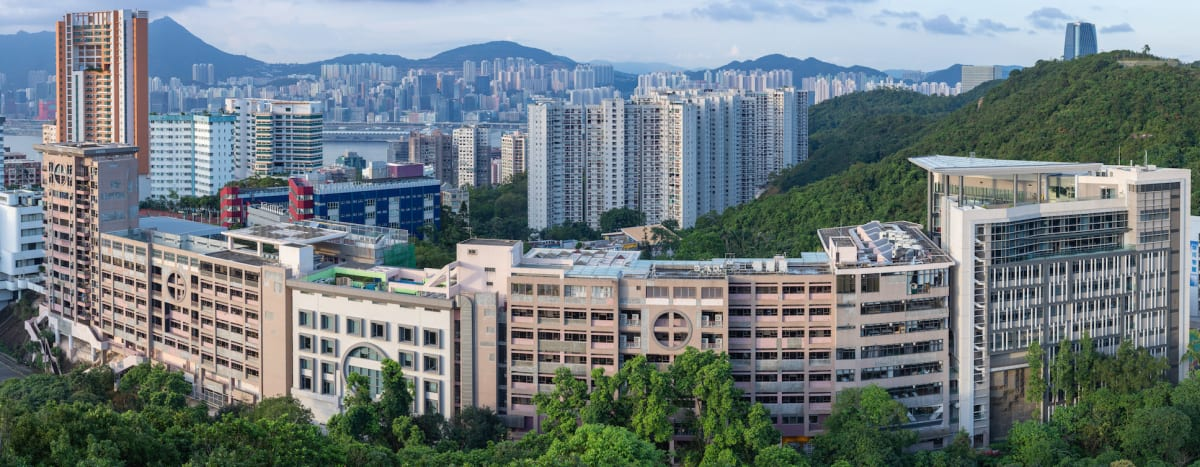

Location
- 1 Hau Yuen Path; Braemar Hill, North Point; Hong Kong; 22°17′2.91″N 114°11′50.94″E

Information
- Type: Reception-Year 13 (ages 4–18), private, international, mixed-sex
- Motto: To Seek And To Serve
- Established: 1983
- School district: Eastern
- Headmaster: Sean Lynch (from August 2018–present)
- Grades: Reception (= UK Kindergarten, or US pre-K) - 13 (= UK A-Levels, or US Grade 12)
- Enrollment: 1,660+
- Colours: Maroon and Gold
- Mascot: Phoenix
- Website: www.cis.edu.hk

Chinese International School
- Traditional Chinese: 漢基國際學校
- Simplified Chinese: 汉基国际学校
Transcriptions
Standard Mandarin
- Hanyu Pinyin: Hàn Jī Guójì Xuéxiào
Yue: Cantonese
- Jyutping: hon3 gei1 gwok3 zai3 hok6 haau6

Chinese International School is a private international school in Eastern District, Hong Kong. It offers a dual-language English–Mandarin programme from Reception to Year 13, the International Baccalaureate Middle Years Programme (MYP) and Diploma Programme (DP), and a mandatory Year 10 residential programme in Hangzhou, China.

== History ==
The school opened in 1983, with an initial intake of approximately 75 students in Years 1 to 3. Its first location was at 7 Eastern Hospital Road in Causeway Bay.

In 1986 and 1989, the school expanded to additional sites at 10 Borrett Road and 26 Kennedy Road. In 1991, the school moved to the current campus on Braemar Hill.

In 2013, the school opened Hangzhou CIS, a one-year residential programme for Year 10 students hosted at Greentown Yuhua School, focused on China immersion, character, challenge, and community.

In 2016–17, the school completed a campus redevelopment ("Phoenix Soaring"), adding an approximately 11-storey academic building with sports centres, laboratories, design studios, collaborative learning spaces, and sustainability features.

In 2024, an adjacent site at 9 Hau Yuen Path (formerly the Hong Kong Japanese School) was allocated for CIS's primary expansion; the project is planned to open in August 2028 to house Years 2–6 and expand capacity.

== Academics ==
=== Student body ===
The student body numbers over 1,660 students across Primary and Secondary in Hong Kong and Year 10 in Hangzhou; the school employs over 400 staff across educational and operational roles.

=== Curriculum ===
CIS introduced the IB Diploma Programme in 1992 and the IB Middle Years Programme in 2002; Years 10–11 follow a school-developed bridging programme prior to the IBDP.

In the 2025 IB Diploma Programme examinations, CIS students achieved an average score of 38.95 out of 45 points, with a 99% pass rate and 49% of students scoring 40 or above. In 2024, the average was 39.7 out of 45 points with 63% of students scoring 40 or above, and a 98.4% pass rate.

=== Admissions ===
CIS's main intake years are Reception and Year 7; approximately 96 Reception places and about 58 Year 7 places are offered annually.

== School management ==
=== Administration ===
The school is overseen by a Board of Governors with approximately fifteen members. The Board has been chaired by Andrew Brandler, a parent of the school. Theodore S. Faunce served as Headmaster from 2006 to 2017. Deputy Head of School Li Bin served as Interim Head of School in 2017–18. In August 2018, Sean Lynch was appointed Head of School.

CIS was re-accredited by the Council of International Schools (CIS) in 2021 and is a member of the Association of China and Mongolia International Schools.

=== Campus and facilities ===
The Braemar Hill campus includes an 11-storey academic building (Phoenix Soaring) with two multi-purpose sports centres, laboratories, design studios, flexible classrooms, and collaborative spaces. Facilities are designed around three courtyards with views of Victoria Harbour.

Chinese International School's Hangzhou campus provides academic and residential facilities for the Year 10 cohort, integrated with Greentown Yuhua School.

== As a filming location ==
The school's Braemar Hill campus served as a primary filming location for Fight Back to School II (1992), the second installment in Stephen Chow's Fight Back to School film trilogy.

== Notable alumni ==
- Lau Ka Kiu - Lee Man and Hong Kong national football team representative.
- Lucas Sin - Chef and restaurant entrepreneur.
- Isabella Wei - Hong Kong actress and dancer, cast most notably in Netflix television show Bridgerton as Posy Li.
- Audrey King - Hong Kong alpine skier who represented the territory at the 2022 Winter Olympics in Beijing.
- Alex Woo - former Pixar animator and current CEO of Kuku Studios, creator of Emmy Award-winning animated series Go! Go! Cory Carson.
- Tina Leung - Fashion stylist and content creator.

== See also ==
- List of international schools
