= Plastic Wax =

Australian animation studio

Plastic Wax Studios
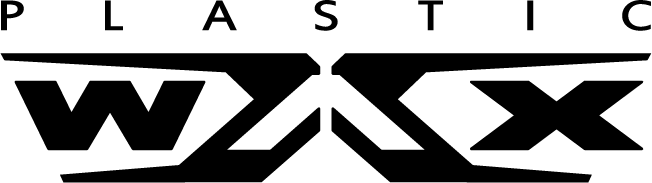
- Industry: Visual effects, CGI animation, Motion pictures, cinematography, cutscene, animated movies
- Founded: 1997; 29 years ago
- Headquarters: Sydney, Australia
- Website: plasticwax.com

Plastic Wax is an Australian animation and visual effects studio specializing in pre-rendered CG for video games, film and television.

Based in Sydney, Australia and established in 1997; Plastic Wax has produced a wide range of award-winning animation content. Some notable works are Injustice 2, Hitman 2, Evil Within II, Game of Thrones Conquest, Gears of War Ultimate Edition, Lego Star Wars: The Force Awakens, Transformers: Revenge of the Fallen, Tomb Raider, Civilization VI, Fallout: New Vegas, and Battle Kitty.

== Projects of note ==
Year	Brand/Title	Agency
1999	A Day With The Wiggles	Dataworks
1999	Fun With The Wiggles	Dataworks
2000	Wiggly Circus	Dataworks
2000	More Fun With The Wiggles	Dataworks
2001	Wiggly Party	Dataworks
2001	Ultima Online: Third Dawn	EA Games
2001	Hi-5: Fun And Games	Kids Like Us and Nine Films and Television
2001	Hi-5: Activity Create	Kids Like Us and Nine Films and Television
2002	Hi-5: Create, Paint and Play	Kids Like Us and Nine Films and Television
2003	Robin Hood: Defender of the Crown	Capcom
2003	Backyard Wrestling: Don't Try This at Home	Eidos
2003	The Wiggles: Space Dancing	
2003	Hi-5: Let's Play	Kids Like Us and Nine Films and Television
2003	Broken Sword: The Sleeping Dragon	THQ
2004	Hi-5: Fun and Games	Kids Like Us and Nine Films and Television
2004	Hi-5: Fun Club	Kids Like Us and Nine Films and Television
2004	Crash 'n' Burn	EIDOS
2004	King Arthur	Konami
2005	Hitman: Contracts	Eidos
2005	Constantine	Warner Bros. Interactive Entertainment
2005	Juiced	THQ
2006	Justice League Heroes	WB Games
2006	Hitman: Blood Money	Eidos
2006	Full Auto	SEGA
2007	The Darkness	2K Games
2007	Ghost Rider	2K Games
2007	Tomb Raider: Anniversary	Eidos
2007	S.T.A.L.K.E.R.: Shadow of Chernobyl	GSC
2007	BECKS Beer TVC	BECKS
2008	BioShock	2K Games
2008	Warhammer 40,000: Dawn of War II	Relic
2008	S.T.A.L.K.E.R.: Clear Sky	GSC
2008	Ultimate Band	Disney
2009	Silent Hill: Shattered Memories	Konami
2009	Borderlands	2K Games
2009	Ghostbusters: The Video Game	ATARI
2009	NBA 2K9	2K Games
2009	Transformers: Revenge of the Fallen	Activision
2010	Fallout: New Vegas	Bethesda
2010	Mafia II	2k Games
2010	Real Racing 2	Firemint
2010	Green Lantern: Rise of the Manhunters	WB
2010	Disney Epic Mickey	Disney
2011	Rift	Trion Worlds
2011	Warhammer 40,000: Dawn of War II – Retribution	Relic
2011	Warhammer: Kill Team	THQ
2011	Discovery Channel TVC	Discovery channel
2012	VW GTI Launch Campaign	Volkswagen
2012	Civilization V: Gods & Kings	2K Games
2012	Edge of Twilight	fuzzyeyes
2012	Saints Row: The Third	Volition
2012	Darksiders II	Vigil Games
2012	Disney Epic Mickey 2: The Power Of Two	Disney
2012	Inversion	Namco
2012	Civilization V: Brave New World	2k Games
2012	Xbox Launch Commercial	mccann erickson
2012	BioShock Infinite	Irrational Games
2012	The Hunger Games: Catching Fire	FUELVFX
2012	Saints Row IV	Volition
2013	Lost Planet 3	SEGA
2013	Lego Marvel Super Heroes	WB Games
2013	Neverwinter	Perfect World
2013	Little Big Planet	Sony
2013	War Commander/Vega/Battle Pirates	KIXEYE
2013	Skylanders: Giants	Activision
2013	Lego Batman 3: Beyond Gotham	WB Games
2013	Infinite Crisis (video game)	WB Games
2013	Warhammer 40,000: Regicide	Hammerfall Publishing
2014	D&D Tyranny of Dragons	Wizards of the Coast
2014	LEGO Jurassic Park	WB Games
2015	Magic The Gathering	Wizards of the Coast
2015	Lego Dimensions	WB Games
2015	Dirty Bomb	Splash Damage
2015	Gears of War: Ultimate Edition	Epic Games
2015	Homefront: The Revolution	Deep Silver
2016	Lego Star Wars: The Force Awakens	Warner Brothers
2016	Injustice 2	Warner Brothers
2016	Ghost in the Shell: Stand Alone Complex - First Assault Online	Nexon
2016	Underworld Awakening 4D - Motiongate Dubai	BOSA
2016	Civilization VI	2k Games
2016	Dead by Daylight	Starbreeze
2016	Elder Scrolls Legends	Hammer Creative
2017	Lego Marvel Super Heroes 2	Hammer Creative
2017	The Evil Within 2	Petrol Advertising
2017	Civilization VI: Rise & Fall	2k Games
2017	Game of Thrones: Conquest	WB Games
2018	Harry Potter: Hogwarts Mystery	Hammer Creative
2018	Lego Incredibles 2	Hammer Creative
2018	Hitman 2	WB Games
2018	Neverwinter: Ravenloft	Perfect World Entertainment
2021	Hitman III	IO Interactive
2022	Battle Kitty	Netflix Animation

== Awards ==
Accolades received by Inception
Year	Award	Category/Result	Nominee(s)	Ref.
2009	AEAF Awards	Gold - Game Cinematics	Warhammer 40,000: Dawn of War II	
2009	AEAF Awards	Gold - Game Cinematics	Transformers: Revenge of the Fallen	
2010	OMNI Awards	Silver - Animation	Civilization V: Brave New World	
2010	AEAF Awards	Gold - Game Cinematics	Civilization V: Brave New World	
2011	E3 EXPO	First Place, Game Trailer	Saints Row: The Third	
2013	OMNI Awards	Silver - Animation	Epic Mickey 2: The Power of Two	
2013	OMNI Awards	Silver - Animation	Neverwinter	
2013	AEAF Awards	Gold - Came Cinematics	Epic Mickey 2: The Power of Two	
2013	MARCOM Awards	Platinum - Game Cinematics	Neverwinter	
2013	MARCOM Awards	Gold - Commercial Animation	Lego Marvel Super Heroes	
2014	Australian Export Awards	Finalist - Creative Industries Award	Plastic Wax	
2014	MARCOM Awards	Platinum - Animation	Infinite Crisis	
2014	MARCOM Awards	Gold - Animation	Lego Batman 3: Beyond Gotham	
2014	PromaxBDA Awards	Gold - CG Animation	Lego Batman 3: Beyond Gotham	
2015	Annie Awards	Nomination	Lego Batman 3: Beyond Gotham	
2015	TELLY AWARD	WINNER	Civilization V: Brave New World	
2015	TELLY AWARD	WINNER	Neverwinter	
2015	Communicator Award	Gold - Animation	Civilization V: Brave New World	
2015	Communicator Award	Silver - Animation	Lego Marvel Super Heroes	
2015	Communicator Award	Silver - Animation	Neverwinter	
2015	SIA Summit Creative Awards	Bronze - 3D Animation	Infinite Crisis	
2015	AEAF Awards	Silver - Game Cinematics	Dirty Bomb	
2015	AEAF Awards	Special Merit - Game Cinematics	Warhammer 40,000: Regicide - Campaign Opening	
2015	PromaxBDA Awards	Gold - CG Animation	Lego Dimensions - Announcement Trailer	
2015	Australian Export Awards	NSW Winner - Creative Industries Award	Plastic Wax	
2016	New York Festivals	Finalist - Animation	Lego Star Wars: The Force Awakens - Announcement Trailer	
2016	PromaxBDA Global Excellence Promotion, Marketing and Design Awards	Gold - Animation	Lego Star Wars: The Force Awakens - Announcement Trailer	
2016	Bass Awards	Silver - Best Commercial	Lego Star Wars: The Force Awakens - Announcement Trailer	
2016	AEAF Awards	Bronze - Game Trailers	Lego Star Wars: The Force Awakens - Announcement Trailer	
2016	AEAF Awards	Silver - Game Trailers	Injustice 2 - Announcement Trailer	
2016	Golden Trailer Awards	Nomination - Best Video Game Trailer	Lego Star Wars: The Force Awakens - Announcement Trailer	

== See also ==
- List of film production companies
- List of television production companies
