= Pashmina (disambiguation) =

Pashmina is the fine variant of spun cashmere wool.

Pashmina may also refer to:

- Changthangi goat or Ladakh Pashmina, the source of pashmina wool
- Pashmina shawl, a variant of the Kashmir shawl
- Pashmina (graphic novel), a 2017 novel by Nidhi Chanani
- Pashminna – Dhaage Mohabbat Ke, a 2023 Indian television series
