= Henchmen (film) =

2016 film by Adam Wood

- Theatrical release poster
- Directed by: Adam Wood
- Written by: Adam Wood
- Story by: Jay D. Waxman; David Ray
- Based on: Henchmen: Ill Suited by Adam Wood
- Produced by: Brenda Gilbert; Luke Carroll; Aaron L. Gilbert
- Starring: Thomas Middleditch; James Marsden; Rosario Dawson; Alfred Molina; Will Sasso; Nathan Fillion; Rob Riggle; Jane Krakowski; Craig Robinson; Bobcat Goldthwait
- Cinematography: Rav Grewal
- Edited by: Jordan Hemsley
- Music by: Toby Chu
- Production company: Bron Studios
- Distributed by: Entertainment One
- Release date: December 7, 2018 (Canada)
- Running time: 89 minutes
- Country: Canada
- Language: English
- Box office: $90,717

Henchmen is a 2018 Canadian animated action comedy film written and directed by Adam Wood, based on his own 2014 short film Henchmen: Ill Suited. The film stars Thomas Middleditch as a henchman-in-training, James Marsden as his mentor, Rosario Dawson as a scientist, and Alfred Molina as the super villain. Production began in May 2015 in British Columbia.

Produced by Bron Studios, the film was originally planned to be released in 2016, but ultimately received a limited release in Canada on December 7, 2018, by Entertainment One. In the United States, it was released on digital platforms on October 9, 2020, by Vertical Entertainment.

== Premise ==
A fallen henchman named Hank leads a team of Lester and two others, called the "Union of Evil", who must prevent Baron Blackout from dominating the world. The crew are assigned to the Vault of Villainy, where Lester accidentally steals the ultimate weapon.

== Cast ==
- Thomas Middleditch as Lester
- James Marsden as Hank
- Rosario Dawson as Jolene
- Alfred Molina as Baron Blackout
- Will Sasso as The Gluttonator and Union Boss
- Nathan Fillion as Captain Superior
- Rob Riggle as Biff
- Jane Krakowski as Jane
- Craig Robinson as Stew
- Bobcat Goldthwait as Jackalope

== Production ==
The project was first announced on August 13, 2014, when Adam Wood's short film Henchmen: Ill Suited was released, with Gary Sanchez Productions (owned by Adam McKay, Will Ferrell and Chris Henchy) attached to executive produce the film for Bron Studios. Wood himself would write and direct the film. On May 29, 2015, the full voice cast was revealed, including James Marsden, Thomas Middleditch, Rosario Dawson, Alfred Molina, Nathan Fillion, Jane Krakowski, Rob Riggle, Craig Robinson and Will Sasso. At that time, it was also confirmed that production on the film had begun at Bron Studios in Burnaby and Duncan, British Columbia, and that Gary Sanchez Productions had left the project, replaced by Aaron L. Gilbert and Luke Carroll.
