= Lucas Sin =

Hong Kong chef

- Born: 1993 (age 32–33); Canada
- Education: Yale University (BA)
- Spouse: Camden Hauge

Lucas Sin is an American chef and food blogger. Sin is the host of Street Eats, a Bon Appétit show documenting global street food.

Born in Canada, Sin subsequently moved to California and Hong Kong, where he attended Chinese International School. He graduated from Yale University in 2015 with a Bachelor of Arts in cognitive science. He joined Junzi, a small Chinese restaurant chain based in Connecticut and New York, during his final semester at Yale. In 2020, Sin opened Nice Day, a pop-up serving Chinese-American cuisine, in Greenwich Village. He has since exited the restaurant group.

During the COVID-19 pandemic, Sin hosted a street-food series on YouTube for Bon Appétit and developed new restaurant concepts in response to industry disruptions. In 2020 he opened Nice Day, a Chinese-American pop-up restaurant in New York City, which aimed to reinterpret classic American Chinese dishes while addressing the economic challenges facing Chinese restaurants during the pandemic.

During this period, he also launched creative initiatives such as delivery tasting menus accompanied by online demonstrations and educational content about Chinese cuisine, partly intended to counter anti-Asian sentiment associated with the pandemic. Junzi Kitchen additionally provided meals to healthcare workers funded through donations.

Sin later described the pandemic period as influential in shaping his focus on Chinese culinary heritage and American Chinese cuisine, which informed subsequent projects including media work and research travel.

In 2024, Street Eats won the 2024 James Beard Foundation Broadcast Media Award.

== Publications ==
- Cha Chaan Teng: Comfort Food from Hong Kong's Iconic Diners (2026)
