= Dead End: Paranormal Park =

Science fantasy graphic novel and TV series

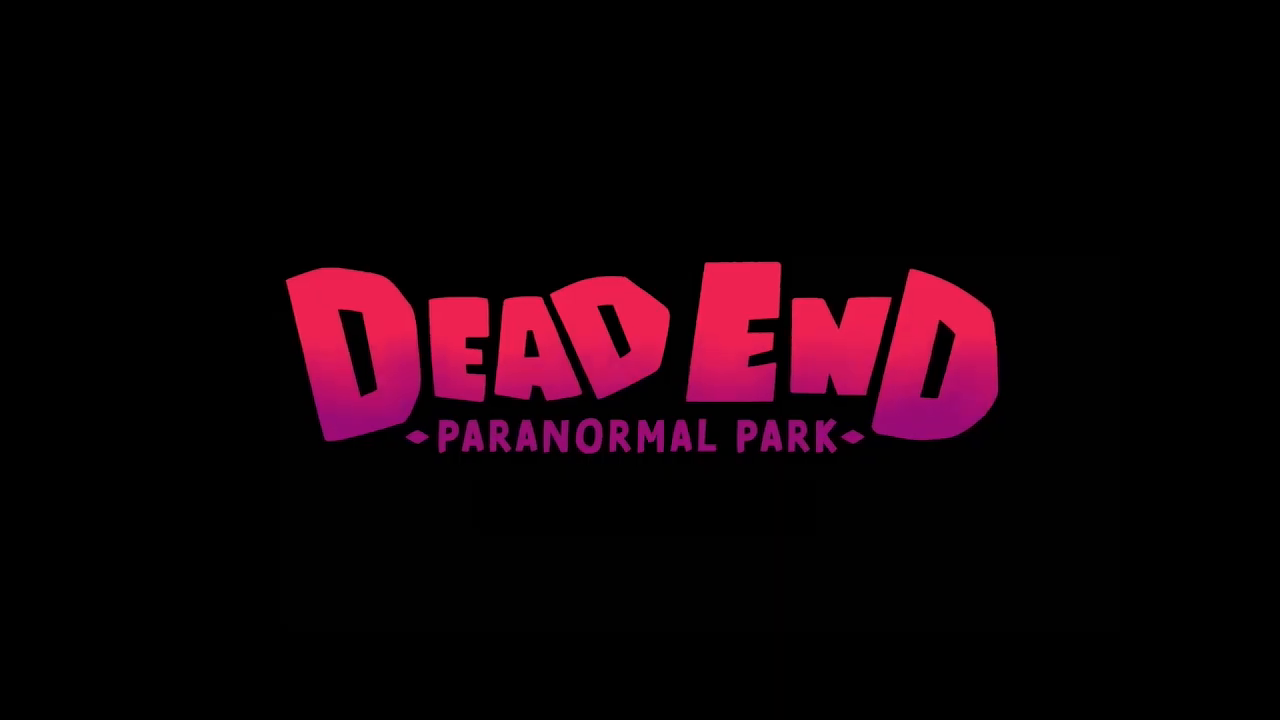
- Genre: Dark fantasy; Black comedy; Horror comedy; Supernatural
- Created by: Hamish Steele
- Based on: DeadEndia by Hamish Steele
- Directed by: Liz Whitaker
- Voices of: Zach Barack; Kody Kavitha; Alex Brightman; Emily Osment; Clinton Leupp; Kenny Tran; Kathreen Khavari
- Composer: Julian Guidetti
- Countries of origin: United Kingdom; United States
- Original language: English
- No. of seasons: 2
- No. of episodes: 20

Production
- Executive producers: Hamish Steele; James Stevenson Bretton; Tom Stuart
- Producer: Jen Coatsworth
- Editor: Joseph Rowe
- Running time: 26–31 minutes
- Production companies: Netflix Animation Studios; Blink Industries

Original release
- Network: Netflix
- Release: June 16 – October 13, 2022

Dead End: Paranormal Park is an animated horror comedy television series, based on the graphic novel DeadEndia: The Watcher's Test by Hamish Steele. The series premiered on June 16, 2022, on Netflix, and the second season premiered on October 13, 2022. In January 2023, Steele announced that the series had been canceled.

== Premise ==
The series follows Barney and Norma, the newest employees at their local theme park, Phoenix Parks, a Dollywood-esque park created by the famous celebrity Pauline Phoenix. Joined by Pugsley, Barney's childhood dog, and Courtney, a thousand-year-old demon, they discover the world of the Paranormal as well as learning new things about themselves.

== Plot ==
Barney Guttman is the main protagonist of the series. He is a gay transgender teen boy who finds a new job as a security guard of Phoenix Parks. Barney has family problems. His grandmother does not accept the fact that he is trans. While it has not been made clear what his grandmother said to him, it was shown to be very hurtful. Barney's parents accept him for who he is, but do nothing when his grandmother begins verbally abusing him.

Shortly after starting at his new job, Barney secretly moves in the Haunted House attraction with his dog, Pugsley. On the same day, Norma Khan is also starting her new job at Phoenix Parks as part of the security team. Norma is a 17-year-old autistic Pakistani-American girl who is obsessed with all things Pauline Phoenix. Norma is very socially anxious, dreading social interaction, and has been shown to have panic attacks when overwhelmed.

After walking to the haunted house and entering, they meet Courtney, a demon who disguises herself as part of the attraction. Courtney is taking orders from Temeluchus, a member of the demon royal family. Temeluchus needs a vessel to interact with the world and tasks Courtney to bring them Barney. After Barney's dog Pugsley realizes this, he jumps in front of Barney and ends up getting possessed instead of Barney. He flies to an attraction in Camelot Creek to claim a throne.

Barney's scared that Pugsley might get hurt, so he walks to the attraction. Norma follows him after doubting a bit. Norma gets an idea from an old Pauline Phoenix film where a demon soul is captured by taking a photograph. When they both arrive at Camelot Creek, Norma turns on the attraction and Barney hops in a boat for Temeluchus/Pugsley to follow, tempting the demon with his body as a vessel instead of his dogs. The plan works fine initially, but then Temeluchus realizes the duo's plan and turns the camera away from him using magic. Norma, struggling at first, succeeds in turning the camera back just in time. They capture the soul of Temeluchus in the photograph and head back to the haunted house.

When they get to the haunted house, Barney and Norma give the photograph to Courtney, who is sad because Temeluchus promised to return her to her home, but happy not to be taking any more orders. Courtney realizes that part of Temeluchus is missing from the photo. Pugsley still has a bit of Temeluchus inside him, and because of this he has gained the ability to talk, use magic and easily walk on two legs.

== Cast and characters ==
- Zach Barack as Barney Guttman, a 17-year-old gay and transgender Jewish American boy who runs away to the theme park because of his complicated relationship with his family.
- Kody Kavitha as Norma Khan, a 17-year-old autistic and bisexual Pakistani-American girl who gets a job at the park because of her adoration of the films made by character Pauline Phoenix.
- Alex Brightman as Pugsley, Barney's pug. As a result of being possessed by a demon king called Temeluchus, he can speak and possesses magical abilities.
  - Brightman also plays Temeluchus, The Watcher and Saul Guttman, Barney's father.
- Emily Osment as Courtney, a thousand-year-old demon. She has been banished from her home and hopes to find a way to return.
- Clinton Leupp as Pauline Phoenix, a famous actress who is the former owner of Phoenix Parks.
- Kenny Tran as Logan Nguyen, a health and safety officer at the park. He is a gay Vietnamese-American who develops feelings for Barney.
- Kathreen Khavari as Badyah Hassan, Norma's friendly and sardonic best friend. She is Iranian-American and Muslim.
- Michaela Jaé Rodriguez as Zagan, a vampiric demon, and Temeluchus' sister and fellow demon king
- Karen Maruyama as Barborah Winslow, one of Pauline Phoenix's former hosts and current owner of Phoenix Parks.
- Patrick Stump as Josh, a security guard at the park.
- Tucker Chandler as Patrick Guttman, Barney's supportive younger brother.
- Kaitlyn Robrock as Roxanne Guttman, Barney's mother.
- Natasha Chandel as Swati Khan, Norma's mother.
- Cee Nelson as Vince, one of Patrick's friends.
- Angelica Ross and Samantha Jayne as Margie and Marly, an old lesbian couple.
- Bill Farmer as Chester Phoenix, one of Pauline Phoenix's ex-husbands.
- Z Infante as Jules, a non-binary ghost.
- Kemah Bob as Henrietta, an orb ghost.
- Jamie Demetriou as Fingers, a serpentine angel resembling a giant arm sent from the fourth plane to watch over Pugsley.
- Taylor Gibson as Asmodeus, a demon wrestler.
- Haley Joel Osment as Danny, a fallen angel worker.
- Piotr Michael as Pael, the Head Angel of the fourth plane.

== Production, development, and release ==
On 17 August 2020, Steele explained how the show changed from its original iteration on Cartoon Hangover in 2014, and the graphic novels that followed it, stating that he is grateful for showrunners who fought for LGBTQ characters in their shows, adding that there was "absolutely no pushback from Netflix about representation", while describing Barney as a trans male character. He also hoped that the show will help out "more trans creators getting their chance to tell their stories" while hinting at other LGBTQ characters in the show apart from Barney. In another interview, he was thankful to Netflix executives for letting them have diversity in the show while pushing for it, and pushing him to "tell the story I want to tell". He stated that all the scripts were reviewed by GLAAD and said he could not wait for people to know Barney. Jen Rudin was a casting executive for the show. Julian Guidetti is the show's composer, and features original songs written by Patrick Stump. In January 2023, he revealed that the series was pitched to Netflix in 2019, and that the series was not a "word-for-word adaptation" of the comics he had written.

The series was originally scheduled for a Fall 2021 premiere on Netflix. In August 2021, Steele noted the importance of trans representation in the series, hoped it took a stance against transphobia in the U.K., and noted there are "multiple trans cast and crew". On 23 October 2021, Netflix reserved a trademark with the new name for the series: "Dead End: Paranormal Park". On 19 May 2022, the show's trailer premiered and confirmed the show would premiere on 16 June 2022. Mey Rude of Out stated that the trailer gives a "great look at the show" and said that the show features queer and trans characters, addressing these identities "through important storylines". The first season premiered June 16, 2022.

In July 2022, after the show's release, Steele argued that the series was a young adult animation like Infinity Train and hoped for the expansion of the genre in the future. On 6 September 2022, a second season was confirmed to be released on October 13. On 13 January 2023, Steele announced that Netflix has cancelled the series. On 17 January 2023, Steele wrote a guest column in Gizmodo, saying that the cancellation meant that "the story cannot conclude on screen" and added that "politics of TV production" means that creators are "never guaranteed to end things on your terms", differentiating it from writing webcomics and graphic novels.

== Episodes ==
=== Series overview ===
Series overview
Season	Episodes	Originally released
1	10	June 16, 2022
2	10	October 13, 2022

=== Season 1 (2022) ===
No. overall	No. in season	Title	Written by	Storyboarded by	Original release date
1	1	"The Job"	Nicole Paglia & Hamish Steele	Adrian Maganza & Oliver Hamilton	June 16, 2022
Barney and Norma arrive at Phoenix Parks, an amusement park themed around film starlet Pauline Phoenix, to compete for a job at the park's haunted house. They soon find that the house is overrun by a group of demons led by Courtney, who explains they have actually been summoned to provide a human host for their king Temeluchus, in the hopes that he can return them to their world. Temeluchus attempts to possess Barney, but his dog Pugsley (who Barney had brought along with him) jumps in front of him and ends up being the host. Barney and Norma work together and take a picture of Pugsley, extracting Temeluchus from Pugsley and trapping him in a photograph. They give the photograph to Courtney and she offers both of them jobs as security guards for the park. Barney decides to stay the night in the haunted house. Courtney notices a part of Temeluchus's soul missing from the photograph, and Barney is surprised that Pugsley can speak now.
2	2	"The Tunnel"	Nicole Paglia & Elijah W. Harris	Max Loubaresse & James Lancett	June 16, 2022
Barney and Norma attend a mandatory employee initiation on a monorail tour. Barney accidentally leaves Pugsley on the train, bringing Pugsley to the underground section of the park. A new train arrives and a living mascot costume escapes from it and grabs an employee. Barney and Norma hide and look for Pugsley in the underground tunnels of the park. They find Pugsley leading more living mascot costumes to trains; before Pugsley can explain, they argue. The released mascots cause chaos to the guests in the park, until Norma realizes that the mascots are not evil but are trying to fulfill their roles as mascots by meeting with guests. Barney apologizes to Pugsley and they lead a mascot parade before returning them underground. Norma asks Barney why he is sleeping over in the park, to which he explains that he is transgender and the park gives him an opportunity to make a fresh start. Courtney deduces that the part of Temeluchus's soul missing from the photograph is in Pugsley.
3	3	"Trust Me"	Furquan Akhtar	Eva Figueroa Lopez & Toby Parry	June 16, 2022
Barney and Norma attend a team-building exercise with their employees in an event hosted a man named Harmony (Alan Cumming). Norma is anxious meeting new people and has a panic attack during one of the exercises. In a final exercise, Harmony instructs everyone to touch a skull, trapping them in the world with their greatest fear. Barney and Norma touch the skull together and she breaks Barney out of his fear world (a dinner with his parents and a monstrous version of his grandmother), doing the same for Pugsley and Courtney. Harmony reveals that he is actually a demon called Harm Many that feeds on people's fears. As Norma had not been to her fear world yet, she challenges Harm Many that if she enters her fear world, he must free the others. Her fear world is revealed to be an intense recreation of her social anxiety, and her friends help break her out. Her fears are so great they end up killing Harm Many. Norma tells her friends she is grateful for them. Pugsley discovers he has magical powers like Temeluchus.
4	4	"Night of the Living Kids"	Jen Bardekoff	Krystal Georgiou & Dan Hamman	June 16, 2022
Barney and Norma are hired to supervise a group of children for a sleepover party in the park. Barney is surprised to see his little brother Patrick at the party as he had not seen him since he ran away. Courtney helps the children summon the Night Hag (Kaitlyn Robrock), an evil creature from an old Pauline Phoenix movie. The Night Hag causes the children to become manic and attack the other children, bringing them under her spell. Everyone besides Pugsley and Courtney eventually falls victim to the Night Hag. Courtney instructs Pugsley through summoning the Day Hag with his powers and they defeat the Night Hag. Patrick asks Barney to say hi to his parents so they know he is okay, but he does not after hearing an insulting comment towards him. Courtney uses Pugsley's powers to open the elevator that will bring her back to her home, but is saddened to discover she cannot enter it.
5	5	"The Nightmare Before Christmas in July"	Mia Resella	Oliver Hamilton & James Lancett	June 16, 2022
Courtney is homesick over not being able to return home. Barney, Norma, and Pugsley decide to visit the Demon World and win a gameshow for Courtney to cheer her up. The host (Tom Lenk) gives them three impossible rounds designed to kill them. They pass the first two with Pugsley's magical powers and clever thinking. They are close to being killed in the third challenge, but the host quickly declares them winners when he realizes that a part of Temeluchus is inside Pugsley, and it is not allowed to kill a part of the Demonic royal family. They bring home the prize of a cheap mug to Courtney and she loves it. A demon declares that she will pay "big brother" Temeluchus a visit.
6	6	"Wait Time: 22 Minutes"	Brydie Lee-Kennedy	Althea Aseoche & Bianca Ansems	June 16, 2022
Barney and Norma are excited to test the new attraction in the park. Barney ends up paired with fellow employee Logs, who he has feelings for, while Norma is stuck with Pugsley and Courtney. Barney asks Pugsley to put a spell over him to give him confidence to talk to Logs. Pugsley casts a possession spell over Barney to let Pugsley, Courtney, and Norma control him. This causes Barney to be stuck in the In-between, a world for people whose bodies are being possessed by someone else. Norma travels to the In-between to rescue Barney but also finds Jennifer Swan, a Pauline Phoenix impersonator who disappeared mysteriously. Barney admits that he was running away from his problems, but Norma convinces him and Jennifer to leave the In-between. Barney runs to say hi to his family.
7	7	"Norma Khan: Paranormal Detective"	Nicole Paglia	Eva Figueroa Lopez, Toby Parry & Max Loubaresse	June 16, 2022
Norma and Badyah investigate the case surrounding Jennifer Swan's disappearance. Norma believes Barborah Winslow (Karen Maruyama), a stunt double who had a grudge with Pauline, is responsible. They are surprised to learn that a string of Pauline impersonators have all disappeared at one point but still work for the park. Meanwhile, Barney has a tense conversation with his family. They ask him to return home, but he refuses since they did not defend him against his grandmother's transphobic comments. Barney and Norma head to the museum and finds Barborah disguised there as a custodian. She explains that she is looking for an insurance ad to prove who Pauline truly is. Pugsley uses his powers to show the ad on a TV, but the ghost of Pauline appears and tries to stop them. Barborah holds Pauline off as Barney, Norma, and Pugsley jump into the TV.
8	8	"The Pauline Phoenix Experience"	Brydie Lee-Kennedy	Krystal Georgiou & Dan Hamman	June 16, 2022
Barney, Norma, and Pugsley awake as characters in Pauline's old shows. Norma is reluctant to try to leave the shows, as she prefers being with the Pauline as a character she loved instead of what she is in real life. Barney convinces her that running away from her problems does not work as he had tried to do the same. They find the insurance ad; it shows Pauline accidentally dying on the shoot and then possessing Barbora, passing Barbora off as herself. They deduce that Pauline had been possessing a new impersonator when she finished with an old one in order to stay young forever, explaining the "disappearances" of the old impersonators. Courtney mocks Norma for being devastated that her hero was evil, causing Courtney to be outed from the group. Pauline's spirit promises Courtney that if she helps her find a new vessel, she will let Courtney return home.
9	9	"The Phantom of the Theme Park"	Hamish Steele & Jen Bardekoff	Eva Figueroa Lopez, Althea Aseoche & James Lancett	June 16, 2022
In a musical episode caused by a spell from Pugsley, Pauline organizes an audition to find an impersonator for her to possess. Norma uses Pugsley's powers to transform herself into a perfect replica of Pauline, and Pauline chooses her to be her new vessel. Courtney almost seals the spell, but Barney convinces her that she lied about being able to send Courtney back home. Courtney attacks Pauline for lying, but Pugsley stops her as she would hurt Norma who is inside. Temeluchus convinces Pugsley to give him full control so he can protect Norma, but Temeluchus instead continues his goal of conquering the world. His sister Zagan (Michaela Jaé Rodriguez) comes to the Earth and brings with her an army to support her brother. She helps Courtney return to her home. Barney and Norma (who was freed from Pauline's possession) promise to save the world and Pugsley, while Courtney returns home.
10	10	"Into the Fire"	Nicole Paglia	Toby Parry, Oliver Hamilton, Bianca Ansems & Eva Figueroa Lopez	June 16, 2022
Courtney is unsatisfied in her old home and realizes she misses her old friends. Pugsley fights back against Temeluchus's control. Zagan deems him unfit for rule and decides to take rule herself, after she had freed Temeluchus from Pugsley. Courtney returns and gives Pugsley the photograph with the rest of Temeluchus's soul, giving Temeluchus full power over Pugsley. Temeluchus defeats Zagan and sends her home. He tries to continue his mission but finds he cannot bring himself to kill Barney; Courtney explains that just like her, he had developed a fondness for humans. Temeluchus returns home and frees Pugsley and the people he trapped. Norma hugs Badyah, Barney kisses Logs and makes a compromise with his family, who promise to have his back from now on and make his grandmother realize her error. Pugsley tells Barney and Norma about Courtney's redemption and savior of Earth, with the devil herself appearing and apologizes for her actions and behavior upon realizing that she had everything during her time on earth as the group reconcile with her. The spirit of Pauline vows revenge before disappearing while an angel who watched everything and decides to call the boss from upstairs.

=== Season 2 (2022) ===
No. overall	No. in season	Title	Written by	Original release date
11	1	"Take the Angels Bowling"	Nicole Paglia	October 13, 2022
Barney and Norma take a break from guarding Dead End and head to the bowling alley—but it is invaded by a mysterious figure from the demon planes.
12	2	"Evil Twins Are People Too"	Jen Bardekoff	October 13, 2022
Fingers gives Pugsley magic lessons. Barney and Norma hang out with their evil twins, while Courtney's good twin hosts a support group for demons.
13	3	"The Trials of Barney"	Elijah W. Harris	October 13, 2022
Barney pursues his dream of becoming a wrestler and joins the Demon Wrestling Federation. Does he stand a chance against a burly demon king?
14	4	"Eat the Parents"	Furquan Akhtar	October 13, 2022
Barney's parents want to meet Logs, so Norma decides to plan the perfect dinner party. But it's filled with magical mishaps.
15	5	"The Ride of a Lifetime"	Brydie Lee-Kennedy	October 13, 2022
Pugsley's been having strange premonitions. He tries to protect his friends by manipulating time, but things go haywire on a Ferris wheel ride.
16	6	"My Super Sweet 1600"	Mia Resella	October 13, 2022
Fingers sends the friends to break up a demon party, but they have so much fun that they forget about their mission.
17	7	"All Dolled Up"	Jen Bardekoff	October 13, 2022
Norma confides in Logs—and wonders how to come out to her mom. But first, they must deal with an army of evil dolls.
18	8	"The Other Side"	Mia Resella	October 13, 2022
A chandelier crashes down on Barney's head. The friends race to get Barney's ghost back into his body before it is too late.
19	9	"Going Up"	Nicole Paglia & Divya Sachdeva-Malde	October 13, 2022
Norma, Barney and Courtney search for Pugsley on the fourth plane, where a mysterious ruler sentences them to an eternity in prison.
20	10	"The Watcher's Test"	Hamish Steele	October 13, 2022
While Norma, Courtney and Pugsley lead a daring escape, Barney confronts the Watcher and tries to change the future.

== Reception ==
The series was received positively. David Opie of Digital Spy argued that the series satiates the "endless need for adorable queer animation" and noting other animated series with queer-inclusive stories. Abbey White of The Hollywood Reporter said the series is not "typical" for animated series, noted the "racially-, gender- and sexuality-diverse cast" and argued the series smashes genres and is "equal parts comedy, horror and coming of age." Ben Mitchell, the editor-in-chief of Skwigly called the series a "horror comedy...for younger audiences" and praised the well-developed characters and "incredible attention to detail" in production design. Reuben Baron of Paste called the series "groundbreaking" and argued that U.S. senators Roger Marshall, Mike Lee, Mike Braun, Steve Daines, and Kevin Cramer demanded new content warnings because the series centers on a trans protagonist. Baron criticized the series for not capturing the "visual charm" of the DeadEndia comic and saying the series "tones down" some themes from the comic while praising the writing and treatment of autism in the series.

Jade King of TheGamer argued that the series is "delightfully queer" and said it comes together in a "warm, comforting, and spooky animated adventure". She also praised the show's character development and said the show should not be overlooked. Charles Pulliam-Moore of The Verge called the series a "shining example" of what queer creators can do "when given the resources and freedom to tell their own stories", said its existence is evident in the impact of "other recent progressively minded cartoons" on modern animation and hoped that Netflix renewed the series. Kristy Puchko of Mashable called it a "kinetic and heartwarming adventure cartoon" which delivers on LGBTQ representation and is true to the source material. Barry Levitt of The Daily Beast called the series a "incredibly fun journey" with bright and inviting "colors and charming character designs filling every frame" and said it is a "miracle" the series is coming out, with transphobic rhetoric on the rise.

In 2025, the show received renewed attention when Chaya Raichik posted a clip of the show on her Libs of TikTok Twitter page, where Barney says that he is transgender. Elon Musk responded to the video by urging his followers to "cancel Netflix for the health of your kids". Hamish Steele, the show's creator, stated on Bluesky that he received both "homophobic and antisemitic emails".
