= Zach Barack =

American actor (born 1995)

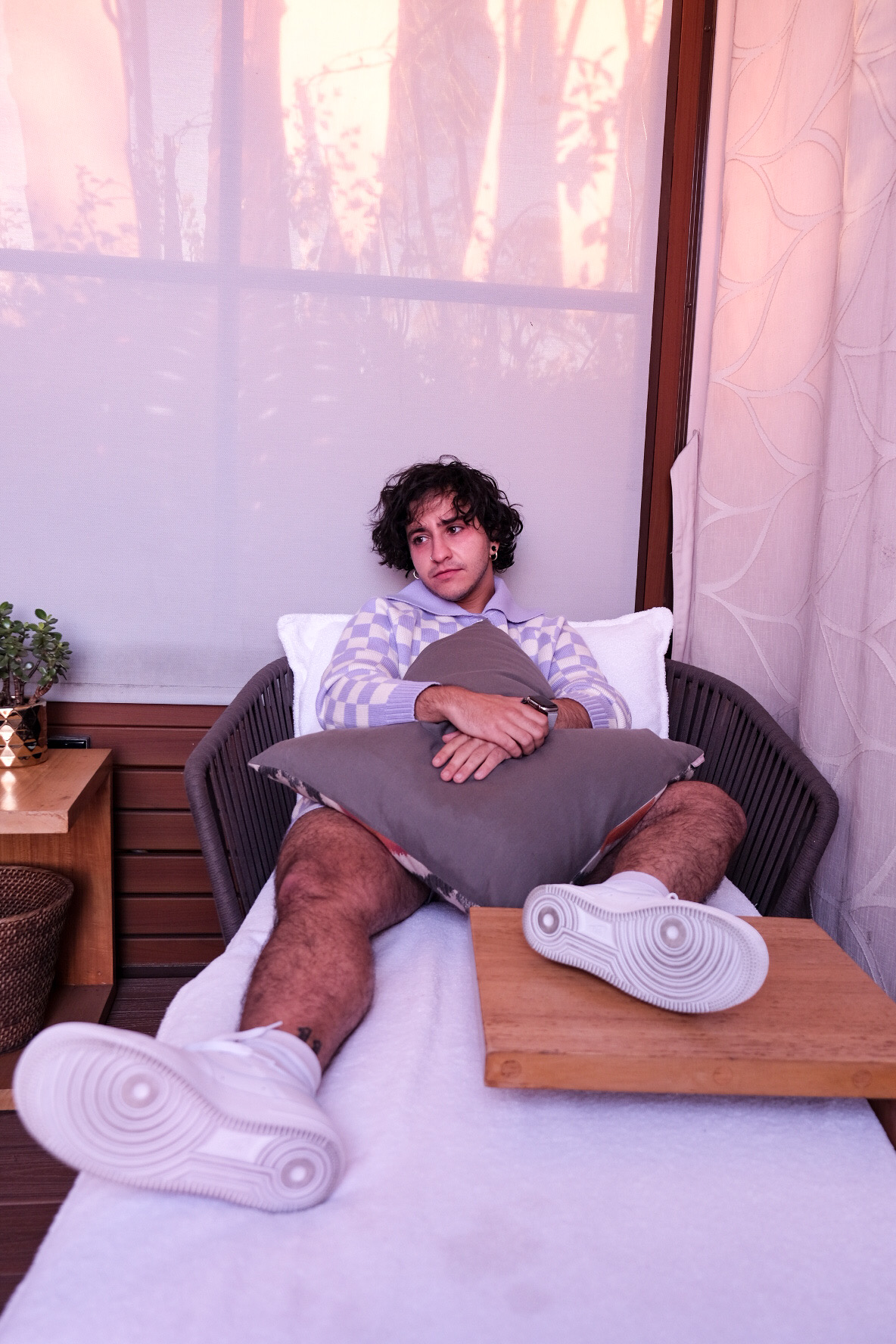
- Born: November 17, 1995 (age 30); Evanston, Illinois, U.S.
- Occupations: Actor; singer; comedian
- Years active: 2019–present

Zach Barack (born November 17, 1995) is an American actor, singer, and comedian. Barack voices the character Barney on Netflix's animated show, Dead End: Paranormal Park. He is known as the first openly transgender actor in a Marvel film, Spider-Man: Far From Home.

== Early and personal life ==
Barack was born in Evanston, Illinois and grew up in Glenview. He grew up Reform Jewish. He worked at a queer youth organization in Washington, D.C. and a cookie store after high school. Barack is transgender.

== Career ==
Barack appeared in episodes of Transparent and LA's Finest in 2019. He also appeared on Netflix's Dead End: Paranormal Park and Marvel's Spider-Man: Far From Home.

He writes music and performs as a stand-up comedian in Los Angeles.

== Filmography ==
=== Film ===
Year	Title	Role	Notes
2019	Spider-Man: Far From Home	Zach	
2024	And You Are?	Max	

=== Television ===
Year	Title	Role	Notes
2019	LA's Finest	Sam	2 episodes
2019	Transparent	Nico	Episode: Transparent Musicale Finale
2020	The College Tapes	Frankie Meeks	10 episodes
2022	Dead End: Paranormal Park	Barney Guttman (voice)	19 episodes
2023	Star Wars: Young Jedi Adventures	Bruff / Kundu Townsfolk 2 (voice)	Episode: The Girl and Her Gargantua/The Show Must Go On

=== Audiobooks ===
Year	Title	Author	Notes
2022	The Feeling of Falling in Love	Mason Deaver	
2022	Possess Me	K. R. Alexander	
2026	Piper at the Gates of Dusk	Patrick Ness	
