= Hamish Steele =

British animation director

Hamish Steele (born c. 1991) is an English animator, television writer and graphic novelist.

== Career ==
A graduate of Kingston University, Steele directed Dead End, an animated short for Frederator Studio's Cartoon Hangover, in 2014. This led to him directing two animated short films for Nickelodeon's International Shorts program. He simultaneously pursued a career in webcomics and graphic novels, publishing his first novel, Pantheon in 2014.

He also expanded his short film Dead End into the webcomic DeadEndia, which ran on Tapas from 2015 to 2018, but was then significantly revised for publication as a graphic novel DeadEndia: The Watcher's Test by Nobrow Press in 2018. In 2022, The Watcher's Test was partially adapted by Blink Industries and Netflix Animation as an animated fantasy horror comedy television series, Dead End: Paranormal Park, with Steele serving as showrunner and executive producer. The series received positive critical acclaim and several accolades, including the GLAAD Media Award for Outstanding Kids and Family Programming. Despite the cancellation of Paranormal Park after two seasons, the story of DeadEndia was continued in two sequel graphic novels, The Broken Halo (2019) and The Divine Order (2025).

== Personal life ==
Steele was diagnosed with autism in 2022, aged 31. He is gay and married his husband in 2011.

== Filmography ==
- Dead End (2014, short)
- Badly Drawn Animals (2015, short)
- The Tall Tales of Urchin (2016, short)
- Dead End: Paranormal Park (2022, two seasons, creator)

== Bibliography ==
=== Comics and graphic novels ===
- Pantheon (2014, republished 2018)
- DeadEndia trilogy
  - DeadEndia: The Watcher's Test (2018, republished 2023)
  - DeadEndia: The Broken Halo (2019, republished 2023)
  - DeadEndia: The Divine Order (2024)
- The Wicked + The Divine: The Funnies ("5 Things Everyone Who's Lived with Sakhmet Will Understand", written and drawn)
- Croc and Roll (2021, illustrated by George Williams)
- Go-Man: Champion of Earth (2025)

=== Audio dramas ===
- Bernice Summerfield Missing Persons 5.1: "Big Dig" (written 2013)
- Iris Wildthyme: Wildthyme Reloaded 5.5: "The Slots of Giza" (written 2015)

== Accolades ==
Accolades received by Warfare
Date	Award	Category	Recipient(s)	Result	Ref.
2018	Eisner Awards	Russ Manning Promising Newcomer Award	Hamish Steele (for Pantheon)	Won (tie)	
2019	American Library Association Rainbow Book List	Young Adult Fiction	Hamish Steele (for DeadEndia: The Watcher's Test)	Shortlisted	
2023	Dorian Awards	Best Animated Show	Dead End: Paranormal Park	Nominated	
2023	GLAAD Media Award	Outstanding Kids and Family Programming (Animated)	Dead End: Paranormal Park	Won	
