= Go! Go! Cory Carson =

Animated series by Kuku Studios, 2020–2021

- Also known as: Toot Toot Cory Carson (UK); Tut Tut Cory Bolides (France)
- Genre: Animated sitcom Children's television series
- Created by: Stanley Moore; Alex Woo
- Based on: "Go! Go! Smart Wheels" toy line by VTech
- Directed by: Stanley Moore; Alex Woo; Adam Campbell; Jason Heaton; Vlad Kooperman; Uri Lotan
- Theme music composer: Ryan Shore
- Composer: Ryan Shore
- Countries of origin: United States; France
- Original languages: English; French
- No. of seasons: 6
- No. of episodes: 63 (+4 specials)

Production
- Executive producers: Stanley Moore; Alex Woo; Clément Calvet; Jérémie Fajner; Tone Thyne (seasons 1–3); Adam Campbell (seasons 4–6)
- Producers: Timothy Hahn; Freddie Sulit (seasons 4–6); Creative producer: Patrick Ermosilla
- Editors: T.M. Christopher; Greg Knowles
- Running time: 7–8 minutes
- Production companies: Netflix Animation Studios; Kuku Studios; Superprod Studio; Tonko House; Wilmer Sound

Original release
- Network: Netflix
- Release: January 4, 2020 – October 21, 2021

Go! Go! Cory Carson is an animated sitcom created by Alex Woo and Stanley Moore, based on the Go-Go Smart Wheels line of toy vehicles manufactured by VTech. The series is co-produced by American companies Kuku Studios, Tonko House and Wilmer Sound and French company Superprod Studio. Its first season of seven episodes was released on Netflix on January 4, 2020; season 2 was released on March 1, 2020. In the United Kingdom, the main cast's voices are dubbed with British voice actors, replacing their original American ones. A special mini-movie titled Go! Go! Cory Carson: The Chrissy was released on May 1, 2020. Another special titled A Go! Go! Cory Carson Summer Camp was released on August 4, 2020. A Halloween special A Go! Go! Cory Carson Halloween was released on October 2, 2020. A Christmas special A Go! Go! Cory Carson Christmas was released on November 27, 2020. Season 3 was released on December 26, 2020. Season 4 was released on April 27, 2021. Season 5 was released on August 17, 2021. Season 6 – the final season – was released on October 21, 2021.

== Synopsis ==
In a world of anthropomorphic vehicles, Cory Carson, a friendly little orange car, learns to make his way through the childhood struggles of starting school, making friends, and learning responsibility.

== Voice cast ==
=== Carson Family ===
- AC Lim as Cory Carson, an orange car with yellow stripes and the star of the show. Cory is happy and friendly, fond of dancing, and has a mischievous streak that sometimes lands him in trouble.
- Kerry Gudjohnsen as Mama Carson, a sky blue car and the mother of Cory and Chrissy. Mama Carson is a hardworking "carchitect", but always finds time for her kids.
- Paul Killam as Papa Carson, an orange and brown car, and father of Cory and Chrissy. Papa Carson is a stay-at-home dad and cartoonist.
- Maisie Benson as Chrissy Carson, a small light green car and Cory's troublemaking younger sister.

=== Other characters ===
- Smith Foreman as Freddie Firetruck, a red fire engine and Cory's best friend.
- Adelaide Hirasaki as Halle Copter, a light blue and red helicopter and one of Cory's classmates.
- Eli Morse as Timmy O'Tool, a dark green and yellow bulldozer who is Kimmy's brother and Cory's schoolmate.
- Neena-Sinaii Simpo as Kimmy O'Tool, an orange demolition crane with a wrecking ball attached to her arm who is Cory's schoolmate and Timmy's sister.
- Ella Joy Ballesteros as Frannie Fenderson, a pink coupe with tailfins and one of Cory's schoolmate.
- Esther Kibreab as Ms Motors, a yellow school bus who teaches Cory and his friends at the "Motorssori" School (a play on Montessori School).
- Ann Kendrick as Dr. Ethyl Wiperglass a gray coupe with oversized spectacles, the elderly town doctor.
- Terrance Smith as DJ Train Trax, a locomotive who hosts the variety show "Roll Train", and Cory's hero.
- Jamia Lee as Eileen Ice Cream Truck, an ice cream truck.
- John Crosthwaite as Chief, a Police car with a moustache who patrols "Bumperton Hills".

== Production ==
The series was announced by Netflix in November 2018. It is based on VTech's Go! Go! Smart Wheels line of electronic toy vehicles.

Netflix streams the show internationally, dubbed into the local language in several countries. Due to the branding of VTech's Go! Go! Smart Wheels line of toys, the title of the show is usually changed to reflect the toy line's name in different countries (such as Toot-Toot Cory Carson in the UK and Australia, where the toy line is branded Toot-Toot Drivers).

The series’ original score, songs, opening theme, and closing theme were composed by Ryan Shore.
