= In Your Dreams (film) =

2025 film by Alex Woo

- Release poster
- Directed by: Alex Woo
- Screenplay by: Erik Benson; Alex Woo
- Story by: Alex Woo; Stanley Moore
- Produced by: Tim Hahn; Gregg Taylor
- Starring: Jolie Hoang-Rappaport; Elias Janssen; Craig Robinson; Simu Liu; Cristin Milioti; Omid Djalili; Gia Carides
- Edited by: T.M. Christopher; Greg Knowles; Nick Kenway; Ken Schretzmann
- Music by: John Debney
- Production companies: Netflix Animation Studios; Kuku Studios
- Distributed by: Netflix
- Release dates: November 7, 2025 (United States); November 14, 2025 (Netflix)
- Running time: 91 minutes
- Country: United States
- Language: English

In Your Dreams is a 2025 American animated fantasy adventure comedy film directed by Alex Woo, and co-directed by Erik Benson from a script by Woo and Benson and a story by Woo, Benson, and Stanley Moore. The film stars Craig Robinson, Simu Liu, Cristin Milioti, Jolie Hoang-Rappaport, Elias Janssen, Gia Carides, Omid Djalili, and SungWon Cho. Produced by Netflix Animation Studios and Kuku Studios, it had a limited theatrical release on November 7, 2025, before its release on Netflix on November 14. The film received generally positive reviews from critics.

== Plot ==
Stevie Ting is a 12-year old Chinese American girl who struggles with the chaos of her younger brother, Elliot, an 8-year-old aspiring magician. Their family life, once happy, is crumbling. Their parents, Michael and Joanne, are constantly arguing over their future: Joanne wants to move the family to Duluth for a stable teaching job, while Michael wants to stay put and continue pursuing his dream of being a rock musician.

Desperate to stop the divorce and keep everything the way it was, Stevie and Elliot discover a mysterious book called "The Legend of the Sandman" at the thrift store Shiver Me Thrifters, while avoiding its worker Joon Bae. The book claims that if they can find the Sandman in the dream world, he will grant their ultimate wish. They perform a ritual and fall asleep, entering the dream world together.

In the dream world, the siblings discover they are "Lucid Dreamers"—they can control aspects of the world as long as they hold hands and focus. They are joined by Elliot's smelly, wisecracking stuffed giraffe Baloney Tony, who comes to life and who Elliot later finds behind the refrigerator in the waking world. To reach the Sandman, they must traverse surreal landscapes derived from their own subconscious, such as "Breakfast Town" where food is alive and absurd nightmares involving teeth falling out or giant pop quizzes. Throughout the journey, they are hunted by Nightmara, the Queen of Nightmares, who tries to wake them up to force them back to reality.

The siblings eventually reach the Sandman's castle, hoping that he will cast their wish that their parents will not move away to Duluth. However, unlike the benevolent figure they expected, the Sandman traps dreamers by offering them a "perfect" fantasy life that never ends, keeping them asleep forever so he can feed on their dreams. He offers Stevie a simulation of her life where her parents are happy and—crucially—where her brother Elliot never existed.

Stevie is initially enamored with this perfect world, leaving her physical body comatose in the real world. Elliot resists the Sandman's temptation and teams up with Nightmara. It is revealed that Nightmara is actually a "tough love" mentor who originally got along with the Sandman, as her role is not to scare kids for fun, but to wake them up so they can face their real-life problems and grow.

Elliot breaks into Stevie's fantasy to save her. Stevie realizes that a "perfect" world without her brother feels wrong and empty. She rejects the Sandman's illusion, choosing the messy, imperfect reality over a fake paradise. Together, they use their lucid dreaming powers to defeat the Sandman and escape.

The Tings agree to move to Duluth so Joanne can take the job, but Michael compromises by agreeing to start a new band there. The parents are still working through their issues, but they are united in their love for the kids. Stevie accepts that life and her brother will always be a little chaotic, and she learns to embrace the imperfection rather than trying to control everything as the family relocates to Duluth, though the moving truck that Michael was on opens up, causing their stuff to fall out.

In a mid-credits scene, after the Tings drive off following the moving truck incident, Joon finds "The Legend of the Sandman" book on the street while en route to his Polly's Pizzeria gig and throws it into a nearby garbage can before riding off on his hoverboard.

== Voice cast ==
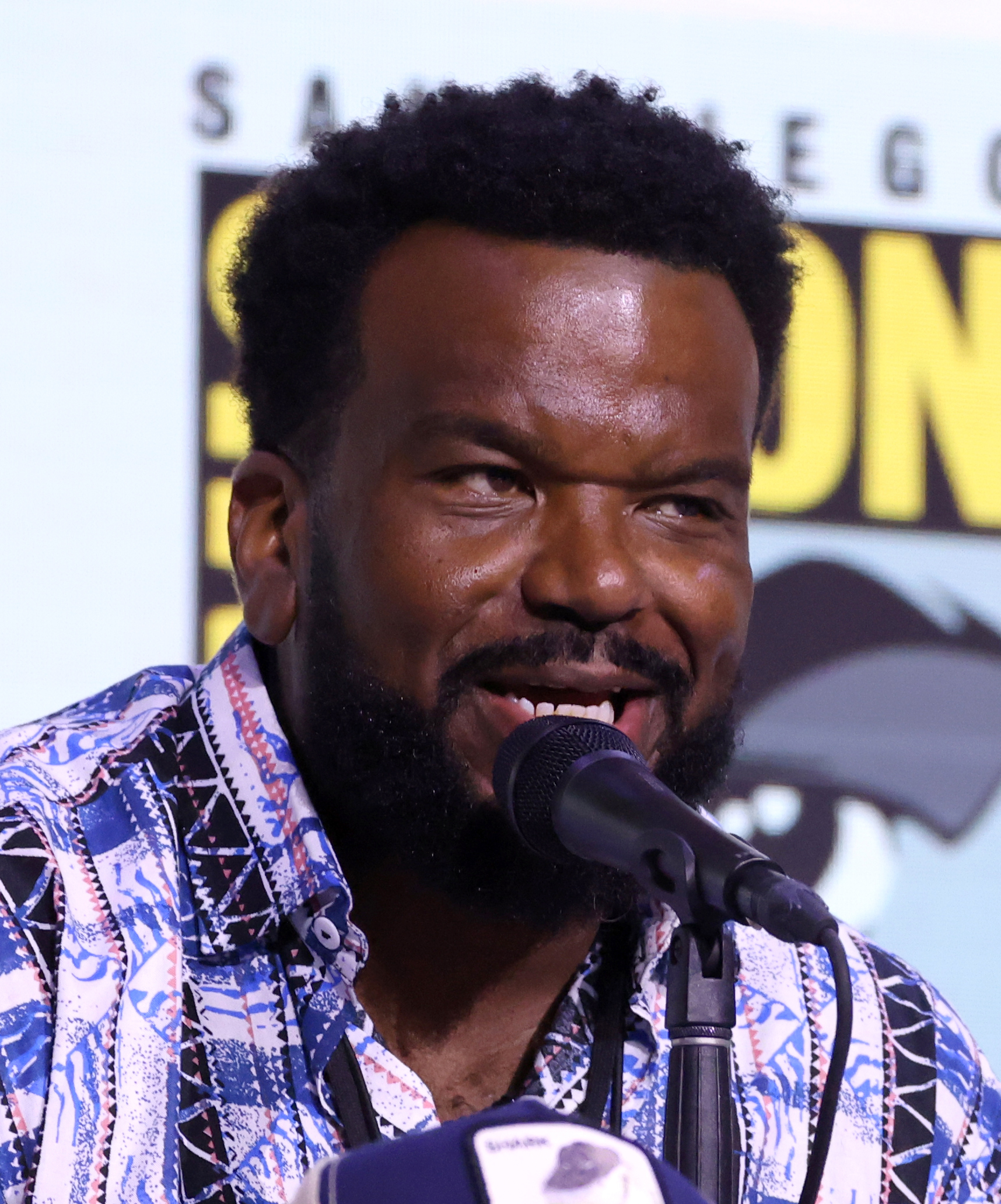
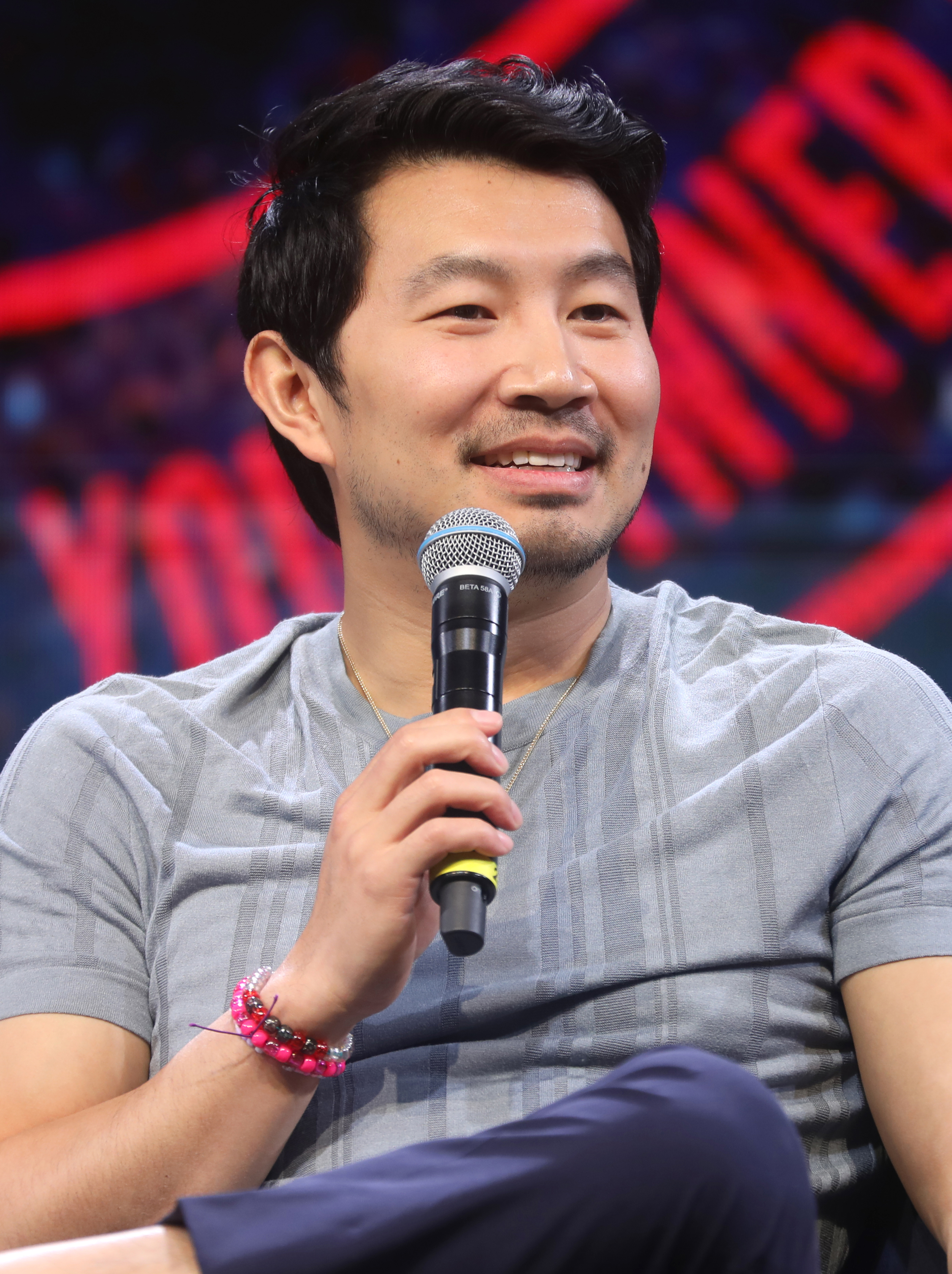
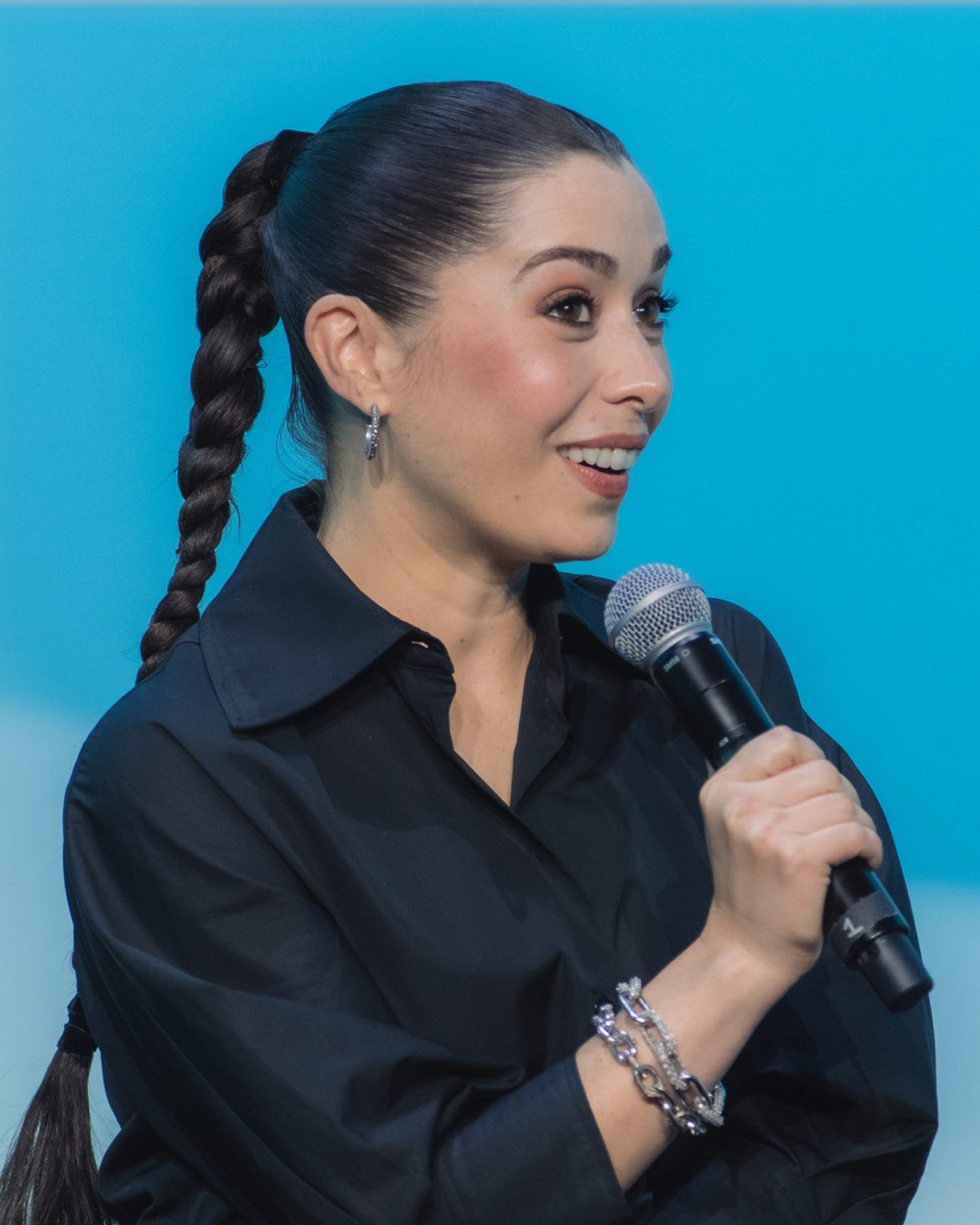
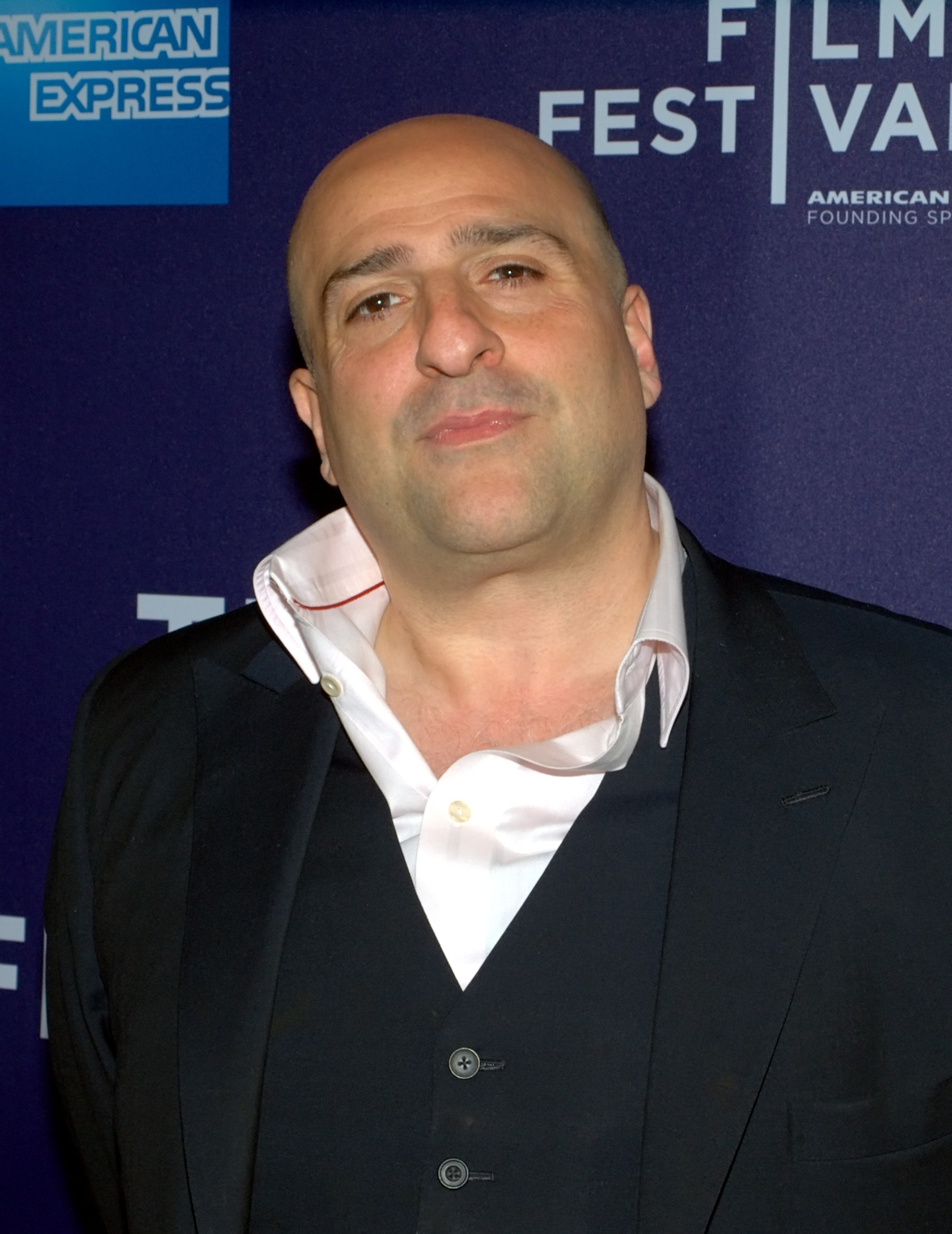
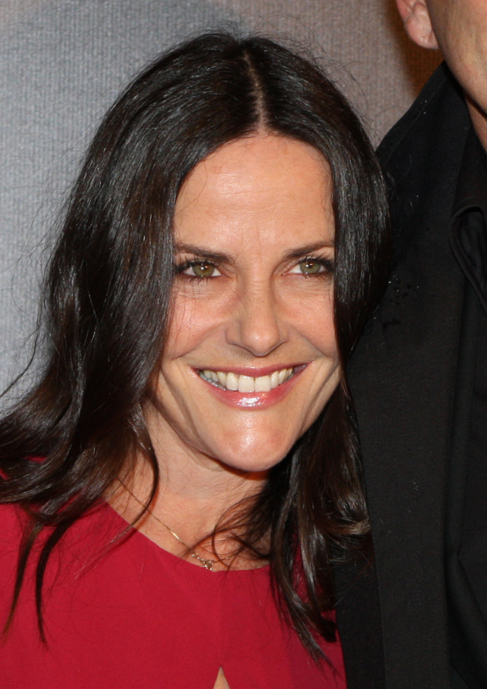
Voice actors of Craig Robinson. Simu Liu, Cristin Milioti, and Omid Djalili, and Gia Carides.
- Jolie Hoang-Rappaport as Stevie Ting, a 12-year old perfectionist. She also serves as the narrator of the film.
  - Hailey Magpali as a four-year-old Stevie Ting
  - Kai Zen as an eight-year-old Stevie Ting
- Elias Janssen as Elliot Ting, an aspiring magician who is the younger brother of Stevie
  - Francis Benson as a four-year-old Elliot Ting
- Craig Robinson as Baloney Tony, a stuffed giraffe
- Simu Liu as Michael Ting, the father of Stevie and Elliot who is an aspiring rock musician
- Cristin Milioti as Joanne Ting, the mother of Stevie and Elliot who works as a teacher and used to do music with Michael
- Omid Djalili as the Sandman, the ruler of the dream world
- Gia Carides as Nightmara, the Queen of Nightmares
- Erik Benson as Delilah, an expired muffin in Breakfast Town who keeps claiming that she is a "perfect princess"
- Zachary Noah Piser as Joon Bae, a Korean-American young man who does various odd jobs, such as a worker for the thrift store Shiver Me Thrifters, and performing as Polly, the parrot mascot of the Chuck E. Cheese-like restaurant Polly's Pizzeria
- Bob Bergen as a blue clown pacifier that appears in Stevie's nightmare
- Maisie Benson as Cereal Girl, an inhabitant of Breakfast Town
- Jorge Diaz as Sausage Dog, an inhabitant of Breakfast Town
- Quinn Minichino Eakens as the Blueberries, the inhabitants of Breakfast Town
- Lizzie Freeman as Sandling #1, a minion of the Sandman
- Kellen Goff as Sandling #2, a minion of the Sandman
- Scott Menville as Sandling #3, a minion of the Sandman
- SungWon Cho as Chad, an uninterested Sandling that works for the Sandman
- Alex Cazares as Scary Grandmother, the nightmare version of Joanne's mother and Stevie and Elliot's grandmother
- Reece Warren as Stevie's friend with braces who appears in Stevie's test nightmare

== Production ==
=== Development ===
In April 2023, it was revealed that Erik Benson and Alex Woo would write the screenplay for the animated film In Your Dreams, which Netflix Animation would produce. Sony Pictures Imageworks would handle the animation. The studio selected Benson as co-director and Woo as the creative lead for the movie. In June 2024, it was announced that Woo wrote the story with Stanley Moore.

=== Casting ===
In June 2024, Simu Liu and Craig Robinson were announced as part of the cast. In March 2025, it was revealed that Cristin Milioti, Jolie Hoang-Rappaport, Elias Janssen, Gia Carides, Omid Djalili, SungWon Cho, and Zachary Noah Piser had joined the cast, with the animation well underway.

=== Music ===
In June 2024, it was announced that John Debney would compose the film's score.

== Release ==
In Your Dreams had a limited theatrical release on November 7, 2025 in select AMC, Regal, and Cinemark theaters. It was released on Netflix on November 14.

== Reception ==
On the review aggregator website Rotten Tomatoes, 86% of 79 critics' reviews are positive, with an average rating of 6.9/10. The website's consensus reads: "Harkening back to other classic animated adventures, In Your Dreams adds imaginative flourishes to a familiar framework and delivers big-hearted family entertainment." Metacritic, which uses a weighted average, assigned the film a score of 61 out of 100, based on 10 critics, indicating "generally favorable" reviews.

=== Accolades ===
Award	Date of ceremony	Category	Recipient(s)	Result	Ref.
Alliance of Women Film Journalists	December 31, 2025	Best Animated Feature	In Your Dreams	Nominated	
Critics' Choice Movie Awards	January 4, 2026	Best Animated Feature	In Your Dreams	Nominated	
Astra Film Awards	January 9, 2026	Best Animated Feature	In Your Dreams	Nominated	
Annie Awards	February 21, 2026	Best FX – Feature	Dmitriy Kolesnik, Stephen Paschk, David Sellares, Stephanie McNair	Nominated	
Annie Awards	February 21, 2026	Best Voice Acting – Feature	Craig Robinson	Nominated	
Visual Effects Society Awards	February 25, 2026	Outstanding Animation in an Animated Feature	Sacha Kapijimpangan Carey Smith, Nicola Lavender, Steve Pilcher	Nominated	
Visual Effects Society Awards	February 25, 2026	Outstanding Effects Simulations in an Animated Feature	Stephanie McNair, Dmitiry Kolesnik, Stephen Paschke, David Sellares	Nominated	
