= Battle Kitty =

American interactive animated television series

- Genre: Science fantasy; Family
- Created by: Matt Layzell
- Directed by: Erik Fountain; Bert Youn
- Voices of: Matt Layzell; Gideon Adlon; Baker Terry; Grey Griffin; Robbie Daymond; Daniele Gaither
- Theme music composer: Max "Maxo" Coburn
- Opening theme: "Breakout"
- Ending theme: "The Champion" (performed by Adriana Figueroa)
- Composer: Max "Maxo" Coburn
- Countries of origin: United States; Australia
- Original language: English
- No. of seasons: 1
- No. of episodes: 9

Production
- Executive producer: Matt Layzell
- Producers: Paul Layzell (Note: Credited as "Supervising Producer".); Amanda McCann (Note: Credited as "Line Producer".)
- Running time: 22–54 minutes
- Production companies: Netflix Animation Studios; Layzell Bros.

Original release
- Network: Netflix
- Release: April 19, 2022

Battle Kitty is an interactive animated television series created by Matt Layzell. It was produced in 2022 by Netflix Animation for Netflix and was animated using Epic Games' Unreal Engine 4. The show was removed from Netflix on December 1, 2024, though it is still available via unofficial YouTube reuploads.

== Synopsis ==
Set in a futuristic-medieval world, where warriors from around the world face off in a Battle Royale style competition, Battle Kitty follows the adventures of an adorable yet feisty kitten named Kitty, using magical bows instead of swords or axes, who along with their best friend Orc, embarks on a quest to become a great champion, by training to become a warrior, defeating all the monsters on Battle Island, and collecting their coveted keys. The duo face many obstacles and naysayers on their path to championhood, only to discover a surprise waiting in store for them at the Ancient Ruins.

== Cast ==
- Matt Layzell as Kitty / Orc / Orc King / Warriors / Squires / Orcs / Skeletons / ZaZa Theme Vocalist / Voice of Suave / Final Gate Guardian / Michael / Bighead Kitty / Backwards Kitty / Kitty Clones / Announcer / Grandson / Fanboys / Sandrew / Soul Stealer Axe / Angelions / Cyber Skeleton / Randy the Owl / Bro Warrior / ???
- Gideon Adlon as ZaZa Royale
- Baker Terry as Bozark / Merchin / Orc Princes / First Monster / Orcs / Warriors / Squires / Z-Face Guy / Midpoint Gate / Safety Squire / Shopkeeper / Kitty Walk Warrior / Gym Warrior / ZaZa Fans / Furnace Monster / Old Man / Shrimp Monster / Fanboys / DJ Bangel / Dave Angelions / Skull / Gary the Tree / Ghosts / Glitch Squire / Merchin Bot
- Grey Griffin as Angel Royale / Warriors / Squires / Yoga Warrior 2 / Soursnake Monster / Angelions / Ghosts / ???
- Robbie Daymond as Iago Fineheart / Warriors / Squires / Announcer / Boxing Monster / ZaZa Fans / Wretched Squire / Kitty Clones / Hydra Monster / Fanboys / Zombie Fanboy / Fussy Warrior / Shopkeepers / Pirates / Ghosts
- Daniele Gaither as Aon Altramnix / Warriors / Squires / Yoga Warrior 1 / Apple Saleslady / Ghosts / Pirate Queen / Angelions / Glitch Warrior
- Amanda McCann as First Gate Guardian / Warriors / Big Lady Jane / Robber 1 / Ghosts
- Phil LaMarr as Target Monster / Racer Monster / Warriors / Squires / Robot / Groundskeeper
- Jaboukie Young-White as Warriors / Squires / Cocky Warrior / Erik / Robber 2 / Brad / Angelions / Pirates / Ghosts / Glitch Warrior
- Connor Warren Smith as Orcish Vocalist
- Nick Sumida as Gramzark / Warriors / Squires / Ghosts / Glitch Squire
- Lauren Tom as Warriors / Squires / Glitch Witches / Glitch Squire
- Fred Tatasciore as Spicy Ice Monster / Ronald / Grave Monster / Crate Monster
- Thurop Van Orman as Memory Monster
- Becky Robinson as Dicey Vine Monster
- Bobby Moynihan as Alley Kitty / Kitty Clones
- David Hornsby as Mole Monster / Lil Kitty / Infinite Kitty / Old Man Kitty / Kitty Clones
- Edi Patterson as Jangel / Angelions
- Davey Swatpaz Ferguson as Mirage Monster
- Katie Shaughnessy as Lost Squire / Warriors
- Kevin Michael Richardson as Grave Monster
- Tom Kenny as Grease Monster / Narrator / Pirates

== Episodes ==
No.	Title	Directed by	Written by	Original release date
1	"Warrior Beach"	Matt Layzell, Bert Youn, & Erik Fountain	Matt Layzell, Shakira Pressley, & Dave Tennant	April 19, 2022
2	"Warrior Park"	Matt Layzell, Bert Youn, & Erik Fountain	Matt Layzell, Shakira Pressley, & Dave Tennant	April 19, 2022
3	"Mount Spicy Ice"	Matt Layzell, Bert Youn, & Erik Fountain	Matt Layzell, Shakira Pressley, & Dave Tennant	April 19, 2022
4	"Cashino Woods"	Matt Layzell, Bert Youn, & Erik Fountain	Matt Layzell, Shakira Pressley, Cooper Villalon Nelson & Dave Tennant	April 19, 2022
5	"Neon Cove"	Matt Layzell, Bert Youn, & Erik Fountain	Matt Layzell, Shakira Pressley, Cooper Villalon Nelson & Dave Tennant	April 19, 2022
6	"Acidic Dunes"	Matt Layzell, Bert Youn, & Erik Fountain	Matt Layzell, Shakira Pressley, Cooper Villalon Nelson & Dave Tennant	April 19, 2022
7	"Dark Web Woods"	Matt Layzell, Bert Youn, & Erik Fountain	Matt Layzell, Shakira Pressley, Cooper Villalon Nelson & Dave Tennant	April 19, 2022
8	"Sky Docks"	Matt Layzell, Bert Youn, & Erik Fountain	Matt Layzell, Shakira Pressley & Dave Tennant	April 19, 2022
9	"Ancient Ruins"	Matt Layzell, Bert Youn, & Erik Fountain	Matt Layzell, Shakira Pressley & Dave Tennant	April 19, 2022

== Production ==
The show originally started out as a series of animated shorts titled "The Adventures of Kitty & Orc" which debuted on series creator Matt Layzell’s Instagram account. Layzell at the time, was a freelance animator who worked on several shows for Cartoon Network and Nickelodeon, such as Apple & Onion, Pinky Malinky and Sanjay and Craig. The shorts were then pitched to an array of networks, until Netflix picked it up for development. The show was then announced in March 2019, taking over 4–5 years of production.

== Release ==
Battle Kitty was released worldwide on April 19, 2022, on Netflix.
