= Alex Woo (filmmaker) =

American animator

- Education: Chinese International School; New York University (BFA)
- Occupations: Director; producer; screenwriter; story artist
- Years active: 2003-present
- Employers: Lucasfilm Animation; Pixar Animation Studios; Kuku Studios
- Awards: Student Academy Award (2004) Emmy Award (2021)
- Website: kukustudios.com

Alex Woo is an American animator, filmmaker, and the founder and CEO of Kuku Studios, an independent animation studio. Woo has contributed to several acclaimed animated films and television series, including The Venture Bros., Ratatouille, WALL-E, Cars 2, The Good Dinosaur, Finding Dory and Go! Go! Cory Carson. He is also the director and co-writer of the Netflix animated feature In Your Dreams.

== Early life and education ==
Born and raised in Saint Paul, Minnesota, Woo moved to Hong Kong as a teenager where he attended the Chinese International School. He later enrolled at New York University's Tisch School of the Arts, earning a Bachelor of Fine Arts in Film and Television Production.

== Career ==
=== Early work ===
Woo began his filmmaking career as an animator and storyboard artist on The Venture Bros. while studying at NYU. His short film Rex Steele: Nazi Smasher won a Student Academy Award. After graduating, he worked as a director in development at Lucasfilm Animation.

=== Pixar Animation Studios ===
In 2005, Woo joined Pixar Animation Studios as a story artist. During his decade-long tenure, he worked on several major films, including:

- Ratatouille (2007)
- WALL·E (2008)
- Cars 2 (2011)
- The Good Dinosaur (2015)
- Finding Dory (2016)

=== Kuku Studios ===
In 2016, Woo left Pixar to found Kuku Studios, an independent animation studio. The name "Kuku" is derived from the Chinese word "哭" (kū), meaning "cry," reflecting the studio's goal of producing stories that make people "cry tears of laughter and tears of pathos".

At Kuku Studios, Woo was the creator and executive producer of the Emmy Award-winning animated series Go! Go! Cory Carson. He also directed and co-wrote the original animated feature film In Your Dreams, which premiered on Netflix on November 14, 2025. The film follows two siblings who enter the world of dreams to find the Sandman and have their ultimate wish granted.

== Filmography ==
Films

Year	Title	Role(s)
2007	Ratatouille	Story Artist
2008	WALL-E	Story Artist
2011	Cars 2	Story Artist
2015	The Good Dinosaur	Story Artist
2016	Finding Dory	Story Lead
2025	In Your Dreams	Director & Co-Writer

Short Films

Year	Title	Role(s)
2004	Rex Steele: Nazi Smasher	Director & Producer

TV Episodes and Specials

Year	Title	Role(s)
2003	The Venture Bros.	Animator & Storyboard Artist
2020-2021	Go! Go! Cory Carson	Executive Producer
2020	A Go! Go! Cory Carson Summer Camp	Executive Producer
2020	A Go! Go! Cory Carson Halloween	Executive Producer
2020	A Go! Go! Cory Carson Christmas	Executive Producer
2020	Go! Go! Cory Carson: The Chrissy	Executive Producer
2020	Go! Go! Cory Carson: Chrissy Takes the Wheel	Executive Producer

== Awards and nominations ==
Year	Award	Category	Work	Result	Ref
2004	Student Academy Award (Gold)	Animation	Rex Steele: Nazi Smasher	Won	
2021	Day Time Emmy Award	Outstanding Directing Team for a Preschool Animated Program	Go! Go! Cory Carson	Won	
2022	Children & Family Emmy Awards	Outstanding Directing Team for a Preschool Animated Program	Go! Go! Cory Carson	Nominated	
