= Camden Hauge =

American businesswoman

Camden Hauge Sin is an American businesswoman based in Shanghai and New York City. Hauge operates multiple hospitality venues in Shanghai, including Social Supply and Egg.

== Early life and education ==
Hauge was raised in New Jersey.

== Career ==
Hauge moved to Shanghai, China in 2012. In 2020, Hauge founded Shanghai-based Happy Place Hospitality Group.

In 2025, Hauge founded China Wine Club, a buyer of Chinese wines based in the United States.
