= Nidhi Chanani =

Indian-American freelance illustrator and artist

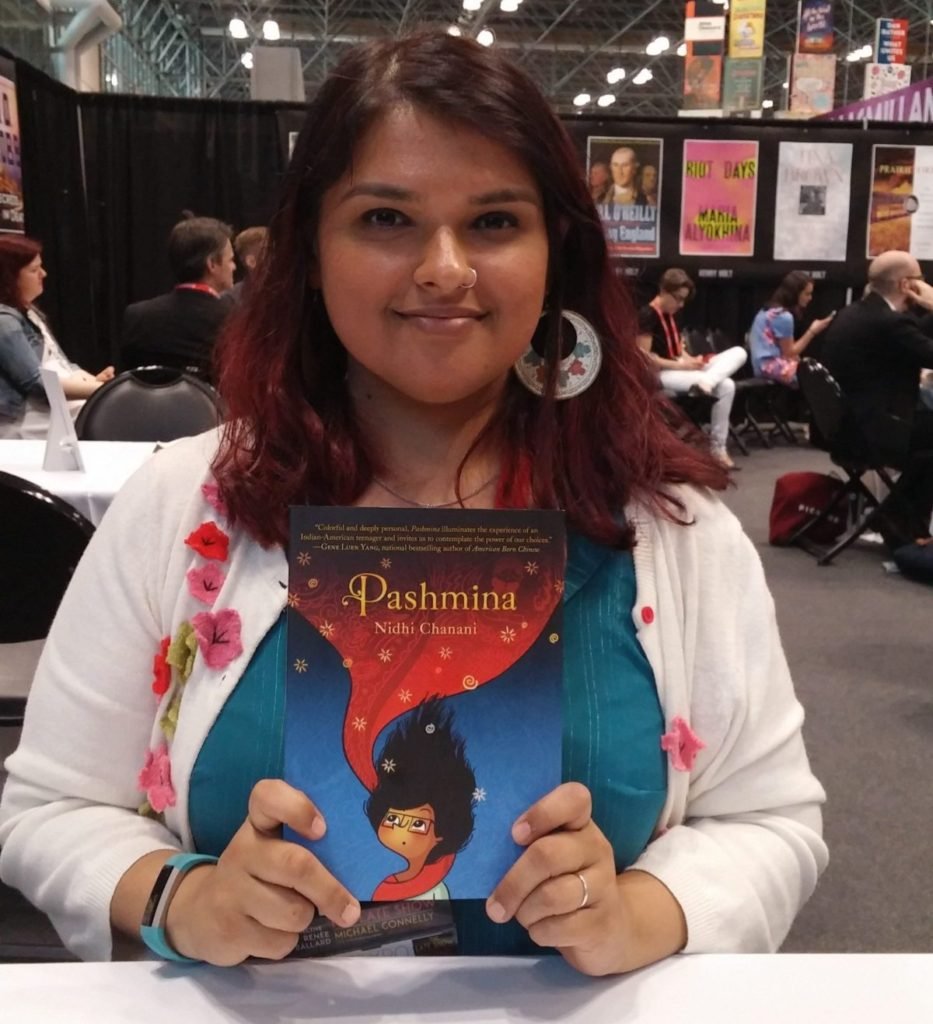
- Chanani in 2017
- Born: 1980 (age 45–46) Kolkata, India
- Notable works: Pashmina; Jukebox

Nidhi Chanani (born 1980) is an Indian-American freelance illustrator and artist. Her debut graphic novel Pashmina was released by First Second Books in October 2017.

== Early life ==
Nidhi Chanani was born in Kolkata, India and moved to Southern California when she was four months old. She received a degree in Literature from the University of California, Santa Cruz. She then attended the Academy of Art University in San Francisco for a year and a half before dropping out, feeling "limited by the way art is taught."

== Career ==
Chanani worked at non-profit organizations before entering the comics field. Chanani runs an online webseries and store titled EveryDayLoveArt.com, where she tries to capture the relevance for "ordinary everyday moments in our daily lives". Chanani explains that Pashmina is a story of a first-generation girl who is "trying to understand herself".

She worked as a concept artist for the 2011 Australian film, Hannah and the Hasbian. She has also worked with Hasbro, Paramount Pictures and Disney. Other than her novel, Chanani has illustrated Misty: the Proud Cloud by Hugh Howey. Chanani has also been commissioned by Dark Horse Comics for a graphic novel based on Walt Disney Animation Studios' 1992 animated feature Aladdin titled Disney's princess: Jasmine's new pet.The graphic novel revolves around Jasmine and her pet tiger, Raja's, relationship when they first met. It was released in October 2018. Chanani has written and Illustrated a bilingual children book titled Shubh Raatri Dost (Good Night Friend) with Bharat babies. Her second graphic novel, Jukebox, was a collaboration with her husband Nick Giordano about two Muslim American cousins, Shaheen and Tannaz in San Francisco who find a magical jukebox that comes to their aid when Giovanni, Shaheen's father, goes missing. It was released on June 22, 2021. She illustrated the book I Will Be Fierce by Bea Birdsong, which was published on April 23, 2019 by Macmillan Publishers.

Throughout her work Chanani has worked to represent normal problems that exist within families, as well as showcasing female characters of color dealing with issues of identity. She utilizes the visual medium of graphic novels and comics to utilize the storytelling through both written and visual mediums in order to portray aspects of her stories that cannot be demonstrated in only one medium.

In March 2019, Netflix announced it will adapt Chanani's best selling graphic novel Pashmina into a CG animated musical with Gurinder Chadha set to direct. In December 2022, Chadha stated that the film was cancelled for unknown reasons.

== Influences ==
For Pashmina, Chanani drew inspiration from various sources. According to her "My inspiration for Pashmina came from a variety of sources: my mom, growing up in the US, my first trip to India, and the choices women make — all of these things are woven into the story. When I was younger my parents would travel to India often. When they returned, their suitcases had a pungent, almost magical smell—from a place that seemed very far away. I was probably 10 years old. Opening their suitcase made me feel close to this other world. In a way, I believe this story has been with me since then."

Chanani has been influenced throughout her career by the Indian novelist, Arundhati Roy. Roy influenced Chanani in her ability to incorporate political underpinnings in the voices of the characters throughout her work. Similar to Roy, Chanani has made representing Indian people and the everyday struggles that they encounter a central element of her writing and graphic work. Chanani, according to her own interviews, is deeply influenced by the author Gene Luen Yang.

Chanani is an instructor at the California College of the Arts. She often features local Bay area backdrops, as well as images derived from her Indian heritage. She explains, "I grew up watching Bollywood films on the weekends, eating Indian breakfasts, and spending time with my Indian family. It didn't ever feel like because I didn't live in India, India didn't live in me. Even if I don't draw something Indian per se, something about my "Indian-ness" will come through whether I make the characters brown or pick a setting reminiscent of India. There is something about who I am in everything that I do. And who I am is Indian. I don't think that is ever removable from what I do."

== Cultural significance and reception ==
Pashmina received the 2017 Virginia Library Association Graphic Diversity Award in the Youth Category, and the 2018 South Asia Book Award for Children's Literature in the Grade 3-6 category. Pashmina was also a Best Fiction for Older Readers selection for 2017 by the Chicago Public Library. It was eventually released by Harper Collins in India.

In April 2012, Nidhi was honored at the White House as a Champion of Change.

== Technique and materials ==
Chanani creates her art using digital media, wood burning, and watercolors, stating: "For my illustrations I use flash and Photoshop with a heavy dose of brushes and textures I've created. For my wood burnings I use raw wood and a professional wood burning pen." Chanani also uses magical realism in her work to tell her stories; within a narrative that is otherwise rooted in reality, she employs talking animals and conversations with gods.

== Awards ==
- 2012 White House Champion of Change
- 2017 Virginia Library Association Graphic novel Diversity Award in youth category
- 2018 South Asia Book Award Honor (Grade 3-6)

== Personal life ==
Chanani lives in San Francisco Bay Area with her husband, daughter and two cats.
