= Bron Studios =

Canadian film production company

Bron Media Corporation
- Trade name: Bron Studios
- Industry: Film
- Founded: 2010; 16 years ago
- Founder: Aaron L. Gilbert; Brenda Gilbert
- Defunct: 2023
- Headquarters: Burnaby, British Columbia, Canada
- Key people: Aaron L. Gilbert (CEO); Brenda Gilbert (co-president); Steven Thibault (COO)
- Divisions: Bron Animation; Bron Creative (JV); Bron Digital; Bron Life; Bron Releasing; Bron Studios; Bron Ventures
- Subsidiaries: Mad Solar
- Website: bronstudios.com

Bron Studios (stylized as BRON) was a Canadian motion picture company based in British Columbia owned by Bron Media Corporation between 2010 and 2023. The company's notable productions included Joker, Bombshell, Queen & Slim, Greyhound, Judas and the Black Messiah, The Mule, Henchmen, Roman J. Israel, Esq., Rudderless, Welcome to Me, The Addams Family, The Willoughbys, and Ghostbusters: Afterlife.

Bron Creative was a joint venture between Bron Studios and Creative Wealth Media. Bron Releasing was a subsidiary company concerned with sales and distribution of films.

== History ==
=== Bron Studios ===
Bron Studios was founded in 2010 by Aaron L. Gilbert and Brenda Gilbert. Originally from London, Ontario, Aaron began his career in the music industry before segueing into film finance and production. He served as the managing director of Media House Capital, a senior lender in the film and television business, prior to launching the company.

Bron Creative was a joint venture between Bron Studios and Creative Wealth Media, which provided equity for studio co-productions and senior secured debt financing for independent film and television productions.

Bron formed Bron Animation division led by Gil Rimmer and Ben Burden Smith as creative directors. The division's first project was two Mighty Mighty Monsters specials.

=== Bron Releasing ===
On October 12, 2021, Matt Brodlie and Jonathan Kier co-founded Upgrade Productions, based in Los Angeles, which formed a partnership with Bron Releasing, aiming to develop and produce quality local-language productions for a worldwide audience. Backed by German company Constantin Film, Upgrade aimed to finance projects in Eastern Europe, Latin America, and Japan. In November 2021, Bron appointed Kier as president of Bron sales, marketing and distribution arm

=== Bron Media ===
In September 2017, Bron Studios was reorganized with Bron Media Corp. becoming Bron Studios' parent company. Genre label the Realm, Bron Releasing and Bron Animation joined the studio as Bron Media subsidiaries. Daniel D. McClure was also hired as president and chief operating officer from his position as Toronto-based CQI Capital Management CEO.

Its Bron Venture unit invested in starting up Media Res, Michael Ellenberg's TV and film production company in June 2017. Bron would also find financing for the start up's projects.

By 2016, Bron Media and Creative Wealth Media form a joint venture, Bron Creative, to fund films. The venture's first film is Fences by Paramount Pictures. Next, the venture agreed to fully finance an animated film series, up to four films, based on Bear Grylls produced by YBG Films, a joint venture between Grylls and Platinum Films. In December 2018, Bron Creative and Warner Bros. agreed to a six film slate deal with $100 million in co-financing. Bron Creative agreed to another $100 million co-financing slate deal with MGM in June 2019.

=== Bron TV ===
In the late 2010s, Bron began developing an internal television production group and partnered with producer and former HBO executive Michael Ellenberg's production company Media Res. Bron coproduced a series of international projects at this time. In 2019 and 2020, furthered expanded their television venture into a formal division.

=== Bankruptcy and involvement in securities fraud ===
On July 19, 2023, Bron Studios filed for creditor protection in Canada, and Chapter 15 bankruptcy in the United States, citing the COVID-19 pandemic and both the WGA and SAG-AFTRA strikes as the reasons of its eventual downfall. However, an April 28, 2023 report by the American Bar Association described a $100 million securities fraud perpetrated by Clayton Smith and Crystal Wealth Management, involving loans to BRON group productions. The report also stated "there appears to be clear evidence that Gilbert, Thibault, and Smith worked together to mislead Crystal Wealth’s auditor BDO by coordinating their responses to inquiries about the financial position of the film loans."

== Filmography ==
=== Bron Studios ===
- Paradox (2010)
- Jabberwock (2011)
- Foreverland (2011)
- Trust Me (co-produced) (2013)
- A Single Shot (2013)
- Mighty Mighty Monsters in New Fears Eve (Note: Produced at Bron Animation) (2013)
- Mighty Mighty Monsters in Halloween Havoc(2013)
- Rudderless (2014)
- Welcome to Me (2014)
- Tell (2014)
- Mighty Mighty Monsters in Pranks for the Memories (2015)
- I Saw the Light (2015)
- Into the Forest (2015)
- Meadowland (2015)
- The Driftless Area (2015)
- Tumbledown (2015)
- Hyena Road (2015)
- Ithaca (2015)
- The Birth of a Nation (2016)
- Special Correspondents (2016)
- Una (2016)
- The Cleanse (2016)
- The Philosophy of Phil (2017)
- Beatriz at Dinner (2017)
- The Layover (2017)
- Parallel (2018)
- Drunk Parents (2018)
- Leave No Trace (2018)
- Monster (2018)
- Prospect (2018)
- To Dust (2018)
- Tully (2018)
- The Spy Who Dumped Me (2018)
- The Nightingale (2018)
- A Simple Favor (2018)
- The Front Runner (2018)
- Assassination Nation (2018)
- Henchmen (2018)
- The Red Sea Diving Resort (2019)
- Bombshell (2019)
- The Willoughbys (2020)
- Capone (2020)
- Pieces of a Woman (2020)
- Those Who Wish Me Dead (2021)
- The Survivor (2021)
- A Journal for Jordan (2021)
- Americana (2023)
- Surrounded (2023)
- Monkey Man (2024)
- Newborn (2026)

=== Bron Creative ===
- Fences (2016) Paramount Pictures
- Roman J. Israel, Esq. (2017) Columbia Pictures
- The Mule (2018) Warner Bros.
- Isn't It Romantic (2019) Warner Bros./New Line Cinema/Netflix
- Child's Play (2019) Orion Pictures
- The Kitchen (2019) Warner Bros./New Line Cinema
- Joker (2019) Warner Bros.
- The Good Liar (2019) Warner Bros./New Line Cinema
- The Addams Family (2019) Metro-Goldwyn-Mayer
- Queen & Slim (2019) Universal Pictures
- Greyhound (2020) Apple TV+
- Gretel & Hansel (2020) Orion Pictures
- The Way Back (2020) Warner Bros.
- Superintelligence (2020) HBO Max/Warner Bros./New Line Cinema
- Bad Trip (2021) Orion Pictures/Netflix (uncredited)
- Candyman (2021) Universal Pictures/MGM
- Respect (2021) MGM
- House of Gucci (2021) MGM
- Cyrano (2021) MGM
- Licorice Pizza (2021) MGM/Focus Features
- Chaos Walking (2021) Lionsgate (uncredited)
- The Addams Family 2 (2021) Metro-Goldwyn-Mayer
- Ghostbusters: Afterlife (2021) Columbia Pictures
- Judas and the Black Messiah (2021) Warner Bros.
- 65 (2023) Columbia Pictures

== See also ==
- Mad Solar
