= Pashmina (graphic novel) =

Graphic novel by Nidhi Chanani

- Author: Nidhi Chanani
- Language: English
- Subject: Graphic Novel
- Genre: Children's Novel
- Published: First Second Books
- Publication date: 2017
- Publication place: USA
- Media type: Book
- Pages: 168 pages
- ISBN: 978-16-2672-087-9

Pashmina is a debut graphic novel written by Nidhi Chanani. The novel focuses on the relationship between an Indian-American mother and her teenage daughter.

== Synopsis ==
Protagonist Priyanka Das's mother leaves India many years ago and refrains from revealing why, but Priyanka's discovery of a pashmina shawl hidden in a suitcase helps her imagine a homeland she has never been to.

== Cancelled film adaptation ==
On 6 March 2019, it was reported that Gurinder Chadha would be directing an animated musical feature film based on the novel for Netflix. Ashok Amritraj was to serve as a producer through his Hyde Park Entertainment banner. In December 2022, Chadha stated that the film was cancelled for unknown reasons.
