= Brenda Gilbert =

Canadian film producer

- Occupation: Producer
- Years active: 2010-present
- Notable work: Joker; Judas and the Black Messiah; Licorice Pizza

Brenda Gilbert is a Canadian film producer, executive, and entrepreneur most known for being co-founder of Bron Studios along with her husband, Aaron Gilbert. Gilbert has worked in media for over twenty years having produced or executive produced more than two dozen projects.

== Career ==
Gilbert, along with her husband, Aaron, founded Bron Studios in 2010, which has produced films such as Joker, Judas and the Black Messiah, and Licorice Pizza. She was named president of Bron Animation in 2015. As the company grew, Brenda began to focus on the company's unscripted business, Bron Life, helping produce the Emmy-nominated documentary Loudmouth about the life of Al Sharpton, as well as other nonfiction projects. Brenda sits on the boards of Film Independent and the Foundation for the Augmentation of African Americans in Film (FAAAF). Brenda also spearheads the company's philanthropic arm including the Bron Content incubator which supports rising artists of color in producing work that center stories of color. Bron companies have won 6 Academy Awards and received more than 250 film festival award nominations. In 2022, Gilbert and her husband were named The Hollywood Reporter's "Producers of the Year."

== Personal life ==
Brenda and her husband have three children who they raise in Vancouver.
