= List of Brickleberry episodes =

Brickleberry is an American animated comedy sitcom that premiered on September 25, 2012, and ended on April 14, 2015 on Comedy Central. The series, created by Roger Black and Waco O'Guin, follows a group of forest rangers that work in fictional Brickleberry National Park, the national park in the United States.

A total of 36 episodes were produced before it was announced that the series would not return for a fourth season. In spite of this, a crossover episode with Paradise PD was made.

== Series overview ==
Season	Episodes	Originally released		
Season	Episodes	First released	Last released	Network
1	10	September 25, 2012	December 4, 2012	Comedy Central
2	13	September 3, 2013	November 26, 2013	Comedy Central
3	13	September 16, 2014	April 14, 2015	Comedy Central
Special	1	March 6, 2020		Netflix

== Episodes ==
=== Season 1 (2012) ===
This is the only season to use Adobe Flash animation and Kaitlin Olson as the voice of Ethel.

No. overall	No. in season	Title	Directed by	Written by	Original release date	Prod. code	US viewers (millions)
1	1	"Welcome to Brickleberry"	Carl Faruolo	Roger Black & Waco O'Guin	September 25, 2012	1RAG01	1.68
Self-absorbed park ranger Steve Williams worries that new ranger, Ethel's, arrival will jeopardize his stranglehold on Ranger of the Month and does whatever it takes to sabotage her. Meanwhile, Malloy, a bitter, sarcastic bear cub adopted by Woody, is put on a diet after Ethel declares that Malloy's junk food eating will take years off his life – and goes on a desperate search for his beloved fatty foods.
2	2	"Two Weeks Notice"	Brian LoSchiavo	Rocky Russo & Jeremy Sosenko	October 2, 2012	1RAG04	1.49
After having unprotected sex with a prostitute to console himself from a bad night of speed-dating, Steve ends up in worse trouble when he learns that he has contracted "cana-syphil-AIDS," a fatal sexually transmitted disease described as "...if cancer did it with syphilis and got full-blown AIDS," and has two weeks to live. Meanwhile, Woody interviews new candidates for park ranger after hearing about Steve's death, Malloy begs Woody to give him the job so he can use the park's guns to get back at two bully raccoons, and Denzel is caught in the middle of an elderly mother-daughter catfight.
3	3	"Saved by the Balls"	Brian LoSchiavo	Rocky Russo & Jeremy Sosenko	October 9, 2012	1RAG09	1.69
Ethel tries to cure Connie's dependence on a psychic, while Steve and Denzel do some undercover cop work and are mistaken for the new Russian marijuana growers after the main undercover cops are killed, and Woody neuters Malloy to keep him from humping everything.
4	4	"Squabbits"	Mike Hollingsworth	Roger Black & Waco O'Guin	October 16, 2012	1RAG02	1.05
Competition with Yellowstone prompts Woody's plan to spotlight cute animals in order to get more ratings than Yellowstone, so Steve hatches an idea for a squirrel-rabbit hybrid called a Squabbit.
5	5	"Race Off!"	Carl Faruolo	Michael Jamin & Sivert Glarum	October 23, 2012	1RAG06	1.58
After getting caught in a forest fire, Steve and Denzel wake up in the hospital with switched skin colors. Meanwhile, Connie freaks out when she finds out the visiting Secretary of State used to be her Marine drill sergeant who forced her to eat as punishment for storing food in her foot locker.
6	6	"Gay Bomb"	Mike Hollingsworth	Roger Black & Waco O'Guin	October 30, 2012	1RAG07	1.43
A controversy-courting church gathers at Brickleberry with Woody's permission, but Connie makes herself scarce due to her history with the group's policies and her lesbian personality, and in the process, discovers a secret military installation of a missile that turns heterosexuals into homosexuals.
7	7	"Hello Dottie"	Chris Song	Deepak Sethi	November 13, 2012	1RAG05	1.30
Connie, Ethel, and Denzel begin making demands when they're dissatisfied with their working conditions at the park. Steve tries to explain the rangers' complaints to Woody, who ends up replacing Connie, Ethel, and Denzel with rangers from India. The three fired rangers soon find work at a strip club, where Connie becomes the main attraction, Denzel is a DJ, and Ethel is a janitor. Steve falls in love with the female Indian ranger Dottie.
8	8	"Steve's Bald"	Zac Moncrief	Michael Jamin & Sivert Glarum	November 20, 2012	1RAG08	1.09
While preparing for the annual Ranger Ball, the rangers discover that Steve is bald and has been wearing a toupee for most of his life. To avoid such humiliation, Steve drinks a remedy that grows hair all over his body making everyone except Malloy think he's Sasquatch (Bigfoot). Meanwhile, after Ethel accidentally hits a deer, she's forced to kill it, and becomes obsessed with murdering animals.
9	9	"Daddy Issues"	Zac Moncrief	Michael Jamin & Sivert Glarum	November 27, 2012	1RAG03	1.31
When Steve volunteers to track down the person who has been leaving the park littered with half-eaten goats, he finds his father - the greatest park ranger Brickleberry has ever known - living in a cave. Things heat up when Ethel is smitten with Mr. Williams and decides to marry him, but cool down when Steve learns that Connie, who has a crush on Ethel, is planning to assassinate Mr. Williams on their wedding day.
10	10	"The Dam Show"	Chris Song	Michael Jamin & Sivert Glarum	December 4, 2012	1RAG10	1.33
The dam that holds back Brickleberry River is destroyed by fireworks set off in honor of Woody's birthday. The park floods and the rangers, along with the rest of the survivors, must re-form society on an island the rangers are washed onto.

=== Season 2 (2013) ===
Starting this season, comedian Natasha Leggero has taken over the role of Ethel from Kaitlin Olson and the animation switches from Adobe Flash animation to traditional animation with digital ink and paint as proof of concept. Also, the intro is slightly altered to follow the episode's plot, most of the time following the cold open.

No. overall	No. in season	Title	Directed by	Written by	Original release date	Prod. code	US viewers (millions)
11	1	"Miracle Lake"	Brian LoSchiavo	Roger Black & Waco O'Guin	September 3, 2013	2RAG01	1.13
When Firecracker Jim miraculously regains his blown-off limbs after falling in Brickleberry Lake, Woody and Malloy become televangelists and charge admission to have the injured and sick cured with the power of the lake's waters. Meanwhile, Ethel and Denzel get stuck in an ice cave and Denzel discovers a frozen Neanderthal woman – and makes her his girlfriend.
12	2	"The Comeback"	Zac Moncrief	Rocky Russo & Jeremy Sosenko	September 10, 2013	2RAG03	1.17
Woody's past life as a porn star is discovered, and Malloy becomes a porn director so Woody can revive his career and show up an up-and-comer named Duke Dick (voiced by John DiMaggio). Meanwhile, Steve goes after a ghost who allegedly ruined his childhood.
13	3	"Woody's Girl"	Ira Sherak	Roger Black & Waco O'Guin	September 17, 2013	2RAG05	1.25
Woody takes up yoga after suffering a mini-stroke, and falls for his instructor, who is part of a cult. Meanwhile, Ethel is put in charge of the park and Denzel buys a jetpack with the money he inherited from his latest elderly girlfriend.
14	4	"Trailer Park"	Brian LoSchiavo	Michael Rowe	September 24, 2013	2RAG04	1.36
Just as Woody is about to evict Bobby Possumcods for drunk and disorderly conduct, Bobby finds a will in his trailer's air conditioner that states that he is the sole heir of Brickleberry Park, so he throws out the rangers and turns the national park into a trailer park.
15	5	"Crippleberry"	Sueng Cha	Michael Rowe	October 1, 2013	2RAG02	1.21
Steve becomes paralyzed after riding Firecracker Jim's Paralyzer Rollercoaster, but Woody thinks Steve is faking his injuries – especially after Malloy gets a job as Steve's attorney and takes him to court over not making the park handicap-accessible. Meanwhile, Connie befriends freaks from the carnival's sideshow.
16	6	"Ranger Games"	Sueng Cha	Eric Rogers	October 8, 2013	2RAG08	1.27
When Brickleberry National Park hosts the Ranger Games (an Olympics event for park rangers) for the first time in 20 years (after Woody snapped over losing out on the gold medal), Woody hires a Swiss Olympian named Magnus to be a ringer, which doesn't sit well with Steve, who wants to prove to Woody that he's good at gymnastics. Meanwhile, Denzel seeks out his favorite ice skater for lessons on how to be an Olympic skater, and Malloy adopts Hobo Larry as a pet.
17	7	"My Way or the Highway"	Susie Dietter	Rocky Russo & Jeremy Sosenko	October 15, 2013	2RAG06	1.33
After Woody angers Governor Melcher when Ethel invites her to Brickleberry for a political rally, the rangers wake up to a superhighway running through the park, so Woody runs for governor and Ethel runs against him to prove that women can be competent politicians. Meanwhile, Steve is stuck in his cabin thanks to the superhighway and gets picked up by a deranged killer, and Connie joins Bobby and BoDean's militia, who makes the militia more inclusive to all races, ethnic groups, and sexual preferences.
18	8	"Little Boy Malloy"	Brian LoSchiavo	Michael Rowe	October 22, 2013	2RAG07	1.16
To show up her sister, Lucy, Ethel ropes Connie into being her husband and disguises Malloy as her son by shaving him bald, dressing him up like a boy, and tranquilizing him. Meanwhile, Steve falls for a woman named Stephanie who looks like him and Malloy takes down a schoolyard bully.
19	9	"The Animals Strike Back"	Paul Lee	Rocky Russo & Jeremy Sosenko	October 29, 2013	2RAG09	1.05
Led by Nazir the moose, the animals of Brickleberry revolt and try to take back the park with Malloy's help after Nazir tells Malloy that a human was responsible for his parents' death. Meanwhile, Steve tries to keep Malloy from finding out that he was the one who killed Malloy's parents (as seen in "Welcome to Brickleberry").
20	10	"Scared Straight"	Ira Sherak	Greg White	November 5, 2013	2RAG10	1.01
Denzel calls on his old gang from Detroit to put an end to Malloy's misbehaving, but their plan backfires when the bear cub's antics land them in jail, where Denzel is about to be married to a convict named Meat-Hammer (voiced by Abraham Benrubi) and Malloy becomes the leader of a Latino prison gang.
21	11	"Trip to Mars"	Sueng Cha	Josh Weinstein	November 12, 2013	2RAG13	1.12
The rangers help astronauts with an upcoming space mission – and discover that the entire space mission is a fraud made to reel in TV ratings after Steve (who is high on peyote) is mistaken for a space alien. Meanwhile, Malloy joins a group of displaced Native Americans and urges them to raid the Hazelhurst Mall.
22	12	"My Favorite Bear"	Spencer Laudiero	Kevin Jakubowski	November 19, 2013	2RAG11	1.11
Steve's childhood hero, Flamey the Bear (voiced by Maurice LaMarche), comes to Brickleberry for the televised reopening of the park, and Steve volunteers to help him prepare – and things go wrong when Flamey gets drunk and cuts a path of destruction throughout Hazelhurst. Meanwhile, Malloy tricks Woody into getting plastic surgery in time for the televised reopening of the park.
23	13	"Aparkalypse"	Brian LoSchiavo	Lew Morton	November 26, 2013	2RAG12	1.15
Connie (who took a side job as a surrogate mother for a homosexual couple) gives birth to a child whose very existence is a sign of the Apocalypse. While Malloy and Woody hide out in Bobby and BoDean's underground bunker, Steve, Ethel, and Denzel plot to kill the baby to stop the end of days.

=== Season 3 (2014–15) ===
No. overall	No. in season	Title	Directed by	Written by	Original release date	Prod. code	US viewers (millions)
24	1	"Obamascare"	Ira Sherak	Roger Black & Waco O'Guin	September 16, 2014	3RAG01	0.93
President Barack Obama visits Brickleberry, while Woody and Steve are joined at the liver thanks to an obscure clause in the Affordable Healthcare Act (ObamaCare). Meanwhile, Connie tries to convince Ethel that President Obama sexually harassed her back when he was campaigning for President in 2008, and Bobby and BoDean come up with their own healthcare act.
25	2	"In Da Club"	Spencer Laudiero	Lisa Parsons	September 23, 2014	3RAG02	0.74
Woody gets angry when a fancy country club turns him down but welcomes Denzel as a member. Meanwhile, Malloy balks at having his anal glands expressed, only for them to enlarge and become infected and Steve makes friends with a trio of lesbians who think Steve is a woman.
26	3	"Miss National Park"	Bert Ring	Christopher Vane	September 30, 2014	3RAG03	0.98
Ethel and Connie compete in a beauty pageant, while Steve and Denzel (who has been "cured" of his attraction to elderly women thanks to Dr. Kuzniak) end up dating the same woman, who turns out to be a dominatrix whose husband is threatening Woody over some gambling debts.
27	4	"That Brother's My Father"	Ashley J. Long	Rocky Russo & Jeremy Sosenko	October 7, 2014	3RAG04	1.07
Denzel dates (then marries) Woody's abusive, domineering mother, while Connie kidnaps Pat Sajak after blowing her chances at becoming a contestant on Wheel of Fortune.
28	5	"Write 'Em Cowboy"	Matthew Long	Eric Goldberg & Peter Tibbals	October 14, 2014	3RAG05	0.89
In a send-up of the movie Big, Malloy gets his wish to become a full-grown bear and moves away to live and work on his own. Meanwhile, Denzel helps Steve realize his dream of being a country singer, but after discovering that Steve's songs have homoerotic lyrics in them, Denzel works with the Gay Mafia in order to make Steve a hit with male homosexuals.
29	6	"Old Wounds"	Ira Sherak	Roger Black & Waco O'Guin	October 21, 2014	3RAG06	0.79
Woody is demoted by the visiting Secretary of the Interior (voiced by Tress MacNeille). Meanwhile, Denzel's personality changes when he stops smoking marijuana, which causes a rift in his friendship with Steve and Connie and Ethel accidentally get high off the marijuana brownies Denzel sold.
30	7	"Baby Daddy"	Spencer Laudiero	Josh Lehrman & Kyle Stegina	October 28, 2014	3RAG07	0.82
Ethel becomes pregnant after she gets drunk and sleeps with Steve. Ethel wants an abortion, but Steve really wants to have a child, so he asks Dr. Kuzniak to surgically implant Ethel's fetus inside of his stomach. Meanwhile, Woody, Denzel, and Connie end up in a mental hospital after telling a psychiatrist about their crazy adventures and how Malloy is a talking bear who commits evil acts.
31	8	"Steve the Fearless Pilot"	Ashley J. Long	Christopher Vane	November 4, 2014	3RAG08	0.84
Steve uses hypnosis to rid of his fear of flying, but the Chinese hypnotist's thick accent ends up turning Steve into a swashbuckling pirate who fights back against Woody and his wealthy, elitist friends. Meanwhile, Connie and Denzel get stranded on an island populated by lesbians -- and Denzel discovers why the natives are worshipping Connie as a goddess.
32	9	"High Stakes"	Bert Ring	Eric Goldberg & Peter Tibbals	November 11, 2014	3RAG09	0.88
Woody befriends Brickleberry's corrupt, Rob Ford-esque mayor (voiced by John DiMaggio) and loses the park in a poker game, which the mayor wants to use as a hunting ground. Meanwhile, Ethel discovers that Malloy is a rare species of bear and flies in another bear so they can mate, while Steve tries to lose weight.
33	10	"Amber Alert"	Matthew Long	Rocky Russo & Jeremy Sosenko	November 18, 2014	3RAG10	0.88
Ethel's role at the park is jeopardized when Woody hires a ditzy, yet attractive new ranger named Amber (voiced by Tara Strong) over a competent hunk that Ethel wanted hired. Meanwhile, Denzel gets a new job on the park look-out and Steve discovers that all of his achievements in life were dependent on his mother having sex with the decision makers.
34	11	"Cops and Bottoms"	Ira Sherak	Roger Black & Waco O'Guin	March 31, 2015	3RAG11	0.66
Bored with the lack of crime in Brickleberry Park, Steve joins the police force and finds himself in over his head when he crashes his squad car into a biker bar and lets the bikers overrun the park so he can live. Meanwhile, Woody and Malloy travel to the Vatican after Woody discovers a hemorrhoid on his butt that has Jesus' face on it and is being worshipped by Mexican Catholics.
35	12	"Campin' Ain't Easy"	Spencer Laudiero & Matthew Long	Evan Shames	April 7, 2015	3RAG12	0.58
Woody reopens Brickleberry's Native American-themed summer camp, which closed 15 years ago due to Steve killing his campers during the camp's gauntlet challenge. While Steve tries to prove that he is capable of keeping his campers alive, Woody falls for a woman named Tiffany, who turns out to be a seventeen-year-old camper. Guest star: Eric the Actor originally voiced one of the disabled campers, but his lines were re-recorded by Roger Black due to worries over the quality of the audio.
36	13	"Global Warning"	Ashley J. Long	Roger Black & Waco O'Guin	April 14, 2015	3RAG13	0.58
Woody tries to create the biggest carbon footprint ever while Ethel counteracts his behavior by becoming Amish with Connie. Meanwhile, Steve develops psychic powers and Denzel tries to help Malloy overcome his fear of cows.

=== Crossover Special ===
No. overall	No. in season	Title	Directed by	Written by	Original release date
17	7	"Paradise PD Meets Brickleberry"	Brian Mainolfi	Waco O'Guin & Roger Black	March 6, 2020
After fleeing Paradise, the cast of Paradise PD take refuge in Brickleberry and help Ranger Woody to look for Malloy while making friendships with the other rangers.

== Ratings ==
Brickleberry : U.S. viewers per episode (millions)

Season	Episode number												
Season	1	2	3	4	5	6	7	8	9	10	11	12	13
1	1.68	1.49	1.69	1.05	1.58	1.43	1.30	1.09	1.31	1.33	–		
2	1.13	1.17	1.25	1.36	1.21	1.27	1.33	1.16	1.05	1.01	1.12	1.11	1.15
3	0.93	0.74	0.98	1.07	0.89	0.79	0.82	0.84	0.88	0.88	0.66	0.58	0.58

Audience measurement performed by Nielsen Media Research
