= Animated sitcom =

Subgenre of television show

An animated sitcom is a television sitcom that is primarily animated instead of being filmed in live action. The Simpsons, Family Guy, SpongeBob SquarePants, American Dad!, and South Park are five of the longest-running American animated sitcoms.

== History ==
=== Early history ===
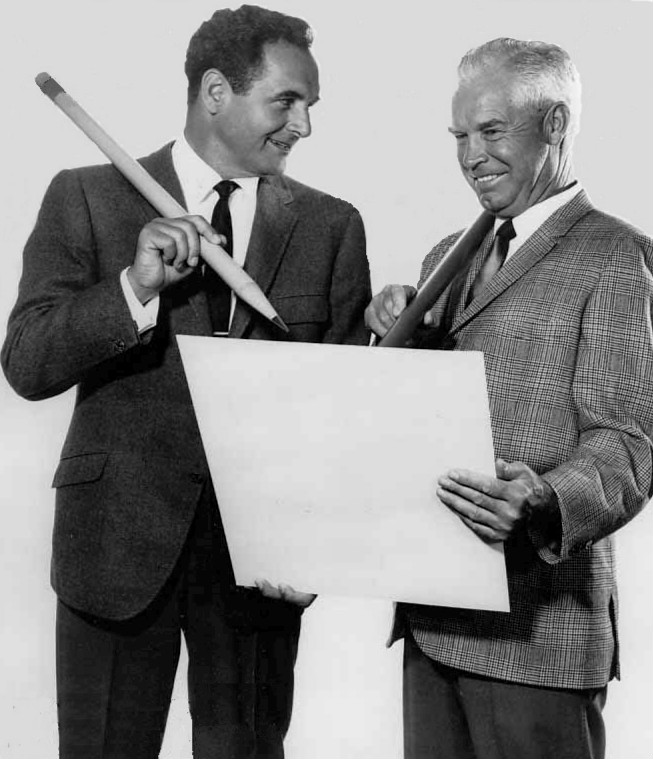
Photo of Bill Hanna (right) and Joe Barbera (left) in 1965; Hanna and Barbera were the co-creators of The Flintstones.

The Flintstones, which debuted in 1960, was the first example of the animated sitcom genre. A similar cartoon, The Jetsons, which took place in the future rather than the past, followed in 1962. Marc Blake argued it started the "science fiction sitcom sub genre".

Animated sitcoms have been more controversial than traditional cartoons from the onset. The Flintstones was originally oriented at parents, as an animated version of The Honeymooners, though it was primarily popular with children. David Bennett argued that when it was originally released, it was aimed at an adult audience, and called it the "direct ancestors" of current adult animation, because it covered adult subjects. Bennett stated that it specifically influenced The Simpsons, along with animations on Adult Swim and Netflix. His argument was confirmed by the fact that The Huckleberry Hound Show, another animated sitcom created by William Hanna and Joseph Barbera, became a "surprise hit with adult audiences." Even though some argued that The Flintstones later influenced The Simpsons, other scholars said that although the show caused a boom in primetime animation and "subverted conventional TV", the result would be driving animation out of primetime "for almost three decades". Despite this, scholar John Libbey argued that the show utilized "subversive qualities of animation."

From 1972 to 1974, Hanna-Barbera produced Wait Till Your Father Gets Home, an adult-oriented sitcom in the style of All in the Family. The series dealt with subjects such as feminism and the generation gap.

=== The Simpsons and expansion of the genre ===
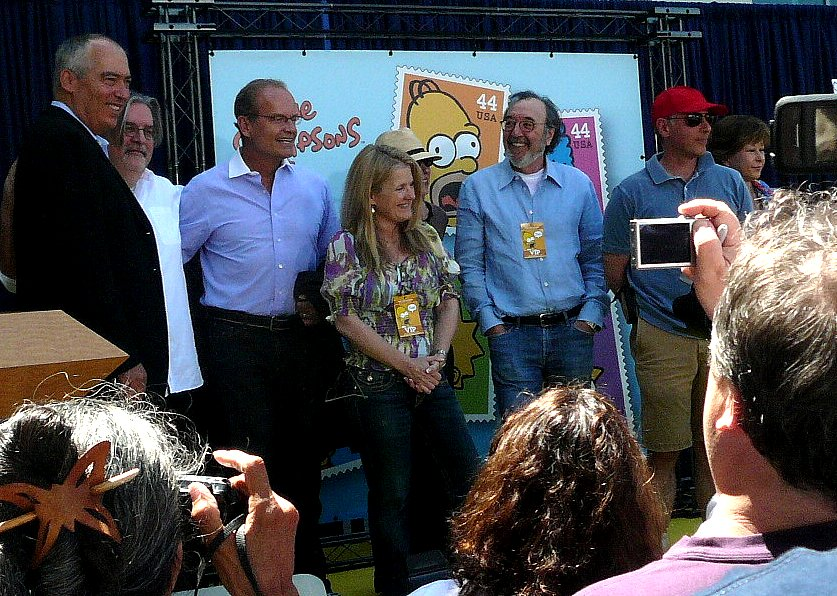
The Simpsons cast and crew at a stamp unveiling in Los Angeles, California, in May 2009

In the late 1980s and early 1990s, a number of animated television programs appeared which challenged the Standards & Practices guidelines, including The Simpsons, Beavis and Butt-Head, The Critic, Rocko's Modern Life, and Duckman. In 1987, The Simpsons shorts debuted on Fox's The Tracey Ullman Show. This show aired in prime time, meaning it was not self-censored as much as programs intended to air on Saturday mornings. As such, the show would have brief nudity and mild language, while dealing with mature themes and subjects such as death, gambling addiction, religion, and suicide. The first full-length episode, "Simpsons Roasting on an Open Fire", debuted on December 17, 1989. It is the first American animated sitcom not to have a laugh track, unlike other animated sitcoms prior. It remained the sole English-language mainstream adult-oriented animated sitcom until the 1990s, which saw the debuts of Beavis and Butt-Head, King of the Hill, South Park, Daria, Family Guy and Futurama. Some scholars argued that Matt Groening emulated the sci-fi genre shown in The Jetsons. Futurama would be complimented for its "intelligent, scientifically accurate, and humanized" approach to adventures, romances, and parodies of sci-fi. This included the growing relationship between Fry and Leela and an "alien relationship" (Kif and Amy).

John Evershed, formerly showrunner on Happy Tree Friends and current founder of Mondo Media, argued that the "enduring popularity" of this genre is a result of The Simpsons, a massive "animation franchise," and said this proves "the time-tested formula" of the genre works, even though it was "controversial" when it was released. Evershed also said that the show made clear that animation is "more than just kids content." Others also argued that the show marked a turning point in U.S. attitudes "toward cartoons written primarily for adult audiences" The Simpsons would later win the Guinness World Records award for "Longest-running animated sitcom (by episode count)." Chris Turner, author of Planet Simpson: How a Cartoon Masterpiece Documented an Era and Defined a Generation, argued that culture and events of 1990s "can all be understood through a Simpsons prism." Some critics argued that The Simpsons was responsible for "popularizing adult animation" while influencing "satirical cartoons" like South Park and Family Guy. Others even said that The Simpsons opened the "door for Cartoon Network's Adult Swim" and praised it for being "extremely unique and ... constantly evolving." Andrew J. Crow of Time magazine noted the influence of The Simpsons on adult animation, with Family Guy, King of the Hill, and Bob's Burgers, among others, featuring some version of the same structure, while "non-family-based shows" have drawn from "Matt Groening's hyper-referential style, irreverence and slapstick humor." He quoted Alex Hirsch, creator of Gravity Falls, as describing adult animation as an "arms race of different ways to copy The Simpsons." Two of Hirsch's friends from CalArts, Pendleton Ward (creator of Adventure Time) and J. G. Quintel (creator of Regular Show) were also inspired by The Simpsons. In 1989, The Simpsons began airing on Fox Broadcasting Company in prime time, becoming a massive hit among American audiences. In response, ABC, CBS and NBC each developed animated series to air in prime time, but none of the shows were successful. One series, Capitol Critters, focused on subjects such as gun control, interracial violence and political corruption. In his review of the series, Variety critic Brian Lowry wrote that he felt that the series' approach was "muddled", and that "the bland central character and cartoonish elements ... will likely be off-putting to many adults, who won't find the political satire biting enough to merit their continued attention. Similarly, kids probably won't be as smitten with the cartoon aspects or look". The series was cancelled after one month. The Critic was somewhat more successful, but achieved low ratings because of ABC's sporadic scheduling, and was cancelled by the network. Fox picked up the series, but cancelled it four months later. While Fox allowed The Simpsons to portray animated depictions of human buttocks, ABC would not allow similar scenes to appear on The Critic.

Others stated that it was not until the early 1990s that "cartoons specifically for adults" rather than children, did not come to "mainstream prominence" until after the success of The Simpsons, with Fox later airing King of the Hill and Family Guy both of which "generated massive audiences." As animation critic Reuben Baron described it, for a long time, "adult action/drama cartoons" were scarce on television, with only a "few cult hits and flops in the '90s", with almost nothing in the 2000s and more in the 2010s. Some critics called Duckman, based on a comic of the same, a "Simpsons-inspired sitcom" which had a pilot in 1991 and premiered in 1994 on the USA Network as part of the "network's Saturday night programming." The show features humans, animals, and hybrids of both intermingling, with "every design intentionally exaggerated and distorted", looking like the original comics, with theme music from Frank Zappa and set its sights on "1990s incarnations of political correctness and censorship", making it, a critic argued, a precursor to Family Guy and BoJack Horseman. As for King of the Hill, some noted it had the a great example of "young, adolescent love" within adult animation, specifically between Bobby and Connie. The show was also described as a "force for adult animation." In 1999, Family Guy debuted on Fox. The series was cancelled twice in the first three years, but became one of the network's longest-running series. It would later be praised for its humor, "cynical commentary, and sci-fi adventures" while having a sincere but tragic and real relationship between Brian and Pearl Burton.

Beavis and Butt-Head, which began airing in the early 1990s, another sitcom, was also controversial. This was due to its portrayal of brief nudity, profanity and violence. Although the series was intended for adult audiences, it was shown in the afternoons, and multiple parents claimed that their children had imitated the show's characters. After an incident, MTV responded by moving the series to a later airtime and adding disclaimers to future episodes stating explicitly not to imitate the actions of the characters, as well as removing all references to fire from the episodes. As Beavis and Butt-Head began entered its last season in 1997, a new adult animation began airing on MTV which was titled Daria. It would praised for its "progressive characters", sense of humor, and ability to capture absurdity of teen life in suburbs. Beginning around the same time was South Park. It became an "icon for anti-censorship and free speech" and was called "one of the most controversial shows on television."

In May 1995, another adult animated sitcom began airing on Comedy Central. It was titled Dr. Katz, Professional Therapist, featured the voice talents of Jonathan Katz, Jon Benjamin, and Laura Silverman, won a Peabody Award in 1998. and was animated in a crude, easily recognizable style produced with the software Squigglevision in which all persons and animate objects are colored and have constantly squiggling outlines, while most other inanimate objects are static and usually gray in color. Some critics stated that this series offered "plenty of cleverness and humor for those who looked", with funny lines, a unique style, and centered around "therapist discussions with real celebrities".

== 21st century ==
=== In the 2000s ===
In March 2000, the first few episodes of God, the Devil and Bob aired on NBC, with nine episodes unaired. The series didn't return until 2011, when the nine remaining episodes aired, from January to March 2011, on Adult Swim. Some said this was because Christian groups, like the American Family Association, had boycotted the network, and 17 NBC-affiliated stations agreed, leading to the show being stopped only after four episodes had aired. Even so, some religious leaders in the United Kingdom supported the show, and critics like Caryn James called it "a little risky" but "relatively benign" when compared to South Park, The Sopranos, and Sex and the City which aired at the time.

In June 2000, Kevin Smith criticized ABC over its animated sitcom, Clerks: The Animated Series, telling EW that they delivered the content but that ABC, and their corporate owner Disney Company, reneged on their promises, and called the show "dead" even though there were six episodes that had not aired. Six episodes of the show, based on Kevin Smith's 1994 comedy of the same title, were produced, but only two episodes aired before the show was cancelled by ABC.

While the pilot of Harvey Birdman, Attorney at Law first aired as a sneak peek on Cartoon Network on December 30, 2000, the series officially premiered on Adult Swim on September 2, 2001, the night the block launched. It ended on July 22, 2007, with a total of 39 episodes, over the course of four seasons. Later, in October 2018, a special, entitled Harvey Birdman: Attorney General, premiered, and a spin-off, Birdgirl, was ordered in May 2019, ultimately running from 2021 to 2022. Some described the series as funny, entertaining, zany, and amusing.

From August to October 2002, the final few episodes of The Oblongs, another adult animation, would air on Adult Swim after The WB did not air the last five episodes of the series. The latter, which some called a "stray gem in the early 2000s," was noted for the romance between a married couple, Bob and Pickles Oblong, who had a healthy relationship where both would "constantly support each other." In 2008, Usha M. Rodrigues and Belinda Smaill argued that bro'Town was a "home grown animated sitcom" that is comparable to The Simpsons.

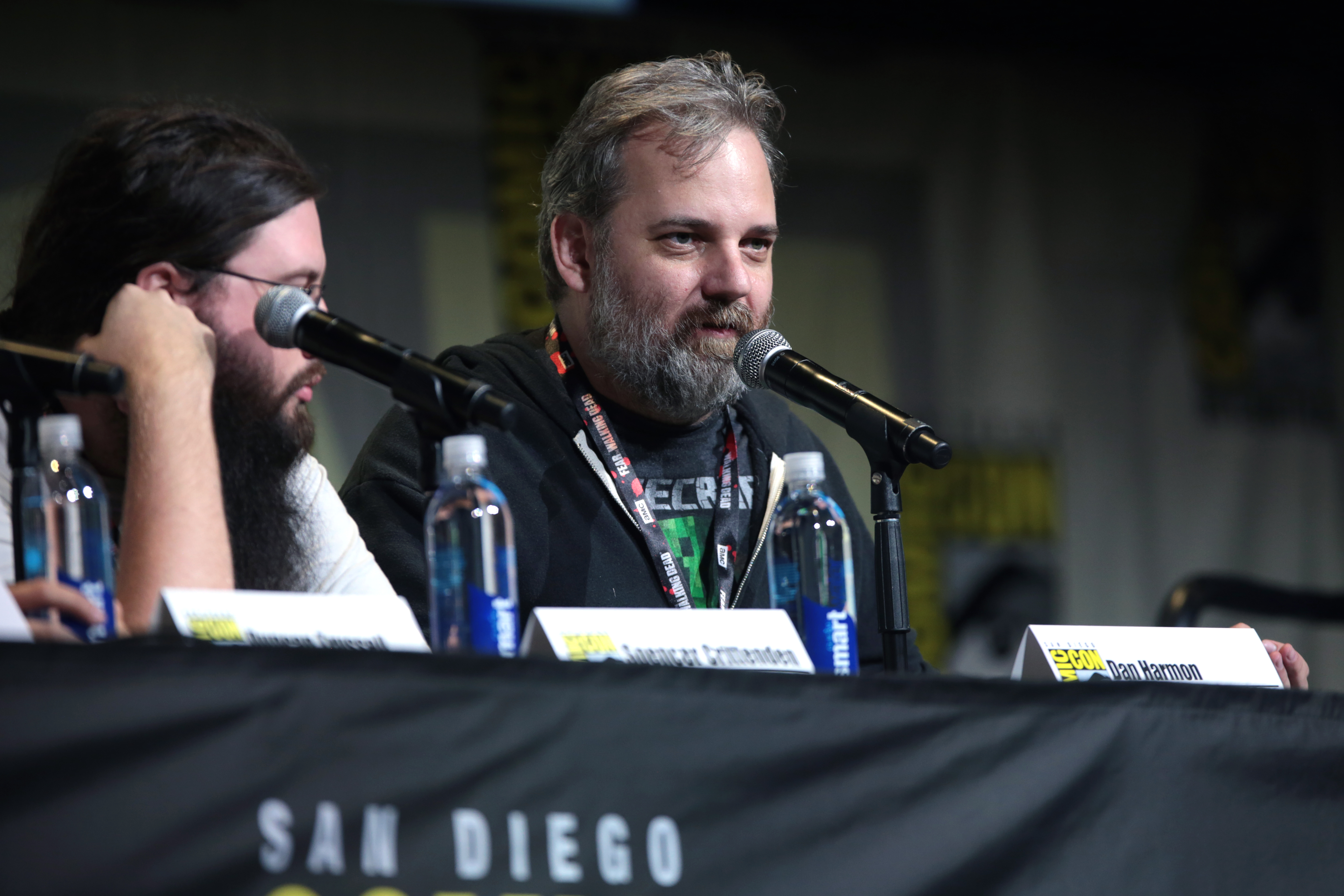
Dan Harmon, one of the creators of Rick and Morty, in July 2016

Adult animation became more popular, premiering critically acclaimed shows such as Drawn Together, Family Guy, American Dad!, Archer, Bob's Burgers, Rick and Morty, BoJack Horseman, F Is for Family, and Big Mouth. Some argued that animated sitcoms have formed some of the "most enduring and valuable franchises in the history of television," in terms of shows like Family Guy and South Park. These shows, and their subsequent franchises, were said to be part of a shift in the early 2010s toward adult animation, with darker and "more intricate animated comedies" such as Bojack Horseman and Rick and Morty released, with the latter reaching nine million viewers after the first season. Drawn Together, a parody of The Real World, which follows the misadventures of the housemates in the fictional show of the same name and uses a sitcom format with a reality TV show setting, was followed by a direct-to-video film and series finale titled The Drawn Together Movie: The Movie!. Another animated sitcom was Brickleberry which aired on Comedy Central from 2012 to 2015. It was created by Waco O'Guin and Roger Black, executive produced by O'Guin, Black, and comedian Daniel Tosh. It was later described as one of the "more vulgar adult-animation offerings" of the 2010s, with Kaitlin Olson only staying "for the first season as the female lead," voicing a "recently transferred Yellowstone ranger named Ethel." It was also said that show had a divided reception from critics but received favorably by audiences, who appreciated the show's "shameless sense of offensive humor and fast-paced writing."

Archer was said to be a "standard bearer" for adult animation and an "eclectic comedy" and praised for its "tight, fast-paced, and ever impressively intelligent dialogue," with a "power couple": Sterling Archer and Lana Kane. American Dad! was praised for breaking away from the "cynicism and formulas of its adult animation contemporaries" with the romance between Stan Smith and Francine said to be a wonderful romantic pair akin to Archie and Edith Bunker. Bob's Burgers was described as a welcome addition to the "Sunday lineup," with passionate relationship between Bob and Linda Belcher while maintaining a large audience. In November 2020, the show was approaching its 200th episode. and that Some reviewers called Drawn Together a "bizarre and highly entertaining series" which has a unique style of humor and "level of self-parody." Some reviewers would point to how the "foxhole humor" in Bob's Burgers has kept it going.

=== In the 2010s ===
In June 2011, two scholars analyzed queer characters and themes in animated sitcoms, arguing that they create "space for queer resistance," analyzing themes, and text, in the animated series Family Guy. They also argued that analyzing the show using postmodern thematic analysis, it creates "deconstructionist instances" that, in their view, "expose and subvert the hegemony of heteronormativity."

Allen Gregory had a short run in 2011 and was cancelled after the first season. This series featured Richard and Jeremy De Longpre, the fathers of the title character, Allen. Jeremy is a former social worker who had a loving wife and family, although this changed after Richard became one of his clients. Richard was attracted to Jeremy to the point where he started stalking him and his family until Jeremy finally agreed to be his husband. It is said that Jeremy is actually heterosexual but left his wife and children for Richard, who offered him an easy, no-maintenance life as his trophy husband. The following year, from January to December 2012, Unsupervised, an adult animated sitcom ran on FX. Although it was cancelled in November 2012 after one season, it was praised by critics as a coming-of-age story, with two clueless and ridiculous protagonists, while having "realistic looking backgrounds," contrasting with show's look in general.

Jeff & Some Aliens, an animated sitcom, aired on Comedy Central from January to March 2017. The plot surrounds three aliens who travel to Earth to find the most average person to test and understand humans. Most episodes revolve around Jeff having a problem that the aliens can fix with a strange device. In December 2017, the series was canceled after one season. It was described as being "a witty and fun stoner alien romp" which is a comedy akin to Rick and Morty.

Other animated sitcoms include Regular Show, Sanjay and Craig, Paradise PD, Tuca & Bertie, The Boondocks, The Loud House, and Momma Named Me Sheriff. Some series are on streaming platforms, as is the case with Disenchantment, Final Space, Solar Opposites, Central Park, the short-lived series, Hoops, and Q-Force. This positioned Netflix as a leader of adult animation content. The creator of Bojack Horseman, Raphael Bob-Waksberg, said that the show is about "ourselves looking outwards" and argued that the voice actor for Bojack, Will Arnett, can find the comedy in anything. Nasdaq argued that shows like Disenchantment were "original content" which had helped Netflix "dominate the online video streaming market," and said that demand for original content will allow Netflix to expand its base of subscribers. This allowed Netflix to gain allegiance of smaller, but more fervent, fanbases, which garnered a wide viewership.

Some critics noted that The Simpsons is not the only model for such animation, due to new shows coming to TV and streaming platforms like BoJack Horseman, Big Mouth, Rick and Morty and Undone, which some call a boom at the time that "high-quality adult animation shows" are being produced in France, Japan, and in other parts of the world, a new group of creators is pushing existing boundaries. Even so, fans of The Simpsons turned Hulu into a popular streaming hub.

Critics praised Tuca & Bertie and Solar Opposites for their take on humor and comedy. Shaurya Thapa of Screen Rant argued that Tuca & Bertie offered "a fresh and realistic take on the sitcom formula" while Rafael Motomoyer of Collider argued that Solar Opposites not only mixes "crude humor and knack for violence ... with a long-standing tradition of animated sitcoms" centered on a family, but it gives a "new take on the typical American family." Some described The Boondocks as profound, comedic, smart, silly, has social commentary on class relations, racism, and with a unique animation style. Some said that Apple TV+'s Central Park was one of the best shows of 2020 and described it as the network's "first foray into adult animation."

Certain comedians have created their own animated sitcoms. This includes the ongoing series, Duncanville, is airing on FOX, co-created by Amy Poehler, Mike Scully, and Julie Thacker. Poehler said the series is inspired by The Simpsons. Another animated sitcom on Fox, Bless the Harts, starred Kristen Wiig, and was created by former Saturday Night Live staff writer, Emily Spivey.

A September 2018 report by AT&T, using Google Trends, identified the most popular animated sitcoms in each U.S. state. They found that South Park is popular in Colorado, The Simpsons is popular in Oregon and Massachusetts, Family Guy popular in Connecticut, and King of the Hill popular in Kentucky and Tennessee. The report also stated The Simpsons and South Park are the two most popular animated sitcoms, while Rick and Morty is among the "most watched cable television series."

Also in 2018, the Canadian sitcom Corner Gas was adapted into a cartoon, Corner Gas Animated, which became the most-watched series premiere on CTV Comedy Channel and lasted for four seasons. The series featured cameos from Canadian Prime Minister Justin Trudeau, astronaut Chris Hadfield, Ryan Reynolds, Michael J. Fox, and Arcade Fire.

In 2019, it was announced that a writer for Disenchantment, Shion Takeuchi, would be heading her own upcoming Netflix show titled Inside Job, with Alex Hirsch as an executive producer, With a woman named Alma as the protagonist, Takeuchi said she hoped it would "push the boundaries" of adult animation. Hirsch was also quoted as noting that adult animation is changing, saying that it can be something that is "sophisticated, dramatic, beautiful and nuanced" rather than "crass and cruel."

=== 2020s to present ===
In January 2020, TZGZ, Syfy's new adult animation block, ordered six 15-minute episodes of Magical Girl Friendship Squad. At the same time, the short-form version, Magical Girl Friendship Squad: Origins, began airing on the same late-night programming block.

In February 2020, Fox released an animated sitcom produced by Seungyong Ji and Jordan Grief titled Duncanville, focusing on the story of a kid who "daydreams of making it big without having to wear a suit and tie to do so."

In September 2020, Magical Girl Friendship Squad began airing on SYFY. In interviews the same month, series creator Kelsey Stephanides hoped that the series would expand the "types of new animated stories" with more variety in adult animation, allowing for "different ways" to do adult animation in the future.

In December 2020, Hoops was cancelled by Netflix after its first season received low ratings and negative reviews. Hoops was described as "puerile comedy... perfect for Trump's America," not funny, and "crude, rude, and aimless."

On January 15, 2021, the first part of season 2 of Disenchantment was released on Netflix. In February 2021, it was announced that Tyler, the Creator had teamed up with Lionel Boyce and Davon 'Jasper' Wilson to develop an animated comedy named Shell Beach. In March 2021, it was reported that King of the Hill would be revived, with characters aging 15 years from the end of the series.

HouseBroken, an animated sitcom following the lives of anthropomorphic neighbourhood pets in therapy, first aired in May 2021. The series starred the voice of Lisa Kudrow as a poodle therapist with a second season premiering in December 2022. Low ratings led to the series' cancellation after two seasons.

The Harper House followed Debbie Harper, the matriarch and bread-winner of a down-on-their-luck family in Arkansas, and had a ten week, one series run on Paramount+ premiering in September 2021.

In April 2023, Adult Swim launched Royal Crackers an animated sitcom centred on a family owned snack-food company. A second series aired in February 2024.

Krapopolis premiered in September 2023 on Fox, having been commissioned for a further two seasons before its launch. The series is set in mythical Ancient Greece and features a dysfunctional family of humans gods and monsters including the voices of Richard Ayoade and Matt Berry. The fourth and fifth seasons have also been commissioned.

== Sources ==
- Erickson, Hal (2005). Television Cartoon Shows: An Illustrated Encyclopedia, 1949 Through 2003 (2nd ed.). McFarland & Co. ISBN 978-1-4766-6599-3.
- Evershed, John (2021). The "Great Adult Animation Boom" is in Full Swing (PDF) (Report). High Concentrate, LLC in Squarespace. Archived from the original (PDF) on April 28, 2021.
