= Farzar =

2022 American adult animated comedy streaming television series

- Genre: Adult animation; Animated sitcom; Science fiction
- Created by: Waco O'Guin; Roger Black
- Voices of: Dana Snyder; Lance Reddick; David Kaye; Kari Wahlgren; Jerry Minor
- Composers: Alejandro Valencia; Rene Garza Aldape
- Country of origin: United States
- Original language: English
- No. of seasons: 1
- No. of episodes: 10

Production
- Executive producers: Waco O'Guin; Roger Black; Scott Greenberg; Joel Kuwahara; Marc Provissiero
- Producers: Rocky Russo; Jeremy Sosenko; Amy Pocha; Seth Cohen
- Editor: Jeff Cannell
- Running time: 25–30 minutes
- Production companies: Netflix Animation Studios; Damn! Show Productions; Bento Box Entertainment; Odenkirk Provissiero Entertainment

Original release
- Network: Netflix
- Release: July 15, 2022

Related
- Brickleberry; Paradise PD

Farzar is an American animated sci-fi fantasy sitcom created by Waco O'Guin and Roger Black for Netflix. The series premiered on July 15, 2022, and stars Dana Snyder, Lance Reddick, Kari Wahlgren, David Kaye, Jerry Minor, Carlos Alazraqui, and Grey DeLisle. In 2023, season 2 was canceled on Netflix. A major contributing factor to this cancellation was the death of actor Lance Reddick, who voiced Renzo.

== Premise ==
Farzar takes place on the planet Farzar, where the son of the villainous czar Renzo, Prince Fichael, has been placed in charge of the S.H.A.T. Squad. The team, consisting of him and his crew —the cyborg Scootie, conjoined twins Mal and Val Skullcrusher, and Farzar's top scientist Barry Barris— leave the protective dome of their city to protect the populace from the evil Bazarack.

== Characters ==
=== Main ===
- Renzo (voiced by Lance Reddick) — The corrupt and villainous czar of Farzar and the father of Prince Fichael, using various methods to maintain his hold over Farzar from brainwashing propaganda to outright murder. He also seeks to destroy the native residents of Farzar, resulting in his defeat by Fichael in the season 1 finale.
- Prince Fichael (voiced by Dana Snyder) — A well-meaning but unclever royal space warrior determined to protect Farzar with the help of his special crew, S.H.A.T., eventually forced to stop Renzo from executing genocide on the planet's native inhabitants.
  - Snyder also voices Bazarack Francine Finklestein, a yellow alien wizard who is trying to reclaim Farzar from Renzo, and Billy, a giant monster created by Barry Barris from various animal parts who is quite intelligent despite his simple-minded personality.
- Barry Barris (voiced by David Kaye) — An unhinged scientist with constant suicidal tendencies.
  - Kaye also voices Clitaris, Bazarack's second in command and voice of reason, and Gorpzorp, a three-eyed green alien mounted on a small robot who is constantly treated like a dog by Bazarack.
- Val and Mal Skullcruncher (voiced by Kari Wahlgren) — Conjoined twin sisters with contrasting personalities: Val being a kind and soft-spoken elementary school teacher, while Mal is a grizzled cyborg soldier who can be quite overprotective of her twin. The season 1 finale reveals that Val was forced to repress her emotions and be the good twin, ending up a murderous sociopath as she helps Renzo with Mal struggling against her before their body is split apart from a stray beam.
- Scootie (voiced by Jerry Minor) — A drug-addicted robot with an African-American accent and best friend to Fichael who is a member of S.H.A.T. Scootie was originally human before a series of mishaps gradually turned him into a cyborg before he becomes a complete robot at the end of the first episode, only keeping his cyborg status by letting Sal live on his body as his taint. He is the Farzar counterpart of Brickleberry main cast member Denzel Jackson.

=== Recurring ===
- Zobo (voiced by Carlos Alazraqui) — A chaotic member of the Chaos-Celot a species of aliens that looks like pink rabbits that feeds off misery before potentially unleashing an apocalypse once absorbing enough energy. He makes a cameo appearance in the final season of Paradise PD.
  - Alazraqui also voices Sal Skullcruncher, Val and Mal's wisecracking, lesser-known underdeveloped conjoined twin brother who is literally cut off and now serves as Scootie's taint.
- Flobby (voiced by Waco O'Guin) — One of the two types of Intellectoid, a member of a race of blue aliens that reproduce through a heavy censored method. He bears the resemblance of Bobby Possumcods from Brickleberry and Robbie Hick from Paradise PD (both of whom O'Guin also voiced), making cameo appearances in the latter show's final season.
- Belzert (voiced by Roger Black) — One of the two types of intellectoid who bears a resemblance to BoDean Lynn from Brickleberry and Delbert Hick from Paradise PD (both of whom Black also voiced), making cameo appearances in the latter show's final season.
- Queen Flammy (voiced by Grey Griffin) — The mother of Prince Fichael, who spoils him rotten.

== Production ==
=== Development ===
On January 29, 2021, it was announced that Brickleberry and Paradise PD co-creators Waco O'Guin and Roger Black had made a multi-year deal with Netflix to produce various content for the streaming platform and its new in-house animation studio Netflix Animation. The animation for the series is done by Bento Box Atlanta using Toon Boom Harmony. With parts being outsourced to Copa Studio in Brazil, Mighty Animation in Mexico and NE4U in South Korea. Production on the series began with the first season consisting of ten episodes and with Black and O’Guin serving as showrunners and executive producers for the series. The series premiered on July 15, 2022.

=== Casting ===
Alongside the initial series announcement, it was reported that Lance Reddick, Dana Snyder, Grey Griffin, David Kaye, Kari Wahlgren, Jerry Minor, and Carlos Alazraqui had been cast in series regular roles.

== Episodes ==
No.	Title	Directed by	Written by	Original release date
1	"Welcome to Farzar"	Brian Mainolfi	Waco O'Guin & Roger Black	July 15, 2022
Defying orders, Fichael leads his newly formed squad of misfits on a mission to kill Bazarack — and learns something disturbing about his dad.
2	"Robot Revolution"	Beth Wollman	Waco O'Guin & Roger Black	July 15, 2022
Scootie gets banished to the Robot District and incites a rebellion against humans. Bazarack plans an attack on Dome City but wants to do it in style.
3	"Save the Reaper Demons"	Ashley J. Long	Waco O'Guin & Roger Black	July 15, 2022
Renzo and the squad get trapped in Fichael's reaper demon sanctuary. Bazarack tries to earn back his driver's license so he can show off his sweet ride.
4	"St. Pudchuggers Day"	Brian Mainolfi	Waco O'Guin & Roger Black	July 15, 2022
Renzo tries to get out of an annual lovemaking marathon with Flammy. Fichael woos Val, and Billy hopes to prove Zobo is a harbinger of chaos.
5	"The Adventures of Daddy O'Baggins"	Beth Wollman	Waco O'Guin & Roger Black	July 15, 2022
Renzo meets an alien porn star. Acting czar Fichael allows aliens inside the city, including Bazarack, who becomes addicted to the humans' luxuries.
6	"Flammily Reunion"	Joey Adams	Waco O'Guin & Roger Black	July 15, 2022
Flammy's relatives visit for Fichael's royal ceremony. Bazarack tries to convince several retirees to hand over a web domain. Barry tries a dating app.
7	"Baz, Bangs, and Brains"	Brian Mainolfi	Waco O'Guin & Roger Black	July 15, 2022
A war hero challenges Bazarack in the alien election. Feeling insecure, Renzo tasks Barry with creating a way to detect negative thoughts about him.
8	"The Great and Powerful Ozner"	Beth Wollman	Dan Signer	July 15, 2022
Renzo decrees that their god, Ozner, has outlawed sex. Scootie hooks Zobo on Snuffle Snarting. Bazarack fears the wrath of Harold the serial killer.
9	"Memory Wars"	Ashley J. Long & Pete Michels	Rocky Russo & Jeremy Sosenko	July 15, 2022
Fichael learns something shocking about his childhood memories. Flammy and Bazarack begin an affair. Scootie wants Barry to gather his human parts.
10	"War and Peace"	Brian Mainolfi	Waco O'Guin & Roger Black	July 15, 2022
Bazarack unites the alien clans to attack the humans. Val reaches her breaking point. Barry tries to cure Zobo of his chaos addiction.

== Release ==
On June 8, 2022, the first trailer for the series was released alongside the announcement that it would premiere on July 15, 2022.

== Graphic novel ==
On March 3, 2026, Kickstarter launched a fundraiser for a graphic novel of the Paradise PD/Farzar crossover and reached its goal of $20K in seven hours after the launch.

== Reception ==
Farzar received negative reviews from critics and audiences. Review aggregator Rotten Tomatoes gave an approval rating of 33% based on 6 reviews, with an average rating of 5/10.

Clint Worthington of RogerEbert.com called it "One of the Worst Animated Shows in Years". Joel Keller of Decider wrote that it "could be a good show, but unless you’re a big fan of dick jokes […] you’re not going to find a lot to laugh at with this show." Marty Brown of Common Sense Media gave the show one star out of five, saying that "an edgy sci-fi cartoon aims for shock value (and misses)."
