= Jerry Minor =

American actor and comedian

- Born: Jerome Charles Minor Jr. Memphis, Tennessee, U.S.
- Occupations: Actor; comedian; writer
- Years active: 1990–present

Jerome Charles Minor Jr. is an American actor, comedian, and writer known for his comedic roles in numerous television programs such as Abbott Elementary, Mr. Show, Saturday Night Live, Trigger Happy TV, Delocated, Brickleberry, Unbreakable Kimmy Schmidt, Crossballs, The Hotwives of Orlando, Carpoolers, Community, The Office, Lucky Louie, and Dr. Ken.

== Life and career ==
Minor was born in Memphis, Tennessee, and grew up in Flint, Michigan. Minor was raised as a Jehovah's Witness during most of his youth. Later in life, after rejecting his Jehovah's Witness upbringing, Minor was shunned by some members of his family. He began doing stand-up comedy and writing/performing with sketch comedy groups in Detroit before eventually joining the Second City Detroit's mainstage improv troupe. After writing and performing in three revues, he joined the Second City Chicago for two shows and then one revue at the Second City Toronto. At the time he was the only performer to have belonged to all three of the Second City's touring companies.

Minor was hired as a cast member and writer on Saturday Night Live for one season in 2000–2001. He was let go from the show over the summer hiatus, before the start of the 2001–2002 season, because Lorne Michaels wanted to hire four new cast members, but did not want to go over budget. Minor's best known work at SNL included the recurring sketch Rap Street (which he performed with Horatio Sanz) and his appearances on Weekend Update as Al Sharpton.

In addition to SNL, Minor has appeared regularly on a number of other sketch comedy programs, including HBO's Mr. Show, where he was a cast member during its final season. He was briefly a correspondent on The Daily Show in early 2000, had a recurring role as Officer Carter on Arrested Development and was one of the main cast members of Comedy Central's debate show parody Crossballs in 2004. He worked briefly as a writer and occasional performer on the short-lived FOX sketch series Cedric the Entertainer Presents.

In 2006, Minor was part of the main cast of the HBO series Lucky Louie, on which he played Louis C.K.'s neighbor, Walter. Minor was praised for his Lucky Louie role in a 2006 issue of TV Guide, where he was given a "Cheers" in the magazine's Cheers and Jeers section. He was part of the cast of the 2008 ABC sitcom Carpoolers, playing the role of Aubrey and was a featured comedian on Lewis Black's Root of All Evil on Comedy Central. Minor has also gained attention online in 2010, for his memorable appearances as "Cyber Thug" on the Comedy Bang Bang podcast, which was briefly spun off into its own podcast titled Cyber Thug Radio on the Earwolf network.

For a number of years Minor and comedian Craig Robinson had a comedy act where they performed as musical duo "L. Witherspoon & Chucky", with Minor as smooth singing "L. Witherspoon" and Robinson as "Chucky", the keyboard player and back-up singer. They performed the act on several stand-up shows on Comedy Central as well as on Real Time with Bill Maher and Jimmy Kimmel Live!.

Minor has appeared in films such as I Love You, Man, Drillbit Taylor and Beer League, and had a small part in the 2003 movie Melvin Goes to Dinner directed by Bob Odenkirk.

Minor has made guest appearances on shows such as Curb Your Enthusiasm, Funny or Die Presents, Drunk History, The League, Nick Swardson's Pretend Time, Key & Peele, Jon Benjamin Has a Van, Last Man Standing, How I Met Your Mother, and Brooklyn Nine-Nine. In 2010, he co-starred as "Mighty Joe Jon the Black Blonde" in the second season of the Adult Swim series Delocated. Minor has also had recurring appearances on comedy programs such as The Office as Brandon, Eastbound & Down as Jamie Laing, Community as Jerry the Janitor, The Hotwives as Rodney, Unbreakable Kimmy Schmidt as Chris, and in the animated series Bob's Burgers as the voice of Officer Julia. He also co-starred as the voice of Denzel in the Comedy Central animated series Brickleberry.

Minor is now the co-host of The Cult Awareness Podcast that discusses Scientology and other subjects.

He stars as the lead in the satirical musical For the Love of a Glove, which portrays Michael Jackson's glove as a sentient being and the true cause of his many misfortunes.

Since 2022 Minor has had a recurring role in Abbott Elementary as Mr. Morton, the eighth-grade science teacher.

== Characters on SNL ==
- Grand Master Rap, co-host of the old-school rap music program Rap Street on BET.
- Terrell, the catty and effeminate security guard who works with conceited deskclerk Jackie (Maya Rudolph)
- Willy Sluggs, a magician who performs less-than-spectacular magic tricks on his show Willy Sluggs' Eye Poppers

== Celebrity impressions ==
- Cuba Gooding Jr. (on SNL)
- Jimi Hendrix (on SNL)
- Al Sharpton (on SNL)
- Miss Cleo (on SNL - cut sketch)
- Nipsey Russell (on SNL - cut sketch: shown in 2001 SNL Halloween Special)
- Puff Daddy (on VH1 Divas Live Aretha Franklin special)
- Billy Dee Williams (on Mr. Show DVD audio commentary')
- Bill Cosby (on Lucky Louie)
- Ja Rule (on Jimmy Kimmel Live!)
- Chris Tucker (on Primetime Glick and The Martin Short Show)
- Michael Winslow (on Showtime's The Offensive Show pilot)
- Joseph Kony (on PoliPopTV viral video)
- Boyd Tinsley (at UCB's The Midnight Show)
- Steve Harvey (at UCB's Comedy Death-Ray)
- Kanye West (at UCB's Comedy Death-Ray)
- Ben Carson (at UCB's Decision Election 2016 All-Star Clusterfuck)

== Filmography ==
=== Film ===
Year	Title	Role	Notes
2000	The Bogus Witch Project	Ted McKinsey	
2003	Melvin Goes to Dinner	Solly	
2004	Anchorman: The Legend of Ron Burgundy	Tino's Bassist	
2004	Wake Up, Ron Burgundy: The Lost Movie	Tino's Bassist	Direct to video
2005	Junebug	Scout	
2005	Son of the Mask	Shopkeeper	
2006	Artie Lange's Beer League	Tim	
2006	Let's Go to Prison	Breen Guard	
2008	Semi-Pro	Paul the DJ	Uncredited
2008	Drillbit Taylor	Arresting Police Officer	
2009	I Love You, Man	Barry's Buddy	
2009	Funny People	Himself	
2014	Someone Marry Barry	Taxi Driver	
2014	Break Point	Chair Umpire	
2014	Walk of Shame	Lt. Drier	
2016	The Wedding Party	Baker	

=== Television ===
Year	Title	Role	Notes
1996–1998	Mr. Show with Bob and David	Various roles	Recurring role, 12 episodes
2000–2001	Saturday Night Live	Various roles	Main cast Also writer, 20 episodes (Season 26)
2002–2003	Primetime Glick	Various roles	Recurring role
2002	Late Friday	Ronnie Reggie Robinson	1 episode
2002	Next!	Various roles	2 episodes
2003	Trigger Happy TV	Various roles	4 episodes
2003	Reno 911!	Robber	1 episode
2004	Crank Yankers	Ezekiel Magoo	1 episode
2004	Crossballs: The Debate Show	Various roles	Main role Also writer, 15 episodes
2004	Cheap Seats	Steamer Newsome	1 episode
2004–2013	Arrested Development	Officer Carter	Recurring role, 5 episodes
2006	Lucky Louie	Walter	Main role, 13 episodes
2007–2008	Carpoolers	Aubrey	Main role, 13 episodes
2008	Worst Week	Trevor	1 episode
2009–2010	SuperNews!	Various roles (voice)	Recurring role, 14 episodes
2010	The Cleveland Show	Bumble B (voice)	1 episode
2010	Delocated	Mighty Joe Jon	Main role, 12 episodes
2010–2011	Nick Swardson's Pretend Time	Various roles	2 episodes
2010–2011	Community	Jerry the Janitor	Recurring role, 6 episodes
2010–2013	Eastbound & Down	Jamie Lang	Recurring role, 4 episodes
2011	Bob's Burgers	Officer Julia (voice)	3 episodes
2011	Jon Benjamin Has a Van	Mayor Michael Lewis	1 episode
2011	Curb Your Enthusiasm	Bob	1 episode
2011	How I Met Your Mother	King Charles	Episode: "Tick Tick Tick"
2012	Last Man Standing	Mel	1 episode
2012	The Office	Brandon	2 episodes
2012	Key & Peele	Various roles	2 episodes
2012	Brickleberry	Denzel Jackson (voice)	Main role, 36 episodes
2013	NTSF:SD:SUV::	Reggie	1 episode
2013	Brooklyn Nine-Nine	Jerry Grundhaven	1 episode
2014	Drunk History	E. D. Nixon	1 episode
2014	The Hotwives	Rodney	Recurring role, 7 episodes
2014	The League	Greg	1 episode
2014	Newsreaders	George Dillard	1 episode
2014	Mulaney	Murphy	1 episode
2014–2016	Comedy Bang! Bang!	Various roles	Recurring role, 8 episodes
2015	Unbreakable Kimmy Schmidt	Chris Darden	3 episodes
2015	Black-ish	Lance	1 episode
2015–2016	The Grinder	Principal Davis	2 episodes
2016	Bajillion Dollar Propertie$	Brentyl	1 episode
2016	The Jim Gaffigan Show	Male Nurse	1 episode
2016	Blunt Talk	Detective	3 episodes
2016–2017	Dr. Ken	Eric	Recurring role, 7 episodes
2017	The Goldbergs	Professor Dixon	1 episode
2018	Superior Donuts	Officer Jackson	1 episode
2018	Detroiters	Jefferson Porger	1 episode
2018	Big Mouth	Man #3/Singing Fish (voice)	1 episode
2019	Those Who Can't	Steven Sweeney	Recurring role, 8 episodes
2019	Historical Roasts	Martin Luther King Jr.	1 episode
2019	Superstore	Richard	1 episode
2020	Paradise PD	Denzel (voice)	1 episode
2021	Special	Funeral Director	1 episode
2021	The Sex Lives of College Girls	Whitney's Dad (voice)	1 episode
2022	American Auto	Steve	1 episode
2022	Home Economics	Richard	1 episode
2022	Farzar	Scootie (voice)	Main role, 10 episodes
2022–present	Abbott Elementary	Mr. Morton	Recurring role, 21 episodes
2023	History of the World, Part II	Bolsheviks II Mensheviks Singer	1 episode

=== Video games ===
Year	Title	Role	Notes
2026	Grand Theft Auto VI	The Local Population	
