= David Herman =

American comedian and actor (born 1967)

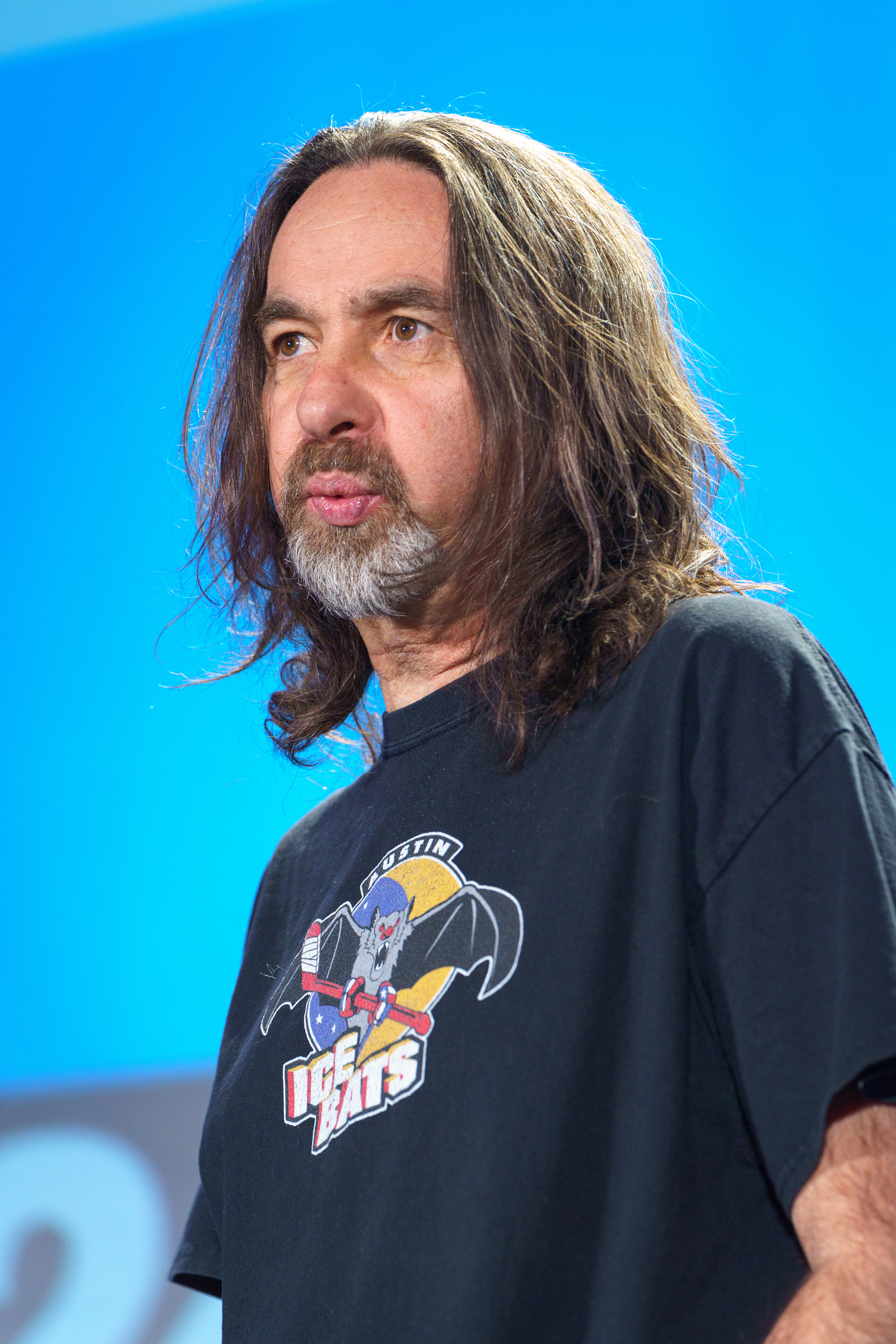
- Herman at SXSW 2024
- Born: February 20, 1967 (age 59); New York City, New York, U.S.
- Education: State University of New York, Purchase (BFA)
- Occupations: Actor; comedian
- Years active: 1989–present
- Spouse: Christi Campbell (divorced)
- Children: 2

David Herman (born February 20, 1967) is an American actor and comedian. He was an original cast member on MADtv from 1995 to 1997 and played Michael Bolton in Office Space.

He has done voice-over work in hundreds of episodes of King of the Hill, Futurama, American Dad!, Bob's Burgers, Brickleberry, Invader Zim, OK K.O.! Let's Be Heroes, Disenchantment, The Great North, and Paradise PD.

== Early life ==
Herman was born in New York City and raised in Washington Heights, Manhattan. He graduated from the Fiorello H. LaGuardia High School of Music & Art and Performing Arts in 1985, then attended the acting program at SUNY Purchase.

== Career ==
=== Early acting roles ===
Herman had appeared in the films Born on the Fourth of July, Lost Angels, and Let It Be Me.

=== MADtv ===
Herman in 2018

Herman was part of the cast of John Leguizamo's short-lived series House of Buggin' in 1995. When Fox canceled the series to replace it with a sketch comedy show, Herman signed on as one of nine original cast members of MADtv when the series began in 1995.

Herman's MADtv characters included Mike Lawson (Incredible Findings), Generation X anchorman Marsh (X News), and concerned father Joel Linder.

Herman lampooned celebrities and famous figures such as Don Adams (as Maxwell Smart from Get Smart), Tim Allen (as Tim Taylor from Home Improvement), Woody Allen, Nicolas Cage, Bill Clinton, Bob Dole, David Duchovny (as Fox Mulder from The X-Files), Larry Flynt, Tom Hanks (as Forrest Gump and as Jim Lovell from Apollo 13), Larry King, Kenny Kingston, Regis Philbin, Charles Nelson Reilly, John Ritter (as himself and as Jack Tripper from Three's Company), Joel Schumacher, Robert Shapiro, Pauly Shore, Brent Spiner, Patrick Stewart (as Jean-Luc Picard from Star Trek: The Next Generation), and Alex Trebek.

Herman stayed with the show until six episodes into the third season. When speaking about the show in 2019, he said that he wanted to leave the show to do other projects, but Fox would not let him out of his contract, as they considered him too valuable, so he got himself fired by screaming all his lines during read-through. While continuing his voice work on King of the Hill, he came across the script for Office Space, which Hill creator Mike Judge had written with Herman in mind for the part of Michael Bolton.

=== Other television projects ===
Herman's television credits include guest-starring on the WB's Angel and Fox's action drama 24.

=== Film projects ===
Though primarily a television actor, Herman has appeared in several films, including Dude, Where's My Car? and Fun with Dick and Jane. He had a prominent role in the 1999 comedy Office Space as a gangsta rap-loving nerd named Michael Bolton who must endure questions about his relationship to the famous singer. In 2006, he appeared in another Mike Judge film, Idiocracy.

=== Voice acting ===
Herman is also known for his work as a voice actor in cartoons and video games, notably in Futurama, where he provides the voices of many recurring characters (including Scruffy, Planet Express's janitor; Roberto, the deranged criminal robot obsessed with stabbing people; New New York City Mayor Poopenmeyer, and Professor Farnsworth's former student and current rival Ogden Wernstrom), and King of the Hill, on which he voiced Luanne's ill-fated boyfriend, Buckley, as well as several one-shot and incidental characters.

Herman's other voice work include additional roles in American Dad!, Nickelodeon's short-lived animated series Invader Zim, the short-lived CGI-animated sitcom Father of the Pride (in which he voices Roy Horn), and the Jak and Daxter video game series. Herman starred as Ubuntu Goode (and other supporting voices) on Judge's short-lived companion series to King of the Hill, The Goode Family. He provides the voice for Mr. Frond and other supporting voices on Fox's Bob's Burgers; Mr. Gar, Brandon, and others on Cartoon Network's OK K.O.! Let's Be Heroes; The Herald and various characters on Matt Groening's Netflix series Disenchantment; incompetent park ranger Steve Williams on Comedy Central's Brickleberry; and Kevin Crawford on Paradise PD.

== Filmography ==
=== Film ===
Year	Title	Role	Notes
1989	Lost Angels	Carlo	
1989	Born on the Fourth of July	VA in Hospital	
1997	Kirk and Kerry	Dave	Short film
1998	Gunshy	Dan	
1999	Olive, the Other Reindeer	Guard Shack Elf (voice)	
1999	Office Space	Michael Bolton	
2000	Shriek If You Know What I Did Last Friday the Thirteenth	Mr. Lowelle Buchanan	Direct-to-video
2000	Dude, Where's My Car?	Nelson	
2000	Table One	Norman	
2000	Monsignor Martinez	John Smith	
2005	The Lather Effect	Corey	
2005	Kicking & Screaming	Referee	
2005	Fun with Dick and Jane	Angry Caller (voice)	
2006	Idiocracy	Secretary of State	
2007	Bee Movie	Buzz, Bob Bumble, Pilot (voice)	
2007	Futurama: Bender's Big Score	Nudar, Scruffy, Turanga Morris, Terry, additional voices	Direct-to-video
2008	Futurama: The Beast with a Billion Backs	Ogden Wernstrom, Mayor Poopenmeyer, Pazuzu, Chu, Fatbot, Warden Vogel, additional voices	Direct-to-video
2008	Futurama: Bender's Game	Larry, Roberto, Scruffy, Turanga Morris, Ogden Wernstrom, additional voices	Direct-to-video
2009	Futurama: Into the Wild Green Yonder	Number 9 Man, Scruffy, Michael, additional voices	Direct-to-video
2013	Bad Milo	Ralph (voice)	
2013	I Know That Voice	Himself	Documentary
2016	Storks	Additional voices	
2017	Best Fiends: Boot Camp	Roger (voice)	Short film
2017	Best Fiends: Visit Minutia	Roger (voice)	Short film
2018	Best Fiends: Fort of Hard Knocks	Gordon (voice)	Short film
2018	Best Fiends: Baby Slug's Big Day Out	Gordon (voice)	Short film
2019	Scooby-Doo! and the Curse of the 13th Ghost	Sheriff (voice)	Direct-to-video
2019	Scooby-Doo! Return to Zombie Island	Sheriff, Jack (voice)	Direct-to-video
2020	Happy Halloween, Scooby-Doo!	Sheriff (voice)	Direct-to-video
2022	The Bob's Burgers Movie	Mr. Frond (voice)	
2022	Beavis and Butt-Head Do the Universe	Gage, German Tourist, Jail Warden (voice)	
2023	Strays	Underbite Pound Dog (voice)	

=== Television ===
Year	Title	Role	Notes
1995	House of Buggin'	Various	Main cast
1995–1997	MADtv	Various roles	Main cast (Seasons 1–3)
1997–2010; 2025–present	King of the Hill	Buckley, Jimmy Wichard, various characters (voice)	Recurring role
1999–2003; 2008–2013; 2023–present	Futurama	Scruffy, Roberto, Larry, Ogden Wernstrom, Turanga Morris, Mayor Poopenmeyer, various characters (voice)	Recurring role (Seasons 1–4); Main cast (Season 5–present)
2000	Angel	David Nabbit	3 episodes
2001	Primetime Glick	Various	2 episodes
2001–2003	Invader Zim	Additional voices	7 episodes
2003	Life on Parole	Dave	Television film
2003, 2008	ChalkZone	Generic Man (voice)	3 episodes
2004	24	Dalton Furrelle	2 episodes
2004	Grounded for Life	Dave "J.J. Bodybuddy", Lomax	2 episodes
2004	Father of the Pride	Roy Horn (voice)	Main cast
2006–present	American Dad!	Various characters (voice)	
2008	Moral Orel	Principal Fakey, additional voices	Season 3 only
2008–2009	The Drinky Crow Show	Uncle Gabby, Captain Maak (voice)	Main cast
2009	The Goode Family	Ubuntu Goode (voice)	Main cast
2011–present	Bob's Burgers	Mr. Phillip Frond, Trev, Marshmallow (Seasons 1–8), various characters (voice)	Recurring role
2011	Beavis and Butt-Head	Additional voices	4 episodes
2012	Family Guy	David Strathairn (voice)	Episode: "Tom Tucker: The Man and His Dream"
2012–2015	Brickleberry	Steve Williams, various characters (voice)	Main cast
2013	Lakewood Plaza Turbo	Mr. Gar, Brandon (voice)	Pilot for OK K.O.! Let's Be Heroes
2014–2016	TripTank	Various characters (voice)	12 episodes
2014, 2025	The Simpsons	Scruffy, Clincher (voice)	Episodes: "Simpsorama" and "Thrifty Ways to Thieve Your Mother"
2015	Ridin' with Burgess	Duzenthal, Narrator (voice)	Pilot
2015	The Awesomes	Pharaoh, additional voices	9 episodes
2016	Better Things	Richard	Episode: "Sam/Pilot"
2017	Jeff & Some Aliens	Zib Zog's Father, Host (voice)	Episode: "Jeff & Some Honer Killings"
2017	Adventure Time	Randy (voice)	Episode: "Ring of Fire"
2017	Tarantula	Additional voices	3 episodes
2017–2019	OK K.O.! Let's Be Heroes	Mr. Gar, Brandon, Jethro, Beardo, additional voices	Main cast
2018–2023	Disenchantment	Jerry, The Herald, Chazzzzz, Guysbert, various characters (voice)	Main cast
2018–2022	Paradise PD	Kevin Crawford, various characters (voice)	Main cast
2018	BoJack Horseman	Arnold Schwarzenegger (voice)	Episode: "BoJack the Feminist"
2019–2021	Bless the Harts	Peter, additional voices	Recurring role
2020–2022	Central Park	Dmitry, various characters (voice)	Recurring role
2021–2025	The Great North	Santiago Carpaccio, Gill Beavers, additional voices	Recurring role
2022	Space Force	Albertson (voice)	Episode: "Budget Cuts"
2022	Farzar	Principal Carter, additional voices	Episode: "Robot Revolution"
2022	Slippin' Jimmy	Roger, Warren, Seth (voice)	2 episodes
2024	Everybody Still Hates Chris	Additional voices	2 episodes
2026	President Curtis	Ghost of Abraham Lincoln (voice)	Episode: "Ghosts"

=== Video games ===
Year	Title	Voice role
2001	Jak and Daxter: The Precursor Legacy	Sculptor, Boggy Billy
2003	Futurama	Larry, Adoy, Ra-Ra the Sun King
2003	Jak II	Errol, Krimzon Guards
2004	Jak 3	Errol, Ottsel Surfer, Ottzel Dummy
2005	Jak X: Combat Racing	Razer, Ximon, Thugs
2006	Daxter	Ximon, Tik, Errol, Krimzon Guard, Miner
2016	Futurama: Worlds of Tomorrow	Scruffy, Leg Mutant, Malfunction Eddie
2018	OK K.O.! Let's Play Heroes	Mr. Gar, Brandon
2022	High on Life	Gene Zaroothian
2026	High on Life 2	Gene Zaroothian

=== Web ===
Year	Title	Role	Notes
2000	Zombie College	Scott Bardo (voice)	Main cast
2025	Guys Next Door	Wooze, Richie (voice)	Pilot
2026	My Friend Coffee	Kevin (voice)	
