= Happy Thoughts =

Live album by Daniel Tosh
- Released: March 8, 2011
- Recorded: June 2010
- Genre: Stand-up
- Length: 59:00
- Label: Comedy Central
- Producer: Daniel Tosh

Daniel Tosh chronology
| Completely Serious (2007) | Happy Thoughts (2011) |

Happy Thoughts is the third comedy album released by comedian Daniel Tosh. The special originally aired on Comedy Central and was released independently on DVD. Daniel Tosh: Happy Thoughts is the follow-up to Tosh's DVD debut, Daniel Tosh: Completely Serious.

== Charts ==
| Chart (2011) | Peak position |
|---|---|
| US Billboard 200 | 28 |
| US Billboard Top Comedy Albums | 1 |
| US Billboard Top Digital Albums | 7 |
| US Billboard Top Independent Albums | 6 |

== Special features ==
- Comedy Central aired version
- Encore
- A Day in the Life
- Opening Acts: Jasper Redd and Matt Fulchiron
