= Crossballs: The Debate Show =

- Created by: Matt Besser; Charlie Siskel
- Starring: Chris Tallman
- Country of origin: United States
- Original language: English
- No. of seasons: 1
- No. of episodes: 24 (1 unaired)

Production
- Running time: 30 minutes

Original release
- Network: Comedy Central
- Release: July 6 – August 25, 2004

Crossballs: The Debate Show is a Comedy Central television show which poked fun at cable news networks' political debate shows, especially CNN's Crossfire and MSNBC's Hardball with Chris Matthews. In each episode, comedians posing as experts on a particular subject would debate two real commentators. The true experts were unaware that the show was a sham. Topics ranged from reality television to religion to violence in video games.

It debuted on July 6, 2004, and ran for eight weeks. It aired Tuesday-Friday at 7:30 p.m. ET. The twenty-third and final episode aired on August 25, 2004. Episode 24 ("Pistol Whipped America") was taped but never aired, after one unsuspecting guest named James March threatened to sue Comedy Central. A further legal threat came from radio comedian Phil Hendrie, who publicly accused the show's creators of stealing the concept of a show he pitched to Comedy Central in 1998, as well as that of The Phil Hendrie Show.

== Cast members ==
- Chris Tallman - Host of Crossballs
- Matt Besser - Fake Guest Debater
- Mary Birdsong - Fake Guest Debater
- Andrew Daly - Fake Guest Debater
- Jerry Minor - Fake Guest Debater
- Sean Conroy - Occasional Fake Guest Debater (3 episodes)
- Rich Fulcher - Occasional Fake Guest Debater (2 episodes)

== Episodes ==
No.	Title	Original release date
1	"Reality TV: No Survivors"	July 6, 2004
2	"Driving in America"	July 7, 2004
3	"Drugs"	July 8, 2004
4	"Vegetarian or Vegetarded"	July 13, 2004
5	"FCC or F-YOU-CC?"	July 14, 2004
6	"America vs. Aliens"	July 15, 2004
7	"Grand Theft Apocalypse"	July 20, 2004
8	"Fashion, Gay Conspiracy"	July 21, 2004
9	"Love Thy Gay-bor"	July 22, 2004
10	"Clones of Contention"	July 27, 2004
11	"Frat-tastic or Frat-tastrophe"	July 28, 2004
12	"Sports Stars: Monsters?"	July 29, 2004
13	"Tipping: Chinese City?"	August 3, 2004
14	"Makeovers for Jesus?"	August 4, 2004
15	"Flabulous or Fat-tastrophe?"	August 5, 2004
16	"Music in America"	August 10, 2004
17	"Healing Through Porno"	August 11, 2004
18	"Crime and Funishment"	August 12, 2004
19	"Plastic Surgery: Nip-pocalypse?"	August 17, 2004
20	"Hellphones vs. Interthreat"	August 18, 2004
21	"Mother Earth, Bitch"	August 19, 2004
22	"Voting Electible Dysfunction"	August 24, 2004
23	"Sex Battle USA"	August 25, 2004
24	"Pistol Whipped America"	unaired

== Notable real guests ==
- Chris Simcox - Minuteman Civil Defense Corps founder and spokesperson
- Wiley Drake - outspoken Southern Baptist evangelist
- Jackie Christie - wife of professional basketball player Doug Christie
