= Stankervision =

- Created by: Waco O'Guin; Roger Black
- Presented by: Yucko the Clown
- Starring: Roger Black; Greg Epps; Waco O'Guin; Zac Pope
- Composer: Sean Altman
- Country of origin: United States
- No. of seasons: 1
- No. of episodes: 8

Production
- Production companies: Damn! Show Productions; Mark Mark; MTV Production Development

Original release
- Network: MTV2
- Release: July 8, 2005 – January 26, 2006

Stankervision was a sketch-comedy program, created by Waco O'Guin and Roger Black that aired on MTV2. It premiered July 8, 2005 as part of the channel's "Sic 'Em Friday" programming block. Stankervision is a repackaged version of "The DAMN! Show", a sketch comedy show that was created in Athens, Georgia in 1998. Yucko the Clown, a character developed and played by Black, is featured on the show.

== Format ==
Among the regular sketches are Yucko the Clown approaching people on the street and insulting them with profanity and lewd gestures, mimes who start out acting like "normal" mimes, then turning to violent behavior (one such sketch, for example, has one mime making a withdrawal from an ATM, only to be held up and "shot" by a second mime, who in turn is accosted by two "police" mimes and beaten – all in the view of the public), and "Dear Stankervision", where questions are posed to the creators, Waco and Roger (one such "letter" asks how laxatives work, which is followed by actors in costume displaying the effects of taking pills to relieve constipation).

Stankervision also features some cartoons, but in Stankervision style. One regular such cartoon is about the adventures of "Inebriated the Koala", which was created by Waco O'Guin in 1993 and is introduced as "everyone's favorite eucalyptus-eating marsupial", to which the koala replies "Eucalyptus? You can lick THIS!" as he points to his crotch.

== Cancellation ==
On October 7, 2005, Howard Stern announced on his radio show that Stankervision was not picked up for a second season by MTV. Cast member Yucko the Clown e-mailed Stern confirming this, stating that the show had the highest ratings for that block of time on MTV2 and was not sure why the show was not picked up for a second season.

On January 26, 2006, Yucko stated on Stern's Sirius channel (on the post-show wrap-up program) that the show had been cancelled not because of its content, but problems with sponsors.

== Cast ==
- Roger Black
- Greg Epps
- Waco O'Guin
- Zac Pope
- Rack 'em Willie
