= Completely Serious =

Live album by Daniel Tosh
- Released: 2006
- Recorded: 2006
- Genre: Comedy
- Length: 60:00
- Label: Image Entertainment
- Producer: Daniel Tosh, Robert Hartman, Judi Brown-Marmel, Stu Schreiberg

Daniel Tosh chronology
True Stories I Made Up (2005)	Completely Serious (2007)	Happy Thoughts (2011)

Completely Serious is the second comedy album released by the comedian Daniel Tosh. The special originally aired on Comedy Central. Although originally airing as a Comedy Central Special, the live recording was released independently and is only available on DVD. Completely Serious is the follow-up to Tosh's CD debut, True Stories I Made Up.

== Special features ==
These are the special features that were on the DVD:

- Daniel's prank phone call to author Stephen King about Pet Sematary
- Daniel's post-show banter with fans
- 5 deleted scenes
- Daniel's apology to frigid old women who have more than five cats
- DVD cover shoot
- Daniel's hidden camera scenes from The Bunny Ranch
