= Jeremy Sosenko =

American screenwriter

Jeremy Sosenko (born 1978) is an American screenwriter, actor, improviser, and director, best known for contributing to writing the 2013 comedy Movie 43, and for writing for the cartoon TV show Brickleberry on Comedy Central. Sosenko was a writer and producer on Netflix's Paradise PD from 2018-2021.
