= Roger Black (actor) =

American actor

- Born: November 24, 1975 (age 50); United States
- Occupations: Actor; comedian; animator; writer; producer
- Notable work: Yucko the Clown, The Howard Stern Show, The DAMN! Show, Brickleberry, Paradise PD, Farzar

Comedy career
- Years active: 2002–present
- Medium: Stand-up, television
- Genres: Satire, observational comedy, insult comedy
- Subjects: Current events, American culture, pop culture, human sexuality, recreational drug use

Roger Black (born November 24, 1975) is an American actor, insult comedian, animator, writer and producer. He is best known for his portrayal of the character Yucko the Clown, a character he created in 2000 and officially retired in 2013.

With Waco O'Guin, he has created three adult animated comedy shows: Brickleberry (2012–2015), Paradise PD (2018–2022), and Farzar (2022).

== Career ==
Yucko first became a guest on The Howard Stern Show by carrying a Howard Stern sign onto the field during a major league baseball game. At the height of the D.C. sniper attacks in 2002, Roger, dressed as Yucko the Clown, carried a target as he pumped gas at various gas stations around the D.C. area. He later became a regular guest, appearing in the studio and eventually competing and becoming a finalist in the Get John's Job contest.

He is also known for starring in The DAMN! Show along with fellow writer Waco O'Guin and the MTV2 series Stankervision, which included sketches from The DAMN! Show and ran for one season of eight episodes.

O'Guin and Black's animated comedy series Brickleberry, executive-produced by Daniel Tosh, premiered on September 25, 2012, on Comedy Central. The series was canceled in January 2015 and ended in April of that year.

In 2018, Black and O'Guin created the Netflix animated series Paradise PD. In 2022, the duo created Farzar, also a Netflix adult animation series.
