= Brickleberry =

American adult animated comedy series

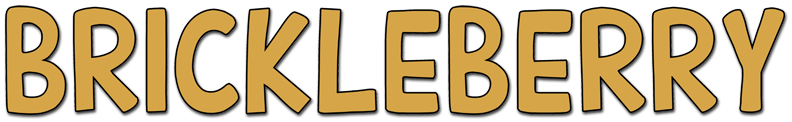
- Genre: Adult animation; Animated sitcom; Workplace comedy
- Created by: Roger Black; Waco O'Guin
- Voices of: Daniel Tosh; Kaitlin Olson; Roger Black; David Herman; Tom Kenny; Jerry Minor; Natasha Leggero
- Composers: Nicolas Barry; Tomas Jacobi; Rene Garza Aldape; Alejandro Valencia; Sean Altman
- Country of origin: United States
- Original language: English
- No. of seasons: 3
- No. of episodes: 36 (list of episodes)

Production
- Executive producers: Waco O'Guin; Roger Black; Daniel Tosh
- Editors: Chris Vallance; Andy Tauke
- Production companies: Damn! Show Productions; Black Heart Productions; Comedy Partners; Fox 21 Television Studios (Note: Credited as Fox 21 until the last 2 episodes of season 3)

Original release
- Network: Comedy Central
- Release: September 25, 2012 – April 14, 2015

Brickleberry is an American adult animated sitcom created by Waco O'Guin and Roger Black for the basic cable network Comedy Central, which aired from September 25, 2012 to April 14, 2015. Executive produced by O'Guin, Black, and comedian Daniel Tosh, the series follows a group of park rangers as they work through their daily lives in the fictional Brickleberry National Park. The show garnered mixed reviews from critics, but it has gained a cult following.

== Synopsis ==
The series follows a staff of misfit, under-qualified, and disinterested national park rangers as they work through their daily lives in the fictional Brickleberry National Park. Facing the closure of their park, a new ranger joins the force to whip this dysfunctional lot into shape. The series follows the crazy bunch of park rangers as they do their worst to keep the park running.

== Characters ==
=== Main characters ===
- Steve Williams (voiced by David Herman) – Steve is an overconfident, bumbling park ranger who takes himself and his job way too seriously. Even though he has been "Ranger of the Month" at Brickleberry for several years, he does not appear to display good skills or even common sense. Steve's "Ranger of the Month" title means everything to him and he will do anything to keep it. Despite his extreme lack of intelligence, he knows the Brickleberry park very well because his father was also a Brickleberry ranger, so Steve was raised in the park. He dreamed of working at Brickleberry since he was a child in order to follow in his father's footsteps. He is shown to have a man crush on Viggo Mortensen.
- Woodrow "Woody" Wayland Johnson (voiced by Tom Kenny) – Woody is a 55-year-old, abrasive ranger with a military background. In the "Crippleberry" episode, he mentions to Steve that he is technically a war criminal. He worked his way up to head ranger over his 30-year career at Brickleberry. He worked alongside Steve's father, but never searched for him when Jonah went missing. He rarely has the park's best interest in mind when struggling to boost the dwindling tourism numbers. In "2 Weeks Notice", he accidentally confesses to Malloy that when his mother died, his father forced him to dress up in her lingerie, implying that he may have been sexually abused by his father (However, in Season 3, Episode 4 "That Brother's my Father", it is revealed that Woody's mother, who also abused him physically, is very much alive, when she's kicked out of her nursing home and is forced to live with her son. She is briefly married to Denzel) It is also revealed in season 2 that Woody was a former porn star named Rex Erection. He makes a guest appearance along with the Brickleberry cast in Paradise PD, revealed to be an estranged cousin of series regular Chief Randall Crawford and that his obsession with Malloy stemmed from a stuff toy he owned as a child.
- Ethel Anderson (voiced by Kaitlin Olson in season 1, Natasha Leggero in season 2 and 3) – Ethel was the top ranger at Yellowstone and was transferred to Brickleberry in an effort to get the park back on track (and because she was fired from Yellowstone for being drunk on the job). She is attractive and quite passionate for nature, though ironically not for animals themselves. She does her best to treat her co-workers kindly although often fails due to her selfishness and occasional sociopathic behavior. Steve sees Ethel as a threat to his Ranger of the Month title whilst having a crush on her, while Ethel sees Steve as a bumbling idiot. Ethel possesses extraordinary ranger skills but is much more humble than Steve. Ethel is also notorious for her promiscuity.
- Denzel Jackson (voiced by Jerry Minor) – Denzel is a black ranger who is horrible at his job, but can't be fired because he works for a government agency. Denzel is a gerontophile, which occasionally gets him into hot water. Denzel finds his job challenging because he's afraid of bugs, snakes, and pretty much anything else that inhabits the woods. It was revealed in the first season that his father and father's father and grandfather's father were police officers, but his great-grandfather's father was a slave, Denzel has no interest in following in their footsteps.
- Connie Cunaman (voiced by Roger Black) – Connie is a lesbian female ranger who has a large body, immense strength, and a deep voice that is often mistaken for a male. In "Gay Bomb", Connie admits she is a lesbian. She is obsessed with Ethel and was turned away by her Evangelical parents for being a homosexual. When Connie gets excited, her vagina makes growling noises similar to that of a stomach, requiring her to talk it down like a wild animal.
- Malloy (voiced by Daniel Tosh) – Malloy is the last surviving member of his species Ursus loquacious that Woody has taken in and spoiled after Steve accidentally ran over and shot his parents, telling him a tourist did it. Woody lets him play video games all day and eat junk food. Malloy is very crude, tactless, racist, sexist, has a superiority complex, and in some ways is a narcissist. He openly hates the rangers and enjoys putting them down and messing with them on a daily basis, especially Steve. Despite his behavior ironically he is shown to get along with both Steve and Denzel, even going as far as to forgiving Steve for accidentally taking away his parents from him. According to Malloy, if Steve did not do what he did, he would have never been able to enjoy human things and thus, would have never been adopted by humans. He also gets along with Woody as they live together but can be aggressive towards Woody.

=== Recurring characters ===
- Bobby Possumcods (voiced by Waco O'Guin) – Bobby is a redneck who lives in the park. He "loves" animals a bit too much and Malloy got a taste of this first hand in the season one premiere. O'Guin has been portraying the live action version of Possumcods for years in O'Guin and Black's underground comedy called "The DAMN! Show". He reappears briefly in Paradise PD where it's revealed he died after getting high off of leaded gasoline and jumping through a plate glass window.
- BoDean Lynn (voiced by Roger Black) – Bodean is Bobby's sidekick and best friend. He is known to speak very fast and sometimes for a long time.
- Firecracker Jim (voiced by Roger Black) – A local redneck who sells illegal fireworks. He has stumps since he blew off his arms and legs a while ago, and rolls around everywhere as a result.
- Dr. Kuzniak (voiced by Tom Kenny) – Brickleberry's personal doctor. He has a strange fetish of medical malpractice. He also has some shady criminal intents such as medical waste dumping and dealings with the "Chinese Black Market".
- Jorge (voiced by David Herman) – A foreign man who owns the local strip club. He seems to be very clueless and gullible. His origin can be Hispanic or Armenian.

== Production ==
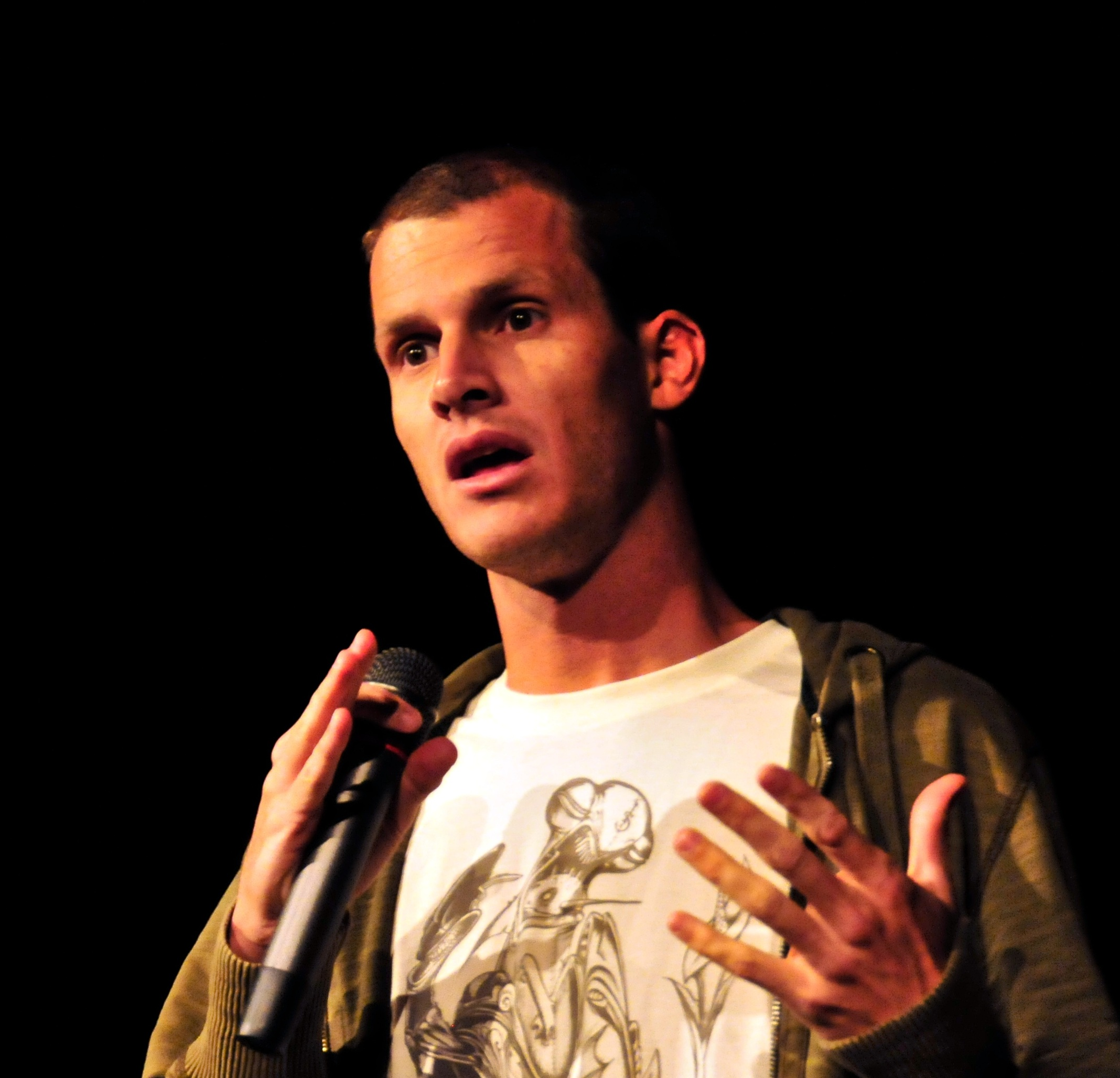
The support of comedian Daniel Tosh was integral in getting the series picked up.

=== Conception ===
The series' creators, Waco O'Guin and Roger Black, met at the University of Georgia in 1999. The series' origin came from O'Guin's father-in-law, a retired park ranger who took his job very seriously. He and Black found his seriousness hilarious, and began first envisioning the show in 2003. The two began pitching Brickleberry as a live-action program after the cancellation of their sketch comedy show Stankervision on MTV2. It was adapted for animation because of budget concerns. Fox Broadcasting Company ordered a pilot episode in 2007, but passed on the series, finding it too offensive. The duo's agent at William Morris Agency connected them with comedian Daniel Tosh, then growing in popularity due to his Comedy Central series Tosh.0. Tosh had been looking for other projects outside his program and put his support behind the show, which they pitched to Comedy Central. The network wanted them to develop another pilot pitch, which they refused, taking it to Adult Swim, who were prepared to order 10 episodes of the comedy. Comedy Central then relented and purchased the show, ordering a 10-episode first season in 2011.

=== Writing ===
In commenting on the series' humor, O'Guin felt that all targets are "fair game": "If you're clever and don't just try to shock for shock sake, you can make most anything funny." Anticipating concerns that the show would be too similar to Family Guy, the show's writing imposed a rule of fewer pop culture references, in order to differentiate the two.

== Episodes ==
Season	Episodes	Originally released		
Season	Episodes	First released	Last released	Network
1	10	September 25, 2012	December 4, 2012	Comedy Central
2	13	September 3, 2013	November 26, 2013	Comedy Central
3	13	September 16, 2014	April 14, 2015	Comedy Central
Special	1	March 6, 2020		Netflix

== Comic ==
In 2016, a 4-issue comic miniseries, published by Dynamite Entertainment, was released, written by co-creators, Waco O'Guin and Roger Black and illustrated by Timothy Hopkins. The comic featured the storyline, "ArMOOgeddon", which takes place in the future, with Steve as the last remaining park ranger after an Alien Cow invasion, but, with the help of Dr. Kuzniak, he travels back in time to 2015 to kill Woody, whose actions led to the invasion and the destruction of all humanity. The Bovine Overlord though sends Bobby back in time to thwart Future Steve's plans, but Malloy teams up with Future Steve to help him kill Woody. When his plan fails, Future Steve returns to the future to rally the remaining park rangers to overthrow the Bovine Overlord.

== Cancellation and crossover ==
On January 7, 2015, Comedy Central cancelled Brickleberry after three seasons. Paradise PD, also created by O'Guin and Black, premiered in 2018 and has been seen as the spiritual successor to Brickleberry due to the similar premise, characters and voice cast. The park rangers of Brickleberry National Park are referenced during the second season, with the second season of Paradise PD featuring "the most unnecessary crossover" between both series, where it is revealed Chief Randall Crawford and Woody are cousins.

== Reception ==
=== Ratings ===
The series followed the Tosh.0 fall seasons on Tuesday nights. In its first season, the series averaged 1.9 total million viewers each week, doing particularly well with male demographics, ages 18–24. In its second season, the show averaged 1.6 million viewers, and was number one in all of television in its time slot with men, ages 18–24. The series' third season saw ratings fall to 1.2 million viewers per episode, while remaining strong with younger demographics.

=== Critical reviews ===
The show garnered mixed reviews from critics.

Ray Rahman of Entertainment Weekly said the show "tends to rise above your average adult-animation fare."

Brickleberry raises the offensive comedy stakes so high that it leaves a viewer waiting in expectation for the next tasteless joke. Because the show can't sustain such jokes constantly, there's a lot of down time between the outrageous. During these valleys, Brickleberry grows dull.

— Rob Owen, Pittsburgh Post-Gazette

Dennis Perkins of The A.V. Club commented that "Brickleberry hails from the 'deliberately provocative' school of comedy, where obviously offensive things are tossed out for shock value and if you don't laugh, you're a tight-ass who doesn't get the other levels to the jokes." Ross Bonaime of Paste gave the show a 0.5 out 10, writing that "Brickleberry is poorly constructed, horribly executed and groan-worthy rather than funny in any way. It's a show that's actually painful to watch, because it keeps finding new depths of tasteless jokes without any punchline that are worse than the ones that preceded them."

Many reviewers compared the show unfavorably to Family Guy and South Park. Brian Lowry of Variety lamented the show's eagerness to offend:

Yes, South Park has long since established animation is a fine place to skewer sacred cows, but Brickleberry has nothing more on its mind than seeing how far it can push the boundaries of dick and handicapped jokes. As a consequence, the premise (a second-rate national park) is purely incidental.

IGN's Jesse Schedeen felt the show did not live up to Comedy Central's past animated efforts, deeming it "a slap to the face of that legacy [... In South Park], there's always an underlying sense of humanity to offset the humor. Brickleberry lacks that." The series creators acknowledged the influence, saying: "Family Guy and South Park paved the way for us."
