= Daniel Tosh =

American comedian and producer (born 1975)

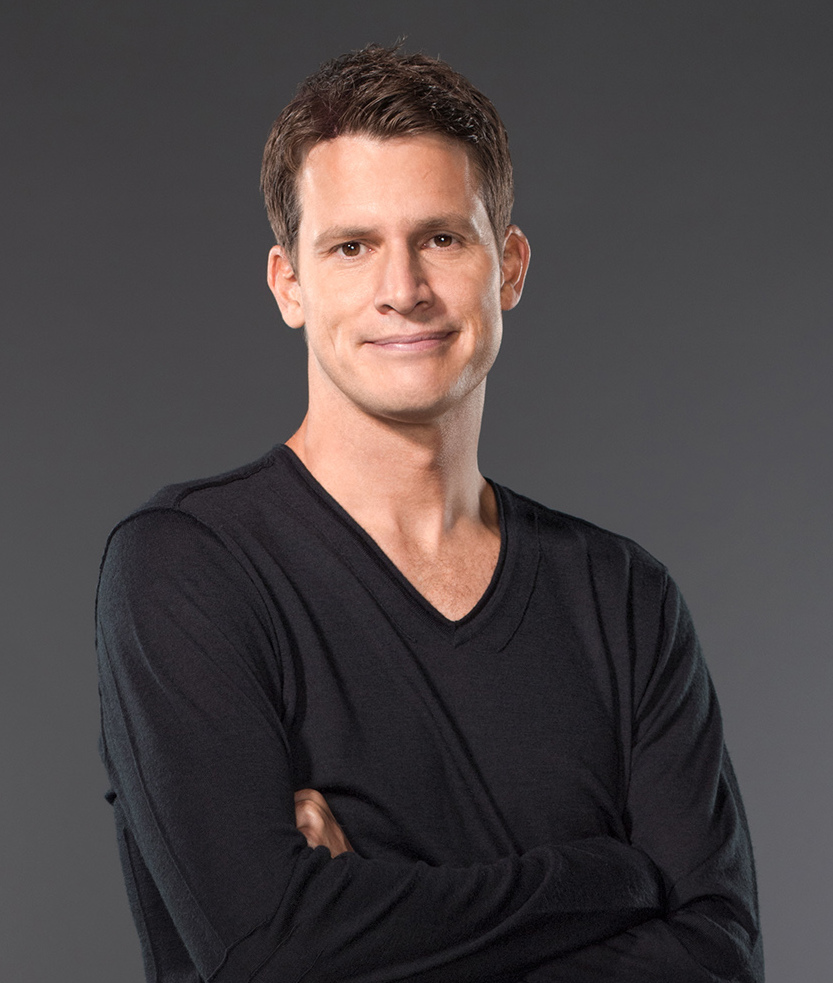
- Tosh in 2013
- Born: Daniel Dwight Tosh; May 29, 1975 (age 51); Boppard, Rhineland-Palatinate, West Germany
- Education: University of Central Florida (BS)
- Notable work: Tosh.0, Brickleberry
- Spouse: Carly Hallam (m. 2016)
- Children: 2

Comedy career
- Years active: 1997–present
- Medium: Stand-up; television
- Genres: Observational comedy; black comedy; insult comedy; cringe comedy; shock humor; sarcasm; satire
- Subjects: Everyday life; human behavior; social awkwardness; sex; gender differences; racism; current events; pop culture
- Website: www.danieltosh.com

Daniel Dwight Tosh (born May 29, 1975) is an American comedian, writer, and producer. After graduating from the University of Central Florida with a degree in marketing, Tosh moved to Los Angeles to pursue a career in comedy. His career accelerated in 2001 after a performance on the Late Show with David Letterman. He went on to appear in other national shows, leading to his own 30-minute special on Comedy Central Presents two years later. From 2009 to 2020, Tosh was the host of Comedy Central series Tosh.0, a showcase of popular Internet video clips with the addition of Tosh's narrative comedic dialogue. Daniel Tosh also went on his own series of comedy tours from 2010 to 2015.

In addition to Tosh.0, he is known for his deliberately offensive and controversial style of black comedy and as the star of stand-up comedy tours and specials.

== Early life ==
Born in Boppard, Rhineland-Palatinate, West Germany, to American parents, Tosh grew up in Titusville, Florida, the son of a Presbyterian minister. After graduating from Astronaut High School in 1993, Tosh attended the University of Central Florida, graduating in December 1996 with a degree in marketing.

Among his first jobs was a telemarketer at Central Florida Research Park. He said later,

Hey, $15 an hour to annoy people! I really was not preparing myself for the future at all. I had interviews lined up. I sat through one real interview and I was like, 'I wouldn't hire me.' I left halfway through the orientation. That's the closest thing I ever got to a real job.

Tosh moved to Los Angeles, but attributes his decision to work in comedy to being raised in Florida, which he considers "flat, hot, and dumb."

== Career ==
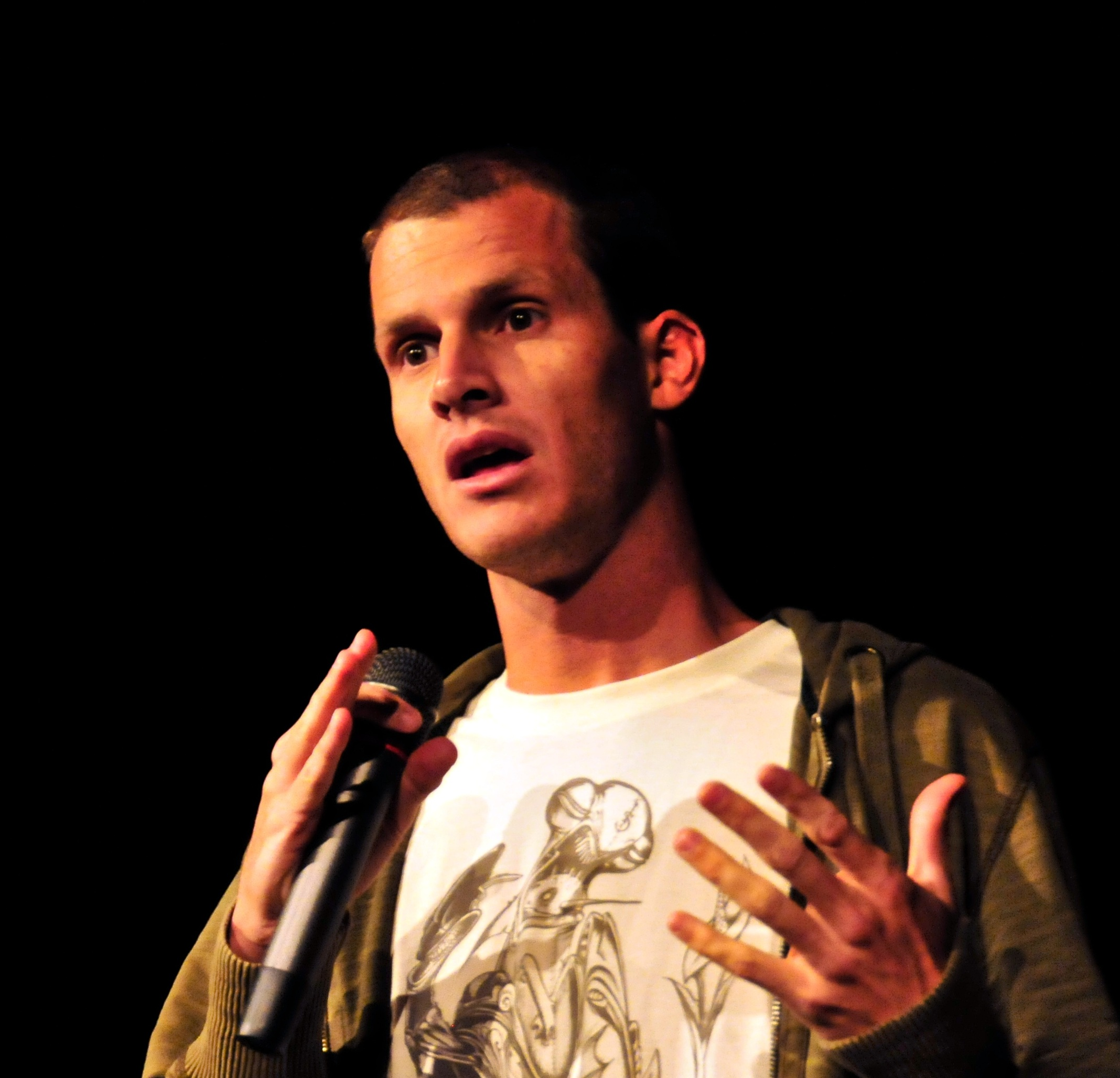
Tosh in 2008 at Boston University

Tosh started touring the comedy club circuit almost immediately after graduating from college. He appeared as one of the "New Faces" at the 1998 Just for Laughs in Montreal. His act was televised in 2000 in Montreal at the Théâtre Saint-Denis.

Tosh's career break came in 2001 with a performance on the Late Show with David Letterman. He made appearances on programs such as The Tonight Show with Jay Leno, Jimmy Kimmel Live!, and Comedy Central's Premium Blend. He hosted a local late-night comedy show in Florida called Tens, and served as a spokesman in Taco Bell commercials.

Tosh has been a regular guest on radio shows such as The Bob & Tom Show, Loveline, and Kevin and Bean. In 2003, he performed in his own 30-minute special on Comedy Central Presents. On June 17, 2007, Comedy Central aired his stand-up special: Daniel Tosh: Completely Serious. He hosted an episode of Comedy Central's Live at Gotham.

Tosh appeared in an episode of MTV's Punk'd as a criminal who broke into Mekhi Phifer's car. He played a fictional version of himself on "Elevator" produced by HBO's Runawaybox and had a small role as Cowboy Hat in the feature film The Love Guru starring Mike Myers. Of his own acting ability, Tosh says, "I'm not a good actor. I can play myself, and a much gayer version of myself. That's about my range."

Tosh said he planned to end his career on his 38th birthday, May 29, 2013, if he had not by that time succeeded as a comedian. He said he would do this by committing suicide or retiring to the beach. He kept a countdown clock on his website that gave the number of days, minutes, and seconds until his 38th birthday which is when "Daniel's Groundhog Day Ends," a reference to the Bill Murray film. Tosh has described a comic's routine life on the road as "Groundhog Day".

His special, Daniel Tosh: Happy Thoughts, premiered on Comedy Central on March 6, 2011, with 3.25 million viewers and a 1.9/5 share. It was later released on DVD.

Tosh was an executive producer of, and the voice of "Malloy" in, the Comedy Central animated sitcom Brickleberry. The show was cancelled after three seasons on January 7, 2015.

In 2012, Tosh was criticized for an interaction with a female audience member during a set at a Hollywood comedy club. After telling a series of jokes about rape, an audience member remarked that "rape jokes are never funny". Tosh responded by saying it would be funny if the audience member herself were raped by "five guys." The exchange prompted a lengthy debate over the appropriateness of jokes about rape.

In 2013, Forbes estimated Tosh's net worth at $11 million, tied for ninth place in its list of all top-earning comedians whose income is primarily from stage ticket sales.

=== Tosh.0 ===
Tosh's Comedy Central television show Tosh.0 premiered on June 5, 2009, based on showcasing Internet video clips. His mocking humor is described as "envelope pushing" and frequently features punchlines that are intentionally self-deprecating, racist, sexist, or homophobic. Tosh's explanation of his non-politically correct humor is "I'm not a misogynistic and racist person...But I do find those jokes funny, so I say them."

=== Tosh Show ===
In November 2023, Tosh started a podcast called Tosh Show on YouTube and Apple Podcasts. He uses a common podcast format, featuring guests in studio, with Eddie, his neighbor from Tahoe who also co-created Tosh.0, behind the camera that chimes in. He announced the podcast on November 7, and the first episode came out on November 14, with new episodes every Tuesday.

== Personal life ==
Tosh has one brother and two sisters. Tosh has stated that he has social anxiety and that he has disfavored public speaking. He married writer Carly Hallam on April 17, 2016 at a private ceremony in Malibu, California. They have two children. In 2018, Tosh lost his home in the Woolsey Fire.

=== Philanthropy ===
Tosh has participated in a show for the family of deceased comedian Greg Giraldo and for Alabama disaster relief.

He has hosted an annual stand-up show called "Tosh Saves The World" which has featured comedians such as Bo Burnham, Chelsea Peretti, Hannibal Buress and Kumail Nanjiani, with the proceeds going to various charities.

== Reception ==
In 2011, Forbes reported that Tosh's 60-date nationwide stand-up tour was sold out. In 2014, he performed sold out shows at an average ticket price at $161.94, according to Forbes.

== Discography ==
- True Stories I Made Up (Compact Disc, 2005)
- Completely Serious (DVD, 2007)
- Happy Thoughts (CD/DVD, March 8, 2011)
- People Pleaser (April 19, 2016)

=== Tours ===
- "Tosh Tour Twenty Ten" (2010)
- "Tosh Tour On Ice" (2011)
- "Tosh Tour Twenty Twelve" (2012)
- "Tosh Tour June Gloom" (2013)
- "The Great Nor'easter Tour" (2015)
- "Florida Trash" (2022)
- "Daniel Tosh Live" (2025)

== Filmography ==
Year	Title	Role	Notes
1998	Sins of the City	DJ Dog Man	Episode: "Rave On"
2003	Comedy Central Presents	Himself	Stand-up Special
2004	Punk'd	Criminal	Episode: "3.6"
2007	Daniel Tosh: Completely Serious	Himself	Stand-up Special
2008	The Love Guru	Cowboy Hat	
2008	Live at Gotham	Himself (host)	Episode: "3.8"
2008	The Life & Times of Tim	Theo (voice)	Episode: "Theo Strikes Back/Amy Gets Wasted"
2009–2020	Tosh.0	Himself (host)	Also co-creator, writer, executive producer
2011	Daniel Tosh: Happy Thoughts	Himself	Stand-up Special
2011	Dave's Old Porn	Himself	Episode: "1.3"
2012–2015	Brickleberry	Malloy (voice)	36 episodes; also executive producer
2016	Daniel Tosh: People Pleaser	Himself	Stand-up Special
2020	Paradise PD	Malloy (voice)	Episode: "Paradise PD Meets Brickleberry"
2024	The GOAT	Host	10 Episodes
