= Paradise PD =

2018 American adult animated comedy streaming television series

- Genre: Adult animation; Animated sitcom; Crime comedy; Satire
- Created by: Waco O'Guin & Roger Black
- Voices of: Sarah Chalke; David Herman; Tom Kenny; Kyle Kinane; Cedric Yarbrough; Dana Snyder
- Composers: Nicolas Barry; Tomas Jacobi; Rene Garza Aldape; Alejandro Valencia
- Country of origin: United States
- Original language: English
- No. of seasons: 4
- No. of episodes: 40

Production
- Executive producers: Waco O'Guin; Roger Black; Scott Greenberg; Joel Kuwahara; Marc Provissiero
- Producers: Rocky Russo; Jeremy Sosenko; Amy Pocha; Seth Cohen; Josh Lehrman; Kyle Stegina
- Editor: Jeff Cannell
- Running time: 23–30 minutes
- Production companies: Damn! Show Productions; Bento Box Entertainment; Odenkirk Provissiero Entertainment

Original release
- Network: Netflix
- Release: August 31, 2018 – December 16, 2022

Related
- Brickleberry; Farzar

Paradise PD is an American adult animated sitcom created by Waco O'Guin and Roger Black that premiered on August 31, 2018, and ran for four seasons on Netflix. The series stars Dana Snyder, Cedric Yarbrough, David Herman, Tom Kenny, Sarah Chalke, and Kyle Kinane. The second season was released on March 6, 2020, and the third season was released on March 12, 2021. Netflix renewed the series for the fourth and final season, titled Paradise PD: Party Dudes, which premiered on December 16, 2022.

== Premise ==
Paradise PD follows Kevin Crawford joining the small-town police department in the crime-ridden town of Paradise with his mother Karen as the mayor, his estranged father Chief Randall Crawford initially against his son joining the force as he blamed him for his numerous shortcomings since Kevin accidentally shot his testicles.

The other police officers themselves are presented as equally incompetent and morally corrupt, consisting of the violent Gina Jabowski, the PTSD-afflicted Gerald "Fitz" Fitzgerald, morbidly obese Dusty Marlow, senior citizen Stanley Hopson, and the drug-addicted drug dog Bullet. The town is also home to many regulars that include the hillbillies Robby and Delbert, Hobo Cop, Dr. Funtlicher, Preacher Paul, Frank Flipperfist and his son Jerry.

The overarching storyline of the first two seasons focuses on Kevin trying to earn his father's love by cracking down on a crime boss known only as "The Kingpin", eventually revealed to be an alternate personality of Fitz's whose master scheme is turning Paradise into a giant deep-dish pizza. The third season covers a series of events that include Kevin entering into a relationship with Gina despite her fat man fetish and violent streak, Randall and Karen rekindling their relationship with the latter pregnant, and Fitz and Bullet in a relationship with a dolphin before raising the latter's biological dog/dolphin hybrid son together. But Gina runs off on her wedding day with the police force fired after another disaster strikes Paradise. The fourth and final season depicts the former officers ending up in a series of events from Kevin's newborn baby brother trying to have him killed to an eccentric CEO named Charles Lovely moving to Paradise with sinister plans in mind.

== Cast and characters ==
=== Main ===
- Sarah Chalke (main; seasons 1–3) and Donna Jay Fulks (recurring; season 4) as Gina Jabowski, a psychotic and violent police officer who is the most feared enforcer in the town of Paradise. As a fat fetishist, she is obsessed with and often sexually harasses her obese coworker Dusty Marlow, much to his mild disdain. When she was a little girl, her father made her a human shield to block a bullet shot from Randall and got hit in the back of her head. She survived the shot with the bullet still inside her skull, which was revealed to be the cause of her being a hot-tempered violent psychopath and an obese-loving harasser. Over the course of the series, she and Kevin slowly fall in love leading her to surgically remove the bullet in her brain so she can be faithful to him. During their wedding, Isis attacks and takes everyone hostage, forcing Kevin to shoot her in the head to return her to her angry persona, much to their shared sadness. Following the season three finale, Gina ends up working with the Strawberry Action Squad to infiltrate Lovely Corp. She is the PD counterpart of Brickleberry main cast member Ethel Anderson.
- David Herman as Kevin Crawford, a newly hired police officer and the son of Chief Randall Crawford and Mayor Karen Crawford. Initially as dim witted and incompetent as the others, as the series progresses, it is shown he is actually a capable and competent officer, though he could be better if he had the proper equipment and funding for his work. Kevin has faced constant abuse from his parents after he accidentally shot his father's testicles thirteen years prior to the beginning of the series. In seasons two and three, Kevin developed a crush on Gina when she began to soften towards him. While these feelings were initially unrequited, they eventually entered into a relationship, and became engaged near the end of season three. He is left heartbroken when she leaves him in remorse for nearly killing him on their wedding day after reverting into her violent persona following an Isis attack. Following the birth of his baby brother, he is renamed "AFKAK" (An acronym for "Asshole Formerly Known as Kevin") before eventually asserting himself to finally be respected. He is the PD counterpart of Brickleberry main cast member Steve Williams.
- Tom Kenny as Chief Randall Crawford, the police chief of Paradise PD and Kevin's father. Once a fine and proud cop, following an incident where his son shot off both of his testicles, he became incredibly bitter, which eventually led to his divorce with his wife. He has frequently been seen to use testosterone patches in order to maintain his hormone levels. Throughout season one he reignites his relationship with Mayor Karen, and they get remarried in season two. He is the PD counterpart of Brickleberry main cast member Woody Johnson, the two revealed to be estranged cousins.
- Kyle Kinane as Bullet, an anthropomorphic German Shepherd who is addicted to the confiscated drugs that he is tasked with guarding. He is the PD counterpart of Brickleberry main cast member Malloy.
- Cedric Yarbrough as Gerald "Fitz" Fitzgerald, a police officer whose PTSD sometimes hinders his police work. He has been shown to cope through therapeutic piccolo playing. He often struggles to have his troubles understood by the other officers, leading to discourse within the team, especially in the second season. In the season one finale, it revealed that Fitz was the mysterious Kingpin but in the season two finale, Fitz's kingpin persona is actually a split personality that is based from the original Kingpin, who was an overweight criminal that has an obsession with Deep Dish Pizza and took over Fitz's body to continue his crime empire. In the season two finale, Fitz defeats the Kingpin persona in his mind and takes control of his body again. He is the PD counterpart of Brickleberry main cast member Denzel Jackson.
- Dana Snyder as Dusty Marlow (seasons 2–4; recurring season 1), an obese police officer who is constantly sexually harassed by Gina. He is very childlike and owns several cats. He has been shown to hold a grudge with everyone who laughs at him when he ripped his pants every time he bends over and yells at employees of fast food restaurants for giving him meals that are impossible to be ordered. In season three, he acts as a manipulative bully who harasses food store owners in Restaurant Road and blackmails his coworkers to get whatever he wants. It is possible that these changes in his personality would be the result of his time at the female prison in the season one finale and season two premiere. He is the PD counterpart of Brickleberry main cast member Connie Cunaman.
  - Snyder also voices Stanley Hopson (seasons 2–4; recurring season 1), an elderly bisexual police officer who often gets out-of-the-ordinary assignments from Chief Crawford. Even at his advanced age, Hopson is a sexually active deviant, who often recounts his sexual endeavors with other men. He is also senile, which leads to many comical misunderstandings. In the pilot episode, Randall reveals that they cannot retire Stanley because the city lacks the funds to pay his pension. He is the only main cast member to not have a Brickleberry counterpart, implying that he is naturally a Paradise PD character (or a standalone), while the other 6 are cop versions of the Brickleberry main cast (rangers).
  - Snyder also voices Baby Kevin Crawford, who was previously voiced by Rocky Russo in season 3. First appearing in the third season as a fetus that was originally a 15-year old sperm cell, he attempted to kill Randall out of revenge as his surviving sperm cell before being informed that Kevin is the guilty party. The baby is later born at the beginning of the final season, named "Kevin" by his parents as their way of starting fresh as parents and revealed to be immortal. Baby Kevin spends most of the final season trying to force Kevin to kill himself, only to make peace with his brother after his time travel adventure. Like Bullet, he is the PD counterpart of Brickleberry main cast member Malloy.

=== Recurring ===
- Grey Griffin as Mayor Karen Crawford, the mayor of Paradise, Kevin's mother, and Randall's ex-wife.
- Waco O'Guin as Robby, a blonde redneck who sells argyle meth. Bears a striking resemblance to Brickleberry character, Bobby Possumcods. The Season 2 announcement video revealed that Bobby and Robby are related cousins.
- Roger Black as Delbert, Robby's adoptive brother, best friend and sidekick who also sells argyle meth. Also bears a striking resemblance to a Brickleberry character. In this case, it's BoDean (Bobby Possumcods' dim-witted friend). In the season one episode Task Force, Delbert gets attacked by the Kingpin's goons due to a decline in argyle meth sales and loses his right arm in the process; by the end of the first season, he gains a robotic prosthetic. In the season two episode Who Ate Wally's Waffles, it is revealed that Delbert's birth name was Wally and he was artificially created by imagineers at The Walt Disney Company to be their next Disney star; he is stolen by Robby's family as a kid, renamed Delbert, and de facto adopted by Robby's family after Robby wanted Wally for his birthday.
- Dana Snyder as Thester Carbomb IV, Fitz's assistant and therapist, first appearing in the season two episode Paradise Found. In season 3 episode Showdown at the O-bese Corral, he became overweight from eating his feelings when he was depressed for looking like Patton Oswalt. He returns in the final season as an assistant to Charles Lovely.
- John DiMaggio as Mrs. Whiskers, a crazy alley cat. She makes a cameo appearance in the limited series Farzar.

== Episodes ==
Season	Episodes	Originally released
1	10	August 31, 2018
2	8	March 6, 2020
3	12	March 12, 2021
4	10	December 16, 2022

=== Season 1 (2018) ===
No. overall	No. in season	Title	Directed by	Written by	Original release date
Part 1
1	1	"Welcome to Paradise"	Matt Garofalo	Roger Black & Waco O'Guin	August 31, 2018
Kevin Crawford has always wanted to be a cop, just like his father...until the day Kevin accidentally castrated his father by shooting him in the testicles. Years later, Kevin still wants to be a cop, despite his father's objections, and Kevin gets the chance when a drug called "argyle meth" begins hitting the streets of Paradise. Meanwhile, Bullet (the Paradise police department's drug-addled drug-sniffing dog) feels guilty when all of his canine friends die from an argyle meth overdose.
2	2	"Ass on the Line"	Brian Mainolfi	Roger Black & Waco O'Guin	August 31, 2018
Continuing where "Welcome to Paradise" left off, the Paradise PD are still looking for the argyle meth kingpin after Terry Two-Toes (from the previous episode) is found dead in his jail cell from a mysterious gunshot, so Kevin and Bullet (the latter of which is looking for a thrill to stave off his boredom with going clean and sober) infiltrate the world of underground dogfighting. Meanwhile, Randall is haunted by memories of a cold case while investigating a death involving a corpse's naked butt.
3	3	"Black & Blue"	Lauren Andrews	Aaron Lee	August 31, 2018
Officer Fitzgerald's PTSD worsens when his accidental shooting of himself makes the news on the liberal side as yet another story of a police officer exercising race-based police brutality by shooting an unarmed black man and on the conservative side as a young, black man fighting back against a racist cop. Meanwhile, Hopson is sent to a retirement home (which he thinks is an undercover operation) and discovers a disturbing secret.
4	4	"Karla"	Fill Marc Sagadraca	Rocky Russo & Jeremy Sosenko	August 31, 2018
Kevin's mom (the mayor of Paradise) gets her son a new police car, and things get complicated when the car's computer system falls for Kevin. Meanwhile, Dusty's fried chicken recipe gets everyone in town hooked (mostly because Dusty used powdered heroin as flour).
5	5	"Dungeons & Dragnet"	Matt Garofalo	Roger Black & Waco O'Guin	August 31, 2018
The popular role-playing game Dungeons & Dragons gets banned from Paradise over concerns that it may be Satanic. Meanwhile, Bullet makes time with a pastor's daughter, who won't have sex with him unless the Bible explicitly tells her so.
6	6	"Meet the Jabowskis"	Brian Mainolfi	Amy Pocha & Seth Cohen	August 31, 2018
Gina goes to the doctor to find the source of her overly violent behavior and why she doesn't remember anything before the age of 21, and discovers that it's from a gunshot wound allegedly caused by an African warlord named Bumfuqué. But when Bumfuqué points out that Gina's answer lies in the town of Bumfuque, Gina is reunited with her long-lost family, who prove to be just as violent and hardcore as she is. Meanwhile, the Paradise police department is in a shambles from Gina's absence, Dusty's cheerful songs to drug addicts leads to the drug addicts taking over the precinct, and Officer Fitzgerald and Bullet find a suitcase filled with money that neither of them want to share between the other.
7	7	"Police Academy"	Lauren Andrews	Aaron Lee	August 31, 2018
Kevin and his father are ordered by the Mayor to attend the Police academy, the officers fool Hopson into thinking that he is dead, and Bullet cleans up the town by arresting all the prostitutes.
8	8	"Task Force"	Fill Marc Sagadraca	Rocky Russo & Jeremy Sosenko	August 31, 2018
Kevin and his team of misfits decide to crack down on the Argyle meth trade, Dusty accidentally auctiones off his virginity on the Dark web, and the Chief readies the station for an important interview.
9	9	"Parent Trap"	Matt Garofalo	Michael Rowe	August 31, 2018
Dusty, believing that he is Native American, decides to protest against the Thanksgiving parade. Hopson and Bullet go into the forest in search of a live turkey, and Kevin manages to join his parents together again. His plan accidentally backfires as he is forced to move out and live in the sewers with the flipper-people.
10	10	"Christmas in Paradise"	Brian Mainolfi	Roger Black & Waco O'Guin	August 31, 2018
It's Christmas, and Fitz is still in a coma. Dusty wants a train set for Christmas and tries to get everyone in the Holiday spirit on order for Santa to bring it to him. Kevin gets a lead on the meth case.

=== Season 2 (2020) ===
No. overall	No. in season	Title	Directed by	Written by	Original release date
Part 2
11	1	"Paradise Found"	Brian Mainolfi	Waco O'Guin & Roger Black	March 6, 2020
Gina is determined to bust Dusty out of jail after being falsely arrested by Kevin for being the Kingpin in the previous episode. The Crawfords are planning to remarry, and Fitz has made millions by making Dippin' Dots after the town has become safe for tourists again.
12	2	"Big Ball Energy"	Lauren Andrews	Roger Black & Waco O' Guin	March 6, 2020
After freeing Dusty, crime levels in Paradise escalate. As a result Kevin becomes the most hated person in town and has a holiday named after him. Fitz and his crime-associates decide to go after a new supplier of Houndstood meth, and Bullet is forced to feed Dusty's last surviving cat.
13	3	"Tucker Carlson Is a Huge D**k"	Matt Garofalo	Dan Signer	March 6, 2020
After a rant by Fox News presenter Tucker Carlson, the gender politics within the police goes haywire. The male and female officers create their own taskforce. Meanwhile, Fitz and his associate is kidnapped by Gal-Qaida
14	4	"Who Ate Wally's Waffles?"	Brian Mainolfi	Steve Tompkins	March 6, 2020
Dusty gets irritated over an inconclusive cliffhanger to an old Disney sitcom. He decides to take the abducted child-star Delbert to the Disney Channel to finish the series. Meanwhile, Kevin has problems going to the toilet at work.
15	5	"The Father, the Son and the Post-it Note"	Lauren Andrews	Rocky Russo & Jeremy Sosenko	March 6, 2020
The FBI-agent Clappers moves into town to solve the King Pin-case. Chief Crawford grows jealous of his talent, and testicles. Meanwhile, Fitz and his "Legion of Dooooom" lose their money to the Catholic Church.
16	6	"Flip the Vote"	Matt Garofalo	Roger Black & Waco O' Guin	March 6, 2020
Mayor Karen legalizes meth in order to win the local election. This inspires Fitz to run against her. The chief is under crackhouse-arrest, and Bullet takes a short visit to hell after eating at MethDonalds.
17	7	"Paradise PD Meets Brickleberry"	Brian Mainolfi	Waco O' Guin & Roger Black	March 6, 2020
After fleeing Paradise, the officers head for Brickleberry National Park. They help Ranger Woody finding his missing bear Malloy while making friendships with the other rangers.
18	8	"Operation DD"	Lauren Andrews	Roger Black & Waco O' Guin	March 6, 2020
After learning that officer Fitz is mentally troubled by a past incident, the squad races back to Paradise to stop the town from being obliterated by nuclear weapons.

=== Season 3 (2021) ===
No. overall	No. in season	Title	Directed by	Written by	Original release date
Part 3
19	1	"Fallout"	Ashley J. Long; Mike Disa	Waco O'Guin & Roger Black	March 12, 2021
Three months after the deep-dish pizza nuclear explosion, Fitz finds out he married a dolphin, Robbie and Delbert conquer an island formed by the nuclear fallout, and Randall develops an anal polyp that begins to take over his life and body.
20	2	"Top Cops"	Brian Mainolfi	Roger Black & Waco O' Guin	March 12, 2021
Paradise PD engineers arrests to win Top Cop. Meanwhile, Dusty extorts free doughnuts from the local doughnut shop, Kevin converts to Judaism, and Fitz takes on multiple new identities.
21	3	"Ice Ice Babies"	Lauren Andrews	Rocky Russo & Jeremy Sosenko	March 12, 2021
Randall must prove to Karen that he's a good father by taking care of Hopson. Meanwhile, Delbert and Rusty open a carnival on the new island they conquered, Dusty goes to great lengths to attend the carnival, despite being confined to desk duty, and Bullet poses as a stuffed animal to get close to a sexy woman.
22	4	"Trigger Warning"	Mike Disa	Josh Lehrman & Kyle Stegina	March 12, 2021
Paradise's gun problem spirals out of control...and things get worse when smartguns are introduced. Meanwhile, Bullet becomes a viral video star and Fitz tries to rekindle his marriage.
23	5	"Showdown at the O-bese Corral"	Brian Mainolfi	Dan Signer	March 12, 2021
Dusty becomes the leader of a fat acceptance cult. Meanwhile, Gina confronts her masturbation addiction, Fitz's dolphin wife gets a job at SeaWorld, and Chief is forced to accept his biggest insecurity
24	6	"How the Cookie Crumbles"	Lauren Andrews	Seth Cohen & Amy Pocha	March 12, 2021
Randall stages a heist to steal his sperm back from the sperm bank. Meanwhile, Fitz runs afoul of the mutants who remember him as "The Kingpin", and Dusty recreates Family Feud.
25	7	"Blind Drunk"	Mike Disa	Rocky Russo & Jeremy Sosenko	March 12, 2021
To keep Karen from drinking alcohol when she's pregnant again, Randall outlaws all alcoholic beverages leaving Bullet, Robby and Delbert to become Dukes Of Hazzard. Kevin lies to Gina of having a girlfriend in Canada.
26	8	"Blimp City"	Jackson Turcotte; Beth Wollman	Amy Pocha & Seth Cohen	March 12, 2021
27	9	"The World According to LARP"	Brian Mainolfi	Rocky Russo & Jeremy Sosenko	March 12, 2021
28	10	"Fetal Attraction"	Mike Disa	Nora Nolan	March 12, 2021
29	11	"What Happens in Twatemala"	Peter Merryman	Josh GreenbArg	March 12, 2021
30	12	"PARAD-ISIS"	Brian Mainolfi	Roger Black & Waco O'Guin	March 12, 2021
Gina is finally able to be attracted to Kevin after having the bullet in her brain removed, although the two agree not to have sex until they marry, which they plan on doing rather soon to counteract this. Bullet is worried Fritz will find out that he is the true father of Fritz's child, and attempts to hide that information through not being around Fritz as much as possible, only for this to be impossible after the two are put in charge of creating Kevin's Bachelor Party. Dusty ends up joining ISIS by accident, leading to Crawford attempting a sting organization against the infamous terrorist organization.

=== Season 4: Party Dudes (2022) ===
No. overall	No. in season	Title	Directed by	Written by	Original release date
Part 4
31	1	"The Brozone Lair"	John Martinez	Roger Black & Waco O'Guin	December 16, 2022
32	2	"Diddy's Home"	Beth Wollman	Waco O'Guin & Roger Black	December 16, 2022
33	3	"A Star Is Porn"	Brian Mainolfi	Roger Black & Waco O'Guin	December 16, 2022
After Kevin expresses interest in a kid's band that Crawford used to be a part of, the Chief decides to create his own music group with those in Paradise P.D., only for all of the songs to accidentally contain highly pedophilic implications, much to the dismay of Fritz. Meanwhile, AFKAK becomes a porn star because of his strange penis, eventually resulting in him winning an award for his performances and an attractive woman wishing to sleep with him, only for his penis to be stung by a bee before such a thing can happen.
34	4	"Good Jeans"	Beth Wollman	Waco O'Guin & Roger Black	December 16, 2022
35	5	"The Shartist"	John Martinez	Roger Black & Waco O'Guin	December 16, 2022
36	6	"The Butt Cut"	Brian Mainolfi	Waco O'Guin & Roger Black	December 16, 2022
37	7	"Boat!"	Beth Wollman	Roger Black & Waco O'Guin	December 16, 2022
38	8	"King of the Norf"	John Martinez	Rocky Russo & Jeremy Sosenko	December 16, 2022
39	9	"Sack to the Future"	Brian Mainolfi	Kyle Stegina & Josh Lehrman	December 16, 2022
40	10	"The Eternal Reckoning"	Beth Wollman	Waco O'Guin & Roger Black	December 16, 2022

== Production ==
=== Development ===
On April 4, 2018, Netflix announced that they had given the production a straight-to-series order for a first season consisting of ten episodes. The series was created by Waco O'Guin and Roger Black. Production company and animation studio Bento Box Entertainment was expected to produce the series alongside Odenkirk Provissiero Entertainment. On October 30, 2018, it was announced that Netflix had renewed the series for a second season. The third season was announced in April 2020 and was released on March 12, 2021. The second season features a crossover episode with Brickleberry while making references throughout the latter half of the first season such as Fitz, the only black police officer on Paradise PD, being called Denzel, the only black park ranger on Brickleberry by Kevin, Steve's doppelgänger. Netflix renewed the show for a fourth and final season which premiered on December 16, 2022.

=== Casting ===
Alongside the initial series announcement, it was reported that Dana Snyder, Cedric Yarbrough, David Herman, Tom Kenny who also voiced in Waco O'Guin & Roger Black's previous animated show Brickleberry, Sarah Chalke, and Kyle Kinane had been cast in series regular roles.

== Release ==
On July 25, 2018, the first trailer for the series was released alongside the announcement that it would premiere on August 31, 2018.

== Graphic novel ==
On March 3, 2026, Kickstarter launched a fundraiser for a graphic novel of the Paradise PD/Farzar crossover and reached its goal of $20K in seven hours after the launch. The Graphic Novel will pick off right after the finale's cliffhanger.

== Reception ==
On Rotten Tomatoes, the first season holds an approval rating of 40%, with an average rating of 5/10 and based on 5 reviews. In a negative review, The Daily Dot's Audra Schroeder gave the series a rating of two-and-a-half stars out of five and criticized the series, describing it as "blunt-force humor without much emotional attachment." In a similarly unfavorable critique, Decider's Joel Keller recommended that viewers skip the series: "If it were just a little bit funnier, we'd recommend it. But it's just not worth sitting through the many unfunny, dirty gags to get to the good stuff." In a more favorable assessment, Konbini's Florian Ques praised the series: "The most thrilling aspect of Paradise PD is its natural ability to slip in some real burns aimed at pop culture figures. ... The humor used to criticize them is very well-executed."
