= Waco O'Guin =

American actor

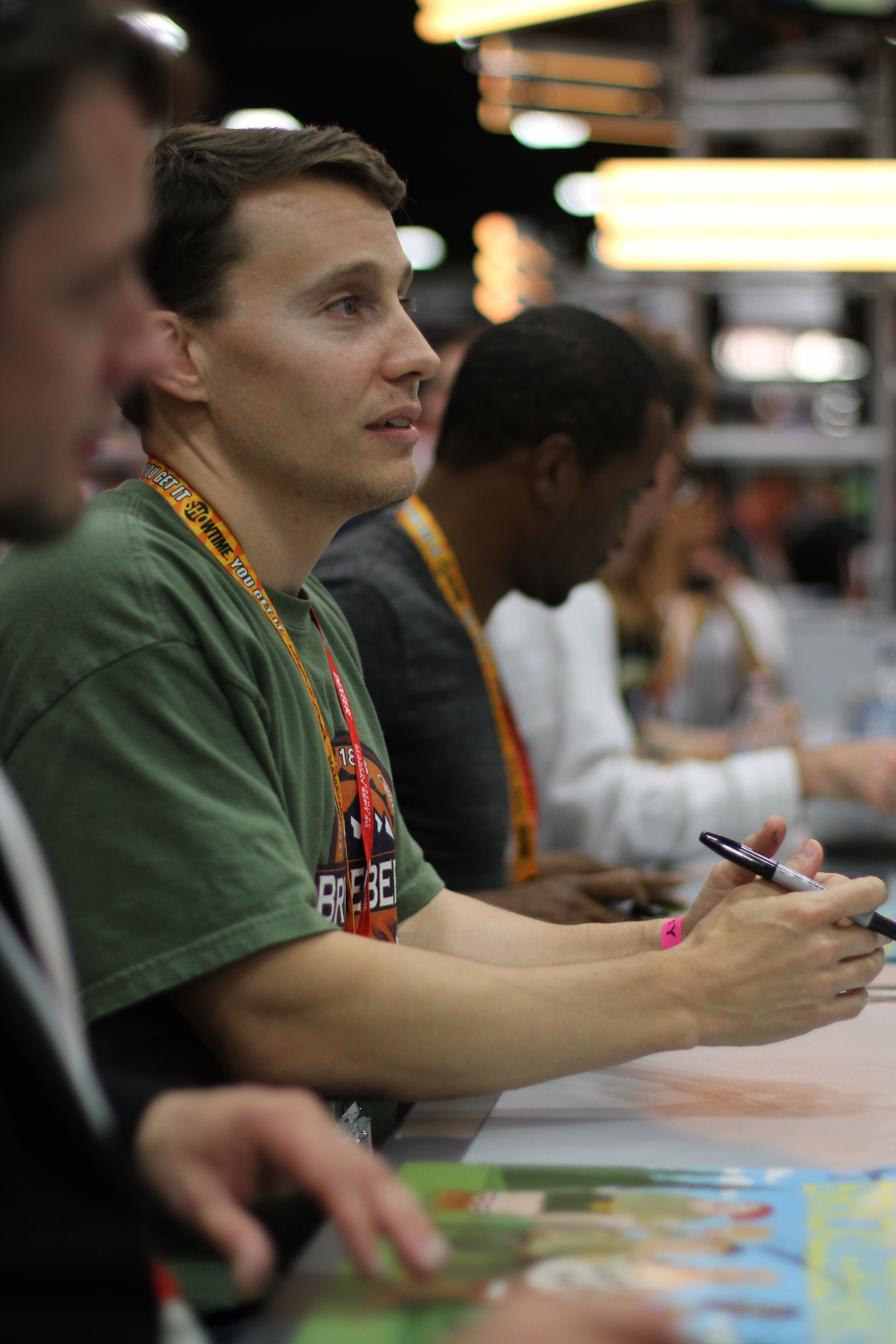
- O'Guin at the 2012 San Diego Comic-Con
- Born: Jayme Waco O'Guin; June 24, 1975 (age 51); Lakeland, Georgia, U.S.
- Occupations: Comedian, Actor, Animator, Writer, and Producer

Jayme Waco O'Guin (born June 24, 1975) is an American comedian, actor, voice actor, animator, writer, and producer. He is the co-creator, executive producer, and a cast member of the Comedy Central animated series Brickleberry along with fellow writer Roger Black. O'Guin and Black were inspired to create Brickleberry by O'Guin's father-in-law, a former park ranger named Woody. The two later created the 2018 series Paradise PD and the 2022 sci-fi series Farzar for the American streaming service Netflix.

O'Guin also co-created and starred in MTV2's clown based prank show Stankervision, the underground sketch comedy series The DAMN! Show and a series on Turner's now defunct comedy site, Super Deluxe.

O'Guin is originally from the small town of Lakeland, Georgia and won a national Homer Simpson drawing contest as a youth.

== Voice-over filmography ==
List of performances
Year	Title	Role	Notes	Ref(s)
2012	Brickleberry	Bobby Possumcods	series co-creator	
2018	Paradise PD	Robby	series co-creator	
2022	Farzar	Flobby	series co-creator	
