= List of The Cuphead Show! episodes =

Episode list for an animated series

The Cuphead Show! is an animated television series developed by Dave Wasson for Netflix, based on the 2017 video game Cuphead by Studio MDHR. Chad and Jared Moldenhauer, the creators of Cuphead, serve as executive producers, along with Wasson and CJ Kettler from King Features Syndicate, and Cosmo Segurson serving as co-executive producer.

During the course of the series, 36 episodes of The Cuphead Show! were released over three seasons, between February 18, 2022, and November 18, 2022. A fourth season included only one episode, "Traveling Time Machine to 2050", which was broadcast on April 29,2024.

== Series overview ==
Season	Episodes	Originally released
1	12	February 18, 2022
2	13	August 19, 2022
3	11	November 18, 2022

== Episodes ==
Every episode was written by Deeki Deke, Clay Morrow, Adam Paloian, Cosmo Segurson, and Dave Wasson.

=== Season 1 (2022) ===
No. overall	No. in season	Title	Directed by	Storyboard by	Original release date	Prod. code
1	1	"Carn-Evil"	Adam Paloian	Adam Paloian	February 18, 2022	101A
Cuphead and Mugman drop their chores to visit CarnEvil, where Cuphead becomes attached to Soul Ball, a skee-ball game. As Cuphead goes on a winning streak, Mugman realizes that the carnival is really a front for stealing souls. In Inkwell Hell, the Devil realizes that Cuphead's winning streak has stopped the soul harvest. He and his assistant, Henchman appear at CarnEvil to attempt to restore the soul harvest. While trying to warn Cuphead about the Devil, Mugman accidentally causes him to lose the game, but he manages to put his soul back into his body. The Devil chases them throughout CarnEvil and, the brothers eventually trick him into destroying all of CarnEvil, freeing all the souls. Cuphead and Mugman escape as the Devil swears to claim the former's soul.
2	2	"Baby Bottle"	Clay Morrow	Casey Alexander & Dan Becker	February 18, 2022	101B
While Elder Kettle leaves the cottage to get his mustache waxed, Cuphead and Mugman find a living baby bottle on their doorstep along with a note to take care of him. Mugman takes to being a "mama" while Cuphead finds Baby Bottle unsettling and destructive. After Baby Bottle locks the boys outside and tampers with Elder Kettle's radio, Mugman calls the bottle a "Bad Baby". This causes Baby Bottle to go through a rage of destruction, including destroying Mugman's childhood teddy bear and the radio. Finally, Elder Kettle returns to find the destroyed house and suffers Baby Bottle's wrath after he rips his mustache and beats him up. He and the boys ready themselves to confront Baby Bottle, only to find that he has settled down. The three quickly drop him off at another house.
3	3	"Ribby & Croaks"	Adam Paloian	Benjamin Arcand & Ian Vazquez	February 18, 2022	103B
Cuphead and Mugman bicker over who "sleep-ate" the other's ice cream. Elder Kettle gives them five dollars to spend on more ice cream. Instead, the brothers discover a ferry boat club called the Fly Trap, run by the argumentative frog brothers Ribby and Croaks. Seeing that the club has free ice cream, the boys try to get in but are unable to pay the entry fee, which is 20 dollars. The boys sneak into the club through the vents, and are about to take the ice cream as Elder Kettle insisted, but Ribby and Croaks find the boys and chase after them. During the chase, the ferry begins to flood, and Cuphead and Mugman apologize for eating each other's ice cream. Touched, Ribby and Croaks settle their feud as well, although their club is destroyed because of the chaos.
4	4	"Handle with Care"	Clay Morrow	Dan Becker & Kennedy Tarell	February 18, 2022	102A
Mugman's handle breaks off during a blindfolded pillow fight. Cuphead tries to fix it in improbable ways before remembering to use glue. As they have run out, they are forced to head to Porkrind's to buy more while trying to hide Mugman's broken handle, as it disgusts Elder Kettle, who screams upon seeing his broken handle. At his shop, Cuphead gives different handles to Mugman before Porkrind declares that he ran out of glue and will not get another shipment for three months. Mugman sulks, but Elder Kettle claims that he simply lost his "baby handle" and that the Handle Fairy will give him a "man-handle" to replace it. Cuphead breaks his handle as well, and he and Mugman place their handles under their respective pillows. In the morning, the boys are excited to have received new handles, unaware that Elder Kettle merely glued them back on, as he had kept all the glue the whole time.
5	5	"Roll the Dice"	Adam Paloian	Benjamin Arcand & Ian Vazquez	February 18, 2022	104A
Elder Kettle prepares to listen to his favorite game show, Roll the Dice, hosted by King Dice, who uses the show as a front to steal souls for the Devil. Cuphead and Mugman chase Elder Kettle's lucky tire into the city while playing with it, ending up on the set of the show, where Cuphead is unexpectedly selected as a contestant. Upon realizing who Cuphead is while Cuphead introduces himself on stage, King Dice calls the Devil, promising to get Cuphead's soul. Cuphead fails the first game, "Name that Tune", forcing King Dice to make the challenges easier for him. Cuphead destroys the dice in his final task and accepts that he has lost. When King Dice still insists that he has won, the audience accuses him of rigging the game, making Cuphead and Mugman head home. Enraged for his failure, the Devil fires King Dice and replaces him with Henchman in the game show.
6	6	"Ghosts Ain't Real!"	Adam Paloian	Benjamin Arcand & Ian Vazquez	February 18, 2022	106A
After watching a zombie horror movie, Cuphead and Mugman decide to take a shortcut through a cemetery back home. A bored trio of scary ghosts spot the boys and decide to have fun with them, trapping them in the cemetery. Cuphead resolves to spend the night there and tries to calm Mugman by telling him that "ghosts ain't real", only for the ghosts to reveal themselves and chase the boys throughout the cemetery. Eventually, the brothers fall out of the window seemingly to their deaths. The ghosts are horrified and very sad at the thought of Cuphead and Mugman's death, but the brothers escape while not noticing they recover and quickly escape back home.
7	7	"Root Packed"	Clay Morrow	Karl Hadrika, Zoë Moss & Dave Thomas	February 18, 2022	104B
While gardening, Elder Kettle hurts his back. As he is resting, Cuphead decides to use the opportunity to go to the movies, but Mugman convinces him to watch the vegetable garden instead. The Root Pack, a trio of freeloading vegetables, raids Elder Kettle's gardening supplies. The brothers discover them as the trio introduces themselves and lies about being orphans Cuphead and Mugman are convinced that they can watch the garden while they go to the movies. Upon returning home, the brothers are shocked that the Root Pack is hosting a party for other vegetables, draining Elder Kettle's garden. The brothers try multiple attempts to kick them out but they are unsuccessful and decide to give up. Realizing that one of the Root Pack is prone to crying, the brothers play on his sensitivity to make him cry, resulting in him peeling and driving the sobbing partygoers off and watering Elder Kettle's garden with the tears. After the party clears out, The Root Pack are told by the brothers to leave, but as revenge, they completely drain Elder Kettle's garden for one last sip on the road, making them gigantically overstuffed, much to Cuphead and Mugman's horror. Elder Kettle returns and mistakes the Root Pack for his vegetables, much to the trio's delight but then horror, as he prepares to make them into a stew.
8	8	"Sweater Off Dead" (Part 1)	Adam Paloian	Megan Boyd & Fernando Puig	February 18, 2022	105A
Cuphead is having nightmares about the Devil claiming his soul, so Mugman decides to take him to see the sage Quadratus for advice on how to deter the Devil. Quadratus has Mugman knit a magical invisible sweater that will protect Cuphead from the Devil, as it only works because of "brotherly love". Meanwhile, the Devil throws a self-congratulatory party in Inkwell Hell, but Stickler, the auditor, arrives at the party to remind the Devil that he still needs to collect Cuphead's soul. After being constantly annoyed by Stickler, he leaves the party to collect it, only to discover Cuphead is now protected by the sweater, which electrocutes him when he touches it. The Devil creates multiple obstacles to trick Cuphead into taking the sweater off, but Mugman sees right through every single one. In his frustration, the Devil realizes that he can force Cuphead to take the sweater off by increasing the heat. Mugman protects Cuphead with a hug and they escape. The Devil returns to Inkwell Hell to continue his party, claiming to have stolen Cuphead's soul.
9	9	"Sweater Luck Next Time" (Part 2)	Clay Morrow	Dan Becker & Kennedy Tarell	February 18, 2022	105B
After lying to Stickler, the Devil confides to Henchman that he hasn't taken Cuphead's soul, and repeatedly attempts to steal it, each time being electrocuted by the sweater. The Devil arrives again, and Cuphead agrees to take the sweater off if he paints the fence for them. The Devil agrees, and Cuphead and Mugman sneak away to the fair. There, Cuphead admits that he took the sweater off hours ago. The Devil returns from paint, and, thinking it can help his plan, agrees to join Cuphead on the Obliterator. The Devil realizes that Cuphead isn't wearing the sweater and prepares to take his soul. Mugman arrives in the nick of time with the sweater and forces the Devil to wear it, electrocuting him. He returns to Inkwell Hell, and as Henchmen helps him to recover from his in injuries, putting him more pain, the Devil is confident that he would now take Cuphead's soul as Henchman says that the sweater is in an "undisclosed location".
10	10	"Dangerous Mugman"	Clay Morrow	Karl Hadrika & Zoë Moss	February 18, 2022	102B
Cuphead and Mugman burst into Porkrind's shop to play a Dirk Dangerous pinball game. Wanting peace, Porkrind convinces them to get a package for him from Mt. Eruptus. Mugman is initially afraid to go, but Cuphead gives him his Dirk Dangerous goggles, instilling him with courage. After falling down a waterfall, Mugman loses the goggles, but Cuphead decides not to tell him. `They eventually reach Mt. Eruptus and find the package: a large egg. Mugman discovers that he lost the goggles and gets scared again, but realizes that his courage came from within himself. The two retrieve the egg and bring it to Porkrind, who reveals he meant for them to pick up his dry cleaning at Mt. Eruptus Cleaners. Porkrind gives the boys the game so they do not annoy him and tells them to get out, watching the egg hatch into a three-headed dragon. Porkrind decides to turn it into lunch, only for its parent, Grim Matchstick, to arrive and burn his shop, taking the hatchling back.
11	11	"Dirt Nap"	Clay Morrow	Karl Hadrika & Zoë Moss	February 18, 2022	106B
Elder Kettle mistakenly believes that Cuphead and Mugman think he is old and disgusting after overhearing them talk about their pet worm. He tries to impress the two, but to no avail. Hearing their plan to bury the worm, he believes that they intend to kill him, and takes up arms, setting up deadly traps around the house. The boys bury the worm, which comes back to life, and return to find the house booby-trapped. Elder Kettle prepares to attack the boys but ends up falling into his traps. He pleads the boys not to kill him, but they quickly clear up the misunderstanding, making Elder Kettle relieved.
12	12	"In Charm's Way" (Part 1)	Adam Paloian	Megan Boyd & Fernando Puig	February 18, 2022	107A
After stepping on Elder Kettle's glasses while trying to steal cookies, Cuphead and Mugman head into the city to get them repaired. They encounter Ms. Chalice, a con artist who charms her way into getting free stuff by singing and tap dancing. The boys pursue her, wishing to know how to charm Elder Kettle. Chalice agrees and teaches them how to charm their way into getting what they want, befriending them along the way, and puts them to the test by having them charm their way into a cookie factory. The trio enjoys the free cookies, but Chalice accidentally sets off the silent alarm, and the police surround the factory. Panicking, Cuphead and Mugman accidentally knock themselves unconscious. With the bee police closing in and after unsuccessfully trying to wake them up, Chalice reluctantly abandons the brothers, assuming a ghostly form to escape.

=== Season 2 (2022) ===
No. overall	No. in season	Title	Directed by	Storyboard by	Original release date	Prod. code
13	1	"Jail-Broken" (Part 2)	Adam Paloian	Megan Boyd & Fernando Puig	August 19, 2022	107B
Following their arrest, Cuphead and Mugman unsuccessfully attempt to escape jail. As Mugman decides to give up and gets accustomed to jail life, Cuphead attempts to escape on his own but ends up in the electric chair room instead. Because of this failed attempt, Cuphead decides to give up as well, but Mugman, knowing it is unusual for his brother to surrender, comes up with an idea on how to get them both out. They attempt to leave by taking the next laundry boat out, but are discovered by Ms. Cyclops, the most feared prisoner in the jailhouse, who helps the two by attaching them to her ankle shackle and hurling them out of the prison. The second they arrive Elder Kettle tells the boys that Ms. Chalice stopped by to return his glasses and that they're grounded for breaking them, which the brothers graciously accept, knowing it is better than being stuck in jail.
14	2	"Charmed & Dangerous" (Part 3)	Clay Morrow	Dan Becker & Kennedy Tarrell	August 19, 2022	109B
Following the events of the previous episode, Ms. Chalice visits Cuphead and Mugman's home to hide from an angry mob who is chasing her and apologizes for abandoning them. After a long day of fun by stealing Elder Kettle's car and going to a dance contest, the trio encounters the angry mob again. Mugman tries to reason with them, telling them that, despite her scams, Chalice has made them happy. However, this instead prompts the mob to attack the boys as well, but before they can do so, Chalice assumes her ghostly form and successfully scares them off. Chalice tells the boys that she'll be laying low for a while but promises to see them again soon.
15	3	"A High Seas Adventure!"	Adam Paloian	Megan Boyd, Fernando Puig, Benjamin Arcand & Ian Vazquez	August 19, 2022	112A
While walking along the docks of Inkwell Isles, Cuphead convinces Mugman that they board a pirate ship, and they accidentally shove off to sea. The boys meet Captain Brineybeard, the ship's captain, who brings them along on his quest to find his crush: Cala Maria, a giant half-gorgon, half-siren creature who is known for turning anybody she sets her eyes on to stone. When they do meet Cala Maria, however, she turns Briney to stone and shipwrecks them on the creepy cove where she lives. When they awake on the shore, Mugman decides to keep his promise to help Briney win the heart of Cala Maria. When they meet Cala Maria again, Mugman presents her with Briney's gift. Cala Maria kisses Briney for his sweet gesture, prompting Briney to un-stone himself back to human form (with peg legs after Mugman broke them) as his act of love for her. Despite this, Cala Maria rejects Briney as a boyfriend, as she is too focused on her career as a sea monster, and decides to eat the crew, but not before giving them a 10-second head start. Mugman throws Cala Maria's gift in the way to save everyone, allowing the crew to escape back to shore. During the escape, Briney then dubs Mugman a real pirate for keeping his promise. Note: This is the first double-length episode, lasting 22 minutes.
16	4	"Another Brother"	Adam Paloian	Megan Boyd & Fernando Puig	August 19, 2022	103A
After a spat between him and Mugman over their conflicting ideals when Cuphead decides to use a rocket to cross a cliff to get to the movies, Cuphead sets out to find a surrogate brother and finds one in a bowl named Bowlboy, who is as impulsive as him. After a day of fun causing havoc, as they make the rocket attempt, Cuphead realizes that Bowlboy is crazier than him when he says that he has never done any of Cuphead's stuff before, and wants to learn from him, causing Cuphead to decide to not be with him anymore, and leaves him for the rocket attempt to fail to make him crash and get severe injuries. Mugman (who unsuccessfully tried to search for a surrogate brother as well) returns to Cuphead to apologize for his overprotective behaviour with another rocket that he strapped to himself and does the rocket attempt again, which fails again, causing a brutal crash-land for the two. They then reconcile while they are in the hospital, but the peace is short-lived, as Bowlboy (who somehow recovered from his injuries) is their doctor.
17	5	"Sweet Temptation"	Clay Morrow	Karl Hadrika & Zoë Moss	August 19, 2022	110B
In a parody of Hansel and Gretel, Cuphead is told to learn about resisting temptation after eating Mugman's leftover Halloween candy. While wandering in the woods, Cuphead discovers a world made entirely of sweets called Sugarland, where the ruler, Baroness Von Bon Bon, allows him to eat whatever he wants on the condition that he not tell anyone else about Sugarland and not eat her castle. Initially refusing the temptation, Cuphead quickly runs over to Mugman to tell him that he learned his lesson, but seeing how Mugman is still upset over his missing candy, he reluctantly breaks the Baroness' first rule by telling him about Sugarland. After the brothers indulge themselves in all the sweets they can eat, Mugman accidentally breaks the second rule by eating a part of the Baroness' castle, causing them to transform into candy, and being chased by the Baroness, who reveals that she eats people who turn into candy after they break her rules. The brothers manage to escape Sugarland, but they retain their candy forms, tempting Elder Kettle into eating them.
18	6	"The I Scream Man"	Adam Paloian	Benjamin Arcand & Ian Vazquez	August 19, 2022	110A
While Cuphead and Elder Kettle are away doing errands, Mugman pretends to be sick so he can get some peace and quiet to himself. While reading a book about a pirate named Mugbeard trying to kiss a Cala Maria-like character, he finds himself repeatedly disturbed by a gadfly ice cream man. After furiously yelling at him to leave and after getting rejected by the Cala Maria-like character, Mugman quickly realizes his mistake and searches for the ice cream man to apologize to him, only to be annoyed again when the ice cream man tells him that he got a new hat (due to Mugman criticizing his original hat during his angry rant) and spoils the book's ending by revealing that Mugbeard dies, causing a deranged Mugman to go insane and beat him up in retaliation. Note: This is the first episode where Cuphead is a minor character.
19	7	"Piano Lesson"	Clay Morrow	Dan Becker & Kennedy Tarrell	August 19, 2022	118B
Mugman is being trained by his piano teacher, Ludwig, in preparation for an upcoming contest where the grand prize is $10,000. However, Mugman proves to be inept at playing the piano properly, and Cuphead, who is initially disinterested, performs an improvised ragtime piece flawlessly. As a result, Ludwig now considers Cuphead to be his star pupil, making Mugman extremely jealous. After seeing how Cuphead refuses to step down from performing in the contest because he wants the prize money, Mugman decides to set up a falling piano trap at the concert hall where the contest is to be held. However, when Mugman arrives home, he discovers that Cuphead is home as well, saying that Ludwig never came to pick him up. Upon entering their house, they hear on the radio Cuphead's music piece being played by Ludwig; it turns out that Ludwig had plagiarized Cuphead's piece in order to win the contest for himself. Suddenly, Mugman's trap activates and crushes Ludwig. Cuphead and Mugman reconcile afterwards.
20	8	"Release the Demons!" (Part 1)	Adam Paloian & Clay Morrow	Benjamin Arcand & Ian Vazquez	August 19, 2022	108A
Tormented by his prior failures to get Cuphead's soul, the Devil seeks revenge by sending his third finest demons (after accidentally obliterating the first two sets in anger) and King Dice above ground to capture him. Meanwhile, Cuphead and Mugman go to a maze with spooky puppets at the fair, so that the latter can prove the former froze in terror at the sight of a horse head puppet years ago. King Dice, desperate to redeem himself in the Devil's eyes, gets rid of the demons by tricking them into attacking themselves so that he can capture Cuphead himself, prompting the Devil to release his terror-inducing Four Horsemen upon learning what had happened, which indeed causes Cuphead, as well as King Dice, who was about to attack Cuphead, to freeze in terror. After they fail due to Mugman unwittingly scaring away the Horsemen's horses with the horse head puppet, the Devil decides to go to capture Cuphead by himself. Suddenly, Stickler arrives and reveals to the Devil that, because he failed to obtain Cuphead's soul within 30 days, Cuphead's soul has reverted back to its original owner, thus making the attempt of taking his soul officially unauthorized. The Devil tries to obliterate Stickler, but he is unharmed, revealing that Henchman gave him the invisible sweater. Dismayed by this, the Devil gives up and returns to Inkwell Hell, only for the elevator to get broken with him and Stickler sharing it. Note: This is the second double-length episode, lasting 19 minutes.
21	9	"Dead Broke"	Adam Paloian	Megan Boyd & Fernando Puig	August 19, 2022	111A
After an unexpected reunion, Cuphead, Mugman, and Ms. Chalice go to get some ice cream, but after their ice cream is taken away due to insufficient funds, they enact a scam as "ghost removers" to earn money from everyone. However, they end up with more than what they bargained for when they encounter and unintentionally release ghostly quadruplets by saying their names below their respective picture frames, who have been trapped inside them for years and want to switch places with them before the clock strikes 12, which will make whoever or whatever is trapped permanently seized. After a long chase and repeated moments of being captured, Chalice appears in her ghost form and trap the quadruplets in a single frame as the clock strikes 12. Cuphead, Mugman, and Chalice prepare to go get their ice cream, only to discover that their piggy bank is missing; it is revealed to have been accidentally trapped in the frame with the quadruplets.
22	10	"Rats All, Folks"	Clay Morrow	Karl Hadrika, Zoë Moss & Casey Alexander	August 19, 2022	112B
Cuphead and Mugman's attempts to prepare a surprise cake for Elder Kettle are repeatedly hampered by a German-accented rat named Werner Werman, who tries to claim their house for himself. They try blocking him from coming out, setting up the floor with mouse traps, whacking him up, blasting him with a trumpet, getting the most ferocious feral cat in the world, and using cheese as bait, but are foiled by Werner's cunning ingenuity and inventions and he eventually eats up their cake and pins them to the wall with kitchen utensils. Elder Kettle figures this out and after being told by Cuphead and Mugman about Werner, he decides to battle Werner, finally tricking him into signing a deed paper with dynamite after Werner threatens to kill Cuphead and Mugman, which explodes on Werner and destroys the cottage, forcing him to leave.
23	11	"Say Cheese!"	Clay Morrow	Dan Becker & Kennedy Tarrell	August 19, 2022	113B
Elder Kettle's attempt to get a picture-perfect family portrait proves difficult after the brothers discover an ad revealing a humiliating secret from Elder Kettle's past: he was the winner of a baby contest as a baby but was bullied as a child due to it. The brothers blackmail Elder Kettle with the photo in an attempt to get him to agree to their demands. Not wanting to get humiliated again, Elder Kettle attempts to get the camera back, but it is accidentally destroyed by Cuphead and Mugman. Even with the evidence destroyed, an enraged Elder Kettle chases the brothers, who are continuing to fight for what they want, around the city intending to kill them simply because they know too much, only to get arrested by the bee police for acting like a madman (along with Cuphead and Mugman implicitly for their prison escape from the cookie factory caper). The brothers and Elder Kettle reconcile, and they use their mugshots as a family portrait.
24	12	"Lost in the Woods"	Clay Morrow	Jules Bridgers	August 19, 2022	113A
In the fall, Elder Kettle sends Cuphead and Mugman to search for more wood in the woods near their home to prepare for winter. However, Cuphead's recklessness forces him and Mugman to go in different directions when they become lost in the woods. After wandering on his own and becoming needy and ravenous, Cuphead finds Mugman in a cabin built by himself and they fight over it after the latter spitefully dismisses him for getting them into their current mess, only for Elder Kettle, having done all the work, to unexpectedly show up, making them realize that they were near home the whole time. Mugman apologizes to Cuphead for what happened, but Cuphead, who has not learned his lesson, ties him up to a large rocket, which blows up to the sky.
25	13	"The Devil's Pitchfork" (Part 2)	Clay Morrow	Karl Hadrika & Zoë Moss	August 19, 2022	108B
After seeing how his reputation in Inkwell Hell got ruined due his failures to get Cuphead's soul, the Devil decides to have fun wreaking havoc around the Inkwell Isles in an attempt to restore it but misplaces his pitchfork in the woods. Meanwhile, Cuphead and Mugman find the Devil's pitchfork and have fun with it around the Inkwell Isles until the Devil arrives and finds out that they are the culprits. Cuphead repeatedly zaps the Devil with the pitchfork, before the latter accidentally reveals the former's expired soul debt in a rage, leaving Cuphead and Mugman surprised and delighted, but Cuphead still refuses to give the pitchfork back. Enraged, the Devil spitefully kidnaps Mugman and takes him to Inkwell Hell, leaving Cuphead shocked and devastated. Note: This is the first episode to not use the regular ending theme; an ominous theme is played instead to reference the cliffhanger ending.

=== Season 3 (2022) ===
No. overall	No. in season	Title	Directed by	Storyboard by	Original release date	Prod. code
26	1	"The Devil's Revenge!" (Part 3)	Adam Paloian	Benjamin Arcand & Ian Vazquez	November 17, 2022	109A
Following Mugman's capture, Cuphead decides to find a way to rescue Mugman on his own. Meanwhile, in Inkwell Hell where Mugman is imprisoned, the Devil makes a bet with Henchman that he can break Mugman's spirit before the clock strikes twelve, with the Devil having to take Henchman on a trip if the former loses. Cuphead enlists the help of Quadratus, who tells him about the Ancient Pitchfork Ownership and gives him a piece of chalk that can take him to Inkwell Hell. Cuphead finally rescues Mugman but the Devil chases them throughout Inkwell Hell. During the chase, the Devil accidentally destroys his soul vault while charging toward them, releasing all the souls again. Cuphead later reminds the Devil about the Pitchfork Ownership, and they make a deal for the pitchfork and Mugman. Afterwards, Cuphead goes to a rebuilt CarnEvil again and plays Soul Ball once more (to Mugman's dismay), while Henchman travels to Hawaii, where he joins Quadratus. Note: This is the third double-length episode, lasting 21 minutes.
27	2	"Don't Answer the Door"	Adam Paloian	Fernando Puig	November 18, 2022	122A
In a sequel to "Baby Bottle", Elder Kettle goes to get his mustache waxed following a prank by Cuphead and Mugman. Soon after, the brothers see a basket at the door. Thinking Baby Bottle has returned, they conclude that if they don't let him in, he can't hurt them. Later, Cuphead and Mugman decide to check the door again after hearing growling, where they find a bear who steals the basket. The two reluctantly search for Baby Bottle, and eventually find that the bear has already eaten him. The boys return home to tell Elder Kettle what happened only for him to reveal that it wasn't Baby Bottle, but an ordinary bottle of milk he wrapped and put in the basket as payback for their prank. The bear appears at the doorstep, telling them not to leave any bottle of milk because bears are tempted to drink milk. However, the real Baby Bottle comes to the doorstep, beating the bear up offscreen.
28	3	"CupStaged"	Clay Morrow	Dan Becker & Kennedy Tarrell	November 18, 2022	111B
Theater owner Sally Stageplay holds auditions for her new space opera, Cup-Rogers vs. The Meteor. Cuphead, Mugman, and the Devil fight for the role of the "Cup-Rogers" at the auditions. However, after the three upstage each other, Sally disqualifies the trio and kicks them out of the theater. On the big night of the space opera, Cup-Rogers, along with Catman, end up being played by Sally herself, with the Devil being a prop boy while Cuphead and Mugman are the curtain boys.
29	4	"Roadkill"	Clay Morrow & Adam Paloian	Nick Lauer & Austin Faber	November 18, 2022	116B
The Devil tries to enjoy his day but finds that his belongings, including Henchman, have been confiscated by a spell called "The Bubbles of Failure" due to his failure to collect a single soul in months. Stickler informs the Devil that if he can't collect a single soul within one business day, all his belongings will remain permanently seized. As such, the Devil pettily decides to go after Cuphead's soul again, despite being told that any soul would do. However, along the way, he gets hit by Elder Kettle's car after he tried to keep an eye on Cuphead and Mugman while they go to the movies. Elder Kettle takes him in, mistaking him for a humble house cat, whom he affectionately calls "Mrs. Meow Meow" and treats and pampers him like one, much to the jealousy of Elder Kettle's pet goat. Initially, the Devil decides to claim Elder Kettle's soul to fulfill the requirements, but when Elder Kettle tells the Devil how much he loves him, the Devil decides to take the soul of a telephone instead. The Devil returns down to Inkwell Hell and hands the telephone's soul over to Stickler, fulfilling the requirements and dispelling the Bubbles of Failure. He then shoos Stickler and Henchman away before he secretly plays with a ball of yarn he brought with him. Elder Kettle realizes “Mrs. Meow Meow” is gone, and takes his pet goat back with him, satisfying the latter.
30	5	"Holiday Tree-dition"	Clay Morrow	Jared Morgan & Zoë Moss	November 18, 2022	115A
Christmas is around the corner, so Elder Kettle has Cuphead and Mugman go to Porkrind's shop to buy the perfect Christmas tree as part of the "holiday tradition". However, Porkrind sells all of his trees before the boys can buy any. Instead, he suggests the boys find their tree. Cuphead and Mugman eventually find a tree up in the mountains and plan to bring it home to Elder Kettle, but it slides away in the snow while they fight over who'll bring the tree home. They catch up to it but end up in a cavern full of bears. Then, the brothers and their tree slide through the mountains until they end up in a shed filled with industrial buzzsaws. Despite the chaos, Cuphead, Mugman, and their new tree miraculously survive as they end up back at their house, where they and Elder Kettle adorn their tree with Christmas lights. However, when they plug in the lights the tree is shocked by the electricity and burns to a crisp. Cuphead and Mugman initially cry for ruining the tree, the holiday tradition, and Christmas, but Elder Kettle forgives them, saying that the tradition was mainly about family and doing things together. The brothers and Elder Kettle continue to celebrate.
31	6	"A Very Devil Christmas"	Adam Paloian	Karl Hadrika, Benjamin Arcand, Fernando Puig & Ian Vazquez	November 18, 2022	115B
In a parody of The Santa Clause, the Devil joyfully wreaks havoc in Inkwell Isle on Christmas Eve. While doing so, he stumbles upon a choo-choo train set from beyond a toy store window. He also overhears a kid being told by his mother that he didn't get the toys he wanted last year because he ended up on Santa's naughty list. This leads the Devil to ask Henchman how he can get on Santa's nice list. Initially, Henchman protests against this by saying that the nice list isn't exactly the Devil's 'kind of list' because he's evil, but he follows his boss's lead on his scheme to get on Santa's nice list. They travel to the North Pole and meet Santa, who tells the Devil he's at the top spot on the naughty list, but if he can be nice until midnight, he'll reconsider. This suggestion fails miserably, which leads Santa to take drastic measures by casting a ritual spell on the Devil that gradually transforms him into Santa Claus himself. The only way for the Devil to reverse the spell is to perform Santa's duties. The Devil reluctantly agrees to do this and delivers presents to every nice kid in Inkwell Isle. However, the Devil cringes when Henchman tells him that the last house, he has to deliver presents to is Cuphead and Mugman's house. When he arrives, he reluctantly delivers all the presents but is surprised to find that one of the presents - specifically for Cuphead - happens to be the choo-choo train he eyed at the toy store. Remembering the times he was humiliated by Cuphead, the Devil schemes to keep it for himself, but Cuphead catches him unaware that he's doing Santa's duties. Cuphead admits he hasn't been a nice kid lately but being able to see Santa in person made up for it. Surprisingly, the Devil relates and ends up giving the choo-choo train to Cuphead. This one act of kindness puts the Devil's name on the nice list. The Devil and Henchman return to the North Pole, and the spell is lifted. The Devil asks Santa if he'll get his choo-choo train now, but Santa states that he received something more valuable: the joy of being nice. Enraged and upset, the Devil and Henchman return to Inkwell Hell, where the Devil is surprised to find a giant choo-choo train in his throne room. Immediately, the Devil's mood positively changes, and he enjoys his new choo-choo train immensely, believing Santa came through with his promise, when in actuality, Henchman secretly built the train for him, and he wishes the Devil a Merry Christmas. Note: This is the first and so far, only triple-length episode, lasting at least 30 minutes, acting as a Special Christmas episode, and the second episode for Cuphead to be a minor character, with Mugman's absence this time. The Devil also acts as an anti-heroic protagonist.
32	7	"Special Delivery" (Part 1)	Clay Morrow	Jared Morgan & Zoë Moss	November 18, 2022	121A
Porkrind's delivery contact, Jerry, arrives at the shop to leave a package behind that must be delivered to Ribby at the Fly Trap before sundown but gets knocked out after Cuphead, Mugman, and Ms. Chalice's baseball breaks through Porkrind's window. Porkrind decides to send the trio to make the delivery for him; due to Cuphead and Mugman's prior encounter with Ribby and Croaks, Porkrind gives the brothers and Chalice disguises. Cuphead, Mugman, and Chalice take a peek at the contents of the package and are surprised to find a pair of shoes. Back at Porkrind's shop, Jerry wakes up and incoherently mutters about the package, saying that the shoes are exploding shoes that will activate at sundown, causing Porkrind to feel bad and unsuccessfully try to wash his hands of what he did. On their way to the Fly Trap, Cuphead and Chalice decide to follow through with their promise to deliver the shoes to Ribby, but Mugman wants to keep the shoes for himself. The trio fights over the shoes, but the package ends up in Ribby's hands anyway. In the end, it is revealed that Croaks was the sender, and he sent the shoes to Ribby as payback for a fight they had. The two frog brothers reconcile, and ultimately decline the package and have Cuphead, Mugman, and Chalice return it to Porkrind. When they return to his shop, Porkrind, who was about to exit and save them, gives the trio their baseball back and sends them away before the shoes explode, destroying Porkrind's shop again. The explosion alerts the Devil who eyes Chalice and finds out that she has become friends with the brothers, stating that her friendship with them will come in very useful to him, hinting that there's something suspicious going on between them.
33	8	"Down & Out"	Adam Paloian	Benjamin Arcand, Ian Vazquez & Sam Kessler	November 18, 2022	122B
Sometime after being fired by the Devil in "Roll the Dice", King Dice loses all of his fortune and fame and becomes homeless. He initially blames Cuphead for his downfall (since Cuphead has participated in Roll the Dice and lost, causing King Dice's dismissal), but Cuphead, who plans on becoming an active act manager with Mugman doing a ventriloquism act, offers to become King Dice's manager and helps him make a comeback. Cuphead, Mugman, and Elder Kettle freshen him up and start their club at an empty barnhouse. With time, King Dice's comeback becomes a major success. Meanwhile, in Inkwell Hell, the Devil and Henchman are bored to death with Stickler's ledger presentations and go to seek fun on the surface when Stickler isn't looking. They decide to go to the barnhouse club where they find King Dice. The Devil tries to confront King Dice, but he reveals that he's been working on collecting Cuphead's soul and getting his job back this whole time by creating a business contract that'll also give ownership of his soul to the Devil. However, when King Dice brings it to his attention, Cuphead unexpectedly declines, revealing that Mugman's ventriloquism act has now become unexpectedly more valuable. Devastated, King Dice leaves, but the Devil decides to take him back, stating that he would now entertain all demons in Inkwell Hell with his talent. King Dice gladly accepts and returns to Inkwell Hell.
34	9	"JoyRide" (Part 2)	Clay Morrow	Nick Lauer & Austin Faber	November 18, 2022	121B
After the events of "Special Delivery", Elder Kettle takes Cuphead and Mugman to the city for a fun day, much to their initial confusion. They drive over to the optical store to buy expensive sunglasses. As they leave, Elder Kettle tap-dances out of the store with Cuphead and Mugman in tow. Immediately, it is revealed that Ms. Chalice possessed Elder Kettle to take the boys to the city. The trio think nothing of it and go to the amusement park and decide to go get their fortunes. But Chalice's fortune turns out to be a calling card from the Devil. She hides it from Cuphead and Mugman and goes into a back alley where Henchman greets her, and escorts a scared Chalice to Inkwell Hell, as the Devil wants to talk with her.
35	10	"Dance with Danger" (Part 3)	Clay Morrow	Jared Morgan & Zoë Moss	November 18, 2022	123A
While heading down to Inkwell Hell, Ms. Chalice has a flashback of her backstory. When she was a child, she used to live in an orphanage under the strict authority of its caretakers. Unhappy with her life in the orphanage, especially when the caretakers refuse to let her express her love of dancing, she escapes and ends up in an alley. While searching for food, she gets grossed out by a bug crawling on her arm, causing her to perform a short, unexpected dance, making a passerby give her some money for being so charming. Now finding purpose in her life, Chalice spends the next several years charming the citizens of Inkwell Isle to get things for free. One day, during a performance, she is suddenly run over by a trolley, killing her and sending her soul to Inkwell Hell, where she meets the Devil. The Devil sways Chalice to make a deal with him where, if she does a random favor for him, she can get her body back. After the deal is made, Chalice comes back to life, along with getting the ability to also assume a ghostly form and proceeds to rob the optical store to evade a police officer, revealing that she made her deal with the Devil on the same day she met Cuphead and Mugman. After Chalice's flashback concludes, she arrives at Inkwell Hell and meets up with the Devil, who reminds her of the random favor she promised to fulfill. However, due to the Devil having learned that she is friends with Cuphead and Mugman, he reveals that the favor he has made is for her to betray them, much to Chalice's horror. Note: This is the only episode where Cuphead and Mugman are absent, only to appear in Chalice's backstory.
36	11	"The Devil & Ms. Chalice" (Part 4)	Adam Paloian	Benjamin Arcand & Michael Ruocco	November 18, 2022	123B
After being faced with a death threat by the Devil, Ms. Chalice reluctantly agrees to trick Cuphead and Mugman into signing a contract that will force them to turn in their souls. However, before Cuphead and Mugman can sign it, Chalice breaks down and tells them everything. Enraged, the Devil prepares to kill Chalice until she starts an argument with the Devil over who is the best dancer in the world, prompting the two to settle this with a dance battle. After a long duel, Chalice almost wins until she accidentally stumbles upon some marbles that Cuphead gave her as a gift earlier. Just before the Devil can finish off Chalice, Cuphead challenges him to a rock-paper-scissors game to save Chalice, offering his and Mugman's souls to the Devil in addition to Chalice's if he loses. The Devil accepts, but Cuphead beats him easily even after the Devil requests more rounds, forcing the Devil to finally accept defeat for good. Inkwell Isle's inhabitants celebrate Cuphead, Mugman, and Chalice as heroes. The next month after not being met by the Devil again, the trio discovers that the Devil has opened a casino. This attracts Cuphead's interest, to Mugman and Chalice's dismay. Note: This is the fourth and final double-length episode, lasting at least 22 minutes. It also acts as a prequel to the game.
