= Acecraft =

2025 video game

- Developer: Vizta Games
- Publishers: Vizta Games (Asia); Skystone Games (global)
- Producer: Darren "Chen" Lu
- Platforms: Android, iOS
- Release: August 28, 2025
- Genre: Shoot 'em up
- Modes: Single-player, Multiplayer

Acecraft (stylized as ACECRAFT) (Note: Chinese: 发条总动员; pinyin: Fātiáo Zǒngdòngyuán; lit. 'Clockwork Mobilization') is a 2025 shoot 'em up video game developed by Vizta Games, a subsidiary of Moonton, and published internationally by Skystone Games. In Acecraft, players pilot aircraft through looping boss encounters, absorbing pink projectiles to fuel special attacks, combining random roguelike skills, and optionally partnering in two-player cooperative play.

Acecraft was developed by Vizta Games, a subsidiary of Moonton, and produced by Darren "Chen" Lu. It entered a soft launch on Android in the United States in July 2024, followed by a closed beta test in Thailand from May 18 to June 17, 2025. The game was officially released worldwide on August 28, 2025, with Skystone Games handling publishing outside Asia.

== Development ==
The development of Acecraft (originally known as ACE Wonder) started at the end of 2023. The game's rubber hose animation was claimed to be entirely hand-drawn frame by frame in 24 frames-per-second.

The game received a soft launch on Android in the United States in July 2024. A larger closed beta test took place in Thailand and other Southeast Asian regions from May to June 2025, providing expanded content and early access to multiplayer features.

In July 2025, the pre-registration trailer was released, and the developers announced an official collaboration with the Tom and Jerry franchise owned by Warner Bros. (via Turner Entertainment Co.) the following month. Pre-registration for the global launch opened in late August 2025, with the total number of pre-registrations exceeding 8 million on August 27, and Acecraft was officially launched worldwide on August 28, 2025.

Following an official collaboration with Tom and Jerry, the game launched an update in October 2025 featuring Looney Tunes characters Bugs Bunny and Daffy Duck, also owned by Warner Bros.

== Gameplay ==
Acecraft is a vertical scrolling shooter game in which pilots and their wingmen fight against waves of monsters. Every stage scrolls upwards with a task of taking down enemies that appear while avoiding their projectiles, eventually reaching a boss fight at the end. The pilots can move around by holding the finger on the screen, which will also make their weapons fire continuously during that time. Inspired by Cuphead, pilots that are standing still are able to absorb pink colored enemy projectiles to unleash a parry counterattack. After a certain amount of cleared waves, the players can select a special power-up for the pilot. The game can be played solo, or as a duo in cooperative mode.

== Plot ==
The game takes place in Cloudia, a realm suspended 260,000 feet above the ground where anthropomorphic creatures live in harmony. This peace is shattered when the Nightmare Legion attacks, spreading chaos across the floating isles and driving many inhabitants into madness.

To counter the threat, a group known as the Ark of Hope, led by flight instructor Mister X, mobilizes its elite pilots to confront the Legion and reclaim the stolen Key of Destiny. Among them is Ekko, a new recruit who joins forces with Joey, Amelia, Charlie, Summer, and Ironarm. Together, they travel through the Clockwork Islands, mediating conflicts such as the war between Wonderland and Sweetopia, rescuing allies in Ghost Swamp, and battling corruption in Illumination Bay, ultimately preparing for a final confrontation with the Nightmare Legion.

== Access ==
On January 19, 2026, the game became unavailable for mobile users to play on their devices in the United States. The official Facebook page posted an update on February 13, 2026, confirming that the game will return to the US region in the near future.

The mobile game returned sometime in April for most devices in the United States, except for the Google Play Store app. It is unknown when the game will return to the Google Play app store.

== See also ==
- Cuphead, a 2017 game that has greatly contributed to the revival of cartoon-like rubber hose animation in video games
