= Icelolly.com =

Price comparison website

- Company type: Private limited company
- Industry: Travel
- Founded: 16 December 2005; 19 years ago in Wyke, West Yorkshire, United Kingdom
- Headquarters: Park Row House, 19-20 Park Row, Leeds, West Yorkshire, United Kingdom
- Area served: United Kingdom
- Key people: Richard Singer (CEO); Tony Iacobucci (CTO); Neil Beardsmore (Finance Director); Stuart Barrett (Sales Director); Amy Peers (Head of People)
- Services: Comparison shopping website
- Owner: Palatine Private Equity
- Website: icelolly.com

icelolly.com, part of icelolly Marketing Limited, is a UK-based holiday price comparison website and deals platform.

== History ==
The company was founded in December 2005 by Adrian Walton and Lesley Etienne. In 2013, the company underwent a management buyout backed by Palatine Private Equity for £17 million. Since then, icelolly.com has relocated their offices from Wyke, Bradford to Leeds city centre, West Yorkshire.

Andrew Latham replaced outgoing CEO Dave Clayton on an interim basis in May 2014 and got a permanent position in December of that year. That same year the business was rebranded, with a logo and website makeover.

In December 2017, former Travelzoo president Richard Singer was appointed as CEO.
