= King Dice =

Cuphead character

- Cuphead character
- King Dice in Cuphead
- First game: Cuphead (2017)
- Created by: Joseph Coleman
- Voiced by: Alana Bridgewater; Wayne Brady (The Cuphead Show!)

King Dice is a character in Cuphead, a 2017 run and gun video game developed by Studio MDHR, acting as the game's secondary antagonist. He tasks protagonists Cuphead and Mugman with collecting souls for his employer, the Devil, and fights the pair in his casino after they succeed. In the game's animated series adaptation, The Cuphead Show!, he fills a similar role, now serving as a game show host instead of a casino owner. Created by Joseph Coleman, King Dice was meant as a tribute to black artists from the 1930s era, namely singer Cab Calloway. In the game, he is voiced by Alana Bridgewater, while in the series, he is voiced by Wayne Brady.

King Dice was well received for his characterization and mannerisms, and has been praised for being a more present and memorable villain than the game's main antagonist, the Devil. However, some criticisms arose from the game's source material, which references 1930s cartoons, and the racial connotations. Additional discussion arose in this context around the use of Calloway as inspiration for the character, and how King Dice's theme song, "Die House", directly references Calloway's "Minnie the Moocher".

== Appearances ==
King Dice is an anthropomorphic die in Cuphead, a 2017 run and gun video game developed by Studio MDHR. Working for the game's main antagonist, the Devil, he tasks protagonists Cuphead and Mugman with collecting the contracts of those the Devil has made deals with. Once they achieve this goal, he acts as the penultimate final boss of the game they must defeat in order to process. The battle consists of several boss fights that must be fought in one go, before taking on King Dice himself.

The character speaks through his theme song, "Die House", which is sung by Alana Bridgewater. Cuphead composer Kristofer Maddigan wanted King Dice to sound like Cab Calloway but in a slightly different direction, and considered the idea of a woman voicing the character instead. Bridgewater was chosen for the role, and provided several different voices and sounds for the development team to narrow down. In addition to the song, Bridgewater provided the vocals for King Dice's boss fight.

In The Cuphead Show!, an animated series adaptation of the game, his character is revised to be a radio game show host, albeit still a villain working with the Devil and now directly collecting souls for him, eyeing Cuphead and Mugman as his next unwitting targets. After his defeat, he becomes destitute and lives in the alley behind his old theater. Cuphead and Mugman discover him and become his agents, cleaning him up and helping him get his old job back, unaware that he's in league with the Devil. In this series, he is voiced by actor Wayne Brady. Series developer Dave Wasson wanted an actor for the role that could sing and one that hosted an actual game show. Brady fulfilled both requirements, and was already actively interested in the role.

== Conception and design ==
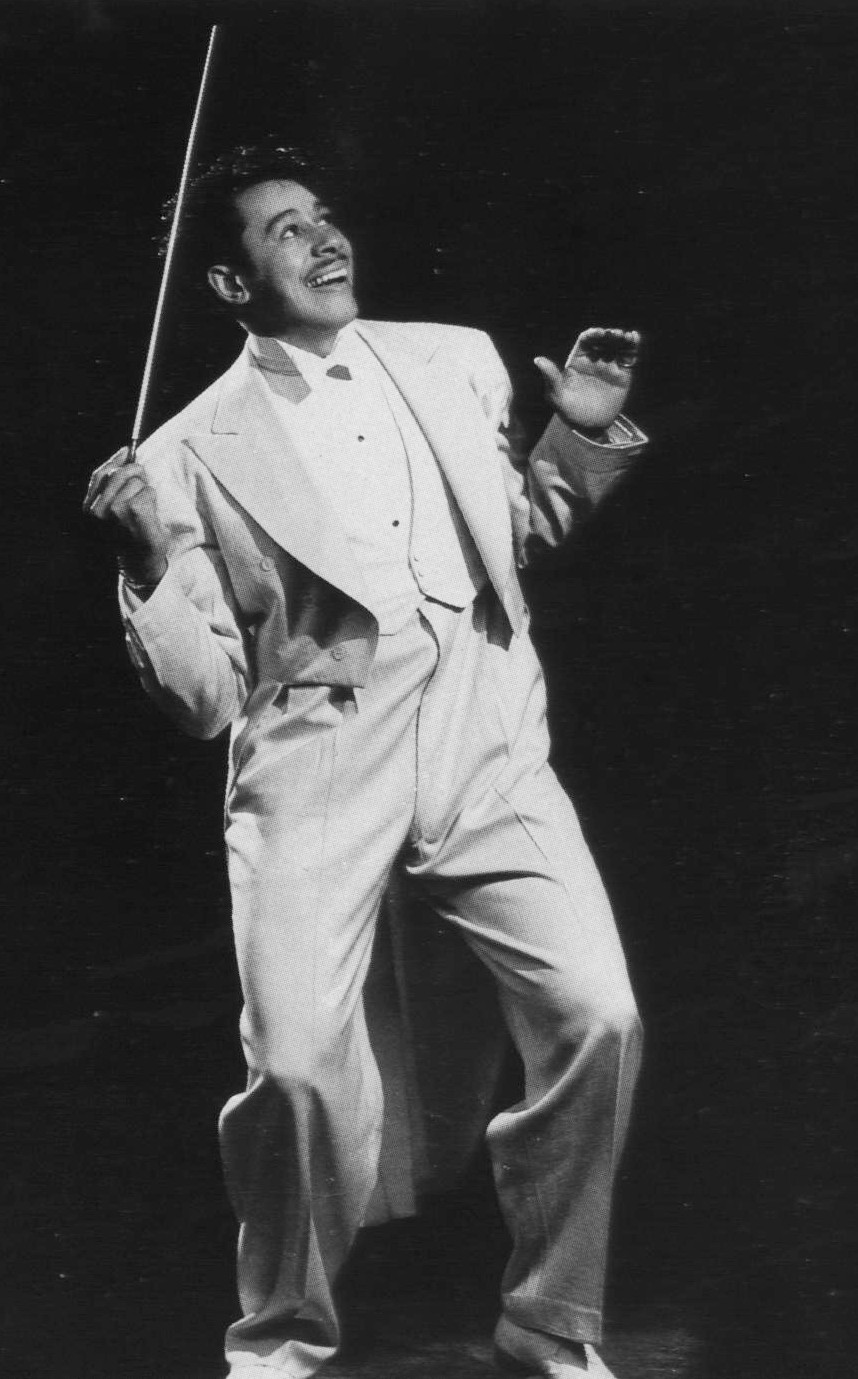
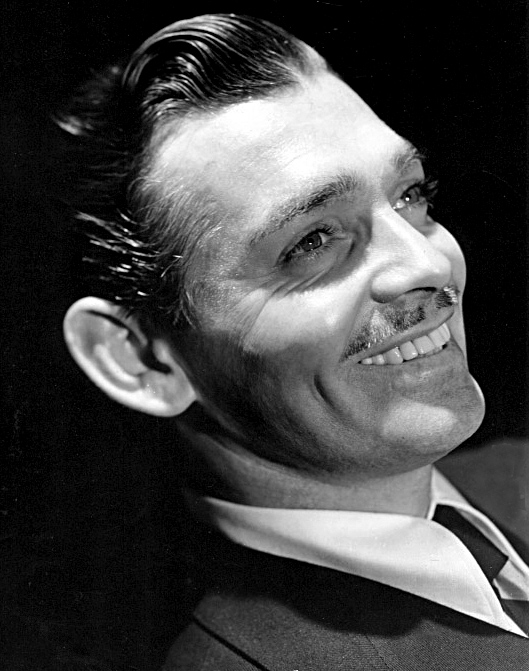
King Dice's design was inspired by several fictional and real-world figures, among them Cab Calloway and Clark Gable.

Created by African American animator Joseph Coleman, King Dice was designed as a combination of a Dick Tracy comic mobster, actor Clark Gable, singer Cab Calloway, and DC Comics villain the Joker. Additional references include the Coachman, a minor villain from the 1940 Disney animated film Pinocchio. His head is a large six-sided die with his face in place of the one, with a pencil-thin mustache curving up the sides of his lips. Special attention was paid to the sides of the die to ensure it had the correct number of dots on each side. Meanwhile, his body is humanoid, dressed in a purple suit with coattails and white gloves covering his hands and a large purple bow-tie on his neck. Early concepts of the character's outfit considered a checkered jacket and black pants instead.

In an interview, Coleman described the development process as the character designers being given a theme and an idea, and having to design a character around that. With King Dice, he wanted to create a character that paid tribute to black artists of the 1930s era that helped pave the way for people such as himself in the entertainment industry. Coleman leaned heavily into Cab Calloway as a reference, down to the character's personality and movements. Meanwhile, the backgrounds for King Dice's battle, designed by Caitlin Russell, took inspiration from the paintings of black artist Aaron Douglas, which Coleman felt helped define Dice's identity.

For the boss fight itself, several ideas were considered by Coleman, including one where King Dice physically attacked in his normal appearance with a trumpet, as well as spinning and dancing moves. This was done to fit his musical personality, while also having him fight using attacks based off visual puns regarding the sides of a die. Ultimately, they decided to lean into casino imagery, with him summoning cards that walked towards the player to attack them. The fight itself leading up to King Dice was inspired by the Treasure-developed game Gunstar Heroes, specifically its "Dice Palace" level, with the development team citing Treasure as a huge influence on Cuphead. They felt recreating the gimmick of that level in the game helped solidify the character and help bring his aesthetic into focus.

=== In The Cuphead Show! ===
For The Cuphead Show!, the production team admitted they knew very little of the character outside of him being a villain, working for the Devil, and being smooth. As both he and the Devil were intended to be grandiose characters, they worked to make the characters distinct from one another: the Devil would be portrayed as emotional and compulsive, while King Dice would be conniving and calculating. To capture the feel of 1930s animation, King Dice was given a wide range of facial expressions to emulate how expressive cartoons were at the time. So many were created during this process that art director Andrea Fernández suggested making just one head chart for the character, which she felt helped them animate him beautifully.

For his introduction, the team wanted to recreate the feel of rotoscoped animation, as done in Fleischer Studios cartoons. They felt that while it might have been seen as "cheating" in modern animation, it served as a stylistic choice that helped the characters feel surreal due to the exaggerated movements of the performers. To avoid having to film an actual performer, storyboard artist Benjamin Arcand used a method of "overposing" the animation to simulate the effect. The character's return in the show meanwhile came about from the production staff taking a liking to him. Several pitches were considered, including one where he would act as Mugman's piano teacher, but they ultimately decided to collaborate on ideas for the episode.

== Critical reception ==
University of California researcher Elisabet Fonts described King Dice as possibly the most iconic of Cuphead's bosses, and an example of how each combined theatrical references with its own visual identity. Stating that he combined elegance and menace, Fonts saw him as a revival of the vaudeville villain with his "angular silhouette, syncopated jazz movements, and theatrically arrogant expressions" as he acted as a master of ceremonies for the game. She further felt his visual identity was sustained by a sharp silhouette that conveyed "authority and sophistication", with his head functioning as a strong visual emblem, while his outfit and color scheme indicated his performative nature. Brazilian professors Adriana Falqueto and Viviana Mónica Vermes wrote in a paper for the journal Revista Científica/FAP that the character's reference to Clark Gable served as his strongest visual aspect, with the thin mustache being an exact match and helping to tie the character to the 1930s era.

Fonts further pointed to how his animations were extremely fluid, giving the player a sense that he is dancing to jazz. She saw this as important as it not only emphasized his flamboyant style, but helped to indicate a visual rhythm of how to avoid his attacks during his boss fight. She stated that King Dice subverted the traditional final boss role, in that while he was not the ultimate villain of the game, he served as the most theatrical and in her opinion most memorable due to his stylistic impact. Carlos Zotomayor of Game Rant echoed this sentiment, pointing out how he was a frequently visible character in the game compared to the Devil, encountering the protagonists regularly and serving as a frequent obstruction. Zotomayor stated that while Dice's goals were not particularly nefarious, he was more of a standout villain due to how willing he was to get involved directly compared to the Devil, and the impact of his music and boss fight.

While Dice's signature song, "Die House", was praised for demonstrating his menace, it has been compared to Calloway's "Minnie the Moocher" song, complete with a dueling call-and-response chorus section. However, the vocal performance has been compared more to that of Louis Armstrong than Calloway, eliciting further discussion.

In a thesis examining the themes of Cuphead, Bowling Green State University professor Patricia Rose McKow Schuelke felt that the use of Cab Calloway as a reference for King Dice continued a legacy of Calloway's depictions in animated media. This was furthered by how the singer's persona served as a nostalgia through-line for Cuphead in how King Dice dresses and use of his "Hi-de-ho!" catchphrase. Schuelke also felt this was reflected in how King Dice references to the opening line of Calloway's song "Minnie the Moocher" as well as its call-and-response section, which Dice uses to establish his threatening demeanor, while in the original song Calloway's use could be seen as his own assertion of musical dominance as the chorus struggled to keep up.

Schuelke further examined the musical differences between Dice and Calloway and how they brought different meanings, in particular Bridgewater's performance as a black woman and how her "gravely, raspy tone" felt to her more in line with singer Louis Armstrong. She questioned if this may have been due to Armstrong being a more well-known figure, but also suggested Calloway's tone may have not been menacing enough for the figure, supported by the music itself providing a sense of isolation for the level itself. Going further, Schuelke questioned the use of Calloway as a reference for a villain, effectively taking his personality and infusing it with sin and evil in a depiction of the Devil's right hand man. She suggested this played into some racial themes of 1930s cartoons, which often depicted black people as plot devices as a means of control rather than portray them as complex figures.

Yussef Cole in an article for Unwinnable magazine cited King Dice of an element indicative of 1930s Harlem and jazz culture, specifically in how it referenced Calloway who himself was often caricaturized in cartoons of that era. He further pointed to how with the establishment of the Hays Code, Harlem culture and jazz were both often associated with sin and a hellish afterlife, further illustrated by cartoons of the time in which one portrayed an all-black heaven as being named "Pair-o-Dice". He felt that as a result Cuphead's reliance of images of gambling, heaven, and hell echoed these tropes depicting moral statements about the perceived "lazy and savage blacks of Harlem". While he did admit there was some good in how Cuphead tried to avoid these tropes, the depiction of Calloway's characterization as an anthropomorphic dice harkened to him similar depictions of Calloway in Betty Boop cartoons where his likeness was often buried as a means to avoid portraying him as black.

Lisa Scoggin in the book The Intersection of Animation, Video Games, and Music observed how King Dice's theme song in Cuphead reflected Calloway's music while conveying several elements that 1930s audiences would often associate with jazz, such as urbanity, gambling, and a sense of danger. She observed how the vocals sang, growled and pushed to the point of almost yelling to get the "raspy, rough, and powerful" aspects of Dice across, sharing Schuelke's comparison to the music of Louis Armstrong. Because Armstrong was often depicted as a savage or minstrel archetype in film, Scoggin saw this as reflecting both the urbane and savage aspects of King Dice through Calloway and Armstrong respectively. However, while she echoed Cole's commentary about the racial overtones of the game, she felt players in a modern audience may not necessarily make that correlation, and other aspects of how the characters were depicted may have been seen as a more nuanced view of race by 1930s audiences.

The character's portrayal in the Cuphead Show was praised, with Steven Petite of GameSpot describing Wayne Brady's portrayal of him as a "charismatic yet sleazy game show host" as accurate to the character. The Mary Sue's Briana Lawrence stated that while Dice was not the story's main antagonist, his "swagger was off the charts", citing his theme song. She felt Brady was perfect for the role, and enjoyed the character's mannerisms that conveyed his personality, describing it as everything she had imagined. Steven Scaife of Slant Magazine on the other hand saw the character's otherwise unchanged shift as a concession to downplay the racial overtones of gambling and racist depiction of black men, citing Cole's Unwinnable article, and saw it as a naïve concession at trying to obscure the "minstrel roots of Cuphead's primary influences".
