= The Cuphead Show! =

Animated slapstick comedy television series

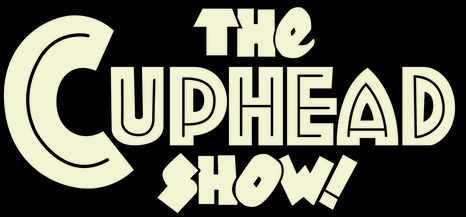
- Genre: Slapstick; Comedy; Musical; Adventure
- Based on: Cuphead and characters by Studio MDHR
- Developed by: Dave Wasson
- Written by: Deeki Deke; Clay Morrow; Adam Paloian; Cosmo Segurson; Dave Wasson
- Directed by: Clay Morrow; Adam Paloian
- Voices of: Tru Valentino; Frank Todaro; Grey DeLisle; Joe Hanna; Luke Millington-Drake; Wayne Brady; Cosmo Segurson; Dave Wasson
- Theme music composer: Ego Plum
- Opening theme: "Welcome to the Cuphead Show!" (performed by Gizzelle Andrea Becerra, Tru Valentino, and Frank Todaro)
- Ending theme: "Farewell to the Cuphead Show!" (instrumental composed by Ego Plum)
- Composer: Ego Plum
- Countries of origin: United States; Canada; Ireland
- Original language: English
- No. of seasons: 3
- No. of episodes: 36 (list of episodes)

Production
- Executive producers: Dave Wasson; CJ Kettler; Chad Moldenhauer; Jared Moldenhauer
- Producers: Carolyn Roach (line); Jackie Watson (line)
- Editor: Amy Blaisdell
- Running time: 10–34 minutes
- Production companies: Netflix Animation; Lighthouse Studios; King Features Syndicate; Studio MDHR

Original release
- Network: Netflix
- Release: February 18 – November 18, 2022

The Cuphead Show! is an animated slapstick comedy television series developed by Dave Wasson for Netflix based on the 2017 video game Cuphead by Studio MDHR. Chad and Jared Moldenhauer, the creators of Cuphead, serve as executive producers, along with Wasson and CJ Kettler from King Features Syndicate, and Cosmo Segurson serving as co-executive producer.

The show was released on February 18, 2022, as a Netflix Original Series. The second season of The Cuphead Show! was released on August 19, 2022, followed shortly after by the third season, which debuted on November 18, 2022. It received generally positive reviews from critics, who praised its animation, voice acting, music, humor, and tone. However, some felt it lacked substance, with the episodes' plots being criticized for being "too fragmented" and "often repetitive".

== Plot ==
Set in the 1930s-style world of the Inkwell Isles, The Cuphead Show! follows the misadventures of impulsive, troublemaking scamp Cuphead and cautious but easily-swayed Mugman, a pair of anthropomorphic cup brothers who live with their grandfather and elderly caretaker, Elder Kettle, in a teapot-shaped cottage. The brothers' stories often center around them trying to find their way out of various issues, occasionally meeting and interacting with characters from its video game source material. While the series is mainly episodic, one recurring plot is the Devil hunting Cuphead for his soul, as he believes it is rightfully his after Cuphead lost a soul-harvesting game called "Soul Ball", only to be always foiled by Cuphead and Mugman.

== Voice cast ==
- Tru Valentino as Cuphead
- Frank Todaro as Mugman
- Grey DeLisle as Ms. Chalice
- Joe Hanna as Elder Kettle
- Cosmo Segurson as Porkrind and Elephant
- Wayne Brady as King Dice
- Luke Millington-Drake as the Devil
- Dave Wasson as Henchman and Telephone
- Chris Wylde as Ribby
- Rick Zieff as Croaks
- Andrew Morgado as Stickler
- Keith Ferguson as Bowlboy
- Natasia Demetriou as Cala Maria
- Zoë Moss as Baroness Von Bon Bon
- Jason Vande Brake as Captain Brineybeard
- Chris Kattan as Werner Werman

== Episodes ==
| Season | Episodes | Originally released |
|---|---|---|
| 1 | 12 | February 18, 2022 |
| 2 | 13 | August 19, 2022 |
| 3 | 11 | November 18, 2022 |

== Production ==
=== Development ===
In July 2019, it was announced that Netflix had green-lit the series. Chad and Jared Moldenhauer from Studio MDHR are executive producers, along with C.J. Kettler from King Features Syndicate, Time Squad creator Dave Wasson, and co-executive produced by Cosmo Segurson. Clay Morrow and Adam Paloian are supervising directors. The series is animated by Lighthouse Studios, a Kilkenny-based division between Mercury Filmworks and Cartoon Saloon, and stop motion animation was provided by Screen Novelties. In an effort to meet streaming series deadlines, the show's production crew were unable to use hand-drawn animation like in the game, instead choosing to use puppet-based methods while also putting in various elements to match the 1930s rubber hose style. The series was first revealed at the Annecy International Animation Film Festival in June 2020, with the announcement that the show's music would be composed by Ego Plum.

== Release ==
The first season of The Cuphead Show! premiered on February 18, 2022, and consisted of twelve episodes. Netflix ordered a total of 36 episodes to be produced, that would end up getting released as three seasons. The second season was released on August 19, 2022, and featured thirteen episodes, with the third and eighth episodes running close to 25 minutes each. The third and final season was released on November 18, 2022, and consisted of eleven episodes. The first and final episodes were each 20 minutes long, while the sixth episode became the longest in the series, lasting 30 minutes.

== Reception ==
=== Viewership ===
Variety's Trending TV chart, which tracks social media engagement across trending television content, reported that The Cuphead Show! generated 109,000 engagements on Twitter from February 14–20, 2022, ranking No. 5 on the chart behind Succession. The series later garnered 103,600 engagements on Twitter from February 28 to March 6, placing No. 7 on the chart, behind Moon Knight. The Cuphead Show! was viewed for 14.6 million hours on Netflix during the week of February 14–20. The series later accumulated 20.85 million hours of viewing from February 21–27. Between February 13 and March 6, it spent three weeks in Netflix's global "Top 10" list—a daily ranking of the platform's most-watched titles—totaling 47.29 million hours of viewing time. The Cuphead Show! subsequently ranked ninth on Netflix's "Top 10" list on March 2. TVision, which tracks viewer attention, program reach, and engagement across more than 1,000 CTV apps, reported that the series had a 49% binge-watch rate in March 2022, indicating that nearly half of viewers watched three or more episodes in a single sitting. By August, this rate rose to 57%, placing The Cuphead Show! among the top binge-watched programs on Netflix that month. Globally, it ranked fourth among Netflix's Top 10 Most Popular Kids' Shows and Movies in 2022, following Paw Patrol, CoComelon, and Gabby's Dollhouse.

In the years following its initial release, The Cuphead Show! experienced renewed popularity. JustWatch, a guide to streaming content with access to data from more than 20 million users around the world, announced that The Cuphead Show! was the sixth most popular television adaptation of a video game as of April 19, 2023. It ranked ahead of other video game-based series, including Resident Evil, Dota: Dragon's Blood, Resident Evil: Infinite Darkness, and Carmen Sandiego. What We Watched: A Netflix Engagement Report, which details Netflix viewership from January to June 2023, the first season of The Cuphead Show! generated 14.5 million hours of viewing, while the second and third seasons each recorded 16.3 million hours. Market research company Parrot Analytics, which evaluates consumer engagement through research, streaming, downloads, and social media, reported that The Cuphead Show! saw substantial demand in February 2024. Its audience demand was 5.1 times higher than the average show in the United States, placing it within the top 8.6% of all TV shows. When comparing its year-over-year performance, the series reached a peak of 6.8 times the average demand, reflecting a significant 41.1% increase. On a global scale, the series demonstrated strong demand, particularly in markets such as Russia, China, and Brazil.

=== Critical response ===
On review aggregation website Rotten Tomatoes, 75% of 16 critics gave the first season a positive review, with an average rating of 7.1/10. The site's critical consensus is: "While The Cuphead Show! fluidly recreates its video game forebear's eye-popping animation, this good-looking vessel is still waiting for some substance to fill it." On Metacritic, it has a weighted average score of 69 based on reviews from 4 critics, indicating "generally favourable reviews".

Jesse Lab of The Escapist praised The Cuphead Show! for embracing its role as a children's animated series, focusing on its retro-inspired animation and episodic structure rather than attempting to mirror the game's more complex themes. He acknowledged that while the show may disappoint fans of the game with its simplistic, situational comedy and lack of narrative depth, it succeeds in being an entertaining and positive cartoon for younger audiences. Lab appreciated the humor and moral lessons embedded in each episode, emphasizing that the show's design, reminiscent of classic cartoons like Looney Tunes, makes it a charming, if not revolutionary, option for kids, rather than a hardcore gaming adaptation. Rafael Motamayor of IGN gave The Cuphead Show! a rating of 9 out of 10, complimenting it for effectively adapting the video game into a humorous and visually captivating animated series. He highlighted the show's fusion of 1930s animation styles with modern comedic timing, noting its surreal, slapstick humor and episodic nature. Motamayor also commended the characters, particularly the brotherly dynamic between Cuphead and Mugman, as well as the comedic charm of Elder Kettle. Despite some criticisms over the lack of serialization, he found The Cuphead Show! to be an entertaining, fun, and nostalgic experience that appeals to both animation fans and newcomers alike.

Following its release, The Cuphead Show! has been featured in multiple rankings of the best video game television adaptations.

=== Accolades ===
| Year | Award | Category | Nominee(s) | Result | Ref. |
|---|---|---|---|---|---|
| 2022 | The Game Awards | Best Adaptation | The Cuphead Show! | Nominated | |
| 2022 | Children's and Family Emmy Awards | Outstanding Animated Series | C.J. Kettler, Chad Moldenhauer, Jared Moldenhauer, Dave Wasson, Cosmo Segurson, Carolyn Roach and Jackie Watson | Nominated | |
| 2022 | Children's and Family Emmy Awards | Individual Achievement in Animation | Ivan Aguirre (background painter) | Won | |
| 2023 | Annie Awards | Outstanding Achievement for Music in an Animated Television / Broadcast Production | Ego Plum, Cosmo Segurson and Dave Wasson ("Carn-Evil") | Won | |
| 2023 | Annie Awards | Outstanding Achievement for Storyboarding in an Animated Television / Broadcast Production | Karl Hadrika ("A Very Devil Christmas") | Nominated | |
| 2023 | Children's and Family Emmy Awards | Outstanding Original Song for a Children's or Young Teen Program | Ego Plum and Dave Wasson ("Down & Out: Roll the Dice") | Nominated | |
| 2023 | Children's and Family Emmy Awards | Outstanding Directing for an Animated Program | Clayton Morrow and Adam Paloian | Won | |

=== Impact ===
The release of The Cuphead Show! led to an increase in sales of the Cuphead game, according to its creators, the Moldenhauer brothers. Following the show's debut on Netflix, interest in the game was renewed, resulting in higher sales even before the release of its downloadable content. Chad Moldenhauer noted that while the increase was noticeable, it was not an extraordinary surge, but rather a consistent uptick, with some players returning to tackle additional challenges. In June 2024, fans launched the "#RenewTheCupheadShow" social media campaign to advocate for the series' return.

== In other media ==
- In February 2022, Random House Children's Books announced a series of books, which included Screen Comix, Step into Reading, and Little Golden Books. The first releases, a Screen Comix book titled Handle With Care and a Step into Reading book titled Welcome to the Inkwell Isles, were published on May 3, 2022.
- In November 2022, Dark Horse Books announced The Art of The Cuphead Show!, a hardcover book exploring the creation of the television series. The book features contributions from the series’ producers, writers, graphic artists, and others, providing an in-depth look at the development and production of the show. It includes never-before-seen production art, character designs, and additional materials. The Art of The Cuphead Show! was initially scheduled for release in bookstores on June 27, 2023, and in comic stores on June 28. However, it was ultimately released on September 3, 2023.

== Future ==
In July 2025, The Cuphead Show! writer Deeki Deke expressed interest in a potential crossover with Hazbin Hotel, imagining the video game characters encountering the daughter of Lucifer Morningstar, Charlie Morningstar. Deke stated, "I would like to do an older-skewing crossover of Cuphead and Hazbin Hotel. This would ignite a holy war between the fandoms, but then, holy wars are embedded in both shows' backstories."
