= Enchanted Portals =

2023 run and gun video game

- Developer: Xixo Games Studio
- Publisher: Xixo Games Studio (Note: Console versions published by Perp Games)
- Engine: Unreal Engine 4
- Platforms: Windows; PlayStation 5; Xbox Series X/S; Nintendo Switch; PlayStation 4; Xbox One
- Release: September 6, 2023: Windows; September 6, 2023; PlayStation 5, Xbox Series X/S; September 8, 2023; PlayStation 4, Xbox One, Nintendo Switch; November 1, 2023
- Genre: Run and gun
- Modes: Single-player, multiplayer

Enchanted Portals is a platform video game developed and published by Xixo Games Studio. It was released on September 5, 2023, for Microsoft Windows, September 8, 2023, for PlayStation 5 and Xbox Series X/S, and November 1 for PlayStation 4, Xbox One, and Nintendo Switch. The game drew comparisons to the 2017 platformer Cuphead, with whom it shares its gameplay and visual style. It received largely negative reviews.

== Gameplay ==
Enchanted Portals is a 2D platformer in which players take the role of Bobby and Penny, rookie wizards stuck between dimensions after an accident involving a magic book. The game can be played either alone or cooperatively. Enchanted Portals consists of platforming stages broken up by boss fights, with players being able to utilise various magical power-ups to help them overcome challenges. These power-ups include three kinds of spell attacks, a protective bubble to block an attack, and the ability to swipe at certain obstacles with the playable character's wand. Some boss levels also add certain changes in the gameplay or setting.

== Plot ==
While Bobby and Penny are doing housework, the former accidentally knocks a book off of a shelf. When the two look at it, they see instructions for creating a portal and follow the steps to make one. However, the portal that Bobby and Penny create ends up sucking the two inside of it, along with their pet cat and the magic book, which soon becomes alive.

Bobby and Penny explore a variety of different worlds, including a spooky forest with a haunted hotel, a spaceship piloted by a cyborg cow, an island with an ancient temple, a castle with frogs, and a town populated by roosters. While making it through all of these dimensions, they fight the worlds' hostile inhabitants and look for the sentient magic book.

After making it through every world, Bobby and Penny end up in a wormhole, where the magic book tries to kill the two with his spells. After Bobby and Penny finally defeat the magic book in battle, they return home right when an older wizard (presumably their caretaker) arrives. Later, the magic book tells another book (most likely his father) about what Bobby and Penny did to him, hinting at a potential sequel in which the latter book may seek retribution against the two wizards.

== Development and release ==
In October 2019, Xixo Games Studio, a Spanish two-person development team, announced that they were planning to fund Enchanted Portals via a Kickstarter campaign. After a delay due to negotiations with a prospective publisher, the campaign was launched in 2020. The Kickstarter failed to meet its €120,000 goal.

Enchanted Portals was released on September 6, 2023, for Windows. It was later released for PlayStation 5 and Xbox Series X and S on September 8. A physical release of the PlayStation 5 version referred to as the Tales Edition was released on September 29. The game was released on the Nintendo Switch in Europe on October 23, and in North America on November 1.

== Reception ==
Reception

Aggregate scores
Aggregator	Score
Metacritic	PS5: 42/100
OpenCritic	14% recommend

Review scores
Publication	Score
Gamereactor	4/10
PlayStation Universe	2.5/10

A trailer for the game was released on YouTube and Twitter on October 8, 2019. Viewers negatively compared the game to its inspiration, Cuphead.

Upon release, Enchanted Portals received a number of negative reviews, with review aggregator Metacritic summarising the critical reception of the PlayStation 5 version as "generally unfavorable". On OpenCritic, the reception from top critics is "weak", with less than 20% of the general critics recommending it.

Reviewing Enchanted Portals for Gamereactor, Conny Andersson wrote that the game "feels so very Cuphead that it almost borders on plagiarism", noting similarities in both the art style and a high level of difficulty. Andersson offered praise to the boss battles and soundtrack while criticising the "dull" level design, as well as finding it tedious to switch weapons due to this requiring the player character to be stationary. Much like Andersson, Kyle LeClair of Hardcore Gamer viewed the level design as dull, summarising the game as "an absolute mess, plain and simple", though he offered praise toward the character designs, "attractive and colorful" graphics, and "a couple of neat bosses".
