= Cuphead (character) =

Video game character

- Cuphead character
- Cuphead as seen in Cuphead (2017)
- First game: Cuphead (2017)
- Created by: Chad Moldenhauer
- Voiced by: Tru Valentino (The Cuphead Show!)

In-universe information
- Family: Mugman (brother); Elder Kettle (caretaker)

Cuphead is the title character of the 2017 video game Cuphead, created by developers Chad and Jared Moldenhauer. After losing their souls in a game of craps against the Devil at his casino, Cuphead and his brother Mugman strike a deal wherein they are tasked with collecting on debts owed by the residents of their home, Inkwell Isle; should they return to the Devil with each debt, they may be spared.

Cuphead has been generally positively received, with one critic comparing him and his brother to Mario and Luigi. Cuphead would go on to make appearances in other games, including Super Smash Bros. Ultimate.

== Conception and characteristics ==
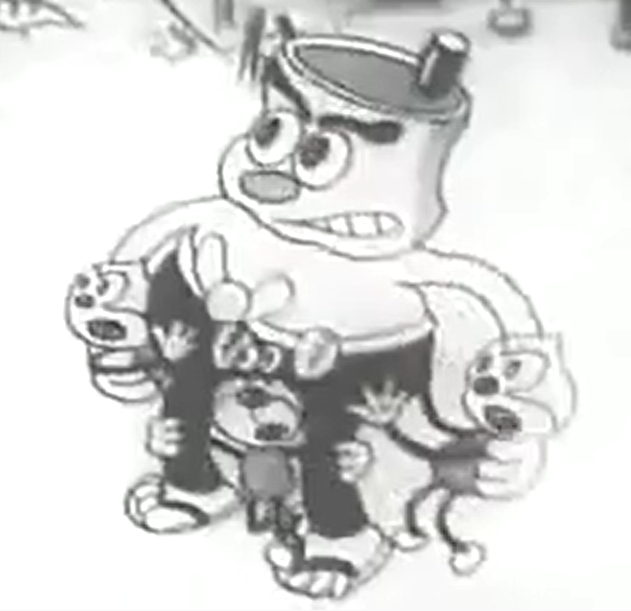
Cuphead is inspired by Mickey Mouse and this character from a 1936 propaganda short film called Evil Mickey Attacks Japan.

According to Jared Moldenhauer, in the early stages of Cuphead's development, Studio MDHR needed a main character to replace the “little weird green guy” with a hat they been using as a placeholder. The team brainstormed lots of 1930's-themed concepts while his brother Chad Moldenhauer started paying attention to the backgrounds in the old cartoons, instead of the characters. Moldenhauer also designed few concept sketches of the character which started with simple ideas based on people and animals, but soon realized that these designs were common in classic animation works. Chad and Jared Moldenhauer began designing the character's head look like a light bulb, a cactus and a fishbowl, as well as existing characters from retro video games and old cartoons as inspiration. Chad elaborated during the brainstorming process, jested to draw something like an anvil for a head. However, the two couldn't remember the exact object of inspiration. Chad randomly tried drawing a character with a cup as its head and Jared found the design was "a lot skinnier and spindlier." Once he and Jared Moldenhauer came up with the character, they knew that they had something special.

Cuphead's gloves are coloured white, while sometimes they were yellow due to the inspiration of characters from the golden age of American animation, such as Mickey Mouse also having his gloves sometimes white and yellow, according to TheGamer writer Sean Murray. Tru Valentino got the audition from his agent to voiced Cuphead for The Cuphead Show. Since the character doesn't speak in the original game, in an interview with Valentino alongside with Frank Todaro and CBR writer Sam Stone, who asked the two if they had the benefit of having a relatively blank canvas. However, Valentino said that it had to be an East Coast kind of vibe.

== Appearances ==
Cuphead first appeared in the 2017 video game Cuphead as the main protagonist and player character. In the game, he and his brother Mugman lose a game of dice against the Devil and have to save their own souls by collecting soul contracts from bosses. By the end of the game, the two manage to complete their goals by defeating all of the bosses and their soul contacts. In Super Smash Bros. Ultimate, Cuphead appeared as a costume for the playable Mii Gunner character which was released as downloadable content on January 28, 2020. He also appeared in 2020 video game Fall Guys as one of the player's costumes. Cuphead has appeared in the animated television series The Cuphead Show. In 2026, Cuphead was confirmed to appear in a spin-off game entitled Mighty Cuphead Adventure as well as an official untitled sequel to the original 2017 game.

== Reception ==
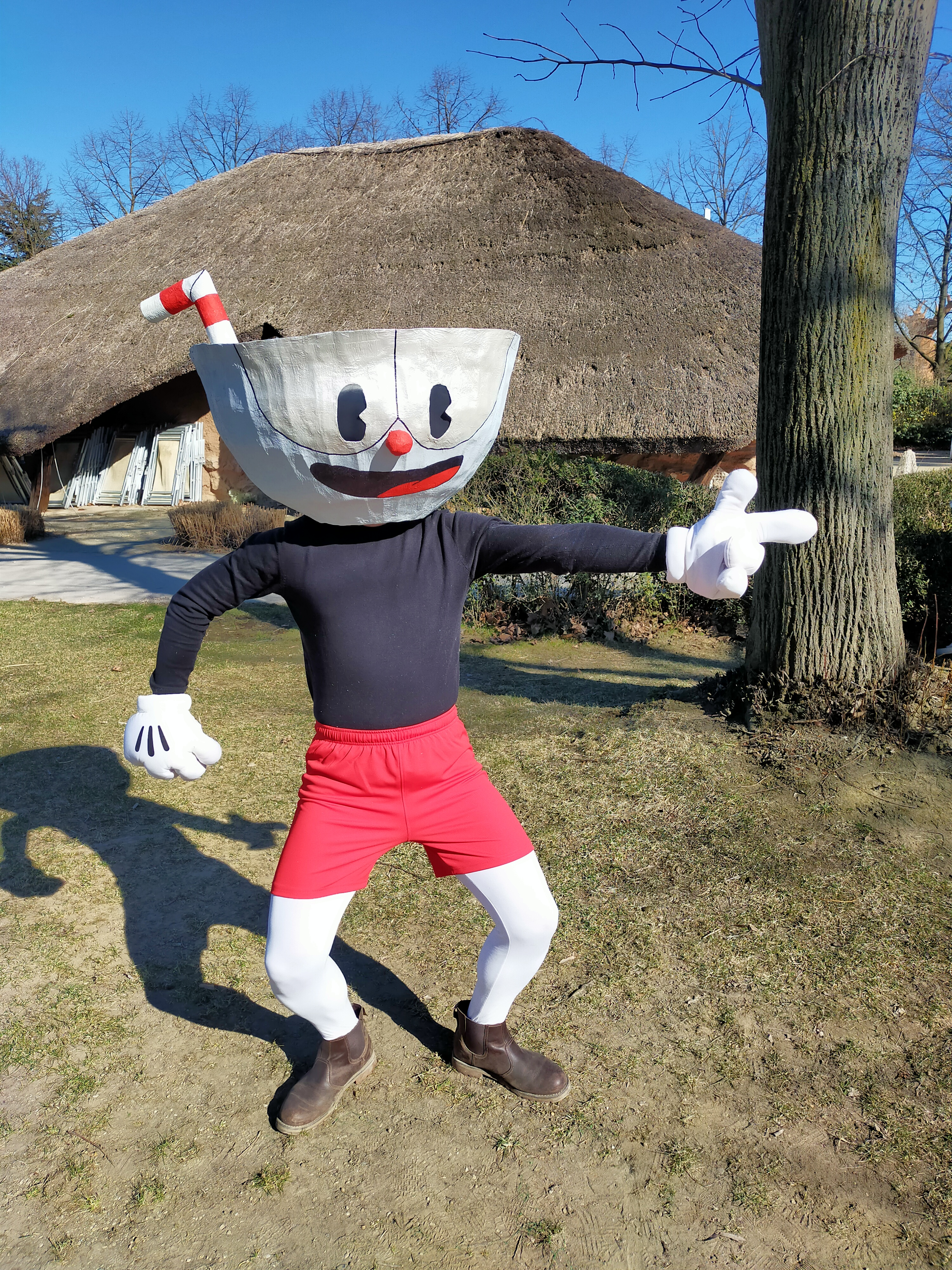
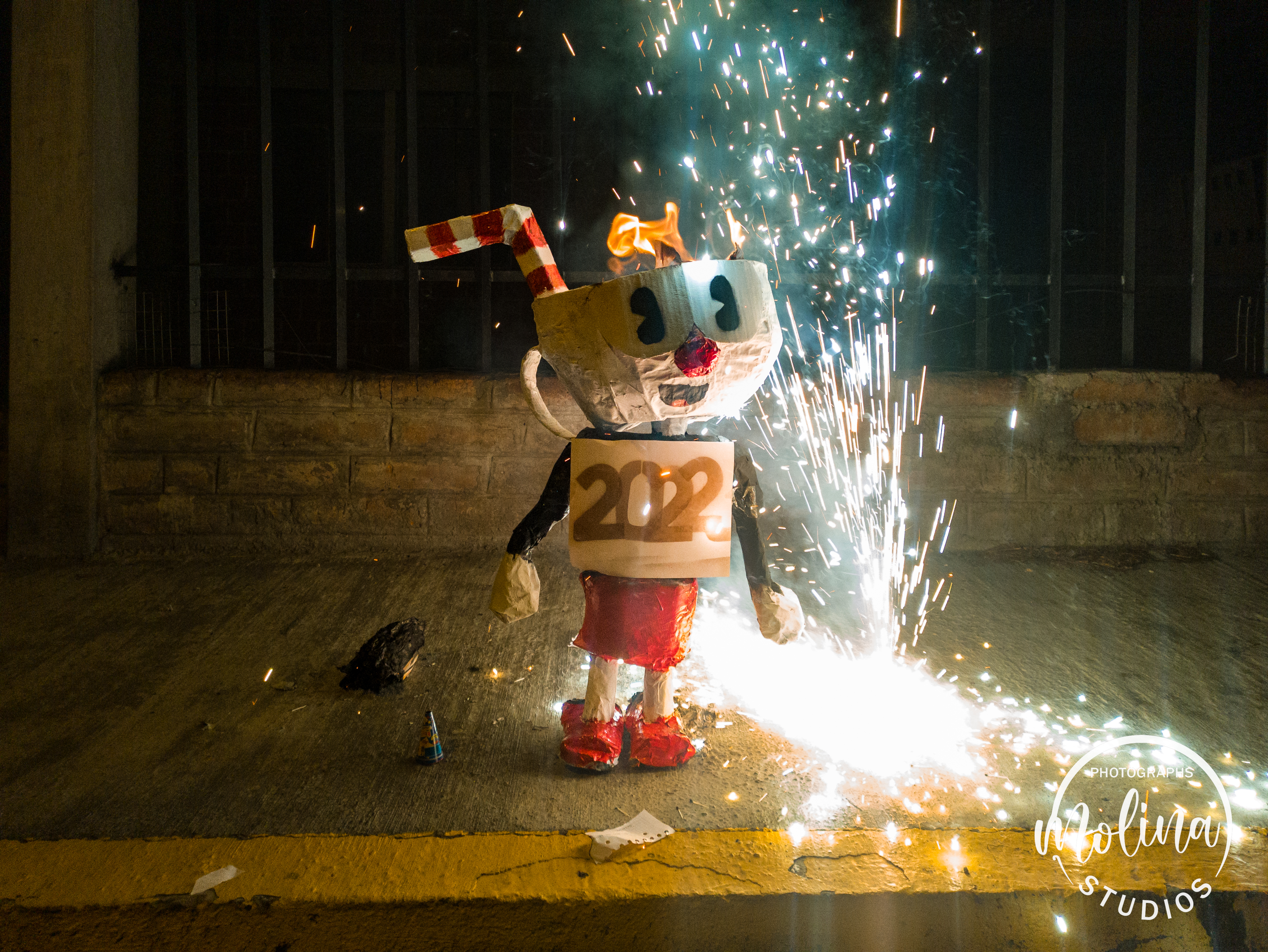
A cosplay of Cuphead and a firedoll of Cuphead in the quema de año viejo in Ecuador in 2022

Cuphead has received generally positive reception, with Nintendo Life writer Jim Norman noting like other video game characters, Cuphead was immortalised into a Nendoroid figure. Screen Rant writer Kayla Singleton described Cuphead as "playful riffraff" and noticed that his sense of right and wrong is a "bit blurry" to him. Despite of his reckless action, he will do anything to protect his family. Cuphead alongside with Mugman has share a lot in common with Mario and Luigi from the Mario franchise according to Game Rant writer Carlos Zotomayor from both of them are brothers, their behaviors, aesthetics, gameplay, and lore significance. He wrote on the article that Cuphead's influence of Mario and Luigi helped make him stand out from other video game protagonists.

Game Informer writer Ben Hanson wrote that the game's co-creator Jared Moldenhauer jested in an interview with Nintendo's manager Kirk Scott about how badly he wanted to see Cuphead and Mugman in Super Smash Bros. Ultimate. Moldenhauer has dreamed of the game and acknowledged that "[Cuphead and Mugman] belong in there. So basically if fans want it, He couldn't see how Nintendo wouldn't want the fans to get what they wanted." Scott asked Moldenhauer of which characters would most likely to go against Cuphead in the game and he answered Ice Climbers.
