= Tru Valentino =

American actor

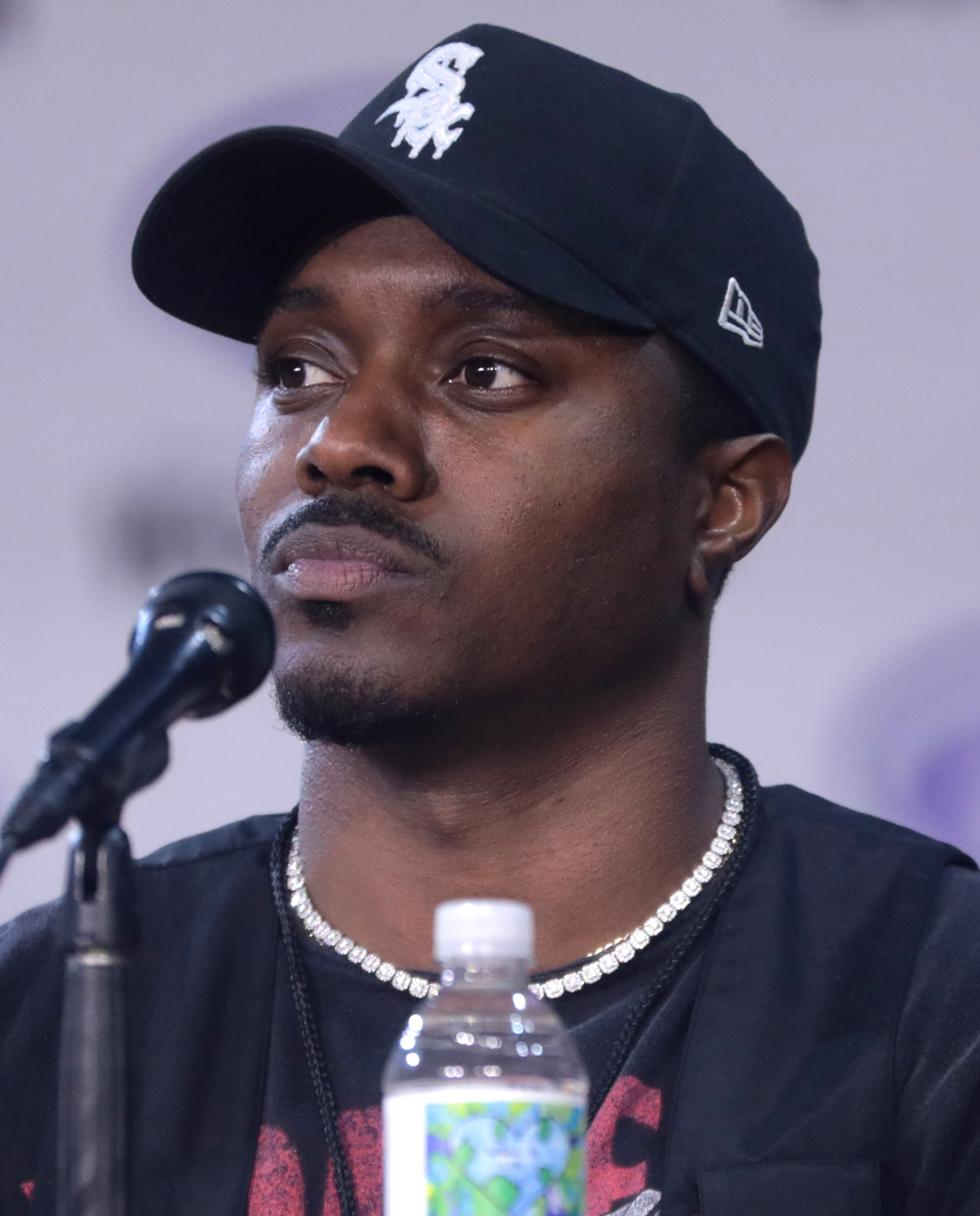
- Valentino at the 2023 WonderCon in Anaheim, California
- Born: Truman Valentino; Frankfurt, West Germany
- Occupation: Actor
- Years active: 2016–present

Truman "Tru" Valentino is an American actor. He is known for playing Aaron Thorsen in The Rookie (2021–2024; 2026), and Cuphead in The Cuphead Show! (2022).

== Early life ==
Tru Valentino was born in Frankfurt, West Germany. Years later his family would move to Waynesville, Missouri, in the United States, where he graduated from Waynesville High School.

== Career ==
He is a member of the Sunday Company at the Groundlings Theatre and School of Los Angeles, and has been featured as a guest in many of their spectacles, including the improvisation show Cookin' with Gas and the sketch live-show Sunday Night Fever. Valentino joined the fourth season of the ABC series, The Rookie, in a recurring role. In July 2022, he became a series regular starting in the show's fifth season. In August 2024, Valentino confirmed that he would not be in the seventh season and was leaving the show. In 2023, he voiced Cyborg in the direct-to-video film Justice League x RWBY: Super Heroes & Huntsmen.

== Filmography ==
=== Film ===
Year	Title	Role	Notes
2021	The Loud House Movie	Fish Shoppe Owner (voice)	Netflix original film
2022	Beavis and Butt-Head Do the Universe	McCabe, Head Corrections Officer (voice)	Paramount+ exclusive film
2023	Justice League x RWBY: Super Heroes & Huntsmen	Cyborg, Kilg%re (voice)	Direct-to-video

=== Television ===
Year	Title	Role	Notes
2019	Hot Streets	Jon, Tony (voice)	Episode: "Hot Streets Disease"
2019, 2021	Archibald's Next Big Thing	Chip, Shane (voice)	2 episodes
2019–2021	Fast & Furious: Spy Racers	Gary, Julius, Scadan, Williams (voice)	41 episodes
2020–2021	Trolls: TrollsTopia	Blaze Powerchord (voice)	3 episodes
2020–2021	The Casagrandes	Blaze (voice)	2 episodes
2020–2022	Madagascar: A Little Wild	Various voices	26 episodes
2020–2022	The Mighty Ones	Dave, Carder, additional voices	15 episodes
2021	Ridley Jones	Visitor Dad (voice)	Episode: "Ready or Not, Here I Come/Some Like It Hot"
2021–2026	The Rookie	Aaron Thorsen	Main role (seasons 5–6); Recurring role (season 4); Guest (season 8); 45 episodes
2021–present	Spidey and His Amazing Friends	T'Challa / Black Panther, additional voices	18 episodes
2022	FreakAngels	Jack (voice)	Miniseries
2022	We Baby Bears	Various voices	3 episodes
2022	The Cuphead Show!	Cuphead, additional voices	Main role, 36 episodes
2022–2023	Kung Fu Panda: The Dragon Knight	Various voices	5 episodes
2022–2023	Beavis and Butt-Head	Various voices	9 episodes
2022–2023	The Croods: Family Tree	Hwan (voice)	3 episodes
2023	The Boss Baby: Back in the Crib	Bobber the Cub, Floaties Security Baby (voice)	Episode: "Floaties"
2024–2025	Trolls: Fun Fair Surprise	Tiny Diamond	Main role, 10 episodes
2024–2025	Mighty MonsterWheelies	Bolts Frankenstein, Wyacht	Main role
2025	StuGo	Zarconium, Doorbell (voice)	Episode: "Pea-Brained Mutant Crystal Nuptials"
2026	Life, Larry and the Pursuit of Unhappiness	Ottoman	Episode: "McCarthy"

=== Video games ===
Year	Title	Role	Notes
2020	Rocket Arena	Gant	Voice
2021	Psychonauts 2	Adam	
2021	Fast & Furious Spy Racers: Rise of SH1FT3R	Scadan	
2023	Trolls: Remix Rescue	Tiny Diamond	Voice
