= Cuphead =

2017 video game

- Promotional artwork with Cuphead (left) and Mugman (right)
- Developer: Studio MDHR
- Publisher: Studio MDHR
- Directors: Chad Moldenhauer; Jared Moldenhauer
- Producers: Marija Moldenhauer; Ryan Moldenhauer
- Designer: Jared Moldenhauer
- Programmers: Tony Coculuzzi; Eric Billingsley; Kezia Adamo; Thomas Pryde
- Artists: Chad Moldenhauer; Marija Moldenhauer
- Writer: Evan Skolnick
- Composer: Kristofer Maddigan
- Engine: Unity
- Platforms: Windows; Xbox One; macOS; Nintendo Switch; PlayStation 4
- Release: Windows, Xbox One; WW: September 29, 2017; macOS; WW: October 19, 2018; Nintendo Switch; WW: April 18, 2019; PlayStation 4; WW: July 28, 2020
- Genre: Run and gun
- Modes: Single-player, multiplayer

Cuphead is a 2017 run and gun game developed and published independently by Studio MDHR. The game follows its titular cup-head character and his brother Mugman, as they make a deal with the Devil to pay casino losses by repossessing the souls of runaway debtors. In the game, up to two players control Cuphead or Mugman to fight through several levels and boss fights; the game does not have a rigid narrative structure. As the game progresses, the protagonist acquires more power and abilities, eventually facing the Devil. Players, however, can only equip a limited number of these abilities at a given time.

The game's creators, brothers Chad and Jared Moldenhauer, took inspiration from the rubber hose animation style from the golden age of American animation and the surrealist qualities of the works of Walt Disney Animation Studios, Fleischer Studios, Warner Bros. Cartoons, MGM Cartoon Studio and Walter Lantz Productions. Reminiscent of the aesthetics of the 1930s and the Jazz Age, the game is noted for its animation and soundtrack. All in-game assets were created through traditional animation with deliberate human imperfections, and the soundtrack was written for and recorded with a full big band.

Cuphead was announced in 2013, had a preview at E3 2014 and was released in 2017 as a timed exclusive for Microsoft's Windows and Xbox One, plus later ports to other systems. The game was a commercial success, selling 2 million copies within 2 weeks of release and 6 million in 2 years. Cuphead received universal acclaim for its art style, gameplay, soundtrack, and difficulty. Multiple outlets extolled it as one of the best video game soundtracks of all time, one of the hardest video games ever made, and one of the best games of 2017. Its many awards include a trio of Game Awards and D.I.C.E. Awards, as well as a British Academy Games Award. A DLC expansion, Cuphead: The Delicious Last Course, was released on June 30, 2022. An animated series adaptation, The Cuphead Show!, premiered in February 2022 on Netflix. An untitled sequel to the video game, as well as a spin-off, Mighty Cuphead Adventure, were announced in June 2026.

== Gameplay ==
The player, as Cuphead, fighting Captain Brineybeard. The art style is heavily based on rubber hose animation.

Cuphead's gameplay is centred on continual boss fights, interspersed with run and gun levels. Each is housed in one of four worlds, with the final fight against the Devil (has 3 phases). Each boss fight includes simple, regular, and expert difficulty modes (except for the final two bosses, which lack a simple mode). Defeating a boss on regular mode is required to progress through the game and unlocks expert mode for that particular level. Most boss battles take place on land, although some involve player characters piloting aeroplanes and play like a side-scrolling shoot 'em up. The game includes role-playing elements and a branching level sequence. Player characters have infinite lives, maintaining all equipment between deaths.

Equippable weapons and special abilities, referred to as Charms, can be purchased from Porkrind's Emporium, an in-game shop, using coins found in levels and the overworld. Player characters can use a slapping parry attack on objects marked in pink to various effects, the most important of them being a super meter charge that enables more powerful attacks. The super meter is represented by a row of five playing cards, and can also be charged through attacking or Charm effects. An enhanced attack can be executed at the cost of one card, with its particular form determined by the currently equipped weapon. The most powerful strikes, or Super Arts, require the Super Meter to be fully charged and will completely drain it upon use. Three Super Arts are available, one in each of the first three worlds; to earn each one, the player must enter a mausoleum and parry a horde of ghosts to stop them from reaching an urn at the centre of the screen.

After completing a level, the players are ranked with a grade based on performance, determined by the time taken to complete the level, hit points left post-battle, number of parried attacks, and the number of times part of the super meter was used, in addition to the level difficulty. The levels are accessible through a top-down overworld perspective, each with its own secret areas.

The game has a two-player local cooperative mode, in which either player character can return to the game after being killed if the one parries the other's soul before it rises off the screen. Cuphead's brother, Mugman, serves as an alternative skin and a potential co-op partner in the game. The DLC expansion, The Delicious Last Course, adds a new area with its own campaign, including new bosses, weapons and Charms; a third playable character is also added, Ms. Chalice, who replaces either Cuphead or Mugman when equipped with the Astral Cookie Charm. Ms. Chalice has her own unique set of moves, including a double jump, an invincible roll maneuver, and a parry dash.

== Plot ==
On Inkwell Isle, the game follows Cuphead and Mugman, two fun-loving brothers who live under the watchful eye of Elder Kettle. Against his warnings, the brothers wander off to the Devil's Casino and begin playing craps. When they go on a winning streak, the Devil appears and makes a deal, offering to give them all the money in the casino if they win the next roll and threatening to take their souls if they lose. Cuphead accepts the offer but loses by rolling snake eyes. As he and Mugman beg for mercy, the Devil offers them another deal – if the brothers can collect the "soul contracts" from his runaway debtors by midnight the next day, the Devil might spare them. After returning home and informing Elder Kettle of their predicament, he gives the brothers a potion that allows them to fire blasts of energy from their fingers and warns them that the debtors may not willingly turn in their soul contracts.

The brothers travel across Inkwell Isle, fighting the debtors to obtain their contracts. As they enter the second sector of the island, Elder Kettle notices that the duo is getting stronger from their battles and urges them to make the right choice when they meet the Devil. After Cuphead and Mugman enter the third sector, King Dice, the Devil's right-hand man, reports the brothers' progress to his boss and says he is suspicious of their intentions. The Devil replies that if the brothers were to try anything, he would be ready for them.

The brothers eventually collect all of the soul contracts and return to the Devil's Casino. King Dice stops them, saying that their success has caused him to lose a bet. In retaliation, he sets up an extended casino-style battle in an attempt to exact revenge. After defeating King Dice, the brothers confront the Devil, who tries to tempt them by inviting them to join him if they turn over the soul contracts. If the player chooses to do so, Cuphead and Mugman are transformed into the Devil's demonic lackeys, and the game ends. If they refuse, the Devil becomes furious with the brothers for failing to uphold their end of the bargain and battles them. Cuphead and Mugman defeat the Devil, incinerate the contracts, and return home. Learning that they have nothing to fear from the Devil anymore, the former debtors honour the brothers for their heroism as everyone celebrates.

=== The Delicious Last Course ===
After freeing a spirit known as the Legendary Chalice from one of the main game's mausoleums, Cuphead and Mugman receive a summons from her to visit the distant DLC Island. Once they arrive, Chalice demonstrates an "Astral Cookie" which allows her to trade places with the brother who eats it, turning him into a spirit and temporarily bringing her back to life in a youthful form. The cookie's inventor, Chef Saltbaker, unveils his recipe for a special dessert called the Wondertart, which can give Chalice a permanent body. Saltbaker notes that several antagonistic inhabitants on the island possess the required ingredients, and the brothers set out to collect them with Chalice's help.

Once the trio returns to the bakery with the ingredients, they find Saltbaker in its cellar. He reveals that the Wondertart requires a living soul baked into it to work and that he has kidnapped a member of the trio in their spiritual form, who may be any character not in play upon reaching the bakery, with the intention of using the Wondertart himself to conquer the astral plane. The remaining two engage Saltbaker in battle and defeat him, leading to the bakery's destruction and preventing the Wondertart's creation. Unwilling to let anyone else give up their soul for her benefit, Ms. Chalice decides to remain in her spiritual form until she can find a non-sacrificial way to revive herself while offering to continue helping Cuphead and Mugman when needed via the Astral Cookie.

In an epilogue, Saltbaker is arrested for his crimes and sentenced to a form of community service that involves assisting the inhabitants of DLC Island with their various problems. Saltbaker changes his ways as his sentence nears its end, rebuilds his bakery once it is served, and prepares pastries for everyone, including Cuphead, Mugman, and Chalice, the latter of whom is implied to have found a way to return to life permanently as an apology.

== Development ==
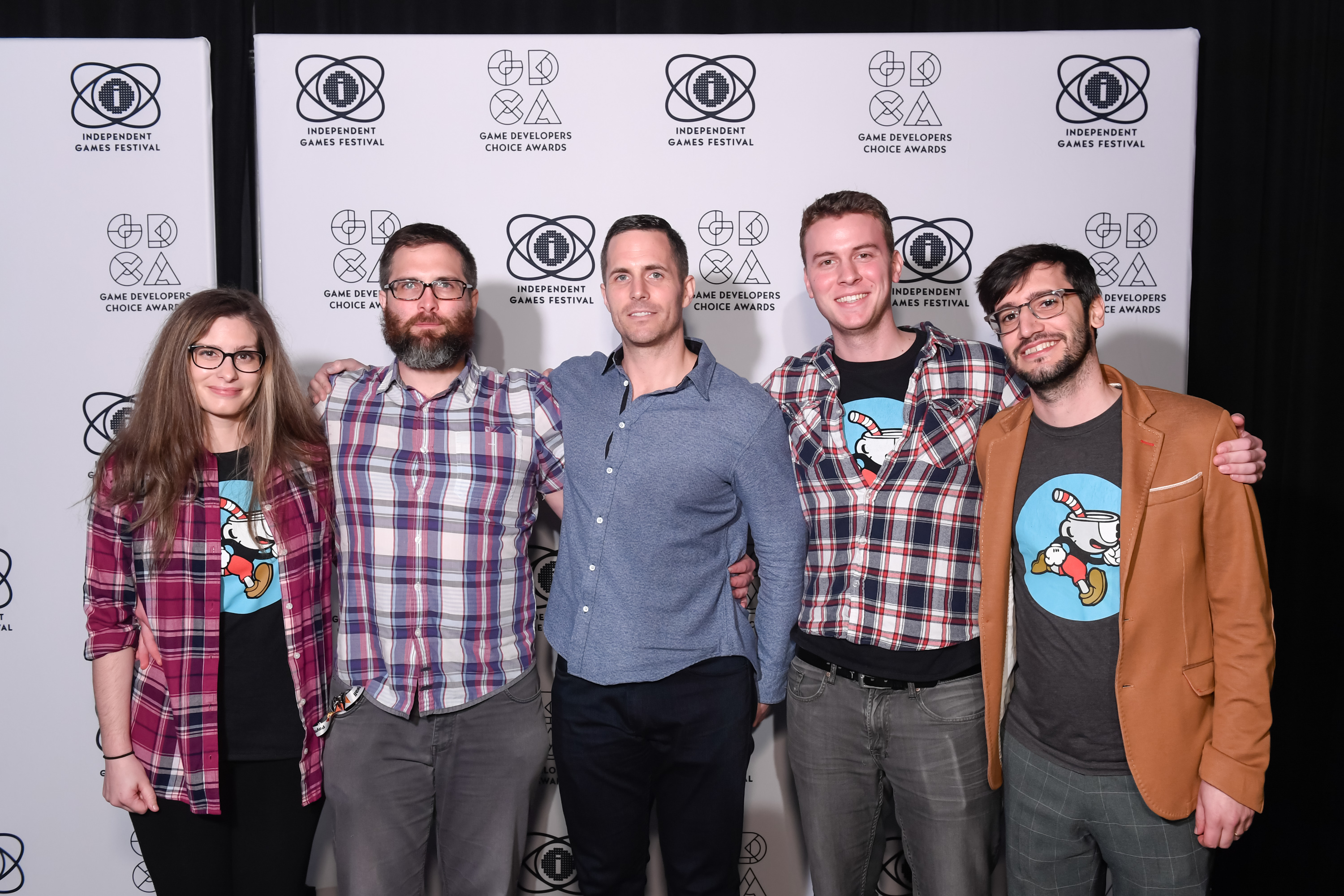
Cuphead developers Danielle Johnson, Jared and Chad Moldenhauer, Jake Clark, and Hanna Abi-Hanna were at the 2018 Game Developers Conference.

Cuphead is a game by Studio MDHR, a Canadian indie game development studio founded by brothers Chad and Jared Moldenhauer. The game was written by Evan Skolnick; additional animation work was contributed by Jake Clark, with programming led by Tony Coculuzzi. Its development began in 2010 using the Microsoft XNA, later switching to the Unity game engine in 2014, and it was developed from the brothers' homes in Oakville, Ontario and Regina, Saskatchewan, respectively. It was inspired by cartoons from the early days of the golden age of American animation such as those from Disney and Fleischer Studios, along with cartoonists Ub Iwerks, Grim Natwick and Willard Bowsky. Chad Moldenhauer called Fleischer Studios "the magnetic north of his art style", and particularly sought to mimic their "subversive and surrealist" elements.

The Moldenhauers watched many early golden-age cartoons in their youth, largely from VHS compilations their parents supplied. Among other siblings in their Regina, Saskatchewan childhood home, the duo shared an interest in video games. They attempted a game in the style of Cuphead in 2000 but lacked the tools to continue. The brothers decided to try again after the success of the indie game Super Meat Boy, released in 2010. The character that became Cuphead descended from a 1936 Japanese propaganda animated film featuring a character with a teacup for a head. The Moldenhauers emulated the animation because they found it strange, and "right away it stuck". Before settling on him as the main character, the brothers had created many different character designs, including a kappa wearing a top hat and characters with a plate or fork for a head.

Their animation techniques are similar to those of these cartoons. Chad Moldenhauer, who had previously worked in graphic design, hand-drew the animations and painted the backgrounds using watercolours, colourizing them in Photoshop. The gameplay's frame rate is sixty frames per second, while the animation runs at 24 per second, which is the standard in American film. Chad Moldenhauer saw the deliberately included human imperfections of their art design as a reaction to the perfectionism of modern pixel art. Jared Moldenhauer worked on other aspects of the game, and they discussed gameplay design together. Their studio hired a Romanian developer, a Brooklyn animator, and an Ontario jazz musician for the project. They sought to use recording processes vintage to that era. The score was composed by Kristofer Maddigan and consists of fifty-one tracks performed by jazz and big band musicians.

The Moldenhauers described Cuphead as having a difficultly "retro game" core for its emphasis on gameplay over plot. Kill Screen described the developers as "obsessed" with run-and-gun fundamentals of "animations and exploits and hitboxes". They made multiple revisions to many gameplay elements, including how gameplay actions feel at the edges of platforms and how long players are disabled after receiving damage. They planned multiple difficulty levels and chose to abandon a typical damsel in distress plot for one where Cuphead perpetually creates trouble for himself. The developers planned to surpass the Guinness World Record for number of boss battles in a run-and-gun game by having more than 30, compared to the record's 25 in Alien Soldier. The game's implementation and visual design, combined with the limited number of staff, was Studio MDHR's biggest challenge; to finance and complete development, the Moldenhauers remortgaged their house.

== Release ==
Though the game was shown during the Xbox press event of Electronic Entertainment Expo 2014 to audience approval, it was not available to play and was estimated to be 40 percent complete. It was expected to be extended via expansion packs with 10 to 15 bosses each, similar to how Sonic & Knuckles added atop the Sonic series. Cuphead was released on September 29, 2017, for Windows and Xbox One, and it supports Xbox Play Anywhere. King Features Syndicate has the licensing rights to merchandise and assorted paraphernalia.

The Delicious Last Course is downloadable content adding a new island, boss encounters, and a third playable character (Ms. Chalice), and was revealed at E3 2018 for release in 2019. However, the new content was pushed back into 2020 to avoid putting too much pressure and crunch time on the development team. It was further delayed due to the COVID-19 pandemic and was eventually released on June 30, 2022.

A port of Cuphead for macOS was released on October 19, 2018, and advertised with an animated short titled Crisp Apples.

A port for the Nintendo Switch was released on April 18, 2019. This was made possible when Microsoft approached the development team about it. A PlayStation 4 port was released on July 28, 2020.

In June 2019, Tesla CEO Elon Musk announced a port for the company's Linux-based operating system on select car models, expressing his appreciation for the game. It was released in September 2019 as part of Tesla's software version 10, though only the first level was playable.

== Reception ==
Reception

Aggregate scores
Aggregator	Score
Metacritic	PC: 88/100; XONE: 86/100; NS: 87/100; PS4: 86/100
OpenCritic	91% recommend

Review scores
Publication	Score
Destructoid	9.5/10
Edge	8/10
Electronic Gaming Monthly	9.5/10
Game Informer	8/10
GameSpot	8/10
GamesRadar+	5/5
Giant Bomb	5/5
IGN	8.8/10
PC Gamer (US)	86/100
Polygon	8.5/10
VideoGamer.com	8/10

The Delicious Last Course

Aggregate scores
Aggregator	Score
Metacritic	PC: 89/100; PS4: 86/100; XONE: 92/100; NS: 88/100
OpenCritic	99% recommend

Review scores
Publication	Score
Destructoid	9/10
Game Informer	8.8/10
GameSpot	9/10
Hardcore Gamer	4/5
IGN	9/10
Nintendo Life	9/10
NME	4/5
PC Gamer (US)	78/100
PCMag	4/5
Push Square	8
The Guardian	5/5

Ben Kuchera of Polygon wrote that Cuphead was one of the five most interesting reveals at Microsoft's E3 2014 press conference, even though he knew little about the game apart from its aesthetic. He said it "stood out immediately" and that everyone in the website's press room viscerally reacted to the trailer. Cuphead won the IGN Best Xbox One game at E3 award in 2015, and "Best Indie Game" at the Gamescom 2015 Awards. It was nominated as "Best Independent Game" at the E3 2016 Game Critics Awards.

Cuphead received "generally favorable" reviews, according to review aggregator website Metacritic. Its difficulty was noted by several media outlets. Destructoid's Brett Makedonski welcomed the high difficulty, which he noted as "tough but fair". Based on "exhaustive" pattern recognition, he said it ultimately relied on muscle memory, rather than reaction. He thought structuring the game around boss battles was well executed, and that each boss encounter held "different and special and memorable" traits. Praising the 1930s aesthetics as cohesive, he found the jazz-based soundtrack to be "similarly fabulous". He said the "eight-direction firing radius" was "clunky and awkward". Though dying 188 times in his playthrough, Ray Carsillo at EGMNow was not frustrated by the difficulty, but rather was motivated to "dig my heels in deeper". He lauded the "gorgeous" hand-drawn visuals, surpassed only by the gameplay, which goes "beyond pattern recognition". Peter Brown of GameSpot opined that combating enemies provided a considerably rewarding experience. He described the cartoon aesthetic as charming, infusing "color and expression" and a "true recreation" of hand-drawn cel animation. He relished the quick loading times, which support trial-and-error tactics. Though he saw "the fear of the unexpected" as part of Cuphead's thrill, he disparaged its failure to identify progress and capability.

Lucas Sullivan at GamesRadar+ wrote that Cuphead "stands tall among the best 2D shooters of all time", and that the gameplay demands patient pattern recognition, but which is not frustrating and would reward players "tenfold". Sullivan called the animation adorable, with a wealth of detail in the watercolour backdrops, which worked well with the gameplay. Giant Bomb's Ben Pack remarked that playing the game yielded one of his most enjoyable gaming experiences, citing the combination of "brutal" platforming and an "exceptionally well realized" art style. Joe Skrebels of IGN declared every scene a "masterwork" and commended the sound work, calling it an "ideal match" to the aesthetics. He called platforming battles the most imaginative part, and the lack of enemy health bars its "smartest" and "most devilish" feature. He found the battles rewarding and "one of 'Cuphead's greatest strengths". He said the "run 'n' gun, left-to-right platforming" lacked inventiveness, and criticized the "parry system" and control scheme. Chris Schilling of PC Gamer liked the "reliable jump and dash" controls with "nimble and responsive" handling. Schilling explained that certain random elements meant "you can't simply learn patterns by rote and rely entirely on muscle memory". Chris Plante of Polygon said the game educates the player in strategy through trial and error. He enjoyed the "crucial" and "relatively forgiving" parrying system more than the various attacks. He complained that the final bosses diminished the game's greatest features, and that the difficulty "eventually goes too far". Colm Ahern of VideoGamer.com wrote, "Cuphead will best most games in how it looks and sounds, and defeating that boss that you once deemed unbeatable is glorious." He criticized the final bosses, saying that the challenge was "a step too far".

=== Sales ===
In the first two weeks of release, more than one million copies of Cuphead were sold worldwide. Sales reached more than four million by July 2019, and five million by its second anniversary of release. By the time it was released for the PlayStation 4 in July 2020, it had reached 6 million sales.

Cuphead: The Delicious Last Course accumulated a total of one million sales within less than two weeks of its launch. In December, MDHR said that it sold over two million copies.

=== Awards ===
Entertainment Weekly placed Cuphead fifth on the list of its "Best Games of 2017", GamesRadar+ ranked it ninth on its list of the 25 Best Games of 2017", and Polygon ranked it 14th on its list of the "50 best games of 2017". In Game Informer's Reader's Choice Best of 2017 Awards, the game won the "Best Microsoft Game" and "Best Co-op Multiplayer" categories, and got third place for "Best Action Game". The website also gave it the awards for "Best Microsoft Exclusive" in its "Best of 2017 Awards", and for "Best Bosses" in its 2017 Action Game of the Year Awards. EGMNow ranked the game at #2 on its list of the 25 best games of 2017. The Verge named it one of its 15 best video games of 2017.

Cuphead was nominated for "Breakout Game of the Year" in PC Gamer's 2017 Game of the Year Awards, and won the award for "Best Xbox One Game" in Destructoid's Game of the Year Awards 2017. It won "Best Xbox One Game" and "Best Art Direction" in IGN's Best of 2017 Awards, whereas its other nominations were for "Game of the Year", "Best PC Game", "Best Platformer", "Best Original Music", and "Best Multiplayer". It won "Best Looking Game" and "Best Style", and was runner-up for "Best Shopkeeper" for the character Porkrind, "Best Music", "Best Debut", and "Game of the Year" at Giant Bomb's Game of the Year 2017 Awards. The game won all six awards for "Animation, Artistic", "Art Direction, Period Influence", "Character Design", "Control Precision", "Game, Original Family" and "Original Light Mix Score, New IP" at the 17th Annual NAVGTR Awards, while The Delicious Last Course was nominated for the "Outstanding Animation, Artistic", "Outstanding Art Direction, Period Influence", "Outstanding Character Design", "Outstanding Game, Franchise Family", and "Outstanding Original Light Mix Score, Franchise" awards at the 22nd Annual NAVGTR Awards, winning only three of them ("Outstanding Animation, Artistic", "Outstanding Game, Franchise Family", and "Outstanding Original Light Mix Score, Franchise").

In the week of September 14, 2019, the album Selected Tunes from Cuphead topped the Jazz Albums Billboard charts. It became the first video game to do so. It was also ranked #1 on the Billboard Traditional Jazz and #6 on the Billboard Vinyl Charts that week. The game was awarded a Guinness World Record for being the first game to reach first place on a Billboard chart.

List of awards and nominations for Cuphead
Year	Award	Category	Result	Ref.
2017	Golden Joystick Awards	Best Visual Design	Won	
2017	Golden Joystick Awards	Best Xbox Game of the Year	Won	
2017	The Game Awards 2017	Best Art Direction	Won	
2017	The Game Awards 2017	Best Independent Game	Won	
2017	The Game Awards 2017	Best Debut Indie Game	Won	
2017	The Game Awards 2017	Best Score/Music	Nominated	
2017	The Game Awards 2017	Best Action Game	Nominated	
2018	45th Annie Awards	Outstanding Achievement for Character Animation in a Video Game (Hanna Abi-Hanna)	Won	
2018	45th Annie Awards	Outstanding Achievement for Character Animation in a Video Game (Tina Nawrocki)	Nominated	
2018	21st Annual D.I.C.E. Awards	Game of the Year	Nominated	
2018	21st Annual D.I.C.E. Awards	Action Game of the Year	Nominated	
2018	21st Annual D.I.C.E. Awards	Outstanding Achievement in Animation	Won	
2018	21st Annual D.I.C.E. Awards	Outstanding Achievement in Art Direction	Won	
2018	21st Annual D.I.C.E. Awards	Outstanding Achievement in Original Music Composition	Won	
2018	SXSW Gaming Awards	Excellence in Musical Score	Nominated	
2018	SXSW Gaming Awards	Excellence in Visual Achievement	Nominated	
2018	SXSW Gaming Awards	Excellence in Animation	Won	
2018	SXSW Gaming Awards	Excellence in Art	Won	
2018	SXSW Gaming Awards	Most Promising New Intellectual Property	Nominated	
2018	SXSW Gaming Awards	Excellence in Design	Nominated	
2018	Independent Games Festival Awards	Excellence in Visual Art	Nominated	
2018	Independent Games Festival Awards	Excellence in Audio	Nominated	
2018	Game Developers Choice Awards	Best Audio	Nominated	
2018	Game Developers Choice Awards	Best Debut (Studio MDHR)	Won	
2018	Game Developers Choice Awards	Best Visual Art	Won	
2018	Cartoons on the Bay Pulcinella Awards 2018	Interactive Media	Won	
2018	14th British Academy Games Awards	Artistic Achievement	Nominated	
2018	14th British Academy Games Awards	Debut Game	Nominated	
2018	14th British Academy Games Awards	Music	Won	
2018	14th British Academy Games Awards	Original Property	Nominated	
2018	2018 Webby Awards	Action	Nominated	
2018	2018 Webby Awards	Best Art Direction	Won	
2018	2018 Webby Awards	Best Visual Design (People's Voice)	Won	
2018	Develop Awards	Sound Design (Sweet Justice Sound)	Nominated	
2018	The Independent Game Developers' Association Awards	Best Arcade Game	Nominated	
2018	The Independent Game Developers' Association Awards	Visual Design	Nominated	
2022	Golden Joystick Awards	Best Game Expansion (The Delicious Last Course)	Won	
2023	26th Annual D.I.C.E. Awards	Outstanding Achievement in Animation (The Delicious Last Course)	Nominated	
2023	50th Annie Awards	Best Character Animation - Video Game (The Delicious Last Course)	Won	
2023	19th British Academy Games Awards	Music (The Delicious Last Course)	Nominated	

== Legacy ==
=== Merchandise ===
Since its release, Cuphead has expanded into a broader brand encompassing various forms of licensed merchandise, including accessories and collectibles. In 2019, McFarlane Toys launched a series of Cuphead-themed construction sets. The following year, in 2020, Arby's released limited-edition toys and papercrafts inspired by Cuphead characters in select locations. In 2022, Youtooz released a line of limited-edition Cuphead figures. That same year, Studio MDHR collaborated with Zara on a Cuphead-themed clothing collection. In 2023, Good Smile Company released Nendoroid figures of Cuphead and Mugman.

=== Cultural impact ===
Cuphead has been referenced and featured in other video games. In 2018, the co-creator of Bendy and the Ink Machine expressed interest in a crossover with Cuphead in an interview. In the 2018 fighting game Super Smash Bros. Ultimate, a Cuphead Mii Fighter costume was added via downloadable content in January 2020, accompanied by the boss level theme "Floral Fury". Four Cuphead-themed "spirits" were added to the game in February 2020. The game Fall Guys released Cuphead and Mugman costumes in 2021. In 2022, a Ms. Chalice costume was released in the game as well.

Cuphead has appeared in exhibitions and promotional media. In 2021, a 3D-printed zoetrope based on the game was displayed at The Story of the Moving Image exhibition at the Australian Centre for the Moving Image in Melbourne. The exhibit, created by Studio MDHR, used strobing light to animate individual character models, depicting scenes such as Cuphead jumping into a bucket of paint, King Dice dancing, and Mugman and Ms. Chalice avoiding attacks from the Devil. In 2022, Cuphead made an appearance in a GEICO advertisement. The Japanese physical release of Cuphead in April 2023 featured cover art by Yoshitaka Amano, who produced an original illustration of the game's characters in his signature style. The release attracted attention online and was well received by fans.

Cuphead has influenced other creative works and is credited with contributing to the revival of rubber hose animation in video games, a loose-limbed, physics-defying style popularized by Fleischer Studios during the Great Depression. Writing for GamingBible, Sam Cawley described Cuphead as one of the titles that helped reintroduce this distinctive aesthetic into the “mainstream”. The Michigan Daily's Isabella Casagrande similarly observed that rubber hose animation experienced a resurgence in the late 2010s following the success of games such as Cuphead. Grant St. Clair of Boing Boing further characterized the game as inspiring a “wave of rubber hose–style games”. PCGamesN‘s Anthony McGlynn described Cuphead as a “standard-bearer” for developers adopting early 20th-century animation styles, particularly in projects with darker or more subversive themes. Following the release of Cuphead, several subsequent titles have drawn direct inspiration from the game. Enchanted Portals (2023), developed by Xixo Games Studio, is a run-and-gun title influenced by Cuphead. Mystic Clockwork Studio’s upcoming title Exil was also inspired by Cuphead during its development. Other games that have drawn comparisons include Acecraft (2025), Bad Cheese (2025), Mouse: P.I. for Hire(2026), and Toonsouls (TBD).

== Sequels ==
=== Mighty Cuphead Adventure ===
In June 2026, Studio MDHR revealed Mighty Cuphead Adventure at Summer Game Fest 2026. According to Studio MDHR, the game was programmed in Assembly language with the original Sega Master System in mind. Mighty Cuphead Adventure is set to be released on the Sega Master System, PlayStation 5, Xbox Series X and Series S, Nintendo Switch 2, and Windows.

According to Video Games Chronicle, Studio MDHR said, "That's right, this is a brand-new, riveting Cuphead video game that will bring the most advanced 8-bit action platforming to life on your television set in 32 dazzling colors."

Chad Moldenhauer said in a statement that, "When it came time to peel back the curtain and share a little bit about what we've been up to, we couldn't imagine a more fun way to do so than with today's Special Bulletin." He also noted that Toronto’s Stop Motion Department and the Continue Agency are playing a part in development.

Unlike the boss-rush structure of the original game, Mighty Cuphead Adventure is planned to be a fast-paced 2D side-scrolling platformer. The player controls Cuphead or Mugman in single-player or local two-player cooperative modes; there is also speculation that other characters such as Ms. Chalice and Elder Kettle will be featured as playable characters.

As shown in teasers, some of the bosses in the 2017 video game Cuphead will return as fights. The game's art style features an arcade style in an 8-bit, 32-colour palette, similar to that of Castle of Illusion.

== Other media ==
=== Books ===
Since 2019, Dark Horse Comics has been developing Cuphead graphic novels. The first one, Cuphead Volume 1: Comic Capers & Curios, was released in August 2020. Cuphead Vol. 2: Cartoon Chronicles & Calamities was released in March 2021. In August 2024, the third graphic novel Cuphead Volume 3: Colorful Crack-Ups & Chaos was released. A novel was also released in March 2020 by Studio MDHR.

=== Tabletop game ===
A tabletop game, Cuphead: Fast Rolling Dice Game, was released in 2021, featuring a companion app for iOS and Android that plays music and calculates the score.

=== The Cuphead Show! ===
The Cuphead Show!, an animated series based on the game and produced by Netflix Animation, was announced in July 2019. The show does not use pen-and-paper animation as the game does; instead, it uses digital animation. Chad and Jared Moldenhauer serve as executive producers alongside CJ Kettler from King Features Syndicate. The series premiered on February 18, 2022. On August 19, 2022, the 13-episode second season was released worldwide. The 11-episode third season was released on November 18, 2022.
