= Chad and Jared Moldenhauer =

Canadian video game developers (born 1979 and 1980)

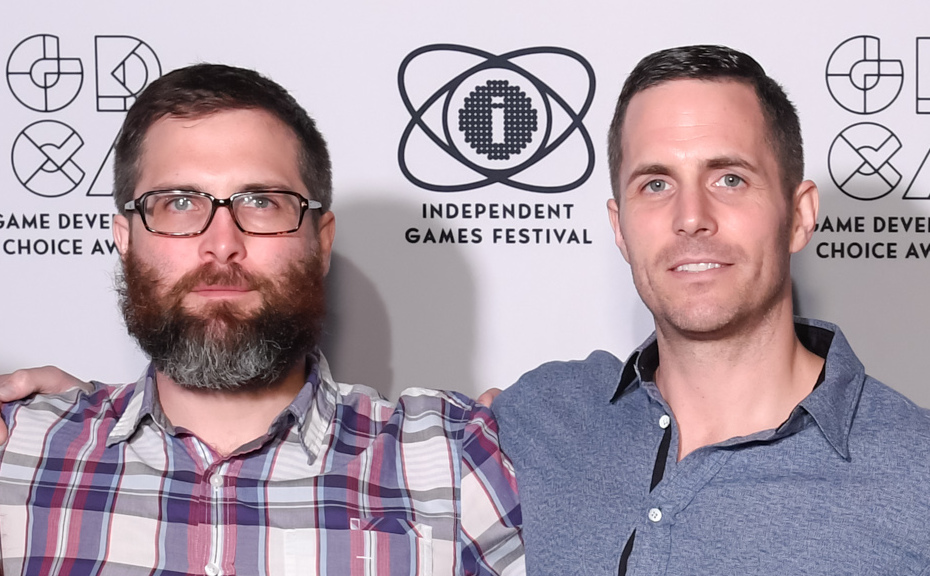
- Chad (right) and Jared (left) in 2018
- Occupation: Video game developers
- Years active: 2010–present
- Notable work: Cuphead; The Cuphead Show!
- Website: studiomdhr.com
- Chad Moldenhauer
- Born: 1979 (age 46–47); Regina, Saskatchewan, Canada
- Spouse: Marija Moldenhauer
- Jared Moldenhauer
- Born: 1980 (age 45–46); Regina, Saskatchewan, Canada

Chad Moldenhauer (born 1979) and Jared Moldenhauer (born 1980) are Canadian brothers and video game developers. Co-founders of the independent video game company Studio MDHR, they are best known for creating and directing the run-and-gun video game Cuphead (2017), which achieved widespread critical and commercial success for its hand-drawn animation style inspired by rubber hose cartoons from the golden age of American animation.

== Early life and influences ==
Chad and Jared Moldenhauer were both raised in Regina, Saskatchewan, where they developed an early interest in video games and classical animation. They have cited 1930s American cartoons particularly those produced by Fleischer Studios and early Disney cartoons as major influences on their visual style.

None of the Moldenhauers pursued formal education in game development. Prior to working full-time on Cuphead, Chad worked in graphic and web design, while Jared held employment outside the video game industry, including construction work.

== Career ==
=== Early development and Studio MDHR ===
The Moldenhauers began developing Cuphead in 2010 as a side project while maintaining full‑time employment. The project expanded in scope over several years of development. In order to complete production, the Moldenhauers eventually left their respective jobs and remortgaged their homes to finance production.

They formally established Studio MDHR, the name being derived from an abbreviation of their surname to support development and collaborated with a team of artists and programmers. The game's animation was produced by hand on paper before being scanned and inked digitally, contributing to Cuphead's extended production timeline. The Moldenhauers have emphasised handcrafted animation techniques and gameplay design influenced by early arcade titles, and noted their commitment to maintaining visual authenticity despite modern production methods.

=== Cuphead ===
Cuphead was released in 2017 for Xbox One and Microsoft Windows, with later ports to other platforms. The game received widespread acclaim for its animation, art direction, music, and difficulty, selling millions of copies worldwide. Media coverage frequently highlighted the prolonged development process and the challenges faced by the Moldenhauers as independent creators.

=== Expansion of the franchise ===
Following the success of Cuphead, the Moldenhauers oversaw related projects, including the Cuphead's DLC Cuphead: The Delicious Last Course (2022), the Netflix animated series The Cuphead Show! (2022), on which they served as executive producers, and the upcoming follow-up game Mighty Cuphead Adventures, and a sequel to the original Cuphead.

== Accolades ==
The Moldenhauers have received recognition for their work on Cuphead and related projects. Cuphead won at the 2017 ceremony of the Game Awards for Best Independent Game, Best Art Direction, and Best Debut Indie Game, and was nominated for Best Action Game and Best Original Score. The game also received recognition at the Annie Awards and D.I.C.E. Awards, and was nominated at the BAFTA Games Awards for Artistic Achievement, Best Debut Game, and Best Original Property.

As executive producers of The Cuphead Show!, the Moldenhauers were part of the creative team nominated for a Children's and Family Emmy Award for Outstanding Animated Series in 2022.

== Notable works ==
- Cuphead (2017) – creators and directors
  - Cuphead: The Delicious Last Course (2022)
- The Cuphead Show! (2022) – executive producers
- Mighty Cuphead Adventure (upcoming)
- Untitled Cuphead sequel (upcoming)
