= CJ Kettler =

American television producer

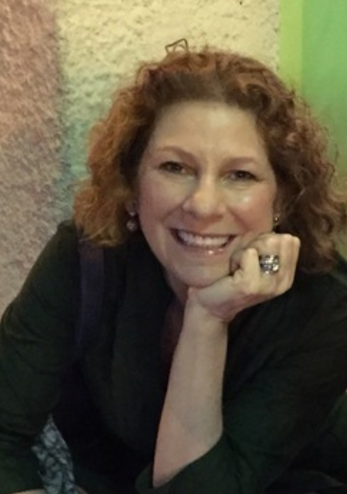
- Occupations: Media Executive, Executive Producer, Board Director and Advisor
- Years active: 1985–present

CJ Kettler is an American television producer, media executive, and entrepreneur. She has held senior management positions with Hearst, MTV Networks, Vestron, Oxygen Media, Channel One News, Travelzoo, LIME, and others.

Kettler was CEO and chair of Channel One News (2012–2014) and after selling it to Houghton Mifflin Harcourt, she was EVP, chief of consumer brands and strategy at HMH until May 2017. As of December 2017, Kettler is the president of King Features Syndicate, a division of Hearst.

== Career ==
After completing Bachelor of Arts degree in sociology from Smith College, Kettler started her career at CBS in programming research, moving on to McCann Erickson and then MTV. At Vestron Video she managed the Children’s Video Library.

After selling Sunbow Entertainment to Sony, Kettler worked as president of sales and marketing at Oxygen Media. In 2005, she founded the lifestyle brand LIME. Lime was sold to Gaiam in July 2007.

From 2008 to 2013, Kettler was a partner at Propeller Partners. She was president of Travelzoo, and also held positions at CBS, McCann-Erickson, Vestron, and MTV Networks. Kettler joined Channel Channel One News as CEO in November 2012. And was EVP, Chief of Consumer Brands & Strategy at HMH until May 2017.

In December 2017, she was named as the president of King Features Syndicate to focus on their new initiatives across multiple media platforms.

== Production credits ==
As a television producer, Kettler was nominated for an Emmy for Outstanding Children’s Program for Carmen Sandiego and The Cuphead Show. She produced several animated series. She is currently executive producer of The Cuphead Show! For Netflix. Her credits include:

Television Series	Episodes	Year	Role
It's Your Birthday with Rainbow Brite	1	1985	Executive Producer
My Little Pony n' Friends	65	1986–1993	Executive Producer
Bucky O'Hare and the Toad Wars!	13	1991	Executive Producer
My Little Pony Tales	26	1992–1993	Executive Producer
Conan the Adventurer	65	1992	Executive Producer
The Tick	36	1994–1997	Executive Producer
The Mask: Animated Series	55	1995–1998	Executive Producer
Littlest Pet Shop	40	1995	Executive Producer
The Brothers Flub	26	1999–2000	Executive Producer
Salty's Lighthouse	13	1997–1998	Executive Producer
Fat Dog Mendoza	26	1998–2001	CoProduction Development
The Cramp Twins	52	2001–2004	CoProduction Development
Carmen Sandiego	32	2019	Executive Producer
The Cuphead Show!	36	2022	Executive Producer

== Appointments and awards ==
Kettler is on the board of directors at the Environmental Working Group. In 2006, she received The Highest Leaf Award from the Women’s Venture Fund. In 2018, she received Emmy nomination for Carmen Sandiego, Outstanding Children’s Program.
