= Rubber hose animation =

Early American animation style

A scene from Steamboat Willie (1928), in which Mickey Mouse steers a boat with exaggerated movements typical of rubber hose animation.

Rubber hose animation was the first animation style that became standardized in the American animation industry. The defining feature of the style is "rubber-hose limbs"—arms, and sometimes legs, that are typically drawn as flowing curves, without articulation (no hinged knees or elbows). This style makes most moving animated objects exhibit a curving motion, resembling the physical properties of a rubber hose. The well known most famous examples of this style are Mickey Mouse and Betty Boop. While the rubber hose art style fell out of fashion by the late 1930s, it has experienced a renewed interest since the early 2010s.

== History ==
=== Beginnings and rise ===
The 1930 Fleischer Studios short Swing You Sinners!, an example of Fleischer's signature mix of rubber hose animation, surreal visuals and dark subject matter.

In the early days of hand drawn animation in the 1920s, American animation production companies were not located in Hollywood but in New York City. Back then, animation was a new phenomenon and there were no experienced animators around, yet there were skilled artists employed at newspapers creating comic strips, another relatively new medium. Many of them became fascinated with the introduction of moving drawings and put their skills into this new format.

As animated cartoons became popular, the industry's small workforce of animators struggled to keep up. Their design choices were a mix of intention and necessity.

Studios had to be sensitive to any new business trend to survive the competition. A consequence of this was that the designs of the most successful and popular cartoons had a great impact on the rest of the animation business. One such example was Otto Messmer's Felix the Cat, who quickly spawned imitators from different studios. Bill Nolan is credited with the introduction of the rubber-hose style while animating Felix the Cat shorts in the 1920s. Nolan altered the design of the title character, giving Felix a rounder, smoother look. This new design, besides being faster to draft, also gave characters the "rubbery" limbs, with no knees or elbow joints, which they could stretch to far distances or be neatly tied in knots. Using such fluid, flexible movements made the animation process easier and faster, and the surreal quality of the resulting pictures captivated the audiences. Nolan would introduce a more refined style to Universal Pictures' Oswald the Lucky Rabbit series after he found work at Universal's newly founded cartoon division; the series' earlier animation style by Walt Disney and Ub Iwerks, a less surreal variant which is more reliant on mechanical humor, would form the basis for the popular Mickey Mouse series.

=== Introduction of sound ===
The rubber hose styled film found popularity with the use of its sound. While Disney found wild success for the use of music in their Mickey Mouse films, this studio was not the first or only to use sound in their film. Following just second to Disney, The Fleischer Brothers (who would eventually help found Red Seal distribution company, later renamed Fleischer Studios) also used musical elements to enhance their films. They developed Song Car-Tunes, a project that invited the audience to sing along to a tune throughout the film. The bouncing ball that is used in sing-alongs today to bounce word-to-word was introduced by the Fleischer brothers as well. Many other creators understood that the frame-by-frame style lent itself well to the addition of music due to the frames being able to be synced perfectly with the corresponding sound. Disney, wanting to press this idea even further, developed the Silly Symphonies series. Moving away from slapstick humor, this series focused more on the synchronization of the sound. This meant that the shorts were tamer with the music being the focal point as opposed to visual gags.

=== Decline ===
Rubber-hose animation gradually faded away as cartoons were made more sophisticated. The fad of realism in animation, with the appearance of lifelike anatomy and natural movement, added to more advanced film techniques like Technicolor, led to the decline of the rubber-hose style.

Walt Disney's massive success with his first full-length animated feature film Snow White and the Seven Dwarfs, released in 1937, was key in changing the trend. In Hollywood, most cartoon studios of the early 1930s (many of them founded by former Disney animators) copied this new realistic trend. In New York, Disney's influence took longer to grab hold. Fleischer Studios held on to the rubber-hose style the longest, finally conforming to the more contemporary West Coast animation style by 1940.

== Influence ==
The rubber-hose style eventually appeared in some later cartoons, such as The Warner Siblings from Animaniacs by Warner Bros. Animation. It has also been a major influence in video games such as Cuphead (and its animated series adaptation) and Mouse: P.I. for Hire.

=== Theatrical film ===
In 2013, Walt Disney Animation Studios produced Get a Horse!, a 3D animated slapstick comedy short film using the style. It combines black-and-white hand-drawn animation with color CGI. The short features characters from late 1920s Disney cartoons and archival recordings of Walt Disney in a posthumous role as Mickey Mouse. It is the first original Mickey Mouse theatrical animated short since Runaway Brain (1995) and the first appearance of Oswald the Lucky Rabbit in a Disney animated production in 85 years.

=== Television ===
The 2013 Mickey Mouse series uses an animation style reminiscent of rubber hose animation through Toon Boom and Flash animation, complementing the art style and humor of the original series.

== See also ==
- Golden age of American animation
