= Travelzoo =

Online travel deal company

Travelzoo Inc.
- Type: Public
- Traded as: Nasdaq: TZOO; Russell 2000 Index component
- Industry: Internet media
- Founded: 1998; 28 years ago
- Headquarters: New York City
- Area served: United States, Canada, Australia, China, Hong Kong, Japan, Singapore, United Kingdom
- Revenue: ▼$106.5 million (2017)
- Number of employees: 422 (2018)
- Website: travelzoo.com

Travelzoo Inc. is an Internet company that publishes deals from more than 2,000 travel, entertainment and local businesses such as restaurants and spas. It has 28 million members in North America, Europe, and Asia Pacific and 25 offices worldwide.

Companies pay to advertise their deals with Travelzoo, but only those approved by Travelzoo are listed.

== History ==
In October 1998, Travelzoo founder Ralph Bartel, a former print and television journalist, launched Travelzoo.com with an initial investment of $10,000. In September 2000, Travelzoo published its first Top 20 and e-mailed one million U.S. members. In December 2003, Travelzoo became publicly traded on the NASDAQ SmallCap Market under the ticker symbol "TZOO".

In April 2004, Travelzoo announced that the company's publications had reached over 7 million members, a 75% increase over the 4 million members Travelzoo counted in April 2003.

On March 31, 2006, Travelzoo announced that Forbes.com rated the Travelzoo Web site as one of the best Web sites for travel-related information and travel deals.

Travelzoo acquired Travelzoo Asia Pacific in 2015 to take advantage of the region's increased travel growth.

In October 2015, Travelzoo's CEO Chris Loughlin announced he would step down by the end of the year, to be succeeded temporarily by chairman Holger Bartel.

In September 2024, Litchfield Hills Research initiated coverage on shares of Travelzoo (NASDAQ:TZOO) with a Buy rating and set a price target of $35.00.
