= 27th National Television Awards =

British awards ceremony in 2022

- Date: 13 October 2022
- Location: OVO Arena Wembley, London
- Country: United Kingdom
- Presented by: Various
- Hosted by: Joel Dommett
- Most awards: Emmerdale; I'm a Celebrity...Get Me Out of Here!; Peaky Blinders; Strictly Come Dancing (2)
- Most nominations: Bridgerton; Britain's Got Talent; EastEnders; Emmerdale; Heartstopper (3)
- Website: www.nationaltvawards.com

Television/radio coverage
- Network: ITV
- Runtime: 150 minutes

The 27th National Television Awards were held on 13 October 2022 at OVO Arena Wembley. It was hosted by Joel Dommett. The ceremony is typically held at the O2 Arena in Greenwich, but due to the damage the arena endured during Storm Eunice, it was confirmed that the awards would be held at Wembley. Originally scheduled to be held on 15 September 2022, they were since postponed to 13 October as a mark of respect following the death of Elizabeth II. The longlist nominations were released on 24 May 2022 and the shortlist was announced on 23 August 2022. Later that week, the ceremony announced that Robbie Williams would perform a medley of his discography, as well as a performance from Lewis Capaldi. In early October, Sam Ryder was announced to open the event instead of Williams.

== Performances ==
- Sam Ryder – "Space Man" & "Somebody"
- Lewis Capaldi – "Forget Me"

== Awards ==
Category and presenter(s)	Winner	Nominated
"The Bruce Forsyth Entertainment Award"; Presented by Oti Mabuse & Michelle Visage	I'm a Celebrity...Get Me Out of Here! (ITV)	Taskmaster (Channel 4) The Graham Norton Show (BBC One) Ant & Dec's Saturday Night Takeaway (ITV)
"Expert"; Presented by Noel Fitzpatrick	Martin Lewis (The Martin Lewis Money Show)	Jay Blades (The Repair Shop) Sir David Attenborough (The Green Planet) Kaleb Cooper (Clarkson's Farm)
"Serial Drama Performance"; Presented by Gemma and Michael Owen	Mark Charnock (Marlon Dingle, Emmerdale – ITV)	Paige Sandhu (Meena Jutla, Emmerdale – ITV); Gillian Wright (Jean Slater, EastEnders – BBC One); Rose Ayling-Ellis (Frankie Lewis, EastEnders – BBC One)
"Comedy"; Presented by Matt Lucas	After Life (Netflix)	Not Going Out (BBC One) Sex Education (Netflix) Derry Girls (Channel 4)
"New Drama"; Presented by Stephen Mangan	Trigger Point (ITV)	Heartstopper (Netflix) This Is Going to Hurt (BBC One) Time (BBC One)
"Quiz Game Show"; Presented by Anneka Rice	Beat the Chasers (ITV)	Michael McIntyre's The Wheel (BBC One) In for a Penny (ITV) The 1% Club (ITV)
"Rising Star"; Presented by AJ Odudu & Emma Willis	Paddy Bever (Max Turner, Coronation Street)	Charithra Chandran (Edwina Sharma, Bridgerton) Kit Connor (Nick Nelson, Heartstopper) Joe Locke (Charlie Spring, Heartstopper)
"Authored Documentary"; Presented by Alex Jones	Kate Garraway: Caring for Derek (ITV)	Julia Bradbury: Breast Cancer and Me (ITV) Paddy and Christine McGuinness: Our Family and Autism (BBC One) Katie Price: What Harvey Did Next (BBC One) Tom Parker: Inside My Head (Channel 4)
"Special Recognition"; Presented by Joel Dommett	Sir Lenny Henry	
"Daytime"; Presented by Ellie Simmonds & Nikita Kuzmin	This Morning (ITV)	Loose Women (ITV) The Chase (ITV) The Repair Shop (BBC One)
"Drama Performance"; Presented by Stephen McGann	Cillian Murphy (Thomas Shelby, Peaky Blinders)	Vicky McClure (Lana Washington, Trigger Point) Jonathan Bailey (Anthony Bridgerton, Bridgerton) Nicola Walker (Hannah, The Split)
"Factual Entertainment"; Presented by Iain Stirling & Laura Whitmore	Gogglebox (Channel 4)	Clarkson's Farm (Amazon Prime Video) Paul O'Grady: For the Love of Dogs (ITV) The Great British Bake Off (Channel 4)
"Returning Drama"; Presented by Leah Williamson, Millie Bright & Jill Scott	Peaky Blinders (BBC One)	Bridgerton (Netflix) Call the Midwife (BBC One) The Split (BBC One)
"TV Presenter"; Presented by Timur Miroshnychenko	Ant & Dec (Ant & Dec's Saturday Night Takeaway, Britain's Got Talent and I'm a Celebrity...Get Me Out of Here!)	Alison Hammond (This Morning) Bradley Walsh (Beat the Chasers and The Chase) Graham Norton (The Graham Norton Show)
"Talent Show"; Presented by Maya Jama	Strictly Come Dancing (BBC One)	Britain's Got Talent (ITV) RuPaul's Drag Race UK (BBC Three) The Masked Singer UK (ITV)
"Serial Drama"; Presented by Boy George	Emmerdale (ITV)	Coronation Street (ITV) EastEnders (BBC One) Neighbours (Channel 5/10 Peach)
"Talent Show Judge"; Presented by Mark Owen	Anton Du Beke (Strictly Come Dancing)	RuPaul (RuPaul's Drag Race UK) David Walliams (Britain's Got Talent) Mo Gilligan (The Masked Singer)

== Programmes with multiple nominations ==
Programmes with multiple nominations
Nominations	Programme
3	Bridgerton
3	Britain's Got Talent
3	EastEnders
3	Emmerdale
3	Heartstopper
2
2	Ant & Dec's Saturday Night Takeaway
2	Beat the Chasers
2	Clarkson's Farm
2	Coronation Street
2	I'm a Celebrity...Get Me Out of Here!
2	Peaky Blinders
2	RuPaul's Drag Race UK
2	Strictly Come Dancing
2	The Chase
2	The Graham Norton Show
2	The Masked Singer
2	The Repair Shop
2	The Split
2	This Morning
2	Trigger Point

Networks with multiple nominations
Nominations	Network
26	ITV
20	BBC One
8	Netflix
5	Channel 4
2	Amazon Prime Video
2	BBC Three

== Programmes with multiple wins ==
Programmes with multiple wins
Wins	Programme
2	Emmerdale
2	I'm a Celebrity...Get Me Out of Here!
2	Peaky Blinders
2	Strictly Come Dancing

Networks with multiple wins
Wins	Network
10	ITV
4	BBC One

== See also ==
- 2022 in British television
- Storm Eunice
