= Children's and Family Emmy Award for Outstanding Lead Performer =

Award for lead performer in a television series

Children's and Family Emmy Award for Outstanding Lead Performer in a Preschool, Children's or Young Teen Program
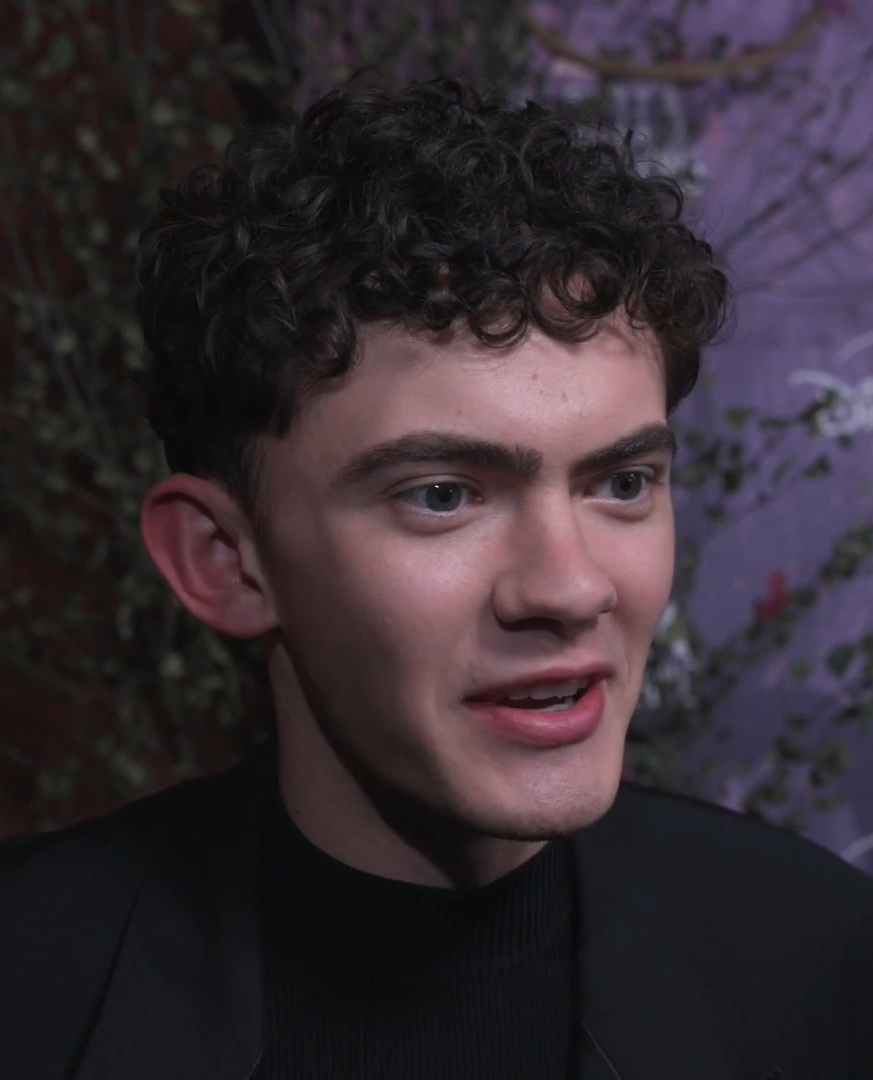
- The 2025 recipient: Joe Locke
- Awarded for: Outstanding Lead Performance in a Preschool, Children's or Young Teen Program
- Country: United States
- Presented by: Academy of Television Arts & Sciences
- First award: 2022
- Currently held by: Joe Locke, Heartstopper, 2025
- Website: theemmys.tv/childrens/

The Children's and Family Emmy Award for Outstanding Lead Performer in a Preschool, Children's or Young Teen Program is an award which honors performances in both television series and made-for-television/streaming films. The category was established at the 1st Children's and Family Emmy Awards in 2022, and is open to performers of all genders. The current holder of the award is Joe Locke, who won at the 4th Children's and Family Emmy Awards for his role as Charlie Spring in Netflix series Heartstopper.

== Background ==
On November 17, 2021, the NATAS announced the creation of the Children's and Family Emmy Awards to recognize the best in children's and family television. The organization cited an "explosive growth in the quantity and quality of children’s and family programming" as justification for a dedicated ceremony. Many categories of the awards were previously presented at the Daytime Emmy Awards. Performers in programming aimed towards children and young people were previously honored with the Daytime Emmy Award for Outstanding Performer in Children's Programming, which was presented under various names however, following the announcement of the establishment of the Children's and Family Emmy Awards, these categories were discontinued.

The original name for the category was Outstanding Lead Performance in a Preschool, Children's or Young Teen Program, and the award received its current name as of the 3rd Children's and Family Emmy Awards.

== Winners and nominations ==
=== 2020s ===
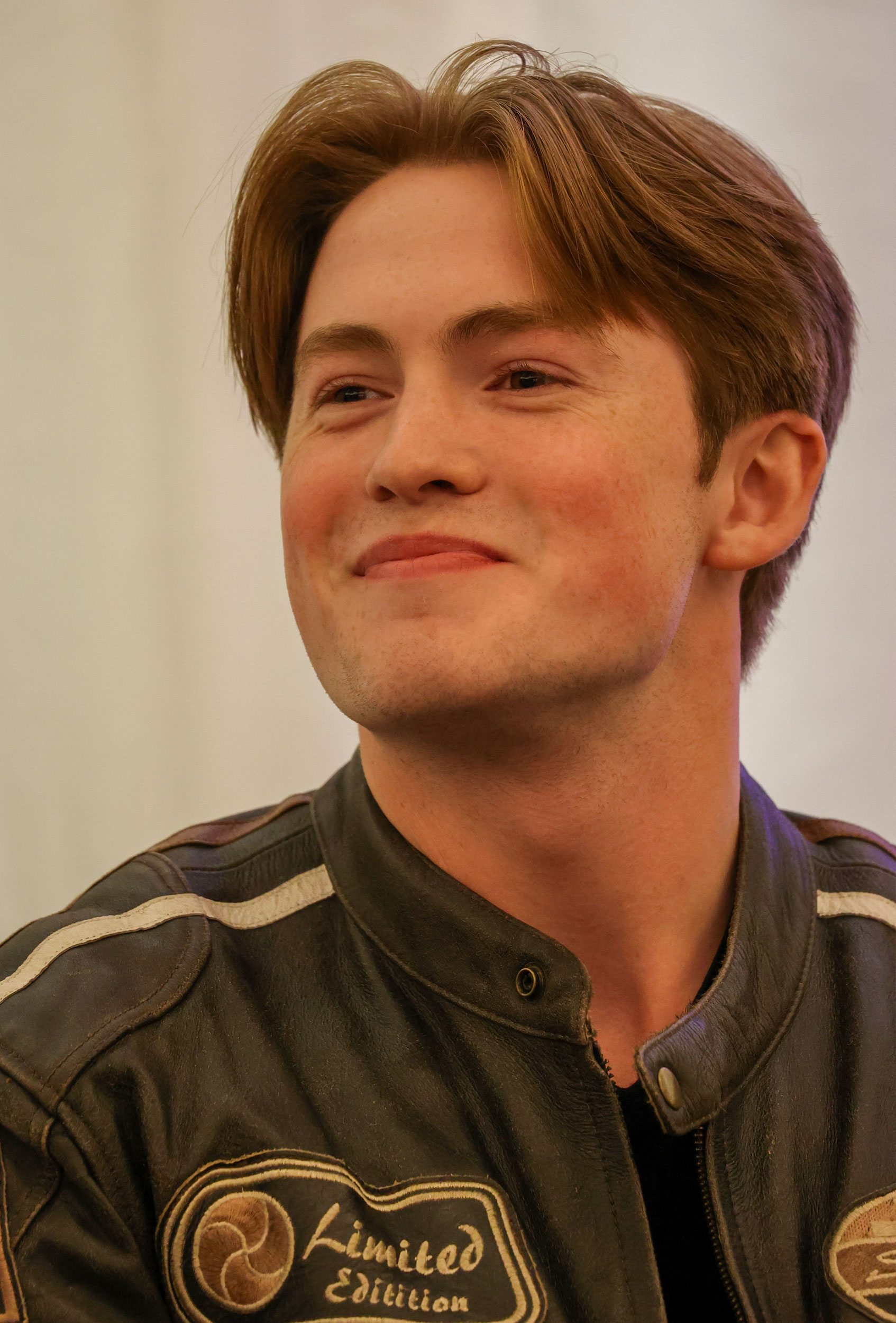
Inaugural recipient Kit Connor.

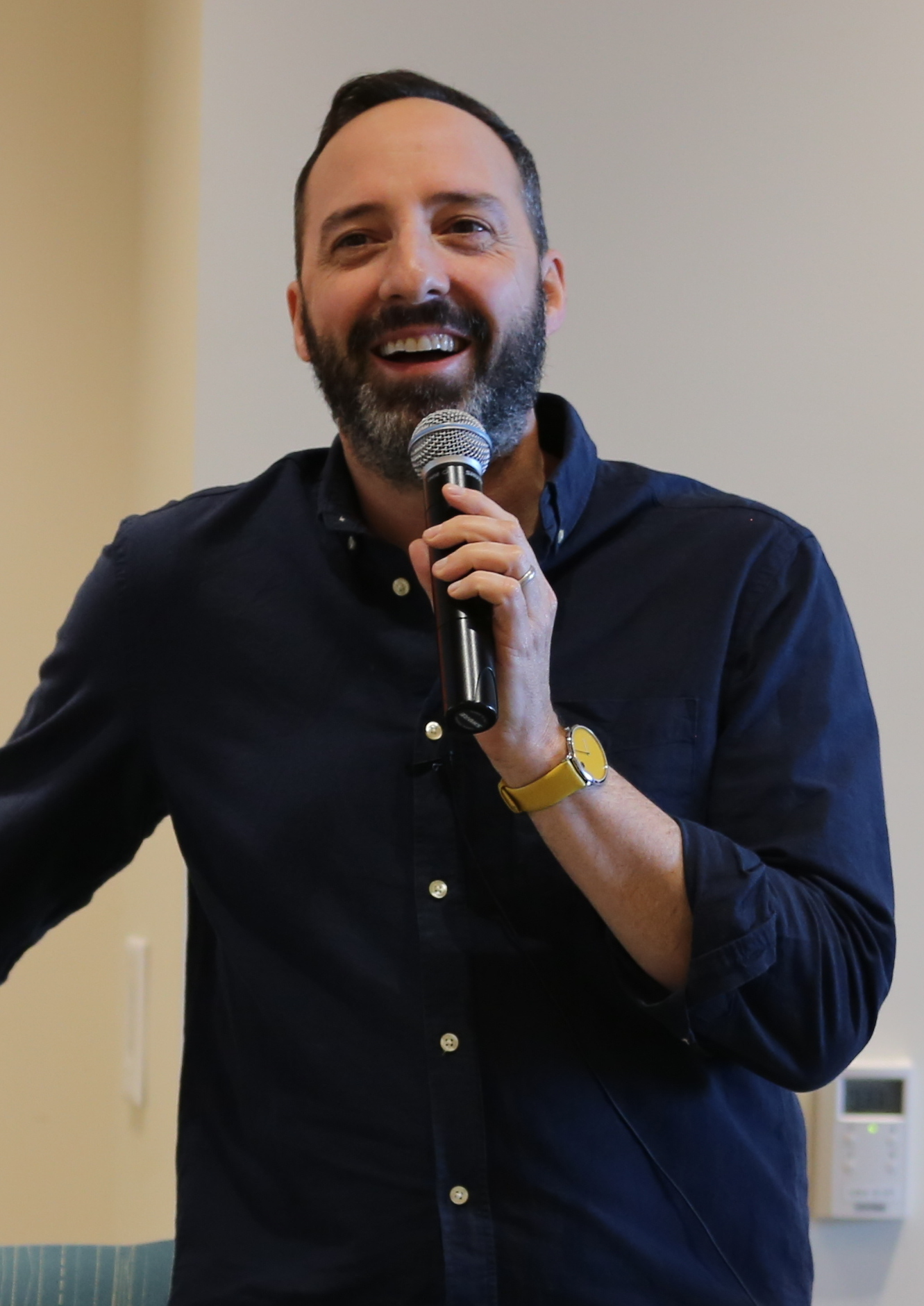
2023 winner Tony Hale.

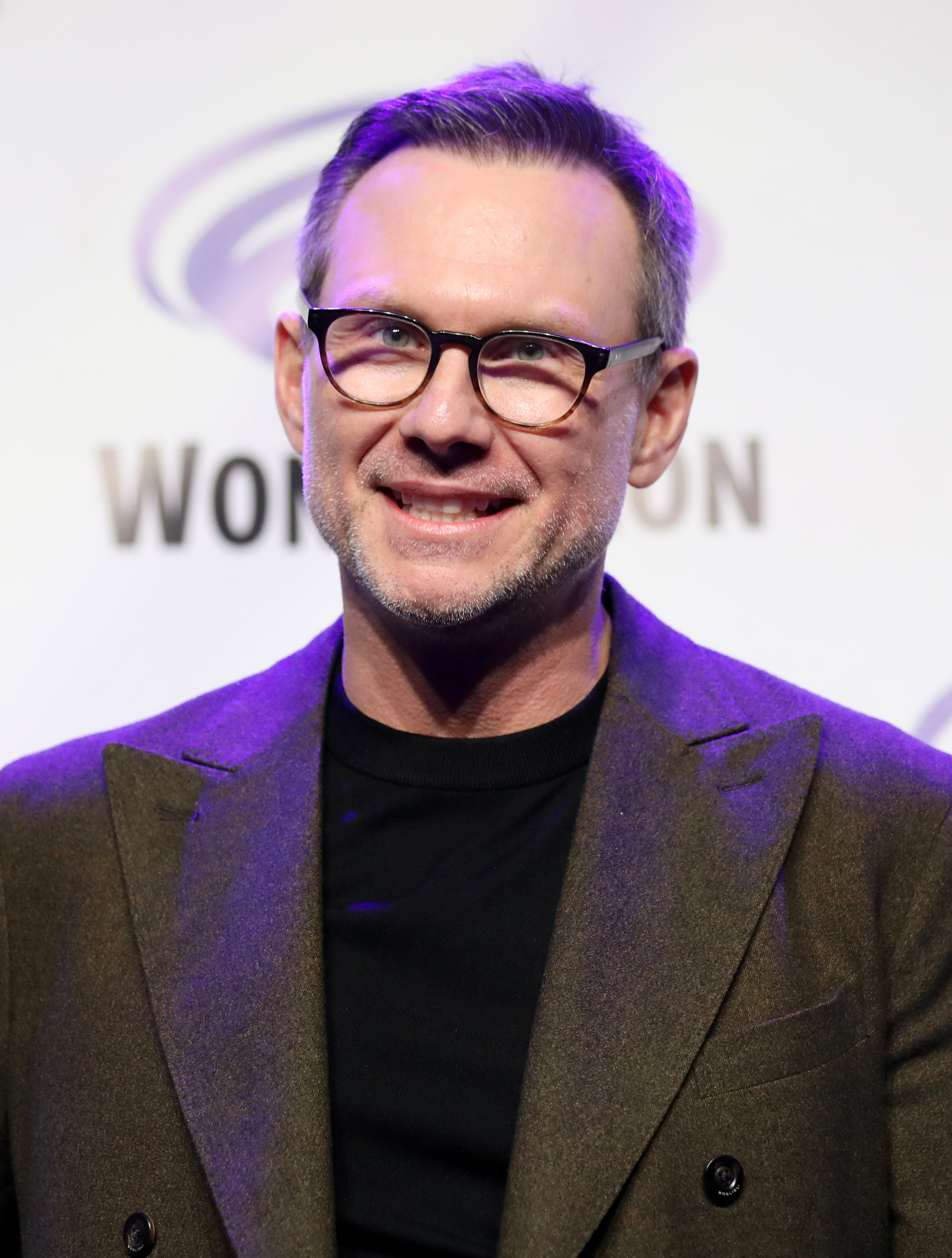
2024 winner Christian Slater.

Year	Actor	Role	Program	Network	Refs
2022 (1st)
2022 (1st)	Kit Connor	Nick Nelson	Heartstopper	Netflix	
2022 (1st)	Loretta Devine	M'Dear	Family Reunion	Netflix	
2022 (1st)	Mark Feuerstein	Watson Brewer	The Baby-Sitters Club	Netflix	
2022 (1st)	Joe Locke	Charlie Spring	Heartstopper	Netflix	
2022 (1st)	Alicia Silverstone	Elizabeth Thomas-Brewer	The Baby-Sitters Club	Netflix	
2022 (1st)	Rueby Wood	Nate	Better Nate Than Ever	Disney+	
2023 (2nd)
2023 (2nd)	Tony Hale	Mr. Benedict	The Mysterious Benedict Society	Disney+	
2023 (2nd)	Tim Allen	Scott Calvin/Santa	The Santa Clauses	Disney+	
2023 (2nd)	Ella Bright	Darrell Rivers	Malory Towers	BYU TV	
2023 (2nd)	Veda Cienfuegos	Emily	Circuit Breakers	Apple TV+	
2023 (2nd)	Gina Rodriguez	Momma	Lost Ollie	Netflix	
2024 (3rd)
2024 (3rd)	Christian Slater	Mulgarath	The Spiderwick Chronicles	The Roku Channel	
2024 (3rd)	Lola Blue	Addie Darrow	A Kind of Spark	BYU TV	
2024 (3rd)	Ella Bright	Darrell Rivers	Malory Towers	BYU TV	
2024 (3rd)	Justin Long	Mr. Bratt	Goosebumps	Disney+	
2024 (3rd)	Raven-Symoné	Raven Baxter	Raven's Home	Disney Channel	
2025 (4th)
2025 (4th)	Joe Locke	Charlie Spring	Heartstopper	Netflix	
2025 (4th)	Kit Connor	Nick Nelson	Heartstopper	Netflix	
2025 (4th)	Danya Griver	Gwendoline Mary Lacy	Malory Towers	BYUtv	
2025 (4th)	Lisa Kudrow	Penelope	Time Bandits	Apple TV+	
2025 (4th)	Jude Law	Jod Na Nawood	Star Wars: Skeleton Crew	Disney+	
2025 (4th)	David Schwimmer	Anthony Brewer	Goosebumps: The Vanishing	Disney+	
2025 (4th)	Nina Toussaint-White	Sarah Robinson	The Primrose Railway Children	BYUtv	

== Performers with multiple nominations ==
2 nominations

- Ella Bright
- Kit Connor
- Joe Locke

== Programs with multiple nominations ==
4 nominations

- Heartstopper

3 nominations

- Malory Towers

2 nominations

- The Baby-Sitters Club

== Networks with multiple nominations ==
8 nominations

- Netflix

7 nominations

- Disney+/Disney Channel

5 nominations

- BYUtv

2 nominations

- Apple TV+

== Superlatives ==
Superlative	Performer	Program	Year	Age
Oldest Nominee	Loretta Devine	Family Reunion	2022	73
Youngest Nominee	Rueby Wood	Better Nate Than Ever	2022	15
