= Jenny Walser =

English actress

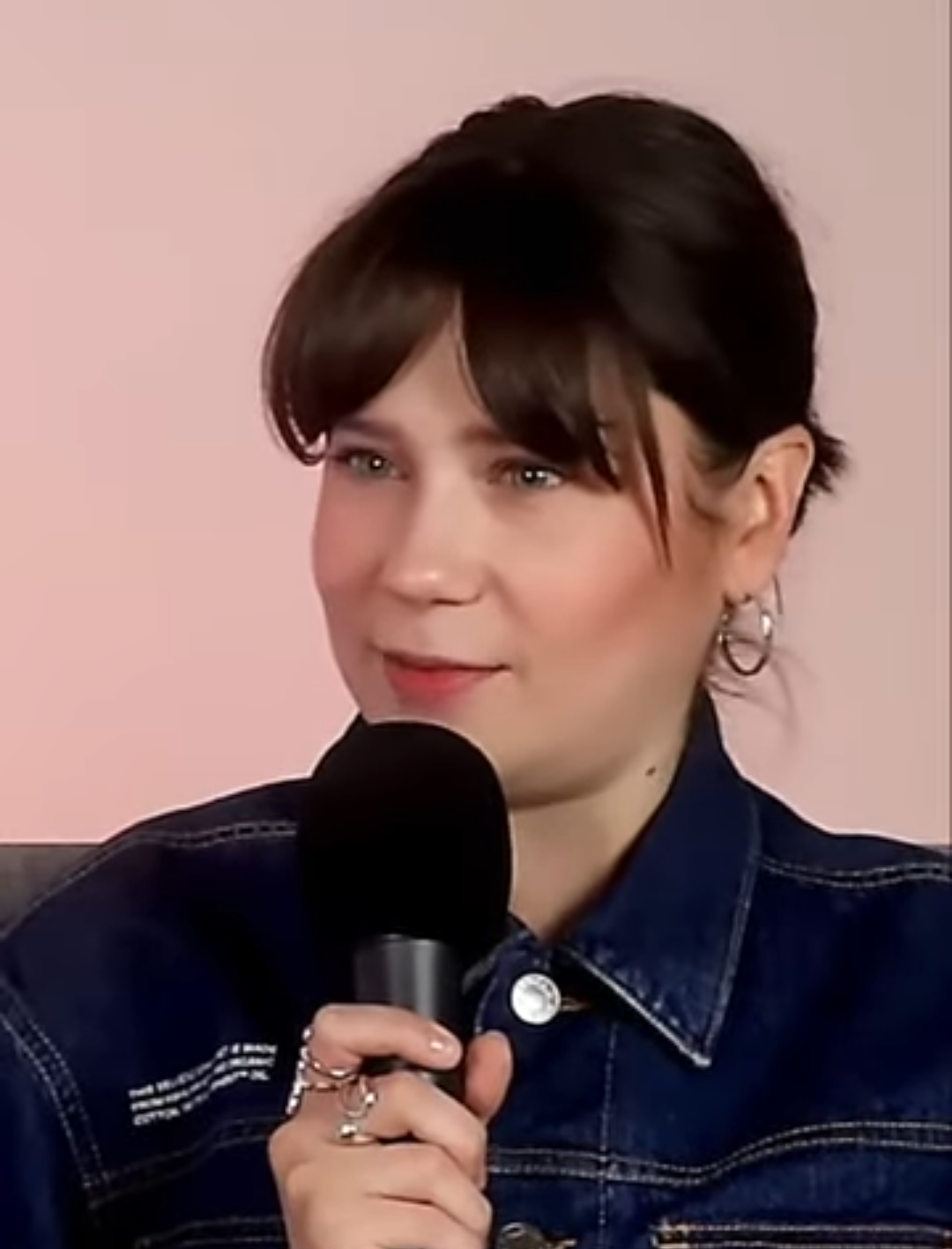
- Walser in 2024
- Born: May 1, 1995 (age 31); London, England
- Education: Durham University
- Occupation: actress

Jenny Walser (born 1995 or 1996) is an English actress. She is known for her role as Tori Spring in the coming-of-age romantic comedy-drama television series Heartstopper.

== Early life and education ==
Jenny Walser was born in Westminster, London, in 1995 or 1996.

She trained in dance, studying at the Rona Hart School of Dance and performed with the Royal Academy of Dramatic Arts youth company. She earned a natural science degree from Durham University in 2016.

== Career ==
Walser began her career acting in theatre productions. She performed with the National Youth Theatre REP company. In 2021, she made her television debut as Louise Wrigley in the period drama series Call the Midwife. In 2022, she joined the cast of the coming-of-age romantic comedy-drama series Heartstopper as Tori Spring, the elder sister of Charlie Spring.

In 2024, she played the role of Zofia, an American tourist whose mysterious death leads to an investigation, in the German television mini-series The Next Level.

She reprised her role as Tori Spring in the television film Heartstopper Forever, which was released in 2026.

== Personal life ==
Walser is queer. She has described feeling seen by the film Matthias & Maxime and watching it many times early in the COVID-19 pandemic while "working out my own queerness and my identity," referring to the film as "Incredible cinema."

== Filmography ==
=== Television ===
| Year | Title | Role | Notes |
|---|---|---|---|
| 2021 | Call the Midwife | Louise Wrigley | 1 episode |
| 2022–2024 | Heartstopper | Tori Spring | Main role; 17 episodes |
| 2024 | The Next Level | Zofia | TV mini series |
| 2026 | Forever Home | Sally | Lead role |

=== Film ===
| Year | Title | Role |
|---|---|---|
| 2026 | Heartstopper Forever | Tori Spring |
