= Tobie Donovan =

English actor and vlogger

Tobie Donovan is an English actor and vlogger. He is known for his role as Isaac Henderson in the Netflix series Heartstopper (2022–2026).

== Life ==
Donovan is from Bath. He attended Ralph Allen School. He became interested in acting as a child and trained at the Bath Academy Theatre.

He originally intended to perform theatre before transitioning to film. He auditioned for the Netflix series Heartstopper via an open casting call. He was selected for the role of Isaac Henderson, who discovers he is asexual in the second season. During the production of the first season, Donovan kept a behind-the-scenes vlog on YouTube. In 2022, he received a Silver Play YouTube Creator Award for reaching 100,000 subscribers. Castmate Kit Connor gave Donovan a camera to help continue the vlogs. In season two, his character shares scenes with James McEwan, played by Bradley Riches.

Between seasons one and two of Heartstopper, Donovan acted in Paper Cut at the Park Theatre.
