= Radio Silence (novel) =

2016 novel by Alice Oseman

- Author: Alice Oseman
- Language: English
- Genre: Young adult
- Publisher: HarperCollins
- Publication date: February 25, 2016 (UK); December 26, 2023 (US)
- ISBN: 978-0007559251

Radio Silence is a 2016 novel by Alice Oseman. It focuses on high schooler Frances Janvier, who befriends Aled Last, the creator of her favorite podcast, and must find a way to reconcile with him after his identity is exposed to the public.

== Plot ==
Frances Janvier, an overachieving high schooler aiming to attend the University of Cambridge, is secretly a fan art creator for the popular podcast Universe City. One day, the podcast's anonymous creator contacts her to create official artwork for the show, and she learns their identity is Aled Last, her longtime neighbor and the estranged twin brother of her former crush Carys. The two bond over the show over the coming months, but when Aled is outed as Universe City's creator, he leaves for university and refuses all contact from Frances and his other friends, causing Frances to question her goals in life and seek out a way to restore her and Aled's friendship.

== Characters ==
- Frances Janvier, a seventeen-year-old student single-mindedly focused on getting into the University of Cambridge, and a fan-turned-official artist for Universe City. She is bisexual and biracial, having a British-Ethiopian father and a white mother.
- Aled Last, the anonymous creator of Universe City. He is both gay and demisexual. A younger version of Aled is a supporting character in Oseman's webcomic and graphic novel series Heartstopper, though he is replaced by a new character, Isaac, in the television adaption.
- Daniel Jun, Aled's boyfriend.
- Raine, a friend of Frances.
- Carys Last, Aled's twin sister and Frances' crush. She ran away from home before the events of the novel and has not been in contact with Aled or Frances since.

== Development ==
Frances' arc in the book was inspired by Oseman's own experiences with academia. Oseman has also cited a desire for asexual representation as an inspiration for the work.

== Reception ==
Kirkus Reviews positively remarked on the relationship between Frances and Aled and the themes of gender, race, and class, though the reviewer felt that the plot lagged at times, concluding that the book was "a smart, timely outing."

justonemorepage of The Guardian commented favourably on the diverse cast, giving particular attention to the asexual representation, and the book's handling of serious subject matter.

Publishers Weekly gave Radio Silence a starred review, describing Frances' narration as having a "honest, insecure, and occasionally meandering" tone and stating the book showed how "the world and its technologies offer opportunities for connection" and how "fulfillment [can] go far beyond traditional definitions of success." It received a second starred review from Booklist, with Anne O’Malley writing "this story stands alone and features believable characters in a unique setting."

The book was also reviewed in The Bulletin of the Center for Children's Books.

Radio Silence won a Silver Inky Award in 2017.
