= Heartstopper (graphic novel) =

British webcomic and graphic novel series by Alice Oseman

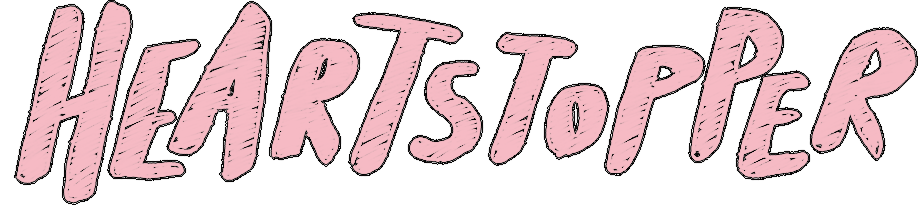
- Date: 2016 (Tapas webcomic); 2018 (Kickstarter print run)
- Page count: 2,017 pages
- Publisher: Self-published; Print: Hachette Children's Group

Creative team
- Creator: Alice Oseman
- ISBN: 978-1-4449-5138-7

Heartstopper is a British coming-of-age webcomic and graphic novel series written and illustrated by Alice Oseman. It tells the story of Nick Nelson and Charlie Spring, two teenage boys who meet at school and fall in love. The series explores themes including romance, friendship, coming out, identity and mental health.

Oseman began publishing Heartstopper online on Tumblr and Tapas in 2016, before a successful Kickstarter campaign funded a print edition in 2018. The series was later published in print by Hachette Children's Group. Nick and Charlie had previously appeared in Oseman's 2014 novel Solitaire. Oseman later revisited and expanded their story in Heartstopper, alongside the 2015 novella Nick and Charlie. The final panels in the series were released in April 2026, with the sixth and final volume being published on 2 July 2026.

Heartstopper received critical acclaim for its gentle tone, inclusive cast and portrayal of LGBTQ youth, and became a commercial success. It was adapted into the Netflix television series Heartstopper, which premiered in 2022 and was also written by Oseman. The series has also been the subject of book challenges and restrictions in several countries because of its LGBTQ content.

== Premise ==
Heartstopper tells the story of Charlie Spring and Nick Nelson, two British teenage boys who attend the fictional Truham Grammar School in Kent, as they meet and fall in love. The series explores teen LGBTQ romance and coming out, as well as mental health and sex in later installments. The story also follows the lives and relationships of Nick and Charlie's friends, many of whom are LGBTQ themselves.

== Characters ==
=== Main ===
- Nick Nelson, a popular Year 11 rugby player at Truham Grammar School seated next to Charlie in form class who later realizes he is bisexual
- Charlie Spring, a Year 10 student at Truham Grammar School who was recently outed as gay
- Tao Xu, Charlie's best friend and later Elle's boyfriend
- Elle Argent, Charlie's close friend and later Tao's girlfriend who transferred to Higgs Girls School after coming out as transgender
- Tara Jones, Nick's lesbian childhood friend who becomes his confidante when he starts to explore his sexuality. She is Darcy's girlfriend
- Darcy Olsson, Tara's extroverted partner with a complex family life. They start using they/them pronouns in Volume 6
- Aled Last, Charlie's gay demisexual close friend and one of the main characters in Oseman's novel Radio Silence
- Sahar Zahid, the group's new friend who starts sixth form at the same time as Nick

=== Supporting ===
- Tori Spring, Charlie's asexual aro-spec older sister and the main character in Oseman's debut novel Solitaire
- Ben Hope, a closeted, bisexual student whom Charlie was initially in a secret, toxic relationship with
- Harry Greene, a homophobic bully and member of the school's rugby team
- Sarah Nelson, Nick's supportive mother. She is divorced from her sons' father, Stéphane Fournier
- Oliver Spring, Charlie and Tori's younger brother
- Jane Spring, Charlie's mother
- Julio Spring, Charlie's father
- David Nelson, Nick's entitled older brother who denies Nick's sexuality
- Michael Holden, Tori's boyfriend
- Nellie Nelson, Nick's first dog, a Border Collie
- Henry Nelson, Nick's second dog, a pug

== Development and release ==
The characters of Nick Nelson and Charlie Spring first appeared in supporting roles in Oseman's debut novel Solitaire (2014) which features Charlie's sister, Tori, as the protagonist. Oseman "fell in love" with the couple while writing the novel and decided that she needed to tell their story. She initially released the e-book novellas Nick and Charlie and This Winter featuring the characters in 2015, but eventually realised that their story needed an episodic structure that was more suited to a webcomic or graphic novel format.

Oseman started publishing Heartstopper as a webcomic on Tumblr and Tapas in September 2016 and on Webtoon in August 2019. New panels were usually posted three times a month and illustrated by Oseman herself. The final panel was released on 1 April 2026, followed by a two-part epilogue on 11 April. Additionally, Oseman published short stories focusing on supporting characters, provided illustrations for annual Q&A posts and invited other illustrators to contribute their own Heartstopper-inspired webcomics whenever the main story was on a pause.

The webcomic gained a significant following, leading Oseman to launch a Kickstarter campaign to help fund the publication of a graphic novel covering the first two chapters of the series (retroactively Volume 1) on 20 June 2018. The targeted pledge was reached within two hours. In October 2018, Hachette Children's Group (HCG) acquired the rights to physical publishing of the first two volumes of Heartstopper, and by January 2019, the third and fourth volumes. They were released on 7 February and 11 July 2019, 6 February 2020 and 6 May 2021, respectively. Volume 5 was later released on 7 December 2023 and the sixth and final volume on 2 July 2026. Additionally, a Heartstopper-themed colouring book was published on 11 June 2020, followed by The Heartstopper Yearbook on 13 October 2022.

== Releases ==
=== Webcomic ===
Chapter no.	Title	Post count	First published	Last published
1	"Meet"	12	1 September 2016	11 February 2017
2	"Crush"	20	21 February 2017	26 August 2017
3	"Kiss"	36	1 September 2017	11 September 2018
4	"Out"	42	1 October 2018	21 January 2020
5	"Love"	26	11 February 2020	11 November 2020
6	"Journey"	16	1 December 2020	11 June 2021
7	"Together"	40	1 January 2022	21 December 2023
8	"Forever"	51	1 October 2024	1 April 2026
Epilogue		2	11 April 2026	

=== Volumes ===
No.	Title	Content included	Publication date	Publisher	ISBN
1	Volume 1	Chapters 1–2	7 February 2019	Hachette Children's Group	9781444951387
2	Volume 2	Chapter 3	11 July 2019	Hachette Children's Group	9781444951400
3	Volume 3	Chapter 4	6 February 2020	Hachette Children's Group	9781444952773
4	Volume 4	Chapters 5–6	6 May 2021	Hachette Children's Group	9781444952797
5	Volume 5	Chapter 7	7 December 2023	Hachette Children's Group	9781444957655
6	Volume 6	Chapter 8; epilogue	2 July 2026	Hachette Children's Group	9781444974881

=== Related books ===
Title	Publication date	Publisher	ISBN
The Heartstopper Colouring Book	11 June 2020	Hachette Children's Group	9781444958775
The Heartstopper Yearbook	13 October 2022	Hachette Children's Group	9781444968392

== Reception ==
Writing for The National, Gemma McLaughlin praised the novels for being able to "capture the attention" through "the small stories that make up life" rather than plot twists and heavy drama. She called the story "infinitely welcoming with characters that seem like real life friends", singling out Charlie as "extremely likeable" and praising the novels' treatment of his mental health. Publishers Weekly said that the novels' "leisurely pace and focus on everyday events ... allows the characters' relationship to develop in a natural, relatable way" and stated that the art style complemented the tone of the story. Imogen Russell Williams in The Times Literary Supplement called Oseman's illustration style "loose and flowing" and said of the novels that they "[engage] directly with shame, fear and anxiety, bringing them sweetly into the light". The A.V. Club included the webcomic on its list of "The best comics of 2018", with Caitlin Rosberg saying that it is "best defined by its kindness both to the characters and the reader". Metaphrog also included the comic on The Herald's 2019 list of "The best comics and graphic novels of the year as chosen by comic creators".

Terri Schlichenmeyer of the Washington Blade described Volume One of the novels as "one really sweet book" and praised the understanding treatment of characters struggling with their sexuality. She also felt that the realism of the novel was strengthened by the inclusion of bully characters. Kirkus Reviews stated that the placement of panels and their bordering in Volume One "prevent the visual graphics from going aesthetically stale" and that the hand-written lettering reinforced the story's human tone. They summarised the novel as "An adorable diary of love's gut punches". Summer Hayes reviewed Volume One in Booklist and praised Oseman's use of wordless panels to portray characters' emotions, although she felt that the illustrations were inconsistent. Overall, she concludes that "the romance and realistic fiction will draw readers into this sweet story". Kelley Gile reviewed Volume One in the School Library Journal, praising the dialogue, detailed facial expressions in the art, and "a font that mimics handwriting [that adds] to the adorkability factor".

Alaine Martaus also reviewed Volume One in The Bulletin of the Center for Children's Books in which she praised the "simple drawings" which she says "keep much of the focus on faces and phones, reinforcing a deeply interpersonal connection at the heart of the story". She described the story as being composed of "a series of charming vignettes". In a further review of Volume Two, Martaus reiterated her previous comments and said that the storytelling of the second volume "moves effortlessly from tearful poignance to laugh-worthy moments to stirring romance". Kirkus Reviews said of Volume Two that it retained the "distinctive style" of illustrations present in the first volume and that its transitions between panels were "creative" and "add creative flair". It praised the characters and described the story as "Incredibly lovable from start to finish". Sarah Rice reviewed Volume Two in Booklist and felt that Nick and Charlie's relationship was presented in a "heartfelt, gentle way" and praised the "loose art style [that] is full of lovely details, such as embarrassment and romantic blush lines".

In a review of Volume Two, Tiffany Babb of The A.V. Club praised the book's reproduction of the webcomic's art, its use of white space, and Oseman's handwritten lettering, which she says is "expressive ... in a way that feels both unique to her style and organic to the pacing of the comic". She felt that the treatment of Charlie and Nick's characters displayed "a level of understanding and care that elevates the story" and argued that the story "never devalued or ignored" the characters' other relationships with friends and family. Sarah Hughes of i included Volume Three in the newspaper's list of "Young Adult fiction: 25 of the best new books for 2020". Prudence Wade rated Volume Four 8/10 for The Independent and called it "a touching tale of teen love and accepting who you are". Fiona Noble also included Volume Four in The Guardian's list of "The best children's books of 2021", describing it as a "joyful, tender look at first love and relationships with an inclusive cast".

The webcomic series has received more than 52 million views and the novel has sold more than one million copies worldwide.

=== Restrictions and bans ===
In September 2021, Turkey's Ministry of Family, Labor and Social Services labeled the publication "harmful" concluding that "some elements in the books might have harmful effects on the morality of those aged below 18." Following this decision, copies of the books are only allowed to be sold inside of sealed envelopes with the label "Harmful for children" in Turkey.

In 2023, the Heartstopper novels increasingly became the subject of a wave of U.S. restrictions against books featuring people of color, racism, gender identity and/or queer individuals. The books were pulled from shelves in at least two school districts, Clay County, Florida and Canby, Oregon.

In July 2023, a Hungarian bookstore was fined 12 million forints (then approximately US$35,900) for displaying the book without packaging. Hungary passed a law in 2021 requiring books containing any homosexual or transgender content to be sold in closed packaging only. Oseman responded to the decision, commenting, "Queer young people deserve to see themselves in literature. Queerness is not inappropriate [sic] for kids".

In August 2023, the novels were temporarily pulled from shelves in the Marion County, Mississippi library system pending review by its board of supervisors following complaints of their LGBTQ themes and inclusion of boys kissing.

=== Accolades ===
Year	Award	Category	Nominee(s)	Results
2019	Goodreads Choice Awards	Best Graphic Novels & Comics	Heartstopper: Volume 2	Nominated
2020	Goodreads Choice Awards	Best Graphic Novels & Comics	Heartstopper: Volume 3	Won
2020	British Book Awards	Children's Illustrated and Non-fiction	Heartstopper: Volume 1	Nominated
2022	Books Are My Bag Readers' Awards	Readers' Choice	Heartstopper	Won
2022	Book Shimmy Awards	Graphic Novel	Heartstopper: Volume 4	Pending
2022	British Book Awards	Children's Illustrated Book of the Year	Heartstopper: Volume 4	Nominated
2022	Goodreads Choice Awards	Best Graphic Novels & Comics	Heartstopper: Volume 4	Won
2022	Waterstones Book of the Year	Book of the Year	Heartstopper: Volume 1	Nominated
2023	British Book Awards	Children's Illustrated Book of the Year	The Heartstopper Yearbook	Nominated
2023	TikTok Book Awards	Best Book I Wish I Could Read Again for the First Time	Heartstopper: Volume 1	Won
2023	GLAAD Media Awards	Outstanding Graphic Novel/Anthology	Heartstopper: Volume 4	Nominated
2024	GLAAD Media Awards	Outstanding Graphic Novel/Anthology	Heartstopper: Volume 5	Nominated
2024	British Book Awards	Children's Illustrated Book of the Year	Heartstopper: Volume 5	Nominated
2024	Goodreads Choice Awards	Best Young Adult Fiction	Heartstopper: Volume 5	Won

== Netflix adaptation ==
A television adaptation of Heartstopper entered development after See-Saw Films acquired the rights in July 2019. Production was greenlit in January 2021 by the streaming service Netflix as an eight-episode series written by Oseman and starring Kit Connor and Joe Locke as Nick and Charlie, respectively. The first season was released on 22 April 2022, the second on 3 August 2023 and the third on 3 October 2024. Since its premiere, the series has received high viewership, critical acclaim and numerous accolades.

As a tie-in to the series' premiere, the first volume of the graphic novel was re-released on 28 April 2022 with an excerpt of the show's script and new cover art featuring Connor and Locke as Nick and Charlie recreating the original illustrated cover. The graphic novel became the top-selling children's book in the UK following the popularity of the Netflix series.

On 22 April 2025, it was announced that the Netflix series would conclude with a feature film instead of a fourth season. Written by Oseman, it is based on the sixth and final volume of the graphic novel series. Connor and Locke also served as executive producers alongside Oseman. Production began on 9 June 2025. It was released on Netflix on 17 July 2026.
