= Solitaire (Oseman novel) =

2014 novel by Alice Oseman

- Author: Alice Oseman
- Language: English
- Genre: Young adult
- Publisher: HarperCollins (UK); HarperTeen (US); Scholastic, Inc. (US)
- Publication date: July 31, 2014 (UK); 2015 (US)
- ISBN: 9780007559220

Solitaire is a 2014 novel by Alice Oseman. It deals with Tori Spring, a sixteen-year-old struggling with depression, who finds herself uncovering the conspiracy behind a mysterious organization called Solitaire, which is playing dangerous pranks at her school.

== Plot ==
Victoria "Tori" Spring, a sixth former at Harvey Greene Grammar School, also known as "Higgs", deals with depression worsened by struggles over her brother Charlie's outing and subsequent suicide attempt and eating disorder. As the school year starts, a mysterious online group known as Solitaire starts playing pranks at Higgs. They start off small and harmless, but gradually become more elaborate and begin putting people at risk. When Tori starts noticing patterns between the pranks and events from her past, she begrudgingly teams up with Michael Holden, a strange and unyieldingly optimistic new boy determined both to befriend Tori and uncover Solitaire's secrets, to unmask the people behind Solitaire and discover their motivations.

Charlie and his boyfriend Nick, who go on to be the protagonists of Oseman’s webcomic Heartstopper, are supporting characters in this novel. Additionally, Tori and Michael are supporting characters in Heartstopper.

== Release ==
Oseman wrote Solitaire when she was 17, and the book was published when she was 19.

== Reception ==
jboo1698 of The Guardian positively commented on the cast, saying "Oseman has created characters that really punctuate the plot," as well as the avoidance of a traditional "boy meets girl" plotline, but criticized the limited exploration into the Solitaire organization's members.

Kirkus Reviews criticized Tori, finding her to be unlikable, concluding that "still, Oseman’s novel will be popular with those who worship Holden [Caulfield]."

Publishers Weekly described the book's climax as "chaotic and predictable", further saying that "Oseman proves herself a clever, witty writer, and she effectively shows how angry or sad 'nice' teens can be".

Cary Frostick of School Library Journal said the book "opens a frightening window onto life as a teen in today's world, summed up by Tori's sardonic remark, 'It's funny because it's true.'", and called it a "fascinating debut from an author to watch".

Gemma E McLaughlin, writing for The National, praised the relationship between Tori and Michael, stating that it was "about what they teach each other, which is worth more to both of them than romance".
