= Max Hovey =

British influencer and activist (born 1998 or 1999)

- Hovey in 2025
- Born: 1998 or 1999 (age 27–28)
- Occupations: Blogger; content creator; activist; author; content creator; intimacy educator
- Years active: 2010s–present
- Works: No Fats, No Fems: A Guide to Queer Empathy and Unpacking Prejudice

Max Hovey (born 1998 or 1999) is a British influencer, content creator, writer and LGBTQ+ activist and intimacy educator. He has used his platform to raise awareness of LGBTQ+ issues such as mental health, body image and acceptance and sex positivity. He set up the mental health blog Happy Smiley and has also written for various publications. His debut book, No Fats, No Fems: A Guide to Queer Empathy and Unpacking Prejudice, was released in 2026. Hovey's work has been praised and he was one of the "100 LGBTQ trailblazers" highlighted in Attitude in 2021.

== Life and career ==
Max Hovey was born in 1998 or 1999. He described the English town he grew up in as being small, conservative and predominantly white. He has spoken about feeling lonely as a queer person in a small town and how it makes dating difficult. Hovey enjoyed writing and when he was about six years old, Hovey's mother made him aware that he had a really "strong sense of right and wrong". As of 2026, he is based in London. He has struggled with mental health issues. He studied a full-time course in "Media and Communications" at university whilst beginning his blog and social media work. He found the workload of managing both difficult, but believed that the modules he was taking were helping his career.

Hovey identifies as queer. He struggled with facing some homophobic abuse online, and when he posted a photo of him wearing earrings, he was unfollowed by a large amount of people despite receiving a good reception from many of his followers. In the 2010s, Hovey began the blog Happy Smiley initially as a personal blog where he could dedicate his mental health activism, as opposed to his Instagram profile where he also wanted to show his other interests and parts of his personality. Happy Smiley turned into a community blog and reached thirty featured writers in 2020; the blog was initially called Our Happy Place but had to be renamed due to legal reasons. Of the blog, Hovey said that he wanted to create a supportive online place and that he was proud that he had turned his blog into "a community of diverse voices and stories.""

Hovey has used his platform to speak about issues affecting the LGBTQIA+ community, including awareness of mental health, body image and acceptance and sex positivity. When Hovey finished sixth form at 18 years old, his Instagram profile became popular due to his pictures; however, he later reflected that he felt that the profile was a "lie" and that he started editing his pictures as he was comparing himself to others. Hovey has said, "Every single image was face-tuned within an inch of its life, and it haunts me to this day. I was so unsatisfied with myself and felt I would never achieve the image that so many influencers were projecting, that I just chose to edit it, even my body. But, I loved it. I loved the attention, I was finally being accepted and wanted; it became like a drug. Turns out I didn't love it — I was addicted to it." His constant worrying about his appearance and engagement on his profile created mental health and confidence issues for Hovey, but he felt too insecure to stop editing his pictures despite hating doing so. He recalled that it was the most depressing time of his life as he felt that his entire existence was focused on how others viewed him.

"I knew I wanted it to be something important, something meaningful and something rarely discussed in depth, but I just didn't know where to start as there is so much for us [LGBTQ+ people] to unpack as a community. Then the title just came to me. NO FATS, NO FEMS. It was punchy, it was controversial and it got people's attention. More importantly, the contents of the book was going to be made pretty clear by it. As soon as I had the title, the rest of the book followed."

— Hovey on how he wrote his debut book (2026)

During the COVID-19 pandemic, he stopped editing his pictures as he realised that he was perpetuating the things he was insecure about online, explaining, "I was indirectly making other people's insecurities worse by making myself look so 'perfect'". This led to Hovey losing thousands of followers and receiving messages criticising him, which initially made him feel "unwanted and disgusting". In 2021, Hovey said, "I remind myself that my physical image doesn't define me. The way I look should in no way be correlated with my happiness... My physical appearance should not determine my overall happiness and life satisfaction." Having initially started using Instagram to receive validation for his personal insecurities, his profile grew when he began posting more positive content and focusing on mental health activism. He said of this, "When I wanted it for the wrong reasons, nothing was happening, and then when I just detached myself completely, it happens." He believed that his authenticity drew people in as opposed to his initial posts showing a "façade". As of July 2021, he had 125,000 followers on Instagram.

Hovey's debut book, No Fats, No Fems: A Guide to Queer Empathy and Unpacking Prejudice, was released on 19 May 2026. The book examines prejudices around gender expression, race, body image, ableism and bisexuality within the LGBTQ+ community and includes academic research and interviews with 21 queer people, including people of colour and a Muslim non-binary person from Pakistan, as well people who identified as transgender, non-binary, lesbian and bisexual. The title of the book refers to a phrase common on gay dating and hookup apps, and he said that he wanted the title to be controversial to draw attention, saying, "If one person has their attention hooked and their mind changed, I've done my job." The book took three years to complete; Hovey first thought of the title of the book before anything else and he then signed with a literary agent. The book was rejected by publishers around 60 times before an editor, who had followed Hovey's social media for years, discovered the proposal on an industry website and reached out to Hovey, and a deal then was made. Hovey insisted on working with a queer editor, which his agent initially doubted was possible.

Hovey believed that everyone could learn something from the book, and cited two older heterosexual women who told him that the book had given them a new understanding of people they had not previously understood. Hovey was aware that the book could not cover all queer identity and noted that his fear of leaving someone out was the most vulnerable part of releasing the book. Of the themes in the book, Hovey said that he once had the several of the mindsets that he discusses in the book, adding, "I'm not saying you're a terrible person; I'm saying this is a thought process you may have, and it's not your fault, but refusing to acknowledge and unpack it is still your responsibility." He spoke a lot of his personal experiences in the book. Hovey went to several events to promote the book, including giving a talk at a Waterstones shop in Swansea and going to Queer Britain.

Hovey's writing and work has been included in various outlets, including GQ, The Independent, Scene, Attitude and Bustle. He said in 2026 that he hopes to write more books, explaining, "I want to be a writer, it's the one place I can formulate my views in an unfiltered and unrestricted way." Hovey is also the founder of Climax and films videos teaching people about LGBTQ+ sex education. He has also dubbed himself as a "big boy advocate".

== Views ==
Hovey has spoken about fetishisation and sexualisation in the LGBTQ+ community. He has also criticised the lack of representation for queer people, especially men, "We never see feminine black men represented desirably, we rarely see plus size white men, let alone POCs, represented desirably. When we don't see ourselves represented it's hard to feel like we belong, it's hard to feel that others find us desirable". Hovey has also called biphobia within the LGBTQ+ community "absolutely horrific" and has referenced the androcentric desire hypothesis, which theorises that many people assume that bisexual people have a higher attraction to men. He has also criticised the ostracization of people who make minor mistakes, saying, "We preach imperfection and tolerance, but [..] We don't give people the grace and patience to learn." Hovey said in a 2020 interview that "sex work is work" and acknowledged issues that sex workers face. He supports Black Lives Matter. In 2021, Hovey discussed the importance of self-love in Attitude's annual Body issue.

In 2022, Hovey praised the LGBTQ+ television series Heartstopper for positively representing several LGBTQ+ identities and not just showing the "trauma" of LGBTQ+ people; he hoped that the show would help people accept who they "are truly born to be" and believed the show had been able to "shine a light on the joy, love and happiness that can come with being queer." The following year, Hovey criticised the LGBTQ online hookup application Grindr for not doing enough to prevent cyberflashing and set up a petition calling on the app to do so; he wrote in The Independent, "I am a sex-positive advocate and queer activist. I partake in casual sex regularly via the app and think the concept of it comes with a lot of outdated stigmas. That said, irrespective of whether the app I use is known for casual hookups, it does not mean I automatically consent to seeing everyone's genitalia". Hovey praised the 2025 film Pillion for showcasing "the less sanitised parts of queer culture", explaining, "To see the grittier, more raw and realistic parts of queer culture, specifically kink culture, was refreshing." He related to several things of the film and also praised the film's "striking portrait" of how difficult dating can be for LGBTQ people and the loneliness related to that.

== Reception and public image ==
Hovey has been noted for using his influence and platform to discuss body positivity.

In 2020, Jay Darcy from The Mancunion called Hovey one of his favourite Instagram users and said that "coming across Max's feel-good profile was just what I needed!". He also called Hovey the "antithesis of the superficial, performative nature of social media". He also praised Hovey's honesty online about how he is feeling in contrast to other social media users who only show the positive aspects of their lives. The following year, Hovey was one of the "100 LGBTQ trailblazers" highlighted in Attitude; he was featured in the "Third Sector and Community" sector. Hovey was noted for using his influence and platform to discuss body positivity and LGBTQ+ issues in addition to mental health, and that his Happy Smiley blog hoped "to turn frowns upside-down and encourage people to make the world a better place, one story at a time". Thomas Stichbury from the magazine wrote, "Keen to (ahem) Max-imise his potential in 2022, the writer and activist wants to normalise conversations around sexual wellness and be a sex-positive voice for the queer community." Dale Malita from Scene opined that Hovey one of the most "unfiltered voices in queer spaces right now".

Kelsey Minor from 1 Minute Critic praised Hovey's debut book, writing, "I found the book a compelling examination of the biases that can persist even within communities built around inclusion. Hovey challenges the idea that "preferences" in dating exist in a social vacuum." Minor opined that the book succeeded due to combining "social commentary with practical empathy", and she believed that the book was released at a "charged moment" due to a recent study showing that 85% of LGBTQ+ people of colour had faced race-based sexual discrimination online. She added, "Hovey's debut is a frank, empathetic reckoning with the biases queer communities perpetuate against their own. Uncomfortable where it needs to be, and generous where it counts". Malita from Scene wrote of the book "It's part manifesto, part reality check, taking on the exclusion, bias and internalised issues that still exist in queer communities and asking what it would really take to do better."

== Bibliography ==
- No Fats, No Fems: A Guide to Queer Empathy and Unpacking Prejudice (2026)
