= Alice Oseman =

English author (born 1994)

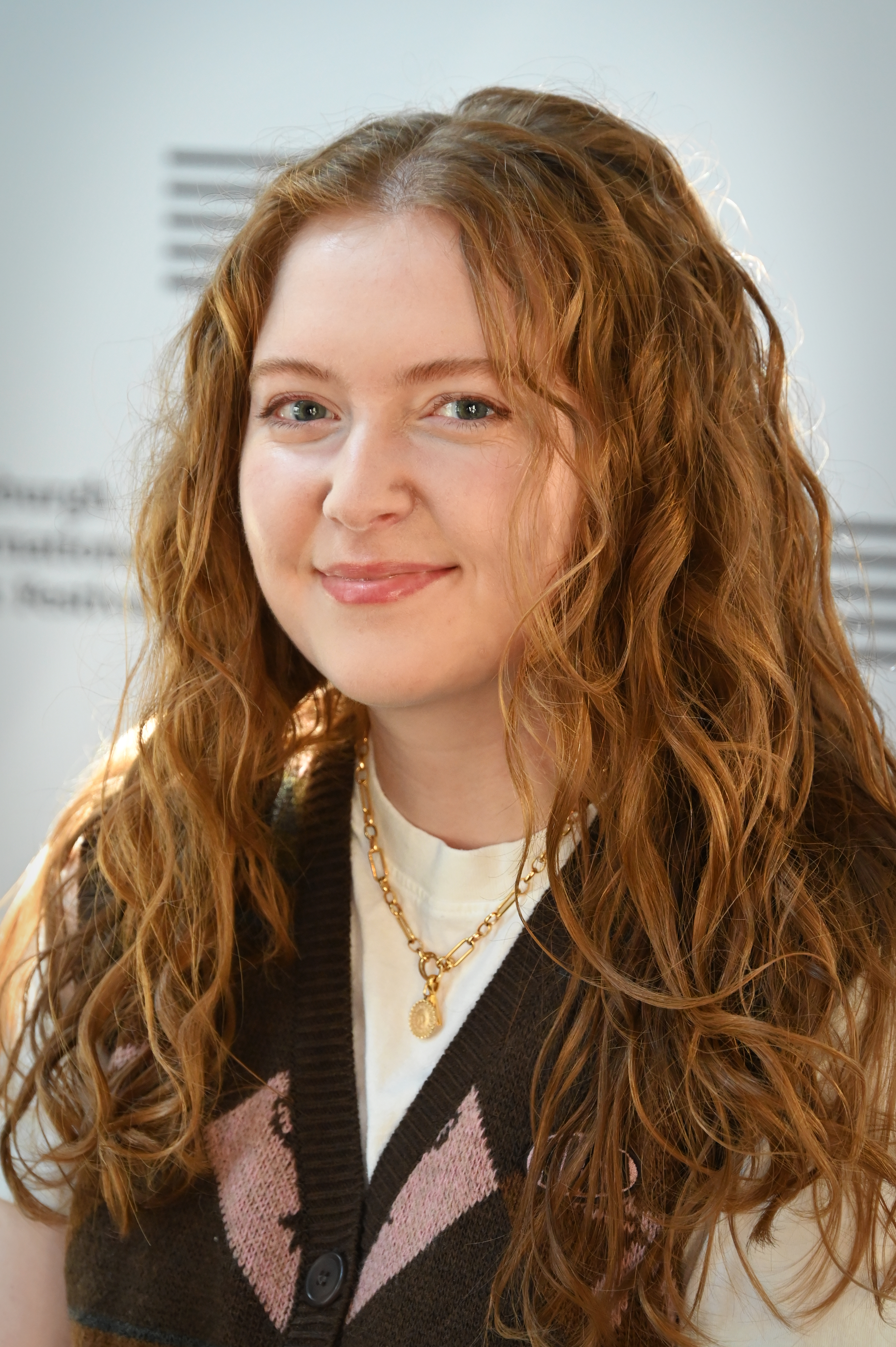
- Oseman in 2025
- Born: Alice May Oseman; 16 October 1994 (age 32); Chatham, Kent, England
- Education: Durham University (BA)
- Writing career
- Years active: 2014–present
- Genre: Young adult fiction
- Website: aliceoseman.com

Alice May Oseman (born 16 October 1994) is an English author and illustrator of young adult fiction. The third best-selling graphic novellist since records began, her (Note: Oseman uses she/her and they/them pronouns. This article uses she/her pronouns for consistency.) works explore contemporary teenage life in the UK and have received praise for their realism, LGBTQIA+ inclusion, and portrayal of mental health struggles. Her accolades include a British Book Award, three Children's and Family Emmy Awards, three Goodreads Choice Awards, and a Silver Inky Award. She was named to the BBC's 100 Women list in November 2023, and in October 2024. She was named to Time's Time100 Next list.

Oseman secured her first publishing deal at 17 and published her first novel Solitaire in 2014. Her novels include Radio Silence, I Was Born for This, and Loveless. She rose to widespread prominence for writing and illustrating the webcomic and graphic novel series Heartstopper from 2016 to 2026, which has been adapted into a critically acclaimed TV series (2022–2024) and film (2026).

== Early life and education ==
Alice Oseman was born on 16 October 1994 in Chatham, Kent and grew up in a village near Rochester, Kent with her younger brother, William, and attended Rochester Grammar School. She graduated with a Bachelor of Arts in English Literature from Durham University in 2016. In July 2024, Oseman received an honorary degree from the University of Kent at a Rochester Cathedral graduation ceremony for Doctors of Letters and Arts.

== Career ==
=== Debut with Solitaire and Radio Silence ===
Oseman wrote her debut novel Solitaire when she was 17 and secured a publishing deal for it by the time she was 19. It was published by HarperCollins in 2014 after a bidding war. The book follows the story of Tori Spring, a pessimistic teenager, as she meets Michael Holden, her polar opposite and an unbelievable optimist. They attempt to discover the truth behind the anonymous group 'Solitaire' who commit a series of pranks at their school. Other characters include Tori's brother Charlie, who has a severe eating disorder, and his boyfriend Nick. The novel explores themes such as friendship, depression, eating disorders, and LGBTQ+ relationships.

Solitaire was praised for its compelling characters and Oseman's young age at the time of publishing, landing her a BBC Breakfast interview on 22 July 2014. Oseman later published two ebook novellas based on characters from Solitaire: a sequel titled Nick and Charlie (July 2015) and a prequel titled This Winter (November 2015).

In 2016, Oseman published her second novel, Radio Silence. The novel follows Frances Janvier, a high-achiever whose life revolves around her admission to the University of Cambridge, who meets the shy creator behind her favourite podcast, Aled Last. Themes such as academic pressures and LGBT+ relationships and identities are central to the novel. Oseman noted that Frances' experience in Radio Silence was similar to her own school pressure and later disillusionment with academia following her education at Durham University.

The novel was praised for its compelling central character and realistic writing style and relatability, as well as for representing characters of various ethnicities, genders, and sexualities. Oseman has frequently commented about the importance of writing diversely and expressed regret over the lack of diversity in Solitaire. Radio Silence was named one of the Bank Street Children's Book Committee's Best Books of the Year in 2017 and won the 2017 Silver Inky Award for young adult literature.

=== Heartstopper and related media ===
Upon "falling in love" with the characters of Nick and Charlie, Oseman decided their story needed further exploration and began the Heartstopper online webcomic series. The episodic comic first appeared online on Tumblr and Tapas in September 2016 and follows Tori's younger brother Charlie through high school as he meets and then begins dating Nick Nelson. While the comic features some of the same characters and takes place in the same universe and timeline as Solitaire, its tone is notably different. Where Solitaire is a grimly realistic depiction of mental illness and struggle, Heartstopper provides a more uplifting view of the world and focuses much more on romance.

The comics have been hosted via Webtoon since August 2019. There are eight chapters available in full online, with the last page in the main story being published on April 1st, 2026. The epilogue, showing Nick & Charlie's life after the end of chapter eight, was released on April 11th 2026. In October 2018, Hachette Children's Group acquired the rights to physical publishing of the first two volumes of Heartstopper, and by January 2019, the third and fourth volumes. Volume 1 (including chapters 1 and 2) was published in October 2018, Volume 2 (chapter 3) in July 2019, Volume 3 (chapter 4) in February 2020, Volume 4 (chapters 5 and 6) in May 2021, Volume 5 (chapter 7) in December 2023, and Volume 6 (chapter 8 and an epilogue) in July 2026.

See-Saw Films optioned the television rights to Heartstopper in 2019. On 20 January 2021, it was revealed that a live-action television adaptation of Heartstopper was ordered to series by Netflix, with Oseman writing the script and Euros Lyn directing. Patrick Walters of See-Saw Films serves as executive producer. Kit Connor and Joe Locke star as Nick and Charlie respectively. It premiered on 22 April 2022, to critical acclaim with the first season receiving nine nominations and five wins, including Outstanding Young Teen Series, at the inaugural ceremony of the Children's and Family Emmy Awards. Oseman appears in a brief cameo in episode eight of season one.

On 20 May 2022, Netflix announced that the series was being recommissioned for a second and third season. Following the release of the series, the first volume of the Heartstopper graphic novel became the top-selling children's bestseller in the UK.

The show's second season was released on 3 August 2023 and received high praise for tackling more serious issues while maintaining the optimistic feel of the first season. Season 3 was released on 3 October 2024 and was similarly praised for further developing the show's themes and for its nuanced and respectful discussion of mental health and relationship struggles.

=== Continued success with coming-of-age novels ===
Oseman's third book, I Was Born for This, was published in May 2018. It follows the story of Angel Rahimi and Jimmy Kaga-Ricci who are, respectively, a massive fan and the lead singer of boy band The Ark. The book explores Fandom culture, obsession, and identity alongside Oseman's trademark depictions of teenage friendship, sexuality and gender, and mental illness. It was nominated for Best Young Adult Fiction Book in both the Goodreads Choice Awards and The Bookseller Awards.

To celebrate the release of her third novel, Oseman's previous two novels and her two novellas all received new, matching covers, designed by Oseman.

In July 2020, Oseman published her fourth young adult novel Loveless. Loveless tells the story of 18-year-old Georgia Warr as she begins her first year as a student at Durham University and who, despite being an avid fan fiction reader and lover of romance movies, has never kissed anyone or had a crush before. In addition to Georgia's personal journey of self-discovery as she realises she is aromantic and asexual, the book also discusses sexuality, identity, and discrimination within the LGBT community, as well as the effect of abusive relationships.

While not an autobiographical book, Oseman has said that Loveless draws a lot from her own experiences growing up and discovering asexuality. She also emphasised the importance of writing a book centered around platonic love, stating that she "wanted to craft a story that had the structure of a romance but was about a friendship."

Loveless received positive critical reception from literary reviewers and media outlets, with many praising the novel's treatment of asexuality and its intersectional and diverse depiction of sexuality. Jonny Yates of PinkNews wrote that the novel is "perhaps one of the most notable and popular books with aromantic characters" and Ani Bundel of Paste expressed how asexuality in novels is "a rare thing still, and the burgeoning world of LGBTQ+ love stories needs more of them." The novel received the YA Book Prize in 2021, and was nominated for Best Young Adult Fiction Book in the Goodreads Choice Awards.

== Personal life ==
While promoting Loveless, Oseman opened up about being aromantic and asexual. Oseman uses she/her and they/them pronouns. Oseman announced that she was going on hiatus from Heartstopper in 2022 due to stress and mental health issues. The series returned in April 2023.

== Bibliography ==
Oseman's body of work is set within a cohesive fictional universe. For instance, the characters Nick and Charlie initially debut in Oseman's novel, Solitaire, and reappear in various works, most prominently in the Nick and Charlie novella and the Heartstopper graphic novels. This shared narrative universe has been informally termed the "Osemanverse" by some fans and even adopted by certain retailers.

Title	United Kingdom			United States		
Title	Publication date	Publisher	ISBN	Publication date	Publisher	ISBN
Solitaire	31 July 2014	HarperCollins	9780007559237	3 January 2023	Scholastic	9781338863420
Nick and Charlie	16 July 2015	HarperCollins	9780008147877	3 January 2023	Scholastic	9781338885101
This Winter	5 November 2015	HarperCollins	9780008147884	5 September 2023	Scholastic	9781338885132
Radio Silence	25 February 2016	HarperCollins	9780062335722	26 December 2023	HarperTeen	9780063374324
I Was Born for This	3 May 2018	HarperCollins	9780008244095	18 October 2022	Scholastic	9781338830934
Heartstopper	7 February 2019 – 2 July 2026	Hachette Children's Group	9781444951387	5 May 2020 – 7 July 2026	Graphix	9781338617436
Loveless	9 July 2020	HarperCollins	9780008244132	1 March 2022	Scholastic	9781338751932

== Awards and nominations ==
In November 2023, Oseman was named to the BBC's 100 Women list. In October 2024, she was named to Time's Time100 Next list as an Artist.

=== Book awards ===
Year	Award	Category	Nominee	Result
2017	Inky Awards	Silver Inky (International Fiction)	Radio Silence	Won
2018	Goodreads Choice Awards	Best Young Adult Fiction	I Was Born for This	Nominated
2018	United By Pop Awards	YA Book of the Year	I Was Born for This	Won
2019	The Bookseller Awards	YA Book of the Year	I Was Born for This	Nominated
2019	Goodreads Choice Awards	Best Graphic Novels & Comics	Heartstopper: Volume 2	Nominated
2020	Goodreads Choice Awards	Best Graphic Novels & Comics	Heartstopper: Volume 3	Won
2020	British Book Awards	Children's Illustrated and Non-fiction	Heartstopper: Volume 1	Nominated
2021	The Bookseller Awards	YA Book of the Year	Loveless	Won
2022	Books Are My Bag Readers' Awards	Readers' Choice	Heartstopper	Won
2022	Books Are My Bag Readers' Awards	Breakthrough Author	Alice Oseman	Won
2022	Book Shimmy Awards	Pagemaster	Alice Oseman	Pending
2022	Book Shimmy Awards	Graphic Novel	Heartstopper: Volume 4	Pending
2022	British Book Awards	Children's Illustrated Book of the Year	Heartstopper: Volume 4	Nominated
2022	Goodreads Choice Awards	Best Graphic Novels & Comics	Heartstopper: Volume 4	Won
2022	Goodreads Choice Awards	Best Young Adult Fiction	Loveless	Nominated
2022	Waterstones Book of the Year	Book of the Year	Heartstopper: Volume 1	Nominated
2023	British Book Awards	Children's Illustrated Book of the Year	The Heartstopper Yearbook	Nominated
2023	British Book Awards	Illustrator of the Year	Alice Oseman	Won
2023	Hay Festival	Medal for Fiction	Alice Oseman	Won
2023	TikTok Book Awards	Best Book I Wish I Could Read Again for the First Time	Heartstopper: Volume 1	Won
2023	GLAAD Media Awards	Outstanding Graphic Novel/Anthology	Heartstopper: Volume 4	Nominated
2024	GLAAD Media Awards	Outstanding Graphic Novel/Anthology	Heartstopper: Volume 5	Nominated
2024	British Book Awards	Children's Illustrated Book of the Year	Heartstopper: Volume 5	Nominated
2024	Goodreads Choice Awards	Best Young Adult Fiction	Heartstopper: Volume 5	Won

=== Television awards ===
Year	Award	Category	Nominee	Result
2022	Attitude Awards	TV Award	Heartstopper season 1	Won
2022	C21 International Drama Awards	Best Comedy-Drama Series	Heartstopper season 1	Nominated
2022	Children's and Family Emmy Awards	Outstanding Young Teen Series	Heartstopper season 1	Won
2022	Children's and Family Emmy Awards	Outstanding Writing for a Young Teen Program	Alice Oseman	Won
2022	Dorian Awards	Best LGBTQ Show	Heartstopper season 1	Won
2022	Dorian Awards	Best TV Drama	Heartstopper season 1	Nominated
2022	National Television Awards	New Drama	Heartstopper season 1	Nominated
2022	Rose d'Or Awards	Comedy Drama and Sitcom	Heartstopper season 1	Nominated
2022	TV Choice Awards	Best New Drama	Heartstopper season 1	Won
2023	British Academy Television Craft Awards	Writer: Drama	Alice Oseman	Nominated
2023	GLAAD Media Awards	Outstanding Kids and Family Programming – Live Action	Heartstopper season 1	Won
2023	Kidscreen Awards	Best New Series - Tweens/Teens	Heartstopper season 1	Won
2023	Kidscreen Awards	Best Live-Action Series - Tweens/Teens	Heartstopper season 1	Won
2023	Kidscreen Awards	Best Inclusivity - Tweens/Teens	Heartstopper season 1	Nominated
2023	Queerty Awards	TV Comedy	Heartstopper season 1	Won
2023	Satellite Awards	Best Drama Series	Heartstopper season 1	Nominated
2023	Visionary Arts Awards	Television Show of the Year	Heartstopper season 1	Nominated
2023	C21 International Drama Awards	Returning Comedy-Drama Series	Heartstopper season 2	Nominated
2023	Rose d'Or Awards	Comedy Drama and Sitcom	Heartstopper season 2	Nominated
2024	GLAAD Media Awards	Outstanding Kids and Family Programming – Live Action	Heartstopper season 2	Nominated
2024	Television Critics Association Awards	Outstanding Achievement in Family Programming	Heartstopper season 2	Won
2024	TV Choice Awards	Best Drama Series	Heartstopper season 2	Nominated
2025	Children's and Family Emmy Awards	Outstanding Young Teen Series	Heartstopper season 2	Nominated
2025	Children's and Family Emmy Awards	Outstanding Writing for a Young Teen Program	Alice Oseman	Nominated
2026	Children's and Family Emmy Awards	Outstanding Young Teen Series	Heartstopper season 3	Nominated
2026	Children's and Family Emmy Awards	Outstanding Writing for a Young Teen Program	Alice Oseman	Won
