= Baby (upcoming film) =

- Directed by: Sam Max
- Written by: Sam Max
- Produced by: Luca Intili; Anita Gou
- Starring: Joe Locke
- Production company: Kindred Spirit
- Language: English

Baby is an upcoming American sci-fi body horror film directed by Sam Max, making his feature directorial debut. The film stars Joe Locke as a young male sex worker who becomes pregnant with a mysterious creature. Produced by Luca Intili and Kindred Spirit, principal photography began on March 29, 2026, and concluded on April 25, 2026.

== See also ==
- Male pregnancy
