= Joe Locke =

Manx actor (born 2003)

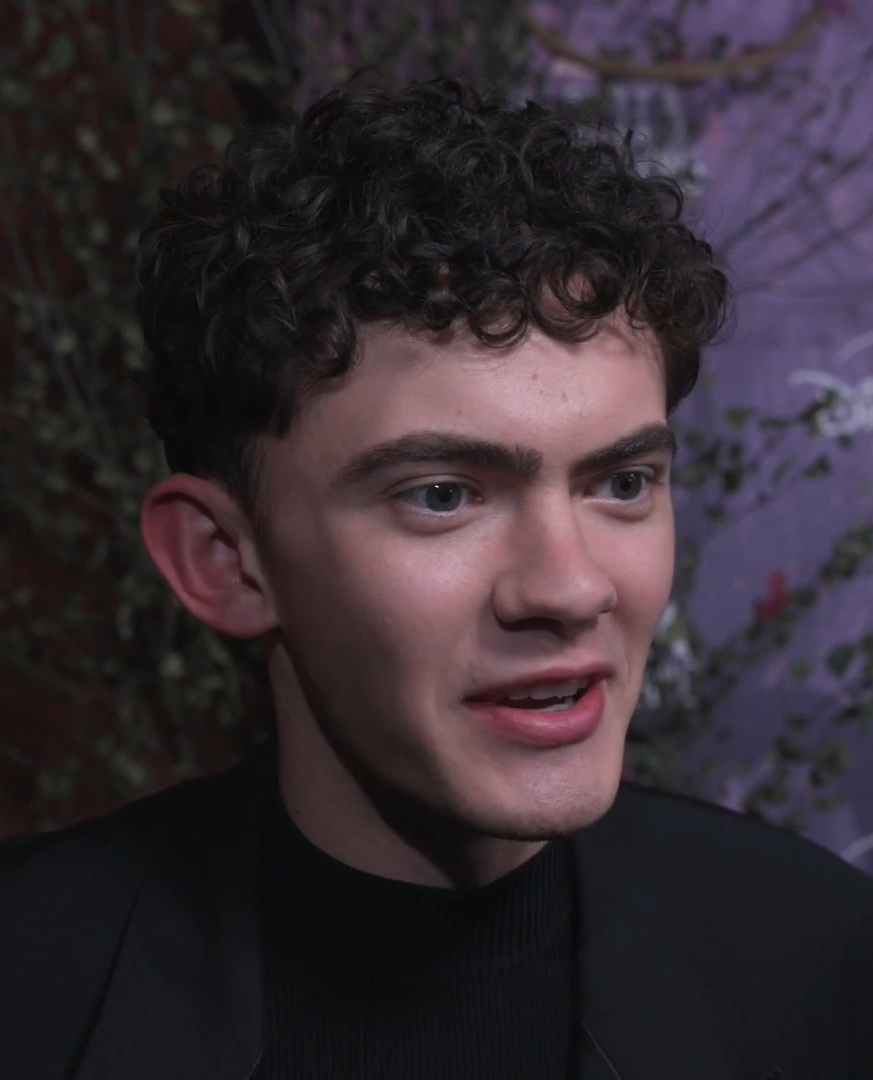
- Locke in 2024
- Born: Joseph William Locke; 24 September 2003 (age 23); Douglas, Isle of Man
- Occupation: Actor
- Years active: 2022–present

Joseph William Locke (born 24 September 2003) is a Manx actor. He is known for his lead role as high school student Charlie Spring in the Netflix teen series Heartstopper (2022–2024) and its series finale film Heartstopper Forever (2026). For his role as Charlie, Locke won the Children's and Family Emmy Award for Outstanding Lead Performance. Locke also portrays a reincarnated Billy Maximoff in the Marvel Cinematic Universe, debuting in the miniseries Agatha All Along (2024), as well as Tobias Ragg in a Broadway revival of the musical Sweeney Todd: The Demon Barber of Fleet Street.

== Early life ==
Joseph William Locke was born on 24 September 2003 and grew up in Douglas, Isle of Man. His paternal family is Irish. His father runs a newsagent, while his mother is a special needs teacher.

Locke attended Ballakermeen High School. He told ITV's This Morning in April 2022 that he was studying for A-level exams in politics, history and English. While in school, Locke and three fellow students submitted a petition to government officials to investigate the feasibility of welcoming Syrian refugees to the Isle of Man.

== Career ==
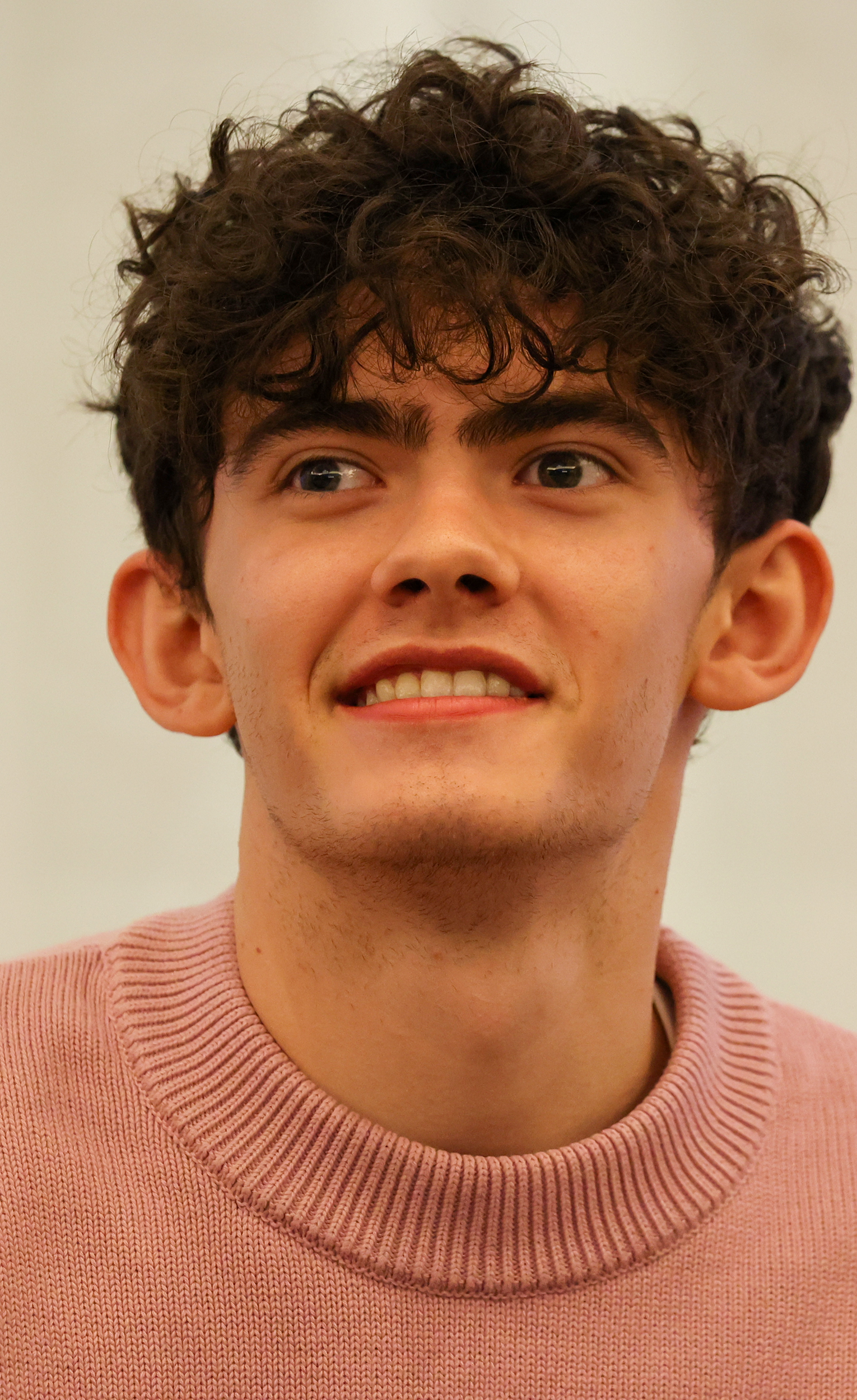
Locke in 2022

Locke participated in the 2020 National Theatre Connections, productions at the Gaiety Theatre, and with the Kensington Art Centre's youth group.

In 2022, Locke began starring as Charlie Spring in his debut television role in the Netflix coming-of-age series Heartstopper, an adaptation of the webcomic and graphic novel of the same name by Alice Oseman. He was chosen out of 10,000 other potential actors who were up for the role through an open casting call. Locke, who was 17 at the time of filming, played a teenage pupil in an English boys' grammar school.

In 2024, Locke took on the role of Tobias Ragg in the musical Sweeney Todd: The Demon Barber of Fleet Street on Broadway. In September and October of that same year, Locke starred in Marvel Studios' WandaVision spin-off television series Agatha All Along for Disney+. He played a goth character initially referred to as "Teen", who is later revealed to be William Kaplan / Billy Maximoff. He reprised the role in the miniseries VisionQuest (2026).

In April 2025, it was announced that Locke would star in a feature length film, Heartstopper Forever, which will serve as the series finale of Heartstopper. He will also serve as an executive producer of the film. In September 2025, Locke made his West End debut in the UK premiere of Clarkston, a play by Samuel D. Hunter. He starred as Jake opposite Ruaridh Mollica.

In January 2026, it was announced that Locke would join Andrew Scott and Olivia Colman in Simon Stone's upcoming Ian Charleson biopic, Elsinore.

== Personal life ==
Locke came out on Instagram when he was 12 years old and told his mother he was gay. Realising he was ready to be out to his family but not the world, he deleted the Instagram post. He came out again at 15. Locke has spoken about his experiences of being a young gay man from the Isle of Man and the parallels with Charlie's story in Heartstopper.

In August 2022, Isle of Man Health Minister, Lawrie Hooper announced that the government would change its blanket ban on gay men donating blood after Locke called for the "archaic" rule to be changed in a video message played at the island's annual pride celebration.

== Filmography ==
Key
†	Denotes films that have not yet been released

=== Film ===
Year	Title	Role	Notes	Ref.
2026	Heartstopper Forever	Charlie Spring	Also executive producer	
2026	Elsinore	Nicholas		
2026	Black Church Bay	Jasper		
TBA	Baby †		Post-production	

=== Television ===
Year	Title	Role	Notes
2022–2024	Heartstopper	Charlie Spring	Lead role; 24 episodes
2024	Agatha All Along	Billy Maximoff / William Kaplan	Main role; 9 episodes
2024	The Great Stand Up to Cancer Bake Off	Himself	Contestant; series 7
2025	Variety Studio: Actors on Actors	Himself	Series 22; episode 4
2026	Kevin	Nene	Voice; Episode: "In Heat"
2026	Heartstopper: Ending On a Hi	Himself	Documentary special
2026	VisionQuest	Billy Maximoff / William Kaplan	Episode: "Forever"

=== Theatre ===
Year	Title	Role	Venue	Ref.
2022	The Trials	Noah	Donmar Warehouse	
2024	Sweeney Todd: The Demon Barber of Fleet Street	Tobias Ragg	Lunt-Fontanne Theatre, Broadway	
2025	Clarkston	Jake	Trafalgar Theatre, West End	

== Accolades ==
Award	Year	Category	Nominated work	Result	Ref.
Children's and Family Emmy Awards	2022	Outstanding Lead Performance	Heartstopper	Nominated	
Children's and Family Emmy Awards	2025	Outstanding Lead Performance	Heartstopper	Won	
National Television Awards	2022	Rising Star	Heartstopper	Nominated	
Queerty Awards	2023	Performance – TV	Heartstopper	Won	
Queerty Awards	2024	Coming Out for Good	—N/a	Won	
Queerty Awards	2025	Badass	—N/a	Runner-up	
WhatsOnStage Awards	2023	Best Professional Debut Performance	The Trials	Won	
Broadway.com Audience Awards	2024	Favorite Replacement (Male)	Sweeney Todd: The Demon Barber of Fleet Street	Nominated	
Independent Spirit Awards	2025	Best Breakthrough Performance in a New Scripted Series	Agatha All Along	Nominated	
Saturn Awards	2025	Best Young Performer in a Television Series	Agatha All Along	Nominated	
Human Rights Campaign	2025	Impact Award	—N/a	Won	
Newport Beach Film Festival	2025	Breakout Award	Heartstopper, Agatha All Along	Won	
The Astra Awards	2025	Best Cast Ensemble in a Streaming Comedy Series	Agatha All Along	Nominated	
National Diversity Awards	2025	Celebrity of the Year Award	Joe Locke and Kit Connor	Nominated	
Iris Prize	2026	Best Performance in a Male Role in a Feature Film	Black Church Bay	Shortlisted	
