= Charlie Spring =

- Heartstopper character
- Joe Locke as Charlie Spring in Heartstopper
- First appearance: Solitaire (2014)
- Created by: Alice Oseman
- Portrayed by: Joe Locke

In-universe information
- Full name: Charles Francis Spring
- Family: Julio Spring (father); Jane Spring (mother); Tori Spring (sister)
- Significant other: Nick Nelson

Charlie Spring is a fictional character created by Alice Oseman. He first appeared in Oseman's novel Solitaire (2014) and later became one of the central characters in the Heartstopper graphic novel series and its Netflix television adaptation, in which he is portrayed by Joe Locke.

In the Heartstopper series, Charlie is a student at Truham Grammar School for Boys whose friendship with Nick Nelson develops into a romantic relationship. Across Oseman's novels, comics and the television adaptation, his storylines explore gay, queer , heterosexual, bisexual and asexual adolescence, bullying and mental health, including anorexia nervosa and obsessive–compulsive disorder.

The character has received positive critical attention for his representation of gay and queer youth and mental health, while Locke's performance has also been widely praised. For playing Charlie, Locke received the Children's and Family Emmy Award for Outstanding Lead Performer in 2025.

== Creation and development ==
Charlie Spring was created by Alice Oseman and first appeared in her debut novel Solitaire (2014), where he is the younger brother of the main character of Victoria "Tori" Spring. Oseman later said that Charlie and Nick were two characters from Solitaire who "deserved more air time", and that she wanted to tell their story in more detail after introducing them in the novel. She initially tried to develop Nick and Charlie's story as a prose work, but said that it "didn't have a novel structure" and was instead better suited to an ongoing comic. Oseman subsequently launched Heartstopper as a webcomic in 2016.

Oseman has described Heartstopper as a more hopeful work than Solitaire, saying she wanted Nick and Charlie's story to be "optimistic and joyful". In the television adaptation's third series, Charlie's mental health became a greater focus. Oseman said the season was "focused on Charlie's mental health", showing him "at his lowest" but also "the journey of him healing". Discussing Charlie's eating-disorder storyline, she said it was important to address the subject through the character because eating disorders are common among young queer people and are still not often shown on screen, especially in boys and young men. Oseman also said the production worked with the eating-disorder charity Beat to make sure Charlie's experience "felt realistic" and that the series conveyed "that there is hope and there is a path towards healing".

Oseman later said that Oliver, Charlie's younger brother in the comics, was omitted from the television adaptation because he had "little to no plot significance other than being adorable", and because hiring a young child actor involved "a lot of difficulties and challenges"; in the third series, the character was instead introduced in a small role as Charlie and Tori's younger cousin.

== Casting and portrayal ==
For the Netflix adaptation, Charlie is portrayed by Joe Locke. Locke was cast through an open audition process; in 2022, British GQ reported that he had been "plucked from 10,000 other hopefuls", with the role marking his acting debut. Locke said that when he first read the script, he saw Charlie as "a more introverted version of me", adding: "Oh my God, it's me. That's really weird."

Locke later said that he "really relate[d] to Charlie and his experiences", particularly because, in his view, there are "not as many stories about the actual queer experience post-coming out". He described Heartstopper as "a real celebration of queer love", and said Charlie's story shows that "queer people deserve real love". In a 2024 profile, The Guardian wrote that Locke's Charlie was "a new kind of hero": "emotionally open, with a steeliness of intent and rock-solid sense of self", and argued that "his vulnerability is his strength".

== Character overview ==
=== In literature and comics ===
Charlie is introduced in Alice Oseman's prose fiction as the younger brother of Tori Spring and the boyfriend of Nick Nelson. In Heartstopper, Oseman later depicts the beginning of Charlie and Nick's relationship. Charlie, who has already been outed at school as gay and subjected to bullying, befriends Nick after they are seated together in form and Nick invites him to join the rugby team. As their friendship develops into a romance, Charlie struggles with insecurity and with the effects of his earlier treatment at school, while becoming more open about his feelings for Nick.

Subsequent volumes of Heartstopper and Oseman's companion novellas follow Charlie and Nick as their relationship deepens. Charlie's storyline increasingly focuses on his mental health, including self-harm, anorexia nervosa and obsessive-compulsive disorder, as well as his recovery and changing sense of self. In This Winter and Nick and Charlie, Charlie is shown at a later stage in his relationship with Nick, including his time in treatment and the strain caused by Nick's plans to leave for university. Charlie also makes a brief appearance in Radio Silence.

=== In television ===
In the Netflix adaptation, Charlie's storyline broadly follows the same trajectory. He is introduced as a student at Truham Grammar School for Boys who has already been outed and bullied before the start of the series. After meeting Nick, Charlie joins the rugby team, develops romantic feelings for him, and begins a relationship that initially has to remain secret while Nick works through his own feelings.

Later episodes place greater emphasis on Charlie's mental health. The series follows the lasting effects of bullying and self-harm on his self-image, as well as his diagnosis with anorexia and obsessive-compulsive disorder, his time in treatment, and his recovery while he and Nick face the prospect of life after school.

== Reception and impact ==
Critics frequently highlighted Charlie's storyline in relation to queer adolescence and mental health. In The Guardian, Anya Ryan wrote that television "almost never got it right – until Heartstopper", arguing that the series presents eating disorders as a "subtle, destructive reality" rather than glamorising them. Reviewing the third series in British GQ, Jack King described Charlie's season-long storyline as a "hard-hitting, season-long arc" and wrote that the show was "exceedingly gentle" in its treatment of him; he added that the material was "elevated by Locke's often heartbreaking performance".

Locke's performance as Charlie also received industry recognition. He was nominated for the inaugural Children's and Family Emmy Award for Outstanding Lead Performer at the 1st Children's and Family Emmy Awards in 2022; on that occasion, the award went to his Heartstopper co-star Kit Connor for playing Nick Nelson. He later won the same category at the 4th Children's & Family Emmy Awards in 2026 for portraying Charlie.

=== Academic commentary ===
Academic commentary on Charlie has focused on queer adolescence, homophobia, mental health and vulnerability. In the Journal of Bisexuality, Melissa Ann Allen argued that Heartstopper presents queer identity through "positive, trope-defying" characterization, and wrote that Charlie's relationship with Nick resists reductive ideas about queer adolescence and sexuality. Allen further argued that the series challenges "compulsory binarization" and other limiting assumptions about queer identity while offering a positive depiction of queer adolescence.

Charlie's portrayal has also been discussed in relation to homophobia, masculinity and vulnerability. In a 2023 article on Heartstopper's first volume, Flavianny Monteiro Carvalho and Carlos Eduardo de Araujo Placido argued that "most of the multiple facets of homophobia were identified in Charlie's characterization", with the character serving as the principal site through which the graphic novel depicts cognitive, general, irrational and specific forms of homophobia. In Critical Studies in Television, Frederik Dhaenens and Ben De Smet argued that Heartstopper participates in the construction of a "cute gay boy archetype" and presents cuteness as a form of vulnerability.

Charlie's television portrayal has also attracted discussion of heteronormativity and mental health. In a 2024 master's thesis on Netflix's Heartstopper, Tracyann Josephine Harmer wrote that the series can be read through "heteronormativity as it relates to masculinity, internalized homophobia, homophobia, and mental health", placing Charlie's experiences at the centre of that analysis.

== See also ==
- Nick Nelson (Heartstopper)
- Heartstopper (graphic novel)
