= Nick Nelson (Heartstopper) =

- Heartstopper character
- Kit Connor as Nick Nelson in Heartstopper
- First appearance: Solitaire (2014)
- Created by: Alice Oseman
- Portrayed by: Kit Connor

In-universe information
- Full name: Nicholas Luke Nelson
- Family: Sarah Nelson (mother); Stéphane Fournier (father); David Nelson (brother)
- Significant other: Charlie Spring

Nick Nelson is a fictional character created by Alice Oseman. He first appeared as a supporting character in Oseman's novel Solitaire (2014) before becoming one of the two protagonists of the Heartstopper graphic novel series and its Netflix television adaptation, in which he is portrayed by Kit Connor.

In Heartstopper, Nick is a student at Truham Grammar School for Boys whose friendship with Charlie Spring develops into a romantic relationship as he comes to terms with his bisexuality. Oseman said she wanted to explore Nick and Charlie's backstory after introducing them in Solitaire, later developing their story as the serialized webcomic Heartstopper.

The character has received positive critical attention as a depiction of bisexuality and queer adolescence. Connor's performance as Nick has also been recognised with several awards, including a Children's & Family Emmy Award and a Royal Television Society Programme Award.

== Creation and development ==
Nick Nelson was created by Alice Oseman and first appeared as a supporting character in her debut novel Solitaire (2014). Oseman later said that, although Nick and Charlie were already in a relationship in Solitaire, she became interested in their backstory because the novel revealed little about how they met or how their relationship developed outside the perspective of Charlie's sister, Tori. She initially tried to tell their story in prose, but concluded that it did not suit a conventional novel structure. Instead, she reconceived it as the serialized webcomic Heartstopper, which launched online in 2016. As the webcomic gained a readership, Oseman crowdfunded a print edition of Heartstopper in 2018.

Oseman has described Heartstopper as a more optimistic work than Solitaire, saying she wanted Nick and Charlie's origin story to be "optimistic and joyful". When adapting the comic for television, she retained Nick as one of the story's central characters but altered the pacing of his arc. Speaking in 2022, Oseman said the series lengthened Nick's journey of self-acceptance because the comic's conflicts were resolved too quickly to sustain a television drama, giving the character more time on screen to understand his sexuality and become comfortable with it.

== Casting and portrayal ==
For the Netflix adaptation, Nick is portrayed by Kit Connor. Connor's casting was announced in April 2021 following an open casting process for the series that drew more than 10,000 auditions. Connor later said that he had originally auditioned for Charlie Spring before being moved to the role of Nick.

Alice Oseman said many actors approached Nick as "quite a macho, jock-type character", but that Connor stood out because he understood Nick as "more gentle and vulnerable and emotional"; she added that he "caught that" quality in the character. Connor later described first-season Nick as a "near-beatific idol" seen largely through Charlie's perspective, and said that later episodes brought him "a little closer to earth" by expanding his family life and inner conflicts.

Connor has also said that portraying Nick's bisexual self-discovery was meaningful because bisexual people "don't get much representation", and called it "a real pleasure" to depict that journey on screen.

== Character overview ==
=== In literature and comics ===
Nick is introduced in Alice Oseman's prose fiction as the boyfriend of Charlie Spring. In Heartstopper, Oseman later depicts the beginning of their relationship, with Nick and Charlie meeting as students at Truham Grammar School for Boys. Although Charlie initially assumes that Nick is straight, the two become close friends after Nick invites him to join the rugby team. As their friendship deepens, Nick begins to question his sexuality and eventually realises that he is bisexual. He starts a relationship with Charlie and gradually comes out to his mother, friends and wider social circle.

Subsequent volumes of Heartstopper and Oseman's companion novellas follow Nick and Charlie as their relationship develops. Nick is shown supporting Charlie through bullying, mental health struggles and an eating disorder, while also dealing with tensions within his own family, particularly his difficult relationships with his older brother David and his largely absent father. In This Winter and Nick and Charlie, their relationship is shown at a later stage, including the strain caused by Charlie's mental health problems and by Nick's plans to leave for university. Nick also makes a brief appearance in Radio Silence.

=== In television ===
In the Netflix adaptation, Nick's storyline broadly follows the same trajectory. He befriends Charlie at school, invites him to join the rugby team, develops romantic feelings for him, and comes to identify as bisexual. As their relationship becomes more serious, Nick comes out first to his mother and later more publicly, while facing homophobia from some of his peers and hostility from his brother.

Later episodes expand Nick's family life and emotional perspective, including his strained relationship with his father Stéphane. The series also continues to follow Nick and Charlie as they navigate Charlie's mental health treatment, increasing intimacy in their relationship, and the prospect of life after school.

== Reception and impact ==
Critics frequently highlighted Nick as a positive depiction of bisexuality and queer adolescence. In Teen Vogue, Hannah Mackenzie wrote that seeing Nick "voice and name" his bisexuality "feels so important", particularly because the character repeatedly has to correct other people's assumptions about him. Writing in British GQ, Colin Crummy singled out Nick's response to homophobia, arguing that his retort "That's homophobic" was "the stuff of a How To Be an Ally manual". Teen Vogue later cited one viewer who said they used Nick's coming-out scene when coming out to their own parents, describing it as "the big moment".

Connor's performance as Nick also received industry recognition. He won the inaugural Children's & Family Emmy Award for Outstanding Lead Performer at the 1st Children's and Family Emmy Awards in 2022, and was nominated again in the same category at the 4th Children's & Family Emmy Awards in 2026; on the latter occasion, the award went to his Heartstopper co-star Joe Locke for portraying Charlie Spring. He also won the Royal Television Society's Leading Actor (Male) award in 2023; the RTS judges described his performance as "profoundly affecting and impactful" and "a really big moment".

=== Academic commentary ===
Academic commentary on Nick has focused particularly on his bisexuality. In the Journal of Bisexuality, Melissa Ann Allen argued that Heartstopper offers a "positive, trope-defying" portrayal of bisexuality through Nick's storyline. She wrote that Nick's development resists "compulsory binarization", the idea that bisexuality is not a valid identity, and the trope of the "promiscuous bisexual". Allen concluded that Nick's journey provides a "positive depiction of bisexuality" for readers who may be questioning their own identity.

Nick has also been discussed in relation to masculinity and vulnerability in teen television. In Critical Studies in Television, Frederik Dhaenens and Ben De Smet argued that Heartstopper helps construct a "cute gay boy archetype" and presents cuteness as "vulnerable". They further argued that such "cute aesthetics" can "soften the blow" when a series addresses heavier material, while still intensifying its emotional warmth.
