= Heartstopper (TV series) =

British teen drama television series

- Genre: Coming-of-age; Romantic comedy; Teen drama; Comedy-drama
- Created by: Alice Oseman
- Based on: Heartstopper by Alice Oseman
- Written by: Alice Oseman
- Directed by: Euros Lyn; Andy Newbery; Wash Westmoreland
- Starring: Kit Connor; Joe Locke; William Gao; Yasmin Finney; Tobie Donovan; Jenny Walser; Sebastian Croft; Cormac Hyde-Corrin; Fisayo Akinade; Olivia Colman; Corinna Brown; Kizzy Edgell; Rhea Norwood; Chetna Pandya; Nima Taleghani; Leila Khan; Georgina Rich; Joseph Balderrama; Bel Priestley; Ash Self; Darragh Hand
- Composer: Adiescar Chase
- Country of origin: United Kingdom
- Original language: English
- No. of seasons: 3
- No. of episodes: 25 (list of episodes)

Production
- Executive producers: Patrick Walters; Iain Canning; Emile Sherman; Euros Lyn; Alice Oseman; Hakan Kousetta; Jamie Laurenson
- Producer: Zorana Piggott
- Cinematography: Diana Olifirova; Simona Susnea
- Editors: Sofie Alonzi; Andonis Trattos
- Running time: 26–40 minutes
- Production company: See-Saw Films

Original release
- Network: Netflix
- Release: 22 April 2022 – 17 July 2026

Heartstopper is a British coming-of-age romantic comedy-drama television series created and written by Alice Oseman for Netflix, based on her webcomic and graphic novel series of the same name. Starring Kit Connor and Joe Locke as Nick Nelson and Charlie Spring, it follows two teenagers whose friendship at Truham Grammar School develops into a romantic relationship. Its ensemble cast includes William Gao, Yasmin Finney, Corinna Brown, Kizzy Edgell, Tobie Donovan, Jenny Walser, Rhea Norwood, Leila Khan, Sebastian Croft, Cormac Hyde-Corrin and Olivia Colman. As the characters grow older, the series expands to explore sexuality, gender identity, mental health, intimacy and early adulthood.

Produced by See-Saw Films, Heartstopper was adapted for television after the company acquired the screen rights in 2019. Oseman wrote every episode. Euros Lyn directed the first two series, with Andy Newbery directing the third. Three series of eight episodes each were released between 2022 and 2024; the first premiered on 22 April 2022, followed by the second on 3 August 2023 and the third on 3 October 2024. In April 2025, Netflix announced that the screen adaptation would conclude with a feature-length finale film, Heartstopper Forever, which was released on 17 July 2026.

The series has received critical acclaim, particularly for Oseman's writing, the performances of Connor and Locke, faithfulness to the source material and its warm and affirming portrayal of LGBTQ+ youth. It won the Children's and Family Emmy Award for Outstanding Young Teen Series, while Connor, Locke and Oseman also won Children's and Family Emmy Awards for their work on the programme. Heartstopper also received GLAAD Media Awards for outstanding kids and family programming, as well as honours from BAFTA Cymru, the Royal Television Society, the Dorian Awards, the Kidscreen Awards and the MTV Movie & TV Awards.

Heartstopper entered Netflix's Global Top 10 shortly after release, helped boost sales of Oseman's books, and increased streams and chart activity for songs featured on its soundtrack. Commentators identified the series as part of a broader shift towards more joyful and hopeful LGBTQ+ television, while Nick's bisexual storyline was widely highlighted as an important example of bisexual representation on screen.

== Premise ==
Heartstopper follows teenagers Charlie Spring and Nick Nelson, whose friendship at Truham Grammar School develops into a romantic relationship. Charlie, who was outed as gay before the events of the story, contends with bullying and the effects of a secret relationship with Ben Hope, while Nick begins to question his sexuality. Their story unfolds alongside those of their friends Tao Xu, Elle Argent and Isaac Henderson, as well as Higgs Girls School students Tara Jones and Darcy Olsson. Elle, a transgender girl, has transferred to Higgs, and the wider friendship group navigates changing relationships, identity and coming out.

As the characters grow older, the series expands to explore mental health, intimacy and the uncertainties of early adulthood. Later storylines include Nick's gradual coming out as bisexual, Charlie's treatment for anorexia nervosa and obsessive–compulsive disorder, Tao and Elle's developing relationship, Isaac's understanding of himself as aromantic and asexual, and Darcy's exploration of their non-binary identity.

== Cast and characters ==
Main cast overview for Heartstopper
| Name | Portrayed by | Season (Note: Each cast member is only credited in the episodes in which they appear. "Featured" cast members are credited alongside the main cast in three or fewer episodes per season, and are sometimes credited with the remainder of the cast in other episodes.) | | | Film |
| Name | Portrayed by | 1 | 2 | 3 | Film |
|---|---|---|---|---|---|
| Nick Nelson | Kit Connor | Main | | | |
| Charlie Spring | Joe Locke | Main | | | |
| Tao Xu | William Gao | Main | | | |
| Elle Argent | Yasmin Finney | Main | | | |
| Isaac Henderson | Tobie Donovan | Main | | | |
| Tori Spring | Jenny Walser | Main | | | |
| Ben Hope | Sebastian Croft | Main | | | |
| Harry Greene | Cormac Hyde-Corrin | Main | | Featured | Supporting |
| Mr. Ajayi | Fisayo Akinade | Main | | | |
| Sarah Nelson | Olivia Colman | Main | | | |
| Sarah Nelson | Anna Maxwell Martin | | | | Main |
| Tara Jones | Corinna Brown | Main | | | |
| Darcy Olsson | Kizzy Edgell | Main | | | |
| Imogen Heaney | Rhea Norwood | Main | | | |
| Coach Singh | Chetna Pandya | Featured | | Main | Supporting |
| Headmaster Barnes | Stephen Fry (Note: Voice only) | Featured | | | |
| Mr. Farouk | Nima Taleghani | | Main | | |
| Sahar Zahid | Leila Khan | | Main | | |
| David Nelson | Jack Barton | | Featured | | Main |
| Stéphane Nelson | Thibault de Montalembert | | Featured | | Supporting |
| James McEwan | Bradley Riches | Guest (Note: Credited as "Student 3".) | Featured | | Supporting |
| Jane Spring | Georgina Rich | Guest | Featured | Main | Supporting |
| Julio Spring | Joseph Balderrama | Guest | Featured | Main | Supporting |
| Prom singer | Baby Queen | | Featured | | |
| Naomi Russell | Bel Priestley | | Recurring | Main | Supporting |
| Felix Britten | Ash Self | | Recurring | Main | Supporting |
| Michael Holden | Darragh Hand | | | Main | |
| Mariam Argent | Laura Hanna | | Guest | Featured | |
| Yan Xu | Momo Yeung | Guest | | Featured | |
| Ivy Olsson | Annette Badland | | | Featured | |
| Mr. Lange | Alan Turkington | Guest | Recurring | Featured | Supporting |
| Aunt Diane | Hayley Atwell | | | Featured | |
| Geoff Young | Eddie Marsan | | | Featured | Main |
| Ant Spring | Martin Marquez | | | Featured | |
| Grandad Roger | Malcolm Rennie | | | Featured | |
| Grandma Nancy | Tamara Ustinov | | | Featured | |
| Principal Edwards | Rebecca Root | | Guest | Featured | Supporting |
| Jack Maddox | Jonathan Bailey | | | Featured | |
| Pete | Derek Jacobi | | | | Main |

== Episodes ==
| Series | Episodes | Originally released |
|---|---|---|
| 1 | 8 | 22 April 2022 |
| 2 | 8 | 3 August 2023 |
| 3 | 8 | 3 October 2024 |
| Film | | 17 July 2026 |

The first series of Heartstopper was released on 22 April 2022, followed by the second on 3 August 2023 and the third on 3 October 2024. In April 2025, Netflix announced that the screen adaptation would conclude with a feature-length finale film, Heartstopper Forever, which was released on 17 July 2026.

== Production ==
=== Development ===
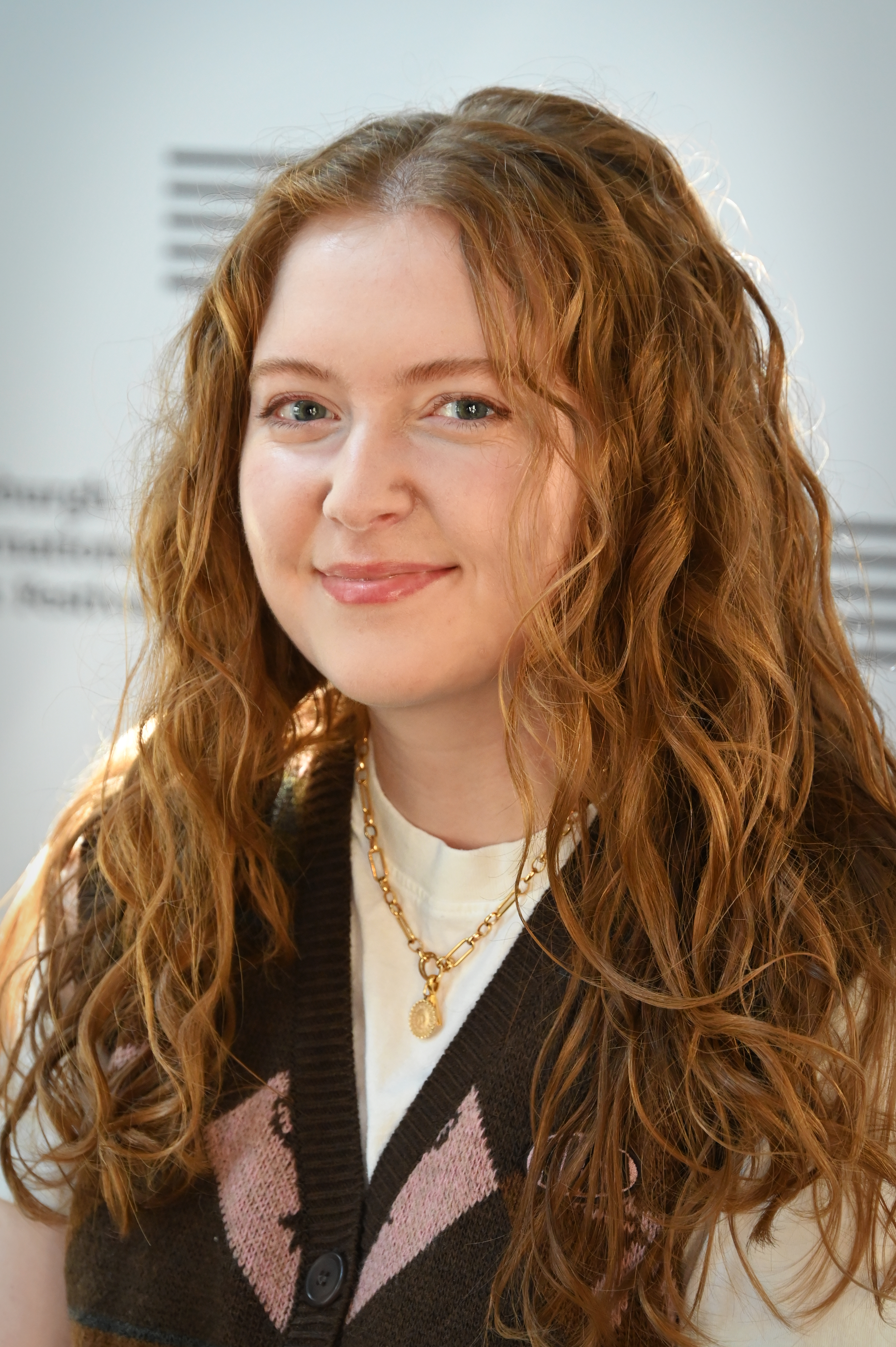
Alice Oseman created Heartstopper and wrote every episode of the television series.

Oseman began publishing Heartstopper as a webcomic in 2016, and it later expanded into a graphic-novel series. See-Saw Films executive producer Patrick Walters first encountered the comic in 2018, when Oseman launched a Kickstarter campaign for the first volume. In July 2019, See-Saw optioned the screen rights to the property.

In January 2021, Netflix ordered Heartstopper as an eight-episode half-hour television series from See-Saw, with Oseman writing and Euros Lyn directing and executive producing. Before the first season premiered, Oseman said that a complete screen adaptation would "probably be four seasons to cover the full story".

Netflix renewed the series for second and third seasons in May 2022. Oseman later said that the simultaneous renewal gave the creative team greater confidence in planning the second season and more time to prepare the third.

After the release of the third season, Oseman said that, if the series were renewed, a fourth season would be its last and that she wanted to tell the end of the story on television. In April 2025, Netflix announced that the screen adaptation would instead conclude with a feature-length finale film, Heartstopper Forever, adapting Oseman's forthcoming sixth and final graphic-novel volume and the novella Nick and Charlie. Oseman said that she was "completely overjoyed" that the adaptation would be able to tell the end of the story.

=== Writing ===
See-Saw asked Oseman to adapt the comic for television. Although Oseman had not previously written a screenplay, Patrick Walters initially invited her to write the first three episodes; after those scripts were well received, Oseman went on to write the entire television series. Oseman said that she wanted the adaptation to preserve the comic's optimistic tone and present a joyful queer love story for young viewers.

As the series progressed, Oseman continued to write both the television adaptation and the original graphic novels. In 2024, The Guardian reported that the cast were not given the books for the third season because they had not yet been fully drawn, and Oseman said there had been "a brief period" of telling "the same story in two different versions at the same time".

For Charlie's eating-disorder storyline in the third season, Oseman consulted the charity Beat, which reviewed the scripts for potentially harmful material.

=== Casting and characters ===
Oseman worked with director Euros Lyn, executive producer Patrick Walters and casting director Daniel Edwards on the ensemble. Walters said the production prioritised authentic casting, and several principal roles were cast through an open audition process.

Kit Connor and Joe Locke were announced as Nick Nelson and Charlie Spring in April 2021. Locke, in his first professional screen acting role, came through the open casting process, while Connor later said that he had first auditioned for Charlie before being redirected to Nick; the final candidates were then paired in chemistry reads. A second casting announcement added Yasmin Finney, William Gao, Corinna Brown, Kizzy Edgell, Tobie Donovan, Sebastian Croft, Rhea Norwood and Cormac Hyde-Corrin to the first-season ensemble. For the role of Sarah Nelson, Colman's casting was kept secret during production; according to Connor, Colman accepted after Lyn sent a personal letter.

After a nationwide casting call, Leila Khan was cast as Sahar Zahid for the second season. The September 2022 announcement also added Jack Barton as David Nelson, Bradley Riches as James McEwan and Nima Taleghani as Mr Farouk, while a later update confirmed Bel Priestley and Ash Self as Naomi and Felix, with Thibault de Montalembert as Nick's father Stéphane.

For the third season, Darragh Hand was cast as Michael Holden. In April 2024, Jonathan Bailey, Hayley Atwell and Eddie Marsan were announced as author Jack Maddox, Nick's aunt Diane and Charlie's therapist Geoff, respectively. Colman did not return for the third season because of scheduling conflicts.

==== Adaptation of characters ====
In adapting the graphic novels for television, Oseman replaced Aled Last with the original character Isaac Henderson because Aled was too closely tied to the continuity of Oseman's 2016 novel Radio Silence. She also created the original character Imogen Heaney because she wanted Nick to have a female friend outside the rugby group and felt the adaptation needed more dramatic tension. Oseman omitted Charlie's younger brother Oliver because of limited space, saying that he did not significantly contribute to the story, and recalled being advised by Lyn that using a child actor on set would be difficult.

Ben Hope's role was expanded for the television series. Oseman said that keeping Ben in the second season allowed the adaptation to broaden the story and address the lingering trauma Charlie carries from the relationship, and that she and Croft did not want the character to receive a redemption arc. Oseman also said that Darcy's non-binary storyline in the third season grew out of conversations with Kizzy Edgell about the actor's own experience.

=== Filming ===
==== Season 1 ====
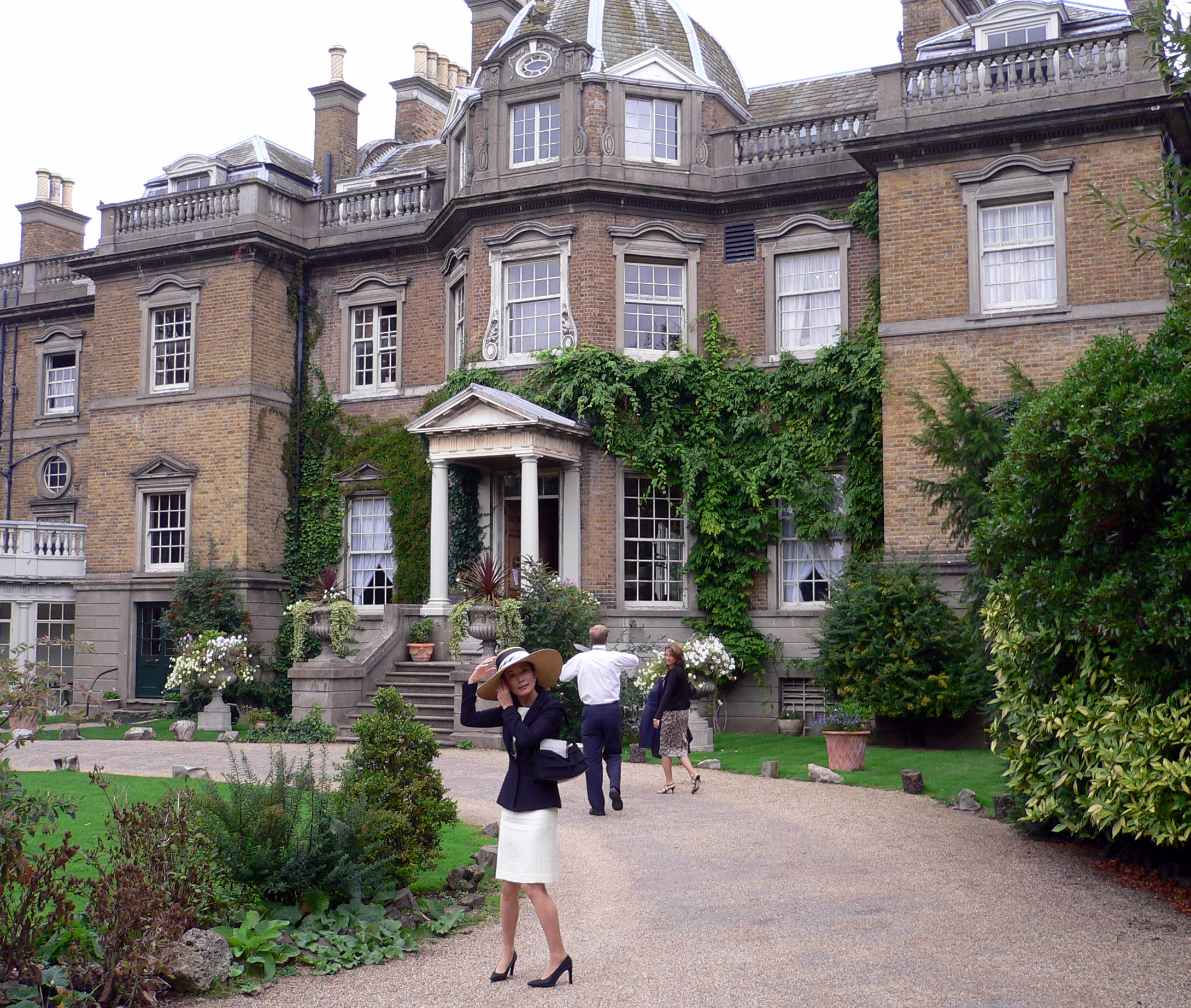
Hampton Court House in south-west London, where Harry Greene's birthday party scenes in series one episode 3 "Kiss" were filmed

Principal photography for the first series lasted 54 days in 2021. Filming took place in southern England, with school scenes shot in Slough, Harry Greene's party filmed at Hampton Court House in the London Borough of Richmond upon Thames, and the seaside finale filmed at Herne Bay in Kent.

Cinematographer Diana Olifirova shot the series with Arri Alexa Mini LF cameras and Canon K35 lenses, and favoured handheld camerawork and wide lenses to stay close to the actors. To reflect the story's movement from winter to summer, she gradually warmed the white balance and softened the image with increasingly strong pearlescent filters. In the bowling alley sequence, she used the location's pink and blue neon practicals for a lighting scheme inspired by the colours of the bisexual flag.

==== Season 2 ====
Production on the second season began in September 2022 and wrapped in December. The series again used Twickenham Studios in London, while the Paris storyline combined location work in the French capital with studio and virtual-production work in Britain.

Simona Susnea succeeded Olifirova as cinematographer. She said the crew had only two 90-minute slots to film at the Eiffel Tower, while access at the Louvre was restricted to a small team with minimal lighting equipment. Scenes on the coach between London and Paris were filmed on a virtual-production stage at 80six's west London facility, and the Paris hotel rooms were built as sets, with the hotel occupying the school's gym. For the prom sequence, Susnea collaborated with the costume department to use UV and RGB lighting, including during Tao and Elle's dance.

==== Season 3 ====
Production on the third season began in October 2023, with Andy Newbery replacing Euros Lyn as director, and wrapped in December. Susnea returned as cinematographer and said that most of the season was shot in and around west London and in studios, with a week of location filming in Lyme Regis in Dorset. Filming in Lyme Regis was reported in early October 2023 on the beach and around the town.

Susnea said the season required "a slight tonal shift" to reflect Charlie's mental-health storyline while remaining true to the series' visual world. She continued the show's predominantly handheld style, used a Sony MiniDV camera for Tao's filmed projects, and brought in anamorphic lenses for the summer fair scenes at the height of Charlie's recovery.

=== Post-production ===
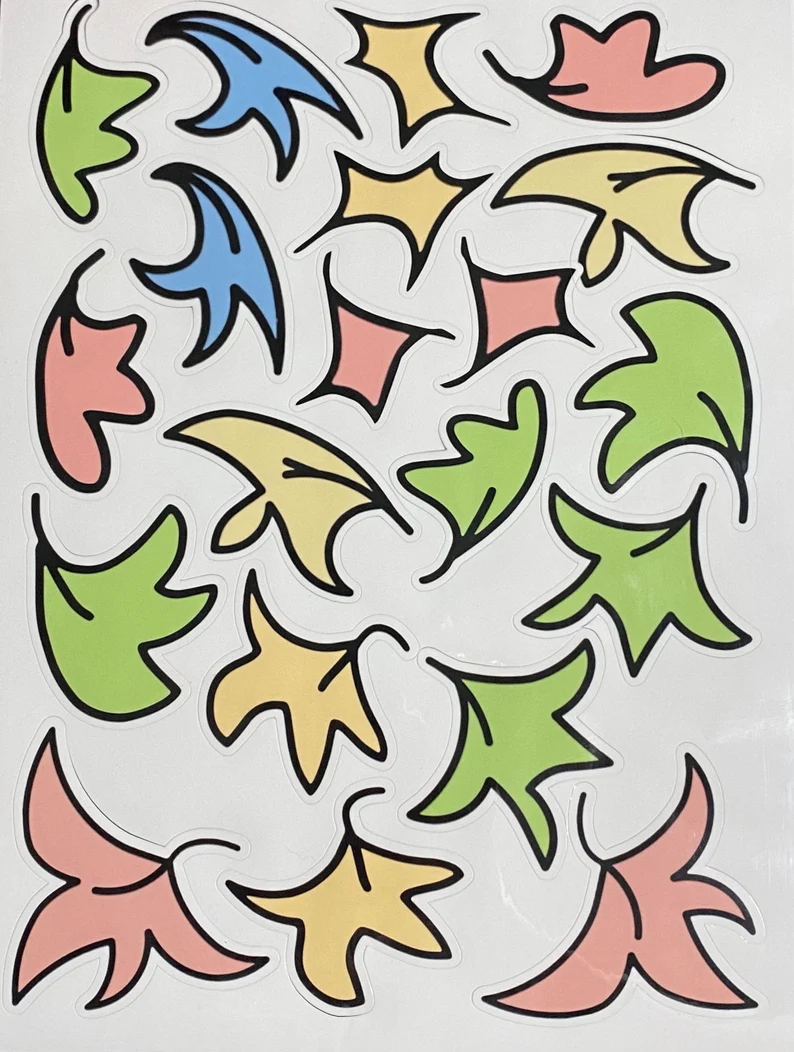
The animated leaves of Heartstopper

Script pages reproduced in the e-book edition of Heartstopper: Volume 1 use the term "Heartstopper moments" for emotional beats marked by hand-drawn doodled flourishes. Oseman later said the series' animated doodles were intended to preserve what she described as the webcomic's "feeling of magic", and that the sequences were animated by Anna Peronetto.

The series was graded in DaVinci Resolve by colourist Tobias James Tomkins. In British Cinematographer, Tomkins said cinematographer Diana Olifirova had achieved much of the palette in-camera, leaving the grade largely to harmonise and enhance the existing look. He said the colour became progressively richer as the story moved from winter to summer, while the animated elements were integrated into the final look to reinforce the series' "magical joy". Olifirova later said that she and Tomkins created a show LUT in advance to support the seasonal shift from colder winter scenes to warmer summer ones.

=== Music ===
Adiescar Chase composed the original score for Heartstopper. In a 2023 interview, Chase said she wanted the music to feel emotionally immediate and used recurring themes for Nick and Charlie, as well as for other characters and relationships.

Billboard listed Matt Biffa and Ciara Elwis as the music supervisors for Heartstopper in its 2022 Tunefind year-end rankings. Walters said that he and Oseman assembled collaborative Spotify playlists while refining scenes and scripts. He said the soundtrack was intended to evoke the experience of being a teenager in the UK, while Biffa said the show's emphasis on bedroom pop reflected music that felt accessible and homemade. Attitude reported that roughly half of the official mixtape's tracks were by queer artists, which Walters said was intentional.

British singer Baby Queen's music featured across the first two seasons. Her song "Colours of You" was written for Heartstopper, and she said it reflected one lead character's journey towards discovering and accepting his sexuality. In the second-series finale, Baby Queen made an on-screen cameo, performing a cover of "Just Like Heaven".

== Reception ==
=== Audience viewership ===
In its first partial week of release, the first series entered Netflix's weekly Global Top 10 for English-language television at number seven with 14.55 million hours viewed. In its second week, it rose to number five with 23.94 million hours viewed and appeared in the Top 10 in 54 countries. In its third week, it ranked sixth with 14.97 million hours viewed.

The second series debuted at number two on Netflix's English TV list with 6.1 million views in the week of 31 July to 6 August 2023, while the first series re-entered the chart at number six with 2.1 million views. In Netflix's engagement report for the first half of 2024, the streamer reported that the first two series drew a combined 5 million views during the period.

The third series debuted at number four on the English TV list with 4.5 million views in the week of 30 September to 6 October 2024. In its second week, it fell to eighth place with 2.6 million views.

=== Critical response ===
Critical response of Heartstopper
| Season | Rotten Tomatoes | Metacritic |
|---|---|---|
| 1 | 100% (61 reviews) | 85 (9 reviews) |
| 2 | 96% (57 reviews) | 79 (20 reviews) |
| 3 | 100% (29 reviews) | 80 (10 reviews) |

The series was widely praised by critics, with the Rotten Tomatoes critical consensuses commending the first series for its sensitivity and charm, the second for its performances, writing and emotional truth, and the third for preserving the show's warmth while allowing its protagonists to grow.

Critics particularly praised Alice Oseman's writing for balancing emotional honesty with warmth and optimism, and for presenting queer teenage life with unusual tenderness. Rebecca Nicholson of The Guardian called the first series "possibly the loveliest show on TV", while Angie Han of The Hollywood Reporter wrote that one of its greatest strengths was the way it treated honesty and self-definition. Saloni Gajjar of The A.V. Club wrote that it refreshed familiar queer teen-drama conventions by keeping Charlie openly gay from the outset and making Nick the character who must sort through unexpected feelings.

Critics also wrote that the series broadened and matured as it continued. Nicholson considered the second series "richer" and "more assured" than the first, while Aramide Tinubu of Variety called it one of television's most vivid depictions of adolescence. Reviewing the third series, Maggie Fremont of TV Guide praised its handling of Charlie's anorexia and obsessive-compulsive disorder as "delicately and lovingly", writing that the storyline showed a new "maturity in storytelling". Richard Lawson of Vanity Fair similarly praised Oseman's sensitivity toward darker material and the chemistry between Joe Locke and Kit Connor.

Some critics were more reserved about the series' earnestness and execution. Nicholson described the first series as "wholesome to the point of retro", while Nick Hilton of The Independent argued that the second series felt overly sanitised and "not very well executed", even as he found it watchable. Lawson wrote that the third series could occasionally feel both "compelling and cloying". Even so, reviewers continued to praise the series' warmth, sensitivity and performances across all three series.

=== Accolades ===
Heartstopper has received numerous accolades for its writing, performances and production. The series received 17 nominations at the Children's and Family Emmy Awards and won seven. It won the Outstanding Young Teen Series award in 2022. Kit Connor and Joe Locke won Children's and Family Emmy Awards for lead performance. Alice Oseman won twice for writing.

The series also won three GLAAD Media Awards for outstanding kids and family programming. It also won a BAFTA Cymru award for Euros Lyn, two Royal Television Society Awards, a Dorian Award, five Kidscreen Awards, and an MTV Movie & TV Award.

== Impact and legacy ==
=== Cultural impact ===
Commentators identified Heartstopper as part of a broader shift in queer screen representation towards joy, affirmation and everyday intimacy. Writing in The Atlantic, Shirley Li argued that the series prioritised "celebration over [...] repression", while Michael Segalov wrote in The Guardian that shows such as Heartstopper "take the dialogue further" by offering openly queer teenagers and supportive adult figures. In an opinion column for The Guardian, Owen Jones wrote that the series could be "a lifeline for many" young LGBTQ+ viewers.

Sources also emphasised the series' effect on queer audiences who had rarely seen themselves reflected so directly onscreen. In a feature on the programme's global fanbase, Time wrote that Heartstopper had "changed countless lives" for some young viewers around the world. In a 2022 guest column in The Daily Pennsylvanian, Alex Keswani argued that the series' appearance in Netflix's Top 10 lists in countries including Lebanon, Saudi Arabia and Sri Lanka was significant because it suggested a willingness among some viewers to engage with queer stories despite hostile legal and cultural environments. Max Hovey from The Independent praised the show for positively representing several LGBTQ+ identities and not just showing the "trauma" of LGBTQ+ people; he added, "Put simply: Heartstopper has managed to shine a light on the joy, love and happiness that can come with being queer. With any luck, it will help a lot of people accept who they are truly born to be."

Nick Nelson's storyline was also singled out as an important example of bisexual representation. A Teen Vogue essay argued that Nick's repeated insistence that he was "bi, actually" pushed back against bisexual erasure and offered validation to younger viewers. Kit Connor likewise said that bisexual representation in media, "especially for bi men", was "shockingly low", and described portraying Nick's journey as "a real pleasure".

At an industry level, the Associated Press reported that GLAAD's annual television study cited Heartstopper among the programmes that had contributed to an increase in LGBTQ+ characters on television over the previous season.

=== Commercial impact ===
The series was widely reported to have boosted sales of Alice Oseman's books. Shortly after the premiere, Publishers Weekly reported that the adaptation was "boosting sales" of the graphic novels, with volume 3 rising to number three on its children's frontlist fiction list and volume 4 returning to the chart at number five. Later in 2022, The Guardian reported that the Heartstopper series had sold more than 6 million copies worldwide. In 2023, another Guardian report, citing Publishers Association figures, said that Heartstopper was the United Kingdom's "biggest export" in publishing.

The series also had a measurable effect on the music it featured. Research published by the Official Charts Company found that several songs used in the first season received large week-on-week sales boosts, including increases of 553% for Baby Queen's "Want Me", 427% for "Dover Beach", and 522% for Chvrches' "Clearest Blue". The same report said that Baby Queen's original song "Colours of You" had already passed 138,000 streams. Bustle similarly reported that Orla Gartland's "Why Am I Like This?" rose from about 94,750 Spotify streams before the premiere to more than 7.6 million twenty days later.
