= Kit Connor =

English actor (born 2004)

- Connor in 2026
- Born: Kit Sebastian Connor; 8 March 2004 (age 22); Croydon, London, England
- Occupation: Actor
- Years active: 2013–present

Kit Sebastian Connor (born 8 March 2004) is an English actor. Connor gained recognition for starring as secondary school student Nick Nelson in the Netflix teen series Heartstopper (2022–2024) and its series finale film Heartstopper Forever (2026). He won the inaugural Children's and Family Emmy Award for Outstanding Lead Performance for the role, and received another nomination for the third season. He has been cast as Scott Summers / Cyclops in Marvel's upcoming X-Men movie in 2028.

Connor appeared in the films Get Santa (2014), Rocketman (2019), and Little Joe (2019), had a recurring role in the CBBC series Rocket's Island (2014–2015), and voice roles in the series His Dark Materials (2019–2022) and the film The Wild Robot (2024), a performance for which he garnered an Annie Award nomination. He subsequently starred as Romeo in a Broadway adaptation of Romeo & Juliet in 2024, a performance for which he won a Theatre World Award and nominations for a Drama League Award and an Outer Critics Circle Award, and in the film Warfare (2025), a performance for which he won a British Independent Film Award.

== Early life ==
Kit Sebastian Connor was born in the London Borough of Croydon on 8 March 2004. His parents, Richard and Caroline, are in advertising. He has an older sister and an older brother. He is from Purley and attended the Hayes Primary School in Kenley, as well as Whitgift School in South Croydon, where he completed his A Levels in drama, English literature, and history.

== Career ==
Connor made his onscreen debut at the age of eight with minor appearances in Chickens on Sky One, the television film An Adventure in Space and Time, and the soap opera Casualty. In 2014, he starred as Tom Anderson in the holiday comedy Get Santa, and as a recurring character Archie Beckles in the CBBC series Rocket's Island.

Connor had a recurring role playing young Petya Rostov in the miniseries War & Peace and as Bob Sheehan in the miniseries SS-GB. He made his stage debut in Welcome Home, Captain Fox! at Donmar Warehouse. He had roles in the 2018 films The Mercy, The Guernsey Literary and Potato Peel Pie Society, Slaughterhouse Rulez, and the BBC One television film Grandpa's Great Escape. He starred as Alexander in the Old Vic Theatre production of Fanny & Alexander.

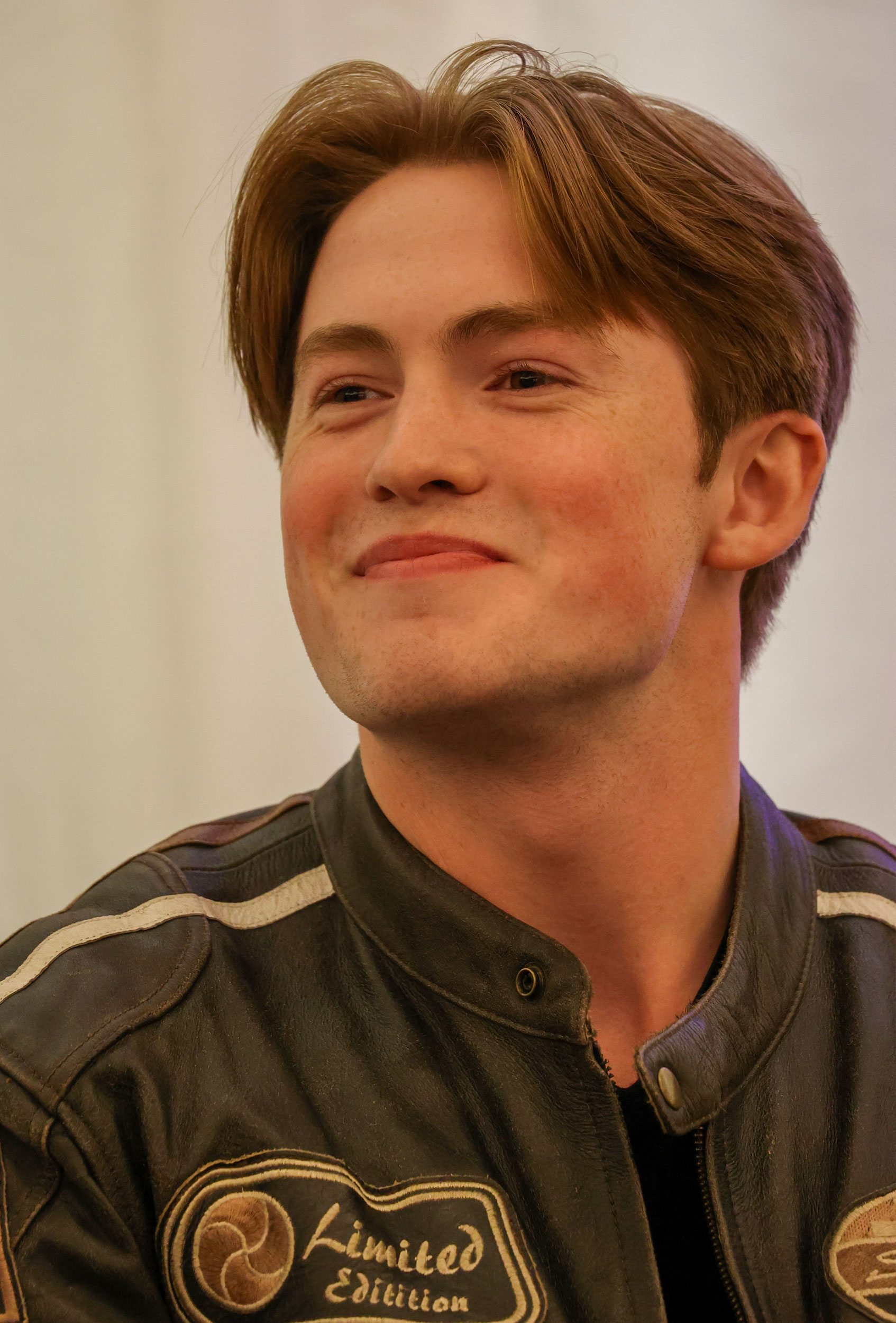
Connor in 2022.

In 2019 Connor portrayed a teenaged Elton John in the musical film Rocketman, and played Joe Woodard in the drama Little Joe. In the same year, he began voicing the part of Pantalaimon in the BBC One and HBO fantasy series His Dark Materials. In April 2021, it was announced that Connor would star opposite Joe Locke in the Netflix series Heartstopper, an adaptation of the webcomic and graphic novel of the same name by Alice Oseman. He originally auditioned for the role of Charlie but ended up cast as the other lead, Nick Nelson.

In 2024 Connor was part of the voice cast of DreamWorks Animation's The Wild Robot, an adaptation of Peter Brown's novel of the same name. He made his Broadway debut playing Romeo opposite Rachel Zegler's Juliet in a musical adaptation of William Shakespeare's Romeo & Juliet directed by Sam Gold with music by Jack Antonoff.

In 2025, Connor appeared in Warfare, an A24 war film written and directed by Alex Garland and Ray Mendoza. In April 2025 it was announced that Connor will star in a Heartstopper feature-length film that will serve as the series conclusion. He will also serve as an executive producer of the film. In May 2025 it was announced that Connor will star alongside Will Poulter and Manu Rios in the medieval zombie horror film Rapture. In October 2025 it was announced that Connor will star alongside Fred Hechinger and D'Pharaoh Woon-A-Tai in Andrew Haigh's A Long Winter. Connor will also next star in an upcoming film adaptation of the novel A Cuban Girl's Guide to Tea and Tomorrow by Laura Taylor Namey.

In March 2026, Connor led the cast of the mystery-horror film One of Us, which had its world premiere at the Manchester Film Festival. In April 2026, it was announced that Connor would voice the lead character in the new Netflix animated movie Charlie vs. the Chocolate Factory alongside Taika Waititi as Wonka. Also in April 2026, Connor was formally confirmed as the lead in the Alex Garland adaptation of Elden Ring for A24, with an official release date of March 3, 2028. Production commenced that month. In August 2026, it was announced that Connor was cast to play Scott Summers / Cyclops in the upcoming untitled X-Men reboot directed by Jake Schreier and set in the Marvel Cinematic Universe. In September 2026, Connor was cast opposite Diana Silvers in the true crime drama Preppy, to be directed by Janicza Bravo

Connor was named a 2023 Screen International Star of Tomorrow. In 2024 Connor was named to Forbes' 30 under 30 Europe list in the Entertainment category. He was also highlighted in Variety's Young Hollywood Impact Report and on The Hollywood Reporter's 2024 Next Gen Talent list.

== Personal life ==
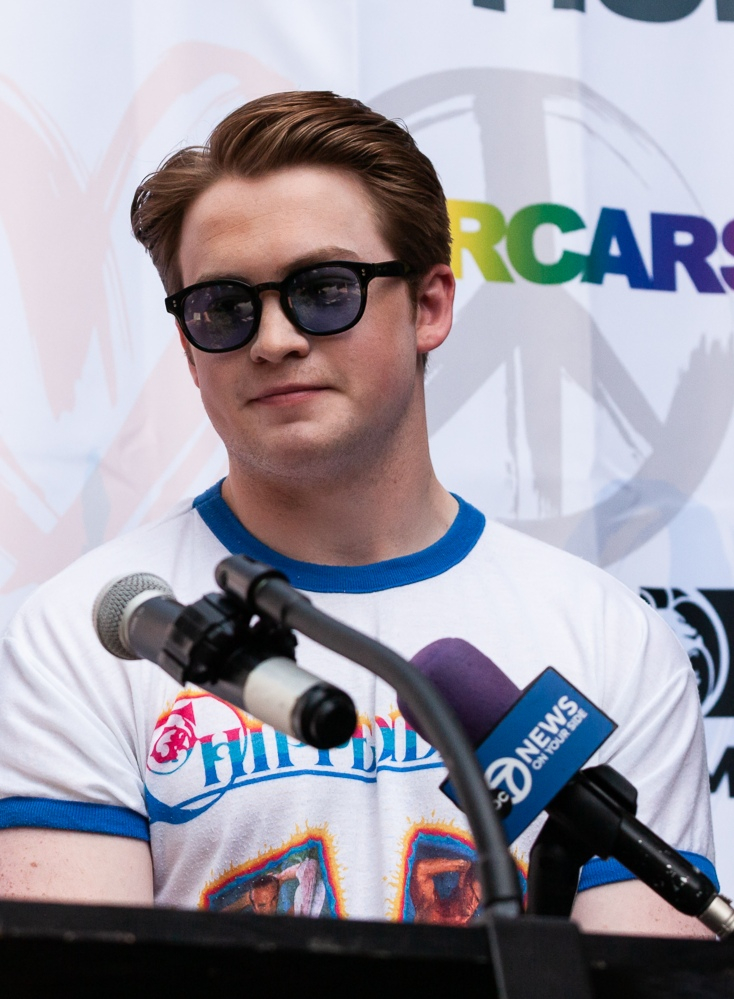
Connor at Capital Pride Parade in 2023

In October 2022, Connor came out as bisexual in a Twitter post. Connor had objected to speculation about his sexuality in the past and had quit Twitter the previous month due to harassment and claims of queerbaiting after he was photographed holding hands with actress Maia Reficco. In his coming-out tweet, Connor said fans were "forcing an 18 year old to out himself" and "missed the point" of the Heartstopper television series. Many fans expressed support for Connor and criticised how people were treating him, as did Heartstopper creator Alice Oseman, co-stars Joe Locke, Sebastian Croft, Kizzy Edgell, and Olivia Colman, journalist Mark Harris, and Labour Party MP Nadia Whittome.

Connor has been named in the top 20 of the UK Pride Power Lists for 2023, 2024 and 2025.

== Acting credits ==
=== Film ===
Year	Title	Role	Notes	Ref.
2014	Get Santa	Tom Anderson		
2015	Mr. Holmes	Boy		
2017	The Mercy	Simon Crowhurst		
2018	The Guernsey Literary and Potato Peel Pie Society	Eli Ramsey		
2018	Ready Player One	Reb kid		
2018	Slaughterhouse Rulez	Wootton		
2019	Little Joe	Joe Woodard		
2019	Rocketman	Young Elton John		
2024	The Wild Robot	Brightbill	Voice role	
2025	Warfare	Tommy		
2026	One of Us	Youngest		
2026	Heartstopper Forever	Nick Nelson	Also executive producer	
2026	A Long Winter	Tommy		
2027	Charlie vs. the Chocolate Factory †	Charlie Paley	Voice role; in production	
2028	Elden Ring †	TBA	Post-production	
TBA	Preppy †	TBA	Filming	

Key
†	Denotes films that have not yet been released

=== Television ===
Year	Title	Role	Notes	Ref.
2013	An Adventure in Space and Time	Charlie	Television film; uncredited	
2013	Casualty	Barnaby Lee	Episode: "Away in a Manger"	
2013	Chickens	Clem	Episode: "Episode Six"	
2014–2015	Rocket's Island	Archie Beckles	Recurring role (season 2), Main role (season 3); 18 episodes	
2015	The Frankenstein Chronicles	Joey	Episode: "A World Without God"	
2016	Grantchester	Charlie Jones	Episode: "Episode 5"	
2016	War & Peace	Young Petya Rostov	Recurring role; 3 episodes	
2017	SS-GB	Bob Sheenan	Miniseries; 3 episodes	
2018	Grandpa's Great Escape	Jack	Television film	
2019–2022	His Dark Materials	Pantalaimon	Voice role; 22 episodes	
2022–2024	Heartstopper	Nick Nelson	Lead role; 24 episodes	
2026	Heartstopper: Ending On a Hi	Himself	Documentary Special	

=== Theatre ===
Year	Title	Role	Venue	Ref.
2016	Welcome Home, Captain Fox!	Small Boy	Donmar Warehouse, London	
2018	Fanny & Alexander	Alexander Ekdahl	The Old Vic, London	
2024–2025	Romeo + Juliet	Romeo Montague	Circle in the Square Theatre, Broadway	

=== Video games ===
Year	Title	Role	Developer	Ref.
2017	Blackwood Crossing	Finn (English voice)	PaperSeven	
2020	Dreams	Foxy (English voice)	Media Molecule	
2022	A Plague Tale: Requiem	Lucas (English voice)	Asobo Studio	
2022	Xenoblade Chronicles 3	Additional voices	Monolith Soft	

=== Audio ===
Year	Title	Role	Notes	Ref.
2022	Oliver Twist	Noah Claypole	Audiobook	

== Accolades ==
Award	Year	Category	Nominee / work	Result	Ref.
Annie Awards	2025	Outstanding Achievement for Voice Acting in a Feature Production	The Wild Robot	Nominated	
British Independent Film Awards	2025	Best Ensemble Performance	Warfare	Won	
Broadway.com Audience Awards	2025	Favorite Leading Actor in a Play	Romeo + Juliet	Won	
Broadway.com Audience Awards	2025	Favorite Onstage Pair	Romeo + Juliet	Nominated	
Broadway.com Audience Awards	2025	Favorite Breakthrough Performance (Male)	Romeo + Juliet	Won	
Broadway.com Audience Awards	2025	Performance of the Year (Play)	Romeo + Juliet	Won	
Children's and Family Emmy Awards	2022	Outstanding Lead Performance	Heartstopper	Won	
Children's and Family Emmy Awards	2025	Outstanding Lead Performance	Heartstopper	Nominated	
Dorian Awards	2022	Best TV Performance	Heartstopper	Nominated	
Dorian Awards	2025	Outstanding Lead Performance in a Broadway Play	Romeo + Juliet	Nominated	
Drama League Awards	2025	Distinguished Performance	Romeo + Juliet	Nominated	
iHeartRadio Music Awards	2025	Favorite Broadway Debut	Romeo + Juliet	Nominated	
International Film Gala	2026	Best Actor	One of Us	Won	
Las Vegas Film Critics Society	2024	Best Youth Performance – Male (under 21)	The Wild Robot	Nominated	
National Diversity Awards	2025	Celebrity of the Year Award	Kit Connor and Joe Locke	Nominated	
National Television Awards	2022	Rising Star	Heartstopper	Nominated	
Outer Critics Circle Awards	2025	Outstanding Lead Performer in a Broadway Play	Romeo + Juliet	Nominated	
Queerty Awards	2023	Closet Door Bustdown	Himself	Nominated	
Queerty Awards	2024	TV Performance	Heartstopper	Won	
Royal Television Society Programme Awards	2023	Leading Actor: Male	Heartstopper	Won	
Theatre World Award	2025	Outstanding Debut Performance in a Broadway or Off-Broadway Production	Romeo + Juliet	Won	
TV Choice Awards	2024	Best Actor	Heartstopper	Nominated	
Utah Film Critics Association Awards	2025	Best Ensemble Cast	Warfare	Nominated	

== See also ==
- List of British actors
