= Anders Langlands =

- Occupation: Visual effects supervisor
- Years active: 2004–present

Ander Langlands is a visual effects supervisor.

In 2016, he was nominated for Best Visual Effects at the 88th Academy Awards for his work on the film The Martian. His nomination was shared with Chris Lawrence, Richard Stammers, and Steven Warner. In 2021, he was nominated at the 93rd Academy Awards for his work on the film Mulan. His nominated was shared with Sean Andrew Faden, Seth Maury and Steve Ingram.

== Filmography ==
- Harry Potter and the Prisoner of Azkaban (2004)
- Charlie and the Chocolate Factory (2005)
- Harry Potter and the Order of the Phoenix (2007)
- 10,000 BC (2008)
- The Chronicles of Narnia: Prince Caspian (2008)
- G.I. Joe: The Rise of Cobra (2009)
- Clash of the Titans (2010)
- Harry Potter and the Deathly Hallows – Part 1 (2010)
- Robin Hood (2010)
- The Wolfman (2010)
- Pirates of the Caribbean: On Stranger Tides (2011)
- Wrath of the Titans (2012)
- Man of Steel (2013)
- X-Men: Days of Future Past (2014)
- The Martian (2015)
- X-Men: Apocalypse (2016)
- Ad Astra (2019)
- Mulan (2020)
- The Batman (2022)
