= York House School =

Location
- 4176 Alexandra Street; Vancouver, British Columbia, V6J 2V6; Canada; 49.2491°N 123.1411°W

Information
- Type: Private
- Motto: Not for Ourselves Alone (Onward and Upward)
- Established: 1932; 94 years ago
- Head of school: Deryn Lavell
- Grades: JK-12
- Enrollment: 656
- Language: English
- Colours: Green and Gold
- Mascot: Teggy the Tiger
- Website: www.yorkhouse.ca
- Last updated: August 2022

York House School is an independent day school for girls located in the heart of Shaughnessy, Vancouver, British Columbia, Canada.

== History ==
York House School was founded during the Great Depression in 1932 by a group of women: Lena Cotsworth Clarke, Janet Mitchell, Grace B. Faris, Virginia Moore Mackay, Marie Gerhardt-Olly, Gladys Jopling and Gretchen Hyland.

The school opened with 17 students in September 1932 at 4355 Granville Street in Vancouver as a residential and day school for girls, and was named after the cathedral city of York, England, home to founder and first headmistress, Lena Cotsworth Clarke, who led the school for 26 years.

The school experienced significant growth, and in 1939, it relocated to its current site at 4176 Alexandra Street. The student population has since expanded to 656, accompanied by numerous campus expansions and renovations. During the 1970s and 1980s, York House included boys in its elementary school, offering education from grades 1 through 6.

| Lena Cotsworth Clarke | 1932 - 1958 |
| Clare Buckland | 1958 - 1964 |
| Clare McDougall | 1964 - 1967 |
| Peter Tacon | 1967 - 1970 |
| Bryan Peet | 1970 - 1984 |
| Rouviere Ritson | 1984 - 1993 |
| Wendy Warburton | 1993 - 1994 |
| Gail Ruddy | 1994 - 2014 |
| Chantal Gionet | 2014 - 2017 |
| Julie Rousseau | 2017 - 2022 |
| Deryn Lavell | 2022–present |

== Coat of arms ==
The coat of arms was inaugurated in the presence of British Columbia Lieutenant Governor, David C. Lam, on April 28, 1993. It was a gift from the York House Alumnae on the 60th anniversary of the school.

Motto

"Not for Ourselves Alone" was chosen as the school motto by the founders and is a guiding principle for life at York House and beyond.

Shield of Arms

The school colours of green and gold, chosen by the founders, are the background for the white York Rose set in a Canadian maple leaf. The open book symbolizes scholarship, and contains the secondary York House motto, "Onward and Upward".

Crest

The gold doe symbolizes York House as a school for girls. The foreleg of the doe rests on a gold York Rose, replicating the original school pin and representing York, city of origin of founding Head, Lena Cotsworth Clarke. As a fleet-footed animal, the doe also symbolizes sportsmanship at York House.

== Uniform ==
The uniform includes a Black Watch tartan kilt, blazer, and a white polo shirt with the school's crest. Primary grades wear a Black Watch tunic. Students also have a choice of wearing black dress pants, as well.

== Campus ==
York House consists of an award-winning Senior School building, Junior School, gym and playing field, and underground facility that connects the campus and includes a music room, art gallery, kitchen and 350-seat theatre.

The York House kindergarten is located a 1.5 km away from the main campus at the Little School, and accommodates Junior and Senior kindergarten students in a welcoming, home-like setting.

== Traditions ==
Founders' Day

Founders' Day was established in 1933 to recognize the seven founding members of York House School and to honour the graduating class of the coming year. During Founders' Day Assembly, members of the Grade 12 class receive their graduation pins from the York House School Alumnae Association.

Candlelight Service

In this assembly, students gather to celebrate the start of the winter break by lighting candles, reading poetry, and singing traditional carols and songs.

Grandparents' Day

This special day in April is for grandparents to visit the school and meet the teachers and friends of their grandchildren.

Celebration of Community

Annual holiday music concert held in the month of December, at the Chan Centre for the Performing Arts.

Remembrance Day Assembly

Held in mid-November to commemorate Remembrance Day.

Prizegiving:

Grade 8-11 Prizegiving Ceremony

This special assembly, for all students in grades 8 to 11, is held in June and honours the recipients of academic, athletic, fine arts, and citizenship achievements.

Grade 12 Prizegiving and Graduation

This ceremony honours academic, athletic, fine arts and citizenship achievements, and is where Grade 12 students receive their high school graduation certificates.

== Academics ==
York House offers a comprehensive academic program through Grades JK to 12. The Junior school is currently ranked number one in the province, and has consistently maintained a first place standing in the Fraser Institute provincial rankings. Likewise, the senior school is currently ranked first out of 252 schools in the province.

The core academic program at the senior school has seven subject areas: English, science, social studies, mathematics, modern languages, fine arts and physical education. Courses in other subject areas, such as computer programming and graphic design are also available.

== Global programs ==
The York House School community embodies its motto of "Not for Ourselves Alone" through a culture of volunteerism, regular fundraising events, international trips, and community service program partnerships with organizations including KidSafe Society, YWCA Munroe House, Granville Park Lodge, BC Children's Hospital, Family Services of Greater Vancouver, and Cause We Care Foundation.

== Athletics ==
York House extra-curricular athletics teams are called the Tigers.

Junior School Athletics (Gr. 3–7)
Starting at Grade 3, girls have the opportunity to get involved in a variety of sports and levels of competitiveness. There are Junior Tigers teams in volleyball, cross-country running, swimming, basketball, ultimate and, track and field. Junior School teams participate in competition among other ISA schools.

Senior School Athletics (Gr. 8–12)
The Senior School's athletic teams include:

- Fall Season Sports: Volleyball, Field Hockey, Swimming, and Cross-Country running.
- Winter Season Sports: Basketball, Skiing & Snowboarding, students are invited to play water polo at St. George's School.
- Spring Season Sports: Soccer, Ultimate, Badminton, and Track & Field.

Basketball

Basketball: From 1998 to 2015, the Tigers have finished top 8 at the BC Championships every single season. During that time the Tigers won 8 AA Basketball Provincial Championships (1999, 2002, 2003, 2004, 2005, 2006, 2010, 2011) and placed 2nd at the 2012 AAA BC's and at the 2007, 2008, 2009 AA BC's.

Other successful York House teams include:

- Swimming: won 6 Provincial Championships (2010, 2011, 2012, 2013, 2015, 2019) and placed 2nd in 2014.
- Alpine Skiing: won 7 Provincial Championships including the recent 2018 title.
- Ultimate: York House girls combine with boys from St. George's School, Vancouver for Ultimate and have won three BC titles.
- Cross-Country Running: placed 3rd overall at the BC Championships in 2005.
- Volleyball: placed 4th at AA BC's in 2014, 5th place in 2017.
- Track & Field: won 4 × 400 m gold medals in 2009.
- Field Hockey: placed 9th at AA BC's in 2012.
- Soccer: won the Jr LMISSGSA in 2010 and placed 2nd in the Sr LMISSGSA league (2010, 2017).
- Table Tennis: won girls' teams event (2018, 2020), and the girls' singles event (2017, 2019, 2020), placed 2nd in the girls' teams event (2017, 2019) and the girls' singles event in 2018.

Senior School teams compete in the Lower Mainland Independent Schools Athletic Association (LMISSAA) leagues and also participate in various invitational tournaments as well as ISA tournaments. The program focuses on building positive character and life skills through participation in competitive sport. Teams focus on the athletic journey and there is an emphasis on commitment, hard work, and teamwork.

== Fine arts ==
Students at the Little School and Junior School are exposed to music, dance and the visual arts, and participate in musical games, storytelling, drama, and drawing.

Senior school students have access to a wide range of fine arts programs and extra-curricular opportunities in music, drama, textiles, new media, film, and visual arts.

In Music, the Senior Band and Senior Choir have received multiple awards. Every spring the Grade 8s and 9s combine bands to perform at the Whistler Music Festival, earning gold standings for the past 9 years. Every other year, the Senior Concert Band goes on tour. Past tours have included Spain, Eastern Europe, Hawaii, Austria, Italy, and California.

York House's award-winning choir program is composed of Chorista (senior choir), Bambina (junior jazz), Ragazza (senior jazz) and a mass choir called Une Voce which means "one voice". They premiered a piece called We are One at the Chan Centre for the Performing Arts in 2012.

York House's drama program stages a production each year, alternating between musicals and plays. Some past productions include Matilda the Musical,The Curious Incident of the Dog in the Night-Time, Midsummer Jersey, Legally Blonde, The 25th Annual Putnam County Spelling Bee, The Girls of the Garden Club, Wizard of Oz, Arrivals and Departures, So Much to Tell You, 7 Stories, and Fame.

== Notable alumnae ==
- Sherry Grauer '55 - Visual Artist - Work is noted for "negotiating the boundary between painting and sculpture".
- Camille Mitchell '71 - Actor, Writer and Director - Her first short film, "A Mother's Love" earned several international accolades. Also known for her role in Smallville.
- Leslie Cliff '72 - Swimmer - Silver medallist at the 1972 Summer Olympics.
- Suzanne Buffam '90 - Poet - Shortlisted for the 2011 Griffin Poetry Prize.
- Jennifer Gasoi '92 - Musician - Won Grammy Award for Best Children's Album in 2014.
- Brittany Waters '01 - Rugby Player - Represented Canada at the 2014 Women's Rugby World Cup.
- Rachel Cliff '06 - Middle-Distance Runner - Winner of Women's Category at the 2014 Vancouver Sun Run, represented Canada at the IAAF World Cross Country Championships in 2013.
- Aliza Vellani '09 - Actress - Works include Sweet Tooth (TV series) and Little Mosque on the Prairie.

== In the media ==
On September 15, 2014, York House School was one of nine buildings awarded the first-ever Vancouver Urban Design Award from the City of Vancouver, for the design of the Senior School. The new Senior School building was also featured on the cover of the September 2014 issue of Canadian Architect.

== Affiliations ==
- Independent Schools Association of British Columbia (ISABC)
- Canadian Accredited Independent Schools (CAIS)
- Federation of Independent Schools of BC (FISA)
