= Seth Maury =

American visual effects artist

- Occupation: Visual effects artist

Seth Maury is an American visual effects artist. He was nominated for an Academy Award in the category Best Visual Effects for the film Mulan.

== Selected filmography ==
- Mulan (2020; co-nominated with Sean Andrew Faden, Anders Langlands and Steve Ingram)
