= Steve Ingram =

American special effects artist

- Occupation: Special effects artist

Steve Ingram is an American special effects artist. He was nominated for an Academy Award in the category Best Visual Effects for the film Mulan.

== Selected filmography ==
- Mulan (2020; co-nominated with Sean Andrew Faden, Anders Langlands and Seth Maury)
