= Adeel Akhtar =

British actor (born 1980)

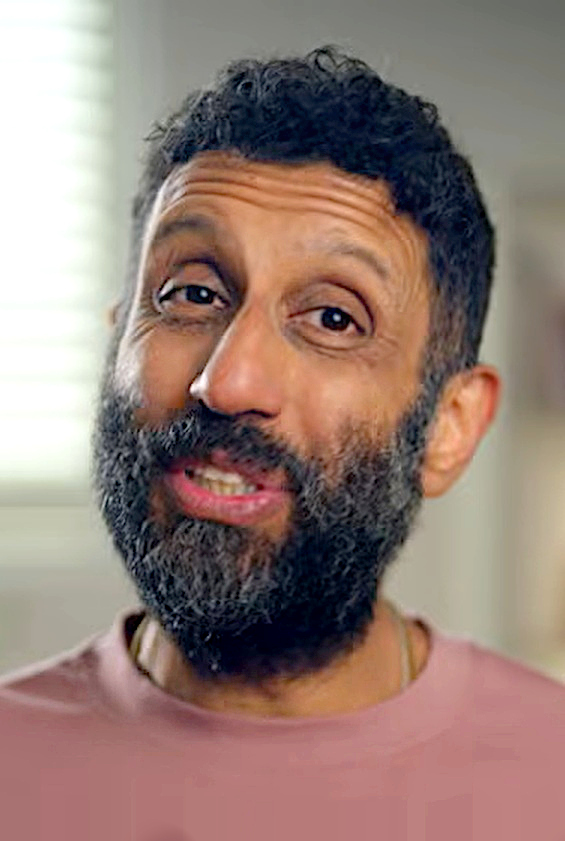
- Akhtar in 2026
- Born: Adeel Hamayun Akhtar; September 18, 1980 (age 46); London, England
- Education: Cheltenham College; Oxford Brookes University (LLB); The New School (MFA)
- Occupation: Actor
- Years active: 2002–present
- Children: 2

Adeel Hamayun Akhtar (born 18 September 1980) is a British actor. He won the 2017 British Academy Television Award for Best Actor for his role in Murdered by My Father (2016); He received the British Academy Television Award for Best Supporting Actor for his role in Sherwood (2022); He won the Children's and Family Emmy Award for Outstanding Supporting Performance for his role in Sweet Tooth (2022).

Other credits include Four Lions (2010), The Dictator (2012), Pan (2015), Victoria & Abdul (2017), The Night Manager (2016), Ghosted (2017–2018), Back to Life (2019), Enola Holmes (2020), Ali & Ava (2021), Showtrial (2024), Fool Me Once (2024), and Down Cemetery Road (2025).

== Early life and education ==
Adeel Hamayun Akhtar was born in Hammersmith, London to a Pakistani father and an Indo-Kenyan mother.

Akhtar was privately educated at Cheltenham College. He completed a Bachelor of Laws (LLB) degree at Oxford Brookes University, after which he decided to train in acting at the Actors Studio Drama School, part of The New School in New York City. While travelling to New York to audition for the New School, Akhtar was detained and questioned by the FBI at New York's John F. Kennedy International Airport after a tip-off from security staff at Heathrow Airport in London, who had mistaken him for a suspect on a security watchlist circulated after the September 11 attacks. He says that this experience has informed the acting roles he has chosen.

== Career ==
Akhtar began his acting career performing at the Half Moon Theatre in London. His first major film role was as the bumbling Muslim extremist Faisal in Chris Morris's film Four Lions (2010). Other comedic performances include Gupta in The Angelos Epithemiou Show, as Maroush alongside Sacha Baron Cohen in The Dictator (2012), and Smee in Joe Wright 's Pan (2015).

In 2014, Akhtar was nominated for a BAFTA for Best Supporting Actor for his role as Wilson Wilson on Channel 4's Utopia. He played shopkeeper Ahmed alongside Toby Jones in the BBC mini-series Capital (2015), and DS Ira King in the BBC's River.

In 2016, Akhtar appeared as Shahzad in the BBC one-off drama Murdered by My Father, for which he won the 2017 BAFTA award for Lead Actor. He was the first non-white best actor BAFTA winner. In 2017, he took part in an American romantic comedy film, playing the role of the protagonist's brother, Naveed, in The Big Sick (2017), and appeared as Mohammed Bakhsh in Victoria & Abdul (2017). He appeared as Rob Singhal in the BBC miniseries based on John le Carré's The Night Manager. He played Barry Shaw for 2 seasons of Ghosted (2017–2018).

In 2019, Akhtar appeared as Billy in the BBC Three series, Back to Life, written by Daisy Haggard and Laura Solon, returning in 2021 for the second series. He played Inspector Lestrade in the film Enola Holmes (2020). in 2022, he was for BAFTA Award for Best Actor in a Leading Role for playing Ali in Ali & Ava (2021).

In 2024, Akhtar appeared as Sam Malik in the second series of BBC drama Showtrial. He played DS Sami Kierce alongside Michelle Keegan in the Netflix series Fool Me Once (2024).

In 2025 he starred as Hamza in 8 episodes of Down Cemetery Road.

In January 2026, Akhtar was interviewed by Lauren Laverne as a castaway on the BBC Radio 4 programme Desert Island Discs.

== Acting credits ==
=== Film ===
Year	Title	Role	Notes
2008	Traitor	Hamzi	
2010	Four Lions	Faisal	
2010	Side by Side	Isaac	Short film
2010	Stranger Things	Mani	
2012	The Dictator	Maroush	
2013	Jadoo	Vinod	
2013	Convenience	Shaan	
2013	The Cost of Living	Jimmy	Short films
2013	Keeping Up with the Joneses	Jerry	Short films
2014	War Book	Mo	
2015	Pan	Smee	
2016	The Big Return of Ray Lamere	Ray	Short film
2017	The Big Sick	Naveed	
2017	Hampstead	Wiggin	
2017	Victoria & Abdul	Mohammed Bakhsh	
2018	Swimming with Men	Kurt	
2018	The Therapist	Adam	Short film
2019	Murder Mystery	Maharajah Vikram Govindan	
2019	The Show	Carpenter	
2020	The Nest	Steve	
2020	Enola Holmes	Inspector Lestrade	
2021	Ali & Ava	Ali	Nominated - British Academy Film Award for Best Actor in a Leading Role
2021	Everybody's Talking About Jamie	Iman Masood	
2021	The Electrical Life of Louis Wain	Dan Rider	
2021	Robin Robin	Dad Mouse (voice)	Short film
2022	Save the Cinema	Mayor Tom	
2022	Enola Holmes 2	Inspector Lestrade	
2023	Murder Mystery 2	Maharajah Vikram Govindan	
2023	F.O.G	Sanjay	Short films
2023	The Puppet Asylum	The Narrator	Short films
2023	The Walk	Amar	Short films
2026	Elsinore	Shahid	

=== Television ===
Year	Title	Role	Notes
2002	Let's Roll: The Story of Flight 93	Hijacker Saeed Al Ghamdi	Television film
2006	Law & Order: Criminal Intent	Hazim	Episode: "Dollhouse"
2006	Conviction	Dr. Darpan Banerjee	Episode: "Downhill"
2010	Angelos Epithemiou's Moving On	Gupta	5 episodes
2011	Coming Up	Hasan	Episode: "Hooked"
2011	Comedy Showcase	Gupta	Episode: "The Angelos Neil Epithemou Show"
2013	Trollied	Ray	Series 3; 13 episodes
2013	The Tunnel	Anwar Rashid	Episode #1.7
2013	Coming Up	Baz	Episode: "Doughnuts"
2013–2014	The Job Lot	George Dhot	9 episodes
2013–2014	Utopia	Wilson Wilson	11 episodes Nominated – British Academy Television Award for Best Supporting Actor
2015	River	Detective Sergeant Ira King	Mini-series. 6 episodes
2015	Capital	Ahmed Kamal	3 episodes
2016	The Night Manager	Rob Singhal	5 episodes
2016	Murdered by My Father	Shahzad	Television film Won – British Academy Television Award for Best Actor
2016	Flowers	Doctor	Episode #1.4
2016	The Circuit	Gabe	Television films
2016	The Last Dragonslayer	Mr. Brittles	Television films
2017	Unforgotten	Hassan Mahmoud	Series 2; 6 episodes
2017	Apple Tree Yard	Jaspreet	Mini-series. 2 episodes
2017–2018	Ghosted	Barry Shaw	Main cast. 16 episodes
2018	Fairy Job	Magical Ahmed	Mini-series. 3 episodes
2018	Counterpart	Casper	2 episodes
2018–2019	Les Misérables	Monsieur Thénardier	6 episodes
2019–2021	Back to Life	Billy	11 episodes
2019–2022	Killing Eve	Martin	5 episodes
2021–2024	Sweet Tooth	Aditya Singh	Main role. 23 episodes Nominated – Children's and Family Emmy Award for Outstanding Supporting Performance (2022); Won - Children's and Family Emmy Award for Outstanding Supporting Performance (2023)
2022	Sherwood	Andy Fisher	Main cast. 5 episodes Won – British Academy Television Award for Best Supporting Actor
2024	Fool Me Once	DS Sami Kierce	Mini-series. Main cast. 8 episodes
2024	Showtrial	Sam Malik	Series 2
2024	Black Doves	Prime Minister Richard Eaves	Co-starring
2025	Down Cemetery Road	Hamza	8 episodes
2026	Who Do You Think You Are?	Himself	One episode

=== Music videos ===
Year	Song title	Artist/Band
2011	I Found a Bike Today	Francobollo

=== Stage ===
- 2008: Zero as The Colonel (Theatre Absolute)
- 2008: In My Name as Zaeem (Old Red Lion & Trafalgar Studios)
- 2009: Wuthering Heights as Yusuf (Tamasha Theatre Company)
- 2010: Satyagraha (Ensemble) (Improbable theatre)
- 2011–2012: Hamlet as Guildenstern and Francisco (Young Vic Theatre)
- 2024: The Cherry Orchard as Lopakhin (Donmar Warehouse)
- 2025: The Cherry Orchard as Lopakhin (St. Ann's Warehouse)

== Accolades and honours ==
In 2016, Akhtar became a patron of the Half Moon Theatre, Whitechapel.

Award	Year	Category	Nominated work	Result	Ref.
British Academy Television Awards	2015	Best Supporting Actor	Utopia	Nominated	
British Academy Television Awards	2017	Best Actor	Murdered by My Father	Won	
British Academy Film Awards	2022	Best Actor in a Leading Role	Ali & Ava	Nominated	
British Academy Television Awards	2023	Best Supporting Actor	Sherwood	Won	
Children's and Family Emmy Awards	2022	Outstanding Supporting Performance	Sweet Tooth	Nominated	
Children's and Family Emmy Awards	2023	Outstanding Supporting Performance	Sweet Tooth	Won	
Royal Television Society Programme Awards	2025	Leading Actor: Male	Showtrial	Nominated	
