= Matthew Hackett =

American computer graphics animator

Matthew Hackett is an American computer graphics animator. In 2008, Hackett was nominated for a Visual Effects Society Award in the category of Outstanding Animated Character in a Live Action Broadcast Program or Commercial (shared with Jeff Willette, Sean Andrew Faden, and actor Denis Gauthier. Hackett is featured within the 2001 documentary short The Making of Final Fantasy: The Spirits Within.

== Filmography ==
- The Purge: Election Year (2016)
- The DUFF (2015)
- Project Almanac (2015)
- Let's Be Cops (2014)
- The Wolf of Wall Street (2013)
- Let Me In (2010)
- I'm Here (2010)
- National Treasure: Book of Secrets (2007)
- Apocalypto (2006)
- Deja Vu (2006)
- The Amityville Horror (2005)
- Sky High (2005)
- National Treasure (2004)
- I, Robot (2004)
- Final Flight of the Osiris (2003)
- Master and Commander: The Far Side of the World (2003)
- Charlie's Angels: Full Throttle (2003)
- Final Fantasy: The Spirits Within (2001)
- Godzilla (1998)
