= Rosalind Chao =

American actress

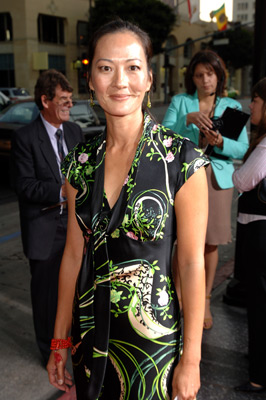
- Chao in 2005
- Born: September 23, 1957 (age 68); Los Angeles, California, U.S.
- Education: Pomona College; University of Southern California (BA)
- Occupation: Actress
- Years active: 1970–present
- Known for: The Joy Luck Club; Star Trek: The Next Generation; Mulan; Star Trek: Deep Space Nine; "Goodbye, Farewell and Amen"; Diff'rent Strokes; I Am Sam; Spider-Man: The Dragon's Challenge
- Spouse: Simon Templeman
- Children: 2

Rosalind Chao
- Traditional Chinese: 趙家玲
- Simplified Chinese: 赵家玲
Transcriptions
Standard Mandarin
- Hanyu Pinyin: Zhào Jiālíng
- Wade–Giles: Chao^{4} Chia^{1}-ling^{2}
- IPA: [ʈʂâʊ tɕjá.lǐŋ]

Rosalind Chao (赵家玲 born September 23, 1957) (Note: Chao's year of birth is disputed. The Associated Press and other sources state 1957. Other sources state 1959.) is an American actress. She appeared as Soon-Lee Klinger in the mid-1980s CBS show AfterMASH, Rose Hsu Jordan in the 1993 movie The Joy Luck Club, the recurring character Keiko O'Brien on Star Trek: The Next Generation and Star Trek: Deep Space Nine in the 1990s, and Dr. Kim on The O.C. in 2003. She also played Hua Li, Mulan's mother, in the live-action 2020 remake of Mulan. In 2024, she starred as Ye Wenjie in the Netflix production of 3 Body Problem. She played the role of Pei Pei in the 2003 film Freaky Friday and its 2025 sequel Freakier Friday. From 2023–2024, Chao appeared in the Netflix fantasy series Sweet Tooth, earning a Children's and Family Emmy Award for her performance.

== Early life, family and education ==
Rosalind Chao was born in Los Angeles, California, and raised in nearby Anaheim. Her parents were performers with the Peking opera before they relocated to Anaheim, where they ran a successful pancake restaurant, Chao's Chinese and American Restaurant, across the street from Disneyland. Chao worked there from an early age.

She attended Pomona College in Claremont, California, and then the University of Southern California, where she earned a degree in broadcast journalism in 1978. She worked at Disneyland as an international tour guide and contemplated pursuing journalism as a career.

== Career ==
Chao's parents were instrumental in her decision to pursue acting. She began acting at the age of five, in the California-based Peking opera traveling company with which her parents were involved. During the summer, they sent her to Taiwan for further acting study and experience.

As a child, she played the daughter of a laundry owner (played by James Hong) on a 1970 episode of Here's Lucy, "Lucy the Laundress".

Deciding not to pursue acting, Chao enrolled in the communications department at the University of Southern California where she earned her degree in journalism. However, after a year as a radio newswriting intern at the CBS-owned Hollywood radio station KNX, she returned to acting.

Chao's breakthrough role was that of Soon-Lee, a South Korean refugee, in the final two episodes of the TV series M*A*S*H. Soon-Lee married longtime starring character Maxwell Klinger (Jamie Farr) in the series finale "Goodbye, Farewell and Amen", which aired on February 28, 1983, and was the most-watched American sitcom television episode of all time as of 2021. Chao repeated the role in the M*A*S*H sequel series, AfterMASH (1983), her first role billed at co-star status.

During the development of Star Trek: The Next Generation, Chao was considered for the role of Enterprise security chief Tasha Yar. The role ultimately went to Denise Crosby, but Chao was later cast in a recurring role as Japanese exo-botanist Keiko O'Brien, which she reprised on Star Trek: Deep Space Nine.

In August 2018, Chao was cast as Mulan's mother in the 2020 live-action retelling of Mulan. In 2019, she was invited to join the Academy of Motion Picture Arts and Sciences, citing her contributions to the critically acclaimed films The Joy Luck Club and I Am Sam.

== Personal life ==
Chao met her husband Simon Templeman while they were working in theatre at the Mark Taper Forum. They have a son and a daughter.

== Filmography ==
=== Film ===
Year	Film	Role	Notes
1980	The Big Brawl	Mae	
1981	Spider-Man: The Dragon's Challenge	Emily Chan	
1981	An Eye for an Eye	Linda Chen	
1983	The Terry Fox Story	Rika Noda	Theatres in Canada and Britain
1983	Going Berserk	Kung Fu Girl	
1987	Slam Dance	Mrs. Bell	
1987	The Tribulations of a Chinese Gentleman	Lianhua	
1988	White Ghost	Thi Hau	
1990	Denial	Terry	
1990	Thousand Pieces of Gold	Lalu Nathoy/Polly Bemis	
1992	Memoirs of an Invisible Man	Cathy DiTolla	
1993	The Joy Luck Club	Rose	
1994	North	Chinese Mom	
1994	Love Affair	Lee	
1997	The End of Violence	Claire	
1998	What Dreams May Come	Leona	
2000	Enemies of Laughter	Carla	
2001	The Man from Elysian Fields	Female Customer	
2001	Impostor	Newscaster	Uncredited
2001	I Am Sam	Lily	
2003	Freaky Friday	Pei-Pei	
2005	Life of the Party	Mei Lin	
2005	Just like Heaven	Fran	
2007	Nanking	Chang Yu Zheng	
2009	The Rising Tide	Narrator	
2012	Knife Fight	Kate - Focus Group Moderator	
2015	Stockholm, Pennsylvania	Dr. Andrews	
2017	Tragedy Girls	Mayor Campbell	
2019	Plus One	Angela	
2019	The Laundromat	Gu Kailai	
2020	Mulan	Hua Li	
2020	Magic Camp	Lorraine	Uncredited
2021	Together Together	Dr. Andrews	
2021	The Starling	Fawn	
2024	Sacramento	Dr. Lisa Murray	
2025	Freakier Friday	Pei-Pei	

=== Television ===
Year	Film	Role	Notes/Ref.
1970	Here's Lucy	Linda Wong	1 episode
1972	Anna and the King	Princess Serana	1 episode
1973	Kung Fu	Dancer	Season 1, Episode 5, "The Tide;" uncredited
1976	ABC Afterschool Specials	The Kurmese Ambassador's Daughter	1 episode
1977	The Hardy Boys/Nancy Drew Mysteries	Lily	Episode: "The Secret of the Jade Kwan Yin"
1977	Kojak	Grace Chen	Episode: "The Summer of '69: Part 1"
1978	The Incredible Hulk	Receptionist	Episode: "Married"
1979	How the West Was Won	Li Sin	Episode: "China Girl"
1979	The Ultimate Imposter	Lai-Ping	Television film
1979	Emergency! The Convention	Kathy	Television film
1979	The Amazing Spider-Man	Emily Chan	Episode: "The Chinese Web" (Part 1 & 2)
1979	A Man Called Sloane	Soom Nuk	Episode: "Tuned for Destruction"
1979	Mysterious Island of Beautiful Women	Flower	Television film
1981	The Misadventures of Sheriff Lobo	Leslie Chiu	Episode: "The Roller Disco Karate Kaper"
1981	The Harlem Globetrotters on Gilligan's Island	Hotel Clerk	Television film
1981	Twirl	Kim King	Television film
1981	One Day at a Time	Gloria	Episode: "Julie Shows Up: Part 2"
1981–1983	Diff'rent Strokes	Ming Li / Miss Chung	Recurring role (8 episodes)
1982	Moonlight	Daphne Wu	Television film
1982	Bring 'Em Back Alive		Episode: "The Reel World of Frank Buck"
1983	The Terry Fox Story	Rika	Television film
1983	M*A*S*H	Soon-Lee	Recurring role (2 episodes)
1983–1985	AfterMASH	Soon-Lee Klinger	Main cast (30 episodes)
1986	Riptide	Lucy	Episode – "Smiles We Left Behind"
1986	Falcon Crest	Li Ying	Recurring role (4 episodes)
1986	Jack and Mike	Holly Sykes	Episode: "Pilot"
1986	St. Elsewhere	Mary Wilson	Episode: "Not My Type"
1986	The A-Team	Alice Heath	Episode: "Point of No Return"
1986	American Playhouse	Ku Ling	Episode: "Paper Angels"
1987	Spies		Episode: "From China with Love"
1987	Stingray	Colette Tran	Episode: "Anytime, Anywhere"
1987	Max Headroom	Angie Barry	2 episodes
1987	Private Eye	Kai-Lee	Episode: "Nobody Dies in Chinatown"
1988	Beauty and the Beast	Lin Wong	Episode: "China Moon"
1988	Tour of Duty	Li Kiem	Episode: "Gray-Brown Odyssey"
1988	Shooter	Lan	Television film
1988	Miami Vice	Mai Ying	Episode: "Heart of Night"
1989	Jake and the Fatman	Elaine Nakasone	Episode: "The Way You Look Tonight"
1990	Drug Wars: The Camarena Story	Thanh Steinmetz	3 episodes
1990	Against the Law	Toy Feng	Episode: "Pilot"
1991	Thirtysomething	Willa Camden	Episode: "California"
1991–1992	Star Trek: The Next Generation	Keiko O'Brien	Recurring role (8 episodes)
1992	Intruders	Dr. Jenny Sakai	2 episodes
1993–1999	Star Trek: Deep Space Nine	Keiko O'Brien	Recurring role (19 episodes)
1994	Web of Deception	Dr. Sheila Prosser	Television film
1995	Murder, She Wrote	Phoebe Campbell	Episode: "Nailed"
1995	Chicago Hope	Allison Granger	Episode: "Rise from the Dead"
1995–1996	The Magic School Bus	Mrs. Li (voice)	2 episodes
1996	To Love, Honor and Deceive	Sydney's Unnamed Friend	Television film
1998	Brimstone	Nina Chou	Episode: "Poem"
1999	Get Real	Anne Collins	Episode: "Passages"
1999	ER	Dr. Chao	Episode: "Humpty Dumpty"
2000	Family Law	Dr. Seabourne	Episode: "Going Home"
2001	Gideon's Crossing	Claire Hines	Episode: "Filaments and Ligatures"
2001	The West Wing	Jane Gentry	Episode: "The Fall's Gonna Kill You"
2001	Arliss	Karen	Episode: "As Others See Us"
2001	Three Blind Mice	Li Mei Chen	Television film
2001	Citizen Baines	Dr. Judith Lin	Recurring role (3 episodes)
2001	Once and Again	Tami Seitz	Episode: "Pictures"
2002	Dharma & Greg	Patricia	Episode: "Tuesday's Child"
2002	MDs	Angela Yuan	Episode: "R.I.P."
2003–2006	The O.C.	Dr. Kim	Recurring role (6 episodes)
2003	Without a Trace	Helen Collins	Episode: "Hang on to Me"
2003	Monk	Arleen Cassidy	Episode: "Mr. Monk Goes Back to School"
2003	The Parkers	Prof. Thornhill	Episode: "Cheaters Never Prosper"
2003–2004	10-8: Officers on Duty	Lt. Maggie Chen	4 episodes
2004	Century City	Doctor	Episode: "The Face Was Familiar"
2004	Medical Investigation	Dr. Kramer	Episode: "Price of Pleasure"
2004	Center of the Universe	Dr. Geisler	Episode: "Art's Heart"
2005	Six Feet Under	Cindy	3 episodes
2005	According to Jim	Sally Wu	Episode: "James & the Annoying Peach"
2006	Ben 10	Councilwoman Liang (voice)	Episode: "Side Effects"
2006	W.I.T.C.H.	Joan Lin, Mandy (voice)	Episode: "V Is for Victory"
2007	Tell Me You Love Me	Cynthia	Recurring role (3 episodes)
2008	Grey's Anatomy	Kathleen Patterson	Episode: "All By Myself"
2009	Private Practice	Lillie Jordan	Episode: "Slip Slidin' Away"
2010	CSI	Michelle Huntley	Episode: "Long Ball"
2010	Trauma	Therapist	2 episodes
2010	The Event	Doctor	2 episodes
2011	Law & Order: Criminal Intent	Mrs. Zhuang	Episode: "Cadaver"
2012	Don't Trust the B— in Apartment 23	Pastor Jin	Recurring role (4 episodes)
2012	Bones	Mandy Oh	Episode: "The Suit on the Set"
2014	Intelligence	Sheng-Li wang	Episode: "Pilot"
2014	Shameless	Doctor	Episode: "Strangers on a Train"
2014	The Neighbors	Barb Hartley	2 episodes
2014	Forever	Frenchman	Episode: "The Frustrating Thing About Psychopaths"
2015	Castle	Mimi Tan	Episode: "Hong Kong Hustle"
2015	Sin City Saints	Mrs. Wu	5 episodes
2016	The Muppets	Woman #1	Episode: "A Tail of Two Piggies"
2016	Hawaii Five-0	Governor Keiko Mahoe	Episode: "Makaukau 'oe e Pa'ani?"
2016	The OA	Patricia Knowler	Episode: "Champion"
2017	Black-ish	Dr. Stone	Episode: "Manternity"
2017	The Catch	Kohana Takashi	Episode: "The Dining Hall"
2018	Code Black	Jae Eun	2 episodes
2019	This Is Us	Anna	Episode: "The Pool: Part Two "
2020	The L Word: Generation Q	Grace Lee	Episode: "Lose It All"
2020–2022	Better Things	Caroline	6 episodes
2022	The First Lady	Tina Tchen	
2023–2024	Sweet Tooth	Mrs. Zhang	Guest season 2; Main season 3
2024	3 Body Problem	Ye Wenjie	

=== Theatre ===
Year	Title	Role	Notes
2008	Some Girl(s)	Lindsay	
2018	The Great Wave	Etsuko	National Theatre of Great Britain

=== Video games ===
Year	Title	Role
1995	Shanghai: Great Moments	Rosalind Chao / Guide

== Awards and nominations ==
Year	Organisation	Category	Project	Result	Ref.
2025	Children's and Family Emmy Awards	Outstanding Supporting Performer in a Preschool, Children's or Young Teen Program	Sweet Tooth	Nominated	
