= Aliza Vellani =

Canadian actress (born 1991)

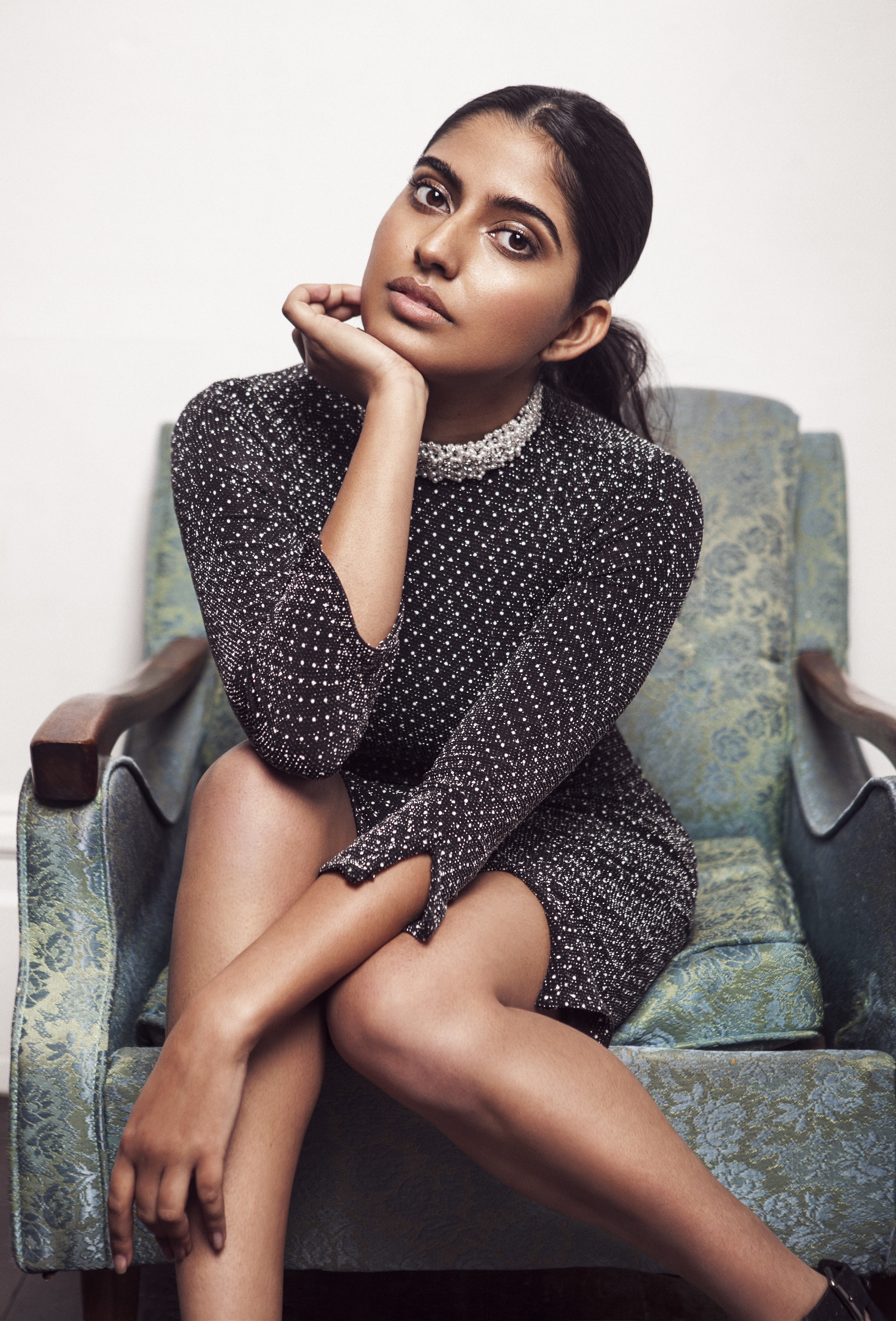
- Portrait of Aliza Vellani, 2016
- Born: October 30, 1991 (age 34); Vancouver, British Columbia, Canada
- Education: Simon Fraser University
- Occupation: Actress
- Years active: 2006–present

Aliza Vellani (born October 30, 1991) is a Canadian film and television actress based in British Columbia. Vellani is most recently known for her role as Rani Singh in the Netflix series, Sweet Tooth. Her other credits include Layla Siddiqui on CBC's series Little Mosque on the Prairie, Marcy in the CW series iZombie and Sandeep in the revival season of the Fox series The X-Files.

== Early life and education ==
Vellani was born in Vancouver to Indian immigrants from East Africa. She began her training at an early age while she attended York House School. In 2007 and 2008, Vellani won the BC and National Istar Awards for Arts and Culture. After high school, Vellani continued her training in acting, voice and dance. Vellani holds a BFA, majoring in Theatre, from Simon Fraser University.

== Filmography ==
=== Film ===
Year	Title	Role	Notes
2014	Emma	Zara	Short
2017	WoodMan	Lady in Blue	Short
2018	All Kinds of Weather	Preet	Short
2019	The Art of Racing in the Rain	Assistant	
2020	Operation Christmas Drop	Sally	

=== Television ===
Year	Title	Role	Notes
2007–12	Little Mosque on the Prairie	Layla Siddiqui	Recurring role
2009	The Troop	Sarame	Episode: "Pajama Game... of Death"
2010	The Cult	Janice	Television film
2011	Geek Charming	Another Random Girl	Television film
2014	Motive	Dr. Gita Ambreen	Episode: "Angels with Dirty Faces"
2014	Rush	Nurse Joy	Episode: "Where Is My Mind?"
2015	Exposed	Coach	Television film
2015	iZombie	Marcy	2 episodes
2015	Mistresses	Counselor Sarah	Episode: "Into the Woods"
2015	Signed, Sealed, Delivered: Truth Be Told	Nilofer	Television film
2015	Signed, Sealed, Delivered: The Impossible Dream	Nilofer	Television film
2015–16	The X-Files	Nurse Sandeep	2 episodes
2016	Three Bedrooms, One Corpse: An Aurora Teagarden Mystery	Patty	TV film
2016	Supernatural	Beth Roberts	Episode: "American Nightmare"
2017	The Flash	Shelia Agnani	Episode: "Mixed Signals"
2017-2020	Marvel Super Hero Adventures	Ms. Marvel (voice)	Recurring role
2017	Hit the Road	Naima	Episode: "School Spirit"
2017	Doomsday	Young Scientist	Television film
2017–18	Mech-X4	Soldier, Lt. Verma	Recurring role
2018	Blurt	Mrs. McCann	Television film
2018	Riverdale	Mrs. Haggly	2 episodes
2018	Colony	Recruitment Officer	Episode: "A Clean, Well-Lighted Place"
2019	Kim Possible	Gossiping Mom	Television film
2021; 2023	Sweet Tooth	Rani Singh	Main cast (seasons 1–2)
