= Neil Sandilands =

South African actor and filmmaker

- Born: Neil Joseph William Sandilands; Randfontein, South Africa
- Occupations: Actor, director, screenwriter, producer, film editor, cinematographer, musician
- Years active: 1991–present
- Website: neilsandilands.com

Neil Joseph William Sandilands is a South African actor, filmmaker, and musician known for recurring roles on Hap and Leonard, The 100, The Flash season 4 as Clifford DeVoe / The Thinker. He also played General Abbott in Sweet Tooth, for which he received a Children's and Family Emmy Award for Outstanding Supporting Performance nomination.

== Career ==
Sandilands began his career in his home country of South Africa and acted in a variety of projects, including the television series 7de Laan, where he portrayed the character Bart Kruger from 2000 to 2007. After finishing his work on 7de Laan, he moved to Los Angeles, California in 2007. During his time in Los Angeles, Sandilands notably appeared in the American drama series House. He later returned to South Africa and appeared in a number of popular Afrikaans films, including the award-winning drama Die Ballade van Robbie de Wee. During this time Sandilands would take up other jobs such as production and construction to support himself, once stating, "I had to revert to other disciplines such as directing and post-production and sometimes built fences for my neighbours or some other unmentionable activities to simply keep the wolf at bay," Sandilands said of his journey back to the United States. Sandilands returned to the U.S. in 2014.

In 2015, Sandilands landed a guest role as South African intelligence agent Eugen Venter on the hit FX series The Americans. The following year in 2016, he had recurring roles as Titus in The CW's The 100 and as Paco in the SundanceTV's Hap and Leonard. In 2017, Sandilands had a guest role in the long-running CBS series NCIS and joined the main cast of Season 4 of The CW superhero drama The Flash as Clifford DeVoe / The Thinker.

In August 2022, Sandilands was cast in a role in the film Kingdom of the Planet of the Apes, a film directed by Wes Ball for 20th Century Studios.

== Personal life ==
Sandilands speaks both Afrikaans and English.

== Filmography ==
=== Acting ===
==== Film ====
Year	Title	Role	Notes
2004	Proteus	Rijkhaart Jacobz	
2010	Jakhalsdans	Dawid le Fleur	Also assistant director
2011	The Darkness is Close Behind	Mr. Lemoy	Short
2012	One Last Look	Frank McCintosh	
2013	Die Laaste Tango	Kaptein Etlinger	
2013	Lucy & Janie	Lucy's Dad	Short
2013	Hoe Duur Was De Suiker	Reinder Almersma	
2013	Musiek vir die Agtergrond	Freddy	
2013	Die Ballade van Robbie de Wee	Len van Jaarsveld	
2013	A Man on a Road Is Best Left Alone		Short
2015	Blackhat	Harbour pilot	(uncredited)
2018	Frank and Ava	Zinnemann	
2019	Coyote Lake	Dirk	
2019	The Drone	The Violator	
2020	News of the World	Wilhelm Leonberger	
2021	Destination Marfa	Norman	DVD, Amazon, VUDU
2024	Slay	Dusty	
2024	Kingdom of the Planet of the Apes	Koro	Motion-capture role

==== Television ====
Year	Title	Role	Notes
1991	Meester	Bertus Conradie	
1992	Konings	Dolf – 1950	
1999	Soutmansland		
2000–07	7de Laan	Bart Kruger	
2004	Snitch	Jan Pieter	
2006	Orion	Zatopek Van Heerden	
2006	Jozi-H	Drug Pusher 2006	Episode: "Crush"
2008	Feast of the Uninvited	Daantjie van Wyk	Episode: "A Map Reddens"
2010	House	Captain Vanderhoof	Episode: "A Pox on Our House"
2011	Kidnap & Rescue	Sam	Episode: "Hostage Rescue Team"
2013	Zoochosis	Scientist	Episode: "Case 05: Fate"
2015	The Americans	Eugene Venter	2 episodes (season 3)
2016	The 100	Titus	6 episodes; Recurring role (season 3)
2016	Hap and Leonard	Paco	5 episodes; Recurring role (season 1)
2017	Salamander	Jack Wang	Unaired pilot
2017	NCIS	Hendric Kruger	Episode: "Willoughby"
2017–18	The Flash	Clifford DeVoe / Thinker	Main cast (season 4); 13 episodes
2021	DAM	Bernoldus	Main Cast
2021	Sweet Tooth	General Abbot	12 episodes

==== Video games ====
Year	Title	Role	Notes
2015	Metal Gear Solid V: The Phantom Pain	Soldiers / Extras	Voice role

=== Other work ===
Year	Title	Role	Notes
2010	Jakhalsdans	Assistant director	Film, also actor
2011	Autumn and George	Editor	Short film
2011	Alien in the Park	Director of photography	Film
2012	Resolve: A Guide to Post Traumatic Growth	Story writer, editor, additional photography	Documentary
2013	Team Wheaties: Overcoming Physical Challenges	Director, editor	Video short
2013	Germination	Director, writer, executive producer, producer, editor, sound editor	Short film
2014	Body Mass	Editor, colourist, sound editor & designer	Short film
2014	Goat Cheese Dreams	Cinematographer	Short film
2015	A Whistle Blows/Fluit-Fluit	Director, editor	Television film
2015	Meeting Jenny	Editor, sound editor	Short film
2017	Avalanche	Executive producer, editor, sound editor	Film
