= Jeff Willette =

American computer graphics 3D animator (born 1971)

Jeff Willette (born April 29, 1971, in Big Rapids, Michigan) is an American computer graphics 3D animator. In 2008, Willette was nominated for a Visual Effects Society Award in the category of Outstanding Animated Character in a Live Action Broadcast Program or Commercial (shared with Matthew Hackett, Sean Andrew Faden, and Denis Gauthier; and in 2010 he was nominated for a Visual Effects Society Award in the category of Outstanding Compositing in a Broadcast Program or Commercial.

His numerous film and television credits for visual effects and computer animation includes:

- A Little Bit of Heaven (2011)
- The Sorcerer's Apprentice (2010)
- National Treasure: Book of Secrets (2007)
- Surf's Up (2007)
- The Adventures of Sharkboy and Lavagirl in 3-D (2005)
- Carnivàle (2003)
- Cast Away (2000)
- What Lies Beneath (2000)

In 2017, Jeff joined Venice, CA - based boutique Timber as Digital Effects Supervisor.
