= Children's and Family Emmy Award for Outstanding Supporting Performer =

Award for supporting performer in a television series

Children's and Family Emmy Award for Outstanding Supporting Performer in a Preschool, Children's or Young Teen Program
- Awarded for: Outstanding Supporting Performance in a Preschool, Children's or Young Teen Program
- Country: United States
- Presented by: Academy of Television Arts & Sciences
- First award: 2022
- Currently held by: Nonso Anozie, Sweet Tooth (2025)
- Website: theemmys.tv/childrens/

The Children's and Family Emmy Award for Outstanding Supporting Performer in a Preschool, Children's or Young Teen Program is an award that honors performances in both television series and made-for-television/streaming films. The category was established at the 1st Children's and Family Emmy Awards in 2022 and is open to performers of all genders. The inaugural recipient of the award was Nonso Anozie for his role as Tommy Jepperd in the Netflix series Sweet Tooth. The current holder of the award is Nonso Anozie, who won the 4th Children's and Family Emmy Awards for her role as Tommy Jepperd in the Netflix historical drama series Sweet Tooth, also making it his second win.

== Background ==
On November 17, 2021, the NATAS announced the creation of the Children's and Family Emmy Awards to recognize the best in children's and family television. The organization cited an "explosive growth in the quantity and quality of children’s and family programming" as justification for a dedicated ceremony. Many categories of the awards were previously presented at the Daytime Emmy Awards. Performers in programming aimed towards children and young people were previously honored with the Daytime Emmy Award for Outstanding Performer in Children's Programming, which was presented under various names however, following the announcement of the establishment of the Children's and Family Emmy Awards, these categories were discontinued.

The original name for the category was Outstanding Supporting Performance in a Preschool, Children's or Young Teen Program, and the award received its current name as of the 3rd Children's and Family Emmy Awards.

== Winners and nominations ==
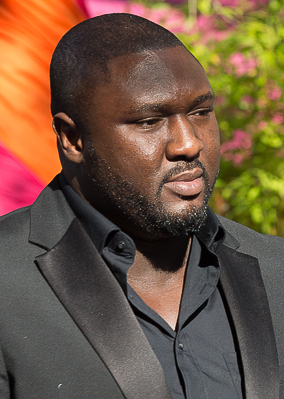
Inaugural recipient Nonso Anozie.

=== 2020s ===
Year	Actor	Role	Program	Network	Refs
2022 (1st)	Nonso Anozie	Tommy Jepperd	Sweet Tooth	Netflix	
2022 (1st)	Adeel Akhtar	Aditya Singh	Sweet Tooth	Netflix	
2022 (1st)	Yasmin Finney	Elle Argent	Heartstopper	Netflix	
2022 (1st)	William Gao	Tao Xu	Heartstopper	Netflix	
2022 (1st)	Lisa Kudrow	Aunt Heidi	Better Nate Than Ever	Disney+	
2023 (2nd)	Adeel Akhtar	Dr. Aditya Singh	Sweet Tooth	Netflix	
2023 (2nd)	Nonso Anozie	Tommy Jeppard	Sweet Tooth	Netflix	
2023 (2nd)	Kal Penn	Simon Choksi/Santa	The Santa Clauses	Disney+	
2023 (2nd)	Neil Sandilands	General Abbot	Sweet Tooth	Netflix	
2023 (2nd)	Catherine Zeta-Jones	Billie Pearce	National Treasure: Edge of History	Disney+	
2024 (3rd)	Amanda Lawrence	Matron Shipley	Malory Towers	BYU TV	
2024 (3rd)	Adam Copeland	Ares	Percy Jackson and the Olympians	Disney+	
2024 (3rd)	Elizabeth Mitchell	Carol/Mrs. Claus	The Santa Clauses	Disney+	
2024 (3rd)	Sarah Rafferty	Katherine Walter	My Life with the Walter Boys	Netflix	
2024 (3rd)	Lance Reddick	Zeus	Percy Jackson and the Olympians	Disney+	
2024 (3rd)	Eric Stonestreet	Magnus Antas/The Mad Santa	The Santa Clauses	Disney+	
2025 (4th)	Nonso Anozie	Tommy Jepperd	Sweet Tooth	Netflix	
2025 (4th)	Rosalind Chao	Helen Zhang	Sweet Tooth	Netflix	
2025 (4th)	Ellie Goldstein	Nancy	Malory Towers	BYUtv	
2025 (4th)	Stefania LaVie Owen	Bear	Sweet Tooth	Netflix	
2025 (4th)	Dara Reneé	Uliana	Descendants: The Rise of Red	Disney+	

== Programs with multiple awards ==
3 awards

- Sweet Tooth

== Performers with multiple wins ==
2 wins

- Nonso Anozie

== Performers with multiple nominations ==
3 nominations

- Nonso Anozie

2 nominations

- Adeel Akhtar

== Programs with multiple nominations ==
8 nominations

- Sweet Tooth

3 nominations

- The Santa Clauses

2 nominations

- Heartstopper
- Malory Towers
- Percy Jackson and the Olympians

== Networks with multiple nominations ==
11 nominations

- Netflix

8 nominations

- Disney+

2 nominations

- BYUtv

== Networks with multiple Wins ==
3 wins

- Netflix

== Superlatives ==
Superlative	Performer	Program	Year	Age
Oldest Nominee	Lance Reddick	Percy Jackson and the Olympians	2024	60
Youngest Nominee	Yasmin Finney	Heartstopper	2022	19
