= Nonso Anozie =

English actor (born 1978)

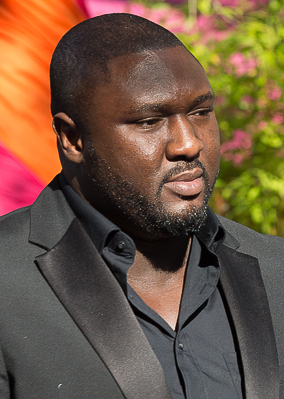
- Anozie at the premiere of Pan in 2015
- Born: 17 November 1978 (age 47); London, England
- Education: Central School of Speech and Drama
- Occupation: Actor
- Years active: 2007–present
- Children: 1

Nonso Anozie (/ˈnɒnsoʊ əˈnoʊzieɪ/; born 17 November 1978) is an English actor. On television, he is known for his roles as Xaro Xhoan Daxos in the HBO series Game of Thrones (2012), R.M. Renfield on the Sky series Dracula (2013), Abraham Kenyatta on the CBS series Zoo (2015–2017), and Tommy Jepperd on the Netflix series Sweet Tooth (2021–2024). For the latter, he won a Children's and Family Emmy Award and was nominated for a BAFTA award.

He led the film Cass (2008). His films since include RocknRolla (2008), The Grey (2011), Ender's Game (2013), Cinderella (2015), and Guava Island (2019).

== Early life and education ==
Anozie was born on 17 November 1978 in north London to Nigerian Igbo parents. Anozie attended St Aloysius College, Highgate. He graduated from the Central School of Speech and Drama in 2002, and in the summer of the same year he played the title role in William Shakespeare's King Lear, and won the Ian Charleson Award in 2004 for his performance in Othello.

== Career ==
Anozie was hired in 2006 to provide the voice for the armoured bear Iorek Byrnison in the film adaptation of Philip Pullman's Northern Lights. Anozie was replaced by Ian McKellen two months before the film was set to be released. The film's director, Chris Weitz, told Empire: "It was a studio decision ... You can understand why you would cast Ian McKellen for anything. But letting go of Nonso was one of the most painful experiences on this movie for me. I need to say about Nonso that he is one of the most promising and soulful young actors I have encountered in England and I've worked here for quite a bit now and he's actually in the next Mike Leigh [film] ... But it was, uh, that was kind of a dark day for me. I kinda wanna go out of my way to point out how much I love Nonso's work. And that's that."

Anozie played small roles as Think Tank in Guy Ritchie's film RocknRolla and Frank Mace in Joe Wright's Atonement. He played the lead in Cass, a 2008 British crime drama film recreating the life of Cass Pennant. In 2009, he appeared in the supporting cast of the BBC TV three-part 2003 Iraq War drama, Occupation, where he played a US Marine turned private military contractor. In 2011, he played Artus, a Zamoran pirate and close friend of Conan, in Conan the Barbarian. That year, he was also cast to play the role of Xaro Xhoan Daxos in the HBO series Game of Thrones and was cast as Jackson Burke in The Grey. He also plays the role of Samson in the History Channel's television miniseries The Bible. In 2013, Anozie appeared in the film Ender's Game as Sergeant Dap, and from 2013 to 2014 he played the role of Renfield on the NBC series Dracula.

In November 2014, Anozie was cast in the CBS summer drama Zoo, based on the novel by James Patterson and Michael Ledwidge. Zoo premiered on 30 June 2015.

Anozie's radio work includes the role of Joe in the 2011 BBC Radio 4 Classic Serial production of Edna Ferber's Show Boat.

In 2019, Anozie portrayed the antagonist, Red, in the Amazon Prime Video film Guava Island, starring Donald Glover and Rihanna.

== Personal life ==
Anozie has a son with a former partner. He is a practising Christian.

== Filmography ==
=== Films ===
Year	Title	Role	Notes
2007	The Last Legion	Batiatus	
2007	Atonement	Frank Mace	
2008	Happy-Go-Lucky	Ezra	
2008	Cass	Cass Pennant	
2008	RocknRolla	Tank	
2010	Nanny McPhee and the Big Bang	Sergeant Jeffreys	
2010	Brighton Rock	Dallow	
2010	I Am Slave		
2011	Conan the Barbarian	Artus	
2011	The Grey	Jackson Burke	
2013	Ender's Game	Sergeant Dap	
2014	Jack Ryan: Shadow Recruit	Embee Deng	
2014	Get Santa	Knuckles	
2015	Cinderella	Captain of the Guards	
2015	Pan	Bishop	
2018	7 Days in Entebbe	Idi Amin	
2018	All Is True	Actor Playing Aaron	
2019	Guava Island	Red	
2019	The Laundromat	Charles	
2020	Artemis Fowl	Domovoi Butler	
2020	Dragon Rider	Mighty Djinn (voice)	
2026	The Magic Faraway Tree	Moonface	
2026	Elsinore	National Theatre Window Banger	
TBA	Gundam †		Filming

=== Television ===
Year	Title	Role	Notes
2007	Prime Suspect 7: The Final Act	Robert	Episode: Part 1
2009	Occupation	Erik Lester	3 episodes
2011	Outcasts	Elijah	1 episode
2011	Stolen	Thomas Ekoku	TV movie
2012	Game of Thrones	Xaro Xhoan Daxos	5 episodes
2013	The Bible	Samson	Episode: "Homeland"
2013	Playhouse Presents	Chris	Episode: "The Pavement Psychologist"
2013–2014	Dracula	R.M. Renfield	Main cast; 10 episodes
2015	Tut	General Horemheb	Miniseries; 3 episodes
2015	Doctor Who	Hydroflax (voice)	Episode: "The Husbands of River Song"
2015–2017	Zoo	Abraham Kenyatta	Main cast
2016	A Midsummer Night's Dream	Oberon	TV film
2021–2024	Sweet Tooth	Tommy Jepperd	Main role
2021–2023	Ted Lasso	Ola Obisanya	3 episodes
2022	The Sandman	Wyvern (voice)	Episode: "Dream of a Thousand Cats"
2022	Hey Duggee	Animal Narrator (voice)	Episode: "The Mountain Badge"
2023	The Mandalorian	Gorian Shard (voice)	2 episodes

=== Video games ===
Year	Title	Role
2007	The Golden Compass	Iorek
2011	Brink	Captain Clinton Mokoena
2013	Remember Me	
2015	Dirty Bomb	Rhino, Sawbonez

== Awards ==
Award	Year	Category	Nominated work	Result	Ref.
Ian Charleson Awards	2004	Best classical stage performances in Britain by actors under age 30	Othello, Cheek by Jowl	Won	
Children's and Family Emmy Awards	2022	Outstanding Supporting Performance	Sweet Tooth	Won	
2022 British Academy Television Awards	2022	BAFTA TV Award for Best Supporting Actor	Sweet Tooth	Nominated	
Children's and Family Emmy Awards	2023	Outstanding Supporting Performance	Sweet Tooth	Nominated	
Children's and Family Emmy Awards	2025	Outstanding Supporting Performance	Sweet Tooth	Won	
