= Mulan (2020 film) =

Disney film by Niki Caro

- Official release poster
- Directed by: Niki Caro
- Screenplay by: Rick Jaffa Amanda Silver; Lauren Hynek; Elizabeth Martin
- Based on: Disney's Mulan by; Rita Hsiao; Chris Sanders; Philip LaZebnik; Raymond Singer; Eugenia Bostwick-Singer; Robert D. San Souci; Ballad of Mulan by Guo Maoqian
- Produced by: Chris Bender; Jake Weiner; Jason T. Reed
- Starring: Liu Yifei; Donnie Yen; Jason Scott Lee; Yoson An; Gong Li; Jet Li
- Cinematography: Mandy Walker
- Edited by: David Coulson
- Music by: Harry Gregson-Williams
- Production companies: Walt Disney Pictures; Jason T. Reed Productions; Good Fear Content
- Distributed by: Walt Disney Studios Motion Pictures
- Release dates: March 9, 2020 (Dolby Theatre); September 4, 2020 (United States)
- Running time: 115 minutes
- Country: United States
- Languages: English; Mandarin
- Budget: $200 million
- Box office: $69.9 million

Mulan is a 2020 American fantasy action drama film produced by Walt Disney Pictures. Directed by Niki Caro from a screenplay by Rick Jaffa, Amanda Silver, Lauren Hynek, and Elizabeth Martin, it is a live-action adaptation of Disney's 1998 animated film Mulan, itself based on the Chinese folklore story Ballad of Mulan. The film stars Liu Yifei in the title role, alongside Donnie Yen, Tzi Ma, Jason Scott Lee, Yoson An, Ron Yuan, Gong Li, and Jet Li in supporting roles. In the film, Hua Mulan, the eldest daughter of an honored warrior, masquerades as a man to take her ailing father's place during a general conscription to counter the Rouran army in Imperial China.

Plans for a live-action remake began in 2010 but the project stalled in development hell for most of the decade. Filming took place in New Zealand and China from August to November 2018. Over the course of production, the film was the subject of several controversies, including changes to the source material and filming in Xinjiang in light of the persecution of Uyghurs in China and Xinjiang re-education camps. The film also received criticism for its production team largely consisting of people of non-Chinese descent. This included the hiring of Caro, rather than an Asian director.

Mulan held its world premiere at the Dolby Theatre in Hollywood on March 9, 2020. The film was originally scheduled for a wide theatrical release later that month, but was cancelled in the United States after being delayed several times due to the COVID-19 pandemic. Subsequently, the film was released on September 4, 2020, by Disney+ for a premium fee known as Premier Access in countries where the service had launched. The film had a traditional theatrical release in countries without Disney+ where theaters had re-opened.

Due to its overall limited theatrical release as a result of the pandemic, the film was a box-office bomb, grossing $69.9 million at the box office against a production budget of $200 million. The film received generally positive reviews from Western, non-Asian critics, who praised the action sequences, costumes, and performances, but criticized the screenplay and editing. It received unfavorable reviews from fans of the original animated film, Chinese diaspora, and Chinese critics, who criticized the character development, its cultural and historical inaccuracies, and its depiction of Chinese people. At the 93rd Academy Awards and 26th Critics' Choice Awards, the film received nominations for its costume design and visual effects, as well as a Best Special Visual Effects nod at the 74th British Academy Film Awards.

== Plot ==
In Imperial China, Hua Mulan is an adventurous and active girl, much to the disappointment of her parents Zhou and Li, who hope that one day she will be wed to a good husband. As a young woman, Mulan is arranged to meet with a matchmaker to demonstrate her fitness as a future wife, but the matchmaker deems her a disgrace in front of her family after a mishap.

To the north, an imperial outpost is invaded by Rouran warriors, under the leadership of Böri Khan. They are assisted by the witch Xianniang, who uses her magic to pose as a surviving soldier and report the attack to the Emperor of China; he then issues a conscription decree ordering every family to contribute one man to fight Khan's forces. Imperial soldiers arrive in Mulan's village to enlist recruits and Zhou is forced to pledge his service as he has no sons, immediately falling over in front of the soldiers due to his crippled leg. Realizing that her father has no chance of survival, Mulan flees with his armor, horse, and sword to join in his place. Mulan arrives at the training camp, which is run by Commander Tung, an old comrade of Zhou. Alongside dozens of other inexperienced recruits, she ultimately becomes a trained soldier under his tutelage without exposing her true identity.

Böri Khan's army continues to advance, forcing Tung to end training early and send his battalion to fight. Mulan, separated from the battalion, is confronted by Xianniang, who mocks her for pretending to be a man. She attempts to kill Mulan, but her attacks are stopped by the leather with which Mulan's chest had been bound to hide her identity. Mulan removes her male disguise, returning to the battle just as the Rourans begin attacking her fellow troops with a trebuchet. Mulan uses discarded helmets and her archery skills to maneuver the trebuchet into firing on a snowy mountain, triggering an avalanche that buries the Rourans.

Mulan rides back to camp and rescues Chen Honghui, a soldier she befriended in camp. Mulan decides to reveal her gender to Commander Tung, who expels her from the army. Later, she is confronted by Xianniang, who reveals that she was also shunned by her people and fights for Böri Khan only because he would treat her as an equal. She also reveals that the attacks on the outposts have been a diversion, as Böri Khan's true plan is to capture and execute the Emperor for having his father killed. Risking execution, Mulan returns to her battalion to warn them of the impending capture. The soldiers she befriended stand up for her, and Tung decides to believe her, and allows her to lead a unit to the Emperor's palace.

Xianniang uses her magic to take the image of the Imperial Chancellor, and persuades the Emperor to accept Böri Khan's challenge to single combat, while removing the city guards from their posts. The guards are murdered, and the Rourans prepare to burn the Emperor alive. Mulan's unit distracts the Rourans while Mulan goes to save the Emperor. Böri Khan tries to snipe her with an arrow, but Xianniang, sympathetic to Mulan and disenchanted with the Khan, transforms into a hawk and sacrifices herself by intercepting the arrow. Mulan kills Böri Khan, but not before he disarms her and destroys her father's sword. She frees the Emperor, who offers to let her join his personal guard. She declines the offer to return to her village.

Mulan is reunited with her family. An emissary from the Emperor, under the leadership of Commander Tung, arrives to present Mulan with a new sword, while making a personal request that she join the Imperial Army as an officer.

== Cast ==
- Liu Yifei as Hua Mulan, the eldest daughter of Hua Zhou, who defies both tradition and the law by disguising herself as a man by the name of "Hua Jun", in order to enlist herself in the Imperial Army in place of her ailing father.
  - Liu Yifei reprised her role in the Mandarin-language dubbing of the film.
  - Crystal Rao as young Mulan.
- Donnie Yen as Commander Tung, the high-ranking commander of the Imperial Army and mentor to Mulan. Both Tung and Chen are based on Li Shang from the animated film.
- Gong Li as Xianniang, a powerful witch with shapeshifting abilities and an ally of Böri Khan. She often takes the shape of Khan's hawk, based on Hayabusa from the original film.
  - Gong reprised her role in the Mandarin-language dubbing of the film.
- Jason Scott Lee as Böri Khan, the ruthless leader of the Rouran army intent on avenging his father's death. Khan is based on Shan Yu from the animated film.
- Yoson An as Chen Honghui, a confident and ambitious recruit who joins Commander Tung's unit, and becomes Mulan's ally and love interest. Both Chen and Tung are based on Li Shang from the animated film.
- Jet Li as the Emperor of China, a wise and benevolent ruler, who orders the mobilization of troops within the Imperial Army via the conscription of one man from each household, to fight the invading Rouran army.
  - Li reprised his role in the Mandarin-language dubbing of the film.
- Tzi Ma as Hua Zhou, Mulan's father and a famed war veteran, who is now recalled to the Imperial Army despite his crippled leg.
- Rosalind Chao as Hua Li, Mulan's mother and Zhou's wife.
- Xana Tang as Hua Xiu, Mulan's younger sister, who suffers from arachnophobia the fear of spiders. The character was created for the film's plot because the filmmakers felt that "this added a broader emotional context and added more motivation for [Mulan's] character."
  - Elena Askin as young Xiu.
- Ron Yuan as Sergeant Qiang, the fiercely loyal second in command of the Imperial Regiment.
- Jun Yu as Cricket, a hapless recruit who joins Commander Tung's unit. Cricket is based on Cri-Kee, a cricket from the animated film.
- Jimmy Wong as Ling, a recruit who joins Commander Tung's unit.
- Chen Tang as Yao, a gruff recruit who joins Commander Tung's unit.
- Doua Moua as Chien-Po, a chubby recruit who joins Commander Tung's unit.
- Nelson Lee as the Chancellor, a member of the Emperor's council in charge of conscripting new recruits to join the Imperial army. The Chancellor is based on Chi-Fu from the animated film.
- Cheng Pei-pei as the Matchmaker, a stern and imposing woman who is responsible for arranging marriages and obnoxiously judges potential brides, particularly Mulan. This was Cheng's final film role before her death in 2024.
  - Cheng reprised her role in the Mandarin-language dubbing of the film.
- Arka Das as Red Fez, who is possessed by Xianniang to enter a palace which she and Böri Khan conquer

Additionally, Ming-Na Wen, the original voice of Mulan in the animated film, its sequel, and other projects, cameos as an esteemed guest who introduces Mulan to the Emperor. Utkarsh Ambudkar and Chum Ehelepola were cast as two con artists, Skatch and Ramtish, but their roles were cut from the final film.

== Production ==
=== Development ===
As early as 2010, Walt Disney Pictures had expressed interest in a live-action adaptation of the 1998 animated film Mulan with international Chinese star Zhang Ziyi, and Chuck Russell chosen as the director. That version of the project never came to fruition.

On March 30, 2015, The Hollywood Reporter reported that Disney had restarted development of the live-action adaptation with Chris Bender and J. C. Spink producing, while Elizabeth Martin and Lauren Hynek would be writing the screenplay. On October 4, 2016, it was announced that Rick Jaffa and Amanda Silver would rewrite the script, combining the Chinese ballad and the 1998 animated film, while Jason T. Reed would be producing the film along with Bender and Jake Weiner. On February 27, 2020, Reed said that Mulan's sidekick from the original film, Mushu, was removed due to the character's negative reception in China. Reed also said that in addition to drawing from the animated film and the original text, the filmmakers viewed adaptations of Ballad of Mulan produced in China for cinema and television. He stated that since "[t]he traditional Disney audience and the diaspora Asian audience viewed the movie in one way, and the traditional Chinese in China audience viewed a slightly different way," the filmmakers "dug in to try and make sure that [they are] addressing both of those audiences in a thoughtful way."

=== Casting ===
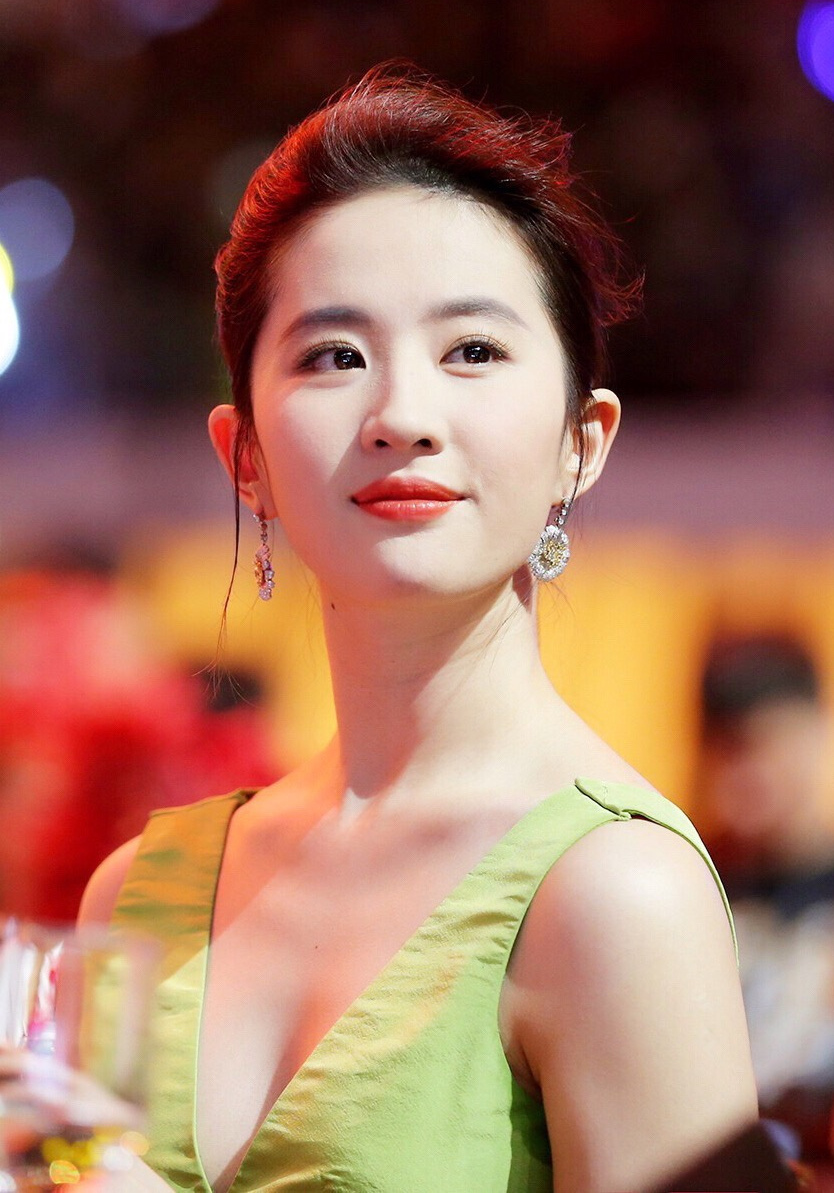
Yifei Liu plays Mulan in the remake.

Several 2010s Hollywood films were accused of whitewashing, and as soon as The Hollywood Reporter wrote that Disney was making a live-action adaptation of the 1998 film, Mulan came under intense scrutiny. An online petition titled "Tell Disney You Don't Want A Whitewashed Mulan!" received more than 100,000 signatures. On October 4, 2016, Disney announced that a global search for a Chinese actress to portray the title role was underway. A team of casting directors visited five continents and saw nearly 1,000 candidates for the role with criteria that required credible martial arts skills, the ability to speak clear English, and star quality.

On November 29, 2017, Chinese-American actress Liu Yifei was cast in the film to portray the titular role of Mulan. Many celebrated this as a win for diversity in Disney films. Further cast announcements for Donnie Yen, Gong Li, Jet Li, and Xana Tang were made in April 2018, Utkarsh Ambudkar and Ron Yuan in May, Yoson An and Chum Ehelepola in June, Jason Scott Lee in July, Tzi Ma, Rosalind Chao, Cheng Pei-Pei, Nelson Lee, Jimmy Wong and Doua Moua in August, and Chen Tang in September.

=== Director ===
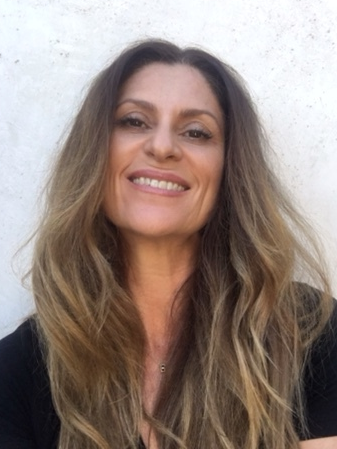
Niki Caro, the director of Mulan

Disney originally sought an Asian director. They first considered Ang Lee, the Taiwanese-born director and two-time Academy Award winner for Best Director. The Hollywood Reporter mentioned that Lee was approached but declined, on October 12, 2016. According to the report, published on November 22, 2016, he said that he would like to see an Asian director leading the film, but he had to decline because he was still obliged to promote his film Billy Lynn's Long Halftime Walk. Next, Disney met with Jiang Wen for the position; finally on February 14, 2017, New Zealander Niki Caro was hired as the director of the film, which made Mulan the second Disney film with a female director and a budget above $100 million, following A Wrinkle in Time.

=== Filming ===
Principal photography began on August 13, 2018, at locations in New Zealand and China and wrapped on November 25, 2018. According to actress Gong Li, the film's production budget was $290–300 million due to the "massive and ... unprecedented scale" of the sets, although the actual figure was later reported to be $200 million. The budget makes Mulan the most expensive film ever directed by a woman.

=== Post-production ===
The visual effects were provided by Sony Pictures Imageworks, Weta Digital, Framestore, and Image Engine. Seth Maury and Anders Langlands served as visual effects supervisors and Sean Andrew Faden served as production supervisor.

=== Music ===
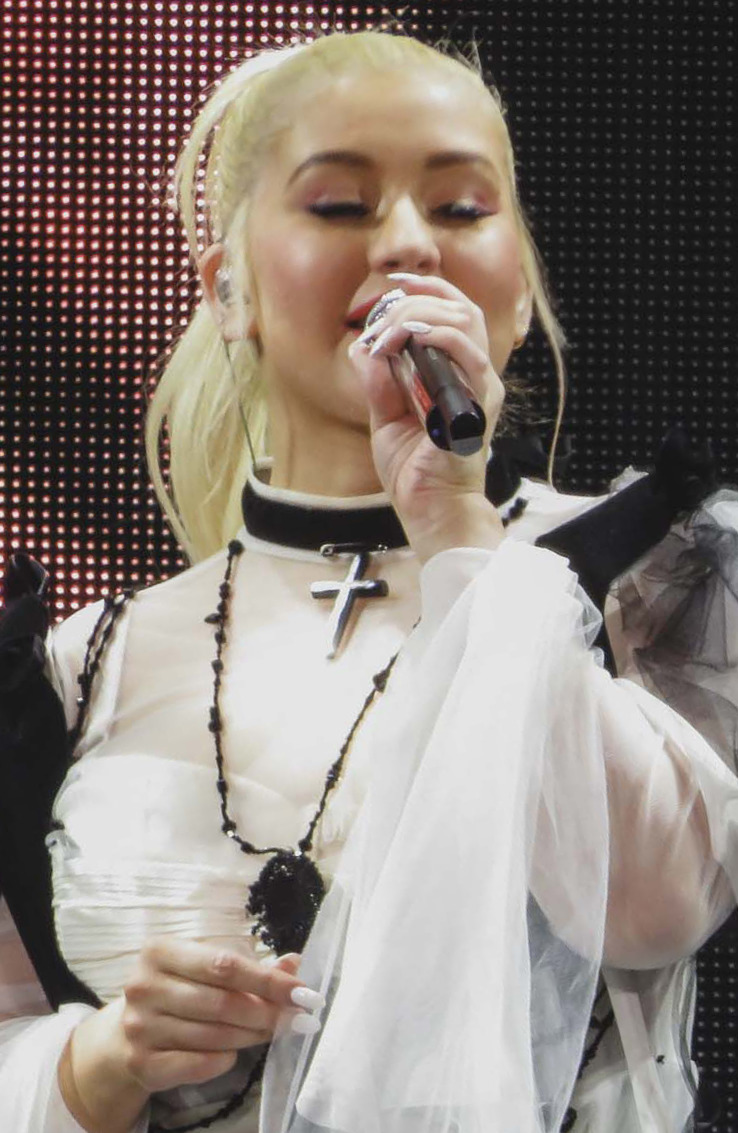
Christina Aguilera recorded two songs for the film including a remake of her song "Reflection" from the 1998 animated film Mulan.

Harry Gregson-Williams, who previously worked with Caro on The Zookeeper's Wife, composed the score with additional music by Tom Howe and Stephanie Economou. No songs from the original film were used in the remake, but Caro promised to "honour the music from the animation in a very significant way." Matthew Wilder, the writer of "Reflection", which was featured in the animated film, confirmed that the song "thematically plays a large part in the new movie throughout the score", and added that "there's a new version of 'Reflection'" as well. Christina Aguilera, who had recorded the rendition of "Reflection" used in the closing credits of original film, stated during a performance in The Xperience that she had recorded a new version, as well as other material, for the soundtrack of the remake.

"Loyal Brave True", performed by Aguilera, written by Jamie Hartman, Harry Gregson-Williams, Rosi Golan and Billy Crabtree, and produced by Hartman, was released as a single from the soundtrack album. The song was also released in Spanish, as "El Mejor Guerrero".

The soundtrack album was released by Walt Disney Records on September 4, 2020. A Mandarin version of "Reflections", titled "自己" (Zìjǐ) and performed by Liu, was also included on it.

== Marketing ==
On July 7, 2019, the official teaser trailer and the official teaser poster were released during the broadcast of the 2019 FIFA Women's World Cup Final. The teaser trailer was viewed 175.1 million times in its first 24 hours, including 52 million from China, making it the seventh most viewed trailer in that time period. On September 30, an exclusive photo featuring Liu as a soldier in the Imperial Army was released on Empire's upcoming Star Wars: The Rise of Skywalker issue. On October 24, a prequel novel written by writer Grace Lin was announced along with a preview being made available online. Entitled Mulan: Before the Sword, the novel was released on February 11, 2020. On November 4, a video clip filmed during a Toho cinema preview was leaked online, featuring new shots of Mulan as a warrior battling fiercely and taking off her hair band. On November 6, Liu was featured as one of the 25 stars of Next Gen Talent 2019 nominated by The Hollywood Reporter with two new studio stills released concurrently. As a result of delaying its original March 2020 release, film executives estimated that each time the film was delayed it cost Disney between $200,000 and $400,000 in marketing fees, a figure that could reach $5 million if it was moved out of the summer season altogether. Variety estimated that Disney spent around $50 million on global advertisement for the film, with Deadline Hollywood attributing $35 million of the marketing budget to TV ads.

A tie-in novelization of the film written by Elizabeth Rudnick was published by Disney Publishing Worldwide on February 11, 2020.

== Release ==
=== Theatrical and streaming ===
Mulan's world premiere was held at the Dolby Theatre in Hollywood on March 9, 2020. The film was originally scheduled for a theatrical release of November 2, 2018, but was delayed, with The Nutcracker and the Four Realms taking its slot. It was rescheduled for March 27, 2020, before being removed from the release calendar due to the COVID-19 pandemic. The film later rescheduled for July 24, 2020, taking the former slot of Jungle Cruise, and then was delayed again to August 21, 2020. On July 23, the film was removed from the release calendar once again.

On August 4, 2020, Disney announced that it was cancelling the film's theatrical release in the United States, and would instead premiere the film on Disney+ with Premier Access for a premium fee on September 4, 2020. Mulan was available for the purchase until November 2, 2020, and was made available for free to all subscribers on December 4. The film was not offered in France as a premium offering, instead releasing to Disney+ subscribers in the country for free at a later date. Speaking about the US$29.99 price point for the film in the United States, Disney CEO Bob Chapek said, "We're trying to establish a new premiere access window to capture [the] investment we got [in the film] ... From our research under a premiere access offering, not only does it get us revenue from our original transaction of PVOD, but it's a fairly large stimulus to sign up for Disney+." The premium fee was approximately US$26.00 in other countries when considering conversion rates for their native currencies. Unlike other premium VOD releases that feature a 48-hour viewing window, Mulan remains available to renters for as long as they stay subscribed to Disney+.

The film was still released theatrically in countries where theaters had re-opened, and do not have Disney+. In China, the film was released on September 11, 2020.

Mulan received a PG-13 rating from the Motion Picture Association, the first Disney live-action remake to be given such a rating.

=== Home media ===
Mulan was released by Walt Disney Studios Home Entertainment on Digital HD on October 6, 2020, followed by a DVD, Blu-ray, and Ultra HD Blu-ray release on November 10, 2020.

== Controversies ==
The film was marked by several controversies, relating to both production decisions as well as comments by individuals involved in the film. Disney CFO Christine McCarthy has stated that the controversies the film has caused have created "a lot of issues for [Disney]".

=== Filming in Xinjiang ===
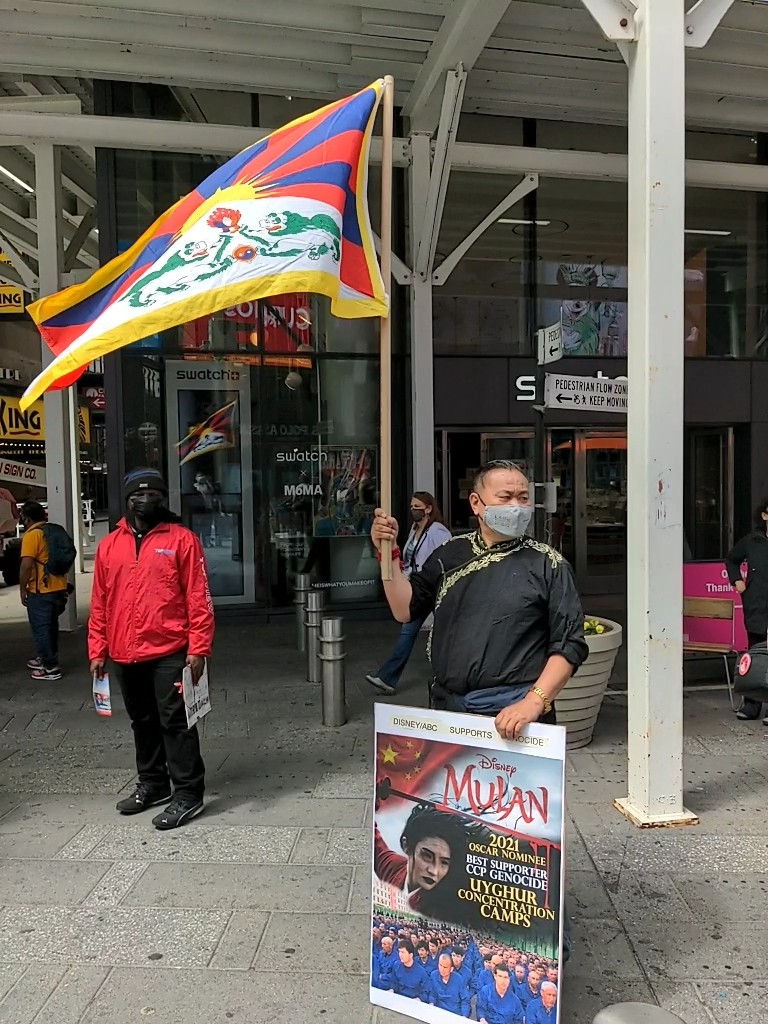
Tibetans protesting the film in Times Square. Protestors held placards criticizing the film's Oscar nominations and accusing Disney of ignoring human rights violations in Xinjiang.

Criticism has been directed at the fact that filming took place in the autonomous region of Xinjiang, where human rights abuses are taking place. At the end of the credits, the film gives special thanks to several government entities in Xinjiang, including the now-sanctioned Xinjiang Public Security Bureau in Turpan, and several local committees of the Publicity Department of the Chinese Communist Party. The public security bureau in Turpan was added to the U.S. Bureau of Industry and Security's Entity List in October 2019.

According to Reuters, after the controversy about the film's links with Xinjiang erupted overseas, the Chinese government ordered media outlets not to cover the release of Mulan. At a September 10 conference, Disney CFO Christine McCarthy said in response to the controversy that "almost the entirety" of the film had been shot in New Zealand, but that 20 Chinese locations were used to "accurately depict some of the unique landscape and geography of the country". US Senator Josh Hawley sent a letter to Disney CEO Bob Chapek asking, among other things, for clarification on Chinese government involvement in the film. The Human Rights Foundation also sent a letter to Chapek asking Disney to condemn human rights violations and consider donating some of the film's earnings to promote human rights in Xinjiang.

In September 2020, 135 British MPs signed a letter condemning China's human rights abuses, addressed to Liu Xiaoming, Chinese ambassador to the U.K. The petition was written in response to a BBC video detailing the production of Mulan. On October 7, 2020, British politician Iain Duncan Smith sent an email to Disney, criticizing the filming in Xinjiang. Disney defended it, saying, "it is standard practice across the film industry worldwide to acknowledge in a film's credits the cooperation, approvals, and assistance provided by various entities and individuals over the course of a film's production."

=== Lack of East Asians in production team ===
Disney was criticized because Mulan's production team was largely composed of people who were neither of Chinese descent nor otherwise Asian. This included the costume designer and screenwriter, but Disney received particular criticism for not hiring an Asian director. In a February 2020 interview with The Hollywood Reporter, Caro responded, "Although it's a critically important Chinese story and it's set in Chinese culture and history, there is another culture at play here, which is the culture of Disney, and that the director, whoever they were, needed to be able to handle both—and here I am." In an August 2020 interview with Film School Rejects, Caro added, "Firstly, I resist the idea that you tell somebody who can tell what story. That sounds a little bit like censorship to me. An artist will express themselves, and the burden of responsibility is on the art. That will be judged—and should be judged. The other side of it is that more diverse people need to be allowed to tell stories. That's what it comes down to. The people who are hired for all kinds of stories need to be more diverse. It can't just be white people being hired to make movies, no matter what the subject matter is. Our culture is going to be richer for the more diversity there is, and the art, the movies, the television, it will be better. The more this conversation is being had, the more that diverse artists are given opportunities."

=== Li Shang ===
In a February 27, 2020, interview, film producer Jason T. Reed said that Mulan's love interest from the original film, Captain Li Shang, was dropped in response to the MeToo movement. In his statement, he explained that "having a commanding officer that is also the sexual love interest was very uncomfortable and we didn't think it was appropriate". The reasoning for not including the character was met with social media backlash from fans of the original film and members of the LGBTQ community, who deemed Shang's relationship with Mulan's male alter ego Ping to be bisexual. Reed was initially surprised by criticism of Shang's removal, but acknowledged that the character had become an "LGBTQ icon", and clarified that Shang's role would be served by two new characters, Commander Tung and Chen Honghui.

In September 2020, Cynthia Vinney of CBR wrote that Honghui's interactions with Mulan were "more homoerotic" than Shang's in the animated version and likewise "can be read as bisexual". Lauren Puckett of Harper's Bazaar wrote "Some fans understood and agreed with the #MeToo argument. Others found it offensive, arguing that Shang would never use his commanding position to coerce a woman into romance. He waited until after she was no longer under his command to pursue any sort of romantic relationship. And anyway, it was Mulan who had the crush on him! [...] Despite [Honghui's] attraction, he hardly has the same respect for her that brave and beautiful Li Shang did."

=== Liu's comments on Hong Kong ===
A call to boycott the film began when Liu reshared an image posted by the People's Daily, an official newspaper of the Chinese Communist Party. The image included a quote from Chinese reporter Fu Guohao, who worked for the state-owned tabloid Global Times and was assaulted by protesters during the 2019–2020 Hong Kong protests: "I support Hong Kong police. You can beat me now." The post added in English: "What a shame for Hong Kong." This sparked international controversy, with Liu being accused of supporting police brutality in Hong Kong. The hashtag #BoycottMulan started trending. As a result of the controversy, Liu did not appear at the 2019 D23 Expo, leaving only Caro to present the film at the panel.

== Reception ==
=== Premium video on demand ===
Variety estimated Mulan would need to be rented by about 8.4 million subscribers (13.8%) in order to break even. On the weekend of the film's release, the Disney+ app was downloaded 68% more than the past weeks' total, similar to the 72% spike upon Hamilton's release that July. Deadline Hollywood reported that industry sources with knowledge of the situation "are figuring that Disney may not have earned great presales" and that they could put Mulan on a third-party service before the December release. However, following the film's opening weekend, Business Insider reported it had been viewed by 1.12 million households (only including users renting with TV-connected devices), which would result in $33.5 million in sales for Disney. Yahoo! Finance then reported that, according to analytics research firm 7Park Data, nearly 29% of U.S. Disney+ subscribers that accessed the app from September 1 to 12 purchased Mulan, which in the best-case scenario would result in $261 million for Disney. 7Park Data co-founder Brian Lichtenberger stated Yahoo! Finance overestimated Mulan's revenue, as their figures were for accounts active during that period and not the total subscriber base, and clarified that 10.3% of all accounts purchased the film, with U.S. revenue estimated to be $62–93 million; Yahoo! Finance amended their article to reflect this.

According to Nielsen ratings, Mulan was one of the top ten most-watched streams in the United States between August 31 and September 6, 2020. During its opening weekend between September 4–6, Mulan drew 525 million streaming minutes in the United States.

In its first weekend of being available on other digital platforms, Mulan was the top-rented film on FandangoNow, and third on both Apple TV and Google Play. In its second weekend in the open market, the film placed second at Fandango, fourth on Google Play, and fifth at Apple TV. In October 2020, The Hollywood Reporter said the film was the most popular PVOD title amid the COVID-19 pandemic, and the following month Variety reported the film was the sixth-most watched straight-to-streaming title of 2020 up to that point.

=== Box office ===
Mulan was a box office bomb. It grossed $5.9 million from nine countries in its international opening weekend, including $1.2 million in Thailand and $700,000 in Singapore, both of which were the highest debuts of 2020 in the respective countries. It also made $800,000 in the United Arab Emirates, and the same amount in Saudi Arabia. In its second weekend, the film made $29.1 million from 17 countries, including $1.8 million in Russia, and finished first in Ukraine, Hungary, Serbia, and South Africa. Through three weekends, the film grossed $57 million internationally.

The film made $23.2 million on its opening weekend in China, a low figure but a 23% improvement upon Aladdin's debut the year before. Several factors were cited as contributing to the film's muted performance, including the announcement of the official Chinese release date only days before the premiere, giving little chance to build a strong marketing campaign; the prior release on Disney+, resulting in pirated copies being available online; a lack of local press coverage in order to avoid drawing attention to the controversy over the film having been partially shot in the Xinjiang region; and poor fan reception on sites such as Maoyan and Douban. The revenue of the film fell 72% in its second weekend of release in the country, to $6.5 million.

=== Critical response ===
Review aggregator Rotten Tomatoes reports that 72% of 329 critic reviews were positive, with an average rating of 6.7/10. The site's critical consensus read, "It could have told its classic story with greater depth, but the live-action Mulan is a visual marvel that serves as a stirring update to its animated predecessor." On Metacritic, the film has a weighted average score of 66 out of 100 based on 52 critics, indicating "generally favorable reviews".

Richard Roeper of the Chicago Sun-Times gave the film three and a half out of four stars, praising the "fine cast, exciting action and spectacular visuals" and writing, "This is such a great-looking film, with amazing set pieces and dazzling action and colors so vibrant they would dazzle a Crayola factory, it will still play well on your home monitor. There are so many gorgeous shades of orange and magenta, blue and yellow, it's as if we're seeing these colors for the first time." Kate Erbland of IndieWire gave the film a B+, calling it a "remarkable action epic that carves its own path" and writing, "Mulan is perhaps the best example of how to marry the original with something fresh. The Ballad of Mulan has always been an epic-scale story about the power of being yourself in a world not ready to accept that, a tale that will likely always have resonance."

Leah Greenblatt of Entertainment Weekly gave the film a B+ and described it as "a classic hero(ine)'s tale, exhilarating in its elaborate set pieces and large-scale ambitions even when the smaller human story within it sometimes falls short." Writing for Variety, Peter Debruge said, "On one hand, the result isn't immediately recognizable as 'a Disney movie,' but neither does it establish its own narrative or visual signature, the way Tarantino did when remixing Asian influences for Kill Bill. This is pure pastiche, as Caro and her crew shamelessly pilfer from kung fu, Fifth Generation and Hong Kong action movies, incorporating anime and Bollywood touches as well."

Mick LaSalle of the San Francisco Chronicle wrote, "Mulan is a spirit lifter, and though it doesn't arrive as planned, it could not arrive at a better time", saying, "Throughout Mulan, there are shots of such visual splendor that viewers will catch their breath. In one, the morning mist clears and reveals an army in the distance, with its flags and colors, a frightening yet strangely beautiful sight." Justin Chang of the Los Angeles Times wrote, "Mulan is a heroic muddle, one that elicits both a disappointed sigh and an appreciative nod. It lays down a marker of progress achieved and progress to come."

Aja Romano of Vox wrote, "The Mulan remake jettisons everything great about Disney's animated classic and delivers nothing new" and "Mulan's few bright spots can't save it from clunky writing".

Walter Chaw of Film Freak Central gave the film half a star out of four, writing, "[E]verything about this Mulan is ironic accidentally. Whatever its intentions, its execution and the circumstances of its creation are in opposition to them. It's a feminist tract that enforces male notions of value; a call to arms that fights for the wrong side of our current history; and a proud statement of national identity that celebrates the Nation of Disney as opposed to China. It's majestically painful as a representation of how white people view Asians and, yes, it would be different had an Asian person been allowed to direct the film."

Grace Wong of the Chicago Tribune wrote, "The animated Mulan meant so much to me, and the character I grew up loving taught me that being loyal, brave and true means standing up for what you believe in, no matter the cost. Today, I believe Mulan would be on the side of the Hong Kong protesters, who also fight to have independence, their voices heard and their lives valued. I hoped to see these threads in the new iteration. Instead we got an almost unrecognizable, twisted reflection of the original."

Hamilton College professor Zhuoyi Wang argues that the film "is not, as many believe, just another Disney film suffering from simple artistic inability, cultural insensitivity, or political injustice, but a window into the tension-ridden intersectionality of the gender, sexual, racial, cultural, and political issues that shape the production and reception of today's cross-cultural films. [...] The film made significant compromises between its goals of cultural appropriateness, progressive feminism, and monetary success. Although it eventually failed to satisfactorily resolve these at times conflicting missions, it still achieved important progress in addressing some serious gender and cultural problems in Mulan's contemporary intertextual metamorphosis, especially those introduced by the Disney animation."

==== In China ====
Mulan was poorly received by Chinese critics and audiences. The film scored 4.7 out of 10 on the rating site Douban after its debut. Reviewers on Douban contended that the film had flat characters and a bland story with details that did not make sense. Many people also appeared unsatisfied with how the film handles certain Chinese cultural elements. One of the more common complaints about the film is its treatment of qi. Qi is a traditional idea in martial arts and Chinese medicine concerning a person's energy flow. But in Mulan, qi becomes a magical power that the eponymous heroine possesses. That power is limited by dishonesty, keeping Mulan from realizing her full potential until she strips away her disguise as a man. Other Chinese viewers complained about some of the characters' makeup, saying that it reflects Western stereotypes of China, rather than being a reflection of actual Chinese culture.

Yanni Chow and Carol Mang of Reuters wrote that the film had "a lacklustre reception in Hong Kong" amidst calls from pro-democracy activists for a boycott.

=== Accolades ===
Award	Date of ceremony	Category	Recipients	Result	Ref.
Academy Awards	April 25, 2021	Best Costume Design	Bina Daigeler	Nominated	
Academy Awards	April 25, 2021	Best Visual Effects	Sean Faden, Anders Langlands, Seth Maury and Steve Ingram	Nominated	
Art Directors Guild Awards	April 10, 2021	Excellence in Production Design for a Period Film	Grant Major	Nominated	
British Academy Film Awards	April 11, 2021	Best Special Visual Effects	Sean Faden, Steve Ingram, Anders Langlands and Seth Maury	Nominated	
Casting Society of America	April 15, 2021	Feature Big Budget – Drama	Debra Zane, PoPing AuYeung, and Dylan Jury	Nominated	
Chicago Indie Critics Awards	January 3, 2021	Best Original Song	"Loyal Brave True"	Nominated	
Costume Designers Guild Awards	April 13, 2021	Excellence in Sci-Fi/Fantasy Film	Bina Daigeler	Won	
Critics' Choice Movie Awards	March 7, 2021	Best Costume Design	Bina Daigeler	Nominated	
Critics' Choice Movie Awards	March 7, 2021	Best Visual Effects	Mulan	Nominated	
Critics' Choice Super Awards	January 10, 2021	Best Action Movie	Mulan	Nominated	
Critics' Choice Super Awards	January 10, 2021	Best Actress In An Action Movie	Yifei Liu	Nominated	
Golden Trailer Awards	July 22, 2021	Best Animation/Family	"True", Walt Disney Studios	Nominated	
Golden Trailer Awards	July 22, 2021	Best Fantasy Adventure	"True", Walt Disney Studios	Nominated	
Golden Trailer Awards	July 22, 2021	Best Fantasy Adventure	"Warrior", Walt Disney Studios	Nominated	
Golden Trailer Awards	July 22, 2021	Best Fantasy Adventure TV Spot	"Exhale", Walt Disney Studios	Nominated	
Golden Trailer Awards	July 22, 2021	Best Fantasy Adventure TV Spot	"Oath", Walt Disney Studios	Nominated	
Hollywood Professional Association	November 19, 2020	Outstanding Color Grading – Theatrical Feature	Natasha Leonnet, Company 3, EFilm	Nominated	
Hollywood Professional Association	November 19, 2020	Outstanding Visual Effects – Theatrical Feature	Sean Andrew Faden, Diana Giorgiutti, Anders Langlands, Seth Maury, Hubert Maston, Walt Disney Studios Motion Pictures	Nominated	
Make-Up Artists and Hair Stylists Guild Awards	April 3, 2021	Best Period and/or Character Make-Up	Denise Kum, Rick Findlater, Georgia Lockhart-Adams, James MacKinnon	Nominated	
Make-Up Artists and Hair Stylists Guild Awards	April 3, 2021	Best Period and/or Character Hair	Denise Kum, Rick Findlater, Georgia Lockhart-Adams, Terry Baliel	Nominated	
Make-Up Artists and Hair Stylists Guild Awards	April 3, 2021	Best Special Makeup Effects	Denise Kum, Chris Fitzpatrick	Nominated	
Nickelodeon Kids' Choice Awards	March 13, 2021	Favorite Movie	Mulan	Nominated	
Nickelodeon Kids' Choice Awards	March 13, 2021	Favorite Movie Actress	Yifei Liu	Nominated	
Online Film & Television Association Awards	April 4, 2021	Best Adapted Song	"Reflection"	Nominated	
People's Choice Awards	November 15, 2020	The Action Movie of 2020	Mulan	Won	
People's Choice Awards	November 15, 2020	Soundtrack Song of the Year	"Loyal Brave True"	Nominated	
PopSugar UK Awards	December 11, 2020	Best Nostalgic Moments of the Year	"Reflection"	Won	
Satellite Awards	February 15, 2021	Best Art Direction and Production Design	Grant Major and Anne Kuljian	Nominated	
Satellite Awards	February 15, 2021	Best Costume Design	Bina Daigeler	Nominated	
Satellite Awards	February 15, 2021	Best Visual Effects	Sean Faden	Nominated	
Saturn Awards	October 26, 2021	Best Action or Adventure Film	Mulan	Won	
Saturn Awards	October 26, 2021	Best Actress	Yifei Liu	Nominated	
Saturn Awards	October 26, 2021	Best Supporting Actor	Donnie Yen	Nominated	
Saturn Awards	October 26, 2021	Best Director	Niki Caro	Nominated	
Saturn Awards	October 26, 2021	Best Writing	Rick Jaffa and Amanda Silver, Lauren Hynek, Elizabeth Martin	Nominated	
Saturn Awards	October 26, 2021	Best Costume Design	Bina Daigeler	Won	
Screen Actors Guild Awards	April 4, 2021	Outstanding Performance by a Stunt Ensemble in a Motion Picture	Mulan	Nominated	
Visual Effects Society Awards	April 6, 2021	Outstanding Created Environment in a Photoreal Feature	Jeremy Fort, Matt Fitzgerald, Ben Walker, Adrian Vercoe (for Imperial City)	Won	
Visual Effects Society Awards	April 6, 2021	Outstanding Effects Simulations in a Photoreal Feature	Theo Vandernoot, Sandra Balej, James Carson, Yuri Rudakov	Nominated	
Visual Effects Society Awards	April 6, 2021	Outstanding Compositing in a Photoreal Feature	Christoph Salzmann, Beck Veitch, Joerg Bruemmer, Indah Maretha	Nominated	

== Sequel ==
In April 2020, months before the film's eventual September 2020 release date, it was reported that a Mulan sequel is in development with Chris Bender, Jason T. Reed, and Jake Weiner returning as producers. However, development has stalled throughout the years and no reports regarding the sequel has surfaced, as of 2026.
