= Sweet Tooth (TV series) =

2021 American fantasy drama television series

- Genre: Fantasy drama; Post-apocalyptic
- Based on: Sweet Tooth by Jeff Lemire
- Developed by: Jim Mickle
- Showrunners: Jim Mickle; Beth Schwartz
- Starring: Nonso Anozie; Christian Convery; Adeel Akhtar; Stefania LaVie Owen; Dania Ramirez; Aliza Vellani; James Brolin; Will Forte; Naledi Murray; Neil Sandilands; Marlon Williams; Yonas Kibreab; Christopher Sean Cooper Jr.; Amy Seimetz; Rosalind Chao; Kelly Marie Tran; Cara Gee; Ayazhan Dalabayeva
- Music by: Jeff Grace
- Country of origin: United States
- Original language: English
- No. of seasons: 3
- No. of episodes: 24

Production
- Executive producers: Jim Mickle; Susan Downey & Robert Downey Jr.; Amanda Burrell; Linda Moran; Beth Schwartz
- Producers: Evan Moore; Mel Turner; Christina Ham
- Production location: New Zealand
- Cinematography: Dave Garbett; Aaron Moreton; John Cavill; Rob Marsh; Andrew Stroud
- Editors: Michael Berenbaum; Shawn Paper; John Dietrick; David Bilow; Nathan D. Gunn
- Running time: 37–59 minutes
- Production companies: Nightshade; Team Downey; DC Entertainment; Warner Bros. Television

Original release
- Network: Netflix
- Release: June 4, 2021 – June 6, 2024

Sweet Tooth is an American fantasy drama television series developed by Jim Mickle. It is based on the comic book series created by Jeff Lemire and published by DC Comics' Vertigo imprint. The series premiered on Netflix in June 2021, with a second season released in April 2023, and a third and final season announced the following month. The third season premiered on June 6, 2024.

Development on the show began in 2018 at Hulu. By 2020, the series had moved to Netflix. Filming took place in New Zealand. Nonso Anozie, Christian Convery, Adeel Akhtar, Stefania LaVie Owen, Dania Ramirez, Aliza Vellani, Will Forte, Neil Sandilands, Marlon Williams, Amy Seimetz, Rosalind Chao, Kelly Marie Tran, and Cara Gee star while James Brolin provides the narration.

Sweet Tooth is set in a world in which a virus has killed a majority of the world's human population, coinciding with the emergence of hybrid babies that are born with animal characteristics. The main story follows Gus (played by Convery), a naïve 10-year-old deer hybrid, who sets out to find his mother after his father's death.

The series has received critical acclaim, earning 34 nominations across its first three seasons at the Children's and Family Emmy Awards, winning eight.

== Premise ==
Ten years ago occurred "The Great Crumble", the collapse of society due to a viral pandemic of a disease known as the Sick (or the H5G9 virus), wiping out most of the world's human population. From the start of The Crumble on, hybrid babies are the norm with animal body parts and other characteristics.

Unsure whether hybrids are the cause of the virus or a result of it, many humans fear and hunt them. Gus, a part-deer hybrid, lives in the wilderness with his father whom he calls "Pubba". Pubba dies from the Sick when Gus is nine years old. The boy discovers a box his father buried beneath a tree that contains paraphernalia from before The Great Crumble, but more importantly, a photograph of his mother with the word "Colorado" written on it.

In frustration, Gus accidentally starts a fire, which signals hunters who try to kill him. He is saved by Tommy Jepperd, a lone traveler also drawn by the fire. Jepperd tries to leave Gus, but the boy insists that he escort him to Colorado to find his mother, and Jepperd (nicknamed "Big Man" by Gus) relents.

The story also follows multiple side stories including: Dr. Aditya Singh as he tries to find a cure for the Sick, which his wife has lived with for years; Bear, who is the leader and founder of the Animal Army which saves and protects hybrids and all the while looking for her sister; Aimee Eden, a former therapist whose sanctuary for hybrids is called "The Preserve".

== Cast ==
=== Main ===
- Nonso Anozie as Tommy Jepperd, a traveler and reformed hunter of hybrids who saves Gus from poachers and reluctantly accompanies him on his journey to find his mother. Gus refers to him simply as "Big Man". He was a famous professional football player before the H5G9 virus outbreak.
- Christian Convery as Gus, a sheltered and naïve 10-year-old half-human, half-deer boy who wants to find his mother. Tommy refers to Gus as "Sweet Tooth" due to his obsession with candies and other sugary items. Nixon Bingley portrays 7-year-old Gus and River Jarvis portrays 4-year-old Gus.
- Adeel Akhtar as Dr. Aditya Singh, a doctor who is desperate to find the cure for the disease caused by the H5G9 virus in order to cure his infected wife Rani.
- Stefania LaVie Owen as Bear, the leader and founder of the Animal Army who saves hybrids. It is later revealed that her name is Rebecca "Becky" Walker.
- Dania Ramirez as Aimee Eden (seasons 1–2), a former therapist who creates a safe haven for hybrids called The Preserve.
- Aliza Vellani as Rani Singh (seasons 1–2), Dr. Aditya Singh's wife who has the Sick.
- James Brolin as the narrator, who is later revealed as the older Gus by the end of the final season.
- Will Forte as Pubba (seasons 1 and 3), Gus's father who raised him in a secluded cabin in Yellowstone National Park to protect him from the outside world of hatred towards hybrids. It is later revealed that his name is Richard Fox and that he was a janitor at Fort Smith Labs in Goss Grove, Colorado. (Note: Will Forte is only credited for the episodes he appears in.)
- Naledi Murray as Wendy (seasons 2–3; recurring season 1), Aimee's adopted hybrid daughter who is half-pig and half-human. Aimee often refers to her as "Pigtail". She is the biological daughter of Bear's foster parents. Banke Moss portrays an older Wendy.
- Neil Sandilands as General Abbot (season 2; recurring season 1), the leader of the Last Men who hunts hybrids. It is later revealed that his first name is Douglas.
- Marlon Williams as Johnny Abbot (season 2; co-starring season 1), General Abbot's younger brother.
- Yonas Kibreab as Finn Fox (season 2), a hybrid who is half-fox and half-human.
- Christopher Sean Cooper Jr. as Teddy Turtle (season 2), a hybrid who is half-turtle and half-human.
- Amy Seimetz as Birdie (season 3; recurring season 1–2), a woman whom Gus assumes is his mother. It is later revealed that her name is Gertrude Miller, a geneticist at Fort Smith Labs before the Great Crumble. She hands Gus over to Pubba to protect him because she knew that the world would eventually begin hunting Gus and his kind down.
- Rosalind Chao as Helen Zhang (season 3; guest season 2), a warlord and a member of The Three. She's also the mother of Rosie and Ginger.
- Kelly Marie Tran as Rosie Zhang (season 3), the daughter of Helen, the sister of Ginger, and mother of four half-wolf hybrids who is pursuing Gus.
- Louise Jiang as Ginger Zhang (season 3), the daughter of Helen, the sister of Rosie, and the mother of a newborn half-seal hybrid.
- Cara Gee as Siana (season 3), a friend of Birdie who works at an Alaskan outpost.
- Ayazhan Dalabayeva as Nuka (season 3), the daughter of Siana who is half-human and half-arctic fox.

=== Recurring ===
- Sarah Peirse as Dr. Gladys Bell (season 1), a doctor who is dying of cancer and leaves her research of finding a cure for the Sick to Dr. Singh. It is later revealed that she does not have cancer, but is refusing to continue her research, much to General Abbot's dismay. This leads to Abbot having Bell executed by poison.

== Episodes ==
=== Series overview ===
Season	Episodes	Originally released
1	8	June 4, 2021
2	8	April 27, 2023
3	8	June 6, 2024

=== Season 1 (2021) ===
No. overall	No. in season	Title	Directed by	Written by	Original release date	Prod. code
1	1	"Out of the Deep Woods"	Jim Mickle	Jim Mickle	June 4, 2021	T15.10153
In the near future, society collapses in an event known as the Great Crumble following the emergence of both a virus known as the Sick and half-human and half-animal babies known as hybrids. Before this, a man runs away into Yellowstone National Park with his deer hybrid baby, Gus. Over the next ten years, Gus's father, who Gus refers to as "Pubba", raises Gus in a secure base in the deep woods, teaching him to stay inside the fenced environment and warning him of the dangers of the outside world. One year after losing Pubba to the Sick, Gus discovers a safe containing a photo of Birdie, a woman from Colorado whom he believes is his mother. While attempting to leave the woods to look for her, Gus is captured by poachers only to be quickly saved by a mysterious loner. While distrusting of this "Big Man" at first, Gus eventually explains his plan to find Birdie in Colorado and asks him for his help.
2	2	"Sorry About All the Dead People"	Jim Mickle	Jim Mickle & Beth Schwartz	June 4, 2021	T13.22302
A few weeks after the Great Crumble, a therapist named Aimee Eden heads out into the deserted city and makes a home at the local zoo. Shortly after settling in, Aimee discovers a hybrid pig baby outside the Zoo. Back in the present, Gus, after eating all of Big Man's food, leads them to a Visitor Center from where he can smell food, where they find a family living there. It is revealed that Big Man is Tommy Jepperd: a former football player and a former member of the Last Men; a group of people who hunt hybrids. Meanwhile, a doctor named Aditya Singh temporarily treats his infected wife Rani through experimental medicine provided by Dr. Gladys Bell, who wants him to take over her work as she is dying from terminal cancer. Jepperd begins to think the family at the Center may be better company for Gus. While attempting to leave that night, the Center is attacked by Last Men who Jepperd manages to kill. Fearing for their safety, the family ask Jepperd and Gus to leave. Jepperd agrees to part ways with Gus after helping him get to Colorado.
3	3	"Weird Deer S**t"	Alexis Ostrander	Michael R. Perry	June 4, 2021	T13.22303
Gus and Jepperd continue on foot to the Market where there is a train that will take Gus to Colorado. Jepperd disguises Gus as a human so they can get him on the train, but while purchasing him a ticket Gus wanders off and meets a girl in the Market who comforts him when he panics. Dr. Singh takes over for Dr. Bell and starts working with the Last Men who provide him with supplies. He and Rani reluctantly attend a party where the host Doug is discovered to be infected. To prevent the spread of the Sick, the neighborhood binds Doug and sets his house on fire. As he is about to board the train, Gus smells Jepperd's medicine among the boxes being loaded, so they steal the supplies but are caught and Gus is exposed as a hybrid. While transporting the two through the forest, the Last Men are ambushed by teenagers dressed as animals who kill them and rescue Gus and Jepperd. The leader, dressed as a bear, reveals herself as the girl from the Market.
4	4	"Secret Sauce"	Toa Fraser	Justin Boyd & Haley Harris	June 4, 2021	T13.22304
The girl, named Bear, takes Gus to their home in an abandoned theme park while taking Jepperd prisoner. She tells him about how she is the leader of the Animal Army that has vowed to protect hybrids at all costs. Singh continues to try to make medicine for his wife, but is unsuccessful as he needs a live hybrid. Aimee raises the hybrid baby Wendy as her own in the city zoo, scavenging and avoiding Last Men. One night, Aimee discovers that Wendy has been fostering another hybrid named Bobby. She asks Aimee if they can keep him. Bear reveals to Gus that Jepperd was once a Last Man and has hurt hybrids, but Gus doesn't care as he says Jepperd is his friend. At the execution of Jepperd, Bear reveals she will not carry out the execution for Gus's sake. Furious, her second-in-command Tiger initiates a coup. During the chaos, Jepperd and Gus escape, with Bear following as she abandons the Animal Army. The Singh's nosey neighbor Nancie discovers Rani has the Sick and plans to expose her, but is kicked to death by their horse, forcing the Singhs to hide her body.
5	5	"What's in the Freezer?"	Robyn Grace	Christina Ham	June 4, 2021	T13.22305
Dr. Bell is confronted by the Last Men's leader General Abbot, revealing she had faked her illness out of refusal to continue harming the hybrids. The general has her executed after learning where her notebook is. Jepperd thanks Gus for having his back at the Animal Army camp and says he will accompany him to Colorado. Bear finds Gus and Jepperd and gives them some information regarding Birdie's last known address. During their journey to a train bound for Colorado, Gus falls into a valley filled with purple flowers that accompany the Sick. While unconscious, Gus has a vision of Pubba before Jepperd and Bear rescue Gus from the flowers. Aimee and Wendy continue to build the Preserve for hybrids which the Last Men find and tag. The neighborhood discovers Nancie's corpse in the clinic's freezer, but Singh tries to convince them Nancie was Sick. When Rani starts showing symptoms, the neighborhood binds them inside their home and sets it aflame before the Last Men and General Abbot arrive and save them.
6	6	"Stranger Danger on a Train"	Jim Mickle	Noah Griffith & Daniel Stewart	June 4, 2021	T13.22306
Jepperd, Bear, and Gus manage to board the moving train to Colorado. The Singhs bluff that Dr. Singh is working on a cure that is not detailed in the book in order to convince General Abbot to spare their lives. On the train, Jepperd encounters Jimmy, a former teammate of his, who figures out Birdie's location. Aimee realizes they have been found by the Last Men and that the Preserve is no longer safe. Bear discovers that Last Men, whom Jimmy neglected to mention, are aboard the train. Attempting to flee, Jepperd blows his cover while attempting to retrieve Gus's stuffed toy, Dog. Jimmy sacrifices himself to enable the group to jump off the train. The Singhs are taken to a classified location. Aimee, Wendy, and the other Preserve hybrids pack and escape through the tunnels with Aimee remaining behind. Gus, Jepperd, and Bear reach Birdie's last known location in Essex County.
7	7	"When Pubba Met Birdie"	Toa Fraser	Beth Schwartz	June 4, 2021	T13.22307
Gus, Bear, and Jepperd arrive at Birdie's address only to discover that only Birdie's former coworker Judy lives there and that Birdie left ten years ago. Gus later goes through Birdie's files and learns that he was the result of an experiment that Birdie was working on. It is revealed that Pubba's real name was Richard, who worked as a janitor at the same lab where Birdie worked as a geneticist. After formally meeting one night, Birdie received a call saying the military was taking over the lab. With help from Richard, Birdie was able to rescue an infant Gus but gave him to Richard for safekeeping while she went back to destroy her research. Horrified by the truth that he had no parents, Gus angrily runs off into the woods.
8	8	"Big Man"	Jim Mickle	Jim Mickle	June 4, 2021	T13.22308
Gus finds an abandoned plane and uses its radio to contact the Preserve, not knowing the Last Men have taken over. Though Aimee is able to escape, her hybrids are captured at the rendezvous point. Commandeering the Preserve, General Abbot forces Singh to begin working on a cure for the Sick while having Rani placed in a special room. Jepperd finds Gus and sits with him, recounting how he lost his hybrid son. However, the Last Men arrive, shoot Jepperd unconscious, and capture Gus. Aimee rescues Jepperd, vowing that they will get their children back. At the Preserve, Gus meets Wendy and the other hybrids. Back at the house, it is revealed that Bear's real name is Becky Walker and Wendy was her adoptive sister, who was taken from her following their parents deaths from the Sick. She later receives a communication from a phone and answers it as the person on the other line is revealed to be Birdie, hiding somewhere in the Arctic with her research.

=== Season 2 (2023) ===
No. overall	No. in season	Title	Directed by	Written by	Original release date	Prod. code
9	1	"In Captivity"	Jim Mickle	Jim Mickle	April 27, 2023	T13.23451
In the Arctic, Birdie recovers a journal from a shipwreck. At the preserve, Gus and Wendy temporarily escape their cell and attempt to use the radio to contact Aimee, discovering the corpse of Wendy's friend Roy. After lying to the others that Roy escaped, Gus is taken to Dr. Singh's lab where the doctor learns that Gus is older than the virus. Upon learning of Gus's vision of Richard from the purple flowers, the doctor asks for Gus's help, promising not to harm the hybrids. Returning to their cell, Gus discovers Dog amongst their food with Wendy picking up Aimee's scent from it. Knowing that Jepperd had him when they got separated, Gus believes that the two are alive and working together to rescue them. Meanwhile, Becky continues her call with Birdie, finding a cassette tape meant for Gus. The home is then raided by Last Men, forcing Judy to hold them off, enabling Becky to escape.
10	2	"Into the Deep Woods"	Toa Fraser	Carly Woodworth	April 27, 2023	T13.23452
Jepperd and Aimee break into the Preserve to rescue their kids, but are caught. Before escaping, Jepperd leaves Dog in one of the food bags. Brought before Dr. Singh, Gus is placed in a room filled with purple flowers. Exploring his memories, Gus sees signs for Fort Smith Labs and Project Midnight Sun, leading the doctor to believe that the lab created both the Sick and Gus. After escaping the city from pursuing Last Men, Jepperd suggests recruiting some former Last Men he knew. While the hybrids are downhearted by their failed rescue, Gus lifts their spirits by talking about his home in Yellowstone, promising to take them there once they escape. Dr. Singh believes Gus may be key to saving the world.
11	3	"Chicken or Egg?"	Carol Banker	Oanh Ly	April 27, 2023	T13.23453
After learning that Jepperd's allies have died, Aimee suggests contacting her allies the Air Lords. Meanwhile, Dr. Singh takes Gus on a trip to Fort Smith Labs for answers. While there, they are attacked by a crocodile hybrid named Peter, who Gus manages to calm down before being subdued. Entering the Project Midnight Sun Lab with Dr. Singh, Gus learns from a tape that Birdie was the lead scientist in the project. Through injecting microbes found in the Arctic into chickens, it led to the birth of Gus. Leaving the lab with a few supplies and Peter, Gus threatens to stop aiding Dr. Singh if they hurt Peter. After briefly joining a traveling party, Becky decides to join the Last Men in the hopes of finding her friends. Back at the Preserve, Rani sees how intelligent the hybrids are and begins to doubt Abbot's plans for them. Gus is confronted by the hybrids, now aware of Roy's death. Later that night, the Air Lords contact Aimee.
12	4	"Bad Man"	Robyn Grace	Noah Griffith & Daniel Stewart & Zaike LaPorte Airey	April 27, 2023	T13.23454
The Air Lords pick up Aimee and Jepperd in Factory Town. During negotiations for the rescue mission, Jepperd admits to Aimee that he was a hybrid catcher for the Last Men. Angered by this revelation, Aimee has Jepperd kicked off the mission, forcing him to chase after them. At the Preserve, Gus is shunned by the other hybrids for lying about Roy. Dr. Singh manages to create a cure, which Abbot takes as leverage. Over dinner, Abbot informs the Singhs about an upcoming meeting with three other leaders, Dutch, Voss, and Helen Zhang, collectively known as the Three. Dr. Singh's preoccupation with finding a cure worries Rani. After excelling through training, Becky is assigned a mission to become an official Last Man. Learning of Peter's death from the guards, Gus tries to escape but runs into Abbot.
13	5	"What It Takes"	Ciaran Foy	Bo Yeon Kim & Erika Lippoldt	April 27, 2023	T13.23455
After having one of his antlers cut off by Abbot as a show of power, Gus is comforted by Wendy and the others as they make an escape plan. After learning that the cure doesn't work, Rani tries to convince her husband to tell the truth, enabling their escape. Becky learns that the hybrid location was a trap set by Tiger, who she captures. At the meeting with the Three, Abbot presents them with his proposal: a community called Evergreen. In exchange for their resources, he offers them and their best men a place and the cure. To Rani's dismay, Singh refuses to admit that the cure doesn't work. The hybrids manage to escape. While distracting the guards, Gus reunites with Jepperd, who was captured while negotiating his release. After Zhang has Dutch and Voss killed to claim all the spots for herself, Abbot receives a warning from the Air Lords.
14	6	"How It Started, How It's Going"	Toa Fraser	Noah Griffith & Daniel Stewart	April 27, 2023	T13.23456
The Air Lords drop canisters of purple flowers onto the Preserve, causing panic. During the attack, Becky sorts things out with Tiger, who agrees to offer the army's full support in rescuing Gus and Wendy. Gus sets Jepperd free and the two reunite with the other hybrids, leading them to a bus. Aimee sneaks into the Preserve and destroys Dr. Singh's lab in retaliation for killing Roy. Reuniting with Wendy, the two meet up with the others at the bus. While attempting to escape, Singh returns to his lab in the belief that Gus may hold the key to a cure despite Rani's efforts to convince him to let go of finding one. Upon seeing it ablaze, he heads back only to find that Rani had abandoned him. Abbot realizes too late that the purple flowers were fake. As the gang is driving to Yellowstone, Aimee begins showing symptoms that she has the Sick.
15	7	"I'll Find You"	Robyn Grace	Oanh Ly & Carly Woodworth	April 27, 2023	T13.23457
Gus and Jepperd reunite with Becky who gives Birdie's tape to Gus. She also meets Wendy but keeps quiet about their relation. The Animal Army promises to stop Abbot. During a pit stop, Jepperd learns that Aimee has the Sick. Though she has a treatment, she refuses to take it given it was made from Roy. At Yellowstone, Becky looks after the hybrids while Jepperd finds a cassette player for Gus. The tape reveals that after Birdie left Gus with Richard, she was captured and brought before her boss Gillian Washington, who is revealed to be patient zero of the Sick. She believes Gus may be the cure and demands that Birdie find him. Birdie however, escapes to Alaska, to continue her research and to keep Gus safe. Abbot discovers the locations of the hybrids before eradicating the entire Animal Army at the cost of some of the Last Men. That night, a dying Tiger arrives at Yellowstone to warn everyone that Abbot is coming.
16	8	"The Ballad of the Last Men"	Carol Banker	Jim Mickle & Bo Yeon Kim & Erika Lippoldt	April 27, 2023	T13.23458
With the Last Men on their way, Gus, Jepperd, and Aimee set traps to prepare for war while Becky takes the others to safety. Wendy learns that she is Becky's sister after the latter rescues her. The Last Men fall for the traps though Aimee is soon confronted by Abbot whom she injects with a syringe containing the virus. Gus tries to escape with the treatment, but Abbot eventually pins him down. Gus's cries unexpectedly summon a stampede of bison who trample Abbot to death. Following the battle, Aimee dies from the Sick and is memorialized by everyone. After having a dream of Birdie in trouble in Alaska, Gus, Jepperd, Becky, and Wendy decide to head out there. Having had a similar vision, Dr. Singh also heads there. Enraged by the news of the Last Men's eradication, Zhang vows to take care of things before feeding feral creatures locked in cages.

=== Season 3 (2024) ===
No. overall	No. in season	Title	Directed by	Written by	Original release date	Prod. code
17	1	"The Beginning Is also the End"	Toa Fraser	Noah Griffith & Daniel Stewart	June 6, 2024	T13.23801
In the past, Dr. James Thacker is confronted by his sick crew over what he found in a cave in Alaska. In the present, Gus and his friends continue their journey to Alaska before stopping at an abandoned casino in search of supplies. Though the people who live there refuse to let them part with their possessions, one of them tells them the location of a ship heading to Canada. In Alaska, Birdie is confronted by one of Zhang's men, leading to a chase after which she is rescued by a mysterious entity. Back with Gus and co., the group is settling in for the night at a motel when they are confronted by Dr. Singh. Meanwhile, a group of feral wolf hybrids begin tracking down Gus.
18	2	"Thank God I'm a Country Boy"	Toa Fraser	Zaike LaPorte Airey	June 6, 2024	T13.23802
Though distrustful of Singh, Gus agrees to let him join them after learning about his visions of a cave in Alaska. Needing a ride, the group head to a house with a plane whose owner agrees to help them if they help his wife give birth. During this, Gus and Wendy meet the man's son Theo who they discover is a hybrid though his father is trying to suppress this. When Theo's brother is born a hybrid, his father tries to cut off his appendages but is stopped by the group. Having discovered wanted posters of Gus in a secret room, the group is forced to flee when the father rats them out to Zhang but not before Theo provides them with their van. Meanwhile in Alaska, Birdie wakes up in a church where she meets her rescuer: an elderly caribou man who asks her about Gus from his baby picture.
19	3	"The Pack"	Robyn Grace	Carly Woodworth	June 6, 2024	T13.23803
In a flashback amidst the collapse of society, Zhang agreed to let her estranged daughter Rosie come home if she let her raise her wolf hybrid sons. In the present, Gus and co. arrive at the reef where the ship is only to learn that it had left. Discovering a boat, the gang proceeds to fix it up in hopes of sailing out to the ship. Though Jepperd attempts to get rid of Singh since the boat isn't big enough for all of them, the latter asserts himself by revealing that only he and Gus were in his vision. Eventually, Rosie tracks down the group, forcing Becky and Wendy to stay behind to allow Gus, Jepperd, and Singh's escape. Becky is soon captured by Rosie while Wendy escapes. As night falls, Gus, Jepperd, and Singh find the ship in the middle of the ocean.
20	4	"Beyond the Sea"	Robyn Grace	Kseniya Melnik and Noah Griffith & Daniel Stewart	June 6, 2024	T13.23804
Gus, Jepperd, and Singh board the ship only to discover that everyone had died from the Sick. Being immune, Gus volunteers to restart the engines while Jepperd and Singh wait in the boiler room. After learning that the ship was shut off to prevent the Sick from reaching the mainland, Gus decides to get rid of the Sick by tossing the corpses and flowers into the sea, giving eulogies to the passengers who died. After finishing up, Gus retrieves Jepperd and Singh and a course is set to Alaska. Back on the mainland, Zhang explains to Becky her plans to use Gus to restart human birth before tricking Becky into confessing Gus's location. As Zhang's forces ship out to Alaska, Wendy sneaks aboard the plane.
21	5	"The Tail-Tale Heart"	Ciaran Foy	Oanh Ly & Daniel G. King	June 6, 2024	T13.23805
Arriving in Alaska, Gus's group is met by Birdie's friend Siana and her hybrid daughter Nuka who take them to their outpost unaware that Zhang's group have arrived before them. At the outpost, Gus hears a heartbeat, the direction of which follows along a caribou migration trail. Zhang's group storm into the outpost demanding Gus's location. Jepperd tries to distract them to enable Gus's escape, but Singh, having become convinced from Thacker's journal that he has to sacrifice Gus to cure the Sick, betrays his location to Zhang. Siana causes a distraction, enabling her and Jepperd to escape. Wendy rescues Becky and the two escape Zhang's base. After following a pipeline along the trail to a dead end, Gus is confronted by the wolf boys only to be saved by the caribou man.
22	6	"Here, There Be Monsters"	Ciaran Foy	Bo Yeon Kim & Erika Lippoldt	June 6, 2024	T13.23806
Guiding the injured caribou man back to his home, Gus finally reunites with Birdie much to their mutual delight. The caribou man, Munaq, reveals to Gus that when Thacker came to Alaska, he did something in a remote cave that led to the Sick and his birth. Having seen the worst of humanity throughout his life, Munaq tells Gus that the Sick is the cure for the true disease: humanity itself before dying from his injuries. At Birdie's research station, Becky and Wendy reunite with Jepperd, who rallies the outpost into stopping Zhang's forces from powering up the Beast: a drilling machine which Zhang would use to take what was in the cave. Gus figures out the location of the cave and he and Birdie prepare to leave before someone starts pounding on the door.
23	7	"The Road Ends Here"	Jim Mickle	Noah Griffith & Daniel Stewart	June 6, 2024	T13.23807
Jepperd arrives to Gus and Birdie before the three head out to find the cave. Becky, Wendy, and the outpost sneak back into their base to prevent Zhang's forces from trying to charge the Beast. Despite their efforts, the machine is charged and ships out to the cave. Arriving at the cave, Gus, Jepperd, and Birdie brave its obstacles and reach the central chamber where they discover an antler-like tree with frozen red sap gushing out. Afraid of the consequences of what would happen if they collected the sap, Birdie and Jepperd reason with Gus that it was best to let nature run its course. Zhang and her forces arrive and pin the group down. As Singh prepares to kill Gus, Birdie takes the blow and dies in Gus' arms.
24	8	"This Is a Story"	Jim Mickle	Jim Mickle	June 6, 2024	T13.23808
Disillusioned by Birdie's death, Gus declares to Zhang's forces that they don't deserve to live. Regardless, Zhang orders Singh to kill Gus again, but when the former invokes Rani's name, he turns against her and orders Gus to run. Meanwhile, Becky purposefully drives the Beast to crash, barely surviving. Refusing to admit defeat, Zhang attempts to kill Gus with an axe embedded in the tree only for the sap to gush out, causing all humans to catch the Sick. After having a final conversation with Richard due to the tree, Gus sets it on fire, healing everyone. The cave however, begins to collapse and Singh sacrifices himself to save Gus who escapes along with Jepperd, Zhang, and some of her men, who disillusioned by her actions, abandon her. Gus and his friends return to Yellowstone where they build a sanctuary for the hybrids. Years later, an elderly Gus recounts his tales to his grandchildren and their friends.

== Production ==
=== Development ===
On November 16, 2018, it was announced that streaming service Hulu had given a pilot order to a potential television series adaptation of the comic book series. The pilot was expected to be written and directed by Jim Mickle, who was also set to executive produce alongside Robert Downey Jr., Susan Downey, Amanda Burrell and Linda Moran. Production companies involved with the pilot were slated to consist of Team Downey and Warner Bros. Television. On April 9, 2020, it was announced that the series had been moved from Hulu to Netflix. On May 12, 2020, Netflix had given the production a series order that consists of eight episodes with Evan Moore attached to the series as a producer and Beth Schwartz served as a writer, an executive producer, and co-showrun alongside Mickle. On July 29, 2021, Netflix renewed the series for an 8-episode second season.

Lemire has acknowledged that the series has a lighter tone than the comic book series, stating that he and Mickle wanted the series to bring a new perspective to the post-apocalyptic genre after what they believed to be an oversaturation of dark dystopian fiction released since the original comic was published. On May 3, 2023, Netflix renewed the series for a third and final season.

=== Casting ===
On May 12, 2020, Christian Convery, Nonso Anozie, Adeel Akhtar, and Will Forte were cast in starring roles with James Brolin set to narrate the series. On July 30, 2020, Dania Ramirez joined the main cast. On August 19, 2020, Neil Sandilands was cast in an undisclosed capacity. On September 30, 2020, Stefania LaVie Owen joined the cast in a starring role. On November 2, 2020, Aliza Vellani was promoted to series regular ahead of the series premiere.

In March 2023, Naledi Murray, Neil Sandilands and Marlon Williams were promoted to series regulars while Christopher Cooper Sean Jr. and Yonas Kibreab joined the cast as series regulars for the second season. In May 2023, it was reported that Rosalind Chao and Amy Seimetz had been promoted to series regulars while Cara Gee and Ayazhan Dalabayeva were cast as series regulars for the third season. In April 2024, it was announced that Kelly Marie Tran joined the third season a new series regular.

=== Filming ===
In July 2020, New Zealand granted the series permission to film, despite the recent travel restrictions due to the COVID-19 pandemic. On September 30, 2020, it was reported that the series had resumed filming after the COVID-19 pandemic halted production months earlier, with filming concluding around mid-December 2020. Filming for the second season ended in early June 2022. In May 2023, it was reported that the third and final season had already been filmed in New Zealand.

== Release ==
The first season of Sweet Tooth was released on June 4, 2021. The eight-episode second season premiered on April 27, 2023. The third season was released on June 6, 2024.

== Reception ==
=== Audience viewership ===
On July 20, 2021, Netflix revealed that the series has been watched by 60 million households since its June 4 release.

=== Critical response ===
For the first season, the review aggregator website Rotten Tomatoes reported an approval rating of 97% based on 74 critic reviews, with an average rating of 8/10. The website's critics consensus reads, "Emotionally engaging, superbly acted, and incredibly entertaining, Sweet Tooth will satisfy fantasy fans of all ages." Metacritic gave the first season a weighted average score of 78 out of 100 based on 19 critic reviews, indicating "generally favorable reviews".

Reviewing the series for Rolling Stone, Alan Sepinwall gave a rating of 3.5/5 and said, "Whether Gus and friends are having scary adventures or fun ones, those parts of Sweet Tooth are full of life, and as exciting or tense as needed. The show can be hit or miss, though, when it moves away from Gus." In her review of the series, Lucy Mangan of The Guardian gave the series 3 out of 5 stars, saying "Sweet Tooth is part fantasy, part sci-fi, part whimsy, part cold-eyed realism and most points in between. It is either warmly eccentric or hysterically crazy, perfect entertainment or a horrifying attempt to parlay the pandemic into a commercially palatable mashup. It is undoubtedly aimed at a younger-than-full-adult audience." Daniel D'Addario of Variety also gave the series a positive review, writing "Throughout, the show is made with a surprising degree of curiosity about what changes in society would look like across varying sorts of communities, and with a capacious imagination to boot. And while it envisions a world transformed by illness and pain, "Sweet Tooth" feels fundamentally light of touch and, well, sweet of intention. Its pandemic-riven world has been torn apart, to be sure, and in the wake comes dissension — but kindness and connection, too. Change provides the opportunity for grand-scale reimagining of what life can look like or be, as well as small opportunities to come into one's own — to find one's humanity, even when wearing deer antlers."

Brian Tallerico of RogerEbert.com wrote in his review that "Netflix's brilliant "Sweet Tooth" may not be a direct commentary on what the world has been through in the last year, but the presence of that real-world echo is undeniable. It's a show about a devastating virus that leads people to distrust one another, go into hiding, allow their fear to drive their decisions, and ultimately form unexpected bonds. It's about isolation and grief, but it is also very much about the unpredictable connections that can end up defining us. It's intense, riveting storytelling that recalls the spirit of Amblin almost more than the nostalgia warehouse that is "Stranger Things," the king of Netflix Originals. It would have been excellent television in any year, but "Sweet Tooth" strikes a different chord in 2021 than anyone could have expected." Ben Travers of Indiewire gave the series a B− and wrote "The series' efficient storytelling, world-building, and character work make it easy to switch off your brain and enjoy the adventure (that is, if you can get past The Sick). Strong performances help, too, and with so many critical core ingredients working smoothly, it's much easier for a genial little fantasy-adventure series to go down easy. "Sweet Tooth" may not offer a full meal, but sometimes all you need is a good piece of chocolate." Samantha Nelson of Polygon praised the series and wrote "The COVID-19 pandemic devastated some communities, while others seemed to entirely deny its existence. Sweet Tooth combines an examination of that inequality with the morals of other excellent post-apocalyptic stories, like 28 Days Later and Mad Max: Fury Road, which argue that survival is not enough to keep people functioning. The villains in Sweet Tooth are the ones who cling to a world that no longer exists, while the heroes try to build something better with the help of their found family. Sweet Tooth's subject matter might seem too bleak for the current era, but its timeliness also empowers the show's message of hope and shared strength."

The second season has an 86% approval rating on Rotten Tomatoes, based on 22 critic reviews, with an average rating of 7.2/10. The website's critics consensus states, "More mature but still suitable for younger viewers, Sweet Tooth's sophomore season makes post-apocalyptic survival fun for the whole family." On Metacritic, the second season received a score of 76 based on 7 critics, indicating "generally favorable reviews".

The third season holds a 93% approval rating on Rotten Tomatoes, based on 14 critic reviews, with an average rating of 7.6/10. The website's critics consensus reads, "Closing out before it grows too long in the tooth, this richly imagined family series remains engrossing to the very end." Metacritic gave the third season a weighted average score of 74 out of 100 based on 5 critic reviews, indicating "generally favorable reviews".

=== Accolades ===
This series was nominated for the 2021 Harvey Awards for the Best Adaptation from Comic Book/Graphic Novel.

Year	Award	Category	Nominee(s)	Result	Ref.
2022	Visual Effects Society Awards	Outstanding Supporting Visual Effects in a Photoreal Episode	Rob Price, Danica Tsang, Matt Bramante, Jayme Vandusen (for "Sorry About All the Dead People")	Nominated	
2022	1st Children's and Family Emmy Awards	Outstanding Supporting Performance	Adeel Akhtar as Aditya Singh	Nominated	
2022	1st Children's and Family Emmy Awards	Outstanding Supporting Performance	Nonso Anozie as Tommy Jepperd	Won	
2022	1st Children's and Family Emmy Awards	Outstanding Casting for a Live-Action Program	Carmen Cuba, Stu Turner	Nominated	
2022	1st Children's and Family Emmy Awards	Outstanding Directing for a Single Camera Program	Toa Fraser, Robyn Grace, Jim Mickle, Alexis Ostrander	Nominated	
2022	1st Children's and Family Emmy Awards	Outstanding Editing for a Single Camera Program	Michael Berenbaum, Shawn Paper	Nominated	
2022	1st Children's and Family Emmy Awards	Outstanding Sound Mixing and Sound Editing for a Live Action Program	George Haddad, Chad J. Hughes, Alexander Pugh, Alex Gruzdev, Sean Hessinger, Julie Altus, Mark Messenger, Mark Williams, Brad Sherman, John Sanacore, Catherine Harper, Rick Owens, Scott Francisco	Won	
2022	1st Children's and Family Emmy Awards	Outstanding Visual Effects for a Live Action Program	Matt Bramante, Rob Price	Nominated	
2022	1st Children's and Family Emmy Awards	Outstanding Special Effects Costumes, Hair and Makeup	Justin Raleigh	Nominated	
2022	1st Children's and Family Emmy Awards	Outstanding Writing for a Young Teen Program	Justin Boyd, Noah Griffith, Christina Ham, Haley Harris, Jim Mickle, Michael R. Perry, Beth Schwartz, Daniel Stewart	Nominated	
2023	2nd Children's and Family Emmy Awards	Outstanding Supporting Performance	Adeel Akhtar as Aditya Singh	Won	
2023	2nd Children's and Family Emmy Awards	Outstanding Supporting Performance	Nonso Anozie as Tommy Jepperd	Nominated	
2023	2nd Children's and Family Emmy Awards	Outstanding Supporting Performance	Neil Sandilands as General Abbot	Nominated	
2023	2nd Children's and Family Emmy Awards	Outstanding Art Direction/Set Decoration/Scenic Design	Nick Bassett, Nick Connor, George Hamilton, Gareth Edwards	Nominated	
2023	2nd Children's and Family Emmy Awards	Outstanding Stunt Coordination for a Live Action Program	Steve McQuillan	Nominated	
2023	2nd Children's and Family Emmy Awards	Outstanding Cinematography for a Live Action Single-Camera Program	John Cavill, Dave Garbett, Rob Marsh	Won	
2023	2nd Children's and Family Emmy Awards	Outstanding Lighting, Camera and Technical Arts	Giles Coburn, Sam Jellie	Nominated	
2023	2nd Children's and Family Emmy Awards	Outstanding Costume Design/Styling	Amanda Neale, Lucy McLay, Simone Knight	Nominated	
2023	2nd Children's and Family Emmy Awards	Outstanding Makeup and Hairstyling	Stef Knight, Jane O'Kane, Jacqui Leung, Aly Webby, Justin Raleigh, Vanya Pell, Shay Lawrence, Julian Ledger, Carley Cooper	Nominated	
2023	2nd Children's and Family Emmy Awards	Outstanding Editing for a Single Camera Program	Michael Berenbaum, David Bilow, John Dietrick	Nominated	
2023	2nd Children's and Family Emmy Awards	Outstanding Visual Effects for a Live Action Program	Rob Price, Danica Tsang, Matthew Bramante, John Fukushima, Dallis Anderson, Tara Khan, David Eschrich, Brad McGiveron, John Lipskie, Patricia Binga, Anouchka Farrenc, Graeme Baitz, Frank Riley, Jayson A. Castro, Nolan Conrad	Nominated	
2024	76th Writers Guild of America Awards	Children's Episodic, Long Form and Specials	Jim Mickle, Bo Yeon Kim, Erika Lippoldt (for "The Ballad of the Last Men")	Nominated	
