= Sean Andrew Faden =

Sean Andrew Faden (born July 23, 1973) is a computer graphics animator. In 2003 he was nominated for a Saturn Award for Best Special Effects for his work on the film xXx, and in 2008, he was nominated for a Visual Effects Society Award in the category of Outstanding Animated Character in a Live Action Broadcast Program or Commercial (shared with Matthew Hackett, Jeff Willette, and actor Denis Gauthier). In 2021, he was nominated for an Academy Award on VFX work in Mulan.

His numerous film and television credits for visual effects and computer animation includes:

- Murderbot (2025)
- Moon Knight (2022)
- Mulan (2020)
- Captain America: The First Avenger (2011)
- A Little Bit of Heaven (2011)
- Gulliver's Travels (2011)
- Let Me In (2010)
- A Nightmare on Elm Street (2010)
- Percy Jackson & the Olympians: The Lightning Thief (2010)
- Terminator Salvation (2009)
- The Curious Case of Benjamin Button (2008)
- The Eye (2008)
- Apocalypto (2006)
- Deja Vu (2006)
- Pirates of the Caribbean: Dead Man's Chest (2006)
- Domino (2005)
- Sky High (2005)
- Charlie and the Chocolate Factory (2005)
- The Amityville Horror (2005)
- The Phantom of the Opera (2004)
- National Treasure (2004)
- The Day After Tomorrow (2004)
- xXx (2002)
- The Time Machine (2002)
- Stormrider (2001)
- How the Grinch Stole Christmas (2000)
- Red Planet (2000)
- Supernova (2000)
- Fight Club (1999)
- Godzilla (1998)
- Titanic (1997)
