= Children's and Family Emmy Award for Outstanding Short Form Program =

Award for Outstanding Short Form Program

- Awarded for: Outstanding Short Form Program
- Country: United States
- Presented by: Academy of Television Arts & Sciences
- First award: 2022
- Currently held by: Daffy in Wackyland (animated) Andrew Garfield and Elmo Explain Grief (live action) (2025)
- Website: theemmys.tv/childrens/

This is the list of winners of the Children's and Family Emmy Award for Outstanding Short Form Program, which honors live action series, animated series, and TV specials aimed at viewers from infancy to age 15 that average a runtime of less than or equal to eight minutes. The category was established at the 1st Children's and Family Emmy Awards in 2022, and was split into two awards honoring live action and animated programs at the 3rd Children's and Family Emmy Awards in 2024.

The inaugural winner of the award was We the People. The most recent recipients are Daffy in Wackyland and Andrew Garfield and Elmo Explain Grief.

== Background ==
On November 17, 2021, the NATAS announced the creation of the Children's and Family Emmy Awards to recognize the best in children's and family television. The organization cited an "explosive growth in the quantity and quality of children's and family programming" as justification for a dedicated ceremony. Many categories of the awards were previously presented at the Daytime Emmy Awards.

For the 3rd Children's and Family Emmy Awards, the maximum runtime for episodes was lowered from nine to eight minutes, and the category was split into Outstanding Live Action Short Form Program and Outstanding Animated Short Form Program.

== Winners and nominations ==
=== 2020s ===
Year	Series	Producers	Network	Ref
2022 (1st)
2022 (1st)	We the People	Kenya Barris, Antonio Canobbio, Nick Carmen, Tonia Davis, Ben Kalina, Joe Nash, Chris Nee, Barack Obama, Michelle Obama, Chris Prynoski, Shannon Prynoski, Emily Ricard, Priya Swaminathan (executive producers); Justin Harris, Billy Mack (senior producers); Ada Chiaghana, Will Feng, Jess Pierik, Erynn Sampson, Peedee Shindell (producers); Tim Rauch (supervising director); Benjy Brook, Everett Downing, Trisha Gum, Daron Nefcy, Jorge R. Gutierrez, Peter Ramsey, Kendra Ryan, Victoria Vincent, Mabel Ye (directors); Kristen Anderson-Lopez, Andra Day, H.E.R., Denzel Michael-Akil Baptiste, Brandi Carlile, Ronald Colson, Cordae Dunston, Oak Felder, Jeff Gitelman, Amanda Gorman, Kay Hanley, David Harris, Kyle Harvey, Nathaniel Irvin, III, Scott Krippayne, Michelle Lewis, Robert Lopez, David Charles Marshall Biral, Lin-Manuel Miranda, Maxx Moore, Janelle Monáe Robinson, Daniel Petty, Michael "Smidi" Smith, Tim van Berkestijn (writers)	Netflix	
2022 (1st)	Ciao Alberto	Enrico Casarosa, Kiri Hart (executive producers); Matt DiMartini (producer); Kenna Harris (writer/director)	Disney+	
2022 (1st)	Little Bird	Chris Perry (producer); Raf Anzovin, Jill Daniels (associate producers)	Vimeo	
2022 (1st)	Rhymes Through Times	Lasette Canady, Marc Cantone, Julius Harper, Christopher Jackson (executive producers); Carl Reed, David Steward II (co-executive producers); Caroline Manalo (senior producer); Taryn Koslow (line producer); Saxton Moore (director)	Noggin	
2022 (1st)	Sesame Street in Communities: Explaining Race	Melissa Dino (executive producer); Ashmou Younge (producer); Alan Muraoka (director); Laura Canty-Samuel (writer)	YouTube	
2023 (2nd)
2023 (2nd)	I Am Groot	Victoria Alonso, Louis D'Esposito, Kevin Feige, James Gunn, Kirsten Lepore, Brad Winderbaum (executive producers); Dana Vasquez-Eberhardt (supervising producer); Carrie Wassenaar (producer)	Disney+	
2023 (2nd)	Molly of Denali: The Big Gathering	Trevor Bentley, Dorothea Gillim (executive producers); Heather Renney (supervising producer); Anthony Bostler (co-ordinating producer); Elizabeth Thorsen (producer); Yatibaey Evans (creative producer); Courtenay Desirée Crane (line producer); Amanda Strong (director); Peter K. Hirsch, Vera Starbard (head writers); Frank Henry, Kaash Katasse (story by); Anna Hoover, Princess Daazhraii Johnson, June Thiele (writers)	PBS Kids	
2023 (2nd)	Sesame Street: Wes' First Barbershop Haircut	Melissa Dino, Sal Perez, Kay Wilson Stallings (executive producers); Ashmou Younge (producer); Fiorela Gonzales (associate producer); Noel MacNeal (director); Frank Campagna (co-director); Keion Jackson (writer)	YouTube	
2023 (2nd)	Sesame Street's #ComingTogether Word of the Day Series	Karyn Leibovich, Andrew Moriarty, Sal Perez (producers); Aimee Blackton, Amanda Young (line producers); Shannon Flynn, Todd E. James, Linda Mendoza, Liliana Olszewski, Brittany Scott Smith (directors); Amy Banks, Laura Canty-Samuel, Isabella Hattem, Maxwell Nicoll, Joy Regullano (writers)	YouTube	
2023 (2nd)	Storyline Online	Trish Keller, Rochelle Rose, Cyd Wilson (executive producers); Caroline O'Connor (producer); Amy Adrion, Aimee Nowland (directors)	YouTube	
2024 (3rd)	Animated			
2024 (3rd)	Once Upon a Studio	Jennifer Lee (executive producer); Yvett Merino, Bradford Simonsen (producers); Dan Abraham, Trent Correy (directors/writers)	Disney+	
2024 (3rd)	How Not to Draw	Gino Guzzardo (executive producer); Jenna Hicks (producer); Arsine Avedissian (associate producer); Kevin Leal (written and storyboarded by); Dan Siegel (story editor); Ben Siemon (staff writer); Steve Hirt (director)	Disney Channel	
2024 (3rd)	I Am Groot	Victoria Alonso, Louis D'Esposito, Kevin Feige, Brad Winderbaum (executive producers); Dana Vasquez-Eberhardt (co-executive producer); Danielle Costa (supervising producer); Craig Rittenbaum, Alex Scharf (producers); Kirsten Lepore (executive producer/director/writer)	Disney+	
2024 (3rd)	Take Care with Peanuts	Stephanie Betts, Paige Braddock, Mark Evestaff, Anne Loi, Josh Scherba, Craig Schulz (executive producers); Mary Karaplis, Kimberly Small (producers);	Snoopy - Official Channel	
2024 (3rd)	The Wonderful World of Mickey Mouse: Steamboat Silly	Philip M. Cohen (producer); Paul Rudish (executive producer/supervising producer/writer); Eddie Trigueros (director/writer); Darrick Bachman, Kristen Morrison (writers); Jessica Forer (associate producers)	Disney+	
2024 (3rd)	Live Action			
2024 (3rd)	Sesame Street: Elmo and Jesse Remember Uncle Jack	Melissa Dino, Sal Perez, Kay Wilson Stallings (executive producers); Ashmou Etossi Younge (producer); Amanda Young (line producer); Fiorela Gonzales (associate producer); Frank Campagna (director); Ayub Arain (writer)	Sesame Workshop	
2024 (3rd)	GIRLS' VOICES NOW: The Beauty in Being Different: Girls' Voices Now	Stephen P. Jarchow, John Mongiardo, Malachy Wienges (executive producers); Heidi Basch-Harod, Paul Colichman, David Millbern (producers); Rebekah Grace de Guzman, Jairemei De Padua, Madison McMorrin Watson, Jennifer Tecum (writer/directors)	Here TV	
2024 (3rd)	Healthy Minds Thriving Kids	Dave Anderson, Harold Koplewicz, Ari Kuschnir, Brian Latt, Kate Oppenheim, Arelys Perez (executive producers); Jeremy Chapman (co-executive producer); Harry Goldman (supervising producer); Gabriella Bobadilla, Janine Domingues, Caroline Mendel (series producers); Tom Martin (line producer); Raquel Marvez (director); Bianca Giaever (writer/director); Ben Orbison (writer)	Child Mind Institute	
2024 (3rd)	Kid Gloves	Kevin Polowy, Luna Polowy, Lyla Polowy (producers)	Kid Gloves Show	
2025 (4th)
2025 (4th)	Animated			
2025 (4th)	Daffy in Wackyland	Pete Browngardt, Sam Register (executive producers); Alex Kirwan (supervising producer); Rebecca Palatnik (producer); Max Winston (writer/director)	HBO/HBO Max	
2025 (4th)	Acoustic Rooster: Jazzy Jams	Kwame Alexander (creator/executive producer); Chris Brodie, Julius Harper, Tina Ouellette, Angel Tyree (executive producers); Nicole Velez (senior producer); Madeleine Shelley (associate producer); Ranjit Gill, Rachel Stolberg (directors); Bruce Alcock (creative director); Kay Donmyer (creator/writer)	PBS Kids	
2025 (4th)	Count on June Bug	Alex Herder, Jill Peters, Sandra Sheppard (executive producers); Michelle Chen (senior producer); Katrina Deptula (producer); Jesse Pilnik (associate producer); Eri Hashimoto, Katie Trayte (directors); Michael Capbarat, Kevin Del Aguila, Katrina Deptula (writers)	Thirteen	
2025 (4th)	Eva the Owlet	Caitlin Friedman, Cathal Gaffney, Jef Kaminsky, Iole Lucchese, Darragh O'Connell (executive producers); Rebecca Elliott (co-executive producer); Gillian Higgins, Lorraine Morgan (supervising producers); Mason Rather (line producer); Geraldine Weber (series producer) Annabeth Bondor-Stone, Connor White (co-executive producers/writers); Eric Black, Madison Pierce (co-producers); Damien O'Connor (counsulting producer/director); Mark Rusk (episodic director); Jessica Welsh (writer)	Apple TV+	
2025 (4th)	How Not to Draw	Gino Guzzardo (executive producer); Jenna Hicks (producer); Steve Hirt (director); Madison Bateman, Kevin DelVecchio, Ben Siemon (writers); Arsine Avedissian (associate producer); Dan Siegel (story editor)	Disney+	
2025 (4th)	Road Trip	Gino Guzzardo (executive producer); Jenna Hicks (producer); Steve Hirt (director); Ben Siemon (writer); Arsine Avedissian (associate producer); Dan Siegel (story editor)	Disney+	
2025 (4th)	Live Action			
2025 (4th)	Andrew Garfield and Elmo Explain Grief	Sal Perez, Kay Wilson Stallings (executive producers); Courtney Hindle, Karyn Leibovich, Bryce-Loren Walker (producers); Amanda Young (line producer); Andrew Moriarty (producer/writer/director)	Sesame Workshop	
2025 (4th)	Girls' Voices Now	Stephen P. Jarchow, John Mongiardo, Malachy G. Wienges (executive producers); Scott Dearborn, Erin Pedersen (coordinating producers); Heidi Basch-Harod, Paul Colichman, David Millbern (producers); Adira Blades, Erin Dela Cruz, Angelica Guillen (directors)	Here TV	
2025 (4th)	My Way	Ellen Doherty, Sonia Manzano (executive producers); Olubunmi Mia Olufemi (supervising producer); Melanie Robbins (coordinating producer); Erika Knox (producer); William Charles Moss (director); Hugo Perez (director/writer)	PBS Kids	
2025 (4th)	Together We Can	Nathan Chang, Sal Perez, Shelby Smith, Kay Wilson Stallings (executive producers); Mindy Fila (co-executive producer); Christina Bacigalupo, Karyn Leibovich, Stephanie Longardo (senior producers); Riley MacIsaac, Bryce-Loren Walker, Ted Willis (producers); Amanda Young (line producer); William D'Amico, Derek Johnson (post producers)	PBS Kids	

== Shows with multiple nominations ==
- Sesame Street - 6 (2 wins)
- How Not to Draw - 2 (no wins)
- I Am Groot - 2 (one win)

== Networks with multiple wins and nominations ==
=== Multiple wins ===
- Disney+ - 2

=== Multiple nominations ===
- Disney+ - 7
- YouTube - 4
- PBS Kids - 6
- Here TV - 2
- Sesame Workshop - 2
