= City of Ghosts =

City of Ghosts may refer to:

- City of Ghosts (2002 film), an American crime thriller film
- City of Ghosts (2017 film), an Arabic-language American documentary film
- City of Ghosts (TV series), a 2021 French-American television series
