= Children's and Family Emmy Award for Outstanding Fiction Special =

- Awarded for: Outstanding Fiction Special
- Country: United States
- Presented by: Academy of Television Arts & Sciences
- First award: 2022
- Currently held by: Descendants: The Rise of Red (2025)
- Website: theemmys.tv/childrens/

This is a list of winners and nominees of the Children's and Family Emmy Award for Outstanding Fiction Special which honors animated programs both in broadcast and streaming television aimed at young viewers from age six to fifteen. The category was established at the 1st Children's and Family Emmy Awards in 2022.

== Background ==
On November 17, 2021, the NATAS announced the creation of the Children's and Family Emmy Awards to recognize the best in children's and family television. The organization cited an "explosive growth in the quantity and quality of children’s and family programming" as justification for a dedicated ceremony. Many categories of the awards were previously presented at the Daytime Emmy Awards. Programming aimed towards children and young adults was honored from 1974 to 2021 with the Daytime Emmy Award for Outstanding Children's Series, which was presented under various names across its lifespan, and the Primetime Emmy Award for Outstanding Children's Program, which was presented from 1950 to 2020. Following the establishment of the Children's and Family Emmy Awards, both categories were discontinued.

== Winners and nominations ==
=== 2020s ===
Year	Series	Producers	Network	Ref
2022 (1st)
2022 (1st)	Sneakerella	Jane Startz and Rachel Watanabe-Batton, executive producers; Elizabeth Allen Rosenbaum and Tamara Chestna, co-executive producers; D.J. Carson, producer	Disney+	
2022 (1st)	Better Nate Than Ever	Tim Federle and Pamela Thur, executive producers; Marc Platt and Adam Siegel, producers	Disney+	
2022 (1st)	Muppets Haunted Mansion	Bill Barretta, David Lightbody, Leigh Slaughter and Andrew Williams, executive producers; Jim Lewis and Kelly Younger, co-executive producers; Chelsea DeVincent and Michael Steinbach, producers	Disney+	
2022 (1st)	See Us Coming Together: A Sesame Street Special	Benjamin Lehmann, Ken Scarborough and Kay Wilson Stallings, executive producers; Sal Perez, supervising producer; Karyn Leibovich and Stephanie Longardo, senior producer; William D'Amico, Liz Hara, Janet S. Kim, Kathleen Kim, Andrew Moriarty, Alan Muraoka, Matt Vogel and Autumn Zitani, producers; Bryce-Loren Walker, associate producer; Amanda Young, line producer	HBO Max	
2022 (1st)	Spin	Zanne Devine and Manjari Makijany, executive producers	Disney Channel	
2022 (1st)	Waffles + Mochi's Holiday Feast	Tonia Davis, Jeremy Konner, Barack Obama, Michelle Obama, Priya Swaminathan and Erika Thormahlen, executive producers; Alex Braverman, co-executive producer; Maura Anderson and Anna Marie Pitman, producers	Netflix	
2023 (2nd)
2023 (2nd)	The Guardians of the Galaxy Holiday Special	Victoria Alonso, Louis D'Esposito, Kevin Feige, James Gunn, Simon Hatt, Sara Smith and Brad Winderbaum, executive producers; Nikolas Korda, producer	Disney+	
2023 (2nd)	Chang Can Dunk	Liz Niles and Pamela Thur, executive producers; Rishi Rajani, Lena Waithe and Brad Weston, producers	Disney+	
2023 (2nd)	Fraggle Rock: Back to the Rock - Night of the Lights	Alex Cuthbertson, Matt Fusfeld, Lisa Henson, Arnon Milchan, Yariv Milchan, Halle Stanford and John Tartaglia, executive producers; Dave Goelz and Karen Prell, co-executive producers; Ritamarie Peruggi, producer; Leslie Cowan, line producer	Apple TV+	
2023 (2nd)	Ivy and Bean: Doomed to Dance	Mandy Spencer-Phillips, executive producer; Anne Brogan and Melanie Stokes, producers	Netflix	
2023 (2nd)	Prom Pact	Anya Adams, Julie Bowen, Rachael Field, Jake Kasdan and Melvin Mar, executive producers; Warren Carr, producer	Disney Channel	
2024 (3rd)
2024 (3rd)	The Velveteen Rabbit	Michael Rose, executive producer; Martin Pope, producer; Tom Bidwell, co-executive producer / writer; David Collins and Jane Hawley, co-producers; Jennifer Perrott, director; Simon Quinn, animation producer; Rick Thiele, animation director	Apple TV+	
2024 (3rd)	Monster High 2	Arielle Boisvert, Adam Bonnett, Phil Breman, Frederic Soulie and Shawn Williamson, executive producers; David Magee, producer; Billy Eddy and Matt Eddy, writers; Todd Holland, director / writer / executive producer	Nickelodeon	
2024 (3rd)	The Naughty Nine	Suzanne Todd, executive producer; Alberto Belli, director; Jed Elinoff and Scott Thomas, executive producers / writers; Amy Gibbons and Jim Kontos, produced by	Disney Channel	
2024 (3rd)	The Slumber Party	Jennilee Cummings, Jake Fuller, Brian Grazer, Tony Hernandez, John Hodges, Ron Howard and Stephanie Sperber, executive producers; Matthew Spiegel, line producer; Eydie Faye, teleplay by; Veronica Rodriguez, director	Disney Channel	
2024 (3rd)	World's Best	Utkarsh Ambudkar and Terry Gould, executive producers; Thomas Kail and Kate Sullivan, producers	Disney+	
2025 (4th)
2025 (4th)	Descendants: The Rise of Red	Gary Marsh and Suzanne Todd, executive producers; Mahita P. Simpson, co-executive producer; Wendy S. Williams, producer; Dan Frey and Ru Sommer, writers; Jennifer Phang, co-executive producer / director	Disney Channel / Disney+	
2025 (4th)	Alexander and the Terrible, Horrible, No Good, Very Bad Road Trip	Eva Longoria, Emily Morris and Shelly Strong, executive producers; Matt Lopez, writer; Marvin Lemus, director; Dan Cohen, Lisa Henson, Dan Levine and Shawn Levy, produced by	Disney+	
2025 (4th)	Girl Haunts Boy	William Andrew, Amy Friedman, Kimberly Howitt, Ryan Malachowsky, Gloria Ponce, Tracy K Price, Tamara Rothenberg and Jill Sanford, executive producers; Mark Burton and Aaron Parry, producers; Cesar Vitale, writer; Emily Ting, director	Fifth Season	
2025 (4th)	Henry Danger: The Movie	Ron French and Jace Norman, executive producers; Jake Farrow and Christopher J. Nowak, executive producers / writers; Joe Menendez, executive producer / director	Nickelodeon	
