= Sneakerella =

2022 film by Elizabeth Allen Rosenbaum

- Official release poster
- Directed by: Elizabeth Allen Rosenbaum
- Screenplay by: David Light; Joseph Raso; Tamara Chestna; Mindy Stern; George Gore II
- Story by: Mindy Stern; George Gore II; David Light; Joseph Raso
- Based on: Cinderella by Charles Perrault
- Produced by: Christopher Scott; Jane Startz; Rachel Watanabe-Batton
- Starring: Chosen Jacobs; Lexi Underwood; Devyn Nekoda; Bryan Terrell Clark; Kolton Stewart; Hayward Leach; Robyn Alomar; Yvonne Senat Jones; Juan Chioran; John Salley
- Cinematography: Matt Sakatani Roe
- Edited by: Ishai Setton
- Music by: Elvin Ross
- Production companies: Jane Startz Productions; Maple Plus Productions Inc.; Disney Channel
- Distributed by: Disney+ Disney Platform Distribution
- Release date: May 13, 2022
- Running time: 112 minutes
- Country: United States
- Language: English

Sneakerella is a 2022 American musical comedy film directed by Elizabeth Allen Rosenbaum and written by David Light & Joseph Raso, Tamara Chestna, Mindy Stern, and George Gore II. A re-imagining of the classic fairy tale Cinderella, the film stars Chosen Jacobs, Lexi Underwood, Devyn Nekoda, Bryan Terrell Clark, Kolton Stewart, Hayward Leach, Robyn Alomar, Yvonne Senat Jones, Juan Chioran, and John Salley.

Produced by Disney Channel and Jane Startz Productions, the film was released on Disney+ on May 13, 2022. The film received generally positive reviews from critics. Sneakerella was nominated for 11 Children's and Family Emmy Awards at its inaugural ceremony, winning four awards including Outstanding Fiction Special and Outstanding Music Direction and Composition for a Live Action Program.

== Plot ==
In Queens, teenage orphan El works in his late mother's shoe store "Laces", now run by his stepfather Trey, who overworks El instead of his stepbrothers Zelly and Stacy. El closes the store early to join his best friend and fellow sneakerhead Sami at the release of a new sneaker, where they meet a girl named Kira, who is impressed by El's insight into people from looking at their shoes. They miss the drop, but El shows Kira around his neighborhood, losing track of time as they fall for each other.

El is forced to rush back the store without a way to contact Kira, and is grounded by Trey, to his stepbrothers’ delight. Kira returns home, and is revealed to be the daughter of sneaker mogul and former basketball star Darius King. Inspired by El, Kira suggests that her older sister Liv's shoe design is too “basic” and convinces their father to let her look for another original design before the upcoming SneakerCon.

Learning Kira's identity, Sami and El plan to sneak into King's charity gala to find her. Overwhelmed by running the business alone, Trey has decided to sell the store, leading El to draw on memories of his mother and create a unique shoe design, with inspiration and help from the neighborhood. The night of the gala, Zelly and Stacy trap El in the stockroom, but he is rescued by Gustavo, the community garden's magical caretaker. He provides El and Sami with outfits, tickets, and a classic convertible to reach the gala, but warns that they must leave by midnight.

At the event, El's custom-made shoes become the talk of the crowd, as Sami inadvertently spreads rumors that El is a sought-after independent designer. El reunites with Kira, who prepares to introduce him to her father as the designer everyone is talking about, but he and Sami are forced to flee at midnight. El loses one of his shoes on an escalator, which is found by Kira. Determined to track down the young mystery designer, Kira and Liv launch a viral campaign to find her “prince”.

El is unsure how to explain the truth to Kira, but Sami convinces him to reach out to her and arrange a meeting with her father. Realizing El's plan, Zelly and Stacy steal his other shoe, and El arrives just after his stepbrothers have informed Darius that El is merely a stock boy. El tries to explain himself, but Darius and Kira rebuke him for lying to them and send him away. As Trey prepares to close the store and move the family back to New Jersey, El throws away his designs, which are found by Gustavo.

Kira's mother suggests that her disappointment in El comes from trying too hard to meet her father's expectations, leading her to realize that she put just as much pressure on El herself. El wakes up to find a pair of sneakers from Gustavo, created from his design inspired by Kira. While Sami distracts his stepbrothers, El races to the King brand sneaker drop, where he and Kira apologize to each other.

Zelly and Stacy take off in the moving truck to confront El, and Sami urges Trey to see how unfairly he has been treating El since his mother's death. El convinces Darius of his good intentions, his talent, and his feelings for Kira, but is interrupted by his stepbrothers. Trey arrives, reining in his sons. He apologizes for being so hard on El, and asks for a second chance to be a real father to El, while Darius declares El his new designer.

One year later, El is in a relationship with Kira, and has transformed Laces into “El-evate”, his own sneaker store pushing new and creative designs for all of Queens.

== Cast ==
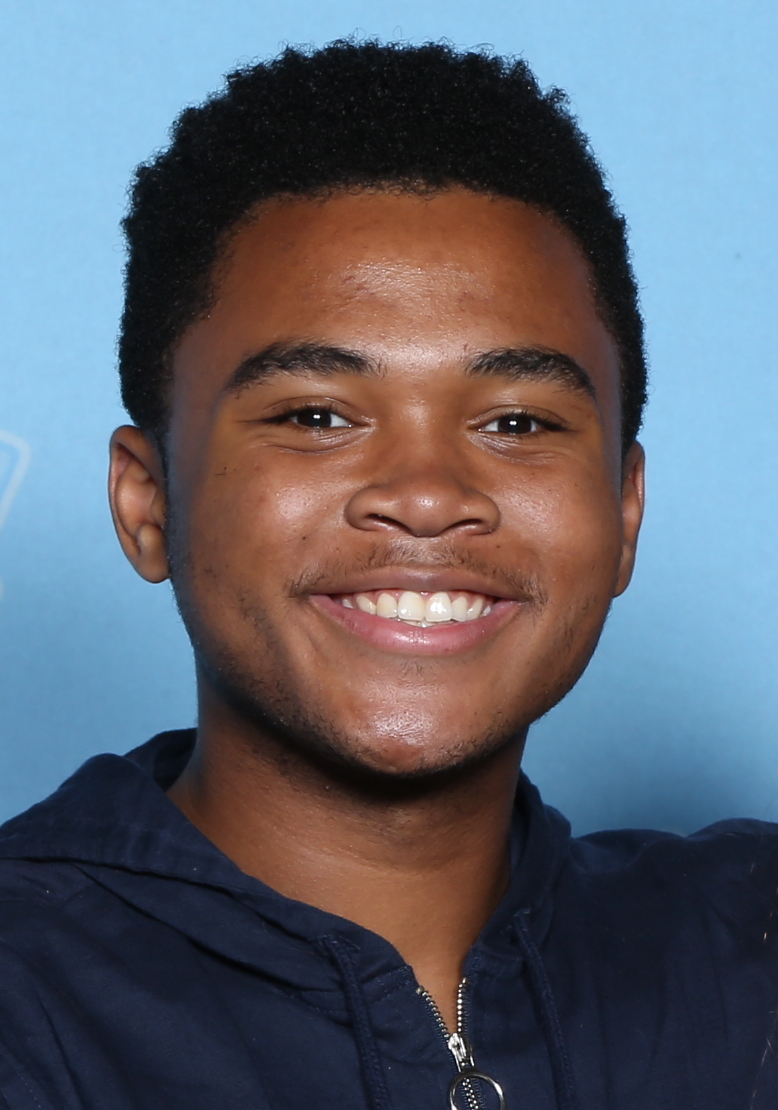
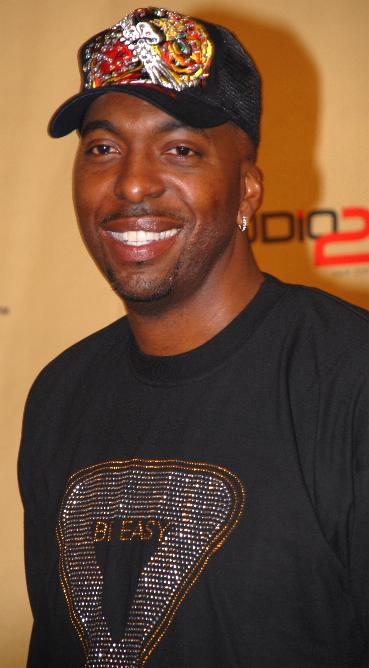
Chosen Jacobs plays the lead role of El and John Salley plays Darius King.
- Chosen Jacobs as El, an aspirant sneaker designer from Queens who works as a stock boy in his late mother's shoe store.
- Lexi Underwood as Kira King, the beautiful and "fiercely independent" daughter of Darius King.
- John Salley as Darius King, a sneaker tycoon and former basketball star.
- Yvonne Senat Jones as Denise King, Darius' wife.
- Devyn Nekoda as Sami, El's openly lesbian best friend.
- Juan Chioran as Gustavo, a friendly neighbor of El's.
- Robyn Alomar as Liv, Kira's sister.
- Bryan Terrell Clark as Trey, El's overburdened stepfather who runs his late wife's shoe store, from whom El keeps his sneaker designer talents a secret.
- Kolton Stewart as Zelly, El's mean-spirited stepbrother from whom El keeps his sneaker designer talents a secret.
- Hayward Leach as Stacy, El's mean-spirited stepbrother and Zelly's brother from whom El keeps his sneaker designer talents a secret.
- Mekdes Teshome as Rosie, El's late mother who was loved by all.
- Elia Press as Sneakerhead, always on the look out for the latest sneaker drop.
- Andrew Ward as Sneaker Buster, a popular sneaker authenticator social media influencer.
- William Crockett as Sneak-Disser, a battle rapper known for his fresh kicks.

== Production ==
=== Development ===
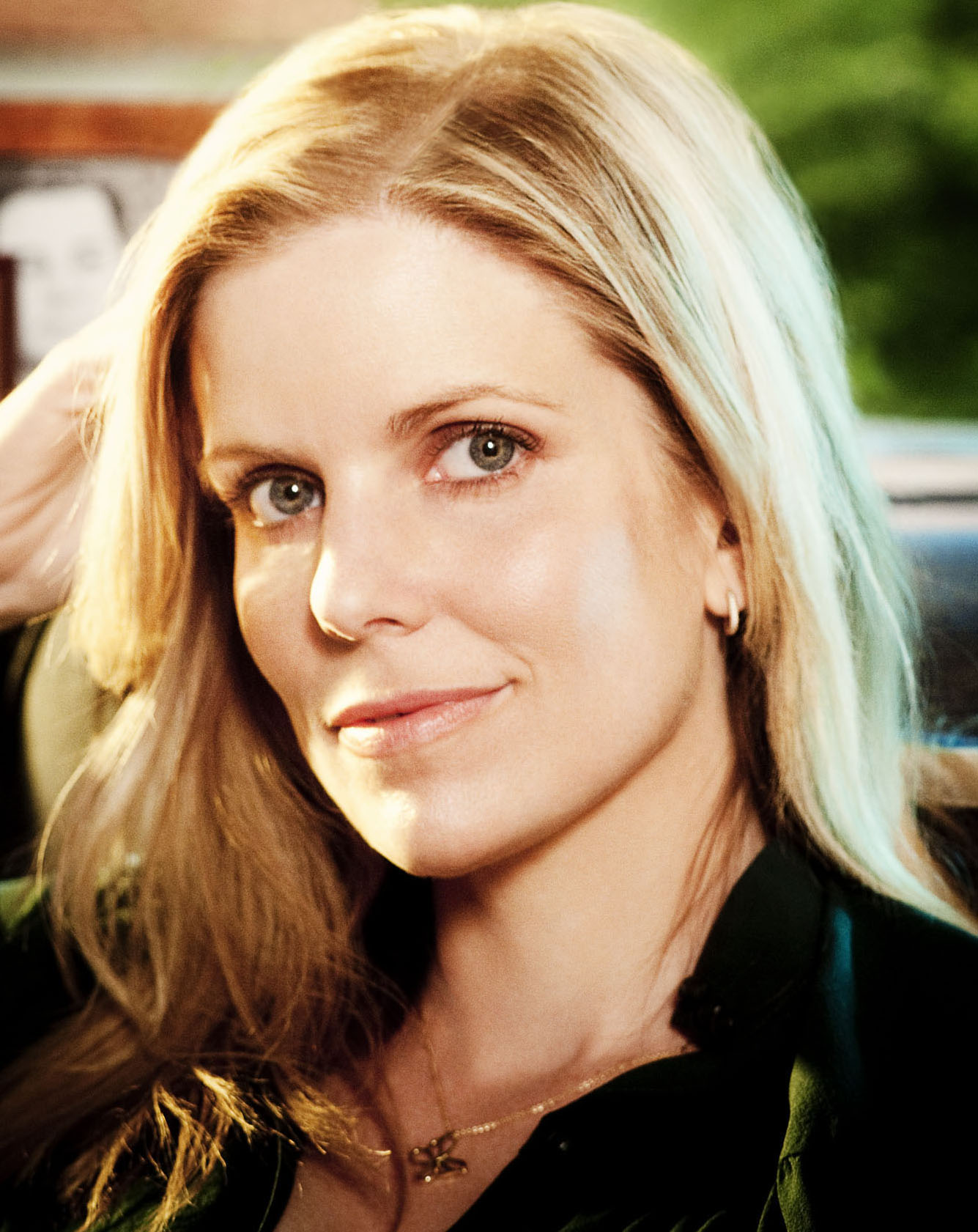
Director Elizabeth Allen Rosenbaum

In October, 2020, it was reported that Disney had begun production on Sneakerella, a modern re-imagining of the Cinderella story centered around sneaker culture, for Disney+. David Light, Joseph Raso, Tamara Chestna, Mindy Stern, and George Gore II were writing the script, with Elizabeth Allen Rosenbaum directing. Chosen Jacobs, Lexi Underwood, John Salley, Yvonne Senat Jones, Devyn Nekoda, Juan Chioran, Robyn Alomar, Bryan Terrell Clark, Kolton Stewart and Hayward Leach were announced to have been cast in the movie. It was also reported that Allen will co-executive-produce the film, with Jane Startz and Rachel Watanabe-Batton serving as executive producers. Disney Channel was reported to be producing the movie.

=== Filming ===
Filming was originally set to begin in May 2020 in Toronto and Hamilton, Ontario, Canada, but was postponed due to the COVID-19 pandemic. Production on Sneakerella began on October 19, 2020, and ended on December 9, 2020.

== Music ==
Sneakerella features 13 songs. The first single "Kicks" was released on April 29, 2022. The soundtrack was released on May 13, 2022, the same day as the film. Alongside original songs created for the film, it also features a cover of "A Dream Is a Wish Your Heart Makes" from Disney's animated film of Cinderella, sung by Chosen Jacobs and Lexi Underwood.

== Release ==
Originally, Sneakerella was scheduled to be released in 2021. The release was at first shifted to February 18, 2022, on Disney+ but was then delayed to May 13, 2022. While initially reported delayed again, its May 13 release date was confirmed in April.

The film made its linear premiere on Disney Channel in the United States on August 13, 2022.

== Reception ==
=== Critical reception ===
On the review aggregator website Rotten Tomatoes, 92% of 13 critics' reviews are positive, with an average rating of 7.7/10.

Courtney Howard of Variety found that the film manages to be a satisfying refreshing take on Cinderella, praised the narrative for its contemporary approach on the original tale's plot points, complimented the performances of the cast and the chemistry between the characters, while commending the soundtrack and the costumes, while criticizing some clichés that the film provides. Radhika Menon of Decider found that the film provides a solid modern perspective on Cinderella through its gender-swapped story and the diversity of its cast, praised the humor and the chemistry between the characters, while complimenting the songs of the film, drawing comparisons with Hamilton and In The Heights.

Jennifer Green of Common Sense Media rated the film 4 out of 5 stars, stated that the story promotes different positive messages, such as being true to oneself and the difficulty for women to become entrepreneurs, found that the film manages to depict several role models that are positive, while praising the diversity among the characters across their national origins and sexuality. Amy Amatangelo of Paste rated the film 7.6 out of 10 and found Jacobs and Underwood charismatic and delightful, acclaimed the songs and the choreography, but found some plot points to be nonsensical, while claiming that Nekoda's character was undeveloped. Abhishek Srivastava of The Times of India rated the film 3.5 out of 5 stars and claimed that the film recalls hallmarks of Bollywood blockbusters with its plot, colors, and different songs, stated that the film manages to provide an effective fresh take on Cinderella, while praising the performances of the cast.

=== Accolades ===
Year	Award	Category	Recipient	Result	Ref.
2022	Children's and Family Emmy Awards	Outstanding Fiction Special	Sneakerella	Won	
2022	Children's and Family Emmy Awards	Outstanding Art Direction/Set Decoration/Scenic Design	Elisa Suave	Nominated	
2022	Children's and Family Emmy Awards	Outstanding Cinematography for a Live Action Single-Camera Program	Matthew Sakatani Roe	Nominated	
2022	Children's and Family Emmy Awards	Outstanding Choreography	Emilio Dosal	Won	
2022	Children's and Family Emmy Awards	Outstanding Costume Design/Styling	Rachael Grubbs	Nominated	
2022	Children's and Family Emmy Awards	Outstanding Makeup and Hairstyling	Brian Hui, Jen Fisher	Nominated	
2022	Children's and Family Emmy Awards	Outstanding Directing for a Single Camera Program	Elizabeth Allen Rosenbaum	Nominated	
2022	Children's and Family Emmy Awards	Outstanding Editing for a Single Camera Program	Ishai Setton	Won	
2022	Children's and Family Emmy Awards	Outstanding Music Direction and Composition for a Live Action Program	Elvin Ross	Won	
2022	Children's and Family Emmy Awards	Outstanding Original Song	"In Your Shoes" – William Behlendorf, Jason Mater, Brandon Rogers	Nominated	
2022	Children's and Family Emmy Awards	Outstanding Original Song	"Kicks" – Antonina Armato, Tim James Price, Adam Schmalholz, Thomas Armato Sturges	Nominated	
2022	Directors Guild of Canada Awards	Outstanding Achievement in Production Design - Television Movie/Mini-Series	Elisa Sauve	Won	
2023	Women's Image Network Awards				
2023	Women's Image Network Awards	Outstanding Made For Television Movie / Limited Series	Sneakerella	Nominated	
2023	Women's Image Network Awards	Outstanding Actress Made For Television Movie / Limited Series	Lexi Underwood	Nominated	
