= 1st Children's and Family Emmy Awards =

- Date: December 10–11, 2022
- Location: Wilshire Ebell Theatre, Los Angeles
- Presented by: National Academy of Television Arts and Sciences
- Hosted by: JoJo Siwa (December 10); Jack McBrayer (December 11)

Highlights
- Most awards: Heartstopper (5)
- Most nominations: The Mysterious Benedict Society and Sneakerella (11)
- Outstanding Preschool Series: Sesame Street
- Outstanding Children's or Family Viewing Series: The Baby-Sitters Club
- Outstanding Young Teen Series: Heartstopper

The 1st Children's and Family Emmy Awards were presented by the National Academy of Television Arts and Sciences (NATAS) to honor the best in American children's and family-oriented television programming in 2021 and 2022. The eligibility period ran from January 1, 2021, to May 31, 2022; starting the following year, the eligibility window will be from June 1 to May 31 every year. The winners were announced during two ceremonies—one focused on creative and technical arts, and the other dedicated to performances and programming—that were held at Wilshire Ebell Theatre, Los Angeles on December 10 and 11, 2022. Dancer and media personality JoJo Siwa hosted the December 10 ceremony, while the December 11 ceremony was hosted by actor and comedian Jack McBrayer.

On November 17, 2021, the NATAS announced the creation of the Children's and Family Emmy Awards to recognize the best in children's and family television. The organization cited an "explosive growth in the quantity and quality of children's and family programming" as justification for a dedicated ceremony. Many categories of the awards were previously presented at the Daytime Emmy Awards.

Nominations were announced on November 1, 2022, with programs The Mysterious Benedict Society and Sneakerella leading with 11 nods each. American actor and television host LeVar Burton received the inaugural Lifetime Achievement award.

== Winners and nominees ==
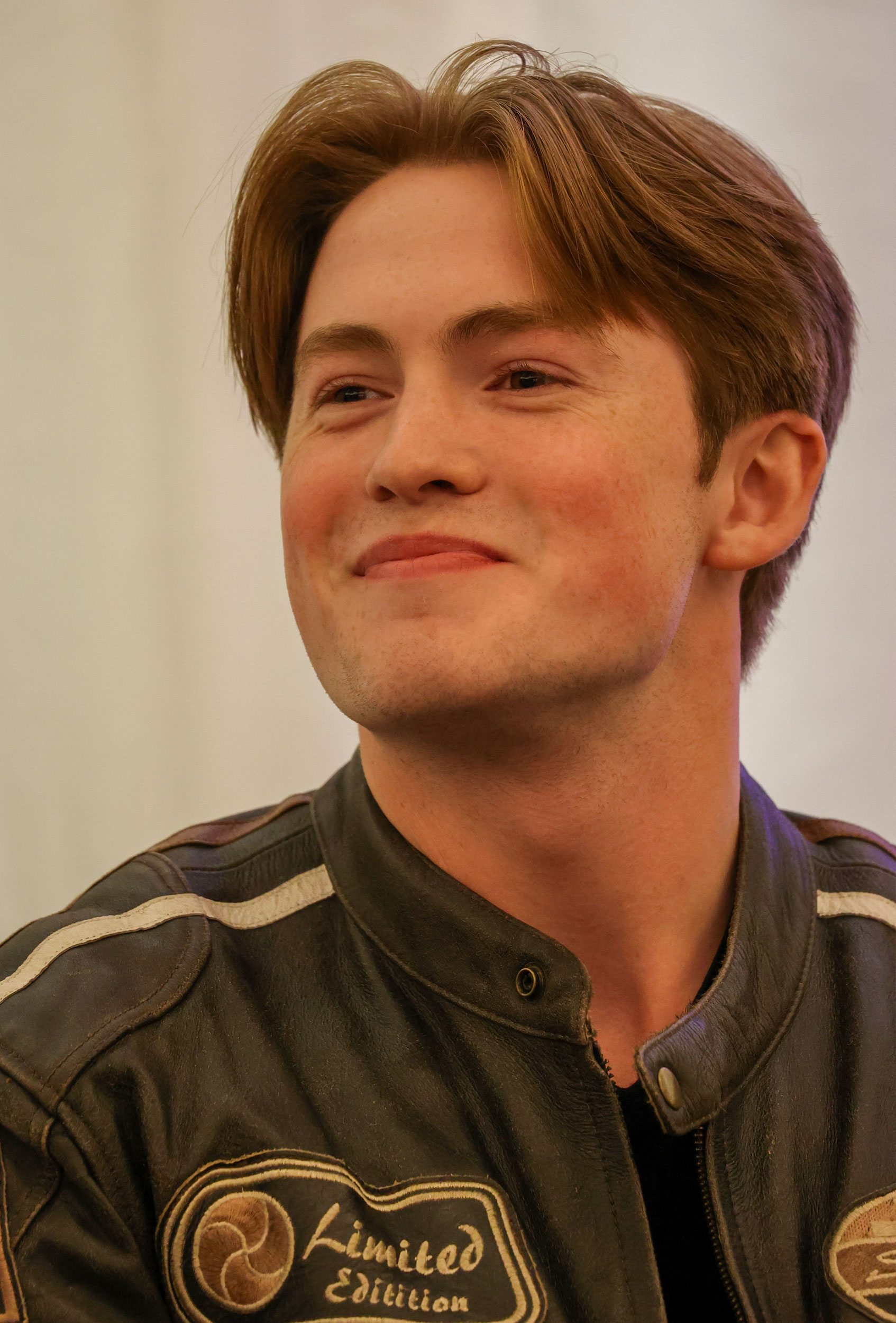
Kit Connor, Outstanding Lead Performance in a Preschool, Children's or Young Teen Program winner

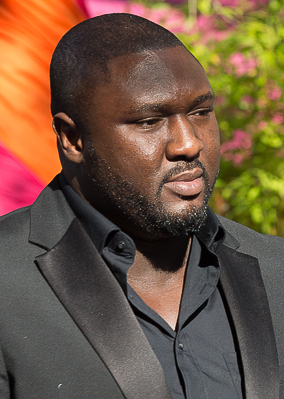
Nonso Anozie, Outstanding Supporting Performance in a Preschool, Children's or Young Teen Program winner

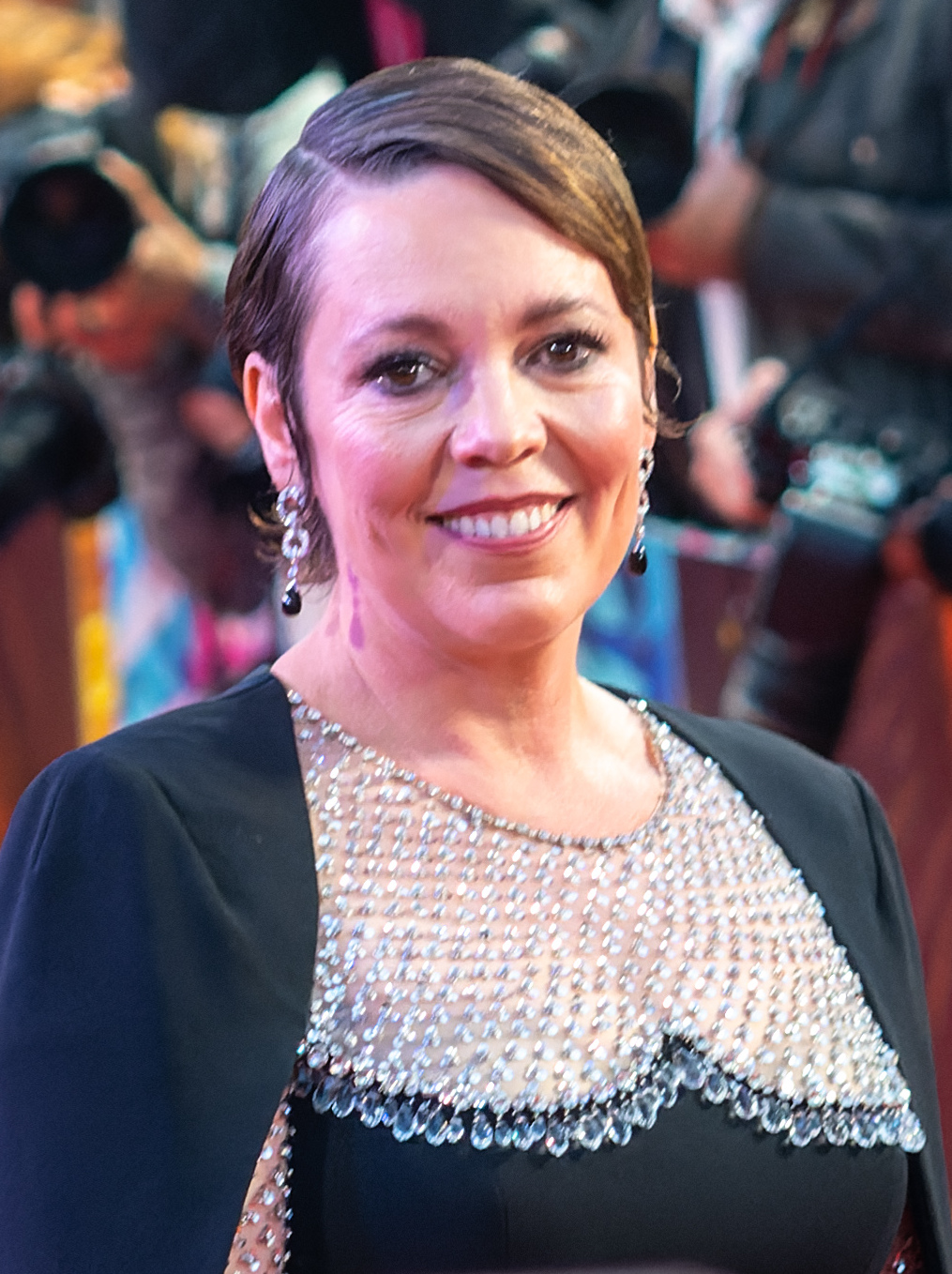
Olivia Colman, Outstanding Guest Performance in a Preschool, Children's or Young Teen Program winner

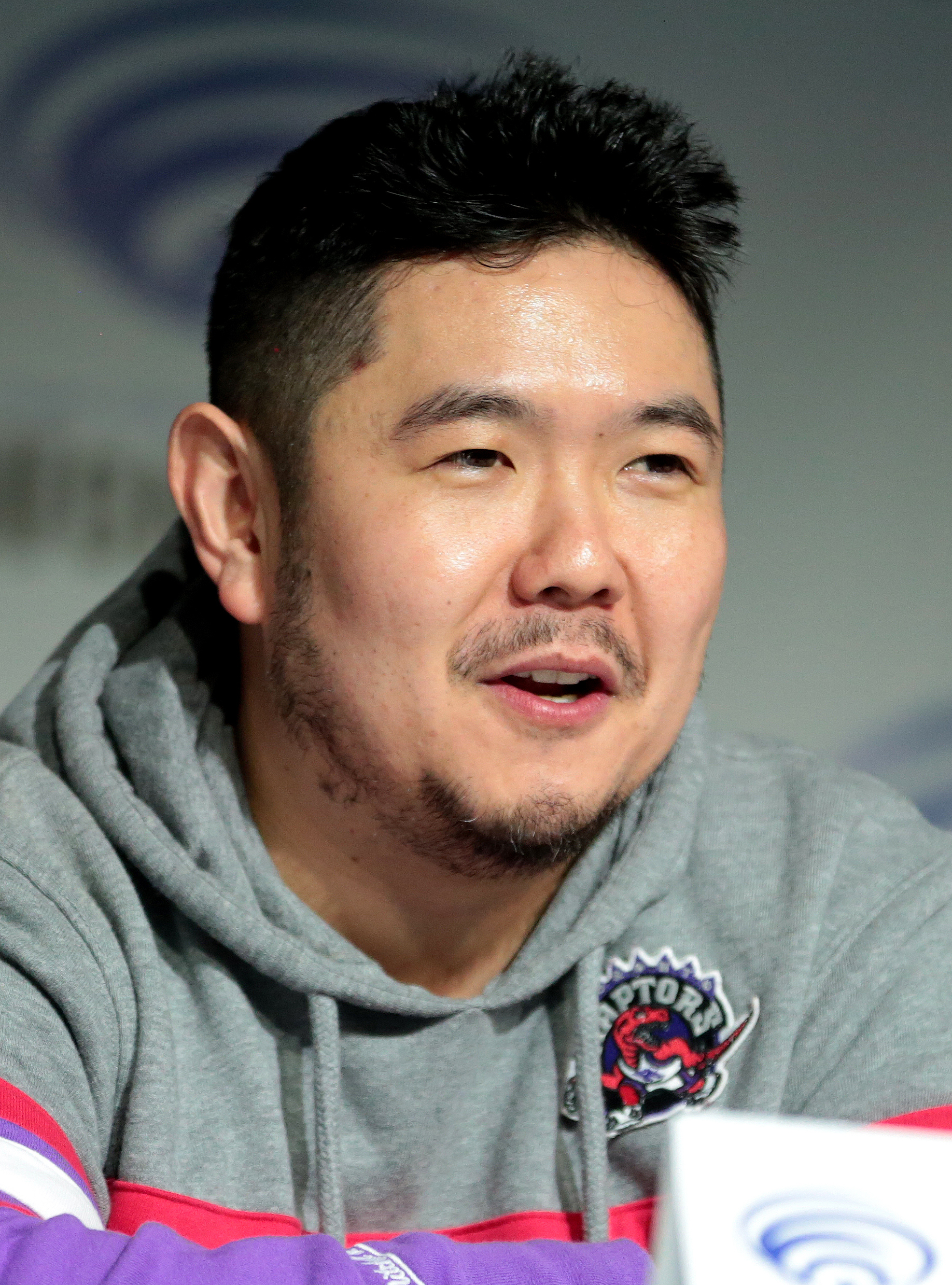
Eric Bauza, Outstanding Voice Performance in an Animated Program winner

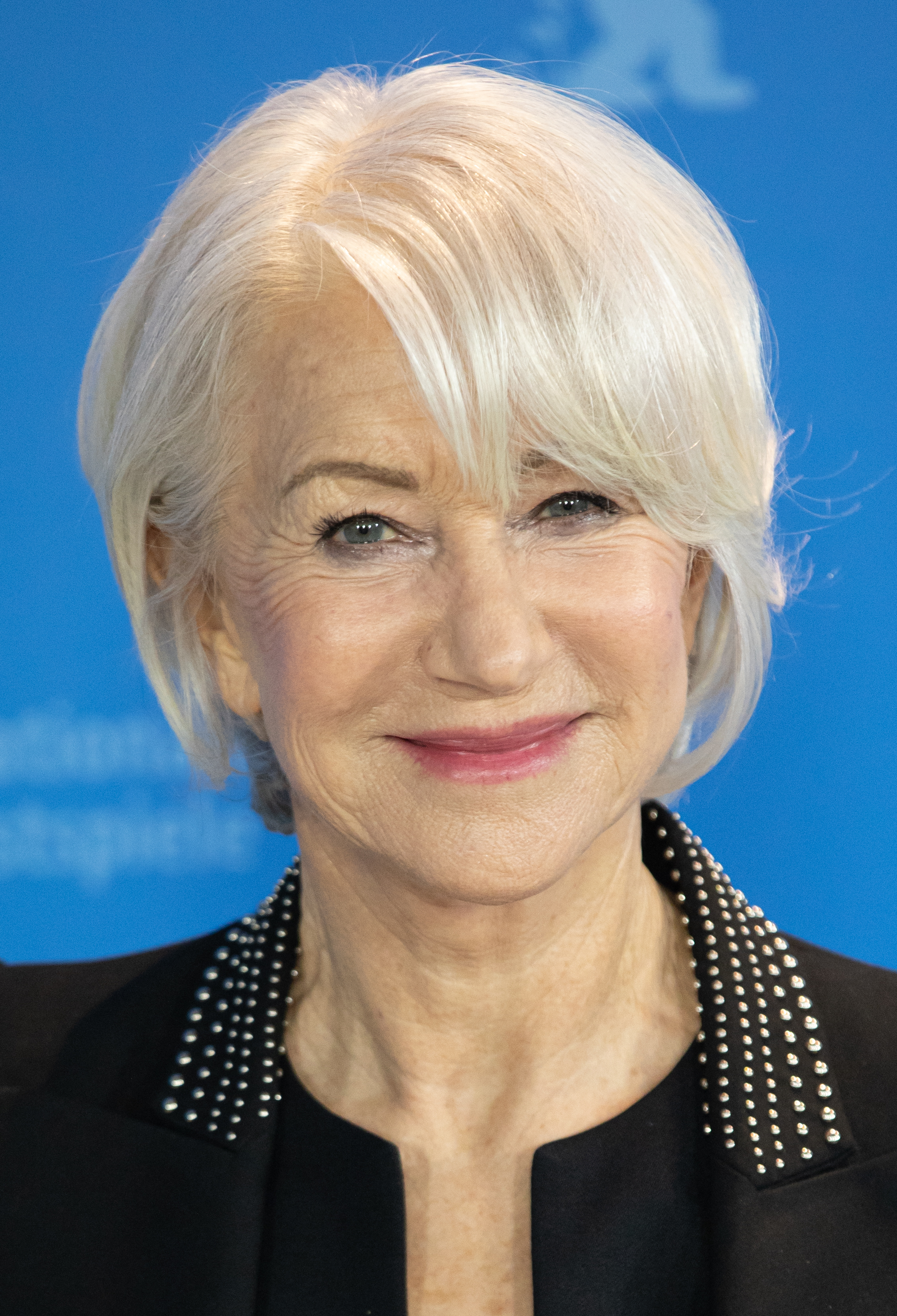
Helen Mirren, Outstanding Host winner

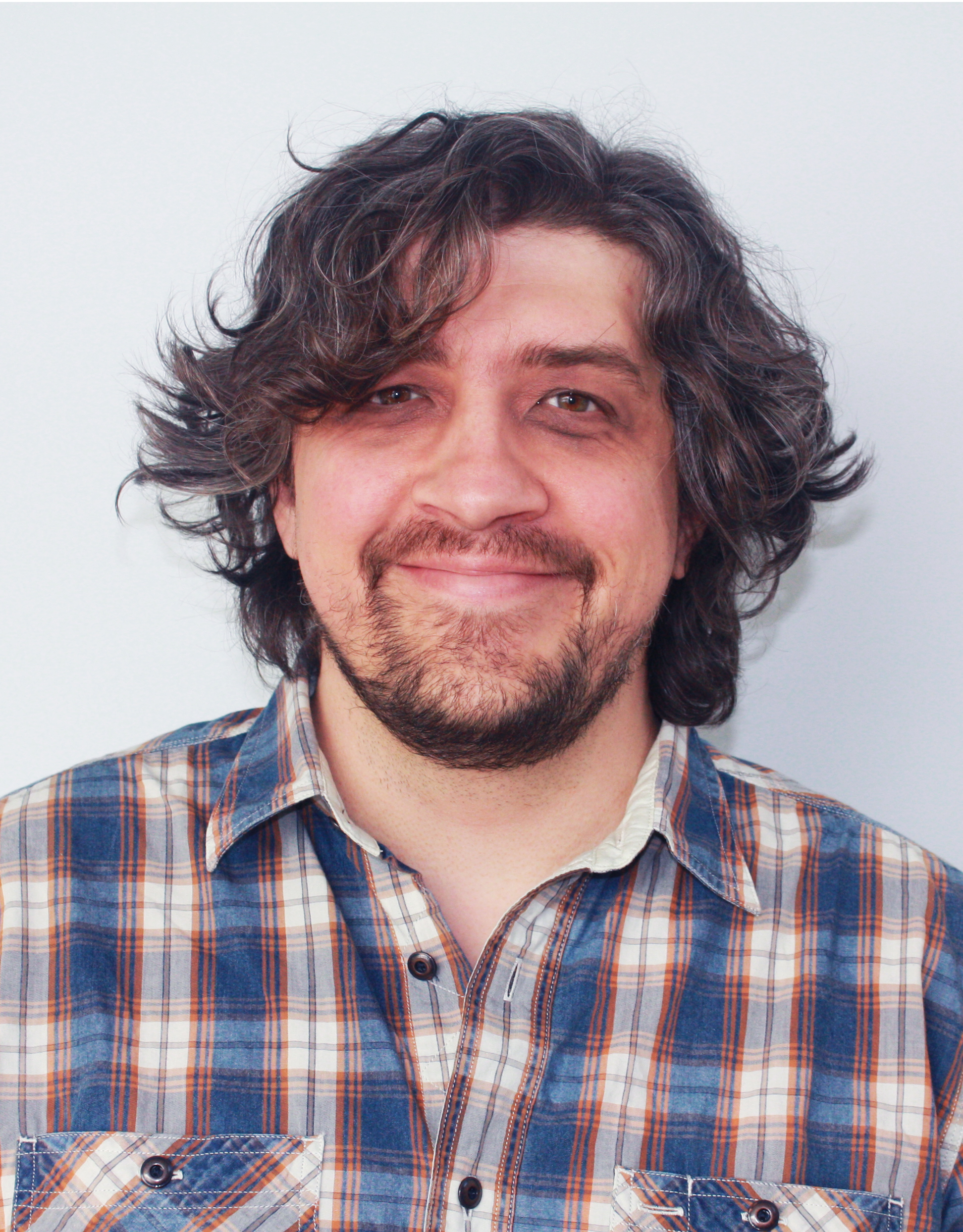
Craig McCracken, Individual Achievement in Animation co-winner

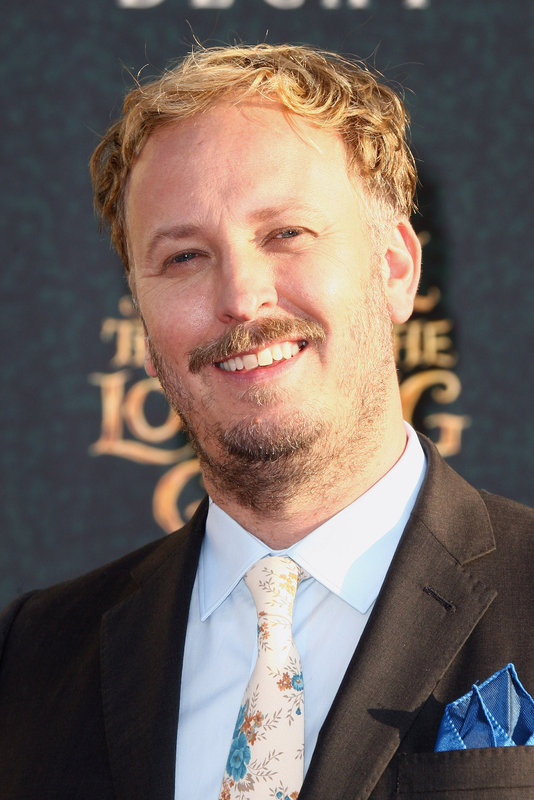
James Bobin, Outstanding Directing for a Single Camera Program co-winner

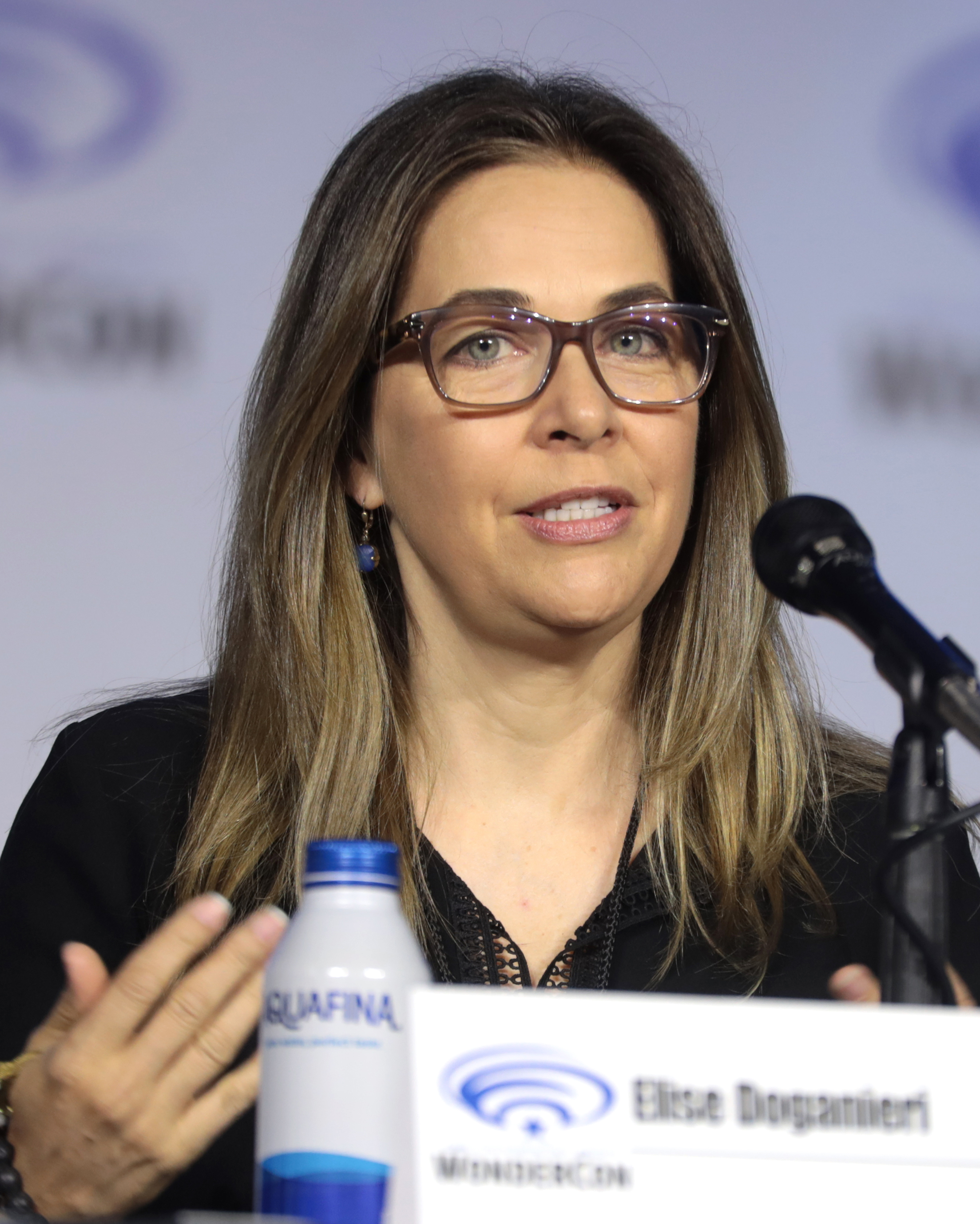
Elise Doganieri, Outstanding Directing for a Multiple Camera Program co-winner

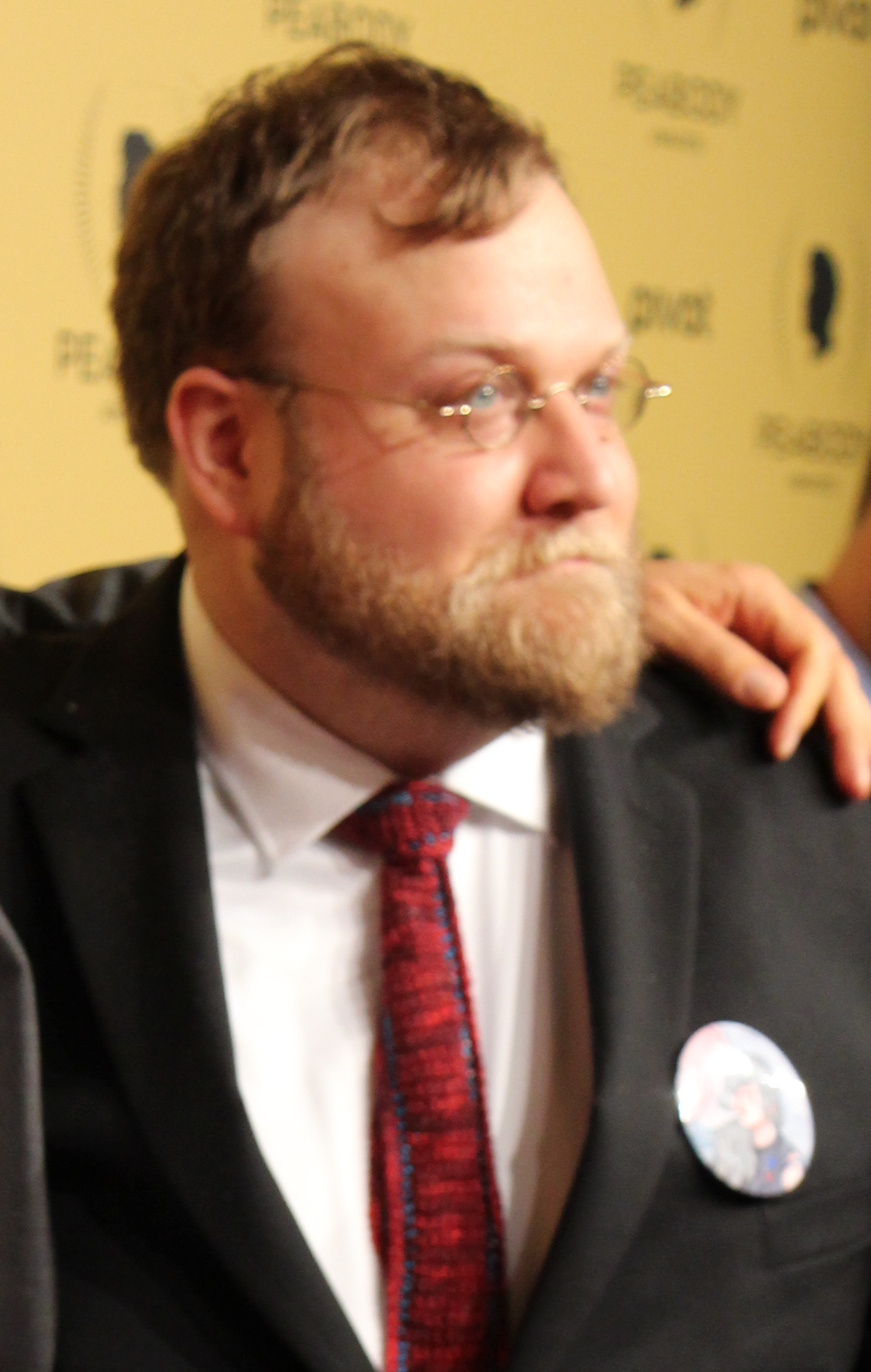
Pendleton Ward, Outstanding Directing for an Animated Program co-winner

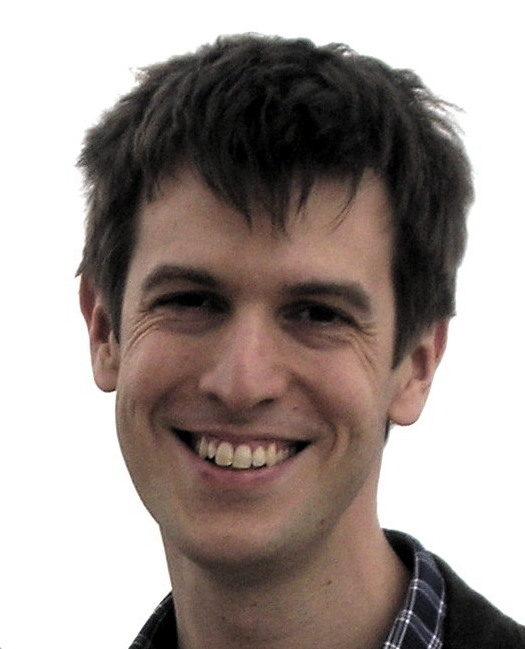
Christopher Willis, Outstanding Music Direction and Composition for an Animated Program winner

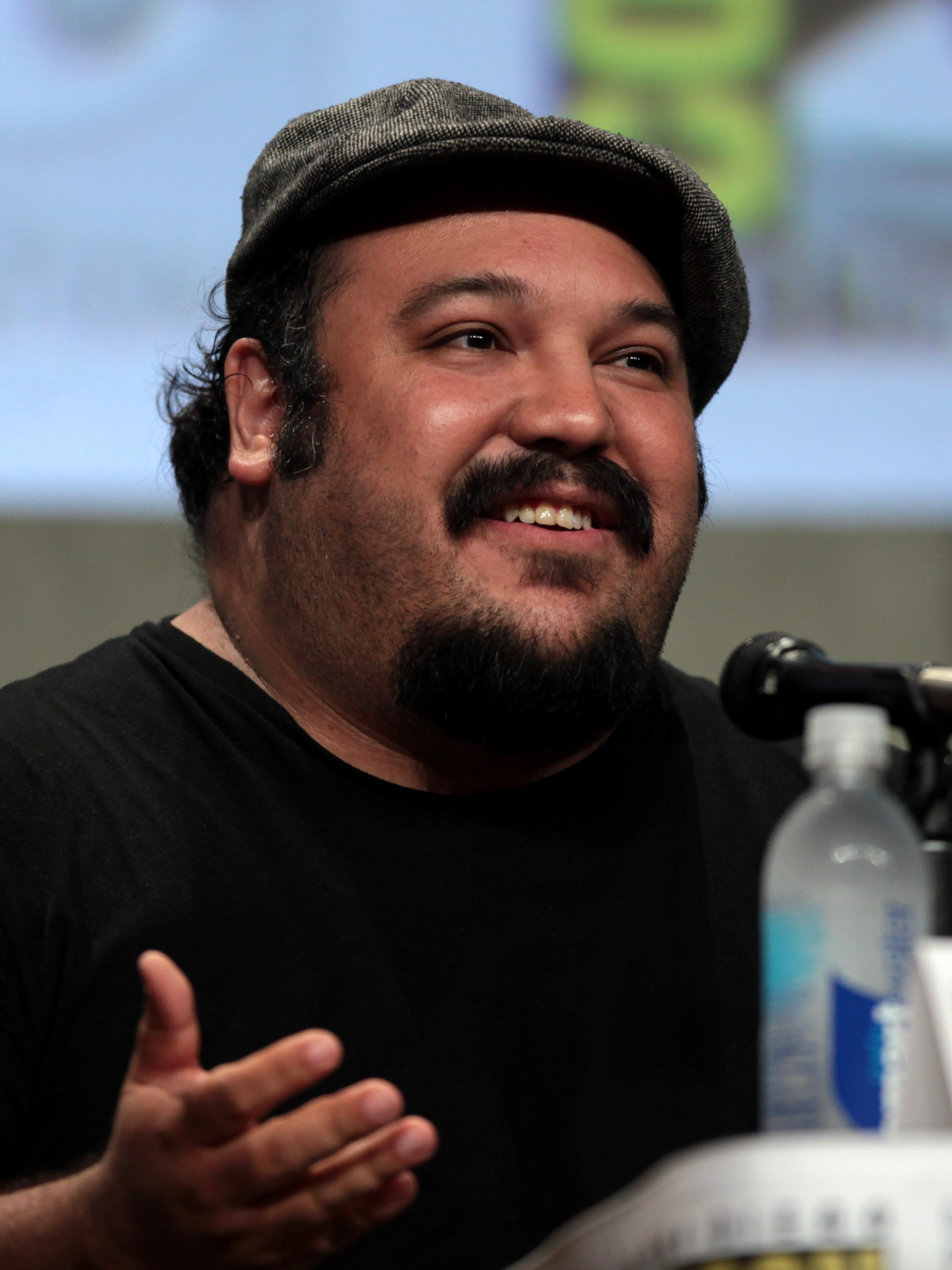
Jorge R. Gutierrez, Outstanding Writing for an Animated Program co-winner

The nominees were announced on November 1, 2022.

=== Programming ===
Programming
Outstanding Preschool Series: Sesame Street (HBO Max/PBS Kids); Helpsters (Apple TV+); The Not-Too-Late Show with Elmo: Game Edition (HBO Max); Tab Time (YouTube Originals); Waffles + Mochi (Netflix)	Outstanding Children's or Family Viewing Series: The Baby-Sitters Club (Netflix); The Astronauts (Nickelodeon); Fraggle Rock: Back to the Rock (Apple TV+); Raising Dion (Netflix); Secrets of Sulphur Springs (Disney Channel)
Outstanding Young Teen Series: Heartstopper (Netflix); Doogie Kameāloha, M.D. (Disney+); First Day (Hulu); High School Musical: The Musical: The Series (Disney+); The Mysterious Benedict Society (Disney+)	Outstanding Fiction Special: Sneakerella (Disney+); Better Nate Than Ever (Disney+); Muppets Haunted Mansion (Disney+); See Us Coming Together: A Sesame Street Special (HBO Max); Spin (Disney Channel); Waffles + Mochi's Holiday Feast (Netflix)
Outstanding Non-Fiction Program: Who Are You, Charlie Brown? (Apple TV+); Hi I'm Sevy (Magnolia Network); Kids Baking Championship (Food Network); Nick News (Nickelodeon); Sesame Street in Communities: Talking About Race (YouTube.com)	Outstanding Preschool Animated Series: Ada Twist, Scientist (Netflix); Molly of Denali (PBS); Octonauts: Above & Beyond (Netflix); Santiago of the Seas (Nickelodeon); Xavier Riddle and the Secret Museum (PBS)
Outstanding Animated Series: City of Ghosts (Netflix); The Cuphead Show! (Netflix); The Proud Family: Louder and Prouder (Disney+); Star Trek: Prodigy (Paramount+); A Tale Dark & Grimm (Netflix)	Outstanding Special Class Animated Program: Hilda and the Mountain King (Netflix); El Deafo (Apple TV+); Hotel Transylvania: Transformania (Amazon Prime Video); Maya and the Three (Netflix); Trollhunters: Rise of the Titans (Netflix)
Outstanding Short Form Program: We the People (Netflix); Ciao Alberto (Disney+); Little Bird (Vimeo); Rhymes Through Times (Noggin); Sesame Street in Communities: Explaining Race | #ComingTogether (YouTube.com)	Outstanding Interactive Media: Madrid Noir (Oculus TV); Cat Burglar (Netflix); In Space with Markiplier (YouTube Originals); Namoo (Baobab Studios); Paper Birds (Oculus TV)
Outstanding Promotional Announcement: Maya and the Three (Netflix); CHOOSE KINDNESS Campaign (ABC); Dragons: The Nine Realms (Hulu and Peacock); Jurassic World Camp Cretaceous (Netflix); My Squishy Little Dumplings (Nickelodeon); PBS KIDS: "You Taught Me" Brand Campaign (PBS)

=== Performer ===
Performer
Outstanding Lead Performance in a Preschool, Children's or Young Teen Program: Kit Connor as Nick Nelson on Heartstopper (Netflix); Loretta Devine as M'Dear on Family Reunion (Netflix); Mark Feuerstein as Watson Brewer on The Baby-Sitters Club (Netflix); Joe Locke as Charlie Spring on Heartstopper (Netflix); Alicia Silverstone as Elizabeth Thomas-Brewer on The Baby-Sitters Club (Netflix); Rueby Wood as Nate on Better Nate Than Ever (Disney+)	Outstanding Supporting Performance in a Preschool, Children's or Young Teen Program: Nonso Anozie as Tommy Jepperd on Sweet Tooth (Netflix); Adeel Akhtar as Aditya Singh on Sweet Tooth (Netflix); Yasmin Finney as Elle Argent on Heartstopper (Netflix); William Gao as Tao Xu on Heartstopper (Netflix); Lisa Kudrow as Aunt Heidi on Better Nate Than Ever (Disney+)
Outstanding Younger Performer in a Preschool, Children's or Young Teen Program: Quinn Copeland as Izzy on Punky Brewster (Peacock); Malia Baker as Mary Anne Spier on The Baby-Sitters Club (Netflix); Sammi Haney as Esperanza on Raising Dion (Netflix); Momona Tamada as Claudia Kishi on The Baby-Sitters Club (Netflix); Ja'Siah Young as Dion Warren on Raising Dion (Netflix)	Outstanding Guest Performance in a Preschool, Children's or Young Teen Program: Olivia Colman as Sarah Nelson on Heartstopper (Netflix); Chris Diamantopoulos as Owen Quinn on Ghostwriter (Apple TV+); Sharon Lawrence as Susan on Punky Brewster (Peacock); Randall Park as Dr. Choi on Doogie Kameāloha, M.D. (Disney+); Gina Rodriguez as Grown-Up Elena on Diary of a Future President (Disney+)
Outstanding Voice Performance in a Preschool Animated Program: Daniel Ross as Donald Duck on Mickey and Minnie Wish Upon a Christmas (Disney Junior); David Errigo Jr. as Dudley on Ridley Jones (Netflix); Eden Espinosa as The Queen of Hearts on Alice's Wonderland Bakery (Disney Junior); Michael Luwoye as Wavey Jones on Baby Shark's Big Show! (Nickelodeon); Sherri Shepherd as Queen Fastine on Blaze and the Monster Machines (Nickelodeon)	Outstanding Voice Performance in an Animated Program: Eric Bauza as Bugs Bunny, Marvin the Martian, Daffy Duck, Tweety on Looney Tunes Cartoons (HBO/HBO Max); Grey DeLisle as Lola, Lana, Lily, Meryl, Cheryl, Scoots, Mopes & Mrs. Bernardo on The Loud House (Nickelodeon); Mark Hamill as Skeletor on Masters of the Universe: Revelation (Netflix); Tom Kenny as SpongeBob SquarePants on SpongeBob SquarePants (Nickelodeon); Frank Welker as Himself, Fred and Scooby on Scooby-Doo and Guess Who? (Cartoon Network)
Outstanding Younger Voice Performer in an Animated or Preschool Animated Program: Andy Walken as Young Durpleton on Centaurworld: Bunch O' Scrunch (Netflix); Asher Bishop as Lincoln Loud on The Loud House (Nickelodeon); Tucker Chandler as Alex on Madagascar: A Little Wild (Hulu and Peacock); Kyrie McAlpin as Emma on Doug Unplugs (Apple TV+); Amir O'Neil as Marty on Madagascar: A Little Wild (Hulu and Peacock)	Outstanding Host: Helen Mirren – Harry Potter: Hogwarts Tournament of Houses (Cartoon Network/TBS); Tabitha Brown – Tab Time (YouTube Originals); Recker Eans, Dylan Gilmer, Mykal-Michelle Harris, Olivia Perez – The Kids Tonight Show (Peacock); Jack McBrayer – Hello, Jack! The Kindness Show (Apple TV+); Coyote Peterson – Coyote Peterson's Wild Field Trip (YouTube Originals)

=== Art Direction ===
Art Direction
Outstanding Art Direction/Set Decoration/Scenic Design
- Fraggle Rock: Back to the Rock – Tyler Bishop Harron, Brentan Harron, Bill Ives, Evan Spence, Paul Healy, Alan McCullagh, Ian Nothnagel (Apple TV+)
- Muppets Haunted Mansion – Darcy Prevost, Kathryn Molenaar, Mark D. Allen, Jeanine Ringer (Disney+)
  - The Barbarian and the Troll – Matthew Budgeon, Gary Kordan, John Alvarez, Tricia Robertson, Kelsey Fowler, David Manske (Nickelodeon)
  - Sneakerella – Elisa Suave (Disney+)
  - The Mysterious Benedict Society – Michael Wylie, Marshall McMahen, Ide Foyle (Disney+)

=== Casting ===
Casting
Outstanding Casting for a Live-Action Program: Heartstopper – Daniel Edwards (Netflix); Better Nate Than Ever – Patrick Goodwin, Bethany Knox, Bernie Telsey (Disney+); Doogie Kameāloha, M.D. – Leslie Woo (Disney+); Muppets Haunted Mansion – Tony Shepherd, Anne McGinnis (Disney+); Sweet Tooth – Carmen Cuba, Stu Turner (Netflix)	Outstanding Casting for an Animated Program: The Proud Family: Louder and Prouder – Tatiana Bull, Aaron Drown, David H. Wright III (Disney+); Big Nate – Roxanne Escatel, Amanda Goodbread, Amy Zeis (Paramount+); Centaurworld – Linda Lamontagne (Netflix); Go! Go! Cory Carson – Kim Donovan (Netflix); Monsters at Work – Aaron Drown, Colleen Nuño-O’Donnell, Julia Pleasants, David H. Wright III (Disney+)

=== Animation ===
Individual Achievement in Animation
- The Cuphead Show! – Ivan Aguirre (Netflix)‡
- Kid Cosmic – Craig McCracken (Netflix)‡
- Kid Cosmic – Chris Tsirgiotis (Netflix)‡
- Maya and the Three – Alex Konstad (Netflix)‡
- Monsters at Work – Ron Tolentino Velasco (Disney+)‡
- SpongeBob SquarePants: "SpongeBob's Road to Christmas" – Benjamin Arcand (Nickelodeon)‡
- Star Trek: Prodigy – Alessandro Taini (Paramount+)‡

=== Cinematography and Lighting ===
Cinematography
Outstanding Cinematography for a Live Action Single-Camera Program: Better Nate Than Ever – Declan Quinn (Disney+); Fraggle Rock: Back to the Rock – Gavin Smith, Kirk Chiswell, Tim Milligan (Apple TV+); The Mysterious Benedict Society – Francois Dagenais (Disney+); Sneakerella – Matthew Sakatani Roe (Disney+); Waffles + Mochi – Christopher Gill, Jeremy Leach, John Tanzer (Netflix)	Outstanding Cinematography for a Live Action Multiple-Camera Program: Punky Brewster – Joe Pennella, Vance Brandon, Jack Chisholm, Eli Franks, Bob McCall, Bruce Pasternack (Peacock); Bunk'd – Gary Scott (Disney Channel); Family Reunion – John Simmons (Netflix); Just Roll with It – Joseph Wilmond Calloway (Disney Channel); Raven's Home – Bryan Hays (Disney+)
Outstanding Lighting Design for a Live Action Program: Harry Potter: Hogwarts Tournament of Houses – Simon Miles (Cartoon Network/TBS); Donkey Hodie – Joel K. Flory, Mark Kluiszo (PBS); Endlings – George Lajtai (Hulu); High School Musical: The Musical: The Series – Chris Reiter (Disney+); Sesame Street – Dan Kelley (HBO Max)

=== Choreography and Stunts ===
Choreography
Outstanding Choreography: Sneakerella – Emilio Dosal (Disney+); Better Nate Than Ever – Zach Woodlee (Disney+); The Fairly OddParents: Fairly Odder – Cynthia Nowak (Paramount+); High School Musical: The Musical: The Series – Zach Woodlee (Disney+); The J Team – Heather Laura Gray (Paramount+); Siwas Dance Pop Revolution – Jojo Siwa (Peacock)	Outstanding Stunt Coordination for a Live Action Program: Danger Force – Vince Deadrick Jr. (Nickelodeon); Endlings – Larissa Stadnichuk (Hulu); The Fairly OddParents: Fairly Odder – Brian Williams (Paramount+); Raising Dion – Jennifer Badger (Netflix); Side Hustle – William Wong (Nickelodeon)

=== Costumes, Makeup and Hairstyling ===
Styling
Outstanding Costume Design/Styling: The Mysterious Benedict Society – Catherine Adair (Disney+); High School Musical: The Musical: The Series – Maria Aguilar (Disney+); Odd Squad – Christine Toye (PBS); Raven's Home – Nancy Butts Martin, Carla Accardi Terner (Disney+); Sneakerella – Rachael Grubbs (Disney+)	Outstanding Makeup and Hairstyling: The Canterville Ghost – Paul Boyce, Helen Smith, Faye Adin (BYUtv); The Baby-Sitters Club – Florencia Cepeda, Ceilidh Dunn (Netflix); The Fairly OddParents: Fairly Odder – Joe Matke, Roma Goddard, Yunea Cruz, Danyell Weinberg, Michael Johnston, Julie Hassett, Gerardo Avila, Tyson Fountaine (Paramount+); Heartstopper – Diandra Ferreira, Sorcha Fisher, Melanie Lindsay (Netflix); High School Musical: The Musical: The Series – Shanda Palmer, Heidi Seeholzer (Disney+); Sneakerella – Brian Hui, Jen Fisher (Disney+); Warped! – Wendy J. Weiss, Erin B. Guth, Ashlyn R. McIntyre, Jeanette Jani Kleinbard, Tiphanie G. Baum, Myesha M. Starks, Janice J. Zoladz-Allison (Nickelodeon)

=== Directing ===
Directing
Outstanding Directing for a Single Camera Program: The Mysterious Benedict Society: Season 1 – Greg Beeman, James Bobin, Shannon Kohli, Karyn Kusama, Wendey Stanzler, Mark Tonderai, Glen Winter (Disney+); The Baby-Sitters Club: Seasons 2 – Kimmy Gatewood, Robert Luketic (Netflix); Sneakerella – Elizabeth Allen Rosenbaum (Disney+); Spin – Manjari Makijany (Disney Channel); Sweet Tooth – Toa Fraser, Robyn Grace, Jim Mickle, Alexis Ostrander (Netflix); Who Are You, Charlie Brown? – Michael Bonfiglio (Apple TV+)	Outstanding Directing for a Multiple Camera Program: The Quest – Jack Cannon, Harold Cronk, Elise Doganieri, Bertram van Munster (Disney+); Raven's Home – Evelyn Belasco, Mary Lou Belli, Sonia Bhalla, Robbie Countryman, Morenike Joela Evans, Danielle Fishel, Leonard R. Garner Jr. Victor Gonzalez, Ian Jordan, Bryan McKenzie, Jon Rosenbaum, Raven-Symoné, Lynda Tarryk (Disney Channel); Sesame Street – Marilyn Agrelo, Ken Diego, Richard Fernandes, Shannon Flynn, Kimmy Gatewood, Todd E. James, Jack Jameson, Benjamin Lehmann, Julie LoRusso, Linda Mendoza, Alan Muraoka, Liliana Olszewski, Scott Preston, Chuck Vinson, Matt Vogel (HBO Max); Top Chef Family Style – Shanra Kehl (Peacock); Zero Chill – Angelo Abela (Netflix)
Outstanding Directing for a Preschool Animated Program: Stillwater – Jun Falkenstein, Roy Burdine, Gary Hartle, Amber Tornquist Hollinger (Apple TV+); Ada Twist, Scientist – Jean Herlihy, Alan Moran, Seamus O'Toole, Amnon Schwarz, Shobhit Trivedi (Netflix); Daniel Tiger's Neighborhood – Tammy Langton, Ricardo Silva (PBS); Go! Go! Cory Carson – Adam Campbell, Jason Heaton, Vlad Kooperman, Uri Lotan, Stanley Moore, Alex Woo, François Perreau (Netflix); Muppet Babies: Season 3 – Jeremy Jensen, Guy Moore, Matt Danner (Disney Junior); Storybots: Learn to Read – Colin Lepper (Netflix)	Outstanding Directing for an Animated Program: City of Ghosts – Ako Castuera, Luis Grane, Elizabeth Ito, Bob Logan, Pendleton Ward (Netflix); Arlo the Alligator Boy – Ryan Crego (Netflix); Carmen Sandiego: Season 3 – Jos Humphrey, Mike West, Flavia Guttler (Netflix); Ciao Alberto – Kenna Harris (Disney+); Dug Days – Bob Peterson (Disney+); Hilda and the Mountain King – Andy Coyle, Megan Ferguson (Netflix)
Outstanding Voice Directing for an Animated Series: Centaurworld – Kristi Reed (Netflix); Amphibia – Eden Riegel (Disney Channel); Hilda and the Mountain King – David Peacock (Netflix); The Proud Family: Louder and Prouder: Season 1 – Ralph Farquhar, Bruce Smith (Disney+); Summer Camp Island: Seasons 4-5 – Kristi Reed (HBO Max)

=== Editing ===
Editing
Outstanding Editing for a Single Camera Program: Sneakerella – Ishai Setton (Disney+); Fraggle Rock: Back to the Rock – Duncan Christie, Marianna Khoury, Paul Winestock (Apple TV+); Sweet Tooth – Michael Berenbaum, Shawn Paper (Netflix); The Mysterious Benedict Society – David E.K. Abramson (Disney+); Who Are You, Charlie Brown? – Mikayla Irle, Tim K. Smith (Apple TV+)	Outstanding Editing for a Multiple Camera Program: Making Fun – Patrick Berry, Brady Haley, Brett McVicker, Jesse Soff, Bryn Vytlacil (Netflix); The Not-Too-Late Show with Elmo: Game Edition – Joseph DiGiacomo, Todd E. James, Fritz Archer, Ed Kulzer, Scott Owsley, Jordan Santora (HBO Max); Sesame Street – Joseph DiGiacomo, Todd E. James, Memo Salazar, William D'Amico, Ed Kulzer, Scott Owsley, Chris Reinhart, Jordan Santora, Rich Woolf Jr. (HBO Max); The Quest – Derek Esposito, Rob Chandler, Lindsay Ragone (Disney+); Top Chef Family Style – Steve Lichtenstein, Ericka Concha, Timothy Daniel, Chris King, Eric Lambert, Matthew Moul, Matt Reynolds, Anthony Rivard, Jay M. Rogers, Daniel Ruiz, Reggie Spangler (Peacock)
Outstanding Editing for a Preschool Animated Program: Trash Truck – Sally Bergom (Netflix); Beepers – Paal Rui, Billy Kostka, Zen Rosenthal (Cartoon Network); Go! Go! Cory Carson – T.M. Christopher, Greg Knowles (Netflix); Octonauts & the Ring of Fire – Tanner Adams, Marc Andre-Monten, Chris Avery, Chris Holmes (Netflix); Stillwater – Jill Calhoun, Jack Paulson (Apple TV+)	Outstanding Editing for an Animated Program: Ciao Alberto – Jennifer Jew (Disney+); Dug Days – Torbin Xan Bullock (Disney+); Maya and the Three – Myra Lopez (Netflix); Monsters at Work – Christopher Gee, Dan Molina, Jhoanne Reyes, Shawn Lemonnier (Disney+); Olaf Presents – Jeff Draheim (Disney+)

=== Main Title and Graphics ===
Main Title
Outstanding Main Title and Graphics
- Hilda and the Mountain King – Melissa Buisain, Jay Grandin, Conor Whelan, Eric Pautz (Netflix)
  - Big Nate – David Skelly, Sam Koji Hale, Jim Mortensen, Dennis Shelby, Vicki Scott (Paramount+)
  - The Ghost and Molly McGee – Steve Loter, Dave Knott, Steve Loter, Tony Molina, Noel Belknap (Disney Channel)
  - Green Eggs and Ham – Xanthe Bouma, Efrain Farias, Monica Grue, Jasmin Lai, Elaine Lee, Claire Nero, Jojo Park, Lauren Zurcher, Kevin Dart, Maria Torregrosa Domenech, Matt Herring, Tommy Rodricks, Jong-Ha Yoon (Netflix)
  - The Mysterious Benedict Society – Aaron Bjork, Michael Riley, Bob Swensen, Penelope Nederlander (Disney+)

=== Music ===
Music
Outstanding Music Direction and Composition for a Live Action Program: Sneakerella – Elvin Ross (Disney+); Better Nate Than Ever – Gabriel Mann (Disney+); The J Team – Luke Eisner, Jeannie Lurie, Gabriel Mann, Gus Ross, JoJo Siwa, Matthew Tishler, Andrew Underberg (Paramount+); The Mysterious Benedict Society – Theodore Shapiro, Joseph Shirley (Disney+); Ruby and the Well – Lora Bidner, Robert Carli (BYUtv)	Outstanding Music Direction and Composition for an Animated Program: Cat Burglar – Christopher Willis (Netflix); Looney Tunes Cartoons – Carl Johnson, Joshua Moshier (HBO/HBO Max); Snoopy Presents: To Mom (and Dad), With Love – Jeff Morrow (Apple TV+); The Tom & Jerry Show – Vivek Maddala, Steven Morrell (Boomerang); The Wonderful World of Mickey Mouse – Chris Willis (Disney+)
Outstanding Original Song: Sesame Street: "Friends with a Penguin" – Kathryn Raio-Rende, JP Rende, Ken Scarborough (HBO Max); Fancy Nancy: "If You Have a Dream" – Philip Bentley, Matthew Tishler, Andy Guerdat (Disney Junior); Sneakerella: "In Your Shoes" – William Behlendorf, Jason Mater, Brandon Rogers (Disney+); Sneakerella: "Kicks" – Antonina Armato, Tim James Price, Adam Schmalholz, Thomas Armato Sturges (Disney+); Snoopy Presents: It's the Small Things, Charlie Brown: "It's The Small Things, Charlie Brown" – Ben Folds (Apple TV+)

=== Sound ===
Sound
Outstanding Sound Mixing and Sound Editing for a Live Action Program: Sweet Tooth – George Haddad, Chad J. Hughes, Alexander Pugh, Alex Gruzdev, Sean Hessinger, Julie Altus, Mark Messenger, Mark Williams, Brad Sherman, John Sanacore, Catherine Harper, Rick Owens, Scott Francisco (Netflix); The Astronauts – Greg Hewett, Dean Giammarco, Bill Sheppard, Julia Graff, Aaron Olson, Maureen Murphy, Pat Haskill, Gord Hillier, David Chen, Gord Sproule (Nickelodeon); Raising Dion – Michael Wynne, Patrick Cyccone Jr., Scott Weber, Daniel Pagán, Jessica Harrison, Andrea Horta, Mason Kopeikin, Bob Costanza, Natalia Lubowiecka, Jacek Wiśniewski (Netflix); Scaredy Cats – Humberto Corte, Brody Ratsoy, Miguel Araujo, Alex Lara, Chris Fairfield, Iain Pattison, Nick Wright (Netflix); The Mysterious Benedict Society – Ian Tarasoff (Disney+)	Outstanding Sound Mixing and Sound Editing for a Preschool Animated Program: Octonauts & the Ring of Fire – Ewan Deane, Jamie Mahaffey, Iain Pattison, J. Martin Taylor, Nolan McNaughton, Dave Peacock and Sarah Faust (Netflix); Go! Go! Cory Carson – Alex Wilmer, Max Serwitz, Jonah Perry, Rain Yu Gu, Frank Chung Fan Liu, Vinicius Barbosa Pippa, Ryan Shore, Yeonhee Bae, Arman Sedgwick Billimoria, Audio Producer and Sae Wilmer (Netflix); Mecha Builders – Christopher Harris, Brandon Atabales-Schnitzler, Stephen Mullett, Earl Torno (HBO Max); Octonauts: Above & Beyond – Jamie Mahaffey J. Martin Taylor, Dave Peacock and Sarah Faust (Netflix)
Outstanding Sound Editing and Sound Mixing for an Animated Program: Maya and the Three – Jack Cucci, Tavish Grade, Andres Locsey, David Barbee, Masanobu "Tomi" Tomita, John Cucci, Dan O'Connell, Scott Martin Gershin, Chris Richardson, Andrew Vernon (Netflix); Ciao Alberto – Liz Marston, André Fenley, Nicholas Docter (Disney+); Hotel Transylvania: Transformania – Tateum Kohut, Will Files, Nerses Gezalyan, Nerseh Gezalyan, Katie Halliday, Dominick Certo, Curt Schulkey, James Morioka, Matt Cavanaugh, Justin Davey, Diego Perez, Ryan Sullivan, Greg Ten Bosch, Matt Yocum, Gouen Everett, Robin Harlan, Sarah Monat (Amazon Prime Video); Lego Star Wars: Terrifying Tales – Bonnie Wild, David Collins, Matthew Wood (Disney+); Trollhunters: Rise of the Titans – Carlos Sanches, Aran Tanchum, Otis Van Osten, Matt Hall, James Miller, Jason Oliver, Tommy Sarioglou, Vincent Guisetti (Netflix)

=== Visual and Special Effects ===
Effects
Outstanding Visual Effects for a Live Action Program: Endlings – Matthew J.R. Bishop, Terry Bradley, Cody McCaig, Daryl Shail, Teodora Ilie, Yulia Kopyttseva, Luba Kukharenko, Alyssa Schmidt (Hulu); The Mysterious Benedict Society – Moika Sabourin, Philippe Thibault, Marie-Pierre Boucher, Roberto Lobel, Jeremy Lambolez (Disney+); Sweet Tooth – Matt Bramante, Rob Price (Netflix); Waffles + Mochi – Alex Popkin, David Lebensfeld, Grant Miller, Evan Davies, Rachel Hanson, Matthew Poliquin, Chad Sigston, Claudia Dillard (Netflix)	Outstanding Special Effects Costumes, Hair and Makeup: The Quest – Mike Elizalde, Alan J. Gonzalez Ramirez, Rose Labarre, Tim Peters, Johnny Wujek, Sarah Dixey, Erica Adams, Alyn Topper, Lauren McKeever, Jennifer Tremont, Elle Favorule, Michelle Sfarzo, Sonia Caberera, Nancy Leonardi (Disney+); Danger Force – Kristin Dangl, Katie Gavin Elford, Tricia Bercsi Wilkin, Dina Dominguez, Jesse Hyatt, Brandy Lusvardi, Joe Matke, Roma Goddard, Yunea Cruz, Danyell Weinberg, Michael Johnston, Brad Look, Kevin Westmore, Tyson Fountaine, Ron Pipes (Nickelodeon); Muppets Haunted Mansion – Lisa Davis, Rebecca Graves, Donna May, Sean Smith, Renee Vaca, Elle Favorule, Sonia Cabrera (Disney+); Odd Squad – Christine Toye, Erica Croft, Jessica Panetta, Rhonda Stone, Samantha Couture, Katie Minnis (PBS); Sweet Tooth – Justin Raleigh (Netflix)

=== Writing ===
Writing
Outstanding Writing for a Preschool or Children's Program: The Baby-Sitters Club – Lisha Brooks, Rheeqrheeq Chainey, Ryan O'Connell, Dan Robert, Sascha Rothchild, Rachel Shukert (Netflix); See Us Coming Together: A Sesame Street Special – Ken Scarborough, Liz Hara (HBO Max); Sesame Street – Ken Scarborough, Harron Atkins, Molly Boylan, Laura Canty-Samuel, Jennifer Capra, Jessica Carleton, Geri Cole, Joseph Fallon, Christine Ferraro, Michael Goldberg, Monique D. Hall, Liz Hara, Ron Holsey, Raye Lankford, Wendy Marston, Tim McKeon, Andrew Moriarty, Luis Santeiro, Pilot Viruet, Morgan von Ancken, Belinda Ward, Autumn Zitani, Moujan Zolfaghari (HBO Max); Waffles + Mochi – Ann Austen, Shaun Diston, Cirocco Dunlap, Jeremy Konner, Lyric Lewis, David Radcliff (Netflix); Who Are You, Charlie Brown? – Michael Bonfiglio, Marcella Steingart (Apple TV+)	Outstanding Writing for a Young Teen Program: Heartstopper – Alice Oseman (Netflix); Better Nate Than Ever – Tim Federle (Disney+); Doogie Kameāloha, M.D. – Kourtney Kang (Disney+); The Mysterious Benedict Society – Phil Hay, Matt Manfredi (Disney+); Sweet Tooth – Justin Boyd, Noah Griffith, Christina Ham, Haley Harris, Jim Mickle, Michael R. Perry, Beth Schwartz, Daniel Stewart (Netflix)
Outstanding Writing for a Preschool Animated Program: Muppet Babies – Max Beaudry, Robyn Brown, Hanah Lee Cook, Sarah Eisenberg, Ghia Godfree, Francisco Paredes, Becky Wangberg (Disney Junior); Ada Twist, Scientist – Chris Nee, Kerri Grant, Ivory Floyd, Jennifer Hamburg, Lisa Kettle, Gabrielle Meyer, Robert Vargas, Aydrea Walden (Netflix); Alma's Way – Jorge Aguirre, Ami Boghani, Ernie Bustamante, Rosemary Contreras, Isabel Galupo, Ashley Griffis, Monique D. Hall, Melinda LaRose, Kris Marvin Hughes, Paul Moncrieffe, Miklos Perlus, Utkarsh Rajawat, Michael Rodriguez, Sheila Rogerson, Rodney Stringfellow, Bernice Vanderlaan, Dana Chan (PBS); Daniel Tiger's Neighborhood – Angela C. Santomero, Jill Cozza-Turner, Becky Friedman, Stacey Greenberger, Monique D. Hall, Jennifer Hamburg, Mary Jacobson, Melinda LaRose, Alyson Piekarsky, Alexandra Cassel Schwartz (PBS); Molly of Denali – Peter Hirsch, Princess Daazhraii Johnson, Aaluk Edwardson, Peter Ferland, Anna Hoover, Frank Henry Kaash Katasse, Elana Lesser, Cliff Ruby, Vera Starbard, June Thiele, X̱’unei Lance Twitchell, Kathy Waugh, Wáats'Asdíyei (Joe) Yates (PBS)	Outstanding Writing for an Animated Program: Maya and the Three – Jeff Ranjo, Tim Yoon, Jorge Gutierrez, Candie Langdale, Doug Langdale, Silvia Olivas (Netflix); Amphibia – Matt Braly, Michele Cavin, Adam Colás, Jack Ferraiolo, Todd McClintock, Jenava Mie, Gloria Shen (Disney Channel); City of Ghosts – Ako Castuera, Luis Grane, Elizabeth Ito, Bob Logan, Joanne Shen, Pendleton Ward (Netflix); Dug Days – Bob Peterson (Disney+); Karma's World – Halcyon Person, Erica Eastrich, Lakna Edilima, Kerri Grant, Kellie R. Grffin, Emma Kassirer, Jehan Madhani, Alison McDonald, Charity L. Miller, Alyson Piekarsky, Darnell Lamont Walker, Keion Jackson (Netflix)

=== Lifetime Achievement Award ===
- LeVar Burton

== Presenters and performers ==
The following presented awards and performing numbers:

Presenters
Name(s)	Role
December 10
JoJo Siwa	Outstanding Cinematography for a Live Action Single Camera Program; Outstanding Writing for a Live Action Preschool or Children's Program; Outstanding Costume Design/Styling; Outstanding Makeup and Hairstyling; Outstanding Original Song; Outstanding Editing for a Multiple Camera Program; Outstanding Cinematography for a Live Action Multiple Camera Program; Outstanding Directing for a Multiple Camera Program
Ben Giroux	Outstanding Main Title and Graphics; Outstanding Art Direction/Set Decoration/Scenic Design; Outstanding Promotional Announcement; Outstanding Interactive Media
Shaylee Mansfield; Jevon Whetter	Outstanding Editing for an Animated Program; Outstanding Writing for an Animated Program; Outstanding Casting for an Animated Program; Outstanding Voice Directing for an Animated Series
Donkey Hodie; Purple Panda	Outstanding Lighting Design for a Live Action Program; Outstanding Casting for a Live-Action Program; Outstanding Sound Mixing and Sound Editing for a Live Action Program; Outstanding Music Direction and Composition for a Live Action Program
Martin P. Robinson	Outstanding Editing for a Preschool Animated Program; Outstanding Writing for a Preschool Animated Program; Outstanding Directing for a Preschool Animated Program; Outstanding Directing for an Animated Program
Malia Baker; Sophie Grace	Outstanding Sound Mixing and Sound Editing for a Preschool Animated Program; Outstanding Editing for a Single Camera Program; Outstanding Music Direction and Composition for an Animated Program; Outstanding Sound Mixing and Sound Editing for an Animated Program
Kyla Pratt; John Salley	Outstanding Visual Effects for a Live Action Program; Outstanding Special Effects Costumes, Hair and Makeup; Outstanding Choreography; Outstanding Stunt Coordination
December 11
Tabitha Brown	Outstanding Younger Voice Performer in an Animated or Preschool Animated Program; Outstanding Voice Performance in a Preschool Animated Program; Outstanding Voice Performance in an Animated Program
William Gao; Joe Locke	Outstanding Non-Fiction Program; Outstanding Writing for a Young Teen Program; Outstanding Directing for a Single Camera Program; Outstanding Younger Performer in a Preschool, Children's or Young Teen Program
Grey DeLisle	Outstanding Host; Outstanding Guest Performance in a Preschool, Children's or Young Teen Program; Outstanding Supporting Performance in a Preschool, Children's or Young Teen Program; Outstanding Lead Performance in a Preschool, Children's or Young Teen Program
Laurence Fishburne	Presented the Lifetime Achievement Award to LeVar Burton
Eden Espinosa	Outstanding Preschool Series; Outstanding Young Teen Series; Outstanding Children's or Family Viewing Series
Sovereign Bill	Outstanding Special Class Animated Program
Jack McBrayer	Individual Achievement in Animation

Performers
Name(s)	Song(s)
December 10
XOMG POP!	"That's What I'm About"
December 11
Debbie Allen Dance Academy	N/A

== Shows with multiple nominations ==
Shows with four or more nominations
Nominations	Show	Network
11	The Mysterious Benedict Society	Disney+
11	Sneakerella	Disney+
10	Sesame Street	HBO Max/PBS Kids
9	Heartstopper	Netflix
9	Sweet Tooth	Netflix
8	The Baby-Sitters Club	Netflix
8	Better Nate Than Ever	Disney+
5	Raising Dion	Netflix
5	Waffles + Mochi	Netflix
5	High School Musical: The Musical: The Series	Disney+
5	Maya and the Three	Netflix
4	Who Are You, Charlie Brown	Apple TV+
4	Fraggle Rock: Back to the Rock	Apple TV+
4	Doogie Kameāloha, M.D.	Disney+
4	Muppets Haunted Mansion	Disney+
4	Octonauts	Netflix
4	Hilda and the Mountain King	Netflix
4	Ciao Alberto	Disney+
4	Go! Go! Cory Carson	Netflix
