= We the People (2021 TV series) =

American animated television series

- Promotional poster
- Created by: Chris Nee
- Directed by: Various
- Voices of: Various
- Theme music composer: Meshell Ndegeocello
- Country of origin: United States
- Original language: English
- No. of episodes: 10

Production
- Executive producers: Chris Nee; Kenya Barris; Barack Obama; Michelle Obama; Tonia Davis; Priya Swaminathan
- Producers: Ada Chiaghana; Erynn Sampson; PeeDee Shindell
- Running time: 4–5 minutes
- Production companies: Laughing Wild; Khalabo Ink Society; Higher Ground Productions; Netflix Animation Studios

Original release
- Network: Netflix
- Release: July 4, 2021

We the People is a 2021 American animated educational musical limited-run television series aiming to teach kids about civics. Each episode is a 4-5 minute animated music video by a popular performer. Created by Chris Nee, who executive produced it with Kenya Barris and Barack & Michelle Obama, the series premiered on July 4, 2021 on Netflix.

== Episodes ==
No.	Title	Directed by	Original release date
1	"Active Citizenship"	Peter Ramsey	July 4, 2021
A song about citizenship; performed by H.E.R.
2	"The Bill of Rights"	Trisha Gum	July 4, 2021
A song about the bill of rights; performed by Adam Lambert.
3	"Taxes"	Victoria Vincent	July 4, 2021
A song about taxes; performed by Cordae. Produced by Take a Daytrip.
4	"The Three Branches of Government"	Benjy Brooke	July 4, 2021
A song about the three branches of government: legislature, executive, and judiciary; performed by Kristen Anderson-Lopez, Daveed Diggs, Brittany Howard, Robert Lopez, and Lin-Manuel Miranda.
5	"The First Amendment"	Mabel Ye	July 4, 2021
A song about the First Amendment; performed by Brandi Carlile.
6	"Federal vs State Power"	Tim Rauch	July 4, 2021
A song about the differences in federal power and state power; performed by Kyle.
7	"Immigration"	Jorge Gutiérrez	July 4, 2021
A song about immigration; performed by Bebe Rexha.
8	"The Courts"	Daron Nefcy	July 4, 2021
A song about court cases; performed by Andra Day.
9	"We the People"	Everett Downing	July 4, 2021
A song performed by Janelle Monáe.
10	"The Miracles of Morning"	Kendra Ryan	July 4, 2021
A music video based around Amanda Gorman delivering her "The Hill We Climb" poem at the Inauguration of Joe Biden back in January 2021.

== Production ==
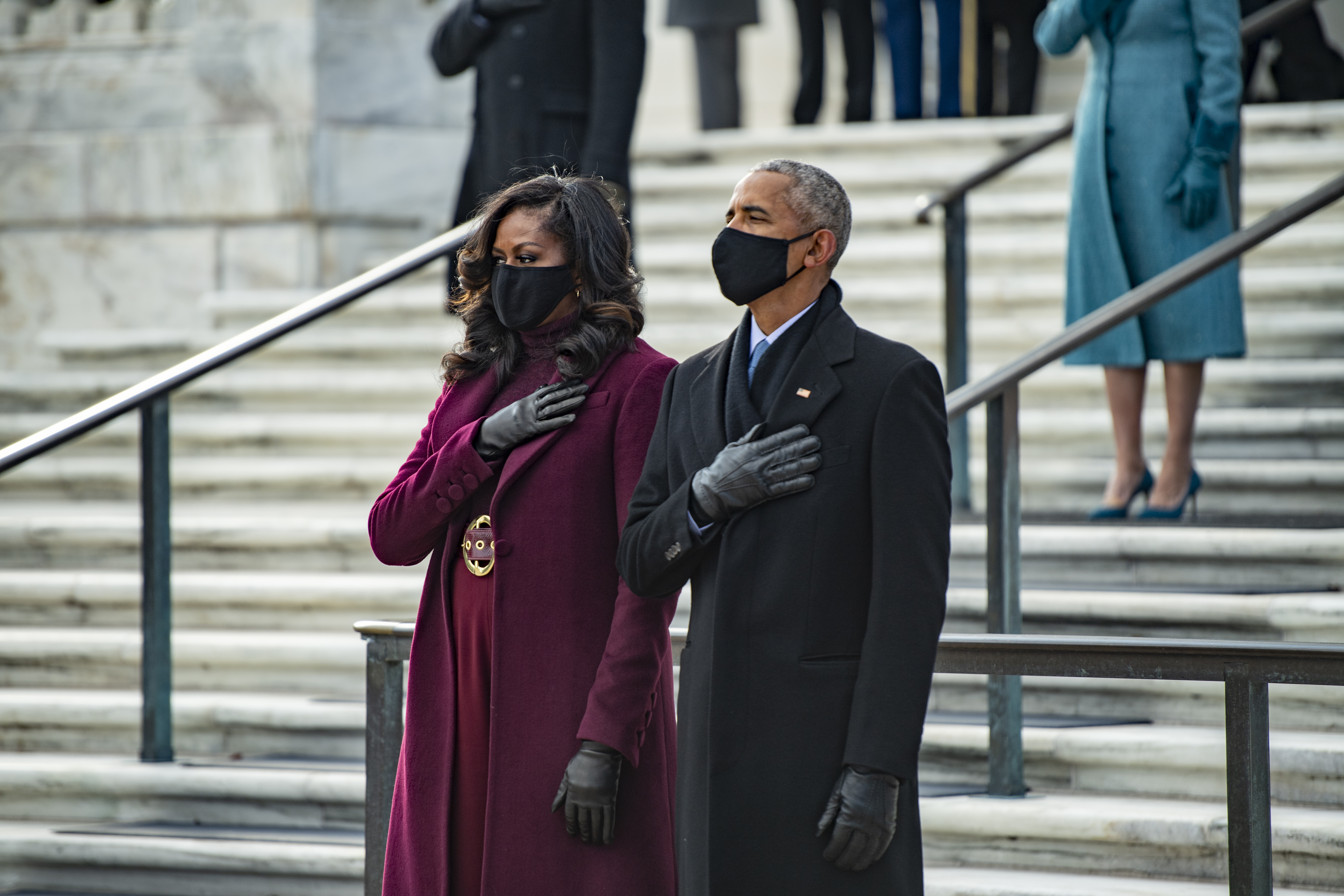
Michelle and Barack Obama in January 2021.

We the People was conceived by Chris Nee at a dinner party in Los Angeles, California in November 2018. Nee cites Schoolhouse Rock! as one of the most significant inspirations for the series. H.E.R. described working alongside the Obamas on the series as a "life-changing" experience.

== Release ==
We the People was released on Netflix on July 4, 2021.

== Reception ==
The series received a mixed reception. Caroline Framke of Variety described the series as "well-meaning", but "not especially illuminating in the way it would like to be". Ashley Moulton of Common Sense Media called the series "Modern Schoolhouse Rock" and argued it "makes great bops from U.S. civics." She also said that the videos are "generally non-partisan, but [that] some of the content leans slightly left" and called it a "superlative effort from a diverse group of talented creators."

The series was nominated for a GLAAD Media Award for Outstanding Children's Programming.

=== Accolades ===
Year	Award	Category	Nominee(s)	Result	Ref.
2021	Hollywood Music in Media Awards	Best Original Song in a TV Show/Limited Series	"Change" – H.E.R., Ronald Colson, Jeff Gitelman, David Harris, and Maxx Moore	Won	
2022	Annie Awards	Best Animated Television Production for Children	We the People (Episode: "Active Citizenship") – Laughing Wild, Higher Ground Productions, and Netflix	Nominated	
2022	Annie Awards	Outstanding Achievement for Character Animation in an Animated Television / Broadcast Production	We the People (Episode: "Active Citizenship") – Stephen Loveluck	Nominated	
2022	Children's and Family Emmy Awards	Outstanding Short Form Program	Kenya Barris, Antonio Canobbio, Nick Carmen, Tonia Davis, Ben Kalina, Joe Nash, Chris Nee, Barack Obama, Michelle Obama, Chris Prynoski, Shannon Prynoski, Emily Ricard, Priya Swaminathan, Justin Harris, Billy Mack, Ada Chiaghana, Will Feng, Jess Pierik, Erynn Sampson, Peedee Shindell, Tim Rauch, Benjy Brook, Everett Downing, Trisha Gum, Daron Nefcy, Jorge R. Gutierrez, Peter Ramsey, Kendra Ryan, Victoria Vincent, Mabel Ye, Kristen Anderson-Lopez, Andra Day, H.E.R., Denzel Michael-Akil Baptiste, Brandi Carlile, Ronald Colson, Cordae Dunston, Oak Felder, Jeff Gitelman, Amanda Gorman, Kay Hanley, David Harris, Kyle Harvey, Nathaniel Irvin, III, Scott Krippayne, Michelle Lewis, Robert Lopez, David Charles Marshall Biral, Lin-Manuel Miranda, Maxx Moore, Janelle Monáe Robinson, Daniel Petty, Michael "Smidi" Smith, and Tim van Berkestijn	Won	
2022	GLAAD Media Awards	Outstanding Children's Programming	We The People	Nominated	
2022	Guild of Music Supervisors Awards	Best Song Written and/or Recorded for Television	"Change" (Episode: "Active Citizenship") – Ronald Colson, Jeff Gitelman, David Harris, Maxx Moore, Gabriella Wilson, and Jen Ross	Nominated	
2022	NAACP Image Awards	Outstanding Animated Series	We the People	Won	
