= Children's and Family Emmy Award for Outstanding Writing for a Preschool or Children's Program =

Award for Outstanding Writing for a Preschool or Children's Program

- Awarded for: Outstanding Writing for a Preschool or Children's Program
- Country: United States
- Presented by: Academy of Television Arts & Sciences
- First award: 2022
- Currently held by: Sesame Street (2024)
- Website: theemmys.tv/childrens/

This is a list of winners and nominees of the Children's and Family Emmy Award for Outstanding Writing for a Preschool or Children's Program, which honors live action programs (series and TV movies) both in broadcast and streaming television aimed at viewers from infancy to age eleven. The category was established at the 1st Children's and Family Emmy Awards in 2022, and is a sister category to the Children's and Family Emmy Award for Outstanding Writing for a Young Teen Program, which honors shows aimed at older audiences, and one of the four categories honoring writing at the Children's and Family Emmy Awards.

The inaugural recipient of the award was Netflix series The Baby-Sitters Club. The current holder of the award is the HBO/Max series Sesame Street, which won at the 3rd Children's and Family Emmy Awards.

== Background ==
On November 17, 2021, the NATAS announced the creation of the Children's and Family Emmy Awards to recognize the best in children's and family television. The organization cited an "explosive growth in the quantity and quality of children’s and family programming" as justification for a dedicated ceremony. Many categories of the awards were previously presented at the Daytime Emmy Awards. Writing was originally honored there with the Daytime Emmy Award for Outstanding Writing for a Children's Series, which was presented from 1985 to 2020.

== Winners and nominations ==
=== 2020s ===
| Year | Series | Writer/s | Network | Ref |
|---|---|---|---|---|
2022 (1st)
| 2022 (1st) | The Baby-Sitters Club | Lisha Brooks, Rheeqrheeq Chainey, Ryan O'Connell, Dan Robert, Sascha Rothchild, Rachel Shukert | Netflix | |
| 2022 (1st) | See Us Coming Together: A Sesame Street Special | Ken Scarborough, Liz Hara | HBO/Max | |
| 2022 (1st) | Sesame Street | Ken Scarborough, Harron Atkins, Molly Boylan, Laura Canty-Samuel, Jennifer Capra, Jessica Carleton, Geri Cole, Joseph Fallon, Christine Ferraro, Michael Goldberg, Monique D. Hall, Liz Hara, Ron Holsey, Raye Lankford, Wendy Marston, Tim McKeon, Andrew Moriarty, Luis Santeiro, Pilot Viruet, Morgan von Ancken, Belinda Ward, Autumn Zitani, Moujan Zolfaghari | HBO/Max | |
| 2022 (1st) | Waffles + Mochi | Ann Austen, Shaun Diston, Cirocco Dunlap, Jeremy Konner, Lyric Lewis, David Radcliff | Netflix | |
| 2022 (1st) | Who Are You, Charlie Brown? | Michael Bonfiglio, Marcella Steingart | Apple TV+ | |
2023 (2nd)
| 2023 (2nd) | Sesame Street | Ken Scarborough, Belinda Arredondo, Molly Boylan, Jessica Carleton, Geri Cole, Joe Fallon, Christine Ferraro, Monique D. Hall, Liz Hara, Ron Holsey, Raye Lankford | HBO/Max | |
| 2023 (2nd) | Helpsters | Adam Peltzman, Marty Johnson, Tim McKeon, Roxy Simons, Eric Toth, Moujan Zolfaghari | Apple TV+ | |
| 2023 (2nd) | Jane | J.J. Johnson, Christin Simms, Tiffany Hsiung | Apple TV+ | |
| 2023 (2nd) | Lost Ollie | Shannon Tindle, Joanna Calo, Marc Haimes, Kate Gersten | Netflix | |
| 2023 (2nd) | Raven's Home | Jed Elinoff, Robin Henry, Anthony C. Hill, Scott Thomas, Rick Williams, Molly Haldeman, Jim Martin, Brittany Assaly, Danielle Calvert, Jai Joseph, Nori Reid, Jordan Mitchell | Disney Channel | |
2024 (3rd)
| 2024 (3rd) | Sesame Street: "Can They Be Friends?" | Andrew Moriarty, Katherine Sandford, Ken Scarborough | HBO/Max | |
| 2024 (3rd) | A Real Bug's Life: "The Big City" | Sean Abley, Tom Hugh Jones | National Geographic | |
| 2024 (3rd) | Sesame Street: "Brave Bessie by Brave Gabrielle" | Monique D. Hall, Ken Scarborough | HBO/Max | |
| 2024 (3rd) | Fraggle Rock: Back to the Rock: "I'm Pogey" | Charley Feldman, Maurin Mwombela, Douglas Lyons | Apple TV+ | |
| 2024 (3rd) | Fraggle Rock: Back to the Rock: "This For That" | Maurin Mwombela, Jocelyn Stevenson, Charley Feldman, Douglas Lyons | Apple TV+ | |
2025 (4th)
| 2025 (4th) | Tab Time: "When We Lose Someone" | Sean Presan, Steven Borzachillo, Nnamdi Ngwe, David F. M. Vaughn, Maggie Gottlieb, Sindy Spackman | YouTube | |
| 2025 (4th) | A Real Bug's Life: "Love in the Forest" | John Capener and Euan McDonald Smith | National Geographic | |
| 2025 (4th) | Jane: "Pan troglodytes" | Tiffany Hsiung and J.J. Johnson | Apple TV+ | |
| 2025 (4th) | Ms. Rachel: "Potty Training with Ms. Rachel" | Aron Accurso and Rachel Accurso | YouTube | |
| 2025 (4th) | Odd Squad: "Odd Ones In" | Mark de Angelis | PBS Kids | |
| 2025 (4th) | Secrets at Red Rocks: "People We Care About" | Martha Hardy-Ward | BYUtv | |
