= Children's and Family Emmy Award for Outstanding Writing for a Young Teen Program =

Award for Outstanding Writing for a Young Teen Program

- Awarded for: Outstanding Writing for a Young Teen Program
- Country: United States
- Presented by: Academy of Television Arts & Sciences
- First award: 2022
- Currently held by: Heartstopper (2025)
- Website: theemmys.tv/childrens/

This is a list of winners and nominees of the Children's and Family Emmy Award for Outstanding Writing for a Young Teen Program, which honors live action programs (series and TV movies) both in broadcast and streaming television aimed at viewers from age eleven to fifteen. The category was established at the 1st Children's and Family Emmy Awards in 2022, and is a sister category to the Children's and Family Emmy Award for Outstanding Writing for a Preschool or Children's Program, which honors shows aimed at younger audiences, and one of the four categories honoring writing at the Children's and Family Emmy Awards.

The inaugural recipient of the award was Netflix series Heartstopper. Which is also the current holder of the award, which won at the 4th Children's and Family Emmy Awards.

== Background ==
On November 17, 2021, the NATAS announced the creation of the Children's and Family Emmy Awards to recognize the best in children's and family television. The organization cited an "explosive growth in the quantity and quality of children’s and family programming" as justification for a dedicated ceremony. Many categories of the awards were previously presented at the Daytime Emmy Awards. Writing was originally honored there with the Daytime Emmy Award for Outstanding Writing for a Children's Series, which was presented from 1985 to 2020.

== Winners and nominations ==
=== 2020s ===
Year	Series	Writer/s	Network	Ref
2022 (1st)
2022 (1st)	Heartstopper	Alice Oseman	Netflix	
2022 (1st)	Better Nate Than Ever	Tim Federle	Disney+	
2022 (1st)	Doogie Kameāloha, M.D.	Kourtney Kang	Disney+	
2022 (1st)	The Mysterious Benedict Society	Phil Hay, Matt Manfredi	Disney+	
2022 (1st)	Sweet Tooth	Justin Boyd, Noah Griffith, Christina Ham, Haley Harris, Jim Mickle, Michael R. Perry, Beth Schwartz, Daniel Stewart	Netflix	
2023 (2nd)
2023 (2nd)	Life By Ella	Jeff Hodsden, Tim Pollock, Vincent Brown, Susan Jaffee, Natalie McKearnin, Hernan Barangan, Alyssa DiMar	Apple TV+	
2023 (2nd)	Chang Can Dunk	Jingyi Shao	Disney+	
2023 (2nd)	The Crossover	Kwame Alexander, Damani Johnson, Valerie C. Woods, Ali Kinney, Aaron Carter, Jasmine Swift, Jake Lawler	Disney+	
2023 (2nd)	Growing Up	Travis Callahan, Nicole Galovski	Disney+	
2023 (2nd)	The Mysterious Benedict Society	Taylor Chukwu, Phil Hay, Heather Jeng Bladt, Matt Manfredi, Angeli Millan, James Rogers III, Todd Slavkin, Darren Swimmer	Disney+	
2024 (3rd)
2024 (3rd)	Percy Jackson and the Olympians: "I Accidentally Vaporize My Pre-Algebra Teacher"	Rick Riordan, Jonathan E. Steinberg	Disney+	
2024 (3rd)	High School Musical: The Musical: The Series: "Admissions"	Nneka Gerstle	Disney+	
2024 (3rd)	The Spiderwick Chronicles: "The Field Guide to Jared Grace"	Aron Eli Coleite	The Roku Channel	
2024 (3rd)	Heartstopper: "Perfect"	Alice Oseman	Netflix	
2024 (3rd)	Goosebumps: "Say Cheese and Die!"	Rob Letterman, Nicholas Stoller	Disney+	
2025 (4th)
2025 (4th)	Heartstopper: "Journey"	Alice Oseman	Netflix	
2025 (4th)	Goosebumps: The Vanishing: "Stay Out of the Basement, Part I"	Rob Letterman, Hilary Winston	Disney+	
2025 (4th)	Me: "Pilot"	Barry L. Levy	Apple TV+	
2025 (4th)	Star Wars: Skeleton Crew: "This Could Be a Real Adventure"	Christopher Ford, Jon Watts	Disney+	
2025 (4th)	Sweet Tooth: "This Is a Story"	Jim Mickle	Netflix	
2025 (4th)	Time Bandits: "Kevin Haddock"	Jemaine Clement, Iain Morris, Taika Waititi	Apple TV+	
