= City of Ghosts (TV series) =

2021 television series

- Promotional poster
- Genre: Fantasy; Comedy; Mockumentary
- Created by: Elizabeth Ito
- Voices of: Blue Chapman; Kirikou S'hai Muldrow; August Nuñez; Michael Ren; Angel Chipagua
- Composer: Michael Andrews
- Countries of origin: United States; France
- Original language: English
- No. of episodes: 6

Production
- Executive producers: Elizabeth Ito; Melissa Cobb
- Editor: Hugo Morales
- Running time: 18–20 minutes
- Production companies: Kikutowne; TeamTO; Netflix Animation Studios

Original release
- Network: Netflix
- Release: March 5, 2021

City of Ghosts is a animated mockumentary television series created by Elizabeth Ito for Netflix. Co-produced by TeamTO and Netflix Animation, the series premiered on March 5, 2021.

In 2022, the series won a Peabody Award for Children & Youth Programming. Episode 4 of the show references the Tongva homelands of Tovaangar.

== Premise ==
A group of kids, in this hybrid animated mockumentary series, discover stories around Los Angeles by directly communicating with ghosts who inhabit the city.

== Characters ==
=== Ghost Club ===
- Zelda (voiced by August Nuñez), a young child and lead detective of the Ghost Club.
- Thomas (voiced by Blue Chapman), a 7-year-old non-binary child who uses they/them pronouns, and member of the Ghost Club. Thomas mentions their pronouns briefly at the beginning of the second episode.
- Eva (voiced by Kirikou S'hai Muldrow), a 5-year-old child and member of the Ghost Club.
- Peter (voiced by Michael Ren), a 6-year-old child and member of the Ghost Club with Eva, Zelda, and Thomas.
- Jasper (voiced by Honor Calderon), a 7-year-old child and member of the Ghost Club with Eva, Zelda, Thomas and Peter. His first appearance is in episode four "Tovangaar", where he is a child who asks the Ghost Club for help and reconnects to his Tongva roots.

=== Supporting characters ===
- Chef Jo (voiced by Isa Fabro), a Filipina chef who owns a vegan café in Boyle Heights.
- Mariko (voiced by Kuniko Yagi), friend of Chef Jo who contacts Zelda and asks them for help in tracking down a ghost in the café.
- Jordan (voiced by Angel Chipagua) is Zelda's brother and operates a hand-held camera which records the Ghost Club's activities.
- Janet (voiced by Judy Hayashi), a ghost living in Jo's café.
- Sam (voiced by Teagan Meza), an eight-year-old skateboarder who is spending time with a ghost.
- John "JP" P. (voiced by John Pham), the owner of a skate shop in Venice, California, and a friend of Sam.
- Sonya (voiced by Tomeicko Hawkins), owns a vegan café in Leimert Park.
- Jasper (voiced by Honor Calderon), a child who asks the Ghost Club for help and reconnects to his Tongva roots.
- Zelda's Mom (voiced by Sandra Equihua) is the mother of Zelda.
- Nancy Sekizawa (voiced by herself) is a former punk rocker and mother of Zen.
- Yulissa (voiced by Yulissa Maqueos) is a teacher of Oaxacan music, looking for her friend Chepe who communicates with people by whistling.
- Colton (voiced by Gage Fensler)
- Josh "Bagel" Klassman (voiced by himself), a professional skater, surfer, and photographer.
- Aawkut (voiced by L. Frank Manrique) is a ghost in a form of a crow who appears in the episode "Tovaangar".
- Walter (voiced by Adam Muto)
- Lena (voiced by Gala Parras-Kim)

== Episodes ==
No.	Title	Directed by	Written by	Original release date
1	"The Sort of Japanese Restaurant"	Elizabeth Ito	Elizabeth Ito, Joanne Shen, Seo Kim, Ako Castuera & Jesse Flint	March 5, 2021
In Boyle Heights, a restaurant has a phantom come during the night, annoying the shop's owner. The Ghost Club comes to the scene to find out what is really going on.
2	"Venice"	Ako Castuera	Elizabeth Ito, Joanne Shen, Suzie Vlcek & Ako Castuera	March 5, 2021
In Venice Beach, the Ghost Club investigates the disappearance of a skater kid and talks with two spirits who were former skaters.
3	"Leimert Park"	Bob Logan	Elizabeth Ito, Joanne Shen, Suzie Vlcek & Bob Logan	March 5, 2021
The Ghost Club is called to investigate after a cafre experiences drumming which continues through the night.
4	"Tovaangar"	Ako Castuera	Elizabeth Ito, Suzie Vlcek, Ako Castuera & Joanne Shen	March 5, 2021
Jasper contacts the Ghost Club and they help him connect with his long-lost ancestors.
5	"Bob & Nancy"	Elizabeth Ito & Pendleton Ward	Elizabeth Ito, Joanne Shen, Suzie Vlcek & Pendleton Ward	March 5, 2021
Assisting a marionette theater, the Ghost Club is able to stop a daughter and her mother (a ghost) from fighting each other.
6	"Koreatown"	Luis Grane, Elizabeth Ito & Ako Castuera	Elizabeth Ito, Joanne Shen, Suzie Vlcek, Luis Grane & Ako Castuera	March 5, 2021
A music teacher comes to the Ghost Club, asking for help in finding her missing friend, which is a ghost.

== Production ==
The series was announced by Netflix in May 2019, with Adventure Time writer Elizabeth Ito as showrunner.

The show's backgrounds come from photographs taken by Kwasi Boyd-Bouldin, then painted over at the Los Angeles studio of Chromosphere Studio and the character animation is by the French company, TeamTO. The animation supervisor of TeamTo, Mariah Luna, said that they talked with Ito and Luis Grane, supervising director, of the show, informing their animation. The production manager, Jaimy Nikijuluw, adding that they were often in contact with Ito and Grane until the end of production of each episode. Guillaume Hellouin, president/co-founder of TeamTO said that only a small team worked on the show, one of the smallest they've "ever worked with" while Nikijuluw added they had weekly calls with those at Netflix and Chromosphere Studio.

== Release ==
The series was released on March 5, 2021, on Netflix. A trailer was released on February 4. Selections from the series were presented at the San Francisco International Film Festival's Schools at the Festival program in April 2021.

== Reception ==
The series was positively received. Mashable called the show a "warm, sunny, and soft" and praised the show's pacing, wittiness, humor, and the voice cast. They also said it makes topics like discrimination, cultural appropriation, gentrification and historical erasure understandable for those at a young age. Vulture praised the series as a "lovely and refreshing vision for children’s entertainment" that adults can enjoy which is crafted like a nonfiction production. Wired described the series as "full of big emotional wallops and...narrative specificity" and called it delightful, arguing that it proposes a new way of thinking "about cities, ethnicity, and history," geared toward kids. Wired also called the show a "multicultural melange." The Capital Times called the show "warm and huggable" and for all ages. Los Angeles Times called the series a "gentle love letter" to Los Angeles and the diverse communities within the city, accessible to kids and adults. Animation World Network praised the animation style and background, saying the latter has "the aesthetic of a pop-up book." The New York Times recommended the series to fans of Bluey, Molly of Denali, NPR podcasts and Vida.

The series got nominated for 3 Children's and Family Emmy Awards including Outstanding Animated Series at the 1st Children's and Family Emmy Awards and won 2 awards for Outstanding Directing for an Animated Program and Outstanding Animated Series.
