= Victoria Vincent =

American animator and film director

- Born: Los Angeles, California, U.S.
- Occupations: Animator; Film director; YouTuber

YouTube information
- Channel: vewn
- Genre: Animation
- Subscribers: 1.58 million
- Views: 96.6 million
- Last updated: August 12, 2026
- Website: vewn.us

Victoria Vincent, known online as Vewn, is an American animator and film director. Inspired by anime and editing YouTube clips of RuneScape, her stories reflect her own life experiences. Her works often focuses on the "disillusionment and anxiety of characters living in distorted, unstable worlds". Lately, she has sought to represent the overstimulation of our modern day media landscape.

Vincent has worked as director on the Netflix animated series We the People, and after participating in Bento Box Entertainment’s SkunkWorks program she was set to work as the writer and executive producer for Fox's animation Dirt Girls. This project was later cancelled.

Titled "World of Vewn: Animation Retrospective and Live Q&A," her first retrospective animation showcase and Q&A took place at the Denizen Theatre at New Paltz, New York.

== Filmography ==
- Lifewasters (2025)
- Snooze Quest (2025, short film for Adult Swim Smalls)
- Uncomfortable Encounter (2024)
- Health (2024)
- How to make an animated video (tutorial) (2024)
- Stupid Dinner (2023)
- Nothing to Hide (Bad Kid Stuff) (2023)
- Fired (2023)
- Stilton's in Charge 2 (2023, co-directed with Jonni Peppers)
- Catopolis (2022)
- Birthday (Bad Kid Stuff) (2022)
- Bobo the Monkey (2021, short film for Adult Swim Smalls)
- We the People (2021, directed episode 3)
- A Dog that Smokes Weed (2020, co-directed with Jonni Peppers)
- Twins in Paradise (2020)
- Catscape (2019)
- Dead End. (2019)
- Mask Dog (2018, short film for Adult Swim)
- Bunnyrabbit (2018)
- motivational video movie (2018)
- floatland (2018)
- kittykat96 (2017)
- Cat City (2017)
- agoraphobia (2017)
- Little Bunny (2016)
- Fluffy's third Eye (2016)
- find true love (2016)
- pizza movie (2016)
- Stilton's in Charge (2016, co-directed with Jonni Peppers)
- They're Gonna Fight (2015, co-directed with Jonni Peppers and Aster Pang)
