= Kay Wilson Stallings =

American television executive and producer

- Born: Brooklyn, New York, U.S.
- Education: MacMurray College; University of Illinois
- Occupation: Television producer

Kay Wilson Stallings is an American television executive and producer. She worked at Nickelodeon as a network executive from 1999 until March 2015, when she left the company due to a wave of senior employee layoffs. In August 2015, Stallings was hired by Sesame Workshop. In 2020, she was promoted to Sesame Workshop's head of creative development.

In her role as Nickelodeon's senior vice president (SVP) of production and development, Stallings oversaw the development of all original series for Nickelodeon Preschool and the Nick Jr. Channel. Stallings developed more than 20 shows during her tenure, including Wonder Pets!, The Fresh Beat Band, Shimmer and Shine, Sunny Day, Blaze and the Monster Machines, and Nickelodeon's revival of Winx Club. She was also the executive-in-charge of Winx Club and The Backyardigans.
