= Rhymes Through Times =

Emmy-nominated animated children's series

- Created by: Lasette Canady
- Directed by: Saxton Moore
- Voices of: Various
- Music by: Christopher Jackson
- Country of origin: United States
- Original language: English
- No. of episodes: 7

Production
- Executive producers: Lasette Canady; Christopher Jackson; Marc Cantone; Julius Harper
- Running time: 2-3 minutes
- Production companies: Noggin; Nick Jr. Lion Forge Animation

Original release
- Network: Nickelodeon
- Release: February 15, 2021 – July 1, 2022

Rhymes Through Times is an American animated musical series created by Lasette Canady, featuring music performed by Christopher Jackson, and animation by Lion Forge. The series first premiered on the Noggin app and on the Nick Jr. Youtube channel. Music from the series was released as an album across music streaming platforms.

The series debuted on February 15, 2021, and is currently in its first season with 7 episodes already released. Each episode of Rhymes Through Times celebrates Black culture by highlighting the stories and experiences of Black historical figures. Set as a stage play, beloved Nick Jr. characters (Bubble Guppies, Blaze and the Monster Machines, Nella the Princess Knight, and Butterbean's Café) dress up to portray iconic figures such as Amanda Gorman, Ruby Bridges, Thurgood Marshall, Katherine Johnson, Alvin Ailey, Aretha Franklin, and more.

== Reception ==
The 7-episode social good series was reviewed by Dr. Beverly Tatum, an advisor in anti-bias education. It was given 4 out of 5 stars by Common Sense Media. And In 2021 Rhymes Through Times received a Cynopsis Model D award for Best New Web Series. In 2022 it was nominated for a Kidscreen Award for Best Web/App Series. And on November 1, 2022 it was announced that Rhymes Through Times was nominated for an Emmy award for outstanding short-form program, in the first-ever Children's and Family Emmys.

== Songs and episodes ==
| No. | Title | Description | Release date |
|---|---|---|---|
| 1 | Hero | A song about American activist, Ruby Bridges and Supreme Court Justice, Thurgood Marshall | February 15, 2021 |
| 2 | My Best | A song about mathematician Katherine Johnson and astronaut, Guion Stewart Bluford Jr. | February 24, 2021 |
| 3 | Why We Dance | A song about American dancers, Katherine Dunham and Alvin Ailey | March 5, 2021 |
| 4 | Sing our Song | A song about American singer, Aretha Franklin | June 16, 2022 |
| 5 | Power in a Word | A song about American poet, Amanda Gorman | June 22, 2022 |
| 6 | Confidence | A song about American baseball player, Satchel Paige | June 25, 2022 |
| 7 | Creativity | A song about American inventor, Lewis Latimer | July 1, 2022 |

== Accolades ==
| Year | Award | Category | Result |
|---|---|---|---|
| 2021 | Cynopsis Model D Awards | Best New Web Series | Winner |
| 2021 | Kidscreen Awards | Best Web/App Series | Nominated |
| 2022 | Children's & Family Emmy Awards | Outstanding Short-Form Program | Nominated |
