= Children's and Family Emmy Awards =

American TV award

Children's and Family Emmy Award
- Current: 4th Children's and Family Emmy Awards
- Awarded for: Excellence in children's and family television
- Country: United States
- Presented by: National Academy of Television Arts and Sciences
- Website: theemmys.tv/childrens/

The Children's and Family Emmy Awards, or Children's and Family Emmys, are a part of the extensive range of Emmy Awards for artistic and technical merit for the American television industry. Bestowed by the National Academy of Television Arts and Sciences (NATAS), the Children's and Family Emmys are presented in recognition of excellence in American children's and family-oriented television programming. The first ceremony took place on December 10 and 11, 2022, at Wilshire Ebell Theatre, Los Angeles. Awards for children's programming are offshoots of categories that were previously presented at both the Daytime Emmys and the Primetime Emmys.

== History ==
Previously, the majority of Emmy Awards for children's television fell within the scope of the Daytime Emmy Awards, as presented by National Academy of Television Arts and Sciences. Until 2020, the Primetime Emmy Awards had also featured a non-competitive award for Outstanding Children's Program; when announcing its discontinuation, the Academy of Television Arts & Sciences (ATAS) cited that the proliferation of streaming services had created confusion over whether children's programs should fall under the Daytime or Primetime awards. Its criteria had already been modified to make primetime specials and spin-offs of a daytime children's program ineligible.

On November 17, 2021, the NATAS announced that it would create a new award presentation for children's and family television in 2022, the Children's and Family Emmy Awards. The organization cited an "explosive growth in the quantity and quality of children's and family programming" as justification for a dedicated ceremony. The ceremony was established as part of a larger re-alignment of the categories and eligibility criteria for the Primetime and Daytime Emmy Awards which began in 2022, with eligibility for the ceremonies now based on themes and stylistic characteristics rather than strictly the dayparts where a program airs on linear television.

In December 2023, NATAS president Adam Sharp stated that beginning with the third ceremony, the Children's and Family Emmy Awards would move from its previous December scheduling to a date later in awards season; Sharp cited feedback from industry members who wished for the ceremony to be held following the holiday season. The third-annual ceremony would be scheduled for March 15, 2025.

== Categories ==
The following categories were presented at the 4th Children's and Family Emmy Awards:

=== Program ===
- Outstanding Preschool, Children's or Family Viewing Series
- Outstanding Young Teen Series
- Outstanding Fiction Special
- Outstanding Preschool Animated Series
- Outstanding Children's or Young Teen Animated Series
- Outstanding Animated Special
- Outstanding Live Action Short Form Program
- Outstanding Animated Short Form Program
- Outstanding Informational Program

=== Performer ===
- Outstanding Lead Performer
- Outstanding Supporting Performer
- Outstanding Younger Performer
- Outstanding Voice Performer in a Preschool Animated Program
- Outstanding Voice Performer in a Children's or Young Teen Program
- Outstanding Younger Voice Performer in an Animated or Preschool Animated Program
- Outstanding Children's Personality
- Outstanding Puppeteer Performer

=== Writing ===
- Outstanding Writing for a Preschool or Children's Program
- Outstanding Writing for a Young Teen Program
- Outstanding Writing for a Preschool Animated Program
- Outstanding Writing for an Animated Program
- Outstanding Writing for a Children's or Young Teen Animated Series

=== Directing ===
- Outstanding Directing for a Single Camera Program
- Outstanding Directing for a Multiple Camera Program
- Outstanding Directing for a Preschool Animated Program
- Outstanding Directing for an Animated Program
- Outstanding Voice Directing for an Animated Series

=== Crafts ===
- Outstanding Music Direction and Composition for a Live Action Program
- Outstanding Music Direction and Composition for an Animated Program
- Outstanding Original Song for a Preschool Program
- Outstanding Original Song for a Children's and Young Teen Program
- Outstanding Lighting Design for a Live Action Program
- Outstanding Cinematography for a Live Action Single-Camera Program
- Outstanding Cinematography for a Live Action Multiple-Camera Program
- Outstanding Editing for a Single Camera Program
- Outstanding Editing for Multiple Camera Program
- Outstanding Editing for a Preschool Animated Program
- Outstanding Editing for an Animated Program
- Outstanding Sound Mixing and Sound Editing for a Live Action Program
- Outstanding Sound Mixing and Sound Editing for a Preschool Animated Program
- Outstanding Sound Editing and Sound Mixing for an Animated Program
- Outstanding Visual Effects for a Live Action Program
- Outstanding Show Open
- Outstanding Casting for a Live-Action Program
- Outstanding Casting for an Animated Program
- Outstanding Art Direction/Set Decoration/Scenic Design
- Outstanding Costume Design/Styling
- Outstanding Hairstyling and Makeup
- Outstanding Stunt Coordination for a Live Action Program
- Outstanding Public Service Initiative
- Outstanding Puppet Design/Styling

=== Individual Achievement ===
- Individual Achievement in Animation

=== Special ===
- Lifetime Achievement Award

=== Defunct categories ===
- Outstanding Choreography (2022-2025)
- Outstanding Guest Performance (presented in 2022 only)
- Outstanding Multiple Voice Role Performer (split into two categories in 2025) (presented in 2025 only)
- Outstanding Single Voice Role Performer (split into two categories in 2025) (presented in 2025 only)
- Outstanding Original Song (split into two categories in 2023)
- Outstanding Special Effects Costumes, Makeup and Hairstyling (presented in 2022 only)
- Outstanding Short Form Program (split into two categories in 2024)
- Outstanding Promotional Announcement (presented in 2022 and 2023)
- Outstanding Interactive Media
- Outstanding Preschool Series (2022-2025, merged with Children's and Family Series)

== List of ceremonies ==
#	Date	Eligibility Years	Host(s)	Location
1st	December 10–11, 2022	2021–22	JoJo Siwa (December 10); Jack McBrayer (December 11)	Wilshire Ebell Theatre, Los Angeles
2nd	December 16–17, 2023	2022–23	Christopher Jackson	Westin Bonaventure Hotel, Los Angeles
3rd	March 15, 2025	2023–24	Eric Bauza	Television City, Los Angeles
4th	March 1–2, 2026	2024–25	John Tartaglia	Jazz at Lincoln Center, New York
