= List of accolades received by Heartstopper =

Heartstopper awards and nominations
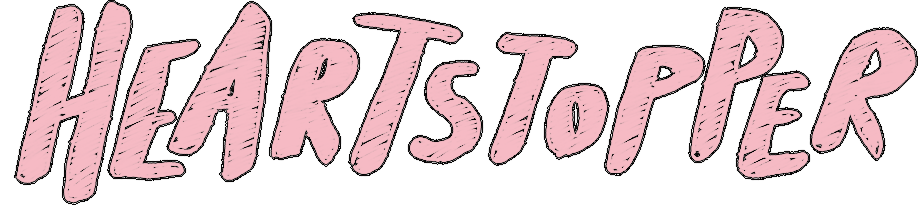
Awards and nominations
Award	Wins	Nominations
Attitude Awards	1	1
Australian Academy of Cinema and Television Arts Awards	0	1
BAFTA Cymru	1	1
British Academy Television Awards	0	1
British Academy Television Craft Awards	0	2
C21 International Drama Awards	0	2
Casting Directors' Guild Awards	1	1
Children's and Family Emmy Awards	7	17
Digital Spy Reader Awards	10	10
Dorian Awards	1	6
Edinburgh TV Awards	1	1
Gay Times Honours	1	1
GLAAD Media Awards	3	3
Golden Tomato Awards	1	1
Hollywood Music in Media Awards	0	1
Humanitas Prize	1	1
Kidscreen Awards	5	6
MTV Movie & TV Awards	1	1
Music+Sound Awards	1	1
National Television Awards	0	4
Queerties	6	6
Rose d'Or	1	3
Rolling Stone UK Awards	0	1
Royal Television Society Craft & Design Awards	1	1
Royal Television Society Programme Awards	1	1
Satellite Awards	0	1
Soho House Awards	1	1
Television Critics Association Awards	0	2
TV Choice Awards	1	4
Velma Awards	1	1
Visionary Arts Awards	0	1

Totals (Note: Certain award groups do not simply award one winner. They acknowledge several different recipients, have runners-up, and have third place. Since this is a specific recognition and is different from losing an award, runner-up mentions are considered wins in this award tally. For simplification and to avoid errors, each award in this list has been presumed to have had a prior nomination.)
- Wins: 47
- Nominations: 84

Heartstopper is a British coming-of-age romantic comedy-drama television series created and written by Alice Oseman for Netflix, based on her webcomic and graphic novel series of the same name. It follows teenagers Charlie Spring and Nick Nelson, played by Joe Locke and Kit Connor, whose friendship develops into a romantic relationship as they navigate school and young love. The series premiered on 22 April 2022, followed by a second series on 3 August 2023 and a third on 3 October 2024.

The series received critical acclaim (Note: Season-by-season reception: The first series holds a 100% approval rating based on 61 reviews on Rotten Tomatoes and a score of 85 based on 9 reviews on Metacritic.; The second series holds a 96% approval rating based on 57 reviews on Rotten Tomatoes and a score of 79 based on 20 reviews on Metacritic.; The third series holds a 100% approval rating based on 29 reviews on Rotten Tomatoes and a score of 80 based on 10 reviews on Metacritic.) and numerous accolades. Heartstopper has received 17 Children's and Family Emmy Awards nominations, winning seven, and has also won all three of its GLAAD Media Awards and two Royal Television Society Awards. Among individual recipients, Connor and Locke won Children's and Family Emmy Awards for lead performance, while Oseman won twice for writing.

== Awards and nominations ==
Awards and nominations received by Heartstopper
Award	Date of ceremony	Category	Recipient(s)	Result	Ref(s).
Attitude Awards	12 October 2022	TV Award	Heartstopper	Won	
Australian Academy of Cinema and Television Arts Awards	7 February 2025	Favourite TV Show	Heartstopper	Nominated	
BAFTA Cymru	20 October 2024	Director: Fiction	Euros Lyn for Heartstopper	Won	
British Academy Television Awards	14 May 2023	P&O Cruises Memorable Moment	Heartstopper – "Nick and Charlie's First Kiss"	Nominated	
British Academy Television Craft Awards	23 April 2023	Writer: Drama	Alice Oseman for Heartstopper	Nominated	
British Academy Television Craft Awards	28 April 2024	Original Music: Fiction	Adiescar Chase for Heartstopper	Nominated	
C21 International Drama Awards	1 December 2022	Best Comedy-Drama Series	Heartstopper	Nominated	
C21 International Drama Awards	30 November 2023	Returning Comedy-Drama Series	Heartstopper	Nominated	
Casting Directors' Guild Awards	22 February 2023	Best Casting in a Television Drama Series	Daniel Edwards, Lucy Allen, Tom Payne, and Catherine Garlick for Heartstopper	Won	
Children's and Family Emmy Awards	10 December 2022	Outstanding Casting for a Live Action Program	Daniel Edwards	Won	
Children's and Family Emmy Awards	10 December 2022	Outstanding Makeup and Hairstyling	Diandra Ferreira, Sorcha Fisher, and Melanie Lindsay	Nominated	
Children's and Family Emmy Awards	11 December 2022	Outstanding Young Teen Series	Iain Canning, Hakan Kousetta, Jamie Laurenson, Euros Lyn, Alice Oseman, Emile Sherman, Patrick Walters, Simon Gillis, Zorana Piggott, and Dylan Rees	Won	
Children's and Family Emmy Awards	11 December 2022	Outstanding Lead Performance in a Preschool, Children's or Young Teen Program	Kit Connor as Nick Nelson	Won	
Children's and Family Emmy Awards	11 December 2022	Outstanding Lead Performance in a Preschool, Children's or Young Teen Program	Joe Locke as Charlie Spring	Nominated	
Children's and Family Emmy Awards	11 December 2022	Outstanding Supporting Performance in a Preschool, Children's or Young Teen Program	Yasmin Finney as Elle Argent	Nominated	
Children's and Family Emmy Awards	11 December 2022	Outstanding Supporting Performance in a Preschool, Children's or Young Teen Program	William Gao as Tao Xu	Nominated	
Children's and Family Emmy Awards	11 December 2022	Outstanding Guest Performance in a Preschool, Children's or Young Teen Program	Olivia Colman as Sarah Nelson	Won	
Children's and Family Emmy Awards	11 December 2022	Outstanding Writing for a Young Teen Program	Alice Oseman	Won	
Children's and Family Emmy Awards	15 March 2025	Outstanding Young Teen Series	Iain Canning, Euros Lyn, Alice Oseman, Emile Sherman, Patrick Walters, Simon Gillis, Zorana Piggott, Emma Biggins, and Xavier Roy	Nominated	
Children's and Family Emmy Awards	15 March 2025	Outstanding Writing for a Young Teen Series	Alice Oseman for "Perfect"	Nominated	
Children's and Family Emmy Awards	15 March 2025	Outstanding Casting for a Live Action Program	Daniel Edwards and Lucy Allen	Nominated	
Children's and Family Emmy Awards	2 March 2026	Outstanding Young Teen Series	Iain Canning, Euros Lyn, Alice Oseman, Emile Sherman, Patrick Walters, Simon Gillis, and Brett Thomas	Nominated	
Children's and Family Emmy Awards	2 March 2026	Outstanding Lead Performer in a Preschool, Children's or Young Teen Program	Kit Connor as Nick Nelson	Nominated	
Children's and Family Emmy Awards	2 March 2026	Outstanding Lead Performer in a Preschool, Children's or Young Teen Program	Joe Locke as Charlie Spring	Won	
Children's and Family Emmy Awards	2 March 2026	Outstanding Writing for a Young Teen Series	Alice Oseman for "Journey"	Won	
Children's and Family Emmy Awards	2 March 2026	Outstanding Directing for a Live Action Series	Andy Newbery for "Journey"	Nominated	
Digital Spy Reader Awards	25 December 2022	Rising Star	Kit Connor	Won	
Digital Spy Reader Awards	25 December 2022	Rising Star	Joe Locke	Runner-up	
Digital Spy Reader Awards	25 December 2022	Most Bingeable Show	Heartstopper	Won	
Digital Spy Reader Awards	25 December 2022	Best Moment	Heartstopper – "Nick and Charlie's first kiss"	Won	
Digital Spy Reader Awards	25 December 2022	Best Character	Nick Nelson	Won	
Digital Spy Reader Awards	25 December 2022	Best Character	Charlie Spring	Runner-up	
Digital Spy Reader Awards	25 December 2022	Breakthrough Hit	Heartstopper	Won	
Digital Spy Reader Awards	25 December 2022	Best Finale of 2022	Heartstopper	Won	
Digital Spy Reader Awards	26 December 2024	Best TV Show (scripted)	Heartstopper	Runner-up	
Digital Spy Reader Awards	26 December 2024	Best Actor	Kit Connor	Runner-up	
Dorian Awards	17 August 2022	Best TV Drama	Heartstopper	Nominated	
Dorian Awards	17 August 2022	Best LGBTQ TV Show	Heartstopper	Won	
Dorian Awards	17 August 2022	Best TV Performance	Kit Connor	Nominated	
Dorian Awards	12 August 2024	Best TV Drama	Heartstopper	Nominated	
Dorian Awards	12 August 2024	Best LGBTQ TV Show	Heartstopper	Nominated	
Dorian Awards	8 July 2025	Best LGBTQ TV Show	Heartstopper	Nominated	
Edinburgh TV Awards	25 August 2022	TV Moment of the Year	Heartstopper – "Nick and Charlie's First Kiss"	Won	
Gay Times Honours	25 November 2022	On Screen Trailblazer	Cast of Heartstopper	Won	
GLAAD Media Awards	13 May 2023	Outstanding Kids & Family Programming or Film – Live Action	Heartstopper	Won	
GLAAD Media Awards	11 May 2024	Outstanding Kids & Family Programming or Film – Live Action	Heartstopper	Won	
GLAAD Media Awards	27 March 2025	Outstanding Kids & Family Programming or Film – Live Action	Heartstopper	Won	
Golden Tomato Awards	12 January 2023	Best Romance Series	Heartstopper series 1	Won	
Hollywood Music in Media Awards	16 November 2022	Song/Score - Trailer	Baby Queen for the Heartstopper trailer – "Colours of You"	Nominated	
Humanitas Prize	7 September 2025	Children's Teleplay	Alice Oseman for "Journey"	Won	
Kidscreen Awards	14 February 2023	Best New Series - Tweens/Teens	Heartstopper	Won	
Kidscreen Awards	14 February 2023	Best Live-Action Series - Tweens/Teens	Heartstopper	Won	
Kidscreen Awards	14 February 2023	Best Inclusivity - Tweens/Teens	Heartstopper	Nominated	
Kidscreen Awards	14 February 2023	Best in Class	Heartstopper	Won	
Kidscreen Awards	14 February 2023	Best Acting	Heartstopper	Won	
Kidscreen Awards	24 February 2026	Best Live-Action Series - Tweens/Teens	Heartstopper	Won	
MTV Movie & TV Awards	5 June 2022	Best Musical Moment	Heartstopper – "Dance With Me"	Won	
Music+Sound Awards	10 October 2024	Best Sync in a Television Programme	AWAL, Tyler Batchelor, Matt Biffa, Euros Lyn, and Wasia Project for Heartstopper series 2 – "ur so pretty"	Won	
National Television Awards	13 October 2022	New Drama	Heartstopper	Nominated	
National Television Awards	13 October 2022	Rising Star	Joe Locke	Nominated	
National Television Awards	13 October 2022	Rising Star	Kit Connor	Nominated	
National Television Awards	10 September 2025	Returning Drama	Heartstopper	Nominated	
Queerties	28 February 2023	TV Comedy	Heartstopper	Won	
Queerties	28 February 2023	Performance - TV	Joe Locke	Won	
Queerties	12 March 2024	TV Comedy	Heartstopper	Won	
Queerties	12 March 2024	TV Performance	Kit Connor	Won	
Queerties	11 March 2025	TV Comedy	Heartstopper	Won	
Queerties	11 March 2025	TV Performance	Yasmin Finney	Runner-up	
Rose d'Or	28 November 2022	Comedy Drama and Sitcom	Heartstopper	Nominated	
Rose d'Or	28 November 2022	Emerging Talent	Yasmin Finney	Won	
Rose d'Or	27 November 2023	Comedy Drama and Sitcom	Heartstopper	Nominated	
Rolling Stone UK Awards	23 November 2023	Television Award	Heartstopper	Nominated	
Royal Television Society Craft & Design Awards	5 December 2022	Casting Award	Daniel Edwards	Won	
Royal Television Society Programme Awards	28 March 2023	Leading Actor (Male)	Kit Connor	Won	
Satellite Awards	3 March 2023	Television Series, Drama	Heartstopper	Nominated	
Soho House Awards	1 September 2022	Breakthrough Actress	Yasmin Finney	Won	
Television Critics Association Awards	12 July 2024	Outstanding Achievement in Family Programming	Heartstopper	Nominated	
Television Critics Association Awards	20 August 2025	Outstanding Achievement in Family Programming	Heartstopper	Nominated	
TV Choice Awards	14 November 2022	Best New Drama	Heartstopper	Won	
TV Choice Awards	12 February 2024	Best Drama Series	Heartstopper	Nominated	
TV Choice Awards	12 February 2024	Best Actor	Kit Connor	Nominated	
TV Choice Awards	12 February 2024	Best Actress	Yasmin Finney	Nominated	
Velma Awards	10 December 2024	Best Queer Show You Wish Existed When You Were Growing Up	Heartstopper series 2	Won	
Visionary Arts Awards	21 March 2023	TV Show of the Year	Heartstopper	Nominated	
