= Music of Heartstopper (TV series) =

Soundtrack album to the television series Heartstopper

The music for the British coming-of-age romantic comedy-drama television series Heartstopper is composed by Adiescar Chase. The series consisted of Chase's original score as well as pop songs performed by queer artists for the three seasons. Heartstopper's 25-track score album was published by Netflix Music in April 2022 in conjunction with the first season's premiere. The recurrent soundtrack for the second season released in July 2023, and the soundtrack for the third season followed in October 2024.

== Background ==
Heartstopper's original score was composed by English multi-instrumentalist Adiescar Chase. It was the maiden project she signed after completing her graduation from the National Film and Television School and had read the webcomic prior to signing the show, which she felt connected with because of her bisexuality. Each episodes' score has been chronologically completed within span of one to three weeks and provided directions to supplement the pre-existing songs used throughout the series. Chase wrote the themes playing chords on the keyboard, and employ electronic riffs on a synthesizer and added sound effects to provide a contemporary feel. Each character themes had been recurringly used throughout the series as well as themes for new characters' were composed with each season. Chase further bought a new synthesizer to record the score for the second season.

Matt Biffa and Ciara Elwis served as the music supervisors. According to the executive producer Patrick Walters, he and Oseman curated Spotify playlists while refining the script adding that the music compilation was intended to evoke the experiences of being a teenager in the United Kingdom, while Biffa added that the show emphasized on using bedroom pop to make it more accessible and homemade. Walters also acknowledged the use of queer artists which he considered intentional. Baby Queen's music occurred throughout the three seasons, and she wrote an original song "Colours of You" was written for the first season to reflect the lead character's acceptance towards his sexuality.

== Track listing ==
=== Season 1 ===
Heartstopper: Season 1 (Soundtrack from the Netflix Series)

Soundtrack album by Adiescar Chase
- Released: 22 April 2022
- Genre: Soundtrack
- Length: 32:40
- Label: Netflix Music

Heartstopper: Season 1 (Soundtrack from the Netflix Series) is the soundtrack to the series' first season. It was released through Netflix Music on 22 April 2022, coinciding with the series' premiere.

No.	Title	Length
1.	"First Sight"	1:09
2.	"Deja Vu"	0:57
3.	"X"	0:44
4.	"Head in the Clouds"	1:00
5.	"On the Move"	1:02
6.	"Angst"	1:25
7.	"Off to Nick's"	0:41
8.	"Just Friends"	1:26
9.	"Milkshakes"	1:24
10.	"Falling Leaves"	1:03
11.	"Electricity"	1:03
12.	"The Lads"	1:10
13.	"Misconceptions"	1:12
14.	"Kiss"	2:05
15.	"Possibilities"	2:04
16.	"Clash"	1:07
17.	"Rugby Match"	3:24
18.	"Wanna Go Out Sometime"	0:55
19.	"Happy Complications"	0:50
20.	"New Best Friend"	0:44
21.	"Embrace"	1:02
22.	"Exploration"	1:56
23.	"Sports Day"	0:48
24.	"Heartstopper"	2:32
25.	"Encore"	0:57
Total length:		32:40

=== Season 2 ===
Heartstopper: Season 2 (Soundtrack from the Netflix Series)

Soundtrack album by Adiescar Chase
- Released: 28 July 2023
- Genre: Soundtrack
- Length: 31:44
- Label: Netflix Music

Heartstopper: Season 2 (Soundtrack from the Netflix Series) is the soundtrack to the second season of the series, which released on 28 July 2023 six days prior to its premiere.

No.	Title	Length
1.	"Boyfriend"	1:22
2.	"Back to School"	1:10
3.	"Rugby Fail"	1:06
4.	"T + E"	2:29
5.	"Exam"	0:59
6.	"David"	1:04
7.	"Star-crossed Lovers"	1:44
8.	"School Trip"	1:43
9.	"Panic"	0:37
10.	"All That Mattered"	1:45
11.	"Slumber"	0:51
12.	"You Taste Like Toothpaste"	1:28
13.	"Pair Up"	2:24
14.	"Best Friends"	1:15
15.	"What's Wrong"	0:51
16.	"Mon Amour"	0:46
17.	"He Doesn't Know Me"	1:24
18.	"I'm Bi Actually"	1:30
19.	"Out"	0:52
20.	"Misperceptions"	1:48
21.	"Sorry"	0:55
22.	"Prom"	1:06
23.	"Telling People"	1:43
24.	"❤️"	0:52
Total length:		31:44

=== Season 3 ===
Heartstopper: Season 3 (Soundtrack from the Netflix Series)

Soundtrack album by Adiescar Chase
- Released: 4 October 2024
- Genre: Soundtrack
- Length: 38:49
- Label: Netflix Music

Heartstopper: Season 3 (Soundtrack from the Netflix Series) is the soundtrack to the third season of the series released through Netflix Music on 4 October 2024. It also features a song "C'est La Vie" performed by Chase and Lelia Khan.

No.	Title	Artist(s)	Length
1.	"Jellyfish"		1:41
2.	"Beach Day"		1:42
3.	"ILY"		2:12
4.	"Concern"		0:42
5.	"Tori"		1:59
6.	"Dinner"		1:08
7.	"Phone Call"		1:03
8.	"Advice"		1:25
9.	"Nick"		1:33
10.	"Kiss Me"		0:46
11.	"Too Much"		1:19
12.	"Going Home"		1:22
13.	"Safe With You"		1:46
14.	"Better As Friends"		1:30
15.	"Palpitations"		2:20
16.	"We Could..."		1:34
17.	"Cucumber"		0:37
18.	"Little Farouk"		0:57
19.	"Cooking"		0:51
20.	"You Can't Stop Me"		1:20
21.	"Feel Like I Woke Up"		3:06
22.	"Afterwards"		2:33
23.	"Funfair"		1:06
24.	"Reunited"		1:50
25.	"C'est La Vie"	Leila Khan; Adiescar Chase	2:27
Total length:			38:49

== Chart performance ==
Chart performance for Heartstopper: Season 1 (Soundtrack from the Netflix Series)
Chart (2022–2026)	Peak position
UK Album Downloads (Official Charts)	63
UK Soundtrack Albums (Official Charts)	15

== Additional music ==
=== Season 1 ===
No.	Title	Artist	Length
1.	"Want Me" (Meet)	Baby Queen
2.	"Lovesick" (Meet)	Peace
3.	"Dover Beach" (Meet)	Baby Queen
4.	"Don't Delete the Kisses" (Meet)	Wolf Alice
5.	"Sappho" (Crush)	Frankie Cosmos
6.	"Girls" (Crush)	Girl in Red
7.	"Dance with Me" (Crush)	Beabadoobee
8.	"Why Am I Like This?" (Crush)	Orla Gartland
9.	"My Own Person" (Kiss)	Smoothboi Ezra
10.	"Telephone" (Kiss)	Waterparks
11.	"LUCID" (Kiss)	Rina Sawayama
12.	"Clearest Blue" (Kiss)	CHVRCHES
13.	"Alaska (Toby Green Remix)" (Kiss)	Maggie Rogers
14.	"What's It Gonna Be?" (Secret)	Shura
15.	"Heart" (Secret)	Flor
16.	"Nothing Else I Could Do" (Friend)	Ella Jane
17.	"UrbanAngel1999" (Friend)	Thomas Headon
18.	"If You Want To" (Friend)	Beabadoobee
19.	"Buzzkill" (Friend)	Baby Queen
20.	"Fever Dream" (Friend)	mxmtoon
21.	"Paper Mache World" (Friend)	Matilda Mann
22.	"I Want to Be with You" (Friend)	Chloe Moriondo
23.	"Knock Me off My Feet" (Girls)	Soak
24.	"Flirting with Her" (Girls)	Sir Babygirl
25.	"Bang Bang Bang" (Bully)	Lauran Hibberd
26.	"Tired" (Bully)	Beabadoobee
27.	"Any Other Way" (Bully)	Tomberlin
28.	"Smokey Eyes" (Bully)	Lincoln
29.	"Our Window" (Boyfriend)	Noah and the Whale
30.	"Because I Love You" (Boyfriend)	Montaigne
31.	"Close to You" (Boyfriend)	Dayglow
32.	"Moment in the Sun" (Boyfriend)	Sunflower Bean
33.	"I Belong in Your Arms (Photek Remix)" (Boyfriend)	Chairlift

=== Season 2 ===
No.	Title	Artist	Length
1.	"Shatter" (Out)	Maggie Rogers
2.	"Out of My League" (Out)	Fitz and the Tantrums
3.	"Pressure to Party" (Out)	Julia Jacklin
4.	"The Beach" (Out)	Wolf Alice
5.	"Coming of Age" (Family)	mxmtoon
6.	"Paradise" (Family)	Carmody
7.	"You Wouldn't Like Me" (Family)	Tegan and Sara
8.	"Retrospect" (Promise)	Vistas
9.	"Things Will Be Fine (Bratty remix)" (Promise)	Metronom
10.	"The Sound" (Promise)	The 1975
11.	"Le Temps de l'amour" (Promise)	Françoise Hardy
12.	"Missu" (Promise)	Bad Smith
13.	"Lovesong" (Promise)	Beabadoobee
14.	"Obsessed" (Challenge)	Hatchie
15.	"Tresor" (Challenge)	Hervé
16.	"Un Peu Plus Souvent" (Challenge)	Alexia Gredy
17.	"Mona Lisa" (Challenge)	mxmtoon
18.	"Freak Out" (Challenge)	Miya Folick
19.	"Nobody Really Cares" (Heat)	Baby Queen
20.	"Doesn't Matter (Valour de Soleil)" (Heat)	Christine and the Queens
21.	"Fall In Love With A Girl" (Heat)	Cavetown feat. Orla Gartland
22.	"Never Be The Same" (Heat)	Gabrielle Aplin
23.	"On était beau" (Truth/Dare)	Louane
24.	"Bros" (Truth/Dare)	Wolf Alice
25.	"3D Feelings" (Truth/Dare)	Alfie Templeman
26.	"Then It All Goes Away" (Truth/Dare)	Dayglow
27.	"Hot and Heavy" (Truth/Dare)	Lucy Dacus
28.	"Pretty Girl Lie" (Truth/Dare)	Baby Queen
29.	"Deep End" (Truth/Dare)	Holly Humberstone
30.	"We Can Be Anything" (Sorry)	Baby Queen
31.	"Cry!" (Sorry)	Caroline Rose
32.	"Crush Culture" (Sorry)	Conan Gray
33.	"Skin" (Sorry)	Carmody
34.	"Blush" (Sorry)	Wolf Alice
35.	"Colours of You" (Perfect)	Baby Queen
36.	"Run Away with Me" (Perfect)	Carly Rae Jepsen
37.	"Young" (Perfect)	Neon Capital
38.	"Happy New Year" (Perfect)	Let's Eat Grandma
39.	"Seven" (Perfect)	Taylor Swift
40.	"Ur So Pretty" (Perfect)	Wasia Project

=== Season 3 ===
No.	Title	Artist	Length
1.	"The Way Things Go" (Love)	Beabadoobee
2.	"It's Euphoric" (Love)	Georgia
3.	"Paradise Calling" (Love)	Birdy
4.	"Happy, Healthy, Well-Adjusted" (Love)	Max Bennett Kelly
5.	"A Letter to Myself at 17" (Love)	Baby Queen
6.	"Duet" (Love)	Frankie Cosmos
7.	"Best Day of My Life" (Love)	Tom Odell
8.	"It Gets Better" (Home)	Martin Luke Brown
9.	"I'm Not Perfect (But I'm Trying)" (Home)	Rachel Chinouriri
10.	"Shell" (Home)	Ethan Tasch
11.	"Vertigo" (Home)	Griff
12.	"My Vine" (Home)	Wasia Project
13.	"Car Park" (Talk)	Nieve Ella
14.	"Pretty Boy" (Talk)	LÉON
15.	"Genesis" (Talk)	Grimes
16.	"One That Got Away" (Talk)	MUNA
17.	"I Spend Too Much Time in My Room" (Journey)	The Band Camino
18.	"Black Friday" (Journey)	Tom Odell
19.	"Blue" (Journey)	Billie Eilish
20.	"Wish on an Eyelash" (Journey)	Mallrat
21.	"Serotonin" (Journey)	Angie McMahon
22.	"That Was the Worst Christmas Ever!" (Winter)	Sufjan Stevens
23.	"Are You OK?" (Winter)	Wasuremono
24.	"Bruises Off the Peach" (Winter)	Ryan Beatty
25.	"So Clear" (Winter)	Miya Folick
26.	"Enjoy Your Life" (Winter)	Romy
27.	"Rush" (Winter)	Troye Sivan
28.	"Loveher" (Winter)	Romy
29.	"In My Head" (Winter)	Nell Mescal
30.	"I Used to Be Fun" (Body)	Teen Jesus and the Jean Teasers
31.	"Just Stay for Once" (Body)	Imani Graham
32.	"Good 4 U" (Body)	Olivia Rodrigo
33.	"A Running Start" (Body)	Sufjan Stevens
34.	"Dive" (Together)	Olivia Dean
35.	"Heartbreaker" (Together)	Birdy
36.	"The Most Beautiful Thing" (Together)	Thomas Headon
37.	"Ode to a Conversation Stuck in Your Throat" (Together)	Del Water Gap
38.	"Love You" (Apart)	Flowerovlove
39.	"Right There for Now" (Apart)	Bakar
40.	"Close One" (Apart)	Fizz
41.	"Joe" (Apart)	Joesef
42.	"A Good Thing" (Apart)	Claud
43.	"The Outsiders" (Apart)	Max Bennett Kelly
44.	"Million Little Reasons" (Apart)	Oscar Lang

== Awards and nominations ==
Award	Date of ceremony	Category	Recipient(s)	Result	Ref(s).
British Academy Television Craft Awards	28 April 2024	Original Music: Fiction	Adiescar Chase for Heartstopper	Nominated	
Hollywood Music in Media Awards	16 November 2022	Song/Score - Trailer	Baby Queen for the Heartstopper trailer – "Colours of You"	Nominated	
MTV Movie & TV Awards	5 June 2022	Best Musical Moment	Heartstopper – "Dance With Me"	Won	
