= Kizzy Edgell =

English actor (born 2002)

- Born: 15 August 2002 (age 23)
- Occupation: Actor
- Years active: 2022–present

Kizzy Edgell (born 15 August 2002) is an English actor. He (Note: Edgell uses he/him and they/them pronouns. This article uses he/him for consistency.) is best known for his role as Darcy Olsson in the Netflix teen series Heartstopper (2022–2026) and the 2026 film Heartstopper Forever.

== Early life ==
Edgell was born on 15 August 2002 and is from Wandsworth, South London. He attended Orleans Park School and studied psychology before going into acting.

== Career ==
Edgell made his television debut starring as Darcy Olsson, a lesbian character who later comes out as non-binary, in the Netflix teen series Heartstopper, an adaptation of the comic by Alice Oseman. His character is the romantic interest of Corinna Brown's character Tara Jones. The first season premiered in 2022. Edgell was featured, with other leading cast members of Heartstopper, on the cover of Attitude.

== Personal life ==
Edgell formerly identified as non-binary and used exclusively they/them pronouns. In 2023, he came out as transmasculine and queer, and uses he/him, they/them and he/they pronouns.

== Filmography ==
=== Television ===
Year	Title	Role	Notes
2022–2024	Heartstopper	Darcy Olsson	Main role; 24 episodes
2023	Tudum: A Netflix Global Fan Event	Himself	

=== Film ===
Year	Title	Role
2026	Heartstopper Forever	Darcy Olsson
