= List of Heartstopper episodes =

Episodes of British television series

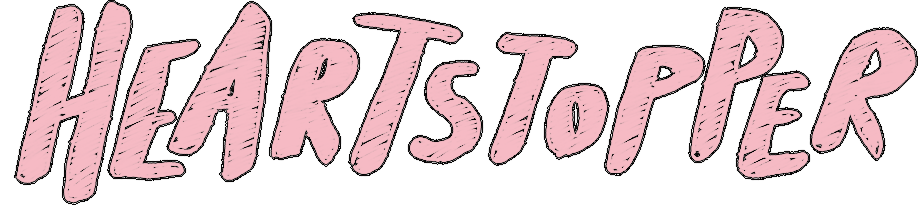
Heartstopper logo

Heartstopper is a British coming-of-age romantic comedy-drama television series created and written by Alice Oseman for Netflix, based on her webcomic and graphic novel series of the same name. Starring Kit Connor and Joe Locke as Nick Nelson and Charlie Spring, it follows two teenagers whose friendship at Truham Grammar School develops into a romantic relationship. As the characters grow older, the series expands to explore sexuality, gender identity, mental health, intimacy and early adulthood.

Produced by See-Saw Films, Heartstopper was adapted for television after the company acquired the screen rights in 2019. Netflix ordered the series in January 2021, with Oseman writing and Euros Lyn directing and executive producing. Oseman wrote every released episode. Lyn directed the first two series, with Andy Newbery directing the third.

The first series of eight episodes premiered on 22 April 2022, followed by a second on 3 August 2023 and a third on 3 October 2024. The series was renewed for second and third series in May 2022, and after the release of the third series, Oseman said that any continuation would be the final chapter of the screen adaptation. In April 2025, Netflix announced that the adaptation would conclude with a feature-length finale film, Heartstopper Forever, which was released on 17 July 2026.

The series has received widespread critical acclaim, with reviewers praising its writing, performances, and warm, affirming portrayal of LGBTQ+ youth. The series has won several accolades and been nominated for numerous others. During the course of the programme, 25 episodes of Heartstopper were released over three series, concluding on 22 April 2022.

== Series overview ==
Series	Episodes	Originally released
1	8	22 April 2022
2	8	3 August 2023
3	8	3 October 2024
Film		17 July 2026

== Episodes ==
=== Series 1 (2022) ===
Episodes of series 1
No. overall	No. in series	Title	Directed by	Written by	Original release date
1	1	"Meet"	Euros Lyn	Alice Oseman	22 April 2022
Truham Grammar School student Charlie Spring is in a secret relationship with Ben Hope. In his new form, Charlie is assigned to sit next to Nick Nelson, a rugby player for whom he develops feelings. They become friends, though Charlie is unsure of Nick's sexuality. Charlie sees Ben in the corridor and greets him, but Ben pretends not to know him. Later, Ben apologises. Nick invites Charlie to join the rugby team and he accepts. After seeing Ben kissing a girl and realising his own unhappiness in the relationship, Charlie tells Ben he does not want to meet up any more. Later, Charlie reluctantly meets with Ben again, who forcibly kisses him but is fended off by Nick. Meanwhile, one of Charlie's friends, Elle Argent, has moved to Higgs Girls School after coming out as a transgender girl.
2	2	"Crush"	Euros Lyn	Alice Oseman	22 April 2022
Charlie vents to Nick about his relationship with Ben, whom Nick condemns. Charlie's friend Tao Xu assumes that Nick is heterosexual and tells Charlie to abandon his feelings, but he refuses. Tao tells him that Nick has a crush on a girl named Tara Jones, whom Elle soon learns is in a same-sex relationship with Darcy Olsson. While hanging out at Charlie's house, Nick tries to hold Charlie's hand while he is sleeping and begins to question his sexuality.
3	3	"Kiss"	Euros Lyn	Alice Oseman	22 April 2022
Nick is invited to his friend Harry Greene's 16th birthday party and invites Charlie, who accepts. Tao is unhappy that Nick has been causing his and Charlie's friendship to become more distant. At the party, Harry and his group try to set Nick up with Tara. Tara comes out to Nick, who tells off Harry after he makes fun of Charlie. Imogen Heaney, one of Nick's friends, tells Nick she likes him. Charlie tells Ben to leave him alone. Nick and Charlie go to a secluded room, where they kiss; Nick is dumbfounded and leaves after he hears Harry looking for him. Though heartbroken, Charlie is surprised to see Nick at his doorstep the next day in the pouring rain.
4	4	"Secret"	Euros Lyn	Alice Oseman	22 April 2022
Charlie apologises to Nick for what happened the previous day. Nick kisses him, explaining that he is still closeted and confused; Charlie says he does not need to publicly declare anything. At school, they spend more time together while eating lunch. After a rugby game, Nick visits Charlie in the sick bay and is briefly interrupted by their friend, Isaac Henderson. Tao and Elle overhear Nick reluctantly agreeing to a peer-pressured date with Imogen.
5	5	"Friend"	Euros Lyn	Alice Oseman	22 April 2022
Nick is about to cancel his date with Imogen when she reveals that her dog died, and Nick reverts his plan because he feels sorry for her. Charlie invites Nick to his 15th birthday celebration, which happens to be on the same day, but Nick decides to be with Charlie. Tao tells Charlie about Nick and Imogen. Nick overhears the two of them, later clarifying matters to Charlie before explicitly admitting his feelings for him, which Charlie reciprocates. The next day, Nick explains to Imogen that he does not like her romantically, and she thanks him for his honesty.
6	6	"Girls"	Euros Lyn	Alice Oseman	22 April 2022
Nick thinks he might be bisexual; Charlie tells him to take his time. Nick comes out to Tara and Darcy, who suggest a double date. After Elle reveals she has feelings for Tao, the group secretly makes it a triple date in the hope of setting the two up. On the date, Elle notices their intentions and confronts them, saying she does not want any more change in her life and wants to protect her friendship with Tao, though she is happy for Nick and Charlie. Later, Tara angrily leaves an orchestral concert after hearing homophobic comments, but Darcy calms her down and they return to perform.
7	7	"Bully"	Euros Lyn	Alice Oseman	22 April 2022
Nick invites Charlie to the cinema with his friends, reassuring him that Ben and Harry are not coming. However, they both turn up, and Harry bullies Charlie about his sexuality. After Charlie leaves, Nick tells Harry to stop the bullying. Harry calls Charlie a fag and a fight breaks out. At the car park, Ben tells Charlie that Nick does not care for him and that no one could. Tao feels guilty for unintentionally worsening Charlie's situation by verbally attacking Harry, but as Charlie continues to ignore him, he gets into a fight with Harry and confronts Charlie for not telling him about his relationship with Nick.
8	8	"Boyfriend"	Euros Lyn	Alice Oseman	22 April 2022
Harry is suspended for the fight and Charlie's friendship with Tao is still strained. Depressed, Charlie quits rugby and ignores Nick. Nick and Tao bond and find common ground in wanting Charlie to be happy. Tao reconciles with Charlie, who also confronts Ben for being abusive. Nick tells Charlie that he does not want to break up and they kiss. On a date at the seaside, Nick reveals his plan to come out and tell their friends. Later that day, he comes out to his mother, who accepts him.

=== Series 2 (2023) ===
Episodes of series 2
No. overall	No. in series	Title	Directed by	Written by	Original release date
9	1	"Out"	Euros Lyn	Alice Oseman	3 August 2023
As Nick and Charlie's relationship matures, Nick faces the challenge of opening up to others outside their friend circle. At a sleepover with Charlie's friend group, he gradually manages to come out to Imogen, who acknowledges that she already knows, and reveals that she is dating Ben. Elle and Tao face uncertainties about forming a relationship. Charlie rejoins Truham's rugby team and opens up to his parents about his relationship; however, his father bans Nick from coming over to prevent any sexual behaviour. Charlie vows to be there for Nick in his coming-out process.
10	2	"Family"	Euros Lyn	Alice Oseman	3 August 2023
With grades coming in, Charlie's parents ban him from visiting Nick until he has improved his grades and finished a school essay. Tao begins to feel distant and jealous of Elle as she visits the Lambert School of Art and makes new friends. His mother encourages him to fight to keep her as a friend, and he admits to Charlie and Isaac that he likes her. Nick's brother David returns from university and disapproves of Nick and Charlie's relationship. Nick grows worried about Imogen dating Ben; when she asks what Ben has done, Nick says he cannot tell her.
11	3	"Promise"	Euros Lyn	Alice Oseman	3 August 2023
Charlie finishes his essay and motivates Nick for his final GCSE exam, in which he succeeds. Nick tries to come out to his rugby friends but is constantly interrupted by Harry. Recognising his stress, Charlie suggests that Nick forget about coming out for now. After doing some research on how to impress a crush, Tao asks Elle out and she accepts. Following a failed date, Tao becomes jealous of Elle getting closer to her new friends from Lambert, then blames himself for seemingly ruining every situation.
12	4	"Challenge"	Euros Lyn	Alice Oseman	3 August 2023
The students go on a school trip to Paris. Charlie, Nick, Tao and Isaac are assigned to the same hotel room, while Tara, Darcy, Elle and Sahar Zahid share another. Tao and Elle begin to warm towards each other and decide to remain friends; Tao apologises for his earlier outburst. Charlie and Tara discuss the problems with their respective partners. Imogen breaks up with Ben after he ignores her and obsesses over Charlie; Nick and Charlie comfort her. Nick gives Charlie a hickey on his neck while they make out.
13	5	"Heat"	Euros Lyn	Alice Oseman	3 August 2023
Charlie's hickey prompts speculation among the other students about who gave it to him. Charlie forgives Tao for unintentionally causing him to be outed in the past and challenges his pessimism regarding him and Elle. Later, while spending time together, Elle kisses Tao, who kisses her back. Tara confronts Darcy for not responding when Tara said "I love you".
14	6	"Truth/Dare"	Euros Lyn	Alice Oseman	3 August 2023
Nick introduces Charlie to his French father Stéphane, who reveals his plan to visit England. As an apology, Darcy arranges a party in the hotel room on Tara's birthday. Fellow student James McEwan, who has a crush on Isaac, kisses him but Isaac does not reciprocate. Harry apologises for his past bullying, but Charlie rejects the apology. During a game of truth or dare?, Nick comes out and says he is fine with people knowing his sexuality. After the party, Darcy reciprocates Tara's declaration of love. Meanwhile, supervising teachers Mr Ajayi and Mr Farouk develop feelings for each other and kiss.
15	7	"Sorry"	Euros Lyn	Alice Oseman	3 August 2023
Elle is accepted into Lambert; Tao says he has gotten over his envy, and Elle says she is still undecided. Isaac discovers he is asexual. Before leaving Truham, Ben asks Charlie to forgive his past actions, but Charlie refuses, saying Ben's apology only seeks self-validation. During a dinner at the Nelson home, Nick confronts David for his bullying and his father for being uninterested in his life, then tells his father that Charlie is his boyfriend. Following an argument with Darcy's homophobic mother, Darcy leaves home.
16	8	"Perfect"	Euros Lyn	Alice Oseman	3 August 2023
Nick comes out publicly on Instagram. Elle tells Tao she is going to Lambert, then accepts his proposal to be his girlfriend. At the school prom, Darcy later arrives and opens up to Tara about problems at home. Nick and Charlie's friend group leave the prom to celebrate at Nick's house. After everyone leaves, Nick asks Charlie about his past bullying. Charlie opens up about it and how it caused him to cut himself, although he no longer does so. Nick asks Charlie to tell him if he is ever stressed, and Charlie promises to do so. On the way home, Charlie composes a text to Nick that says "I love you".

=== Series 3 (2024) ===
Episodes of series 3
No. overall	No. in series	Title	Directed by	Written by	Original release date
17	1	"Love"	Andy Newbery	Alice Oseman	3 October 2024
Charlie resolves to tell Nick he loves him before the latter leaves for a Menorca holiday. The two and their friends take a day trip to the beach. Before Charlie has the chance to confess his love, Nick confronts him with his fears that Charlie has an eating disorder, but Charlie denies it. Tara convinces Darcy to move out of Tara's house and live with Darcy's grandmother Ivy. After Tao tries too hard to have a "summer of romance" with Elle, she assures him he does not have to impress her. Later, Charlie confesses his love to Nick through the bathroom door and hurriedly leaves, but Nick chases after him and they declare their feelings face-to-face.
18	2	"Home"	Andy Newbery	Alice Oseman	3 October 2024
Nick leaves for Menorca with his aunt Diane and her family, whom he tells about his relationship. Everyone receives their GCSE results. Isaac notices Charlie pulling away, but Charlie insists he is fine. Tori later finds eating-disorder research on Charlie's computer after noticing him avoiding both food and their mother, and messages Nick that she is worried. Elle soothes Tao's fear of abandonment after linking it to his father's death, and the two confess their love. Nick calls an increasingly despairing Charlie, who admits that he may have an eating disorder. Diane tells Nick that he alone cannot address Charlie's mental illness and urges him to help Charlie find professional treatment.
19	3	"Talk"	Andy Newbery	Alice Oseman	3 October 2024
Everyone returns to school and Nick and Charlie reunite. Nick increasingly worries about Charlie, who plans a zoo trip for Nick's birthday. There, Isaac expresses his frustration at feeling left out because most of the friend group are in relationships, coming out as asexual and aromantic. Elle convinces Tao to apologise to Isaac for ignoring him. Tao and Nick notice Charlie is becoming concerningly lethargic. Later, Nick convinces Charlie to tell his parents about his mental-health struggles and seek treatment.
20	4	"Journey"	Andy Newbery	Alice Oseman	3 October 2024
In December, Nick journals about the past few months. Earlier, in September, Charlie receives a referral for eating-disorder treatment but cannot get an appointment until January. His mental health and eating disorder worsen, and he starts self-harming again. He agrees to go to an inpatient mental-health clinic. At a Halloween party, Nick breaks down from missing Charlie and is comforted by Tao. Charlie later calls Nick from the clinic and reveals he has been diagnosed with anorexia nervosa and obsessive–compulsive disorder. The episode then depicts events from Charlie's point of view as he steadily recovers with the help of the clinic staff before returning home in December.
21	5	"Winter"	Andy Newbery	Alice Oseman	3 October 2024
On Christmas Day, Tori and Charlie dread the family gathering. After several awkward conversations about his mental health, Charlie fights with his mother and leaves for Nick's house. Nick argues with David over their father. Elle reveals to Tao her worries that having sex will make her feel gender dysphoria. Charlie meets Nick's extended family, including Aunt Diane. Tori later arrives in the rain to bring Charlie home and reminds him that she is there for support. On New Year's Eve, Charlie reunites with his friends at Harry's party. Partially adapted from the novella This Winter by Oseman.
22	6	"Body"	Andy Newbery	Alice Oseman	3 October 2024
In April, Charlie and his therapist Geoff review his return to school in January and a fight with Nick in February about his eating that led to a self-harm relapse. Geoff congratulates Charlie on being three months clean and on his strengthening relationship with Nick. Tao and Isaac help Charlie realise he is ready to have sex, which he drunkenly expresses to Nick at his birthday party. Charlie's friends meet Tori's new friend Michael, who Charlie suspects is her boyfriend. Tara has a panic attack about her future and university, but Charlie helps calm her down. Nick takes Charlie to meet his celebrity crush for his birthday. Later, Charlie's intense body consciousness prevents him and Nick from having sex.
23	7	"Together"	Andy Newbery	Alice Oseman	3 October 2024
Nick and Charlie grow increasingly desperate to have sex. Charlie seeks advice from Tao and Nick from Tara, who reminds him to look after himself. Mr Ajayi and Mr Farouk nominate Charlie to be Head Boy. Darcy travels to see Tara's dance class, after which Darcy tells Tara that they are exploring a non-binary identity. Tao makes a home movie of Elle to cheer her up after her disappointing radio interview. Charlie tries to get his mother to let him sleep over at Nick's, but their argument escalates. After Charlie storms off to Nick's, Nick tells him he fears he has no identity without him. The two then have sex for the first time, with Charlie keeping his shirt on.
24	8	"Apart"	Andy Newbery	Alice Oseman	3 October 2024
Charlie's mother apologises to him and shares her difficult relationship with her overbearing mother. Nick, Elle, Tara and Imogen take a road trip to visit university options. At the University of Oxford, Imogen tells Nick that she does not like boys and has been struggling with compulsory heterosexuality. Tara realises she does not like Oxford and ponders her future, while Nick admits he preferred the University of Leeds. Charlie prepares to play drums with Sahar's band at a summer fête and encourages Tori to open herself to others, especially Michael. Later, Charlie's parents let him sleep over at Nick's, where the two have sex again.

=== Film (2026) ===
Film entry
No.	Title	Directed by	Written by	Original release date
25	Heartstopper Forever	Wash Westmoreland	Alice Oseman	17 July 2026
Partially adapted from Heartstopper volume 6 and Oseman's novella Nick and Charlie.
