= Breakwater =

Breakwater may refer to:

- Breakwater (structure), a structure for protecting a beach or harbour

== Places ==
- Breakwater, Victoria, a suburb of Geelong, Victoria, Australia
- Breakwater Island, Antarctica
- Breakwater Islands, Nunavut, Canada
- Breakwater School, a Portland, Maine, pre-school and elementary school founded in 1956

== Arts and entertainment ==
- Breakwater (band), a funk and soul band from the 1970s
- Breakwater (album), a 1988 album by Lennie Gallant
- Breakwater (2023 film), an American thriller
- Breakwater (2025 film), a British thriller
- The Breakwater, an alternative name for the 1670 painting Storm Off a Sea Coast by Jacob van Ruisdael

== Other uses ==
- USS Breakwater (SP-681), a United States Navy patrol vessel, minesweeper, and tug in commission from 1917 to 1920
- Breaking the water or water breaking, a term for the rupture of membranes during pregnancy
