= Adultery (TV series) =

British television series

- Created by: Danny Brocklehurst
- Screenplay by: Danny Brocklehurst
- Directed by: Will Sinclair; Daniel O’Hara
- Starring: Dominic Cooper; Romola Garai; Shelley Conn; Matthew McNulty; Johnny Sanpher; Leila Khan
- Country of origin: United Kingdom
- Original language: English
- No. of series: 1
- No. of episodes: 6

Production
- Executive producers: Danny Brocklehurst; Polly Hill; Ben Stephenson; Preethi Mavahalli; Luke Woellhaf
- Producer: Sarah Lewis
- Running time: 45 minutes
- Production company: Poison Pen Studios

Original release
- Network: ITV1
- Release: 25 October – 9 November 2026

Adultery is a 2026 British romantic drama television series. Created by Danny Brocklehurst, it stars Dominic Cooper and Romola Garai.

It premiered on ITV1 and ITVX on 25 October 2026.

== Premise ==
Two married parents whose teenage children begin dating become attracted to one another.

== Cast ==
- Dominic Cooper as Tom Kirkman
- Romola Garai as Beth Brookes
- Shelley Conn as Hannah Kirkman
- Matthew McNulty as Neil Brookes
- Johnny Sanpher as Ollie Brookes
- Leila Khan as Jess Kirkman
- Andrew Knott as Dave
- Charley Webb as Leah Kirkman
- James Murray as Paul Kirkman

== Production ==
The six-part series is created and written by Danny Brocklehurst who described the series as a "grown-up drama about family and love and marriage and people of a certain age", with different themes such as class and grief, and modern connections made in the social media age. The series is produced by Poison Pen Studios and directed by Will Sinclair and Daniel O’Hara. with Sarah Lewis as series producer. Ben Stephenson, Preethi Mavahalli and Luke Woellhaf are executive producers alongside Brocklehurst and Polly Hill.

The cast is led by Dominic Cooper, Romola Garai, Shelley Conn and Matthew McNulty with Johnny Sanpher, Leila Khan, James Murray, Charley Webb and Andrew Knott.

The series was filmed in Lancashire in late-2025, with filming locations including Darwen, Hoddlesden, Bolton and Blackpool.

== Broadcast ==
Adultery premiered on ITV1 on 25 October 2026, with all episodes available to stream on ITVX.
