= Quarter Life Crisis (album) =

Studio album by Baby Queen
- Released: 10 November 2023
- Genre: Synth-pop
- Length: 42:28
- Label: Polydor; Universal
- Producer: King Ed; Max Wolfgang

Baby Queen chronology
The Yearbook (2021)	Quarter Life Crisis (2023)	I Hope You Don't Remember Me (2026)

Singles from Quarter Life Crisis
- 1. "Dream Girl" Released: 9 June 2023; 2. "We Can Be Anything" Released: 20 July 2023; 3. "All the Things" Released: 10 August 2023; 4. "Quarter Life Crisis" Released: 8 September 2023; 5. "23" Released: 13 October 2023; 6. "I Can't Get My Shit Together" Released: 27 October 2023; 7. "Obvious" Released: 10 November 2023; 8. "Every Time I Get High" Released: 5 January 2024

Quarter Life Crisis is the debut studio album by South African singer and songwriter Baby Queen. It was released on 10 November 2023 through Polydor Records. It was entirely produced by King Ed with additional production from Baby Queen, Mark Ralph, Max Wolfgang, and Scott Culcombe. The lead single "Dream Girl" was released 9 June 2023, which was then followed by "We Can Be Anything" released 20 July 2023 ahead of its feature in Netflix's Heartstopper.

== Background ==
On 12 May 2023, Baby Queen teased a snippet of a new single on her social media accounts, which she said would be a part of her upcoming debut album. A few days later, on 19 May 2023, she announced the album's lead single "Dream Girl" in an Instagram post. Following the release of "Dream Girl" on 9 June Latham released a music video alongside the new single.

On 16 July 2023, Latham teased yet another song on her social media. On 20 July, Latham announced the title of the album's second single, "We Can Be Anything". She premiered it on an Instagram live on the Heartstopper Instagram account. The next day, Latham released a music video for the single, where in the music video, it followed on from "Dream Girl".

On 10 August 2023, Latham announced her debut album would be released on 6 October 2023. She revealed the artwork for both the standard and deluxe editions. The deluxe edition's artwork was designed by Alice Oseman. Latham also announced the Quarter Life Crisis Tour of the United Kingdom for November 2023, with two dates in the United States. On the same day, she also released the third single "All the Things", which featured in the eighth episode of the second series of Heartstopper. The song is part of the seven songs featured in Heartstopper (including "Colours of You"), and on the deluxe edition of the album.

In an interview with NME, Latham stated, "This album tells the story of my journey through my early 20s – leaving my childhood and my adolescence behind but never really losing my childlike wonder and never quite growing up. The songs are all facets of what early adulthood has been like for me while discovering new parts of myself, my sexuality, my past and my place in this world." Latham also said she wished that the album would "leave people feeling hopeful".

On 6 September 2023, Latham announced the title track as the fourth single off the upcoming debut album, Quarter Life Crisis. The song was released on 8 September 2023, which it was accompanied by a music video.

On 12 September 2023, Latham stated in a post that "owing to consequences out of my control, my album is going to have to be pushed back to release on Friday the 10th November". She apologised for disappointing her fans and understands that they have been waiting a while for the record and she has too. Baby Queen also stated that she has other things to tell her fans in weeks to come.

== Critical reception ==
Professional ratings
Aggregate scores
Source	Rating
Metacritic	76/100
Review scores
Source	Rating
Clash	7/10
DIY	4/5 stars
The Line of Best Fit	8/10
NME	3/5 stars

Quarter Life Crisis received a score of 76 out of 100 on review aggregator Metacritic based on six critics' reviews, indicating "generally favorable" reception. Caitlin Chatterton of The Line of Best Fit stated that "when she isn't caught up in sarcastic commentary, Baby Queen does allow herself to be vulnerable", but "by the end of Quarter Life Crisis, though, her fears seem resolved [...] The record sits firmly within her existing catalogue, but that growing self-assurance brings a new charm to the Baby Kingdom." Reviewing the album for DIY, Ben Tipple found that the album "carries its name with a resounding insecurity, jolting its bedroom bubblegum pop from moments of cathartic self-acceptance to overwhelming self-doubt" and that Baby Queen "pairs her distinct brand of pop with real substance".

Lauren Hague of Clash felt that the album "reigns true to Baby Queen's signature synth-pop sound whilst being let down by lyrical cliches on a couple of the more manufactured upbeat, pop tracks" as Baby Queen "triumphs on the more toned-down tracks". NME's Sophie Williams wrote that Quarter Life Crisis "moves between moods that translate to bright, Day Glo colours ('Kid Genius') or dark goth accents ('Die Alone')", calling it "a divide that exemplifies this album, and leaves you wondering whether an audience beyond Latham's own longtime followers will find something to connect with".

== Track listing ==
Standard edition
No.	Title	Writer(s)	Producer(s)	Length
1.	"We Can Be Anything"	Arabella Latham; Edward James Carlile; Jack Leonard	King Ed; Latham^{[a]}	3:21
2.	"Kid Genius"	Latham; Carlile; Max Wolfgang	King Ed	3:21
3.	"Dream Girl"	Latham; Carlile	King Ed; Latham^{[a]}; Mark Ralph^{[a]}	3:42
4.	"I Can't Get My Shit Together"	Latham; Carlile; Wolfgang	King Ed	2:53
5.	"Love Killer"	Latham; Carlile	King Ed; Latham^{[a]}	3:31
6.	"Grow Up"	Latham; Carlile	King Ed	4:04
7.	"Quarter Life Crisis"	Latham; Wolfgang	King Ed^{[p]}; Wolfgang; Ralph^{[a]}	3:03
8.	"Die Alone"	Latham; Carlile; Wolfgang	King Ed	3:21
9.	"Obvious"	Latham	King Ed; Latham^{[a]}	4:18
10.	"23"	Latham; Carlile	King Ed	3:58
11.	"Every Time I Get High"	Latham; Carlile; Scott Culcombe	King Ed; Culcombe^{[a]}	3:37
12.	"A Letter to Myself at 17"	Latham; Carlile; Nathan Challinor	King Ed	3:19
Total length:				42:26

Deluxe edition
No.	Title	Writer(s)	Producer(s)	Length
13.	"Video Games"	Latham; Carlile	King Ed	1:21
14.	"U Suck!"	Latham; Carlilie; Wolfgang	King Ed	3:29
15.	"Pretty Girl Lie"	Latham; Carlile	King Ed	3:39
16.	"Want Me"	Latham; Carlile	King Ed	4:18
17.	"Buzzkill"	Latham; Carlile	King Ed	3:24
18.	"Dover Beach"	Latham; Carlile; Challinor	King Ed	3:38
19.	"Nobody Really Cares"	Latham; Carlile; Leonard	King Ed; Cam Blackwood^{[a]}	2:54
20.	"Colours of You"	Latham; Carlile	King Ed	4:15
21.	"All the Things"	Latham; Carlile	King Ed	3:22
Total length:				73:20

Note

- ^{^[p]} signifies a primary and vocal producer.
- ^{^[a]} signifies an additional producer.

== Personnel ==
Musicians

- Arabella Lennox – vocals (all tracks), background vocals (tracks 1–6, 8–12, 17–21), synthesizer (1, 5, 9), electric guitar (1, 15, 16), acoustic guitar (6, 9), glockenspiel (6), foot stamping (17)
- Ed Carlile – synthesizer (1–6, 8–17, 19–21), programming (1–6, 8–12, 14–17, 19–21), percussion (1–6, 8–12, 14–16, 18–21), drums (1–7, 8, 9, 11, 12, 14–21), synth bass (1–6, 8, 10, 14, 18, 21), bass (1–3, 5, 6, 8, 9, 11–13, 15, 16, 18, 19, 21), electric guitar (1–3, 5, 6, 8, 11, 13, 14, 16, 18, 19, 21), piano (1, 2, 5, 6, 8–12, 15, 18, 20), keyboards (1, 3, 17, 18, 21), acoustic guitar (1, 6, 9–12, 15, 17, 18), background vocals (2, 11, 14, 16), Mellotron (2, 4, 6, 12), drum programming (13), glockenspiel (18)
- Dan Grech-Marguerat – programming (1–5, 18–20)
- Max Wolfgang – Mellotron (2), synthesizer (4), electric guitar (7, 8); bass, drums (7); background vocals (14)
- Mark Ralph – keyboards, programming (3, 7); drums, synthesizer (7)
- Josh Ager – programming (14)
- Harrison Koisser – electric guitar (15, 17)
- Nathan Challinor – electric guitar (7, 17, 18), additional keyboards (18)
- Cam Blackwood – bass, electric guitar, percussion, programming, synthesizer (19)
- Jack Leonard – electric guitar (19)

Technical

- Chris Gehringer – mastering (1–6, 8–14, 21)
- Will Quinnell – mastering (7), mastering assistance (1, 2, 4–6, 8–14)
- John Greenham – mastering (15–17)
- Matt Colton – mastering (18)
- Joe LaPorta – mastering (19)
- Dick Beetham – mastering (20)
- Dan Grech-Marguerat – mixing (1–5, 15–20)
- Cenzo Townshend – mixing, immersive mix engineering (6, 8, 9, 12, 21)
- Mark Ralph – mixing (7, 11)
- Ed Carlile – mixing (13); engineering, recording (1–6, 8–21)
- Josh Ager – mixing (14)
- Drew Bang – engineering, recording (7)
- Cam Blackwood – engineering, recording (19)
- Stan Kybert – immersive mix engineering (7, 11, 13, 15, 17–20)
- Charles Haydon Hicks – mixing assistance (1–5, 18–20)
- Luke Burgoyne – mixing assistance (1–5, 18–20)
- Camden Clarke – mixing assistance (6–9, 12, 21)
- Rob Sellens – mixing assistance (6–9, 12, 21)

== Charts ==
Chart performance for Quarter Life Crisis
Chart (2023)	Peak position
Scottish Albums (OCC)	5
UK Albums (OCC)	5

== Release history ==
Release dates and formats for Quarter Life Crisis
Region	Date	Format(s)	Label	Ref.
Various	10 November 2023	Bundle; cassette tape; CD; digital download; streaming; vinyl LP	Polydor	
