= Helena Romanes School =

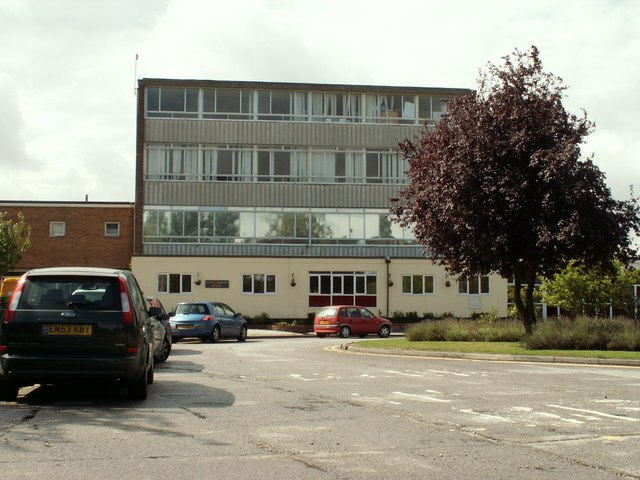

Location
- Parsonage Downs; Great Dunmow, Essex, CM6 2AU; England; 51°52′54″N 0°21′16″E

Information
- Type: Academy
- Established: 1958
- Trust: Saffron Academy Trust
- Department for Education URN: 137975 Tables
- Ofsted: Reports
- Executive Headteacher: Catherine Davis
- Headteacher- Primary Phase: Jennifer Hone
- Gender: Coeducational
- Age: 4 to 18
- Website: http://www.helena-romanes.essex.sch.uk/

Helena Romanes School (also known/abbreviated as HRS) is a coeducational all-through school and sixth form. It is situated in Great Dunmow in the English county of Essex. On the premises, there is a sports and leisure centre that is shared with the local community. It is also occasionally utilised in Physical Education lessons

== History ==
Helena Romanes School was named after the first Chair of Governors (Helena Romanes) the daughter of Sir Almroth Wright. The school was built in 1958 and has remained on the same site since. More buildings were later added and it became a fully comprehensive secondary school in 1970.

Previously a foundation school administered by the Essex County Council, in April 2012 the school converted to academy status. The school is now sponsored by the Saffron Academy Trust.

In September 2021 Helena Romanes School opened a primary department for children ages 4 to 11. The primary department moved to a new dedicated building soon after.

== Academics ==
Helena Romanes School offers GCSEs, BTECs, Cambridge Nationals and ASDAN awards as programmes of study for pupils.

Students in the sixth form have the option to study from a range of A-Levels and further BTECs.

== Notable alumni ==
- Leila Khan, actress
