= Leila Khan (actress) =

English actress

- Education: Anglia Ruskin University
- Occupation: actress

Leila Khan is an English actress. She is known for her roles as Sahar Zahid in the Netflix series Heartstopper (2023–2026) and film Heartstopper Forever (2026), and as Amira Dhawan in the BBC series Crookhaven (2026).

== Education ==
Khan grew up in Harlow and moved to Great Dunmow when she was fourteen years old. She studied at Helena Romanes School, and stayed on there for sixth form to study law, English literature, and drama.

Khan graduated with a First Class Honours degree in Drama and English literature at Anglia Ruskin University.

== Career ==
Khan joined the cast of the British coming-of-age romantic comedy drama series Heartstopper during the show's second season, playing the role of Sahar Zahid. Her character returned in the show's third season. She also had a role in BBC One's television series Death in Paradise during their 2023 Christmas special.

In 2026, Khan starred as Amira Dhawan in the BBC One series Crookhaven.

== Filmography ==
=== Television ===
Year	Title	Role	Notes	Ref.
2023	Death in Paradise	Riley Biggs	1 episode	
2023–2026	Heartstopper	Sahar Zahid		
2026	Crookhaven	Amira Dhawan	Main	
2026	Adultery	Jess Kirkman		

=== Film ===
Year	Title	Role
2024	A Little of the Heart	Nia
2026	Heartstopper Forever	Sahar Zahid
