= Heartstopper Forever =

2026 film by Wash Westmoreland

- Release poster
- Directed by: Wash Westmoreland
- Written by: Alice Oseman
- Based on: Heartstopper by Alice Oseman
- Produced by: Brett Thomas
- Starring: Kit Connor; Joe Locke; William Gao; Yasmin Finney; Corinna Brown; Kizzy Edgell; Tobie Donovan; Jenny Walser; Rhea Norwood; Leila Khan; Anna Maxwell Martin; Eddie Marsan; Derek Jacobi
- Cinematography: James Rhodes
- Edited by: Todd Downing
- Music by: Adiescar Chase
- Production company: See-Saw Films
- Distributed by: Netflix
- Release dates: 14 July 2026 (Cineworld Leicester Square); 17 July 2026 (Netflix)
- Running time: 114 minutes
- Country: United Kingdom
- Language: English

Heartstopper Forever is a 2026 British romantic drama film directed by Wash Westmoreland and written by Alice Oseman. It is a continuation of the Netflix television series Heartstopper (2022–2024), created by Oseman, and serves as a feature-length series finale. Kit Connor and Joe Locke star as Nick Nelson and Charlie Spring, alongside William Gao, Yasmin Finney, Corinna Brown, Kizzy Edgell, Tobie Donovan, Jenny Walser, Rhea Norwood, Leila Khan, and Eddie Marsan, all reprising their roles from the series. Anna Maxwell Martin and Derek Jacobi also star, with Martin replacing Olivia Colman in the role of Sarah Nelson.

The production was announced in April 2025 by Netflix, with Brett Thomas producing, while Connor and Locke serve as executive producers. Oseman returned to write the script, based on the sixth and final volume in the graphic novel series, as well as the novella Nick and Charlie. Principal photography occurred in England, from June to July 2025.

Heartstopper Forever premiered at the Cineworld Leicester Square in London on 14 July 2026, and was released internationally on Netflix on 17 July. The film received generally positive reviews from critics.

== Plot ==
Charlie gets voted Head Boy on a campaign against bullying and later intervenes when he sees a younger student named Alfie bullied. Mr. Lange doesn't approve a Pride club but Mr. Ajayi allows him to use his classroom for it. While the boys, Ajayi and Farouk wait there, eventually Alfie and more students drop in.

Nick decides on Leeds as his top choice for university, although he's anxious about the distance to Charlie. Nick doesn't know how to describe himself in the university application personal statement but Charlie helps him to write it and encourages him to take a volunteering job outside school, which he later takes at a dog shelter. Nick has a nightmare about Charlie dying and at a pub gets drunkenly aggressive when someone flirts with Charlie. At rugby, Nick gets into an altercation that leaves him bleeding. Charlie gifts Nick a camera to take photos of them both to take to Leeds.

Elle and Tao break up after Elle decides to move to Berlin after graduation; as they have done so several times before, their friends wonder if they will get together again or stay separated for good this time. Worried about the notion that teenage relationships don't last, an increasingly withdrawn and anxious Nick decides Charlie would be better off without him and they break up.

At home, this makes Charlie stay in and not eat, until his friends come to him instead. After Elle asks him for support in times when trans rights get attacked, they attend a Pride parade and visit a gay club, but Charlie leaves when he sees Nick speaking with a girl. Both type text messages to meet and talk without sending them. Nick's brother David tells him that he's accepted a job in Paris working under their father, and attempts to comfort him about his breakup. Invited by Tara, Nick visits the gay club meeting her, Darcy, Sahar and Imogen, who has found her identity as lesbian. There, he encounters Tao and speaks with Imogen's friend before spotting Charlie.

At his work in a café, Charlie serves an elderly gay couple, observing them talk about worrying and looking after each other. Nick talks about the effects his father had on him with his mother who encourages him not to give up on his relationship. When Charlie calls Tori and Michael a straight couple, his sister comes out as asexual and explains why they are together despite being opposites. After stumbling upon the camera again, Charlie develops the photos Nick took of them and drops them at Nick's with a message to meet at the beach, where they talk and get together again. After prom, they revisit the room where they had their first kiss.

In the epilogue, Tara and Darcy go interrailing together, Sahar is a solo artist, Michael has been accepted into the Ice Skating team for the Winter Olympic Games, Tao visits Elle in Berlin and Charlie visits Nick in Leeds.

== Cast ==
- Kit Connor as Nick Nelson
- Joe Locke as Charlie Spring
- William Gao as Tao Xu
- Yasmin Finney as Elle Argent
- Corinna Brown as Tara Jones
- Kizzy Edgell as Darcy Olsson
- Tobie Donovan as Isaac Henderson
- Jenny Walser as Tori Spring
- Rhea Norwood as Imogen Heaney
- Leila Khan as Sahar Zahid
- Fisayo Akinade as Mr. Ajayi
- Nima Taleghani as Mr. Farouk
- Jack Barton as David Nelson
- Darragh Hand as Michael Holden
- Anna Maxwell Martin as Sarah Nelson. Martin replaces Olivia Colman from the series.
- Eddie Marsan as Geoff Young
- Derek Jacobi as Pete

Additionally, reprising their roles from the series in minor or supporting capacity are Bradley Riches as student James McEwan, Ashwin Vishwanath, Evan Ovenell, Araloyin Oshunremi and Cormac Hyde-Corrin as Nick's rugby teammates Sai Verma, Christian McBride, Otis Smith and Harry Greene; Chetna Pandya and Alan Turkington as teachers Coach Singh and Mr. Lange; Georgina Rich and Joseph Balderrama as Charlie's parents Jane and Julio Spring; Thibault de Montalembert as Nick's father Stephane Nelson; Bel Priestley, Ash Self and Rebecca Root as Lambert students Naomi Russell and Felix Britten and Principal Edwards.

In new roles, Caleb Evers plays Alfie, a younger student Charlie helps against bullying, and Oliver Maltman plays Kenneth, Nick's boss at the dog shelter. Derek Jacobi's real-life partner Richard Clifford portrays his character Pete's partner.

Series creator and writer Alice Oseman appears as a passenger on a train to Leeds. Executive producer Patrick Walters cameos as a patron of the café that Charlie works at.

== Production ==
=== Development ===
Series creator Alice Oseman originally stated that she expected Heartstopper to run for four seasons to fully adapt the graphic novel series of the same name. Following the third season, the future of the programme became uncertain. This was reportedly because of a 30% drop in viewing figures from the preceding season and potential complications with contracts among the cast. Oseman and executive producer Patrick Walters said that they were working on acquiring a renewal.

On 22 April 2025, it was reported that Netflix opted to commission a feature-length film to serve as the series finale in lieu of a fourth season. The film was written by Oseman as an adaptation of the sixth and final volume in the graphic novel series, as well as the novella Nick and Charlie. Series stars Kit Connor and Joe Locke serve as executive producers. In July 2025, the title was revealed to be Heartstopper Forever.

=== Casting ===
Prior to the film being greenlit, both Connor and Locke expressed interest in returning for a fourth season of Heartstopper. Once it was confirmed, it was reported that both would reprise their roles as Nick and Charlie, respectively.

In April 2026, it was announced that Olivia Colman would not be returning as Sarah Nelson and that Anna Maxwell Martin had been recast in the role. The majority of the main cast including Yasmin Finney, William Gao, Corinna Brown, Kizzy Edgell, Tobie Donovan and Rhea Norwood were also confirmed, alongside Derek Jacobi as Pete, one half of an older couple whom Charlie meets while working in a cafe.

=== Filming ===
The film is directed by Wash Westmoreland. Principal photography began on 9 June 2025. Oseman said on 2 July that filming was over halfway completed. The cast announced online that filming had wrapped on 27 July.

== Release ==
Heartstopper Forever had its premiere at the Cineworld Leicester Square in London on 14 July 2026. The film was released internationally on Netflix on 17 July 2026.

== Reception ==
=== Critical response ===
The review aggregator website Rotten Tomatoes reported a 93% approval rating based on 44 reviews, with an average rating of 7.3/10. The website's critical consensus reads, "Heartstopper remains an essential cozy love story with room for maturity throughout this heartfelt end, arriving in a new format but staying true to its identity, characters, and purpose of showcasing love in all forms to enjoy Forever." Metacritic, which uses a weighted average, assigned a score of 67 out of 100 based on 10 critics, indicating "generally favorable" reviews.

Aramide Tinubu of Variety wrote that Hearstopper Forever is a "mature and elevated swan song, the movie delivers a fitting goodbye while giving fans a glimpse at the perfect epilogue". In a three out of five star review for The Guardian, deputy arts editor Owen Myers wrote that "sanitized sex scenes won’t let the Netflix lovebirds grow up", adding that "if it were up to Kit Connor, Heartstopper would have ended quite differently. 'If I’d had my way, I would have had Nick and Charlie cheating on each other and doing all those stupid things,' he recently told the Guardian. 'Because young people do that and don’t necessarily need to be villainized for it.' Midway through Heartstopper Forever, the film-length finale of Netflix’s series, I started to see his point. The central star-crossed lovebirds of Alice Oceman’s megahit are now 18 and 17, and like most teenagers they have sex, get drunk and fight with their annoying siblings. Unlike most people their age, they don’t vape, don’t use sex apps and they definitely don’t cheat."

=== Accolades ===
Accolades received by Heartstopper Forever
Award	Date of ceremony	Category	Recipient(s)	Result	Ref(s).
Queerties Awards	10 March 2026	Next Big Thing	Heartstopper Forever	Nominated	
