= William Gao =

English actor and musician

- 高鑫
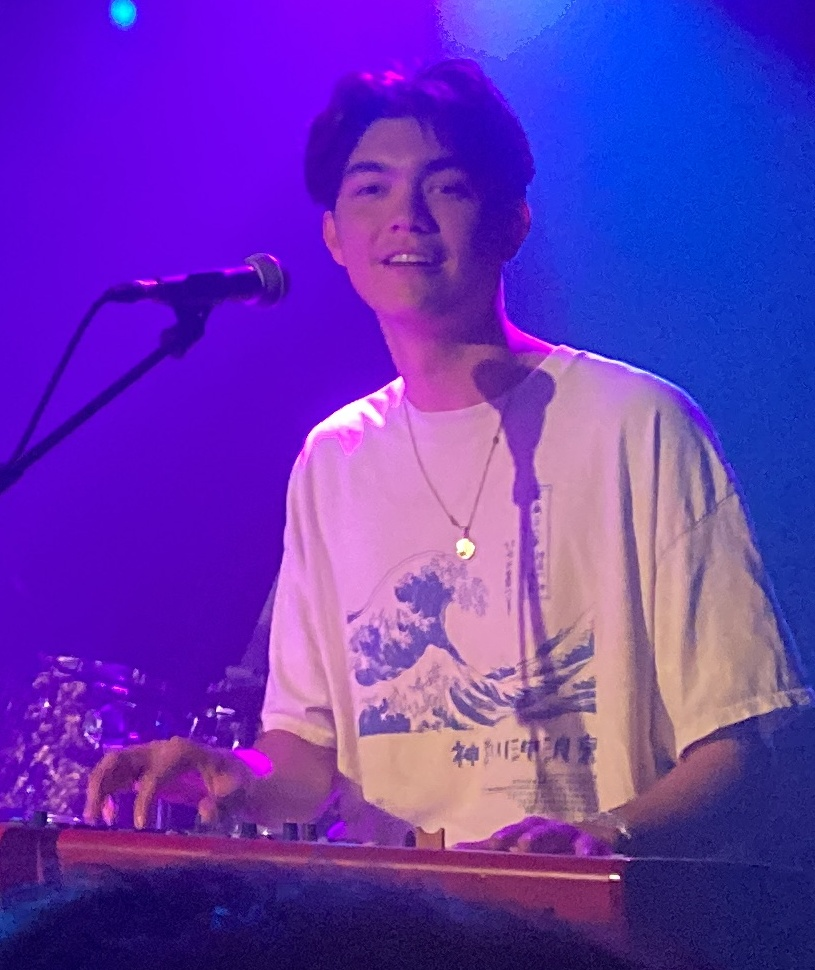
- Gao in 2023
- Born: 20 February 2003 (age 23)
- Occupations: Actor; musician
- Years active: 2016–present
- Musical career
- Instruments: Piano • keyboard
- Member of: Wasia Project

Chinese name
- Chinese: 高鑫
Transcriptions
Standard Mandarin
- Hanyu Pinyin: Gāo Xīn
- IPA: [káʊ ɕín]

William Gao Hardy (Chinese: 高鑫; pinyin: Gāo Xīn; born 20 February 2003) is an English actor and musician. He is known for his debut role as Tao Xu in the Netflix series Heartstopper (2022–2026), for which he was nominated for a Children's and Family Emmy Award for Outstanding Supporting Performance.

Gao and his younger sister Olivia Hardy formed a music duo called Wasia Project in 2019.

== Early life ==
Gao was born on 20 February 2003 and is from South Croydon. He is the son of an English father and a Chinese mother who emigrated to Britain in her twenties. He attended Trinity School, where he completed A Levels in Chinese, music and drama in 2022. He took up classical piano at the age of 11 and was a member of Trinity Boys Choir. He joined the National Youth Theatre in May 2019.

After finding a casting call on his youth theatre's website, Gao auditioned and was cast as the character of Tao Xu in Heartstopper.

== Filmography ==
=== Television ===
Year	Title	Role	Notes
2022–2024	Heartstopper	Tao Xu	Main role; 24 episodes

=== Film ===
Year	Title	Role
2024	Sunrise	Edward Loi
2025	Breakwater	Matt
2026	Heartstopper Forever	Tao Xu

=== Theatre ===
Year	Title	Role	Venue	Ref.
2016	Shakespeare at 400	Puck	Royal Festival Hall	
2016	A Midsummer Night's Dream	Cobweb	Glyndebourne	
2022	The Trials	Xander	Donmar Warehouse	

=== Music videos ===
Year	Title	Other artist	Director(s)
As lead artist
2023	"Petals on the Moon"	Wasia Project	Grace Pickering
2023	"Ur So Pretty"	Wasia Project	Quinn Lovero
2023	"Remember When"	Wasia Project	Will Gao and Olivia Hardy
2024	"Takes Me Back Home"	Wasia Project	Charlie & Charlie
2024	"Somebody Come Through"	Wasia Project	Charlie & Charlie
2024	"To Get Better"	Wasia Project	Charlie & Charlie
Guest appearances
2024	"Goddess"	Laufey	Celine Song

== Accolades ==
Award	Year	Category	Nominated work	Result	Ref.
Children's and Family Emmy Awards	2022	Outstanding Supporting Performance	Heartstopper	Nominated	
Gay Times Honours	2022	On Screen Trailblazer	Heartstopper	Won	
