= Thomas Headon =

Australian singer-songwriter

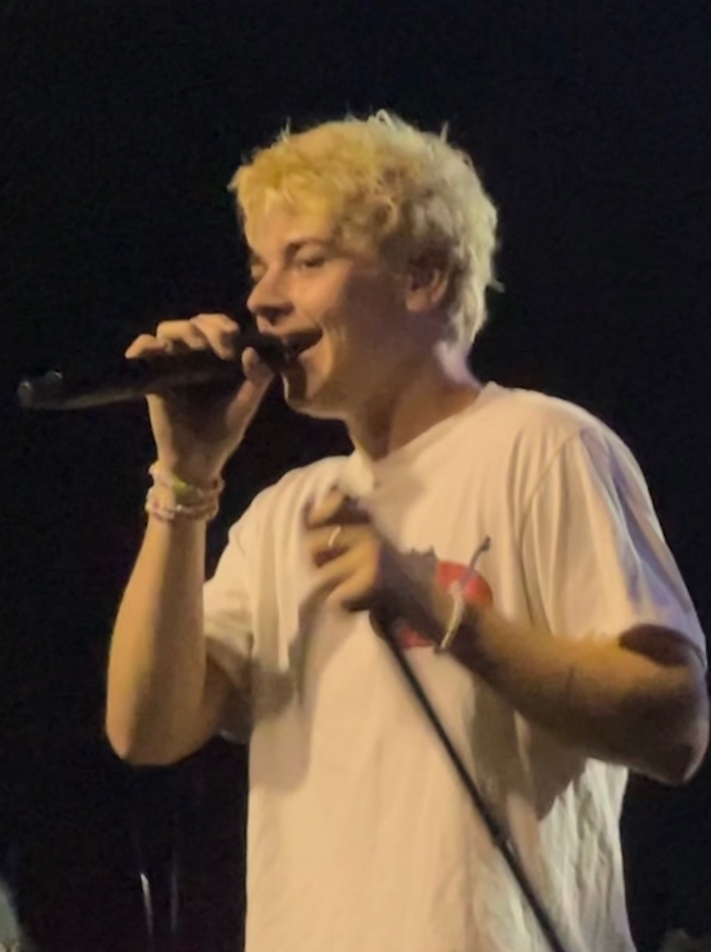
- Headon in 2023

Background information
- Born: Thomas William Frederick Headon; August 17, 2000 (age 26); London, England
- Origin: Melbourne, Australia
- Genres: Indie pop; alternative rock; bedroom pop
- Occupation: Singer-songwriter
- Instruments: Vocals; guitar
- Years active: 2019–present
- Label: Warner
- Website: www.thomasheadon.com

Thomas William Frederick Headon (born 17 August 2000) is a British-born Australian singer-songwriter based in London. He rose to prominence with his debut singles "Grace" and "Clean Me Up" which were released in 2019. As of May 2024, the songs have garnered 8 million and 17 million streams on Spotify respectively.

== Early life ==
Headon was born in London, England. His family moved to Traralgon, Australia when he was five years old. He started learning music and writing songs at the age of fourteen. Headon grew up in Australia, and moved back to London in 2019 to pursue a musical career. Prior to becoming a professional musician, Headon posted covers of songs on his YouTube channel.

== Musical career ==
=== 2019-2020: The Greatest Hits and The Goodbye ===
Headon's debut single "Grace" was released in September 2019., and this was followed by other songs including "Clean Me Up" in December 2019 and "Car Window" in February 2020. He released his debut EP, The Greatest Hits, in March 2020.

In June 2020, Headon released "Loving You". This was followed by "Focus" in July 2020 and "UrbanAngel1999" in September 2020. All three tracks featured on Headon's second EP, The Goodbye EP.

=== 2021-present: Victoria and Six Songs ===
In April 2021, Headon released "Bored" with Lizzy McAlpine.

Headon released his third EP, Victoria, in March 2022. It was preceded by the singles "Nobody Has to Know", "Strawberry Kisses", "How Do I Know?" and "Victoria". The EP peaked at number 23 on the British charts. The Official Charts Company named him as an artist to watch for 2022 and MTV highlighted him as one of their "Push" artists tipped for success. Thomas supported indie band Only the Poets on their 2022 summer tour of Europe. He is also due to support Sigrid on her European tour.

In June 2023, Headon announced the release of his fourth EP, Six Songs That Thomas Headon Likes and Thinks That You Would Like Too. It features the singles "Georgia", "I Loved a Boy" and "2009 Toyota".

== Musical style ==
Headon's sound mixes a variety of different genres including indie pop, lo-fi, and alternative. Headon himself remains uncommitted as to which genre he focuses on the most.

He cites artists such as Harry Styles, The 1975, and Coldplay as inspirations for his music.

== Discography ==
=== Extended plays ===
Title	Details	Peak chart positions
Title	Details	UK
The Greatest Hits	Released: 27 March 2020; Label: Thomas Headon; Format: Digital download	—
The Goodbye	Released: 25 September 2020; Label: Thomas Headon; Format: Digital download	—
Victoria	Released: 11 March 2022; Label: Warner; Format: Digital download, vinyl, CD	23
Six Songs That Thomas Headon Likes and Thinks That You Would Like Too	Released: 30 June 2023; Label: Such a Good Company; Format: Digital download, CD	—
Wasn't a Fighting Kid	Released: 25 October 2024; Label: Such a Good Company; Format: Digital download	—

=== Singles ===
==== As lead artist ====
List of singles as lead artist, showing year released and album name
Title	Year	Album
"Grace"	2019	The Greatest Hits
"Clean Me Up"	2019	The Greatest Hits
"Car Window"	2020	The Greatest Hits
"Loving You"	2020	The Goodbye EP
"Focus"	2020	The Goodbye EP
"UrbanAngel1999"	2020	The Goodbye EP
"Bored" (featuring Lizzy McAlpine)	2021	Non-album single
"Nobody Has to Know"	2021	Victoria
"Strawberry Kisses"	2021	Victoria
"How Do I Know?"	2022	Victoria
"Victoria"	2022	Victoria
"Georgia"	2022	Six Songs That Thomas Headon Likes and Thinks That You Would Like Too
"I Loved a Boy"	2023	Six Songs That Thomas Headon Likes and Thinks That You Would Like Too
"2009 Toyota"	2023	Six Songs That Thomas Headon Likes and Thinks That You Would Like Too
"Middle of the Night"	2024	Non-album single
"Panic"	2024	Wasn't a Fighting Kid

==== As featured artist ====
List of singles as featured artist, showing year released and album name
Title	Year	Album
"Not Even in Vegas" (G Flip featuring Thomas Headon)	2019	Non-album singles
"Dizzy" (Chloe Moriondo featuring Thomas Headon and Alfie Templeman)	2021	Non-album singles
