= Breakwater (2025 film) =

2025 film

Brekwater
- Directed by: Max Morgan
- Written by: Max Morgan
- Produced by: Jemima Chen
- Starring: Daniel McNamee; Shaun Paul McGarth; William Gao
- Release date: June 2025 (Raindance)
- Running time: 91 minutes
- Country: United Kingdom
- Language: English

Breakwater is a 2025 film written and directed by Max Morgan and produced by Jemima Chen. The film stars Daniel McNamee, Shaun Paul McGrath and William Gao.

== Synopsis ==
Set between the sandstone colleges of Oxford and the salt-encrusted Suffolk coast, Breakwater follows the tentative romance between university student, Otto, and retired angler, John. Their lives fuse irreversibly over the shared trauma of losing a loved one, however, their relationship darkens when the past exhumes itself in the form of guilt, grief, and ghosts.

== Production ==
Breakwater is Max Morgan's feature debut. It is the first feature film made by students at the University of Oxford since Privileged in 1982.

== Release ==
The film had its World Premiere at the 33rd Raindance Film Festival in June 2025, where it was nominated in five categories: Best UK Feature, Best Director, Best Debut Director, Best Performance, and Best Cinematography.

It received generally positive reviews, with praise for the script and performances of McNamee and McGrath. The Guardian described the film as a 'nicely judged debut feature'.

The film released in UK cinemas in May 2026 before streaming online.
