= Wasia Project =

English pop band

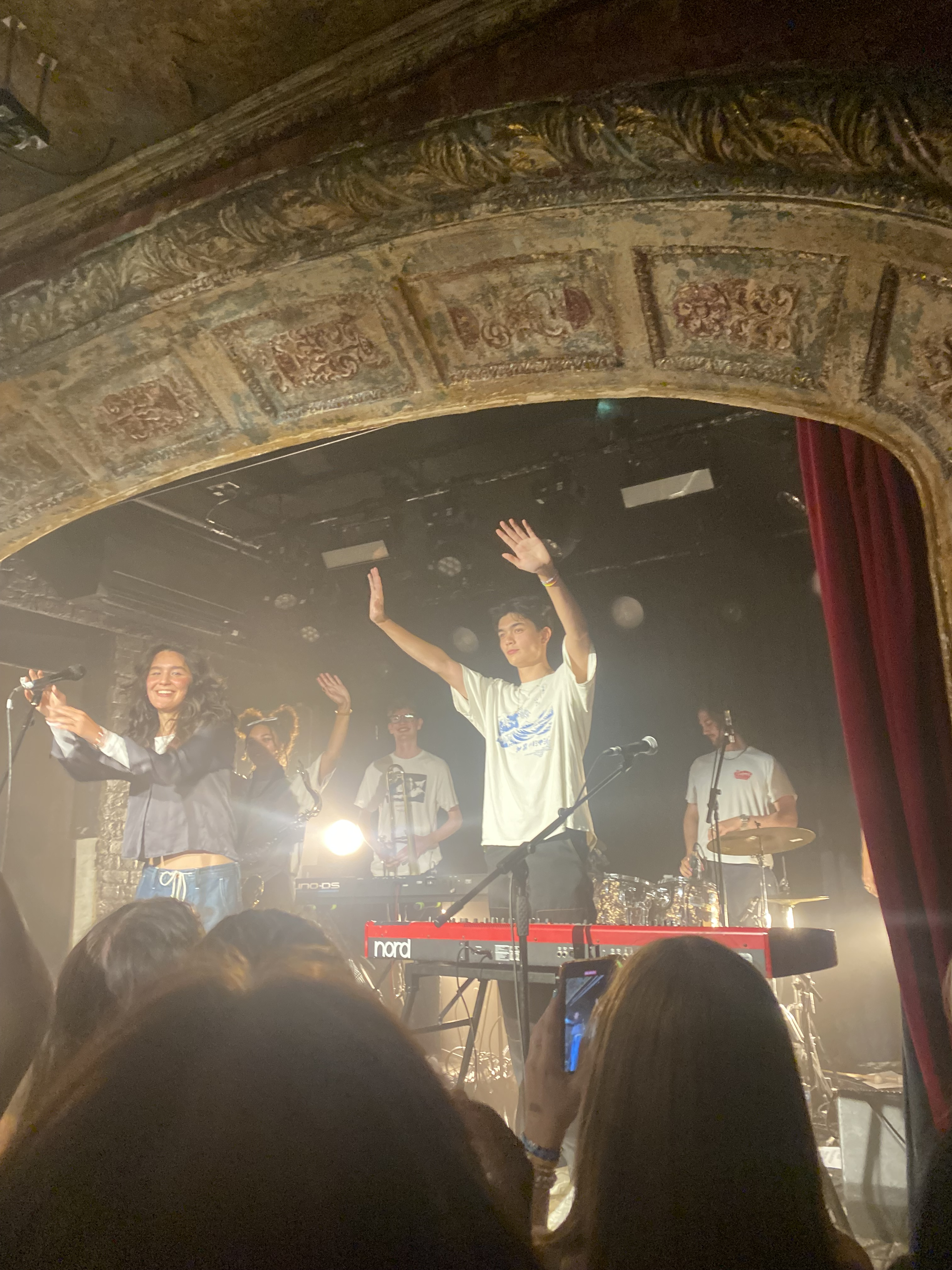

Background information
- Origin: England
- Genres: Indie pop; electronica; jazz pop; classical; bedroom pop
- Years active: 2019–present
- Labels: LaoLao Records; AWAL
- Members: Olivia Hardy; William Gao
- Website: wasiaproject.com

Wasia Project is an English indie pop band consisting of siblings Olivia Hardy and William Gao. The group released their debut single, "Why Don't U Love Me," in 2019. This was followed by their debut extended play (EP) How Can I Pretend? in 2022. In August 2024, they released their second extended play (EP), Isotope. On stage, they are often joined by drummer Nate Wicks, bassist Tom Pacitti, saxophonist Safi Jazz, and trombonist Patrick Minton.

== History ==
William Gao and Olivia Hardy are siblings of mixed Asian-British background. As a child, Hardy learned how to play the violin using the Suzuki method. Gao is a classically trained pianist. They formed a music duo called Wasia Project in 2019. The duo produces a blend of alt-pop and jazz fusions. In 2019, they uploaded their debut single, "Why Don't You Love Me" on SoundCloud.

Regarding the name, Gao shared on Substack the following:

When we created ‘wasia project’ as two sets of British Chinese siblings in 2019, we laughed about it. We thought ‘how funny would it be to call it ‘wasia project’ because we all have English dads and Chinese mums’. It was a way for us to put a name to who we were. In essence, to say what hadn’t been said...It was us trying to describe a feeling far more confusing and complex than we could comprehend at the time (Bear in mind we were between the ages of 14 and 16). 3 years later, when people started listening to our work, we decided to keep going with the name, and it began to feel more like a metaphor for our desire to bounce freely between genre’s [sic] in our creative work, which has always been important to us. Fusion is inherent in our work and inherent in ourselves, and WASIA PROJECT has always felt like a mantra to that.

Their first EP How Can I Pretend? was released in May 2022. The following year, they released the single, "Petals on the Moon" via LaoLao Records / AWAL. Its visual was videographed by Grace Pickering. The music video for "My Lover Is Sleeping" was illustrated and animated by Patrick Atkins. In 2023, their song, "Ur So Pretty", was included on the soundtrack for the second season of Heartstopper. In 2024, they completed their first UK headline tour, followed by a European tour supporting Tom Odell. Additionally, they also completed their first US tour supporting Laufey in April 2024.

In August 2024, they released their second EP titled "Isotope." Then, they embarked on a headlining tour in support of the EP in North America and Europe, beginning on 18 September in Hamburg and concluding in Birmingham on 19 November. The duo's debut album, Nocturne, released on 18 September 2026. In July 2026, the film Heartstopper Forever was released and included "Whale Call" on the film's soundtrack.

== Band members ==
- Olivia Hardy – lead vocals, guitar, violin
- William Gao – keyboards, piano, backing vocals

=== Touring musicians ===
- Luca Wade – drums, percussion (2021–2025)
- Tom Pacitti – bass guitar (2022–present)
- Safi Jazz – saxophone (2022-2025)
- Patrick Minton – trombone (2023–2025)
- Nate Wicks (2026-present)

== Discography ==
=== Studio albums ===
List of studio albums
Title	Details	Peak chart positions
Title	Details	UK
Nocturne	Released: 18 September 2026; Label: LaoLao Records	80

=== Extended plays ===
List of extended plays
Title	Details
How Can I Pretend?	Released: 10 May 2022; Label: LaoLao Records
Isotope	Released: 29 August 2024; Label: LaoLao Records

=== Singles ===
List of singles
Title	Year	Album
"Why Don't U Love Me"	2019	How Can I Pretend?
"Burning Eyes R Calling"	2020	Non-album singles
"U Deserve"	2020	Non-album singles
"Misfit Biscuit"	2020	Non-album singles
"My Vine"	2022	Non-album singles
"Petals on the Moon"	2023	Non-album singles
"My Lover Is Sleeping"	2023	Non-album singles
"Remember When"	2023	Non-album singles
"Is This What Love Is?"	2024	Isotope
"Takes Me Back Home"	2024	Isotope
"Letters from the Day"	2025	Non-album single
"2515"	2026	Nocturne
"Bleeding Gold"	2026	Nocturne
"Whale Call"	2026	Nocturne
"Vogue"	2026	Nocturne
