= Corinna Brown =

English actress

- Born: London, England
- Education: East 15 Acting School
- Occupation: Actress
- Years active: 2012–present

Corinna Brown is an English actress. She is best known for her role as Tara Jones in the Netflix series Heartstopper (2022–2024) and the 2026 film Heartstopper Forever.

== Life and career ==
Brown was born in the East London Borough of Waltham Forest. She began performing as a child, enrolling in Saturday dance and later musical theatre classes at the local Anna Fiorentini Theatre and Film School. Through this, she performed in variety shows at the Hackney Empire and was signed to their agency books. Brown also performed with the Royal Academy of Dramatic Art's youth company. She acted in commercials and made her television debut in the 2012 BBC Three film My Murder with John Boyega. She also appeared in the Disney Channel spin-off Even More Evermoor.

Brown enrolled at East 15 Acting School, graduating in 2020. She specialised in acting and stage combat. Afterwards, she was signed to MacFarlane Chard.

After graduating from drama school, Brown played Swanhilde in Coppélia at the New Vic Theatre. She then returned to television when she was cast in the main role of Tara Jones in the Netflix adaptation of Alice Oseman's Heartstopper. The first season aired in 2022, the second season aired in 2023, and the third season aired in 2024. She also made a guest appearance as Chelsea Craig in an episode of the British medical soap opera Doctors.

== Filmography ==
=== Television ===
Year	Title	Role	Notes	Ref.
2012	My Murder	Nashauna	Television film	
2017	Daphne	Girl on Bus	Minor role	
2020	The Show Must Go Online	Messala, 5th Plebian	1 episode	
2022	Doctors	Chelsea Craig	1 episode	
2022–2024	Heartstopper	Tara Jones	Main role; 24 episodes	
2025	In Flight	Kayla Brown	2 episodes	
2025	The Summer I Turned Pretty	Gemma	Guest role	

=== Film ===
Year	Title	Role
2026	Heartstopper Forever	Tara Jones

== Stage ==
Year	Title	Role	Notes
2021	Coppélia	Swanhilde	New Vic Theatre, Newcastle-under-Lyme
2025	Noughts and Crosses	Sephy	Regent’s Park Open Air Theatre, London
