= Baby Queen =

South African-British singer (born 1997)

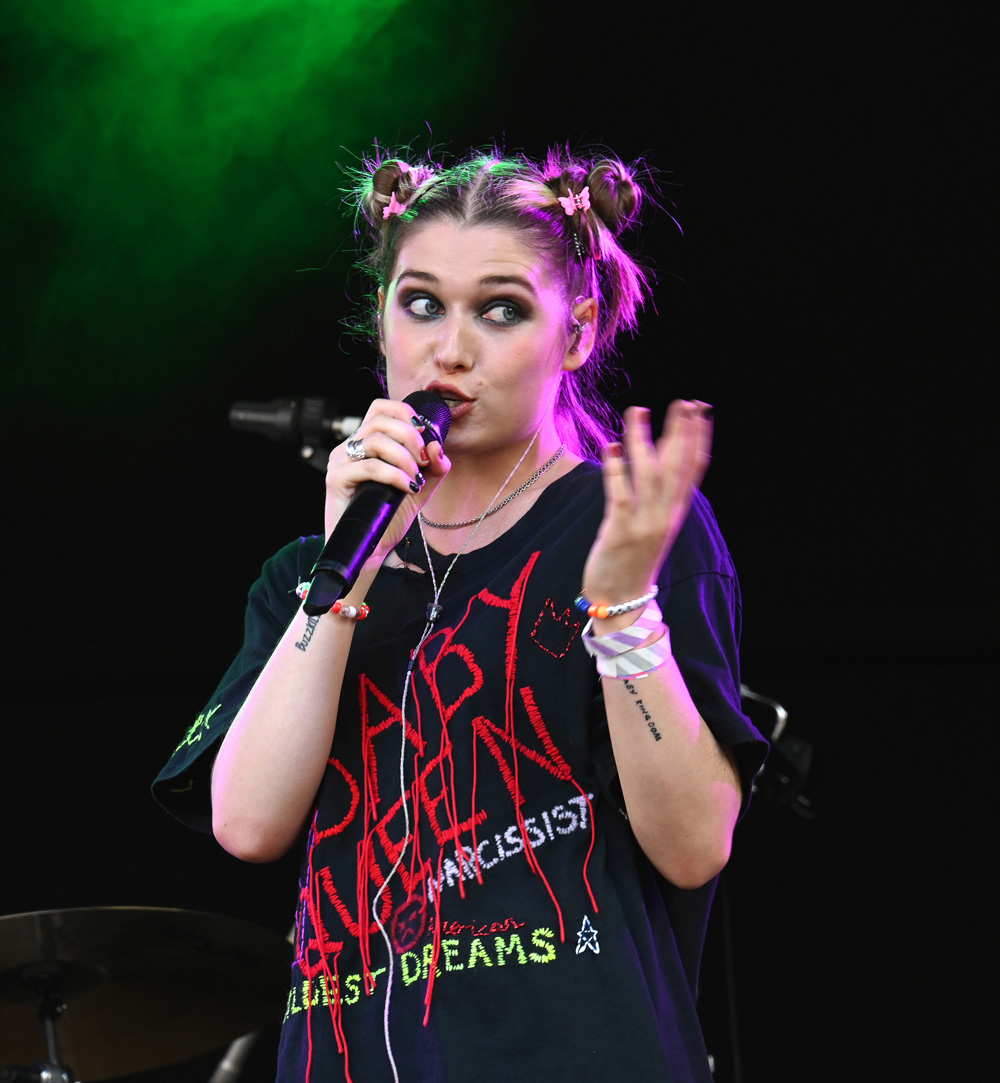
- Latham performing in 2021
- Born: Arabella Sarah Lennox Latham; 19 August 1997 (age 29); Durban, South Africa
- Other name: Bella Latham
- Citizenship: United Kingdom
- Occupation: Singer
- Years active: 2020–present
- Musical career
- Origin: London, England
- Genre: Alternative pop
- Instrument: Vocals
- Labels: Polydor; Universal
- Website: babyqueen.world

Arabella Sarah Lennox Latham (born 19 August 1997), known professionally as Baby Queen, is a South African-born British singer based in London. Born and raised in Durban, she moved to London at 18 to pursue a career in music and signed a recording contract with Polydor Records in 2020.

Her first EP, Medicine, was released in November 2020, followed by her debut mixtape, The Yearbook, in September 2021. She made the long list for the Radio 1 Sound of 2022. Her debut studio album, Quarter Life Crisis, was released in November 2023.

== Early life ==
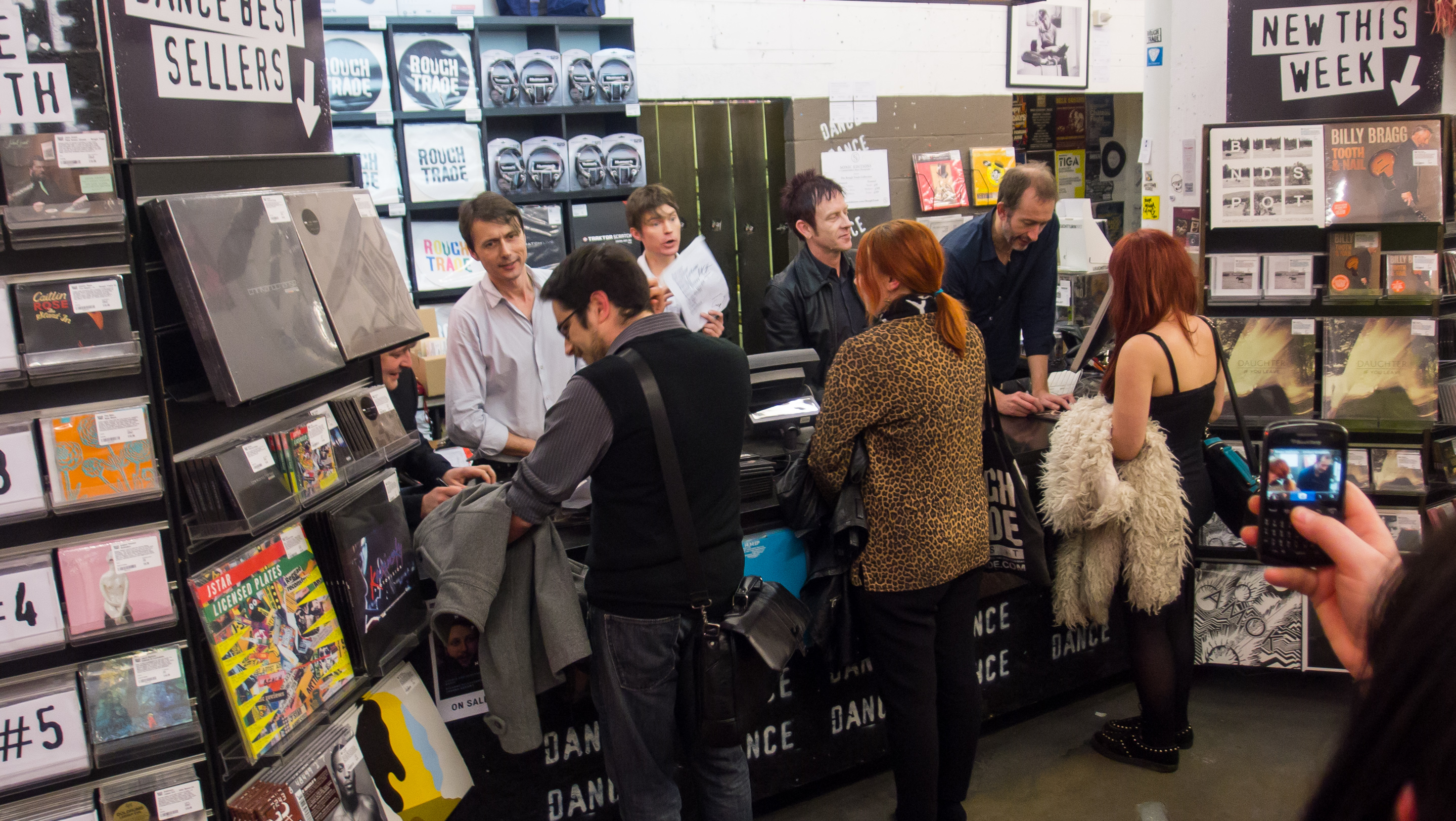
Rough Trade East, Brick Lane, London where Latham worked until 2020 (photo March 2013)

Latham was born and brought up in Durban, South Africa. Her father owns an art supply company, while also operating a small art gallery located above this shop. Latham claims her upbringing in South Africa has contributed to her confident personality and the loudness of her Baby Queen persona.

At 18, with her parents' blessing, Latham emigrated to London in order to pursue her music career. Initially living with her aunt in Fulham, Latham would move out and become immersed in the city's nightlife. During this time, Latham says she developed issues with substance abuse, using drugs to counteract her depression. It was after what she describes as a "horrific night in East London" following a break-up in 2017 that Latham would write "the first ever Baby Queen song", the stream-of-consciousness style "Raw Thoughts". The song allegedly took only 20 minutes to write and would set the precedent for Latham's self-proclaimed lyrical openness and "uncomfortably honest" attitude towards the topics of drug use and mental health.

Latham admits to having unrealistic expectations about the ease of getting a record deal in London, a city with a much more flourishing music industry than her South-African hometown. She recounts her initial plans of "making it" by knocking on music labels' doors with her mixtapes. Despite initial setbacks, Latham would continue writing songs while working at Rough Trade East record shop in Brick Lane, London. She worked at Rough Trade from 2019 until 2020 and the COVID-19 pandemic. Latham recalls jotting lyrics on post-it notes during her shifts, collating them in what became known as "Bella's Wall" in the staff room. Latham also worked as a waitress at the Brit Awards, hoping erroneously to network with the attending celebrities. It would take six years living in London before Latham would sign to Polydor Records over Zoom in 2020.

== Career ==
=== 2015–2020: Career beginnings ===
Latham discovered her songwriting abilities by the age of 11 or 12. She arrived in London in 2015 with around 40 demo CDs which she had written during her teenage years in South Africa. The first song written for the Baby Queen project, "Raw Thoughts", was composed following a breakup in 2017. From 2019 onwards, Latham continued writing songs while working at Rough Trade East. In early 2020, amidst lockdown due to the COVID-19 pandemic, she left Rough Trade and signed to Polydor Records.

=== 2020: Medicine ===
After signing to record label Polydor, Latham's first EP, Medicine, was released on 11 November 2020. The first track to be written for the EP was "Buzzkill", which was completed in 2018. The remaining tracks were allegedly written between late 2019 and early 2020, which resulted in much of the EP's production happening remotely during the COVID-19 pandemic. Latham claims that she co-wrote "Pretty Girl Lie" with her producer over Zoom in 2020, and that the vocals for "Medicine, "Want Me" and "Online Dating" were all recorded in a makeshift studio in her bedroom due to lockdown.

The songs "Internet Religion", "Buzzkill", "Pretty Girl Lie", "Want Me" and the title track "Medicine" were promoted as singles. Each track was accompanied by an official music video and lyric video released on YouTube in the months leading up to Medicine's release. The only remaining non-single on the EP, "Online Dating", received a hybrid lyric and music video entitled "Online Dating (Baby Kingdom)" on 11 November, the day of the EP's release. "Baby Kingdom" is the term given to Latham's fans.

During the promotion of Medicine, Latham also periodically uploaded covers to her YouTube channel. Songs covered during this time period include "I Don't Want To Get Over You" by The Magnetic Fields, "Mirrorball" by Taylor Swift and "Halloween" by Phoebe Bridgers.

On 1 December 2020, Latham released a cover of the classic Christmas carol "Santa Baby". Latham was inspired to cover a Christmas song by the childhood memory of her dad's Christmas mixtape, and she explains her choice of "Santa Baby" by the fact that its "cheeky and satirical lyrics" align with the rest of her discography and persona. The single was not attached to an album and received minimal promotion, with no music or lyric video.

=== 2021: The Yearbook ===
Latham's debut mixtape, The Yearbook, was released on 3 September 2021. The songs "Raw Thoughts", "These Drugs", "Dover Beach", "American Dream", featuring Australian singer-songwriter May-a, and "You Shaped Hole" were promoted as singles leading up to The Yearbook's release. While all singles received music videos on YouTube, only "Raw Thoughts", "These Drugs" and "Dover Beach" also received lyric videos. The track "Narcissist" was promoted as a single after the album's release, with a music video uploaded to YouTube on 8 October 2021. "You Shaped Hole" was also included in the FIFA 22 soundtrack. Her single "Dover Beach" was inspired by her time writing music in Dover after having been initially motivated to go there while reading the poem "Dover Beach" by Matthew Arnold.

=== 2022–2023: Heartstopper and Quarter Life Crisis ===
The single "Wannabe" was released on 10 November 2021, accompanied by a music video on YouTube.

Her next single, "Colours of You", was released on 22 April 2022. The track was used to promote the Netflix series Heartstopper, with a series of videos featuring the cast with Baby Queen posted on the social media platform TikTok. She made her acting debut in the final episode of the second season of the show, performing as a singer at the prom.

Two additional singles have since been released. "Nobody Really Cares" and "LAZY" were both previewed on social media, as well as being part of Latham's live shows. Her song "LAZY" was featured in the Growing Together Expansion Pack on the alternative radio station in The Sims 4, where Latham sang the song in simlish.

Latham provided musical support during the Europe and UK leg of Olivia Rodrigo's SOUR tour in June and July 2022. Latham has said that in the time immediately prior to being contacted by Rodrigo with the offer to join the tour, she was considering quitting her musical career.

On 19 March 2023, Latham uploaded a video to TikTok, where she was in a music studio, dancing to music. It was speculated that the audio is actually a demo for a new song, with the caption "#newmusic". The song included the lyrics ‘Dream Girl’ and it was speculated this was the name of the song.

On 2 May 2023, she uploaded an official music video of the song "These Drugs" onto YouTube. This would be the sixth music video to accompany songs from The Yearbook.

On 19 May 2023, Baby Queen announced on her Instagram account that "Dream Girl" would be released on 9 June 2023 as the lead single from her upcoming debut album.

On 20 July 2023, Baby Queen released "We Can Be Anything" as the second single from the album. It was later announced that this song would be a part of the soundtrack for EA Sports FC 24, which released 22 September 2023.

On 10 August 2023, Baby Queen released "All the Things" as the third single. She also announced the title of her debut album, Quarter Life Crisis, which was set to be released on 6 October 2023.

On 6 September 2023, Latham announced that the title track "Quarter Life Crisis" would be the fourth single to support the build-up to her debut album, Quarter Life Crisis. This song, released on 8 September 2023, was accompanied by a music video which was later released in the day. The album was initially going to be named kid genius, another track in the album, but was changed after her mother's urging.

On 12 September 2023 Baby Queen posted on her Instagram account saying that the album release would be moved back to 10 November 2023. The reasons for this are unknown.

=== 2024–present: I Hope You Don't Remember Me ===
On 10 February 2024, Latham posted on Instagram a snippet of a video of her working on upcoming music. Since then, she has been posting hints of new music and stating she is setting herself a new year's resolution to create a new album this year.

On 1 March 2024, Latham announced the title of her new single, "Ride Or Die", which came out later in March. The announcement was shared by a snippet of the song's supposed chorus.

On 30 January 2026, she released the single "I Hope You Don't Remember Me", written during her period of transition from living in London to New York and then Los Angeles, which Latham described as "about an urge to revoke my memory from somebody else's mind after perceived rejection (partly in defiance and partly out of shame), and have them be erased from my own in return". The song is a product of her collaboration with the producer Alex Casnoff, and was the first release of her second album, I Hope You Don't Remember Me, released on 24 July 2026 via Insanity Records. Latham described her second album as "a story about love, rejection, ego and shame told by an unreliable narrator whose understanding of love is warped", and said that the making of the album "was the closest I've come to finding some sort of faith in myself."

== Artistry ==
=== Influences ===
Latham cites her earliest influences as the artists she grew up listening to, such as Fleetwood Mac and the Beatles. She recalls a home video of herself, three years of age and dancing to Madonna's "Like a Virgin". The first CD Latham bought herself was the Twilight soundtrack. Her first concert was Lady Gaga's The Monster Ball Tour in Cape Town, an experience she describes as "electrifying". Taylor Swift was the first artist Latham had found and started listening to on her own, separate from her parents' influence. Latham cites Swift as the inspiration behind her entire career path. She recounts watching the music video for "Love Story" at age 12 and having a moment of realisation that, in Latham's words, "this is what I'm doing". "Love Story" remains Latham's go-to karaoke song. She is still an avid Swift fan, stating that her ultimate goal is to "drink wine with Taylor Swift and sing a song at the Grammys". Latham does, however, admit that her childhood obsession with the singer resulted in her earlier songs, written in her teen years in South Africa, defaulting to "really Americanised country-pop music".

Latham identifies a drastic shift in her music taste after moving to London and experiencing mental health issues as well as other hardships. It was around this time she started listening to "super emo music". Latham claims she owes the '90s-rock undertone of some of her songs to artists such as Courtney Love, the Smashing Pumpkins and Nine Inch Nails.

Latham describes her work as anti-pop, a genre she defines as the sound of a generation that is "sick and fucking tired of it". She likens herself to Billie Eilish, Melanie Martinez and Clairo in that she subverts the "bubblegum pop girl" stereotype of previous decades of pop music. Latham states that the artists she talks about most with her producer, King Ed, are St. Vincent, Sharon Van Etten, Anna Calvi and MGMT. In terms of her lyricism, Latham cites Swift, the 1975, Kae Tempest, and Lorde as major influences. Latham is also specifically a fan of the lyricism of Matty Healy, vocalist and guitarist in the band the 1975. Healy visited Latham on the set of the "Buzzkill" music video after their mutual stylist found out Latham was a fan.

== Gameplay with Baby Queen ==
On 7 November 2021, Latham announced her new gaming show "Gameplay with Baby Queen" on Instagram and Twitter. The same day, the first volume of the show was broadcast to BBC Sounds. "Gameplay with Baby Queen" focuses on video game soundtracks and features music selected by Latham herself. Each episode is an hour long and is available online for 30 days after being uploaded. The first volume included songs from The Legend of Zelda, Sable, and Red Dead Redemption 2. The second instalment was uploaded on 20 November 2021 and included tracks from Chrono Trigger, The Last of Us, and The Witcher 3: Wild Hunt.

== Personal life ==
Latham has publicly stated that she does not define her sexuality. She describes experiencing stigma towards her sexual ambiguity growing up in South Africa, where queer identities are still not widely visible or considered acceptable. Even after moving to London, Latham recalls the "biphobic rhetoric" of some people she would meet.

Latham's attraction to women is often expressed in her lyrics. The song "Raw Thoughts" was dubbed a "bi anthem" by fans after Latham revealed that the lyrics were about a woman. Latham cites her attraction to Jodie Comer from Killing Eve as the inspiration behind "Want Me". The track was used as the opening song for the coming-of-age LGBT series Heartstopper (2022). The track "American Dream" features openly queer Australian singer-songwriter May-a and describes a "childlike crush" that exists purely in one's mind. Although the lyrics are gender neutral, the accompanying music video features Latham playing a waitress, daydreaming about a female customer at the café where she works. Latham's experiences with homophobia also inspire her songwriting. She cites her attraction to women as one reason she was deemed a "loser" or a "wannabe" by school bullies. These childhood experiences informed the "underdog anthem", "Wannabe", in which Latham proudly embraces these titles.

Throughout her discography, Latham has also described her struggles with eating disorders and depression as a child, as well as her unhealthy relationship with drugs since moving to London. "Pretty Girl Lie", a song which discusses issues with the performative nature of social media and the internet, was inspired partially by the body dysmorphia Latham experienced growing up. In "These Drugs", the track which Latham claims is her most personal release to date, she describes her disastrous mental health and reliance on drugs at a point in time when she was not seeking help for her depression. The song "Medicine" acts as a sequel and details Latham's complicated relationship with antidepressants, which she has been taking on and off since age 16. As a general rule, Latham admits she takes issue with songs that lack honesty or raw emotion, and strives to transmit her deep personal struggles, along with her dark and satirical personality in her own lyricism.

Latham has ADHD, which has been referenced in articles, interviews and the lyrics of her song "Online Dating".

== Discography ==
=== Studio albums ===
List of albums, with release date, selected chart positions, and album name shown
Title	Details	Peak chart positions
Title	Details	UK
Quarter Life Crisis	Released: 10 November 2023; Label: Polydor; Formats: CD, LP, digital download, streaming, cassette	5
I Hope You Don't Remember Me	Released: 24 July 2026; Label: Insanity; Formats: CD, LP, digital download, streaming, cassette	56

=== Mixtapes ===
Title	Details
The Yearbook	Released: 3 September 2021; Label: Polydor; Formats: CD, LP, DL, streaming, cassette

=== Extended plays ===
Title	Details
Medicine	Released: 11 November 2020; Label: Polydor; Formats: LP, DL, streaming, cassette

=== Singles ===
Title	Year	Album
"Internet Religion"	2020	Medicine
"Buzzkill" (Note: Included on the deluxe version of Quarter Life Crisis.)	2020	Medicine
"Pretty Girl Lie"	2020	Medicine
"Want Me"	2020	Medicine
"Medicine"	2020	Medicine
"Santa Baby"	2020	Non-album single
"Raw Thoughts"	2021	The Yearbook
"These Drugs"	2021	The Yearbook
"Dover Beach"	2021	The Yearbook
"American Dream" (with May-a)	2021	The Yearbook
"You Shaped Hole"	2021	The Yearbook
"Narcissist"	2021	The Yearbook
"Wannabe"	2021	Non-album single
"Colours of You"	2022	Quarter Life Crisis
"Nobody Really Cares"	2022	Quarter Life Crisis
"Lazy"	2022	Non-album single
"Dream Girl"	2023	Quarter Life Crisis
"We Can Be Anything"	2023	Quarter Life Crisis
"All the Things"	2023	Quarter Life Crisis
"Quarter Life Crisis"	2023	Quarter Life Crisis
"23"	2023	Quarter Life Crisis
"I Can’t Get My Shit Together"	2023	Quarter Life Crisis
"Ride or Die"	2024	Non-album single
"I Hope You Don't Remember Me"	2026	I Hope You Don't Remember Me
"Feel Something"	2026	I Hope You Don't Remember Me
"Word Vomit"	2026	I Hope You Don't Remember Me
"Permanently Obsessed"	2026	I Hope You Don't Remember Me
"The Protagonist"	2026	I Hope You Don't Remember Me

=== Notes ===
All music released in 2026 and onwards is released under the insanity records label instead of Polydor now.

== Tours ==
=== Headlining ===
- UK Tour (April 2022)
- Baby Queen’s Bedroom Sessions (September–October 2023)
- The Quarter Life Crisis Tour (October–November 2023)
- I Hope You Don't Remember Me Record Store Tour (July 2026)

=== Supporting ===
- The Weird Time of Life Tour (virtual tour, with Yungblud) (2020)
- SOUR Tour (Olivia Rodrigo) (2022) (UK + Europe dates)
- Superache Tour (Conan Gray) (2022) (United States dates)
