= Colours of You =

Single by Baby Queen

from the album Quarter Life Crisis (Deluxe)
- Released: 22 April 2022
- Length: 4:15
- Label: Polydor; Universal
- Songwriters: Baby Queen; Edward James Carlile
- Producer: King Ed

Baby Queen singles chronology
"Wannabe" (2021)	"Colours of You" (2022)	"Nobody Really Cares" (2022)

"Colours of You" is a song by British singer-songwriter Baby Queen. It was released on 22 April 2022 through Polydor Records and was originally composed for the Heartstopper soundtrack. The song features on the deluxe edition of Baby Queen's full-length debut studio album Quarter Life Crisis (2023). The song was written for the character Nick Nelson in Heartstopper when he discovers his bisexuality.

Baby Queen was asked by Heartstopper author Alice Oseman to write a song specifically from the point of view of Nelson's character and his understanding of his sexual identity. Baby Queen said, "To be asked to be a part of a story as beautiful and culturally important as Alice Oseman's Heartstopper was unbelievable, and still feels completely surreal."

In 2023, a 7-inch pink splatter vinyl of "Colours of You" was made and limited to 1,000 copies for Record Store Day 2023 in the United Kingdom. Side A consisted of "Colours of You", and Side B featured a stripped-piano version of Baby Queen's single "Lazy".

== Track listing ==
7-inch vinyl
No.	Title	Lyrics	Music	Length
1.	"Colours of You"	Arabella Latham; Edward James Carlile	King Ed	4:15
2.	"Lazy" (piano version)	Arabella Latham; Carlile; Jack Leonard; Jonathon Biggs	King Ed	3:26
Total length:				7:41

== Charts ==
Chart performance for "Colours of You"
Chart (2023)	Peak position
UK Vinyl Singles (OCC)	4
