= Adiescar Chase =

English multi-instrumentalist and composer

- Origin: Bedford, England
- Occupations: Multi-instrumentalist; composer
- Website: adiescar.com
- Education: Guildhall School of Music and Drama; National Film and Television School

Adiescar Chase is an English multi-instrumentalist and composer. She composed the soundtrack of the Netflix series, Heartstopper.

== Early life and education ==
Adiescar is from Bedford, England. Without her knowledge, her mother enrolled her in the "Sound and Music Summer School" course at the Purcell School for Young Musicians. This sparked Adiescar's interest composing for film and TV. She graduated first class B.mus (Hons) degree in composition at the Guildhall School of Music and Drama in 2017. She earned a master's degree in Composition for Film and Television at the National Film and Television School in 2021.

== Career ==
Adiescar is a multi-instrumentalist and composer. In 2021, she did composition work for the documentary, Between the Trees. She sound sampled the face of a leaf, converting the data into an electronic sound. Adiescar worked on the BBC series, Waterloo Road.

Adiescar composed the official soundtrack of seasons one and two of the Netflix series, Heartstopper. For season one, she worked chronologically and completed each episode's sound in approximately one-to-two weeks. She felt particularly connected to the show due to her bisexuality. She composed the score and employed electronic riffs to give it a contemporary feel. Heartstopper marked her first project after graduating from the National Film and Television School. She read the webcomic prior to composing and was given direction to have her music complement the pre-existing songs used. She would play chords on her keyboard, then add riffs on a synthesiser, then add sound effects. Some of the tracks, including the titular one, aided the "Heartstopper moments" by further emphasizing the feeling of electricity and excitement. Variations of the main character's Nick and Charlie's "First Sight" music were used whenever a character meets someone for the first time. Ben's theme, "X", incorporates slapping sounds to mirror "how his attitude slaps you in the face." For series 2, Adiescar rearranged some previous tracks and made new ones. In the finale featuring Tara and Darcy, she recorded her singing to represent comfort. She bought a new synthesizer specifically for season two.

In 2023, Adiescar collaborated with French composer Jean-Michel Jarre on the track "Synthy Sisters Take Two," a reworked version of "Synthy Sisters" from Jarre's 2022 album Oxymore. In 2024, Adiescar, along with Claude Samard Polikar, accompanied Jarre at several events, including the Starmus Festival concert in Bratislava, the Les Francofolies de La Rochelle concert on the French National Day, and the closing ceremony of the Paralympic Games.

== Discography ==
=== Albums ===
List of albums
Title	Details
Heartstopper (Soundtrack from the Netflix Series)	Released: 22 April 2022; Label: Maisie Music Publishing, LLC.
Heartstopper: Season 2 (Soundtrack from the Netflix Series)	Released: 28 July 2023; Label: Netflix Music, LLC.
Heartstopper: Season 3 (Soundtrack from the Netflix Series)	Released: 4 October 2024; Label: Netflix Music, LLC.
