= List of compositions by Gustav Holst =

Below is a sortable list of compositions by Gustav Holst. The works are categorized by genre, H. catalogue number (A Thematic Catalogue of Gustav Holst's Music by Imogen Holst, London, Faber Music Ltd., 1974), opus number, date of composition and title.

Genre	H.	Opus	Date	Title	Scoring	Notes
Opera			1892	Lansdown Castle or The Sorcerer of Tewkesbury		Operetta in the style of Gilbert and Sullivan
Opera	7	1	1895	The Revoke		Opera in 1 act; libretto by Fritz Hart
Opera	21		1896	The Idea		Children's Operetta
Opera	60	11	1902	The Youth's Choice		Musical Idyll in 1 act; libretto by the composer
Opera	89	23	1899–1906	Sita		Opera in 3 acts based on the story of Rama and Sita from the Ramayana; not performed until October 2024.
Opera	96	25	1908	Sāvitri		Chamber Opera in 1 act; libretto by the composer based on the episode of Savitri and Satyavan from the Mahābhārata
Opera	150	39	1918–22	The Perfect Fool		Comic Opera in 1 act; libretto by the composer; revised as a ballet 1922
Opera	156	42	1924	At the Boar's Head		Opera in 1 act; libretto by the composer based on William Shakespeare's Henry IV, Part 1 and Part 2
Opera	176	50	1929–30	The Wandering Scholar		Chamber Opera in 1 act; libretto by Clifford Bax founded on an incident in Helen Waddell's The Wandering Scholars.
Ballet	149		1921	The Lure, or The Moth and the Flame		
Ballet	150	39	1918–22	The Perfect Fool		1922 revision of the opera; libretto by the composer
Ballet	163	45/1	1926	The Golden Goose		Choral Ballet; for chorus and orchestra; founded on the tale of the Brothers Grimm, adapted by Jane M. Joseph
Ballet	164	45/2	1926–27	The Morning of the Year		Choral Ballet; for chorus and orchestra; words by Steuart Wilson. This was the first composition ever commissioned by the BBC.
Incidental music			1905	Stratford Revels		
Incidental music	94		1905	Nabou, or Kings in Babylon		
Incidental music	101	27a	1909	The Vision of Dame Christian: 1. Prelude; 2. First Chorus: "Knowest thou not the warning" 3. Hymn: "Oh let us render thanks to God above" 4. Choral Dance: "How shall we tell of him" 5. Finale		Masque; music for the play by Frances Ralph Gray
Incidental music	102	27b	1909	Stepney Children's Pageant	for orchestra	
Incidental music	102a	27b	1909	A Song of London	for unison chorus and piano	from the incidental music for Stepney Children's Pageant; words by G.K. Menzies
Incidental music	114		1910	The Praise of King Olaf: 1. Trumpet Calls; 2. First Battle Music; 3. The Raven Song; 4. Biarkamal; 5. Second Battle Music; 6. The Praise of King Olaf	for chorus and military band	Part 1 Scene 4 of The Pageant of London
Incidental music	122		1914	Philip the King		Incidental Music to the play by John Masefield
Incidental music	143		1918	The Sneezing Charm: 1. Prelude; 2. Song; 3. Ballet	for mezzo-soprano and orchestra	
Incidental music	146		1920	7 Choruses from the Alcestis of Euripides: 1. O Paian Wise!; 2. Daughter of Pelias, Fare Thee Well; 3. Oh, a House That Loves the Stranger; 4. Ah Me! Farewell; 5. Advance, Advance; 6. I Have Sojourned in the Muses' Land; 7. There Be Many Shapes of Mystery	for unison voices, 3 flutes and harp	for the play by Euripides in translation by Gilbert Murray
Incidental music			1921	St. Martin's Pageant		
Incidental music	170		1927	The Coming of Christ: 1. First Song of the Host of Heaven; 2. Song of the Four Angels; 3. Second Song of the Host of Heaven; 4. First Song of the Kings; 5. Second Song of the Kings; 6. The Antiphonal; 7. The Song of the Coming of Christ	for soprano, tenor, baritone, bass, mixed chorus, trumpet, piano, organ and string orchestra ad libitum	Incidental music for a Mystery Play
Incidental music	180		1930	The Passing of the Essenes: 2 Chants: 1. In the Lord Put I My Trust; 2. All the Powers of the Lord	for unison male chorus	for the play by George Moore
Incidental music			1933–1934	The Song of Solomon		
Film score	184		1931	The Bells		directed by Harcourt Templeman
Orchestral			1891	Intermezzo	for orchestra	
Orchestral	31		1897	A Winter Idyll	for orchestra	
Orchestral	41		1898	Suite in G minor	for string orchestra	
Orchestral	42	7	1899	Walt Whitman	for orchestra	Overture
Orchestral	43	10	1899, 1912	Suite de ballet in E♭ major: 1. Danse rustique 2. Valse; 3. Scène de nuit 4. Carnival	for orchestra	revised 1912; originally Op. 8
Orchestral	47	8	1899–1900	Symphony in F major "The Cotswolds": 1. Allegro con brio 2. Elegy (In Memoriam William Morris); 3. Scherzo; 4. Finale	for orchestra	originally Op. 10
Orchestral	54		1903?	Greeting	for orchestra	original version for violin and piano
Orchestral	66	13	1903	Indra	for orchestra	Symphonic Poem
Orchestral	86	21/1	1906, 1907	Songs of the West	for orchestra	revised 1907
Orchestral	87	21/2	1906, 1907	A Somerset Rhapsody	for orchestra	revised 1907
Orchestral	88	22	1906	2 Songs without Words: 1. Country Song; 2. Marching Song	for chamber orchestra	No. 2 also for small military band
Orchestral	107	29/1	1909–1910	Beni Mora: Oriental Suite: 1. First Dance; 2. Second Dance; 3. Finale: In the Street of Ouled Naïls	for orchestra	
Orchestral			1910	Morris Dance Tunes; Set I: 1. Bean Setting; 2. Laudnum Bunches; 3. Country Gardens; 4. Constant Billy; 5. Trunkles; 6. Morris Off; Set II: 1. Rigs o' Marlow; 2. Bluff King Hal; 3. How d'ye do, sir?; 4. Shepherd's Hey; 5. The Blue-eyed Stranger; 6. Morris Off	for orchestra	
Orchestral	108	(29/2)	1911	Phantastes, Suite in F major: 1. Prelude; 2. March; 3. Sleep; 4. Dance	for orchestra	withdrawn, originally Op. 29 No. 2
Orchestral	118	29/2	1912–1913	St Paul's Suite: 1. Jig; 2. Ostinato; 3. Intermezzo; 4. Finale: The Dargason	for string orchestra	dedicated to the orchestra at St Paul's Girls' School; Finale is an arrangement of 4th movement in Second Suite.
Orchestral	125	32	1914–1916	The Planets: 1. Mars, the Bringer of War; 2. Venus, the Bringer of Peace; 3. Mercury, the Winged Messenger; 4. Jupiter, the Bringer of Jollity; 5. Saturn, the Bringer of Old Age; 6. Uranus, the Magician; 7. Neptune, the Mystic	for orchestra and female chorus	original version for 2 pianos: 4. main theme: "I Vow to Thee, My Country"
Orchestral	126	33	1915	Japanese Suite: 1. Prelude: Song of the Fisherman; 2. Ceremonial Dance; 3. Dance of the Marionette; 4. Interlude: Song of the Fisherman; 5. Dance under the Cherry Tree; 6. Finale: Dance of the Wolves	for orchestra	
Orchestral	151	40/1	1922	A Fugal Overture	for orchestra	
Orchestral	172	47	1927	Egdon Heath (A Homage to Thomas Hardy)	for orchestra	title taken from Thomas Hardy's fictitious area Egdon Heath
Orchestral			1928	Nocturne from "A Moorside Suite"	for string orchestra	
Orchestral			1928	Fugue à la Gigue	for orchestra	original work Fugue in G major, BWV 577 by Johann Sebastian Bach; arrangement by Holst; also for band
Orchestral	178	52	1930, 1931	Hammersmith: 1. Prelude; 2. Scherzo	for orchestra	original for military band; orchestral version (1931) premiered at the same 1931 concert as William Walton's Belshazzar's Feast
Orchestral	185		1932	Jazz-Band Piece (Mr Shilkret's Maggot)	for orchestra	revised by Imogen Holst as "Capriccio" (1967)
Orchestral	190		1933	Brook Green Suite: 1. Prelude; 2. Air; 3. Dance	for string orchestra with flute, oboe and clarinet ad libitum	
Orchestral	190a		1933	Gavotte	for string orchestra with flute, oboe and clarinet ad libitum	originally intended for Brook Green Suite
Orchestral	192		1933–1934	Scherzo	for orchestra	part of an unfinished Symphony
Band				Three Folk Tunes	for small military band	
Band	88	22	1906	Marching Song	for small military band	No. 2 from 2 Songs without Words
Band	105	28/1	1909	First Suite in E-flat: 1. Chaconne; 2. Intermezzo; 3. March	for military band	
Band	106	28/2	1911	Second Suite in F: 1. March: Morris Dance, Swansea Town, Claudy Banks; 2. Song Without Words: "I'll Love My Love"; 3. Song of the Blacksmith; 4. Fantasia on the Dargason	for military band	1. also known as Three Folk Tunes or March on Three Folk Tunes
Band			1928	Fugue à la Gigue		original work Fugue in G major, BWV 577 by Johann Sebastian Bach; arrangement by Holst; also for orchestra
Band	173		1928	A Moorside Suite: 1. Scherzo; 2. Nocturne; 3. March	for brass band	unfinished transcription for military band by Holst (Scherzo and 38 bars of Nocturne); The whole work transcribed by Gordon Jacob in 1952 and Denis Wright in 1937
Band	178	52	1930	Hammersmith: 1. Prelude; 2. Scherzo	for military band	also for orchestra (1931); premiered by the US Marine Band on 17 April 1932
Concertante	74	19/1	1905	A Song of the Night	for violin and orchestra	
Concertante	75	19/2	1911	Invocation	for cello and orchestra	
Concertante	152	40/2	1923	A Fugal Concerto: 1. Moderato; 2. Adagio; 3. Allegro	for flute, oboe (or 2 violins) and string orchestra	
Concertante	175	49	1929	Double Concerto: 1. Scherzo; 2. Lament; 3. Variations on a Ground	for 2 violins and orchestra	
Concertante	191		1933	Lyric Movement	for viola and small orchestra	dedicated to violist Lionel Tertis
Chamber music			1893	Theme and Variations	for 2 violins, viola and cello	
Chamber music			1894	Air and Variations	for 2 violins, viola, cello and piano	
Chamber music			1894	Duo Concertante (Duet)	for trombone and organ	
Chamber music			1894	String Trio in G minor	for violin, viola and cello	
Chamber music	8	2	1896	Fantasiestücke: 1. March; 2. Minuet; 3. Scherzo	for oboe, 2 violin, viola and cello	revised as 3 Pieces in 1910
Chamber music	8a	2	1896, 1910	3 Pieces: 1. March; 2. Minuet; 3. Scherzo	for oboe, 2 violin, viola and cello	1910 revision of Fantasiestücke
Chamber music	9		1896	Variations	for oboe, clarinet, bassoon, violin, viola and cello	
Chamber music	10		1896	Sextet in E minor	for oboe, clarinet, bassoon, violin, viola and cello	
Chamber music	11	3	1896	Quintet in A minor: 1. Allegro moderato 2. Scherzo, Allegro vivace 3. Adagio; 4. Allegro con brio	for oboe, clarinet, horn, bassoon and piano	
Chamber music	23		1897	Scherzo	for 2 violins, 2 violas and cellos	
Chamber music			1901–1902	6 Solos: Nos. 1-5	for violin	
Chamber music	51		1902?	Lied ohne Worte	for violin and piano	
Chamber music	52		1903?	A Spring Song	for violin (or cello) and piano	
Chamber music	53		1903	Ländler	for 2 violins and piano	
Chamber music	54		1903?	Greeting	for violin and piano	also for orchestra
Chamber music	55		1904?	Maya	for violin and piano	
Chamber music	56		1904?	Valse-Étude	for violin and piano	dedicated to Marie Hall
Chamber music	67	14	1903	Quintet for Winds in A♭ major: 1. Allegro moderato 2. Adagio; 3. Minuet (in Canon) and Trio; 4. Theme and Variations: Poco allegro e cantabile	for flute, oboe, clarinet, horn and bassoon	
Chamber music	93		1906	7 Scottish Airs	for 2 violins, viola, cello and piano	
Chamber music	135	36	1916	Phantasy Quartet on British Folk Songs	for 2 violins, viola and cello	
Chamber music	158		1925	Terzetto: 1. Allegretto; 2. Un poco vivace	for flute, oboe and viola	
Organ			1891	4 Voluntaries	for organ	
Piano			1892	Arpeggio Study	for piano	
Piano			1893	Introduction and Bolero	for piano 4-hands	
Piano	5		1895	Dances: 1. Allegretto; 2. Ländler	for piano 4-hands	
Piano	6		1899	Duet in D major	for piano 4-hands	
Piano	50		1901	2 Pieces (Deux Pièces): 1. Fancine; 2. Lucille	for piano	
Piano	125	32	1914–1916	The Planets: 1. Mars, the Bringer of War; 2. Venus, the Bringer of Peace; 3. Mercury, the Winged Messenger; 4. Jupiter, the Bringer of Jollity; 5. Saturn, the Bringer of Old Age; 6. Uranus, the Magician; 7. Neptune, the Mystic	for 2 pianos	also orchestrated: 4. main theme: "I Vow to Thee, My Country"
Piano	153		1924	Toccata	for piano	founded on the Northumbrian pipe-tune "Newburn Lads"
Piano	154		1924	A Piece for Yvonne	for piano	
Piano	165	46/1	1926	Chrissemas Day in the Morning	for piano	founded on a tune from North Countrie Ballads
Piano	166	46/2	1927	2 Folk Song Fragments (2 Northumbrian Folk Tunes): 1. O! I Hae Seen the Roses Blaw; 2. The Shoemakker	for piano	founded on a tune from North Countrie Ballads
Piano	179		1930–1932; 1930; 1932	2 Pieces: 1. Nocturne; 2. Jig	for piano	
Vocal			1891	The Harper	for voice and piano	
Vocal			1891	Die Sprode	for voice and piano	
Vocal			1891–1892	There Is Dew for the Flow'ret	for voice and piano	
Vocal			1892	I Come from Haunts of Coot and Hern	for voice and piano	
Vocal			1892	Sing Heigh-Ho!	for voice and piano	1st setting
Vocal			1893	Anna-Marie	for voice and piano	
Vocal			1893	A Lake and a Fairy Boat	for voice and piano	1st setting
Vocal			1893	There Sits a Bird on Yonder Tree	for voice and piano	
Vocal			1893	The White Lady's Farewell	for voice and piano	
Vocal			1890s	The Exile of Erine	for voice and piano	
Vocal	4		1895, 1897	O Lady, Leave That Silken Thread	for baritone and piano	original version (1895) for mixed chorus a cappella; words by Thomas Hood
Vocal	14	4	1896–1898	4 Songs: 1. Slumber-Song; 2. Margrete's Cradle-Song; 3. Soft and Gently; 4. Awake, My Heart	for voice and piano	1. words by Charles Kingsley; 2. words by Henrik Ibsen in translation by William Archer; 3. words from Heinrich Heine; 4. words by Robert Bridges
Vocal	17		1897	Song to the Sleeping Lady	for voice and piano	words by George MacDonald
Vocal	19		1901–1902	The Ballade of Prince Eric	for voice and piano	words by Fritz Hart
Vocal	25		1897	A Lake and a Fairy Boat	for voice and piano	2nd setting; words by Thomas Hood
Vocal	26		1897	Sing Heigh-Ho!	for voice and piano	2nd setting; words by Charles Kingsley
Vocal	27		1897	Airly Beacon	for voice and piano	words by Charles Kingsley
Vocal	28		1890s	Twin Stars Aloft	for voice and piano	words by Charles Kingsley
Vocal	29		1890s	The Day of the Lord	for voice and piano	words by Charles Kingsley
Vocal	32		1897	Not a Sound But Echoing in Me	for voice and piano	words by George MacDonald
Vocal	33		1898	Whether We Die or Live	for voice and piano	words by George Meredith
Vocal	34	6	1898, 1900	Örnulf's Drapa	for baritone and orchestra	revised 1900; words by Henrik Ibsen in translation by William Archer
Vocal	35		1890s	Autumn Song	for voice and piano	words by Robert Bridges
Vocal	36		1898	My Joy	for voice and piano	words by Robert Bridges
Vocal	37		1890s	Draw Not Away Thy Hands	for voice and piano	words by William Morris
Vocal	38		1890s	I Scanned Her Picture	for voice and piano	
Vocal	39		1890s	Two Brown Eyes	for voice and piano	
Vocal	44		1898–1899	Bhanavar's Lament	for voice and piano	words by George Meredith
Vocal	45		1890s	Ah, Come, Fair Mistress	for voice and piano	words by Walter E. Grogan
Vocal			1900	She Who Is Dear to Me	for voice and piano	words by Walter E. Grogan
Vocal	62		1903	A Prayer for Light	for voice and piano	words by Eric Mackay
Vocal	63		1904	Dewy Roses	for voice and piano	words by Alfred H. Hyatt
Vocal	64		1903	Song of the Woods	for voice and piano	words by Alfred H. Hyatt
Vocal	65		1902–1903	To a Wild Rose	for voice and piano	words by Alfred H. Hyatt
Vocal	68	15	1902–1903	6 Songs: 1. Invocation to the Dawn; 2. Fain Would I Change That Note; 3. The Sergeant's Song; 4. In a Wood; 5. Between Us Now; 6. I Will Not Let Thee Go	for baritone and piano	1. words translated from Rig Veda by the composer 2. words by anonymous 3.~5. words by Thomas Hardy; 6. Words by Robert Bridges
Vocal	69	16	1903–1904	6 Songs: 1. Calm Is the Morn; 2. My True Love Hath My Heart; 3. Weep You No More, Sad Fountains; 4. Lovely Kind and Kindly Loving; 5. Cradle Song; 6. Peace	for soprano and piano	1. words by Alfred, Lord Tennyson; 2. words by Philip Sidney; 3. words by anonymous 4. words by Nicholas Breton; 5. words by William Blake; 6. words by Alfred H. Hyatt
Vocal	71	18	1904, 1912	The Mystic Trumpeter, Scena	for soprano and orchestra	revised 1912; setting of the poem "From Noon to Starry Night" by Walt Whitman; Colin Matthews notes that while Holst had not yet developed a musical style of his own, this early work shows "conviction and individuality", and has "few parallels in British music of this period".
Vocal	72		1904–1905	Darest Thou Now, O Soul	for voice and piano	words by Walt Whitman
Vocal	77		1890s	Now Sleep and Take They Rest	for voice and piano	words by James Mabbe after Fernando de Rojas
Vocal	79		1900s	To Hope	for voice and piano	words by anonymous
Vocal	83		1906–1908	16 Folk Songs from Hampshire: 1. Abroad as I Was Walking; 2. Lord Dunwaters; 3. The Irish Girl; 4. Young Reilly; 5. The New-mown Hay; 6. The Willow Tree; 7. Beautiful Nancy; 8. Sing Ivy; 9. John Barleycorn; 10. Bedlam City; 11. The Scolding Wife; 12. The Squire and the Thresher; 13. The Happy Stranger; 14. Young Edwin in the Lowlands Low; 15. Yonder Sits a Fare Young Damsel; 16. Our Ship She Lies in Harbour	for voice and piano	folk song arrangements by Holst
Vocal	84a		1906–1907	Stu Mo Run	for voice and piano	Scottish folk song; arrangement by Holst
Vocal	84		1906–1914	9 Folk Songs: 1. Sovay; 2. The Seeds of Love; 3. The Female Farmer; 4. Thorneyfield Woods; 5. Moorfields; 6. I'll Love My Love; 7. Claudy Banks; 8. On the Banks of the Nile; 9. Here's Adieu	for voice and piano	folk song arrangements by Holst
Vocal	95		1907	The Heart Worships	for voice and piano	words by Alice M. Buckton
Vocal	90	24	1907–1908	Hymns from the Rig Veda (Vedic Hymns) First Group: 1. Ushas (Dawn); 2. Varuna I (Sky); 3. Maruts (Stormclouds) Second Group; 4. Indra (God of Storm and Battle); 5. Varuna II (The Waters); 6. Song of the Frogs Third Group; 7. Vac (Speech); 8. Creation; 9. Faith (Sraddha)	for medium voice and piano	English words translated from the Sanskrit by the composer
Vocal	90a	(24)	1907	Ratri (The Night)	for medium voice and piano	originally included in Op. 24
Vocal	123		1914?	A Vigil of Pentecost	for voice and piano	words by Alice M. Buckton
Vocal			1911	Glory of the West	for voice and piano	arrangement by Holst
Vocal	132	35	1916–1917	4 Songs: 1. Jesu Sweet, Now Will I Sing; 2. My Soul Has Nought But Fire and Ice; 3. I Sing of a Maiden That Matchless Is; 4. My Leman Is So True	for soprano (or tenor) and violin	
Vocal	141		1918	May Day Carol	for voice and 2 violins	
Vocal	147		1920s	The Ballad of Hunting Knowe	for voice and piano	words by E. A. Ramsden
Vocal			1920s	He-Back She-Back	for voice and piano	
Vocal	174	48	1929	12 Songs: 1. Persephone; 2. Things lovelier 3. Now in these Fairylands; 4. A Little Music; 5. The Thought; 6. The Floral Bandit; 7. Envoi; 8. The Dream-City; 9. Journey's End; 10. In the Street of Lost Time; 11. Rhyme; 12. Betelgeuse	for soprano and piano	words by Humbert Wolfe
Vocal	174a	(48)	1929	Epilogue	for soprano and piano	words by Humbert Wolfe; originally intended for Op. 48
Vocal			1930	God Be in My Head	for voice and piano	
Choral			1887	Horatius	for mixed chorus and orchestra	
Choral			1890	A Christmas Carol	for mixed chorus and piano	
Choral			1891–1892	Sailor's Chorus	for male chorus and orchestra	
Choral			1891–1892	The Strain Upraise	for unison voices and piano	
Choral			1891–1892	Advent Litany	for unison voices and piano	
Choral			1892	Sanctus	for unison voices and organ	
Choral			1892	New Year Chorus	for mixed chorus and piano	
Choral			1892	Ode to the North East Wind	for male chorus and orchestra	
Choral			1893–1894	Winter and the Birds	for mixed chorus and piano	
Choral			1894	Love Wakes and Weeps	for mixed chorus a cappella	
Choral			1894	Ave Maria, Maiden Mild	for female chorus a cappella	
Choral			1894	Fathoms Deep Beneath the Wave	for female chorus a cappella	
Choral			1894	Now Winter's Winds Are Banished	for female chorus a cappella	
Choral			1894	Summer's Welcome	for female chorus a cappella	
Choral			1894	Winter and the Birds	for female chorus a cappella	
Choral	1		1895	The Autumn Is Old	for mixed chorus a cappella	words by Thomas Hood
Choral	2		1895	The Stars Are with the Voyager	for mixed chorus a cappella	words by Thomas Hood
Choral	3		1895	Spring It Is Cheery	for mixed chorus a cappella	words by Thomas Hood
Choral	4		1895	O Lady, Leave That Silken Thread	for mixed chorus a cappella	words by Thomas Hood; also for baritone and piano
Choral	12		1890s	All Night I Waited by the Spring	for female chorus a cappella	
Choral	13	4	1896	3 Short Part-Songs: 1. In the Forest Moonbeam-Brightened; 2. All the Nests with Song Are Ringing; 3. Soft and Gently through My Soul	for female chorus a cappella	words translated from Heinrich Heine
Choral	15		1896	There's a Voice in the Wind	for mixed chorus a cappella	
Choral	16		1896	The Kiss	for mixed chorus a cappella	words by Ben Jonson
Choral	18		1890s	Ah Tyrant Love	for mixed chorus a cappella	words by Charles Kingsley
Choral	20		1896	Light Leaves Whisper	for mixed chorus a cappella	words by Fritz Hart
Choral	22		1893–1896	Not Unto Us, O Lord	for mixed chorus and organ (or piano)	Biblical words: Psalm 115
Choral	24		1897	O Spring's Little Children	for female chorus a cappella	words by Francis Thompson
Choral	30	5	1897	Clear and Cool	for mixed chorus and orchestra	words by Charles Kingsley
Choral	40		1898	Clouds o'er the Summer Sky, Canon	for female chorus (2 sopranos) and piano	words by Fritz Hart
Choral			1899	Autumn Song	for female chorus a cappella	words by Francis Thompson; also for mixed chorus a cappella, Op. 9a No. 2
Choral	48	9a	1897–1900	5 Part-Songs: 1. Love Is Enough; 2. To Sylvia; 3. Autumn; 4. Come Away, Death; 5. A Love Song	for mixed chorus a cappella	1. words by William Morris; 2. words by Francis Thompson; also for female chorus a cappella (1899); 3. words by William Morris; 4. words by William Shakespeare; 5. words by William Morris
Choral	49	9b	1900	Ave Maria	for female chorus a cappella	
Choral	57		1912	I love Thee	for mixed chorus a cappella	words by Thomas Hood
Choral	58		1903	Thou Didst Delight My Eyes	for mixed chorus a cappella	words by Robert Bridges
Choral	59		1890s	It Was a Lover and His Lass	for mixed chorus a cappella	words by William Shakespeare
Choral	61	12	1902–1903	5 Part-Songs: 1. Dream Tryst; 2. Ye Little Birds; 3. Her Eyes the Glow-Worm Lend Thee; 4. Now Is the Month of Maying; 5. Come to Me	for mixed chorus a cappella	1. words by Francis Thompson; 2. words by Thomas Heywood; 3. words by Robert Herrick; 4. words by anonymous, 16th century 5. words by Christina Rossetti
Choral	70	17	1903	King Estmere	for mixed chorus and orchestra	
Choral	73		1904–1905	3 Hymns for the English Hymnal: 1. In the Bleak Midwinter; 2. From Glory to Glory Advancing; 3. Holy Ghost, Come Down Upon Thy Children	for mixed chorus and organ	1. words by Christina Rossetti; 2. words by C. W. Humphreys after Divine Liturgy of St. John Chrysostom; 3. words by Frederick William Faber
Choral	76		1908	In Youth Is Pleasure	for mixed chorus a cappella	words by Robert Wever
Choral	78		1908	Now Rest Thee from All Care	for mixed chorus a cappella	words by anonymous
Choral	80	20a	1905	Songs from "The Princess": 1. Sweet and Low; 2. The Splendour Falls; 3. Tears, Idle Tears; 4. O Swallow, Swallow; 5. Now Sleeps the Crimson Petal	for female chorus a cappella	words by Alfred, Lord Tennyson
Choral	81		1905	Home They Brought Her Warrior Dead	for female chorus a cappella	words from The Princess by Alfred, Lord Tennyson
Choral	82	20b	1907	4 Old English Carols: 1. A Babe Is Born; 2. Now Let Us Sing; 3. Jesu, Thou the Virgin-born; 4. The Saviour of the World Is Born (Salvator mundi natus est)	for mixed chorus and piano	words by anonymous
Choral	85		1904–1919	7 Folk Songs: 1. On the Banks of the Nile; 2. The Willow Tree; 3. Our Ship She Lies in Harbour; 4. I'll Love My Love; 5. Claudy Banks; 6. John Barleycorn; 7. Spanish Ladies	for unison voices and orchestra (or piano)	
Choral			1908	Adoramus Te Christe [orig. Orlando di Lasso, arr. Holst]	for female chorus a cappella	
Choral			1908	Benedictus [orig. William Byrd, arr. Holst]	for female chorus a cappella	
Choral			1908	Help Me, O Lord [orig. Thomas Augustine, arr. Holst]	for female chorus a cappella	
Choral			1908	How Merrily We Live [orig. Michael Este, arr. Holst]	for female chorus a cappella	
Choral			1908	2 Part-Songs	for mixed chorus a cappella	
Choral	91		1907–1908 1916	2 Carols: 1. A Welcome Song; 2. Terly, Terlow	for mixed chorus, oboe and cello	words by anonymous Old English Carols
Choral	92		1909	Pastoral	for female chorus a cappella	
Choral	97	26	1908	Hymns from the Rig Veda, First Group: 1. Battle Hymn; 2. Hymn to the Unknown God; 3. Funeral Hymn	for mixed chorus and orchestra (or piano)	English words translated from the Sanskrit by the composer
Choral	98	26	1909	Hymns from the Rig Veda, Second Group: 1. To Varuna (God of the Waters); 2. To Agni (God of Fire); 3. Funeral Chant	for female chorus and orchestra (or piano)	English words translated from the Sanskrit by the composer
Choral	99	26	1910	Hymns from the Rig Veda, Third Group: 1. Hymn to the Dawn; 2. Hymn to the Waters; 3. Hymn to Vena; 4. Hymn of the Travellers	for female chorus and harp (or piano)	English words translated from the Sanskrit by the composer
Choral	100	26	1912	Hymns from the Rig Veda, Fourth Group: 1. Hymn to Agni (The Sacrificial Fire); 2. Hymn to Soma; 3. Hymn to Manas; 4. Hymn to Indra	for male chorus and string orchestra with brass ad libitum (or piano)	English words translated from the Sanskrit by the composer
Choral	103		1909	O England, My Country	for unison voices and orchestra (or piano)	words by G. K. Menzies
Choral	104		1909	A Song of Fairies	for female chorus a cappella	
Choral	109		1910	Christmas Day: Choral Fantasy on Old Carols: 1. Good Christian Men Rejoice; 2. God Rest You Merry Gentlemen; 3. Come Ye Lofty, Come Ye Lowly; 4. The First Nowell	for mixed chorus and orchestra (or organ)	
Choral			1910	Old Airs and Glees [arr. Holst]	for female chorus a cappella	
Choral	110		1910	4 Part-Songs: 1. Song of the Shipbuilders; 2. Song of the Shoemakers; 3. Song of the Fishermen; 4. Song of the Drovers	for children's chorus and piano	words by John Greenleaf Whittier
Choral	111	30	1910–1912	The Cloud Messenger	for alto, mixed chorus and orchestra	founded on a Sanskrit poem of Kālidāsa; words translated by the composer
Choral	112		1911	Two Eastern Pictures: 1. Spring; 2. Summer	for female chorus and harp (or piano)	words translated by the composer from Kālidāsa
Choral	113		1911	In Loyal Bonds United: Empire Day Song	for unison voices and piano	words by Shapcott Wensley
Choral			1912	News From Whydah [orig. Henry Balfour Gardiner, orch. Holst]	for mixed chorus and orchestra	
Choral			1912	Lord, Who Hast Made Us For Thine Own: No. 2 of the Two Psalms	for female chorus and orchestra	
Choral	115	31/1	1911	Hecuba's Lament	for alto, female chorus and string orchestra	words by Gilbert Murray after Euripides
Choral	116	31/2	1913	Hymn to Dionysus	for female chorus and orchestra	words by Gilbert Murray after Euripides
Choral	117		1912	2 Psalms: 1. Psalm 86; 2. Psalm 148 (Lord, Who Hast Made Us For Thine Own)	for mixed chorus, organ (or brass) and string orchestra	1. with tenor solo; also for female chorus and orchestra (or organ, or piano)
Choral	118a		1911	Playground Song	for unison voices and piano	for St Paul's Girls' School
Choral	119		1913	The Swallow Leaves Her Nest	for female chorus a cappella	words by Thomas Lovell Beddoes
Choral	120		1913	The Homecoming	for male chorus a cappella	words by Thomas Hardy
Choral	121		1914	A Dirge for Two Veterans	for male chorus, brass and percussion	words by Walt Whitman
Choral	124		1915	Dirge and Hymeneal	for female chorus and piano (or harp)	words by Thomas Lovell Beddoes
Choral	127		1915	Nunc Dimittis	for mixed chorus a cappella	
Choral	128	34/1	1916	This Have I Done for My True Love	for mixed chorus a cappella	
Choral	129	34/2	1916	Lullay My Liking	for soprano and mixed chorus a cappella	
Choral	130	34/3	1916	Of One That Is So Fair and Bright	for soprano, alto, tenor, bass and mixed chorus a cappella	
Choral	131	34/4	1916	Bring Us in Good Ale	for mixed chorus a cappella	
Choral			1916	Personent hodie, Christmas Song	for unison chorus and orchestra	arrangement by Holst; Latin text and melody from Piæ Cantiones
Choral			1916	Short Communion Service	for equal voices a cappella	original work by William Byrd; arrangement by Holst
Choral	133		1916–1917	3 Carols: 1. I Saw Three Ships; 2. Christmas Song; 3. Masters in This Hall	for unison voices and orchestra	2. words by Jane M. Joseph after Piæ Cantiones; 3. words by William Morris
Choral	134	36a	1916	3 Festival Choruses: 1. Let All Mortal Flesh Keep Silence; 2. Turn Back, O Man; 3. A Festival Chime	for mixed chorus and orchestra	1. words by Gerard Moultrie after Biblical or other sacred texts 2.~3. words by Clifford Bax
Choral	136	36b	1916	6 Choral Folk Songs: 1. I Sowed the Seeds of Love; 2. There Was a Tree; 3. Matthew, Mark, Luke and John; 4. The Song of the Blacksmith; 5. I Love My Love; 6. Swansea Town	for mixed chorus a cappella	1., 3.~6. also for male chorus a cappella
Choral	137		1916	Diverus and Lazarus	for mixed chorus a cappella	
Choral	138		1917	2 Part-Songs for Children: 1. The Corn Song; 2. Song of the Lumbermen	for children's chorus and piano	words by John Greenleaf Whittier
Choral	139		1917	A Dream of Christmas	for female chorus and string orchestra (or piano)	
Choral	142		1916–1917	Here Is Joy for Every Age	for female chorus a cappella	words by John Mason Neale after "Ecce novum gaudium"
Choral			1916–1919	All People That on Earth Do Dwell [arr. Holst]	for mixed chorus and orchestra	
Choral	140	37	1917-1919	The Hymn of Jesus	for 2 mixed choruses, female semi-chorus and orchestra	text chosen and translated from the Apocryphal Acts of St. John, next to the hymn Pange lingua gloriosi proelium certaminis
Choral	144	38	1919	Ode to Death	for mixed chorus and orchestra	words by Walt Whitman
Choral	145		1919	Short Festival Te Deum	for mixed chorus and orchestra	
Choral	148		1921, 1918?	"I Vow to Thee, My Country", Hymn	for unison voices and orchestra	based on the theme from the middle section of the Jupiter movement of The Planets; words by Cecil Spring Rice
Choral	155	41	1923–1924	First Choral Symphony: 1. Prelude: Invocation to Pan; 2. Song and Bacchanal; 3. Ode on a Grecian Urn; 4. Scherzo: Fancy; 5. Folly's Song; 6. Finale	for soprano, mixed chorus and orchestra	words by John Keats
Choral	157		1925	Ode to C.K.S. and the Oriana	for mixed chorus a cappella	for Charles Kennedy Scott and the Oriana Madrigal Society on the 21st foundation day; words by Jane M. Joseph
Choral	159; 160	43	1924; 1925	2 Motets: 1. The Evening-Watch: Dialogue between Body and Soul; 2. Sing Me the Men Ere This	for mixed chorus a cappella	1. words by Henry Vaughan; 2. words by Digby Mackworth Dolben
Choral			1925	God Is Love, His the Care		Hymn
Choral	161		1925	4 Hymns for Songs of Praise: 1. O Valiant Hearts; 2. In This World, the Isle of Dreams; 3. Onward, Christian Soldiers!; 4. I Sought Thee Round About, O Thou My God		for the hymnal Songs of Praise; 1. words by J. S. Arkwright; 2. words by Robert Herrick; 3. words by Sabine Baring-Gould; 4. words by Percy Dearmer after Thomas Heywood
Choral	162	44	1925–1926	7 Part-Songs: 1. Say Who Is This?; 2. O Love, I Complain; 3. Angel Spirits of Sleep; 4. When First We Met; 5. Sorrow and Joy; 6. Love on My Heart from Heaven Fell; 7. Assemble, All Ye Maidens	for soprano, female chorus and string orchestra	words by Robert Bridges
Choral			1927	O Magnum Mysterium [edt. Holst]	for mixed chorus a cappella	
Choral			1927	By Weary Stages		Hymn
Choral			1927	Gird on Thy Sword/Lift Up Your Arms		Hymn
Choral	167		1928	Christ Hath a Garden	for female chorus and small orchestra	words by Robert Bridges after Isaac Watts
Choral	168		1927	Man Born to Toil	for mixed chorus, organ and bells ad libitum	words by Robert Bridges
Choral	169		1927	Eternal Father	for soprano, mixed chorus, organ and bells ad libitum	words by Robert Bridges
Choral	171		1928	Canterbury Bells: 2 Rounds: 1. Within This Place All Beauty Dwells; 2. To Bother Missis Bell	for 4 equal voices a cappella	words by Mabel Rodwell Jones
Choral	177	51	1930	A Choral Fantasia	for soprano, mixed chorus and orchestra	words by Robert Bridges
Choral	181		1931	Roadways	for unison voices and piano	words by John Masefield
Choral	182		1931	Wassail Song	for mixed chorus a cappella	
Choral	183		1930–1931	12 Welsh Folk Songs: 1. Lisa Lan; 2. Green Grass; 3. The Dove; 4. Awake, Awake; 5. The Nightingale and Linnet; 6. The Mother-In-Law; 7. The First Love; 8. O 'Twas on a Monday morning 9. My Sweetheart's Like Venus (Mae 'nghariad i'n Fenws); 10. White Summer Rose; 11. The Lively Pair; 12. The Lover's Complaint	for mixed chorus a cappella	words adapted by Steuart Wilson
Choral	186	53	1931–1932	6 Choruses: 1. Good Friday; 2. Intercession; 3. How Mighty Are the Sabbaths; 4. A Love Song; 5. Drinking Song; 6. Before Sleep	for male chorus and string orchestra (or piano)	words from medieval Latin lyrics translated by Helen Waddell
Choral	186a	(53)	1931	On the Battle Which Was Fought at Fontenoy	for male chorus and string orchestra (or piano, or organ)	originally intended for Op. 53; words from medieval Latin lyrics translated by Helen Waddell
Choral	187		1932	8 Canons: 1. If You Love Songs; 2. Lovely Venus; 3. The Fields of Sorrow; 4. David's Lament for Jonathan; 5. O Strong of Heart; 6. Truth of All Truth; 7. Evening on the Moselle; 8. If 'Twere the Time of Lilies	Nos. 1~6 for equal voices a cappella Nos. 7~8 for equal voices and piano	poems from mediaeval Latin lyrics in translation by Helen Waddell
Choral	188		1932	"O Spiritual Pilgrim"	for soprano and mixed chorus a cappella	words by James Elroy Flecker
Choral	189		1933	Come Live with Me	for 2 equal voices a cappella	words by Christopher Marlowe
	-		1906	Folk Songs from Somerset		thought lost; rediscovered 2017

== Sources ==
- Holst, Imogen (1974). A Thematic Catalogue of Gustav Holst's Music, London: Faber Music Ltd. ISBN 978-0571100040
