= The Mystic Trumpeter =

Scena by Gustav Holst

- H.71 Op. 18
- Scena by Gustav Holst
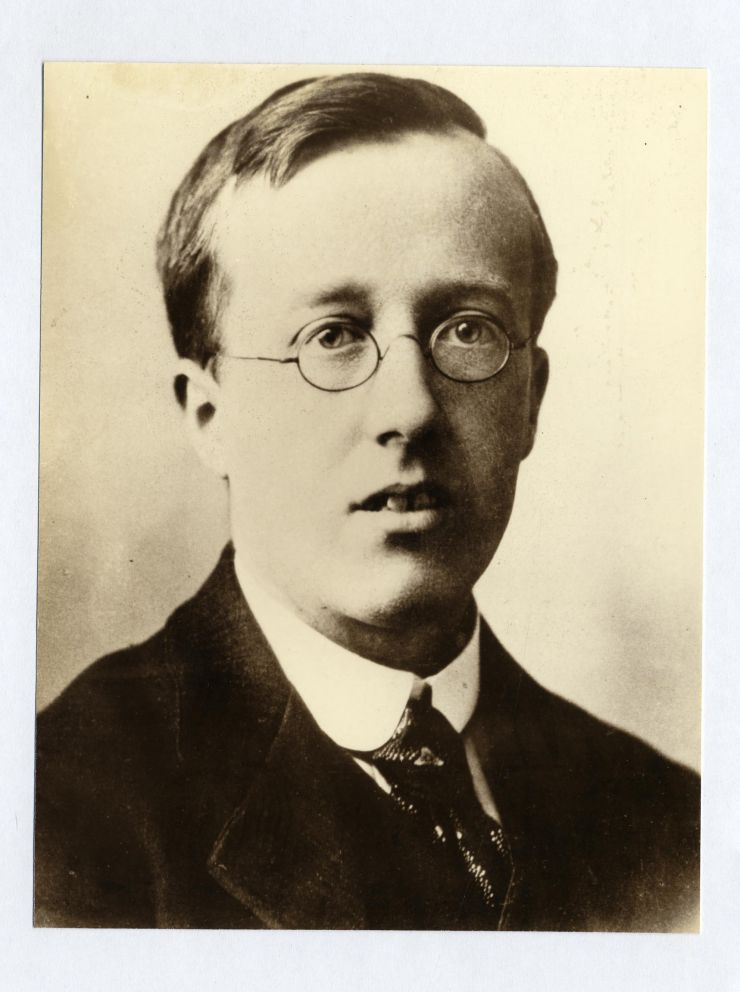
- Gustav Holst, circa 1901
- Year: 1904
- Based on: "The Mystic Trumpeter" in From Noon to Starry Night, Leaves of Grass by Walt Whitman
- Published: 1979
- Publisher: Colin Matthews, Imogen Holst

Premiere
- Date: 1905
- Location: Queen's Hall, London, United Kingdom

The Mystic Trumpeter, H. 71, Op. 18, is a scena composed by Gustav Holst for solo soprano, and orchestra. It was written in the year 1904, first performed in 1905, and revised in 1912. It is set to the poem "The Mystic Trumpeter" written by Walt Whitman. The Mystic Trumpeter was a neglected work of Holst's works for orchestra, receiving only two performances in his lifetime.

The original manuscript of the piece was edited and published by English composer Colin Matthews, along with Holst's daughter, Imogen Holst, in 1979 for its first recording, along with being the first performance of the work since Holst's death.

== Composition ==
Holst's early interest in Walt Whitman's poetry led him to compose The Mystic Trumpeter, which is a scena based on the poem "The Mystic Trumpeter" in "From Noon to Starry Night" by Walt Whitman. The piece features a solo soprano voice, that recites the poem, and a large orchestra. It was one of Gustav Holst's most significant works for orchestra at the time, that preceded Holst's later orchestral works.

This scena is heavily influenced by Richard Wagner's style, in part to its chromaticism and his first ever use of polytonality that he would use in the composition of his later works. However, it is one of the last pieces to be influenced in this way, as he later became more interested in English folksong.

Colin Matthews notes that while Holst had not yet developed a musical style of his own, this early work shows "conviction and individuality", and has "few parallels in British music of this period".

A typical performance takes about 18-20 minutes.

== Text of the scena ==
Holst takes most of Walt Whitman's poem, while omitting the second stanza, fourth stanza, the last 3 verses of the sixth stanza, and verses 5-7 of the seventh stanza.

HARK, some wild trumpeter, some strange musician,
Hovering unseen in air, vibrates capricious tunes to-night.
I hear thee trumpeter, listening alert I catch thy notes,
Now pouring, whirling like a tempest round me,
Now low, subdued, now in the distance lost.

Blow trumpeter free and clear, I follow thee,
While at thy liquid prelude, glad, serene,
The fretting world, the streets, the noisy hours of day withdraw,
A holy calm descends like dew upon me,
I walk in cool refreshing night the walks of Paradise,
I scent the grass, the moist air and the roses;
Thy song expands my numb'd imbonded spirit, thou freest,
launchest me,
Floating and basking upon heaven's lake.

Blow again trumpeter! and for thy theme,
Take now the enclosing theme of all, the solvent and the setting,
Love, that is pulse of all, the sustenance and the pang,
The heart of man and woman all for love,
No other theme but love—knitting, enclosing, all-diffusing love.

O how the immortal phantoms crowd around me!
I see the vast alembic ever working, I see and know the flames
that heat the world,
The glow, the blush, the beating hearts of lovers,
So blissful happy some, and some so silent, dark, and nigh to
death;
Love, that is all the earth to lovers—love, that mocks time and
space,
Love, that is day and night—love, that is sun and moon and stars,
Love, that is crimson, sumptuous, sick with perfume,
No other words but words of love, no other thought but love.

Blow again trumpeter—conjure war's alarums.
Swift to thy spell a shuddering hum like distant thunder rolls,
Lo, where the arm'd men hasten—lo, mid the clouds of dust the
glint of bayonets,
I see the grime-faced cannoneers, I mark the rosy flash amid the
smoke, I hear the cracking of the guns;

O trumpeter, methinks I am myself the instrument thou playest,
Thou melt'st my heart, my brain—thou movest, drawest, chan-
gest them at will;
And now thy sullen notes send darkness through me,
Thou takest away all cheering light, all hope.

Utter defeat upon me weighs—all lost—the foe victorious,
(Yet 'mid the ruins Pride colossal stands unshaken to the last,
Endurance, resolution to the last.)

Now trumpeter for thy close,
Vouchsafe a higher strain than any yet,
Sing to my soul, renew its languishing faith and hope,
Rouse up my slow belief, give me some vision of the future,
Give me for once its prophecy and joy.

O glad, exulting, culminating song!
A vigor more than earth's is in thy notes,
Marches of victory—man disenthral'd—the conqueror at last,
Hymns to the universal God from universal man—all joy!
A reborn race appears—a perfect world, all joy!
Women and men in wisdom innocence and health—all joy!
Riotous laughing bacchanals fill'd with joy!
War, sorrow, suffering gone—the rank earth purged—nothing
but joy left!
The ocean fill'd with joy—the atmosphere all joy!
Joy! joy! in freedom, worship, love! joy in the ecstasy of life!
Enough to merely be! enough to breathe!
Joy! joy! all over joy!

== Instrumentation ==
This scena is scored for solo soprano and large orchestra, consisting of the following:

=== Woodwinds ===
- 3 flutes (3rd doubling piccolo)
- 2 oboes
- 1 cor anglais
- 2 clarinets in B♭
- 1 bass clarinet in B♭
- 2 bassoons

=== Brass ===
- 4 horns in F
- 3 trumpets in F
- 3 trombones
- 1 tuba

=== Percussion ===
- timpani
- celesta
- bass drum
- cymbals (crash and suspended, to be played with timpani sticks)
- snare drum
- glockenspiel
- triangle

=== Strings ===
- harp
- 1st violins
- 2nd violins
- violas
- violoncellos
- double basses (with low C),

In the 1979 edition, conductor Andrew Davis also added tambourine to the percussion section.
