= Second Suite in F for Military Band =

Suite for military band by Gustav Holst

The Second Suite in F for Military Band (Op. 28, No. 2) is Gustav Holst's second of his two suites for concert band. Although performed less frequently than the First Suite in E♭, it is still a staple of the band repertoire. The Second Suite, written in 1911 and first published in 1922, dedicated to James Causley Windram, is longer and considered more difficult to play than its sister suite.

During Holst's earlier years as a composer, he took interest (as did many composers at the time) in folk music, and wrote many pieces based on folk tunes. He provided piano accompaniments in 1909 to 16 songs collected by George Gardiner for publication in 'Folk Songs from Hampshire', a volume in Cecil Sharp's County Songs series. He was taken with them and incorporated several into this suite (he later made choral arrangements of several, including ones he had already used in the suite). His contemporary and friend Ralph Vaughan Williams later based his own Folk Song Suite on English folk tunes. Seven traditional tunes are compressed into the four movements of Holst's suite. Percy Grainger preceded them both by a few years with his interest in Lincolnshire folk singers but didn't get around to writing his band arrangement called Lincolnshire Posy until 1937 on the invitation of the American Band Masters Association for their convention in Milwaukee.

There have been several editions of the work, most recently by Boosey & Hawkes (1984), edited by Colin Mathews, and by Ludwig/Masters (2006), edited by Frederick Fennell. In the 1940s, Gordon Jacob arranged it for full orchestra under the title "A Hampshire Suite".

== Instrumentation ==
In contrast to the elastic scoring of the First Suite, Holst was much more specific with the scoring of the Second Suite. His original manuscript specified the following instruments:

Woodwinds
Flutes and piccolo in D♭ (one stave)
Oboe
Clarinet in E♭
Solo clarinet in B♭
3 clarinets in B♭ (first doubling the solo part in tutti passages)
2 bassoons
Alto saxophone in E♭
Tenor saxophone in B♭

Brass
2 cornets in B♭ (first part divided a2 (a due; in unison))
4 horns in E♭ and F
2 tenor trombones
Bass trombone
Euphonium
Tubas (divided a2)

Percussion
Snare drum
Bass drum
Cymbals
Triangle
Tambourine
Anvil

The 1948 full score published by Boosey & Hawkes added the following instruments:

Alto clarinet in E♭
Bass clarinet in B♭
Soprano saxophone in B♭
Baritone saxophone in E♭
Bass saxophone/Contrabass clarinet in B♭ (divided a2)
2 trumpets in B♭

In his revised 1984 score, Colin Matthews includes the bass clarinet, and baritone and bass saxophones, to match the instrumentation of his revised Suite in E♭.

== Structure ==
I. March

II. Song Without Words "I'll Love My Love"

III. Song of the Blacksmith

IV. Fantasia on the "Dargason"

The Second Suite consists of four movements, all based on specific English folk songs.

=== I. March: Morris dance, Swansea Town, Claudy Banks ===
The "March" of the Second Suite begins with a simple five note motif between the low and high instruments of the band. The first folk tune is heard in the form of a traditional British brass band march using the morris-dance tune "Glorishears". After a brief climax, the second strain begins with a solo euphonium playing the second folk tune in the suite, "Swansea Town". The theme is repeated by the full band before the trio. For the trio, Holst modulates to the unconventional subdominant minor of B♭ minor and changes the time signature to 6/8, thereby changing the meter. Usually one would modulate to subdominant major in traditional march form. While Sousa, reputably the "king of marches", would sometimes change time signatures for the trio (most notably in "El Capitán"), it was not commonplace. The third theme, called "Claudy Banks", is heard in a low woodwind soli, as is standard march orchestration. Then the first two tunes are repeated da capo.

=== II. "Song Without Words,"I'll Love My Love" ===
Holst places the fourth folk song, "I'll Love My Love" in stark contrast to the first movement. The movement begins with a chord from French horns and moves into a solo of clarinet with oboe over a flowing accompaniment in F Dorian. The solo is then repeated by trumpet, forming an arc of intensity. The climax of the piece is a fermata in measure 32, followed by a trumpet pick-up into the final measures of the piece.

=== III. Song of the Blacksmith ===
Again, Holst contrasts the slow second movement to the rather upbeat third movement which features the folk song "A Blacksmith Courted Me". The brass section plays in a pointillistic style depicting a later Holst style. There are many time signature changes (4/4 to 3/4) making the movement increasingly difficult because the brass section has all of their accompaniment on the up-beats of each measure. The upper woodwinds and horns join on the melody around the body of the piece, and are accompanied with the sound of a blacksmith forging metal with an anvil called for in the score. The final D major chord has a glorious, heavenly sound, which opens way to the final movement. This chord works so effectively perhaps because it is unexpected: the entire movement is in F major when the music suddenly moves to the major of the relative minor.

=== IV. Fantasia on the Dargason ===
This movement is not based on any folk songs, but rather has two tunes from Playford's Dancing Master of 1651. The finale of the suite opens with an alto saxophone solo based on the folk tune "Dargason", a 16th-century English dance tune included in the first edition of The Dancing Master. The fantasia continues through several variations encompassing the full capabilities of the band. The final folk tune, "Greensleeves", is cleverly woven into the fantasia by the use of hemiolas, with "Dargason" being in 6/8 and "Greensleeves" being in 3/4. At the climax of the movement, the two competing themes are placed in competing sections. As the movement dies down, a tuba and piccolo duet forms a call back to the beginning of the suite with the competition of low and high registers.

The name dargason may perhaps come from an Irish legend that tells of a monster resembling a large bear (although much of the description of the creature has been lost over time), the dargason tormented the Irish countryside. During the Irish uprising of the late 18th century, the dargason is supposed to have attacked a British camp killing many soldiers. This tale aside, dargason is more likely derived from an Old English word for dwarf or fairy, and the tune has been considered English (or Welsh) since at least the 16th century. It is also known as "Sedony" (or Sedany) or "Welsh Sedony".

Holst later rewrote and rescored this movement for string orchestra, as the final movement of his St Paul's Suite (1912), which he wrote for his music students at St Paul's Girls' School.
