= St Paul's Suite =

Work for string orchestra by Gustav Holst

St Paul's Suite in C major (Op. 29, No. 2), originally titled simply Suite in C, is a popular work for string orchestra by the English composer Gustav Holst. Finished in 1913, but not published until 1922 due to revisions, it takes its name from St Paul's Girls' School in Hammersmith, London. Holst served as the school's "music master" from 1905 to 1934 and was grateful to the school for building a soundproof studio for him. The suite is one of many pieces he wrote for the school's students.

== Form ==
The fourth movement played by the United States Marine Band's Marine Chamber Orchestra

The suite consists of four movements:

1. Jig: Vivace
2. Ostinato: Presto
3. Intermezzo: Andante con moto
4. Finale (The Dargason): Allegro

A typical performance lasts 13 minutes.

== Analysis ==
=== I. Jig ===
Incipit of the first movement

The jig is introduced in alternating 6/8 and 9/8 time. A contrasting theme is then introduced, which is later blended with the original jig.

=== II. Ostinato ===
Main theme of the second movement

The movement opens with an ostinato played by the second violins. The principal theme is then introduced by the solo violin, while the second violins keep alternating the ostinato.

=== III. Intermezzo ===
The movement was originally labeled "Dance" in the manuscript. The principal theme is introduced by the solo violin to a setting of pizzicato chords. The solo viola then joins the violin in a duet. Finally, the melody is played in a quartet of soloists.

=== IV. Finale (The Dargason) ===
Incipit of the fourth movement

The Finale was arranged from the "Fantasia on the Dargason" from Holst's Second Suite in F for Military Band. The titular folk song "Dargason" is heard in the soft introduction. "Dargason" is then followed by "Greensleeves" played in the cellos. The two folk songs are then played together until the end of the movement.

== Recordings ==
Roy Goodman and the New Queen's Hall Orchestra recorded the suite in 1997.
