= Lansdown Castle =

1892 comic opera by Gustav Holst

Lansdown Castle or The Sorcerer of Tewkesbury
- Comic opera by Gustav Holst
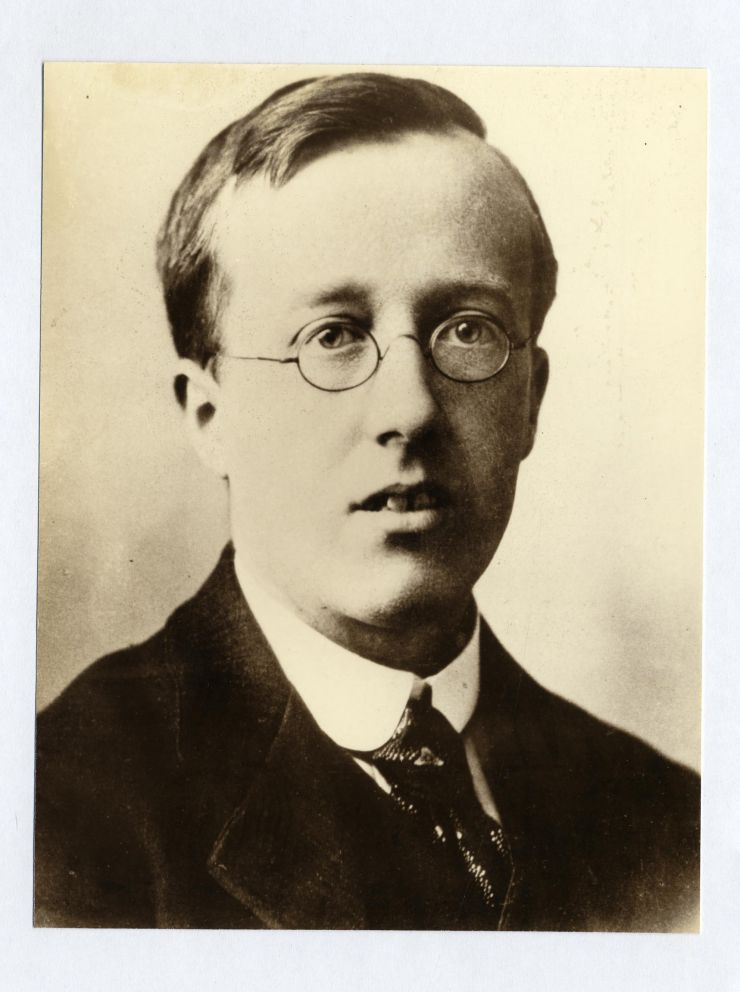
- The composer in his mid-twenties, c. 1901.
- Librettist: Colonel A.C. Cunningham
- Language: English
- Premiere: 7 February 1893; Cheltenham Corn Exchange

Lansdown Castle or The Sorcerer of Tewkesbury is a two-act operetta written in 1892 by the English composer Gustav Holst, to a libretto by Colonel A. C. Cunningham.

== Synopsis ==
Two titled couples living in Lansdown Castle seek the magical services of Hocus Pocus, the Sorcerer of Tewkesbury. The two lords of the castle visit Tewkesbury in disguise, hoping to avoid paying the sorcerer’s fee. Their wives sense that mischief is afoot, and arrive in Tewkesbury ahead of their husbands.

Seeing through the men's disguises, the sorcerer demands his money while holding the women hostage behind a magic mirror. The women offer to pay, but have no money on them. After the men escape and return, the sorcerer eventually relents, and all is resolved with a sextet: Your squabbles have come to an end.

== Reception ==
The first complete performance was at Cheltenham Corn Exchange on 7 February 1893, directed by D'Arcy de Ferrars, with Holst accompanying on piano. It was well received, with the audience calling for encores of several numbers, including a 'Nagging Trio' and a quartet, 'Beef and Beer'. There were repeat performances of the work on the following two days.

The Cheltenham press suggested that "...like all comic operas of recent date it more or less followed the lines of Gilbert and Sullivan", expressing the opinion that the work "...did great credit to the young composer, and gave promise of future achievements."

According to the composer's daughter Imogen Holst, the Cheltenham audience had been 'shocked' at one point when a fragment of an Anglican chant was used as a magic incantation. Holst's friend Fritz Hart recalls that the composer found the audience's reaction highly amusing.

In 1926, writing in The Musical Times, Richard Capell noted that the Gloucestershire Press had suggested the influence of Arthur Sullivan. Both Holst and his father were admirers of Sullivan. Imogen Holst believed that there was also a 'Sullivanesque' influence to be found in a later comic opera by Holst, his Opus 1, The Revoke.

Fritz Hart also thought that Lansdown Castle owed much to one of Holst's early loves, the music of Edvard Grieg. Holst told Hart that he failed in his application for the Composition Scholarship at the Royal College of Music, and that the work he had submitted for the examination was Lansdown Castle.

Musicians from Pate's Grammar School in Cheltenham revived Lansdown Castle in 2019.
