= A Dirge for Two Veterans =

1914 choral work by Gustav Holst

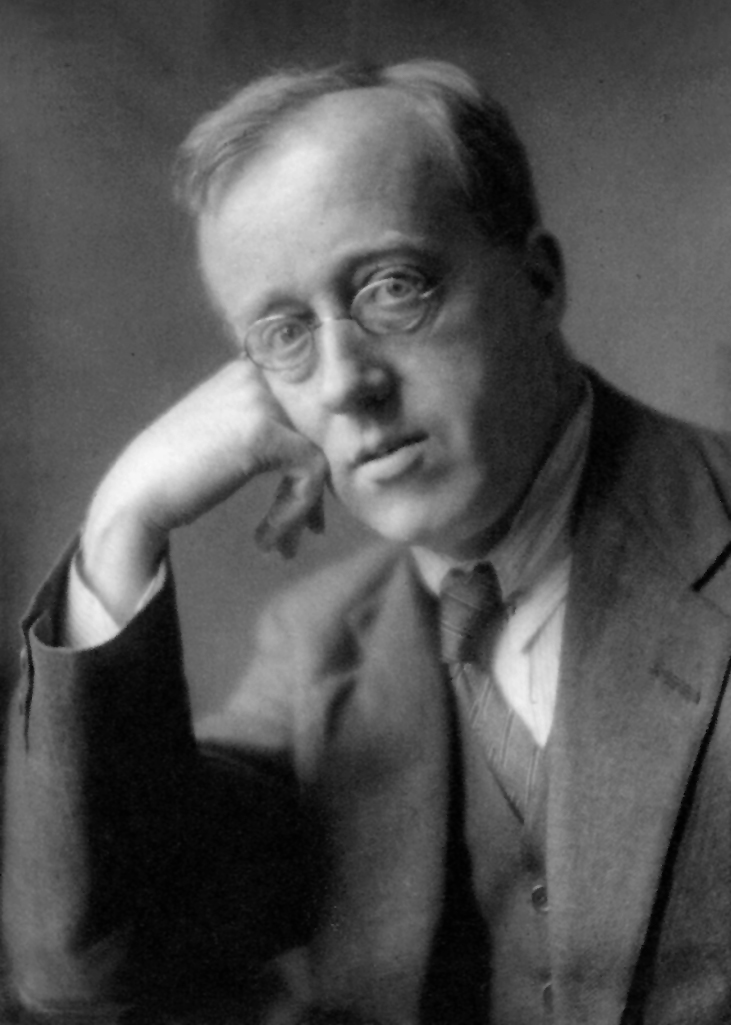
Gustav Holst ca. 1921

A Dirge for Two Veterans (1914), H121, is a short (about 5 minutes) work by the English composer Gustav Holst, scored for male voices, brass and percussion. It is a setting of a poem by Walt Whitman, for whose works Holst had a lifelong enthusiasm. It has been called one of Holst's finest choral pieces.

== Scoring ==
A Dirge for Two Veterans is scored for male voices, 3 cornets or trumpets, 2 bombardons, and percussion. Holst specified that the two bombardons might be substituted by one bombardon and one trombone, or in a concert room by cellos and double basses.

== Composition ==
Holst encountered the poems of Walt Whitman in his student days, and was excited by the poet's freedom of rhythm and his vision of a worldwide brotherhood of man. His attempts to set Whitman at that time failed because of the inadequacy of his technique, but many years later, in his maturity, he returned to the challenge, perhaps as a response to his friend Ralph Vaughan Williams's very dissimilar 1911 setting of "Dirge for Two Veterans", eventually incorporated into his Dona nobis pacem. Holst's daughter Imogen believed that A Dirge was written during the latter months of 1914 and was the composer's first reaction to World War I, but his later biographer Michael Short discovered a contract for its publication dated 27 June 1914, showing that it was written before the war broke out. He saw it as a reflection of the atmosphere of international tension that preceded hostilities.

== Notable performances ==
In 1923 Holst sailed to the United States to conduct A Dirge for Two Veterans and others of his works at the University of Michigan's Ann Arbor Festival. On 22 June 1934, four weeks after Holst's premature and unexpected death, a memorial concert of his music, including A Dirge, was broadcast by the BBC. The BBC Orchestra and Wireless Chorus were conducted by Adrian Boult.

== Criticism ==
Michael Short noted in A Dirge the "restrained intensity of feeling" which he saw as characteristic of Holst's music. He found parallels to its "sad procession" in several other Holst works, and to its trumpet calls in the violent "Mars, Bringer of War" in The Planets. Imogen Holst considered that its "passionate intensity can be heard in every note", and praised its "immense strength and dignity". "The conviction in its relentless rhythm", she wrote, "cuts through the last shreds of a worn-out idiom". 21st-century critics have called Holst's Dirge "powerful", and "very moving", and have counted it "among his finest pieces for voices".

== Recordings ==
- Brown University Glee Club, dir. Erich Kunzel (1960). The Brown University Glee Club (LP). Carillon. LP 114.
- The Mormon Tabernacle Choir, dir. Richard P. Condie (1962). Hymns and Songs of Brotherhood (LP). Columbia. MS 6314.
- The Baccholian Singers of London, dir. Ian Humphris; Philip Jones Brass Ensemble (1975). Holst Choral Music (LP). EMI. CSD 3764.
- Joyful Company of Singers, City of London Sinfonia cond. Richard Hickox (1996). Seven Partsongs, A Choral Fantasia, A Dirge for Two Veterans, Ode to Death (CD). Chandos. CHAN 9437.
