= A Moorside Suite =

Composition by Gustav Holst

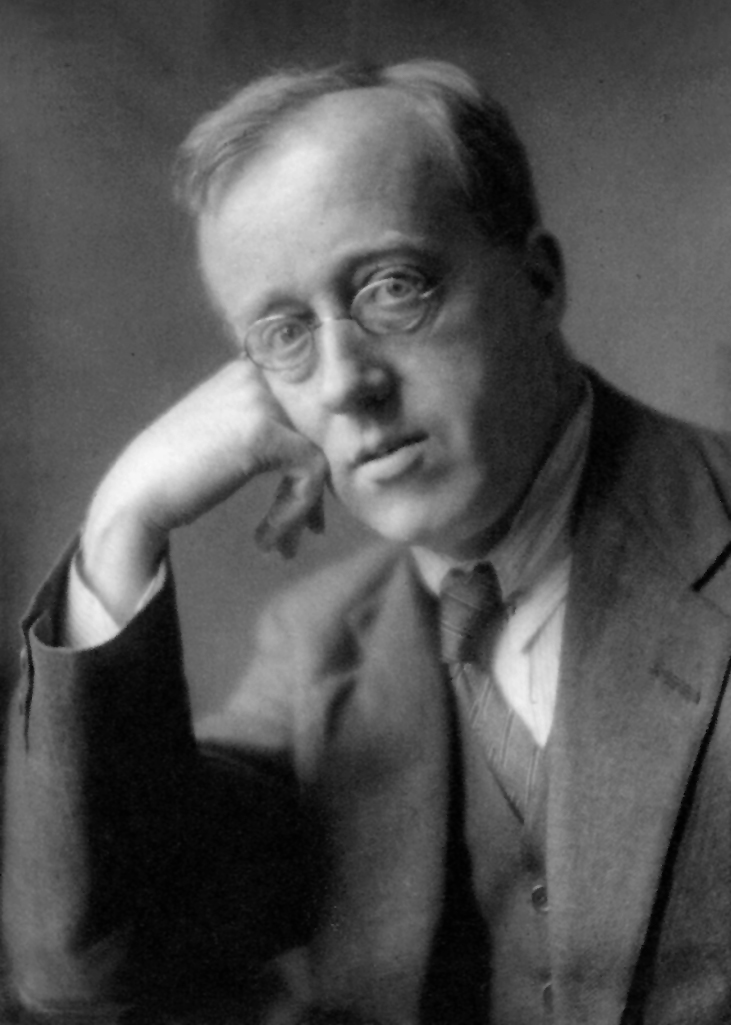
Gustav Holst ca. 1921

A Moorside Suite (H.173) is a work for brass band by the English composer Gustav Holst. It was commissioned by the BBC and the National Brass Band Festival Committee in 1927 for the final of the 1928 National Brass Band Championships of Great Britain at Crystal Palace. The suite comprises three movements - Scherzo, Nocturne and March.

Holst's biographer Michael Short notes that the suite features many of the hallmarks of the mature composer "from the skipping 6/8 of the opening scherzo, to the vigorous melodic fourths of the concluding March, the intervening Nocturne bearing a family resemblance to the slow-moving procession of Saturn [from The Planets suite]."

Holst was himself a trombone player, and had already written works for military band, but this was his first and only work for brass band. The composer attended the competition and heard all 15 performances. The competition was won by the Black Dyke Mills Band conducted by William Halliwell, who also conducted several of the other bands that day. The composer was said to be delighted and wrote to the magazine The British Bandsman "Last Saturday I listened to musicians conducted by musicians". Holst also arranged the "Nocturne" for string orchestra and in 1952 composer Gordon Jacob also arranged the entire suite for strings.

The success of the commission led to a number of new works for brass band by leading British composers of the day being commissioned for the Championship Section Final, many of them now staples of the genre, including Sir Edward Elgar's The Severn Suite (1930), John Ireland's A Downland Suite (1932) and Comedy Overture (1934), Granville Bantock's Prometheus Unbound (1933), Sir Arthur Bliss's suite Kenilworth (1936) and Herbert Howells' suite Pageantry (1937).
