= John Gardner =

John Gardner may refer to:

== Arts and literature ==
- John Gardner (American writer) (1933–1982), American novelist and educator, author of Grendel
- John Gardner (British writer) (1926–2007), British author of spy and mystery novels, former official James Bond author
- John Gardner (composer) (1917–2011), British composer
- John Lowell Gardner (1837–1898), patron of the arts
- John Gardner (boat builder) (1905–1995), American nautical historian

== Law, education and government ==
=== United States ===
- John Gardner (Rhode Island governor) (1697–1764), deputy governor, Colony of Rhode Island
- John Gardner (Continental Congress) (1747–1808), farmer, Rhode Island delegate to Continental Congress
- John A. Gardner, American physicist and developer of Gardner–Salinas braille codes
- John Fentress Gardner (1912–1998), American author and educator
- John J. Gardner (1845–1921), politician representing New Jersey in the House of Representatives, 1885 to 1893
- John W. Gardner (1912–2002), U.S. Secretary of Health, Education, and Welfare during the Great Society
- John P. Gardner (1922–1994), judge and politician in South Carolina

=== Elsewhere ===
- John Gardner (Australian politician) (born 1979), Australian Liberal Party MP for the South Australian seat of Morialta since 2010
- John Gardner (legal philosopher) (1965–2019), formerly professor of jurisprudence at the University of Oxford, England, UK
- John Dunn Gardner (1811–1903), British Member of Parliament, 1841 to 1847

== Sport ==
- John L. Gardner (boxer) (born 1953), British boxer
- John Gardner (footballer) (born 1946), Australian rules footballer
- John Gardner (rugby union) (1870–1909), New Zealand rugby union player
- John Gardner (tennis), Australian tennis player

== Others ==
- John Gardner, known as Akshay Anand, Indian actor of British origin
- John Gardner (minister) (1809–1899), Presbyterian minister in South Australia, Tasmania and Victoria
- John Gardner (Texas Ranger) (1845–1926), Texas Ranger, cowboy, Indian fighter and trail boss
- John Albert Gardner (born 1979), American double murderer
- John D. Gardner, lieutenant general in the U.S. Army
- John L. Gardner (brigadier general) (1793–1869), brigadier general in the US Army
- John Twiname Gardner (1854–1914), English doctor and composer

== See also ==
- Jack Gardner (disambiguation)
- John Gardiner (disambiguation)
- John Gardener (disambiguation)
