= John Gardener =

John Gardener may refer to:

- John Gardener (died 1402), MP for New Romney
- John Gardener (MP for Melcombe Regis), in 1417, MP for Melcombe Regis
- John Gardener (diplomat) (1897–1985), British diplomat

== See also ==
- John Gardiner (disambiguation)
- John Gardner (disambiguation)
