= Thaxted Parish Church =

- Church of Saint John the Baptist with Our Lady and Saint Laurence
- "The Cathedral of Essex"
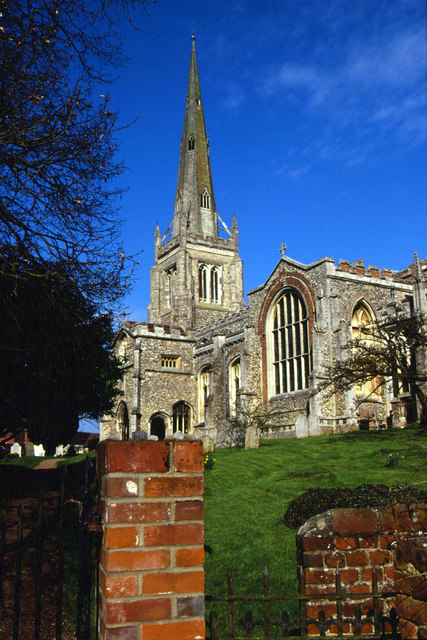
- Thaxted Church, with its spire and south porch, viewed from the top of Stony Lane
- Thaxted Parish Church
- 51.954319°N 0.342295°E
- OS grid reference: TL 61044 31014
- Location: Thaxted, Essex
- Country: England
- Denomination: Church of England
- Previous denomination: Catholicism
- Website: www.ttsrh.org/thaxted

History
- Dedication: Saint John the Baptist; Our Lady; Saint Laurence

Architecture
- Heritage designation: Grade I listed building
- Architectural type: Church
- Style: English Perpendicular
- Years built: c. 1340 to c. 1510

Specifications
- Length: 183 feet (56 m)
- Width: 87 feet (27 m)

Administration
- Province: Canterbury
- Diocese: Chelmsford
- Archdeaconry: Stansted
- Deanery: Saffron Walden
- Benefice: Thaxted, The Sampfords, Radwinter and Hempstead
- Parish: Thaxted

Clergy
- Rector: Vacant

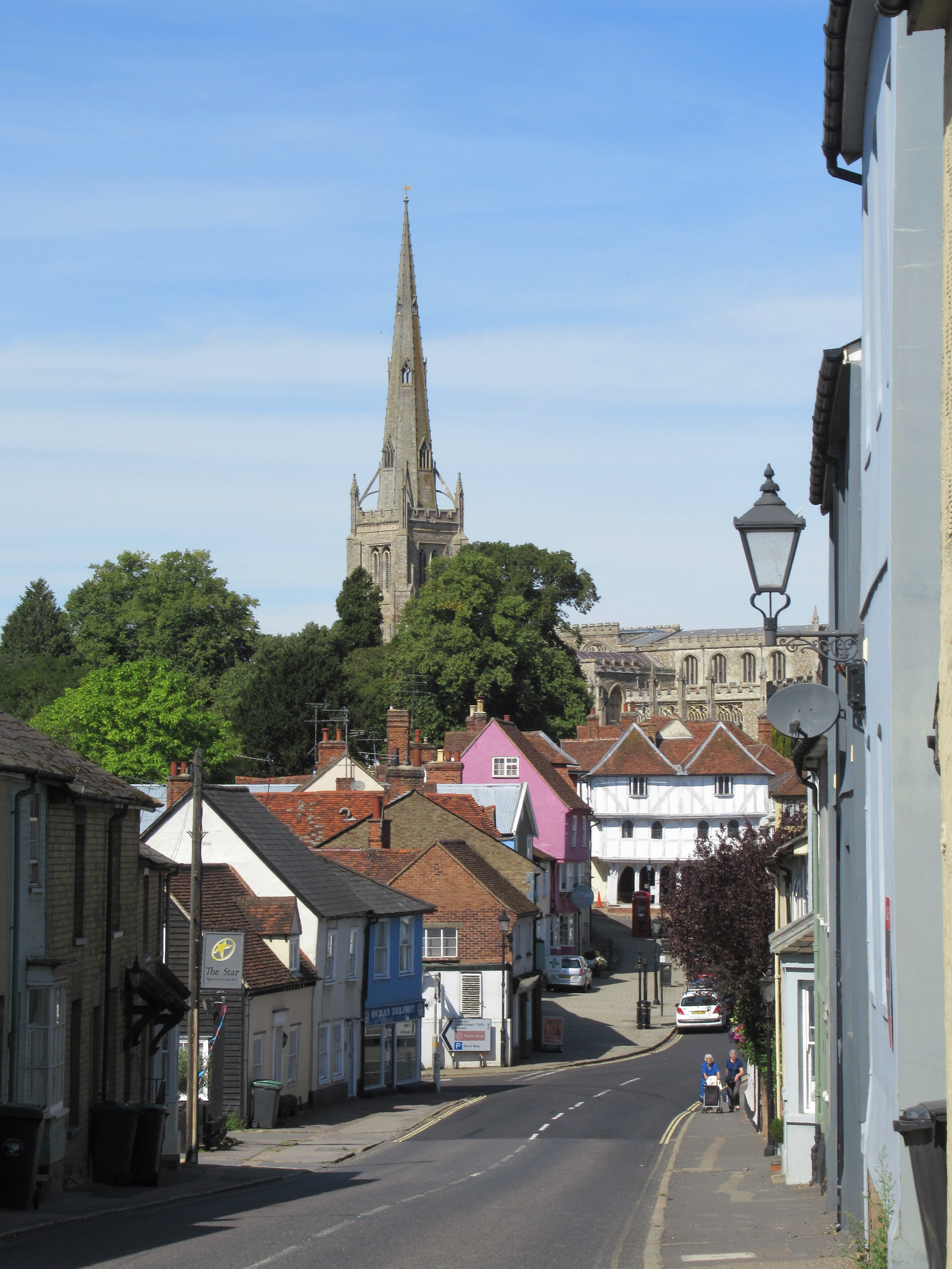
Thaxted Church, commanding the town with its Guildhall

The Church of Saint John the Baptist with Our Lady and Saint Laurence is the parish church of the town of Thaxted in Essex, England. The present church was built over an extended period between c. 1380 and 1510 in the English Perpendicular style. Sitting on top of a hill with a slender spire reaching 181 feet (55 m) high, the church is one of the largest in the county, overlooking the town and the surrounding countryside. Its size is an indication of the former prosperity of the town, because of the medieval cutlery and wool trades that once flourished here. The church has earned the epithet "the Cathedral of Essex". The church is a Grade I Listed Building on the National Heritage List.

"The town of Thaxted is the queen of Essex and her crown is the church. The steeple stands out over the surrounding fields. The town streets all seem to bend in its direction over ancient cobbles and past timber framed houses." — Simon Jenkins, Country Churches, Penguin English Journeys, 2009, p.36.

Since 13 June 2017, the Benefice of Thaxted has been joined with that of the Sampfords, Radwinter and Hempstead. Since 1914, the church parish has formed part of the Diocese of Chelmsford, but previously it has been in the dioceses of London (foundation to 1846), Rochester (1846–77) and Saint Albans (1877–1914).

== History ==
=== Origins ===
There has been a Christian church in Thaxted since Saxon times. The first documented reference to a church in the settlement is in the Liber Eliensis, regarding a gift of land in "Thacstede" to the abbey at Ely by a woman named Æthelgifu sometime between 981 and 1016. It states that the will, written in English, was kept in the church there as evidence. An early church was said to have been dedicated to Saint Catherine and its foundations were reportedly found in the eighteenth century at Rails Farm, not far from the present church site. There is also evidence that the current building stands on the site of an earlier church, and that traces of this church were found under the chancel.

Why a modest settlement such as Thaxted in the fourteenth century should have embarked upon building such a grandiose structure has long been a matter of debate and conjecture. A number of factors may have played a part: a dispute between the vicar and the monks of Tilty Abbey over tithes allowed the considerable sums previously donated to the abbey by the town to be diverted to the parish church, at a time when the town was beginning to prosper as a centre of the cutlery industry. The inhabitants were therefore able to organise and contribute towards the financing of a major church building project, even if the support of rich benefactors was still necessary. During the period when construction began, many small donations of land were made to the borough, which were immediately sold, presumably for the purpose of funding the new structure. The appointment of four churchwardens is taken as an indication that the town was managing funds for construction.

The construction was sponsored by a number of noble patrons descended from the Clare family who had held the manor of Thaxted since the Norman Conquest: Elizabeth, Lady Clare (1295–1360); Lionel, Duke of Clarence (1338–68); Edmund Mortimer, 3rd Earl of March (1352–81); his grandson, Edmund Mortimer, 5th Earl of March (1391–1425); and King Edward IV (1442–83).

=== Construction ===
The current church was built over an extended period from the mid-fourteenth century to the first quarter of the sixteenth century, probably on the site of an earlier church. The earliest parts of the present building date from c. 1340 and substantial building works were completed by c.1510. Foundations of the earlier structure were apparently discovered under the entrance to the Chancel. Some have theorized that these remains, and the late construction of the Chancel, show that the older building remained in place until most of the new structure had been completed.

The precise order in which the church was completed is hard to confirm, but the following is based on the survey by the Royal Commission on Historic Monuments:

1. nave with north and south aisles (c.1340 or earlier)
2. south transept and widening of south aisle (c.1360–1380)
3. south porch (c.1380)
4. north transept (c.1380–1420)
5. north porch and widening of the north aisle (c.1445)
6. west tower and spire (c.1475–1500)
7. chancel, north and south chapels, crossing arches and nave clerestory (c.1510)

It has been conjectured that the original plan for the building included a central tower over the crossing, and that this tower may have fallen.

=== Restoration over the centuries ===
The building has been restored periodically, but, according to Pevsner, "care has always been taken and [...] not much has been changed". As early as 1561, the Lord Treasurer was requested to provide funds to repair and maintain "such fair edifice, builded of good zeal and devotion of our Predecessors".

Parts of the building were damaged by storms in 1757, 1763, 1764 and, most catastrophically, in 1814. During the summer of that year, the spire had been partially dismantled by 45 feet (13.7 m) after being struck by lightning and scaffolding erected to support reconstruction. On 16 December 1814, a "hurricane" brought the scaffolding and 30 feet (9.1 m) more of the spire down onto the church roof, causing extensive damage. The decision to rebuild the spire according to its original design was taken by the churchwardens in 1820 and tender notices appeared in the press. Reconstruction was complete by 1822, with funds from Sir William Smyth.

The arts and crafts architect, Randall Wells, undertook renovation work in 1909–10, removing cement rendering placed on the exterior during earlier restorations, and strengthening the foundations of the west tower. Further restoration has continued with fundraising undertaken by the Friends of Thaxted Church.

=== Clerical disputes and controversies ===
The church, and its clergy, have been at the centre of some controversies over the centuries. The presbytery (the residence for the parish priest) had been endowed by the Bishop of London, Roger Niger, in the thirteenth century, maintained by the monks of Stoke-by-Clare. The origins of the construction of the present church can be traced to a dispute in 1314 between the then parish priest, William, and the monks of Tilty Abbey, who refused to support the benefice financially. The priest sued but, threatened with excommunication, withdrew his suit and the increasingly prosperous parishioners resolved to support the church by other means, resulting in an influx of funds, including from Lady Clare, that allowed the rebuilding programme to begin.

In the first decade of the fifteenth century, Thaxted became a hotbed of Lollardy and its priest, William, was persecuted for heretical preaching. Several Thaxted residents participated in Oldcastle's Revolt in January 1411. In 1430, a "prest of Thaksted" was burnt at Smithfield.

In 1647, during the English Civil War, the appointment of a Laudian vicar, Samuel Hall, nominated by Lady Maynard who held the advowson for the benefice, was opposed by Presbyterian Roundhead supporters in the town and blocked by the Parliamentary Committee for Plundered Ministers. Opposition to the move and support for Rev. Hall resulted in an incident, described as a "great fight", in the church when some parishioners attempted to obstruct the sequestrators from ejecting their preferred vicar. Hearings were held before the House of Lords and a Puritan candidate, James Parkin, prevailed, only to be himself ejected after the Restoration. He remained in the town, helping to establish the strong Dissenting presence in the town during the eighteenth century.

In February 1848, Rev. Thomas Jee, Thaxted's vicar for over 40 years, was charged with assaulting Marian Harvey, the wife of his curate, Rev. Thomas Harvey. The Harveys were living in the vicarage with Rev. Jee but it seems the cohabitation had not gone well. When Rev. Jee refused to be bound over to keep the peace, he spent fourteen days in Springfield Gaol. His return to Thaxted upon his release was greeted by a carriage procession. A month earlier, Rev. Jee had received a nominal fine of one shilling for assaulting his physician, Dr. Barnes, at a dinner party at the vicarage in the company of the Harveys. Dr. Barnes, who described the clergyman of have an "excessively excitable temperament", had accused Jee of indecent misconduct with a ten-year-old girl, whereupon the vicar had seized a poker and threatened the doctor. The court found that Dr. Barnes had "gone out of his way to be vexatious and irritating" and had provoked the incident by his "gross accusation" against the vicar. In a postscript, in April 1848, Dr Barnes eloped with the sixteen-year-old daughter of Rev and Mrs. Harvey, after the family had left the vicarage in Thaxted and moved to Bayswater. Barnes and Miss Harvey were tracked back to Thaxted and Barnes was charged with abduction. Barnes was acquitted at the Old Bailey when it was ruled that the marriage was legal.

In 1922, the Church gained national notoriety as the venue for the so-called "Battle of the Flags", after the vicar, Conrad Noel, hung the Red Flag, and the Tricolour of Sinn Féin alongside the Union Flag in the church. After a group of Cambridge University students took the flags down, a tussle developed over several years between supporters and opponents of the "Red Vicar". Noel was a Christian Socialist and defended his right to fly the flags, but eventually the church authorities ordered their removal. The existence of a radical vicar supported by an essentially conservative town gave rise to the notion of "the Thaxted tradition" with a series of such appointments until the 1980s. Conrad's successor as vicar was his son-in-law, Jack Putterill, whose sermons were highly political and who engaged with left-wing causes.

In 1976, the vicar, Peter Elers, declared his homosexuality, which left the "community divided on whether sexual politics represented an extension of, or diversion from, Thaxted's long-standing progressivism." A private ceremony to bless a female same-sex couple in the church was reported as a gay "wedding", resulting in an investigation by the Church of England and calls for him to resign.

=== Candidature for cathedral status ===
Thaxted Church has sometimes been described as the "Cathedral of Essex". At the beginning of the twentieth century, it was briefly considered as the seat of a new bishopric that was being planned to alleviate the burden on the Diocese of Saint Albans. In 1906, Bishop Edgar Jacob invited aspiring churches to submit applications. Seven churches entered the race. Thaxted's suitability was hampered by poor transport communications and the reluctance of Lady Warwick to give up her patronage of the church living (advowson). The fact that it was the only candidate church that would not have required structural alterations to expand capacity speaks to the grandeur of the building in relation to other parish churches in the country. Eventually Chelmsford was chosen as the site of the new cathedral.

== Architecture ==
For a more detailed description of the architectural features of the church, see the 1916 Essex Inventory of the Royal Commission of Historical Monuments.

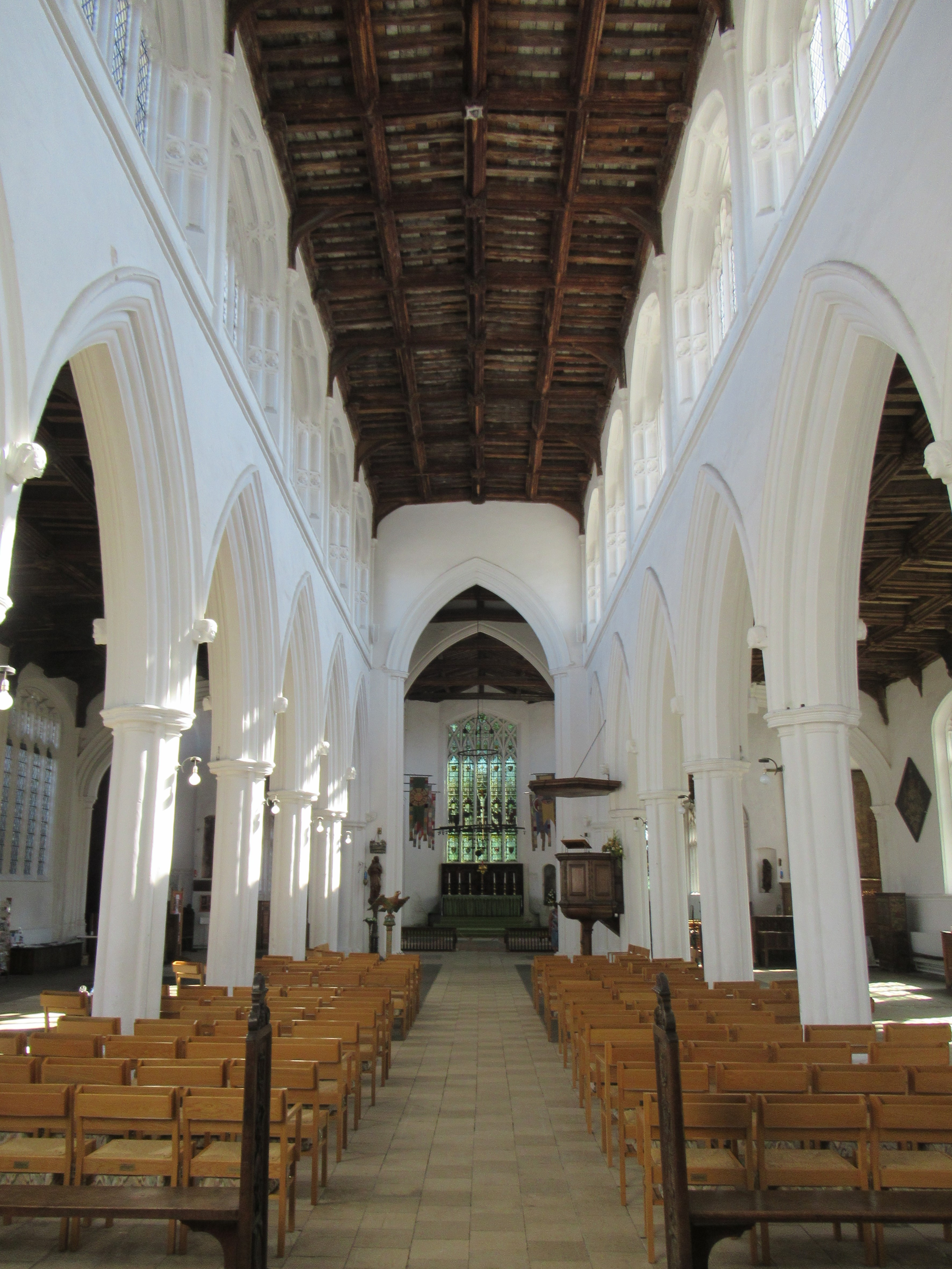
Thaxted Church, nave looking east

The church is an example of the English perpendicular style of medieval Gothic ecclesiastical architecture. Pevsner described it as "proud, spacious, clear and a little frigid inside, and outside dominated by its splendid tall steeple". The exterior is built of limestone with flint rubble infill, embattled and buttressed, each buttress pinnacled and possessing a gargoyle. The exterior is decorated with carved ornamentation, friezes and grotesques.

The west tower, which houses the bells and supports the spire, dates from the fifteenth century, with extensive repairs in the eighteenth and nineteenth centuries. The tower is 17 square feet (1.6 m^{2}) square and has four buttressed stages and a panelled and embattled parapet. The 181 feet (55.2 m) high spire is supported by flying buttresses and is punctuated by three sets of windows or lights, the bottom pair mullioned into three, the middle pair mullioned into two and the top single. The tower is surmounted by a golden weather vane.

There are two entrance porches, each with two storeys. The south, or Duke's Porch, was given by Lionel, Duke of Clarence and is marked with his coronet. It is the earlier of the two porches, built between 1362 and 1368. It has a star-shaped tierceron vault and two smaller side entrances. The north, or King's Porch, was given to the church by King Edward IV and bears his arms. It is the taller and more elaborate of the two, with a ribbed vault with liernes and bosses, a castellated turret and, above the entrance, two escutcheons, carved niches and a figure-frieze. At the top, underneath the pinnacles on each side is a carved wodewose or savage man holding a club. The room above the north porch was dedicated by Conrad Noel as a chapel to John Ball, a leader of the Peasants' Revolt. The church is usually entered through the North Porch, off Watling Street.

The north and south arcades date to c. 1340, making them the oldest part of the present structure, each of six bays. The piers are quatrefoil. The nave is 85.5 feet (26 m) long by 18.5 feet (6 m) wide and also dates from c. 1340, if not earlier. The flat-pitched wooden roof throughout the church is original, with bosses carved with heads, angels and foliage. The great arch and vault of the west tower date from the fifteenth century: the groined vault has the arms of March and Ulster. The clerestory was added in the early sixteenth century in the final phase of building.

Both the north aisle and the south aisle are wider than the nave, having been widened when the porches were constructed. The roof of both aisles include carved bosses, some showing the crests of possible donors.

There is a reredos set into the east wall of the north transept with ogee-headed niches and a frieze above depicting Christ between censing angels. The south transept was probably once a chapel dedicated to Saint Catherine, as indicated by the carved Catherine wheels above the columns.

The chancel, with its north and south aisles, and clerestory are the newest part of the building completed before 1510. The clerestory windows may be replacements after the 1757 storm damaged the originals. The east window contains five lights. The chancel aisles are dedicated as chapels, the Chapel of St Thomas of Canterbury, or the Becket Chapel, to the north and the Chapel of Our Lady and St Anne, or the Lady Chapel, to the south.

== Fittings ==
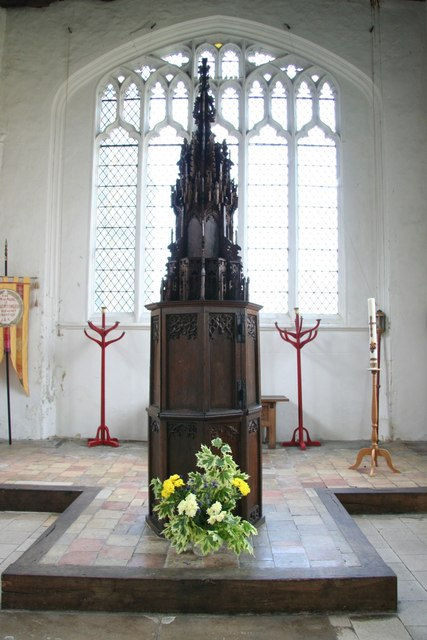
Carved fifteenth century wooden font case and cover, Thaxted Parish Church, Essex

The font, with an elaborate late fifteenth-century wooden case and cover, stands in the north-western corner of the North Aisle. The hexagonal oak pulpit, with its carved foliage and canopy, is from the 1680s.

Some of the stained glass in the church is from the fourteenth and fifteenth centuries. The oldest depicts a knight (possibly Edmund, Earl of March) in the south transept and is dated about 1341. In the South Aisle, there is fifteenth century glass showing the figures of Adam and Eve, whilst in the North Aisle, fragments of surviving glass have been set in the window, including images of Saint Christopher, a watermill and a ship. The east windows in the Chancel and the Becket Chapel date from 1900 and are by C. E. Kempe, a noted Victorian glazier.

The church contains two organs. The Lincoln Organ, a rare unaltered Georgian instrument, occupies the chapel in the north transept. It was built in 1821 by Henry Cephas Lincoln for St John's Chapel, Bedford Row, London, and later was moved to Thaxted. It been fully restored to working order and is used for recitals and events. The smaller Conrad Noel Memorial Organ was installed, under the arch to the West Tower from the nave, in 1952 with funds raised on the death of the former vicar, Conrad Noel. It was built by the local Thaxted-based organ maker, Cedric Arnold.

The large Stella, or star-shaped candelabra, hanging in the central crossing, is by Randall Wells and was originally designed for St Mary's Primrose Hill but never installed. It was installed at Thaxted in 1911 by Conrad Noel and represents the genealogy of Christ in Matthew 1:1–17.

The early German or French statue of the Madonna in the South Transept was a gift from the artist Fred Uhlman.

== Monuments and noteworthy associations ==
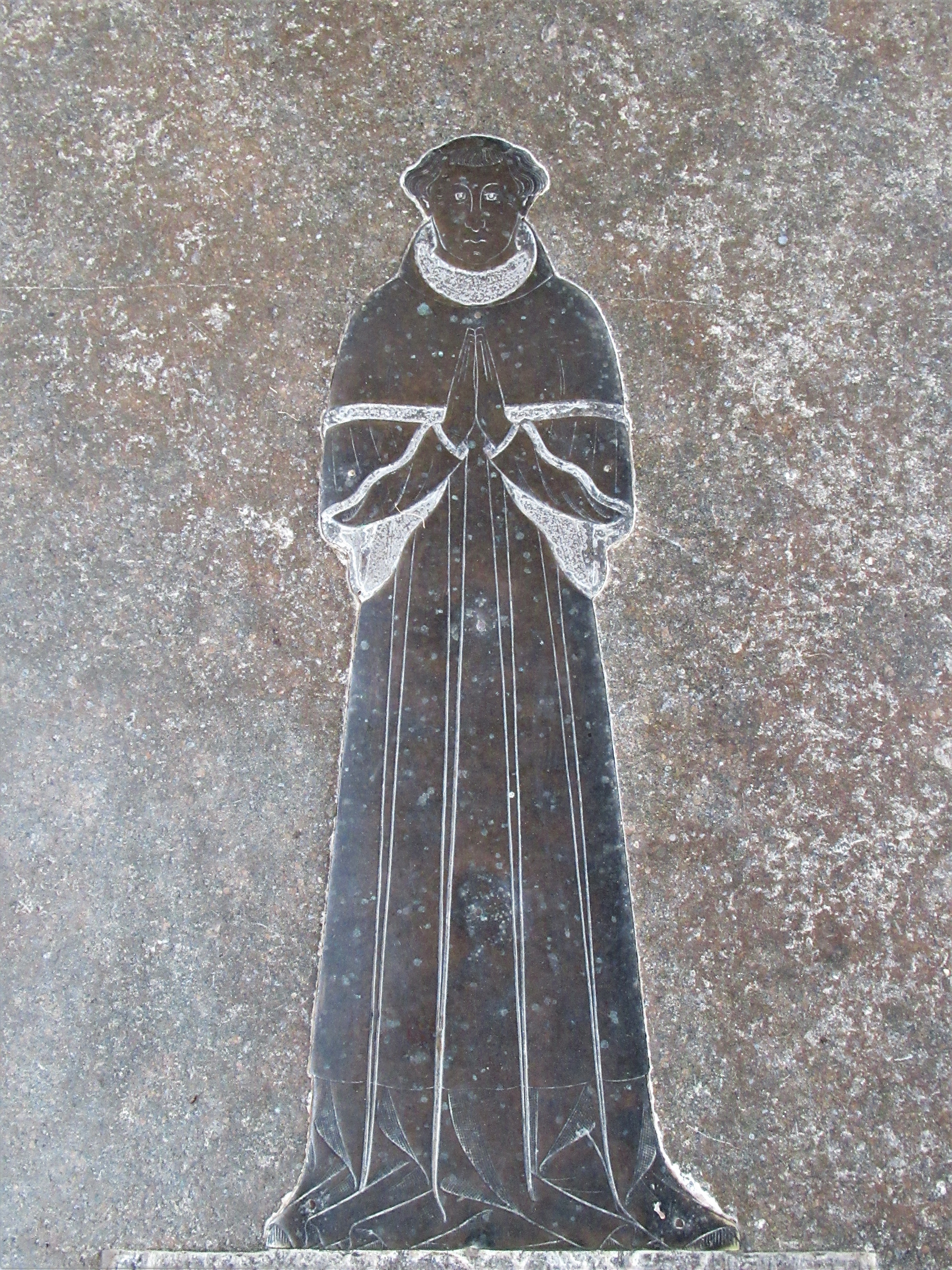
Brass of fifteenth century priest, reputed to be of Robert Wydow, who was vicar of Thaxted from 1481 to 1489.

A surviving mid-fifteenth century brass of a priest on the floor of the cancel is said to represent Robert Wydow (c.1446–1505), a fifteenth-century poet, musician and clergyman, who was born in Thaxted and held the benefice of the church from 1481 to 1489. There are a number of other memorial slabs in the floors of the Chancel and the Crossing.

The Royal Arms of Queen Anne, predating the Act of Union, hang above the south door. Painted on a wooden panel, it was restored in 1980.

A five-foot high carved statue of St Francis of Assisi set in the east wall of the north transept commemorates Eric Makeham, who was killed in 1917 at Messines Ridge. His name also appears on the Menin Gate Memorial at Ypres. In the churchyard is the war grave of Private Edward Stamfield Brown of the Manchester Regiment, who died in January 1919.

There is a bronze bust of Conrad Noel mounted on a shelf in the Crossing by the sculptor Gertrude Hermes.

Affixed to the north outside wall of the church tower is a large stone plaque inscribed with the words:

IN GRATEFUL MEMORY of THOSE MEN AND WOMEN OF THAXTED WHO HAVE GIVEN THEIR LIVES IN THE SERVICE OF OTHERS & IN THE CAUSE OF FREEDOM May they rest in peace

This plaque serves as Thaxted's war memorial, although there have been long-standing discussions about erecting a more substantial war memorial in the town.

The composer, Gustav Holst, served as church organist during his residence in Thaxted from 1917 to 1925. He organised an annual Whitsun Festival in the church for several years and composed many settings of hymns and carols for use in the church, including the well-known tune for the hymn "I Vow To Thee My Country" which carries the name Thaxted.

== Bells ==
There is a ring of eight bells. The oldest bells (Nos. 6 and 7) were cast in 1734 by Thomas Gardiner of Sudbury. The treble (No.1), the tenor (No. 8) and No. 2 were cast in 1778 by Mears & Company at the famous Whitechapel Bell Foundry in London. The remaining four were cast in the 1940s by Gillett and Johnston.

These four new bells were given particular emblems: No.3 is the Justice Bell, No. 5 is the Peace Bell, No. 7 is the Craft Bell, and No. 4 is the Dance Bell. The latter carries the inscription: 'I ring for the general dance' - a paraphrasing of a line from the carol, Tomorrow Shall Be My Dancing Day, that Gustav Holst set to music for the Thaxted Church Choir. The new bells were dedicated by the Bishop of Colchester at a service of thanksgiving on 26 March 1949.

Bells of Thaxted Church
No.	Note	Significance	Inscription	Weight
1	E♭	Treble	Recast by voluntary subscription 1778 Mears & Co London fecit	3 cwt 3 qrs 18 lbs
2	D		Raised by voluntary subscription 1778 Mears & Co London fecit	4 cwt 1 qr 22 lbs
3	C	The Justice Bell	He hath made of one blood all Nations I ring for justice in all the Earth And I John saw the Holy City of Jerusalem Coming down from God out of Heaven Prepared as a bride adorned for her husband Recast by voluntary subscription 1778 Mears & Co London fecit Gillett & Johnston Croyden refecit 1949 Jack Putterill – Vicar Stanley Wilson / William Barker – Churchwardens Donors: The People of Thaxted and friends	5 cwt 1 qr 1 lb
4	B♭	The Dance Bell or the Fellowship Bell	I ring for the General Dance Praise him in the cymbals and dances Praise him upon the strings and pipe Tho. Gardiner Sudbury fecit Gillett & Johnston Croyden refecit 1949 Jack Putterill – Vicar Stanley Wilson / William Barker – Churchwardens Donors: The Morris Ring and the Friends of Thaxted	6 cwt 3 qrs 2 lbs
5	A♭	The Peace Bell	Gloria in Excelsis Deo et in Terra Pax Hominibus Bonae Voluntatis I ring for universal peace And I heard a great voice out of heaven saying Behold the Tabernacle of God is with Men And He will dwell with them And they shall be His people And God shall wipe away all tears from their eyes And there shall be no more death Neither sorrow nor crying Neither shall there be any more pain For the former things are passed away And God himself shall be with them, and be their God Tho. Gardiner Sudbury fecit Gillett & Johnston Croyden reflect 1948 Jack Putterill – Vicar Stanley Wilson / William Barker – Churchwardens Donors: Thaxted Church and the Patron	8 cwt 2 qrs 25 lbs
6	G		Ios Saward / Iohn Westwood Church Wardens 1734	9 cwt 3 qrs 4 lbs
7	F	The Craft Bell	Ioseph Saward / Iohn Westwood Church Wardens 1734	12 cwt 1 qr 14 lbs
8	E♭	Tenor	Richard White Vicar Thomas Brand & Mathew Randall Church Wardens 1778 Mears & Co fecit Infactum Sileo Percute Dulce Cano	15 cwt 2 lbs
The three recast bells bear the following symbols: a gridiron, representing Saint Laurence (No. 3); a hand during water surrounded by a halo, representing Saint John the Baptist (No. 4); and a winged heart pierced, representing Our Lady (No. 5)

== Gallery ==
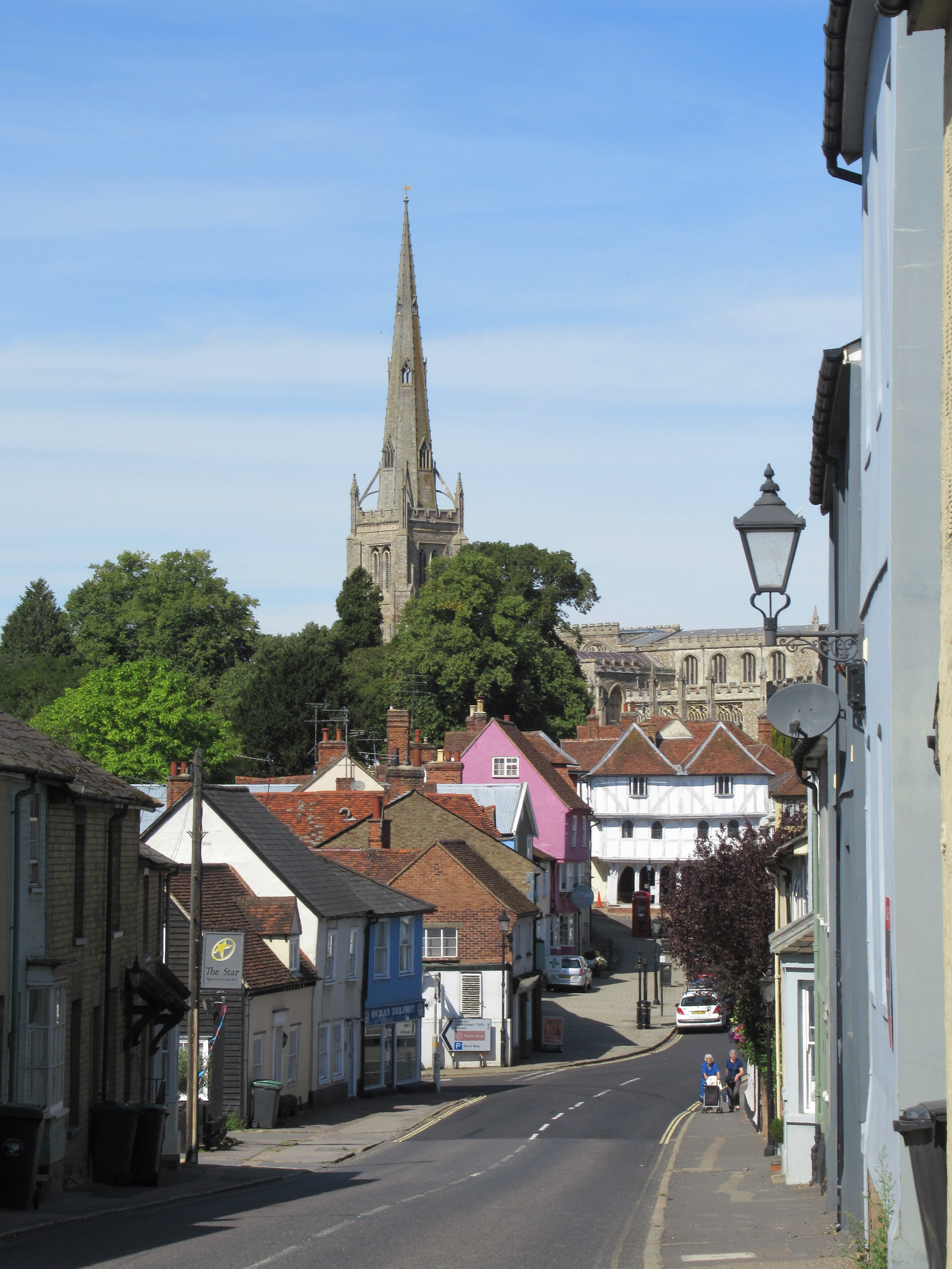
Thaxted Church, dominating the skyline of the town

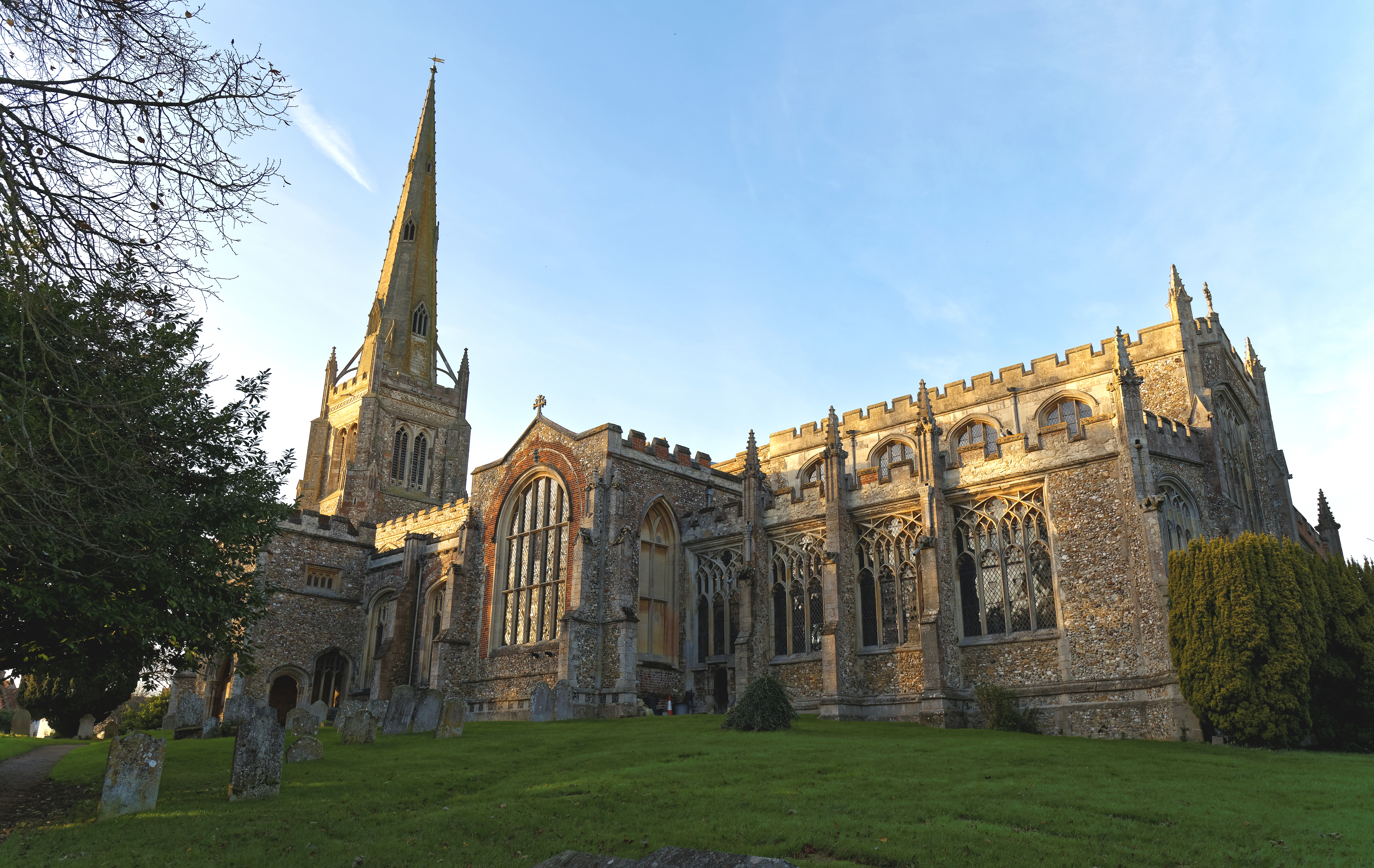
Thaxted Church, from the southeast

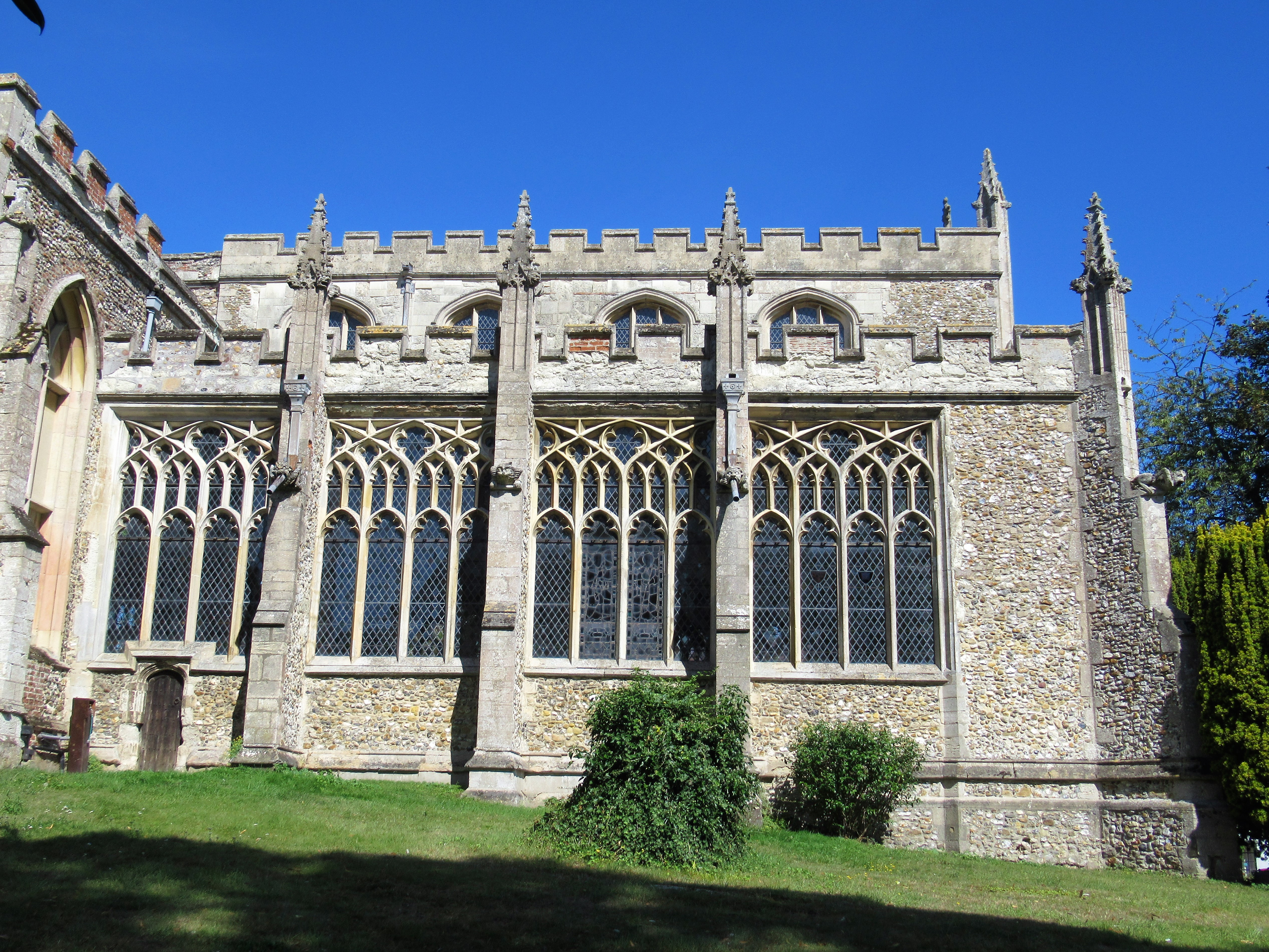
Thaxted Church, east end

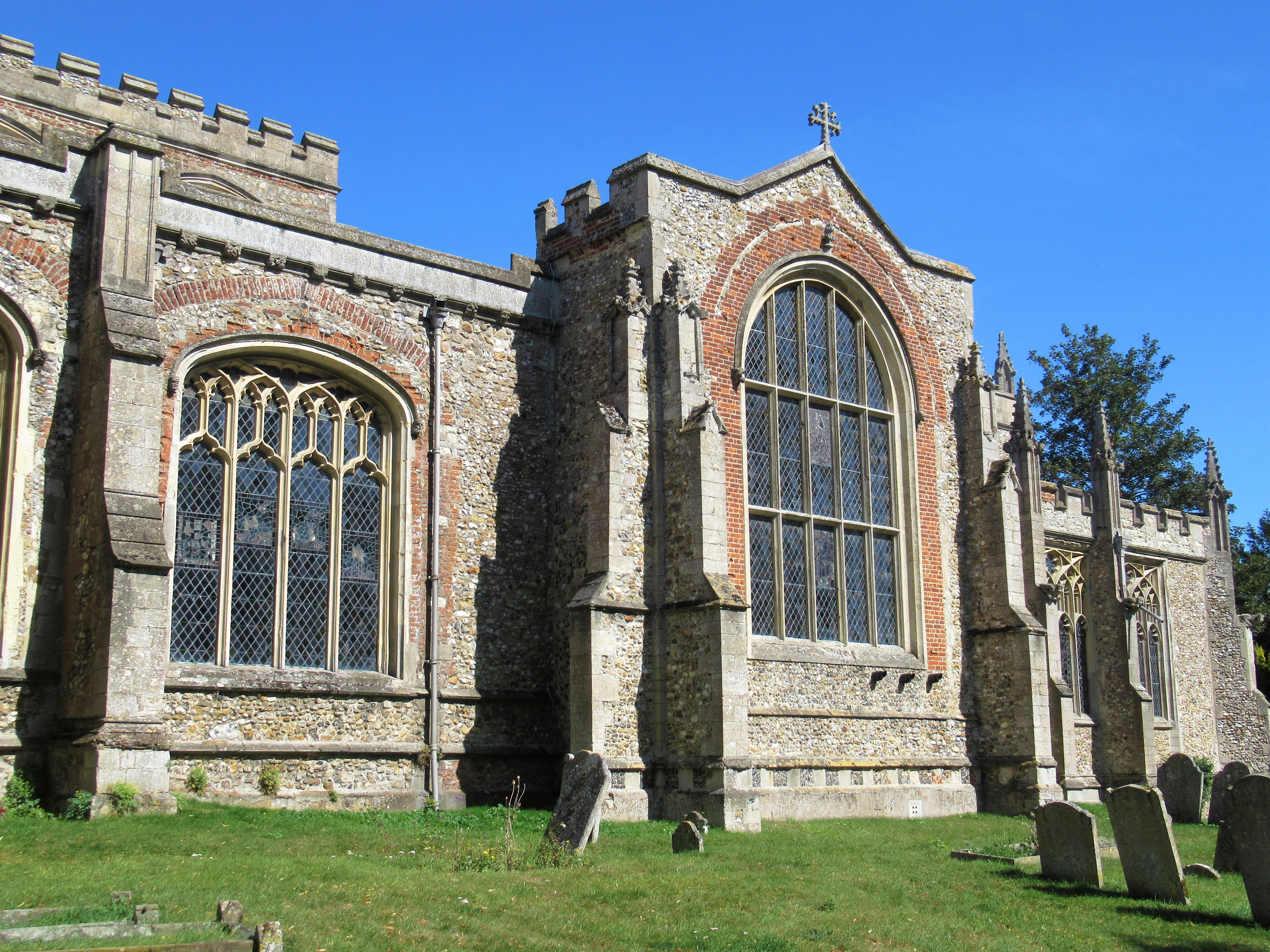
Thaxted Church, South Transept

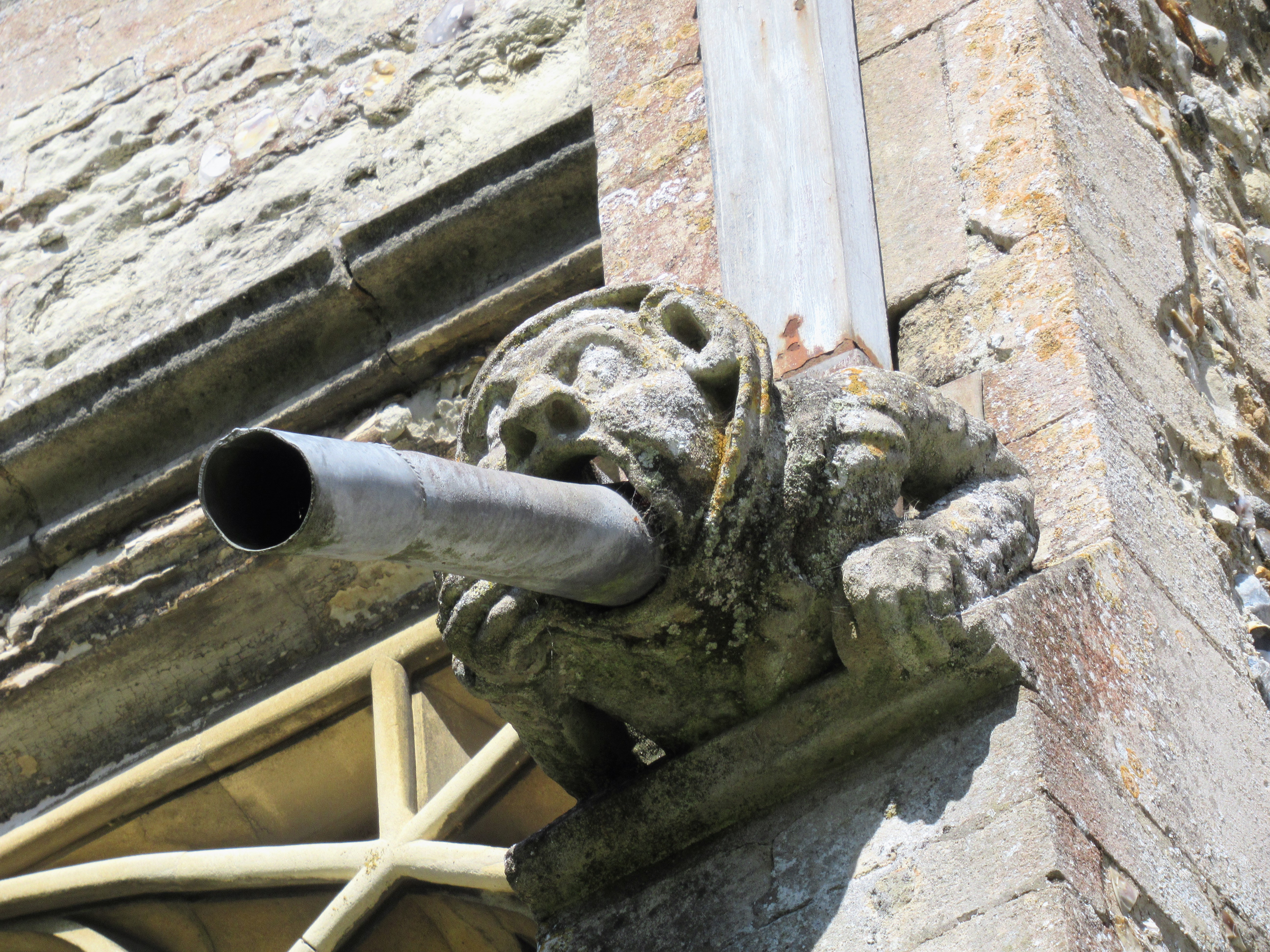
Thaxted Church, gargoyle

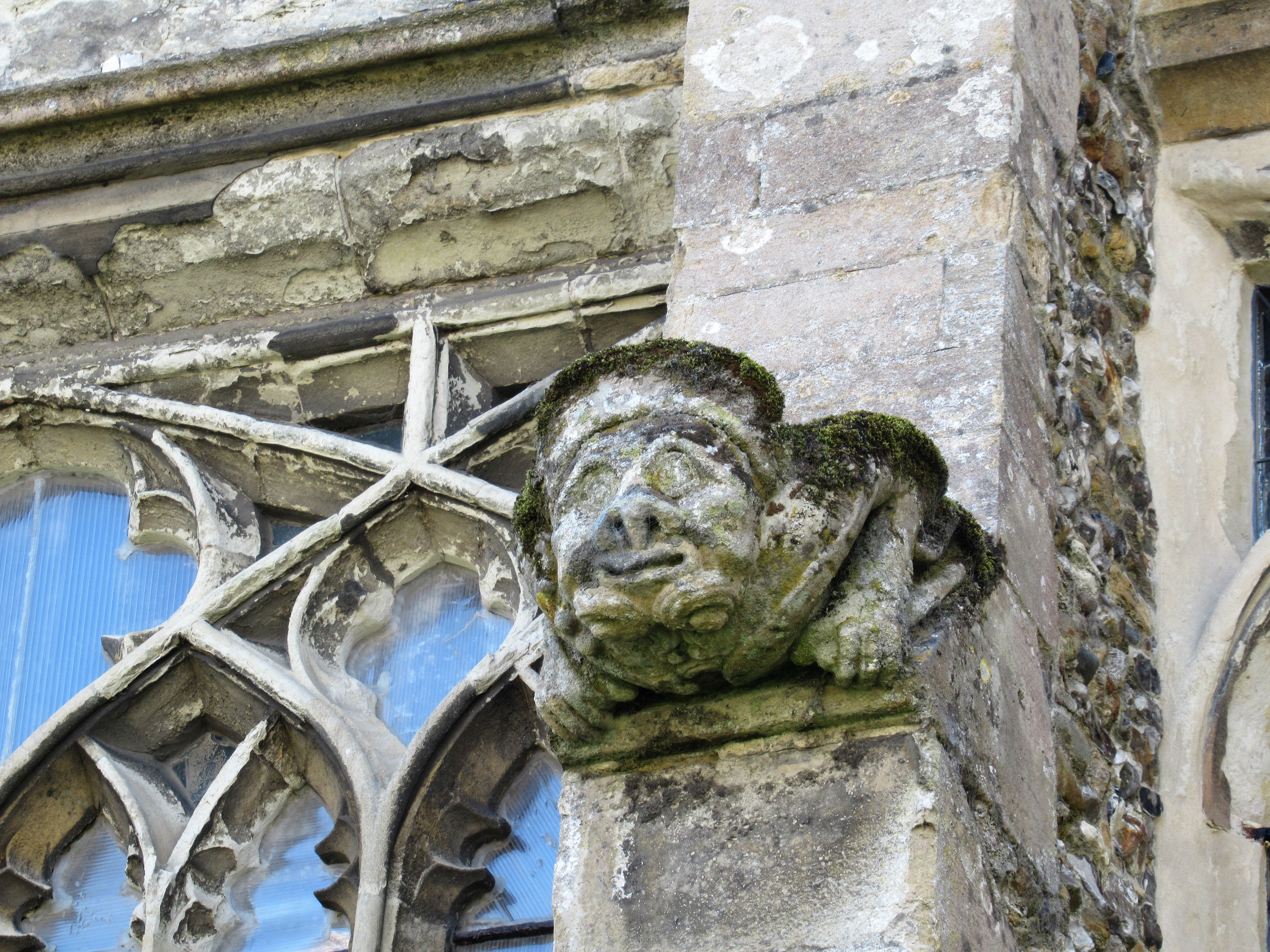
Thaxted Church, grotesque

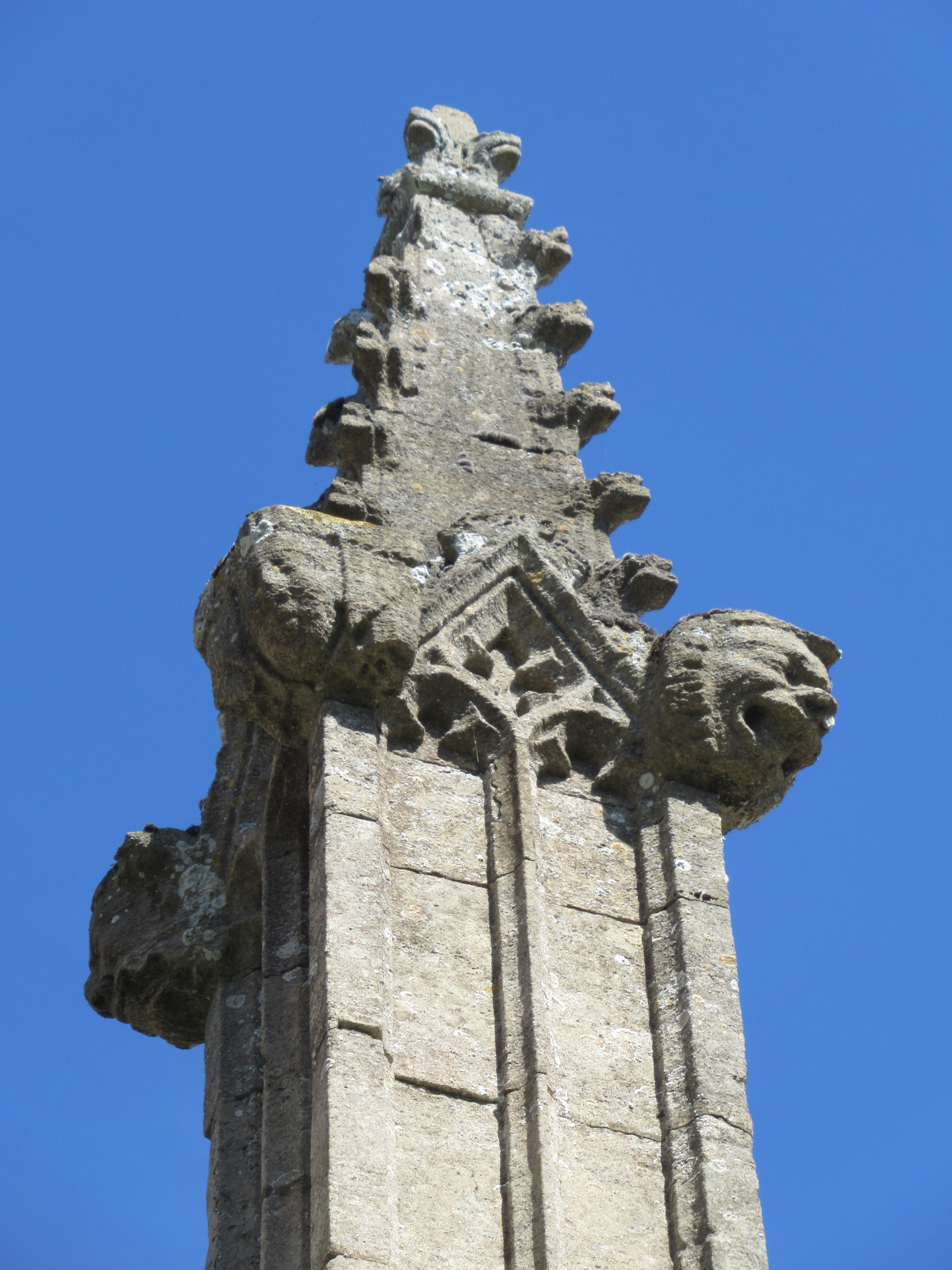
Thaxted Church, Pinnacle

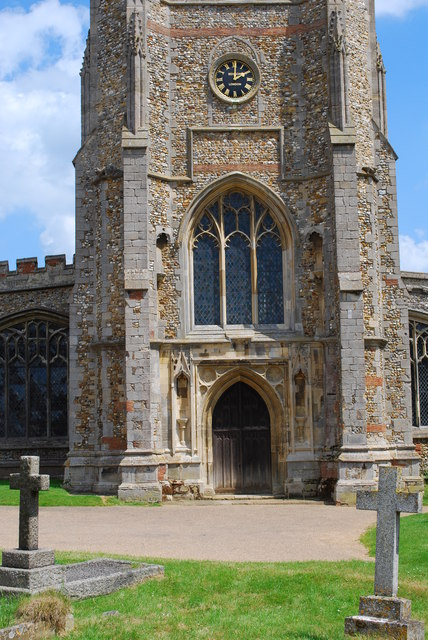
Thaxted Church, Tower and West Door

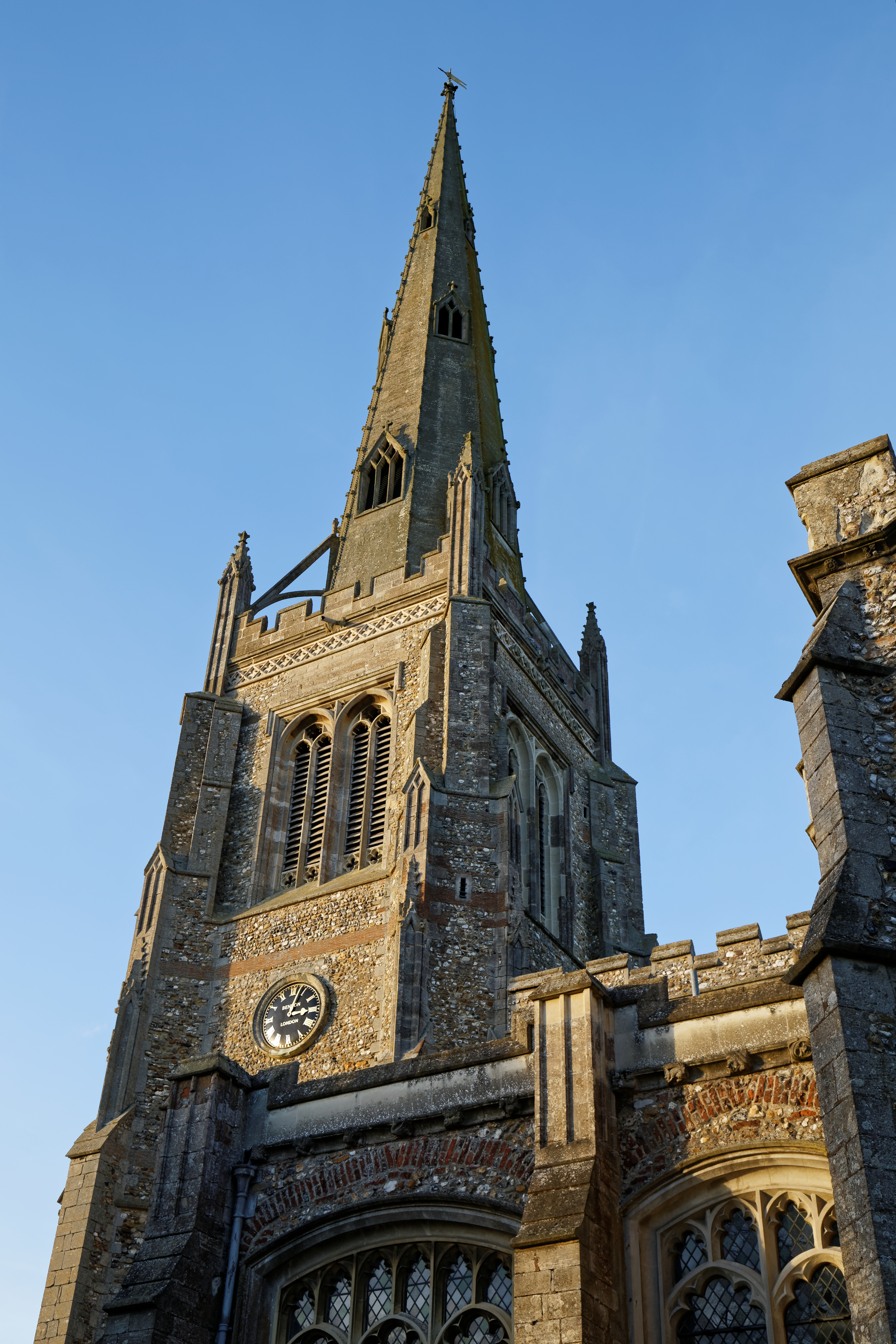
Thaxted Church, Spire from south-east

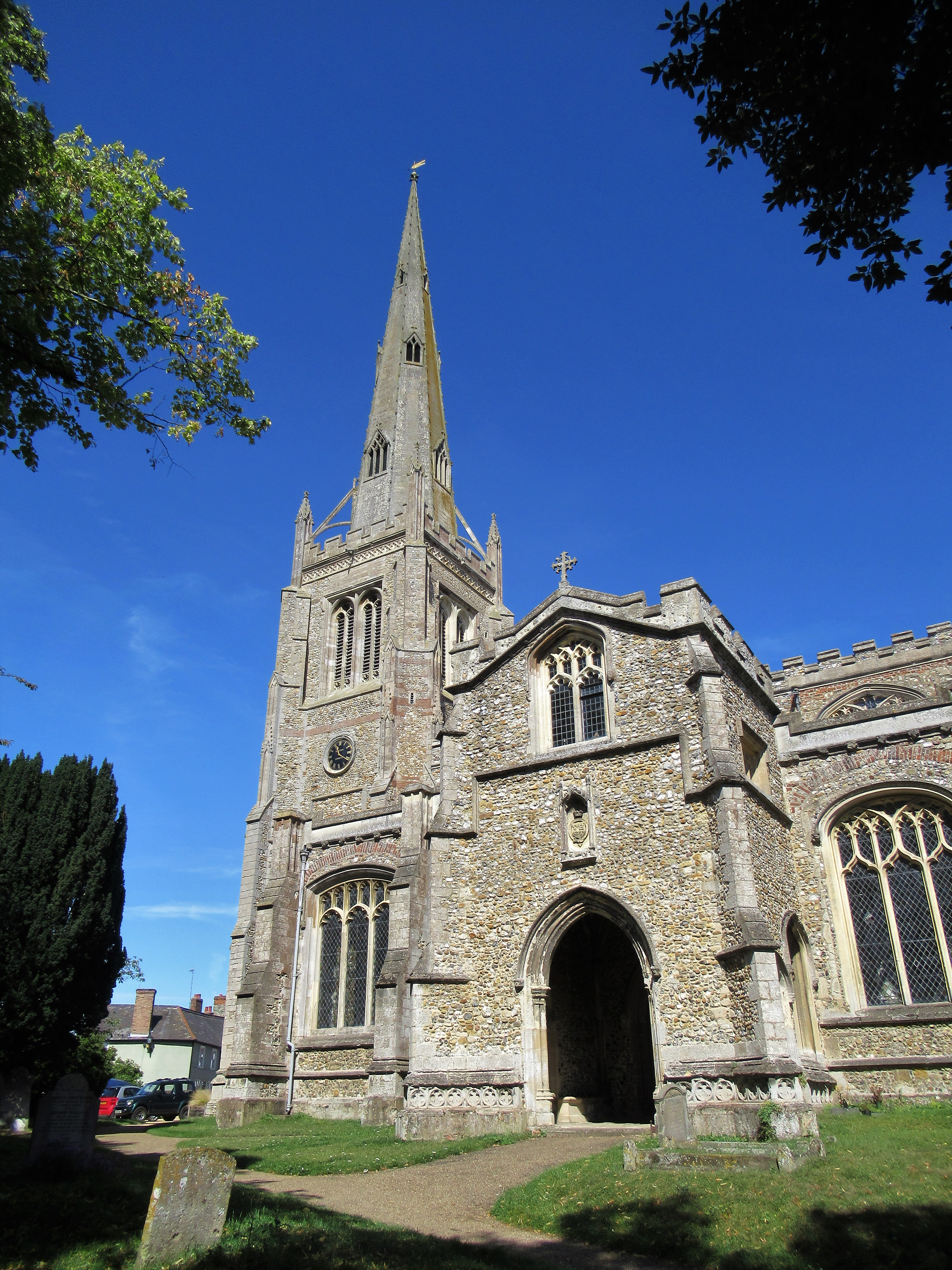
Thaxted Church, Spire and South Porch

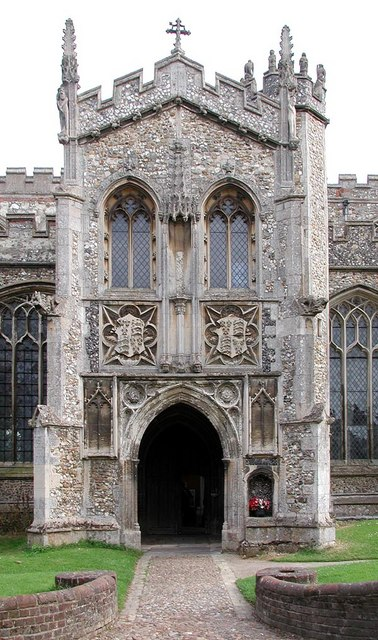
North Porch, Thaxted Church

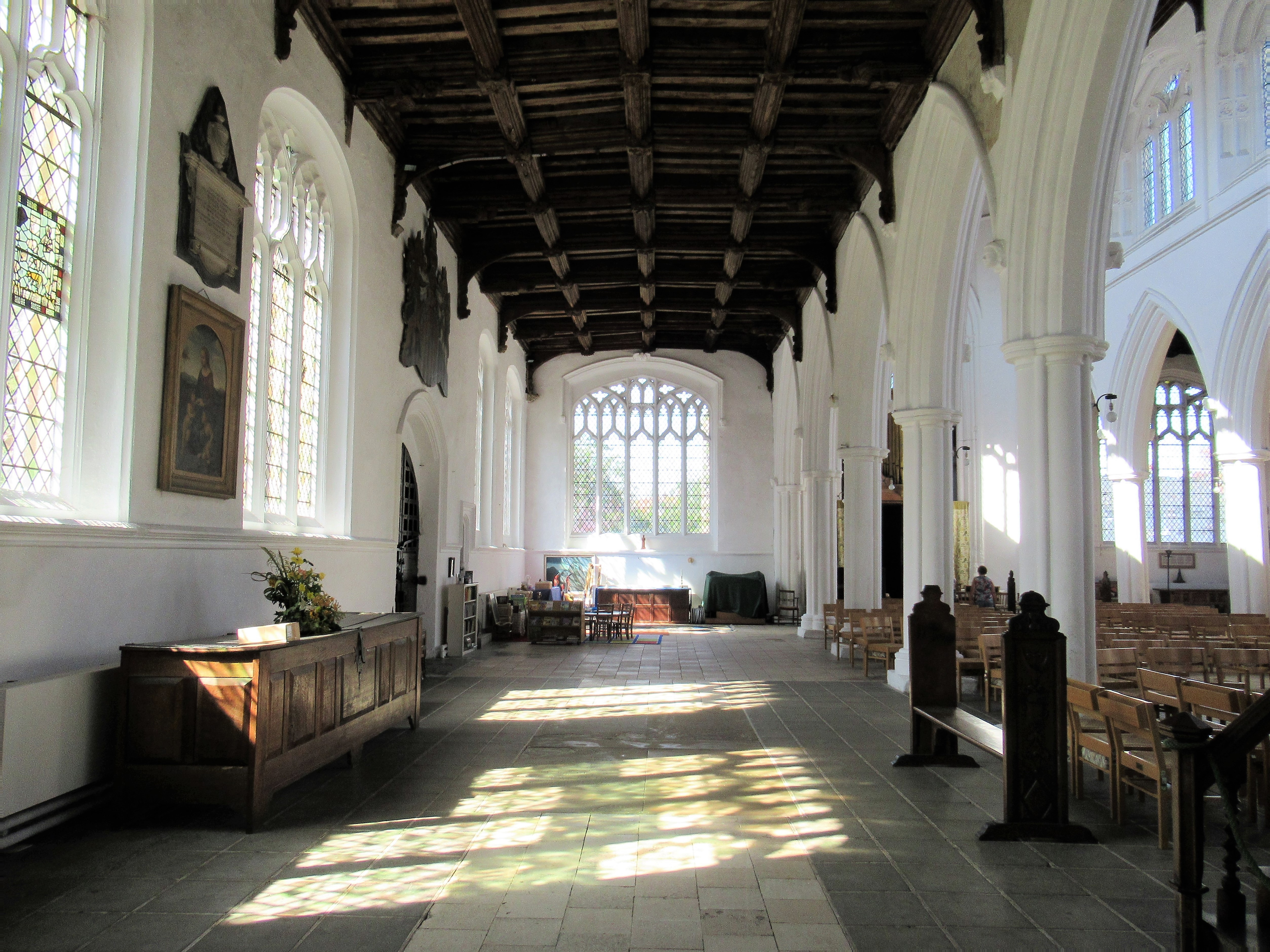
Thaxted Church, South Aisle, looking west

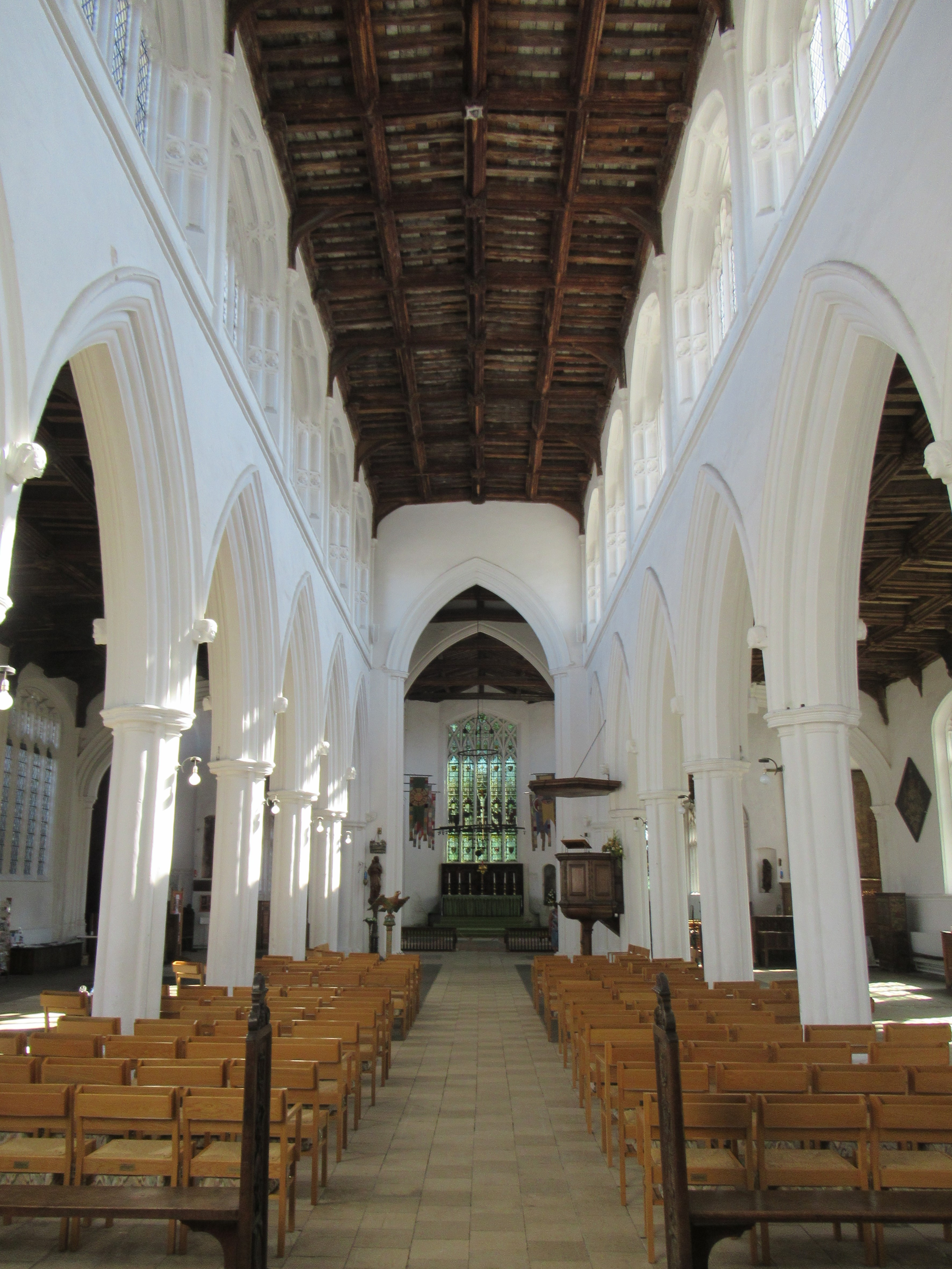
Thaxted Church, Nave, looking east

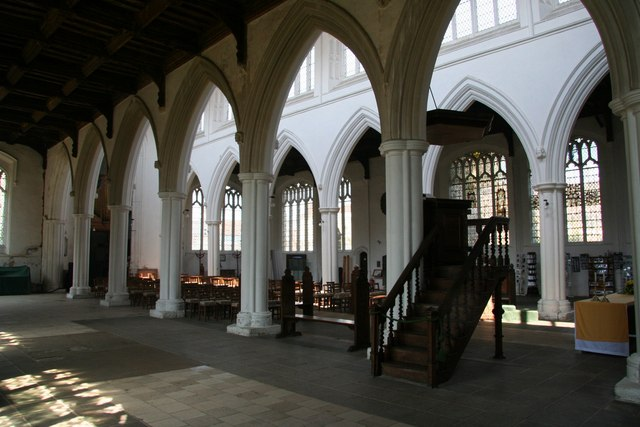
Thaxted Church, nave and pulpit

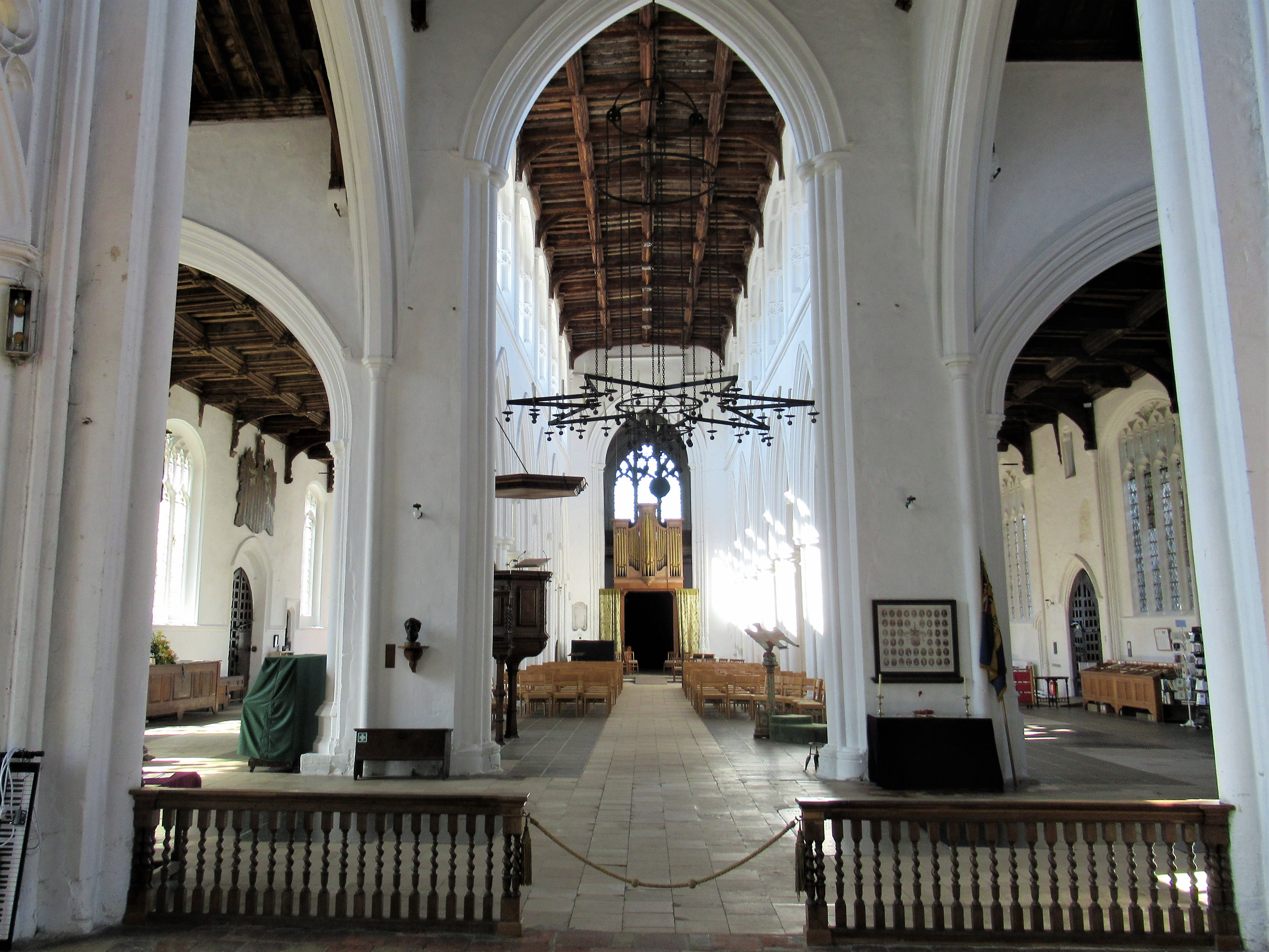
Thaxted Church, Nave, looking west

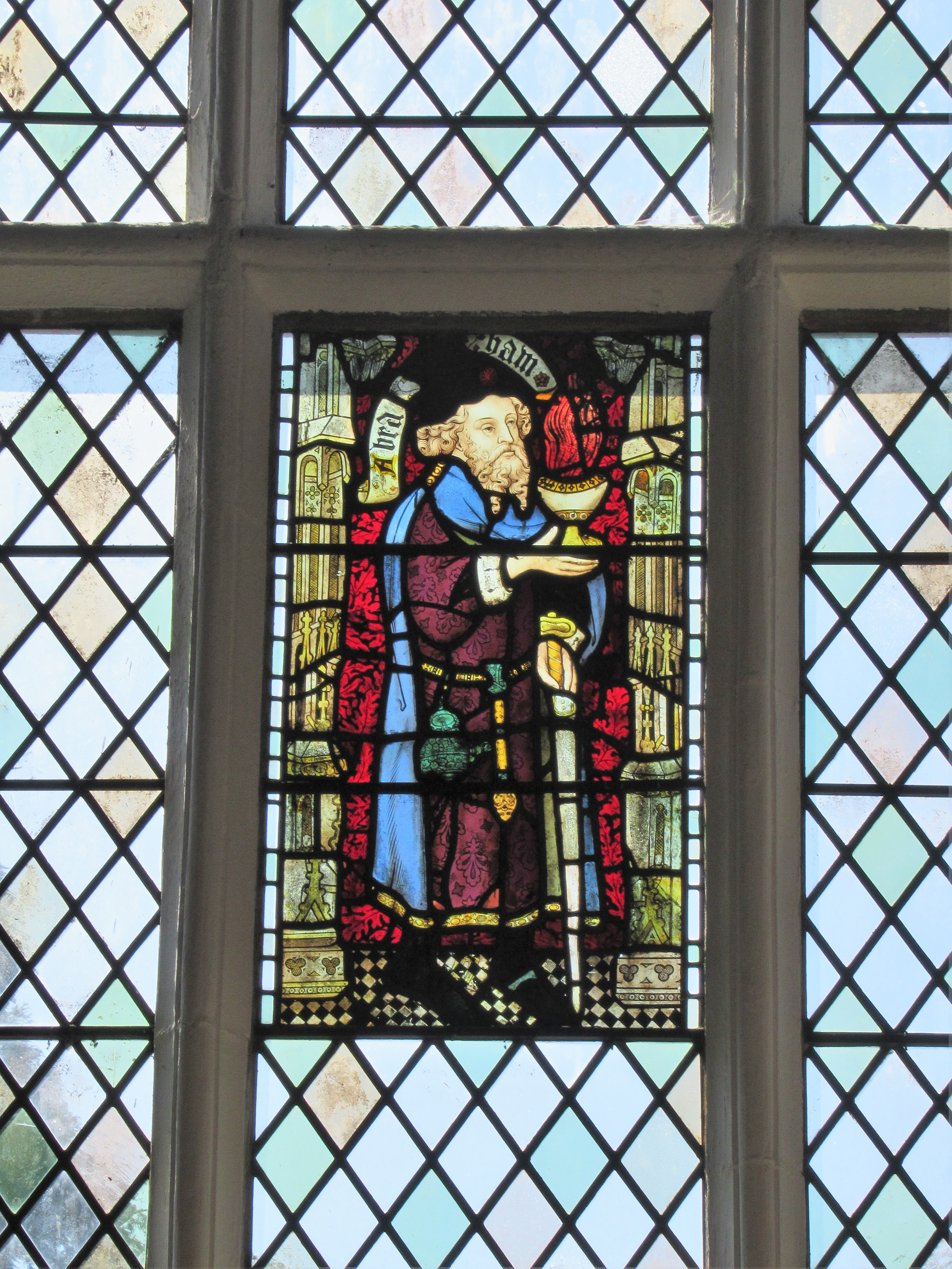
Medieval stained glass in Thaxted Church.

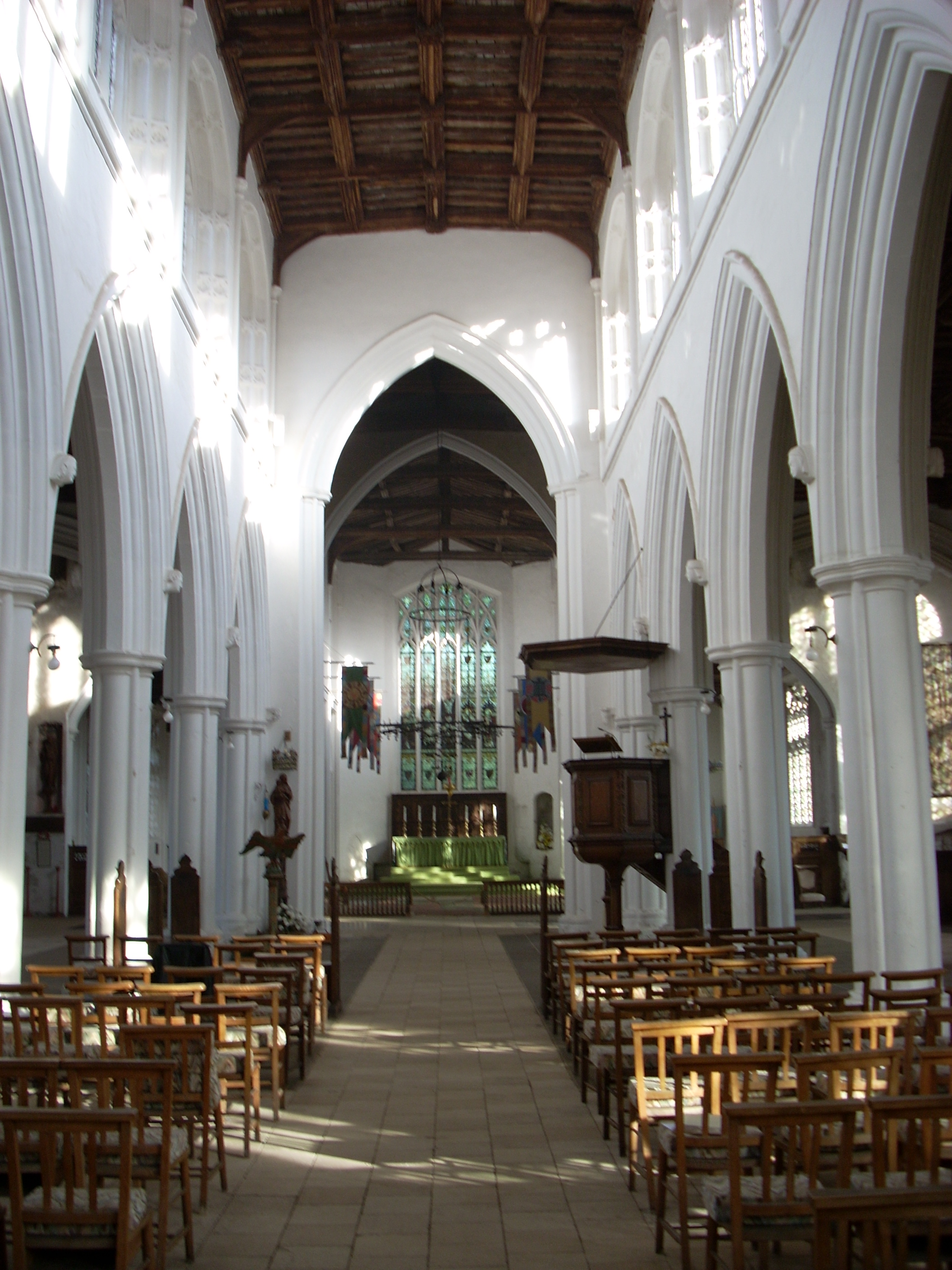
Interior of Thaxted Church, showing the pulpit.

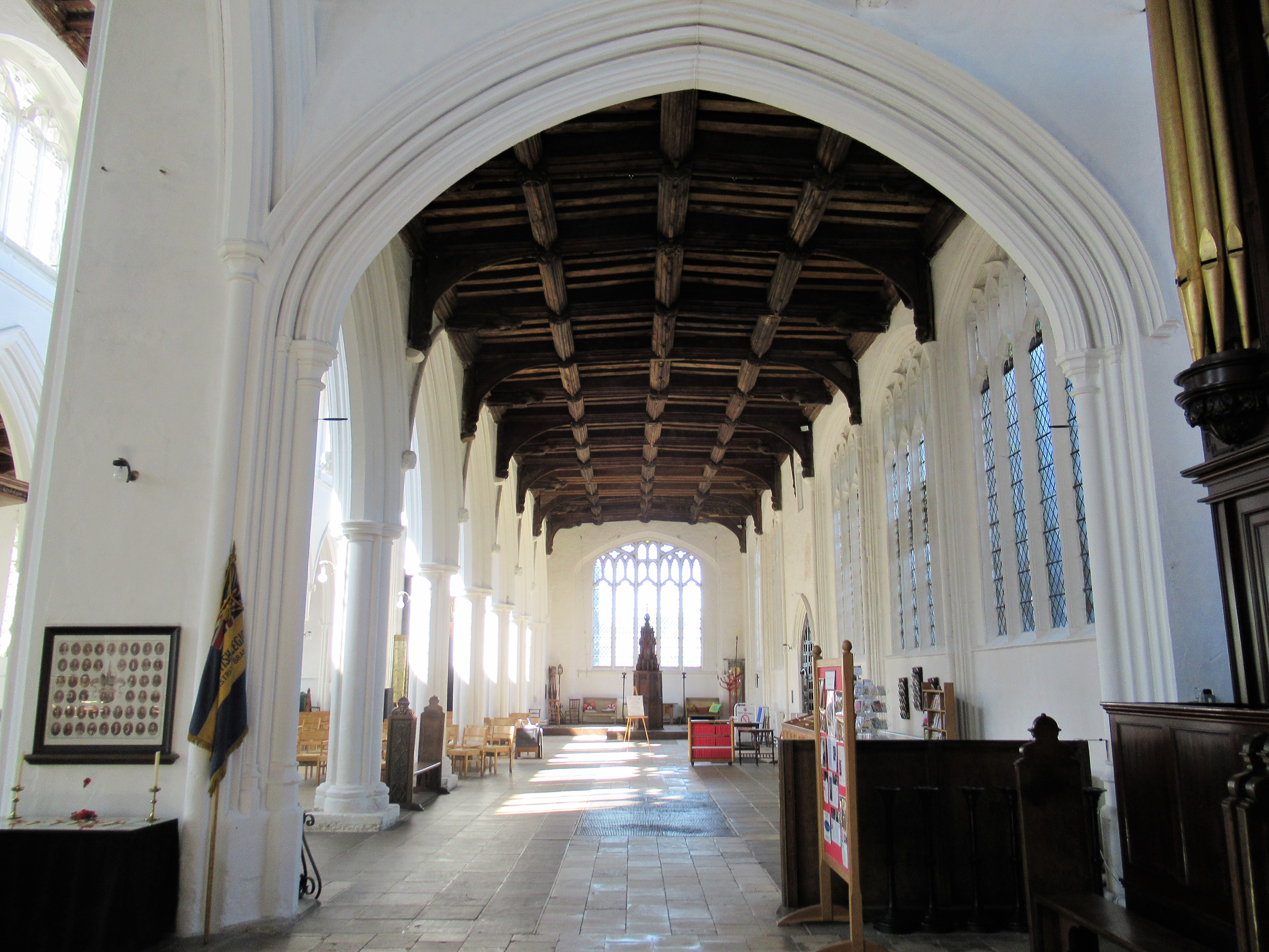
Thaxted Church, North Aisle with the covered font in the distance.

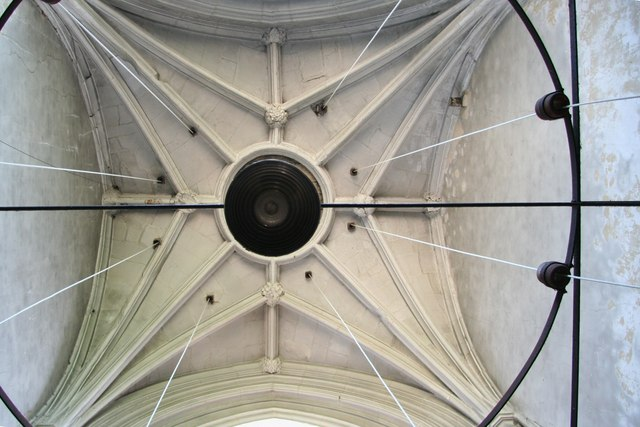
Thaxted Church, Tower vault

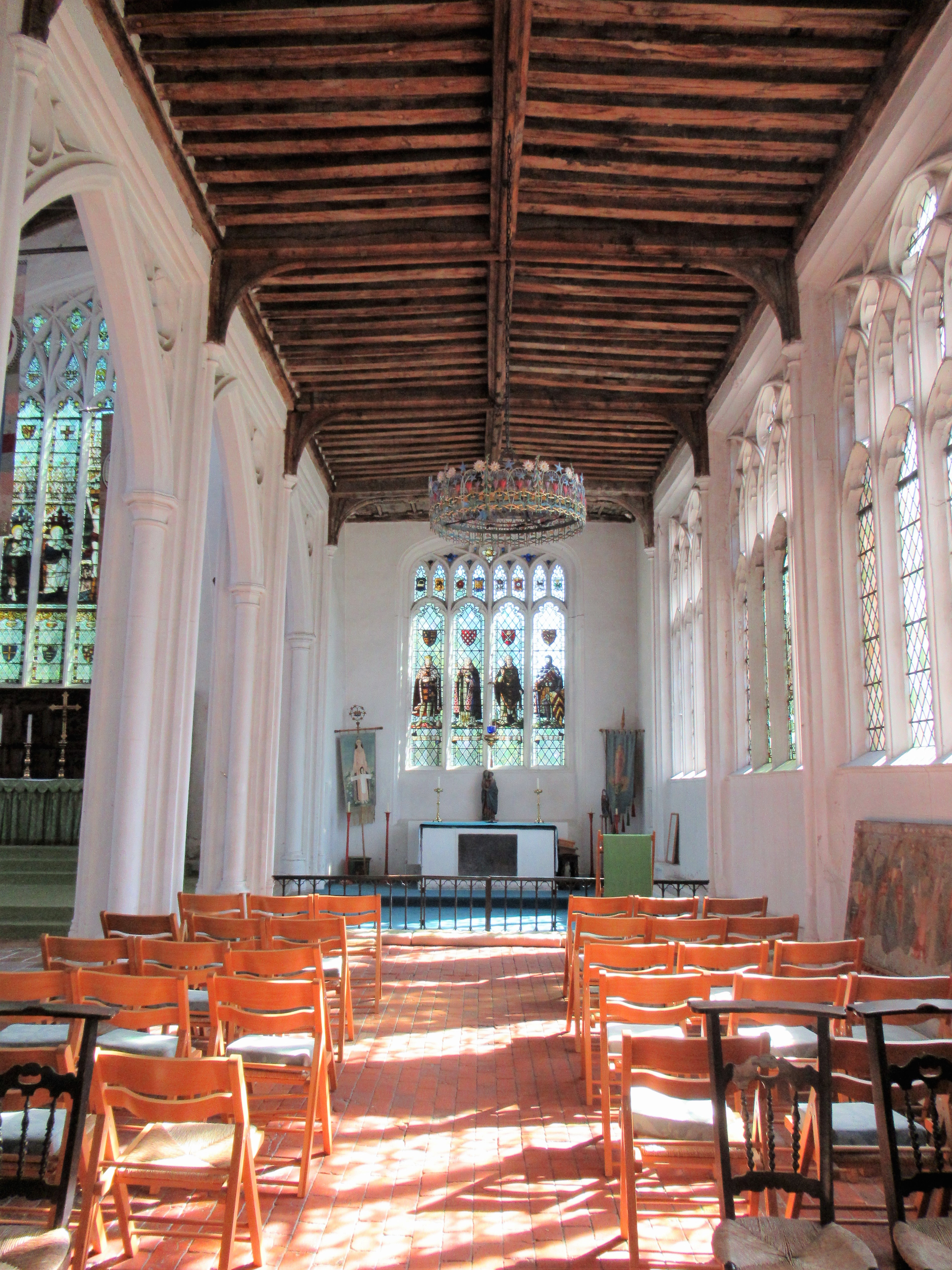
Thaxted Church, Lady Chapel

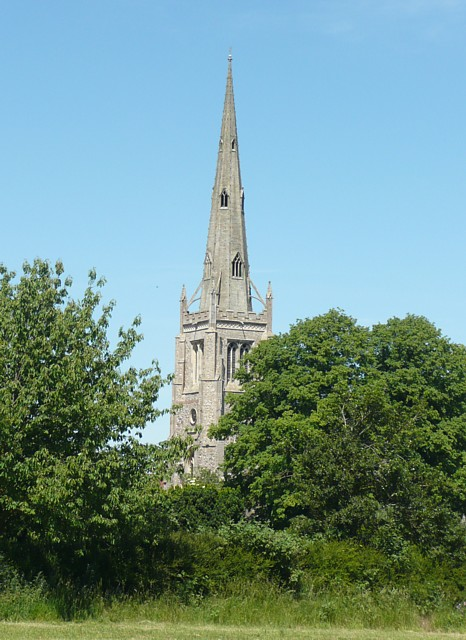
Spire, Thaxted Church

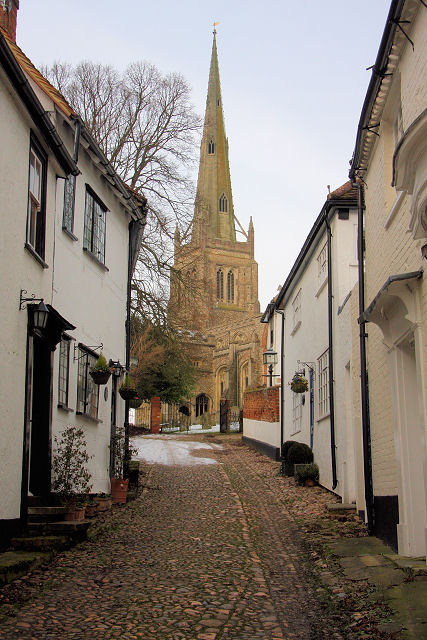
Thaxted Church, viewed from Stony Lane.

The tune, Thaxted, composed by Gustav Holst as a setting for the hymn, I Vow to Thee My Country, is associated with the church.

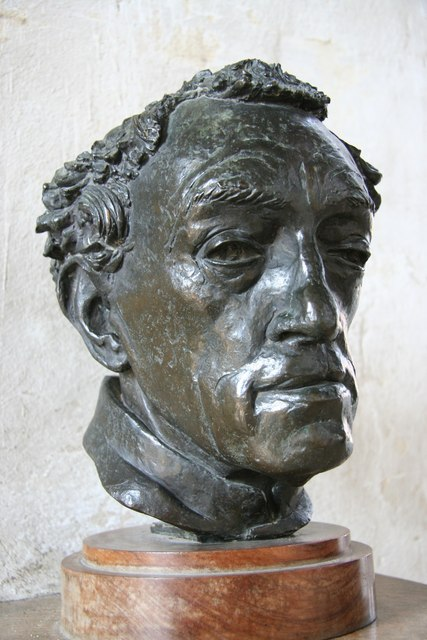
Conrad Noel, Vicar of Thaxted from 1910 to 1942

== List of vicars of Thaxted ==
The church was originally under the charge of the monks of Stoke by Clare. In 1227, the vicarage was created by Eustace, Bishop of London, after the town parishioners complained about the lack of a resident priest; his successor, Roger Niger, issued a more detailed ordination. Upon the Dissolution, the advowson to nominate the vicar passed to the Crown. In 1558, Philip and Mary granted the advowson to the Bishop of London, but this seems to have been later revoked since, in 1572, Elizabeth I granted it to William Howard, Lord Effingham, who alienated it by licence with the Lord of the Manor to William Petre and later to Sir William Maynard. The advowson remained in the Maynard family until it was sold by the Countess of Warwick in the 1920s. Appointments now rest with the Diocese of Chelmsford.

The following list was compiled from multiple sources:

List of vicars and rectors of Thaxted Parish Church from the founding of the vicarage
From	To	Name	End of tenure	Notes
Pre-Reformation (Roman Catholic)
Late 13th century	?	Thomas		Credited as the first vicar, he is commemorated in the Victorian stained glass window of the Lady Chapel (south chancel aisle).
1314	?	William		Still in place in 1324. This William sued the Monks of Tilty Abbey for non-payment of tithes to support the church, after they claimed exemption as Cistercians, and who was threatened with excommunication unless he gave up the case.
?	1332	William Pamphilus or Pamphilon		
1349		Walter de Salesbury		
1349	1351	John de Harewold	Exchange of benefice	Went to become vicar at Moreton, Essex.
1351	?	John Bele or Bell		Came from being vicar at Moreton, Essex.
1377	?	Thomas Ufford		Still alive in 1396.
c.1401	1431?	William		Lollard preacher, possibly a curate rather than vicar (fl.1401-9.) An indictment in the Public Record Office states: "Willelmus nuper capellanus parochialis de Thaxted est communis lollardus et tenet opiniones lollardas." A London chronicler says that "on Seynt Georgis day in lent [in the year 1431] ther whas a prest of Thaksted, that was vicory some tyme, brent in Smythfelde".
?	1407	Robert Wytton	Exchange of benefice	Went to become vicar at Earsham, Norfolk.
1407	1410	Thomas de Orton	Resigned	Came from being vicar at Earsham, Norfolk.
1410	1427	John Deye (of Brampton?)		
1427	?	John Everden		
?	1467	William Shaw		
1459	?	Thomas Groswyll?		
1467	1470	Nicholas Rewys or Rewes, Raynes	Resigned	
1470	?	Richard Edenham	Consecrated bishop	Subsequently appointed Bishop of Bangor
1470	1471	Hugo Edenham alias Wyrall or Wyvale	Resigned	Brother of previous incumbent.
1471	1476	David Steward	Resigned	
1476	1481	Thomas Halyday	Resigned	
1481	1489	Robert Wydow	Resigned	Born in Thaxted. He served both as schoolmaster and vicar in his home town. One of the first recipients of a Bachelor of Music degree from Oxford University and a renowned poet and musician in his day. A brass in Thaxted Church is a reputed likeness of him.
1489	after 1495	Richard Roston		
?	1519	Miles Hodgeson	Died	
1520	1523	Thomas Reynes	Resigned	
1523	1528	Edward Staples		Newcourt's Repertorium says he was appointed 1523 on death of Reynes. Venn says he was vicar in 1532. Later appointed Bishop of Meath.
1528	1534	Nicholas Wilson	Removed	Opposed Henry VIII on his divorce and was arrested for challenging royal supremacy.
Post-Reformation (Church of England)
1534	1539	John Skypp	Consecrated bishop	Later appointed Bishop of Hereford.
1539	1546	William Motte	Resigned	
1546	1561	John Puysaunt	Died	
1566	1566	William Bowen	Died	Presumably died before taking office.
1566	1583	Thomas Halliday	Died	Appointed "after death of last vicar".
1583	1612	Thomas Crosby	Died	Buried in the church.
Civil War period (disputed Laudian or Presbyterian)
1612	1645	Newman Leader	Removed	Removed by the Committee for Plundered Ministers.
1645	1646	Edmund Croxton	Removed	(Disputed Anglican) Removed by the Committee for Plundered Ministers; removal confirmed by the House of Lords. Venn shows him as in office until 1662.
1646	1647	Samuel Hall	Removed	(Disputed Anglican). Removed by the Committee for Plundered Ministers.
1648	1662	James Parkin	Removed	(Disputed Puritan) Confirmed by Committee for Plundered Ministers. Removed from office after the Restoration but remained in Thaxted as a non-conformist preacher.
Post-Restoration (Church of England)
1662	1670	John Curtis	Died	Buried in Thaxted.
1670	1724	Robert Bernard	Died	Buried in the church. Longest tenure as vicar of Thaxted.
1724	1735	Henry Oborne Sr.	Died	Buried in Thaxted.
1735	1752	James Allen	Died	Buried in Thaxted.
1752	1759	Henry Oborne Jr.	Died	Buried in Thaxted,
1759	1780	Richard White	Died	Buried in the church.
1780	1782	Claudius Martyn	Died	
1782	1806	Henry Maynard	Died	Father of 5th Baronet Maynard. The Maynard family held the advowson of the benefice.
1806	1853	Thomas Jee	Died	Buried in the church.
1853	1854	Edward Hanson	Died	
1854	1859	Court D'Ewes Granville	Resigned	
1859	1893	George Edward Symonds	Died	Buried at Stoke-by-Nayland where his son was vicar.
1893	1910	Leonard Sedgwick Westall	Resigned	
1910	1942	Conrad Le Dispenser Roden Noel	Died	"The Red Vicar of Thaxted". Buried in the churchyard.
1942	1973	John Cyril "Jack" Putterill	Resigned	Son-in-law of Conrad Noel.
1973	1984	Peter Charles Edward Elers	Resigned	
1984	1989	Timothy John Fawcett		
1989	2000	Richard Nigel Rowe	Resigned	Served as Thaxted’s Catholic parish priest between 2014 - 2022.
2000	2013	Raymond Montgomery Taylor	Retired	
2014	2015	Paul David Christopher Brown		
2016	2021	Philip Geoffrey Tarris	Retired	Rector. Since 2017, a Team Ministry in a unified benefice of Thaxted with Hempstead, Radwinter and the Sampfords.
2023	2024	Gerwyn Capon	Resigned to become Archdeacon of Montgomery	Former Dean of Llandaff
2025		David Owain Sheppard		
