= John Gardiner =

John Gardiner may refer to:

- John Gardiner, Baron Gardiner of Kimble (born 1956), British peer
- John Sylvester John Gardiner (1765–1830), Rector of Trinity Church, Boston, Massachusetts
- John Gardiner (Australia) (1798–1878), banker and grazier
- John Gardiner (basketball) (1943–2014), Australian Olympic basketball player
- John Gardiner (businessman) (1936–2023), British businessman
- John Gardiner (footballer, born 1911) (1911–1965), Scottish footballer, played for Great Britain in 1936 Olympics
- John Gardiner (footballer, born 1958), Scottish footballer
- John Gardiner (hurler) (born 1983), hurler with Cork GAA
- Sir John Eliot Gardiner (born 1943), British conductor
- John Reynolds Gardiner (1944–2006), American children's author
- John Gardiner (Montreal politician), former politician in Montreal, Quebec, Canada
- John Stanley Gardiner (1872–1946), British zoologist
- John Gardiner (died 1586) (1525–1586), MP for Penryn and Dorchester
- John Gardiner (cricketer) (1810–?), English cricketer
- John Rolfe Gardiner (born 1936), American author
- John Gardiner (painter), see Charles Tupper
- Harry Gardiner (politician) (John Henry Gardiner, 1907–1974), Australian politician

== See also ==
- John Gardner (disambiguation)
- John Gardener (disambiguation)
