= This Have I Done for My True Love =

Motet by Gustav Holst

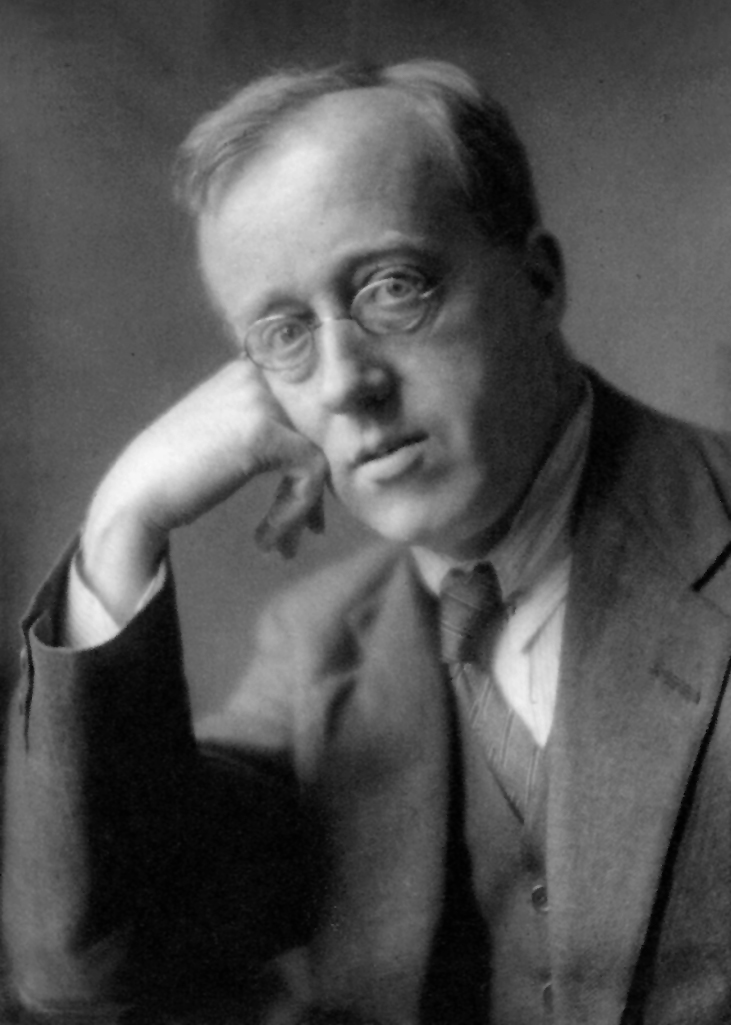
Gustav Holst, circa 1921

"This Have I Done for My True Love", or "Tomorrow Shall Be My Dancing Day", Op. 34, no. 1 [H128], is a motet or part song composed in 1916 by Gustav Holst. The words are taken from an ancient carol, and the music is so strongly influenced by English folk music that it has sometimes been mistaken for a traditional folk song itself. It has often been described as a small masterpiece.

== Composition ==
In 1916 Holst was living in a country cottage two miles south of Thaxted in Essex. There he became aware of the ancient Cornish carol "Tomorrow Shall Be My Dancing Day" thanks to the town's vicar, Conrad Noel, who, having come across it in an 1833 collection edited by William Sandys, copied out the words and pinned them up in church. Thinking the carol's traditional tune rather uninspiring, Holst produced his own setting for mixed choir, which, though it betrays the contrapuntal and harmonic influence of the English madrigalists, uses a modal melody so redolent of folksong that it was frequently mistaken for one. He dedicated the work to Noel. The words of the carol present the idea of the redemption of mankind through "the General Dance"; an image which so intrigued Holst that he went on to look for other works connecting dance with worship, and this search soon led to his composing the Hymn of Jesus.

== First performances ==
The work was first performed at Thaxted parish church on 19 May 1918, conducted by Holst. The first London performance took place at the Aeolian Hall on 23 December 1919, the choir being the Oriana Madrigal Society conducted by Charles Kennedy Scott.

== Reception ==
Holst himself was proud of the work, calling it his "best thing". It was performed at Chichester Cathedral in 1934 when his ashes were buried there. By 1937 it was being described as his best-known work; it remains a choral favourite and has often been called a small masterpiece. It is commemorated by a church bell inscribed "I ring for the general dance" at Thaxted, though even there objections were initially heard to its being sung inside the church, and Ralph Vaughan Williams had to defend its suitability for church performance as late as 1951.

== Recordings ==
- The Sixteen, cond. Harry Christophers (2021). Carol of the Bells. Coro. COR16188.
- Christ Church Cathedral Choir, dir. Stephen Darlington (1991). Make We Joy: Christmas Music by Holst and Walton. Nimbus. NI 5098.
- Choir of Magdalen College, Oxford, dir. John Harper (1984). The English Carol. Alpha. ACA 527.
- Choir of St John's College, Cambridge, cond. David Hill (2006). Christmas at St John's. Hyperion. CDA67576.
- Purcell Singers, cond. Imogen Holst. Holst: Vocal and Instrumental Music. Argo. ZRG 5497.
- Godwine Choir, cond. Edward Hughes and/or Alex Davan Wetton (2020). Alpha & Omega: Gustav Holst Christmas Music. EM. EMR CD062.
- BBC Singers, cond. Simon Joly (1994). BBC Singers – A 70th Anniversary Celebration. BBC Music Magazine. BBC MM125.
- Holst Singers, cond. Stephen Layton (1994). This Have I Done for My True Love. Hyperion. CDA 66705.
- St. John's College Choir, Cambridge, cond. Christopher Robinson (2010). Advent Carols from St John's. Nimbus. NI 5414.
- Choir of Clare College, Cambridge, cond. Graham Ross (2020). A Ceremony of Carols. Harmonia Mundi. HMM 905329.
- Rachel Wheatley, The Finzi Singers, cond. Paul Spicer (1996). Holst Vaughan Williams Choral Music. Chandos. CHAN 9425.
- Choir of Keble College, Oxford, cond. Philip Stopford. Lux Mundi. Priory. PRCD657.
- York Chapter House Choir, cond. Jane Sturmheit (1997). A Voice from Heaven: A Cappella Choral Music by British Composers. Guild. GMCD 7140.
- BBC Northern Singers, cond. Stephen Wilkinson. Gustav Holst: Hymn of Jesus, Egdon Heath, Perfect Fool, Folksong Arrangements. Alto. ALC1359.
- BBC Chorus, cond. Leslie Woodgate (2016). Heirs and Rebels. Albion. ALBCD027.
