= Preedy =

Preedy is a surname. Notable people with the surname include:

- Bob Preedy (born 20th century), British broadcaster and author
- Charlie Preedy (1900–1978), English footballer
- Cyril Preedy (1920–1965), English pianist
- Frederick Preedy (1820–1898), English architect and glass painter
- Malcolm Preedy (born 1960), English rugby union player
- Tiverton Preedy (1863–1928), English clergyman
