= The Hymn of Jesus =

Choral composition by Gustav Holst

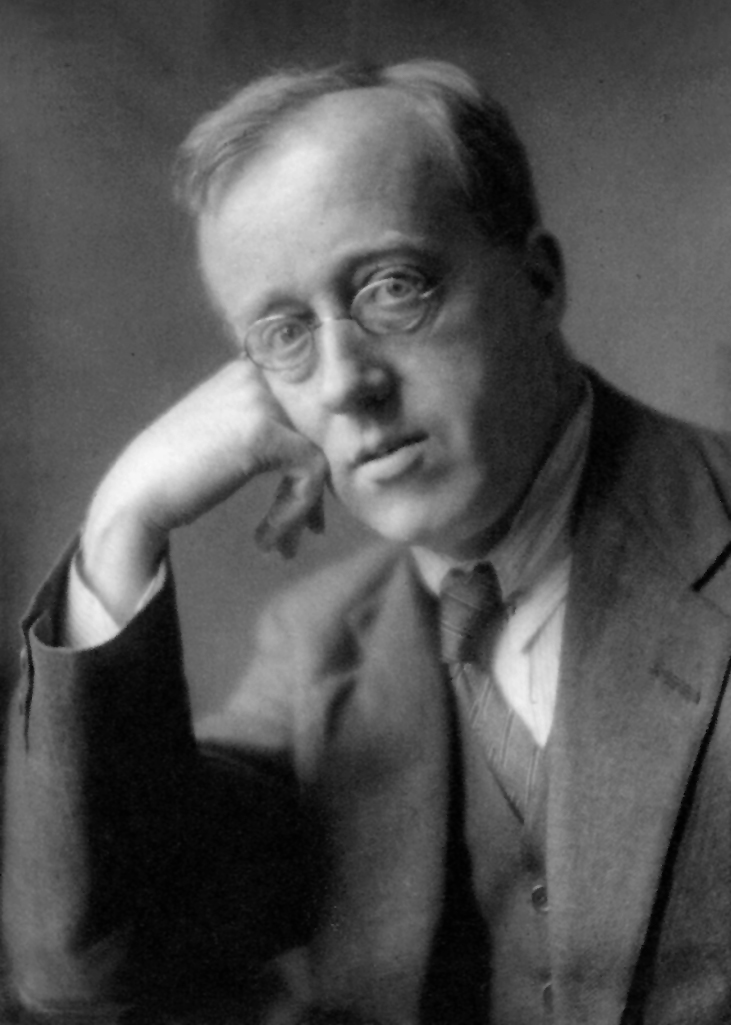
Gustav Holst, circa 1921

The Hymn of Jesus, H. 140, Op. 37, is a sacred work by Gustav Holst scored for two choruses, semi-chorus, and full orchestra. It was written in 1917–1919 and first performed in 1920. One of his most popular and highly acclaimed compositions, it is divided into two sections. The Prelude presents the plainsong Pange lingua and Vexilla regis (both to texts by Venantius Fortunatus) first instrumentally and then chorally; the second section, the Hymn, is a setting of his own translation of the Hymn of Jesus from the apocryphal Acts of John.

== Scoring ==
The Hymn of Jesus is scored for two mixed choirs and one women's semi-chorus, with three flutes (one doubling piccolo), two oboes, cor anglais, two clarinets, two bassoons, four horns, two trumpets, three trombones, percussion (one player – snare drum, bass drum, tambourine, cymbals), piano, celeste, organ, and strings. Holst specified that "The two choruses should be of fairly equal strength, and, if possible, should be well separated. The semi-chorus should be placed above them and well apart. If too far from the orchestra, it can be supported by a soft harmonium." An alternative version exists scored for two mixed choirs and one women's semi-chorus, with piano and strings.

== Composition ==
The Hymn of Jesus has roots far back in Holst's professional life. He studied the plainsong hymns used in the prelude while assisting his friend Ralph Vaughan Williams in the editing of The English Hymnal (1906). Various thematic elements in the Hymn first appeared in his The Mystic Trumpeter (1904), the second set of Choral Hymns from the Rig Veda (1909), the Hymn to Dionysus (1913), and The Planets (1914–1916). He had long believed that the origins of dance can be traced back to primitive religious ritual, and this association was in his mind in his setting of the traditional carol "Tomorrow Shall Be My Dancing Day" in 1916, a work which presents Christ's ministry as a dance. Searching for similar texts, he chose a passage from the apocryphal Acts of John, edited by the Theosophist G. R. S. Mead, which ostensibly gives us the words sung after the Last Supper by Christ and his disciples as they danced in a circle. "Ye who dance not, know not what we are knowing", they sing. Though he had little knowledge of Ancient Greek, Holst produced his own translation of the hymn during the early months of 1917, helped by Mead, Jane Joseph, and Clifford Bax. He also visited a monastery to research the proper phrasing of Pange lingua and Vexilla regis, the two plainsong hymns he was to use as a prelude for the work. Finally, in the summer of 1917, he began the composition of the work, although this was interrupted by war work in Salonika and not completed until 1919.

== Publication and early performances ==
In 1919 the Hymn was chosen for publication by Stainer & Bell, on behalf of the Carnegie United Kingdom Trust, as part of the Carnegie Collection of British Music. This was a distinction which showed that it had been recognized as one of that year's most valuable contributions to the art of music by a British composer. The Carnegie edition was reprinted several times, and by 1923 had sold 8500 copies.

On 10 March 1920 the work was performed by the students of the Royal College of Music under the baton of the composer. The first public performance happened a fortnight later on 25 March at the Queen's Hall, with the Royal Philharmonic Orchestra and Philharmonic Choir, again conducted by Holst. Though on this occasion the choirs did not always completely master the unusual rhythms the audience was enthusiastic, calling loudly but unsuccessfully for a second performance. Vaughan Williams, the Hymn's dedicatee, said that he "wanted to get up and embrace everyone and then get drunk". The work was given many performances in the next few years. It was included in the Three Choirs Festival in 1921 and again in 1927, and was performed at the Albert Hall by the Royal Choral Society under Hugh Allen in 1922. It received its American premiere in 1923 at the Ann Arbor May Festival, and its first broadcast performance, relayed from Southwark Cathedral by the BBC, in 1924.

== Reception ==
The Hymn of Jesus was so great a success as to bewilder its composer; he quoted the Biblical verse, "Woe to you when all men speak well of you!". One of the performers at the original Royal College of Music performance later remembered that "To many the work was like a trumpet call in the renaissance of English creative music. To some of us it seemed something even more, a vindication of the right of the English composer to be considered as a potential contributor to the general musical culture of the world at large." The great critic Donald Tovey told Holst that "It completely bowls me over. If anybody doesn't like it, he doesn't like life". The Observer described it as "one of the most brilliant and one of the most sincere pieces of choral and orchestral expression heard for some years." The Times wrote that it was "undoubtedly the most strikingly original choral work which has been produced in this country for many years...Though Mr Holst writes in the boldest harmonic style, the two choirs often singing the most conflicting chords simultaneously, the texture never sounds crude, because the expressive purpose is always kept in view as a bigger thing than incidental technical effect." The Spectator considered it "a great mystical achievement; it must take its place in the front rank of our choral music", and noted that Holst's music was "modern with a very good pedigree", citing Henry Purcell as one of his musical forebears, evident in Holst's use of ground bass. The Royal College of Music performer quoted above thought that the Hymn "for all its novelty of expression seemed firmly rooted in the great tradition of English choral writing". Holst himself named the madrigals of Thomas Weelkes as an influence, though the Holst scholar Michael Short found little in the Hymn to support this claim. Certainly, the work marked a complete break with the 19th-century tradition of English oratorio, but in later years, after such works as Stravinsky's Symphony of Psalms and Bernstein's Chichester Psalms, it began to seem less innovative. One critic wrote that "Its spell...wore off considerably by the end of the century, perhaps because Holst interrupts the fun to reverently remind us that the mystical Jesus is speaking". Nevertheless, it remains for some judges one of the greatest choral compositions of its time, an expression of "overwhelming religious exaltation", in which, according to Michael Tippett, "Holst transcended his time, his location, his roots, showing himself a true visionary."
