= Jack Gardner =

Jack Gardner may refer to:

- Jack Gardner (basketball) (1910–2000), college basketball coach
- Jack Gardner (boxer) (1926–1978), British heavyweight boxer
- Jack Gardner (general) (born 1954), general in the United States Army
- Jack Gardner (musician) (1903–1957), American jazz musician
- John Lowell Gardner (1837–1898), American art collector and philanthropist
- Jack Gardner (actor) (1902–1977), American film actor in The Secret Code

== See also ==
- John Gardner (disambiguation)
