= John Gardner (composer) =

English composer

John Linton Gardner, CBE (2 March 1917 – 12 December 2011) was an English composer of classical music.

== Early life ==
John Gardner was born in Manchester, England and grew up in Ilfracombe, North Devon. His father Alfred Linton Gardner (born 1882, Ilfracombe died 10 April 1918, France) was a local physician and amateur composer who was killed in action in the First World War. His grandfather was John Twiname Gardner, also a general practitioner and composer. His mother, Emily Muriel Pullein-Thompson, was the sister of Captain Harold J "Cappy" Pullein-Thompson, who was the father of Josephine, Diana and Christine Pullein-Thompson and their brother, the playwright Denis Cannan.

Gardner was educated at Eagle House School, Sandhurst, Wellington College and Exeter College, Oxford, where he was the Hubert Parry organ scholar. An important figure in his early life was Hubert J. Foss of Oxford University Press, who published the Intermezzo for Organ in 1936 and introduced him to the composer Arthur Benjamin, to whom Gardner dedicated his Rhapsody for Oboe and String Quartet (1935). This work had its first performance at the Wigmore Hall in February 1936. The String Quartet No. 1 (1938) was broadcast from Paris by the Blech Quartet in 1939, and the anthem The Holy Son of God most High (1938) was also published by OUP. At Oxford Gardner was friendly with Theodor Adorno with whom he played piano duets. An article about Gardner's time at Oxford is published in the British Music Society journal.

== Career ==
After leaving Oxford in 1939, Gardner completed two terms as music master at Repton School, where one of his pupils was the composer John Veale, then a sixth former. In 1940 he enlisted and working first as a Bandmaster (Fighter Command) and then as a Navigator with Transport Command. It was during the War that ideas for the Symphony No.1 began to form.

My first symphony assembled itself in my mind in stages during the last year or two of the War. The opening even goes back further to a short piano piece I wrote in 1939 or 1940. At that time I'd no idea that it could be the beginning of a symphony, though I was aware that it hardly constituted a complete piano piece.

Other elements in the score started variously as a mid-war setting of passages from Blake's Book of Thel, a theme I conceived for a set of variations and, in the case of the main theme of the finale, a transformation of the opening of the finale. of my first string quartet which had in fact gained two or three performances in Paris and England by the Blech Quartet in 1939 but with which I was deeply unsatisfied and which I eventually withdrew.

I do not believe it is exceptional for a big work to derive from several sources – there are many examples of such a process in the origin of many of Brahms' best known pieces : the first piano concerto, for example, the German Requiem and the Violin Concerto. In my case it was, of course, because I was serving in the R.A.F. around the World and could only conceive music in the scrappiest manner on odd pieces of paper in the most unsympathetic ambiances. Demobilisation, therefore, came as a blessed chance to write at length, which is what I did during the bitter Winter of 1946–7 on those evenings when I did not have to be in attendance at the Royal Opera House, Covent Garden, where I earned my living as a repetiteur. In June 1947 I reached the end of the fair full score, put it aside and began to write an opera that never got performed.

Gardner regarded the end of the War as a new start, set aside his juvenile works (of which nearly 100 have survived in manuscript) and began again from Opus 1. He took a job as a repetiteur at the Royal Opera House, Covent Garden. John Barbirolli discovered the First Symphony (Op. 2) when Gardner was given the opportunity of playing through his Nativity Opera. According to Gardner this work is "unperformable", which fact was quickly grasped by Barbirolli; however, when Barbirolli asked to see other works, Gardner showed him the Symphony. The first movement needed some re-working because Barbirolli was not convinced it made sense in its original form. The work was scheduled for the 1951 Cheltenham Festival where it caused a minor sensation.

Many major commissions followed and Gardner was suddenly able to call himself "a composer". He resigned the job at the Opera House and there followed a remarkable period of creativity. Cantiones Sacrae, Op. 11, Variations on a Waltz of Carl Nielsen, Op. 13 and the ballet Reflection, Op. 14, were all written in 1951 and 1952 and first performed during 1952. He re-wrote A Scots Overture, previously a military band piece, for the 1954 season of Promenade Concerts in 1954. In May 1957 Sadler's Wells put on the opera The Moon and Sixpence, which they had commissioned, and two other major works were premiered that year, the Piano Concerto No. 1 (Cyril Preedy and Barbirolli at the Cheltenham Festival) and the Seven Songs, Op. 36 in Birmingham, a work which Gardner wrote as "light relief" while working on the other major works.

In 1956 he was invited by Thomas Armstrong to join the staff of the Royal Academy of Music, where he would teach for the best part of thirty years. A few years later he took a part-time job as Director of Music at St Paul's Girls' School, following Gustav Holst and Herbert Howells, and was for a time Director of Music at Morley College. These teaching posts led to the composition of some of his most enduring works, and together with the many holiday courses he worked on as a conductor (Canford, Dartington, ESSYM, Bernard Robinson's Music Camp, etc.) ensured that he was able to bring practical experience and knowledge to bear on his compositions.

Gardner composed prolifically throughout his life, and his works are listed on his website (see link below). Among the major works are two more symphonies, two more operas – The Visitors (1972) and Tobermory (1976), concertos for Trumpet, Flute, Oboe and Recorder and Bassoon, many cantatas, including The Ballad of the White Horse, Op. 40 (1959), Five Hymns in Popular Style, Op. 54 (1962), A Burns Sequence, Op. 213 (1993), as well as much choral, chamber, organ, brass and orchestral music. He is particularly noted for his works for choirs, which have drawn many plaudits.

Gardner's best known work is the Christmas carol Tomorrow Shall Be My Dancing Day, which was written for St Paul's, as was another popular carol setting, The Holly and the Ivy.

His final work was a Bassoon Concerto, Op. 249, written in 2004 for Graham Salvage, the principal bassoonist of the Hallé Orchestra, which was premiered at the Budleigh Salterton Festival in July 2007, by Graham Salvage with the Festival Orchestra conducted by Nicholas Marshall.

== Honours ==
Gardner was made an Honorary Member of the Royal Academy of Music (Hon. RAM) in 1959; a Commander of the Order of the British Empire (CBE) in 1976; and an Honorary Member of the Royal Philharmonic Society in 1997, the year of his eightieth birthday.

== Personal life ==
Gardner married Jane Abercrombie, the daughter of Nigel Abercrombie (Secretary General of the Arts Council 1963–1968) and the soprano Elisabeth Abercrombie, in 1955. They had three children. After the War he lived in South London – in Morden, New Malden and Ewell. He died in Liss Forest, England.

== Recordings ==
Gardner's music, apart from "Tomorrow shall be my dancing day", has been largely unrepresented on commercial records, but in recent years a number of new recordings have been issued, including the 3rd Symphony, Oboe Concerto, Flute Concerto, Petite Suite for Recorder and Strings (with the Royal Ballet Sinfonia conducted by Gavin Sutherland) and Seven Songs. In September 2007, Naxos issued his Symphony No. 1, Piano Concerto and the overture Midsummer Ale. David Lloyd-Jones conducted the Royal Scottish National Orchestra with Peter Donohoe as the solo pianist. Toccata issued Music for Brass and Organ in 2017, and the two volume Complete Organ Music (performed by Tom Winpenny) in 2024 and 2025.
