= Robert Wydow =

English poet, church musician and religious figure (c. 1446–1505)

Robert Wydow (c. 1446 – 1505) was an English poet, church musician, and religious figure.

Born in Thaxted, Essex, he was initially educated by his stepfather, who was the local schoolmaster. By 1455 or 1456, he was studying music and Latin in the chapel of King's College, Cambridge, where he was a chorister. He was admitted to Eton College as a scholar, where he studied from about 1460 to 1464, when he returned to King's College, graduating in either 1467 or 1468. He followed in his stepfather's footsteps post-graduation, becoming schoolmaster for Thaxted. He also tutored the sons of nobility.

He came to the notice of Edward IV, who named him chaplain of the Black Prince's Chantry at Canterbury Cathedral in 1474, a position he held for four years. In either 1478 or 1479, he was awarded a Bachelor of Music degree from Oxford University; he is the earliest known recipient of this degree. During this period, degrees were conferred on recipients who had already distinguished themselves professionally; there was no residential study. Upon conclusion of Wydow's service at the Black Prince's Chantry, he was awarded benefices at Monks Eleigh, Suffolk (1479–81), Thaxted (1481–9), St Benet Paul's Wharf, London (1489–93), and Chalfont St Giles, Buckinghamshire (1493–8). In 1497, he was appointed a canon of Wells Cathedral, where he would remain for the rest of his life. He was promoted to the office of subdean on 25 May 1500. He was buried at the south aisle of the cathedral on 4 October 1505.

Wydow's contemporaries held him in high esteem as a poet and musician. Raphael Holinshed called him "an excellent poet", and John Leland described him as "easily the finest" of Latin authors of the time. However, only a few lines of his poetry survive.
