= John Gardener (diplomat) =

British diplomat

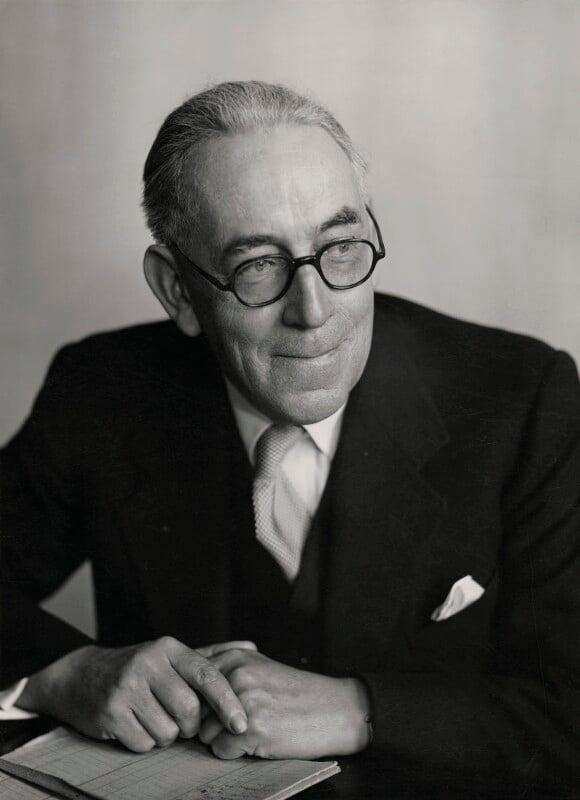
Gardener c. 1950

Sir Alfred John Gardener, KCMG CBE (6 February 1897 - 16 March 1985) was a British diplomat. He was Ambassador to Afghanistan from 1949 to 1951, and Ambassador to Syria from 1953 to 1957.
