= John Twiname Gardner =

John Twiname Gardner (2 August 1854, in South Molton – 15 February 1914, in Kensington) was a general practitioner and composer of much published parlour and light music. From 1888 to 1903 he worked as a family doctor in Ilfracombe, North Devon, where he conducted the local choral society and was generally a mainstay of musical life in the town. He was the grandfather of the well-known composer John Gardner.

J.T. Gardner's White Star Polka March was held in the music libraries of the ships of the White Star Line, including Titanic.

== List of published compositions ==
=== Instrumental works ===
Bella Vista (Valse)
Britannia - a Patriotic Selection - Francis, Day & Hunter Ltd. (1901)
Carissima (Waltz) - Francis Day and Hunter (1897)
Celestine (Valse) - Francis Brothers and Day
Cherie (Valse) - Francis Brothers and Day
Clair de Lune (Valse) -Francis Brothers and Day
Danse des Lutins - Francis Brothers and Day
Ma Vie (Valse) -Frances Day and Hunter
Marjorie (Gavotte) - Francis Brothers and Day
Mavourneen (Waltz)- Francis Day and Hunter (1899)
Minuet in A -Willcocks and Co
The Pullman Express (Descriptive galop) - Francis Day and Hunter (1904)
Querida (Valse) - Francis Day and Hunter (1892)
Le Reve d'Amour - Francis Brothers and Day
White Star (Polka March) - Francis Day and Hunter

=== Vocal works ===
Against the Stream
The Better Land - Willcocks & Co. The Children's Prayer
Caught at Last - Willcocks & Co.
Come May with all thy flowers - Marriott & Williams
Come back my love to me - Marriott & Williams
Dearest to me - Willcocks & Co.
The Drummer Boy - W.W. Warne
God Bless the Royal Pair - Twiss & Sons, Ilfracombe (1893)
God Save the King - Novello & Co.
Jesu, Lover of my Soul - Willcocks & Co.
The Merry Muleteer - Marriott & Williams (1892)
Old Friends - Marriott & Williams
Peaceful be thy sleeping - Willcocks & Co.
The Roseate Hues - Willcocks & Co.
The song we ne'er may sing -B. Mocatta & Co.
We Fear no Foreign Foe - Marriott & Williams
Zingarella - J.B. Cramer & Co.
