= John Gardner (Texas Ranger) =

John Gardner (c. 1845–1926) was a Texas Ranger, cowboy, fighter of Native Americans, and trail boss who was the subject of a folklore song titled, "John Gardner's Trail Herd". It was often alleged that Gardner was a member of the Sam Bass Gang. He was the father of Joe Gardner, a noted World Roping Champion.

== Biography ==
John E. Gardner was born in 1845 at Natchitoches Parish, Louisiana. His father removed the family to Texas. The Gardner family were known as cowboys and Indian fighters.

The Gardner brothers all worked as cowboys on the Texas frontier. John and his brothers, Alex and Peter Gardner were hired as cowboys in Southwest Texas working ranches and driving cattle to the Kansas cowtowns. Gardner stated in a short autobiography that he was involved in many fights with Mexicans and Indians, but held back thinking it would "sound fishy these days".

Gardner was a friend of the famous outlaw Sam Bass and it claimed that Bass recalled his friend Gardner while on his deathbed. Gardner was said to have been a gunman with the Sam Bass Gang during the 1870s robbing stagecoaches in the Dakota Territory. Gardner was one of the first men to drive cattle into the Black Hills along with the Collins brothers and Sam Bass. It was said that Gardner was involved in the Big Springs train robbery with the gang.

Gardner later settled on a ranch in Maverick County, Texas. He married and fathered children. The Texas folk song, "John Gardner's Trail Herd", described Gardner as a man who "would meet you on the square" and that he was the "biggest cow - thief" that ever roamed.

Gardner's reputation as an outlaw is controversial, but he had been a Texas Ranger for three years. A neighbor described him as "big" and "hairy", and man who was kind and never allowed anyone to run over him. John Gardner died in 1926 from natural causes in El Paso, Texas.
