= John Gardner (footballer) =

Australian rules footballer

Personal information
- Full name: John Gardner
- Born: 3 November 1946 (age 80)
- Original team: Geelong College
- Height: 189 cm (6 ft 2 in)
- Weight: 89 kg (196 lb)
- Position: Ruck

Playing career^{1}
Years	Club	Games (Goals)
1966–68	Hawthorn	42 (7)
- ^{1} Playing statistics correct to the end of 1968.

John Gardner (born 3 November 1946) is a former Australian rules footballer who played with Hawthorn in the Victorian Football League (VFL).
