= Cyril Preedy =

- Born: 1920; London, England
- Died: 11 July 1965, (aged 45); Worthing, Sussex, England
- Occupation: Pianist

Cyril Preedy (1920 – 11 July 1965) was an English pianist who was described as "the most outstanding young pianists to emerge in the post war era".

Preedy was born in London in 1920 and at age six he started to learn the piano with Marie Schwartz in Paris. His first public appearance was at the Salle Pleyel when he was aged eight, he became a Junior Exhibitioner at the Royal College of Music in the same year. In 1936 he gained a London County Council scholarship to study at the Royal College of Music under Herbert Fryer, in 1939 he was awarded the Hopkinson Gold Medal and the Chappell Gold Medal the following year.

Preedy served with the Royal Air Force during the Second World War, at the end of the war he started regular appearances with concert societies and symphony orchestras around the country, Preedy also performed for radio broadcasts.

In 1955, he started an association with the Rambert Ballett Company when they had a need for a solo pianist, he later became a permanent member of the company. Preedy died suddenly aged 45 on 11 July 1965 at Worthing hospital.
