= Tomorrow Shall Be My Dancing Day =

English Christmas carol

"Tomorrow Shall Be My Dancing-day" is an English carol usually attributed as "traditional"; its first written appearance is in William B. Sandys' Christmas Carols Ancient and Modern of 1833. However, it is almost certainly of a much earlier date; Studwell (2006) places it in the 16th century. Cahill (2006) based on the phrase "to see the legend of my play" speculates that the text may be based on an earlier version associated with a mystery play of the late medieval period. (Note: Cahill 2006 presents this song as an English carol in which Christ speaks of his incarnation, his "dancing day". Cahill claims "We find it printed on many extant broadsides, one-page handouts from the early age of printing", adding that there is "every reason to believe that the text originated in the later Middle Ages, perhaps in the fourteenth century.")

Numerous composers have made original settings of it or arranged the traditional tune, including Gustav Holst, John Gardner (op. 75.2, 1965), Igor Stravinsky, David Willcocks, John Rutter, Philip Lawson, James Burton, Ronald Corp, Philip Stopford, Andrew Carter, Jamie W. Hall and Jack Gibbons.

The verses of the hymn progress through the story of Jesus told in his own voice. An innovative feature of the telling is that Jesus' life is repeatedly characterized as a dance. This device was later used in the modern hymn "Lord of the Dance".

== Lyrics ==
Tomorrow shall be my dancing day;
I would my true love did so chance
To see the legend of my play,
To call my true love to my dance;

Chorus (sung after each verse)
Sing, oh! my love, oh! my love, my love, my love,
This have I done for my true love.

Then was I born of a virgin pure,
Of her I took fleshly substance
Thus was I knit to man's nature
To call my true love to my dance.

In a manger laid, and wrapped I was
So very poor, this was my chance
Betwixt an ox and a silly poor ass
To call my true love to my dance.

Then afterwards baptized I was;
The Holy Ghost on me did glance,
My Father’s voice heard I from above,
To call my true love to my dance.

Into the desert I was led,
Where I fasted without substance;
The Devil bade me make stones my bread,
To have me break my true love's dance.

The Jews on me they made great suit,
And with me made great variance,
Because they loved darkness rather than light,
To call my true love to my dance.

For thirty pence Judas me sold,
His covetousness for to advance:
Mark whom I kiss, the same do hold!
The same is he shall lead the dance.

Before Pilate the Jews me brought,
Where Barabbas had deliverance;
They scourged me and set me at nought,
Judged me to die to lead the dance.

Then on the cross hanged I was,
Where a spear my heart did glance;
There issued forth both water and blood,
To call my true love to my dance.

Then down to hell I took my way
For my true love's deliverance,
And rose again on the third day,
Up to my true love and the dance.

Then up to heaven I did ascend,
Where now I dwell in sure substance
On the right hand of God, that man
May come unto the general dance.
