= Mr Shilkret's Maggot =

1932 orchestral work by Gustav Holst

- Jazz-band piece
- by Gustav Holst
- The composer c. 1921. Photo by Herbert Lambert
- Composed: 1932
- Performed: 1968, re-arranged by Imogen Holst as 'Capriccio'
- Movements: One (approx. six minutes)

Mr Shilkret's Maggot is a short piece for jazz band by the English composer Gustav Holst, completed in 1932. It was composed at the request of Nat Shilkret, an American musician, composer and musical director.

'Maggot' is an archaic term, described as a 'dance tune...often light and playful', in the book by John Playford, The English Dancing Master (1651–1728 editions). The term could also mean 'whim' or 'delight', and the dance was traditionally a kind of hornpipe.

Mr Shilkret's Maggot was first performed in 1968, in a new arrangement for small orchestra by Imogen Holst, who entitled it Capriccio.

== Origin of the work ==
Holst went to America in 1932, where he lectured in composition at Harvard University and conducted concerts with the Boston Symphony Orchestra. The programme included four of his works: St Paul's Suite, Hammersmith, The Perfect Fool and The Planets.

While in America, Holst met Nat Shilkret, director of the RCA Victor Symphony Orchestra, who commissioned him to compose a piece based on English or American folk tunes.

According to Chris Cope, Chair of The Holst Society, the composer completed the piece in early May that year, and called it Mr Shilkret’s Maggot. In a 2019 lecture, Cope observed that a popular novel in the early 1930s had been Mr Fortune’s Maggot.

Shilkret spoke highly of the piece but never played it. He rejected it because it wasn't what he had in mind, and not based on folk tunes. Holst declined Shilkret's offer of another $200 to complete the piece as originally requested.

Imogen Holst quoted a letter sent to her by her father on 13 May 1932:

“On May 1, I started sketching a piece for Shilkret’s Radio jazz band in N.Y. I finished the sketch on the 4th and the full score on the 8th and the piano duet on the 11th . . . Shilkret wanted something on American airs but I’ve left them out because I prefer my own so he may reject the thing. But I’m hoping to hear it in N.Y. Usually when I write things in a hurry, I feel unwell when the result is played.”

In his letter to Holst's agent in New York on 29 November 1932, Shilkret described it as a 'modernistic' composition and wrote:

“I am very enthusiastic about this little number and hate to give it up, but I cannot play it... Will Mr. Holst write me another composition (I think I mentioned 'Three Blind Mice' to him) for the stipulated $200.00?"

Chris Cope finds the work very appealing, although he says it isn't jazz, and wasn't suitable for a 1930s radio orchestra. Imogen Holst wrote that her father never got around to revisiting the work, as he was very busy at the time and undergoing medical treatment.

== Recordings ==
Orchestra	Conductor	Year	Label
English Chamber Orchestra	Imogen Holst	1992	Lyrita
Philharmonia a Vent	John Boyd	2005	Klavier
London Symphony Orchestra	Richard Hickox	2016	Chandos
Tredegar Town Band	Ian Porthouse	2024	World of Brass

Sources: WorldCat and Apple Classical

== Score ==
Mr Shilkret's Maggot on WorldCat
