= Terzetto for flute, oboe and viola =

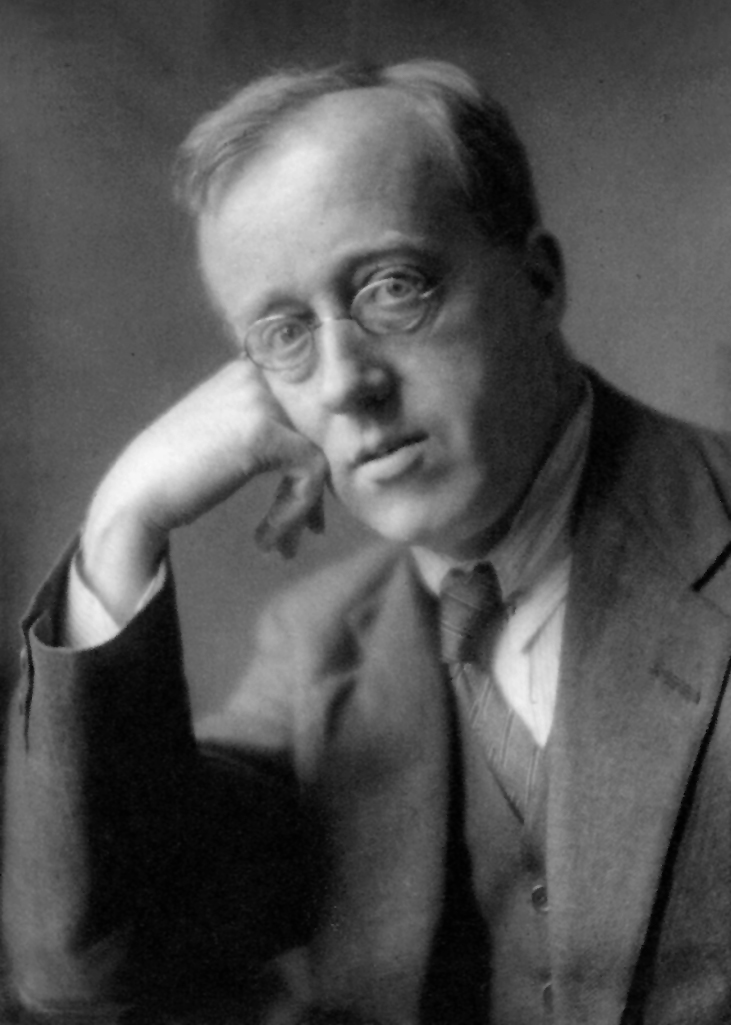
Gustav Holst circa 1921

The Terzetto for flute, oboe and viola (H158), written by Gustav Holst in 1925 and first performed the following year, comprises two movements marked Allegretto and Un poco vivace. Each of the three parts is written in a different key throughout, though Holst was careful to minimise dissonance. It is the only work of chamber music written by Holst in his mature style. The Terzetto was initially not one of Holst's more popular works, but has since gained an established place in the repertoire and been highly praised by critics.

== Composition and first performances ==
In 1925, the year in which Holst's opera At the Boar's Head and his Choral Symphony were premiered, he completed a much smaller-scale work, the Terzetto. An experiment in polytonality, it was not an easy work to compose, Holst being worried whether in performance the work would match his conception of it. He wrote to his friend the critic Edwin Evans that it would "probably be either chamber music or waste paper". An initial play through the same year left the composer uncertain whether it really worked, and baffled several other auditors. It was first performed publicly on 2 March 1926 at the Faculty of Arts Gallery, Golden Square, London by Léon Goossens (oboe), Albert Fransella (flute), and Harry Berly (viola). When they played the work again on 18 June in Seaford House, Belgrave Square the performance was broadcast by the BBC. Holst had to hear it several times before coming around to liking it; he recycled parts of it for his 7 Partsongs (1925–1926) and Double Concerto (1929).

== Publication and reception ==
Audiences were generally unsympathetic during Holst's lifetime, and critical reviews were initially mixed. While The Musical Times's tentative judgement was that "at a single hearing one can get no further than to follow [the three instruments'] fortunes with something between interest and admiration", the Musical News and Herald dismissed it as "a perfectly empty little piece of polytonality". An obituary of Holst in 1934 called the Terzetto "a pleasant little work, the virtuosity of which is scarcely realised until one examines the score". Other critics were disappointed by the lack of dissonance. It was first published only in 1944, and in 1978 was re-edited by Imogen Holst, the composer's daughter, both with the original instrumentation and in a transcription for flute, oboe and clarinet by R. James Whipple. By 1999 the Terzetto could be spoken of as being "well established as a British repertoire favourite". Modern critics have called it "exquisite", "deliciously ingenious", and "a small masterpiece" with "a quiet jewel-like perfection".

== Analysis ==
The work is in two movements. The first, a lyrical Allegretto, consists of three main sections separated by chorale-like melodies. The second, marked Un poco vivace, is a mainly light-hearted scherzo, fugal with unobtrusive dance rhythms, though interrupted by more melancholy meno mosso passages; this movement culminates in arpeggios for all three instruments. Each instrument is given its different key signature in the score, though Vaughan Williams told Holst that the three keys were "more seen by the eye than felt by the ear". This remark alludes to Holst's careful avoidance of dissonance wherever possible in favour of what has been called "a non-functional triadic harmony" or "a composite tonality". His efforts to reconcile the three keys, partly by the use of melodies which can be seen as folk-like or loosely modal, had the effect of making this work, despite its polytonality, less astringent than was by that date normal for Holst, and certainly less dissonant than other multi-key works of the time such as Milhaud's chamber symphonies and Ravel's Sonata for Violin and Cello.

== Commercial recordings ==
=== Original version ===
- Peter Pears, Norbert Brainin, Richard Adeney, Cecil Aronowitz, Peter Graeme, Viola Tunnard (1967). Holst: Vocal and Instrumental Music (LP). Argo. ZRG 5497.
- James Dunham, Westwood Wind Quintet, Jack Sanders (2003). Viola and the Winds (CD). UPC. 00941476472-0.
- Chamber Music Palm Beach (2006). Summer Travels (CD). Klavier. KCD-11160.
- James Turnbull (2013). The English Oboe: Rediscovered (CD). Champs Hill. CHRCD 051. First movement only

=== Transcription for flute, oboe and clarinet ===
- Ensemble Arabesques (2017). Gustav Holst Kammermusik (CD). Farao Classics. B108098.

=== Transcription for flute, oboe and cello ===
- Huntingdon Trio (1987). Collage (CD). Leonarda. LE 325.
