= Walter Hyde =

English tenor, actor, and music educator (1875–1951)

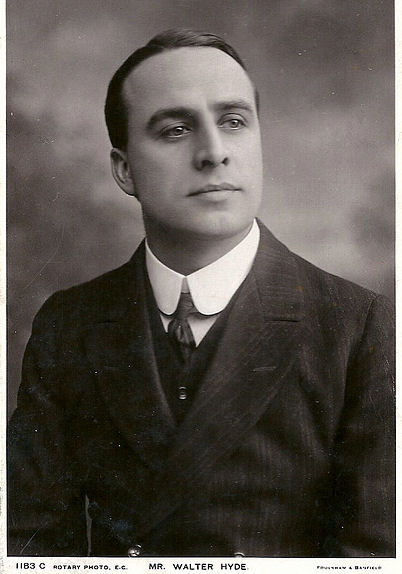
Walter Hyde

A Wand'ring Minstrel I
Hyde sings "A Wand'ring Minstrel I" from The Mikado, 1907

Walter Hyde (6 February 1875 – 11 November 1951) was a British tenor, actor and teacher of voice whose career spanned genres from musical theatre to grand opera. In 1901 he sang Borrachio in the premiere of Stanford's Much Ado About Nothing and soon appeared in London's West End in light opera and Edwardian musical comedy. He appeared regularly at the Royal Opera House in Covent Garden between 1908 and 1924, becoming known for roles in Wagner operas, among others, both in Britain and America. He was also in demand as a concert artist. In his later years he was Professor of Voice at the Guildhall School of Music where his students included Geraint Evans and Owen Brannigan.

== Early life ==
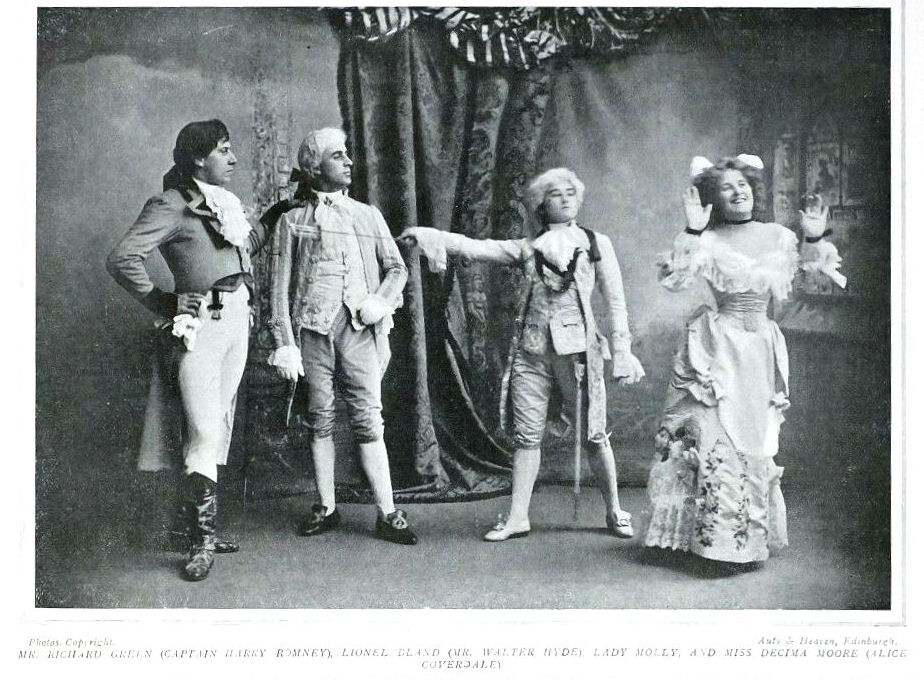
Richard Green (left), Hyde, Sybil Arundale, and Decima Moore (right) in My Lady Molly (1903)

Hyde was born in the Kings Norton area of Birmingham in 1875, the third son of Henry Michael Hyde (1848–1920), a carpenter, and Elizabeth née Hiley (1851–1932). His twin brothers, Harry and Charles, were two years older. The family had musical inclinations. Hyde later recalled:

My earliest recollection of things musical is going to church one Sunday morning with my father, who was principal tenor in the choir. I was presented to an elderly, dignified gentleman, who asked me to sing "Doh, re, mi." With all the assurance that the mature age of six could command, I stammered, `Yes, sir.' There was a touch of comedy behind all this, because the smallest surplice was much too large for my tiny body. However, it was placed upon me, and I walked up the aisle with the other members of the choir – holding huge folds of starched linen in my, then, small hands – I was a choir boy. At that early age I could read, and before I could tell the time I could read music.

For six years Hyde was a Chorister at the Chapel Royal in London. Intent on becoming a tenor, in 1895 he became one of the first students to enroll at the recently restructured Music Department at the Birmingham and Midland Institute. He received lessons in voice before winning a £40-per-annum (Note: £40 in 1895 is approximately equivalent to £4,547 in 2025.) scholarship to the Royal College of Music, where he studied composition under Joseph Parry and Charles Villiers Stanford and harmony and orchestration with Walter Parratt, among others. He received tuition in singing from Gustave Garcia.

== Early career ==
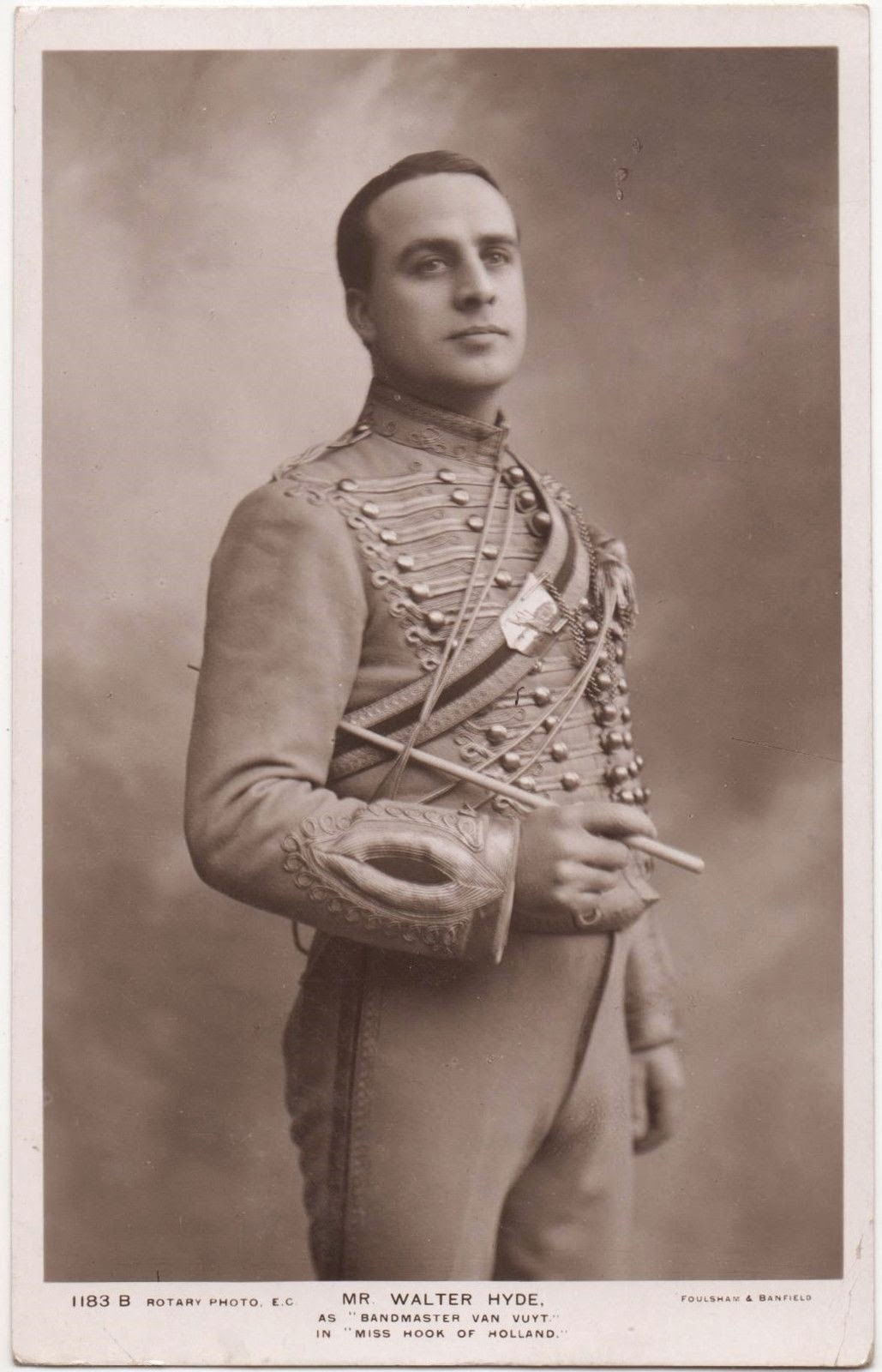
Hyde in Miss Hook of Holland (1907)

On graduating Hyde was engaged by the Royal Opera House in Covent Garden to create the role of Borrachio in the premiere of Stanford's Much Ado About Nothing on 30 May 1901. He next created the role of Lionel Bland in the comic opera My Lady Molly at Brighton in 1902, and when the show transferred to Terry's Theatre in London on 14 March 1903 Hyde continued in the role, making his West End début. From 1905 Hyde made a series of recordings for Edison Records and others including duets with the bass-baritone Peter Dawson. On 14 June 1905 he married Emma "Esme" Elizabeth Atherden (1879–1964) in St Leonard's Church in Marston Green near Solihull. Esme was a soprano who had sung in Messiah that year in Hull. The couple had three children: Denis Atherden Hyde (1907–1911), Walter Siegmund Hyde (1909–1989) and Joan Valerie Hyde (1913–1999).

In December 1906 Hyde oversaw the premiere in London of a comic opera adaptation of The Vicar of Wakefield on behalf of the composer Liza Lehmann at the Prince of Wales Theatre starring Isabel Jay as Olivia and David Bispham as the Vicar; however, the brogue of the Irish tenor engaged to play Squire Thornhill being incomprehensible to audiences, Hyde took on the role at short notice. On 21 August 1907 he opened as Andrea, the lead male role in The Three Kisses at the Apollo Theatre in London opposite Caroline Hatchard as Marietta. In late 1907 he made two recordings of Gilbert and Sullivan operas for Odeon Records, singing Ralph Rackstraw in H.M.S. Pinafore and Nanki-Poo in The Mikado. Earlier in 1907 he recorded excerpts from H.M.S. Pinafore for the Russell Hunting Record Company.

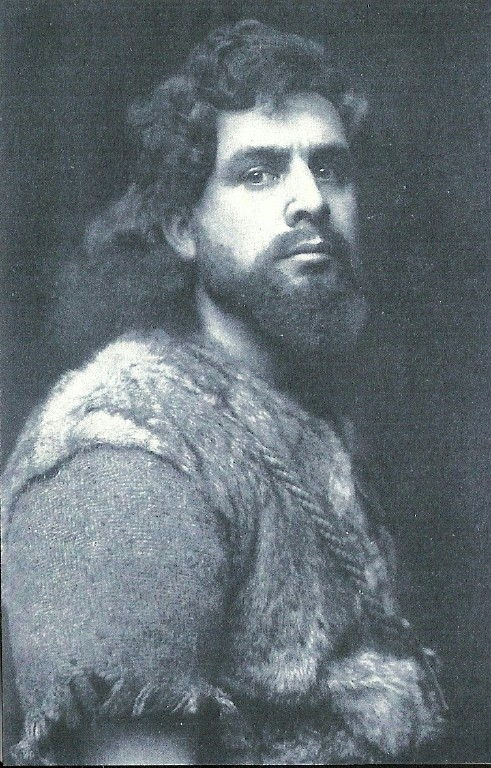
Hyde as Siegmund in Die Walküre at the Royal Opera House (1908)

Hyde was appearing as Bandmaster van Vuyt in Miss Hook of Holland when he impressed Percy Pitt who introduced him to Hans Richter. Richter was preparing for a 1908 production of Wagner's Der Ring des Nibelungen in English at the Royal Opera House and cast Hyde as Froh in Das Rheingold and Siegmund in Die Walküre. Hyde accompanied Richter and the rest of the cast in concerts at Manchester and Leeds where they sang Act I of Die Walküre; Hyde would continue to sing Wagner roles for the rest of his career. By 1909 he was singing tenor roles in oratorio at the Hereford and Birmingham Festivals and continued to do so up to and including the Leeds Festival of 1928. In May 1909 Hyde made his début in Italian opera at the Royal Opera House as Pinkerton in Madama Butterfly followed by Gluck's Armide, In November 1909 he sang in Berlioz's The Damnation of Faust in a Proms concert under the baton of Henry Wood repeated two days later in a Royal Command Performance at Windsor Castle. The same year, Hyde returned to the Royal Opera House as Loge in Das Rheingold and Siegmund in Die Walküre.

== 1910 to 1914 ==
In January 1910 he sang Walther in an English-language version of Die Meistersinger von Nürnberg under the baton of Richter. For Thomas Beecham's first season at the Royal Opera House in February 1910 Hyde sang Sali in A Village Romeo and Juliet by Frederick Delius. In March 1910 Beecham revived Sullivan's Ivanhoe with Hyde in the title role and Percy Pitt conducting. For Richter Hyde then appeared at the Metropolitan Opera Company in New York and in a tour of the Midwestern United States. In March 1910 he sang Siegmund in Die Walküre (in German) and Pinkerton in Madama Butterfly in Baltimore, Maryland, and Siegmund in New York. Upon his return to Britain in the autumn of 1910 Hyde appeared as Lionel in Edmond Missa's Muguette, Ferrando in Così fan tutte in English and Toni in Clutsam's A Summer Night. For Beecham's second season at Covent Garden he was Laertes in Ambroise Thomas's Hamlet, Don Ottavio in Don Giovanni, Erik in Der Fliegende Hollander and sang in Gounod's Faust. In March and April 1911 Hyde sang Loge in Das Rheingold and Siegmund in Die Walküre in Leeds, Manchester and Glasgow, while May 1911 saw him playing the title role in Baron Trenck at the Whitney Theatre.

From late 1911 Hyde was in America, where, accompanied by his wife, he was to remain for nearly two years touring in light opera and singing in concerts. In 1912 he appeared as the title character in a revival of Reginald De Koven's Robin Hood at the New Amsterdam Theatre and the Knickerbocker Theatre in New York before taking the opera to the Princess Theatre in Toronto in Canada in March 1913.

On returning to England in 1913 Hyde toured the provinces singing in Wagnerian tenor roles before singing Pelléas in September 1913 in the first performance in English of Debussy's Pelléas and Mélisande at Birmingham. In early 1914 Hyde was booked to sing the title role in Lohengrin at the Hungarian State Opera House, but a misunderstanding over language (he thought he was to sing in German and did not know the role in English) resulted in the organisers switching to Die Meistersinger, which he sang in English.

== War years and later career ==
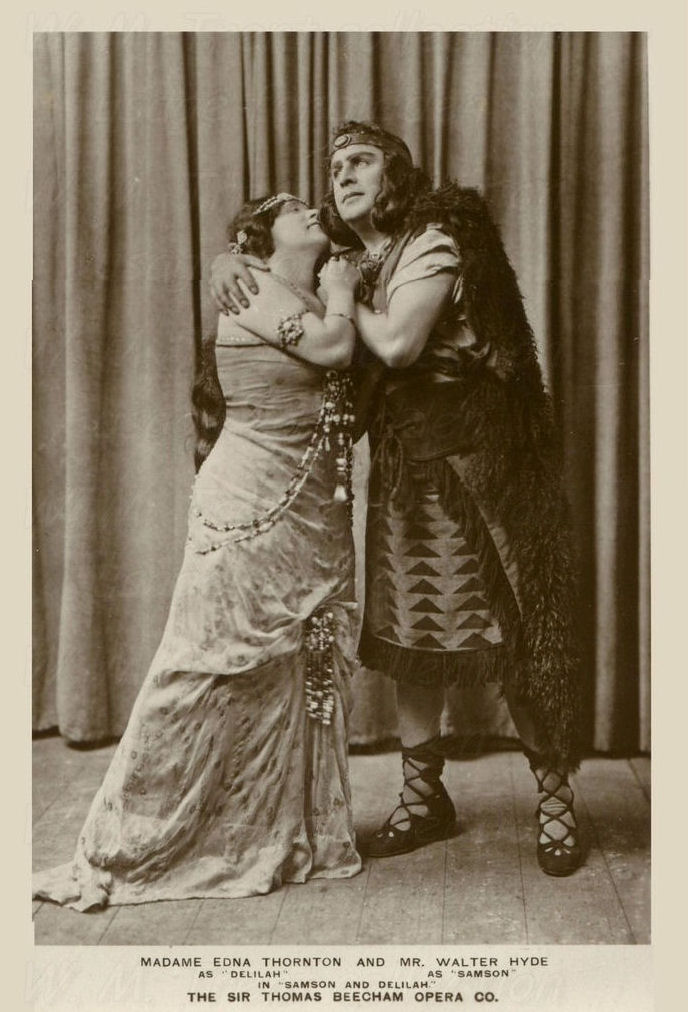
Hyde and Edna Thornton in the title roles in Samson and Delilah by Saint-Saëns (1919)

Hyde joined Lena Ashwell's Firing Line concert party which, in the autumn of 1914, took him to the Pavilion Theatre in Torquay, where he sang works by Parry, Bax and Berlioz at a Royal Philharmonic Society concert. In 1915 he joined the Beecham Opera Company with whom, at Manchester in 1917, he was Rothesay in Bizet's The Fair Maid of Perth in its first performance in English. In May 1917 he sang Dick Johnson in Puccini's Girl of the Golden West in English at the Theatre Royal, Drury Lane, where in September he sang in Rimsky-Korsakov's The Maid of Pskov in that piece's first performance in English. In 1918 at Manchester under Beecham's baton he sang in Mendelssohn's oratorio Elijah. In June of that year he sang Phoebus in Bach's cantata Phoebus and Pan during Beecham's Summer Season at Drury Lane, as well as Siegmund in Die Walküre. In 1917 and again in 1919 he played Samson in Saint-Saëns' Samson and Delilah.

In May 1919 he sang Muezzin in Isidore de Lara's Nail, while in November that year he appeared in the title role in Wagner's Parsifal at Covent Garden, reprising the role in February 1920 at the same venue, followed by The Fair Maid of Perth and Pedrillo and Sali in A Village Romeo and Juliet. After the failure of the Beecham Opera Company in 1920 various members of that Company including Hyde formed the British National Opera Company (BNOC), which operated from 1922 to 1929 with Hyde as a director, and for the company he sang in Parsifal and as Siegmund in Die Walküre, by now his signature role.

During 1923 Hyde created the role of the Troubador in Holst's The Perfect Fool and sang in Wagner's Ring cycle at the Royal Opera House in the first production since the end of the War. Commencing on Boxing Day at Covent Garden that year, he sang in Tannhäuser, Die Walküre, The Magic Flute and as Belmonte in Il Seraglio. In January 1924 he was Admetus in Boughton's Alkestis. Hyde continued to sing in the mid-1920s, mainly in the provinces, but occasionally in a London season with the BNOC, including in Pelléas and Mélisande in English. In 1926 in Manchester he sang in Tannhäuser and in 1927 he gave his Siegmund in Die Walküre at the Golders Green Hippodrome.

== Last years ==
His farewell performances were at the Leeds Triennial Festival in October 1928 where he sang in Handel's Ode for St. Cecilia's Day and Berlioz's Te Deum under Beecham's baton.

On retiring from the theatre and concert platform in 1928 Hyde took up an appointment as Professor of Voice at the Guildhall School of Music in London where his wife also was on the staff and where he taught a new generation of performers including Geraint Evans, Eric Shilling, David Lloyd, Norman Walker, Owen Brannigan and Gwen Catley.

Hyde died in London on 11 November 1951 at New End Hospital in Hampstead. In his will he left his widow £550 9s 3d.
