= List of compositions by Jane Joseph =

This is a list of compositions by Jane Joseph (1894–1929) may be incomplete. Many of her works, particularly those written for performance at amateur musical events, were unpublished; some have been lost, while in some cases manuscripts are held in private or institutional hands. The list is divided between (1) published works, or works where there is a record of performance and (2) other unpublished works.

== Compositions ==
=== Table 1: Works published and/or with evidence of performance ===
The following works have either been published or there is reasonable evidence of their performance. Details of composition dates and dates of publication are incomplete; information can be added or amended as necessary.

Genre	Approx. date	Title	Forces	Publication information	Notes	Refs
Choral and vocal	1913	Song: "The Carrion Crow"	Unaccompanied female voices (SSA)	Stainer and Bell, London 1916		
Choral and vocal	1913	Song: "There Were Three Ravens"	Unaccompanied voices (SATBarB)	Not published	Apparently written at the same time as "The Carrion Crow"	
Choral and vocal	1916	"Wassail Song"	Female voices (SSA)	Stainer and Bell, London 1916		
Choral and vocal	1918	Hymn	Female voices	Not published	Lost - not identifiable. Performed at the Thaxted Whitsun music festival, 1918	
Choral and vocal	1920	Song cycle: Mirage (5 songs)	Female voice, string quartet accompaniment	Not published. Manuscript held in Royal College of Music	Performance history uncertain. Two songs (with piano) may have been given at a Society of Women Musicians concert, 17 January 1920	
Choral and vocal	1921	Seven two-part songs	Sopranos and piano accompaniment	Stainer and Bell, London 1921	Performed at a Society of Women Musicians concert in 1922	
Choral and vocal	1921	A Festival Venite	Chorus and orchestra	Stainer and Bell, London 1922	Performed at the Queen's Hall, London, 13 June 1923. Modern performance by Glasgow University Chapel Choir directed by Katy Lavinia Cooper, 21 February 2018)	
Choral and vocal	1922	Hymn for Whitsuntide	Unaccompanied chorus for mixed voices	Arnold's Choral Music, London 1924	Probably first sung at the Blackheath Whitsun music festival, 1922. Broadcast by the Purcell Singers in 1968	
Choral and vocal	undated	Three old carols: "The Three Kings", "Adam lay i-bounden", "Of one that is so fair"	Unaccompanied female voices (SSA)	Oxford University Press	Performance details uncertain	
Choral and vocal	undated	Carol: "Noel"	Unison voices with piano accompaniment	Published 1925 by Edward Arnold & Co.	Setting of Hilaire Belloc verses	
Choral and vocal	undated	Morley Rounds	Choir	Oxford University Press	Performance details uncertain. Includes an Agnus Dei	
Choral and vocal	undated	Carol: "A Little Childe There Is Ibore"	Female voices (SSA) and orchestral accompaniment	Published (with organ accompaniment) by Bardic Edition Music Publishers	Orchestral score lost. Broadcast (with a strings accompaniment) by the BBC 21 December 1995	
Choral and vocal	undated	Hymn Tune: Eskdale	Piano accompaniment	In Enlarged Songs of Praise, 1931	A setting of Thomas Traherne's Sweet Infancy	
Instrumental	1922	Short string quartet in A minor	String quartet	Accepted for publication by J. B. Cramer & Co. but not ultimately published	Performed by the Winifred Smith Quartet 17 December 1922	
Instrumental	undated	Cradle Song	Strings and ad lib piano	Posthumously published by Bardic Edition Music Publishers		
Orchestral	1916	Incidental Music Countess Cathleen	Orchestra	Not published	Written for a Girton performance of W. B. Yeats's play	
Orchestral	1918	Morris Dance	Orchestra	Published posthumously (1931) by Bardic Edition Music Publishers	Originally Barbara Noel's Morris	
Orchestral	1919	Bergamask	Orchestra	Published posthumously (1931) by Bardic Edition Music Publishers	First performed 13 or 14 November 1919 at the Royal College of Music	
Orchestral	1919	Three pieces for small orchestra	Reduced orchestral forces	Not published	Performed at St Paul's Girls' School 8 February 1919. Probably used in Before the Dawn incidental music	
Orchestral	1921	Incidental music Before the Dawn	Not known	Not published	Probably performed around Christmas 1921 at St Paul's Girls' School	
Orchestral	undated	Village Dance	4 flutes, oboe, clarinet, horn, piano, harmonium, timpani and percussion	Posthumously published by Bardic Edition Music Publishers	Written for performance at St Paul's Girls' School	
Piano works	1919	Bergamask	Piano	Not published	Piano version of orchestral work	
Piano works	1920	Seven Short Pieces for piano	Piano	Stainer and Bell, London 1920		
Piano works	1924	Playing Time duets	Piano	Arnold's, London 1924		
Piano works	1924	Scrap Book	Piano	Arnold's, London 1924		
Piano works	1925	Five Programme Pieces	Piano	Arnold's, London 1924		
Piano works	1925	Suite of Five Pieces	Piano	Oxford University Press		

=== Table 2: Unpublished works, no performance details ===
This listing is based on Gustav Holst's tribute essay in The Monthly Musical Record, 1 April 1931, which included a list of Joseph's unpublished works.

Choral and vocal

- Five songs with strings accompaniment: "Two Doves"; "Oh, Roses"; "Sleep, cast thy canopy"; "I'll give my love an apple" (with oboe); "The seeds of love"
- Choruses with orchestra

- Christmas Cantata
- A Wedding Antiphon
- Kyrie
- Christmas Song
- "The Night"
- "The Morning Watch"

Instrumental

- Miniature Quartet (oboe, violin, viola and violoncello)
- Variations on an American Air (horn and piano)
- Duet (violin and cello)
- Allegretto (two flutes, two oboes, one clarinet, one bassoon)
- Two Short Trios (violin, cello and piano)

Orchestral

- Full orchestra

- Passepied
- "I will give my love an apple"
- Andante
- Symphonic Dance
- Ballet music: "The Enamoured Shepherd"

- String orchestra

- Sonatina for School Bands
- Rabbit Dance
- Country Dance

Incidental Music to Plays.

- Amy Clarke's Play
- Famine Song
- Awake the Shade
- Spirit Music
- The Moon's Eclipse
- Procession and Ballet

Also: Nine piano pieces; 4 unaccompanied songs; 29 songs with piano; 2 two-part songs with piano; 26 choral pieces, unaccompanied; 10 orchestral arrangements (including folk-dances); 28 unison songs (arranged with orchestra); 5 choral pieces (arrangements, unaccompanied); 5 rounds.
