= Seven Part-Songs =

1925–1926 composition by Gustav Holst

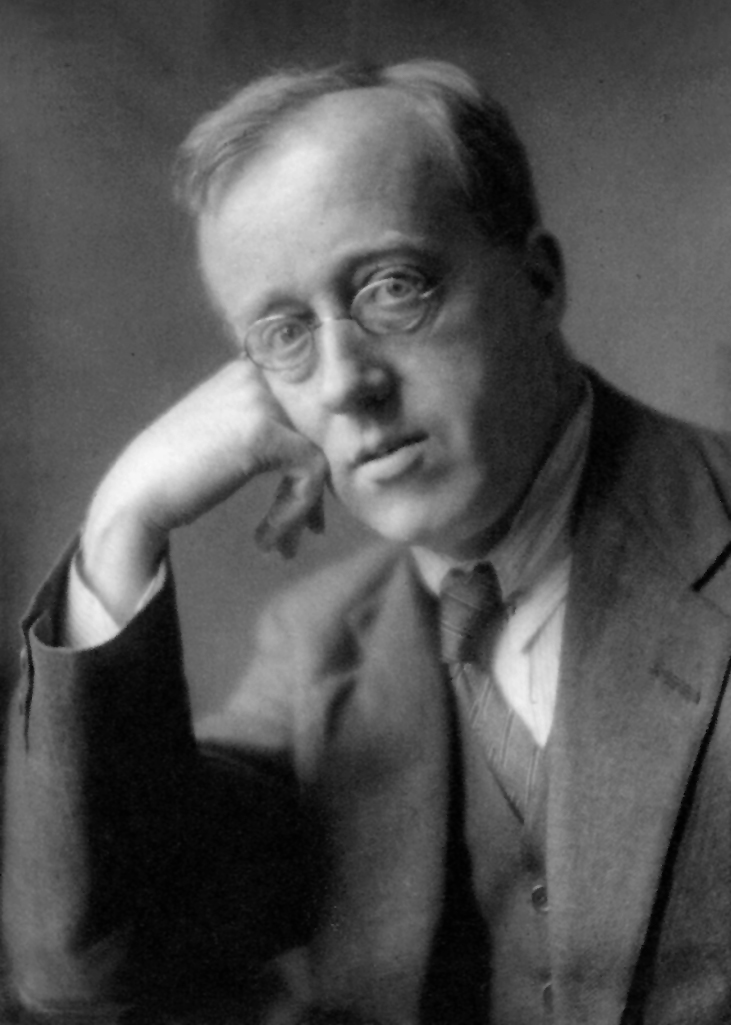
Gustav Holst ca. 1921

Seven Part-Songs, Op. 44, H. 162, is a work for soprano, female chorus and strings written by the English composer Gustav Holst in 1925–26. It sets poems by Robert Bridges. It has been commercially recorded in performances conducted by Imogen Holst, Hilary Davan Wetton, and Richard Hickox, and has received much praise from critics for the beauty of its vocal writing, one calling it "an unjustifiably neglected masterpiece".

== Settings ==
All of the poems set were published in Robert Bridges Poetical Works (1898–1905).

1. Say, Who Is This?
2. O Love, I Complain
3. Angel Spirits of Sleep
4. When First We Met
5. Sorrow and Joy
6. Love on My Heart from Heaven Fell
7. Assemble, All Ye Maidens (Elegy on a Lady Whom Grief for the Death of Her Betrothed Killed)

Holst dedicated nos. 1, 2 and 3 to Dr J. E. Wallace and the Liverpool Bach Choir; nos. 4, 5 and 6 to Harold Brooke; and no. 7 to Frank Duckworth. No. 7 is by far the longest part-song; it is often performed separately.

== Composition ==
The friendship between Gustav Holst and the Poet Laureate Robert Bridges, which was to become a close one, began in 1925 when Holst approached him over the copyright of a poem Holst intended to set. Bridges expressed himself delighted with the resulting motet, "Sing Me the Men", and Holst turned to Bridges' poems with a view to further settings. He wrote "Assemble, All Ye Maidens" and "Love on My Heart from Heaven Fell" the same year, and the other five part-songs in 1926. Of his composition of "Say, Who Is This" Holst wrote that "I did [it] the moment I caught sight of the words, since when I've been wondering what they mean. The first line begins 'Say, who is this with silvered hair?' Which is just what I want to know!"

== First performances ==
On 28 November 1925, the soprano Isabel I'Anson and the Sandon Studios Society gave the first performance of "Love on My Heart from Heaven Fell" at the Liberty Buildings, Liverpool, under the baton of Gordon E. Stutely. 24 May 1927, "Assemble, All Ye Maidens" was sung by the Bach Choir at the Queen's Hall, London, Ralph Vaughan Williams conducting.

The first complete performance of the set was at an informal concert given at Bridges' home in Boars Hill, near Oxford, on 2 July 1927 in the presence of the poet himself and a number of distinguished musicians and poets. Holst himself conducted players and singers (including his daughter Imogen) drawn from his pupils at St Paul's Girls' School, first rehearsing the part-songs, then giving two successive performances. Bridges wrote to Holst that his old-fashioned taste in music had hindered his understanding of the piece, but that he eventually came to a full appreciation of it. In July 1929 Holst and a St Paul's ensemble recreated the concert, again at Bridges' home.

== Reception ==
From the very first London performance of any of the Seven Part-Songs, namely "Assemble, All Ye Maidens", there were excellent reviews. The Times wrote that "It is very beautiful, with that cold, pure beauty which the composer knows so well how to get from a few simple vocal strains, long sustained drones or pedal notes on the strings and a basso ostinato in quintuple time enriching the rhythmic movement of the later stanzas." The Musical Times called it a "most beautifully planned...piece [which] conjures up a vision of a group of Burne-Jones maidens...a picture without any softness, but imaginative and consistent in quite a rare way". And for The Monthly Musical Record it was "a very beautiful and distinguished example of Holst's latter style".

Imogen Holst judged in 1951 that the Seven Part-Songs "have a welcome spontaneity about them, and they sound as if he was no longer quite so much afraid of sensuous beauty". More recent critics have found much to praise: "the choral writing [is] fluently beautiful", "a ravishingly dreamy, mystical beauty", "the subtlety of the word setting is matched by the gracious ease of the vocal writing". Rob Barnett has written of the "graceful and light-palated delights" of a ""delicate and ascetically eloquent" work, and Philip Reed of its "acute sensitivity to Bridges's texts". Stephen Hall believed the work "cannot be overrated", and Julian Haylock called it "an unjustifiably neglected masterpiece".

== Recordings ==
- English Chamber Orchestra, Purcell Singers, cond. Imogen Holst (1966). Six Medieval Lyrics/Seven Part Songs (LP). Argo. ZRG 5495.
- The Holst Singers, The Holst Orchestra, cond. Hilary Davan Wetton (1989). Holst: The Evening Watch and Other Choral Music (CD). Hyperion. CDA66329.
- Joyful Company of Singers, cond. Richard Hickox (1999). Holst: The Cloud Messenger, A Choral Fantasia, Part-Songs (CD). Chandos. CHAN 241-6.
