= Eric Mackay =

George Eric Mackay (1835–2 June 1898) was an English minor poet, now remembered as the sponging half-brother of Marie Corelli, the best-selling novelist. Mackay and Corelli, born Mary Mackay, were the children of Charles Mackay, by different mothers (Mary was illegitimate, with Charles marrying her mother subsequently).

As a poet he is described as "execrable", and reliant on Corelli's promotion of his works. His first works appeared in periodicals in the early 1860s; he achieved some reputation in his time for Love Letters of a Violinist (1886). It sold 35,000 copies; he repaid Corelli's efforts by implying he wrote her novels.

A 1940 biography of Corelli, George Bullock's Marie Corelli: The Life and Death of a Best-Seller, hinted that the relationship was incestuous; this has generally been discounted, though Eric's laziness and lack of scruples are acknowledged. This was an old rumour, attributed to Edmund Gosse.

Mackay's poem "Elëanor" was set to music by British composer Samuel Coleridge-Taylor. (Song published in 1899 by Novello & Co.)

He was interred in Highgate Cemetery on 4 June 1898.
