= My Lady Molly =

Comedy opera by Sydney Jones, George H. Jessop and others

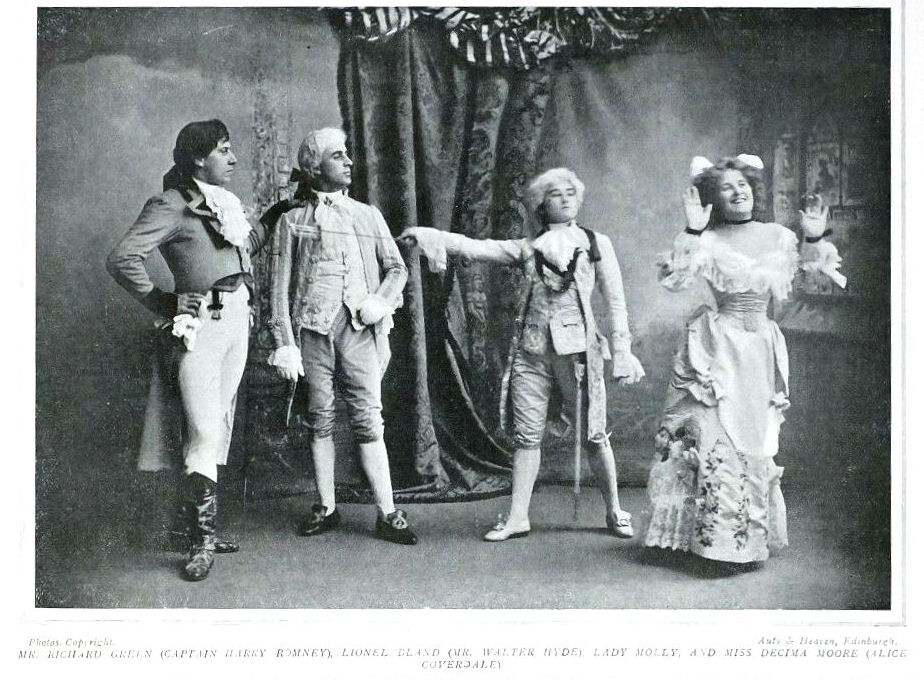
Richard Green (left) as Captain Harry Romner, Walter Hyde as Lionel Bland, Sybil Arundale as Lady Molly, and Decima Moore (right) as Alice Coverdale in My Lady Molly (1903)

My Lady Molly is a 'comedy opera' in two acts with music by Sidney Jones, a libretto by George H. Jessop, and additional lyrics by Percy Greenbank and Charles H. Taylor. The story centers around Lady Molly Martingale, a vivacious young woman, who disguises herself as a man to win the man she loves.

The piece opened at the Theatre Royal in Brighton, England, on 11 August 1902 and then at Terry's Theatre in London on 14 March 1903, under the management of Frederick Mouillot, running for 342 performances. It starred Sybil Arundale and featured Decima Moore. It also enjoyed tours and had a brief Broadway run.

My Lady Molly was the last successful English comic opera in the tradition of Alfred Cellier's Dorothy and Arthur Sullivan's Haddon Hall, as distinguished from the style of the lighter Edwardian musical comedies of the period. A review in The Daily Mail stated:

The audience rejoiced over a departure from the stereotyped, and often vulgar, methods of so-called "musical comedy," and gladly welcomed a clever and artistic comic opera ... brim full of humour and melody. ... Mr. Sidney Jones's pre-eminence among the lighter musical composers [is] amply reflected. ... My Lady Molly is very handsomely and elaborately dressed. ... Miss Sybil Arundale ... is literally as pretty as a picture, playing and singing with a modesty and refinement worthy all praise. The audience showered favours upon her, and her triumph was undoubted. [Hyde, Green and] Moore effectively assisted to procure the general success, and Mr. Bert Gilbert made a great hit as the Irish servant. ... The book ... has been neatly written. ... Great enthusiasm reigned at the fall of the curtain, and Mr. Jones had a fine reception.

== Roles and original cast ==
Sketch from My Lady Molly, in Judy magazine (1903)

- Captain Harry Romney – Richard Green
- Lionel Bland – Walter Hyde
- Sir Miles Coverdale – Chas. F. Cooke
- Mickey O'dowd (Servant to Captain Harry) – Bert Gilbert
- Landlord (of the Coverdale Arms) – H. M. Imano
- Head Groom – William Waite
- Rev. Silas Wapshott (Vicar of Coverdale) – Walter Wright
- Judge Romney (father to Harry) – Cecil Howard
- Lady Molly Martindale – Sybil Arundale/Mavis Hope
- Hester (her confidential maid) – Mabel Allen
- Alice Coverdale (daughter to Sir Miles) – Decima Moore
- Mademoiselle Mirabeau (governess to Alice) – Andrée Corday
- Housekeeper (at Coverdale Arms) – Dorothy Cameron
- Lucy and Allison (chambermaids) – Miss Arundale and Rose Batchelor

== Musical numbers ==
Sketch from My Lady Molly, in Judy magazine (1903)

- Overture

Act I – The Courtyard at Coverdale Arms. "Morning."

- No. 1 - Chorus - "Brushes and brooms sweeping the corridors, dusting the rooms, up with the lark..."
- No. 1a - Landlord - "There is the Key. Let ev'ry man go in and fetch his measure of bran..."
- No. 2 - Landlord, with Chorus - "A man may know no voice of friend; may travel far from kith and kin..."
- No. 3 - Lionel & Chorus of Maidservants - "There's a little maid I know. She is so very sweet..."
- No. 4 - Alice & Lionel - "When we were children, I and you, of course you recollect..."
- Nos. 4a & 5 - Recit. & Quartette - Mirabeau, Alice, Lionel & Landlord - "Your worship's breakfast waits..."
- No. 6 - Mickey, with Chorus - "Ye sarve a man for sivin years and follow him about..."
- No. 7 - Lady Molly & Hester - "Oh, I'll greet him soft and low, fan the old-time embers..."
- No. 8 - Lady Molly, Hester & Mickey - "Wear 'em wid an air, hat an' boots an' them things..."
- No. 9 - Chorus and Solo, Sir Miles - "Ye-ho yoicks! Run to earth, there's the sign! ..."
- No. 10 - Alice, with Chorus - "Now a gallant knight lov'd a maiden fair in medieval fashion..."
- No. 11 - Chorus - "Topers, fling your glasses aside; quit your vows, Sir Lover..."
- No. 12 - Harry & Lionel - "Though you may choose your future bride, I do not dread what you may do..."
- No. 13 - Chorus & Trio - Molly, Hester & Mickey - "Maggie, Winnie, Catkin, Minnie, Alison and Sue..."
- No. 14 - Chorus, Recit. amp; Song - Harry - "We saw the swords, upon our words! the naked steel flash'd out! ..."
- No. 15 - Finale Act I - "Rogue detected! There's a gentleman present here, now in this room..."

Act II – The Hall in Coverdale Castle. "Night."

- No. 16 - Chorus - "How do you do? And you, my dear? You rode, no doubt; I came by post..."
- No. 17 - Alice & Chorus - "I know that I've been naughty all my life; my conduct's most provoking, I'm afraid..."
- No. 18 - Mickey & Mirabeau - "It's dreadfully hard to understand the things you foreigners say..."
- No. 19 - Lady Molly - "When a maiden is wooed by a man, his advances she frequently spurns..."
- No. 20 - Sir Miles, Alice & Lady Molly, with Chorus - "Yoicks ho! Were I younger I'd teach you to dance..."
- No. 21 - Harry - "There's an eye that is watching me all unseen, a bold dark eye with a winsome light..."
- No. 22 - Alice, Molly, Lionel & Harry - "Suppose a Highwayman you were, and went to rob a coach..."
- No. 23 - Entrance of Bridesmaids, and Song - Hester - "What a show of pretty things, light and airy..."
- No. 24 - Flower Chorus - "A chance, dear girls, to exercise your pow'rs; we're ask'd to deck the castle for the fête..."
- No. 25 - Mickey O'Dowd - "There's times when the world is a beautiful place, wid niver an ache nor a trouble..."
- No. 26 - Chorus - Bridal March - "Now the chancel waits the bride, brilliantly lighted, radiant with flow'rs..."
- No. 27 - Song - Mirabeau - "'Opeless ze state of me, sad ees ze fate of me, bygone ze date of me..."
- No. 28 - Chorus - Bridal March - "What has happened, what's the matter? Is it that the bride was nervous? ..."
- No. 29 - Molly & Harry - "I craved for that kiss last year, and a word that you would not say..."
- No. 30 - Finale Act II - "But today, yes, today hope blossoms anew, and the weary days were not all in vain..."
