= Jane Joseph =

English composer (1894–1929)

Jane Joseph, photographed around 1920

Jane Marian Joseph (31 May 1894 – 9 March 1929) was an English composer, arranger, and music teacher. She was a pupil and later associate of the composer Gustav Holst, and was instrumental in the organisation and management of various of the music festivals which Holst sponsored. Many of her works were composed for performance at these festivals and similar occasions. Her early death at age 34, which prevented the full realisation of her talents, was considered by her contemporaries as a considerable loss to English music.

Holst first observed Joseph's potential when he was teaching her composition at St Paul's Girls' School. She began to act as his amanuensis in 1914, when he was composing The Planets, her special responsibility being the preparation of the score for the "Neptune" movement. She continued to assist Holst with transcriptions, arrangements and translations, and was his librettist for the choral ballet The Golden Goose.

During her short professional life she became an active member of the Society of Women Musicians, was the prime mover behind the first Kensington Musical Competition Festival, and helped to found the Kensington Choral Society. She also taught music at a girls' school, where Holst's daughter Imogen was one of her pupils, and became a leading figure in the musical life of Morley College. Two memorial prizes and scholarships were endowed in her name.

Most of Joseph's compositions were never published and are now considered lost. Of her published works, two early short orchestral pieces, Morris Dance and Bergamask won considerable critical praise, although neither became part of the general orchestral repertory. Two choral works, A Festival Venite and A Hymn for Whitsuntide were admired during her lifetime, but never commercially recorded. Since her death, her work has seldom been performed, but occasionally been broadcast. (Note: The British Library Sound Archive collection contains a single recording of Joseph's: the carol "A Little Childe There is Ibore", probably derived from a 1995 BBC broadcast. There is no indication that this recording was issued commercially.) Her carol "A Little Childe There is Ibore" was thought by Holst to be among the best of its kind.

== Biography ==
=== Family background and early childhood ===
Jane Joseph was born on 31 May 1894 at 23 Clanricarde Gardens, in the Notting Hill district of the Borough of Kensington, London, to a prosperous Jewish family. Her father, George Solomon Joseph (1844–1917), a solicitor in his family's firm, had married Henrietta, née Franklin (1861–1938) in 1880. Jane was their fourth child; the youngest of her three brothers was seven years older than her. George Joseph had a deep interest in music, which he passed on to his children; two sons, Frank (1881–1944) and Edwin (1887–1975), became competent string players, while Jane learned piano (she took her first examination at the age of seven) and later, double-bass. In time, Frank's musical children, with Jane and friends, formed the basis of a "Josephs orchestra" that performed concerts at Frank's home for many years.

=== St Paul's Girls' School and Gustav Holst ===
Holst, as drawn by William Rothenstein

In 1909 Joseph won a scholarship to St Paul's Girls' School (SPGS) in Hammersmith. The school had opened in 1904, as an offshoot of the long-established St Paul's School for boys. Its high mistress, Frances Ralph Gray, was a formidable figure with traditional views about female education, who nevertheless provided a lively and varied learning environment in which Joseph excelled. Apart from her academic successes, Joseph played double-bass in the school orchestra, gave an acclaimed piano performance of Bach's D minor keyboard concerto, began to compose, and won a prize for sight-reading. While at the school she composed "The Carrion Crow", a song setting which, in 1914, became her first published work. Outside music she supported the school's Literary Society, where she presented papers on Charlotte Brontë and Samuel Taylor Coleridge. She also won Honours in the examinations of the Royal Drawing Society.

Among the music teachers at SPGS, most significantly in terms of her musical development, Joseph encountered the emergent composer Gustav Holst, then little known, who taught her composition. After leaving the Royal College of Music in 1898 Holst had earned his living as an organist, and as a trombonist in various orchestras, while awaiting critical recognition as a composer. In 1903 he gave up his orchestral appointments to concentrate on composing, but found that he needed a regular income. He became a music teacher, initially at the James Allen's Girls' School in Dulwich; in 1905 he was recommended to Frances Gray by Adine O'Neill, a former pupil of Clara Schumann, who taught piano at SPGS. He was first appointed on a part-time basis to teach singing, and later extended his activities to cover the school's wider music curriculum including conducting and composition. According to the composer Alan Gibbs, Joseph quickly came under Holst's spell, and adopted his principles as her own. Holst later described her as the best girl pupil he ever had: "From the first she showed an individual attitude of mind and an eagerness to absorb all that was beautiful".

=== Student, scribe and teacher, 1913–1918 ===
==== Girton ====
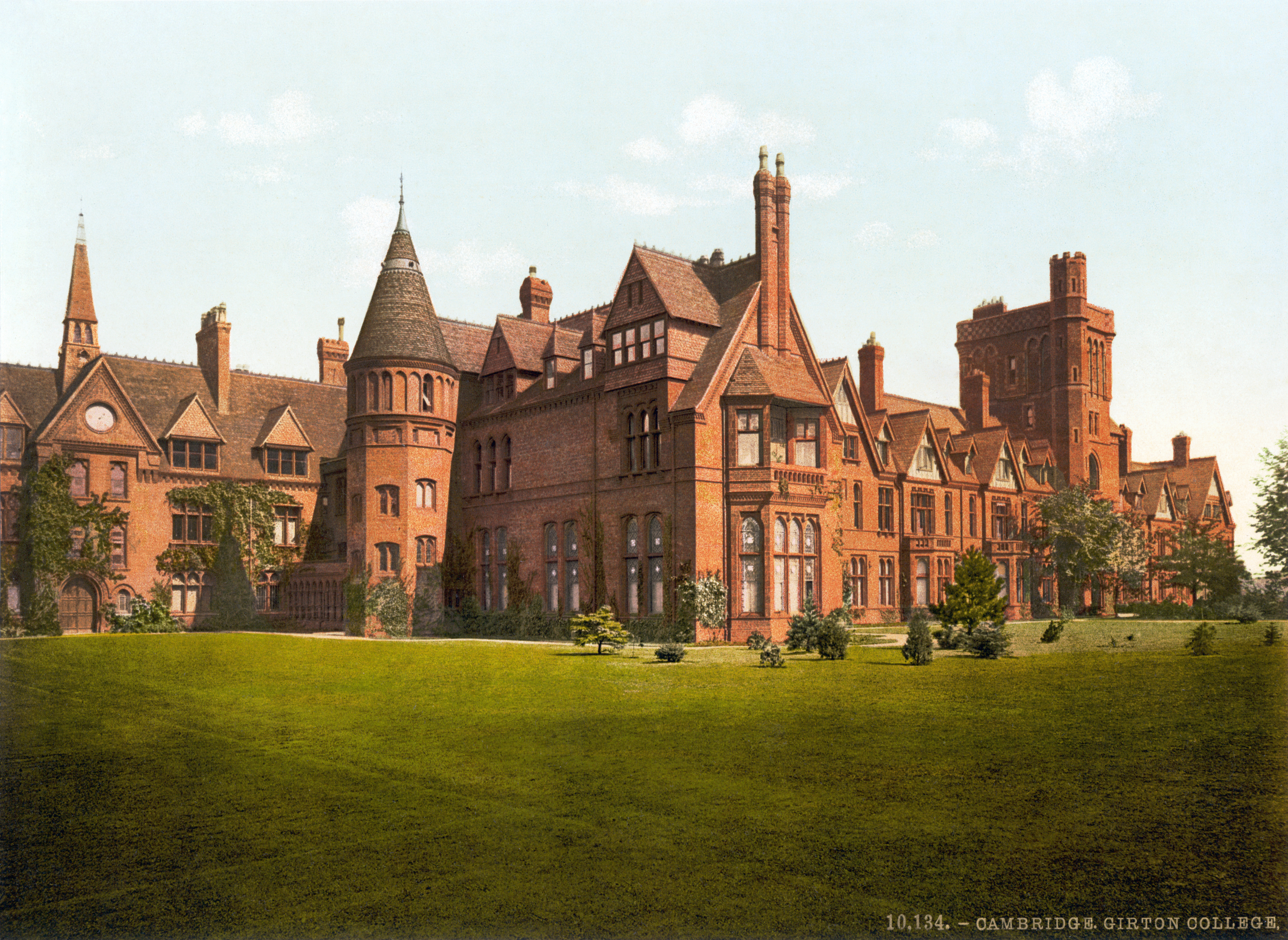
Girton College, Cambridge, early in the 20th century

In the autumn of 1913, at the age of 19, Joseph began studying Classics at Girton College, Cambridge. At that time, under Cambridge University regulations that were not fully repealed until 1948, women were ineligible to receive degrees, although they could sit the degree examinations, in Joseph's case the Classical Tripos. She soon found much in the university's life to divert her from her regular studies: debating, drama and, above all, music. In her first term she became a double-bass player in the Cambridge University Musical Society orchestra, under its conductor Cyril Rootham. She also sang alto in the society's choir, and may have participated in a performance of Berlioz's La damnation de Faust that was praised in the Cambridge Review of 17 June 1914. During vacations she continued her composition studies under Holst; in 1916 her "Wassail Song", a companion piece to "The Carrion Crow", was published. At Girton she wrote incidental music for a performance of W. B. Yeats's verse play The Countess Cathleen, in which she acted the part of the First Dragon.

From 1915 Joseph's association with Holst became closer. Overextended by his teaching duties and other commitments, Holst required assistance in the task of organising his music for publication and performance, and used a group of young women volunteers—his "scribes"—to make fair copies of his scores, write out instrumental or vocal parts, or prepare piano arrangements. In 1915 the composer was working on his largest and best-known work, the orchestral suite The Planets, and invited Joseph, in her vacations, to join his scribes. Among these were Vally Lasker, a piano teacher from SPGS, and Nora Day, who had been a pupil with Joseph at the school and since 1913 had been teaching there. Joseph's main assignment for The Planets was to copy the "Neptune" movement, of which almost the entire original manuscript is written in her hand. For the rest of her career she remained one of Holst's most regular amanuenses, and he came to rely on her more than on any other. Her commitments to musical activities at Girton, combined with her work for Holst, had an adverse effect on her formal studies. In the 1916 Classical Tripos examinations she was awarded only a Class III pass, a disappointing result duly noted in her parting testimonial from the college.

==== Early career ====
When Joseph left Girton, the First World War was at a critical state; the Battle of the Somme had begun on 1 July 1916. Joseph wanted to assist the war effort, and after considering work on the land or in a munitions factory, took up part-time welfare work in Islington. In the autumn of 1916 she began teaching at Eothen, a small private school for girls in Caterham, founded and run by the Misses Catharine and Winifred Pye. In 1917 Holst's ten-year-old daughter Imogen started at the school; soon, under Joseph's guidance the young pupil was composing her own music. Joseph extended her own musical activities by joining the orchestra at Morley College, where Holst was the director of music and where her brother Edwin had played the cello before the war. At first she played the double-bass, but later took French horn lessons, possibly from Adolph Borsdorf; later still, at very short notice, she taught herself the timpani part for a summer concert. By 1918 she was a member of the Morley committee that on 9 March organised and produced an opera burlesque, English Opera as She is Wrote, in which English, Italian, German, French and Russian opera styles were parodied in successive scenes. The performance was a great success and was repeated at several venues. It may have inspired Holst to use parody in his own opera, The Perfect Fool, which he began composing in 1918. In her spare time Joseph founded and ran a choir for Kensington nannies, which took part in local singing contests as the "Linden Singers".

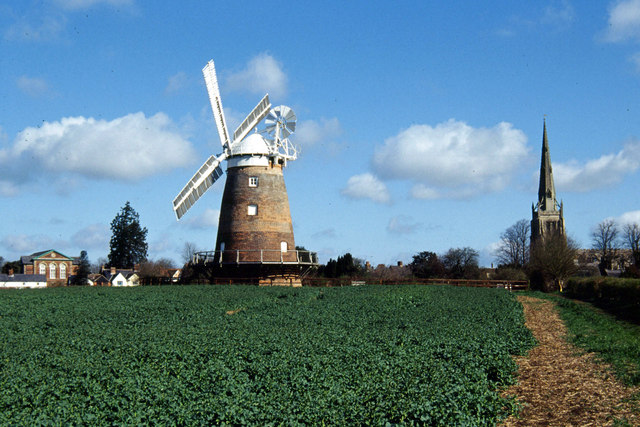
Thaxted, Essex, scene of the Whitsun music festivals 1916–18

Joseph increased her teaching commitments by often deputising for Holst, both at James Allen's and at SPGS. She also continued in her role of the composer's amanuensis, and was invited to attend the private premiere of The Planets, on 29 September 1918 at the Queen's Hall, where Adrian Boult conducted the Queen's Hall orchestra. She later wrote: "From the moment of Mars ... to the last sound of Neptune, it was a big thing that will last all our lives, I think". She was able to draw on her classical education at Girton when she helped to translate the apocryphal work The Acts of John from the original Greek, to provide the text for Holst's Hymn of Jesus (1917); for the same work she prepared a vocal score and an arrangement for piano, strings and organ. She and Holst combined to produce a women's voices version (two sopranos and an alto) of William Byrd's Mass for Three Voices, and Joseph worked alone to produce an orchestral accompaniment for Samuel Wesley's Sing Aloud with Gladness. This latter work was prepared for the 1917 Whitsun musical festival, one of an annual series of such festivals that Holst masterminded, first at his home town of Thaxted, in later years at assorted venues including Dulwich, Chichester and Canterbury. Joseph became a key figure in these festivals, as organiser, performer and composer. At Thaxted in 1918 two of her compositions were performed: Hymn for female voices (now lost), and an orchestral piece, Barbara Noel's Morris, which Joseph wrote to mark her friendship with the daughter of Conrad Noel, Thaxted's vicar.

The years 1917 and 1918 also brought personal sadness. On 22 October 1917 Joseph's father died from a heart attack. On 27 May the following year, just after the Whitsun festival, her brother William was killed in action on the western front; in September, Edwin was severely wounded in the final Allied offensive of the war. In his monograph on Joseph's life and music, the composer Alan Gibbs writes that "there is no hint in Jane's letters of the effect these events had on her". Gibbs quotes Duff Cooper, who wrote of those times: "... if we wept—as weep we did—we wept in secret".

=== Teacher, facilitator and composer, 1918–1928 ===
==== Postwar years ====
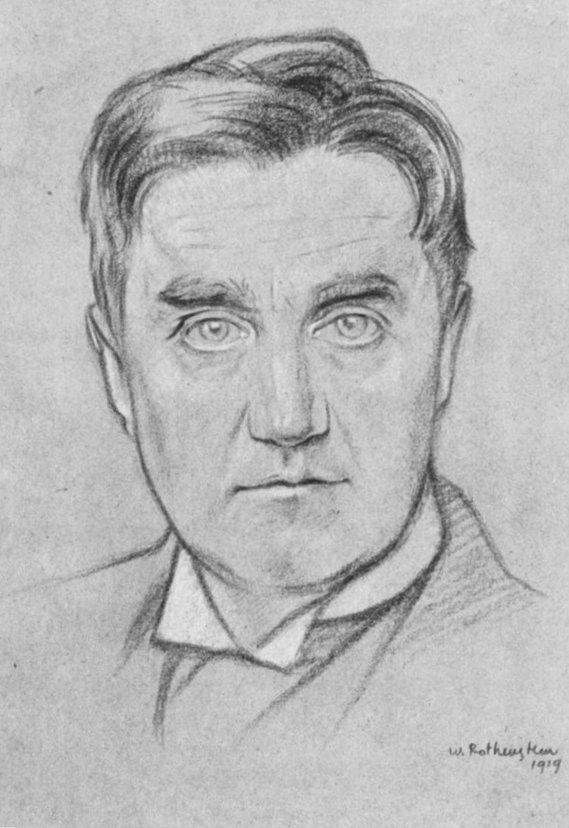
Ralph Vaughan Williams, an appreciative critic of Joseph's early compositions

In 1919, seeking to consolidate her musical career, Joseph joined the Society of Women Musicians (SWM), founded in 1911 by the violinist and musicologist Marion Scott and others to promote the interests of women in music. Scott was known to Joseph, having been leader of the Morley orchestra. Joseph became a member of the SWM's Composers' Sectional Committee, and occasionally gave lectures to the society on subjects such as "The Necessity of Practical Experience for Composers", and "The Composer as Pupil". In the summer of 1919 she took conducting lessons from Adrian Boult, whom she described as "the most chinless man I have ever met". The purpose of the lessons was to enable her to conduct her orchestral work Bergamask, which was performed at the Coliseum Theatre under a scheme devised by Sir Oswald Stoll to showcase new British music. In that same summer she met Ralph Vaughan Williams, a close friend of Holst. She played him some of her music, probably a piano reduction of Bergamask, and described him as "a very appreciative critic".

Towards the end of 1918 Holst had asked Joseph to provide a libretto for his opera The Perfect Fool, feeling that she might possess the required light touch that he thought his own writing lacked. It is not clear whether she declined, or whether Holst changed his mind, but he eventually wrote the text himself. Joseph did, however, write the story for a ballet based on Holst's music The Sneezing Charm; the ballet, entitled A Magic Hour, was performed at Morley in October 1920. Meantime, Joseph's works were being performed at SWM concerts: two songs, probably from her Mirage cycle, in January 1920, and some of her settings of Walter de la Mare poems in December.

At Eothen, Joseph continued to supervise Imogen Holst's musical education, aspects of which had earlier been causing Holst some concern. In a letter to his wife dated February 1919, written when he was serving as YMCA musical organiser for British troops stationed in the Eastern Mediterranean, Holst reported that "I've had a very kind and wise letter from Jane about Imogen". Whatever issues had troubled Holst were resolved satisfactorily, and Joseph became Imogen's theory teacher: "Theory with Jane is ripping", the young pupil enthused. In the summer term of 1920, with help from Joseph, Imogen devised and composed a "Dance of Nymphs and Shepherds" which was performed at the school on 9 July. At the beginning of 1921 Imogen started at SPGS; before becoming a boarder at Bute House (one of the school's residences for pupils), she stayed in the Joseph family home.

The Whitsun festivals, suspended during Holst's absence, resumed at Dulwich in 1920. Joseph's part in this event is unrecorded, but she made a major contribution to the following year's festivities, which began beside the Thames at Isleworth and concluded on Whit Monday at SPGS in the gardens of Bute House. For the Monday's celebrations Joseph devised a presentation of Purcell's semi-opera from 1690, Dioclesian. Writing of the occasion after Joseph's death, Holst recalled that she had woven Purcell's music and Thomas Betterton's text, both long neglected, "into a delightful out-door pageant founded on a fairy story, complete with lost princess, dragon and princely hero". Not satisfied with planning every aspect of the outdoor performance, Joseph prepared an indoors version of the entertainment, should the weather require this. The production was a great success, and was repeated that summer in Hyde Park and, in October 1921, at the Old Vic theatre. Throughout this considerable organisational task, Holst wrote, "Jane gave the minimum of worry to each person concerned by giving herself the maximum of hard work and forethought".

==== Career zenith ====
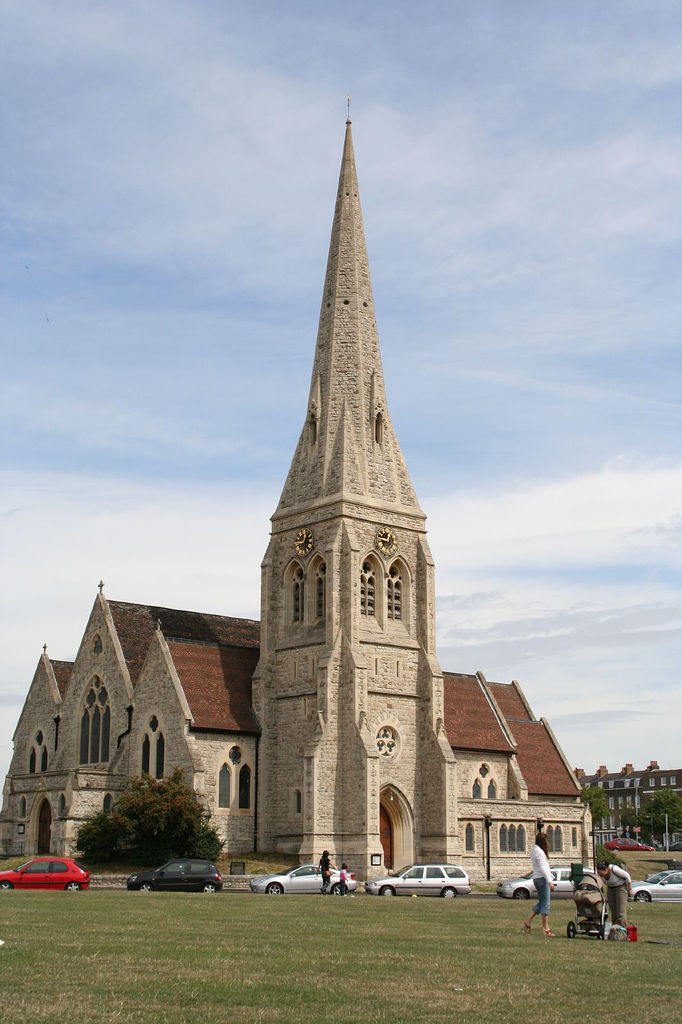
All Saints, Blackheath, venue for the 1922 Whitsun festival (2007 photograph)

In November 1921 Joseph organised the Morley forces to perform a large-scale pageant, celebrating the bicentenary of the church of St Martin-in-the-Fields. The text was by Laurence Housman and the music, directed by Holst, was taken from the Morley repertory. In the following year Joseph's increasing recognition as a composer was confirmed when her Seven Two-Part Songs were performed at a SWM concert that included works by Ethel Smyth and other women composers. Two of Joseph's works, A Hymn for Whitsuntide and A Festival Venite were introduced during the 1922 Whitsun festival at All Saints' church, Blackheath, with Holst conducting. After the Venite premiere Joseph wrote appreciatively to Holst: "Do you suppose for one moment that any other conductor takes trouble like that? If you do, you are quite wrong". The Venite was performed on 13 June 1923 at the Queen's Hall, by the Philharmonic Choir under Charles Kennedy Scott; the Spectator's critic thought it a "very notable addition to modern British music". Amidst her compositional and other activities, Joseph found time, in 1922, to organise the first Kensington Musical Competition Festival, and to orchestrate many of the competition songs. In due course this festival became an important annual event in Kensington; Vaughan Williams was among the adjudicators. On 12 October 1922, Vaughan Williams's 50th birthday, Joseph organised a choir which gave an early-morning surprise performance in the composer's garden of a song she had written to mark the occasion.

As early as 1919, Joseph had written to her brother Edwin expressing concern about Holst's health. When following a physical breakdown in 1923 Holst gave up his duties at Morley College, Joseph wrote him a supportive letter congratulating him on his decision which would enable him to concentrate on composition. The following years were particularly fruitful for Holst, and Joseph assisted in many of the works he produced in the 1924–28 period. She helped him prepare the score for his Choral Symphony, for which assistance he presented her with his original draft sketches, as a gesture of gratitude. Together with Lasker and Day she worked to prepare vocal and full scores for the opera At the Boar's Head, and attended the rehearsals in March 1925. After the opera's premiere on 3 April she wrote to Holst with mildly critical comments on some of the singers, though with praise for the conductor, the young Malcolm Sargent. When Holst composed a short choral piece to celebrate the 21st birthday of the Oriana Madrigal Society, Joseph provided words which humorously reflected the conductor Kennedy Scott's working methods; the work was greatly appreciated by the choir. In that same year, 1925, she helped to found the Kensington Choral Society. By this time the Joseph home in Kensington, where Jane lived for her whole life, was becoming a recognised musical gathering-place; a visitor recalled meeting Vaughan Williams, Boult, and the harpist Sidonie Goossens there, among others.

In 1926 Joseph provided Holst with the libretto for his choral ballet The Golden Goose, based on a story by the Brothers Grimm, and arranged its first performance at the 1926 Whitsun festival, held at the James Allen school. Joseph also assisted Holst and the librettist Steuart Wilson in the production of a second choral ballet, The Morning of the Year—the first work commissioned by the BBC's newly formed music department—which was performed at the Royal Albert Hall in March 1927. The Morley College Annual Report of 1927 recorded the formation of a folk dance club, and noted Joseph's "skilful direction" of the group. Her increasing interest in dance led her, that year, to join the English Folk Dance Society and the Kensington Dance Club.

=== Illness, death and tributes ===
The main feature of the 1928 Whitsun festival, held at Canterbury, was a religious drama, The Coming of Christ, commissioned by George Bell, then Dean of Canterbury, and written by John Masefield. Holst provided the incidental music. In a photograph described by Gibbs, taken of the festival's organisers and performers, Joseph is sitting between Holst and Mrs Bell, "taller than either, an efficient-looking lady in her early thirties, clearly of some importance to the festival". This was Joseph's last Whitsun. Towards the end of the year her health began to fail; there is a mention in Holst's diary for 29 November 1928, "Jane's concert 8.15", but no indication is given of whether she was a performer. In February 1929 she paid off the final amount owing to the piano manufacturer C. Bechstein, for Morley's new piano for which she had been fundraising since 1926. On 9 March 1929 Joseph died at home, in Kensington, of kidney failure. After a private funeral she was buried in Willesden Jewish Cemetery.

Holst was in Venice when the news of Joseph's death reached him; although Imogen records that he received it stoically, he was privately devastated. Joseph had, wrote Imogen, "come nearest to his ideal of clear thinking and clear feeling". In his own tribute, Holst drew attention to Joseph's "infinite capacity for taking pains which amounts to genius". No Whitsun festival was held in 1929, but in early July, at an open-air production of Holst's The Golden Goose at Warwick Castle, a special performance of his St Paul's Suite was played in Joseph's memory. On 5 December 1929, at a competitive music festival, Vaughan Williams conducted the choir in Joseph's Hymn for Whitsuntide while the audience stood in tribute. The same hymn was played at the first resumed Whitsun festival, at Chichester in May 1930. In July 1931 Holst included her music in a concert that he conducted at Chichester Cathedral, alongside works by William Byrd, Thomas Weelkes and Vaughan Williams. Over the course of the next few years Joseph's works were played at concerts and events organised by Morley College, the SWM, SPGS and the English Folk Dance Society. At Eothen a "Jane Joseph Memorial Prize" was established, and music scholarships were endowed in her name at Eothen and SPGS.

A friend who expressed personal sadness on hearing of Joseph's death revealed another aspect of her character: "England won't be the same without Jane. She was terribly difficult to get to know at all, and awfully lonely, I thought, in spite of all her friends—don't you think so?—but I can't imagine Music without her".

== Music ==
Much of Joseph's music was written for performances at modest-scale events by amateur performers. As such it was never published, and over the years many works have been lost. The published works and the few others that survive, Gibbs believes, place Joseph in the category of "progressive" English composers. Although her first few compositions were mainly songs, she demonstrated early abilities as an orchestral composer. Gibbs finds in her two short pieces, Morris Dance (1917) (originally Barbara Noel's Morris) and Bergamask (1919), three and five minutes respectively, a "fine feeling for orchestral sound". The Morris Dance has added sparkle from a glockenspiel, while Bergamask has a festive Italianate feel. The music writer Philip Scowcroft praises Joseph's confident handling of the sizeable orchestral forces required for the Morris Dance, while the composer Havergal Brian, Holst's contemporary, found Bergamask "exhilarating" and "full of promise". Gibbs suggests that these two works presage Holst's late choral ballets, and comments: "That these carefree pieces did not find a permanent place in the repertory is unfortunate".

Miss Joseph's 'Venite' is written in a great tradition ... however much the 'Venite' owes in spirit to the Tudor composers, it is an individual and self-supporting growth from that great tree, and its roots draw energy and life from fresh, unvitiated ground."

— From The Spectator review of the Queen's Hall performance of Joseph's Venite, June 1923

In Joseph's Mirage song cycle of 1921 (five songs with string quartet accompaniment), a Holstian influence is evident alongside her own distinctive compositional voice. Gibbs highlights the first in the cycle, "Song", which initially echoes "To Varuna" from Holst's Rig Veda hymns, but evolves into "a different creation, distinguished by its own uncluttered quartet writing in which the viola has a special part to play". The final song, "Echo", has as much in common with Brahms as with Holst. Joseph's Festival Venite from 1922 is an example of her use of the Modern Dorian mode (an ascending scale from D to the next D on the white piano keys), which became a feature of some of her later works. Scowcroft and Gibbs both point to Tudor influences in the Venite in which also, says Gibbs, "the congenial influence of Vaughan Williams in melody and harmony is felt". The orchestral score for this work lost, but an organ accompaniment has been devised. Joseph's unaccompanied choral Hymn for Whitsuntide also uses the Dorian Mode in what Holst described as a "flawless little motet"; this was first work of Joseph's to be broadcast, in 1968. A Short String Quartet in A minor was performed by the Winifred Smith Quartet in December 1922 and was accepted for publication by J.B. Cramer and Co. However, it was not published, and subsequently disappeared.

Joseph's carol "A Little Childe There is Ibore", is a setting of a 15th-century poem for three female voices and piano or strings. Holst considered this "the best of Jane's many carols, and perhaps the hardest to perform well." Written in alternate bars of five and seven beats, it was praised by Brian for its originality. It was eventually broadcast by the BBC on 21 December 1995. Brian was also an admirer of Joseph's many instructional piano pieces: "pleasingly simple and unaffected". These were published between 1920 and 1925; Gibbs writes that these pieces "focus on technical aspects in tuneful and often modal contexts", with occasional excursions into other forms such as chaconne and rondo.

== Notes and references ==
=== Bibliography ===
- Cooper, Duff (1955). Old Men Forget. London: Rupert Hart-Davis. OCLC 500267933.
- Dickinson, Alan Edgar Frederic (1995). Alan Gibbs (ed.). Holst's Music—A Guide. London: Thames. ISBN 0-905210-45-X.
- Gibbs, Alan (July 1999). "The Music of Jane Joseph". Tempo (299): 14–18. doi:10.1017/S0040298200014637. JSTOR 946669. (subscription required)
- Gibbs, Alan (2000). "Chapter II: Jane Joseph". Holst Among Friends. London: Thames Publishing. ISBN 978-0-905210-59-9.
- Grogan, Christopher, ed. (2010). Imogen Holst: A Life in Music. Woodbridge, Suffolk: The Boydell Press. ISBN 978-1-84383-599-8.
- Holst, Gustav (1931). "Jane Joseph: An Appreciation". Monthly Musical Record, 1 April 1931, p98. Reprinted on the website British Classical Music: The Land of Lost Content
- Holst, Imogen (1981). The Great Composers: Holst (second ed.). London: Faber and Faber. ISBN 0-571-09967-X.
- Short, Michael (1990). Gustav Holst: The Man and his Music. Oxford: Oxford University Press. ISBN 0-19-314154-X.
