= Alkestis =

Alkestis nevermanni

Scientific classification
- Kingdom: Animalia
- Phylum: Arthropoda
- Class: Insecta
- Order: Coleoptera
- Suborder: Adephaga
- Family: Carabidae
- Subfamily: Lebiinae
- Genus: Alkestis; Liebke, 1939
- Species: A. nevermanni

Binomial name
- Alkestis nevermanni Liebke, 1939

Genus of beetles

Alkestis nevermanni is a species of beetle in the family Carabidae, the only species in the genus Alkestis.
