= The Perfect Fool =

Opera by Gustav Holst

- Opera by Gustav Holst
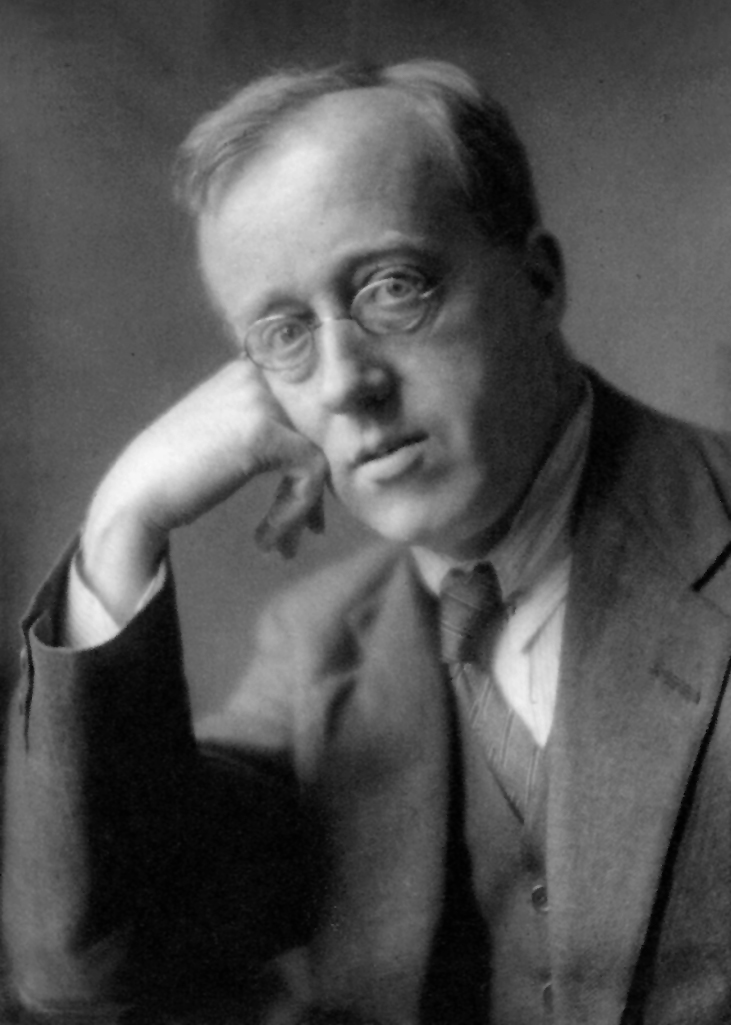
- Holst, circa 1921
- Librettist: Gustav Holst
- Premiere: 14 May 1923; Covent Garden Theatre, London, England

The Perfect Fool is a comic opera in one act with music and libretto by the English composer Gustav Holst. Holst composed the work over the period of 1918 to 1922. The opera received its premiere at the Covent Garden Theatre, London, on 14 May 1923. Holst had originally asked Clifford Bax to write the libretto, but Bax declined.

In the score, Holst pokes fun at the works of Verdi, Wagner's Parsifal and Debussy. In the opera, the part of the Fool consists of no singing and only one spoken word, "no." One interpretation of the possible symbolism of the opera, from Donald Tovey, is that the Princess symbolizes the world of opera and the Fool represents the British public.

The opera was not a success, and audiences found the story confusing. Although the opera did receive a live BBC broadcast a year after its premiere, performed by the British National Opera Company and relayed from His Majesty's Theatre, London, revivals of the work have been rare. In 1995, Vernon Handley conducted a performance of the complete opera for the BBC, broadcast on 25 December.

== Ballet music ==
"Dance to the Spirits of Fire"
Performed by the Stellar Brass of the United States Air Force Academy Band, 2007

The introductory ballet music is much more often performed, separately as a suite. The ballet music falls into the following sections:

- Andante (invocation)
- Dance of Spirits of Earth (Moderato – Andante)
- Dance of Spirits of Water (Allegro)
- Dance of Spirits of Fire (Allegro moderato – Andante)

Themes from the ballet music recur throughout the remainder of the opera.

== Roles ==
Roles, voice types, premiere cast
Role	Voice type	Premiere cast, 14 May 1923 Conductor: Eugene Goossens
Fool/Farmer	spoken role	Raymond Ellis
Wizard	baritone	Robert Parker
Troubadour	tenor	Walter Hyde
Traveller	bass	Frederick Collier
Princess	soprano	Maggie Teyte
Fool's mother	contralto	Edna Thornton

== Instrumentation ==
- Woodwind: piccolo, 2 flutes, 2 oboes, English horn, 2 clarinets, bass clarinet, 2 bassoons, and a contrabassoon
- Brass: 4 horns in F, 4 trumpets in C, 3 trombones (2 tenor and 1 bass), and a tuba
- Keyboards: a celesta
- Percussion: 3 timpani, a bass drum, cymbals (suspended and clash), a tam-tam, sleigh bells, a tambourine, and a xylophone.
- Strings: a harp, 1st and 2nd violins, violas, violoncellos, and double basses
