= Imogen Holst =

English composer and conductor (1907–1984)

Imogen Holst CBE
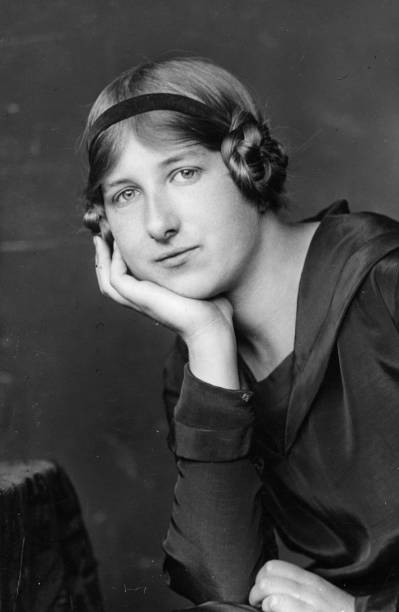
- Born: 12 April 1907; Richmond, Surrey, England
- Died: 9 March 1984 (aged 76); Aldeburgh, Suffolk, England
- Occupations: Composer, arranger, conductor, teacher, musicologist, festival administrator
- Father: Gustav Holst

Imogen Clare Holst CBE (née von Holst; 12 April 1907 – 9 March 1984) was a British composer, arranger, conductor, teacher, musicologist and festival administrator. The only child of the composer Gustav Holst, she is particularly known for her educational work at Dartington Hall in the 1940s, and for her 20 years as joint artistic director of the Aldeburgh Festival. In addition to composing music, she wrote composer biographies, much educational material and several books on the life and works of her father.

From a young age Holst showed precocious talent in composing and performance. After attending Eothen School and St Paul's Girls' School, she entered the Royal College of Music, where she developed her skills as a conductor and won several prizes for composing. Unable to follow her initial ambitions to be a pianist or a dancer for health reasons, Holst spent most of the 1930s teaching, and as a full-time organiser for the English Folk Dance and Song Society. These duties reduced her compositional activities, although she made many arrangements of folksongs. After serving as an organiser for the Council for the Encouragement of Music and the Arts at the start of the Second World War, in 1942 she began working at Dartington. In her nine years there she established Dartington as a major centre of music education and activity.

In the early 1950s Holst became Benjamin Britten's musical assistant, moved to Aldeburgh, and began helping with the organisation of the annual Aldeburgh Festival. In 1956 she became joint artistic director of the festival, and during the following 20 years helped it to a position of pre-eminence in British musical life. In 1964 she gave up her work as Britten's assistant to resume her own compositional career and to concentrate on the preservation of her father's musical legacy. Her own music is not widely known and has received little critical attention; much of it is unpublished and unperformed. The first recordings dedicated to her works, issued in 2009 and 2012, were warmly received by critics. She was appointed CBE in 1975 and received numerous academic honours. She died at Aldeburgh and is buried in the churchyard there.

== Background ==
=== Early life and family ===
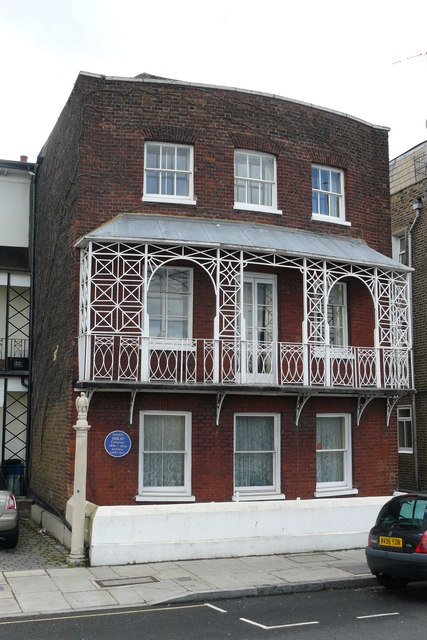
The house in Barnes where the Holst family lived between 1908 and 1913

Imogen Holst was born on 12 April 1907 at 31 Grena Road, Richmond, a riverside town to the west of London. Her parents were Gustav Theodore Holst, an aspiring composer then working as a music teacher, and Isobel, née Harrison. The Holst family, of mixed Swedish, German and Latvian ancestry, had been in England since 1802 and had been musicians for several generations. (Note: The family's name was "von Holst" until Gustav changed it in 1918, during the First World War.) Gustav followed this family tradition; while studying at the Royal College of Music (RCM), he met Isobel Harrison, who sang in one of the amateur choirs that he conducted. He was immediately attracted to her, and they were married on 22 July 1901.

While attempting to establish himself as a composer, Gustav Holst worked first as an orchestral trombonist, and later as a teacher. In 1907 he held teaching posts at James Allen's Girls' School in Dulwich, and St Paul's Girls' School (SPGS) in Hammersmith, where he was director of music. From 1907 he acted as director of music at Morley College, an adult education centre in the Waterloo district of London. When Imogen was still very small the family moved from Richmond to a small house by the river in nearby Barnes, which they rented from a relative. Imogen's main memories of this house were of her father working in his composing room on the top floor, which she was forbidden to visit, and of his efforts to teach her folk-songs.

=== Schooling ===
Gustav Holst circa 1920, drawn by William Rothenstein

Descriptions of Imogen as a small child indicate that she had blue eyes, fair hair, an oval face reminiscent of her father's, and a prominent nose inherited from her mother. In 1912, at the age of five, she joined the kindergarten class at the Froebel Institute, and remained at the school for five years. Summers were often spent at the Holsts' rented country cottage at Thaxted in Essex, where Gustav Holst began an annual Whitsun Festival in 1916.

In 1917 Imogen began boarding at Eothen, a small, private school for girls in Caterham which later merged to form Caterham School. It was there that Jane Joseph, Gustav's star pupil from SPGS, taught music. A letter home, dated 17 July 1917, tells of "compertishions [sic], and ripping prizes, and strawberries and cream for tea". At the school, Imogen studied piano with Eleanor Shuttleworth, violin with André Mangeot (described as "topping") and theory with Jane Joseph ("ripping"). Under Joseph's tuition Imogen produced her first compositions—two instrumental pieces and four Christmas carol tunes—which she numbered as Ops. 1, 2, and 3. In the summer term of 1920, she composed and choreographed a "Dance of the Nymphs and Shepherds", which was performed at the school under her direction on 9 July. (Note: The "Nymphs and Shepherds" dance music was Imogen's Op. 4, originally titled The Masque of the Tempest.)

Imogen left Eothen in December 1920 hoping to study under Ruby Ginner at the Ginner-Mawer School of Dance and Drama, (Note: Ruby Ginner (1886–1978) was an expert on Ancient Greek dance. She founded the Association of Teachers of the Revived Greek Dance in 1923.) but was rejected on health grounds, although there appeared to be no significant medical issue. She then studied at home under a governess, while waiting to start at St Paul's Girls School in the autumn. At Whitsun 1921 she took part as a dancer in her father's production of Purcell's semi-opera from 1690, Masque of Dioclesian, held in the St Paul's School grounds and repeated a week later in Hyde Park.

In September 1921 Imogen began at St Paul's Girls School, and became a boarder from Spring 1922. In July 1922 she performed a Bach Prelude and Fugue on the piano, for which Joseph praised her warmly, writing: "I think everyone enjoyed the Bach from beginning to end, they all made nice contented noises at the end of it". Imogen's SPGS years were generally happy and successful. In July 1923 she won the junior Alice Lupton piano prize, but her chances of distinction as a pianist were marred when she began to develop phlebitis in her left arm. (Note: In an obituary tribute, Ursula Vaughan Williams refers to Imogen's arm condition as "inherited from Gustav". In fact, Gustav Holst suffered from neuritis in his right arm, an equally disabling but unrelated condition.) Among other activities she became interested in folk music and dance, and in 1923 became a member of the English Folk Dance Society (EFDS). In 1924–25, her final year at SPGS, Imogen founded a folk dance society in the school. At an end-of-term school concert late in July 1925, she played Chopin's étude in E major and gave the first performance of Gustav Holst's Toccata.

==== Royal College of Music ====
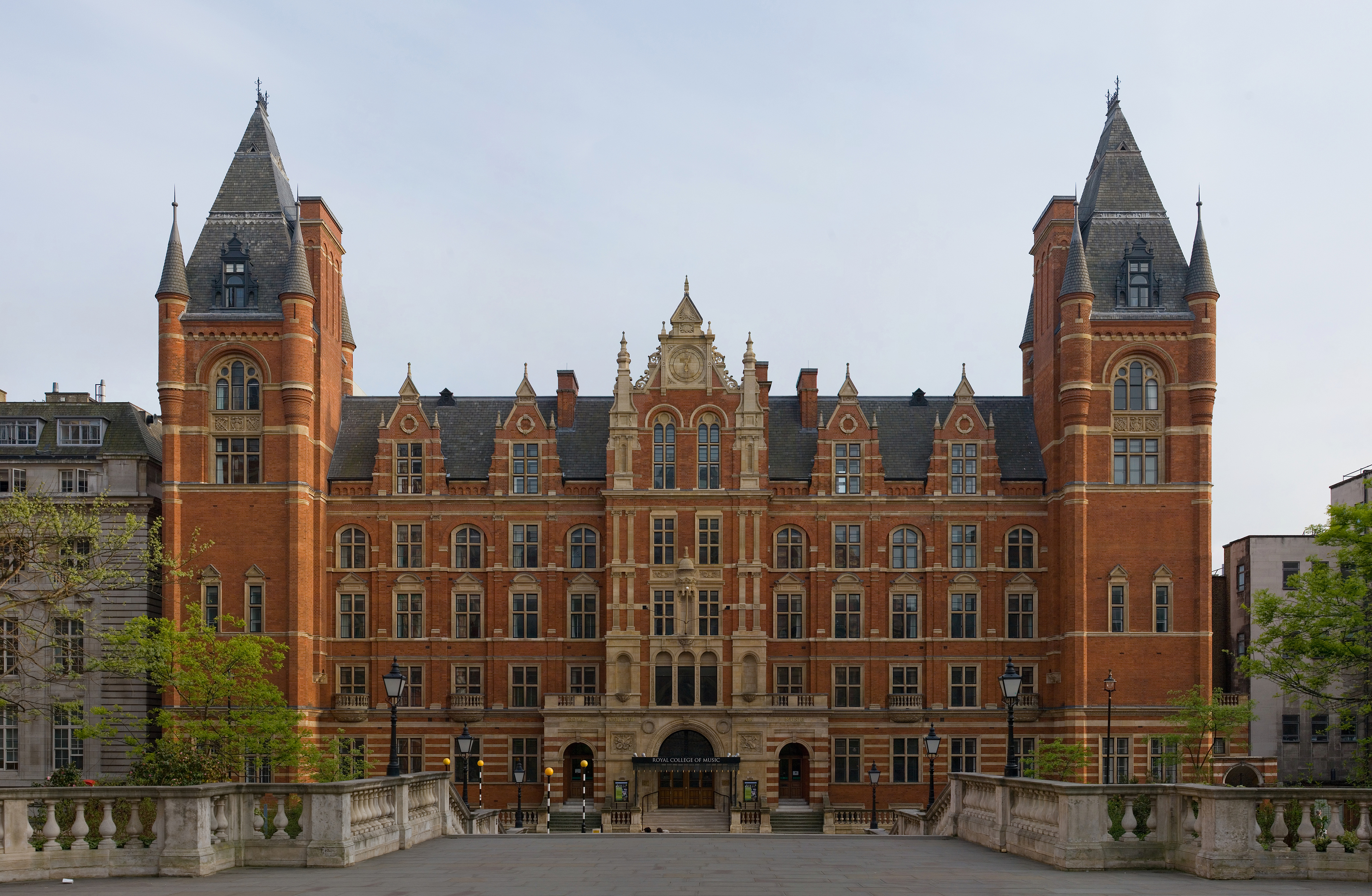
Royal College of Music

Although destined like her father for the RCM, Holst first spent a year studying composition with Herbert Howells, piano with Adine O'Neill and the French horn with Adolph Borsdorf, while participating in the EFDS summer schools and other musical activities. In July 1926 she arranged and conducted the music for an EFDS pageant, held at Thaxted as a fund-raiser towards the building of the society's new headquarters at Regent's Park. Holst began at the RCM in September 1926, studying piano with Kathleen Long, composition with George Dyson, and conducting under W. H. Reed. Her aptitude as a conductor was evident in December 1926, when she led the college's Third Orchestra in the opening movement of Mozart's "Prague" Symphony. This and other performances on the podium led The Daily Telegraph to speculate that Holst might eventually become the first woman to "establish a secure tenure of the conductor's platform".

In her second RCM year Holst concentrated on composition, producing several chamber works including a violin sonata, an oboe quintet, and a suite for woodwind. She took her first steps towards personal independence when she moved from the family home to a bedsit near Kensington Gardens. In 1928 she went to Belgium with the EFDS, took an Italian holiday, and made an extended trip to Germany with a group known as "The Travelling Morrice" which promoted international understanding through music and dance. In October 1928 she won the RCM's Cobbett prize for an original chamber composition, her Phantasy String Quartet, and shortly afterwards was awarded the Morley Scholarship for the "best all-round student". The quartet was broadcast by the BBC on 20 March 1929, but for her, the achievement was overshadowed by the news that month of the premature death at 34 of her early mentor Jane Joseph.

In the winter of 1929 Holst made her first visit to Canada and the United States, as part of an EFDS party. Back home, she worked on her RCM finals composition, a suite for brass band entitled The Unfortunate Traveller. Despite some apprehension on her part, the piece passed the examiners' scrutiny and was played at the college's end-of-year concert in July 1930. (Note: In 1969, after Isobel Holst's death, Imogen found the manuscript of The Unfortunate Traveller among her mother's possessions. To her, the work symbolised what she perceived to be her failure as a composer, and she insisted that the manuscript be burnt.) Before then, in June, Holst learned that she had been awarded an Octavia Travelling Scholarship worth £100, which would enable her to study composition abroad.

== Career ==
=== European travels, 1930–31 ===
Holst spent much of the period between September 1930 and May 1931 travelling. A hectic visit to Liège in September, for the International Society of Contemporary Music Congress, was followed immediately by a three-month round trip, to Scandinavia, Germany, Austria and Hungary, returning to England via Prague, Dresden, Leipzig, Berlin and Amsterdam. Her musical experiences included a Mozart pilgrimage in Salzburg, performances of Der Rosenkavalier and Die Entführung aus dem Serail at the Vienna State Opera, Bach in Berlin and Mahler's Seventh Symphony in Amsterdam. On 1 February 1932 she left England again, this time for Italy. After a two-month tour Holst came home with mixed views on Italian music-making. She concluded that "the Italians are a nation of singers ... But music is a different language in that part of the world". Back in London, she decided that despite her experiences, "if it is music one is wanting, there is no place like London."

=== Mainly teaching, 1931–38 ===
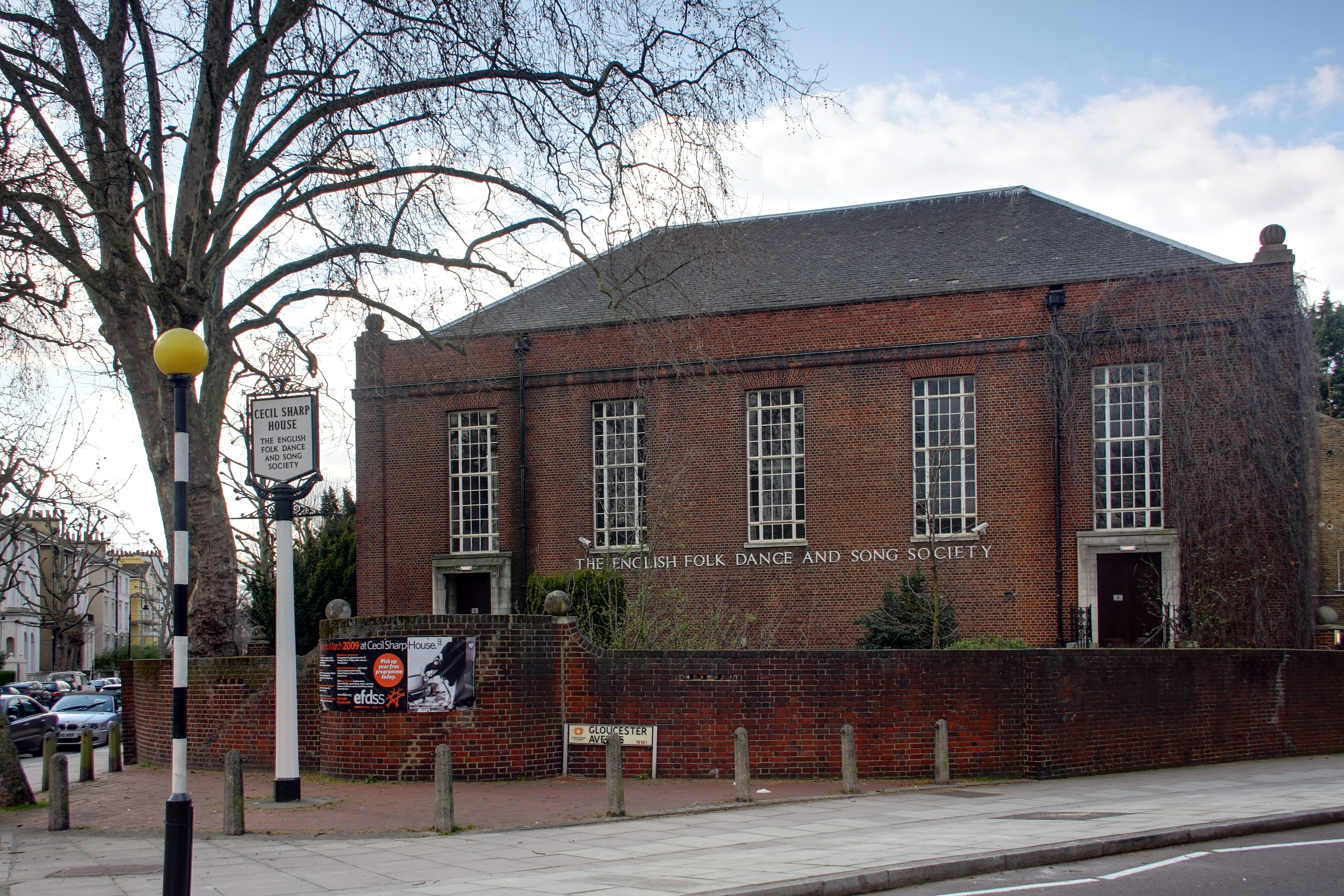
Cecil Sharp House, London headquarters of the English Folk Dance and Song Society

With her scholarship funds exhausted, Holst needed a job, and in June 1931 took charge of music at the Citizen House arts and education centre in Bath. She disliked the disciplines imposed by an unsympathetic and unyielding superior, but stayed until the end of the year, by which time Citizen House had relocated to Hampstead. She worked briefly as a freelance conductor and accompanist before joining the staff of the EFDS early in 1932. The organisation had by now expanded to become the "English Folk Dance and Song Society" (EFDSS) and was based in new headquarters at Cecil Sharp House. (Note: The EFDSS was established in March 1932, after the English Folk Dance Society for which Holst had worked voluntarily for many years had agreed to merge with the English Folk Song Society.) The duties, mainly teaching, were not full-time, and she was able to take up part-time teaching posts at her old school, Eothen, and at Roedean School. Although she composed little original music during these years, she made many instrumental and vocal arrangements of traditional folk melodies.

Gustav Holst's health had been poor for years; in the winter of 1933–34 it deteriorated, and he died on 25 May 1934. Imogen Holst privately determined that she would establish and protect her father's musical legacy. On 24 March 1935 she took part in a Gustav Holst memorial concert, in which she conducted her own arrangement of one of her father's brass band suites. Meanwhile, her own music was beginning to attract attention. Her carol arrangement "Nowell and Nowell" was performed in a 1934 Christmas concert in Chichester Cathedral, and the following year saw the premiere of her Concerto for Violin and Strings, with Elsie Avril as the soloist. In 1936 she paid a visit to Hollywood, where she stayed with her uncle (Gustav's brother), the actor Ernest Cossart. Back in England, Holst worked on recorder arrangements of music by the neglected 17th-century composer Pelham Humphrey. These were published in 1936 to a positive critical reception.

In 1938 Holst published a biography of her father. Among many positive comments from friends and critics, the composer Edmund Rubbra praised her for producing a book that was not "clouded by sentiment ... her biography is at once intimate and objective".

=== War: travelling for CEMA ===
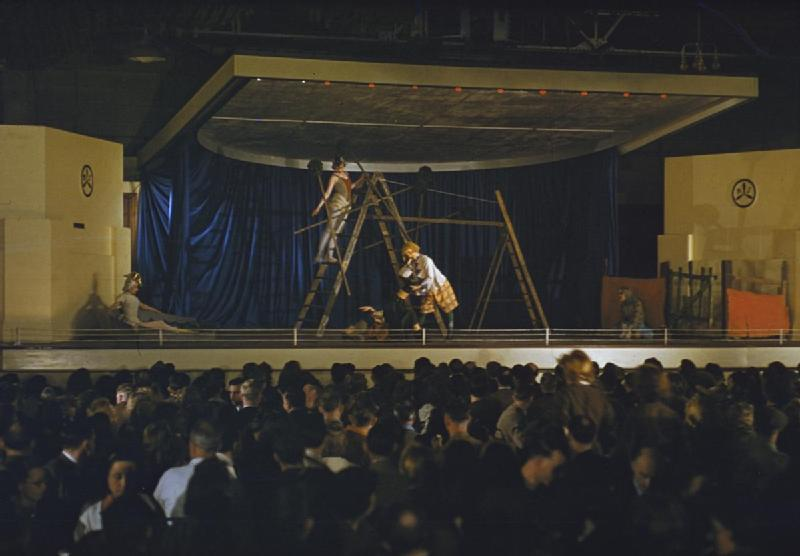
A CEMA concert during the Second World War (a performance of Prokofiev's Peter and the Wolf by the Ballet Rambert)

In 1938 Holst decided to abandon amateur music-making and teaching to concentrate on her own professional development. She resigned her EFDSS post while continuing to honour existing commitments to the organisation. She had given up her work at Roedean in 1936; at Easter 1939 she resigned from Eothen. In June 1939 she began a tour of Switzerland which included the Lucerne Festival. Towards the end of August, as war became increasingly likely, she broke off the trip and returned home.

After the outbreak of war on 3 September 1939, Holst worked for the Bloomsbury House Refugee Committee, which supported German and Austrian refugee musicians interned under emergency regulations. In January 1940 she accepted a position under a scheme organised by the Pilgrim Trust, to act as one of six "music travellers", whose brief was to boost morale by encouraging musical activities in rural communities. Holst was assigned to cover the west of England, a huge area stretching from Oxfordshire to Cornwall. When the government set up the Council for the Encouragement of Music and the Arts (CEMA), responsibility for the music travellers passed to that body. (Note: CEMA was created by a Royal Charter in 1940. In 1946 it evolved into the Arts Council of Great Britain, under a new charter.)

With little practical support from CEMA, Holst's organisational talents, according to her friend Ursula Vaughan Williams, "developed brilliantly". According to Holst's own account, her duties included conducting local brass bands and Women's Institute choirs ("fourteen very old women in hats sitting round the edge of a dark, empty hideous tin hut"), and organising sing-songs for evacuee children. She arranged performances by professional groups, and what she termed "drop-in-and-sing" festivals in which anyone could join. She wrote of "idyllic days" spent over cups of tea, discussing the hopes and dreams of would-be music makers. Her compositional activity in these years was limited by time and pressures of work, but she produced two recorder trios—the Offley and Deddington suites—and made numerous arrangements for female voices of carols and traditional songs.

=== Dartington ===
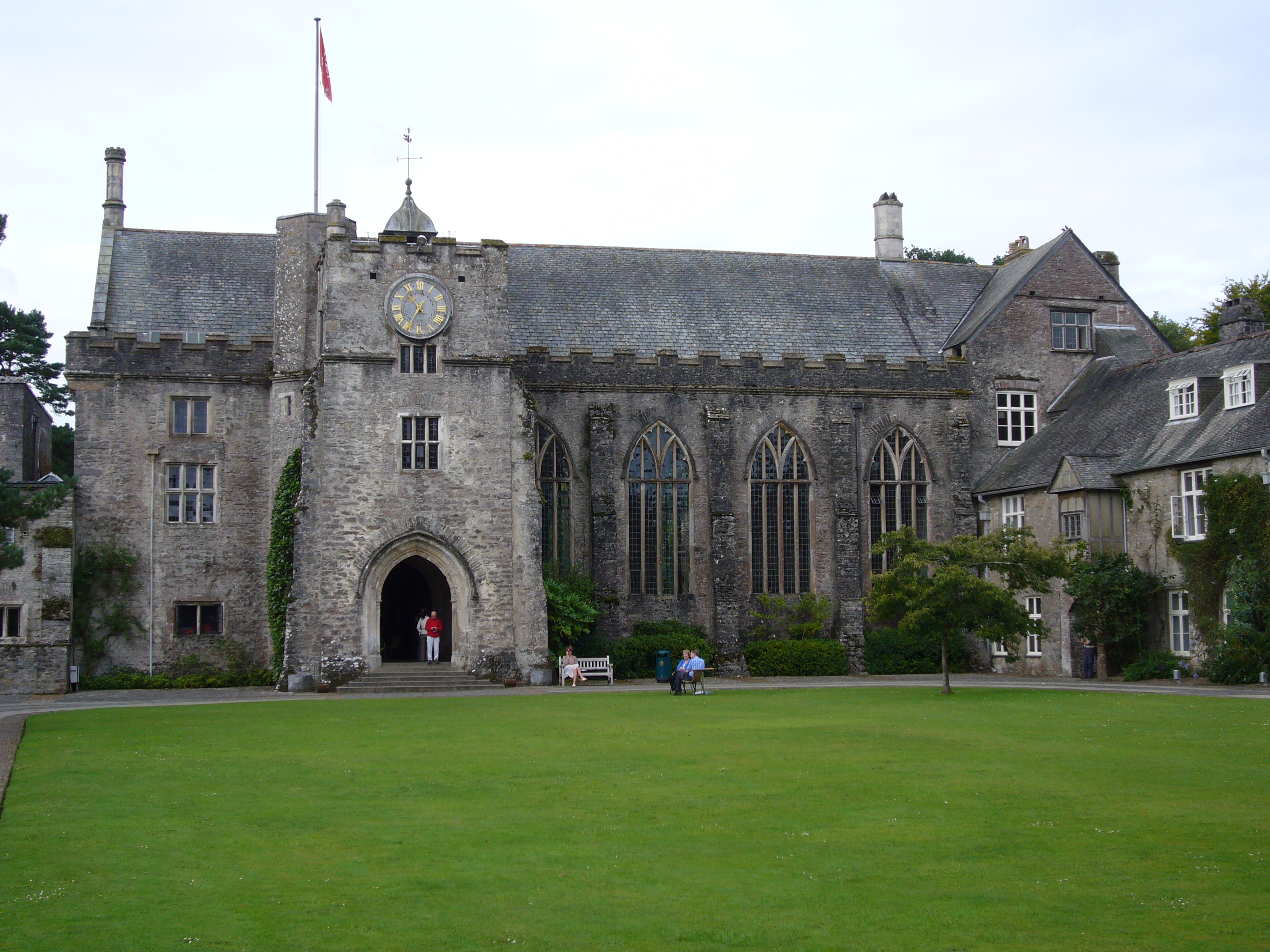
The main hall at Dartington

In 1938 Holst had visited Dartington Hall, a progressive school and crafts community near Totnes in Devon, which had been founded in 1925 by Leonard and Dorothy Elmhirst. In 1941–42, while travelling for CEMA in Devon and Cornwall, she was invited by the Elmhirsts to make her base at Dartington. In the summer of 1942 she was persuaded by Christopher Martin, the centre's administrator, to resign her CEMA role and work at Dartington. He had in mind a music course, "the sort of thing that your father did in the old days at Morley College". Beginning in 1943, Holst established a one-year course, initially designed to train young women to organise amateur orchestras and musical events in rural communities. Gradually it developed into a more general musical education for a broader student intake. Under Holst's leadership the course quickly became the hub of a range of musical activities, including the foundation of an amateur orchestra: "Hardly any of us could play ... However bad we were, we went on". Holst's teaching methods, heavily based on "learning by doing" and without formal examinations, at first disconcerted her students and puzzled the school inspectors, but eventually gained acceptance and respect. Rosamond Strode, a pupil at Dartington who later worked with Holst at Aldeburgh, said of her approach: "She knew exactly how, and when, to push her victims in at the deep end, and she knew, also, that although they would flounder and splash about at first, it wouldn't be long before ... they would be swimming easily while she beamed approval from the bank".

In the conducive atmosphere of Dartington Holst resumed serious composition, largely abandoned during the hectic CEMA years. In 1943 she completed a Serenade for flute, viola and bassoon, a Suite for String Orchestra, and a choral work, Three Psalms. All these works were performed at a Wigmore Hall concert on 14 June 1943 devoted to her music. Other compositions from the Dartington years included Theme and Variations for solo violin, String Trio No. 1 (premiered by the Dartington Hall String Trio at the National Gallery on 17 July 1944), songs from the 16th-century anthology Tottel's Miscellany, an oboe concerto, and a string quartet. In October 1943 Britten and the tenor Peter Pears gave the first of several recitals at Dartington. A mutual respect and friendship developed between Britten and Holst, strengthened by their shared love of neglected music from the Renaissance and Baroque eras. Holst was convinced that Britten was the composer to continue and complete the work of her father in redefining the character of English music.

From 1945, while maintaining her commitment to Dartington, Holst began to widen her musical activities. As well as editing and preparing scores for Britten, she promoted Dartington as the base for Britten's new English Opera Group, although eventually Glyndebourne was preferred. In 1947 she encouraged the refugee violinist Norbert Brainin to form his own string quartet, and arranged its debut at Dartington, as the "Brainin Quartet", on 13 July 1947. Six months later, renamed the Amadeus Quartet, the group appeared at the Wigmore Hall, and went on to gain worldwide recognition. In 1948 she began work on a critical study of her father's music, a companion volume to her 1938 Gustav Holst biography. When this was published in 1951, most critics praised its objectivity, one critic venturing that she had been "unnecessarily harsh" in her judgements.

On 23 July 1950 Holst conducted the premiere of Britten's Five Flower Songs part songs in the open air at Dartington, composed for the 25th wedding anniversary of its owners. Rising standards of achievement at Dartington enabled Holst to organise performances of more demanding works, such as Bach's Mass in B minor in July 1950 to honour the 200th anniversary of Bach's death. Three years in preparation, this endeavour brought a tribute from one of the audience: "I don't know, and can't imagine what the music of heaven is like. But when we all get there, please God, if any conducting is still necessary I hope your services will be required and that I will be in the chorus".

By the middle of 1950 Holst's professional focus was changing. She had attended the first two Aldeburgh Festivals in 1948 and 1949, and in 1950 accepted a commission to provide a choral work for performance at the 1951 festival; The work was the song cycle for female voices and harp, Welcome Joy and Welcome Sorrow. Sensing that it was time to leave Dartington, she gave a year's notice, part of which was spent on sabbatical, studying Indian music at Rabindranath Tagore's university in West Bengal. A fruit of this visit was her Ten Indian Folk Tunes for recorder. On 21 July 1951 her one-act opera, Benedick and Beatrice, was performed at Dartington, to mark her departure.

=== Aldeburgh ===
Without definite plans for her future after Dartington, Holst toured Europe, collecting music that she would later edit for performance, including madrigals by Carlo Gesualdo which she found "very exciting". At home, although not formally employed by Britten, she worked with him on several projects, including a new performing version of Henry Purcell's Dido and Aeneas, and the preparation of the vocal and full scores for Britten's opera Billy Budd. Pears, who had observed Holst's overall contributions to musical life at Dartington, believed she could help Britten and the Aldeburgh Festival on a more formal basis, and shortly after the 1952 festival Britten invited her to come and work with him. She agreed, and moved to lodgings in Aldeburgh.

==== Assistant to Britten ====
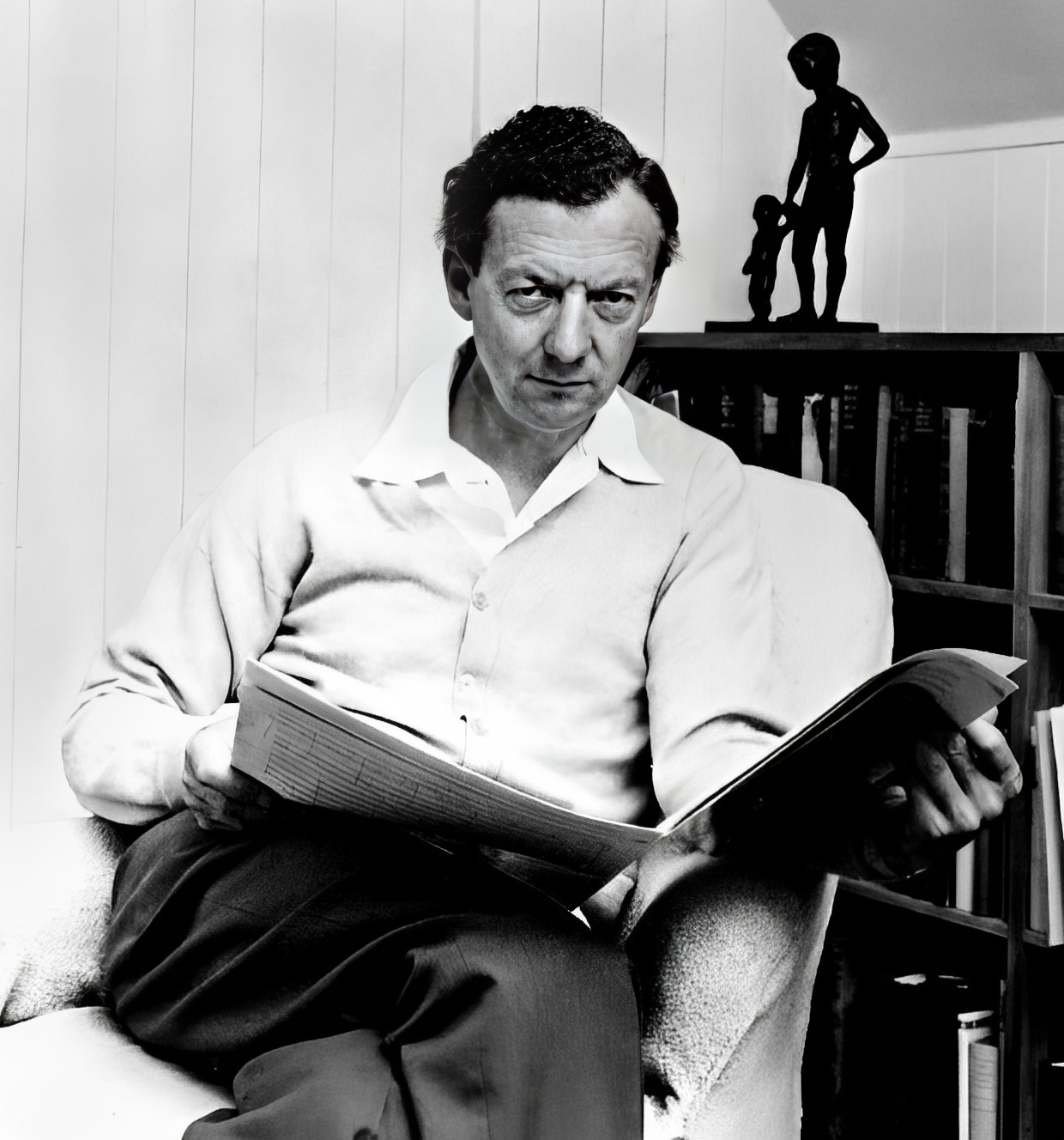
Benjamin Britten, photographed in the mid-1960

When Holst joined Britten, the financial arrangement was vague; Britten paid her on a piecemeal basis rather than a regular salary, unaware that she had made over her rights to her father's estate to her mother and had little money of her own. As a result, she lived very frugally in Aldeburgh, but her commitment to Britten overrode her own physical comfort. For the next dozen years her life was organised around the joint objectives of assisting Britten and developing the Aldeburgh Festival. Alongside this work, she made many choral and vocal arrangements, promoted her father's music, and wrote books, articles and programme notes. (Note: Books written by Imogen Holst in this period include The Book of the Dolmetsch Descant Recorder (1957); Tune (1961); and An ABC of Music (1963).)

For the first 18 months of her association with Britten, Holst kept a diary which, Grogan says, forms a record of her "unconditional belief in Britten's achievement and status, and her absolute devotion to his work". The first of Britten's works to which she made a significant contribution was the opera Gloriana, scheduled to form part of the 1953 Coronation celebrations. The short timescale for the writing of the opera placed considerable pressure on the composer and his new assistant, strains that were dramatised 60 years later in a radio play, Imo and Ben. (Note: The play, by Mark Ravenhill, was broadcast on 30 June 2013.) Holst's main task with Gloriana was to copy Britten's pencil sketches and prepare the vocal and piano scores which the singers needed for rehearsals by February 1953. Later she assisted him with the writing of the full orchestral score, and performed similar services with his next opera, The Turn of the Screw (1954). When Britten was under pressure during the composition of his ballet The Prince of the Pagodas (1956), Holst accompanied him to Switzerland, to remain by his side as he completed the work. (Note: Britten dedicated the ballet jointly to Imogen Holst and Ninette de Valois.) She took great pleasure in her association with Britten's opera for children, Noye's Fludde (1957), for which she showed Britten how to achieve a unique raindrop effect by hitting a row of china mugs with a wooden spoon. She and Britten combined to collect and publish music for the recorder, in a series published by Boosey and Hawkes (1954–59), and jointly wrote a popular introductory book, The Story of Music (1958).

Holst continued to assist Britten with all his major compositions until 1964, at that point she determined to give priority to the final securing of her father's musical legacy, to re-establish her career as a composer, and to pursue a more independent path. She relinquished her post as Britten's assistant, while remaining personally devoted to Britten. She did not leave Aldeburgh, and continued her work with the annual Aldeburgh Festival.

==== Artistic director ====
In 1956 Holst's role in the Aldeburgh Festival was formalised when she joined Britten and Pears as one of the festival's artistic directors, taking responsibility for programmes and performers. For the 1956 festival she scheduled a performance of Gustav Holst's opera Savitri, the first of several Gustav Holst works that she introduced to the festival in the ensuing years. (Note: In 1961 Holst persuaded Britten to conduct her father's tone-poem Egdon Heath, and 1962 saw a performance of Ode to Death.) Savitri was offered as part of a double bill that included Imogen's arrangement of John Blow's 17th century opera Venus and Adonis. In 1957 she instituted late-night concerts, and in 1962 she organised a series devoted to Flemish music, in which she had recently become interested. She also devised frequent programmes of church music, for performance at Aldeburgh parish church. Since moving to Aldeburgh in 1952, Holst had lived in a series of lodgings and rented flats. In 1962 she moved to a small contemporary bungalow built for her in Church Walk, where she lived for the rest of her life. The house was built on the edge of the site where it had been hoped to build a Festival Theatre. When that plan was abandoned in favour of a move to Snape Maltings, the bungalow was built anyway by the architect H. T. Cadbury-Brown, who allowed Holst to live there rent-free.

In 1964 Holst began composing again, and in 1965 accepted commissions for two large-scale works: The Sun's Journey, a cantata for female voices, and the Trianon Suite, composed for the Trianon Youth Orchestra of Ipswich. In 1965 and 1966 she published two books, studies of Bach and Britten. The latter work caused some shock and surprise by failing to mention the contributions to Britten's successes of several key figures in Britten's earlier career who had subsequently fallen out of favour, such as his former librettists Eric Crozier and Ronald Duncan. Between 1966 and 1970 Holst recorded a number of her father's works with the Purcell Singers and the English Chamber Orchestra, under the Argo and Lyrita labels. Among these recordings was the Double Violin Concerto, which she conducted with Emanuel Hurwitz as soloist. Forty years earlier she had acted as the rehearsal pianist before the work's first performance.

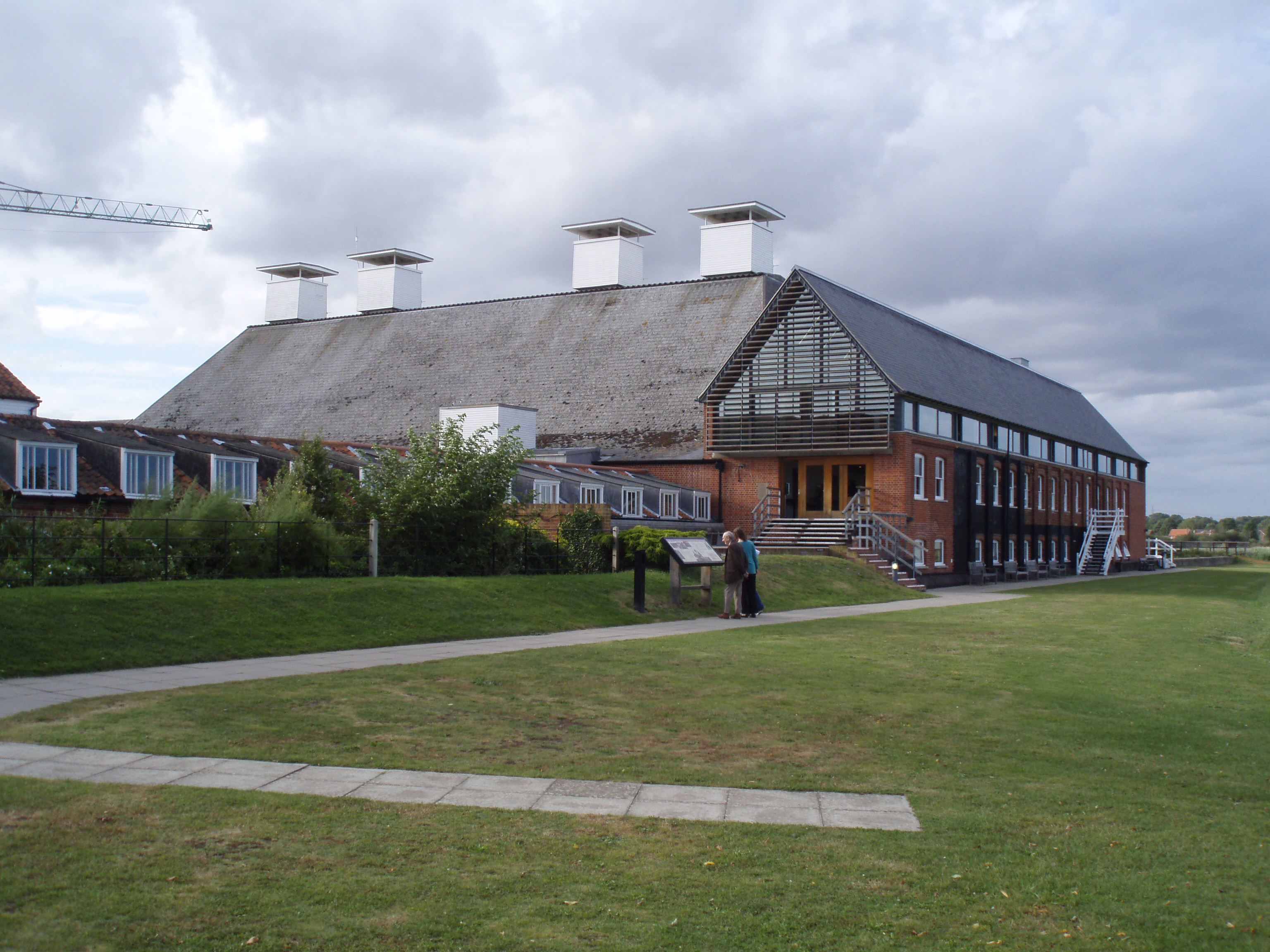
The concert hall at Snape Maltings, home of the Aldeburgh Festival from 1967

Holst had formed the Purcell Singers, a small semi-professional choir, in October 1952, largely at the instigation of Pears. (Note: The choir was given its name in December 1953 by Ralph Vaughan Williams, and first performed under that name in April 1954.) From 1954 the choir became regular performers at the Aldeburgh Festival, with programmes ranging from rarely heard medieval music to 20th-century works. Among choir members who later achieved individual distinction were the bass-baritone John Shirley-Quirk, the tenors Robert Tear and Philip Langridge, and the founder and conductor of the Heinrich Schütz Choir, Roger Norrington. Langridge remembered with particular pleasure a performance in Orford church of Thomas Tallis's forty-part motet Spem in alium, on 2 July 1963. When she gave up the conductorship of the choir in 1967, much of its musical mission, in particular its commitment to early music, was assumed by other groups, such as Norrington's Schütz Choir and the Purcell Consort formed by the ex-Purcell Singers chorister Grayston Burgess.

On 2 June 1967 Holst shared the podium with Britten in the concert inaugurating the Aldeburgh Festival's new home at the Snape Maltings. (Note: In 1969, just after the opening concert of that year's festival, the Maltings was destroyed by fire; it was rebuilt in time for the 1970 festival.) From 1972 Holst was involved with the development of educational classes at the Maltings, which began with weekend singing classes and developed into the Britten-Pears School for Advanced Musical Studies, with its own training orchestra. By this time Imogen's performances at the festival had become increasingly rare, but in 1975 she conducted a concert of Gustav Holst's brass band music, held outdoors at Framlingham Castle. A report of the event described an evening of "persistent drizzle ... until a diminutive figure in a special scarlet dress took the conductor's baton. The band was transformed, and played Holst's Suite as it has never been played before".

Britten had been in poor health since undergoing heart surgery in 1973, and on 4 December 1976 he died. Holst was unsure that she could maintain a working relationship with Pears alone, and on reaching the age of 70 in 1977, decided she would retire as artistic director after that year's festival. She made her final festival appearance as a performer when she stood in for the indisposed conductor André Previn at the Snape Maltings Training Orchestra's inaugural festival concert. On retirement, she accepted the honorary title of Artistic Director Emerita.

== Later career ==
Gustav Holst's centenary was celebrated in 1974, when Imogen published a Thematic Catalogue of Gustav Holst's Music and founded the Holst Birthplace Museum in Cheltenham. The centenary was the occasion for the publication of the first volume of a facsimile edition of Gustav Holst's manuscripts, on which Imogen worked with the help of the composer Colin Matthews. Three more facsimile volumes followed in the years up to 1983, at which point the increasing costs, and Imogen's failing health led to the abandonment of the project. As part of the 1974 centenary, she negotiated performances of Savitri and The Wandering Scholar at Aldeburgh and Sadler's Wells, and helped to arrange exhibitions of Gustav Holst's life and works at Aldeburgh and the Royal Festival Hall.

Apart from her books concerned with her father's life and works, Holst continued to write on other aspects of music. In addition to numerous articles she published a short study of the Renaissance composer William Byrd (1972) and a handbook for conductors of amateur choirs (1973). She continued to compose, usually short pieces but with occasional larger-scale orchestral works such as the Woodbridge Suite (1970) and the Deben Calendar (1977), the latter a series of twelve sketches depicting the River Deben in Suffolk at different phases of the year. Her last major composition was a String Quintet, written in 1982 and performed in October of that year by the Endellion Quartet, augmented by the cellist Steven Isserlis.

In April 1979 Holst was present when Queen Elizabeth the Queen Mother opened the new Britten–Pears School building in Snape. The building included a new library—the Gustav Holst Library—to which Holst had donated a large amount of material, including books which her father had used in his own teaching career. She had intended that, after 1977, her retirement from the Aldeburgh Festival would be total, but she made an exception in 1980 when she organised a 70th birthday celebration concert for Pears.

== Death ==
Shortly after the 1977 Aldeburgh Festival, Holst became seriously ill with what she described as "a coronary angina". Thereafter, angina was a recurrent problem, although she continued to work and fulfil engagements. However, by early 1984 the deterioration in her health was noticeable to her friends. She died at home of heart failure on 9 March 1984 and was buried in Aldeburgh churchyard five days later in a plot a few yards away from Britten's. An obituary tribute in the magazine Early Music emphasised her long association with music in the Aldeburgh church, where she "[brought] iridescently to life facets of that tradition to which her own life had been dedicated and which she presented as a continuing source of strength and wonder". Ursula Vaughan Williams wrote: "Imogen had something of the medieval scholar about her ... content with few creature comforts if there was enough music, enough work, enough books to fill her days. Indeed, she always filled her days, making twenty-four hours contain what most of us need twice that time to do".

In 2007, Holst's centenary was recognised at Aldeburgh by several special events, including a recital in the parish church by the Navarra Quartet in which works by Purcell and Schubert were mixed with Imogen's own The Fall of the Leaf for solo cello, and the String Quintet. The latter work was described by Andrew Clements in The Guardian as "genuinely memorable ... The set of variations with which the quintet ends dissolves into a series of bare solo lines, linking Holst's music to her father's".

Holst never married, though she enjoyed a number of romantic friendships, notably with the future poet Miles Tomalin, whom she met when she was a pupil at St Paul's. The two were close until 1929, and exchanged poetry; Tomalin married in 1931. Many years after the relationship ended, Holst admitted to Britten that she would have married Tomalin.

=== Honours ===
Holst was made a Fellow of the Royal College of Music in 1966. She was awarded honorary doctorates from the universities of Essex (1968), Exeter (1969) and Leeds (1983). She was given honorary membership of the Royal Academy of Music in 1970. Holst was appointed a Commander of the Order of the British Empire (CBE) in the 1975 New Year Honours for services to music.

== Music ==
Imogen Holst was a part-time composer, intermittently productive within her extensive portfolio of musical activities. In her earlier years she was among a group of young British women composers—Elizabeth Maconchy and Elisabeth Lutyens were others—whose music was regularly performed and broadcast. According to a later critic, her Mass in A minor of 1927 showed "confident and imaginative layering of voices, building to a satisfying Agnus Dei". However, for long periods in her subsequent career Holst barely composed at all. After the RCM, her most active years as a composer were at Dartington in the 1940s and the "post-Britten" period after 1964. Her output of compositions, arrangements and edited music is extensive but has received only limited critical attention. Much of it is unpublished and has usually been neglected after its initial performance.

"Early Tippett and Gerald Finzi are perhaps Holst's closest matches stylistically, but it's the String Quintet that really shows off her independence, with its rustic depictions in its first two movements, and a complete change of mood for the finale, which is a set of variations on the last theme written in her father's notebook"

— The Guardian, 30 January 2009.

The oeuvre comprises instrumental, vocal, orchestral and choral music. Holst was primarily influenced, as Gustav Holst's daughter, by what the analyst Christopher Tinker terms "her natural and inescapable relationship with the English musical establishment", by her close personal relationship with her father, and her love of folksong. Some of her first compositions reflect the pastoralism of Ralph Vaughan Williams, who taught her at the RCM. In her teaching and EFDSS years during the 1930s she became known for her folksong arrangements but composed little music herself. The personal style that emerged in the 1940s incorporated her affinity with folksong and dance, her intense interest in English music of the 16th and 17th centuries, and her taste for innovation. In her 1930 suite for solo viola, she had begun experimenting with scale patterns; by the 1940s she was incorporating her own six- and eight-note scales into her chamber music and occasionally into choral works such as the Five Songs (1944). This experimentation reappears in later works; in Hallo My Fancy (1972) a new scale is introduced for each verse, while the choir provides free harmonisation to a solo voice. In Homage to William Morris (1984), among her final works, Tinker notes her use of dissonance "to add strength to the musical articulation of the text". By contrast, the String Quintet of 1982, the work which Holst herself thought made her "a real composer", is characterised by the warmth of its harmonies.

Much of Holst's choral music was written for amateur performance. Critics have observed a clear distinction in quality between these pieces and the choral works written for professional choirs, particularly those for women's voices. These latter pieces, says Tinker, incorporate her best work as an original composer. Record companies were slow in recognising her commercial potential, and not until 2009 was a CD issued devoted entirely to her music—a selection of her works for strings. The Guardian's reviewer welcomed the recording: "[T]here is a great deal of English music of far less worth that is frequently praised to the skies". In 2012 a selection of her choral music, sung by the Clare College Choir, was recorded by Harmonia Mundi. One review of this recording picks out Welcome Joy and Welcome Sorrow, written for female voices with harp accompaniment, as "[giving] an insight into her own, softly nuanced, pioneering voice". Another mentions the "Three Psalms" setting, where "inner rhythms are underscored by the subtle string ostinatos pulsing beneath".

=== List of recordings ===
- String Quartet No 1. Brindisi String Quartet. Conifer CDCF 196 (1990)
- Phantasy Quartet, Duo for viola and piano, String Trio No. 1, The Fall of the Leaf, Sonata for violin and cello, String Quintet. Court Lane Music CLM37601 (2009)
- Mass in A minor, A Hynme to Christ, Three Psalms, Welcome Joy and Welcome Sorrow, Hello my fancy. Choir of Clare College, Cambridge. Harmonia Mundi HMU907576 (2012)
- Suite for viola, Rosalind Ventris, Delphian DCD 34293 (2023)
- 'Discovering Imogen'. Persephone overture; Allegro assai for strings; Suite for Strings; Variations on "Loth to Depart"; What Man is He?; Festival Anthem; On Westhall Hill. BBC Concert Orchestra, BBC Singers, cond. Alice Farnham. NMC (2024)
- Welcome Joy and Welcome Sorrow, Corvus Consort cond. Freddie Crowley. Chandos CHAN 5350 (2024)
- Out of Your Sleep Arise and Wake (1968), Choir of The Queen’s College, Oxford, Signum Classics SIGCD 979 (2026)
- The Unfortunate Traveller, suite for strings, CPO 555 808-2 (2026)

== Published texts ==
Publication details refer to the book's first UK publication.

- Gustav Holst: A biography. London: Oxford University Press. 1938. OCLC 852118145. (revised edition 1969)
- The Music of Gustav Holst. London: Oxford University Press. 1951. OCLC 881989. (revised editions 1968 and 1985, the latter with Holst's Music Reconsidered added)
- The Book of the Dolmetsch Descant Recorder. London: Boosey & Hawkes. 1957. OCLC 221221906.
- The Story of Music ("The Wonderful World" series). London: Rathbone. OCLC 2182017. (co-author with Benjamin Britten)
- Heirs and Rebels: Letters Written to Each Other, and Occasional Writings on Music, by Ralph Vaughan Williams and Gustav Holst. London: Oxford University Press. 1959. OCLC 337514. (co-editor with Ursula Vaughan Williams):
- Henry Purcell, 1659–1695: Essays on his Music. London: Oxford University Press. 1959. OCLC 602569. (editor)
- Henry Purcell: the Story of his Life and Work. London: Boosey & Hawkes. 1961. OCLC 1200203.
- Tune. London: Faber & Faber. 1962. OCLC 843455729.
- An ABC of Music: a Short Practical Guide to the Basic Essentials of Rudiments, Harmony, and Form. Oxford: Oxford University Press. 1963. ISBN 0-19-317103-1.
- Your Book of Music. London: Faber & Faber. 1964. OCLC 170598.
- Bach ("Great Composers" series). London: Faber & Faber. 1965. OCLC 748710834.
- Britten ("Great Composers" series). London: Faber & Faber. 1966. OCLC 243904447.
- Byrd ("Great Composers" series). London: Faber & Faber. 1972. ISBN 0-571-09813-4.
- Conducting a Choir: a Guide for Amateurs. London: Oxford University Press. 1973. ISBN 0-19-313407-1.
- Holst ("Great Composers" series). London: Faber & Faber. 1974. ISBN 0-571-09967-X. (second edition 1981)
- A Thematic Catalogue of Gustav Holst's Music. London: Faber Music, in conjunction with G & I Holst Ltd. 1974. ISBN 0-571-10004-X.

Imogen Holst also wrote numerous articles, pamphlets, essays, introductions and programme notes during the period 1935–1984. (Note: A partial list of articles and programme notes by Imogen Holst is included in the bibliography, pp. 464–65 within Grogan, Christopher (2010). Imogen Holst: A Life in Music (revised ed.). Woodbridge, Suffolk: The Boydell Press. ISBN 978-1-84383-599-8.)
