= Two Eastern Pictures =

1911 choral composition by Gustav Holst

- Choral work by Gustav Holst
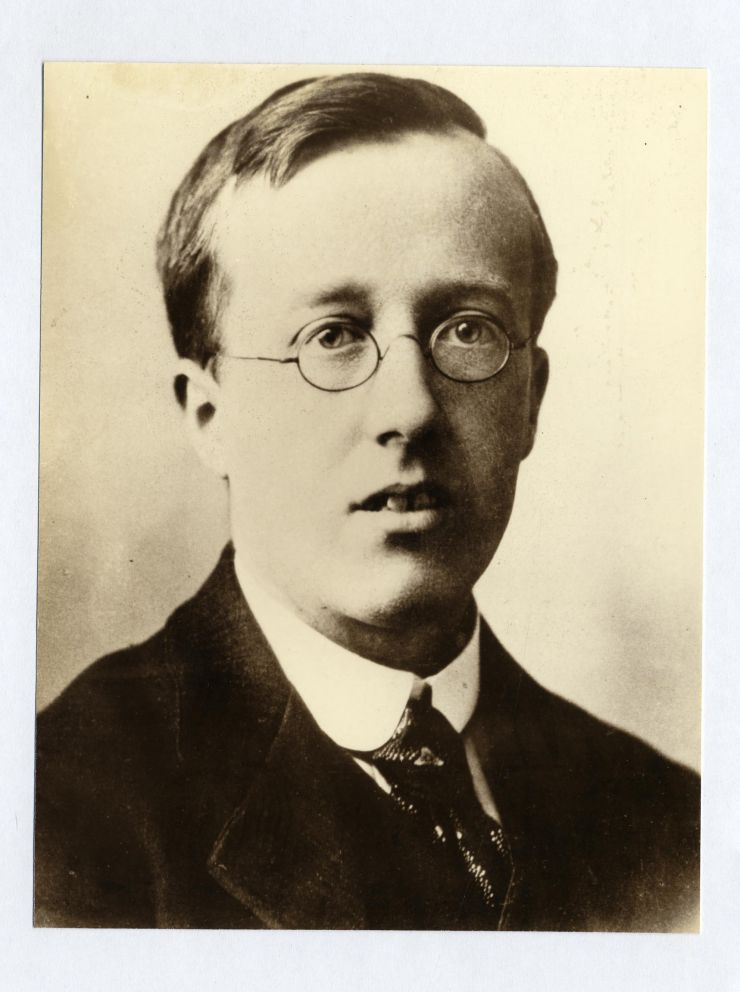
- The composer in his mid-twenties, c. 1901.
- Librettist: Composer's own translation from Sanskrit
- Language: English
- Based on: 'Spring' and 'Summer' from the ancient Indian poem Ṛtusaṃhāra
- Premiere: 21 March 1912; Blackburn

Two Eastern Pictures is a short choral work by the English composer Gustav Holst, completed in 1911. Holst based his text on parts of the ancient Indian poem Ṛtusaṃhāra, which he translated from Sanskrit into English.

The work was first performed on 21 March 1912, by the Blackburn Ladies' Choir, conducted by Frank Duckworth. According to the program notes, the songs had been 'specially written' for that choir.

== Text and accompaniment ==
Holst wrote Two Eastern Pictures for SSAA choir (two distinct Soprano sections and two distinct Alto sections), accompanied by harp or piano. The work is in two movements, which can be performed in a total of around four or five minutes:

1. Spring ('The warrior hither comes')
2. Summer ('The fierce glaring day is gone')

Holst translated the words himself from parts of the Sanskrit lyric poem Ṛtusaṃhāra. The composer had studied Sanskrit literature at University College in London, and with the academic Mabel Bode. Holst wrote his own version of the words, then made any adjustments required after comparing them with published translations.

Director of the Calliope women's ensemble, Régine Théodoresco, says the composer's choice of harp accompaniment in Two Eastern Pictures is "a perfect match...between idea and instrument".

Théodoresco says that Holst knows how to deploy the full palette of a female ensemble – not restricting altos to the lower registers nor sopranos to the higher ones. Holst "speaks the language of choirs" and she attributes this to his years of experience as a music teacher, conducting women's and children's choirs.

== Ṛtusaṃhāra – Pageant of the Seasons ==
The lyric poem Ṛtusaṃhāra has six sections, one for each of the Indian seasons, and using the thematic backdrop of lovers reacting to the changing landscapes. Its title has been variously translated as Pageant of the Seasons, Medley of the Seasons or Garland of the Seasons.

Ṛtusaṃhāra has commonly been attributed to the famous poet Kālidāsa, although not all scholars agree. According to Siegfried Lienhard, it was written by an unknown poet some time between 100 A.D. and the 5th century. Scholars V.V. Mirashi and N.R Navlekar believe the poem is indeed by Kālidāsa, although an 'immature' work.

Some other scholars, including M. Srinivasachariar and T. S. Narayana Sastri, believe that it was the work of a different poet, whose name was also 'Kālidāsa'. According to Sastri, there were three 'Kālidāsas', including two whose texts were adapted for compositions by Holst:

1. Kālidāsa (alias Kotijit); author of Ṛtusaṃhāram, the basis for Two Eastern Pictures.
2. Kālidāsa (alias Medhārudra); author of Meghadūtam, the basis for The Cloud Messenger.

Ṛtusaṃhāra was collated by William Jones, and was the first Sanskrit text to be printed and published in Calcutta (Kolkata) in 1792.

== Holst's 'Indian' period ==
Over several years, Holst drew inspiration from Indian culture a number of times, with notable examples being Hymns from the Rig Veda, The Cloud Messenger and the opera Sāvitri. In 1919, Edwin Evans, when reviewing the composer's ongoing development, described this as Holst's 'Sanskrit' period. In the 1980s, in Holst and India: 'Maya' to 'Sita', Raymond Head described it as Holst's 'Indian' period.

During this period, musicologist Nalini Ghuman sees a clear influence of the Indian classical music tradition on Holst's use of harmony, texture and mode. In her book, Resonances of the Raj, she provides examples of how he drew upon elements such as the ālāp and rāga.

Ethnomusicologist Martin Clayton says that at least one Holst biographer was reluctant to acknowledge that the composer had been directly influenced by Indian music. Clayton says that Holst could have heard it being played by visiting musicians, or through his association with the violinist Maud Mann, an authority on the subject.

The Upanishads was one of a small number of books that Holst kept with him for his whole life. According to Imogen Holst, her father began exploring Indian culture and history after reading the book Silent Gods and Sun Steeped Lands by R. W. Frazer.

== Recordings ==
Performers	Album	Year	Label
Holst Singers; Sioned Williams, harp; Stephen Layton, conductor.	This I have done for my true love	1994	Hyperion
Etherea Vocal Ensemble; Alan Murchie, keyboard; Grace Cloutier, harp; Derek Greten-Harrison, director.	Hymn to the Dawn	2013	Delos
Calliope Women's Chorus; Nicolas Jouve, piano; Anaïs Gaudemard, harp; Régine Théodoresco, director.	Holst: The Sun Rising Through the Mist	2014	Ligia

Sources: WorldCat and Apple Classical
