= Indra (Holst) =

1903 composition by Gustav Holst

- Symphonic poem
- by Gustav Holst
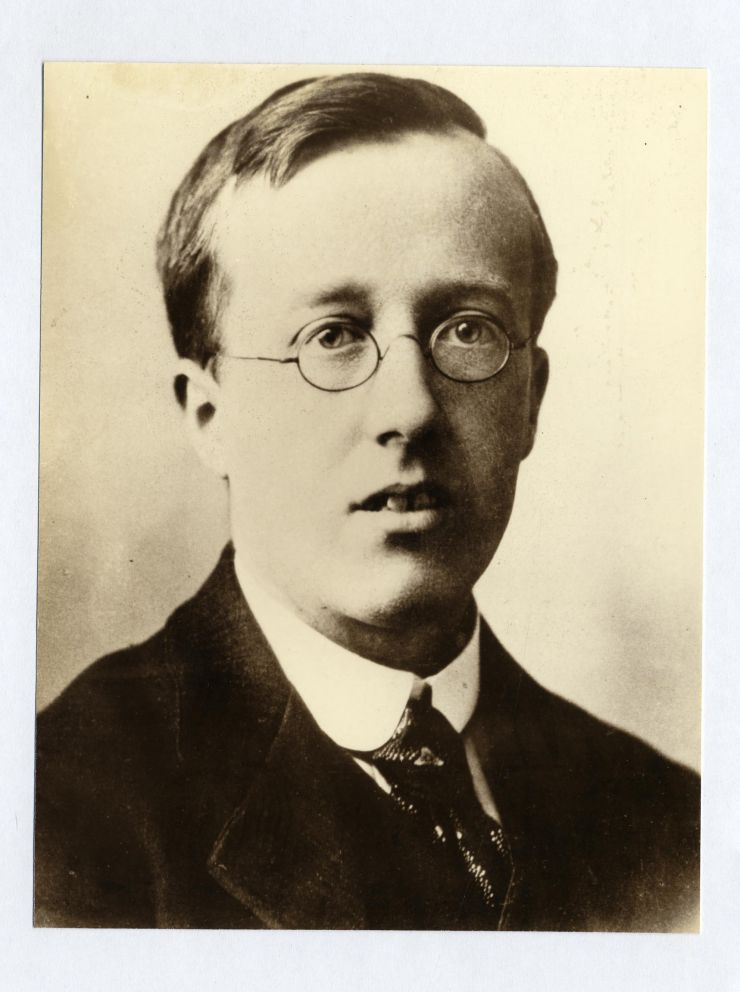
- The composer in his mid-twenties c. 1901.
- Opus: 13
- Composed: 1903
- Performed: 25 October 1987
- Movements: One

Indra, Op. 13, is a symphonic poem by the English composer Gustav Holst, which was completed in April 1903. It was one of the first of Holst's works to draw upon his studies of Sanskrit literature. The name refers to Indra, the Hindu god associated with the weather, storms and war.

Holst's friend and fellow music student, Fritz Hart, recalls the work being 'tried-over' by a student orchestra not long after it was composed. However, its first public performance was not until 25 October 1987 at Chipping Norton School, with the North Oxfordshire Scratch Orchestra conducted by Raymond Head.

== Composition ==
=== Indra's battle ===
Holst's symphonic poem depicts a battle to the death between the god Indra and the dragon Vritra. Indra was astride his divine white elephant, Airavata. He was armed with a thunderbolt and supported by his attendant warriors, the Maruts, or stormclouds. Indra was victorious and slew the dragon, which had been withholding the rain from the parched fields.

As part of his introduction to the work, Holst wrote:

"...There is drought in the land. The dragon Vrita has seized the rain clouds and holds them fast in his grasp. Famishing men go wandering hopelessly under the unceasing glare of the sun only to sink down exhausted. One voice among them is heard praying to Indra..."

=== Indra in the works of Holst ===
In a later work, Choral Hymns from the Rig Veda, (1907 to 1909), Holst would return to this theme with two of the hymns, Indra (God of Storm and Battle) and Hymn to Indra.

Holst's cantata The Cloud Messenger (1912) is based on the ancient lyric poem Meghadūta by Kālidāsa. In this poem, a demigod is banished to a remote mountain for allowing his master's garden to be trampled by Airavata, Indra's divine elephant. On the mountain, the demigod hails a passing cloud as a trusted "friend of Indra".

=== Traditional depictions ===
Indra is depicted as a saviour of mankind, armed with māyā, a superhuman power comprising thunder, lightning, mist etc. He is the most frequently mentioned deity in the Rig Veda (from ऋच्, "praise" and वेद, "knowledge"), an ancient Indian collection of Vedic Sanskrit hymns (sūktas). Its early layers are among the oldest extant texts in any Indo-European language. It is one of the four sacred canonical Hindu texts (śruti) known as the Vedas.

== Holst's Indian period ==
As a young man, Holst became interested in Hindu philosophy, and in 1899 studied Sanskrit literature at University College in London.

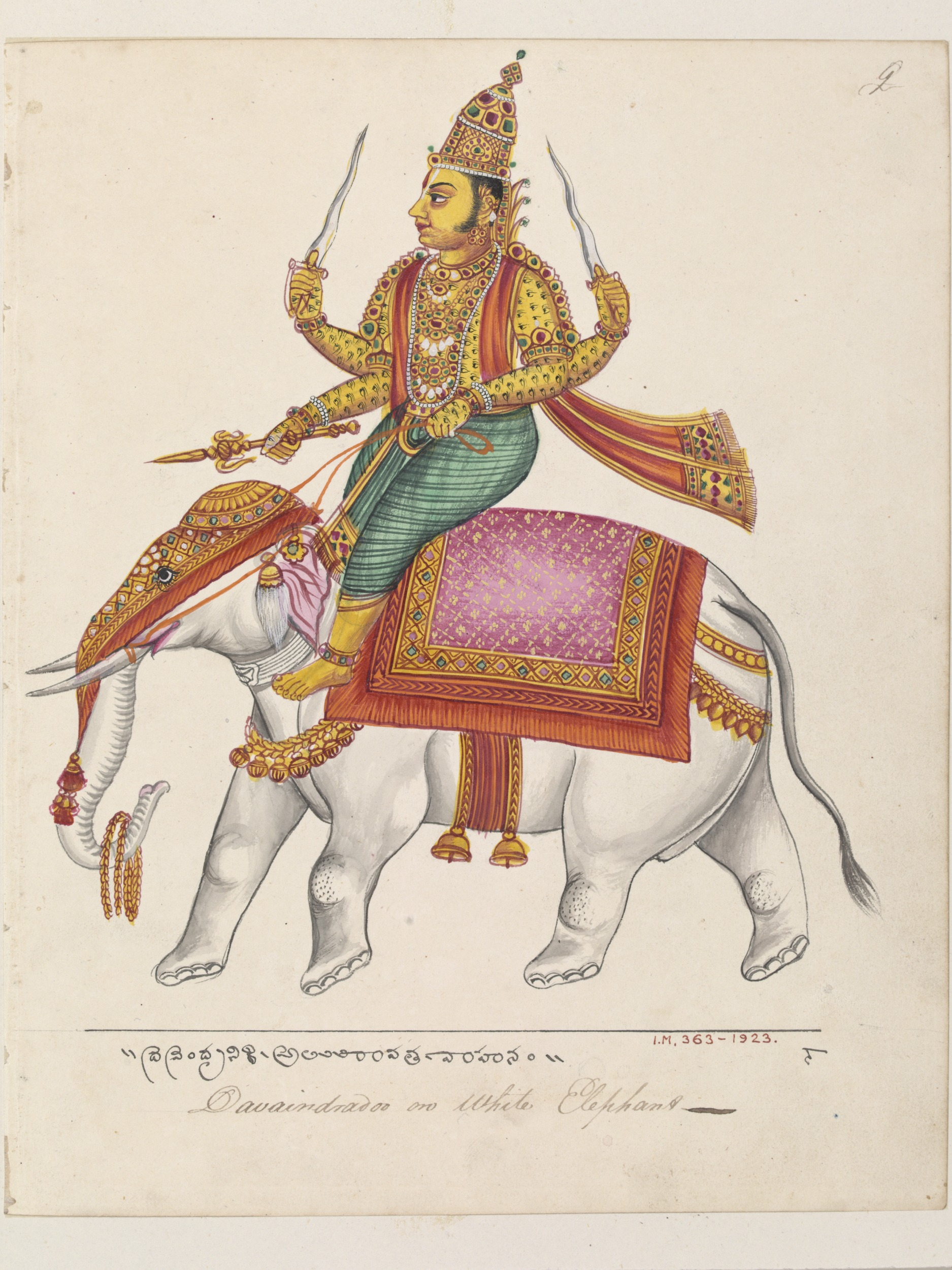
Indra, the god of storms and guardian of the east, riding on his white elephant, Airavata.

Over a period of several years, he drew inspiration from the Hindu tradition a number of times, with notable examples being the cantata The Cloud Messenger and the opera Sāvitri. In December 1919, writing in The Musical Times, Edwin Evans, when reviewing the composer's ongoing development, described this as Holst's 'Sanskrit' period. In the 1980s, in Holst and India: 'Maya' to 'Sita', Raymond Head described it as Holst's 'Indian' period.

During this period, musicologist Nalini Ghuman sees a clear influence of the Indian classical music tradition on Holst's use of harmony, texture and mode. In her book Resonances of the Raj, she provides examples of how he drew upon elements such as the ālāp and rāga.

Ethnomusicologist Martin Clayton says that at least one Holst biographer was reluctant to acknowledge that the composer had been directly influenced by Indian music. Clayton says that Holst could have heard it being played by visiting musicians, or through his association with the violinist Maud Mann, an authority on the subject.

Imogen Holst suggested that her father studied Sanskrit with academic Mabel Bode in the late 1890s. However, Raymond Head believes this took place during the period 1899–1905, and that he studied the literature, rather than the language itself.

The Upanishads was one of a small number of books that Holst kept with him for his whole life. According to Imogen Holst, her father began exploring Indian culture and history after reading the book Silent Gods and Sun Steeped Lands by R. W. Frazer.

== Recordings ==
Orchestra	Conductor	Year	Venue	Label
London Philharmonic Orchestra	David Atherton	1993		Lyrita
Ulster Orchestra	JoAnn Falletta	2012	Ulster Hall	Naxos
BBC Philharmonic	Andrew Davis	2018	BBC Manchester studio	Chandos

Sources: WorldCat and Apple Classical
