= Hymns from the Rig Veda =

Choral compositions by Gustav Holst

- Choral work by Gustav Holst
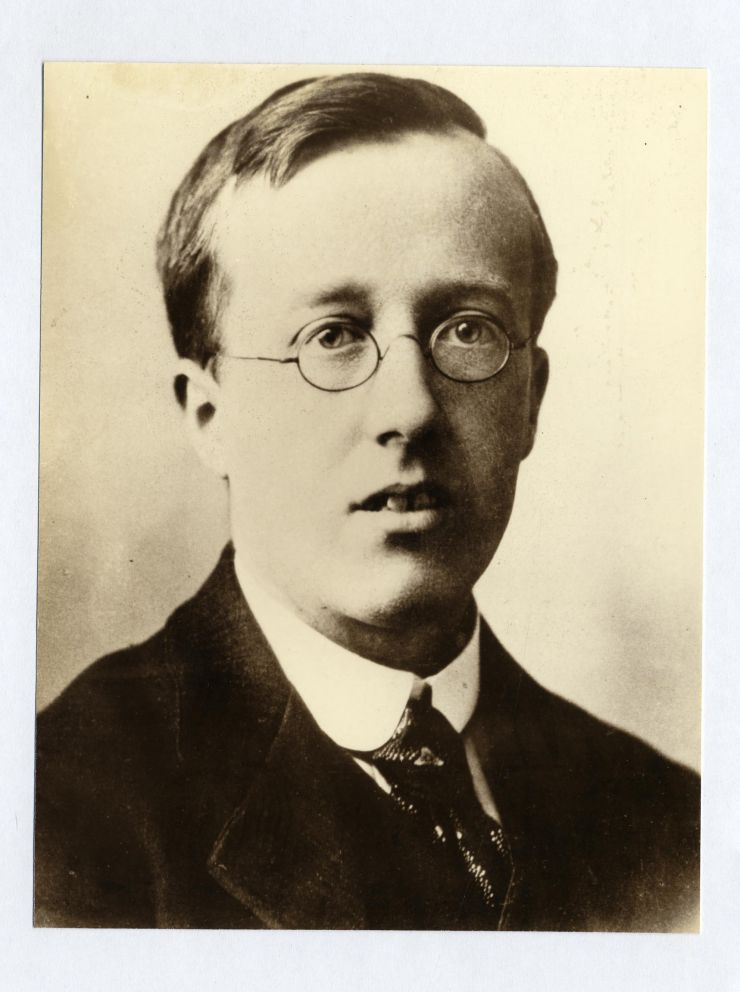
- The composer c. 1901
- Librettist: Composer's own translation of ancient Sanskrit texts
- Language: English
- Based on: The Rig Veda

Hymns from the Rig Veda, Op. 24 and Op. 26, is a collection of vedic hymns by the English composer Gustav Holst, completed in the period from 1907 to 1909. There are 23 published hymns, based on texts that Holst translated himself from Sanskrit literature. He also incorporated elements of the Indian classical music tradition when composing the work.

The first series, Op. 24, comprises three sets of three solo hymns, while the second series, Op. 26, comprises four groups of choral hymns in sets of varying sizes.

Some of the solo hymns were first performed by Edith Clegg in 1907, while some of the choral hymns were premiered in 1911 by the Blackburn Ladies' Choir. Over the next two years, a number of the choral hymn groups were performed both by the Edward Mason Choir, and by choirs at Newcastle-on-Tyne under the direction of William Gillies Whittaker.

== Opus 24 ==
Nine hymns for solo voice and piano

1. Ushas (Goddess of Dawn)	2. Varuna I (Sky)	3. Maruts (Stormclouds)
4. Indra (God of Storm and Battle)	5. Varuna II (The Waters)	6. Song of the Frogs
7. Vāc (Goddess of Divine Speech)	8. Creation	9. Faith

A tenth hymn in this group, Ratri (Goddess of the Night) had been written but not published when Richard Capell reviewed the Hymns from the Rig Veda in 1927.

== Opus 26 ==
Group 1

Three hymns for chorus and orchestra

1. Battle Hymn	2. To the Unknown God	3. Funeral Hymn

Group 2

Three hymns for female voices and orchestra (also arranged for piano with optional violins)

4. To Varuna	5. To Agni	6. Funeral Chant

Group 3

Four hymns for female voices and harp (piano)

7. Hymn to the Dawn	8. Hymn to the Waters	9. Hymn to Vena	10.Hymn to the Travellers

Group 4

Four hymns for male voices and piano (also arranged for strings with optional brass)

11. Hymn to Agni	12. Hymn to Soma	13. Hymn to Manas	14. Hymn to Indra

== Sacred ancient texts ==
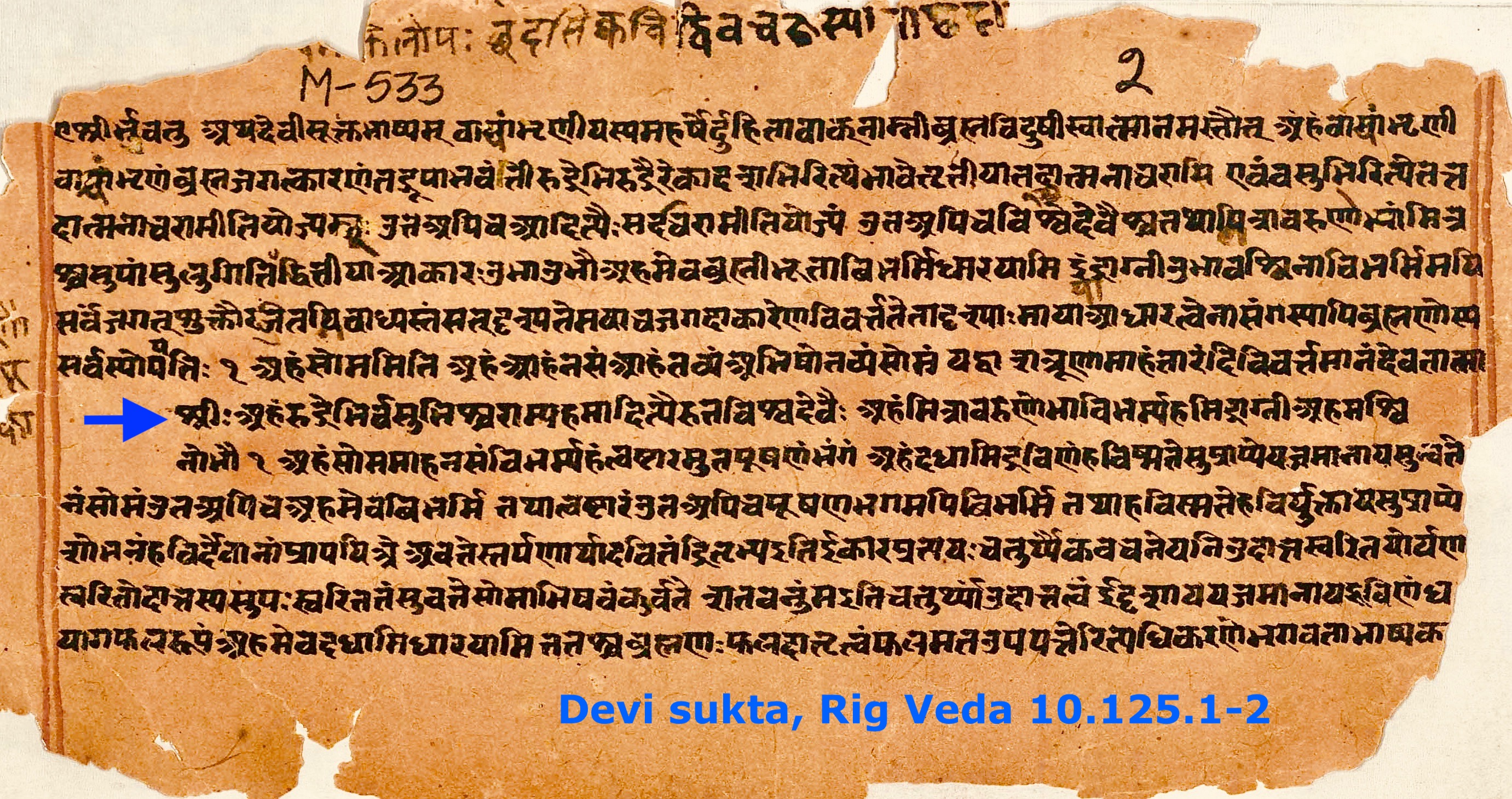
The Devi sūkta highlights the goddess tradition of Hinduism. It is cited in Devi Mahatmya and recited every year during the Durga Puja festival.

The Rig Veda or Rigveda (from ऋच्, "praise" and वेद, "knowledge") is an ancient Indian collection of Vedic Sanskrit hymns (sūktas), and the oldest known Vedic Sanskrit text. Its early layers are among the oldest extant texts in any Indo-European language. It is one of the four sacred canonical Hindu texts (śruti) known as the Vedas.

Holst purchased Ralph Griffith's translations of the Rig Veda from Luzac & Co, a London bookseller specialising in oriental works. His copy of the work is now at St Paul's Girls' School.

Holst scholar Raymond Head suggests that the composer studied it in great depth, with many pages displaying signs of wear and pencil marks. Holst also read other works, such as On the Literature and History of the Veda by Rudolph Roth.

Holst had previously been inspired by the story about the god Indra's battle with Vritra (demon of the drought), for his symphonic poem Indra, completed in 1903.

== Indian musical influences ==
Musicologist Nalini Ghuman sees a clear influence of Indian music in Holst's use of harmony, texture and mode – first evident in the solo hymn, Vāruna.

She says that Vāruna's opening vocal phrase has roots in the unmetered ālāp, with Holst's approach aligning to the Indian classical music tradition. In this tradition, the singer introduces the note or phrase of a rāga above a constant drone, reinforcing the tonal centre.

Ghuman gives an example of Holst repeating a rāga–ālāp phrase three times in the Vāruna hymn:

1. "Oh thou great judge, Vāruna"
2. "To gain forgiveness, Vāruna"
3. "Thou knowest all, Vāruna"

Ghuman cites Vāruna as being – as had earlier been suggested by Imogen Holst – an example of where the composer was moving away from the influence of Wagner. Ghuman sees Holst's change of musical direction as being in "...a specifically Indian context", and that the composer was "...inspired by the modalities of rāga–ālāp unfolding over a drone in an improvisatory framework".

Director of the Calliope women's ensemble, Régine Théodoresco, says Holst knew the rāga system and took inspiration from it to create his own 'enchanting, imaginative' sound world. She gives an example of Hymn to the Travellers, and his use of the scale D - Eb - F# - G# - A - B - C - D.

Citing Hymn to the Dawn, Théodoresco says that Holst thinks polyphonically and "speaks the language of choirs". He knows how to deploy the full palette of a female ensemble – not restricting altos to the lower registers nor sopranos to the higher ones. She attributes this skill to his years of experience as a music teacher, conducting women's and children's choirs.

Ethnomusicologist Martin Clayton says that at least one Holst biographer was reluctant to acknowledge that the composer had been directly influenced by Indian music. Clayton says that Holst could have heard it being played by visiting musicians, or through his association with the violinist Maud Mann, an authority on the subject.

== Holst's Indian period ==
As a young man, Holst became interested in Hindu philosophy, and in 1899 studied Sanskrit literature at University College in London. Over a period of several years, Holst drew inspiration from the Hindu tradition a number of times, with notable examples being the cantata The Cloud Messenger and the opera Sāvitri.

In December 1919, writing in The Musical Times, Edwin Evans, when reviewing the composer's ongoing development, described this as Holst's 'Sanskrit' period. In the 1980s, in Holst and India: 'Maya' to 'Sita', Raymond Head described it as Holst's 'Indian' period.

Imogen Holst suggested that her father studied Sanskrit with academic Mabel Bode in the late 1890s. However, Raymond Head believes this took place during the period 1899–1905, and was a study of the literature rather than the language itself.

The Upanishads was one of a small number of books that Holst kept with him for his whole life. According to Imogen Holst, her father began exploring Indian culture and history after reading the book Silent Gods and Sun Steeped Lands by R. W. Frazer.

== Recordings ==
Opus 24 – solo hymns

Performers	Year	Label
Susan Gritton, soprano; Philip Langridge, tenor; Christopher Maltman, baritone; Louisa Fuller, violin; Stuart Bedford, piano.	1993	Collins Classics
Scott Robert Shaw, tenor; Hugo Eedle, cello; Klara Gronet, violin; George W. Warren, piano; Conceptus ensemble. Arranged by Timothy Collins.	2024	Divine Art

Opus 26 – choral hymns

Hymn group	Performers	Year	Label
Second	London Symphony Chorus; Richard Hickox; London Philharmonic Orchestra; Sir Charles Groves, conductor.	1984	HMV Greensleeve
Third	Purcell Singers (soprano and alto); Osian Ellis, harp; English Chamber Orchestra; Imogen Holst, conductor.	1966	Argo
Third	Etherea Vocal Ensemble; Alan Murchie, keyboard; Grace Cloutier, harp; Derek Greten-Harrison, director.	2013	Delos
Second and third	Calliope Women's Chorus; Nicolas Jouve, piano; Anaïs Gaudemard, harp; Régine Théodoresco, director.	2014	Ligia
First to fourth (some incomplete)	Royal College of Music Chamber Choir; Royal Philharmonic Orchestra; David Willcocks, conductor.	1985	Unicorn-Kanchana

Sources: WorldCat and Apple Classical
