= The Cloud Messenger (Holst) =

1912 choral composition by Gustav Holst

- Cantata by Gustav Holst
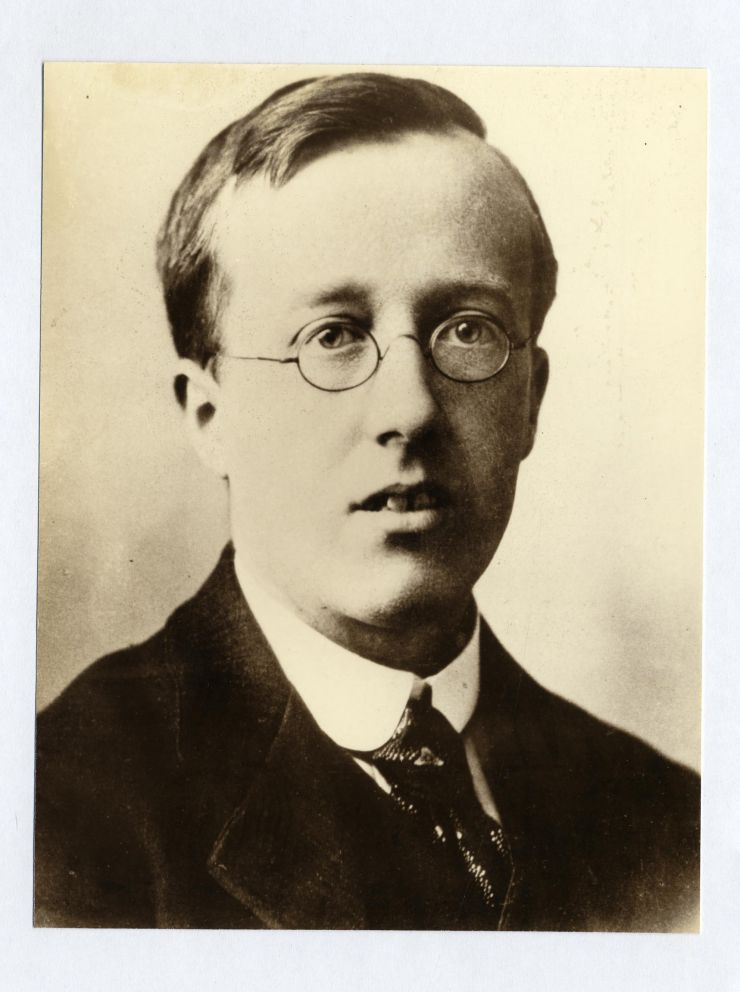
- The composer in his mid-twenties, c. 1901.
- Librettist: Composer, from an ancient Sanskrit poem
- Language: English
- Based on: Meghadūta ('The Cloud Messenger') by the Indian poet, Kālidāsa (c. 4th–5th century CE)
- Premiere: 1913; Queen's Hall, London

The Cloud Messenger, Op. 30, is a cantata for contralto solo, chorus and orchestra by the English composer Gustav Holst, based on Meghadūta, an ancient Sanskrit poem. Holst worked on it for several years, and it was completed in 1910. After some revisions, it was published in 1912.

The work was first performed on 4 March 1913 by the London Choral Society and New Symphony Orchestra conducted by the composer. It was a Queen's Hall concert presented by H. Balfour Gardiner.

In 1924, after a concert performance by the Langham Choral Society, a review in The Musical Times referred to the 'elaborate Oriental imagery' of Holst's text, combined with music that 'abounds in beauties'. According to that review, the work is consistent with the composer's Hymns from the Rig Veda, while looking ahead to the style of his Hymn of Jesus.

The work was frequently performed during the 1920s and '30s, however, over time its manuscript was misplaced. The score was reassembled by Christopher Palmer for the 1990 recording by Richard Hickox.

On 19 November 2016, it received its first public performance since the 1930s, with the Tonbridge Philharmonic and Choral Society conducted by Matthew Wilks, and the mezzo-soprano Linda Finnie.

== Inspiration ==
=== Meghadūta by Kalidasa ===
Meghadūta (Bengali: মেঘদূত, literally Cloud Messenger) is a lyric poem written by the great Sanskrit poet Kālidāsa (c. 4th–5th century CE). The poem describes how a newly married yakṣa (a nature spirit, or demi-god) neglects his daily duties, and allows his master's garden to be trampled by Airavata, an elephant belonging to the god Indra. As punishment, the yakṣa is exiled for a year to a remote mountain by his master, Kubera, the god of wealth.

After some time passes, the lonely yakṣa tries to convince a passing cloud to take a message of love to his wife back home. The yakṣa describes the beautiful sights and sounds the cloud will experience on its northward journey – arrays of colourful blossoms, the sweet sounds of birds, and awe-inspiring rivers and mountains. Along the way, pausing at the temple of Lord Shiva, the cloud's rumblings will act as the tabor (drum) at evening prayers. At the city of Alakā in the Himalayas, the yakṣa hopes that the cloud will deliver the message to his wife, and then return with a reply from her.

=== Translation to English ===
Meghadūta was first translated into English in 1813 by H. H. Wilson. Holst initially based his text on a version by R.W. Frazer, which the composer had read in the 1890s. In the program for the work's first performance, Holst included a note of thanks to Frazer for permission to make use of his version. In 1907, he purchased a version edited by Pandit Nabin Chandra Vidyaranta. Holst's copy is now in St Paul's Girls School, where he taught music. Holst scholar Raymond Head observes that the composer took care to avoid including any of the erotic elements from the original Sanskrit texts.

== Movements ==
Imogen Holst's listing of the work suggests a duration of approximately 38 minutes. It is performed in the following sequence:

1. Prelude
2. O thou, who com'st from Heaven's king
3. In the city of the Great God
4. Bringer of rain
5. Rushing northward
6. See how all greet thee
7. Behold the villages
8. As the rain descends
9. Tarry not, O cloud, tarry not
10. Tarry not, O cloud
11. And hark!
12. Thou hast reached the snowy peaks
13. And see! The Great God himself
14. Chorus (Moderato maestoso)
15. When the dancers are weary
16. Wait near her flower-covered window
17. The Message (I, the bringer of the rain)
18. 'Beloved!'

== Holst's Indian period ==
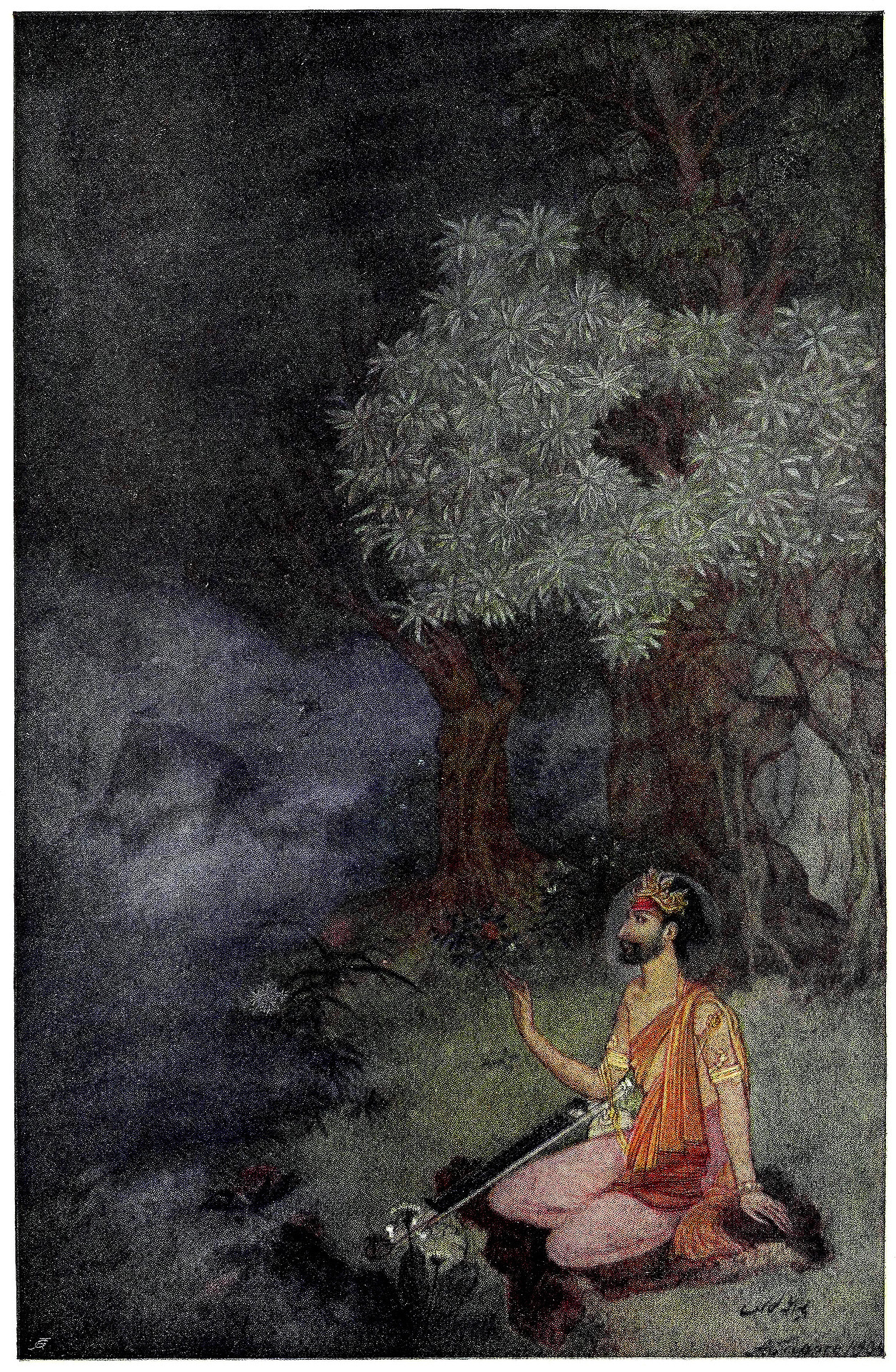
The Banished Yaksha, a painting by Abanindranath Tagore c. 1905.

As a young man, Holst became interested in Hindu philosophy, and in 1899 studied Sanskrit literature at University College in London. Holst drew inspiration from the Hindu tradition a number of times, with notable examples being, along with this work, Hymns from the Rig Veda, and the opera Sāvitri.

In 1919, writing in The Musical Times, Edwin Evans, when reviewing the composer's ongoing development, described this as Holst's 'Sanskrit' period. In the 1980s, in Holst and India: 'Maya' to 'Sita', Raymond Head described it as Holst's 'Indian' period.

During this period, musicologist Nalini Ghuman sees a clear influence of the Indian classical music tradition on Holst's use of harmony, texture and mode. In her book, Resonances of the Raj, she provides examples of how he drew upon elements such as the ālāp and rāga.

Ethnomusicologist Martin Clayton says that at least one Holst biographer was reluctant to acknowledge that the composer had been directly influenced by Indian music. Clayton says that Holst could have heard it being played by visiting musicians, or through his association with the violinist Maud Mann, an authority on the subject.

Imogen Holst suggested that her father studied Sanskrit with academic Mabel Bode in the late 1890s. However, Raymond Head believes this took place during the period 1899–1905, and that he studied the literature, rather than the language itself.

The Upanishads was one of a small number of books that Holst kept with him for his whole life. According to Imogen Holst, her father began exploring Indian culture and history after reading the book Silent Gods and Sun Steeped Lands by R. W. Frazer.

== Recordings ==
Performers	Year	Label
Della Jones, contralto; London Symphony Chorus; London Symphony Orchestra; Richard Hickox, conductor.	1990	Chandos
(Adapted for chamber ensemble) Caitlin Goreing, alto; King's College London Chapel Choir; The Strand Ensemble; Joseph Fort, arranger & conductor.	2020	Delphian

Sources: WorldCat and Apple Classical

== Score ==
The Cloud Messenger at IMSLP Petrucci Music Library
