= Govindabhatta =

Govinda-bhaṭṭa, known by his pen name Akbariya Kālidāsa ("Kalidasa of Akbar"), was a 16th-century Sanskrit-language court poet from present-day India. His patrons included Rewa's ruler Ramachandra and the Mughal emperor Akbar.

== Works ==
The texts attributed to Govindabhatta include:

- Akabari-vilasa
- Birudavali
- Ramachandra-yashah-prabandha, a panegyric on Ramachandra of Rewa
- Stutimalika

Govindabhatta appears to have become quite popular, as his verses appear in at least six anthologies of the 17th and the 18th centuries. The texts that cite his verses include Subhashita-haravali (c. 1650), Padyamrta-tarangini (c. 1673), Rasika-jivana (later than c. 1735), Sundaradeva's Sukti-Sundara, Padyareni, and Padyarchana.

Most of Govindabhatta's extant verses are devoted to description and praise of kings. The kings praised by him include Akbar (whom he calls Kabilendra or Jallaladin) and Ramachandra of Rewa (whom he calls Vaghela). He may have adopted the pen-name "Akbariya Kalidasa" to please Emperor Akbar.

In his poems, Govindabhatta pays homage to the gods Vishnu, Shiva, Bhavani, Ganesha, Krishna, Durga, and Jvalapa (Jvalamukhi).

== See also ==
- Tansen, another courtier of Akbar originally in service of Ramachandra
