= Sāsanavaṃsa =

Book by Paññasāmī

Sāsana Vaṃsa
- Author: Paññāsāmi
- Original title: သာသနာဝင် Thathanawin
- Language: Burmese
- Series: Burmese chronicles
- Genre: Chronicle, Buddhist literature
- Publisher: King Mindon
- Publication date: 1861
- Publication place: Kingdom of Burma

The Sāsanavaṃsa or Thathanawin (Burmese: သာသနာဝင်, pronounced [θàðənà wɪ̀ɰ̃]) is a history of the Buddhist order in Burma, composed by the Burmese monk Paññāsāmi in 1861. It is written in Pali prose, and based on earlier documents in Pali and Burmese, still extant, but which had not been edited at the end of the nineteenth century.

The earlier part of the work deals with the history of Buddhism outside of Burma. This is based on the Mahavamsa, and other well-known Sri Lankan works, and has no independent value. The latter part of the work, about three-fifths of the whole, deals with Buddhism in Burma, and contains information not obtainable elsewhere. Up to the 11th century the Sasana Vamsa is mythical or legendary. After that date it is sober, intelligible and in all probability accurate. This portion occupies about one hundred pages (eight volumes) in the excellent edition of the text prepared by the Pali Text Society in 1897 by Dr. Mabel Bode. It shows a continuous literary effort through the eight and a half centuries, and constantly renewed ecclesiastical controversy. The latter is concerned for the most part with minor questions relating to rules of the order, there being a tendency, as relaxations of the rules crept in with the lapse of time, to hark back to the original simplicity. Of differences in matters of doctrine there is no mention in this manual. Dr Bode has prefixed to her edition a detailed summary of the contents of the book.

The Dhammikarama Temple in Penang, Malaysia contains a Sasana Vamsa Sima Shrine Hall in honour of Bode's work.

N. R. Ray used Bode's edited Pali text as the main source for his 1946 Introduction to the Study of Theravāda Buddhism in Burma. B. C. Law in 1952 produced for the Pali Text Society an English translation of the Sāsanavaṃsa.

== Bibliography ==
- Aung-Thwin, Michael A. (2005). The Mists of Rāmañña: The Legend that was Lower Burma (illustrated ed.). Honolulu: University of Hawai'i Press. ISBN 9780824828868.
- Bischoff, Roger (1995). Buddhism in Myanmar-A Short History (PDF). Buddhist Publication Society. ISBN 955-24-0127-5.
- Charney, Michael W. (2006). Powerful Learning: Buddhist Literati and the Throne in Burma's Last Dynasty, 1752–1885. Ann Arbor: University of Michigan.
- Romanised Pali: Bode, Mable; Sāsanavaṃsa; 1897 (Pali Text Society), reprint 1996
- Engl.: History of the Buddha's religion (Sāsanavaṃsa); London 1952
