= Lachhmi Dhar Kalla =

Sanskrit scholar

Lachhmi Dhar Shastri Kalla was reader of Sanskrit at St. Stephen's College, the University of Delhi, and head of the Department of Sanskrit from 1922 to 1949.

== Works ==
- The Home of the Aryas: With Notes, References and Appendices, 1930, University of Delhi (2002), ISBN 978-81-85695-32-7
- The birthplace of Kalidasa: With notes, references, and appendices, etc.
- All-India Kashmiri Pandit social reform movement: An appeal for social reform among the Kashmiris : leading opinions of the members of the Kashmiri community, 1931
- The Vedic paddhati: As current among the Kashmiri Pandits, 1932
