= Ralph T. H. Griffith =

English Indologist

Ralph Thomas Hotchkin Griffith (25 May 1826 – 7 November 1906) was an English Indologist. He was a member of the Indian Education Service, and was among the first Europeans to translate the Vedas into English. He had lived in Oxford, Benares, and in Madras.

== Life ==
Griffith was born at Corsley, Wiltshire, on 25 May 1826. The son of the Reverend R. C. Griffith (Chaplain to the Marquess of Bath 1830), he was educated at Warminster School, Uppingham School, and Queen's College, Oxford, where he graduated BA and was elected Boden Professor of Sanskrit on Nov 24, 1849. The Boden Sanskrit professorship had been established in 1832 with money bequeathed to the university by Lieutenant Colonel Joseph Boden to assist in the conversion of the people of India to Christianity. Griffith took up this objective and translated the Vedic scriptures into English. He also produced translations of other Sanskrit literature, including a verse version of the Ramayana and the Kumara Sambhava of Kalidasa. He held the position of principal at the Benares College in India and later lived in Kotagiri, Nilgiri. Griffith was more interested in translating Vedic books into English, and did most of his translations while living, teaching and researching in Kotagiri in the Nilgiris.

His translation of the Rigveda follows the text of Max Müller's six-volume Sanskrit edition. His readings generally follow the work of the great scholar Sayana, who was Prime Minister at the court of the King of Vijaynagar in what is now the District of Bellary in the Indian state of Karnataka during the fourteenth century.

On his retirement he withdrew to Kotagiri, a hill station, some 7000 feet high, in the Nilgiris district, Madras, residing with his brother Frank, an engineer in the public works department of the Bombay presidency, who had settled there in 1879. At Kotagiri he tranquilly engaged in the study and translation of the Vedas. He died on 7 November 1906, and was buried there.

In the early twentieth century, the English composer Gustav Holst purchased Griffith's translations of the Rig Veda from Luzac & Co, a specialist London bookseller. Holst studied it closely, and drew upon it for his choral work, Hymns from the Rig Veda. The composer's copy of the work is now at St. Paul's Girls School.

== Works ==
Copies of his translation of the Rigveda, Samaveda, Yajur Veda, Atharvaveda and Ramayana are available on the internet.

- The Ramayan of Valmiki (published 1870) (read online)
- Hymns of the Rigveda (published 1889) (read online)
- Hymns of the Samaveda (published 1893) (read online)
- Hymns of the Atharvaveda (published 1896) (read online)
- The Texts of the White Yajurveda (published 1899) (read online)

== Bibliography ==
- This article incorporates text from a publication now in the public domain: Macdonell, Arthur Anthony (1912). "Griffith, Ralph Thomas Hotchkin". In Lee, Sidney (ed.). Dictionary of National Biography (2nd supplement). London: Smith, Elder & Co.
- A. A. Macdonell, rev. J. B. Katz. "Griffith, Ralph Thomas Hotchkin (1826–1906)". Oxford Dictionary of National Biography (online ed.). Oxford University Press. doi:10.1093/ref:odnb/33580. (Subscription, Wikipedia Library access or UK public library membership required.)
