= Ṛtusaṃhāra =

Lyric poem by Kālidāsa

Ṛtusaṃhāra, often written Ritusamhara, (Devanagari: ऋतुसंहार; ऋतु ṛtu, "season"; संहार saṃhāra, "compilation") is a medium length Sanskrit poem. The poem has six cantos – one for each of the six Indian seasons, which are Grīṣhma (Summer), Varṣā (Monsoon), Śāradā (Autumn), Hemanta (Early winter), Śiśira (Winter) and Vasanta (Spring).

The poem opens with Summer, Grīṣhma, and concludes with Spring, Vasanta. An introductory note to R.S. Pandit's English translation (1947) explains that the poet's intention here is to "...wind up (a meal) with a sweet".

In 'Ṛtusaṃhāra', the word 'Ritu' (seasons) has been combined with the word 'saṃhāra', and is used here in the sense of "coming together" or "group". Thus, Ritusamhara has been translated as either Medley of Seasons, Garland of Seasons, or perhaps more aptly, the Pageant of the Seasons.

The poem was collated by William Jones and was the first Sanskrit text to be printed and published in Calcutta (Kolkata) in 1792.

== Attribution ==
The poem has traditionally been attributed to Kalidasa, but some scholars disagree. According to Siegfried Lienhard "the Ṛtusaṃhāra is almost certainly the work of some poet whose name has not come down to us and was probably written sometime between Asvaghosa (about 100 A.D.) and Kalidasa (4th to 5th century)."

Academics like V.V. Mirashi and N.R Navlekar conclude that Ritusamharam is indeed Kalidasa's work, albeit from his younger days.

M. Srinivasachariar and T. S. Narayana Sastri believe that works attributed to "Kālidāsa" are not by a single person. According to Srinivasachariar, writers from the 8th and 9th centuries hint at the existence of three noted literary figures who share the name Kālidāsa. Sastri lists the works of these three Kalidasas as follows:

1. The famous poet Kālidāsa (alias Medharudra); author of Kumārasambhavam, Meghadūtam and Raghuvaṃśam.
2. Kālidāsa (alias Kotijit); author of this work, Ṛtusaṃhāra, along with Śyāmala-Daṇḍakam, Śṛngāratilakam and others.
3. Kālidāsa (alias Mātṛgupta); author of Setu-Bandha and three plays (Abhijñānaśākuntalam, Mālavikāgnimitram and Vikramōrvaśīyam).

== Structure and style ==
The evocative poetry is in the popular Anustubh Chanda form of four line stanzas- a total of 144 stanzas. The changing seasons are portrayed in acute details using the thematic backdrop of how lovers react differently to the changing landscapes- the two themes beautifully accentuating each other. This imbues the poem with distinctly amorous taste (shringara) rasa. The predominant emphasis on a single rasa has been criticized by some, however it showcases the latent virtuosity of the neophyte poet, as he explores the range of flavors (Svad) within the single rasa rasa- an exuberant exposition of joie de vivre, conveyed through the interplay of changing nature and steady romance.

Sometimes Kalidasa's authorship has been challenged on the grounds of weak poetic imagination. As an example, here is verse 1.4 of Grishma, where the lovers are struggling against the heat:

To relieve their lovers of heat,
Women make them lie
On their girdled, round hips covered with silken robes, or
On their sandal anointed breasts
Heavy with ornaments.
They seek help from fragrant flowers
Set in coiffures after a bath,
To intoxicate and delight their lovers.

Of these verses (4-9 of Grishma canto) the Mysore scholar K. Krishnamurthy says:

The sensuality and cloying love depicted in these verses is such that it cannot bring fame to any poet.

However, others have cited the primacy of shringara rasa (considered as a primeval source for other rasas), and also the balance the poet seeks to achieve by setting the lovers against the background of nature, as redeeming features of the work.

Simple evocations of changing seasons intersperse the more colorful ones:

The summer scorched forest is thrilled with joy at the touch of new showers,
A new pleasure sprouts on the Kadamba trees,
and every branch shakes in a gaiety unexplained.
Every flower of Ketaki is blossomed
as if the forest has laughed.
And peacocks dance with a precipitate joy. (Canto 2)
Cooled by the touch of fresh drops of water,
And perfumed by the flower laden fragrant Lasak trees
Aye! scented sweet by the Ketaki pollen,
the pleasing wind enraptures the lovelorn women. (Canto 2)

Old Sanskrit texts' commentators like Mallinatha of 15th century ignored this work, along with dozens of other commentators. This has contributed to the doubts about the authorship of this work. But scholars like Keith argue that excepts from this work are quoted in several Sanskrit anthologies, hence it must be that commentators like Mallinatha didn't like simple works.

== Adaptations ==
Playwright and theatre director, Ratan Thiyam, stage his production based on the poem as closing production of 4th Bharat Rang Mahotsav in 2002.

In 1911, the English composer Gustav Holst adapted the texts for Spring and Summer from Ṛtusaṃhāra for his short choral work, Two Eastern Pictures.

== Translations ==
- Translated into English by R. S. Pandit, published in 1947.
- Translated into Tamil and published in 1950 by T. Sathasiva Iyer.
- Translated into Marathi Poetry by Dhananjay Borkar and published by Varada Prakashan in 2012. It has also been translated to Kannada by Bannanje Govindacharya titled "Rutugala henige".
- Simultaneously translated into Hindi and English, as well as illustrated by Rangeya Raghav, published by Atmaram and Sons in 1973.
- Ritusamharam A Gathering of Seasons translated to English by A.N.D Haksar, published in 2018, Penguin Classics

== See also ==
- Sanskrit literature
- Sanskrit drama
