= Shivram Mahadev Paranjape =

Marathi writer

- Born: 27 June 1864
- Died: 27 September 1929 (aged 65)
- Occupations: Writer, scholar, orator, journalist

Shivram Mahadev Paranjape (27 June 1864 – 27 September 1929) was a Marathi writer, scholar, orator, journalist and freedom fighter from Bombay Presidency. He created unrest among the people of Maharashtrian against British rule through his popular weekly Kaal (meaning "Times" in Marathi) from 1898 to 1908.

== Early life ==
Paranjape was born on 27 June 1864 in Mahad in Raigad district to a local practising advocate. After his primary education at Mahad, at 14 he attended secondary school in Raigad. He was highly impressed by his teacher Vishnushastri Krushnashastri Chiplunkar who had also inspired Lokmanya Tilak and Gopal Ganesh Agarkar to start their social and political career. In 1882 Paranjape moved to Pune to join New English School newly founded by Chiplunkar, Tilak and Agarkar. In 1884 he received the prestigious Jagannath Shankarsheth scholarship. In 1885 he spent his first year at Fergusson College moving to Deccan College to finish his B.A. In 1895 he received his M.A. from Bombay University.

== Political career ==
After receiving his master's degree, Paranjape joined Maharashtra College as Sanskrit professor. Simultaneously, he started giving lectures on the current political and social situation and became instantly popular due to his particular sarcastic style of presentation. As a follower of Tilak he also participated in many socio-political events like 'Shiva Jayanti' and 'Ganesh Utsav' which ultimately compelled him to resign from his college job. In 1898 he founded a weekly called Kaal (काळ), which eventually would have two meanings in Marathi; the first would be 'Times' and the other 'Terminator'. His fiery editorials and humorous and sarcastic style of writing started making the younger generation furious with anger against the British rule. Kaal continued to be a popular weekly even sometimes surpassing Tilak' Weekly Kesari until Paranjape was arrested in 1908. British authorities convicted him of “sedition” and sentenced him to nineteen months of imprisonment with hard labor. In 1910, when he was set free, British authorities banned the publication of Kaal and also confiscated collections of his past essays and editorials in the weekly. Paranjape decided to take a break and turn to literature.

== Literary work ==
Paranjape wrote over one thousand political and social essays and critiques; short stories; novels; and plays. He was elected president of the Marathi Sahitya Sammelan (All India Marathi Meet) held at Belgaum in 1929. His works include the following :

- काळातील निबंध (Collections of essays - 11 Volumes)
- मानाजीराव (Play)
- पहिला पांडव (Play)
- विंध्याचल (Novel)
- गोविंदाची गोष्ट (Novel)

== Some of his quotes ==
- A Paris (Philosopher's stone) must be the reality considering that the land of England in the past was having nothing but a huge stock of iron-ore. But after it came into contact with India, iron-ore turned into gold.
- If the king owes something to the people, then let the people themselves decide the ways and means to recover the dues.
- Can't help when some oxen sincerely feel that their necks are safe under the yoke and some insects prefer to live happily in the dirt.
- ‘Chalval’ (Movement) is the wrong word being used for ‘agitation’ as it does not indicate even a slightly swift, speedy kind of action. However, for a half-dead country like ours it coincidentally suits.
- Whatever is decided in the Indian Congress meet for communicating to the British Government should not be regarded as “Resolutions” but in fact the “beggars’ cry for the alms".
- Alas ! Had I have enough courage to drink liquor every day, I could have claimed myself to be a Sudharak (Reformer).

== Later life ==
Paranjape again became active in politics during 1920 after the emergence of M.K. Gandhi on the Indian political orbit. In 1922, British authorities imprisoned Paranjape for six months for participation in a satyagraha at Mulshi under the leadership of Gandhi to oppose the proposed Mulshi Dam. In 1927, he became President of the Maharashtra branch of the Indian Independence League formed by Jawaharlal Nehru, Subhashchandra Bose and Shrinivas Ayyangar. He suffered from diabetes for many years and died on 27 September 1929.
