= Kalidasa =

Classical Sanskrit poet and playwright (4th–5th centuries CE)

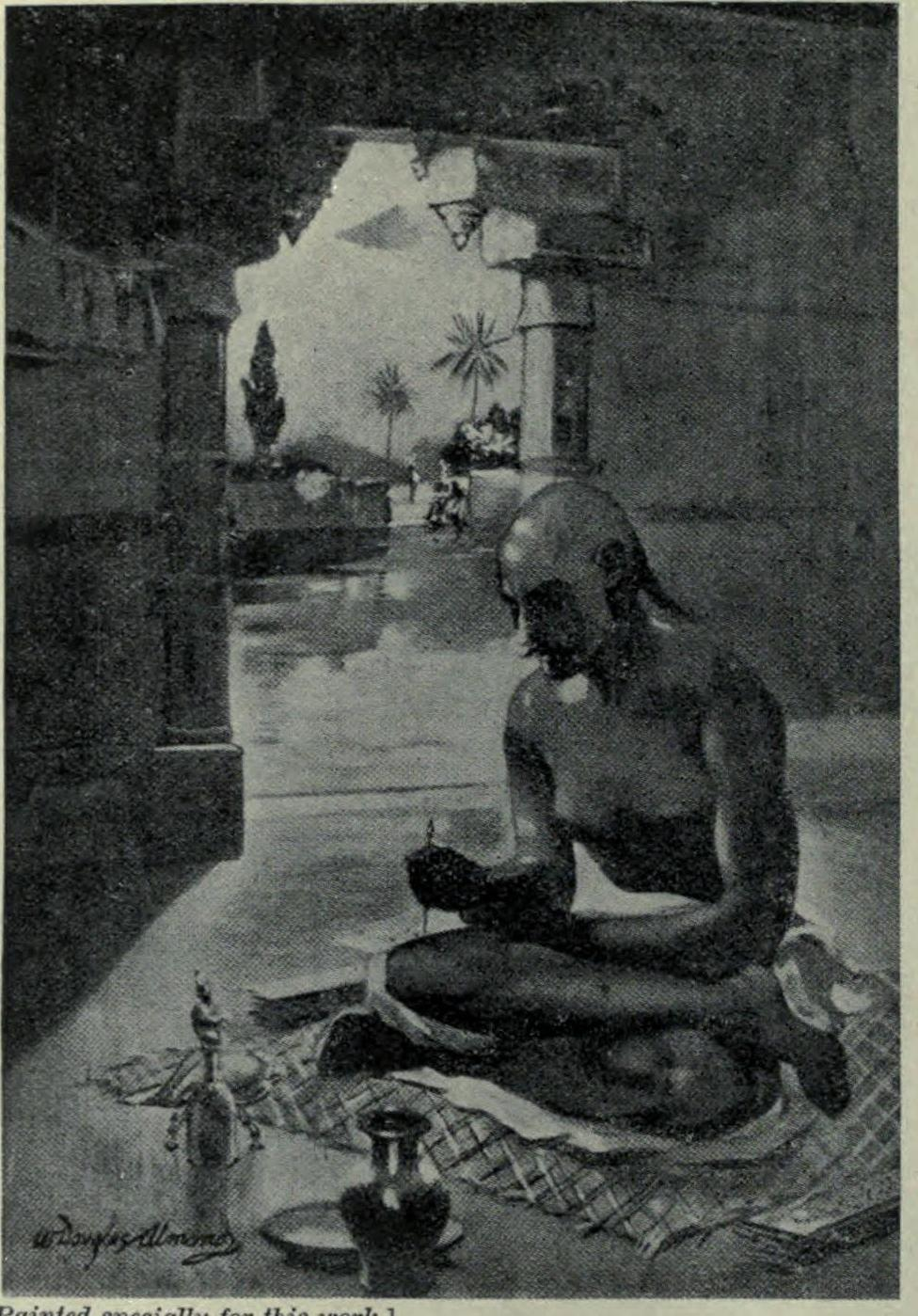
- A 20th-century artist's impression of Kālidāsa composing the Meghadūta
- Occupations: Poet, Dramatist
- Writing career
- Language: Sanskrit, Prakrit
- Period: c. 4th-5th century CE
- Genres: Sanskrit drama, Classical literature
- Subjects: Epic poetry, Puranas
- Notable works: Kumārasambhavam, Abhijñānaśākuntalam, Raghuvaṃśa, Meghadūta, Vikramōrvaśīyam, Mālavikāgnimitram

Kālidāsa (Sanskrit: कालिदास, "Servant of Kali"; 4th–5th century CE) was a Classical Sanskrit author who is often considered ancient India's greatest poet and playwright. His plays and poetry are primarily based on Hindu Puranas and philosophy. His surviving works consist of three plays, two epic poems and two shorter poems.

== Legend ==
Kalidasa was once a simple cowherd. Ridiculed as a dimwit, he was tricked into marrying a smart princess; some versions say she was the princess of Kalinga (roughly present-day coastal Orissa), and others, of Ujjayinī (present-day Ujjain). However, very soon after their marriage, she realized that her husband was, in fact, a complete fool, entirely devoid of any learning.

Unable to bear his wife’s mockery, Kalidasa left home and headed straight for a temple of Goddess Kali (Bhadrakāli).

It was well known that if any human ventured there at night, one of two things would happen: either the Goddess’s attendants—the bhutas—would tear the intruder to pieces, or the Goddess herself might be pleased and grant a blessing. Kalidasa went there, prepared for whatever might come. Upon his arrival, he found that the Goddess was away, and the temple stood open. A fool as he was, Kalidasa entered, closed the door, bolted it from the inside, and sat down.

After a while, the Goddess returned. Finding the temple locked, she asked, "Who is inside?" Without opening the door, Kalidasa boldly replied, "Who is outside?" Since it was essential for her to enter before the arrival of other humans, the Goddess hurriedly answered, "Kali is outside." Kalidasa immediately replied, "Then, your *dāsa* (servant) is inside." Pleased by this, the Goddess said, "Kālidāsā! What do you desire? Open the door." Hearing this, Kalidasa replied, "It is vidyā (knowledge) that I seek. I shall not open the door unless you grant me that." The Goddess then instructed, "Stick your tongue out through the gap in the door." As Kalidasa complied, the Goddess used her shula (trident)—or, by some accounts, her fingernails—to inscribe the Chintāmani Mantra—a mantra that bestows profound wisdom—upon his tongue. Instantly, the impurities obscuring Kalidasa’s intellect vanished, much like clouds parting to reveal the clear, radiant light of the moon; he was transformed into a great scholar and a supreme poet.

Kalidasa immediately opened the door, approached the Goddess, and—reciting verses composed on the spot—prostrated himself at her feet. (The hymn Shyamala Dandakam, composed by Kalidasa in praise of the Goddess, is said to have originated from this moment.) The Goddess then returned to the inner sanctum of the temple and resumed her original form. Kalidasa offered his salutations once more before departing. It was when the Goddess, pleased with him, called out, "Kalidasa!" that he came to be known by that name; prior to this, he had been called by a different name.

Upon returning home, having attained profound scholarship through the grace of Kali, his wife asked him, "Asti kaścit vāgarthah?" ("have you attained true, manifest wisdom?"). Kalidasa expressed his deep regard for his wife by incorporating these very words at the beginning of three of his literary works. These works begin with these three terms. Kumārasambhava starts with the word asti ("astyuttarasyām..."), Meghadūta with kaścit ("kaścit kāntāvirahaguruṇā..."), and Raghuvamśa with vāgarthah ("vāgarthāviva sampṛktau...").

== Biography ==
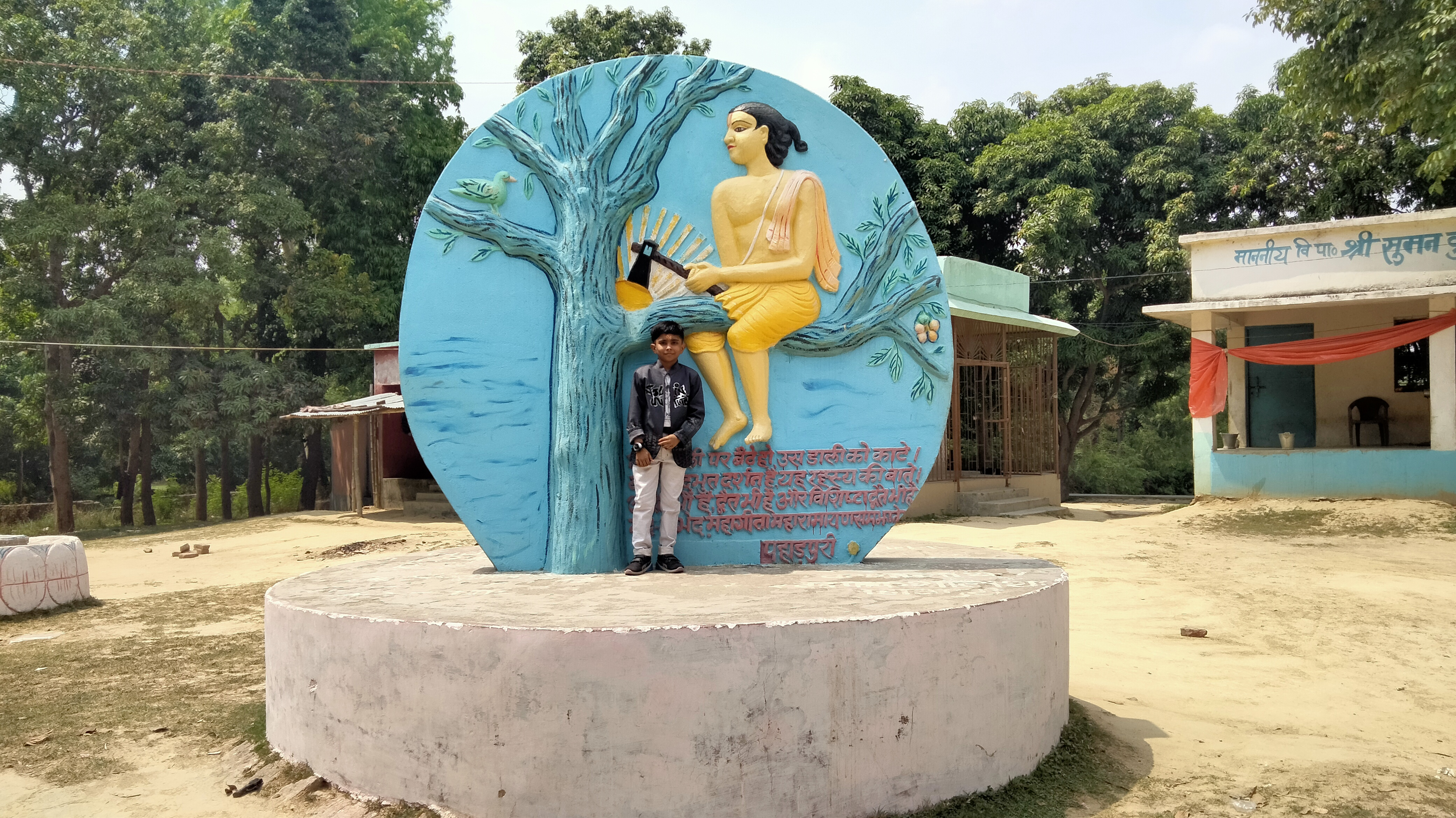
Artistic statue of Kalidasa at the premises of the Kalidas Dih in Uchchaith village of the Mithila region in India.

Little is known about Kalidasa's life, except what is inferred from his poetry and plays. His works cannot be dated with precision, but they were most likely authored before the 5th century CE during the Gupta era.

=== Birthplace ===
Based on geographical descriptions found in Kalidasa's works, various theories have been put forward placing his birthplace in Bengal, Kashmir, Vidarbha, and Malava (Dashapura, Vidisha, or Ujjayini).

Historian V. V. Mirashi argues that Kalidasa's description of Ujjayini shows his "longing, admiration and love" for the city, which suggests that it was his birthplace. For example, in the Meghaduta, Kalidasa asks the cloud not to miss Ujjayini on his way to the mythical city of Alaka, even if it had to take a detour. According to Mirashi, except Alaka, the poet has not described any other city "at so much length and with such enthusiasm of joy and affection".

Lachhmi Dhar Kalla (1891–1953), a Sanskrit scholar and a Kashmiri Pandit, presents Kashmir as the birthplace of Kalidasa, in his book The birth-place of Kalidasa (1926). According to Kalla, Kalidasa's works suggest that he was deeply familiar with the Himalayas, and refer to some customs and superstitions unique to Kashmir. Kalla asserts that Kalidasa mentions some sites that can be identified with places in Kashmir, and were not very famous outside Kashmir. Further, Kalidasa's works mention plants (such as saffron and deodar), animals (such as musk deer), and geographical features (such as tarns and glades) characteristic of Kashmir. Kalla also states that the character Śakuntalā is an allegorical dramatisation of Pratyabhijna philosophy (a branch of Kashmir Shaivism). Kalla states that Kalidasa refers to certain legends of Kashmiri origin; for example, in the Raghuvamsha, a lion describes himself as a friend of "Nikumbha", who according to Kalla is same as a mythical being mentioned in the Nilamata Purana of Kashmir. According to Kalla, the Huna incursions in Kashmir forced Kalidasa to migrated southwards and seek royal patronage in Ujjayini.

Mirashi dismisses Kalla's theory, stating that Kalidasa's works show his familiarity with all parts of India, not just Kashmir. He further argues that the Nilamata Purana was written after Kalidasa, and takes names of places and persons from Kalidasa's works. Mirashi also disputes Kalla's association of various sites, customs and philosophy mentioned in Kalidasa's works with Kashmir. He argues that the Hunas invaded Kashmir only in the 6th century, while Kalidasa lived during the 4th and the 5th centuries. Most importantly, Mirashi notes that Kalhana's Rajatarangini does not mention Kalidasa among the famous literary figures of Kashmir.

Some scholars, such as Hara Prasad Shastri and S. M. Paranjape, believe that Kalidasa may have attended the court of the 6th century king Yashodharman in central India. Shastri believes that Kalidasa was from Dashapura (modern Mandsaur), while Paranjape believes that he may have been from Vidisha. They argue that Kalidasa's works refer to "the most insignificant hillocks and rivulets" in central India. Mirashi dismisses this theory, stating that Kalidasa lived in the preceding centuries, and that his description of Dashapura and Vidisha do not suggest that he spent his early life there.

Indologist Peter Peterson theorizes that Kalidasa was from Vidarbha, based on his use of the Vaidarbhi style and the characters such as Malavika and Indumati (both princesses of Vidarbha). Mirashi dismisses these evidences as insufficient, and notes that the Vaidarbhi ("of Vidarbhi") style is not unique to literary figures from Vidarbha.

The theory about Bengal being the birthplace of Kalidasa is based on several legends, which Mirashi dismisses as unreliable old wives' tales. Another argument is that the name Kalidasa means a servant of the goddess Kali, whose worship is very popular in Bengal. Mirashi points out that Kalidasa's invocatory verses are all addressed to the god Shiva, and Kali is mentioned only once in Kumara-sambhava. Moreover, historical evidence suggests that during the 4th and the 5th centuries, Kali worship was prevalant in the Malava region, where Ujjayini - believed by Mirashi to be Kalidasa's birthplace - is located. Mirashi also points out that Kalidasa refers to Bengal only once in his writings, when he mentions Vanga while describing king Raghu's conquest of the world.

People of Kaviltha, a village in the Rudraprayag district of Uttarakhand, claim that their village is the birthplace of Kalidasa and believe themselves to be his descendents. A festival dedicated to the poet is organized in Kaviltha every year. The Kalidas Janma Bhumi Smarak Samiti ("Kalidasa Birthplace Memorial Committee") was established in 1973 in the village.

In the Mithila region of Bihar, the birthplace of Kalidasa is believed to be the Kalidas Dih in the Uchhaith village of Madhubani district.

=== Life ===
Several ancient and medieval books state that Kālidāsa was a court poet of a king named Vikramāditya. A legendary king named Vikramāditya is said to have ruled from Ujjain around the 1st century BCE. A section of scholars believe that this legendary Vikramāditya is not a historical figure at all. There are other kings who ruled from Ujjain and adopted the title Vikramāditya, the most notable ones being Chandragupta II (r. 380 CE – 415 CE) and Yaśodharman (6th century CE).

The most popular theory is that Kālidāsa flourished during the reign of Chandragupta II, and therefore lived around the 4th-5th century CE. Several Western scholars have supported this theory, since the days of William Jones and A. B. Keith. Modern western Indologists and scholars like Stanley Wolpert also support this theory. Many Indian scholars, such as Vasudev Vishnu Mirashi and Rāma Gupta, also place Kālidāsa in this period. According to this theory, his career might have extended to the reign of Kumāragupta I (r. 414 – 455 CE), and possibly, to that of Skandagupta (r. 455 – 467 CE).

The earliest paleographical evidence of Kālidāsa is found in a Sanskrit inscription dated c. 473 CE, found at Mandsaur's Sun temple, with some verses that appear to imitate Meghadūtam Purva, 66; and the Ṛtusaṃhāra V, 2–3, although Kālidāsa is not named. His name, along with that of the poet Bhāravi, is first mentioned the 634 CE Aihole inscription found in Karnataka.

== Works ==
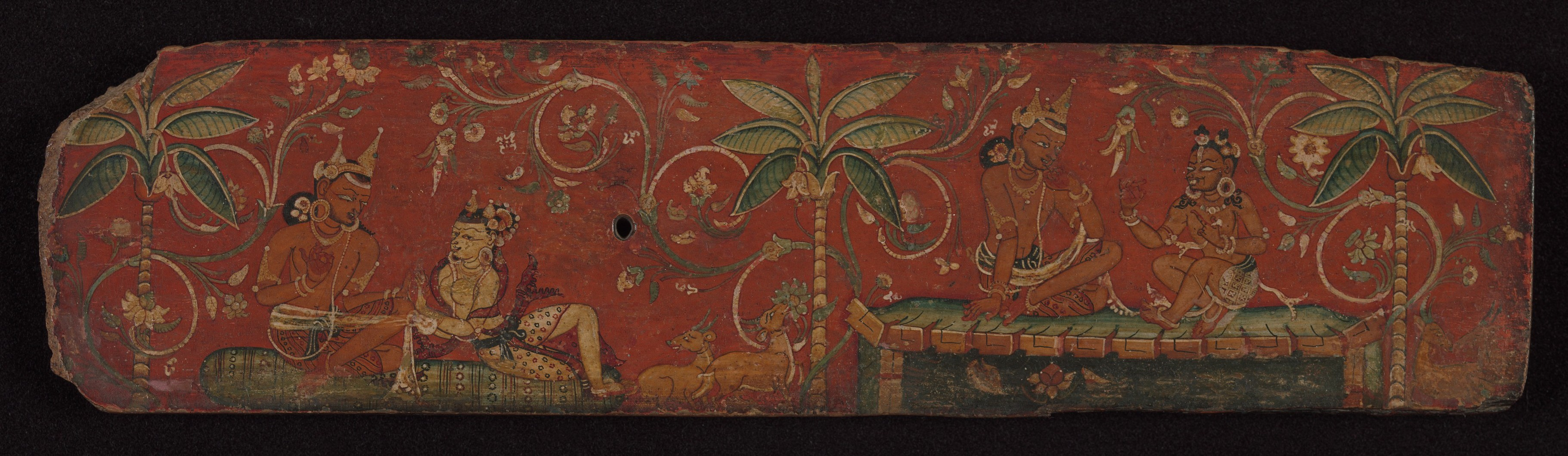
Palm-leaf manuscript cover illustrated with scenes from Kalidasa’s Shakuntala play, circa 12th century.

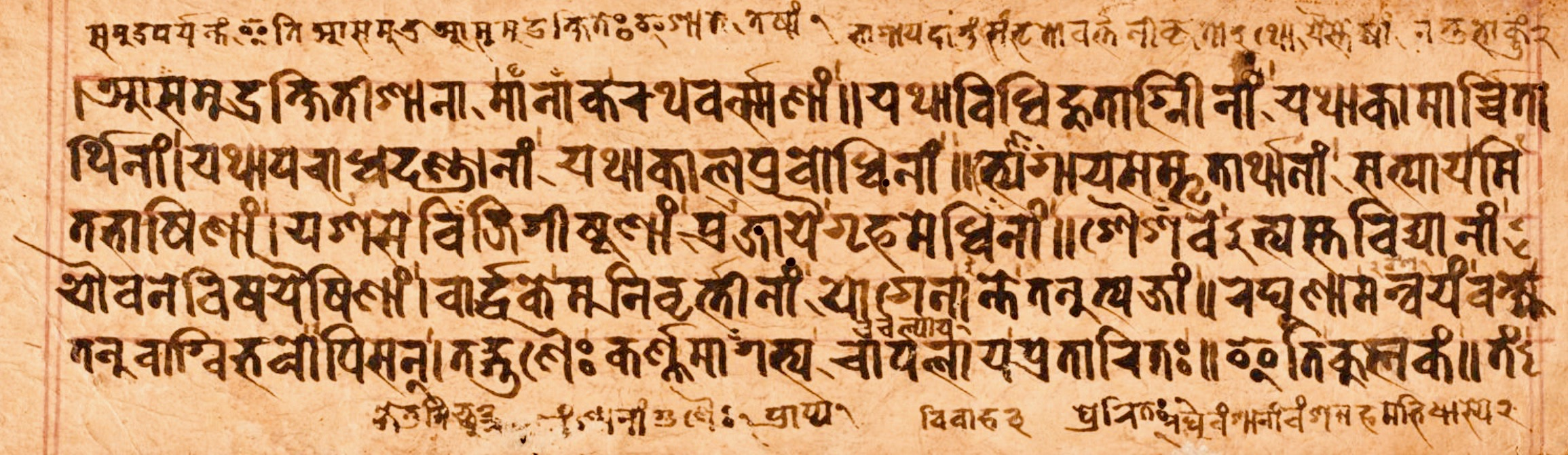
17th-century manuscript copy of Kalidasa's Raghuvamsa.

A large number of Sanskrit works are attributed to Kalidasa, but based on literary analysis, most modern scholars believe that only the following works can be attributed to him:

- Two epics (mahakavyas): Kumārasambhava and Raghuvaṃśa
- Two lyric poems: Meghadūta and Ṛtusaṃhāra
- Three plays: Abhijñāna-śākuntala, Mālavikāgnimitra, and Vikramorvaśīya.

Some scholars, including M. Srinivasachariar and T. S. Narayana Sastri, believe that even these works were not composed by a single person. According to Srinivasachariar, writers from 8th and 9th centuries hint at the existence of three noted literary figures who share the name Kālidāsa. These writers include Devendra (author of Kavi-Kalpa-Latā), Rājaśekhara and Abhinanda. Sastri lists the works of these three Kalidasas as follows:

1. Kālidāsa alias Mātṛgupta, author of Setu-Bandha and three plays
2. Kālidāsa alias Medharudra, author of Kumārasambhava, Meghadūta and Raghuvaṃśa.
3. Kālidāsa alias Kotijit: author of Ṛtusaṃhāra, Śyāmala-Daṇḍakam and Śṛngāratilakam among other works.

Sastri goes on to mention six other literary figures known by the name "Kālidāsa": Parimala Kālidāsa alias Padmagupta (author of Navasāhasāṅka Carita), Kālidāsa alias Yamakakavi (author of Nalodaya), Nava Kālidāsa (author of Champu Bhāgavata), Akbariya Kalidasa (author of several samasyas or riddles), Kālidāsa VIII (author of Lambodara Prahasana), and Abhinava Kālidāsa alias Mādhava (author of Saṅkṣepa-Śaṅkara-Vijayam).

According to K. Krishnamoorthy, "Vikramāditya" and "Kālidāsa" were used as common nouns to describe any patron king and any court poet, respectively.

=== Epic poems (Mahākāvya) ===
Kālidāsa is the author of two mahākāvyas, Kumārasambhavam (here 'Kumāra' meaning Kartikeya, and 'Sambhavam' meaning possibility of an event taking place, in this context a birth. Kumārasambhavam thus means the birth of a Kartikeya) and Raghuvaṃśam ("Dynasty of Raghu").

- Kumārasambhava describes the birth and adolescence of the goddess Pārvatī, her marriage to Śiva and the subsequent birth of their son Kumāra (Kārtikeya).
- Raghuvaṃśa is an epic poem about the kings of the Raghu dynasty.

=== Minor poems (Khaṇḍakāvya) ===
Kālidāsa also wrote the Meghadūtam (The Cloud Messenger), a khaṇḍakāvya (minor poem). It describes the story of a Yakṣa trying to send a message to his lover through a cloud. Kālidāsa set this poem to the mandākrāntā metre, which is known for its lyrical sweetness. It is one of Kālidāsa's most popular poems and numerous commentaries on the work have been written.

=== Plays ===
Kālidāsa wrote three plays. Among them, Abhijñānaśākuntalam ("Of the recognition of Śakuntalā") is generally regarded as a masterpiece. It was among the first Sanskrit works to be translated into English, and has since been translated into many languages.

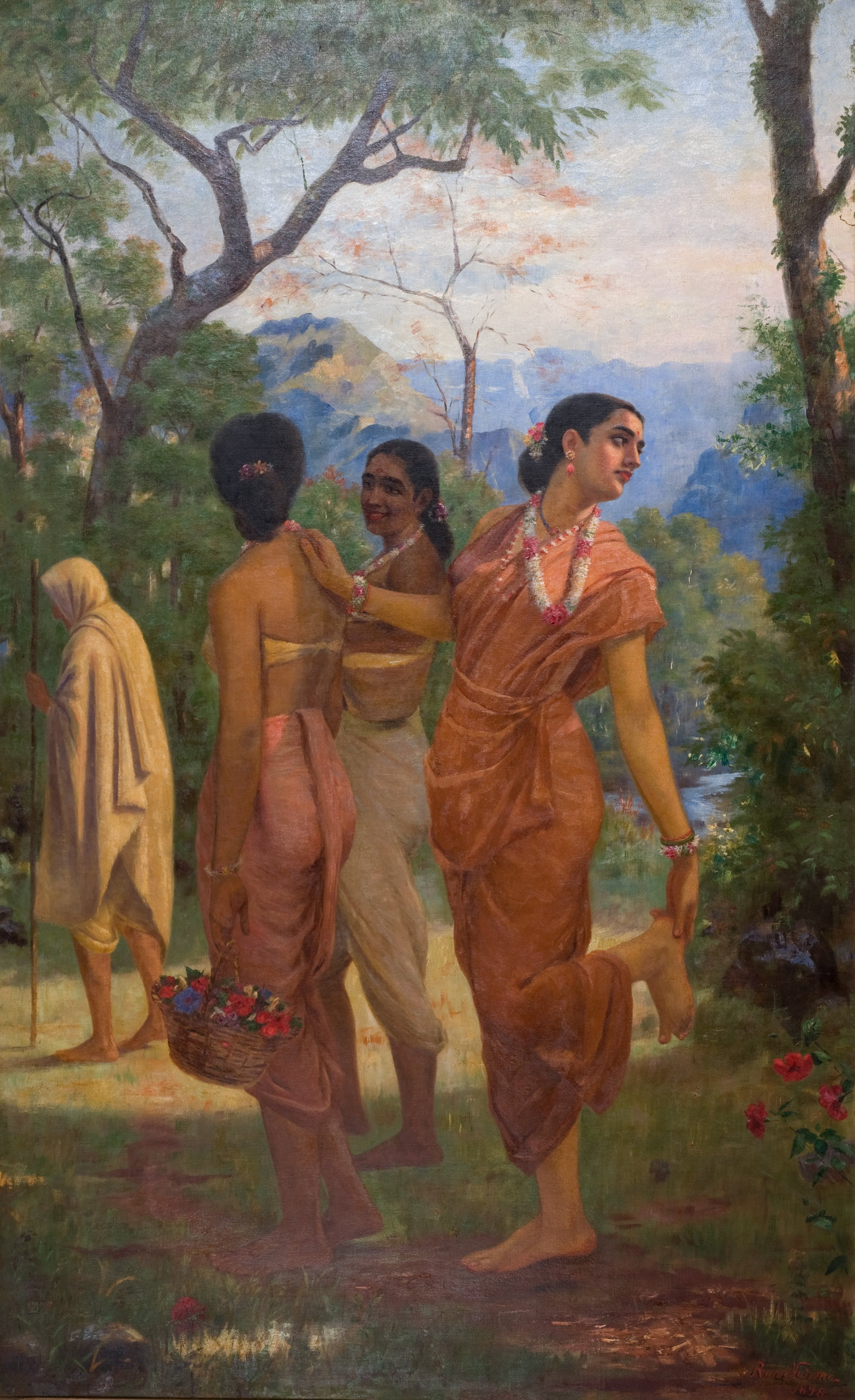
Śakuntalā stops to look back at Duṣyanta, by Raja Ravi Varma (1848–1906).

- Mālavikāgnimitram (Pertaining to Mālavikā and Agnimitra) tells the story of King Agnimitra, who falls in love with the picture of an exiled servant girl named Mālavikā. When the queen discovers her husband's passion for this girl, she becomes infuriated and has Mālavikā imprisoned, but as fate would have it, Mālavikā is in fact a true-born princess, thus legitimising the affair.
- Abhijñānaśākuntalam (Of the recognition of Śakuntalā) tells the story of King Duṣyanta who, while on a hunting trip, meets Śakuntalā, the adopted daughter of the sage Kanha and real daughter of Vishwamitra and Menaka and marries her. A mishap befalls them when he is summoned back to court: Śakuntala, pregnant with their child, inadvertently offends a visiting Durvasa and incurs a curse, whereby Duṣyanta forgets her entirely until he sees the ring he has left with her. On her trip to Duṣyanta's court in an advanced state of pregnancy, she loses the ring, and has to come away unrecognised by him. The ring is found by a fisherman who recognises the royal seal and returns it to Duṣyanta, who regains his memory of Śakuntala and sets out to find her. Goethe was fascinated by Kālidāsa's Abhijñānaśākuntalam, which became known in Europe, after being translated from English to German.
- Vikramōrvaśīyam (Ūrvaśī Won by Valour) tells the story of King Pururavas and celestial nymph Ūrvaśī who fall in love. As an immortal, she has to return to the heavens, where an unfortunate accident causes her to be sent back to the earth as a mortal with the curse that she will die (and thus return to heaven) the moment her lover lays his eyes on the child which she will bear him. After a series of mishaps, including Ūrvaśī's temporary transformation into a vine, the curse is lifted, and the lovers are allowed to remain together on the earth.

==== Translations ====
Montgomery Schuyler, Jr. published a bibliography of the editions and translations of the drama Śakuntalā while preparing his work "Bibliography of the Sanskrit Drama". (Note: It was later published as the third volume of the 13-volume Columbia University Indo-Iranian Series, published by the Columbia University Press in 1901-32 and edited by A. V. Williams Jackson.) Schuyler later completed his bibliography series of the dramatic works of Kālidāsa by compiling bibliographies of the editions and translations of Vikramōrvaśīyam and Mālavikāgnimitram. Sir William Jones published an English translation of Śakuntalā in 1791 CE and Ṛtusaṃhāra was published by him in original text during 1792 CE.

=== False attributions and false Kalidasas ===
According to Indologist Siegfried Lienhard:

A large number of long and short poems have incorrectly been attributed to Kalidasa, for instance the Bhramarastaka, the Ghatakarpara, the Mangalastaka, the Nalodaya (a work by Ravideva), the Puspabanavilasa, which is sometimes also ascribed to Vararuci or Ravideva, the Raksasakavya, the Rtusamhara, the Sarasvatistotra, the Srngararasastaka, the Srngaratilaka, the Syamaladandaka and the short, didactic text on prosody, the Srutabodha, otherwise thought to be by Vararuci or the Jaina Ajitasena. In addition to the non-authentic works, there are also some "false" Kalidasas. Immensely proud of their poetic achievement, several later poets have either been barefaced enough to call themselves Kalidasa or have invented pseudonyms such as Nava-Kalidasa, "New Kalidasa", Akbariya-Kalidasa, "Akbar-Kalidasa", etc.

== Legends ==
According to a popular legend, Kalidasa was an illiterate or mentally challenged shepherd who became a genius poet after being blessed by the goddess Kali, resulting in the name Kali-dasa (servant of goddess Kali).

Another old legend recounts that Kālidāsa visits Kumāradāsa, the king of Lanka and, because of treachery, is murdered there.

== Influence ==
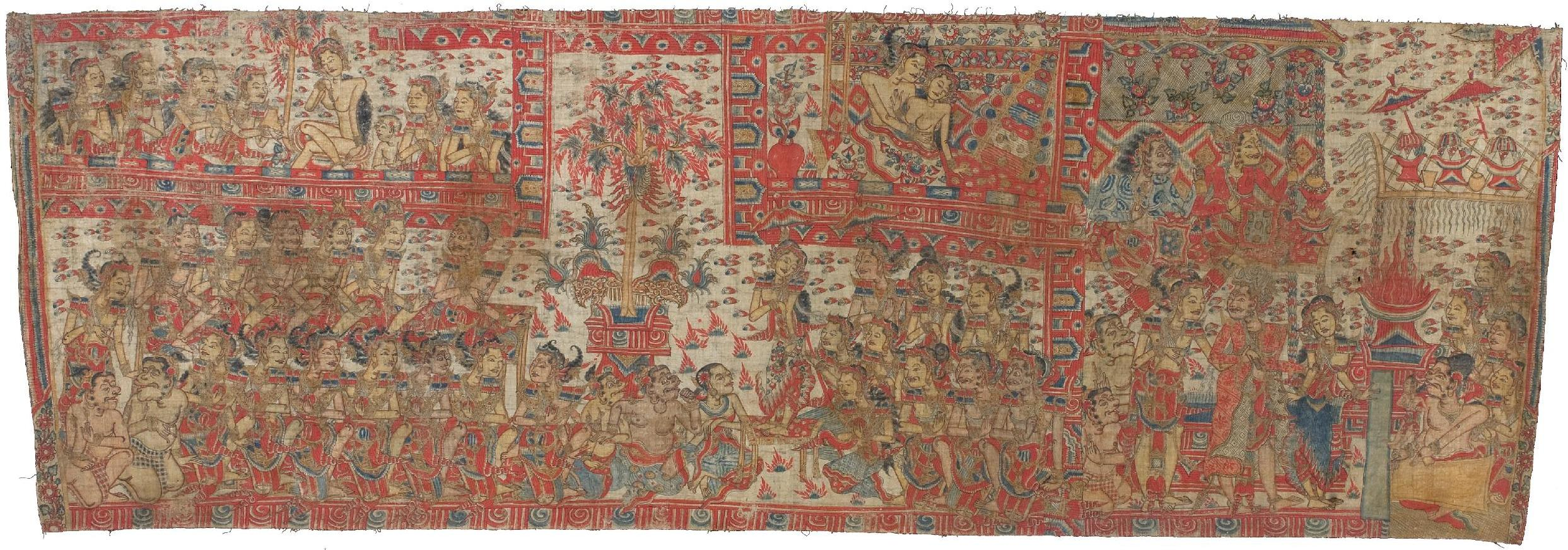
Sumanasāntaka written by the East Javanese court poet Mpu Monaguṇa in 13th century is a rendering of Kālidāsa's Raghuvaṃśa. Hanging textile, ca. 1833.

Kālidāsa's influence extends to all later Sanskrit works that followed him, and on Indian literature broadly, becoming an archetype of Sanskrit literature. He is mentioned as one of the seven Brahma avatars in Dasam Granth, written by Guru Gobind Singh. Notably in modern Indian literature Meghadūta's romanticism is found in Rabindranath Tagore's poems on the monsoons

The Sumanasāntaka is an epic Old Javanese kakawin (poem) written in the early 13th century by the East Javanese court poet Mpu Monaguṇa. Meaning "Death by a Sumanasa Flower," it is a localized, vernacular adaptation of the 5th-century Sanskrit poem Raghuvaṃśa by Kālidāsa. The narrative revolves around the romantic and tragic lives of Prince Aja and Princess Indumatī, with a heavy focus on the events surrounding their marriage. The poem is famous for its extensive length over 1,100 stanzas and its highly detailed, evocative descriptions of everyday life, religion, and the natural environment in 13th-century Java.

== Critical reputation ==
Bāṇabhaṭṭa, the 7th-century CE Sanskrit prose-writer and poet, has written: nirgatāsu na vā kasya kālidāsasya sūktiṣu, prītirmadhurasārdrāsu mañjarīṣviva jāyate. ("When Kālidāsa's sweet sayings, charming with sweet sentiment, went forth, who did not feel delight in them as in honey-laden flowers?").

Jayadeva, a later poet, has called Kālidāsa a kavikulaguru, 'the lord of poets' and the vilāsa, 'graceful play' of the muse of poetry.

The Indologist Sir Monier Williams has written: "No composition of Kālidāsa displays more the richness of his poetical genius, the exuberance of his imagination, the warmth and play of his fancy, his profound knowledge of the human heart, his delicate appreciation of its most refined and tender emotions, his familiarity with the workings and counterworkings of its conflicting feelings - in short more entitles him to rank as the Shakespeare of India."

Willst du die Blüthe des frühen, die Früchte des späteren Jahres,

Willst du, was reizt und entzückt, willst du was sättigt und nährt,
Willst du den Himmel, die Erde, mit Einem Namen begreifen;
Nenn’ ich, Sakuntala, Dich, und so ist Alles gesagt.

— Goethe

Wouldst thou the young year's blossoms and the fruits of its decline

And all by which the soul is charmed, enraptured, feasted, fed,
Wouldst thou the earth and heaven itself in one sole name combine?
I name thee, O Sakuntala! and all at once is said.

— translation by E. B. Eastwick

"Here the poet seems to be in the height of his talent in representation of the natural order, of the finest mode of life, of the purest moral endeavor, of the most worthy sovereign, and of the most sober divine meditation; still he remains in such a manner the lord and master of his creation."

— Goethe, quoted in Winternitz

Philosopher and linguist Humboldt writes, "Kālidāsa, the celebrated author of the Śākuntalā, is a masterly describer of the influence which Nature exercises upon the minds of lovers. Tenderness in the expression of feelings and richness of creative fancy have assigned to him his lofty place among the poets of all nations."

== Later culture ==
Many scholars have written commentaries on the works of Kālidāsa. Among the most studied commentaries are those by Kolāchala Mallinātha Suri, which were written in the 15th century during the reign of the Vijayanagara king, Deva Rāya II. The earliest surviving commentaries appear to be those of the 10th-century Kashmirian scholar Vallabhadeva. Eminent Sanskrit poets like Bāṇabhaṭṭa, Jayadeva and Rajasekhara have lavished praise on Kālidāsa in their tributes. A well-known Sanskrit verse ("Upamā Kālidāsasya...") praises his skill at upamā, or similes. Anandavardhana, a highly revered critic, considered Kālidāsa to be one of the greatest Sanskrit poets. Of the hundreds of pre-modern Sanskrit commentaries on Kālidāsa's works, only a fraction have been contemporarily published. Such commentaries show signs of Kālidāsa's poetry being changed from its original state through centuries of manual copying, and possibly through competing oral traditions which ran alongside the written tradition.

Kālidāsa's Abhijñānaśākuntalam was one of the first works of Indian literature to become known in Europe. It was first translated into English and then from English into German, where it was received with wonder and fascination by a group of eminent poets, which included Herder and Goethe.

Kālidāsa's work continued to evoke inspiration among the artistic circles of Europe during the late 19th century and early 20th century, as evidenced by Camille Claudel's sculpture Shakuntala.

Koodiyattam artist and Nāṭya Śāstra scholar Māni Mādhava Chākyār (1899–1990) of Kerala choreographed and performed popular Kālidāsa plays including Abhijñānaśākuntala, Vikramorvaśīya and Mālavikāgnimitra.

In 1910, the English classical composer Gustav Holst based his large-scale choral work, The Cloud Messenger upon Kalidasa's Meghadūta.

The Kannada films Mahakavi Kalidasa (1955), featuring Honnappa Bhagavatar, B. Saroja Devi and later Kaviratna Kalidasa (1983), featuring Rajkumar and Jaya Prada, were based on the life of Kālidāsa. Kaviratna Kalidasa also used Kālidāsa's Shakuntala as a sub-plot in the movie.V. Shantaram made the Hindi movie Stree (1961) based on Kālidāsa's Shakuntala. R.R. Chandran made the Tamil movie Mahakavi Kalidas (1966) based on Kālidāsa's life. Chevalier Nadigar Thilagam Sivaji Ganesan played the part of the poet himself. Mahakavi Kalidasu (Telugu, 1960) featuring Akkineni Nageswara Rao was similarly based on Kālidāsa's life and work.

Sharadindu Bandyopadhyay's Bengali novel Kumarsambhaber Kobi is a fictional biography on Kalidasa.

Surendra Verma's Hindi play Athavan Sarga, published in 1976, is based on the legend that Kālidāsa could not complete his epic Kumārasambhava because he was cursed by the goddess Pārvatī, for obscene descriptions of her conjugal life with Śiva in the eighth canto. The play depicts Kālidāsa as a court poet of Chandragupta who faces a trial on the insistence of a priest and some other moralists of his time.

Asti Kashchid Vagarthiyam is a five-act Sanskrit play written by Krishna Kumar in 1984. The story is a variation of the popular legend that Kālidāsa was mentally challenged at one time and that his wife was responsible for his transformation. Kālidāsa, a mentally challenged shepherd, is married to Vidyottamā, a learned princess, through a conspiracy. On discovering that she has been tricked, Vidyottamā banishes Kālidāsa, asking him to acquire scholarship and fame if he desires to continue their relationship. She further stipulates that on his return he will have to answer the question, Asti Kaścid Vāgarthaḥ" ("Is there anything special in expression?"), to her satisfaction. In due course, Kālidāsa attains knowledge and fame as a poet. Kālidāsa begins Kumārsambhava, Raghuvaṃśa and Meghaduta with the words Asti ("there is"), Kaścit ("something") and Vāgarthaḥ ("spoken word and its meaning") respectively.

Bishnupada Bhattacharya's "Kalidas o Robindronath" is a comparative study of Kalidasa and the Bengali poet Rabindranath Tagore.

Ashadh Ka Ek Din is a Hindi play based on fictionalised elements of Kalidasa's life.

== See also ==
- Sanskrit literature
- Sanskrit drama
- Bhāsa
- Bhavabhūti
