= Sāvitri (opera) =

Chamber opera

- Chamber opera by Gustav Holst
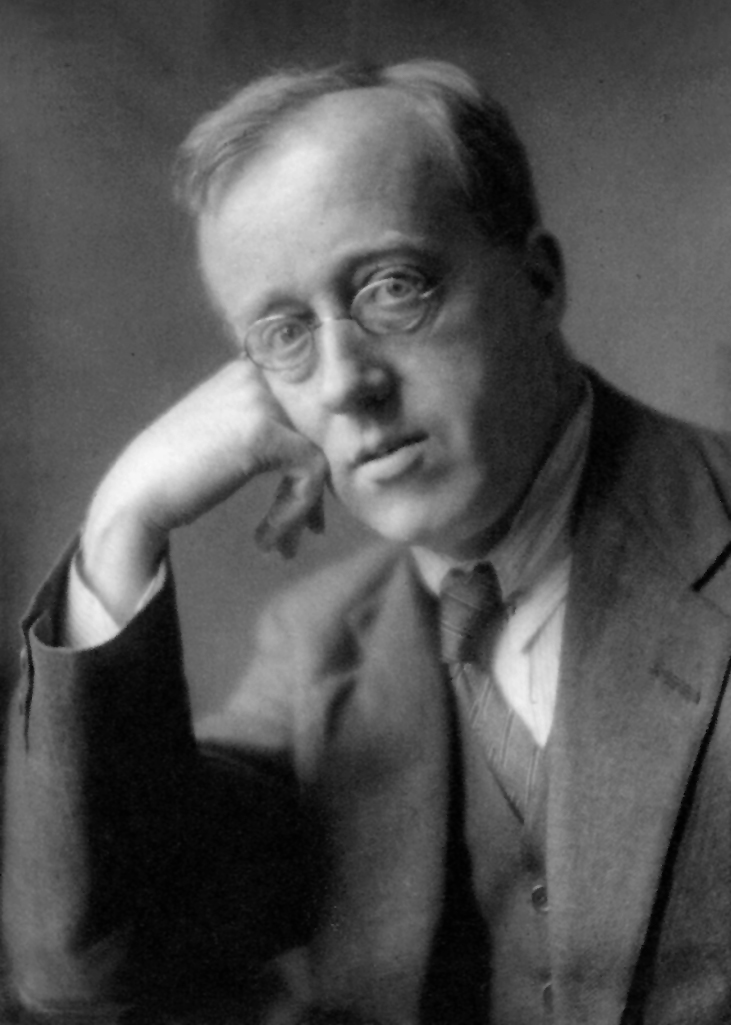
- Holst, circa 1921
- Librettist: Holst
- Based on: Savitri and Satyavan
- Premiere: 5 December 1916; Wellington Hall, London

Sāvitri is a chamber opera in one act with music composed by Gustav Holst in 1908, his Opus 25, to his own libretto. The story is based on the episode of Savitri and Satyavan from the Mahābhārata, which was also included in Specimens of Old Indian Poetry (Ralph Griffith) and Idylls from the Sanskrit. The opera features three solo singers, a wordless female chorus, and a chamber orchestra of 12 musicians (consisting of 2 flutes, a cor anglais, 2 string quartets and a double bass). Holst had made at least six earlier attempts at composing opera before arriving at Sāvitri.

== Performance history ==
The opera was first given in an amateur performance at Wellington Hall, London, on 5 December 1916. Holst had intended the work to be performed "in the open air, or else in a small building". Its first professional performance, conducted by Arthur Bliss, was staged on 23 June 1921 at the Lyric Theatre, Hammersmith with Dorothy Silk in the title role, Steuart Wilson as Satyavan, and Clive Carey as Death.

== Critical appreciation ==
Holst's friend and fellow composer Ralph Vaughan Williams noted Holst's use of modal style in the opera. John Warrack has commented on Holst's use of bitonality at the opening of the opera, representing the distinct yet subtly connected realms of Sāvitri and Death. Donald Mitchell, in his highly critical comments on the opera, noted the influence of Richard Wagner in the vocal style, even as Holst had nominally renounced the epic scale of Wagner's operas in terms of size of musical forces. Byron Adams has described the opera's characters as more "archetypes" than people. By contrast, Andrew Clements has written highly of how well the opera combines 'Eastern' culture into a 'Western' music format.

== Roles ==
- Satyavān (tenor)
- Sāvitri (soprano)
- Death (bass)

== Synopsis ==
Sāvitri, wife of the woodman Satyavān, hears the voice of Death calling to her. He has come to claim her husband. Satyavān arrives to find his wife in distress, but assures Sāvitri that her fears are but Māyā (illusion): "All is unreal, all is Māyā." Even so, at the arrival of Death, all strength leaves him and he falls to the ground. Sāvitri, now alone and desolate, welcomes Death. The latter, moved to compassion by her greeting, offers her a boon of anything but the return of Satyavān. Sāvitri asks for life in all its fullness. After Death grants her request, she informs him that such a life is impossible without Satyavān. Death, defeated, leaves her. Satyavān awakens. Even "Death is Māyā".

== Recordings ==
- Decca: Dame Janet Baker, Robert Tear, Thomas Hemsley; Purcell Singers; English Chamber Orchestra; Imogen Holst, conductor
- Hyperion CDH55042 (Helios reissue): Felicity Palmer, Philip Langridge, Stephen Varcoe; The Richard Hickox Singers; City of London Sinfonia; Richard Hickox, conductor (1983)
- Phoenix PHCD 14: Jessica Miller, Simon O'Neill, Kyu Won Han; Manhattan School of Music Opera Theater; Manhattan Chamber Sinfonia; Glen Barton Cortese, conductor
