= Edwin Evans (music critic) =

English music critic (1874–1945)

Edwin Evans (1 September 1874 – 3 March 1945) was an English music critic.

Evans was born in London. His father (1844–1923) of the same name was a composer, writer on music and an organist. Edwin's early education was at Lille from the age of nine until eleven, then at Echternach in Luxembourg for another four years. On returning to England, he successively worked in cable telegraphy, the stock exchange and banking, and financial journalism.

Then in 1901 he started his career in music criticism, first writing on French music, championing the music of Claude Debussy in particular but also of Henri Duparc, Paul Dukas, Gabriel Fauré and Maurice Ravel. Between 1907 and 1917 he served on the committee of the Société des Concerts Français, which presented the first British performances of 240 French chamber works. He went on to champion Russian composers, notably those associated with Sergei Diaghilev's Ballets Russes, and British composers: in 1919–20 he wrote a series of articles on British composers for The Musical Times.

Evans was music critic of the Pall Mall Gazette (1912–23), editor of The Musical News and Herald (1921–22), editor of The Dominant (1927–9, 17 monthly issues), editor of The Music Lover (1931–1934), and from 1933 music critic for the Daily Mail succeeding Richard Capell. In 1938 he was elected President of the International Society for Contemporary Music, succeeding Edward Dent. In May 1920 he produced J. M. Barrie's one act play The Truth About the Russian Dancers at the London Coliseum with music by Arnold Bax and scenery by Paul Nash. It was later revived at the Savoy Theatre in July 1926. In 1931 he contrived a ballet, The Lord of Burleigh for the Camargo Society, using the music of Mendelssohn (orchestrated by Gordon Jacob) and characters from the poetry of Tennyson. It was first performed at the Carlton Theatre on 15 December 1931.

Evans married Blanche Norman in 1899, and they had a son and a daughter. There was also a daughter out of wedlock, from an affair Evans began in 1917 with Rachel ‘Ray’ Litvin (1890-1977), an actor with the Lilian Baylis Old Vic Theatre in London. Their daughter, born in 1919, was the pianist and author Natasha Spender, who did not know her father until the age of 12 when she was sent to ask him for money.

His address in 1935 was 31, Coleherne Road, London SW10. He died in London in 1945, aged 70. His private library, which included a collection begun by his father, would form the basis of the Central Music Library (now known as the Westminster Music Library) established in Westminster in the following year. The library holds a portrait in oils of Evans painted in 1916 by Mary Eristoff.
