= Mabel Haynes Bode =

British historian (1864–1922)

- Born: Mabel Kate Haynes; 28 October 1864; England
- Died: 20 January 1922 (aged 57); Shaftesbury, Dorset, England
- Education: Notting Hill High School, University College London, University of Berne
- Scientific career
- Fields: Pali, Sanskrit, Buddhist Studies
- Workplaces: School of Oriental Studies, University College London

Mabel Haynes Bode (28 October 1864 – 20 January 1922) was one of the first women to enter the academic fields of Pali, Sanskrit and Buddhist studies. She lectured in Pali and Sanskrit, made an edition of the Pali text Sāsanavaṃsa, and helped with translating into English of the German translation of the Mahāvaṃsa. She was specializing in the Pali literature of Burma, about which she wrote a book published in 1909. She was the first woman to have an article published in the prestigious Journal of the Royal Asiatic Society.

== Early life ==
Mabel Kate Haynes was born on 28 October 1864 to Robert and Emily Haynes. Her father was a well-known law publisher and bookseller, and a partner in the firm Stevens & Haynes. Her mother died of typhoid fever in 1870. In 1879, her father died. She and her older sister Lily continued to live with an aunt who had moved in after their mother died. On 15 November 1888, Mabel married William Ernest Bode, an actor professionally known as Milton Bode at St Pancras parish church. The marriage didn't work out. Within four years of their marriage, William was living with another woman.

== Education ==
Bode writes in the curriculum vitae she provided to the university in Berne: "After attending private schools in my childhood I went through the (public school) curriculum on the Notting Hill High School for Girls (London), taking prizes for Latin and English Literature, and finishing at the age of seventeen in the top-form."

In 1891, she studied Pali language and Buddhist literature under Prof. T.W. Rhys Davids at University College London. In 1894, she studied Sanskrit with Prof. E. Muller-Hess at Berne University. In 1895, she attended the Sanskrit lectures of Professor Cecil Bendall at University College London. In 1896 she attended lectures in Classical and Vedic Sanskrit of Prof. Sylvain Lévi at the Collège de France in Paris and Prof. Victor Henry at Sorbonne besides those of Prof. Sylvain Lévi and Prof. Louis Finot at the Ecole des Hautes Etudes. She also did courses in History. In Paris she became fluent in French and continued living there on and off until 1908.

In 1897–98, she studied Sanskrit at Berne with Professor E. Muller-Hess and history with Professor Woker. She received her phD at the University of Berne in 1898. Her dissertation was called "A Burmese historian of Buddhism". It is a study of the Burmese Pali historical text Sāsanavaṃsa and its author Paññāsāmi.

In 1904–06, she attended studied Sanskrit with Prof. Carlo Formichi at the University of Pisa.

== Career ==
She gave her debut lecture Women leaders of the Buddhist Reformation at the ninth International Congress of Orientalists in London in 1892. The following year this lecture was published in the Journal of the Royal Asiatic Society of Great Britain and Ireland, making her the first woman to contribute an article to this academic journal. In 1909 she became Assistant Lecturer at University College London. In 1911 she was awarded a Civil List Pension of £50 "in consideration of the value of her contributions to the study of Pali". From 1911 to 1917, she was lecturer at the Indian School (Pali & Buddhist literature), University College London and the first lecturer in Pali at the School of Oriental Studies.

She contributed materials to The Pali Text Society's Pali-English Dictionary of T. W. Rhys Davids and William Stede. Viet-Net notes that she translated Wilhelm Geiger's German language version of the Mahavamsa (the Great Chronicle or The Great Dynasty of Ceylon/Sri Lanka) into English, in 1921, one year before her death.

During World War I, she was a helper to the Belgian committee and the French Red Cross. One of her private pupils was the composer Gustav Holst, who became known for his compositions based on ancient Sanskrit texts. She wrote articles for the Times Literary Supplement in collaboration with Mr T.W. Rolleston. In 1918, she resigned from her teaching posts due to ill health.

== Later life ==
In 1918, she moved to reside with her sister and brother-in-law in London, and then to The Chantry, Shaftesbury, Dorset, where she died on 20 January 1922. She is buried at St James Church, Shaftesbury. Her gravestone's inscription reads "Et prope et procul usave cor cordium dum vivam et ultra".

== Articles and books ==
- Women leaders of the Buddhist Reformation in Transactions of the 9th. International Congress of Orientalists, London, 1892, pp. 341–343. Also published in Journal of the Royal Asiatic Society of Great Britain & Ireland (New Series), Volume 25, Issue 03, July 1893, London, pp. 517–566. Can be viewed here and here.
- Index to the Gandhavamsa, Journal of the Pali Text Society Vol IV, 1896.
- Sasanavamsa, Pali Text Society, London, 1897.
- A Burmese historian of Buddhism, (subtitled dissertation presented to the Philosophical Faculty of the University of Berne for the degree of Doctor of Philosophy), Woking, 1898. Can be viewed here.
- The transformation of Sanskrit studies in the course of the 19th century by Sylvain Levi, translated by Mabel Haynes Bode. Published for the Congress of Arts & Science Universal Exposition, 1904.
- On German universities : A review of Prof. Paulsen's work on the German university system, a pamphlet published in London by P.S. King & Son, 1905.
- The Kharostra country & the Kharostin writing by Sylvain Levi, translated by Mabel Haynes Bode. Published by the Royal Geographic Society, 1906.
- Early Pali Grammarians in Burma, Journal of the Pali Text Society vol VI, 1908.
- The Pali literature of Burma, published by the Royal Asiatic Society, London 1909..
- The Legend of Raṭṭhapāla in the Pali Apadāna and Buddhaghosa's Commentary in Melanges d'Indianisme: offerts par ses élèves à Sylvain Lévi, Paris, 1911, pp. 183–192.
- Profile, worldcat.org. Accessed April 9, 2024.
- The Mahāvaṃsa, or, The great chronicle of Ceylon, translated into English by Wilhelm Geiger, assisted by Mabel Haynes Bode; with an addendum by G.C. Mendis, published in London for the Pali Text Society by H. Frowde, 1912.
