= Martin Clayton (ethnomusicologist) =

Martin Clayton, FBA is professor in ethnomusicology at Durham University. He studied at the School of Oriental and African Studies, from where he received his BA in music and Hindi in 1988 and his PhD in ethnomusicology in 1993.

== Selected publications ==
- Time in Indian Music: Rhythm, metre and form in North Indian rag performance. Oxford University Press, Oxford, 2000.
- Music, time and place: Essays in comparative musicology. B.R. Rhythms, Delhi, 2007.
- Music and Orientalism in the British Empire, 1780s–1940s. Co-authored with Bennett Zon, Routledge, 2016.
