= Justin Read =

English businessman

Justin Richard Read (born May 1961) is an English businessman particularly associated with the financial management of construction and property-related companies.

== Early life and education ==
Read studied modern history at the University of Oxford, graduating in 1983, and has an MBA from INSEAD (1990).

== Career ==
Read worked for businesses including Euro Disney, Bankers Trust and Hanson plc (during 13 years at Hanson he served as deputy FD, MD of Continental Europe, head of risk management and group treasurer), and has been a director of companies including:

- Hanson plc (October 1993 – May 2003)
- Speedy Hire (finance director, April 2008 – August 2011)
- Segro plc (finance director, August 2011 – December 2016)
- Ibstock plc (non-executive director, appointed January 2017)
- Grainger plc (non-executive director, appointed February 2017)

In December 2017 he was appointed as a non-executive director to succeed one-time Hanson colleague Andrew Dougal as chair of the audit committee of Carillion, six weeks before it went into liquidation.
