= Air Transat =

Airline in Canada

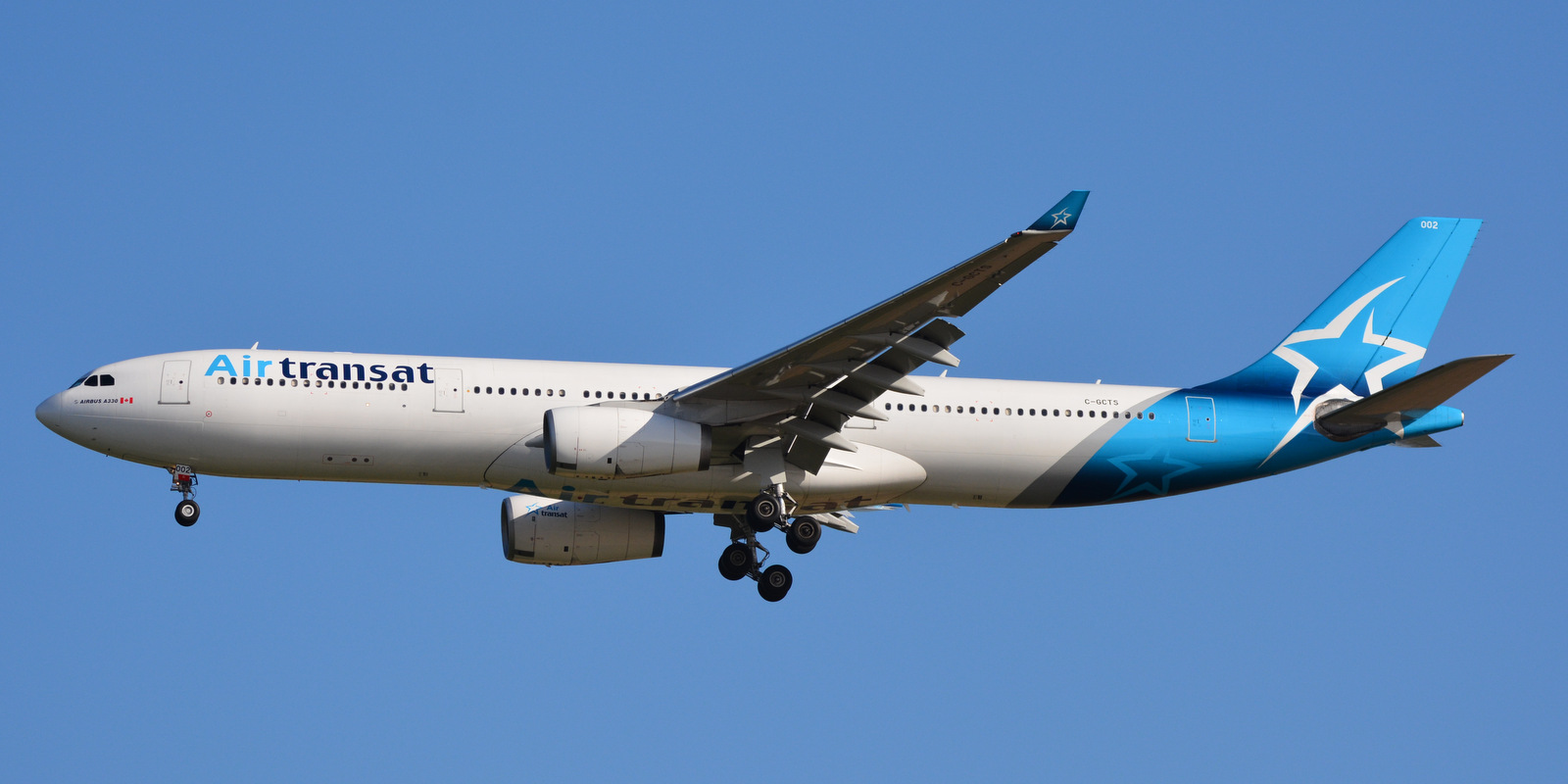
- An Air Transat Airbus A330
IATA	ICAO	Call sign
TS	TSC	AIR TRANSAT
- Founded: December 1986; 39 years ago
- Commenced operations: 14 November 1987; 39 years ago
- AOC #: Canada: 5311
- Hubs: Montréal–Trudeau; Toronto–Pearson
- Focus cities: Ottawa; Québec City
- Frequent-flyer program: Staria
- Fleet size: 41
- Destinations: 66
- Parent company: Transat A.T.
- Headquarters: Montreal, Quebec, Canada
- Key people: Annick Guérard (president & CEO); Marc-Philippe Lumpé (COO); Susan Kudzman (president of the board of directors)
- Revenue: ▲CAN$3.398 billion (2025)
- Net income: ▲CAN$241.9 million (2025)
- Employees: 5,500 (2026)
- Website: airtransat.com

Air Transat (French pronunciation: [ɛːʁ tʁɑ̃zat]) is a Canadian airline headquartered in Montreal, Quebec. Founded in 1986, it operates flights to over 65 destinations in 35 countries. Air Transat is owned and operated by Transat A.T. Inc., with 42 aircraft registered with Transport Canada as of 11 April 2026.

Its hubs are Montréal–Trudeau International Airport, Toronto Pearson International Airport, and Québec City Jean Lesage International Airport. It flies to Europe, the Caribbean and the Antilles, North America, Central America, South America, and Africa. It also maintains partnerships with about twenty airline partners worldwide.

The company employs more than 5,000 people. It is also a founding member of the National Airlines Council of Canada.

During the 2025 fiscal year, Air Transat served approximately 5.4 million passengers, compared to 5.3 million in 2024 and 5.1 million in 2023.

For the seventh time in 2025, it was voted the World's Best Leisure Airline at the Skytrax World Airline Awards.

== History ==
=== Early years (1986–1999) ===
François Legault founded Air Transat with other business partners such as Jean-Marc Eustache, Philippe Sureau, Lina de Cesare, Yvon Lecavalier, and Pierre Ménard.

Air Transat made its inaugural flight on 14 November 1987, from Montreal to Acapulco with a Lockheed L-1011. By April 1988, Air Transat expanded its operations at the Toronto Pearson International Airport, and in May 1988, it completed its very first transatlantic flight between Montréal–Mirabel Airport and Paris-Orly Airport.

In December 1990, the fleet consisted of five L-1011 aircraft. In 1992, three Boeing 727-200s were added.

In 1993, Air Transat assumed defunct Nationair's maintenance base and aircraft.

On 13 March 1997, François Legault left his role as President and Chief Executive Officer of the Air Transat subsidiary, surprising financial markets, the industry, and its partners. The primary reason for his departure was a conflicting vision with his two main partners, Jean-Marc Eustache and Philippe Sureau, regarding the pace of the company's expansion. He sold his shares for an estimated $19 million, before entering politics.

=== Expansion (2000–2020) ===
In February 2005, Air Transat relocated its activities from Montréal–Mirabel Airport and officially inaugurated its operational facilities in the Montréal–Trudeau airport zone.

On 13 February 2009, Transat A.T. announced a five-year partnership with CanJet. From 1 May 2009, Transat Tours Canada chartered CanJet's Boeing 737 aircraft flying from Canadian cities to various destinations. This replaced an agreement with Calgary-based WestJet.

On 13 February 2011, Air Transat Flight TS163 operated with the airline's first all-female flight crew from Cancun to Vancouver.

In 2012, the airline was named World's Best Leisure Airline by Skytrax. The airline reclaimed the global title in 2018 and has won it nearly every year since (2019, 2021, 2023, 2024, and 2025), with the exceptions of 2020 due to the COVID-19 pandemic. In 2022, it was named North America's Best Leisure Airline.

On 12 September 2013, Air Transat struck a seasonal lease deal with Air France–KLM leisure carrier Transavia France, covering the lease of up to nine Boeing 737-800s by 2019. The deal, which extended a 2010 winter capacity agreement, called for Transavia France to lease four 737-800s to Air Transat during winter 2014, five in 2016, six in 2017, seven in 2018, and eight in 2019.

In March 2016, Air Transat's head office in Saint-Laurent, Montreal was named among the greenest head offices in North America according to Corporate Responsibility magazine.

In May 2017, Air Transat and Flair Airlines were accused by a CBC News story of misleading customers and regulators in Canada and Mexico by marketing and selling nonstop tickets between Edmonton and Cancun. CBC uncovered a letter in which the airlines admitted that they would frequently divert for a technical stop to refuel.

In January 2020, Forbes Canada named Air Transat in its list of best employers, to eighth place nationally.

On 17 July 2020, during the delivery of two new Airbus A321LR aircraft from Hamburg to Montreal, Air Transat made history by completing two flights powered by a kerosene blend containing 10% sustainable aviation fuel (SAF), a first for both the Canadian airline and the Airbus facility.

=== COVID-19 pandemic (2020–2021) ===
On 18 March 2020, the airline announced a phased grounding of all its flights amidst the COVID-19 pandemic. It halted new ticket sales to dedicate its resources entirely to repatriating an estimated 65,000 customers, working closely with the Canadian government. By 1 April 2020, the carrier had completely suspended all flight operations, forcing the temporarily lay off roughly 70% of its staff, i.e., about 3,600 employees, including the entirety of flight crews. This total shutdown was unavoidable given the airline's reliance on the leisure travel market, which was severely disrupted by international border closures and restrictions on non-essential travel.

The airline opted to provide customers with travel credits rather than cash refunds, a decision that drew sharp criticism from various consumer protection groups. British consumer site MoneySavingExpert named Air Transat as one of the worst-performing travel firms for refunding passengers whose flights or trips were cancelled. The United Kingdom's Civil Aviation Authority (CAA), in a report examining the impact of COVID-19 on airline carriers' treatment of passengers to and from the UK during the pandemic, found that Air Transat was one of the airlines failing to provide cash refunds to passengers whose flights had been cancelled by the airline, in breach of the Flight Compensation Regulation. The regulation requires airlines to refund passengers whose flights are cancelled under any circumstances, including the COVID-19 pandemic; the report also noted that CAA's inquiries, while preparing the report, had resulted in Air Transat assuring it that all cash payments would henceforth be handled properly.

On 23 July 2020, Air Transat launched a gradual and limited flight schedule following a 112-day grounding. On 29 January 2021, the airline was forced to halt all regular flights for a second time as new COVID-19 variants spread. After completing a final round of repatriation flights, the airline suspended operations for another 182 days. Phased flight operations resumed on 30 July 2021.

=== Recent developments (2021–present) ===
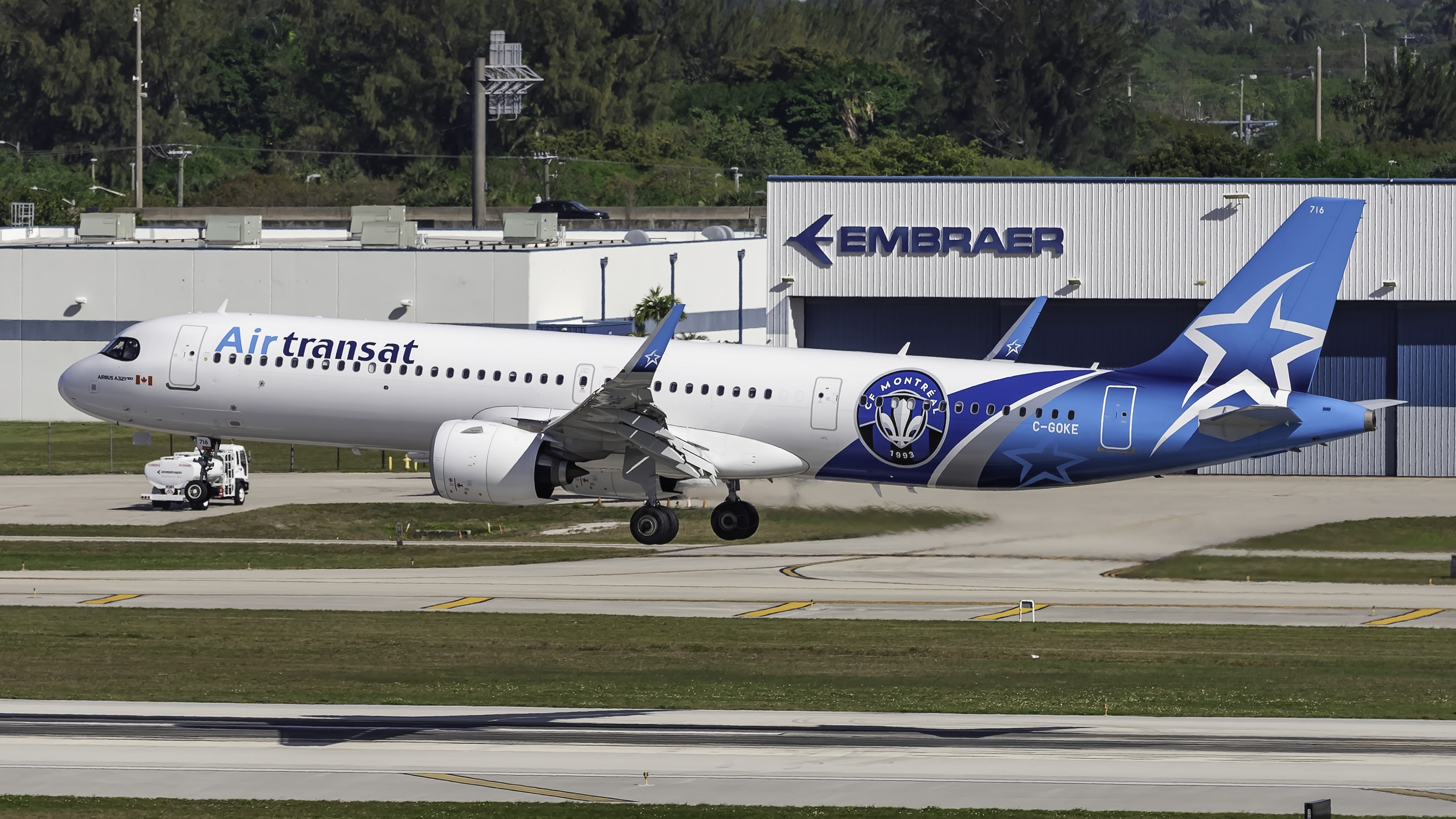
Air Transat A321 with CF Montreal livery

On 27 May 2021, Transat A.T. co-founder Jean-Marc Eustache retired. He was succeeded by Annick Guérard, who had been Chief Operating Officer since 2017, as she took over the role of President and Chief Executive Officer.

On 25 July 2023, Pratt & Whitney announced the discovery of a rare condition in the powdered metal used to manufacture certain turbine discs for GTF engines, requiring a global recall and inspection program. Air Transat, whose Airbus A321LR fleet is the cornerstone of its business model, was disproportionately affected. To offset the simultaneous grounding of up to six aircraft through 2024, the airline initiated a wet-leasing strategy in December 2023. As global supply chain bottlenecks delayed engine repairs into 2025, Air Transat secured financial compensation agreements with the manufacturer to mitigate the ongoing operational disruptions.

On 28 November 2023, Air Transat and Porter Airlines formed a joint venture to make the two airlines' networks complementary while leveraging their respective markets.

On 21 February 2024, Air Transat announced a multi-year partnership agreement with CF Montréal; it also unveiled an exclusive livery on one of its Airbus A321LRs featuring the soccer club's branding.

On 19 January 2026, Air Transat announced the first phase of its new loyalty program, featuring a line of credit cards in collaboration with Desjardins and Visa. The official launch of the program is scheduled for the second half of 2026.

On 9 February 2026, many Canadian airlines including Air Transat announced the temporary suspension of all flights to Cuba through 30 April 2026, following a severe aviation fuel shortage at the island's airports. On 12 February 2026, also alongside several Canadian airlines, Air Transat suspended flights to the United States due to decline in demand.

== Corporate affairs ==
=== Business Trends ===
The key trends for Air Transat (Transat A.T.) are (as of the financial year ending December 31):

	Operating revenue (C$M)	Net profit (C$M)	Number of employees (FTE)	Passenger load factor (%)	Number of aircraft	Notes/sources
2016	2,890	−37	~5,000		25	
2017	3,005	138	~5,000		31	
2018	2,993	7	~5,000		34	
2019	2,937	−30	~5,000	88.6	37	
2020	1,302	−497	5,100		34	
2021	124	−389	3,300		31	
2022	1,642	−445	3,900		32	
2023	3,048	−25	~5,000	87.1	36	
2024	3,284	−114	~5,000	85.1	43	
2025	3,399	242	~5,000	84.6	43	
2026 (9 first month of 2026)	2,691	−215	~5,000	83.6	41	

== Takeover bids ==
On 16 May 2019, Transat A.T., the company that owns Air Transat, announced it was in exclusive talks to be purchased by Air Canada for $520 million, representing $13 per share; the same report by the Canadian Broadcasting Corporation stated, "regulatory approvals are no sure thing". Two other bids came through at C$14 per share, namely from Mach Group and Pierre Karl Péladeau through his management company MTRHP. Ultimately, neither of these two rival bids was accepted by Transat A.T.

On 27 June 2019, Transat A.T.'s board accepted Air Canada's all-cash bid, which stated that Air Transat would continue to operate as a separate brand. However, the agreement was conditional on approval from the Competition Bureau and required approval by two-thirds of shareholders. A few major investors and financial analysts stated that the offer was below the true value of the company. By 12 August 2019, Air Canada had increased its offer by nearly 40% to C$18 per share from $13, valuing the acquisition at $720 million (US$544 million), to obtain backing from Letko Brosseau, Transat A.T.'s largest shareholder with 19% of the company. The same day, the Quebec Administrative Court of Financial Markets rejected the rival bid from Groupe Mach.

On 23 August 2019, a 95% majority of Transat A.T.'s voting shareholders approved the $18 per share Air Canada proposal. The proposed transaction was to be publicly assessed by Transport Canada until 2 May 2020, with the buyout to close after that date. The buyout was delayed by the impact of the COVID-19 pandemic, and the share price of Transat A.T. fell to $5.16 by July 2020, largely due to the collapse in traffic and demand caused by pandemic-related travel restrictions. Consequently, on 10 October 2020, Air Canada revised its offer down from $18 to $5 per share, now representing $180 million.

On 2 April 2021, Air Canada and Air Transat announced the termination of their merger agreement following a failure to secure European Commission approval, who feared the tie-up would have a negative impact on supply and prices.

== Destinations ==
Air Transat operates direct international flights to four continents (Europe, North America, South America and Africa) from eastern Canada, namely from Montreal, Toronto and Quebec City. The airline also serves sun destinations during the winter season from several secondary airports in Canada, including Charlottetown, Fredericton, Halifax, London, Ottawa and Windsor.

=== Codeshare agreements ===
- Porter Airlines (joint-venture partner)
- Turkish Airlines
- WestJet

=== Interline agreements ===
- Air Baltic
- Air Mauritius
- Aegean Airlines
- AeroItalia
- Air Europa
- ASL Airlines
- Avianca
- Azores Airlines
- Azul
- easyJet
- Gol Linhas Aéreas
- Jet2.com
- Norwegian
- Pegasus Airlines
- SKY Express
- Viva Aerobus
- Volaris
- Volotea
- Vueling

== Magazine ==
Atmosphere was the semi-annual inflight magazine of Air Transat. It was first published by Business Class Media in 2006 in English and in French, but it was discontinued following the COVID-19 pandemic.

== Fleet ==
=== Current fleet ===
As of September 2026, Air Transat operates an all-Airbus fleet composed of the following aircraft:

Air Transat fleet
Aircraft	In service	Orders	Passengers				Notes
Aircraft	In service	Orders	W	Y	Total	Ref	Notes
Airbus A321-200	7	—	2	196	198		
Airbus A321-200	7	—	2	209	211		
Airbus A321LR	19	—	12	187	199		
Airbus A321XLR	—	4	TBA				Order with one option. First delivery to take place in late 2027.
Airbus A330-200	13	—	12	318	330		
Airbus A330-200	13	—	12	320	332		
Airbus A330-200	13	—	12	333	345		
Airbus A330-300	2	—	12	334	346		
Airbus A330-300	2	—	12	351	363		
Total	41	4					

=== Previously operated ===
Air Transat has operated several other aircraft types in the past, including:

- Airbus A310
- Airbus A320
- Airbus A321
- Airbus A330
- Boeing 727
- Boeing 737 Classic
- Boeing 737 Next Generation
- Boeing 757
- Lockheed L-1011 TriStar

== Accidents and incidents ==
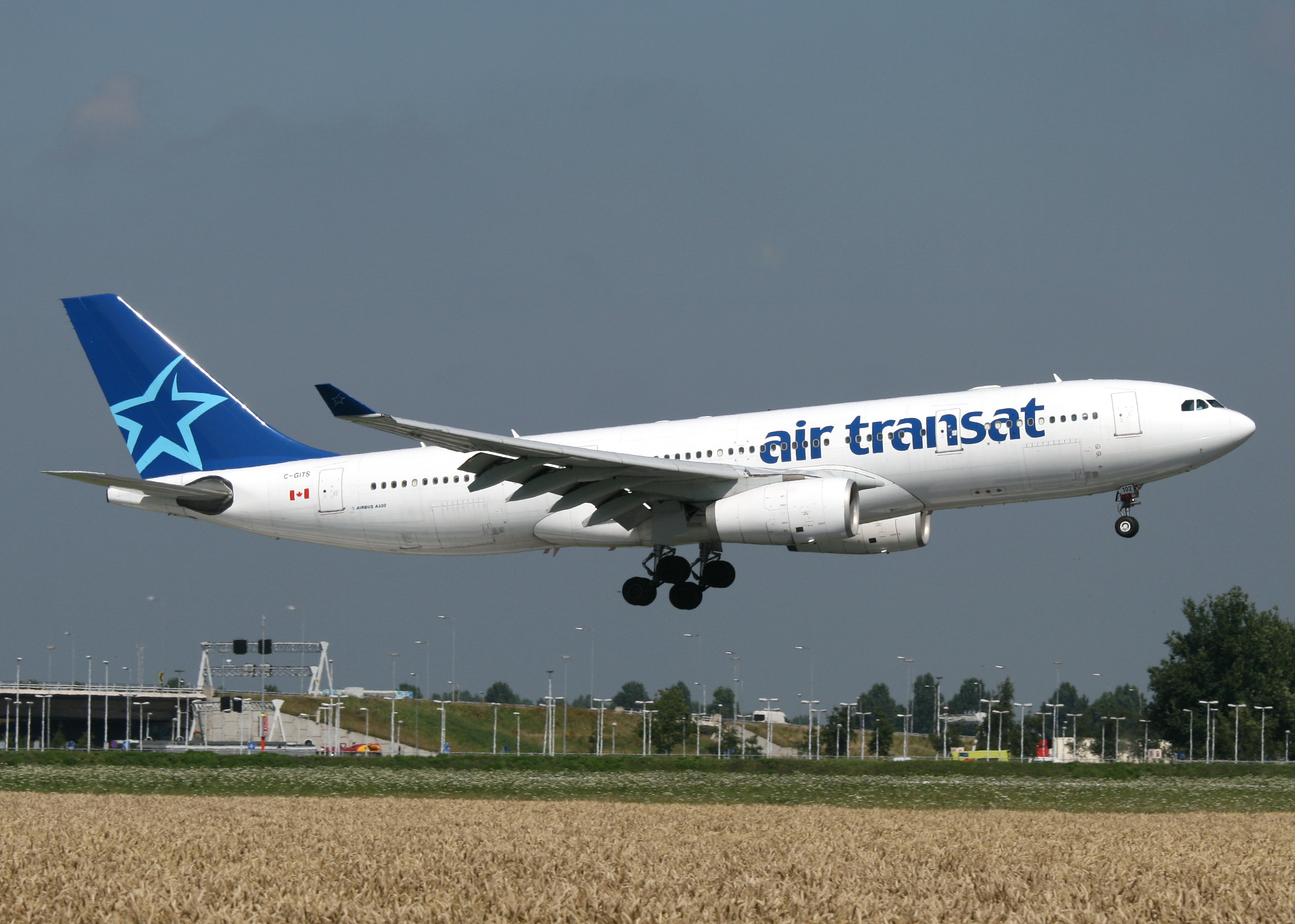
C-GITS, the "Azores Glider". This aircraft operated Flight 236

- Air Transat Flight 906: On 6 July 2001, a Lockheed L-1011 TriStar made a return to Lyon–Saint-Exupéry Airport after encountering severe hail. The aircraft landed safely and none of the 211 passengers and crew members on board were injured, but nearing the end of its life, it was written off. It is still used today for emergency training at Lyon Airport near Lufthansa Cargo.
- Air Transat Flight 236: On 24 August 2001, an Airbus A330-200 en route from Toronto to Lisbon with 306 crew and passengers on board, and piloted by Captain Robert Piché and First Officer Dirk DeJager, made an emergency landing in the Azores without engine power due to fuel starvation over the Atlantic Ocean. The aircraft safely landed at Lajes Air Base, on Terceira Island. The aircraft was evacuated in 90 seconds. All 306 passengers on board survived. An investigation revealed that the cause of the accident was a fuel leak in the number-two engine, which was caused by an incorrect part installed in the hydraulics system by Air Transat maintenance staff. The part did not maintain adequate clearance between the hydraulic lines and the fuel line, allowing vibration in the hydraulic lines to degrade the fuel line and cause the leak. The aircraft involved in the incident was repaired and remained in service with Air Transat until March 2020. The incident went down in history as the longest non-powered flight and landing by a commercial airliner.
- Air Transat Flight 961: On 6 March 2005, an Airbus A310-308 flying from Varadero to Quebec City experienced a structural failure in which the rudder detached in flight. The flight crew were able to regain enough control of the aircraft to return safely to Varadero. The investigation that followed determined that the manufacturer's inspection procedure for the composite rudder was not adequate. Inspection procedures for composite structures on airliners were changed because of this accident.
- Air Transat Flight 157: On 31 July 2017, an Airbus A330-200 en route from Brussels to Montréal was diverted to Ottawa due to a chain of storms passing through the Montreal area. More than 300 passengers were held on the plane without water, electricity, or air conditioning and rationed food for six hours. A passenger called 911 due to the deteriorating situation, with some passengers complaining of suffocation. Airport authorities responded by disembarking passengers. During the investigation, Air Transat blamed congestion at Ottawa's airport for the situation, where airport administration stated that the pilots asked for no help during the situation. The event enraged lawmakers pushing to improve Canada's passenger bill of rights. In November 2017, the Canadian Transportation Agency determined that Air Transat had breached the terms of its tariff during the incident and ordered the airline to pay a C$295,000 penalty.
