= Carillion =

British construction company (1999–2018)

Carillion plc
- Type: Public limited company
- Traded as: LSE: CLLN
- Industry: Construction, civil engineering, facilities management
- Founded: 1999; 27 years ago (demerger from Tarmac)
- Defunct: 15 January 2018
- Fate: Compulsory liquidation
- Headquarters: Wolverhampton, West Midlands, United Kingdom
- Key people: Philip Nevill Green CBE (former chairman); Richard Howson (former CEO); Keith Cochrane (former interim CEO)
- Revenue: £5,214.2M (2016)
- Operating income: £235.9M (2016)
- Net income: £129.5M (2016)
- Number of employees: c. 43,000; with 19,000 in the UK (2016) (Note: Carillion's Annual Report and Accounts for the year ending 31 December 2016 said the group had 31,628 employees - 19,256 in the UK and 12,372 overseas - plus 11,429 staff employed in joint ventures located in the Middle East.)
- Website: pwc.co.uk/carillion

Carillion plc was a British multinational construction and facilities management services company headquartered in Wolverhampton in the United Kingdom, prior to its liquidation in January 2018.

Carillion was created in July 1999, following a demerger from Tarmac. It grew through a series of acquisitions to become the second largest construction company in the United Kingdom, was listed on the London Stock Exchange, and in 2016 had some 43,000 employees (18,257 of them in the United Kingdom). Concerns about Carillion's debt situation were raised in 2015, and after the company experienced financial difficulties in 2017, it went into compulsory liquidation on 15 January 2018, the most drastic procedure in UK insolvency law, with liabilities of almost £7 billion.

In the United Kingdom, the insolvency caused project shutdowns and delays in the UK and overseas (PFI projects in Ireland were suspended, while four of Carillion's Canadian businesses sought legal bankruptcy protection), job losses (over 3,000 redundancies in Carillion alone, plus others among its suppliers), financial losses to clients, joint venture partners and lenders, to Carillion's 30,000 suppliers (some of which were pushed into insolvency), and to 27,000 pensioners, and could cost UK taxpayers up to £180M. It also led to questions and multiple parliamentary inquiries about the conduct of the firm's directors, its auditors (KPMG), the Financial Reporting Council and The Pensions Regulator, and about the UK Government's relationships with major suppliers working on private finance initiative (PFI) schemes and other privatised outsourcing of public services (in October 2018, the UK Government said no new PFI projects would be started). It also prompted legislation proposals to reform industry payment systems, consultations on new government procurement processes to promote good payment practices, and proposed FRC reforms to the treatment of directors' bonuses paid in shares.

The May 2018 report of a Parliamentary inquiry by the Business and the Work and Pensions Select Committees said Carillion's collapse was "a story of recklessness, hubris and greed, its business model was a relentless dash for cash", and accused its directors of misrepresenting the financial realities of the business (three directors were later fined a total of over £600,000 by the Financial Conduct Authority for their part in financial misreporting, with two further fined a total of over £280,000 by the Financial Reporting Council). The report's recommendations included regulatory reforms and a possible break-up of the Big Four accounting firms. A separate report by the Public Administration and Constitutional Affairs Select Committee, in July 2018, blamed the UK government for outsourcing contracts based on lowest price, saying its use of contractors such as Carillion had caused public services to deteriorate.

== History ==
=== Foundation ===
Carillion was created in July 1999, following a demerger from Tarmac, which had been founded in 1903. Tarmac focused on its core heavy building materials business, while Carillion included the former Tarmac Construction contracting business and the Tarmac Professional Services group of businesses. At the time of demerger Sir Neville Simms was appointed executive chairman of the business. Simms stood down from his executive responsibilities in January 2001 but remained non-executive chairman until May 2005 when Philip Rogerson took over the chair.

The name 'Carillion', a corruption of the word 'carillon' (a peal of bells), was intended to give the construction business a clearly defined, separate identity, and to distance it from its construction roots. It was proposed by London branding consultancy Sampson Tyrell (later Enterprise IG, part of WPP).

=== Acquisitions ===
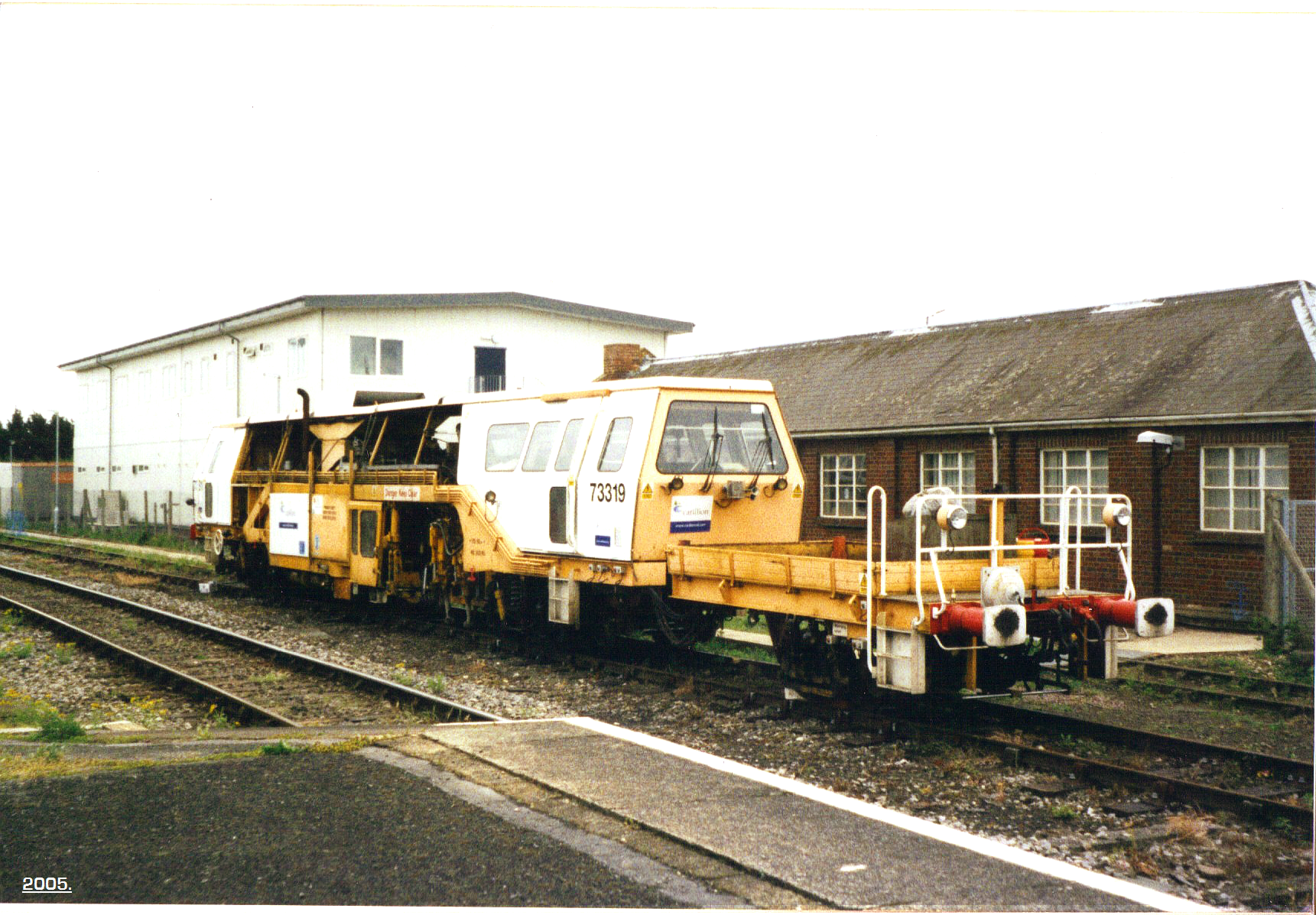
A Carillion Rail ballast/track tamper train at Banbury railway station

Under CEO John McDonough (formerly at Johnson Controls, and appointed Carillion CEO in January 2001), Carillion expanded into the facilities management services sector.

In September 2001, Carillion acquired the 51% of GT Rail Maintenance it did not already own, thereby creating Carillion Rail. Carillion Rail carried out track renewals on the rail network, and contract work for Network Rail.

In August 2002, Carillion bought Citex Management Services for £11.5M and, in March 2005, it acquired Planned Maintenance Group for circa £40M. After that, Carillion went on to acquire two more United Kingdom support services firms: Mowlem, for circa £350M in February 2006, and Alfred McAlpine, for £572M in February 2008. Then, in October 2008, Carillion bought Vanbots Construction in Canada for £14.3M.

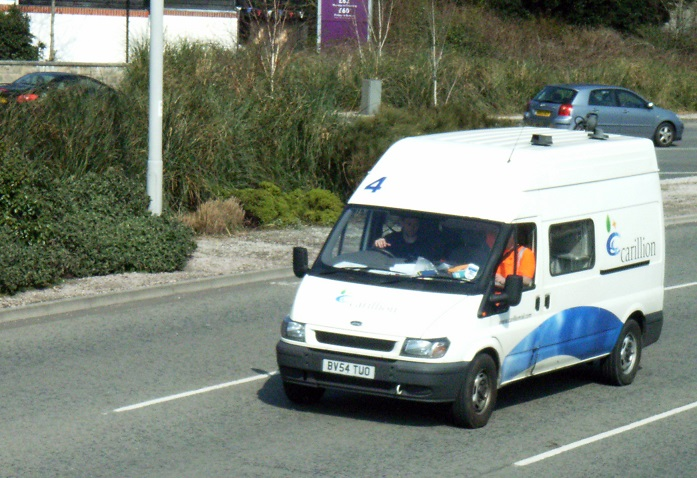
A Carillion Ford Transit panel van

Carillion bought Eaga, an energy efficiency business, for £306M in April 2011. However, by December 2011 the UK Government had significantly reduced the feed-in tariffs for green energy and Carillion had to rationalise the business.

In December 2012, it acquired a 49% interest in The Bouchier Group, a company providing services in the Athabasca oil sands area, for £24m. Then, in October 2013, the company bought the facilities management business of John Laing.

In August 2014, the company spent several weeks attempting a merger with rival Balfour Beatty. Three offers were made; the last bid, which valued Balfour Beatty at £2.1 billion, was unanimously rejected by the Balfour Beatty board on 19 August 2014. Balfour refused to allow an extension of time for negotiations that could have prompted a fourth bid. Carillion announced later that day that it would no longer pursue a merger with its rival.

In December 2014, Carillion acquired a 60% stake in Rokstad Power Corporation, a Canadian transmission and distribution business, for £33M. Carillion acquired 100% of the Outland Group, a specialist supplier of camps and catering at remote locations in Canada, in May 2015 and a majority stake in Ask Real Estate, a Manchester-based developer, in January 2016.

=== Blacklisting involvement ===
In 2009, Carillion was revealed as a subscriber to an illegal construction industry blacklisting body, The Consulting Association (TCA), though its inclusion on the list was mainly due to its previous ownership of Crown House Engineering (acquired by Laing O'Rourke in 2004), and previous use of TCA by Mowlem (acquired by Carillion in 2006). Carillion made two voluntary submissions to the House of Commons' Scottish Affairs Select Committee, one in September 2012, and another in March 2013, relating to its involvement with TCA.

In July 2014, Carillion was one of eight businesses involved in the 2014 launch of the Construction Workers Compensation Scheme, though this was condemned as a "PR stunt" by the GMB union, and described by the Scottish Affairs Select Committee as "an act of bad faith". As one of the contributors to the scheme, Carillion reported in August 2016 "a non-recurring operating charge of £10.5M" representing the compensation and associated costs it expected to pay. In December 2017, Unite announced that it had issued High Court proceedings against 12 major contractors including Carillion.

=== Financial difficulties ===
Concerns about Carillion's debt situation were voiced in March 2015 by UBS analyst Gregor Kuglitsch who highlighted the company's extended supplier payment terms and its use of 'reverse factoring', (Note: Carillion instigated a supply chain finance scheme influenced by the Greensill Capital model (Lex Greensill spoke at a 2014 event organised by Carillion in Wolverhampton). From 2011 to 2016, while Carillion's reported debt rose only slightly (from £839M to £850M), underlying debt in the early payment facility almost tripled, from £263M to £760M. Credit rating agency Moody's suggested that Carillion misclassified as much as £498M of debt in its annual accounts.) argued Carillion was more leveraged than it reported, and predicted a "profit shortfall" was likely. By October 2015, Carillion had become hedge funds' most popular share to 'sell short' as analysts questioned the lack of growth and rising debt. From having less than 5% of its shares shorted at the beginning of 2015, over 20% of Carillion shares were on loan to hedge funds by June 2016; the company's share price fell 19% over the same period.

On 10 July 2017, a Carillion trading update highlighted a £845M impairment charge in its construction services division, mainly relating to three loss-making UK PFI projects and costs arising from Middle East projects. Chief executive Richard Howson (appointed CEO in December 2011) stepped down but was retained as operations director, with Keith Cochrane temporarily becoming CEO (Carillion's search for a new CEO led to the appointment of Andrew Davies, CEO of Wates – announced on 27 October 2017 – with Davies set to join the firm in April 2018).

As a result, the contractor was demoted from the FTSE 250 Index, and five directors (including Howson and finance director Zafar Khan) left the company as it tried to refinance. On 27 September 2017, a Middle Eastern firm was said to be considering a takeover bid. Two days later, it was revealed that Carillion's losses for the six months ended 30 June 2017 totalled £1.15 billion, following a further write down of £200M relating to its support services division.

In September 2017 Keith Cochrane told investors that the business had accepted too many projects which turned out unprofitable and for which the amount paid was insufficient for the cost of work done ("we were building a Rolls-Royce but only getting paid to build a Mini"), and its management structure and internal organisation had been over-complex and lacking sufficient regard to contractual risk assessment and overly optimistic assumptions; as a result, the company had "burned through cash" trying to deliver to a high standard without assessing the possible implications. In September 2019, the Investors Chronicle commented that its financial problems were not a secret and had been known for at least two years, with little working capital, shrinking amounts due to customers, and rising monies withheld by clients.

On 24 October 2017, it was reported that Carillion was preparing to sell its healthcare facilities management business to Serco (the deal included 15 contracts, with annual revenues of approximately £90M for which Serco was to pay £47.7M – later cut to £29.7M – with Carillion losing £1bn from the value of its order book), and was planning to dispose of its Canadian operations to help shore up its finances. A week later, it was announced Carillion was selling its interest in developer Ask Real Estate to West Midlands developers Richardsons Developments for £14M. In December 2017, the Richardsons also acquired Carillion's interest in the Milburngate development in Durham.

In a further profit warning, on 17 November 2017, Carillion said it would breach banking covenants the following month, with full year debts set to reach up to £925M. A recapitalisation plan was to be implemented in early 2018. The company's share price fell over 50% in early trading to just 18p – valuing the business at £73M. Unite the Union sought urgent talks with the company, concerned about the future of around 1,000 Carillion workers plus others employed by subcontractors and agencies. Major shareholder Kiltearn Partners halved its shareholding incurring a loss of over £40M. On 20 December, Carillion announced it had brought forward the arrival of new CEO Andrew Davies to 22 January 2018.

On 3 January 2018, it was reported that the UK Financial Conduct Authority was to investigate the timeliness and content of Carillion announcements from December 2016 regarding its financial situation. Ten days later, the BBC reported that the company had "a matter of days" to avoid collapse and that Carillion was the subject of "high level government meetings".

These meetings continued throughout the weekend of 13–14 January – covering the company's £900M debts, a £580M pension deficit, and many ongoing contracts for government departments – but broke up without a rescue deal agreed, with a potential administration process set to start on 15 January 2018. The Financial Times later reported Carillion had just £29M in cash when it collapsed, and would have run out of cash by 18 January 2018. Consultants PricewaterhouseCoopers (PwC) and EY had both rejected roles as administrators amid concerns they would not be paid.

== Liquidation ==
On 15 January 2018, the BBC reported Carillion was to go into liquidation (as opposed to administration), the company having issued a notice to the London Stock Exchange "that it had no choice but to take steps to enter into compulsory liquidation with immediate effect". The notice anticipated an application to the High Court for PwC to be appointed as Special Managers, to act on behalf of the Official Receiver. Carillion chairman Philip Green (appointed in May 2014) said:

This is a very sad day for Carillion, for our colleagues, suppliers and customers that we have been proud to serve over many years. [...] In recent days however we have been unable to secure the funding to support our business plan and it is therefore with the deepest regret that we have arrived at this decision. We understand that HM Government will be providing the necessary funding required by the Official Receiver to maintain the public services carried on by Carillion staff, subcontractors and suppliers.

Six UK Carillion businesses, including Carillion plc and Carillion Construction Ltd, were liquidated in the first phase. On 19 January, Carillion (AMBS) Limited was placed in provisional liquidation, and on 25 and 26 January 2018 ten further UK companies went into liquidation. Another business went into liquidation on 2 February, followed by ten more on 16 February 2018. Two Carillion businesses in Jersey and Guernsey also went into liquidation, in January and March 2018 respectively. In June 2018, Carillion (Qatar) LLC went into a locally managed liquidation. By the end of 2018, 91 Carillion companies had been liquidated.

In April 2018, the Official Receiver estimated the total liabilities of the then 27 liquidated UK companies at £6.9 billion, a figure over three times higher than given in the Group's accounts at the end of 2016.

On 6 August 2018, the Insolvency Service announced the end of the trading phase of the liquidation, described by the Official Receiver as "the largest ever trading liquidation in the UK". Work on finalising Carillion's trading accounts and payments to suppliers, and investigations into the cause of the company's failure, including the conduct of its directors, continued. In December 2018, it was reported that former Carillion directors Philip Green and Richard Howson had been interviewed by the Insolvency Service. In November 2019, the liquidators said they were reportedly close to clawing back around £510M from asset sales, insurance and debt recoveries.

=== Direct impacts of liquidation ===
The liquidation announcement had an immediate impact on 30,000 subcontractors and suppliers, Carillion employees, apprentices and pensioners, plus shareholders, lenders, joint venture partners and customers in the UK, Canada and other countries.

==== Suppliers ====
Subcontractors were said to be vulnerable: the Specialist Engineering Contractors Group said Carillion's failure "could lead to many smaller firms going under". Up to 30,000 small businesses were reportedly owed money by Carillion, who used 'delay tactics' and withheld payments to suppliers, sometimes for up to 120 days.

Within 24 hours, equipment hire firm Speedy Hire and piling contractor Van Elle were reporting potential losses of £2M and £1.6M respectively; Van Elle also reported uncertainty relating to £2.5M worth of future work for Network Rail. A survey of 133 companies by the Building Engineering Services Association and the Electrical Contractors' Association found that 80 of them were collectively owed £30 million by Carillion, an average exposure of £375,000. Average debts owed to micro businesses (fewer than 10 employees) were £98,000; medium-sized businesses (50 to 249 employees) were owed on average £236,000, with the most exposed firm owed almost £1.4M. Only £31M of the estimated £1bn-plus owed by Carillion was covered by trade credit insurance. In late March 2018, Bury North MP James Frith hosted a meeting in Parliament attended by suppliers affected by Carillion's collapse; companies highlighted unpaid debts of between £250,000 and £2.7M. In August 2018, building services specialist NG Bailey announced a £2.2M exceptional loss for irrecoverable costs arising from a Carillion subcontract at the Midland Metropolitan University Hospital.

On 29 January 2018, CCP, a Slough-based dry lining contractor with a 350-strong site-based labour force, called in liquidators due to debts owed by Carillion. Already financially troubled ground engineering business Aspin Group Holdings went into administration in February 2018 as part of pre-pack deal after the group and its subsidiaries were owed around £800,000 by Carillion (bought by private equity firm Sandton Capital Partners, Aspin subsequently went into administration, with the loss of 200 jobs, in July 2019). On 23 March 2018, 160-strong mechanical and electrical subcontractor Vaughan Engineering warned it faced administration after losing £650,000 on two Carillion projects; KPMG were subsequently appointed as administrators, making 83 employees in Broxburn, 43 in Newcastle and 28 in Warrington redundant. Vaughan collapsed owing £9.2M to its suppliers, though one supplier, Bmech, later claimed that Vaughan used Carillion's collapse as a 'smokescreen' for its own poor payment record. Four companies in Lagan Construction Group went into administration owing £21M in early March 2018 partly as a result of Carillion's insolvency; tightened credit terms and requests for upfront payments had affected cashflow. Similarly, 55-strong Chippenham-based flooring contractor Polydeck blamed Carillion "tailwinds" after it went into administration on 25 May 2018. Cheshire-based civil engineering contractor D G Cummins lost £1.8M owed by Carillion for work undertaken on the M6 motorway widening contract junctions 16–19, and, facing a £600,000 tax demand, had to file a notice of intent to enter administration, endangering 50 jobs.

In October 2018, a report from accountant Moore Stephens said Carillion's liquidation had triggered a 20% spike in the number of UK building firms becoming insolvent: 780 companies fell into insolvency in the first quarter of 2018, up a fifth on the same period in 2017, with small to medium-sized companies and specialist subcontractors particularly hard hit, having to write off virtually everything owed to them by Carillion. Total construction insolvencies in 2018 were up 13% to 2,954 companies, according to law firm Nockolds, who said fallout from Carillion's collapse had contributed to a spike in businesses folding.

Law firm RPC made a "a small number of redundancies" in its construction and projects team as a result of Carillion's collapse.

The impacts of Carillion's collapse extended over a year: in January 2019, construction equipment hirer Hawk Plant went into administration after losing around £800,000 from the collapse of Carillion and a problem contract in Sierra Leone; also in January 2019, piling contractor Van Elle reported pretax profits down 54% to £2.4M as turnover fell 18% to £42.9M in the six months to 31 October 2018 – with its CEO blaming Carillion's collapse for the profit slump. In September 2019, Antrim-based electrical subcontractor Blackbourne ceased trading, making 86 staff redundant, partly due to Carillion debts incurred on the Royal Liverpool University Hospital project.

Some seven years after Carillion went into liquidation, in September 2025, special manager PwC reported that 60 Carillion companies would be unable to pay unsecured creditors anything; just 23 were identified as having potential cash to pay suppliers. In November 2026, PwC sought a court order waiving its obligation to set aside funds for some unsecured creditors arguing that the cost of distributing money would exceed the amount available.

==== Employees ====
At the time of liquidation Carillion employed 18,257 people in the UK. Liquidator PwC began staff consultations over planned redundancies and transfers to new employers. On 2 February 2018, the Official Receiver announced an initial 377 redundancies; a further 994 redundancies were announced during February, 337 in March, 554 in April, 75 in May, 43 in June, 399 in July, and 9 in August, bringing the redundancy total by this date to 2,787 – 15% of the pre-liquidation workforce. In parallel, 13,945 jobs had been safeguarded through transfers (76% of the pre-liquidation workforce), while 1,274 employees left the business through finding new work, retirement or for other reasons; a year after the liquidation, the total number of redundancies was reported as 3,038. Around £50M in redundancy payments had been paid up to September 2018, with the final bill likely to reach £65M.

After staff made redundant claimed PwC did not provide information necessary for them to claim redundancy pay and statutory notice pay, causing financial hardship and threatening mortgages, the Official Receiver established a specialist team and said former staff should receive the necessary information within seven days of being made redundant or transferring to a new employer. In July 2018, Unite launched legal action on behalf of 27 members made redundant at GCHQ in Cheltenham claiming proper consultation had not taken place; in July 2021, on behalf of 263 members seeking compensation over Carillion's failure to inform and consult them on redundancy terms, Unite secured a legal ruling that the group's collapse did not warrant "special circumstances" protection. In January 2019, Unite reported that worker redundancy payment negotiations had been made "unduly complicated" because of Carillion's complex corporate structure, and said the total amount of redundancy pay awarded to ex-Carillion workers was expected to rise to £65M.

A week after the liquidation, PwC agreed with Network Rail that Carillion Construction employees to its projects would have their wages guaranteed through to at least mid April 2018, while Carillion suppliers on Network Rail projects would also be paid. 150 Carillion workers employed on smart motorway joint ventures with Kier were set to become Kier employees; 51 Carillion employees working on seven HS2 civil engineering packages awarded to the CEK joint venture were offered the opportunity to join Kier/Eiffage. Nationwide Building Society took on around 250 former Carillion employees engaged in facilities management work at its offices and branches. Around 1,000 Carillion staff engaged on prison facilities management work for the Ministry of Justice were transferred to a new government-owned company, 22 workers from Carillion's power network business joined J Murphy & Sons, around 60 staff at Carillion's Newcastle-based legal services arm joined Clifford Chance, and 700 employees engaged on Network Rail projects transferred to Amey Rail; Amey paid the Official Receiver £2.1M for Carillion's rail contracts. French engineering group Egis took on Carillion's M40 upkeep motorway contract, safeguarding the jobs of around 95 Carillion workers. Carillion Welding was acquired by Rail Safety Solutions Ltd, saving 63 jobs.

However, the transfer of some overseas-born staff to new employers was hampered by strict application of immigration rules that required the workers to apply for permission to remain in the UK. MPs on the Home Affairs Select Committee, citing the case of Nigerian-born Hamza Idris, called on the Home Office to display flexibility and compassion, concerned that "scores" more workers might also be affected.

In early February 2018, private equity groups Greybull Capital, Brookfield and Endless LLP were said to be interested in acquiring parts of Carillion that might be ringfenced for auction. On 8 February, PwC opened bidding for Carillion's rail division and several of the company's road maintenance and facilities management contracts. Canadian FM firm BGIS, a subsidiary of Brookfield, negotiated to take on 2,500 workers engaged on UK hospital, education, justice, transport and emergency services contracts, but the negotiations failed on 8 March 2018.

Out of nearly 1200 apprentices affected by Carillion's liquidation, around a third – 419 – were still without work in early April 2018; only two had been offered a training contract with a government department or agency. In June 2018, 776 out of 1148 had been re-employed or moved into full-time education, 225 were seeking future work and 147 had become disengaged. Construction apprentices made up 341 of the 356 people made redundant in the week reported on 30 July; Unite said these redundancies reduced UK construction apprenticeship numbers by 1.6%, while the government said the CITB had found new paid employment for 777 former Carillion apprentices. On 31 July 2018, The Guardian highlighted the matter: Unite assistant general secretary Gail Cartmail said: "This is an appalling way to treat these apprentices who should have become the backbone of the industry. To dump them and to destroy their training is an act of crass stupidity."

In April 2018, Carillion's Wolverhampton headquarters was put up for sale for £3M. The building was not owned by Carillion; it had leased it for around £440,000 per annum after it had been bought by an unnamed private investor for £6.165M in January 2016. In July 2018, it was reported that the building had been sold (for an undisclosed sum). At this date, some 140 Carillion staff were still based at the building, working for PwC; over 320 staff had either left or been made redundant. Carillion-owned assets set for auction in July 2018 include 12 car parking spaces at Wolverhampton's Molineux Stadium, and development land in Rowley Regis and Loughborough.

==== Pensioners ====
According to the National Audit Office, £2.6bn in pension liabilities have to be covered by the Pension Protection Fund. Carillion operated 13 UK defined benefit pension schemes with 27,000 members. Following the liquidation, 12 of these schemes entered a Pension Protection Fund assessment period.

==== Clients and projects ====
In January 2018, the contracts previously awarded to Carillion for smart motorway projects were taken on by Kier Group.

Rival contractors looked to take over Carillion's two major hospital PFI projects. Skanska targeted the Midland Metropolitan University Hospital (where 70 Carillion staff lost their jobs) in Birmingham, with the project 18 months late and likely to cost an additional £125M. However, in June 2018, banks financing the project withdrew their support, and HM Treasury cancelled the PFI contract for construction of the hospital, leaving the NHS Trust to search for new investment and pushing the completion date back to at least 2022. Market testing with contractors showed there was little appetite to bid under a private finance model, and that a PF2 bid would be over £100M more expensive and take six months longer. As a result, the NHS trust sought direct government funding, and on 16 August 2018, the government announced it would provide funding to complete the hospital.

Laing O'Rourke negotiated about the Royal Liverpool University Hospital, but the project remained stalled. In early September 2018, the NHS Trust revealed that the cost of rectifying serious faults, including replacing non-compliant cladding installed by Carillion, was holding up plans to restart and finish the £350M project; with the project further delayed, the Trust was considering invoking a break clause to terminate the PFI contract. On 24 September 2018, it was reported that the government would step in to terminate the PFI deal, taking the hospital into full public ownership, meaning a £180M loss for private sector lenders Legal & General and the European Investment Bank. This was confirmed on 26 September 2018, with completion of the hospital in 2020 (later delayed to autumn 2022) likely to cost an additional £120M, due to unforeseen issues left behind by Carillion. On 26 October 2018 Laing O'Rourke was confirmed as the contractor to complete the project. More than a year later, in November 2019, the defective cladding issue remained unresolved. In March 2020, the hospital NHS Trust revealed it was drawing up claims against Carillion's insurers and a Carillion subcontractor, Heyrod Construction.

A delayed National Audit Office report into the government's handling of the Midland Metropolitan and Royal Liverpool hospitals was published in January 2020. The report warned of possible further significant cost increases, particularly to rectify the badly built Liverpool project, and blamed Carillion for pricing the jobs too low to meet specifications. The two projects were expected to cost more than 40% more than their original budgets, and to be completed between three and five years late. However, due to effective risk transfer to the contractor, the total cost to the taxpayer would be very similar to the original plan. A follow-up investigation into the hospitals projects by the Public Accounts Committee was postponed in May 2020 due to the COVID-19 pandemic in the United Kingdom.

The Lincoln eastern bypass project, originally awarded by Lincolnshire County Council to Carillion, was taken over by Galliford Try, adding £24M in costs and delaying the project's completion by six months to May 2020.

The redevelopment of the Vaux Breweries site in Sunderland resumed, after a six-month delay following Carillion's collapse, in July 2018, with Tolent as the main contractor. (Note: Tolent subsequently also went into liquidation in early 2023, and completion of the contract passed to Wates Group.) Tameside Council's 'Vision Tameside' project east of Manchester was taken over by Robertson Construction, but rising costs for this and other former Carillion projects meant 18 major investment projects were put on hold, while the council faced rising fees imposed by PwC. Tameside also faced a £5M bill to repair problems arising from a £2.7M school refurbishment project carried out by Carillion before it collapsed.

Smaller projects, including the construction of new school buildings in Oxfordshire, were also disrupted and delayed. In July 2018, Oxfordshire County Council was reviewing costs and liabilities related to its properties following the Carillion collapse; it was concerned about 'latent defects' – normally dealt with as part of the contract with the builder, but with many Carillion businesses in liquidation now less straightforward if claims needed to be made. In November 2018, the council said that auditing Carillion's shortcomings across 162 of its biggest projects for the council had cost it £1.7M; in the process it had identified missing certificates and fire safety issues on building projects, for which it intended to claim costs (as yet unspecified) from Carillion's liquidators. Exactly how much the council owed to Carillion's liquidators and how much the council intended to claim was unclear in January 2019, although in March 2019, the council was reported to be owing three times what it thought it should pay – a figure that "might run into tens of millions of pounds at least". In May 2024, the council said it had spent over £13m on fixing defects in buildings worked on by Carillion, including 24 schools, the Thame fire station, and Didcot's park-and-ride facility.

On 6 August 2018, the Insolvency Service announced that agreements to transfer the last of 278 former Carillion contracts to new service providers were in place, signalling the end of the trading phase of the liquidation.

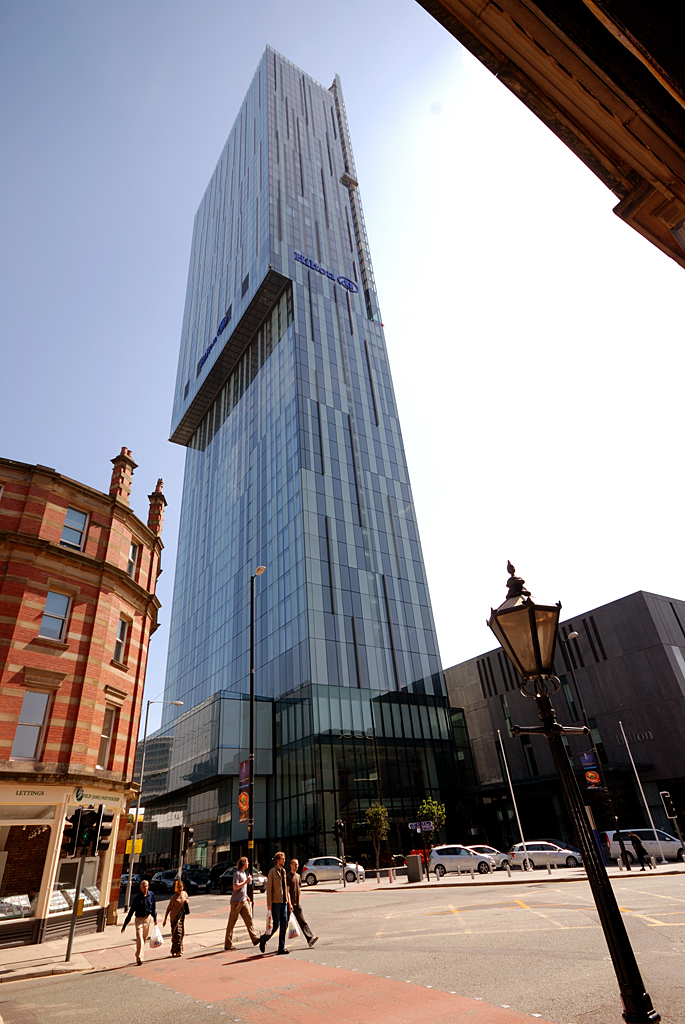
The Beetham Tower, Manchester (2006) built by Carillion

Carillion's collapse also prolonged a £4M dispute relating to faulty glazing on Manchester's Beetham Tower.

==== Joint venture partners ====
Main contractors Balfour Beatty (partner on three highway projects) and Galliford Try (partner on one highway project) were now jointly liable for additional cash contributions: the cash contributions for one of those projects, the Aberdeen Western Peripheral Route, totalled between £60M and £80M; Balfour Beatty estimated a cost across the three schemes of between £35M and £45M, while Galliford Try sought to raise £150M and cut its dividend to support its balance sheet claiming Carillion's collapse had "increased the group's total cash commitments on the project by in excess of £150M" (on 27 March 2018, the company confirmed it had successfully raised £158M in a rights issue). In August 2018, Balfour Beatty said its liabilities on the Aberdeen project had risen by a further £23M and were forecast to reach £135M.

Rail electrification JV partner Powerlines bought Carillion's 50% stake, safeguarding 300 jobs, and Aspire Defence partner KBR acquired Carillion's interests in relation to the Project Allenby Connaught PFI deal. Joint venture partner Abellio withdrew from a bid for a Welsh rail franchise as a result of Carillion's collapse.

In August 2018 Amey completed the acquisition of Ministry of Defence (MoD) housing maintenance contracts previously ran in joint venture with Carillion.

In September 2018, Emaar and Al-Futtaim Group acquired Carillion's stake in Dubai's Emrill, a facilities management company founded in 2002.

In October 2018, Arlington Real Estate completed the acquisition of Carillion's 50% interest in the Durham Gate mixed-use regeneration projects south of Durham.

==== Lenders ====
Five UK banks incurred heavy losses on loans to Carillion. Royal Bank of Scotland (RBS), HSBC, Santander, Lloyds and Barclays had provided £140M of emergency loans in September 2017 and were also lenders on a £790M revolving credit facility. On 22 February 2018, Barclays revealed Carillion's collapse had cost it £127M. On 24 April 2018, Santander revealed a £60M impairment charge attributed mainly to Carillion but also said to include Interserve.

The knock-on impact of Carillion's liquidation also affected bank loans to supplier companies forced into administration: for example, Vaughan collapsed owing £2.9M to Danske Bank.

==== Non-UK operations ====
Outside the UK, the completion and handover of six schools being constructed under PFI arrangements in Ireland was also suspended following Carillion's liquidation, with Irish suppliers fearing non-payment of Carillion debts (on 6 April 2018, 216-strong Co Kildare-based Sammon Contracting Group sought bankruptcy protection after becoming insolvent due to €8M debts on the schools projects, before going into liquidation in early June; numerous other Irish subcontractors were also owed sums – on one school, figures ranged from €16,000 to over €200,000). Work was not expected to resume until May 2018. In March 2018, it was announced that the schools building and facilities contracts had been re-tendered, with the schools expected to open in September 2018, but concerns about whether this completion date would be met continued in late April. In June 2018, the six former Carillion schools contracts were reported to have been taken over by Omagh, Co Tyrone-based contractor Woodvale Construction, with three schools to open in September 2018 and three in December 2018. However, work on some sites was disrupted by unpaid Carillion subcontractors who, on 18 July, became subject to a temporary High Court injunction preventing them from blockading sites.

Four of Carillion's Canadian businesses sought protection from creditors under the Companies’ Creditors Arrangement Act by an Ontario court so that the businesses, employing 6,000 people and including maintenance contracts in hospitals and roadways plus public–private partnership construction of hospitals, could continue. On 5 February 2018 Fairfax Financial announced it had taken over several Carillion Canada facilities management contracts, with over 4,500 Carillion Canada employees joining Fairfax; the deal excluded highway maintenance contracts in Ontario and Alberta. On 15 February 2018, it was reported that the Ontario highways maintenance business could run out of money in days and might need to be bailed out by province authorities, though this was denied by the Ministry of Transportation of Ontario. On 23 February, Carillion Canada's bankruptcy protection was extended to 25 May 2018. On 1 March 2018 Carillion's joint venture partner EllisDon acquired its interests in four Ontario hospital projects, becoming the sole service provider at Royal Ottawa Hospital, Oakville-Trafalgar Memorial Hospital, Brampton Civic Hospital and Sault Area Hospital. The Alberta government made $8.9M available to help Carillion Canada continue its highway maintenance operations for the remainder of the winter season. An additional $3.1M was made available in May to allow the company to continue to the end of June. On 30 July 2018, it was announced that Carillion Canada's highway operations in Alberta and Ontario had been sold to Emcon Services Inc.

=== Political impacts of liquidation ===
There were immediate calls for a public inquiry from politicians and financial analysts in the United Kingdom. On 16 January 2018, the UK government ordered a fast track investigation into the directors at the construction firm to look into possible misconduct.

The company's liquidation raised political questions about the award of UK Government contracts to a financially troubled business, and about Private Finance Initiative projects and wider privatisation of public services. At Prime Minister's Questions on 17 January 2018, Labour leader Jeremy Corbyn challenged Prime Minister Theresa May over Carillion, asking why over £2bn of contracts had been awarded to Carillion even after the company had issued three profit warnings.

Transport Secretary Chris Grayling faced calls to resign, having awarded a major HS2 rail contract to Carillion in July 2017.

Particular concerns were raised about the National Health Service where 14 hospital trusts had relied on Carillion services and where construction of two major hospital PFI projects – the new Royal Liverpool University Hospital and the Midland Metropolitan University Hospital in Birmingham – faced shutdowns and further delays; in March 2018 it was reported that costs on these two projects were over £70M higher than the company was officially reporting. The British Medical Association and Labour Shadow Health Secretary Jon Ashworth were among those who called for urgent action following Carillion's collapse.

The UK Government established a Carillion task force, including representatives from business, construction trade associations, trade unions, lenders and government, chaired by Business Secretary Greg Clark. On 18 January 2018, Clark welcomed the creation of a £225M fund established by HSBC, Royal Bank of Scotland and Lloyds Bank to support suppliers, particularly SMEs, affected by Carillion's insolvency; a further £100M of lending was offered by the state-owned British Business Bank. Around 30,000 suppliers were reported to be owed approximately £1 billion. MP James Frith tabled an early day motion calling on the government to honour all outstanding payments on public contracts for work completed and to enforce public sector 30-day payment regulations.

==== Parliamentary investigations ====
MPs began an investigation into Carillion's pension deficit, amid suggestions that The Pensions Regulator and the firm's pension trustees failed to act after the 2017 profit warnings, putting pensions at risk. Carillion operated 13 UK pension schemes, with around 27,000 members, of whom over 12,000 already received pensions. Despite initial estimates of a £587M deficit, reports suggested the true figure could be between £800M and £2.6bn; on 29 January 2018, Frank Field, chair of the Work and Pensions Select Committee accused Carillion of trying to "wriggle out" of pension payments, resulting in a £990M deficit. Pensions advisers were said to have repeatedly warned that Carillion was prioritising shareholder dividends over the funding of its pension scheme.

Carillion directors, trustees of the company's pension scheme, and the Financial Reporting Council were summoned to appear before the House of Commons Business and Work and Pensions Select Committees on 30 January and 6 February. Directors were also summoned before the Public Accounts Committee on 27 February 2018.

The Business and Work and Pensions Select Committees also wrote to the 'Big 4' firms, KPMG, EY, PwC and Deloitte, asking for detailed accounts of services offered to Carillion, its subsidiaries and pension scheme since 2008, and what fees were received. At 30 January hearing, Frank Field asked the FRC's head Stephen Hadrill whether the 'Big 4' should be broken up in the wake of Carillion's collapse. On 13 February, the 'Big 4' were described by Field as "feasting on what was soon to become a carcass" after collecting fees of £72M for Carillion work during the years leading up to its collapse. It later emerged that Carillion paid £6.4M to 12 firms of advisers the day before pleading for an emergency £10M loan from the UK Government; £2.5M was paid to Ernst and Young, with other large payments to Slaughter and May (£1.2M), FTI Consulting (£1M) and Lazard and Co (£0.5M).

In 6 February hearings, Carillion directors blamed the company's collapse on problem contracts (including two hospital PFI projects – in Liverpool and Birmingham – with cost overruns), high levels of debt arising from the 2011 acquisition of Eaga, plus Brexit, the 2017 General Election and interest rates. The company also claimed it was owed £200M in relation to the Msheireb Downtown Doha project in Qatar – former CEO Richard Howson said he felt like "a bailiff" in chasing the debt. (Carillion's claim was subsequently disputed by Msheireb Properties, with the Qataris prepared to testify to the select committees, providing written evidence to them, and said to be considering a £200M claim against Carillion.) MPs on the two select committees also discussed documents showing that Carillion investor Standard Life had expressed concerns over the company's financial management, strategy and corporate governance in 2015. After the session, committee chairs Frank Field and Rachel Reeves said:

This morning a series of delusional characters maintained that everything was hunky dory until it all went suddenly and unforeseeably wrong. We heard variously that this was the fault of the Bank of England, the foreign exchange markets, advisers, Brexit, the snap election, investors, suppliers, the construction industry, the business culture of the Middle East and professional designers of concrete beams. Everything we have seen points the fingers in another direction – to the people who built a giant company on sand in a desperate dash for cash.

After considering the directors' evidence, MPs on the select committees sought further information, particularly where they felt testimony had been "contradictory" or evasive. Other organisations including Msheireb, lawyer Slaughter and May, bankers Lazard and Morgan Stanley, and the clients of three UK PFI projects, were also contacted about their involvement in Carillion's collapse. Published correspondence between shareholders (including Kiltearn, Standard Life and Letko Brosseau) – described as "fleeing for the hills" – and Carillion showed repeated efforts to raise issues with directors with the interim CEO Keith Cochrane said to have only a vague grasp of finances.

Further correspondence showed "contemptuous" Carillion directors had repeatedly refused to fund growing deficits in the company's 13 pension schemes, while pension fund trustees had unsuccessfully sought intervention from The Pensions Regulator in 2010 and 2013. Despite these requests, the regulator only opened the process after Carillion entered liquidation. On 22 February 2018, the Pensions Regulator told a joint select committees hearing that it was considering pursuing individuals connected with Carillion to recover cash for its indebted pension schemes, but was criticised for not forcing Carillion to pay sufficient money into its retirement schemes.

On 22 February 2018, MPs also contested evidence from internal auditor Deloitte and external auditor KPMG (in one exchange MP Peter Kyle told KPMG partner Peter Meehan: "I would not hire you to do an audit of the contents of my fridge"). Rachel Reeves, chair of the business select committee, said:

Auditing is a multi-million-pound business for the Big Four. On this morning's evidence from KPMG and Deloitte, these audits appear to be a colossal waste of time and money, fit only to provide false assurance to investors, workers and the public. [...] Carillion staff and investors could see the problems at the company but those responsible – auditors, regulators, and, ultimately, the directors – did nothing to stop Carillion being driven off a cliff.

Carillion directors' testimony was further questioned when, on 21 February 2018, a whistle-blowing former Carillion executive told The Guardian the company had been in serious financial difficulty in mid-2016 but directors had been "placating the City." Zafar Khan's successor as finance director, Emma Mercer, was also reported to have voiced concerns about accounting irregularities in April 2017 and at a board meeting on 9 May 2017 which received legal advice from Slaughter and May.

After further documentation and correspondence was published by the select committees, Carillion directors bosses were described by MPs as "fantasists" chasing "a pot of gold", with chairman Philip Green described by Rachel Reeves as having "either a woeful lack of leadership or no grip on reality." The board rejected an October 2017 break-up plan from EY that proposed selling off profitable parts of Carillion and then entering liquidation, a strategy that could have raised £364M, with the pension schemes getting £218M; the board believed they could successfully restructure the group. A 2017 report to Carillion's banks from FTI Consulting said the firm hid mounting problems with "aggressive accounting and working capital management."

Interviewed by the joint Business and Work and Pensions Committee on 7 March 2018, key Carillion investors Aberdeen Standard Investments, Kiltearn and Blackrock said the board focused more on their own pay than the company's performance, and questioned KPMG's auditing of the 2016 accounts. The protection of directors' pay extended to the creation of a secret bank account for former CEO Richard Howson's share-related bonuses.

PricewaterhouseCoopers told the Work and Pensions Select Committee on 21 March 2018 that its services over the first eight weeks of the liquidation had cost £20.4M; this followed MPs' accusations that PwC had been attempting "to milk the Carillion cow dry". In February 2019, it was reported that PwC received £44.2M for one year's work on Carillion's insolvency; the firm had 38 people working on the insolvency, down from 155 in 2018. In November 2019, PwC said it had received nearly £53M in fees associated with the liquidation, and had 15 insolvency specialists working on the case.

Two days before 16 May 2018 publication of the parliamentary inquiry report, Frank Field said Carillion had "displayed utter contempt for its suppliers", using them to "prop up a failing business model" and conceal true levels of debt. The report was also expected to recommend that the Insolvency Service should consider disqualifying some former Carillion directors from future boardroom positions, and that The Pension Regulator be scrapped and replaced by a new, more powerful body.

==== Parliamentary inquiry reports ====
The collapse of Carillion and related implications were investigated by multiple Parliamentary select committees.

Described as "excoriating" and "damning", the final report of the Parliamentary inquiry by the Business and the Work and Pensions Select Committees into the collapse of Carillion was published on 16 May 2018. Its opening paragraph summarised the committees' views:

Carillion’s rise and spectacular fall was a story of recklessness, hubris and greed. Its business model was a relentless dash for cash, driven by acquisitions, rising debt, expansion into new markets and exploitation of suppliers. It presented accounts that misrepresented the reality of the business, and increased its dividend every year, come what may. Long term obligations, such as adequately funding its pension schemes, were treated with contempt. Even as the company very publicly began to unravel, the board was concerned with increasing and protecting generous executive bonuses. Carillion was unsustainable. The mystery is not that it collapsed, but that it lasted so long.

The report said Carillion's collapse had significant consequences, citing: over 2,000 job losses; a pension liability of around £2.6 billion reducing payments to 27,000 pension scheme members; debts owed to 30,000 suppliers, sub-contractors and other creditors; and £150M in UK Government expenditure to keep essential public services running. Former directors Philip Green, Richard Adam and Richard Howson were singled out for particular criticism. The select committee chairs (Frank Field and Rachel Reeves) called for a complete overhaul of Britain's corporate governance regime, saying the government had "lacked the decisiveness or bravery" to do so, and accused the big four accounting firms of operating as a "cosy club", with KPMG singled out for its "complicity" in signing off Carillion's "increasingly fantastical figures" and internal auditor Deloitte accused of failing to identify, or ignoring, "terminal failings". The report recommended the Government refer the statutory audit market to the Competition and Markets Authority, urging consideration of breaking up the Big Four, while two regulators, the Financial Reporting Council and The Pensions Regulator, were branded as "chronically passive".

In light of the MPs' criticism, The Pensions Regulator's CEO Lesley Titcomb announced she would step down at the end of her four-year term in February 2019. On 25 June 2018, TPR announced it was considering issuing a contribution notice – a legally enforceable demand for a financial contribution to the pension deficit – against former Carillion directors.

The select committee chairs wrote to former Carillion directors, to financial, auditing and pensions regulators, to industry bodies including the Insolvency Service and the CBI, and to Carillion's auditors seeking their responses to the report. The responses were published on 12 July 2018.

The parliamentary inquiry was criticised for lacking objectivity and thoroughness, treating a highly complex situation in an incomplete manner. In published letters to the committees, ex-Carillion CEO Howson contended that Carillion was a victim of its public sector clients and that "any analysis as to the causes of the failure of Carillion is not complete without looking at the way in which government and the wider public sector procured services from Carillion and failed to administer payments."

The committees chairs were critical of Carillion's directors continued denials that they were to blame, and concerned at the lack of "meaningful competition" in the audit market; Rachel Reeves, chair of the Business, Energy and Industrial Strategy Committee ("BEIS committee"), said: "The CMA needs to closely examine the audit market and as a Committee we will be keen to see what remedies are proposed to fix the broken audit market." In September 2018, Business Secretary Greg Clark announced he had asked the CMA to conduct an inquiry into competition in the audit sector, which was launched in October and reported in December 2018. The CMA demanded "robust reform" and recommended: a split between audit and advisory businesses; more accountability for those appointing auditors, to strengthen their independence; and "joint audits" undertaken by a Big Four and a non-Big Four firm working together (four years after Carillion's collapse, the government was set to publish such plans in January 2022). Simultaneously, a review of the FRC, led by Sir John Kingman, recommended its replacement by a new Audit, Reporting and Governance Authority. In March 2019, the BEIS committee reiterated its view that the Big Four accountants should be broken up.

The Public Accounts Committee published a report on Government risk assessments relating to Carillion on 23 May 2018. It criticised the government for not identifying that Carillion was financially struggling long before its January 2018 collapse, saying its "traffic light" system of warnings (rating suppliers as green, amber, red, plus black for 'High Risk' status) was "too slow and clunky". Carillion had been downgraded to red following its July 2017 profit warning; when officials recommended a provisional black rating in November 2017, Carillion bosses persuaded them not to. Like the Business and the Work and Pensions Select Committees, the PAC called for a Cabinet Office review of the roles of crown representatives after they failed to spot Carillion's perilous state. In September 2018, after receiving a "complacent" Cabinet Office response to the Business and the Work and Pensions Select Committees recommendations regarding crown representatives, Frank Field said: "The picture the Cabinet Secretary paints of our Crown Representatives is more Johnny English than James Bond, instilling little confidence in their ability or capacity to defend the public interest in the multi-billion pound world of Government outsourcing."

The Public Administration and Constitutional Affairs Select Committee said there were fundamental flaws in how the government awarded contracts because of "an aggressive approach to risk transfer." In a report published on 9 July 2018, the committee said ministers tried to spend as little money as possible; it often did not fully understand the risks it was transferring to private companies, and failed to appreciate differences in quality provided by rival bidders because procurement decisions were driven by price. As a result, it said public services had deteriorated. Responding to the PCAC report, the UK government admitted "Carillion’s liquidation has exposed issues that have at times informed a breakdown of trust between government, suppliers and the public." The Cabinet Office, in its PCAC response, said it would require suppliers to reveal more information about their financial health; Whitehall would monitor up to five key performance indicators (KPIs) of major contracts with external suppliers.

==== National Audit Office investigations ====
In June 2018, the National Audit Office published its investigation into the collapse of Carillion, criticising the government for not spotting financial problems at a key supplier sooner. The report also highlighted that accountants and lawyers managing the liquidation were set to earn £70M in fees, with special manager PwC set to receive £50M. It was forecast that the collapse would cost the UK taxpayer £148M, though later estimates put the cost at over £150M, potentially £180M.

The chairs of the Parliamentary select committees enquiry, Frank Field and Rachel Reeves responded to the NAO report. Field said Carillion had "hoodwinked" the government and viewed PwC's involvement in managing the liquidation as a potential conflict of interest. Reeves said: "The dice are loaded in the Big Four's favour. They make a killing in fees advising struggling companies how to turn them round and then they pocket millions tidying up when that advice fails." In August 2018, it was reported that PwC billed for £20.4M in fees during the first eight weeks of the insolvency, charging an average of £356 an hour, with the Official Receiver, David Chapman, alone billing almost £300,000.

In August 2018, former Auditor-General Sir John Bourn told a Channel 4 Dispatches programme that Carillion was "like a Ponzi scheme" while Government scrutiny was "inadequate".

In October 2018, the Guardian reported a National Audit Office finding that in 2015 civil servants working for Health Secretary Jeremy Hunt had lobbied the Cabinet Office to stop failing Carillion hospital projects, including the Midland Metropolitan and Royal Liverpool University hospitals, from being overseen by the Major Projects Authority, an independent watchdog.

==== Legal actions ====
In November 2020, 143 former Carillion staff, supported by Unite, argued that they were not properly consulted on the redundancy process, but their plea for compensation was rejected at an Employment Appeal Tribunal. The tribunal's decision was upheld by an appeal judge in January 2022.

In spring 2021, some individuals sought support to bring a class action against the former directors.

=== Accounting investigations ===
On 29 January 2018, it was reported that Carillion's auditor KPMG would have its role examined by the Financial Reporting Council (FRC). In March 2018, the FRC's conduct committee announced an additional investigation into the conduct of former Carillion finance directors Richard Adam and Zafar Khan (both members of the ICAEW), focusing on the preparation and approval of Carillion's financial reports for 2014, 2015 and 2016, and the six months to 30 June 2017, as well as provision of other financial information from 2014 to 2017. Initial interviews had been undertaken by May 2018, with more to follow; tens of thousands of documents were to be reviewed as part of the FRC's investigation looking at 'contract accounting', 'reverse factoring', 'pensions', and 'good and going concern'. The FRC investigation was later extended to review earlier Carillion reporting in 2013. In November 2019, the FRC gave an update on the progress of four investigations (two concerning auditing, two relating to possible director misconduct). A decision on enforcement action on auditing matters would be made before the end of 2019, it said, while a decision on directors' conduct would be taken by March 2020. In January 2020, the FRC said the scale and complexity of the investigations meant publication of its first report would be delayed to summer 2020. The FRC's first report, which found a number of breaches, was delivered to KPMG in September 2020; the FRC was awaiting a KPMG response before deciding whether to take enforcement action. In March 2021, KPMG was reported to be "inching towards a financial settlement with regulators" over its auditing of Carillion, with the FRC expected to impose a record fine, possibly around £25m, on KPMG for its failings.

Business secretary Greg Clark told the work and pensions committee on 21 March 2018 that he planned an independent inquiry into the operations of the FRC following Carillion's collapse. In November 2018, it was announced that Stephen Haddrill, CEO of the FRC, was to quit, and suggestions that his departure might lead to the body's abolition. In March 2019, the government announced that the FRC would be replaced by a new regulator, the Audit, Reporting and Governance Authority, with enhanced powers, in an effort to "change the culture" of the accounting sector.

In June 2018, it was reported that KPMG and Carillion bosses had maintained a £329M valuation of goodwill relating to the former Eaga business (later Carillion Energy Services), despite huge losses. Ignoring the impairment meant they could continue to pay dividends and directors' bonuses, including £1.8m each paid to Richard Howson and Richard Adam.

In a June 2018 report on audit standards across eight accounting firms, the FRC identified "failure to challenge management and show appropriate scepticism across their audits." It highlighted a decline in the quality of work undertaken by the Big Four, with KPMG performing the worst. There had, the FRC said, been an "unacceptable deterioration" in the quality of KPMG's work, and the FRC would scrutinise KPMG more closely as a result. Itself under pressure to improve, in October 2018, the FRC proposed reforms, including banning audit firms from earning consultancy fees at businesses they audit, to tackle the "underlying falling trust in business and the effectiveness of audit," and severely rebuked KPMG.

==== Actions against KPMG ====
In January 2019, KPMG announced it had suspended the partner that led Carillion's audit and three members of his team; in August 2021, an FRC disciplinary panel was scheduled for 10 January 2022 to hear a formal complaint against KPMG and former KPMG partner Peter Meehan regarding the provision of allegedly false and misleading information concerning the 2016 Carillion audit. At the disciplinary hearing in January 2022, KPMG's UK chief executive Jon Holt said the firm had discovered misconduct by it staff in its own internal investigations, and immediately reported it to the FRC. Following the FRC tribunal, KPMG was fined £14.4M (one of the biggest penalties in UK audit history) for misconduct relating to its audit of Carillion and another firm, and received a "severe reprimand" from the regulator. KPMG were also ordered to pay £3.95M in costs. The tribunal heard allegations that KPMG staff created false meeting minutes and retroactively edited spreadsheets before sharing them. A further tribunal considered penalties for individual KPMG staff, including partner Peter Meehan; the FRC recommended that he be banned for 15 years and fined at least £400,000. In July 2022, it was announced that he had been fined £250,000 and banned for ten years; three other former KPMG executives also received fines and lengthy bans. A junior member of KPMG staff, Pratik Paw – who, aged 25, had been the most junior member of the Carillion audit team – faced a "life changing" fine of £50,000 and a four-year ban, prompting critics to suggest that accounting firms should enable junior colleagues to challenge their superiors, so that low ranking workers are not blamed for accounting scandals. Ultimately, Paw was not fined or suspended but was severely reprimanded.

Also in January 2019, the FRC opened a second investigation into how KPMG audited Carillion's accounts; the FRC's initial investigation report was delivered to KPMG in February 2021. In May 2020, it was reported that the Official Receiver was preparing to sue KPMG for £250M over alleged negligence in its audits of Carillion. In May 2021, the liquidator secured funding for this legal action, with speculation about the likely damages claim rising to as much as £2 billion. The Official Receiver's formal claim against KPMG was lodged on 19 November 2021, potentially one of the biggest claims ever made against a UK accountancy firm. In February 2022, Sky News reported the Official Receiver's claim would be in the range of £1bn-£1.5bn, with one source suggesting around £1.2bn. The OR's negligence claim focuses on the value of major contracts which were not properly accounted for in audits in 2014, 2015 and 2016, resulting in misstatements in excess of £800M within Carillion's financial reports. KPMG was said to have accepted management 'misstatements' for inflated revenue and understated cost positions at 20 projects including the Royal Liverpool Hospital, redevelopment of Bristol's Southmead Hospital, the Aberdeen Western Peripheral Route, and works at Gatwick and Stansted airports. The OR had received legal advice that KPMG was answerable to Carillion's creditors for a portion of their losses. KPMG said: "We believe this claim is without merit and we will robustly defend the case. Responsibility for the failure of Carillion lies solely with the company's board and management, who set the strategy and ran the business." In November 2022, the OR said: KPMG had "failed to respond" to Carillion allegations that it had failed to properly audit the accounting of 20 significant construction contracts. KPMG reiterated that Carillion's failure was solely the fault of the company's board and management. In February 2023, The Guardian reported that KPMG had settled the £1.3 billion lawsuit brought by Carillion's liquidators; details of the settlement were not made public.

In October 2023, the FRC fined KPMG £21 million for its mishandling of Carillion's accounts, saying it had failed to follow "the most basic and fundamental audit concepts" and an "unusually large number of breaches" had been found. For three years before the collapse Carillion was not subject to reliable audits. KPMG would also pay legal costs of about £5.3 million. The previous year a £14.4 million penalty was imposed on KPMG for providing misleading information to the regulator.

==== Actions against former Carillion directors ====
In addition to its initial investigation into the timeliness and content of Carillion's financial announcements, the Financial Conduct Authority said its investigation would extend to allegations of insider trading in Carillion shares prior to its trading update on 10 July 2017. In November 2020, the FCA said some Carillion directors had "acted recklessly" and released "misleadingly positive" market updates before it collapsed, singling out updates issued on 7 December 2016, 1 March 2017 and 3 May 2017. As a result, the FCA said it had sent notices to some former Carillion directors warning of possible enforcement action (possible sanctions include public censure, fines and suspensions from holding certain positions). In January 2021, the Insolvency Service said it would seek to ban eight former Carillion directors from holding senior boardroom positions, namely: Philip Green, Richard Howson, Keith Cochrane, Richard Adam and Zafar Khan, and non-executive directors Andrew Dougal, Alison Horner and Ceri Powell. The directors contested the action. In July 2022, the FCA announced it had would fine Howson £397,800, Adam £318,000 and Khan £154,400; it said the trio had made "misleadingly positive statements" and had "acted recklessly". The three former directors appealed to the Upper Tribunal (Tax and Chancery Chamber) against the penalties, and in July 2025, it was announced their appeals would be heard in February 2026. However, in January 2026, Adam and Khan withdrew their FCA challenges and agreed fines reduced by 10% (to £232,800 and £138,900 respectively), reflecting their cooperation with FCA investigations and an adjustment to Adam's fine following a recalculation of his earnings. The following month, shortly before his appeal was due to be heard at London’s Upper Tribunal, Howson also withdrew his FCA challenge and agreed a fine reduced to £237,700, reflecting his cooperation with the FCA and a recalculation of his earnings.

In July 2023, the Insolvency Service announced that Khan and Adam had been disqualified from acting as company directors for 11 years and 12.5 years respectively. In October 2023, Howson was disqualified from being a director of a company for eight years. The Insolvency Service was also pursuing cases against other former Carillion directors, but a trial due to start on 16 October 2023 was cancelled after the Insolvency Service decided it was not in the public interest to pursue ex-chair Green, interim CEO Cochrane and non-executive directors Dougal, Horner and Powell. The Insolvency Service spent £11M pursuing director disqualifications against the eight former Carillion directors.

In addition to the FCA and Insolvency Service actions, in 2026 the Financial Reporting Council fined Adam and Khan £222,019 and £60,228 respectively. They were also excluded from the Institute of Chartered Accountants in England and Wales for 15 and 10 years respectively. Concluding its investigation into the firm’s collapse, the FRC also imposed fines and bans on three other (unnamed) former Carillion senior accountants who "acted recklessly and failed to act with integrity in connection with the preparation of accounting information for Carillion's financial statements, prior to the company's collapse in 2018."

=== Call for criminal investigation ===
In September 2018, the Unite union called for a criminal investigation into the behaviours of Carillion's management – a call repeated in January 2019, the first anniversary of the company's collapse, and on 2 September 2019, 600 days after Carillion's collapse.

=== Wider impacts on UK industry ===
Mark Farmer, the author of an October 2016 report calling for industry modernisation, repeated accusations that Carillion and many of its rivals had failed to modernise, innovate or cut down on wasteful inefficiencies in their business models and worksite practices. He also warned that Carillion's collapse could be the first of several if the industry did not overhaul itself. This followed a Financial Times report that the Cabinet Office had established a team to monitor Interserve, another financially troubled firm (though a market analyst said: "in the case of Interserve the arithmetic doesn't look anything like as bad as Carillion") (Note: Interserve fell into administration 14 months later in March 2019.) and delayed publication of the March 2017 annual accounts of Laing O'Rourke. Other outsourcing businesses also came under scrutiny: Capita announced a profit warning on 31 January 2018; Serco and Mitie were called to give evidence to Parliament's Public Administration and Constitutional Affairs Select Committee on 8 May 2018; while Kier's financial position was likened to Carillion's in September 2018. (Note: Following a failed rights issue in late 2018, Kier was forced into a prolonged restructuring, cost-cutting and disposals programme lasting into 2020.) On 9 May 2018, Cabinet Office minister David Lidington told the Committee that the government might consider "reputable providers outside of the United Kingdom" to reduce dependency on current suppliers of key public services; revealing that in some key markets, the top five suppliers had nearly 60% of the market, he said: "that does cause some concern, I would like that market to be bigger." In June 2018, Lidington said the UK government planned procurement reforms, including an extension of the Social Value Act, to give more weight to social value when awarding public contracts and less weight on price. In November 2018, Lidington said the government had lacked key organisational information that could have smoothed management of Carillion's liquidation, and as a contingency plan, had asked government outsourcers (including Interserve, Engie, Capita and Serco) to set out 'living wills' that confirm how services could be managed in the event of a corporate failure.

In the wake of Carillion's liquidation, UK contractors trade association Build UK set out an agenda to reform the construction industry's commercial model, potentially eliminating unfair contract terms, late payment and retentions. (Note: Carillion did not themselves impose retentions on subcontractors, except where their clients used them.) MP Peter Aldous proposed new legislation to reform payment practices and abuse, gaining support from over 60 construction and maintenance trade bodies; on 23 April 2018, ahead of its second reading (twice postponed, then scheduled for 26 October 2018), the Aldous Bill to amend the 1996 Construction Act had gathered the support of over 120 MPs and 76 trade bodies representing over 355,000 companies and many self-employed professionals. The UK government also began consultations on proposals excluding suppliers from major government procurement processes if they cannot demonstrate good payment practices, to reassert the Prompt Payment Code, and to fast-track payment of undisputed invoices submitted by small- and medium-sized businesses within five days.

A private members' bill was introduced by Labour MP Andy Slaughter (backed by the Campaign for Freedom of Information) to make contractors carrying out public works (such as Carillion, G4S and Serco) subject to freedom of information requests. This change, as well as extension of the Social Value Act, were among proposals made by the Trades Union Congress in an April 2018 report on lessons to be learned from Carillion's collapse.

A NEDonBoard event called for tougher requirements on non-executive directors and board members following the collapse of Carillion. (Note: NEDonBoard is a professional body for non-executive directors and board members.)

The Financial Reporting Council proposed reforms to the treatment of listed company directors' share-based bonuses, requiring them to be held for at least five years, and proposed tougher analysis by auditors regarding whether a company remains a 'going concern'.

A year after Carillion's collapse, Work and Pensions Secretary Amber Rudd said company bosses should face imprisonment if they "wilfully or recklessly" mismanaged employee pension funds.

==== End of PFI ====
After the UK government had been forced to take over two Private Finance Initiative hospital building contracts (Midland Metropolitan University Hospital and the Royal Liverpool University Hospital) following Carillion's collapse, the Chancellor of the Exchequer Philip Hammond announced in his October 2018 Budget statement that no further PFI projects would be instigated.

== Operations ==
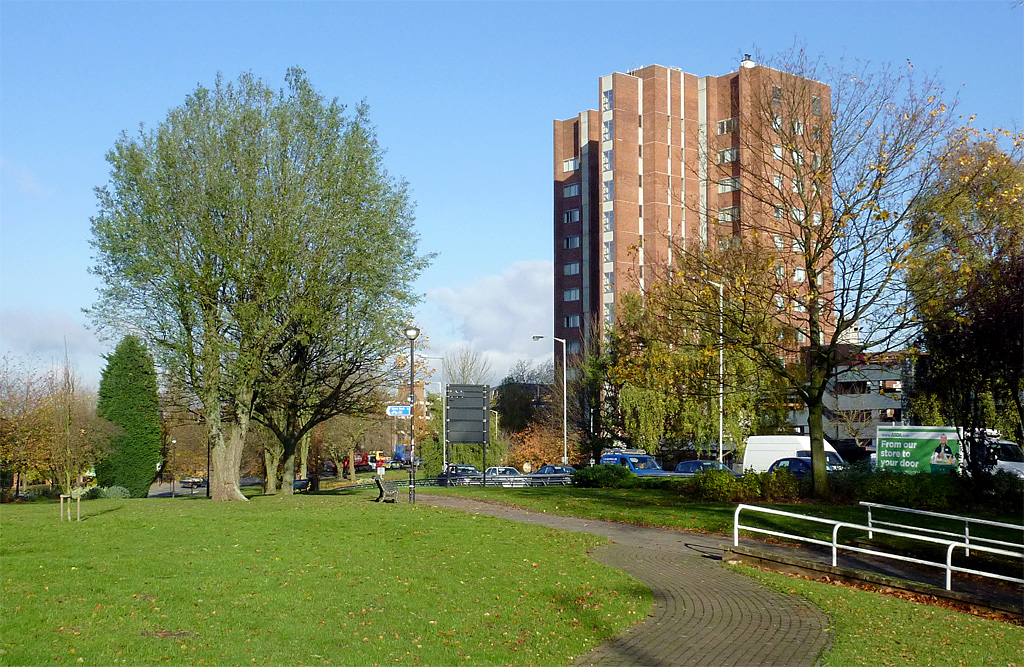
Tower block in Birch Street, Wolverhampton and from July 1999 to March 2015, the head office of Carillion

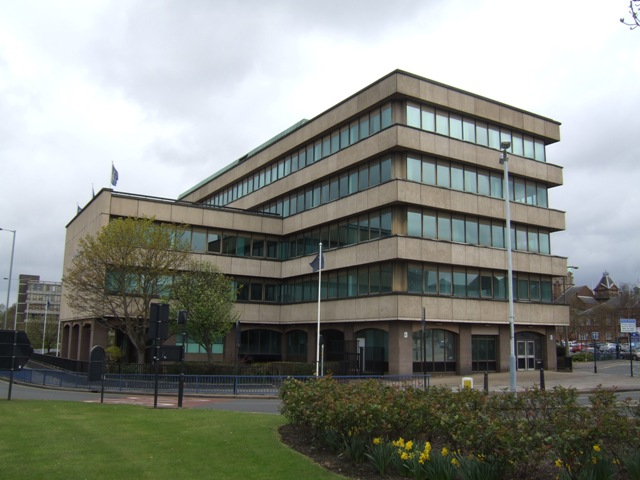
The former Staffordshire Building Society office and, from March 2015, the head office of Carillion

Carillion provided facilities management services (including cleaning, school meals, hospital maintenance, and defence accommodation – it maintained around 50,000 service family homes in 360 defence establishments), provided architectural and engineering design and project management services (through TPS Consult), and undertook a range of construction projects in sectors including: aviation; central government; commercial, retail, residential and leisure; corporate; defence; education; financial services; healthcare, local government; oil and gas; and transport.

Most of its business was in the United Kingdom, but it also operated in several other regions including Canada, the Middle East and the Caribbean. From January 2018, the UK Government was required to provide funding for Carillion's public sector work, which continued despite the company's entry into compulsory liquidation.

Carillion comprised 326 subsidiary companies, joint ventures (a mix of majority and minority shareholdings) and holding companies, 199 in the United Kingdom, plus others in Canada and other countries. Sarah Albon, chief executive of the Insolvency Service told MPs on 30 January 2018 that Carillion had 169 directors in total but poor Carillion record keeping had made determining that number difficult.

In March 2015 Carillion moved its head office from Birch Street in Wolverhampton to the former Staffordshire Building Society offices in Wolverhampton.

=== Board of directors ===
As of 16 January 2018, Carillion plc's board comprised (in order of appointment to board):

- Philip Nevill Green, chairman (director since June 2011)*†
- Andrew Dougal (non-executive director since October 2011)
- Alison Horner (non-executive director since December 2013)*
- Keith Cochrane, interim CEO (director since July 2015)*†
- Sally Morgan, Baroness Morgan of Huyton (non-executive director since July 2017)
- Alan Lovell (non-executive director since November 2017)
- Justin Read (non-executive director since December 2017)

Previous directors included (in order of resignation from board):

- Richard Adam (finance director, appointed April 2007, resigned 31 December 2016)*
- Ceri Powell (non-executive director, appointed April 2014, resigned 31 March 2017)
- Richard Howson (CEO, appointed December 2009, resigned 10 July 2017)*†
- Zafar Khan (finance director, 1 January – 10 September 2017)*
  - Emma Mercer (succeeded Khan as finance director in September 2017, but was not a plc board director)*†

(*The directors marked with an asterisk gave evidence to the House of Commons Business and Work and Pensions select committees on 6 February 2018.
† The directors marked with a cross gave evidence to the Public Accounts Committee on 27 February 2018.)

=== Problem contracts and prosecutions ===
In November 2013, Carillion was fined £180,000 plus £28,551 in costs for breaches of health and safety regulations which led to a motorcyclist being completely paralysed in an accident on the A12 in England. The Health and Safety Executive said that Carillion had failed to put up signs to warn motorists of a road closure in good time.

Its subsidiary Clinicenta had a contract to run a treatment centre at Lister Hospital in Stevenage which was terminated in 2013, after the Care Quality Commission found the unit was not meeting minimum standards.

In January 2016, Carillion was fined $900,000 for failing to clear Canada's Queen Elizabeth Way of snow on two occasions following winter storms in November 2015. In October 2016, Carillion's Canadian operation was convicted and fined $80,000 plus a $20,000 victim surcharge by the Government of Ontario for improperly disposing of waste material in an unapproved area.

In November 2016, it was reported that Nottingham University Hospitals NHS Trust planned to end its estates and facilities services contract, awarded in April 2014 to the company, after nurses had been forced to clean the wards because of a shortage of seventy cleaning staff.

In March 2022, faulty construction by Carillion of Network Rail drainage measures adjacent to a Scottish railway line in 2011-12 was blamed as a significant factor in the Stonehaven derailment, an accident on 12 August 2020 which killed three people.

== Major projects ==
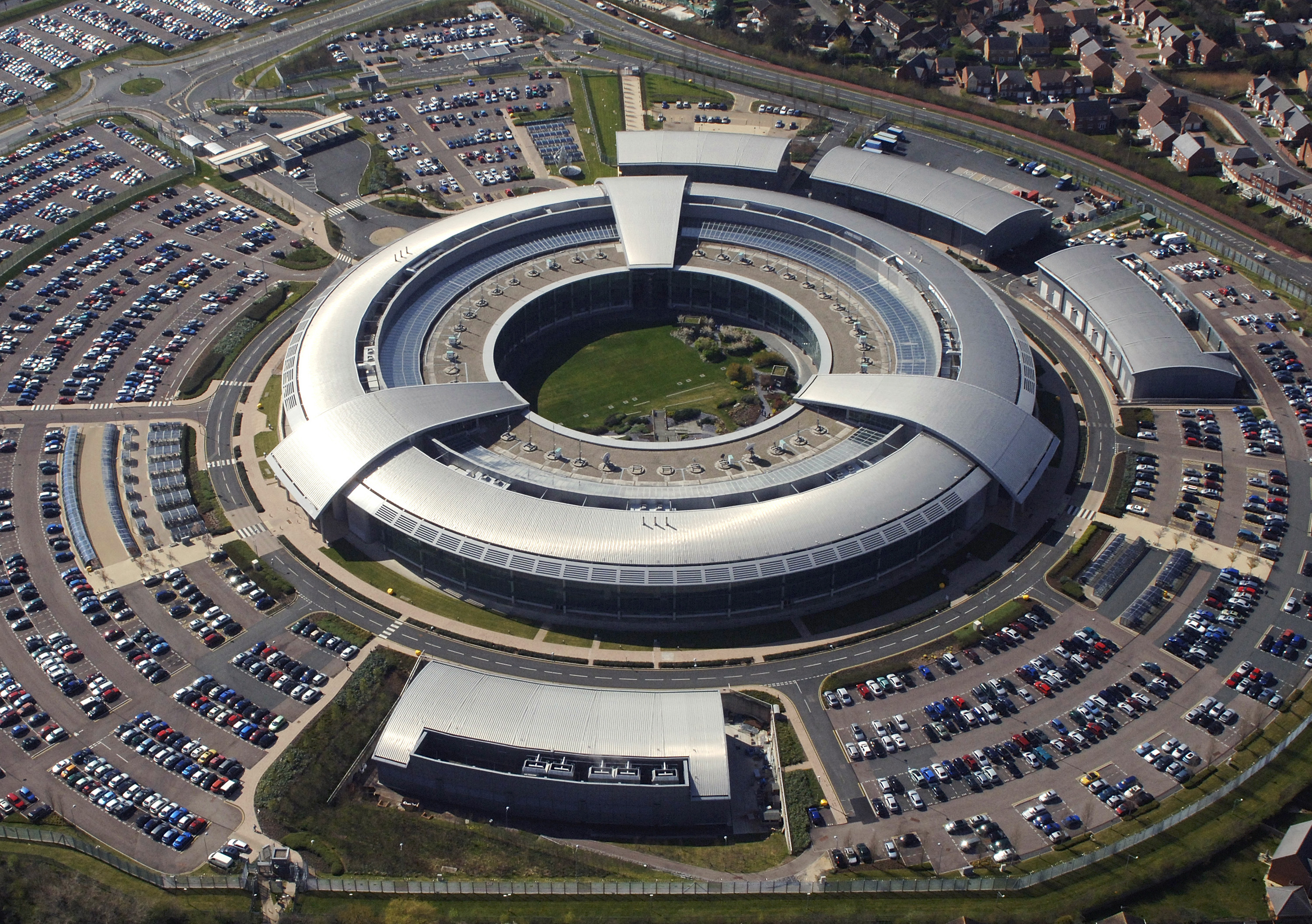
Government Communications Headquarters (2003) built by Carillion

The Yas Hotel Abu Dhabi (2009) built by Carillion

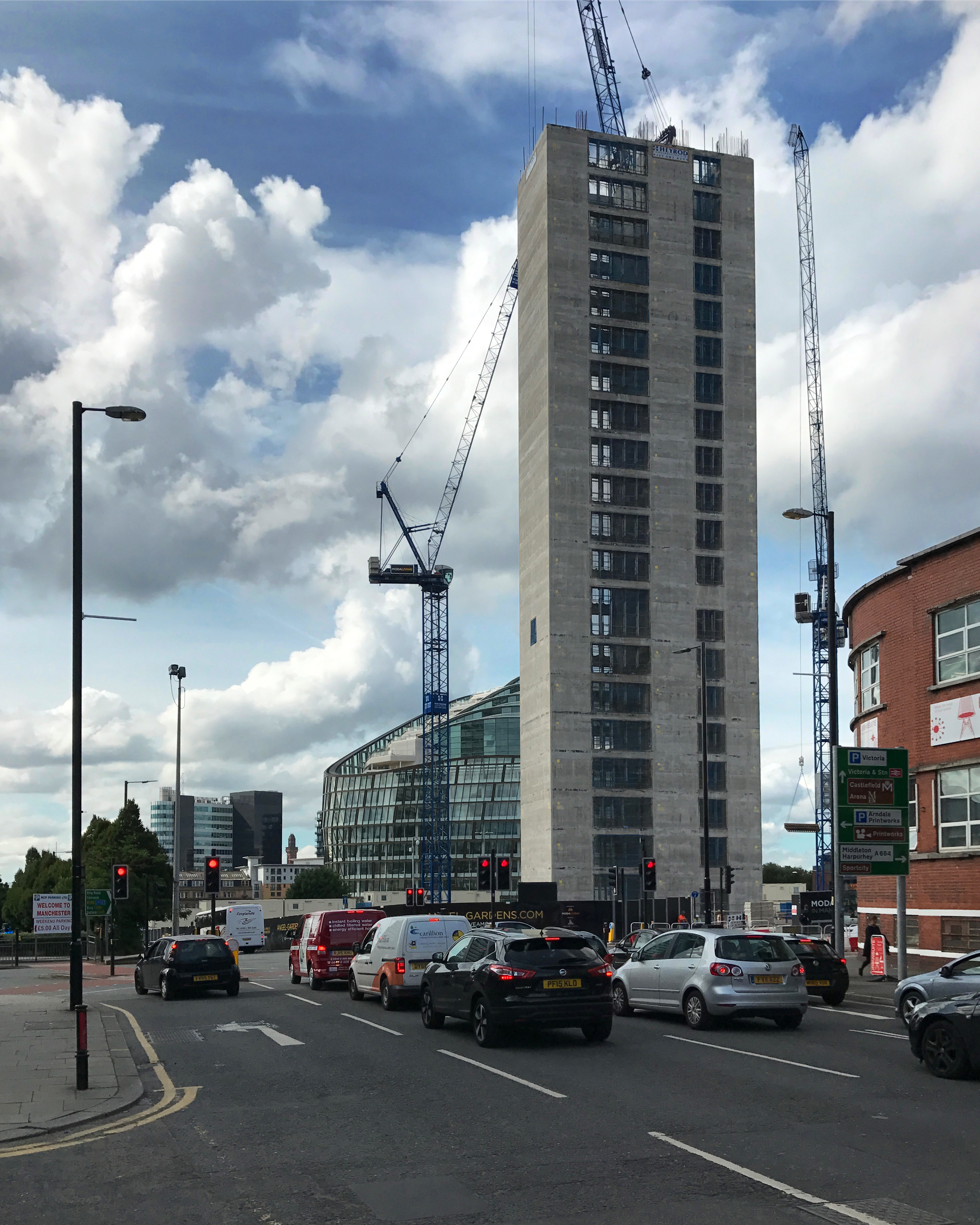
Angel Gardens, Manchester. On-site but incomplete at the time of liquidation.

Major projects involving Carillion have included:

- New facilities for the Royal Opera House (completed in 2000)
- The Tate Modern (completed in 2000)
- Darent Valley Hospital in Kent (completed in 2000)
- Star City in Birmingham (completed in 2000)
- The Grand Mosque in Oman (completed in 2001)
- Harplands Hospital in Stoke-on-Trent (completed in 2001)
- The Copenhagen Metro (completed in 2002)
- The Great Western Hospital in Swindon (completed in 2002)
- The de Havilland campus for the University of Hertfordshire (completed in 2003)
- The M6 Toll (completed in 2003)
- Government Communications Headquarters (GCHQ) (completed in 2003)
- Nottingham Express Transit Phase 1 (completed in 2004)
- Marina Towers, Dubai (completed in 2004)
- The Sheppey Crossing (completed in 2006)
- New facilities for the John Radcliffe Hospital (completed in 2006)
- Beetham Tower Manchester (completed in 2006)
- Royal Ottawa Hospital (completed in 2006)
- High Speed 1 (completed in 2007)
- The Riverside Building at the University Hospital Lewisham (completed in 2007)
- Brampton Civic Hospital in Canada (completed in 2007)
- The Great Northern Tower in Manchester (completed in 2007)
- Dubai Festival City Shopping Centre and InterContinental Hotel facility (completed in 2008)
- Aylesbury Vale Parkway (completed in 2008)
- New facilities at the Queen Alexandra Hospital in Portsmouth (completed in 2009)
- The Yas Hotel Abu Dhabi in Abu Dhabi (completed in 2009)
- New York University Abu Dhabi (completed in 2010)
- Sault Area Hospital (completed in 2010)
- Redevelopment of Northwood Headquarters (completed in 2010)
- The Royal Opera House Muscat (completed in 2011)
- The Rolls Building in London (completed in 2011)
- London Heathrow Terminal 5C (completed in 2011)
- The London Olympics Media Centre (completed in 2011)
- The Ontario Centre of Forensic Sciences in Toronto (completed in 2012)
- Al Bahr Towers in Abu Dhabi (completed in 2012)
- The Majlis Oman (completed in 2013)
- The Library of Birmingham (completed in 2013)
- Cairo Festival City, Cairo (completed in 2013)
- New facilities for Southmead Hospital in Bristol (completed in 2014)
- Union Station reconstruction, Toronto (completed in 2014)
- Redevelopment of the military garrisons of Aldershot and Salisbury Plain (completed in 2014)
- Oakville-Trafalgar Memorial Hospital in Oakville, Canada (completed in 2015)
- Al Jalila Children's Specialty Hospital in Dubai (completed in 2016)
- The Oman Convention and Exhibition Centre Phase 1 (completed in 2016)
- Liverpool FC's Anfield stadium expansion (completed in 2016)
- One Chamberlain Square, Birmingham city centre (completed in 2017)
- New offices for HM Passport Office, Durham (completed in 2017)
- Redevelopment of Battersea Power Station Phase 1 (completed in 2017)
- Msheireb Downtown Doha Phase 1B in Qatar (completed in 2017)
- Former Sunderland brewery site redevelopment (due to complete in 2018; in July 2018, the contract was taken over by Tolent Construction and then, in 2023, by Wates Group)
- Aberdeen Western Peripheral Route (originally due to complete spring 2018, actual completion February 2019)
- New facilities for Royal Liverpool University Hospital (originally due to complete in 2018, actual completion October 2022)
- Midland Metropolitan University Hospital (originally due to complete in 2019, actual completion October 2024)
- High Speed 2 lots C2 and C3, working as part of a joint venture (main construction work was due to start in 2018/9), replaced in joint venture following liquidation by BAM Nuttall and Ferrovial
- Angel Gardens, Manchester (originally due to complete in 2019; following Carillion's liquidation in January 2018, the contract was transferred to Caddick Construction. Actual completion November 2020)

== Awards ==
In 2008, the company secured first place in the category for large and medium-sized companies with high environmental impact in The Sunday Times Best Green Companies Awards and, in 2017, the company received the Queen's Award for Enterprise in the Sustainable Development category.

== See also ==
- ISG Ltd (its 2024 collapse echoed Carillion's)
- KPMG § Carillion audit role
- UK insolvency law
- UK labour law
