= Richard Adam =

English chartered accountant and businessman

- Born: Richard Adam; November 1957 (age 68)
- Education: University of Reading
- Occupation: Chartered Accountant
- Title: Director

Richard Adam (born November 1957) is an English chartered accountant and businessman particularly associated with the financial management of media, construction and property-related companies. He was a board director of construction and services business Carillion from April 2007 to December 2016. After the company went into liquidation in January 2018, Adam was criticised by a Parliamentary select committees report, and the Financial Reporting Council and other regulators started investigations into his conduct. In July 2023, Adam was disqualified from acting as a director of a company for 12.5 years.

== Early life ==
Adam earned a bachelor's degree in mathematics from the University of Reading.

== Career ==
After graduation, Adam became a chartered accountant (he is a fellow of the Institute of Chartered Accountants in England and Wales), and joined KPMG Audit in 1982, later becoming finance director of International Family Entertainment UK (1993-1996) then holding the same roles at Hodder Headline plc (1996-1999) and Associated British Ports (1999-February 2007).

=== Carillion ===
As finance director, Adam served as a board director of construction and services business Carillion from 2 April 2007 to 31 December 2016. He was succeeded by ex-ABP colleague Zafar Khan.

Adam was one of several former Carillion directors who appeared before Parliamentary select committees in early February 2018, and subsequently described as "delusional characters". As further information about pension issues emerged, directors were described as "contemptuous" of their obligations, with Adam said to have "particular questions to answer," particularly after MPs heard he had allegedly described pension payments as a "waste of money". On 26 February 2018, it was reported that Adam had sold £775,921 worth of Carillion shares in March and May 2017 - the latter sale just three months before a Carillion profit warning.

On 17 March 2018, it was reported that the Financial Reporting Council's conduct committee would announce an investigation into the conduct of Richard Adam and Zafar Khan. The investigation, confirmed on 19 March 2018, would focus on the preparation and approval of Carillion's financial reports for 2014, 2015 and 2016, and the six months to 30 June 2017, as well as provision of other financial information from 2014 to 2017. In June 2018, a Financial Conduct Authority investigation (announced on 3 January 2018) was extended to allegations of insider trading in Carillion shares prior to its trading update on 10 July 2017.

In the final report of the Parliamentary inquiry into the collapse of Carillion, published on 16 May 2018, Adam was severely criticised, described as "the architect of Carillion’s aggressive accounting policies". The report continued:

"He, more than anyone else, would have been aware of the unsustainability of the company’s approach. His voluntary departure at the end of 2016 was, for him, perfectly timed. He then sold all his Carillion shares for £776,000 just before the wheels began very publicly coming off and their value plummeted. These were the actions of a man who knew exactly where the company was heading once it was no longer propped up by his accounting tricks."

The report also recommended that the Insolvency Service should consider whether the former Carillion directors, including Adam, could be disqualified from acting as a director. On 6 August 2018, at the end of "the largest ever trading liquidation in the UK", the Official Receiver said investigations into the cause of the company's failure, including the conduct of its directors, continued.

Adam disputed the select committees' assertion that he considered that payments into Carillion's pension schemes were a "waste of money". The committees' response said the presented evidence led them to this "inescapable conclusion", which was "entirely in keeping with the Carillion board’s short-termist, cash-chasing, dividend-plumping approach."

In a Channel 4 Dispatches programme aired on 22 August 2018, Adam was criticised by former Carillion head of recruitment Jon Hull for creating "a culture of fear and confusion" and described as "very aloof ... very controlling". In the same programme, financial analyst Stephen Rawlinson described Adam's approach to the company's internal financial reporting: "When the numbers didn’t come to where he wanted them to be he would simply say to the management ‘Go back and do the numbers again.’" Responding to the documentary, Adam said he did not recognise these views, and told the documentary makers that throughout his time at Carillion all of its accounts were approved by the board and audited.

The parliamentary process and findings have been questioned by former Carillion executives as lacking in objectivity and thoroughness, treating a highly complex situation in an incomplete manner. Former Carillion CEO Richard Howson (whose letters were published by the select committees on 12 July 2018), contends that Carillion was a victim of its public sector clients and that "any analysis as to the causes of the failure of Carillion is not complete without looking at the way in which government and the wider public sector procured services from Carillion and failed to administer payments."

In November 2020, the Financial Conduct Authority said some Carillion directors had "acted recklessly" and released "misleadingly positive" market updates before it collapsed. As a result, the FCA said it had sent notices to some (unnamed) former Carillion directors warning of possible enforcement action (possible sanctions include public censure, fines and suspensions from holding certain positions). In January 2021, the Insolvency Service said it would seek to ban eight former Carillion directors, including Adam, from holding senior boardroom positions. In July 2022, the FCA announced it had decided to fine Adam £318,000. The former director appealed against the penalty, and in July 2025, it was announced the appeal would be heard in February 2026. In July 2023, it was announced by the Insolvency Service that Adam had been disqualified from acting as a director of a company for 12.5 years. In January 2026, Adam withdrew his FCA challenge and agreed a fine reduced by 10% to £232,800, reflecting his cooperation with FCA investigations and an adjustment following a recalculation of his earnings.

=== Other directorships ===
Adam was a non-executive director of SSL International plc from November 2003 to October 2010, of Zattikka plc from April 2012 to August 2013, and of Wincanton plc from June to September 2014.

He was also a non-executive director of Countrywide plc from June 2014 to October 2017 and of Countryside Properties plc from April 2015 to October 2017.

He was appointed a director of FirstGroup plc in February 2017. After 22.7% of FirstGroup investors voted against appointing Adam as a non-executive director in July 2017, he resigned from the board in September 2017.
