= Al Jalila Children's Specialty Hospital =

- Location in Dubai

Geography
- Location: Dubai
- Coordinates: 25.225°N 55.3189°E

Organisation
- Type: Children's hospital

Services
- Beds: 200

History
- Founded: 2016

Links
- Website: www.aljalilachildrens.ae
- Lists: Hospitals in Dubai

Al Jalila Children's Specialty Hospital (Al Jalila Children's) is a children's hospital ordered to be built by Mohammed bin Rashid Al Maktoum as a gift to the children of the UAE to celebrate his daughter Al Jalila’s first birthday on 2 December 2008.

== History ==
It was announced in December 2008 that the hospital would be located in Dubai and would have 200 beds. The hospital was designed by Italian architectural firm Studio Altieri International. The contractor assigned for fencing, shoring excavation and piling was A.P.C.C., and the contractor for construction of the facility itself was Al-Futtaim Carillion LLC. It was designed to be a 'smart hospital' that integrates IT and design features to create a positive and entertaining environment for patients and families. It opened in October 2016.

== Clinical activities ==
The hospital area is 57,965 square meters and the hospital has over 3,750 pieces of biomedical equipment and fixtures.

== Awards ==
- Future Projects – Health Award at the World Architecture Festival 2009
- Hospital Build Award 2011 for Best Sustainable Hospital Project
- Hamdan Award for an Outstanding Clinical Department in the Public Sector in UAE in 2022
