= Philip Rogerson =

British businessman (1945–2022)

- Born: Philip Graham Rogerson; 1 January 1945
- Died: 19 May 2022 (aged 77)
- Occupations: Chairman, Bunzl; Chairman, De La Rue
- Board member of: Bunzl; De La Rue

Philip Graham Rogerson (1 January 1945 – 19 May 2022) was a British businessman who served as the chairman of Bunzl and De La Rue.

== Early life ==
Philip Graham Rogerson was born on 1 January 1945 to Henry and Florence Rogerson. He was a chartered accountant.

== Career ==
Rogerson was chairman of Carillion from May 2005 to May 2014. He served as chairman of Bunzl from March 2010, and chairman of De La Rue from July 2012.

== Personal life and death ==
Rogerson lived in the UK. He died on 19 May 2022, at the age of 77.
