= Ceri Powell =

Welsh geologist and businesswoman

- Born: Ceri Michele Powell; July 1963 (age 63)
- Education: University of Liverpool; Cardiff University
- Occupation: Businesswoman
- Title: Former MD, Brunei Shell Petroleum (2017-2020)
- Spouse: Ajay Shah

Ceri Michele Powell (born July 1963) is a Welsh geologist and businesswoman who worked for Royal Dutch Shell from 1990 to 2020.

== Education ==
The daughter of a manager at Milford Haven oil refinery (and chairman of the Pembrokeshire Coast National Park Authority), Powell grew up in Pembrokeshire and trained as a geologist. Inspired by the example of Dame May Ogilvie Gordon, one of the first female geologists, Powell studied for a BSc in geology at the University of Liverpool and then pursued a PhD (awarded in 1990), sponsored by Shell, at Cardiff University, studying inversion tectonics and the reactivation of extensional faults as Compressional thrusts.

== Shell career ==
After joining Shell (her first post was as a regional geologist in the central and southern North Sea), Powell worked in the UK, Angola, Malaysia, the Netherlands (she was appointed to head Shell's competitive intelligence team in 2000, and then became business advisor to the Shell's Upstream CEO), a ground-breaking position at the time before business advisors were the norm. She was appointed as VP exploration for the Middle East, Caspian and South Asia from 2004 to 2008, and represented Shell on boards of multiple joint ventures in the regions, including in the Kingdom of Saudi Arabia and Kazakhstan. She was then made VP of Global Strategy for Shell until late 2009.

She was appointed Executive Vice President Exploration, Shell Upstream International in 2009, then in 2013 became the Global Head of Exploration. She deeply believes in a visible personal safety leadership presence - "Boots on the Ground", as demonstrated in remote operations from Albania to Myanmar. In 2017, she was appointed as managing director of Brunei Shell Petroleum and Country Chair of Shell companies in Brunei, accountable for production of over 300,000boe/day, 4000 staff with 18,000 business partners, under the guidance of the chairman of BSP, Crown Prince Haji Al-Muhtadee Billah.

In August 2020, Powell stepped down as MD of BSP and country chair after 31 years of an international career.

== Other roles ==
Powell sat for three years on the United Nations advisory board for Sustainable Energy for All, chaired by the UN Secretary General.

She has twice featured on the Fortune Magazine Most Powerful Women list, in 2013, ranked number 21 in 2014, and has been a strong advocate of increasing female involvement in industry. In 2015, she was described as one of the top six most powerful women in oil and gas.

In November 2014 Powell was awarded an honorary doctorate from Heriot-Watt University for services to geoscience and in 2015 she was made an honorary fellow at her alma mater, Cardiff University.

In April 2014, Powell was appointed as a non-executive director of Carillion serving on the audit, remuneration, nomination and business integrity committees, and chairing the sustainability committee in 2015. She resigned with effect from 31 March 2017. Following the company's 2018 liquidation, in January 2021 the Insolvency Service said it would seek to ban eight former Carillion directors, including Powell, from holding senior boardroom positions. However, a trial due to start on 16 October 2023 was cancelled after the Insolvency Service decided it was not in the public interest to pursue Powell and four others.

== Personal life ==
Powell is married to Ajay Shah, another senior energy industry gas marketing professional, and, after living in The Hague and Brunei she now lives in Singapore. She also has a UK base in the Cotswolds. Her non-work interests include skiing, scuba diving, yoga, and the connection between geology and gardening, having gained her Royal Horticultural Society accreditation in 2013.
