= Project Allenby Connaught =

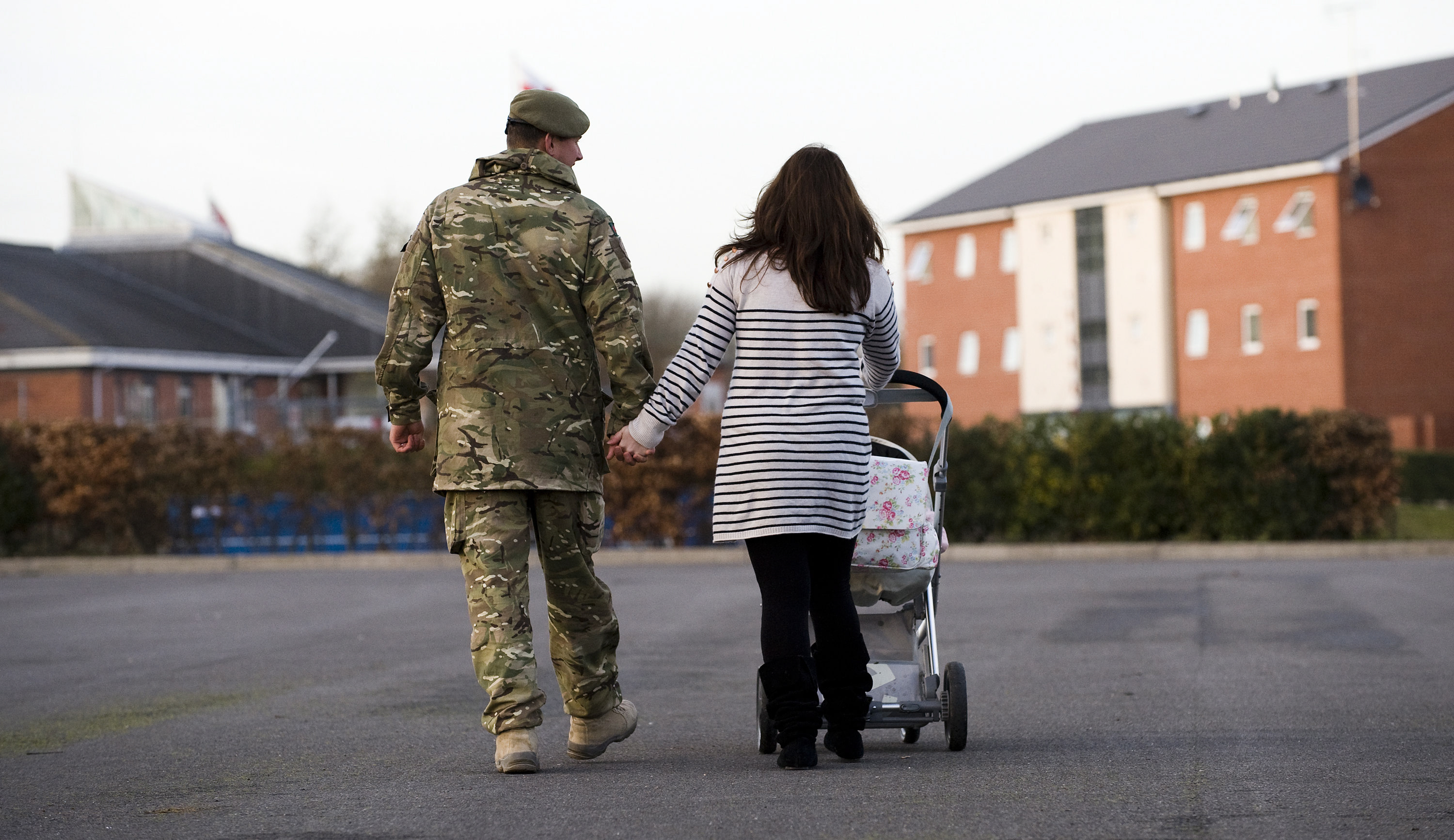
New military accommodation for soldiers at Tidworth Camp

Project Allenby Connaught is a scheme begun in 2006 to redevelop the military garrisons of Aldershot and Salisbury Plain in the United Kingdom. The project is named after Lord Allenby who served as a cavalry commander on Salisbury Plain, and the Duke of Connaught who was Commander-in-Chief at Aldershot Command.

== History ==
In April 2006 Aspire Defence won a 35-year private finance initiative contract known as Project Allenby Connaught to provide over 500 new or refurbished buildings and deliver a range of services across the garrisons of Aldershot and Salisbury Plain, from construction to catering, stores management, transport, building maintenance, grounds maintenance and cleaning. These improvements, which were delivered by joint ventures of British company Carillion and American company KBR at a cost of £1.6 billion, aimed to improve the quality of life for 18,000 soldiers living and working at the garrisons and were completed in December 2014. Funds managed by Innisfree and by InfraRed Capital Partners were also invested in the project. Sites around Salisbury Plain where improvements took place included Bulford, Larkhill, Perham Down, Tidworth and Warminster.

In November 2016 Aspire Defence won an extension to the contract under which it would deliver a further 130 new buildings, as well as extensions and alterations to existing buildings, as part of the Army Basing Programme in order to allow the return of troops from Germany by 2019.

Following the January 2018 collapse of Carillion, KBR acquired Carillion's interests in Aspire Defence.

== See also ==
- Project MoDEL
