= Zafar Khan (businessman) =

British accountant and finance director (b. 1968)

- Born: Zafar Iqbal Khan; August 1968 (age 57)
- Occupation: Businessman
- Title: former finance director, Carillion
- Term: January–September 2017
- Predecessor: Richard Adam
- Successor: Emma Mercer

Zafar Iqbal Khan (born August 1968), is a British accountant and businessman, and was the finance director of Carillion from 1 January to 11 September 2017, shortly before it went into liquidation in January 2018. In July 2023, Khan was disqualified from acting as a director of a company for 11 years.

== Career ==
Khan trained as a chartered accountant with Ernst & Young.

Khan followed Richard Adam from Associated British Ports joining Carillon in 2011, as finance director for the Middle East and North Africa business, and was its group financial controller from 2013. Khan was the finance director of Carillion from August 2016 to 11 September 2017 (and a main board director from 1 January to 11 September 2017), and succeeded "long-serving" Richard Adam, who had been finance director since 2007.

Khan was succeeded as chief financial office by Emma Mercer, who had worked for Carillion in a decade-long career. Khan would continue to receive his salary of £425,000 until July 2018.

Khan was one of six Carillion directors who appeared before House of Commons select committee hearings on 6 February 2018. Rachel Reeves, chair of the business committee, suggested Khan "fell asleep at the wheel" during his tenure. Khan told the committee he thought he had "spooked the board with results of the contract review".

On 17 March 2018, it was reported that the Financial Reporting Council's conduct committee would announce an investigation into the conduct of Richard Adam and Zafar Khan (both members of the Institute of Chartered Accountants in England and Wales). The investigation, confirmed on 19 March 2018, would focus on the preparation and approval of Carillion's financial reports for 2014, 2015 and 2016, and the six months to 30 June 2017, as well as provision of other financial information from 2014 to 2017.

Khan was criticised in the final report of the Parliamentary inquiry into the collapse of Carillion, published on 16 May 2018. The report concluded:

"Zafar Khan failed to get a grip on Carillion’s aggressive accounting policies or make any progress in reducing the company’s debt. He took on the role of Finance Director when the company was already in deep trouble, but he should not be absolved of responsibility. He signed off the 2016 accounts that presented an extraordinarily optimistic view of the company’s health, and were soon exposed as such."

The report also recommended that the Insolvency Service should consider whether the former Carillion directors, including Khan, could be disqualified from acting as a director. In November 2020, the Financial Conduct Authority said some Carillion directors had "acted recklessly" and released "misleadingly positive" market updates before it collapsed. As a result, the FCA said it had sent notices to some (unnamed) former Carillion directors warning of possible enforcement action (possible sanctions include public censure, fines and suspensions from holding certain positions). In January 2021, the Insolvency Service said it would seek to ban eight former Carillion directors, including Khan, from holding senior boardroom positions. In July 2022, the FCA announced it had decided to fine Khan £154,400. The former director appealed against the penalty, and in July 2025, it was announced the appeal would be heard in February 2026. In July 2023, the Insolvency Service announced that Khan had been disqualified from acting as a director of a company for 11 years.

In July 2025, Khan was reported to be working as a self-employed consultant.

In January 2026, Khan withdrew his FCA challenge and agreed a fine reduced by 10% to £138,900, reflecting his cooperation with FCA investigations.
