= Van Elle =

British rail infrastructure company

Van Elle Limited
- Industry: Deep foundation, Track (rail transport)
- Founded: 1984; 42 years ago
- Headquarters: Nottinghamshire, East Midlands, United Kingdom
- Revenue: £43.1m UK (2016)
- Net income: £3.2m UK (2016)
- Parent: Strabag
- Website: www.van-elle.co.uk

Van Elle is an English piling and rail infrastructure company based in Nottinghamshire, between Pinxton and Kirkby-in-Ashfield. Once listed on the sub market of the London Stock Exchange AIM, the company was acquired by Austrian contractor Strabag in June 2026.

== History ==
The company was founded in 1984 by the structural engineer Michael Ellis, who served in senior leadership roles at Van Elle for many years. Three years later, Van Elle purchased the Hoopsafe System, which it subsequently developed into the Smartfoot precast concrete foundation beam system. In 1997, the company acquired A&G Stevenson, which it promptly rebranded as A&G Drilling and Grouting and operated as Van Elle's ground stabilisation unit.

In 2003, Van Elle was subject to a management buyout that was centred around a number of the firm's senior directors. That same year, the firm formed a new unit, Van Elle Geotechnical Services, to conduct ground investigation and pile testing, and established a Nottinghamshire-based precast concrete production centre. Three years later, a dedicated transport division was established. In 2012, Van Elle Rail was formed.

In June 2015, it was announced that Van Elle’s annual turnover had risen 57 percent from 2014's £46 million to £72.5 million for the year to April 2015. Furthermore, profit more than tripled, from £2.8 million to £9 million, while headcount grew from around 300 to over 400.

In October 2016, the company was floated on the AIM sub market of the London Stock Exchange, achieving a market capitalisation of £80 million; Van Elle was forecasting revenues for 2016 approaching £85 million. Two months later, Ellis stepped down from the chairman's position with the intention of retiring.

In early 2017, the firm's turnover dropped on account of delays in several of its rail projects. Around this time, Van Elle was reportedly negotiating with multiple firms towards their potential acquisition.

In November 2017, Ellis started an attempt to remove the company's chief executive Jon Fenton and a senior independent director, Robin Williams, citing concerns about the company's management, departures of key staff and financial forecasts. During the dispute, the company faced questions after it wrote off more than £330,000 of work building a new house for Fenton (who announced he would be stepping down from the company due to a family illness), while Ellis accused Van Elle directors of making personal attacks ahead of a shareholders' vote in December on returning him to the board. The board rebutted Ellis's criticism, accusing him of damaging the company. At the shareholders meeting, Ellis's bid to return to the board was rejected. In September 2018, shareholders rejected proposed pay rises for the company's directors.

In January 2018, the company warned it would potentially lose £1.6 million as a result of the collapse of Carillion, for whom it was working as a subcontractor on projects for Network Rail. Van Elle also reported uncertainty relating to £2.5 million worth of future work for Network Rail, with a potential impact on future financial results; it was due to this uncertainty that work was halted on multiple Network Rail sites until a new agreement was in place.

Interim results for the year to 31 October 2017, showed the firm made an underlying pre tax profit of £5.4 million on a turnover of £52.6 million. In January 2019, Van Elle reported pretax profits down 54 percent to £2.4 million as turnover fell 18 percent to £42.9 million in the six months to 31 October 2018, which its CEO attributed Carillion's collapse for the profit slump. Two further profit warnings followed as its share-price halved ahead of its annual results announcement in July 2019.

Results for the year to 30 April 2019 showed a 56.5 percent fall in pre tax profits (to £4 million from £9.2 million) as turnover dropped from £103.9 million to £88.5 million; during the year, the company's share price fell from 82p to 35p, valuing the company at £29 million. The 2020-2021 COVID-19 pandemic caused Van Elle to declare a loss of £700,000 for the six months to 31 October 2020, with revenues down over 20 percent to £38.3 million. In the year to April 2021, the firm reported a pre-tax loss of £1.4 million, following its £2.2 million loss in 2019, with revenues stable at £84 million. However, the company returned to profitability in the half year to October 2021.

In October 2023, Van Elle strengthened its presence in southeast England through the acquisition of rival firm Rock & Alluvium from Galliford Try in a deal worth up to £3.8 million. In May 2024, the company announced several cost efficiency measures, including job cuts. In October 2024, the firm purchased the Scottish-based drilling specialist Albion via a transaction valued up to £3.5 million.

In January 2025, Van Elle signed an eight-year partnership agreement with the electrical transmission contractor Wood Transmission & Distribution, which was reportedly valued in excess of £30 million. In May of that year, it enacted a £2.9 million five-year agreement with WS Specialist Logistics Limited, under which Van Elle transferred its heavy goods vehicle (HGV) fleet. In December 2025, it was announced that, via a £2.5 million transaction, the firm would dispose of its share capital and assets of Van Elle Canada Inc.

In April 2026, the Austrian contractor Strabag submitted a £58.8 million offer to purchase Van Elle; two months later, with the support of the majority of shareholders, the company was acquired. Shortly after the transaction's completion, Van Elle's senior management team was reorganised, which included then-CEO Mark Cutler stepping down.
