= National Airlines Council of Canada =

The National Airlines Council of Canada is a trade association representing Canada's four largest passenger air carriers. It was founded by Air Canada, Jazz Air LP, WestJet and Air Transat, and officially incorporated on September 4, 2008.
