= Alison Horner =

British businesswoman

- Born: Alison Jane Horner; June 1966 (age 60)
- Education: University of Manchester; Manchester Business School
- Occupation: businesswoman
- Title: CEO, Tesco's Asia business
- Board member of: Tesco, Carillion

Alison Jane Horner (born June 1966) is a British businesswoman, and, until it was sold in 2020, was the CEO of the Asian arm of the Tesco supermarket chain.

== Early life ==
Alison Jane Horner was born in June 1966. She earned a bachelor's degree in chemistry from the University of Manchester, and an MBA from Manchester Business School.

== Career ==
=== Tesco ===
Horner joined Tesco as a personnel manager in 1999 and was on Tesco's executive committee from 2011.

In October 2013, Horner became a founding member of The Guardian's Women in Leadership network. in 2015, she became a member of Alliance Manchester Business School's advisory board.

Horner was Tesco' chief people officer (chief human resources officer) of Tesco until May 2018, when she was promoted to be chief executive of Tesco's Asia business in Malaysia and Thailand, until it was sold in late 2020. She was set to step down in February 2021 after 22 years with Tesco.

=== Carillion non-executive role ===
Horner was a non-executive director of Carillion from December 2013, chairing the remuneration committee from June 2014. As of 30 December 2016 her basic compensation was £61,000. After the company went into liquidation in January 2018, Horner was one of the non-executive directors who gave evidence to the House of Commons Business and Work and Pensions select committees on 6 February 2018. In the final report of the Parliamentary Inquiry, published on 16 May 2018, Horner was criticised by MPs; the report concluded:

"... Alison Horner presided over growing salaries and bonuses at the top of the company as its performance faltered. In her evidence to us, she sought to justify her approach by pointing to industry standards, the guidance of advisors, and conversations with shareholders. She failed to demonstrate to us any sense of challenge to the advice she was given, any concern about the views of stakeholders, or any regret at the largesse at the top of Carillion. Ms Horner continues to hold the role of Chief People Officer of Tesco, where she has responsibilities to more than half a million employees. We hope that, in that post, she will reflect on the lessons learned from Carillion and her role in its collapse."

In January 2021, the Insolvency Service said it would seek to ban eight former Carillion directors, including Horner, from holding senior boardroom positions. However, a trial due to start on 16 October 2023 was cancelled after the Insolvency Service decided it was not in the public interest to pursue Horner and four others.
