= Innisfree Ltd =

British fund management company

Innisfree Ltd is a fund management company based in the United Kingdom which manages substantial interests in private finance initiative (PFI) schemes in the UK, Canada, Sweden and The Netherlands. It invests funds in social infrastructure projects such as hospitals and schools on behalf of institutional investors such as local authority pension funds. The company has a portfolio of 53 projects with a capital value of over £18 billion.

== Role ==
The company was founded by David Metter in 1995 and has raised over £2.3 billion to date. Currently, it has over £1.7 billion under management in four long term income funds. These funds have lives of 35 years or more which matches the length of a typical PFI contract of between 25 and 30 years and reflects Innisfree's policy to remain a long term partner in these projects.

== PFI schemes ==
=== National Health Service ===
The company is a large external investor in NHS hospitals:

- St Bartholomew's Hospital
- Royal Derby Hospital
- University Hospital Coventry
- Whiston Hospital
- King's Mill Hospital
- Royal Victoria Infirmary

=== Defence ===
Project Allenby Connaught, at £1.8 billion, is one of the UK's largest PFI projects. The 35-year contract with Aspire Defence was let in 2006. It involves servicing and refurbishment of buildings on 800 ha of army land around Salisbury Plain and in Aldershot. Aspire Defence Limited is 37.5% owned by "funds managed by Innisfree"; the other shareholders are InfraRed Capital Partners (17.5%) and KBR (45%).
