= John McDonough (businessman) =

British businessman (1951–2023)

- Born: November 1951
- Died: 17 September 2023 (aged 71)
- Education: Imperial College London
- Occupation: Businessman
- Title: CEO, Carillion
- Term: 2001–2011
- Predecessor: Sir Neville Simms
- Successor: Richard Howson

John McDonough CBE (November 1951 – 17 September 2023) was a British businessman who was CEO of Carillion from January 2001 to December 2011.

== Early life ==
John McDonough was born in November 1951. He earned a degree in mechanical engineering from Imperial College London in 1972.

== Career ==
McDonough started his career at Massey Ferguson. He joined Johnson Controls in 1991, as UK managing director, Automotive Systems Group (ASG), rising to vice president, integrated facilities management, Europe, the Middle East and Africa, and a member of the senior management team, until his appointment as Carillion CEO.

McDonough was CEO of Carillion from January 2001 to December 2011 and he led the company's transition of focus from construction to services. He retired in December 2011, having reached the age of 60, and was succeeded as CEO by the chief operating officer, Richard Howson.

McDonough was chairman of the CBI's Construction Council from 2008 to 2011 and vice-chairman of the CBI's Public Services' Strategy Board. He was also chairman of Vesuvius, an engineered ceramics company, from October 2012 to April 2022, and of Sunbird Group, a construction services business operating in East Africa, from September 2014 to August 2022.

== Death ==
McDonough died on 17 September 2023, at the age of 71.

== Honours ==
McDonough was appointed a CBE in 2011, for services to industry.
