= Andrew Dougal =

British businessman

Andrew James Harrower Dougal (born September 1951) is a British businessman particularly associated with the financial and general management of industrial companies.

== Career ==
Dougal worked with Hanson plc, the former Anglo-American diversified industrial group, in a range of general and financial management roles, rising to be group finance director, from 1986 until 1997 when the Hanson demerger took place. He was then appointed chief executive of Hanson and he remained in that role until his retirement in 2002. After the demerger, Hanson focused on building materials, becoming the world's biggest aggregates supplier and the second largest supplier of ready-mixed concrete. Dougal left Hanson with a large pay-off (variously reported at between £400,000 and £660,000, plus a pension top-up of £636,700) after quitting the group to "rebalance" his life.

Dougal is a member of the Institute of Chartered Accountants of Scotland and was formerly a member of its Council and has advised on the responsibilities of non-executive directors.

== Non-executive director roles ==
After his retirement from Hanson, Dougal became a portfolio non-executive director. He was a director of Taylor Wimpey, Taylor Woodrow (2002–2011) and Creston plc (2006–2015), chairing the audit committee in all three. He has also been a non-executive director of Premier Farnell (resigning in 2015) and BPB plc.

Dougal was appointed a non-executive director of Carillion plc in October 2011, chairing its audit committee, and was a member of the board in the run-up to Carillion going into liquidation on 15 January 2018. In January 2021, the Insolvency Service said it would seek to ban eight former Carillion directors, including Dougal, from holding senior boardroom positions. However, a trial due to start on 16 October 2023 was cancelled after the Insolvency Service decided it was not in the public interest to continue the proceedings against the former directors including Dougal.

He was a non-executive director of Victrex plc (appointed March 2015), but resigned in February 2018 after being included on an Investment Association listing following the liquidation of Carillion.
