= Letko Brosseau =

Investment Fund

Letko, Brosseau & Associates Inc.
- Company type: Private
- Industry: Financial services
- Founded: 1987; 39 years ago
- Founders: Daniel Brosseau; Peter Letko
- Headquarters: Montreal, Quebec, Canada
- Area served: Canada
- Products: Investment funds
- Services: Investment management
- AUM: ▲C$19 billion (2021)
- Number of employees: 84
- Website: www.lba.ca

Letko, Brosseau & Associates Inc. is a Canadian investment management firm. As of 2021, the firm managed $19 billion in assets for more than 420 institutional investors and several thousand private clients.

The firm has offices in Montreal, Toronto and Calgary. As of 2021, Letko Brosseau has added $13.2 billion in excess return over the weighted average of all clients' benchmarks since inception.

== History ==
The company was founded in 1987 by Daniel Brosseau and Peter Letko who met while working at the investment division of CN.

Letko Brosseau exited the ownership of WestJet in 2019, after Onex Corporation took the company private for $31 a share. It was once a significant investor in the ill-fated British construction firm Carillion.

In December, 2019, the firm rejected Jim Pattison's $16-a-share cash bid to acquire lumber company Canfor, saying the offer undervalued the company. Letko Brosseau held 4.8% of Canfor stock as of December, 2019.

Letko Brosseau has been a major shareholder of Air Transat for many years owning nearly 20% of the company, while currently owning 12%. Letko Brosseau helped guide the firm through acquisition negotiations with Air Canada which had raised its offer from $14 per share to $18 per share in 2019, the deal fell through in 2021 due to regulatory issues in the EU as well as impacts of COVID-19 on travel.
