= Richard Howson =

Former Carillion CEO

- Born: Richard John Howson; August 1968 (age 57)
- Education: Settle College
- Alma mater: Leeds Polytechnic
- Occupation: Businessman
- Title: former CEO, Carillion
- Term: December 2011 - July 2017
- Predecessor: John McDonough
- Successor: Keith Cochrane (interim CEO)
- Board member of: Wood Group
- Spouse: Geri Howson
- Children: 2 sons

Richard John Howson (born August 1968) is a British businessman, and the former chief executive (CEO) of Carillion, a British multinational facilities management and construction services company that went into liquidation in January 2018. Howson's "misguided self-assurance" was said to have contributed to the company's collapse. In October 2023, Howson was disqualified from being a director of a UK company for eight years for his conduct as a director of Carillion; he was later fined £237,700 for his reckless breaching of financial rules.

== Early life ==
Howson was educated at Settle College, and earned a bachelor's degree in construction management from Leeds Polytechnic.

== Career ==
=== Early career ===
Howson worked at Balfour Beatty, Bovis, and Tarmac before becoming operations director for the Carillion Building business in 1999. In March 2004 he was promoted to national construction director on the Carillion Building senior management team, before becoming managing director of Carillion Rail in 2006, and then managing director of Carillion's Middle East and North African operations in 2007. Howson was appointed chief operating officer of Carillion in September 2010.

=== CEO of Carillion (2011-2017) ===
Howson was appointed as chief executive officer of Carillion in December 2011. He stepped down in July 2017, following a profits warning that led to the company's shares falling almost 40%, with Keith Cochrane temporarily taking on the role. Howson was asked to return his bonus, following the announcement of an £845 million impairment charge in its construction services division under his leadership at Carillion. On 29 September 2017, it was revealed that Carillion's losses for the six months ended 30 June 2017 totaled £1.15 billion, following a further write-down of £200 million, this time in its support services division. On 15 January 2018, Carillion went into compulsory liquidation. The company is under formal investigation by the Financial Conduct Authority for the term Howson was CEO.

After giving evidence on 6 February 2018, Howson was one of several former Carillion directors described as "delusional characters" by House of Commons Select Committee chairs Frank Field (Work and Pensions) and Rachel Reeves (Business, Energy and Industrial Strategy). During evidence, the company claimed it was owed £200m in relation to the Msheireb Downtown Doha project in Qatar, and Howson said he felt like "a bailiff" in chasing the debt. (Howson and the board's claim was disputed by Msheireb Properties, who were said to be considering a £200m claim against Carillion.)

Carillion investors said the board focused more on their pay than the company's performance, with the protection of directors' pay extending to the creation of a secret bank account for Howson's share-related bonuses.

In the final report of the Parliamentary inquiry into the collapse of Carillion, published on 16 May 2018, Howson was severely criticised, described as "the figurehead for a business model that was doomed to fail". The report continued:

"... under him it careered progressively out of control. His misguided self-assurance obscured an apparent lack of interest in, or understanding of, essential detail, or any recognition that Carillion was a business crying out for challenge and reform. Right to the end, he remained confident that he could have saved the company had the board not finally decided to remove him. Instead, Mr Howson should accept that, as the longstanding leader who took Carillion to the brink, he was part of the problem rather than part of the solution."

The report also recommended that the Insolvency Service should consider whether the former Carillion directors, including Howson, could be disqualified from acting as a director.

The parliamentary process and findings have been questioned by former Carillion executives as lacking in objectivity and thoroughness, treating a highly complex situation in an incomplete manner. Howson (whose letters were published by the select committees on 12 July 2018) contends that Carillion was a victim of its public sector clients and that “any analysis as to the causes of the failure of Carillion is not complete without looking at how government and the wider public sector procured services from Carillion and failed to administer payments.”

In November 2020, the Financial Conduct Authority said some Carillion directors had "acted recklessly" and released "misleadingly positive" market updates before it collapsed. As a result, the FCA said it had sent notices to some (unnamed) former Carillion directors warning of possible enforcement action (possible sanctions include public censure, fines and suspensions from holding certain positions). In January 2021, the Insolvency Service said it would seek to ban eight former Carillion directors, including Howson, from holding senior boardroom positions. In July 2022, the FCA announced it had decided to fine Howson £397,800; the former director appealed against the penalty, and in July 2025, it was announced the appeal would be heard in February 2026. Shortly before his appeal was due to be heard at London’s Upper Tribunal on 16 February 2026, Howson withdrew his FCA challenge and agreed a fine reduced to £237,700, reflecting his cooperation with the FCA and a recalculation of his earnings. The FCA said Howson "acted recklessly and was knowingly concerned in breaches by Carillion of the Market Abuse Regulation and the Listing Rules."

In October 2023, the Insolvency Service announced Howson had been disqualified from being a director of a UK company for eight years for his conduct as a director of Carillion.

=== Other directorships ===
Howson became a non-executive director of Wood Group in April 2016, but resigned on 17 January 2018, following the collapse of Carillion.

Banned from being a director of a UK company, Howson was appointed construction president of an American contractor - Tampa, Florida-based TECfusions - in January 2024. He was appointed to the role by the CEO, Simon Tusha, a convicted felon. In July 2025, he was reported to be still based in Tampa.

== Personal life ==
Howson and his wife Geri own a home in Skipton, North Yorkshire, and a six-bedroom chalet in the French alpine ski resort of Châtel. They have two sons.
