= Speedy Hire =

British tools and equipment company

Speedy Hire plc
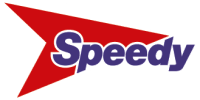
- Trade name: Speedy Hire
- Type: Public Limited Company
- Traded as: LSE: SDY
- Industry: Rental Equipment
- Founded: 1977
- Founder: John Brown
- Headquarters: Haydock, United Kingdom
- Key people: David Shearer (Non-executive Chairman); Dan Evans (Chief Executive Officer)
- Products: Tools; Lifting Equipment; Power Equipment; Rail Equipment
- Services: Powered Access; Services in Training; Testing; Inspection and Certification; Fuel Management; Event Management; Airport Services; Survey
- Revenue: ▼£416.1 million (2026)
- Operating income: ▼£4.3 million (2026)
- Net income: ▼£(26.6) million (2026)
- Website: speedyservices.com

Speedy Hire plc is a provider of tools and equipment hire, based in the United Kingdom, and also provides services to the construction, infrastructure, industrial markets.

== History ==
The company was founded in Wigan by John Brown as a division of Allen Group plc in 1977. It was first listed on the London Stock Exchange in October 1993.

The company established a branch to service the oil and gas markets in the United Arab Emirates in 2012, but sold the business to the Abu Dhabi National Oil Company in March 2021.

== Operations ==
The company operates nationally across the United Kingdom and Ireland from over two hundred fixed sites and, through a joint venture, in the oil and gas markets in Kazakhstan.
