= Corporate governance in the United Kingdom =

UK corporate governance is the regime through which companies in the United Kingdom are regulated.

There are two main corporate governance codes in the UK:

1. The Financial Reporting Council's UK Corporate Governance Code
2. The Quoted Companies Alliance's QCA Corporate Governance Code

Companies whose shares are traded on the London Stock Exchange's main market are obliged to apply the UK Corporate Governance Code, while companies listed on the London Stock Exchange's Alternative Investment Market (AIM) are able to choose which code they apply:

- 89% apply the QCA Corporate Governance Code
- 6% apply the UK Corporate Governance Code
- 5% apply a range of other codes, such as those of non-UK territories.

== International influence ==
Detailed analysis of several UK corporate governance reports between 1992 and 2003 revealed that the UK has been able to influence US corporate governance regulation, specifically the 2002 Sarbanes-Oxley Act. This in turn accelerated the development of regulations in the European Union. The following reports in particular:

- the Cadbury Report on "Financial Aspects of Corporate Governance" (December 1992),
- Rutteman Guidance (December 1994),
- Greenbury Report (July 1995),
- Hampel Report on "Corporate Governance" (June 1998),
- Turnbull Report on "Internal Control: Guidance for Directors on the Combined Code" (September 1999) and
- Higgs Report on the "Review of the role and effectiveness of non-executive directors" (January 2003)

revealed that the UK has been able to influence US corporate governance regulation (Sarbanes-Oxley Act 2002 [SOA] on "Corporate Responsibility", enacted by the Senate and House of Representatives of the United States of America).

In return, through SOA the US is influencing and accelerating the development of an EU wide governance regulation. "The [European] Commission has expressed serious concerns over the [US] measures put forward, in particular the unnecessary outreach effects of the SOA for EU companies and EU auditors." EU based corporations which have US parent companies or subsidiaries that are listed at the US stock exchange (regulated by the Securities Exchange Commission) need to comply with the Sarbanes-Oxley Act 2002. Therefore, the Commission has reconsidered EU priorities on initiatives on the enhancement of corporate governance, which was initiated by the Commission's 1996 Green Paper (COM 1996/321) on "The Role, Position and Liability of Statutory Auditor in the EU" and laid down in Council Directive 84/253/EC ("the 8th Directive").

Following financial reporting scandals in the 1990s and early 2000s, the requirement to implement standards for the EU capital market to enhance public trust in the audit function in the EU and the need to respond to SOA, the Commission prepared with the Winter report. In September 2003 the Commission published the Communication (2003/236/02) on “Reinforcing the statutory audit in the EU” and in parallel an Action Plan on "Modernising Company Law and Enhancing Corporate Governance in the European Union". The Directive (2006/43/EC) on "statutory audit of annual accounts and consolidated accounts, amending Council Directive 78/660/EEC and 83/349/EEC and repealing Council Directive 84/253/EEC" was adopted by the European Parliament on 28 September 2005.

A new modern regulatory audit framework became applicable to non-EU audit firms performing audit work in relation to companies listed on the EU capital markets. To achieve recognition of the EU regulatory approaches to the protection of investors and other stakeholders, the Commission had regulatory discussions in particular with the U.S. Securities and Exchange Commission but also with decision makers in US Congress and EU Finance Ministers.
