= UK Shareholders Association =

British organisation

- Abbreviation: UKSA
- Established: 1992; 34 years ago
- Type: Advocacy group
- Legal status: Not-for-profit organisation
- Purpose: Encourage improvement of the investment environment for individual shareholders
- Location: Washington, DC, United States
- Region served: United States
- Services: Regional meetings, a newsletter, advocate and respond to financial regulators
- Members: 500 (2023)
- Official language: English
- Chairman: Charles Henderson
- Funding: Membership fees, donations and membership services
- Website: www.uksa.org.uk

The UK Shareholders’ Association (UKSA) is a not-for-profit organisation limited by guarantee with over 500 members. It is the UK's oldest shareholder campaigning organisation, representing and supporting individual investors in the UK stock markets.

== History ==
UKSA was formed in 1992 and is funded from membership fees, donations and membership services. Founding members of UKSA were Nick Stevens, Donald Butcher and others meeting in a home via a letter in the Investors Chronicle.

== Membership ==
Membership of UKSA is open to anyone with an interest in stock market investment and in improving the investment environment for private investors. UKSA encourages improvement of the investment environment through critical but constructive engagement with the UK Government, the Regulators and the wider financial services industry. UKSA regularly responds to consultations from Government, the Financial Reporting Council and the Financial Conduct Authority.

UKSA also participates on working parties, particularly on issues such as UK corporate governance, including the Cadbury Report, the Greenbury Report and the Myners Report. More recently, UKSA has responded to the Department of Business, Energy, Innovation and Strategy’s independent enquiry into the Financial Reporting Council, chaired by Sir John Kingman, to the Competition and Market Authority's call for evidence on the condition of the statutory audit market, and to the Brydon Review.

== Affiliations ==
UKSA participates in European discussion through its membership of the European Federation of Investors and Financial Services Users (Better Finance), and provides a discussion forum through its newsletter, The Private Investor.

== Services ==
It also runs educational events and regional networking meetings. As a result, UKSA members actively encourage better accountability between boardrooms and investors through specially arranged meetings between FTSE companies and private investors. Battles have reached the national media, including British Gas, Railtrack and the successful defence of Marks & Spencer from Philip Green. Since the financial crash in 2007, UKSA has been campaigning for fair and equitable treatment of private investors in cases where audit and regulatory oversight appears to have failed. Examples include Lloyds TSB, Northern Rock and Bradford & Bingley, and, more recently, Carillon and Patisserie Valerie.
