= Alastair Ross Goobey =

Alastair Ross Goobey CBE (6 December 1945 – 2 February 2008) was a leading British investment manager and pension fund manager.

As CEO between 1993 and 2001 of Hermes Pensions Management, he played a leading role in developing institutional shareholder activism on the London Stock Exchange, instrumental in improving the culture of corporate governance in the City of London.

== Biography ==
Born in London, he was the son of George Ross Goobey, a distinguished pension fund manager of Imperial Tobacco, who is credited with first investing pension funds into company shares. Raised in Clevedon, Somerset, near Bristol, he was educated at Marlborough College and read economics at Trinity College, Cambridge, where he became an active member of both the musical society and Cambridge Footlights.

=== Career ===
Ross Goobey joined Kleinwort Benson on graduation in 1968, and became an investment manager at Hume Holdings in 1972. He took his first dedicated pensions post at Courtaulds in 1977.

A member of the Conservative Bow Group, he stood unsuccessfully in 1979 as a Conservative Party candidate in the Labour Party seat of Leicester West, losing but becoming friends with Nigel Lawson.

Ross Goobey returned to the city to become a director of Geoffrey Morley & Partners in 1981. He took a sabbatical in 1985, becoming a special adviser to Nigel Lawson in his position as the Chancellor of the Exchequer for two years from 1986. In 1987 he joined James Capel & Co. He returned to HM Treasury for the year in 1991 at the request of Norman Lamont in the run up to the 1992 United Kingdom general election.

He was appointed the CEO of PosTel in 1993; later renamed the BT Pension Scheme, it controlled the investments and returns of the pension funds of both the Royal Mail, the Post Office and British Telecom employees. After arguing that the fund needed to increase its client exposure, he was key in creating the independent but still 100% owned by BT organisation in Hermes Pensions Management, for which he served as CEO until 2002. He then became chairman of Hermes Focus Asset Management until his death in 2008, which focused on investment returns.

It was in these combined roles that he campaigned controversially for many elements that are now incorporated into the UK Combined Code, which governs management of public companies. His first target was directors' three-year contracts, ending the then accepted practice of giving FTSE CEOs rolling three-year contracts, which meant that on exit or failure huge contractual pay-offs were due irrespective of share-holder value added. Hermes wrote to all FTSE chairmen pressing for shorter contracts. In 1996 the Greenbury Report was suggesting the now standard 12 months, separation of the roles of chairman and chief executive, and greater disclosure. His ideas were adopted and developed by the Hampel Report on corporate governance in 1998 and the subsequent Higgs Report on directors' roles. The eventual 2003 UK Combined Code also brought in his championed recommendations of transparency, professionalism in appointments, accountability and openness. When asked how he squared these often controversial positions with his Conservative politics, he responded:

In the 1970s and 1980s, the issue was whether we were going to have capitalism, now the issue is how we can make it work properly.

Ross Goobey was an experienced non-executive director, serving on the boards of Wellcome Trust, a council member for Lloyd's of London, chairman of Invista Real Estate Investment Management (INRE) formerly listed on AIM, London Stock Exchange, and Senior independent director of Gcap Media, and served on the board of Scottish Life and Cheltenham & Gloucester. He was a senior advisor to the European Advisory Board of Morgan Stanley from 2002 to his death.

A Liveryman of the Gold and Silver Wyre Drawers Company, Ross Goobey was appointed CBE in 2000 for services to pensions.

=== Public service ===
Having served two terms with HM Treasury, Ross Goobey served on various UK Government panels, including: the Goode Committee on Pensions Law; the Middleton Committee on film industry finance; chairman of the Private Finance Panel from 1996–97 (from which refusing to resign, he was sacked by New Labour chancellor Gordon Brown); chairman of the International Corporate Governance Network from 2002 to 2005.

He was a trustee of CancerBACUP, on the investment committees of the National Gallery and the Royal Opera, and an adviser to the Royal Opera House pension fund, and a director of the Almeida Theatre. He was a governor of the Royal Academy of Music, from which he received an honorary fellowship.

=== Writing ===
Having written private client briefs from the start of his career, his thoughts came to public attention when at James Capel he wrote the weekly column, "From Your Side of the Desk". In his later career, he became a regular columnist in Estates Gazette. He was a panellist on seven series of BBC Radio 4's business quiz The Board Game.

He wrote The Money Moguls (1987) and Bricks and Mortals (1992), an account of the UK 1980s property boom and bust. At the time of his death, he had an unpublished novel set against the backdrop of France's equivalent of the South Sea Bubble, in John Law's Mississippi scandal.

=== Personal life ===
He married Sarah Stille in 1969, whom he had met through the university theatrical society; the couple had a son and a daughter. The family lived in London, and had a house in the South of France.

He was a well known and active supporter of Bristol City F.C., and an active club cricketer who was a member of the MCC. He played the piano and the clarinet, on which he soloed at Clive James's wedding.

Diagnosed with myeloma blood cancer in 1998, he died at his home in London.
