= Shareholder committee =

Committee formed to assess public company directors

A shareholder nomination to the AGM committee (SNAC, sometimes called a 'Shareholder Committee') is a voluntary committee formed with the Chairman of the Board to assess the current Directors and discuss potential future Directors. A shareholder committee typically holds two or three short meetings a year.

A Shareholder committee is created in two ways 1) when a vote to do so passes at a general shareholders meeting in response to a resolution to hold such a vote. The vote is advisory however ‘it would be a pretty ballsy board to reject it’ said ICGN Chairmans answer from the 2010 ICGN Conference in London. or 2) By accepting an invitation to meet with the Chairman of the Board who is also in charge of the Board of Directors Nomination Committee which also proposes and nominates new Directors to be appointed to the Board.

The SNAC committee of five members is formed with the following principles. The Chairman of the Board as convenor, a private investor, as well as three large beneficial shareholders also wish to appoint a representative. The invitations to join are sent to those with the largest beneficial shareholding in the PLC. (intended to allow time before the AGM, with, a one full voting member from a recognised private investor shareholder organisation representative.(In 2020 the UK's ShareSoc or UKSA in Sweden Aktiespararna). The SNAC Committee has the right, at the expense of the company, to engage a headhunter or other external consultants which the SNAC Committee deems necessary to fulfil its assignment. The Shareholder Nomination to the AGM Committee (SNAC) remains until a new SNAC committee is constituted. The committee can coopt non voting members to attend.

== History ==
In 1993 the Shareholders Nomination to the AGM Committee (SNAC) were started by the Swedish Private Shareholders Organization, Aktiespararna, in response to the 1992 Cadbury Report into corporate governance. The Private shareholders thought it would be good idea to invite the Chairman to meet with them and other large shareholders to discuss the existing and future management and selection of the Board of Directors.

Initially many of the largest shareholders refused preferring their private meetings, allowing many keen 'overweight' smaller institutional investors to join. Embarrassing Swedish press coverage of big pension funds refusing to attend these short one-hour meetings with the Non Executive Chairman of the Board resulted in big investment funds organising themselves to join biannually. Shareholder Committees are held throughout Sweden and in the Nordic country's whilst the UK has in 2017–18 a successful voluntary one at Marks And Spencer PLC.

The UK Shareholders Association, UKSA, picked up the idea in the early days of their formation in 1993 before the idea was then overwhelmed by the push back on 1p share options. Renamed "Shareholder Committee” the idea faces some opposition from the existing CEOs and Chairman however the promotion by merit was liked by talented Directors.

Cevian Capital senior partner Harlan Zimmerman and Mark Goyder of Tomorrow's Company collaborated to produce a report that reintroduced the idea to the UK at a 2010 ICGN Corporate Governance Conference.

As an AGM resolution it requires no changes in the company's articles of association and a standard resolution format was adopted in Sweden that sets out the voluntary selection processes and operations. Sensible rules like only allowing a shareholder to chair the meeting, requiring the Chairman of the Board to invite the shareholders to join, setting out when a member can formally leave the committee (if they no longer have any shares held in that company), only accepting beneficial owner shareholders that volunteers to join and proposing an annual re election at the AGM of members so there is a full shareholders mandate and approval of the individual elected members.

Typically the largest institutional owners or their fund manager representatives operate a one-year on one year off policy to allow the manager freedom to trade or adjust their portfolio of shares. Swedish Pension Fund Trustees reported a significant 0.5% improvement in the performance of Fund managers who attended SNAC meetings. Citation needed.

2011 A founding director Gavin Palmer of ShareSoc reinvigorated the old idea and the Board of ShareSoc produced a policy paper supporting the proposal.

DTI Minister Vince Cable participated in a consultation and caused the formation of something similar The Investors Forum which had great success with Balfour Beatty PLC and several other engagements. However, that proposal lacked a seat for the private investor organization as in Sweden. The Investors Forum created a report found that there was a demand from Chairman in normally performing PLC that felt that they had been overlooked by large investors. A regular consultation with the Chairman helps in deciding the direction of the company for instance re Brexit.

In 2012 a shareholder proposal was made to have the Board of RBS to propose the establishment of a Shareholder Committee which was refused by both the Board and the Board's Nomination committee.

2013 Corporate Governance Conference was held in Parliament and Gavin FL Palmer won the Best Paper competition for the Best Conference Paper with a proposal for establishing Shareholder Nomination to the AGM Committees and to further include the attendance of the largest creditor/commercial bank to the PLC which was deemed ‘an elegant solution’ for RBS Group PLC by a senior prominent MP.

In 2016 Chris Philp MP included Shareholder Committees in a proposal to the UK Parliament "Restoring Responsible Ownership"

In 2017–18 growing calls from ShareSoc and Manifest director Cliff Weight with founding member Gavin Palmer were made to the Royal Bank of Scotland (RBS). Shareholder requisitions for a resolution were made before year ends in 2016 and 2017. Despite the 163 signatories in 2016, RBS refused to put the resolution forward to the 2017 Annual General Meeting citing unspecified legal reasons. Risking a re run of the entire AGM.

In 2018 The RBS Board accepted the resolutions and text for the 30th May 2018 AGM with an AGM debate – a UK first. Special Resolution 27. To direct the Board to establish a Shareholder Committee. RBS has 190,000 shareholders with UK Government Investments (UKGI) formerly called UK Financial Investments (UKFI) owning 73%. Since reduced by selling after the Agm. The Shareholders resolution was comprehensively defeated with the UKGIs vote although a review of the Agm video shows that the attending shareholders had no idea of what resolution was being put to the vote during the meeting. The Chairman also closed the meeting despite a private shareholders point of order to remove the Chairman from Chairing the AGM. The vote in favour of Resolution 27 if excluding the Governments UKGIs 60%+ shareholding was very significant at 6%.

2018 February 7 Transparency Task Force House of Commons 2019 The RBS Board agreed to hosting 4 private investor events across the country which are as large as AGMs 90 private investors in return for ShareSoc not putting forward another resolution requesting a shareholders Nomination to the AGM committee be formed.

2019 The Labour Party adapted this Shareholder Nomination to the AGM Committee idea to make an Employee Ownership fund that when owning 5% could thereby in its own right propose resolutions to EGMs and AGMs and elections to the Board.

== Operation ==
Shareholders submit the resolution dealing primarily with corporate governance as a way to fairly and formally organise fellow beneficial shareholders to discuss the selection of Directors. The Chairman of the Board acts as a voter, guide and member. New volunteer Shareholder representatives are elected annually by all shareholders after being invited by the Chairman of the Board to join according to the size of their beneficial shareholding. Acceptance is voluntary and if refused the next largest beneficial shareholder is asked until the SNAC committee is filled. SNAC membership has been shown to improve a Pension Fund managers performance by 0.5% per year, allows rapid simple adjustment to incapacitated CEOs, a considerable improvement despite voluntarily stopping trading the shares for a year whilst elected in case of hearing an impending top three board member change that is considered price sensitive. An independent analyst attributed this to the Fund Manager understanding the talent and plans of the management better just like Warren Buffett goes taking a shareholding then increasing that holding as the management undo structural or store reorganisation picking up shares on the cheap.

Virtually all shareholder resolutions are non-binding (or "precatory," to use the legal term of art). In this sense the voting on these resolutions more closely resembles a poll than it does a (binding) referendum or plebiscite. Still, media coverage of voting on shareholder resolutions tends to focus on whether the proposal received a majority of votes.

== Legal status ==
To summarise the SNAC committee resolution is advisory like most AGM resolutions. The SNAC committee is only able to put forward a resolution to be put at the AGM if its 5 member members have over 100 shareholder members or 5% of the Shares. Then that agreed resolution with text is put forward for all shareholders to decide upon which is the norm for all limited companies owned by shareholders. The text could be for the termination or appointment of a Director etc. which has always been the case since the formation of joint stock companies (VOC).

The only difference is that the SNAC committee can use company money to gain a short list of suitable candidates for replacing Directors. However any good Chairman of the Board will already have those to hand in case a Director gets run over by a bus, heart attack etc. for every role so would not be needed unless it is to replace the Chairman. The Swedish resolutions include wording to enable the SNAC committee to undertake its job with confidentiality and to guard against gaining price sensitive information e.g. changing the CEO or Chairman or Finance Director. The custom and practice solution is for the nominated committee member representing the beneficial shareholder that they and the shareholder do not trade the company's shares for the year whilst attending the SNAC meeting. The Nomination Committee of the Board remains with all its powers and which is why the Shareholder Nomination to the AGM Committee has such a long and different title.

Shareholder resolutions have been an important part of activist campaigns in several cases. For example, resolutions were effective at raising public awareness and thereby pressuring corporate management about investments in Shell Transport and Trading PLC about Green issues by the organisation Follow This and since 2019 called Climate Change resolutions including to ExxonMobil, Equinor, BP, Chevron, apartheid South Africa, nuclear power, and labor disputes. Given these results, resolutions have been spearheaded by several coordinating groups, including the AFL–CIO and the Interfaith Center on Corporate Responsibility. Governmental, Local Authorities, Trade unions pension funds also have become involved in supporting and submitting shareholder resolutions.

== Sources ==
- Swedish Shareholders Association Est 1966 Aktiespararna
- ShareSoc.org. Est 2011 "Shareholder Committees Proposal"
- UK Shareholder Association UKSA Est 1992
- High Pay Centre and Chris Philps MP 'Restoring Responsible Ownership' Sep 2016
- Shareholder Committee called for at RBS say Manifest Dec 2017
- RBS Shareholders call for a Shareholders Committee Independent newspaper Dec 2017
- Investor groups win vote on RBS shareholder committee - Reuters UK, 2018
- RBS agrees to shareholder group's demand for shareholder ...- Scottish Financial News, 2018
- Letter to shareholders - RBS: Investor relations, 2018
- Follow This Climate Change group 2019 and 5 Oil major resolutions
- 2020 Transparency Task Force Ambassador Gavin FL Palmer

== Reading ==
- AFL-CIO. "How to File a Shareholder Resolution"
- Shareholder Activism [IRRC]
- Voorhes, Meg. "The Rising Tide of Shareholder Activism" DC: [IRRC], 2005
