= Myners Report =

Institutional Investment in the UK: A Review (the Myners Report) was a report to HM Treasury in March 2001 on institutional investors. It was delivered by Paul Myners.

Government was concerned that institutional investors were giving insufficient attention and resources to their holdings in non-listed companies. The report addressed this, in particular concerning pension fund trustees and fund managers.

Though some anticipated creation of public interest duties, the Report took the approach of asking whether institutional investors were acting in the best interests of their beneficiaries.

== Summary ==
The report questions whether institutional investors in the UK are too risk averse and considers if there are any factors distorting the decision-making by institutional investors. Back in 2001 UK pension funds were only investing 0.5% of their portfolio into venture capital, whereas the US equivalents invested 5%.

== See also ==
- Combined Code
- Cadbury Report (1992)
- Greenbury Report (1995)
- Hampel Report (1998)
- Turnbull Report
- Higgs Report (2003)
