= Comply or explain =

Comply or explain is a regulatory approach used in the United Kingdom, Germany, the Netherlands and other countries in the field of corporate governance and financial supervision. Rather than setting out binding laws, government regulators (in the UK, the Financial Reporting Council (FRC), in Germany, under the Aktiengesetz) set out a code that listed companies may either comply with or publicly explain why they do not.

The purpose of "comply or explain" is to "let the market decide" whether a set of standards is appropriate for individual companies. Since a company may deviate from the standard, this approach rejects the view that "one size fits all", but because of the requirement of disclosure of explanations to market investors, anticipates that if investors do not accept a company's explanations, then they will sell their shares, hence creating a "market sanction", rather than a legal one. The concept was first introduced after the recommendations of the Cadbury Report of 1992.

== Usage ==
The UK Corporate Governance Code, the German Corporate Governance Code (or Deutscher Corporate Governance Kodex) and the Dutch Corporate Governance Code 'Code Tabaksblat' (nl:code-Tabaksblat) use this approach in setting minimum standards for companies in their audit committees, remuneration committees and recommendations for how good companies should divide authority on their boards. Swedish company law requirements expect companies to identify any code rules which they have not complied with, explain why they have not complied, and describe their alternative solution.

Under the revised Shareholder Rights Directive of 2017 (SRD II), companies must develop and publish a policy stating how voting rights operate and how shareholders are engaged in the running of the company, subject to the "comply or explain" principle.

== Benefits and drawbacks ==
The approach has both benefits and drawbacks.

=== Benefits ===
The main benefits are that the approach offers flexibility to corporations, lowers their compliance burden, and stimulates discussion about changes in legislation.(Ho 2017; Galle 2014; Abma and Olaerts 2012; Lu 2021)

=== Drawbacks ===
The main drawbacks are that material compliance is difficult to enforce, that the approach can encourage ‘tick-the-box’ compliance and, most prominently, that corporations may give perfunctory explanations for non-compliance.(Ho 2012; Galle 2014; Abma and Olaerts 2012) The lack of meaningful explanations is seen as the biggest drawback.

Many studies point to the low quality of explanations given in comply or explain mechanisms in corporate governance and non-financial reporting regulations (MacNeil and Li 2006; Cuomo et al 2016; FRC 2021). In the UK (MacNeil and Li 2006; Shrives and Brennan 2015), Germany (Talaulicar and Werder 2008), Greece (Nerantzidis 2015), Italy (Lepore et al. 2018) and the Netherlands (Hooghiemstra 2012; Monitoring Commissie Corporate Governance Code 2020) studies find that explanations for non-compliance with corporate governance codes are often inadequate. Similar results are found when studying non-compliance explanations in the realm of European non-financial reporting (Björklund 2021; Monciardini et al. 2020; Szabó and Sørensen 2015; Boiral 2013). This collection of research indicates that possible high levels of ‘compliance’ with corporate governance codes and non-financial reporting requirements are in fact much lower due to the large percentage of inadequate explanations.

== Enforcement and supervision ==
Due to the drawbacks to the comply or explain approach, several studies have proposed that an increased level of (public) enforcement and supervision is necessary in order to monitor inadequate explanations of non-compliance. (Lu 2021; Hooghiemstra 2012; Keay 2014; Seidl et al. 2013; Boiral 2013). Since the explanation for non-compliance is the cornerstone of the comply or explain approach, authors are specifically calling on public enforcement authorities to take a more active role. (Lu 2021; Hooghiemstra 2012;) Some researchers have identified corporate characteristics associated with differences in the quality of non-compliance explanations.(2.4). Studies conducted in Germany, Italy and the Netherlands have examined the characteristics associated with higher-quality non-compliance explanations (Talaulicar and Werder 2008); Hooghiemstra 2012;; Lepore et al. 2018). These findings may be useful to stakeholders monitoring compliance and to public authorities responsible for supervision.

The FRC has published guidance on "what constitutes an explanation" as a means of comparing the approach of those who prepare businesses' explanations with the expectations of those to whom they are addressed.

== See also ==
- UK company law
- German company law
