= Ronald Hampel =

English industrialist (1932–2026)

Sir Ronald Claus Hampel (31 May 1932 – 26 February 2026) was an English businessman, who was chief executive and chairman of ICI in the 1990s. He planned and oversaw the Zeneca de-merger in June 1993.

== Early life and education ==
Hampel was born in Shropshire on 31 May 1932, the son of Karl Hampel (1898–1960) and Rutgard Hauck (1904–1975). His brothers were born in 1934 and 1935. He grew up in Allscott.

He attended Corpus Christi College, Cambridge where he obtained an MA in Modern Languages and Law.

== Career ==
Hampel started at ICI in 1955. He joined the ICI board in 1985.

In the 1990s, ICI was the world's largest manufacturer of paint (after buying Glidden Paints in 1986) and explosives (after buying Atlas Powder Company in 1990).

In February 1991, it had been decided to streamline the company around seven core business areas. Later in 1991, it was realised that there was most synergy around two distinct main core areas. He became chief operating officer on Tuesday 1 October 1991.

On 29 July 1992, it was officially decided to de-merge the business into ICI and another company, possibly to be known as ICI Biosciences. In late November 1992, it had been decided to call the new company Zeneca, under David Barnes (1936–2020). The company was originally to be called Zenica. The main products of Zeneca included Hibitane (Chlorhexidine), the world's best-selling hospital antiseptic since the 1950s. DNA fingerprinting and DNA paternity testing had been mostly first developed by Cellmark Diagnostics (now called Orchid Cellmark), which became part of Zeneca; to this day it is one of the main UK DNA profiling companies; it was the world's first commercial DNA testing laboratory. For 1991, Zeneca had larger sales than Pfizer.

He became chief executive and deputy-chairman of ICI in 1993. The reformed £2.5 billion ICI would largely make paint and explosives. Zeneca would be worth £6 billion. Zeneca split in June 1993.

Hampel was appointed chairman in April 1995. In 1996, he was paid £863,000. In 1997, ICI bought Unilever's chemical division for £4.8 billion. He was chairman until Thursday 22 April 1999, at the annual shareholders meeting, with Friends of the Earth in uninvited attendance.

== Corporate governance ==
In January 1998, Hampel was responsible for the Hampel Report, for corporate governance in the United Kingdom, set up by the Financial Reporting Council in November 1995.

== Personal life and death ==
Hampel was knighted in the 1995 New Year Honours.

In 1957, he married in Somerset. Hampel had twin sons (born 1962), another son (born 1960) and one daughter (born 1958). He lived in rural West Sussex.

Hampel died at home on 26 February 2026, at the age of 93.
