= Goobey =

Goobey is a surname. Notable people with the surname include:

- Alastair Ross Goobey (1945–2008), British investment manager and pension fund manager
- George Ross Goobey (1911–1999), British fund manager, father of Alastair

== See also ==
- Gooby
