= Asil Nadir =

British-Turkish-Cypriot businessman (1941–2025)

- Born: Asilkan Nadir; 1 May 1941; Lefka, British Cyprus
- Died: 9 February 2025 (aged 83); North Nicosia, Northern Cyprus
- Education: Istanbul University
- Occupation: Businessman
- Years active: 1980–2016
- Title: CEO of Polly Peck
- Term: 1980–90
- Successor: Company bankrupt and broken up
- Criminal charges: False accounting and theft (13 specimen charges)
- Criminal penalty: 10 years (served 1 day in Turkey)
- Criminal status: Released by Republic of Turkey (after 1 day in jail)
- Spouses: Ayşegül Tecimer (m. 1962; div. 1989) Nur Nadir (m. 2005)
- Children: 6

Asilkan Nadir (1 May 1941 – 9 February 2025) was a British Turkish Cypriot businessman. He was the chief executive of Polly Peck, which he took over as a small textile company. During the 1980s, he expanded it into one of the United Kingdom's top 100 FTSE-listed companies, with interests in consumer electronics, fruit distribution, and packaging.

In 1990, Polly Peck collapsed following an investigation by the Serious Fraud Office and charges were brought against Asil Nadir on 70 counts of false accounting and theft, which he denied. From 1993 until 2010, Nadir lived in northern Cyprus, having fled there to escape a trial in the UK. He remained a fugitive from British justice until 26 August 2010, when he returned to London to face judicial examination. His trial commenced at the Old Bailey on 3 September 2010, on 13 specimen charges of false accounting and theft totalling £34 million. He was found guilty of 10 counts of theft totalling £29 million and on 23 August 2012 was sentenced to 10 years in prison. In 2016, Nadir was transferred to serve the rest of his sentence in Turkey, but was released one day later.

== Early life ==
Nadir was born in 1941 in Lefka, Cyprus. His father, Irfan Nadir, was a local businessman and police constable in the colonial police department. When he was six years old, he began selling newspapers, and he moved with his family to London in the 1950s when his father expanded the family clothing business from a base in the East End of London.

== Career ==
Nadir studied economics at Istanbul University, but returned to Cyprus before graduation to set up a clothing business. He returned to London in the 1960s, but after the Turkish invasion of Cyprus in 1974, accepted the appeal of the de facto authorities to bolster the new region economically. The Turkish occupation enabled him to take over a Greek-Cypriot owned clothing factory in Nicosia, where he greatly expanded exports to the Middle East.

=== Polly Peck ===
In the late 1970s he purchased a small British textile company, Polly Peck, which he turned into a portfolio company with which to make various corporate raiding purchases in clothing, fruit packing and later consumer electronics. Through this he came to prominence in the 1980s as a tycoon and the CEO of an organisation by then with over 24,000 shareholders and interests ranging from produce to electronics. Within a decade, Nadir had built Peck from almost nothing into a member of the FTSE 100.

His criminal mismanagement led to its collapse in 1990.

== Escape to northern Cyprus ==
Nadir faced 66 charges of theft and fraud, but failed to appear at his trial in 1993 after fleeing to the unrecognised Turkish Republic of Northern Cyprus, which has no extradition treaty with the United Kingdom, where he resided until 2010. Although a UK arrest warrant was subsequently issued for his breach of bail, it was not valid due to procedural reasons. In a 2003 interview with the BBC, Nadir vowed to return to the UK to attempt to clear his name. However, he said that he was fearful of the consequences to his health and refused to go back until the British government agreed to give him bail and not remand him in prison until his trial. On 26 August 2010, having provided bail of £250,000 and secured an agreement to not be remanded in prison until his trial, he returned to the UK.

Peter Dimond, the pilot who flew Nadir out of the UK from Compton Abbas Airfield in a twin-engined private plane, was jailed for two years in August 1998 for committing an act intended to pervert the course of justice, but he was freed by the Court of Appeal in January 1999 when it quashed the conviction after it was discovered that Nadir was not on bail at the time of his escape as his bail had lapsed. For the same reason, Ramadan Güney, who had stood guarantor for £1m of the £3.5m bail surety, was not required to pay over the funds.

== Later career ==
Nadir ran a business in northern Cyprus called the Kıbrıs Media Group, which inter alia publishes the newspaper Kıbrıs (Turkish for 'Cyprus') and the English language weekly Cyprus Today. It also owns a radio and TV station. Nadir's outlets published articles critical of the Republican Turkish Party/Reform Party coalition government in the run-up to the April 2009 general election and actively supported the then opposition National Unity Party and Democratic Party. On 12 March 2009 Kıbrıs Media Group was suddenly presented with a tax demand in the amount of 11 million Turkish lira ($6.3 million) payable the following day, on pain of the sequestration of its assets. Leading opposition politicians branded this action as an attempt to gag the free media. The edition of 14 March 2009 of Cyprus Today appeared as usual.

Ministers subsequently awarded him a multimillion-euro contract to operate Lefkoniko Airport in northern Cyprus.

== Return to UK ==
On 30 July 2010 it was reported that a British judge had granted Nadir bail, which it was said would pave the way for him to return to the UK to face trial.

On 26 August 2010, Nadir returned to the UK with his wife Nur in a private Boeing 737 aircraft, leased from Onur Air, to face trial. His bail conditions included the £250,000 bail surety already paid to the court, surrendering his passport, wearing an electronic tag, reporting to a police station once a week, and being prohibited from going near any airport. He appeared at the Old Bailey on 3 September 2010 to comply with bail conditions. Nadir stayed in a £20,000-a-month rented house. Owing to the complexity of the allegations, his trial did not begin until 23 January 2012.

On 22 August 2012, Asil Nadir was found guilty of ten counts of theft of nearly £29 million from Polly Peck. The jury found him not guilty on three counts. The jury had been advised at the start of the trial that the 13 were specimen charges and the overall amount allegedly stolen was about £146 million. He was sentenced to ten years' imprisonment.

== Transfer to Turkey ==
In April 2016, Asil Nadir was transferred to a Turkish prison. A Ministry of Justice spokesman said: "It is right that foreign criminals are properly punished but not at the expense of British taxpayers. This government is committed to removing foreign criminals to their own countries. Since Asil Nadir has now repaid the £2 million he owed the Legal Aid Agency, plus £5 million in compensation he paid earlier, arrangements were made with the Turkish government for his removal as part of the Prisoner Transfer Agreement."

Once back in Turkey, Nadir was held for only one day in prison before being released.

== Personal life and death ==
Nadir was born to a Turkish Cypriot family. He was the father of five children, one by his mistress when aged 19, two by his first wife, one by a former mistress, and one by his second wife, Nur. Nadir was listed at 36th on the Sunday Times Rich List in 1990.

Nadir died in a hospital in North Nicosia on 6 February 2025, at the age of 83.
