= Bark&co Solicitors =

Boutique law firm based in the City of London, United Kingdom

Bark&co
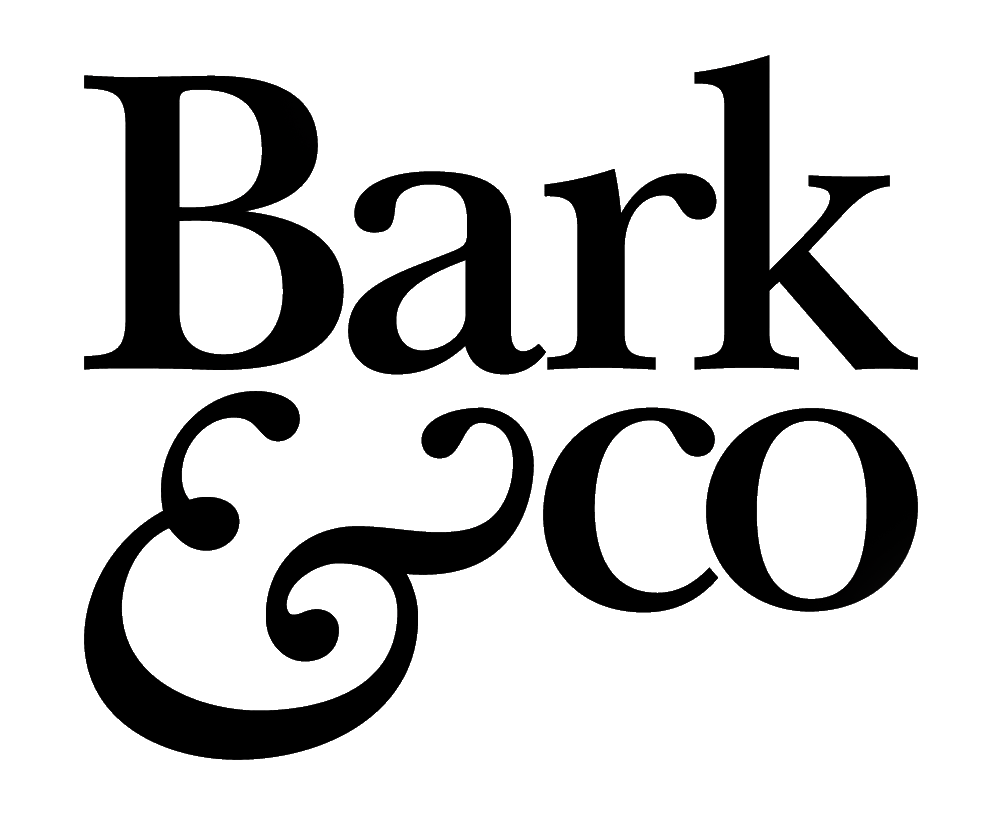
- No. of lawyers: Approx. 50
- Major practice areas: White collar crime Fraud; Corporate Crime & Investigations; Tax; Fraud Civil; General Crime
- Key people: Giles Bark-Jones (Principle); Khalil Makonnen (Tax & Civil Litigation Manager)
- Date founded: 1996
- Website: barkco.com

Bark&co is a boutique law firm headquartered in the City of London, United Kingdom. Since its inception in 1996, it has been a member of the Specialist Fraud Panel and has grown into a top-tier firm in multiple fields. It has represented defendants in several high-profile cases including the largest ever alleged insider dealing case, the Polly Peck International (formerly a constituent of the FTSE100) thefts, and Ian Edmondson in the News International phone hacking scandal.

== Notable cases ==
=== Libor Scandal ===
Bark&co represented one of six defendants, Noel Cryan, in the Libor scandal. In January 2016, all six defendants were cleared of all charges after a two-year battle and the case banded a "shambles."

=== News International phone hacking scandal ===
Bark&co was instructed by Ian Edmondson, former News of The World Editor, in the News International phone hacking scandal.

=== Murder of Daniel Morgan ===
Bark & Co represented Glenn Vian, who over the course of nearly twenty years has repeatedly been accused of the highly publicised murder of a private investigator in 1987. Mr Vian was eventually charged with this offence in 2008, and held on remand for over two years. The case against Mr Vian was constructed around a number of "supergrass" witnesses" who the defence were, following painstaking work, able to discredit, one by one, until the case ultimately collapsed. During the course of the case preparation, the defence were able to demonstrate over fifty other suspects and motives which the police, over the course of no less than five investigations, failed to investigate either properly or, in multiple cases, at all.

=== Murder of Melanie Hall ===
Bark&co was instructed to represent an alleged suspect in the Murder of Melanie Hall following his arrest in November 2013. Two years later in November 2015, without charge, detectives asked the Crown Prosecution Service for a decision on charging.

== Awards and recognitions ==
=== ACQ White Collar Crime Firm of the Year ===
In 2013 Bark&co were awarded White Collar Crime Firm of the Year by ACQ.

=== Legal500 Top Tier Firm ===
Bark&co have been categorised as a Tier 4 firm in White Collar Crime by the Legal500.

=== Chambers and Partners ===
Ranked in Band 3 for being a "Solid player in the London market for sophisticated white-collar crime matters including money laundering and civil recovery proceedings."
