= Smith Report =

The Smith Report was a report on corporate governance submitted to the UK government in 2003. It was concerned with the independence of auditors in the wake of the collapse of Arthur Andersen and the Enron scandal in the US in 2002. Its recommendations now form part of the Combined Code on corporate governance, applicable through the Listing Rules for the London Stock Exchange.

It was substantially influenced by the views taken by the EU Commission. One important point was that an auditor himself should look at whether a company's corporate governance structure provides safeguards to preserve his own independence.

== See also ==
- Combined Code
- Cadbury Report (1992)
- Greenbury Report (1995)
- Hampel Report (1998)
- Turnbull Report
- Higgs Report (2003)
