= UKLA =

UKLA may stand for:

- United Kingdom Literacy Association
- UK Listing Authority, whose function has been subsumed by the Financial Services Authority
