= Audit, Reporting and Governance Authority =

The Audit, Reporting and Governance Authority is a proposed Audit regulator intended to be established in the United Kingdom to replace the Financial Reporting Council. The government announced plans for a new regulator in March 2019, and published detailed proposals in March 2021; the new regulator was expected to be fully implemented in 2023 but is delayed without a clear timetable.

== Background ==
=== Kingman Review ===
Following accounting irregularities at companies such as Carillion, Patisserie Valerie and BHS, the UK government ordered a review of the current supervisory environment by the Financial Reporting Council (FRC). The review was led by Legal & General chairman Sir John Kingman.

The review recommended the urgent introduction of a new regulator, the Audit, Reporting and Governance Authority, which should be accountable to Parliament, with the intention to provide more effective oversight and address a concentration in the industry - the Big Four audit firms' market share with FTSE350 firms being 98% at the time of the report.

In March 2019 Business Secretary Greg Clark announced he would implement the recommendation from the Kingman Review in 2019.

=== Legislation ===
Plans for the new regulator were included in the September 2019 Queen's Speech and, despite concerns that the launch of ARGA might be delayed, the Department for Business, Energy and Industrial Strategy (BEIS) told Accountancy Daily in February 2020 that "next steps on audit reform" would be taken in the first quarter of 2020. However, further details were slow to emerge; in November 2020 City A.M. reported that reform proposals relating to the audit sector were expected in early 2021 with full implementation expected in 2023.

A UK Government policy paper, Restoring trust in audit and corporate governance, was published on 19 March 2021, consulting on its proposed steps to establish the ARGA and give it the formal duties, functions and powers it needs to be fully effective. In September 2021, the FRC's head of regulatory standards, Mark Babington said the ARGA would "commence in April 2023".

== Leadership ==
In July 2019, Clark announced that Simon Dingemans, formerly CFO at GlaxoSmithKline, had been appointed as the new chair of the Financial Reporting Council, and would lead its transition into the Audit, Reporting and Governance Authority. However, he left the role in May 2020, citing conflicts between the part-time role and other positions he was interested in taking. In December 2021, Jan du Plessis was nominated by the UK Government to lead the FRC through its transformation into the ARGA. In February 2022, du Plessis was confirmed as the FRC's new chair.

== Delay ==
No further announcements have been made as to the timetable for establishing ARGA, despite continued concerns about lack of competition in the UK audit market.
