= Stewardship Code =

The Stewardship Code is a part of UK company law concerning principles that institutional investors are expected to follow. It was first released in 2010 by the Financial Reporting Council ('FRC'), and in 2019 the FRC released an updated edition of the Stewardship Code.

The UK Stewardship Code (“Code”) is a voluntary code for asset managers (investment managers), asset owners, and service providers (such as proxy advisers, investment consultants, and data providers). Its stated aim is to encourage active and engaged monitoring of corporate governance for the interests of beneficiaries. Specifically, the Code aims to promote the responsible allocation, management, and oversight of capital to create long-term value for clients and beneficiaries leading to sustainable benefits for the economy, the environment, and society. In late 2019, the FRC substantially updated the original 2010 Code introducing new principles for different signatory groups as well as introducing new thematic issues centered on environmental, social, and governance (ESG) factors. The FRC also introduced a new reporting process.

== Preface ==
The Code sets stewardship standards for asset owners and fund managers (asset managers), and for service providers that support them.

The Code comprises a set of ‘apply and explain’ Principles for asset managers and asset owners, and a separate set of Principles for service providers (FRC Stewardship Code) The information is also sent to the Financial Reporting Council, which links to the information provided to it. From March 2021, organisations applying to become signatories to the Code are required to submit an annual stewardship report to the FRC which details how signatories have applied the Code over a 12-month period detailing both their stewardship activities and the resulting outcomes. Unlike the previous edition, the new Code covers all types of investments, not just equities.

The compulsion to, at the very least, explain non-compliance with the Code follows from the Financial Services and Markets Act 2000 section 2(4) and the Listing Rules.

== 2020 Principles ==
The updated Principles for Asset Owners and Managers are:

1. Purpose, strategy and culture
2. Governance, resources and incentives
3. Conflicts of interest
4. Promoting well-functioning markets
5. Review and assurance
6. Client and beneficiary needs
7. Stewardship, investment and ESG integration
8. Monitoring managers and service providers
9. Engagement
10. Collaboration
11. Escalation
12. Exercising rights and responsibilities

The new Principles for Service Providers are:

1. Purpose, strategy and culture
2. Governance, resources and incentives
3. Conflicts of interest
4. Promoting well-functioning markets
5. Supporting client’s stewardship
6. Review and assurance

== See also ==
- UK company law
- UK Corporate Governance Code
- Say on pay
- Dodd-Frank Wall Street Reform and Consumer Protection Act of 2010
