= List of honorary fellows of Corpus Christi College, Cambridge =

This is a list of Honorary Fellows of Corpus Christi College, Cambridge.

- Sir Richard Armstrong
- Sir Horace Avory
- Sir James Burnell-Nugent
- Elizabeth Butler-Sloss, Baroness Butler-Sloss
- Avinash Dixit
- Sir Mark Elder
- Terence Etherton, Baron Etherton
- Sir Ronald Hampel
- Richard Henderson
- Patrick Hodge, Lord Hodge
- Sir Andy Hopper
- Stuart Laing
- Sir Frederick Lawton
- Sir David Omand
- Sir Hugh Roberts
- Karol Sikora
- Sir Murray Stuart-Smith
- Sir Alan Wilson
- Dame Jacqueline Wilson
