= Hundred Group =

The Hundred Group, also referred to as "The 100 Group", represents the views of the Finance Directors of FTSE 100 and several large UK private companies.

In 2018, their member companies represented around 90% of the market capitalisation of the FTSE 100, collectively employing 6% of the UK workforce and in 2018, paid or generated, taxes equivalent to 12.6% of total UK Government receipts.

== Objectives of the Hundred Group ==
The main purpose of The Hundred Group is to provide a forum for discussion and to make contributions and representations on issues of importance for financial management. Members are actively involved to ensure that the views of users and preparers of accounts are fully understood. Submissions are made to Government and other organisations highlighting the practical implications of existing financial procedures, related legislation and proposed changes.

The Hundred Group is made up of a Main committee and four sub-committees covering the topics of Financial Reporting, Investor Relations & Markets, Tax and Pensions.

== History of The Hundred Group ==
The group began life as a spin-off from the London Society of Chartered Accountants, predating the launch of the FTSE-100. Originally called the Hundred Group of Chartered Accountants, its most immediate concern was the Labour government's price control policy at a time when inflation was 2% per month. The Hundred Group soon found its feet as a forum for discussion and lobbying.

Eventually, membership was widened to include FDs who were not chartered accountants and the affiliation with the London Society of Chartered Accountants was ended. The group became the Hundred Group of Finance Directors, and non-FDs were asked to leave.

The Hundred Group is now active at engaging with government, regulators and wider stakeholders and publish all responses to consultations on their website. Most recent responses have included to the CMA on the statutory audit market review and responses to the FRC on the revisions to the Corporate Governance Code.

== Membership of the Hundred Group ==
Participation in the group is by invitation only. In 2017, there were 85 members in the Group, including representatives from multinationals and other companies in industries that are not part of the FTSE-100.

== Past chairmen ==
- Jon Symonds, AstraZeneca, 2003; set up a tax research centre at Oxford University
- Philip Broadley, Prudential plc, 2005; made the group more visible and urged the SEC to accept accounts prepared under IFRS without a reconciliation to US GAAP
- Ashley Almanza, BG Group (2007)
- Andy Halford, Vodafone (2010)
- Robin Freestone, Pearson plc (2012)
- Simon Dingemans, GlaxoSmithKline (2014)
- Andrew Bonfield, National Grid, (2016)
- Brian Gilvary, BP, (2018) - current chairman
