= Alan Higgs =

British businessman

Alan Edward Higgs was a businessman who became a multimillionaire mainly from his house building business in Coventry, as well as from other businesses in Birmingham, England. He died in 1979, and because he thought that inherited wealth did more harm than good, he made provision for a charity to be created after his death to help deprived children from Coventry and nearby localities.

== Alan Edward Higgs Charity ==
The Alan Edward Higgs Charity (sometimes incorrectly called the Alan Higgs Trust) benefited from Higgs's entire estate of approximately £26 million. It was set up specifically to help deprived children from Coventry. Higgs's son Derek Higgs, who was knighted in 2004, and his daughter became the trustees.

The charity has given millions of pounds to good causes over the years. It gave the money to build The Alan Higgs Centre, a leisure centre in southeast Coventry, and partly owned the Ricoh Arena.
