= Kent College =

Public school in Canterbury, Kent, England

Kent College, Canterbury

Location
- Whitstable Road; Canterbury, Kent, CT2 9DT; England
- Coordinates: 51°17′36″N 1°03′19″E

Information
- Type: Public School; Private day and boarding school
- Motto: Lux Tua Via Mea (Latin: Your Light is My Way)
- Religious affiliation: Methodist
- Established: 1885
- Headmaster: Mark Turnbull
- Age: 11 to 18
- Enrolment: c. 750
- Houses: Marlowe, Augustine, Becket, Chaucer
- Colours: Maroon, red, navy
- Publication: Kent College Times
- Former Pupils: Old Canterburians
- Houses: Boys: Elfick, Gamon, Guilford. Girls: Austen, Wesley
- Website: www.kentcollege.com

Kent College, Canterbury is an English co-educational private school for boarding and day pupils between the ages of 3 months and 18 years. It was founded in 1885, and is a member of the Headmasters' and Headmistresses' Conference. Originally established as a boys' public school, it admitted girls into the sixth form in 1973 and since 1975 it has been fully co-educational.

The senior school occupies a semi-rural site of some 70 acres (280,000 m^{2}) on the edge of the city of Canterbury, and also owns the nearby Moat Estate, where there is a farm, managed by staff and pupils, and sports pitches. These are adjacent to Blean Forest.

Its junior school is about a mile away, and provides day school education for boys and girls between the ages of 3 and 11, and boarding for children aged 7 and above.

Kent College Dubai is a secondary campus of the Canterbury school which is located in Meydan City, Dubai, United Arab Emirates. The school opened in September 2016.

It was announced in 2018 that a further overseas campus was to be opened in Hong Kong.

== History ==
The school was founded in 1885 as the Wesleyan College, Canterbury. Built on land made available by Edward Pillow, a local farmer – recognition of which endures by way of the school's "Pillow Prize" – the foundation stone for the main building was laid in 1887. The architect was Charles Bell. In 1920 Kent College was acquired by the Board of Management for Methodist Residential Schools. Buildings forming a quadrangle were erected to the rear of the main building and the chapel. In 1945, the school became a direct grant grammar school.

== School ==
Kent College is a Methodist school, although it accepts pupils of all religions. Originally established as a boys' school, it took girls into the sixth form in 1973, and since 1975 it has been fully co-educational. Kent College has thirteen independent "sister schools" in Great Britain, most of which are co-educational though three, including Kent College, Pembury, are girls' schools.

== Inspection ==
In 2009 the school was subject to an independent school inspection. The report observed with regard to the Senior School that "the school provides an excellent quality of education"; "the school is able to adapt the curriculum to suit the learning needs of individual pupils"; "the school achieves its aims to enable pupils to maximise their potential and to attain high levels of achievement"; "the quality of teaching...is high"; "pastoral care and the provision for the welfare, health and safety of pupils are outstanding"; "links with parents and the community are excellent, as is the boarding education"; and "the school has no major weaknesses".

In 2015 the school was subject to another independent school inspection, in which all areas of the school were judged to be 'excellent in every aspect'.

In 2011 boarding at Kent College was rated as outstanding by OfSted.

== Old Canterburians (notable students) ==
- Luke Akehurst, Member of Parliament for North Durham
- Guy Berryman, bass player for British music band Coldplay
- Besa (singer), Albanian singer
- Tim Clark, president of the Emirates airline
- Ptolemy Dean, architect, and resident "ruin detective" on the BBC television programme, Restoration
- Tacita Dean, English visual artist
- Simon Dingemans, banker and businessman
- Thomas Dunhill, English composer and writer
- David Eades, BBC journalist and newsreader
- Natascha Engel, Labour Member of Parliament, Deputy Speaker of the House of Commons, Second Deputy Chairman of Ways and Means
- Thomas Godfrey Evans, cricketer, for Kent and England
- Christopher Fairbank, actor, best known for his role in hit comedy-drama series Auf Wiedersehen, Pet
- Reginald Hine, solicitor and historian
- John Inge, Bishop of Worcester
- Donna Langley, chair of Universal Pictures and Universal Filmed Entertainment Group
- John Redwood, Conservative Member of Parliament for Wokingham
- Simon Scarrow, historical fiction author
- Anthony Scrivener, British barrister
- Mike Weatherley, Conservative Member of Parliament for Hove
- Mimi Webb (Amelia Webb), Singer songwriter signed to Epic Records
- Raymond Yiu, Composer and conductor
