= The Alan Higgs Centre =

The Alan Higgs Centre, Coventry
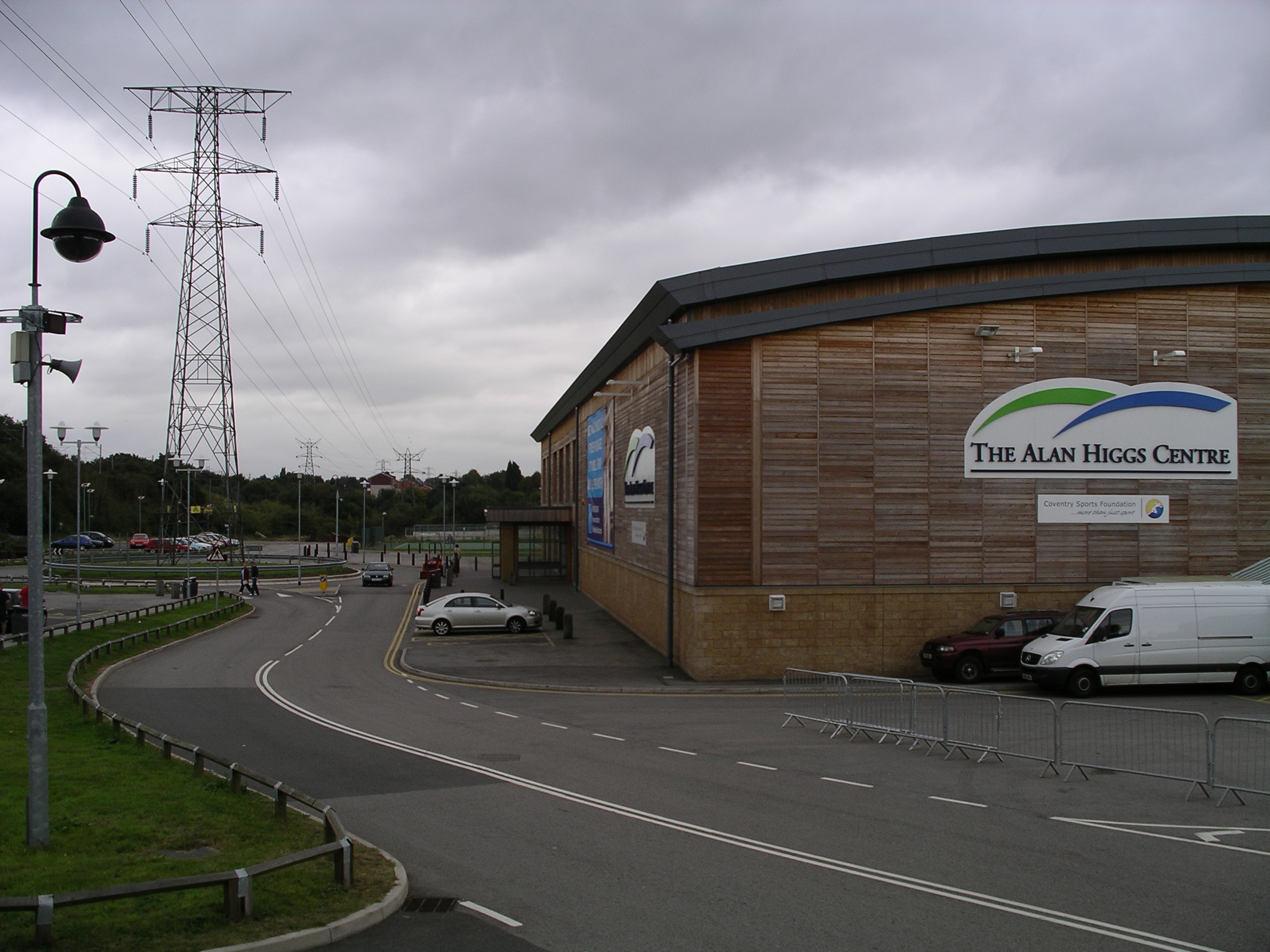
- The main building of the Alan Higgs Centre
- Interactive map of the The Alan Higgs Centre, Coventry area

General information
- Type: Leisure centre
- Location: Allard Way, Coventry, England
- Coordinates: 52.39239°N 1.47122°W
- Completed: 2004
- Owner: Alan Higgs Centre Trust

Design and construction
- Architect: RHWL

Website
- https://cvlife.co.uk/centres/the-alan-higgs-centre/

The Alan Higgs Centre is a leisure centre situated in about 80 acres (32 ha) grounds near to the River Sowe, on Allard Way in the south-east of Coventry, England.

== History ==
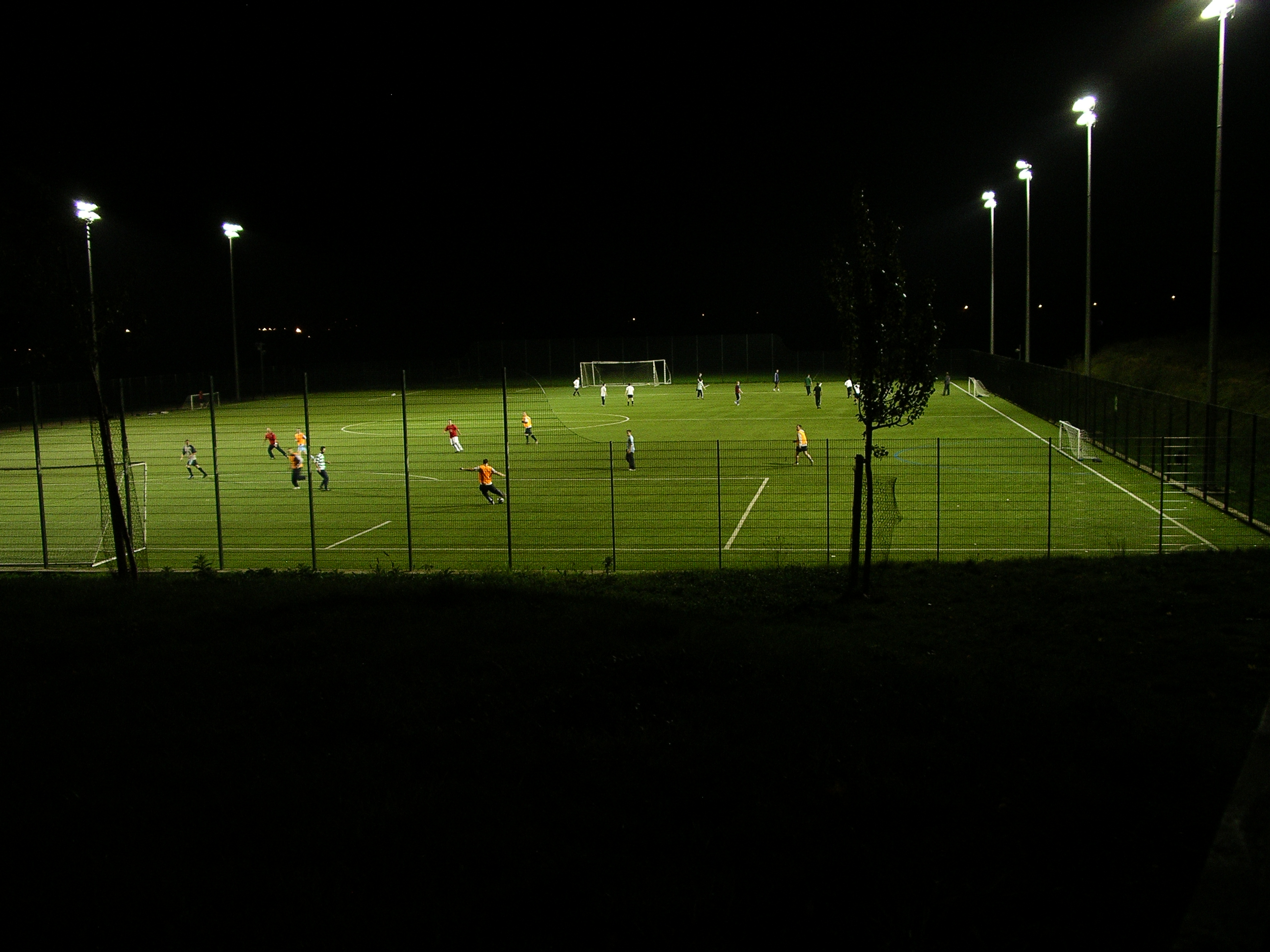
The floodlit outdoor synthetic pitch which accommodates one football pitch or two netball pitches

The building was funded by the Alan Higgs Charity. It was designed by RHWL architects, built by Galliford Try at a cost of about £8 million, and was opened in September 2004.

The judo and volleyball competitions of the 2007 UK School Games were held in The Alan Higgs Centre, being one of the venues for the games which were held in the Coventry from 23 to 26 August 2007. In August 2013, non-league football team Coventry United announced that The Alan Higgs Centre would be their new home ground. On 12 February 2019, a new dome opened. In February 2020 a new Olympic-sized swimming pool at the Alan Higgs Centre opened, replacing the one at the defunct Coventry Sports & Leisure Centre. The new pool facilities include a hot tub, a sauna, and seating for 500 people.

== Facilities ==
The Coventry City Football Club's Academy is based at The Alan Higgs Centre. There are four outdoor grass football pitches, a synthetic indoor pitch, and a synthetic floodlit outdoor pitch. It is also a venue for county netball games, and there is a skateboard area.
