= Patisserie Valerie =

Chain of cafés in the United Kingdom

- Type: Pâtisserie, café
- Genre: Café chain and bakery
- Founded: 1926, Soho, London
- Founder: Madame Valerie
- Fate: Management buyout
- Headquarters: Birmingham, England, UK
- Number of locations: 5 (2025)
- Area served: United Kingdom
- Key people: James Fleming, chief executive officer
- Parent: Causeway Capital
- Website: www.patisserie-valerie.co.uk

Patisserie Valerie was formerly a significant high street cake business that operated in the United Kingdom. The business specialises in handmade birthday cakes, pastries and other fancy cakes which can either be ordered online for delivery throughout the UK, or bought at one of the company's local patisseries. Patisserie Valerie's products are also supplied on a wholesale basis to retailers and food service operators.

The business was founded in 1926 in the Soho district of the West End of London and has been majority-owned by Irish-based growth investor Causeway Capital since February 2019.

Patisserie Valerie was mentioned in one of the contact books of the first Epstein files release.

== History ==
=== Foundation (1926) ===
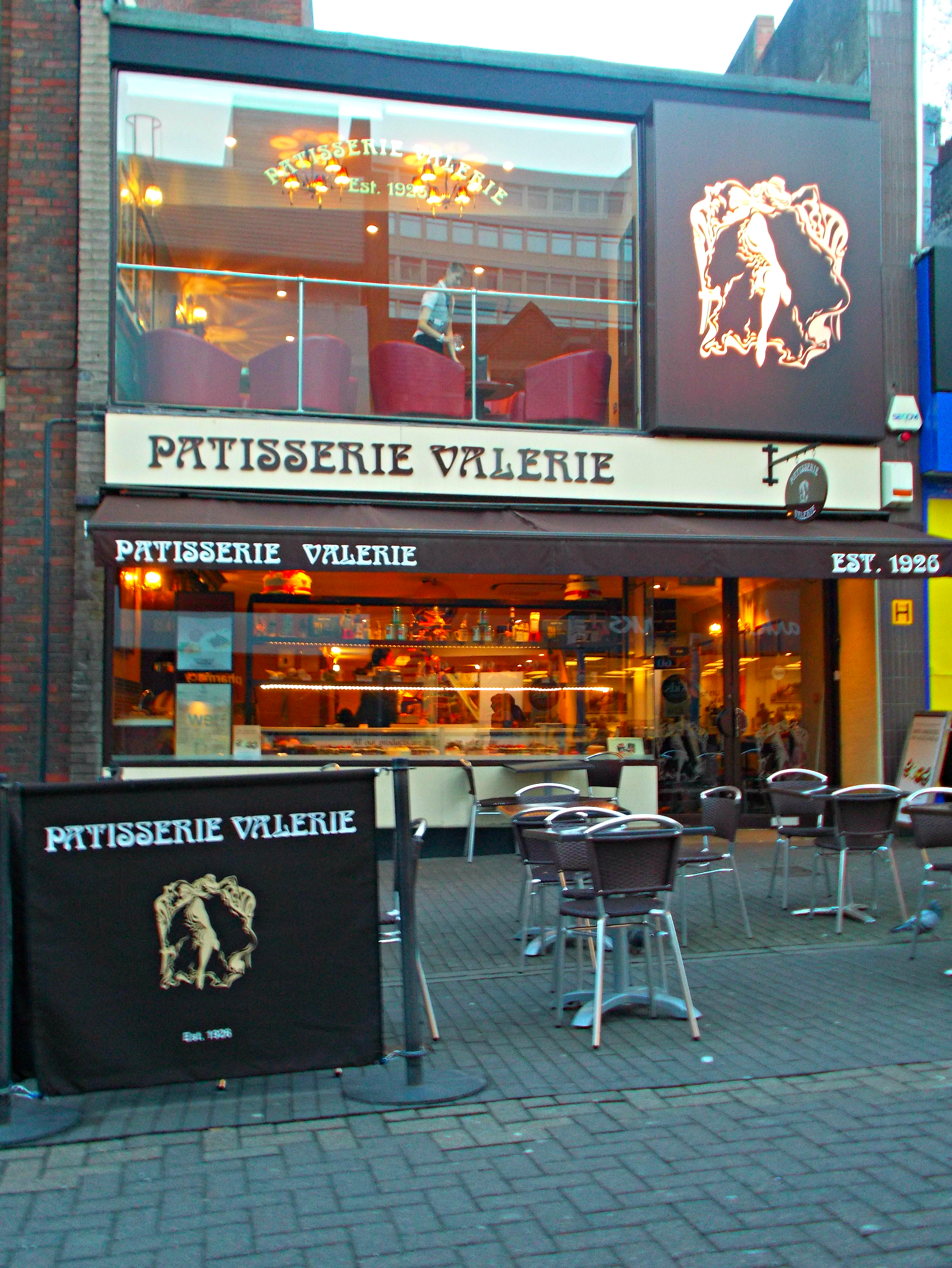
The Sutton, London branch in Sutton High Street

According to Helene (Leni) Vermeirsch, the niece of the founders, Patisserie Valerie was established in 1926 on the corner of Dean Street and Old Compton Street in Soho, London by Esther van Gyseghem, born in Ostend, Belgium on 22 April 1900, and her husband Theophile (Theo) Vermeirsch. There is not known to have been a Valerie in the founders' families, but Esther came to be referred to as Madame Valerie. Theo died in 1947, and Esther ran Patisserie Valerie alone until she retired in 1965. Leni Vermeirsch believes that her aunt sold the business to an Italian businessman based in Soho. The Soho Clarion magazine claimed that the Fonteyn family founded Patisserie Valerie; there is some evidence of them in Soho and in the catering business. Patisserie Valerie remained at its original location until it was bombed during World War II, and reopened in nearby Old Compton Street after Theo and Esther spent a short time in Norfolk.

=== Initial expansion (1987–2014) ===
The Scalzo brothers bought it in 1987 from descendants of the founder, and grew the business to nine branches, including shops in Piccadilly and Kensington. In 2006, Luke Johnson's Risk Capital Partners acquired the Scalzo brothers' controlling stake in the company. At the time of the acquisition, Luke Johnson said:

We have significant experience of rolling out successful food and drink concepts, including Pizza Express, Strada and Giraffe. Patisserie Valerie is a much-loved institution with tremendous heritage. We are confident there are many upscale locations across Britain's cities that would love the authentic pastries, cakes and savouries supplied by Patisserie Valerie.

The chain expanded rapidly after 2006, growing from eight shops in 2006 to 192 as of May 2017. It opened its first shop in Ireland in 2017, in Debenhams in Blanchardstown Centre.

Leni Vermeirsch said when Patisserie Valerie was struggling in early 2019, "What ended up being called Patisserie Valerie did not bear any resemblance to the original one".

=== Stockmarket listing ===
In April 2014 the company announced plans to raise £33m on the London Alternative Investment Market, using the sum to reduce its debt.

=== Share suspension and collapse into administration ===
Trading in the shares of Patisserie Holdings, the parent company of Patisserie Valerie, were suspended on 10 October 2018 following the discovery of potentially fraudulent accounting irregularities, which had led to the possibility that there had been a material misstatement of the company's accounts. It was widely reported in the press that there was a multimillion pound black hole in the company's accounts. Luke Johnson, the company chairman, said: "We are all deeply concerned about this news and the potential impact on the business".

In October 2018, the company announced that there was a material shortfall between the reported financial status and the current financial status of the business and that without an immediate injection of capital the directors were of the view that there would be no scope for the business to continue trading in its current form. Following the announcement, Hertfordshire police issued a statement that: "A 44-year old man from St Albans has been arrested on suspicion of fraud by false representation. He has been released under investigation." It was widely reported that the individual concerned was Chris Marsh, the firm's finance director. The Serious Fraud Office announced on its website that it had opened an investigation into an individual at the company. Later that day the company announced details of a rescue plan under which it would borrow £20 million from Johnson and place 31,451,100 ordinary shares at 50 pence to raise new capital of approximately £15.7m before payment of expenses. The rescue plan prevented the imminent bankruptcy of the company and subsequent loss of 2,500 jobs, but was criticised in The Daily Telegraph as being against the interests of smaller shareholders.

On 14 October, it was reported that two unauthorised and unreported overdrafts of almost £10 million had been discovered.

On 22 January 2019, the firm announced that it had collapsed into administration following failed talks with banks, which the company stated was a "direct result of the significant fraud". The collapse lead to the immediate closure of 70 of the nearly 200 stores and concessions operated by the group – including both of its original flagship branches in Soho – leading to the loss of around 900 jobs.

In November 2018, the Financial Reporting Council (FRC) had launched an investigation into accountant Grant Thornton's audit of Patisserie Valerie. In November 2020, the Joint Liquidators said: "We can confirm that the joint liquidators of companies within the Patisserie Valerie Group have issued a claim for damages against Grant Thornton in respect of their audits of the group companies' financial statements for the financial periods 30 September 2014 to September 2017 inclusive", as the findings of the investigation were awaited. Following the investigation, Grant Thornton was fined £2.3m because it had "missed red flags" and failed to "question information provided by management".

=== Criminal fraud trial ===
On 13 September 2023, the Serious Fraud Office (United Kingdom) (SFO) charged four suspects relating to the fraud investigation of the collapse of the company which led to the loss of 900 jobs and the closure of 70 sites. The suspects were named as Christopher Marsh, who formerly served as Patisserie Holdings' chief financial officer, his accountant wife Louise Marsh, financial controller Pritesh Mistry and financial consultant Nileshkumar Lad. The statement read: "The SFO has charged all four suspects with conspiring to inflate the cash in Patisserie Holdings' balance sheets and annual reports from 2015 to 2018, including by providing false documentation to the company's auditors". The four were booked to appear in Westminster Magistrates Court in October that year for their criminal fraud trial.

=== Management buyout ===
On 14 February 2019, Patisserie Valerie announced that its administrators, KPMG, had concluded an agreement for a management buyout funded by Causeway Capital Partners to acquire the assets and business of the chain from administration, paying £5m for nearly 100 cafés employing some two-thirds of the 3,000 workers. AF Blakemore & Son, the largest operator of UK Spar convenience stores, also acquired 21 Philpotts sandwich shops that were part of the Patisserie Valerie group; both acquisitions together totalled £13m. New managing director Paolo Peretti planned to spend more than £1m to revamp about 30 of its cafes, and to open a few new sites the following year.

In March 2020, Causeway Capital merged the Patisserie Valerie chain (trimmed from 96 sites to 75) with its Bakers & Baristas business; stores would continue operating under their individual brands and retain their existing in-store offerings.

In September 2022, the firm announced that an additional nine sites would close, leaving approximately 95 Patisserie Valerie and Bakers & Baristas sites operating.

=== Recent developments (2020–) ===
In May 2020, Patisserie Valerie enhanced its online click and collect offering and launched a nationwide direct to consumer online cake shop.

Patisserie Valerie's online cake product offering has been expanded since to include wedding cakes, vegan cakes, gift products and coffee subscriptions. In 2024, Patisserie Valerie launched an Amazon store with a selection of online cakes.

A selection of Patisserie Valerie's cakes were available in many Sainsbury's stores following a wholesale partnership rolled out in 2021 until May 2025. This wholesale offering was expanded to include other foodservice operators.

In 2023, Patisserie Valerie completed a major refurbishment of its patisserie in Cribbs Causeway which included a refreshed colour palette and design touches to reflect the brand's history in 1920s Soho.

As of September 2026 there were only 8 branches operating.
