= NYSE Listed Company Manual =

The NYSE Listed Company Manual is a set of regulations applicable to all corporations who wish to sell securities by listing themselves on the New York Stock Exchange. The Manual covers regulations on how a corporation's board should be composed, its internal audit and remuneration committees function, the voting rights of stockholders, standards for disclosure when issuing shares, and so forth.

== Content ==
It comprises the Listing Procedure, Disclosure and Reporting of Essential Information, Corporate Accountability, Shareholders' Meetings and Proxies, Certificate Formats, Listing Submissions, Suspension and Removal, and Forms for Exchange.

== See also ==
- US corporate law
- UK company law
- London Stock Exchange
- Listing Rules
