= QCA Corporate Governance Code =

U.K corporate governance document

The QCA Corporate Governance Code is a corporate governance code published by the Quoted Companies Alliance (QCA).

It is the corporate governance code adopted by the majority of companies on the AIM market in the UK. London Stock Exchange rules allow companies on AIM to choose which code they adopt and referenced two options as "recognised corporate governance codes". These are:

1. The QCA Corporate Governance Code
2. The UK Corporate Governance Code

A review of all 927 companies on AIM at the end of 2018 showed that 89% had chosen to apply the QCA Corporate Governance Code, with 6% applying the UK Corporate Governance Code, and 5% applying a range of other codes.
