= Turnbull Report =

Internal Control: Guidance for Directors on the Combined Code (1999) also known as the "Turnbull Report" was a report drawn up with the London Stock Exchange for listed companies. The committee which wrote the report was chaired by Nigel Turnbull of The Rank Group plc. The report informed directors of their obligations under the Combined Code with regard to keeping good "internal controls" in their companies, or having good audits and checks to ensure the quality of financial reporting and catch any fraud before it becomes a problem.

Revised guidance was issued in 2005. The report was superseded by a further FRC guidance issued in September 2014.

== See also ==
- UK company law
- Corporate Governance
- Cadbury Report (1992), Financial Aspects of Corporate Governance, on corporate governance generally. Pdf file here
- Greenbury Report (1995) on director remuneration. Pdf here
- Hampel Report (1998), review of corporate governance since Cadbury, pdf here and online with the EGCI here
- Myners Report (2001), Institutional Investment in the United Kingdom: A Review on institutional investors, Pdf file here and Review of Progress Report here
- Higgs Report (2003) Review of the role and effectiveness of non-executive directors. Pdf here
- Smith Report (2003) on auditors. Pdf here
