= Jan du Plessis =

British-South African businessman

Sir Jan Du Plessis
- Born: Jan du Plessis; 22 January 1954 (age 72); Cape Town, Cape Province, Union of South Africa
- Education: University of Stellenbosch
- Occupation: Businessman
- Years active: 1975–present
- Title: Chairman of BT Group
- Term: 2017–2021
- Successor: Adam Crozier

Sir Jan Petrus du Plessis (born 22 January 1954) is a British-South African businessman. He was the non-executive chairman of BT Group, and the former non-executive chairman of Rio Tinto Group plc, and a former non-executive director of the Lloyds TSB Group. Du Plessis was placed tenth in The Times 2006 Power 100, a list which rates the most powerful people in British business.

== Early and personal life ==
Du Plessis, an Afrikaner, grew up near Cape Town, South Africa. He studied at the University of Stellenbosch for degrees in commerce and law, and is also qualified as a chartered accountant in his home country. He has dual British and South African citizenship and lives in Buckinghamshire with his wife. Although he was once a prominent figure in the tobacco industry, du Plessis has never smoked.

== Career ==
Du Plessis worked in various management positions in the South African Rembrandt Group from 1981, and in 1988 he became Group Finance Director of Compagnie Financière Richemont. He also held the same position at tobacco manufacturer Rothmans International between 1990 and 1995. When Rothmans International was merged with British American Tobacco in 1999, du Plessis became a non-executive director on that board.

In April 2004, du Plessis left his position at Richemont to take on the role of non-executive chairman at British American Tobacco. In June 2005, he was appointed non-executive chairman of the UK food business RHM. In October of the same year, du Plessis joined the board of directors at the Lloyds TSB Group as a non-executive director.

Du Plessis is also a member of the governing body of the International Chamber of Commerce UK.

In March 2009, it was announced that he would be the new chairman of mining group Rio Tinto. In 2014 he was appointed to the board of SAB Miller and July 2015 took over as the chairman.

On 9 March 2017, BT announced that du Plessis would be taking over as chairman from November 2017. On 1 March 2021, du Plessis announced he was retiring. He was succeeded by Adam Crozier.

In December 2021, du Plessis was nominated by the UK Government to lead the UK's accounting and auditing regulator, the Financial Reporting Council, through its transformation into the Audit, Reporting and Governance Authority. In February 2022, du Plessis was confirmed as the FRC's new chair.

Du Plessis was knighted in the 2022 New Year Honours for services to telecommunications and business.

Business positions
Preceded by Sir Michael Rake	Chairman of BT Group; 2017–2021	Succeeded by Adam Crozier
