= Simon Dingemans =

Former English banker and businessman

Simon Paul Dingemans (born April 1963) is an English former banker and businessman. Until May 2019 he was chief financial officer at GlaxoSmithKline. In July 2019 he was appointed chair of the Financial Reporting Council, and was set to lead its transition into the Audit, Reporting and Governance Authority, but left in May 2020.

== Education ==
Dingemans was educated at Kent College and Christ Church, Oxford where he gained a master's degree in geography. He was involved in theatre production at the Oxford Playhouse.

== Career ==
Dingemans joined S. G. Warburg & Co. as a graduate trainee, spending 15 years with the firm before moving to Goldman Sachs to run its UK investment banking and European mergers businesses.

Dingemans spent 25 years at Goldman Sachs, becoming head of European mergers and acquisitions, and overseeing £411 billion ($500 billion) of deals, including Vodafone's £112bn merger with Mannesmann in 2000, the private equity takeover of Alliance Boots, and Novartis's $28.1bn (£18.2bn) takeover of Alcon.

In 2011, he joined GlaxoSmithKline as CFO and served as a member of the main board before stepping down in May 2019. During his eight years at GSK, he oversaw extensive restructuring and re-shaping of the group.

In July 2019 Business Secretary Greg Clark announced that Dingemans had been appointed as the new chair of the Financial Reporting Council, and would lead its transition into the Audit, Reporting and Governance Authority. However, he left the role in May 2020, citing conflicts between the part-time role and other positions he was interested in taking.

In June 2020 Dingemans joined Carlyle Group as a managing director in charge of UK buyouts and overseeing healthcare deals across Europe.

=== Non-executive roles ===
Dingemans was chairman of the Hundred Group of finance directors between 2014 and 2016. He was appointed a trustee of the Donmar Warehouse theatre in 2018, having previously done theatre production at the Oxford Playhouse and also supported the Royal National Theatre.

He is an investor in wealth management firm Netwealth Investments.

== Personal life ==
Dingemans is married with three children. He has participated in triathlons.
