= Michael Rake =

British businessman

Sir Michael Rake
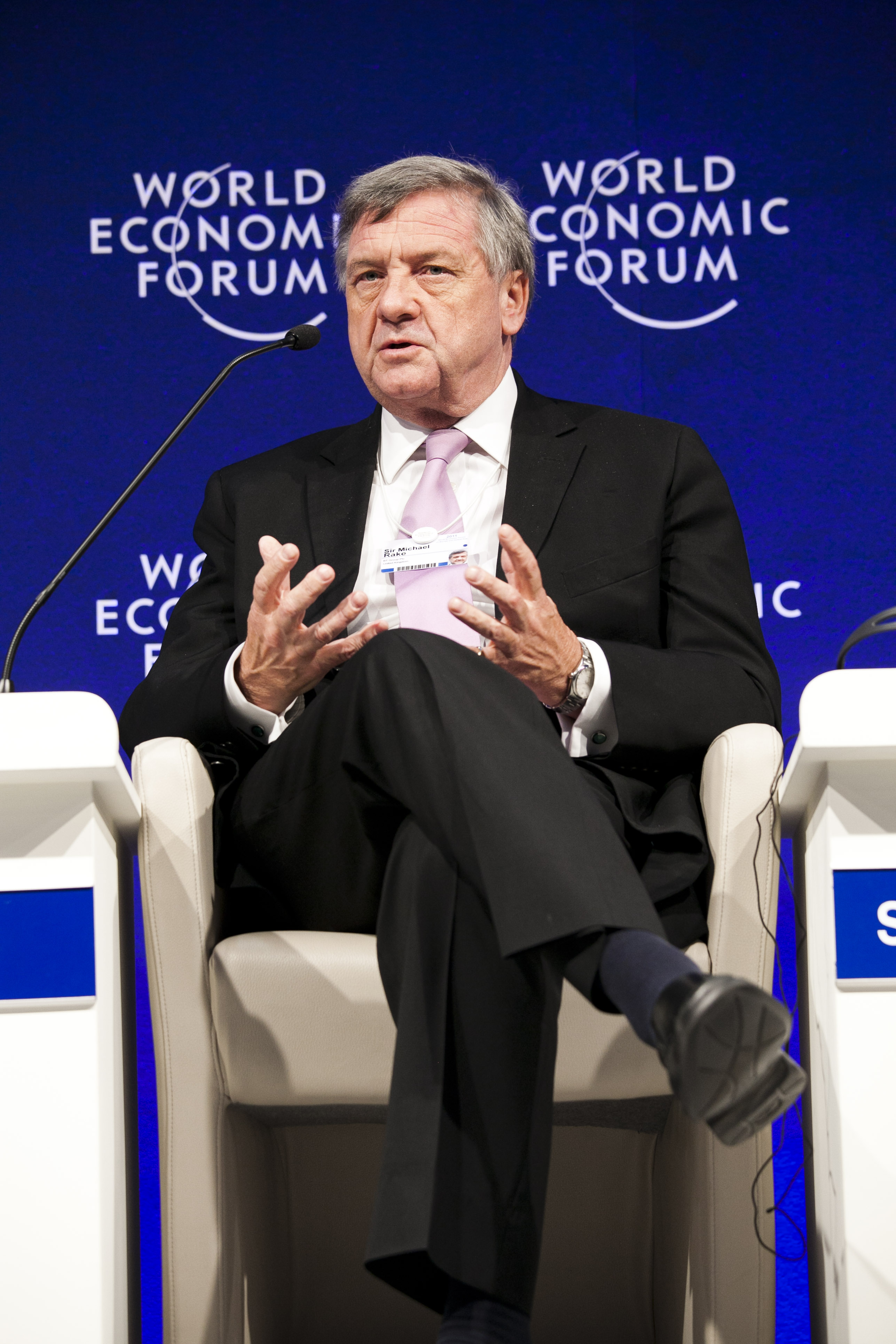
- Sir Michael Rake at the World Economic Forum on Europe and Central Asia held in Vienna, Austria, 8 June 2011
- Born: Michael Derek Vaughan Rake; 17 January 1948 (age 78); Rugby, Warwickshire, England
- Occupations: Chairman, Great Ormond Street Hospital
- Spouse(s): Julia Cook (1970); Caroline Thomas (1986)
- Children: 4
- Parent(s): Derek Shannon Vaughan Rake; Rosamond Barrett

Sir Michael Derek Vaughan Rake (born 17 January 1948) is a British businessman, former chairman of BT Group, former chairman of Worldpay and a director of S&P Global. He served as president of the CBI from 2013 until 2015. He was appointed to the board of Huawei Technologies UK on 14 April 2020, having worked as an advisor for the company since 1 January 2019.

== Early life ==
Rake was born in Rugby on 17 January 1948, the son of Group Captain Derek Shannon Vaughan Rake OBE AFC and Bar and Rosamond née Barrett. He went to prep school in Devon, followed by Wellington College. He qualified as a chartered accountant.

== Career ==
He joined KPMG in 1974, and worked in continental Europe before transferring to the Middle East to run the practice for three years in 1986. He transferred to London in 1989, became a member of the UK board in 1991, had a number of leadership roles in the UK before being elected UK Senior Partner in 1998. He was Chairman of KPMG in Europe and Senior Partner of KPMG in the United Kingdom, prior to his appointment as chairman of KPMG International in May 2002, in which capacity he served till September 2007.

== Board positions ==
Rake was chairman of Business in the Community from 2004 to 2007 and a member of the board of the Prince of Wales International Business Leaders Forum between 1998 and 2007. He was chairman of easyJet from 2010 to April 2013.

Rake is a vice president of the RNIB, a member of the board of the TransAtlantic Business Dialogue, the Chartered Management Institute, the DTI's US/UK Regulatory Taskforce, the Advisory Council for Business for New Europe, the Ethnic Minority Employment Taskforce, an Association Member of BUPA, The School of Oriental and African Studies advisory board, the advisory board of the Judge Institute at the University of Cambridge, Senior Adviser for Chatham House and the Global Advisory Board of the Oxford University Centre for Corporate Reputation. Rake is also a governor of Wellington College and a board member of Guards Polo Club. Rake was on the board of Barclays from 2008 to December 2015; he was promoted to deputy chairman in 2012, but turned down the offer to become chairman.

As of 2013, Rake was a trustee of The Prince of Wales's Charitable Foundation. He was president of the CBI from June 2013 to July 2015.

Rake was appointed Chairman of Great Ormond Street Hospital in 2017.

== Personal life ==
He is married with four children and five stepchildren, and was knighted in 2007. Rake donated £5,000 to Ed Davey's 2020 Liberal Democrats leadership election campaign.

== Honors ==
- Grand Cordon of the Order of the Rising Sun (2020)

Business positions
Preceded by Sir Christopher Bland	Chairman of BT Group; 2007–2017	Succeeded by Jan du Plessis
