= UK Individual Shareholders Society =

ShareSoc (the short name and registered trade mark of the UK Individual Shareholders Society Ltd) is a campaigning organisation that represents and supports individual investors who invest in the UK regulated share market. ShareSoc is a not for profit organisation with over 9,500 members, making it the UK's largest representative body for individual investors.

ShareSoc provides a monthly newsletter, educational events, networking opportunities and general advice to members on stock market investment. They maintain a social networking site that is private to members which contains forums on policy issues, topical blogs, campaign information and meeting details.

Membership of ShareSoc is open to anyone with an interest in stock market investment. ShareSoc is funded from membership fees, from donations, from educational activities and from other services it provides to members. Recent membership includes Full Membership with extra rights.

ShareSoc was formed in early 2011. It is a member of The European Federation of Investors and The World Federation of Investors Corporations.

Founding Directors of ShareSoc were Roger Lawson, David Blundell, Gavin FL Palmer, Stan Grierson, Tony Prynne and David Stredder.

Early Campaigns a partial list

2011 Shareholder Nomination to the AGM Committees SNAC or 'Shareholder Committee'.

2014 Shareholder Rights Campaign - Rights being returned to owners from nominee accounts and custodians.

2016 RBS PLC - Shareholder Committee resolutions.

2018 Beaufort Client Securities - Charges by advisers on a failed stockbrokers assets and client accounts.

2020 Sirius Minerals PLC - Takeover by Anglo American PLC possible misuse of Convertible Bonds.

== Merger with SIGnet ==
In September 2019, ShareSoc merged with SIGnet, a national network of groups of investors. SIGnet was founded by John Lander in 1998 and has groups across the United Kingdom. Group members meet with the aim of improving their investment skills by learning from each other and evaluating investment themes.
