= George Ross Goobey =

British fund manager

George Ross Goobey (23 May 1911 – 19 March 1999) was a British fund manager, famous for being the first to see that pension funds should buy equities.

He was born in East London, and trained as an actuary as his family could not afford to send him to university.

In 1947, aged 36, he was appointed as fund manager for Imperial Tobacco's pension fund. At this time the yield on British government bonds, or gilts, was less than the yield on equities, even though the economy was growing. However pension funds did not generally invest in equities. He persuaded the fund to switch virtually all of its investments into the equity market, which was very profitable.

He married in 1937, to Gladys Menzies and they had a daughter and a son, Alastair Ross Goobey.
