= Derek Higgs =

British businessman

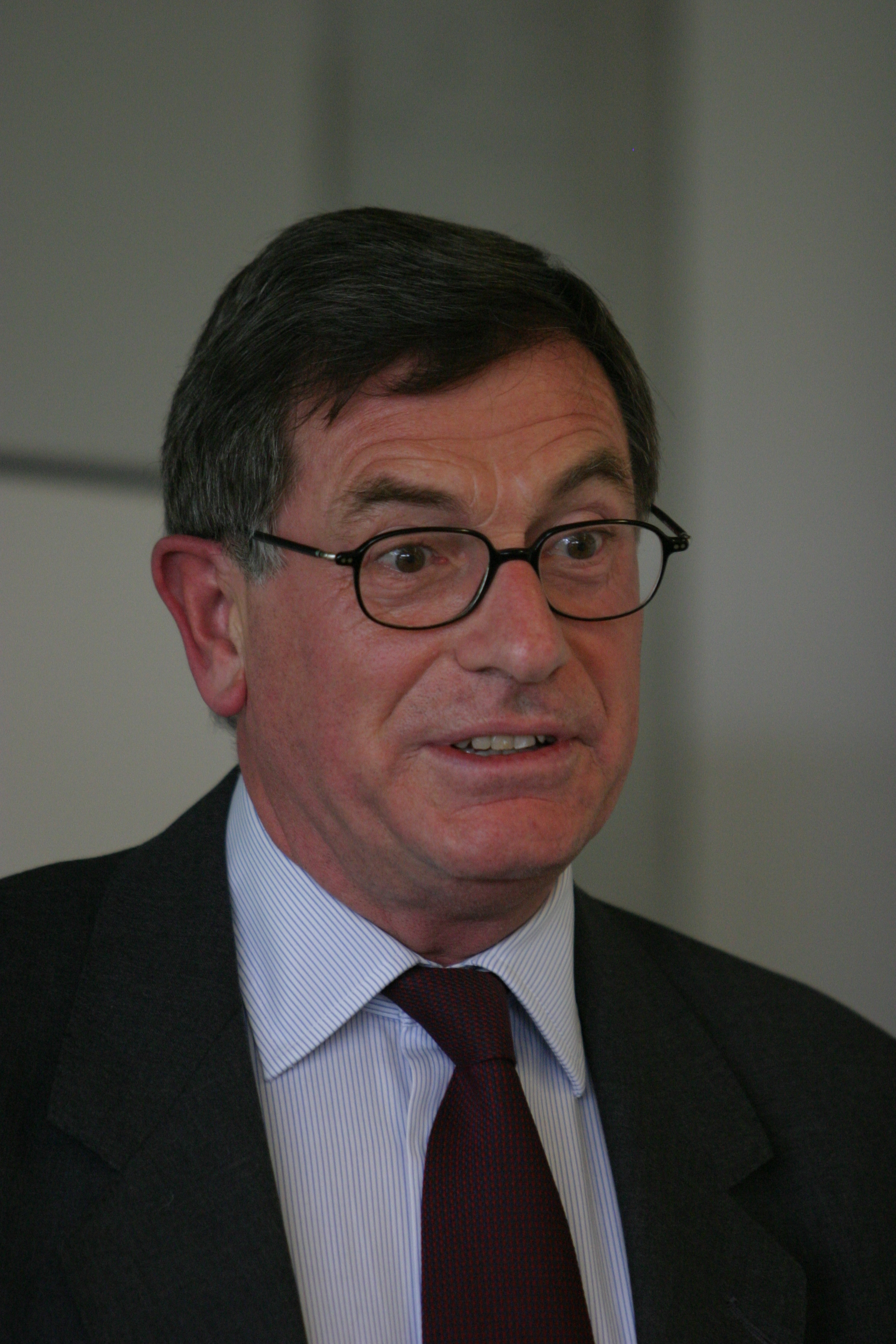
- Higgs in 2004
- Born: 3 April 1944; Birmingham, UK
- Died: 28 April 2008 (aged 64); London, UK
- Occupation: Businessman
- Known for: Higgs review (2003).
- Spouse(s): Julia Higgs, née Arguile (married 1970–2008)
- Children: 3

Sir Derek Alan Higgs (3 April 1944 – 28 April 2008) was an English businessman and merchant banker. He was knighted in 2004. His father, Alan Higgs, was a multimillionaire through property businesses in the Midlands.

== Early life ==
Sir Derek was born in Birmingham, Warwickshire and was educated at Solihull School, and in 1963 he went to the University of Bristol and graduated in Economics and Accounting in 1966.

== Business career ==
After graduating from the University of Bristol in 1966, Sir Derek joined Price Waterhouse, a large accountancy firm, and after training he qualified as a Chartered Accountant. In 1969 he became a corporate finance executive at Baring Brothers, a merchant bank. He moved-on and joined S. G. Warburg & Co. in 1972 and continued his career in merchant banking. He was also a board member of several companies including Prudential, British Land, and Coventry City Football Club.

In 2002 the British Labour Government commissioned Sir Derek to chair the Review of the role and effectiveness of non-executive directors. The report, widely known as the "Higgs review" or "Higgs report", was published on 20 January 2003 and many of its recommendations for large companies have been implemented.

In October 2005 he became the chairman of the Alliance & Leicester bank and worked there through difficult times, which were partly caused by the credit crunch that took effect during 2007 in Britain.

== Trustee ==
His father, Alan, died in 1979. As he felt inherited wealth did more harm than good, Alan Higgs left his entire fortune to a charity to be created after his death to help deprived children from Coventry and nearby localities. The Alan Edward Higgs Charity (also sometimes incorrectly called the Alan Higgs Trust) was set up, and Sir Derek and his sister became the trustees. In January 2008 he also became one of the trustees of the Scott Trust, a British non-profit organisation which owns the Guardian Media Group. He has been on the Board of Trustees of The Architecture Foundation.

== Personal life ==
Sir Derek married Julia Arguile in 1970 and they had two sons and one daughter. He died unexpectedly owing to a heart attack aged 64 years on 28 April 2008 in a London hospital.
