= Polly Peck =

Former British textile company

Polly Peck International PLC
- Type: Public
- Industry: Fashion industry
- Founded: 1940
- Defunct: 1991
- Fate: Bankrupt & broken up
- Headquarters: London, UK
- Key people: Asil Nadir (CEO)
- Products: Textile
- Number of employees: Circa 17,000

Polly Peck International (PPI) was a small British textile company which expanded rapidly in the 1980s and became a constituent of the FTSE 100 Index before collapsing in 1991 with debts of £1.3 billion, eventually leading to the flight of its CEO, Asil Nadir, to Northern Cyprus in 1993. Polly Peck was one of several corporate scandals that led to the reform of UK company law, resulting in the early versions of the UK Corporate Governance Code.

On 26 August 2010, Nadir returned to the UK to try to clear his name. Prosecutors alleged that he stole more than £150 million from Polly Peck and he faced trial on 13 specimen charges totalling £34 million. Nadir was found guilty on 10 counts of theft totalling £29 million. On 23 August 2012 at the Old Bailey, he was sentenced to 10 years in prison.

== History ==
=== Beginnings ===
Polly Peck began in 1940 as a small fashion house, founded by the husband-and-wife team of Raymond and Sybil Zelker. The clothes were designed by Sybil, and the business end was handled by Raymond.

=== The rapid boom years ===
By the end of the 1970s the fashion house was struggling. Early in 1980 Restro Investments, a company Nadir controlled, bought 58% of the company for £270,000.

Asil Nadir took over as Chief Executive on 7 July 1980. On 8 July 1980, Polly Peck launched a rights issue to raise £1.5 million of new capital for investments abroad.

In 1982 Nadir began the early ventures. These included Uni-Pac Packaging Industries Ltd, Voyager Kibris Ltd, and Sunzest Trading Ltd, three companies incorporated in the Turkish Republic of Northern Cyprus.

Uni-Pac was a corrugated box manufacturer and packaging company formed to take advantage of surplus citrus fruit being grown in Cyprus, which was forecast to produce a minimum of £2.1 million profit. Voyager Kibris Ltd was used to purchase the Sheraton Voyager Hotel in Turkey and to build resort hotels in Northern Cyprus.

In September 1982 Nadir acquired a major stake of 57% in a textile trader, Cornell, whose shares were considered penny shares. Cornell rose from 26p to over 100p as soon as Nadir's interest was confirmed. Nadir had Cornell sell a rights issue, raising £2.76 million. This capital, plus a further £6 million from Polly Peck, was used to set up the 'Niksar' mineral water bottling plant in Turkey. Niksar subsequently sold an estimated 100 million bottles of water to the Middle East.

In 1983, Nadir also began expanding PPI's textile business by purchasing a 76 percent stake in Santana Inc. in the United States, and a majority stake in InterCity PLC in the UK. Nadir then extended PPI's textile operations into the Far East, acquiring a majority stake in Impact Textile Group in 1986, and by increasing PPI's existing stake in Shuihing Ltd. to 90 percent. In 1987 PPI acquired a majority interest in Palmon (UAE) Ltd., a manufacturer of casual shirts.

In April 1984, PPI also diversified into the electronics business by acquiring 82 percent ownership of Vestel Electronics, one of the largest publicly traded companies in Turkey. Vestel manufactured colour televisions, Betamax video recorders, air conditioning units, audio equipment, microwave ovens and washing machines. PPI's success in the electronics business was substantially enhanced in early 1986 when Akai of Japan decided to join Ferguson, Salora, and GoldStar as licensors to Vestel. Subsequently, PPI also acquired housewares manufacturer Russell Hobbs.

By 1989 Polly Peck had become an international player by acquiring a 51% majority stake in Sansui (a Japanese electronics company on hard times). This was one of the first foreign acquisitions of a major Japanese company listed on the Tokyo Stock Exchange. Also in 1989, Polly Peck bought the former Del Monte fresh fruit division for $875 million from RJR Nabisco, which had previously acquired it. Polly Peck then gained the ultimate accolade of being admitted to the FTSE 100 Share Index in 1989.

In less than ten years, under this growth-by-acquisition strategy, PPI's market capitalization went from only £300,000 to £1.7 billion at its peak. It became a holding company for a worldwide group of over 200 direct and indirect subsidiary companies.

With pre-tax profits of £161.4 million, net assets of £845 million and 17,227 employees, the Polly Peck group was one of Britain's top one hundred quoted companies. Polly Peck and its subsidiaries were the largest employer in northern Cyprus (after the state) with 7,500 employees there.

=== Attempt to take the company private ===
In August 1990 Nadir came to the view that the company was undervalued and then announced that he was taking it private. Almost as suddenly later that month he announced that he had changed his mind.

=== Collapse ===
An independent investigation by the accountants' Joint Disciplinary Tribunal found that during 1988 Polly Peck made 24 separate payments to its subsidiaries in Turkey and northern Cyprus, totaling £58 million. The following year Polly Peck paid out £141 million in 64 different deals. The report said that "Mr Nadir was able to initiate transfers of funds out of [Polly Peck's] London bank accounts without question or challenge. Further ... he was able to conceal his actions until such time as the cumulative cash outflow became so great that the group was unable to meet its obligations to its bankers." In 1990, Polly Peck's board became so worried about the money transferred into Northern Cyprus that it confronted Mr Nadir and asked him to return it. He refused.

The accounting regulators found that the Inland Revenue had been investigating transactions by a Swiss nominee company, Fax Investments, in shares in Polly Peck and another company run by Mr Nadir's son, Birol. It found a trail of transactions which indicated that money had come from Polly Peck businesses in northern Cyprus to Fax. When confronted about these deals, Mr Nadir told Polly Peck's auditors, Stoy Hayward, that one of the group's Northern Cyprus businesses "provided what were in effect personal banking services for certain Turkish and [Northern Cypriot] residents". The auditors described this arrangement as "extremely unwise transactions". On top of these massive money transfers and "unwise transactions", the regulators found that some of Polly Peck's assets had been secretly registered in Mr Nadir's name. These were all in Northern Cyprus and had a net book value of £25.5 million in 1989. In addition the Didima Hotel development in Northern Cyprus, valued at £15.5 million, and £6.7 million worth of other buildings, had no registered owner. Nadir said he was holding the assets "on trust" for Polly Peck businesses.

On 20 September 1990, the Serious Fraud Office raided South Audley Management, the company that controlled the Nadir family interests. The raid triggered a run on Polly Peck shares. Trading in the company's shares was suspended that day.

PPI's problems became apparent from the structure of the group's debts. The company had over £100 million in short-term revolving lines of credit. Even more debt consisted of long term loans for which Nadir had offered Polly Peck's shares as collateral.

At end of October 1990 an ex-parte application for provisional liquidation was granted at the High Court in London to the London branch of the National Bank of Canada. The directors of Polly Peck met at their London HQ and undertook a course of action leading to voluntary administration.

A considerable number of antiques were located at the HQ offices of the company in Berkeley Square, London. The book value attributed to these was around £6 million, but upon later inspection and independent valuation the total sum was stated at approximately £2.5 to £3 million.

Ultimately the company collapsed, and charges were brought against Nadir for 70 charges of false accounting and the theft, which he denied.

In 1991, Polly Peck Group transferred all of its Vestel Electronics shares to one of its subsidiaries, Collar Holding BV, which was based in the Netherlands. Following the collapse of the Polly Peck Group, PPI was placed in administration. In November 1994, Ahmet Nazif Zorlu acquired PPI from the administrator by buying the entire share capital of Collar Holding BV, which at the time held 82% of the Polly Peck's issued share capital.

=== Leaving the UK and returning ===
Nadir left the UK just after his £3.5 million bail had lapsed, while the detectives who were watching him were off duty to save overtime pay on a bank holiday. He left on a light aircraft to France, where he flew on to Turkish Cyprus, which has no extradition agreement with Britain, and until 26 August 2010 he remained a fugitive in northern Cyprus, which is only recognised by Turkey. Peter Dimond, the pilot who flew him out of Britain, was convicted of aiding a fugitive, but the conviction was quashed once it was determined that the bail had lapsed. In 1996, Mr Nadir's aide Elizabeth Forsyth was convicted of laundering £400,000 stolen from Polly Peck and sentenced to five years. Ten months later, she too was freed by the Appeal Court.

A government minister, Michael Mates, resigned in 1993 following persistent press coverage of his close links to Nadir which had led to Mates writing to the attorney general questioning the handling of the investigation by the Serious Fraud Office. Nadir persistently claimed that the charges that he stole more than £30 million from the company were "baseless", and the SFO abused its powers, making a fair trial impossible. In 2002 the accounting disciplinary body, the Joint Disciplinary Tribunal, fined Stoy Hayward £75,000 for its role as group auditor to Polly Peck. Erdal & Co, the north Cypriot accounting firm was also fined for its audit of the north Cypriot subsidiaries of Polly Peck in 1988 and 1999. In July 2010 it was reported that Nadir intended to seek bail to return to the United Kingdom to face the 66 counts of theft.

Over the years his business interests have shrunk. His hotels were sold to pay off tax debts in 1994, his bank Endustri was taken over by the Central Bank of Northern Cyprus in 2009, and Kibris newspaper, a TV and radio station are all that remains of his known empire.

On 29 July 2010, Nadir began legal proceedings to be granted bail in the UK, allowing him to return. The Serious Fraud Office said if Mr Nadir did return to the UK he would be put on trial for 66 counts of theft. Having received an undertaking that he would once again be given bail but would be kept under electronic surveillance, he returned to the UK on 26 August 2010.

On Friday 3 September 2010, Nadir was put under a midnight to 6 am curfew, an electronic tag and was made to surrender his passport. His trial started on 23 January 2012, on 13 specimen charges of theft and false accounting. On 22 August 2012, Nadir was found guilty on ten counts of theft of nearly £29 million from Polly Peck. The jury found him not guilty on three counts. The jury had been advised at the start of the trial that the 13 were specimen charges and the overall amount allegedly stolen was about £146 million.

He was sentenced to ten years imprisonment.

== See also ==
- United Kingdom company law
- UK Corporate Governance Code
