= Quoted Companies Alliance =

U.K membership organization

- Abbreviation: QCA
- Formation: 1992; 34 years ago
- Type: Nonprofit
- Legal status: Trade association
- Location: London, United Kingdom
- Region served: United Kingdom
- Members: 270+ (2025)
- Official language: English
- Chief Executive: James Ashton
- Funding: Membership fees
- Website: www.theqca.com
- Formerly called: City Group for Smaller Companies

The Quoted Companies Alliance (QCA) is a British trade association that champions the interests of small and mid-size quoted companies in the United Kingdom. The company is not-for-profit. The organisation campaigns on a wide variety of issues and organises surveys and events to inform its membership about making the most of public markets. The organisation has around 300 members of which nearly 200 are quoted companies.

The QCA operates 7 Expert Groups, made up largely of representatives from advisory member firms, that provide pro-bono work on behalf of its members. The expert groups are Primary Markets, Secondary Markets, Corporate Governance, Financial Reporting, Legal, Tax and Share Schemes.

== History ==
The organisation was founded in 1992 and until 2000 was called the City Group for Smaller Companies.

QCA's CEO is James Ashton.

== The QCA Corporate Governance Code ==
The QCA publishes a corporate governance code, the QCA Corporate Governance Code, which is adopted by the vast majority (89%) of companies listed on the Alternative Investment Market (AIM) in the UK.
