= Adrian Cadbury =

British rower and businessman (1929–2015)

Sir George Adrian Hayhurst Cadbury, CH, DL (15 April 1929 – 3 September 2015) was an English businessman who served as the chairman of Cadbury and Cadbury Schweppes for 24 years. He was also a British Olympic rower. Cadbury was a pioneer in raising the awareness and stimulating the debate on corporate governance and, via the Cadbury committee set up by the London Stock Exchange, produced the Cadbury Report, a code of best practice which served as a basis for reform of corporate governance around the world.

== Early life, education and rowing ==
Cadbury was born on 15 April 1929, a member of the Cadbury family, which is known for its Quaker philosophy and for the chocolate conglomerate that it founded. He was educated at Eton and King's College, Cambridge. At Cambridge, he rowed in the losing Cambridge boat in the 1952 Boat Race. He also rowed in the Great Britain coxless four in the 1952 Summer Olympics in Helsinki.

=== Later years ===
Cadbury had two marriages; in 1956, he married Gillian Skepper, who died in 1992, and with whom he had two sons and a daughter. In 1994, he was married for the second time, to Susan Sinclair.

== Life in business ==
He joined the Cadbury business in 1958, and became chairman of Cadbury Ltd in 1965. He retired as chairman of Cadbury Schweppes in 1989. He was a director of the Bank of England from 1970 to 1994, and of IBM from 1975 to 1994. He was chairman of the UK Committee on the Financial Aspects of Corporate Governance which published its Report and Code of Best Practice ("Cadbury Report and Code") in December 1992. Cadbury's report advocated a clear division of responsibilities at the head of a company so that no one individual had too much power. He was a member of the OECD Business Sector Advisory Group on Corporate Governance. His publications include: Ethical Managers Make Their Own Rules; The Company chairman; Corporate Governance and Chairmanship: A Personal View. He was appointed High Sheriff of the West Midlands for 1994–95.

== Support of Aston University ==
Sir Adrian had a long-standing relationship with Aston University in Birmingham. He served as Aston chancellor between 1979 and 2004, later chaired the University's Development Board, and was one of the University's most generous supporters. As chancellor emeritus, Sir Adrian contributed to undergraduate and postgraduate courses, speaking in particular on governance, business ethics and corporate social responsibility. He was also a patron of Aston Raise and Give Society, which is the fundraising body of Aston University. As part of the 60th anniversary celebrations of Aston Business School in 2008, Sir Adrian was awarded a rare Beta Gamma Sigma Business Achievement Award. Aston Business School's MBA lecture theatres were also named after Sir Adrian and Lady Susan Cadbury, in recognition of their long association with Aston University.

== Honours and awards ==
He was made a Knight Bachelor in 1977, thereafter becoming Sir Adrian Cadbury. He was given the Freedom of the City of Birmingham in 1982. He was appointed as a deputy lieutenant (DL) of the West Midlands in 1995.

In recognition of his contribution to commerce, corporate governance and public life, Sir Adrian has received honorary degrees from many universities (including Aston University, the University of Birmingham, Birmingham City University, the University of Cambridge, and the University of Bristol). The Royal Society of Arts awarded Sir Adrian its Albert Medal in 1995, and he received one of the International Corporate Governance Network's inaugural awards in 2001. In early 2008, Sir Adrian was made an honorary fellow of the Institute of Chartered Accountants in England and Wales (ICAEW).

Sir Adrian was a steward of Henley Royal Regatta and the president of Birmingham Rowing Club.

Sir Adrian was appointed Member of the Order of the Companions of Honour (CH) in the 2015 New Year Honours for services to business and the community, especially in Birmingham.

== Death ==
He died on 3 September 2015, aged 86.

== Publications ==
- Cadbury, A. (1992) Report and Code of Best Practice (Cadbury Report and Code), The Committee on the Financial Aspects of Corporate Governance, London: Gee and Company
- Cadbury, Adrian (1995) The Company chairman (2nd Ed), NJ: Prentice Hall, ISBN 0-13-434150-3
- Cadbury, Adrian (2002) Corporate Governance and Chairmanship: A Personal View, Oxford: Oxford University Press, ISBN 0-19-925200-9

== See also ==
- Cadbury
- Corporate Governance
- List of Cambridge University Boat Race crews
