= Fonteyn =

Fonteyn is a Dutch surname. Notable people with the surname include:

- Carel Fonteyn (fl. 1655–1665), Flemish painter
- Margot Fonteyn (1919–1991), English ballerina
- Mathieu Fonteyn (born 1985), Belgian swimmer
- Sam Fonteyn (1925–1991), English composer and pianist

== See also ==
- Fonteyn (crater), a crater on Mercury

Fonteyn artist name of Suzanne May: ( MUSIC ) vocalist, composer, producer .
