= Listing Rules =

UK regulations for companies listed on a UK stock exchange

The UK Listing Rules (UKLR) are a set of regulations applicable to any company listed on a United Kingdom stock exchange, subject to the oversight of the Financial Conduct Authority (FCA). The UK Listing Rules set out mandatory standards for any company wishing to list its shares or securities for sale to the public, including principles on executive pay and the requirement to comply or explain noncompliance with the UK Corporate Governance Code, the requirements of information in a prospectus before an initial public offering of shares, new share offers, rights issues, disclosure of price sensitive information, or takeover bids for companies.

== History ==
The London Stock Exchange has had a long tradition of self-regulation. Previous versions of the same kinds of rules were known as the rules on "Admission of Securities to Quotations" or "Admission of Securities to Listing".

By 2011, the former UK Listing Authority was part of the government-appointed Financial Services Authority. After the FSA's abolition in 2013, it became part of the newly formed Financial Conduct Authority, and since 2017 reference to the UKLA as a separate body has been phased out.

In July 2024, the Listing Rules were overhauled and simplified, the biggest change in over 30 years.

== List of Rules ==
- UKLR 1, Preliminary: all securities
- UKLR 2, Listing Principles
- UKLR 3, Requirements for listing: all securities
- UKLR 4, Sponsors: responsibilities of issuers
- UKLR 5, Equity shares (commercial companies): requirements for admission to listing
- UKLR 6, Equity shares (commercial companies): continuing obligations
- UKLR 7, Equity shares (commercial companies): significant transactions and reverse takeovers
- UKLR 8, Equity shares (commercial companies): related party transactions
- UKLR 9, Equity shares (commercial companies): further issuances, dealing in own securities and treasury shares
- UKLR 10, Equity shares (commercial companies): contents of circulars
- UKLR 11, Closed-ended investment funds: requirements for listing and continuing obligations
- UKLR 12, Open-ended investment companies: requirements for listing and continuing obligations
- UKLR 13, Equity shares (shell companies): requirements for listing and continuing obligations
- UKLR 14, Equity shares (international commercial companies secondary listing): requirements for listing and continuing obligations
- UKLR 15, Certificates representing certain securities (depositary receipts): requirements for listing and continuing obligations
- UKLR 16, Non-equity shares and non-voting equity shares: requirements for listing and continuing obligations
- UKLR 17, Debt and debt-like securities: continuing obligations
- UKLR 18, Securitised derivatives: requirements for listing and continuing obligations
- UKLR 19, Warrants, options and other miscellaneous securities: continuing obligations
- UKLR 20, Admission to listing: processes and procedures
- UKLR 21, Suspending, cancelling and restoring listing and transfer between listing categories: all securities
- UKLR 22, Equity shares (transition): continuing obligations
- UKLR 23, Listing particulars for professional securities market and certain other securities: all securities
- UKLR 24, Sponsors

In addition, there are 10 transitional provisions.

== See also ==
- UK company law
- London Stock Exchange
- US corporate law
- NYSE Listed Company Manual (here)
