= Specimen charges =

A specimen charge is a type of criminal charge that can be made under the United Kingdom's legal system. It can be made when an individual is being charged with numerous violations of the same offence. It is used to simplify charging the person, as they would otherwise have to be charged with each individual offence.

An example of someone being convicted on specimen charges is a 2005 case in England where a man pleaded guilty to specimen charges after he was found to be in possession of 19,000 indecent images of children. Another example is the Denmark Place fire trial, where the culprit, whose act of arson had killed 37 people, was given a specimen charge of the murder of just one of the victims.

Other examples of when specimen charges could be laid include:

- Obtaining social security benefits by deception for a specific sum of money on a specific day, evidence being adduced of a pattern of other such offences.
- Sexual abuse of a child who states they have been abused in the same way on many occasions, but cannot say precisely when or how often.
