= UK Corporate Governance Code =

UK company law

Logo of the Financial Reporting Council

The UK Corporate Governance code, formerly known as the Combined Code (from here on referred to as "the Code") is a part of UK company law with a set of principles of good corporate governance aimed at companies listed on the London Stock Exchange. It is overseen by the Financial Reporting Council and its importance derives from the Financial Conduct Authority's Listing Rules. The Listing Rules themselves are given statutory authority under the Financial Services and Markets Act 2000 and require that public listed companies disclose how they have complied with the code, and explain where they have not applied the code – in what the code refers to as 'comply or explain'. Private companies are also encouraged to conform; however there is no requirement for disclosure of compliance in private company accounts. The Code adopts a principles-based approach in the sense that it provides general guidelines of best practice. This contrasts with a rules-based approach which rigidly defines exact provisions that must be adhered to. In 2017, it was announced that the Financial Reporting Council would amend the Code to require companies to "comply or explain" with a requirement to have elected employee representatives on company boards.

In July 2018, the Financial Reporting Council released the new 2018 UK Corporate Governance Code, which is designed to build on the relationships between companies, shareholders and stakeholders and make them key to long-term sustainable growth of the UK economy.

== Origins ==
The Code is essentially a consolidation and refinement of a number of different reports and codes concerning opinions on good corporate governance. The first step on the road to the initial iteration of the code was the publication of the Cadbury Report in 1992. Produced by a committee chaired by Sir Adrian Cadbury, the Report was a response to major corporate scandals associated with governance failures in the UK. The committee was formed in 1991 after Polly Peck, a major UK company, went insolvent after years of falsifying financial reports. Initially limited to preventing financial fraud, when BCCI and Robert Maxwell scandals took place, Cadbury's remit was expanded to corporate governance generally. Hence the final report covered financial, auditing and corporate governance matters, and made the following three basic recommendations:

- the CEO and chairman of companies should be separated ensuring the absence of CEO duality
- boards should have at least three non-executive directors, two of whom should have no financial or personal ties to executives
- each board should have an audit committee composed of non-executive directors

These recommendations were initially highly controversial, although they did no more than reflect the contemporary "best practice", and urged that these practices be spread across listed companies. At the same time it was emphasised by Cadbury that there was no such thing as "one size fits all". In 1994, the principles were appended to the Listing Rules of the London Stock Exchange, and it was stipulated that companies need not comply with the principles, but had to explain to the stock market why not if they did not.

Before long, a further committee chaired by chairman of Marks & Spencer Sir Richard Greenbury was set up as a 'study group' on executive compensation. It responded to public anger, and some vague statements by the Prime Minister John Major that regulation might be necessary, over spiralling executive pay, particularly in public utilities that had been privatised. In July 1995 the Greenbury Report was published. This recommended some further changes to the existing principles in the Cadbury Code:

- each board should have a remuneration committee composed without executive directors, but possibly the chairman
- directors should have long term performance related pay, which should be disclosed in the company accounts and contracts renewable each year

Greenbury recommended that progress be reviewed every three years and so in 1998 Sir Ronald Hampel, who was chairman and managing director of ICI plc, chaired a third committee. The ensuing Hampel Report suggested that all the Cadbury and Greenbury principles be consolidated into a "Combined Code". It added that,

- the Chairman of the board should be seen as the "leader" of the non-executive directors
- institutional investors should consider voting the shares they held at meetings, though rejected compulsory voting
- all kinds of remuneration including pensions should be disclosed.

It rejected the idea that had been touted that the UK should follow the German two-tier board structure, or reforms in the EU Draft Fifth Directive on Company Law. A further mini-report was produced the following year by the Turnbull Committee which recommended directors be responsible for internal financial and auditing controls. A number of other reports were issued through the next decade, particularly including the Higgs review, from Derek Higgs focusing on what non-executive directors should do, and responding to the problems thrown up by the collapse of Enron in the US. Paul Myners also completed two major reviews of the role of institutional investors for the Treasury, whose principles were also found in the Combined Code. Shortly following the collapse of Northern Rock and the Financial Crisis, the Walker Review produced a report focused on the banking industry, but also with recommendations for all companies. In 2010, a new Stewardship Code was issued by the Financial Reporting Council, along with a new version of the UK Corporate Governance Code, hence separating the issues from one another.

== Contents ==
=== Section A: Leadership ===
Every company should be headed by an effective board which is collectively responsible for the long-term success of the company.

There should be a clear division of responsibilities at the head of the company between the running of the board and the executive responsibility for the running of the company's business. No one individual should have unfettered powers of decision.

The chairman is responsible for leadership of the board and ensuring its effectiveness on all aspects of its role.

As part of their role as members of a unitary board, non-executive directors should constructively challenge and help develop proposals on strategy.

=== Section B: Effectiveness ===
The board and its committees should have the appropriate balance of skills, experience, independence and knowledge of the company to enable them to discharge their respective duties and responsibilities effectively.

There should be a formal, rigorous and transparent procedure for the appointment of new directors to the board.

All directors should be able to allocate sufficient time to the company to discharge their responsibilities All directors should receive induction on joining the board and should regularly update and refresh their skills and knowledge.

The board should be supplied in a timely manner with information in a form and of a quality appropriate to enable it to discharge its duties.

The board should undertake a formal and rigorous annual evaluation of its own performance and that of its committees and individual directors.

All directors should be submitted for re-election at regular intervals, subject to continued satisfactory performance.

=== Section C: Accountability ===
The board should present a balanced and understandable assessment of the company's position and prospects.

The board is responsible for determining the nature and extent of the significant risks it is willing to take in achieving its strategic objectives. The board should maintain sound risk management and internal control systems.

The board should establish formal and transparent arrangements for considering how they should apply the corporate reporting and risk management and internal control principles and for maintaining an appropriate relationship with the company's auditor.

=== Section D: Remuneration ===
Levels of remuneration should be sufficient to attract, retain and motivate directors of the quality required to run the company successfully, but a company should avoid paying more than is necessary for this purpose. A significant proportion of executive directors’ remuneration should be structured so as to link rewards to corporate and individual performance.

There should be a formal and transparent procedure for developing policy on executive remuneration and for fixing the remuneration packages of individual directors. No director should be involved in deciding his or her own remuneration.

=== Section E: Relations with Shareholders ===
There should be a dialogue with shareholders based on the mutual understanding of objectives. The board as a whole has responsibility for ensuring that a satisfactory dialogue with shareholders takes place.

The board should use the AGM to communicate with investors and to encourage their participation.

=== Schedules ===
Schedule A
The design of performance-related remuneration for executive directors

This goes into more detail about the problem of director pay.

Schedule B
Disclosure of corporate governance arrangements

This sets out a checklist of which duties must be complied with (or explained) under Listing Rule 9.8.6. It makes clear what obligations there are, and that everything should be posted on the company's website.

== Compliance ==
In its 2007 response to a Financial Reporting Council consultation paper in July 2007 Pensions & Investment Research Consultants Ltd (a commercial proxy advisory service) reported that only 33% of listed companies were fully compliant with all of the Code's provisions. Spread over all the rules, this is not necessarily a poor response, and indications are that compliance has been climbing. PIRC maintains that poor compliance correlates to poor business performance, and at any rate a key provision such as separating the CEO from the Chair had an 88.4% compliance rate.

The question thrown up by the Code's approach is the tension between wanting to maintain "flexibility" and achieve consistency. The tension is between an aversion to "one size fits all" solutions, which may not be right for everyone, and practices which are in general agreement to be tried, tested and successful. If companies find that non-compliance works for them, and shareholders agree, they will not be punished by an exodus of investors. So the chief method for accountability is meant to be through the market, rather than through law.

An additional reason for a Code, was the original concern of the Cadbury Report, that companies faced with minimum standards in law would comply merely with the letter and not the spirit of the rules.

The Financial Services Authority has recently proposed to abandon a requirement to state compliance with the principles (under LR 9.8.6(5)), rather than the rules in detail themselves.

== See also ==
- Corporate Governance
- Corporate Social Responsibility
- Stewardship Code
- Worker representation on corporate boards of directors
- UK company law
- UK labour law

Company reform reports

- Greene Committee (1926) Report of the Company Law Amendment Committee (Cmnd 2657, 1926)
- Cohen Committee (1945)
- Jenkins Committee (1962)
- Alan Bullock (1977) Report of the committee of inquiry on industrial democracy, on worker codetermination
- Cork Report, Insolvency Law and Practice, Report of the Review Committee (1982) (Cmnd 8558)
- Cadbury Report (1992), Financial Aspects of Corporate Governance, on corporate governance generally. Pdf file here
- Greenbury Report (1995) Directors' Remuneration, Report of the Study Group Pdf here
- Hampel Report (1998), Review of corporate governance since Cadbury, here and online with the EGCI here
- Turnbull Report (1999) on internal controls to ensure good financial reporting
- Myners Report (2001), Institutional Investment in the United Kingdom: A Review on institutional investors, Pdf file here and Review of Progress Report here
- Higgs Report (2003) Review of the role and effectiveness of non-executive directors. Pdf here
- Smith Report (2003) on auditors. Pdf here
