= Greenbury Report =

The Greenbury Report released in 1995 was the product of a committee established under the auspices of the United Kingdom Confederation of British Industry. The committee was formed at the behest of the President of the Board of Trade, Michael Heseltine, as a result of several scandals in the early 1990s. It followed in the tradition of the Cadbury Report and addressed a growing concern about the level of director remuneration. The modern result of the report is found in the UK Corporate Governance Code at section D.

== Committee Members ==
Sir Richard Greenbury, Chairman & CEO, Marks and Spencers.

Sir David Chapman Partner, Wise Speke Stockbrokers.

Sir Michael Angus, Chairman, Boots/Whitbread.

Sir Denys Henderson, Chairman, Rank Organisation.

Mr Geoff Lindey, JP Morgan.

Mr Tim Melville-Ross, Director general, Institute of Directors.

Mr George Metcalfe Chairman & CEO, UMECO.

Sir David Simon, Chairman, BP.

Sir Iain Vallance, Chairman, BT.

Mr Robert Walther, CEO, Clerical Medical.

Sir David Lees Chairman, GKN.

== See also ==
- UK Corporate Governance Code (2012)
- Cadbury Report (1992)
- Hampel Report (1998)
- Turnbull Report
- Higgs Report (2003)
- Smith Report (2003)
