= Review of the role and effectiveness of non-executive directors =

Review of the role and effectiveness of non-executive directors (or the "Higgs review") was a report chaired by Derek Higgs on corporate governance commissioned by the UK government, published on 20 January 2003. It reviewed the role and effectiveness of non-executive directors and of the audit committee, aiming at improving and strengthening the existing Combined Code.

There was widespread unrest after the scandals in the US, involving Enron, WorldCom, and Tyco. The US opted for legislation under the Sarbanes–Oxley Act.

Higgs strongly backed the existing non-prescriptive approach to corporate governance: "comply or explain". Yet he advocated more provisions with more stringent criteria for the board composition and evaluation of independent directors. He wanted to remove some of the discretion that the Code allowed.

Higgs viewed the earlier scandals, which led to the Cadbury Report could have been avoided had a Code been in place. The Robert Maxwell debacle could have been avoided in his view because many firms already refused to deal with him, and disclosure of his company's governance practices would have led to more pressure for change.

In December 2009, the Financial Reporting Council commissioned the Institute of Chartered Secretaries and Administrators to update the Higgs guidance with the assistance of a Steering Group. In July 2010, ICSA launched draft guidance ['Improving board effectiveness'] as part of this process. The Financial Reporting Council published the final guidance in March 2011, and it is available here: http://www.frc.org.uk/getattachment/c9ce2814-2806-4bca-a179-e390ecbed841/Guidance-on-Board-Effectiveness.aspx

== See also ==
- Combined Code
- Cadbury Report (1992)
- Greenbury Report (1995)
- Hampel Report (1998)
- Turnbull Report (1999)
- Smith Report (2003)
