= Hampel Report =

The Hampel Report (January 1998) was designed to be a revision of the corporate governance system in the UK. The remit of the committee was to review the Code laid down by the Cadbury Report (now found in the Combined Code). It asked whether the code's original purpose was being achieved. Hampel found that there was no need for a revolution in the UK corporate governance system. The Report aimed to combine, harmonise and clarify the Cadbury and Greenbury recommendations.

On the question of in whose interests companies should be run, its answer came with clarity.

The single overriding objective shared by all listed companies, whatever their size or type of business is the preservation and the greatest practical enhancement over time of their shareholders' investment.

The Hampel Report relied more on broad principles and a 'common sense' approach which was necessary to apply to different situations rather than Cadbury and Greenbury's 'box-ticking' approach.

== See also ==
- Combined Code
- Cadbury Report (1992)
- Greenbury Report (1995)
- Turnbull Report
- Higgs Report (2003)
- Smith Report (2003)
