= Cadbury Report =

British report on corporate governance

The Cadbury Report, titled Financial Aspects of Corporate Governance, is a report issued by "The Committee on the Financial Aspects of Corporate Governance" chaired by Sir Adrian Cadbury, chairman of Cadbury, that sets out recommendations on the arrangement of company boards and accounting systems to mitigate corporate governance risks and failures.

In 1991 the London Stock Exchange set up the Cadbury committee and the report was published in draft version in May 1992. Its revised and final version was issued in December of the same year. The report's recommendations have been used to varying degrees to establish other codes such as those of the OECD, the European Union, the United States, the World Bank etc.

== Background ==
Sridhar Arcot and Valentina Bruno in their article called "In Letter but not in Spirit: An Analysis of Corporate Governance in the UK" explain the background to the Cadbury Committee. Although wrong on the historical facts, as Robert Maxwell died on 5 November 1991 and "The Committee on the Financial Aspects of Corporate Governance" known as "The Cadbury Committee" was set up in May 1991 for other reasons than the Maxwell case, it gives an interesting reading of the situation at the time:

Robert Maxwell's death while cruising on the Canary Islands in 1990 shone a spotlight on his company's affairs. A series of risky acquisitions in the mid-eighties had led Maxwell Communications into high debts, which was being financed by diverting resources from the pension funds of his companies. After his disappearance, it emerged that the Mirror Group's debts (one of Maxwell's companies) vastly outweighed its assets, while £440 millions (GBP) were missing from the company's pension funds. Despite the suspicion of manipulation of the pension schemes, there was a widespread feeling in the City of London that no action was taken by UK or US regulators against the Maxwell Communications Corp. Eventually, in 1992 Maxwell's companies filed for bankruptcy protection in the UK and US. At around the same time the Bank of Credit and Commerce International (BCCI) went bust and lost billions of dollars for its depositors, shareholders and employees. Another company, Polly Peck, reported healthy profits one year while declaring bankruptcy the next. Following the raft of governance failures, Sir Adrian Cadbury chaired a committee whose aims were to investigate the British corporate governance system and to suggest improvements to restore investor confidence in the system. The Committee was set up in May 1991 by the Financial Reporting Council, the London Stock Exchange, and the accountancy profession. The report embodied recommendations based on practical experiences and with an eye on the US experience, further elaborated after a process of consultation and widely accepted. The final report was released in December 1992 and then applied to listed companies reporting their accounts after 30th June 1993.

== History lesson: Cadbury 1992 ==
Lessons from the report according to The National Computing Centre, 2010:

- Financial Aspects of Corporate Governance
- Division of top responsibilities:
  - No one individual has powers of decision
  - Majority of independent non-executive directors
  - At least three non-executives on the audit committee (oversee accounting/financial reporting)
  - Majority of non-executives on the remuneration committee
  - Non-executives to be selected by the whole board

== See also ==
- Corporate governance
- Hampel Report (1998)
- Turnbull Report (1999)
- Higgs Report (2003)
- Smith Report (2003)
- King Report on Corporate Governance
- UK Corporate Governance Code
- Treadway Commission in the United States
