= Financial Reporting Council =

Regulator responsible for promoting high quality corporate governance

Logo of the Financial Reporting Council

The Financial Reporting Council (FRC) is an independent regulator in the UK and Ireland based in London Wall in the City of London, responsible for regulating auditors, accountants and actuaries, and setting the UK's Corporate Governance and Stewardship Codes. The FRC seeks to promote transparency and integrity in business by aiming its work at investors and others who rely on company reports, audits and high-quality risk management.

In December 2018, an independent review of the FRC, led by Sir John Kingman, recommended its replacement by a new Audit, Reporting and Governance Authority, a recommendation that the government agreed to follow in March 2019 but later delayed.

Ireland adopted the FRC's auditing framework in 2017.

== Structure ==
The FRC is a company limited by guarantee, and is funded by the audit profession, who are required to contribute under the provisions of the Companies Act 2006 and by other groups subject to, or benefitting from FRC regulation. Its board of directors is appointed by the Secretary of State for Business & Trade. It and its subsidiaries play crucial roles in the oversight and development of corporate governance standards in the UK and the Republic of Ireland, such as the UK Corporate Governance Code and standards for the accounting industry.

The FRC board is supported by three governance committees, two business committees, and three advisory councils.

=== Governance committees ===
- Audit Committee
- Nominations Committee
- Remuneration Committee

=== Business committees ===
- Codes & Standards Committee - advises the FRC board on corporate governance matters, including changes to the UK Corporate Governance Code and the Stewardship Code. It also advises the FRC Board on the Annual Plan and Budget and FRC strategy.
- Conduct Committee - responsible for overseeing the FRC's work in promoting high quality corporate reporting. Its responsibilities include overseeing: the monitoring of recognised Supervisory and Recognised Qualifying Bodies; audit quality reviews; Corporate reporting reviews; Professional discipline; and the regulation of accountants and actuaries. The Conduct Committee is supported by three further Committees, members of whom, including the Chairs, sit on the Conduct Committee:
  - the Case Management Committee, whose functions include monitoring and providing oversight in respect of enforcement investigations and tribunal proceedings;
  - the Audit Quality Review Committee; and
  - the Corporate Reporting Review Committee, which ensures the consistency and quality of the FRC's monitoring work.

=== Advisory councils ===
- Corporate Reporting - advises the FRC Executive on the development and maintenance of high quality, effective and proportionate Standards, Guidance, SORPS and Practice Notes for accounting and narrative reporting work. Accounting standards apply to all companies, and other entities that prepare accounts that are intended to provide a true and fair view.
- Audit & Assurance - as above, but for audit and assurance work.
- Actuarial - as above, but for technical actuarial work.

== Former structure ==
The FRC used to incorporate six operating bodies:

=== Accounting Standards Board ===
The role of the Accounting Standards Board (ASB) was to issue accounting standards in the United Kingdom and was recognised for that purpose under the Companies Act 1985. It took over the task of setting accounting standards from the Accounting Standards Committee (ASC) in 1990. However, ASB was overtaken by the Financial Reporting Council (FRC) on 2 July 2012. Thus, FRC is now the authority that may issue accounting standards in the UK.

=== Financial Reporting Review Panel ===
The Financial Reporting Review Panel (FRRP) was established in 1990 as a subsidiary of the United Kingdom's Financial Reporting Council. The FRRP sought to ensure that the provision of financial information by public and large private companies complied with relevant accounting requirements such as the Companies Act 1985.

=== Accountancy & Actuarial Discipline Board ===
The Accountancy & Actuarial Discipline Board (AADB) was the independent, investigative and disciplinary body for accountants and actuaries in the United Kingdom. The AADB was formerly known as the Accountancy Investigation & Discipline Board (AIDB) and changed its name to the AADB on 16 August 2007. The AADB Scheme established the framework and set in place the legal formalities of participation between the AADB and the Participating Accountancy Bodies i.e. the Institute of Chartered Accountants in England and Wales (ICAEW), the Association of Chartered Certified Accountants (ACCA), the Chartered Institute of Management Accountants (CIMA), and the Chartered Institute of Public Finance and Accountancy (CIPFA), The Institute of Chartered Accountants of Ireland, and the Institute of Chartered Accountants of Scotland.

As of 2010 the AADB had a substantial workload including investigations into the conduct of professional firms, such as EY, that had advised Lehman Brothers, JPMorgan, Connaught, Aero Inventory, and BAE Systems.

=== Professional Oversight Board ===
The Professional Oversight Board (POB) was a regulatory body specialising in the accounting, auditing, and actuarial professions in the United Kingdom. It was a part of the Financial Reporting Council (FRC), the independent regulator of corporate governance and reporting in the UK.

The Board's stated purpose was to support the FRC's goal of investor and public confidence in the financial governance of business organisations. The Board provides assurance that professional accountancy bodies are properly setting standards and enforcing discipline for their members, in accordance with the Companies Act 2006 and other statutory requirements. The POB carried out inspections on behalf of the FRC, but if any shortcomings were found, sanctions could only be imposed by the professional bodies. The POB did not have the power either to overturn any decision which the body has made in a case or to direct how the body should handle a case.

The Board also operated an Audit Inspection Unit (AIU) that oversees auditing organisations and makes recommendations for appropriate regulatory actions by governmental and professional authorities. As part of its oversight of the actuarial profession, the Board monitored the activities of actuarial organisations with regard to the education, discipline, ethical standards and continuing professional development of their members. The Board also sought to provide a framework for the evaluation of the quality and effectiveness of actuarial work.

Before 5 May 2006, the Board was known as the Professional Oversight Board for Accountancy. The name change reflected the Board's additional responsibility for oversight of the actuarial profession from that date.

In 2011, the Board published information for the first time about shortcomings in self-regulation by particular institutes. Press reports highlighted comments about ACCA, which had implemented recommendations to improve its examination syllabus, but needed to pay greater attention to continuing monitoring of members who had registered as auditors some years ago. The board contains member from a wide range of background. As of 2011 Paul George is its director, and John kellas is interim chair following the death of Dame Barbara Mills.

=== Auditing Practices Board ===
The Auditing Practices Board Limited (APB) was originally established in 1991 as a committee of the Consultative Committee of Accountancy Bodies, to take responsibility within both Ireland and the United Kingdom for setting standards of auditing, with the objective of enhancing public confidence in the audit process and the quality and relevance of audit services in the public interest.

In April 2002 APB was re-established under the auspices of The Accountancy Foundation and, following a UK government review, it was transferred to the FRC. Its objective remained the same, but its remit was extended to include responsibility for setting standards for auditors' integrity, objectivity and independence.

An APB electronic newsletter was published periodically to "assist interested parties [to] better understand APB activities".

=== Board for Actuarial Standards ===
Following the Morris Review of the Actuarial Profession, published in March 2005, HM Treasury asked the Financial Reporting Council (FRC) to take on responsibility for oversight of the regulation of actuaries by the Institute and Faculty of Actuaries (IFoA) and the independent setting of technical actuarial standards. This latter task was the remit of the Board for Actuarial Standards until 2 July 2012 when responsibility was assumed by the FRC.

== Senior personnel ==
Sir Winfried Bischoff was the Chairman of the FRC, between 2014 and 2019. Other board members included Gay Huey Evans, Melanie McLaren and Paul George. The FRC's chief executive from November 2009 until announcing he was stepping down in late 2018, was Stephen Haddrill.

In 2019, Simon Dingemans and Sir Jon Thompson took over as chair and CEO respectively. Private Eye reported that during the appointment process, Simon Dingemans did not declare an interest in a company which was late filing accounts. In May 2020, Dingemans resigned, citing conflicts between the part-time role and other positions he was interested in taking. In December 2021, Jan du Plessis was nominated by the UK Government to lead the FRC through its transformation into the Audit, Reporting and Governance Authority. In February 2022, du Plessis was confirmed as the FRC's new chair.

== Controversies ==
=== Carillion ===
Following the January 2018 collapse of construction and services business Carillion, it was reported that Carillion's auditor KPMG would have its role examined by the FRC. Two months later, the FRC's conduct committee announced an investigation into the conduct of former Carillion finance directors Richard Adam and Zafar Khan.

The operations of the FRC itself were also to be scrutinised by an independent inquiry ordered by Business Secretary Greg Clark.

An "excoriating" report by the Business and the Work and Pensions Select Committees into the collapse of Carillion, published on 16 May 2018, was critical of the FRC, describing it as feeble and timid, and of failing to follow up concerns in Carillion's 2015 accounts. Along with The Pensions Regulator, it was branded as "chronically passive". Welcoming the Government's review of the FRC's powers and effectiveness, the report said changes to be a more aggressive and proactive regulator "will require a significant shift in culture at the FRC itself". Still under pressure to improve, in October 2018, the FRC proposed reforms, including banning from earning consultancy fees at businesses they audit, to tackle the "underlying falling trust in business and the effectiveness of audit," and severely rebuked KPMG. In July 2020, the FRC told the Big Four that they must submit plans by October 2020 to separate their audit and consultancy operations by 2024.

Meanwhile, in November 2018, it was announced that Stephen Haddrill, CEO of the FRC, was to quit, amid suggestions that his departure might lead to the body's abolition.

== FRC replacement ==
In March 2019, the government announced that the FRC would be replaced by a new regulator, the Audit, Reporting and Governance Authority (ARGA), with enhanced powers, in an effort to "change the culture" of the accounting sector. Plans for the new regulator were included in the September 2019 Queen's Speech and, despite concerns that the launch of ARGA might be delayed, the Department for Business, Enterprise and Industrial Strategy (BEIS) told Accountancy Daily in February 2020 that "next steps on audit reform" would be taken in the first quarter of 2020. However, further details were slow to emerge; in November 2020 City A.M. reported that reform proposals relating to the audit sector were expected in early 2021 with full implementation expected in 2023.

A UK Government policy paper, Restoring trust in audit and corporate governance, was published on 19 March 2021, consulting on its proposed steps to establish the ARGA and give it the formal duties, functions and powers it needs to be fully effective. In September 2021, the FRC's head of regulatory standards, Mark Babington said the ARGA would "commence in April 2023". In the King's Speech in November 2023, there was no mention of a bill however, following the change of government in July 2024, a draft Audit Reform and Corporate Governance Bill has been proposed.

== See also ==
- UK company law
- UK Corporate Governance Code
- Stewardship Code
- List of financial supervisory authorities by country
