= Albert A. Ultcht =

Mayor of Melbourne, Florida from 1922 to 1924

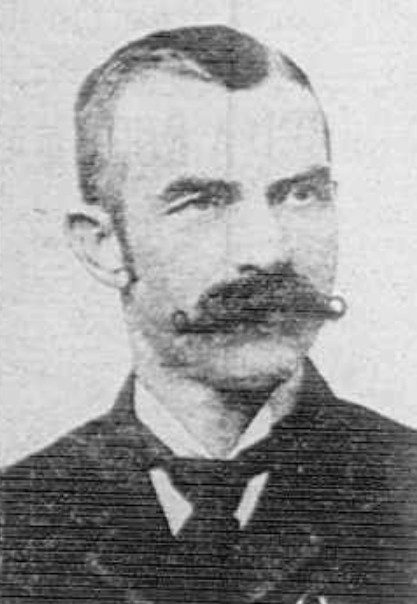

24th Mayor of Melbourne, Florida
- In office December 8, 1922 – December 2, 1924
- Preceded by: E. G. Argraves
- Succeeded by: Albert Vorkeller

Personal details
- Born: 1859 New York City, US
- Died: 1943 (aged 83–84)
- Party: Democratic
- Spouse: Elizabeth
- Children: William Albert Ultcht, Floyd
- Occupation: automobile sales

Albert A. Ultcht (1859–1943) was a two-term mayor of Melbourne, Florida from 1922 to 1924.

He was the son of August Ultcht.

He was an alderman in Mount Vernon, New York. In his capacity as alderman, he was a successful advocate for the "macadamizing" of public roads.

In 1914, he owned a Studebaker automobile dealership in Mount Vernon. This business was later named Vernon Heights Garage.

As mayor of Melbourne, he recommended to the City Council that they pass an ordinance to regulate the blowing of whistles by the passing railroad. It had been an ongoing source of complaints for many years. He advocated for the creation of a hospital, and contributed his salary and other mayoral fees to create a hospital building fund.

After his term, he was appointed a municipal judge.

In 1932, he and his son Floyd returned to Mount Vernon and reopened the dealership under the name Vernon Park Motors, Inc.

== Associations ==
- Niagara Hose Company Number 1, Mount Vernon
- I.O.O.F., Mount Vernon
- President, West Side Improvement Association, Mount Vernon
- Member, Firemans' Benevolent Association, Mount Vernon

== Legacy ==
- Ultcht Drive in Melbourne is named for him.

Preceded by E. G. Argraves	Mayor of Melbourne, Florida; December 8, 1922–December 2, 1924	Succeeded by Albert Vorkeller
