= Queen Elizabeth's Grammar School, Crediton =

School in Crediton, Devon, England

Coordinates: 50.7919°N 3.6661°W

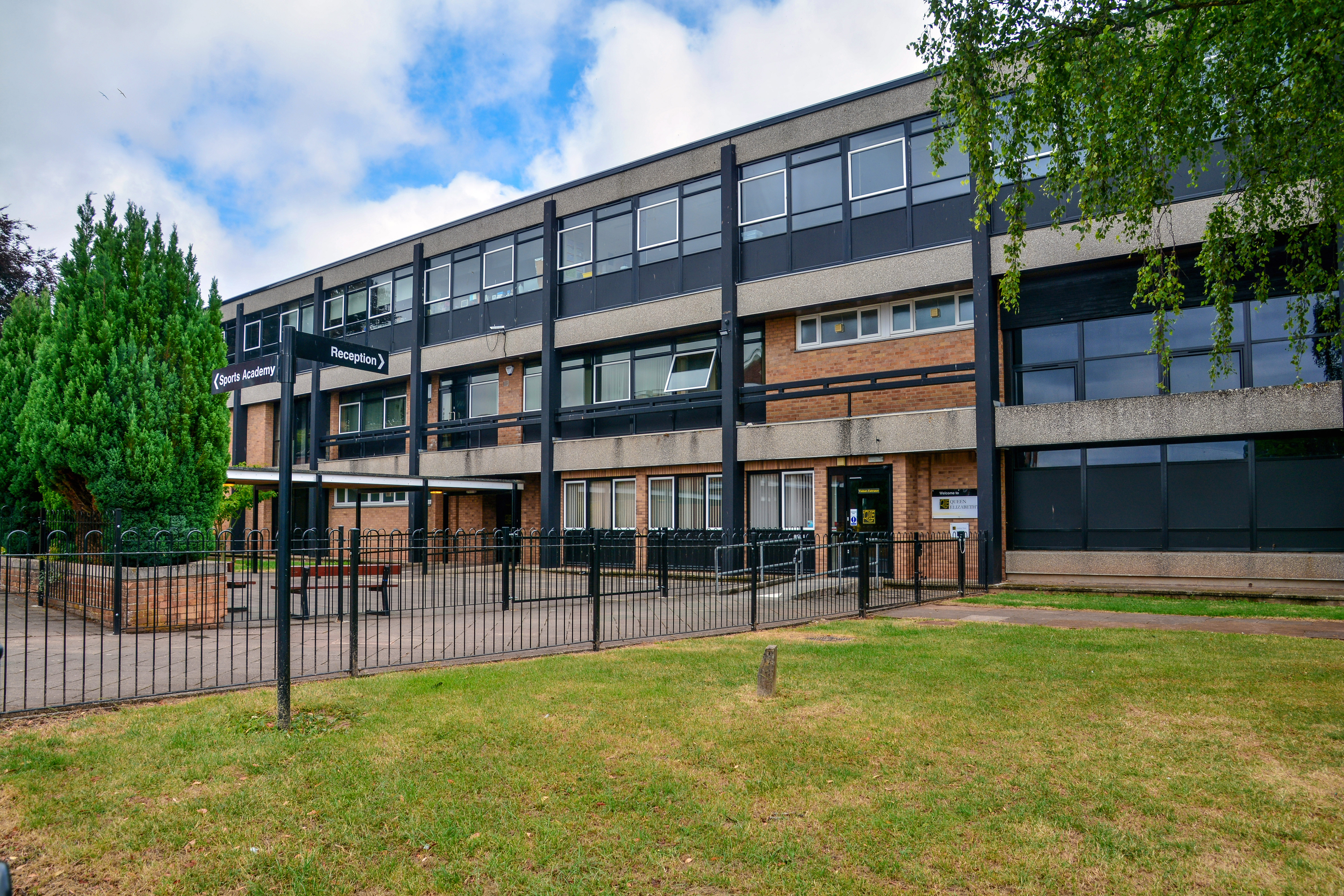
1966 addition to Queen Elizabeth's School, Crediton

The former Queen Elizabeth's Grammar School in Crediton, Devon, England was founded (as The Kyng's Newe Gramer Scole of Credyton) in 1547 by Edward VI and re-endowed and renamed in 1559 by Elizabeth I.

== History ==
=== Foundation ===
In 1547 the grammar school was founded and endowed by Edward VI. In 1559 it was "further endowed by Queen Elizabeth, who by her charter vested the patronage in the twelve governors of the church, directing them to elect four boys, under the name of Queen Elizabeth's Grammar Scholars, to each of whom 40s. are annually given: there are three exhibitions, of £6. 13s 4d each, to either of the universities, tenable for five years. "

Teaching began in 1572 in the Lady Chapel of the parish church with 10 pupils

In 1861 it moved into new premises (at St Martins Lane).

In 1911 it absorbed Dunn's School.

It was noted in Hansard in 1952 as a maintained secondary school which provided boarding.

=== Merger in 1966 ===
In 1966 the boys grammar school (between St Martins Lane and Western Road) incorporated the Crediton High School For Girls (which had been founded in 1911 on the adjoining site to the west). To accommodate the merger, a new multistorey block was built (aligned north-south) on the slope between the former schools.

=== Comprehensive ===
In 1973 it merged with The Shelley Secondary Modern school at Barnfield, Crediton. It now forms the Western Road campus (the upper school) of the Queen Elizabeth's School, which is a state run academy. The lower and upper schools are split across two sites in Crediton.

== Notable former pupils ==
- John Griffith Bowen, novelist
- Henry Callaway, missionary
- Bill Giles, former BBC weatherman
- Sir Neville Simms, chief executive of Tarmac from 1992 to 1999
- Robert Orchard, BBC parliamentary correspondent. QES 1964–72
- Major Rupert Guy Turrall, Intelligence Corps recipient of MC and DSO in WWII, operations officer with the Chindits

== School records ==
Some of the school records were transferred to the Devon Record Office in 2006.

Copies of the 1547 and 1559 charters are held at the Devon Record Office (ref 2065M/SS6/4).
