= Photo-Auto Guide =

Early automobile route guides published by Rand McNally

Photo-Auto Guides
- Author: G. S. Chapin; Rand McNally & Company
- Language: English
- Subject: Automobile travel and road navigation
- Genre: Route guide
- Publisher: G. S. Chapin; Rand McNally & Company
- Publication date: c. 1905–1909
- Publication place: United States

The Photo-Auto Guides were a series of early automobile route guides published in the United States during the first decade of the 20th century. They predated the United States Numbered Highway System and were intended to help motorists navigate a road network largely maintained by state and local authorities.

The guides combined photographs, hand-drawn maps, written directions, mileage tables, and descriptions of landmarks to help motorists follow specific routes between cities. G. S. Chapin began publishing the guides around 1905. Rand McNally acquired the publishing rights in 1907 and expanded the series during the following years.

Andrew McNally II personally photographed the Chicago to Milwaukee route, in both directions, traveling with his new wife, Eleanor, on their honeymoon in June 1908. Using a large-format camera, he photographed what he considered “puzzling intersections,” and the photographs were later incorporated into the guide.

The guides appeared when automobile travel was still new and many roads were unpaved, poorly marked, and subject to changes in condition. Rather than relying on standardized route numbers and signs, they documented individual routes with photographs and detailed directions, allowing motorists to identify intersections and landmarks along the way.

== History ==
The original Photo-Auto Guides were published by Chicago-based G. S. Chapin around 1905. In 1907, Rand McNally purchased Chapin's rights and acquired rights to the “Photographic Automobile Maps” developed by Sargent Michaels, which similarly documented routes in the Midwest.

Surviving volumes cover routes centered on major cities in the Midwest and Northeast, including Chicago–Buffalo, Chicago–South Bend, and Buffalo–Albany.

The guides were more than general road maps. They combined photographs, hand-drawn maps, turn-by-turn directions, distance charts, indexes, spaces for notes, and advertisements. Railroad crossings, bridges, schools, and other landmarks were identified to help motorists recognize where to turn. Some guides also distinguished between routes suitable for wet and dry weather, reflecting the variable condition of early roads.

== Purpose ==
The Photo-Auto Guides provided route-specific navigation at a time before standardized names, numbers, or signs. A road could be a dirt or gravel track with several possible routes at an unmarked crossroads. The guides addressed this problem through visual information. Photographs showed intersections and landmarks, arrows indicated directions, and mileage information helped motorists anticipate turns.

Rather than requiring the driver to interpret a general map and select a route, the guide provided a sequence of observations and instructions for a particular journey. This was especially useful when rain could alter road conditions or when an unmarked intersection was difficult for a visitor to identify.

== History ==
Before the United States Numbered Highway System, long-distance automobile routes were often identified by names. Organizations promoted routes such as the Lincoln Highway, Dixie Highway, Jefferson Highway, and other named trails. Trail organizations promoted their routes, advocated road improvements, and sometimes marked routes with signs or painted insignia.

Named trails helped identify long-distance routes but did not form a single nationwide system. Routes could overlap or change and could consist of roads maintained by different authorities. The proliferation of named trails was among the problems addressed by the creation of a national system of route numbers.

Rand McNally later became involved in numbered-road mapping. The company's history identifies cartographer John Brink with a numbered-road system first published on a 1917 map of Peoria, Illinois. The system was later adopted in modified form by highway authorities.

Andrew McNally II personally photographed the Chicago to Milwaukee route, in both directions, traveling with his new wife, Eleanor, on their honeymoon in June 1908. Using a large-format camera, he photographed what he considered “puzzling intersections,” and the photographs were later incorporated into the guide.

The Photo-Auto Guides were published for less than a decade. They continued to improve information available to drivers alongside improvements in roads, highway administration, and route marking. The Federal Aid Road Act of 1916's establishment of the federal-aid framework for road improvements along with the U.S. Numbered Highway System introduced standardized route numbers in 1926. reduced many of the problems that had made photographic route guides useful. Increasingly well defined numbered highways developed made conventional maps and road atlases more useful to motorists than Photo-Auto Guides' sequence of individually documented turns.

== See also ==
- History of road transport
- History of cartography
- Good Roads Movement
- Road map
