= History of road transport =

The history of road transport started with the development of tracks by humans and their beasts of burden.

== Antiquity ==
The first forms of road transport were pack animals carrying goods over tracks that often followed game trails, such as the Natchez Trace. In the Paleolithic Age, humans did not need constructed tracks in open country. The first improved trails would have been at fords, mountain passes and through swamps. The first improvements would have consisted largely of clearing trees and big stones from the path. As commerce increased, the tracks were often flattened or widened to accommodate human and animal traffic. Some of these dirt tracks were developed into fairly extensive networks, allowing communications, trade and governance over wide areas. The Inca Empire in South America and the Iroquois Confederation in North America, neither of which had the wheel, are examples of effective use of such paths.

The first goods transport was on human backs and heads, but the use of pack animals, including donkeys and horses, developed during the Neolithic Age. The first vehicle is believed to have been the travois, a frame used to drag loads, which probably developed in Eurasia after the first use of bullocks (castrated cattle) for pulling plows. In about 5000 BC, sleds developed, which are more difficult to build than travois but are easier to propel over smooth surfaces. Pack animals, ridden horses, and bullocks dragging travois or sleds require wider paths and higher clearances than people on foot, and improved tracks were required. As a result, by about 5000 BC roads, including the Ridgeway, developed along ridges in England to avoid crossing rivers and bogs. In central Germany, such ridgeways remained the predominant form of the long-distance road till the mid-18th century.

=== Harappan roads ===
Street paving has been found from the first human settlements around 4000 BC in cities of the Indus Valley Civilisation on the Indian subcontinent in modern-day Pakistan, such as Harappa and Mohenjo-Daro. Roads in the towns were straight and long, intersecting one another at right angles.

=== Wheeled transport ===
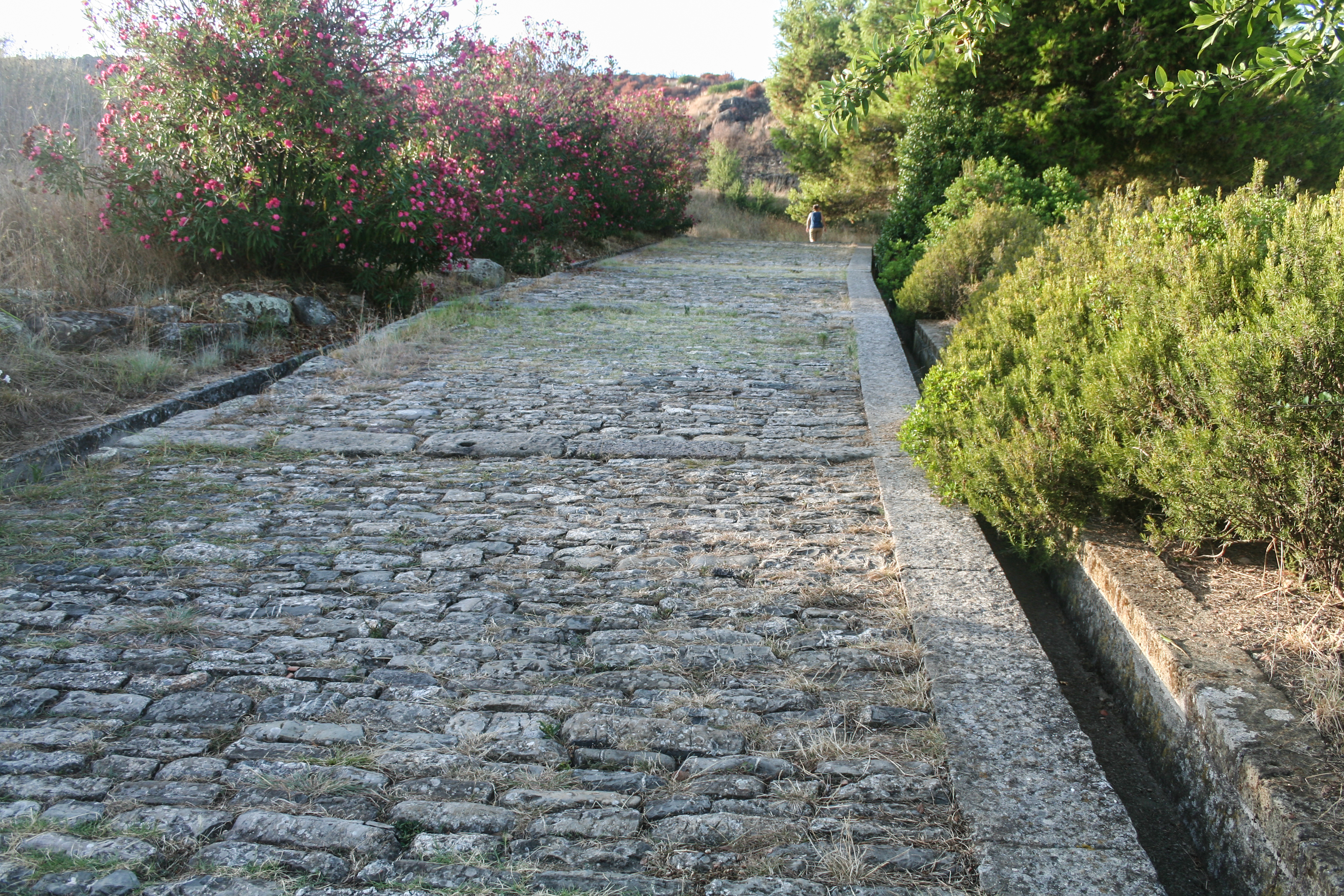
Greek street - 4th or 3rd century BC - The Porta Rosa was the main street of Elea. It connects the northern quarter with the southern quarter. The street is five meters wide and has an incline of 18% in the steepest part. It is paved with limestone blocks and on one side there is a small gutter for drainage.

Wheels appear to have been developed in ancient Sumer in Mesopotamia around 5000 BC, perhaps originally for the making of pottery. Their original transport use may have been as attachments to travois or sleds to reduce resistance. It has been argued that logs were used as rollers under sleds prior to the development of wheels, but there is no archaeological evidence for this. Most early wheels appear to have been attached to fixed axles, which would have required regular lubrication by animal fats or vegetable oils or separation by leather to be effective. The first simple two-wheel carts, apparently developed from travois, appear to have been used in Mesopotamia and northern Iran in about 3000 BC, and two-wheel chariots appeared in about 2800 BC. They were hauled by onagers.

Heavy four-wheeled wagons developed about 2500 BC, which were only suitable for oxen-haulage and therefore were only used where crops were cultivated, particularly Mesopotamia. Two-wheeled chariots with spoked wheels appear to have been developed around 2000 BC by the Andronovo culture in southern Siberia and Central Asia. At much the same time the first primitive harness enabling horse-haulage was invented.

Wheeled transport created the need for better roads. Generally, natural materials cannot be both soft enough to form well-graded surfaces and strong enough to bear wheeled vehicles, especially when wet, and stay intact. In urban areas it began to be worthwhile to build stone-paved streets and, in fact, the first paved streets appear to have been built in Ur in 4000 BC. Corduroy roads (road beds made of logs laid perpendicular to the direction of travel) were built in Glastonbury, England in 3300 BC, and brick-paved roads were built in the Indus Valley Civilisation from around the same time. Improvements in metallurgy meant that by 2000 BC stone-cutting tools were generally available in the Middle East and Greece allowing local streets to be paved. Notably, in about 2000 BC, the Minoans built a 50 km (31 mi) paved road from Knossos in northern Crete through the mountains to Gortyn and Lebena, a port on the south coast of the island, which had side drains, a 200 mm thick pavement of sandstone blocks bound with clay-gypsum mortar, covered by a layer of basaltic flagstones and had separate shoulders. This road could be considered superior to any Roman road.

In 500 BC, Darius the Great started an extensive road system for Persia, including the famous Royal Road which was one of the finest highways of its time. The road was used even after Roman times. Because of the road's superior quality and a system of relays, mounted mail couriers could travel 2,699 kilometres (1,677 mi) in nine days.

From 268 BC to 22 BC, Ashoka built roads, edicts, water wells, education centers, rest houses and hospitals for humans and animals along the highways across Indian subcontinent and planted trees like banyan and mango groves for the benefit of travelers. The Maurya Empire built the Grand Trunk Road which stretched from modern-day Bangladesh to Peshawar in Pakistan. Its length was around 2,000 miles.

=== Roman roads ===
Map of Roman roads in 125 AD

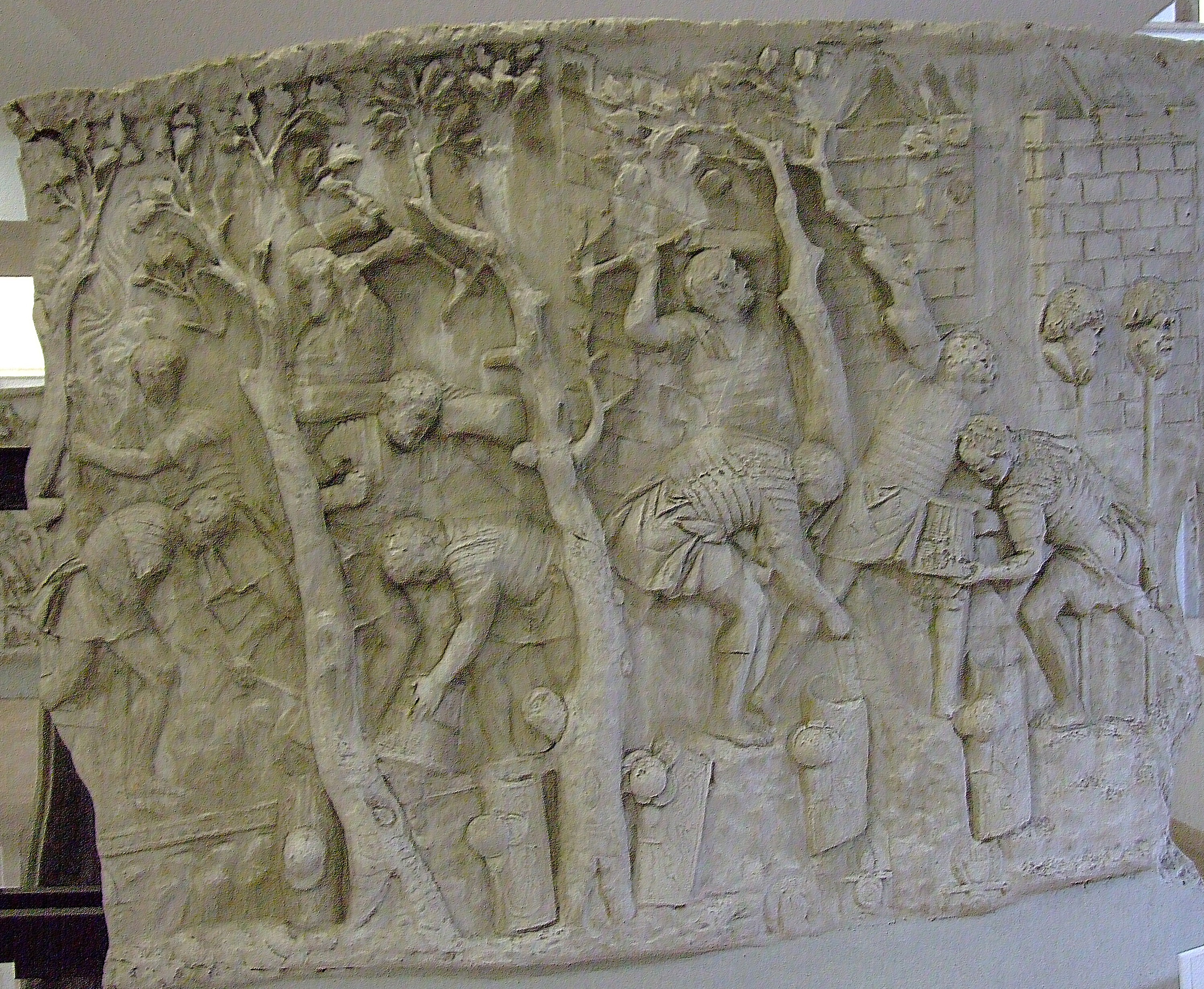
Road construction, depicted on Trajan's Column

With the advent of the Roman Empire, there was a need for armies to be able to travel quickly from one area to another, and the roads that existed were often muddy, which greatly delayed the movement of large masses of troops. To solve this problem, the Romans built great roads. These roads used deep roadbeds of crushed stone as an underlying layer to ensure that they kept dry, as the water would flow out from the crushed stone instead of becoming mud in clay soils. The legions made good time on these roads, and some are still used millennia later.

On the more heavily traveled routes, there were additional layers that included six-sided capstones, or pavers, that reduced the dust and reduced the drag from wheels. The pavers allowed the Roman chariots to travel very quickly, ensuring good communication with the Roman provinces. Farm roads were often paved first on the way into town, to keep produce clean. Early forms of springs and shocks to reduce the bumps were incorporated in horse-drawn transport, as the original pavers were not perfectly aligned.

== Middle Ages ==
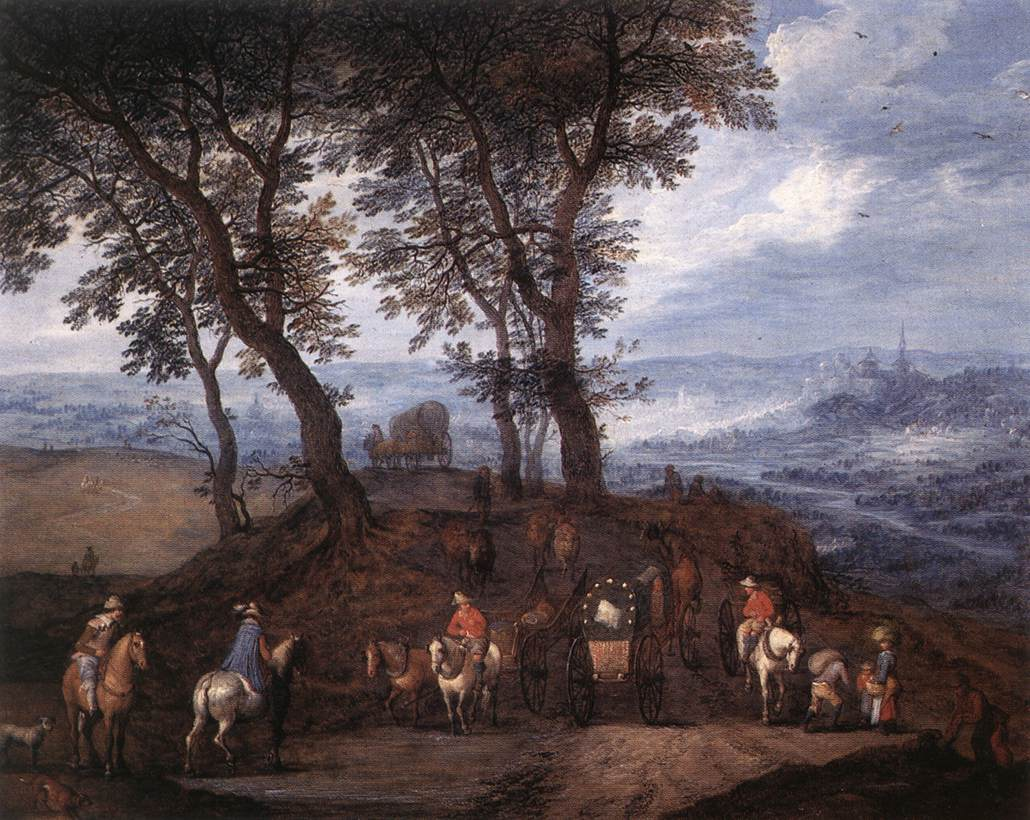
Jan Brueghel (I) - Travellers on the Way, second half of 16th Century

Roman roads deteriorated in medieval Europe because of a lack of resources and skills to maintain them, but many continued to be used. The alignments are still partially used today, for instance, parts of England's A1. Before the 13th century, there were no organized networks of streets inside cities, merely shifting footpaths. With the invention of the horse harness and wagons with swivelled front axles that could make tight turns, urban street networks stabilized.

In the medieval Islamic world, many roads were built throughout the Arab Empire. The most sophisticated roads were those of Baghdad, Iraq, which were paved with tar in the 8th century. Tar was derived from petroleum accessed from oil fields in the region, through the chemical process of destructive distillation.

== Early modern period ==
As states developed and became richer, especially with the Renaissance, new roads and bridges began to be built, often based on Roman designs. Although there were attempts to rediscover Roman methods, there was little useful innovation in road building before the 18th century.

In 18th century West Africa, road transport throughout the Ashanti Empire was maintained via a network of well-kept roads that connected the Ashanti capital with territories within its jurisdiction and influence. After significant road construction undertaken by the kingdom of Dahomey, toll roads were established with the function of collecting yearly taxes based on the goods carried by the people of Dahomey and their occupation. The Royal Road was built in the late 18th century by King Kpengla which stretched from Abomey through Cana up to Ouidah.

Between 1725 and 1737 General George Wade constructed 250 miles (400 km) of road and 40 bridges to improve Britain's control of the Scottish Highlands, using Roman road designs with large stones at the bottom and gravel on top, with a typical overall depth of two metres. They were so poorly aligned and steep, according to Thomas Telford, "as to be unfit for the purposes of civil life" and also rough and poorly drained.

=== Toll roads ===
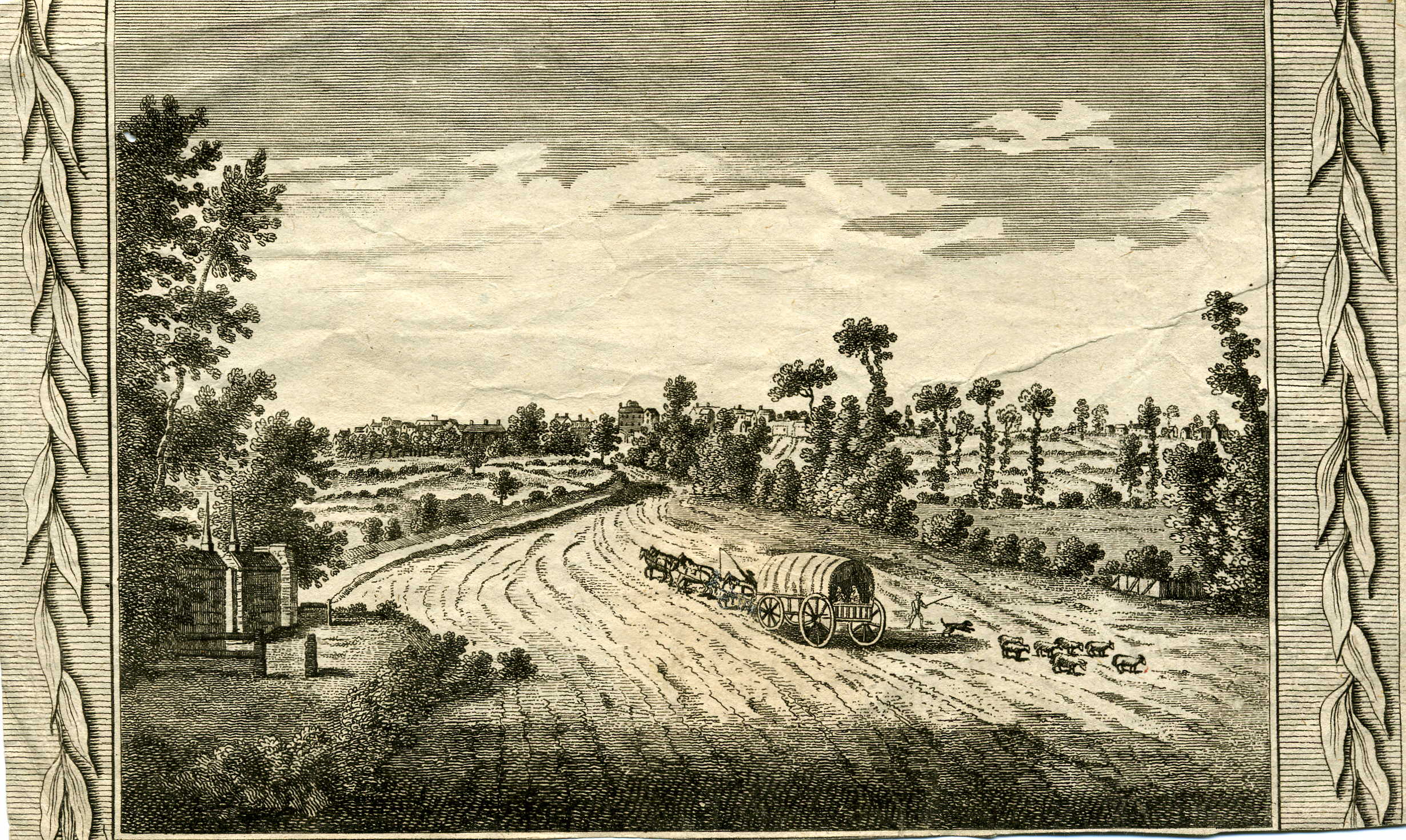
The Great North Road near Highgate on the approach to London before turnpiking. The highway was deeply rutted and spread onto adjoining land.

Responsibility for the state of the roads lay with the local parish since Tudor times. In 1656 the parish of Radwell, Hertfordshire petitioned Parliament for help to maintain their section of the Great North Road Road. Parliament passed an act that gave the local justices powers to erect toll gates on a section of the Great North Road, between Wadesmill, Hertfordshire; Caxton, Cambridgeshire; and Stilton, Huntingdonshire for a period of eleven years, and the revenues so raised should be used for the maintenance of the Great North Road in their jurisdictions. The toll gate erected at Wadesmill became the first effective toll gate in England.

The first scheme that had trustees who were not justices was established through a turnpike act in 1707, for a section of the London–Chester road between Fornhill and Stony Stratford. The basic principle was that the trustees would manage resources from the several parishes through which the highway passed, augment this with tolls from users from outside the parishes, and apply the whole to the maintenance of the main highway. This became the pattern for the turnpiking of a growing number of highways, sought by those who wished to improve flow of commerce through their part of a county.

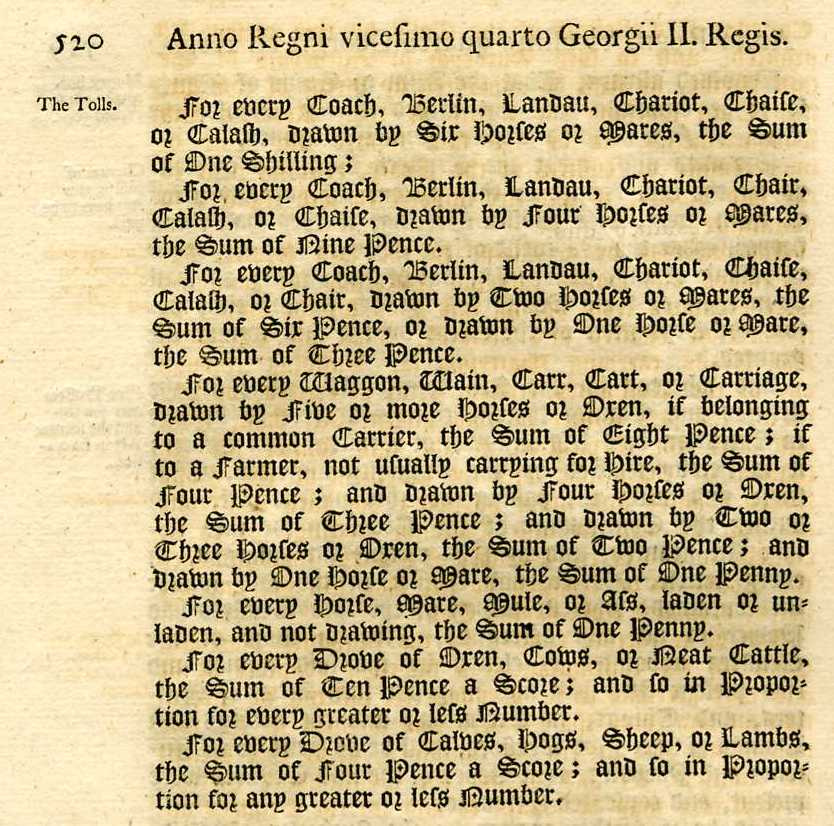
The schedule of maximum tolls allowed on the Woodstock to Rollright Turnpike Trust on the Great Road to Worcester in 1751

In the early 18th century, sections of the main radial roads into London were put under the control of individual turnpike trusts. The pace at which new turnpikes were created picked up in the 1750s as trusts were formed to maintain the cross-routes between the Great Roads radiating from London. Roads leading into some provincial towns, particularly in western England, were put under single trusts, and key roads in Wales were turnpiked. In South Wales, the roads of complete counties were put under single turnpike trusts in the 1760s. A further surge of trust formation occurred in the 1770s, with the turnpiking of subsidiary connecting roads, routes over new bridges, new routes in the growing industrial areas and roads in Scotland. About 150 trusts were established by 1750; by 1772 a further 400 were established and, in 1800, there were over 700 trusts. In 1825 about 1,000 trusts controlled 18,000 miles (29,000 km) of road in England and Wales.

The acts for these new trusts and the renewal acts for the earlier trusts incorporated a growing list of powers and responsibilities. From the 1750s, acts required trusts to erect milestones indicating the distance between the main towns on the road. Users of the road were obliged to follow what were to become rules of the road, such as driving on the left and not damaging the road surface. Trusts could take additional tolls during the summer to pay for watering the road in order to curtail the dust thrown up by vehicles. Parliament also passed a few general turnpike acts dealing with the administration of the trusts and restrictions on the width of wheels—narrow wheels were said to cause a disproportionate amount of damage to the road.

The quality of early turnpike roads varied. Although turnpiking did result in some improvement to each highway, the technologies used to deal with geological features, drainage, and the effects of weather were all in their infancy. Road construction improved slowly, initially through the efforts of individual surveyors such as John Metcalf in Yorkshire in the 1760s. British turnpike builders began to realise the importance of selecting clean stones for surfacing and excluding vegetative material and clay to make better lasting roads.

Turnpikes built in the United States were usually constructed by private companies under a government franchise. They typically paralleled or replaced existing routes with some volume of commerce, hoping the improved road would divert enough traffic to make the enterprise profitable. Plank roads were particularly attractive as they greatly reduced rolling resistance and mitigated the problem of getting mired in mud. Better grading to lessen the steepness of the worst stretches allowed draft animals to haul heavier loads.

== Civil engineering designs ==
=== Metcalf ===
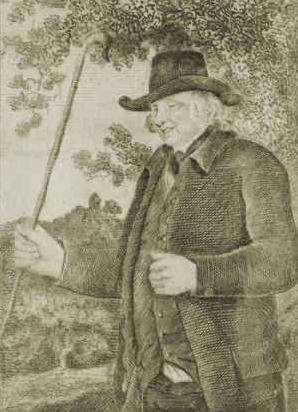
John Metcalf, also known as Blind Jack of Knaresborough. Drawn by J R Smith in The Life of John Metcalf, published 1801.

The first professional road builder to emerge during the Industrial Revolution was John Metcalf, who constructed about 180 miles (290 km) of turnpike road mainly in the north of England, from 1765, when Parliament passed an act authorising the creation of turnpike trusts to build toll funded roads in the Knaresborough area. Metcalf won a contract to build a three-mile (5 km) section of road between Minskip and Ferrensby on a new road from Harrogate to Boroughbridge. He explored the section of the countryside alone and worked out the most practical route.

He believed a good road should have good foundations, be well-drained, and have a smooth convex surface to allow rainwater to drain quickly into ditches at the side. He understood the importance of good drainage, knowing it was precipitation that caused most problems on the roads. He worked out a way to build a road across a bog using a series of rafts made from ling (a type of heather) and furze (gorse) tied in bundles as foundations. This established his reputation as a road builder since other engineers had believed it could not be done. He acquired a mastery of his trade with his own method of calculating costs and materials, which he could not successfully explain to others.

=== Trésaguet ===
Pierre-Marie-Jérôme Trésaguet is widely credited with establishing the first scientific approach to road building in France. He wrote a memorandum on his method in 1775, which became general practice in France. It involved a layer of large rocks covered by a layer of smaller gravel. The lower layer improved on Roman practice in that it was based on the understanding that the purpose of this layer (the sub-base or base course) is to transfer the weight of the road and its traffic to the ground, while protecting the ground from deformation by spreading the weight evenly. Therefore, the sub-base did not have to be a self-supporting structure. The upper running surface provided a smooth surface for vehicles, while protecting the large stones of the sub-base.

Trésaguet understood the importance of drainage by providing deep side ditches, but he insisted on building his roads in trenches so that they could be accessed from the sides, which undermined this principle. Well-maintained surfaces and drains protect the integrity of the sub-base, and Trésaguet introduced a system of continuous maintenance, where a roadman was allocated a section of road to be kept up to a standard.

=== Telford ===
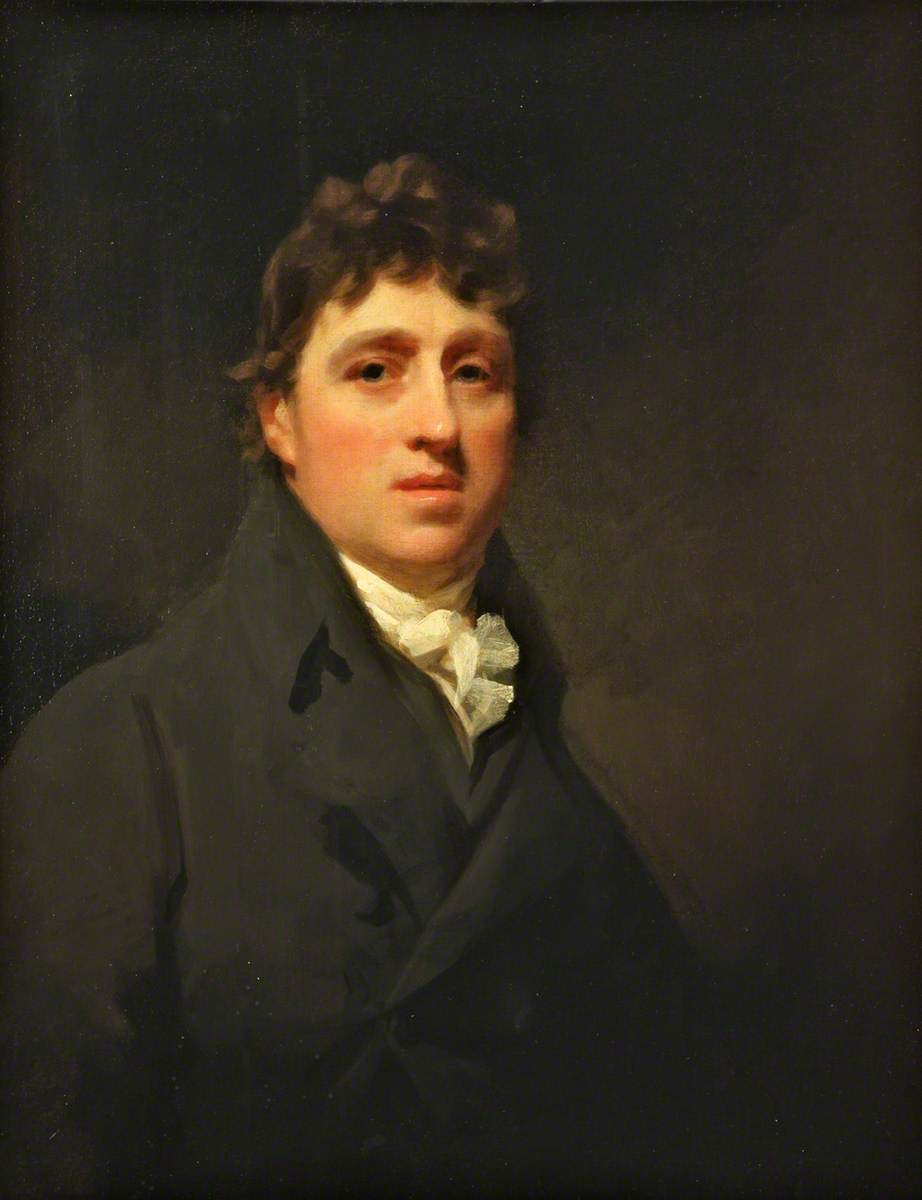
Thomas Telford, the "Colossus of the Roads" in early 19th century Britain

The surveyor and engineer Thomas Telford made substantial advances in the engineering of new roads and the construction of bridges. His method of road building involved digging a large trench in which a foundation of heavy rock was set. He designed his roads so that they sloped downwards from the centre (crown slope), allowing drainage to take place, a major improvement on the work of Trésaguet. The surface consisted of broken stone. He improved on methods for the building of roads by improving the selection of stone based on thickness, taking into account traffic, alignment and slopes. During his later years, Telford was responsible for rebuilding sections of the London to Holyhead road, a task completed by his assistant of ten years, John MacNeill.

His engineering work on the Holyhead Road (now the A5) in the 1820s reduced the journey time of the London mail coach from 45 hours to just 27 hours, and the best mail coach speeds rose from 5–6 mph (8–10 km/h) to 9–10 mph (14–16 km/h). Between London and Shrewsbury, most of his work on the road amounted to improvements. Beyond Shrewsbury, and especially beyond Llangollen, the work often involved building a highway from scratch. Notable features of this section of the route include the Waterloo Bridge across the River Conwy at Betws-y-Coed, the ascent from there to Capel Curig and then the descent from the Nant Ffrancon Pass towards Bangor. Between Capel Curig and Bethesda, in the Ogwen Valley, Telford deviated from the original road, built by Romans during their occupation of this area.

=== McAdam ===
It was another Scottish engineer, John Loudon McAdam, who designed the first modern roads. He developed an inexpensive paving material of soil and stone aggregate (known as macadam). His road building method was simpler than Telford's yet more effective at protecting roadways: he discovered that massive foundations of rock upon rock were unnecessary and asserted that native soil alone would support the road and traffic upon it, as long as it was covered by a road crust that would protect the soil underneath from water and wear.

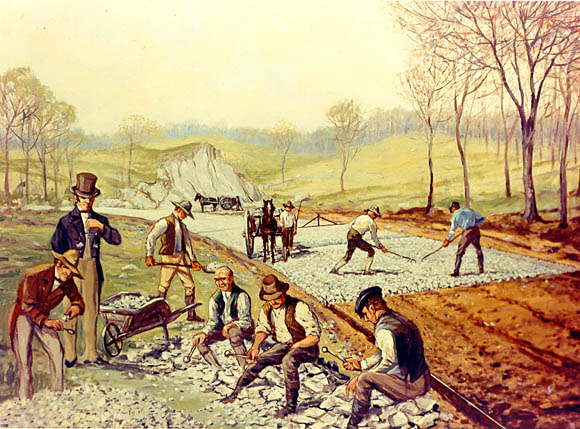
Construction of the first macadamized road in the United States (1823). In the foreground, workers are breaking stones "so as not to exceed 6 ounces in weight or to pass a two-inch ring".

Unlike Telford and other road builders, McAdam laid his roads as level as possible. His 30-foot-wide (9.1 m) road required only a rise of three inches from the edges to the center. Cambering and elevation of the road above the water table enabled rainwater to run off into ditches on either side.

Size of stones was central to McAdam's road-building theory. The lower 200-millimetre (7.9 in) road thickness was restricted to stones no larger than 75 millimetres (3.0 in). The upper 50-millimetre (2.0 in) layer of stones was limited to 20 millimetres (0.79 in) size, and stones were checked by supervisors who carried scales. A workman could check the stone size himself by seeing if the stone would fit into his mouth. The importance of the 20 mm stone size was that the stones needed to be much smaller than the 100 mm width of the iron carriage wheels that traveled on the road.

McAdam believed that the "proper method" of breaking stones for utility and rapidity was accomplished by people sitting down and using small hammers, breaking the stones so that none was larger than six ounces in weight. He wrote that the quality of the road would depend on how carefully the stones were spread on the surface over a sizeable space, one shovelful at a time.

McAdam directed that no substance that would absorb water and affect the road by frost should be incorporated into the road, neither was anything to be laid on the clean stone to bind the road. The action of the road traffic would cause the broken stone to combine with its own angles, merging into a level, solid surface that would withstand weather or traffic. Through his road-building experience, McAdam had learned that a layer of broken angular stones would act as a solid mass and would not require the large stone layer previously used to build roads. By keeping the surface stones smaller than the wheel width, a good running surface could be created for traffic. The small surface stones also provided low stress on the road, so long as they could be kept reasonably dry. In practice, his roads proved to be twice as strong as Telford's roads.

Although McAdam had been adamantly opposed to the filling of the voids between his small cut stones with smaller material, in practice road builders began to introduce filler materials such as smaller stones, sand, and clay, and it was observed that these roads were stronger as a result. Macadam roads were being built widely in the United States and Australia in the 1820s and in Europe in the 1830s and 1840s. Macadam roads were adequate for use by horses and carriages or coaches, but they were very dusty and subject to erosion with heavy rain.

== Modern roads ==
Workers tarring a road in London during World War I

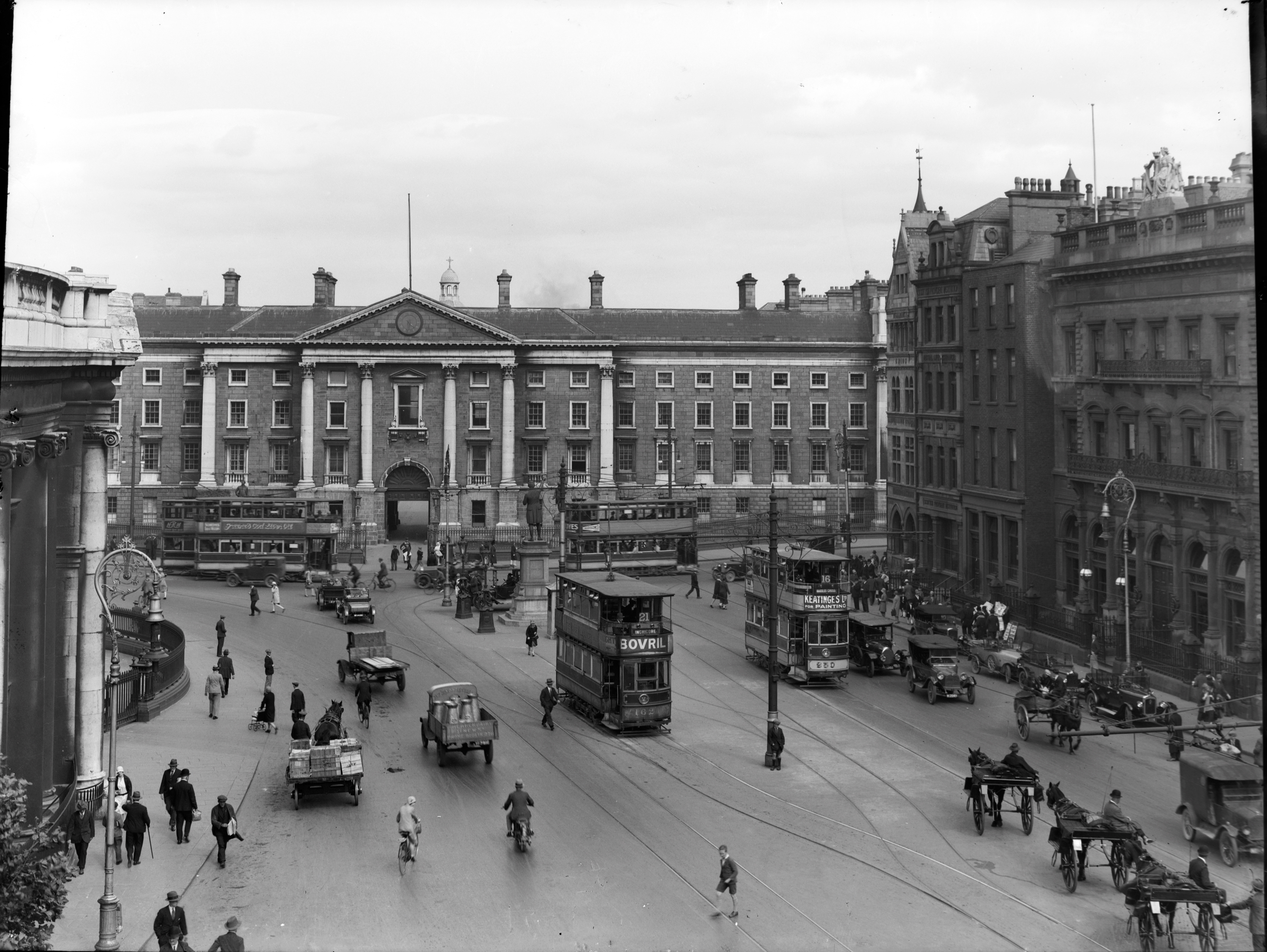
Modes of road transport in Dublin, 1929

The Good Roads Movement occurred in the United States between the late 1870s and the 1920s. Advocates for improved roads led by bicyclists such as the League of American Wheelmen turned local agitation into a national political movement. Outside cities, roads were dirt or gravel consisting of mud in the winter and dusty in the summer. Early organizers cited Europe where road construction and maintenance was supported by national and local governments. In its early years, the main goal of the movement was education for road building in rural areas between cities and to help rural populations gain the social and economic benefits enjoyed by cities where citizens benefited from railroads, trolleys and paved streets. Even more than traditional vehicles, the newly invented bicycles could benefit from good country roads.

Later on, macadam roads did not hold up to higher-speed motor vehicle use. Methods to stabilise roads with tar date back to at least 1834 when John Henry Cassell, operating from Cassell's Patent Lava Stone Works in Millwall, patented "Pitch Macadam". This method involved spreading tar on the subgrade, placing a typical macadam layer, and finally sealing the macadam with a mixture of tar and sand. Tar-grouted macadam was in use well before 1900 and involved scarifying the surface of an existing macadam pavement, spreading tar, and re-compacting. Although the use of tar in road construction was known in the 19th century, it was little used and was not introduced on a large scale until the motorcar arrived on the scene in the early 20th century.

Modern tarmacadam was patented by British civil engineer Edgar Purnell Hooley, who noticed that spilled tar on the roadway kept the dust down and created a smooth surface. He took out a patent in 1901 for tarmac. Hooley's 1901 patent involved mechanically mixing tar and aggregate prior to lay-down and then compacting the mixture with a steamroller. The tar was modified by adding small amounts of Portland cement, resin, and pitch.

=== Controlled-access highways ===
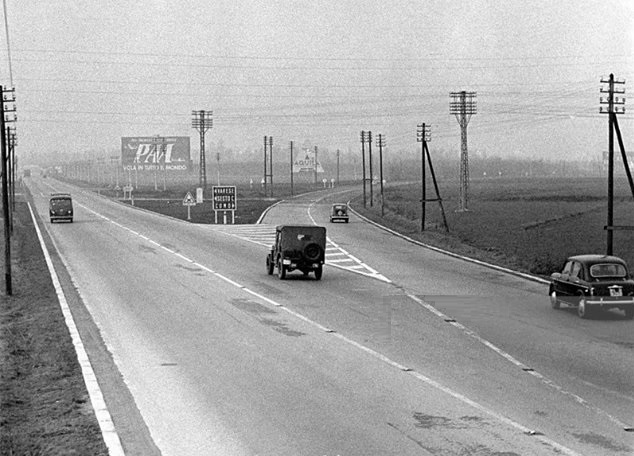
The Italian Autostrada dei Laghi ("Lakes Motorway" in the 1950s; now parts of the Autostrada A8 and the Autostrada A9), the first controlled-access highway ever built in the world

The first version of modern controlled-access highways evolved during the first half of the 20th century. The Long Island Motor Parkway on Long Island, New York, opened in 1908 as a private venture, was the world's first limited-access roadway. It included many modern features, including banked turns, guard rails and reinforced concrete tarmac. Traffic could turn left between the parkway and connectors, crossing oncoming traffic, so it was not a controlled-access highway (or "freeway" as later defined by the federal government's Manual on Uniform Traffic Control Devices).

Modern controlled-access highways originated in the early 1920s in response to the rapidly increasing use of the automobile, the demand for faster movement between cities and as a consequence of improvements in paving processes, techniques and materials. These original high-speed roads were referred to as "dual highways" and have been modernized and are still in use today.

Italy was the first country in the world to build controlled-access highways reserved for fast traffic and for motor vehicles only. The Autostrada dei Laghi ("Lakes Motorway"), the first built in the world, connecting Milan to Lake Como and Lake Maggiore, and now parts of the A8 and A9 motorways, was devised by Piero Puricelli and was inaugurated in 1924. This motorway, called autostrada, contained only one lane in each direction and no interchanges. The Bronx River Parkway was the first road in North America to utilize a median strip to separate the opposing lanes, to be constructed through a park and where intersecting streets crossed over bridges. The Southern State Parkway opened in 1927, while the Long Island Motor Parkway was closed in 1937 and replaced by the Northern State Parkway (opened 1931) and the contiguous Grand Central Parkway (opened 1936). In Germany, construction of the Bonn-Cologne Autobahn began in 1929 and was opened in 1932 by Konrad Adenauer, then the mayor of Cologne.

In Canada, the first precursor with semi-controlled access was The Middle Road between Hamilton and Toronto, which featured a median divider between opposing traffic flow, as well as the nation's first cloverleaf interchange. This highway developed into the Queen Elizabeth Way, which featured a cloverleaf and trumpet interchange when it opened in 1937 and until the Second World War boasted the longest illuminated stretch of roadway built. A decade later, the first section of Highway 401 was opened, based on earlier designs. It has since become North America's busiest highway.

The word freeway was first used in February 1930 by Edward M. Bassett. Bassett argued that roads should be classified into three basic types: highways, parkways, and freeways. In Bassett's zoning and property law-based system, abutting property owners have the rights of light, air and access to highways but not to parkways and freeways; the latter two are distinguished in that the purpose of a parkway is recreation, while the purpose of a freeway is movement. Thus as originally conceived, a freeway is a strip of public land devoted to movement to which abutting property owners do not have rights of light, air or access.

== See also ==
- Auto trails in the United States
- Caravanserai
- Dromography
- Trade route
- Horses in the Middle Ages
- Public transport bus service#History
