= Edgar Purnell Hooley =

Welsh inventor (1860-1942)

Edgar Purnell Hooley (5 June 1860 – 26 January 1942) was a Welsh inventor. After inventing tarmac in 1902, he founded Tar Macadam Syndicate Ltd the following year and registered tarmac as a trademark. Following a merger in 2013 the business became Tarmac Limited, one of the United Kingdom's largest building materials companies.

== Career ==
Born in Swansea, Hooley was articled as a civil engineer to the firm of James Craik in Bristol.

Hooley entered a business partnership with Francis Lean, as architects and surveyors at Neath, then in the county of Glamorgan, under the name of Lean and Hooley. The partnership was dissolved on 27 August 1881. Also in 1881, he became surveyor with Stow-on-the-Wold Highway Board and in 1884 he took up a similar position with the Maidstone Highway Board. He was appointed county surveyor to Nottinghamshire County Council in 1889.

In his capacity as county surveyor, Hooley was passing a tarworks in 1901 when he noticed that a barrel of tar had been spilled on the roadway and that, in an attempt to reduce the mess, someone had dumped gravel on top of it. The area was remarkably dust-free compared to the surrounding road, and it inspired Hooley to develop tarmac in Britain. Hooley applied for a patent for tarmac in 1902 (GB 7796), which was granted in 1903.

He called his company, which he registered in 1903, Tar Macadam (Purnell Hooley's Patent) Syndicate Limited, but unfortunately he had trouble selling his product as he was not an experienced businessman. On 26 July 1904, Hooley obtained a US patent for an apparatus for the preparation of tar macadam, intended as an improvement to existing methods of preparing tar macadam.

Hooley's company was bought out by the Wolverhampton MP, Sir Alfred Hickman, who was also the owner of a steelworks which produced large quantities of waste slag. The Tarmac company was relaunched by Hickman in 1905.

Hooley also undertook some military service, attaining the rank of second lieutenant in the 1st Nottinghamshire (Robin Hood) battalion on 12 March 1892, then lieutenant on 23 June 1894, and captain on 23 December 1896.

He resigned this commission on 26 March 1902. On 7 October 1914, Hooley transferred from the Territorial Force Reserve to the 8th Battalion, of The Sherwood Foresters (Nottinghamshire and Derbyshire Regiment) with the rank of Quartermaster and Honorary Captain. He subsequently transferred back to the Territorial Force Reserve. On 29 October 1920, Hooley attained the age limit for retirement, and retired, retaining the rank of Quartermaster and Captain.

Hooley died at his home in Oxford, England in 1942.

== Family ==
In 1884 Hooley married Matilda Fanny Stallard and together they went on to have two sons and two daughters, one of whom lived to be a centenarian.

== Publications ==
The following is a list of known publications by Hooley.

- "Maintenance of main roads and county management", Association of Municipal and Sanitary Engineers and Surveyors, Proceedings, 16: 174–201, 1890
- "Main road maintenance", Engineering Record, 10 August 1890
- Management of highways, 1895
- .(1896), Steam rolling; with discussion. Association of Municipal and County Engineers and Surveyors, Proceedings. Vol. 22, pp. 284–308. Surveyor, 17 July 1896
- .(1899), Notes on the Locomotives Act, 1898: with discussion. Association of Municipal and Sanitary Engineers and Surveyors, Proceedings. Vol. 25, pp. 84–103. Surveyor, 27 January 1899.
- "Road requirements", Association of Municipal and Sanitary Engineers and Surveyors, Proceedings, 33: 277–286, 1907 Summary in Surveyor 5 July 1907.
- .(1908), Modern road management. International Roads Congress; Summarised in Municipal Journal, 16 Oct; Engineering Record, 7 November 1908.
- "Tar and its uses in modern road construction", Canadian Engineer, 24 September 1909
- "Modern road repairs", Surveyor, 15 April 1910

== See also ==
- Macadam
