= Neville Simms =

British businessman and civil engineer (born 1944)

Sir Neville Simms FREng
- Born: Neville Ian Simms; 11 September 1944 (age 81); Glasgow, Scotland
- Education: Newcastle University
- Occupation: Businessman
- Title: former CEO, Tarmac plc
- Term: 1992-1999
- Predecessor: Sir Eric Pountain
- Successor: Roy Harrison

Sir Neville Ian Simms (born 11 September 1944) is a British businessman and civil engineer who was CEO of Tarmac plc from 1992 to 1999.

== Career ==
Simms was born in 1944 in Glasgow, Scotland, the son of naval officer Arthur Neville Simms MBE and his wife, Anne Davidson McCulloch. Simms was educated at Queen Elizabeth's Grammar School in Crediton and King's College, Durham, which had become Newcastle University by the time he graduated with a first class honours degree in civil engineering in 1966, and then completed a post-graduate degree in engineering at Glasgow University in 1970. After training at Ove Arup, he joined a civil engineering contractor, A. M. Carmichael, on the M9 motorway out of Edinburgh and, when that firm went into liquidation in 1970, the contract was taken over by Tarmac. He went on to become head of Tarmac Construction in 1988 and Group CEO of Tarmac in 1992. Simms became executive chairman of Carillion on its demerger from Tarmac in July 1999. He stood down as CEO in January 2001 but continued as non-executive chairman until May 2005.

Simms was heavily involved in the construction of the Channel Tunnel and served as Joint Chairman of TML for the last three years of the contract. He chaired the Business in the Community regional teams in the West Midlands and the Solent areas and served as Chairman of the Building Research Establishment Trust and Deputy Chair of Ashridge Management College.

Simms was chairman of International Power plc from October 2000 until its acquisition by GDF Suez in July 2012 and was chairman of the Thames Tideway Tunnel from December 2013 to October 2024. He has also served as a non-executive director of Courtaulds plc and was a Member of the Court of the Bank of England for seven years.

Simms was appointed a Knight Bachelor in the 1998 New Year Honours, and holds Honorary Doctorate Degrees from the Universities of Edinburgh, Glasgow and Wolverhampton.
