= Tarmacadam =

Road surface of macadam, tar and sand

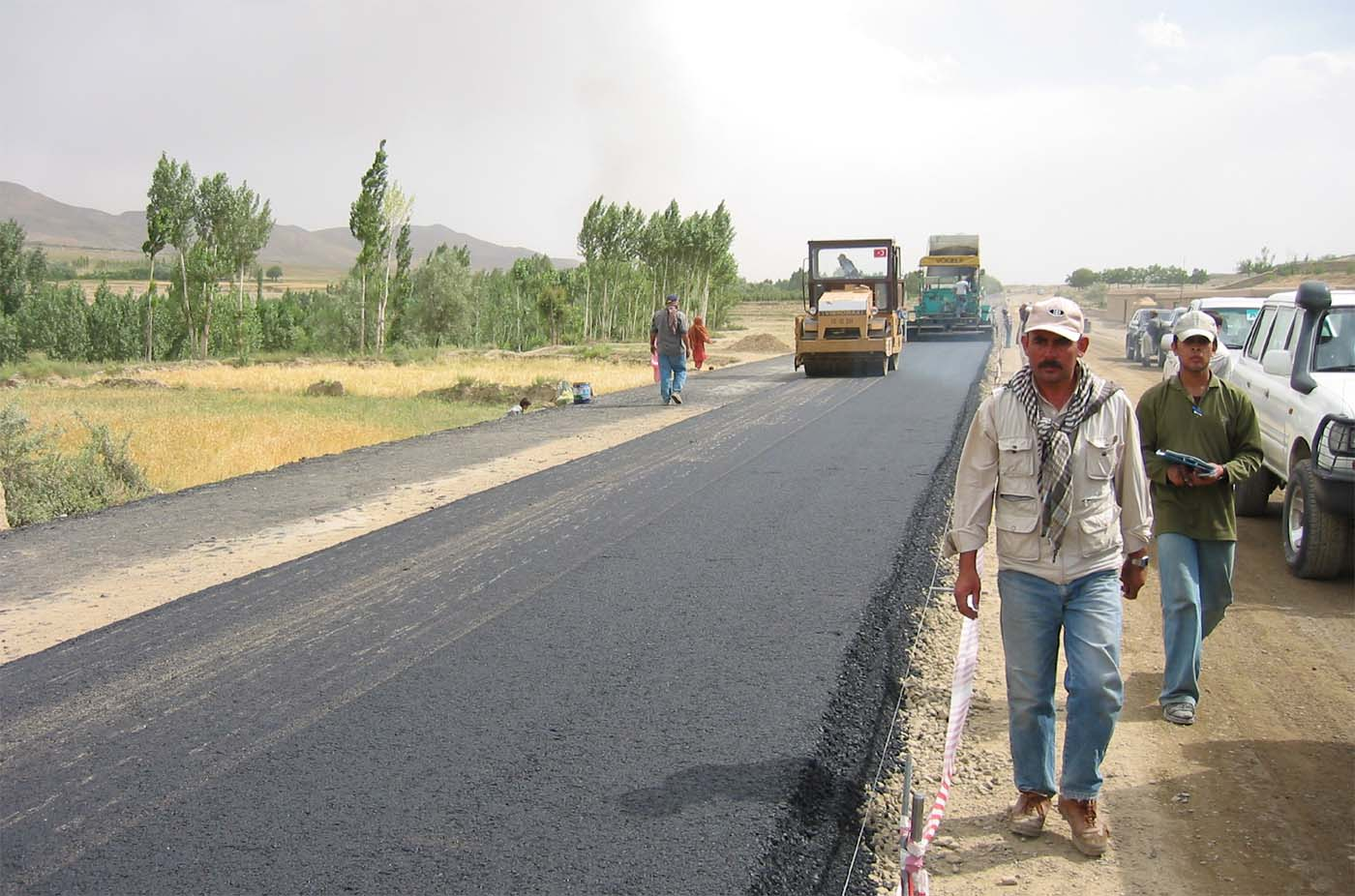

Tarmacadam (a portmanteau of "tar" and "macadam") or tarmac is a road surfacing material made by combining tar and macadam (crushed stone and sand), patented by Welsh inventor Edgar Purnell Hooley in 1902. It is a more durable and dust-free enhancement of simple compacted stone macadam surfaces invented by Scottish engineer John Loudon McAdam in the early 19th century. The terms "tarmacadam" and "tarmac" are also used for a variety of other materials, including tar-grouted macadam, bituminous surface treatments and modern asphalt concrete.

== Origins ==
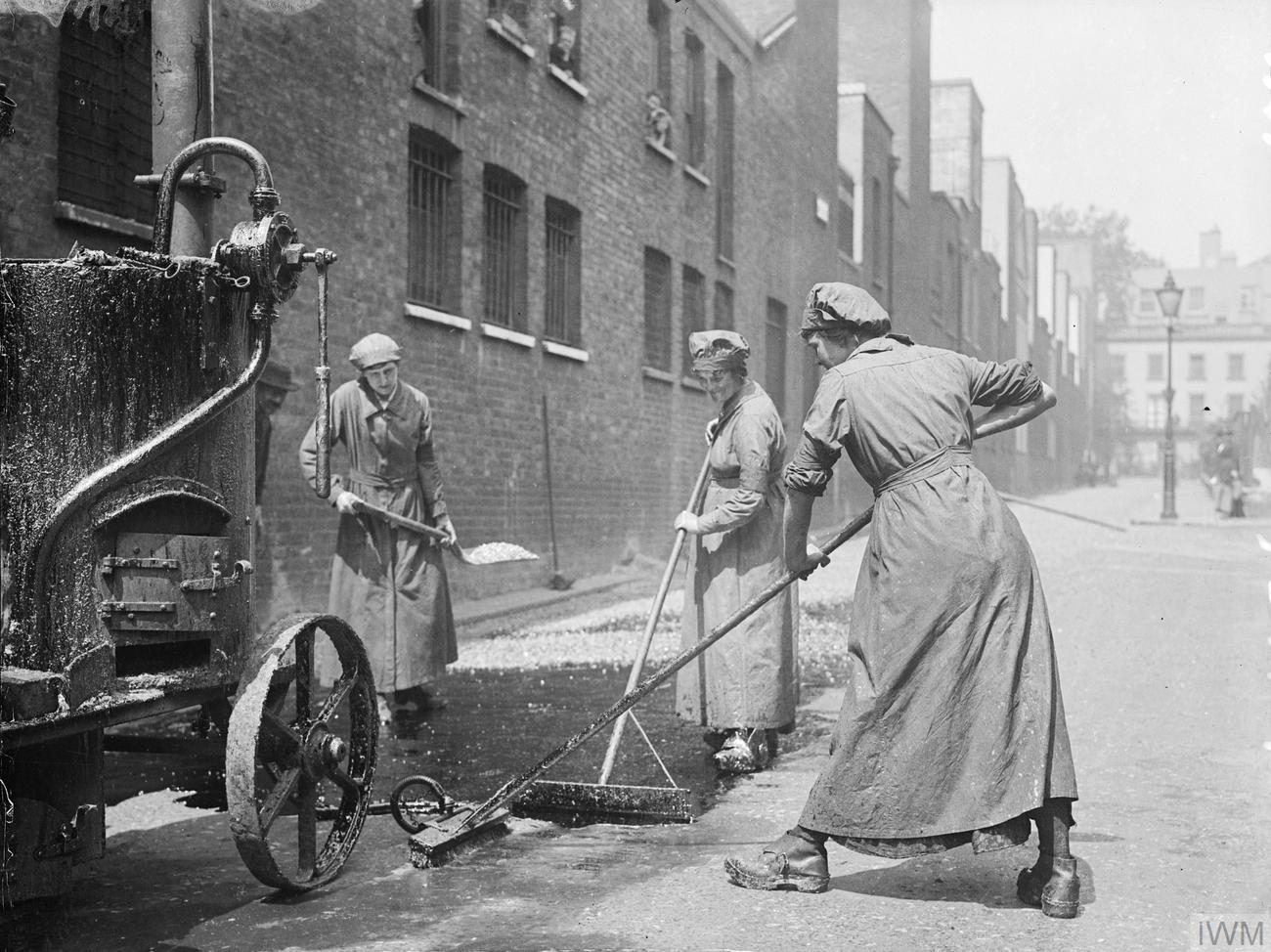
Workers tarring a road in London during World War I

Macadam roads pioneered by Scottish engineer John Loudon McAdam in the 1820s are prone to rutting and generating dust. Methods to stabilise macadam surfaces with tar date back to at least 1834 when John Henry Cassell, operating from Cassell's Patent Lava Stone Works in Millwall, England, patented "lava stone." This method involved spreading tar on the subgrade, placing a typical macadam layer, and finally sealing the macadam with a mixture of tar and sand. Tar-grouted macadam was in use well before 1900 and involved scarifying the surface of an existing macadam pavement, spreading tar and re-compacting. Although the use of tar in road construction was known in the 19th century, it was little used and was not introduced on a large scale until the motorcar arrived on the scene in the early 20th century. Ironically, although John Loudon McAdam himself had been a supplier of coke for Britain's first coal tar factory, he never in his own lifetime advocated for the use of tar as a binding agent for his road designs, preferring free-draining materials (see the page Macadam).

In 1901, Edgar Purnell Hooley was walking in Denby, Derbyshire, when he noticed a smooth stretch of road close to an ironworks. He was informed that a barrel of tar had fallen onto the road and someone poured waste slag from the nearby furnaces to cover up the mess. Hooley noticed this unintentional resurfacing had solidified the road, and that there was no rutting and no dust. Hooley's 1902 patent for tarmac involved mechanically mixing tar and aggregate before lay-down and then compacting the mixture with a steamroller. The tar was modified by adding small amounts of Portland cement, resin and pitch. Nottingham's Radcliffe Road became the first tarmac road in the world. In 1903 Hooley formed Tar Macadam Syndicate Ltd and registered tarmac as a trademark.

== Later developments ==
As petroleum production increased, the by-product bitumen became available in greater quantities and largely supplanted coal tar. The macadam construction process quickly became obsolete because of the onerous and impractical manual labour required. The somewhat similar tar and chip method, also known as bituminous surface treatment (BST) or chipseal, remains popular.

While the specific tarmac pavement is not common in some countries today, many people use the word to refer to generic paved areas at airports, especially the apron near airport terminals, although these areas are often made of concrete. Similarly in the UK, the word tarmac is much more commonly used by the public when referring to asphalt concrete.

== See also ==
- History of road transport
