= Crushed stone =

Artificial gravel of angular shape, used as construction aggregate

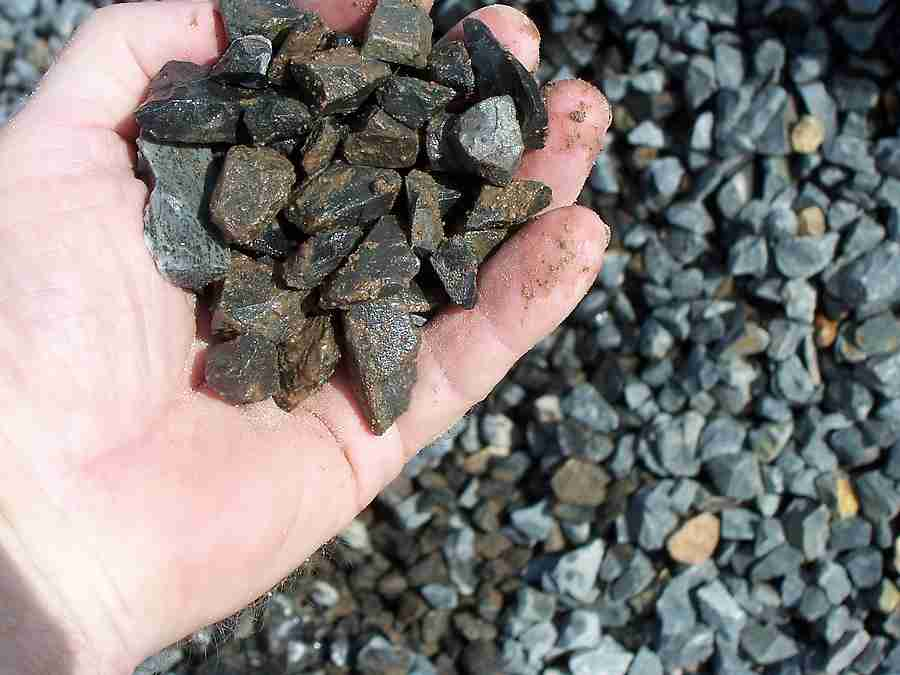
20 mm (0.79 in) crushed stone, used for construction aggregate and landscape applications

Crushed stone or angular rock is a form of construction aggregate, typically produced by mining a suitable rock deposit and breaking the removed rock down to the desired size using crushers. It is distinct from naturally occurring gravel, which is produced by natural processes of weathering and erosion and typically has a more rounded shape.

== Use ==
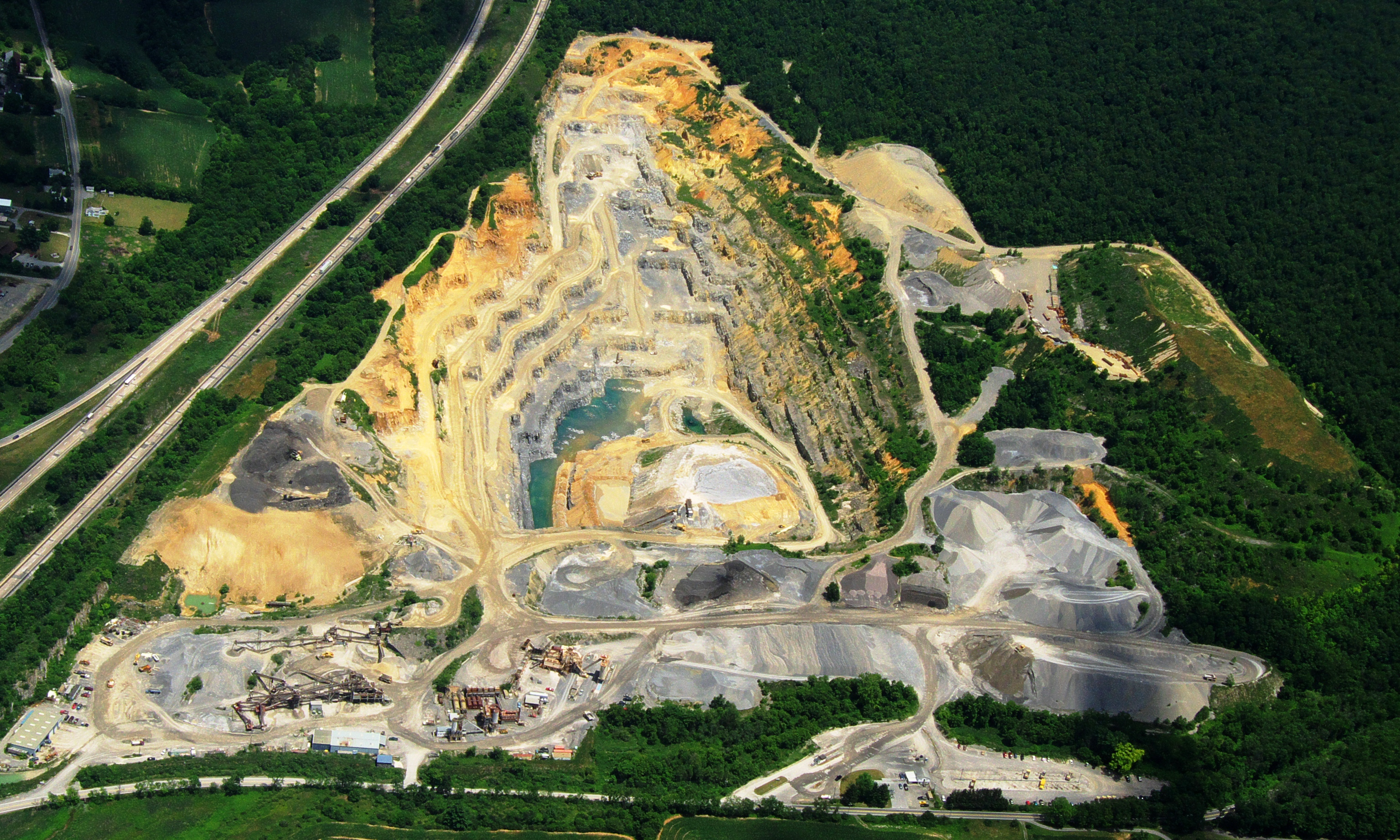
Crushed limestone quarry near Bellefonte, Pennsylvania

- Angular crushed stone is the key material for macadam road construction, which depends on the interlocking of the individual stones' angular faces for its strength.
- As riprap
- As railroad track ballast
- As filter stone.
- As composite material (with a binder) in concrete, tarmac, and asphalt concrete.
- In landscaping as a groundcover, walkway and driveway pavement, and infill for permeable pavers. As a mineral groundcover its benefits include erosion control, water conservation, weed suppression, and aesthetics. It is often seen used in rock gardens and cactus gardens.

== Background ==
Crushed stone is a major basic raw material used by construction, agriculture, and other industries. Despite the low value of its basic products, the crushed stone industry is a major contributor to and an indicator of the economic well-being of a nation. The demand for crushed stone is determined mostly by the level of construction activity, and, therefore, the demand for construction materials.

Stone resources of the world are very large. High-purity limestone and dolomite suitable for specialty uses are limited in many geographic areas. Crushed stone substitutes for roadbuilding include sand and gravel, and slag. Substitutes for crushed stone used as construction aggregates include sand and gravel, iron and steel slag, sintered or expanded clay or shale, and perlite or vermiculite.

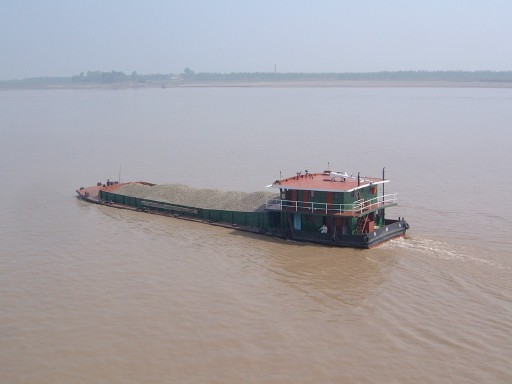
A crushed stone barge in China

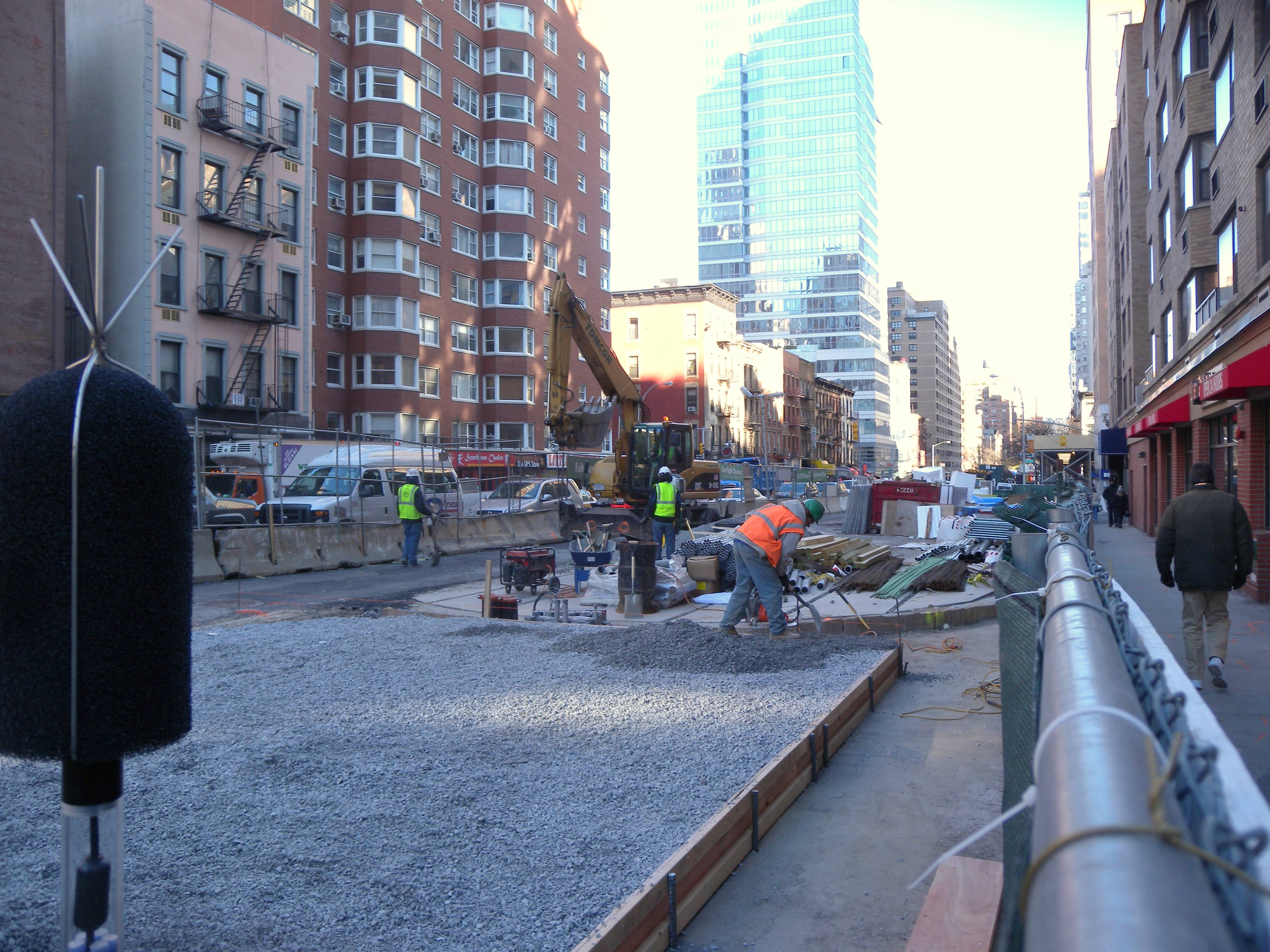
Crushed stone laid as a road base

Crushed stone is a high-volume, low-value commodity. The industry is highly competitive and is characterized by many operations serving local or regional markets. Production costs are determined mainly by the cost of labor, equipment, energy, and water, in addition to the costs of compliance with environmental and safety regulations. These costs vary depending on geographic location, the nature of the deposit, and the number and type of products produced. Crushed stone has one of the lowest average by weight values of all mineral commodities. The average unit price increased from US$1.58 per metric ton, f.o.b. plant, in 1970 to US$4.39 in 1990. However, the unit price in constant 1982 dollars fluctuated between US$3.48 and US$3.91 per metric ton for the same period. Increased productivity achieved through increased use of automation and more efficient equipment was mainly responsible for maintaining the prices at this level.

Transportation is a major factor in the delivered price of crushed stone. The cost of moving crushed stone from the plant to the market often equals or exceeds the sale price of the product at the plant. Because of the high cost of transportation and the large quantities of bulk material that have to be shipped, crushed stone is usually marketed locally. The high cost of transportation is responsible for the wide dispersion of quarries, usually located near highly populated areas. However, increasing land values combined with local environmental concerns are moving crushed stone quarries farther from the end-use locations, increasing the price of delivered material. Economies of scale, which might be realized if fewer, larger operations served larger marketing areas, would probably not offset the increased transportation costs.

== United States statistical data ==
According to the United States Geological Survey, 1.72 billion tons of crushed stone worth $13.8 billion was sold or used in 2006, of which 1.44 billion tons was used as construction aggregate, 74.9 million tons used for cement manufacture, and 18.1 million tons used to make lime. Crushed marble sold or used totaled 11.8 million tons, the majority of which was ground very fine and used as calcium carbonate.

In 2006, 9.40 million tons of crushed stone (almost all limestone or dolomite) was used for soil treatment, primarily to reduce soil acidity. Soils tend to become acidic from heavy use of nitrogen-containing fertilizers, unless a soil conditioner is used. Using aglime or agricultural lime, a finely-ground limestone or dolomite, to change the soil from acidic to nearly neutral particularly benefits crops by maximizing availability of plant nutrients, and also by reducing aluminum or manganese toxicity, promoting soil microbe activity, and improving the soil structure.

In 2006, 5.29 million tons of crushed stone (mostly limestone or dolomite) was used as a flux in blast furnaces and in certain steel furnaces to react with gangue minerals (i.e. silica and silicate impurities) to produce liquid slag that floats and can be poured off from the much denser molten metal (i.e., iron). The slag cools to become a stone-like material that is commonly crushed and recycled as construction aggregate.

In addition, 4.53 million tons of crushed stone was used for fillers and extenders (including asphalt fillers or extenders), 2.71 million tons for sulfur oxide removal-mine dusting-acid water treatment, and 1.45 million tons sold or used for poultry grit or mineral food.

Crushed stone is recycled primarily as construction aggregate or concrete.

== Terminology and variations ==
The term "high performance bedding" (HPB) is used to refer to 1/4" and 3/8" crushed rock.

Granular A, Granular B, and Granular C, all represent crushed rock mixed with sand in which Granular A has the least sand, and Granular B has the most sand. "Granular A" is also referred to as "angular crushed down to fines" or "minus" gravel.

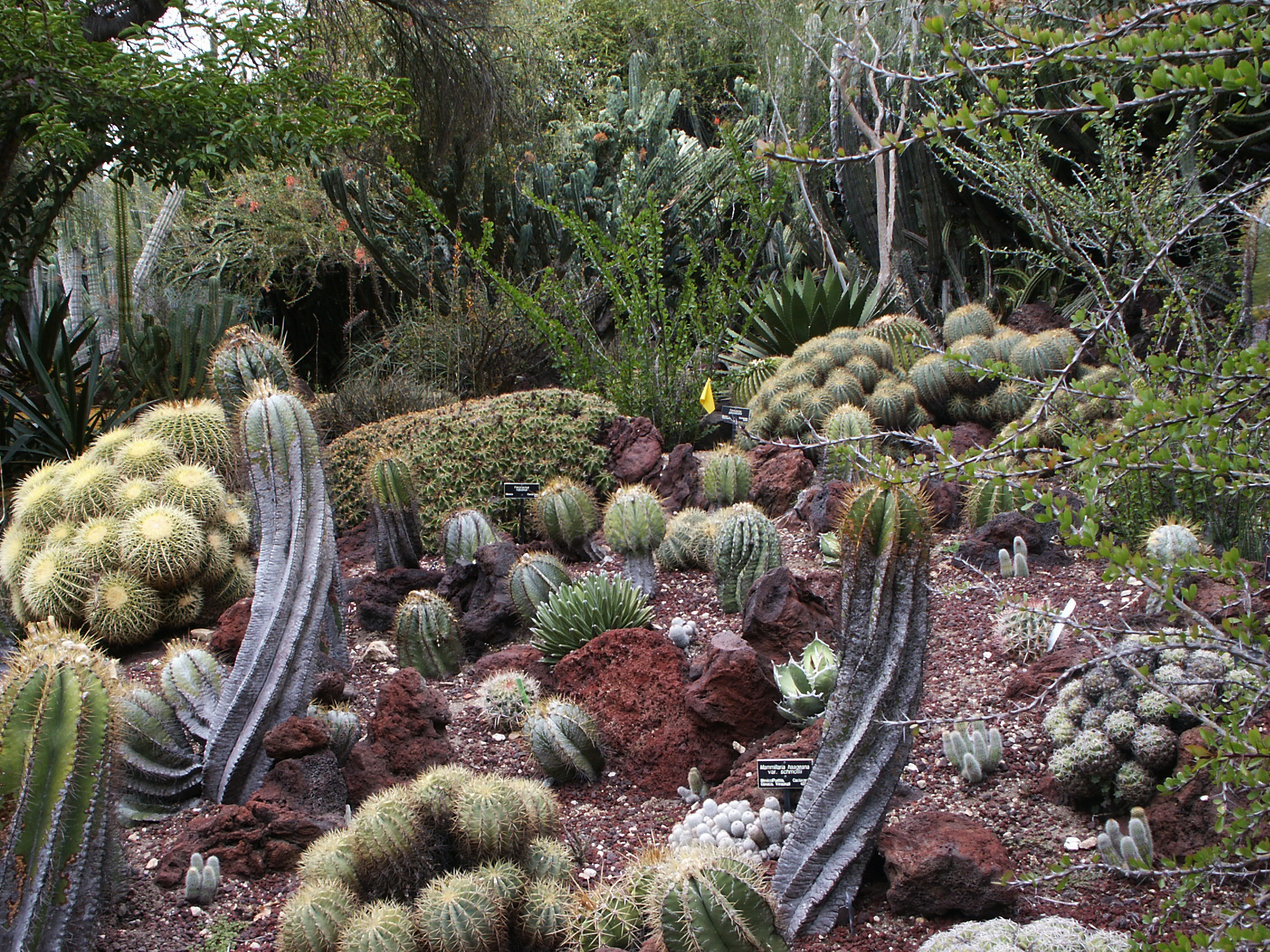
Crushed stone simulating a natural deposit at the Huntington Desert Garden, California

Uniformly sized crushed stone is commonly known as "clean rock".

== See also ==
- Aggregate (composite)
- Dimension stone
