= Tarmac Group =

Building materials company

Tarmac Group Limited
- Type: Subsidiary
- Founded: 1903; 123 years ago As the Tar Macadam Syndicate Ltd
- Founder: Edgar Purnell Hooley
- Fate: Acquired by Anglo American plc
- Successor: Tarmac Holdings
- Headquarters: Wolverhampton, United Kingdom,
- Products: Aggregates; Asphalt concrete; Ready mixed concrete; Cement; Lime
- Services: Contracting services; Recycling services
- Revenue: £1,081 million (2011)
- Number of employees: Approx 4,500
- Parent: Anglo American

Tarmac Group Limited was a British building materials company headquartered in Wolverhampton, United Kingdom. It produced road surfacing and heavy building materials including aggregates, concrete, cement and lime, as well as operating as a road construction and maintenance subcontractor. The company was formerly listed on the London Stock Exchange and was once a constituent of the FTSE 100 Index.

The company was founded in 1903 by Edgar Purnell Hooley two years after he patented the road surfacing material tarmac. The company grew quickly, first being listed on the Birmingham Stock Exchange in 1913 and on the London Stock Exchange in 1922. Despite intense competition and other challenging factors, Tarmac expanded both geographically and in its range of services, particularly as a consequence of intense demands of the Second World War. By 1953, Tarmac was processing over two million tons of slag per year while its road surfacing activities had developed into a substantial civil engineering business in its own right. During the 1950s and 1960s, it acquired numerous competitors, becoming the largest roadstone and construction group in Britain in 1968 following a three way merger between Tarmac, Derbyshire Stone and William Briggs.

During the 1970s, Tarmac Group made a decisive shift towards private home construction; by the end of the decade, it was building 4,000 houses annually and would become the largest housebuilder in Britain. At the end of the 1980s, its housebuilding activities accounted for half of Tarmac Group's profits, somewhat overshadowing its performance in other areas, such as its expansion into North America and other international markets. However, the company was ill-prepared for the recession of the early 1990s, having continued to invest heavily in land; the company's management orientated away from housing towards the construction sector. The company disposed of its remaining housing activities via an asset swap with the homebuilder Wimpey in exchange for its construction and minerals interests.

During July 1999, Tarmac demerged its construction and professional services businesses under the name Carillion; shortly thereafter, the Tarmac building materials business was acquired by Anglo American. In 2010, Tarmac Group was separated into Tarmac Limited and Tarmac Building Products. Three years later, Anglo American merged Tarmac Limited with the British-based assets of Lafarge to form a 50:50 joint venture, Lafarge Tarmac (now Tarmac Holdings). Tarmac Building Products was subsequently sold to Lafarge Tarmac in 2014.

== History ==
=== Growth of a roadstone business ===
Tarmac logo in use from 1964 to 1996

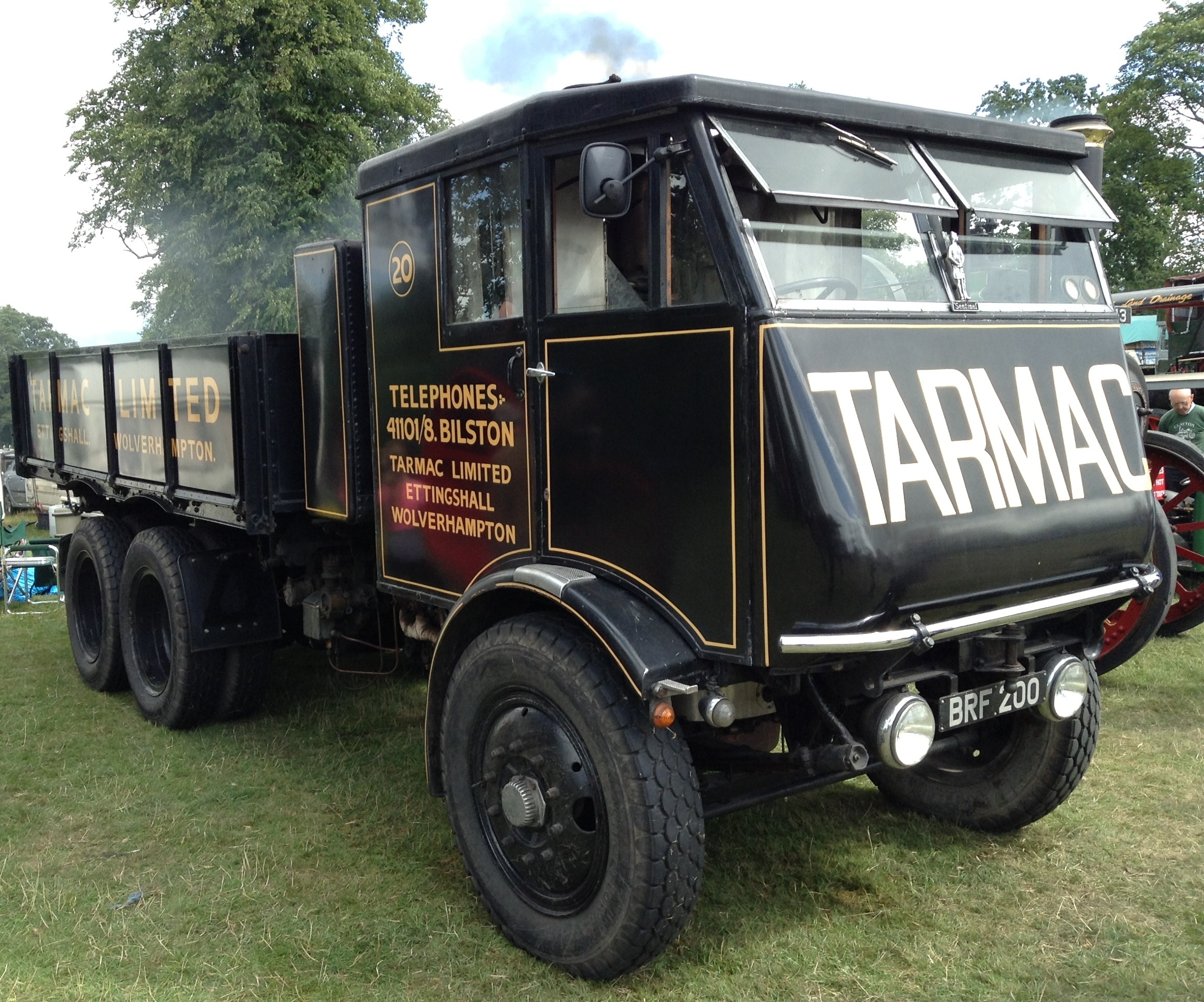
A Sentinel steam lorry in Tarmac livery (Sentinels were used extensively in the 1920s)

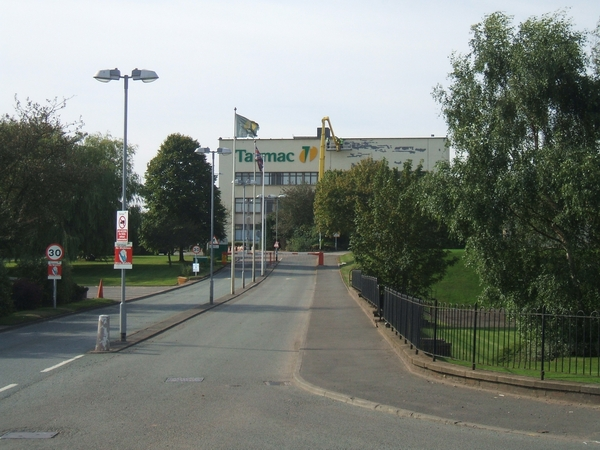
Original Tarmac Head office and depot in Ettingshall

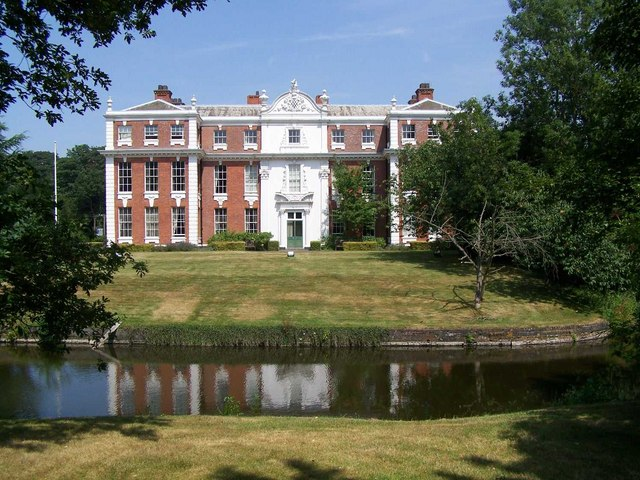
Hilton Hall: Tarmac Head Office from 1986 to 1999

The company was originally formed by Edgar Purnell Hooley as the Tar Macadam (Purnell Hooley's Patent) Syndicate Limited in 1903. A distinguishing feature of the new Tarmacadam product was that it contained cheap blast furnace slag, a by-product produced by steelworks, thus the company entered into long-term contracts with steelworks to ensure its supply.

The business was secured in 1905 by Sir Alfred Hickman, who became its first chairman. The company remained under the effective control of members of the Hickman and Martin family until 1979. There were Hickmans as chairmen until 1959; more significantly, Cecil Martin, the son in law of Victor Hickman, was appointed a director in 1923 and managing director two years later. Cecil's son Robin followed him in turn, serving first as managing director and then chairman and chief executive from 1971 to 1979.

Tarmac was first listed on the Birmingham Stock Exchange in 1913 and then the London Stock Exchange in 1922. During the 1920s and 1930s, Tarmac had to cope with national strikes, recession and periods of intense competition. Nevertheless, the company gradually expanded its geographic coverage (particularly in the south east), increased its production of paving slabs and moved into road surfacing as well as supply.

As with so many companies in the construction industry, the Second World War increased the demand for Tarmac's services, notably for surfacing the large numbers of airfields being built or modernised. By the time of its half centenary in 1953, Tarmac was processing over two million tons of slag per year, its road surfacing had developed into a significant civil engineering business, and its Vinculum subsidiary "had become one of the major precast concrete undertakings in the country."

Under Robin Martin's leadership, Tarmac moved from being an important regional force to a national roadstone and contracting business. Acquisitions played a major role in Tarmac's growth. While leading the roadstone division, Martin had been responsible in 1959 for the acquisition of local competitor Tarslag and Crow Catchpole, which gave it a greater presence in the south east. In 1964, now group managing director, Martin acquired key quarrying assets, including Cliffe Hill Granite, Rowley Regis Granite and Hillhead Hughes.

In 1968, Martin engineered the three way merger between Tarmac, Derbyshire Stone and the Scottish Asphalt company, William Briggs, creating the country's "largest roadstone and construction group". The group was briefly known as Tarmac Derby but the Derby name was later dropped.

=== Expansion into house construction and contract sectors ===
Further acquisitions came during the 1970s and 1980s. Permanite, Britain's biggest roofing felt manufacturer, and Limmer, a quoted asphalt company, were both purchased during 1971, while the 1973 purchase of Mitchell Construction (which had foundered on the Kariba Dam) strengthened Tarmac's construction division. However, the acquisition which was to radically change the direction of Tarmac was McLean Homes, which was bought at the start of 1974.

McLean was run by Eric Pountain, a one time estate agent who had sold his own housebuilding business to McLean, later taking over as managing director via a boardroom coup. McLean had been bought to strengthen Tarmac's own poorly performing housebuilding division and the enlarged operation, now run by Pountain, was producing around 2,000 houses per year.

In November 1977, the company's subsidiary, Tarmac International, was awarded a $48 million contract to expand port facilities in Aqaba, Jordan. Pountain had ambitions to become a national housebuilder, and by the end of the 1970s, McLean was building 4,000 houses per year and was a substantial contributor to group profits. However, there were problems elsewhere in the group. In 1976, Tarmac had bought the old established contracting firm of Holland, Hannen & Cubitts; this was followed by contract provisions of £16m in its Nigerian subsidiary. The head of the contracting division was dismissed and the finance director resigned. The boardroom pressure on Martin increased, and in 1979, he was forced out to be replaced by Eric Pountain as the new group managing director. Whereas Martin had created a national roadstone group, Pountain was to create the country's largest housebuilder.

By the end of the 1980s, British housebuilding was accounting for half of group profits, even though it was not the only activity to have been expanded. An alternative profits centre had been built up in North America, starting in 1984 with the staged acquisition of Lone Star Industries; by the end of the decade Tarmac was operating across seven states in the United States. Construction in the United Kingdom had also grown and Tarmac was involved in such prestige projects as the Thames Barrier and the Channel Tunnel.

=== Reorientation to heavy building materials and restructuring ===
However, the expansionary nature of the group did not leave it well placed to face the recession of the early 1990s. In particular, the housing division continued to invest heavily in land even though the market had peaked, leading to provisions of £132m in that division alone. Like his predecessor before him, Pountain was forced to step down as chief executive to be replaced by Neville Simms, previously in charge of construction. Inevitably, the emphasis moved away from housing in favour of construction. While the quarrying and construction businesses proved to be considerably stronger, rumours around this time claimed that Tarmac was actually looking to potentially sell its interests in these sectors as well.

In October 1992, Tarmac acquired the privatised government agency PSA Projects to complement Tarmac Construction. This was initially called TBV Consult (reflecting a short lived partnership between Tarmac and Black & Veatch) and was renamed TPS in 1998. Tarmac Professional Services also included a scientific and materials testing consultancy (Stanger), a facilities management company, specialist architects firms, and IT businesses.

Housebuilding was progressively reduced in size until 1995, when Tarmac announced that the division would be sold. Later that year, Tarmac and Wimpey announced an asset swap whereby Wimpey acquired all of Tarmac's housing, and in return, Tarmac received Wimpey's construction and minerals divisions. The downsizing continued, and in July 1999, Tarmac demerged its construction and professional services businesses under the name Carillion in a somewhat controversial move at that time.

=== Anglo American era and final years ===
During November 1999, Tarmac, which had been effectively consolidated around its roadstone and road surfacing businesses, accepted a bid from Anglo American Mining in exchange for nearly $2 billion. Within months of the acquisition being completed, Anglo American launched a restructuring of the company, under which a new regional structure for its quarries, asphalt and ready-mixed concrete activities was adopted. At the time, it was stated that expansion in continental Europe would be a major focus area.

In August 2007, Anglo American announced it would seek to sell Tarmac; however, in February 2008, the company went on to report that it was putting the sale on hold, allegedly due to the economic consequences of the Great Recession. In June 2008, Tarmac Iberia was sold to Holcim.

In 2010, the group was separated into Tarmac Limited and Tarmac Building Products. In February 2010, Anglo American sold Tarmac's European concrete aggregates business to Eurovia; it also sold its Polish concrete products business to the private equity firm Innova Capital. A few months later, the French concrete products business was sold to the private equity firm Foundations Capital.

In February 2011, Anglo-American announced a proposed joint venture with Lafarge that involved combining both companies' aggregates businesses in the United Kingdom. The merger, which excluded Tarmac Building Products, was completed in March 2013, following receipt of necessary approvals from the UK Competition Commission, forming Lafarge Tarmac. Tarmac Building Products, the last part of the business still wholly owned by Anglo-American, was acquired by Lafarge Tarmac in April 2014.

== Operations ==
Tarmac Group consisted of Tarmac Building Products, Tarmac Middle East and 50% of Lafarge Tarmac.

=== Tarmac Building Products ===
Tarmac Building Products was the largest supplier in the United Kingdom of heavy building products. It supplied aircrete blocks, aggregate blocks, bagged aggregates, mortar, screeds, sports surfaces, TermoDeck, foundry sands, grouts, plasters, renders, bagged cement and bagged lime. It also offers bespoke production and contract manufacturing.

=== Tarmac Middle East ===
Tarmac Middle East was one of the largest and leading suppliers of aggregates and asphalt to the Middle East construction industry. It had interests in Primary Aggregate & Road Base Materials, Armour stone, Wet mix and Asphalt Products and Asphalt & Road Base contracting services.

=== Lafarge Tarmac ===
Lafarge Tarmac was a 50:50 joint venture between Lafarge and Anglo American. It was the leading construction materials company in the United Kingdom, comprising cement, aggregates, ready mixed concrete, asphalt and contracting businesses in the United Kingdom.

== Major projects by Tarmac Construction ==
Projects undertaken by or involving Tarmac Construction prior to demerger of that business in 1999 included:

- the Preston Bypass completed in 1958
- the St Albans Bypass completed in 1960
- the Ahmed Hamdi Tunnel in Egypt completed in 1981
- the Thames Barrier completed in 1984
- the Joint European Torus completed in 1984
- Drax Power Station completed in 1984
- the Merry Hill Shopping Centre completed in 1985
- the Albert Dock refurbishment completed in 1988
- the Conwy Road Tunnel completed in 1991
- the Channel Tunnel completed in 1994
- the Medway Road Tunnel completed in 1996
- the Swindon Designer Outlet in Swindon completed in 1997
- Canary Wharf tube station completed in 1999
- the Jack Lynch Tunnel in Ireland completed in 1999
