= Macadam =

Road building method by John Loudon McAdam

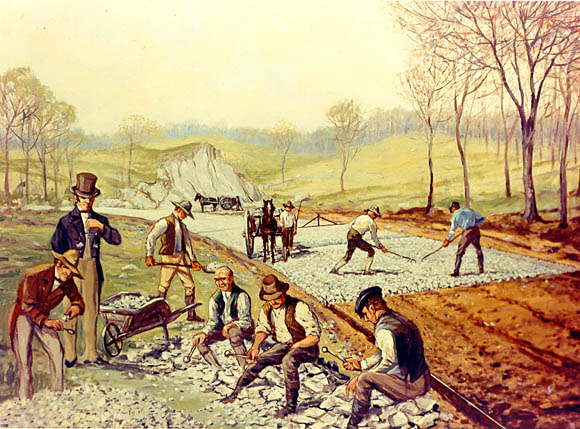
An illustration of the first macadamized road in the United States between Boonsboro and Hagerstown in Maryland in 1823; in the foreground, workers are breaking stones "so as not to exceed 6 ounces [170 g] in weight or to pass a two-inch [5 cm] ring".

Macadam is a type of road construction pioneered by Scottish engineer John Loudon McAdam c. 1820, in which crushed stone is placed in shallow, convex layers and compacted thoroughly. A binding layer of stone dust (crushed stone from the original material) may form; it may also, after rolling, be covered with a cement or bituminous binder to keep dust and stones together. The method simplified what had been considered state-of-the-art at that point.

== Predecessors ==
=== Pierre-Marie-Jérôme Trésaguet ===
Pierre-Marie-Jérôme Trésaguet is sometimes considered the first person to bring post-Roman science to road building. A Frenchman from an engineering family, he worked paving roads in Paris from 1757 to 1764. As chief engineer of road construction of Limoges, he had opportunity to develop a better and cheaper method of road construction. In 1775, Tresaguet became engineer-general and presented his answer for road improvement in France, which soon became standard practice there.

Trésaguet had recommended a roadway consisting of three layers of stones laid on a crowned subgrade with side ditches for drainage. The first two layers consisted of angular hand-broken aggregate, maximum size 3 inches (7.6 cm), to a depth of about 8 inches (20 cm). The third layer was about 2 inches (5 cm) thick with a maximum aggregate size of 1 inch (2.5 cm). This top-level surface permitted a smoother shape and protected the larger stones in the road structure from iron wheels and horse hooves. To keep the running surface level with the countryside, this road was put in a trench, which created drainage problems. These problems were addressed by changes that included digging deep side ditches, making the surface as solid as possible, and constructing the road with a difference in elevation (height) between the two edges, that difference being referred to interchangeably as the road's camber or cross slope.

=== Thomas Telford ===
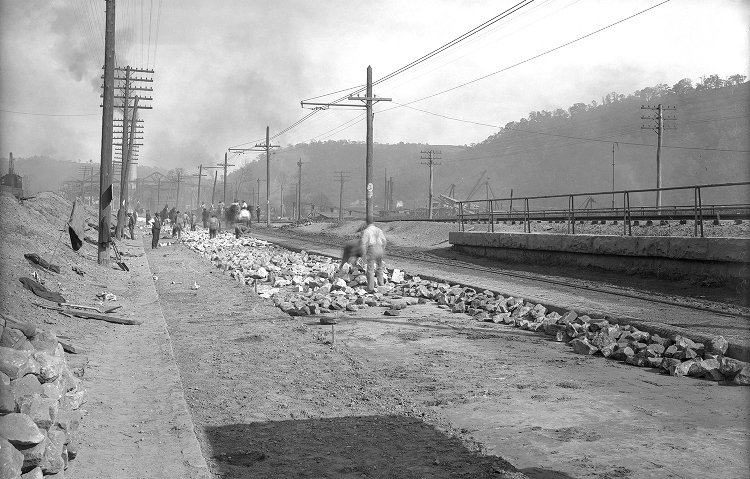
Laying Telford paving in Aspinwall, Pennsylvania, in 1908

Thomas Telford, born in Dumfriesshire, Scotland, was a surveyor and engineer who applied Tresaguet's road building theories. In 1801 Telford worked for the Commission of Highland Roads and Bridges. He became director of the Holyhead Road Commission between 1815 and 1830. Telford extended Tresaguet's theories but emphasized high-quality stone. He recognized that some of the road problems of the French could be avoided by using cubical stone blocks.

Telford used roughly 12 in × 10 in × 6 in (30 cm × 25 cm × 15 cm) partially shaped paving stones (pitchers), with a slight flat face on the bottom surface. He turned the other faces more vertically than Tresaguet's method. The longest edge was arranged crossways to the traffic direction, and the joints were broken in the method of conventional brickwork but with the smallest faces of the pitcher forming the upper and lower surfaces.

Broken stone was wedged into the spaces between the tapered perpendicular faces to provide the layer with good lateral control. Telford kept the natural formation level and used masons to camber the upper surface of the blocks. He placed a 6-inch (15 cm) layer of stone no bigger than 2.4 in (6 cm) on top of the rock foundation. To finish the road surface he covered the stones with a mixture of gravel and broken stone. This structure came to be known as "Telford pitching." Telford's road depended on a resistant structure to prevent water from collecting and corroding the strength of the pavement. Telford raised the pavement structure above ground level whenever possible.

Where the structure could not be raised, Telford drained the area surrounding the roadside. Previous road builders in Britain ignored drainage problems, and Telford's rediscovery of drainage principles was a major contribution to road construction. Around the same time, John Metcalf strongly advocated that drainage was in fact an important factor in road construction and astonished colleagues by building dry roads even through marshland. He accomplished this by incorporating a layer of brushwood and heather.

== Advent of macadam ==
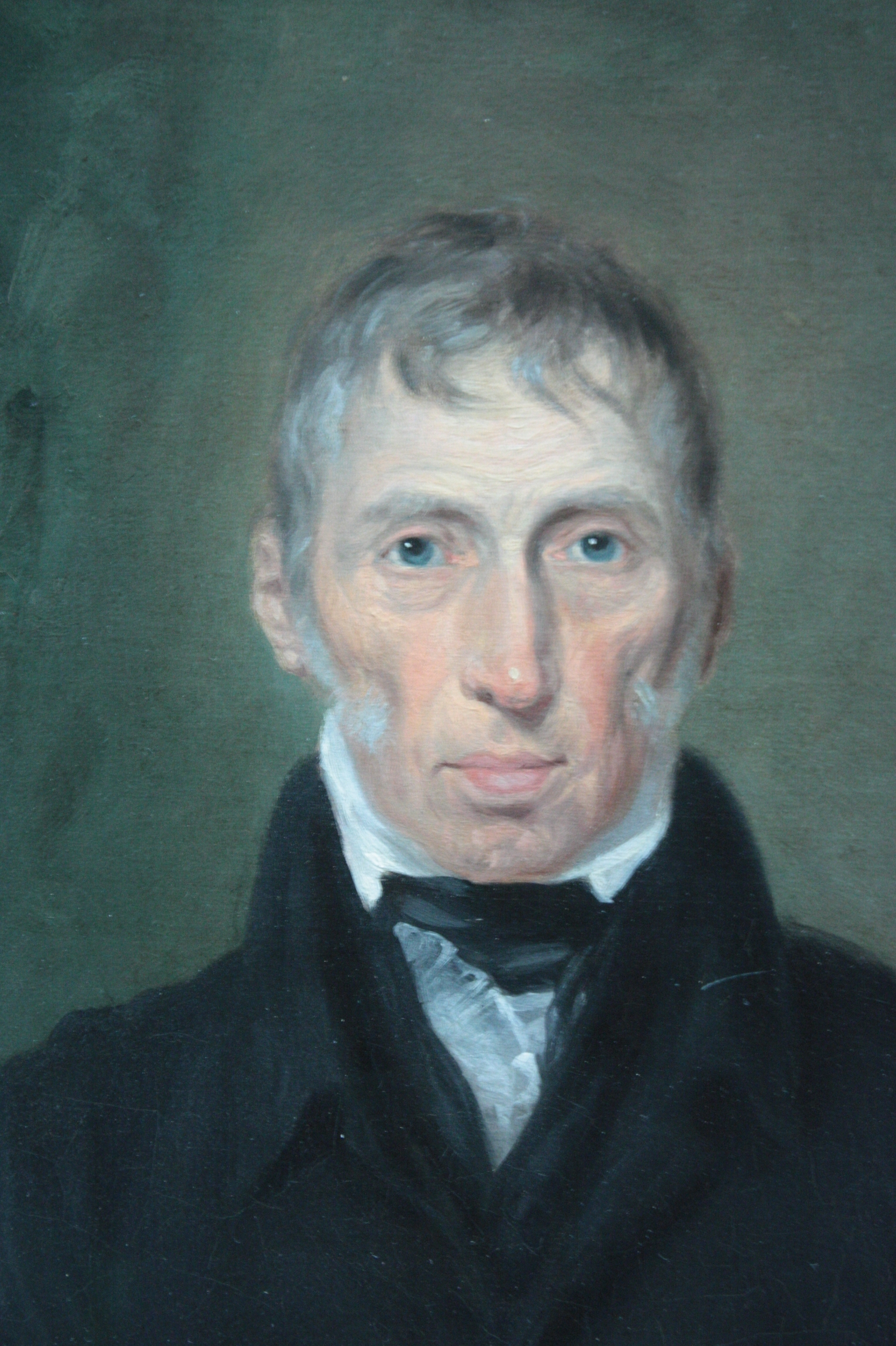
John Loudon McAdam

=== John McAdam ===
John Loudon McAdam was born in Ayr, Scotland, in 1756. In 1787, he became a trustee of the Ayrshire Turnpike in the Scottish Lowlands and during the next seven years his hobby became an obsession. He moved to Bristol, England, in 1802 and became a Commissioner for Paving in 1806. On 15 January 1816, he was elected surveyor general of roads for the Bristol turnpike trust and was responsible for 149 miles of road. He then put his ideas about road construction into practice, the first 'macadamised' stretch of road being Marsh Road at Ashton Gate, Bristol. He also began to actively propagate his ideas in two booklets called Remarks (or Observations) on the Present System of Roadmaking, (which ran nine editions between 1816 and 1827) and A Practical Essay on the Scientific Repair and Preservation of Public Roads, published in 1819.

=== McAdam's methods ===
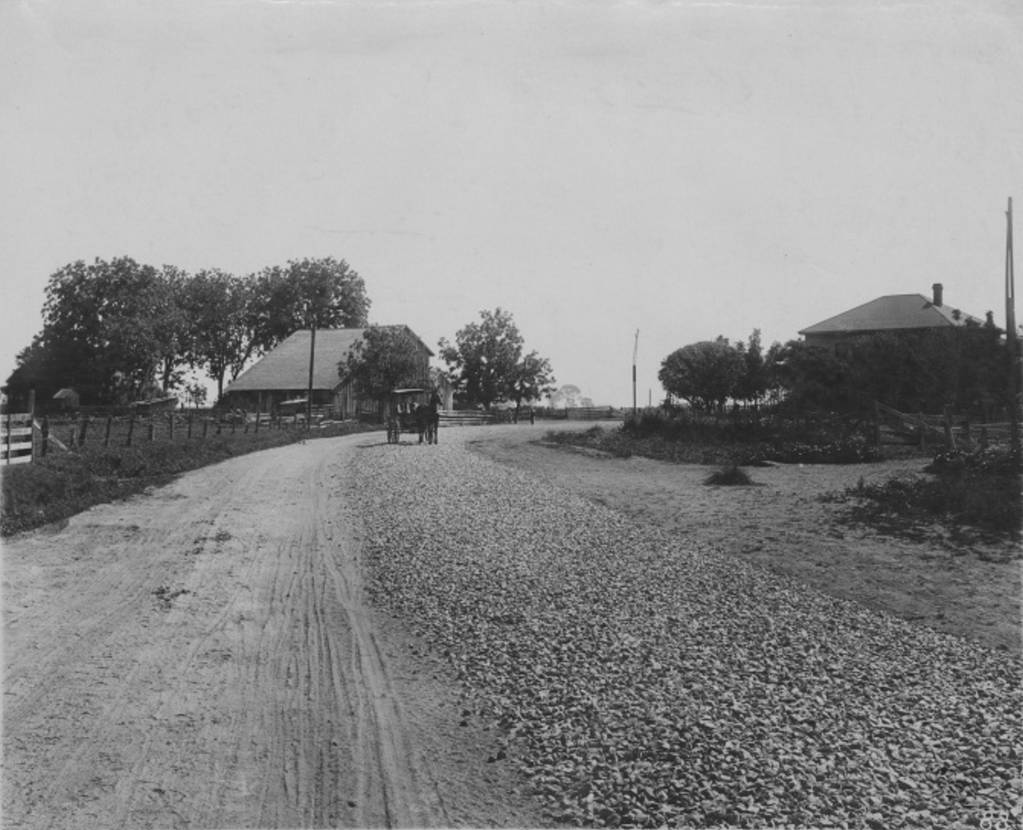
A macadam road in Nicolaus, California, c. 1850s

McAdam's method was simpler yet more effective at protecting roadways: he discovered that massive foundations of rock upon rock were unnecessary and asserted that native soil alone would support the road and traffic upon it, as long as it was covered by a road crust that would protect the soil underneath from water and wear. An under-layer of small angular broken stones would act as a solid mass. Keeping the surface stones smaller than the width of a wheel made for a good running surface. The small surface stones also provided low stress on the road, so long as it could be kept reasonably dry.

Unlike Telford and other road builders of the time, McAdam laid his roads almost level. His 30-foot-wide (9.1 m) road required a rise of only 3 inches (7.6 cm) from the edges to the centre. Cambering and elevation of the road above the water table enabled rain water to run off into ditches on either side.

Size of stones was central to McAdam's road building theory. The lower 8 in (20 cm) road thickness was restricted to stones no larger than 3 inches (7.5 cm). The upper 2-inch-thick (5 cm) layer of stones was limited to stones 2 centimetres (3/4 in) in diameter; these were checked by supervisors who carried scales. A workman could check the stone size himself by seeing if the stone would fit into his mouth. The importance of the 2 cm stone size was that the stones needed to be much smaller than the four-inch (10 cm) width of the iron carriage wheels that travelled on the road.

McAdam believed that the "proper method" of breaking stones for utility and rapidity was accomplished by people sitting down and using small hammers, breaking the stones so that none of them was larger than six ounces (170 g) in weight. He also wrote that the quality of the road would depend on how carefully the stones were spread on the surface over a sizeable space, one shovelful at a time.

McAdam directed that no substance that would absorb water and affect the road by frost should be incorporated into the road. Neither was anything to be laid on the clean stone to bind the road. The action of the road traffic would cause the broken stone to combine with its own angles, merging into a level, solid surface that would withstand weather or traffic.

=== North America ===
The first macadam road built in the United States was constructed between Hagerstown and Boonsboro, Maryland, and was named at the time Boonsborough Turnpike Road. This was the last section of unimproved road between Baltimore on the Chesapeake Bay to Wheeling on the Ohio River. Before it was macadamized, stagecoaches travelling the Hagerstown to Boonsboro road in the winter had taken 5 to 7 hours to cover the 10-mile (16 km) stretch.

This road was completed in 1823, using McAdam's road techniques, except that the finished road was compacted with a cast iron roller instead of relying on road traffic for compaction. The second American road built using McAdam principles was the Cumberland Road which was 73 miles (117 km) long and was completed in 1830 after five years of work.

=== McAdam's influence ===
McAdam's renown is based upon his effective and economical construction, which was a great improvement over the methods used by his generation. He emphasised that roads could be constructed for any kind of traffic, and he helped to alleviate the resentment travellers felt toward increasing traffic on the roads. His legacy lies in his advocacy of effective road maintenance and management. He advocated a central road authority with trained professional officials who could be paid a salary that would keep them from corruption. These professionals could give their entire time to these duties and be held responsible for their actions.

== Water-bound macadam ==
McAdam's road building technology was applied to roads by other engineers. One of those engineers was Richard Edgeworth, who filled the gaps between the surface stones with a mixture of stone dust and water, providing a smoother surface for the increased traffic using the roads. This basic method of construction is sometimes known as water-bound macadam, and although it requires a great deal of manual labour, it results in a strong and free-draining pavement. Roads constructed in this manner were described as "macadamized."

== Tar-bound macadam ==
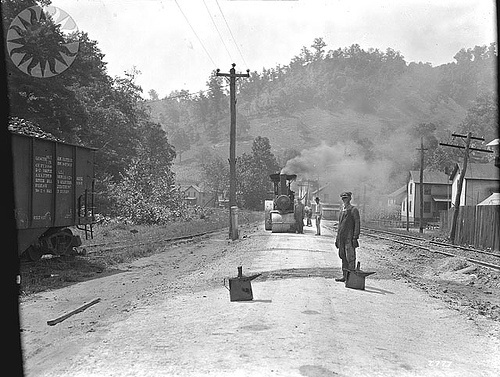
New macadam road construction at McRoberts, Kentucky: pouring tar. 1926

With the advent of motor vehicles, dust became a serious problem on macadam roads. The area of low air pressure created under fast-moving vehicles sucked dust from the road surface, creating dust clouds and a gradual unraveling of the road material. This problem was approached by spraying tar on the surface to create tar-bound macadam. In 1902 a Swiss doctor, Ernest Guglielminetti, came upon the idea of using tar from Monaco's gasworks for binding the dust. Later a mixture of coal tar and construction aggregate, patented by Edgar Purnell Hooley as tarmac, was introduced.

A more durable road surface (modern mixed asphalt pavement), sometimes referred to in the U.S. as blacktop, was introduced in the 1920s. Instead of laying the stone and sand aggregates on the road and then spraying the top surface with binding material, in the asphalt paving method the aggregates are thoroughly mixed with the binding material and the mixture is laid all together. While macadam roads have been resurfaced in most developed countries, some are preserved along stretches of roads such as the United States' National Road.

Because of the historic use of macadam as a road surface, roads in some parts of the United States (such as parts of Pennsylvania) are referred to as macadam, even though they might be made of asphalt or concrete. Similarly, the term "tarmac" is sometimes colloquially applied to asphalt roads or aircraft runways.

== See also ==
- History of road transport
