= Tarmac (company) =

British company

- Type: Subsidiary
- Industry: Building materials
- Founded: March 2013; 13 years ago (as Lafarge Tarmac)
- Headquarters: Solihull, England, UK
- Area served: United Kingdom
- Key people: Martin Riley (Senior Vice President); Cyrille Ragoucy (former CEO)
- Products: Aggregates; Ready-mix concrete; Asphalt; Asphalt surfacing; Cement
- Services: Maintenance services Waste services
- Revenue: £1.8 billion (2010 pro forma)
- Number of employees: 10,658
- Parent: CRH plc
- Subsidiaries: Tarmac Trading; Tarmac Holdings; Tarmac Cement and Lime; Tarmac Services; Tarmac Building Products
- Website: www.tarmac.com

Logo as Lafarge Tarmac

Tarmac is a British building materials company headquartered in Solihull, England. The company was formed as Lafarge Tarmac in March 2013, by the merger of Anglo American's Tarmac UK and Lafarge's operations in the United Kingdom. In July 2014, Anglo American agreed to sell its stake to Lafarge, to assist Lafarge in its merger with Holcim and allay competition concerns.

Prior to 1999, Tarmac Plc was an aggregates to construction company dating from 1903. It was demerged in July 1999, with the Construction and Professional services arms forming Carillion plc. The aggregates and building materials side of the business retained the Tarmac name and was bought by Anglo American shortly afterwards.

In February 2015, Lafarge announced that the business would be sold to CRH plc, once Anglo American had sold its stake. Anglo American completed the sale in July 2015, and the acquisition by CRH completed the following month. Following the purchase, Lafarge Tarmac was rebranded as Tarmac.

== History ==
=== Formation ===
In February 2011, Anglo American and Lafarge announced their intention to merge their British construction materials businesses, excluding Lafarge's gypsum activities. In September 2011, the proposed transaction was referred to the Competition Commission by the Office of Fair Trading, and in February 2012, the Commission reported that it had a "number of concerns" about the combination.

The deal was set to combine Anglo American's Tarmac UK unit, employing 4,500 people, with Lafarge's cement, concrete and aggregate quarries, depots and terminals. Due to the size of the venture, the Office of Fair Trading referred it to the United Kingdom's Competition Commission, who concluded in May 2012 that due to the potential loss of competition in the aggregates, asphalt, cement and ready mix concrete markets, some of their assets should be sold.

In November 2012, Lafarge and Anglo American agreed to the sale of £285 million worth of British assets to Mittal Investments. In December 2012, Anglo American's Tarmac unit became Hope Ready Mixed Concrete Limited, whilst Lafarge's assets became Hope Cement Limited. The deal was completed in January 2013 with the creation of Hope Construction Materials.

The merger was completed in March 2013, following receipt of necessary approvals from the Competition Commission.

Lafarge Tarmac bought Tarmac Building Products from Anglo American in April 2014.

=== Sale to CRH ===
Also in April 2014, Lafarge announced it was merging with Switzerland-based cement giant Holcim Ltd., to form the world's largest cement producer, LafargeHolcim. Three months later, in July 2014, Anglo American advised it was selling its 50% interest to Lafarge SA for £885 million ($1.5 billion), in part to allow the merger to clear regulatory hurdles.

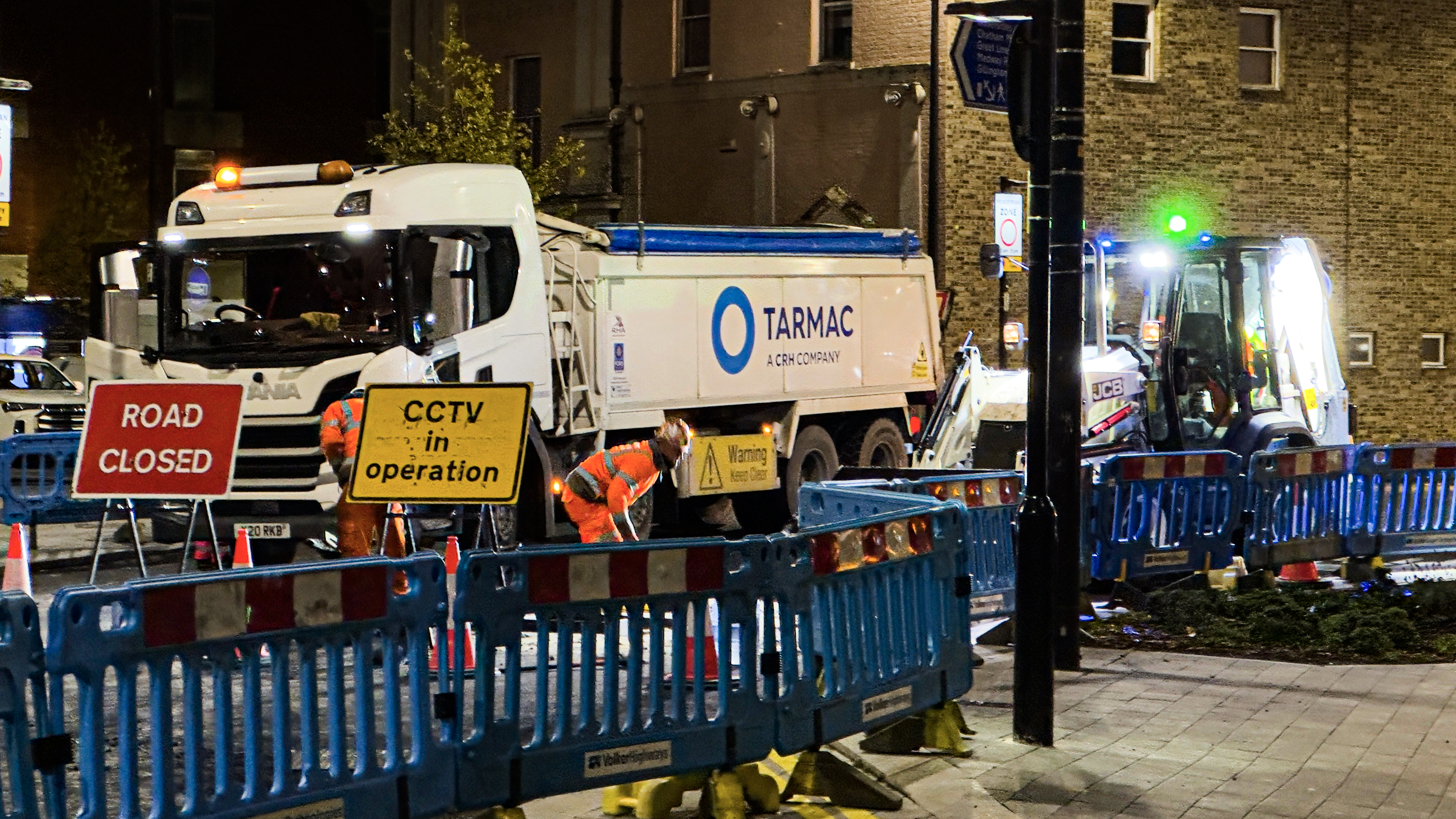
A Tarmac lorry during the Chatham Waterfront bus station road resurface works

In February 2015, Lafarge announced it had reached an agreement to sell the company to CRH plc, with the exception of its Cauldon cement plant. Anglo American sold its 50% stake to Lafarge first, for £992 million ($1.55 billion), in order to allow CRH to buy the complete business. CRH completed the purchase in August 2015.

In January 2018, Tarmac bought £160m turnover Welsh civil engineering contractor Alun Griffiths (Contractors). The Abergavenny-based firm had not traded profitably since the acquisition, and in 2025, an "urgent restructure", involving staff redundancies, was launched after their accounts reported a £95m loss from a turnover of £263m. In the same year Tarmac sold the business back to its founder.
