= Dromography =

Dromography (Gr. δρόμος, dromos "way, street, route, corridor" + γράφω, grapho "I write") is the comparative study of organisation, history, geography and logistics of local, regional and global trade routes, and other movement, transportation and communication networks. Dromography is one of the auxiliary disciplines of research on world history.

The introduction of this neologism or its definition is attributed to T. Matthew Ciolek. The term is considered a close cousin of "dromograph", which is a device used to record the circulation of blood.

== See also ==
- Caravanserai
- Cargo
- History of transport
- Navigation
