= Haddrill =

Haddrill is a surname. Notable people with the surname include:

- Robbie Haddrill (born 1981), Australian rules footballer
- Stephen Haddrill, English businessman
