= John Melhuish Strudwick =

English painter

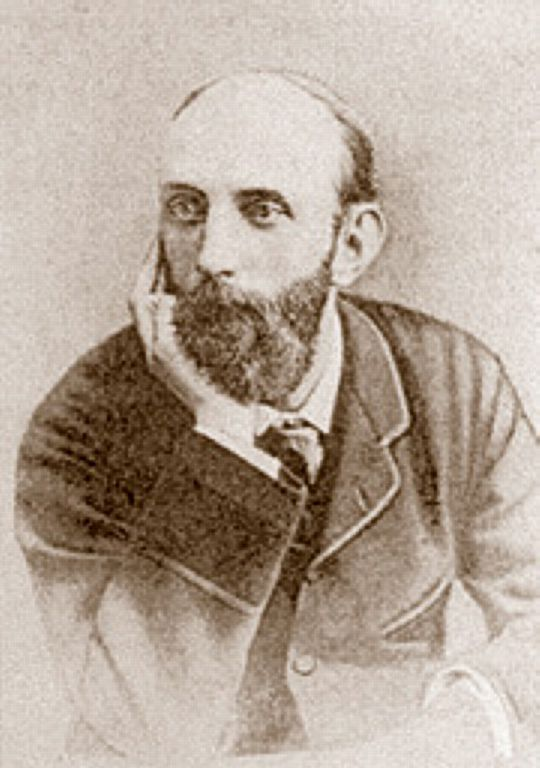
- Born: 6 May 1849; Clapham
- Died: 16 July 1937; Brook Green
- Occupation: Painter

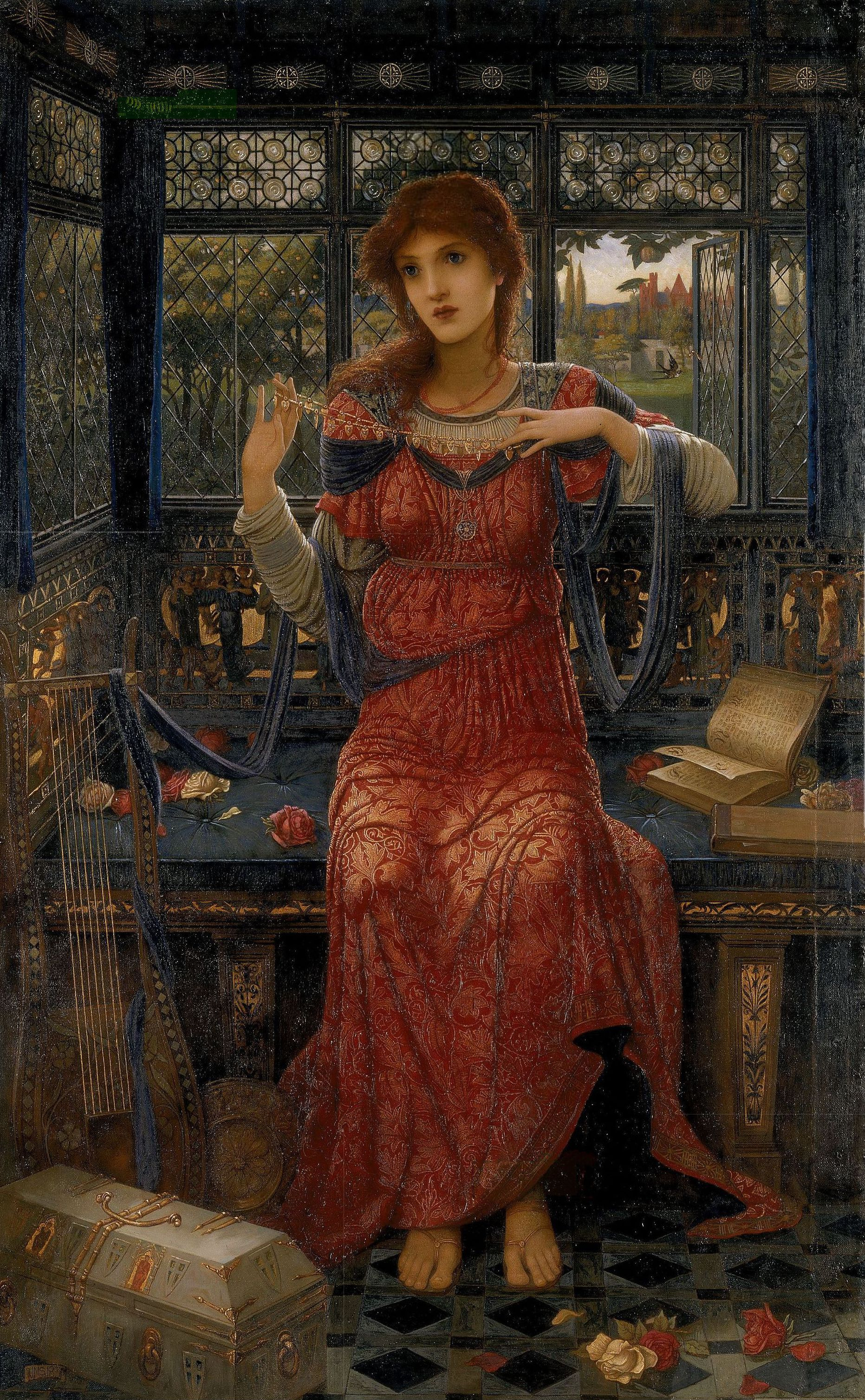
Oh Swallow, Swallow..., 1894

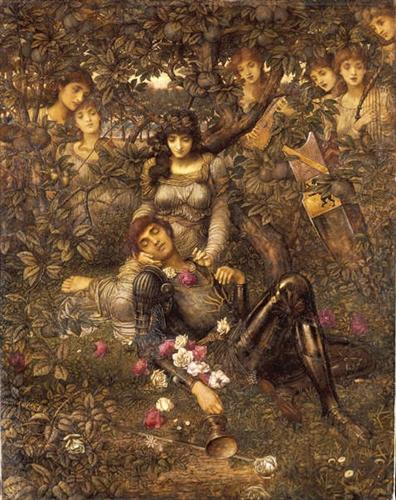
Acrasia, c. 1888

John Melhuish Strudwick (6 May 1849 in Clapham, London – 16 July 1937 in Hammersmith), was a British Pre-Raphaelite painter.

== Early life ==
Strudwick was the son of William Strudwick (1808–1861) and Sarah Melhuish (1800–1862). He attended St Saviour's Grammar School in Southwark. Disliking the idea of a business career, he took classes at the Royal Academy Schools in South Kensington, but was not regarded as a promising student.

== Painting ==
In the 1860s he was encouraged by a visitor, the Scottish genre painter, John Pettie, whose style he subsequently emulated. His depiction of the ballad of 'Auld Robin Gray', which was exhibited at the Royal Society of British Artists in 1873, is an example of this period. His art style, however, developed in a new direction in the 1870s when he worked first as studio assistant to Spencer Stanhope and then to Edward Burne-Jones. In keeping with artists in his circle, he exhibited at the Grosvenor Gallery and the New Gallery in London. Strudwick's studio was in Hammersmith, close to that of Burne-Jones and Thomas Matthews Rooke, who had also been an assistant to Burne-Jones. He married Harriet Reed and had a single daughter, Ethel (1880–1954), who later became High Mistress of St Paul's Girls' School from 1927 to 1948, and was appointed a CBE.

His initial success as a painter came to an end when wealthy and influential patrons such as the Liverpool shipowners William Imrie and George Holt withdrew their support. His painting "When Sorrow comes in Summer Days, Roses Bloom in Vain" was left half finished in protest at the seemingly orchestrated collapse of his career.

== Style ==
Strudwick's paintings were done in a blend of medieval and Renaissance styles, with meticulous attention to detail, especially in his treatment of draperies and accessories, and leading to a very small output. Some thirty of his paintings depict legendary and symbolic subjects, sometimes employing a lapidary technique from the Italian quattrocento. He employed rich, deep colours, faces clearly inspired by Burne-Jones and sumptuous drapery. His work was regularly slated by Frederic George Stephens, a failed painter become critic for the Athenaeum, who could find little positive to say. Bernard Shaw was a friend and a fan, and wrote a long appreciation in The Art Journal (April 1891).

== Death ==
His obituary in The Times described him as "a beautiful old man... [and] a charming personality, exceedingly kind to young artists."

== Notable works ==
One of Strudwick's works, "Thy Music, faintly falling, dies away, Thy dear eyes dream that Love will live for aye" has in recent times had two celebrated owners - writer and broadcaster Sir Tim Rice in the 1970s, and in 1987, P.C. Withers of Reading, a leading authority on Strudwick. It was originally bought from the artist by the shipowner William Imrie of 'Holmstead', Mossley Hill in Liverpool. The picture's title is from a couplet by G.F. Bodley (1827–1907), the eminent architect who was closely associated with the later Pre-Raphaelite movement. Another painting, The Gentle Music of a Bygone Day, sold for £276,500 at a Christie's auction in 1993.

== Gallery ==
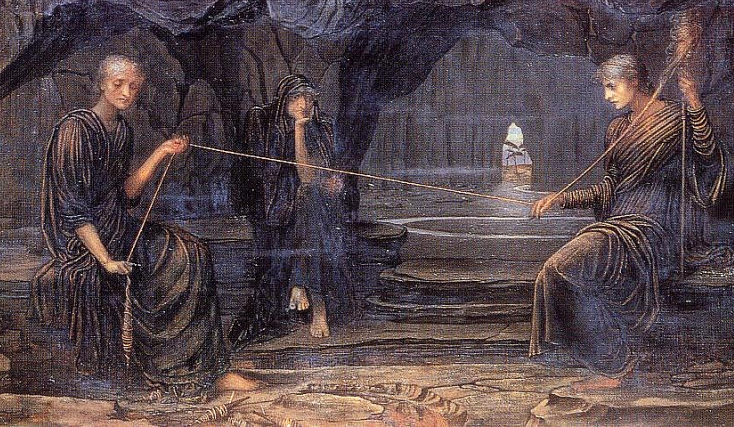
A Golden Thread
1885

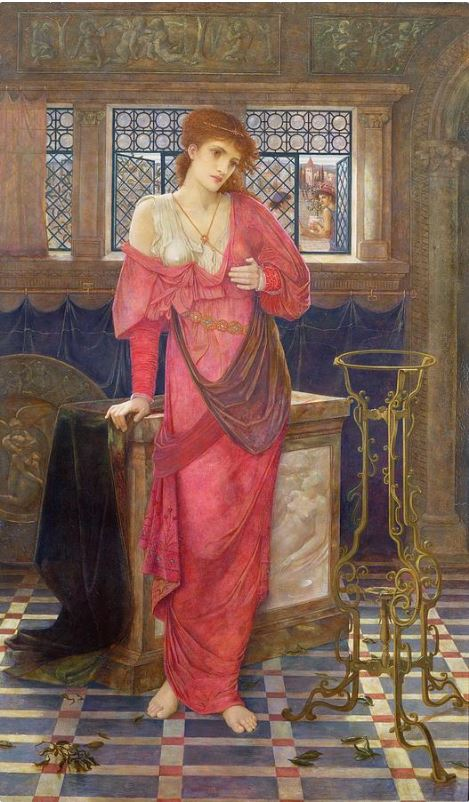
Isabella
circa 1886

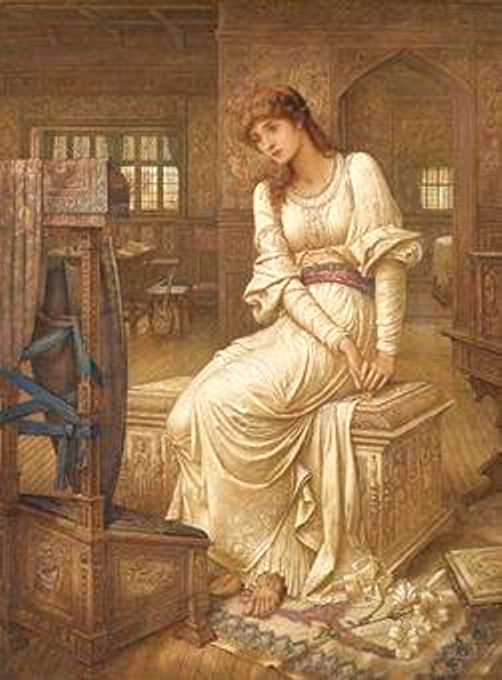
Elaine
1891

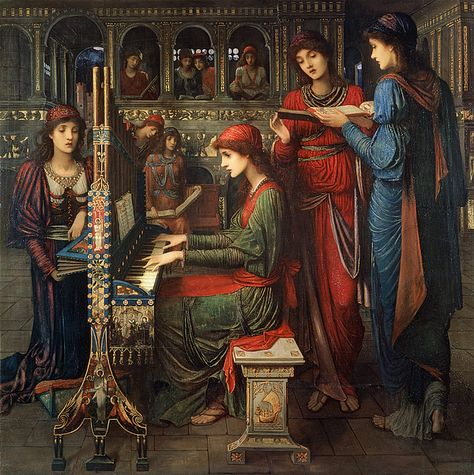
Evensong, St. Cecilia
1897

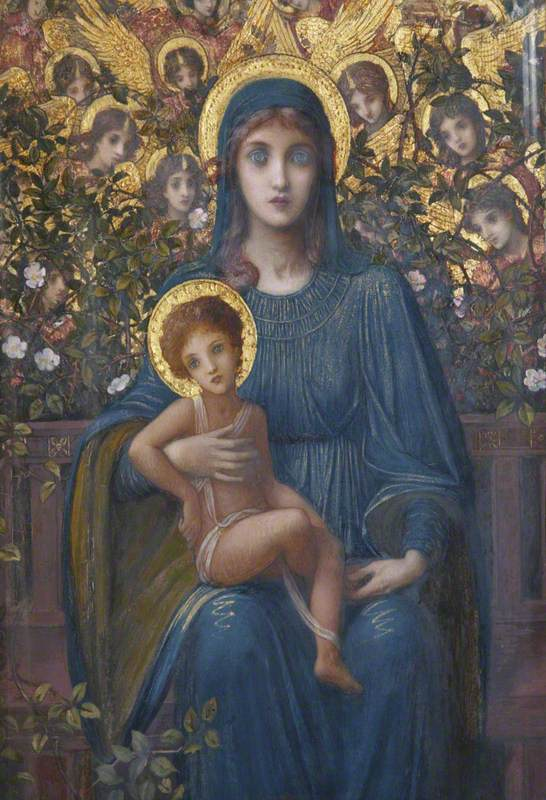
Virgin and Child
1901

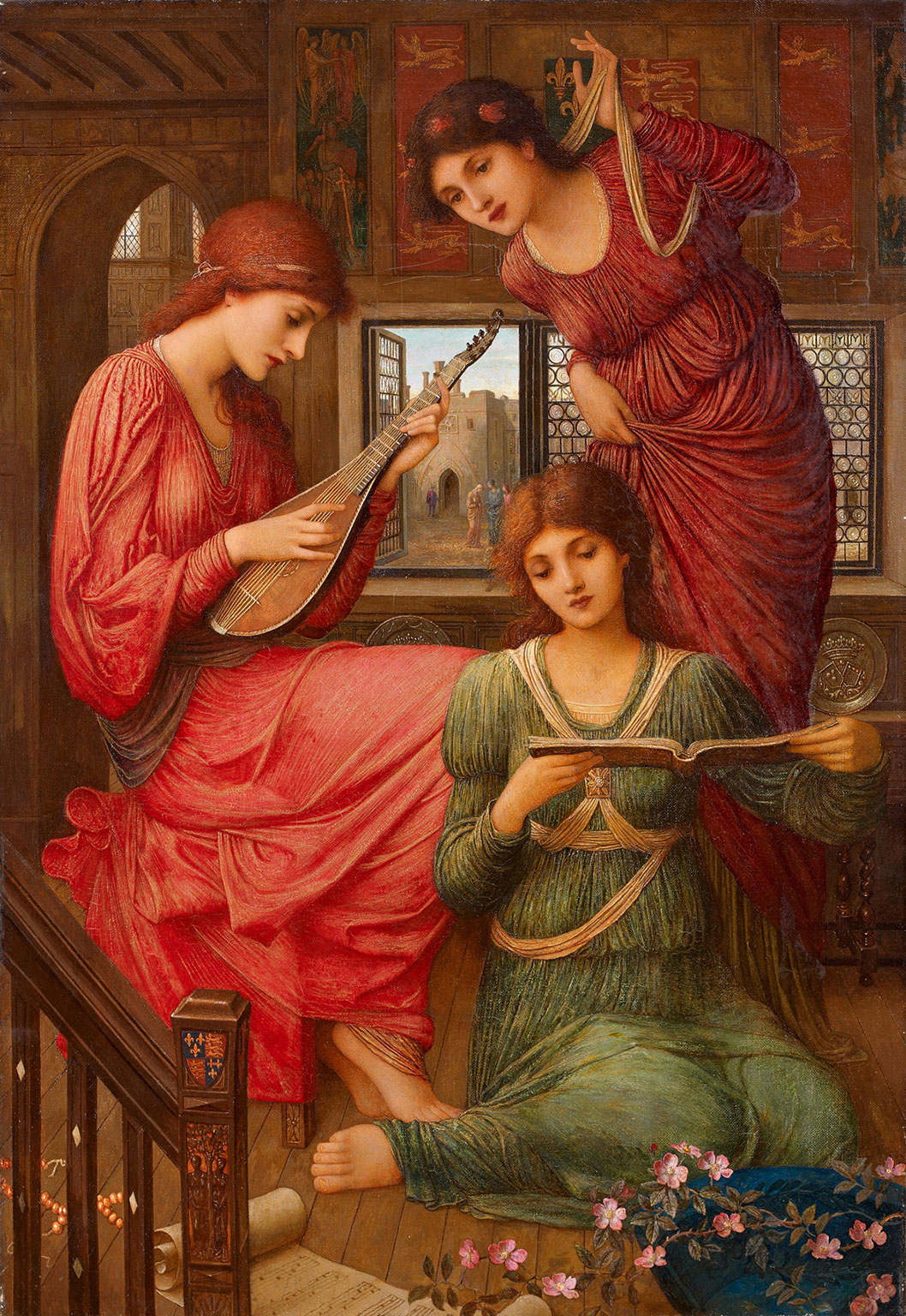
In the Golden Days
1907

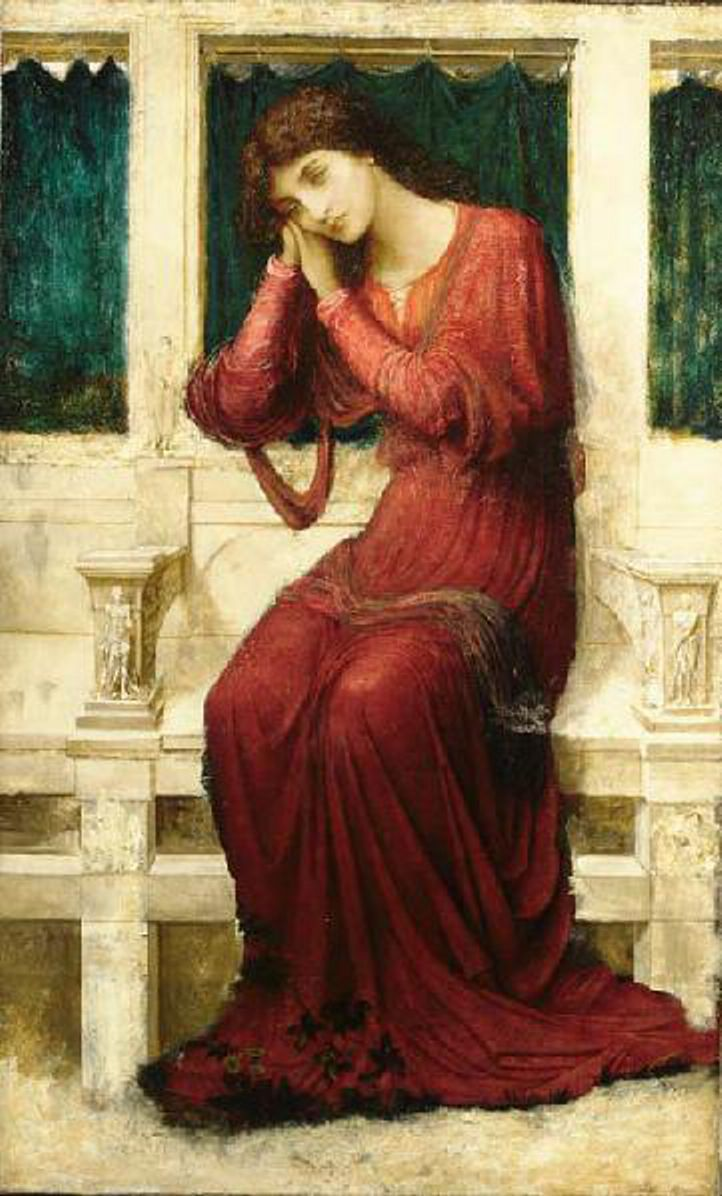
When Sorrow comes to Summerday, Roses bloom in Vain
circa 1910
