= Clara Taylor =

New Zealand-British chemist and educator

Clara Millicent Taylor (12 December 1885 – 10 January 1940) was a research chemist and educator from New Zealand.

== Biography ==
Clara Taylor was born in Stratford, Taranaki. She was one of seven children of Robert Taylor, a farmer from England, and his New Zealand-born wife Mary, née Morrison. One of her siblings was Lyra Taylor, who became a lawyer in Australia. Another sister, Portia, became a doctor in England, and Taylor's only brother became a barrister. Three other siblings died in infancy.

Taylor attended Ngaere School and Stratford District High School, where she was dux of the school. In 1899, while at high school, she won one of six Queen's Scholarships, but was too young to leave high school within the two-year time period specified. The scholarship was worth £40 per year for five years. In 1904, while at Victoria College, Wellington (now Victoria University of Wellington), she applied to have her scholarship extended. Taylor studied chemistry at Victoria College from 1902 to 1910, graduating with a M.A. (Hons) in chemistry. In 1908, Taylor was the only student at Victoria College to apply for a government research scholarship worth £100 per year plus laboratory fees. She stated that she would be researching 'The Utilisation of Fats'. Professors Harry Kirk and Thomas H. Easterfield supported Taylor's nomination for the scholarship.

Taylor trained as a teacher in Wellington, then taught at Chilton House, a private girls' school in the city, and at public schools.

Taylor moved to England in 1911 to undertake research at Newnham College, Cambridge, working with William Jackson Pope. In 1912 she became a science teacher at Clapham High School. For eight years (1913–1921) she was senior science mistress at St Paul’s Girls’ School, London. She was headmistress of Northampton School for Girls for 5 years (1921–1926) before becoming headmistress of Redland High School, Bristol from 1926 to 1940. In 1930, she and her sister Portia Thomas collaborated to write a school textbook on chemistry.

She was president of the Association of Women Science Teachers, 1925–26, and vice-president for 1927.

She died suddenly on 10 January 1940, at her sister Portia's house in Yorkshire. Former students of Redland High School set up a memorial fund in Taylor's name, to provide a small grant for students leaving the school to begin a career.

== Publications ==
=== Articles ===
- Taylor, Clara M. (1909). The phases of sulphur. Reports of the AAAS, 12, 158-159.
- Easterfield T. H. & Taylor C. M. (1911). The preparation of the ketones of the higher fatty acids. J. Chem. Soc. Trans 2298–2307.
- Taylor C. M. (1912). The rotatory powers of the d-and l-methylethylphenacylthetine salts. J. Chem. Soc. Trans 1124–1127.
- Pope W. J. & Taylor C. M. (1913). Cxc.—the resolution of 2 : 3-diphenyl-2 : 3-dihydro-1 : 3 : 4-naphthaisotriazine into optically active components. J. Chem. Soc. Trans 1763–1767.

=== Books ===
- Taylor C. M. (1923). The discovery of the nature of the air and of its changes during breathing. G. Bell and Sons.
- Taylor C. M. & Thomas P. K. (1930). Elementary chemistry for students of hygiene and housecraft (1st ed.). John Murray.
