= St Paul's Girls' School =

Girls' school in Hammersmith, London

Coordinates: 51.4951°N 0.2188°W

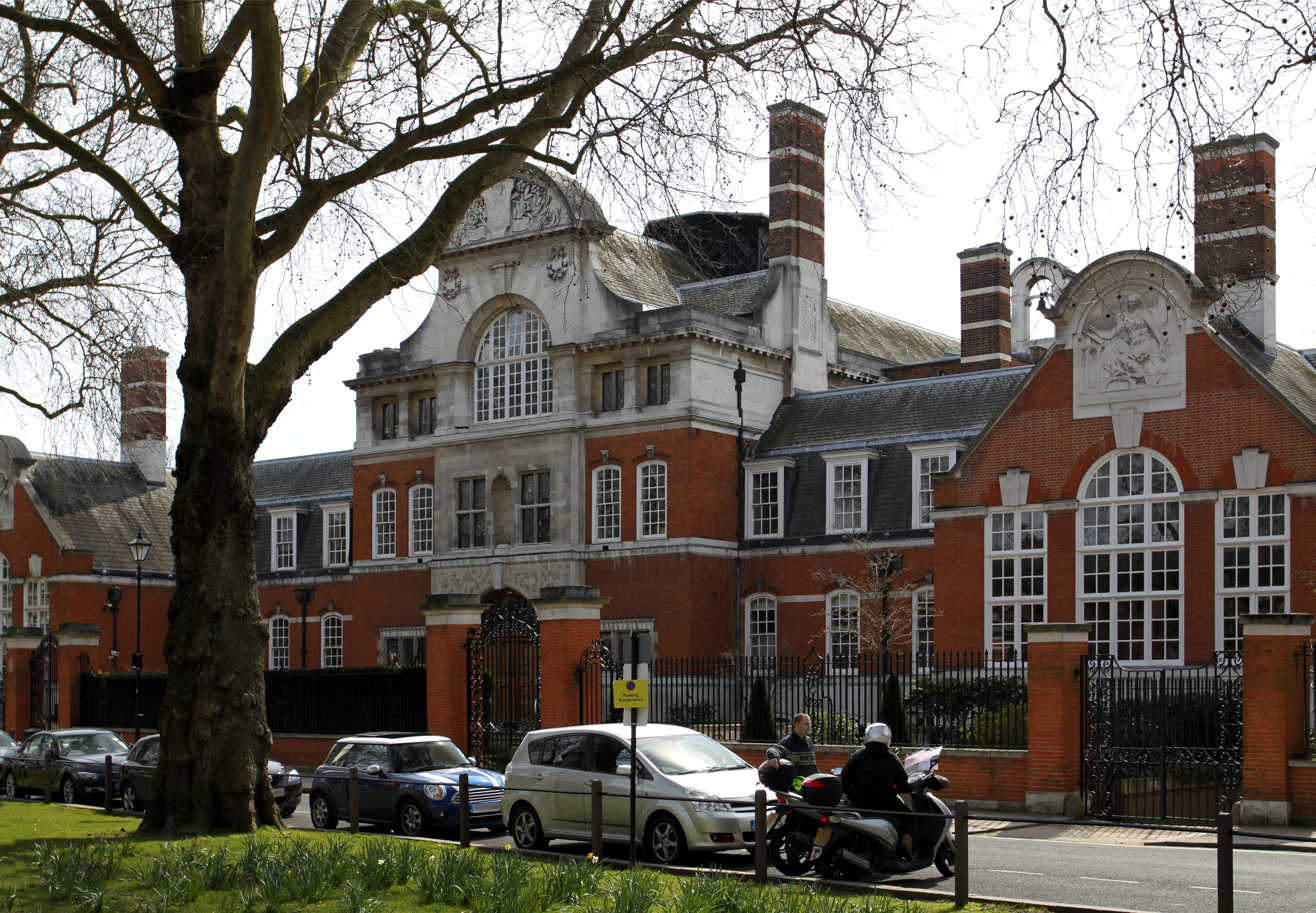

Location
- Brook Green; London, W6 7BS; England

Information
- Type: Private day school
- Established: 1904
- Founder: Worshipful Company of Mercers
- Local authority: Hammersmith and Fulham
- Department for Education URN: 100366 Tables
- Chairman of Governors: Simon Wathen
- High Mistress: Liz Hewer
- Gender: Girls
- Age: 10 to 19
- Enrolment: 808 As of 2023
- Capacity: 825 As of 2023
- Alumnae: Old Paulinas
- Website: spgs.org

St Paul's Girls' School is a private day school for girls, aged 11 to 18, in Brook Green, Hammersmith, in West London, England.

The school is included in The Schools Index as one of the world's 150 best private schools and among top 30 UK senior schools. In 2025 SPGS was named the London Independent School of the Year for Academic Excellence and the Independent School of the Year by Academic Excellence by The Sunday Times.

== History ==
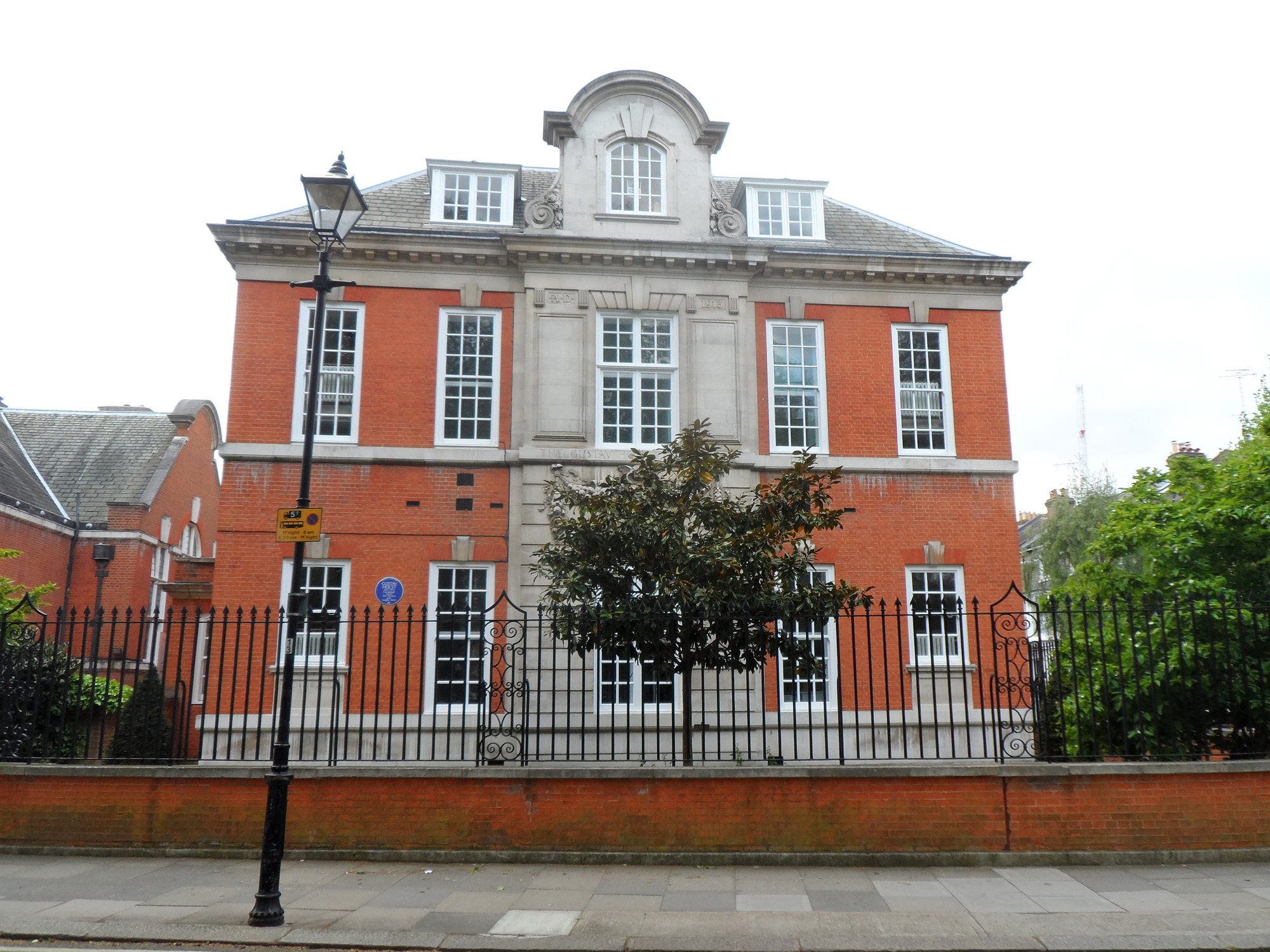
One of the main buildings of the school, in the Brook Green area

St Paul's Girls' School was founded by the Worshipful Company of Mercers in 1904, using part of the endowment of the foundation set up by John Colet, to create a girls' school to complement the boys' school he had founded in the sixteenth century. The governors hold proprietorial responsibility, and some are representatives of the Universities of Oxford, Cambridge and London.

The buildings for the school were designed by the architect Gerald Horsley, son of the painter John Callcott Horsley and one of the founder members of the Art Workers Guild.

The school has had several distinguished directors of music, most notably Gustav Holst (1905–34) and Herbert Howells (1936–62). Holst composed his St Paul's and Brook Green suites for the pupils at the school. Holst also composed what is arguably his best known work, The Planets, while teaching at St Paul's. John Linton Gardner held a part-time position as director of music at the school.

== Exam results ==
St Paul's girls regularly perform extremely well in the GCSEs and A Levels. In 2014, 99.3% of GCSEs were graded at A*s or As with 93.6% graded at A* alone. This was the highest ever A* percentage achieved by the school and in the country. In 2016, the school achieved the highest A Level results in its history with 60.0% of entries achieving an A* grade and 93.8% of entries achieving A* or A grades.

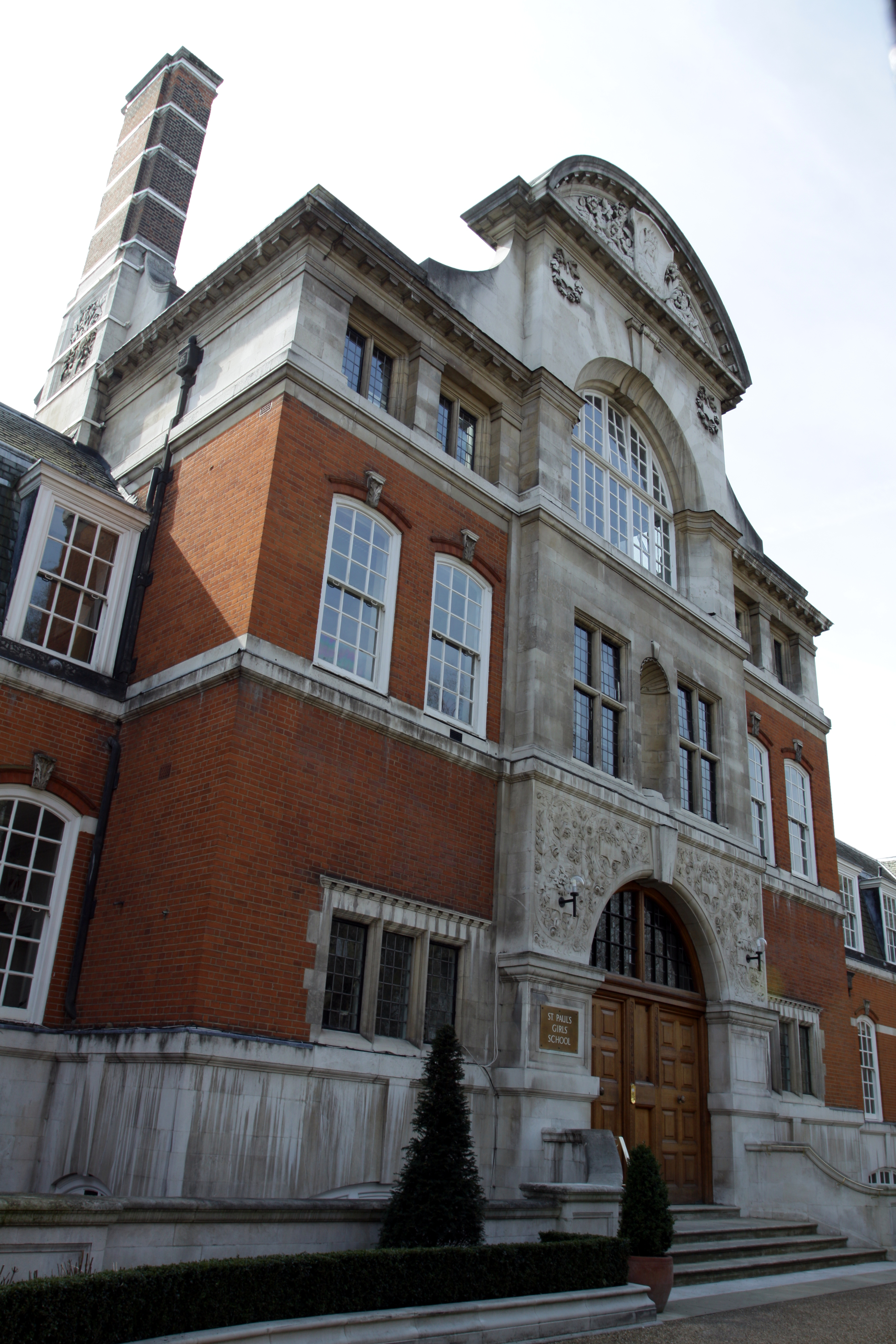
Detail of main building of the school

In 2023, 80.5% of GCSE entries were awarded a 9 grade and 94% of entries gained an 8 or 9 (which are equivalent to the old A* grade). This is the eleventh consecutive year that the proportion of A* equivalent grades has exceeded 90%.

In the 2023 A level and Pre-U results, 53% of entries attained an A* grade (or the Pre-U equivalent D1 or D2). 87.04% of entries achieved an A* or A grade and 97.1% a B grade or higher (or the Pre-U equivalent of M1 or M2).

== Music ==
Gustav Holst was director of music at the school from 1905 to 1934, when he died, including the period he composed his orchestral suites, including the St Paul's Suite and The Planets. He was succeeded by Herbert Howells before John Gardner followed in the 1960s. Gardner wrote many memorable pieces for the school, including his popular Christmas carols Tomorrow Shall Be My Dancing Day and The Holly and the Ivy. Hilary Davan Wetton was director of music from 1979 to 1994. In 1988 a CD with Children's favourite songs was released on the Spectrum record label.

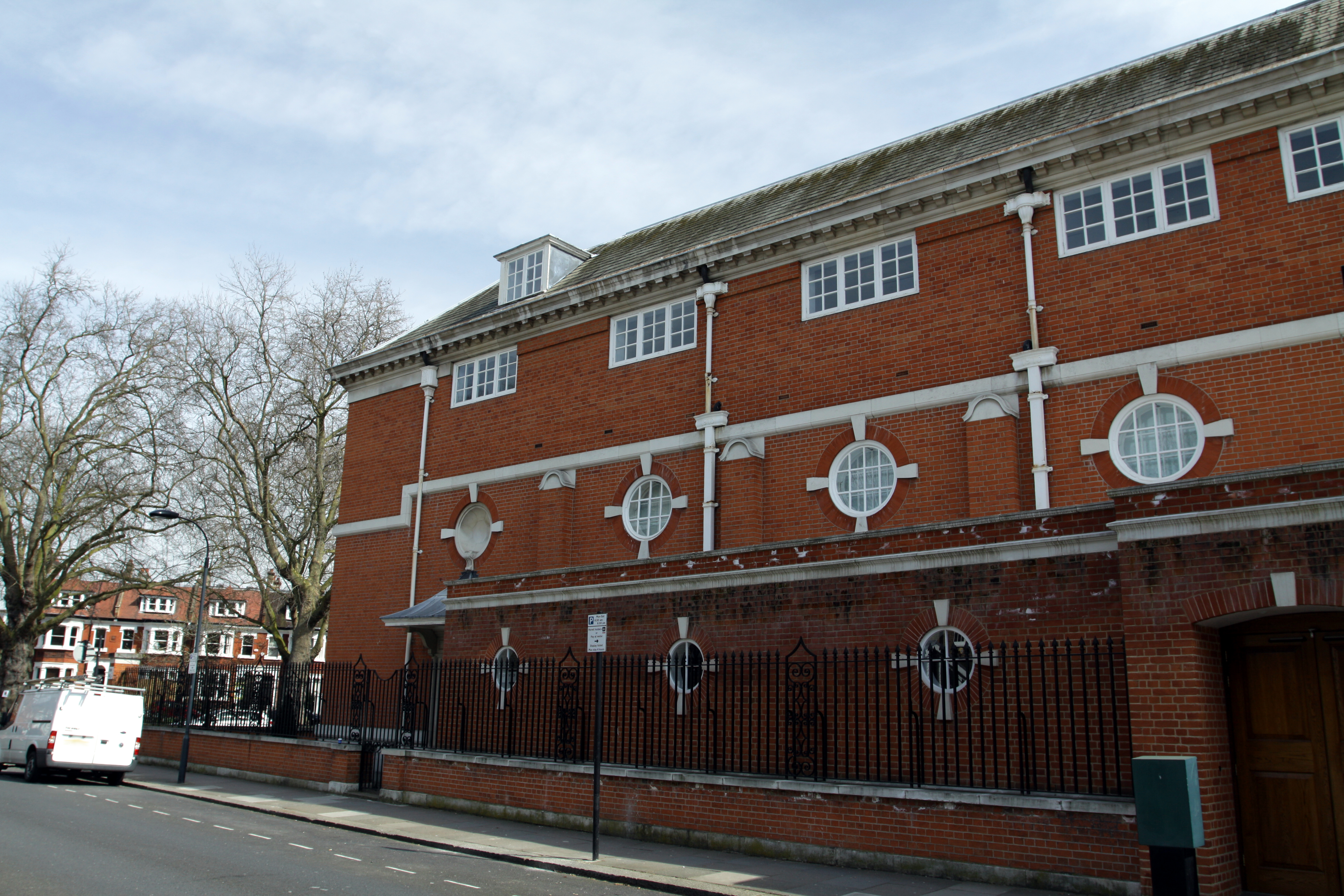
Side view of school buildings from Rowan Road

== Sport ==
=== Rowing ===
The school has an active rowing club called the St Paul's Girls' School Boat Club which is based on the River Thames. The club is affiliated to British Rowing (boat code SPG) and has produced four British champion crews at the 1992 British Rowing Championships, 2002 British Rowing Championships, 2003 British Rowing Championships and 2011 British Rowing Championships.

== High Mistresses ==
The headmistress of St Paul's Girls' School is known as the High Mistress.

- Frances Ralph Grey (d.1935), High Mistress 1903–1927
- Ethel Strudwick (1880–1954), High Mistress 1927–1948, daughter of the Pre-Raphaelite painter John Melhuish Strudwick
- Margaret Osborn (1906–1985), High Mistress 1948–1963
- Alison Munro (1914–2008), High Mistress 1964–1974
- Heather Brigstocke, Baroness Brigstocke (1929–2004), High Mistress 1974–1989
- Helen Elizabeth Webber Williams (born 1938), High Mistress 1989–1992
- Janet Gough (born 1940), High Mistress 1993–1998
- Elizabeth Mary Diggory (1945–2007), High Mistress 1998–2006
- Clarissa Mary Farr (born 1958), High Mistress 2006–2017
- Sarah Fletcher, High Mistress 2017–2025
- Liz Hewer, High Mistress 2025-present

== Alumnae ==
Alumnae of the school, known as "Old Paulinas", include:

=== Arts ===
- Gillian Ayres – artist
- Mischa Barton – actress
- Nicola Beauman – publisher, founder of Persephone Books
- Helen Binyon – artist
- Lesley Blanch – author
- Justin Blanco White – architect
- Celia Brayfield – author
- Sophie Hunter – theatre and opera director
- Brigid Brophy – dramatist
- Lucy Briers – actress
- Margaret Calvert – graphic artist
- Miranda Carter – biographer
- Edie Campbell – model
- Cecilia Chancellor – model
- Pippa Cleary – composer and lyricist
- Joan Cross – singer
- Emma Darwin – author
- Monica Dickens – author
- Suzi Digby – conductor and musician
- Flora Fraser – author
- Justine Frischmann – retired musician and artist
- Gluck (Hannah Gluckstein) – artist
- Francesca Gonshaw – actress
- Imogen Holst – musician
- Sarah Hobson – travel writer
- Ursula Howells – actress
- Grace Hughes-Hallett – documentary filmmaker
- Celia Johnson – actress
- Rachel Johnson – journalist and editor
- Jane M. Joseph – musician and composer
- Amy Key Clarke – poet and author
- Marghanita Laski – author
- Nicola LeFanu – composer
- Amanda Levete – architect
- Alice Lowe – actress/author
- Jessica Mann – author
- Yvonne Mitchell – actress/author
- Emily Mortimer – actress
- Lucy Moss - playwright/director
- Santha Rama Rau – author
- Joely Richardson – actress
- Natasha Richardson – actress
- Georgina Rylance – actress
- Katherine Shonfield – architect
- Dodie Smith – playwright
- Catherine Storr – author
- Imogen Stubbs – actress
- Emma Tennant – author
- Angela Thirkell – author
- Mary Treadgold – author
- Salley Vickers – author
- Samantha Weinberg – author
- Rachel Weisz – actress
- Antonia White – author

=== Business ===
- Grace Beverley – founder of Tala and Shreddy
- Isabel dos Santos – wealthiest woman in Africa as of 2020
- Amanda Thirsk – former private secretary to Prince Andrew, Duke of York

=== Culinary arts ===
- Thomasina Miers – chef and founder of Wahaca restaurant chain
- Henrietta Lovell – founder of the Rare Tea Company

=== Education ===
- Eleanora Carus-Wilson – economic historian
- Sheila Forbes – former principal, St Hilda's College, Oxford
- Henrietta Harrison – professor of Modern Chinese Studies, University of Oxford
- Jessica Rawson – warden, Merton College, Oxford
- Barbara Reynolds – scholar
- Joan Robinson – economist

=== Humanitarianism ===
- Myrtle Solomon – pacifist and former chair War Resisters' International
- Ruth Wyner – homeless charity director

=== Law ===
- Sonia Proudman – High Court Judge

=== Journalism and media ===
- Emily Buchanan – BBC World Affairs correspondent
- Clemency Burton-Hill – broadcaster and author
- Edie Campbell – model and socialite
- Victoria Coren Mitchell – presenter, poker player
- Daisy Donovan – TV presenter
- Stephanie Flanders – BBC Economics editor
- Amelia Gentleman – journalist
- Bridget Harrison – journalist
- Bronwen Maddox – senior journalist at 'The Times' newspaper
- Veronica Pedrosa – Al Jazeera English correspondent
- Sophie Raworth – news reader
- Susanna Reid – news presenter
- Anne Scott-James – journalist and editor
- Alexandra Shulman – editor-in-chief, Vogue 1992–2017
- Carol Thatcher – journalist
- Erica Wagner – author, critic, and literary editor of The Times
- Eirene White, Baroness White – journalist and Labour politician
- Petronella Wyatt – journalist

=== Politics ===
- Jane Bonham Carter – Liberal Democrat peer
- Vicky Ford, Conservative MP and formerly MEP
- Harriet Harman – Labour MP, former Acting Leader of the Labour Party, former Leader of the Opposition and former Cabinet minister
- Susan Kramer – former Liberal Democrat MP
- Mavis Tate – Conservative MP and women's rights campaigner
- Anne-Marie Trevelyan, Conservative MP
- Jo Valentine, Baroness Valentine – member of the British House of Lords
- Eirene White, Baroness White – Labour Minister of State then life peer
- Shirley Williams – former Labour Education Secretary and co-founder of the Social Democratic Party

=== Science ===
- Kate Bingham – venture capitalist
- Ruth Bowden – anatomist
- Caroline Deys – doctor
- Rosalind Franklin – scientist, whose research led to discovery of the structure of DNA
- Jean Ginsburg – physiologist, endocrinologist
- Christine Hamill – mathematician
- Kathleen Kenyon – archaeologist
- Irene Manton – botanist
- Sidnie Manton – entomologist
- Onora O'Neill – philosopher
- Cecilia Payne-Gaposchkin – astronomer
- Catherine Peckham – doctor and scientist
- Joan Beauchamp Procter – zoologist, herpetologist

=== Sport ===
- Kitty Godfree – tennis player
- Lara Prior-Palmer – equestrian
- Cecilia Robinson – cricket
- Zoe de Toledo – rowing

== Notable former staff ==
- Margaret Cole – socialist politician, former Classics teacher
- Gustav Holst – composer, pioneer of music education for girls 1905-1934
- Nicola LeFanu – director of music during the 1970s
- Clara Taylor – chemist and science teacher 1913-1921

== Controversy ==
The school was in the news in November 2017 with allegations of sexual abuse between the 1970s and 1990s. One teacher resigned on 22 November 2017 amidst these allegations.

In 2018, the school was criticised for holding an event called "Austerity Day", wherein pupils were served a simple lunch of baked beans and potatoes to create awareness for those less fortunate. The event was described as tone-deaf and patronising, especially considering the high fees of the school.
