= Sheila Forbes =

British educator, consultant and manager (born 1946)

Sheila Mary Forbes CBE (born 31 December 1946), is a British educator, consultant and manager. She was principal of St Hilda's College, Oxford, from 2007 to 2014.

Forbes was born in Dorset, grew up in Wargrave near Henley, attended St Paul's Girls' School in London and received her B.A. in History from St Hilda's College, Oxford, in 1969. She has studied at the London School of Economics and at the University of Bath. She spent 25 years working in human resources, joining Philips Electronics in 1970 and becoming head of personnel at Unigate plc in 1980. In 1988 she became an executive director at Storehouse plc, and finished her corporate career at Reed Elsevier, where she was human resources director from 1992 to 1996. Since leaving Reed Elsevier she has been a consultant and non-executive director for several large companies. From 1994 to 2000 she was a non-executive director for Lloyds TSB and is currently a non-executive director for OCS Group and Tribal Group plc.

She has also held a number of government, private, and public appointments, including Civil Service Commissioner, Chair of the Board of Governors of Thames Valley University, Chair of the Board of the Institute for Employment Studies and board member of the British Library and the Crafts Council.

In 2002 she was awarded the CBE for services to women in the workforce.
