= Financial services in Gibraltar =

Financial services in Gibraltar refers to the services provided in the British Overseas Territory of Gibraltar by the finance industry: banks, investment banks, insurance companies, credit card companies, consumer finance companies, government-sponsored enterprises, and stock brokerages.

== Regulation ==
Financial institutions operating in Gibraltar are regulated by the Gibraltar Financial Services Commission.

== Services ==
Gibraltar licensed or authorised financial institutions are able to provide services to customers in the United Kingdom through the Gibraltar Authorisation Regime which treats them as authorised persons under the UK Financial Services and Market Act 2000.

Prior to Brexit on 31 January 2020, Gibraltar was a constituent part of the European Union as a Special Member State territory, having joined the European Economic Community with the United Kingdom in 1973, under the provisions of the Treaty of Rome relating to European dependent territories. However, it was exempt from the Common external tariff, the Common Agricultural Policy and the requirement to levy Value added tax.

Subject to notifying the Gibraltar Financial Services Commission, which had to be satisfied that they meet certain criteria in accordance with the relevant EU Directive, Gibraltar licensed or authorised financial institutions were able to provide services throughout the EU and European Economic Area without having to seek separate licences or authorisation in the host Member State. This was known as the passporting of financial services.

Referred to as an International Finance Centre, Gibraltar was among 35 jurisdictions identified by the Organisation for Economic Co-operation and Development (OECD) as a tax haven in June 2000. However, the list's disclaimer stated:

That list should be seen in its historical context and as an evaluation by OECD member countries at a particular point in time of which countries met the criteria set out in the 1998 Report, Harmful Tax Competition: An Emerging Global Issue. More than five years have passed since the publication of the OECD list contained in the 2000 Report and positive changes have occurred in individual countries' transparency and exchange of information laws and practices since that time. The list has not been updated to reflect such changes.

As a result of having made a commitment in accordance with the OECD's 2001 Progress Report on the OECD's Project on Harmful Tax Practices, Gibraltar is not included in the OECD's list of uncooperative tax havens. It has also never been listed on the FATF Blacklist of uncooperative countries in the fight against money laundering. It may be referred to as an offshore financial centre, by international institutions such as the International Monetary Fund (IMF).

However, in its April 2009 progress report, the OECD listed Gibraltar in the list of jurisdictions which, although committed, had not yet "substantially implemented" the internationally agreed tax standard. Following Gibraltar's signing of 12 additional Tax Information Exchange Agreements (TIEAs), as of October 2009, with jurisdictions including the UK, US and Germany, to sum 13, Gibraltar is currently listed in the OECD "white list", and is considered a jurisdiction that has substantially implemented the tax standard. It therefore shares the same status as OECD member states such as the UK, the US, Spain or Germany.

Fiscal advantages, including no tax on capital income, are offered to a maximum of 8,464 offshore qualified companies incorporated in Gibraltar. After an agreement with the European Union in 2005, this tax exempt regime was due to disappear on 31 December 2010.

A 2007 IMF report on the regulatory environment and anti–money laundering again endorsed Gibraltar's robust regulatory environment.

According to the report:

Gibraltar has a well-regulated financial sector. The Gibraltar authorities are concerned with protecting the reputation and integrity of Gibraltar as a financial center, and are cognizant of the importance of adopting and applying international regulatory standards and best supervisory practices. Gibraltar has a good reputation internationally for cooperation and information sharing.

In 2008 Gibraltar was listed for the first time in the Global Financial Centres Index published by the City of London Corporation. The Rock was ranked 26th in a list of 69 leading finance centres around the world based on an online survey of 1,236 business professionals, who provided a total of 18,878 assessments. In the most recent GFCI report of 2011, Gibraltar was ranked 63rd in the world, and 8th of the leading offshore financial centres (OFCs).

Gibraltar was also ranked in the top 20 centres for e-readiness, coming 20th after major capitals and leading offshore centres.

== See also ==
- Economy of Gibraltar
- List of banks in Gibraltar
