= Sarah Hobson =

British travel writer

- Born: April 17, 1947 (age 79); England
- Education: St Paul's Girls' School, London
- Occupations: Travel writer; television documentary maker; international development specialist
- Writing career
- Genre: travel
- Notable work: Through Persia in Disguise

Sarah Hobson (born 17 April 1947) is the British author of two travel books, Through Iran in Disguise and Family Web: A Story of India, as well as being editor of a book series on Religion, Science and the Environment. She has presented and produced many documentary films for British television. She was founder of and advisor to Open Channels, which focuses its funding on rural women creating change in West Africa, and has seen first-hand, for more than 30 years, the impact of agriculture and aid policies on rural communities in many parts of Africa. Now a resident of the US, she has been executive director of the New Field Foundation.

== Early life ==
Hobson was born on 17 April 1947 to John Hobson, a lawyer and member of parliament, and Beryl Marjorie Johnson, who had won the junior doubles tennis tournament at the Wimbledon Championships and was the daughter of a successful factory owner. As a child, Hobson lived in Northamptonshire. Hobson described her education as erratic in quality and quantity, being in six schools in twelve years. She eventually graduated from St. Paul's Girls' School, in London but did not go to university.

From an early age, Hobson was interested in the wider world. At 17, she stayed in a Russian Orthodox Church Convent in the West Bank, helping Palestinian orphans learn English. At the age of 19, she travelled and worked for 18 months in Kenya and Zimbabwe. When she was 20, her father died unexpectedly and she returned to England and began working for the educational publisher, Edward Arnold.

== Career ==
In the 1970s and 1980s Hobson travelled widely, researching books, and working on television programmes. Her first book was Through Persia in Disguise, in which she recorded her travels alone in Iran disguised as a boy. This was followed by Family Web: A story of India, which she researched while living in a small South Indian village with a family of twenty-six, while researching a film. Hobson's television programmes involved working with a variety of British organizations, including David Paradine Productions, a company set up by David Frost, the BBC, Channel 4 and ITV Yorkshire.

Later, she would work with several international organizations, NGOs and academic institutes, including the International Fund for Agricultural Development (IFAD), UNICEF, the Global Fund for Women, and the Institute of Development Studies at the University of Sussex. Together with such organizations she published several books on topics as diverse as the causes of famine, child abuse and communications for rural development. She was also the founder and trustee of Open Channels, a British nonprofit organization working with indigenous peoples in Africa to define their lands, resources, and rights.

Moving to California, from 2003 to 2015, Hobson was executive director of New Field Foundation, which supports rural women's food sovereignty in Africa. She has also been executive director of the West Marin Fund, and a senior fellow at the Oakland Institute.

== Travel writing ==
- Hobson, Sarah (1 January 1973). Through Persia in Disguise (First ed.). Transatlantic Arts. ISBN 978-0719529115.
- Hobson, Sarah (1 January 1982). Family Web: A Story of India (First (US) ed.). Chicago: Academy Chicago Publishers. ISBN 978-0897330497.
