= Myrtle Solomon =

British pacifist (1921–1987)

Myrtle Solomon (9 June 1921 – 22 April 1987) was a British pacifist. She was general secretary of the Peace Pledge Union (PPU), a British pacifist organisation, between 1965 and 1972, and chair of the War Resisters International (WRI) between 1975 and 1986.

== Early life ==
Solomon was born in Kensington, London, the third of five children of fairly liberal and affluent Jewish parents. Her father was a solicitor, while her mother came from the family that ran the Lewis's store in Manchester. Before the Second World War her parents played an important role in helping Jewish refugees escape from Germany and Austria.

Solomon attended St Paul's Girls' School but left at the age of 16. In the Second World War she worked for a year with the Women's Voluntary Service driving a mobile canteen. Not yet a pacifist she then worked in an armaments factory. This experience turned her into a feminist. Women doing skilled work were being paid less than men who swept the floors. Another issue that concerned her at the time was the British nationality law where a British man could pass his nationality to his wife but a British woman could not make her husband British.

== Feminism ==
After the war Myrtle Solomon joined a group called “Women for Westminster” that campaigned on feminist issues and it was here she met Sybil Morrison, a fellow lesbian, who was an active pacifist and a member of the Peace Pledge Union: “I admired her very much and learned a lot from her, and it seemed quite natural to me to become a pacifist then.” They became close friends and were living together at the time of Morrison's death in 1984.

== Pacifism ==
Solomon began working for the PPU in 1957 as organiser for the London area. General Secretary 1965–1972, she was credited with reinvigorating the PPU after it lost members to the Campaign for Nuclear Disarmament in the late 1950s and early 1960s. She represented the PPU on the War Resisters International for six years and in 1975 was elected Chair of the WRI, an election she modestly attributed to the fact that she was a woman. But, as with the PPU, WRI was close to collapse and Solomon played an important role in rescuing it, for a time living in the building in Brussels where the WRI offices were situated.

A highlight of Solomon's tenure at WRI was a speech she made to the United Nations Conference on Disarmament in 1982, including the following observation: “Talk of disarmament has become a mythical ritual - a strange macabre dance of millions of words - but the weapons are never put down. To justify a totally illusory need, a whole new language has been invented by a sick society dominated by its weaponry.”

Myrtle Solomon was also a Trustee of the Lansbury House Trust Fund (LHTF). She bequeathed money to LHTF for the establishment of the Myrtle Solomon Memorial Fund to compile, publish and maintain an international survey on compulsory military service and on provisions for conscientious objection.

== See also ==
- List of peace activists
