= Gibraltar Financial Services Commission =

Financial supervisory authority

The Gibraltar Financial Services Commission (GFSC) is the financial supervisory authority in Gibraltar.

== Overview ==
The GFSC was established by the Gibraltar Financial Services Commission Act in 1989, and started operations in 1991. Later legislation include the Financial Services Act 2019 which, as of mid-2026, forms the legal basis for the GFSC.

The commission, or board, has eight members including its chief executive officer (ex officio) and its chairman.

The GFSC supervises auditors, banks, company managers, e-money institutions, professional trustees, payment service providers, funds and fund service providers, insurance companies, managers and intermediaries, investment firms, insolvency practitioners and DLT firms.

== Leadership ==
The roles of chairman and CEO were separated in 2007.

=== Commissioner & Chairman ===
- John Millner, 1994-1998
- Martin Fuggle, 1998-2003
- Marcus Killick, 2003-2007

=== Chief Executive Officer ===
- Marcus Killick, 2007-2014
- Samantha Barrass, 2014-2019
- Kerry Blight, since 2019

=== Chairman ===
- Brian Hilton, 2007-2011
- Alan Whiting, 2011-2014
- John Tattersall, 2014-2016
- Jonathan Spencer, 2016-2020
- Stephen Haddrill, since 2020

== See also ==
- Financial services in Gibraltar
- List of financial supervisory authorities by country
