= Lyra Taylor =

New Zealand lawyer and social worker

Lyra Taylor OBE
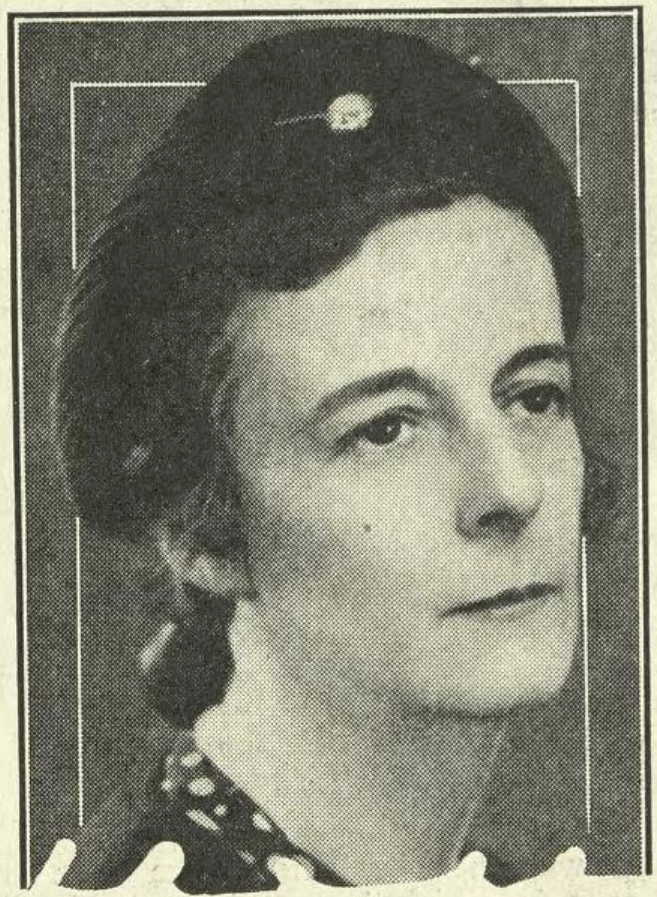
- Lyra Taylor, 1940
- Born: 11 July 1894; Stratford, New Zealand
- Died: 23 March 1979 (aged 84); Richmond, Victoria, Australia
- Education: Victoria University College; Johns Hopkins University
- Occupations: Social worker; Lawyer
- Employers: Family Welfare Agency of Baltimore; Family Welfare Association, Montreal; Australian Commonwealth Department of Social Services
- Title: General secretary of Young Women's Christian Association, Sydney; Assistant director of Old People's Welfare Council of Victoria; National Old People's Welfare Council of Australia (Australian Council on the Ageing from 1968); Acting-director of Western Australian Council on the Ageing
- Board member of: New South Wales Council of Social Service (1940-42); Board of social studies, University of Sydney (1940-44); Board of social studies, University of Melbourne

Lyra Veronica Esmeralda Taylor OBE (11 July 1894 – 23 March 1979) was a New Zealand lawyer and social worker. She spent much of her career in Australia.

Taylor was born on 11 July 1894 in Stratford, New Zealand. She was one of four children of Robert Taylor, a farmer from England, and his New Zealand-born wife Mary, née Morrison. One of her siblings was Clara Taylor, who became a science teacher in England. Another sister, Portia, became a doctor in England, and Taylor's only brother became a barrister.

Taylor studied law at the Victoria University of Wellington, and was "called to the bar" in 1918, the first woman to be a barrister in Wellington. In 1919, Taylor was made partner at a law firm which duly renamed itself as Kirk, Wilson, and Taylor.

In early 1940 Taylor was appointed general secretary of the Y.W.C.A. in New South Wales. In 1944 she started work with the Australian Department of Social Services. Taylor was sent on a 10 month study tour of England, Canada and the United States sponsored by the Carnegie Trust.

Taylor was a founding member of the Australian Association of Social Workers.

In the 1959 Queen's Birthday Honours, Taylor was appointed an Officer of the Order of the British Empire.
