= Sybil Morrison =

British pacifist and suffragette (1893–1984)

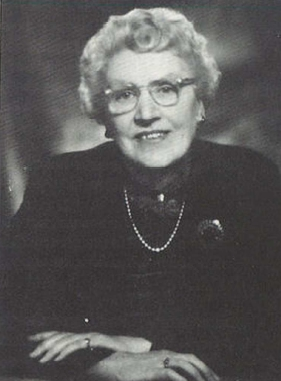
- Born: 2 January 1893
- Died: 26 April 1984 (aged 91)
- Organization(s): Peace Pledge Union; Six Point Group; Women's International League for Peace and Freedom; Howard League for Penal Reform; National Peace Council

Sybil Morrison (2 January 1893 – 26 April 1984) was a British pacifist and a suffragist who was active with several other radical causes.

== Formative years ==
Sybil May Morrison was born in 1893 to parents living in Sunderland Road, Forest Hill, Lewisham.

As a young and enthusiastic suffragist, Morrison (who had plans to go to Somerville College, Oxford) was persuaded by Emmeline Pankhurst that she was too young to go to prison. During World War I, she began in 1916 to drive ambulances in London and attributed her decision to become a pacifist to the sight of a Zeppelin being shot down over the town of Potters Bar: "In the streets of London, ordinary, decent people were clapping and cheering and dancing as though at a play or a circus.... I suddenly saw that war made yet another impact on human beings; it deprived them of their humanity. I became a pacifist then and nothing has happened since to alter my conviction that war is a crime against God and humanity".

== Peace Pledge Union ==
Morrison became in 1936 one of the first women members of the Peace Pledge Union (PPU), a British pacifist organisation, and the British section of War Resisters International (WRI). She served as a campaign organiser and chair and wrote the first history of the PPU. In 1940, she spent a month in Holloway Prison for having spoken against the war at London's Speakers' Corner.

Sybil Morrison was the secretary of the short-lived Women's Peace Campaign, set up by the PPU at the end of 1939. It had been hoped to obtain the signatures of one million women against the Second World War, but as Morrison admitted, "The invasion of Scandinavia has, of course, made it much more difficult now to approach people about signing an appeal for negotiations because opinion is hardening against the pacifist. The Campaign was doomed after the surrender of the French in June, 1940 but the collapse may also have had something to do with the opposition of John Middleton Murry, editor of Peace News. Murry was described as having a "frightful" attitude towards women and was not at all supportive of the campaign".

Morrison was the organising secretary and chair of the Six Point Group (c. 1948–1950). It campaigned for legislation on assault against children, on support for widows, on legislation in support of unmarried mothers and on issues of equal rights and equal pay. Another member of the group was Dora Russell, the second wife of Bertrand Russell. She was also chair of the British branch of the Women's International League for Peace and Freedom.

Morrison was also active with the Howard League for Penal Reform and the National Peace Council. She was a vice-president of the Fellowship Party, a small British political party that attracted many peace activists.

She was a close friend of the leading peace activists Donald Soper and Fenner Brockway and the pacifist actress Sybil Thorndike; they each referred to "the other Sybil". She was a lesbian who was once described as "the most famous dyke in London". For the last few years of her life, she shared a house with Myrtle Solomon, who was the general secretary of the Peace Pledge Union and later the chair of WRI. In the 1930s, she had a relationship with another suffragist, Dorothy Evans, which was considered shocking at the time.

Other people with whom Morrison worked included Vera Brittain, Alex Comfort, Laurence Housman, Hugh Brock and Kathleen Lonsdale and many other leading individuals in radical politics during much of the 20th century. Even towards the end of her life, she took an active interest in politics and turned up at the beginning of a march against the Falklands War.

== Oral History ==
Brian Harrison recorded an oral history interview with Morrison, in April 1975, as part of the Suffrage Interviews project, titled Oral evidence on the suffragette and suffragist movements: the Brian Harrison interviews. In this Morrison recalled her childhood and family relationships as well as her involvement with the WSPU, Six Point Group and Peace Pledge Union, and her prison experience. She also talked about many others involved in the suffrage campaign, including Emmeline Pankhurst, Dorothy Evans, Grace Roe, Teresa Billington-Greig, and Monica Whately.

== Publications ==
From 1938 until 1964, Morrison was a columnist in nearly 800 editions of the weekly Peace News, the official publication of the PPU. In 1954, she published Security Through Disarmament, a response to the foreign policy of 'Peace Through Strength', which she said often leads to war. In 1955, she published More Plain Words on War: Eight Reprinted Articles from Peace News, an anthology of some notable works on war. In 1962, she published I Renounce War: The Story of the Peace Pledge Union, a history of the organization.

== See also ==
- List of peace activists
