= Peace through strength =

Phrase that suggests that military power can help preserve peace

"Peace through strength" is a phrase and theory that a sufficiently strong military can preserve peace. The concept has long been associated with realpolitik and deterrence theory. The phrase probably originates with Neville Chamberlain who ran a 'Peace Through Strength' public relations campaign from 1936 to 1939 to avoid World War II; the phrase then gained currency during the Cold War, eventually becoming a core policy tenet of the Republican Party since 1980. The idea has critics, with the historian Andrew Bacevich stating, "'Peace through strength' easily enough becomes 'peace through war.'"

== History ==
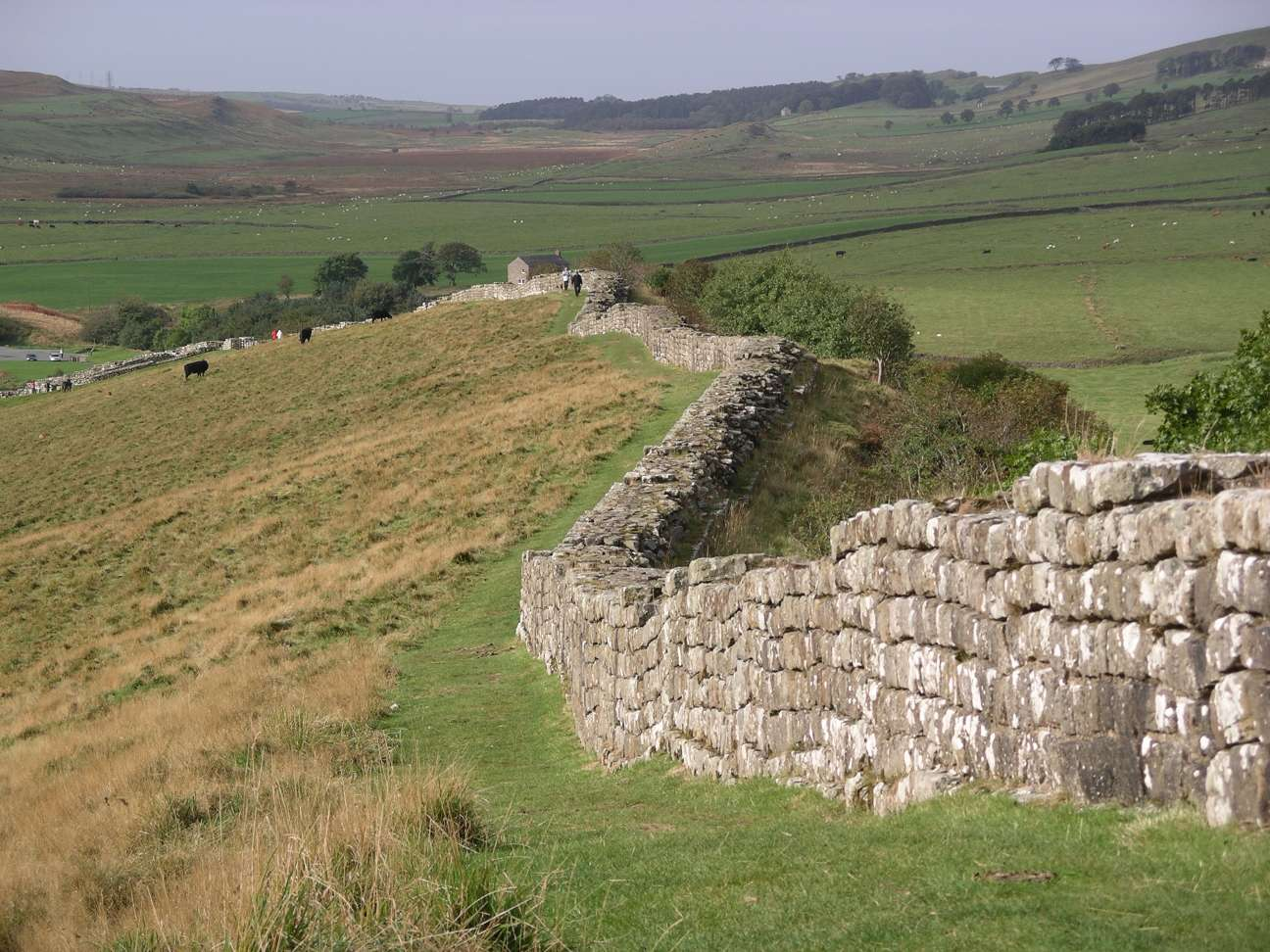
Hadrian's Wall in northern England, a fortification built to establish defensible borders and deter conflict, is a classical example of achieving peaceful relations through military preparedness.

=== Antecedents ===
While the phrase is modern in origin, Roman Emperor Hadrian (AD 76–138) applied the same principles. His policy was described in the 4th century AD Historia Augusta as "more desirous of peace than of war, he trained the army as if war were imminent." Hadrian's Wall was a symbol and manifestation of this policy. For these reasons modern writers have associated the concept of peace through strength with Hadrian, though he never used that exact phrase. In the 4th century AD, the Latin phrase Igitur qui desiderat pacem, praeparet bellum ("Therefore, whoever desires peace, let him prepare for war") was written by Vegetius in his De Re Militari; it is sometimes misquoted as Si vis pacem, para bellum ("If you want peace, prepare for war").

The first US president, George Washington, enunciated a policy of keeping the peace through military preparedness, in his fifth annual message to Congress, the 1793 State of the Union Address. He said "if we desire to secure peace, one of the most powerful instruments of our rising prosperity, it must be known that we are at all times ready for war."

=== United Kingdom ===
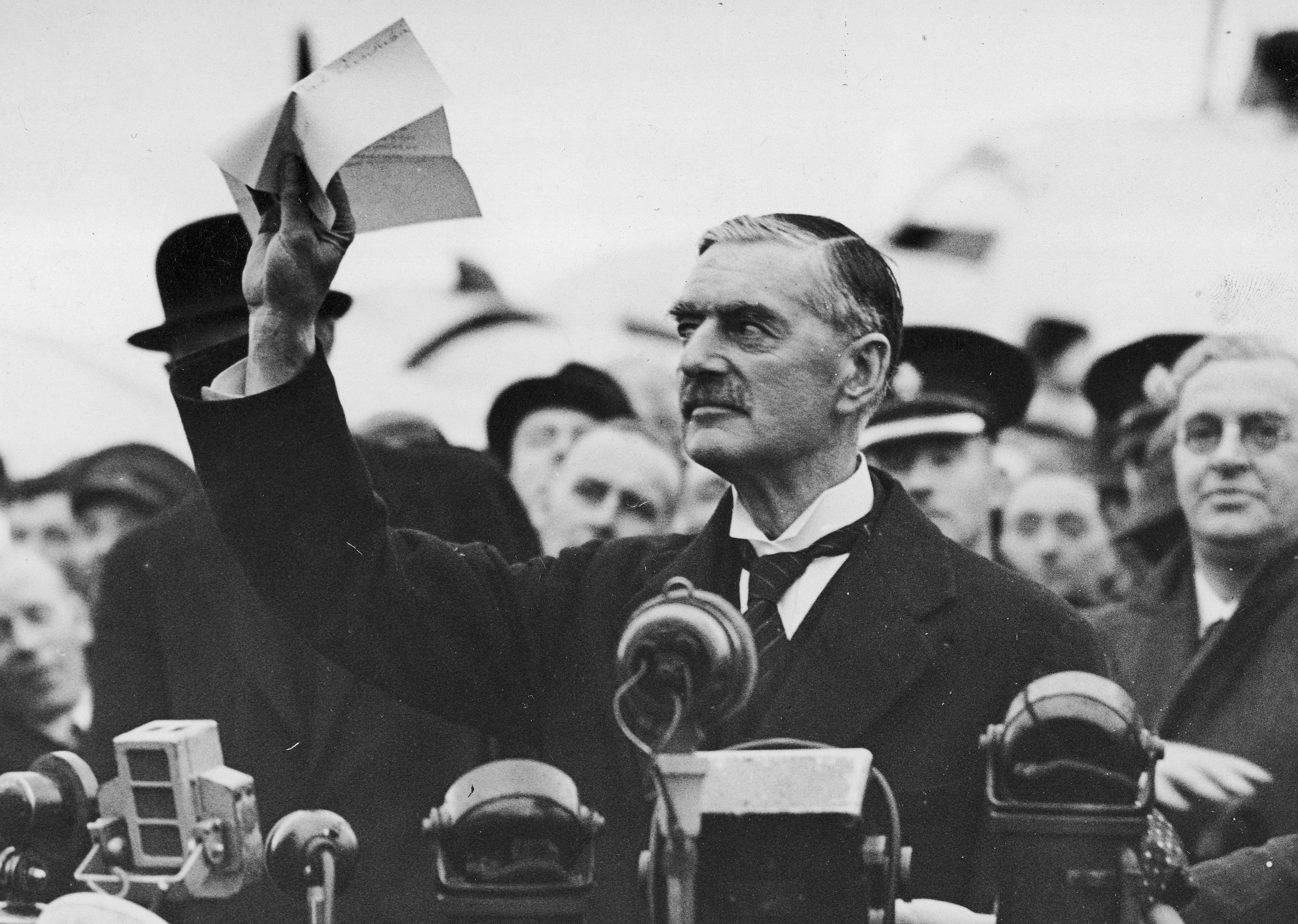
Prime Minister Neville Chamberlain in 1938 after the Munich Agreement. His policies, sometimes promoted with the "peace through strength" slogan, ultimately failed to prevent World War II.

"Peace through strength" was first used in the context of foreign policy in the United Kingdom in 1936, as a public relations campaign to promote the idea of mutual defence between Britain's colonies against the Axis powers – initially under the slogan "Peace through strength and unity in our empire." The campaign was launched by supporters of soon to be Prime Minister Neville Chamberlain on the birthday of his father, Joseph Chamberlain. Chamberlain expanded the policy underpinning the slogan to include recent allies Poland, Romania, and Greece. In February 1939, justifying a massive rearmament program, Chamberlain said British policy was "a policy of peace through strength". Chamberlain's foreign policies, as some historians argue, ultimately failed to prevent World War II. Nearly ninety years later, in 2025, Pime Minister Keir Starmer said the country is moving to "warfighting readiness" in order to show potential adversaries that the country is "ready to deliver peace through strength."

=== United States ===
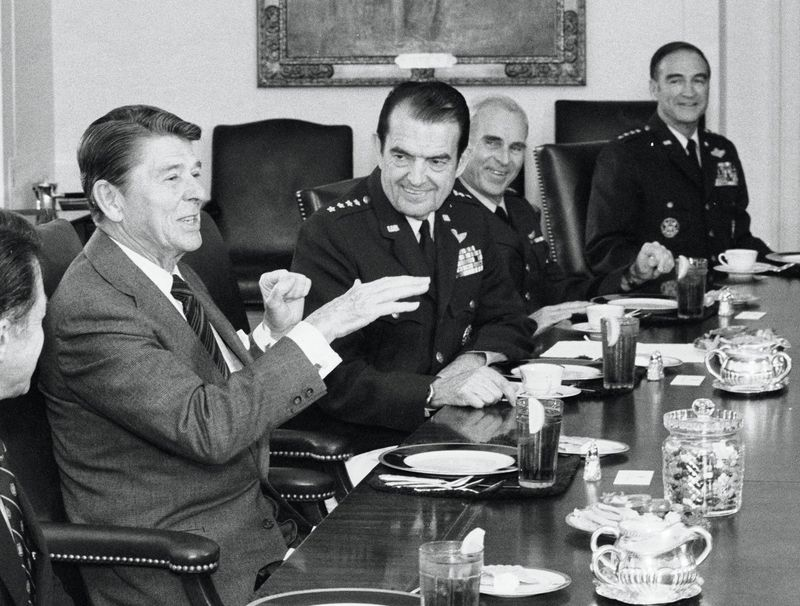
"Peace through Strength" has appeared in every Republican Party platform since 1980, starting with Ronald Reagan, here meeting with Joint Chiefs of Staff in 1982.

By late 1939, with the outbreak of World War II, some in the United States adopted the British slogan 'Peace through Strength' - Britain was no longer at peace, but the United States was, and peace through strength was a rallying cry for some isolationists who wanted to keep the US out of the war.

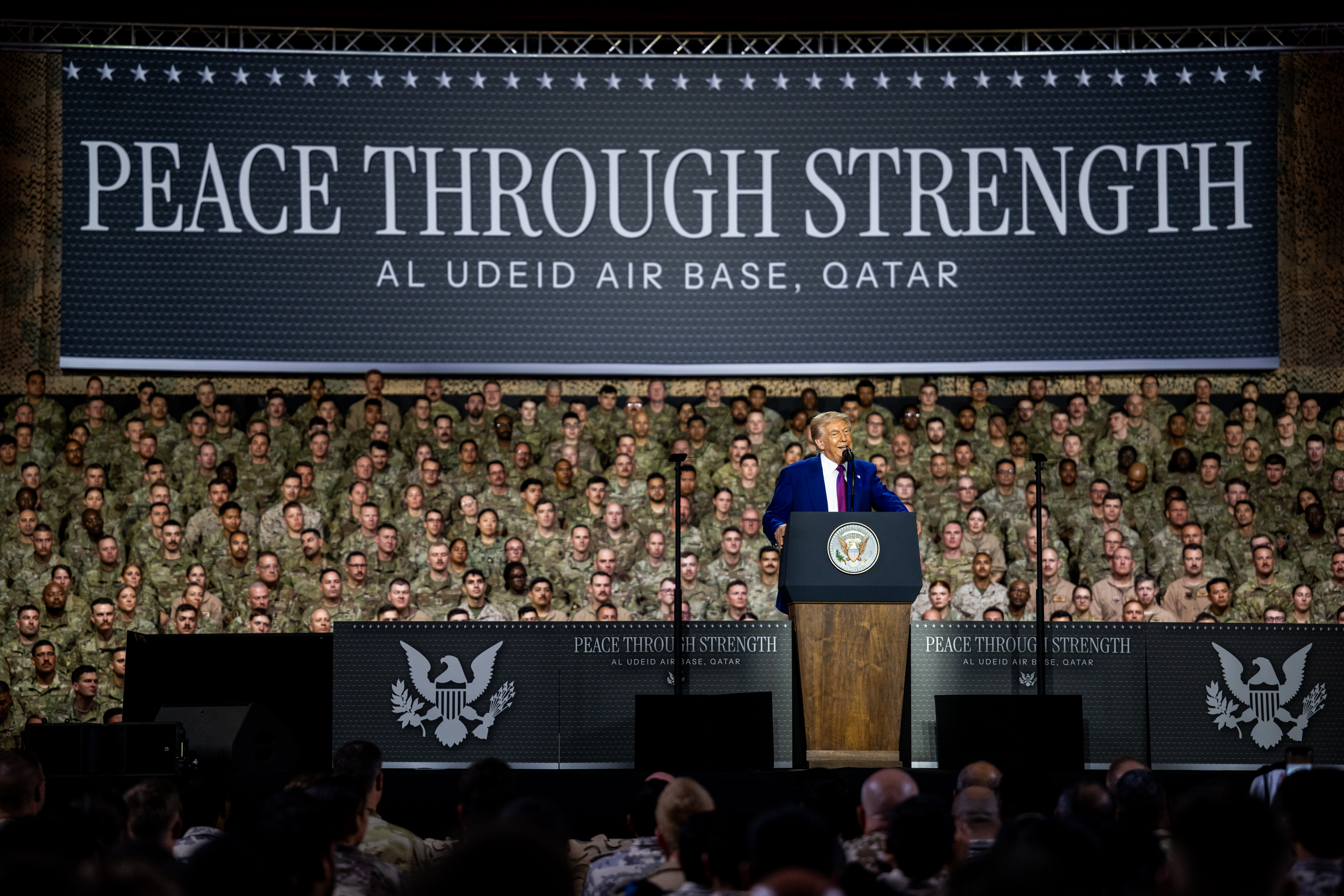
Donald Trump in front of a peace through strength banner

Following the war and with the rise of Cold War tensions, the phrase began having more currency in the USA. President Harry S. Truman said on 4 April 1951, that NATO represented a "force whose object is to maintain peace through strength." In 1952 there was published Peace Through Strength, a biography of Bernard Baruch, a World War II adviser to US President Franklin D. Roosevelt. Up until the early 1960s, it was used by military leaders, academics, and both Republicans and Democrats. The Pentagon strategist Fritz G. A. Kraemer (1908-2003) was a prominent advocate of the "peace through strength" doctrine. For decades, he promoted that approach and argued that a strong and credible military posture was essential to deter aggression and maintain peace.

During Barry Goldwater's 1964 presidential campaign, the Republican Party spent about $5 million on TV ads promoting Goldwater's foreign policy position of "Peace through Strength," making the phrase more broadly known to the public and associated with the Republican Party platform. President Richard Nixon sought to end the Vietnam War, a goal he called "Peace with Honor" by using the strategy of Peace through Strength, which included the application of military strength (eg. Operation Linebacker II), and diplomatic strength through the isolation of Vietnam from its allies China and Russia. After the war, President Gerald Ford was a bridge from Nixon's attempt to achieve Peace with Honor during wartime, to maintaining Peace Through Strength, a policy which Ford adopted in his 1977 State of the Union Address.

In 1980, Ronald Reagan, who had campaigned for Goldwater in 1964, used the phrase during his election challenge against Jimmy Carter by accusing the incumbent of weak, vacillating leadership that invited enemies to attack the United States and its allies. Reagan later considered it one of the mainstays of his foreign policy as president. "Peace Through Strength" has continued to appear in every Republican Party platform since 1980. "Peace Through Strength" is the official motto of the Nimitz-class nuclear-powered aircraft carrier, USS Ronald Reagan (CVN-76). President Donald Trump was a significant proponent of Peace Through Strength policy during both terms.

=== Other nations ===
In March 2025, French President Emmanuel Macron said, "This is the moment when our strategy of peace through strength comes into play," referring to an arms build-up in Europe, sanctions, and possible peace-keeping troops in Ukraine. He later said, "the approach of peace through strength [in Ukraine] is the one we're continuing to take."

In Taiwan, "peace through national defense" is a slogan of Taiwan’s 2019 Defenses White Paper, meaning to emphasize Taiwan's security, strengthen its military power, and work with the United States and Japan to guard against possible aggression by the People's Republic of China. Lai Ching-te, the eighth president of the Republic of China (Taiwan), emphasized "peace through strength" even before he became president. On 19 June 2024, President Lai reiterated that "peace must rely on strength, which is to say avoiding war by preparing for war to achieve peace".

== Criticism ==
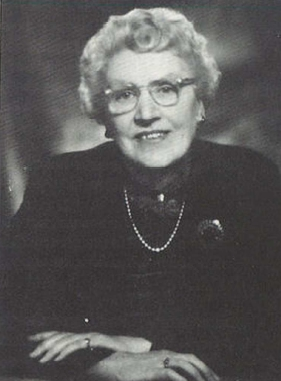
British pacifist Sybil Morrison spoke of the "utter futility of the 'peace through strength' theory" (1951).

Sybil Morrison said, "The utter futility of the 'peace through strength' theory .. by menacing the other side with dire consequences if they do not fall in with the proposals of the opposing side, is, ultimately, not peace, but war." She notes that if the rhetoric is defense plus defeating the enemy, this is war not peace, "victory and peace are not synonymous". Her counter-theory was published as Security Through Disarmament (1954).

Andrew Bacevich said "belief in the efficacy of military power almost inevitably breeds the temptation to put that power to work. 'Peace through strength' easily enough becomes 'peace through war.'"

The mock inversion "strength through peace" has been used on occasion to draw criticism to the militaristic system of diplomacy advocated by "peace through strength". Ohio Representative Dennis Kucinich adopted the slogan "Strength Through Peace" during his 2008 presidential run as part of his platform as a peace candidate against the Iraq War.

Senator Mark Hatfield delivered a strong criticism in his 2 August 1989 speech to the US Congress : Peace Through Strength is a Fallacy

== Trademark dispute ==
During Reagan's presidency, the non-profit American Security Council Foundation (ASCF) and its for-profit direct-mail provider, Communications Corporation of America, sought to influence United States foreign policy by promoting the idea, but after the Soviet collapse of 1991, ASCF fell into obscurity, and other organizations continued to promote the slogan. The Heritage Foundation and the Center for Security Policy (CSP) have also used the term in print. The ASCF registered a trademark for the phrase in April 2011. In September 2012, ASCF filed a trademark infringement lawsuit against CSP and Frank Gaffney, prompting the Washington City Paper to ridicule ASCF's Director of Operations, Gary James, for editing the online encyclopedia Wikipedia article titled 'Peace through strength' so that it was "drenched in ... ASCF references". Following a counterclaim by the CSP alleging that the trademark application had been fraudulent, in August 2013 the ACSF announced that it had settled the lawsuit with the CSP and would cancel its trademark claim.

== See also ==
- Big Stick ideology
- Collective security
- Doublethink in the 1949 novel Nineteen Eighty-Four, which features the phrase "war is peace"
- Might makes right
- Mutual assured destruction
- Pax Americana
- Reagan Doctrine
- Si vis pacem, para bellum
- Right of conquest
- World peace
- Security dilemma
