= Ethel Strudwick =

British headmistress (1880–1954)

Ethel Strudwick CBE (3 April 1880 – 15 August 1954) was a British headteacher and Liberal Party activist.

Strudwick was born in Fulham, the daughter of John and Harriet Strudwick, her father being a prominent Pre-Raphaelite artist. She was educated at Queen Elizabeth's School in West Kensington, then won a scholarship to Bedford College, London (now Royal Holloway, University of London), where she completed an honours degree in classics. She became a schoolteacher, teaching classics at the Laurels School in Rugby, but soon returned to Bedford College. There, she completed an MA, and taught classics, before becoming head of its Latin department.

Strudwick left the college in 1913, when she was appointed as headteacher of the City of London School for Girls. She ran the school through World War I, and after the war expanded the school's curriculum by building a physics laboratory, and encouraging pupils to undertake social work in south London. In 1921, she was also appointed to the Senate of the University of London.

In 1927, Strudwick beat 45 other candidates to be appointed as headteacher of St Paul's Girls' School. At the school, she again ordered more teaching space to be built for science, and she also taught some classes herself. During World War II, she arranged for the evacuation of many pupils to Wycombe Abbey School, but in May 1940, parents voted for the school to return to London. Despite the war, pupil numbers increased. During this period, Angela Brazil wrote a children's story set at the school; Strudwick strongly disapproved, denouncing the book in morning prayers, then collecting copies of the book from pupils to be burned.

Strudwick became increasingly involved with national bodies, serving as president of the Association of Headmistresses from 1931 to 1933, founding president of the British Federation of Business and Professional Women in 1937, and joined the council of the Girls' Public Day School Trust in 1948. In 1945, she sat on a government committee of inquiry into the future role of women in the foreign service, chosen because she was known not to hold strongly feminist views. In 1943, she was elected to the national council of the Liberal Party, and she was president of the Women's Liberal Federation for a year from 1949.

Strudwick was appointed an Officer of the Order of the British Empire in 1936, and a Commander in 1948. She retired that year.

Party political offices
Preceded by Eleanor Layton	President of the Women's Liberal Federation; 1949–1950	Succeeded by Doreen Gorsky
