= Bridget Harrison =

Bridget Harrison (born 22 February 1971) is a freelance journalist and Contributing Editor at the Times Magazine. She is also an editor on the Times T2 and Times Weekend sections. She was the deputy editor of The London Paper.

== Life ==
She was born in 1971. Harrison was educated at St Paul's Girls' School and Manchester University and she has an MSc. in Development Studies from the School of Oriental and African Studies.

She worked at the tabloid New York Post from 2000 to 2005 as a reporter, columnist and editor. Before this she was an assistant features editor at The Times.

Harrison was the deputy editor of The London Paper.

Her book Tabloid Love: Looking for Mr Right in All the Wrong Places chronicles her dating experience and the trials and tribulation as a 30-something single woman in New York City. The book is a memoir, although the names of characters in the book have been changed.

== Private life ==
In 2008 Harrison married Dimitri Doganis, MD of Raw Television, they have two sons named Herc and Lexi.
