= Institute for Employment Studies =

British research institute

Institute for Employment Studies (IES)
- Founded: 1969
- Headquarters: Brighton, United Kingdom
- Revenue: 3,825,198 pound sterling (2020)
- Number of employees: 42 (2020)
- Website: www.employment-studies.co.uk

The Institute for Employment Studies (IES) is a British centre of research and consultancy on human resources and employment.

The institute aims to "help bring about sustainable improvements in employment policy and human resource management."

Its headquarters is located in Brighton, United Kingdom.

== History ==
IES was established in 1969 on the campus of Sussex University, as the Institute of Manpower Studies. It was initially led by Sir Peter Allen, then deputy chairman of ICI, and Willis Jackson, Baron Jackson of Burnley.

In 1994, it was renamed to its current title. In 2009, it relocated to central Brighton.

== Key people ==
Its current chair of its board is Kathy Poole. Other notable members of its board include Dame Carol Black, Stephen Elliott from the Chemical Industries Association and Nusrat Hathiari of Workers Education Association.

Previous officeholders include Stephen Haddrill (2007–2011) and Sheila Forbes.

Other notable former council members include Brendan Barber.

As of 2025, the chief executive of the institute is Naomi Clayton, who succeeded Tony Wilson.
