= Emily Buchanan =

British journalist

Emily Margesson Buchanan is a British journalist who has worked for the BBC, in both radio and television.

== Early life ==
Born in Hammersmith, West London, Buchanan is the daughter of George Buchanan, a novelist and poet from Northern Ireland, and the Hon. Janet Margesson, whose father was David Margesson, 1st Viscount Margesson, a Conservative cabinet minister in the 1930s. Her mother, a manic depressive, committed suicide when Buchanan was nine. She was educated at the St. Paul's Girls' School, an independent school in Hammersmith. and read History, French and Spanish at the University of Sussex. After graduation, Buchanan studied for an MA in Radio Journalism from the City University London, which she received in 1982.

== Career ==
Buchanan began her career at the BBC in Bush House, then the base of the BBC World Service, where her first interview was with Desmond Tutu, and a few years later joined BBC Radio 4 to produce Stop Press, "a programme which went behind the scenes of the journalism trade". After a period producing The Week in Westminster, she joined BBC Television and worked for BBC 2's Assignment programme. During 1992, while working in Zimbabwe, Buchanan survived an accident when her plane crash-landed.

Her Assignment programmes won awards. "Let Her Die", a report about infanticide in India, won the Golden Nymph at the Monte-Carlo Television Festival, "The Disposables", about the killing of the poor and criminals in Colombia, was nominated for an Amnesty International UK Media Award and One World Media nominated a programme about the Grameen Bank in Bangladesh, which predominantly lends money to women. "The Baby Trade", also for Assignment, was about unscrupulous practices relating to international adoption in Paraguay. In "Seeds of Hate", for Radio 4, in November 2000, Buchanan spoke to some of the Muslim women who were raped during the Bosnian War.

Towards the end of 1994 she was appointed the corporation's BBC's Developing World Correspondent. Subsequently, she became the Religious Affairs Correspondent for three years, from around 1998 to 2001, and is now the BBC's World Affairs Correspondent.

As of late 2024, Buchanan sometimes presents the BBC Radio 4 programme Sunday.

== Adoption ==
After experiencing three miscarriages, Buchanan with her husband Gerald Slocock, explored the possibility of adopting children as their only means of having a family. As the couple wanted to adopt babies, abandoned children from other parts of the world emerged as practically their only option. In her book From China with Love: A Long Road to Motherhood (2005), she outlines the difficulties of the adoption service and discusses the issues relating to the adoption of children from an entirely different culture. She deals with what she sees as "fallacies" attached to the issue. The couple now have two Chinese-born daughters, the first adopted at the beginning of the century, and the second three years later. In her book, the extreme prejudice against baby girls, to a large degree a result of China's one-child policy, is also outlined.

Buchanan commented at the time her book came out that:

"There is an inverted racism in the social services, a preference for children to match the race of their parents [...] We're all supposed to be multi-cultural, all mixing in some great melting pot - but not in families. It doesn't feel right, it doesn't look right. It looks odd. [...] Part of why I wanted to write the book is to say I'm not ashamed of it. This is the way the world works now."
