= Peace Pledge Union =

Pacifist organisation in the UK

The Peace Pledge Union (PPU) is a non-governmental organisation that promotes pacifism, based in the United Kingdom. Its members are signatories to the following pledge: "War is a crime against humanity. I renounce war, and am therefore determined not to support any kind of war. I am also determined to work for the removal of all causes of war", and campaign to promote peaceful and nonviolent solutions to conflict. The PPU forms the British section of War Resisters' International.

== History ==
=== Formation ===
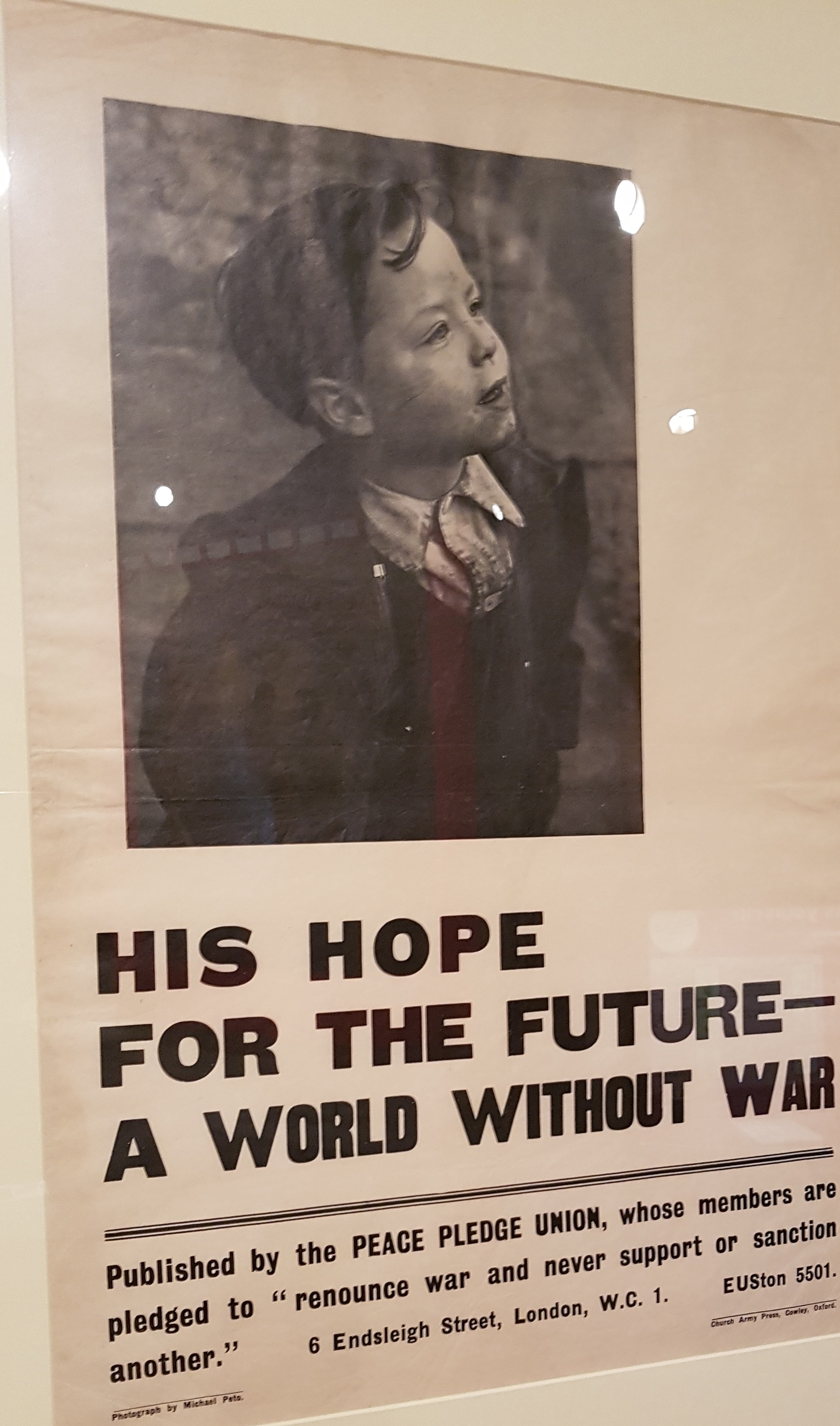
Peace Pledge Union poster

The PPU emerged from an initiative by Hugh Richard Lawrie 'Dick' Sheppard, canon of St Paul's Cathedral, in 1934, after he had published a letter in the Manchester Guardian and other newspapers, inviting men (but not women) to send him postcards pledging never to support war. 135,000 men responded and, with co-ordination by Sheppard, the Methodist Reverend John C. B. Myer, and others, formally became members. The initial male-only aspect of the pledge was aimed at countering the idea that only women were involved in the peace movement. In 1936 membership was opened to women, and the newly founded Peace News was adopted as the PPU's weekly newspaper. The PPU assembled several noted public figures as sponsors, including Aldous Huxley, Bertrand Russell, Storm Jameson, Rose Macaulay, Donald Soper, Siegfried Sassoon, Reginald Sorensen, J. D. Beresford, Ursula Roberts (who wrote under the pseudonym "Susan Miles") and Brigadier-General F. P. Crozier (a former army officer turned pacifist).

The PPU attracted members across the political spectrum, including Christian pacifists, socialists, anarchists and, in the words of member Derek Savage, "an amorphous mass of ordinary well-meaning but fluffy peace-lovers". The suffragist Sybil Morrison spoke to the historian Brian Harrison about her involvement with the Peace Pledge Union as part of the Suffrage Interviews project, titled Oral evidence on the suffragette and suffragist movements: the Brian Harrison interviews. In 1937 the No More War Movement formally merged with the PPU. George Lansbury, previously chair of the No More War Movement, became president of the PPU, holding the post until his death in 1940. In 1937 a group of clergy and laity led by Sheppard formed the Anglican Pacifist Fellowship as an Anglican complement to the non-sectarian PPU. The Union was associated with the Welsh group Heddwchwyr Cymru, founded by Gwynfor Evans. In March 1938, George Lansbury launched the PPU's first manifesto and peace campaign. The campaign argued that the idea of a war to defend democracy was a contradiction in terms and that "in a period of total war, democracy would be submerged under totalitarianism".

A large part of the PPU's work involved providing for the victims of war. Its members sponsored a house where 64 Basque children, refugees from the Spanish Civil War, were cared for. PPU archivist William Hetherington writes that "The PPU also encouraged members and groups to sponsor individual Jewish refugees from Germany, Austria and Czechoslovakia to enable them to be received into the United Kingdom".

In 1938 the PPU opposed legislation for air-raid precautions and in 1939 campaigned against military conscription.

=== Attitudes towards Nazi Germany ===
Like many in the 1930s, the PPU supported aspects of appeasement, with some members suggesting that Nazi Germany would cease its aggression if the territorial provisions of the Versailles Treaty were undone. It backed Neville Chamberlain's policy at Munich in 1938, regarding Hitler's claims on the Sudetenland as legitimate. At the time of the Munich crisis, several PPU sponsors tried to send "five thousand pacifists to the Sudetenland as a non-violent presence", however this attempt came to nothing.

Peace News editor and PPU sponsor John Middleton Murry and his supporters in the group caused considerable controversy by arguing Germany should be given control of parts of mainland Europe. In a PPU publication, Warmongers, Clive Bell said that Germany should be permitted to "absorb" France, Poland, the Low Countries and the Balkans. However, this was never the official policy of the PPU and the position quickly drew criticism from other PPU activists such as Vera Brittain and Andrew Stewart. Clive Bell left the PPU shortly afterwards and by 1940 he was supporting the war.

Some PPU supporters were so sympathetic to German grievances that PPU supporter Rose Macaulay claimed she found it difficult to distinguish between the PPU newspaper Peace News and that of the British Union of Fascists (BUF), saying, "occasionally when reading Peace News, I (and others) half think we have got hold of the Blackshirt [BUF journal] by mistake". There was Fascist infiltration of the PPU and MI5 kept an eye on the PPU's "small Fascist connections". After Dick Sheppard's death in October 1937, George Orwell, always hostile to pacifism, accused the PPU of "moral collapse" on the grounds that some members even joined the BUF. However, several historians note that the situation may have been the other way around; that is, BUF members attempted to infiltrate the PPU. On 11 August 1939, the Deputy Editor of Peace News, Andrew Stewart, criticised those "who think that membership of British Union, Sir Oswald Moseley's Fascist organization, is compatible with membership of the PPU". In November 1939, an MI5 officer reported that members of the far-right Nordic League were attempting "to join the PPU en masse".

Historians have differed in their interpretation of the PPU's attitude to Nazi Germany. The historian Mark Gilbert said, "it is hard to think of a British newspaper that was so consistent an apologist for Nazi Germany as Peace News," which "assiduously echoed the Nazi press's claims that far worse offences than the Kristallnacht events were a regular feature of British colonial rule". But David C. Lukowitz argues that, "it is nonsense to charge the PPU with pro-Nazi sentiments. From the outset it emphasised that its primary dedication was to world peace, to economic justice and racial equality," but it had "too much sympathy for the German position, often the product of ignorance and superficial thinking". Research by the historian Richard Griffiths, published in 2017, suggests considerable division and controversy at the top of the PPU, with the editors of Peace News being generally more willing to play down the dangers of Nazi Germany than were many members of the PPU Executive.

Controversy over the PPU's attitude towards Nazi Germany has continued ever since the war. In 1950, Rebecca West, in her book The Meaning of Treason, described the PPU as "that ambiguous organisation which in the name of peace was performing many actions certain to benefit Hitler". The publishers removed the phrase from subsequent editions of the book following representations by the PPU, but West refused to apologise.

=== Second World War ===
Initially, the Peace Pledge Union opposed the Second World War and continued to argue for a negotiated peace with Germany. On 9 March 1940, 2,000 people attended a PPU public meeting calling for a negotiated peace. PPU membership reached a peak of 140,000 in 1940.

For some members of the PPU, the focus was less on a negotiated peace and more on "nonviolent revolution" in both Britain and Germany. In 1940, the PPU published a booklet called Plan of Campaign, reprinting an article by the Dutch Christian anarcho-pacifist Bart de Ligt. He called for war to be made impossible by direct action, including "the most effective non-co-operation, boycott and sabotage". Not all PPU members were happy with this approach and the booklet was withdrawn from sale in London.

In February 1940, the Daily Mail newspaper called for the PPU to be banned. While the government decided not to ban the PPU, a number of PPU members faced arrest and prosecution for campaigning against war. In May 1940, six leading PPU activists—Alex Wood, Stuart Morris, Maurice Rowntree, John Barclay, Ronald Smith and Sidney Todd—were charged over the publication of a pacifist poster that was aimed at encouraging people of all nationalities to refuse to fight. The charge read out in court was that they "did endeavour to cause among persons in His Majesty's Service disaffection likely to lead to breaches of their duty". They were prosecuted by the Attorney-General, Donald Somervell KC. They were defended by John Platts-Mills and were convicted but not imprisoned. The PPU Council voted by a majority to withdraw the poster in question, although this seems to have been a controversial decision within the PPU. Other PPU members were also arrested, for holding open-air meetings during the war and selling Peace News in the street. In 1942, PPU General Secretary Stuart Morris was sentenced to nine months in prison for dealing with secret government documents relating to British rule in India, which he was alleged to have been planning to pass to Gandhi or others in the nonviolent wing of the Indian independence movement. The trial was held in secret. The PPU Council disassociated itself from Morris' actions.

The critical attitude towards the PPU in this period was summarised by George Orwell, writing in the October 1941 issue of Adelphi magazine: "Since pacifists have more freedom of action in countries where traces of democracy survive, pacifism can act more effectively against democracy than for it. Objectively, the pacifist is pro-Nazi".

Following the fall of France, support for the PPU dropped considerably and some former members even volunteered for the armed forces. The PPU abandoned the focus on peace negotiations. PPU members instead concentrated on activities such as supporting British conscientious objectors and supporting the Food Relief Campaign. A few members of the PPU joined the Bruderhof in the Cotswolds, which was seen as a radical peace experiment. This latter campaign attempted to supply food, under Red Cross supervision, to civilians in occupied Europe. From 1941, the PPU campaigned against the bombing of German civilians and was one of several groups to back the Bombing Restriction Committee (most of whose members were not pacifists or even opposed to the war as a whole). The Birmingham branch of the PPU declared, "We pacifists, while determined to resist the Nazi system, believe that nothing can justify the continuation of this slaughter and the moral degradation that it involves". Throughout the war, Vera Brittain published a newsletter, Letters to Peace Lovers, criticizing the conduct of the war, including the bombing of civilian areas of Germany. This had 2,000 subscribers.

By 1945, membership of the PPU had fallen by more than a quarter, standing at 98,414 when the war ended (compared to around 140,000 in 1940).

=== After the Second World War ===
Since 1945, the PPU has consistently "condemned the violence, oppression and weapons of all belligerents". Immediately after the war, there was a focus on support for famine relief in Europe and elsewhere. The PPU condemned the use of nuclear weapons against Japan in August 1945 and in October 1945; prominent PPU members were among the signatories to an open letter asking what the moral difference was between mass killing by Nazis in concentration camps and mass killings by atomic bombs in Hiroshima and Nagasaki. This was followed by the publication of the PPU leaflet Atom War. In 1947, the PPU voted to make a priority of campaigning for the abolition of conscription (known in law as National Service). Conscription in the UK was phased out from 1960 and ended completely in 1963.

In the 1950s, the PPU paid more attention to ideas of nonviolent civil disobedience, as developed by Mohandas Gandhi and others. This was not without controversy even within the PPU, with some members resigning as they objected to the use, or what they saw as the too frequent use, of methods of civil disobedience. However, members of PPU were well represented in the Direct Action Committee Against Nuclear War (DAC) founded in 1957, which organised the first of the Aldermaston marches in 1958. In practice, however, in the late 1950s and early 1960s, the PPU lost some members to the Campaign for Nuclear Disarmament, even though CND was not a pacifist-only organisation and, at least in its early days, was less focused on direct action.

Some recovery in the PPU's fortunes took place after 1965, when Myrtle Solomon was general secretary. The PPU organised protests against the US war in Vietnam and handed out leaflets to US tourists in Britain stating "not only are Vietnamese being killed, but American men are dying for a cause war cannot achieve". The PPU also opposed the Soviet invasion of Afghanistan and condemned both the Argentinian invasion of the Falklands and the British response. It has also promoted the ideas of pacifist thinkers such as Leo Tolstoy, Mahatma Gandhi, Martin Luther King Jr., and Richard B. Gregg.

The group had a branch in Northern Ireland, the Peace Pledge Union in Northern Ireland; in the 1970s this group campaigned for the withdrawal of the British army, as well as the disbandment of both Republican and Loyalist paramilitary groups.

The Peace Pledge Union's 21st-century activity has included taking part in British protests against the 2003 Iraq War. In 2005, the PPU released an educational CD-ROM on Martin Luther King's life and work that was adopted by several British schools. In recent years, the PPU has focused on issues including Remembrance Day, peace education, the commemoration of World War One and what they describe as the "militarisation" of British society.

== White poppy campaign ==
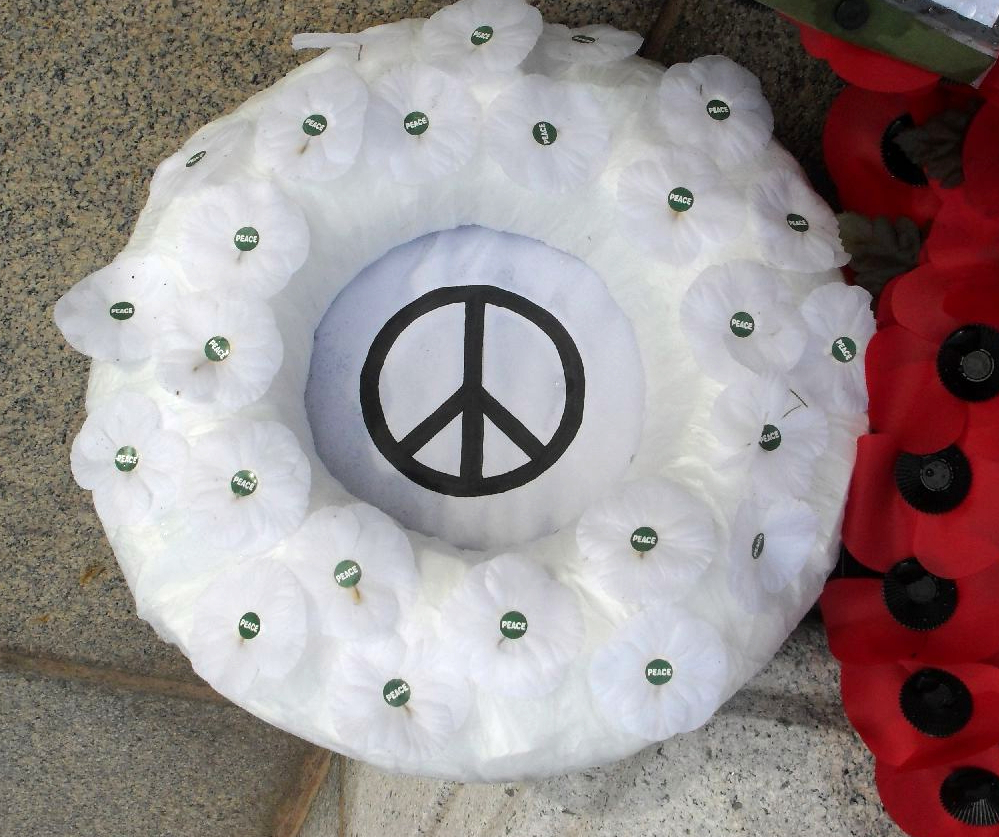
A Peace poppy wreath, made of Peace poppies, with a CND symbol inside at a British Remembrance Day event

The PPU's most visible contemporary activity is the White Poppy appeal, started in 1933 by the Women's Co-operative Guild alongside the Royal British Legion's red poppy appeal. The white poppy commemorated not only British soldiers killed in war, but also civilian victims on all sides, standing as "a pledge to peace that war must not happen again". In 1986, Prime Minister Margaret Thatcher expressed her "deep distaste" for the white poppies, on allegations that they potentially diverted donations from servicemen, yet this stance gave them increased publicity. In the 2010s, sales of white poppies rose. The PPU reported that around 110,000 white poppies had been bought in 2015, the highest number on record.

== Notable members ==
Members of the PPU have included: Vera Brittain, Benjamin Britten, Clifford Curzon, Alex Comfort, Eric Gill, Ben Greene, Laurence Housman, Aldous Huxley, George Lansbury, Kathleen Lonsdale, George MacLeod, Sybil Morrison, John Middleton Murry, Peter Pears, Max Plowman, Arthur Ponsonby, Hugh S. Roberton, Bertrand Russell, Siegfried Sassoon, Myrtle Solomon, Donald Soper, Reginald Sorensen, Donald Swann, Sybil Thorndike, Michael Tippett, and Wilfred Wellock.

== See also ==
- Conscience: Taxes for Peace not War
- List of anti-war organisations
- List of peace activists
- Parliament Square Peace Campaign
- Peace News
- Peace symbols
