= Stephen Haddrill =

- Education: New College, Oxford
- Employer: Financial Reporting Council

Stephen Haddrill was chief executive officer of the Financial Reporting Council (FRC) in the United Kingdom. In November 2018 he announced he would be leaving the post. In 2020 he became the chairman of the Gibraltar Financial Services Commission.

== Biography ==
Educated at Trinity School of John Whitgift from 1967 to 1974, Haddrill then studied history and economics at New College, Oxford. During the summer months his first taste of industry started with Findlay Durham & Brodie Electrical Ltd.

He joined the Department of Energy in 1978, where he worked principally on nuclear power, and rose to the rank of Principal Private Secretary to the Energy Minister.

From 1990 to 1994 he worked in Hong Kong as a member of the Governor's Central Policy Unit.

From 1994 until 2005, he had a succession of roles in the Department of Trade and Industry (DTI), as a director of the Competitiveness Unit, Director of Employment Relations, then in Consumer Affairs. In early 2002 he was appointed as Director General of the DTI's Fair Markets Group.

He succeeded Mary Francis as Director General of the Association of British Insurers (ABI) on 3 May 2005. In this role Haddrill took a close interest in accounting standards.

In October 2007, Haddrill was also appointed Vice-President and Chair of the Institute for Employment Studies, a leading employment and human resources body in the UK. He stood down from this role in 2011.

The Financial Reporting Council announced in May 2009 that Haddrill would succeed Paul Boyle as its Director General. Sir Christopher Hogg, chairman of the FRC, said Haddrill's experience at the ABI would 'enable him to bring a strong investor perspective to the work of the FRC.' He took up the post in November 2009.

In 2015 he became chair of the global RICS Regulatory Board.

Following criticisms of the FRC's role in overseeing auditors' work in the run-up to the January 2018 collapse of Carillion, in November 2018, it was announced that Haddrill was to quit as CEO of the FRC, and suggestions that his departure might lead to the body's abolition. There were also controversies surrounding the appointment of Haddrill’s wife Kate Marshall, to a BEIS team overseeing appointments to the FRC’s non-executive board. In March 2019, the government announced that the FRC would be replaced by a new regulator, the Audit, Reporting and Governance Authority, with enhanced powers, in an effort to "change the culture" of the accounting sector.

In December 2019 Haddrill became Director General of The Finance & Leasing Association (FLA).

== Financial Crisis Advisory Group (FCAG) ==
Haddrill who was the only UK representative on the Financial Crisis Advisory Group (FCAG)—created by the Financial Accounting Standards Board and the International Accounting Standards Board in 2008. The FCAG was an international group of standard-setting bodies—that coordinated responses "on the future of global standards in light of" the 2008 financial crisis. Just prior to the FCAG's report to the G20 in April 2009 meeting, and in reference to the political pressure placed on standards setters "to make changes to fair value accounting rules over suggestions that it exacerbated the financial crisis" Haddrill cautioned,

"Who do we want to set accounting standards? Not politicians, that's clear. But neither do we want experts vacuum-packed in a world of their own."

— Stephen Haddrill UK Financial Reporting Council

== Views ==
In his first interview after taking office at the FRC, Haddrill signalled a change of emphasis from his predecessor on the domination of the accounting profession by the Big Four auditors. He said that the FRC had looked at the level of competition, and increasing it by creating a fifth large player was not achievable in the near term; his priority was therefore maintaining high standards while also preparing for the possibility of another global firm collapsing.

He also criticised the effort to converge international accounting standards with American standards, saying that the focus should be on the quality of international standards. He has since also been critical of the European Commission's proposals to reform the audit market.
