= List of publishers of children's books =

This is a list of publishers of children's books. They may be independent or an imprint of a larger publisher. They may be currently operating or out of business.

Publisher	City	Administrative division	Country	Est.	Notable books, series, or franchises	Notes
Adarna House	Quezon City		Philippines	1980		
Affirm Press	Melbourne		Australia	2010		Began publishing children's books in 2017.
American Girl			United States	1986	American Girl series	Owned by Mattel
Annick Press	Toronto	Ontario	Canada	1975	Classic Robert Munsch series The Paper Bag Princess	
Anvil Publishing	Mandaluyong		Philippines	1990		
Arbordale Publishing	Mount Pleasant	South Carolina	United States	2004		Nonfiction topics include science, math, and folklore
Barefoot Books	Cambridge	Massachusetts	United States	1992		
Beaver's Pond Press	Saint Paul	Minnesota	United States	1998	Pockets of Joy by Roxane Battle Tell My Sons by Lt. Col. Mark M. Weber	
Bendon Publishing International	Ashland	Ohio	United States	2001		
Big Guy Books	Encinitas	California	United States			
Bloomsbury	London New York City New Delhi	England New York	United Kingdom United States India	1986	Harry Potter	
The Book House for Children				1919		Now defunct
Candlewick Press	Somerville	Massachusetts	United States	1991	Judy Moody and Stink franchises Guess How Much I Love You Where's Waldo? books Because of Winn-Dixie	Part of Walker Books Group Distributed by Penguin Random House Publishers Services
Capstone Publishers	Mankato	Minnesota	United States	1990		Imprints and divisions include Capstone Press, Compass Point Books, Picture Window Books, Stone Arch Books, Red Brick Learning, Capstone Digital, Heinemann-Raintree and Switch Press
Children's Press			United States	1945	Rookie Read-About series True Book series Young People's series (Young People's Animal Encyclopedia, Young People's Science Encyclopedia, Young People's Science Dictionary, Young People's World)	Spelled as Childrens Press until 1996. Originally based in Chicago, Illinois prior to its acquisition by Grolier in 1995 and has a secondary imprint, Franklin Watts. Became an imprint of Scholastic Corporation in 2000.
Chronicle Books	San Francisco	California	United States	1967	The Art of... series Olive, the Other Reindeer What's Your Poo Telling You?	
Cuento de Luz	Madrid		Spain	2007		
David Fickling Books	Oxford	England	United Kingdom		The Curious Incident of the Dog in the Night-time by Mark Haddon The Boy in the Striped Pyjamas by John Boyne	
DK (formerly Dorling Kindersley)	London	England	United Kingdom	1974		Division of Penguin Random House
Dutton Children's Books			United States	1852	Winnie-the-Pooh books Rumpelstiltskin by Paul O. Zelinsky Looking for Alaska by John Green	Division of Penguin Random House
Egmont Publishing	Copenhagen		Denmark	1878		
Eklavya foundation	Bhopal	Madhya Pradesh	India			
Enslow Publishing	Berkeley Heights	New Jersey	United States	1976		
Faber and Faber	London	England	United Kingdom	1929	Old Possum's Book of Practical Cats Lord of the Flies	
Figures In Motion	Bellingham	Washington	United States	2008	Famous Figures series	
Fremantle Press	Fremantle		Australia	1976	Destroying Avalon	
Gallimard Jeunesse	Paris		France			Subsidiary of Éditions Gallimard
Gecko Press	Wellington		New Zealand	2005	Duck, Death and the Tulip	
Golden Books	Racine	Wisconsin	United States			Defunct 2001 Little Golden Books remains as an imprint of Penguin Random House.
Goops Unlimited						
Grupo Novo Século	São Paulo		Brazil	2001		
HarperCollins	New York City	New York	United States United Kingdom	1989	Frog and Toad A Series of Unfortunate Events The Giving Tree Where the Sidewalk Ends Divergent	
Hogs Back Books	Guildford, Surrey	England	United Kingdom	2010	Boris the Boastful Frog	
J. Lumsden and Son		Scotland	United Kingdom	1783		
Just Us Books	West Orange	New Jersey	United States	1988	AFRO-BETS ABC Book	Independent publisher specializing in African American and multicultural children's books.
Kerala State Institute of Children's Literature		Kerala	India	1981		
Kids Can Press	Toronto	Ontario	Canada	1973		
Kim Đồng Publishing House	Hanoi		Vietnam	1957		
Ladybird Books	London	England	United Kingdom	1867		Imprint of Penguin Random House
Lee & Low Books	New York City	New York	United States	1991	Baseball Saved Us	
Lerner Publishing Group	Minneapolis	Minnesota	United States	1959	Unspeakable: The Tulsa Race Massacre Randolph Caldecott Medal Honor Book, Commended, 2022 Monkey with a Tool Belt, the inspiration behind Chico Bon Bon: Monkey with a Tool Belt Where I Belong Classified: The Secret Career of Mary Golda Ross, Cherokee Aerospace Engineer	Independently owned and operated since 1959 with 14 imprints including Kar-Ben Publishing and Graphic Universe
Mackinac Island Press						
Magabala Books	Broome		Australia	1987		
McLoughlin Brothers			United States	1858	Beverly Gray	Defunct 1920
Miles Kelly Publishing	Bardfield End Green, Essex	England	United Kingdom	1996		
Nosy Crow	London	England	United Kingdom	2010	Bizzy Bear Pip and Posy Peekaboo Where's Mr/Mrs...? Jasmine Green Zoe's Rescue Zoo Unicorn Academy: Where Magic Happens	Imprint of Candlewick Press
Orchard Books				1986		Orchard Books UK is maintained by Hachette. Hachette, which acquired Grolier in 1988, sold Grolier to Scholastic Corporation in 2000, along with the U.S. branch of Orchard Books, while retaining the UK branch.
Orion	London	England	United Kingdom	1998		
Peace Hill Press	Charles City	Virginia	United States		The Story of the World by Susan Wise Bauer	
Prometheus Books	Amherst	New York	United States	1969		
Purple House Press	Cynthiana	Kentucky	United States	2000		
The Quarto Group	London	England	United Kingdom	1976		Many imprints. Distribution by Hachette.
Random House	New York City	New York	United States	1927		
Roaring Brook Press						Imprint of Macmillan Children's Publishing Group
Salariya Book Company	Brighton	England	United Kingdom	1989		
Scholastic	New York City	New York	United States	1920	Clifford the Big Red Dog The Magic School Bus Goosebumps	
Simon & Schuster	New York City	New York	United States	1924		
Skyhorse Publishing						
Tamarind Books			United Kingdom	1987		Now an imprint of Random House Children's Books UK
Text Publishing	Melbourne		Australia	1990	Zac & Mia Watch Over Me	
Tu Books	New York City	New York	United States	2009	Summer of the Mariposas	Young adult and middle grade publishing imprint of Lee & Low Books
Tulika Publishers	Chennai	Tamil Nadu	India	1996		
Tundra Books	Toronto	Ontario	Canada	1967		
Usborne Publishing			United Kingdom	1973		
Walker Books	London	England	United Kingdom	1978	Where's Wally?	

== See also ==
- List of English language book publishers
- List of UK children's book publishers
