= List of UK children's book publishers =

This is a list of UK children's book publishers.

For UK children's authors, see Children's non-fiction authors.

== A ==
- Allen Lane
- Andersen Press
- Austin Macauley Publishers

== B ==
- Barefoot Books
- Barrington Stoke
- Blackie and Son Limited – ceased operation 1991
- Bloomsbury Publishing
- The Bodley Head
- Buster Books

== C ==
- Chicken House

== D ==
- Dorling Kindersley

== E ==
- Egmont Publishing
- Evans Brothers

== F ==
- Faber and Faber
- Frances Lincoln Children's Books

== G ==
- Girls Gone By Publishers

== H ==
- Hamish Hamilton
- HarperCollins
- Heinemann
- Hodder & Stoughton
- Hogs Back Books

== J ==
- Jonathan Cape
- The Juvenile Library, established 1805 by Mary Jane Clairmont and William Godwin

== L ==
- Ladybird Books
- Lion Hudson

== M ==
- Macmillan Publishers
- Michael O'Mara Books
- Miles Kelly Publishing

== N ==
- Nosy Crow

== O ==
- Orchard Books (imprint of Hachette UK)
- Orion Publishing Group
- Our Street Books (imprint of John Hunt Publishing)
- Oxford University Press

== P ==
- Parragon
- Puffin Books (division of Penguin Books)

== R ==
- Random House

== S ==
- Salariya Book Company
- Simon & Schuster

== T ==
- Templar Publishing (an imprint of Bonnier Group)
- Top That Publishing Ltd

== U ==
- Usborne Publishing

== W ==
- Walker Books Ltd
- Wells Gardner, Darton and Company - ceased operations c. 1985

== See also ==
- List of largest UK book publishers
- Books in the United Kingdom
- Book trade in the United Kingdom
