= Wells Gardner, Darton and Company =

British publishing company

- Wells Gardner, Darton & Co.'s distinctive "G-D" logo.
- Status: Defunct c. 1985
- Founded: 1859
- Founder: William Wells Gardner
- Country of origin: England
- Headquarters location: London
- Key people: Joseph William Darton, F. J. Harvey Darton
- Publication types: books, magazines, comics
- Nonfiction topics: Ecclesiology
- Fiction genres: Children's literature

Wells Gardner, Darton and Company was a British publishing company based in London. The company was founded by William Wells Gardner (1821–1880) in 1859 to produce mainly ecclesiastical texts; it later brought on as a partner Joseph William Darton (1844–1916), and branched out into magazines and children's literature. (Darton already had a publishing house founded by his ancestor William Darton in the 1780s which specialized in juvenile literature.)

Wells Gardner, Darton & Co. published books until the 1950s. Authors of children's books published by Gardner, Darton included Alice Corkran, F. J. Harvey Darton, Mrs. E. M. Field, John Masefield, Robert Hope Moncrieff, E. Nesbit, William Rainey, Francesca Maria Steele, and Enys Tregarthen. Authors of ecclesiastical texts included Herbert Bury, G. K. Chesterton, Joseph Clayton, Percy Dearmer, Hensley Henson, Alan George Sumner Gibson, Henry Twells, and James Charles Wall. Other authors published by the firm included Jill Allgood, E. Davenport Cleland, S. R. Crockett, Oliver Goldsmith, Katherine Purdon, and William Henry Macleod Read.

Co-founder Joseph William Darton's son F. J. Harvey Darton (1878–1936) joined the family firm in c. 1900, becoming a director in 1904. Darton edited the company's Chatterbox magazine from 1901 to 1931, as well as the company's The Prize magazine. Darton was behind the firm's publication of John Masefield's Martin Hyde in 1906; Masefield also contributed to Chatterbox. At the time, Wells Gardner, Darton & Co. published many compilations of older stories, including reissues of the chapbook The Seven Champions of Christendom (1901) and compilations of stories from Chaucer's The Canterbury Tales.

Chatterbox was published from 1901 to 1931, and The Prize magazine from 1910 to 1933. Harry Rountree illustrated for The Prize; The Brocks of Cambridge provided illustrations for both periodicals.

The firm was sold in 1928, with F. J. Dalton leaving the company shortly afterward. Illustrator Denis McLoughlin painted book covers for Gardner, Darton during World War II. In the 1950s, the company expanded its nonfiction list.

A later iteration of the company published comics in the period 1960–c. 1985, in partnership with Micron. Titles included Combat Picture Library, Conflict Libraries, Pop Pic Library, and Romantic Adventure Library.

== Magazines published (selected) ==
- Chatterbox (1901–1931)
- Mission Life
- The Prize (1910–1933)
- Sunday Reading for the Young (1888–1915)

== Book series ==
- Big Ben Books
- Big Ben Juveniles
- Chatterbox Library
- The Children's Poets
- Chosen Books
- Chosen Books Romance
- Chosen Books Sports
- Chosen Books Western
- Combat Picture Library
- Conflict Libraries
- Everyday Library
- The Fathers' and Sons' Library
- Florin Series
- Goodwill Series
- Laurel Series
- The Little Brown Books
- Little People Everywhere Series (also published by Little, Brown, Chicago)
- Midget Series
- The Modern How-It-Works Series
- The Modern World Series
- The National Churches
- Pop Pic Library (part of Big Ben Library)
- Romantic Adventure Story
- The Things We Wear
- The Treasure-House Series

== See also ==
- List of UK children's book publishers
