= Humfrey Gifford =

British poet

A Posie of Gilloflowers
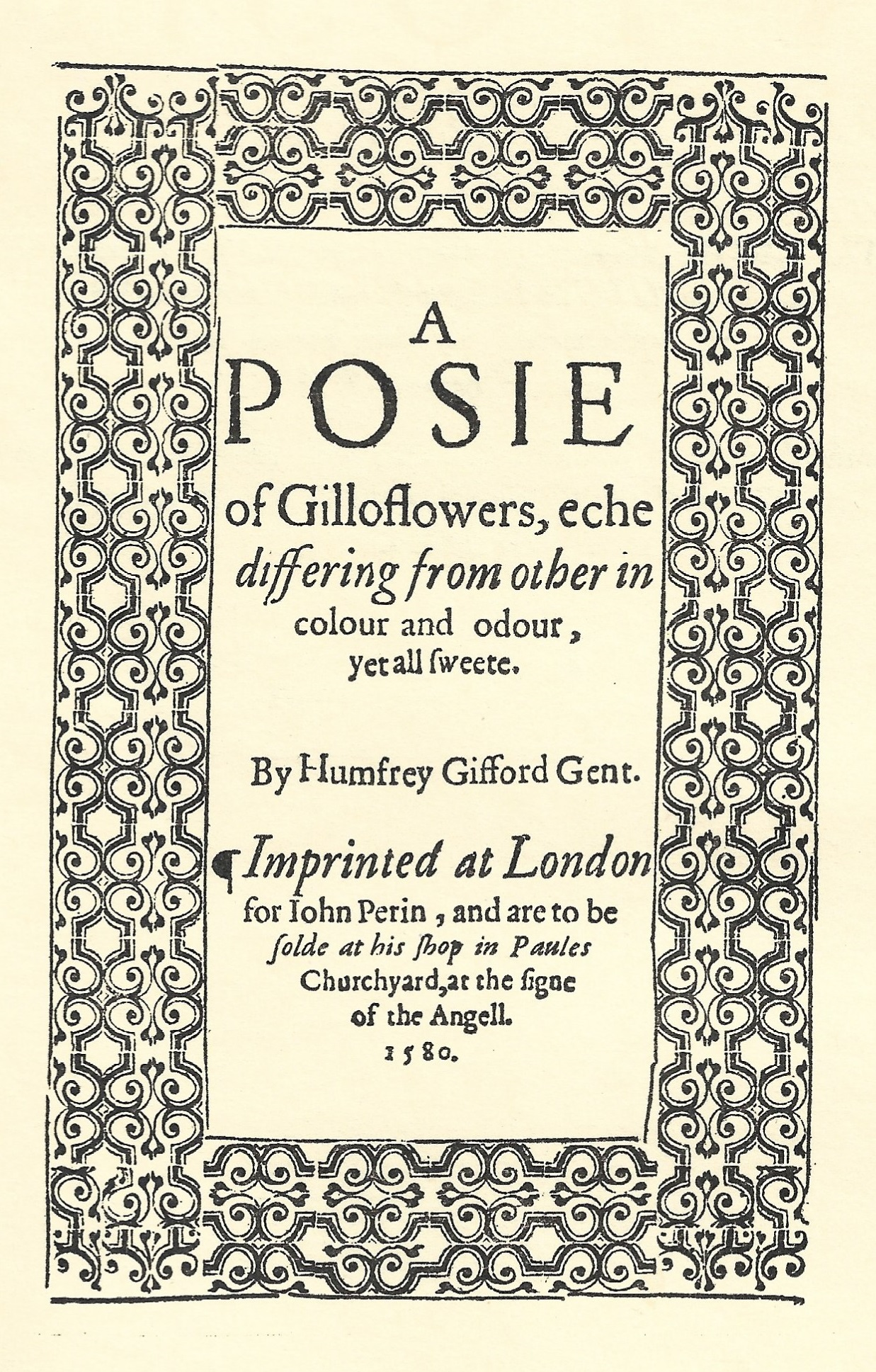
- 1580 edition of A Posie of Gilloflowers reproduced in 1933 edition

Humfrey Gifford (fl. 1580), was an English poet. In 1580 he published A Posie of Gilloflowers containing 46 poems, a selection of verse translations of Italian riddles and nine prose translations from Italian. A new edition was printed in 1875, edited by Alexander Balloch Grosart.

Grosart describes his reference copy of A Posie (now in the British Library) as a "unique exemplar". His edition is itself a rarity - only 40 copies were printed. However, a second copy of the original was discovered in 1930 and a further edition of A Posie was edited by F. J. Harvey Darton in 1933 - this time 500 copies were printed. More recently two of Gifford's poems were included in The Penguin Book of Elizabethan Verse.

Little is known of Gifford's life. In the Introduction to his Complete Poems, Grosart comments: "Our researches have been wide and persistent and warmly seconded by many fellow book-lovers. The result is sadly disproportionate to the expenditure." He places the Gifford family in Devon, and associates Humfrey with the Poultry Compter - a prison in Cheapside in the City of London - whether as an official or as an inmate is not clear.
