= Sangfroid =

Sangfroid may be:

- Sangfroid, an English loan phrase from French, literally, "cold-blooded", connoting calmness in a situation of danger or panic
- Sang-Froid: Tales of Werewolves, a 2013 video game by Artifice Studio
