= Vivian Walsh =

Vivian Walsh may refer to:

- Vivian Walsh (author), children's book author
- Vivian Walsh (aviator) (1888–1950), New Zealand aviator and engineer
