= Ian Punnett =

American radio broadcaster and author (1960–2023)

The Rev. Dr. Ian Punnett
- Born: Case Ian Punnett; March 3, 1960; Wilmette, Illinois, U.S.
- Died: December 22, 2023 (aged 63)
- Other name: Ian Case
- Education: University of Illinois at Urbana-Champaign; Arizona State University
- Occupations: Professor of Journalism at Kansas State University & Talk radio host
- Known for: Coast to Coast AM
- Spouse: Margery
- Children: 2

Case Ian Punnett (March 3, 1960 – December 22, 2023) was an American radio broadcaster, author, professor, and ordained Episcopal deacon.

In the early to mid 1980s, Punnett hosted the WLRW morning show in his college town along with Val Wallace. Punnett co-hosted Ian and Margery with his wife on KTMY in Minneapolis-St. Paul and was the regular Saturday night host of the widely syndicated paranormal-themed Coast to Coast AM, created by Art Bell. On December 3, 2011, Punnett announced that due to increasingly acute tinnitus, he would temporarily step down as regular Saturday night host of Coast to Coast AM, being replaced by John B. Wells: effective January 2012, Punnett would host the show one Sunday per month. In July 2013, Punnett ended his radio hosting career in order to begin studies for a doctoral degree. After receiving his Ph.D. in 2017, he returned as an occasional guest host of Coast to Coast AM in 2018 and became a faculty member and chief operator of the campus radio station at Kansas State University.

== Education ==
Punnett attended the University of Illinois at Urbana-Champaign, where he was a student columnist for the Daily Illini. He graduated in 1988, with a degree in English literature and rhetoric.

Punnett has a Master of Divinity degree from Columbia Theological Seminary in Atlanta, and has been ordained a Deacon in the Episcopal Church.

Punnett entered the Walter Cronkite School of Journalism and Mass Communication at Arizona State University as a Ph.D. student in August 2013. Punnett received his doctorate from Arizona State in 2017, after writing a dissertation titled "Toward a Theory of True Crime: Forms and Functions of Nonfiction Murder Narratives".

== Career ==
After college, under the pseudonym "Ian Case" (his first and middle names transposed), Punnett co-hosted rock morning radio shows on WXLP in the Quad Cities called Ian Case and the Coach and then Ian Case and The Duke with Mike "The Duke" Donegan on then-rock music station WKDF in Nashville, Tennessee in the early-to-mid-1990s. In between his Quad Cities stints, Punnett was also morning man on WMJY in Long Branch, New Jersey.

Punnett went on to talk radio at WGN in Chicago in 1993, continuing to work there until 1996. He then went to Atlanta, Georgia in 1997 to host a nightly talk show on WGST under his real name, Ian Punnett. He returned to the WKDF morning show in 1998, although he remained in Atlanta and broadcast the show from his home studio (while co-host Mike ‘Duke’ Donegan broadcast from the station's Nashville studio). Punnett would occasionally slip up and announce his real name instead of the pseudonym, which inadvertently became a running gag. That show's run ended in early 1999, shortly before WKDF switched to a country music format.

In Minneapolis-St. Paul, Punnett hosted the morning show (6-10 am) on KTMY-FM from 2002 until 2012. It was known as The Ian and Margery Show, and was co-hosted by his wife, Margery (a former TV producer who has worked for CNN as well as for The Oprah Winfrey Show) who did her part of the show from a studio in their home while getting their two teenage boys off to school. Punnett's final show on the station was on December 21, 2012, after which he left due to tinnitus.

On August 1, 2007, Punnett helped report the Minneapolis bridge collapse on CNN.

=== Coast to Coast AM ===
In 1998, Punnett began occasionally hosting Coast to Coast AM. In April 2000, Punnett became the regular Sunday-night host for Coast to Coast. He was the first person other than Art Bell to be "given" a night of the week in his or her name. In December, 2001, Punnett left Coast to Coast AM with Ian Punnett to do mornings in the Twin Cities for Hubbard Broadcasting and to concentrate on finishing seminary. His replacement for Sunday nights was George Noory who would eventually take over the entire show when Art Bell retired again a few years later. Although Punnett occasionally acted as a guest host, he did not rejoin Coast to Coast AM on a full-time basis until June 2005 when Art Bell, who had been doing the two weekend shifts again, announced that he wanted to host just one night a week in order to spend more time traveling with his wife, Ramona. Coast to Coast AM with Ian Punnett once again returned to the weekly line-up, this time on Saturdays.

On January 21, 2006, after the death of Ramona Bell, Punnett announced that Art Bell, the creator and original host of Coast to Coast AM would be returning from retirement to host each Saturday and Sunday night. Punnett then moved to Coast to Coast Live with Ian Punnett, a new, four-hour program, on January 28, 2006. The new show occupied a slot (6 pm-10 pm PT/9 pm-1 am ET) that previously had broadcast repeats of older Coast to Coast AM episodes (Coast to Coast AM begins at 1 am ET/10 pm PT). Many existing Coast to Coast AM affiliates automatically carried Punnett's new program from its first night, and in subsequent months several new affiliates came on board. As of June 2007, its affiliate count stood around 200. Since his affiliation with C2CAM (especially during his tenure with Coast to Coast Live), Punnett developed a loyal following of his own. He always opened the show with the "reminder" to "hostile invading aliens" hovering just beyond Earth's atmosphere to "eat the Canadians first", saying they are "much tastier" than Americans. After the retirement of Art Bell in July 2007, Coast to Coast Live was discontinued, with Punnett once again becoming host of the Saturday night edition of C2CAM. Show episodes with themes pertaining to cryptozoology or government conspiracies (favorite subjects of Coast to Coast AM) were generally designated to Punnett and slotted for Saturday nights.

On December 3, 2011, Punnett announced that due to increasing problems with his tinnitus, that he would have to step down as regular Saturday night host of Coast to Coast AM, being replaced by John B. Wells. In January 2012, Punnett began hosting the show one Sunday per month.

On May 16, 2013, Punnett announced on the air with George Noory that he would no longer be hosting Coast to Coast one Sunday per month. Punnett hosted his then-last show on July 14, 2013, his 479th episode over 13 years.

On May 6, 2018, George Noory announced that Punnett would return as a host of Coast to Coast, due to improvements in managing his tinnitus symptoms. Beginning in May 2018, Punnett hosted several shows each month, as one of the show's designated fill-in hosts for nights when Noory was unavailable.

== Personal life ==
Punnett met his wife, Margery, while the two were working at the Daily Illini at the University of Illinois at Urbana-Champaign.

Punnett suffered from tinnitus, which he first began experiencing in 2009.

In 2010, Punnett published a children's book, Dizzy the Mutt with the Propeller Butt. His second children's picture book, Jackula the Vampire Dog, was published in 2011.

His book How to Pray When You're Pissed at God was published in April 2013 by Harmony. The book was inspired by Punnett's discovery during his duties as a chaplain that many religious Americans were uncomfortable expressing anger to clergy or in their prayers. His goal was to illustrate with examples from the Bible how expressing anger is acceptable, even anger towards God. His second book was published in 2016 as A Black Night for the Bluegrass Belle, regarding the 1934 death of Virginia Garr Taylor in Kentucky while in the company of her companion Henry Denhardt. Additionally, Punnett co-edited an academic book on the history of car radios.

He taught multimedia journalism at Ohio Northern University during 2016 and 2017. From 2018, he was a faculty member of Kansas State University and chief operator of the campus radio station, Wildcat 91.9 FM.

Ian Punnett died on December 22, 2023, at the age of 63. His cause of death was genetic non-alcohol-related liver disease.

== Recognition ==
In October 2023, Punnett was inducted into the Kansas Association of Broadcasters Hall of Fame.

== Works ==
- A Black Night for the Bluegrass Belle, 2016, Acclaim Press, ISBN 978-1942613473 (hardcover).
- How to Pray When You’re Pissed at God: Or Anyone Else for that Matter, 2013, Harmony Books, Crown Publishers, Inc (Random House), ISBN 978-0307986030 (hardcover).
- Moving Sounds: A Cultural History of the Car Radio, 2019, Co-edited by Punnett and Phylis Johnson, Peter Lang Inc, ISBN 978-1433161216 (paperback);

For children:

- Jackula the Vampire Dog, 2011, Beaver's Pond Press, ISBN 978-1592984251 (hardcover).
- Dizzy the Mutt with the Propeller Butt, 2010, Beaver's Pond Press, ISBN 978-1592983285 (hardcover).
