= Carmen Martinez =

Carmen Martinez may refer to:

- Carmen Martínez (athlete), Paraguayan distance runner
- Carmen Martínez Aguayo, Spanish politician
- Carmen Martínez Castro (born 1961), Venezuelan-Spanish journalist
- Carmen Martínez Ramírez, Spanish politician
- Carmen Martínez Sancho (1901–1995), Spanish educator
- Carmen Martínez Sierra, Spanish actress
- Carmen Martínez Ten, Spanish physician
- Carmen Elena Rendiles Martínez (1903–1977), Venezuelan nun
- Carmen Gil Martinez (born 1962), Spanish children's writer
- Carmen Maria Martinez, American diplomat
