= Happiness Is =

Happiness Is may refer to:

== Film and television ==
- Happiness Is (film), a 2009 documentary

== Cartoons/Books ==
- Happiness Is (cartoon), book series by Lisa Swerling & Ralph Lazar

== Music ==
=== Albums ===
- Happiness Is, a 1966 album by Ray Conniff, or the title track (by Paul Evans and Paul Parnes, best known for the Cleo award-winning commercial for Kent cigarettes)
- Happiness Is, a 2014 album by Taking Back Sunday
- Happiness Is, a jazz album by Enrico Rava

=== Songs ===
- "Happiness Is", a 1967 song by actress Dora Bryan
- "Happiness Is", a song written by the Addrisi Brothers
- "Happiness Is", a 1966 single by Joe Sherman And The Arena Brass
- "Happiness Is", a 1974 single by New York City
- "Happiness Is", a song by The Verve Pipe from their 2001 album Underneath
- "Happiness Is", a song by Violent Femmes from their 2000 album Freak Magnet
- "Happiness is...", a single by Ami Suzuki

== See also ==
- Happiness Is in the Field (French: Le bonheur est dans le pré), a 1995 French comedy directed by Étienne Chatiliez
- Happiness is a cigar called Hamlet, advertisement campaign
- Happiness Is a Warm Blanket, Charlie Brown, a 2011 animated TV special
- Happiness Is You, album by Johnny Cash 1966
- Happiness... Is Not a Fish That You Can Catch, album by Canadian alternative rock band Our Lady Peace
- Happiness Is the Road, album by Marillion 2008
- "Happiness Is a Warm Gun", a song by the Beatles
- "Happiness Is a Thing Called Joe" song written by Harold Arlen, 1943
