= The Art of Frozen =

- Author: Charles Solomon
- Language: English
- Genre: Art book
- Published: 2013
- Publisher: Chronicle Books
- Publication place: United States
- Pages: 168
- ISBN: 978-1-45211-716-4

The Art of Frozen (ISBN 978-1-45211-716-4) is an art book about the 2013 Walt Disney Company animated feature film Frozen. The book is part of The Art of... series that aims to depict behind-the-scenes information on the artwork created during the development of animated films.

== Content ==
The Art of Frozen was written by Charles Solomon, with a preface by John Lasseter and a foreword by Chris Buck and Jennifer Lee. It was published by Chronicle Books in November 2013.

The information is divided into five sections (A Family Affair, Coronation, Wilderness, Ice Palace, and Return to Arendelle) which include concept art, storyboards, and finished art, alongside interviews by artists, writers, and other developers, thereby "giving the reader a full-scope of the efforts it took to create the finished film."

== Development ==
Although The Art of... books have been written since at least the early 1990s, The Entertainment Nut explained, "Since 2008, Chronicle [Books] has picked up the torch on publishing [The] Art Of [...] books for Disney's animated features".

Charles Solomon said the following on the books conception:

Frozen was originally slated for 2014, but when another film ran into trouble, the Frozen artists were asked if they could complete their film a year earlier than they had planned. As I mentioned in the acknowledgements, Chris Buck, Mike Giaimo and John Lasseter are artists I've written about many times over the years. I know, like, and respect them. When they said they were involved in the film, I knew it would worth writing about. And working with Emily Haynes at Chronicle Books and Leigh Anna MacFadden at Disney Publishing has always been enjoyable. So when they all asked, I said yes. However, I would have liked a bit more time to study the artwork—I often felt like I was skateboarding through the Louvre.

— Charles Solomon, in an interview with Animated Views

== Critical reception ==
AWN deemed the "umpty-umpth The Art of... coffee-table art book about the making of a modern animated cinematic feature masterpiece" as "insightful...visual treat" full of "splendid art", adding that "Frozen has a subtle frankness and originality to it – and The Art of Frozen emphasizes what that is". The Entertainment Nut wrote that the book "offers some rather intriguing insights into the production" and is "another great entry in behind-the-scenes material". Indiwire commented "Solomon concentrates far more on the story, writing, and artistic presentation of the film than most books in this genre do — making it a must-have." MediaMikes gave it 4 out of 5 stars, writing "Even though this may not be the best “Art of” book of the year, if you enjoyed the film then I would say that it is worth checking out still just keep expectation lower." One Movie our Reviews said the book goes beyond the film's artwork, and "tells a lot about the whole production process and the collaboration needed to bring a film of this level together." Rotoscopers described the book as "probably most anticipated piece of merchandise among animation fans" prior to the film's release. LaughingPLace wrote "This coffee table book is worth every penny...and is a great wealth of knowledge." Vahn Gharakhani of MoviePilot said "This beautiful book is not only my visual companion; it's an inspiration to my future as a filmmaker. " The Austin Chronicle described the book as "Disney's newest classic, taken back to its enchanting designs."
