= Bryan Perro =

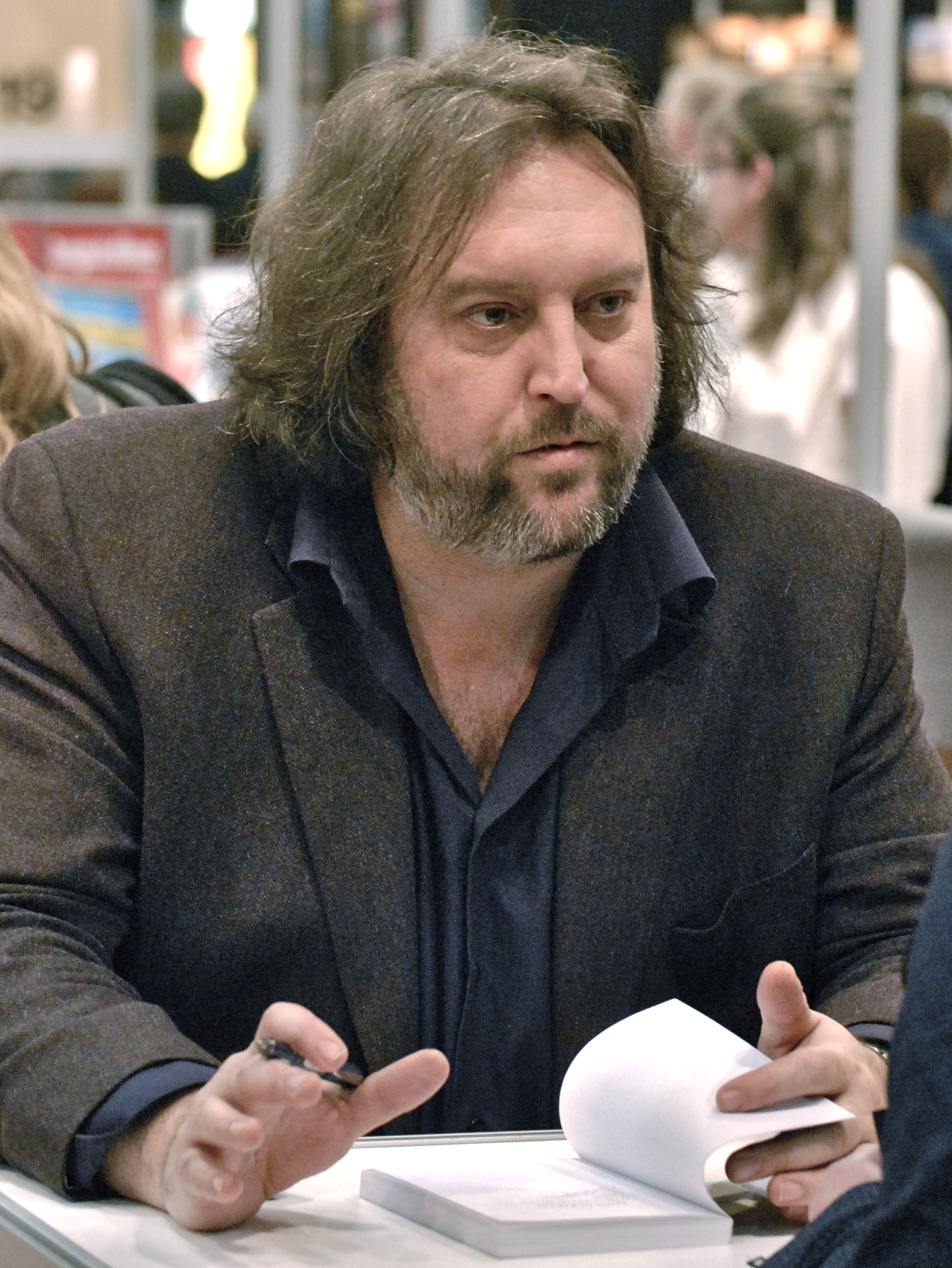
- Bryan Perro
- Born: 1968 (age 57–58); Shawinigan, Quebec
- Occupation: Author
- Writing career
- Genre: Children's literature

Bryan Perro (born Bryan Perrault, 11 June 1968) is the author of the children's fantasy fiction series Amos Daragon, a series of twelve novels that focus on the adventurous young adult Amos Daragon and his quest to become the 'Mask Wearer'.

== Background ==
Perro was born in Shawinigan, Quebec. He has completed training as a drama teacher and actor, as well as obtaining a master's degree in Education.

== Writing ==
Amos Daragon has been published in 18 languages including French, Russian, European Portuguese, Brazilian Portuguese and Japanese. The first English translation was published in June 2009 by Scribo, an imprint of the Salariya Book Company. Perro has been awarded a variety of prizes for his fiction, including the 2006 Quebec Youth Prize for Fiction and Fantasy. After publishing the 12 books from the Amos Daragon collection in 2003–2007, Bryan Perro decided to continue the adventures of Amos Daragon and published Le Sanctuaire des Braves in 2011, one of three new books to be published in the series.

He co-wrote the story for the video game Sang-Froid: Tales of Werewolves, developed by Canadian company Artifice Studio.

He has also published two children's books as part of the Walter & Tandoori franchise.
