= Daragon =

Daragon may refer to:

- Amos Daragon, protagonist of a series of fantasy fiction books by Bryan Perro
- Nicolas Daragon (born 1972), French politician

== See also ==
- Dragon
