= Carmen Gil Martinez =

Spanish children's writer

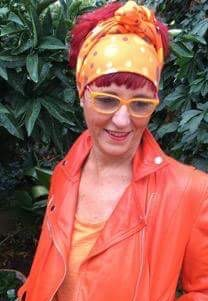
- Martinez in 2017
- Born: 1962 (age 63–64); La Línea de la Concepción, Spain
- Occupation: Professor
- Writing career
- Language: Spanish
- Period: 2003–present
- Genre: Children's literature
- Notable work: The Book of Holes
- Website: poemitas.org

Carmen Gil-Bonachera Martínez (born 1962) is a Spanish writer and literature teacher. She writes and illustrates stories, plays and poetry for children.

== Early life and education ==
Martinez was born in 1962 in La Línea de la Concepción in the province of Cádiz. She is a literature teacher at the IES San Blas de Aracena (Huelva).

== Life and career ==
She began publishing books in 2003, and since then, more than 150 of her works have been published, with publishers such as SM, Oxford, Planeta, Algar, Parramón, Cuento de Luz, Combel, Kalandraka, Timun Mas, and Lumen. Her works have been translated into over 15 languages. She specializes in children's literature, a task she combines with teaching and cultural activities for children. She has carried out projects in theater, puppetry, storytelling, and dance workshops. She teaches poetry courses in primary schools. She gives talks on reading promotion for families and teachers. She collaborates with various institutions (the Cervantes Institute, the Andalusian Center for Literature, regional governments, universities, etc.), giving lectures and holding meetings with readers. Her plays have been performed in Spain and Latin America.

Martinez founded the digital children's poetry magazine, Cosicosas.

== Works and publications ==
Her works in Spanish include:

- El secreto de la abuela Petra. Editorial Kokoro.
- Crececuentos: diez cuentos para hacerse mayor. Editorial Parramón.
- Soy una bruja (Editorial Aljibe)
- El libro del mi-mi-miedo (Editorial GEU)
- El libro de los monstruos (EditorialToromítico)
- Chucu viaja a la Prehistoria (Grupo SM)
- Sueñacuentos: diez cuentos para soñar toda la noche (Editorial Parramón)
  - Translated into French, Galician, and Catalan
- Las aventuras del hada Marcela (Editorial Algar)
- Versos de cuento (Grupo SM)
- ¡Qué fastidio ser princesa!. Cuento de Luz.
  - Translated into English
- Historia de una cucaracha. Cuento de Luz.
  - Translated into Catalan and English
- El libro de las princesas (Toromítico)
- ¡Brujas! (Edimáter, 2013)
- Chucu y el pollito Cascarón (Grupo SM)
- Lila y el fantasma de la colina (Grupo SM)
- El sueño de Pinto (Grupo SM)
- Bebo y Teca, de paseo con las letras (colección 11 libros con cuentos y poesías) (Grupo SM)
- Superhéroes en apuros: 10 cuentos para dibujar sonrisas (Parramón)
  - Translated into Catalan
- Cuando te enamoras (GEU)
- Los Vampiria no descansan (Grupo SM)
- Coeducación en el cole (CCS)
- La paloma Mari Paz (Grupo SM)
- Las divertidas aventuras del caballero Godofredo (Versos y Trazos)
  - Translated into Catalan
- ¡Qué miedo! (Aljibe)
- El libro de los piratas (Toromítico)
- Cuento de la Alhambra (Versos y Trazos)
- Chucu y el hada Margarita (Grupo SM)
- Lila y el dragón verde limón (Grupo SM)
- Pinto y la bruja Braulia (Grupo SM)
- Granada, un recorrido en pictogramas (Grupo SM)
- ¡Hoy es fiesta! (CCS)
- Pistacho, el perro verde (Aljibe)
- Los amigos de Peca (Grupo SM)
- El viaje de Lino (Grupo SM)
- ¿Mi vecina es una bruja? (Algar)
- El hado Waldo (Algar)
- Los duendes barrigudos (Grupo SM)
- El tesoro de la laguna (Versos y Trazos)
- El príncipe sapo (Versos y Trazos)
- Cuentos para pasar miedo... o no tanto (Toro Mítico-Almuzara)
- La familia Trotadeporte viaja a Pekín (Grupo SM)
- La familia Trotadeporte en la piscina olímpica (Grupo SM)
- La familia Trotadeporte en la cancha de baloncesto (Grupo SM)
- La familia Trotadeporte en el gimnasio olímpico (Grupo SM)
- La familia Trotadeporte en la pista de atletismo (Grupo SM)
- La giganta Cereza (Planeta-Oxford)
- A la sombra de otro amor (Algar)
- Unos animales muy originales (Colección Caracol, CEDMA)
- El libro de las hadas (Toro Mítico-Almuzara)
- La mansión misteriosa (Combel)
- Me llamo John Lennon (Parramón)
  - Translated into Catalan
- El pirata Patarata y su abuela Celestina (Laberinto)
- Las brujas trillizas (Editorial CCS)
- ¡Vaya lata de pirata! ( Editorial CCS)
- La princesa que bostezaba a todas horas (Oqo)
  - Traducido al catalán, gallego, portugués, Italian, French, Korean and Turkish
- ¡A jugar con los poemas! (Editorial CCS)
- El caballero Pepino (Oqo)
  - Traducido al gallego
- La detective Julieta y el misterio de la clase (Laberinto)
- El tesoro de Casimiro el Feo (Editorial Algar)
- Pictogramas en la historia de El Cid Campeador (Grupo SM)
- Leer, contar y jugar (Editorial CCS)
- Celeste, la estrella marina (Combel)
- Un fantasma con asma (Kalandraka Editora)
- La sonrisa de Daniela. Kalandraka. 2007.
  - Traducido al gallego, catalán y portugués
- La detective Julieta y el caso del Ratón Pérez (in Spanish). Ediciones del Laberinto. 2007-05-24. ISBN 978-84-8483-238-6.
- Los fantasmas de la mansión de tía Ágata (in Spanish). Ediciones del Laberinto. July 2010. ISBN 978-84-8483-352-9.
- La Casa del Tejo. Edimáter. 2012.
- La Caja de Los Agujeros. Cuento de Luz. 2014-04-15. ISBN 978-84-15784-40-1.
  - Translated into English
- Las Cosas Del Aire (in Spanish). Cuento de Luz. 2014-05-13. ISBN 978-84-15241-15-7.
  - Translated into English
- Kibo y el dragón morado (in Spanish). Cuento de Luz. 2014-10-14. ISBN 978-84-16078-20-2.
  - Translated into English
- Senor Si (in Spanish). Cuento de Luz. March 2018. ISBN 978-84-16733-35-4.
  - Translated into English
- Me llamo Ana Frank. Parramón. 2019.

== Awards and honors ==
In 2008, she received first prize at the International Latino Book Awards for Margarito.

Her book La sonrisa de Daniela won the White Raven award from the International Youth Library in Munich (Germany) and an International Latino Book Award in 2014.

The Navarre Federation of Ikastolas awarded her book La princesa que yastezaba a todas horas (The Princess Who Yawned All the Time) in the 2011 Juul campaign.

Her book The Book of Holes won second prize for Best Illustrated Album, and Las cosas del Aire (Things of the Air) received a special mention at the 2014 International Latino Book Awards.
