= Carol Lazar =

South African journalist, editor, columnist and author

- Born: 1941 (age 84–85); Belfast, Northern Ireland
- Occupations: Journalist, editor, columnist, author
- Notable work: Women of South Africa: Their Fight for Freedom, Tips for Trips
- Spouse: Robin Lazar
- Children: 4, Ralph Lazar

Carol Lazar (born 1941) is a South African journalist, editor, columnist and author whose reporting has covered apartheid-era politics, racial inequality, social issues and travel. She worked for newspapers including the Rand Daily Mail, Sunday Express, Business Day and The Star, where she became a senior assistant editor.

During the Soweto uprising in 1976, Lazar reported alongside South African photographer Peter Magubane, spending four days inside Soweto covering the uprising. She later wrote the text for Magubane's photographic book Women of South Africa: Their Fight for Freedom (1993), with an introduction by Nadine Gordimer.

== Early life ==
Lazar was born in 1941 in Belfast, Northern Ireland. Her mother had fled Nazi Germany, while her father was a South African doctor who volunteered for military service during the Second World War. Her father was serving with Allied forces in the Middle East, while his unit base was in Northern Ireland.

== Career ==
Lazar began her career as a copywriter before moving into journalism. She later recalled that Rand Daily Mail editor Raymond Louw encouraged her to enter the profession.

She worked as a reporter, editor and columnist for publications including the Rand Daily Mail, Sunday Express, Business Day and The Star. Her career included major news stories and investigations, and she later became a senior assistant editor at The Star.

During her journalism career, Lazar worked with prominent South African press photographers including Peter Magubane, Alf Kumalo, Ken Oosterbroek and Kevin Carter. A biographical account of Lazar states that she also learned photography from the photographers with whom she worked. Oosterbroek and Carter were later associated with the group of photojournalists known as the Bang-Bang Club.

Lazar also worked as a columnist. Later published accounts have described her as an author, columnist, photojournalist and former senior editor for South Africa's Independent Newspapers.

== Journalism during apartheid ==
Lazar reported on political events, racial inequality and social conditions during the apartheid era. During the Soweto uprising in June 1976, she reported alongside photographer Peter Magubane, spending four days inside Soweto covering the uprising.

Contemporary records of the Rand Daily Mail document Lazar's reporting in the immediate aftermath of the uprising. Her article "Fear hits white suburbs" was published on 19 June 1976 and drew on eyewitness accounts.

Her journalism also examined the social and economic conditions experienced by black South Africans. In 1990, Lazar accompanied an elderly black pensioner while grocery shopping and documented how she attempted to survive on her monthly pension. The article was subsequently examined in academic research into representations of black consumers in the South African press.

In 1986, Lazar reviewed Maureen Swan's Gandhi: The South African Experience for The Star. She described the book as challenging conventional interpretations of Mahatma Gandhi's role in South African history and discussed its relevance to the country's contemporary political circumstances.

In 1993, Lazar and Magubane collaborated on Women of South Africa: Their Fight for Freedom. The book combined Magubane's photographs with Lazar's text and an introduction by South African writer and Nobel laureate Nadine Gordimer. Lazar's contribution provided historical context for the photographs and examined the experiences and political role of South African women during apartheid.

== Travel journalism ==
Lazar later became travel editor of The Star and Saturday Star. She established the Saturday Star travel section, which a later retrospective described as becoming the largest in South Africa.

In a 2005 interview with the Mail & Guardian, Lazar discussed the relationship between editorial coverage and the travel industry and described the publications' travel coverage as editorially independent of advertisers.

In 2006, Lazar discussed the ethics of sponsored travel with the Mail & Guardian, saying that journalists accepting sponsored trips were not required to promise favourable coverage and were expected to report their experiences independently.

In 2010, The Guardian identified Lazar as travel editor of The Star while reporting on South African reactions to international media coverage before the 2010 FIFA World Cup.

Lazar's travel writing also included the book Tips for Trips, a guide drawing on her experience as a travel writer and editor.

By 2013, Lazar had retired from full-time journalism but continued to work as a freelance writer.

== Human rights commentary ==
Lazar continued to write about human rights and South African politics after the end of apartheid. In a 2007 column for The Star, she criticised aspects of the South African government's foreign policy, including its approach to governments accused of human-rights abuses and its position on the conflict in Darfur. Her commentary was subsequently discussed in academic research on South African foreign policy and the Responsibility to Protect.

== Personal life ==
Lazar was married to Robin Lazar, a Johannesburg laboratory owner who gave expert evidence for the defence during litigation arising from the Rand Daily Mail's reporting on alleged torture and assaults at Cinderella Prison. Journalist Benjamin Pogrund wrote that Robin Lazar conducted chemical analyses and testified about the effects of electric shocks on human skin, despite the potential risk to his business and of attracting government attention.

During cross-examination, prosecutor Percy Yutar challenged Robin Lazar's motives for giving evidence. According to Pogrund, Lazar stood by his evidence. Pogrund described him as an "unsung hero".

== Selected works ==
- Women of South Africa: Their Fight for Freedom, text by Carol Lazar, photographs by Peter Magubane, introduction by Nadine Gordimer (Little, Brown, 1993)
- Tips for Trips (David Philip Publishers, 2002)
