= Me Without You (book) =

2010 book by Lisa Swerling and Ralph Lazar

Me Without You is a book written and illustrated by Lisa Swerling and Ralph Lazar. It was published by Summersdale Publishers in the UK in 2010 and by Chronicle Books of San Francisco in October 2011, and was on the New York Times Bestsellers list in March 2015.

Through Kickstarter, Los Angeles–based songwriter Bethany Rubin funded an animated music video of her song based on the book. The video was released in June 2015.

== International Editions ==
- UK: Summersdale (2010)
- US & Canada: Chronicle Books (2011)
- Taiwan: Grimm Press (2014)
- Korea: Indigo (2014)
- Indonesia: PT Gramedia Pustaka Utama (2016)
- Turkey: Pegasus Publishing House (2017)
- Brazil: Editora Belas Letras (2020)
