= Arbordale Publishing =

Children's book publishing company

- Founded: 2004
- Founder: Donna and Lee German
- Country of origin: United States
- Headquarters location: Mount Pleasant, SC
- Publication types: Books
- Nonfiction topics: science, math, folklore
- No. of employees: 10
- Official website: arbordalepublishing.com

Arbordale Publishing is an independent children's book publishing company located in Mount Pleasant, SC.

== History ==
It was founded in 2004 by co-owners Lee and Donna German as "Sylvan Dell Publishing," named for Donna's ancestral family homestead in Wilmington, DE. In 2013, they were sued by Sylvan Learning Center over the use of the word "sylvan" in the company name. Sylvan Dell means "wooded valley," and the company settled the lawsuit by changing the name to Arbordale in 2014. "Arbordale" also means wooded valley. This consistency in meaning allowed the company to keep their same logo, which represents learning leaves falling into an open book or valley.

== Education ==
Arbordale books are aligned to Common Core, Next Generation Science Standards (NGSS), as well as state education standards. Arbordale books are vetted by experts and professionals from a variety of organizations including NASA, JPL, Project Learning Tree, USFWS, SeaWorld, the Cherokee Nation and others.

This publisher releases approximately 20 titles each year.

== Notable authors ==
- Mary Alice Monroe

== Awards ==
- NSTA/CBC Outstanding Science Trade Books - "Ferdinand Fox's First Summer," "On the Move: Mass Migrations," "Polar Bears and Penguins: A Compare and Contrast Book," "Desert Baths," "Gopher to the Rescue! A Volcano Recovery Story," "Newton and Me," "After A While Crocodile: Alexa's Diary," "Animal Mouths," "Bat Count: A Citizen Science Story," "Cao Chong Weighs an Elephant," "Honey Girl: The Hawaiian Monk Seal," "Living Things and Nonliving Things: A Compare and Contrast Book," and "Moonlight Crab Count."
- CBC Children's Choices - "Kali's Story: An Orphaned Polar Bear Rescue" and "Once Upon an Elephant"
- Literary Classics Gold Award - "Nature Recycles: How About You?," "Animalogy," and "The Great Divide"
- Gelett Burgess Book Award - Home in the Cave and A Warm Winter Tail
