= Lisa Swerling =

South African-British artist and author (born 1972)

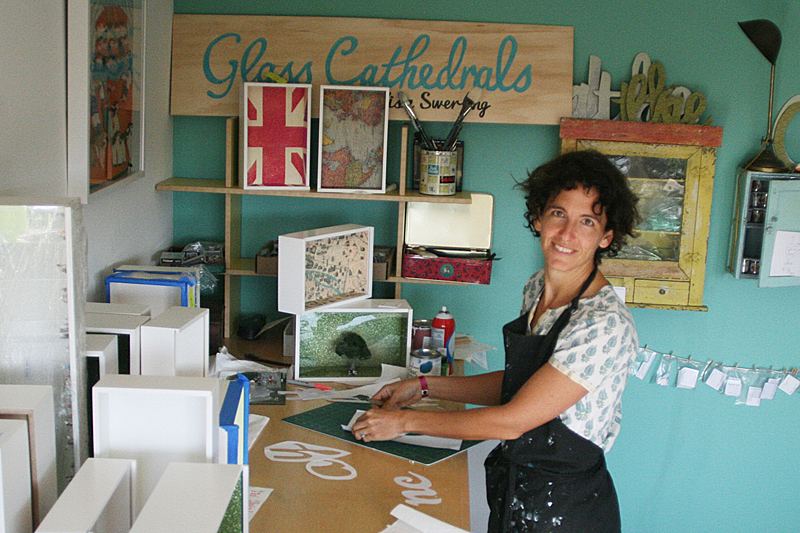
- Lisa Swerling in her studio
- Born: 1972 (age 53–54); Cape Town, South Africa
- Occupations: Artist, Author, Illustrator
- Spouse: Ralph Lazar
- Writing career
- Period: 1999–present
- Genres: Art, Illustration
- Notable works: Glass Cathedrals, Harold's Planet, Happiness Is

Lisa Swerling (born 1972) is a South African-British artist, illustrator and author. She is known for her Glass Cathedrals artworks and for her collaborations with Ralph Lazar, including Happiness Is and Me Without You. Me Without You appeared on The New York Times Best Seller list in 2015.

In 2026, Swerling created and curated Heathbound, a group art exhibition featuring works by 17 artists inspired by Hampstead Heath, held at Burgh House in Hampstead.

== Life ==
Swerling was born in Cape Town, South Africa, in 1972. She studied philosophy and politics at New College, Oxford, and art at Central Saint Martins.

She is married to artist and author Ralph Lazar, with whom she has collaborated on books, cartoons and illustration projects.

== Glass Cathedrals ==
Swerling is known for Glass Cathedrals, a series of glass-fronted boxes containing miniature figures arranged in scenes. The Marin Independent Journal described the works as small-scale dioramas using miniature figures to explore themes including relationships and everyday life.

In 2011, her work was exhibited at Unique LA. The Los Angeles Times featured the miniature works in its coverage of the event.

== Illustration and writing ==
Swerling has collaborated extensively with her husband, Ralph Lazar. Their projects include Happiness Is, Harold's Planet, Vimrod and Me Without You.

Harold's Planet and Vimrod were developed by Swerling and Lazar and became greeting-card properties.

Swerling and Lazar are the creators of Happiness Is . . . 500 Things to Be Happy About, published by Chronicle Books in 2014. They subsequently produced further books in the Happiness Is series.

With Lazar, Swerling co-authored Me Without You, which appeared on The New York Times Best Seller list in March 2015.

Swerling and Lazar also contributed to children's science books featuring The Brainwaves. How Nearly Everything Was Invented was named a Book of the Week by The Washington Post in 2007. A related title won the junior category of the Royal Society Prizes for Science Books in 2007.

== Heathbound ==
In 2026, Swerling created and curated Heathbound, an exhibition at Burgh House devoted to artists' interpretations of Hampstead Heath. The exhibition brought together work by 17 artists, including Rob Ryan, Lauren Child and Ben Wilson, known for his miniature paintings on discarded chewing gum.
