= David Salariya =

Scottish author, artist and publisher (born 1954)

- Born: 28 July 1954 (age 72); Dundee, Scotland
- Other names: David Stewart; Max Marlborough
- Education: Duncan of Jordanstone College of Art and Design; University of Sussex
- Occupations: Author, artist, designer and publisher
- Known for: Founder of Salariya Book Company

David Salariya FRSA (born 28 July 1954) is a Scottish author, artist and designer. He is the founder of children's books publisher Salariya Book Company. He has created and designed many children's book series, including the You Wouldn't Want To Be series. He writes as David Stewart and Max Marlborough.

== Early life and education ==
David Salariya was born in Dundee, Scotland, in 1954. He attended Ancrum Road Primary School then Harris Academy, before studying illustration and printmaking at Duncan of Jordanstone College of Art and Design in Dundee, specialising in book design in his post-graduate year. He trained to be an art teacher at the University of Sussex.

== Career ==
Salariya started his career as a freelance illustrator and designer in London and Italy. In 1989, he founded the Salariya Book Company in Brighton, which has imprints including: Book House, Scribblers and Scribo. He collaborated on works including multi dimensional CD Rom in 1995 and Augmented Reality in 2010.

In 2017, Salariya inaugurated the Stratford-Salariya Children's Picture Book Prize for unpublished picture book writers and illustrators.

In 2023, he was made a fellow of the Royal Society of Arts.

=== Salariya Book Company ===
In 2019, the Salariya Book Company's children’s history book The You Wouldn’t Want To Be an Ancient Egyptian Mummy was developed into a theatre show.

The Salariya Book Company experienced difficulties during the COVID-19 pandemic, with trading issues brought on by UK lockdown. The company was eventually closed down and sold to Bonnier Books UK in November 2022.

== Exhibitions ==
Salariya has contributed to group exhibitions at The Royal Scottish Academy, Compass Gallery, and Stirling Gallery. He has three works in the collection of the University of Dundee.

== Personal life ==
Salariya lives in Brighton with his wife Shirley and their son Jonathan.
