= David Arscott =

British author and local historian (1942–2024)

- Born: 9 December 1942
- Died: 29 November 2024 (aged 81); Lewes, East Sussex, England
- Education: Hertford College, Oxford
- Occupations: Author, local historian, publisher

David John Arscott (9 December 1942 – 29 November 2024) was a British author, local historian and publisher from Sussex.

Arscott wrote more than 40 books about Sussex, as well as several volumes of the Salariya Book Company's Very Peculiar History series and a number of works of fiction. His 1984 novel The Frozen City has been translated into Japanese. His first venture into political satire, Lady Thatcher's Wink, was published in 2016. As an author, his books are largely held in libraries worldwide.

Arscott worked as a journalist from 1959, first with the Investors Chronicle and the Evening Standard in London and then for the English language paper The Daily Journal in Caracas, Venezuela. Returning to England, he reported for the Dorset Evening Echo. After taking an English degree at Hertford College, Oxford, he joined BBC Radio Brighton as a news producer, switching to general programme production and presentation shortly before the station expanded to become BBC Radio Sussex.

His publishing company, Pomegranate Press, founded in 1992, offered a self-publishing service to other authors. It initially specialised in books with a Sussex theme but later expanded to include the Pomegranate Practicals nutshell guides, fiction and a range of non-fiction titles.

He was also involved in media training with Curtin and Co, working with colleagues in the UK and abroad to coach individuals and groups in improving their skills in front of the microphone and the camera.

Arscott lived in Lewes. He died there, in the grounds of Lewes Priory, on 29 November 2024, at the age of 81.

== Bibliography ==
=== Sussex books ===
Hidden Sussex (with Warden Swinfen) (BBC Radio Sussex) 1984

People of Hidden Sussex (with Warden Swinfen) (BBC Radio Sussex) 1985

Hidden Sussex Day by Day (with Warden Swinfen) (BBC Radio Sussex) 1987

Hidden Sussex The Towns (with Warden Swinfen) (BBC Radio Sussex) 1990

Explore Sussex (Countryside Books) 1986

The Sussex Story (Pomegranate Press) 1992

Living Sussex (Pomegranate Press) 1994

Curiosities of East Sussex (SB Publications) 1991

Hastings and the 1066 Country (SB Publications) 1993

Curiosities of West Sussex (SB Publications) 1993

A Sussex Quiz Book (SB Publications) 1993

Tales from the Parish Pump (SB Publications) 1994

Sussex, the County in Colour (Dovecote Press) 1995

A Second Sussex Quiz Book (SB Publications) 1995

Dead and Buried in Sussex (SB Publications) 1997

Sussex Privies (Countryside Books) 1998

What the Vicar Saw (Pomegranate Press) 1999

The Sussex Millennium Book (Pomegranate Press) 1999

The Sussex Gardens Book (Pomegranate Press) 2000

A Century of Brighton & Hove (Sutton Publishing) 2000

Eastbourne Past & Present (Sutton Publishing) 2001

Horsham Past & Present (Sutton Publishing) 2002

Brighton in the News (Sutton Publishing) 2002

Amberley Castle (Dovecote Press) 2002

A Century of Eastbourne (Sutton Publishing) 2002

Chailey Heritage (SB Publications) 2003

East Sussex Events (Phillimore) 2003

The Sussex Bedside Book (Dovecote Press) 2003

Our Lewes (Sutton Publishing) 2004

Sussex: a Colour Portrait (Countryside Books 2004

Lewes Then & Now vol. 2 (with Bill Young) (SB Publications) 2004

The Neat & Nippy Guide to Lewes (SB Publications) 2006

Wunt be Druv: a salute to the Sussex dialect (Countryside Books) 2006

A Sussex Kipling (Pomegranate Press) 2007

A Tour Along the Sussex Coast (Snake River Press) 2008

Brighton: a Very Peculiar History (Salariya) 2009

The Sussex Pub Quiz Book (Pomegranate Press) 2010

The Little Book of Sussex (History Press) 2011

Horsham Then & Now (History Press) 2011

Floreat Lewys: 500 Years of Lewes Old Grammar School (Pomegranate Press) 2012

Brighton, a Very Peculiar History Quiz Book (Salariya) 2012

A Sussex Belloc (Pomegranate Press) 2024

=== Very Peculiar Histories (Salariya) ===
The Blitz, 2009

Rations, 2010

The World Cup, 2010

The Olympics, 2011

60 Years a Queen, 2011

Golf, 2011

The Sixties, 2012

Sex, 2012

England vol. I, 2013

Oxford, 2013

Wine, 2016

Churchill, 2018

The Thames, 2018

Bath, 2019

British Prime Ministers, 2020

American Presidents, 2020

Climate Change, 2020

=== Fiction ===
A Revelstoke Reverie, The New Review, Vol. 1, No. 11, 1975

The Frozen City (with David Marl) (Allen & Unwin) 1984

A Flight of Bright Birds (with David Marl) (Allen & Unwin) 1985

Cultic Cyphers from Celtic Cyprus (7,5) (Pomegranate Press) 2002

Maracas in Caracas: short stories from England and the Americas (Pomegranate Press) 2005

Boyhunt (with David Marl) (Pomegranate Press) 2006

The Eye and the Blade Trilogy (with David Marl) (The Frozen City, A Flight of Bright Birds, Shadows in Crimson Colours) (Pomegranate Press) 2009

Lady Thatcher’s Wink (Pomegranate Press) 2016

=== Other ===
Agelines: change, challenge and choice in an ageing society (BBC Radio Sussex) 1987

The Upstart Gardener (Lindel Organisation) 1988

The Stream Garden (with Archie Skinner) (Ward Lock) 1996

Good English: how to speak it and to write it (Pomegranate Press) 1997

Headline: a beginner’s guide to mastering the media (Pomegranate Press) 1998

Good Essays: how to plan them and to write them (with Ann Varley) (Pomegranate Press) 1999

Self Publish: how to create and market your own book (Pomegranate Press) 2004)

A Little Book of Arscotts (Pomegranate Press) 2012

Who’s Afraid of Spelling? (Salariya) 2014

Who’s Afraid of Clear English? (Salariya) 2014
