= Scribblers =

- Parent company: Salariya Book Company
- Founded: 2007
- Founder: David Salariya
- Country of origin: United Kingdom
- Headquarters location: Brighton, England
- Publication types: Books
- Fiction genres: children's literature
- Official website: www.scribblersbooks.com

Scribblers is an imprint of the Salariya Book Company publishes books designed to develop key learning skills for babies, toddlers and young children. Scribblers was established in 2007 by David Salariya, and currently publishes board books for babies and toddlers plus early-learning and activity books for pre-school children.

== History ==
The Salariya Book Company was founded as a book-packaging company by David Salariya in Brighton, England, in 1989, and in 2002 started publishing under its imprint Book House. In 2007, Salariya launched its imprint Scribblers a division of Book House, publishing books designed to encourage key developmental skills for babies, toddlers and pre-school children. The You Wouldn't Want To Be series of books is their best-known series world wide.

In March 2009, the US edition of All About Me: A Babies Guide to Babies was named one of the CCBC's (Cooperative Children's Book Centre) choices 2009.

In April 2010 Scribblers will publish the first two titles in its Book, Webcam, Action! series: Tyrone the Clean 'o' Saurus and What Lola Wants... Lola Gets. These books are the first to feature augmented reality technology in a title aimed at young children.

== Series ==
- EyeBaby
- Teddy Time
- Brighter Baby
- Chunkie Hunkies
- Dressing Dolls
- First...
- Spot and Match
- Tiara Sticker Books
- Touch Feel Flip Flap
- Tough Stuff
- Where on Earth?
- Words, Numbers
- Ring for Rescue

== See also ==
- You Wouldn't Want To Be
