= The Brainwaves =

Cartoon characters created by Dorling Kindersley

The Brainwaves are cartoon characters that populate Dorling Kindersley's children's reference books.

The first title in the series, "How Nearly Everything Was Invented...by The Brainwaves" was first published in September 2006. It was written by Jilly MacLeod and Illustrated by Lisa Swerling & Ralph Lazar and is available in 14 languages. Awards and nominations include The Royal Society Prizes for Science Books (junior prize shortlist - 2007), The Washington Post Book of the Week (April 2007) and The US Parents' Choice Award (shortlist non-fiction 2006)).

The second title in the series, "How The Incredible Human Body Works...by The Brainwaves" was published in September 2007. It was written by Richard Walker and Illustrated by Lisa Swerling & Ralph Lazar and is available in over a dozen languages. It was shortlisted for The Royal Society Prizes for Science Books (junior prize - 2008)

The third title in the series, "The Most Stupendous Atlas of the Whole Wide World...by The Brainwaves" was published in October 2008. It was written by Simon Adams and Illustrated by Lisa Swerling & Ralph Lazar.

The fourth title in the series, "The Most Explosive Science Book in the Universe...by The Brainwaves" was published in April 2009. It was written by Claire Watts and Illustrated by Lisa Swerling & Ralph Lazar and won a US Parents' Choice Award in June 2009.

The fifth title in the series, "The Greatest Intergalactic Guide to Space Ever...by The Brainwaves" was published in November 2009. It was written by Dorling Kindersley and Illustrated by Lisa Swerling & Ralph Lazar

The sixth title in the series, "The Most Brilliant Boldly Going Book of Exploration Ever" was published in 2010. It was written by Peter Chrisp and Illustrated by Lisa Swerling & Ralph Lazar
