= Grupo Novo Século =

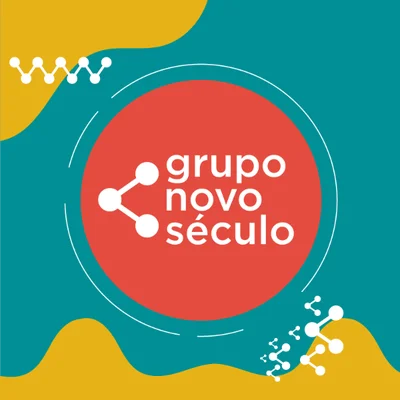
- Status: Active
- Founded: 2001; 24 years ago
- Founder: Luiz Vasconcelos
- Country of origin: Brazil
- Headquarters location: São Paulo
- Fiction genres: Fiction, non-fiction, religious, literature, kids literature, self-help, others

Grupo Novo Século is a Brazilian publishing company known for publishing fiction, non-fiction and Christian books. They own 5 main publishers, NS Editora, Talentos da Literatura Brasileira, Ágape, Figurati, and Autores Independentes. Up until 2021, Grupo Novo Século published more than 1,700 books.

== History ==
Grupo Novo Século was created in São Paulo by Luiz Vasconcelos in 2001. In 2016, Grupo Novo Século closed a contract with the e-commerce Nerd Loot. In 2017, due the popularity of their Marvel Comics book adaptations, Grupo Novo Século closed a distribution contract with Disney. In 2019, the company realigned their branding strategy and made several changes including their logo.

== Publishing companies ==
- NS Editora: Originally called Novo Século, this is the main publisher from Grupo Novo Século. They publish a miscellaneous of fiction and non-fiction books. In 2019, Novo Século changed its name to NS. NS works with several imprints, including NS Classics, that publishes classical books with better finishing, Marvel Novo Século, that publishes books adaptations from Marvel Comics stories, Estante de Medicina, medicine books for the general public, NS English, that publishes books in English, Geektopia, focused in geek books and comic books, and others.
- Talentos da Literatura Brasileira: Publisher created in 2006, focused in national books.
- Editora Ágape: Publisher created in 2011, focused in religious books. In 2020, Ágape entered in the retail market and began an exclusive partnership with the Baptist publisher Convicção.
- Figurati: Publisher created in 2014 focused in literature, child literature and personal development.
- Autores Independentes: E-book publisher created in 2015, similar to Talentos da Literatura Brasileira.

== See also ==
- List of publishers of children's books
- List of comics publishing companies
