= Big Guy Books =

Big Guy Books is an independent publisher of children's books founded by Robert Gould. Its books are aimed at encouraging boys to read.

The company is based in Encinitas, California.
