= The Frozen City =

The Frozen City is a novel by David Arscott and David J. Marl published in 1984.

== Plot summary ==
The Frozen City is a novel in which a young man lives in a city which is under the leadership of a cruel regime.

== Reception ==
Dave Langford reviewed The Frozen City for White Dwarf #62, and stated that "Not particularly new or astonishing in itself, this gains freshness and force from the allegorical presentation. A modest success. Fantasy's so hidebound that it's still a novelty for authors to suggest that even a benign dictatorship, or monarchy, may not be a good thing."

== Reviews ==
- Review by Brian Stableford (1985) in Fantasy Review, March 1985
- Review by Sue Thomason (1985) in Vector 128
- Review by Mary Gentle (1985) in Interzone, #14 Winter 1985/86
