= William Darton =

William Darton, Sr. (1755–1819) was a British publisher of children's books. His business was located on Gracechurch Street in London.

Darton was the son of John Darton, an innkeeper. Darton's son William Darton, Jr. (1781–1854) was with the firm in Holborn. Another descendant, Joseph William Darton (1844–1916), became a founding partner in the British publisher Wells Gardner, Darton and Company.

== See also ==
- F. J. Harvey Darton
