= F. J. Harvey Darton =

English writer and publisher of children's literature

Frederick Joseph Harvey Darton (22 September 1878 – 26 July 1936) was an author, publisher, and historian of children's literature. He was best known for his pioneering works in The Story of English Children's Books in England: Five Centuries of Social Life (1932). The Children's Books History Society presented an award in his honour.

== Biography ==
F. J. Harvey Darton was the eldest child of Joseph William Darton (1844–1916) and Mary Darton (née Schooling). His father was a partner in the publishing firm Wells Gardner, Darton and Company, where William Wells Gardner (1821–1880) had started to produce mainly ecclesiastical texts, but branched out into children's literature, with the elder Darton's involvement.

The family concern with children's literature went back to 1787, with two publishing firms of Frederick's great-grandfather and great-great-grandfather, William Darton. He had pioneered the publication of books for children, introducing Ann and Jane Taylor to English schoolchildren.

Darton attended Sutton Valence School and Dover College, and graduated from St John's College, Oxford in 1899 with a degree in classics. While at college, he visited Dorset many times on reading parties, and developed a love of the county that lasted his lifetime.

After graduating, Darton joined the family publishers, Wells Gardner, Darton & Co., becoming a director in 1904. It issued children's magazines as well as books, including The Prize and Chatterbox, which Darton edited from 1901 to 1931. He was behind the firm's publication of John Masefield's Martin Hyde in 1906.

At the time, Wells Gardner, Darton & Co. published compilations of older stories, including reissues of the chapbook The Seven Champions of Christendom (1901) and stories from Chaucer's The Canterbury Tales. In 1906 Darton married Emma Lucretia Bennett, a granddaughter of Sheridan Le Fanu. Together they worked on A Wonder Book of Beasts (1909), in which Emma retold "Reynard the Fox" from a version printed by William Caxton 400 years before. However, their marriage was annulled in 1920.

In 1913 Darton published the first of two novels, My Father's Son, under the pseudonym "W. W. Penn" and "prepared for the press by John Harvey", both names suggesting Darton's Quaker background. His second novel When (1929) was also pseudonymous. The protagonists of both end up in the family book trade, and although they are not autobiographical, they have been described by Margaret Drabble, when investigating Darton, as "darkly illuminating".

== Children's Books in England ==
Darton's masterpiece was Children's Books in England: Five Centuries of Social Life, published in 1932. As he wrote in the preface, "The story of English Children's Books has not yet, so far as I know, been written as a continuous whole, or as a minor chapter in the history of English social life, which is what the present volume is meant to furnish. It has in fact been told only once with any completeness, in Mrs Field's The Child and His Book (1892).

Darton's work drew on his family's 200 years in children's publishing, and his own experience of more than 30 years. As an academic work it did not sell fast, but as Kathleen Lines noted when introducing a second revised edition in 1958, it "slowly found its way into libraries, schools and training schools for librarians." On reprinting the first edition in 2011, Cambridge University Press noted, "Setting children's books in their historical context, the work reflects much about the history of English social life as well as providing an in-depth perspective on the genre.... A classic and authoritative study for anyone interested in the history of children's literature.

Darton noted in his account how Lewis Carroll's Alice in Wonderland books "changed the whole cast of children's literature."

== Later life ==
Darton also wrote about his great love of the English countryside, Dorset in particular. In 1922 came The Marches of Wessex, published in America under a more obvious title, The Soul of Dorset. He followed this up with A Parcel of Kent and returned to Dorset for an article in 1924 in T. P.'s and Cassell's Weekly called "Thomas Hardy's Birthplace".

Darton retired to Cerne Abbas, Dorset, living at the village Red Lion pub for the last two years of his life. His final book, Alibi Pilgrimage, appeared in 1936. It examines the case of Elizabeth Canning, who claimed to have been kidnapped by Gypsies in 1753. Darton tried to confirm the Gypsies' alibi by undertaking long walks through all the counties from Somerset to London. Darton died after a short illness in Dorchester County Hospital, on 26 July 1936, two days after the publication of Alibi Pilgrimage. His obituary in The Times suggested that the arduous walks undertaken in its research contributed to his death.

In a revision of her Children's Books in England in 1958, Kathleen Lines considered it "probably safe to say that Darton will never be supplanted. His interest was life-long and his personal knowledge immense. His opportunities for detailed information about and round the subject were unique, for his family had maintained a continuous connection with publishing for 140 years."

== Bibliography ==
- Tales of the Canterbury Pilgrims: Retold from Chaucer and Others (1904)
- Without Fear and Without Reproach: The Adventures of the Famous Knight Bayard (1905)
- The Merry Tales of the Wise Men Of Gotham (1907). Illustrated by Gordon Browne
- A Wonder Book of Old Romance (1907). Illustrated by A. G. Walker
- Pilgrims' Tales from "Tales of the Canterbury Pilgrims" (1908). Illustrated by Hugh Thomson
- A Wonder Book of Beasts (1909). Illustrated by Margaret Clayton
- The Life and Times of Mrs Sherwood (1775–1851) (1910). Edited
- My Father's Son: a Faithful Record (1913), under the pseudonym W. W. Penn
- Seven Champions of Christendom (1913). Illustrated by Norman Ault
- The London Museum (1914)
- Arnold Bennett [Writers of the Day series] (1915): "a brilliant survey of Arnold Bennett's work, and an estimate of the man"
- The Marches of Wessex (1922, The Soul of Dorset in the United States)
- A Parcel of Kent (1924)
- "Thomas Hardy's Birthplace", in: T. P.'s and Cassell's Weekly (1924)
- Vincent Crummles, his Theatre and his Times (1926)
- English Books 1475–1900: a Signpost for Collectors (1927). With Charles J. Sawyer, another bookseller and publisher
- Reynard the Fox. With E. L. Darton
- When: a Record of Transition (1929), under the name "the late J. L. Pole"
- J. M. Barrie Writers of the Day series (1929)
- The Surprising Adventures of Baron Munchausen (1930). Edited and introduced
- From Surtees to Sassoon: some English contrasts (1838-1928) (1931)
- Children's Books in England: Five Centuries of Social Life (1932)
- English Fabric: A Study Of Village Life (1935)
- Alibi Pilgrimage (1936)
