= Ralph Lazar =

South African artist, author and illustrator

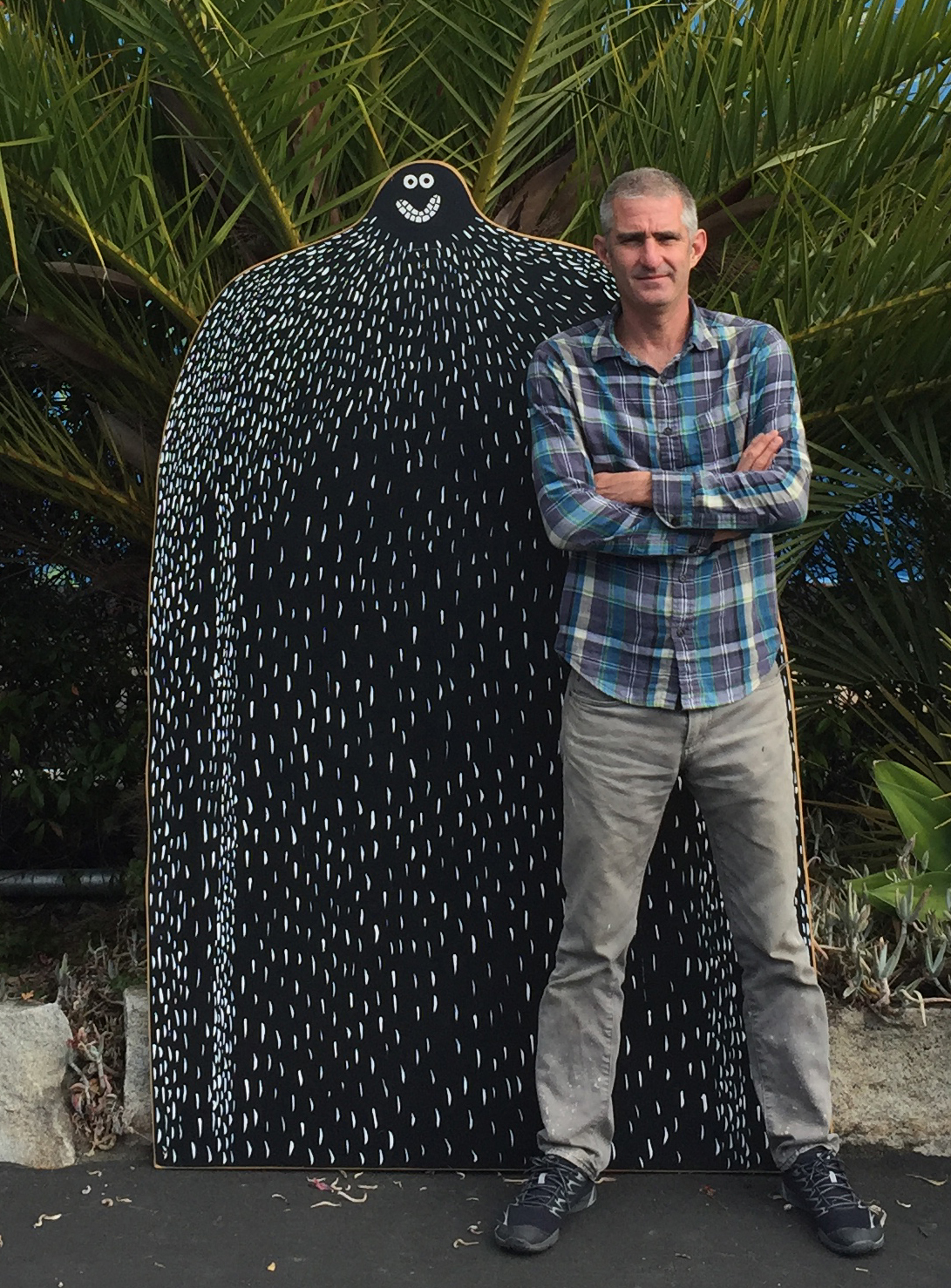
- Ralph Lazar, California, 2016
- Born: 1967 (age 58–59); Johannesburg, South Africa
- Education: University of Cape Town; London School of Economics
- Occupations: Artist, Author, Illustrator
- Spouse: Lisa Swerling
- Parent: Carol Lazar (mother)
- Writing career
- Genres: Art, Illustration
- Notable works: Harold's Planet, Happiness Is, Total Mayhem
- Website: www.ralphlazar.com

Ralph Lazar (born 1967) is a South African artist, author and illustrator. He is known for his collaborations with Lisa Swerling, including Happiness Is and Me Without You, and for the children's book series Total Mayhem. Me Without You appeared on The New York Times Best Seller list in 2015.

== Life ==
Lazar was born in Johannesburg, South Africa, and studied law and economics at the University of Cape Town and the London School of Economics. Before becoming an artist, author and illustrator, he worked as a strategist at Goldman Sachs.

Lazar is married to artist and author Lisa Swerling, with whom he has collaborated on books, cartoons and illustration projects.

== Art ==
Lazar's artwork documents current affairs and historical themes encompassing subjects such as race relations, civil rights, United States presidential history, the Supreme Court of the United States and the United States Constitution.

His work has been exhibited at Art Miami, the LA Art Show, Art Palm Springs and Art Market San Francisco. In 2020, his artwork was displayed on 1,700 LinkNYC digital screens across New York City.

== Illustration and writing ==
Lazar has collaborated extensively with Lisa Swerling. Their projects include Happiness Is, Harold's Planet and Me Without You.

Happiness Is . . . 500 Things to Be Happy About, by Swerling and Lazar, was published by Chronicle Books in 2014. The pair subsequently produced further books in the Happiness Is series, including Happiness Is . . . 500 Ways to Be in the Moment.

Lazar is also the author and illustrator of the children's series Total Mayhem. The first five books were published by Scholastic. He subsequently continued the Dash Candoo stories independently.

Lazar and Swerling also created The Brainwaves, characters used to illustrate a series of children's reference books published by Dorling Kindersley.

Lazar illustrated the seven-volume Rory Branagan: Detective series written by Andrew Clover and published by HarperCollins.

With Swerling, Lazar co-authored Me Without You, which appeared on The New York Times Best Seller list in March 2015.

== Selected works ==
=== Total Mayhem ===
Lazar writes and illustrates the Total Mayhem series. The first five volumes were published by Scholastic.

- Monday: Into the Cave of Thieves (2020)
- Tuesday: The Curse of the Blue Spots (2020)
- Wednesday: The Forest of Secrets (2021)
- Thursday: War of the Waterslides (2022)
- Friday: The Total Ice Cream Meltdown (2022)
- Saturday: Dash Candoo and the Missing Ducks (2022)
- Sunday: Dash Candoo and the Forbidden Island (2022)
- Dash Candoo's Week One Almanac (2022)
- Monday Again: Dash Candoo and the Total Penguin Situation (2023)
- Tuesday Again: Dash Candoo and the Case of the Missing Marble (2023)
- Wednesday Again: Dash Candoo and the Kiting Chaos (2024)
- Thursday Again: Dash Candoo and the Bread Baking Ballyhoo (2024)
- Friday Again: Dash Candoo and the Day That Went Bananas, Volume 1 (2024)
- Friday Again: Dash Candoo and the Day That Went Bananas, Volume 2 (2024)
- Summer Camp: Dash Candoo and the Raft Race (2025)
- Monday Again Again: Dash Candoo and the War of the Hot Dogs (2025)

=== The Adventures of Devil-Cat ===
Lazar is the author of The Adventures of Devil-Cat, an illustrated children's series featuring Devil-Cat, a character who also appears in the Total Mayhem books.

- The Adventures of Devil-Cat: Volume 1 (2023)
- Farty Cola: The Adventures of Devil-Cat, Volume 2 (2023)
- Zebra Milkshakes and Giant Carrots: The Adventures of Devil-Cat, Volume 3 (2023)
- Island Dreams and Other Stories: The Adventures of Devil-Cat, Volume 4 (2024)
- Hair-Gro Potion and Other Stories: The Adventures of Devil-Cat, Volume 5 (2024)

=== Rory Branagan: Detective ===
Lazar illustrated the seven-volume Rory Branagan: Detective series by Andrew Clover, published by HarperCollins.

- Rory Branagan: Detective (2018)
- The Dog Squad (2018)
- The Big Cash Robbery (2018)
- The Deadly Dinner Lady (2019)
- The Leap of Death (2019)
- The Den of Danger (2020)
- The Great Diamond Heist (2021)

=== The Brainwaves ===
Lazar and Lisa Swerling illustrated the Brainwaves reference books for Dorling Kindersley.

- How Nearly Everything Was Invented, written by Jilly MacLeod (2006)
- How the Incredible Human Body Works, written by Richard Walker (2007)
- The Most Stupendous Atlas of the Whole Wide World, written by Simon Adams (2008)
- The Most Explosive Science Book in the Universe, written by Claire Watts (2009)
- The Greatest Intergalactic Guide to Space Ever (2009)
- The Most Brilliant, Boldly Going Book of Exploration Ever, written by Peter Chrisp (2010)

=== Books with Lisa Swerling ===
- Me Without You (2010)
- We Without You
- Happiness Is . . . 500 Things to Be Happy About (2014)
- Friendship Is . . . 500 Reasons to Appreciate Friends (2015)
- Happiness Is . . . 500 Ways to Show I Love You (2016)
- Happiness Is . . . 200 Things I Love About Dad (2017)
- The Sky Is the Limit: A Celebration of All the Things You Can Do (2020)
- My Christmas Wish for You (2021)
- I Love You Like (2022)
