= Happiness Is (cartoon) =

"Happiness Is..." is a book and merchandise series based on the cartoon created by New York Times Bestselling authors. Lisa Swerling & Ralph Lazar, which features a collection of single frame images of "What makes you happy?"

It was launched on Facebook while the couple were living in Sayulita, Mexico, in July 2013. As of July 2020, there were over 10,000 images in the collection, and the Facebook page had over 3.3 million followers.

Chronicle Books of San Francisco holds global book publishing rights to the first 8 titles published from 2014 to 2018.

== Published works in the "Happiness Is...series ==
BOOK 1: HAPPINESS IS...500 Things to be Happy About

- US & Canada: Chronicle Books (2014)
- India: Penguin Books/Random House (2014)
- Italy: Sperling & Kupfer (2014)
- Korea: Indigo (2014)
- Japan: Bunkyosha Co (2015)
- Germany: Fischer Verlag (2015)
- Indonesia: PT Gramedia Pustaka Utama (2015)
- China: United Sky New Media (2015)
- Argentina: Catapulta Editores (2015)
- France: Editions 365 (2016)
- Russia: Kariera Press (2016)
- Hungary: HVG Könyvek (2016)
- Vietnam: AZ Communication (2016)
- Spanish-speaking world excl. Argentina: Plaza y Janes/Penguin Random House (2016)
- Holland: ZNU (2017)
- Bulgaria: Ciela Norma AD (2017)
- Taiwan: Yuan-Liou Publishing (2017)
- Turkey: Pegasus Publishing House (2017)
- Slovakia: Albatros Media (2017)
- Ukraine: Vivat Publishing (2018)
- Saudi Arabia: Jarir (World Arabic rights) (2018)

BOOK 2: FRIENDSHIP IS...500 Reasons to Appreciate Friends

- US & Canada: Chronicle Books (2014)
- Italy: Sperling & Kupfer (2015)
- China: United Sky New Media (2015)
- Argentina: Catapulta Editores (2015)
- Japan: Bunkyosha Co. Ltd. (2015)
- Russia: Kariera Press (2016)
- Germany: Fischer Verlag (2016)
- Indonesia: PT Gramedia Pustaka Utama (2016)
- Vietnam: AZ Communication (2016)
- Spanish-speaking world excl. Argentina: Plaza y Janes/Penguin Random House (2016)
- Holland: ZNU (2017)
- Turkey: Pegasus Publishing House (2017)
- Saudi Arabia: Jarir (World Arabic rights) (2018)

BOOK 3: HAPPINESS IS...500 ways to be in the moment

- US & Canada: Chronicle Books (2016)
- Vietnam: AZ Communication (2016)
- Italy: Sperling & Kupfer (2017)
- Vietnam: AZ Communication (2017)
- Hungary: HVG Könyvek (2018)
- Saudi Arabia: Jarir (World Arabic rights) (2018)
- Taiwan: Yuan-Liou Publishing (2018)

BOOK 4: HAPPINESS IS...500 ways to show I love you

- US & Canada: Chronicle Books (2016)
- Italy: Sperling & Kupfer (2017)
- Vietnam: AZ Communication (2017)
- China: United Sky New Media (2017)
- Bulgaria: Ciela Norma AD (2018)
- Holland: ZNU (2018)
- Saudi Arabia: Jarir (World Arabic rights) (2018)
- Taiwan: Yuan-Liou Publishing (2018)
- Spain: Penguin Random House (2019)
- Hungary: HVG Könyvek (2020)

BOOK 5: HAPPINESS IS...200 things I love about mom

- US & Canada: Chronicle Books (2017)
- Italy: Sperling & Kupfer (2017)

BOOK 6: HAPPINESS IS...200 things I love about dad

- US & Canada: Chronicle Books (2017)
- Italy: Sperling & Kupfer (2018)
- Holland: ZNU (2020)

BOOK 7: HAPPINESS IS...200 ways to be creative

- US & Canada: Chronicle Books (2017)

BOOK 8: HAPPINESS IS...200 celebrations of sisterhood

- US & Canada: Chronicle Books (2018)
- Italy: Sperling & Kupfer (2018)
