= Figures In Motion =

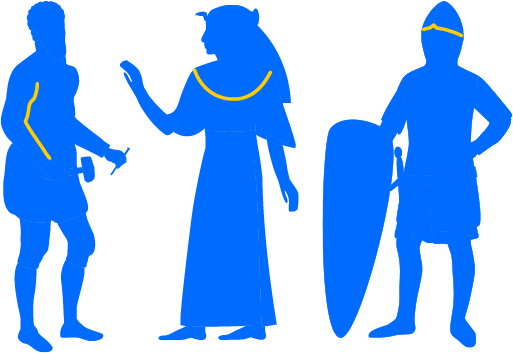
Figures In Motion
- Status: Active
- Founded: 2008
- Country of origin: United States
- Headquarters location: Bellingham, Washington
- Publication types: Children's books
- Official website: https://www.FiguresInMotion.com

Figures In Motion is an independent children's book publisher based in Bellingham, Washington.

== Background ==
Founded in 2008, Figures In Motion publishes interactive educational books for elementary aged children. The books are printed on card stock with illustrations of historic leaders from varying time periods in history. Children color, cut, and assemble movable action figures of historic people.

== Books published ==
Figures in Motion publishes non-fiction books for children ages 6 to 12. Famous Figures of Ancient Times, the first title published, has won multiple awards for design and educational merit. The book begins with the Pharaoh Narmer, an ancient Egyptian king who is credited with the unification of Egypt, and ends with Augustine, a Christian philosopher and theologian.

Other titles in the Famous Figures series include medieval times, the Renaissance, the American Revolution, and the Civil War.
