= Amos Daragon =

Canadian children's book series

- Cover illustrations for Amos Daragon: The Mask Wearer and Amos Daragon: The Key of Braha
- Author: Bryan Perro
- Country: Canada
- Language: French, English translation
- Genre: Fantasy, young adult fiction
- Publisher: French: Les intouchables - English: The Salariya Book Company UK edition
- Published: French: Book One: 2003 - English: Book One: June 2009, Book Two: September 2009

Amos Daragon is a series of fantasy fiction books written by the Québécois writer Bryan Perro. The central story arc focuses on Amos Daragon, a bright and adventurous twelve-year-old, and his quest to become the 'Mask Wearer'. The first English translation of The Mask Wearer was published in June 2009 by Scribo, a division of Book House, an imprint of the Salariya Book Company. The second book, Amos Daragon: The Key of Braha, was published by Scribo in September 2009. The third book, The Twilight of the Gods, was published in January 2010. The fourth book, The Curse of Freyja, was published in Spring 2010. The series has been translated into more than fifteen languages.

== Amos Daragon in other media ==
Amos Daragon has been adapted as a children's animated television series, Les aventures d'Amos Daragon, produced by Montreal-based IceWorks Animation and broadcast on Radio-Canada from September 2016. Le Sanctuaire des Braves (The Sanctuary of the Braves) is a weekend camp for children based on the Amos Daragon world and is located in the municipality of Saint-Mathieu-du-Parc, Quebec. There have also been two shows loosely based on the first, second, third and fourth books.

== List of Amos Daragon titles ==
The series has fifteen volumes, beginning with Amos Daragon: The Mask Wearer.

- Vol. 1. The Mask Wearer (English translation published June 2009)
- Vol. 2. The Key of Braha (English translation published September 2009)
- Vol. 3. The Twilight of the Gods (English translation published January 2010)
- Vol. 4. The Curse of Freyja (English translation published May 2010)
- Vol. 5. The Tower of El-Bab
- Vol. 6. Enki's Wrath
- Vol. 7. Journey in Hell
- Vol. 8. The City of Pegasus
- Vol. 9. The Golden Fleese
- Vol. 10. The Great Crusade
- Vol. 11. The Ether Mask
- Vol. 12. The End of the Gods
- Vol. 13. The Sanctuary of the Braves Part One
- Vol. 14. The Sanctuary of the Braves Part Two
- Vol. 15. The Sanctuary of the Braves Part Three
