= What's Your Poo Telling You? =

Book by Josh Richman

- Author: Josh Richman and Anish Sheth, MD
- Illustrator: Peter Arkle
- Language: English
- Genre: humor and medical
- Publisher: Chronicle Books
- Publication date: June 2007
- Publication place: United States
- Media type: Print (Hardcover)
- Pages: 96 pp (first edition, hardcover)
- ISBN: 0-8118-5782-4 (first edition, hardcover)
- OCLC: 829960587
- Dewey Decimal: 612.3/6 22
- LC Class: QP159 .R53 2007

What's Your Poo Telling You? is a book for adults describing different aspects of human flatulence, defecation, diarrhea, and various feces-related phenomena. The book sold well upon its release and in 2009 the book was reported to have sold over 400,000 copies.

It was authored by Josh Richman and gastroenterologist Anish Sheth, M.D. It includes diagrams provided by illustrator Peter Arkle. The book was followed up by two companion pieces, What's My Pee Telling Me? (2009) and What's Your Baby's Poo Telling You? (2014). Merchandise tie-ins for the series include a daily calendar, log, mobile app, and an activity book.

== Bibliography ==
- What's Your Poo Telling You? (2007, Chronicle Books)
- What's My Pee Telling Me? (2009, Chronicle Books)
- What's Your Baby's Poo Telling You? (2014, Chronicle Books)
