= Whitaker House =

Christian publishing company

- Parent company: Whitaker Corporation
- Status: Active
- Founded: 1970; 56 years ago
- Founder: Robert E. Whitaker, Sr.
- Country of origin: United States
- Headquarters location: New Kensington, Pennsylvania
- Distribution: Anchor Distributors
- Key people: Robert Whitker, Jr., President
- Publication types: Books
- Nonfiction topics: Christian literature Children's literature
- Official website: whitakerhouse.com smartkidzbooks.com

Whitaker House is a Christian publishing house in New Kensington, Pennsylvania, near Pittsburgh. It was founded by Robert E. Whitaker, Sr. Upon his death in 2012, his son Robert Whitaker Jr. became president.

Their stated mission is "To advance God's kingdom by providing biblically based products that proclaim the power of the gospel and minister to the spiritual needs of people around the world."

The distribution arm of the business is called Anchor Distributors.

In 2018, Whitaker House's parent company, Whitaker Corporation, acquired the children's book publisher Smart Kidz Books.
