= J. Otto Seibold =

American artist and children's book creator

James Otto Seibold (born 1960) is an American artist and children's book creator. With no formal art training, he was able to sneak into the art world during the "outsider art" craze of the 1990s. His book Mr. Lunch Takes a Plane Ride, published by Viking in 1993, was the first children's picture book to be created with digital media. His 1997 book Olive, the Other Reindeer led to an animated television special of the same name.

His art has been shown at Mass MOCA, Deitch Projects NYC, The Getty LA, Contemporary Jewish Museum SF, Grass Hut Portland, MOCA LA, The Yerba Buena Center for the Arts SF, Gallery Paule Anglim SF, Oakland Museum CA, Juxtapoz Gallery Detroit, and Galerie Impare in Paris. He has done freelance illustration for clients such as Nike, Time Warner, Girl Skateboards, Pixar, Comcast, Giant Robot, Target, TiVo, 826 Detroit, Quaker Oats, Fox Entertainment, Gnu Skateboards, Swatch, and Nordstrom.

His book Penguin Dreams was named by The New York Times one of the 10 best illustrated books of 1999. Mr. Lunch Takes a Plane Ride won a Cuffie Award from Publishers Weekly; Mr. Lunch won for most memorable character in a lead role. Going to the Getty won an Art Directors Club Illustration Award. Olive, the Other Reindeer was a New York Times Bestseller and the movie version was nominated for an Emmy Award.

Seibold has three children and resides in Oakland, California.

== Books illustrated ==
=== Illustrated by J.otto Seibold and written by Vivian Walsh ===
- Mr. Lunch Takes a Plane Ride (1993)
- Mr. Lunch Borrows a Canoe (1994)
- Monkey Business (1995)
- Free Lunch (1996)
- Going to the Getty (1997)
- Olive, The Other Reindeer (1997)
- Penguin Dreams (1999)
- Gluey: A Snail Tale (2002)
- Olive, My Love (2004)

=== Written by Richard Wilbur ===
- The Pig in the Spigot (2000)

=== Written by Lewis Carroll ===
- Alice in (pop-up) Wonderland (2003)

=== Written by J.otto Seibold ===
- Quincy, the Hobby Photographer (2006)
- The Fuchsia Is Now (2006)
- Other Goose (2010)
- Count, Dagmar! (2011)
- Lost Sloth (2013)

=== Written by J. Otto Seibold and Siobhan Vivian ===
- Vunce Upon a Time (2008)
