= Chronicle Books =

American book publisher

- Parent company: McEvoy Group
- Founded: 1967; 58 years ago
- Founder: Phelps Dewey
- Country of origin: United States
- Headquarters location: San Francisco, California
- Distribution: Hachette Client Services (US); Raincoast Books (Canada); Hardie Grant Books (Australia); Bookreps NZ (New Zealand); Jonathan Ball Publishers (South Africa); Abrams & Chronicle Books (UK)
- Publication types: Books, calendars
- Imprints: Chronicle Prism Chronicle Chroma Handprint Books
- Official website: chroniclebooks.com

Chronicle Books is a San Francisco–based American publishing company that publishes books for both adults and children.

== History ==
The company was established in 1967 by Phelps Dewey, an executive with Chronicle Publishing Company, then-publisher of the San Francisco Chronicle. In 1999 it was bought by Nion McEvoy, great-grandson of M. H. de Young, founder of the Chronicle, from other family members who were selling off the company's assets. At the time Chronicle Books had a staff of 130 and published 300 books per year, with a catalog of more than 1,000 books.

In 2000, McEvoy set up the McEvoy Group as a holding company. In 2008, Chronicle acquired Handprint Books.

== Publications ==
Chronicle Books publishes books in subjects such as architecture, art, culture, interior design, cooking, children's books, gardening, pop culture, fiction, food, travel, and photography.

It has published a number of New York Times Best Sellers; the Griffin and Sabine series by Nick Bantock, Me Without You by Lisa Swerling and Ralph Lazar, Duck! Rabbit! by Amy Krouse Rosenthal and Olive, the Other Reindeer by Vivian Walsh.

Other best sellers have included The Beatles Anthology, What's Your Poo Telling You?, Mom and Dad are Palindromes by Mark Shulman, the Worst-Case Scenario series by Joshua Piven and David Borgenicht, the children's series Ivy and Bean by Annie Barrows, All My Friends Are Dead, and Papa, Do You Love Me and Golden Kite Award winner Mama, Do You Love Me by Barbara M. Joosse. In March 2006 the company published Between the Bridge and the River, a novel by Craig Ferguson.

Chronicle Books has published at least 25 books in The Art of... series that showcase the evolution of artwork and stories of animated films, including many by Walt Disney Animation Studios, Pixar, DreamWorks and Blue Sky Studios.

The company also sells custom publishing service and gift accessories (such as desktop calendars), and operates three retail stores in San Francisco – including one in the base of their corporate headquarters near AT&T Park.

In 2017 and 2018, Chronicle published Star Trek Cats and Star Trek: The Next Generation Cats by Jey Parks.

== McEvoy Group ==
In addition to Chronicle Books, McEvoy Group also owns:

- Princeton Architectural Press
- Galison/Mudpuppy, acquired in 2012
  - Galison, a stationery and gifts publisher
  - Mudpuppy, a publisher of puzzles, games, and toys
- I See Me!, a publisher of personalized books acquired in 2014

In 2006 the McEvoy Group purchased Spin magazine in connection with the owners of San Francisco's 7x7 magazine and California Home+Design. McEvoy sold off the magazines by 2014.

== See also ==
- Category:Chronicle Books books
