= The Art of... =

Book series

The Art of... is a series of art books which showcase the evolution of artwork throughout the development of popular and critically acclaimed animated films and series. They have been published by different companies including Chronicle Books, Viz Media, Disney Editions and Hyperion Books.

The books have generally been highly praised and considered essential coffee table merchandise to supplement their respective films.

== Titles ==
=== Films ===
Title	Author	Year Published	Publisher	Film/Work	Studio/Creator
Snow White and the Seven Dwarfs: The Art and Creation of Walt Disney's Classic Animated Film	J. B. Kaufman	2012	Walt Disney Family Foundation Press	Snow White and the Seven Dwarfs (1937)	Disney
The Art of the Little Mermaid	Jeff Kurtti	1997	Hyperion Books	The Little Mermaid (1989)	Disney
Tale as Old as Time: The Art and Making of Beauty and the Beast	Charles Solomon	2010	Disney Editions	Beauty and the Beast (1991)	Disney
Disney's Aladdin: The Making of an Animated Film	John Culhane	1993	Disney Editions	Aladdin (1992)	Disney
The Art of The Lion King	Christopher Finch	1994	Hyperion Books	The Lion King (1994)	Disney
The Art of Pocahontas	Stephen Rebello	1995	Hyperion Books	Pocahontas (1995)	Disney
The Disney That Never Was: The Stories and Art of Five Decades of Unproduced Animation	Charles Solomon	1995	Hyperion Books		Disney
The Art of The Hunchback of Notre Dame	Stephen Rebello	1996	Hyperion Books	The Hunchback of Notre Dame (1996)	Disney
The Art of Hercules: The Chaos of Creation	Stephen Rebello	1997	Hyperion Books	Hercules (1997)	Disney
The Art of Mulan	Jeff Kurtti	1998	Hyperion Books	Mulan (1998)	Disney
Tarzan Chronicles	Howard E. Green	1999	Disney Editions	Tarzan (1999)	Disney
Fantasia 2000 : Visions of Hope	John Culhane	1999	Disney Editions	Fantasia 2000 (1999)	Disney
Dinosaur: The Evolution of an Animated Feature	Jeff Kurtti	2000	Disney Editions	Dinosaur (2000)	Disney
Atlantis: The Lost Empire: The Illustrated Script	Jeff Kurtti	2001	Disney Editions	Atlantis: The Lost Empire (2001)	Disney
Treasure Planet: A Voyage of Discovery	Jeff Kurtti	2002	Disney Editions	Treasure Planet (2002)	Disney
Brother Bear: A Transformation Tale	Wendy Lefkon	2003	Hyperion Books	Brother Bear (2003)	Disney
The Art of Meet the Robinsons	Tracey Miller-Zarneke	2007	Disney Editions	Meet the Robinsons (2007)	Disney
The Art of Bolt	Mark Cotta Vaz	2008	Chronicle Books	Bolt (2008)	Disney
The Art of The Princess and the Frog	Jeff Kurtti	2009	Chronicle Books	The Princess and the Frog (2009)	Disney
The Art of Tangled	Jeff Kurtti	2010	Chronicle Books	Tangled (2010)	Disney
Frankenweenie: The Visual Companion	Mark Salisbury	2013	Disney Editions	Frankenweenie (2012)	Disney
The Art of Wreck-It Ralph	Jennifer Lee & Maggie Malone	2012	Chronicle Books	Wreck-It Ralph (2012)	Disney
The Art of Frozen	Charles Solomon	2013	Chronicle Books	Frozen (2013)	Disney
The Art of Big Hero 6	Jessica Julius	2014	Chronicle Books	Big Hero 6 (2014)	Disney
The Art of Zootopia	Jessica Julius	2016	Chronicle Books	Zootopia (2016)	Disney
The Art of Moana	Jessica Julius & Maggie Malone	2016	Chronicle Books	Moana (2016)	Disney
The Art of Planes	Tracey Miller-Zarneke	2014	Chronicle Books	Planes (2013)	DisneyToon Studios
The Art of Ralph Breaks the Internet	Jessica Julius	2018	Chronicle Books	Ralph Breaks the Internet (2018)	Disney
The Art of Frozen II	Jessica Julius	2019	Chronicle Books	Frozen II (2019)	Disney
The Art of Raya and the Last Dragon	Osnat Shurer & Kaliko Hurley	2021	Chronicle Books	Raya and the Last Dragon (2021)	Disney
The Art of Encanto	Juan Pablo Reyes Lancaster Jones	2021	Chronicle Books	Encanto (2021)	Disney
The Art of Strange World	Juan Pablo Reyes Lancaster Jones & Kalikolehua Hurley	2022	Chronicle Books	Strange World (2022)	Disney
The Prince of Egypt: A New Vision in Animation	Charles Solomon	1998	Harry N. Abrams	The Prince of Egypt (1998)	DreamWorks
Shrek: From the Swamp to the Screen	John Hopkins	2004	Harry N. Abrams	Shrek (2001)	DreamWorks
The Art of Bee Movie	Jerry Beck	2007	Chronicle Books	Bee Movie (2007)	DreamWorks
The Art of Kung Fu Panda	Tracey Miller-Zarneke	2008	Insight Editions	Kung Fu Panda (2008)	DreamWorks
The Art of Dreamworks Madagascar: Escape 2 Africa	Jerry Beck	2008	Insight Editions	Madagascar: Escape 2 Africa (2008)	DreamWorks
The Art of Monsters vs. Aliens	Linda Sunshine	2009	Newmarket Press	Monsters vs. Aliens (2009)	DreamWorks
The Art of How to Train Your Dragon	Tracey Miller-Zarneke	2010	Newmarket Press	How to Train Your Dragon (2010)	DreamWorks
The Art of Shrek Forever After	Jerry Schmitz	2010	Insight Editions	Shrek Forever After (2010)	DreamWorks
The Art of DreamWorks Megamind: Bad, Brilliant, Blue	Richard von Busack	2010	Insight Editions	Megamind (2010)	DreamWorks
The Art of Kung Fu Panda 2	Tracey Miller-Zarneke	2011	Insight Editions	Kung Fu Panda 2 (2011)	DreamWorks
The Art of Puss in Boots	Ramin Zahed	2011	Insight Editions	Puss in Boots (2011 film) (2011)	DreamWorks
The Art of Rise of the Guardians	Ramin Zahed	2012	Insight Editions	Rise of the Guardians (2012)	DreamWorks
The Art of Turbo	Robert Abele	2013	Insight Editions	Turbo (2013)	DreamWorks
The Art of The Croods	Noela Hueso	2013	Titan Books	The Croods (2013)	DreamWorks
The Art of Mr. Peabody & Sherman	Jerry Beck	2014	Insight Editions	Mr. Peabody & Sherman (2014)	DreamWorks
The Art of Penguins of Madagascar	Barbara Robertson	2014	Insight Editions	Penguins of Madagascar (2014)	DreamWorks
The Art of How to Train Your Dragon 2	Linda Sunshine	2014	Dey Street Books	How to Train Your Dragon 2 (2014)	DreamWorks
The Art of DreamWorks Animation: Celebrating 20 Years of Art	Ramin Zahed	2014	Harry N. Abrams		DreamWorks
The Art of Home	Ramin Zahed	2015	Insight Editions	Home (2015)	DreamWorks
The Art of Kung Fu Panda 3	Tracey Miller-Zarneke	2016	Insight Editions	Kung Fu Panda 3 (2016)	DreamWorks
The Art of Trolls	Jerry Schmitz	2016	Cameron + Company	Trolls (2016)	DreamWorks
The Art of The Boss Baby	Ramin Zahed	2017	Insight Editions	The Boss Baby (2017)	DreamWorks
The Art of Captain Underpants: The First Epic Movie	Ramin Zahed	2017	Insight Editions	Captain Underpants: The First Epic Movie (2017)	DreamWorks
The Art of Abominable	Bonnie Burton	2019	Cameron + Company	Abominable (2019)	DreamWorks
The Art of How to Train Your Dragon: The Hidden World	Linda Sunshine	2019	Dark Horse Books	How to Train Your Dragon: The Hidden World (2019)	DreamWorks
The Art of Spirit Untamed	Bonnie Burton	2021	Cameron + Company	Spirit Untamed (2021)	DreamWorks
The Art of The Bad Guys	Iain R. Morris	2022	Cameron + Company	The Bad Guys (2022)	DreamWorks
The Art of Puss in Boots: The Last Wish	Ramin Zahed	2023	Harry N. Abrams	Puss in Boots: The Last Wish (2023)	DreamWorks
Toy Story The Art and Making of the Animated Film	John Lasseter & Steve Daly	1995	Disney Editions	Toy Story (1995)	Pixar
A Bug's Life: The Art and Making of an Epic of Miniature Proportions	Jeff Kurtti	1998	Disney Editions	A Bug's Life (1998)	Pixar
The Toy Story Films: An Animated Journey	Charles Solomon	2012	Disney Editions	Toy Story	Pixar
The Art of Monsters, Inc.	John Lasseter and Pete Docter	2001	Chronicle Books	Monsters, Inc. (2001)	Pixar
The Art of Finding Nemo	Mark Cotta Vaz	2003	Chronicle Books	Finding Nemo (2003)	Pixar
The Art of The Incredibles	Mark Cotta Vaz	2004	Chronicle Books	The Incredibles (2004)	Pixar
The Art of Cars	Suzanne Fitgerald Wallis & Michael Wallis	2006	Chronicle Books	Cars (2006)	Pixar
Art of Ratatouille	Karen M. Paik	2007	Chronicle Books	Ratatouille (2007)	Pixar
The Art of WALLE	Tim Hauser	2008	Chronicle Books	WALL-E (2008)	Pixar
The Art of Pixar Short Films	Amid Amidi	2009	Chronicle Books		Pixar
The Art of Up	Tim Hauser	2009	Chronicle Books	Up (2009)	Pixar
The Art of Toy Story 3	Charles Solomon	2010	Chronicle Books	Toy Story 3 (2010)	Pixar
The Art of Cars 2	Ben Queen	2011	Chronicle Books	Cars 2 (2011)	Pixar
The Art of Brave	Jenny Lerew	2012	Chronicle Books	Brave (2012)	Pixar
The Art of Monsters University	Karen Paik	2013	Chronicle Books	Monsters University (2013)	Pixar
The Art Of Inside Out	Pete Docter	2015	Chronicle Books	Inside Out (2015)	Pixar
The Art of The Good Dinosaur	Peter Sohn	2015	Chronicle Books	The Good Dinosaur (2015)	Pixar
The Art of Finding Dory	John Lasseter	2016	Chronicle Books	Finding Dory (2016)	Pixar
The Art of Cars 3	John Lasseter	2017	Chronicle Books	Cars 3 (2017)	Pixar
The Art of Coco	John Lasseter	2017	Chronicle Books	Coco (2017)	Pixar
The Art of Incredibles 2	Karen Paik	2018	Chronicle Books	Incredibles 2 (2018)	Pixar
The Art of Toy Story 4	Josh Cooley	2019	Chronicle Books	Toy Story 4 (2019)	Pixar
The Art of Onward	Dan Scanlon	2020	Chronicle Books	Onward (2020)	Pixar
The Art of Soul	Pete Docter	2020	Chronicle Books	Soul (2020)	Pixar
The Art of Pixar: 25th Anniv.: The Complete Color Scripts and Select Art from 25 Years of Animation	Amid Amidi	2011	Chronicle Books		Pixar
The Art of Luca	Enrico Casarosa	2021	Chronicle Books	Luca (2021)	Pixar
The Art of Turning Red	Pete Docter	2022	Chronicle Books	Turning Red (2022)	Pixar
The Art of Lightyear	Andrew Stanton	2022	Chronicle Books	Lightyear (2022)	Pixar
The Art of Elemental	Pete Docter	2023	Chronicle Books	Elemental (2023)	Pixar
The Art of Inside Out 2	Pete Docter	2024	Chronicle Books	Inside Out 2 (2024)	Pixar
The Art of Elio	Pete Docter	2025	Chronicle Books	Elio (2025)	Pixar
The Art of Robots	Amid Amidi	2005	Chronicle Books	Robots (2005)	Blue Sky Studios
The Art of Epic	Tara Bennett	2013	Titan Books	Epic (2013)	Blue Sky Studios
The Art of Rio: Featuring a Carnival of Art From Rio and Rio 2	Tara Bennett	2014	Titan Books	Rio (2011) and Rio 2 (2014)	Blue Sky Studios
The Art of Blue Sky Studios	Jake S. Friedman	2014	Insight Editions		Blue Sky Studios
The Art and Making of The Peanuts Movie	Jerry Schmitz	2015	Titan Books	The Peanuts Movie (2015)	Blue Sky Studios
The Art of Ferdinand	Tara Bennett	2017	Titan Books	Ferdinand (2017)	Blue Sky Studios
The Art of Spies in Disguise	Troy Quane	2019	Titan Books	Spies in Disguise (2019)	Blue Sky Studios
The Art of Open Season	Linda Sunshine	2006	Insight Editions	Open Season (2006)	Sony Pictures Animation
The Art of Arthur Christmas	Linda Sunshine	2011	Newmarket Press	Arthur Christmas (2011)	Aardman Animations, Sony Pictures Animation
The Art and Making of Hotel Transylvania	Tracey Miller-Zarneke	2012	Titan Books	Hotel Transylvania (2012)	Sony Pictures Animation
The Art of Cloudy with a Chance of Meatballs 2: Revenge of the Leftovers	Tracey Miller-Zarneke	2013	Cameron + Company	Cloudy with a Chance of Meatballs 2 (2013)	Sony Pictures Animation
The Art and Making of Hotel Transylvania 2	Brett Rector	2015	Titan Books	Hotel Transylvania 2 (2015)	Sony Pictures Animation
The Art of Smurfs: The Lost Village	Tracey Miller-Zarneke	2017	Cameron Books	Smurfs: The Lost Village (2017)	Sony Pictures Animation
Spider-Man: Into the Spider-Verse: The Art of the Animated Movie	Ramin Zahed	2018	Titan Books	Spider-Man: Into the Spider-Verse (2018)	Marvel, Sony Pictures Animation
The Art of The Mitchells vs. The Machines	Ramin Zahed	2021	Harry N. Abrams	The Mitchells vs. The Machines (2021)	Sony Pictures Animation
The Art of VIVO	Ramin Zahed	2021	Harry N. Abrams	Vivo (2021)	Sony Pictures Animation
Spider-Man: Across the Spider-Verse: The Art of the Movie	Ramin Zahed	2023	Titan Books	Spider-Man: Across the Spider-Verse (2023)	Marvel, Sony Pictures Animation
The Art of The Angry Birds Movie	Jim Sorenson	2016	IDW Publishing	The Angry Birds Movie	Rovio Animation
The Art of The Book of Life	Jorge Gutierrez	2014	Dark Horse Books	The Book of Life (2014)	Reel FX Creative Studios
The Art and Making of Peanuts Animation: Celebrating Fifty Years of Television Specials	Charles Solomon	2012	Chronicle Books	Peanuts	Charles M. Schulz
The Art of Spirited Away	Hayao Miyazaki	2002	Viz Media	Spirited Away (2001)	Studio Ghibli
The Art of My Neighbor Totoro	Hayao Miyazaki	2005	Viz Media	My Neighbor Totoro (1988)	Studio Ghibli
The Art of Howl's Moving Castle	Hayao Miyazaki	2005	Viz Media	Howl's Moving Castle (2004)	Studio Ghibli
The Art of Porco Rosso	Hayao Miyazaki	2005	Viz Media	Porco Rosso (1992)	Studio Ghibli
The Art of Kiki's Delivery Service	Hayao Miyazaki	2006	Viz Media	Kiki's Delivery Service (1989)	Studio Ghibli
The Art of Ponyo	Hayao Miyazaki	2009	Viz Media	Ponyo (2008)	Studio Ghibli
The Art of Princess Mononoke	Hayao Miyazaki	2009	Viz Media	Princess Mononoke (1997)	Studio Ghibli
The Art of the Secret World of Arrietty	Hiromasa Yonebayashi	2012	Viz Media	Arrietty (2010)	Studio Ghibli
The Art of the Wind Rises	Hayao Miyazaki	2014	Viz Media	The Wind Rises (2013)	Studio Ghibli
The Art and Making of ParaNorman	Jed Alger	2012	Chronicle Books	ParaNorman (2012)	Laika
The Art of The Boxtrolls	Phil Brotherton	2014	Chronicle Books	The Boxtrolls (2014)	Laika
The Art of Kubo and the Two Strings	Emily Haynes	2016	Chronicle Books	Kubo and the Two Strings (2016)	Laika
The Art of Missing Link	Ramin Zahed	2019	Insight Editions	Missing Link (2019)	Laika
The Ballad of Rango: The Art and Making of an Outlaw Film	David S. Cohen	2011	Insight Editions	Rango (2011)	Nickelodeon Movies
The Art of My Little Pony: The Movie	Rebecca Dart	2017	Viz Media	My Little Pony: The Movie (2017)	DHX Media/Hasbro Studios
The Art of Anastasia: A Twentieth Century Fox Presentation	Harvey Deneroff	1997	HarperCollins	Anastasia (1997)	Fox Animation Studios
The Art of Planet 51	Danny Graydon	2009	Insight Editions	Planet 51 (2009)	Ilion Animation Studios
Song of the Sea Artbook	Tomm Moore	2014	Cartoon Saloon	Song of the Sea (2014)	Cartoon Saloon
The Art of Wolfwalkers	Charles Solomon	2020	Cartoon Saloon	Wolfwalkers (2020)	Cartoon Saloon
The Art of Eric Guillon: From the Making of Despicable Me to Minions, The Secret Life of Pets, and More	Ben Croll	2022	Insight Editions		Illumination
The Art and Making of Luck	Noela Hueso	2022	Titan Books	Luck (2022)	Skydance Animation
Rumble: The Art and Making of the Movie	Noela Hueso	2021	Titan Books	Rumble (2021)	Paramount Animation
The Art of The Addams Family	Ramin Zahed	2019	Titan Books	The Addams Family (2019)	Metro-Goldwyn-Mayer
Klaus: The Art of the Movie	Ramin Zahed	2019	Titan Books	Klaus (2019)	Netflix Animation
Over the Moon: Illuminating the Journey	Leonard Maltin	2020	Titan Books	Over the Moon (2020)	Netflix Animation
The LEGO Batman Movie: The Making of the Movie	Tracey Miller-Zarneke	2017	DK Children	The Lego Batman Movie (2017)	Warner Bros. Animation
The Art of Steven Universe: The Movie	Rebecca Sugar, Kat Morris & Takafumi Hori	2019	Dark Horse Books	Steven Universe: The Movie (2019)	Cartoon Network Studios
The Wes Anderson Collection: Isle of Dogs	Lauren Wilford	2018	Abrams Books	Isle of Dogs (2018)	Studio Babelsberg
The Little Prince: The Art of the Movie	Ramin Zahed	2016	Titan Books	The Little Prince (2015)	M6 Films

=== Series ===
Title	Author	Year Published	Publisher	Series/Work	Studio/Creator
My Little Pony: The Art of Equestria	Mary Jane Begin	2015	Abrams Books	My Little Pony: Friendship is Magic (2010–2019)	DHX Media/Hasbro Studios
Avatar: The Last Airbender: The Art of the Animated Series	Michael Dante DiMartino & Bryan Konietzko	2010	Dark Horse Comics	Avatar: The Last Airbender (2005–2008)	Nickelodeon
The Legend of Korra: The Art of the Animated Series	Michael Dante DiMartino, Bryan Konietzko & Joaquim Dos Santos	2013-2015	Dark Horse Comics	The Legend of Korra (2012–2014)	Nickelodeon

== Critical reception ==
The Animation World Network described The Art of DreamWorks Animation as "a breathtakingly lovely catalogue of every animated film that...is like a tour through the Louvre of modern cinematic animation". Indiwire explained that the Home edition, in contrast to the other books in The Art Of... series contains "finished artwork or very late concept work [which] is at least equal to art from prototypical and developmental stages." Rotoscopers noted that art books in the series "are usually also ‘making of’ books that teach the reader about how a movie was made." Due to the sheer number of The Art of... titles, Martin Godman of Animation Scoop wrote "When I review an “Art Of” book today, I tend to look at what sets the book apart from similar products; a difference that makes the book worth adding to a library and perusing years after the film itself has departed the theaters."
