= Vivian Walsh (author) =

American writer

Vivian Walsh is an American author of children's picture books. She is best known for her book Olive, the Other Reindeer, which was adapted into a 1999 animated television special featuring the voice of Drew Barrymore. The special was produced by Barrymore and Matt Groening, creator of The Simpsons.

Walsh has collaborated with the illustrator J. Otto Seibold. The two have written books such as Penguin Dreams, which was named a New York Times "Best Illustrated Book". Mr. Lunch Takes a Plane Ride won a Cuffie Award from Publishers Weekly; Mr. Lunch won for most memorable character in a lead role. Olive, the Other Reindeer was a New York Times Bestseller, and the movie version was nominated for an Emmy Award.

== Selected works ==
- Mr. Lunch Takes a Plane Ride (1993), Viking Penguin
- Mr. Lunch Borrows a Canoe (1994), Viking Penguin
- Monkey Business (1995), Viking Penguin
- Free Lunch (1996), Viking Penguin
- Going to the Getty (1997), Getty Books
- Olive, The Other Reindeer (1997), Chronicle Books
- Penguin Dreams (1999), Chronicle Books
- Gluey (2002), Harcourt Children's Books
- Olive, My Love (2004), Harcourt Children's Books
- June and August (2009), Abrams

== Television ==
- Olive, the Other Reindeer (1999) Fox Films, see IMDb
