= Beaver's Pond Press =

Publishing Company

- Founded: 1998
- Founder: Milt "Beaver" Adams
- Country of origin: USA
- Headquarters location: Saint Paul, Minnesota
- Publication types: Books

Beaver's Pond Press is a hybrid publishing company based in Saint Paul, Minnesota that publishes independent authors and artists. Combining elements of royalty and self-publishing models to create what they term a “mentoring press,” Beaver's Pond Press is known for their personal interactions and creative approach to publishing.

Publishing approximately twenty-five children's books a year, Beaver's Pond Press partners with dozens of cartoonists and illustrators. They also publish a number of fiction and nonfiction books, including memoirs and cookbooks.

== Books and Authors ==
Since Beaver's Pond Press was founded in 1998 by Milt “Beaver” Adams, they have published almost 1,000 books.

Their titles have been endorsed by people such as Bill Clinton and Garrison Keillor, and recognized by organizations such as the Writer's Digest, Moonbeam Awards, and IBPA Benjamin Franklin Awards.

Beaver's Pond authors retain the full rights to their books, and notable authors that have first self-published through Beaver's Pond and then gone on to secure royalty-publishing deals include Pockets of Joy by Roxane Battle (a #1 Amazon bestseller in the Single Parents category, endorsed by Tavis Smiley, now published by Whitaker House) and Tell My Sons by Lt. Col. Mark M. Weber (with a foreword by Robin Williams, now published by Penguin Random House).
