= Sang-Froid: Tales of Werewolves =

2013 video game

- Developer: Artifice Studio
- Publisher: Artifice Studio
- Engine: Virtools
- Platform: Windows
- Release: April 5th, 2013
- Genres: Strategy; Action; Tower defense; RPG

Sang-Froid: Tales of Werewolves is a strategy video game developed by Canadian company Artifice Studio. It is an action-strategy game, with tower defense and RPG elements. Sang-Froid was part of Steam Greenlight, and was officially greenlit on November 30, 2012. Sang-Froid is heavily influenced by Canadian and Native American folklore, while also staying true to the history of the time. The story is co-written with best-selling Canadian author Bryan Perro, and features the likes of the Devil, Werewolves, Will o' the Wisp and other such creatures of legend.

== Synopsis ==
A tale of werewolves transports players into 19th century Canada, a land of legend populated with Will-O'-the-Wisps, Windigos and Werewolves, in which two feuding brothers will have to put aside their differences to save their sister, who is pursued by the Devil himself.

== Gameplay ==
Sang-Froid: Tales of Werewolves is a variant of a tower defense game. The player, taking control of one of the two O'Carroll brothers, must protect their forest from the onslaught of werewolves and other folkloric creatures that the Devil is sending at them on a nightly bases. Taking place over three weeks in the month of December, each chapter consists of a day and night cycle.

During the day, Sang-Froid plays like a typical tower defense game. The player has a top down view of the forest, and must place traps in order to defend the buildings in the area. Each trap costs Action Points or AP, and some cost money as well. The player gets additional AP for every building they must defend over the course of the game. The player has a plethora of information at their disposal to help plan an appropriate strategy for every chapter such as; types of enemies, size of enemy packs, pack target and path, enemy health, trap damage, etc. Players can also visit the local villages to purchase goods and services from the shops like a new axe or musket.

During the night, the player takes control of their selected hero, and can run around the forest from a 3rd person perspective. A night can consist of 1-6 waves, each wave consisting of any number of enemies. The player has an axe along with a musket that is muzzle loaded. Players must interact with certain traps, while others are automatic. Melee combat includes a Fear Factor or FF mechanic, which represents the amount of intimidation the player has over enemies: as long as they fear the player, they will not attack. FF is represented by a sliding bar on the HUD, and acts as a physical representation for the enemy's next attack. Another mechanic during the night is the wind: players must keep track of it so they do not get detected by enemies. Midway through the game, players also obtain an item allowing them to manipulate the wind to help lure enemies to traps.

Once finishing off a wave, the next wave will commence, and so on until the end of the night. If any of the waves destroy one of the player's buildings they fail the night. Players are rewarded with XP for completing waves, and money in exchange for the pelts of enemies defeated. Upon leveling up with XP gains, players are awarded a skill point, which is used in an extensive skill tree, players can cater their hero to the style of play they choose

== Release and reception ==
Reception

Aggregate scores
Aggregator	Score
GameRankings	(PC) 81.83%
Metacritic	(PC) 79/100

Review scores
Publication	Score
Eurogamer	9/10
GameSpot	7.5/10

Sang-Froid was officially released for PC on Steam on April 5, 2013. Upon release, Sang-Froid received generally favorable reviews from video game publications. At the review aggregate websites GameRankings and Metacritic, the game holds an average review score of 81.83% and 79 out of 100 respectively. Sang-Froid was praised for its soundtrack, one reviewer stating "...the music is fantastic, with a Celtic influence throughout complete with pipes and flutes. It's the sort of music I have never heard in any game before, and it's amazing to see it work so well."

While the innovative gameplay is generally praised, there is some criticism of a certain "handicraft roughness". One reviewer went as far as to say it is "incredibly ugly", and it has "ugly, frayed, and at times blatantly rough edges", but the same reviewer was also able to say that it is "unlike anything I have ever played, it is novel, intelligent, and at times even a subliminal experience".
