= Hogs Back Books =

UK children's book publisher

- Founded: 2010
- Founder: Karen Stevens and Tom Stevens
- Country of origin: United Kingdom
- Headquarters location: Guildford, Surrey
- Distribution: Central Books Ltd
- Publication types: Children's Books
- Official website: www.hogsbackbooks.com

Hogs Back Books Ltd is a family independent children's book publisher based in Guildford, Surrey (UK).

== History ==
Hogs Back Books was founded in 2010 by Karen Stevens, a former medical journalist, and Tom Stevens, a former civil engineer. The company name comes from its location on the Hog's Back, a ridge of chalk that lies between Guildford and Farnham in Surrey.

With its pig's snout logo and its motto “a nose for a good book...”, Hogs Back Books publishes books from newcomers, and sells them through various retail outlets, including non-mainstream ones such as farm shops and art galleries (Tate Modern). They have also partnered with Loch Fyne, the fish restaurant chain. In 2013, they teamed up with Inpress Books, a sales and marketing agency for independent publishers in the UK supported by Arts Council England and specialising in literary fiction and poetry.

== Books published ==
Hogs Back Books publishes fiction books aimed to children up to 10. Amongst its most notable titles, Boris the Boastful Frog was recommended by The Telegraph in 2013 as one of the best books of the year for young children.

For the release of the title O is for Olympics, part of its Alphabet series, the company joined the Olympic flame's journey and met with independent bookshops to gather comments on their experiences.

Tanya Fenton, former animator for Disney, is one of its authors (Three Silly Chickens) and illustrators (Three Silly Chickens and Croc on the Rock).
