= Olive, the Other Reindeer =

American 3D computer-animated Christmas film

- DVD cover
- Based on: Olive, the Other Reindeer by: Vivian Walsh; J. Otto Seibold
- Written by: Steve Young
- Directed by: Oscar Moore
- Voices of: Drew Barrymore; Edward Asner; Dan Castellaneta; Joe Pantoliano; Peter MacNicol; Michael Stipe
- Composer: Christopher Tyng
- Country of origin: United States
- Original language: English

Production
- Producers: Keith Alcorn; Matt Groening; Drew Barrymore; Cladia De La Roca; Alex Johns; Nancy Juvonen; Michael Stipe
- Editor: Paul D. Calder
- Running time: 45 minutes (TV version); 46 minutes (unedited version) (Note: 46 minutes on the extended edition on VHS)
- Production companies: DNA Productions; Flower Films; The Curiosity Company; Fox Television Studios; 20th Century Fox Animation

Original release
- Network: Fox
- Release: December 17, 1999

Olive, the Other Reindeer is a 1999 American animated Christmas comedy musical television special written by Steve Young, based on the 1997 children's book by Vivian Walsh and J. Otto Seibold, and directed by Academy Award-nominated animator Steve Moore (credited as "Oscar Moore"). The feature was produced by Matt Groening's The Curiosity Company and animated by DNA Productions. Drew Barrymore voices the title character, and she is credited as an executive producer on the special.

The special first aired on December 17, 1999, alongside Futurama on Fox, exactly ten years after the premiere date of Groening's television series The Simpsons. It was produced by Fox Television Studios and Flower Films. During its initial broadcast, the special brought in 6.06 million viewers, and an additional 5.22 million the following year. After airing again the following year, the special made its first cable television premiere on Nickelodeon on December 15, 2001; It would then premiere the following year on Cartoon Network on December 14, 2002, and aired during each holiday season until it was last seen on December 24, 2012. The special would also air on other local syndicated networks, such as The WB, MyNetworkTV, The CW and WGN-TV.

The story is based on the 1997 children's book by Vivian Walsh and J. Otto Seibold and illustrated by J. Otto Seibold. In the song, "Rudolph the Red-Nosed Reindeer", the lyric "All of the other reindeer" can be misheard in dialects with the cot–caught merger as the mondegreen "Olive, the other reindeer". The special was nominated for the Emmy Award for Outstanding Animated Program.

== Plot ==
The story follows an anthropomorphic dog Jack Russell Terrier named Olive. While in town on Christmas Eve, she meets Martini, a con artist penguin recently fired from the city zoo, from whom she buys a counterfeit Rolex watch. When she returns home she finds her owner, Tim, sad that there "won't be any Christmas" and disappointed that Olive does not behave like a normal dog. While tuning into the radio for comfort music, she hears a news report that Blitzen, one of Santa Claus's reindeer, will not be able to fly this year and that "all of the other reindeer" would need to be able to pick up the slack. Her pet flea convinces Olive that the report actually said "Olive, the other reindeer"; when Tim tries to apologize, the flea mangles the apology such that Olive thinks Tim hates her. Upset, she runs away, hoping to save Christmas and re-earn Tim's favor.

On the way to the bus station, a disgruntled Postman learns of Olive's plan and vows to foil it, stating he wants Christmas ruined because he cannot handle the increased strain on the postal system during the holiday season (it is later revealed that his first time on the naughty list triggered a downward spiral making him more vengeful and even naughtier). After Martini helps Olive narrowly avoid the Postman's attempt to frame Olive for mail fraud and capture her, Olive and Martini catch a bus to the North Pole, with the Postman in hot pursuit.

At a layover in Arctic Junction, Olive and Martini stop in a restaurant, where the Postman is waiting, disguised as a waitress, and kidnaps Olive. Olive escapes by finding a metal file, in a packaged addressed to her from a "Deus Ex Machina". She escapes but misses her connecting bus. At a nearby bar, the local patrons are initially hostile before Olive convinces them to be humble and rekindle their Christmas spirit, which they do. Round John Virgin, the bar owner, takes Olive and Martini personally to the North Pole complex. At the gate, the security guard stubbornly turns Olive and Martini away; Martini devises a complex scheme to convince the guard to turn off the security system and gets Olive in. The Postman follows, delivering a parcel of counterfeit letters full of insults to Santa Claus. The letters nearly convince Santa that he is justified in cancelling the holiday before Olive points out that they lack postmarks and are therefore fakes. Olive takes Blitzen's place but struggles to keep up with the flight.

At the first house, Santa realizes his bag has been switched with junk mail; Olive uses the scent to trace it, leading Santa's sleigh to the Postman's mail truck, where the Postman has also captured Martini. They retrieve the presents and rescue Martini, as Olive fashions cardboard mailers into wings to help her fly. Due to the reduced flight weight tolerance because of the missing reindeer, Martini drives home in the truck, but Olive helps deliver the presents to the world. Just as they reach Olive's home, the sleigh is surrounded by thick fog; Santa uses Olive's scent tracking to lead the sleigh back to the North Pole (since Rudolph is only an urban legend). Santa and the reindeer thank Olive for her help and give her a gift of honorary antler ears before Comet gives her a ride home. Arriving home, Olive makes amends with Tim, who is happy to see her and proud of her bravery. Martini is now a postman, while the former Postman has been outfitted with packing tape and cardboard wings to become the city zoo's new penguin.

== Cast ==
- Drew Barrymore as Olive
- Dan Castellaneta as the Postman
- Joe Pantoliano as Martini, a con artist penguin
- Edward Asner as Santa Claus
- Peter MacNicol as Fido, Olive's pet flea
- Tim Meadows as Richard Stans
- Jay Mohr as Tim, Olive’s owner
- Michael Stipe as Schnitzel, Blitzen's flightless cousin
- Tress MacNeille as Mrs. Claus, the news reporter, and an Inuk woman
- Matt Groening as Arturo, the elf that Schnitzel throws Olive into (uncredited)
- Billy West as an Inuk person
- Diedrich Bader as Zookeeper
- David Herman as Guard Shack Elf
- Mitch Rouse as Round John Virgin and Comet
- Kath Soucie as Rhoda and Ticket Booth Lady

== Music ==
Music by Christopher Tyng, lyrics by Steve Young

- "The Days Still Remaining 'Til Christmas" performed by Drew Barrymore
- "Christmas (Bah, Bug and Hum!)" performed by Dan Castellaneta
- "We're Not So Bad" performed by Michael Stipe of R.E.M.
- "Merry Christmas After All" performed by Big Bad Voodoo Daddy with Drew Barrymore
- "The Days Still Remaining 'Til Christmas (reprise)" performed by Drew Barrymore

== Reception ==
On the review aggregator website Rotten Tomatoes, 60% of 5 critics' reviews are positive, with an average rating of 6.0/10.

== See also ==
- List of Christmas films
- Santa Claus in film
