= Seven Champions of Christendom =

Group of Christian saints

The Seven Champions of Christendom is an epithet referring to St. Andrew, St. Anthony the Lesser, St. David, St. Denis, St. George, St. James Boanerges, and St. Patrick. They are the patron saints of, respectively, Scotland, Portugal, Wales, France, England, Spain, and Ireland.

The champions were depicted in Christian art and folklore in Great Britain as heroic warriors, most notably in a 1596 book by Richard Johnson titled Famous Historie of the Seaven Champions of Christendom. Richard Johnson was entirely responsible for grouping the seven together, for their epithet, and for most of their adventures in his book. Johnson's book was subsequently rewritten in modern English by W. H. G. Kingston.

Legend often portrays God sending James to the Battle of Clavijo to fight against the Moors, while George is usually thought of as being a knightly dragon-slayer. The legend of Patrick casting all of the serpents out of Ireland is also quite famous. While the stories of each of these saints were popular in Europe during the Middle Ages, it was Johnson who was the first to group them together. Four of the Seven Champions—Andrew, George, James, and Denis—died as martyrs. Richard Johnson was the inventor of the ideas that the other three were martyrs, and that any of the Champions besides George and James were knights-errant.

== See also ==
- Four Holy Marshals – another collection of patron saints
- Fourteen Holy Helpers – another collection of patron saints (including SS. Denis and George)
- Nine Worthies – another collection of heroes depicted as knights in the Middle Ages

== Sources ==
- Compton's Encyclopaedia: 21 (S-Sousa).
- Encyclopædia Britannica Concise: Anthony of Padua, Saint
