= Salariya Book Company =

British independent publishing house

- Status: Active
- Founded: 1989; 37 years ago
- Founder: David Salariya
- Country of origin: United Kingdom
- Headquarters location: Brighton
- Distribution: Orca Book Services (UK); Sterling Publishing (US)
- Publication types: Books
- Nonfiction topics: Children's non-fiction, fiction and baby books
- Imprints: Book House, Scribblers and Scribo
- Official website: salariya.com

The Salariya Book Company is an independent publishing house founded in 1989 and based in Brighton, United Kingdom, which publishes children’s non-fiction, fiction and baby books both domestically and internationally. Salariya books are published in the UK through its Book House, Scribblers and Scribo imprints.

== History ==
The Salariya Book Company was founded by David Salariya as a book-packaging company in 1989 in Brighton, England. In 2002, the company started publishing under its imprint Book House, going on to launch the imprint Scribblers (designed to develop key learning skills for babies and pre-school children) in 2007 and the children’s fiction imprint Scribo in 2009.

== Founder ==
David Salariya was born in Dundee, Scotland in 1954. He attended Ancrum Road Primary School then Harris Academy, before studying illustration and printmaking at Duncan of Jordanstone College of Art and Design, Dundee, specialising in book design in his postgraduate year. He worked as a freelance illustrator and designer before founding The Salariya Book Company in 1989. He lives in Brighton with his wife Shirley and their son Jonathan.

== Books ==
Book series publishing by The Salariya Book Company include You Wouldn’t Want To Be (published as The Danger Zone in the UK), a series of more than 50 illustrated historical non-fiction titles told using a first-person narrative, and Graffex, classic novels adapted into the graphic novel format. In 2009, the company bought the rights to the popular French-Canadian fantasy fiction series Amos Daragon, an animation of which is being developed by Spectra Animation in Canada.

== Awards ==
In 2009, The Salariya Book Company was one of three publishers shortlisted for the Independent Publishers Guild's Children’s Publisher of the Year award. In 2010, the Company went one better, beating Walker Books and Top That! to win the Children's Publisher of the Year award.

=== Graffex ===
Graffex is a series of books published in the UK by Book House and available in numerous languages worldwide. The series takes famous literary classics and retells them in a graphic novel format. Each title is an abridged version of the original book, and is designed to engage young readers through the use of simplified narratives and colourful visual aids.

Most of the titles are illustrated by Penko Gelev, although Li Sidong, Nick Spender and Romano Felmang have also contributed to the series. Titles in the series include:

- The Adventures of Huckleberry Finn by Mark Twain (retold by Tom Ratliff)
- Dracula by Bram Stoker (retold by Fiona Macdonald)
- Dr. Jekyll and Mr. Hyde by Robert Louis Stevenson (retold by Fiona Macdonald)
- Frankenstein by Mary Shelley (retold by Fiona Macdonald)
- The Hunchback of Notre Dame by Victor Hugo (retold by Michael Ford)
- A Journey to the Center of the Earth by Jules Verne (retold by Fiona Macdonald)
- Kidnapped by Robert Louis Stevenson (retold by Fiona Macdonald)
- Macbeth by William Shakespeare (retold by Stephen Haynes)
- The Man in the Iron Mask by Alexandre Dumas, père (retold by Jim Pipe)
- Moby Dick by Herman Melville (retold by Sophie Furse)
- Oliver Twist Charles Dickens (retold by John Malam)
- A Tale of Two Cities by Charles Dickens (retold by Fiona Macdonald)
- Treasure Island by Robert Louis Stevenson (retold by Fiona Macdonald)
- Hamlet by William Shakespeare (retold by Kathy McEvoy)
- Julius Caesar by William Shakespeare (retold by Michael Ford)
- Wuthering Heights by Emily Brontë (retold by Jim Pipe)
- Jane Eyre by Charlotte Brontë (retold by Fiona MacDonald)
- The Three Musketeers by Alexandre Dumas, père (retold by Jim Pipe)
- The Odyssey by Homer (retold by Fiona MacDonald)
- Romeo and Juliet by William Shakespeare (retold by Jim Pipe)
- Twenty Thousand Leagues Under the Seas by Jules Verne (retold by Jacqueline Morley)
- Gulliver's Travels by Jonathan Swift (retold by John Malam)

=== A Very Peculiar History ===
A Very Peculiar History is a series of illustrated non-fiction books published in the United Kingdom by Salariya under the "Book House" name. The series is intended to interest adults and young people in history by compressing many facts and curiosities into 192 pages. The books are designed with multiple entry points (fact boxes, lists, recipes, etc.) so they can be "dipped into". The emphasis is on highlighting little-known and bizarre stories and facts, while covering the known history of the subject and debunking popular urban myths.

The books are written by different authors, including Fiona Macdonald, Jim Pipe, David Arscott, Ian Graham and Jacqueline Morley.

Titles in the series include:

- Ancient Egypt: A Very Peculiar History – The Art of Embalming: Mummy, Myth and Magic
- Scotland: A Very Peculiar History (2 volumes)
- London: A Very Peculiar History
- Castles: A Very Peculiar History
- Golf: A Very Peculiar History
- Great Britons: A Very Peculiar History
- The Olympics: A Very Peculiar History
- Kings & Queens: A Very Peculiar History
- Christmas: A Very Peculiar History
- Titanic: A Very Peculiar History
- Royal Weddings: A Very Peculiar History
- Global Warming: A Very Peculiar History
- The Tudors: A Very Peculiar History
- William Shakespeare: A Very Peculiar History
- Charles Dickens: A Very Peculiar History
- World War One: A Very Peculiar History
- Whisky: A Very Peculiar History
- Brighton: A Very Peculiar History
- Wales: A Very Peculiar History
- Ireland: A Very Peculiar History
- The Blitz: A Very Peculiar History
- Rations: A Very Peculiar History
- Vampires: A Very Peculiar History
- Victorian Servants: A Very Peculiar History
- Yorkshire: A Very Peculiar History
- The World Cup: A Very Peculiar History
- Cats: A Very Peculiar History
- Dogs: A Very Peculiar History
- England: A Very Peculiar History (3 volumes)
- Edinburgh: A Very Peculiar History
- Oxford: A Very Peculiar History

2013 saw the release of ebook editions of the "A Very Peculiar History" series.

== See also ==
- UK children's book publishers
- Amos Daragon
- Scribblers
