= Cuento de Luz =

- Founded: 2007
- Founder: Ana Eulate
- Country of origin: Spain
- Headquarters location: Madrid
- Key people: Ana Eulate, Owner and Editor
- Publication types: Multiple distributors (Spain and Latin America); Ingram Publisher Services (US)
- Fiction genres: Children's literature, Picture books
- Revenue: ▲US $0.5 million (2010)
- No. of employees: 2
- Official website: www.cuentodeluz.com

Cuento de Luz is an independent publisher specializing in illustrated children books. Founded in 2007 by Ana Eulate in her garage, the company published its first title in April 2010. Cuento de Luz publishes their books in both English and Spanish.
