= Barefoot Books =

American multi-level marketing company

- Logo for Barefoot Books
- Status: Active
- Founded: 9 September 1992; 33 years ago in England
- Founder: Nancy Traversy and Tessa Strickland
- Country of origin: United Kingdom
- Headquarters location: Concord, Massachusetts
- Distribution: self-distributed (North America); Littlehampton Book Services (Europe); Peribo (Australia)
- Fiction genres: Children's literature
- Official website: www.barefootbooks.com

Barefoot Books is an independent children's book publisher, which was founded in England on September 9, 1992. The company is now based in Concord, Massachusetts, United States as of 2021.

== History ==
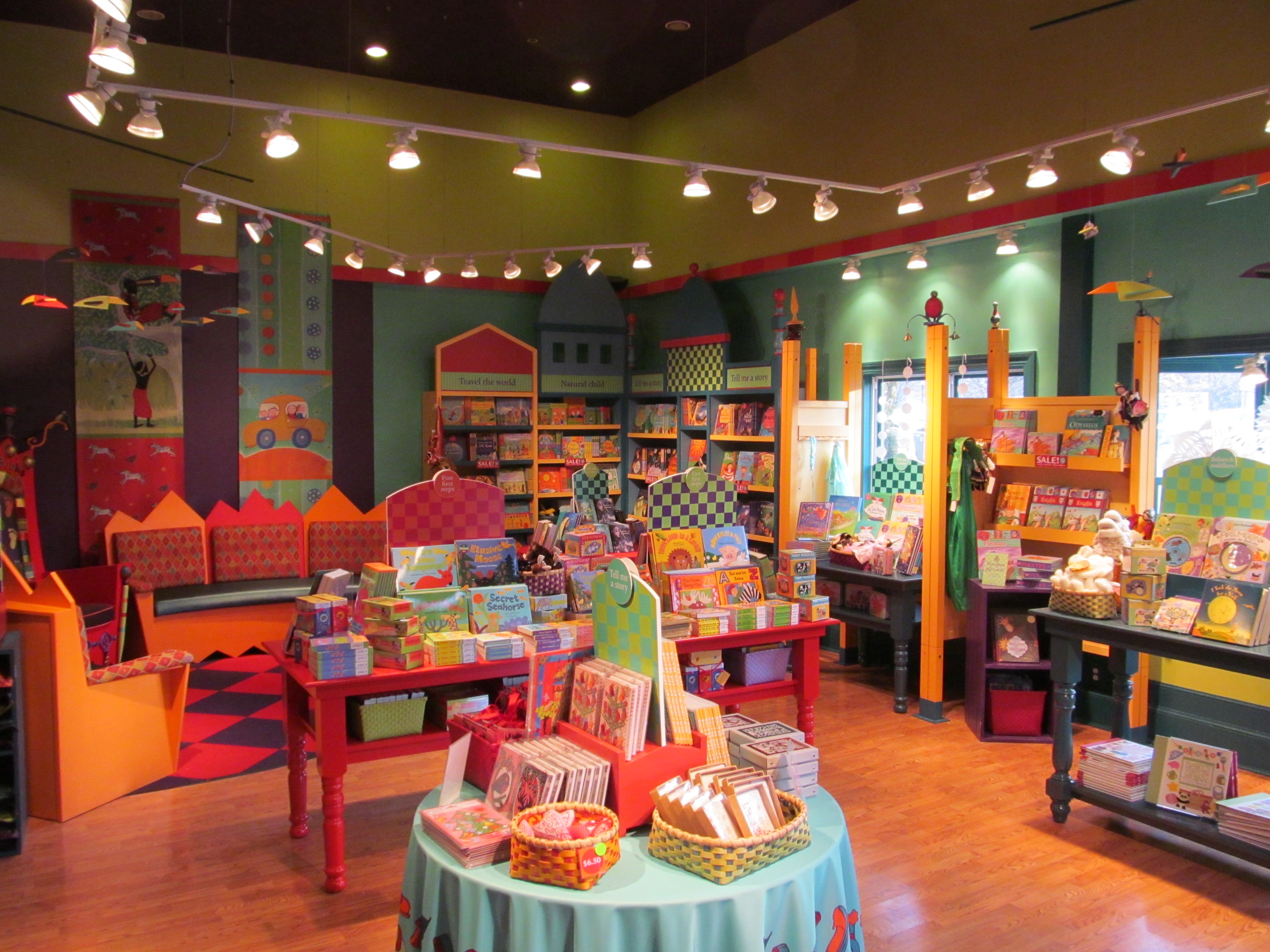
Barefoot Books Studio in Concord, Massachusetts

The company began as a home business in 1992 and was founded in England by Nancy Traversy and Tessa Strickland. Barefoot Books are sold via several outlets, including through the company's "Barefoot Books Community Book Seller" program. Book Sellers are individuals who sell Barefoot Books products through home parties, community, and school events.

By 2006, Barefoot Books had released more than 400 books. In March 2012, the company released The Barefoot World Atlas app. In 2017, they were named by Forbes as one of the 25 Best Small Companies in America.

Barefoot was the first children's book publisher on Faire, the B2B online marketplace that launched in 2017.

In 2018, Barefoot partnered with Little Passports and Kiwi which made it the first children's publisher to participate in subscription boxes. With the subscription boxes, sales grew over 350% before 2020.
