= Robert Nicholls (artist) =

British paleoartist

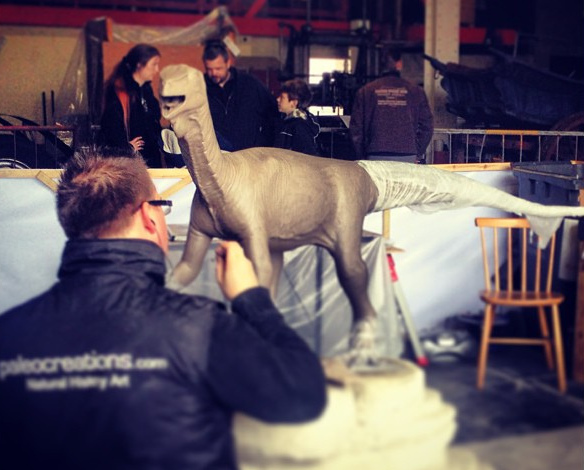
- Born: 5 August 1975 (age 50); Gloucestershire, England
- Occupation: Paleoartist
- Awards: Marsh Palaeoart Award, by Palaeontographical Society (2024, inaugural winner)
- Website: paleocreations.com

Robert (Bob) Nicholls is a British paleoartist.

== Biography ==
Nicholls grew up in Gloucestershire, England, and now lives in Bristol with his wife and daughters. Bob began drawing prehistoric animals before he was old enough to attend school and at a very young age decided to pursue a career in paleoart. His passion for wildlife, paleontology and art inspired him throughout university at which he gained a Bachelor of Arts (Hons) in Visual Communication at the University of Central England in 1997 (Thesis title: Image of a Dinosaur). He stayed on at UCE to gain a Post Graduate Diploma in Visual Communication in 1997 followed by a Master of Arts in the same subject in 1999 (Thesis title: Dinosaurs from the Inside Out).

== Paleocreations ==
In 1999 Nicholls founded his own company Paleocreations, currently based in Bristol in the UK. Paleocreations specialises in creating anatomically accurate 2D and 3D reconstructions of prehistoric animals, plants, and environments. Animals are reconstructed from the inside out, from skeletal structures, soft part anatomy, and external skin, fur and feathers, for both temporary and permanent display. Bob's works are currently displayed in nearly 50 museums, institutions and aquariums across Europe, Asia, Australia, and North America, including the London Natural History Museum, GeoCenter Møns Klint, National Museum Wales, University of Cambridge, Hunterian Museum and Art Gallery and MuSe, Museo delle Scienze, in Trento, Italy. He has been commissioned to create artwork for over 40 books on natural history. He has also produced work for several broadcasting companies including the BBC, Icon Films, and National Geographic. As an active member of the palaeontological world Bob is often interviewed and written about online. He has also contributed to a number of scientific papers.

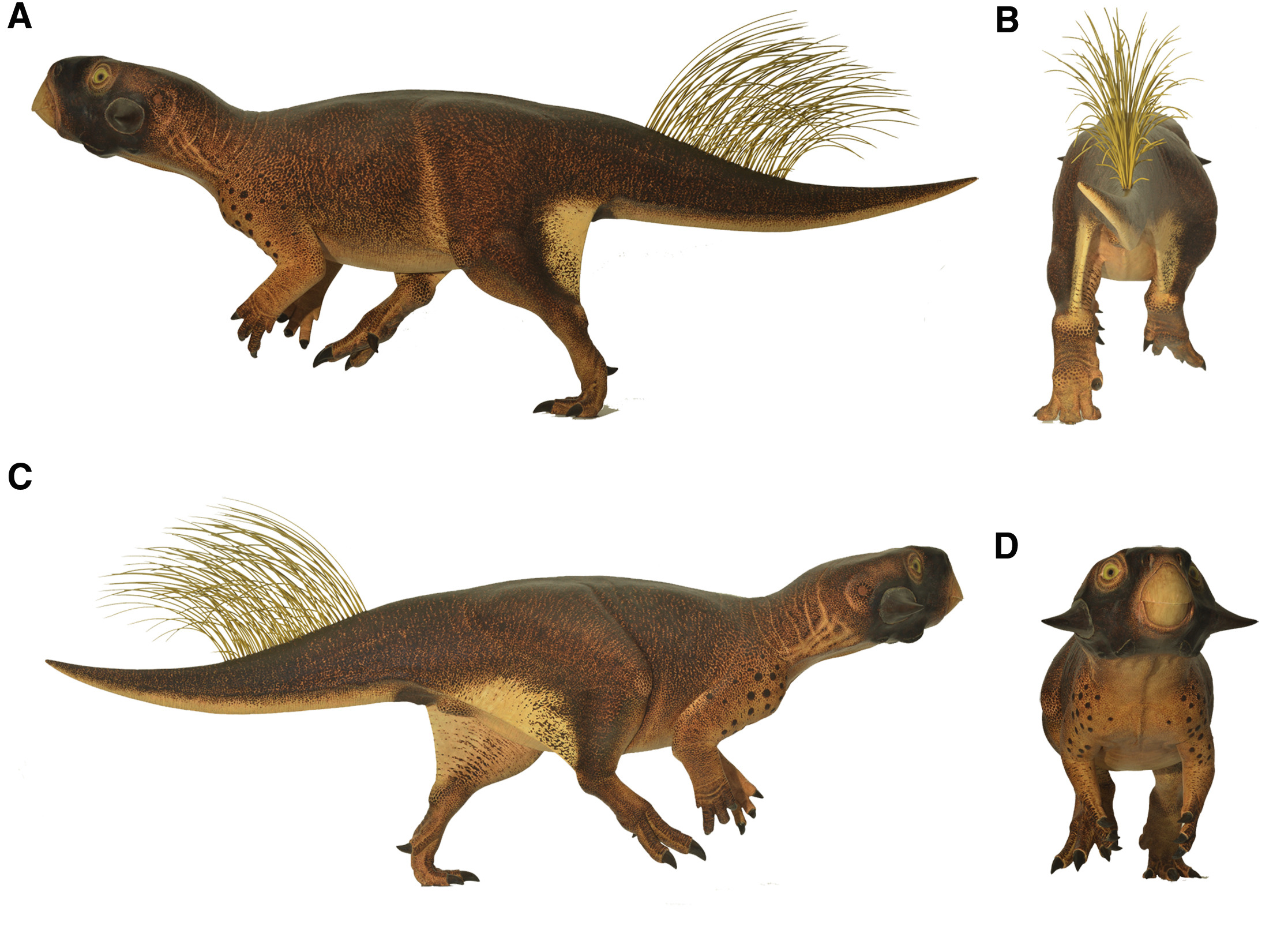
Psittacosaurus model by paleoartist Robert Nicholls, based on the fossil specimens SMF R 4970. Left lateral view (A), posterior view (B), right lateral view (C), and anterior view (D).

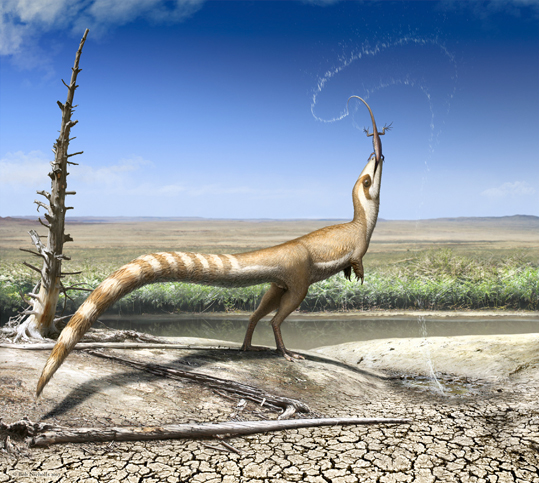
Restoration of Sinosauropteryx preying on Dalinghosaurus, by Bob Nicholls

His artwork has been used by the Royal Mint for coins: in 2021, celebrating Mary Anning; in 2023 with 3 dinosaurs, one each for the Triassic, Jurassic and Cretaceous Periods; and in 2025 with 3 Ice Age mammals (Steppe Mammoth, Giant Deer, and Woolly Rhinoceros).

== Bibliography ==
=== Books ===
Bob's artwork has been featured within the following books:

- Dinosaur Art: the World's Greatest Paleoart by Steve White (Titan Books, 2012)
- The Complete Dinosaur by James Farlow (Indiana University Press, 2012)
- Evolution: the Human Story by Professor Alice Roberts (Dorling Kindersley, 2011)
- Spot 50 Dinosaurs by Steve Parker (Miles Kelly Publishing, 2011)
- Elephants' Call by Gordon Volke (Quest; an imprint of Top That! Publishing, 2010)
- Wolves' Gambit by Gordon Volke (Quest; an imprint of Top That! Publishing, 2010)
- The Tigers' Secret by Gordon Volke (Quest; an imprint of Top That! Publishing, 2010)
- The Orcas' Song by Gordon Volke (Quest; an imprint of Top That! Publishing, 2010)
- Condors' Quest by Gordon Volke (Quest; an imprint of Top That! Publishing, 2010)
- Penguins' Petition by Gordon Volke (Quest; an imprint of Top That! Publishing, 2010)
- Dolphins Cry by Gordon Volke (Quest; an imprint of Top That! Publishing, 2010)
- Dinosaurs by Dougal Dixon (Quarto Children's Books, 2009)
- Britain's Oldest Art: the Ice Age Cave Art of Creswell Crags by Paul Bahn and Paul Pettitt (English Heritage, 2009)
- Dinosaur by Stephanie Stansbie, (Roar Publishing, 2008) (Translated into 7 different languages)
- A Time Traveller's Field Notes and Observations of Dinosaurs by Gordon Volke (Quest; an imprint of Top That! Publishing, 2008)
- A Time Traveller's Field Notes and Observations of Ancient Egypt by Gordon Volke (Quest; an imprint of Top That! Publishing, 2008)
- Dinosaur Hunter, edited by Sarah Gale (Hachette Partworks Ltd, 2008)
- History in the Landscape by Alistair Bowden (The Weardale Society, 2008)
- Dinosaur Hunters by Jen Green (Quarto Children's Books, 2007)
- The World Encyclopedia of Dinosaurs and Prehistoric Creatures by Dougal Dixon (Lorenz Books, an Imprint of Anness Publishing Ltd, 2007)
- Aligerando a los gigantes by Dr Mathew Wedel (Paleonturologia, 2007)
- Sheffield's Golden Frame by Bill Bevan (Sigma Press, 2007)
- The Book of Prehistoric Pop-up Board Games by Robert Nicholls (Tango Books, 2006)
- Dinosaur Detectives Handbook by Belinda Gallagher (Miles Kelly Publishing, 2006)
- Planet Dinosaur by Steve Parker (Miles Kelly Publishing, 2005)
- English Adventure Book 5 (Pearson, 2004)
- Fossil Frogs and Toads of North America by Alan Holman (Indiana University Press, 2003)
- Leedsichthys by Peter Eberhardt (Illustreret Videnskab, 2003)
- The Great Dune Trilogy by Frank Herbert (Gollancz, an imprint of Orion Publishing, 2003)
- Children of Dune by Frank Herbert (Gollancz, an imprint of Orion Publishing, 2003)
- God Emperor of Dune by Frank Herbert (Gollancz, an imprint of Orion Publishing, 2003)
- Heretics of Dune by Frank Herbert (Gollancz, an imprint of Orion Publishing, 2003)
- Chapter House of Dune by Frank Herbert (Gollancz, an imprint of Orion Publishing, 2003)
- Paleoimagery: the Evolution of Dinosaur Art by Allen Debus (McFarland & Company, 2002)
- The Lost World by Grant Warrenger (Wildlife Art Publishing, 2002)
- The Dinosaur Coast by Roger Osborne (York Moors Press, 2001)
- Dinosaurs in the Sea by Dougal Dixon (Ticktock Publishing Ltd, 2001)

=== Articles ===
- Fiann M Smithwick; Robert Nicholls; Innes C Cuthill; Jakob Vinther (23 October 2017). "Countershading and Stripes in the Theropod Dinosaur Sinosauropteryx Reveal Heterogeneous Habitats in the Early Cretaceous Jehol Biota". Current Biology. 27 (21): 3337-3343.e2. doi:10.1016/J.CUB.2017.09.032. ISSN 0960-9822. PMID 29107548. Wikidata Q46267925.
