= Miles Kelly Publishing =

Children's publishing company

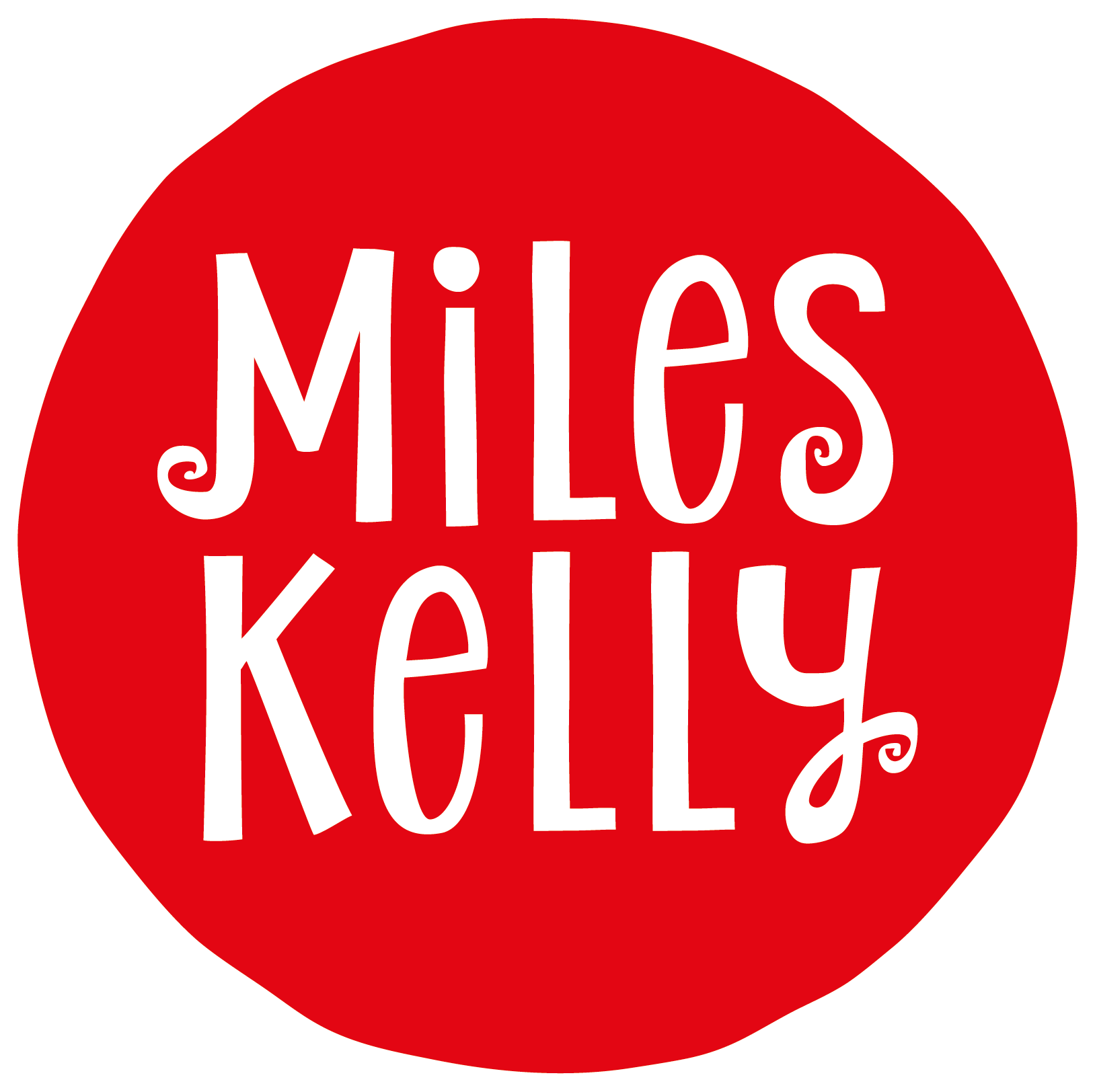
- Status: Active
- Founded: 1996
- Founder: Jim Miles and Gerard Kelly
- Country of origin: United Kingdom
- Headquarters location: Bardfield End Green, Essex
- Distribution: Trade Counter Distribution (UK); John Reed Books (Australia); South Pacific Books (New Zealand)
- Publication types: Books
- Nonfiction topics: Children's reference
- Official website: www.mileskelly.net

Miles Kelly Publishing is an independent children's publishing company founded by Jim Miles and Gerard Kelly in 1996. It is based in the village of Bardfield End Green near Thaxted in Essex, UK, after moving from its base of 13 years in Great Bardfield in 2010. Its books are available throughout the world in over 50 languages. Miles Kelly's publishing list is aimed at children between the ages of 3 and 12 years.

Miles Kelly's backlist consists of over 700 titles – encyclopedias, reference series, quiz books, dictionaries, atlases, handbooks, fact books, poetry, fiction and novelty books.

Since 1996 Miles Kelly has on occasion produced books for other publishers. In total it has created over 200 titles for 15 different publishing companies in the UK and US. Miles Kelly produced six of the Ripley's Believe It or Not! titles.

Alongside its traditional publishing output, Miles Kelly used to run Budding Press, an imprint specialising in the production of high-end children's fiction for self-publishers, but this project has since ceased.

== See also ==
- UK children's book publishers
