= John Webb's Mill, Thaxted =

Historic building in Essex, United Kingdom

John Webb's Mill
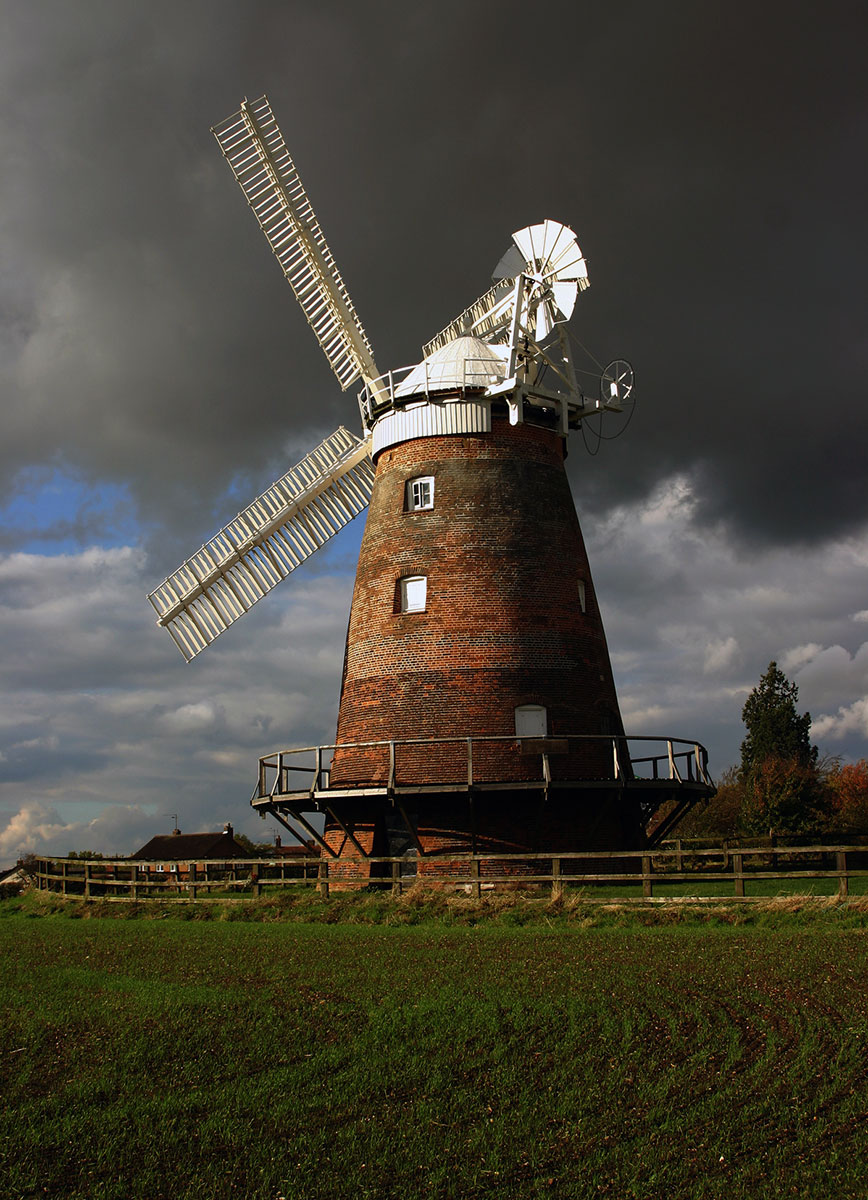
- The restored mill, October 2004
- Interactive map of John Webb's Mill

Origin
- Mill name: John Webb's Mill; Lowe's Mill
- Grid reference: TL 609 308
- Coordinates: 51.9525°N 0.3410°E
- Operator: The Thaxted Society
- Year built: 1804

Information
- Purpose: Corn mill
- Type: Tower mill
- Storeys: Five storeys
- No. of sails: Four sails
- Type of sails: Patent sails
- Windshaft: Cast iron
- Winding: Fantail
- Fantail blades: Eight blades
- No. of pairs of millstones: Three pairs
- Size of millstones: 5 feet (1.52 m), 4 feet 6 inches (1.37 m) and 4 feet 3 inches (1.30 m)

John Webb’s or Lowe’s Mill is a Grade II* listed tower mill at Thaxted, Essex, England, which had been restored to working order, but is currently out of action following the loss of a sail in April 2010.

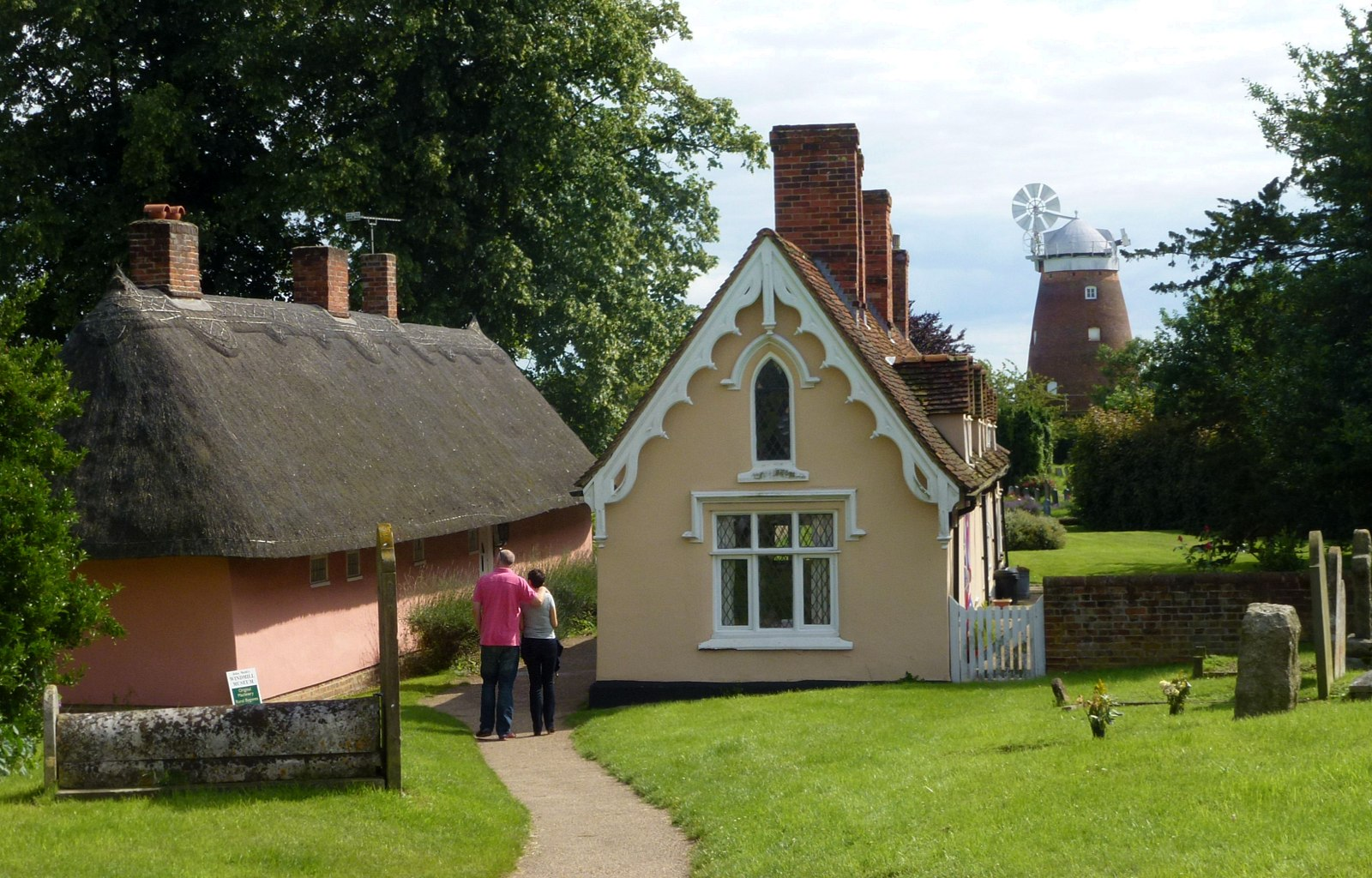
Almshouses at the parish church of St John, with the sailless John Webb's Windmill in the background, in July 2012.

== History ==
The windmill was built by millwrights James Hunt of Banham, Norfolk and his son Reuben Hunt in 1804 for John Webb, a local farmer and landowner, to satisfy the increasing demand for flour both locally and in London. It was constructed using local materials, with timber from two local farms and bricks made at a nearby location in the Chelmer Valley also owned by John Webb.

The mill was always worked by millers named Lowe or John Webb, thus gaining its names. The mill was last worked commercially in 1910. The mill was disused for over twenty years until the Thaxted Civic Trust carried out essential repairs and made the structure waterproof. The lower floors were used as a scout hut. The mill passed into the ownership of Thaxted Parish Council in the 1950s. The Thaxted Society, formed in 1964, has been instrumental in the restoration of the mill to full working order.

In 2004, the cap and sails were removed to enable repairs to the brickwork at the top of the tower. The repairs were completed by the end of the year. The mill was officially reopened on 8 April 2005 by Lord Petre. On 5 April 2010, the stock of one pair of sails broke, and the sail crashed to the ground, damaging the stage as it fell. There were no injuries among the six or seven visitors in the mill at the time. On the ground and first floors there is a rural museum containing agricultural artifacts.

== Description ==
John Webb’s Mill is a five-storey tower mill with a domed cap with a gallery. The cap is winded by an eight blade fantail. There is a stage at first floor level. The tower is 24 feet (7.32 m) diameter at base level and 15 feet (4.57 m) diameter at curb level. The tower is 48 feet 6 inches (14.78 m) high, having been raised by some 4 feet (1.22 m) at some time. The mill is 54 feet (16.46 m) high to the top of the cap. The brickwork is 4 feet (1.22 m) thick at ground level and 18 inches (460 mm) thick at curb level.

The cast-iron windshaft carries a clasp arm brake wheel with 88 cogs. It drives a wooden wallower with 50 cogs carried on a cast iron upright shaft. The 8-foot-10-inch (2.69 m) clasp arm great spur wheel has 122 cogs and drives three stone nuts – two with 19 cogs and the third with 20 cogs. The millstones are 5 feet (1.52 m), 4 feet 6 inches (1.37 m) and 4 feet 3 inches (1.30 m) diameter.

As built, John Webb’s Mill had a wooden windshaft some 18 inches (460 mm) longer than the present one, carrying four Common sails. It drove two pairs of millstones, the third pair being added at a later date. In 1890, the mill was carrying four double Patent sails and by the early 1900s was working on two double Patent sails and two single Patent sails.

== Millers ==
Millers working at John Webb's Mill include:

- John Webb 1823
- Lowe 1837
- John Webb 1848–1853
- Harry Lowe 1907–1910

== Cultural relevance ==
The windmill briefly reached an international audience when it was used in a scene in Passolini's 1972 adaptation of The Canterbury Tales. The mill, in its dilapidated state prior to restoration, provides a backdrop to the conversation between the Summoner, the Devil and the Old Woman in The Friar's Tale.
