= Wihtgar Ælfricsson =

Wihtgar Ælfricsson (fl. 1042–71) was an Anglo-Saxon thegn who lived in East Anglia in the mid-eleventh century at the time of the Norman Conquest. He was the son of Ælfric Modercope, an Anglo-Norse thegn connected with the last Danish and Anglo-Saxon courts of England.

Wihtgar held extensive lands across East Anglia in 1066. He is mentioned in the Domesday Book as being lord of 38 locations in south Suffolk and north Essex and overlord of 76 more. He lost these lands sometime between 1071 and 1075 when William the Conqueror awarded them to Richard Fitz Gilbert (fl. 1035–90).

The estates of Wihtgar Ælfricsson were valued at £284 in 1066, and were concentrated comprised the four great demesne manors of Clare, Hundon and Desning, in the hundred of Risbridge in south-west Suffolk, and Thaxted in Dunmow Hundred in the adjoining area of north-west Essex. These four manors, valued at £165 in 1066, made up the core of the Anglo-Norman honor of Clare under Richard Fitz Gilbert.

Wihtgar's father established a collegiate church at Clare with seven prebends under the rule of a priest named Leodmer. The church was placed under the lordship of Wihtgar, with Abbot Leofstan of Bury St Edmunds assuming spiritual responsibility. Wihtgar may have occupied a tower within the abbey at Bury St Edmunds.
