= Richmond's Green =

Hamlet in Essex, England

Coordinates: 51.936°N 0.361°E

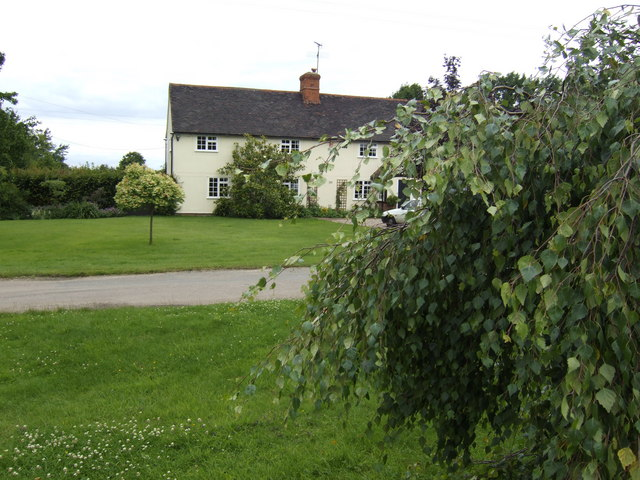
- Houses at Richmond's Green

- Location within Essex
- Civil parish: Thaxted
- District: Uttlesford
- Shire county: Essex
- Region: East
- Country: England
- Sovereign state: United Kingdom
- Police: Essex
- Fire: Essex
- Ambulance: East of England

Richmond's Green or Richmonds Green is a hamlet in the civil parish of Thaxted, and the Uttlesford district of Essex, England. It is 1.5 miles (2 km) miles south-east from the town of Thaxted. The post town for Richmond's Green is Dunmow.
