= Thaxted Guildhall =

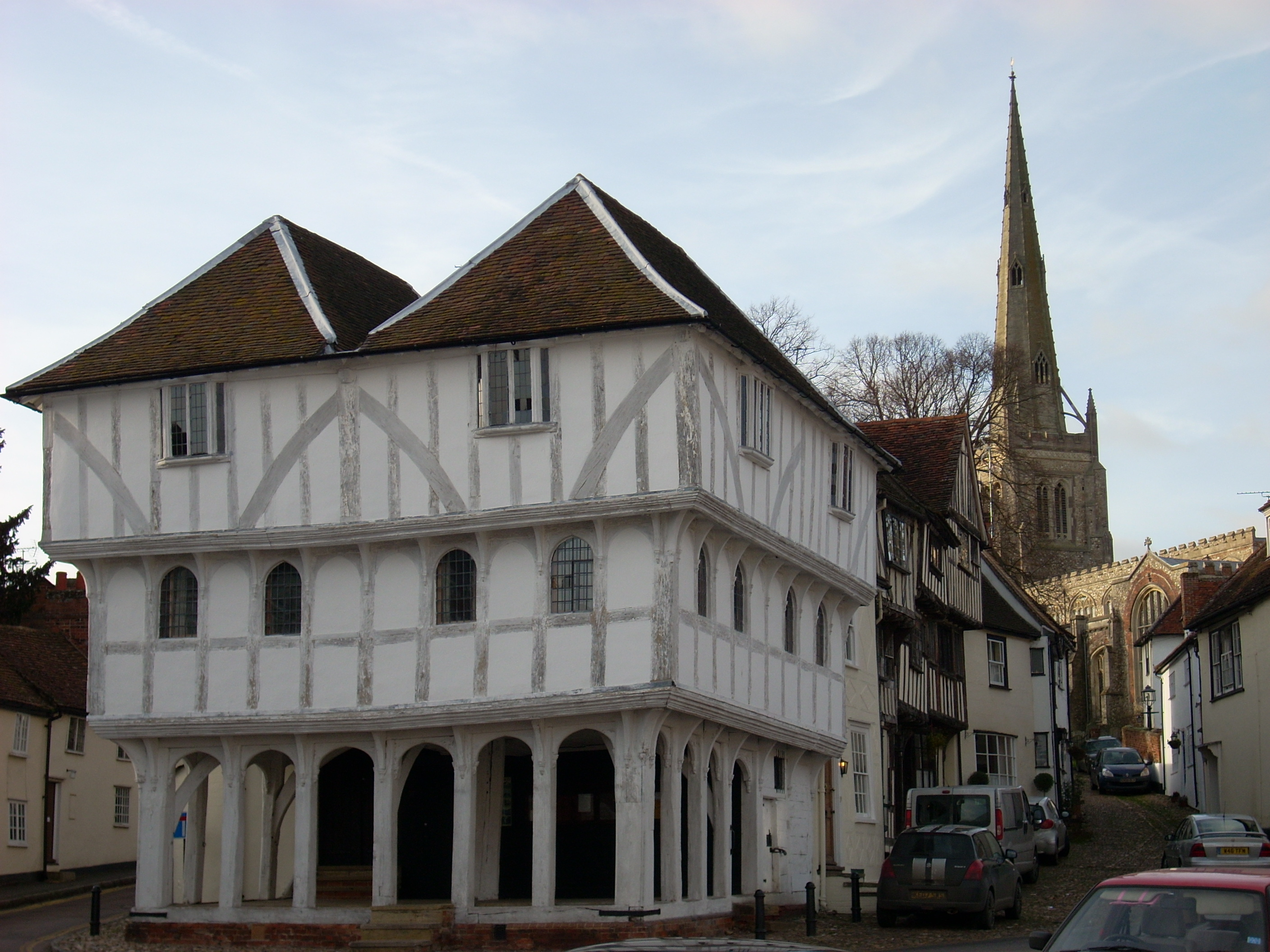
- Thaxted Guildhall in 2008

- Location within Essex
- 51.9538°N 0.3441°E
- Location: Thaxted, Essex

History
- Built: 1410

Site notes
- Architectural style: Jettied timber framing

Listed Building – Grade I
- Official name: Guildhall, Thaxted
- Designated: 20 February 1967
- Reference no.: 1112905

Thaxted Guildhall is a municipal building in Thaxted, Essex, England. It is a Grade I listed building.

== History ==
By the late 14th century, Thaxted was at the centre of the local cutlery trade. It is thought that the Guild of Cutlers contributed to the cost of the building, which the listed building details prepared in 1967 suggests, was completed between 1390 and 1410. However, dendrochronology indicates that much of the timber used in the building actually dates to the late 15th century.

The design made extensive use of jettied timber framing: on the ground floor the building was arcaded to allow markets to be held; the first floor, which jutted out over the pavement on three sides, featured four small gothic windows on each side and the attic floor, which jutted out further, featured two small bay windows on each side. A large oak post was erected in the centre of the market area on the ground floor area to support the structure above. Internally the principal room was the meeting hall on the first floor at the front of the building; at the back of the building was a staircase on the left and a sealed off area known as the "old cage" on the right. The cage was probably used as a village lock-up as evidenced by its original doorway on the ground floor and the barred window grates on the first floor.

The guildhall was used as meeting place for the town which flourished after receiving a charter from Queen Mary I in the mid-16th century but then declined after the charter was rescinded when King James II fell from power in the late 17th century. The building was restored at that time and converted into a school, remaining in that use, as Thaxted Grammar School, until 1878. Further refurbishment work, including timber restoration, was carried out in 1911 and again, as part of European Architectural Heritage Year, in 1975.

In 2008 the guildhall was used for a Design Statement Exhibition, which sought local opinions to guide local development. Works of art in the guildhall include a portrait of the prominent British Christian socialist and local priest, the Reverend Conrad Noel, by Frank William Carter. (Note: Frank William Carter was the son of the better-known painter, Hugh Carter.) There is also a small museum in the building exhibiting photographs and objects associated with the town and its development over time.
