= Monk Street =

Hamlet in Essex, England

Coordinates: 51.934°N 0.344°E

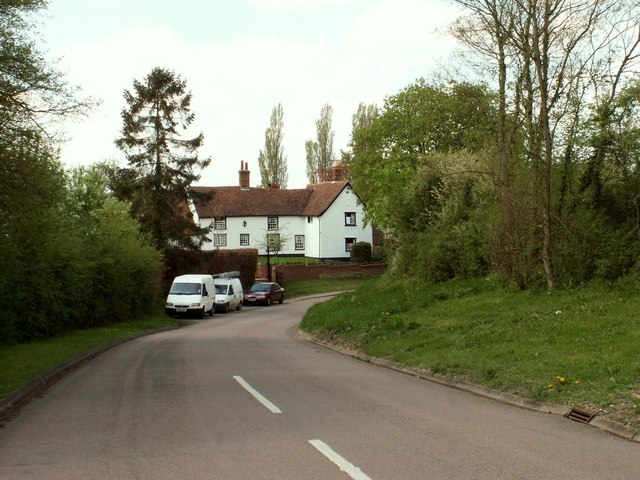
- Monk Street Farm, at the entrance to the hamlet

- Location within Essex
- Civil parish: Thaxted
- District: Uttlesford
- Shire county: Essex
- Region: East
- Country: England
- Sovereign state: United Kingdom

Monk Street is a hamlet in the civil parish of Thaxted, in the Uttlesford district of Essex, England. It is 1.5 miles (2.4 km) south of the town of Thaxted, on the main B184 road to Great Dunmow. The name of the hamlet is probably linked to the former Cistercian abbey in nearby Tilty.

The composer Gustav Holst rented a thatched cottage in Monk Street from his friend Samuel Bensusan in 1915. It was whilst staying in this cottage that Holst worked on The Planets suite. In 1917 Holst moved to a house in Town Street, Thaxted. The cottage, which dated from 1614, burnt down in the early 1940s.

The main A130 trunk road once passed through the centre of the hamlet, but it was bypassed by a road straightening and widening scheme in the 1960s.
