= Bardfield End Green =

Hamlet in Essex, England

Coordinates: 51.952°N 0.364°E

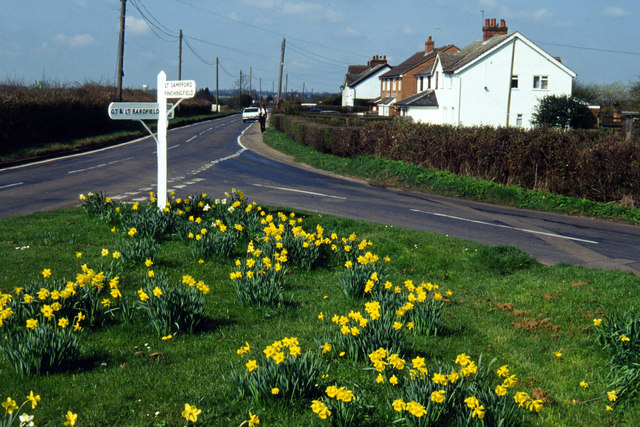

- Location within Essex
- OS grid reference: TL6230
- District: Uttlesford
- Shire county: Essex
- Region: East
- Country: England
- Sovereign state: United Kingdom
- Police: Essex
- Fire: Essex
- Ambulance: East of England

Bardfield End Green is a hamlet in the Uttlesford district of Essex, England, located approximately one mile east of Thaxted. It is the home of Thaxted cricket club.
