= Ælfric Modercope =

Ælfric Modercope (Old English: Ælfrīc Mōdercoppe; Old Norse: *Alfrīkr Mōðirkoppr), sometimes known as Alfric de Modercope in modern English and as Ælfric Wihtgarsson in the patronymic system, was an Anglo-Norse thegn from East Anglia.

While Ælfric is an Old English name, his nickname Modercope or Modercoppe is Norse. This would exemplify the time when there were strong Anglo-Danish links, and three successive Danish kings had held the throne until Edward the Confessor succeeded in 1042. Ælfric had a strong connection at court, but his role and status are unusual: he was described as a comes famoses in a document from Bury St Edmunds.

Ælfric was the son of Wihtgar and his son was also called Wihtgar.

Ælfric was one of the wealthiest of the East Anglian thegns during this period, whose estate can be traced through the lands held by his son, Wihtgar, that were recorded in the Domesday Book of 1086. His wealth and reputation derived from his connections with Emma of Normandy (d. 1052), wife of King Cnut and prior to that, second wife of Æthelred the Unready (d. 1016). As her dapifer (steward or seneschal), Ælfric administered the eight-and-a-half hundreds of west Suffolk on her behalf. He also appears to have had family connections in the queen's household, as evidenced by a bequest left to him as 'kinsman' in a will addressed directly to the queen.

Ælfric's will is in the archives of Bury St Edmunds. In it he leaves certain lands to religious institutions in Ely and Bury St Edmunds, including in Loddon, a small town in South Norfolk. He is therefore credited as the first person to record the name of Loddon or 'Lodne' in any document, and consequently his figure appears on the town's sign.
