= Kane/Miller =

Children's book publisher

- Parent company: Educational Development Corporation
- Founded: 1984
- Founder: Madeline Kane and Sandy Miller
- Country of origin: United States
- Headquarters location: San Diego, California
- Publication types: Children's Books
- Nonfiction topics: baby books, board books, picture books, chapter books, middle grade, nonfiction, series fiction
- Official website: www.kanemiller.com

Kane/Miller Book Publishers, Inc., now Kane Miller, A Division of EDC Publishing, is a San Diego-based publisher specializing in children's books from around the world. The company was acquired by the Educational Development Corporation in 2008.

== History ==
Kane Miller was started as Kane/Miller Book Publishers in 1984 by siblings Madeline Kane and Sandy Miller as a small family business, specializing in publishing children’s books from around the world for the US audience. Miller had previously been involved with importing movies from outside the United States of America, and when he had his first child, he realized the cultural benefits of also bringing in books. The publisher found success in 1993 with Tarō Gomi's Everyone Poops, a Japanese language import that sold over one million copies and is now their best-known title. By 2000, the company closed its Brooklyn, New York offices to be based solely in San Diego, California. Both Kane and Miller retired by 2001. Kira Lynn was named the new head of the company shortly thereafter. The company was acquired by Educational Development Corporation of Tulsa, Oklahoma, in 2008.

Today, Kane Miller, A Division of EDC Publishing, publishes an assortment of baby books, board books, picture books, chapter books, middle grade, nonfiction, games, and toys for children.

== Acquisition ==
By December 11, 2008 Kane Miller had been acquired by the Educational Development Corporation (EDC), the sole US trade publisher of the United Kingdom-based Usborne Books. According to Randall White, board chairman, CEO, and President of EDC, the integration of the two companies went smoothly. The move was well received within the publishing industry, and EDC expressed hope that it would increase sales.

== Products ==
The majority of Kane Miller's titles originate from publishers outside the US. One of the publisher's greatest commercial success was Everyone Poops by Taro Gomi, followed by Wilfrid Gordon McDonald Partridge by Australian author Mem Fox which began its publishing run in 1985, and as of 2005 was nearing one million copies sold. Another top-seller was 2004's Guji Guji by Taiwanese author Chih-Yuan Chen, which sold 65,000 copies between 2004 and 2005. The company became the US distributor of the Anna Hibiscus series by UK-based Nigerian author Atinuke in 2010. Other Kane Miller top sellers include All Better! and Good as New by Henning Löhlein and Bernd Penners, the Shine-a-Light series, and Emma Yarlett's Nibbles series.

== Sales ==
Kane Miller's books are available through the two sales channels of their parent company, Educational Development Corporation. PaperPie, formerly known as Usborne Books & More, is the home business division of Educational Development Corporation. PaperPie Brand Partners sell directly to customers (including schools, libraries, and individuals). Kane Miller's books are available to trade through Educational Development Corporation's retail division, EDC Publishing. EDC's trade division markets books and educational products to bookstores (including major national chains), toy stores, specialty stores, museums, and other retail outlets throughout the country.
