= List of Mad episodes =

Series poster

This is a list of the episodes of Mad, an animated comedy sketch television series inspired by Mad magazine that aired on Cartoon Network.

== Series overview ==
Season	Episodes	Originally released	
Season	Episodes	First released	Last released
1	26	September 6, 2010	June 20, 2011
2	26	August 22, 2011	April 23, 2012
3	26	May 28, 2012	March 4, 2013
4	25	April 1, 2013	December 2, 2013

== Episodes ==
=== Season 1 (2010–11) ===
No. overall	No. in season	Title	Written by	Original release date	US viewers (millions)
1	1	"Avaturd / CSiCarly"	Kevin Shinick, Aaron Blitzstein, Susan Clarke, Marly Halpern-Graser, Ben Joseph, Heather Maidat and Mason Steinberg	September 6, 2010	1.95
A parody of Avatar; Jake Smelly is sent by the military to infiltrate a tribe of Na'vi and their sacred tree for the precious mineral, Stupidnamium. A mashup of CSI: Miami and iCarly; during an investigation of a dead man at a T.G.I.X's, Miami's C.S.I. division recruits Carly, Sam, and Freddie as backup to help them solve the case. Other sketches: Mike Wartella short: An astronaut steps in alien poop.; The Bieber Bowl: An ad for a product that gives the user the hairstyle of Justin Bieber.; Mike Wartella short: A boy carves a tattoo onto a sentient tree.; Rejected Transformers: MAD viewers get a look at Autopot, Mowertron, Headgear, and Click, a group of Transformers who didn't make it into the franchise.; Don Martin short: A prince comes to rescue Rapunzel, only to find that the golden locks he is climbing is Rapunzel's armpit hair. Adapted from MAD issue #129.; Zombi: An ad for Disney's newest direct-to-DVD film, where Bambi's mother returns as a zombie.; MAD's Celebrity Birthdays: MAD takes a look at today's birthdays in the world of show business.; Mike Wartella short: A game of Ponzi-poly during family game night takes a turn when the mother lands on the "Go to Jail" space and is almost immediately carted off by police.; Where's Lady Gaga?: In a similar vein to Where's Waldo?, MAD viewers are tasked with finding pop star Lady Gaga in a crowd scene at a high school pep rally. Animated in the style of Sergio Aragonés.; Short: A pumpkin gets cosmetic surgery by being carved.; Spy vs. Spy: As Black Spy guards his private property atop a tree with a bomb by his side, White Spy sneakily places a bowl atop the bomb and then intrudes on Black Spy's property in his tank. Black Spy ignites his bomb, but ends up grabbing the bowl and dropping it on White Spy's head, leaving the bomb behind to blow Black Spy to bits.; Super Villains for Your Health: Sinestro gives two kids advice about yawning being contagious. He offers to cure them with his Yellow Power Ring for five dollars, but vaporizes them instead.; Drawn-Out Dramas: A series of Sergio Aragonés' animated marginals interspersed between sketches.
2	2	"TransBOREmores / Star Wars: The Groan Wars"	Kevin Shinick, Aaron Blitzstein, Susan Clarke, Marly Halpern-Graser, Ben Joseph, Heather Maidat and Mason Steinberg	September 13, 2010	1.75
A spoof of Transformers; Optimus Prime takes advantage of Sam Witwicky by sending him and the other TransBoreMores on a quest for the "Rock of No-Talent-Tron" as an excuse to travel to Hawaii, and make Sam pay for their exotic vacation. A parody of Star Wars: The Clone Wars; the Galactic Republic attempts to thwart the plans of the evil Count Poo-Poo. Other sketches: Short: A kid falls several feet to the ground after being launched into the air by his obese friend on a seesaw.; ePhonie cRap: A parody of an iPhone commercial, advertising the newest ePhonie model, complete with all the best craps.; Mike Wartella short: A clown takes a drink from a water fountain, and his head expands carnival game-style until it bursts.; Ask the Celebrity: Miley Cyrus, Simon Cowell, and Shaun White answer fan letters.; MAD News: An octopus is trying to open a jar of peanut butter.; Mike Wartella short: A dog flies aboard Doggie Air, the only airline where dogs can put their head out the window.; How I Met My Brother: A parody of How I Met Your Mother; a TV show where a boy meets his identical twin for the first time.; Mike Wartella short: A germ auditions for a Jargle mouthwash commercial.; The Wolverclean: An ad for Wolverine's new cleaning product.; Mike Wartella short: An alien asks another why he de-friended him on Spacenook.; The Zit: A man pops a zit and all of his innards burst out. An animated adaptation of Tom Bunk's comic from MAD issue #345.; Spy vs. Spy: Black Spy places what appears to be a giant lit stick of dynamite behind White Spy. White Spy snips off the "fuse", which turns out to be the tail of a lion hidden inside of the "dynamite". Enraged at White Spy for cutting off the tip of its tail, the lion mauls him, to Black Spy's amusement.; Mike Wartella short: Batman ignores the Bat-Signal and sleeps in.; Drawn-Out Dramas: A series of Sergio Aragonés' animated marginals interspersed between sketches.
3	3	"2012 Dalmatians / Grey's in Anime"	Kevin Shinick, Aaron Blitzstein, Susan Clarke, Marly Halpern-Graser, Ben Joseph, Heather Maidat and Mason Steinberg	September 20, 2010	1.51
A mashup of 2012 and One Hundred and One Dalmatians; Dalmatians of all sizes are behind the rampant disasters said to happen in the year 2012 as predicted by the Mayan calendar. A mashup of Grey's Anatomy, Dragon Ball Z, Sailor Moon, Yu-Gi-Oh!, Pokémon, and Voltron; the doctors of Grace Hospital rush to save a patient in critical condition; when the patient is sedated, he hallucinates the operation as a hodgepodge of various anime series. Other sketches: Mike Wartella short: A woman baking gingerbread men is revealed to be a gingerbread serial killer when two gingerbread police officers bust her.; Gross and Beyond Gross: MAD takes a look at gross situations and compares them to situations that are far more gross.; Short: A cat licks herself constantly, much to another cat's disgust.; The Lesser Known Effects of Global Warming: MAD viewers are shown some peculiar potential outcomes of global warming: polar bears relocating to human homes, penguins preying on humans, and Christmas specials including a backstory as to what snow was.; Mike Wartella short: During an airplane safety demonstration on a Slasher Air flight, masks drop down from the panels above the seats - not oxygen masks, but horror movie masks, which three slasher movie killers put on before chasing the panicked passengers.; Keeping Up with the Carcrashians: A promo for a parody of Keeping Up with the Kardashians, where sisters Rim, Towee, and Courtfee crash their cars constantly.; Mike Wartella short: Two astronauts engage in a boxing match in outer space.; Up Balloon System: An ad for a multipurpose balloon system from the makers of the film Up.; Short: At a car dealership, an elephant explains that a car on sale having a small trunk isn't a big problem, but not because he has a trunk, but because he is divorced and his wife took everything. He admits he was joking and that he took most of the possessions before agreeing to purchase the car.; Spy vs. Spy: White Spy sneaks micro-bombs inside of Black Spy's gloves while he sleeps. When Black Spy wakes up, puts on his gloves, and goes out for a stroll, White Spy begins playing a tuba loudly and off-key. Black Spy plugs his ears with his fingers, and the micro-bombs in his gloves detonate, blowing him up.; Mike Wartella short: A robot father gets a gift on Father's Day, which is, much to his chagrin, more oil.; Juicy Jr.'s Triple Pounder: An advertisement for a messy fast-food hamburger that will mess up your shirt, your room, your reputation, and even your life.; Don Martin short: A castaway plucks a lone flower from his island, which springs a leak and sinks. Adapted from MAD issue #83.; MAD's Guide to Celebrity Siblings: MAD presents a look at the less-talented siblings of celebrities, including the Jonas Brothers' sister Merva, Mario and Luigi's other brother Fabrizio, and Emily Osment's brother Haley Joel Osment - who claims he was a prolific child actor, too, much to the narrator's disbelief and denial.; Mike Wartella short: A man named Bob whips out a can opener and begins fixing himself some lunch, only for his wife to point out he's using the can opener on a sandwich.; Drawn-Out Dramas: A series of Sergio Aragonés' animated marginals interspersed between sketches.
4	4	"Star Blecch / uGlee"	Kevin Shinick, Aaron Blitzstein, Susan Clarke, Marly Halpern-Graser, Ben Joseph, Heather Maidat and Mason Steinberg	September 27, 2010	1.76
A parody of Star Trek; Captain Jerk, Schlock, and the rest of the Enterprise crew try to stop Captain Zero from destroying Shlock's home world... by ripping off the plot of Star Wars. A parody of Glee; owing to budget cuts at school and Sue Sylvester's cheerleaders, Will Schuester and the Gleeks must prove that they can bring in the crowds by admitting that their show's premise is no different than the premises of various other musical teen shows. Other sketches: Short: A mouse forgets to buy cheese.; Aberzombie & Stitch: An ad for a parody of Abercrombie & Fitch, specializing in clothes for zombies.; Short: While bobbing for apples, one unlucky boy is dragged into the bucket of water by a monster inside.; Rejected Toy Story 3 Characters: MAD viewers get a look at the characters Speak & Swear, Mr. Couch Potato Head, Baby Never-Stops Crying, Biz the Friendly Fax, and Private Space - all of which never made it into Toy Story 3.; Mike Wartella short: An exterminator finds that a man's house is infested... with ninjas.; Gossip Hurl: A parody of Gossip Girl, chronicling a blog about vomit-related incidents.; Short: Tinker Bell lies motionless on an operating table with two surgeons beside her; one desperate surgeon desperately suggests that if they clap real hard, she'll be resuscitated.; Beauty Tips with Megan Fox: Megan Fox gives beauty tips, and in the process, she is revealed to be a robot.; Short: A red marker gets a call from a yellow marker. The red marker answers "'Yello?", and the yellow marker, assuming he was being called by name, assumes that the red marker has Caller ID.; Spy vs. Spy: Black Spy spots White Spy in a submarine; he knocks his rival out and infiltrates the vessel. He finds a combination lock and cracks it - but it's a trap; the broken lock reveals a hole in the submarine that springs a massive leak, sinking the submarine with Black Spy still inside, as White Spy sits in an inner tube on the water surface, victorious.; No, It's Not!: MAD viewers are treated to a game of No, It's Not! and are challenged to identify a silhouette. And the answer is... snot!; Drawn-Out Dramas: A series of Sergio Aragonés' animated marginals interspersed between sketches.
5	5	"WALL-E-NATOR / Extreme Renovation: House Edition"	Kevin Shinick, Aaron Blitzstein, Marly Halpern-Graser, Ben Joseph, Heather Maidat and Mason Steinberg	October 4, 2010	1.94
A mashup of WALL-E and the Terminator franchise; the WALL-E-NATOR tries to prevent the world from being covered in trash by going back in time to bring down MAD - the "world's biggest producers of garbage". A mashup of Extreme Makeover: Home Edition and Superman: Ty Pennington and the Extreme Renovation crew try to renovate Superman's Fortress of Solitude so he can have a social life. Other sketches: Which Isn't Like the Others?: MAD viewers are tasked with finding out which out of Miley Cyrus, Selena Gomez, and a space alien. The answer: Miley, because the other two both start with the letter "S".; Short: Three kids chasing Happy the Leprechaun encounter his lesser-known brother Bertram, who makes the regular part of Happy Charms cereal, much to the kids' disinterest.; Mike Wartella short: The Nix Kid Pix Awards goes horribly wrong when an award presenter is drenched in slime and turns into a giant reptilian monster who begins to wreak havoc.; MAD's Guide to Phobias: MAD viewers are shown some lesser-known fears, such as Tagophobia, Pantightus, Snowglophobia, and Voltronitis.; Short: A mother feeding her baby at the park meets another woman who is envious, as her kids "eat like a bird"; she then proceeds to chew up a can of worms and regurgitate it into her own babies' mouths. Adapted from MAD issue #383.; The Spatula: A teaser for a parody of The Bachelor starring a spatula who hopes to find a match.; Mike Wartella short: In a whodunit scenario, the detective gathers all suspects to reveal that the killer they are searching for is in the very room they are in... and said killer is already strapped into an electric chair.; Spy vs. Spy: Black Spy fires a torpedo from his ship at White Spy's ship. White Spy reacts quickly and reveals that his ship is two segments connected by a spring by separating the two segments to avoid the torpedo. The torpedo, however, splits into two halves as well, much to White Spy's alarm, as he and his ship are blown up.; Where's Lady Gaga?: In a similar vein to Where's Waldo?, MAD viewers are tasked with finding pop star Lady Gaga in a crowd scene at an amusement park. Animated in the style of Sergio Aragonés.; Short: A toad finds his car has been towed away. Two nearby flies taunt him with the pun that his car got "toad". Unfazed, he simply eats the flies.; Build-a-Bieber: Usher stars in an ad for his Build-A-Bear Workshop-type store where customers can create their own Justin Bieber doll.; Short: Using a permanent marker, a passenger on a bus scribbles over a sign reading "Push Yellow Tape to Request Stop" so that it says "Yell Ape to Request Stop". Another nearby passenger yells "Ape!" much to the first passenger's amusement, only to find out why he screamed it - because an ape is actually on the bus; the ape grabs the first passenger and beats him up.; Drawn-Out Dramas: A series of Sergio Aragonés' animated marginals interspersed between sketches.
6	6	"Pirates of the Neverland: At Wit's End / Batman Family Feud"	Kevin Shinick, Aaron Blitzstein, Susan Clarke, Marly Halpern-Graser, Ben Joseph, Heather Maidat and Mason Steinberg	October 11, 2010	1.83
A mashup of Pirates of the Caribbean: At World's End and Peter Pan; Jack Sparrow tries to help Captain Hook defeat Peter by teaching him his method of pirating. A mashup of Batman and Family Feud; Batman manages to get himself and his family to appear on Family Feud to capture the Riddler, who is somewhere in the TV studio and planning to kidnap the audience. Other sketches: Top 5 Things Katy Perry Kissed, But Didn't Like: Katy Perry kisses various things, a porcupine, tapioca pudding, fish eggs, a mousetrap, and the Liberty Bell, and regrets it.; Short: A "Fart Car" emits farts from its exhaust pipe while driving down the street.; Toys "4" Brats: A parody of the Toys "R" Us chain, advertising various dangerous toys for children.; Short: Two lobsters in a tank are being watched at by various people. One of them thinks he is watching TV, saying he hates the "show," but can't find the remote.; Dinosaurs with Corrected Bird Sound Effects: A professor shows his kids various dinosaur movies, but the dinosaurs make bird sounds.; Mike Wartella short: A man puts a "For Sale" sign on a tree. A customer walks up to the man's house and purchases the tree for himself.; Frog the Bounty Hunter: In a parody of Frogger and Dog the Bounty Hunter, a frog tries to hunt down a kid with ice cream, but get run over by a car while trying to cross the street.; Mike Wartella short: A woman takes her dog, who is wearing a dog cone, out of the vet, but a man screams "Dogaphone!" into the dog, which amplifies his voice like a megaphone.; Exceptions to I before E except after C: A list of all exceptions to the "I before E except after C" grammar rule.; MAD News: A turkey plays pool.; Spy vs. Spy: Black Spy sneaks toward the entrance of White Spy's HQ, holding a bundle of dynamite. When he rings the doorbell, however, two springs crush him. White Spy comes out and wraps Black Spy around the dynamite, leaving him to get blown up.; Mike Wartella short: An old man named Larry prepares to go to sleep, taking himself apart, only for his wife to tell him that he forgot to lock the door, at which point, he puts himself back together.; Celebrities Without Their Makeup: Dwayne Johnson, Amy Winehouse, Iron Man, Maggie Gyllenhaal, and Robert Pattinson are show what they look like without their makeup.; Short: A man uses his snot to defuse a lit bundle of dynamite.; Drawn-Out Dramas: A series of Sergio Aragonés' animated marginals interspersed between sketches.
7	7	"Cliffordfield / Big Time Rushmore"	Kevin Shinick, Aaron Blitzstein, Steve Borst, Marly Halpern-Graser, Ben Joseph, Zack Kahn, Matt Lawton and Mason Steinberg	October 18, 2010	1.92
A mashup of Clifford the Big Red Dog and Cloverfield; Clifford attacks New York City during Zack and Cody's apartment party. A parody of Big Time Rush; Gustavo Rocque recruits George Washington, Thomas Jefferson, Theodore Roosevelt, and Abraham Lincoln as singers for his new boy band, so they can take on King George and the Red Coats at the Battle of the Bands. Other sketches: Vampire Werewolves, Throw Active, Sports O'Clock, In a Fancy Restaurant, Spiderbaby, Frankenstein's Monster Hides in the Lynch Mob, Learn to Read, Rejected Pokémon, Spy vs. Spy, Goomba Murder (two-part sketch), and High School Yearbook Upgrades
8	8	"Fantastic Megan Fox / MAD vs. Wild"	Kevin Shinick, Aaron Blitzstein, Steve Borst, Marly Halpern-Graser, Ben Joseph, Zack Kahn, Heather Maidat and Mason Steinberg	October 25, 2010	2.40
A parody of Fantastic Mr. Fox; Megan Fox, depicted as a literal fox, steals Kristen Stewart's hair, Scarlett Johansson's eyes, and Angelina Jolie's lips in her quest to become the next big movie starlet. A parody of Man vs. Wild; Bear Grylls teaches the viewers how to survive in the wild, with disastrous results. Other sketches: Dora the Explorer in The Road to Recovery, Who Wore it Better?, Klaus' Shöe Garden, Stargazing Couple Identify Orion, Superheroes: They're Just Like Us!, the Umpire Diaries, Cow Comedian, Man's Fly is Down, Spy vs. Spy, Deep Breath Out the Wrong End, Kanye West's Monthly To-Do List, Alien Invader Gets Ridiculed, MAD Security Cam, NetTricks, and Tightrope Academy Graduation
9	9	"I Love You, Iron Man / Ben 10 Franklin"	Kevin Shinick, Aaron Blitzstein, Steve Borst, Marly Halpern-Graser, Ben Joseph, Zack Kahn and Mason Steinberg	November 1, 2010	2.11
A mashup of Iron Man 2 and I Love You, Man; Tony Stark goes through various other superheroes to try and find a guy friend. A parody of Ben 10; After being struck by lightning, Benjamin Franklin obtains a strange device that gives him the power to transform into aliens. Other sketches: MAD News, MAD's Guide to Video Game Cheats, the Taylor Swiffer, This Day in History, Man Paints Insult on His Wife's Rear, the Asker, the Salivation Army, A Look Inside Lil Wayne's Mouth, Spy vs. Spy, Angry Barber Overdoes Customer's Request, and Doggie Tweets
10	10	"Class of the Titans / Zeke and Lex Luthor"	Kevin Shinick, Aaron Blitzstein, Steve Borst, Marly Halpern-Graser, Ben Joseph, Zack Kahn, Matt Lawton, Heather Maidat and Mason Steinberg	November 8, 2010	2.11
A parody of Clash of the Titans; Foul-mouthed transfer student Curseus enrolls in a mortal high school and ultimately takes on the gods in a football game. A parody of Zeke and Luther; When Luther suspiciously goes missing, Zeke is forced to team up with Lex Luthor for a skateboarding competition. Other sketches: MAD News, Styrofoam Cup Call, Cloudy with a Chance of Flavor Breakfast Cereal, Bigfoot Cracks the Liberty Bell, Ask the Celebrity, MADinization, Girl Breaks Up with Gingerbread Man, Man Time Travels Back to the Greatest Moment in his Life, Rejected Girl Pout Cookies, Waterproof Laptop, Spy vs. Spy, Ladybugs in a Bathroom Line, the Transformin' Grill, and Orlando Becomes Zorro
11	11	"S'UP / Mouse M.D."	Kevin Shinick, Aaron Blitzstein, Steve Borst, Marly Halpern-Graser, Zack Kahn and Matt Lawton	November 15, 2010	1.95
A mashup of Up and Jersey Shore; When Carl Fredricksen takes his house to the skies, he winds up meeting the obnoxious cast from Jersey Shore, who annoy him to no end. A mashup of House and Mickey Mouse; Dr. Mouse tries to solve three medical cases involving Cookie Monster, Bob the Builder, and Miley Cyrus. Other sketches: MAD News, Bad Idea, Vampire Helper, Alligator Shops for Shoes, Where is Kristen Stewart Wishing She'd Rather Be?, Strong Guy Poses for a Cutout Photo, The Chirps, MAD Security Cam, Spy vs. Spy, Super Villains For Your Safety, Shax Body Spray, and Genie Bottle Drink
12	12	"Da Grinchy Code / Duck"	Kevin Shinick, Kirill Baru, Aaron Blitzstein, Steve Borst, Susan Clarke, Jacob Fleisher, Marly Halpern-Graser, Ben Joseph, Zack Kahn, Matt Lawton, Heather Maidat, Mason Steinberg and Eric Zimmerman	November 22, 2010	1.84
A mashup of How the Grinch Stole Christmas! and The Da Vinci Code; Robert Langdon (or as he's called here, "a man who looks just like Tom Hanks, with bad hair"), accompanied by Nicolas Cage (as Benjamin Gates) and Indiana Jones, is brought in to figure out who stole Christmas in the town of Whoville. A parody of Chuck; A duck is given top-secret information by mistake and goes undercover to infiltrate a crime ring. Other sketches: MAD News, Snowman's Missing Nose, the Narnia Lunchbox, Rejected Superheroes, Santa's Bill, Celebrities Without Their Makeup: Christmas Edition, Judge Mantis, The Big Bad Wolf Gets Mobbed by Team Jacob Groupies, Spy vs. Spy, and Ice Freezee Machine Malfunctions
13	13	"Snott Pilgrim vs. the Wonderful World of Disney / Malcolm in the Middle Earth"	Kevin Shinick, Aaron Blitzstein, Steve Borst, Susan Clarke, Marly Halpern-Graser, Ben Joseph, Zack Kahn, Matt Lawton, Heather Maidat and Mason Steinberg	February 7, 2011	2.78
A mashup of Scott Pilgrim vs. the World and Snow White; After his breakups with Knives and Flowers, Snott Pilgrim begins dating Snow, but to prove his love, Snott must defeat her seven evil dwarves. A mashup of Malcolm in the Middle and Lord of the Rings; Malcolm competes against the Pevensie kids in the upcoming science fair, while Reese and Dewey (who suspiciously looks like Gollum) fight over possession of the One Ring. Other sketches: MAD News, Dog Digs Up Corpse's Shin, K-Stew's Beef Stew, Superman at the Dry Cleaners, A MAD Look Inside Zach Galifianakis's Bellybutton, Everything is Better with Ninjas!, Monster Plays with his Chemistry Set, Bionic Bach, Papers Meet the Scissors Gang in the Alleyway, Spy vs. Spy, Lightning McQueen Gets Compacted, Villain Hand Sanitizer, and Escargot!
14	14	"Pokémon Park / WWER"	Kevin Shinick, Kirill Baru, Aaron Blitzstein, Steve Borst, Susan Clarke, Jacob Fleisher, Marly Halpern-Graser, Ben Joseph, Zack Kahn, Mason Steinberg and Eric Zimmerman	February 14, 2011	1.86
A mashup of Jurassic Park and Pokémon; a new park for cute Pokémon is unveiled, but things go wrong when some of the Pokémon evolve into their fierce final forms and attack the staff. A mashup of WWE and ER; Superstar doctors and surgeons compete for hospital procedures on another broadcast of the WWER. Other sketches: MAD News, Mailman vs. Dog (three-part sketch), Slop n' Shop, Jack Climbs the Jolly Green Giant's Beanstalk, Candy Hearts You Don't Want to Get, Boy Jumps on his Bed, The Thingy, Fire Extinguisher Begs to be Freed, Spy vs. Spy, Fish Burglars Find Fake Treasure, Donkey Strong, Tightrope Walking, and Cupid Shoots Maid Marian with Robin Hood's Arrow
15	15	"So You Think You Can Train Your Dragon How to Dance / Yo Gagga Gagga!"	Kevin Shinick, Kirill Baru, Aaron Blitzstein, Steve Borst, Jacob Fleisher, Marly Halpern-Graser, Ben Joseph, Zack Kahn, Matt Lawton, Heather Maidat, Mason Steinberg and Eric Zimmerman	February 21, 2011	1.73
A mashup of How to Train Your Dragon and So You Think You Can Dance; Hiccup and Toothless appear in a dance competition to prove that a dragon can be trained to dance, but the show comes to a halt when Red Death crashes the competition for being voted off. A parody of Yo Gabba Gabba!; Lady Gaga's dolls, Taylor Swift, T-Pain, Miley Cyrus, and Triple H become fed-up with her eccentric ways and break free. The outraged Gaga grows into a giant monster that attacks the city. This turns out to be a monster movie DJ Lance Rock watches, believing this would never happen to him, but he is proven wrong when his dolls rope him. Other sketches: MAD News, Pizza Chef Tosses Tomatoes, the Itsy Bitsy Super Spider, the World's First TXT MSG, Ask the Celebrity, Sculptor Finally Gets his Sculpture Right, The Man Who Forgot His Hand is a Bomb, This Day in History, Alligator Bungee Jumping, Spy vs. Spy, Rebus Sentences, P.E.D.A.L., and Chimp Goes Ape at a Restaurant
16	16	"The Straight A-Team / Gaming's Next Top Princess"	Kevin Shinick, Kirill Baru, Aaron Blitzstein, Steve Borst, Jacob Fleisher, Marly Halpern-Graser, Ben Joseph, Zack Kahn, Matt Lawton, Heather Maidat, Mason Steinberg and Eric Zimmerman	February 28, 2011	2.04
A parody of The A-Team; The Straight A-Team comes in to tutor young Alan in all his failing subjects. But when Alan chooses Phineas and Ferb as his science partners, it becomes a competition to see who has the best project. A parody of America's Next Top Model; The competition is down to three contestants, Peach, Zelda, and Samus as they compete for the grand prize – the title of gaming's next top princess. Other sketches: MAD News, The Legend of Clay Aiken, ¡AyCarly!, Pay Day, Iron Man's Irontone, Celebrities Without Their Makeup, Rooster Crow Ringtone, MAD's Snappy Answers to Stupid Questions, Differences Between your Mom and your Dad, MAD Security Cam, A MAD Look Inside Taylor Lautner's Thoughts, Spy vs. Spy, and Two Glasses of Water
17	17	"The Buzz Identity / Two and a Half-Man"	Kevin Shinick, Kirill Baru, Aaron Blitzstein, Steve Borst, Mike Fasolo, Jacob Fleisher, Ben Joseph, Zack Kahn, Matt Lawton, Mason Steinberg, Eric Zimmerman and Marly Halpern-Graser	March 7, 2011	2.12
A mashup of Toy Story 3 and The Bourne Identity; After being stripped of memory from higher ups, Buzz Lightyear must recover his identity. A mashup of Two and a Half Men and The Chronicles of Narnia; Alan has to deal with his hedonistic brother Charlie and his half-centaur son Jake, especially after Jake tramples Alan and Charlie throws a party. Other sketches: MAD News, Mousetrap Safety Instructions, the Heli-Chopper, Now Serving Number 2, Dear Reaper, Arrow on the Man's Head, the Fast and the Curious, Mummy Fails to Go to a Dry Cleaners, Thor plays Bop-a-Rodent, Spy vs. Spy, Club Moon, and Viking Picks Viking
18	18	"Are You Karate Kidding Me? / The Fresh Prawn of Bel-Air"	Kevin Shinick, Kirill Baru, Aaron Blitzstein, Steve Borst, Susan Clarke, Jacob Fleisher, Marly Halpern-Graser, Ben Joseph, Zack Kahn, Matt Lawton, Mason Steinberg and Eric Zimmerman	March 14, 2011	1.92
A parody of The Karate Kid; After being assaulted by Po, Dre Parker must train under Mr. Han to compete against Po in the next fighting tournament. A mashup of District 9 and The Fresh Prince of Bel-Air; After defying orders from the South African government to be relocated to District 10, an alien prawn named Will is forced to move in with his rich relatives in Bel-Air. Other sketches: MAD News, Bad Idea, LeBrowny Paper towels, Chair Taken Out of Wrestling Ring On A Stretcher, Rejected Audition Tapes, MAD's Snappy Answers to Stupid Questions, TMNTMZTV, Rooster Sleeps in, Middle-earth Fantasy Football, Spy vs. Spy, B.O.B.'s Monster Hold Hair Gel, and Bad Interview
19	19	"HOPS / Naru210"	Kevin Shinick, Aaron Blitzstein, Steve Borst, Susan Clarke, Mike Fasolo, Marly Halpern-Graser, Ben Joseph, Zack Kahn, Matt Lawton, Heather Maidat and Mason Steinberg	April 25, 2011	1.63
A mashup of Hop and Cops; When E.B. runs away to Hollywood to start a band, his father calls in the Hops to retrieve him so he can be appointed the role of the new Easter bunny. A mashup of Naruto and 90210; Naruto is enrolled into East Beverly High by the Third Hokage in order to become more mature. However, Naruto adjusts instantly and competes for title of prom king in the hopes that it will lead him one step closer to becoming Hokage. Other sketches: MAD News, Butterfly Sleeping Bag, the Reading Womb, Warning: Thin Ice, Ask the Celebrity, Flattened Man, SoulTron, Something Wrong in Deep Space, Spy vs. Spy, Cullen Clear, and Keebler Elf Strike
20	20	"Ko-Bee Movie / Law & Ogre"	Kevin Shinick, Aaron Blitzstein, Steve Borst, Susan Clarke, Mike Fasolo, Marly Halpern-Graser, Ben Joseph, Zack Kahn, Matt Lawton, Heather Maidat and Mason Steinberg	May 9, 2011	1.88
A parody of Bee Movie; Ko-bee, a bee basketball star, decides to take his skills to the human world, but his dream is soon shot down upon discovering that there's already a famous basketball star named Kobe. After a pep talk from Leigh Anne Tuohy, Ko-bee challenges Kobe to a game of 1 on 1 to decide who will be the superstar Kobe. A mashup of Shrek and Law & Order; When Papa Bear is found murdered in his apartment, Shrek takes the case from under the NYPD and apprehends Grumpy Bear. However, Grumpy Bear is revealed to be innocent, and Yogi Bear reveals he was the culprit. Other sketches: MAD News, Smart Car and Dumb Car, the Underwaker, MADucation 101: Chemistry, Soldier cuts his leg with a sword, Home School Musical, Dummy reads Dummies for Dummies, Accidentally Inventing Electricity, Spy vs. Spy, Prison Execution Prevented by Fart, Villain's Wearhouse, and Execution Waiting Line
21	21	"Pooh Grit / Not a Fan a Montana"	Kevin Shinick, Aaron Blitzstein, Kirill Baru, Steve Borst, Susan Clarke, Jacob Fleisher, Mike Fasolo, Marly Halpern-Graser, Zack Kahn, Matt Lawton, Heather Maidat, Mason Steinberg and Eric Zimmerman	May 16, 2011	2.27
A mashup of The Many Adventures of Winnie the Pooh and True Grit; When Christopher Robin's father is bounced by Tigger, he hires Pooh to apprehend him. However, things turn sour when Jeff Bridges confronts Pooh for stealing his identity, who in turn is confronted by another Jeff Bridges and his younger self. It then becomes a competition as to who will take the glory. A parody of Hannah Montana; When Miley Cyrus starts losing her fans to Justin Bieber, she begins to sabotage him in many styles, including Wile E. Coyote and the Road Runner-style, and learns a strange truth about her friends, her father, and her fame. Other sketches: MAD News, Balloon Animal Comes to Life, Big League Pika Chew, Circus Acts We'd Like to See, Cobrah, She's Definitely Had Work Done, Spy vs. Spy, Bob and Manny Car Crash, the Farto Tuner, and Fish Catches Fisherman
22	22	"The Social Netjerk / Smallville: Turn Off the Clark"	Kevin Shinick, Aaron Blitzstein, Mickey Bloom, Steve Borst, Susan Clarke, Marly Halpern-Graser, Ben Joseph, Zack Kahn, Heather Maidat, Julia Prescott and Mason Steinberg	May 23, 2011	1.86
A parody of The Social Network; When Mark Zuckerberg (as played by Jesse Eisenberg) is dumped by his girlfriend, he decides to create a social website with his friend Eduardo Saverin. The site soon becomes a huge hit, and it isn't long before Zuckerberg is sued by Saverin, the Winklevoss twins, Sean Parker, the real Mark Zuckerberg, and Michael Cera. A mashup of Smallville and Spider-Man: Turn Off the Dark; When the final season of Smallville is finished filming, Clark is approached by Julie Taymor and Bono, who want to continue the series as a musical called Smallville: Turn Off the Clark. Other sketches: MAD News, Silver Rejects the Lone Ranger, MAD Immunity Idol, Duel at One and not Zero, Jersey Thor, MAD Security Cam, Clown Choking, Spy vs. Spy, Airbender Technical Institute, and Snakes Play Sssscraddle
23	23	"TwiGH School Musical / Avenger Time"	Kevin Shinick, Aaron Blitzstein, Mickey Bloom, Steve Borst, Marly Halpern-Graser, Ben Joseph, Zack Kahn, Matt Lawton, Julia Prescott and Mason Steinberg	May 30, 2011	2.12
A mashup of Twilight and High School Musical; When transfer students from East High School arrive at Forks High School, things become difficult for Bella, the Cullen family, and Jacob, who find their upbeat attitude and constant singing annoying. A mashup of The Avengers and Adventure Time; After retrieving the Cosmic Cube from the Red Skull, the Avengers are inadvertently transported to the Land of Ooo. Other sketches: MAD News, Ex-car-libur, ...for Demis book series, Deer Charades, MADucation 101: History, Meep My Dad Says, Fish Market, Go Fish with Bakugan, Spy vs. Spy, Sonic the Hedgehog Brand Sneakers, and Too Much Gum
24	24	"ArTHOR / The Big Fang Theory"	Kevin Shinick, Kirill Baru, Aaron Blitzstein, Mickey Bloom, Steve Borst, Susan Clarke, Jacob Fleisher, Marly Halpern-Graser, Ben Joseph, Zack Kahn, Heather Maidat, Julia Prescott, Mason Steinberg and Eric Zimmerman	June 6, 2011	2.24
A mashup of Arthur and Thor; Odin becomes fed up with his son ArTHOR's spoiled tendencies and excommunicates him out of Asgard until he can prove himself responsible enough wield his powers. Once on Earth, he meets a chameleon named Rango and a mortal girl named Jane. A mashup of Twilight and The Big Bang Theory; Nerdy roommates Edward and Jacob begin fighting over their new neighbor Bella. Other sketches: MAD News, Beachball Freezes During Game, Hulked on Phonics, Behind the Teacher's Back (three-part sketch), Rejected Video Games, Yu-Gi-Bear!, Hand Infiltrates Sock Puppet Lair, Spy vs. Spy, Unicycle Bin, and Alvin and the Monks
25	25	"Ribbitless / The Clawfice"	Kevin Shinick, Kirill Baru, Aaron Blitzstein, Steve Borst, Mike Fasolo, Jacob Fleisher, Marly Halpern-Graser, Zack Kahn, Matt Lawton, Heather Maidat, Mason Steinberg and Eric Zimmerman	June 13, 2011	2.15
A mashup of Limitless and The Muppet Show; When Kermit ingests a butterfly, he mutates into an anthropomorphic form with heightened intelligence. He quickly learns various talents overnight, begins living a hedonistic lifestyle among other humans, and befriends a pig named Piggy and a bear named Fozzie, who also have heightened traits. However, Kermit still desires exploit his abilities even more. With Fozzie and Piggy's help, he auditions for American Idol, but is rejected on the grounds that the show doesn't accept animals. Kermit decides to revive The Muppet Show in retaliation and have Limitless star Bradley Cooper as its first guest star. A mashup of The Office and X-Men; The Scranton branch of the Dunder Miffin paper company receives several new employees from Xavier's School for Gifted Youngsters led by Wolverine. Other sketches: MAD News, Wrecking Water Balloon, Gorilla Positioning System, A Look Inside Robert Pattinson's Hair, Seattle: Los Angeles, Ming Ming at the Spewwing Bee, MAD Security Cam, Spy vs. Spy, Gross and Beyond Gross, High School Musical Song Collection Volume 44 Book 12, and Mount Katchaneyefull Erupts
26	26	"Force Code / Flammable"	Kevin Shinick, Kirill Baru, Aaron Blitzstein, Steve Borst, Susan Clarke, Mike Fasolo, Jacob Fleisher, Marly Halpern-Graser, Ben Joseph, Zack Kahn, Matt Lawton, Heather Maidat, Mason Steinberg and Eric Zimmerman	June 20, 2011	1.80
A mashup of A New Hope and Source Code; Colter Stevens is mentally transported back in time several times to try and prevent the destruction of the Death Star. After failing each time, he decides to hide out on Alderaan, only for him to be caught in its own inevitable explosion. Finally, in frustration, he asks how the process works, resulting in his mind exploding. A musical parody of "Firework"; Katy Putty's new song "Flammable" gives hope to clay, paper, and wool characters who feel rejected by society – but all of them burst into flames and melt due to the fireworks they release. Other sketches: MAD News, Popcorn Rescues Corn Kernels, What's in a Name?, GleeVR, Davy Jones' One Foot Locker, Animal vs. Appliance, Duck Duck Zeus, Movie Titles in Japan, U2PS World Tour!!!!!, This Day in History, Spy vs. Spy, the Early Bird Catches the Ant, Superhero 6 Motel, and Leonardo da Vinci Paints the Mona Lisa with Her Eyes Closed

=== Season 2 (2011–12) ===
No. overall	No. in season	Title	Written by	Original release date	US viewers (millions)
27	1	"RiOa / Thomas the Unstoppable Tank Engine"	Kevin Shinick, Aaron Blitzstein, Steve Borst, Marly Halpern-Graser and Greg White	August 22, 2011	2.33
A mashup of Rio and Green Lantern; While walking along the beach, Blu happens to sees a green light streak by and goes to investigate. There, he interrupts Abin Sur's demise, takes the Lantern ring from Hal Jordan, and teleports to planet Oa. However the guardians immediately reject Blu on the grounds that the Lantern Corp. doesn't accept birds. In retaliation, Blu breaks the Lantern Corps vending machine of rings and instructs them to seek out other fictional flightless birds and make them Green Lanterns. Together, the birds rescue Jewel from Nigel and Marcel. A mashup of Thomas & Friends and Unstoppable; Sir Topham Hatt gives Thomas a tune-up, but before his brakes can be reinstalled, Thomas begins to roll away and is about to crash into a nearby town. Hatt enlists help from Frank Barnes, who first orders Harold to shoot at Thomas, but when Hatt tells Barnes that Thomas is carrying pillows, soft cheeses, and a nuclear bomb, Barnes uses Percy to guide him to Thomas before Harold accidentally blows up the nuclear bomb while shooting at him. When Barnes finds out the town Thomas was about to crash into was the town of Strawberry Shortcake, he lets Thomas run over it. Other sketches: MAD News, Sentenced... to Dance, Jedi Negotiator, Snake eats Simon & Theodore, Punching Angelo, Hole in the Great Wall, Tomato's Friend Changes, Spy vs. Spy, the Sleepy Cloud, and Evil Medieval Comes Home
28	2	"Super 80's / Captain America's Got Talent"	Kevin Shinick, Kirill Baru, Aaron Blitzstein, Steve Borst, Jacob Fleisher, Marly Halpern-Graser, Matt Lawton and Eric Zimmerman	August 29, 2011	1.94
A parody of Super 8; In the midst of filming, the cast and crew of Super 8 get an unpleasant surprise when a train full of 1980s memorabilia (including Rubik's Cubes, MC Hammer, and Madonna) crashes, flooding the town they are filming in with a deadly 1980s pop culture invasion. Eventually, J. J. Abrams concludes that the 1980s' intentions are rather genuine, and they are really trying to build a spaceship to return to where they came from – which turns out to be Steven Spielberg, who ordered the 1980s to save his career and make a sequel to Batteries Not Included. However, Abrams wants to make the film, himself, and jumps a pickup truck into Spielberg's house in retaliation. A mashup of Captain America and America's Got Talent; When S.H.I.E.L.D. begins looking for recruits to form the Avengers, Captain America offers to join. However, the recruiters don't believe he's qualified to join on the technicality that he doesn't actually have superpowers. So he puts together a talent show, with Piers Morgan as judge, to show off his skills. At first the recruiters are not impressed with Captain America's acts, until he sings "I Dreamed a Dream". Once Captain America is made a member, he immediately quits and reveals that he is actually James Franco, whose ambition for being an Avenger was to add another achievement to his growing resume. When the real Captain America is found tied up under the table, Iron Man calls up Spider-Man to tell him that he's now a member of the group. Other sketches: MAD News, Mr. Peanut Gets Eaten, Celebrity Masks, MAD's Snappy Answers to Stupid Questions, Pinocchio 2: Boy, Oh Boy, Real Life is Hard, Spy vs. Spy, a Buzz in my Ear, the Car Alarm Clock, and Man Pretends to Be Windshield Wipers
29	3	"Kung Fu Blander / Destroy Bob the Builder Destroy"	Kevin Shinick, Aaron Blitzstein, Steve Borst, Marly Halpern-Graser, Ben Joseph, Zack Kahn, Matt Lawton, Mason Steinberg and Greg White	September 5, 2011	2.39
A parody of Kung Fu Panda 2; The Soothsayer tells Po of an ancient prophecy wherein an evil peacock with a powerful weapon will try and destroy all of kung fu, and that only a black and white force can stop him. Suddenly, Lord Shen appears and uses his weapon of angry birds on Po and the Furious Five. When the five is each taken out, Po concludes that he is the prophesied black and white force. However, he too is overcome by Lord Shen's attacks, and begins searching for other black and white things to use (including Looney Tunes character Pepé Le Pew, the penguins from the movie adaptation of Mr. Popper's Penguins starring Jim Carrey, and Reshiram and Zekrom from Pokémon Black and White). When they each fail, Po declares that the prophecy was wrong. But the Soothsayer reveals that the prophecy was actually written in an issue of Mad, and that the black and white force is none other than the black and white spies. A mashup of Bob the Builder and Destroy Build Destroy; After finishing a job, Bob and his team of construction vehicles are abruptly greeted by Andrew W.K. and his Destroy Build Destroy team. Under W.K.'s orders, the team destroys Scoop and Lofty, rebuilds them into catapults, and uses them for a watermelon-launching contest. At his breaking point, Bob fights back by having his equipment form Buildtron and attacking Andrew W.K.. Other sketches: MAD News, Pencil Haircut, Red Skull, the Greatest Thing Ever!, Han Solo and Gretel, Cow Needs a Refill, Spy vs. Spy, Microphone Collection at Press Conference, QuickerSand and QuickishSand, and Hot Dog with Everything Guest star: Andrew W.K.
30	4	"Pirates of the Pair of Tweens / Konan the Kardashian"	Kevin Shinick, Aaron Blitzstein, Marly Halpern-Graser and Greg White	September 12, 2011	1.78
A parody of Pirates of the Caribbean: On Stranger Tides; After finding the Fountain of Youth, Angelica and Blackbeard drink its waters in the hopes of living forever. However, by using crazy straws to drink it, the fountain's waters regresses the duo into their tweens, much to Jack Sparrow's dismay, as he is now forced to take care of them. He reluctantly takes them to the mall, where they do nothing but shop and play without end. Eventually, Jack has enough and turns to Willy Wonka for help. Wonka happens to have a formula, disguised as frozen yogurt, that will turn the kids back to their normal ages, which Jack gives to the kids. Unfortunately, the formula causes the kids to turn into anamorphic blueberries that swell up and explode. Wonka explains that there was a mix-up from his new workers, the Alfa-Alfas. A mashup of Conan the Barbarian and Keeping Up with the Kardashians; In his quest to seek revenge against Khalar Zym, Conan learns through Wikipedia that his path will intertwine with a powerful girl. To Conan's shock, this girl is none other than Kim Kardashian, who immediately declares him her new fiancée. Now Conan is faced with the objective of meeting her family. Through these meetings, he finds that Khalar has been working as Kris Jenner's assistant. A battle ensues throughout the streets of L.A., before it reaches its end at Mann's Chinese Theatre, where Conan defeats Khalar by using Ed Asner's walk of fame star. In recognition of this feat, Conan is made honorary governor of California. However, Conan rejects the offer, feeling his place is beside Kim. Other sketches: MAD News, Fish astronaut gets Eaten, Transformal Wear, Baby Bird Feeding Protest, The Curious Case of Benjamin Batman, Spy vs. Spy, the Do-Over Button, and Robot Robbers
31	5	"Fast Hive / Minute to Flynn It"	Kevin Shinick, Aaron Blitzstein, Marly Halpern-Graser and Greg White	September 19, 2011	1.82
A mashup of Winnie-the-Pooh and Fast Five; When Winnie the Pooh's latest attempt to steal honey from a beehive fails, he turns to Dominic Toretto for help. Dom quickly devises a complicated plan using a ramp and custom street cars. However, the plan works too well and everybody leaves the storybook entirely, each of them landing in other books (Pooh into Where the Wild Things Are, Tigger and Piglet into The Very Hungry Caterpillar, and Eeyore into Everybody Poops), whose inhabitants graciously share their honey. As for Dom, he ends up in a novelization of Cars. A mashup of Tron: Legacy and Minute to Win It; Sam Flynn visits his father in the Tron arcade game, where he is greeted by his father's clone, Clu. Clu challenges Sam to prove that he is the superior player on the grid with various mediocre challenges. In the final challenge, to see who can balance an egg on their head while riding a light cycle the longest, Sam questions why his father would design such a stupid game. Out in the real world, Kevin Flynn is discussing with Guy Fieri about how the game would make a great TV show. Other sketches: MAD News, Mailbox Dreams his Revenge, Celebrities Without Their Makeup, Maximum Security Diary Vault, MAD Security Cam, America's Got Talons, Spy vs. Spy, Shazamwich!, and Real Skeleton in Class
32	6	"Cowboys & Alien Force / ThunderLOLcats"	Kevin Shinick, Aaron Blitzstein, Marly Halpern-Graser and Greg White	September 26, 2011	1.22
A mashup of Cowboys & Aliens and Ben 10: Alien Force; Jake Lonergan awakens to find a strange device attached to his wrist and his memory gone. A passerby informs him that the device is the Omnitrix, which belonged to Ben Tennyson before Jake knocked him unconscious. Jake then kills the passerby, changes the story's title, and heads for the nearest town, where Woodrow Dolarhyde and several men ambush him. Ella Swenson informs everybody that something is coming, as another bracelet on Jake's arm is glowing. Suddenly, the town is attacked by a hoard of colorful flying ponies, and a mothership that also capture the townsfolk. Without thinking, Jake takes out one of the ponies with one of the bracelets. He then discovers that also has Silly Bandz on his wrist, which blast Ella into dust. She reassembles herself and explains that she is not human, having taken a human form so Jake would love her. When the two kiss, she changes into her true form – a pony. She states that her real name is Applejack, and that her people are also looking for the kidnappers. Jake and Applejack head for the mothership and learn that the culprit is actually Jon Favreau. Favreau explains that he has been kidnapping people so he can force them to write the perfect script to finish Cowboys & Aliens. Jake states that mashing up two genres like cowboys and aliens isn't a difficult feat, as MAD does it all the time. This prompts Favreau to kidnap Alfred Neuman, who writes the story as Cowboys & Alfreds. A parody of ThunderCats; For centuries, a prophecy has told that a great hero would rise and protect the Thundercats from a great evil. However, Lion-LOL is far too obsessed with the Internet, much to the chagrin of the other ThunderCats, who believe that the Internet is just a myth. Suddenly, the Dogmen begin attacking the city of Thundera. Lion-LOL insists that the Dogmen have harnessed the power of the Internet and, through trolling, Troll-Ra (disguised as Panthro) knocks out Claudus and blasts Lion-LOL. Lion-LOL finds himself inside the Internet, where he learns that only way to defeat Troll-Ra is with "even stupider memes". When Lion-LOL comes to, he takes the Sword of Omens and attacks as a Nyan Cat. Other sketches: MAD News, Out of Order, 9-Voltron Battery, Mount Rushmore's Backside, What Would Boba Fett Do?, Imaginary Friends: Where Are They Now?, Spy vs. Spy, Superkhakis, and Wolves: We're Still Out There
33	7	"TransBOREmores 3: Dark of the Blue Moon / The Walking Fred"	Kevin Shinick, Kirill Baru, Aaron Blitzstein, Steve Borst, Jacob Fleisher, Marly Halpern-Graser, Greg White and Eric Zimmerman	October 3, 2011	1.43
A mashup of Transformers: Dark of the Moon with The Smurfs; When the Decepticons use a pillar to open a portal to Cybertron, they accidentally send the Smurfs over to Sam in Chicago while the Decepticons arrive in New York with Patrick. Sam makes arrangements with Patrick to meet up so they can send both of their visitors back to their respective points of origin. In the meantime, Patrick takes the Decepticons on a tour of the city and to see some Broadway shows, while Sam has to put up with Optimus and the Smurfs' annoying tendencies throughout the long drive. Sam finally meets up with Patrick, but the pillar was accidentally left in Youngstown, Ohio with Brainy Smurf. Patrick instead borrows Mjolnir and sends everybody back to their dimensions, with the exception of Optimus, who left to play on a walking piano with Tom Hanks. A mashup of The Walking Dead and Fred Figglehorn; While on a camping trip, Justin Bieber and Selena Gomez are attacked and bitten by a zombified Fred, causing them to take on his characteristics. Soon after, most of Hollywood is taken over by the Fred zombies, something that is pointed out by Tom Hanks and Julia Roberts' agent after the failure of Hanks' film Larry Crowne. Both Hanks and Roberts are forced to run when the Fred zombies begin attacking their agent's office. The two celebrities take refuge in a sporting goods store with Bruce Willis, but the three are eventually bitten by the zombies. They then go on to produce the fourth installment to the Ocean's series, Ocean's Fourteen. Other sketches: MAD News, Christopher Coolumbus, Angry Bird Management, Singing Knight-gram, Theme Park Rides We'd Love to See, Project Runway, Spy vs. Spy, Magic Gel and Pet Shell, and the Floor Really is Lava
34	8	"X Games: First Class / Criminal Minecraft"	Kevin Shinick, Aaron Blitzstein, Steve Borst, Marly Halpern-Graser and Greg White	October 17, 2011	1.21
A mashup of the X Games and X-Men: First Class; In their quest to recruit new students to save the world, Charles Xavier and Erik Lehnsherr inadvertently recruit Shaun White, Ryan Sheckler, and Ashley Fiolek. Together, Xavier and Lehnsherr train the recruits and send them off to fight Sebastian Shaw, his organization the Hellfire Club, and "anyone he knows within six degrees of him", only for them to be killed and Xavier to take their place in the X Games. A mashup of Minecraft and Criminal Minds; When several murders occur within the world of Minecraft, Morgan and Rossi are sent to investigate. It is ultimately revealed that the culprit is none other than Mark Zuckerberg, who has been killing Minecraft players as revenge for the game being a bigger waste of time than Facebook. Other sketches: MAD News, the Grim Reaper Ruins His TV Night, Kirby's Star Tours, Balloon Salesman Pop, Sassie, Spy vs. Spy, Hamster Gym, MAD Security Cam, Gandalf's 3 Ring Binder, and Girl Plays Hide and Seek in a Vacuum
35	9	"Kitchen Nightmares Before Christmas / How I Met Your Mummy"	Kevin Shinick, Aaron Blitzstein, Steve Borst, Marly Halpern-Graser and Greg White	October 24, 2011	1.47
A halloween mashup of Kitchen Nightmares and The Nightmare Before Christmas; After starring in so many kitchen reality shows, Gordon Ramsay becomes bored with the repetitive grind and longs for something new. He suddenly falls through a trap door and lands in Halloween Town, just as the citizens are in the middle of a cook-off. He begins to berate their progress and orders each one to start over, much to the horror of the monster chefs. The Mayor informs Jack Skellington of Ramsay's arrival, stating that Ramsay's brutal honesty is more horrifying than Skellington himself. Seeing that he has been bested, Jack asks Ramsay for advice to deal with his own work related doldrums. Ramsay helps Skellington by making him a television executive in his place. A halloween mashup of How I Met Your Mother and The Mummy; Ted, a werewolf, tells his children the day he met their mummy mother. However, each event he chronicles describes an encounter with another random girl mummy, much to the chagrin of the children. Then, their Mummy enters and tells them that she and Ted actually met was at the vet, due to Ted scratching his rear on the carpet. Other sketches: MAD News, Dog as Owner, Dear Reaper, Scream 90X, the Scooby-Doo Gang: Ruining Halloween Since 1969, VeggieTales from the Crypt, Spy vs. Spy, Lloyd's Barbershop Scams a Werewolf, and Bacon and Eggs with a Side of Ghost
36	10	"Dances with Wolverine: A Footloose Parody / Tater Tots & Tiaras"	Kevin Shinick, Kirill Baru, Aaron Blitzstein, Steve Borst, Jacob Fleisher, Marly Halpern Graser, Greg White and Eric Zimmerman	November 7, 2011	1.78
A mashup of Wolverine and Footloose; Wolverine discovers dancing just as it has been outlawed by the local government. When he is commended for his "berserker dance rage" performance by the voices in his head, he speaks before the committee to have the law repealed. A mashup of Toy Story and Toddlers & Tiaras; Mrs. Potato Head chronicles her spoiled, overachieving daughter Savannah's for her participation in a toddler pageant, hoping to score a victory against her rival Kit Kittredge and her daughter Kitty. However, when they win, Mrs. Potato Head steals the trophy, which leaves Savannah threatening to kill her. Other sketches: MAD News, Human Torch Grills Steak, SpongeWow!, Bad Idea, Celebrity Superpowers, Furniture Shopping Disaster, America's Next Top Surgeon, Spy vs. Spy, and Toy Car Crash
37	11	"Demise of the Planet of the Apes / The Celebrity Ape-rentice"	Kevin Shinick, Aaron Blitzstein, Steve Borst, Marly Halpern-Graser and Greg White	November 14, 2011	1.88
A parody of Rise of the Planet of the Apes; After rejecting the living conditions of his house, Will Rodman sends super intelligent chimpanzee Caesar to live at a local sanctuary with several other intelligent primates under the care of Kevin James. James explains that he took the job to get acting advice in the same manner as he got from his role in Zookeeper. The apes are hesitant to work with him until James offers to help them take over the planet by civilizing them. Through James, the apes learn to build an army of some of the most powerful apes, while they suggest to James that he teams up with Hollywood's most powerful ape. Next, they are taught that it's not okay to throw their feces, but the apes insist that it's funny to slap Ben Stiller. Then, the apes are taught that humans are easily distracted through dopey humor, and they should take over a television network to perform stupid acts while sending out subliminal messages. The apes' final step to James is to never make a sequel to Zookeeper. Many years later, after the apes' conquest is complete, James, Oscar in hand, and Sandler come across the remains of the Statue of Liberty, which James is happy to find as he now doesn't have to walk as far up to the top of the statue. A parody of The Apprentice; After passing several aptitude examinations, Caesar, Donkey Kong, and Mojo Jojo are brought before Donald Chimp to compete for a position in his global conglomerate that will take over the world. After having his talents overlooked twice, and being given a job that he can't perform, Donkey Kong questions Chimp's logic, which causes him to be fired. In retaliation, Donkey Kong calls his brother King Kong, who kidnaps Chimp, takes him up to the top floor of Chimp Tower, and meets his end when several of Chimp's biplanes shoot at him, leading him and Chimp to fall to their deaths. Other sketches: MAD News, Monkey Wheel of Fortune (three-part sketch), Ape Sheriff (two-part sketch), Adhesive Ape, Celebrities Without Their Ape-Up, and Spy vs. Spy
38	12	"Moneyball Z / Green Care Bear"	Kevin Shinick, Aaron Blitzstein, Steve Borst, Susan Clarke, Mike Fasolo, Marly Halpern-Graser, Matt Lawton, Heather Maidat, Mason Steinberg and Greg White	November 21, 2011	2.00
A mashup of Dragon Ball Z and Moneyball; Needing new talent for the Oakland A's, Billy Beane drafts Son Goku, Son Goten, Vegeta, Trunks, and Piccolo. During practice, the rookies excel both in the infield and the outfield. However, during the big game, Goku uses the spirit bat, powers up to Super Saiyan 3, and after a long ki build, bunts the ball, allowing him to take first base. Vegeta then takes the spirit bat attempting to do better. A trailer mashup of Green Lantern and Care Bears; While out in the desert one night, Hal Jordan happens upon a dying Good Luck Bear, who appoints him to take his place as the next Green Care Bear. In Care-A-Lot, Hal is trained by Grumpy Bear to take on Funshine Bear, who has become corrupted. Other sketches: MAD News, Tiger Kitty, Barry Kirschbaum: Ghost Attorney, R.I.P. Rodolfo, the Greatest Thing Ever!, The Tide Rolls a Plain Head, Optimus Prime Suspect, Turkey Cooks Himself, Spy vs. Spy, Papa Smurf's Pizza, and Log Saw Ride
39	13	"Spy vs. Spy Kids / The Superhero Millionaire Matchmaker"	Kevin Shinick, Kirill Baru, Aaron Blitzstein, Steve Borst, Jacob Fleisher, Marly Halpern-Graser, Greg White and Eric Zimmerman	November 28, 2011	1.91
A mashup of Spy vs. Spy and Spy Kids: All the Time in the World; Marissa is asked to come out of retirement as a spy by Danger D'Amo, who informs her that the as Black and White Spies have put aside their differences and joined forces. She and her two stepchildren, Rebecca and Cecil, prepare to fight the spies, but the spies infiltrate their headquarters and kill Marissa when she tries to save the children. The twins soon put aside their own differences and take on the spies. Once captured, they discover that the Black and White Spies are actually Danger D'Amo and his twin brother, Timekeeper. The twins are then greeted by their father and the original spy kids, Carmen and Juni Cortez. However, the two turn out to be the real Black and White Spies in disguise, but before they can escape, they are defeated by Marissa, disguised as the twins' father, who is actually the Grey Spy. A parody of The Millionaire Matchmaker; Patti Stanger attempts to match up Batman and Iron Man with an eligible bachelorette. However, their self-centered and super-heroic tendencies turn away from every girl they are paired up with. Iron Man is unknowingly paired with Catwoman, who ultimately robs him blind. Other sketches: MAD News, Tummy Duck, Nancy Ortega's School of Dance and Martial Arts, Beware of Frog, Abs-Duction, MAD Security Cam, Arcade Kid, Spy vs. Spy, Mickey Mouse Mouse Exterminator Service, and Shark in the Ball Pit
40	14	"Captain American't / My Supernatural Sweet 16"	Kevin Shinick, Kirill Baru, Aaron Blitzstein, Steve Borst, Mike Fasolo, Jacob Fleisher, Marly Halpern-Graser, Greg White and Eric Zimmerman	December 5, 2011	2.01
A parody of Captain America: The First Avenger; Scrawny weakling Steve Rogers is transformed into a buff super soldier to entertain the troops at the USO show. When Bucky Barnes is kidnapped by the Red Skull, Steve puts himself at the risk of certain death to save him. Once rescued, Steve and Bucky go after the Red Skull, but Bucky loses his life in the process of landing on the escape plane. Once inside the cockpit, Steve smashes the Tesseract, which causes the Red Skull to disappear in a flash of light. Since the plane has active explosives and no place to land, Steve has no choice but to crash the plane to the Arctic ice and freeze himself. Once there, Steve decides to pass the time by watching King Kong on DVD. After 70 years, he is thawed partially by Scrat. Steve shrugs it off on the notion that the Avengers will find him. However, Lady Gaga is chosen as the first Avenger. A mashup of Supernatural and My Super Sweet 16; Sam and Dean receive a mission to exorcise a demon possessing a young girl. They happen upon rich girl Ashlyn, who is busily preparing for her sweet sixteen party. Ashlyn does show the telltale signs of a demonic possession victim, but on the day of the party, as they try to exorcise her, the duo learn she is not the possessed girl in their mission log. The girl in question is actually the girl living next door, and Ashlyn is merely a spoiled brat. Sam and Dean manage to exorcise the demon from the neighbor girl, causing Ashlyn to have a double sweet sixteen party with the demon, much to the dismay of everybody else, including Satan. Other sketches: MAD News, Nothing Got Wrinkled, Ghost Rider's Training Wheels, Potato Calls a Tomato Tomahto, How I Left Your Brother (At a Highway Rest Stop), Cheese at the End of the Maze?, Spy vs. Spy, Clifford's Notes, and the Tin Man Steals a Heart
41	15	"FROST / Undercover Claus"	Kevin Shinick, Aaron Blitzstein, Steve Borst, Matt Lawton, Marly Halpern-Graser and Greg White	December 12, 2011	2.19
A christmas mashup of Toy Story, Rudolph the Red-Nosed Reindeer, and Lost; While on Christmas vacation, Woody and the gang end up being dropped out of the plane and landing on the Island of Misfit Toys. They are greeted by King Moonracer and the other misfit toys, who invite them to stay. Soon, they find a mysterious door to a room with an old Commodore 64 and a countdown clock. In song, the misfit toys explain that the clock counts down either to Christmas or the end of the world. The toys also sing that they've never experienced Christmas since they reset the clock every December 24th. Knowing what will happen, Woody suggests that the misfits allow the clock to reach 25. They follow Woody's advice, and when day arrives, Santa appears, offering to give the toys new homes. Suddenly, Yukon Cornelius appears with the Abominable Snow Monster, insisting that the creature is harmless, When the Bumble eats Santa anyway, Cornelius resets the counter to the date of the monster's next bowel movement. A christmas parody of Undercover Boss; Santa decides to go undercover as one of his elves to see how hard their jobs are. Unfortunately, Santa proves to be very bad at the tasks given to him, and ends up burning down his workshop. This prompts him to have the elves go out and buy gift cards in bulk, and ends with him being attacked by his wife with a frying pan. Other sketches: MAD News, Warning: Time Machines Are Not Toys (two-part sketch), Tree Bazooka 9000, Rejected Reindeer, MAD Security Cam, Snowman vs. Wild, Spy vs. Spy, and Merry Christmas, Charlie Sheen!
42	16	"Twilight: Staking Dawn / Cookie Blue"	Kevin Shinick, Aaron Blitzstein, Steve Borst, Marly Halpern-Graser, Matt Lawton and Greg White	January 23, 2012	1.68
A mashup of The Twilight Saga: Breaking Dawn – Part 1 and Buffy the Vampire Slayer; Edward and Bella's wedding ceremony is interrupted by Buffy Summers, who begins killing all the vampires in attendance. Edward and Bella flee with Buffy in hot pursuit before she traps them on the edge of a cliff. Before Buffy can kill them, Bella asks why she wants to kill her, since Edward never made her into a vampire like she asked. Buffy states that her reason for doing so is that she views Bella as a pathetic female protagonist. Bella replies that there is actually someone far worse than she is, prompting the girls to lynch Whitney Cummings. With Whitney's main star now out of commission, the director has both Buffy and the suddenly-pregnant Bella to star in a replacement sitcom, Two and a Half Women. A mashup of Sesame Street and Rookie Blue; Cookie Monster is recruited to the Toronto police department, and his first assignment is investigating the robbery of a bakery. He then begins to look down Crime Alley for suspects, and finds a guy hiding in a trash can whom he thinks is the Canadian equivalent of Oscar the Grouch, force-feeding the man garbage and making him confess to the robbery. Other sketches: MAD News, Bad Idea (two in the episode), PokéHarmony, Cat Gets the Cuckoo Bird, MAD Security Cam, Promise Me You'll Shave that Mustache, the Land After the Land Before Time, the Reason Why the Chicken Crossed the Road, Spy vs. Spy, and the Greatest Thing Ever!
43	17	"WWe Bought a ZOO / 2 Broke Powerpuff Girls"	Kevin Shinick, Aaron Blitzstein, Mickey Bloom, Steve Borst, Marly Halpern-Graser, Julia Prescott and Greg White	January 30, 2012	1.90
A parody of We Bought a Zoo; Benjamin Mee buys a local zoo for his family, but the zoo is immediately seized by wrestlers from the WWE. They begin training the animals to be wrestlers for an upcoming match. The sport proves to be more successful than the human version, causing the human wrestlers to become unemployed. A mashup of The Powerpuff Girls and 2 Broke Girls; Following the permanent hiatus of The Powerpuff Girls, Bubbles and Buttercup attempt to make it on their own by getting a job at Him's diner, but their inability to properly wait on their customers cause them to get fired by Him. They then attempt at pan handling, but they fail to make rent, forcing them to be evicted from their apartment by Mojo Jojo. With nowhere else to turn, the girls return to their successful sister Blossom and admit that she was the backbone of the team. They end up getting hired at Blossom's own diner. Other sketches: MAD News, the Grim Reaper Tricks a Victim, Final Brantasy, Football Players Open a Locker, Psych: A show that's nothing like the title suggests, Rejected Smurfs, Spy vs. Spy, ThunderPants, and Snowman Drinks Hot Coffee
44	18	"DolPhineas and Ferb Tale / VICTORious"	Kevin Shinick, Aaron Blitzstein, Steve Borst, Marly Halpern-Graser and Greg White	February 6, 2012	2.39
A mashup of Dolphin Tale and Phineas and Ferb; when Sawyer Nelson finds Winter the tailless dolphin stranded on the beach, Phineas and Ferb offer to help build a suitable prosthetic for the dolphin. Their first few attempts backfire until they build a helmet that increases Winter's brain activity, giving her telekinesis in the process. To test her abilities, they enter her in a half-machine competition against Hiccup and Toothless, and Cyborg. Winter proves to a formidable opponent, taking out Hiccup and Toothless. But before she can beat Cyborg, Morgan Freeman appears, informing the audience that regardless of who wins the race, the important thing is that everybody learns that when messing with balance of nature, use robot parts. He then reveals that he now has rocket feet like Cyborg's, which cause him to crash when he runs out of gas. A parody of Victorious; The students of the Hollywood Arts High School prepare for a yodeling mime competition, but their newest classmate, Doctor Doom, prepares to win the competition by cheating. Doom has Robbie Shapiro enhance his armor, but during his performance, the armor overloads and causes Doom to be disqualified. However, as a consolation, Robbie reveals to Doom that he is actually Andy Samberg, who introduces him to Justin Timberlake. The three of them then take a road trip to Disneyland. Other sketches: MAD News, Clown Dinner, DVR2D2, Polka Goat at a Meeting, Man finds Dog in the Snow, Doughboy Poking Support Group, Spy vs. Spy, What's Wrong with This Picture?, and Magician Misfires his Rabbit Trick
45	19	"My Little War Horse / The Tonight Show with Jay Lion-O"	Kevin Shinick, Kirill Baru, Aaron Blitzstein, Steve Borst, Mike Fasolo, Jacob Fleisher, Marly Halpern Graser, Greg White and Eric Zimmerman	February 13, 2012	1.98
A mashup of My Little Pony: Friendship Is Magic and War Horse; During the Great War, Captain Nicholls comes to Albert Narracott to buy a horse for the cavalry. Rather than buying his colt Joey, he takes Narracott's other horse Pinkie Pie, much to everybody's surprise. Soon, Pinkie is put through basic training, and then is sent out on the front line to fight the opposing unicorns led by Twilight Sparkle, who prove to be a formidable army. Meanwhile, Narracott decides to go after Pinkie Pie and braves the English Channel to reach her. When he reaches to the shores of France, Narracott decides to call for help from Tintin. They then take the Unicorn to the battlefield just as both factions come to terms. (Note: Tara Strong reprises her role as Twilight Sparkle from Friendship is Magic.) A mashup of ThunderCats and The Tonight Show with Jay Leno; Jay Lion-O welcomes his guest Ryan Gosling (who is starring in Crazy Stupid LOLCats with Cheetara), and treats the audience to a musical performance by Mumm-Ra & Sons. Jay also takes to the streets in his "Catwalking" segment, where he humiliates people by asking them "simple questions". Other sketches: MAD News, Dog's People Door, Magic Magic Marker, Scarecrow Becomes a Saiyan, Office Yak, Teen Titanic, Spy vs. Spy, Goalies Save the Day!, and Shooting Star
46	20	"Al Pacino and the Chipmunks / That's What Super Friends Are For"	Kevin Shinick, Kirill Baru, Aaron Blitzstein, Steve Borst, Jacob Fleisher, Marly Halpern-Graser, Ben Joseph, Mason Steinberg, Greg White and Eric Zimmerman	February 27, 2012	1.78
A parody of Alvin and the Chipmunks: Chipwrecked; When Dave takes the Chipmunks on a cruise, the ship crashes into an iceberg. The Chipmunks ends up marooned on a deserted island with Al Pacino, who came to the island to prepare for a role in Godfather Island, but has since developed amnesia. He then decides to make the best of it and offers to join the Chipmunks in recording their next album. During a terrible rehearsal, Dave (who had been stranded on a different deserted island with Robert De Niro) appears after finding a flyer for their island concert, which Pacino had sent to everybody in the music industry. As a result of these flyers, a boat with various Hollywood moguls arrives, but they are mostly killed by Pacino's leopard roommate upon arrival. However, Pacino merely shrugs at this, stating to Dave and the chipmunks that they only needed their boat. A musical parody of Super Friends; When the lesser known Super Friends feel rejected by Superman, Wonder Woman, and Batman, Plastic Man and Black Lightning lead them into a musical performance, through which they express their feelings of not living up to their team name. Upon hearing this, Superman suggests that the team be renamed to the Justice League and Batman orders the team to get him a soda. Other sketches: MAD News, Bad Idea, Green Goblin Green Beans, Grim Reaper's Prank Toaster, Taylor Lautner's Deleted Twilight Shirtless Scenes, Man Sees "the Alps" Through Binoculars, I Hate My Teenage Otter, MAD Security Cam, Spy vs. Spy, Shredding Printer, and Eat-Ohs
47	21	"Real Veal / Celebrity Wife Swamp"	Kevin Shinick, Aaron Blitzstein, Steve Borst, Marly Halpern-Graser, Zack Kahn and Greg White	March 5, 2012	1.79
A parody of Real Steel; Charlie Kenton tries to reclaim his former boxing glory by coaching a robot to fight in the ring. But when his son Max points out the superior moves of a cow, Charlie integrates the cow into the robot and dubs creation "Real Veal". In time, Real Veal climbs the ranks, reaching the title match against Bumblebee. As a tactic, Charlie instructs Real Veal to follow Charlie's every move, which causes Real Veal to lose to Bumblebee anyway. Unfortunately for the Kentons, all the fights have put Charlie in massive debt, forcing them to live off of Real Veal's remains for the next several months. A mashup of Shrek and Celebrity Wife Swap; Since their careers have slowed down, Brad Pitt and Angelina Jolie, along with Shrek and Fiona, decide to exchange families for the show Celebrity Wife Swamp. At first, things seem okay between the new couplings, until Pitt feels that his ego being bruised by Shrek and Jolie's chemistry. Pitt decides to terminate his contract, but contract holder Rumpelstiltskin states that his contract is forever binding. Hearing this, Pitt begs for his old wife back, but he only gets instead his ex-wife Jennifer Aniston. Seeing this, Pitt then decides that he's better off with Fiona. Other sketches: MAD News, The Reason Why Mexican Jumping Beans Jump, People Who Wait 'Til the Last Minute today on Ellen (two-part sketch), Elephant Forgets His Password, Scooby Snacks Are Not a Good Plan, Spy vs. Spy, Superwatch, and Push Your Luck
48	22	"Garfield of Dreams / I Hate My Teenage Mutant Ninja Turtles"	Kevin Shinick, Kirill Baru, Aaron Blitzstein, Steve Borst, Jacob Fleisher, Marly Halpern-Graser, Greg White and Eric Zimmerman	March 26, 2012	1.58
A parody of Field of Dreams; While at his country home one night, Seth MacFarlane is greeted out of the neighboring cornfield by Garfield and several vintage comic strip characters. As the characters have become forgotten in recent years and MacFarlane has the ability to make "anything" enjoyable, the characters have sought him out to help them find a new audience. MacFarlane quickly goes and invites several Hollywood moguls over to his home for a business dinner, where the moguls decide to reinvent the characters' personas with mash-up sequels of existing movies. However, the comic characters revolt at the sight of the trailers, as they merely wanted to be rediscovered instead of reinvented. When the characters attack, MacFarlane wakes up, revealing that the events were merely a dream. He quickly comes to the conclusion that it's best to focus on the present rather than the past, and proceeds to create a new show that is identical to his previous works. A mashup of Teenage Mutant Ninja Turtles and I Hate My Teenage Daughter; Annie Watson decides to go on a date with Shredder, much to her mutant turtle sons' disapproval. Believing that the date is a part of an evil plan to kill their family, the Turtles follow Watson around, hoping to stop Shredder before he can do harm to her. Each time Shredder appears to attempt an attack, the Turtles fail to save her, and Shredder only proves himself to be well-behaved. The end of the date, however, is when Shredder reveals that not only was his plan to settle down with Watson, but to also destroy the Turtles' home with the Technodrome. Other sketches: MAD News, Bobo Marries his Balloon, What's Wrong with This Picture?, the Left Hand of Doom, Dr. Glass Johnson, Real Ducky Takes a Bath with his Rubber Boy, Stapler at the Dentist, Lancing with the Stars, Robots of Humanco, Thor Uses the Mjolnir on a Construction Site, Spy vs. Spy, and Wizard or Crazy Person
49	23	"The Adventures of TaunTaun / Everybody Loves Rayman"	Kevin Shinick, Kirill Baru, Aaron Blitzstein, Mickey Bloom, Steve Borst, Jacob Fleisher, Marly Halpern-Graser, Julia Prescott, Greg White and Eric Zimmerman	April 2, 2012	2.03
A mashup of The Empire Strikes Back and The Adventures of Tintin; A TaunTaun buys a model star destroyer in a bottle while on an outing. When he returns home, he accidentally breaks the model and finds a document titled "Secret Plans" inside it. Before he can read it, he is ambushed by a wampa. When the TaunTaun comes to, he finds himself inside the holding cell of AT-AT and overhears a message to Darth Vader regarding the plans. The TaunTaun secretly takes back the model and prepares to leave when Luke Skywalker appears from under the AT-AT's floor, rescuing the TaunTaun just as he destroys it. They are then greeted by Boba Fett, who wants the map for himself. Skywalker mounts the TaunTaun and flees. After trekking across the frozen wasteland, the TaunTaun collapses along with Skywalker. Skywalker receives a message from Obi-Wan Kenobi's Force ghost, who interrupted by a crack in the ice that reveals a submerged star destroyer. Skywalker recalls a legend involving his father and the star destroyer, before he is shot down into the sarlacc pit. Skywalker then wakes up, revealing the segment was a dream. As he wonders what induced it, Han Solo instructs him to get back inside his dead tauntaun's body. A mashup of the Rayman franchise and Everybody Loves Raymond; After rescuing Betilla the Fairy from Mr. Dark, Rayman invites his parents to stay at his house while their house is fumigated for Raving Rabbids, much to Betilla's chagrin. During breakfast, they berate the meal she has fixed despite the fact that it was magically created from nothing. Betilla forces Rayman to ask his parents to leave, and ultimately flies away when they make him feel guilty for asking. Rayman is then met by Globoxm who brought over some of their parents' stuff, which turns out to be more Rabbids. Rayman then beats up the Rabbids for stealing his franchise from underneath him and wrecking his house. Other sketches: MAD News, Labra-door, Koopa Soup, Water Cooler Talk!, Ask the Celebrity, Employees Must Wash Hands Before Work, Sick Buttowski, Giant Monsters Eat a City, Lightbulb Gets and loses an Idea, Spy vs. Spy, Garfield No Monday Calendar, and It's a Bird!
50	24	"Potions 11 / Moves Like Jabba"	Kevin Shinick, Kirill Baru, Aaron Blitzstein, Steve Borst, Mike Fasolo, Jacob Fleisher, Marly Halpern-Graser, Greg White and Eric Zimmerman	April 9, 2012	1.92
A mashup of Harry Potter and the Deathly Hallows – Part 1 and Ocean's Eleven; Harry Potter tells Ron and Hermione that their franchise is finished, meaning that there will be no fictional wizards in mainstream pop culture for the first time in ten years. Fortunately, Potter knows that Professor Dumbledore owns a special wand that can grant them immortality, hidden in a vault at the Exmagicor Hotel and Casino. He then assembles a team composed of himself, his friends, and various other magicians and wizards to infiltrate the casino and steal the wand. Once inside, the wizards are met with varying obstacles. Each wizard ends up leaving the group but Ron, Hermione, and Harry. When they reach the ninth floor, the trio are greeted by Dumbledore, who informs them that the wand is actually a simple remote control. With it, their franchise will live on forever in reruns, and so will the other wizards who accompanied them. This causes Gandalf, who was crushed by a statue during the heist, to come back to life as Gandalf the Glitter, a stage performer at the Exmagicor. A musical mashup of Return of the Jedi and "Moves like Jagger"; When a disguised Lando Calrissian goes in search of Jabba the Hutt, he runs into a large Gammorean entry guard. Calrissian explains that he is looking for a job and asks the guard how he was hired. The guard decides to tell his story through song, explaining that he has "moves like Jabba". The song ends when the guard is devoured by the Rancor, opening up a position. Calrissian, unfazed, goes in to apply. (Note: Billy Dee Williams reprises his role as Lando Calrissian.) Other sketches: MAD News, Evil Medieval Doesn't have Correct Change, Attorney with a Booger (three-part sketch), Elderly and Disabled People Cross the Street, Parent Trainer, MAD Security Cam, Spy vs. Spy, and McSpidee's Guest star: Billy Dee Williams
51	25	"Addition Impossible / New Gill"	Kevin Shinick, Justin Becker, Aaron Blitzstein, Steve Borst, Mike Fasolo, Marly Halpern-Graser and Greg White	April 16, 2012	1.92
A mashup of Ghost Rider and Mission: Impossible – Ghost Protocol; After Benji Dunn breaks Ethan Hunt out of a Russian prison, Hunt gather a team, including Ghost Rider, to stop nuclear strategist Kurt Hendricks from selling nuclear launch codes. Hendricks is expected to meet the buyer on the top floor of the tallest building in the city. The team's mission is to infiltrate Hendricks before the exchange is made. The first attempt to stop Hendricks fails due to Hunt's slow thinking, causing a change of plan that involves Hunt going undercover as the buyer. Seeing that Hunt is alone causes Hendricks to panic until Ghost Rider shows up, disguised as the buyer's assistant. Hendricks sees through the disguise as Ghost Rider's flames are clearly visible, and he soon flees. Hunt chases Hendricks into the parking garage, where Hunt meets Lightning McQueen. Hunt takes McQueen and drives into Hendricks, taking the launch codes back at the expense of McQueen, who is left badly injured and on fire. Ghost Rider's bike insures McQueen that's he'll get used to it. A mashup of The Little Mermaid and New Girl; When Ariel is dumped by Prince Eric (who goes on to marry Ursula) after being annoyed by her constant singing, she moves in with three guys who, like Prince Eric, find her tendencies really annoying. To curtail this, they try help her find a new boyfriend. They first pair her with Marlin, but he has too many family issues. Next, they have her date SpongeBob SquarePants, but she finds out he is far too chipper and eccentric for her. Ariel finally goes on a date with Aquaman and finds that they have everything in common, but before she can do anything about it, he is caught by the cast of Deadliest Catch. Seeing that she will never find happiness, Ariel begins to sing again, much to the annoyance of her roommates, who begin using hamburgers as earplugs when Scuttle states that he heard that they are great for blocking sound. Other sketches: MAD News, Women Saves Herself from a Train, Satel-Night-Light, Superheroes: They're Just Like Us, LIFE: the Ride, My Little PWNY, Babies Are Monsters... But Nobody Notices, Spy vs. Spy, Professor X Boards His Plane, and Bad Idea
52	26	"iChronicle / Hulk Smash"	Kevin Shinick, Kirill Baru, Justin Becker, Aaron Blitzstein, Steve Borst, Jacob Fleisher, Marly Halpern-Graser, Greg White and Eric Zimmerman	April 23, 2012	1.63
A mashup of iCarly and Chronicle; While filming an episode of iCarly, Spencer takes the gang to a hole where they find a crystal that gives Sam and Freddie superpowers. Carly insists that she too was granted superpowers as well as improved acting skills, but Sam and Freddie are not convinced. Carly sets out to prove it by reporting the weather on a public access channel. Convinced that Carly's acting has improved, Sam suggests that she shouldn't be held down by public access. This prompts Carly to try to place an antenna at the top of the Space Needle. Sam and Freddie try to reason with Carly, but she refuses since she is tired of being made fun of. Sam and Freddie attack Carly, and Sam defeats Carly by dropping a Nickelodeon blimp on her. However, at the wreckage below, Carly is shown alive and well, stating that this was proof of her acting ability. A mashup of Hulk and Smash; After the Hulk auditions for the Avengers, he reverts to Bruce Banner. Not remembering what Hulk did, Banner makes the best of this and decides to apply to the Avengers in the hopes that they might need another scientist. Iron Man considers Banner based on his inexperience, and is left with the problem of choosing which identity to make the official member. Seeing this a problem, both personae begin to sing a Broadway-style duet explaining how they feel in regards to the decision. Eventually, Iron Man decides to let the Hulk in anyway after he discovers that the Hulk and Banner are one and the same. He also informs them the bad news: Banner and Hulk both paid to see John Carter. Other sketches: MAD News, "Superman is Awesome!" Monument, Miley Storage, Couple Packs Up at the Beach, Extinction: It Could Happen at Any Time, Extremely Far and Incredibly Blurry, Bike Airbag, Spy vs. Spy, CM Punk Beds, and Computer Crash

=== Season 3 (2012–13) ===
No. overall	No. in season	Title	Written by	Original release date	US viewers (millions)
53	1	"The Iron Giant Lady / Raising a New Hope"	Kevin Shinick, Justin Becker, Aaron Blitzstein, Mickey Bloom, Steve Borst, Marly Halpern-Graser, Julia Prescott and Greg White	May 28, 2012	1.45
A mashup of The Iron Lady and The Iron Giant; On her road to becoming Britain's prime minister, Margaret Thatcher encounters several problems, such as the fact that she's a six-story robot with a loud voice and limited vocabulary. She decides to take elocution lessons to this end, and eventually learns to speak well enough so she wins the election. Under Thatcher's administration, she manages to literally squash the debt ceiling, make an impact on education, and returned England's currency to the rock standard. Her actions have also inspired other gynoids throughout the world to seek positions of power. It is then revealed that Thatcher has been telling her story to the audience of the Robot Grammys, whose nominees are all various gynoid versions of Adele. A mashup of A New Hope and Raising Hope; After Anakin Skywalker is defeated on Mustafar, Obi-Wan Kenobi sends Anakin's newborn son Luke to live with his uncle Owen Lars. Luke proves to be too much of a handful for the humble farmer, so Owen decides to send him off to live with the Tusken Raiders. Other sketches: MADvent Calendar, Genie Lamp Used on Noisy Wanderer, the Visibility Cloak, MAD News, Alien Father Uses his Fart Gun, Audience Frenzy, Nessie, Super Duper Cutz Grand Opening, Spy vs. Spy, Parallel Lumberjack Crushing, Edna the Kangaroo Forgot her Pouch, and Horse and Cowboy Enter Saloon
54	2	"Yawn Carter / Franklin & Crash"	Kevin Shinick, Justin Becker, Aaron Blitzstein, Steve Borst, Marly Halpern-Graser and Ben Joseph	June 4, 2012	1.99
A parody of John Carter; After receiving a device from Abin Sur, miner John Carter is teleported to Mars. It's there that he meets Marvin the Martian, who dubs him "Yawn Carter" for his boring and longwinded backstory. Marvin asks Carter for his help to fight his peoples' civil war, but Carter is reluctant since he would rather search for gold. Marvin's dog K-9 grabs Carter and takes him to the Martians' village. Seeing that he has survived the trip, it is declared that Carter has superhuman abilities that can be useful in the war. While there, Carter is greeted by princess Dejah Thoris, who informs him that she has been betrothed to J'onn J'onzz, who she does not love. J'onzz has Carter arrested for fraternizing with Thoris, and he is sentenced to a fight to the death with the ravenous Bruno Mars. Carter manages to kill Mars, escape the arena, and crash Thoris' wedding. As Carter declares his feelings for Thoris and gives her a diamond ring, Thoris promptly teleports Carter back to Earth, revealing that Carter's entire adventure was just an elaborate plan for Thoris to get an engagement ring. A mashup of Franklin & Bash and Crash Bandicoot; Jared Franklin is paired with Crash Bandicoot, and together, the two must defend the Prince of the Cosmos in court, as he has been accused of massive collateral damage by his creation of katamaris. At the trial, prosecutor Sonic the Hedgehog presents compelling video evidence of the Prince's rampant destruction. Finally, the Prince calls upon his father, the King, who explains that his son's activities were to help repopulate the cosmos with new stars, as the King accidentally did away with all the old ones. In the end, the King takes the courthouse and hurls it into space, turning it into the final star for an Alfred E. Neuman constellation. Other sketches: MADvent Calendar, Burglar Disguised as a Raccoon, Sports Drink Drink, RPG Nerd Has to Get a Life, Alfred E. Neuman for President Celebrity Endorsement, the Woman in Back, Spy vs. Spy, and Toughest Miniature Golf Hole
55	3	"Battleship vs. Titanic / Jurassic Parks and Recreation"	Kevin Shinick, Justin Becker, Aaron Blitzstein, Steve Borst, Marly Halpern-Graser, Ben Joseph and Greg White	June 11, 2012	2.35
A mashup of Battleship and Titanic; Thanks to 3-D technology, the RMS Titanic is able to avoid the iceberg that sinks it, only for it to encounter a hostile alien battleship. Rose and Jack are greeted by Admiral Shane, who briefs them on the threat and attempts to prepare for battle. Since the Titanic is a cruise ship and therefore unfit for battle, they decide to use the women and children as ammunition by catapulting them at the alien ship, but their firing range is too short. Jack then decides to draw sketches of everybody, allowing the aliens to take over the rear half of the ship. Shane decides to activate the ship's emergency separation mechanism to whoever is left, only to cause the ship's inevitable sinking. As Jack and Rose are left clinging to a piece of wood, Rose states to the wood she will never let go, which knocks Jack aside. Lt. Hopper surfaces, begging to be saved so he can star in John Carter: The Gods of Mars. In the present, an elderly Rose recounts the story of how she met her alien husband to their hybrid children. A mashup of Jurassic Park and Parks and Recreation; Leslie Knope unveils Pawnee Park's newest project, which is to include a new dinosaur-themed zoological park to compete with rival Eagleton, who received the dinosaurs from Terra Nova. However, when Andy decides to save money by not putting locks on the cages, the dinosaurs run amok over the park. With most of the staff devoured by the carnivores, Leslie hold a meeting to address the issue, only for the meeting to be crashed by a velociraptor, that sets its sights on Knope. Before it can attack, the raptor is devoured by a Tyrannosaurus, which is carrying Ron Swanson on its back. Other sketches: MADvent Calendar, Bad Idea, Swisster, Cool Bus, Alfred E. Neuman Presidential Campaign Ad, Fat Man Buys a Magic Carpet, Sheriff RoboBobaLobo, Spy vs. Spy, "Hey, whatever happened to that guy from that TV show I kinda remember from when I was a kid"?, and Literal Food Fight
56	4	"Betty White & the Huntsman / Ancient Greek MythBusters"	Kevin Shinick, Justin Becker, Aaron Blitzstein, Steve Borst, Marly Halpern-Graser, Ben Joseph and Greg White	June 18, 2012	1.94
A parody of Snow White & the Huntsman; Queen Ravenna is shocked when her magic mirror informs her that Betty White is fairer than she is, and orders Eric the Huntsman to retrieve her heart. Eric goes to Betty's office, but chooses not to kill her since he enjoys Hot in Cleveland. Instead, he decides to train her to fight the Queen in battle. When they return to face Ravenna, they are greeted by Queen Clementianna from Mirror Mirror. Betty White laments over the idea of two Snow White films being released in the same year and regards the 1937 Disney film as the superior adaptation, having taken her grandchildren to see it. A parody of MythBusters; On their last episode, Jamie Hyneman and Adam Savage managed to prove that time travel exists, but have now found themselves trapped in Ancient Greece, rather than try to get back home, they decide to do a special episode dedicated to busting Ancient Greek mythology. Their experiments create disastrous results, ultimately resulting in the Titans being freed. Fortunately, Grant appears in a time machine to take the duo home. However, Perseus, furious at the duo for wrecking his home, takes the time machine and heads to the year 2015 where he lives it up hoverboarding until he is hit by a hovercar. Other sketches: MADvent Calendar, Crocodile wins Animal Actor Award, Awake 'n Shake, Employees Must Wash Hands and Feet Before Returning to Work, R2-PO, Alfred E. Neuman Presidential Campaign Ad, 20/80, Spy vs. Spy, and Man Falls Down from the Ceiling
57	5	"I Am Lorax / Modern Family Circus"	Kevin Shinick, Justin Becker, Aaron Blitzstein, Steve Borst, Marly Halpern-Graser, Ben Joseph, Seth Medej, Johnny Ryan and Greg White	June 25, 2012	1.78
A mashup of The Lorax and I Am Legend; Upon learning that the state of his hometown of Thneed-Ville is really a rundown, zombie-infested wasteland, Ted Wiggins seeks help of the Willsler to find a permanent solution, as well as a tree to impress local girl Audrey. The Willsler explains that he was forewarned of the dangers of messing with nature by the Lorax and two other incarnations of Danny DeVito. Just then, the zombified Lorax and several forest animals appear to attack both the Willsler and Wiggins. However, Wiggins comes to the realization that since the story is animated, everything can simply be drawn back to normal. This prompts a large artist's hand to appear and redraw the world and restore everyone in it. When Wiggins claims he still needs a tree, the Willsler simply gives him his daughter Willow. A mashup of Modern Family and The Family Circus; The Prichett/Dunphy family decide to pay the Keane family a visit. Things start out fine, until Bil pulls Jay aside to warn him of the danger of their son, Jeffy, who has been forcing the rest of the family to repeat the same jokes for over four decades for his own amusement. Unfortunately, Jeffy has been listening the whole time, and not only punishes the rest of his family for their failed escape, but he also traps the Prichett/Dunphy family inside the funnies. Other sketches: MADvent Calendar, Darth Maul's Sporksaber, Flunco! Products, Alfred E. Neuman for President Ad, Alien Shark Week, Fart or Chair, Mimes.: They Think They Know Everything, Spy vs. Spy, Devil is Banished After Hearing Good Manners, and That's How Science Works!
58	6	"This Means War Machine / iCharlie"	Kevin Shinick, Justin Becker, Aaron Blitzstein, Steve Borst, Marly Halpern-Graser, Ben Joseph, Chris Regan and Greg White	July 23, 2012	1.92
A mashup of Iron Man and This Means War; Iron Man and War Machine realize they're both dating Pepper Potts, so they keep sabotaging the others' dates to gain Pepper's affection. A mashup of Peanuts and iCarly; Lucy Van Pelt posts a video of the old routine where Charlie Brown fails to kick the football, which promptly goes viral. Charlie finds that one of the comments is from the Little Red-Haired Girl, who calls him cute. Smitten by her comment, Charlie continues getting himself into dangerous stunts on the internet, his hits continuing to rise exponentially. However, during a live show, Charlie goes off the rails and berates the crew, which ultimately ruins his popularity. The Little Red-Haired Girl leaves another comment on this latest video, calling Charlie a blockhead. Other sketches: MADvent Calendar, Door Monster, Oompa Loompa & Golden, Horses: Swiping Kids Since 1873, James Bond's Latest Mission, Two Guys on a Railroad Car, Rejected Playground Equipment, Cheaters Week on The Price Is Right, Spy vs. Spy, Alfred E. Neuman for President Celebrity Endorsement, and Astronaut Graduation
59	7	"The Mixed Martial Artist / Aquaman vs. Wild"	Kevin Shinick, Justin Becker, Aaron Blitzstein, Steve Borst, Marly Halpern-Graser and Chris Regan	July 30, 2012	1.65
A parody of The Artist; In a silent, black-and-white segment, a silent film star is kicked to the curb to make way for America's new favorite form of entertainment: mixed martial arts. The actor tries to train himself in the ways of combat, but finds that he is woefully unprepared. A mashup of Aquaman and Man vs. Wild; When Bear Grylls is poisoned by a nightshade toad killing him, Aquaman is brought in to host the latest episode of Man vs. Wild in his place. He soon finds himself the desert, where he can't find any fish to eat or a large body of water. When he finally reaches the ocean, he encounters a man who needs his help fighting the aliens from Battleship, prompting Aquaman to return to the desert. Other sketches: MADvent Calendar, Robots Disguised as a Scientist, Hobbittrails, Alfred E. Neuman for President: Rejected Mascots, ICAF-14, King Tuttowski, Spy vs. Spy, Unfinished Sky Write, and Taking the Dough
60	8	"The Blunder Games / The Poop-seidon Adventure"	Kevin Shinick, Justin Becker, Aaron Blitzstein, Steve Borst; Marly Halpern-Graser, Ben Joseph, Heather Maidat and Mason Steinberg	August 6, 2012	1.90
A parody of The Hunger Games; The tributes from District 12 battle the tributes from other franchises, including District Hogwarts and District Twilight. A parody of The Poseidon Adventure; In the oldest parody of the series, a famous ship is capsized by a tidal wave, leaving a handful of survivors to try and escape alive. Other sketches: MADvent Calendar, Fisherman Can't Hurt a Talking Fish, Devil Makes Deviled Eggs, Sea-Gorillas, Lassie pushes Ruth Martin down a well, Answers to Your Homework, Egyptians Build Food Pyramid, Alfred E. Neuman for President: Campaign Promises, The Quick Way Out, What to Expect When You're Expecto Patronum, Spy vs. Spy, and Left Field confuses team strategy
61	9	"The Average-ers / The Legend of Dora"	Kevin Shinick, Justin Becker, Aaron Blitzstein, Steve Borst, Mike Fasolo, Marly Halpern-Graser and Chris Regan	September 13, 2012	1.23
A parody of The Avengers; Nick Fury needs to organize a group of superheroes who don't have their own movies to make to save the world. However, the gathered heroes find themselves dealing with Loki, the Chitauri, and a disgruntled Hulk, who is angered at his lack of airtime. (Note: Hulk later barges into other sketches.) A mashup of Dora the Explorer and The Legend of Korra; Dora is revealed to be the newest Avatar, so she is trained in the ways of airbending in time for a tournament. Hulk crashes the sketch for additional airtime, helping Dora win in the process. Other sketches: MADvent Calendar, Bank Robin, Tasmanian Devil Duster, Lizard gets a new tail for his birthday, Alfred E. Neuman for President: Rejected Campaign Slogans, Crash Cab, Everything is Better with Ninjas!, Spy vs. Spy, and the Perfect Solution for Dry Skin Note: Tasmanian Devil Duster, Animated Marginals, and Legend of Dora were interrupted by Hulk.
62	10	"Men in Black to the Future / Pokémon of Interest"	Kevin Shinick, Matt Beans, Justin Becker, Aaron Blitzstein, Steve Borst, Marly Halpern-Graser, Ben Joseph, Chris Regan and Amber Tozer	September 20, 2012	1.32
A mashup of Men in Black 3 and Back to the Future; Agent J bounces through time looking for his partner, Agent K. His trip through time often has him being taken to different movies Tommy Lee Jones was in. A mashup of Pokémon and Person of Interest; John Reese uses his Special Forces skills to track down a Psyduck. Other sketches: MADvent Calendar, Follow Your Nose, CelebMD, Alarm Clock's Revenge, ADrake, a MAD Misunderstanding - A Night by the Fire, Alfred E. Neuman for President Suggested Running Mates, Squid Hates Surprise Parties, Superman's Curl, Spy vs. Spy, and Dinner Time for the Bears
63	11	"Diary of a Wimpy Kid Icarus / The Adjustment Burro"	Kevin Shinick, Kirill Baru, Matt Beans, Justin Becker, Aaron Blitzstein, Steve Borst, Jacob Fleisher, Marly Halpern-Graser, Ben Joseph, Chris Regan, Amber Tozer, Greg White and Eric Zimmerman	September 27, 2012	1.51
A mashup of Kid Icarus and Diary of a Wimpy Kid; Pit, the hero of Kid Icarus, gets picked on by the more popular video game characters in school as he tries to win their respect, along with his BFF, Kirby. A trailer mashup of The Many Adventures of Winnie the Pooh, My Little Pony: Friendship Is Magic, and The Adjustment Bureau; One day, Eeyore meets Twilight Sparkle (reprised by Tara Strong) and falls in love with her, becoming truly happy for the very first time. He is soon kidnapped by a trio of donkeys who tell him that everything in his life has been planned out for him, and he needs to stick with that plan no matter what. Eeyore and Twilight promptly go on the run to try and escape the donkeys' grand design. Other sketches: MADvent Calendar, Paper Cut, Rental Floss, Cavemen: Gosh, They Were Dumb, Concise Age, Alfred E. Neuman for President: Hide and Seek, Never Trust a Tree, Spy vs. Spy, Father & Son Ninjas, Downsides of Being a Fairytale Princess, Batmobile Crashes Into Batcave, and Lab Rats
64	12	"Taking Nemo / Once Upon a Toon"	Kevin Shinick, Matt Beans, Justin Becker, Aaron Blitzstein, Steve Borst, Marly Halpern-Graser, Ben Joseph, Chris Regan and Amber Tozer	October 4, 2012	1.42
A mashup of Finding Nemo and Taken; When Nemo is kidnapped, Marlin calls up Liam Neeson to save him. To get clues on Nemo's whereabouts, mainly via beating up anyone in his way, Neeson proceeds with harass Bruce and the sharks, Ariel and Flounder, and SpongeBob SquarePants before he's captured by John Lasseter, who is revealed to have kidnapped Nemo so he could turn him into 3D and make a profit from him. Though he intends to stop the director's diabolical plan, Neeson is bought with a 3D movie deal. A mashup of Once Upon a Time and the series of Cartoon Network, made exclusively for the network's 20th birthday; The residents of a seaside town are actually characters from shows of Cartoon Network's past that were transported to the "real world" by an evil force. Henry Swan gathers Johnny Bravo, Dexter, Samurai Jack, Cow and Chicken, and numerous others to stand up to the evil while tearing down the fourth wall. They soon discover that Dee Dee is the mastermind behind the evil, and is cancelling their shows so Cartoon Network can have new shows like MAD. The segment turns out to be a nightmare experienced by Johnny Bravo, until he notices Alfred E. Neuman, dressed as Elvis Presley, sitting in a chair next to him. Other sketches: MADvent Calendar, Caveman Invents Fire (and bragging), Dark Knight Bread Riser, Extinction: It Could Happen at Any Time, the Adventures of Iron Man, Knight at the Airport, Spy vs. Spy, Alfred E. Neuman for President: Alfred E. Neuman Was There, and Fish Staring Contest
65	13	"Outtagascar / F·I·E·N·D·S"	Kevin Shinick, Matt Beans, Justin Becker, Aaron Blitzstein, Steve Borst, Marly Halpern-Graser, Chris Regan and Amber Tozer	October 11, 2012	1.66
A mashup of Madagascar 3: Europe's Most Wanted; The cast of Madagascar wind up on a train filled with animated film characters whose franchises are clearly out of gas. They work together to put on a circus to show the world how cool they truly are, but they accidentally burn the circus down and are sent to prison until 2047. A parody of Friends; Six villains (Baroness, Mystique, Lord Voldemort, Maleficent, Dr. Victor von Doom, and Megatron) try to make their way in New York City. Other sketches: MADvent Calendar, Ball Returner has a Pitching Machine's Motor, Deltoids, Flies Take Over the World, Body of Pwoof, Spy vs. Spy, and Where's the Fire?
66	14	"The Amazing Spider-Minaj / Go, Dragon Ball, Go!"	Kevin Shinick, Matt Beans, Justin Becker, Aaron Blitzstein, Steve Borst, Marly Halpern-Graser, Ben Joseph and Amber Tozer	October 18, 2012	1.50
A parody of The Amazing Spider-Man; Peter Parker learns that he's not the only web head in town, as Nicki Minaj has taken it upon herself to become a fellow spider-person. A mashup of Go, Diego, Go! and Dragon Ball; Diego searches for the seven Dragon Balls to have his wish granted, a wish where he can save every animal that ever lived. Other sketches: MADvent Calendar, Old Lady Crosses the Street, Pikmin Pest B Gone, University of Walking, Alfred E. Neuman for President: News from the Campaign Trail, Meme Wolf, Spy vs. Spy, Things That Would Be Better if They Bounced, and Alpha Man
67	15	"FrankenWinnie / ParaMorgan"	Kevin Shinick, Justin Becker, Aaron Blitzstein, Marly Halpern-Graser and Amber Tozer	October 25, 2012	1.58
A halloween mashup of Winnie the Pooh and the Honey Tree and Frankenweenie; When Winnie the Pooh is torn apart, Christopher Robin is determined to bring him back to life. However, when Pooh wakes up, he goes on a rampage thanks to having a jar of honey for a brain instead of the brain of A. A. Milne. Christopher Robin eventually calms him down by giving him his pants, which Piglet thought he needed. A halloween parody of ParaNorman; Norman Babcock, already able to see ghosts, starts hearing the voice of Morgan Freeman. He teams up with all sorts of ghosts to stop Freeman and other celebrities from taking over voice-over jobs, due to Johnny Blaze telling him about what was happening. Other sketches: MADvent Calendar, Zombies Try to Eat the Scarecrow's Brain, the Grim Sleeper, Bane: Friend of Children, Enemy to Bats, the Legend of Snoopy Hollow, Avengers' Halloween Party, Spy vs. Spy, and a Nightmare brought to you by MAD Guest star: Rico Rodriguez
68	16	"Dark Knight at the Museum / Lemming Snicket's A Series of Unfortunate Video Game Deaths"	Kevin Shinick, Matt Beans, Justin Becker, Aaron Blitzstein, Steve Borst, Marly Halpern-Graser, Zack Kahn and Chris Regan	November 1, 2012	1.62
A mashup of Batman and Night at the Museum; Batman investigates the Museum of Television, only to discover that the exhibits come to life at night. He is then forced to team up with the living exhibits to stop the Riddler. A mashup of Lemmings and Lemony Snicket's A Series of Unfortunate Events; Three orphaned Lemmings go on the run from their evil guardian Wario. They eventually escape, but all sorts of bad things happen to them. Lemming Snicket is then confronted by the trio, and Sunny blows him up. Violet also forces him to write down the ending while the three are on a deserted island. Other sketches: MADvent Calendar, The Next Page of Johnny Appleseed, the Fairly OddParental Controls, Electric Eels Forgot to Pay the Electric Bill, Guy Pearce Gets Punched in the Face, Shirt Cannon 3000 and Shirt Squirt, Alfred E. Neuman for President: More Campaign Promises, Spy vs. Spy, and Every Last Drop of Gas
69	17	"Total Recall Me Baby / The Asgardigans"	Kevin Shinick, Matt Beans, Justin Becker, Aaron Blitzstein, Steve Borst, Marly Halpern-Graser and Amber Tozer	November 8, 2012	1.73
A musical mashup of Total Recall and "Call Me Maybe"; Jessica Biel explains the plot of Total Recall to the audience through song, all while reminding them how bad the film is. A mashup of Thor and The Backyardigans; Thor teams up with the Backyardigans in order to hunt down Loki. The quintet teach him the power of imagination along the way, which he uses to defeat his brother. In his mind, at least. Other sketches: MADvent Calendar, Dumb Dog Dream, MAD News (2-part skit), Wonder Woman Bread, Trick Acorn, Who Wore it Better?, Terry Covington, M.D., Spy vs. Spy, and Banana Slip
70	18	"The Bourne Leg-a-Turkey / PilGrimm"	Kevin Shinick, Matt Beans, Justin Becker, Aaron Blitzstein, Steve Borst, Marly Halpern-Graser, Matt Lawton and Amber Tozer	November 15, 2012	1.45
A parody of The Bourne Legacy; Aaron Giblet, a turkey secret agent, is on the run from the people who created him. A parody of Grimm; Nick Burkhardt and Hank Griffin hunt down the terrifying creature known as the Turducken. Other sketches: MADvent Calendar, History: It's All Hazy Anyway!, Leaf Pile Eats Girl, Jokahontas Live! (two-part sketch), Bad Idea, How to Draw a Turkey, Bartholomew's Buckle Barn, Festive Ways to Improve Thanksgiving, and Spy vs. Spy
71	19	"Here Comes the Doom / Brain Purge"	Kevin Shinick, Matt Beans, Justin Becker, Aaron Blitzstein, Steve Borst, Marly Halpern-Graser, Ben Joseph and Amber Tozer	November 29, 2012	1.03
A mashup of Doctor Doom and Here Comes the Boom; In a sequel to "VICTORious", Victor von Doom turns to MMA fighting to raise money for Hollywood Arts High School, so he can get the budget raised to win the art contest. Doom loses the match, but he wins 1,000 more dollars than the winner for some odd reason. A mashup of Men in Black 3 and BrainSurge; Agent J takes over as the host of Brain Surge, and repeatedly neuralizes everyone to forget everything they know, including the viewers watching the episode. Other sketches: MADvent Calendar, Pied Piper's Wrong Pipe, Koopa Troopa, Gutsman, & Kracko, ThunderCat Barbershop Quartet, MAD Ask the Celebrity, Tom and Jury, Spy vs. Spy, and Bad Idea
72	20	"Fantastic Four Christmases / Red & White Collar"	Kevin Shinick, Justin Becker, Aaron Blitzstein, Susan Clarke, Marly Halpern-Graser, Heather Maidat and Mason Steinberg	December 6, 2012	0.98
A mashup of Fantastic Four and Four Christmases; The Fantastic Four try to stop fighting villains and enjoy Christmas together, but such a task is highly demanding. A parody of White Collar; Santa Claus teams up with the FBI to solve a case of breaking and entering, but his method of only using the chimney does little to solve the crime, which turns out to have been committed by his own elves. Other sketches: MADvent Calendar, Frosty's North Pole Diet, This Christmas Eve, Think Before You Choose, Scroog'd, Spy vs. Spy, and Frosty the Snowman Steals Hat and Mom's Car
73	21	"Hip Hop Hobbit / The Monday Project"	Kevin Shinick, Justin Becker, Aaron Blitzstein, Marly Halpern-Graser and Amber Tozer	January 21, 2013	1.64
A musical parody of The Hobbit: An Unexpected Journey; Bilbo Baggins embarks on an old-school quest of rhyming and break dancing to vanquish Smaug. A mashup of Garfield and Friends and The Mindy Project; When Odie's original owner Lyman is declared legally dead and the dog inherits a billion dollars, Garfield can't stop himself from kicking him. To this end, the fat cat vows to get his life together and tries to stop rampaging so much. Other sketches: MADvent Calendar, Is Santa Coming or Not?, Why Kristen Stewart Never Laughs... or Smiles, MAD Security Cam, the Perks of Being a Cauliflower, Spy vs. Spy, Tinky Turner's Self Elf Book, and Ant Funeral Guest star: Biz Markie
74	22	"The Perks of Being a Wallcrawler / Regular Shogun Warriors"	Kevin Shinick, Matt Beans, Justin Becker, Aaron Blitzstein, Marly Halpern-Graser, Chris Regan and Amber Tozer	January 28, 2013	1.80
A mashup of Spider-Man and The Perks of Being a Wallflower; Spider-Man teaches a shy high school student how to be popular through his own brand of heroism, so he can impress the manic popular kids. A mashup of Shogun Warriors and Regular Show; Without the threat of Godzilla, the Shogun Warriors spend the day like any other regular day, playing video games and avoiding their boss. Other sketches: MADvent Calendar, Dragon Visits the Doctor, Pirate Pete's Plank Pavilion, Baby Architect, the Land Before Adventure Time, Tonto's Silver, Other Old Timey Hawkeye Weapons, Spy vs. Spy, and Stupid Sun Always Letting Them Down
75	23	"Twilight: Breaking Down / GOllum ON"	Kevin Shinick, Matt Beans, Justin Becker, Aaron Blitzstein, Marly Halpern-Graser and Amber Tozer	February 4, 2013	1.57
A parody of The Twilight Saga: Breaking Dawn – Part 2; Bella and Edward have one last challenge to overcome before they can live happily ever after: finding a babysitter willing to watch their crazed vampire baby. A mashup of The Lord of the Rings and Go On; Gollum joins a support group to put his life back together and help himself get over the loss of the One Ring. Other sketches: MADvent Calendar, Dragon Breath, Aquapella, MAD Security Cam, Nyefall, Spy vs. Spy, and You're Not Kathy Hernandez
76	24	"Life of Rhyme / Here Comes Yogi Boo Boo"	Kevin Shinick, Justin Becker, Aaron Blitzstein, Steve Borst, Marly Halpern-Graser, Matt Lawton and Amber Tozer	February 18, 2013	1.64
A mashup of Life of Pi and The Cat in the Hat; A young boy named Piscine Molitor is shipwrecked after a dangerous storm, trapped on a lifeboat with the Cat in the Hat, whose incessant rhyming and optimism drive him mad. A mashup of The Yogi Bear Show and Here Comes Honey Boo Boo; Yogi has become an overweight slob and Boo-Boo a dim-witted pageant queen, and a camera crew keeps filming their actions since Jersey Shore was cancelled. All the while, Ranger Smith laments over the lack of sophistication in American entertainment. Other sketches: MADvent Calendar, Bluto Gets spinach at a restaurant, Lipstuck, "Did Anybody Get Mom a Card?", Spy vs. Spy, MAD's Guide to Picking Up Girls, and Man on an Island
77	25	"Reply All / Randy Savage: 9th Grade Wrestler"	Kevin Shinick, Matt Beans, Justin Becker, Aaron Blitzstein, Marly Halpern-Graser and Amber Tozer	February 25, 2013	1.91
A parody of Skyfall; When an embarrassing video of Raoul Silva is accidentally sent to all the spies in the world, it's up to James Bond to stop Silva from taking the spies out. A parody of Randy Cunningham: 9th Grade Ninja; 9th grader Randy Cunningham must don the beard of a legendary wrestler from the 1980s to fight the forces of evil. Other sketches: MADvent Calendar, Book Report, Chunky Mouthwash, Scenes We'd Like to See: The Avengers, Sink Hole in Carrot Garden, Dragon Ball TMZ, Lumberjack tries to kill a spider, Spy vs. Spy, and Astrology: It's All Made Up Anyway
78	26	"George Washington: Cherry Tree Chopper / Star Wars Earned Stripes"	Kevin Shinick, Justin Becker, Aaron Blitzstein, Marly Halpern-Graser and Amber Tozer	March 4, 2013	1.69
A parody of Abraham Lincoln: Vampire Hunter; The viewers are shown the completely true story of George Washington's war against the insidious cherry trees. A mashup of Star Wars and Stars Earn Stripes; A group of C-list celebrities are enlisted into the Empire, where they have to prove they have what it takes to become A-list stormtroopers. Other sketches: MADvent Calendar, Never Bring a Swordfish to a Gunfish Fight, Shellmet, Holidays We'd Like to See, Bakin', Spy vs. Spy, and Robin Hood Goes to Jail

=== Season 4 (2013) ===
No. overall	No. in season	Title	Written by	Original release date	US viewers (millions)
79	1	"Linkong / Rainbow Dash & Bernstein"	Kevin Shinick, Matt Beans. Justin Becker, Aaron Blitzstein, Marly Halpern-Graser, Chris Regan and Amber Tozer	April 1, 2013	1.52
A mashup of King Kong and Lincoln; The life of America's greatest president, who was actually a giant ape, is retold to the audience, including his battle against Margaret Thatcher from the previous season's premiere. A mashup of My Little Pony: Friendship Is Magic and Crash & Bernstein; Wyatt Bernstein heads over to Build-a-Buddy to build his new bestie: Rainbow Dash. Though Wyatt wants his buddy to act as a "bro", Rainbow offers to teach him to be a brony instead. Other sketches: MADvent Calendar, Fortune Yeller, Truth Paste, I Never Get a Baby!, Rejected Merry Go Round Characters, Keeping Up with the Carebearshians, Spy vs. Spy, and Ice Diver in Winter Olympics Guest star: Gilbert Gottfried
80	2	"Pokémonsters, Inc. / Bane & Kate"	Kevin Shinick, Justin Becker, Aaron Blitzstein, Steve Borst, Marly Halpern-Graser and Chris Regan	April 8, 2013	1.69
A mashup of Pokémon and Monsters, Inc.; After entering a strange closet, Ash Ketchum ends up in Monstropolis. He quickly begins catching every monster he can, thinking them all to be new types of Pokémon, leaving Mike and Sulley to try stopping him by beating him at his own game. A mashup of Bane and Ben and Kate; Bane sets out to sabotage his sister's date with Bruce Wayne. Other sketches: MADvent Calendar, Bob the Clown Barber, the Gollum Go-Thin Diet, MAD Security Cam, Treasure's Meaningless, Unlimited Breadstick, M&MA Championship, Awkward Moments Never in Danger of Becoming Extinct, Spy vs. Spy, Lean John Silver, and Half a Tooth
81	3	"Wreck It Gandalph / The Big Bird Theory"	Kevin Shinick, Justin Becker, Aaron Blitzstein, Marly Halpern-Graser and Amber Tozer	April 15, 2013	1.78
A mashup of The Hobbit and Wreck-It Ralph; Gandalf the Grey is sick and tired of being a wizard, especially when he hears that he'll be in three brand new Hobbit films. He tries to escape to other movies, but finds himself out of his element. A mashup of Sesame Street and The Big Bang Theory; Leonard Hofstadter and Sheldon Cooper are tired of their show, so they decide to teleport to Sesame Street. There they meet Big Bird, who happens to run the Street with an iron fist. Other sketches: MADvent Calendar, Undercover Wolf at the Shear Delite Salon, Training Car, Other Guardians Ruining Rise of the Guardians, Nickita Minaj, Pinball Goes to Work, Spy vs. Spy, and Wall Scientists
82	4	"Les the Miz / The Lex Factor"	Kevin Shinick, Justin Becker, Aaron Blitzstein, Marly Halpern-Graser, Chris Regan and Amber Tozer	April 22, 2013	1.41
A mashup of Les Misérables and The Miz; In 19th century France, John Cena tries to get back his championship title in this musical parody. A mashup of Lex Luthor and The X Factor; Lex Luthor holds a reality show for villains in order to pick a new candidate he can fight Superman with. Other sketches: MADvent Calendar, Expecting 15-Minute Delays on Playground Slide, Irish Scream Shampoo, MAD Security Cam, the Less You Know, Cop Chef, Spy vs. Spy, Real Life Heroes, and Pillow Fight
83	5	"Papa / 1600 Finn"	Kevin Shinick, Justin Becker, Aaron Blitzstein and Marly Halpern-Graser	May 13, 2013	1.43
A mashup of The Smurfs and Mama; A couple who adopt a pair of young girls soon find themselves terrorized by their former parent: Papa Smurf. A mashup of Adventure Time and 1600 Penn; Finn the Human moves into the White House with his dad, President Dale Gilcrest. Finn's patience and heroism are tested when his father holds a meeting with the Ice King. Other sketches: MADvent Calendar, Spin the Wheel & Win the Cash Before Time Runs Out & Also Maybe Win Prizes!, Snoozeum, Bald Eagle's Wig, What if Mr. Snake Dates his Tail?, the Amazing Man-Spider, MADitorial, Feline Instincts, Spy vs. Spy, and Island in Heaven Guest star: Stan Lee
84	6	"G.I. E.I. Joe / Dog with a Captain's Log"	Kevin Shinick, Justin Becker, Aaron Blitzstein and Marly Halpern-Graser	May 20, 2013	1.51
A parody of G.I. Joe: Retaliation; G.I. Joe recruits General Joe Colton (a.k.a. Old MacDonald) and his farm animals to fight off Cobra. A mashup of Star Trek and Dog with a Blog; The USS Enterprise gets a new crew member: Stan the Dog, who quickly takes command of the ship. Other sketches: MADvent Calendar, What Do Trees Want to Be When They Grow Up?, Zombeach, After-work Activities, How Hot is the Sun?, SpongeBorg SquarePants, Great Moments in Redundancy, Spy vs. Spy, Life: It's All About the Presentation, and Couple Sat in Front Of
85	7	""S" Cape from Planet Earth / The X-Mentalist"	Kevin Shinick, Justin Becker, Aaron Blitzstein and Marly Halpern-Graser	May 27, 2013	1.51
A mashup of Superman and Escape from Planet Earth; Scorch Supernova tries to save Superman, who denies that he needs help. It turns out that Lex Luthor had planted a chunk of kryptonite inside Scorch's pocket. Lena also tells the two that she assisted Luthor because he'd tell her how Lost ended. A mashup of X-Men and The Mentalist; The X-Men give up being superheroes and become police officers in order to hunt down Red John, who turns out to be Magneto in disguise. Other sketches: MADvent Calendar, Feeding the Ducks (three-part sketch), Hairgoat, MADitorial, Tube Feud, Sole Survivor Dream, and Spy vs. Spy Deleted scene: Spider-Man apologizes to Eric Cartman for webbing Kenny.
86	8	"POblivion / Umbrellamentary"	Kevin Shinick, Justin Becker, Aaron Blitzstein, Marly Halpern-Graser and Amber Tozer	June 17, 2013	1.46
A mashup of Oblivion and Kung Fu Panda; Jack Harper believes that he is the last man alive, until he encounters Po. A mashup of Elementary and Mary Poppins; When Sherlock Holmes goes missing, Mary Poppins is called in to investigate the mystery, though her chipper attitude and constant singing aren't really much help. Other sketches: MADvent Calendar, Jimmy Was He, That's Why Dogs Shouldn't Drive, MAD News, Gatored Community, Angelina Jolie Hairstyle, Another Reason Dogs Shouldn't Drive, Middle-aged Wolf, MADitorial, Just a Reminder That Dogs Shouldn't Drive, Spy vs. Spy, and Cave Fireman
87	9	"Jaws the Great and Powerful / Old Spock's Off Their Spockers"	Kevin Shinick, Justin Becker, Aaron Blitzstein and Marly Halpern-Graser	June 24, 2013	1.85
A mashup of Jaws and Oz the Great and Powerful; When a bunch of balloons carry the Orca, and by extension Martin Brody, Matt Hooper, Quint, and a ferocious shark to the Land of Oz, the trio and shark are tasked with following the Yellow Brick Road and defeating the Wicked Witch of the West. A mashup of Star Trek and Betty White's Off Their Rockers; Old Spock spends his free time pranking his younger self and the Enterprise crew. Other sketches: MADvent Calendar, Golf! If Only It Were Like That, the Everyone's Pole: the Firefighter's Pole for Everyone, Ostriches at Work, MADitorial, Psyduck, Running Shoe Test for 50 Years, Spy vs. Spy, and Owls: Don't Be Fooled by their Wisdom
88	10	"Jacks the Giant Slayers / The Most Beautiful Voice"	Kevin Shinick, Justin Becker, Aaron Blitzstein and Marly Halpern-Graser	July 1, 2013	1.98
A parody of Jack the Giant Slayer; When the famous Jack gets crushed by giants, the kingdom has to call in other Jacks from various franchises to exterminate the giants. A mashup of The Little Mermaid and The Voice; Prince Eric and Carson Daly hold a singing competition so the prince can learn the identity of his true love. Ursula turns out to have planned everything to drag Carson Daly to the sea, to the audience's delight. Other sketches: MADvent Calendar, A Jury of Fears, Crate & Arrow, Know the Difference, Gandalf the Grey's Anatomy, Walkie-Talkie in a Toy Boat, Spy vs. Spy, and Dog vs. Man
89	11	"The Great Batsby / Big Time Gold Rush"	Kevin Shinick, Justin Becker, Aaron Blitzstein and Marly Halpern-Graser	July 29, 2013	1.24
A mashup of Batman and The Great Gatsby; A young man named Nick talks about his time with Batman in the 1920s. A mashup of Big Time Rush and Gold Rush; Kendall, James, Carlos, and Logan are sent out to mine for gold in Alaska. Other sketches: MADvent Calendar, Butter Hose, Bungee Bunk, Anime Character or Christina Ricci, Out the Window News (two-part sketch), the Fresh Beasts Band, the Sacred Hammer, Spy vs. Spy, and Money Diapers
90	12	"First White House Down / McDuck Dynasty"	Kevin Shinick, Justin Becker, Aaron Blitzstein and Marly Halpern-Graser	August 5, 2013	2.13
A parody of White House Down; In a sequel to "George Washington: Cherry Tree Chopper", George Washington once again picks up his axe to fight the dreaded cherry trees. A mashup of DuckTales and Duck Dynasty; Scrooge McDuck tries to get Huey, Dewey, and Louie to become part of his duck call business. Other sketches: MADvent Calendar, the Rockets!, Automobile Correct, Awkward Moments, MAD's Guide to the Royal Family, Alyson Gator: Girl Crocodile, Reality TV: Ruining Our Judicial System, Spy vs. Spy, and How to Tie Your Shoes
91	13	"After Bert / Downton Shaggy"	Kevin Shinick, Matt Beans, Justin Becker, Aaron Blitzstein and Marly Halpern-Graser	August 12, 2013	1.57
A mashup of Sesame Street and After Earth; Will Smith crash lands on a planet filled with Muppets, and has to work together with Bert and Ernie to get back to Earth. A mashup of Scooby-Doo, Where Are You! and Downton Abbey; Downton Abbey loses another footman, and his replacement is none other than Shaggy Rogers. Shaggy struggles to adapt to high society as Mystery Incorporated continues solving a mystery around the manor. Other sketches: MADvent Calendar, Ice Cream Truck (two-part sketch), the Gargamelt Sandwich, What Not to Werewolf, Test Your Strength!, and Spy vs. Spy
92	14	"Lone Rango / Doctor Who's Line is it Anyway?"	Kevin Shinick, Justin Becker, Aaron Blitzstein and Marly Halpern-Graser	September 2, 2013	1.62
A mashup of The Lone Ranger and Rango; The Lone Ranger hires Rango the chameleon to be his sidekick to track down Butch, since Tonto is too annoying. A mashup of Doctor Who and Whose Line Is It Anyway?; The Daleks force the Tenth and Eleventh Doctors to a stage so they can compete in improv games against Wayne Brady. Other sketches: MADvent Calendar, Johnny Briefcase, the Invisibility Shop, What If They Had Cell Phones?: Movie Edition, Boomerang Bouquet, Deadliest Catchy Tune, Spy vs. Spy, and Quilty as Charged
93	15	"Iron Bland 3 / Monsters Community"	Kevin Shinick, Justin Becker, Aaron Blitzstein and Marly Halpern-Graser	September 9, 2013	1.31
A parody of Iron Man 3; Iron Man battles the Mandarin without trying to call the Avengers. A mashup of Monsters University and Community; Mike and Sulley are going back to college. Specifically, Greendale Community College. Other sketches: MADvent Calendar, Sparkler System, the Disposable Car, Old Gift Certificate to the Video Game Store, Crash, Spy vs. Spy, and the Less You Know
94	16	"Star Blecch Into Dumbness / Stark Tank"	Kevin Shinick, Justin Becker, Aaron Blitzstein and Marly Halpern-Graser	September 16, 2013	1.37
A parody of Star Trek Into Darkness; The crew of the Enterprise stupidly go where many other movies have gone before. A mashup of Iron Man and Shark Tank; Iron Man and other wealthy superheroes offer to fund the endeavors of others, if the pitch is right. Other sketches: MADvent Calendar, You Fell Asleep While Skiing, Can You Guess What Just Broke?, MAD Security Cam, the Water Bunkbed, Happily Ever After Earth, Scarf Snake, Spy vs. Spy, and Golden Parking Ticket
95	17	"The Flash & the Furious / Saved by Adele"	Kevin Shinick, Justin Becker, Aaron Blitzstein and Marly Halpern-Graser	September 23, 2013	1.42
A mashup of The Flash and Fast & Furious 6; The cast of Fast and the Furious gets assistance from the Flash. He may be the fastest man alive, but is he the most furious? A parody of Saved by the Bell; A dated high school sitcom gets singing lessons by Adele. Other sketches: MADvent Calendar, Growing a Bone Tree, Yawn Mower, Octopus Woman Strangling a Castaway, Ask a Wizard with Harry Potter, MacKeral's, 60 Minotaur, Ducks: All They Really Need is Money, Spy vs. Spy, and Penguin Denied Access to the Waddle Room
96	18	"Lukewarm Bodies / Does Someone Have to GOa?"	Kevin Shinick, Justin Becker, Aaron Blitzstein and Marly Halpern-Graser	September 30, 2013	1.19
A parody of Warm Bodies; A lovesick zombie tries to overcome his cravings for brains for his crush, as well as how lazy zombie movies have gotten. A mashup of Green Lantern and Does Someone Have to Go?; The Lantern Corps. are asked which of their teammates should be fired. Other sketches: MADvent Calendar, Fred's Diner, Flop-Flips, Over-Reactor's Hall of Fame, Hands Free Detective, Spy vs. Spy, and Popular Style: the Mohawk, Unpopular Style: the Real Hawk
97	19	"Pacific Ring / Horton Hears a Whodunnit!"	Kevin Shinick, Justin Becker, Aaron Blitzstein and Marly Halpern-Graser	October 7, 2013	0.84
A wrestling-themed parody of Pacific Rim; Giant monsters can only be defeated by one thing: giant robot wrestlers. A mashup of Horton Hears a Who! and Whodunnit?; A group of strangers are asked to solve a murder by Horton the Elephant. Other sketches: MADvent Calendar, Dads: On Top of Things Since 2004, Travelociraptor, Dwarf Mix-Up, Snoring Strips, Little House Down, Nurse of the Year, Spy vs. Spy, and Two Birds with One Stone
98	20	"World War ZZZ / SHAZAM! & Cat"	Kevin Shinick, Justin Becker, Aaron Blitzstein and Marly Halpern-Graser	October 14, 2013	1.26
A parody of World War Z; Brad Pitt must save the world from zombies before everyone falls asleep because the movie is so boring. A mashup of Captain Marvel and Sam & Cat; Sam Puckett and Cat Valentine have a new child to babysit: Captain Marvel, who ends up taking the girls along to stop a diabolical mastermind. Other sketches: MADvent Calendar, Can a Horse Fly a Helicopter?, Pacific Rooms, MAD Security Cam, Man of Surreal, Hobbit Shadow, Spy vs. Spy, and Frozen Computer
99	21	"Doraline / Monster Mashville"	Kevin Shinick, Justin Becker, Aaron Blitzstein and Marly Halpern-Graser	October 21, 2013	1.08
A mashup of Dora the Explorer and Coraline; Dora travels to the "other world", but gets more than what she bargained for. A parody of Nashville; Two monster songstresses duke it out to see who can write the best Halloween song ever. Other sketches: MADvent Calendar, Werewolf Shake, Halloweendex, Hollywood Scares, Spy vs. Spy, and Old Man Welker pretending to be Scooby-Doo
100	22	"MAD's 100th Episode Special" "MAD of Steel / Sanjay and Krang / Worst Show Ever"	Kevin Shinick, Justin Becker, Aaron Blitzstein, Marly Halpern-Graser and Amber Tozer	November 11, 2013	1.31
It's MAD's double-sized 100th episode spectacular! This anniversary-themed half-hour episode contains three parodies: 1. MAD of Steel: A parody of Man of Steel, Superman must defeat General Zod by going where no Superman movie, television show, or comic has gone before. The fight rages on until Barack Obama arrives and tells them to take it into space to evade further damages to Earth.; 2. Sanjay and Krang: A mashup of Sanjay and Craig and Teenage Mutant Ninja Turtles; Sanjay Patel adopts Krang from a pet shop, who keeps telling him that all his hopes and dreams can be achieved if he destroys the TMNT.; 3. Worst Show Ever: A musical parody of "Best Song Ever"; One Direction becomes stuck in a hotel room that has nothing but episodes of MAD on TV. They're inspired to write a song about how a song about how MAD might be the worst show on television, accompanied by a clip show of the first 100 episodes.; Other sketches: MADvent Calendar, "MAD's 100th Episode!", Number 100 Carved Out of Marble, Dog Fools His Owner, More Flunco! Products, Who Cut the Cheese?, Nose-Digging for Gold, MAD's Snappy Answers to Stupid Questions, Humpty Dumpty's Below-Average Fall, Clown at Inferior Rent-A-Car, Cavemen Office, World War DBZ, Hole in the Shape of the Number 100, Try Hitting the Return Button, MAD News, Alfred E. Neuman Popping Out of the Cake, Alligator Eats a Princess, In MADmoriam, Good Ideas, Inc. Closed Forever, Beached Whales, MAD Security Cam, Superheroes: They're Just Like Us, Spy vs. Spy, Number 100 Reflection, and Kaputnik Park Guest stars: "Weird Al" Yankovic and Henry Winkler
101	23	"Dullverine / Under the Dumb"	Kevin Shinick, Justin Becker, Aaron Blitzstein and Marly Halpern-Graser	November 18, 2013	0.91
A parody of The Wolverine; Wolverine goes all the way to Japan to avoid being in another boring Wolverine movie, but it doesn't work. A parody of Under the Dome; The small town of Chester's Mill, Maine is trapped under a stupid dome. Along the way, the plot is continuously called a rip-off of The Simpsons Movie. Other sketches: MADvent Calendar, It's Raining Bears and Tigers!, After Earth Aftershave, Nothing Happens, Less Impressive Super Hero Lairs, Jokey the Eighth Dwarf, Hood-ini the Hipster Magician, Spy vs. Spy, and Kid in a Candy Store Guest star: Keone Young
102	24	"Still Hungry Games / Agents of S.M.U.R.F."	Kevin Shinick, Justin Becker, Aaron Blitzstein and Marly Halpern-Graser	November 25, 2013	1.31
A parody of The Hunger Games: Catching Fire; The fans demand yet another Hunger Games, so there is one, leaving the tributes to try and escape. A mashup of Agents of S.H.I.E.L.D. and The Smurfs; A number of top secret agents are sent by Gargamel to capture the Smurfs. Other sketches: MADvent Calendar, Professor Late for the Train, Arrowbics, Firefighters of the Wild, Deads, and Spy vs. Spy
103	25	"Alfred's Game / We Are X-Men"	Kevin Shinick, Justin Becker, Aaron Blitzstein and Marly Halpern-Graser	December 2, 2013	1.18
A parody of Ender's Game; In the final MAD movie segment, the Earth's only hope is none other than Alfred E. Neuman, so we're doomed. The Sketch Stork notes that the segment is rushed and incomprehensible because the film itself isn't released yet. A mashup of X-Men and We Are Men; In the final MAD segment, the X-Men sadly get over their failed relationships. Other sketches: MADvent Calendar, Fish Playing Charades, the White House Down Comforter, Caveman Thought Glass Could Put Out Fire, Is This a Show?, Wile E. Coyote and the Road Runner Both Get Arrested, GargaMelrose Place, Tooth Fairies of the Old West, Spy vs. Spy, Ineffective Tactics for Faking That You're Sick, and Red-Headed Tree Note: This is the series finale.
