= Don't Shit Your Pants =

2009 video game

- Publisher: Cellar Door Games
- Designers: Teddy Lee; Kenny "Rete" Lee
- Engine: Adobe Flash
- Platform: Browser
- Release: February 19, 2009
- Genre: Text adventure game
- Mode: Single-player

Don't Shit Your Pants (stylized as Don't Shit Your Pants! A survival horror game) is a browser-based text adventure game created by Canadian developers Teddy and Kenny "Rete" Lee for Cellar Door Games. The objective of the game is to use a text prompt to prevent a balding man standing beside a closed door in pajama bottoms and an undershirt from defecating inappropriately. It was the first title released by the Lee brothers, receiving positive critical reception.

== Gameplay ==
The game is a browser-based text adventure comedy game, stylized as a parody of survival horror and is presented in a single room, and features a balding man standing beside a closed door in pajama bottoms or pajama pants and an undershirt. The main objective is to prevent a balding man from defecating in his pajama bottoms, and use the toilet behind the door, using a text prompt to enter in commands; the game starts upon the player entering the word "play". Up to ten achievements may be awarded for players experimenting with different ways for a balding man to defecate, providing incentive for outcomes other than the main objective.

== Development ==
Don't Shit Your Pants! was the first title that the Lee brothers released on the internet, as well as the first release by their company, Decade Studios, before they changed the name to Cellar Door Games. Kenny Lee explained that he had only started developing games seriously around the time of its release, although he had toyed with the concept for a while. The two were the sole developers of the game upon its creation; after receiving "incredible feedback" on it, however, the team soon grew to several developers, with one of the other individuals working on sound and design for DSYP. Meanwhile, Kenny Lee was responsible for the game's programming and art. The game, programmed in Adobe Flash, was originally developed with just a text display, but Lee decided to make it "a Hugo['s] House of Horrors-type game" with primitive graphics as well as text. Adobe Flash ceased operation at the end of 2020.

Elaborating on the art style of the game, Kenny Lee said he was inspired by adventure games produced in the Enhanced Graphics Adapter (EGA) display standard. He encountered difficulty emulating the 16-color palette due to newer applications enforcing visual improvements, such as anti-aliasing and a widened color palette, by default; because of this, he had to use Deluxe Paint, an older graphics application, in order to force the limited palette and screen resolution. Lee also stated that he had no prior experience in visual arts. Regarding its premise, Lee explained that it came from an email that made him "laugh out [loud] at work." The protagonist, intentionally left nameless, was not based on anyone in particular, but Lee based the design on Guybrush Threepwood from the Monkey Island series since he could not draw a completely original character design.

Production of the game took about two weeks; Lee commented that production time could have been shorter, but he had no prior experience with ActionScript, and the game could only be worked on during evenings. Its title was the only one ever worked with; Lee said that, while they had reservations about not changing it, the team decided to keep it the same as "the vulgarity would get people to click it". He added that, despite the name, they wanted to "keep it as clean as possible", in particular minimizing the display of excrement.

== Release and reception ==
The game was released onto the internet as freeware on February 16, 2009. DSYP was jokingly categorized as "survival horror" by co-developer Teddy Lee. It has since received popularity for its subject matter; Andrew Groen of The Penny Arcade Report called it the company's tour de force.

Writing for Esquire, Ben Collins called it "best video game in existence" and "much more difficult than it sounds" while on the topic of an interview with Jennifer Lawrence on the Late Show with David Letterman. Owen Good of Kotaku opined that it had "surprisingly strong replay value" despite its premise. IndieGames.com placed it third of the "best freeware experimental games" of 2009. John Walker of Rock, Paper, Shotgun called it "the sort of immature 30 seconds of nonsense" that only his colleague Sam who referred him to the game could have found. Multiple reviewers for The A.V. Club wrote that it "will elicit laughs from anyone still capable of appreciating a quality shit joke" and dubbed it "a digital companion piece" to the book Everyone Poops. Discussing the game during a review of the company's later title, Rogue Legacy, Chris Kohler of Wired felt that DSYP seemed a "micro-sized game" at first, but found that "through cleverly encouraging repeated replays, it provides more entertainment than a game of its scope otherwise would."
