= Tarō Gomi =

Japanese children's writer

Tarō Gomi (五味 太郎, Gomi Taro; born in Chofu, Tokyo) on August 20, 1945; 80 years ago, is a Japanese children's book writer who is currently one of Japan's most prolific children's book illustrators and authors.

== Biography ==
He is a graduate of the Kuwazawa Design Institute. His first children's picture book was published in 1973. He has published more than 400 books in Japan and his work has been widely translated into other languages.

Books published in English include Everyone Poops, Santa Through the Window, Where's the Fish? and The Crocodile and the Dentist.

He also provided songs for many children's shows, such as DanDanDanDan (だんだんだんだん), written in 1987.

His children's book Over The Ocean was awarded the Mildred L. Batchelder Award in 2017.
