= Everyone Poops =

1977 book by Tarō Gomi

- Hardcover English 1st ed.
- Author: Tarō Gomi
- Original title: Minna Unchi (みんなうんち)
- Translator: Amanda Mayer Stinchecum
- Illustrator: Tarō
- Cover artist: Tarō Gomi
- Language: Japanese
- Series: Kagaku no Tomo Kessaku-shū in Japan, My Body Science in the USA
- Genre: Children's non-fiction literature
- Publisher: Kane/Miller (Eng. trans)
- Publication date: January 17, 1977
- Publication place: Japan
- English publication date: March 1, 1993
- Media type: Print (hardcover & paperback)
- Pages: 27 pp
- ISBN: 978-0-916291-45-7 (first American edition, hardcover)

Everyone Poops is the title of US editions of the English translation (by Amanda Mayer Stinchecum) of Minna Unchi (みんなうんち), a Japanese children's book written and illustrated by the prolific children's author Tarō Gomi and first published in Japan by Fukuinkan Shoten in 1977 within the series Kagaku no Tomo Kessaku-shū (かがくのとも傑作集; i.e. Masterpieces of the friends of science).

The English translation has been published in the US by Kane/Miller, within the series "My Body Science", and by Scholastic. In Britain, the book is titled Everybody Poos and is published by Frances Lincoln.

The book tells children that all animals defecate and that they have always done so. The book is intended to relieve shame and embarrassment around the act of defecating by explaining to children that it is a natural part of life.

The book has also been translated into Chinese (traditional characters), Spanish and Thai.

== Story ==
The first sixteen pages contain various prompts regarding defecation in animals such as opposites ("An elephant makes a big poop" and "[a] mouse makes a tiny poop"), comparisons (that various species produce various sizes and shapes of poop) and questions ("What does whale poop look like?" and "Which end is the snake's behind?").

On the seventeenth page, a boy with black overalls and a red shirt is introduced, seen running into a bathroom. The book then goes on to explain how people of all ages, from adults to very young children, defecate, and how infants may use diapers. After that, there are only three more pages that do not feature the boy with those pages featuring rhinos, cats, pangolins, water buffaloes and alligators. On the next page of the book, the child uses toilet paper and flushes the toilet. The final portion of the book explains that because every animal eats, they must therefore defecate, and the book ends with rear views of the boy, a pig, a pelican, a zebra, a gorilla, a lion and a giraffe defecating and the words "Everyone Poops".

== Publication ==
Everyone Poops was written by Tarō Gomi, and first published by Tokyo-based Fukuinkan Shoten as Minna Unchi in 1977.

It was acquired by Kane/Miller in 1993. Kane/Miller was later bought by Educational Development Corporation. Everyone Poops is the best-known title sold by the company. This book is sold in the U.S. through traditional bookstores such as Barnes & Noble and on the party plan by independent booksellers.

== Editions ==
- (in Japanese) Minna Unchi (みんなうんち). Kagaku no Tomo Kessaku-shū (かがくのとも傑作集). Tokyo: Fukuinkan Shoten (福音館書店), 1977. For later printings, ISBN 4-8340-0848-7. 28 pages in Japanese edition.
- Everyone Poops. Trans. Amanda Mayer Stinchecum. My Body Science. Brooklyn, N.Y.: Kane/Miller, 1993. ISBN 0-916291-45-6.
- Everyone Poops. Trans. Amanda Mayer Stinchecum. La Jolla: Kane/Miller, 2001. ISBN 1-929132-14-X. New York: Scholastic, 2004. ISBN 0-439-72659-X.
- Everybody Poos. Trans. Amanda Mayer Stinchecum. London: Frances Lincoln, 2002. ISBN 0-7112-2046-8. London: Frances Lincoln, 2004. ISBN 1-84507-258-8
- (in Spanish) Todos hacemos caca. Trans: Leopoldo Iribarren. Brooklyn, N.Y.: Kane/Miller, 1997. ISBN 0-916291-77-4
- (in Thai) อึ (ชุด หนูอยากรู้) Krung Thēp: Samnakphim Phrǣo Phư̄an Dek, 1995. ISBN 974-89200-0-3. Krungthēp: ʻAmmarin, 2003. ISBN 974-247-036-7.

== See also ==
- Toilet training
- The Gas We Pass
- What's Your Poo Telling You?
- The Story of the Little Mole Who Knew It Was None of His Business
