= Suits season 7 =

Suits
- Season 7
- DVD cover
- Starring: Gabriel Macht; Patrick J. Adams; Rick Hoffman; Meghan Markle; Sarah Rafferty; Gina Torres
- No. of episodes: 16

Release
- Original network: USA Network
- Original release: July 12, 2017 – April 25, 2018

Season chronology
- ← Previous; Season 6 Next → Season 8

The seventh season of the American legal drama Suits was ordered on August 3, 2016, and started airing on USA Network in the United States July 12, 2017. The season has five series regulars playing employees at the fictional Pearson Specter Litt law firm in Manhattan: Gabriel Macht, Patrick J. Adams, Rick Hoffman, Meghan Markle, and Sarah Rafferty. Gina Torres is credited as the sixth regular only for the episodes that she appears in, following her departure last season.

The season featured the 100th episode of the series, which was directed by Patrick J. Adams and aired August 30, 2017. To celebrate the series' milestone, the main cast (including Gina Torres) and creator Aaron Korsh came together at ATX Television Festival for a live read-through of the series' pilot script. They were joined by Abigail Spencer and Nick Wechsler to read for the episode's guest stars.

After Markle's engagement to Prince Harry was announced on November 27, 2017, it was confirmed by show producers the next day that she would be leaving the show at the end of the season. The back half of the season aired from March 28, 2018, to April 25, 2018, concluding the season with a finale that saw the departure of both Markle and Adams.

== Cast ==
=== Regular cast ===
- Gabriel Macht as Harvey Specter
- Patrick J. Adams as Mike Ross
- Rick Hoffman as Louis Litt
- Meghan Markle as Rachel Zane
- Sarah Rafferty as Donna Paulsen
- Gina Torres as Jessica Pearson (Note: Gina Torres is credited as a regular cast member for the episodes she appears in, following her departure last season.)

=== Special Guest Cast ===
- Dulé Hill as Alex Williams

=== Recurring cast ===
- Christina Cole as Dr. Paula Agard
- Aloma Wright as Gretchen Bodinski
- Jordan Johnson-Hinds as Oliver Grady
- Peter Cambor as Nathan
- Wendell Pierce as Robert Zane
- Jake Epstein as Brian Altman
- Paul Schulze as Frank Gallo
- Ray Proscia as Dr. Stan Lipschitz
- Al Sapienza as Thomas Bratton
- Jay Harrington as Mark Meadows
- Zoe McLellan as Holly Cromwell
- Rachael Harris as Sheila Sazs
- Amanda Schull as Katrina Bennett
- John Kapelos as Elias Gould
- Bruce McGill as Stanley Gordon
- Nitya Vidyasagar as Stephanie Patel

=== Guest cast ===
- Megan Gallagher as Laura Zane
- Abigail Spencer as Dana Scott
- D.B. Woodside as Jeff Malone
- John Pyper-Ferguson as Jack Soloff
- Leslie Hope as Anita Gibbs
- Brynn Thayer as Lily Specter
- Brandon Keener as Xander Epstein

== Episodes ==
No. overall	No. in season	Title	Directed by	Written by	Original release date	U.S. viewers (millions)
93	1	"Skin in the Game"	Silver Tree	Aaron Korsh	July 12, 2017	1.40
Following his breakup with Tara, Louis starts terrorizing the associates. His behavior raises red flags with Rachel, Donna, and Gretchen. Donna has figured out that what she wants is a seat at the table as a senior partner. She uses the situation with Louis to prove to Harvey that she deserves it after all these years of being a key person in running the firm without getting credit. Harvey agrees to name her senior partner, but has to tiptoe around telling Louis. As Rachel convinces Louis that he needs closure with Tara, he allows Rachel, now a lawyer in her own right, to step up and take over the associates from him. Meanwhile, Mike and Harvey team up again to prove to one of Jessica's clients that the firm can handle his case now that Jessica is gone. Harvey has a hard time filling Jessica's shoes and pursues a romantic relationship with his former therapist, Dr. Paula Agard. Mike gives the legal clinic half a million dollars, but his returning to PSL doesn't sit well with his former colleagues, especially Oliver.
94	2	"The Statue"	Michael Smith	Genevieve Sparling	July 19, 2017	1.36
Harvey and Paula agree to get to know one another better. Drawing inspiration from Jessica herself to mark the change of leadership, Harvey decides to drop her oldest client while eyeing an important client from Alex Williams, a lawyer from his past. However, Alex is only willing to transfer said client if he is made name partner at Pearson Specter Litt, which Louis and Donna oppose. Louis is terrified to lose his fragile friendship with Harvey if Alex comes to the firm, so he tries to poach the client behind Alex's back. Harvey goes to meet with Jessica to get her on his side, but the meeting results in a fight. Meanwhile, Mike's pro bono case hits a snag when the opposing lawyer uses Mike's past to prejudice the judge. Katrina tells Harvey that his promoting Donna to senior partner has changed what it means to be named a partner to those both inside and outside the firm, leading to Harvey undoing Donna's promotion. He instead names her COO while agreeing that she gets to have a vote inside the firm. Harvey also denies Alex name partner, but offers him senior partner, which Alex accepts. Jessica and Harvey make up and she confirms that he's ready to take the lead.
95	3	"Mudmare"	Maurice Marable	Sharyn Rothstein	July 26, 2017	1.41
Louis has a nightmare about going mudding with Harvey in the other tub, only to have Alex join them and claim that he and Harvey go mudding all the time. After a discussion with his therapist, Louis agrees to try to be friends with Alex rather than possibly lose Harvey as a friend. Rachel deals with a fourth-year associate who repeatedly hands off menial procedural work to first-year employees. When Rachel confronts her, Donna steps in, undermining Rachel's authority in front of all the other associates. After an argument, both Rachel and Donna admit they have a lot to learn about their new positions in the firm. Rachel concedes she needs to focus on becoming a great lawyer more than being a supervisor and hands over the responsibility to Donna. Mike takes a pro bono case concerning the wrongful death of a prisoner, only to find out there's a conflict of interest because the parent company that built and runs the prison is one of Alex's clients. Mike hands the case off to Oliver, who reluctantly takes it after Mike tells him how the incident hits close to home. Elsewhere, Harvey's relationship with Dr. Agard hits a snag.
96	4	"Divide and Conquer"	Anton Cropper	Daniel Arkin	August 2, 2017	1.41
Rachel’s father questions if she and Mike can make time for the wedding and a marriage, as they both are busy with their careers. As Louis finds it difficult to get over Tara, Donna tries to manage the situation. Harvey meets Jessica for help with the fiasco at work and Mike finds it difficult not to help Oliver after signing the agreement to stay away from the prison case. While Louis and Alex get on better terms, Bratton Gould is trying to poach PSL clients, as someone seems to be leaking inside information. As a solution, Harvey tries to convince Zane to agree to a fake merger. Alex proves himself to be loyal to PSL and puts himself at risk to stop Tommy Bratton from coming after PSL clients. Mike and Rachel finally decide to set a date for their wedding, but set it far enough in the future to avoid stress. Harvey learns it was Jessica who leaked the information and he understands that she did so to unite PSL in a time of crisis. Rachel and her father have a heart to heart conversation for the first time in a long while.
97	5	"Brooklyn Housing"	Roger Kumble	Marshall Knight & Rob LaMorgese	August 9, 2017	1.29
While Mike agrees to work for the clinic on the prison case under the cover of a suit against the Brooklyn Housing Projects, Harvey suggests that Paula take Louis as her lawyer for her lawsuit with Jacob, her ex. Paula admits that she violated the terms of her professional agreement with Jacob. Donna feels that Harvey is hiding something from her. Harvey tries to get Mike’s help regarding a case and Mike’s absence makes him distressed. Holly Cromwell demands a job at PSL and Donna disagrees with Harvey’s decision. The return of Frank Gallo stirs things up. When Mike tries to extract information from Gallo about the prison rewarding him for starting fights, he demands that Mike get him early parole. Louis clears things with Dr. Lipschitz and wins Dr. Agard’s case. Elsewhere, Rachel discovers Mike is still working the prison case and warns him about the agreement. At the clinic, Nathan also deduces that Mike is helping Oliver.
98	6	"Home to Roost"	Valerie Weiss	Sandra Silverstein	August 16, 2017	1.47
Mike and Oliver visit Frank Gallo, who tips them off to a prosecutor who was going to bring a similar case involving him, but was forced to drop it. Rachel later has to lie to Harvey to cover for where Mike is that day, making her furious. Harvey finds out anyway when Gallo calls Donna, saying Harvey and Mike had better not try to screw him again. Meanwhile, Louis is hit with a sexual harassment lawsuit from Stephanie, the fourth-year associate whom Donna fired. Katrina tries to help by visiting Stephanie as a former colleague, but it still results in Louis needing to admit guilt. Louis eventually apologizes to Stephanie, telling her about losing his chance to be a father, only to find out his rant from before hit close to home with her. Elsewhere, Harvey tells Donna about dating Paula. Donna tells him she already knew, but later admits to Rachel that she didn't know, making her question herself. A pre-trial motion for the prison case goes sour when Alex shows up in court and calls out Mike, who is sitting in the back to support Oliver, forcing Mike to admit he violated conflict of interest and causing the case to be thrown out. Harvey appears to take Alex's side in a fight with Mike, but later visits Alex and demands he tell him the truth.
99	7	"Full Disclosure"	Cherie Nowlan	Ethan Drogin	August 23, 2017	1.35
In flashbacks to the Pearson Hardman days, it's revealed how Alex arranged for himself and Harvey to get junior partner positions at Bratton Gould, following Harvey's displeasure over Louis becoming junior partner ahead of him. Alex assures Tommy Bratton that Harvey's arrival is a "done deal," but Jessica ultimately convinces Harvey to stay, causing problems for Alex. Harvey apologizes to Alex and promises a favor if he ever needs it. Alex is given unwinnable cases for several years and his only way back is to become part of an unholy alliance between Bratton, Masterson Construction, and Reform Corp. – an alliance that Mike has just discovered in the present day. Mike asks Anita Gibbs to take over the Masterson case now that the civil case has been dropped, but Gibbs sees too many conflicts. In the past, it is also revealed that it was Jessica who got Louis to start seeing Dr. Lipschitz, while Donna is dumped by Mark (guest star Jay Harrington), her boyfriend of six months, when it becomes clear she will follow Harvey wherever he goes. In the present, Alex reveals all to Mike, including how his life could be in danger if Masterson is prosecuted, while Harvey reveals the same to Donna.
100	8	"100"	Patrick J. Adams	Rick Muirragui	August 30, 2017	1.51
Harvey asks Robert Zane to take over the prison case, but Zane will only agree if Harvey lets him try the case his own way. Later, Frank Gallo dies in prison, but not before Zane could record a damning video confession from him. Harvey accuses a rep from Reform Corp. of putting a hit on Gallo. While denying involvement, the rep agrees to sign a document revealing the alliance with Tommy Bratton. Harvey uses this to get Bratton to sign a document taking full responsibility and absolving Alex of any wrongdoing. Donna reconnects with her old boyfriend Mark and is taken aback when Mark invites her to his hotel room, even though he is currently married. Elsewhere, Louis wonders why Columbia Law didn't submit any candidates for the firm. He later learns that it's because Sheila Sasz is now working in their placement department. Sheila reveals she is engaged to another man, but invites Louis to a hotel room for one last fling. While Donna backs away at Mark's door, Louis enters Sheila's room.
101	9	"Shame"	Silver Tree	Sharyn Rothstein	September 6, 2017	1.64
Feeling shame and guilt following a night of passion with Sheila, Louis throws himself into a case with his associate Brian while simultaneously avoiding an appointment with Dr. Lipschitz. When Louis finally meets with Lipschitz, he explains his actions by saying that Sheila, not Tara, is his one true love. Mike, meanwhile, suggests that Harvey reestablish his strength by taking on a prosecutor who is making waves by going after corrupt Wall Street brokers and winning every case. After finding a client to defend, Harvey learns that the prosecutor, Andy Malick (Usman Ally), once worked with him in the Manhattan DA's office. Harvey does not remember Andy, but Andy definitely remembers Harvey as being Cameron Dennis' pet employee. Donna is drawn into the case as well, being the only other person aware of the shady things that went on under Cameron's leadership. Elsewhere, Rachel goes after predatory lenders in a pro bono case with her father, later learning that the case is deeply personal for Robert.
102	10	"Donna"	Michael Smith	Genevieve Sparling	September 13, 2017	1.68
Louis fails to keep Donna from being called to the stand. At the hearing, Malick interrogates Donna about the document she shredded in the Coastal Motors case. Under oath, she admits to doing so and later finds that Malick got the information from Holly. Mike and Harvey prove that Malick manufactured evidence, offering to ignore it if he drops the case against their client. Rachel and Robert Zane continue their trial against the bank executive who abused Jasmine Zane. Robert's emotions hinder their progress, but Rachel finds an alternative way to get the CEO fired. Louis helps Alex when Bratton Gould tries to poach a huge client. Malick retaliates by threatening to get Jessica disbarred for covering Mike's fraudulence. Jessica arrives at Harvey's home, telling him she is at peace with the consequences. Harvey insists on fighting Malik, but she reassures him and suggests that it's time to remove her name from the wall. Louis helps Donna realize that she should fight for love when he relays his own regrets over Sheila. When Harvey comes to talk to Donna, she kisses him, saying she just had to know how she felt.
103	11	"Hard Truths"	Christopher Misiano	Ethan Drogin	March 28, 2018	1.18
Harvey and Louis fight to protect the future of the firm from its past; Alex worries Mike's instincts could risk a client relationship; Donna and Harvey delve into the aftermath of their kiss. An off-camera Jessica agrees to the hard truths of being named “selfish, unethical, and reckless” in a press release from the firm signed by Harvey and Louis announcing that a “disgraceful chapter of the firm’s history is coming to a close."
104	12	"Bad Man"	Roger Kumble	Rick Muirragui	April 4, 2018	1.06
Harvey makes a personal sacrifice for his firm Specter Litt; Mike goes toe to toe with an unlikely opponent; Louis comes to terms with his new role.
105	13	"Inevitable"	Christopher Misiano	Genevieve Sparling	April 11, 2018	0.95
Harvey is forced into a difficult decision when the impossible is asked of him to choose love or loyalty. Mike and Rachel try to make time to discuss their future; Louis struggles with the rules of his illicit relationship with Sheila. Harvey breaks up with Paula.
106	14	"Pulling the Goalie"	Emile Levisetti	Aaron Korsh & Sharyn Rothstein	April 18, 2018	0.99
Mike attempts to distract Harvey with a case. Louis tries not to let emotion affect his judgment in a legal duel with Sheila's fiancé which ends up with Sheila and Louis reuniting. Meanwhile Donna tries to prove her worth to the firm when the building's landlord hits them with a huge lease increase.
107	15	"Tiny Violin"	Christopher Misiano	Aaron Korsh & Daniel Arkin	April 25, 2018	1.09
Mike tries to balance his loyalty to SL with his ongoing class action suit that could make or break the clinic. Donna discovers that Robert Zane's firm is expanding their offices to three floors, causing Louis to realize Gordon's lawsuit is part of a takeover of Specter Litt that would render Harvey and Louis effectively neutered, as they would always be outvoted. Harvey confronts Robert, who claims he knows nothing about a takeover but suspects his other fellow name partners, Rand and Kaldor, are behind it. Jessica comes to SL to ask for Harvey's help in defending her from keeping her law license back in Chicago. Donna, Louis, Mike and Rachel meet with Harvey at his apartment to tell him to help Jessica and that they'll take care of SL when he's gone to Chicago.
108	16	"Good-Bye"	Anton L. Cropper	Aaron Korsh & Daniel Arkin	April 25, 2018	1.07
Harvey is forced to help Jessica in Chicago, leaving Louis and Mike to deal with a lawsuit brought by former PSL partners and led by Stanley Gordon. In a bold move, Zane agrees to join Specter Litt as a name partner and bring enough of his senior partners to have a majority in any vote. Gordon then chooses to drop his suit, but claims they haven't seen the last of him. Jessica resolves her issues in Chicago by agreeing to work for the mayor. Rachel learns that the offer to head up a victim-oriented legal firm in Seattle is real, forcing her and Mike to move up their wedding date. Harvey returns to New York in time for Mike and Rachel's wedding. Mike gives Harvey the news that he and Rachel are moving to Seattle.

== Ratings ==
Viewership and ratings per episode of Suits season 7
No.	Title	Air date	Rating (18–49)	Viewers (millions)	DVR (18–49)	DVR viewers (millions)	Total (18–49)	Total viewers (millions)
1	"Skin in the Game"	July 12, 2017	0.4	1.40	0.4	1.31	0.8	2.71
2	"The Statue"	July 19, 2017	0.4	1.36	—N/a	1.27	—N/a	2.63
3	"Mudmare"	July 26, 2017	0.3	1.41	—N/a	—N/a	—N/a	—N/a
4	"Divide and Conquer"	August 2, 2017	0.4	1.41	0.4	1.38	0.8	2.79
5	"Brooklyn Housing"	August 9, 2017	0.3	1.29	0.5	1.54	0.8	2.83
6	"Home to Roost"	August 16, 2017	0.4	1.47	0.4	1.27	0.8	2.73
7	"Full Disclosure"	August 23, 2017	0.4	1.35	0.4	1.52	0.8	2.87
8	"100"	August 30, 2017	0.4	1.51	0.3	1.34	0.7	2.85
9	"Shame"	September 6, 2017	0.4	1.64	—N/a	—N/a	—N/a	—N/a
10	"Donna"	September 13, 2017	0.5	1.68	0.3	1.30	0.8	2.98
11	"Hard Truths"	March 28, 2018	0.3	1.18	0.3	1.14	0.6	2.32
12	"Bad Man"	April 4, 2018	0.3	1.06	—N/a	1.05	—N/a	2.11
13	"Inevitable"	April 11, 2018	0.2	0.95	0.3	1.05	0.5	2.00
14	"Pulling the Goalie"	April 18, 2018	0.3	0.99	—N/a	—N/a	—N/a	—N/a
15	"Tiny Violin"	April 25, 2018	0.3	1.09	0.3	1.14	0.6	2.23
16	"Good-Bye"	April 25, 2018	0.3	1.07	0.3	1.37	0.6	2.44
