= List of Suits episodes =

Episodes of American TV drama series

Suits is an American television drama series created by Aaron Korsh, which premiered on June 23, 2011, on the USA Network. It revolves around Mike Ross (Patrick J. Adams), who begins working as a law associate for Harvey Specter (Gabriel Macht), despite never attending law school. The show focuses on Harvey and Mike managing to close cases, while maintaining Mike's secret.

The series was renewed for an eighth season on January 30, 2018. In January 2019, the series was renewed for a ninth and final season which premiered on July 17, 2019. During the course of the series, 134 episodes of Suits aired over nine seasons, between June 23, 2011, and September 25, 2019.

== Series overview ==
Season	Episodes	Originally released	
Season	Episodes	First released	Last released
1	12	June 23, 2011	September 8, 2011
2	16	June 14, 2012	February 21, 2013
3	16	July 16, 2013	April 10, 2014
4	16	June 11, 2014	March 4, 2015
5	16	June 24, 2015	March 2, 2016
6	16	July 13, 2016	March 1, 2017
7	16	July 12, 2017	April 25, 2018
8	16	July 18, 2018	February 27, 2019
9	10	July 17, 2019	September 25, 2019

== Episodes ==
=== Season 1 (2011) ===
Suits season one episodes
No. overall	No. in season	Title	Directed by	Written by	Original release date	U.S. viewers (millions)
1	1	"Pilot"	Kevin Bray	Aaron Korsh	June 23, 2011	4.64
2	2	"Errors and Omissions"	John Scott	Sean Jablonski	June 30, 2011	3.89
3	3	"Inside Track"	Kevin Bray	Aaron Korsh	July 7, 2011	4.53
4	4	"Dirty Little Secrets"	Dennie Gordon	Jon Cowan	July 14, 2011	4.38
5	5	"Bail Out"	Kate Woods	Ethan Drogin	July 21, 2011	4.38
6	6	"Tricks of the Trade"	Terry McDonough	Rick Muirragui	July 28, 2011	4.44
7	7	"Play the Man"	Tim Matheson	Erica Lipez	August 4, 2011	4.03
8	8	"Identity Crisis"	Norberto Barba	Ethan Drogin	August 11, 2011	3.96
9	9	"Undefeated"	Felix Alcala	Rick Muirragui	August 18, 2011	4.45
10	10	"Shelf Life"	Jennifer Getzinger	Sean Jablonski	August 25, 2011	3.82
11	11	"Rules of the Game"	Mike Smith	Jon Cowan	September 1, 2011	3.96
12	12	"Dog Fight"	Kevin Bray	Aaron Korsh	September 8, 2011	3.47

=== Season 2 (2012–13) ===
Suits season two episodes
No. overall	No. in season	Title	Directed by	Written by	Original release date	U.S. viewers (millions)
13	1	"She Knows"	Michael Smith	Aaron Korsh	June 14, 2012	3.47
14	2	"The Choice"	Kevin Bray	Jon Cowan	June 21, 2012	3.80
15	3	"Meet the New Boss"	Michael Smith	Erica Lipez	June 28, 2012	3.88
16	4	"Discovery"	Kevin Bray	Daniel Arkin	July 12, 2012	3.70
17	5	"Break Point"	Christopher Misiano	Ethan Drogin	July 19, 2012	3.72
18	6	"All In"	John Scott	Karla Nappi	July 26, 2012	3.89
19	7	"Sucker Punch"	Adam Davidson	Genevieve Sparling	August 2, 2012	3.41
20	8	"Rewind"	Félix Alcalá	Rick Muirragui	August 9, 2012	3.42
21	9	"Asterisk"	Jennifer Getzinger	Justin Peacock	August 16, 2012	4.00
22	10	"High Noon"	Kevin Bray	Erica Lipez	August 23, 2012	4.48
23	11	"Blind-Sided"	David Platt	Ethan Drogin	January 17, 2013	3.57
24	12	"Blood in the Water"	Roger Kumble	Genevieve Sparling	January 24, 2013	3.75
25	13	"Zane vs. Zane"	Nicole Kassell	Rick Muirragui	January 31, 2013	3.36
26	14	"He's Back"	Kevin Bray	Daniel Arkin	February 7, 2013	3.07
27	15	"Normandy"	Terry McDonough	Jon Cowan	February 14, 2013	2.90
28	16	"War"	John Scott	Aaron Korsh	February 21, 2013	3.20

=== Season 3 (2013–14) ===
No. overall	No. in season	Title	Directed by	Written by	Original release date	US viewers (millions)
29	1	"The Arrangement"	Christopher Misiano	Aaron Korsh	July 16, 2013	2.93
30	2	"I Want You to Want Me"	Roger Kumble	Jon Cowan	July 23, 2013	2.88
31	3	"Unfinished Business"	Anton Cropper	Ethan Drogin	July 30, 2013	2.47
32	4	"Conflict of Interest"	Michael Smith	Daniel Arkin	August 6, 2013	2.99
33	5	"Shadow of a Doubt"	Félix Alcalá	Genevieve Sparling	August 13, 2013	2.79
34	6	"The Other Time"	John Scott	Rick Muirragui	August 20, 2013	2.76
35	7	"She's Mine"	Anton Cropper	Paul Redford	August 27, 2013	2.79
36	8	"Endgame"	Michael Smith	Justin Peacock	September 3, 2013	3.52
37	9	"Bad Faith"	Christopher Misiano	Ethan Drogin	September 10, 2013	2.95
38	10	"Stay"	Kevin Bray	Rick Muirragui	September 17, 2013	3.16
39	11	"Buried Secrets"	Cherie Nowlan	Erica Lipez	March 6, 2014	2.27
40	12	"Yesterday's Gone"	Anton Cropper	Genevieve Sparling	March 13, 2014	2.27
41	13	"Moot Point"	Kevin Bray	Daniel Arkin	March 20, 2014	2.35
42	14	"Heartburn"	James Whitmore, Jr.	Aaron Korsh & Erica Lipez	March 27, 2014	2.53
43	15	"Know When to Fold 'Em"	Anton Cropper	Jon Cowan	April 3, 2014	2.50
44	16	"No Way Out"	Michael Smith	Aaron Korsh & Daniel Arkin	April 10, 2014	2.40

=== Season 4 (2014–15) ===
No. overall	No. in season	Title	Directed by	Written by	Original release date	U.S. viewers (millions)
45	1	"One-Two-Three Go..."	Anton Cropper	Aaron Korsh	June 11, 2014	2.50
46	2	"Breakfast, Lunch and Dinner"	Roger Kumble	Genevieve Sparling	June 18, 2014	2.65
47	3	"Two in the Knees"	Anton Cropper	Chris Downey	June 25, 2014	2.76
48	4	"Leveraged"	Kevin Bray	Nora Zuckerman & Lilla Zuckerman	July 9, 2014	2.42
49	5	"Pound of Flesh"	Christopher Misiano	Daniel Arkin	July 16, 2014	2.33
50	6	"Litt the Hell Up"	Silver Tree	Rick Muirragui	July 23, 2014	2.70
51	7	"We're Done"	Cherie Nowlan	Aaron Korsh & Daniel Arkin & Genevieve Sparling	July 30, 2014	2.81
52	8	"Exposure"	John Scott	Justin Peacock	August 6, 2014	2.59
53	9	"Gone"	James Whitmore Jr.	Kyle Long	August 13, 2014	2.59
54	10	"This Is Rome"	Roger Kumble	Chris Downey	August 20, 2014	2.76
55	11	"Enough Is Enough"	Gabriel Macht	Nora Zuckerman & Lilla Zuckerman	January 28, 2015	1.87
56	12	"Respect"	Anton Cropper	Genevieve Sparling	February 4, 2015	1.67
57	13	"Fork in the Road"	Michael Smith	Rick Muirragui	February 11, 2015	1.46
58	14	"Derailed"	Patrick J. Adams	Justin Peacock & Kyle Long	February 18, 2015	1.70
59	15	"Intent"	Silver Tree	Daniel Arkin	February 25, 2015	1.80
60	16	"Not Just a Pretty Face"	Anton Cropper	Aaron Korsh	March 4, 2015	1.55

=== Season 5 (2015–16) ===
No. overall	No. in season	Title	Directed by	Written by	Original release date	U.S. viewers (millions)
61	1	"Denial"	Anton Cropper	Aaron Korsh	June 24, 2015	2.13
62	2	"Compensation"	Michael Smith	Rick Muirragui	July 1, 2015	2.27
63	3	"No Refills"	Anton Cropper	Chris Downey	July 8, 2015	2.16
64	4	"No Puedo Hacerlo"	Silver Tree	Genevieve Sparling	July 15, 2015	2.38
65	5	"Toe to Toe"	Kevin Bray	Nora Zuckerman & Lilla Zuckerman	July 22, 2015	2.09
66	6	"Privilege"	Michael Smith	Kyle Long	July 29, 2015	2.16
67	7	"Hitting Home"	Roger Kumble	Sharyn Rothstein	August 5, 2015	2.08
68	8	"Mea Culpa"	Kate Dennis	Daniel Arkin	August 12, 2015	2.31
69	9	"Uninvited Guests"	Silver Tree	Chris Downey	August 19, 2015	2.30
70	10	"Faith"	Anton Cropper	Genevieve Sparling	August 26, 2015	2.34
71	11	"Blowback"	Cherie Nowlan	Nora Zuckerman & Lilla Zuckerman	January 27, 2016	1.74
72	12	"Live to Fight…"	Rob Seidenglanz	Sharyn Rothstein	February 3, 2016	1.51
73	13	"God's Green Earth"	Anton Cropper	Genevieve Sparling & Sandra Silverstein	February 10, 2016	1.71
74	14	"Self Defense"	Patrick J. Adams	Kyle Long	February 17, 2016	1.58
75	15	"Tick Tock"	Roger Kumble	Daniel Arkin	February 24, 2016	1.73
76	16	"25th Hour"	Anton Cropper	Aaron Korsh	March 2, 2016	1.71

=== Season 6 (2016–17) ===
No. overall	No. in season	Title	Directed by	Written by	Original release date	U.S. viewers (millions)
77	1	"To Trouble"	Silver Tree	Aaron Korsh	July 13, 2016	1.85
78	2	"Accounts Payable"	Michael Smith	Ethan Drogin	July 20, 2016	1.65
79	3	"Back on the Map"	Cherie Nowlan	Rick Muirragui	July 27, 2016	1.78
80	4	"Turn"	Christopher Misiano	Daniel Arkin	August 3, 2016	1.81
81	5	"Trust"	Kate Dennis	Kyle Long	August 10, 2016	1.51
82	6	"Spain"	Silver Tree	Genevieve Sparling	August 17, 2016	1.68
83	7	"Shake the Trees"	Anton Cropper	Rick Muirragui & Sandra Silverstein	August 24, 2016	1.83
84	8	"Borrowed Time"	Gabriel Macht	Sharyn Rothstein	August 31, 2016	1.88
85	9	"The Hand That Feeds You"	Roger Kumble	Daniel Arkin	September 7, 2016	1.87
86	10	"P.S.L."	Kevin Bray	Aaron Korsh & Genevieve Sparling	September 14, 2016	1.92
87	11	"She's Gone"	Patrick J. Adams	Aaron Korsh & Rick Muirragui	January 25, 2017	1.37
88	12	"The Painting"	Gregor Jordan	Sharyn Rothstein & Sandra Silverstein	February 1, 2017	1.53
89	13	"Teeth, Nose, Teeth"	Silver Tree	Kyle Long	February 8, 2017	1.28
90	14	"Admission of Guilt"	Michael Smith	Ethan Drogin	February 15, 2017	1.21
91	15	"Quid Pro Quo"	Maurice Marable	Aaron Korsh & Daniel Arkin	February 22, 2017	1.25
92	16	"Character and Fitness"	Roger Kumble	Genevieve Sparling	March 1, 2017	1.13

=== Season 7 (2017–18) ===
No. overall	No. in season	Title	Directed by	Written by	Original release date	U.S. viewers (millions)
93	1	"Skin in the Game"	Silver Tree	Aaron Korsh	July 12, 2017	1.40
94	2	"The Statue"	Michael Smith	Genevieve Sparling	July 19, 2017	1.36
95	3	"Mudmare"	Maurice Marable	Sharyn Rothstein	July 26, 2017	1.41
96	4	"Divide and Conquer"	Anton Cropper	Daniel Arkin	August 2, 2017	1.41
97	5	"Brooklyn Housing"	Roger Kumble	Marshall Knight & Rob LaMorgese	August 9, 2017	1.29
98	6	"Home to Roost"	Valerie Weiss	Sandra Silverstein	August 16, 2017	1.47
99	7	"Full Disclosure"	Cherie Nowlan	Ethan Drogin	August 23, 2017	1.35
100	8	"100"	Patrick J. Adams	Rick Muirragui	August 30, 2017	1.51
101	9	"Shame"	Silver Tree	Sharyn Rothstein	September 6, 2017	1.64
102	10	"Donna"	Michael Smith	Genevieve Sparling	September 13, 2017	1.68
103	11	"Hard Truths"	Christopher Misiano	Ethan Drogin	March 28, 2018	1.18
104	12	"Bad Man"	Roger Kumble	Rick Muirragui	April 4, 2018	1.06
105	13	"Inevitable"	Christopher Misiano	Genevieve Sparling	April 11, 2018	0.95
106	14	"Pulling the Goalie"	Emile Levisetti	Aaron Korsh & Sharyn Rothstein	April 18, 2018	0.99
107	15	"Tiny Violin"	Christopher Misiano	Aaron Korsh & Daniel Arkin	April 25, 2018	1.09
108	16	"Good-Bye"	Anton L. Cropper	Aaron Korsh & Daniel Arkin	April 25, 2018	1.07

=== Season 8 (2018–19) ===
No. overall	No. in season	Title	Directed by	Written by	Original release date	U.S. viewers (millions)
109	1	"Right-Hand Man"	Christopher Misiano	Aaron Korsh	July 18, 2018	1.27
110	2	"Pecking Order"	Michael Smith	Genevieve Sparling	July 25, 2018	1.18
111	3	"Promises, Promises"	Roger Kumble	Rob LaMorgese & Marshall Knight	August 1, 2018	1.16
112	4	"Revenue Per Square Foot"	Michael Smith	Ethan Drogin	August 8, 2018	1.09
113	5	"Good Mudding"	Valerie Weiss	Sharyn Rothstein	August 15, 2018	1.15
114	6	"Cats, Ballet, Harvey Specter"	Emile Levisetti	Garrett Schabb	August 22, 2018	1.22
115	7	"Sour Grapes"	Gabriel Macht	Ian Deitchman & Kristin Robinson	August 29, 2018	1.13
116	8	"Coral Gables"	Christopher Misiano	Marshall Knight & Rob LaMorgese	September 5, 2018	1.30
117	9	"Motion to Delay"	Christopher Misiano	Aaron Korsh & Genevieve Sparling	September 12, 2018	1.07
118	10	"Managing Partner"	Silver Tree	Aaron Korsh & Ethan Drogin	September 19, 2018	1.08
119	11	"Rocky 8"	Roger Kumble	Michael L. Kramer	January 23, 2019	0.82
120	12	"Whale Hunt"	Valerie Weiss	Ian Deitchman & Kristin Robinson	January 30, 2019	0.91
121	13	"The Greater Good"	Darren Grant	Garrett Schabb	February 6, 2019	0.77
122	14	"Peas in a Pod"	Christopher Misiano	Sharyn Rothstein & Jordan Pomaville	February 13, 2019	0.78
123	15	"Stalking Horse"	Chloe Domont	Ethan Drogin & Genevieve Sparling	February 20, 2019	0.69
124	16	"Harvey"	Christopher Misiano	Aaron Korsh & Genevieve Sparling & Ethan Drogin	February 27, 2019	0.74

=== Season 9 (2019) ===
No. overall	No. in season	Title	Directed by	Written by	Original release date	U.S. viewers (millions)
125	1	"Everything's Changed"	Christopher Misiano	Aaron Korsh	July 17, 2019	1.04
126	2	"Special Master"	Michael Smith	Genevieve Sparling	July 24, 2019	1.04
127	3	"Windmills"	Gabriel Macht	Marshall Knight & Rob LaMorgese	July 31, 2019	0.94
128	4	"Cairo"	Anton Cropper	Sharyn Rothstein	August 7, 2019	1.00
129	5	"If the Shoe Fits"	Christopher Misiano	Jeffrey M. Lee & Jordan Pomaville	August 14, 2019	0.96
130	6	"Whatever It Takes"	Michael Smith	Ethan Drogin	August 21, 2019	1.05
131	7	"Scenic Route"	Emile Levisetti	Garrett Schabb	September 4, 2019	1.07
132	8	"Prisoner's Dilemma"	Julian Holmes	Ethan Drogin	September 11, 2019	0.97
133	9	"Thunder Away"	Robert Duncan McNeill	Genevieve Sparling	September 18, 2019	0.96
134	10	"One Last Con"	Aaron Korsh	Aaron Korsh	September 25, 2019	0.86

== Special ==
Title	Original release date	U.S. viewers (millions)
"Retrospective Special"	August 28, 2019	0.81

== Ratings ==
=== Season 1–6 ===
Suits : U.S. viewers per episode (millions)

Season	Episode number															
Season	1	2	3	4	5	6	7	8	9	10	11	12	13	14	15	16
1	4.64	3.89	4.53	4.38	4.38	4.44	4.03	3.96	4.45	3.82	3.96	3.47	–			
2	3.47	3.80	3.88	3.70	3.72	3.89	3.41	3.42	4.00	4.48	3.57	3.75	3.36	3.07	2.90	3.20
3	2.93	2.89	2.48	2.99	2.79	2.76	2.79	3.52	2.95	3.16	2.28	2.28	2.35	2.53	2.50	2.40
4	2.50	2.65	2.76	2.42	2.33	2.70	2.81	2.59	2.59	2.76	1.87	1.67	1.46	1.70	1.80	1.55
5	2.13	2.27	2.16	2.38	2.10	2.16	2.08	2.31	2.30	2.34	1.74	1.51	1.71	1.58	1.73	1.71
6	1.85	1.65	1.78	1.81	1.51	1.68	1.83	1.88	1.87	1.92	1.37	1.53	1.28	1.21	1.25	1.13

Audience measurement performed by Nielsen Media Research (Note: For the first season, see: Episode 1: Episode 2: Episode 3: Episode 4: Episode 5: Episode 6: Episode 7: Episode 8: Episode 9: Episode 10: Episode 11: Episode 12:) (Note: For the second season, see "Suits: Season Two Ratings". TV Series Finale. February 22, 2013. For the third season, see "Suits: Season Three Ratings". TV Series Finale. April 12, 2014. For the fourth season, see "Suits: Season Four Ratings". TV Series Finale. March 6, 2015. For the fifth season, see "Suits: Season Five Ratings". TV Series Finale. March 3, 2016. For the sixth season, see "Suits: Season Six Ratings". TV Series Finale. March 2, 2017. For the seventh season, see "Suits: Season Seven Ratings". TV Series Finale. April 26, 2018. For the eighth season, see "Suits: Season Eight Ratings". TV Series Finale. January 24, 2019.)

=== Seasons 7-9 ===
Suits : U.S. viewers per episode (millions)

Season	Episode number															
Season	1	2	3	4	5	6	7	8	9	10	11	12	13	14	15	16
7	1.40	1.36	1.41	1.41	1.29	1.47	1.35	1.51	1.64	1.68	1.18	1.06	0.95	0.99	1.09	1.07
8	1.27	1.18	1.16	1.09	1.15	1.22	1.13	1.30	1.07	1.08	0.82	0.91	0.77	0.78	0.69	0.74
9	1.04	1.04	0.94	1.00	0.96	1.05	1.07	0.97	0.96	0.86	–					

Audience measurement performed by Nielsen Media Research (Note: For the seventh season, see "Suits: Season Seven Ratings". TV Series Finale. April 26, 2018. For the eighth season, see "Suits: Season Eight Ratings". TV Series Finale. January 24, 2019. For the ninth season, see "Suits: Season Nine Ratings". TV Series Finale. September 26, 2019.)
