= Suits season 9 =

Suits
- Season 9
- Promotional poster for the season
- Starring: Gabriel Macht; Rick Hoffman; Sarah Rafferty; Amanda Schull; Dulé Hill; Katherine Heigl
- No. of episodes: 10

Release
- Original network: USA Network
- Original release: July 17 – September 25, 2019

Season chronology
- ← Previous; Season 8

The ninth and final season of the American legal drama Suits was ordered on January 23, 2019. With its renewal, it was announced that it would be the final season of the show with all regulars from the previous season returning. Unlike the second through eighth season, the ninth season consisted of ten episodes instead of sixteen. The final season premiered on USA Network in the United States July 17, 2019, followed by the premiere of spin-off series Pearson.

== Cast ==
=== Regular cast ===
- Gabriel Macht as Harvey Specter
- Rick Hoffman as Louis Litt
- Sarah Rafferty as Donna Paulsen
- Amanda Schull as Katrina Bennett
- Dulé Hill as Alex Williams
- Katherine Heigl as Samantha Wheeler

=== Recurring cast ===
- Patrick J. Adams as Mike Ross
- Denise Crosby as Faye Richardson
- Aloma Wright as Gretchen Bodinski
- Rachael Harris as Sheila Sazs
- Alison Louder as Susan
- Brynn Thayer as Lily Specter

=== Guest cast ===
- Sasha Roiz as Thomas Kessler
- Jeffrey Nordling as Eric Kaldor
- Stephen Macht as Henry Gerard
- David Reale as Benjamin
- Ray Proscia as Dr. Stan Lipschitz
- Brian Hallisay as Craig Cameron
- Derek McGrath as Mr. Paulsen
- Daniel Bellomy as Jeremy Wall
- Wendell Pierce as Robert Zane
- Benjamin Ayres as Gavin Andrews
- Jake Epstein as Brian Altman
- Kurtwood Smith as Ted Tucker
- Max Topplin as Harold Gunderson
- Amy Acker as Esther Edelstein
- Usman Ally as Andrew Malik
- Neal McDonough as Sean Cahill
- Eric Roberts as Charles Forstman
- Erik Palladino as Kevin Miller

== Episodes ==
No. overall	No. in season	Title	Directed by	Written by	Original release date	U.S. viewers (millions)
125	1	"Everything's Changed"	Christopher Misiano	Aaron Korsh	July 17, 2019	1.04
Donna and Harvey spend their first night together as a couple (second overall), but decide on holding off on telling their colleagues until the fall-out of Robert's disbarment has been settled. Harvey and Samantha fight to keep Robert's clients from leaving while they are actively being pursued by Eric Kaldor, who offers to stop in exchange for ten of Harvey's clients. Alex is approached by a representative of the New York bar association who hints that they have the power to replace Louis by Alex if they continue to refuse to remove Zane's name. After using that information to convince Louis, Alex attempts to organize a vote between the four remaining name partners and Donna, but Samantha threatens to reveal to the Bar what really happened if they remove Robert's name. Backed into a corner with no way to convince the clients not to jump ship, Harvey assigns his clients to Kaldor. However, the damage control comes too late as Louis is forced to agree to direct supervision by the Bar Association.
126	2	"Special Master"	Michael Smith	Genevieve Sparling	July 24, 2019	1.04
Harvey and Donna tell Louis about their relationship while he shares the news of the Bar's supervision. Bar representative Faye Richardson takes full control of the firm, which includes approving new cases, determined to make the firm fly right again. Samantha wants to represent a friend from the Military in a pro bono wrongful termination case, which involves urging her friend to accept being officially diagnosed with PTSD. Unable to make Samantha drop the case because of the time she claimed she took it, Faye strips her of the right to use company resources, so Samantha enlists Katrina's help while Katrina vows to keep her in line. Donna and Harvey work to keep Thomas Kessler as a client so Faye can't put him through an exit interview, but he decides to leave anyway, forcing Donna to come clean to Faye. Meanwhile, Louis has Benjamin hack the Bar bylaws in order to find a loophole they can use to force Faye out of the firm, but she finds out and makes Louis choose between resigning or being stripped of his managing partner title.
127	3	"Windmills"	Gabriel Macht	Marshall Knight & Rob LaMorgese	July 31, 2019	0.94
Faye takes over as acting managing partner from Louis. An old friend of Louis' presents him with an offer to become a judge and warns him that if he does not take it now and the whole situation with Faye ends badly, he will likely never have a shot at becoming a judge again. He wonders how his closest friends at the firm would do without him and vice versa. Samantha convinces Alex to put their heads together to find a legal way to get rid of Faye, but she takes things too far. Alex invites her to a family dinner and she comes to realize she has been off balance ever since Robert left. She decides to look for her biological family. Meanwhile, Katrina is blackmailed by Susan, an associate who knows about her flirtations with Brian and wants to be made her full-time associate despite disobeying orders. Harvey represents a CEO who is about to be fired by a board represented by Faye's former firm in an attempt to force Faye to cross a line to help out her former firm, but she maintains her innocence. Donna and Harvey vow to always support Louis.
128	4	"Cairo"	Anton Cropper	Sharyn Rothstein	August 7, 2019	1.00
Faye tells Donna that her relationship with Harvey is a conflict of interest and so she must lose her vote on the board. Alex encounters an old Bratton Gould colleague, Craig Cameron, who wants him to convince Samantha to take a deal in a case, or Craig will expose Alex's role in the Reform Corp murder cover-up. Harvey tries to make nice with Donna's father, which proves difficult given a past case that Harvey handled for him. Louis learns that Faye asked Katrina to rewrite the firm's code of conduct, and he asks Katrina to include a clause that will allow him to get Gretchen back from Faye. The name partners visit Faye and say they will all waive the conflict of interest clause in order to let Donna retain her vote. Faye reluctantly agrees after they all threaten to resign, and also allows Gretchen to return to working for Louis.
129	5	"If the Shoe Fits"	Christopher Misiano	Jeffrey M. Lee & Jordan Pomaville	August 14, 2019	0.96
Mike returns to New York City to pick a fight with Harvey. His client, basketball player Jeremy Wall, wants out of his shoe contract with Brick Street because of exploitative work conditions he witnessed on a trip to the factory. Samantha gets involved as Harvey handed the client to her a month prior and they agree to a fair fight with Faye watching them closely. When Mike takes things public through a damaging newspaper ad and turns down Samantha's proposition to settle, Samantha is left fuming. Mike outplays Harvey and reveals he set this case up to win, knowing the moves Harvey would make. While Harvey concedes, Samantha does not take the defeat well and produces evidence she needs to prove Mike wrong. While she has left no trail, Faye knows that Samantha manufactured the evidence and fires her. Sheila and Louis struggle with Sheila's self-confidence as she experiences the physical effects of pregnancy, and Louis confides in Alex for advice. Louis also tries to cheer up Sheila after she loses out on a large donation due to "baby brain". In therapy, she reveals she has been contemplating giving up her job to become a stay-at-home mother. Meanwhile, Donna makes Katrina see she has to find herself to get over Brian. Louis apologizes to Benjamin the IT head and then promotes him to Vice President.
130	6	"Whatever It Takes"	Michael Smith	Ethan Drogin	August 21, 2019	1.05
In the wake of Samantha's firing, the team rallies to try and get Faye dismissed. Samantha meets an old FBI contact who agrees to find something on Faye if Samantha will help him go after one of her clients, Gavin Andrews. Alex and Robert Zane pitch in to help. But Samantha gets double-crossed, as only she delivers her part in the bargain. Jointly, Harvey and Louis find something on Faye via her ex-husband. During their divorce proceedings, Faye learned that her ex was overcharging clients to fund a lucrative class action suit, and turned him into the Bar. But she then convinced the Bar to not prosecute him, thus preserving the money from the suit and allowing her to take it in the divorce. When Faye finds out, she confronts Harvey and says she only did it to spare their then-young daughter from having a father in prison. Donna convinces Harvey that this is not the way to get rid of Faye. Elsewhere, Brian shows up in Katrina's office with a suit against one of her clients. He claims he just wants her to get it dismissed so he can save face at his new firm. During the proceedings, in which Susan assists, Brian reveals an ulterior motive: he misses spending time with Katrina. As the episode closes, Samantha tells Harvey she located her biological father in Pittsburgh.
131	7	"Scenic Route"	Emile Levisetti	Garrett Schabb	September 4, 2019	1.07
Harvey and Samantha take the scenic route to meet Samantha's biological father. While on the journey, Samantha experiences rough memories of her childhood, also revealing she was in a relationship with Eric Kaldor. At the office, Donna asks Alex for a favor. Meanwhile, Louis pretends to be Harvey when he confirms a deal with Ted Tucker who is wanting Harvey. While Louis is pretending, Harold Gunderson learns that Harvey is the opposite counsel on a case, but Louis shows up saying Harvey sent him. Harold calls Harvey and tells him to meet him and have lunch with him, knowing he just had lunch with Tucker. Harvey then finds out that Louis is pretending to be him. Harvey and Samantha reach Pittsburgh and Samantha meets her biological father. She learns it was just a fling and he was not aware that she existed, and that her mother died when she was two. Knowing that nobody gave up on her, she is relieved. Back home, Donna surprises Harvey with the favor she asked Alex, giving him the painting by Harvey's mother. After seeing this, he calls his mother and says he regrets ignoring her for so many years.
132	8	"Prisoner's Dilemma"	Julian Holmes	Ethan Drogin	September 11, 2019	0.97
Harvey comes home to find Sean Cahill waiting for him. Cahill tells him Andrew Malik had him arrested for their collusion two years prior, swapping Mike's freedom for William Sutter. Sean hires Harvey as his attorney so they can communicate confidentially but Malik still tries to play them against one another, eventually convincing Sean to cut a deal through Faye. Harvey learns that his nemesis Charles Forstman told Malik of a deathbed confession from Sutter. However, Alex discovers through the timing of Malik's arrests and the fact that Sutter died of a heart attack (thus preventing a deathbed confession) that Malik made a deal with Forstman to fabricate the evidence in exchange for a reduced sentence. Harvey and Sean confront Malik leading to Harvey beating Malik once more and he is arrested by the FBI and is sent to prison. Meanwhile, Esther asks Louis to make sure a merger of her company does not happen because the man on the other side once sexually assaulted her, and she does not want to come forward. Louis lets his love for his sister cloud his judgment, but Samantha and Katrina rescue the case. When Harvey comes home, Donna tells him that his mother had a heart attack and passed away.
133	9	"Thunder Away"	Robert Duncan McNeill	Genevieve Sparling	September 18, 2019	0.96
At the funeral for Harvey's mom, Donna convinces Mike to team up with Samantha to take down Faye. They sue Faye for wrongful termination and Faye forces Harvey and Louis to defend her promising to leave if they win: but they cannot tell the other side about the deal or she will dismantle the firm. The case explodes causing more rifts between Harvey and Louis and Samantha and Mike. When Katrina crosses a line to try to help the firm, Harvey yells at her for jeopardising their deal with Faye. She confesses to Faye and urges her to find a way to win the case without destroying Samantha's career. Faye reluctantly agrees but fires Katrina for colluding against the firm. Harvey tells Mike he is calling him as a witness, causing him to wonder why he stopped trusting him.
134	10	"One Last Con"	Aaron Korsh	Aaron Korsh	September 25, 2019	0.86
As the trial continues, with Harvey calling Mike in as a witness and Louis facing pressure from Robert to end the drama, Faye insists that Harvey take the stand against Samantha the next day in order to win their case. Harvey then discloses to Mike the deal he made with Faye in order for her to leave the firm, and admits that he never stopped trusting Mike; who then suggests one last con together to stop Faye. Mike then offers Samantha another witness to testify against Faye: Katrina, who initially refuses because she is unhappy about the way Harvey treated her, but after Alex talks to her, she tells Faye that she will claim that Faye asked her to spy on Samantha and tamper the evidence. Furious, Faye orders Harvey to make sure Katrina is taken off the witness list, though he counters back and insists that Faye put their agreement in writing. When Faye arrives to sign the agreement the next morning, Samantha and Mike yell at Harvey for tampering with their witness and a brief fight erupts. When Faye intervenes, Gretchen, whom Louis came to the previous day, swaps out the documents at the last second, revealing that the "fight" between Harvey, Mike, and Samantha was a distraction, and resulting in Faye unknowingly signing a document admitting to witness tampering, essentially ousting her from the firm at the group's urging. She still refuses to back down until Harvey privately persuades her to leave, telling Faye he will give her what she wants (himself) but not the way she wants it. After Harvey tells the group that Faye is packing to leave, Louis rehires Samantha at the firm. The next day, Louis and Sheila get married with Stan officiating their ceremony, only to have Sheila go into labor, causing them to go to the hospital. On the spur of the moment, Harvey proposes to Donna and they marry on the spot. After Sheila gives birth to a daughter named Lucy, Harvey and Donna reveal to Louis that they are resigning from the firm and moving to Seattle to work with Mike and Rachel. Though this is what Harvey told Faye, he admits that while he likes working in the grey, he wants to do it for the good guys. Katrina is promoted to name partner as a thanks for helping to save the firm, making the final name of the firm Litt Wheeler Williams Bennett. Before leaving for Seattle, Harvey is visited by Mike; who "interviews" him for his new job. As Donna and Louis ride down the elevator for the last time together, Harvey looks around his office one last time and walks out before leaving for good.

== Production ==
=== Final season decision ===
With the renewal, creator Aaron Korsh offered insight on the decision to end the show with a 10-episode ninth season. He stated that he and USA Network decided to extend the cast contracts for two more years beyond season 7 after they wrapped production on season 6. Speaking on the shortened final season, he shared: "Our winter runs consist of 6 episodes, so we all felt like it would be very difficult to just have a truncated finale to a season. We always wanted to have the big 10 in the summer, to go out on a high note so to speak."

In addition to the ten first-run episodes, USA aired a repeat of the series pilot episode on August 28, with additional commentary from the cast members added.

=== Casting ===
Korsh revealed intentions to bring back characters from the past as it has "always been in the lexicon of Suits to bring people back and that's because I think that's how life works," but that the writers were deciding on whom exactly they wanted to bring back as too many returning characters would prevent the story from moving forward. He denied rumors started by British tabloids that they were trying to get Meghan Markle back for a cameo in exchange for a large donation to charity, although he did share that he and Patrick J. Adams were contemplating bringing Mike Ross back for the final season if it worked out with Adams' schedule. At the same time, he stated a cross-over with characters from Pearson had not been ruled out nor planned. On June 3, 2019, it was officially announced that Adams would return as a guest star for the fifth episode of the season. Korsh also hinted that he could re-appear in the series finale, though that was still uncertain. Additionally, Korsh stated that they would always welcome Markle back if she were to reach out, but he did not see it happening.

Following the eighth-season finale, Korsh stated in an interview that Wendell Pierce's Robert Zane was written out of the show given Pierce's uncertain availability for the ninth season. Nevertheless, Korsh hoped that they would be able to bring him back.

=== Writing ===
Additionally, Korsh shared that the ninth season would pick up shortly after where the eighth season left off. After the eighth-season finale, Korsh further shared that the ninth season would explore the newfound relationship between Donna and Harvey and teased that there could be marriage and death in the final season. On Patrick J. Adams' return, Korsh elaborated that Mike's return would see him embroiled in a case against Harvey and Samantha.

=== Filming ===
The table read for the fifth episode featuring Mike Ross' return was scheduled for mid-June with filming starting shortly after. Initially, Patrick J. Adams was going to direct the series' penultimate episode, thus the ninth of the season, but his signing on to star in The Right Stuff prevented that plan from coming to fruition.

== Ratings ==
Viewership and ratings per episode of Suits season 9
No.	Title	Air date	Rating (18–49)	Viewers (millions)	DVR (18–49)	DVR viewers (millions)	Total (18–49)	Total viewers (millions)
1	"Everything's Changed"	July 17, 2019	0.2	1.04	0.3	1.24	0.5	2.28
2	"Special Master"	July 24, 2019	0.2	1.04	0.3	1.08	0.5	2.12
3	"Windmills"	July 31, 2019	0.2	0.94	0.3	1.17	0.5	2.11
4	"Cairo"	August 7, 2019	0.2	1.00	—N/a	1.06	—N/a	2.06
5	"If the Shoe Fits"	August 14, 2019	0.2	0.96	0.3	1.22	0.5	2.18
6	"Whatever It Takes"	August 21, 2019	0.2	1.05	0.2	0.94	0.4	1.99 (Note: Live +7 ratings were not available, so Live +3 ratings have been used instead.)
7	"Scenic Route"	September 4, 2019	0.2	1.07	0.2	0.85	0.4	1.92
8	"Prisoner's Dilemma"	September 11, 2019	0.2	0.97	0.2	0.84	0.3	1.80
9	"Thunder Away"	September 18, 2019	0.2	0.96	0.2	0.92	0.4	1.88
10	"One Last Con"	September 25, 2019	0.2	0.86	0.2	0.93	0.4	1.79
