= Suits season 4 =

Suits
- Season 4
- DVD cover
- Starring: Gabriel Macht; Patrick J. Adams; Rick Hoffman; Meghan Markle; Sarah Rafferty; Gina Torres
- No. of episodes: 16

Release
- Original network: USA Network
- Original release: June 11, 2014 – March 4, 2015

Season chronology
- ← Previous; Season 3 Next → Season 5

The fourth season of the American legal comedy-drama Suits was ordered on October 22, 2013. The fourth season originally aired on USA Network in the United States between June 11, 2014 and March 4, 2015. The season was produced by Hypnotic Films & Television and Universal Cable Productions, and the executive producers were Doug Liman, David Bartis and series creator Aaron Korsh. The season had six series regulars playing employees at the fictional Pearson Specter, later Pearson Specter Litt, law firm in Manhattan: Gabriel Macht, Patrick J. Adams, Rick Hoffman, Meghan Markle, Sarah Rafferty, and Gina Torres. Both Gabriel Macht and Patrick J. Adams made their director debut this season, with Macht directing the eleventh episode while Adams directed the 14th episode.

== Overview ==
The series revolves around corporate lawyer Harvey Specter and his associate attorney Mike Ross, the latter practicing without a law degree.

== Cast ==
Regular cast

- Gabriel Macht as Harvey Specter
- Patrick J. Adams as Mike Ross
- Rick Hoffman as Louis Litt
- Meghan Markle as Rachel Zane
- Sarah Rafferty as Donna Paulsen
- Gina Torres as Jessica Pearson

Recurring cast

- Amanda Schull as Katrina Bennett
- Brandon Firla as Jonathan Sidwell
- Željko Ivanek as Eric Woodall
- D. B. Woodside as Jeff Malone
- Neal McDonough as Sean Cahill
- Brendan Hines as Logan Sanders

Guest cast

- Eric Roberts as Charles Forstman
- Tricia Helfer as Evan Smith
- Rebecca Schull as Edith Ross
- David Costabile as Daniel Hardman

Six actors received star billing in the show's first season. Each character works at the fictional Pearson Hardman law firm in Manhattan. Gabriel Macht plays corporate lawyer Harvey Specter, who is promoted to senior partner and hires an associate attorney who did not graduate from law school. Patrick J. Adams plays college dropout Mike Ross, who wins the associate position with his eidetic memory and genuine desire to be a good lawyer. Rick Hoffman plays Louis Litt, Harvey's jealous rival and the direct supervisor of the firm's first-year associates. Meghan Markle plays Rachel Zane, a paralegal who aspires to be an attorney but her test anxiety prevents her from attending Harvard Law School. Sarah Rafferty plays Donna Paulsen, Harvey's long-time legal secretary, confidant, and initially the only one at the firm who knows Mike never attended law school. Gina Torres plays Jessica Pearson, the co-founder and managing partner of the firm.

Brandon Firla reprises his season 3 role as Jonathan Sidwell, Mike's new investment banking employer. Željko Ivanek returns as Eric Woodall, though the season's first episode reveals he has left the U.S. Attorney's office to work for the SEC and go after Harvey from a different angle. D. B. Woodside appears as Jeff Malone, an SEC Attorney and Jessica's lover whom she later hires to work at Pearson Specter. Neal McDonough appears as Sean Cahill, an SEC prosecutor who picks up Woodall's cases against Harvey and the firm. Brendan Hines fills the role of Logan Sanders, Harvey's client who battles Mike and Sidwell for control of Gillis industries; he is also Rachel's former boyfriend. Eric Roberts portrays corrupt billionaire investor Charles Forstman. In the final arc of the season, Tricia Helfer guest stars as Evan Smith, the lawyer for powerful railway company Liberty Rail.

== Episodes ==
No. overall	No. in season	Title	Directed by	Written by	Original release date	U.S. viewers (millions)
45	1	"One-Two-Three Go..."	Anton Cropper	Aaron Korsh	June 11, 2014	2.50
Mike, now working as an investment banker, comes to Harvey with a plan to buy out Gillis Industries, whose creator (Michael Gross) made it his passion following the death of his son. Harvey mocks Mike's strategy and refuses to play along. Mike is hurt and wants Harvey to hear him out so he puts Pearson Specter under review. The son of an old client has now taken over his father's business and wants to make a splash with a takeover of the same target as Mike. Due to being put in review, Harvey must drop Mike as a client to avoid the conflict of interest. Meanwhile, Jessica must choose between a romantic or professional relationship with Jeff Malone, whom she hires after he leaves the Securities and Exchange Commission.
46	2	"Breakfast, Lunch and Dinner"	Roger Kumble	Genevieve Sparling	June 18, 2014	2.65
Mike and Harvey go into battle with each other when Harvey leaves Mike high and dry, and Rachel is stuck in the middle. Meanwhile, Louis feels threatened by Jeff.
47	3	"Two in the Knees"	Anton Cropper	Chris Downey	June 25, 2014	2.76
Logan Sanders---who's determined to take over Gillis Industries and "sell it for parts," while Mike has promised Gillis he'll keep the company and its employees afloat---orders Harvey to play dirty in his battle with Mike, and Mike's reputation and relationship with Rachel are not off limits. This includes revealing to Gillis that Mike once sold marijuana, angering Gillis because his son died over drug involvement. Meanwhile, Louis tries to bury the hatchet and make friends with Jeff.
48	4	"Leveraged"	Kevin Bray	Nora Zuckerman & Lilla Zuckerman	July 9, 2014	2.42
Desperate to prove to Gillis that his past hasn't changed his determination to keep Gillis Industries intact, Mike crosses the line to gain leverage on Harvey and Louis, Jeff and Jessica take their fight to the SEC, and Rachel reluctantly comes to Logan's assistance---despite her feelings of betrayal over their old affair as Logan's marriage fell apart.
49	5	"Pound of Flesh"	Christopher Misiano	Daniel Arkin	July 16, 2014	2.33
Mike tries to bluff Harvey with his newfound money courtesy of an old adversary (Eric Roberts) of Harvey's, but the move backfires. Rachel, overworked and refusing to take a day off, collapses at law school and is hospitalized; Mike and Harvey briefly reconcile, but are soon at odds again over SEC allegations of collusion. Louis helps Donna learn her lines for a production of The Merchant of Venice and later takes a role in the play himself. Rachel returns to the office to find flowers from Logan.
50	6	"Litt the Hell Up"	Silver Tree	Rick Muirragui	July 23, 2014	2.70
Rachel goes to Logan's apartment to confront him about the flowers, and the two share a kiss. Mike tries to use the leverage afforded by Forstman's investment to make a deal, but Mike, at Rachel's urging, tries to humiliate Logan in the process, blowing up the deal. Louis finds a way to turn the tables; Forstman betrays Mike by selling his shares to Logan, then tells Sidwell about his deal with Mike to cut Sidwell out, and Mike is fired.
51	7	"We're Done"	Cherie Nowlan	Aaron Korsh & Daniel Arkin & Genevieve Sparling	July 30, 2014	2.81
Rachel confesses to Mike about the kiss with Logan she pried herself loose from, and Mike is quietly furious. Harvey looks for a way to get Mike back on his feet, while Rachel anguishes over possibly losing Mike. Jessica gives Louis a chance to choose a reward after his big win.
52	8	"Exposure"	John Scott	Justin Peacock	August 6, 2014	2.59
The firm is under attack when Sean Cahill brings a warrant to get the documents on the Gillis takeover, including the one Louis and Katrina tried to bury. Though initially Jessica and Harvey are able to throw out the warrant and get a hearing, Sean Cahill presents a signed affidavit by Logan Sanders to request for the documents regarding the communication between Mike and Harvey on the case which is then accepted by the judge. Mike sets a plan in motion to handover all the files regarding the Gillis takeover only with a threat of a malicious prosecution charge on Cahill because they are sure that there is nothing to hide. Later when Louis hears this he is devastated and judging by his reaction and his previous actions Mike informs Harvey that he thinks Louis did something illegal. Meanwhile, Rachel tries to repair things with Mike.
53	9	"Gone"	James Whitmore Jr.	Kyle Long	August 13, 2014	2.59
After Louis confesses his wrongdoings in the Forstman deal to Jessica, the firm is forced to go on the offensive against Sean Cahill. Rachel and Mike reconcile cautiously, after Rachel admits to Mike she can't forget the image of him and Tess any more easily than he can the image of her with Logan. Harvey tries to keep Louis from being fired over the Forstman deal. But in the end, Louis resigns from Pearson Specter with immediate effect.
54	10	"This Is Rome"	Roger Kumble	Chris Downey	August 20, 2014	2.76
After Louis resigns from Pearson Specter, Harvey, Mike and Donna try to help him get back on his feet, but Jessica's refusal to budge on his contract could hurt all of them in the long run. Louis finally discovers Mike's secret and confronts Jessica about it.
55	11	"Enough Is Enough"	Gabriel Macht	Nora Zuckerman & Lilla Zuckerman	January 28, 2015	1.87
Louis uses his new leverage to become a name partner, rub Jessica and Harvey's noses in it, and promises to make Mike's life a living Hell until he breaks his will and resigns.
56	12	"Respect"	Anton Cropper	Genevieve Sparling	February 4, 2015	1.67
Harvey takes on Professor Gerard as a client in a bribery investigation and discovers that he may have committed an ethics violation, and Louis makes a catastrophic mistake with his first client, as a named partner.
57	13	"Fork in the Road"	Michael Smith	Rick Muirragui	February 11, 2015	1.46
While Harvey helps Mike and Louis settle their differences on a road trip to see a client, Harvey flashes back six years to his initial rift with Louis, and Mike flashes back to his first encounter with a firm. In the end, Louis and Mike settle their differences.
58	14	"Derailed"	Patrick J. Adams	Justin Peacock & Kyle Long	February 18, 2015	1.70
Mike takes on a whistleblower case at Professor Gerard's request, but struggles to keep Harvey from meddling. Jeff uses the office receptionists to get under Louis' skin. Jessica struggles to gain Jeff's trust as he tries to take the next step in their relationship.
59	15	"Intent"	Silver Tree	Daniel Arkin	February 25, 2015	1.80
Harvey finds out that Donna may have broken the law to help Mike get a document in the whistleblower case, but he may not be able to save her. Meanwhile, Jessica tries to figure out her next step in her relationship with Jeff. In the end, Harvey is able to save Donna.
60	16	"Not Just a Pretty Face"	Anton Cropper	Aaron Korsh	March 4, 2015	1.55
Sean Cahill comes to Harvey asking for one more chance to take a shot at Charles Forstman as he couldn't find the money. Sean wants Harvey to find the money or else Sean will get fired in 5 days. The episode also gives flashback of his first encounter with Donna and Forstman. Donna is left with a tough decision after Louis' secretary Norma dies. Mike asks Rachel to marry him. Donna tells Harvey that she’s leaving him to work for Louis.

== Ratings ==
No.	Title	Original air date	Time slot (EST)	Viewers (in millions)	Rating (Adults 18–49)	18-49 Rank on Cable	Note
1	"One-Two-Three Go…"	June 11, 2014	Thursdays; 9:00 p.m.	2.50	0.7	#3	
2	"Breakfast, Lunch and Dinner "	June 18, 2014	Thursdays; 9:00 p.m.	2.65	0.8	#6	
3	"Two in the Knees"	June 25, 2014	Thursdays; 9:00 p.m.	2.76	0.8	#3	
4	"Leveraged"	July 9, 2014	Thursdays; 9:00 p.m.	2.42	0.7	#4	
5	"Pound of Flesh"	July 16, 2014	Thursdays; 9:00 p.m.	2.33	0.7	#1	
6	"Litt the Hell Up"	July 23, 2014	Thursdays; 9:00 p.m.	2.70	0.9	#2	
7	"We're Done"	July 30, 2014	Thursdays; 9:00 p.m.	2.80	0.9	#4	
8	"Exposure"	August 6, 2014	Thursdays; 9:00 p.m.	2.59	0.7	#3	
9	"Gone"	August 13, 2014	Thursdays; 9:00 p.m.	2.58	0.8	#6	
10	"This Is Rome"	August 20, 2014	Thursdays; 9:00 p.m.	2.76	0.8	#3	
11	"Enough Is Enough"	January 28, 2015	Thursdays; 9:00 p.m.	1.87	0.6	#12	
12	"Respect"	February 4, 2015	Thursdays; 9:00 p.m.	1.67	0.6	#8	
13	"Fork in the Road"	February 11, 2015	Thursdays; 9:00 p.m.	1.46	0.4	#18	
14	"Derailed"	February 18, 2015	Thursdays; 9:00 p.m.	1.70	0.5	#15	
15	"Intent"	February 25, 2015	Thursdays; 9:00 p.m.	1.80	0.5	#9	
16	"Not Just a Pretty Face"	March 4, 2015	Thursdays; 9:00 p.m.	1.55	0.5	#8	
