= Suits season 8 =

Suits
- Season 8
- DVD cover.
- Starring: Gabriel Macht; Rick Hoffman; Sarah Rafferty; Amanda Schull; Dulé Hill; Katherine Heigl
- No. of episodes: 16

Release
- Original network: USA Network
- Original release: July 18, 2018 – February 27, 2019

Season chronology
- ← Previous; Season 7 Next → Season 9

The eighth season of the American legal drama Suits was ordered on January 30, 2018, and began airing on USA Network in the United States July 18, 2018.

The season saw extensive cast changes with the departures of Patrick J. Adams (Mike Ross), Meghan Markle (Rachel Zane), and Gina Torres (Jessica Pearson) at the conclusion of the previous season. Previously recurring guest stars Amanda Schull (Katrina Bennett) and Dulé Hill (Alex Williams) were promoted to series regulars, while Katherine Heigl joined the main cast as senior partner Samantha Wheeler.

The second half of the season premiered on January 23, 2019.

== Cast ==
=== Regular cast ===
- Gabriel Macht as Harvey Specter
- Rick Hoffman as Louis Litt
- Sarah Rafferty as Donna Paulsen
- Amanda Schull as Katrina Bennett
- Dulé Hill as Alex Williams
- Katherine Heigl as Samantha Wheeler

=== Special guest cast ===
- David Costabile as Daniel Hardman

=== Recurring cast ===
- Wendell Pierce as Robert Zane
- Rachael Harris as Sheila Sazs
- Aloma Wright as Gretchen Bodinski
- Ray Proscia as Dr. Stan Lipschitz
- Jake Epstein as Brian Altman

=== Guest cast ===
- Abigail Spencer as Dana Scott
- Ava Allan as Daisy Jones
- Gary Cole as Cameron Dennis
- Jeffrey Nordling as Eric Kaldor
- Usman Ally as Andrew Malik
- Neal McDonough as Sean Cahill
- Sasha Roiz as Thomas Kessler
- Ian Reed Kesler as Stu Buzzini

== Episodes ==
No. overall	No. in season	Title	Directed by	Written by	Original release date	U.S. viewers (millions)
109	1	"Right-Hand Man"	Christopher Misiano	Aaron Korsh	July 18, 2018	1.27
The newly merged firm has a conflict of interest between two clients, which Harvey and Robert use as a competition to decide which one of them becomes managing partner. Harvey and Robert acquire the help of their right-hand men Alex and Samantha, respectively, to convince one of the clients to drop the overlapping division that cause the conflict. Both Alex and Samantha are invested in order to solidify their claim to become the next name partner, which introduces Specter Litt's lawyers to Samantha's tactics. Donna helps Harvey see that he is tired of the view on top of the mountain, making him concede to Robert. Katrina asks to be tasked with firing the least efficient associates, but it gets complicated when Louis's favorite associate Brian ends up on the to-be-fired list.
110	2	"Pecking Order"	Michael Smith	Genevieve Sparling	July 25, 2018	1.18
The merged firm is renamed Zane Specter Litt (ZSL) with Robert Zane as its managing partner. An old client of Mike's comes knocking for help when 50 million dollars for a new business venture goes missing, meaning he might be accused of embezzlement. Harvey suspects that his business partner made the money disappear, but Robert fears he is too trusting of Mike's friend and secretly puts Samantha on the case as well. While the two lawyers bicker over the right strategy to find the guilty party, Donna enlists the help of Gretchen to find out who exactly Samantha is and whose team she is playing for. Sheila urges Louis to fight for managing partner, which brings to light Louis's concerns about their relationship dynamics and showing his worth to Harvey and Robert. Meanwhile, Alex sets out to prove his worth for name partner by attempting to poach Gavin Andrews, one of Robert's former important clients from Rand Kaldor.
111	3	"Promises, Promises"	Roger Kumble	Rob LaMorgese & Marshall Knight	August 1, 2018	1.16
Harvey finds out that the firm's cleaning lady does not receive the payments for her overtime, which she need for her mother's medical costs, because of a manager title given to her by David Fox, the firm's landlord. While the other name partners and Donna tell him not to, he starts a fight with Fox. Alex is successful in signing Gavin Andrews but he is immediately tasked with carrying out a plan set up by Gavin to launder money. Alex pleads with Samantha to help him find a way out without firing him as a client, which would backfire on the new firm's reputation. Later, Samantha informs him that Robert promised her name partner. Meanwhile, Katrina is given the chance to prove her worth for senior partner by showcasing leadership over Brian, but Brian has to step up when stress-induced migraines take her out of the game.
112	4	"Revenue Per Square Foot"	Michael Smith	Ethan Drogin	August 8, 2018	1.09
Louis and Sheila are trying to conceive. While on his way to dinner with a client and Robert, Louis is mugged. His pride prevents him from telling Robert what truly happened. Robert then assigns Louis' client to Samantha as a punishment, but the two end up working the case together. Samantha notices he is behaving oddly and informs Harvey of this, leading to Harvey providing a safe place for Louis to come clean, even though Samantha ends up the most valuable support of all by teaching Louis self-defense. Harvey helps Alex sign a new client to improve his standing with Robert, who does not like the way they pulled it off and demands that Alex either drop the client or forget about making name partner. Donna helps Robert see that his micro-managing caused his previous partners to stab him in the back, suggesting he do things differently this time around.
113	5	"Good Mudding"	Valerie Weiss	Sharyn Rothstein	August 15, 2018	1.15
Alex's daughter Joy is suspended from school and she spends the day at the office. Since she is acting out, Alex asks Samantha to keep an eye on her as she is the cool one from Joy's perspective. After they bond over similar experiences, Samantha ends up using Joy for her deposition, which rubs Alex the wrong way. Following a confrontation, Samantha realizes what she did was wrong and tells Joy that her father is the cool one. Later, Alex informs Samantha about Harvey's promise to him and they openly declare a competition for name partner. Harvey leaves to represent his brother when his sister-in-law files for divorce, which becomes a painful reminder of his family's secretive behaviors. Meanwhile, after Sheila asks him to get a fertility check-up, Louis is told to forego mudding to increase the chances of conceiving.
114	6	"Cats, Ballet, Harvey Specter"	Emile Levisetti	Garrett Schabb	August 22, 2018	1.22
After hearing that his brother's divorce is still happening, Harvey lashes out at Louis when he asks Harvey to fill in for him at a meeting so he can spend the afternoon with Sheila. Louis then decides it is time for the two of them to work on their relationship. After a shared session with Lipschitz goes wrong, Harvey goes to therapy by himself and comes to realize he is afraid that Louis will leave him once he has a baby, like Jessica, Mike, Rachel, and his sister-in-law have left him. Alex recommends Samantha for a pro bono case that Donna holds close to her heart because her best friend's charity is involved. The fragile friendship between Samantha and Donna is threatened when the former suspects something shady is going on and acts on her instincts behind Donna's back. Katrina learns the value of friendship when Brian assists her on the case that will determine her future as senior partner.
115	7	"Sour Grapes"	Gabriel Macht	Ian Deitchman & Kristin Robinson	August 29, 2018	1.13
David Fox enlists a reluctant Harvey's help to buy a building from his competitor without him knowing he is behind it, which leads to Harvey discovering the reason behind David's tough exterior. Donna asks Samantha to join in on the case to make up for Harvey's reluctance as well to create a family bond between the lawyers in preparation for the upcoming divisive name partner vote. Alex joins Robert at his vineyard when the latter wants to sue the man who was supposed to deliver barrels for his wine, but in failing to do so caused all of Robert's wine to turn sour. Robert suspects racist motivations behind the delay in delivery and has a hard time accepting Alex's advice. A false-positive pregnancy test causes Louis and Sheila to discuss how they will raise their child concerning their different religions.
116	8	"Coral Gables"	Christopher Misiano	Marshall Knight & Rob LaMorgese	September 5, 2018	1.30
Samantha plans to impress Robert by poaching client from her old boss Eric Kaldor, but he backs her into a corner by threatening to reveal that she once buried evidence, which she did to keep an innocent woman out of jail. Samantha plans to silence Eric's smoking Gun, Betty Palmer, a former colleague of hers who tried to stop her back in the day and whose career Samantha destroyed in response. Samantha has to accept defeat when Harvey, who has been helping out on the case, puts his foot down and refuses to let her once again destroy Betty's life. Louis is thrown for a loop when Sheila's top fertility specialist turns out to be his high school bully, making him turn to Lipschitz for guidance. After a mistake of hers costs Alex a client despite calling in all possible favors, Gretchen contemplates retiring but Donna talks her out of it.
117	9	"Motion to Delay"	Christopher Misiano	Aaron Korsh & Genevieve Sparling	September 12, 2018	1.07
Tommy Bratton comes for Zane Specter Litt with a lawsuit claiming that Robert and Harvey conspired to bribe Frank Gallo into entering fabricated evidence. Professional tensions between Samantha and Alex rise when they end up on opposing sides of Dexhart Insurance vs. Gavin Andrews, but Robert orders one of them to drop their client in order to present a united front against Bratton. However, when it becomes clear that Samantha goaded her client into suing Gavin, tensions reach an all-time high and all name partners and Donna are drawn in when the case re-ignites the burning question of who will be made name partner. Katrina is officially made a senior partner and she makes Brian her associate. Together, they take on a big fashion company knocking off a small designer's work, which forces Katrina to face her growing feelings for Brian when he saves her from opening herself up to exposure. Harvey suggests that Alex and Samantha should fight and whoever wins, will be the new name partner.
118	10	"Managing Partner"	Silver Tree	Aaron Korsh & Ethan Drogin	September 19, 2018	1.08
Harvey, Louis and Robert agree to let Samantha and Alex go up against one another in court in order to decide who will make name partner. Flashbacks reveal that, with the FBI pushing her to deliver evidence, Samantha once saved Robert's career by engineering a takeover when their old firm's name partners implicated Robert in their money laundering. Samantha deliberately recused herself since it was not her time yet, thus resulting in Robert owing her. While Alex wins the case due to Samantha showing Gavin Andrews some mercy for his family, Samantha presses Robert to disregard the agreement and promote her anyway. Aware that the battle is about to tear the firm apart, Donna orchestrates a plan to make Louis managing partner and have him promote both Alex and Samantha, who agree in order to finally establish a united front in the firm. Sheila gets a chance at being promoted to dean and announces that she is pregnant.
119	11	"Rocky 8"	Roger Kumble	Michael L. Kramer	January 23, 2019	0.82
The firm is renamed Zane Specter Litt Wheeler Williams with Louis taking the reins as the new managing partner. Harvey and Robert work on a case against Deputy AG Andrew Malik, who had Jessica disbarred. Harvey tells Louis about the case and Louis tells him that he trusts Harvey will win. One of Louis' oldest clients, Thomas Kessler, comes to visit. Louis gives the contract issue to Alex and Donna handles finding a General Counsel. But when Alex tells Louis something he does not like about the contract, Louis gets mad and takes it back from him but with Donna's help, he gives the case back to Alex and Alex saves the day. Donna finds a new General Counsel for Thomas's company. Malik is bringing charges against a boxing promoter named Jim Allen. Allen's boxer Ricky threw a fight and Malik charges that it was Allen's idea to do this. Ricky has brain damage from years of boxing. Harvey and Robert go to Malik's office and hand him a deal, one that he cannot refuse. The deal will ruin Malik's future and charges are dropped against Harvey's clients.
120	12	"Whale Hunt"	Valerie Weiss	Ian Deitchman & Kristin Robinson	January 30, 2019	0.91
Brian and Katrina work on a copyright infringement case where one perfume company has plagiarized another's product. There is romantic tension between them who find themselves unusually attracted to each other. Neither is able to fight it off entirely, nor are they able to take it to the next step. Louis asks Harvey to get Steve as client. A game of poker brings Harvey and Louis together to land Steve as client which Harvey wins but meanwhile they both understand that they need to go hand in hand. Samantha and Alex's wife form a bond over a case. Alex told Samantha that he will stay out of the case because that could cost them their relationship. On the case, Samantha will not settle for less when Alex's wife is perfectly fine and content with the amount. Alex convinces Samantha and they win.
121	13	"The Greater Good"	Darren Grant	Garrett Schabb	February 6, 2019	0.77
Harvey and Donna are caught in a situation when their former tenant Stu is being blackmailed by his workmate Nick over stock manipulation, which affects the firm. Harvey goes to Sean Cahill. Turns out Harvey has used up his many favors with Sean, including getting Mike's freedom from prison. If Nick decides to confess to Stu's stock manipulation, Sean does not have any problem putting the handcuffs on Harvey. In the end though, Harvey and Sean end up working together after all to take down Nick over blackmail. Judy, a familiar face from Samantha's past, comes to Samantha for help. She's conflicted about whether to take the case but Robert convinces her that she should. Katrina tells Brian that in a year's time, he will get a promotion and she will find the right replacement in the empty spot. This just means they cannot be around each other anymore. Feeling lonely, Harvey makes a call to Mike and leaves a heartfelt message.
122	14	"Peas in a Pod"	Christopher Misiano	Sharyn Rothstein & Jordan Pomaville	February 13, 2019	0.78
Katrina and Samantha are working on a case when the two are blindsided by Scottie in court. Samantha swears revenge on Scottie. She discovers the dirt on Scottie. Harvey came to Scottie with a settlement, but she rejected his offer. Meanwhile, Alex is having problems with his own case. In his case, the widower claims the device failed to notify him of his dead wife's diabetes which was the company's fault that his wife died. Louis is conflicted because Dr. Lipschitz does not want to believe he could misdiagnose a patient. But in order to prove he is still good at his job, Louis has to show his client is dangerous at the stand. Katrina refuses to play dirty tricks on Scottie. In the end, Samantha makes an offer to Scottie that she cannot refuse. Louis ends up making a deal with the client and saves Dr. Lipschitz. In return, Dr. Lipschitz promises to return Louis' emails in a timely and faster manner. Knowing the widower is right, Alex makes sure his client pays for a charity foundation.
123	15	"Stalking Horse"	Chloe Domont	Ethan Drogin & Genevieve Sparling	February 20, 2019	0.69
One of Harvey's clients provides Thomas Kessler with an excellent deal. However, after an all but official agreement is made, Harvey finds out that his client is merely using Kessler as a stalking horse to bring another company back into the negotiations. Harvey wants to team up with Alex to make the other company back out, but Donna learns about what's going on and can not help but tell Thomas when she finds out he is about to reject a better deal in favor of the officious agreement. During a fight about her losing faith in him, Harvey and Donna are surprised by Daniel Hardman, who was hired by Harvey's now-former client to sue the firm for breaking privilege. Samantha draws from her own experience to help Louis deal with his attacker when the man is set free in court, but her tactics worry Robert. Meanwhile, Katrina gets pulled into Brian's solo case and an uncharacteristic move of hers makes Brian realizes he cannot turn off his feelings for her, causing him to resign from the firm.
124	16	"Harvey"	Christopher Misiano	Aaron Korsh & Genevieve Sparling & Ethan Drogin	February 27, 2019	0.74
Hardman wants to remove Harvey's license and return to the firm. Robert plans to put Hardman's name on the building of his previous firm, but is asked by a former partner to retire to make that happen. Harvey insists to Thomas the blame resides with him, not Donna, which makes Thomas question their relationship. Donna admits that she wants to cut Harvey out of her life but is not sure if she will be able to. In the past, Robert went against Samantha's wishes and sent her mugger to prison, where he was murdered. His death has haunted Robert since, and subsequently decides to back his friend, concocting a plan that saves Harvey at the Ethics Hearing, but makes Robert lose his law license. Samantha communicates the loss of love to Harvey, which enables him to realize his feelings for Donna, and he rushes to passionately kiss her.

== Production ==
=== Development ===
On May 25, 2018, Entertainment Weekly released an interview with Katherine Heigl in which she described her character Samantha Wheeler as a "fierce and enigmatic lawyer who muscles her way into [the] central law firm, Zane Specter Litt." She also teased an antagonistic relationship between Samantha and the main protagonist Harvey Specter and an "uneasy dynamic" with Donna. The article included several exclusive first-look images from the season premiere and Heigl's character.

Series creator Aaron Korsh confirmed that Patrick J. Adams will not be returning for any guest appearances in the first ten episodes of the season. However, he did state that he and Adams had discussed it and are both open to the possibility somewhere in the future. At the same time, he confirmed that Gina Torres will not guest star on the eighth season nor will there be crossover episodes in order to establish the world from the Chicago-based spin-off series Pearson as separate from Suits itself.

== Ratings ==
Viewership and ratings per episode of Suits season 8
No.	Title	Air date	Rating (18–49)	Viewers (millions)	DVR (18–49)	DVR viewers (millions)	Total (18–49)	Total viewers (millions)
1	"Right-Hand Man"	July 18, 2018	0.3	1.27	0.3	1.23	0.6	2.50
2	"Pecking Order"	July 25, 2018	0.2	1.18	0.3	1.21	0.5	2.39
3	"Promises, Promises"	August 1, 2018	0.2	1.16	0.2	0.81	0.4	1.97 (Note: Live +7 ratings were not available, so Live +3 ratings have been used instead.)
4	"Revenue Per Square Foot"	August 8, 2018	0.3	1.09	0.2	0.87	0.5	1.96
5	"Good Mudding"	August 15, 2018	0.3	1.15	—N/a	1.21	—N/a	2.36
6	"Cats, Ballet, Harvey Specter"	August 22, 2018	0.3	1.22	0.2	0.87	0.5	2.10
7	"Sour Grapes"	August 29, 2018	0.2	1.13	0.4	1.26	0.6	2.40
8	"Coral Gables"	September 5, 2018	0.3	1.30	—N/a	1.21	—N/a	2.51
9	"Motion to Delay"	September 12, 2018	0.3	1.07	—N/a	1.25	—N/a	2.32
10	"Managing Partner"	September 19, 2018	0.3	1.08	0.2	1.02	0.5	2.10
11	"Rocky 8"	January 23, 2019	0.3	0.82	0.3	1.49	0.6	2.32
12	"Whale Hunt"	January 30, 2019	0.2	0.91	0.3	1.43	0.5	2.34
13	"The Greater Good"	February 6, 2019	0.2	0.77	0.2	1.05	0.4	1.82
14	"Peas in a Pod"	February 13, 2019	0.2	0.78	0.3	1.41	0.5	2.19
15	"Stalking Horse"	February 20, 2019	0.2	0.69	0.3	1.34	0.5	2.03
16	"Harvey"	February 27, 2019	0.2	0.74	0.3	1.31	0.5	2.05
