= Suits season 5 =

Suits
- Season 5
- DVD cover
- Starring: Gabriel Macht; Patrick J. Adams; Rick Hoffman; Meghan Markle; Sarah Rafferty; Gina Torres
- No. of episodes: 16

Release
- Original network: USA Network
- Original release: June 24, 2015 – March 2, 2016

Season chronology
- ← Previous; Season 4 Next → Season 6

The fifth season of the American legal comedy-drama Suits was ordered on August 11, 2014. The fifth season originally aired on USA Network in the United States between June 24, 2015 and March 2, 2016. The season was produced by Hypnotic Films & Television and Universal Cable Productions, and the executive producers were Doug Liman, David Bartis and series creator Aaron Korsh. The season had six series regulars playing employees at the fictional Pearson Specter Litt law firm in Manhattan: Gabriel Macht, Patrick J. Adams, Rick Hoffman, Meghan Markle, Sarah Rafferty, and Gina Torres.

== Overview ==
The series revolves around corporate lawyer Harvey Specter and his associate attorney Mike Ross, the latter practicing without a law degree.

== Cast ==
=== Regular cast ===
- Gabriel Macht as Harvey Specter
- Patrick J. Adams as Mike Ross
- Rick Hoffman as Louis Litt
- Meghan Markle as Rachel Zane
- Sarah Rafferty as Donna Paulsen
- Gina Torres as Jessica Pearson

=== Special guest cast ===
- David Costabile as Daniel Hardman

=== Recurring cast ===
- Wendell Pierce as Robert Zane
- Eric Roberts as Charles Forstman
- Amanda Schull as Katrina Bennett
- Rachael Harris as Sheila Sazs
- Leslie Hope as Anita Gibbs
- John Pyper-Ferguson as Jack Soloff
- Farid Yazdani as David Green
- Christina Cole as Dr. Paula Agard

=== Guest cast ===
- Megan Gallagher as Laura Zane

Six actors received star billing in the show's first season. Each character works at the fictional Pearson Specter Litt law firm in Manhattan. Gabriel Macht plays corporate lawyer Harvey Specter, who is promoted to senior partner and is forced to hire an associate attorney. Patrick J. Adams plays college dropout Mike Ross, who wins the associate position with his eidetic memory and genuine desire to be a good lawyer. Rick Hoffman plays Louis Litt, Harvey's jealous rival and the direct supervisor of the firm's first-year associates. Meghan Markle plays Rachel Zane, a paralegal who aspires to be an attorney but her test anxiety prevents her from attending Harvard Law School. Sarah Rafferty plays Donna Paulsen, Harvey's long-time legal secretary and confidant. Gina Torres plays Jessica Pearson, the co-founder and managing partner of the firm.

== Episodes ==
No. overall	No. in season	Title	Directed by	Written by	Original release date	U.S. viewers (millions)
61	1	"Denial"	Anton Cropper	Aaron Korsh	June 24, 2015	2.13
Harvey finds it difficult to adjust to work without Donna, while Donna has a difficult time handling Louis' paranoia that she's certain to return to Harvey. Harvey has started getting panic attacks and he starts therapy with Dr. Paula Agard. Mike and Rachel must decide how and when to share their big news, and ambitious senior partner Jack Soloff, head of the compensation committee, begins to threaten trouble over Harvey's favored position with Jessica and in the firm.
62	2	"Compensation"	Michael Smith	Rick Muirragui	July 1, 2015	2.27
Harvey appoints a replacement for Donna while Mike takes on a case as a favor. Rachel's father urges her to sign a prenup, which she takes as an affront. Louis finds out how much Donna makes and that Harvey has been paying her salary. He goes to great lengths to cover the amount.
63	3	"No Refills"	Anton Cropper	Chris Downey	July 8, 2015	2.16
Mike brings Robert Zane in as co-counsel on his class action case, and Zane immediately begins treating him as inferior, and makes decisions without Mike knowing. Meanwhile, Jessica wants Harvey to play nice with Jack to blunt his growing influence, but Jack is not interested in Harvey's attempts. Harvey and Jessica go on the offensive against Jack. Jack coerces Louis to help him. Harvey continues to struggle post-Donna. Gretchen continues to do an admirable job as Harvey's new legal secretary. Mike ultimately gains Robert's respect after he uses his photographic memory to get the Judge to agree with them to expedite the case.
64	4	"No Puedo Hacerlo"	Silver Tree	Genevieve Sparling	July 15, 2015	2.38
Louis asks Harvey to help his sister, Esther, handle her divorce; Harvey promises that he will not pursue Esther romantically. Mike and Zane work their class action case together, but Mike learns they have different ideas about what constitutes a win. Harvey secures Esther a good deal in her divorce, but then breaks his promise to Louis by spending the night with her.
65	5	"Toe to Toe"	Kevin Bray	Nora Zuckerman & Lilla Zuckerman	July 22, 2015	2.09
In a session with his therapist, Harvey talks about a dream in which he finds Donna and his returning nemesis, Travis Tanner, sleeping together. This reflects the difficulty he has in dealing objectively with a case in which Tanner is opposing counsel, and Mike must try to get both sides to agree.
66	6	"Privilege"	Michael Smith	Kyle Long	July 29, 2015	2.16
Reeling from Dr. Agard’s revelation about the root of his panic attacks, Harvey is forced to make a tough personal decision in a case that touches a nerve. Meanwhile, Mike and Louis have taken over responsibility for Harvey’s oldest client, and must decide what to do when that client’s demands go against his own best interests. When Rachel expresses her wish to be married at the Plaza Hotel on her birthday but the venue is already booked, Donna steps in to help.
67	7	"Hitting Home"	Roger Kumble	Sharyn Rothstein	August 5, 2015	2.08
At Jessica’s behest, Jack approaches Mike to be co-counsel on a case; what begins as an attempt to fake a reconciliation ends with Jack coming to genuinely respect Mike, and he nominates him for junior partner. Esther Litt returns to Harvey when her business is threatened with a lawsuit, but he sends her to Louis instead; Louis' defense threatens both his relationship with Esther and to expose her dalliance with Harvey. Donna tries to keep the peace between them, but Louis finds out about Esther and Harvey and angrily confronts him about it, which ends with Harvey physically assaulting Louis. Jessica orders Mike to find a way to refuse Jack's nomination.
68	8	"Mea Culpa"	Kate Dennis	Daniel Arkin	August 12, 2015	2.31
Jessica does damage control in the wake of Harvey punching Louis, while Jack Soloff and Daniel Hardman are looking for weaknesses to exploit. Mike tries to think of a way to turn down his partnership, but Jessica changes her mind and allows it. After luring Harvey to the meeting under the pretext of voting on Mike's partnership, Louis tries to unilaterally suspend Harvey for the assault; Jack intervenes, citing the bylaws which state that such an action requires the approval of the partners. Mike's first case as junior partner leads to disaster when opposing counsel turns out to be someone from his past, and Rachel must quickly step in to protect him.
69	9	"Uninvited Guests"	Silver Tree	Chris Downey	August 19, 2015	2.30
Rachel and her mother plan for the wedding, but Rachel worries that the event could reveal Mike’s secret; her insistence on a small wedding without an announcement rouses her mother's suspicions. Daniel Hardman and Jack Soloff make their move against Jessica and the partners, as Jack announces that Hardman has a client that would bring the firm, and its partners, hundreds of millions of dollars. Louis deduces that Hardman has some kind of leverage over Jack, but cannot find out what it is; Harvey discovers that Hardman is backed by Charles Forstman and confronts Forstman, who says he'll cut off Hardman's funds if Harvey resigns from the firm. Rachel's mother confronts Mike alone; Mike deflects her concerns, but begins to feel guilty about how much Rachel is sacrificing.
70	10	"Faith"	Anton Cropper	Genevieve Sparling	August 26, 2015	2.34
With their backs against the wall, Jessica and Louis make a last-ditch effort to rally the support of the partners. Mike and Harvey must each face down the demons of their past in order to make potentially life-altering decisions. At the leadership vote, Harvey announces that Daniel Hardman has lost his funding, and Jessica wins unanimously, save Jack; later, Harvey reveals to Jessica that he's resigning, keeping his end of the bargain with Forstman. At the same time, Mike gives Harvey his own letter of resignation, wanting to marry Rachel with a clean slate, but shortly afterwards he is arrested by federal agents.
71	11	"Blowback"	Cherie Nowlan	Nora Zuckerman & Lilla Zuckerman	January 27, 2016	1.74
Ruthless US Attorney Anita Gibbs (Leslie Hope) takes Mike in for questioning, and refuses him access to a lawyer until he forces a taped statement regarding his denial of rights. A panicked Rachel calls her father Robert for support, inadvertently proving to him that Mike is a fraud, causing a rift between Robert and Rachel. Harvey, who wants to represent Mike, is torn between keeping Hardman and Soloff at bay and keeping appearances up against Gibbs at the firm. Harvey leverages Mike's resignation letter for bail, while Mike uses his ability to bring forth conspiracy charges to force Soloff to back down. Louis attempts to shield Donna from prosecution, but when she refuses to stand aside, Louis allows her and Harvey to reunite.
72	12	"Live to Fight…"	Rob Seidenglanz	Sharyn Rothstein	February 3, 2016	1.51
Mike and Louis discover that it was Sheila Sazs who reported Mike to the authorities after Louis recognises the wording and language in the anonymous email (sent from a general Harvard Faculty address) as hers. He pays her a visit at her home and asks Sheila to retract her email. While she refuses, she agrees not to come forward as the person who wrote the email, meaning that it cannot be used as evidence. She informs Louis that she was reading a journal article about Mike's promotion to Junior Partner when she realised that Mike had no paper-file in her file room and was likely a fraud. Meanwhile, Gibbs detains Donna's father in an attempt to get Donna to turn on Harvey. Mike goes to visit Professor Gerard and obtains a vague letter from him implying that Mike was in his ethics class at Harvard Law. Gibbs agrees to release Donna's father, provided that Harvey and Mike won't use Gerard's letter in the case. Gretchen informs Louis that she was the one who called the publishers of the journal to have the article written, but that she's supporting Pearson Specter Litt.
73	13	"God's Green Earth"	Anton Cropper	Genevieve Sparling & Sandra Silverstein	February 10, 2016	1.71
Anita Gibbs lures Rachel into a conversation by making everything said during their meeting inadmissible, then threatens Rachel's dreams of a law career unless she turns on the firm. Harvey, after confronting Gibbs about talking to Rachel, hears Gibbs say "God's green earth," thereby deducing that she wrote the New York Journal op-ed that greatly hurt the Pearson Specter Litt reputation. Louis puts pressure on Sheila and sends her on a "vacation" to Argentina. Donna, while looking through Gibbs' documents, discovers that Trevor talked to Gibbs.
74	14	"Self Defense"	Patrick J. Adams	Kyle Long	February 17, 2016	1.58
As time runs out before the trial, Mike wants to represent himself while Harvey wants to lead the charge. To decide the issue, Harvey challenges Mike to a winner takes all showdown.
75	15	"Tick Tock"	Roger Kumble	Daniel Arkin	February 24, 2016	1.73
The jury comes back but, before the outcome is announced, Mike decides to take up Anita Gibbs on one of her deals. Which one is not mentioned, but Harvey is shown racing to Gibbs' office to try and stop Mike.
76	16	"25th Hour"	Anton Cropper	Aaron Korsh	March 2, 2016	1.71
Mike takes the prison deal that Anita Gibbs offered him, provided she doesn't go after Harvey or any of the other partners at Pearson Specter Litt. Harvey tracks down the foreman of the jury to know what the verdict was going to be. He learns that Mike was found not guilty, but chooses not to tell Mike the truth, thereby saving him the pain of knowing he made the wrong decision. Mike & Rachel decide to get married the following day, but Mike refuses to marry her in the end, telling her that, if she wants to, they can revisit it when he gets out. Meanwhile, Harvey tries to find a way to nullify the deal Mike made with Anita Gibbs, but fails. He then decides to hand over the case files for Liberty Rail, telling Gibbs that she can prosecute a murderer in exchange for Mike not going to prison. Gibbs rejects the proposal, saying Harvey should do the right thing and get the case prosecuted anyway instead of using it as a bargaining chip. Jessica, Louis, and Donna return to the office the next day and find that all the employees are gone. In the last scene, Mike is seen entering the prison gate.

== Ratings ==
No.	Title	Original air date	Time slot (EST)	Viewers (in millions)	Rating (Adults 18–49)	18-49 Rank on Cable	Note
1	"Denial"	June 24, 2015	Thursdays; 9:00 p.m.	2.13	0.6	#2	
2	"Compensation"	July 1, 2015	Thursdays; 9:00 p.m.	2.27	0.6	#3	
3	"No Refills"	July 8, 2015	Thursdays; 9:00 p.m.	2.16	0.6	#5	
4	"No Puedo Hacerlo"	July 15, 2015	Thursdays; 9:00 p.m.	2.38	0.6	#2	
5	"Toe to Toe"	July 22, 2015	Thursdays; 9:00 p.m.	2.09	0.6	#4	
6	"Privilege"	July 29, 2015	Thursdays; 9:00 p.m.	2.16	0.5	#5	
7	"Hitting Home"	August 5, 2015	Thursdays; 9:00 p.m.	2.08	0.6	#6	
8	"Mea Culpa"	August 12, 2015	Thursdays; 9:00 p.m.	2.31	0.7	#2	
9	"Uninvited Guests"	August 19, 2015	Thursdays; 9:00 p.m.	2.30	0.6	#2	
10	"Faith"	August 26, 2015	Thursdays; 9:00 p.m.	2.34	0.6	#2	
11	"Blowback"	January 27, 2016	Thursdays; 9:00 p.m.	1.74	0.5	#8	
12	"Live to Fight"	February 3, 2016	Thursdays; 9:00 p.m.	1.51	0.5	#12	
13	"God's Green Earth"	February 10, 2016	Thursdays; 9:00 p.m.	1.71	0.5	#8	
14	"Self Defense"	February 17, 2016	Thursdays; 9:00 p.m.	1.58	0.5	#12	
15	"Tick Tock"	February 24, 2016	Thursdays; 9:00 p.m.	1.73	0.5	#7	
16	"25th Hour"	March 2, 2016	Thursdays; 9:00 p.m.	1.71	0.5	#7	
