= Not Just a Pretty Face =

Not Just a Pretty Face may refer to:

- Not Just a Pretty Face (Dustin album), an album by Dustin the Turkey
- Not Just a Pretty Face (Rowan Atkinson album), a comedy album by Rowan Atkinson
- "Not Just a Pretty Face", a Season 4 episode of Suits
- Not Just a Pretty Face (TV show) A Hong Kong drama released in 2003.
