= Louis Litt =

Fictional character in the television series Suits

- Suits character
- Rick Hoffman as Louis Litt
- First appearance: "Pilot" (2011)
- Last appearance: Suits (2019); "One Last Con"; Suits LA (2025); "Angry Sylvester"
- Created by: Aaron Korsh
- Portrayed by: Rick Hoffman

In-universe information
- Full name: Louis Marlowe Litt
- Gender: Male
- Occupation: Lawyer
- Family: Esther Litts (sister)
- Spouses: Sheila Sazs
- Nationality: American
- Positions: Partner of Pearson Specter Litt
- Location: 601 East 59th St., New York City, U.S. (Note: According to address wrote on envelopes of letters sent to Mikado, as visible in season 3, episode 9 "Bad Faith".)
- Alma mater: Harvard Law School

Louis Marlowe Litt J.D., Esq. is a fictional character from the USA Network legal drama television series Suits. Louis is widely known for his rivalry with Harvey Specter (Gabriel Macht) and his effort to earn the respect of the other partners, which is the central role in his character throughout the series. The character was created by Aaron Korsh and portrayed by Rick Hoffman.

Introduced as a lawyer at the New York law firm Pearson Hardman, which later changes names several times during the series, including Pearson Specter Litt. Over the course of the show, he becomes a named partner and eventually helps lead the firm. He appears throughout the nine seasons of Suits. Hoffman later reprised the role in the 2025 spinoff series Suits LA, where the character appears several years after the events of the original show.

Louis was named one of the best comic-relief characters in dramas by The Must List: Ranking the Best in 25 Years of Pop Culture.

== Fictional character biography ==
Louis Marlowe Litt was born and raised in Scarsdale, New York. He was home-schooled until the age of ten and later attended high school, where he took part in activities. He studied at Harvard Law School, where he earned a law degree and graduated with the Order of the Coif.

Before the events of the series, Louis worked as a senior associate at Pearson Hardman. In 2003, Harvey joined the firm after leaving the district attorney's office. Louis and Harvey were later promoted to junior partners. Their professional rivalry began after Louis secretly leaked Harvey's legal strategy in a case involving McKernon Motors in order to gain favor with managing partner Daniel Hardman. Louis is Jewish and occasionally refers to his faith and traditions. As a junior partner he worked with his longtime secretary Norma, though their relationship was often tense. At one point he was accused of stealing from the firm, but it was later revealed that Daniel had framed him in order to hide his own misconduct.

== Appearances ==
=== Season 1 and 2 ===
Louis was a lawyer and senior associate at Pearson Hardman. In the early episodes, he tells Jessica Pearson (Gina Torres) about a problem with the client Gerald Tate (John Bedford Lloyd) and is instructed to bring in Harvey. On Mike Ross' (Patrick J. Adams) first day, Louis fires an associate in front of him and tests Mike by forcing him to take a drug test. He also takes Mike to meet client Tom Keller, despite Mike being unwilling, and uses that situation to try to assert his authority.

Louis attempts to gain a closer relationship with Donna Paulsen (Sarah Rafferty), though his efforts are sometimes awkward. Throughout the season, Louis works to cement his reputation within the firm.

Louis is promoted to senior partner under Daniel Hardman (David Costabile), who can secure Louis' vote. Louis initially supports Daniel and even acts against Harvey, Mike, and Jessica to gain favour. When Harvey uncovers evidence that Daniel stole from the firm and tried to set Louis up to take the blame, Louis confronts both Daniel and Jessica. He eventually realises Daniel does not have the firm's best interests at heart. At a partners meeting, Louis votes for Daniel to be removed from control of the firm, helping restore trust in Jessica's leadership.

=== Season 3 and 4 ===
Louis discovers that Mike Ross never attended Harvard Law School. He searches the Harvard file room for Mike's records and later obtains a forged transcript showing an "A+" in Professor Henry Gerard's class, which fuels his suspicions. Louis confronts Mike in the firm bathroom and threatens to expose him. During a court proceeding, Louis suffers a minor heart attack and is taken to hospital. In the hospital, he proposes to Sheila Sazs (Rachael Harris) though their engagement later ends as they want different things in life. Louis feels betrayed by Mike and hurt over his personal life.

Louis resigns from Pearson Specter because he does not want to put Harvey or other partners in a position to fire him. Earlier, he made an illegal deal with Charles Forstman (Eric Roberts) and wired firm money overseas, which could have exposed the firm to legal trouble. Louis definitively realises that Mike never went to Harvard when he notices the Order of the Coif recognition and other inconsistencies in Mike's records. Louis loses his composure but eventually returns to help secure his place as name partner at Pearson Specter. He signs an affidavit acknowledging his involvement in hiring a fraud so his name can be added to the firm wall.

=== Season 5 and 6 ===
Louis deals with the fallout of Mike's fraud. He remains working at Pearson Specter and manages conflicts and tensions among the partners during the ongoing crisis. Louis' sister Esther Litt (Amy Acker) returns with a legal problem that requires firm support, and Louis becomes involved in managing that case alongside his usual duties.

After Mike is arrested for practising law without a degree, and the firm faces disruption. Louis works alongside Harvey and the other partners to keep the firm steady and protect its clients, also focuses on managing daily works, including legal and financial matters.

=== Season 7 and 8 ===
After Jessica leaves the firm to work in Chicago, Louis stays on as a senior partner at Pearson Specter. He joins the other partners in making decisions about the firm's direction and works closely with associates to keep the company running smoothly during her absence.

Louis and Harvey try to keep the company stable after another public relations setback. They invite Robert Zane (Wendell Pierce) to join the firm as a name partner and bring lawyers from his firm with him. Robert uses the merger to negotiate control and becomes managing partner. At the same time, Louis and Sheila believe she is pregnant after a test result, but it later turns out to be a false positive. They visit a fertility doctor whom Louis recognizes, and after speaking with Dr. Lipschitz, Louis decides to move past the situation.

Conflict also grows between Samantha Wheeler (Katherine Heigl) and Alex Williams (Dulé Hill) as both compete to become name partner. Harvey and Robert place them on opposite sides of a case, which intensifies their rivalry. After a dispute over the promotion, Donna urges Louis to take control of the firm. Louis runs for managing partner and wins the vote. His first decision is to promote both Samantha and Alex to name partner at the same time.

=== Season 9 ===
Louis faces challenges after Robert was disbarred. He writes a firm statement about the situation and works to retain Zane's clients. Louis disagrees with Harvey and Donna while trying to maintain the firm's reputation. The New York State Bar assigns Faye Richardson as Special Master, giving her authority over the firm. Louis and the partners must follow her directives to avoid suspension.

Saul Zuckerman (Marvin Kaye) offers Louis a judgeship, but he initially turns it down, showing he does not want to leave the firm. Louis works with the partners, staff, and Faye Richardson as they deal with the situation at the office, while Sheila continues to support him and offer advice.

=== Other appearances ===
Louis appears in the final episode of the first season of Suits LA. He attends an hostility mitigation (anger management) retreat and initially clashes with criminal defense lawyer Stuart Lane. They eventually bond over their similar temperaments and take part in retreat activities, including a mud bath. Louis shares personal reflections and engages in familiar activities, including a mud bath with Stuart, before the story concludes with them forming a friendly connection.

== Development ==
=== Concept and creation ===
Series creator Aaron Korsh wrote Louis as a lawyer who is talented but often insecure about his position at the firm. His rivalry with Harvey and his desire to gain recognition from the other partners form an important part of the character's role in the series. Louis appears as a main character throughout the nine seasons of Suits. Several episodes also explore his personal life. In one episode his parents appear, real-life parents in guest roles.

In Season 4, Louis' resignation letter that ended with "Please take care of my home", was initially performed without the emotional weight the writers intended. According to a TV Guide report, Korsh said the idea of Louis reading the letter in his own voice was meant to be moving and a strong beat for the character's journey. To achieve this impact, the emotional tone of the reading was emphasized in production so that the farewell would resonate as a key turning point for Louis and his connection to the firm's identity as his "home".

=== Casting ===
Louis Litt is portrayed by actor Rick Hoffman. The role became one of Hoffman's best-known television performances during the run of Suits. Hoffman later returned to play the character again in the spinoff series Suits LA. In the final episode of season one, Louis attends a hostility mitigation retreat where he meets another lawyer named Stuart Lane. The two begin with an argument but later realize they share similar frustrations with their law firm partners. Reports confirmed that Louis' appearance was part of a series of guest returns by characters from the original show.

== Characterization ==
=== Personality ===
Louis often comes across as cruel, insensitive, and prone to bullying, which makes him difficult to work with. He is described as "complicated" for his intelligence and loyalty are often mixed with jealousy, anger, and strong emotions. The character also became known for dramatic reactions to everyday problems. In Season 3, Louis becomes upset about office supplies after a merger changes the brands he prefers to use.

=== Relationships with colleagues ===
Louis relationships in the series are marked between competition and loyalty. His interactions with his colleagues combine rivalry, humour, and a deep commitment to the firm. Hoffman explained that Louis' relationships with other characters were a major part of what made the show memorable, and that his dynamic with the core cast helped define his role as an important member of the ensemble.

His dynamic with Harvey has been described in press coverage as a "love‑hate" relationship, in which the two characters often personality clash but are nonetheless bound by the necessity of working together when the firm faces adversity. In promotion and crisis situations, Louis and Harvey are shown cooperating to defend the firm's interests, illustrating a complex interplay of rivalry and mutual reliance.

== Reception ==
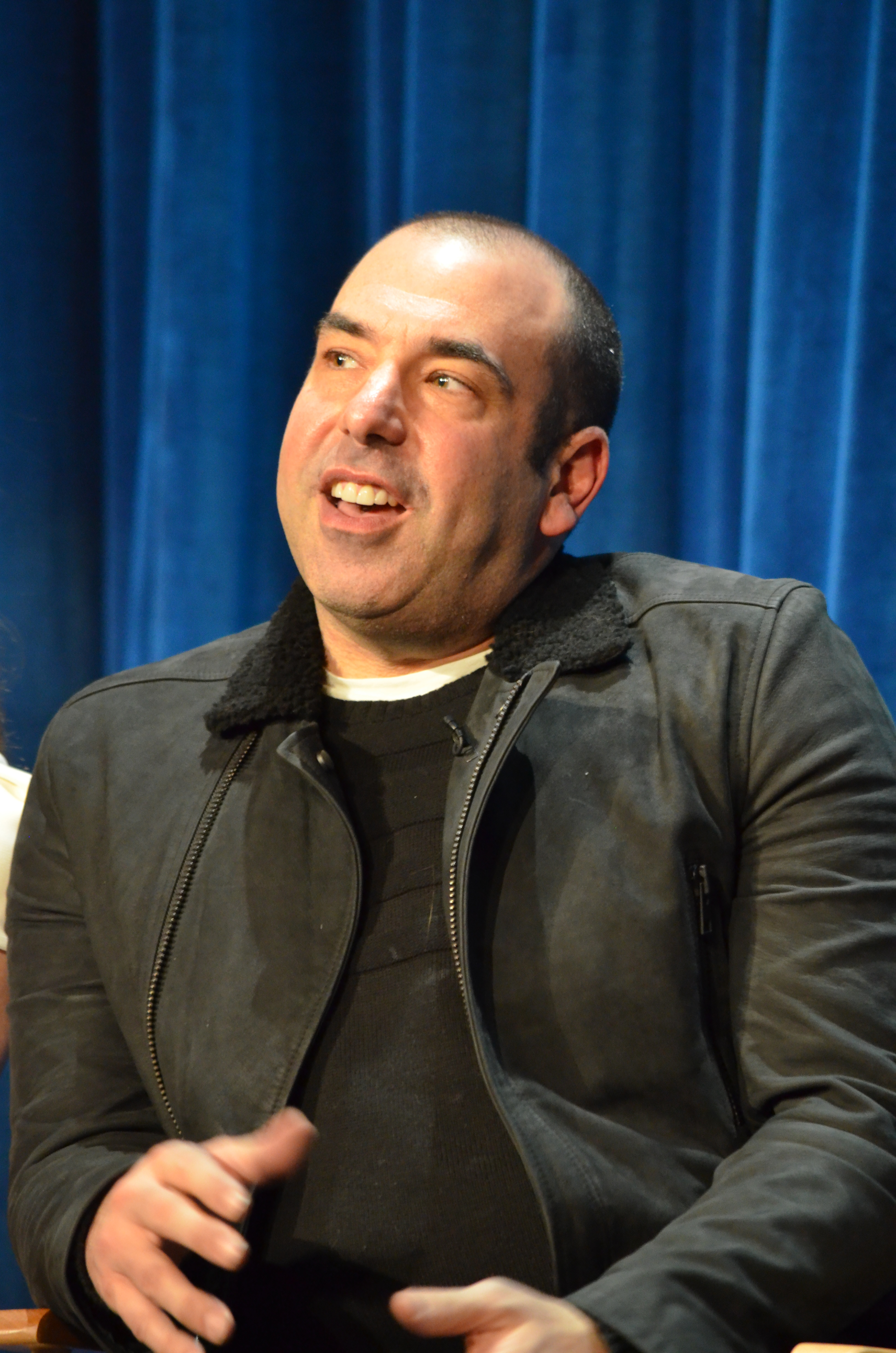
Rick Hoffman's performance as Louis Litt received mixed reviews from critics.

"Louis is a character who is incredibly flawed, but who wants so badly—and tries so hard—to overcome his worst instincts and be a better person that it's easy to forgive him when he fails."

— Lacy Baugher Milas, Paste Magazine

Louis Litt received mixed reviews from critics during the run of the series. Namwene Mukabwa of Collider wrote that the character's cruelty, manipulation, and emotional behavior often created problems within the firm and made him difficult for viewers to support. Soniya Hinduja of MovieWeb described Louis as the legal version of a Shakespearean tragedy. She wrote that his need for validation, respect, and friendship often leads him to lash out at those around him.

Chancellor Agard of Entertainment Weekly wrote that Louis has become "one of the best elements of the series". He described the character as eccentric, endearing, and very flawed, noting that Louis desperately wants to be respected but often undercuts himself in the process. Agard added that this struggle makes Louis one of the most relatable characters on the show and praised the performance, saying it "has a ball" bringing the character to life.

Lacy Baugher Milas of Paste Magazine described Louis as one of the most memorable characters in Suits and wrote that his development across the series became one of the show's strongest character arcs. Jill Sederstrom of NBC discussed Louis being mugged in season eight after the character returned in the spinoff series Suits LA. Tai Gooden of Nerdist also noted Louis' marriage to Sheila Sazs and the birth of their daughter in the series finale.

Hoffman's portrayal of Louis was named among the best comic-relief characters in dramas in The Must List: Ranking the Best in 25 Years of Pop Culture. The character was ranked number 43 on Ranker's list of most awkward TV characters.
