= Pilot (Suits) =

- Suits episode
- Harvey Specter (Gabriel Macht) and Mike Ross (Patrick J. Adams) meet for the first time.
- Episode no.: Season 1 Episode 1
- Directed by: Kevin Bray
- Written by: Aaron Korsh
- Cinematography by: Jim Denault, ASC
- Editing by: Robert Ivison
- Production code: 101-75
- Original air date: June 23, 2011
- Running time: 73 minutes

Guest appearances
- Dagmara Dominczyk as Nancy; Tom Lipinski as Trevor Evans; Vanessa Ray as Jenny; Rebecca Schull as Edith Ross; Kristen Bush as Joanna Webster; John Dossett as Mr. Dockery; Julie Ann Emery as Vanessa; John Bedford Lloyd as Gerald; Matt Servitto as Mr. Hunt's Lawyer; David Wohl as Judge

Episode chronology
← Previous —	Next → "Errors and Omissions"
- Suits (season 1)

"Pilot" is the pilot episode of the American legal comedy-drama Suits, which premiered on USA Network in the United States on June 23, 2011. The episode was written by series creator Aaron Korsh and was directed by Kevin Bray. The series revolves around two lawyers who, between the two of them, have only one law degree.

Harvey Specter (Gabriel Macht) is promoted to senior partner of the Pearson Hardman law firm. To his annoyance, company policy requires he hire a Harvard Law School graduate as his associate attorney. Meanwhile, college dropout Mike Ross (Patrick J. Adams) delivers a suitcase of marijuana for a friend, only to find that the drop is a sting operation. While escaping the police, he mistakenly sits for an interview with Harvey and impresses the attorney with his eidetic memory, encyclopedic knowledge of law, and drive to become a good lawyer. Despite Mike's lack of a law degree, Harvey hires him. On Mike's first day, Harvey must personally handle a pro bono case to keep his promotion. Instead, he has Mike take care of the suit, in which a woman claims her boss sexually harassed her.

The series was originally written as a spec script for a half-hour drama set on Wall Street. Korsh later decided to change the premise because, unlike working on Wall Street, working as a lawyer requires several qualifications. The episode was watched by an estimated 4.64 million viewers and saw a double-digit growth over the January premiere of the network's other legal drama Fairly Legal. However, critical reception was mixed. Some reviewers described the premise as absurd and preposterous and criticized the characters, most notably Harvey. Conversely, others lauded the characters' interactions and the snappy dialogue and praised the series' attempt to make the typical USA formula more grounded and edgy.

== Plot ==
At the Pearson Hardman law firm in Manhattan, Harvey Specter (Gabriel Macht) convinces his client Gerald (John Bedford Lloyd) to sign a deal by lying and telling Gerald that Pearson Hardman has already been paid. Meanwhile, Mike Ross (Patrick J. Adams) is nearly caught taking the LSAT for someone else. Shortly after, his marijuana-dealing friend Trevor (Tom Lipinski) offers him a job: Trevor cannot meet a client and needs someone to deliver some drugs. Mike refuses the job.

In the morning, managing partner Jessica Pearson (Gina Torres) promotes Harvey to senior partner. To his annoyance, company policy requires he hire a Harvard Law School graduate as his associate attorney. His interviews are already set for tomorrow. Mike learns that he cannot afford to keep his grandmother (Rebecca Schull) in a private nursing home. To make the money, he agrees to make the drop for Trevor tomorrow. As Trevor leaves his drug supplier, he overhears that the drop might be a sting operation. The suppliers find Trevor eavesdropping and force him to stay overnight so that he can't warn Mike of the possible set up.

The next day, Harvey finds that none of the interviewees are promising. Mike discovers the set-up and runs into Harvey's interviews to escape the police. He is mistaken for a candidate. When he walks into the interview, the suitcase opens and the marijuana falls out. However, Harvey is impressed with Mike's quick thinking, eidetic memory, and encyclopedic knowledge of law. Mike also displays a drive to become a better lawyer than any Harvard graduate. Despite Mike's lack of a law degree, Harvey hires him. He instructs Mike to stop talking to Trevor and to get rid of the suitcase, which Mike hides in his apartment.

On Mike's first day, Harvey is demoted because Gerald discovered Harvey's lie and fired the firm. Jessica threatens to have him disbarred if he steps out of line again. Harvey immediately fires Mike, but rehires him when Mike threatens to tell the truth. Harvey then demands that Jessica return his senior partnership. If she does not, he will tell the ethics board that Jessica did not fulfill her duty to report misconduct. She returns his promotion on the condition that he personally handles a pro bono case. He reluctantly accepts, but he assigns it to Mike instead. In the suit, Nancy (Dagmara Dominczyk) claims her boss Charles Hunt sexually harassed her and then fired her under false pretenses. Eventually, Mike is able to convince former employee Joanna Webster (Kristen Bush) to testify.

One night, Mike finds that Trevor ransacked his apartment while looking for the suitcase. Mike takes the suitcase to work the next morning and locks it in his desk. Louis Litt (Rick Hoffman), Harvey's rival and the associates' supervisor, has Mike drug tested and reveals that he is suspicious of Mike's Harvard credentials. That afternoon, Joanna's deposition does not go well and she refuses to testify in court. Mike quits his job and tells Harvey that, on his first day, Louis fired Gary Lipski and threatened to fire Mike if he makes a mistake. However, Harvey says quitting has nothing to do with Louis; Harvey knows Mike had the suitcase in his desk and accuses Mike of having "one foot out the door." Later, Harvey confronts Louis about Lipski. However, Lipski works in the mailroom and was never fired. With this revelation, Harvey realizes that Joanna never worked for Hunt. He convinces her to confess the truth.

Mike gives Trevor the suitcase, but as payback, he exposes Trevor's drug-dealing business to Trevor's girlfriend Jenny (Vanessa Ray). In the morning, Harvey is happy to hear that Mike no longer has the suitcase. At the hearing, Mike and Harvey threaten to charge Hunt with witness tampering unless he agrees to a settlement. As Harvey and Mike leave the courtroom, Harvey presents Mike with his next case.

== Production ==
=== Pre-production ===
On April 5, 2010, USA announced that it was developing seven new pilots for its 2010–2011 television season, including A Legal Mind, which would later become Suits. The premiere was written by Aaron Korsh, and David Bartis and Gene Klein served as executive producers. It was later announced on May 17, 2010 that USA ordered a ninety-minute cast-contingent pilot for the series. The network later picked up A Legal Mind on January 19, 2011 and ordered eleven one-hour episodes in addition to the 90-minute pilot.

=== Conception ===
Creator Aaron Korsh, whose Notes from the Underbelly sitcom was canceled during the 2007–2008 Writers' Strike, wrote a spec script intended to be a "half-hour Entourage-type based on my experiences working on Wall Street." He later realized that the project should have hour-long episodes. Korsh and his agent took the script to several production companies and wanted to give the script to Universal Media Studios. However, Korsh found it odd that the studio did not want to sell the script to NBC, the network the studio typically worked with. Korsh's agent convinced USA Network executive Alex Sepiol that although the series was neither a procedural nor what the network typically did, he would like the characters. Sepiol approved of the script, and by then, Hypnotic Films & Television signed on to the project. The team pitched the script to USA, which bought the script after the pitch. Korsh did not pitch it to anyone else. When rewriting the script, Korsh made only small changes to the first half-hour, up to when Mike is hired. Originally, Mike did not take LSATs for others and only pretends to have attended Harvard, as opposed to pretending he attended Harvard and has a law degree. Korsh noted that there is no degree or test needed to work on Wall Street and be a mathematical genius, unlike the bar examination in law. He decided to "embrace" this difference and change the premise.

=== Casting ===
The series stars six cast members. On July 7, 2010, Patrick J. Adams was the first actor to be cast and was given the role of Mike Ross, a college dropout pretending to be a Harvard graduate. Gabriel Macht was cast as corporate lawyer Harvey Specter on July 26, and on August 8, Rick Hoffman joined the series as Harvey's jealous rival Louis Litt. On August 24, Meghan Markle and Gina Torres were cast as paralegal Rachel Lane and senior partner Katherine Pearson, respectively; the characters were later renamed Rachel Zane and Jessica Pearson. Sarah Rafferty rounded off the main cast as Donna Paulsen, Harvey's assistant.

=== Filming ===
The episode was filmed in New York City, where the series is set, and is the only episode to be filmed on location. The rest of the series is filmed in Toronto, where the sets are built to be identical to the New York law offices seen in the pilot.

== Release ==
=== Promotion ===
To promote the series debut, USA had an advance screening of the pilot on June 2, 2011 at the Hudson River Park and distributed free Häagen-Dazs Sundaes cones at the viewing. The network also had branded ice cream carts, bikes, and scooters give away the Sundaes and USA/Entertainment Weekly 2011 promotion summer guides on June 22 and June 23 in New York, Los Angeles, Chicago, San Francisco, and Boston to promote the pilot.

=== Ratings ===
"Pilot" originally aired on USA Network on June 23, 2011 at 10:00 pm after Burn Notice. The series debuted to an estimated 4.64 million viewers and received a 1.6 rating among adults aged 18 to 49. The episode was watched by an estimated 2 million people aged 18 to and 49 and by about 2.1 million people aged 25 to 54, a double-digit growth over the January premiere of network's other legal drama Fairly Legal. The pilot ranked number nine in the top viewed basic cable shows for that week.

=== Critical reception ===
Critical reception to the pilot episode was mixed. Ginia Bellafante, writing for The New York Times, stated that the series "erupts from a Mount Vesuvius of absurdities" and described the plot as preposterous. She pointed out that the episode, like so many other USA series she described as "forged seemingly on creative autopilot", ignores all the negatives and only portrays the positive in an attempt to "appeal to the fantasy of second chances and sexy opportunities." However, she said that the series comes in "relatively good faith." She felt that the episode was amusing at its start, but it "quickly descends into cloying buddy escapade." Diane Wertis of Newsday gave the episode 4 out of 5 stars, but she conceded that viewers must not think "too hard" about the premise or the fact that the other characters have not figured out Mike is not a lawyer. However, she praises the series' effort to delve deeper than the usual USA series. She also praises the dialogue, stating that the characters are "whipping banter around the office like racquetball champs", and hopes that the series will go deeper into the characters. The Futon Critic's Brian Ford Sullivan felt that the episode moves slowly as the lead characters do not meet until twenty minutes into the episode and the episodes main storyline does not appear until ten minutes after that. He said that the first twenty minutes before Mike and Harvey's first meeting feels like "extraneous origin story" and even when those plot points are reincorporated into the plot they are "tangential and distracting." He described the premise as "the-less-you-think-about-it-the-better" and agreed that the premise was "improbable." However, he felt that once the episode reaches the series' true premise, "there's plenty of sparks to go around." He praises the "amusing back and forth" between Harvey and Mike and likes the inversion of the good guy and bad guy are forced to work together trope. He stated that it is difficult to not be charmed by both the characters and the show.

David Hinckley of the Daily News rated the episode 3 of 5 stars and stated that the episode "stretch[es] credibility until it screams for mercy" and notes that the casework in the episode mostly serves as a means to allow Harvey to declare his lack of personal investment in his clients. He commented that a future relationship between either Mike and Rachel or Mike and Jenny is not difficult to predict. However, Hinckley said that the series is worthwhile if the viewers could get past the premise. He also praises the amount of "character fodder" and described the dialogue as "snappy with a pop-culture flavor." Brian Lowry at Variety stated that the series "weaves together elements of White Collar, Fairly Legal and Psych." However, he said that the series' shortcomings stem from "the dangers of buying concepts off the rack." He felt that although Mike is humanized by his youth and financial need, Harvey comes across as "a swaggering ass", a handicap not even the characters' playful banter can overcome. He also stated that the supporting cast are accessories to primary characters that are not colorful and stated that it is difficult to "get too excited about a couple of empty suits." Rob Owen of the Pittsburgh Post-Gazette compared the series to TNT's Franklin & Bash and said that Suits fares better as it is more realistic and is more grounded in reality. He commented that the series' appeal comes from its "snappy banter." He felt that Adams made a "winning impression" and Mike's character serves as a balance to Harvey's.

Robert Bianco of USA Today praises USA's effort to move into a more grounded and edgy version of its formula. However, he criticizes the series as "misguided" and "ludicrous, ill-cast and ill-conceived, with a premise that's idiotic even in a medium used to skimming past idiotic premises." He also commented that the cases were not compelling enough to make him overlook the series' structural flaws and said that there was little in Suits that cannot be found in other legal dramas. He had trouble believing that Harvey would take such a risk or that Mike is even worth the risk. He also lamented the fact that Hoffman was cast as "annoying-worm nemesis." The San Francisco Chronicle's David Wiegand is unsurprised that USA's new show involved a character pretended something he is not. He describes the concept as "nonsensical" and impossible. Although he felt that the case had unexpected twists, he felt that it served more as a plot device than a hook. However, he believed that the show's appeal comes from the relationship between Mike and Harvey and praised the way Adams and Macht played off one another, though he doubted that this alone could sustain the series. Alan Sepinwall of HitFix had a hard time sitting through the episode, which he described as inflated and "a bit much." He stated that the premise is thin and felt that the series is an excuse for "attractive people dressed in nice outfits to banter." He felt that the pilot would have benefited from a shorter run-time and the series would have benefited from more logic and more interaction between Harvey and Mike. Despite this, he noted that the episode had moments where it came close to "clicking", such as Harvey and Mike's first meeting and Harvey amusing hypothetical in a deadpan scene.

Laurel Brown of BuddyTV felt that the series was "too good for summer." Though the premise is familiar, she praised the fact that Mike is not an immediate star and struggles to live up to his smarts. She also praises Harvey for gaining character during his interactions with Donna and Jessica when he was initially entertaining but two-dimensional. She praises the banter and the interactions between all characters and declares that the series is "a truly high-quality piece of television." Matthew Gilbert of The Boston Globe described the series as "light, inoffensive, character-driven, and mostly sunny with a chance of drama." He felt that the series was an "especially neutral venture" and that it was too bland to either like or dislike it. He described the plot twists as contrived and stated that although Mike and Harvey appear to be opposite, it is obvious that Harvey is a goody guy. He stated that the episode was long, elaborate, and "more convoluted than it needs to be."

Nancy deWolf Smith, writing for The Wall Street Journal, said that although the premise is preposterous and the series is similar to other USA series, the characters and the show are able to create a near-sense of drama with glimpses of "bare souls" and stretches without a gag in sight. Matt Fowler of IGN wrote that although the series portrays Harvey and Mike as charismatically mis-matched, he felt that the only difference between them is that "one's a total a-hole and one isn't." He stated that Harvey is only the best lawyer because he "provide[s] a sort of ethereal con-man/people reading expertise that's a writer's dream." He notes that Harvey does not do anything concrete and only wins his promotion because has a certain je ne sais quoi that Louis does not. He felt that Harvey was too cold and arrogant for the viewers to support. He described the Pearson Hardman firm as full of "arrogant pricks and bitter jerks". Fowler also laments the fact that Harvey and Mike are too close in age and that Mike would "vanish completely" if he did not have the semi-romantic scenes with Rachel. In the end, he stated that the episode was not bad but not good and hoped that the series would bring a more interesting dynamic to Harvey and Mike's interactions.
