= Valerie Weiss =

American filmmaker and producer (born 1973)

- Education: Princeton University; Harvard Medical School
- Occupation: Filmmaker; Producer
- Spouse: Robert Johnson
- Website: www.valerieheatherweiss.com

Valerie Heather Weiss is an American filmmaker and producer.

== Early life ==
Valerie Weiss is a filmmaker and scientist. She grew up in Philadelphia, Pennsylvania. She attended Princeton University, where she majored in molecular biology. She got a Ph.D. in biological chemistry and molecular pharmacology and a master's degree in medical sciences from Harvard Medical School. While at Harvard, she founded and was the filmmaker-in-residence and festival director of the Dudley House Film Program, the organization's film program for graduate students from 1999 to 2003. Later she was accepted to the American Film Institute's Directing Workshop for Women, where she made a sci-fi social satire film called Transgressions.

== PhD Productions ==
In 2004 Weiss founded PhD Productions, a film company, with her husband Robert Johnson.

== Personal life ==
Valerie met her future husband Robert Johnson at Princeton as cast members in the production of Cyrano de Bergerac.

== Critical response ==
Weiss directed the "Ad Astra Per Aspera" episode in Season 2 of Star Trek: Strange New Worlds.

Before directing Star Trek: Strange New Worlds, Weiss directed episodes of the first three seasons of Outer Banks (TV series) and her fourth feature film, Mixtape, for Netflix. Mixtape, starring Julie Bowen, Gemma Allen, and Nick Thune received a 100% Fresh score from Rotten Tomatoes as well as being listed as one of the top family films of 2021 by the Washington Post and Common Sense Media.

Weiss has directed Mixtape, a family dramedy about grief, and her third feature, The Archer, a feminist action film about the Kids for Cash scandal in the private prison system. The Archer premiered at the 2017 SXSW Film Festival.

Of Weiss's second feature, A Light Beneath Their Feet, critic John Anderson says in his Thompson on Hollywood Indiewire review, "Not only does director Valerie Weiss's latest effort straddle several genres simultaneously—among them, the coming-of-age drama and the social critique—it also features a pair of break-out performances: Madison Davenport, who plays high-schooler Beth Gerringson; and Taryn Manning ("Orange Is the New Black"), who plays Beth's mother, Gloria ... Manning, under Weiss's direction, puts a spin on Gloria that distinguishes her from similarly unstable characters."

A Light Beneath Their Feet also received a review from The Hollywood Reporter, calling it, "A sensitive and moving depiction of a family dealing with mental illness." "Featuring standout performances by Taryn Manning as a woman with bipolar disorder and Madison Davenport as her teenage daughter grappling with whether to take flight, A Light Beneath Their Feet will strike particular chords among the many who have had similar personal experiences."

Matt Fagerholm of RogerEbert.com called A Light Beneath Their Feet a "triumph of empathetic filmmaking" and said, "Regardless of the genre she happens to be tackling, Valerie Weiss is remarkably gifted at portraying the complexity of human relationships."

== Filmography ==
Director

| Year | Title | Notes |
|---|---|---|
| 2003 | Dance By Design | |
| 2004 | I Love You | |
| 2006 | Transgressions | |
| 2009 | In the Mix | |
| 2011 | Losing Control | |
| 2015 | A Light Beneath Their Feet | |
| 2016 | An American Girl Story – Maryellen 1955: Extraordinary Christmas | |
| 2017 | Chicago P.D. | Episode #93: "Monster" |
| 2017 | The Archer | |
| 2017–2018 | Chicago Med | Episode #37: "Ctrl Alt"; Episode #47: "Ties That Bind"; Episode #69: "Play By My Rules" |
| 2017–2019 | Suits | Episode #98: "Home to Roost"; Episode #113: "Good Mudding"; Episode #120: "Whale Hunt" |
| 2018 | How to Get Away with Murder | Episode #63: "The Baby Was Never Dead" |
| 2018 | Impulse | Episode #6: "In Memoriam" |
| 2018 | Scandal | Episode #119: "Air Force Two" |
| 2018 | The Librarians | Episode #39: "And a Town Called Feud" |
| 2019 | Prodigal Son | Episode #10: "Silent Night" |
| 2019 | Why Women Kill | Episode #4: "You Had Me at Homicide" |
| 2019 | For the People | Episode #18: "Moral Suasion" |
| 2019 | The Resident | Episode #27: "Virtually Impossible" |
| 2019 | The Rookie | Episode #16: "Greenlight" |
| 2020–2023 | Outer Banks | Episode #7: "Dead Calm"; Episode #8: "The Runway"; Episode #15: "The Darkest Hour"; Episode #26: "The Dark Forest"; Episode #28: "Tapping the Rudder" |
| 2021 | Mixtape | |
| 2022 | Monarch | Episode #2: "There Can Only Be One Queen"; Episode #5: "Death and Christmas" |
| 2022 | Echoes | Episode #7: "Falls" |
| 2023–2025 | Star Trek: Strange New Worlds | Episode #12: "Ad Astra per Aspera"; Episode #26: "The Sehlat Who Ate its Tail" |
| 2025 | NCIS: Tony & Ziva | Episode #3 "Cover Story"; Episode #4 "Wedding Crashers" |
| 2025 | Leverage Redemption | Episode #31: "The Digital Frankenstein Job" |
| 2026 | It's Not Like That | Episode #5: "Cold Salami"; Episode #6: "Love Baskets" |
| 2026 | Watson | Episode #28: "A Third Act Surprise" |

Producer

| Year | Title |
|---|---|
| 2004 | I Love You |
| 2011 | Losing Control |
| 2014 | Bread and Butter |
| 2015 | A Light Beneath Their Feet |

Writer

| Year | Title |
|---|---|
| 2003 | Dance By Design |
| 2004 | I Love You |
| 2011 | Losing Control |

Actress

| Year | Title |
|---|---|
| 2003 | Dance By Design |
