= One Last Con =

Final episode of Suits

- Suits episode
- Episode no.: Season 9 Episode 10
- Directed by: Aaron Korsh
- Written by: Aaron Korsh
- Original air date: September 25, 2019

Guest appearances
- Patrick J. Adams as Mike Ross; Rachael Harris as Sheila Sazs; Wendell Pierce as Robert Zane; Aloma Wright as Gretchen Bodinski; Ray Proscia as Stan Lipschitz; Denise Crosby as Faye Richardson

Episode chronology
← Previous "Thunder Away"	Next → —
- Suits season 9

"One Last Con" is the tenth and final episode of the ninth season of the American legal drama Suits, and 134th episode overall as well as the series finale. It premiered on USA Network in the United States on September 25, 2019. It was written and directed by series creator Aaron Korsh.

== Plot ==
As the trial continues, Harvey calls Mike in as a witness, Faye insists that Harvey take the stand against Samantha the next day in order to win their case. Harvey then discloses to Mike the deal he made with Faye in order for her to leave the firm, and admits that he never stopped trusting Mike; who then suggests one last con together to stop Faye. Mike then offers Samantha another witness to testify against Faye: Katrina, who initially refuses because she is unhappy about the way Harvey treated her, but after Alex talks to her, she tells Faye that she will claim that Faye asked her to spy on Samantha and tamper the evidence. Furious, Faye orders Harvey to make sure Katrina is taken off the witness list, though he counters back and insists that Faye put their agreement in writing.

When Faye arrives to sign the agreement the next morning, Samantha and Mike yell at Harvey for tampering with their witness and a brief fight erupts. When Faye intervenes, Gretchen, whom Louis came to the previous day, swaps out the documents at the last second, revealing that the "fight" between Harvey, Mike, and Samantha was a distraction, and resulting in Faye unknowingly signing a document admitting to witness tampering, essentially ousting her from the firm at the group's urging. She still refuses to back down until Harvey privately persuades her to leave, telling Faye he will give her what she wants (himself) but not the way she wants it. After Harvey tells the group that Faye is packing to leave, Louis rehires Samantha at the firm.

The next day, Louis and Sheila get married with Stan officiating their ceremony, only to have Sheila go into labor, causing them to go to the hospital. On the spur of the moment, Harvey proposes to Donna and they marry on the spot. After Sheila gives birth to a daughter, Harvey and Donna reveal to Louis that they are resigning from the firm and moving to Seattle to work with Mike. Though this is what Harvey told Faye, he admits that while he likes working in the grey, he wants to do it for the good guys. Katrina is promoted to named partner, making the final name of the firm Litt Wheeler Williams Bennett. Before leaving for Seattle, Harvey is visited by Mike; who "interviews" him for his new job, in the exact same fashion as the very first episode, only this time, the roles are reversed. As Donna and Louis ride down the elevator for the last time together, Harvey looks around his office one last time and walks out before leaving for good.

== Production ==
=== Filming ===
"One Last Con" was directed by series creator Aaron Korsh, being Korsh's directiorial debut. It was filmed in Toronto, Canada. The episode began and concluded filming on August 26.

=== Writing ===
"One Last Con" was written by series creator Aaron Korsh. The original version of the script featured Gina Torres as Jessica Pearson, but was cut due to scheduling conflicts.

=== Casting ===
All six of the main cast members appear in the episode including Gabriel Macht, Rick Hoffman, Sarah Rafferty, Amanda Schull, Dulé Hill, and Katherine Heigl as Harvey Specter, Louis Litt, Donna Paulsen, Katrina Bennett, Alex Williams, and Samantha Wheeler respectively. This episode additionally features former series regulars, Patrick J. Adams as Mike Ross, and Meghan Markle and Gina Torres via archived footage.

Series creator Aaron Korsh considered bringing back Markle as Rachel Zane, but decided against it choosing to "respect her new life". Torres was set to appear and had a scene written for her. However, this scene was cut from the episode due to scheduling conflicts with the Suits' spin-off, Pearson.

== Release ==
=== Broadcast ===
"One Last Con" was broadcast on USA Network in the United States on September 25, 2019. The episode premiered to 860 thousand live viewers with a 0.2 share among adults 18-49. When accounting for three day DVR viewership the episode gains an additional 930 thousand viewers for a total of 1.79 million viewers. The episode opened to the lowest live viewership of the season and has the lowest total viewers of the season.

=== Critical reception ===
"One Last Con" was met with mixed reviews from critics. According to Collider's Austin Bender, the episode was rated sixth best of the series on IMDb with a rating of 9.4. Bender felt that the episode ended Suits on a bang. Paul Dailly of TVFanatic opened his review with the line "That was bad." Dailly felt the episode was rushed and unsatisfying, and felt that it was a shame how a "grand show" ended with a "whimper". Ashley Sumerel of TelltaleTV felt that the episode wasn’t perfect but still was a great way to end Suits. Sumerel called the episode "poetic" and "emotional".
