= Ethan Drogin =

American television producer and writer

- Born: United States
- Occupations: Producer, writer

Ethan Drogin is an American television producer and writer, best known for his work on TV shows Suits and Lie to Me.

Drogin joined the Suits writing staff in the first season. He is credited as the writer or co-writer of the following Suits episodes:

- "Bail Out" (2011)
- "Identity Crisis" (2011)
- "Break Point" (2012)
- "Blind-Sided" (2013)
- "Unfinished Business" (2013)

Drogin is a graduate of Harvard University and was previously a sports writer for the Harvard Crimson newspaper. During his time as an undergraduate, Drogin was also President of the Harvard chapter of Sigma Chi, notable in that the University has not officially recognized single-gender fraternities nor sororities since 1984.

== Awards ==
Drogin was also a writer of Suits Recruits, an online multiplayer game and Winner of the 5th Annual Shorty Industry Awards.

Desperate Genius, a screenplay written by Drogin, was a semi-finalist in the 2005 Zoetrope Screenwriting Contest, judged by Terry Zwigoff.
