= Mike Ross (character) =

Fictional character in television series Suits

- Suits character
- Patrick J. Adams as Mike Ross
- First appearance: "Pilot" (2011)
- Last appearance: "One Last Con" (2019)
- Created by: Aaron Korsh
- Portrayed by: Patrick J. Adams

In-universe information
- Full name: Michael James Ross
- Nickname: Mike
- Occupation: Lawyer; Bicycle messenger (former)
- Significant other: Rachel Zane (wife)
- Nationality: American
- Positions: Associate at Pearson Hardman; Attorney at Pearson Specter Litt
- Location: New York City, U.S. Seattle, Washington, U.S.
- Alma mater: Harvard Law School (Note: Fraudulently claimed)

Michael James "Mike" Ross is a fictional character and one of the two main protagonists from the USA Network legal drama television series Suits. The character was created by Aaron Korsh and portrayed by Patrick J. Adams.

Introduced as a smart college dropout with an eidetic memory, Mike is hired by corporate lawyer Harvey Specter (Gabriel Macht) even though he never went to law school. Throughout the series, Mike's story focuses on his rise within a high-profile New York City law firm while hiding his lack of formal credentials. His close partnership with Harvey, his moral outlook, and his eventual path toward becoming a legitimate lawyer form a central part of the show.

== Creation and casting ==
Mike Ross was created by television writer and producer Aaron Korsh. He was meant to be very smart but different—an outsider with no law degree who can still stand up to top lawyers. He possesses a mix of strong memory and quick thinking that helps him succeed in a world where he does not really belong. Much of the show's tension comes from the risk of his secret being found out, which drives many of the main storylines.

The character is portrayed by Patrick J. Adams, who was a main cast member for seasons 1–7 and returned as a guest in season 9. Adams left after season 7 because he felt Mike's story had reached its natural conclusion and wanted to focus more on his personal life and family. In 2019, he returned in the ninth season for a guest appearance, bringing Mike back into contact with his former colleagues and his old law firm.

== Character overview ==
Mike is introduced as a very smart young man who has an eidetic memory, meaning he can remember almost everything he reads after just one look. Before he ever steps into the legal world, he works as a bike messenger, he began smoking cannabis and also makes money on the side by taking the LSAT for other people. His life takes a big turn when he meets Harvey Specter, who sees what he can do and decides to hire him, even though it comes with serious risk as Mike never went to law school. Once he starts working in corporate law, Mike adjusts quickly and often keeps up with lawyers who have been doing it for years, relying on his memory, instincts, and quick thinking.

As time goes on, Mike has a harder time keeping his secret. People around him start to notice things that don't quite make sense, and some of them get close to figuring out what he is hiding. In the fifth season finale, this leads to him getting caught and going to jail for fraud after spending years practicing law without being qualified on paper. After getting out of prison, Mike tries to put his life back together and start fresh. He studies, works toward becoming a real lawyer, and later passes the bar exam.

His personal life also evolves, particularly through his relationship with Rachel Zane (Meghan Markle). They grow closer over time, eventually get married, and later move to Seattle together to start a new chapter and look for better opportunities away from everything that happened before.

== Characterization ==
Mike comes off as someone who is sharp, pays attention to everything, and really cares about people. The way he talks can be a bit funny at times, but he also knows when to be serious, whether he is talking back to someone in charge or helping someone out. A strong part of his character is his clear sense of right and wrong, which guides many of his choices. He works in a place where lying and using people is pretty normal, but he does not really fit in with that. When he sees someone being treated badly, he steps in to help, even if it brings him problems later on. This side of him is shaped in part by his past, especially the loss of his grandmother Edith Ross (Rebecca Schull), which continues to affect him and plays a role in how he sees the world and the decisions he makes.

=== Relationships ===
Mike and Harvey have one of the most important relationships in the series. At first, Harvey takes him in and shows him the ropes, but they do not always see things the same way. As time passes, Mike becomes more confident and starts making his own decisions, which changes how they work together. Sometimes they are on the same side and work well as a team, but there are also moments when they argue or go against each other, especially later in the story.

Mike is also closely connected to Rachel. They start out as coworkers, but over time their relationship turns into something deeper, and they eventually end up getting married. As Mike tries to fix his life and move forward, their relationship grows with him. He is also tied to Donna Paulsen (Sarah Rafferty) and Jessica Pearson (Gina Torres). At times they help him keep things under control, and at other times they question what he is doing and the risk it brings to the firm.

== Reception ==
Mike Ross is regarded as one of the most recognizable characters in Suits and received praise for his character development throughout the series. Comic Book Resources said that the chemistry between Mike and Harvey helped set the feel of the season, mixing courtroom drama with emotional scenes and sharp, playful banter. Christine Persaud of Collider described him as a prodigy whose empathy and desire to help others set him apart from traditional corporate lawyers.

Soniya Hinduja of MovieWeb ranked Mike at number 2 out of 10, calling him a brilliant underdog with strong morals who gets pushed into the intense world of corporate law and constantly has to fight to keep up. Even though he never went to law school, Harvey recruits him because of his eidetic memory and ability to think quickly under pressure. As time passes, Mike faces both legal and personal challenges that push him to mature, and he ultimately earns a promotion to junior partner at Pearson Specter Litt. Harry Kettle of Screen Rant that Mike's relationship with Harvey clicked right away, and as the series went on, their chemistry turned into one of the most memorable bromances, lasting through every change the firm went through.
