= Daniel Arkin =

American television writer and producer

Daniel Arkin is an American television writer and producer. He has written episodes of television series such as The Others, Alias, The X-Files, Star Wars: The Clone Wars, Suits, Las Vegas and Chicago PD. He was also a co-producer on the shows The Agency and Alias. He was the showrunner of Pearson, which he co-created with Suits creator, Aaron Korsh.
