= Christopher Misiano =

American television director

- Born: United States
- Occupations: Director, producer

Christopher Misiano is an American television director and producer. He is best known for his work on ER, The West Wing, and Studio 60 on the Sunset Strip. In 2017, he sold his historic home in Los Feliz, Los Angeles, for US$4.3 million.

== Filmography ==
- Pan Am
- Fringe
- Grey's Anatomy
- Eli Stone
- Studio 60 on the Sunset Strip
- ER
- Revenge
- The West Wing
- Trinity
- Nash Bridges
- Law & Order
- Mistresses
- Third Watch
- The Good Wife
- Perception
- Emergence
- Stumptown
- Council of Dads
- Suits
- Suits LA
