= Michael Smith (director) =

American television director and producer

- Other name: Michael I. Smith
- Occupations: Television director, television producer
- Years active: 1996–present

Michael I. Smith is an American television director and producer. He is best known for his work on Law & Order: Criminal Intent, also working as a first assistant director and unit production manager on the series. He also worked as a second assistant director on the films Gloria (1999), Mickey Blue Eyes (1999), The Simian Line (2000) and Man on the Moon (2001). As well as the television series The Sopranos and Hack.

== Television directing credits ==
- Suits (16 episodes)
- Burn Notice (2 episodes)
- Law & Order: Criminal Intent (8 episodes)
- Law & Order: Special Victims Unit (5 episodes)
- NYC 22 (episode #9: "Playing God")
- White Collar (6 episodes)
- Common Law (episode #9: "Odd Couples")
- Covert Affairs (episode #31: "Speed of Life")
- Satisfaction (2 episodes)
- Allegiance (episode #6: "Liars and Thieves")
- The Mysteries of Laura (3 episodes)
- How to Get Away with Murder (5 episodes)
- Bull (3 episodes)
- Deception (episode #3: "Escapology")
- Manifest (episode #10&26: "Crosswinds"/"Course Deviation")
- Law & Order (3 episodes)
- Suits LA (episode #6: "Dester")
