= Aaron Korsh =

American television producer and writer

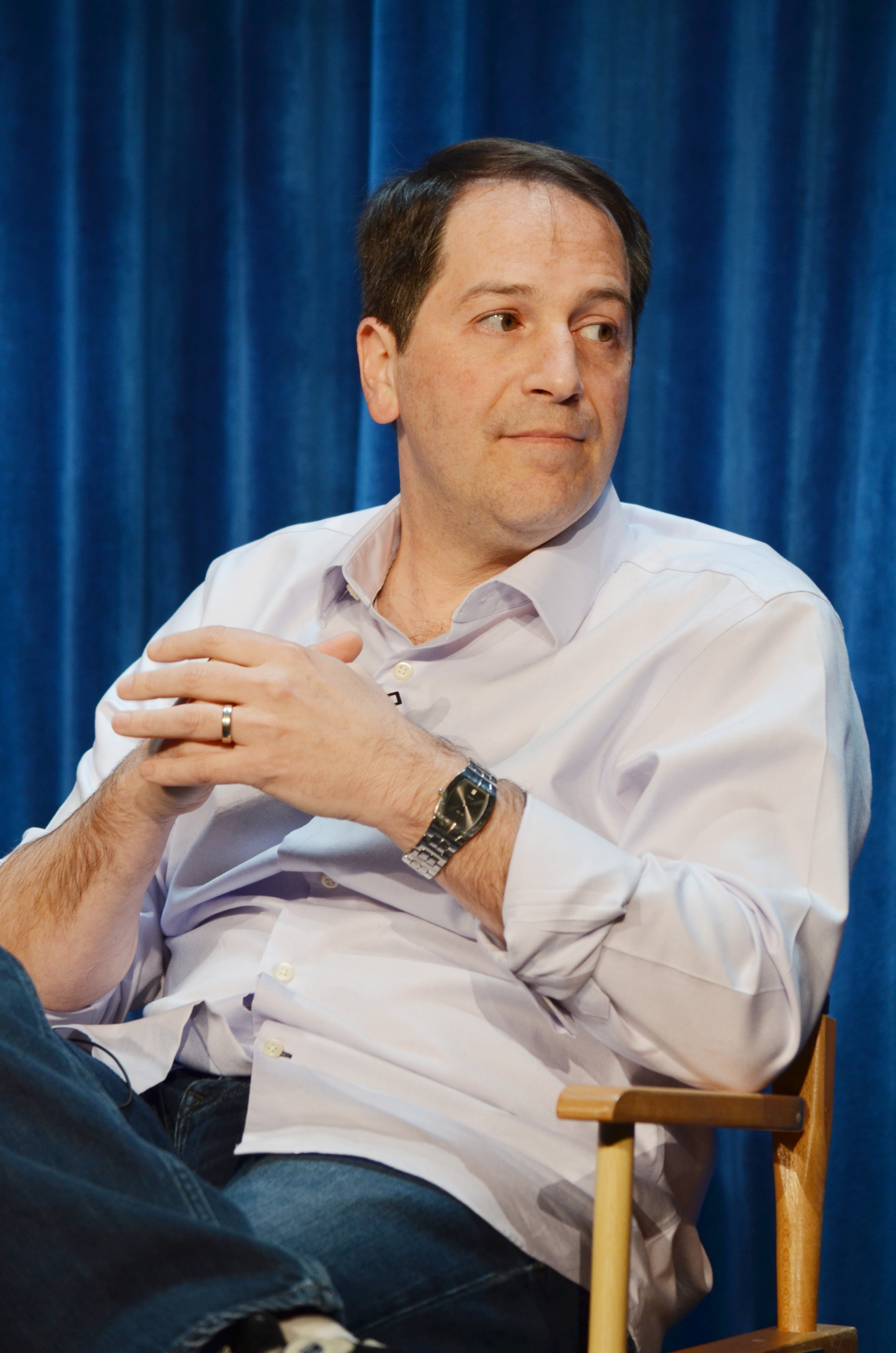
- Korsh in 2013
- Born: Aaron Thomas Korsh; November 7, 1966 (age 59); United States
- Education: University of Pennsylvania
- Occupations: Television producer, writer
- Years active: 1998–present
- Known for: Suits

Aaron Thomas Korsh (born November 7, 1966) is an American television producer, writer, and former investment banker. He is best known for creating the legal drama series Suits, which aired on USA Network from 2011–2019.

== Works ==
Korsh wrote for Everybody Loves Raymond, Just Shoot Me!, Love, Inc., Notes from the Underbelly, The Deep End and the USA Network series Suits, of which he is also the creator, and its spin-off Pearson.

In 2024, Korsh created another spin-off from the original series called Suits LA, which was picked up by NBC.

== Filmography ==
Year	Title	Network	Creator	Writer	Executive Producer	Notes
2001	Everybody Loves Raymond	CBS	No	Yes	No	Episode: "Fairies"
2003	Just Shoot Me!	NBC	No	Yes	No	Episode: "The Last Temptation of Elliot"
2006	Love, Inc.	UPN	No	Yes	No	Episode: "Fired Up"
2007–08	Notes from the Underbelly	ABC	No	Yes	No	
2010	The Deep End	ABC	No	Yes	No	
2011	Suits	USA Network	Yes	Yes	Yes	Also directed "One Last Con"
2015	Paradise Pictures	N/A	No	No	Yes	TV film
2019	Pearson	USA Network	Yes	No	Yes	
2025	Suits LA	NBC	Yes	Yes	Yes	
