= Suits season 1 =

Suits
- Season 1
- DVD cover.
- Starring: Gabriel Macht; Patrick J. Adams; Rick Hoffman; Meghan Markle; Sarah Rafferty; Gina Torres
- No. of episodes: 12

Release
- Original network: USA Network
- Original release: June 23 – September 8, 2011

Season chronology
- Next → Season 2

The first season of the American legal comedy-drama Suits originally aired on USA Network in the United States between June 23, 2011, and September 8, 2011. The season was produced by Hypnotic Films & Television and Universal Cable Productions, and the executive producers were Doug Liman, David Bartis and series creator Aaron Korsh.

== Overview ==
The series revolves around corporate lawyer Harvey Specter and his associate attorney Mike Ross, the latter practicing without a law degree. The season had six series regulars playing employees at the fictional Pearson Hardman law firm in Manhattan: Gabriel Macht, Patrick J. Adams, Rick Hoffman, Meghan Markle, Sarah Rafferty, and Gina Torres.

== Production ==
On April 5, 2010, USA announced that it was developing seven new pilots for its 2010–2011 television season, including A Legal Mind, which would later become Suits. The premiere was written by Aaron Korsh, and David Bartis and Gene Klein served as executive producers. It was later announced on May 17, 2010 that USA ordered a ninety-minute cast-contingent pilot for the series. The network later picked up A Legal Mind on January 19, 2011 and ordered eleven one-hour episodes in addition to the 90-minute pilot.

Creator Aaron Korsh, whose Notes from the Underbelly sitcom was canceled during the 2007–2008 Writers' Strike, wrote a spec script intended to be a "half-hour Entourage-type based on my experiences working on Wall Street." He later realized that the project should have hour-long episodes. Korsh and his agent took the script to several production companies and wanted to give the script to Universal Media Studios. However, Korsh found it odd that the studio did not want to sell the script to NBC, the network the studio typically worked with. Korsh's agent convinced USA Network executive Alex Sepiol that although the series was neither a procedural nor what the network typically did, he would like the characters. Sepiol approved of the script, and by then, Hypnotic Films & Television signed on to the project. The team pitched the script to USA, which bought the script after the pitch. Korsh did not pitch it to anyone else. When rewriting the script, Korsh made only small changes to the first half-hour, up to when Mike is hired. Originally, Mike did not take LSATs for others and only pretends to have attended Harvard, as opposed to pretending he attended Harvard and has a law degree. Korsh noted that there is no degree or test needed to work on Wall Street and be a mathematical genius, unlike the bar examination in law. He decided to "embrace" this difference and change the premise.

The pilot episode was filmed in New York City, where the series is set. The rest of the series is filmed in Toronto, where the sets are built to be identical to the New York law offices seen in the pilot.

To promote the series debut, USA had an advance screening of the pilot on June 2, 2011 at the Hudson River Park and distributed free Häagen-Dazs Sundaes cones at the viewing. The network also had branded ice cream carts, bikes, and scooters give away the Sundaes and USA/Entertainment Weekly 2011 promotion summer guides on June 22 and June 23 in New York, Los Angeles, Chicago, San Francisco, and Boston to promote the pilot.

=== Crew ===
The season was created by Aaron Korsh and was aired on USA Network in the United States. The season was produced by Hypnotic Films & Television and Universal Cable Productions. The executive producers were Korsh, Doug Liman, and David Bartis. The staff writers were: Korsh with three writing credits; Sean Jablonski, Jon Cowan, Ethan Drogin, and Rick Muirragui with two each; and Erica Lipez with one. The directors throughout the season were Kevin Bray, John Scott, Dennie Gordon, Kate Woods, Terry McDonough, Tim Matheson, Norberto Barba, Felix Alcala, Jennifer Getzinger, and Mike Smith.

== Cast ==
=== Regular cast ===
- Gabriel Macht as Harvey Specter
- Patrick J. Adams as Mike Ross
- Rick Hoffman as Louis Litt
- Meghan Markle as Rachel Zane
- Sarah Rafferty as Donna Paulsen
- Gina Torres as Jessica Pearson

=== Recurring cast ===
- Tom Lipinski as Trevor Evans
- Vanessa Ray as Jenny Griffith
- Max Topplin as Harold Gunderson

=== Guest cast ===
- Rebecca Schull as Edith Ross
- Ben Hollingsworth as Kyle Durant

Six actors received star billing in the show's first season. Each character works at the fictional Pearson Hardman law firm in Manhattan. Gabriel Macht plays corporate lawyer Harvey Specter, who is promoted to senior partner and is forced to hire an associate attorney. Patrick J. Adams plays college dropout Mike Ross, who wins the associate position with his eidetic memory and genuine desire to be a good lawyer. Rick Hoffman plays Louis Litt, Harvey's jealous rival and the direct supervisor of the firm's first-year associates. Meghan Markle plays Rachel Zane, a paralegal who aspires to be an attorney but her test anxiety prevents her from attending Harvard Law School. Sarah Rafferty plays Donna Paulsen, Harvey's long-time legal secretary, confidant, and initially the only one at the firm who knows Mike never attended law school. Rafferty was recommended for the role by Macht, who had been friends with Rafferty for twenty years at the time of production. When she auditioned for the role, Korsh felt she was best actress for the part. Gina Torres plays Jessica Pearson, the co-founder and managing partner of the firm.

The season also featured several recurring guest stars. Tom Lipinski appeared in four episodes as Mike's drug-dealing best friend Trevor Evans, whose friendship with Mike deteriorates throughout the season. Vanessa Ray plays Trevor's girlfriend Jenny Griffith in seven episodes. Rebecca Schull plays Edith Ross, Mike's grandmother and caretaker after his parents' deaths, in two episodes. Ben Hollingsworth appears in two episodes as Kyle Durant, Mike's rival and fellow associate, and Max Topplin appears in four episodes as Harold Gunderson, another associate.

== Episodes ==
Suits season one episodes
No. overall	No. in season	Title	Directed by	Written by	Original release date	U.S. viewers (millions)
1	1	"Pilot"	Kevin Bray	Aaron Korsh	June 23, 2011	4.64
Securing a senior partnership at Pearson Hardman, New York City's premier closer, Harvey Specter, is tasked with recruiting a new associate from Harvard Law. Unexpectedly, his search introduces him to Mike Ross, a college dropout who was evading a marijuana sting operation, and stumbled into Harvey's interview accidentally. Impressed by Mike's photographic memory and kindred personality, Harvey overlooks Mike's lack of a law degree and hires him, advising him to disassociate from his criminal past. Later, Harvey's promotion is threatened when he fails to close a case due to covert interference from another partner, Louis Litt. Managing partner Jessica Pearson considers reversing Harvey's promotion but offers him a chance at redemption: personally handling a pro bono case involving sexual harassment allegations by a woman (portrayed by Dagmara Dominczyk). Yet, despite this directive, Harvey delegates this task to Mike.
2	2	"Errors and Omissions"	John Scott	Sean Jablonski	June 30, 2011	3.89
A judge (Currie Graham) insists that Harvey had an affair with his wife (Nazanin Boniadi) and refuses to fairly judge Harvey's case. Meanwhile, Louis Litt reveals that Mike failed his drug test and blackmails him into smoking marijuana to win over a prestigious client.
3	3	"Inside Track"	Kevin Bray	Aaron Korsh	July 7, 2011	4.53
When the new CEO of a motor company wants to move production overseas, Harvey and Mike try to find a loophole to oust him and persuade one of the company's most loyal employees (Titus Welliver) to take the job of CEO. Meanwhile, Mike prepares for the Rookie Dinner and tries to convince his friend Trevor (Tom Lipinski) to stop dealing marijuana.
4	4	"Dirty Little Secrets"	Dennie Gordon	Jon Cowan	July 14, 2011	4.38
Harvey defends Jessica's ex-husband (Russell Hornsby) from allegations that his ALS medication is causing serious side effects though his new girlfriend doesn't seem to like Jessica. Meanwhile, Mike is assigned his first solo case, and his secret is almost discovered.
5	5	"Bail Out"	Kate Woods	Ethan Drogin	July 21, 2011	4.38
Harvey must choose between closing a lucrative deal and helping his trusted driver (Anand Rajaram) defend against a lawsuit. Meanwhile, Trevor has given up dealing drugs and needs Mike to help him restart his life and escape his past.
6	6	"Tricks of the Trade"	Terry McDonough	Rick Muirragui	July 28, 2011	4.44
Mike and Harvey work together to defend a woman (Jenny Mollen), who they believe has been falsely accused of insider trading. Mike helps Rachel study for the LSAT, but he struggles to hide the fact that he used to take the LSAT for others.
7	7	"Play the Man"	Tim Matheson	Erica Lipez	August 4, 2011	4.03
Mike is pitted against one of Louis' protégés (Ben Hollingsworth) in a mock trial. Harvey takes on an old rival and romantic interest (Abigail Spencer). Rachel is a witness in the mock trial, and Mike accepts defeat in order to not hurt her.
8	8	"Identity Crisis"	Norberto Barba	Ethan Drogin	August 11, 2011	3.96
The daughter (Amanda Crew) of a businessman (James Morrison) threatens to reveal Mike's secret unless he and the firm drop the case they have against her while Harvey tries to fix problems Louis has made for the firm. She turns out to be a skilled hacker, who creates an entry for Mike in Harvard's computer system tracking graduates, along with attaining a replacement copy of the degree.
9	9	"Undefeated"	Felix Alcala	Rick Muirragui	August 18, 2011	4.45
Harvey must decide if he can break his ethical code in order to defeat shady lawyer Travis Tanner (Eric Close). Meanwhile, Rachel is accused of leaking Pearson Hardman information to a competitor and is defended by Mike. Cleared, she returns to Pearson Hardman and obtains a raise from Louis.
10	10	"Shelf Life"	Jennifer Getzinger	Sean Jablonski	August 25, 2011	3.82
Mike and Harvey have to fire a man (John Billingsley) who has been working for nine years with a fake diploma. Mike identifies with this man and defends him, revealing a conspiracy. Mike and Rachel struggle with their feelings for each other while Louis creates a rift in Mike's relationship with Jenny Griffith (Vanessa Ray).
11	11	"Rules of the Game"	Mike Smith	Jon Cowan	September 1, 2011	3.96
The district attorney and Harvey's former mentor (Gary Cole) turns to his protégé when his office is being investigated for burying evidence. Meanwhile, Mike and Louis try to divide a mogul's estate between his two daughters, and Jenny worries that Mike is hiding something.
12	12	"Dog Fight"	Kevin Bray	Aaron Korsh	September 8, 2011	3.47
Harvey tries to correct a past mistake by freeing an innocent man. However, the new district attorney (Chi McBride) seems more focused on preserving the system than seeking justice. Elsewhere, Trevor returns and seeks help from Mike.

== Ratings ==
The pilot episode gained a 1.6 ratings share among adults aged 18–49 and garnered an estimated 4.6 million viewers, making the episode the ninth most watched basic cable show for the week. The episode was watched by 2 million people aged 18–49 and by 2.1 million people aged 24–54, a double-digit increase over the January premiere of the network's other legal drama Fairly Legal. The second episode, which aired June 30, experienced a four-tenths ratings drop, which was attributed to the holiday weekend. However, the episode's ratings were bolstered by a high DVR viewings. The ratings rose the next week garnering 4.5 million views with a 1.3 ratings share among adults aged 18–49. The premiere of Jersey Shore, which shares the Thursday 10pm timeslot with Suits, caused a decrease in ratings, a trend that continued for the rest of the season. Together, Burn Notice and Suits were the top scripted shows in primetime television, and no other network aired a scripted series that garnered over four million total viewers, one million viewers aged 25–54, or one million viewers aged 18–49. Suits was ranked third in males aged 18–49 and males aged 25–54. The series made USA Network the most watched network in the Thursday 10pm timeslot and gained more total viewers and households than any other scripted series in the timeslot. The series had the network's third best performing premiere season in viewers aged 18–49, in viewers aged 18–34, and in total viewers.

No.	Title	Air date	Time slot (EST)	18–49 rating	Viewers (millions)	Weekly rank
1	"Pilot"	June 23, 2011	Thursdays; 9:00 p.m.	1.6	4.64	#1
2	"Errors and Omissions"	June 30, 2011	Thursdays; 9:00 p.m.	1.2	3.89	#1
3	"Inside Track"	July 7, 2011	Thursdays; 9:00 p.m.	1.3	4.53	#2
4	"Dirty Little Secrets"	July 14, 2011	Thursdays; 9:00 p.m.	1.3	4.38	#3
5	"Bail Out"	July 21, 2011	Thursdays; 9:00 p.m.	1.5	4.38	#1
6	"Tricks of the Trade"	July 28, 2011	Thursdays; 9:00 p.m.	1.5	4.44	#1
7	"Play the Man"	August 4, 2011	Thursdays; 9:00 p.m.	1.3	4.03	N/A
8	"Identity Crisis"	August 11, 2011	Thursdays; 9:00 p.m.	1.2	3.96	#2
9	"Undefeated"	August 18, 2011	Thursdays; 9:00 p.m.	1.5	4.46	#1
10	"Shelf Life"	August 25, 2011	Thursdays; 9:00 p.m.	1.2	3.82	#2
11	"Rules of the Game"	September 1, 2011	Thursdays; 9:00 p.m.	1.2	3.96	#1
12	"Dog Fight"	September 8, 2011	Thursdays; 9:00 p.m.	1.3	3.47	N/A

== Home media release ==
Suits: Season One
Set details	Special features	
12 episodes; 3-disc set; 1.78:1 aspect ratio; English (Dolby Digital 5.1 Surround); Subtitles: English	Audio Commentaries; "Pilot" by Aaron Korsh, David Bartis, Gabriel Macht and Patrick J. Adams; "Dog Fight" by Korsh, Bartis, Macht and Adams; Extended Pilot; Deleted scenes; Bloopers; "Cross Examination: Fan Q&A"; UltraViolet access	
Release dates
Region 1	Region 2	Region 4
May 1, 2012	April 30, 2012	July 6, 2012
