= Suits season 2 =

Suits
- Season 2
- DVD cover.
- Starring: Gabriel Macht; Patrick J. Adams; Rick Hoffman; Meghan Markle; Sarah Rafferty; Gina Torres
- No. of episodes: 16

Release
- Original network: USA Network
- Original release: June 14, 2012 – February 21, 2013

Season chronology
- ← Previous; Season 1 Next → Season 3

The second season of the American legal comedy-drama Suits was ordered on August 11, 2011. The season originally aired on USA Network in the United States between June 14, 2012 and February 21, 2013. The season was produced by Hypnotic Films & Television and Universal Cable Productions, and the executive producers were Doug Liman, David Bartis and series creator Aaron Korsh. The season had six series regulars playing employees at the fictional Pearson Hardman law firm in Manhattan: Gabriel Macht, Patrick J. Adams, Rick Hoffman, Meghan Markle, Sarah Rafferty, and Gina Torres.

== Overview ==
The series revolves around corporate lawyer Harvey Specter and his associate attorney Mike Ross, the latter practicing without a law degree.

== Cast ==
=== Regular cast ===
- Gabriel Macht as Harvey Specter
- Patrick J. Adams as Mike Ross
- Rick Hoffman as Louis Litt
- Meghan Markle as Rachel Zane
- Sarah Rafferty as Donna Paulsen
- Gina Torres as Jessica Pearson

=== Recurring cast ===
- Abigail Spencer as Dana Scott
- David Costabile as Daniel Hardman
- Eric Close as Travis Tanner

=== Guest cast ===
- Rebecca Schull as Edith Ross

Six actors received star billing in the show's first season. Each character works at the fictional Pearson Hardman law firm in Manhattan. Gabriel Macht plays corporate lawyer Harvey Specter, who is promoted to senior partner and is forced to hire an associate attorney. Patrick J. Adams plays college dropout Mike Ross, who wins the associate position with his eidetic memory and genuine desire to be a good lawyer. Rick Hoffman plays Louis Litt, Harvey's jealous rival and the direct supervisor of the firm's first-year associates. Meghan Markle plays Rachel Zane, a paralegal who aspires to be an attorney but her test anxiety prevents her from attending Harvard Law School. Sarah Rafferty plays Donna Paulsen, Harvey's long-time legal secretary, confidant, and initially the only one at the firm who knows Mike never attended law school. Gina Torres plays Jessica Pearson, the co-founder and managing partner of the firm.

== Episodes ==
Suits season two episodes
No. overall	No. in season	Title	Directed by	Written by	Original release date	U.S. viewers (millions)
13	1	"She Knows"	Michael Smith	Aaron Korsh	June 14, 2012	3.47
Mike is trusted to close a major lawsuit. Harvey must decide whether or not to keep Mike on staff after Jessica reveals that she knows Mike's secret. Meanwhile, the firm's co-founder Daniel Hardman (David Costabile) returns after a five-year absence, a self-professed "changed man" following the death of his wife.
14	2	"The Choice"	Kevin Bray	Jon Cowan	June 21, 2012	3.80
Mike confronts Rachel about the cell phone message she left him, while Jessica approaches Harvey looking for support regarding Daniel Hardman's impending return. Harvey goes to a Senior partner, Paul Porter (Michael Cristofer), to provide assistance in a bankruptcy case with the hope of winning over Porter's department to Jessica's side. Harvey ultimately goes against Porter's and Jessica's instructions, angering both, in order to win the case his own way. Meanwhile, Louis is "seduced" by gifts and promises from Hardman.
15	3	"Meet the New Boss"	Michael Smith	Erica Lipez	June 28, 2012	3.88
Harvey and Daniel start a feud, carrying out different plans of attack while representing a hospital against nurse union head Nell (Margo Martindale), and Mike is caught in the middle of it. When Jessica informs Louis that a trade publication has listed Pearson Hardman next-to-last in a survey about associates' quality of life, he is assigned a consultant from Harvard Law named Sheila (Rachael Harris), who appears to be Louis' female equivalent. Meanwhile, Donna takes Rachel to a bar and convinces her to complete an online dating profile to move on from Mike. But when Mike helps Rachel with her bio, it sends her back to him and convinces her that Mike has a secret he's not sharing. Rachel is seen taking the LSATs. Harvey tells Mike the story behind Hardman's past.
16	4	"Discovery"	Kevin Bray	Daniel Arkin	July 12, 2012	3.70
Travis Tanner is back in town, and has his sights set firmly on Harvey. His accusations that Pearson Hardman withheld evidence in a case where they represented Coastal Motors motivate Jessica and Harvey to be less than transparent with Hardman. Donna is shocked to discover that she actually received and signed for the damning document. Meanwhile, Louis and Mike find common ground in a case where they defend a bottled water giant, but Louis’ paranoia might derail a budding friendship and his own standing at the firm.
17	5	"Break Point"	Christopher Misiano	Ethan Drogin	July 19, 2012	3.72
Harvey feels undermined when Jessica makes him second chair to Allison Holt (Diane Neal) on a lawsuit that could make or break the firm — and his back-seat driving might have far-reaching consequences. Mike represents a tennis prodigy (Julian Alcaraz) who wants to be emancipated from his coach-father (Conrad Dunn), who opposes the 16-year-old turning pro. Donna deals with the fallout from the Coastal Motors case and is fired when she panics and destroys the document.
18	6	"All In"	John Scott	Karla Nappi	July 26, 2012	3.89
While in Atlantic City, Harvey and Mike decide to pursue the case of a man who gambled away his company, due to Harvey's history with the client, Keith Hoyt (Peter Outerbridge). Meanwhile, Louis and Rachel work together to protect an admired institution, and Jessica struggles as she tries to defend the firm. Scott Grimes appears as an entrepreneur who enjoys high-stakes gambling, and Matthew Glave as an attorney.
19	7	"Sucker Punch"	Adam Davidson	Genevieve Sparling	August 2, 2012	3.41
The pending lawsuit against the firm sees Harvey turn to Zoe Lawford (Jacinda Barrett), an old colleague with whom he has a past, for assistance in proving Pearson Hardman’s case. Zoe has the team prepare a mock trial as a warm-up for the real thing, and Louis is asked to take the role of Travis Tanner. Harvey asks Donna to testify that she destroyed the Coastal Motors memo, but she has retained a lawyer of her own and plans to plead the Fifth.
20	8	"Rewind"	Félix Alcalá	Rick Muirragui	August 9, 2012	3.42
Harvey and Mike look back five years into their pasts to see how it affects them today. The episode reveals Harvey's rise from senior associate to junior partner very shortly after his father's death, Mike's initial motivation for getting into the illegal LSAT-proxy business, details surrounding Hardman's original dismissal from the firm, and a person of interest surrounding that dismissal who can help Jessica battle Hardman for managing control in the present day.
21	9	"Asterisk"	Jennifer Getzinger	Justin Peacock	August 16, 2012	4.00
When Louis is promoted to senior partner and has the deciding vote in the firm's future, Harvey must convince him to support Jessica. After Louis discovers that Hardman intended to make him the fall guy for his embezzlement schemes five years ago, Hardman admits his indiscretion, then tries to convince Louis that he is "not that person" anymore. Meanwhile, Harvey defends a brash sportscaster (Jeff B. Davis) who accuses a star baseball player of using performance-enhancing drugs, with no apparent evidence to back up his claims. Donna returns to the firm. Rachel learns that she did well on the LSAT. Mike uses his end-of-year bonus to buy an apartment for his grandmother in Manhattan. While waiting at the apartment for his grandmother so he can surprise her, Rachel arrives and informs Mike that his grandmother died.
22	10	"High Noon"	Kevin Bray	Erica Lipez	August 23, 2012	4.48
Hardman wins the partners' vote, including the vote from Louis, and replaces Jessica as managing partner. He and Louis begin making Harvey and Mike's work lives miserable. Harvey smokes marijuana with Mike, and when Louis observes Harvey high, he has Hardman order him to take a drug test. Harvey refuses and a partners meeting is held to determine if he will be fired. At that meeting, Harvey and Mike reveal evidence (not all valid) of Hardman's past treachery, including his setting up Donna, Harvey and ultimately Jessica for the fall in the Coastal Motors case, and it is Hardman who is fired. Mike meets his childhood friend Tess (Elisabeth Hower) at his grandmother's funeral, where Tess and Rachel support him in making a speech. Mike wants to act on the mutual attraction with Rachel, but she asks him to wait. Rachel changes her mind and goes to Mike's apartment, only to discover him in bed with Tess.
23	11	"Blind-Sided"	David Platt	Ethan Drogin	January 17, 2013	3.57
Mike is still having sex and getting high with Tess, even after the interruption from Rachel. Mike is assigned the case of a young man named Liam (Reiley McClendon) who was involved in a hit and run while driving home from a party. The memory of his own parents being killed by a drunk driver compromises Mike's ability to act in the best interest of his client. Harvey wants to celebrate Hardman's dismissal with Zoe Lawford, but finds out that Zoe's brother has just dropped off his daughter, Olivia, on short notice. Meanwhile, Louis meets with Sheila (Rachael Harris), who already knows that he made senior partner and appears to be turned on by that fact. Louis asks for Sheila's help in landing a top-notch new associate from Harvard named Maria (Aarti Mann), but it's all for naught when Jessica makes up a "hiring freeze". Louis thinks it's a punishment, but Jessica does it to prevent him from hiring someone who could inadvertently reveal Mike's Harvard secret.
24	12	"Blood in the Water"	Roger Kumble	Genevieve Sparling	January 24, 2013	3.75
Harvey is suspicious when a client, Trent Devon (Jon Foster), suddenly decides to not let his company go public, while also expressing reservations about retaining Pearson Hardman. Allison Holt, who is working for the rival firm Bratton-Gould, makes a professional attack on Pearson Hardman, and begins to lure away the firm's best associates. Louis has to face Harvey's wrath for his previous actions when he voted for Hardman. Louis takes his frustrations out on Harold, and when the firm loses a client on a case assigned to Harold, Louis fires him in front of everyone. Louis considers leaving Pearson Hardman altogether, and meets with Allison.
25	13	"Zane vs. Zane"	Nicole Kassell	Rick Muirragui	January 31, 2013	3.36
A settlement that Harvey negotiated is in jeopardy of falling apart, as high-profile lawyer Robert Zane (Wendell Pierce) steps in as opposing counsel and drastically reduces the settlement offer. Robert Zane is Rachel's father, and Harvey attempts to gain leverage from Rachel and Robert's contentious relationship by adding Rachel to the case as a paralegal. Meanwhile, Louis engages in an escalating prank war with Katrina Bennett (Amanda Schull), Harvey's newly hired senior associate.
26	14	"He's Back"	Kevin Bray	Daniel Arkin	February 7, 2013	3.07
Daniel Hardman returns, bringing a sexual harassment lawsuit against Pearson Hardman on behalf of a former employee. Harvey and Jessica are tactically limited because of a non-disclosure agreement that Jessica signed when Hardman left. Mike attempts to convince the former employee to settle so that the firm can focus on the Folsom Foods litigation.
27	15	"Normandy"	Terry McDonough	Jon Cowan	February 14, 2013	2.90
Battling too many cases on depleted resources, Pearson Hardman takes an "all in" approach on one location, while mulling over a deal to merge with a British firm that employs one of Harvey's old flames, Dana "Scottie" Scott (Abigail Spencer). Mike develops a less than desirable working relationship with Katrina. Meanwhile, Rachel finds out she was not accepted at Harvard.
28	16	"War"	John Scott	Aaron Korsh	February 21, 2013	3.20
A British firm headed by Edward Darby (Conleth Hill) decides to sneak in with a tempting offer for Jessica's firm, clashing with Harvey's plans for the future and Jessica's own vision, and leaving them both to make up their minds on what direction to take with their careers. Louis meets his match in the form of Darby's quartermaster, Nigel (Adam Godley), as the two try to find a way to keep both their jobs viable in the new combined firm. Harvey makes a wager with Edward, which would stop the merger should Harvey win, on a case that is later handed over to Mike. However, Jessica threatens Mike with exposing his secret if he wins the case. Mike loses the case and faces Harvey's wrath for his disloyalty. Mike finally tells Rachel that he never went to Harvard Law, then ends up having sex with her.

== Ratings ==
No.	Title	Original air date	Time slot (EST)	Viewers (in millions)	Rating (Adults 18–49)	18-49 Rank on Cable	Note
1	"She Knows"	June 14, 2012	Thursdays; 9:00 p.m.	3.47	1.1	#4	
2	"The Choice"	June 21, 2012	Thursdays; 9:00 p.m.	3.80	1.2	#2	
3	"Meet the New Boss"	June 28, 2012	Thursdays; 9:00 p.m.	3.88	1.3	#5	
4	"Discovery"	July 12, 2012	Thursdays; 9:00 p.m.	3.70	1.2	#5	
5	"Break Point"	July 19, 2012	Thursdays; 9:00 p.m.	3.72	1.2	#5	
6	"All In"	July 26, 2012	Thursdays; 9:00 p.m.	3.89	1.3	#3	
7	"Sucker Punch"	August 2, 2012	Thursdays; 9:00 p.m.	3.41	1.2	#2	
8	"Rewind"	August 9, 2012	Thursdays; 9:00 p.m.	3.42	1.1	#5	
9	"Asterisk"	August 16, 2012	Thursdays; 9:00 p.m.	4.00	1.4	#1	
10	"High Noon"	August 23, 2012	Thursdays; 9:00 p.m.	4.49	1.9	#1	
11	"Blind-Sided"	January 17, 2013	Thursdays; 9:00 p.m.	3.57	1.2	#6	
12	"Blood in the Water"	January 24, 2013	Thursdays; 9:00 p.m.	3.75	1.1	#7	
13	"Zane vs. Zane"	January 31, 2013	Thursdays; 9:00 p.m.	3.36	1.0	#8	
14	"He's Back"	February 7, 2013	Thursdays; 9:00 p.m.	3.07	1.0	#11	
15	"Normandy"	February 14, 2013	Thursdays; 9:00 p.m.	2.90	1.0	#9	
16	"War"	February 21, 2013	Thursdays; 9:00 p.m.	3.20	1.0	#7	
