= Suits season 3 =

Suits
- Season 3
- DVD cover
- Starring: Gabriel Macht; Patrick J. Adams; Rick Hoffman; Meghan Markle; Sarah Rafferty; Gina Torres
- No. of episodes: 16

Release
- Original network: USA Network
- Original release: July 16, 2013 – April 17, 2014

Season chronology
- ← Previous; Season 2 Next → Season 4

The third season of the American legal comedy-drama Suits was ordered on October 12, 2012. The third season originally aired on USA Network in the United States between July 16, 2013 and April 10, 2014. The season was produced by Hypnotic Films & Television and Universal Cable Productions, and the executive producers were Doug Liman, David Bartis and series creator Aaron Korsh. The season had six series regulars playing employees at the fictional Pearson Darby, later Pearson Darby Specter and Pearson Specter, law firm in Manhattan: Gabriel Macht, Patrick J. Adams, Rick Hoffman, Meghan Markle, Sarah Rafferty, and Gina Torres.

== Overview ==
The series revolves around corporate lawyer Harvey Specter and his associate attorney Mike Ross, the latter practicing without a law degree.

== Cast ==
Regular cast

- Gabriel Macht as Harvey Specter
- Patrick J. Adams as Mike Ross
- Rick Hoffman as Louis Litt
- Meghan Markle as Rachel Zane
- Sarah Rafferty as Donna Paulsen
- Gina Torres as Jessica Pearson

Recurring cast

- Abigail Spencer as Dana Scott
- Conleth Hill as Edward Darby
- Amanda Schull as Katrina Bennett
- Michelle Fairley as Dr. Ava Hessington
- Max Beesley as Stephen Huntley

Guest cast

- Gary Cole as D.A. Cameron Dennis
- Michael Phelps as himself
- Stephen Macht as Professor Gerard

Six actors received star billing in the show's first season. Each character works at the fictional Pearson Hardman law firm in Manhattan. Gabriel Macht plays corporate lawyer Harvey Specter, who is promoted to senior partner and is forced to hire an associate attorney. Patrick J. Adams plays college dropout Mike Ross, who wins the associate position with his eidetic memory and genuine desire to be a good lawyer. Rick Hoffman plays Louis Litt, Harvey's jealous rival and the direct supervisor of the firm's first-year associates. Meghan Markle plays Rachel Zane, a paralegal who aspires to be an attorney but her test anxiety prevents her from attending Harvard Law School. Sarah Rafferty plays Donna Paulsen, Harvey's long-time legal secretary, confidant, and the only one at the firm who knows Mike never attended law school. Gina Torres plays Jessica Pearson, the co-founder and managing partner of the firm.

Michelle Fairley guest stars in multiple episodes as oil executive Dr. Ava Hessington, a high-profile client for the new Pearson Darby firm whose father has a past with Darby. Gary Cole reprises his Season 1 role as former Manhattan DA Cameron Dennis, now assigned as a special prosecutor in the Hessington case. Max Beesley is introduced as recurring character Stephen Huntley, Darby's right-hand man from the London office, who is considered the British Harvey. Swimmer Michael Phelps made a cameo appearance in the eleventh episode of the season. Stephen Macht, Gabriel Macht's father, guest stars as Professor Gerard in the season's twelfth episode.

== Episodes ==
No. overall	No. in season	Title	Directed by	Written by	Original release date	US viewers (millions)
29	1	"The Arrangement"	Christopher Misiano	Aaron Korsh	July 16, 2013	2.93
The merger complete, Jessica's new partnership with Darby is tested when he assigns Harvey a high-profile client, an oil executive named Dr. Ava Hessington (Michelle Fairley), who has a deeper past with Darby than originally thought. Ava faces the loss of her freedom, if Harvey can't produce a win for her case. Mike works to reconcile with Harvey, while also trying to manage the fallout from his revelation to Rachel. After telling her "everything", they end up happily in bed together. Meanwhile, Louis convinces Darby to give him quartermaster responsibilities at the firm over his rival, Nigel, but the move backfires when Nigel is put in charge of the associates over Louis.
30	2	"I Want You to Want Me"	Roger Kumble	Jon Cowan	July 23, 2013	2.88
After being told by Jessica that he can have his pick of the Pearson Darby associates, Louis asks Mike to help him on a seemingly unwinnable eminent domain case. He offers Mike a mentor-mentee partnership in which they treat each other as equals, while Harvey continues to assure Mike that the two of them are "through". Harvey is charged with keeping Dr. Ava Hessington out of jail, but the case is complicated by his former mentor — the special prosecuting attorney and disgraced former DA of Manhattan, Cameron Dennis. When Harvey discovers that Cameron is making a deal with Ava's protege Nick, he reluctantly teams up with Jessica in a different plan of attack. The case is eventually settled out of court with Ava keeping her company and staying out of jail, though Harvey is not entirely pleased with the settlement. Meanwhile Donna and Rachel try to help Harvey and Mike make amends. In the end, Harvey and Mike reconcile, leaving Louis behind.
31	3	"Unfinished Business"	Anton Cropper	Ethan Drogin	July 30, 2013	2.47
After having pleaded guilty to bribery, Ava Hessington gets arrested because Cameron Dennis now wants to link her to the murders of six protestors committed by the foreign colonel she bribed. Harvey and Mike finally get her out by having Harold represent the witnesses in a lawsuit against them, but both men think that she really ordered these murders. During the case, Harvey meets Darby's "fixer", Stephen Huntley. While Harvey is tied up with Ava's personal case, he asks Louis to represent Ava's company, Hessington Oil, amidst a potential hostile takeover. Katrina Bennett wants to work the case with Louis, but refuses to be his personal associate so he rejects her. She then tries to work for Harvey, but is stopped and put in her place by Mike and Donna. Afterward, she sends everybody in the firm a prank video of Mike, trying to annoy him and get closer to Louis. She then is chewed out by Harvey, after which Louis lets her work on his case after all. Meanwhile, Donna forgives Mike and Rachel, and Mike and Rachel discuss being boyfriend and girlfriend. Huntley pursues Donna romantically, while Harvey lets Mike in on his plan to unseat Jessica as managing partner.
32	4	"Conflict of Interest"	Michael Smith	Daniel Arkin	August 6, 2013	2.99
The cases of Harvey (Ava Hessington's murder trial) and Louis (the takeover battle for Hessington Oil) continue. While Jessica, Louis and Katrina want Ava to resign as CEO/President of Hessington Oil, Darby, Harvey and Mike don't. Katrina and Mike work together to find a way to prevent the Gionopoulos Holdings takeover. Together, they discover that since Tony Gionopoulos has other holdings which are regulated by the FTC, a takeover of Hessington Oil would put them in violation of anti-trust laws. Using this information, Louis confronts Gionopoulos' employee who laughs at Louis, saying they as Wharton investment bankers are smarter than any lawyers. He notes that Gionopoulos is having dinner with his "old friend", the FTC commissioner. Having failed to stop Gionopoulos, Louis offers to be Jessica's "black swan" and do her dirty work for her by convincing the Hessington Oil board to fire Ava, given that so many figure her to be guilty of the murders, and retain Pearson Darby as their legal counsel. During a mock deposition, Mike and Harvey become convinced that Ava is innocent. She says that she paid $100 million more in bribe money to prevent innocent people from being harmed, and to help relocate those who would lose their homes and livestock. The conflicts between Jessica and both Harvey and Darby heat up when she prevents Louis from going to the board, thus sealing Ava's fate as the board fires her. Meanwhile, Donna and Stephen agree to have a date and "an arrangement" to "satisfy his needs" while he is in New York. He gets tickets to see Daniel Day-Lewis in Macbeth, then tells Donna he has arranged dinner with Daniel after the show, causing her to instead take Stephen somewhere more private. She attempts to tell Harvey about this the next day, but the timing isn't right. Mike and Rachel proclaim their love for each other, shortly after Mike and Katrina agree to a truce.
33	5	"Shadow of a Doubt"	Félix Alcalá	Genevieve Sparling	August 13, 2013	2.79
Stephen assures Harvey that, despite Ava losing her company, winning Ava's murder trial is enough to get Harvey a shot at unseating Jessica as managing partner. Harvey figures his best chance at winning is to get the murder charge dismissed, but Cameron Dennis and the judge want to proceed with a trial. Harvey and Stephen then confront Tony Gionopoulos (Rob Stewart) with a threat to tie up his businesses in England with court cases unless he testifies that Dennis colluded with him to get Ava unseated, but Gionopoulos isn't scared away. Stephen then goes behind Harvey's back and threatens Gionopoulos' daughter with a lawsuit, thus causing an angry Gionopoulos to start dumping shares of Hessington Oil and depleting the company's value. Harvey approaches Jessica for help, and they plan to have Gionopoulos Holdings buy Hessington Oil but reinstate Ava as CEO, in exchange for Gionopoulos testifying that Dennis left him alone in a room with a damning tape of Ava for him to view. Despite the new evidence, Dennis refuses to call off the murder trial even though he figures his chances of winning are down to about 20%. Elsewhere, Donna and Stephen escalate their romance, but she gets angry with him when he references their relationship in an argument with Harvey. Louis confronts Nigel over his handling of the associates, while Mike and Rachel work on a case to get $30 million returned by an accountant who embezzled it from a client. Mike later gets angry with Rachel when he finds out from her father that she has applied to attend law school at Stanford. The episode concludes with Jessica telling Harvey her plans to add him as a named partner in the New York office, but he questions her motives.
34	6	"The Other Time"	John Scott	Rick Muirragui	August 20, 2013	2.76
In a flashback to ten years ago, Harvey resigns from the DA's office (on the advice of his father and Donna) rather than be complicit in Cameron's ethical violation. Taking Donna with him, he goes to work for Jessica, who with Hardman has just taken control of the firm in an overnight coup. Harvey and Donna have a tryst during the brief period she is not working for him, and they agree to conceal this thereafter. At the same time, college senior Mike receives an acceptance letter to Harvard Law school, but later sells answers to a math exam in order to repay a drug debt for his roommate Trevor. When Trevor is caught, Mike confesses, thinking the punishment will be light. It turns out the recipient of the exam answers was the dean's daughter, so the dean expels Mike from college and notifies Harvard Law of the transgressions. In the present, Harvey tells Jessica about his own coup deal with Darby and says he no longer wants the managing partnership, but Jessica rebuffs him. Harvey admits to Donna that he is bothered by her current fling with Stephen. Mike welcomes Rachel back from her Stanford interview, and promises to support her in whatever she chooses. Harvey and Mike call a bluff by Cameron and believe they have won acquittal for Ava. But Cameron still intends to go to trial since he now has the colonel as a witness, saying that Stephen "led me right to him."
35	7	"She's Mine"	Anton Cropper	Paul Redford	August 27, 2013	2.79
Ava's defense is now in disarray in part because she concealed a phone call from Colonel Moriga, who is now available for questioning and maintains that Ava paid him for the murders. Jessica takes charge of the case and (against Harvey's advice) pursues the theory that Nick gave the fatal orders. Mike visits Cameron in his office, ostensibly to pursue a plea deal but actually to memorize documents to find out what Cameron has on Nick. Stephen continues to meddle in the case, and after Donna determines from the copier counter that he hid seven pages of Moriga's testimony, she breaks off their arrangement. Mike determines that Stephen was on a rugby team with the Colonel 20 years ago and personally paid him the bribe money while giving the orders for murders, without the knowledge of either Ava or Nick. Harvey beats up Stephen in the men's room. Meanwhile, Louis is reluctant to return his feline house guest to Nigel, who has returned early from Hong Kong. He challenges Nigel for custody of the cat in a mock trial before the associates, with Rachel as his "attorney". Nigel has a trick up his sleeve, bringing Harold to the mock trial to testify against Louis, but it backfires, resulting in Louis being awarded custody. On Rachel's urging, Louis accepts Nigel's offer to return supervision of the associates to Louis in exchange for the cat. A grateful Louis then informs Rachel that she has been admitted to Columbia Law School.
36	8	"Endgame"	Michael Smith	Justin Peacock	September 3, 2013	3.52
Jessica and Harvey confront Darby with the fact that Stephen ordered the murders, and Darby admits he found out after the fact and did nothing, for fear it would harm Ava. They get him to fire Stephen, but what he is honestly able to testify cannot prove Stephen's guilt. When Harvey calls Stephen to the stand, he fails to convince Cameron of Stephen's guilt and reduces Ava's chances still further. Harvey appeals to Cameron's desire for justice as well as victory, having Mike bring in Clifford (an innocent man that Cameron had convicted for murder). Darby advises Jessica to put aside her anger, and she does, reconciling with Harvey and working with him on an ultimate solution to Ava's problem. Darby agrees to plead to obstruction of justice (getting five years' probation) and testify against Stephen. Cameron takes the surer conviction and drops charges against Ava, while Donna watches Stephen get arrested for murder. At the last moment, Darby discovers that with his probation he also loses his license to practice law in the US, therefore allowing Jessica to push for a dissolution of the merger. Back at the office, the now cat-less Louis lashes out against the associates, then goes to Harold's office to berate him about his testimony in the mock trial. Louis and Harold enter an escalating battle of legal action and intimidation, and Rachel confronts Louis over the depth of his resentment. He explains that his failure to train Harold reminds him of his own failure and the bullying he suffered. Rachel offers that Louis has bullied Harold in the same way. When Harold finally concedes the battle, Louis instead agrees to a compromise that will make Harold look good, swearing Rachel to secrecy about this unusual mercy.
37	9	"Bad Faith"	Christopher Misiano	Ethan Drogin	September 10, 2013	2.95
Work begins on the dissolution of the Pearson Darby Specter firm. Louis convinces Jessica to let him handle the negotiations, on the grounds that Jessica and Harvey would be too emotionally involved. This backfires when Darby appoints Nigel to negotiate with Louis, as Louis (provoked by Nigel's lack of affection for the cat) shuts the door on Harvey and Jessica's plan to defeat Darby. Meanwhile, Mike asks Rachel to move in with him (to the apartment he acquired for his late grandmother), but the two begin to fight over each other's irritating habits. Louis and Katrina have a plan to increase the firm's business with Gianapoulos Holdings, which would increase their side's share of the settlement with Darby. Gianapoulos' aide is impressed with Louis' financial wits, but tells him he lacks the stature to have the proposal considered. Harvey sends Mike to ask Robert Zane to pay the Folsom Foods settlement immediately in return for a discount. Zane refuses until Mike invokes his relationship with Rachel; Zane is amused and impressed with Mike's chutzpah but Rachel is enraged when she learns of it. She tells Mike that she has been admitted to Stanford. Darby appoints Scottie as his new negotiator, with the promise of a named partnership if she wins. She pleads with Harvey to exclude the Folsom Foods settlement from the negotiations, mentioning how she helped him with the Hessington Oil case and their feelings for each other, and promising that she will not go after more money for Darby. Harvey convinces Jessica to agree to this, arguing that the whole firm will suffer from having Darby as an enemy. Soon after, it is revealed that Hessington Oil has fired the firm, and Harvey is enraged, believing that Scottie played him. Encouraged by Katrina, Louis shows his plan that was rejected by Gianapoulos' aide to Harvey, and asks him to present it. Harvey, still furious over Scottie's apparent manipulation, compliments Louis before taking him along to meet with Gianapoulos, who agrees to move his business to the Pearson Specter side of the firm. But Harvey then learns the Hessington Oil firing was in fact the work of Ava alone, as she is also suing the still-undissolved Pearson Darby Specter firm for malpractice.
38	10	"Stay"	Kevin Bray	Rick Muirragui	September 17, 2013	3.16
Ava's attorney for her malpractice suit is Travis Tanner, whose strategy is to get Harvey to settle by attacking Scottie both personally and professionally. He gets Stephen to sign an affidavit claiming she was complicit in the murders, but Donna is able to neutralize this, visiting Stephen in prison and getting him to admit he lied, unaware that he is being recorded. Later Harvey interrupts Ava's deposition to speak with her directly, apologizing for his failings but insisting that everything he did was part of a zealous defense of her interests. She agrees to withdraw the suit. Harvey tells Scottie that he wants not only to work with her, but to have her in his life. Jessica learns of Mike and Rachel's relationship, is concerned about Robert Zane learning the firm's business, and tells Mike she will fire him unless he gets Rachel to sign an affidavit saying that she knew of Mike's fraud. Rachel visits Jessica and signs it, but asks her in return to waive the firm's "Harvard rule" so that she can apply for an associate's position on her graduation. After initially threatening to break up with her if she goes to Stanford, Mike is again supportive of Rachel, and she decides to go to Columbia in spite of her rational analysis in favor of Stanford. Louis again gets romantically involved with Sheila Sazs while attempting to lure a top Harvard Law candidate for an associate position, and he later declares he wants to be "exclusive" with Sheila. She briefly leaves Louis alone in a room which contains the records of everyone who ever attended Harvard Law School; he is surprised to find no folder on Mike.
39	11	"Buried Secrets"	Cherie Nowlan	Erica Lipez	March 6, 2014	2.27
Things get complicated when Harvey mixes business with pleasure, getting Scottie a job at the firm. Scottie has to convince Jessica to waive the half-million dollar partner's buy-in, which she thinks she does by gaining Michael Phelps as a client for the firm. Still, Harvey isn’t completely honest with Scottie. Painful memories plague Mike, as he uses a case to exorcise demons against the man who paid his grandmother a meager settlement after his parents' death. Mike and Rachel decide to move in together. Meanwhile, Donna does her best to keep Mike’s secret from Louis, who is investigating. He seems satisfied after receiving a copy of Mike's (falsified) Harvard transcript, until finding an anomaly — an A+ grade from a professor who is notorious for not handing out such grades.
40	12	"Yesterday's Gone"	Anton Cropper	Genevieve Sparling	March 13, 2014	2.27
Mike confesses to Louis that he falsified one A+ in Professor Gerard's Legal Ethics class, rather than telling Louis about his entire fabricated Harvard career. Louis invites Gerard (Stephen Macht) to give a lecture and says that he will expose Mike unless Mike confesses and apologizes to the professor. Harvey fails to coerce Gerard into canceling the lecture, but prevails on Louis to let it go, citing his own friendship with Louis and Mike's fitness for and love of the law. Meanwhile, Jessica's ex-husband Quentin has died, leaving Harvey and Jessica as co-executors. Quentin's second wife Lisa wants to sell his drug company, which Jessica opposes. Prompted by Harvey, she learns that Lisa's main goal is to ensure that Quentin's research leads to the release of a drug to the market. Jessica asks the buying company to guarantee this, whereupon the sale offer is withdrawn and Lisa's lawyer challenges Jessica's status as executor. Jessica cannot truthfully testify that Quentin was of sound mind when he appointed her, but she nevertheless convinces the court to uphold her status.
41	13	"Moot Point"	Kevin Bray	Daniel Arkin	March 20, 2014	2.35
As a gift to Harvey for helping him with Louis, Mike asks him to first chair a case because the opposing counsel, A. Elliot Stemple, is someone Harvey has never been able to beat. Stemple hints that he will be able to fix the case, and later confides in Harvey that he did the same in the two previous cases he won. But this is a ruse to get Harvey and Mike to bring evidence that works in favor of Stemple's client. Mike is able to find other evidence that turns the tables on Stemple and gets him to settle. Mike's celebration is short-lived, however, when Jessica says New York Lawyer magazine wants to interview the man responsible for making a Fortune 500 company publicly admit wrongdoing, and she says Mike's name must be removed from the case to avoid publicity that might lead to interrogation of his status. Thus, Mike is reminded that his career will always be working in the background. Elsewhere, Scottie manipulates Jessica into giving her a case that belonged to Louis, causing a rivalry between them. Louis and Katrina are unsuccessful in trying to gain the case back, and Louis fears his standing at the firm will be affected by the appearance that Scottie was able to bully him. Ultimately feeling he is left without recourse, he goes to Harvey to cash in the favor and get Scottie to give his case back. Harvey broaches the topic with Scottie, initially framing it as a genial request, which she rebuffs. Scottie correctly guesses that it has something to do with the favor Louis did for Harvey; she demands Harvey disclose what the favor was in exchange for her cooperation. Harvey is forced to refuse, invoking his seniority and implicitly making clear that her compliance is not up for discussion. The two realize that there are times when Harvey will have to speak to Scottie as a named partner, rather than as a boyfriend.
42	14	"Heartburn"	James Whitmore, Jr.	Aaron Korsh & Erica Lipez	March 27, 2014	2.53
Louis suffers a heart attack in court. After recovering, he asks Sheila to marry him and she accepts. But when discussing their lives after marriage, the two find they want different things. After a meeting with Mike and Harvey, a Tony Gianapolis employee named Jonathan (Louis' client from earlier in the season) approaches Mike saying he wants out of Tony's company and plans to take his investment banking algorithm with him. Mike offers Jonathan off-the-books advice on how to get out of what appears to be an ironclad non-compete agreement, which gets him in hot water with Harvey because Gionopoulos is Harvey's client. Mike also discusses with Harvey his desire to go to law school and be legit, but Harvey says the only way that could work is if Mike attends law school away from the big cities and hangs up his shingle in a small town -- essentially knocking Mike out of "the big leagues". Jonathan gets out of his agreement with Tony and, impressed with Mike's intelligence, offers him a job that does not involve Mike being a lawyer. Meanwhile, Rachel tries to get Jessica to honor a verbal agreement Louis previously made that included then-Pearson Hardman paying Rachel's law school tuition.
43	15	"Know When to Fold 'Em"	Anton Cropper	Jon Cowan	April 3, 2014	2.50
A heartbroken Louis calls in sick and instructs Katrina to cover for him. Harvey and Scottie appear to patch things up over the incident with Louis' case. A man named James Quelling comes up with a "bullshit claim" against Marathon Footwear, a Pearson Specter client that is supposed to go public in a week. Meanwhile Mike tells Rachel about the job offer he got from Jonathan, but doesn't tell Harvey yet. While negotiating with Quelling, Harvey learns of his gambling habit. He later beats Quelling in a high-stakes poker game, and tells his opponent he'll leave him his winnings if he agrees to drop the case. Mike informs Harvey about Jonathan's offer, and is concerned when Harvey calmly tells him he should take the job. But Harvey is actually very worked up, causing him to snap at Scottie. Quelling returns the next day after discovering the agreement Mike made with Harold to pay off witnesses in the Hessington case, and he plans to take it to the New York Bar Association the next day (which would expose Mike) unless Harvey settles for the higher amount. Charles Van Dyke, Jessica's former name partner, appears out of the blue, making claims that his dividend check should be higher and suspecting fraud in Pearson Specter's books. Jessica asks for Louis' assistance, but Katrina wants to respect Louis' wishes that she cover for him. She tries to resolve the issue with the help of Rachel. Van Dyke sees through the comeback attempt designed by Katrina and Rachel, and makes a move to strongarm Jessica. Jessica fires Katrina, but after Rachel explains the situation, Jessica appeals to Louis to help her fight Van Dyke. Mike tells Harvey he plans to leave Pearson Specter. Harvey tells Donna he wants to tell Scottie about Mike because her anger over him keeping secrets is eating him up inside. But Donna convinces Harvey that Scottie will always be angry about something. Mike returns to Harvey's office saying he has paid his hacker to make him a member of the Bar, and he now wants to stay.
44	16	"No Way Out"	Michael Smith	Aaron Korsh & Daniel Arkin	April 10, 2014	2.40
The house of cards Harvey and Mike have built may finally come tumbling down when Mike is taken in for questioning by US Attorney Eric Woodall. It seems that Woodall has got wind of the Hessington settlement, and the tenacious attorney smells blood. But as Woodall soon makes clear, he doesn’t really want Mike; it’s Harvey he’s after, and he’s willing to make a deal with his protégé in order to get him. Mike has no intention of turning on his mentor, but as he and Harvey scramble to cover their bases it becomes evident that they still have a major liability on their hands, and his name is Harold Gunderson. At the same time, news of Mike’s brush with Woodall causes the employees of Pearson Specter to take a hard look in the mirror, and they may not like what they see. Meanwhile, when Mike and Harold are arrested, Mike hopes his timid ex-colleague will toe the line. But Woodall is a man who gets what he wants at any cost, and Harold starts to crack under the pressure. Eventually, Louis convinces him not to confess. At the end of the episode, Mike tells Harvey that he took Jonathan Sidwell's job offer.

== Ratings ==
No.	Title	Original air date	Time slot (EST)	Viewers (in millions)	Rating (Adults 18–49)	18-49 Rank on Cable	Note
1	"The Arrangement"	July 16, 2013	Thursdays; 9:00 p.m.	2.93	1.1	#7	
2	"I Want You to Want Me"	July 23, 2013	Thursdays; 9:00 p.m.	2.88	1.0	#11	
3	"Unfinished Business"	July 30, 2013	Thursdays; 9:00 p.m.	2.47	0.9	#17	
4	"Conflict of Interest"	August 6, 2013	Thursdays; 9:00 p.m.	2.99	1.1	#12	
5	"Shadow of a Doubt"	August 13, 2013	Thursdays; 9:00 p.m.	2.79	0.9	#11	
6	"The Other Time"	August 20, 2013	Thursdays; 9:00 p.m.	2.76	1.0	#12	
7	"She's Mine"	August 27, 2013	Thursdays; 9:00 p.m.	2.79	1.0	#15	
8	"Endgame"	September 3, 2013	Thursdays; 9:00 p.m.	3.52	1.2	#4	
9	"Bad Faith"	September 10, 2013	Thursdays; 9:00 p.m.	2.95	0.9	#15	
10	"Stay"	September 17, 2013	Thursdays; 9:00 p.m.	3.16	1.0	#8	
11	"Buried Secrets"	March 6, 2014	Thursdays; 9:00 p.m.	2.27	0.8	#5	
12	"Yesterday's Gone"	March 13, 2014	Thursdays; 9:00 p.m.	2.27	0.7	#3	
13	"Moot Point"	March 20, 2014	Thursdays; 9:00 p.m.	2.35	0.7	#3	
14	"Heartburn"	March 27, 2014	Thursdays; 9:00 p.m.	2.53	0.7	#5	
15	"Know When to Fold 'Em"	April 3, 2014	Thursdays; 9:00 p.m.	2.50	0.8	#3	
16	"No Way Out"	April 10, 2014	Thursdays; 9:00 p.m.	2.40	0.7	#3	
