= Suits season 6 =

Suits
- Season 6
- DVD cover
- Starring: Gabriel Macht; Patrick J. Adams; Rick Hoffman; Meghan Markle; Sarah Rafferty; Gina Torres
- No. of episodes: 16

Release
- Original network: USA Network
- Original release: July 13, 2016 – March 1, 2017

Season chronology
- ← Previous; Season 5 Next → Season 7

The sixth season of the American legal drama Suits was ordered on July 1, 2015, and began airing on USA Network in the United States July 13, 2016. The season is produced by Hypnotic Films & Television and Universal Cable Productions, and the executive producers are Doug Liman, David Bartis, and series creator Aaron Korsh. The season has six series regulars playing employees at the fictional Pearson Specter Litt law firm in Manhattan: Gabriel Macht, Patrick J. Adams, Rick Hoffman, Meghan Markle, Sarah Rafferty, and Gina Torres.

Gina Torres left the show following the summer season due to her contract being up, and she starred in ABC's The Catch. She returned for the season finale and was still credited as main cast for the episode. She further went on to star in the Suits spinoff, Pearson.

== Cast ==
=== Regular cast ===
- Gabriel Macht as Harvey Specter
- Patrick J. Adams as Mike Ross
- Rick Hoffman as Louis Litt
- Meghan Markle as Rachel Zane
- Sarah Rafferty as Donna Paulsen
- Gina Torres as Jessica Pearson

=== Recurring cast ===
- Aloma Wright as Gretchen Bodinski
- Amanda Schull as Katrina Bennett
- Wendell Pierce as Robert Zane
- David Reale as Benjamin
- Leslie Hope as Anita Gibbs
- Paul Schulze as Frank Gallo
- Erik Palladino as Kevin Miller
- Malcolm-Jamal Warner as Julius Rowe
- Glenn Plummer as Leonard Bailey
- Ian Reed Kesler as Stu Buzzini
- Carly Pope as Tara Messer
- Neal McDonough as Sean Cahill
- Alan Rosenberg as William Sutter
- David Hewlett as Nathan Burnes
- Jordan Johnson-Hinds as Oliver

== Episodes ==
No. overall	No. in season	Title	Directed by	Written by	Original release date	U.S. viewers (millions)
77	1	"To Trouble"	Silver Tree	Aaron Korsh	July 13, 2016	1.85
The episode picks up immediately after the previous season's finale, as Mike enters the Federal prison in Danbury to face his two-year sentence for fraud. The other major characters spend the night at Pearson Specter Litt, and learn that the firm is being sued in a $100 million class-action lawsuit for every case Mike worked on. When they learn that all their client files were stolen, the three name partners agree to go all in for the sake of the firm. In jail, Mike discovers a new enemy in Frank Gallo, an inmate who has a great deal of influence with the guards and who has a vendetta against Harvey. Gallo tricks Mike into telling him his entire story, including the reason he is in prison, as well as Rachel's phone number, before revealing his true intentions and promising Mike further trouble.
78	2	"Accounts Payable"	Michael Smith	Ethan Drogin	July 20, 2016	1.65
Mike meets his actual cellmate, Kevin Miller, and is wary of being tricked a second time. Donna obtains visitation rights for Rachel, but Mike gets into a fight with Gallo that leads to his visitation rights being revoked for two weeks. When Harvey visits Mike in prison as his lawyer and learns about Gallo, he reveals that he put Gallo away for racketeering for 15 years, three times the usual sentence, because he couldn't get him on a murder charge for lack of admissible evidence. Rachel keeps receiving text messages from Gallo posing as Mike and learns the situation from Harvey, who hopes Sean Cahill can help. As the cost for allowing the settlement of the class-action lawsuit to move forward, A. Elliott Stemple demands Harvey's duck painting, a clearly prized possession painted by his mother. In the midst of the firm's money problems, Jack Soloff demands his buy-in back. Jessica refuses but helps him by negotiating for his buy-in with Robert Zane's firm. Kevin begins to earn Mike's trust by saving him from being shivved by Gallo.
79	3	"Back on the Map"	Cherie Nowlan	Rick Muirragui	July 27, 2016	1.78
Mike tries to stay out of trouble to please Julius, the prison psychologist, but Kevin gets attacked. Sean Cahill informs Harvey that Gallo is an informant and will not be transferred. Through Mike, Harvey informs Gallo that he'll be eligible for parole in six weeks. Jessica forces Harvey to meet with William Sutter as a potential client; Harvey refuses to do business with a shady businessman, but Jessica demands a high-profile client for the firm's future. When Harvey tries to sign Nathan Burns instead, Sutter interferes. Louis regretfully books an office tenant to pay the bills and clashes with Stu Buzzini, head of an investment company, as soon as they move in, but Harvey makes a deal with the investor to stave off Sutter, cementing them as new neighbors and gaining Burns as a client. Now in law school, Rachel engages in a debate with a classmate and uses the skills learned from her work experience to win. Cahill offers a deal for Mike if he can get Kevin to inform on his father-in-law and if he does then Mike will have an early release.
80	4	"Turn"	Christopher Misiano	Daniel Arkin	August 3, 2016	1.81
Mike initially rejects Cahill's offer, but Harvey and Cahill covertly sneak him out of prison for a few hours. Cahill believes this is to give him a chance to convince Mike, but Harvey sends Mike to Rachel behind Cahill's back. Mike tells her about the deal and agrees to accept it. Rachel hears the story of a death row inmate who claims that he is innocent and impresses her professor with her fast work assembling evidence. Stu's traders annoy both Louis and Jessica, but Jessica regains control of the office and lands the company as a new client. Louis consults architect Tara Messer about remodeling the office to separate him from the traders and instantly falls in love with her, but Jessica forbids him from pursuing the project. In order to stay close to her, he hires her to remodel his nonexistent summer home.
81	5	"Trust"	Kate Dennis	Kyle Long	August 10, 2016	1.51
Louis and Donna work together to find him a house in the Hamptons to cover up his lie to Tara. Rachel's professor informs her that the Innocence Project case she chose doesn't meet his requirements to take it on. Rachel doesn't take the news well and tries to get Jessica's support, convincing her that the pro bono case will be good for Pearson Specter Litt's tattered reputation. Mike tells the prison warden Harvey's plan to get him out of prison early and is warned about the dangers of gathering evidence. Mike also confronts Kevin to get him to reveal why he's in prison. Kevin tells him about a drunk driving incident which followed an argument with his wife, but does not disclose the subject of the argument.
82	6	"Spain"	Silver Tree	Genevieve Sparling	August 17, 2016	1.68
Mike has a nightmare that Kevin killed Rachel in a car crash. He is relieved the dream isn't true, but because of his parents' death, he isn't comfortable knowing Kevin did something similar. He continues to see counselor Julius Rowe, but Rowe isn't happy with Mike's mindset toward his imprisonment. Louis and Donna arrange a house tour with Tara but their lie is discovered. However, when Louis admits that he did so much to spend time with her, not to scam her, she is impressed and agrees to a date. In the courtroom, Harvey has taken Sutter's case, with Cahill prosecuting Sutter for insider trading. Harvey arranges a mock deposition and Kevin argues with Sutter. When Mike pursues the subject, Kevin discloses that he developed a trading program algorithm, but Sutter never used it other than as a cover. Kevin's wife, Sutter's daughter, knew about what was happening, and he doesn't want to implicate her. Rachel informs Jessica that Leonard Bailey's execution date has been set.
83	7	"Shake the Trees"	Anton Cropper	Rick Muirragui & Sandra Silverstein	August 24, 2016	1.83
Rachel and Jessica ask for the execution to be postponed so that they can locate Leonard's missing alibi witness. They are given a week and Rachel enlists her father's help, but the witness is dead, leaving them with no options. On their dinner date, Tara tells Louis she is in a long-distance relationship that allows her to see other people, and Louis is not sure how to respond. Harvey fails to find a guilty party among Sutter's employees, but Louis, with help from Stu's financial database, locates the banker who is the common factor in Sutter's insider trades. Just when the case seems solid, the banker cuts a separate deal with the SEC, and although Cahill agrees to honor his deal with Mike his superiors at the SEC back out of the deal at the last second.
84	8	"Borrowed Time"	Gabriel Macht	Sharyn Rothstein	August 31, 2016	1.88
Jessica plans to delay Leonard's execution by having Leonard's infirm aunt, who raised him, say she is now unable to travel to attend. Rachel obtains the affidavit, but the woman's belief in Leonard's guilt and subsequent refusal to attend devastate him. Jessica has a chance meeting with Jeff Malone and is interested in reviving their relationship, but Jeff is moving to Chicago and knows that Jessica cannot give up the firm to follow him. Louis has another date with Tara where he tells her that he cannot share her with another man, but despite their growing intimacy, when Tara's boyfriend decides to visit neither knows what to do. Harvey deposes Sutter's banker and establishes that he dealt only with Kevin's wife, Jill, and cannot implicate Sutter directly. Cahill indicts Jill, and when Sutter refuses to make a deal to keep her out of jail, Jill agrees to turn on Sutter in return for immunity. Harvey explains to Sutter that both Sutter and Kevin were his clients, and he was free to weigh their competing interests and negotiate the best possible deal. Rachel gets the news that Mike's getting released just as she discovers a way to re-open Leonard's case.
85	9	"The Hand That Feeds You"	Roger Kumble	Daniel Arkin	September 7, 2016	1.87
Mike learns that Cahill is seizing Jill's and Kevin's assets beyond the proceeds of the insider trading. He threatens Cahill with an abuse of power lawsuit for Kevin's sake but only jeopardizes his own deal. When Harvey follows through with his promise to win parole for Gallo, Cameron Dennis intervenes, using Mike's testimony of Gallo's extortion and threats to get Kevin released as recompense. Mike delayed his own release one day in order to film Gallo threatening and attacking him in his cell. Donna helps Louis cope until Tara visits, telling him that she turned down her boyfriend's proposal in order to continue dating Louis. Meanwhile, Rachel asks Leonard's public defender to testify that she heard about his alibi, arguing that because the witness is dead this is not hearsay. The judge agrees to reopen the case on the grounds of inadequate representation and the DA offers Bailey a deal to get him released after seven more years in prison. Jessica advises him to accept, but he opts to fight for full exoneration. Together Harvey and Rachel meet Mike as he is released.
86	10	"P.S.L."	Kevin Bray	Aaron Korsh & Genevieve Sparling	September 14, 2016	1.92
Harvey offers Mike a position at the firm as a consultant, with the same salary he was making as a junior partner. Thanks to Robert Zane's warning, Harvey learns that Jim Reynolds' board is trying to remove him because of rumors that Harvey sold out Sutter to get Mike released. He goes straight to Sutter as the source of the rumors, threatening him to recant his statements. With Mike's help, Rachel and Jessica exonerate Leonard Bailey. Throughout the trial, Jessica recalls her parents separating because of her father's work, and her father's anger when she decided to go to Harvard Law rather than become a doctor. Robert Zane approaches Jessica with an offer to merge their firms. Tara tells Louis that she is pregnant by her ex-boyfriend, and he proposes to her. Stu gives notice that his company is relocating, leaving the office empty again. Harvey and Louis celebrate keeping Reynolds, but Jessica informs them she is leaving. She asks Jeff Malone if she can follow him to Chicago. Note: this is the last appearance of Gina Torres (Jessica Pearson) as a series regular.
87	11	"She's Gone"	Patrick J. Adams	Aaron Korsh & Rick Muirragui	January 25, 2017	1.37
Rachel's father offers her an associate position, but she stands by Harvey and Louis despite serious concerns regarding the ethical conduct evaluation required to pass the bar. Louis and Harvey's management starts off well, but Zane's repeated merger offer sparks Louis to drastic measures to prove his leadership ability. Mike refuses Harvey's consultant job but, when every job application he fills out asks if he is a convicted felon, he doubts his chances of finding anything. Although Father Walker offers him a substitute teacher position, when one of the students' parents learn of his criminal record, Mike loses even that opportunity. Louis, with Gretchen and Katrina's help, picks a fight with Zane by trying to poach associates and clients, but Katrina convinces him that he is going too far against someone who is trying to help. Harvey asks Anita Gibbs to give Mike a good review if he returns to law, earning her distaste and Mike's anger. He takes it out on Louis, proving that neither of them is ready to be managing partner. Gretchen convinces Louis to give Rachel a formal job offer and Donna tells Harvey that, with his corporate family falling apart, he needs to reconnect with his real family.
88	12	"The Painting"	Gregor Jordan	Sharyn Rothstein & Sandra Silverstein	February 1, 2017	1.53
Harvey flashes back seven years to his father’s funeral, the last time he spoke to his mother, who gave a eulogy crediting Gordon as a father. Harvey attends the gathering after, but the presence of Bobby, Lily's affair partner and eventual spouse, caused Harvey to reject her completely. In the present, while he reconnects with his brother Marcus’s family, he later attempts forgiveness over dinner, but is offended when Lily offers to forgive him for his absence. After criticizing each other, he leaves in disgust, and Bobby later threatens Harvey for devastating Lily, but leaves when Harvey dares him to hit him. The next day, Marcus reveals he hid his past cancer relapse from Harvey to avoid family conflict (since Harvey paid for Marcus's initial treatment and refused Lily's attempt to repay him), and that Lily and Bobby took care of him and their grandchildren. Shaken by his brother's mistrust, Harvey finds his mother at her studio, and apologizes for their fight. When Lily sees that Marcus' secrecy affected Harvey, she owns up fully for using Harvey's silence in the past and alienating him since. Harvey affirms that he doesn't hate her, and they finally reconcile. Meanwhile, Mike is suddenly offered a job at a legal clinic that recognizes his talent and appreciates his honesty. He learns he will be managing the staff. Facing hostility, Mike tells them the truth to prove he isn’t "slumming it" because he couldn’t hack it in corporate law. He helps law student Marissa with a housing case, despite the frustration of being unable to represent the client himself, and uses his own money to buy the client time. Louis steps up to manage one of Harvey’s clients in his absence. Louis and Harvey agree to be interim managing partners and leave the firm's name as Pearson Specter Litt.
89	13	"Teeth, Nose, Teeth"	Silver Tree	Kyle Long	February 8, 2017	1.28
Rachel and Mike make plans to hold their wedding and Louis tries to cope with Tara’s ex being in their baby’s life. Rachel is derailed by a letter stating that she’s already been rejected by the bar on ethical grounds. When Harvey goes to make it right, a member of the ethics board, Craig Seidel (Michael B. Silver) insinuates that he will deny Rachel unless Harvey sues his business competitor Velocity. Louis does the research and gets Harvey the leverage to ensure support for both Rachel and Mike in front of the bar. The housing case at the legal clinic escalates, but Mike’s team members, Marissa and Oliver, seem too inexperienced to handle it. With Marissa out of town, Oliver freezing in court, Mike forbidden from acting as an attorney, and a boss who is tired of putting in overtime, Mike feels he can’t help anyone from his current position. When the judge dismisses the case, Mike agrees to Harvey’s plan. In the office, IT guy Benjamin shows Donna a device that mimics her clever quips and proposes a business partnership, but she realizes that her heart is as much a part of her as her wit and turns him down.
90	14	"Admission of Guilt"	Michael Smith	Ethan Drogin	February 15, 2017	1.21
Louis and Tara get to know each other better. Meanwhile, Mike uses the legal clinic to go after Velocity Data Solutions. Harvey demands that Seidel schedule a hearing for Mike before the ethics board as soon as possible. When Mike has to bring Pearson Specter Litt into the case, Oliver gets to work with the firm’s new associates, but others are suspicious of Mike’s motives and Oliver urges him to come clean to Nathan, their boss at the clinic, upon learning Mike has more riding on this than initially stated. Harvey learns that Seidel has more at stake in the Velocity lawsuit than he revealed and refuses to take his demands. While helping Mike, Harvey neglects to support Louis with the firm’s clients, so Louis brings in Rachel and Katrina who has just rejoined Pearson Specter Litt and has been appointed as the newest Junior Partner to help him. Donna keeps experimenting with Benjamin’s project, but has trouble explaining empathy to him.
91	15	"Quid Pro Quo"	Maurice Marable	Aaron Korsh & Daniel Arkin	February 22, 2017	1.25
Donna takes Benjamin’s “The Donna” to Stu before shopping around to other investors. Mike pulls out of the deal with Seidel to ensure his clients get paid but, with Velocity putting pressure on the firm’s clients, Pearson Specter Litt withdraws from the lawsuit, leaving Mike with no leverage. Rachel and Harvey use Seidel’s situation to find a new opening, but Mike wants nothing to do with Harvey’s less-than-legal methods. Through Rachel, Mike realizes that he can’t give up being a lawyer, so he and Harvey use evidence of corporate espionage to force Velocity’s CEO into a settlement offer and reopen the deal to get Mike in front of the bar. When Donna and Benjamin meet with investors, she learns that they only respect Harvey’s name, not hers. She decides to take Stu’s offer, because he sees her as an equal. Louis worries about telling Tara that he knew Mike’s secret and used it to demand he become a name partner. Even though Rachel convinces him that telling her is better than her finding out later, Tara gets upset, Louis argues with her, and she walks out.
92	16	"Character and Fitness"	Roger Kumble	Genevieve Sparling	March 1, 2017	1.13
Tara questions her future with Louis, knowing that he took his anger out on her. At the clinic, Mike gives Nathan their cut of the settlement, smoothing over his request for a few days off, but renewing Oliver's mistrust of his intentions. When Mike comes clean, Nathan opts to fire him for his shady deals, but Oliver defends him. Mike tells Harvey he still doesn’t want to work at Pearson Specter Litt when he becomes a lawyer, but discussion is curtailed when Anita Gibbs takes a seat on the board for Mike’s hearing. Donna brings Louis a patent negotiation that turns into a lawsuit against Donna’s new business. She confides to Harvey that she wants more than money, but doesn’t know what that means yet. Mike enlists Julius, his prison counselor, to speak as his character witness; Harvey tries to remove Anita Gibbs, who offers him the endorsement Mike needs in return for Harvey's getting disbarred. However, Mike refuses to accept the deal. Jessica appears at the hearing and reminds Gibbs of a time she showed mercy. Mike is accepted while Jessica gets disbarred in New York for being the only one who knew about Mike's fraud. Tara breaks up with Louis. Mike agrees to work for Harvey again in return for funding the clinic for two years, extra money for him and Rachel as a soon-to-be married couple, maintaining a relationship with the clinic, amending the 'Harvard rule' of only hiring Harvard graduates as associates at the firm and getting Harvey's office, who in turn will take over Jessica Pearson's.

== Ratings ==
No.	Title	Original air date	Time slot (EST)	Viewers (in millions)	Rating (Adults 18–49)	18-49 Rank on Cable	Note
1	"To Trouble"	July 13, 2016	Wednesdays; 10:00 p.m.	1.85	0.5	#3	
2	"Accounts Payable"	July 20, 2016	Wednesdays; 10:00 p.m.	1.65	0.5	#10	
3	"Back on the Map"	July 27, 2016	Wednesdays; 10:00 p.m.	1.78	0.5	#11	
4	"Turn"	August 3, 2016	Wednesdays; 10:00 p.m.	1.81	0.5	#5	
5	"Trust"	August 10, 2016	Wednesdays; 10:00 p.m.	1.51	0.4	#8	
6	"Spain"	August 17, 2016	Wednesdays; 10:00 p.m.	1.68	0.4	#6	
7	"Shake the Trees"	August 24, 2016	Wednesdays; 10:00 p.m.	1.83	0.4	#9	
8	"Borrowed Time"	August 31, 2016	Wednesdays; 10:00 p.m.	1.88	0.4	#6	
9	"The Hand That Feeds You"	September 7, 2016	Wednesdays; 10:00 p.m.	2.89	0.5	#8	
10	"P.S.L."	September 14, 2016	Wednesdays; 10:00 p.m.	1.92	0.5	#8	
11	"She's Gone"	January 25, 2017	Wednesdays; 10:00 p.m.	1.37	0.3	#34	
12	"The Painting"	February 1, 2017	Wednesdays; 10:00 p.m.	1.53	0.3	#29	
13	"Teeth, Nose, Teeth"	February 8, 2017	Wednesdays; 10:00 p.m.	TBD	TBD	TBD	—N/a
14	"Admission of Guilt"	February 15, 2017	Wednesdays; 10:00 p.m.	TBD	TBD	TBD	—N/a
15	"Quid Pro Quo"	February 22, 2017	Wednesdays; 10:00 p.m.	TBD	TBD	TBD	—N/a
16	"Character and Fitness"	March 1, 2017	Wednesdays; 10:00 p.m.	TBD	TBD	TBD	—N/a
