= Suits LA =

2025 American legal drama TV series

- Genre: Legal drama
- Created by: Aaron Korsh
- Showrunner: Aaron Korsh
- Starring: Stephen Amell; Lex Scott Davis; Josh McDermitt; Bryan Greenberg
- Music by: Christopher Tyng
- Country of origin: United States
- Original language: English
- No. of seasons: 1
- No. of episodes: 13

Production
- Executive producers: Victoria Mahoney; Gene Klein; David Bartis; Doug Liman; Aaron Korsh; Rick Muirragui; Jon Cowan; Genevieve Sparling; Anton L. Cropper
- Producers: John G. Lenic; Ronald D. Chong; Stephen Amell
- Production locations: Vancouver, British Columbia; Los Angeles, California
- Cinematography: Gregory Middleton; Joe Gallagher
- Editors: Dan Rovetto; Peter Forslund; Sandra McCallig
- Production companies: Untitled Korsh Company; Hypnotic; Universal Content Productions

Original release
- Network: NBC
- Release: February 23 – May 18, 2025

Related
- Suits

Suits LA is an American legal drama television series created by Aaron Korsh for NBC. It is the second spin-off of Suits, following 2019's Pearson, and premiered on February 23, 2025. In May 2025, the series was cancelled after one season.

== Premise ==
Ex-New York City federal prosecutor turned Los Angeles entertainment lawyer Ted Black and his Black Lane Law firm represent powerful clients in LA while Ted and his associates navigate personal and professional challenges.

== Cast and characters ==
=== Main ===
- Stephen Amell as Ted Black, a former federal prosecutor in New York City who decides to restart his legal career by becoming an entertainment lawyer in Los Angeles with the Black Lane Law firm
- Lex Scott Davis as Erica Rollins, Ted's law partner at Black & Associates
- Josh McDermitt as Stuart Lane, criminal defense lawyer and Ted's former partner, who betrays him by leaving their firm, taking some of the firm's lawyers and clients with him
- Bryan Greenberg as Rick Dodsen

=== Recurring ===
- Maggie Grace as Amanda Stevens, a pro bono attorney who rents an office at Ted and Erica's law firm. Ted hires her as the head of criminal defense after he sees what she can do for his law firm.
- Troy Winbush as Kevin, a private investigator who works with Ted
- Alice Lee as Leah Power, an associate lawyer at Ted and Erica's law firm
- Rachelle Goulding as Samantha Railsback, Ted's ex-girlfriend who is now Stuart's law partner
- Azita Ghanizada as Rosalyn, a secretary at Ted and Erica's law firm
- Kevin Weisman as Lester Thompson, a movie producer accused of murder
- Sofia Pernas as Elizabeth Smith, the Los Angeles city prosecutor who had a history with Amanda that resulted in the death of a client
- Carson A. Egan as Eddie Black, Ted's older brother who was born with Down syndrome. He died before the series begins, but appears in flashbacks. According to show creator Aaron Korsh, appears as Ted's "subconscious" in the present day.
- Anthony Azizi as Pellegrini, a crime boss in New York that was sent to prison
- Matt Letscher as Edward Brooks, Ted's father
- Maury Sterling as David Bowie, a Hollywood fixer represented by Stuart's firm
- Victoria Justice as Dylan Pryor, a newly minted action star looking for fresh representation at the firm

=== Guest ===
- John Amos as himself
- Gabriel Macht as Harvey Specter, an old friend of Ted's who helped send Pellegrini to prison
- Brian Baumgartner as himself
- Patton Oswalt as himself
- Enrico Colantoni as himself
- David Costabile as Daniel Hardman
- Rich Sommer as Marvin Semple
- Yvette Nicole Brown as herself
- Rick Hoffman as Louis Litt
- Spencer Garrett as Bill
- Alexander Bertrand as Vinnie Santoro

== Episodes ==
No.	Title	Directed by	Written by	Original air date	U.S. viewers (millions)
1	"Seven Days a Week and Twice on Sunday"	Victoria Mahoney	Aaron Korsh	February 23, 2025	2.61
2	"Old Man Hanrahan"	Anton L. Cropper	Aaron Korsh	March 2, 2025	1.47
3	"He Knew"	Christopher Misiano	Genevieve Sparling	March 9, 2025	1.54
4	"Batman Returns"	Silver Tree	Jon Cowan	March 16, 2025	1.59
5	"You're on Your Own"	Anton L. Cropper	Sharyn Rothstein	March 23, 2025	1.29
6	"Dester"	Michael Smith	Rick Muirragui	March 30, 2025	1.40
7	"Good Times"	Cierra "Shooter" Glaudé	Marshall Knight & Rob LaMorgese	April 6, 2025	1.75
8	"Acapulco"	Anton L. Cropper	Sharyn Rothstein	April 13, 2025	1.40
9	"Bat Signal"	Silver Tree	Rick Muirragui	April 20, 2025	1.31
10	"Slugfest"	Erin Feeley	Maia Henkin	April 27, 2025	0.97
11	"Tearin' Up My Heart" "Stuart and the Tedster"	Erskine Forde	Jon Cowan	May 4, 2025	1.11
12	"Angry Sylvester"	Emile B. Levisetti	Genevieve Sparling	May 11, 2025	0.98
13	"Freedom"	Michael Smith	Aaron Korsh	May 18, 2025	1.00

== Production ==
=== Development ===
While working on the original Suits, Aaron Korsh came up with an idea for a show centered on Hollywood dealmakers anchored by a former prosecutor-turned-agent. The concept was loosely inspired by a real-life agent who once pursued Korsh as a client and had previously made a name for himself prosecuting mobsters. Initially, Korsh shelved the idea. But after Suits wrapped and the pandemic brought unexpected downtime, he decided to explore it further. At the time, the project was called Ted.

Korsh pitched the show to NBCUniversal twice and also brought it to Netflix. The first feedback he received was to reimagine the characters as lawyers. Much like with the original Suits, Korsh saw how that change could elevate the concept. He added a criminal law component to broaden the show’s foundation beyond just entertainment law.

On October 12, 2023, it was announced that an untitled Suits spin-off series is in development, with Aaron Korsh serving as the showrunner. On February 1, 2024, Suits LA was given a pilot order by NBC. The pilot is written by Korsh and directed by Victoria Mahoney. On December 28, 2023, it was reported that the spin-off would be set in Los Angeles. On July 19, 2024, Suits LA was picked to series by NBC. The series is created by Korsh who is expected to executive produce alongside David Bartis, Doug Liman, Gene Klein, and Mahoney. Production companies involved with the series are Hypnotic and Universal Content Productions. On August 7, 2024, it was reported that the character Ted Black was inspired by Ted Chervin, a CAA agent and former managing director of ICM Partners. On May 9, 2025, NBC canceled the series after one season.

=== Casting ===
In February 2024, Stephen Amell, Josh McDermitt and Lex Scott Davis were cast to star. In March 2024, Bryan Greenberg was cast as a series regular, with Troy Winbush and Alice Lee joining the cast as guest stars, but are set to be recurring if the pilot is picked to series. On April 18, 2024, John Amos, Victoria Justice, and Kevin Weisman were cast to guest star. Portraying himself, it would be Amos’ final role before his death a few months later, which writers incorporated into the show with the episode “Good Times” (named after the 1970s series in which Amos starred). In November 2024, it was announced that Gabriel Macht would reprise his role as Harvey Specter in a recurring capacity while Rachelle Goulding and Azita Ghanizada joined the cast in recurring roles. On December 10, 2024, Maggie Grace, Matt Letscher, Sofia Pernas, and Carson A. Egan were cast to guest star. On March 5, 2025, Rick Hoffman was cast to reprise his role as Louis Litt.

=== Filming ===
On August 1, 2024, it was reported that production for the series had been moved from Vancouver to Los Angeles. The pilot was filmed in Vancouver.

== Broadcast ==
Suits LA premiered on February 23, 2025, on NBC. In Canada, the series aired on CTV, and became available to stream on Crave a day after each episode aired.

== Reception ==
=== Critical response ===
The review aggregator website Rotten Tomatoes reported a 39% approval rating with an average rating of 5.2/10, based on 33 critic reviews. The website's critics consensus reads, "Larded with gloomy backstory, Suits LA dresses like the original article but lacks the acumen to make a case for itself." Metacritic, which uses a weighted average, assigned a score of 49 out of 100 based on 8 critics, indicating "mixed or average" reviews.

=== Ratings ===
Viewership and ratings per episode of Suits LA
No.	Title	Air date	Rating/share (18–49)	Viewers (millions)	DVR (18–49)	DVR viewers (millions)	Total (18–49)	Total viewers (millions)	Ref.
1	"Seven Days a Week and Twice on Sunday"	February 23, 2025	0.2/3	2.61	0.1	1.21	0.3	3.82	
2	"Old Man Hanrahan"	March 2, 2025	0.2/2	1.47	0.1	0.95	0.3	2.42	
3	"He Knew"	March 9, 2025	0.2/2	1.54	0.1	0.88	0.2	2.42	
4	"Batman Returns"	March 16, 2025	0.2/3	1.59	0.1	0.88	0.3	2.47	
5	"You're on Your Own"	March 23, 2025	0.2/2	1.29	0.1	0.83	0.3	2.12	
6	"Dester"	March 30, 2025	0.2/3	1.40	0.1	0.69	0.3	2.09	
7	"Good Times"	April 6, 2025	0.2/3	1.75	0.1	0.66	0.3	2.41	
8	"Acapulco"	April 13, 2025	0.2/2	1.40	0.1	0.65	0.2	2.05	
9	"Bat Signal"	April 20, 2025	0.1/2	1.31	0.0	0.65	0.2	2.00	
10	"Slugfest"	April 27, 2025	0.1/1	0.97	0.1	0.59	0.2	1.56	
11	"Tearin' Up My Heart"	May 4, 2025	0.1/2	1.11	0.1	0.62	0.2	1.73	
12	"Angry Sylvester"	May 11, 2025	0.1/2	0.98	—N/a	—N/a	—N/a	—N/a	
13	"Freedom"	May 18, 2025	0.1/1	1.00	—N/a	—N/a	—N/a	—N/a	
