= Suits (American TV series) =

American television series, 2011–2019

- Genre: Legal drama; Comedy-drama
- Created by: Aaron Korsh
- Starring: Gabriel Macht; Patrick J. Adams; Rick Hoffman; Meghan Markle; Sarah Rafferty; Gina Torres; Amanda Schull; Dulé Hill; Katherine Heigl
- Theme music composer: Ima Robot
- Opening theme: "Greenback Boogie" by Ima Robot
- Composer: Christopher Tyng
- Country of origin: United States
- Original language: English
- No. of seasons: 9
- No. of episodes: 134 (list of episodes)

Production
- Executive producers: Aaron Korsh; Doug Liman; Dave Bartis
- Producers: Gene Klein; Gabriel Macht; Patrick J. Adams; JM Danguilan
- Production locations: New York City, U.S.; Toronto, Canada
- Cinematography: Dan Stoloff
- Camera setup: Single-camera
- Running time: 42 minutes
- Production companies: Untitled Korsh Company; Hypnotic Films & Television; Universal Content Productions (Note: Credited as Universal Cable Productions for seasons 1–8.); Open 4 Business Productions

Original release
- Network: USA Network
- Release: June 23, 2011 – September 25, 2019

Related
- Pearson; Suits LA

Suits is an American legal drama television series created and written by Aaron Korsh. Produced by Universal Content Productions, it premiered on USA Network on June 23, 2011.

Set in a New York City corporate law firm, the series follows Mike Ross (Patrick J. Adams), a college dropout with a photographic memory, as he works as an associate for the successful and charismatic attorney Harvey Specter (Gabriel Macht). Suits focuses on Harvey and Mike winning lawsuits and closing cases, while at the same time hiding Mike's secret of never having attended law school. It also features Rick Hoffman as Louis Litt, a neurotic, manipulative and unscrupulous financial-law partner; Meghan Markle as the ambitious, talented paralegal Rachel Zane; Sarah Rafferty as Harvey's legal secretary and confidante Donna Paulsen; and Gina Torres as the firm's wise but Machiavellian managing partner, Jessica Pearson. Although the show surrounds itself around legal action in corporate law, it also has a balance with personal lives as well as several love interests throughout the series.

On January 30, 2018, the series was renewed for an eighth season, but Torres, Adams, and Markle left the show. Katherine Heigl joined the cast as Samantha Wheeler. Recurring characters Alex Williams (Dulé Hill) and Katrina Bennett (Amanda Schull) were promoted to series regulars. The show was renewed for a 10-episode ninth and final season on January 23, 2019, which premiered on July 17, 2019, with Adams returning for three episodes.

Suits was nominated for numerous awards, including individual attention for Torres and Adams. Besides two nominations recognizing her role as a supporting actress, Torres was awarded Outstanding Performance in a Television Series at the 2013 NHMC Impact Awards. Adams was nominated for Outstanding Performance by a Male Actor in a Drama Series at the 2012 Screen Actors Guild Awards. The show itself was nominated for two People's Choice Awards. Its success spawned a short-lived spin-off, Pearson, centered on Jessica Pearson's entry into Chicago politics, which premiered alongside the final season of Suits on July 17, 2019. Suits concluded on September 25, 2019, after nine seasons and 134 episodes. The show received an immense surge in popularity after it was added to Netflix and Peacock in 2023, prompting NBCUniversal to begin development on a new spin-off series, titled Suits LA starring Stephen Amell.

== Series overview ==
Season	Episodes	Originally released	
Season	Episodes	First released	Last released
1	12	June 23, 2011	September 8, 2011
2	16	June 14, 2012	February 21, 2013
3	16	July 16, 2013	April 10, 2014
4	16	June 11, 2014	March 4, 2015
5	16	June 24, 2015	March 2, 2016
6	16	July 13, 2016	March 1, 2017
7	16	July 12, 2017	April 25, 2018
8	16	July 18, 2018	February 27, 2019
9	10	July 17, 2019	September 25, 2019

=== Season 1 (2011) ===
Mike Ross, a university expellee with a photographic memory, makes money by taking the LSAT and the bar examination for others. He does this to pay for his grandmother's living expenses, as she was his primary caregiver after both his parents died in a car accident when he was 11. In the pilot, Mike agrees to deliver a briefcase of cannabis for his best friend Trevor, a drug dealer, for a large payout. Mike astutely avoids being arrested in a sting, only to stumble into a job interview with Harvey Specter, a supremely self-assured senior partner at the prestigious Pearson Hardman, a law firm specializing in corporate law and one that only hires Harvard graduates. Harvey is impressed by Mike's tenacity and knowledge of the law and hires him as an associate, despite Mike's not having a license to practice law. Together they try cases while maintaining Mike's secret from the rest of the firm, though Harvey's insightful legal secretary, Donna Paulsen, finds out almost immediately. Mike meets Rachel Zane, an ambitious paralegal he is immediately attracted to, while trying to impress managing partner Jessica Pearson and avoid the suspicions of junior partner Louis Litt.

=== Season 2 (2012–13) ===
Jessica learns Mike's secret, but other issues take precedence when the co-founding partner, Daniel Hardman, who left the firm in disgrace, returns in a power bid for control of the firm. Tensions rise as Jessica and Harvey find themselves opposed by Louis, who sides with Hardman after being promised a promotion to senior partner. Mike begins a romantic relationship with Rachel but wants to tell her the truth about his lack of qualifications. Harvey forbids him from doing this and so Mike breaks up with her. He pursues other women after his grandmother's sudden death. Harvey and Donna face accusations of burying evidence and must uncover the truth while keeping incriminating evidence from Hardman, who wants to use it to leverage a managing partner position. The increasing threat from Hardman forces Jessica into a merger with a major British international law firm called Darby International, that is owned and managed by internationally renowned London corporate lawyer Edward Darby. Ultimately, Mike reveals his secret to Rachel.

=== Season 3 (2013–14) ===
Darby's presence in the firm gives Harvey leverage to seek a position as a named partner. Meanwhile, the merger causes Louis to clash with his British counterpart from Darby International, Nigel Alexander Nesbitt. Darby International client, British oil tycoon Ava Hessington, draws Harvey into a lengthy trial against former District Attorney Cameron Dennis, his former mentor during his time as an assistant district attorney at the New York County District Attorney's Office, and the lawsuit turns into a murder charge. Realizing that his fraud cannot continue forever, Mike leaves the newly renamed Pearson Specter for a job as an investment banker at Sidwell Investment Group, a hedge fund and investment management firm founded and spearheaded by Jonathan Sidwell. The firm, as part of a plea agreement in the Hessington Oil trial, rebrand to Pearson Specter as Darby is tricked into forfeiting his licence to practice law in America.

=== Season 4 (2014–15) ===
Mike's new job puts him and Harvey on opposite sides of a takeover battle, causing U.S. Securities and Exchange Commission prosecutor Sean Cahill and the entire SEC to accuse them of collusion. To satisfy Harvey, Louis goes the distance with shady billionaire investor Charles Forstman through an illegal route. When Mike is fired, Louis goes to extreme lengths to persuade Mike to return to Pearson Specter rather than work for Forstman, as working for him might expose Louis's wrongdoing. To do that, Louis demands that Jessica rehire Mike Ross. Meanwhile Rachel and Mike go through a rough patch as Mike returns to the firm. Louis resigns to avoid being fired but when he realizes Mike never went to Harvard, he extorts Jessica into rehiring him with the promise of making him a named partner, as he has long wanted. Mike proposes to Rachel; Donna leaves Harvey to work for Louis.

=== Season 5 (2015–16) ===
Harvey struggles with losing Donna and begins to open up to his therapist Paula Agard about his broken relationship with his mother. Louis's insecurity and desire to undermine Harvey create an opening for Jack Soloff, an ambitious partner whom Hardman is manipulating. Rachel's wedding plans and her relationship with her parents are overshadowed by Mike's secret. Mike and Harvey both resign to protect their future and the firm's respectively, but Mike is abruptly arrested for fraud. More and more people involved realize the allegations are true, and facing tenacious federal prosecutor Anita Gibbs, Assistant US Attorney for the US Attorney's Office for the Southern District of New York, Mike accepts a plea bargain, pleads guilty, and turns himself in so that no one else will go to jail. Mike and Rachel decide to get married before he is imprisoned. At the wedding, Mike realizes that it isn't right and tells Rachel that he will not marry her now, but if she still wants him in two years, he will marry her after getting out of prison. Harvey escorts him to prison, saying their last few goodbyes. Jessica, Louis, and Donna return to the firm, but find every employee has left for another firm.

=== Season 6 (2016–17) ===
A two-year prison sentence puts Mike at the mercy of Frank Gallo, an inmate with a grudge against Harvey. At Pearson Specter Litt, few employees remain to help. Rachel works an Innocence Project case for her law professor at Columbia University; Jessica assists pro bono but is distracted from matters at the firm and chooses to leave to pursue her own life. Mike's cellmate Kevin Miller proves pivotal in a deal Harvey made with Sean Cahill, in which Mike turns on Kevin in order for Sean to get to his father-in-law, investment firm head William Sutter, for fraud in exchange for Mike's freedom, which he ultimately wins when he secretly catches a murder attempt by Frank on camera. He struggles with his fraud being public knowledge but obtains a job as legal consultant/supervisor at a legal clinic called Eastside Legal Clinic. Harvey helps both Rachel and Mike pass the bar and persuades Mike to return to the firm.

=== Season 7 (2017–18) ===
Everyone at the firm struggles to adjust to Jessica's absence. Donna takes a position as COO, and Harvey's friend Alex Williams joins the team. Harvey begins dating Paula; Louis' sessions with his own German therapist, Stan Lipschitz, have mixed results. Rachel begins her career as an attorney, having passed the bar. Mike continues to work pro bono cases at the clinic, with Harvey's blessing, but one of the cases puts Alex, Harvey, and others at risk. Louis and Sheila Sasz, Head of Admissions for Columbia University, reconnect, as does Jessica with her family in Chicago. Mike and Rachel accept an offer to found and run their own public interest law firm in Seattle that takes on class-action suits, and get married before leaving. As the season closes, a case that puts Specter Litt in danger is the work of top lawyer Robert Zane's partners, Ellen Rand and Eric Kaldor. When Zane finds out, he joins forces with Specter Litt.

=== Season 8 (2018–19) ===
After a brief conflict over who will become managing partner of the newly created firm, it is quickly resolved that Robert will (with Donna remaining COO), and the firm is renamed Zane Specter Litt. Robert hires a new senior partner, his right-hand and fixer Samantha Wheeler. After a season-long battle between Wheeler and Alex Williams over who will be added first as a name partner, both names are ultimately added to the wall. Louis learns that Sheila is pregnant. Former ADA and ex–Pearson Hardman senior associate Katrina Bennett makes senior partner and struggles with romantic feelings for her married personal associate. Donna and Harvey finally admit their feelings for one another, but Donna's mishandling of client/boyfriend Thomas Kessler forces Zane to sacrifice his legal career for the good of the firm, and he is disbarred.

=== Season 9 (2019) ===
With Robert now disbarred, Faye Richardson, a special master from the bar, is sent to take control and oversee the firm as acting managing partner due to the perception of the underhanded tactics it has used for years. Faye is out to dismantle and destroy the firm but has a few skeletons of her own that can be used to take her down. At the end of the season, Louis marries Sheila, Sheila gives birth to their baby, Harvey marries Donna, and they move to Seattle to be with Mike and Rachel. Louis makes Katrina a name partner and remains to lead the firm, now known as Litt Wheeler Williams Bennett.

== Cast and characters ==
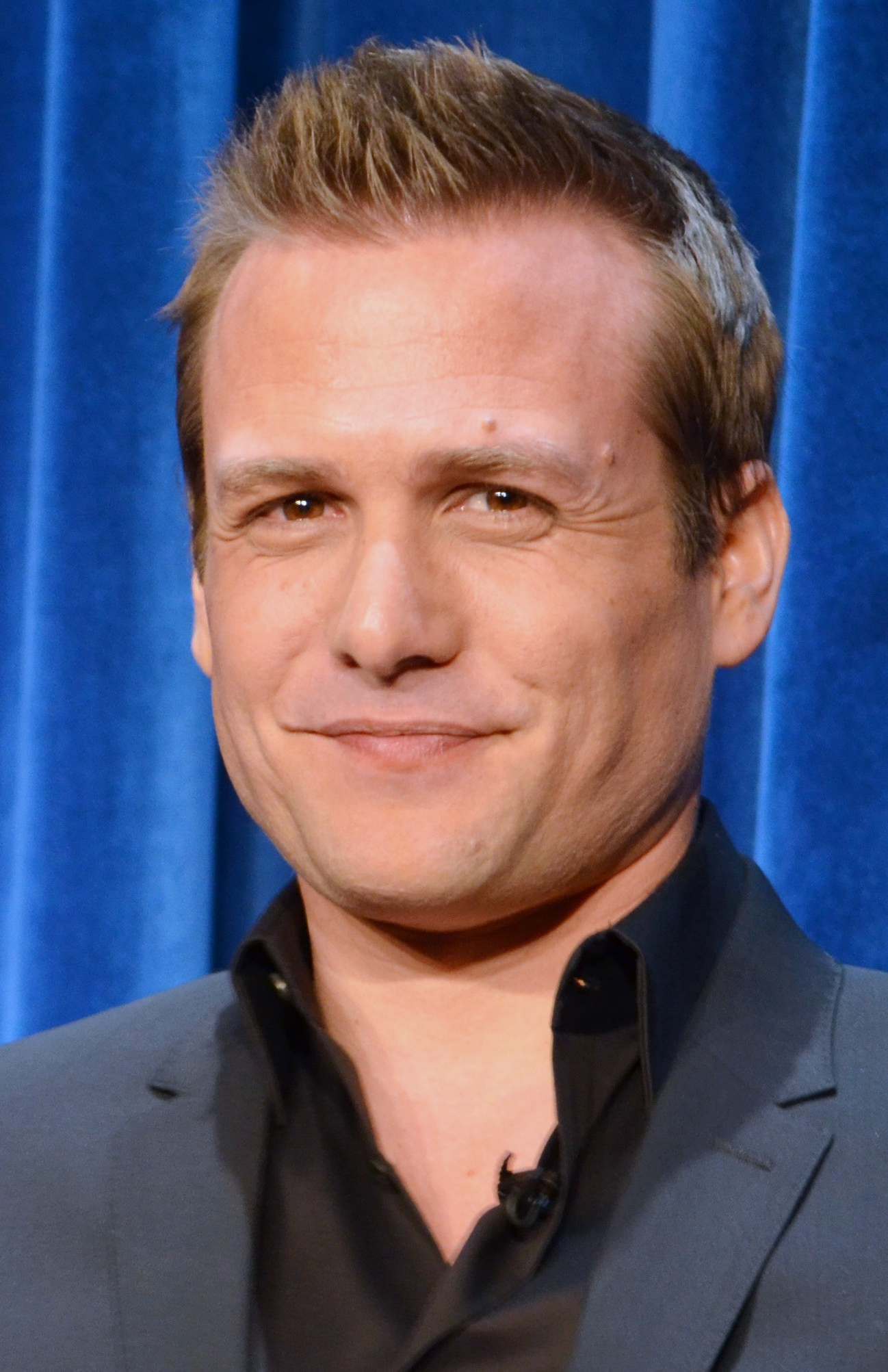
Gabriel Macht at a promotional event for Suits

- Gabriel Macht as Harvey Reginald Specter: The best closer in the city and Jessica Pearson's right-hand man. Harvey has been a name partner since the firm was named "Pearson Darby Specter" but resigns from "Specter Litt Wheeler Williams" in season 9. He marries Donna Paulsen in the series finale and moves to Seattle with Mike Ross and Rachel Zane.
- Patrick J. Adams as Michael James Ross (main seasons 1–7; recurring season 9): Mike is hired by Harvey Specter to be his associate, despite not having a license to practice law. In season 5, Mike gets caught, and, to protect Jessica Pearson, Harvey, and Louis Litt, he takes a deal to serve two years in prison. In season 6, Mike takes a deal to get out early and – in the season finale – passes the bar so that he can legally practice law. He marries Rachel Zane and moves to Seattle in the season 7 finale. He returns in season 9 to help Harvey, Louis, Alex, and Samantha oust Faye Richardson from the firm.
- Rick Hoffman as Louis Marlowe Litt: Initially a junior partner at Pearson Hardman, Louis’s self-serving and underhanded tactics often mask his deep passion for the law and the firm’s success. While admiring Harvey Specter, he struggles with jealousy over Harvey’s charisma and his close bond with Jessica Pearson. In season 4, Louis uses Mike Ross’s secret to strong-arm Jessica into naming him a partner, creating Pearson Specter Litt. As managing partner of "Litt Wheeler Williams Bennett," Louis evolves into a loyal and compassionate leader, treating the firm’s members like family. Married to Sheila Sazs, with whom he welcomes their daughter, Lucy Litt, in the series finale, Louis embraces both personal and professional growth. Known for mentoring associates with his tough yet effective style, Louis takes immense pride in shaping their careers. His transformation, highlighted by his iconic catchphrase, "You just got Litt up!" makes him one of the show’s most dynamic and beloved characters.
- Meghan Markle as Rachel Elizabeth Zane (main seasons 1–7): Rachel is the daughter of Robert Zane, one of the best lawyers in the city. Despite getting a job offer at his firm (Rand, Kaldor, Zane), Rachel goes to work as a senior paralegal at Pearson Hardman. She later becomes an associate at Pearson Specter Litt, the first who attended a law school other than Harvard. She marries Mike Ross and moves to Seattle in the season 7 finale.
- Sarah Rafferty as Donna Roberta Paulsen: Harvey Specter's former secretary and confidante. She goes to work for Louis Litt as his secretary in season 5 but later returns to Harvey. She is one of the only people alongside Louis, Harvey, Jessica Pearson, Rachel Zane, and Benjamin to stay at Pearson Specter Litt after Mike Ross is caught and sentenced to prison for two years for practicing law without a degree. In season 7, she becomes the COO of PSL. Due to Donna's mishandling of client/boyfriend Thomas Kessler in season 8, Daniel Hardman puts a case on Zane Specter Litt Wheeler Williams, which results in Robert Zane taking the fall for Donna's mistake and Zane getting disbarred. Harvey and Donna get together by Season 8's end and get married in the series finale.
- Gina Torres as Jessica Lourdes Pearson (main seasons 1–6; recurring season 7): Jessica Pearson co-founded Pearson Hardman with Daniel Hardman. In the season 1 finale, she finds out that Harvey's associate (Mike Ross) has been practicing law without a degree. Rather than fire him, Harvey persuades her to retain Mike and himself so they can be well-equipped against Daniel Hardman, the other founding partner who returned after a years-long absence. After a long-waged power struggle in season 2, Jessica removes Hardman's name off the wall and merges with Edward Darby, creating Pearson Darby. She then promotes Harvey to name partner in season 3 and removes Edward Darby's name off the wall, creating Pearson Specter. In season 4, Louis Litt leverages Mike Ross's fraud into becoming a name partner. In season 6, Mike is caught and sentenced to two years in prison; however, he is able to save Jessica, Louis, and Harvey from being put in prison. In mid-season 6, Jessica chooses to leave corporate law and move to Chicago with her lover, Jeff Malone. However, prosecutor Anita Gibbs's attack on Mike forces Jessica to return and proclaim that she knew about Mike's fraud in his hearing to become a lawyer – causing her to get disbarred. She appears in season 7 on various occasions.
- Amanda Schull as Katrina Amanda Bennett (recurring seasons 2–7; main seasons 8–9): A former fifth-year associate hired by Harvey and later Louis's associate; in the fallout when Louis almost leaves the firm, she goes to work for Robert Zane, Rachel's father, but returns to Specter Litt in season 6 and becomes a senior partner in season 8. By the end of the series, she is a named partner of Litt Wheeler Williams Bennett.
- Dulé Hill as Alex Williams (recurring season 7; main seasons 8–9): Harvey's old friend who was a partner at Bratton Gould; Harvey hires him as a senior partner at Specter Litt, and later becomes a named partner at Zane Specter Litt Wheeler Williams.
- Katherine Heigl as Samantha Wheeler (main seasons 8–9): A talented new partner at Zane Specter Litt, previously known as Robert Zane's "right-hand man," who challenges the status quo and later becomes a named partner at Zane Specter Litt Wheeler Williams, Specter Litt Wheeler Williams and finally Litt Wheeler Williams Bennett.

== Production ==
=== Development ===
Suits first appeared on USA Network's development slate under the title A Legal Mind in April 2010. On April 5, 2010, USA announced that it was developing seven new pilots for its 2010–2011 television season, including A Legal Mind, which became Suits. The premiere was written by Aaron Korsh, and David Bartis and Gene Klein served as executive producers.

Korsh, whose Notes from the Underbelly sitcom was canceled during the 2007–2008 writers' strike, wrote a spec script intended to be a "half-hour Entourage-type based on my experiences working on Wall Street." He later realized that the project should have hour long episodes. Korsh and his agent took the script to several production companies and wanted to give the script to Universal Media Studios. But Korsh found it odd that the studio did not want to sell the script to NBC, the network it typically worked with. His agent convinced USA Network executive Alex Sepiol that although the series was neither a procedural nor what the network typically did, he would like the characters. Sepiol approved the script, and by then, Hypnotic Films & Television signed on to the project. The team pitched the script to USA, which bought the script after the pitch. Korsh did not pitch it to anyone else. When rewriting the script, Korsh made only small changes to the first half-hour, up to when Mike is hired. Originally, Mike did not take LSATs for others and only pretended to have attended Harvard instead of pretending he attended Harvard and has a law degree. Korsh noted that no degree or test is needed to work on Wall Street and be a mathematical genius, unlike the bar examination in law. He decided to "embrace" this difference and change the premise.

The pilot was filmed in New York City, where the series is set, at Kirkland & Ellis LLP. The rest of the series was filmed in Toronto (at Downsview Park Studios), where the sets are built to be identical to the New York law offices seen in the pilot. To promote the series debut, USA had an advance screening of the pilot on June 2, 2011, at Hudson River Park, and distributed free Häagen-Dazs Sundae cones at the viewing. The network also had a branded ice-cream carts, bikes, and scooters giveaway at the Sundaes and USA/Entertainment Weekly 2011 promotion summer guides on June 22 and 23. It also held the promotion in New York City, Los Angeles, Chicago, San Francisco, and Boston to endorse the pilot.

=== Casting and marketing ===
The season was created by Aaron Korsh and aired on the USA Network in the United States. The season was produced by Hypnotic Films & Television and Universal Cable Productions. The executive producers were Korsh, Doug Liman, and David Bartis. The staff writers were: Korsh with three writing credits; Sean Jablonski, Jon Cowan, Ethan Drogin, and Rick Muirragui with two each; and Erica Lipez with one. The season's directors were Kevin Bray, John Scott, Dennie Gordon, Kate Woods, Terry McDonough, Tim Matheson, Norberto Barba, Felix Alcala, Jennifer Getzinger, and Mike Smith. In July 2010, the first actor was cast: Patrick J. Adams as Mike Ross. In late July, Gabriel Macht joined the cast as Harvey Specter. Rick Hoffman came on board in mid-August to portray Harvey's competition, Louis, at the law firm. Meghan Markle soon joined the cast in late August, who was set to play Rachel Zane. Jessica Pearson was created to be played as a male but was given to Gina Torres. Sarah Rafferty completed the main cast as Donna, and the pilot was filmed in New York City in the fall of 2010.

The series was soon commissioned with a 12-episode order on January 19, 2011. The series began filming in Toronto on April 25, 2011, and completed on August 12 in New York City. Post-production was done at Cherry Beach Sound. "Greenback Boogie" by Ima Robot is the show's theme song, was released as a single on September 18, 2010, and is on the band's third album, Another Man's Treasure.

A deleted scene leaked onto YouTube shows Victor Garber as Phillip Hardman. It was originally part of the pilot, but was cut during script rewrites. It shows that Hardman retired from the firm of his own accord. Despite being cut for American audiences, the scene was left in for British viewers when it was first aired, and continues to be included in reruns.

== Broadcast and home media ==
The first season premiered on June 23, 2011, and concluded on September 8, 2011. The season ran for 12 episodes, including a 90-minute pilot. The complete first season was available on Region 1 DVD on May 1, 2012, and Region A/B Blu-ray on April 10, 2014.

Suits was renewed for a second season consisting of 16 episodes on August 11, 2011, which premiered on June 14, 2012. The mid-season finale aired on August 23, 2012, with the remaining six episodes returning on January 17, 2013. The complete second season was available on Region 1 DVD on December 2, 2013, and Region A/B Blu-ray on June 26, 2014. On October 12, 2012, the show was renewed for a third season of 16 episodes. Season 3 premiered on July 16, 2013, with the final six episodes airing after March 6, 2014. The complete third season was available on December 22, 2014, on Region 1 DVD and was released on Region A/B Blu-ray on September 1, 2014. A fourth season of 16 episodes was announced on October 24, 2013. Season 4 premiered on June 11, 2014, with the mid-season finale on August 6, 2014. The complete fourth season was available on June 8, 2015, on Region 1 DVD and was released on Region A/B Blu-ray on June 8, 2015. On August 11, 2014, USA Network announced a fifth season of 16 episodes, which premiered on June 24, 2015. The complete fifth season was available on May 31, 2016, Region 1 DVD and was released on Region A/B Blu-ray on June 6, 2016. The complete sixth season was available on Region 1 DVD on May 30, 2017, and was released on Region A/B Blu-ray on May 29, 2017.

On July 1, 2015, Suits was renewed for a sixth season consisting of 16 episodes and premiered on July 13, 2016. The series is available through streaming services on Amazon Video, iTunes, Vudu, and Xfinity. In the United Kingdom and Ireland, the first six seasons of Suits were broadcast on Dave, but the channel chose to drop the series before Season 7, causing Netflix to pick up the UK rights, streaming the programme less than 24 hours after its U.S. broadcast. Netflix did not pick up the rights for Ireland. The series has not been released on Blu-ray in the United States or in Canada, but Region A/B releases are readily available in the United Kingdom, Germany, Italy and Spain.

The series became available on Netflix and Peacock in mid-2023, where it experienced an unprecedented surge in popularity, topping Nielsen ratings charts for a record 12 weeks and becoming Netflix's "most-watched acquired series in a single week". Nielsen announced that Suits was watched for a total of 57.7 billion minutes on Netflix in 2023, making it the most-streamed show of the year.

In its coverage of the series’ renewed streaming momentum, The Hollywood Reporter cited viewership estimates sourced from research firm PlumResearch indicating that Suits was among the most-watched licensed series across major platforms during the summer of 2023.

Additional detailed metrics for the series’ catalog performance were reported by Media Play News based on PlumResearch data. For the U.S. weekly period of June 26 to July 2, 2023, PlumResearch recorded 6.1 million unique viewers for season one of Suits on Netflix, with viewers generating 21.4 million hours watched. Season two was also tracked within the same interval, drawing 2.9 million unique viewers and 17.2 million hours watched.

As a result of the renewed interest in the series, a spin-off was put in development by October, led by Korsh. The original series made its American broadcast TV debut on MyNetworkTV as strip programming in fall 2024, airing Tuesdays at 8:00 & 9:00 p.m. EST until it was removed in fall 2025. It also aired reruns on Start TV from May 4 to September 21, 2025.

== Reception ==
=== Critical reception ===
Critical response of Suits
Season	Rotten Tomatoes	Metacritic
1	78% (23 reviews)	61 (17 reviews)
2	86% (14 reviews)	75 (4 reviews)
3	85% (13 reviews)	71 (4 reviews)
4	100% (10 reviews)	—N/a
5	100% (12 reviews)	—N/a
6	100% (11 reviews)	—N/a
7	94% (16 reviews)	—N/a
8	100% (13 reviews)	—N/a
9	83% (6 reviews)	—N/a

On Metacritic, the show has a weighted average score of 65 out of 100, based on reviews from 29 critics, indicating "generally favorable reviews". On Rotten Tomatoes, the series holds a 91% approval rating with the Season 3 consensus reading, "Though it's occasionally overly wordy, Suits stimulates with drama derived from the strength of its well-developed characters' relationships." Carrie Raisler of The A.V. Club wrote, "Suits has more internal forward momentum than most anything else on television right now, and when it's on, like it mostly is here, it just cooks." Julie Hinds of The Detroit Free Press said, "The combination of Gabriel Macht as slick attorney Harvey Specter and Patrick J. Adams as unlicensed legal genius Mike Ross has been a winning one."

=== Ratings ===
Viewership and ratings per season of Suits
Season	Timeslot (ET)	Episodes	First aired		Last aired		TV season	Avg. viewers (millions)	Avg. 18–49 rating
Season	Timeslot (ET)	Episodes	Date	Viewers (millions)	Date	Viewers (millions)	TV season	Avg. viewers (millions)	Avg. 18–49 rating
1	Thursday 10:00 pm	12	June 23, 2011	4.64	September 8, 2011	3.47	2011-12	4.28	1.4
2	Thursday 10:00 pm	16	June 14, 2012	3.47	February 21, 2013	3.20	2012-13	3.60	1.2
3	Tuesday 10:00 pm (1–10); Thursday 9:00 pm (11–16)	16	July 16, 2013	2.93	April 10, 2014	2.40	2013-14	2.73	0.9
4	Wednesday 9:00 pm	16	June 11, 2014	2.50	March 4, 2015	1.55	2014-15	2.26	0.7
5	Wednesday 9:00 pm (1–10); Wednesday 10:00 pm (11–16)	16	June 24, 2015	2.13	March 2, 2016	1.71	2015-16	2.01	0.6
6	Wednesday 9:00 pm (1–10); Wednesday 10:00 pm (11–16)	16	July 13, 2016	1.85	March 1, 2017	1.13	2016-17	1.60	0.4
7	Wednesday 9:00 pm	16	July 12, 2017	1.40	April 25, 2018	1.07	2017-18	1.30	0.3
8	Wednesday 9:00 pm (1–10); Wednesday 10:00 pm (11–16)	16	July 18, 2018	1.27	February 27, 2019	0.74	2018-19	1.02	0.2
9	Wednesday 9:00 pm	10	July 17, 2019	1.04	September 25, 2019	0.86	2019-20	0.99	0.2

=== Awards and nominations ===
Year	Award	Category	Recipient(s)	Result	Ref.
2012	SAG Award	Outstanding Performance by a Male Actor in a Drama Series	Patrick J. Adams	Nominated	
2012	ALMA Award	Favorite TV Actress - Supporting Role	Gina Torres	Nominated	
2013	Imagen Foundation Awards	Best Supporting Actress/Television	Gina Torres	Nominated	
2013	NHMC Impact Awards	Outstanding Performance In A Television Series	Gina Torres	Won	
2014	TV Guide Award	Favorite Drama Series	Suits	Nominated	
2015	People's Choice Awards	Favorite Dramedy	Suits	Nominated	
2015	NAACP Image Award	Outstanding Directing in a Drama Series	Anton Cropper (for "One-Two-Three Go...")	Nominated	
2016	People's Choice Awards	Fantastic Cable TV Drama	Suits	Nominated	
2018	Imagen Foundation Awards	Best Supporting Actress/Television	Gina Torres	Won	

== Spin-offs ==
=== Pearson ===
In February 2017, USA began early talks for a potential Jessica Pearson spin-off. Gina Torres would star in and produce the spin-off. In August 2017, it was revealed that the season 7 finale of Suits would serve as a backdoor pilot to the potential Jessica Pearson spin-off series. On March 8, 2018, it was announced the Jessica Pearson spin-off was picked up to series. On January 17, 2019, it was announced the spin-off would be called Pearson, titled after the main star's character. On May 1, 2019, it was announced that the series would premiere on July 17, 2019. In October 2019, the series was canceled after one season.

=== Suits LA ===
In October 2023, it was announced that Universal Television and NBCUniversal were developing an untitled Suits spin-off series, with Aaron Korsh as showrunner. In December 2023, the series was revealed to be set in Los Angeles, and a pilot for the series, titled Suits LA, was ordered in February 2024. In July 2024, the project was ordered to series. The show stars Stephen Amell as Ted Black, a former federal prosecutor from New York who reinvents himself as a high-profile entertainment lawyer in Los Angeles. Macht is slated to have a recurring role in the series, reprising the character of Harvey Specter. Suits LA premiered on NBC on February 23, 2025. In May 2025, the series was canceled after one season.

== Remakes ==
Jang Dong-gun and Park Hyung-sik star in a Korean remake of the series, which is produced by Monster Union and EnterMedia Pictures and was broadcast on KBS2 in 2018.

Yūji Oda and Yuto Nakajima play leading roles in a Japanese remake broadcast by Fuji Television in 2018.

Asser Yassin and Ahmed Dawood play leading roles in an Egyptian remake on OSN and Egyptian streaming site WatchIt, the show aired in 2022 through Ramadan, which is when most shows air due to the observance of higher viewership count during the islamic month.

Samdanpurev Oyunsambuu and Chinzorig Erdenebayar play leading roles in a Mongolian remake broadcast by Mongol TV in 2023.
