= Harvey Specter =

Fictional character in television series Suits

- Suits character
- Gabriel Macht as Harvey Specter
- First appearance: "Pilot" (2011)
- Last appearance: "Bat Signal" (2025)
- Created by: Aaron Korsh
- Portrayed by: Gabriel Macht

In-universe information
- Full name: Harvey Reginald Specter
- Occupation: Corporate lawyer
- Significant other: Donna Paulsen (wife)
- Nationality: American
- Positions: Managing partner at Pearson Specter
- Location: Manhattan, New York, U.S.
- Alma mater: New York University (Note: Undergraduate degree); Harvard Law School

Harvey Reginald Specter J.D. is a fictional character and one of the two main protagonists from the USA Network legal drama television series Suits. Introduced as one of New York City's top corporate lawyers and a senior partner at the prestigious law firm Pearson Hardman, the character was created by Aaron Korsh and portrayed by Gabriel Macht.

Harvey is known for sharp wit, strategic thinking, and reputation as a "closer". He becomes one of the central figures of the series and a mentorship to Mike Ross (Patrick J. Adams). Macht later reprised the role in the 2025 spinoff series Suits LA, wrapping up a three-episode arc that was shot. According to Macht, he thought his time with the character was finished after the original series ended.

== Development ==
=== Creation ===
Harvey Specter was created by television writer and producer Aaron Korsh. In the early stages of development, the character was initially conceived as an older figure who would act as a father-like mentor to Mike, with early ideas suggesting Harvey would be around 50 years old, creating more of a father and son dynamic between them.

Korsh later reworked the idea and made Harvey younger, placing him in his thirties so the character could grow alongside Mike and keep a more competitive relationship with him. He originally planned the show as a half-hour comedy about Wall Street investment bankers, inspired by his own career. During development, the concept changed significantly, and it was later reworked into the legal drama that became the series.

=== Portrayal ===
Harvey is portrayed by Gabriel Macht, who played the character throughout the ninth season run of Suits. After the series ended in 2019, Macht took several years away from acting before returning in the spinoff Suits LA. Macht said that stepping back into the role felt nostalgic, especially during scenes that reflected parts of Harvey's earlier storylines. The spinoff also shows Harvey's past work as a prosecutor and his professional relationship with Ted Black.

== Character overview ==
Harvey Specter is introduced as one of New York's top legal closers, a lawyer known for resolving tough cases through negotiation, courtroom strategy, or careful planning. From the start, he is portrayed as confident, controlled, and rarely defeated, often handling the firm's most challenging disputes.

In the pilot episode, Harvey hires Mike, a young man with a photographic memory who never attended law school but makes a strong impression on Harvey during their first meeting. Harvey rises through Pearson Specter to become managing partner, but he faces betrayals and important case losses that challenge his role as the firm's top closer.

He later appears in the 2025 spinoff Suits LA, where flashbacks show his early career and his friendship with federal prosecutor Ted Black. He also helps Ted with a case involving mobster John Pellegrini.

== Role in Suits ==
=== Season 1 and 2 ===
Harvey becomes a senior partner at the firm, but he must hire a Harvard Law graduate. He picks Mike, a brilliant young man with a troubled past who wants to make his mark in law. Harvey soon discovers that Mike has never actually gone to law school or college, even though he knows the law inside out. Harvey hires him and keeps his secret, taking Mike under his wing. They work on difficult cases together, and Mike often uses what he knows along with Harvey's reputation to help people who need it.

Harvey has to deal with a problem when his boss and friend Jessica Pearson (Gina Torres), learns Mike's secret. Meanwhile, Daniel Hardman (David Costabile), shows up at the firm again, and Harvey has no faith in him. Hardman's return causes tension, but Harvey focuses on protecting Jessica and keeping the firm steady. He works closely with her while continuing to handle cases and defend the firm's interests. Harvey uses his skill to protect the firm and deal with people who try to threaten it.

=== Season 3 and 4 ===
Harvey continues as a senior partner at the merged Pearson Darby and is soon given a high-profile client, Ava Hessington (Michelle Fairley). He works with Jessica to protect her, even as Louis Litt (Rick Hoffman) tries to take Mike away, claiming Harvey has nothing left to teach him. When Ava is accused of murder, Harvey fights to keep her out of prison and uncovers that Stephen Huntley (Max Beesley), Darby's fixer, gave the orders without Edward Darby's (Conleth Hill) knowledge. Harvey and Jessica work out a settlement that puts Huntley on the hook and removes Edward from the firm.

Ava later sues Pearson Darby for malpractice, and during depositions, Harvey, with Mike and Donna Paulsen (Sarah Rafferty), exposes Huntley's lies. Harvey stays firm with Ava but apologizes when needed. At the same time, Jessica finds out Mike and Rachel are dating and makes Mike get Rachel to sign an affidavit about her role in covering up his fake Harvard degree. Rachel agrees, but only after setting her own terms and deciding to go to Columbia University.

Harvey stays on as senior partner at Pearson Darby, handling big cases and keeping the firm safe. He clashes with Mike, who comes to him with a plan to buy Gillis Industries. Harvey refuses to go along at first and eventually has to drop Mike as a client to avoid a conflict. Logan Sanders (Brendan Hines) tries to force Harvey to go against Mike, but Harvey refuses to compromise Mike's reputation while handling the firm's cases. He faces SEC investigations and whistleblower issues head-on, making sure the firm stays protected.

=== Season 5 and 6 ===
After Donna leaves, Harvey struggles to adjust at work and in his personal life. He sees Dr. Paula Agard (Christina Cole) to deal with his panic attacks and the stress at work. When Jack Soloff (John Pyper-Ferguson) and Daniel create trouble at the firm, Harvey works to protect his colleagues and keep Mike and Rachel's secret. He helps Louis with both his personal and work problems and keeps an eye on Donna when she finds herself in dangerous situations. Harvey helps Mike stay out of legal trouble and guides him through his arrest and what happens after his fraud is exposed.

Harvey handles the firm's cases and keeps his friends safe. He handles a $100 million lawsuit, tough clients, and keeps Louis from getting into trouble. He also looks out for Donna when she is at risk and works to get Mike released early, outsmarting people like Frank Gallo (Paul Schulze). Harvey negotiates high-stakes deals, protects the firm's future, and guides Mike as he returns to law. He helps Rachel with her bar exam, assists Louis with personal matters, including his relationship with Tara, and keeps the firm running as interim managing partner while preparing for a future without Jessica.

=== Season 7 and 8 ===
Harvey runs Pearson Specter Litt after Jessica leaves. He deals with tough cases and protects the firm from trouble. Harvey dates Paula while handling work at the same time. He backs Donna's promotion, handles issues with Alex Williams, and keeps Louis focused on running the firm. He helps Jessica in Chicago when needed, handles big changes at the firm, and goes to Mike and Rachel's wedding.

Harvey is at Zane Specter Litt Wheeler Williams with Robert, Alex, and Samantha. He takes care of Mike's old clients, helps Max Loudan (Jon Fletcher) find the missing money, and fixes Anna Reed's (Angela E. Gibbs) overtime problem. He goes to Boston to help his brother Marcus with his kids. Harvey talks to a therapist to deal with his worries about losing friends, especially Louis. Harvey works with Donna to fix problems at the firm and handles clients like Thomas Bratton (Al Sapienza) and Andrew Malik (Usman Ally). Harvey has disagreements about running the firm and makes hard choices, but he keeps the firm steady. He sees that Donna is the one he wants to be with and goes to her apartment.

=== Season 9 ===
After getting together, Harvey and Donna spend the night at her apartment. They tell Mike and Rachel about their relationship and deal with Louis, who comes by with firm news. Harvey works to secure Robert's clients with Samantha, dealing with challenges from Eric Kaldor (Jeffrey Nordling) and Ellen Rand. He deals with problems with Samantha over clients, keeps the firm running, and balances his relationship with Donna.

Harvey deals with Faye Richardson (Denise Crosby), the firm's Special Master, who threatens the partners. He works with Louis, Donna, Samantha, and Alex to keep the firm and protect Donna's vote. Harvey makes up with Donna's father, showing respect for her family. He helps clients and defends the firm while staying loyal to Donna. Together with the partners, Harvey outsmarts Faye. He proposes to Donna at Louis and Sheila's wedding, and they marry. Harvey decides to work in Seattle with Mike and Rachel, focusing on helping the right people while leaving New York behind.

== Characterization ==
=== Personality and style ===
Harvey is depicted as confident, highly competitive, skilled at negotiation, and known as "the best closer in New York" is a defining part of his character. He often shares thoughts on success, responsibility, and self-confidence, which became memorable to viewers. Harvey is also known for his refined lifestyle and careful attention to fashion. His tailored suits and polished appearance give him a strong presence in the courtroom and at work. His expensive apartment, luxury memberships, and high-end wardrobe reflect the wealth of a successful corporate lawyer.

=== Relationships ===
Harvey's relationship with Mike is a major part of the series. He hires Mike even though he never went to law school, impressed by his intelligence and memory. Harvey's relationship with his secretary Donna, is one of the most significant in his life. They begin as colleagues, and over time their friendship turns into love. By the final season, they are married. Harvey also has complicated ties with other colleagues. Jessica helped him at the start of his career, while Louis is both a rival and a friend, causing conflict but also moments of humor.

In Suits LA, the series further explores Harvey's earlier friendship with prosecutor Ted and their shared history working against organized crime. Additional flashbacks and storylines reveal developments in Harvey's personal life, including the death of his brother Marcus.

== Reception ==
Harvey Specter became one of the most recognizable characters in Suits and received attention from critics and audiences. Dyah Ayu Larasati of Collider described Harvey as one of New York's top lawyers in the series, pointing to his sharp negotiating style and his memorable lines. Tai Gooden of Nerdist wrote that Harvey's appearance in Suits LA added more background to the character and explored parts of his life before the events of the original show.

Jean Bentley of Rotten Tomatoes noted that the character gained more emotional depth when the story focused less on legal work and more on Harvey's personal struggles. Mandi Bierly of Entertainment Weekly described Harvey as one of television's best-dressed lawyers and pointed to the confident style he shows throughout the series. Max Williams of Square Mile wrote that Harvey's confidence and many quoted lines helped make him popular with viewers.

The character also had influence outside the show. Harvey's portrayal sparked interest in legal careers and was even referenced in branding and marketing within the legal technology industry.
