= Dave Bartis =

American producer

David Bartis (born in Providence, Rhode Island) is an American film and television producer best known for producing Suits, The O.C., and Edge of Tomorrow.

Additionally, he is known for producing Covert Affairs, the Netflix spy-adventure series The Recruit, and Fair Game, a biographical political drama based on Valerie Plame's memoir of the same name starring Sean Penn and Naomi Watts.

Most of his career has been associated with the production company Hypnotic. He is co-owner with Doug Liman, whom he met as an undergraduate at Brown University.

== Early life ==
He is a graduate of McLean High School, located in McLean, Virginia. Bartis earned a Bachelor of Arts degree in English and American Literature from Brown University. He was an intern at Fox Lorber Associates in 1985.

While at Brown, Bartis co-founded its student cable television station with Doug Liman. With the help of a major grant through Liman's father's connections from the now-defunct CBS Foundation, Dave also co-founded the National Association of College Broadcasters (NACB), the first trade association geared to student-staffed radio and television stations, in 1988. He stayed on to run NACB for a short time after graduation in order to ensure the organization's transition to staff and student volunteers beyond the founders. Thanks to his subsequent professional connections (see Producer section below), Bartis secured Quincy Jones as the keynote speaker for NACB's third annual national conference in November 1990.

== Producing career ==
Bartis was Director of Programming at Quincy Jones Entertainment, involved in launching The Fresh Prince of Bel Air. He then became Vice President of Creative Affairs at HBO Independent Productions, and then Vice President of Original Programming. In 1993 Bartis joined NBC Studios and in 1997 he was appointed Senior Vice President of Primetime Series, where he oversaw series including Providence and Will & Grace. In 2001 he formed a film and television production company Hypnotic/Dutch Oven, with fellow producer Doug Liman whom he had met at university, which has frequently partnered with NBC (see Universal Content Productions) and HBO. As part of that company, Bartis served as executive producer on the television series Heist, The O.C., Suits, Knight Rider, Covert Affairs and Impulse, among others. In 2003 he produced the series of commercials and short films for Reebok, Terry Tate: Office Linebacker. He was executive producer on the films Knight Rider, Fair Game and Edge of Tomorrow, among others.

In a January 2011 post on his blog, Doug Liman summarized Dave's long-standing business relationship and friendship.
