= Jon Cowan =

American television producer and writer

- Born: United States
- Occupations: Producer, writer

Jon Cowan is an American television producer, and writer best known for his work on television shows Suits, Crossing Jordan and Private Practice.

Cowan joined the Private Practice writing staff in the second season. He is credited as the writer or co-writer of the following Private Practice episodes:

- "Tempting Faith" (2008)
- "Nothing to Fear" (2009)
- "Ex-Life" (2009)
- "Yours, Mine & Ours" (2009)
- "A Death in the Family" (2009)
- "Shotgun" (2010)
