= Legal secretary =

Category of worker within the legal profession

A legal secretary is a particular category of worker within the legal profession who assists lawyers, files documents, and sometimes performs other managerial duties.

== Background ==
In the practice of law in the United States, a legal secretary is a person who works in the legal profession, typically assisting lawyers. Legal secretaries help by preparing and filing legal documents, such as appeals or motions. It is not unusual for a larger firm to place managerial duties on a particular legal secretary. Much like a paralegal, a legal secretary is responsible for locating relevant information for cases. This type of person would be called a "paralegal" in the UK.

In the United Kingdom and the Commonwealth, a legal secretary is a secretary experienced in working for a law firm or in-house legal department. They assist by giving administrative support to lawyers and are significant members of a team of professionals who work together. The work of a legal secretary varies. They deal with a wide range of challenging legal and business issues, combining their skills with modern technology.

In Ceylon, it used to refer to the head of islands legal arms such as the Attorney General's Office and the Legal Draftsman's office during the British colonial period.

== Educational background ==
There is no specific educational requirement in most U.S. states for legal secretaries. However, unlike an administrative assistant, a legal secretary must be familiar with legal procedures. Many colleges and universities offer programs geared towards this career, however, there is not a degree associated with that of a legal secretary. Rather, students are enrolled in existing legal courses, which have been established for those who wish to pursue a career in law, such as a lawyer or police officer.

In the UK, they provide secretarial and clerical support to solicitors, barristers and the law courts. Their primary responsibilities are to deal with correspondence and preparation of legal documents such as wills, divorce petitions and witness statements. A legal secretary should have excellent secretarial skills together with a knowledge of law and legal procedures. They must be computer literate and have a good standard of English. People can acquire the legal skills they need through training companies, local colleges or some law firms are willing to train people themselves.

== See also ==
- Cabinet secretary or Department secretary
