= Corporate lawyer =

Lawyer specializing in corporate law

A corporate lawyer or corporate counsel is a type of lawyer who specializes in corporate law. Corporate lawyers working inside and for corporations are called in-house counsels or in-house lawyers.

== Roles and responsibilities ==
The role of a corporate lawyer is to ensure the legality of commercial transactions, advising corporations on their legal rights and duties, including the duties and responsibilities of corporate officers. In order to do this, they must have knowledge of aspects of contract law, tax law, accounting, securities law, bankruptcy, intellectual property rights, licensing, zoning laws, and the laws specific to the business of the corporations that they work for. Controversies involving well-known companies such as Walmart and General Motors have highlighted the complex role of corporate lawyers in internal investigations, in which attorney–client privilege could be considered to shelter potential wrongdoing by the company. If a corporate lawyer's internal company clients are not assured of confidentiality, they will be less likely to seek legal advice, but keeping confidences can shelter society's access to vital information.

The practice of corporate law is less adversarial than that of trial law. Lawyers for both sides of a commercial transaction are less opponents than facilitators. One lawyer (quoted by Bernstein) characterizes them as "the handmaidens of the deal". Transactions take place amongst peers. There are rarely wronged parties, underdogs, or inequities in the financial means of the participants. Corporate lawyers structure those transactions, draft documents, review agreements, negotiate deals, and attend meetings.

The areas of corporate law a corporate lawyer experiences depend from the geographic location of the lawyer's law firm and the number of lawyers in the firm. A small-town corporate lawyer in a small firm may deal in many short-term jobs such as drafting wills, divorce settlements, and real estate transactions, whereas a corporate lawyer in a large city firm may spend many months devoted to negotiating a single business transaction. Similarly, different firms may organize their subdivisions in different ways. Not all will include mergers and acquisitions under the umbrella of a corporate law division, for example.

Some corporate lawyers become partners in their firms. Others become in-house counsel for corporations. Others migrate to other professions such as investment banking and teaching law.

Some publications read by those in the profession include Global Legal Studies, Lawyers Weekly, and the National Law Journal.

== Salary ==
The salary of a corporate lawyer can vary widely. In BigLaw firms, median salaries for associates range from $200,000 to $330,000. This range varies based on years worked as an associate, calculated up to the eighth year: first-year associates make a median of $200,000, while eighth-year associates make a median of $330,000. Depending on the geographical location, the starting salary may be closer to US$160,000 per year if the market is secondary. Attorneys employed at smaller firms tend to earn smaller salaries. Solo practitioners, for instance, make an average of $65,000.

In BigLaw firms, median salaries for associates range from $200,000 to $330,000. This range varies based on years worked as an associate, calculated up to the eighth year: first-year associates make a median of $200,000, while eighth-year associates make a median of $330,000. Compensation for lawyers in BigLaw firms is typically organized in an hourly rate structure, where lawyers charge per hour on a billable time structure. Hourly rates vary greatly depending on the lawyer, whether they are a partner or an associate, with other factors taken into consideration. As of 2024, the highest lawyers have a rate of $2,100 to $2,620 per hour, with other partners charging $1,285 to $1,860. Many lawyers in these firms charge in the $800-900 range as well. Researchers created a top 32 list of firms that charge the most, the former figures being most prominent in these firms. As of early 2026, BigLaw lawyer fees have been surging, with one top US firm charging $4,000 per hour for its top partners.

== Perceptions ==
Corporate lawyers, especially in the context of securities law, are viewed as "gatekeepers", a view originating from their practice of vouching for a given security and staking their reputation on it to clients. Gatekeeper reliability is an integral component of the integrity of the securities markets. However, corporate securities attorneys have been criticized for their lack of accountability in upholding ethical standards, sometimes perpetrating misdeeds upon investors and other affected parties without adequate redress.

== See also ==
- Corporate law
- Enterprise legal management
- General counsel
