= Rick Hoffman =

American actor (born 1970)

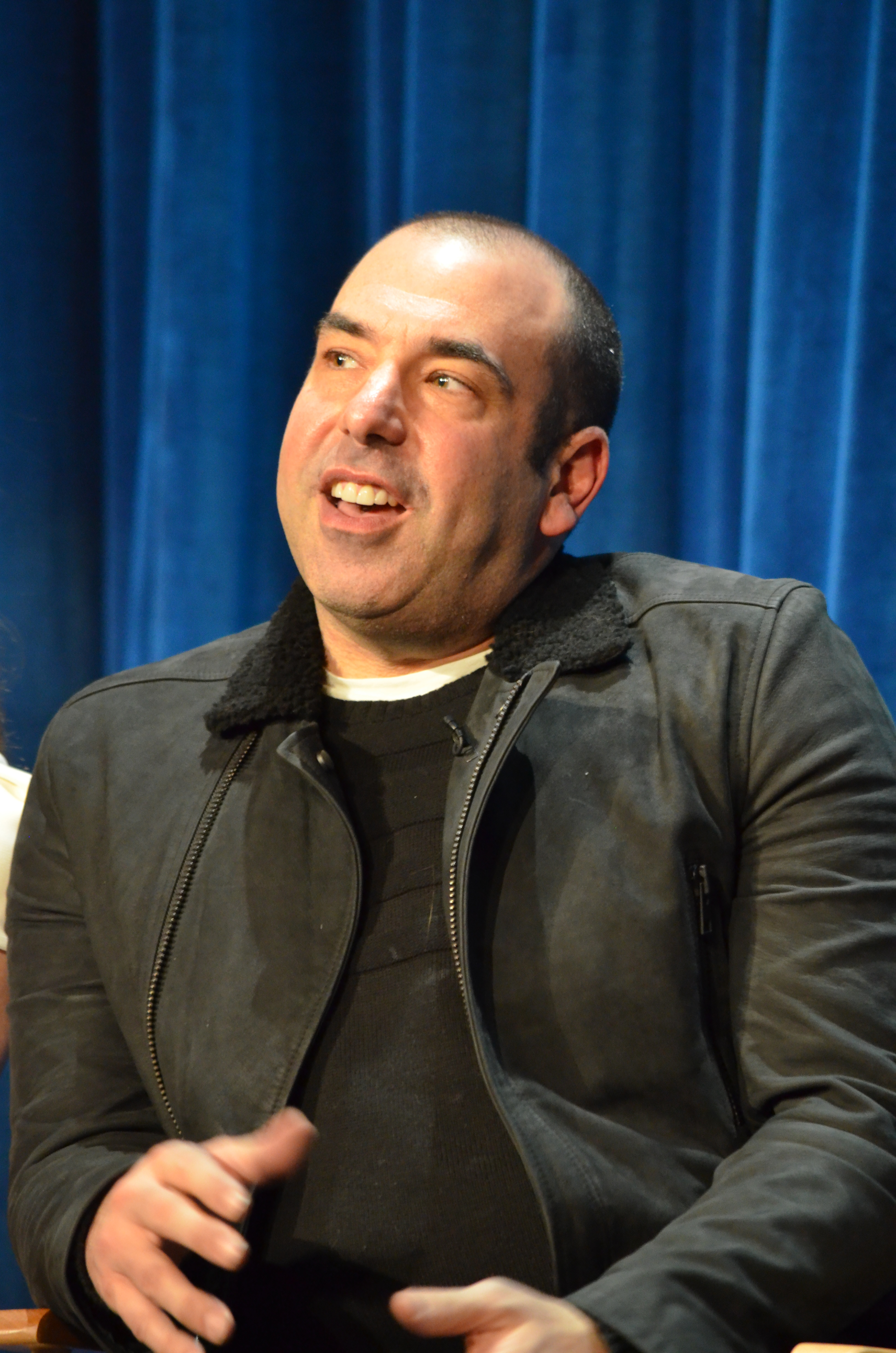
- Hoffman in 2013
- Born: June 12, 1970 (age 56); New York City, U.S.
- Occupation: Actor
- Years active: 1997–present
- Children: 2

Rick Hoffman (born June 12, 1970) is an American actor. He is known for playing Jerry Best in the Fox sitcom The Bernie Mac Show (2002–2005), Chase Chapman in the ABC comedy series Samantha Who? (2007–2009) and Louis Litt in the USA Network legal drama series Suits (2011–2019).

== Early life ==
Hoffman was born in New York City to Charles and Gail Hoffman. He grew up in a Jewish family in Roslyn Heights on Long Island with his brother Jeff Hoffman. He graduated from The Wheatley School in Old Westbury, before attending the University of Arizona, majoring in theater arts. After graduating, he moved to Los Angeles, California, to start an acting career.

== Career ==
Hoffman was cast in his first role, as a security guard in Conspiracy Theory, in 1997. He had some other small roles until he received a main role as Freddie Sacker on Darren Star's short-lived Wall Street series The $treet in 2000, which was pulled from the airwaves after seven episodes, but which allowed him to quit his job waiting tables and move back to New York. His subsequent TV roles included Terry Loomis on the short-lived Steven Bochco law drama Philly in 2001–2002, Jerry Best in The Bernie Mac Show (2002–2005), Patrick Van Dorn on the John Stamos comedy Jake in Progress (2004–2005) and Chase Chapman on the ABC comedy Samantha Who? (2007–2009). In 2011, he landed a starring role as Louis Litt in the USA Network series Suits, which ran until 2019. Hoffman reprises his role in the spinoff series Suits LA.

His other TV and film work includes The Day After Tomorrow, Blood Work, Hostel, Cellular and The Condemned. He has also appeared as a guest in CSI: Miami, Chuck, The Pretender, Law & Order: Special Victims Unit, NCIS, Crossing Jordan, Without a Trace, The Practice, CSI: NY, CSI: Crime Scene Investigation, Shark, Lie to Me, Andy Richter Controls the Universe, Monk, Billions, and The Mentalist.

== Filmography ==
=== Film ===
Year	Title	Role	Notes
1997	Conspiracy Theory	Security guard	
1997	The Fanatics	Protestor	
1998	Johnny Skidmarks	Bartender	
1998	Lethal Weapon 4	Police officer	
2000	What Planet Are You From?	Doctor	
2000	A Better Way to Die	Regis	
2002	Blood Work	James Lockridge	
2003	I Love Your Work	Louis	
2004	The Day After Tomorrow	New York businessman	Uncredited
2004	Our Time Is Up	Gay man	Short film
2004	Cellular	Lawyer	
2005	Hostel	American client	
2007	Smiley Face	Angry Face	
2007	The Condemned	Goldy	
2007	Hostel: Part II	American client	Archive footage
2007	Postal	Mr. Blither	
2014	Locker 13	Armando	
2023	Thanksgiving	Thomas Wright	
2024	London Calling	Benson Abrams	
2026	Office Romance	Carl Gunderson	
2026	Madden	Howard Cosell	

=== Television ===
Year	Title	Role	Notes
1996	Masked Rider	Pizza Man	Episode: "Ferbus' Day Out"
1997	Alright Already	Robber	Episode: "Again with the Porno Video"
1997	The Pretender	Photographer	Episode: "Exposed"
1999	V.I.P.	Tino Scarlatti	Episode: "Big Top Val"
1999	Providence	Benji Brickman	Episode: "Sail Away"
2000	The $treet	Freddie Sacker	12 episodes
2001–2002	Philly	Terry Loomis	22 episodes
2002–2005	The Bernie Mac Show	Jerry Best	10 episodes
2002	Andy Richter Controls the Universe	Arnich	Episode: "Pilot"
2002	Crossing Jordan	Phil Berman	Episode: "As If by Fate"
2003	Miss Match	Kate's Auction Date / Consultant at the Bar	2 episodes
2003, 2009	CSI: Miami	Bruno Gomez / Darren Ripley	2 episodes
2004	The Practice	D.A. Harvey Clarke	3 episodes
2004	Monk	Agent Kohlms	Episode: "Monk Meets the Godfather"
2005–2006	Jake in Progress	Patrick Van Dorn	Main role (20 episodes)
2005	CSI: NY	Dr. Miles Feldstein	Episode: "Manhattan Manhunt"
2006	Commander in Chief	Lance Addison	2 episodes
2006	American Dad!	Caroler #1 / John Hinckley Jr. (voice)	Episode: "The Best Christmas Story Never Told"
2007	Shark	Sam Harris	Episode: "Here Comes the Judge"
2007	Chuck	Agent Scary	Episode: "Chuck Versus the Sandworm"
2007	CSI: Crime Scene Investigation	Michael Raykirk	Episode: "Cockroaches"
2007–09	Samantha Who?	Chase Chapman	Recurring role, 9 episodes
2008	Law & Order: Special Victims Unit	Gary Lesley	Episode: "Closet"
2008	Las Vegas	Scott Noel	Episode: "2 on 2"
2008	NCIS	Kelvin Ridgeway	Episode: "In the Zone"
2008	Leverage	Alan Foss	Episode: "The Two-Horse Job"
2009	Knight Rider	Christopher Stevens	2 episodes
2009	Lie to Me	Peters	Episode: "The Best Policy"
2010	Better Off Ted	Veridian Foundation Head	Episode: "Mess of a Salesman"
2010	Numb3rs	Award Show Producer	Episode: "And the Winner is..."
2010	The Mentalist	Christopher Lynch	Episode: "Red Letter"
2010	Dark Blue	Billy Hoffman	Episode: "High Rollers"
2010	Human Target	Shelly	Episode: "Ilsa Pucci"
2011	Law & Order: LA	Attorney Miller	Episode: "Carthay Circle"
2011–2019	Suits	Louis Litt	Main role (134 episodes)
2016	Ballers	NFL PA Rep	Episode: "Most Guys"
2019	Pearson	Louis Litt	Episode: "The Political Wife"
2020–2023	Billions	Dr. Swerdlow	Recurring role
2023	Round and Round	Stan	Television film
2025	Suits LA	Louis Litt	Episode: "Angry Sylvester"
TBA	Bishop †	Martin Stone	Guest star

Key
†	Denotes television productions that have not yet been released
