= Sarah Rafferty =

American actress

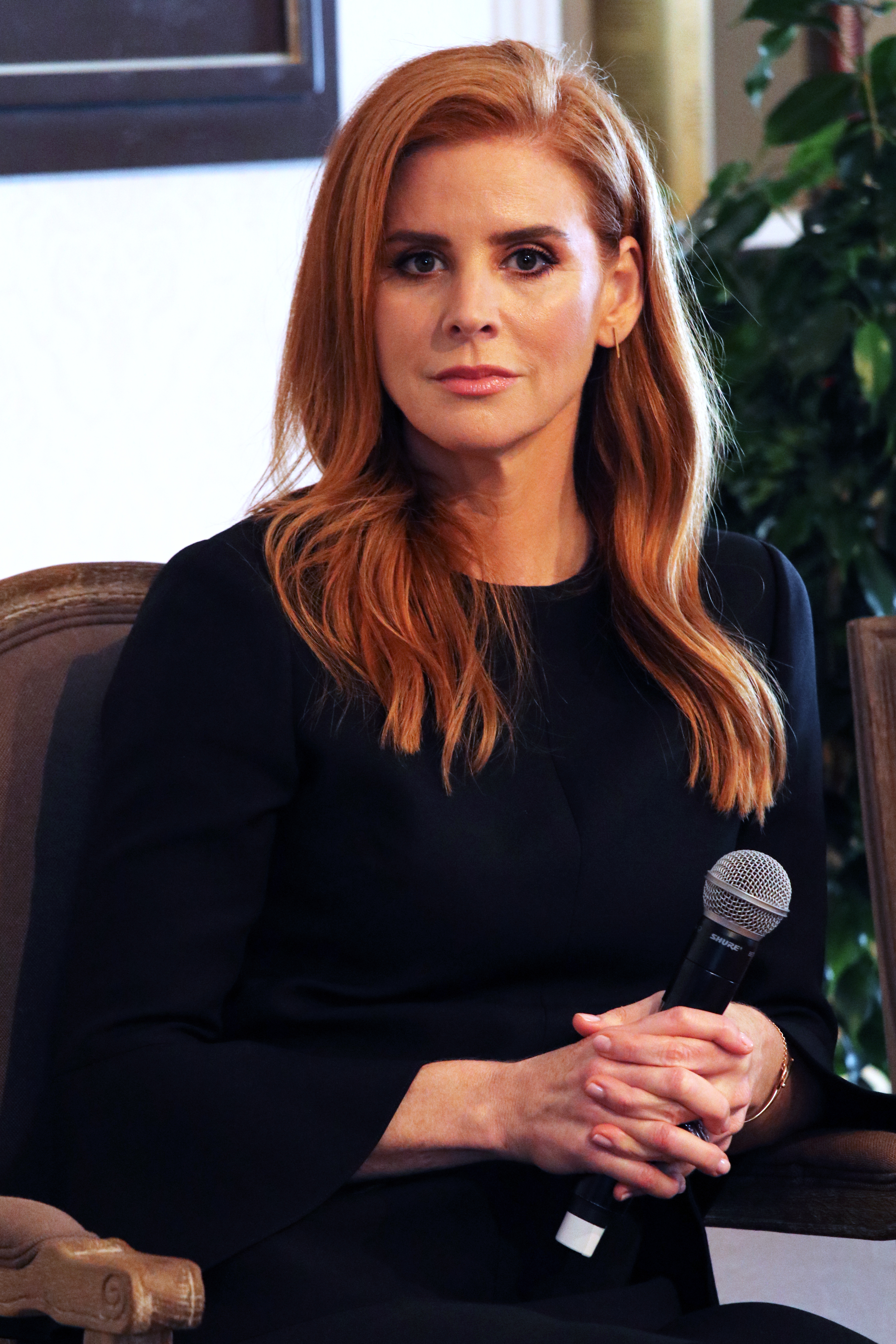
- Born: December 6, 1972 (age 53); New Canaan, Connecticut, U.S.
- Education: Hamilton College (BA); Yale University (MFA)
- Occupation: Actress
- Years active: 1990s–present
- Spouse: Aleksanteri Olli-Pekka Seppälä (m. 2001)
- Children: 2

Sarah Rafferty (born December 6, 1972) is an American actress, best known for her role as Donna Paulsen on the USA Network legal drama Suits and for her role as Katherine Walter on the American teen drama My Life with the Walter Boys, for which she received a Children's and Family Emmy Award nomination in the Outstanding Supporting Performer category. She currently co-hosts a podcast with her fellow Suits co-star Patrick J. Adams called Sidebar, with them watching through an episode of the legal drama with each episode.

== Early life and education ==
Rafferty grew up as the youngest of four daughters in the Riverside neighborhood of Greenwich, Connecticut; she studied at Phillips Academy in Andover, Massachusetts, graduating in 1989. Majoring in English and Theatre at Hamilton College, she studied theatre in the United Kingdom at the University of Oxford during her junior year and, after graduating magna cum laude from Hamilton in 1993, went on to study at the Yale School of Drama, where she received a Master of Fine Arts.

== Personal life ==
Rafferty's husband is Aleksanteri Olli-Pekka Seppälä, an American of Finnish descent and the Vice President of Strategy and Business Development at the Angeleno Group, a venture capital firm. They married on June 23, 2001, at the St. Mary Church in Greenwich, Connecticut, and have two daughters.

== Filmography ==
=== Film ===
Year	Title	Role	Notes
2000	Mambo Café	Amy	
2002	Speakeasy	Nurse	
2004	Soccer Dog: European Cup	Cora Stone	
2006	Falling for Grace	Sydney	
2006	The Devil Wears Prada	Liz	Deleted scene
2009	Four Single Fathers	Julia	
2011	Small, Beautifully Moving Parts	Emily	
2016	All Things Valentine	Avery	

=== Television ===
Year	Title	Role	Notes
1998	Trinity	Sarah	Television film
1999	Law & Order	Jennifer Shaliga	Episode: "Ambitious"
2001	Walker, Texas Ranger	Laura Pope	Episode: "Desperate Measures"
2002	Third Watch	Kelly	Episode: "Crash and Burn"
2002	CSI: Miami	Melissa Starr	Episode: "Breathless"
2002	The District	Sally	Episode: "Small Packages"
2003	Without a Trace	Dr. Patty Morrison	Episode: "The Friendly Skies"
2003	Six Feet Under	Rachel Mortimer	Episode: "The Eye Inside"
2003	The Practice	Judy Wilson	Episode: "Heroes and Villains"
2003	Tremors	Dr. Casey Matthews	Episodes: "Flora or Fauna", "Graboid Rights", "Water Hazard"
2003	Good Morning, Miami	Lila	Episode: "The Ex Games"
2004	CSI: Crime Scene Investigation	Terry Minden	Episode: "Eleven Angry Jurors"
2004	Charmed	Carol	Episode: "The Legend of Sleepy Halliwell"
2004	Second Time Around	Daphne Fitzgerald	Episodes: "Pilot", "Secrets"
2004	8 Simple Rules	Danielle	Episode: "A Very C.J. Christmas"
2006	Pepper Dennis	Callie	Episode: "Heiress Bridenapped: Film at Eleven"
2007	Football Wives	Kelly Cooper	Television film
2007	What If God Were the Sun?	Rachel	Television film
2008	Samantha Who?	Kayla Kaminski	Episode: "So I Think I Can Dance"
2009	Law & Order: Criminal Intent	Sandra Dunbar / Sandra O'Bannon	Episode: "Passion"
2009	Numb3rs	Margo	Episode: "7 Men Out"
2009	Bones	Katie Selnick	Episode: "The Foot in the Foreclosure"
2010	Brothers & Sisters	Gloria Pierson-Davenport	Episode: "A Righteous Kiss"
2011–2019	Suits	Donna Paulsen	Main role, 132 episodes
2016	All Things Valentine	Avery Parker	Television film
2020	Grey's Anatomy	Suzanne	Recurring role
2021–2022	Chicago Med	Dr. Pamela Blake	Recurring role
2023–present	My Life with the Walter Boys	Dr. Katherine Walter	Main role
