= Michael Howard (filmmaker) =

American actor and filmmaker

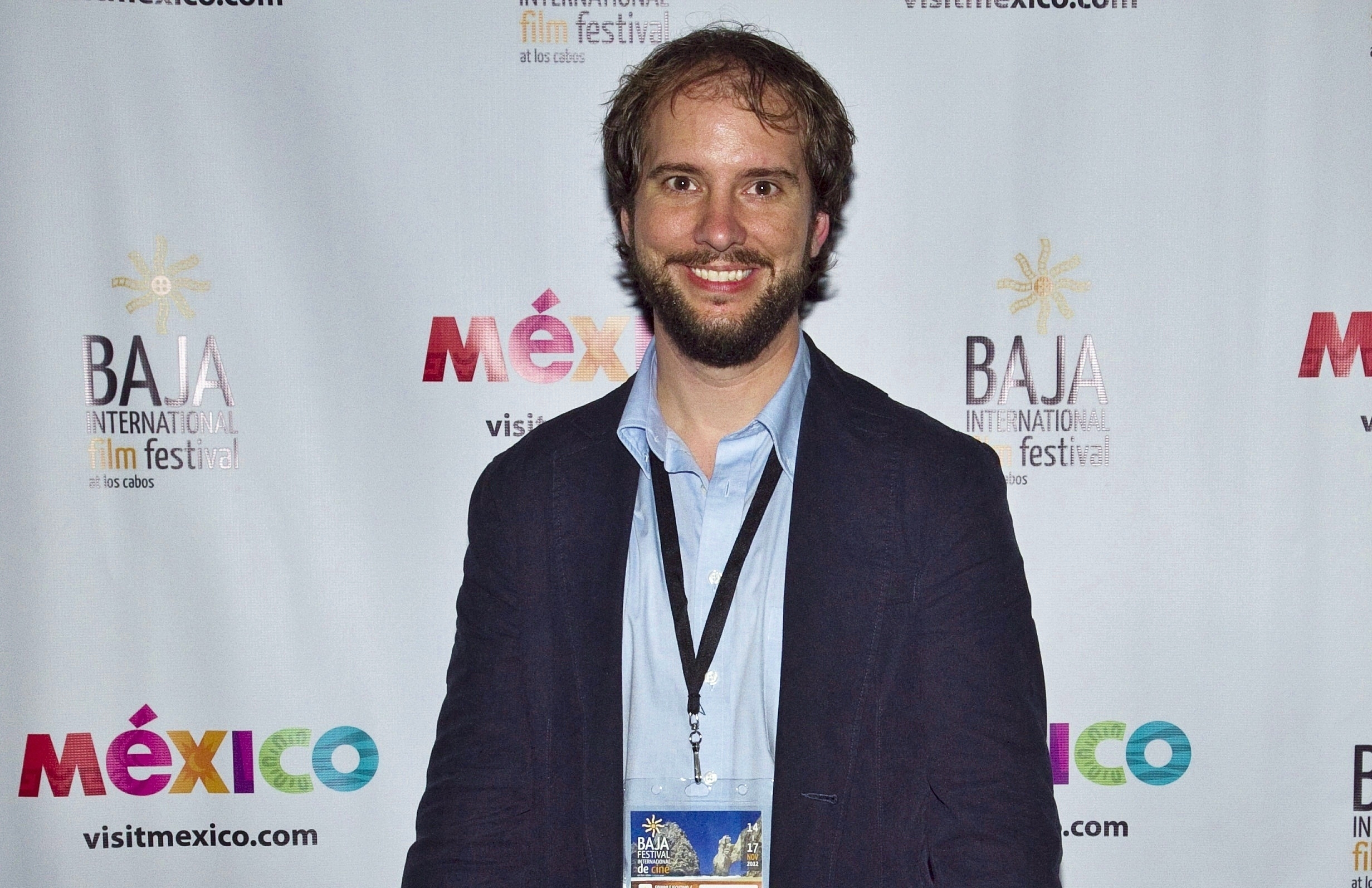
- Born: Michael Lee Howard; February 18, 1978 (age 48); San Antonio, Texas, United States
- Occupations: Actor, film director, editor, screenwriter, and film producer
- Years active: 1998–present
- Website: Official site

Michael Howard (born Feb 18, 1978) is an American actor, film director, screenwriter, cinematographer, and founder of the film company Invisible Productions.

== Background ==
Howard's acting career began at a young age when he made an appearance on Snowball Satellite TV in Germany and acted in the 'Twas the Night Before Christmas play in middle school. He attended High School at Charles M. Russell High School and was in numerous choirs and did some acting as well. After High School, he was premed in college pursuing a degree in biology in Alaska and became an Emergency medical technician and worked in an emergency room. He landed a lead role in a local play and then after receiving an associate degree from the University of Alaska, Howard promptly quit medicine and started studying filmmaking and acting. In 1998, he read and reviewed scripts for American Zoetrope while writing his first screenplay, Reality of Life. Howard then got his Bachelors degree in Recording Arts at the University of Colorado Colorado Springs and created his own indie film company by the name of Invisible Productions. His company has produced short films, documentaries, and features.

== Career ==
While studying medicine in Alaska, Howard landed a starring role in Jugger's Rain and Tony n' Tina's Wedding which eventually led into his film career. While making films, Howard continued acting in the theatre at times with Theatreworks in Colorado in roles for To Kill a Mockingbird, Romeo and Juliet, and King Lear.

One of Howard's early short films entitled Lost garnered him awards for Best Actor at the 2004 Biarritz International Short Film Festival and Best Screenplay at the 2004 Festival de Cine Internacional de Barcelona. He was also nominated for Best Actor and Best Film at the New York Short Film Festival and Best Performance at the San Francisco Short Film Festival.

His first feature film was that of his first screenplay, Reality of Life. Howard also directed it and took on a supporting actor role and the film went on to play in Los Angeles and New York.

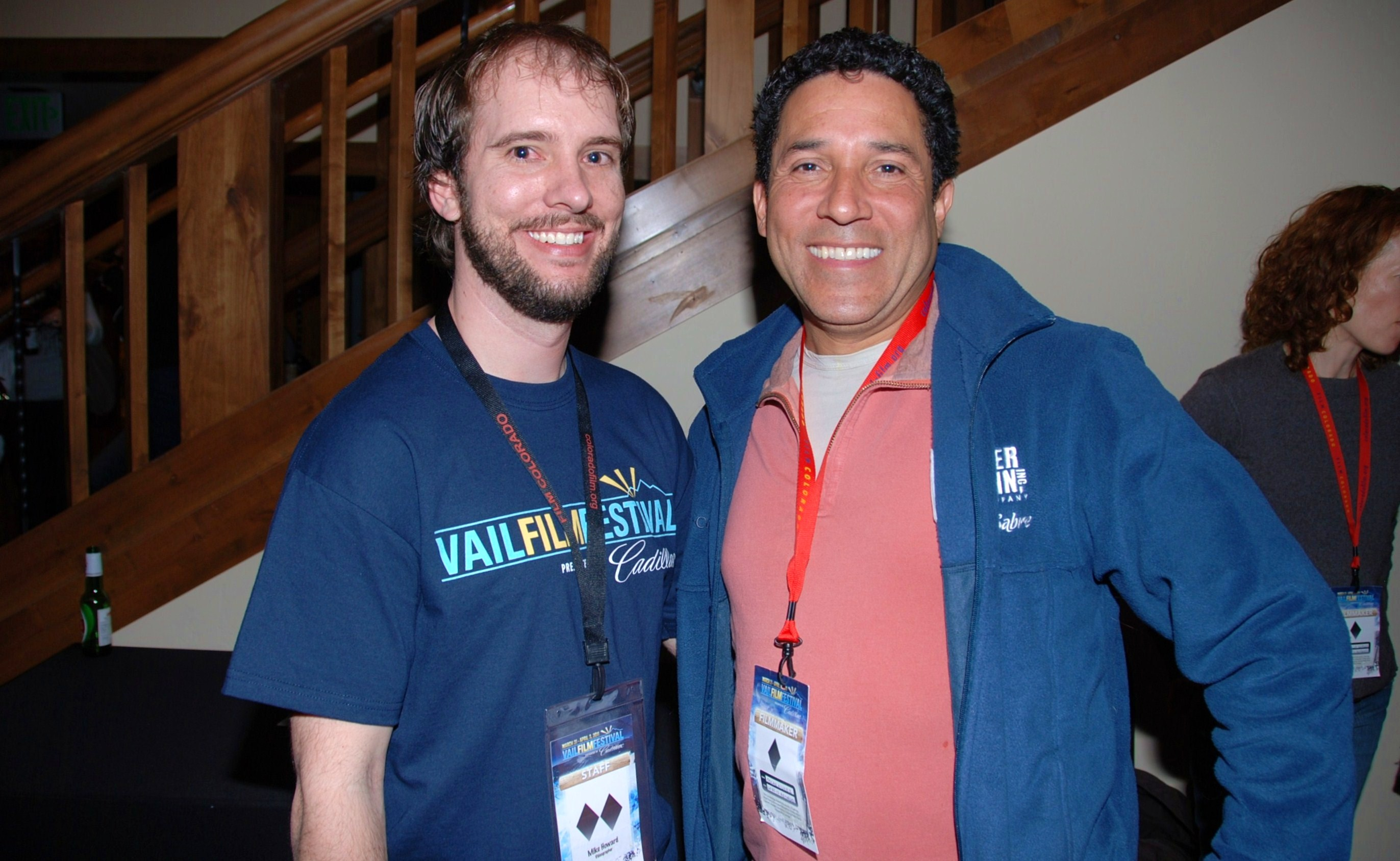
Michael Howard and Oscar Nunez at the 2011 Vail Film Festival

In 2007, Howard was brought onto the Vail Film Festival by Sean Cross and Scott Cross to be the official videographer for the festival and to shoot and edit the festival including promotions, award ceremonies, parties, screenings, red carpet, and interviews. Howard handles the still photography and videography throughout the festival. This also led to editing commercials for Comcast cable including promotions for companies including Cadillac, Stella Artois, and Audi. He continues in the position presently.

Howard created a commercial for Canon that advertised the XL-1. A parody on drug addiction, the commercial showed a camera being borrowed for a short time from a dealer in an alley and as soon as a customer starts running around using it, it is stolen by another camera junkie. In 2008, Howard was invited into the worldwide photography project called The Head Project. Photographers received a mannequin head in the mail to use for two weeks and then sent it to a photographer in a different country. Howard was one of the few chosen from the United States and the only artist from the state of North Carolina.

Due to his success with the Vail Film Festival, Howard was brought onto the Los Cabos International Film Festival as the official videographer for their inaugural edition. It launched in Los Cabos from 14 to 17 November 2012 with Edward Norton as the official festival adviser.

Howard co-directed the 2012 Hint Fiction Film Contest with actor/host Bill LeVasseur, based on the published collection of short stories also entitled Hint Fiction. The contest finalists screened at the Vail Film Festival and Howard and LeVasseur spoke about the contest and filmmaking in the short form afterward. The contest gave aspiring filmmakers a chance to work with stories written by Ernest Hemingway, Édith Piaf, or Eric Hsu in creating their 60-second film. Howard brought on writer/filmmaker Kevin Smith and filmmaker/photographer Tao Ruspoli to be celebrity judges for the contest.

Howard wrote and directed his second feature film entitled Where We're Meant to Be and it stars Blayne Weaver (Manic, Return to Never Land), Tate Hanyok (The Mentalist, Shameless), and Sarah Bousquet. The film travels in and out of the lives of a number of different characters as each one connects to the next during their most pivotal moments. It began its festival run in 2016 and was picked up for distribution by Turn Key Films in 2017. During its festival run, the film won multiple Best Film awards as well as awards for Best Screenplay, Audience Award, and various awards for its castmembers. The film also garnered additional nominations for Best Film and a variety of acting roles. The score was written by Steven Grove and the soundtrack consists of songs from Greg Laswell, Cary Brothers, Jack the Radio, Day at the Fair, Buddy (band), Tom Rosenthal (musician), Butterfly Boucher, and other indie artists from around the world. It was released in the United States and the United Kingdom via Flix Premiere in July 2017. Reviews consisted of lines such as "A thoughtful, beautiful film full of love and emotion…it might just change how you see the world.", "...bravely written script with heartfelt dialogue as well as compelling character development.", “An inventive and exciting approach to storytelling.”, and "Where We're Meant to Be is an indie gem.".

== Filmography ==
Film credits
| Year | Film | Role | Notes |
|---|---|---|---|
| 2001 | Chronic Jaywalking | Actor | |
| 2001 | Nemesis Rising: The Airband | Director, Actor | Winner: Best Comedy - Blissfest; Winner: Best Narrative Short - Denver Underground Film Festival |
| 2001 | Pushed | Director, Actor | Nominated: Judge's Pick - Panhandle Picture Show |
| 2001 | Suicide Run | Script Supervisor | |
| 2002 | Reality of Life | Director, Writer, Actor | |
| 2002 | Simon | Actor | |
| 2002 | Beccerra | Director of Photography | |
| 2003 | Lost | Director, Writer, Actor | Winner: Best Actor - Festival de Biarritz; Winner: Best Screenplay - Barcelona Cinema Festival; Nominated: Best Film - New York Short Film Festival; Nominated: Best Actor - New York Short Film Festival; Nominated: Best Actor - San Francisco Short Film Festival |
| 2011 | Let Tyrants Fear | Actor | |
| 2012 | The Flower | Cinematographer (Co) | |
| 2012 | Baby Shoes | Director, Screenwriter | Winner: Best Film - Denver Underground Film Festival; Winner: Best Editing - Denver Underground Film Festival; Honorable Mention: Best Short Film - WV Mountaineer Film Fest |
| 2013 | The Agent | Actor | |
| 2013 | Box Brown | Actor | |
| 2014 | The Session | Actor | |
| 2014 | Split Second | Writer | |
| 2015 | Beyond the Blue (docu.) | Self | |
| 2015 | Halcyon | Assistant Editor | |
| 2016 | Where We're Meant To Be | Director, Writer, Actor | Winner: Best Film - filmSPARK Film Festival; Winner: Best Film - Eastern NC Film Festival; Winner: Best Feature Film - Raleigh Film Festival; Winner: Audience Award - Los Angeles CineFest; Winner: Best Screenplay - Cape Fear Independent Film Festival; Winner: President's Award - North Carolina Film Awards; Winner: Audience Award - Eastern NC Film Festival; Winner: Best Supp. Actor (Seth Gore) - Eastern NC Film Festival; Winner: Best Supp. Actress (Anna Nalepka) - Asheville Film Festival; Winner: Best of Fest & Best Dramatic Trailer - Skyphire Film Festival; Nominated: Best Film - Los Angeles CineFest; Nominated: Best Film - Cape Fear Independent Film Festival; Nominated: Best Film - Asheville Film Festival; Nominated: Best Film - Garden City Int’l Film Festival; Nominated: Best Supp. Actor (Jack Harrison) - Asheville Film Festival; Nominated: Best Actress (Tracey Coppedge) - Eastern NC Film Festival; Nominated: Best Supp. Actor (Blayne Weaver) - Eastern NC Film Festival; Nominated: Best Supp. Actress (Anna Nalepka) - Eastern NC Film Festival |
| 2017 | Vigilance | Actor | |
| 2017 | The Believers | Actor | |
| 2019 | Poppy and Margot | Actor | |
| 2019 | In Limbo | Actor | |
| 2019 | Going Down Slow | Actor | |
| 2020 | Epiphany Road | Actor | |
| 2021 | Bind | Writer | Winner: Best Writing, Runner-up - Greensboro 48 Hour Film Project |
| 2021 | Mallory (docu.) | Editing Supervisor | |
| 2022 | History's Heroes: The Rusty Bucket Kids | Actor | |

Television credits
| Year | Show | Role | Notes |
|---|---|---|---|
| 2009 | Backyard Genius | Editor | Episode 1.2, "Marlin Condo" |
| 2012-2013 | Revolution | Actor | Episode 1.4: "The Plague Dogs"; Episode 1.17: "The Longest Day"; Episode 1.18: "Clue" |
| 2013 | American Detours | Cinematographer/Editor | Episode 1.5 and 1.6: West Virginia; Special Edition: New Jersey: Hurricane Sandy (1.7 and 1.8); Episode 2.1 and 2.2: Lake Tahoe; Episode 2.3 and 2.4: Iowa; Episode 2.5 and 2.6: Texas (Editor only) |
| 2015 | The Setlist | Camera Operator | |
| 2019-2020 | The Disappearance of Robert Bee | Writer/Editor | Season 1, Episodes 1-10 |
| 2020 | The Ericka James Show | Cinematographer | |
| 2022 | The Shepherd | Actor | In production |
