= Where We're Meant to Be =

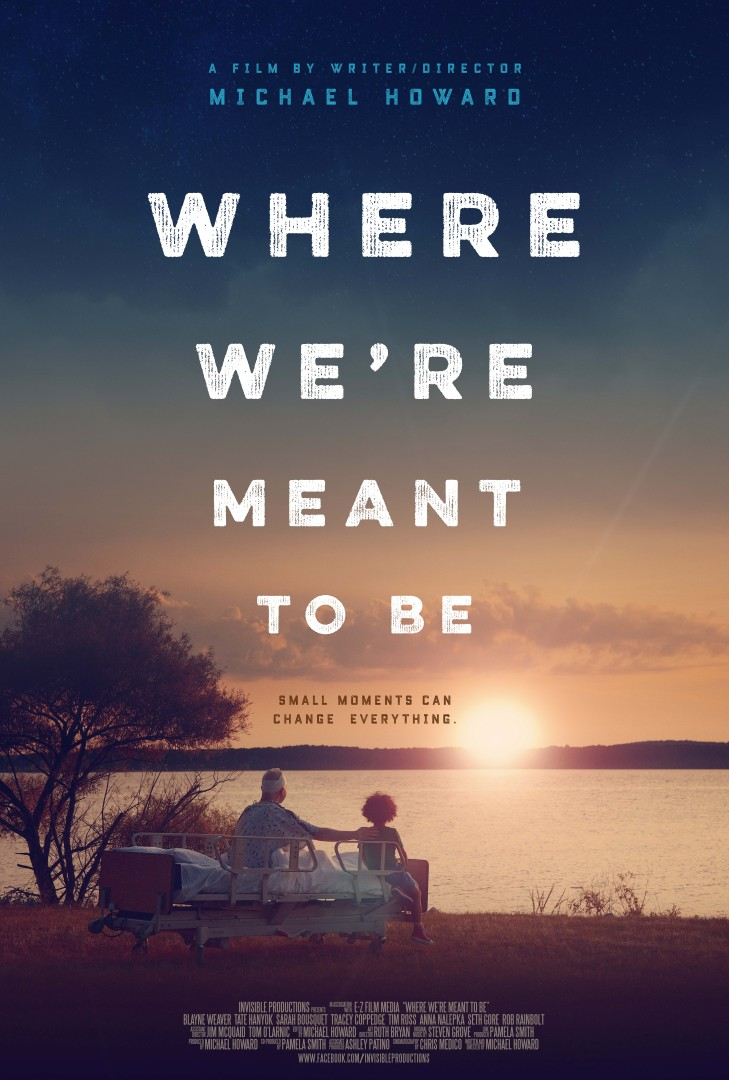
- Official poster
- Directed by: Michael Howard
- Written by: Michael Howard
- Starring: Blayne Weaver; Tate Hanyok; Sarah Bousquet; Tracey Coppedge; Tim Ross; Anna Nalepka; Seth Nicholas Gore
- Cinematography: Chris Medico
- Edited by: Michael Howard
- Production company: Invisible Productions
- Distributed by: TurnKey Films
- Release dates: April 8, 2016 (Vail Film Festival); July 7, 2017
- Running time: 113 minutes
- Country: United States
- Language: English
- Budget: $35,000

Where We're Meant to Be is a 2016 American drama film written and directed by Michael Howard. The film travels in and out of the lives of a number of different characters as each one connects to the next during their most pivotal moments.

The film won multiple awards during its film festival run and was picked up for distribution by TurnKey Films in 2017. It was released via Flix Premiere in July 2017.

== Plot ==
The film consists of multiple storylines and each story has a character or incident that changes the life of another character in a variety of ways. Some interactions are very direct while others may be small, seemingly inconsequential, moments that have just as large of an impact. The film explores these moments and more as we see into various lives during certain vital moments.

The stories broadly consist of:

- A couple on a blind date.
- A sister deals with loss concerning her brother and nephew.
- An older woman dating a younger man must choose between her relationship and her children.
- An FBI surveillance team oversees an abduction and the resulting fallout.
- A teenage boy and girl attempt their first sexual experience.
- An engaged mother of two deals with an unexpected illness.
- A married couple struggle with the thought of parenting.

== Primary cast ==
- Blayne Weaver as Charlie
- Tate Hanyok as Anna
- Sarah Bousquet as Samantha
- Meredith Sause as Beth
- Lex Wilson as Cameron
- Harper Grimmett as Finn
- Tracey Coppedge as Carrie
- Tim Ross as Bobby
- Anna Nalepka as Wendy
- Seth Nicholas Gore as Will
- Rob Rainbolt as Peter
- Michael Howard as John
- Don Sill as Chad
- Shalita McFarland as Tisha
- Thaddaeus Edwards as Walter
- Eric Pastore as Jeff
- Stephanie Minervino as Katie
- Christopher Houldsworth as Mac
- Jack Harrison as Ferrante
- Pepi Streiff as Granny

== Production ==
Where We're Meant to Be was filmed on a budget of $25,000 over 23 days between May and July 2015. The film was shot on location in North Carolina with filming taking place in Raleigh, Durham, Apex, Roxboro, Cary and Fuquay-Varina.

== Music ==
The score was written by Steven Grove and the soundtrack consists of songs from Greg Laswell, Cary Brothers, Jack the Radio, Day at the Fair, Buddy (band), Tom Rosenthal (musician), Butterfly Boucher, and other indie artists from around the world.

== Themes ==
The central theme of the film is connection and how small moments that seem inconsequential can make a huge difference in a life. And since you don't know what moments can make the difference, there's no point in stressing out about it. Howard says of the theme that "one of the most important aspects is to just live your life regardless of what's happening around you. If you're worried or stressed out about something, it's not going to do any good to shut down and not keep moving on. And whether the situation turns out good or bad, there was still so much wasted time in that interim. It's not how much time you have; it's how you use that time that makes all the difference.

== Reception ==
The film had its world premiere on April 8, 2016 at the Vail Film Festival and continued on with a successful film festival run. It garnered more than a dozen award wins and nominations throughout the festival circuit and was picked up for distribution by TurnKey Films in 2017.

=== Critical reception ===
Where We're Meant to Be received positive reviews from critics.

Reel Honest Reviews: "A thoughtful, beautiful film full of love and emotion. Creating such a philosophical and entertaining film on this budget should be lauded as a true accomplishment. Be sure to catch this film...it might just change how you see the world."

Indie Spotlight Network: "...bravely written script with heartfelt dialogue as well as compelling character development."

The Independent Critic: "Where We're Meant to be is an indie gem" and "emotionally honest story and performances along with an uncommon intelligence that permeates through every digital cell of the film."

=== Accolades ===
Festival	Year	Award Category	Recipient	Result
filmSPARK Film Festival	2016	Best Film (Best of Fest)	Where We're Meant to Be	Won
Raleigh Film Festival	2016	Best Feature Film	Where We're Meant to Be	Won
Los Angeles Cinefest	2016	Audience Award Best Film	Where We're Meant to Be	Won
Los Angeles Cinefest	2016	Best Feature Film	Where We're Meant to Be	Nominated
North Carolina Film Awards	2016	President's Award	Michael Howard	Won
Cape Fear Independent Film Festival	2017	Best Screenplay - "Don Award"	Michael Howard	Won
Cape Fear Independent Film Festival	2017	Best Feature Film	Where We're Meant to Be	Nominated
Eastern NC Film Festival	2016	Best Film	Where We're Meant to Be	Won
Eastern NC Film Festival	2016	Audience - "Distance Award"	Where We're Meant to Be	Won
Eastern NC Film Festival	2016	Best Supporting Actor	Seth Nicholas Gore	Won
Eastern NC Film Festival	2016	Best Actress	Tracey Coppedge	Nominated
Eastern NC Film Festival	2016	Best Supporting Actress	Anna Nalepka	Nominated
Eastern NC Film Festival	2016	Best Supporting Actor	Blayne Weaver	Nominated
GardenCity International Film Festival	2017	Best Feature Film	Where We're Meant to Be	Nominated
Asheville Film Festival	2016	Best Supporting Actress	Anna Nalepka	Won
Asheville Film Festival	2016	Best Film	Where We're Meant to Be	Nominated
Asheville Film Festival	2016	Best Supporting Actor	Jack Harrison	Nominated

== Release ==
TurnKey Films released the film via Flix Premiere in the United Kingdom on 30 June 2017 and the United States on 7 July 2017.
