= Greg Laswell discography =

- Studio albums: 9
- Extended plays: 3
- Singles: 10

This is the discography of Greg Laswell, an American singer-songwriter. Overall, Laswell has released 9 studio albums, 3 extended plays and 10 iTunes music singles.

== Albums ==
=== Studio albums ===
Year	Album details	Track listing	US chart performance
2003	Good Movie: Released: December 8, 2003; Label: All the Rest Records [Independent]	1. Bright Ideas; 2. Back to June; 3. Carry Me Through; 4. Tirade; 5. 19" Life; 6. 7:00 AM; 7. Good Movie; 8. Head for Today; 9. Father of Your Billies; 10. Circle Around Again; 11. You So Bright; 12. New Day; 13. Me First	Did not chart
2006	Through Toledo: Released: July 11, 2006; Label: Vanguard	1. Sing, Theresa Says; 2. Amazed; 3. Worthwhile; 4. Do What I Can; 5. High and Low; 6. Same As You; 7. Through Toledo; 8. I'm Hit; 9. Long Way Around; 10. Come Undone; 11. Your Melody; 12. December (Bonus track - iTunes US)	Did not chart
2008	Three Flights from Alto Nido: Released: July 8, 2008; Label: Vanguard	1. It's Been a Year; 2. That It Moves; 3. The One I Love; 4. Comes and Goes (In Waves); 5. How the Day Sounds; 6. Sweet Dream; 7. Days Go On; 8. I'd Be Lying; 9. Farewell; 10. Not Out; 11. And Then You; 12. That It Moves (GarageBand Demo) (Bonus track)	Billboard 200: #181 Heatseekers Albums: #13
2010	Take a Bow: Released: May 4, 2010; Label: Vanguard	1. Take Everything; 2. My Fight (For You); 3. Lie To Me; 4. Come Clean; 5. Around The Bend; 6. Take A Bow; 7. In Front Of Me; 8. You, Now; 9. Marquee; 10. Off I Go; 11. Let It Ride; 12. Goodbye; 13. Eyes on You (Bonus track - iTunes US); 13. Nickels and Dimes (Bonus track - amazon.com); 14. Goodbye (Acoustic Version) (Bonus track - amazon.com)	Billboard 200: #197 Heatseekers Albums: #3; Independent Albums: #33
2012	Landline: Released: April 24, 2012; Label: Vanguard	1. Come Back Down (feat. Sara Bareilles); 2. I Might Drop By; 3. Another Life to Lose; 4. Eyes On You (Redux); 5. Back to You (feat. Elizabeth Ziman); 6. Late Arriving; 7. Dragging You Around (feat. Sia); 8. Nicely Played; 9. New Year's Eves; 10. It's Settled Now; 11. Landline (feat. Ingrid Michaelson); 12. She Tears It Out of Me (Bonus Track - iTunes)	Billboard 200: #96 Independent Albums: #17
2014	I Was Going to Be an Astronaut: Released: February 11, 2014; Label: Vanguard	1. I Don't Believe It's Through (2013 Remake); 2. It's a Wonderful Life (Sparklehorse Cover); 3. Comes and Goes (In Waves) (2013 Remake); 4. What a Day (2013 Remake); 5. How the Day Sounds (2013 Remake); 6. December (2013 Remake); 7. Off I Go (2013 Remake); 8. Take Everything (2013 Remake); 9. Embrace Me (2013 Remake); 10. High and Low (2013 Remake); 11. And Then You (2013 Remake)	Did not chart
2016	Everyone Thinks I Dodged a Bullet: Released: March 4, 2016; Label: Vanguard	1. Dodged a Bullet; 2. Lifetime Ago; 3. Out of Line; 4. And So I Tried to Sleep; 5. Watch You Burn; 6. Not the Same Man; 7. Birthday Wish; 8. Take It Easy; 9. Play That One Again; 10. Not Surprised	Did not chart
2018	Next Time: Released: September 21, 2018; Label: Leg Graswell	1. Royal Empress; 2. Next Time; 3. Super Moon; 4. Choice in the Matter; 5. I Will Not Resign; 6. What Do I Know?; 7. Where You Find Me; 8. For You; 9. Do Better; 10. Never Want to See You Again; 11. Next Time (Piano Version)	Did not chart
2019	Covers II: Released: September 13, 2019; Label: Leg Graswell	1. Something in My Heart; 2. Never Let Me Down Again; 3. A Place Called Home; 4. Crank; 5. Lucky Man; 6. Without You I’m Nothing; 7. Love My Way; 8. Don’t Give Up	Did not chart

=== Extended plays ===
Year	Album details	Track listing
2006	Dead Air: Released: Unreleased; Label: Independent	1. Do What I Can; 2. Amazed; 3. Come Undone; 4. Sing, Theresa Says; 5. What a Day
2008	How the Day Sounds: Released: March 11, 2008; Label: Vanguard	1. How the Day Sounds; 2. Salvation Dear; 3. Days Go On; 4. Embrace Me; 5. High and Low (with Edison String Section); 6. What a Day (2008 version)
2009	Covers: Released: October 6, 2009; Label: Vanguard; Chart performance: #38 Billboard Heatseekers Albums	1. The Killing Moon; 2. In Spite of Me; 3. Take Everything; 4. Your Ghost; 5. This Woman's Work

== iTunes singles ==
Year	Single
2006	What a Day: Released: TBC; Label: Vanguard
2006	Sing, Theresa Says: Released: TBC; Label: Vanguard
2007	Girls Just Wanna Have Fun: Released: January 15, 2007; Label: Vanguard
2008	What a Day (2008 version): Released: TBC; Label: Vanguard
2009	Off I Go: Released: TBC; Label: Vanguard
2009	London by Night: Released: June 7, 2009; Label: Vanguard
2010	Take Everything: Released: March 2, 2010; Label: Vanguard
2010	Into the Mystic: Released: September 24, 2010; Label: Vanguard
