= Sean Cross =

American film producer

- Occupations: filmmaker, producer, actor, writer, and co-founder of Vail Film Festival and Los Cabos International Film Festival
- Website: Vailfilmfestival Cabosfilmfestival

Sean Cross is an American filmmaker, producer, actor, writer, and co-founder of the Los Cabos International Film Festival, Colorado Film Institute, and Vail Film Festival.

== Background ==
Cross studied film at New York University. He is the brother of Scott Cross, co-founder of the Los Cabos International Film Festival, Colorado Film Institute, and Vail Film Festival.

== Career ==
Cross is a filmmaker and entrepreneur who has spent over a decade working in film. In 2004, Cross co-founded the Colorado Film Institute and the Vail Film Festival with his brother Scott Cross. In 2006, Cross spearheaded the Vail Film Festival's partnership with Film Your Issue, a national issue film contest, in partnership with the American Democracy Project, featuring 30 to 60-second films. Cross helped grow the Vail Film Festival into a major international film festival, recognized in 2007 as "One of the top ten destination film festivals in the world".

In 2012, Cross co-founded the Los Cabos International Film Festival (Originally named the Baja International Film Festival) with his brother Scott. The inaugural edition took place in Los Cabos from November 14–17, 2012 with Edward Norton as the official festival adviser. The 4th edition took place November 11–15, 2015.
