= Blayne Weaver =

American actor

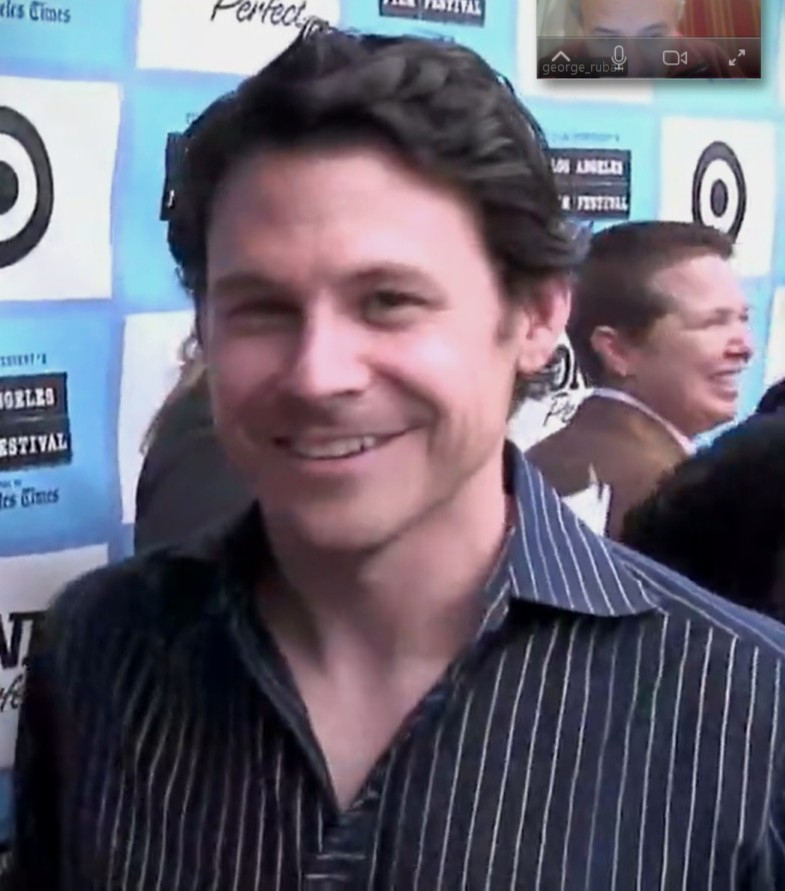
- Weaver in 2009
- Born: April 9, 1976 (age 50); Bossier City, Louisiana, U.S.
- Occupations: Director; screenwriter; actor; producer; teacher
- Years active: 1993–present
- Notable work: Manic (2001); Weather Girl (2009); 6 Month Rule (2011); Cut to the Chase (2016)
- Website: blayneweaver.net

Blayne Nutron Weaver (born April 9, 1976 in Bossier City) is an American director, screenwriter, and actor. Among his better-known films are Manic (2001), Weather Girl (2009), 6 Month Rule (2011), and Cut to the Chase (2016). He has also been the voice of Peter Pan since the 2002 film Return to Never Land. Many of his movies are filmed in the Shreveport area, with several involving Shenandoah's film department to employ cast and crew.

== Early life ==
Weaver was born in Bossier City, Louisiana on April 9, 1976. From age five, Weaver acted in local plays with the Peter Pan Players in Shreveport, and later with Centenary College of Louisiana and River City Repertory Theatre. He was performing in "three shows a year" until he was fifteen, when he began traveling to Dallas to audition for larger roles. After graduating from Parkway High School, he lived in New York City for six months before relocating to Los Angeles.

== Career ==
In the 1990s, Weaver's career was mostly in television. He appeared in the made-for-TV films The Flood: Who Will Save Our Children? (1993) and The Good Old Boys (1995), followed by several bit roles on shows including ER, JAG, and Chicago Hope. In 2001, he became the new voice of Peter Pan. He has since appeared in shows such as House of Mouse and has done recordings for the Disney theme parks, including for Mickey's PhilharMagic (2003). He also provided the voice for Pan in Disney Infinity 3.0 and for Peter Pan Cookie in Cookie Run: Kingdom.

In 2001, Weaver co-wrote the film Manic, which stars Joseph Gordon-Levitt. The film premiered at Sundance Film Festival. In 2004, he formed Secret Identity Productions (SIP) with childhood friend Brandon Barrera. Later that year, they released the short film Losing Lois Lane, which Weaver directed, wrote, and starred in. The film was popular online and was Weaver's directorial debut. Weaver also wrote, directed and starred in SIP's first feature film, Outside Sales, which won awards on the film festival circuit and was later released on DVD. SIP's next feature, Weather Girl, premiered at Slamdance Film Festival and had an ensemble cast of Tricia O'Kelley, Mark Harmon, Jon Cryer, and Jane Lynch. Like SIP's other films, Weaver wrote, directed, and acted in the movie. It was released on Lifetime TV in October 2009 and on DVD following a festival run. It won an award in the category Screenplay: Narrative Feature at the 2009 DeadCENTER Film Festival.

Weaver's next major film was 6 Month Rule in 2011. It starred Martin Starr, Jaime Pressly, John Michael Higgins, and Natalie Morales and won best feature film and best actor (Weaver) at the 2012 Hill Country Film Festival. He had his stage directorial debut in 2015 with the River City Repertory Theatre's production of True West. This was followed by another feature film, Cut to the Chase (2016), which Weaver wrote, directed, and starred in. The film follows an ex-con that sets out in search of his kidnapped sister through the criminal underbelly of Shreveport, Louisiana. This garnered a number of award wins, including best director of a feature and best actor (Weaver) in a feature at the Northeast Film Festival and best director at Hill Country Film Festival. In 2017, he played Black Stache in Peter and the Starcatcher at Stage Center in Shreveport. The company gave him a "Diva" Performance Award.

Weaver's role in Michael Howard's Where We're Meant to Be earned him a nomination for Best Supporting Actor at the Eastern North Carolina Film Festival. His next film, Santa Girl (2019), was released through Netflix and premiered at the Alamo Drafthouse Cinema in Winchester, Virginia. This was one of several films shot in collaboration with Shenandoah University's film department. Also in 2019, he became Shenandoah's first Director in Residence, and later signed on as an adjunct professor of film studies. Other movies filmed with Shenandoah include GetAWAY (2020), Cupid for Christmas (2021), and Miss Valentine (2024). GetAWAY premiered at the DeadCENTER Film Festival in 2020. Also in 2020, Weaver co-wrote American Pie Presents: Girls' Rules with David H. Steinberg. He has been a faculty member of American Musical and Dramatic Academy in camera acting since 2024.

== Acting credits ==
=== Film ===
Year	Title	Role	Notes	Ref
2001	Manic	Charlie		
2001	Mickey's Magical Christmas: Snowed in at the House of Mouse	Peter Pan (voice)	Direct-to-video	
2002	Return to Never Land	Peter Pan (voice)		
2004	The Lion King 1½	Peter Pan (voice)	Cameo Direct-to-video	
2004	Losing Lois Lane	Clark Kent/Superman	Short film	
2006	Outside Sales	Kirk Hastings		
2008	Uncross the Stars	George		
2008	Damn You Stephen Hawking	Stephen Hawking	Short film	
2009	Weather Girl	William		
2009	Official Rejection	Self		
2010	Mr. Autry's Bonus	Mike Fern	Short film	
2011	The FP	Gas Station Attendant		
2011	6 Month Rule	Tyler		
2012	Junk	Eugene		
2013	Favor	Kip		
2013	Deep Dark Canyon	Tom Cavanaugh		
2015	Rag Doll	Man	Short film	
2015	In Progress	Jonas	Short film	
2016	Where We're Meant to Be	Charlie McIntire		
2016	Cut to the Chase	Max Chase		
2016	Hard Sell	Tim		
2019	Ghosted	Ben	Short film	
2020	American Pie Presents: Girls' Rules	Fred Sawyer		
2024	Fluorescent Beast	Mickey Mears		

=== Television ===
Year	Title	Role	Notes	Ref
1993	The Flood: Who Will Save Our Children?	Jeff Bowman	Television film	
1995	The Good Old Boys	Tommy Calloway	Television film	
1995	JAG	Private First Class Douglas	Episode: "War Cries"	
1997	ER	Jeffrey	Episode: "You Bet Your Life"	
1998	Chicago Hope	Luke Serone	Episode: "Broken Hearts"	
1998	Beyond Belief: Fact or Fiction		Episode: "The Chalkboard"	
1998	Winchell	Country Club Worker	Television film	
2002	House of Mouse	Peter Pan (voice)	Episodes: "Donald Wants to Fly", "Super Goof"	
2004	The King of Queens	D.J.	Episode: "Precedent Nixin'"	
2004	NCIS	P.O. Darrell Baum	Episode: "The Good Wives Club"	
2008	The Middleman	Dean Schon	Episode: "The Manicoid Teleportation Conundrum"	
2018	Gone	Father Beiler	Episode: "Secuestrado"	

== Production credits ==
Year	Title	Director	Producer	Writer	Notes	Ref
2001	Manic			Yes	Co-wrote with Michael Bacall	
2004	Losing Lois Lane	Yes	Yes	Yes		
2006	Outside Sales	Yes	Yes	Yes		
2008	The Prince & Me: A Royal Honeymoon			Yes		
2009	Weather Girl	Yes	Yes	Yes		
2010	The Prince & Me: The Elephant Adventure			Yes		
2011	Honey 2			Yes	Co-written with Alyson Fouse	
2011	6 Month Rule	Yes		Yes		
2011	Broken			Yes	Short film	
2012	Akuma			Yes	Co-written with Joe Bockol and Deon Taylor	
2016	Cut to the Chase	Yes		Yes		
2019	Santa Girl	Yes	Yes			
2019	Ghosted	Yes				
2020	GetAWAY	Yes	Yes	Yes		
2020	American Pie Presents: Girls' Rules			Yes	Co-wrote with David H. Steinberg	
2021	The In-Between		Yes			
2021	Cupid for Christmas	Yes	Yes			
2021	Hit	Yes				
2023	Pretty Stoned			Yes		
2024	Miss Valentine	Yes	Yes			

== Awards ==
Film	Year	Award	Event	Ref
Weather Girl	2009	Screenplay: Narrative Feature	DeadCENTER Film Festival	
6 Month Rule	2012	Best Feature Film	Hill Country Film Festival	
6 Month Rule	2012	Best Actor	Hill Country Film Festival	
6 Month Rule	2012	Official Selection for Narrative Feature Film	Hill Country Film Festival	
Cut to the Chase	2016	Best Director of a Feature	Northeast Film Festival	
Cut to the Chase	2016	Best Actor in a Feature	Northeast Film Festival	
Cut to the Chase	2016	Best Director	Hill Country Film Festival	
Cut to the Chase	2016	Official Selection for Narrative Feature Film	Hill Country Film Festival	
Cut to the Chase	2016	Best Director	Philadelphia Independent Film Festival	
Ghosted	2019	Top 20 Films and Filmmakers	Louisiana Film Prize	
Ghosted	2019	Top 5	Louisiana Film Prize	
Hit	2021	Top 20 Films and Filmmakers	Louisiana Film Prize	
Chronofilm: The Web Series	2025	Best Ensemble	Vegas Movie Awards	
