= Scott Cross (film director) =

American film producer

- Born: Cape Town, South Africa
- Occupations: film director, producer, actor, writer, and co-founder Vail Film Festival and Los Cabos International Film Festival

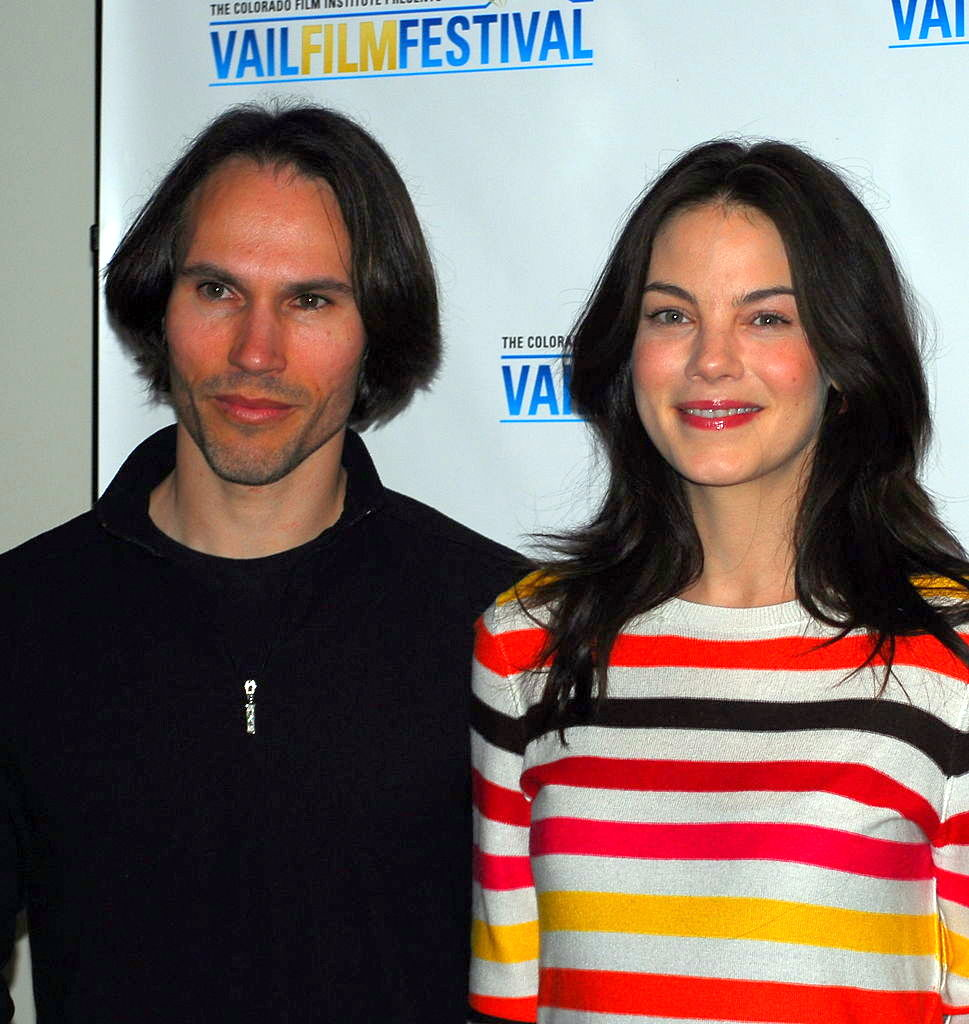
Scott Cross and Michelle Monaghan

Scott Cross is an American producer, actor, writer, and entrepreneur. He is co-founder of the Vail Film Festival in Vail, Colorado, co-founder of the Los Cabos International Film Festival in Los Cabos, Mexico, and co-president of Cross Pictures, a film and television production company. The Vail Film Festival has been named "one of the top ten destination film festivals in the world," according to MovieMaker magazine.

== Background ==
Cross was born in Cape Town, South Africa and raised in New York, United States. He graduated from the University of California at Berkeley with a Bachelor of Arts in Social Anthropology. He resides in Los Angeles, California.

== Career ==
In 2004, Cross co-founded the Colorado Film Institute and the Vail Film Festival. In 2005, Cross helped bring LA's acclaimed Hotel Café to the Vail Film Festival, a partnership that continues to this day.

In 2006, Cross helped secure the Vail Film Festival partnership with Film Your Issue, a national issue film contest, in partnership with the American Democracy Project, featuring 30 to 60-second films. In 2007, Cross initiated and oversaw a partnership between the Vail Film Festival and Product Red. Together, Product Red and the Vail Film Festival launched the RED Vision Contest, a worldwide film competition created by Cross .

By 2007 Cross and his brother Sean Cross had grown the Vail Film Festival to become one of the top ten destination film festivals in the world, according to MovieMaker Magazine.

In 2012, Cross co-founded the Cabo International Film Festival (Originally named Baja International Film Festival). The inaugural edition took place in Los Cabos, Mexico November 14–17, 2012 with Edward Norton as the official festival adviser.
