= Birthday Wish =

A birthday wish is a tradition in some cultures accompanying blowing out candles on a birthday cake.

Birthday Wish or Birthday Wishes may refer to:

== Film ==
- Birthday Wish, a 2010 Taiwanese film starring Wang Po-chieh
- The Birthday Wish, a 2017 Hallmark Channel Original Movie
- Birthday Wishes (film), a 2023 Czech film

== Literature ==
- "A Birthday Wish", an 1892 poem by Louisa Lawson
- A Birthday Wish, a 1977 book by Ed Emberley
- The Birthday Wish, a book in the Barbie Dreamtopia franchise

== Songs ==
- "Birthday Wish" (song), a 2026 single by Nmixx
- "Birthday Wishes", from the 2010 The Camerawalls album Bread and Circuses
- "Birthday Wish", from the 2016 Greg Laswell album Everyone Thinks I Dodged a Bullet
- "Birthday Wish", a 2020 single by Lyta

== Television ==
- "Birthday Wishes", a 2004 episode of Weebl and Bob
- "Birthday Wish!", a 2005 episode of The Fairly OddParents
- "Birthday Wishes", a 2005 episode of Pleasant Goat and Big Big Wolf
- "A Birthday Wish", a 2017 episode of Good Witch
- "Birthday Wish", a 2017 episode of The Promise of Forever
- "The Birthday Wish", a 2018 episode of Sofia the First
- "Birthday Wish", a 2019 episode of Kadenang Ginto
- "Birthday Wish", a 2022 episode of Start-Up PH
- "Birthday Wish", a 2023 episode of Unbreak my Heart
- "Birthday Wishes", a 2023 episode of Love is Blind
