= Patrick J. Adams =

Canadian and American actor (born 1981)

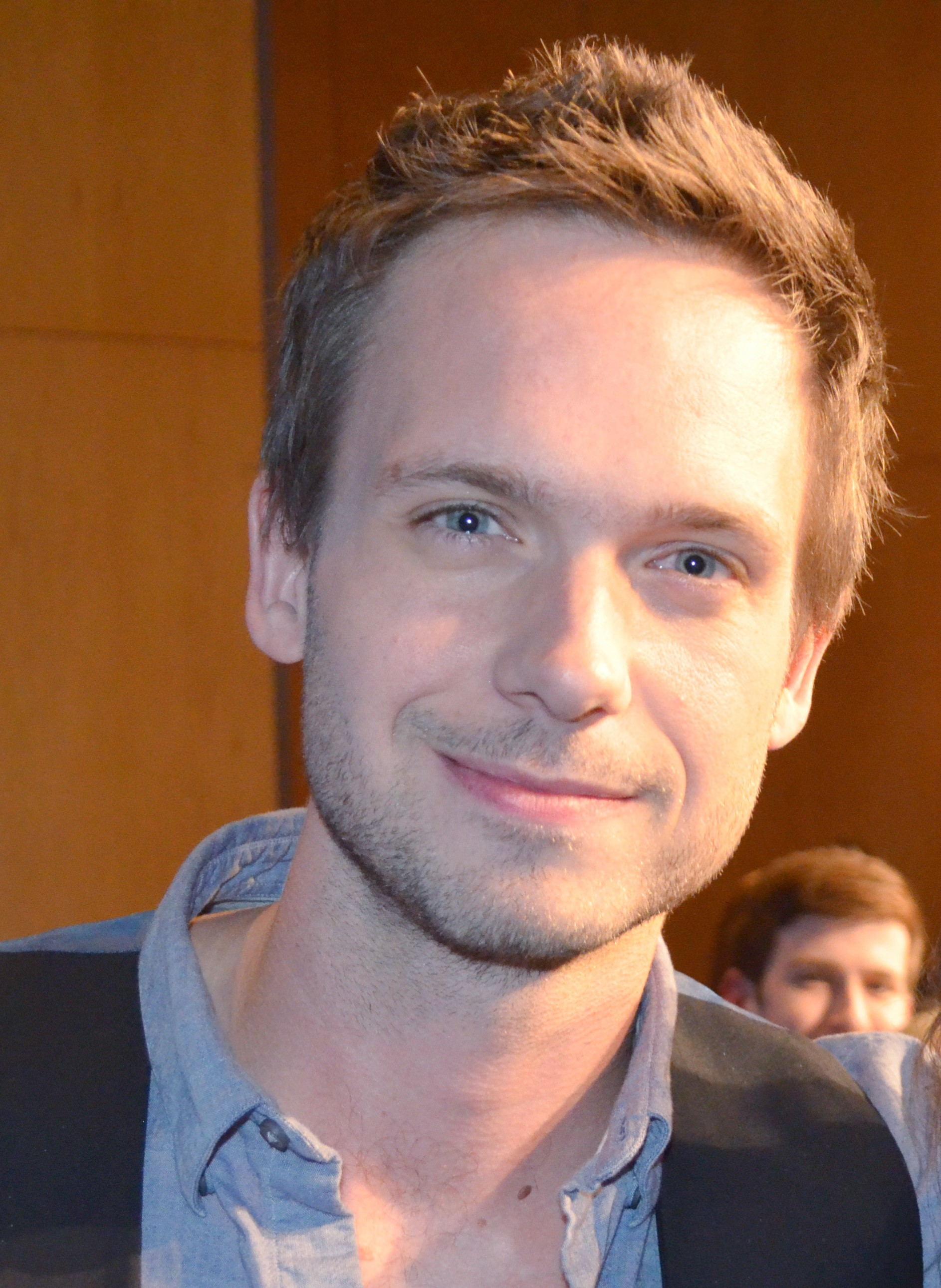
- Adams in 2013
- Born: Patrick Johannes Adams; August 27, 1981 (age 45); Toronto, Ontario, Canada
- Education: University of Southern California; (BFA)
- Occupation: Actor
- Years active: 2001–present
- Spouse: Troian Bellisario (m. 2016)
- Children: 3
- Website: https://www.patrick-j-adams.com/

Patrick Johannes Adams (born August 27, 1981) is a Canadian-American actor. He is best known for his role as Mike Ross, a college dropout turned unlicensed lawyer, in the USA Network legal drama series Suits (2011–2019). His performance earned him a nomination in 2012 for the Screen Actors Guild Award for Outstanding Performance by a Male Actor in a Drama Series.

== Early life and education ==
Patrick Johannes Adams was born in Toronto, Ontario, to Rowan Marsh & Claude Adams, a journalist. He attended Northern Secondary School.

Following his parents' divorce, Adams moved from Toronto to Los Angeles at age 19, where he attended the University of Southern California, earning a Bachelor of Fine Arts. After earning the Jack Nicholson Award in 2004, which provided scholarships directly funded by the eponymous actor to outstanding performers at the school, and earning his BFA, he immediately began working on a production of Edward Albee's The Goat, or Who Is Sylvia? at the Mark Taper Forum.

== Career ==
=== Television ===
Adams appeared in episodes of Cold Case, Pretty Little Liars, Jack & Bobby, and has since had roles in Lost, Friday Night Lights, Without a Trace, Commander in Chief, Heartland, Ghost Whisperer, NCIS, Cupid, Luck, Raising the Bar, Legends of Tomorrow, Lie to Me and Suits. He starred as twin brothers in the 2008 ABC pilot Good Behavior, executive produced by Rob Thomas. In 2009, he signed for the male lead in the one-hour drama The Dealership, starring opposite Tricia Helfer and William Devane. His television appearances grew over the next few years, from guest appearances on Numb3rs to a recurring role as a love interest for Adrianne Palicki on Friday Night Lights and leads in TV features like the romantic comedy Christmas in Boston.

In 2007, he moved up to guest appearances on top-rated shows like Lost, where he played a young man who sought out John Locke (played by Terry O'Quinn). He also maintained his presence in the Los Angeles theater scene, most notably with an award-winning production of "Marat/Sade," which he produced and directed for the Blue House Theatre Company. In 2010, Adams guest starred in Pretty Little Liars, in the 5th episode: "Reality Bites Me", as Ezra Fitz's college friend, Hardy.

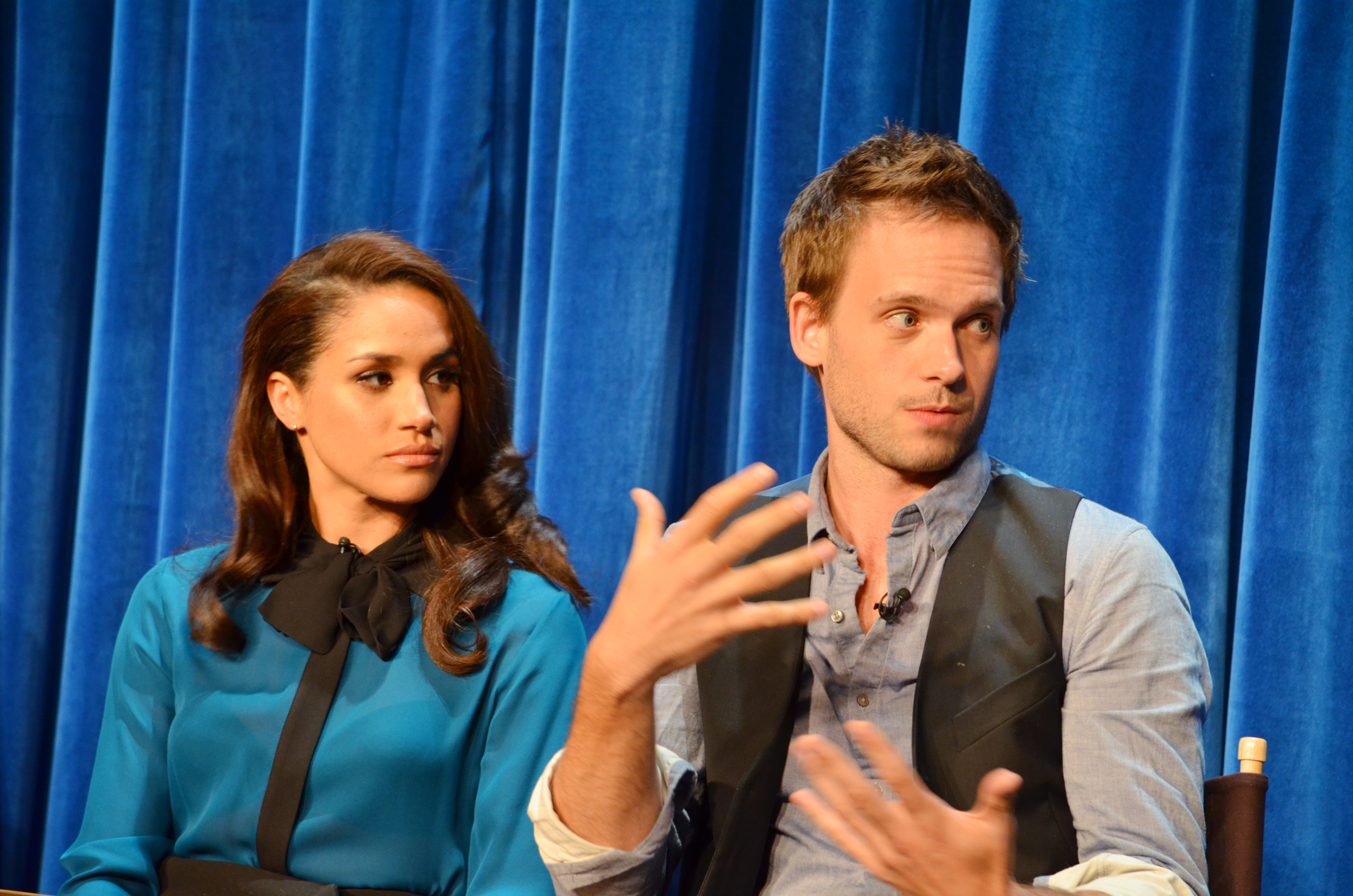
Adams with Suits co-star Meghan Markle, 2013

In mid-2011, he began starring in the co-lead role of Mike Ross in Suits on the basic-cable USA Network, after being fired from the pilot of NBC's Friends with Benefits.

He garnered much acclaim for his role in the series, which continued through its seventh season in 2017–18. Beginning in season 3, Adams was listed as a co-producer of Suits (with co-star Gabriel Macht), and directed some episodes. On January 30, 2018, it was announced Adams was departing from the show following the completion of its seventh season. He appeared in HBO's 2012 TV series Luck as recurring character Nathan Israel.

In 2016, Adams was cast as Hourman in the TV series Legends of Tomorrow. Playing the Rex Tyler iteration, he appeared at the end of the season 1 finale before being killed off in the season 2 premiere.

In 2020, he was cast in the role of legendary astronaut John Glenn for the Disney+ series The Right Stuff.

In 2024, Adams was added to the cast of The Madison.

=== Film ===
Adams's work in film includes supporting roles in Old School and Two: Thirteen, and lead roles in Weather Girl (a 2009 Slamdance entry) and the 2009 Berlin International Film Festival competitor Rage, directed by Sally Potter. In the beginning of 2018 he released his own first short film, We Are Here. He wrote, directed, and acted in the short film together with his wife Troian Bellisario.

=== Theatre ===
Adams made his Broadway debut in the Second Stage Theater revival of Take Me Out, which was originally slated to open at the Hayes Theater in April 2020. But due to the COVID-19 pandemic, the show was postponed for two years; previews began on March 10, 2022, with the show officially opening on April 4, 2022. For his role in the play as Christopher "Kippy" Sunderstrom, Adams received a nomination from the Outer Critics Circle Awards for Outstanding Actor in a Play. Take Me Out won the Tony Award for Best Revival of a Play.

== Personal life ==
Adams married Troian Bellisario (star of Pretty Little Liars) on December 10, 2016, in Santa Barbara, California. The two met in 2009 when they were cast opposite each other in the play Equivocation, then broke up briefly but got back together after Adams' guest appearance on Pretty Little Liars in 2010. They have three daughters, Aurora (born 2018), Elliot (born 2021) and Imogen (born 2026). In an episode of the podcast Katie's Crib hosted by actress Katie Lowes, Adams and Bellisario said their second child was born in their car in the hospital's parking lot due to accelerated labour. Hospital staff quickly assisted them within minutes of the delivery. Adams is a naturalized citizen of the United States.

Adams was awarded Honorary Life Membership of University College Dublin Law Society in September 2013.

He plays the guitar and is an avid photographer who owns more than 25 cameras. His photos were featured in Suits' Behind the Lens and #PJAGallery exhibitions.

== Filmography ==
=== Film ===
Year	Title	Role	Notes
2001	For the Record	Patrick	Short film
2003	Old School	Patch	
2005	Christmas in Boston	Seth	
2007	Walk Hard: The Dewey Cox Story	The Kid	Uncredited
2008	The Butcher's Daughter	Ellis McArthur	Short film
2008	3 Days Gone	Doug Cross	Short film
2008	Extreme Movie	Male voice	
2009	2:13	Carter Pullman at 19	
2009	Weather Girl	Byron	
2009	Rage	Dwight Angel	
2009	The Waterhole	Miller	
2011	6 Month Rule	Julian	
2012	The Come Up	Steve	Short film
2015	Ruthless	Calvin Cartwright	Short
2017	Car Dogs	Mark Chamberlain	
2017	Room for Rent	Huey Dorsey	
2018	We Are Here	Unnamed Man	Short film; writer and director
2018	Clara	Isaac Bruno	
2022	The Swearing Jar	Simon	
2023	He Went That Way	Saul	
2024	Happy Birthday	Sam	Short
2024	Young Werther	Albert	

=== Television ===
Year	Title	Role	Notes	Refs.
2004	Jack & Bobby	Matt Kramer	Episode: "Lost Boys"	
2004	Cold Case	Dean Lang 1953	Episode: "Red Glare"	
2004	Strong Medicine	Brandon	Episode: "Code"	
2005	Close to Home	Paul the Paralegal	Episode: "Under Threat"	
2005	Christmas in Boston	Seth	TV movie	
2006	Orpheus	Barry	TV movie	
2006	Numbers	Adam Bennett	Episode: "Protest"	
2006	Commander in Chief	Colin James	2 episodes	
2006–2007	Friday Night Lights	Connor Hayes	2 episodes	
2007	Without a Trace	Adam Clark	Episode: "Primed"	
2007	Lost	Peter Talbot	Episode: "The Man From Tallahassee"	
2007	Heartland	Henry Gilliam	Episode: "I Make Myself Into Something New"	
2008	Good Behavior	Van/Haden West	TV movie	
2008	NCIS	Tommy Doyle	Episode: "Murder 2.0"	
2009	The Dealership	Jack Carson	TV movie	
2009	Ghost Whisperer	Linus Van Horn	Episode: "Ghost Busted"	
2009	Cupid	Joe Adams	Episode: "Shipping Out"	
2009	Lie to Me	Lou Nemeroff	Episode: Control Factor	
2009	Raising the Bar	James Parsons	Episode: "Oh, Say You Can Pee"	
2010	FlashForward	Ed	Episode: "Future Shock"	
2010	Pretty Little Liars	Hardy	Episode: "Reality Bites Me"	
2011–2012	Luck	Nathan Israel	4 episodes	
2011–2019	Suits	Mike Ross	Main role (seasons 1–7); Guest star (season 9 "If the Shoe Fits", "Thunder Away", "One Last Con"); 111 episodes	
2014	Rosemary's Baby	Guy Woodhouse	Miniseries, 2 episodes	
2014–2015	Orphan Black	Jesse	2 episodes	
2015	Talking Marriage with Ryan Bailey	Himself	1 episode	
2016	Legends of Tomorrow	Rex Tyler / Hourman	2 episodes	
2017	Pillow Talk	Ryan	14 episodes	
2018	America 2.0	Seth McGuire	6 episodes	
2019	Sneaky Pete	Stefan Kilbane	Season 3	
2020	The Right Stuff	John Glenn	Season 1	
2021	Pandemica		7 episodes	
2022	A League of Their Own	Charlie	Recurring role	
2023	Ad Lucem	Peter	Episode: "The Party"	
2023	America 2.0	Seth McGuire	Podcast series	
2023	Plan B	Philip Grimmer	6 episodes	
2024	Accused	Pete Vanderkamp	Episode: "Marcus' Story"	
2025	The Bombing of Pan Am 103	Dick Marquise	6 episodes	
2025	Wayward	Mr. Wyatt Turner	Miniseries, 2 episodes	
2026	The Madison	Russell McIntosh	6 episodes	
