= Weather Girl =

- Promotional film poster
- Directed by: Blayne Weaver
- Written by: Blayne Weaver
- Produced by: Tricia O'Kelley
- Starring: Tricia O'Kelley; Mark Harmon; Jon Cryer; Patrick J. Adams; Enrico Colantoni; Marin Hinkle
- Cinematography: Brandon Trost
- Edited by: Abe Levy
- Music by: Andrew Hollander
- Production companies: Secret Identity Productions; Steakhaus Productions
- Distributed by: Secret Identity Productions
- Release dates: January 17, 2009 (Sundance); July 10, 2009 (United States)
- Running time: 92 minutes
- Country: United States
- Language: English
- Box office: $22,779 (US)

Weather Girl is a 2009 American comedy film written and directed by Blayne Weaver and starring Tricia O'Kelley, Mark Harmon, Jon Cryer, and Enrico Colantoni.

After a morning show personality discovers her boyfriend's infidelity, she loses it on-air, costing her her job and forcing her to move in with her younger brother. She must cope with being 35, single and working for minimum wage and has an unlikely romance with a younger man.

== Plot ==
Sylvia Miller, a Seattle morning show weather television personality, after learning her boyfriend Dale Waters and anchor for their show has cheated on her with his co-anchor Sherry, shames him on air. Her live freak out includes quitting her job.

Sylvia is forced to move in with her younger brother, as she was living with Dale. She must cope with being 35, single and unemployable in her chosen profession as she's committed professional suicide.

To retrieve her things from her old place she gets Byron and Walt, who are a number of years younger, to act as her muscle. Dale and Sherry are napping when they arrive, and when she finds them she loses it, climbing on the bed and slapping him. Before she goes, Dale says he cheated because she didn't love him and she was cold.

After several unsuccessful job interviews it becomes clear that Sylvia can't get hired in broadcast journalism. Now desperate to earn money, she eventually gets a low-paying job as a waitress.

That night, Sylvia agrees to go on a date with Charles, set up by her girlfriends. Walt and Byron give them a hard time as the couple leaves the apartment. On the date, Charles comes on very strong, talking about wanting to get married, and even having chosen the names of their future children.

Arriving back at the apartment, Sylvia tells Byron that Charles was creepy. He proposes he be her rebound guy. Initially resistant, after a moment she says yes. The conditions are: it's just physical; no strings; and don't tell Walt.

The fling is the only thing making Sylvia's life tolerable. But the secret is out when Walt walks in on the two as they are getting physical. Byron fears what this discovery may do to his friendship with Walt, but Sylvia insists that it is purely physical, with no strings.

Restaurant customers constantly bug Sylvia about her TV blow up and the kitchen staff harass her in Spanish. She begins to bond with the staff when she finally shows them she knows some Spanish. Byron shows up at the restaurant, coercing her into a date, where they walk, share life stories, and seem to get closer.

On the walk, Sylvia tells Byron that her mom died when she was 14, and Walt was 10, so the siblings raised each other. They bump into her friends, whom she hasn't seen since she and Byron started hooking up. The friends bring up the age difference.

At work, Sylvia performs the Heimlich maneuver on a choking customer, a video of which goes viral. Simultaneously, Walt notices that Byron is truly interested in her as her former boss calls, proposing she come back to co-anchor with Dale.

As Sylvia considers the new job offer, Dale invites her to dinner, and says she can decide if it is just a professional meeting or also intimate. Walt admonishes her for going. Byron stops by to let her know how much he likes her, but Sylvia says she doesn't reciprocate. At the dinner, Dale says he wants her back, but she doesn't allow him to kiss her.

Just minutes before Sylvia goes on the air again, Walt appears and asks her not to be a sellout. On live TV, she reiterates that Dale is a prick, that she is not going to sell out after all, and thanks her brother for helping bring her to her senses.

In the dressing room, Byron is waiting for Sylvia. They both declare their love and kiss.

== Cast ==
- Tricia O'Kelley as Sylvia Miller
- Patrick J. Adams as Byron
- Ryan Devlin as Walt
- Mark Harmon as Dale Waters
- Jon Cryer as Charles
- Enrico Colantoni as George
- Amie Donegan as Mary
- Timothy Dvorak as Jack
- Kaitlin Olson as Sherry
- Alex Kapp Horner as Emily
- Marin Hinkle as Jane
- Lucas Fleischer as Arthur
- Bubba Lewis as Irving
- Jane Lynch as J.D.

Five actors from Two and a Half Men are in the cast. Two actors from It's Always Sunny in Philadelphia are also in the cast, as well as two more from Brothers & Sisters.

== Filming locations ==
- Los Angeles, California, United States
- Seattle, Washington, United States

== Reception ==
Weather Girl received mixed to mostly negative reviews and a critic rating of 33% on Rotten Tomatoes, based on 9 reviews. Metacritic, which uses a weighted average, assigned the film a score of 47 out of 100, based on 4 critics, indicating "mixed or average" reviews.
