= 6 Month Rule =

2011 film by Blayne Weaver

- Directed by: Blayne Weaver
- Written by: Blayne Weaver
- Starring: Blayne Weaver; Martin Starr; Natalie Morales
- Cinematography: Daniel Stoloff
- Edited by: Abe Levy
- Music by: Andrew Hollander
- Production companies: Secret Identity Productions; Steakhaus Productions
- Distributed by: Abramorama; Secret Identity Pictures
- Release date: October 21, 2011 (Austin Film Festival premiere)
- Running time: 100 minutes
- Country: United States
- Language: English
- Budget: $796K
- Box office: $14,057

6 Month Rule is a 2011 comedy film starring Martin Starr and Blayne Weaver. Directed and written by Blayne Weaver, it stars Blayne Weaver, Martin Starr and Natalie Morales. The film follows "a womanizer and commitment-phobe" who tries to teach his best friend, a serial monogamist, the art of being single and how to avoid heartbreak. It was theatrically released on October 21, 2011, at the Austin Film Festival.

== Plot ==
Tyler is a photographer who divides his time between his work and women. Although he has published a book of his artistic work, he pays the bills with advertising photos. While at the local bookstore checking if copies of his books were sold, Tyler strikes up a conversation with a woman looking through his book. Their conversation is cut short when he has an altercation with someone else in the shop.

Tyler has a brief interlude with Wendy, who comments that they've been occasionally hooking up for nearly two years. He reminds her that 'The Rules' prevent him from staying the night. Alan, Tyler's oldest friend, calls hoping to commiserate about the failure of his three-year relationship with Claire. Tyler reminds him of the rule that friendship is the only thing that lasts. He scolds Alan for not recovering the engagement ring and insists he stay on his sofa.

They go to Claire's to get Alan's things. Back at his place, Tyler explains he is fading a girl, occasionally contacting her at longer and longer intervals as no one owes explanations unless they are in a committed relationship. Tyler's agent, Paul, calls him to meet the musician who wants publicity pictures. It turns out to be at a gallery where the girl from the bookstore, Sophie, is hanging her paintings for an exhibition. Julian appears, gushing over Sophie's paintings and Tyler's photos. He breezes through, enthusiastic about their collaboration, and refers to Sophie as his girlfriend. Although crestfallen, Tyler decides to drag Alan along to a party Julian invites him to.

Tyler confesses his feelings for Sophie to Alan, then talks about "the girl you date versus the perfect girl"; the former makes you at ease but dissatisfied, and the latter makes you nervous, unsure, and at risk of destruction. Getting Sophie alone, Tyler accuses her of playing it safe by being with Julian, claiming he'll never understand her. When she says they aren't a couple, they kiss. However, when he suggests they leave together, she refuses to hurt Julian.

Back at the party, Tyler reunites with a model through his agent. In front of Sophie, he suggests they go home together, but once there can't perform. He bursts into Alan's apartment, ranting about screwing up with Sophie, waking Alan. Alan advises him to confess his feelings for her.

At her studio, against her better judgement, Sophie accepts Tyler's apology. They spend three days in her apartment where they connect both physically and intellectually.

Tyler has the photo shoot the next day with Julian. He arranges a double date so Alan can hook up that evening. Before it can happen, Julian tells Tyler he's going to try to win Sophie back from whoever she's been seeing, not knowing it's Tyler. Tyler follows him to her place, and he takes her call saying she'll be late, tortured that she's invited Julian in. By the time Sophie arrives at their date, Tyler is in a jealous frenzy. He accuses her of sleeping with Julian, so she breaks it off with him. When he turns to Alan for sympathy, he won't support him. He goes to Wendy who also snubs him since she is secretly in love with him.

Six months pass and Tyler finally visits Alan in his new place and is surprised to see Wendy. She tells him Julian is back in town and performing that night. When Tyler goes to talk with Sophie, Julian sees him. Though initially pleased to see Tyler, when Tyler tells him he was "the other guy", Julian jumps him and has him thrown out. Sophie follows him out, Tyler declares his love, and they share one last kiss; she may not be in love with Julian, but Tyler is too much of a risk. Tyler and Alan meet up and go to the bar. Tyler's outlook on relationships has changed.

== Cast ==
- Blayne Weaver as Tyler
- Martin Starr as Alan
- Natalie Morales as Sophie
- John Michael Higgins as Paul, Tyler's agent
- Jaime Pressly as Claire
- Vanessa Branch as Wendy
- Patrick J. Adams as Julian

== Reception ==
Variety said, "Script stumbles a bit, though, in a last stretch that caves in to sentimental genre conventions before halfheartedly ending on a semi-sober note." Slant Magazine rated it 2 out of 5 stars. Review aggregation website Rotten Tomatoes gave the film a rating of 22% by critics based on 9 reviews.
