= Manic (2001 film) =

2001 American drama film by Jordan Melamed

- Theatrical release poster
- Directed by: Jordan Melamed
- Written by: Michael Bacall; Blayne Weaver
- Produced by: Trudi Callon; Kirk Hassig
- Starring: Joseph Gordon-Levitt; Zooey Deschanel; Michael Bacall; Don Cheadle
- Cinematography: Nicholas Hay
- Edited by: Madeleine Gavin; Gloria Rosa Vela
- Music by: Michael Linnen; David Wingo
- Production company: Next Wave Films
- Distributed by: IFC Films
- Release dates: January 27, 2001 (Sundance); May 23, 2003
- Running time: 102 minutes
- Country: United States
- Language: English
- Budget: $400,000
- Box office: $69,958

Manic is a 2001 American drama film directed by Jordan Melamed and written by Michael Bacall and Blayne Weaver. It was shown at several film festivals in 2001 and 2002, including the Sundance Film Festival. The region 1 DVD was released January 20, 2004. The film marked the first time actors Joseph Gordon-Levitt and Zooey Deschanel played love interests in a film; they later reunited in (500) Days of Summer.

== Plot ==
After brutally beating another teen with a baseball bat during a baseball game, Lyle Jensen, an impulsive and aggressive teen, is admitted to the juvenile psychiatric ward of a hospital along with other troubled teens: Tracy, Chad, Michael, Kenny and Sara. Lyle is placed in a room with Kenny, a reticent 12-year-old, and they form some semblance of a sibling relationship. Lyle has problems adjusting to the confinements of the institution and it is Dr. David Monroe's job to get them to talk in group therapy sessions.

Lyle finds himself attracted to Tracy. She is reluctant to become close to him due to her low self-esteem. Tracy has constant terrible nightmares. Lyle becomes curious about why she screams at night and later finds out she is a rape survivor. In their room, Kenny and Lyle begin a discussion about their fathers, at which point Kenny announces that his stepfather is going to visit him. After a disastrous visit, it is revealed that the stepfather sexually abuses him. Following a confrontation between Dr. Monroe, Kenny and his stepfather, Kenny is transferred to another unit of the institution.

A group meeting takes place in which the patients and Dr. Monroe discuss their worries about the situation with Kenny. Michael, a violent sociopath, feels no empathy for Kenny and states that he got what he deserved. At this point, Lyle jumps up and attacks Michael, but the guards pull them apart. Dr. Monroe becomes upset at Lyle and begins throwing chairs around the room, demonstrating to Lyle that reacting out of anger accomplishes nothing. The two later have a conversation in which the doctor apologizes.

During his stay, Lyle forms a friendship with Chad, who has bipolar disorder and agoraphobia. The two make plans to go to Amsterdam with the money from Chad's trust fund. Later, Chad and Sara have an argument over Van Gogh's painting Wheat Field with Crows; Sara states that the painting represents freedom, while Chad states that the painting represents depression and confinement. Sara is soon released and departs from the psychiatric ward, leaving Tracy heartbroken. After Chad's eighteenth birthday, he backs out of the plan to go to Amsterdam stating that running off to another place will not change his life. However, he encourages Lyle to go ahead without him. The day before his release, Chad cuts himself while reading The Myth of Sisyphus. When discovered, he attacks one of the guards and cuts the guard's neck, causing him to be removed from the ward. During the scuffle between Chad and the guard, the guard drops his keys, which Lyle takes without notice. That night, Lyle uses the keys to get into Tracy's room. He apologizes and the two embrace and kiss.

The day of his escape, Lyle searches for Tracy. Unable to find her, he asks Michael of her whereabouts. Michael inquires if Lyle has raped Tracy yet since "she wants it." This enrages Lyle, and moments later he breaks into Michael's room and attacks him, leaving him lying bloody in a corner. When he leaves Michael's room, he sees Tracy and tells her that he was looking for her. She says and does nothing as he unlocks the door of the institution and runs out the gate. Lyle leaves the institution and makes his way to a bus stop. He waits at the bus terminal and when it pulls up, there is a poster of the Van Gogh painting on the side of it. Seeing the painting, Lyle is reminded of the argument between Chad and Sara. Lyle does not board the bus and instead walks back to the institution.

== Cast ==
- Joseph Gordon-Levitt as Lyle Jensen
- Zooey Deschanel as Tracy
- Michael Bacall as Chad
- Don Cheadle as Dr. David Monroe
- Cody Lightning as Kenny
- Elden Henson as Michael
- Sara Rivas as Sara

== Reception ==
Manic received positive reviews upon release, on Rotten Tomatoes the film has an acceptance score of 68% with an average score of 6.30/10 based on 62 reviews, the critical consensus reads "A grim drama about emotionally damaged teens, Manic's solid cast helps to elevate the material above cliche." On Metacritic the film has a score of 60% based on 20 reviews indicating "Mixed or Average reviews."

== Music ==
The film features music by Thurston Moore, Aphex Twin, Deftones, Squarepusher, Broadcast, and Sleater-Kinney.
