= Jack the Radio =

American indie rock band

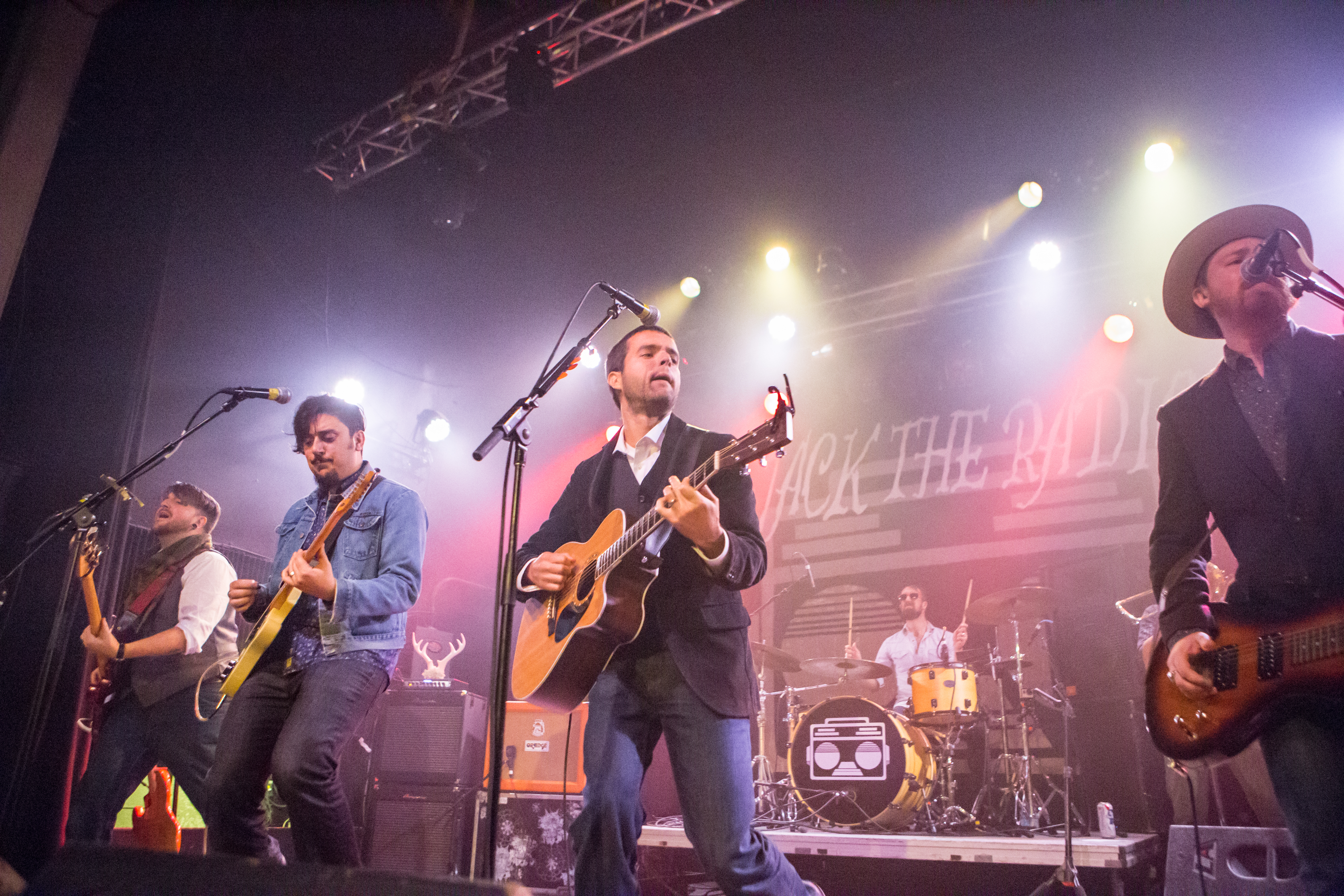
- Jack the Radio in concert, Raleigh, NC, October 2015

Background information
- Origin: Raleigh, North Carolina, United States
- Genres: Indie rock, roots rock, blues rock, country rock, psychedelic rock
- Years active: 2005–present
- Label: Pretty Money
- Members: George Hage; Danny Johnson; Dan Grinder; Kevin Rader
- Website: www.jacktheradio.com

Jack the Radio is an indie roots rock band based in Raleigh, North Carolina.

In addition to gaining a strong regional following, the band has had success placing its music on TV shows both nationally and internationally. The band's singer, George Hage, has also been drawn into a Marvel Comic. The band's album, Badlands inspired the creation of a craft beer, Badlands Black Rye IPA, released in October 2015 by the North Carolina–based Mystery Brewing Company. Since then, the band has released another album-related collaboration beer with Trophy Brewing Company of Raleigh, NC.

Jack the Radio was founded by Hage and A.C. Hill in 2005 when they were roommates at North Carolina State University. They wrote songs together in their dorm rooms and recorded a self-titled EP.

The band added new members in 2009 and released their first full-length album, Pretty Money, in 2011. The band's second album, Lowcountry, came out in 2012. In 2014, the band won the regional competition known as Last Band Standing.

In 2015, Jack the Radio released its third studio album, Badlands. It features special appearances by Elizabeth Hopkins of Delta Rae and BJ Barham of American Aquarium. The online music site The Vinyl District called Badlands "a powerful mix of swampy, country rock and soaring, indie sensibilities," while the regional publication Indy Week praised it as "one of the finest big-time rock records to come from the area in recent years."

Five years later the band returned with a new lineup (Hage and longtime member Danny Johnson on guitar, vocals and keys, Dan Grinder on bass and Devin Rader on drums and vocals) and released Creatures (2020). The album is paired with a comic book of the same name written by Hage and featuring the eponymous Jack, "a skeleton figure dressed in classic cowboy garb. As the visual story unfolds, it takes viewers through all manner of settings, initially realistic but gradually unraveling to all manner of colorful, fantastical, and at times psychedelic in scope." In 2023, the band released the song "This World" as a tie-in with the I Hate Fairyland graphic novel Gert's Inferno. The band released another album, Under Lonely Light, in 2024, paired with another comic book. According to the band members, the pandemic shaped the album's more introspective lyrics and changed their recording process, with the band recording some parts remotely and Johnson mixing the album in his home studio. "Under Lonely Light keeps Jack the Radio’s folksy sensibilities, but layers in slick synth and guitar effects."

== Discography ==
=== Albums ===
- Pretty Money (2011)
- Lowcountry (2012)
- Live at Amplified Art / Devil in Here (2013)
- Badlands (2015)
- Creatures (2020)
- Under Lonely Light (2024)

== In other media ==
=== Television ===
- "Carolina Mud" – HBO, Boardwalk Empire, Season 2 recap; USA Networks, Graceland, Season 2 Episode 8
- "Pretty Money" – USA Networks, Necessary Roughness, Season 3 Episode 9
- "Truck Stop Man" – Discovery Channel, Gator Boys, Season 2 commercial
- "Just What I Need" - Resident Alien, Season 3 Episode 1
- “Wild West Woman” - NASCAR: Full Speed, Episode 1
- “City Slippin” - NASCAR: Full Speed, Episode 5

=== Film ===
- "Downstream" – Where We're Meant to Be (2016)
- "Pretty Money" - Dandelion (2024)
- "Elevator" - Dandelion (2024)

=== Commercials ===
- Focus Home Interactive – video game trailer (2013)
- Squarespace – 60-second commercial (2013)
- Weber Grill Seasoning – 60-second commercial (2014)
- Kraftig Beer – 30-second commercial (2014)

=== Comics ===
- "This World" – I Hate Fairyland: Gert's Inferno (2023)
