= Three Flights from Alto Nido =

Studio album by Greg Laswell
- Released: July 8, 2008
- Recorded: Dog's Bark Studio, Santa Ana; Greg's studio, San Diego
- Genre: Indie rock
- Length: 42:05
- Label: Vanguard
- Producer: Greg Laswell

Greg Laswell chronology
Through Toledo (2006)	Three Flights from Alto Nido (2008)	Take a Bow (2010)

Professional ratings
Review scores
Source	Rating
Allmusic	(not rated)
The Music Box	1.5/5 stars
PopMatters	(5/10)
Popwreckoning	(positive)

Three Flights from Alto Nido is the third studio album by San Diego, California-based singer-songwriter Greg Laswell. It was released through Vanguard Records on July 8, 2008. The song "Comes and Goes (In Waves)" was featured in the promotional trailer and soundtrack for the HBO film Taking Chance in early 2009, as well as an episode of True Blood in October 2008. "How the Day Sounds" featured in an episode of 90210, "Sweet Dream" featured in an episode of Dollhouse and "And Then You" featured in an episode of Grey's Anatomy in September 2008.

== Track listing ==
All songs written by Greg Laswell.

1. "That It Moves" – 3:54
2. "The One I Love" – 2:35
3. "It's Been a Year" – 3:12
4. "Comes and Goes (In Waves)" – 4:13
5. "How the Day Sounds" – 4:49
6. "Sweet Dream" – 1:07
7. "Days Go On" – 3:15
8. "I'd Be Lying" – 4:45
9. "Farewell" – 3:56
10. "And Then You" – 3:29
11. "Not Out" – 3:32

Bonus track

12. "That It Moves" (GarageBand Demo) – 3:18

== Credits ==
- All songs written, recorded, and performed by Greg Laswell
- Recorded at Dog's Bark Studio in Santa Ana, California, except "How the Day Sounds" and "Days Go On" recorded in Greg's studio in San Diego
- Greg Laswell – vocals, piano, acoustic guitar, electric guitar, harmonium, bass, melotron, bells, and organ
- Brandon Walters – acoustic guitars, electric guitars, banjo
- Molly Jenson – vocals on "Comes and Goes (In Waves)" and "Farewell"
- Alec Little – upright bass (on "The One I Love"), electric bass (on "That It Moves," "Comes and Goes (In Waves)," and "I'd Be Lying")
