= Good Movie (Greg Lawsell album) =

Studio album by Greg Laswell
- Released: December 8, 2003
- Recorded: 2001–2003
- Genre: Singer-songwriter
- Length: 52:48
- Label: All the Rest Records
- Producer: Greg Laswell

Greg Laswell chronology
Good Movie (2003)	Through Toledo (2006)

Good Movie is San Diego, California-based singer-songwriter Greg Laswell's debut release. The album was his first release following the dissolution of his band Shillglen in late 2001. Good Movie won a San Diego Music Award for Best Local Recording in 2004. It was released on All the Rest Records, a now-defunct label owned and operated by Laswell before he founded his current label, 20 Inch Records.

== Track listing ==
All songs written by Greg Laswell.

1. "Bright Ideas" – 5:59
2. "Back to June" – 3:44
3. "Carry Me Through" – 4:38
4. "Tirade" – 3:53
5. "19" Life" – 4:40
6. "7:00 AM" – 0:44
7. "Good Movie" – 4:53
8. "Head for Today" – 5:21
9. "Father of Your Billies" – 4:09
10. "Circle Around Again" – 4:03
11. "You So Bright" – 4:24
12. "New Day" – 5:58
13. "Me First" – 4:33
