= Greg Laswell =

American musician (b. 1974)

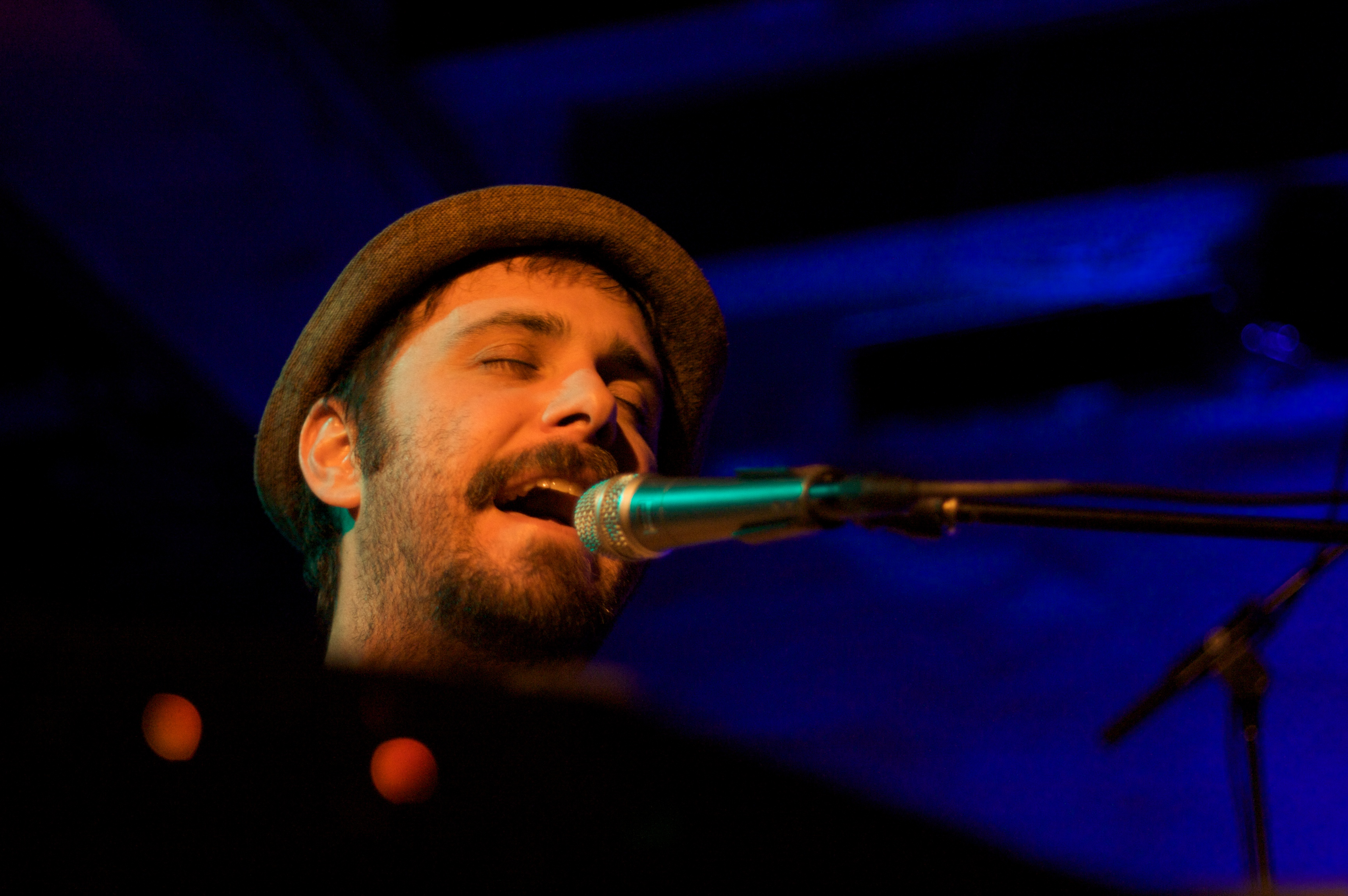
- Laswell in September 2008

Background information
- Born: April 26, 1974 (age 52); Long Beach, California, U.S.
- Origin: San Diego, California, U.S.
- Genres: Indie rock; folk rock; singer-songwriter
- Occupations: Musician; songwriter; recording engineer; record producer
- Instruments: Vocals; acoustic guitar; piano
- Years active: 1998–present
- Label: Vanguard
- Spouse: Ingrid Michaelson (m. 2011; div. 2015)
- Website: www.greglaswell.com

Greg Laswell (born April 26, 1974) is an American musician, recording engineer, and record producer from San Diego, California. He attended Valley Christian High School in Cerritos, California. He has released 7 studio albums: Good Movie in 2003, Through Toledo in 2006, Three Flights from Alto Nido in 2008, Take a Bow in 2010, Landline in 2012, I Was Going to be an Astronaut in 2014, Everyone Thinks I Dodged A Bullet in 2016, and Next Time in 2018, as well as several EPs and special singles. Many of his songs have been featured in films and television shows.

== Career ==
=== 1998–2002: Shillglen ===
Greg Laswell was born and raised in Long Beach, California. He moved to San Diego in 1993 and graduated from Point Loma Nazarene University. From 1998 through the early 2000s, Laswell was frontman for the San Diego–based band Shillglen. Members of the band included Chad Lansford (backing vocals and guitar), Justin Skeesuck (guitar), Michael de Neve (bass), Marcel de Neve (drums) and Matt Mintz (lead guitar). The band released one album, titled Sometimes I Feel, in late 1999 and had some moderate success when the band was nominated for Best Alternative Album and Best Alternative Band at the San Diego Music Awards in 2000. By mid-2001, Shillglen had over 400,000 downloads of their music through MP3.com. However, Shillglen quietly disbanded in October 2001 after Laswell suggested the band take a break. The band mutually agreed, but never regrouped.

=== 2003–2006: Good Movie and Through Toledo ===
Laswell released his first solo album Good Movie in 2003. It was self-funded and self-released on his own label All the Rest Records, and won the award for Best Local Recording by the San Diego Music Awards in 2004. Following the album's success, Laswell signed to Vanguard Records, and then recorded and released his second studio album Through Toledo in July 2006. The album was written during Laswell's divorce from his wife; he stated: "It's basically a breakup album...but the biggest surprise has been when you resurface out of the dark little studio. On this tour, people have been coming up to me and telling me about what they've been going through. It has nothing to do with anything that I originally wrote about. So it's become a full circle, healing thing. I'm just lucky to be in the loop."

=== 2008–2009: How the Day Sounds, Three Flights from Alto Nido, and Covers ===
In spring 2008, Laswell joined the European leg of the Hotel Cafe Tour, hosted by Tom McRae. He released an EP titled How the Day Sounds in March 2008, which preceded his third studio album Three Flights from Alto Nido, released in July. Several songs from the album, including "Comes and Goes (In Waves)", "How the Day Sounds" (which features Elijah Wood in the music video), "Sweet Dream", and "And Then You" have been featured in the television shows like Grey's Anatomy, True Blood, Castle, 90210, Army Wives and Dollhouse. "And Then You" was also used in the award-winning feature film Where We're Meant to Be. Laswell's single "Off I Go" was written specially for the season 5 finale of Grey's Anatomy. It was also featured on NBC's Parenthood. Laswell also contributed his cover of Cyndi Lauper's hit "Girls Just Wanna Have Fun" to the soundtracks for both Confessions of a Shopaholic and My Sister's Keeper in 2009.

In September 2008, How the Day Sounds won the Best Music Video award at the San Diego Film Festival.

In October 2009, Laswell released a new EP entitled Covers featuring five cover songs.

=== 2010–2012: Take a Bow and Landline ===
Laswell released a new full album, "Take a Bow" on May 4, 2010. All 12 new tracks were recorded in a studio in a cabin outside Flagstaff, Arizona. "Perhaps the biggest difference with this album", observes Greg Laswell of his new Take A Bow, "is that I'm not miserable." Laswell chimes in on the album stating, "I could not be more excited about how it turned out. Greg Laswell adds that after his Solo Residency Tour wraps up, a full-band tour will commence in May, in support of this new release.

He has toured with several artists over the years, including Matt Costa, Sia, Tim O'Reagan of The Jayhawks, and Amy Millan of Stars. Laswell scored several short films, including Longbranch: A Suburban Parable in 2001; Deacon's Mondays in 2006.

Laswell's fifth studio album, titled "Landline", was released on April 24, 2012.

=== 2013–2017: I Was Going to be an Astronaut and Everyone Thinks I Dodged A Bullet ===
In 2014, Laswell released his sixth studio album, I was Going to be an Astronaut, which involved remakes of many of his more popular songs, as well as a cover of Sparklehorse's It's a Wonderful Life and a new song, December, which he had cut from a previous record.

In 2016, Laswell released Everyone Thinks I Dodged A Bullet, his seventh studio album. It was featured in NBC's The Blacklist during the credits of the last episode of season 3.

=== Since 2018: Next Time and Covers II ===
In February 2018, Laswell released his latest song called "What Do I Know?" on his YouTube page.

In August 2018, Laswell released "Royal Empress", the second single from his new studio album. In September 2018, he released his full eighth studio album, Next Time.

In September 2019, Laswell released his second album of cover songs, Covers II. The album featured covers of obscure songs by PJ Harvey and The Psychedelic Furs, as well as "Lucky Man" by The Verve.

== Personal life ==
In early 2010, Laswell and fellow artist Ingrid Michaelson were engaged. They were married on August 10, 2011, in Maine. On February 27, 2015, following a rough year both physically and emotionally for Michaelson, the couple announced they were mutually splitting. A joint statement released by Michaelson and Laswell reads: "After careful consideration, and with mutual respect, we have decided to separate. We ask for privacy as we navigate this time in our lives."

== Discography ==
Greg Laswell has released 9 studio albums, 3 extended plays and 10 iTunes music singles.

== Song appearances in films and television shows ==
From Through Toledo

- "Sing, Theresa Says"
  - One Tree Hill, January 2007
  - Cold Case, October 2007
- "High and Low"
  - Without a Trace, October 2006
  - Smallville, January 2007
- "Come Undone"
  - Veronika Decides to Die promotional trailer, May 2009
  - Friday Night Lights commercial, September 2009

From Three Flights from Alto Nido

- "Comes and Goes (In Waves)"
  - True Blood, October 2008
  - Grey's Anatomy, October 2008
  - Taking Chance promotional trailer, January 2009
- "How the Day Sounds"
  - Army Wives, July 2007
  - 90210, September 2008
  - The Final Destination, August 2009
  - Sisters, December 2015
- "And Then You"
  - Grey's Anatomy, September 2008.
  - Arrow, April 2014. Season 2 Episode 20
  - Where We're Meant to Be, July 2017
- "Days Go On"
  - Grey's Anatomy, October 2008
- "Sweet Dream"
  - Dollhouse, March 2009
  - Parenthood, April 2011

From Take a Bow

- "Goodbye"
  - The Hills, May 2010
  - Grey's Anatomy, October 2010
- "Take a Bow"
  - Parenthood, September 2010
  - Friends with Benefits, July 2011
- "Let It Ride"
  - Life Unexpected, October 2010
- "Come Clean"
  - Wentworth, July 2014

From Everyone Think's I Dodged a Bullet

- "Dodged a Bullet"
  - The Blacklist, May 2016

From Covers 2

- "Love My Way"
  - Station 19, May 2020

Non-album tracks

- "What a Day"
  - Danika, December 2006
  - Numb3rs, May 2007
  - Canterbury's Law, March 2008
  - Grey's Anatomy, April 2008
  - CSI: Miami, October 2009
  - Beauty & the Beast (2012 TV series), January 2014
- "Girls Just Wanna Have Fun"
  - The Hills, 2007
  - Damages, 2008
  - Confessions of a Shopaholic, February 2009
  - My Sister's Keeper, June 2009
  - Glee, November 2011
  - The Carrie Diaries, January 2013
  - Suburgatory, March 2013
  - In the Dark (American TV series), May 2019
- "Off I Go"
  - Grey's Anatomy, May 2009
  - NCIS, September 2010
  - One Tree Hill, October 2010
  - Parenthood, February 2011
- "Your Ghost"
  - Ghost Whisperer, September 2006
  - Grey's Anatomy, October 2009
  - Dollhouse, December 2009
  - Verbotene Liebe, 2010
- "This Woman's Work"
  - Three Rivers, November 2009
  - The Vampire Diaries, October 2011
- "In Spite of Me"
  - Grey's Anatomy, November 2009
- "What Goes On" (Velvet Underground cover)
  - What Goes On, 2007

== Awards and nominations ==
=== San Diego Music Awards ===
Year	Nominee / work	Award	Result
2000	Shillglen	Best Alternative Band	Nominated
2000	Sometimes I Feel	Best Alternative Album	Nominated
2004	Good Movie	Best Local Recording	Won
2006	Greg Laswell	Best Alternative Artist	Nominated
2007	Through Toledo	Album of the Year	Nominated
2007	"Sing, Theresa Says"	Song of the Year	Won
2008	Greg Laswell	Artist of the Year	Nominated
