= NASCAR: Full Speed =

American documentary television series

- Season 3 release poster
- Country of origin: United States
- Original language: English
- No. of seasons: 2
- No. of episodes: 10

Production
- Executive producers: Connor Schell; Aaron Cohen; Ben Kennedy; Tim Clark; Matt Summers; Tally Hair; Dale Earnhardt Jr.
- Running time: 44–50 minutes
- Production companies: Words + Pictures; NASCAR Studios

Original release
- Network: Netflix
- Release: January 30, 2024 – present

NASCAR: Full Speed is a television documentary series produced in collaboration between Netflix and NASCAR to give a behind-the-scenes look at the drivers and races of the NASCAR Cup Series.

The first season covers the regular season finale at Daytona and the playoffs of the 2023 NASCAR Cup Series and was released on January 30, 2024.

A second season was announced on September 30, 2024, which premiered on May 7, 2025.

== Cast ==
- Ryan Blaney
- William Byron
- Ross Chastain
- Denny Hamlin
- Bubba Wallace
- Kyle Larson
- Christopher Bell
- Joey Logano
- Tyler Reddick

== Episodes ==
Season	Episodes	Originally released
1	5	January 30, 2024
2	5	May 7, 2025

=== Season 1 (2024) ===
No.	Title	Original release date
1	"Playoffs or Bust"	January 30, 2024
2	"Another Gear"	January 30, 2024
3	"One Last Push"	January 30, 2024
4	"Not in the Plan"	January 30, 2024
5	"Across the Line"	January 30, 2024

=== Season 2 (2025) ===
No.	Title	Original release date
1	"Teamwork Makes the Dream Work"	May 7, 2025
2	"Dark Horses"	May 7, 2025
3	"Trouble in Paradise"	May 7, 2025
4	"Opportunity Knocks"	May 7, 2025
5	"The Last Lap"	May 7, 2025

== See also ==
- List of Netflix original programming
