= Hill Country Film Festival =

Annual film festival in Fredericksburg, Texas, U.S.

The Hill Country Film Festival is a yearly film festival in Fredericksburg, Texas, United States. It was established in 2010. The executive director is Chad Matthews, and it is presented by the Hill Country Film Society, who hold free screenings at the festival and, afterward, monthly. In 2013, Texas Monthly selected it as a "quirky, discerning" pick.
