= Film festival =

Dedicated event to screen films

A film festival is an organized, extended presentation of films in one or more cinemas or screening venues, usually annually and in a single city or region. Some film festivals show films outdoors or online.

Films may be of recent date and, depending on the festival's focus, can include both international and domestic releases. Some film festivals focus on a specific format of film, such as documentary, or runtime, such as short film festivals, or genre, such as horror films, category of filmmakers, such as women, production country/region or subject matter.

Film festivals can be competitive or non-competitive, and are often regarded within the film industry as launchpads for new filmmakers and indie films, as well as boosters for established filmmakers and studio productions. The films are either invited by festival curators or selected by festival programmers from submissions made by the filmmakers, film producers, production companies, sales agents, or distributors. Often, audiences have the opportunity to watch films premiering months before their commercial release, or films that may not benefit from a wide release and would otherwise be hard to find.

The oldest film festival in the world is the Venice Film Festival. The most prestigious film festivals in the world, known as the "Big Five", are (listed chronologically according to the date of foundation): Venice, Cannes, Berlin (the original Big Three), Toronto, and Sundance. Other major festivals include Karlovy Vary, Locarno, San Sebastián, SXSW, Taormina, Telluride, Tribeca, Raindance Film Festival, Edinburgh Film Festival, Glasgow Film Festival, Slamdance Film Festival, Cinequest Film & Creativity Festival, and the three largest and most prestigious genre festivals, Sitges, Fantasia and Fantastic Fest.

== History ==
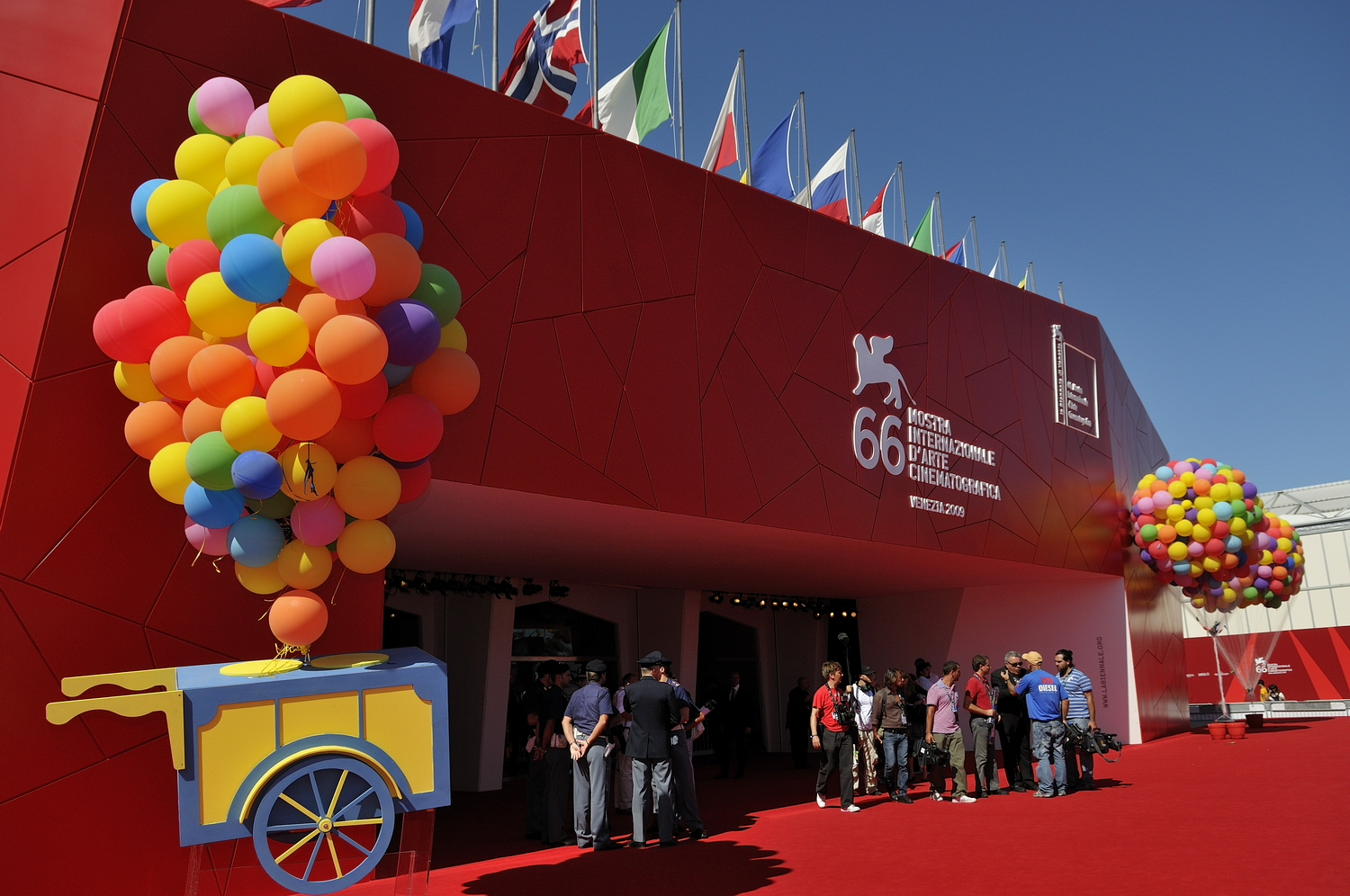
The Venice Film Festival, the oldest film festival in the world and one of the most prestigious and publicized

The Venice Film Festival in Italy began in 1932 and is the oldest film festival still running.

Mainland Europe's biggest independent film festival is ÉCU The European Independent Film Festival, which started in 2006 and takes place every spring in Paris, France. Edinburgh International Film Festival is the longest-running festival in Great Britain as well as the longest continually running film festival in the world.

Australia's first and longest-running film festival is the Melbourne International Film Festival (1952), followed by the Sydney Film Festival (1954).

North America's first and longest-running short film festival is the Yorkton Film Festival, established in 1947.

The 1948 Cleveland, Ohio Film Festival was the first film festival in the United States to recognize educational, industrial, training, travel, and other types of sponsored films.

The longest continuously running film festival in the United States is the Columbus International Film & Animation Festival, also known as The Chris Awards, which began in 1953. According to the Film Arts Foundation in San Francisco, " 'The Chris Awards' is one of the most prestigious documentaries, educational, business, and informational competitions in the U.S.; it is the oldest of its kind in North America and celebrating its 54th year". It was followed four years later by the San Francisco International Film Festival, held in March 1957, which emphasized feature-length dramatic films. The festival played a major role in introducing foreign films to American audiences. Films in the first year included Akira Kurosawa's Throne of Blood and Satyajit Ray's Pather Panchali.

Today, thousands of film festivals take place around the world—from high-profile festivals such as Sundance Film Festival (Park City, Utah), Newport Beach Film Festival and Slamdance Film Festival, to horror festivals such as FrightFest, Screamfest, Telluride Horror Show, and the Park City Film Music Festival, the first American film festival dedicated to honoring music in film.

Film Funding competitions such as Writers and Filmmakers were introduced when the cost of production could be lowered significantly, and internet technology allowed for the collaboration of film production.

Film festivals have evolved significantly since the COVID-19 pandemic. Many festivals opted for virtual or hybrid festivals. The film industry, which was already in upheaval due to streaming options, has faced another major shift, and movies showcased at festivals have an even shorter runway to online launches.

== Notable film festivals ==
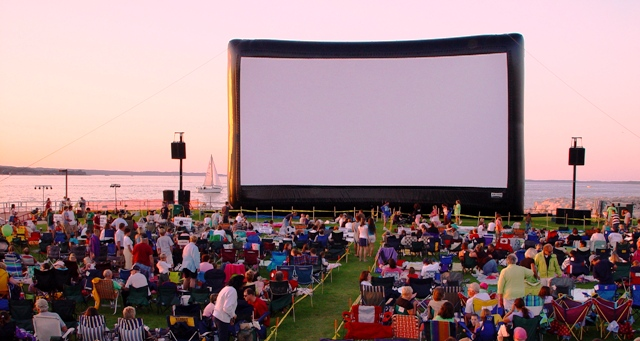
Traverse City Film Festival and their giant inflatable movie screen

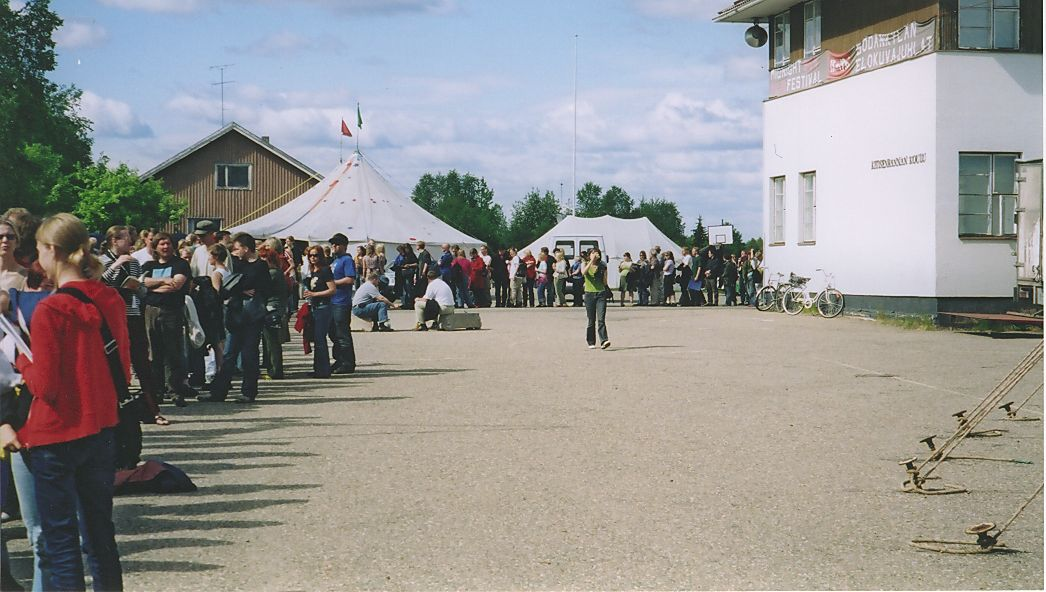
A queue to the 1999 Belgian-French film Rosetta at the Midnight Sun Film Festival in Sodankylä, Finland, in 2005

In the film industry, the 'Big Three' has historically referred to the Cannes, Berlin, and Venice festivals. The term 'Big Five', which adds Toronto and Sundance to that list, can also be used.

The Toronto International Film Festival is the most popular festival in North America. Time wrote it had "grown from its place as the most influential fall film festival to the most influential film festival, period".

The Seattle International Film Festival is credited as being the largest film festival in the United States, regularly showing over 400 films in a month across the city.

=== Competitive feature films ===
The festivals in Berlin, Cairo, Cannes, Goa, Karlovy Vary, Locarno, Mar del Plata, Moscow, San Sebastián, Shanghai, Hong Kong, Tallinn, Tokyo, Venice, and Warsaw are accredited by the International Federation of Film Producers Associations (FIAPF) in the category of competitive feature films. As a rule, for films to compete, they must first be released during the festivals and not in any other previous venue beforehand.

=== Genre films ===
Sitges Film Festival in Spain, Fantasia International Film Festival in Canada, and Fantastic Fest in the United States are generally considered to be the three largest and most prestigious festivals for fantastic and horror films. Other important genre festivals include Beyond Fest, Brooklyn Horror Film Festival, Brussels International Fantastic Film Festival, Bucheon International Fantastic Film Festival, Fantaspoa, Fantasporto, FilmQuest, FrightFest, Neuchatel International Fantastic Film Festival, Nightmares Film Festival, Overlook Film Festival, Screamfest, Telluride Horror Show and Toronto After Dark.

Some general film festivals also have sections for genre films, the most prestigious ones being the Midnight section at Sundance Film Festival, the Midnighter section at SXSW, the Midnight Madness at TIFF and the Midnight section at Tribeca Festival.

=== Experimental films ===
Ann Arbor Film Festival started in 1963. It is the oldest continually operated experimental film festival in North America and has become one of the premier film festivals for independent and, primarily, experimental filmmakers to showcase work.

=== Independent films ===
In the U.S., Telluride Film Festival, Sundance Film Festival, Austin Film Festival, Austin's South by Southwest, NYC's Tribeca Festival, Cinequest Film & Creativity Festival and Slamdance Film Festival are all considered significant festivals for independent film. The Zero Film Festival is significant as the first and only festival exclusive to self-financed filmmakers. The biggest independent film festival in the UK is Raindance Film Festival. The British Urban Film Festival (which specifically caters to Black and minority interests) was officially recognized in the 2020 New Year Honours list.

=== Sponsored films ===
The 1948 Cleveland Film Festival was the first film festival in the United States to honor educational, industrial, training, travel, and other types of sponsored films. In June 1948, six hundred people watched one or more of the 65 films screened at the one-day Cleveland Film Festival held in General Electric’s Lighting Institute at Nela Park.

In the second year of the Cleveland Film Festival, 99 16 mm films were shown and “Oscars” were awarded in eleven classifications.

Having an entry, or better yet, winning an award at the Cleveland Film Festival, was a significant event. Ads for studios and dozens of movies appeared in "Business Screen Magazine" in the late 1940s and early 1950s, promoting the film or studio as a winner at the Cleveland Film Festival.

By 1956, sponsored film festivals had become ubiquitous. In addition to dozens of city-sponsored film festivals, many organizations sponsored film festivals.

In 1957, the Cleveland Film Council, the organizers of the Cleveland Film Festival, ceased operation of the festival. Sponsored film festivals continued on, but never meant as much after that.

=== Subject-specific films ===
A few film festivals have focused on highlighting specific issues, topics, or subjects. These festivals have included mainstream and independent films. Some examples include military films, health-related film festivals, and human rights film festivals.

There are festivals, especially in the US, that highlight and promote films made by or about various ethnic groups and nationalities or feature the cinema from a specific foreign country. These include African-Americans, Asian-Americans, Mexican-Americans, Arabs, Jews, Italian, German, French, Palestinian, and Native American. The Deauville American Film Festival in France is devoted to the cinema of the United States. LGBTQ+ and Women's film festivals are also popular.

=== North American film festivals ===
Tribeca Festival, one of the most prestigious in North America, ranks first worldwide in terms of audience attendance and 11th in terms of media attendance.

The San Francisco International Film Festival, founded by Irving "Bud" Levin in 1957, is the oldest continuous annual film festival in the United States. It highlights current trends in international filmmaking and video production with an emphasis on work that has not yet secured American distribution.

The Newport Beach Film Festival, founded by Gregg Schwenk in 1999, has emerged as the largest international cinema event in coastal Southern California, attracting over 56,000 attendees to Orange County, California. The Festival partners with over 40 non-profit organizations and pairs each with a film that aligns with their mission. The films featured include World, North America, U.S., and West Coast premieres, as well as the International Spotlight Series, which celebrates foreign language films.

The Vancouver International Film Festival, founded in 1958, is one of the largest film festivals in North America. It focuses on East Asian films, Canadian films, and nonfiction films. In 2016, the audience reached 133,000 and the festival featured 324 films.

The Toronto International Film Festival, founded by Bill Marshall, Henk Van der Kolk, and Dusty Cohl, is one of North America's most important film festivals, and is the most widely attended.

The Chicago International Film Festival, founded in 1964, is North America's longest-running competitive film festival. The 60th Chicago International Film Festival, scheduled for October, will host over 40,000 attendees from around the world. The Festival's program, screening 175+ films from more than 50 countries, is presented in sections including the International Competition, New Directors Competition, Documentary, Black Perspectives, City & State, and Special Presentations.

The Cleveland International Film Festival (CIFF), founded in 1977, is the largest film festival in Ohio and among the longest-running film festivals in the United States. The film festival is held at the Playhouse Square, which are a series of elegant theaters built in the early 1920s, and the largest performing arts center in the United States outside of New York City (only Lincoln Center is larger).

The Ottawa Canadian Film Festival, abbreviated OCanFilmFest, was co-founded by Ottawa-based filmmakers Jith Paul, Ed Kucerak, and Blair Campbell in 2015. It features films of various durations and genres from filmmakers across Canada.

The Sundance Film Festival founded by Sterling Van Wagenen (then head of Wildwood, Robert Redford's company), John Earle, and Cirina Hampton Catania (both serving on the Utah Film Commission at the time) is a significant festival for independent film.

The Woodstock Film Festival was launched in 2000 by filmmakers Meira Blaustein and Laurent Rejto to bring high-quality, independent films to the Hudson Valley region of New York. In 2010, Indiewire named the Woodstock Film Festival among the top 50 independent film festivals worldwide.

The Regina International Film Festival and Awards (RIFFA) founded by John Thimothy, one of the top 5 leading international film festivals in western Canada (Regina, Saskatchewan) also been referred to as “The People's Festival of Canada”, a phrase highlighting its identity rooted in inclusivity, accessibility, and community wellbeing.

Toronto's Hot Docs, founded by filmmaker Paul Jay, is a North American documentary film festival. Toronto has the largest number of film festivals in the world, ranging from cultural, independent, and historic films.

The Seattle International Film Festival, which screens 270 features and approximately 150 short films, is the largest American film festival in terms of the number of feature productions.

The Guanajuato International Film Festival is the largest competitive film festival in Mexico. It specializes in emerging talent and is held in the last week of each July in the two colonial cities of San Miguel de Allende and Guanajuato.

Other Mexican festivals include the Guadalajara International Film Festival in Guadalajara, Oaxaca Film Fest, the Morelia International Film Festival in Morelia, Michoacan Mexico, and the Los Cabos International Film Festival founded by Scott Cross, Sean Cross, and Eduardo Sanchez Navarro, in Los Cabos, Baja Sur, Mexico are considered the most important film festivals in Latin America. In 2015, Variety called the Los Cabos International Film Festival the "Cannes of Latin America".

=== South American film festivals ===
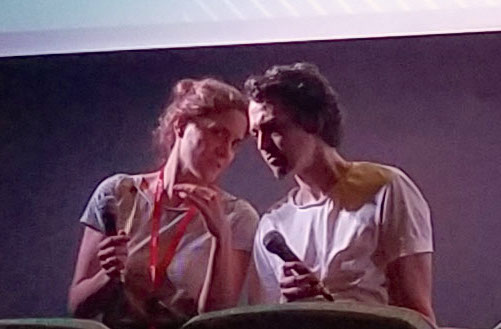
Swedish director and screenwriter Johannes Nyholm (right) presenting Koko-di Koko-da at Buenos Aires International Festival of Independent Cinema 2019

The Cartagena Film Festival, founded by Victor Nieto in 1960, is the oldest in Latin America. The Festival de Gramado (or Gramado Film Festival) Gramado, Brazil.

The Lima Film Festival is the leading film festival in Peru and one of the most important in Latin America. It is focused on Latin-American cinema and is organized each year by the Pontifical Catholic University of Peru.

The Valdivia International Film Festival is held annually in the city of Valdivia. It is arguably the most important film festival in Chile. There is also Filmambiente, held in Rio de Janeiro, Brazil, an international festival on environmental films and videos.

=== The Caribbean ===
For Spanish-speaking countries, the Dominican International Film Festival occurs annually in Puerto Plata, Dominican Republic. As well as the Havana Film Festival was founded in 1979 and is the oldest continuous annual film festival in the Caribbean. Its focus is on Latin American cinema.

The Trinidad and Tobago Film Festival, founded in 2006, is dedicated to screening the newest films from the English-, Spanish, French- and Dutch-speaking Caribbean and the region's diaspora. It also seeks to facilitate the growth of Caribbean cinema by offering a wide-ranging industry programme and networking opportunities.

The Lusca Fantastic Film Fest (formerly Puerto Rico Horror Film Fest) was also founded in 2006 and is the first and only international fantastic film festival in the Caribbean devoted to sci-fi, thriller, fantasy, dark humor, bizarre, horror, anime, adventure, virtual reality, and animation in short and feature films.

=== European festivals ===
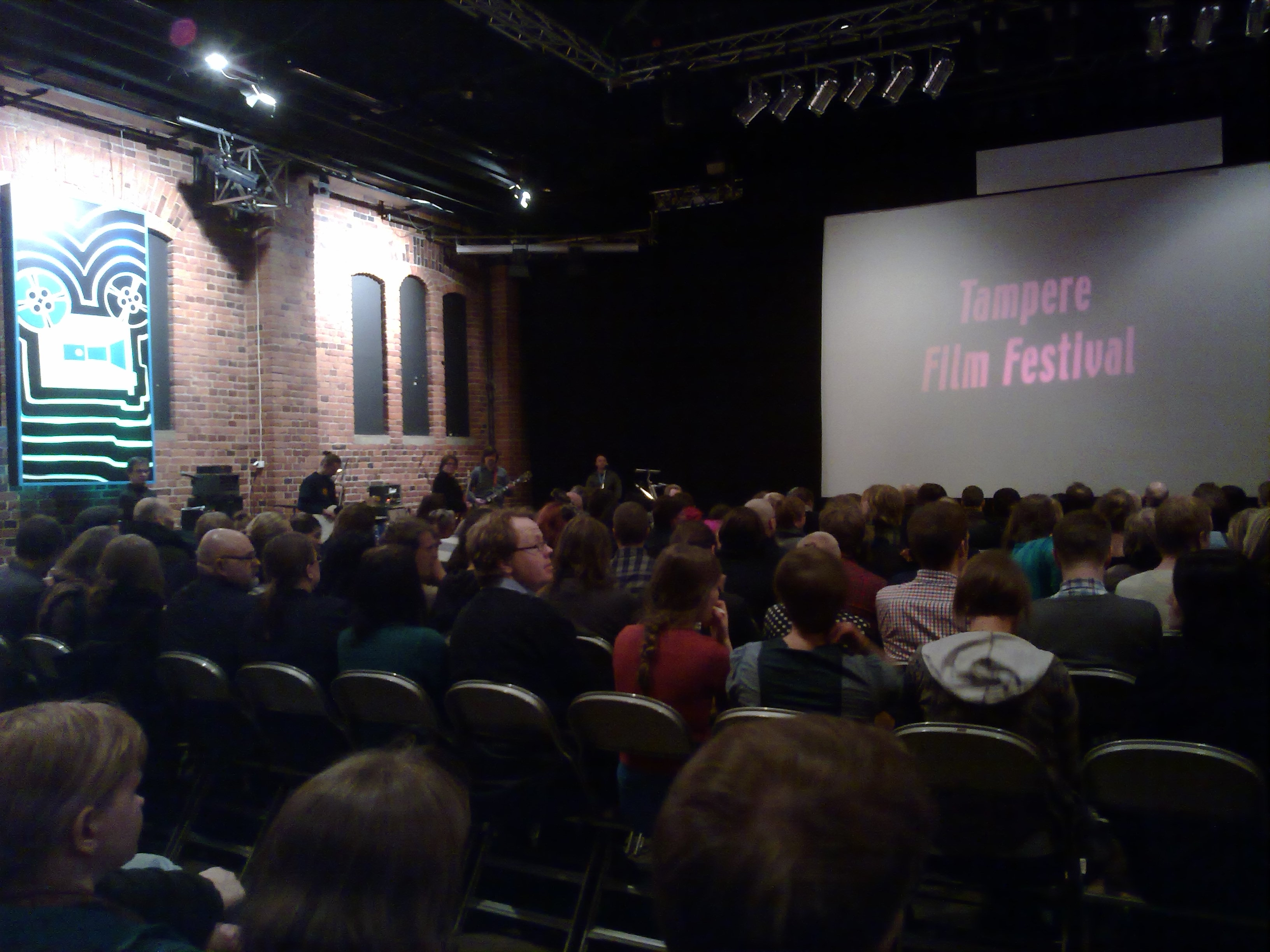
Tampere Film Festival, an international festival for short films, in 2011

The most important European film festivals are the Venice Film Festival (late summer to early autumn), the Cannes Film Festival (late spring to early summer), and the Berlin International Film Festival (late winter to early spring), founded in 1932, 1946, and 1951, respectively. The Edinburgh International Film Festival, founded in 1946, is the world's oldest continually running film festival.

=== Animation ===
Many film festivals are dedicated exclusively to animation.

- Annecy International Animated Film Festival (f. 1960—the oldest)
- Zagreb (f. 1972)
- Ottawa (f. 1976)
- Hiroshima (f. 1985)
- KROK (f. 1989)
- Anima Mundi (f. 1992)
- Fredrikstad Animation Festival (f. 1994)
- Animac (f. 1996)
- ASIFAC Animation Festival and Conference (f. 2017)

Various regional festivals occur in various countries. The Austin Film Festival is accredited by the Academy of Motion Picture Arts & Sciences, which makes all its jury-award-winning narrative short and animated short films eligible for an Academy Award.

=== African festivals ===
Several significant film festivals are held regularly in Africa. The Cairo International Film Festival in Cairo was established in 1976, the biannual Panafrican Film and Television Festival of Ouagadougou (FESPACO) in Burkina Faso was established in 1969 and accepts competition-only films by African filmmakers and chiefly produced in Africa. The annual Durban International Film Festival in South Africa and Zanzibar International Film Festival in Tanzania have grown in importance for the film and entertainment industry, as they often screen the African premieres of many international films. The Nairobi Film Festival (NBO), established in 2016 with a special focus on screening exceptional films from around the world that are rarely presented in Nairobi's mainstream cinema, has also grown in popularity over the years, improving the cinema-going culture in Kenya.

The Sahara International Film Festival, held annually in the Sahrawi refugee camps in western Algeria near the border of Western Sahara, is notable as the only film festival in the world to take place in a refugee camp. The festival aims to provide cultural entertainment and educational opportunities to refugees and raise awareness of the plight of the Sahrawi people, who have been exiled from their native Western Sahara for more than three decades.

=== Asian film festivals ===
==== India ====
The International Film Festival of India in Goa, organized by the government of India, was founded in 1952.

Chennai International Film Festival has been organized since 2002 by the Indo Cine Appreciation Foundation (ICAF), the Government of Tamil Nadu, the South Indian Film Chamber of Commerce, and the Film Federation of India.

The Jaipur International Film Festival was founded in 2009 and International Film Festival of Kerala organized by the Government of Kerala held annually at Thiruvananthapuram.

The International Documentary and Short Film Festival of Kerala (IDSFFK), hosted by the Kerala State Chalachitra Academy, is a major documentary and short film festival.

The Mumbai Women's International Film Festival (MWIFF) is an annual film festival in Mumbai that features films made by women directors and technicians.

The Calcutta International Cult Films Festival (CICFF) is a popular international film festival based in Kolkata which showcases international cult films.

YathaKatha International Film & Literature Festival (YKIFLF) is an annual film and literature festival in Mumbai showcasing literature collaboration in cinema via various constructive discussions and forums. 3rd edition of the festival was held from 28 November-1 December 2024 in Mumbai, Maharashtra, India.

==== Others ====
Notable festivals include the Hong Kong International Film Festival (HKIFF), Busan International Film Festival (BIFF), Kathmandu International Mountain Film Festival, Melbourne International Film Festival (MIFF) and World Film Carnival Singapore.

=== Arab World film festivals ===
There are several major film festivals in the Arab world, such as the Beirut International Film Festival, Cairo International Film Festival, the only international competitive feature film festival recognized by the FIAPF in the Arab world and Africa, as well as the oldest in this category, Carthage Film Festival, the oldest festival in Africa and the Arab world, Alexandria International Film Festival, and Marrakech International Film Festival.

== Festival administration ==
=== Business model ===
Although there are notable for-profit festivals such as SXSW, most festivals operate on a nonprofit membership-based model, with a combination of ticket sales, membership fees, and corporate sponsorship constituting the majority of revenue. Unlike other arts nonprofits (performing arts, museums, etc.), film festivals typically receive few donations from the general public and are occasionally organized as nonprofit business associations instead of public charities. Film industry members often have significant curatorial input, and corporate sponsors are given opportunities to promote their brand to festival audiences in exchange for cash contributions. Private parties, usually to raise investments for film projects, constitute significant "fringe" events. More prominent festivals often maintain year-round staff who frequently engage in community and charitable projects outside the festival season.

=== Entry fee ===
While entries from established film professionals are usually considered pluses by the organizers, most festivals require new or relatively unknown filmmakers to pay an entry fee to have their works considered for screening. This is especially so in more significant film festivals, such as the Calcutta International Cult Films Festival, Jaipur International Film Festival, Toronto International Film Festival, Sundance Film Festival, South by Southwest, Montreal World Film Festival, and even smaller "boutique" festivals such as the Miami International Film Festival, British Urban Film Festival and Mumbai Women's International Film Festival.

On the other hand, some festivals—usually those accepting fewer films and perhaps not attracting as many big names in their audiences as do Sundance and Telluride, require no entry fee. Many smaller film festivals in the United States, such as the Stony Brook Film Festival on Long Island, the Northwest Filmmakers' Festival, and the Sicilian Film Festival in Miami), are examples.

The Portland International Film Festival charges an entry fee but waives it for filmmakers from the Northwestern United States, and some others with regional focuses have similar approaches.

Several film festival submission portal websites exist to streamline filmmakers' entries into multiple festivals. They provide databases of festival calls for entry and offer filmmakers a convenient "describe once, submit many" service.

=== Screening out of competition ===
The core tradition of film festivals is competition, or judging which films most deserve various forms of recognition. Some festivals, such as the famous Cannes Film Festival, may screen films that are considered close to competition-quality without being included in the competition; the films are said to be screened "out of competition".

== See also ==
- Arthouse film
- Cult film
- Digital film festivals
- Foreign film
- List of film festivals
  - List of film festivals in North America
  - List of film festivals in South America
  - List of film festivals in Africa
  - List of film festivals in Asia
  - List of film festivals in Europe
  - List of film festivals in Oceania
  - List of documentary film festivals
  - List of fantastic and horror film festivals
  - List of short film festivals
  - List of fashion film festivals
- Outdoor cinema
- Outline of film
- Short film
- Sponsored film
