= Through Toledo =

Studio album by Greg Laswell
- Released: July 11, 2006
- Genre: Alternative rock
- Length: 45:18
- Label: Vanguard
- Producer: Greg Laswell

Greg Laswell chronology
| Good Movie (2003) | Through Toledo (2006) | Three Flights from Alto Nido (2008) |

Professional ratings
Review scores
| Source | Rating |
|---|---|
| Allmusic | 3.5/5 stars |
| NPR's Day to Day | (positive) |

Through Toledo is the second studio album by the San Diego, California-based singer-songwriter Greg Laswell, released by Vanguard Records on July 11, 2006. It is in the singer-songwriter style, with Laswell writing, producing, mixing and playing all of the instruments and providing the illustrations for the liner art. The lyrics were inspired by Laswell's experiences with the break-up of his marriage.

The opening track, "Sing, Theresa Says", won a San Diego Music Award for Song of the Year in 2007. The song "High and Low" was used in a 2007 episode of Smallville and "Come Undone" was used in the promotional trailer for the 2009 film adaptation of Veronika Decides to Die.

== Track listing ==
All songs written by Greg Laswell.

1. "Sing, Theresa Says" – 3:59
2. "Amazed" – 4:13
3. "Worthwhile" – 4:48
4. "Do What I Can" – 3:41
5. "High and Low" – 3:58
6. "Same As You" – 4:20
7. "Through Toledo" – 3:53
8. "I'm Hit" – 4:15
9. "Long Way Around" – 3:45
10. "Come Undone" – 5:37
11. "Your Melody" – 2:57

Bonus track (US iTunes)

12. "December" – 3:44

== Personnel ==
- Molly Jenson – background vocals
- Greg Laswell – banjo, bass guitar, drums, acoustic guitar, electric guitar, mandolin, piano, synthesizer, ukulele, lead vocals, background vocals, mixing, recording
- Derren Raser – acoustic guitar
- Trinidad Sanchez III – bass guitar
- Evren Göknar – mastering
