= Vail Film Festival =

Independent film festival

Coordinates: 39.642614°N 106.392050°W

The Vail Film Festival is an independent film festival that has taken place annually in Vail, Colorado since 2004. The 22nd annual Vail Film Festival will likely take place in December 4-7 2025.

The festival was founded by Sean Cross and Scott Cross. The Cross brothers serve as co-executive directors of the festival, with Corinne Hara serving as festival director since 2018. The festival is produced by the Colorado Film Institute, a 501(c)(3) nonprofit organization dedicated to promoting independent film.

The Vail Film Festival partnered with the European Independent Film Festival (ÉCU) for their 2026 editions. This collaboration aims to spotlight independent cinema, strengthen transatlantic artistic exchange, and deepen the creative bridge between French and American filmmaking communities, and promote French film and French and Francophile filmmakers to North America. The Vail Film Festival will also launch a French and Francophone Screenplay Competition, open exclusively to writers from France and the Francophone world. The initiative is designed to support the creation of new French and Francophone works and to strengthen transatlantic artistic exchange by promoting emerging French voices in screenwriting.

The Vail Film Festival is the sister festival of the Los Cabos International Film Festival, also co-founded by Scott Cross, and Sean Cross.

== Venues ==
Held in the largest ski resort in the United States, the festival draws attendees and filmmakers from across the United States and around the world. Since inception, the festival has drawn more than 150,000 attendees and over 3000 filmmakers, including high-profile celebrities and international media attention.

In 2007, MovieMaker Magazine rated the Vail film festival as one of the top 10 best destination film festivals in the world. It is also the only one to have partnered with Bono's Product Red initiative, whereby the festival donates 25% of pass sales to the Global Fund to fight AIDS in Africa.

Films screened at the festival have included Slow West, starring Michael Fassbender, Enemy, starring Jake Gyllenhaal, Before Sunset, starring Ethan Hawke and Julie Delpy, and the directorial debuts of David Duchovny (House of D), Luke Wilson(The Wendell Baker Story), Anna Rezan and Tiffany Thiessen. The festival has also screened a number of studio films, including Knocked Up, and Forgetting Sarah Marshall.

Past award recipients and special guests include actor Karen Allen, actor Madison Davenport, actor Krysten Ritter, actor Josh Lucas, actor Kate Bosworth, Allison Janney, director Tate Taylor, actor/director Michael Imperioli, producer Edward R. Pressman, actor/director Luke Wilson, actor William Forsythe (actor), actor Sophia Bush, actor Hayden Panettiere, actor/writer/director Harold Ramis, actor/director/producer Tim Daly, director Tao Ruspoli, actor Olivia Wilde, actor Jesse Eisenberg, actor Jeremy Davies, actor/director Zach Braff, actor/producer Jane Seymour (actress), actor Adrian Grenier, actor Michelle Monaghan, and filmmaker Kevin Smith.
