= Film Your Issue =

Film Your Issue is an international youth-focus short-film competition inviting youth to engage in contemporary issues via short films. From 2005 to 2011, thousands of youth across the world were impacted by the competition, whose media participants included Google, YouTube, Microsoft, MSNBC, AOL, Yahoo!, USA Today, Myspace, Sony, Walt Disney Entertainment, Toshiba and MTV.

Led by inaugural Honorary Jurist Walter Cronkite, the VIP Jurists included then Senator Barack Obama, Tom Brokaw, Anderson Cooper, George Clooney, and Philip Seymour Hoffman.

Founded by Heathcliff Rothman, in partnership with The American Democracy Project, the contest had its first "beta" round in 2005, and became a non-profit in 2011, under the name of the What's Your Issue Foundation, which also launched Everyone Matters, a global inclusiveness initiative.

Everyone Matters planned to relaunch Film Your Issue in 2017 for the 50 mayors, 100 cities and 150 schools which have participated with Everyone Matters in its youth programming and annual milestone, Everyone Matters Day, in April.
