= Buddy (band) =

American indie pop group

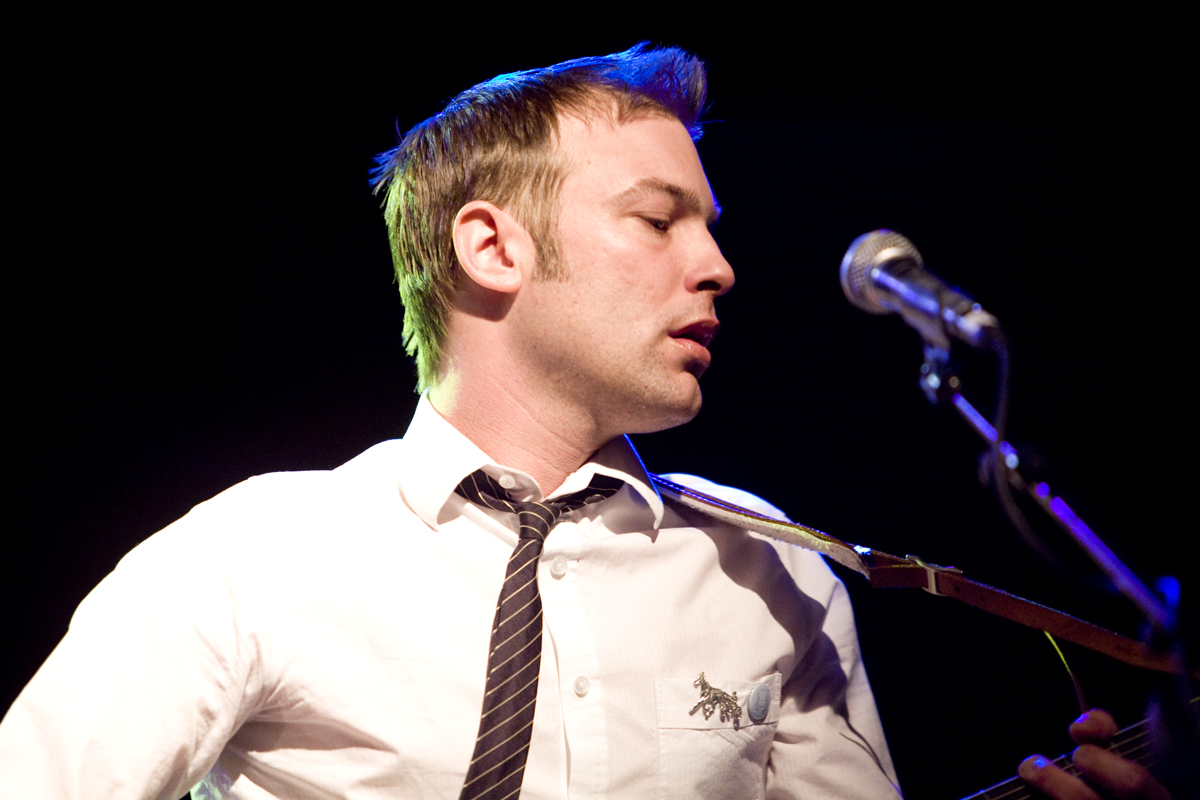

Background information
- Origin: Portland, Oregon & Los Angeles, California, U.S.
- Genres: Indie pop
- Years active: 2005–present
- Labels: Independent, Stove Punchin'
- Members: Buddy, Will Golden, Michael Jerome, Percy Haverson, Fil Krohnengold, Al Sgro

Buddy is an indie pop group from Los Angeles. It was formed in 2006 and named after the lead singer.

== Band members ==
- Buddy – Vocals, Guitar
- Will Golden – Bass/Guitar (Gary Jules, Cougar Town)
- Al Sgro – Drums (Gary Jules, Cougar Town)
- Fil Krohnengold – Keyboards/Guitar (Sara Bareilles, Golden Smog, Duncan Sheik, Operation Aloha)
- Percy Haverson Guitar (Knifeyhead aka Walk Evil Talk)

Additional members

- Holly Conlan – Vocals, Keys
- Michael Jerome – Drums (John Cale, Better than Ezra)
- Michael Tritter – Analog Sounds
- Oli Krause – Strings (Sia, Gomez, Rachael Yamagata)

== Discography ==
=== Albums ===
- Last Call For The Quiet Life (August 19, 2014) · (Stove Punchin', USA) – CD/LP/VINYL #SPRLP02
- Lighten up Francis – unreleased
- Alterations and Repairs (2010) · (Moorworks, Japan) – CD/LP
- Alterations and Repairs (2007) · (Stove Punchin', USA) – CD/LP

=== Singles and EPs ===
- "My Left Your Right" (2012) – (Stove Punchin' Records) – Digital/Single
- "campfire" (2012) – Stove Punchin' Records
- "Sun" (2011) – Stove Punchin' Records – EP – limited edition hand-painted sleeve EP, no more exist.
- More of the Shame (2005) - (self-released) – Single
- Buddy (2005) - (self-released) – CD EP
- Side By Side – Duets Vol. 1 (2008) · (Hear Me Sing) – duet performed with AM

=== Compilations and covers ===
- "The Big C" (2011) (Sony Music) charity album from the Showtime series – Track: "Say a Lot" – CD/LP
- "Indie Translations of Usher" (2005) (Urabon Records/Vitaman Records) – Track: "Bad Girl" – CD/LP
- "Perfect As Cats: A Tribute to the Cure" (2008) (Manimal Vinyl) – Track: "Sugar Girl" – 2Disk LP
