= American Democracy Project (AASCU initiative) =

The American Democracy Project (ADP) is an initiative of AASCU campuses that seeks to create an intellectual and experiential understanding of civic engagement for undergraduates enrolled at institutions that are members of AASCU. The goal of the project is to produce graduates who understand and are committed to engaging in meaningful actions as citizens in a democracy.

This project uses the definition of civic engagement proposed by Thomas Ehrlich and his colleagues in Civic Responsibility and Higher Education:

"Civic engagement means working to make a difference in the civic life of our communities and developing the combination of knowledge, skills, values and motivation to make that difference. It means promoting the quality of life in a community, through both political and non-political processes."

"A morally and civically responsible individual recognizes himself or herself as a member of a larger social fabric and therefore considers social problems to be at least partly his or her own; such an individual is willing to see the moral and civic dimensions of issues, to make and justify informed moral and civic judgments, and to take action when appropriate."

== Civic Engagement in Action Series ==
To bring the aforementioned goals to fruition, ADP has instituted a series of initiatives entitled the Civic Engagement in Action Series that involves a group of ADP campuses and external partners. There are seven initiatives:

1. The Stewardship of Public Lands
2. Seven Revolutions
3. Participatory Citizenship: American Democracy and the Jury System
4. Political Engagement Project
5. Strategies to Encouraging Voting
6. Civic Engagement and the First Year
7. Civic Commitment

Each of the initiatives deals with some critical national issue. Many of the initiatives use a case study as a way to illustrate the concerns and processes at work. The Civic Engagement in Action Series has developed and will continue to develop a variety of materials, program ideas, and recommendations for all campuses participating in the American Democracy Project.

== Constitution Day ==
In addition to these initiatives, the national office of the American Democracy Project also strives to support member campuses as they celebrate and honor Constitution Day. Constitution Day is an American federal holiday that recognizes the ratification of the United States Constitution. It is observed on September 17, the day the U.S. Constitutional Convention signed the Constitution in 1787.

== Film Your Issue ==
The American Democracy Project also was a major sponsor of Film Your Issue, a contest designed to encourage college-aged filmmakers to produce films about political topics that matter to them.
