= Los Cabos International Film Festival =

The Los Cabos International Film Festival is an international film festival that takes place annually in mid-November in Los Cabos, Mexico.

It was founded in 2012 by Scott Cross, Sean Cross, Eduardo Sanchez-Navarro Redo, Alfonso Pasquel, Juan Gallardo Thurlow, Eduardo Sanchez-Navarro Rivera Torres, and Pablo Sanchez-Navarro. The Los Cabos International Film Festival is overseen by the executive board of Eduardo Sanchez-Navarro Redo, Alfonso Pasquel, Scott Cross, and Sean Cross.

== History ==
The 2012 Los Cabos International Film Festival (formerly Baja International Film Festival) took place November 14–17 in Los Cabos, Mexico. The 2013 Los Cabos International Film Festival took place November 13–16 in Cabo San Lucas, Mexico. The 2014 Los Cabos International Film Festival took place November 12–16, 2014 in Los Cabos, Mexico. The 2015 Los Cabos International Film Festival took place November 11–15, 2015 in Los Cabos, Mexico. The 2016 Los Cabos International Film Festival took place November 9–13, 2016 in Los Cabos, Mexico. The 2017 festival took place November 8–12, 2017 in Los Cabos, Mexico. The 2018 Los Cabos International Film Festival will take place November 7–11, 2018 in Los Cabos, Mexico.

The 6th annual Los Cabos International Film Festival drew many leading filmmakers from Mexico, Canada, and the United States, and included Gala film screenings, workshops, pitch sessions, and nightly networking parties. Nicole Kidman received the Los Cabos International Film Festival 2018 Outstanding Work in Cinema tribute award.

The 5th annual Los Cabos International Film Festival drew many of the film industry's leading actors, producers, directors, and screenwriters. The festival partnered with Winston Baker to present the Film Finance Summit, with a keynote delivered by IM Global's Stuart Ford, and panelists including Vincent Maraval of Wild Bunch, Phil Hunt of Bankside Films, and producer Gaston Pavlovich, among others. Winston Baker also presented the Visionary Award to prolific producer Alex Garcia. 2016 Festival tribute recipients included Oliver Stone, Monica Bellucci, and Rodrigo Prieto. Special guests included Dennis Quaid, Cary Elwes, Craig Robinson, and Michael Pena.

The 4th annual Los Cabos International Film Festival drew over 17,000 attendees as well as hundreds of industry guests from Mexico, the U.S., and Canada. Festival honorees and special guests included Jean Marc Valee, Jared Leto, Alexander Skarsgaard, Ewan McGregor, and Liam Neeson.

The 3rd annual, 2014 festival, drew over 15,000 attendees. 2014 festival honorees and special guests included Reese Witherspoon, Rosario Dawson, Diego Luna, Atom Egoyan, Denys Arcand, Guillermo Arriaga, Piers Handling, Genna Terranova, and many others.

The 2013 Cabo International Film Festival honored Mexican actor Gael García Bernal with a tribute award, as well as director Philippe Falardeau, and one of Mexico's leading film production companies, Mantarraya Films, was also honored.

2012 festival award recipients included actors Edward Norton, Matt Dillon, Melissa Leo, Octavia Spencer, Allison Janney, and Josh Lucas, as well as director Michael Apted. The 2012 festival drew more than 5,000 attendees and hundreds of filmmakers and film executives, including high-profile celebrities and international media attention. Films screened at the 2012 festival included the Oscar-nominated NO, starring Gael García Bernal and directed by Pablo Larraín. The festival also screened a number of studio films, including Paramount's Rise of the Guardians.

== Partnerships ==
The Los Cabos International Film Festival has established partnerships with Tribeca Film Institute, Halifax's Strategic Partners, and Moscow Business Square

== See also ==
- Film festivals in North and Central America
