= Blue Iguana (disambiguation) =

The blue iguana (Cyclura lewisi) is a lizard species native to Grand Cayman.

Blue Iguana may also refer to:

- The Blue Iguana, a 1988 comedy crime film
- Dancing at the Blue Iguana, a 2000 erotic drama film
- Blue Iguana (2018 film), a romantic comedy thriller
- Daniel's Gotta Die, originally titled Blue Iguana, a 2022 comedy film
