= Judge, Jury, Executioner =

- The Walking Dead episode
- Daryl prepares to kill Dale out of mercy.
- Episode no.: Season 2 Episode 11
- Directed by: Greg Nicotero
- Written by: Angela Kang
- Cinematography by: Rohn Schmidt
- Editing by: Julius Ramsay
- Original air date: March 4, 2012

Guest appearances
- IronE Singleton as Theodore "T-Dog" Douglas; Lauren Cohan as Maggie Greene; Emily Kinney as Beth Greene; Michael Zegen as Randall Culver; Scott Wilson as Hershel Greene; Jane McNeill as Patricia; James Allen McCune as Jimmy

Episode chronology
← Previous "18 Miles Out"	Next → "Better Angels"
- The Walking Dead season 2

"Judge, Jury, Executioner" is the eleventh episode of the second season of the post-apocalyptic horror television series The Walking Dead. It originally aired on AMC in the United States on March 4, 2012. In this episode, Rick Grimes (Andrew Lincoln) and his group opt to execute Randall (Michael Zegen), much to the frustration of Dale Horvath (Jeffrey DeMunn). Dale fears that the group is losing their humanity, which prompts him to persuade some of the group members to protest against the consensus. Meanwhile, Carl Grimes (Chandler Riggs) behaves recklessly and carelessly, going as far as to steal Daryl Dixon (Norman Reedus)'s gun and harass a walker, which will ultimately initiate grave consequences for the group.

"Judge, Jury, Executioner" was directed by Greg Nicotero and written by Angela Kang. It explores themes of declining morality and humanity during a catastrophic event.

The episode features the death of Dale, who was severely injured during an attack by a walker. It also marks changes in the character development of Carl, who evolves into a desensitized character who loses his naivete to the world around him. "Judge, Jury, Executioner" features recurring appearances from several actors and actresses including Lauren Cohan (Maggie Greene), Emily Kinney (Beth Greene), Scott Wilson (Hershel Greene), Michael Zegen (Randall Culver) and IronE Singleton (T-Dog).

Commentators praised DeMunn's performance, and cited the character development and concluding scene as episode highlights. Upon airing, "Judge, Jury, Executioner" attained 6.771 million viewers and a 3.5 rating in the 18-49 demographic, according to Nielsen ratings. It became the highest-rated cable telecast of the day, as well as the highest-rated cable program of the week.

This episode marks the final appearance of Jeffrey DeMunn (Dale Horvath).

== Plot ==
Daryl beats and interrogates Randall in the barn. Randall admits he comes from a larger group of men, who had once found and raped two girls in front of their father.

The group agrees that Randall is an imminent threat, and Rick believes he should be executed but waits until sunset. Dale finds most of the group agree with Rick's decision, and attempts to change their minds by appealing to their humanity, civilization and morality. Most agree with Rick's choice for various reasons, but Shane agrees to support Dale should he be able to convince the others to change their minds. Meanwhile, Beth has since recovered from her earlier suicide attempt. When Glenn comes to check on her condition, Hershel gives him a family heirloom representing his approval of Glenn's relationship with his daughter Maggie.

As the day progresses, Rick's son Carl becomes restless and sneaks into the barn to observe Randall. Randall tries to convince Carl to release him, before Shane discovers Carl's presence and scolds him. Outside, Carol attempts to cheer Carl up by reminding him Sophia is in heaven, but Carl who is disgusted at seeing her calm about losing her daughter, lashes out at her. Carl ends up taking a gun from Daryl's stash and heading into the nearby swamp alone. He finds a walker half-stuck in mud, and taunts it by throwing rocks at it and then moves in close to shoot it in the head. The walker suddenly frees one of its legs and lurches forward; Carl panics and drops the gun before running back to camp, not telling anyone what happened.

At sunset, the group discusses Randall's fate; Dale's arguments have failed to sway the group, and he storms out. Rick, Shane, and Daryl return to the barn and Rick prepares to shoot Randall when Carl runs in and urges his father to do it. Rick is horrified and stops the execution, much to Shane's annoyance.

Dale walks alone in the fields to cool off when he comes across a cow that has had its stomach gutted. Realizing the danger, he is about to head back when a walker attacks him. The group races towards his screams, and Daryl quickly dispatches the walker; Carl realizes it is the walker he found in the swamp. Hershel finds Dale's injures are too severe and he will not survive. The group agrees to euthanize Dale, but Rick himself cannot take the shot. Daryl takes the revolver and shoots Dale.

== Production ==
Dale has become the moral center of the group and especially in this episode for him to be going around and saying, "Let's retain our humanity," he's the last guy that's preaching that at this point with Rick making the decisions he has been making of late. To lose this guy at this moment means so much for this group. It's going to be such a monumental death that it's going to affect things a great deal moving forward. It seemed like the right time and that to me, all the stories that are going to come out of this that people haven't seen yet, are worth losing the Dale/Andrea relationship.

— Robert Kirkman

"Judge, Jury, Executioner" was directed by Greg Nicotero and written by Angela Kang. The episode became Nicotero's first directing credit for a full-length television episode of the series; he had previously conceived and directed the six-part web series The Walking Dead: Torn Apart. As part of a promotional campaign, cast member Norman Reedus participated in a live chat on Entertainment Weekly coinciding with the airing of "Judge, Jury, Executioner".

This episode addresses the death of Dale Horvath, who is attacked and ripped open by a walker. Jeffrey DeMunn was "furious" about the firing of longtime friend Frank Darabont, who developed and previously acted as showrunner for the series, and asked to be let go from the show. In a 2018 interview with The Plain Dealer, DeMunn said, "I spent a week not being able to take a full breath. And then I realized, 'Oh, I can quit.' So I called them and said, 'It's a zombie show. Kill me. I don't want to do this anymore.' It was an immense relief to me." Since writer Robert Kirkman felt that Dale epitomized a character of morality and humanity, much of "Judge, Jury, Executioner" explores themes related to the declining morality of individuals during a catastrophic event. Kirkman proclaimed that Dale's death was a momentous occasion, ultimately marking a turning point for future development of The Walking Dead. "Dale's character has been the heart and soul of the show," he iterated. "He's definitely the moral compass. He's the guy that, more so than anyone, has been warning people to be careful how you let this world change you and monitoring what lengths people are going to survive. His loss is going to mean a great deal for all the characters in the show and is definitely going to represent a turn to a darker space. His death means a lot." Kirkman added that it was difficult to release DeMunn from the cast. He stated: "It's heartbreaking to lose Jeffrey DeMunn. He's really given us a lot, these last two seasons on the show. It's been amazing to work with him and get to know him and he's an awesome dude and we're definitely going to miss him."

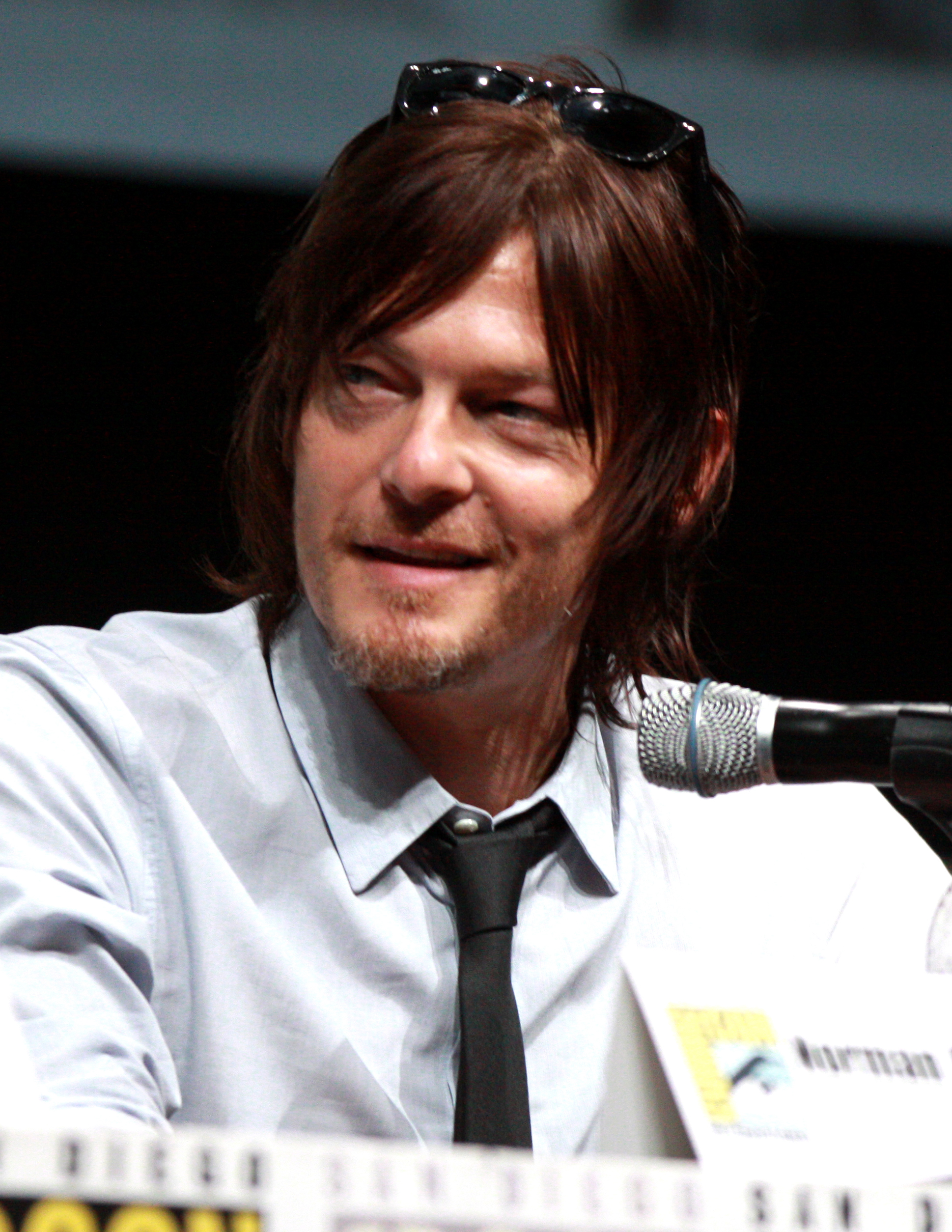
In "Judge, Jury, Executioner", Daryl (Norman Reedus, pictured) shoots Dale to put him out of his misery. Robert Kirkman felt this was Daryl's way of coping with the loss of Sophia and finding his place in the group.

In contrast to his role in the television series, Dale's comic book counterpart is among the longest surviving characters in the series, and he enters into a sexual relationship with Andrea. Kirkman asserted that it was necessary for writers to distance the development of Dale's television character from that in the comic: "I have talked many times how much I like the difference between the comics and the show. There are going to be big plot lines that we may not necessarily get to, like the romance between Dale and Andrea. If you think you really want to read that story line, that's available in the comics, and I highly recommend you pick those up. The show is always going to be a different animal and the decision to kill Dale off was a big one and it wasn't one that was made lightly."

As a visibly distraught Rick hesitates to shoot Dale, Daryl takes the gun and inevitably shoots Dale in the head. Lesley Goldberg of The Hollywood Reporter suggested that producers were subtly building up prior to the moment. Kirkman felt this marked Daryl's place in the group and was closure for the deceased Sophia Peletier, whose death caused Daryl to pull away from interacting with the group. Kirkman iterated that such actions were the testaments of his "putting everything on the line and opening himself up in a way he had never done before because his childhood was so messed up."; "So when he found out she was dead and in the barn all the time, that's why he retreated and separated himself from the group. It was because he allowed himself to care and it just backfired on him in a big way. He didn't want to be a part of the group and have those emotions and care about these people. So he's been distancing himself from them up until this point, and now he's seeing that these people need him and that he can fill a role and in being that harsh distant guy, you can do the things that no one else wants to do. He wants to step in and take that burden away from Rick for a moment. Rick is the one who stepped up and shot Sophia. Daryl saw that and because of his pain over the loss of Sophia he couldn't do that. But when he sees Rick hesitate to do the same thing with Dale he knows: this is my moment, this is where I can prove my worth, and he steps in and does what he needs to do."

In "Judge, Jury, Executioner", Carl evolves into a desensitized character and ultimately relinquishes his naïveté to the world around him. Although Entertainment Weekly writer Clark Collis drew parallels to a serial killer, Kirkman suggested this was an initiative to give more screen time to the character. He avouched that Carl was "one of the most fun characters to tell stories about in this world." He continued: "It's true of the comic and it's true of the show. Over time, we're going to start to see more and more of this kid. What's awesome about that is, think about what it would be like to grow up in this world. It's one thing to have everything you know taken away from you and have to deal with this s—y world you now have to live in. But to have barely even really recognized what the world is and how it works and what to expect and then to be thrust into this apocalyptic threat and to grow up and mature with these kinds of situations. It's going to make him grow up weird, is what I like to say."

== Reception ==
=== Ratings ===
"Judge, Jury, Executioner" was originally broadcast on March 4, 2012 in the United States on AMC. Upon airing, the episode garnered 6.771 million viewers and a 3.5 rating in the 18-49 demographic, according to Nielsen ratings. This indicates that 3.5% of people from the demographic viewed the episode. It became the highest-rated cable telecast of the day, attaining significantly higher ratings than that of Storage Wars on A&E Television and Real Housewives of Atlanta on Bravo. Similarly, the episode outperformed all cable television programs during the week dated March 4. Total viewership and ratings declined moderately from the previous installment, "18 Miles Out", which obtained 7.04 million viewers and a 3.8 rating in the 18-49 demographic.

=== Critical response ===
"Judge, Jury, Executioner" was lauded by television critics. Mark A. Perigard of the Boston Herald called it an "incredible episode"; "Walking Dead again proves it is one of the best dramas on TV and almost makes me feel good about paying my cable bill." Writing for the San Antonio Express-News, Rene Guzman opined that it "delivers all that messy drama in spades with a true gut-wrenching end to one of the series' core characters". Wetpaint's Molly Friedman stated that in "Judge, Jury, Executioner", the audience "finally had a reason to shed some tears and remember just how much we care about the original gang of apocalyptic misfits". Kevin Yeoman of The Christian Science Monitor and E! Online journalist Tierney Bricker concluded that the episode managed to effectively surprise the audience, while Cyriaque Lamar of io9 declared that "Judge, Jury, Executioner" was inferior to its predecessor by writing that it "served up a bunch of quasi-entertaining scenes of people arguing and capped them off with one of the most accidentally funny closers ever committed to basic cable". In his B+ review, Zack Handlen of The A.V. Club said that the episode continued the series' path of a more focused and central direction. Josh Jackson of Paste was intrigued with the series' exploration of morality during an apocalyptic event in "Judge, Jury, Executioner". Eric Goldman of IGN was much more pessimistic about the episode than the general consensus. In his 6.5 out of 10 rating review, he called it "especially dull" when compared to the previous installment.

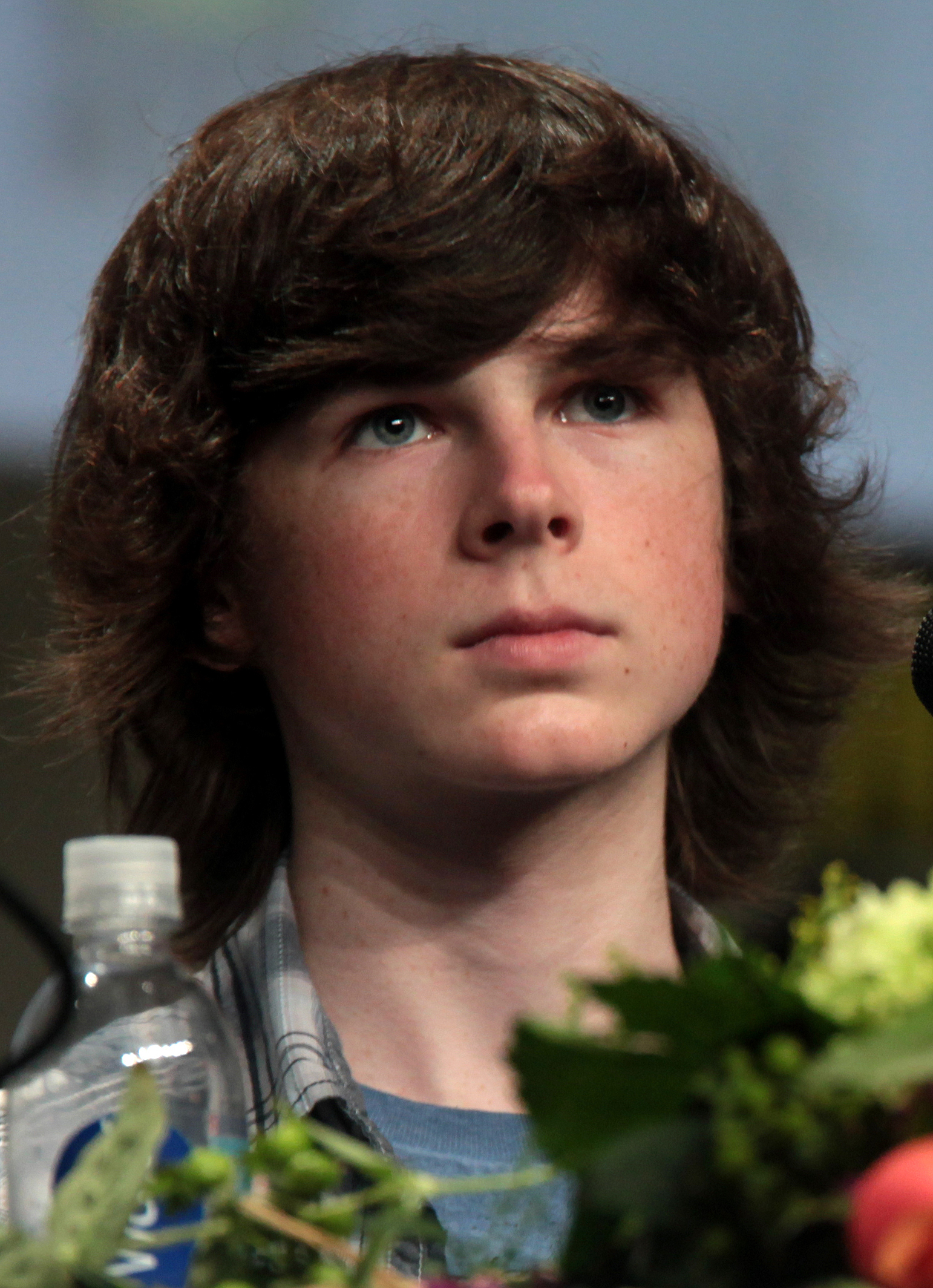
Critics were keen to the development of Carl (Chandler Riggs, pictured)

Dale's death was adulated by commentators, who affirmed that it was a gruesome and emotional scene. Scott Meslow of The Atlantic suggested that because of his death, The Walking Dead embraced a more dark and sinister philosophy. He asserted, "Taken broadly, his death marks the death of a certain morality on the show, and the embrace of a philosophy that's something crueler and darker. Dale, unlike any of the other survivors, maintained his humanity to the very end of his waking life—but even he couldn't choose not to come back as something amoral and inhuman. In a world that seems utterly incapable of getting better, it's a none-too-reassuring sign that things will almost certainly get worse." Gina McIntyre of Los Angeles Times echoed synonymous thoughts: "It's left to Daryl to shoot the man to end his suffering, which is profoundly too bad. Without Dale to raise all those nagging concerns about doing what's right, zombie apocalypse or no zombie apocalypse, I fear for the future of this walker-infested world." Handlen and Calgary Herald's Kimberly Potts thought that it was among the shocking moments in the series, while Friedman expressed that she was "riveted by the awesome attack [...] and filled with sadness, as the original gang watched their friend die a slow and painful death". Handlen remarked: "It's a shocking scene, partially for its straight-forward gore, and partially for the astonished, uncomprehending expression on Dale's face. [...] This, right here, is the kind of sequence the show needs. There's too little sense of danger right now." Verne Gay of Newsday described the sequence as "violent", and ultimately summated that DeMunn's absence will be felt as the show progresses. However, Lamar professed that the writers should have written off Dale in a more respectable way; "That wasn't the way to off the show's most annoyingly sane character. Dale's redeeming quality was his ability to guilt everybody into paying lip service to rule of law; his weakness was his naïveté. Having an escaping Randall kill him would've offered some poetic symmetry. I'm not going to miss this character, but he deserved a better send-off." Time journalist Nate Rawlings drew allusions from Dale's attack to the episode title, commenting that "when the lone zombie we see in this episode tears open Dale's stomach, spilling the contents of his body onto the cold ground, we're reminded that the walkers are the judges, they're the jury, and this particular one was a most brutal executioner." Although he was shocked by the sequence, Goldman assailed the earlier development of Dale in the episode, opining that he was obnoxious.

Handlen felt that the character development of Carl Grimes was more stable than similar developments in the episode; "Using Carl to both resolve the episode's plot, and making him semi-responsible for Dale's death, has a satisfying neatness, and serves as a reminder that for all their talk, Rick and the group have no idea what impact their choices will make." Likewise, Jackson and Ryan Rigley of MTV noticed the darker transition of the character; "Carl's moral compass has greatly shifted since being shot and seeing the walking corpse of his friend, Sophia," asserted Rigley. Jackson concluded that it was one of the episode highlights, writing, "He awakened from his coma talking about the beautiful doe, but ever since the dead body of Sophia limped its way out of that barn door, he's become colder and harder. When Carol sees him at Sophia's gravesite, she tries to comfort him with talk of heaven, and he calls her an idiot. He's looking to emulate the men leading the group—the different kinds of toughness displayed by his father, Shane and Daryl. And he finds the chance to test his own bravery, playing near a zombie stuck in the mud by the creek, keeping the discovery to himself." Jackson commented on Carl's reaction to the death of Dale, saying that despite a gradual change to a dark nature, he "realizes [...] that he's still very much a kid".
