= 18 Miles Out =

- The Walking Dead episode
- Rick gets into a heated argument with Shane.
- Episode no.: Season 2 Episode 10
- Directed by: Ernest Dickerson
- Written by: Scott M. Gimple; Glen Mazzara
- Cinematography by: Rohn Schmidt
- Editing by: Nathan D. Gunn
- Original air date: February 26, 2012

Guest appearances
- Lauren Cohan as Maggie Greene; Emily Kinney as Beth Greene; Michael Zegen as Randall Culver

Episode chronology
← Previous "Triggerfinger"	Next → "Judge, Jury, Executioner"
- The Walking Dead season 2

"18 Miles Out" is the tenth episode of the second season of the post-apocalyptic horror television series The Walking Dead. It originally aired on AMC in the United States on February 26, 2012. The episode was written by Scott M. Gimple and series showrunner Glen Mazzara and directed by Ernest Dickerson. In the episode, Rick Grimes (Andrew Lincoln) and Shane Walsh (Jon Bernthal) debate Randall (Michael Zegen)'s fate, leading to a physical battle between the two. Meanwhile, the survivors at the Greene farm deal with Beth Greene (Emily Kinney)'s suicidal behavior. In addition, this episode foreshadows the revelation that people do not need to be bitten to turn into walkers when Rick and Shane find two walkers without any sign of bite marks on them, although Rick dismisses the importance of this discovery.

Gimple added Rick and Shane's climactic fight scene into the episode's script, while Dickerson collaborated with stunt coordinator Lonnie Smith Jr. on the choreography. An 800-pound motorcycle was used in the sequence, which was lightened by emptying the gas tank. "18 Miles Out" features recurring appearances from several actors and actresses including Lauren Cohan (Maggie Greene), Emily Kinney (Beth Greene), and Michael Zegen (Randall Culver).

"18 Miles Out" was well received by a number of television commentators, who praised the storyline and character development. Upon airing, it attained 7.04 million viewers and a 3.8 rating in the 18-49 demographic, according to Nielsen ratings. The episode became the second most-viewed cable telecast of the day, as well as the second most-watched cable television program of the week.

== Plot ==
Randall, the teenager who Rick Grimes rescued, has fully recovered from his leg injury. Rick and Shane Walsh tie him up, gag him with duct tape and blindfold him, with plans to leave him at a school 18 miles from the farm. En route, Rick confronts Shane about what Lori has told him, including Shane's attraction to Lori and Shane's involvement in Otis' death.

At the school, they find a secure building and leave Randall there with a knife. As they leave, Randall pleads to take them back, and then says he had gone to school with Maggie Greene and knows her father, Hershel, suggesting he knows the farm's location. Shane prepares to kill Randall, but Rick tackles him. During the fight that follows, Rick is able to defeat Shane, who angrily breaks a window that releases a horde of walkers in the building. Shane takes safety in a school bus while Rick rescues Randall back to their vehicle. After contemplating leaving Shane, Rick returns to help Shane get to safety as well. They tie up and gag Randall again and return with him to the farm. Rick tells Shane that he will need to follow his orders to remain part of the group.

At the farmhouse, Lori, Maggie, and Andrea are taking care of Maggie's younger sister, Beth, who is now conscious. Maggie confides that Glenn has lost confidence because he feels their relationship made him lose focus at the shootout in the bar, hence Lori advises her to make Glenn "man up". The women eventually realize Beth has become suicidal and place her under suicide watch. Lori and Andrea argue; Andrea believes the decision to stay alive should be Beth's alone, while Lori strongly disagrees; Andrea and Lori criticize each other in the process.

Andrea then proceeds to take over responsibility for Beth, after convincing Maggie to take a break. She locks Beth inside the room, opens the bathroom door, and leaves Beth alone to make her own choice. She advises the pain will never subside, "but you make room for it". Beth attempts suicide by using a shard of broken mirror to cut her wrist, but Maggie and Lori manage to pry the bathroom door open in time to save Beth, who is bleeding profusely but relatively okay. Andrea returns to the house to check on Beth and is confronted by a furious Maggie. Andrea reasons that she allowed Beth to explore her choices, and Beth is now more convinced than ever that suicide is not an option. Maggie condemns Andrea's actions and forbids her from ever again setting foot inside the house.

== Production ==
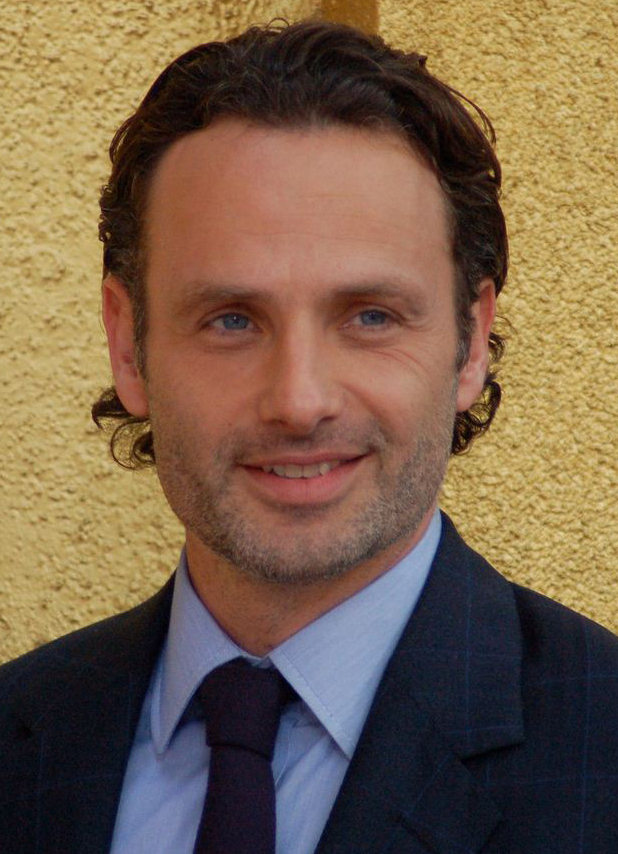
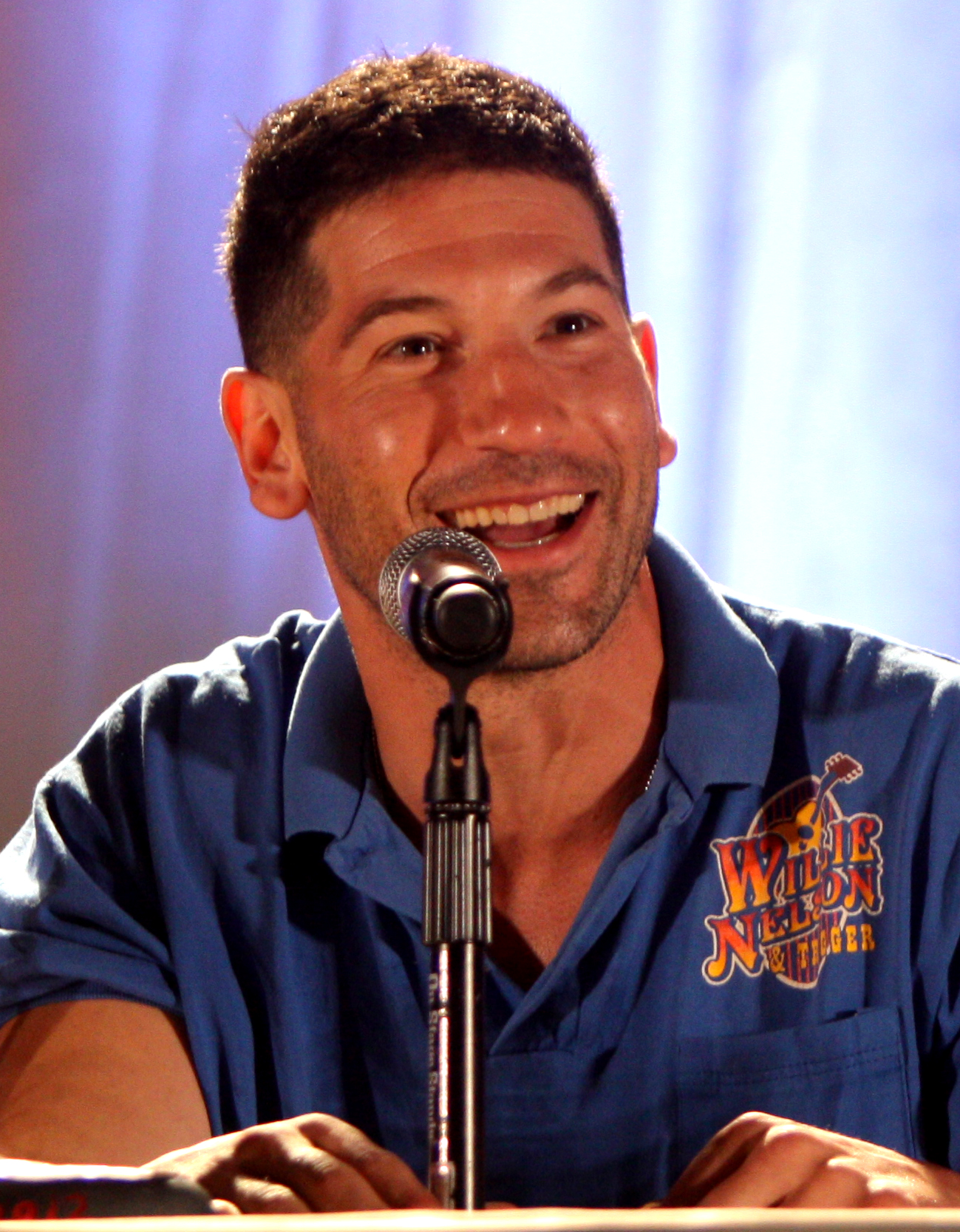
In "18 Miles Out", Rick Grimes (Andrew Lincoln, left) gets into a physical confrontation with Shane Walsh (Jon Bernthal, right).

"18 Miles Out" was directed by Ernest Dickerson and co-written by Scott M. Gimple and showrunner Glen Mazzara. The storyline between Rick Grimes and Shane Walsh reaches a climax in "18 Miles Out", in which the two men get into a heated argument, ultimately engaging in a physical confrontation. Gimple conceived and wrote the scene into the episode's script. In the fight scene, the moves were choreographed. Dickerson collaborated with Lonnie Smith Jr. who served as the stunt coordinator. Smith cast two stuntmen to demonstrate and act out the scene for Lincoln and Bernthal so they could duplicate the choreography. Jeremy Connors portrayed Rick, while Trent Bry played the role of Shane. In the fight sequence, Shane topples a motorcycle onto Rick's legs, temporarily immobilizing him. The motorcycle weighed an estimated 800 pounds; in order to decrease the weight of the vehicle, Dickerson and his team emptied the gas tank. This was rehearsed at the series' production studios. Scalan Backus, The Walking Dead's special effects technician, rigged the vehicle's footpeg to prevent it from sliding and making contact with the actors' legs. Backus also added a rod with a secure stable so it would give further clearance to the actors and increase the motorcycle's height from the ground. The cameramen filmed the shots at an angle, creating the illusion that the vehicle did hit the actors' legs. Writer Robert Kirkman summated on the aftermath of the confrontation:

At the end of this week's episode, Rick is of the mind that they're square; they've got everything out in the open, they've each said their piece and they both know where each other stands, they've had their big blowout and they're riding back in that car and Rick thinks he's handled it. He doesn't necessarily think he's got his friend back, but he thinks the matters are settled. From the look of Shane in that car, I don't know that he's necessarily thinking that. For the most part, this conflict may be put on the back burner for the time being. It definitely seems like Shane still has a bone to pick.

While returning to Hershel's farm, Shane stares at a walker in an abandoned field. Kirkman stated the walker symbolizes the growing scope of the zombie virus. "We're really just trying to show that that kind of thing is inescapable," he said. "You're just driving down the street, you look over and, 'Oh, there you go, there’s a zombie.' We're trying to show that this world is becoming more and more populated by zombies. Our thinking is that large population centers like Atlanta are really where the heart of this began and as [Rick and crew] moved out to Hershel’s farm they didn’t really encounter very many walkers because they are moving out of the city center at a faster rate than the zombie population. And that zombie population is starting to catch up with them. The area is starting to become more and more dense with walkers."

Lori Grimes accuses Andrea of participating very little in household tasks. Kirkman avouched that since the initiation of the zombie apocalypse, many of the characters have reverted to traditional gender roles; "Lori is really just aggravated over a lot of things and she's lashing out. She was serious and she wants Andrea to pull her weight; certain people are stuck with certain tasks and to a certain extent people are retreating back into traditional gender roles because of how this survival-crazy world seems to work. Lori has a lot of things going on so she's definitely going to be behaving somewhat irrationally at times as she tries to cope with the pregnancy and the conflict between Rick and Shane as well as dealing with the fact that Rick was out on the road again. She's going through a lot of stuff."

== Cultural references ==
"18 Miles Out" features several references to music, film, media, and other pop culture phenomena. The episode is structured similarly to the Breaking Bad episode "4 Days Out". Alan Sepinwall of HitFix wrote: "'18 Miles Out' has a title that's very similar to '4 Days Out', one of the most memorable episodes of Breaking Bad, and a structure that's relatively similar: our two leads go on a long drive together for what should be a routine bit of business, have a lot of conversations about where they are at this point, and then hit a major obstacle that might keep them from driving home alive." While driving in his car, Rick tells Shane of an incident with a close relative, who was sitting in blizzard-like conditions while listening to a narrative of The Lord of the Rings. A scene towards the end of the episode contains the song Driver's Seat by rock band Sniff 'n' the Tears. In the concluding scene of "18 Miles Out", the song "Civilian" by indie folk band Wye Oak can be heard playing in the background.

== Reception ==
=== Ratings ===
"18 Miles Out" was originally broadcast on February 26, 2012, in the United States on AMC. Upon airing, the episode attained 7.04 million viewers and a 3.8 rating in the 18-49 demographic, according to Nielsen ratings. Although it obtained the highest-rating in the 18-49 demographic out of any cable telecast of the day, "18 Miles Out" was the second most-viewed cable television program of the week. Its total viewership was slightly below that of the 2012 NBA All-Star Game, which garnered 7.07 million viewers. The episode became the second highest-rated cable program of the week dated February 26. Ratings and total viewership increased moderately from the previous episode, "Triggerfinger", which received 6.89 million viewers and a 3.6 rating in the 18-49 demographic.

=== Critical response ===
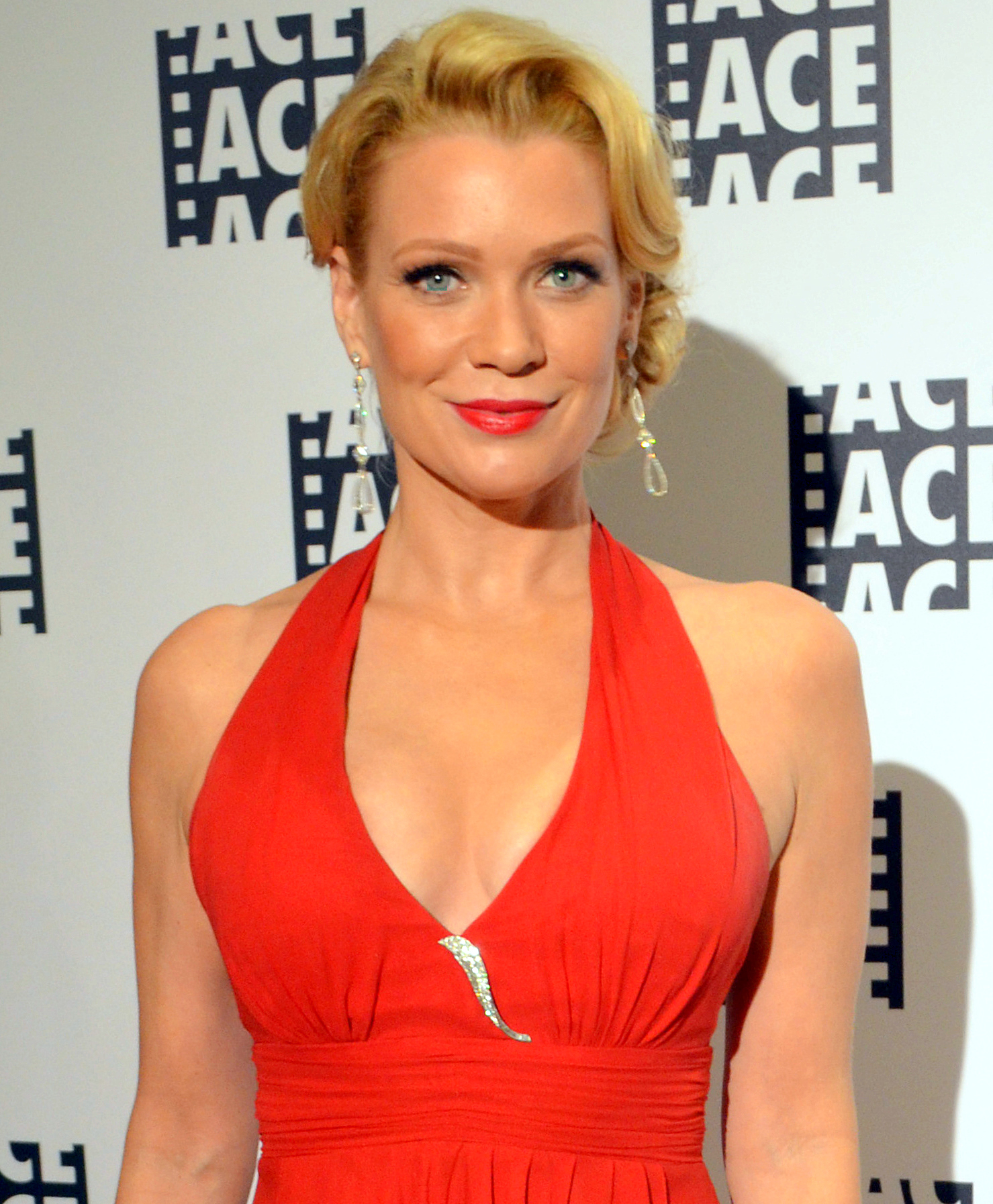
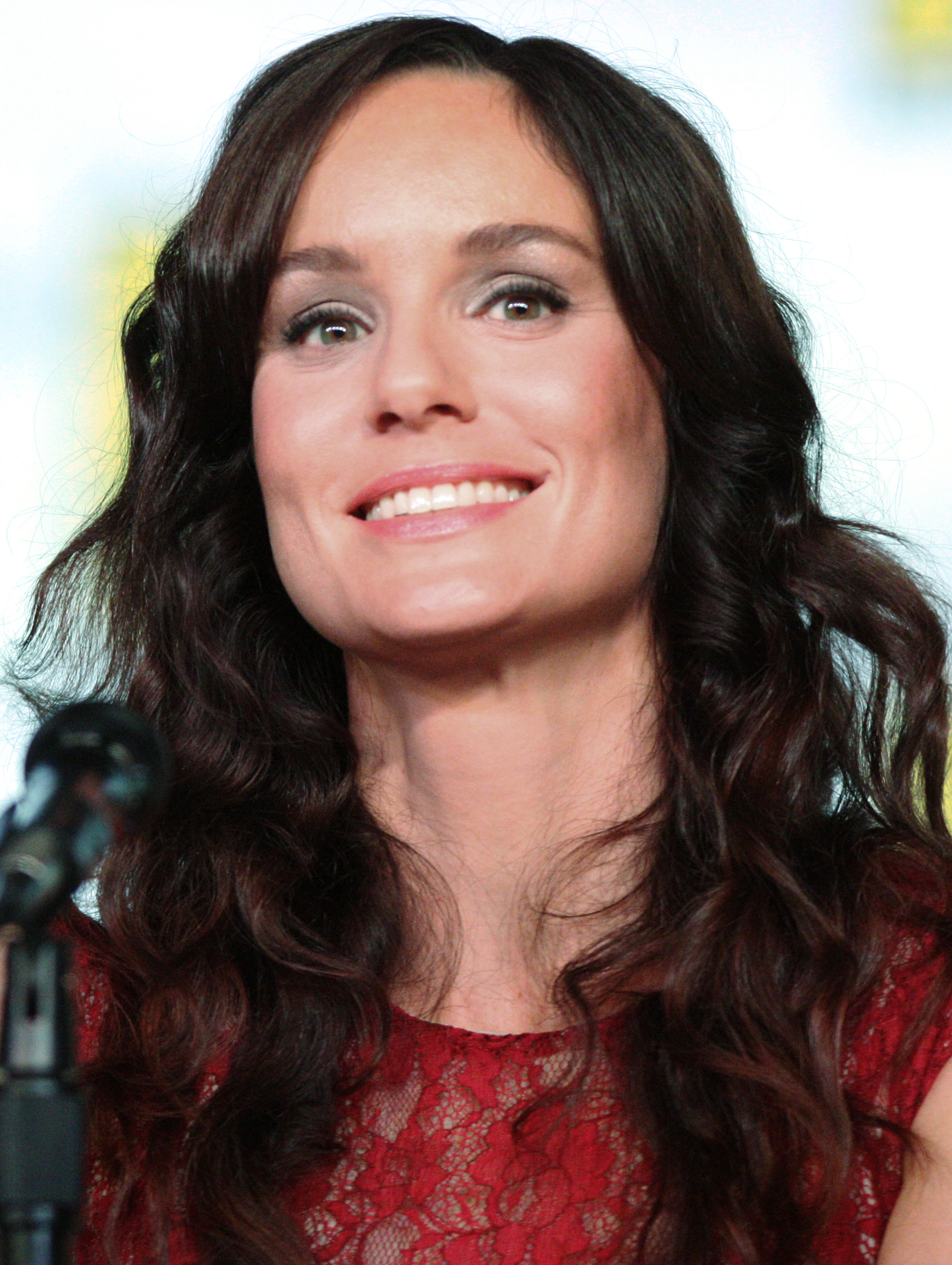
Critics were divided with the interactions between Andrea (Laurie Holden, left) and Lori (Sarah Wayne Callies, right).

"18 Miles Out" was critically acclaimed by television commentators. Bex Schwartz of Rolling Stone opined that the installment was an excellent and well-written episode, proclaiming that it "balanced zombie action with human drama". In his B grade review for the episode, Zack Halden of The A.V. Club felt that "18 Miles Out" was one of the second season's more solid attempts; "While there's no question this is still serialized, the story here had a clear beginning, middle, and end, and we stay focused the whole time on two plot arcs: Rick and Shane deciding what to do with Randall [...] while Lori, Maggie, and Andrea deal in their own individual ways with Beth’s desire to kill herself." Halden resumed that it made him hopeful of future installments of The Walking Dead. Matt Barone of Complex, Andrew Conrad of The Baltimore Sun, and IGN's Eric Goldman asserted that "18 Miles Out" was one of the series' best episodes, while The Star-Ledger's Mark Mauer thought that it was redundant, ultimately concluding that "it indulged in another subplot centered on a petty argument". Goldman professed that the episodic direction was more focused than previous installments. Concluding his review, he gave the episode a 9.5 out of 10, signifying an "amazing" rating. SFX journalist Ian Berriman echoed analogous sentiments, inevitably issuing "18 Miles Out" a four-and-a-half star rating. He called it the season's best episode, and wrote that it was filled with "action, explosive arguments, [and] difficult decisions".

Aaron Rutkoff of The Wall Street Journal touted the installment; "The writers' oratorical impulses were mostly kept in check, giving us instead an action-filled A plot in the field and a suspenseful B plot on the farm, and both have serious stakes. The motif connecting the two plots: knives. This episode was all about knives." Gary Roszko of The Huffington Post stated that "18 Miles Out" was a nice transition from what he thought was the typical development of the show. Sepinwall asserted that the episode was the strongest telecast since the second-season premiere, "What Lies Ahead". While CraveOnline writer Blair Marnell felt that it was a good telecast, he declared that "18 Miles Out" was slightly inferior to its predecessor. New York's Starlee Kine was critical of the flashbacks in the episode, who described the process as baffling. She wrote, "It was done in the oddest way, though, where the flashbacks didn’t add any additional information than that which we already knew. It was as though the writers thought a flashback could be used in place of their characters having backstories, instead of as a vehicle to convey them."

Critics lauded the development of the storyline between Shane and Rick. Writing for Best Week Ever, Dan Hopper stated that it presented a cold and eerie outlook on the future of the two men. Nate Rawlings of Time evaluated their physical confrontation as "darn good", and Alex Crumb of The Faster Times called it "wholly satisfying". Entertainment Weekly writer Darren Franich commended the fight scene; "The Shane/Rick fight was great, a brilliantly extended scuffle that started out with an air of boys-will-be-boys pettiness but quickly escalated into something genuinely homicidal." Goldman summated on the scene: "Of course, it was also gratifying to finally see that conflict turn physical, with a fight we've been waiting to see for a long time. Rick vs. Shane was appropriately brutal and did a very good job of representing the two men's different tactics—Rick was no doubt a formidable and dangerous guy in a fight, wailing on Shane with a series of punches. But Shane was going for the kill, using anything he could grab as a weapon, as he shoved a motorcycle onto Rick at one point and then threw a massive wrench at him in an effective, 'Holy S**t!' moment."
