= The Oath (American TV series) =

- Genre: Crime drama Psychological thriller
- Created by: Joe Halpin
- Starring: Ryan Kwanten; Katrina Law; Cory Hardrict; J.J. Soria; Arlen Escarpeta; Sean Bean; Christina Milian
- Composers: Fred Rapoport; Rick Butler
- Country of origin: United States
- Original language: English
- No. of seasons: 2
- No. of episodes: 18

Production
- Executive producers: Todd Hoffman; Dennis Kim; Curtis "50 Cent" Jackson; Anne Clements; Joe Halpin
- Producers: Frances Lausell; Ryan Kwanten
- Running time: 43–49 minutes
- Production companies: G-Unit Film & Television; Unforgettable Scripts; Storied Media Group

Original release
- Network: Crackle
- Release: March 8, 2018 – February 21, 2019

The Oath is an American crime drama television series, created by Joe Halpin, that premiered on March 8, 2018, on Crackle. The series stars an ensemble cast, including Ryan Kwanten, Katrina Law and Sean Bean. Its second and final season premiered on February 21, 2019.

== Premise ==
The Oath explores "a world of gangs made up of those sworn to protect and defend and sheds light on corrupt and secret societies that are nearly impossible to join. Only a select few make the cut – but once inside, members will do what they must to protect one another from enemies on the outside and from within their own ranks."

== Cast and characters ==
=== Main ===
- Ryan Kwanten as Detective Steve Hammond
- Katrina Law as Officer Karen Beach
- Cory Hardrict as Officer Cole Hammond
- J.J. Soria as Detective Pete Ramos
- Arlen Escarpeta as Officer Damon Byrd (season 1)
- Sean Bean as Tom Hammond (season 1)
- Christina Milian as Officer Christine Parks (season 2)

=== Recurring ===
- Elisabeth Röhm as Aria Price
- Robert Gosset as SAC Charles Ryder
- Isaac Keys as G
- Kwame Patterson as Neckbone
- Billy Malone as Frank Albanese
- Sarah Dumont as Kate Miller
- Aaron Abrams as David Shankman
- Linda Purl as Gwenn Hammond
- Matt Gerald as Kilvinski
- Isabel Arraiza as Lourdes
- Khotan Fernandez as Tito
- Michael Malarkey as Sam Foster
- Eve Mauro as Theresa Winters
- J. Anthony Pena as Carl Ortiz
- Markice Moore as Cornell Barnes
- Leona Lewis as Amber Hall (season 2)
- Zulay Henao as Carmen Velasquez (season 2)
- Dilshad Vadsaria as Anaya Gil (season 2)
- Sebastian Zurita as Ricardo Velasquez (season 2)
- Erik King as Pastor Greg (season 2)
- Richard Burgi as Nathan Andrews (season 2)
- Rich Paul as Eli Briggs (season 2)
- Carlos Sanz as Ignacio Velasquez (season 2)
- Kevin Connolly as James Hoke (season 2)
- Gilluis Pérez as EMT Rivera (season 1)

== Episodes ==
Season	Episodes	Originally released
1	10	March 8, 2018
2	8	February 21, 2019

=== Season 1 (2018) ===
No. overall	No. in season	Title	Directed by	Written by	Original release date
1	1	"The Deal"	Jeff T. Thomas	Joe Halpin	March 8, 2018
2	2	"Consequences"	Jeff T. Thomas	Joe Halpin	March 8, 2018
3	3	"Snag"	Luis Prieto	Mark Valadez	March 8, 2018
4	4	"Betrayal"	Luis Prieto	J.F. Halpin	March 8, 2018
5	5	"Payback"	Luis Prieto	Joe Halpin	March 8, 2018
6	6	"Allegiance"	Luis Prieto	Kathy McCormick	March 8, 2018
7	7	"Hunted"	Jeff T. Thomas	Kathy McCormick & Elizabeth Padden	March 8, 2018
8	8	"Retribution"	Jeff T. Thomas	Noah Nelson	March 8, 2018
9	9	"The Loss"	Jeff T. Thomas	Joe Halpin	March 8, 2018
10	10	"Switch"	Jeff T. Thomas	Joe Halpin	March 8, 2018

=== Season 2 (2019) ===
No. overall	No. in season	Title	Directed by	Written by	Original release date
11	1	"Revenge"	Jeff T. Thomas	Joe Halpin	February 21, 2019
12	2	"Aftermath"	Jeff T. Thomas	Noah Nelson	February 21, 2019
13	3	"Mano"	Kevin Connolly	Kathy McCormick	February 21, 2019
14	4	"Proposition"	Kevin Connolly	JF Halpin	February 21, 2019
15	5	"Succession"	Kevin Connolly	Pilar Golden	February 21, 2019
16	6	"Judas"	Scott Mann	Noah Nelson	February 21, 2019
17	7	"Exodus"	Scott Mann	Joe Halpin	February 21, 2019
18	8	"Restitution"	Scott Mann	Joe Halpin	February 21, 2019

== Production ==
=== Development ===
Promotional poster.

On April 19, 2017, it was announced that Crackle had given the production a series order for a first season consisting of ten episodes. The show was created and written by Joe Halpin who is also set to serve as the series' showrunner and executive produce alongside Curtis "50 Cent" Jackson, Todd Hoffman, and Dennis Kim. Production companies involved in the series include G-Unit Film & Television Inc. and Storied Media Group. On June 19, 2017, it was reported that Jeff T. Thomas would direct the series' first episode. On November 30, 2017, it was announced that the series would premiere on March 8, 2018.

On April 24, 2018, it was reported that Crackle had renewed the series for a second season. On November 29, 2018, it was reported that the second season would premiere on February 21, 2019.

=== Casting ===
In June 2017, it was announced that Sean Bean, Arlen Escarpeta, Ryan Kwanten, and Cory Hardrict had joined the series' main cast. In July 2017, it was announced that Katrina Law, J.J. Soria, Kwame Patterson, Elisabeth Röhm, Linda Purl, Michael Malarkey, and Eve Mauro had been cast as series regulars. It was also announced that month that Sarah Dumont, Billy Malone, Aaron Abrams, Robert Gossett, and Isaac Keys had been cast in recurring roles. On August 30, 2017, it was announced that J. Anthony Pena had joined the series in a recurring capacity. On September 14, 2017, it was announced that Isabel Arraiza had been cast in a recurring role.

On June 27, 2018, it was announced that Christina Milian was joining the cast as a series regular, while Leona Lewis and Zulay Henao were set to appear in a recurring capacity. On July 19, 2018, it was reported that Dilshad Vadsaria, Sebastian Zurita, Erik King, Richard Burgi, Rich Paul, and Carlos Sanz had been cast in recurring roles and that J. Anthony Pena would reprise his role from season one.

=== Filming ===
Principal photography for the first season began in July 2017 in Puerto Rico. Filming for season two had reportedly begun by July 2018 in San Juan, Puerto Rico.

== Release ==
On November 30, 2017, a teaser trailer for the series was released. On January 12, 2018, a second trailer was released. On January 10, 2019, a trailer for the second season was released.
