= Gina Torres =

American actress (born 1969)

- Torres at Dragon Con in 2026
- Born: April 25, 1969 (age 57); New York City, U.S.
- Occupation: Actress
- Years active: 1992–present
- Spouse: Laurence Fishburne (m. 2002; div. 2018)
- Children: 1

Gina Torres (born April 25, 1969) is an American actress. Her starring roles include Zoë Washburne in the science fiction series Firefly (2002–2003) and its feature film sequel Serenity (2005), and as Jessica Pearson in the legal drama series Suits (2011–2018) and its spin-off series Pearson (2019). Most recently, she starred on the series 9-1-1: Lone Star (2021–2025).

== Early life, family and education ==
Torres was born in New York to Catholic Cuban immigrants in The Bronx. Her father worked as a typesetter for La Prensa and the New York Daily News. Torres speaks fluent Spanish.

Torres is a mezzo-soprano. She began singing at an early age and attended Fiorello H. LaGuardia High School of Music & Art and Performing Arts in New York City.

== Career ==
In 2001, Torres won the ALMA Award for Outstanding Lead Actress in a Syndicated Drama Series for her role in Cleopatra 2525. She starred as Zoë Washburne in Fox's Firefly series, which lasted only one season, in 2002.

In 2004, Torres appeared in seven episodes of the third season on 24 as Julia Milliken, a woman who has an affair with the White House Chief of Staff and becomes involved in a presidential scandal. In 2005, she was tapped for the pilot episode of Soccer Moms. In that same year, Torres was nominated for the International Press Academy's Golden Satellite Award for Best Performance by an Actress in a Supporting Role in a Series, Drama, for her role as Jasmine in Angel. Her film appearances have included the science fiction films The Matrix Reloaded and The Matrix Revolutions (both 2003), the drama film Jam (2006), the romantic comedy film I Think I Love My Wife (2007), the independent drama film South of Pico (2007), and the drama film Selah and the Spades (2019).

Throughout her acting career, Torres has appeared in supporting roles in numerous television series, including Hercules: The Legendary Journeys, Xena: Warrior Princess, Alias, Angel, 24, The Shield, Gossip Girl, The Vampire Diaries, Hannibal, Revenge, and Westworld.

In 2005, she voiced the character of Vixen in numerous episodes of the animated series Justice League Unlimited and replaced the voice-over of Jada Pinkett Smith's character Niobe in The Matrix Online. She also reprised her Firefly role as Zoe in the film Serenity (2005).

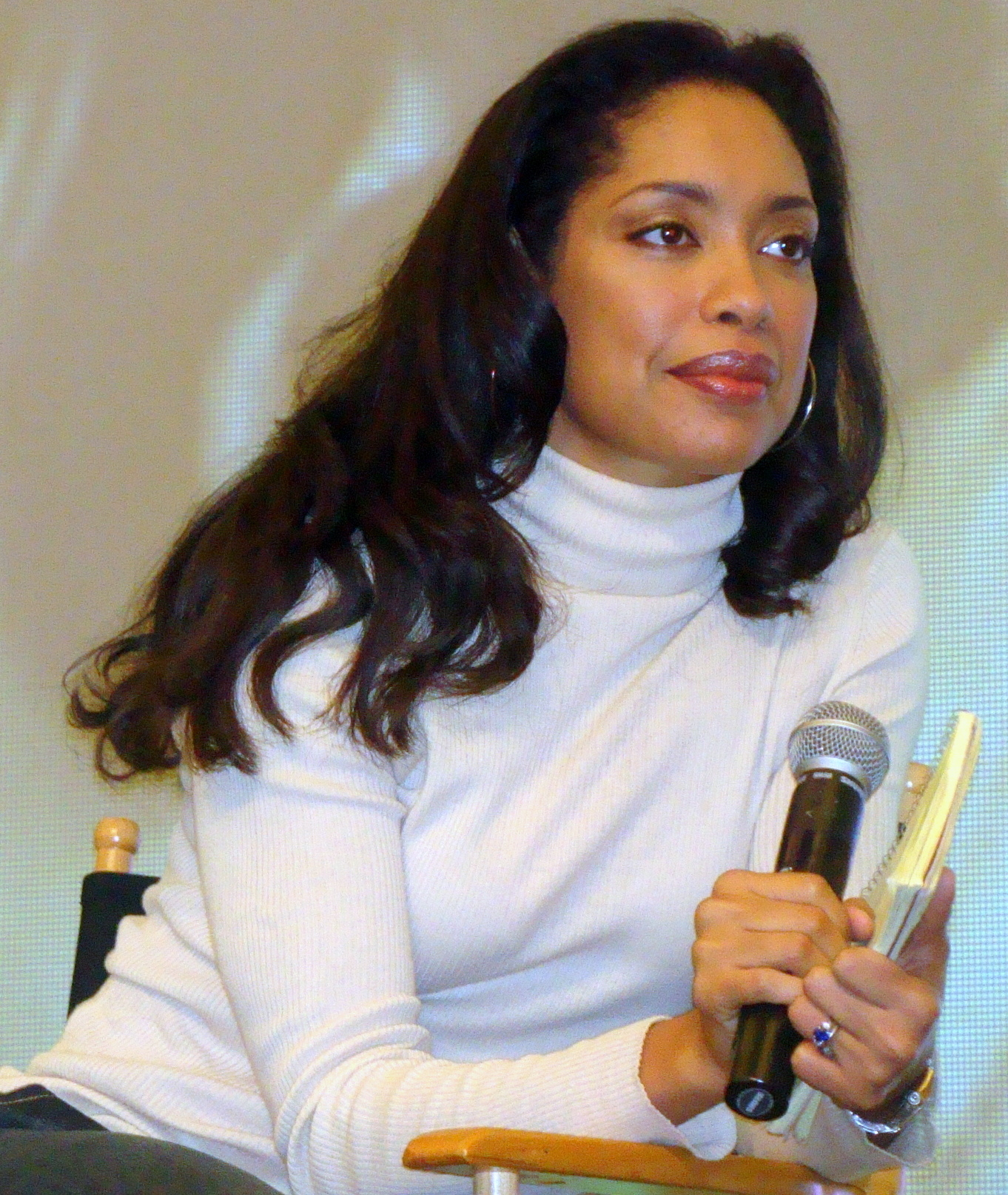
Torres in 2008

In 2006, Torres began her role as Cheryl Carrera in the short-lived drama series Standoff on the Fox network. Torres appeared in the film I Think I Love My Wife, playing the wife of Chris Rock's character.

She was cast in Washington Field, a 2009 CBS television pilot from executive producer Edward Allen Bernero, about the National Capital Response Squad, a unit of the FBI made up of elite experts in different areas who travel around the world, responding to events that affect American interests.

She was the voice of Wonder Woman in DC Universe Online massively multiplayer online role-playing game until mid 2013 when the part was recast, as well as Airachnid in the Transformers Prime cartoon.

In 2011, Torres was cast as main character Jessica Pearson on the USA Network legal drama Suits. In 2016, it was announced that Torres would be leaving the cast of Suits following the summer segment of season six. In addition to her contract being up, Torres stated she had grown tired of traveling between Toronto, where Suits is filmed, and her home in Los Angeles. She joined the season two cast of ABC's The Catch, which was filmed in L.A. Torres returned to Suits for the season six finale, which aired on March 1, 2017. Following ABC's cancellation of The Catch in May 2017, Torres returned to Suits as a recurring cast member in season seven.

Torres plays the role of CAPCOM in the updated version of Walt Disney World's Mission: Space.

In March 2018, it was announced Torres would executive produce and star in Pearson, a Suits spin-off centered on her character, Jessica Pearson.

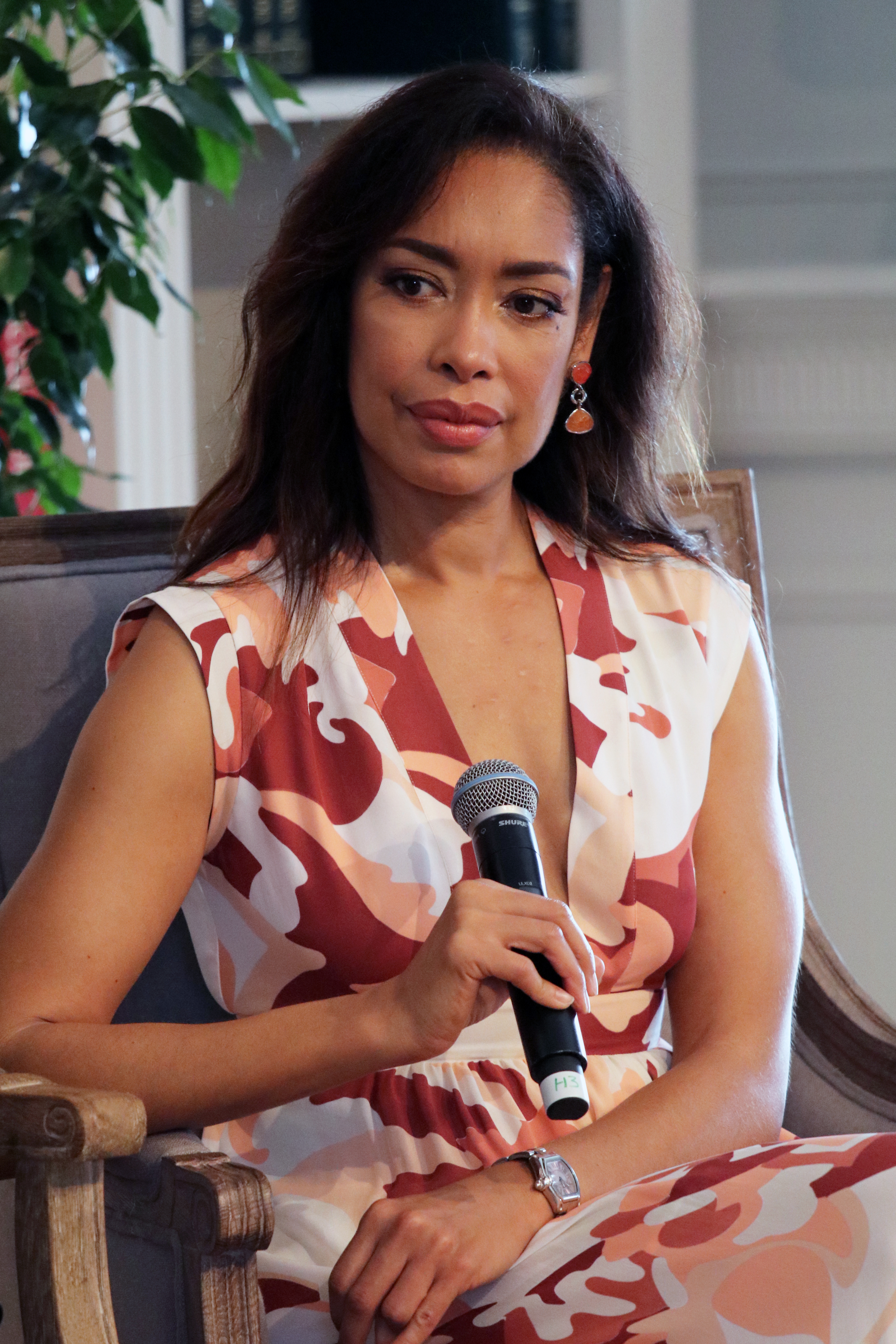
Torres at the 2018 Global Education and Skills Forum, in Dubai

It was announced on March 2, 2020, that Torres has been cast to portray Cleo Phillips in the drama pilot The Brides, which is written by Roberto Aguirre-Sacasa, but the series was not picked up by ABC.

On September 3, 2020, she was cast as Tommy Vega in the Fox drama series 9-1-1: Lone Star.

Torres will return to Broadway in October 2026, starring as Omara Portuondo in Buena Vista Social Club for a limited run.

== Personal life ==
Torres and Laurence Fishburne were engaged in February 2001, and married on September 22, 2002, at The Cloisters museum in New York City. They have a daughter together. Torres was also the stepmother to Fishburne's two children from his previous marriage to actress Hajna O. Moss. During their marriage, Torres and Fishburne played a married couple on the show Hannibal (episodes in 2013–2015).

In September 2017, Torres announced her separation from Fishburne. Fishburne filed for divorce on November 2, 2017, and the divorce was finalized on May 11, 2018, after Torres and Fishburne reached a final settlement on April 16, 2018.

On January 1, 2020, Torres was a Grand Marshal of the 2020 Rose Parade.

== Filmography ==
=== Film ===
Year	Title	Role	Notes
1996	Bed of Roses	Francine	
2003	The Matrix Reloaded	Cas	
2003	The Matrix Revolutions	Cas	
2004	Hair Show	Marcella	
2005	Fair Game	Stacey	
2005	Serenity	Zoë Washburne	
2006	Jam	Lilac	
2006	Five Fingers	Aicha	
2007	I Think I Love My Wife	Brenda Cooper	
2007	South of Pico	Carla Silva	
2009	Don't Let Me Drown	Diana	
2010	Justice League: Crisis on Two Earths	Superwoman	Voice, direct-to-video
2013	Mr. Sophistication	Janice Waters	
2019	Selah and the Spades	Maybelle Summers	
2019	Dispel	Celeste Skygoode	Short film
2023	The Perfect Find	Darcy Vale	

=== Television ===
Year	Title	Role	Notes
1992	Unnatural Pursuits	Silken	Episode: "I Don't Do Cuddles"
1992, 1995	Law & Order	Laura Elkin / Charlene	2 episodes
1994	M.A.N.T.I.S.	Dr. Amy Ellis	Television film
1995–1996	One Life to Live	Magdalena / Nell	17 episodes
1996	Dark Angel	LaMayne	Television film
1997	Profiler	Michelle Brubaker	Episode: "FTX: Field Training Exercise"
1997	The Gregory Hines Show	Jeanette	Episode: "Flirting with Disaster"
1997	Xena: Warrior Princess	Cleopatra	Episode: "The King of Assassins"
1997–1999	Hercules: The Legendary Journeys	Nebula / Beth Hymson	9 episodes
1998	La Femme Nikita	Jenna Vogler	Episode: "Open Heart"
2000–2001	Cleopatra 2525	Helen "Hel" Carter	Main role; 28 episodes
2001–2006	Alias	Anna Espinosa	6 episodes
2001–2002	Any Day Now	Stacy Trenton	7 episodes
2002–2003	Firefly	Zoë Washburne	Main role; 14 episodes
2003	The Agency	Dacia Banga	Episode: "Absolute Bastard"
2003	Angel	Jasmine	5 episodes
2003	The Law and Mr. Lee	Vicki Lee	Television film
2003	The Guardian	Sadie Harper	2 episodes
2004	CSI: Crime Scene Investigation	Warden Hutton	Episode: "XX"
2004	24	Julia Milliken	Recurring role (Season 3); 7 episodes
2004	Gramercy Park	Mrs. Hammond	Television film
2004–2006	Justice League Unlimited	Mari McCabe / Vixen	Voice, 5 episodes
2005	Soccer Moms	Jamie Cane	Television film
2006	The Shield	Sadie Kavanaugh	2 episodes
2006	Without a Trace	Tyra Hughes	Episode: "More Than This"
2006–2007	Standoff	Cheryl Carrera	Main role; 18 episodes
2007, 2009	Dirty Sexy Money	Princess Ama	2 episodes
2008	Boston Legal	A.D.A. Mary Franklin	Episode: "The Gods Must Be Crazy"
2008	Bones	Dr. Toni Ezralow	Episode: "The Bone That Blew"
2008	Criminal Minds	Det. Thea Salinas	Episode: "Normal"
2008–2009	Eli Stone	Attorney Miller	2 episodes
2009	The Unit	Sgt. Natasha Andrews	Episode: "Best Laid Plans"
2009	Applause for Miss E	Maggie	Television film
2009	Pushing Daisies	Lila Robinson	Episode: "Water & Power"
2009	Drop Dead Diva	Diana Hall	Episode: "Make Me a Match"
2009	FlashForward	Felicia Wedeck	2 episodes
2009	Washington Field	SA Jackie Palmer	Television film
2009	Gossip Girl	Gabriela Abrams	2 episodes
2010	The Vampire Diaries	Bree	Episode: "Bloodlines"
2010	The Boondocks	Ebony Brown	Voice, episode: "Lovely Ebony Brown"
2010	Huge	Dorothy Rand	Main role; 10 episodes
2011–2013	Transformers: Prime	Airachnid	Voice, 12 episodes
2011–2018	Suits	Jessica Pearson	Main role; 94 episodes
2013	Castle	Penelope Foster	Episode: "Reality Star Struck"
2013–2015	Hannibal	Phyllis "Bella" Crawford	5 episodes
2015	Con Man	Grace	Episode: "Voiced Over"
2015	Revenge	Natalie Waters	3 episodes
2015–2018	Star Wars Rebels	Ketsu Onyo	Voice, 4 episodes
2016	The Death of Eva Sofia Valdez	Eva Sofia Valdez	Television film
2016–2020	Westworld	Lauren	4 episodes
2017	The Catch	Justine Diaz	10 episodes
2017	Level Up Norge	Ikora Rey	Voice, episode: "Level Update #45"
2017	Claws	Sally Bates	Episode: "Fallout"
2017	Star Wars Forces of Destiny	Ketsu Onyo	Voice, 2 episodes
2018	Final Space	Various voices	7 episodes
2018	Angie Tribeca	Gillian Kayhill	Episode: "Behind the Scandalabra"
2019	A Black Lady Sketch Show	CIA Supervisor	Episode: "Angela Basset Is the Baddest Bitch"
2019	Pearson	Jessica Pearson	Main role; 10 episodes
2019	Tangled: The Series	Queen of Ingvarr	Voice, episode: "Beginnings"
2019	Riverdale	Mrs. Burble	Episode: "Chapter Sixty-Five: In Treatment"
2019–2020	Elena of Avalor	Chatana	Voice, 2 episodes
2020	The Brides	Cleo Phillips	Main role, unaired TV pilot
2021–2025	9-1-1: Lone Star	Tommy Vega	Main role (Seasons 2–5); 60 episodes
2022–present	The Legend of Vox Machina	Keeper Yennen	Voice
2024–2025	Kindergarten: The Musical	Ms. Sonya Moreno	Voice, main role
2026–present	Memory of a Killer	Linda Grant	Recurring role
TBA	Firefly: The Animated Series	Zoë Washburne	Voice, main role

=== Theatre ===
Year	Title	Role	Venue
1993	Face Value	Marci Williams	Cort Theatre
1994	The Best Little Whorehouse Goes Public	Terri Clark	Lunt-Fontanne Theatre
2026	Buena Vista Social Club	Omara Portuondo (adult)	Gerald Schoenfeld Theatre

=== Video games ===
Year	Title	Role
2005	The Matrix Online	Niobe
2011	DC Universe Online	Wonder Woman
2012	Transformers: Prime – The Game	Airachnid
2012	Lichdom: Battlemage	12 Age Dragon
2014	Destiny	Ikora Rey
2015	Destiny: The Taken King	Ikora Rey
2017	Destiny 2	Ikora Rey / Warlock Vanguard
2018	Destiny 2: Forsaken	Ikora Rey / Warlock Vanguard
2018	Lego DC Super-Villains	Superwoman
2019	Destiny 2: Shadowkeep	Ikora Rey / Warlock Vanguard
2023	Immortals of Aveum	General Kirkan

=== Theme park attractions ===
Year	Title	Role	Venue
2017	Mission: Space	Capcom	Epcot

== Awards and nominations ==
Year	Association	Category	Work	Result
2001	ALMA Awards	Outstanding Lead Actress in a Syndicated Drama Series	Cleopatra 2525	Won
2004	Satellite Awards	Best Supporting Actress – Drama Series	Angel	Nominated
2012	ALMA Awards	Favorite TV Actress in a Supporting Role	Suits	Nominated
2013	Imagen Awards	Best Supporting Actress – Television	Suits	Nominated
2014	Saturn Awards	Best Guest Starring Role on Television	Hannibal	Nominated
2017	Imagen Awards	Best Supporting Actress – Television	Suits	Nominated
2018	Imagen Awards	Best Supporting Actress – Television	Suits	Won
2020	Imagen Awards	Best Actress – Television	Pearson	Nominated
2021	Imagen Awards	Best Supporting Actress – Television	9-1-1: Lone Star	Nominated

== See also ==
- List of Afro-Latinos
