= Driven (2018 film) =

- Theatrical release poster
- Directed by: Nick Hamm
- Written by: Colin Bateman
- Produced by: Rene Besson; Walter Josten; Brad Feinstein; Luillo Ruiz; Piers Tempest
- Starring: Jason Sudeikis; Lee Pace; Judy Greer; Isabel Arraiza; Michael Cudlitz; Erin Moriarty; Iddo Goldberg; Tara Summers; Justin Bartha; Corey Stoll
- Cinematography: Karl Walter Lindenlaub
- Edited by: Brett M. Reed
- Music by: Geronimo Mercado
- Production companies: Romulus Entertainment; Tempo Productions; The Pimienta Film Company
- Distributed by: Universal Pictures Home Entertainment Content Group Variance Films (United States); Vertigo Releasing (United Kingdom)
- Release dates: September 8, 2018 (Venice); August 16, 2019 (United States); November 8, 2019 (United Kingdom)
- Running time: 108 minutes
- Countries: United Kingdom; United States; Puerto Rico
- Language: English
- Box office: $147,172

Driven is a 2018 biographical comedy thriller film directed by Nick Hamm and written by Colin Bateman. The film stars Jason Sudeikis, Lee Pace, Judy Greer, Isabel Arraiza, Michael Cudlitz, Erin Moriarty, Iddo Goldberg, Tara Summers, Justin Bartha, and Corey Stoll. The film premiered at the 75th Venice International Film Festival on September 8, 2018, and subsequently screened at the 2018 Toronto International Film Festival. It was released in the United States on August 16, 2019, by Universal Pictures Home Entertainment Content Group and Variance Films and in the United Kingdom on November 8, 2019, by Vertigo Releasing.

== Plot ==
Pilot James T. Hoffman is busted by the FBI when he arrives in the United States with a large amount of cocaine in his airplane. His wife and two sons are with him, having accompanied him on the flight to Bolivia. He agrees to become an informant and the FBI relocates him and his family to San Diego. Special Agent Benedict Tisa acts as his handler and continues to pressure him into setting up his boss, Morgan Hetrick, who has millions of dollars in overseas accounts from trafficking narcotics. Hoffman attempts to play both sides.

Hoffman meets John DeLorean while trying to start his car, discovering that he's his next door neighbor. DeLorean is designing the ultimate car of the future, after his continued dissatisfaction with the automobile industry and his role in it. Hoffman's and DeLorean's families become friends. Hoffman tells his wife Ellen that he's an informant, leading to tension between the two of them.

DeLorean throws many parties in order to raise funds for his new car. He receives $600,000 from Johnny Carson, who calls DeLorean during one of his parties and is put on speaker phone, where he complains about how the new car has continually broken down. Hoffman brings Hetrick to the same party in order to introduce him to DeLorean after having bragged to him about DeLorean's new car. The two of them, along with Hetrick's girlfriend, Katy, snort cocaine laced with PCP, leading to some disruption.

Hoffman works for DeLorean who struggles to raise funds and is in a large amount of debt. DeLorean asks him to raise $30,000,000. Hoffman informs Tisa that DeLorean wants to move cocaine in order to raise the money in exchange that he and his family will be safe from any criminal prosecution and that he will no longer be required to work for the FBI. Hoffman introduces DeLorean to Hetrick and Tisa who poses as a drug dealer in order to bust them both. They all agree to the deal. Problems arise when DeLorean can't raise any money for the initial deal but Hoffman convinces Tisa to loan DeLorean federal money as his undercover persona in order for the deal to go through.

Hetrick and Katy are arrested by Tisa and other agents when they deliver the cocaine. Hoffman drives DeLorean to a hotel in order to receive his money from the deal, with DeLorean unaware that he's actually meeting undercover federal agents. DeLorean is arrested after going to a room and completing the deal. Hoffman is seen testifying against DeLorean in court in flash forward scenes throughout the film. At the end of the film, while on the stand, Hoffman is unable to conclusively say whether or not DeLorean was the one who suggested the deal. DeLorean is acquitted of all charges.

Tisa informs Hoffman that he'll make sure witness protection send him and his family to Boise, Idaho. DeLorean and Hoffman meet in a cafe where DeLorean hands him keys to one of the cars he had been designing sitting outside, as well as a briefcase for his inconclusive testimony. Hoffman gets in the car and opens the briefcase which contains a large amount of money. He puts the key in the ignition and turns it but the car does not start.

== Cast ==
- Jason Sudeikis as Jim Hoffman
- Lee Pace as John DeLorean
- Judy Greer as Ellen Hoffman
- Corey Stoll as Special Agent Benedict Tisa
- Isabel Arraiza as Cristina Ferrare
- Michael Cudlitz as Morgan Hetrick
- Erin Moriarty as Katy Connors
- Justin Bartha as Howard Weitzman
- Iddo Goldberg as Roy
- Tara Summers as Molly Gibson
- Jamey Sheridan as Bill
- Yuji Okumoto as Judge Robert Takasugi

== Production ==
The film is set in San Diego but was filmed in Puerto Rico. It was five days into production when Hurricane Maria hit. Rather than abandon production entirely and film elsewhere they decided it was important to return and continue the production, as a business bringing money to the local economy. Sets needed to be rebuilt and repaired, and film locations changed. Resources were scarce, many families had no running water or power, so the few hotel rooms available were shared out. Electricity was scarce and the filmmakers had to lobby the Puerto Rican government for access to limited quantities of fuel for generators. The film employed more than 200 locals, and raised $330,000 towards relief efforts.

== Reception ==
On Rotten Tomatoes, the film has an approval rating of 63% based on 52 reviews, with an average rating of 5.9/10. The website's critics consensus reads: "Compelling performances from an outstanding cast help Driven take audiences on an enjoyably stranger-than-fiction joyride." On Metacritic the film has a weighted average score of 55 out of 100, based on 11 critics, indicating "mixed or average" reviews.

Boyd van Hoeij of The Hollywood Reporter wrote: "If the pic is ultimately an entertaining ride, it is because Sudeikis takes the audience by the hand through this very unlikely story that was inspired by true events." Guy Lodge of Variety magazine gave the film a mixed review, but praised Pace for his performance: "Against the film's own boisterous inclinations, Pace gives it something like a heart, albeit a closed, melancholic one: that's some acting, and it's maybe more than these agreeably derivative proceedings deserve."

DeLorean historians and the family of John DeLorean have criticized the film and portrayal of John DeLorean for being wildly inaccurate. The film depicts a close friendship between DeLorean and FBI informant James Hoffman, which was never the case. The character of Katy Connors portrayed by Erin Moriarty is also a fictional character created for the film.

The automobile used in the film was provided by the Puerto Rico DeLorean club, which expressed regret after seeing the completed film, saying they would have not loaned the car had they known of its negative depiction of John DeLorean and the car.

== See also ==
- Framing John DeLorean, a 2019 documentary film about the life of John DeLorean
- Tucker: The Man and His Dream, a biographical film about Preston Tucker, a producer of an automobile Tucker 48
