= Notice to Quit (film) =

2024 American film

- Theatrical release poster
- Directed by: Simon Hacker
- Written by: Simon Hacker
- Produced by: Simon Hacker; Wyatt McBride; Jordan Drake; Gordon Hayward
- Starring: Michael Zegen; Kasey Bella Suarez; Isabel Arraiza; Michael Angelo Covino; Eric Berryman; Robert Klein; Nell Verlaque; Rose Jackson-Smith
- Cinematography: Mika Altskan
- Edited by: Gilsub Choi
- Music by: Giosuè Greco
- Production companies: Whiskey Creek; Watch This Ready
- Distributed by: Whiskey Creek
- Release date: September 27, 2024
- Running time: 91 minutes
- Country: United States
- Language: English

Notice to Quit is a 2024 American independent comedy drama film directed, written, and produced by Simon Hacker, in his directorial debut. The films stars Michael Zegen as Andy Singer, a New York City realtor, whose life turns upside down when Anna, a 10-year-old daughter, arrives.

Produced and distributed by former NBA player Gordon Hayward's newly founded production company, Whiskey Creek, the film was released in the United States on September 27, 2024.

== Synopsis ==
Andy Singer, a struggling New York City realtor, finds his world crashing down around him when his estranged 10-year-old daughter, Anna, shows up unannounced on his doorstep in the middle of his eviction.

— Notice to Quit official website

== Cast ==
- Michael Zegen as Andy Singer, a New York City realtor
- Kasey Bella Suarez as Anna, Andy's 10-year old daughter
- Isabel Arraiza
- Michael Angelo Covino
- Eric Berryman
- Robert Klein
- Nell Verlaque
- Rose Jackson-Smith

== Production ==
The film was shot in 35mm in five boroughs of New York City.

== Release ==
The film was released in 400+ theaters across the United States on September 27, 2024, by Whiskey Creek.

== Reception ==
David Ehrlich of IndieWire scored the film a grade B−, writing, "Notice to Quit is redeemed by the simple fact of its nature: This isn’t a film that lives in the lows and highs of its defining moments so much as it’s a film that’s sustained by the strength it takes to put one foot in front of the other". Dan Mecca of The Film Stage praised the acting, specifically newcomer Kasey Bella Suarez writing, "Kasey Bella Suarez is one of those young performers who seems wise beyond her years." He scored the film a B, noting, "As everything comes to a head, it becomes clear that it’s not Andy we’re rooting for––it’s Anna. The city has swallowed Andy whole, but he can still do right by his daughter. For such a small, simple film, this is quite powerful." Writing for Variety, Manuel Betancourt stated in his review "With a too-neat premise rubbing up against a clearly lived-in sense of place, Notice to Quit feels like an amiable sitcom pilot set in the New York City of the Safdie brothers".
