= Outer Range =

American science fiction neo-Western television series

- Promotional poster
- Genre: Drama; Mystery; Neo-Western; Science fiction; Thriller
- Created by: Brian Watkins
- Starring: Josh Brolin; Imogen Poots; Lili Taylor; Tom Pelphrey; Tamara Podemski; Lewis Pullman; Noah Reid; Shaun Sipos; Olive Elise Abercrombie; Isabel Arraiza
- Composers: Saunder Jurriaans and Danny Bensi (season 1); Wendy & Lisa (season 2)
- Country of origin: United States
- Original language: English
- No. of seasons: 2
- No. of episodes: 15

Production
- Executive producers: Zev Borow; Josh Brolin; Dede Gardner; Jeremy Kleiner; Brad Pitt; Heather Rae; Brian Watkins; Amy Seimetz; Robin Sweet; Lawrence Trilling; Tony Krantz
- Producers: Trevor Baker; Andrew Balek; Naledi Jackson; Lucy Thurber
- Production location: Las Vegas, New Mexico
- Cinematography: Drew Daniels; Jay Keitel; Adam Newport-Berra
- Running time: 43–62 minutes
- Production companies: Amazon Studios; Plan B Entertainment; Reunion Pacific Entertainment

Original release
- Network: Amazon Prime Video
- Release: April 15, 2022 – May 16, 2024

Outer Range is an American science fiction neo-Western television series created by Brian Watkins. It features an ensemble cast that includes Josh Brolin, Imogen Poots, Lili Taylor, Tom Pelphrey, Tamara Podemski and Lewis Pullman.

The series premiered on Amazon Prime Video on April 15, 2022. In October 2022, the series was renewed for a second season, with Charles Murray taking over Watkins's position as showrunner. The second season premiered on May 16, 2024. It has received generally positive reviews, with particular praise for the performances of its cast (particularly Brolin and Poots). In July 2024, the series was canceled after two seasons.

== Premise ==
Royal Abbott is a Wyoming rancher who is fighting for his land and family. He discovers a mysterious black void in the pasture after the arrival of a female drifter, Autumn, who has a connection to Abbott's ranch. While the Abbott family copes with the disappearance of their daughter-in-law Rebecca, they are pushed further to the brink when a rival family, the Tillersons, try to take over 1200 acres of their land.

== Cast and characters ==
=== Main ===
- Josh Brolin as Royal Abbott, owner of Abbott ranch, husband of Cecilia, and father of Rhett and Perry
  - Teaguen Arbogast portrays Royal Abbott as a child and Christian James portrays him as a young adult (season 2)
- Imogen Poots as Autumn, a strange young woman who arrives at the Abbott ranch and camps out on the land
- Lili Taylor as Cecilia Abbott, the wife of Royal and mother of Rhett and Perry
  - Megan West portrays young Cecilia Abbott (season 2)
- Tom Pelphrey as Perry Abbott, Royal's elder son and the father of Amy
- Tamara Podemski as Deputy Sheriff Joy Hawk, the acting sheriff of Wabang in Amelia County, Wyoming.
- Lewis Pullman as Rhett Abbott, Royal's younger son
- Noah Reid as Billy Tillerson, the younger son of the Tillerson family
- Shaun Sipos as Luke Tillerson, the elder son of the Tillerson family
  - Preston Alkire portrays young Luke Tillerson
- Olive Elise Abercrombie as Amy Abbott, the 9-year-old daughter of Perry
- Isabel Arraiza as Maria Olivares, a bank teller that Rhett is interested in dating

=== Recurring ===
- Will Patton as Wayne Tillerson, the father of Billy and Luke and head of the family
  - Thaddeus Wojcik portrays young Wayne Tillerson as a child (season 1) and Daniel Abeles portrays him as a young adult
- Matt Lauria as Trevor Tillerson (season 1; guest season 2)
- Matthew Maher as Deputy Matt (season 1; guest season 2)
- MorningStar Angeline as Martha Hawk, the wife of Joy Hawk.
- Ofelia Garcia as Rose Hawk
- Deirdre O'Connell as Patricia Tillerson (season 1; guest season 2), the mother of Billy and Luke, and Wayne's estranged ex-wife
- Kristen Connolly (guest season 1) and Monette Moio (season 2) as Rebecca Abbott, Perry's missing wife
- Sam Strike as Deputy Jess Chinlund (season 2)
- Johnny Sneed as Pastor Ken (season 2)

=== Guest ===
- Yrsa Daley-Ward as Dr. Nia Bintu
- William Sterchi as Todd Barney
- Barry Del Sherman as Frank (season 1)
- Kevin Chamberlin as Karl Cleaver (season 1)
- William Belleau as Lewis Mays (season 2)
- Kimberly Guerrero as Falling Star (season 2)
- Michael O'Neill as Judge Pettigrew (season 2)
- Deborah Strang as Mustang Sally (season 2)
- Jim Beaver as Mr. Farber (season 2)
- John Ales as Shelton Cape (season 2)
- Lily Joy Winder as Flowers (season 2)
- River Novin as Mountain Lion (season 2)
- Tatanka Means as Officer Edgar (season 2)
- Tokala Black Elk as Officer Daniel (season 2)

== Production ==
In February 2020, it was announced that Josh Brolin had signed on to star in Outer Range. The series is executive produced by Brolin, Brian Watkins, Zev Borow, Heather Rae, Robin Sweet, Lawrence Trilling, Amy Seimetz, Tony Krantz, and Brad Pitt through his Plan B Entertainment. In December 2020, it was announced that Lewis Pullman, Noah Reid, Shaun Sipos, and Isabel Arraiza had joined the cast, alongside Brolin, Imogen Poots, Lili Taylor, Tamara Podemski, and Tom Pelphrey. In April 2023, Christian James, Megan West, Daniel Abeles, Kimberly Guerrero, and Monette Moio were cast in recurring roles for the second season.

The series marks Brolin's first television series role in nearly 20 years. It was filmed over the course of eight months in Las Vegas, New Mexico. On October 6, 2022, Amazon renewed the series for a second season. Principal photography for the second season began in April 2023.

Danny Bensi and Saunder Jurriaans composed the series' music. Milan Records have released the soundtrack.

== Episodes ==
Season	Episodes	Originally released	
Season	Episodes	First released	Last released
1	8	April 15, 2022	May 6, 2022
2	7	May 16, 2024	

=== Season 1 (2022) ===
No. overall	No. in season	Title	Directed by	Written by	Original release date
1	1	"The Void"	Alonso Ruizpalacios	Brian Watkins	April 15, 2022
In the town of Wabang, Wyoming, Royal Abbott, the owner of a large ranch, is approached by a woman named Autumn, who asks to camp out on Abbott's land. Royal accepts. The neighboring Tillerson family, Trevor, Luke, and Billy, meet Royal and his sons Rhett and Perry. They inform Royal that a particular plot of land on the ranch belongs to the Tillerson family and that redrawing the property lines will need to happen or else the Tillersons will take the Abbotts to court. Royal later finds an inexplicable, ostensibly bottomless hole on his land. Royal extends his hand into the hole and receives prophetic visions. Upon returning home, Deputy Sheriff Joy explains to the rest of his family that the authorities intend to cease investigating the disappearance of his daughter-in-law Rebecca, wife to Perry and mother to Perry's daughter, and Royal's granddaughter Amy. At a local bar later at night, Perry and Trevor, both drunk, get into a fistfight after Trevor taunts Perry about Rebecca, and Perry beats Trevor to death. Rhett and Perry bring Trevor's corpse back to the Abbott ranch, and Royal decides to cover up the killing to protect his family. After seeing Royal toss Trevor's body into the hole, Autumn confronts Royal and pushes him into the hole.
2	2	"The Land"	Alonso Ruizpalacios	Brian Watkins	April 15, 2022
Cecilia, Rhett, and Perry get their stories straight in the morning. Royal suddenly returns home after having woken up in a field. Luke meets with Joy, promising the support of the Tillerson clan in an upcoming election in exchange for her help in finding Trevor. Royal and Perry meet with the Abbott family's lawyer, who confirms the Tillersons' claim to their land and advises Royal to give it up. Instead, Royal meets with Tillerson patriarch Wayne and offers a smaller plot of land in a different part of the ranch, but Wayne refuses, adamant about the west pasture. Amy meets Autumn out in the wild, and Autumn points out a strange symbol dotted across the Abbott ranch drawing her. Royal decides to move all cattle across the farm to avoid the hole. That night, Autumn confronts Royal and questions him about what happened in the hole and how he returned. Royal doesn't answer her questions forthrightly. Instead, he recalls waking up near the hole in a seemingly other world, where soldiers and the townspeople confront him. A version of Cecilia then informed him that he had been dead for two years before warning him to run – Luke then opens fire on Royal, who turns and jumps back into the hole.
3	3	"The Time"	Jennifer Getzinger	Zev Borow	April 22, 2022
Joy arrests a criminal who warns of other missing townspeople. Autumn meets Perry. While out shopping, Cecilia sees Rebecca driving a truck and later dismisses it as an illusion. Joy confronts Rhett that night at a rodeo and states that Rhett's blood was on Trevor's belt buckle. Later, while celebrating his performance, Rhett is arrested for drunken behavior. While detained, Joy interrogates Rhett, and Rhett admits he got into a fight with Trevor but denies anyone else was there. Royal confronts Autumn and states he believes he traveled through time in the hole; he instructs her to keep silent in exchange for his knowledge. Simultaneously, Royal, Joy, and many other residents of Wabang notice a mountain briefly disappear and then reappear. While hiking, Amy discovers Trevor's corpse in the wilderness, and Royal informs Joy.
4	4	"The Loss"	Jennifer Getzinger	Brian Watkins & Lucy Thurber	April 22, 2022
Months ago, laborers on the Tillersons' ranch discovered a strange rock near the Abbott west pasture, initiating Wayne's obsession with acquiring the land. Presently, Joy and the Wabang police, along with Royal, hike to Trevor's corpse and recover the body. Joy interrogates Amy with Royal, Cecilia, and Perry present; Amy's testimony clears everyone but Rhett. Joy has her deputy attempt to intercept and question Rhett about his whereabouts before his family can alert him. However, Maria unexpectedly covers Rhett. Royal meets with and threatens Karl, the county assessor who Wayne had bribed to recognize the Tillersons' claim to the Abbott west pasture. Karl, in turn, moves the impending hearing up. Joy interrogates Maria, Rhett, and Perry separately, and their alibis begin to break down before Royal rescues them. Patricia, the matriarch of the Tillerson clan, arrives in town, quickly taking control of the household from Wayne. Joy and Patricia narrow down their focus to Rhett and Perry. However, the autopsy report on Trevor confirms that the time of death was only ten hours before the corpse's discovery despite the bar fight and subsequent disappearance happening eight days ago. At the funeral, Patricia opens the casket and deduces that Trevor's murderer was Perry when she observes him unable to look at the body. Later, Royal plays against Autumn in a poker game and wagers his west pasture against her necklace, cheating to win. Wayne receives a sign from the strange rock at night and drives out into the west field, finding the hole. Wayne and Royal then get into a fight, and Wayne bludgeons Royal unconscious with the rock before driving off.
5	5	"The Soil"	Amy Seimetz	Dominic Orlando & Naledi Jackson	April 29, 2022
Wayne drives home in a fervor, arriving at the ranchhouse and announcing to his family that he "found it" before having visions of two young boys at the hole and then suffering a stroke. Cecilia confronts Autumn who had snuck into the Abbott house to steal her necklace back, while Joy begins to interrogate witnesses to the bar fight to build up a case against Rhett and Perry. Royal meets with a local geologist who had been approached by Wayne to survey the Abbott west pasture and shows her Autumn's necklace - the geologist becomes interested in the rock and requests to study it further, but Royal refuses when he sees a photo including her and a symbol that he had previously seen when he was pushed into the hole and emerged in the other world. Looking up this symbol later, he finds it is the logo of a mining company. With Wayne incapacitated, Patricia and Luke begin proceedings to transfer ownership of the estate to Luke. Rhett spends the night with Maria, while Perry bonds with Autumn, explaining how Rebecca just vanished one night and his suspicions that she had left him. Royal takes the necklace to his barn and crushes it in a vise, releasing a black powder that seems to dissipate in his hand. He then sees Cecilia holding his lifeless body, while another Autumn, still wearing the necklace, seems to be able to perceive him and addresses him before the vision fades.
6	6	"The Family"	Amy Seimetz	Dominic Orlando & Lucy Thurber	April 29, 2022
Royal confronts Autumn, who explains that her necklace and the strange rocks on the west pasture are time, somehow in physical form. Royal threatens Autumn to stay away from his family or he will murder her, leaves her for dead in the wilderness, and then burns her campsite down. As an injured Autumn attempts to hike back to her camp, she encounters a bear which gives her the message to "show him." Later, while Billy is out hunting an elk, he stumbles into Autumn, who takes him to the hole. Patricia and Luke discover from the Tillerson family lawyer that Wayne stipulated in his will to leave everything to Billy; Patricia leaves Wabang to deal with this matter while instructing Luke to keep it a secret from Billy. Joy builds a case against Rhett and Perry, but the time of death on the coroner's report makes the timeline impossible. Joy has a spat with her partner Martha, while Rhett confronts Maria after their night together. Maria affirms that she loves him, but they cannot be together because Rhett will always prioritize his family. When Rhett challenges her, she tests him by asking about Trevor's murder, and Rhett covers up for Perry. Autumn returns to her campsite to find it destroyed. She calls someone and demands money, then carves the strange symbol into her own flesh. Later, visibly unhinged without her medication, Autumn meets with Perry and reveals that Royal attempted to kill her and that she witnessed Royal disposing of Trevor's corpse. Autumn claims she suspects Royal in Trevor's murder and asks to go to Joy together with Perry to turn him in. That night at dinner, Perry arrives home and tells his family that he has sent a confession letter to Joy. Incensed, Rhett fights Perry. Royal intervenes and he and Rhett struggle. Royal slams Perry into a glass fixture and a shard of glass hits Amy in the head, and she runs out of the house, just as a police car arrives on the property.
7	7	"The Unknown"	Lawrence Trilling	Zev Borow and Brian Watkins	May 6, 2022
Perry is taken to jail and Joy questions him about Trevor's death. Royal and Cecilia bail him out of jail, putting up the ranch as collateral until the trial. Royal drives Perry home and tells him why he ran away from home when he was a boy: while hunting in 1886, Royal accidentally shot and killed his father. Scared, he ran away and discovered the same hole that is currently on the Abbott ranch. He jumped into the hole and when he came out, it was the year 1968, and he was on the Abbott ranch; the Abbott family took him in and raised him as their own. Royal takes Perry to the hole and Perry, distraught over the current situation, jumps in and the hole disappears.
8	8	"The West"	Lawrence Trilling	Brian Watkins	May 6, 2022
Autumn waits for her money to be transferred to the bank and she gets into a heated argument with Maria. At the rodeo, Rhett is thrown off the bull he is riding and injures his shoulder. Autumn calls Amy's phone and asks for Royal. She tells him he can find her in town, and he leaves to confront her. Rhett doesn't give up and wants to ride the final round. He wins and he and Maria reconcile. Amy wanders into the parking lot and sees her mother, Rebecca. She tells Amy to come with her and the two of them leave. Cecilia realizes Amy is missing and searches for her. Meanwhile, Joy sees thousands of bison stampeding across the fields and several Native Americans hunting them. Royal confronts Autumn in town and she and Billy attempt to kill him, resulting in a gunfight while they drive. Luke digs a hole in the ground, thinking he will find what will make him rich. Oil starts coming out of the ground, but it transforms into the swirling mist of the hole and stampeding bison emerge. They trample Luke and continue to stampede. Royal manages to injure Billy while they are still driving and Billy's truck crashes. Autumn is ejected from the truck and Royal goes to finish her off. Before he can, the bison stampede through the area. Royal takes cover under the truck, but Autumn is trampled. Royal checks on her after the bison leave and discovers that she has a scar on her head in the same place where Amy was hit with the glass shard, revealing that she is actually Amy from the future. He takes her home and places Amy on her bed. He finds Cecilia sitting at the kitchen table Amy had set for the entire family. Royal confesses his past to Cecilia and tells her that he just wants his family back. Cecilia says their family is gone, even Amy. Royal shakes his head and says "No, she's not."

=== Season 2 (2024) ===
No. overall	No. in season	Title	Directed by	Written by	Original release date
9	1	"One Night in Wabang"	Gwyneth Horder-Payton	Cameron Litvack & Glenise Mullins	May 16, 2024
Royal Abbott grapples with Autumn's revelation about her true identity. Meanwhile, Joy intensifies her investigation into the strange occurrences in Wabang, leading to escalating tensions with the Tillersons.
10	2	"Traces to Somewhere"	Gwyneth Horder-Payton	Dagny Atencio Looper & Jenna Westover and Doug Petrie & Marilyn Thomas	May 16, 2024
Perry faces the consequences of his leap into the hole. Cecilia starts experiencing visions that reveal more about the mysterious land. Royal seeks to uncover the truth behind the time-warping properties of the hole.
11	3	"Everybody Hurts"	Deborah Kampmeier	Dagny Atencio Looper & Glenise Mullins	May 16, 2024
As the Abbott family reels from recent revelations, Joy's investigation brings more pressure. Perry's actions further complicate their situation, while Royal uncovers critical information about the hole's powers.
12	4	"Ode to Joy"	Blackhorse Lowe	Aïda Mashaka Croal & Randy Redroad	May 16, 2024
13	5	"All the World's a Stage"	Deborah Kampmeier	Doug Petrie & Randy Redroad	May 16, 2024
14	6	"Do-Si-Do"	Josh Brolin	Aïda Mashaka Croal & Marilyn Thomas	May 16, 2024
15	7	"The End of Innocence"	Catriona McKenzie	Cameron Litvack & Jenna Westover	May 16, 2024

== Release ==
A teaser trailer was released on March 9, 2022. The first two episodes of the eight-episode first season premiered on Prime Video on April 15, 2022, with two new episodes premiering each week.

The seven-episode second season was released on May 16, 2024.

== Reception ==
=== Critical response ===
Critical response of Outer Range
Season	Rotten Tomatoes	Metacritic
1	79% (53 reviews)	60 (23 reviews)
2	92% (24 reviews)	72 (9 reviews)

==== Season 1 ====
The first season was met with mixed-to-positive reviews from critics. On the review aggregator website Rotten Tomatoes, 79% of 53 critics' reviews are positive, with an average rating of 6.8/10. The website's consensus reads: "Outer Range's plethora of subplots threaten to get sucked into a wormhole of ponderousness, but at least this sci-fi Western is anything but plain." Metacritic, which uses a weighted average, assigned a score of 60 out of 100 based on 23 critics, indicating "mixed or average" reviews.

Ryan Britt of Inverse called the series "one of the boldest, weirdest, and most affecting sci-fi shows of the 21st century" and praised the performances of Josh Brolin, Imogen Poots and Tamara Podemski. The New York Post's Michael Starr wrote, "Outer Range a bit touch-and-go in terms of its interest factor but, then again, you'll want to know how it all turns out, thanks to the sci-fi twist that saves it from mediocrity." Robert Daniels of RogerEbert.com lauded Brolin, Poots and Lili Taylor's performances and said that the series is "the rare kind of genre-bending work that leaves one wounded in its fresh take on our human existence while offering untold possibilities." Katie Rife of Polygon commended the direction, performances (particularly Brolin and Poots), soundtrack, and musical score.

In a mixed review, Alison Foreman of The A.V. Club graded the series with a "C" and wrote, "Despite the promise of a stunning natural setting and a big ol' hole to throw things into, Watkins can't quite come into his own. Even as the soapy interpersonal stories ramp up, there's a nagging feeling Outer Range never goes far enough." Daniel Fienberg of The Hollywood Reporter criticized the writing and pacing, saying that "the most infuriating thing about Outer Range, and there are a lot of infuriating things about it, is how almost nobody on-screen is asking any of the questions that audiences will be asking. And, in its general lack of hole-directed inquisitiveness, the narrative progresses at a bizarrely glacial pace." Nonetheless, Fienberg praised the performances of Brolin, Podemski, Poots and Tom Pelphrey. Kristen Lopez of IndieWire criticized the writing and incoherent tone, while praising the performances of its cast. Lopez graded the series with a "D".

The season was named the 19th best TV show of 2022 by Inverse. TVLine labeled it as the "most underrated drama" of the year.

==== Season 2 ====
The second season received mostly positive critical reviews. On Rotten Tomatoes, it holds an approval rating of 92% based on 24 reviews, with an average rating of 7.2/10. The website's consensus reads: "With a better handle on its characters and a willingness to get even weirder, Outer Range's sophomore outing is in the zone." On Metacritic, it has a weighted average score of 72 out of 100 based on 9 critics, indicating "generally favorable" reviews.

Writing for The Wall Street Journal, John Anderson said "Audacity is what makes the show not just watchable but maybe even important: It isn't the singer, or the song, but the singer singing the song while plummeting through space and time." Bob Strauss of TheWrap considered it "an improvement over the intriguing but less textured first season". Gabriela Burgos Soler of Tell-Tale TV gave the season a rating of 4 out of 5 stars and wrote, "Outer Range delivered yet another thrilling season, managing to keep its rich world-building and complex characters." Ryan Britt of Inverse was also favorable with the season, calling it "one of the best sci-fi shows on TV" and lauding Brolin, Poots and Podemski's performances, though he felt disappointed that all seven episodes were released at once, opining that "this is a show you'll want to step away from after a few episodes, and then come back to and savor. If you do it all in a binge, [your] head might be spinning."

However, some critics were unimpressed, especially with the writing. Tom Philip of The A.V. Club graded it with a "C+" and said that "[the season] is unlikely to thrill all but the most devoted fans of its first outing. And while there's still a decent framework and a game set of actors, there's no escaping the reality that things will need to click fast if it has any hope of reaching its planned ending."
