= Pearson (TV series) =

2019 American political drama television series

- Genre: Political drama Legal drama
- Created by: Aaron Korsh; Daniel Arkin
- Starring: Gina Torres; Bethany Joy Lenz; Simon Kassianides; Eli Goree; Isabel Arraiza; Chantel Riley; Morgan Spector
- Composer: Christopher Tyng
- Country of origin: United States
- Original language: English
- No. of seasons: 1
- No. of episodes: 10

Production
- Executive producers: Gina Torres; Chris Downey; Kevin Bray; Gene Klein; David Bartis; Doug Liman; Daniel Arkin; Aaron Korsh
- Cinematography: Cort Fey
- Production companies: Untitled Korsh Company; Hypnotic Films & Television; Major Migraine, Inc.; Universal Content Productions; Open 4 Business Productions

Original release
- Network: USA Network
- Release: July 17 – September 18, 2019

Related
- Suits; Suits LA

Pearson is an American political drama television series created by Aaron Korsh and Daniel Arkin that premiered on USA Network. It is a spin-off of the show Suits and stars Gina Torres, who reprises her role of Jessica Pearson. It premiered on July 17, 2019. In October 2019, the series was canceled after one season. The series began streaming exclusively on Peacock on August 31, 2023.

== Premise ==
Pearson follows "powerhouse lawyer" Jessica Pearson, as she enters the dirty world of Chicago politics.

== Cast and characters ==
=== Main ===
- Gina Torres as Jessica Pearson
- Bethany Joy Lenz as Keri Allen
- Simon Kassianides as Nick D'Amato
- Eli Goree as Derrick Mayes
- Isabel Arraiza as Yoli Castillo
- Chantel Riley as Angela Cook
- Morgan Spector as Mayor Bobby Novak

=== Recurring ===
- D. B. Woodside as Jeff Malone
- Wayne Duvall as Pat McGann
- Juanita Jennings as Lillian Cook
- Betsy Brandt as Stephanie Novak

=== Special guest stars ===
- Gabriel Macht as Harvey Specter
- Rick Hoffman as Louis Litt

== Episodes ==
=== Backdoor pilot (2018) ===
For the backdoor pilot, "No. overall" and "No. in season" refer to the episode's place in the order of episodes of the parent series Suits.

No. overall	No. in season	Title	Directed by	Written by	Original release date	U.S. viewers (millions)
108	16	"Good-Bye"	Anton L. Cropper	Aaron Korsh & Daniel Arkin	April 25, 2018	1.07
Harvey is forced to help Jessica in Chicago, leaving Louis and Mike to deal with a lawsuit brought by former PSL partners and headed up by Stanley Gordon. In a bold move, Zane agrees to join Specter Litt as a name partner and bring enough of his senior partners to have a majority in any vote. Gordon then chooses to drop his suit, but claims they haven't seen the last of him. Jessica resolves her issues in Chicago by agreeing to work for the mayor. Harvey returns to New York in time for Mike and Rachel's wedding. Rachel learns that the offer to head up a victim-oriented legal firm in Seattle is real, causing her and Mike to move up their wedding date. Mike gives Harvey the news that he and Rachel are moving to Seattle.

=== Season (2019) ===
No.	Title	Directed by	Written by	Original release date	U.S. viewers (millions)
1	"The Alderman"	Kevin Bray	Daniel Arkin	July 17, 2019	0.57
Jessica Pearson makes waves on her first day as the right-hand fixer of Chicago's mayor. Pat is angry about Jessica’s new position, but Bobby sees it as keeping his enemies close. However, he got a bit more than he could handle with Jessica, who goes off-book while dealing with a hunger strike, a bus manufacturer and one of Bobby’s closest allies in the city council. In the process, she also angers Keri, who doesn’t take kindly to Jessica treating her like a lowly associate.
2	"The Superintendent"	Silver Tree	Jameal Turner	July 24, 2019	0.56
Lillian pays a visit to Jessica at her apartment and recognizes her dead neighbor in the crime scene photos. Jessica’s cousin, Angela is still not cool with her. Derrick and Mayor Bobby Golec are having trouble answering questions from the press. Nick rescues Jessica from a swarm of reporters. Following Pat McGann’s orders, he follows Jessica and drives towards her family’s home. While investigating her, Jessica also wants Nick to be her driver. The Press Secretary is trying to stop the tweet from going viral. Derrick wants Yoli to delete her tweet because she works for City Hall. When Yoli opposes him and decides not to, Derrick fires her. While arguing with her cousin, Jessica doesn’t realize someone is taking pictures of her.
3	"The Union Leader"	Stefan Schwartz	Sonay Hoffman	July 31, 2019	0.47
The Alderman post is up for grabs and Pat recommends Betsy Sullivan. This doesn't sit well with Jessica after she realizes Sullivan is not the right one to do the job. Meanwhile, things aren't too good for Keri after it dawns on her that her affair with Bobby is just pushing her down in life as Novak doesn't contribute much to the relationship. Nick has a tough time adjusting to Jessica as her new driver, but quickly learns her ways of working. In a bid to get an extension on the public housing development, Jessica is forced to blackmail the man entrusted with the job of razing down the public housing and that sees her breakdown after she's forced to do the task so she could save her cousin's family from becoming homeless.
4	"The Deputy Mayor"	Alexis Ostrander	Chris Downey	August 7, 2019	0.55
With Bobby taking some time off work to tend to his sick wife, Stephanie, Jessica concentrates on investigating Karl Jefferies murder, only to realize that Jefferies was just the start of even grittier and darker secrets. Investigating the murder throws out enough for Jessica to work with. She realizes that Jefferies was a man with shady connections and with some help from Keri, Nick, she learns of his murder at the hands of the dealers.
5	"The Former City Attorney"	Salli Richardson-Whitfield	Lauren Herstik	August 14, 2019	0.47
The former Attorney is trying to sue Chicago, Keri is the reason he was fired after she found that he was cheating people out of liabilities—sometimes children. Pat tells Bobby that he made a deal with his father to get rid of the Union boss and make Bobby Mayor. Jessica offers to do a trial deposition with Keri, but Jessica is too hot to handle, and Keri walks out. A drunk Keri tells Jessica later that evening that she’s afraid the jury will believe she became an attorney by sleeping with the man that became Mayor—and confesses to still sleeping with Bobby now. The flashbacks reveal that after sleeping with Keri, he put forward the complaint against the former city Attorney. Jessica rings Harvey and asks for help. Harvey manages to find a position in New York for the former attorney where he can build a new reputation, stopping him from putting a suit against Chicago. Jessica opens up to Nick.
6	"The Donor"	Mark Polish	Sylvia L. Jones	August 21, 2019	0.53
Jessica and Bobby discard Pat's campaign funding in search of a cleaner backer. On the sidelines, Jessica enjoys Jeff's company, but worries about her cousin Angela and her family’s inevitable eviction. Meanwhile, Derrick consoles Yoli who worries about her mothers fate. McGann prefers to keep his investors happy, so he disregards the deal he made with Jessica and has his crew set up for demolition. With that, the Cooks are now homeless. Jeff’s kind heart made him decide to talk to Angela and have them temporarily stay at the apartment.
7	"The Immigration Lawyer"	Emile Levisetti	Jameal Turner	August 28, 2019	0.44
Dark secrets are nearly in Jessica’s grasp. On the tape that was given to Bobby, you can hear Nick admit that Tommy is dead. Nick confronts Pat, seething from his blackmail. Bobby tries to show who is boss by doing a press conference on the new Ickaris deal, which will create more jobs. Jessica lurks in the background, knowing there’s a bigger secret between Pat, Nick and Bobby. A secret that even Keri does not know. It gets desperate as he loses his investment with the billionaire Albert Chan. Jessica wants Frank Cramer to take over the Ickaris project to make up for what she did to him, and in return, she wants to know about Tommy’s disappearance. Derrick speaks to Jessica about Frank Cramer and asks her to drop the deal because Bobby made a commitment to give a certain percentage of contracts to black business—a pledge that has not been delivered. Nick is frightened of the tape getting leaked so he confronts Pat and they have a fight, leaving Bobby no choice to suspend Nick without pay. Pat, now confident he has them both rattled, visits Bobby and threatens to use the tape. Pat wants the Ickaris project and demands that Bobby goes to Seattle to make that deal. This means Bobby cannot enjoy his time away in LA with Keri. Yoli deals with her personal situation. After sitting down with an immigration lawyer to help her mother, she realizes she has been conned. Derrick tells her to go to Jessica, or he will.
8	"The Political Wife"	Kevin Bray	Sonay Hoffman	September 4, 2019	0.51
Once Stephanie learns that Keri is going on the trip to the American Mayoral Summit, she becomes angry and is determined to do the speech in Bobby’s place. At the Summit, the tension is unbearable. Stephanie breaks while asking for help with the speech, and reveals she knew about her husband’s affair all along. Angela struggles with her night shifts and helping her neighbors with food. She rings Jessica, who is unfortunately too busy to help, and this sparks an emotional reaction from Angela, who decides she’s going to leave Jessica’s apartment. Yoli finally tells Jessica about her mother, who is being detained with ICE. Jessica wants to put media heat on the judge, but Derrick refuses. Keri confronts Stephanie. Jessica returns to her apartment to see everyone has gone.
9	"The Rival"	Mark Tonderai	Chris Downey	September 11, 2019	0.54
Bobby returns home exhausted as his wife admits to knowing of his affair with Keri. With the homeless camping outside of city hall, Angela doesn’t want Jessica coming in for the rescue. With Nick missing, Derrick argues Pat McGann is responsible for the protest. After meeting with her aunt, Jessica wonders what she can do to change Angela’s mind. While Keri is thinking about moving to another job, Yoli brings in business cards as a gift for taking on her mother’s case. With the demonstration going on outside city hall, Jessica and Bobby argue how to stop this firestorm. Jessica has to find a solution fast or Bobby will have to use force. Jessica is surprised when Keri offers to help with the homeless encampment and slash the budget. Derrick tries to protect the Mayor with the press hounding him about Ickaris. Jessica argues with Angela about signing the papers and ending the protests. On the news, Jessica and the Mayor watch as Salazar defends the homeless. Now that Angela isn’t the leader anymore, Jessica offers Salazar a seat at the council if he removes himself.
10	"The Fixer"	Kevin Bray	Daniel Arkin	September 18, 2019	0.49
Keri wants Jessica's help with Nick. Jessica is split between her personal and professional life as Angela continues her protest. Derrick wants more after the kiss he shared with Yoli. Bobby continues to try cling on to his authority—he delivers a speech on the Icarus project and leaves Pat out in the open. Jessica offers Angela the Alderman seat. Keri accepts a new job offer. Jessica returns home to find out that the FBI is monitoring them. Derrick has a blow-out argument with Bobby about the temporary housing promise. Stephanie serves Bobby divorce papers, but leaves him with a choice to make. Jessica meets Bobby while the FBI go to Keri’s apartment.

== Production ==
=== Development ===
On February 22, 2017, it was announced that USA Network was developing a spin-off series of their show Suits set to star Gina Torres as her character Jessica Pearson. The spin-off had been talked about for about a year and a half prior to the announcement. Meetings and negotiations were reportedly in the preliminary stages with no deals with cast and crew members yet in place. The series was expected to be written by Suits creator and showrunner, Aaron Korsh, who was also expected to executive and showrun the potential new series. Production companies involved with the potential series were expected to include Universal Cable Productions. On March 1, 2017, it was reported that Gina Torres had signed a deal to produce the series, based on an idea she pitched to Universal Cable Productions, alongside Aaron Korsh.

On August 16, 2017, it was announced that the season seven finale of Suits would serve as a backdoor pilot to the spin-off series. The episode was expected to be written by Aaron Korsh and Daniel Arkin, and be directed by Anton Cropper. Additionally, it was reported that executive producers for the new series would include Korsh, Arkin, Torres, Doug Liman, David Bartis, and Gene Klein. On March 8, 2018, it was reported that USA Network had given the production a series order. On May 14, 2018, Gina Torres announced at NBCUniversal's annual upfront presentation in New York City that the series would be titled Second City. On January 17, 2019, it was announced that the series had been retitled Pearson. On May 1, 2019, it was reported that the series would premiere on July 17, 2019. On November 1, 2019, the USA Network canceled the series after one season.

=== Casting ===
Alongside the report of her hiring as producer, it was confirmed in March 2017 that Gina Torres would officially star in the potential series. On November 10, 2017, it was announced that Rebecca Rittenhouse and Morgan Spector had joined the main cast of the series. On September 20, 2018, it was reported that Rittenhouse's role had been recast with Bethany Joy Lenz assuming the part. Additionally, it was further announced that Chantel Riley would reprise her guest role from the backdoor pilot in a series regular capacity and that Isabel Arraiza and Eli Goree had been cast in main roles as well.

=== Filming ===
Principal photography for the series commenced on September 20, 2018, in Los Angeles, California. Filming took place in Chicago, Illinois during the week of October 15, 2018 with locations including the Chicago Cultural Center, Grant Park, Chicago City Hall, Millennium Park, and The Loop.

== Reception ==
=== Critical response ===
On the review aggregation website Rotten Tomatoes, the series has an approval rating of 72% with an average rating of 6.92/10, based on 18 reviews. The website's critical consensus reads, "Though Pearson trades the juicy intrigue of Suits for straightforward political drama, it works thanks to Gina Torres's commanding performance." Metacritic, which uses a weighted average, assigned a score of 54 out of 100, based on 7 critics, indicating "mixed or average reviews".

=== Ratings ===
Viewership and ratings per episode of Pearson
No.	Title	Air date	Rating (18–49)	Viewers (millions)	DVR (18–49)	DVR viewers (millions)	Total (18–49)	Total viewers (millions)
1	"The Alderman"	July 17, 2019	0.1	0.57	0.2	0.78	0.3	1.35
2	"The Superintendent"	July 24, 2019	0.1	0.56	0.2	0.79	0.3	1.35
3	"The Union Leader"	July 31, 2019	0.1	0.47	0.2	0.79	0.3	1.26
4	"The Deputy Mayor"	August 7, 2019	0.1	0.55	0.2	0.85	0.3	1.40
5	"The Former City Attorney"	August 14, 2019	0.1	0.47	0.2	0.87	0.3	1.34
6	"The Donor"	August 21, 2019	0.1	0.53	TBD	TBD	TBD	TBD
7	"The Immigration Lawyer"	August 28, 2019	0.1	0.44	TBD	TBD	TBD	TBD
8	"The Political Wife"	September 4, 2019	0.1	0.51	TBD	TBD	TBD	TBD
9	"The Rival"	September 11, 2019	0.1	0.54	TBD	TBD	TBD	TBD
10	"The Fixer"	September 18, 2019	0.1	0.49	TBD	TBD	TBD	TBD
