= Isabel Arraiza =

Puerto Rican actress

- Born: Puerto Rico
- Occupation: Actress
- Years active: 2012–present

Isabel Arraiza is a Puerto Rican actress. She is best known for playing Lourdes in the crime drama series The Oath and Maria Olivares in the sci-fi drama series Outer Range.

== Early life ==
Arraiza was born in Puerto Rico. She left the island at a young age to attend theatre school in New York City. She is a graduate of the Juilliard School.

== Career ==
One of her first film roles was playing Marina in the thriller film American Dreamer. Her first big role came playing Lourdes in the crime drama series The Oath. She played Yoli Castillo in a recurring role in the political drama series Pearson. She starred in the crime thriller film The Little Things alongside Denzel Washington, Rami Malek, and Jared Leto. She played Maria Olivares, the love interest of Lewis Pullman, in the sci-fi series Outer Range.

== Filmography ==
=== Film ===
Year	Title	Role	Notes
2012	El Bloqueo	Friend	Short
2014	Más Que El Agua	Carol	
2018	Driven	Cristina DeLorean	
2018	American Dreamer	Marina	
2019	Campfire Alpha	Kim	Short
2021	The Little Things	Anna Baxter	
2021	Sonnets for an Old Century	Woman	
2023	Renata	Renata	Short
2024	Notice to Quit	Liz	

=== Television ===
Year	Title	Role	Notes
2018	Elementary	Lily Zavala	Episode: "The Geek Interpreter"
2018–2019	The Oath	Lourdes	15 episodes
2019	Pearson	Yoli Castillo	9 episodes
2020	Prodigal Son	Andi	Episode: "Internal Affairs"
2022–2024	Outer Range	Maria Olivares	13 episodes
2024	Accused	Melissa Conley	Episode: "Lorraine's Story"
