= Chantel Riley =

Canadian actress

- Born: 27 June 1986 (age 40); Toronto, Ontario
- Occupation: Actress

Chantel Riley (born 27 June 1986) is a Canadian actress.

Riley made her stage debut in 2011 playing the character of Nala in a German production of Disney's The Lion King in Hamburg. The following year she played the same character on Broadway.

A move into film followed and she made her debut in the Jesse Owens biopic Race. TV work includes the role of Kate in Wynonna Earp and the co-leading role of Trudy Clarke in Frankie Drake Mysteries. In 2019, she starred in the USA Network drama series Pearson.

She has also voice acted in the Assassin's Creed games, voicing Layla Hassan in Assassin's Creed Origins, Assassin's Creed Odyssey and Assassin's Creed: Valhalla.

In 2016, Riley was mentioned in an episode of Impractical Jokers where fictitious claims were made about her, including that she was "pulled from the rainforest", was "infected with a disease that killed half of Brazil", and made a song named "Fresh, Boom, Bap, Imma Touch It".

== Filmography ==
=== Film ===
Year	Title	Role	Notes
2015	A Teacher's Nightmare	Ms. Key	Short film
2016	Race	Quincella	
2016	Gaslight	Joanne	Short film
2022	Daniel's Gotta Die	Emily Montgomery	
2025	Ex Door Neighbor	Imani	Thriller, Drama, Romance

=== Television ===
Year	Title	Role	Notes
2017–2021	Frankie Drake Mysteries	Trudy Clarke	Main role
2018	Suits	Angela Cook	Episode: "Good-Bye"
2018–2020	Wynonna Earp	Kate	Recurring role, 9 episodes
2019	Pearson	Angela Cook	Main role
2019	Hudson and Rex	Mica Arora	Episode: "Rex Machina", S2, Ep11
2022–2023	Daniel Spellbound	Lucy Santana	Main role

=== Video games ===
Year	Title	Role	Notes
2017	Assassin's Creed Origins	Layla Hassan	
2018	Assassin's Creed Odyssey	Layla Hassan	
2020	Assassin's Creed Valhalla	Layla Hassan	
