= Daniel's Gotta Die =

2022 comedy film

- Film poster
- Directed by: Jeremy LaLonde
- Written by: Matthew Dressel
- Produced by: William G. Santor; Doug Murray; Nicholas Tabarrock; Leah Jaunzems
- Starring: Joel David Moore; Jason Jones; Mary Lynn Rajskub; Carly Chaikin; Chantel Riley; Iggy Pop; Bob Saget
- Cinematography: Robert Scarborough
- Edited by: Jeremy LaLonde
- Music by: Ian LeFeuvre; Stephen Krecklo
- Production companies: Darius Films; Productivity Media
- Release date: October 28, 2022 (Austin)
- Running time: 90 minutes
- Country: Canada
- Language: English

Daniel's Gotta Die is a 2022 Canadian comedy thriller film directed by Jeremy LaLonde and written by Matthew Dressel. The film stars Joel David Moore, Jason Jones, Mary Lynn Rajskub, Carly Chaikin, Chantel Riley, Iggy Pop, and Bob Saget. It is Saget's final film, released posthumously.

== Plot ==
Billionaire Edward Powell has several children - Daniel, Jessica and twins Victor and Mia. Victor is a cocaine addict, Mia is a mean boss and Jessica is a callous social media content creator, but Daniel is a good man working as a Chef and engaged to Emily. Edward on his deathbed tells Daniel to spend a weekend with the rest of the family at their beach house to get to know them better.

After Edward's funeral, his lawyer Lawrence reads out the will stating that Daniel collects all the inheritance and retains the option to share it with others. The rule is that all the family members must spend a weekend to get to know one another, and anyone who leaves without doing so will forfeit their share of inheritance.

The four siblings arrive at the family beach house in the Cayman Islands. Daniel brings his fiancée Emily, Jessica her mailman boyfriend Pierce, Mia arrives with her assistant Carter, and Victor comes alone. Lawrence points out that this not a vacation and that there are chores for everyone to do. He himself is awarded a grandfather clock as inheritance and angrily smashes it to the ground, whereupon it breaks and cash spills out of it. Jessica notices Lawrence with a load of cash and records him apparently stealing it, but he blackmails her with some past dirt and she is forced to let go.

Mia gives Victor a vial containing poison to drop into Daniel's wine, but Daniel drinks only a small amount and adds the wine to his pasta instead. Feeling a bit woozy from the poison, Daniel starts vomiting, so Emily drives out for some medicine. That night, Daniel is still unwell, but gets up to investigate why the garden door of his bedroom is wide open, when suddenly he is choked with a small towel by Pierce and passes out. Pierce opens a bag to bound and gag Daniel, but himself passes out on the bed. Meanwhile Victor uses a pillow and suffocates Pierce mistaking him for Daniel.

Daniel wakes up and tells Emily that he remembers napping and dreaming about a mailman, but later sees a bag with some tape and cutting tools and realizes that his dream was real, and that he was indeed going to be murdered. Victor and Mia call Daniel for tea, but he runs out screaming and frightened because he doesn't trust them anymore.

Jessica stumbles upon Pierce's dead body, and douses the house with gasoline, hoping to set it on fire. She also knocks out Lawrence and steals the cash from him, but is confronted by Mia and Daniel about the money. Daniel threatens to burn the cash and ties up all his siblings as well as Lawrence, but lets Carter go. He then proceeds to burn up much of the money and inheritance documents.

Emily arrives, and after Lawrence is freed and some cash is given to Carter, Daniel and Emily drive away. On their way out, they knock out a lamp that sets aflame the whole mansion, killing all three of his siblings.

== Cast ==
- Joel David Moore as Daniel Powell
- Jason Jones as Victor Powell
- Mary Lynn Rajskub as Mia Powell
- Carly Chaikin as Jessica Powell
- Chantel Riley as Emily Montgomery, Daniel's fiancée
- Iggy Pop as Edward Powell
- Bob Saget as Lawrence, Edward's lawyer
- Varun Saranga as Carter
- Dax Ravina as Pierce

== Production ==
The screenplay was originally titled Killing Daniel and written by Dressel in 2011. It was originally slated to enter production in 2015, with Bill Duke directing a primarily African-American cast, but was not completed at that time.

After LaLonde signed on as director, the film re-entered production in 2021, under the title Blue Iguana. Principal photography began on the island of Grand Cayman on March 8, 2021 and concluded on April 2, 2021.

== Release ==
Daniel's Gotta Die premiered at the Austin Film Festival on October 28, 2022.
