= Michael Zegen =

American actor

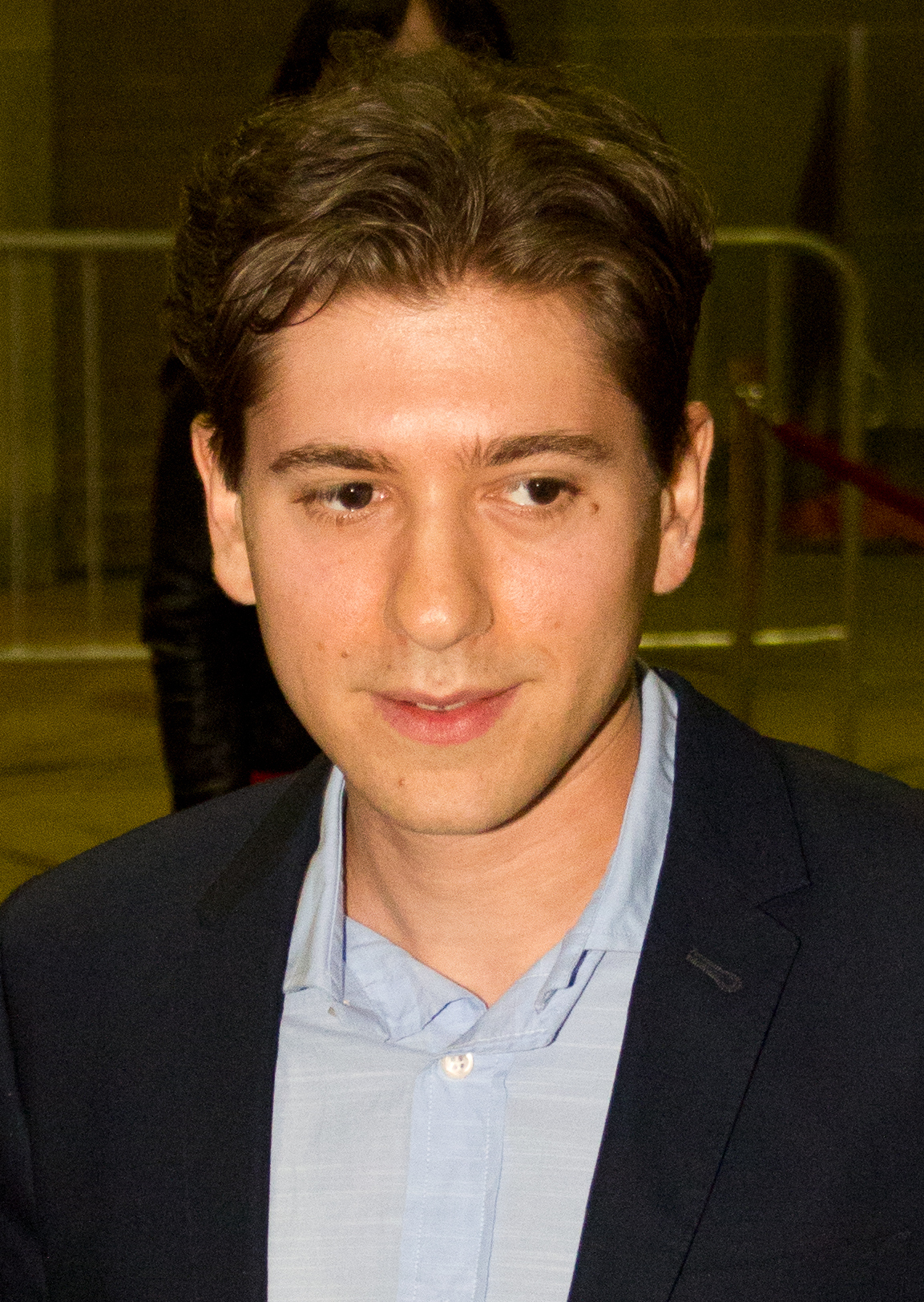
- Zegen at the 2012 Toronto International Film Festival
- Born: February 20, 1979 (age 47)
- Education: Ridgewood High School; Skidmore College
- Occupation: Actor
- Years active: 2002–present
- Spouse: Jennifer Damiano (m. 2025)
- Children: 1

Michael Zegen (born February 20, 1979) is an American actor. He is best known for his roles in the television series Rescue Me (2004–2011), Boardwalk Empire (2011–2014), and The Marvelous Mrs. Maisel (2017–2023).

== Personal life ==
Zegen was born to a teacher mother and a lawyer father, and lived in Glen Rock, New Jersey, before moving to nearby Ridgewood when he was five. He has two brothers. He is Jewish. His mother was born in Austria in a displaced persons' camp, and his maternal grandparents were Holocaust survivors from Ukraine and Poland. He attended Ridgewood High School, where he was active in the school's theater program. Zegen is a 2001 graduate of Skidmore College. Zegen married actress Jennifer Damiano in January 2025. The pair had met while starring in Bob & Carol & Ted & Alice off-Broadway in 2020. Their daughter, Oona Rose Zegen, was born on January 3, 2026.

== Career ==
His role on Rescue Me began as a recurring character in seasons 1–3, playing the nephew of series lead Tommy Gavin (Denis Leary). In seasons 5–6, he was promoted to the main cast when his character began probationary firefighter school to become a firefighter.

In 2010, Zegen was cast as gangster Bugsy Siegel for the second, third, and fifth seasons of the HBO series, Boardwalk Empire. In 2011, Zegen, along with James Ransone, was cast in supporting roles in the HBO comedy series How To Make It In America. In mid-2011, Zegen was cast in a recurring guest role in the second season of the AMC series The Walking Dead. In 2014 he created the role of Liam off-Broadway in the dark comedy Bad Jews. Zegen made his Broadway debut in A View from the Bridge in 2015. In 2017, Zegen played Joel Maisel in The Marvelous Mrs. Maisel. For the role he won two Outstanding Performance by an Ensemble in a Comedy Series awards from the Screen Actors Guild. He returned to Broadway in 2021 to star in Trouble in Mind by Alice Childress.

== Filmography ==
Film
Year	Title	Role	Notes
2005	Bittersweet Place	Todd	
2007	The Girl Next Door	Eddie	
2008	Assassination of a High School President	Steven Lohman	
2009	Adventureland	Eric	
2009	Taking Woodstock	Bernie (Young Man #1)	
2009	The Box	Garcin	
2012	Frances Ha	Benji	
2012	Ex-Girlfriends	The Blogger	
2015	Brooklyn	Maurizio	
2017	Becks	Pete	
2018	Tyrel	Eli	
2018	The Seagull	Mikhail	
2020	The Stand In	Steve	
2024	Notice to Quit	Andy Singer	
TBA	Thumb	TBA	Post-production

Television
Year	Title	Role	Notes
2004	The Sopranos	Partygoer	1 episode
2004–2011	Rescue Me	Damien Keefe	42 episodes
2006	Love Monkey	Luther	1 episode
2009	Mercy	Jason Keener	1 episode
2011	How to Make It in America	Andy Sussman	4 episodes (Season 2)
2011–2014	Boardwalk Empire	Ben Siegel	11 episodes (Seasons 2–3; 5)
2012	The Walking Dead	Randall Culver	4 episodes (Season 2)
2014	Girls	Joe	3 episodes (Season 3)
2015	The Good Wife	Justin Partridge	1 episode
2015	Happyish	Atomic Goldfarb	3 episodes
2016	BrainDead	Ben Valderrama	1 episode
2017–2023	The Marvelous Mrs. Maisel	Joel Maisel	43 episodes
2024	The Penguin	Alberto Falcone	3 episodes
2025	Too Much	Zev	8 episodes

== Awards and nominations ==
Award	Year	Work	Category	Result	Ref.
Screen Actors Guild Awards	2015	Boardwalk Empire	Outstanding Performance by an Ensemble in a Drama Series	Nominated	
Screen Actors Guild Awards	2019	The Marvelous Mrs Maisel	Outstanding Performance by an Ensemble in a Comedy Series	Won	
Screen Actors Guild Awards	2020	The Marvelous Mrs Maisel	Outstanding Performance by an Ensemble in a Comedy Series	Won	
Satellite Awards	2022	The Marvelous Mrs Maisel	Best Actor in a Supporting Role in a Series, Miniseries, Limited Series or Motion Picture Made for Television	Nominated	
