= List of Suits characters =

The main cast, from left to right: Rick Hoffman as Louis Litt, Gina Torres as Jessica Pearson, Gabriel Macht as Harvey Specter, Patrick J. Adams as Mike Ross, Meghan Markle as Rachel Zane, and Sarah Rafferty as Donna Paulsen.

Suits is an American legal drama, created by Aaron Korsh. It premiered on USA Network in June 2011. The series revolves around Harvey Specter (Gabriel Macht), a senior partner at a top law firm in Manhattan, and his recently hired associate attorney Mike Ross (Patrick J. Adams) as they hide the fact that Mike does not have a law degree. Each episode focuses on a single legal case and its challenges while examining the work environment of the firm, Mike's and Harvey's personal relationships, and problems stemming from Mike's lack of a degree. The rest of the starring cast portray other employees at the firm: Louis Litt (Rick Hoffman), a partner who manages the associates; Rachel Zane (Meghan Markle), a paralegal who develops feelings for Mike; Donna Paulsen (Sarah Rafferty), Harvey's long-time legal secretary, close friend, and confidante; and Jessica Pearson (Gina Torres), the co-founder and managing partner of the firm.

== Overview ==
Actor	Character	Seasons								
Actor	Character	1	2	3	4	5	6	7	8	9
Main cast
Rick Hoffman	Louis Litt	Main	Main	Main	Main	Main	Main	Main	Main	Main
Gabriel Macht	Harvey Specter	Main	Main	Main	Main	Main	Main	Main	Main	Main
Sarah Rafferty	Donna Paulsen	Main	Main	Main	Main	Main	Main	Main	Main	Main
Patrick J. Adams	Michael Ross	Main	Main	Main	Main	Main	Main	Main		Recurring
Meghan Markle	Rachel Zane	Main	Main	Main	Main	Main	Main	Main		
Gina Torres	Jessica Pearson	Main (Note: For season 7, she is only credited as a regular in the episodes she appears in.)	Main	Main	Main	Main	Main	Main		
Amanda Schull	Katrina Bennett		Recurring	Recurring	Recurring	Recurring	Recurring	Recurring	Main	Main
Dulé Hill	Alex Williams							Recurring	Main	Main
Katherine Heigl	Samantha Wheeler								Main	Main
Recurring characters
Vanessa Ray	Jenny Griffith	Recurring	Recurring							
Tom Lipinski	Trevor Evans	Recurring	Recurring	Guest (Note: Only appears in a flashback(s).)	Guest	Recurring				
Rebecca Schull	Edith Ross	Recurring	Recurring	Guest	Guest	Guest				
Ben Hollingsworth	Kyle Durant	Recurring								
Max Topplin	Harold Gunderson	Recurring	Recurring	Recurring		Guest				Guest
Pooch Hall	Jimmy Kirkwood	Recurring	Guest			Guest				
David Reale	Benjamin	Guest		Recurring		Recurring	Recurring			Recurring
Abigail Spencer	Dana Scott	Recurring	Recurring	Recurring	Guest	Guest		Guest	Guest	
Eric Close	Travis Tanner	Guest	Recurring	Guest	Guest	Guest				
Gary Cole	Cameron Dennis	Guest		Recurring			Guest		Guest	
David Costabile	Daniel Hardman		Recurring		Guest	Recurring			Recurring	
Rachael Harris	Sheila Sazs		Recurring	Recurring	Guest	Recurring		Recurring	Recurring	Recurring
Gina Holden	Monica Eton		Recurring							
Jacinda Barrett	Zoe Lawford		Recurring							
Wendell Pierce	Robert Zane		Recurring	Recurring	Recurring	Recurring	Recurring	Recurring	Recurring	Recurring
Conleth Hill	Edward Darby		Recurring	Recurring						
Adam Godley	Nigel Nesbitt		Guest	Recurring						
Michelle Fairley	Ava Hessington			Recurring						
Matthew MacFadzean	Nick Howell			Recurring						
Max Beesley	Stephen Huntley			Recurring						
Brandon Firla	Jonathan Sidwell			Recurring	Recurring	Recurring				
Željko Ivanek	Eric Woodall			Guest	Recurring					
Neal McDonough	Sean Cahill				Recurring		Recurring		Guest	Guest
Brendan Hines	Logan Sanders				Recurring					
D. B. Woodside	Jeff Malone				Recurring	Guest	Recurring	Guest	Guest	
Eric Roberts	Charles Forstman				Recurring	Guest				Guest
Peter Cambor	Nathan Krueger				Guest		Recurring	Recurring		
Aloma Wright	Gretchen Bodinski					Recurring	Recurring	Recurring	Recurring	Recurring
John Pyper-Ferguson	Jack Soloff					Recurring	Guest	Guest		
Amy Acker	Esther Litt					Recurring			Guest	Recurring
Christina Cole	Paula Agard					Recurring		Recurring		
Scott Michael Campbell	Father Walker					Recurring	Guest	Recurring		
Laura Allen, Brynn Thayer (Note: Portrayed by Allen in seasons 5 and 9, and by Thayer in seasons 6 to 8.)	Lily Specter					Recurring	Guest	Guest	Guest	Recurring
Paul Schulze	Frank Gallo						Recurring	Recurring		
Erik Palladino	Kevin Miller						Recurring		Guest	Guest
Ian Reed Kesler	Stu Buzzini						Recurring	Guest	Guest	
Carly Pope	Tara Messer						Recurring			
Jordan Johnson-Hinds	Oliver Grady						Recurring	Recurring		
Athena Karkanis	Marissa						Recurring			
Ray Proscia	Stan Lipschitz							Recurring	Recurring	Recurring
Jake Epstein	Brian Altman							Recurring	Recurring	Recurring
Denise Crosby	Faye Richardson									Recurring
Guest characters
Neil Brown Jr.	Clifford Danner	Guest	Guest	Guest						
John Billingsley	Stan Jacobson	Guest			Guest					
JR Bourne	Samuel Tull	Guest				Guest				
Titus Welliver	Dominic Barone	Guest				Guest				
Russell Hornsby	Quentin Sainz	Guest				Guest				
Rob Stewart	Tony Gionopoulos			Guest	Guest	Guest				
Patrick Fischler	Elliott Semple			Guest			Guest	—N/a	—N/a	—N/a
Troian Bellisario	Claire				Guest	Guest				
Tricia Helfer	Evan Smith				Guest	Guest				
Billy Miller	Marcus Specter				Guest	Guest	Guest		Guest	Guest
Scott Michael Campbell	Father Sam Walker					Guest	Guest	Guest		
Michael Reilly Burke	Teddy					Guest		Guest		
Usman Ally	Andrew Malick							Guest	Guest	Guest
Al Sapienza	Thomas Bratton							Guest	Guest	Guest
Jeffrey Nordling	Eric Kaldor								Guest	Guest

== Main characters ==
=== Harvey Specter ===
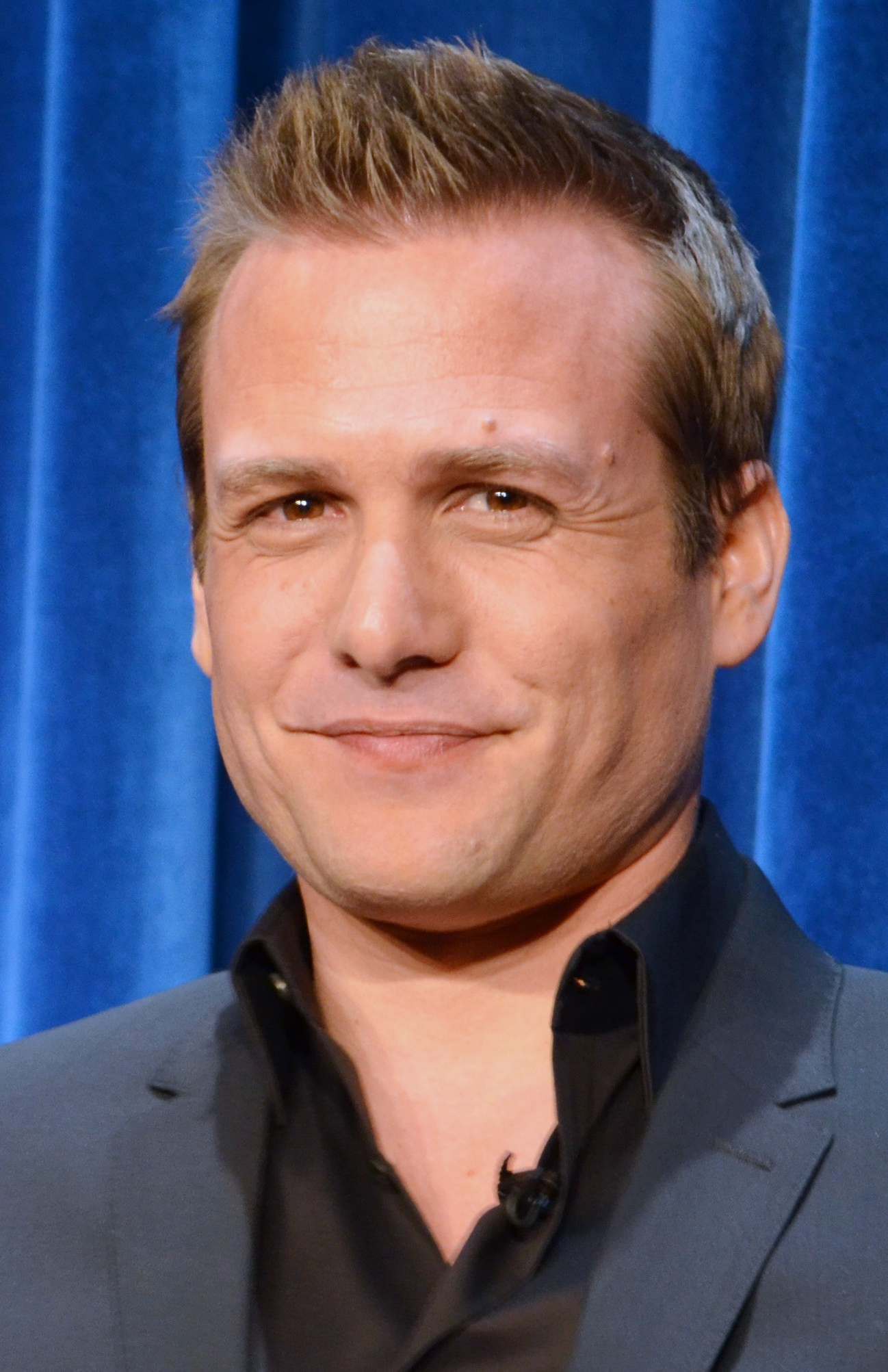
Gabriel Macht

Harvey Reginald Specter, played by Gabriel Macht, is a newly promoted senior partner at the prestigious New York law firm Pearson Hardman and is known as one of the city's top litigators. He was born and raised in Riverside, NY, the same town as fellow attorney Samantha Wheeler. In the pilot episode, he is told of his promotion to senior partner—the youngest to hold that position—and is forced to hire a Harvard Law School graduate to be his associate attorney. He is impressed with Mike Ross' quick thinking and drive to be a good lawyer, as well as his inherent ability to absorb enormous amounts of information (his photographic memory) and his extensive knowledge of law. Mike, however, does not have a law degree, but is hired anyway because Harvey does not want to waste time interviewing less-promising candidates. Mike reminds Harvey of a younger version of himself, and so they agree to conspire to pretend that Mike is a Harvard graduate. He acts as Mike's mentor, as well as his immediate superior: although he performs these roles somewhat reluctantly and emotionally distantly at first, he later begins to show that he does care about Mike and Mike's future as a lawyer.

Harvey began working in the mail room, went to New York University (NYU) for his undergraduate degree, and Jessica Pearson later paid for his tuition at Harvard Law, from which he graduated in 1997. Though years later Jessica muses to him that he did not take his studies seriously, he still graduated fifth in his class. Although he intended to start his law career at Gordon, Schmidt & Van Dyke (the Pearson Hardman firm's previous name), Jessica sent him to the New York County District Attorney's Office for mentoring and he worked as an assistant district attorney (ADA) under District Attorney Cameron Dennis (Gary Cole). While there, he met his legal secretary Donna Paulsen (at a bar), who became his close friend and confidante. After two years, he discovered a case with which Dennis was suppressing evidence, and rather than report it, Harvey abruptly left the DA's office despite being offered the position of head litigator, to go into private practice at Pearson Hardman. Five years before the events of the series Jessica Pearson informs him that she has discovered an embezzler in the firm and requests that Harvey discreetly investigate; in return, he requests a promotion to junior partner upon its successful completion. While Harvey initially believes the culprit to be Louis Litt whom he falsely accuses, with help from several other lawyers at the firm, including Louis Litt, Harvey discovers that the money is being embezzled by Daniel Hardman, the founding managing partner of the firm who was using Louis as a scapegoat. When Harvey discovers this, he insists that Jessica must report it to the DA; she refuses, choosing to instead confront Daniel, who claims the money is being used to fund his wife's cancer treatments. However, after further investigation, Harvey discovers that in reality the money is being used to finance an affair with a colleague, Monica Eton, whom Louis was also romantically interested in. Shortly afterwards, Harvey learns that his father Gordon succumbed to a myocardial infarction; though visibly devastated at this news, he mourns quietly, choosing to celebrate his promotion instead.

Harvey strongly prefers out-of-court settlements over going to court; Harvey's longstanding belief is that a courtroom has too many variables for him to be able to control, a tenet that was instilled into him by DA Cameron Dennis, his mentor. Despite the fact that Jessica Pearson, his immediate superior, is more cautious and favors lower risk over greater reward, Harvey often ignores her instructions, openly challenges her decisions, and generally does as he wants. While Harvey's methods often result in greater profit for the firm than Pearson's preferred strategy, his risk-taking tends to perpetuate her belief that he needs to remain on a leash. Harvey places his own interests above those of his colleagues, although his job performance always benefits his clients, and, by extension, Pearson Hardman and its employees. He dislikes pro bono publico cases, most likely due to their simplicity; generally, he will assign such cases to Mike Ross. On occasion, however, Harvey will waive his right to collect legal fees for less wealthy clients; in these cases, he insists that this be kept secret for the sake of his reputation.

He has a rivalry with Louis Litt that began when they were associates; though Harvey feels superior to Louis and often mocks him, he respects Louis, acknowledging his financial expertise and commitment to the firm, and considers him a skilled lawyer. This rivalry is later shown to be friendly most of the time; Louis characterizes it as similar to that between Ralph the Wolf and Sam the Sheepdog in the Looney Tunes cartoons. Louis, in turn, reluctantly realizes Harvey's value to the firm. In a season 2 episode, Louis (standing in for Travis Tanner) humiliates Donna on the witness stand in a preparatory mock trial, and Harvey confronts Louis afterwards, stating that Louis has taken their rivalry too far. Louis fires back that, although the experience pained him greatly, he did it to accurately portray the lengths Tanner would have gone to in court if the case had gone to trial.

Harvey performs his work with cold professionalism, rarely showing emotional attachment to his client. However, Harvey expresses a strong loyalty for those who have been loyal to him, such as Donna, his longtime secretary, Ray Benghazi, his driver, and (eventually) Mike Ross, his associate. When confronted about his emotional distance, he states that caring makes a person appear weak, and that a lawyer who shows feelings gets trampled. Because of this belief, he never shows any vulnerability, even to romantic interests. In season 5, Harvey starts having panic attacks as a consequence of Donna leaving him to work for Louis. He starts seeing a therapist.

Harvey has several female romantic interests, but he has trouble committing to a long-term relationship. He briefly dated former colleague Zoe Lawford before their relationship ended. He then attempted to have a real relationship with his Dana "Scottie" Scott in the second half of season 3, which was revealed to be a rekindling of a past relationship. But this ended in the season 3 finale when the two realized they could not handle the necessary separation between their personal and business lives. Later in season 7, he dated Doctor Paula Agard, his therapist but it ended later in the season when she gave him an ultimatum to choose between their relationship and working with Donna.

Since the very beginning, Harvey has been attached to Donna more than anyone else and they both have a very strong friendship and often portray romantic feelings for each other. She is his moral compass and the only person Harvey listens to. In the finale of season 8, Harvey is able to realise his feelings for Donna and they kiss with all their pent up feelings and emotions. The series ends with the pair getting married. In Suits LA it is revealed that Harvey and Donna have a son together.

He seems to have had a good relationship with his father Gordon Specter, a saxophone player; Gordon was immensely proud of Harvey, called him at work, and constantly wondered why his son had not been promoted to partner. It is insinuated by Travis Tanner that his mother (Lily Specter) was promiscuous, and Jessica's statements about Harvey's personality suggest his early life was emotionally damaging; Harvey later reveals in a conversation with Mike that Tanner's insinuations were true. Lily repeatedly cheated on Gordon Specter (James McCaffrey), and Harvey first witnessed this at young age, and again at the age of sixteen. He kept quiet about it so as not to distress his father but eventually told him. His mother then left them; and he held deep-rooted hatred for his mother for years but made amends with her in season 6 after Donna told him to. Harvey also has a younger brother (Marcus Specter); little else is known about his past or family.

Harvey is a car and sports enthusiast and was a star pitcher for his high school baseball team. However, a shoulder injury prevented him from pitching in the state championship; the team won without his help, a fact that has continued to haunt him. His office features an extensive vinyl record collection made up of albums from many prominent soul artists such as The Spinners, Charles Bradley and Lee Fields. His office also features a collection of signed basketballs and baseballs autographed by a variety of athletes including Kobe Bryant, Larry Bird and Patrick Ewing. Harvey is also shown to belong to a car club. He also loves Macallan single malt Scotch. He dated Elizabeth Hurley in 1998.

He constantly quotes movies, such as Top Gun, The Untouchables, The Breakfast Club, Fast Times at Ridgemont High, The Silence of the Lambs, and Highlander.

=== Mike Ross ===
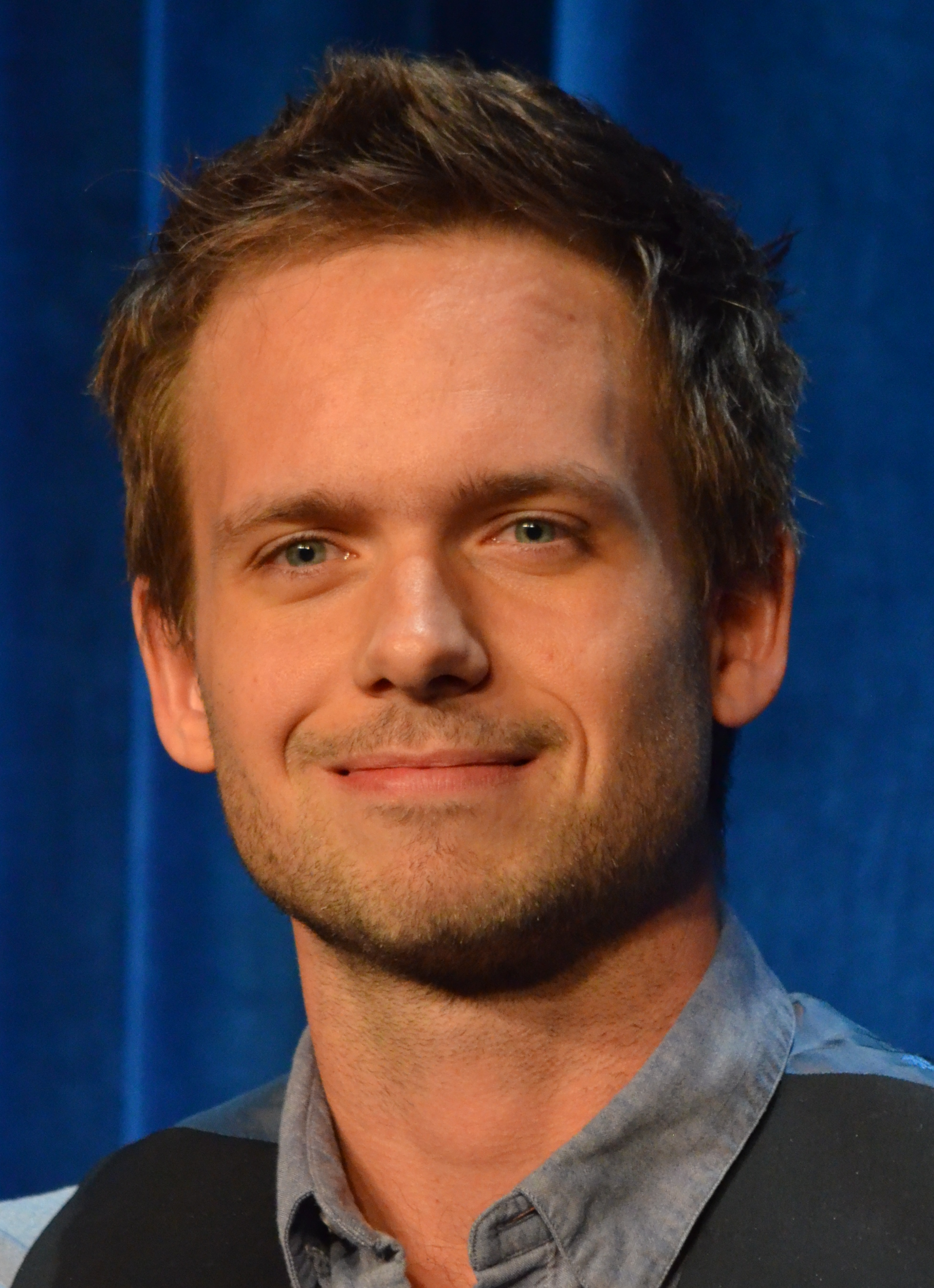
Patrick J. Adams

Michael James Ross, played by Patrick J. Adams, is a lawyer, with an eidetic memory and the ability to absorb large amounts of printed material very rapidly, who never attended law school. While in college, he aspired to be a lawyer and even passed the bar examination on a dare. However, he was expelled after his friend Trevor Evans convinced him to memorize a calculus test and sell it in order to pay off Trevor's debts to a drug dealer, and they unknowingly sold the answers to the Dean's daughter, forcing the dean to resign under scrutiny, but not before revoking Mike's scholarship and expelling him. Since then, he began smoking marijuana and took the LSAT as a proxy for others to pay the nursing home bills of his grandmother, who raised him after his parents died when he was eleven. To keep his grandmother in the private nursing home, he agrees to deliver marijuana for Trevor. However, he discovers that the delivery is a sting operation, because he read a novel in elementary school that matched the situation. He escapes the police by accidentally slipping into the hotel room where Harvey Specter's interviews for prospective associate attorneys is taking place. He impresses Harvey with his encyclopedic knowledge of law (which is even better than Harvey's) and drive to become a better lawyer than any graduate of Harvard Law School, the only school from which the Pearson Hardman law firm hires.

Harvey hires him and becomes his reluctant mentor, keeping Mike's lack of a law license a secret from everyone at the firm except Donna. Later, a hacker alters Harvard Law's records to show that Mike is a graduate. Mike often comes across as naive and initially has trouble adjusting to daily life as an attorney. He often gets emotionally involved with clients and even with some opponents, a trait both Harvey and Jessica Pearson view as weakness. Despite this, Mike does not want to be a cold-hearted and emotionally distant person like Harvey.

Mike has feelings for Trevor's girlfriend Jenny Griffith and is her boyfriend after she breaks up with Trevor. However, Jenny breaks up with him because Trevor told her about a voicemail Rachel left talking about their kiss and confronts him about his feelings for Rachel Zane. He does not want to base his relationship with Rachel on a lie, so he intends to tell her that he does not have a law degree. Harvey advises him against this, and since he does not want to base his relationship on a lie he breaks up with Rachel even though he does not want to. In season 2 episode 3 Mike needs a file from Rachel, and when he goes to collect it he sees that she is creating an online dating profile. She tells Mike that she has been working on the profile for 3 days, but yet the profile is still blank. Mike helps Rachel with the profile, describing her with a lot of superlatives, also saying that men will be standing line just because of her profile picture. Later that night Rachel visits Mike, because she does not understand why they cannot be in a relationship when it is obvious that they have feelings for each other. She finds out that Mike is keeping a secret from her, but he does not want to tell her what it is.

In the last episode of season 2, Mike does eventually tell her about his secret, but the timing is awful, as Rachel had just found out that she was denied admission to Harvard Law. She smacks Mike in the face a few times, but they end up having sex in the file room. Afterwards Rachel begins to distance herself from Mike, but Mike fights for her, and in the start of season 3, they get into a relationship.

Mike later takes a job as an investment banker to avoid having his fraud come back to haunt him, jeopardizing his future as well as Harvey's.

As season 4 begins, Mike gets his feet wet with his first case as an investment banker on a takeover with Gillis Industries. This puts him and Harvey at edge, seeing as how the other party working on the takeover is Logan Sanders, and he is represented by Harvey and Pearson Specter. Mike boldly goes head to head with Harvey, holding his own until finally succumbing when Louis undoes a deal Mike was working with Charles Forstman for money. As a direct result of the deal with Forstman, which Mike agreed to cut his boss Jonathan Sidwell out of, and which Forstman himself notified Sidwell, Mike was promptly fired, but gets offered a job by Forstman. Before taking a job with Charles Forstman, Louis Litt, guilty over his own deal with Forstman, uses a favor with Jessica to rehire Mike to Pearson Specter. His relationship with Rachel is tumultuous during this period, finding out that she had a history with Logan and also that she had kissed him while they were together. At first Mike had broken off their relationship following this betrayal. Mike tells Rachel that he needs time to think about things, and starts living in a hotel. Mike then relented, realizing he cared greatly for her, enough to overlook the incident and he moved back in after she approached him and convinced him to do so. For the remainder of the season, Mike is in the background, doing side work, and helping solve issues as Louis Litt's deal with Forstman falls apart. Mike, through his own compassion in the final summer episode of Suits, "This is Rome..." returns Louis's possessions to his house. When there, and attempting to comfort Louis, he asks about a key he found in Louis's box of things. At first, Louis takes it as playful and dismisses him. However, after Mike asks about the key again when he failed to get Louis hired with Robert Zane, Louis is able to piece together that Mike truly is not a Harvard graduate.

In season 5, Mike's secret is discovered and he accepts time in prison for 2 years after a long trial against Anita Gibbs, an attorney who makes sending him to jail her life's mission.

In season 6, Mike is able to cut down his prison time with the help of Harvey and works as a teacher at the church for a while before being reported by a student's parent. He then passes the bar with the help of Harvey and Jessica even though Anita Gibbs makes a full effort to stop him.

In season 7, he returns to the firm. In the last episode of season 7, Mike marries Rachel and they both leave the firm to run a legal clinic in Seattle.

Mike returns from Seattle in season 9 with a case that intersects with one of the firm's clients. The case ultimately leads to special master Faye Richardson firing Samantha Wheeler. In the series finale, Mike and Harvey devise a scheme to get Faye to leave.

=== Louis Litt ===
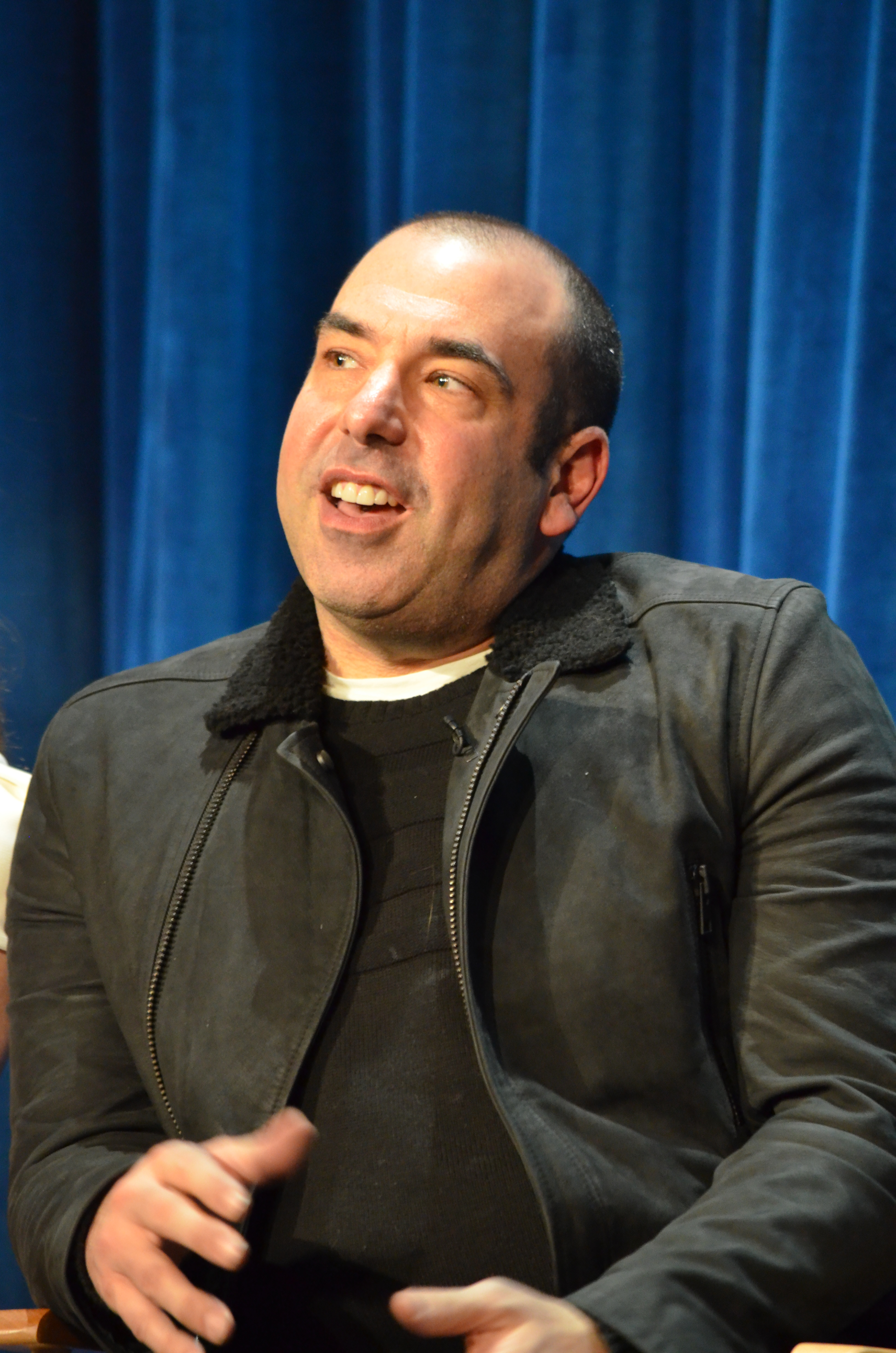
Rick Hoffman

Louis Marlowe Litt, played by Rick Hoffman, is a partner at Pearson Hardman (later Pearson Specter Litt) who is the firm's leading authority and expert on all financial matters and the direct supervisor of the firm's associate attorneys. He is self-serving and often bends rules to get what he wants, including faking a positive drug test to blackmail Mike Ross. He is overly pedantic, jealous to the point of paranoia, highly suspicious, snobbish, and cruel. Louis would be considered a "wanna be" person. Louis often fails to understand how he appears to others, honestly surprised to find people hold grudges over his behavior and that he can be hurtful. However, he highly values loyalty to his colleagues and the firm. Unlike Harvey, who is known to almost always prefer settlements to trials, Louis believes that trials are not necessarily a bad thing. He is known to be the firm's highest billing attorney in terms of hours, and has a strong work ethic, on one occasion proving it by finishing the associates' monthly work in a single evening. Louis has a love of Broadway, opera, ballet, origami, mudding, tennis, and recreational gun target practice. His address is 601 E 59th St., New York City.

He has a rivalry with Harvey Specter that began when they were associates. Louis is particularly jealous of Harvey's success and feels that his own contributions to the firm have been overlooked as a result. He was promoted to junior partner before Harvey was, but Harvey is promoted to senior partner first, a promotion Louis believes he should have received instead. Jessica tells him that she does appreciate his work and is able to trust him with cases that require her instructions to be carried out precisely and without question, something the brash, self-centered Harvey cannot be relied upon to do. Despite his animosity toward Harvey, Louis believes that Harvey is a great lawyer and does his best to help Harvey when the good of the firm is at stake. Harvey, in return, acknowledges Louis's value, financial expertise, and commitment to the firm, with Harvey himself expressing more than once that Louis is the firm's hardest-working attorney. Harvey confirms this again in the series finale while arguing about Louis with special master Faye Richardson, telling her that she took "the best lawyer in this firm" and stripped him of his dignity.

He has been rightfully suspicious of Mike Ross' status as a Harvard graduate since he was hired, especially when he found out that Mike does not have a file in the Harvard archive. When Harvey is accused of suppressing evidence, Louis is asked to stand-in for prosecutor (to-be) Travis Tanner in the mock trial. He uses the mock trial to confront Jessica about Harvey's better treatment.

In the season two episode "Sucker Punch", Louis has Mike hooked up to a lie detector (as a means of getting information about Harvey) and asks Mike where he attended law school. Mike answers that he has a diploma from Harvard Law School, which is an essentially true statement, and it seems to have eased Louis's suspicions. As of the season 2 episode "Asterisk," Louis has been promoted to senior partner by Daniel Hardman. He has the deciding vote in the firm's managing partner vote; though he is angry with Hardman for treating him poorly in the past, he is also angry with Jessica for the way she has constantly overlooked him in recent years. He ultimately votes in favor of Hardman which gives Jessica's position to Hardman by one vote, although this is short-lived.

After Hardman has been ousted once again and Jessica reinstated as managing partner, his relationship with Harvey is severely damaged, but Louis tries to move on. As a newly minted senior partner, Louis is entitled to hire a Harvard Law graduate as an associate attorney of his own. He becomes smitten with Maria (the secretary of her Harvard class and former US Supreme Court clerk) who accepts his offer; but by chance when she is introduced to Donna and it becomes clear that Mike's undercover status as a fraudulent HLS graduate could be put in jeopardy, Jessica is forced to order Louis to rescind the offer, leaving him angry and embittered.

Harvey's resentment and anger towards Louis does not die off. In the episode "Blood in the Water" after Hardman's dismissal, Harvey seethingly confronts Louis in his office and accuses him (falsely) of betrayal, leaking a list of the best Pearson Hardman associates to Alison Holt at Bratton Gould. Louis emphatically insists that he did not, which Harvey eventually accepts, but Harvey goes on to recite many of Louis's worst transgressions against himself and Jessica as reasons not to trust Louis whatsoever: bugging Harvey's office, leaking the CM lawsuit to Hardman (significantly damaging Jessica's already tenuous position as managing partner with Hardman back); spying on Mike's clandestine meeting with Monica Eton and telling Hardman; accepting Hardman's offer of a senior partnership, casting the swing vote for Hardman as managing partner, and once successful, sneaking into Harvey's office and searching it after hours for information to damage Harvey's credibility, and immediately instituting a new drug test policy for partners less than 12 hours later specifically (and solely) designed to force Harvey's resignation; all reasons to make Harvey tell him that for all intents and purposes (other than strict business required by Jessica) their relationship is finished and will never be repaired. The intensity of Harvey's confrontation leaves Louis seriously shaken, and, convinced he has no future at Pearson Hardman, approaches Alison Holt to inquire about moving to a position at Bratton Gould. He comes to Jessica (convinced that she sent Harvey to intimidate him into leaving) requesting her to waive the non-compete clause of his partner's agreement so he can join Bratton Gould; Jessica does as he asks, but reveals that Harvey's actions were not under her direction whatsoever and requests that he stay at Pearson Hardman. She also verbally acknowledges face-to-face (seriously and unprompted) for the first time that she was wrong, and (in contrast to her initial reaction in the episode "Asterisk") that Hardman's decision to grant Louis a senior partnership was indeed correct and well-deserved; Louis is visibly moved by this rare show of remorse (on Jessica's part). Despite this, Louis initially decided to submit his resignation regardless, but later changes his mind and decides to stay (Harvey also tore Louis' letter of resignation).

Starting off season 4, Louis is torn inside following the events of the previous season, and his former love Sheila seeming out of reach he dives into his work and into mild depression. Highly critical of his own actions, things are made more complicated by the introduction of Jeff Malone during "One-Two-Three Go…", prosecutor for the SEC comes to Pearson Specter. Louis, still unsure of what to do, goes to Donna for advice who tells him "to wait for Jessica to come to him" with a large offer. His associate Katrina, however, after seeing Jeff Malone's entrance tells Louis that if he waits, he may miss his chance, which he does. Things continue downhill for Louis, Malone being offered a senior partner position only worsens things as it was seen as an attempt to make himself obsolete. As friction between Louis and Jeff increase, Donna helps intervene on Louis's behalf, and convinces her to give Louis, the large coveted corner office to help soothe his ego, which it does. The friction, however, continues over into "Two in the Knees" as the firm becomes increasingly pressed by the SEC and Louis rebuffs Jeff's attempt to calm the waters during the broker investigation. Louis is heavily offended by Mike, when going into a courtroom right before their hearing, when Mike shows him doctored photos of his love Sheila, seemingly being engaged, which rattles him to the core. This, however, turns out to be fake and as revenge, in "Leverage" Louis goes above Mike's head to prevent him from getting much-needed investment funds from Tony Gianopolous in the takeover war that Mike is waging with Pearson Specter over Gillis Industries. Louis attempts to patch his relationship in several episodes, failing miserably and actually putting Harvey at arm's length. Defeated, and intent on proving his worth to his friend, Jessica provides him that opportunity when she offers him a chance to invalidate the sale of Wexler stocks so that the firm never bought them and prevent the SEC from being able to scrutinize the firm further. Louis finds a loophole, and instead of waiting for Jessica's approval or consulting Harvey, he unwinds the sale and puts the deal, which at that moment takes Harvey off his feet as he was just using those shares of Wexler to try and leverage a deal with Forstman, who had as a result of Louis's actions purchased them already on the open market.

Louis, feeling bad and guilty for betraying Harvey, albeit without knowing it, is intent on fixing the problem. Going to Forstman, Louis makes a deal with Forstman to sell the shares to Logan Sanders, Harvey's former client through the Gillis takeover arc. Only after this does Louis confide in Katrina that in order to do the deal, he had to funnel money through offshore accounts, which amounted to Tax Evasion, which is illegal. While impressing Harvey, the sale wracks on Louis's nerves as he frantically searches for a way to undo the deal when Forstman then seals him into it, by forcing Louis to take a payoff as "incentive" to not rat him out or turn on him over the deal.

Louis, still enraged from his Forstman deal and seemingly at his own pity, is offered a reward from Jessica for his save-the-day move. Originally, he chooses that he wants to finally be named partner in the firm, which Jessica says is still off the table. He then chooses to get more vacation and work-from-home time, giving him an opportunity to fix things with Sheila. However, after encountering Mike on his way to take a job with Forstman which Louis interrupts, he instead uses his reward from Jessica to rehire Mike and prevent him from taking a job with Forstman.

Hoping the Gillis deal is behind them, Louis buries his fee receipt deep in the Gillis files, but then is immediately dismayed when Mike informs him of Sean Cahill's attempt from the SEC to get the Gillis takeover files. This panics Louis as Mike proposes to turn over all Gillis files to get the SEC off their backs. Louis desperately tries to get Forstman to undo their deal, but Forstman will only agree if he can get Harvey involved in a similar deal. As Louis is there, Harvey and Mike both figure out what Louis is doing and try to find him, but in their effort, Louis has already gone to Jessica and explained what he did. As Harvey arrives she fills him in, and expresses her discontent and promises to fire Louis after the deals are done.

Louis then goes to the SEC the next day and confesses in-person to Cahill, but unable to reach him, speaking to Woodall first. He is quickly rushed from the building and told by Woodall that the SEC is "only going after the big fish" and is not interested in his confession. Louis, perplexed, returned to the office and the next morning, realizes that the reason for this is that Woodall must have made a similar deal with Forstman in the past, which if the SEC were to begin investigations on, would find that Woodall had taken money from Forstman. Louis, knowing that Jessica intends to fire him but still wanting to help, tags along with Mike and Harvey as they convince to Sean Cahill that instead of coming to Pearson Specter, that he should focus his attention on his own boss for malicious prosecution. They offer up Woodall, who plays right into their hand by denying access to his bank records.

After returning to the firm, Louis leaves his resignation in "Gone" before Jessica has the chance to fire him. "This Is Rome" starts with Louis coming to Harvey and asking for three of his own clients to start looking for other work in the city, but because of the company by-laws, he cannot take them without Jessica's approval. Louis is then given a job opportunity in Boston via Harvey, where Sheila also works. Happy and trusting, Louis goes to Sheila who quickly rebuffs his love advances as not genuine, and she dismisses him. Determined to help Louis, Mike gets him an interview with Robert Zane, Rachel's father. Zane is impressed with Louis's billables at Pearson Specter, but insists that Louis must steal ONE client from Harvey to get hired. Acting on a tip from Katrina, his former associate, Louis steals Versalife, a client that Harvey would possibly have to drop due to antitrust complications. Harvey, however, with Mike's assistance, approaches Walter Gillis and convinces him to buy a division of Versalife, thus getting Pearson Specter under the antitrust threshold. Mike returns the contents of Louis's office to him and attempts to console him. In doing so, Mike drops a clue that accidentally gives away his secret about never attending Harvard. Mike asks about a key in Louis's box several times. Louis then explains the significance of the key, that it is an item given to Harvard graduates of the Order of the Coif. After Mike leaves, Louis deduces that Mike, as a magna cum laude graduate of Harvard Law, should have known about the key. (The key is fictional; Harvard Law School does not have a chapter of Order of the Coif.)

Taking his allegations to Jessica in the final scenes of "This Is Rome", Louis angrily gets her to admit to being a liar and a hypocrite with regard to Mike. He demands to be named partner, and in a tense standoff, stammers out the name "Pearson-Specter-LITT!" After being named partner, Louis changes considerably and though fidgeting now and then, he stands by the firm and his partners. He has been engaged to Sheila Sazs and Tara Messer in the past and failed both relationships. In season 7, Sheila walks back into Louis's life and they both decide to be together. In the series finale they get married and Sheila gives birth to their daughter, Lucy Litt.

=== Rachel Zane ===
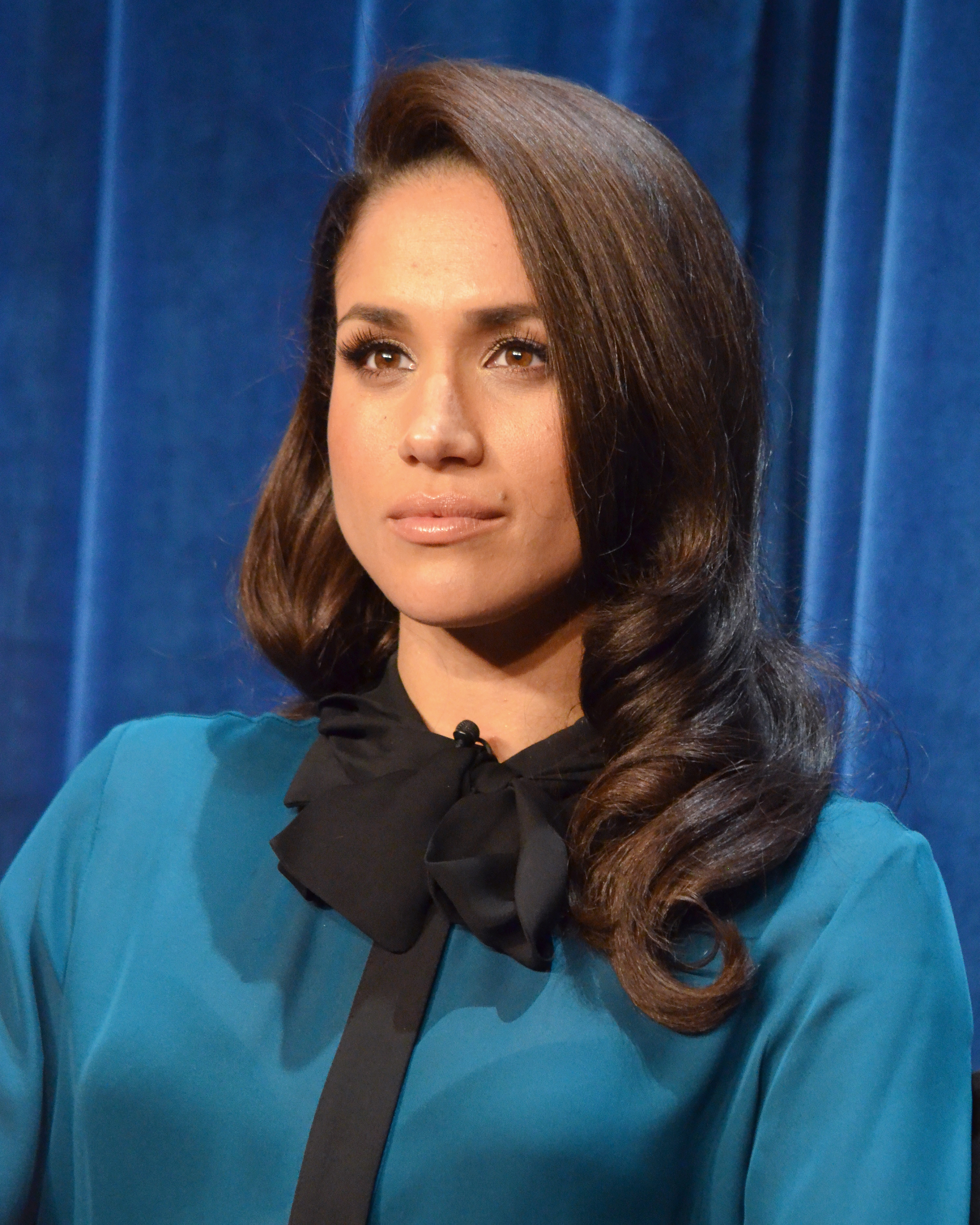
Meghan Markle

Rachel Elizabeth Zane, played by Meghan Markle, is a paralegal who has worked at Pearson Hardman for several years. She is at first Mike Ross' friend, and she later develops romantic feelings for him. She aspires to be an attorney, but suffers from test anxiety and cannot score well enough on the LSAT. Mike tries to help her score higher on the LSAT, but she learns that he used to take tests for others when she inadvertently tries to hire him to take the test for her.

Late in season 1, she kisses Mike, leaving him confused about his feelings for her. Louis Litt inadvertently witnesses the kiss and warns Jenny, Mike’s girlfriend, about Mike and Rachel. Jenny then proposes to Mike that they go out on a double date with Rachel and her boyfriend (which she does not have, so she chooses Kyle to go on the double date). While on the double date, Kyle touches Rachel in a manner she does not like, which upsets Mike, saying "she does not like it". This upsets Jenny, who says "She is not your date".

Rachel later leaves Mike a voicemail telling him that she cannot stop thinking about their kiss, which he does not hear for a while. However, Jenny learns about the voicemail through Trevor. Jenny then breaks up with Mike, saying that she "hopes he and Rachel are happy together". Mike finally hears Rachel's message, and kisses her, telling her "I got your message". This prompts the pair to begin a relationship, which they decide to keep a secret. However, the relationship ends before it starts because Mike does not want to lie to Rachel, but Harvey and Donna insist that he can not tell her the truth, which leads to Mike breaking up with Rachel.

Rachel’s father, Robert Zane, is a name partner at Rand Kaldor Zane, a fact she does not want people to know. Her family is wealthy, but she lives on her own income to prove a point to her father, who always wanted a son and has told her multiple times that she should consider another career. She is a foodie and loves ballet. However, she stuns Mike with the revelation that she has not seen classic movies like Casablanca or Citizen Kane, dismissing them as "old."

In season 2 episode 3, Rachel is seen taking the LSAT after work. Rachel eventually gets a 172 on her LSAT, passing the criteria to gain admission into Harvard Law. It is revealed late in season 2 that, despite her score and being a legacy via her father, she does not rate highly enough among all the applicants to get into the next semester's Harvard Law class. Louis discovers this and, to spare Rachel's feelings, blames it on his affair with Sheila Sazs going badly. In episode 10 of season 2, Mike finds out the real reason Daniel Hardman returned to the firm and excitedly kisses Rachel. However, she stops it saying they cannot happen like this, because Mike's grandmother has just died, and when things like that happen people do not make smart decisions. Mike tells her that being smart has not made any of them happy. Rachel then decides to visit Mike, telling him he is right and that she does not want to make the smart choice. However, after seeing Tess, the married woman Mike has been hooking up with, naked, Rachel becomes upset with Mike.

In the last episode of season 2, Rachel finds out about Mike's secret, and they end up having sex in the file room. After this, Rachel tries to move on from Mike, but Mike fights for her, and in the start of season 3 they begin dating. Neither Mike or Rachel is good friends with Katrina Bennett, due to her mistreatment of anybody whose rank is lower than hers. Rachel becomes jealous after Mike and Katrina become friends after working on a case. Mike then tells Rachel that he has trusted her with his secret and his life, which ultimately leads to him telling her that he loves her. They then share a passionate kiss.

The season 3 episode "She's Mine" reveals that Rachel has been admitted into Columbia Law School. Two episodes later, she learns she was also accepted into Stanford Law School, much to the chagrin of Mike, who does not want her to move 3,000 miles away. She finally decides to attend Columbia Law School to stay close to Mike and also work as a part-time associate at the firm. Mike and Rachel also move in together right after she informs Mike of her choice.

In season 4, Rachel replaces Mike as Harvey's associate, but is often snubbed and mistreated by him, unlike Mike. Harvey is involved in maintaining Logan Sanders’ company. It is revealed that Rachel and Logan had an affair whilst Logan was married. After a series of events, Rachel and Logan share a passionate kiss, which makes her feel guilty. After some time, she confesses to Mike, who is hurt and leaves her for a while to live in a hotel. Rachel has a hard time readjusting to Mike working at the firm again due to her strong desire to express affection towards him. However, Mike has asked for space, which is hard for Rachel to give him. She even lies to Mike, telling him that Harvey has assigned her the same case as him. She later visits Mike at his hotel room, telling him that she wants him to decide if he loves her more than he hates what she did. Despite Mike not being completely over it, they eventually get back together.

At the end of season 4, Mike proposes to Rachel, and she accepts. In season five, Rachel continually struggles to keep Mike's secret from her parents. When Mike's former love interest Claire turns out to be the opposing counsel on Mike's first case as a junior partner, Rachel handles the entire case on Mike's behalf. Rachel tells Mike that she has a problem with Claire, because she can see why Mike was interested in her. In their last meeting, Claire finds out that Mike is not a real lawyer, and Rachel ultimately has to beg Claire to keep Mike's secret. Mike finds out that Claire knows and locates her. Claire then tells Mike that if he really loved Rachel, he will not marry her. Mike is scared about him dragging Rachel into something that could ruin her life, but Rachel tells him that she does not care and wants to marry him.

When Mike gets arrested, Anita Gibbs tries to get Rachel to testify against Mike and Harvey by using her contacts with Rachel's professor, threatening her entire career. When Mike decides to settle with Anita Gibbs, he decides to marry Rachel; however, he changes his decision at the last moment out of guilt, leaving her in her wedding dress. In season six, Rachel's abilities as a lawyer are put to test when she handles an innocence project and, against all odds, saves Leonard Bailey from getting executed for a crime that he did not commit. Later, she is given assurance by Louis that she will be admitted as a second year associate after her graduation. However, her career is once again threatened when, in midst of a plan to get Harvey's help, an ethics board member refuses her the opportunity to pass the bar, although Harvey later saves her. She also constantly supports Louis through his tempestuous relationship with Tara and is the only one holding him through his trauma when it ends.

Throughout season 5 and 6, Rachel goes through a difficult time due to Mike being in jail and puts all her effort into helping him. In season 7, the pair decide to get married and move to Seattle to run a legal clinic together. Their wedding takes place during the season’s finale.

=== Donna Paulsen ===
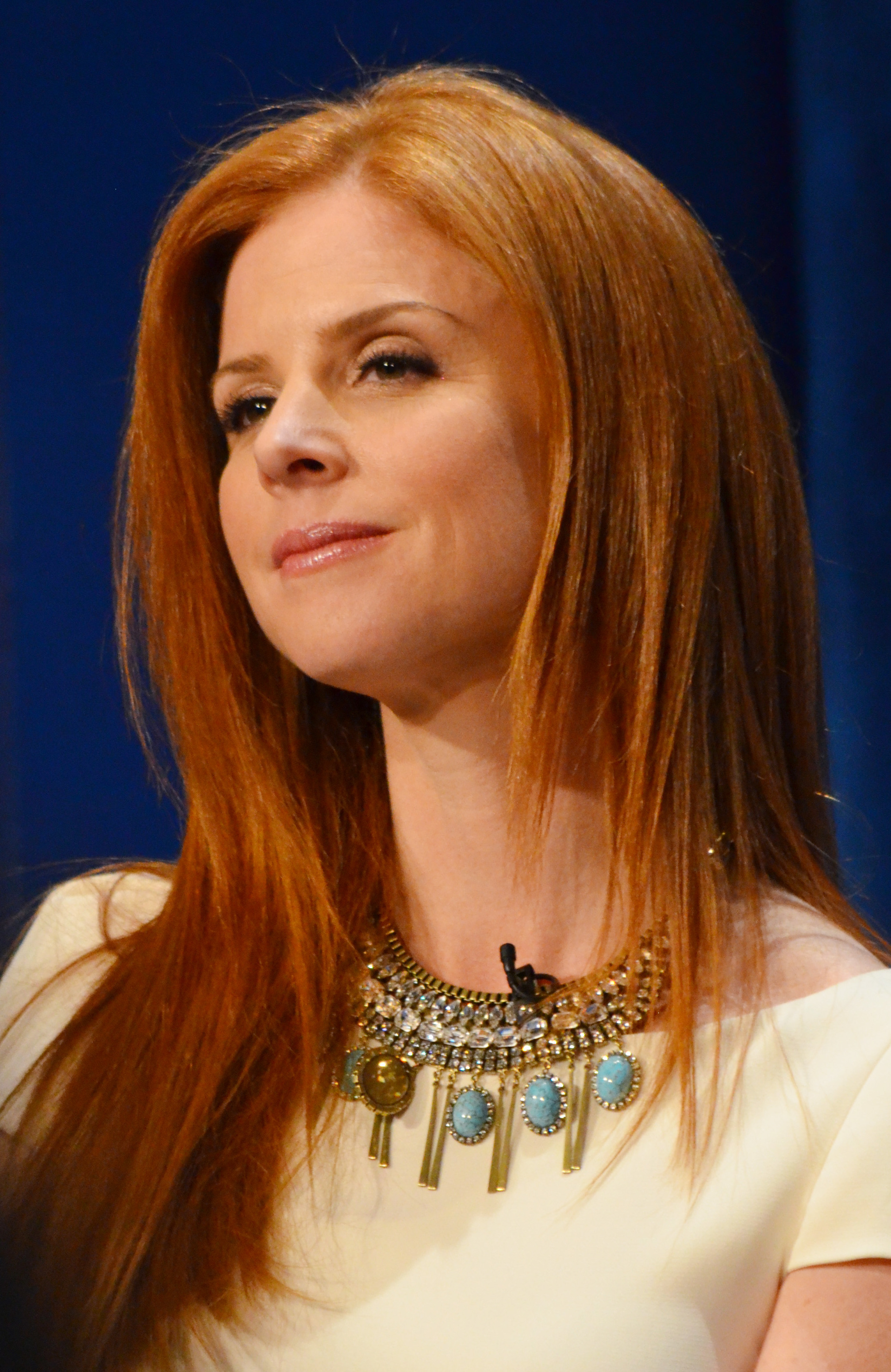
Sarah Rafferty

Donna Roberta Paulsen, played by Sarah Rafferty, is Harvey Specter's legal secretary, close friend, and confidant. She has worked with him since his first year as an Assistant District Attorney, and she left the DA's office with him to work with him at Pearson Hardman. She listens in on all the conversations in his office, partially because he never turns the intercom off. She knows the private details of his personal life and relationships. She is also an integral part of Harvey's pre-trial ritual. She was promoted to the post of Chief Operating Officer of the firm in season 7.

Donna, like Harvey, is brashly confident and self-assured, but unlike Harvey, she is able to understand her own feelings well and intuitively understand the feelings of others around her and how those people's feelings are reflected through their corresponding actions. She often explains Harvey's feelings to him when he is on the verge of making a gut decision with significant potential for future repercussions for him or his relationships with his clients or co-workers. She often also takes pride at knowing things before Harvey asks for them, and is usually able to out-think everyone, except for Harvey, who is usually able to quickly discern when Donna has an ulterior motive and makes a point of calling her out on it, despite her efforts to prevent him from doing so.

Donna is considered the best legal secretary in New York City, and she carries enough power in the firm to intimidate senior partner Louis Litt, especially since she remembers most of Louis's indiscretions. Mike Ross often comes to her when he thinks he needs help, and she mocks him because he does not really need help; when Mike actually needs help, she provides all the assistance she can. She often jokes that she knows everything, and she is witty and has a sardonic sense of humor. Whenever she solves a seemingly impossible problem for Harvey, Louis or Mike, they inevitably ask how she did it and she often gives the simple response, "I'm Donna."

Donna is friends with Rachel Zane. During a conversation with Mike in season 2, it is implied that Donna once had romantic feelings for Harvey. In an earlier conversation with Rachel, she says that she was never romantically involved with Harvey because if the relationship did not work out, she could not continue working for him. However, it is revealed that she once had a boyfriend who broke up with her because she placed her working relationship with Harvey over her romantic relationship with her boyfriend. When she learns that Harvey believes she loves him, she tells him that despite what she once told him, she loves him "like a brother or a cousin."

In the season 2 episode "Break Point", Donna found that she signed in an allegedly buried document and then lost it. When she finds it, she succumbs to pressure from outside counsel and illegally destroys it, exposing and causing trouble for the firm; She is soon after fired by Jessica Pearson for her actions. Afterwards, Donna is furious with Harvey because he did not fight aggressively for her job, did not fire her himself, and never personally called her. She hires her own attorney and intends to plead the Fifth in the trial. She refuses to participate in the mock trial, even though Harvey asks her in person. Mike eventually convinces her, but she declines to answer any questions as she intended. Louis, playing the part of prosecutor, asks her if she loves Harvey. She tries to say that she cannot answer with a simple yes or no, but Louis aggressively pursues a simple answer. When Harvey comes to her defense and ends the questioning, she leaves without a word and is later furious with Mike for not anticipating that Louis would ask such a question. At the end of the episode "High Noon", when it is revealed that Hardman forged and planted the document that Donna allegedly signed, Harvey resolves to get Donna her job back. Though she is initially upset with Harvey for defending her against Louis and letting Louis believe she loves Harvey, she returns to the firm after Harvey admits he needs her.

In season 3, Donna begins a romantic relationship with Darby's fixer, Stephen Huntley. The morning after their first date, she goes to the copy room to flirt with Stephen, leaving Harvey to ask where she was upon her returning to her desk. Not wanting to tell Harvey about her and Stephen dating, she simply says she was helping Stephen with some copying, leaving Harvey to sternly remind her, "You work for me."

In the fifth episode of the third season, when Donna tells Harvey that she is sleeping with Stephen; though visibly a bit uneasy, he responds that it is ultimately a matter of indifference to him, so long as Donna keeps it fully separate from her life and work in the office, where she is responsible only to him, to which she fully agrees. Later though, in the season 3 episode "The Other Time", Harvey admits that her relationship with Stephen does aggravate him.

In the sixth episode of the third season, it is revealed that Harvey and Donna slept together once when he quit the DA's office 10 years ago, since Donna had told him she does not date people she works with and they did not work together any longer (for the time being). When Harvey was promoted at Pearson Hardman, he tells her he needs her there and that he does not want to be a lawyer without her. She decides to accept his offer to be his secretary and they both agree that they will forget their night together, and from there starts the mysterious can-opener tradition.

After remembering all they have been through, Harvey admits to Donna that her relationship with Stephen does bother him but implies that it does not mean he wants her for himself. She tells him she knows and says, "This is exactly why I had that policy." When he asks her why she changed it for Stephen, she replies, "Because I have to live my life, Harvey."

In season 4, Donna falls into significant legal jeopardy when she illegally acquires evidence from Mike and it forces Harvey and her to put the problem of defining their relationship under a microscope. Harvey has often said that he loves her, but it often leaves Donna perplexed and upset with Harvey, who is unwilling to outwardly move past it strictly platonic emotion and show a romantic interest because of the vulnerabilities it would force him to be exposed to. Donna eventually realizes that she cannot deal with this never-ending lack of definition to their relationship, and decides to leave Harvey to go to work for Louis, whose previous secretary had just died in the season finale. Season 5 starts where the previous one leaves off, with Harvey feeling gutted and abandoned. He angrily rebuffs her offer of a standard 2-week transitional period to look for a replacement.

In season 6, Donna works with office IT guy Benjamin to develop a digital personal assistant featuring her quips and advice. While their efforts to market the device are frustrating and ultimately fail, the experience inspires Donna to want more out of her life, but she is not exactly sure what. In season 7, she demands that Harvey give her a "seat at the table" as a senior partner. Harvey initially agrees, but later says it will not work because it dilutes what it means to be a senior partner at the firm. Donna agrees but now has a new demand: she wants to be Chief Operating Officer (COO). During the season, Donna becomes jealous of Harvey's growing romantic relationship with his therapist Doctor Paula Agard as her unresolved feelings for Harvey bubble back up to the surface. In season 7, episode 10 "Donna", she kisses Harvey unexpectedly after having conversations with Mike and Louis. She later apologizes for it, but this leads to Harvey admitting to Paula not only about the kiss but also that he had slept with Donna in the past, causing a rough patch between the two. Donna also resigns from the firm when Paula gives him an ultimatum to choose between working with Donna and his relationship but Harvey brings her back by breaking up with Paula and choosing her.

In season 8, she starts dating Louis's client, Thomas Kessler. Harvey breaks privilege by telling Donna that a deal Thomas has been given by Harvey's client is merely a ruse to use him as a stalking horse. Donna ultimately tells Thomas, ultimately resulting in Harvey and Donna fighting about the latter losing faith in the former. While Harvey has been summoned for questioning with the ethics committee, he tells Thomas to not throw Donna under the bus and blame him completely. Donna does not show up to the hearing despite being summoned, making Harvey realise that she is the one he wants to be with and he runs to her apartment and they passionately kiss.

In season 9, Donna and Harvey married in the last episode of the series. After their wedding, Donna and Harvey tell Louis they would be leaving SLW and moving to Seattle to work with Mike Ross and Rachel Zane Ross.

=== Jessica Pearson ===
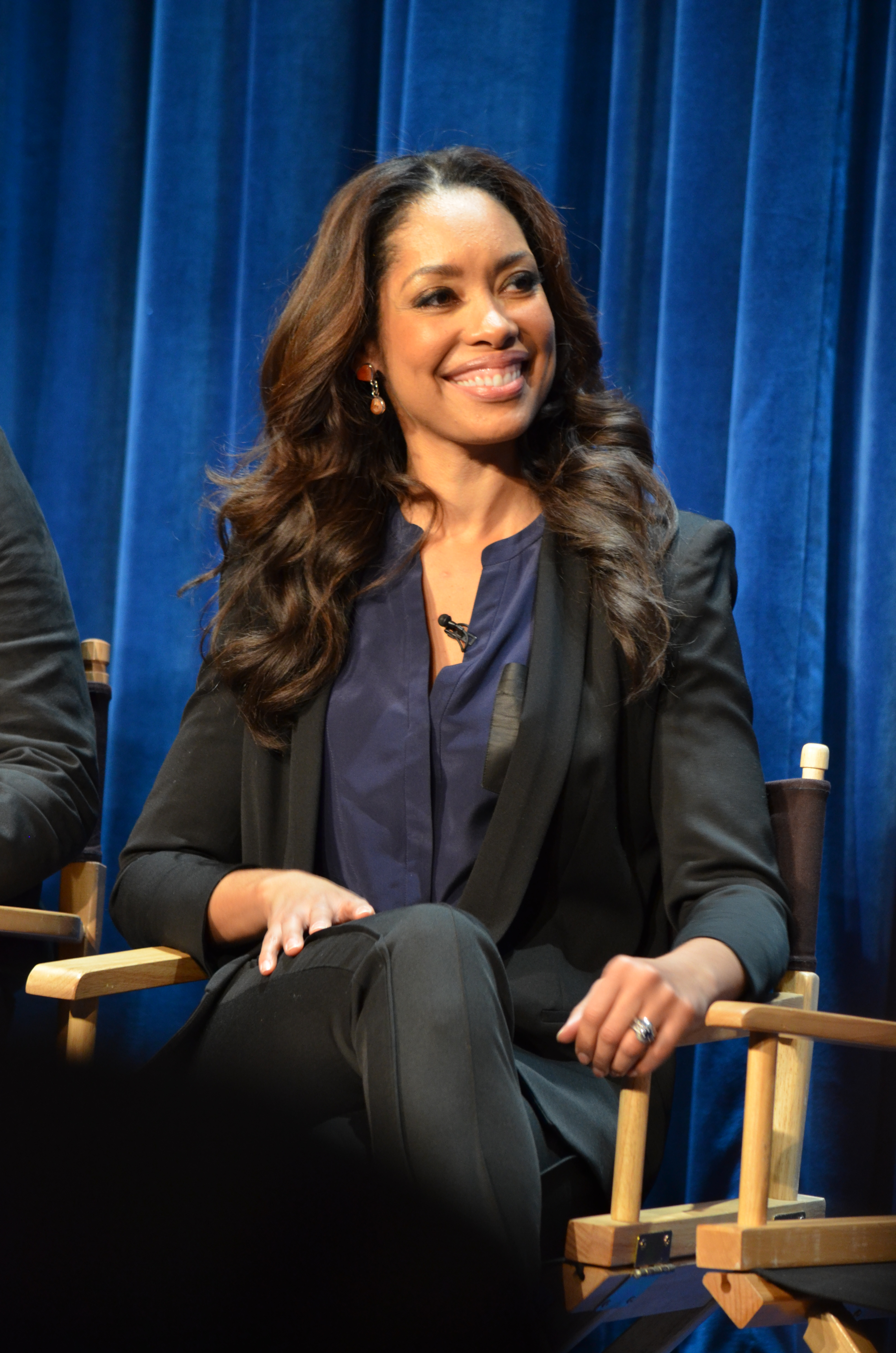
Gina Torres

Jessica Lourdes Pearson, played by Gina Torres, is the co-founder, name/managing partner of Pearson Hardman (later Pearson Darby, Pearson Darby Specter, Pearson Specter, and finally Pearson Specter Litt). She received her undergraduate degree from Vassar College on a full scholarship, graduated second in her class from Harvard Law, served on the Law Review, and did one year as the first black female clerk in the Third US Circuit Court of Appeals. Although she is well-respected, her "overbearing nature" and "holier-than-thou attitude", as described by Harvey Specter, often makes it difficult for those working with and for her. When faced with a dilemma, she will choose the less risky choice, although it may have diminished returns. If, in spite of this, Harvey or Mike Ross choose a riskier but more profitable course of action, she will harshly rebuke him, even if the risk pays off. Despite outward appearances, Jessica has performed unethical, immoral, and possibly illegal deeds. When confronted by Louis in season 4, Jessica admits to being a hypocrite. She takes loyalty seriously and will react badly to those who betray her, as in season 1 when she discovers that a good friend has been stealing from the firm for years before harshly leading a lawsuit against her.

During college, she felt that classmate Ella Medeiros, who is currently a judge, was too uptight; they were simultaneously competing for a job they both wanted. To neutralize her as a threat to Jessica's chances, she caused Ella to become heavily intoxicated and placed her in the nude whilst unconscious in a lecture classroom. This comes back to haunt Jessica when Ella becomes the judge assigned to a case involving her client. Whenever Jessica feels that someone is too uptight, she "straightens them out"; to straighten Louis Litt out, she did to him what she did to Ella, and told him to blame Harvey, to straighten Harvey out.

Jessica is in a quandary with respect to Harvey: she acknowledges the fact that Harvey is her greatest asset and the firm's best rainmaker because of his willingness to do whatever it takes to win, but she has difficulty controlling him and cannot trust him to do exactly as she instructs. Jessica is divorced from Quentin Sainz, a pharmaceutical chemist and businessman who was diagnosed with ALS, and later dies in the third-season episode “Yesterday's Gone”.

At the end of season 1, Trevor Evans informs her that Mike does not have a law degree and Harvey is protecting Mike. When Jessica investigates, she discovers that Harvard's records show that Mike has a law school diploma, but she also finds that he has no record of an undergraduate degree, convincing her that the Harvard degree is a fraud. Despite planning on having Harvey fire Mike, she lets Mike continue working due to Daniel Hardman’s return to the firm and Harvey threatening to quit if Mike is fired, leaving her vulnerable to Daniel.

Jessica uses Mike's secret against him at the end of season 2, when she has him deliberately lose a case to ensure her merger with Darby International goes through, under the threat that she will use an anonymous letter to reveal Mike's status as an unlicensed attorney. This puts her at odds with Harvey, and even though she and Harvey work together on a case while she tries to make amends, she admits that if she had to do it all over again, she would. In the meantime, Mike cashed in a favor with the firm's I/T specialist to gain proof that the anonymous letter came from Jessica's hard drive, meaning Mike can now put Jessica's career in jeopardy should she reveal his secret. With this threat lifted, Harvey plots, with Darby’s apparent compliance, to take over the New York office from Jessica. Eventually, Harvey admits this to her, and their relationship is temporarily destroyed. She remains angry for a while and make that clear to both Harvey and Edward. Eventually, she begins to empathize with Harvey, and as a consolation prize, makes him a name partner.

After Ava's charges are dropped, Jessica forces Darby to begin negotiations to dissolve the merger. She agrees to waive the Harvard rule for Rachel and, after noting her long presence at the firm and overwhelming expertise as a paralegal, agrees to also pay for Rachel's law school tuition, as she did for Harvey.

In season 4, it is revealed that Jessica had been involved in a romantic relationship with Jeff Malone, a senior prosecutor for the SEC, for quite some time. She hires him at the firm at the beginning of the season, but insists that the romantic aspect of their relationship is finished for the duration of his time at the firm. She eventually relents and changes her mind on this due to Malone's respectful but incessant forcing of his emotions on her. Eventually, she is forced to lie to Jeff about the truth behind Louis' sudden resignation and near-immediate return, which puts their relationship on the line. When Jeff uncovers her deceit, he breaks up with her and resigns from the firm a few days later.

In season 6, Jessica leaves the firm to Louis and Harvey to explore more of herself by moving to Chicago to live with Jeff. She appears in season 7 on various occasions.

=== Katrina Bennett ===
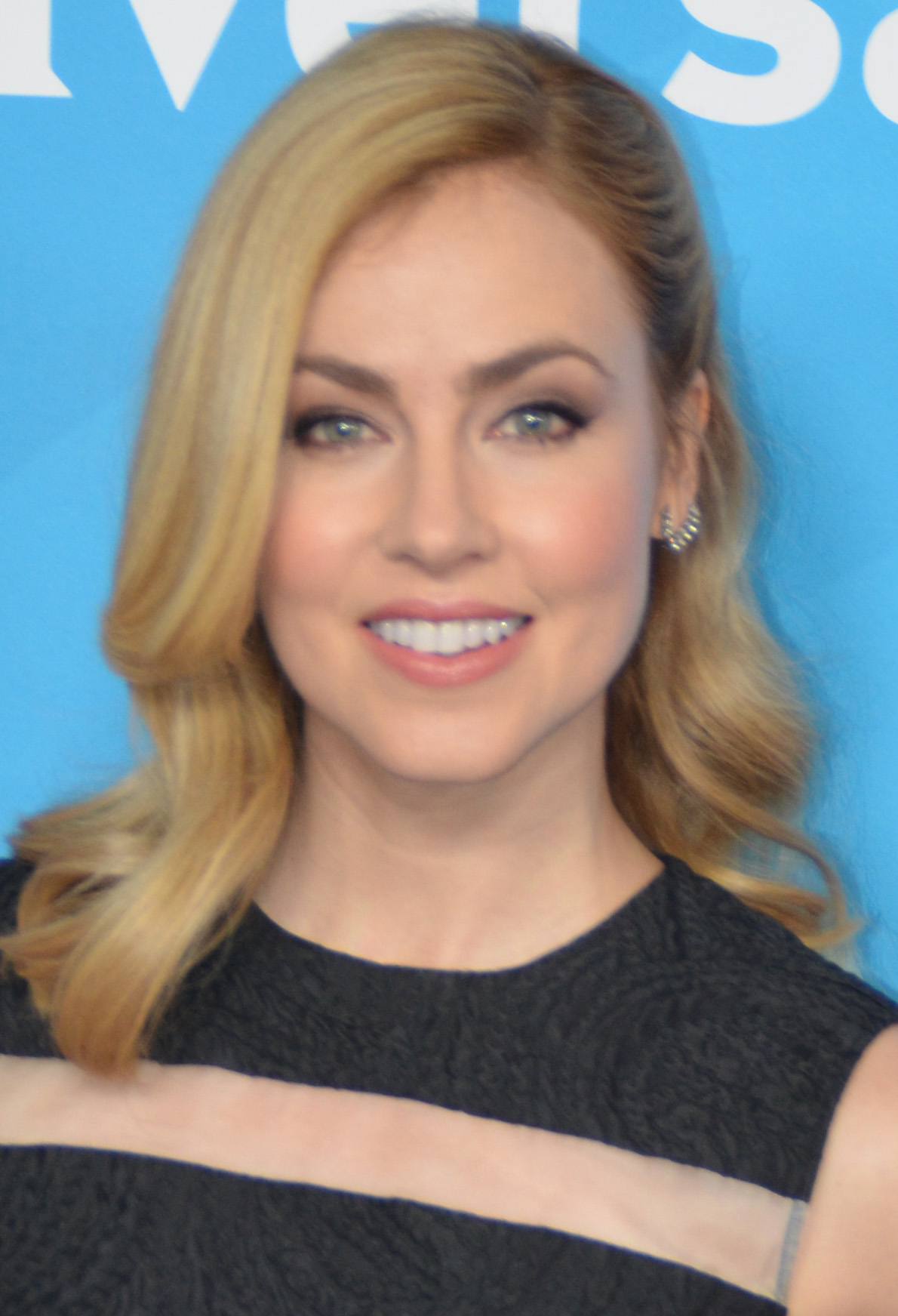
Amanda Schull

Katrina Amanda Bennett, played by Amanda Schull (no relation to Rebecca Schull, who plays Mike's grandmother), is a fifth-year associate attorney recently hired at Pearson Hardman. She first appears in the season two episode "Blind-Sided" as an assistant district attorney in the Manhattan DA's office, assigned to prosecute a hit-and-run accident case involving the son of a longtime client of Harvey's. She offers Mike a deal on the case in exchange for Mike putting in a good word for her with Harvey, indicating her desire to leave the DA's office and enter private practice. She was soon after hired by Harvey, but solely to protect Mike from being investigated after he broke privilege during the case's proceedings. Once hired, she constantly uses her "fifth" year status to intimidate everyone beneath her at the firm; she browbeats both Rachel and Mike into following her orders as if they were her subordinates under her purview (she might outrank them in terms of seniority, but they do not report to her and are not required to follow her instructions). In the episode "Unfinished Business", she desires to be involved in a case that Harvey and Mike are working on, so she sneaks into Harvey's office while Harvey is gone and Donna is away from her desk and places a file with important (though unsolicited) research on Harvey's desk. When confronted by Mike in Harvey's office, she refuses to back off, only doing so after being sternly reprimanded by Donna in support of Mike. She later attempts to make amends with Mike, but he rebuffs her. Suspicious of her motives, Mike points out her mistreatment of everyone below her level at the firm since her arrival. In response, she deliberately humiliates Mike to the whole firm by creating a prank cartoon with Mike's face attached to a baby in a stroller with a pacifier, then displays it on all the computer monitors in the entire firm by hacking the firm's server. When confronted by Harvey, she claims to be resentful of the fact that he hired her to solve a crucial problem, but since then he completely ignores her, not giving her any cases or instructions. She resents that Harvey uses only Mike on most cases, insisting that he should be also working with her.

Ultimately, her actions against Mike lead her to be left to only work with Louis, to whom she had initially refused a request to be his personal associate. Louis eventually gives in and gives her a case to work on, and she becomes his protégé. After she and Mike are forced to work together on Louis's case and they come up with a solution, she tells Louis that Mike deserves the credit. Katrina and Mike call a truce, though she assures him that her allegiance is now to Louis. Her loyalty to Louis gets her fired by Jessica in the season 3 episode "Know When to Fold 'Em", but Rachel is able to convince Jessica that Katrina was not at fault, and she is soon reinstated.

In season 4, she helps Louis navigate through the Gillis Industries takeover battle, and his dealings with Charles Forstman, even forging a document to cover up Louis's part in the tax evasion on Forstman's behalf. In the episode "This is Rome", she gives the recently fired Louis information that allows him to steal a Pearson Specter client, which is a condition of Louis's offer of a senior partnership from Robert Zane. She assumes that she will be Louis's associate at his new firm, and is therefore not bothered when Jessica finds out and fires her—that is, until Jessica reveals that Mike was able to win the client back, meaning Louis will not be getting the job he was promised. Later in the season, Rachel gets the presently unemployed Katrina a job at her father's firm.

In season 5, Katrina reappears while Mike is at the offices of Rand Kaldor Zane, to help him work on Mike and Robert Zane's class-action lawsuit against Kelton Insurance. In season 6, Katrina is lured back to the struggling Pearson Specter Litt firm, after Louis convinces her she will have a much quicker path to senior partner at her old place of employment. She makes senior partner at Zane Specter Litt in season 8. Katrina is fired by special master Faye Richardson in the penultimate episode of the series (season 9), but is rehired following Faye's exit and promoted to name partner in the series finale.

=== Alex Williams ===
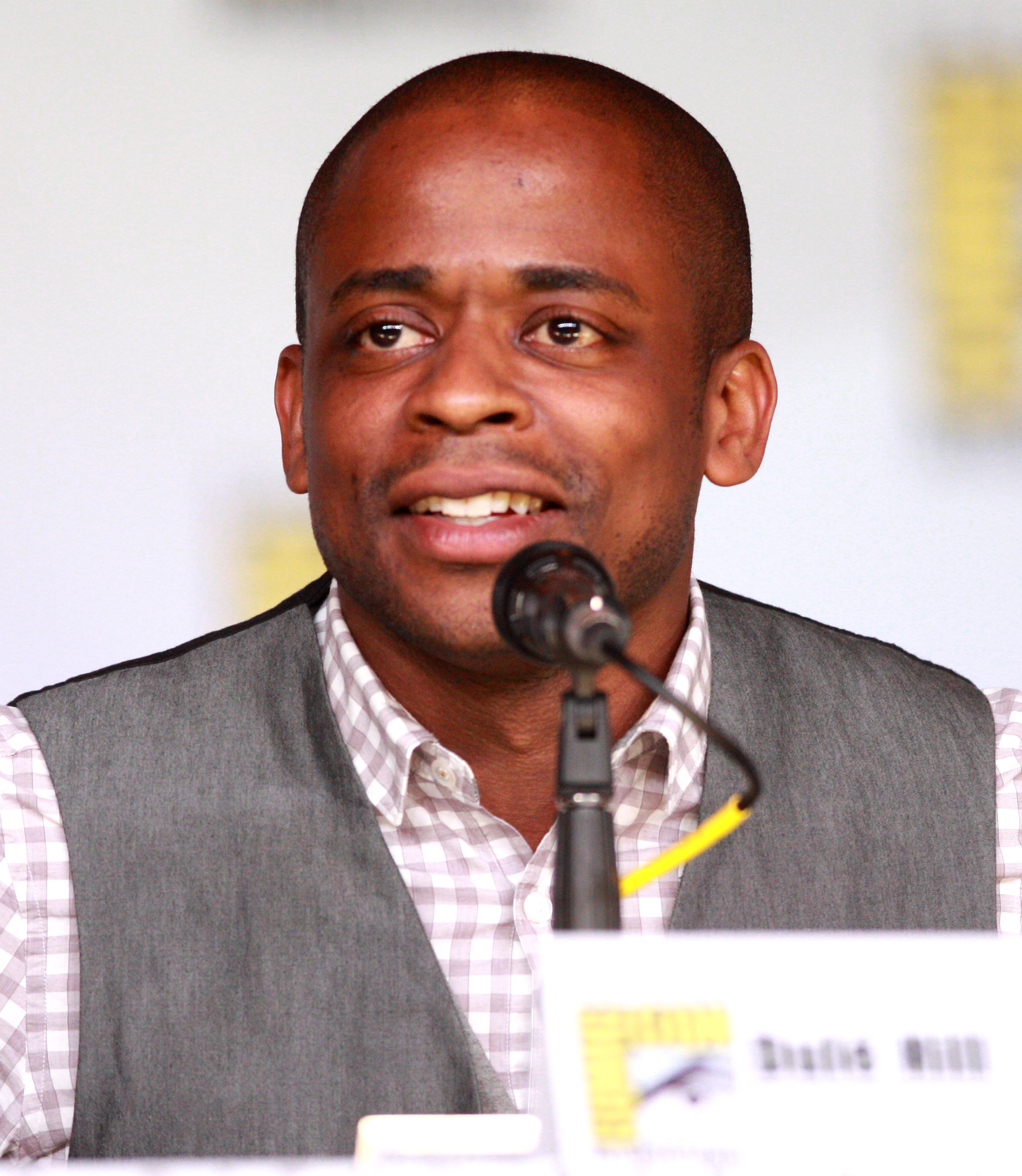
Dulé Hill

Alex Williams, played by Dulé Hill, joins the firm in season 7 after Harvey convinces him to leave Bratton Gould. He serves as one of the main characters of season 8, as he competes with Samantha to get his name on the wall next after a merger with Robert Zane. Harvey and Robert ultimately agree to put both Samantha's and Alex's names on the wall. It is revealed in season 7 that Alex, under duress, helped cover up the Reform Corp prison murder while at Bratton Gould, something that has haunted him ever since.

It is known that Alex and Harvey had been close friends before his arrival at the firm. Harvey had previously attempted to join Alex at his previous firm of Bratton Gould but reneged on the offer after Jessica promised him promotion to senior partner. This makes Alex look unprofessional in the eyes of his boss, Tommy Bratton, who gives him the reform corp case knowing it will put him in jeopardy as punishment for not ensuring Harvey join the firm after a job was made available for him.

=== Samantha Wheeler ===
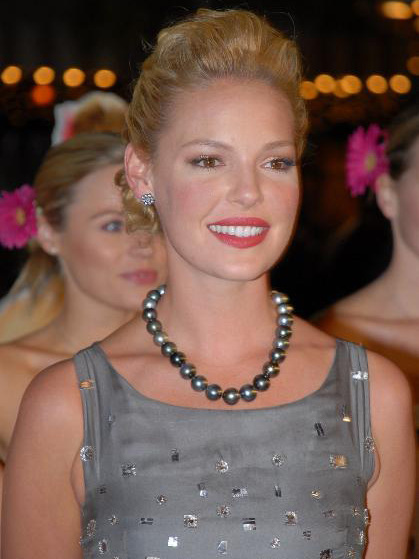
Katherine Heigl

Samantha Wheeler, played by Katherine Heigl, joins the firm when Specter Litt merges with Robert Zane's part of his original firm. She serves as Robert's right-hand man. After being promised by Zane that her name would be next on the wall, she learns that she will be in competition with Alex for that honor because Harvey had promised the same thing to Alex. Having come from a difficult childhood in Foster care, Samantha looks to Robert as a father figure. In season 9, she decides to search for her biological parents. After meeting her birth father, she learns that neither of her parents gave her up. The father says he merely had a fling with her mother, who never told him she got pregnant, and her mother died when Samantha was two years old. She is fired from Specter Litt Wheeler Williams in season 9 by Faye Richardson, who was appointed by the bar as a special master to oversee operations at the firm following the disbarment of Robert Zane. In the series finale, Louis rehires Samantha and her name is returned to the wall.

== Recurring characters ==
=== Jenny Griffith ===
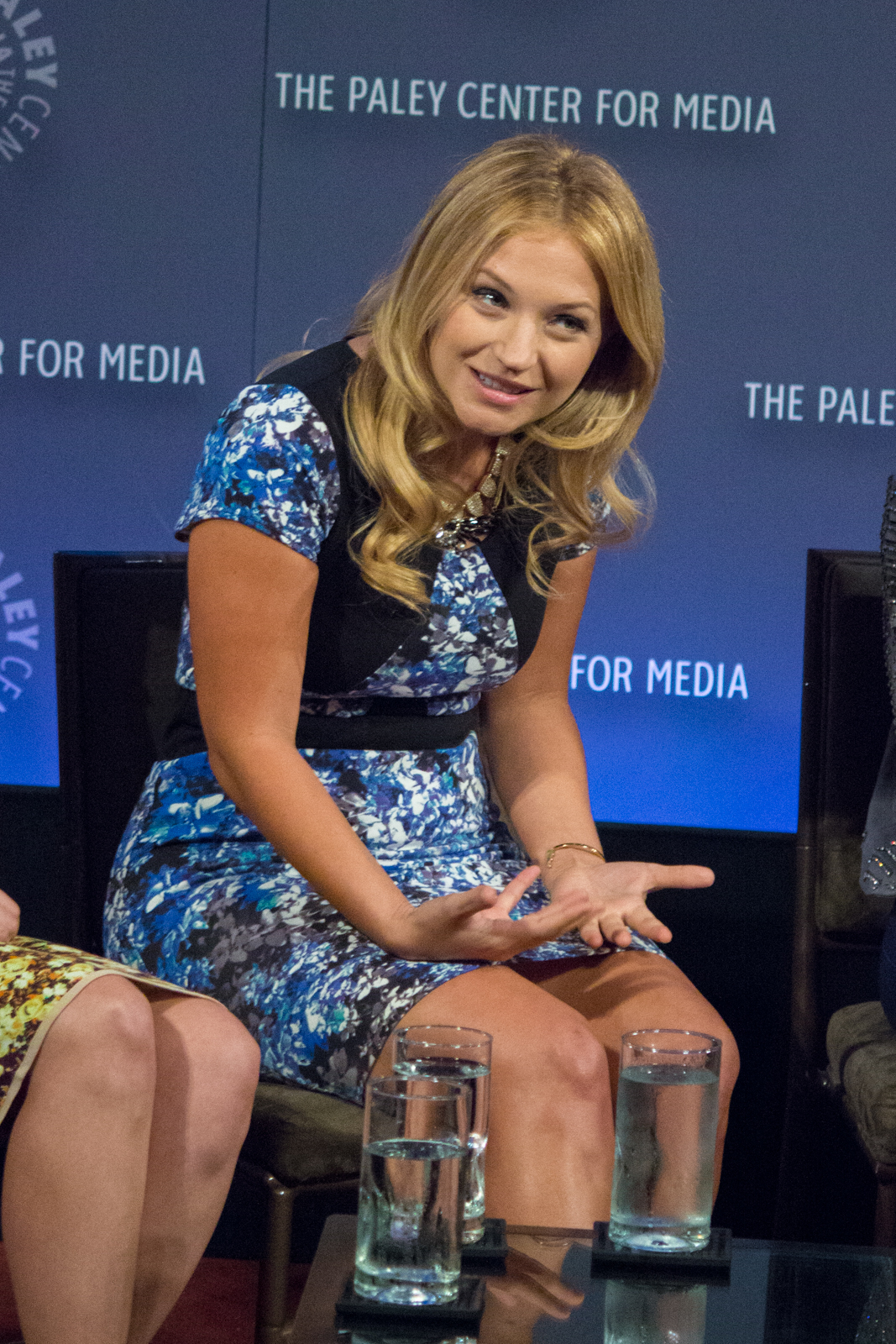
Vanessa Ray

Jenny Griffith, played by Vanessa Ray, is Trevor Evans' girlfriend and a close friend of Trevor's best friend Mike Ross. Though she is Trevor's girlfriend, she has had feelings for Mike since their first meeting and kisses him while she is still dating Trevor. She is initially unaware that Trevor is dealing marijuana. When she learns the truth, she is upset that both Trevor and Mike lied to her. She asks Mike to convince Trevor to stop dealing, but before Mike can talk to him, Trevor again lies and tells her that he stopped dealing because of his conversation with Mike. Mike tells Jenny that the conversation never happened, and she breaks up with Trevor. She is happy to learn that Mike is working as a lawyer and keeps the fact that he does not have a law degree secret. She agrees to act as a witness in Mike's mock trial, and they begin their relationship while practicing for the trial. However, Louis warns her about Rachel and Mike since he saw them kissing. She then proposes the idea of them going on a double date with Rachel. Trevor tells her about a voice-mail Rachel Zane left for Mike, and she breaks up with Mike to allow him to pursue a relationship with Rachel.

=== Trevor Evans ===
Trevor Evans, played by Tom Lipinski, is a marijuana dealer and a computer programmer of dubious skill. He is also Mike Ross' best friend and is Jenny Griffith's boyfriend. He has become financially well-off dealing drugs, but he allows Jenny to believe that he makes his money through computer programming. In the pilot episode, a cash-strapped Mike agrees to deliver drugs for Trevor, but Trevor accidentally sends him into a sting operation. Mike stops talking to Trevor, partially because of the operation and partially because his boss Harvey Specter orders him to do so, and their friendship begins to deteriorate. Because Trevor refuses to stop dealing drugs, Jenny breaks up with him. In the episode "Bail Out", Trevor is held for ransom, and Harvey rescues him. Mike then buys Trevor a bus ticket to Montana, where Trevor stays for most of the season. He later returns and helps Harvey and Mike intimidate a witness into telling the truth. However, Trevor learns that Mike and Jenny are dating through a voice-mail Rachel Zane left Mike. Angry, he tells Jenny about the voicemail, casting doubt over Mike's feelings for Rachel, and tells Jessica Pearson that Mike does not have a law degree in the season 1 finale. At the end of the season 2 premiere, Mike meets in person with Trevor, who threatens to ruin Mike's life more than he already has. Mike responds by revealing that he knows Trevor's social security number and will use the information against Trevor if the need arises.

In seasons 2, 3, and 4, Trevor reappears, but only in flashback episodes.

In season 5, Trevor reappears in the present, meeting Mike for a drink at a bar to discuss Mike's wedding. Trevor apologizes and takes responsibility for his actions at their last encounter in person (season 2, episode 1). Trevor explains to Mike that, though he graciously appreciates the invitation, he cannot attend because his wife has forbid him from staying in contact with anyone from his past who was associated with him and his criminal activities, and that Mike's current status as a fraudulently licensed (and practicing) attorney fits that category. Later in the season, he appears as a witness for the prosecution against Mike, after promising Mike that he would not. Trevor insists that he had no choice but to comply with Anita Gibbs (the ADA prosecuting the case) and that she showed him that they had an airtight case. While on the stand, Harvey is able to destroy his credibility and testimony in open court, pointing out that Trevor has a long criminal past, his girlfriend (Jenny) left him for Mike once she found out he was dealing, and that he is only appearing because he was promised immunity.

=== Edith Ross ===
Edith Ross, played by Rebecca Schull, is Mike Ross' paternal grandmother and guardian after his parents' deaths. Mike placed her in a nursing home after she fell while she was alone. To pay for a private nursing home and keep her out of a state facility, he began taking the LSAT for others and accepts a temporary job dealing marijuana for his friend Trevor Evans. Edith dislikes Trevor and referred to him as an anchor dragging Mike down. She knows that Mike has been smoking marijuana and only wants him to live up to his potential. She dies at the end of the season two episode "Asterisk".

In seasons 3, 4 and 5, Edith reappears, but only in flashback sequences.

=== Kyle Durant ===
Kyle Durant, played by Ben Hollingsworth, is an associate attorney at Pearson Hardman during season 1. He is a favorite of Louis Litt, under whom all the associates work, and Louis frequently pits him against Mike Ross, the protégé of Louis's own rival Harvey Specter. Louis comments to Harvey that the rivalry between Kyle and Mike reminds him of their own rivalry as associates. Kyle is arrogant and lacking in morals, going so far as to renege on an oral settlement agreement in a mock trial against Mike and then mocking him in a whisper. When Rachel Zane needed a date for her double date with Mike and his girlfriend late in season one, she asks Kyle to go with her though she knows about Kyle and Mike's rivalry, and Mike suspects she was using Kyle to make Mike jealous. The character did not appear after season 1, with no mention of what happened to Kyle.

=== Harold Gunderson ===
Harold Gunderson, played by Max Topplin, is a former associate attorney at Pearson Hardman who works for Bratton Gould as of season 2. Harold is socially awkward, sensitive, and his infatuation with Rachel Zane is not reciprocated and makes her uncomfortable. He gets along well with Mike Ross, and the two are sometimes seen working together. Louis Litt tends to treat Harold poorly; Louis verbally abuses Harold and once forced him to watch over his ill cat even after discovering that Harold is severely allergic to cats. Despite Harold's clumsiness and seemingly poor legal skills, he was actually a very good student at Harvard, confiding to Mike that it is only Louis's domineering management that makes him appear flustered and incompetent. Louis eventually fires Harold in the wake of clients leaving the firm. However, through his connections with Jimmy, a former Pearson Hardman associate, Mike is able to get Harold a new job at Jimmy's new firm Bratton Gould.

Harold resurfaces in season 3, as the attorney asked by Mike to represent the foreign nationals who are witnesses in the pending Ava Hessington murder trial, getting the witnesses to settle on an undisclosed amount in a civil suit so that they would therefore not be called as witnesses in the murder trial. He later appears in a mock trial as a witness called by Nigel Nesbitt, testifying against Louis. But the move backfires when Rachel (acting as Louis's "lawyer") gets Harold to admit that Louis actually prepared him quite well to be a successful lawyer at Bratton Gould. Harold's deal with Mike in the Hessington case gets them both investigated by the US Attorney's Office at the end of season 3. Louis gets Harold released.

Harold later approaches Mike in season 5, offering to testify at Mike's trial as a witness who did indeed know him at Harvard Law.

In Season 9, Harold returns when Louis misrepresents himself as Harvey to a potential client. Harold is the one who figures out Louis' ploy and leverages his way back to Specter Litt Williams.

=== Jimmy Kirkwood ===
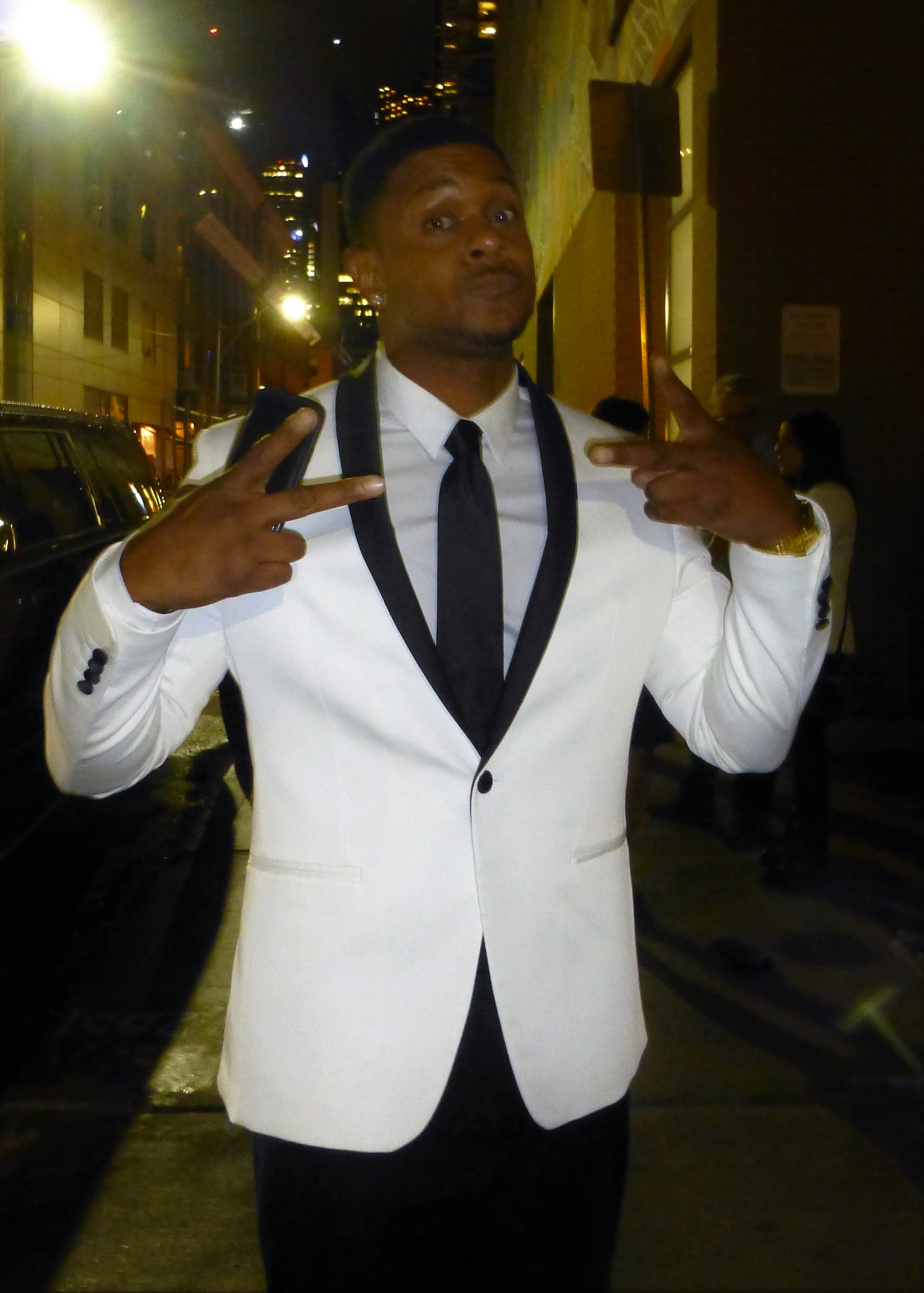
Pooch Hall

Jimmy Kirkwood, played by Pooch Hall, is a former associate attorney at Pearson Hardman who works at Bratton Gould as of season 2. Jimmy came from a working-class background, made his own way to get accepted into Harvard Law, graduate and become an associate attorney at Pearson Hardman, having been hired around the same time as Mike Ross. First appearing in the season 1 episode 'Undefeated', Jimmy leaks a confidential witness list to a rival law firm Wakefield Cady, in exchange for a junior partnership; Jimmy has very large outstanding law school debts. His actions cause the firm's leadership to suspect Rachel Zane as the source of the leak and get her temporarily suspended. Mike goes to Benjamin, and makes a wager to convince Benjamin to reveal the name of the person who came to him asking for the confidential employee codes which identify individual employees who use the firm's resources for personal reasons. Benjamin comes to Mike later to make good on the favor, and as he walks away, addresses Jimmy as "Louis" indicating that Jimmy had posed as Louis to Benjamin in order to get the employee codes. Mike is able to deduce this and confronts Jimmy, who eventually admits to leaking the list. Mike gives him an ultimatum: either he comes forward and admits to leaking the list, or Mike will turn him in. It is never shown or indicated that Jimmy comes forward, but Rachel gets reinstated.

Jimmy appears in the season two episode "Blood in the Water" now working for Bratton Gould. He offers Mike a chance to move to Bratton Gould, but Mike refuses. He later returns to Jimmy, convincing him to get Harold a job after Louis fired him.

Jimmy does not appear again until the season five episode "Compensation", in which he asks for Mike's help in a personal matter, a class action lawsuit.

=== Dana Scott ===
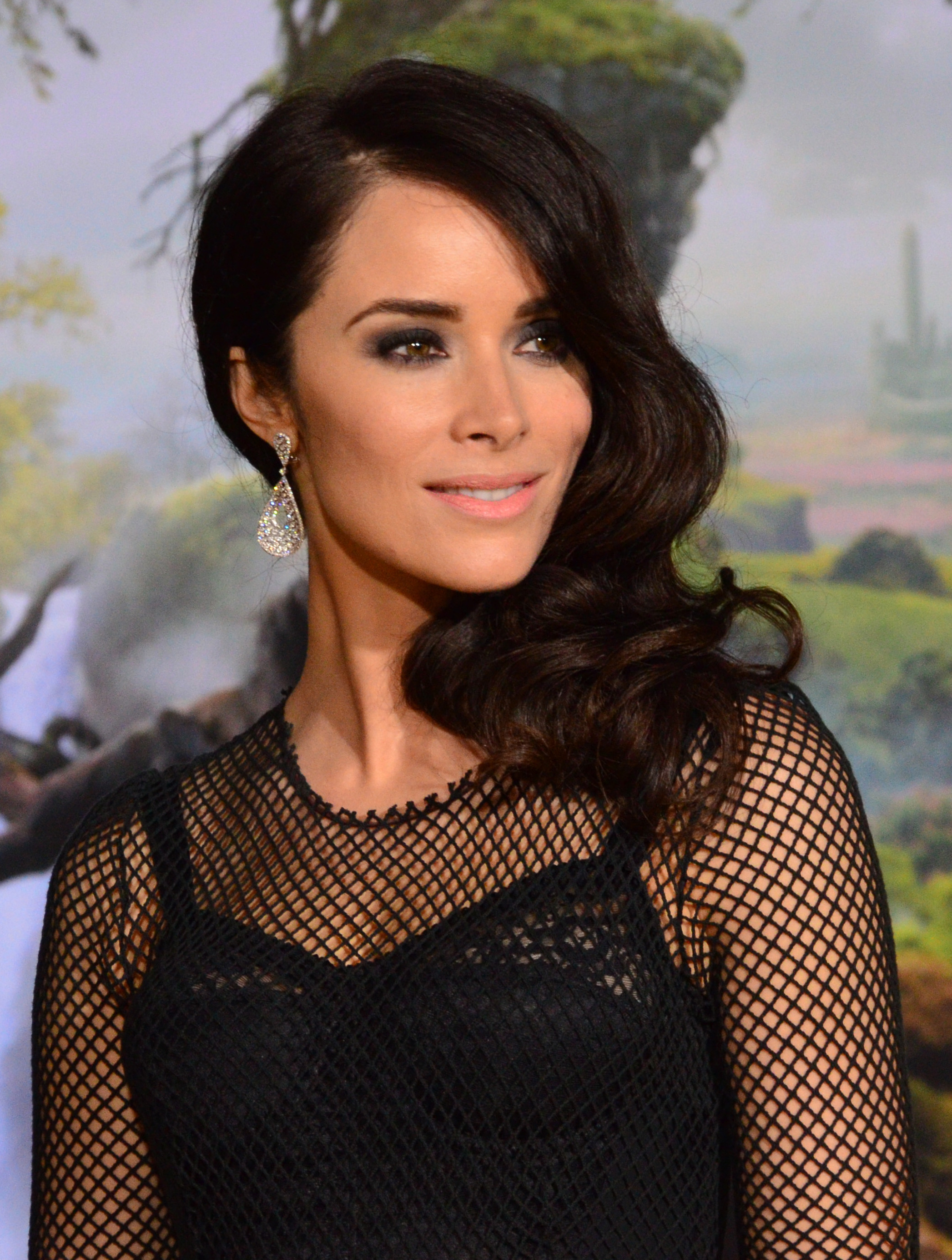
Abigail Spencer

Dana "Scottie" Scott, played by Abigail Spencer, is Harvey's on-and-off again girlfriend at Harvard and rival in the professional world. She graduated first in their class at Harvard Law. She also clerked for a US Supreme Court Justice. She works at Edward Darby's London based international law firm. She first appears as the opposing counsel in a merger that Harvey's client, Jones (a British-born luxury hotel chain proprietor) is seemingly eager to complete with Scottie's client Daniel Vega, which Harvey believes he is pushing through too hastily. When Harvey discovers Scottie is opposing counsel he is taken aback and becomes incredibly cautious, wary of Scottie's methods. Scottie tries to con Harvey into believing that her client wants to merge when in reality it is a hostile takeover in disguise. When Harvey discovers this, he instructs his client to immediately put his hotel chain's most valuable assets on the market, foiling her plan and making the advantages of a hostile acquisition disappear. Harvey then confronts her about it. Embarrassed, she pleads with him to not go through with it, knowing that it would make her look very foolish and risk her losing her client. Harvey agrees, in exchange for her admitting her mistake to both parties of the deal, who reconcile with each other and agree to go back to the original negotiations stipulating a merger. Vega ends up terminating her services and firing her anyway following the deal's closing.

In season 2 she returns, offering her firm's cooperation and resources on a multi jurisdictional class action lawsuit and, after its success, creates a merger situation that will make both Harvey and herself name partners at the merged Darby/Pearson firm. But because of inside information she gave to Harvey and Mike to help them beat Jessica, Darby personally fires her. Eventually, Harvey convinces Darby to keep Scottie, insisting that without her, Darby would not have the merger. Darby gives Harvey the option of where to send Scottie; he eventually decides to have Darby send her back to London instead of remaining in New York as she desired.

In season 3, Harvey begins an "official" romantic relationship with Scottie while also convincing Jessica to offer her a senior partnership at the firm. But this is short lived, ending in the season 3 finale when the two realized they could not handle the necessary separation between their personal and business lives.

In season 4, Harvey goes to Scottie to fulfill a favor to Robert Zane, asking her to settle her case against him. She initially refuses, but after a genuine plea from Harvey, she relents and agrees to do so.

In season 5, Harvey and Mike go to Scottie to see whether it was she who had reported Mike for being a fraud.

=== Travis Tanner ===
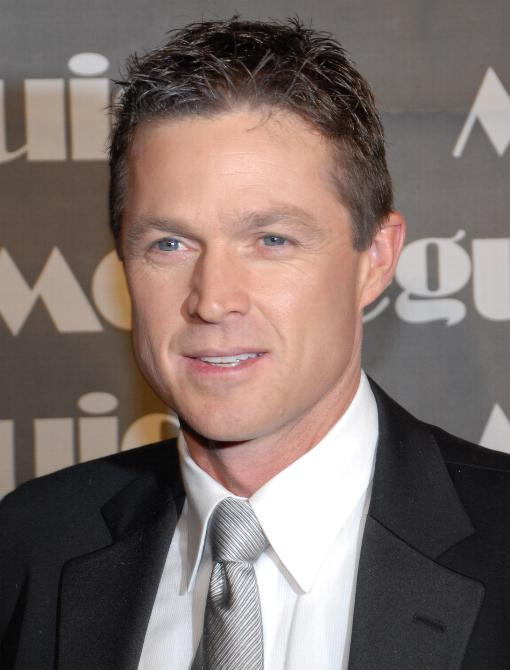
Eric Close

Travis Tanner, played by Eric Close, is a rival lawyer of Harvey's. He is introduced in the season-one episode "Undefeated" as a senior partner at Clyde McPhee, a firm in Boston. He received both his undergraduate and law degrees from Yale, with honors in both. He was a junior tennis champion and played at Yale as well. Before he met Harvey, Tanner had never lost a case. It is shown that he is willing to break the law to win, and he believes that Harvey is the same way. In his first case against Harvey, Tanner is initially successful (Harvey admits to Mike, "he [Tanner] has been a step ahead of me this entire time") but Harvey soon makes a comeback. He obtains an electronic wiretap recording (from his private investigator) of Tanner admitting to witness tampering with Harvey's plaintiffs in the case; since the wiretap was placed without a warrant, the recording is inadmissible as evidence for the case in court unless the person submitting it claims to have no knowledge of its origin. Harvey bluffs, threatening to submit an affidavit to this regard; if he had followed through on this ultimatum, Harvey would have been authorizing the submittal to court of a sworn document making a perjurious claim, regardless of its simultaneously proving Tanner's guilt. Tanner notes this to Harvey, but nevertheless backs down under threat of Harvey's evidence against him and accepts the terms, signing the settlement agreement; once Tanner does this, it leaves Harvey with no need to actually submit the affidavit.

At the beginning of season 2 he returns to the show as a senior partner at Smith Devane, a firm in New York, accusing Harvey of burying evidence in the season two episode "Discovery". He is determined to have Harvey disbarred and insists that it be included in the settlement. He eviscerates Harvey while deposing him, to the point where Harvey punches Tanner in the face. However, Daniel Hardman is able to blackmail him into dropping Harvey's disbarment from the agreement. The episode "High Noon" reveals that Hardman created the memo and told Tanner that the memo was fake, forcing him to drop the suit. Though Tanner privately implies this to Harvey, he refuses to testify in court to this regard.

At the end of season 3, Tanner returns as the lawyer representing Ava Hessington who is now suing the still-undissolved Pearson Darby Specter firm, and all of the people involved with her case, for malpractice. His strategy is attacking Scottie both personally and professionally. Tanner is aware that Harvey still has feelings for Scottie, and he is well aware of their past dalliances. He utilizes this as a vulnerability by humiliating Scottie while deposing her, forcing Harvey to think twice before responding while putting his ability to constrain his emotions under serious pressure, hoping that it will provoke him into intervening on Scottie's behalf by succumbing to Tanner's financially outrageous settlement demands. Tanner gets Stephen to sign an affidavit claiming that Scottie was complicit in the murders, but Donna is able to neutralize this. She visits Stephen in prison with Mike, then asks Mike to leave the room and gets Stephen to admit that he lied, unaware that he was being recorded. Ava later agrees to withdraw the suit.

In season 5, Tanner appears in the episode 'Toe to Toe' as the lawyer representing a young female entrepreneur in an intellectual property/contract dispute against one of Harvey's clients, for whom she was a long time employee but has recently quit to start her own company. Upon taking the case, Harvey seems eager, almost giddy, about going up against Tanner, which he sees as an opportunity to strike back at someone who has caused him no small amount of pain and scrutiny, both personally and professionally. Taking into account Tanner's skills and expertise based on their past cases against him, Mike initially reacts warily and cautions Harvey, noting that he has recently been suffering from a string of panic attacks, and that past experience against Tanner would indicate that it is prudent to assume the upcoming case will be intense and complicated and put Harvey's psychological endurance under serious pressure. But instead, Tanner, claiming to be a changed man, displays a marked difference from his well-known cocky and brashly confident personality, instead conducting himself as a consummate professional: relatively mild-mannered and humble, and reacting instead of immediately attacking, though still confident in his own abilities. Harvey refuses to believe it, and continues to use a combative nature, both during litigation and physically (punching Tanner in the face out on the street outside the office). Eventually, as the case continues, Mike starts to see that Tanner is no longer attacking Harvey indiscriminately or below the belt (as in their past cases), only responding as a veteran attorney might be expected to react to Harvey's disproportionate attacks. He comes to the conclusion that Tanner may be acting honestly, but because of past experiences Harvey is unwilling to take Tanner at his word and agree to his initial settlement offer, which Harvey himself admits to Mike in private is relatively fair, but still refuses to consider as a possibility because Tanner is the one presenting it. Mike realizes that Harvey's emotions are guiding his judgment, and he meets with Tanner privately without Harvey's knowledge, and convinces Tanner to voluntarily remove himself as the case's attorney of record, and allow Katrina Bennett to replace him. Mike then takes the first offer back to Harvey, who immediately agrees to take the deal once Mike points out that Tanner is no longer involved.

=== Cameron Dennis ===
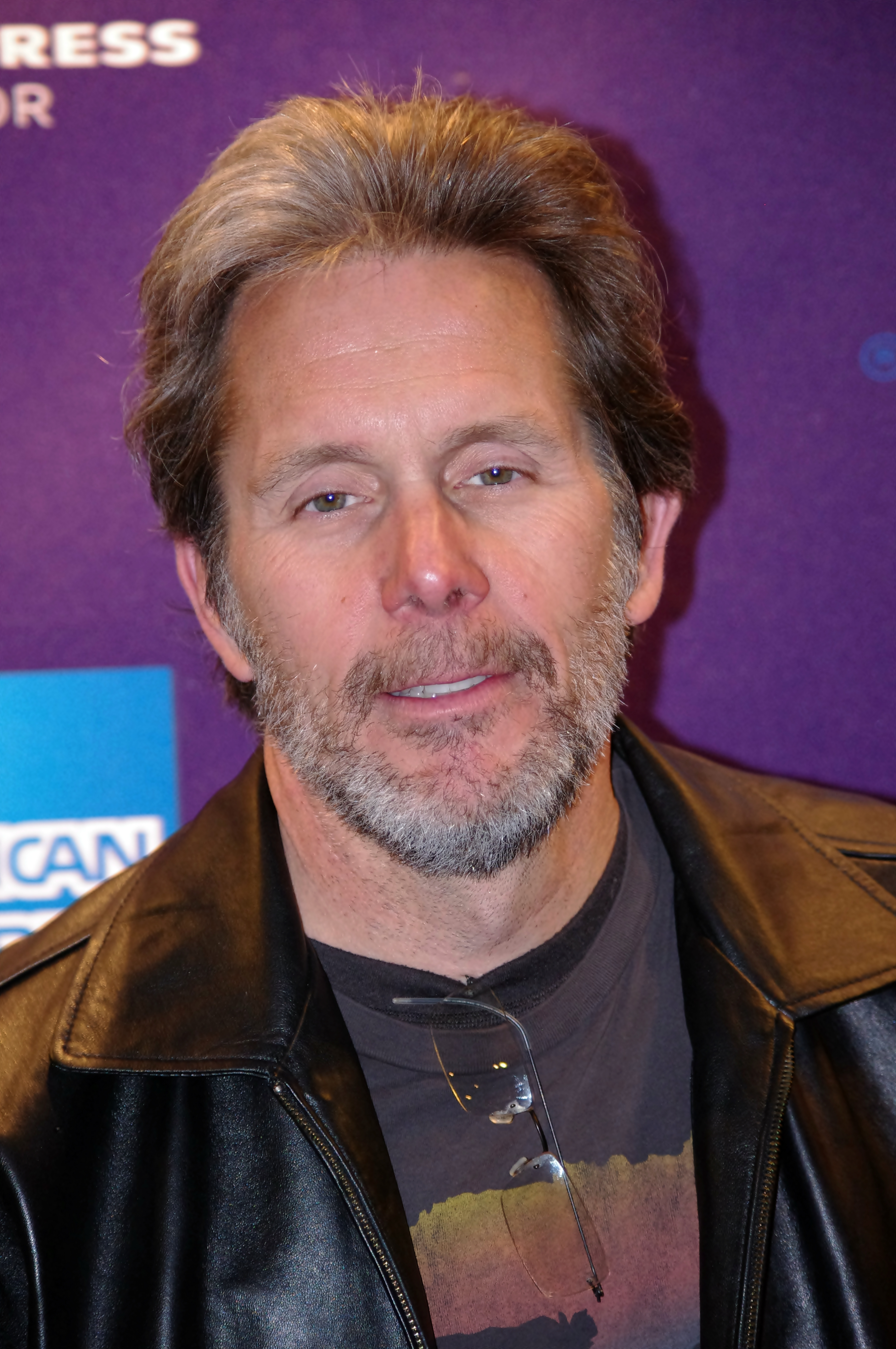
Gary Cole

Cameron Dennis, played by Gary Cole, is the former New York County (Manhattan) District Attorney. Jessica sent Harvey to the Manhattan DA's office to be mentored by Cameron straight after graduating from Harvard Law. He had a history of altering the evidence in cases to ensure high conviction rates, even at the cost of sending the innocent to jail. In season one he makes a deal with the state attorney general's office to save himself by selling out Harvey. It is not until Donna secretly presents evidence to Jessica of Cameron's past malfeasance behind Harvey's back that Jessica is able to force Cameron into changing his deal with the AG's office and resign from his position as DA, saving Harvey.

In season 3, Dennis returns (with a personal vendetta against Harvey) after being appointed as the special prosecutor in the US Attorney's case against Doctor Ava Hessington and her oil company, and he later brings murder charges against her when six dissidents are killed by the foreign colonel she bribed. He admits to Harvey that he took the case as retribution for Harvey's "betrayal" of him when he was forced to resign from his post as DA, when in reality Harvey knew nothing about Donna's actions at the time (and was furious with her once he did) until long after Cameron had stepped down. Jessica visits him and tells him that Harvey did not betray him and that he should be mad at Jessica and not take it out on Harvey's client. Cameron realizes Jessica's implication that it was Donna ('the redhead'), but claims it was irrelevant as Harvey did nothing to prevent Jessica from using the evidence against him; Jessica replies, "so after you threw him under the bus and I saved him, he should've thrown himself back under the bus?" Dennis ignores the question, claiming that "you [Jessica] just don't get it!", going on to imply that Jessica (as he has to Harvey in the past) has no right to point out occasional indiscretions in the morality of his methods, given that she is an expensive attorney for the wealthy while he is a state prosecutor (with a mediocre salary in comparison) serving the public interest.

The battle between Harvey and Cameron continues for the rest of the first half of the season, through litigation and eventually to trial, until Darby convinces Harvey to go to Cameron with a deal: drop the charges against Ava, Darby will plead guilty to five years' probation, and will testify at Stephen Huntley's murder trial. Cameron agrees to the deal, but Jessica convinces him to allow her to slip in an additional provision: Darby also must forfeit his legal license and agree to initiate dissolution negotiations. Darby reluctantly agrees to the final deal.

Dennis later appears in season 6 episode "The Hand That Feeds You", when he intervenes to prevent Frank Gallo from getting parole in exchange for Mike and Kevin Miller to get released from prison.

=== Daniel Hardman ===
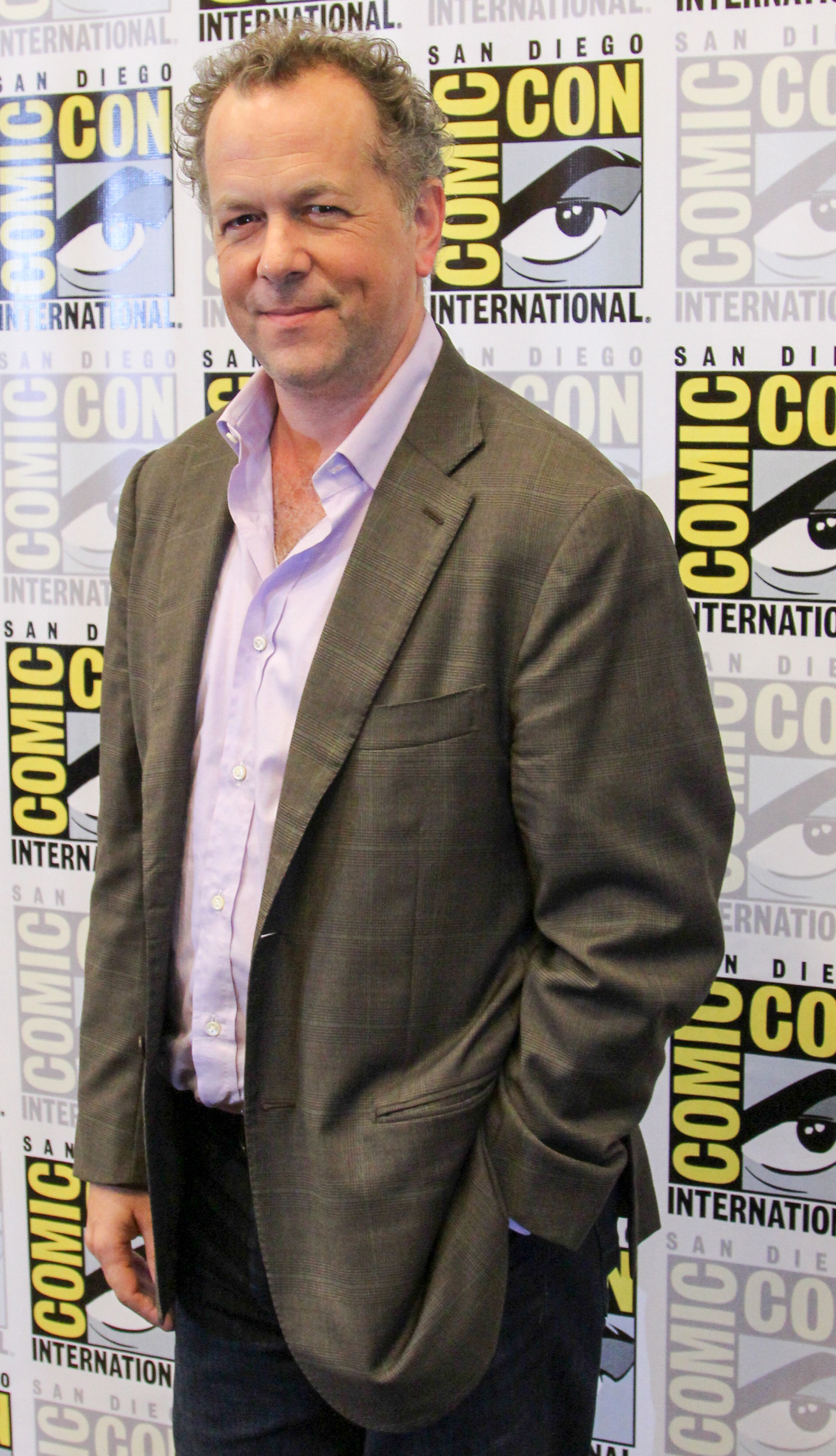
David Costabile

Daniel Hardman, played by David Costabile, is the co-founder of Pearson Hardman, former managing partner, and former mentor of Jessica. Five years before the events of the series, he had been secretly embezzling money from the firm's clients. When confronted, he told Jessica that he needed the money to afford breast cancer treatments for his wife Alicia. However, Harvey and Donna discover that the money is financing Daniel's affair with a colleague. Once this is discovered, Harvey deemed Daniel a liability and forced Daniel to resign and name Jessica as his successor by threatening to tell Alicia about the affair. Daniel resigns to prevent his wife's distress. Daniel first appears in the season two premiere following Alicia's death. He returns to the firm, this time working under Jessica instead of above her. Though he is a self-professed "changed man", Harvey and Jessica are not convinced. His role at the firm is more like a guide and voice of logic rather than a disciplinarian. Though he disagrees with Jessica's decision to fight for Harvey when he is accused of suppressing evidence rather than settle and lose Harvey, he does not go against her decision and urges her to prepare for the trial. He has a strong work ethic and is willing to work around the clock to accomplish a goal. At the end of "Sucker Punch", he takes advantage of the partners' apparent lack of faith in Jessica and requests a leadership vote to regain control of the firm. He wins the vote in "High Noon", but Harvey and Mike discover that Hardman forged the supposedly buried memo and orchestrated the lawsuit against the firm. When this is revealed at a partners meeting, Hardman is voted out of the firm. Though he agrees to not sue the firm in return for Jessica not revealing the incident and signing a confidentiality agreement, he tells her that this is not the end of their battle.

Hardman later returns to battle his old firm as a contractor, working for Rachel's father, Robert Zane, representing the name defendant in a class action gender discrimination lawsuit being led by Harvey against Folsom Foods, Robert Zane's client. Daniel manipulates the situation and the confidentiality agreement that Jessica signed on the night of his expulsion to get Monica Eton to sue Jessica Pearson simultaneously for wrongful termination, knowing that the combined assault will box the firm into a corner and damage its credibility; as Harvey insists to Jessica, "you can't be the name defendant in a gender discrimination case while we're suing Folsom Foods for the same thing!". His efforts to drain Jessica's resources and ruin what is left of her firm by having Monica file suit against Jessica are thwarted by Jessica's decision to merge with Darby's firm, giving her an insurmountable advantage in resources and (not including Darby learning of Daniel's prior embezzlement from to the due diligence required for merger negotiations, nullifying the confidentiality agreement's repercussions). He later appears in season 4 during a flashback episode.

In season 5, Hardman returns to make another run at taking back control of the firm from Jessica. He first appears when Jessica confronts him about having helped Jack Soloff to land Fletcher Engines as a client. He insists that Jack came to him looking for advice on Fletcher, with no ulterior motives or intentions against the firm itself; Jessica refuses to believe him. In the episode 'Uninvited Guests' Jack Soloff tries to convince the firm's senior partners to let Hardman back into the firm on a trial basis in exchange for sharing the revenues from a billion dollar client that Hardman just recently signed. It is later revealed that the client is the disgraced billionaire Charles Forstman, now incarcerated. Harvey is able to thwart all of Hardman's funding by agreeing to resign from the firm.

In season 8, Hardman reappears as the attorney representing Simon Lowe, a former ZSLWW client who Harvey got fired from his post as CEO. Lowe is using Hardman to get Harvey's law license stripped (so Hardman can take over the firm), accusing him of breaking privilege in order to protect Thomas Kessler, Alex William's client whom Lowe was looking to acquire. Harvey told Donna that Lowe had been lying to Kessler about his true intentions, but made her promise not to tell Kessler, as they are dating. Donna nevertheless is unable to restrain herself, and warns Kessler of Lowe's real intentions, causing him to refuse Lowe's initial offer. Lowe realizes that Kessler found out, and asserts that Harvey must have been the source. Hardman offers to represent Lowe pro bono. Zane visits Hardman at home and tries to get him to drop the suit. Hardman refuses, saying he needs to repair his reputation as a serious lawyer. But he accepts Zane's offer to drop the case if he can convince Ellen Rand and Eric Kaldor to make Hardman a name partner at their firm (Zane is unsuccessful). In the end, Zane decides to take the fall for breaking privilege in front of the Bar ethics committee and is thrown out of the Bar, leaving Hardman flabbergasted, but neutralizing his efforts against Harvey.

=== Sheila Sazs ===
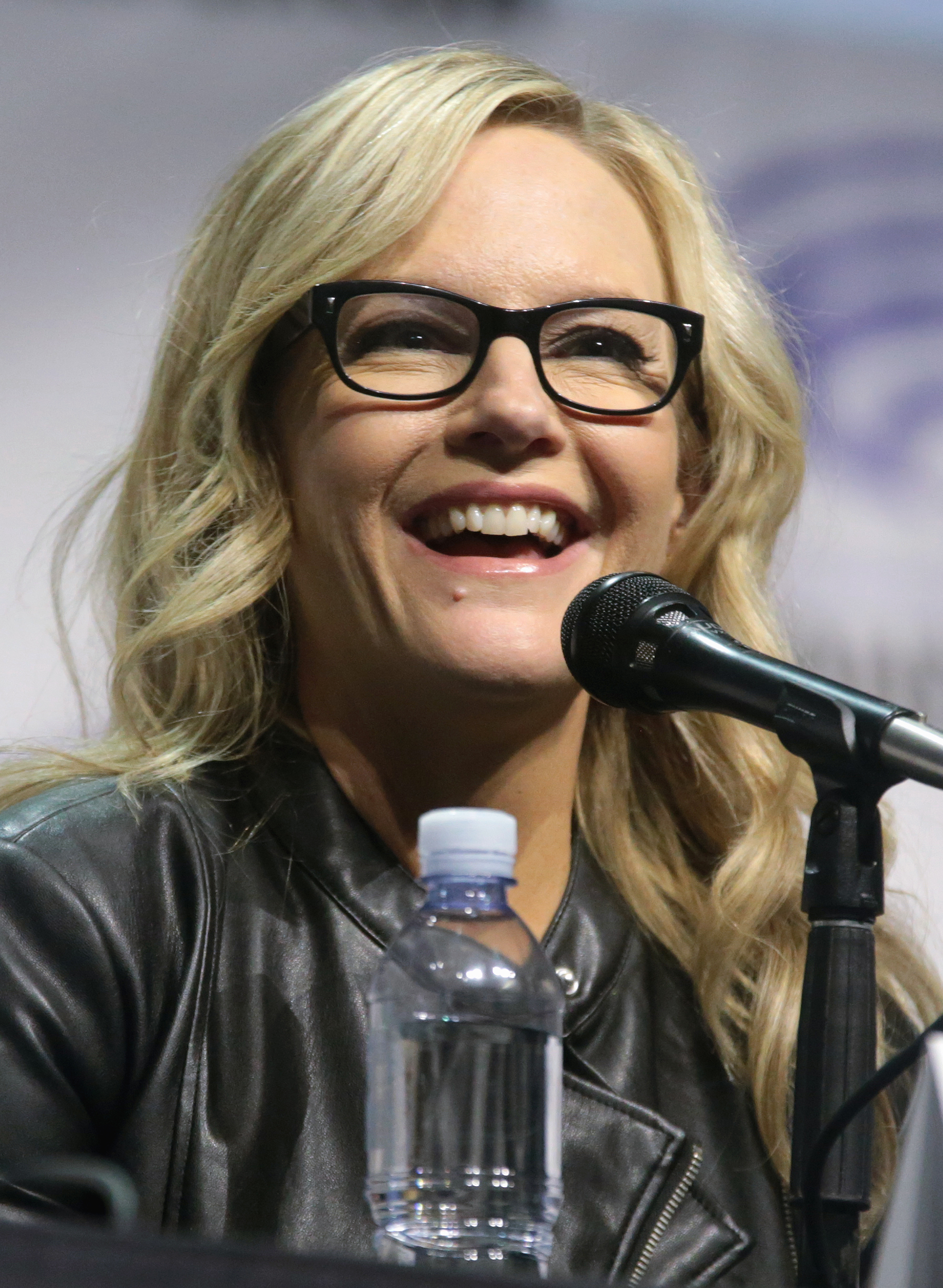
Rachael Harris

Sheila Amanda Sazs, played by Rachael Harris, is a high-level official in the Harvard Law School placement department, whose job is to place graduates as associate attorney positions at law firms. As such, she works with recruiters from top law firms such as Pearson Hardman, always trying to get maximum return for her graduates. She and Louis have had an on-off sexual relationship, and she appears to be turned on by his power, especially after he makes senior partner. Louis's relationship with Sheila helps him discover that there is no record of Mike Ross attending Harvard Law. Sheila and Louis get engaged in season 3, but break up soon after when they discover they want very different things after marriage.

Louis returns to Sheila in the wake of being fired from Pearson Specter in season 4, stating that he has secured a job in Boston and that they can finally be together. But Sheila rejects Louis's offer of reconciliation, feeling that it was work circumstances, more than love, that brought him back.

In season 5, it is revealed that Sheila leaked the information to Anita Gibbs that got Mike arrested for fraud. She reunites with Louis near the end of season 7, and in season 8 proclaims she wants to have a child with him. They get married in the final episode and have a daughter, who they name Lucy.

=== Monica Eton ===
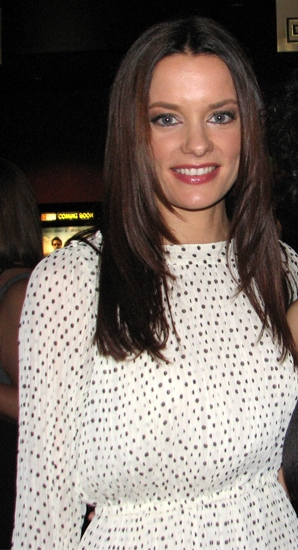
Gina Holden

Monica Eton, played by Gina Holden, is a former senior associate attorney at Pearson Hardman, who was Daniel Hardman's mistress. She first appears in the second season flashback episode 'Rewind'. Five years before the events of season 1, Monica was a senior associate at Pearson Hardman and a close friend of Rachel Zane. Louis Litt had a huge crush on her and perpetually asked her out despite the fact that she repeatedly rejected his advances. Throughout this time, she is conducting a clandestine affair with the firm's managing partner, Daniel Hardman; during Harvey's investigation of Hardman's embezzlement, Rachel mentions to Donna that Monica is absent every Tuesday for a Pilates class, coincidentally at the same time when Hardman is absent from the office weekly taking his wife to chemotherapy. Donna tells Harvey, who investigates and deduces that the money he has been embezzling is actually for supporting his affair with Monica; Harvey forces him into resigning by threatening to tell his wife. Despite no concrete evidence that Monica was aware of the embezzlement, she is still fired by Jessica for the affair and deemed a liability to the firm.

Monica returns in the second half of the second season to file suit with Hardman's help: one for wrongful termination against Jessica and one for sexual harassment against Louis. The two manipulate the proceedings by intentionally dragging them out, with their intention to drain the firm's resources. Mike is ultimately able to persuade Monica to settle after appealing to her senses.

=== Zoe Lawford ===
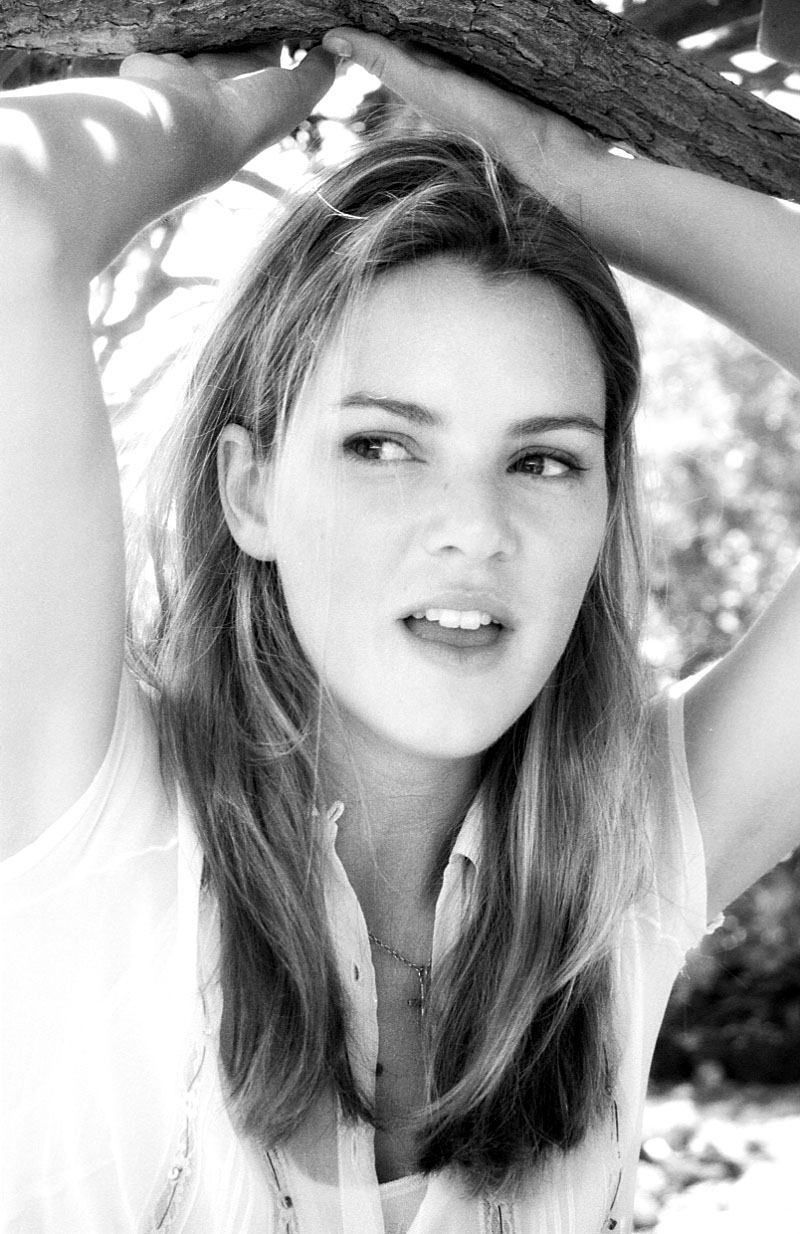
Jacinda Barrett

Zoe Lawford, played by Jacinda Barrett, who is Gabriel Macht's wife in real life, is a recurring character in season 2. She is a UK born former associate attorney of Pearson Hardman who briefly dated Harvey Specter. Harvey later convinces Jessica to bring her back temporarily as a jury consulting for a mock trial simulating Travis Tanner against Harvey in the Coastal Motors case. Harvey attempts to reignite their relationship, but Zoe reveals that her brother is terminally ill and she will end up adopting his daughter, and leave New York.

=== Robert Zane ===
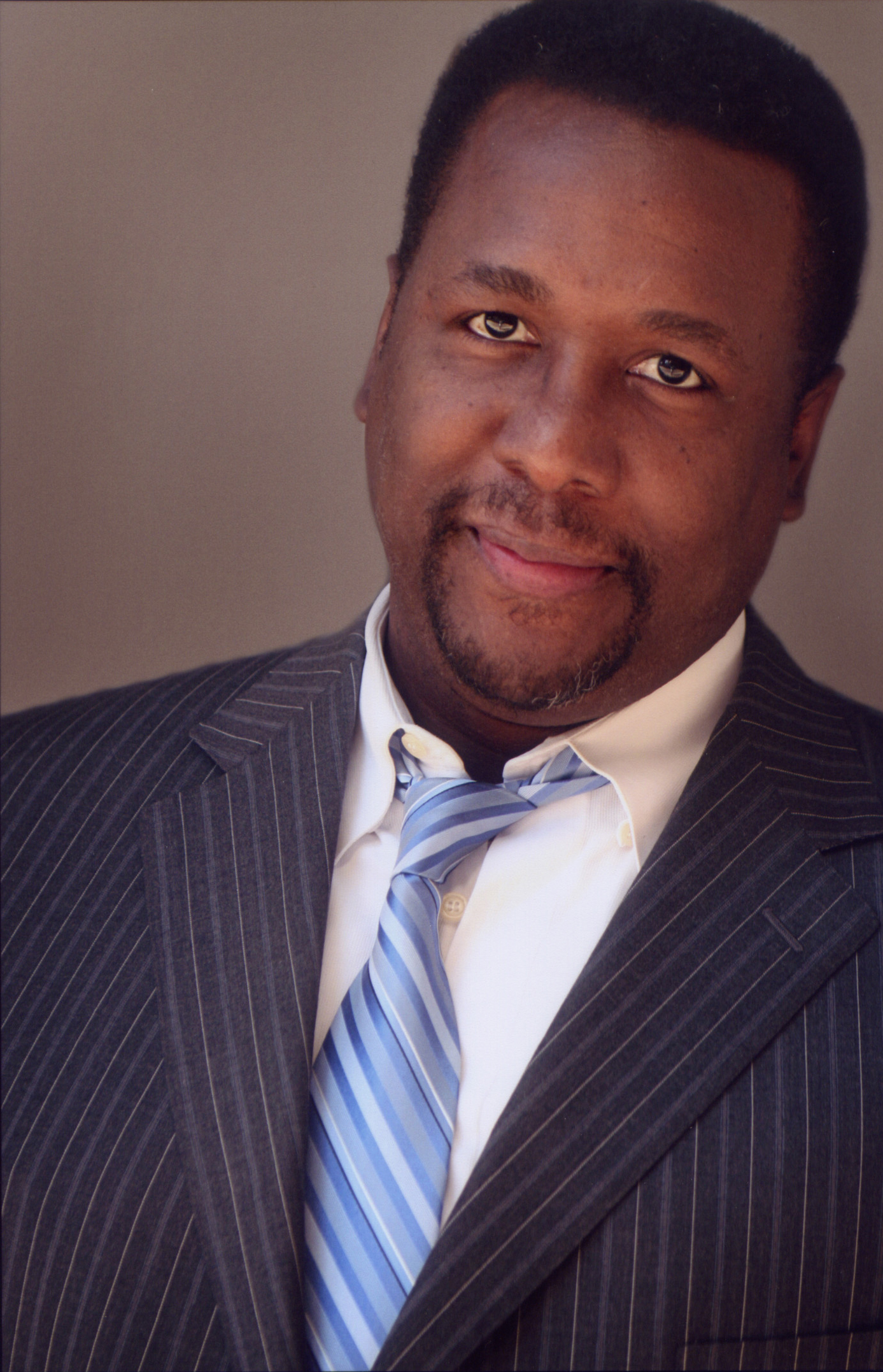
Wendell Pierce

Robert Zane, played by Wendell Pierce, is Rachel's father, a well known Harvard-educated attorney and former classmate of Daniel Hardman, who is a name partner at Rand Kaldor Zane, a powerful and respected New York law firm and a Pearson Hardman (later Specter) competitor. Rachel does not like to let people know she is his daughter, choosing instead to prove she can make it in the legal profession without his help. Robert has not been very supportive of Rachel's endeavors, especially when her test anxiety kept her from passing the LSAT, and he has on more than one occasion suggested that she choose another career path. Robert was the lawyer who replaced an attorney who died who was representing Folsom Foods against Pearson Hardman in a multi-case gender discrimination suit (season 2), until his daughter personally got involved with the case. That led Robert to drop the case and hire the recently dismissed Daniel Hardman to take over as an independent outside counsel for the case.

In season 3, he makes several appearances: once while hosting Mike and Rachel for dinner, and later towards the end of the season when Mike approaches him and tries to convince him to give the firm an advance on the settlement from the Folsom Foods case, in exchange for a 20% cut in the settlement payout. He eventually agrees, but only after Mike leverages his relationship with Rachel in order to convince him to do it (to Rachel's wrath upon her discovery), souring their relationship for a while.

In the second half of season 4, Mike approaches Zane to consider hiring Louis, who had been recently fired from Pearson Specter and was having trouble finding another job in New York. He agrees to meet with Louis, and the two of them hit it off. But when Louis tells him that he cannot bring any PS clients to Zane, he responds with indifference, making a counteroffer: Zane will offer a him a senior partnership if Louis can steal a client from Jessica by breaking the Pearson Specter partnership agreement. After Mike foils Louis's attempt to poach a client, Harvey goes to Zane and asks him to hire Louis anyway as a personal favor to Harvey. After Louis becomes a name partner, Harvey visits Zane and retracts the favor, unaware that Zane already knows that Louis was not just reinstated at the firm, but that Louis told Zane that he was also immediately made name partner, igniting Zane's suspicions about the real reason behind Louis's abrupt departure and near-immediate return. In light of this, Zane makes clear to Harvey that regardless of the status of Zane's offer to Louis, Harvey still owes him a favor.

In season 5, Mike and Rachel are engaged, and Robert appears in several episodes. He tries to get Rachel to have Mike sign a prenuptial agreement, which Rachel does not want him to do. Mike tells Robert he is willing to sign it, but Rachel holds firm and refuses, nullifying it. In the episode 'Compensation' Mike takes on a case given to him by his friend Jimmy from Bratton Gould, a pro-bono class-action lawsuit against Kelton Insurance for the negligent deaths of 200 people. Jessica refuses to provide the funding necessary to support the case's inevitably long and complicated litigation and orders him to drop it. Mike, left without recourse, goes to Robert and asks him to take on the case. Robert agrees that Mike and he will co-counsel the case (to Jessica's dismay) and Robert is able to persuade one of his clients, a $20 billion hedge fund, to fund the lawsuit. The case is litigated over the next 2 episodes, and eventually they are able to extract a large settlement from Kelton.

In season 7, he merges with Specter Litt and forms Zane Specter Litt after realizing that his partners at the old firm did not have his back. He becomes managing partner after Harvey stepped down after Donna convinced him that he did not want to be a leader. Louis also does not want the leadership role but is upset because Robert and Harvey both do not consider Louis as a viable option.

=== Edward Darby ===
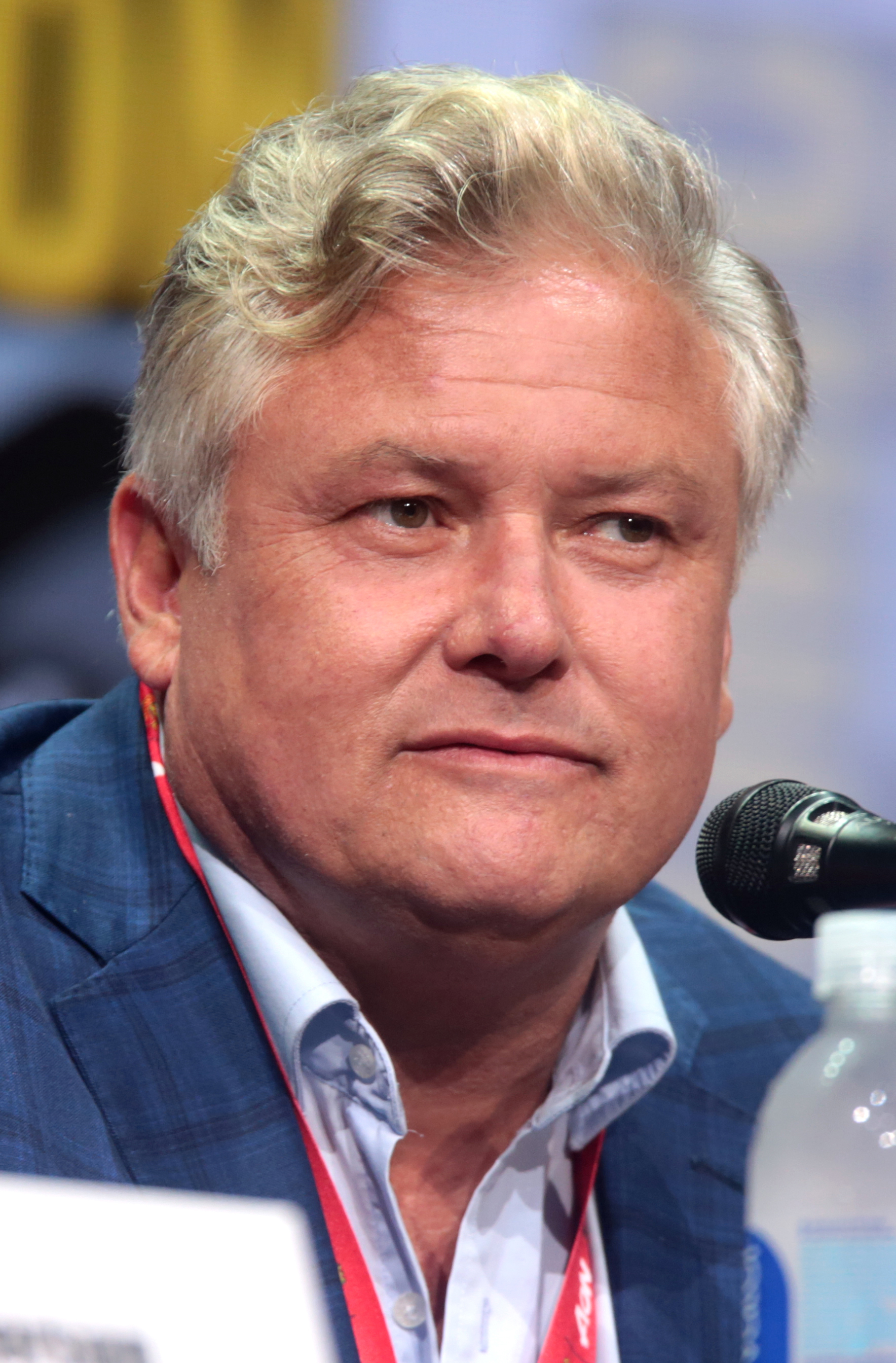
Conleth Hill

Edward Darby, played by Conleth Hill, is managing partner of Darby International, a law firm headquartered in London. He is Jessica's newly named managing partner as of the season 2 finale, following a successful merger of Pearson Hardman and Darby International. It is revealed in the season 3 premiere that the merger caused the firm to be officially renamed Darby Pearson (Darby retains 51% control over the combined firm, leaving Jessica as a 49% minority stakeholder), but as a show of good faith and chivalry, Darby let the New York office's sign read Pearson Darby. This was not only in recognition of Jessica's contingent having been there originally, but also that Pearson's staff, clients and influence make up the majority of the combined firm's presence in New York.

While Daniel Hardman is representing Folsom Foods against Jessica, Darby's intervention alone was responsible for the firm winning the case. Jessica could not reveal Daniel's prior embezzlement to anyone on her own without violating the confidentiality agreement she signed; as part of the due diligence of the merger negotiations, Darby is given access to the firm's financials, allowing him indirectly to learn of Daniel's past illicit actions while nullifying the confidentiality agreement's effects, which apply strictly to Jessica and her use of the information. (Since he learned of it legally and was not specifically bound by the agreement himself, he can reveal the embezzlement to anyone without the repercussions of breaching confidentiality.) After he discovers the embezzlement, Darby threatens to reveal this to Daniel's own client unless he immediately settles the case on Jessica's terms; left without options and his own reputation at stake, Daniel is forced to advise the company to accept her settlement terms.

In season 3, Darby assigns Harvey the case of Ava Hessington and Hessington Oil. Darby takes this case personally partly due to two factors: the first factor being Ava's father was his first client, and the second factor being her father was his former romantic companion. The case and the litigation involved continues for most of the third season, until it is discovered that Stephen orchestrated the killings of the protestors against the Hessington Oil pipeline in the EIR and Darby only found out after Stephen had done it, but that his discovery of Stephen's actions had taken place before he approached Jessica with merger proposal at the end of season two. During a recess from Ava's murder trial, Harvey finds himself boxed in without options, and Darby comes up with the idea to approach Cameron Dennis with an offer: Darby will plead to obstruction of justice and five years' probation, in exchange for Ava's full acquittal and Darby's testimony at Stephen's murder trial. Cameron agrees to the offer; but while signing the final paperwork at Pearson Darby's offices, Edward realizes that an additional condition has been added to the terms of the settlement: forfeiture of his legal license to practice in the United States, which would consequently force him to resign his name partnership in the combined firm and agree to initiate dissolution negotiations with Jessica. Unwilling to re-involve Ava and without recourse, he caves and signs the agreement.

=== Nigel Nesbitt ===
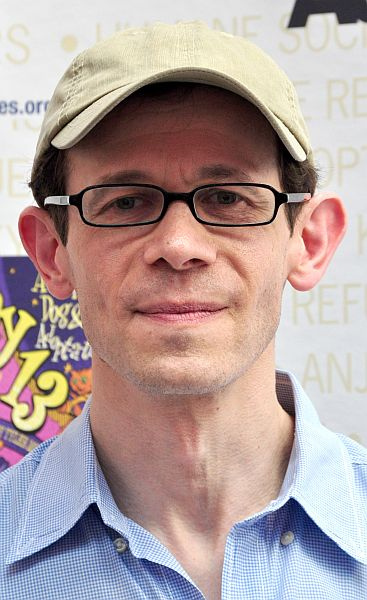
Adam Godley

Nigel Nesbitt, played by Adam Godley, is Louis' British counterpart, as he fills a similar role to Louis's at Darby International. He initially tries to make a deal with Louis to ensure each will keep his job after the merger goes through. But Louis backhandedly found a way to ensure that if one or the other had to be fired, it would be Nigel. Nigel managed to keep his job as quartermaster at the new Pearson Darby, then used the position to taunt Louis. Louis meets with Darby to present his case that he, not Nigel, would serve the firm best in the quartermaster role. Ultimately, Nigel reveals that he tricked Louis into stealing the quartermaster position, so that Nigel could then take over Louis's role and be in charge of the huge pool of associates at the combined firm. Nesbitt has cat called Mikado. His address is 3291 Belgrave Place, London.

In season 3, Nigel and Louis cross swords repeatedly, as Louis refuses to accept having lost his post as head of the combined firm's associates to Nigel. Louis acts as if nothing ever changed, calling his former subordinates into his office to reprimand them for mistakes in their work; though in reality, they are in most cases just following Nigel's directives. Nigel has a much more hands-off management style than Louis; He is often away on business overseas (whereas Louis is never really ever seen leaving New York or traveling on business) and issues his instructions and assigns cases through weekly memos. When Louis hears of this, he is outraged; believing that anything unlike his pedantic, humiliating, drill-sergeant manner to be an improper managerial style, he begins to regularly undermine Nigel's authority by issuing orders and distributing assignments to the associates contrary to Nigel's initial instructions whenever he is not physically present in the office. Louis confronts Nigel at the mud club, where he accuses Nigel of neglecting his responsibilities for overseeing the associates by not forcefully policing them. Nigel tries to explain his reasoning for his more subtle but firm approach; Louis refuses to accept any of it and declares that he is going to continue flouting Nigel's authority until Nigel adopts Louis's harsh, rude and overbearing attitude, and proceeds to melodramatically storm out of the mud club.

In response, Nigel retaliates at Louis by distributing a molded glass art piece engraved with the caption, "Louis Litt blew me" on it (Louis's own words during the confrontation at the mud club) to all of the associates, embarrassing him. This makes Louis even more angry, and he confronts Nigel, claiming that his own actions against Nigel are completely justified (him being the expert on handling the associates) while none of Nigel's responses are. This continues for most of the third season.

In the end, a mock trial is held to determine who should have possession of Mikado. After an emotional trial for Louis, Nigel approaches Louis with a settlement; Nigel will get his cat back, in exchange for Louis regaining control over the firm's associate attorneys. Rachel convinces an emotionally torn Louis to accept the settlement.

=== Stephen Huntley ===
Stephen Huntley, played by Max Beesley, is Harvey's British counterpart, a senior partner at Darby International's London office. He is Darby's "fixer" and right-hand man. Jessica tells Harvey of him, "He is to Darby what you are to me". After meeting him, Harvey admits to Jessica that they have much in common. He is, like Harvey, strikingly handsome and brashly confident (he also wears a handkerchief in the outer breast pocket of his suit jacket), and also appears to be fond of expensive clothing, fine dining, rare sports cars, and women. He states to everyone at the New York office (and Harvey initially) of being in town to help smooth out "cultural integration" between the two firms. He later reveals while out to lunch with Harvey that in reality he was sent by Darby to help Harvey take over the New York office for him from Jessica. He admits to Harvey that he is intrigued by Donna saying, "she has a body like Elizabeth Hurley and the sass of a Maggie Thatcher". He reveals that he dated Elizabeth Hurley in 1999; Harvey states that he had dated her the year before. He is later seen, while driving a 1956 Porsche Speedster (from Harvey's car club) attempting to ask Donna to see a production of Macbeth with Daniel Day-Lewis with him, and appears unsuccessful; but, shortly after, Donna accepts his proposal to help him with his "short-term needs" while he is in New York, and the two go on a real date. Further on, it is revealed that Stephen administered the bribe money to Colonel Moriga on behalf of Ava Hessington, while also (unknown to Ava) ordering the Colonel to murder six leaders opposed to Hessington Oil's pipeline. Harvey eventually cuts a deal with Cameron Dennis to have him arrested and charged with the murders, and he is publicly taken into custody while at a restaurant with Donna.

During the dissolution negotiations, while he is in prison awaiting trial, Donna and Mike visit him to convince him to recant a sworn, but false affidavit he signed at the behest of Travis Tanner, claiming that Scottie was fully aware of the murders before the initial merger negotiations. Tanner had drawn up the affidavit specifically to leverage Harvey into settling Ava's malpractice allegations against him by targeting Scottie for eviscerating scrutiny under oath while deposing her. Donna eventually convinces him to tell the truth, which he does (once Mike has left the room) unaware that, since the entire conversation is unprivileged, it has been fully recorded; this allows Harvey to confront Tanner with recordings from the conversation and neutralize the affidavit entirely.

=== Ava Hessington ===
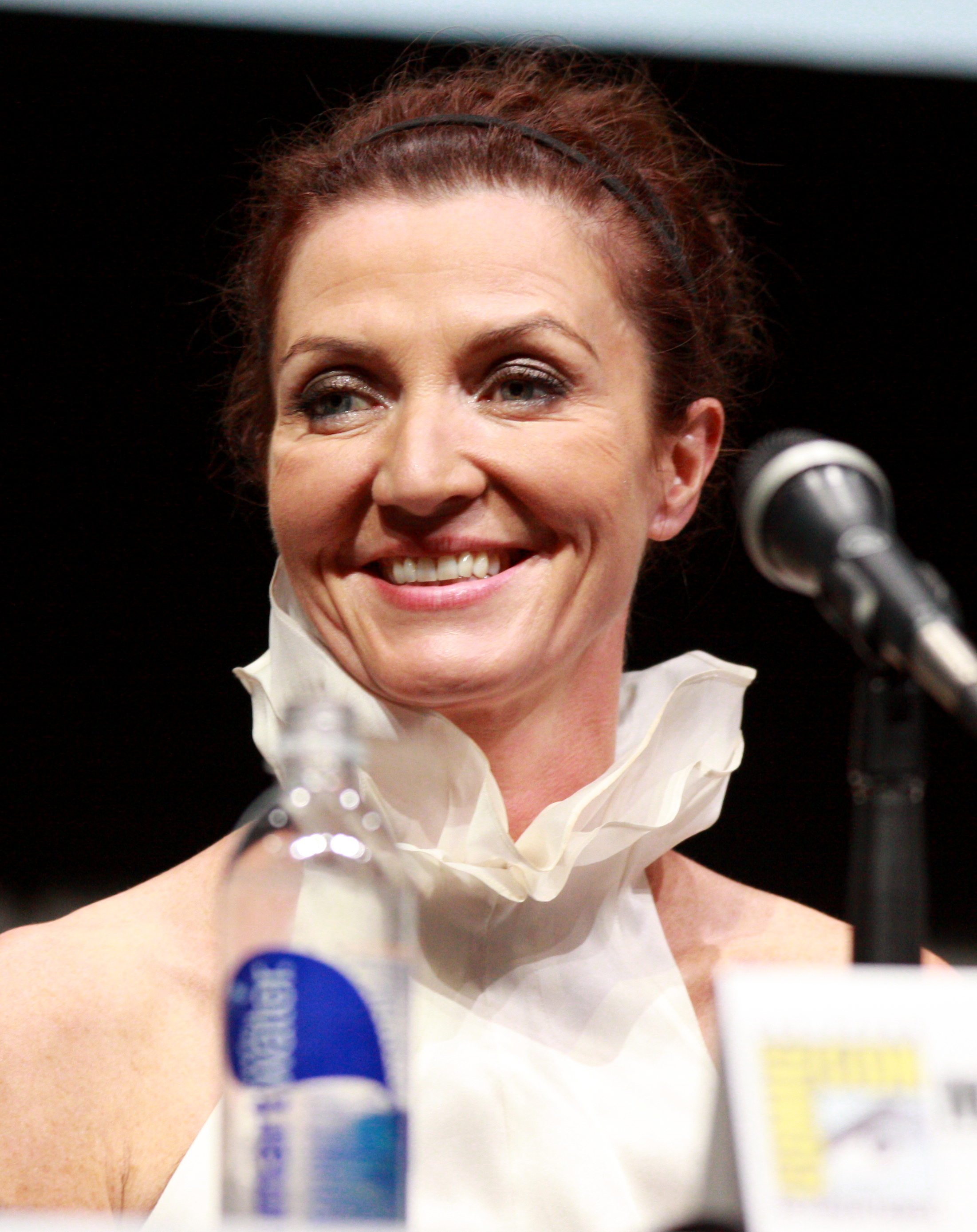
Michelle Fairley

Doctor Ava Hessington, played by Michelle Fairley, is CEO of Hessington Oil, a UK-based international oil company that she took over from her father. She has PhDs in petroleum exploration and chemical engineering. The local US Attorney's office is investigating her for bribing foreign government officials to gain access to their oil fields for a pipeline—a crime that she admits (to Harvey) to being guilty of, but something that is considered "standard practice" in the oil business, especially in countries that are less than politically stable. Harvey has Scottie look into her background and discovers that she bribed a corporate whistleblower in 2010, covered up an oil spill in 2008, and had an environmental study doctored in 2006. She and her father have been clients of Darby's firm for some time, dating back to her father being Darby's first client, as well as simultaneously being his lover. Her bribery case is assigned by Darby to Harvey, because of Harvey's familiarity with the sitting US Attorney prosecuting the case. She remains his client after being acquitted of the bribery charges and is later arrested for conspiracy to commit murder by Cameron Dennis (also someone Harvey is very familiar with).

After she is fully acquitted of all charges she leaves the country for a short time, but later reappears after hiring Travis Tanner to bring a relatively frivolous malpractice suit against Pearson Darby Specter, claiming Harvey's handling of her case caused her damages and hardship, in spite of Darby and Stephen's culpability in the murder charges and Harvey's non-involvement. After an emotional plea and a full apology in person from Harvey, she eventually agrees to fully drop the malpractice suit (to Tanner's grumbling dismay).

=== Jonathan Sidwell ===
Jonathan Sidwell, played by Brandon Firla, is the CEO of the Sidwell Investment Group, and Mike's boss as an investment banker for the first part of season 4. He first appears in the season 3 episode, "Conflict of Interest" as hedge fund magnate/corporate raider Tony Gianopolous's deputy at Gianapolous Limited Holdings (GLH). In his first scene, Louis meets with him to try to prevent Gianapolous from taking over Hessington Oil by providing proof of GLH's investments in a wide swath of several industries, enough to draw the FTC's attention for grounds to open an antitrust investigation. Louis threatens to use his connections at the FTC to do so unless Gianapolous backs off; Sidwell thwarts this by pointing out that the FTC's commissioner himself is a personal friend of Gianapolous's and has obtained an exception in regards to the Hessington Oil situation. He next appears in the episode "Bad Faith", once again meeting with Louis, who comes Sidwell with a proposal to reorganize all of Sidwell's finances in a manner to allow him to legally avoid paying taxes; Sidwell, impressed by Louis's demonstration, hires him on the spot to be his personal attorney, misunderstanding that Louis's intention is to get GLH to decide to move all of their business to Pearson Specter. Sidwell refuses to recommend that to Gianapolous, claiming Louis's professional stature is not significant enough to warrant his consideration. Louis goes to Harvey, knowing that his famous reputation and status as a name partner will likely be enough to convince Gianapolous, and they are successful.

In the episode "Heartburn" with Louis recovering from his heart attack and not present in the office, Sidwell seeks out Mike for some career advice. He confides that he wants to quit GLH and move to a different company, feeling that his career progress is stalling, but is aware that his employment contract contains a non-compete clause. Mike initially refuses to help, only conceding when Sidwell makes clear of his intention to fire Louis for not being able to help him. Once Harvey discovers what he did Mike is forced to derail Sidwell's plans, but then goes back to him with another idea, which manages to convince Gianapolous to let Sidwell go run a spun-off division as an independent investment firm which will boost the stock price of both entities.

At the beginning of season 4, Sidwell is the founding CEO of his own investment firm and Mike's new boss. He is portrayed as a straight-talking, concise, tough but fair boss to Mike. At the beginning, it seems that every conversation he has with Mike ends with him threatening to fire Mike unless he meets his pressing demands, but is shown later to become a bit of a mentor figure to him. In order to stay alive in the Gillis Industries takeover battle against Logan Sanders and Harvey, Mike is forced to buy 100,000 shares of Gillis Industries stock without Sidwell's prior approval. He summons Mike, compliments him on brazenly purchasing the stock without permission but gives him one week to find someone to refund the investment and deleverage Sidwell or it will cost him his job. Eventually, on realizing Mike's plan with Forstman of sidelining him from Forstman's investment, he fires Mike. Harvey goes to him the next day with a stock tip and tries to convince him to rehire Mike, but Sidwell refuses.

In Season 5, Harvey goes to Sidwell to convince him to enter a bidding war against his former mentor Tony Gianopolous to take McKernon Motors private.

=== Eric Woodall ===
Eric Woodall, played by Željko Ivanek, is a recurring character in seasons 3 and 4. First appearing in the season 3 finale as the US Attorney for the Southern District of New York, he has a reputation as a prosecutor who will use his position to bend the rules of the law and deliberately target and investigate certain attorneys in private practice whom he deems "dirty". After finishing a case that took 4 years to complete, he sets his sights on Harvey. He sends his deputies to corner Mike Ross on the street outside the firm's building to coerce Mike to voluntarily be taken in for interrogation without having received an arrest warrant; This way, whatever Mike says under questioning could be self-incriminating and be used by Woodall later to make a case against Harvey, without having basis for a case to begin with. Woodall tells him that he is investigating the disappearance of the foreign nationals who were supposed to have been witnesses in the Ava Hessington case that Mike and Harold settled out of court. Mike quickly recognizes what Woodall might be trying to do and refuses to talk to him or answer any of his questions long enough for Harvey to show up and force Woodall to release him.

Woodall later formally arrests both Harold and Mike, using the Patriot Act as basis for taking them in for questioning without processing him or allowing him to call his attorney, in violation of his 4th Amendment rights, hoping that will give him enough time to pressure Harold to break down, start talking and implicate Mike. This time Louis gets wind of what's going on and retrieves Harvey from his office before they both go downtown, hoping to get there before Harold caves. Eventually, they show up just in time and manage to keep Harold from talking. As the four of them leave, Woodall stops Harvey, telling him that he will not be dropping the case just because Harold did not talk. Harvey responds with indifference, saying that he will sue Woodall for malicious prosecution if he refuses to drop the case, noting that Woodall arrested Mike without letting him call his attorney, on the basis of deliberately twisting a provision of the Patriot Act and manufacturing a fabricated terrorist claim to justify doing so. It is understood that Woodall later was forced to resign from his position as US Attorney because of Harvey's reporting his actions to Woodall's superiors.

In season 4, Woodall reappears, now as a senior administrator at the New York office of the SEC. He has Sean Cahill file lawsuits against 7 PS clients in order to get them to drop the firm from representation. As part of the court battle, Harvey and Jessica depose Woodall, presenting emails from a past case from while he was US Attorney as proof to support their malicious prosecution claim against him. Under pressure during Harvey's interrogation, he admits that their proof is valid, after which Cahill immediately intervenes and ends the deposition. As they leave the conference room, he implicitly admits to Harvey that he is specifically going after him because of his vendetta against him.

=== Sean Cahill ===
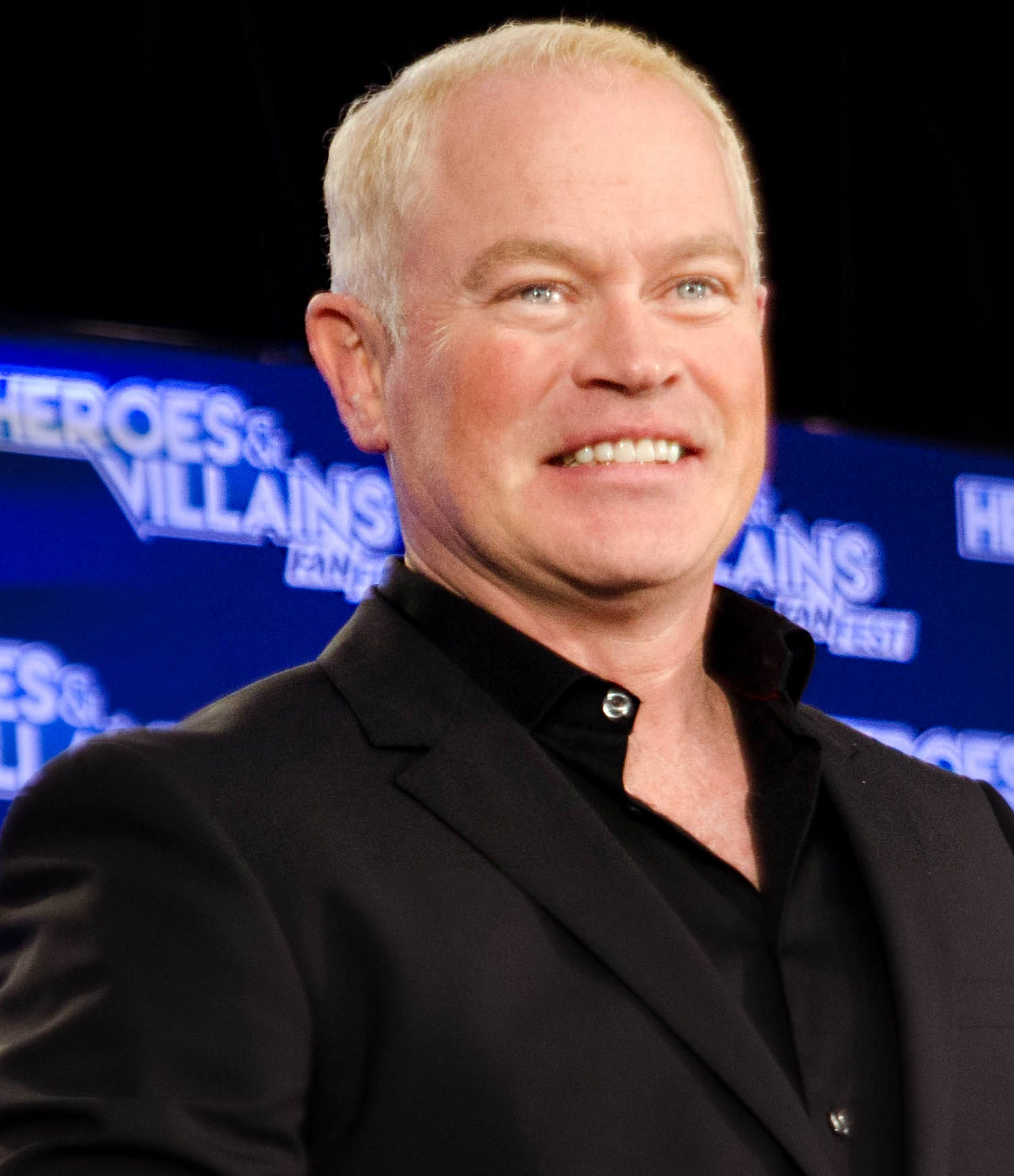
Neal McDonough

Sean Cahill, played by Neal McDonough, is a senior SEC official and long-time friend of Eric Woodall who first appears in season 4. He first appears in a meeting with Jessica and Malone at the SEC's offices where they confront him about the SEC's recently begun harassment of Pearson Specter's clients, likely on behalf of Eric Woodall, and inform him of their recently filed lawsuit against him. Cahill has launched a formal investigation against 4 major New York law firms; the only reason Cahill is targeting the other firms is to back a cover story in order to specifically target Pearson Specter clients but not be accused of unfairly singling them out for extra scrutiny, but still maintain that they are being impartial. The court battle between Cahill and the firm continues for the rest of the first half of the season.

After Woodall's deposition, Jessica and Harvey go to court in order to try to get the case dismissed based on proof that Woodall has a propensity for malicious prosecution, but Cahill thwarts her plans by telling the judge that Jeff Malone, the former SEC prosecutor whose last assignment was to target PS's clients, resigned instead of following instructions, and then virtually immediately took a job to work for Jessica. Cahill calls the coincidental nature of this into question by asserting that she did it so readily because she and Malone had been engaging in a clandestine romantic relationship. Confronted by this directly by Cahill in front of the judge, Jessica, though infuriated for being cornered with no way out under penalty of perjury, is left with no recourse other than to reluctantly confirm that Cahill's allegations are true. The judge responds by denying Jessica's motion, allowing Cahill to proceed with his depositions. He next deposes both Harvey and Mike simultaneously (without Woodall present), and tries to further probe and prove his collusion allegations. Mike and Harvey hold firm, noting that neither of them were financial beneficiaries of any alleged collusion and Cahill has no proof to the contrary; from this, Cahill comes to the conclusion that he must look elsewhere.

After Katrina brings Louis a copy of the deposition, Louis realizes that it is inevitable that Cahill will eventually find his illegal transaction with Forstman. He goes to see Cahill at his office, intending to confess in exchange for shielding the firm, but runs into Woodall instead, who sends Louis home after hearing his confession. Louis, having confessed to a felony to a senior federal official yet not charged, processed, or booked, is left perplexed, and goes and tells Harvey and Jessica, who come to the conclusion that Woodall must have done a deal with Forstman as well, and thus has no interest in investigating Louis's actions. After spending all night trying to find a link with no success, they go see Cahill in the morning, explaining their assertions of Woodall's collusion with Forstman, and make him an offer: they will give him hard proof of Louis's illegal collusion, but he must force Woodall to allow them access to his bank accounts and prove he has nothing to hide; if Woodall allows them, they are proven wrong and Cahill has all he needs to make an airtight case in court against Louis; if he refuses (indicating their assertions were correct), Cahill must agree to not prosecute Louis. Woodall walks into the room at the end of the conversation, and Cahill explains the situation and asks him to provide access to his accounts. Woodall hesitates in his response, first trying to shrug them off, eventually refusing altogether by pulling rank on Cahill; after a long pause, Cahill, realizing their assertions were accurate, asks them to leave him alone with Woodall.

Cahill returns in season 6 with a proposal for Harvey that could get Mike out of prison early, but it involves Mike informing on Kevin, his cellmate and only friend in prison. It is revealed that Kevin's father-in-law, William Sutter, is under investigation by Cahill for insider trading. Harvey takes on Sutter as a client in order to tank his defense, while secretly cooperating/colluding with Cahill. This continues for the rest of the first half of the season, and eventually Mike's deal goes through and he is released.

In season 8, Cahill returns when Harvey goes to him to try to cash in a favor to help Stu Buzzini, who is being blackmailed by one of his senior traders, Nick. In the end, Cahill cooperates with Harvey and neutralizes Nick's attempts to overthrow Stu.

=== Logan Sanders ===
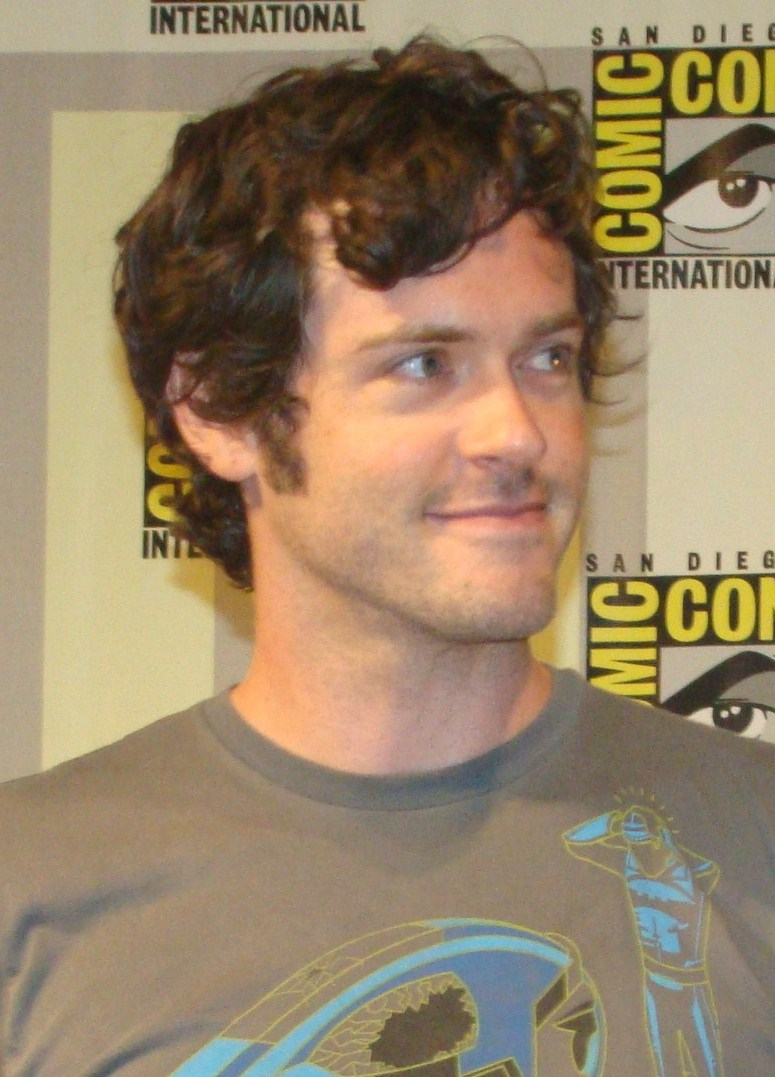
Brendan Hines

Logan Sanders, played by Brendan Hines, is a recurring character in season 4. First appearing in the premiere episode, he is the son of billionaire businessman Max Sanders, the founder and longtime CEO of Sanders International, and a client of Harvey's. Years before, he and Rachel Zane carried on an extramarital affair while Logan was married to his wife, Alison. They fell in love, but Rachel broke off the affair. Max has just recently decided to retire, appointing Logan to succeed him as CEO. Having had a longtime reputation as brashly confident, aggressive, and often reckless, he is eager to prove himself to Harvey and the world as a competent CEO to be taken seriously. Not having earned his respect yet, Harvey initially ducks Logan's calls to set up a meeting, forcing Logan to call Jessica and have her put it on Harvey's schedule, to Harvey's annoyance and dismay. Logan tells him he wants to pursue a hostile takeover attempt on Gillis Industries, which is coincidentally the same company that Mike had earlier pitched to Harvey, forcing Harvey to resolve a conflict of interest. He ends up choosing Logan, because Mike had also put Harvey's representation of the Sidwell Investment Group (Mike's employer) formally under review due to Harvey's earlier stonewalling of Mike's intentionally non-hostile takeover strategy of Gillis.

The takeover battle between Logan and Mike lasts for the first 6 episodes, and puts Rachel in the crossfire and adds an emotional side to the takeover battle, as it is clear that Logan's feelings for Rachel have been reignited in part due to them working together again, and he often tries to force emotions with her while doing so (despite her making clear to him of her present commitment to Mike). Logan's actions include requesting Harvey hire a private investigator to look into Mike. Knowing it is likely that his secret will be discovered, Harvey is forced to try to prevent that by thwarting Logan's request while still working towards winning the takeover. Rachel decides to go to Logan separately and manages to convince him to stop trying to win by pursuing personal attacks against Mike. Eventually, Logan wins the takeover battle and dismembers Gillis' company as originally planned, but once Harvey hears of Logan's inappropriate accosting of Rachel and her brief reciprocation, he makes clear to Donna of his disgust with both of their actions, and that he stands firmly behind Mike. Harvey eventually drops Logan as a client, once Louis rehires Mike back at the firm.

=== Jeff Malone ===
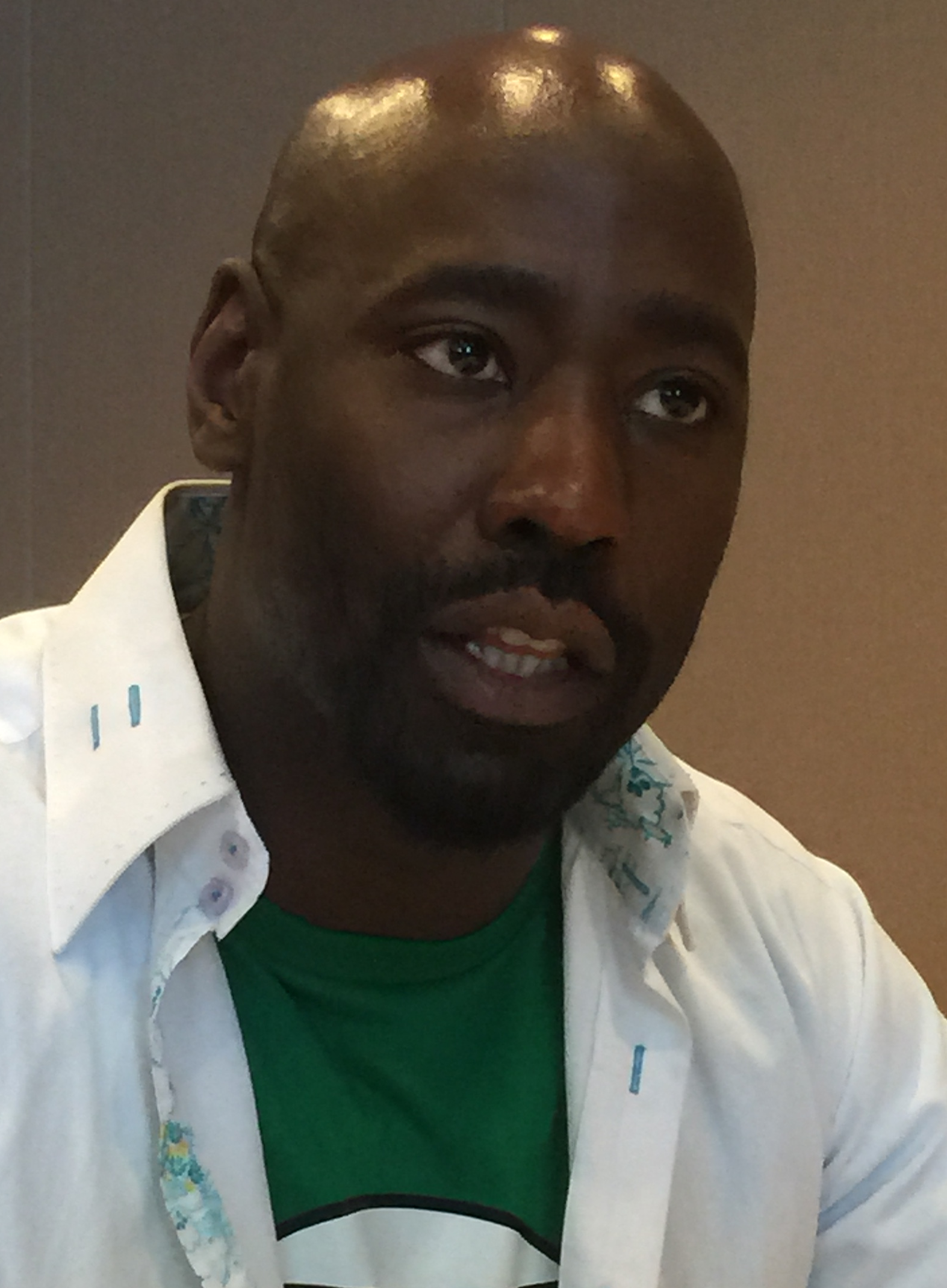
D.B. Woodside

Jeff Malone, played by D.B. Woodside, is a senior SEC prosecutor who joins Pearson Specter as a senior partner at the beginning of season 4. He is also Jessica's lover. First appearing in the season premiere, he shows up unannounced at the firm's offices to see Harvey and Jessica, who is well aware of his feared reputation as a career prosecutor at the SEC. He informs them that Eric Woodall will soon be taking a position as a senior official at the New York office of the SEC, and will be pursuing a vendetta against Harvey by using his position to deliberately target Pearson Specter clients with disproportionately invasive scrutiny (the SEC's purview does not usually include formally investigating law firms). Malone offers to leave his position at the SEC and lead Pearson Specter's defense against Woodall in exchange for a senior partnership. Jessica initially balks at the offer because she does not appreciate Malone ambushing her and banking on her secret romantic relationship with him as leverage to coerce her to hire him. She also had initially intended to assign this responsibility to Louis, but Harvey, impressed by Malone's brash approach, dismissively rejects the idea of Louis out of hand and convinces her to hire Malone instead. She does so but makes clear to Malone that the romantic side of their relationship is finished so long as they are colleagues.

Initially, Louis and Malone have a bit of an acrimonious relationship, due to Louis's bitter humiliation from being passed over in favor of someone who was just recently hired strictly for the purpose instead. Eventually, they put it behind them and become more friendly with each other. He constantly tries to force affections with Jessica, including getting Louis thrown off of a case in order to be able to work one-on-one with Jessica. She initially rebuffs his advances steadfastly, but later changes her mind. This makes for a very complicated dynamic and it eventually forces her to lie to him about Mike's status (and how it factored into Louis's becoming a name partner) in her capacity as his superior and thus puts their romantic relationship at risk. Eventually, Malone discovers that she had been lying to him about Louis (though not discovering Mike's secret) and breaks up with her, and resigns his senior partnership a few days later.

Malone appears in the season 5 episode "Live to Fight". Jessica approaches him at his new office requesting that he represent her, if need be, as her personal attorney in the ongoing court proceedings of Mike's fraud case. He is now aware of Mike's fraudulent status, with the criminal allegations against him being public information, and thus he now understands what she had been lying to him about. He initially balks at her request, insisting that he will only consider it if she confides everything in him before formally retaining him – making it unprivileged knowledge. At the end of the episode, he drops her as a client, but does tell her that he would be willing to consider resuming their interpersonal relationship if she approaches him.

In the season 6 episode "PSL", Jessica resigns from the firm and moves to Chicago to live with Jeff.

=== Charles Forstman ===
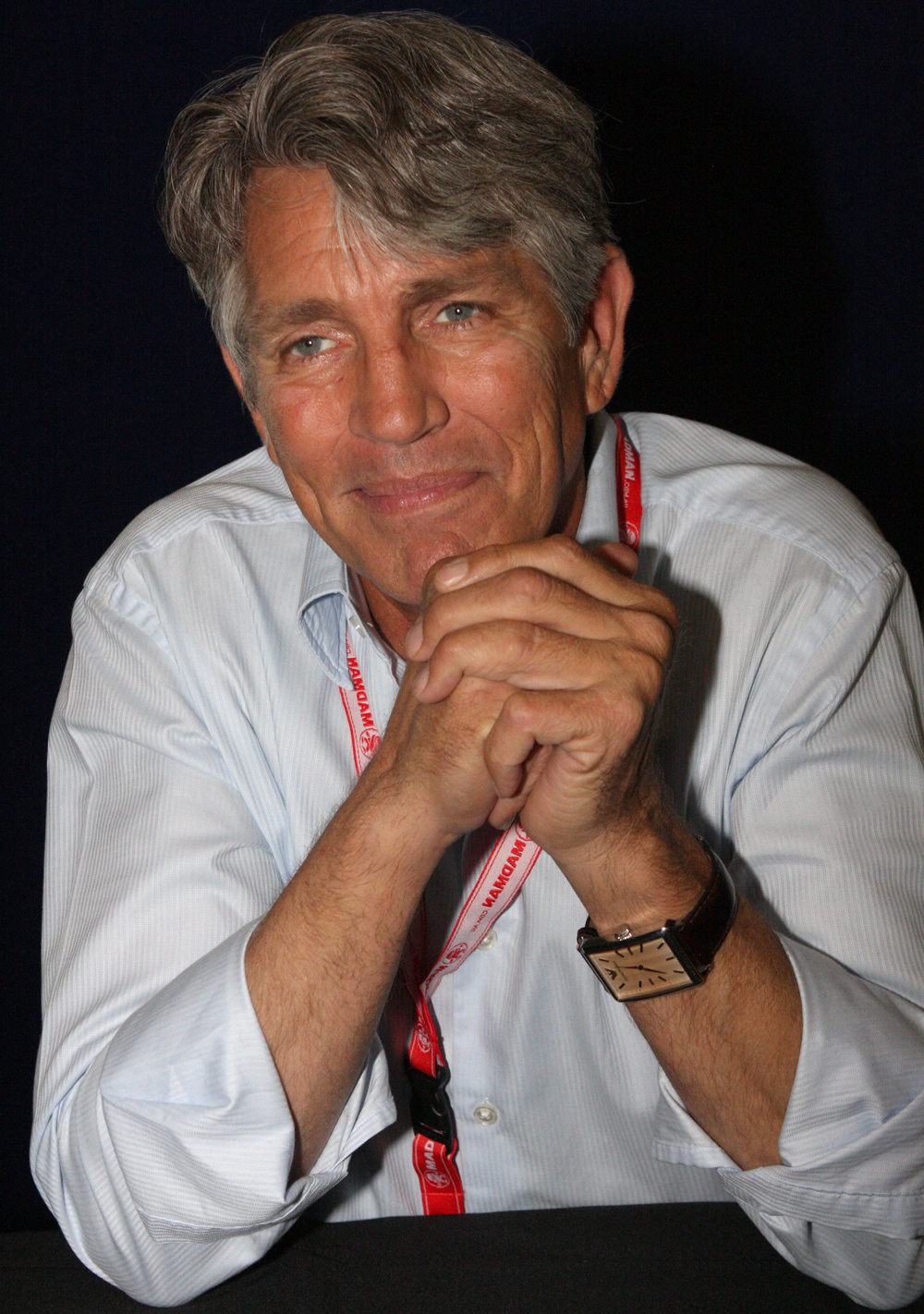
Eric Roberts

Charles Forstman, played by Eric Roberts, is a multi-billionaire investor and corporate raider who seems to reside in New York. First appearing in the season 4 episode 'Leverage', he is a ripe investment opportunity that Mike goes to as a last resort while trying to save Gillis Industries from a hostile takeover. A twisted and corrupt businessman, it is revealed that he has a widespread influence, and has done deals in the past with both Harvey Specter and Eric Woodall, the latter losing his job at the SEC at the end of "Gone" due to this relationship.

After Forstman does a deal with Louis Litt to sell the Wexler block to Logan Sanders and renege on his verbal agreement with Mike, Forstman's intention was to hire Mike afterwards, going so far as to sabotage Mike's relationship with Jonathan Sidwell, Mike's then-boss, to make sure that Mike got fired and would be left with little choice other than to accept Forstman's job offer. He offers Mike a $1 million signing bonus, and is surprised that Mike wants time to think about it. He forces Louis to wire Logan's payments through Switzerland and the Cayman Islands in order to illegally avoid US taxes. Louis wires the money as Forstman wants, but he also forces Louis to accept a $1 million fee for putting the deal together, as a form of self-protection for Forstman to cover his act of tax evasion. Louis signs the agreement anyway, implicating himself in an act of embezzlement. Louis later tries and fails to get the deal nullified when the SEC begins investigating Pearson Specter; Forstman tells him that he'd only reverse the deal if Louis could pin similar dirt on Harvey; Louis refuses. After Louis admits to Harvey and Jessica what he did, Harvey goes to Forstman to again try to convince him to nullify the deal and let Louis off the hook, noting to Forstman that Louis has never wronged him and his grudge is against Harvey, not Louis. Forstman acknowledges this, but still refuses to do so.

In the season 4 finale flashback scenes, Harvey's first encounters with Forstman 12 years beforehand are explained. Back while Harvey was an ADA at the Manhattan DA's office under Cameron Dennis, the first case he took to trial was a white collar criminal case which ended up with Forstman's biggest rival being sentenced to prison. Forstman sends Harvey a drink while they are at the same bar and offers him a job with a $1 million signing bonus. Harvey firmly but respectfully refuses the offer outright. But when his brother Marcus comes to him asking for $150,000 to open a restaurant, Harvey reconsiders, especially since Marcus tells him he will go ask their mother for a loan if Harvey cannot come through. Marcus also cannot get a bank loan, because he has a gambling problem that Harvey caused and it destroyed his credit rating. Harvey first goes to Jessica, who refuses and warns him about Forstman and his slippery reputation. Harvey finally goes to Forstman and explains the situation and tells him he wants to take his offer. Forstman initially refuses but impressed by Harvey's persistence and brash offer of a bet, he agrees to a wager: If Harvey can beat Forstman in a car race, he will give him the money.

But what Harvey did not realize was that Forstman was using the entire situation to con Harvey into revealing information on the status of a rumored yet publicly unconfirmed criminal investigation by Cameron Dennis against a major investment firm that Forstman holds a large stock interest in. Harvey implicitly confirms that Cameron will indeed press charges soon, unwittingly giving Forstman the heads up he was looking for to sell short and make $100 million before the company's share price inevitably tanked after the investigation was announced publicly. Harvey confronts Forstman after the market opens, realizing what he had done, and tells him that not only is he refusing his job offer, he is going to prosecute him as well. But Forstman had covered himself, and sent to Marcus the $150,000 for the restaurant directly, though making it appear that it had come from Harvey, knowing that he would not be able to muster the courage necessary to tell his brother the truth about the source of the money and give it all back once he had received it.

In season 5, Forstman appears in the episode 'Uninvited Guests' when Harvey visits him in prison to confront him about funding Daniel Hardman's renewed run at taking over the firm. Forstman admits to providing Hardman with full power of attorney over his assets for the duration of his prison sentence. But it becomes clear that there is a gap between Hardman's and Forstman's objectives; Hardman is using Forstman as a blank checkbook to target the firm's clients for hostile takeover and eroding Jessica's base of support among the senior partners in order to take over the firm from her. But Forstman is shown to be willing to ditch Hardman and cut off all of his funding immediately in exchange for Harvey's resignation from the firm. In the next episode 'Faith' after significant thought and consulting his therapist for advice, Harvey agrees to resign, and is shown at the vote of no confidence meeting presenting proof of Forstman's termination of Hardman's representation services.

=== Jack Soloff ===
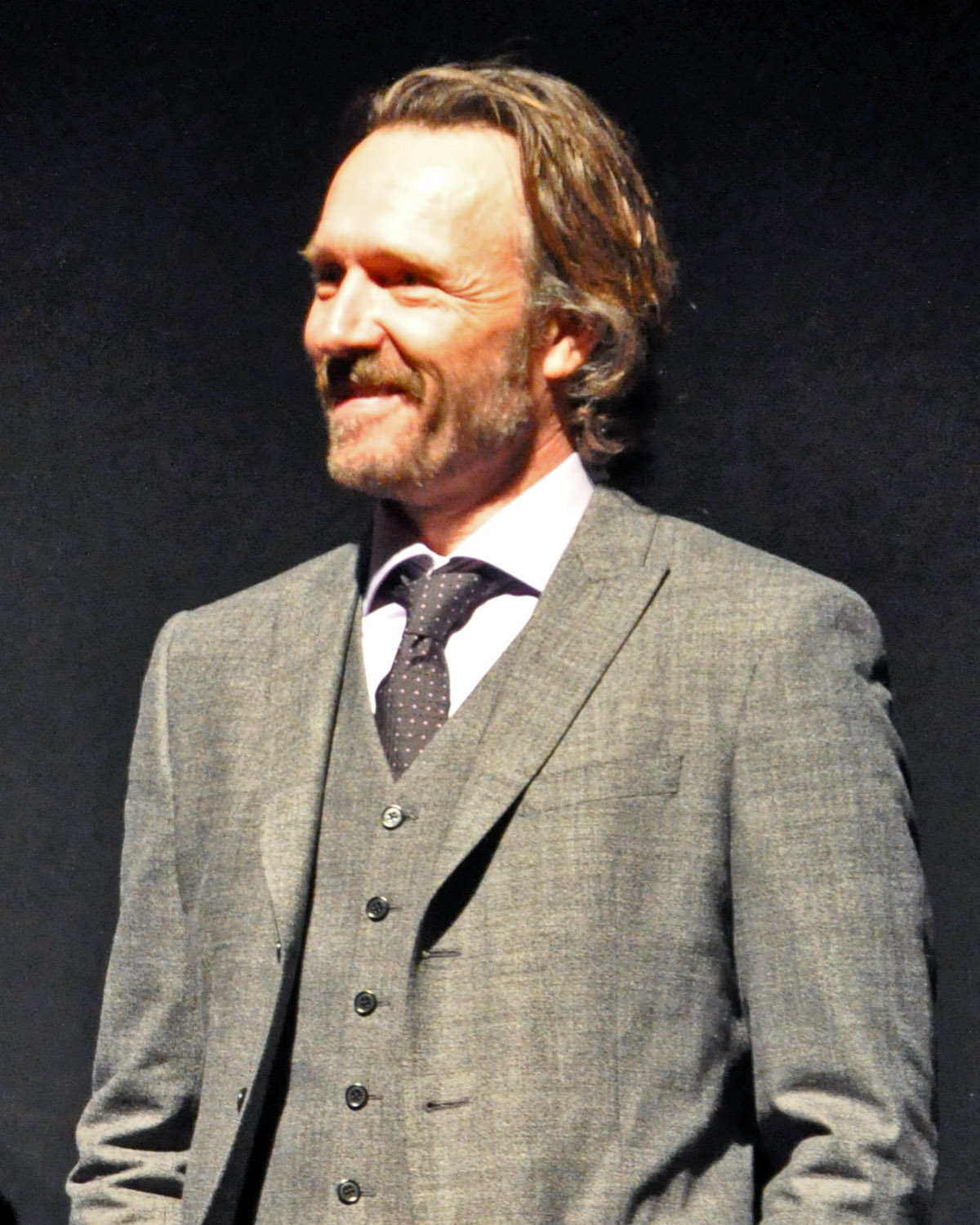
John Pyper-Ferguson

Jack Edward Soloff, played by John Pyper-Ferguson, is a senior partner at Pearson Specter Litt. He is first mentioned in the season 5 premiere, but does not appear in person until the episode 'Compensation'. Described by Louis as having "a pirate beard and a stupid pen that he carries around like Linus's blanket" he is the newly appointed chair of PSL's compensation committee. Brashly confident and ambitious, he comes to Louis to propose an alteration to the firm's compensation formula to put more emphasis on billable hours than on contingent fees, which Soloff is well aware would specifically target Harvey (who operates on a contingent fee basis) hoping to earn the respect of the partners and a boost in esteem by successfully picking a fight and beating the firm's de facto chief of staff and second-most-powerful partner. He is temporarily successful, and with Louis's help, he manages to illegally publicize Harvey's salary while maintaining deniability, humiliating him in front of the whole firm in order to get the support necessary to win a vote on his desired compensation alteration. He and Harvey battle for the next few episodes, with Harvey poaching some of Soloff's clients, and with Mike's help, eventually gets him to back off. Later that season, Soloff is shown to be complicit in Daniel Hardman's efforts to remove Jessica and regain control of PSL, using Charles Forstman's money, which causes Jessica and Harvey to become convinced that Hardman holds some kind of damaging information on Soloff. Soloff's efforts are neutralized, when Harvey resigns from the firm and Forstman cuts off Hardman's funding.

After Mike is arrested, Soloff goes to Jessica to propose a solution to the firm's crumbling reputation: a wide-ranging pro-bono campaign for their client's leading charities. Jessica is suspicious of his proposal, but agrees that something must be done to re-establish the firm's position as a leading law firm. She asks Soloff to find a department of a competing law firm that is willing to be poached, but the prospective deal falls through, and Soloff is offered a job instead. Soloff later goes to Jessica, and as a demonstration of loyalty, provides her with the damaging information that Hardman has on Soloff.

=== Gretchen Bodinski ===
Gretchen Bodinski, played by Aloma Wright, is the legal secretary whom Harvey eventually hires to replace Donna after she goes to work for Louis in season 5. At first, Harvey is hoping Donna will come back; when he finally accepts her departure, he looks for a replacement. Surveying the sexy younger applicants waiting outside his office, he immediately calls in Gretchen who, as an older African American woman, is the physical opposite of Donna. Harvey hires Gretchen and, though he has low expectations for her performance, she proves herself as capable and intuitive as Donna. Gretchen and Donna formally meet and clash in the episode "Privilege", but soon respect and even like each other as equals. When Donna goes back to Harvey, Gretchen becomes Louis's assistant.

=== Stu Buzzini ===
Stu Buzzini, played by Ian Reed Kesler, is a recurring character who first appears in season 6. He is the chief of the satellite division of the Stevens Investment Group, whom Louis brings in as a tenant to lease PSL office space after Mike is convicted and all of the partners leave the firm. Fast-talking, witty, with a taste for three-piece suits and a fraternity brother personality, he clashes with Louis immediately (much to Harvey's amusement) and they spar over difference in office etiquette and Stu's accidental disposal of Louis's prune juice and his consumption of Louis's treasured raspberry bran bars, provided a comedic side arc for several episodes. He mentions to Louis that he is a Yale-educated lawyer. He is later shown to be more moderate in tone and approach. After crossing Jessica on a favor, he returns to her with a peace offering, requesting that Jessica take him on as a client. She agrees, on the condition that Stu makes peace with Louis, which he agrees to.

=== Esther Litt ===
Esther Litt-Edelstein, played by Amy Acker, is Louis' sister who first appears in season 5. Louis convinces Harvey to represent her in her divorce negotiations. After the divorce is settled, she also sleeps with him. She later approaches Harvey again with a case but he dismisses her and convinces her to go to Louis. She also asks Harvey out for dinner after that but he refuses, causing her to become evidently upset which ticks off Louis, leading him to figure out they slept together. It is revealed in season 9 that she was sexually abused by her boss at the firm where she previously worked. When that firm is set to merge with her current employer, she is reluctant to come forward about the abuse now that she is married and has a daughter. Samantha, who suffered similar abuse in the past, convinces Esther to speak up.

=== Doctor Paula Agard ===
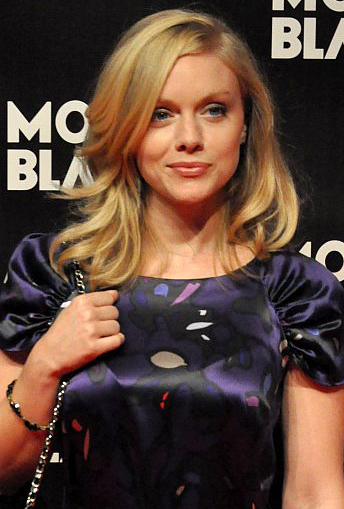
Christina Cole

Doctor Paula Agard, played by Christina Cole, is Harvey's therapist whom he visits after he starts having panic attacks as a consequence of Donna leaving him to work for Louis in season 5. After some struggle, Harvey opens up to her about his mother and his other issues. He sees her throughout seasons 5 and 6. In season 7, he asks her out for a date, no longer being her patient. They begin a relationship but it comes to an end when she makes him choose between their relationship and working with Donna.

=== Tara Messer ===
Tara Messer, played by Carly Pope, is an architect who is appointed to renovate the firm in season 6. She gets romantically involved with Louis while still in a relationship with another man, Joshua, who lives across the country in Los Angeles. She ends her relationship and is briefly engaged to Louis. She then discovers that she is pregnant however the father is Joshua her previous partner, however Louis agrees to raise the child as his own. After Louis shares Mike's secret with her, she later leaves him because of the way he treated her when telling her about it.

=== Brian Altman ===
Jake Epstein

Brian Altman, played by Jake Epstein, is the target of verbal attacks by Louis for wanting to leave the office to be with his wife and newborn child. Louis later realizes his abuse is triggered by jealousy, as he wishes to have a child himself, and not by Brian's performance. In season 8, Louis mentions that Brian is one of his favorite associates and tries to keep him from being fired by Katrina. Katrina fires him anyway, citing statistics that show Brian is underperforming as compared to other associates. Donna makes Katrina see that while some employees rack up accolades for themselves, Brian is the type of employee that makes those around him better. Katrina is convinced and rehires Brian. Later that season, Katrina is promoted to senior partner and asks Brian to be her personal associate. The two become close while working a case, putting Brian's marriage in jeopardy. They mutually agree to not act on their attraction, but Katrina later admits she still has feelings for Brian while Brian later insists he cannot just "turn off" his feelings for her. The two mutually decide at that point that Brian should leave the firm, with Katrina promising to help him land a good position elsewhere.

=== Faye Richardson ===
Faye Richardson, played by Denise Crosby, is appointed by the New York Bar Associations as a special master to oversee operations at Specter Litt Wheeler Williams in season 9, following the scandal surrounding Robert Zane's disbarment in the season 8 finale. Her "my way or the highway" approach rubs the remaining name partners and Donna the wrong way. The partners begin looking for any skeletons in Faye's closet that they can use to take her down, but it appears that she has very few of them.

=== Stan Lipschitz ===
Stan Lipschitz, played by Ray Proscia, is Louis Litt’s therapist throughout the series. Lipschitz helps Louis through many situations including his feuds with Harvey, his breakups with Sheila and with Tara and his childhood issues with his former bully, Chaz McManus.

Lipschitz, like Louis is of Jewish heritage although he is German which leads Louis to initially be skeptical of him although they soon begin working together. Lipschitz is often seen as a professional figure who frequently refuses Louis’ attempts to become close friends with him with things such as ‘weekend texting privileges.’ However at the end of the series Louis agrees to begin seeing a new therapist and the two become friends, with Louis even asking Stan to be the officiant at his wedding with Sheila.
