= Duff's Happy Fun Bake Time =

- Created by: Duff Goldman
- Starring: Duff Goldman; Geof Manthorne; Puppeteers: Dorien Davies; Donna Kimball; Amanda Maddock; Kenny Stevenson; Kristin Charney; Victor Yerrid
- Theme music composer: Matt Mahaffey
- Composer: Matt Gorney
- Country of origin: United States
- Original language: English
- No. of seasons: 1
- No. of episodes: 6

Production
- Executive producers: Duff Goldman; Halle Stanford; Jason DeVilliers; Lisa Henson; Lisa Shotland
- Production company: The Jim Henson Company

Original release
- Network: Discovery+
- Release: April 29, 2021

Duff's Happy Fun Bake Time is a TV series on Discovery+ that stars Duff Goldman. The show details Duff and his friends exploring the science of different foods.

It debuted on Discovery+ on April 29, 2021.

== Plot ==
In his kitchen/laboratory called Bakersville, Duff Goldman explores the science of the foods that he makes with help from his puppet and robot friends.

The segment "Science Bites" has Duff in his puppet form explaining food science. There is also a globe-trotting segment that showcases the cultural origins of food.

== Characters ==
- Duff Goldman (portrayed by himself) - A pastry chef that runs Bakersville.
- Couscous (performed by Donna Kimball and Kristin Charney) - A robot and Duff's sous-chef who is made of different kitchen tools.
- Dizzy (performed by Dorien Davies) - An elephant-shaped industrial stand mixer. She mostly sticks her mixing "nose" into everything.
- Dragon Oven - A dragon-shaped oven that speaks in roars, smoke, and hiccups.
- Edgar (performed by Kenny Stevenson) - A "crabby" blue crab that hails from Chesapeake Bay.
- S'Later (performed by Victor Yerrid and Amanda Maddock) - A brown three-toed sloth who has a wise personality.
- Proof Box (performed by Amanda Maddock) - A box that takes Duff anywhere in time to learn the history of certain foods.
- Geof (portrayed by Geof Manthorne) - Duff's musically inclined grocer who would sing about the ingredient of the day.
- Aliens (performed by Donna Kimball and Kristin Charney) - A pair of Aliens that threaten to destroy the planet unless Duff feeds them. They are recycled versions of two of the Koozebanians from CityKids.

== Episodes ==
No.	Title	Directed by	Written by	Original release date	Prod. code	U.S. viewers (millions)
1	"Pasta"	Jason DeVilliers	Unknown	April 29, 2021	101	N/A
When some special guests are planning to stop over at Bakersville, Duff and his friends work on making a pasta dinner for them.
2	"Chocolate"	Jason DeVilliers	Unknown	April 29, 2021	102	N/A
Duff and his friends try to lure a chocolate unicorn out of hiding.
3	"Bread"	Jason DeVilliers	Unknown	April 29, 2021	103	N/A
Duff bakes bread to save the planet from hungry aliens.
4	"Eggs"	Jason DeVilliers	Unknown	April 29, 2021	104	N/A
Duff and the crew bake a cake without eggs to see what will happen.
5	"Ice Cream"	Jason DeVilliers	Unknown	April 29, 2021	105	N/A
Duff and his friends cool a dragon's fiery hiccups with ice cream.
6	"Movie Snacks"	Jason DeVilliers	Unknown	April 29, 2021	106	N/A
Duff and his friends can't choose between salty and sweet snacks.

== Production ==
Duff Goldman collaborated with The Jim Henson Company to create this show on Discovery+. When Duff Goldman created this show, the inspiration he used to create this show came from the "Imagination Movers".
