= Valerie Bertinelli =

American actress (born 1960)

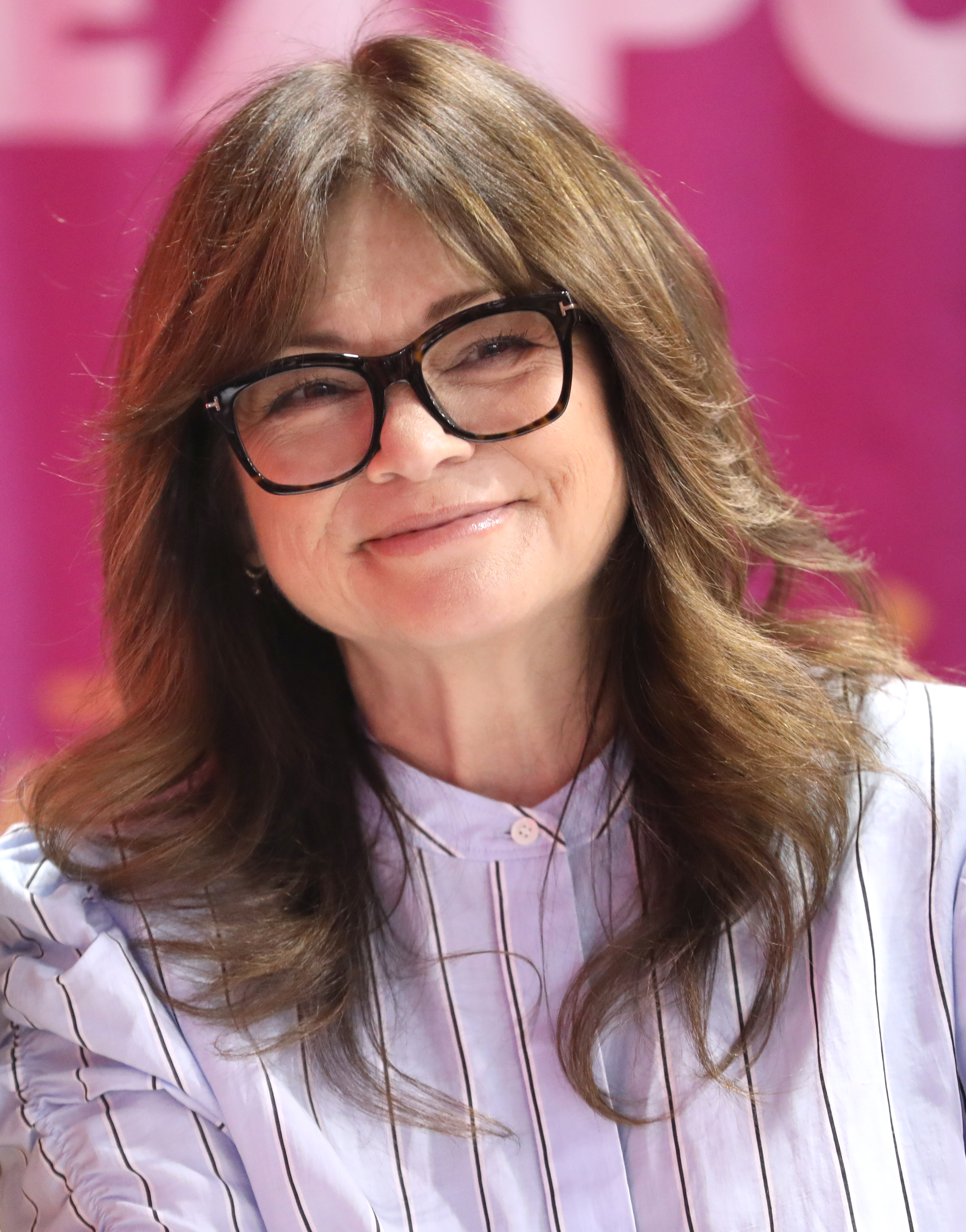
- Bertinelli in 2024
- Born: Valerie Anne Bertinelli; April 23, 1960 (age 66); Wilmington, Delaware, U.S.
- Occupations: Actress; television personality
- Years active: 1971–present
- Spouses: Eddie Van Halen (m. 1981; div. 2007) Tom Vitale (m. 2011; div. 2022)
- Children: Wolfgang Van Halen
- Website: valeriebertinelli.com

Valerie Anne Bertinelli (born April 23, 1960) is an American actress and television personality. She began acting as a child and made her screen debut in a 1974 episode of Apple's Way. She gained wide recognition for portraying Barbara Cooper Royer on the sitcom One Day at a Time (1975–1984), winning two Golden Globes for Best Supporting Actress. She also starred in several television films and played the titular character in the sitcom Sydney (1990).

Bertinelli earned adult stardom with the religious drama series Touched by an Angel (2001–2003) and the sitcom Hot in Cleveland (2010–2015), netting her a SAG Award nomination. She received a star on the Hollywood Walk of Fame in 2012. She has since hosted several programs for Food Network, including the cooking shows Valerie's Home Cooking (2015–2023) and Kids Baking Championship (2015–2024). She won two Daytime Emmy Awards for her hosting, and signed a deal with Food Network in 2021.

== Early life, family and education ==
On April 23, 1960, Bertinelli was born in Wilmington, Delaware, to Nancy (née Carvin) and Andrew Bertinelli, a General Motors executive. Her father is of Italian descent and her mother of English descent. Before she was born, an older brother, Mark, died when he was 17 months old from accidental poisoning. She was raised Roman Catholic. In 2014, she appeared on Who Do You Think You Are? and was informed that she is a descendant of King Edward I of England.

Due to her father's career, the family frequently relocated. They resided in Claymont, Delaware; Clarkston, Michigan; Shreveport, Louisiana; Oklahoma City, Oklahoma; and the Los Feliz section of Los Angeles, California, where Bertinelli studied acting at the Tami Lynn School of Artists. She attended Granada Hills High School but did not graduate.

== Career ==
=== Acting and television hosting ===
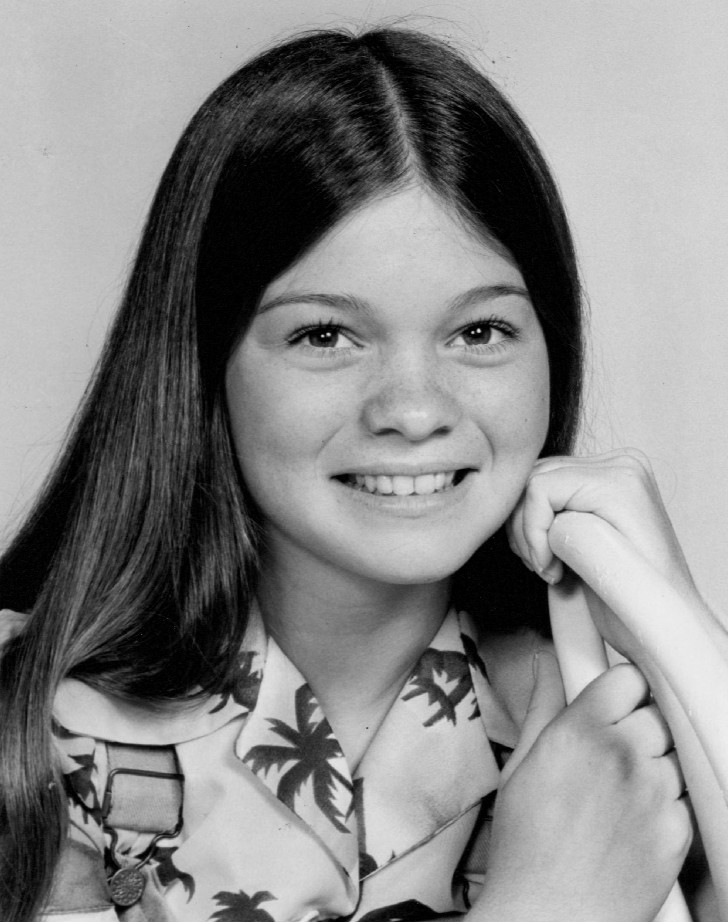
Bertinelli in 1975

Following her appearance in an episode of Apple's Way, Bertinelli was approached by producer Norman Lear to audition for the role of cooperative daughter Barbara Cooper in the sitcom One Day at a Time, which debuted in late 1975 when Bertinelli was 15. She appeared in 208 of the 209 episodes before it left the air on May 28, 1984, and she won two Golden Globe Awards for her performances. In the 2005 One Day at a Time Reunion Special, she was reunited with cast members Bonnie Franklin, Mackenzie Phillips and Pat Harrington Jr. to watch memorable clips from the show's nine seasons. They talked about actors who had appeared on the show as well as Phillips's drug problem, which had wreaked havoc on-set and caused Phillips to be fired.

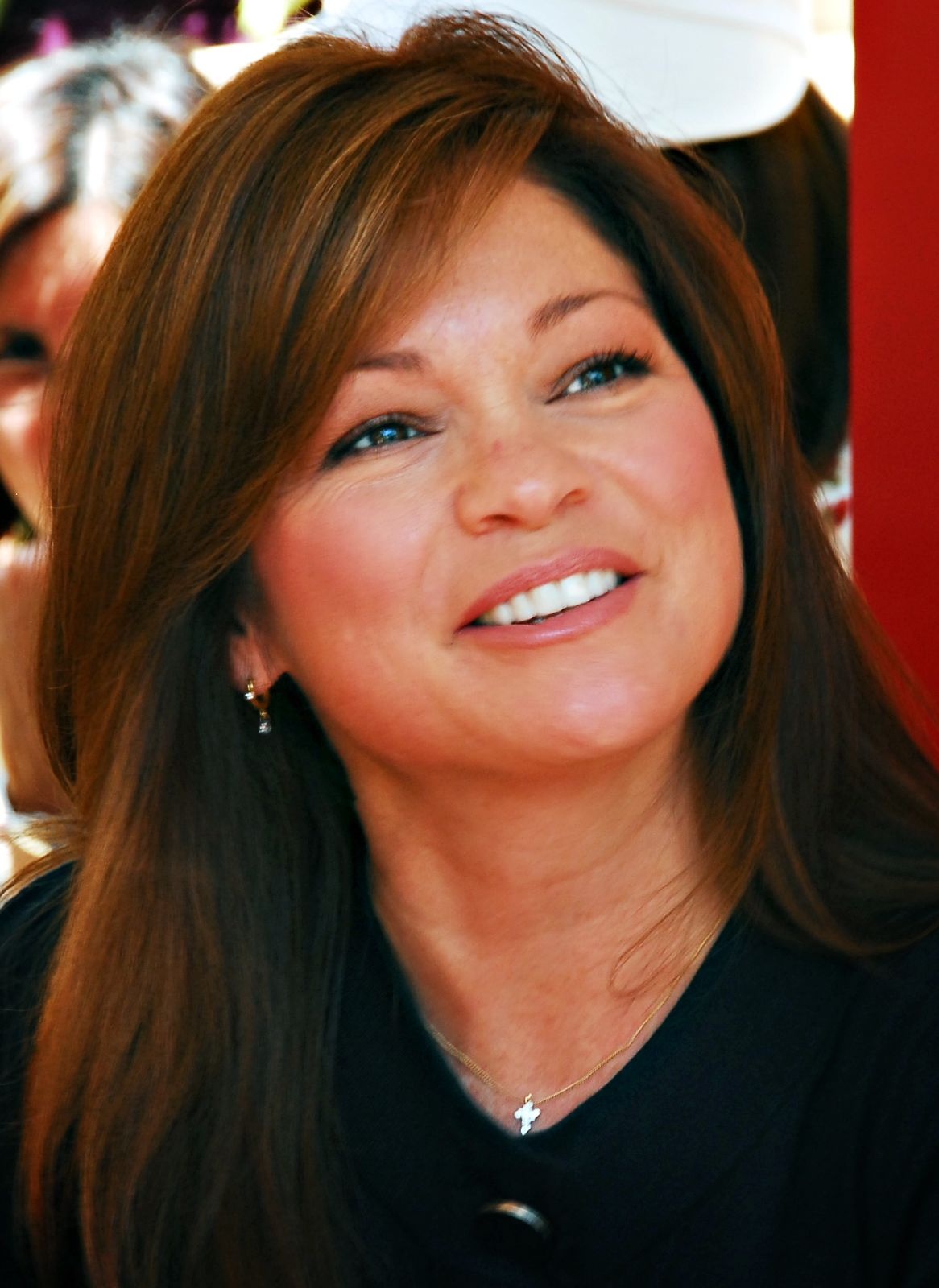
Bertinelli in 2008

After One Day at a Time, Bertinelli starred in several TV films and miniseries and made many guest appearances on other television shows. In the 1990s, she starred in two short-lived sitcoms: Sydney, as the title character, a private detective (with Matthew Perry and Craig Bierko); and Café Americain. In 2001, she joined the cast of Touched by an Angel for its last two seasons.

From 2010 to 2015, she starred in the sitcom Hot in Cleveland with Betty White, Wendie Malick and Jane Leeves. Its six-season run concluded June 3, 2015.

In 2015, Bertinelli began hosting cooking TV shows Valerie's Home Cooking and Kids Baking Championship with cake artist Duff Goldman on the Food Network. She won two Daytime Emmy Awards for her work on Valerie's Home Cooking. In 2019, she hosted two Food Network shows, Family Food Showdown and Family Restaurant Rivals.

In June 2021, it was announced that Bertinelli would star opposite Demi Lovato in NBC's single-camera comedy television pilot, Hungry. In December 2021, she signed a new deal with Food Network. In January 2024, she confirmed that she had been cut from Kids Baking Championship by Food Network.

=== Other ventures ===
In 2007, she became a spokeswoman for the Jenny Craig weight-loss program, and appeared in several commercials. The following year, she released her autobiography, Losing It: And Gaining My Life Back One Pound at a Time, which culminates in a description of her Jenny Craig diet experience. In 2009 she wrote a follow-up book, Finding It: And Satisfying My Hunger for Life Without Opening the Fridge.

Bertinelli ran in the April 2010 Boston Marathon to benefit the Dana–Farber Cancer Institute, completing it in a time of 5:14:37.

In January 2022, she released her memoir Enough Already: Learning to Love the Way I Am Today.

== Personal life ==
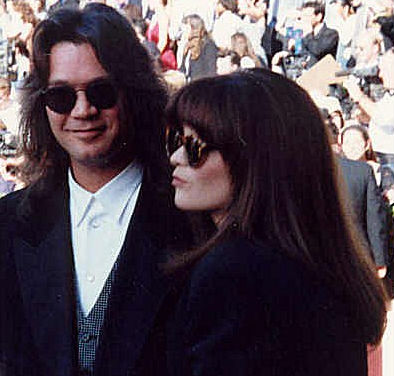
Bertinelli with Eddie Van Halen at the 1991 Emmy Awards

According to the biography of Paul Shaffer, he went on a "few fun dates" with Bertinelli when she was 16 and he was 27.

Bertinelli married rock musician Eddie Van Halen in 1981. She suffered a miscarriage in March 1986. They had a son, Wolfgang (born March 16, 1991). They separated in 2001 and divorced on December 20, 2007. In her autobiography, Bertinelli wrote that the main reasons for her divorce were her husband's cocaine addiction, and his refusal to quit smoking despite being diagnosed with oral cancer and losing one-third of his tongue in the treatment process. After their divorce, they remained amicable, and she was at his bedside when he died.

In May 2010, Bertinelli announced her engagement to financial planner Tom Vitale, with whom she had begun a relationship in 2004. They were married on January 1, 2011, in Malibu, California. She had four step-children through her marriage to Vitale. Both her ex-husband, Eddie Van Halen, and their son, Wolfgang Van Halen, attended the wedding. Bertinelli filed for legal separation from Vitale on November 24, 2021, citing irreconcilable differences. Their divorce was finalized on November 22, 2022.

== Filmography ==
=== Film ===
Year	Title	Role	Notes
1979	C.H.O.M.P.S.	Casey Norton	
1987	Number One with a Bullet	Teresa Barzak	

=== Television ===
Year	Title	Role	Notes
1974	Apple's Way	Peggy	episode: "The Flag"
1975–1984	One Day at a Time	Barbara Cooper Royer	main role
1977	Battle of the Network Stars III	Herself on The CBS Team	ABC special
1978	The CBS Festival of Lively Arts for Young People	Mamie Dickens	episode: "The Secret of Charles Dickens"
1978	The Hardy Boys	Wendy Chase/Gwynn	episode: "Campus Terror"
1978	The Magic of David Copperfield	Herself	CBS special
1979	Young Love, First Love	Robin Gibson	TV movie
1979	The Magic of David Copperfield II	Herself	CBS special
1980	The Promise of Love	Kathy Wakeman	TV movie
1981	The Princess and the Cabbie	Joanna James	TV movie
1981–1982	Fridays	Herself/Host	2 episodes
1982	I Was a Mail Order Bride	Kate Tosconi	TV movie
1984	The Seduction of Gina	Gina Breslin	TV movie
1984	Shattered Vows	Mary Gilligan	TV movie
1985	Silent Witness	Anna Dunne	TV movie
1986	Ordinary Heroes	Maria	TV movie
1986	Faerie Tale Theatre	Princess Sabrina	episode: "Aladdin and His Wonderful Lamp"
1986	Rockabye	Susannah Bartok	TV movie
1987	Saturday Night Live	Herself/Host	
1987	I'll Take Manhattan	Maxime "Maxi" Amberville-Cipriani	TV miniseries
1988	Pancho Barnes	Pancho Barnes	TV movie
1989	Taken Away	Stephanie Monroe	TV movie
1990	Sydney	Sydney Kells	13 episodes
1991	In a Child's Name	Angela Silvano-Cimarelli	TV movie
1992	What She Doesn't Know	Molly Kilcoin	TV movie, a.k.a. Shades of Gray
1993	Murder of Innocence	Laurie Wade	TV movie
1993–1994	Café Americain	Holly Aldridge	18 episodes
1995	The Haunting of Helen Walker	Helen Walker	TV movie
1996	A Case for Life	Kelly Porter	TV movie
1996	Two Mothers for Zachary	Jody Ann Shaffell	TV movie
1997	Night Sins	SBI Agent Megan O'Malley	TV movie
2000	Personally Yours	Susannah Stanton	TV movie, a.k.a. Wilderness Love
2001–2003	Touched by an Angel	Gloria	59 episodes
2001	Family Guy	Herself (as TV Bonnie)	episode: "Ready, Willing and Disabled"
2003	Crazy Love	Wife	TV movie
2003	Finding John Christmas	Kathleen McAllister	TV movie
2004	Saved!	Herself	cameo
2007	Claire	Claire Bannion	TV movie
2008	True Confessions of a Hollywood Starlet	Aunt Trudy	TV movie
2008	Boston Legal	Carol Hober	episode: "Mad Cows"
2010–2015	Hot in Cleveland	Melanie Moretti	main role
2013	Hollywood Game Night	Herself	episode: "Don't Kill My Buzz-er"
2013	Iron Chef America	Herself/Judge	episode: "Battle Oktoberfest"
2014	Signed, Sealed, Delivered	Rebecca Starkwell	2 episodes
2015	Cutthroat Kitchen	Herself/Guest Judge	episode: "Who Tarted?"
2015–2023	Valerie's Home Cooking	Herself/Host	
2015–2024	Kids Baking Championship	Herself/Host/Judge	
2016	Food Network Star	Herself/Guest Judge	episode 12.1
2019	Family Food Showdown	Herself/Host	
2019	Family Restaurant Rivals	Herself/Host	
2021	Hungry	Lisa	Lead role; unaired pilot
2024–present	The Drew Barrymore Show	Herself/Correspondent	
2025–present	Bingo Blitz	Herself/Host	

=== Music video ===
Year	Title	Artist	Notes
2023	"I'm Alright"	Mammoth WVH	Employee at entrance

== Awards and nominations ==
On August 22, 2012, Bertinelli received the 2,476th star on the Hollywood Walk of Fame.

The following is a list of awards and nominations received by Bertinelli.

Year	Award	Category	Work	Result
1981	Young Artist Awards	Best Young Comedienne	One Day at a Time	Nominated
1981	Golden Globe Awards	Best Supporting Actress in a Series, Miniseries or Motion Picture Made for Television	One Day at a Time	Won
1982	Golden Globe Awards	Best Supporting Actress in a Series, Miniseries or Motion Picture Made for Television	One Day at a Time	Won
1983	Golden Globe Awards	Best Performance by an Actress in a Supporting Role in a Series, Miniseries or Motion Picture Made for Television	One Day at a Time	Nominated
2005	TV Land Awards	Favorite Singing Siblings	One Day at a Time	Nominated
2007	TV Land Awards	Lady You Love to Watch Fight for Her Life in a Movie of the Week	—N/a	Won
2011	Screen Actors Guild Awards	Outstanding Performance by an Ensemble in a Comedy Series	Hot in Cleveland	Nominated
2018	Daytime Emmy Awards	Outstanding Culinary Program	Valerie's Home Cooking	Nominated
2019	Daytime Emmy Awards	Outstanding Culinary Program	Valerie's Home Cooking	Won
2019	Daytime Emmy Awards	Outstanding Culinary Host	Valerie's Home Cooking	Won
2020	Daytime Emmy Awards	Outstanding Culinary Host	Valerie's Home Cooking	Nominated
2020	Daytime Emmy Awards	Outstanding Culinary Program	Valerie's Home Cooking	Nominated
2021	Daytime Emmy Awards	Outstanding Culinary Host	Valerie's Home Cooking	Nominated
2023	Children's and Family Emmy Awards	Outstanding Host	Kids Baking Championship	Nominated
