= Duff Goldman =

American chef

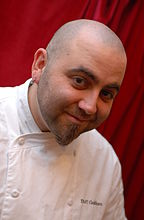
- Born: Jeffrey Adam Goldman; December 17, 1974 (age 51); Detroit, Michigan, U.S.
- Education: University of Maryland, Baltimore County (B.A.); The Culinary Institute of America
- Spouse: Johnna Colbry (m. 2019)
- Children: 2
- Culinary career
- Current restaurant: Charm City Cakes (Baltimore, Maryland)
- Television shows: Buddy vs. Duff; Ace of Cakes; Donut Showdown; Duff Till Dawn; Holiday Baking Championship; Kids Baking Championship; Spring Baking Championship; Summer Baking Championship; Sugar Showdown; Worst Bakers in America; Ace of Taste; Guy's Grocery Games; Super Mega Cakes

Jeffrey Adam "Duff" Goldman (born December 17, 1974) is an American businessman, pastry chef, television personality, and writer. He is the executive chef of Baltimore’s Charm City Cakes shop, which was featured in the Food Network reality television show Ace of Cakes, and Los Angeles’s Charm City Cakes West, which was featured in Food Network's Duff Till Dawn and "Cake Masters" series. His work has also been featured on the Food Network Challenge, Iron Chef America, Oprah, The Tonight Show with Jay Leno, Man v. Food, Buddy vs. Duff, Duff Takes the Cake, and Duff's Happy Fun Bake Time.

== Early life ==
Goldman was born in Detroit, Michigan, to a Jewish family. Goldman's nickname Duff came about when he was a baby. His toddler brother, Willie Goldman, was unable to pronounce Jeffrey and kept saying Duffy. When he was four years old, his mother caught him in her kitchen wielding a meat cleaver and watching food personality Chef Tell.

After his parents divorced when he was ten, Goldman lived in Northern Virginia and in Sandwich, Massachusetts, on Cape Cod. From age fourteen, he began to work in kitchens; his first job was at a bagel store at a mall. Goldman also worked as a fry cook at McDonald's.

In 1992, Goldman attended McLean High School in McLean, Virginia, where he played on the Highlanders ice hockey team. In 1993, he graduated from Sandwich High School.

== Education ==
Goldman attended the University of Maryland, Baltimore County (UMBC). He has said that when he was a sophomore in college, he went to the restaurant Charleston, which he considered the finest restaurant in Baltimore. Aspiring to be a cook there, he applied. The head chef, Cindy Wolf, looked at his résumé and noted that it consisted of irrelevant experience. However, Cindy did offer him a job to make cornbread and biscuits only, and this is what Goldman cites as the turning point in his career. Goldman earned a bachelor's degree in East Asian History with a minor in Ethics from UMBC.

Thereafter, Goldman attended Corcoran College of Art and the Culinary Institute of America at Greystone in Napa Valley, California.

== Professional career ==
Goldman worked under acclaimed chefs in California, including a stagiaire position at the French Laundry and as executive pastry chef of the Vail Cascade Hotel in Colorado, he returned to Washington, D.C., to work at Todd English's restaurant, Olives, baking bread.

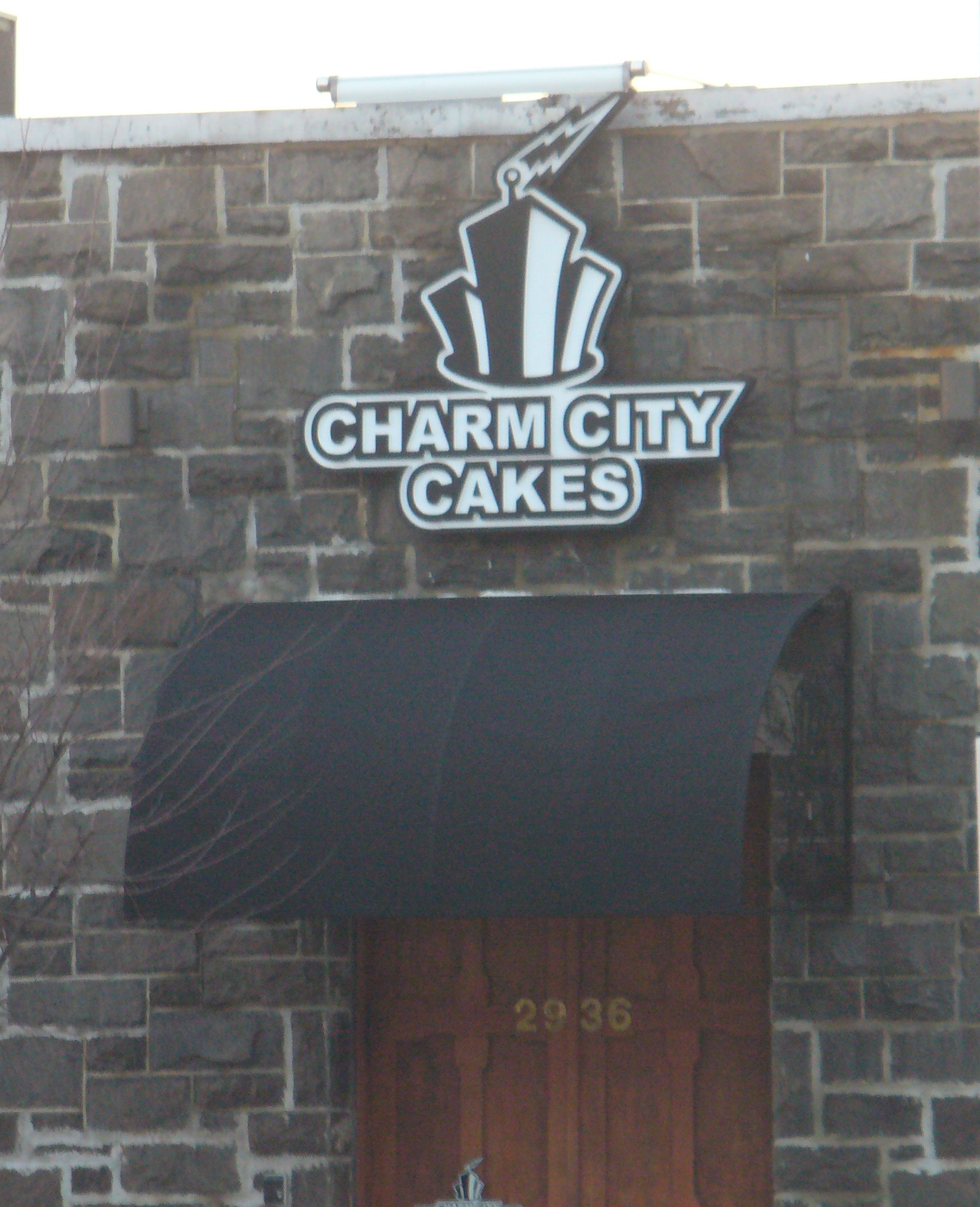
Charm City Cakes

In 2002, Goldman made forays into the food industry when he started his own business by opening his own bakery called Charm City Cakes. Initially, his cake sales began as he worked out of his house in Charles Village in Baltimore, Maryland, with the help of two assistants he employed. As demand grew, he hired more employees, hiring painters, architects, and sculptors to work on the development and expansion of his bakery. Charm City Cakes frequently uses blow torches, as well as power tools such as grinders and drills to help create the underlying supports of cakes.

Goldman has made cakes for former President Barack Obama during his second inaugural ball in 2013, novelist Tom Clancy, the cast of Lost, the 30 Rock cast (along with a cake prop), actor Sir Roger Moore, and for pop singer Katy Perry's "Birthday" video.

In 2022, Goldman competed in season seven of The Masked Singer as "McTerrier" of Team Good. After the performance of Loverboy's "Working for the Weekend", McTerrier's mask accidentally came off and he had to shield his head while the panelists shielded their eyes until a crew member had to run out and put the mask back on. He was the first to be eliminated.

Goldman is a judge on several Food Network cooking competitions, such as Holiday Baking Championship, Spring Baking Championship and Kids Baking Championship. He co-hosted the last show with Valerie Bertinelli from seasons 1-12, and with Kardea Brown in season 13.

Duff has appeared in Guy's Grocery Games - most notably the episode titled Delivery: All-Star Hanukkah, in which he competed against Aaron May and Eric Greenspan, and the judges were Antonia Lofaso, Catherine McCord, and Jonathan Waxman, all of whom are of Jewish descent, except for Ms. McCord, whose husband is Jewish.

== Personal life ==
As of 2021, Goldman lives in Los Angeles, California. He played bass guitar in an indie-rock band called "...soihadto...". He later became the bass player in the band Foigrock (a play on foie gras and rock and roll). He states his alternate dream job would be to perform as a bass player with the band Clutch. Goldman has made a wedding cake for Clutch's lead singer, Neil Fallon. In addition, Fallon's younger sister and Goldman's friend from college, Mary Alice Fallon-Yeskey, works at Charm City Cakes as the office manager.

Goldman is Jewish and enjoys giving back to the community. In an interview with Hillel: The Foundation for Jewish Campus Life, Goldman said "Tzedakah is very important to me. I’ve been so fortunate with everything that has happened to me, it would be a crime not to give back." On September 25, 2019, Goldman spoke at Cornell University, discussing the importance of Jewish identity and tzedakah in his life.

In 2012, Goldman lost toes in a motorcycle accident.

On April 2, 2018, Goldman proposed to Johnna Colbry, whom he later married in January 2019. In January 2021, their daughter was born. In March 2026, their son was born.

== Bibliography ==
- 2009, Ace of Cakes: Inside the World of Charm City Cakes,
- 2015, Duff Bakes: Think and Bake Like a Pro at Home
- 2020, Super Good Baking for Kids

== Filmography ==
- Cake Masters (2016)
- Duff Till Dawn (2015)
- Ace of Cakes (2006–2011)
- Holiday Baking Championship (2014–)
- Imagination movers (2006)
- Iron Chef America (2005)
- Kids Baking Championship (2014–)
- Spring Baking Championship (2015–)
- Worst Bakers in America (2016–2019)
- Dessert Games (2017)
- Buddy vs. Duff (2019–2021)
- Duff Takes the Cake (2019–2020)
- Double Dare (2019)
- Ryan's Mystery Playdate (2019)
- Unfiltered (2020)
- Duff's Happy Fun Bake Time (2021)
- The Masked Singer (2022)
- A Gingerbread Christmas (2022)
- Summer Baking Championship (2023–)
- Guy's Grocery Games Delivery
- The Tiny Chef Show (2025)

== Awards and nominations ==
| Year | Award | Category | Work | Result | Refs |
|---|---|---|---|---|---|
| 2023 | Children's and Family Emmy Awards | Outstanding Host | Kids Baking Championship | Nominated | |
