= Kids Baking Championship =

American food reality television series

- Presented by: Valerie Bertinelli; Duff Goldman; Kardea Brown
- Country of origin: United States
- Original language: English
- No. of seasons: 13
- No. of episodes: 109

Production
- Running time: 42-45 minutes
- Production company: Levity Entertainment Group

Original release
- Network: Food Network
- Release: February 2, 2015 – present

Kids Baking Championship is a competitive reality baking program produced by Levity Entertainment Group for the Food Network. Each week, the children compete to make the best dish, and are judged on presentation, taste, and creativity. The series is hosted and judged by baker Duff Goldman and actress Valerie Bertinelli in seasons 1 through 12, and by Duff Goldman chef Kardea Brown in season 13.

Most seasons have had 12 contestants, while some have had as few as eight. Unlike most "Baking Championship" series, each episode has only one challenge instead of two. In most seasons, the prizes awarded along with the title of "Kids Baking Champion" have been $25,000 in cash and a feature in Food Network Magazine. Seasons two and three did not include the article, while in season one the winner received $10,000 and a full kitchen remodel for their parents' house instead of the $25,000; in addition, a re-creation of their winning cake was sold by Goldman's bakery Charm City Cakes.

The seventh season premiered on August 5, 2019. On November 19, 2020, it was announced that the ninth season would premiere on December 28, 2020. On November 18, 2021, it was announced that the tenth season would premiere on December 27, 2021.

== Series overview ==
Season	Episodes	Originally released	
Season	Episodes	First released	Last released
1	4	February 2, 2015	February 23, 2015
2	8	January 4, 2016	February 22, 2016
3	10	January 2, 2017	March 6, 2017
4	10	January 1, 2018	March 5, 2018
5	7	August 6, 2018	September 17, 2018
6	10	January 7, 2019	March 11, 2019
7	7	August 5, 2019	September 16, 2019
8	10	January 6, 2020	March 10, 2020
9	10	January 4, 2021	February 19, 2021
10	10	December 27, 2021	February 21, 2022
11	10	December 26, 2022	February 27, 2023
12	10	January 1, 2024	March 1, 2024
13	10	January 6, 2025	March 3, 2025
NG	TBA	January 5, 2026	TBA
S	13	October 5, 2016	TBA

== Season 1 ==
=== Contestants ===
Rank	Baker	Age	Location	Place
1	Hollis Johnson	12	Jacksonville, Florida	Winner
2	Annika Coffman	11	Boise, Idaho	Runner-Up
3	Natalie Venable	11	Westlake Village, California	Finalists
3	Jackson Fujimori	11	Torrance, California	Finalists
5	Cody Vasquez	12	Gilbert, Arizona	5th Place
6	Payton Pelaez	10	San Francisco, California	6th Place
7	Caroline Binkley	12	Delaware, Ohio	7th Place
7	Anthony Smith	11	Rochester, New York	7th Place

=== Elimination table ===
Place	Contestant	Episode			
Place	Contestant	1	2	3	4
1	Hollis	IN	IN	HIGH	WINNER
2	Annika	HIGH	LOW	WIN	RUNNER-UP
3	Jackson	HIGH	HIGH	LOW	FINALISTS ^{1}
3	Natalie	IN	WIN	IN	FINALISTS ^{1}
5	Cody	WIN	IN	ELIM	
6	Payton	LOW	ELIM		
7	Caroline	ELIM			
7	Anthony	ELIM			

(WINNER) This baker won the competition.
(RUNNER-UP) This baker made it to the finale, and was in second place.
(FINALIST) This baker was eliminated in the finals.
(WIN) This baker won the baking challenge.
(HIGH) Baker was one of the judges' favourite bakers that week, but didn't win.
(IN) Baker got through to the next round.
(LOW) Baker was one of the judges' least favourite bakers that week, but was not eliminated.
(ELIM) This baker was eliminated from the championship.

^1: Jackson and Natalie were eliminated before the winner was announced.

=== Episodes ===
No. in Episode	Title	Original air date
1	"Bake Sale"	February 2, 2015
The first challenge is to make 2 baked goods fit for a bake sale, in two hours. In the middle of the baking, Duff Goldman and Valerie Bertinelli give the bakers a twist: to incorporate peanut butter and jelly. Winner: Cody Winner's Dishes: Lemon Pound Cake and a Razzleberry Pie (Raspberries, Blackberries and Blueberries) Recipe Incorporated: Raspberry Vanilla Pudding Pie with Peanut Butter Crust Lost: Anthony and Caroline Loser's Dishes: Anthony – Blueberry Lattice Pie, Chocolate Mousse Tart and a Peanut Butter Jelly cookie; Caroline – Upside-Down Peach Tart with Oatmeal Lace Cookies and Peanut Butter and Jelly Cupcakes
2	"Dessert Imposters"	February 9, 2015
The six bakers are tasked to make a dessert impostor that looks savory but is actually sweet. The six choices were bagel (Hollis), sushi (Annika), pizza (Payton), taco (Cody), burger (Natalie), and spaghetti (Jackson). Duff and Valerie throw in the challenge of making the bakers incorporate a side kick to the original plan. Winner: Natalie Winner's Dish: Vanilla Cupcake Bun, Brownie Meat Patty, Coconut Lettuce, Licorice Tomatoes, and white chocolate Thousand Island Dressing with a sidekick of parmesan cheese fries (apples fried and baked with powdered sugar) Lost: Payton Loser's Dish: Snickerdoodle Cookie Crust with Marshmallow Cheese, Peanut Butter Cups as olives, Gummies as peppers and fondant as pepperoni with a sidekick of garlic bread (pie dough rolled with cinnamon and sugar and baked with icing)
3	"Stuffed Puffs"	February 16, 2015
The five bakers are challenged to make 24 stuffed puffs made from pâte à choux dough in 90 minutes. Duff and Valerie throw a monkey wrench in everybody's plans by changing the plan from making all sweet to half savory. Winner: Annika Winner's Dish: A lemon cream puff with a savory cheddar cheese cream puff Lost: Cody Loser's Dish: A chocolate ricotta cream puff with an eclair filled with figs, blue cheese and prosciutto
4	"Celebration Cakes"	February 23, 2015
The four bakers are challenged to make a celebration cake for the finale. The cake must be at least three layers. Valerie and Duff throw another twist and tell the kids they need to make a "party favor" and give the kids ideas. Annika makes a dark chocolate cake with a raspberry cream coat and frosting. Jackson makes a lemon cake. Hollis makes a lemon cake. Natalie creates a lemon cake with cream cheese frosting. Jackson attempts to make macarons, but they crack. He then makes shortbread. Annika makes lemon bars. Hollis makes a sugar cookie. Natalie makes a cake-in-a-jar. The judges have two standouts; Annika and Hollis. Hollis wins the $10,000, her cake in Duff's collection and the industrial kitchen set. Winner: Hollis Runner-Up: Annika Finalists: Jackson and Natalie

== Season 2 ==
10 bakers compete for the title of Kids Baking Champion and $25,000. Duff Goldman and Valerie Bertinelli are the hosts and judges again.

=== Contestants ===
Rank	Baker	Age	Location	Place
1	Rebecca Beale	13	Graham, Texas	Winner
2	Yahshimabet Sellassie-Hall	12	Oakland, California	Runners-Up
2	Matthew Merrill	11	Great Falls, Virginia	Runners-Up
4	Peggy Fischer	10	St. Johnsbury, Vermont	4th Place
5	Jane Haviland	10	Ann Arbor, Michigan	5th Place
6	Alex Portis	12	Monroeville, Pennsylvania	6th Place
7	Emma Wensing	11	Austin, Texas	7th Place
8	Colby Lacasse	10	Blue Hill, Maine	8th Place
9	Ryan Wilson	11	Danville, California	9th Place
10	Alex Alcorta	10	Austin, Texas	10th Place

=== Elimination table ===
Place	Contestant	Episode							
Place	Contestant	1	2	3	4	5	6	7	8
1	Rebecca	IN	WIN	IN	IN	IN	IN	WIN	WINNER
2	Yahshimabet	HIGH	IN	HIGH	HIGH	IN	LOW	LOW	RUNNERS-UP
2	Matthew	IN	IN	LOW	WIN	HIGH	WIN	LOW	RUNNERS-UP
4	Peggy	IN	LOW	WIN	LOW	WIN	IN	ELIM	
5	Jane	WIN	IN	LOW	HIGH	LOW	ELIM		
6	Alex P.	HIGH	IN	IN	IN	ELIM			
7	Emma	IN	HIGH	IN	ELIM				
8	Colby	LOW	LOW	ELIM					
9	Ryan	LOW	ELIM						
10	Alex A.	ELIM							

(WINNER) This baker won the competition.
(RUNNER-UP) This baker made it to the finale, and was in second place.
(WIN) This baker won the baking challenge.
(HIGH) Baker was one of the judges' favourite bakers that week, but didn't win.
(IN) Baker got through to the next round.
(LOW) Baker was one of the judges' least favourite bakers that week, but was not eliminated.
(ELIM) This baker was eliminated from the championship.

=== Episodes ===
No. in Episode	Title	Original air date
1 (5)	"Pie à la Mode"	January 4, 2016
For the first challenge, the bakers are asked to make a perfect pie. The twist was that they had to make ice cream. Winner: Jane Winner's Dish: Jane's Grandma Jean's pecan pie with a side of chocolate shaved ice cream. Lost: Alex A. Loser's Dish: A chocolate cream pie with a cinnamon ice cream.
2 (6)	"Eclairs Gone Wild"	January 11, 2016
The bakers are given the task of making 12 eclairs that have "gone wild" with color and flavor. A twist arrives with the bakers making 4 cream puffs in the shape of their favorite animal. Winner: Rebecca Winner's Dish: A caramel bacon eclair with a mouse cream puff filled with a lime and a raspberry pastry cream. Lost: Ryan Loser's Dish: A cookie butter eclair with a snail cream puff intended to be filled with the same eclair pastry cream, but actually empty.
3 (7)	"'Hot' Chocolate"	January 18, 2016
The bakers are given the challenge of creating any chocolate intensive dessert, but a twist shows up requiring that they use chilies, hot spices and hot sauce in their dessert. Winner: Peggy Winner's Dish: A chocolate cayenne brownie with a raspberry coulis and a sriracha ice cream. Lost: Colby Loser's Dish: A chocolate cayenne cake with a vanilla buttercream frosting with a chocolate cayenne ganache.
4 (8)	"Macaron Stackaron"	January 25, 2016
The remaining kids are given the challenge of creating macarons of any flavor. The twist is that they must stack them to 5 inches tall. If they do not stack them to the required height, they are not eligible to win, but it does not mean they are out of the competition. Winner: Matthew Winner's Dish: A chocolate cherry macaron and a S'mores macaron. Lost: Emma Loser's Dish: A chocolate macaron filled with a cream cheese frosting and raspberry coulis.
5 (9)	"Lunch Box Desserts"	February 1, 2016
The bakers are given the task of creating desserts using items in a lunch box. The twist is that they must use another item given out: banana chips or carrots. Winner: Peggy Winner's Dish: A chocolate zucchini cake with an orange sauce and a coconut carrot ice cream. Lost: Alex P. Loser's Dish: An open-faced ice cream sandwich featuring an almond butter cookie with a pumpkin seed ice cream with sauteed strawberries and carrots.
6 (10)	"Candymonium"	February 8, 2016
The excited bakers are challenged to create desserts using 3 types of candy. The twist is that they must use a blow torch somewhere on their dessert in a way that makes sense. Winner: Matthew Winner's Dish: a peanut butter chocolate sachertorte with a torched meringue. Lost: Jane Loser's Dish: A sour candy cake with a sugar stick frosting with chocolate candies and torched marshmallows.
7 (11)	"Dessert Imposters 2.0"	February 15, 2016
The bakers are challenged to make dessert imposters, the favorite challenge from last season. The twist is that they must create a savory cupcake along with their sweet imposter. Winner: Rebecca Winner's Dish: A BLT with yellow cake bread, white chocolate lettuce, strawberries as tomatoes, marzipan bacon and buttercream mayonnaise with a corn cupcake with mashed potato frosting. Lost: Peggy Loser's Dish: Nachoes with phyllo dough chips, lemon curd cheese, white cake as chicken, and lime zest as cilantro with a butternut squash cupcake with a guacamole frosting.
8 (12)	"Spring Break Cakes"	February 22, 2016
For the final challenge, the bakers are given the task of creating cakes based on common "Spring Break" destinations: the beach (Rebecca), the amusement park (Matthew) and camping (Yahshimabet). The twist is that they must include a curd filling in their cake. Winner: Rebecca Winner's Dish: A lemon chiffon cake with a strawberry buttercream with lemon and strawberry curd, decorated to look like the beach. Runners-Up: Matthew and Yahshimabet Matthew's Cake: A chocolate cake with an orange buttercream filled with an orange curd and decorated to look like a roller coaster car found at an amusement park. Yahshimabet's Cake: A mocha cake and a chai spice cake with buttercream and filled with orange curd white chocolate ganache, decorated to look like a camping trip.

== Season 3 ==
=== Contestants ===
Source for first names, hometowns, and age:

Rank	Baker	Age	Location	Place
1	Aidan Berry	12	Shalimar, Florida	Winner
2	Justice Faustina	12	Napa, California	Runners-Up
2	Kaniyah Cary	10	Portsmouth, Virginia	Runners-Up
4	Cole Frederickson	12	Thousand Oaks, California	4th Place
5	Audra Tow	11	Aurora, Colorado	5th Place
6	Jason Intravartolo	11	Seattle, Washington	6th Place
7	Reese Smith	10	Bloomfield Hills, Michigan	7th Place
8	Maya Jindal	9	Great Falls, Virginia	8th Place
9	Keili Gorczyca	10	San Francisco, California	9th Place
10	Dylin Musgrove	12	Augusta, Georgia	10th Place
11	Charlotte d'Arabian	10	Coronado, California	11th Place
12	Brooke Cumberland	9	Old Greenwich, Connecticut	12th Place

=== Elimination table ===
Place	Contestant	Episode									
Place	Contestant	1	2	3	4	5	6	7	8	9	10
1	Aidan	IN	WIN	HIGH	HIGH	LOW	WIN	IN	LOW	WIN	WINNER
2	Justice	HIGH	IN	IN	IN	WIN	WIN	WIN	HIGH	IN	RUNNERS-UP
2	Kaniyah	WIN	HIGH	IN	LOW	HIGH	IN	IN	WIN	LOW	RUNNERS-UP
4	Cole	IN	HIGH	HIGH	WIN	IN	WIN	HIGH	IN	ELIM	
5	Audra	IN	IN	LOW	IN	IN	WIN	LOW	ELIM		
6	Jason	LOW	LOW	WIN	IN	IN	LOW	ELIM			
7	Reese	HIGH	IN	IN	LOW	LOW	ELIM				
8	Maya	IN	IN	LOW	IN	ELIM					
9	Keili	IN	IN	IN	ELIM						
10	Dylin	IN	LOW	ELIM							
11	Charlotte	LOW	ELIM								
12	Brooke	ELIM									

(WINNER) This baker won the competition.
(RUNNER-UP) This baker made it to the finale, and was in second place.
(WIN) This baker won the baking challenge.
(WIN) This baker was on the winning team of a team challenge.
(HIGH) Baker was one of the judges' favourite bakers that week, but didn't win.
(IN) Baker got through to the next round.
(LOW) Baker was one of the judges' least favourite bakers that week, but was not eliminated.
(ELIM) This baker was eliminated from the championship.

=== Episodes ===
No. in Episode	Title	Original air date
1	"Life Is a Carnival"	January 2, 2017
In this episode, the bakers are challenged to make carnival themed cupcakes. Duff and Valerie throw a twist in which the kids have to incorporate kettle corn and other small carnival treats. Winner: Kaniyah Winner's Dish: A vanilla popcorn cupcake with a vanilla buttercream frosting. Lost: Brooke Loser's Dish: A lemon cupcake with a sweet pretzel filling and a vanilla frosting.
2	"I Lava Volcano"	January 9, 2017
The kid bakers have to make tropical volcano cakes for the challenge. A twist is tossed-in, in which they have to make edible boulders. Winner: Aidan Winner's Dish: A passionfruit cake with a banana buttercream with cream-filled cookie boulders. Lost: Charlotte Loser's Dish: A ginger cake with a chocolate ganache frosting with chocolate and fondant boulders.
3	"Comfort Food Dessert Imposters"	January 16, 2017
The remaining bakers must create a comfort food dessert imposter — meatloaf (Cole), fried chicken (Justice), mac and cheese (Audra), PB&J (Keili), chili (Reese), roast beef sandwich (Maya), hot dog (Dylin), meatball sub (Aidan), grilled cheese sandwich (Kaniyah), and a burrito (Jason). The bakers are then asked to make a side of chips and salsa. Winner: Jason Winner's Dish: A crepe tortilla filled with pound cake as chicken and chocolate as refried beans with a side of chocolate and buttercream salsa with crepe chips Lost: Dylin Loser's Dish: A vanilla hot dog bun with a vanilla buttercream hot dog, mustard, ketchup and relish, with a side of cherry salsa with phyllo dough chips.
4	"Color Me Wow!"	January 23, 2017
The bakers are given the challenge of creating a tie dye cake to resemble the 60's. A twist is that they must make a swirled ice cream. Winner: Cole Winner's Dish:A fruit flavored cake dyed multiple colors with a fruit swirl ice cream. Lost: Keili Loser's Dish: An apple cinnamon cake with lemon and raspberry with a swirl ice cream.
5	"Throwback Eclairs"	January 30, 2017
The kids are challenged to make eclairs based on old desserts: Coconut Cream Pie (Cole), Black Forest Cake (Justice) German Chocolate Cake (Maya), Chocolate Pecan Pie (Audra), Pineapple Upside Down Cake (Reese), Cherry Cheesecake (Kaniyah), Banana Cream Pie (Aidan) and Grandmas Apple Pie (Jason). A twist comes in when the kids must make something with dried fruit. Winner: Justice Winner's Dish: An eclair filled with chocolate cherry whipped cream topped with a chocolate apricot ganache. Lost: Maya Loser's Dish: An eclair filled with chocolate pastry cream and topped with dates.
6	"Breakfast Desserts"	February 6, 2017
Valerie, the queen of pancakes, and Duff, the king of waffles challenge the bakers to make cakes out of one of the two breakfast items. Team are decided with a coin draw, and the winning side does not face elimination. A twist is that they must use breakfast cereal in their dessert. Justice, Audra, Aidan and Cole were Team Waffle, and Kaniyah, Jason and Reese were Team Pancake. Winner: Aidan Winner's Dish: a cinnamon roll style waffle with swiss meringue buttercream topped with cinnamon crunch cereal and a side of cinnamon crunch cereal ice cream. Lost: Reese Loser's Dish: A carrot cake pancake with a vanilla buttercream topped with melted chocolate and a cherry.
7	"Mobile App Cookies"	February 13, 2017
The bakers are given the task of creating sugar cookies to resemble apps and must explain what the app does. For example: SnackChat, DessertCraft, Noodle Maps, etc. A twist is that the bakers must use citrus in their dessert. Winner: Justice Winner's Dish: An orange cookie with a glaze and artistic app designs. Lost: Jason Loser's Dish: An orange cookie with a vanilla glaze and designs. (Jason had no explanation for his apps)
8	"Pet Shop Joys"	February 20, 2017
The bakers are challenged to create desserts based on animals: a rabbit, a turtle, a silky chicken, a guinea pig and a mini pig. The twist is that the bakers must include a friend for their mini pet dessert. Winner: Kaniyah Winner's Dish: A pineapple upside down cake with a cat sugar cookie and a pineapple ice cream. (Kaniyah's animal was a rabbit). Lost: Audra Loser's Dish: A banana cake with a vanilla frosting and fondant chickens with a mini pet friend of a fondant egg the chicken laid. (Audra's animal was a silky chicken).
9	"Molecular Kidstronomy"	February 27, 2017
The bakers are given the difficult task to create desserts with molecular ingredients: the smoking gun, the maltodextrin, etc. The twist is that the bakers must use old-fashioned whisks in some way. Winner: Aidan Winner's Dish: A S'mores tart with a graham cracker crust, a smoked chocolate ganache, peanut butter snow and whipped cream. Lost: Cole Loser's Dish: A smoked apple pie with an apple ice cream and peanut butter snow with whipped cream.
10	"Superhero Grand Finale"	March 6, 2017
The bakers are given the final task of creating cakes resembling a made up super hero. The twist is they must create a super villain too. Winner: Aidan Winner's Dish: a lemon rosemary olive oil cake with a swiss meringue buttercream with a cookie super villains. His hero is named Prism, and he created color. His super villain is Dismal, and he makes everything gray and dull. Runners-Up: Justice and Kaniyah Justice's Dish: A rose water cake with a vanilla butter cream and a rice cereal treat villain. His hero was Weather Man, and he controls the weather. His super villain is The Evil Sun, and he wants it to be hot all year long. Kaniyah's Dish: A lemon rosemary blueberry cake with a vanilla buttercream and a cookie villain. Her hero is Catastrophe Girl, who prevents the catastrophes from happening. Her super villain is Mr. Rotten Potato, who stayed in a refrigerator too long and turned evil.

== Season 4 ==
=== Contestants ===
Source for names, age, and hometowns:

Rank	Baker	Age	Location	Place
1	Linsey Lam	13	Closter, New Jersey	Winner
2	Abby Martin	13	Franklin, Wisconsin	Runners-Up
2	Alex Czajka	12	Edmonton, Alberta	Runners-Up
4	Bryn Montgomery	11	South Hill, Virginia	4th Place
5	Julia Betz	12	Key Biscayne, Florida	5th Place
6	Luke Jonsson	13	Rancho Santa Margarita, California	6th Place
7	Aditya Pillutla	12	Cary, North Carolina	7th Place
8	Soleil Thomas	12	Livingston, New Jersey	8th Place
9	Beverly Hepler	10	Foster City, California	9th Place
10	Grady Holloway	11	Chesterfield, Missouri	10th Place
11	Gareth Bennett	10	Gaithersburg, Maryland	11th Place
12	Michael Platt	11	Bowie, Maryland	12th Place

=== Elimination table ===
Place	Contestant	Episode									
Place	Contestant	1	2	3	4	5	6	7	8	9	10
1	Linsey	IN	IN	HIGH	IN	IN	WIN	HIGH	WIN	LOW	WINNER
2	Abby	IN	WIN	IN	WIN	WIN	IN	WIN	LOW	LOW	RUNNERS-UP
2	Alex	LOW	HIGH	HIGH	LOW	IN	LOW	LOW	HIGH	WIN	RUNNERS-UP
4	Bryn	IN	IN	LOW	IN	WIN	HIGH	IN	IN	ELIM	
5	Julia	HIGH	IN	IN	IN	WIN	IN	IN	ELIM		
6	Luke	IN	HIGH	IN	IN	LOW	IN	ELIM			
7	Aditya	WIN	LOW	WIN	IN	IN	ELIM				
8	Soleil	IN	LOW	IN	LOW	ELIM					
9	Beverly	HIGH	IN	LOW	ELIM						
10	Grady	IN	IN	ELIM							
11	Gareth	LOW	ELIM								
12	Michael	ELIM									

(WINNER) This baker won the competition.
(RUNNER-UP) This baker made it to the finale, and was in second place.
(WIN) This baker won the baking challenge.
(WIN) This baker was on the winning team of a team challenge.
(HIGH) Baker was one of the judges' favourite bakers that week, but didn't win.
(IN) Baker got through to the next round.
(LOW) Baker was one of the judges' least favourite bakers that week, but was not eliminated.
(ELIM) This baker was eliminated from the championship.

=== Episodes ===
No. in Episode	Title	Original air date
1	"Cookielicious"	January 1, 2018
The bakers have to make a cookie cake in an assigned flavor. The flavors are: snickerdoodle (Beverly and Bryn), chocolate (Linsey and Abby), chocolate chip (Luke and Julia), oatmeal raisin (Aditya and Soleil), sugar (Alex and Gareth), and peanut butter (Michael and Grady). The twist was they had to edibly and legibly write their name on their cake. Winner: Aditya Winner's Dish: Spiced oatmeal raisin cookie cake with spiced buttercream. Lost: Michael Loser's Dish: Peanut butter chip cookie cake with peanut butter buttercream.
2	"Pizza For Dessert"	January 8, 2018
The bakers had to turn pizza into dessert pizza. The twist was they had to incorporate an original pizza ingredient (tomatoes, ricotta cheese, hot peppers, bacon, or basil). Winner: Abby Winner's Dish: Blondie crust pizza with maple cream cheese and bacon. Lost: Gareth Loser's Dish: Pie crust pizza with raspberry ricotta buttercream.
3	"Lemon BFFs"	January 15, 2018
In honor of Valerie Bertinelli's favorite food, lemons, the bakers had to make lemon bars with another assigned ingredient. They were: pecan (Linsey), raspberry (Grady), blueberry (Aditya), blackberry (Luke), cherry (Julia), walnut (Beverly), strawberry (Abby), ginger (Alex), coconut (Soleil), and almond (Bryn). The twist was they had to make an edible lemon decoration. Winner: Aditya Winner's Dish: Blueberry lemon bar. Lost: Grady Loser's Dish: Raspberry lemon bar.
4	"Cake and Ice Cream 2.0"	January 22, 2018
The bakers had to make ice cream cone drip cakes inspired by a popular ice cream flavor. They were: pistachio (Abby), Neapolitan (Bryn), chocolate peanut butter (Aditya), cookies 'n cream (Soleil), mint chocolate chip (Linsey), butter pecan (Luke), chocolate chip (Beverly), vanilla raspberry swirl (Julia), and rainbow sherbet (Alex). The twist was they had to make ice cream on the side. Winner: Abby Winner's Dish: Pistachio cake with pistachio buttercream. Lost: Beverly Loser's Dish: Chocolate chip cake with chocolate chip buttercream.
5	"Doughnuts Go Nuts!"	January 29, 2018
The bakers worked in teams. They had to make an artful design with doughnuts. The twist was they had to incorporate a textural element in their doughnuts. They were: Aditya and Alex, Linsey and Luke, Abby and Julia, and Bryn and Soleil. The winning team earned immunity from elimination. The twist was the bakers had to add texture to their doughnut (corn flakes, fruit cereal, graham crackers, pretzels, chocolate sandwich cookies, peanuts, potato chips, macadamia nuts) Top Team: Abby and Julia Winner: Bryn Winner's Dish: Bacon doughnut with maple glaze. Lost: Soleil Loser's Dish: Lemon doughnut with blueberry glaze.
6	"Unicornucopia"	February 5, 2018
The bakers had to make a unicorn cake in an assigned emotion. They were: surprised (Julia), angry (Luke), happy (Linsey), loving (Alex), worried (Abby), sad (Aditya), and shy (Bryn). The twist was they had to make a baked nameplate for their unicorn. Duff Goldman got a tattoo inspired by the winning cake. Winner: Linsey Winner's Dish: Confetti cake with raspberry purée and vanilla buttercream. Lost: Aditya Loser's Dish: Lavender cake with vanilla buttercream and blueberry purée.
7	"Lunchbox Impostors"	February 12, 2018
The bakers had to make dessert imposters inspired by classic lunchbox items. They were: bologna sandwich (Linsey), turkey wrap (Julia), tuna salad sandwich (Luke), PB&J (Abby), chicken nuggets (Bryn), and ham and cheese sandwich (Alex). The twist was they had to incorporate a juice box into their dessert imposter. Winner: Abby Winner's Dish: "PB&J" with "strawberry yogurt". Lost: Luke Loser's Dish: "Tuna salad sandwich" with apple juice granola.
8	"Out Of This World!"	February 19, 2018
The bakers had to make intergalactic desserts with an assigned freeze-dried fruit. They were: mango (Abby), peach (Alex), banana (Bryn), strawberry (Linsey), and apricot (Julia). The twist was they had to make an edible sun. Winner: Linsey Winner's Dish: Strawberry sugar cookies with royal icing and rice cereal sun. Lost: Julia Loser's Dish: Cream puffs with apricot pastry cream and cereal treat sun.
9	"Sand Castle Sweets"	February 26, 2018
The bakers had to make a rice cereal treat sandcastle and fill it with 12 baked goods. The twist was they had to incorporate pineapple in their desserts. Winner: Alex Winner's Dish: S'mores rice cereal treat castle and piña colada tarts. Lost: Bryn Loser's Dish: Pineapple rice cereal treat castle and orange pineapple sugar cookies.
10	"Cover Story Cakes"	March 5, 2018
The bakers had to make cakes for Food Network Magazine's tenth birthday. The twist was they had to make a topper with the number 10 in honor of the magazine turning 10. Winner: Linsey Winner's Cake: Chocolate cake with coconut cream and raspberry buttercream. Runner-Ups: Abby and Alex Abby's Cake: Vanilla bean cake with lime, strawberry, and vanilla buttercream. Alex's Cake: Pumpkin spice cake with spice pastry cream and orange cream cheese frosting.

== Season 5 ==
Nine bakers compete for the title of Kids Baking Champion, $25,000, and a spot in Food Network Magazine. Duff Goldman and Valerie Bertinelli are the hosts and judges again.

=== Contestants ===
Rank	Baker	Age	Location	Place
1	Natasha Jiwani	13	Bellevue, Washington	Winner
2	Taylor Inouye	12	Kailua, Hawaii	Runners-Up
2	Matthew Azuma	12	Glendora, California	Runners-Up
4	Issi Neufield	11	Dallas, Texas	4th Place
5	Saylor Herrin	11	Ailey, Georgia	5th Place
6	Davey Treen	10	Akron, Ohio	6th Place
7	Mekdes Bass	10	Boulder, Colorado	7th Place
8	Enzo Cosani	10	Orlando, Florida	8th Place
9	Zach Atlas	13	New York, New York	9th Place

=== Elimination table ===
Place	Contestant	Episode						
Place	Contestant	1	2	3	4	5	6	7
1	Natasha	IN	WIN	IN	HIGH	HIGH	WIN	WINNER
2	Taylor	WIN	HIGH	HIGH	IN	IN	HIGH	RUNNERS-UP
2	Matthew	IN	IN	IN	LOW	WIN	LOW	RUNNERS-UP
4	Issi	IN	LOW	IN	WIN	LOW	ELIM	
5	Saylor	HIGH	IN	WIN	IN	ELIM		
6	Davey	IN	IN	LOW	ELIM			
7	Mekdes	IN	IN	ELIM				
8	Enzo	LOW	ELIM					
9	Zach	ELIM						

(WINNER) This baker won the competition.
(RUNNER-UP) This baker made it to the finale, and was in second place.
(WIN) This baker won the baking challenge.
(HIGH) Baker was one of the judges' favourite bakers that week, but didn't win.
(IN) Baker got through to the next round.
(LOW) Baker was one of the judges' least favourite bakers that week, but was not eliminated.
(ELIM) This baker was eliminated from the championship.

=== Episodes ===
No. in Episode	Title	Original air date
1	"Selfieclairs"	August 6, 2018
The bakers had to make six selfie éclairs in an assigned flavor. They were: strawberry (Issi), raspberry (Matthew), chocolate hazelnut (Saylor), mango (Natasha), salted caramel (Zach), cookie butter (Taylor), apple (Mekdes), S'mores (Davey), and cinnamon (Enzo). The twist was they had to write an edible hashtag on one of their selfieclairs. The winner's éclair got posted on Duff Goldman's Twitter account. Winner: Taylor Winner's Dish: Tie-dye éclairs with cookie butter pastry cream. Lost: Zach Loser's Dish: Éclairs with salted caramel pastry cream.
2	"Defying Gravity"	August 13, 2018
They had to make a gravity-defying cake with candy as the gravity-defying element. They were: chocolate peanut butter candies (Taylor), jelly beans (Davey), chocolate candies (Saylor), candy butterflies (Mekdes), gummy bears (Issi), sour gummies (Matthew), candy flowers (Natasha), and fruit candy (Enzo). The twist was they had to incorporate fresh ginger in their cakes. Winner: Natasha Winner's Dish: Confetti cake with ginger pastry cream, American buttercream, and candy flowers. Lost: Enzo Loser's Dish: Chocolate cake with lemon filling, ginger buttercream, and fruit candy.
3	"Ice Screamers"	August 20, 2018
The bakers had to make an ice cream sandwich with an assigned baked good and ice cream that they made from scratch. They were: waffle (Taylor), brownie (Issi), French toast (Natasha), doughnut (Davey), cupcake (Saylor), blondie (Matthew), and cookie (Mekdes). The twist was they had to make a sauce to go along with their ice cream sandwich. Winner: Saylor Winner's Dish: Confetti cupcakes with peach ice cream and strawberry, raspberry, blackberry coulis. Lost: Mekdes Loser's Dish: Dark chocolate peanut butter cookies with chocolate ice cream and cookies 'n cream sauce.
4	"Imposter Italiano"	August 27, 2018
The bakers had to make lasagna dessert imposters inspired by different lasagna types. They were: meat lasagna (Natasha and Issi), spinach and mushroom lasagna (Taylor and Saylor), and veggie pesto lasagna (Davey and Matthew). The twist was they had to make an imposter classic Italian side dish to go with their lasagna. They were: calamari (Natasha and Davey), garlic bread (Taylor and Saylor), and stuffed mushrooms (Issi and Matthew). Winner: Issi Winner's Dish: "Meat lasagna" (crêpes with ricotta, basil, and strawberry sauce and Parmesan) with "stuffed mushrooms" (chocolate rice cereal treats). Lost: Davey Loser's Dish: "Veggie pesto lasagna" (blondies with cream cheese frosting) with "calamari" (rice cereal treat doughnuts).
5	"You're In the Ballpark!"	September 3, 2018
Darci Lynne and Petunia guest starred on this episode. The bakers had to make baseball inspired desserts with popcorn. They were: cookie bar (Matthew), tart (Taylor), cheesecake (Saylor), Bundt cake (Natasha), and macaron (Issi). The twist was they had to make an edible baseball or something they could find at a baseball diamond. Winner: Matthew Winner's Dish: A: Shortbread cookie bar with dulce de leche chocolate ganache and popcorn. B: Popcorn marshmallow treat baseball. Lost: Saylor Loser's Dish: A: French toast bacon cheesecake with graham cracker and popcorn crust. B: Caramel popcorn rice cereal treat baseball.
6	"Bite-Sized Birthday Party"	September 10, 2018
The bakers had to make 24 bite-sized desserts for a bite-sized birthday party. The twist was they had to incorporate bananas in one of their desserts. Winner: Natasha Winner's Dish: A: Banana macarons. B: Rainbow sherbet cupcakes. Lost: Issi Loser's Dish: A: Mint chocolate cupcakes with peanut butter banana cream cheese frosting. B: Cowboy cookies.
7	"Winning Colors"	September 17, 2018
The bakers had to make a rainbow cake that looks like a rainbow on both the outside and the inside. The twist was they had to make an edible pot of gold. Winner: Natasha Winner's Cake: Vanilla cake with citrus frosting and rainbow rosettes. Runner-Ups: Matthew and Taylor Matthew's Cake: Lemon cake with raspberry filling and lemon vanilla buttercream. Taylor's Cake: Two-tier yellow cake with lemon curd and strawberry buttercream.

== Season 6 ==
12 bakers compete for the title of Kids Baking Champion, $25,000, and a spot in Food Network Magazine. Duff Goldman and Valerie Bertinelli are the hosts and judges again.

=== Contestants ===
Rank	Baker	Age	Location	Place
1	Paige Goehner	11	Blaine, Minnesota	Winner
2	Davis Sams	13	Vancouver, Canada	Runners-Up
2	Meadow Roberts	10	Minneapolis, Minnesota	Runners-Up
4	Jaxon Remillard	11	Mansfield, Texas	4th Place
5	Nyah Rosado	11	New Rochelle, New York	5th Place
6	Madison Totaro	10	Austin, Texas	6th Place
7	Karthik Vemparala	11	Somerset, New Jersey	7th Place
8	Jenna Alnatur	9	Clifton, New Jersey	8th Place
9	Misha Jones	12	Annapolis, Maryland	9th Place
10	Gavin Crawford	11	Houston, Texas	10th Place
11	Brooklyn Kyzar	12	Silverhill, Alabama	11th Place
12	Kasey Moeggenborg	13	Rockford, Michigan	12th Place

=== Elimination table ===
Place	Contestant	Episode									
Place	Contestant	1	2	3	4	5	6	7	8	9	10
1	Paige	IN	HIGH	WIN	LOW	WIN	IN	LOW	HIGH	LOW	WINNER
2	Davis	IN	IN	IN	HIGH	IN	WIN	IN	WIN	WIN	RUNNERS-UP
2	Meadow	WIN	IN	IN	IN	LOW	IN	WIN	IN	HIGH	RUNNERS-UP
4	Jaxon	LOW	IN	IN	WIN	HIGH	IN	IN	LOW	ELIM	
5	Nyah	IN	IN	WIN	IN	WIN	HIGH	LOW	ELIM		
6	Madison	IN	WIN	WIN	IN	WIN	LOW	ELIM			
7	Karthik	HIGH	IN	WIN	IN	IN	ELIM				
8	Jenna	IN	LOW	LOW	LOW	ELIM					
9	Misha	HIGH	LOW	WIN	ELIM						
10	Gavin	IN	IN	ELIM							
11	Brooklyn	LOW	ELIM								
12	Kasey	ELIM									

(WINNER) This baker won the competition.
(RUNNER-UP) This baker made it to the finale, and was in second place.
(WIN) This baker won the baking challenge.
(WIN) This baker was on the winning team of a team challenge.
(HIGH) Baker was one of the judges' favourite bakers that week, but didn't win.
(IN) Baker got through to the next round.
(LOW) Baker was one of the judges' least favourite bakers that week, but was not eliminated.
(ELIM) This baker was eliminated from the championship.

=== Episodes ===
No. in Episode	Title	Original air date
1	"Bakin' With Bacon"	January 7, 2019
In honor of Duff Goldman's favorite food, bacon, the bakers had to make bacon cupcakes with another assigned ingredient. They were: chocolate (Nyah), ginger (Davis), marshmallow (Madison), coffee (Jenna), cherry (Karthik), pecan (Brooklyn), cinnamon (Paige), peanut (Meadow), peach (Jaxon), maple (Misha), caramel (Gavin), and cream cheese (Kasey). The twist was they had to incorporate Valerie Bertinelli's second-favorite food, marzipan. Winner: Meadow Winner's Dish: Vanilla cupcakes with peanut butter bacon frosting. Lost: Kasey Loser's Dish: Vanilla cupcakes with cream cheese frosting and bacon.
2	"Spots and Stripes Forever"	January 14, 2019
The bakers had to make animal print mini cheesecakes in white and another assigned color. They also had an assigned animal. They were: white and turquoise cheetah (Nyah), white and magenta zebra (Jenna), white and pink leopard (Gavin), white and orange zebra (Davis), white and red cheetah (Brooklyn), white and lime green giraffe (Madison), white and blue leopard (Jaxon), white and yellow zebra (Karthik), white and brown tiger (Misha), white and dark green tiger (Meadow), and white and purple giraffe (Paige). The twist they had to incorporate honey in their cheesecakes. Winner: Madison Winner's Dish: White and lime green honey cheesecake with graham cracker crust. Lost: Brooklyn Loser's Dish: White and red honey cheesecake with graham cracker crust.
3	"Brownies vs. Blondies"	January 19, 2019
Duff Goldman prefers brownies, and Valerie Bertinelli prefers blondies, so they divided the bakers into two groups. The bakers had to make a brownie or blondie cake with an assigned ingredient. They were: walnuts (Davis and Karthik), peanut butter chips (Meadow and Misha), white chocolate chips (Jaxon and Madison), almonds (Gavin and Paige), and pumpkin (Jenna and Nyah). The twist was they had to incorporate sprinkles and get the sprinkles to stick. The winning team earned immunity from elimination. Team Brownie: Davis, Meadow, Jaxon, Gavin, and Jenna Team Blondie: Madison, Nyah, Karthik, Paige, and Misha Top Team: Team Blondie Winner: Misha Winner's Dish: Peanut butter chip blondie with caramel sauce and orange sprinkles. Lost: Gavin Loser's Dish: Almond brownie with almond buttercream and blue sprinkles.
4	"Macaron Madness"	January 28, 2019
The bakers had to make six macarons with happy faces and six macarons with sad faces. The twist was they had to make a crumble to go around their macarons. Winner: Jaxon Winner's Dish: Happy: Vanilla macaron with cream cheese buttercream. Sad: Vanilla macaron with espresso buttercream. Twist: Graham cracker crust crumble. Lost: Misha Loser's Dish: Happy: Macaron with Swiss buttercream and lemon curd. Sad: Macaron with Swiss buttercream and caramel. Twist: Vanilla wafer cookie crumble.
5	"Opposites Attract"	February 4, 2019
The bakers worked in teams. They had to make a 2-sided opposite cake in an assigned theme. They were: fire (Paige) and ice (Nyah), day (Meadow) and night (Karthik), land (Madison) and sea (Jaxon), and big (Davis) and small (Jenna). The twist was they had to incorporate a classic combination in their cake. They were: lemon (Nyah) and lime (Paige), chocolate (Jaxon) and peanut butter (Madison), white chocolate (Jenna) and macadamia nuts (Davis), and apples (Meadow) and cinnamon (Karthik). The winning team earned immunity from elimination. Top Team: Paige and Nyah Winner: Madison Winner's Dish: Chocolate cake with peanut butter cream cheese frosting. Lost: Jenna Loser's Dish: Raspberry lemon cake with white chocolate royal icing.
6	"Freaky Flavors"	February 11, 2019
The bakers had to make a tart with an assigned freaky flavor. They were: yuzu (Paige), jalapeño (Nyah), blue cheese (Karthik), goat cheese (Davis), anise (Meadow), curry (Jaxon), and pink peppercorn (Madison). The twist was they had to incorporate milk chocolate. Winner: Davis Winner's Dish: Sablé tart with milk chocolate goat cheese pastry cream and caramelized pears. Lost: Karthik Loser's Dish: Walnut crust tart with pear pastry cream, caramelized pears, and blue cheese crumbles.
7	"Monkey See, Monkey Bake"	February 18, 2019
The bakers had to make monkey bread volcanoes with an assigned tropical fruit. They were: mango (Madison), pineapple (Jaxon), orange (Paige), coconut (Meadow), banana (Davis), and passion fruit (Nyah). The twist was they had to make a lava sauce to dip their monkey bread in. Winner: Meadow Winner's Dish: Coconut monkey bread with coconut cream lava sauce. Lost: Madison Loser's Dish: Mango monkey bread with chocolate lava rocks and mango sauce.
8	"Let's Taco About Baking"	February 25, 2019
The bakers are asked to make dessert imposter tacos. Each of the bakers were assigned a different type of taco: chicken (Davis), ground beef (Jaxon), shrimp (Paige), pork (Nyah), and fried fish (Meadow). The twist was that they had to make a churro from scratch to go on the side. Winner: Davis Winner's Dish: Imposter taco with fried crepe as the taco shell, blondie as chicken, white chocolate as lettuce, and melted marshmallows as cheese, with a raspberry mango salsa, honey creme sour cream, and chocolate orange churro. Lost: Nyah Loser's Dish: Imposter taco with pie dough as the taco shell, cake as pork, chocolate as lettuce, and red airbrushed marshmallows as tomatoes with a churro.
9	"Puzzle Me This"	March 4, 2019
The bakers have to make sugar cookie puzzles with a nice design and an assigned flavor: spice (Meadow), raspberry (Jaxon), lemon (Davis), and butterscotch (Paige). The twist was that they had to additionally make a cookie in the shape of a key. Winner: Davis Winner's Dish: Lemon sugar cookie with lemon royal icing with lemon sugar cookie key. Davis designed his cookie like the Mona Lisa. Lost: Jaxon Loser's Dish: Raspberry sugar cookie with raspberry buttercream with raspberry sugar cookie key. Jaxon designed his cookie like a flower garden.
10	"Desserts Doing Good"	March 11, 2019
For the final challenge, the bakers are given the task of creating cakes based on school clubs with an assigned bake sale treat. Paige got Chess Club and chocolate covered pretzels. Davis got Dance Club and toffee. Meadow got Drama Club and rice cereal treats. The twist was that they had to use fresh cherries somewhere in their cake. Winner: Paige Winner's Dish: A chocolate cake with cherry pie, mascarpone, and crushed chocolate covered pretzel filling. Runners-Up: Davis and Meadow Davis's Cake: An Earl Gray cake with cherry buttercream filling topped with a toffee cookie crumble. Meadow's Cake: A lemon ginger cake with cherry buttercream filling.

== Season 7 ==
Aired August 5, 2019 - September 16, 2019. Nine bakers compete for the title of Kids Baking Champion, $25,000, and a spot in Food Network Magazine. Duff Goldman and Valerie Bertinelli are the hosts and judges again.

=== Contestants ===
Rank	Baker	Age	Location	Place
1	Trevin Alford	11	Washington, Indiana	Winner
2	Sophie Tate	12	Stansbury Park, Utah	Runners-Up
2	Tarek Husseini	13	St. Louis, Missouri	Runners-Up
4	Taylor Pusha	12	Roanoke, Virginia	4th Place
5	Brooke Waters	11	Selma, Alabama	5th Place
6	Brady Stewart	11	San Angelo, Texas	6th Place
7	Tori Church	12	Nashville, Tennessee	7th Place
8	Dharma Sabapathy	11	Austin, Texas	8th Place
9	Sophia Elrod	10	Nashville, Tennessee	9th Place

=== Elimination table ===
Place	Contestants	Episode						
Place	Contestants	1	2	3	4	5	6	7
1	Trevin	WIN	WIN	WIN	LOW	LOW	HIGH	WINNER
2	Sophie	IN	IN	LOW	WIN	HIGH	WIN	RUNNERS-UP
2	Tarek	IN	WIN	IN	IN	IN	LOW	RUNNERS-UP
4	Taylor	LOW	IN	HIGH	IN	WIN	ELIM	
5	Brooke	IN	LOW	IN	HIGH	ELIM		
6	Brady	HIGH	HIGH	IN	ELIM			
7	Tori	IN	WIN	ELIM				
8	Dharma	IN	ELIM					
9	Sophia	ELIM						

(WINNER) This baker won the competition.
(RUNNER-UP) This baker made it to the finale, and was in second place.
(WIN) This baker won the baking challenge.
(WIN) This baker was on the winning team of a team challenge.
(HIGH) Baker was one of the judges' favourite bakers that week, but didn't win.
(IN) Baker got through to the next round.
(LOW) Baker was one of the judges' least favourite bakers that week, but was not eliminated.
(ELIM) This baker was eliminated from the championship.

=== Episodes ===
No. in Episode	Title	Original air date
1	"Splatter Up!"	August 5, 2019
The bakers had to make splatter cakes with assigned flavors. The twist was to make a personalized cake topper. The winner of the challenge receives a signed apron from Duff and Valerie. Winner: Trevin Winner's Dish: Red Velvet Cake with white chocolate chips and cream cheese buttercream (also used for paint splatters) Lost: Sophia Loser's Dish: Chocolate Chip cake with Vanilla buttercream with royal icing splatters
2	"Desserts to the Rescue!"	August 12, 2019
The kid bakers were divided into four teams of two to make bird or pig cupcakes in honor of The Angry Birds Movie 2. At the start, there were two teams baking bird cupcakes (Red or Chuck) and pig cupcakes (Leonard and Garry) The twist was the teams had to switch partners (each team would have one bird and one pig cupcake) and create an edible Bird Island display. Top Team: Tarek and Trevin Winner: Tori Winner's Dish: Cinnamon Cupcake with Cream cheese frosting (Red) Lost: Dhrama Loser's Dish: Vanilla Lime Cupcake with Lime buttercream (Chuck)
3	"I Doughnut Know What to Think!"	August 19, 2019
The bakers were tasked to make giant doughnut cakes. The twist was for the bakers to incorporate coffee somewhere in their cakes (they can use instant coffee, cold brew, or coffee extract). Winner: Trevin Winner's Dish: Coconut cake with coffee ganache, coconut buttercream, topped with macaroons Lost: Tori Loser's Dish: Cherry cake with cherry pie filling and coffee glaze
4	"International Intrigue"	August 26, 2019
For this season's Dessert Imposters challenge, the bakers were asked to make dessert imposters that looked like certain international dishes. The twist was to make an edible credit card. Winner: Sophie Winner's Dish: Shish Kabob (honey cake pop, candied citrus peel, mango and white chocolate truffles) and butter cookie credit card Lost: Brady Loser's Dish: Fajitas (chocolate brownie with crepes, modeling chocolate, and buttercream) and shortbread cookie credit card
5	"Hole-y Hedgehogs"	September 2, 2019
The bakers were tasked to create poke cakes with a hedgehog theme. The twist was to make 3 edible bug decorations. Winner: Taylor Winner's Dish: Mocha cake with caramel filling, vanilla buttercream, chocolate cake pop hedgehog and bugs Lost: Brooke Loser's Dish: Carrot cake with spices pastry cream, vanilla buttercream, rice cereal treat hedgehog, and marzipan bugs
6	"Beauty is in the Pie of the Beholder"	September 9, 2019
The four bakers make pies with a late summer fruit (apples, blueberries, blackberries, and nectarines). The twist was to make ice cream from scratch. Winner: Sophie Winner's Dish: Blackberry pie with lemon ice cream Lost: Taylor Loser's Dish: Caramel apple pie with cinnamon ice cream
7	"Out of This World"	September 16, 2019
The last three bakers make cakes that look like a spaceship, aliens or another planet. The twist was to make a cookie that looks like Earth. Winner: Trevin Winner's Cake: Orange cake with pineapple curd and passion fruit buttercream (planet cake) and Macarons with orange buttercream (earth twist) Runner-Ups: Sophie and Tarek Sophie's Cake: Coconut cake with strawberry coulis, lime curd, and buttercream (alien cake) and coconut sugar cookie (earth twist) Tarek's Cake: Chocolate cake with mint chocolate chip buttercream (spaceship cake) and lemon sugar cookie (earth twist)

== Season 8 ==
=== Contestants ===
Rank	Baker	Age	Location	Place
1	Graysen Pinder	13	Wilmington, North Carolina	Winner
2	Reggie Strom	12	Bend, Oregon	Runners-Up
2	Sam Occhiogrosso	11	West Hartford, Connecticut	Runners-Up
4	Morgan Chaffin	11	Glen Burnie, Maryland	4th Place
5	Liam Bizjack	12	El Dorado Hills, California	5th Place
6	Naima Winston	11	Baltimore, Maryland	6th Place
7	Avner Schwartz	12	Haverford, Pennsylvania	7th Place
8	Anthony Fontanez	12	Belmar, New Jersey	8th Place
9	Saleem Sandhu	12	Yuba City, California	9th Place
10	Elise Sammis	11	Chapin, South Carolina	10th Place
11	Sahana Gade	11	Sugar Land, Texas	11th Place
12	Phoebe Gore	11	New York, New York	12th Place

=== Elimination table ===
Place	Contestant	Episode									
Place	Contestant	1	2	3	4	5	6	7	8	9	10
1	Graysen	IN	LOW	WIN	WIN	IN	IN	IN	LOW	HIGH	WINNER
2	Reggie	WIN	IN	IN	IN	IN	IN	WIN	WIN	LOW	RUNNERS-UP
2	Sam	HIGH	IN	IN	IN	IN	HIGH	IN	HIGH	WIN	RUNNERS-UP
4	Morgan	IN	IN	IN	IN	WIN	LOW	HIGH	IN	ELIM	
5	Liam	IN	IN	IN	IN	IN	IN	LOW	ELIM		
6	Naima	LOW	WIN	IN	IN	LOW	WIN	ELIM			
7	Avner	IN	IN	HIGH	LOW	HIGH	ELIM				
8	Anthony	IN	HIGH	IN	IN	ELIM					
9	Saleem	IN	IN	LOW	ELIM						
10	Elise	IN	IN	ELIM							
11	Sahana	IN	ELIM								
12	Phoebe	ELIM									

(WINNER) This baker won the competition.
(RUNNER-UP) This baker made it to the finale, and was in second place.
(WIN) This baker won the baking challenge.
(HIGH) Baker was one of the judges' favourite bakers that week, but didn't win.
(IN) Baker got through to the next round.
(LOW) Baker was one of the judges' least favourite bakers that week, but was not eliminated.
(ELIM) This baker was eliminated from the championship.

=== Episodes ===
No. in Episode	Title	Original air date
1	"Beyond the Fringe"	January 6, 2020
Inspired by the 1970s, Duff and Valerie tasked the kid bakers to create "Shag" cakes. The twist was to include canned fruit (peaches, cherries, pineapple, and mandarin oranges) into their cakes. Winner: Reggie Winner's Dish: Lime olive oil cake with mandarin orange filling and vanilla buttercream Lost: Phoebe Loser's Dish: Lemon cake with lemon curd and peach buttercream
2	"1,2,3 Delicious!"	January 13, 2020
Duff and Valerie have the bakers create desserts with the flavors of Neapolitan (chocolate, vanilla, and strawberry) in two hours. The desserts were: macarons (Elise and Anthony), napoleon (Avner and Liam), blondies (Reggie and Graysen), cookie sandwich (Sahana, Saleem, and Sam), and eclairs (Morgan and Naima). The twist was for the kid bakers to create strawberry fans to decorate their plates. Winner: Naima Winner's Dish: Vanilla eclair with strawberry pastry cream and chocolate ganache Lost: Sahana Loser's Dish: Sugar cookie sandwich with strawberry, chocolate, and vanilla buttercream filling
3	"Sammy Whammy"	January 20, 2020
For this season's Dessert Imposters challenge, the bakers were tasked to make dessert imposter sandwiches. The twist was to add a side to go with their sandwich (dill pickles, coleslaw, fruit cup, potato salad or cucumber salad). Winner: Graysen Winner's Dish: BLT on White bread (Cream cheese pound cake with homemade fondant, coating chocolate and candied strawberries) with Potato salad (pound cake with Swiss meringue buttercream) Lost: Elise Loser's Dish: Banh Mi on a Baguette (páte à Choux with blondies, raspberry puree, and shredded coconut) with Potato salad (swiss buttercream with blondies)
4	"Llama Drama"	January 27, 2020
The kid bakers take a llama as inspiration to create llama cupcakes in two hours. The assigned flavors are: cherry lime (Anthony), pumpkin cream cheese (Morgan), peanut butter chocolate (Sam), white chocolate macadamia (Naima), S'mores (Saleem), coconut pineapple (Graysen), red velvet (Liam), caramel apple (Avner), and lemon raspberry (Reggie). The twist was to make edible grass and dirt. Winner: Graysen Winner's Dish: Coconut cupcakes with pineapple filling and coconut buttercream with brown sugar crumble "dirt" with coconut "grass" Lost: Saleem Loser's Dish: Chocolate cupcake with toasted marshmallows and graham cracker crumbs (S'mores) with chocolate cookie crumble "dirt" with lime zest "grass"
5	"One Potato, Two Potato"	February 3, 2020
The bakers are asked to create sugar cookies and decorate them using potato stamps of their own design. The twist was to stamp a cookie with their first name initial. Winner: Morgan Winner's Dish: Lemon vanilla sugar cookie with royal icing Lost: Anthony Loser's Dish: Lime sugar cookie with lime royal icing
6	"Ice Cream Cone-a-Copia"	February 10, 2020
The kid bakers were tasked to make ice cream cupcakes inside ice cream cones. The twist was for them to make their own ice cream from scratch. Winner: Naima Winner's Dish: Maple bacon cupcakes with maple buttercream, topped with bacon and chocolate ganache Lost: Avner Loser's Dish: Mint chocolate chip cupcakes with mint chip mousse and mint chip buttercream with a side of mint chocolate chip ice cream
7	"Mama Mia!"	February 17, 2020
The bakers had to make a plate of Italian rainbow cookies with one of the following flavors: hazelnut, cherry, almond, lemon, apricot, and espresso. For the twist, they also had to make their own pizza bites to serve with their cookies. Winner: Reggie Winner's Dish: Hazelnut Italian rainbow cookies with strawberries and gianduja butter and prosciutto two-cheese pizza bites Lost: Naima Loser's Dish: Italian rainbow cookies with cherry jam filling, and chocolate ganache and pepperoni, spinach, mushroom and BBQ sauce pizza bite
8	"Architectural Digestible"	February 24, 2020
The five remaining kid bakers had to make decorative trifles inspired by interior design. The twist was to create granola from scratch. Winner: Reggie Winner's Dish: Vanilla pound cake with passion fruit fillings (curd and mousse), coconut mousse, honey cashew granola, raspberries, blackberries, and mangoes Lost: Liam Loser's Dish: Chocolate espresso cake with orange pastry cream, chocolate mousse, raspberries, Mandarin oranges, and chocolate granola
9	"Dinomighty"	March 3, 2020
The final four bakers were asked to make dinosaur sugar cookies, which had to stand on their own. The twist was for the kids to create an edible dinosaur egg. Winner: Sam Winner's Dish: Lemon-lime T-Rex cookie with vanilla royal icing and chocolate brownie egg Lost: Morgan Loser's Dish: Spiced sugar cookie with royal icing and spiced cake pop egg
10	"The Fruit of your Labor"	March 10, 2020
For the finale, the three bakers are challenged to make cakes decorated to look like fruits (pineapple, watermelon, or orange). The twist was to incorporate nuts (walnuts, almonds, or pecans) into their cake. Winner: Graysen Winner's Dish: Pineapple (chocolate cake with cream and almond caramel fillings, caramel buttercream, and white icing) Runner's Up: Reggie and Sam Reggie's Cake: Watermelon (orange olive oil chocolate chip cake with chocolate pecan mousse, orange curd and American buttercream) Sam's Cake: Orange (chocolate cake with cream cheese frosting, pastry cream and toasted walnuts)

== Season 9 ==
This was the first season recorded with social distancing measures due to the COVID-19 pandemic. Unique to this season, the contestants' parents are shown as they watch and react to the contest from a nearby location.

=== Contestants ===
Ages stated are at time of filming.

Rank	Baker	Age	Location	Place
1	Keaton Ashton	12	Sugar City, Idaho	Winner
2	Jonah Anderson	12	Harrisburg, Pennsylvania	Runners-up
2	Bella Luu	12	San Jose, California	Runners-up
4	Haylin Adams	11	Glasgow, Kentucky	4th Place
5	Nemo Tsai	10	Ann Arbor, Michigan	5th Place
6	D'Von Mills	12	Lithonia, Georgia	6th Place
7	Namiah Phillips	13	Long Beach, California	7th Place
8	Cydney Cain	11	Prospect Park, Pennsylvania	8th Place
9	Miabella Ramirez	11	Katy, Texas	9th Place
10	McKenzly Sandefer	11	Conway, Arkansas	10th Place
11	Trey Gordon	13	Davenport, Iowa	11th Place
12	Andrew Clark	11	Madison, Mississippi	12th Place

=== Elimination table ===
Place	Contestant	Episode									
Place	Contestant	1	2	3	4	5	6	7	8	9	10
1	Keaton	WIN	IN	IN	WIN	WIN	HIGH	IN	HIGH	LOW	WINNER
2	Jonah	IN	IN	WIN	LOW	WIN	WIN	IN	IN	HIGH	RUNNERS-UP
2	Bella	LOW	IN	IN	IN	HIGH	IN	WIN	LOW	WIN	RUNNERS-UP
4	Haylin	HIGH	IN	WIN	HIGH	IN	IN	HIGH	WIN	ELIM	
5	Nemo	IN	LOW	WIN	IN	IN	IN	LOW	ELIM		
6	D'Von	IN	HIGH	IN	IN	LOW	LOW	ELIM			
7	Namiah	IN	IN	IN	IN	IN	ELIM				
8	Cydney	IN	WIN	LOW	IN	ELIM					
9	Miabella	HIGH	IN	IN	ELIM						
10	McKenzly	LOW	IN	ELIM							
11	Trey	IN	ELIM								
12	Andrew	ELIM									

(WINNER) This baker won the competition.
(RUNNER-UP) This baker made it to the finale, and was in second place.
(WIN) This baker won the baking challenge.
(WIN) This baker was on the winning team of a team challenge.
(HIGH) Baker was one of the judges' favourite bakers that week, but didn't win.
(IN) Baker got through to the next round.
(LOW) Baker was one of the judges' least favourite bakers that week, but was not eliminated.
(ELIM) This baker was eliminated from the championship.

=== Episodes ===
Episodes
No. in season	Title	Original release date
1	"Flying Colors"	January 4, 2021
The contestants were given two hours to bake mini-cheesecakes with topped with a brushstroke design. The twist required the bakers to add a decoration representing their interests or personality. Winner: Keaton won with a smores cheesecake with a dog paw cookie. Eliminated: Andrew was sent home. The judges stated that his lemon cheesecake had broken brushstrokes and uneven crust.
2	"Garden of Eatin'"	January 4, 2021
The bakers were asked to make garden-themed sheet cakes topped with decorations made of only natural ingredients. The twist was to add edible dirt made of a component that was baked from scratch. Winner: Cydney won with a mango cake with lime buttercream and brownie soil. Eliminated: Trey was sent home after making a chocolate cherry cake. The judges stated that he did not fulfill the twist because his "dirt" was made from his cake, not a separately baked component.
3	"Party in the Sky"	January 11, 2021
The ten bakers were divided into teams of two to make cupcake rainbow displays. Each baker was assigned a flavor and made three colors of cupcakes, six total in each team. Each team was assigned a different frosting piping technique. The twist was that the bakers had to make meringue clouds. Top Team: Nemo and Jonah won autographed photos of Valerie and Duff. Winner: Haylin was the individual winner, making lemon cupcakes with lemon curd and lemon buttercream. Eliminated: McKenzly was eliminated after making peanut butter cupcakes with vanilla buttercream. The judges stated that excessive peanut butter made the cupcakes dry and dense.
4	"Three Square Meals"	January 18, 2021
For the season's dessert imposters challenge, the bakers were assigned to create impostors based on three types of meals (breakfast, lunch and dinner), each assigned to three of the bakers. The twist was to incorporate avocado into their dessert imposters. Winner: Keaton won with a hamburger made of orange cake and a brownie patty. Eliminated: Miabella made French toast with toppings (pound cake with candied bacon, mixed berries, avocado cream, and dulce de leche). The judges stated the cake was soggy and the toppings had not been transformed into imposters.
5	"Picnic Time"	January 25, 2021
The bakers were divided into four teams of two to make hand pies with an assigned filling and an updated version of "ants on a log". The twist was that one teammate would have to make caramel sauce to go with their team's hand pies. Top Team: Jonah and Keaton won for best overall design Winner: Jonah was also the individual winner for his blueberry nectarine hand pie. Eliminated: Cydney was sent home after making a cranberry apple hand pie. The judges stated the crust that was falling apart and the filling was too tart.
6	"The Spice Is Right"	January 25, 2021
The bakers were tasked to make desserts of their choice using Chinese five-spice. The twist was to incorporate fresh ginger. Winner: Jonah won with five-spice macarons with espresso ginger buttercream. Eliminated: Namiah made eclairs with five-spice pastry cream and chocolate ganache. The judges said that the chocolate overwhelmed the five-spice flavor and the eclairs did not puff up enough.
7	"Puppy Treats"	February 1, 2021
Inspired by puppies that were on set to promote the Puppy Bowl, the bakers were asked to make puppy birthday cakes. They had to use an assigned flavor, add a cookie name tag, and decorate the cake to depict a dog activity. The twist was to incorporate peanut butter. Winner: Bella won with a cookies and cream cake depicting a park scene. After the show, Bella's family adopted Biscuit, one of the puppies. Eliminated: D'Von was sent home after baking a strawberry cake. The judges stated that his beach scene decoration was minimal and messy.
8	"Edible Expressions"	February 8, 2021
The five bakers were tasked to bake expressive cookie faces with 3-D features (eyes, nose, mouth, and ears). The twist was to bake an accessory to put on the face. Winner: Haylin won with a lime cookie with lime buttercream and surprised expression. Eliminated: Nemo was eliminated. He made a sugar cookie with cream cheese frosting, but the judges thought the happy expression was unclear and the decoration was rushed.
9	"Cereal Pie Squared"	February 19, 2021
The bakers were asked to make 2-in-1 sheet pan pies with distinct fillings in each half. For the twist, they had to add colorful, painted designs on their pie crust. Winner: Bella won with a peach-cherry and lemon meringue pie. Eliminated: Haylin was sent home after making a chocolate pecan and apple pie. The judges noted that the apple filling was undercooked and the pie lacked decoration after her lattice broke.
10	"Location, Location, Location"	February 19, 2021
The final three bakers baked biome cakes. The last twist was to add gelatin to their cake. Winner:Keaton won and became the Kids Baking Champion. He made a chocolate cake with chocolate mousse and a raspberry curd (Biome: desert) Bella's Cake: Red velvet cake with white chocolate mousse and cream cheese frosting (Biome: tropical rainforest) Jonah's Cake: Coconut cake with lime curd & pineapple buttercream (Biome: coral reef)

== Season 10 ==
Twelve bakers compete for the title of Kids Baking Champion and $25,000. Duff Goldman and Valerie Bertinelli are the hosts and judges again.

=== Contestants ===
Ages stated are at time of filming.

Rank	Baker	Age	Location	Place
1	Nadya Alborz	10	Knoxville, Tennessee	Winner
2	Ellora Martinez	9	Yorba Linda, California	Runners-up
2	Sarah Patel	10	Knoxville, Tennessee	Runners-up
4	Summer Haque	10	Yorba Linda, California	4th Place
5	Riya Shah	11	Fort Myers, Florida	5th Place
6	Lucia Calonge	10	Cincinnati, Ohio	6th Place
7	Santiago Corso	11	Huntington Beach, California	7th Place
8	Joseph Bostick	10	San Diego, California	8th Place
9	Caroline Gross	10	York, Pennsylvania	9th Place
10	Benjamin Steinhauser	8	Hillsborough, New Jersey	10th Place
11	Finley Sheers	9	McLean, Virginia	11th Place
12	Ava-Leigh Wright	10	Atlanta, Georgia	12th Place

=== Elimination table ===
Place	Contestant	Episode									
Place	Contestant	1	2	3	4	5	6	7	8	9	10
1	Nadya	IN	IN	WIN	WIN	IN	IN	IN	LOW	LOW	WINNER
2	Ellora	HIGH	IN	HIGH	IN	HIGH	WIN	LOW	HIGH	WIN	RUNNERS-UP
2	Sarah	IN	IN	WIN	HIGH	IN	IN	WIN	WIN	LOW	RUNNERS-UP
4	Summer	WIN	IN	IN	IN	IN	HIGH	HIGH	LOW	ELIM	
5	Riya	IN	WIN	WIN	IN	WIN	IN	IN	ELIM		
6	Lucia	IN	IN	WIN	IN	LOW	LOW	ELIM			
7	Santiago	IN	IN	IN	IN	IN	ELIM				
8	Joseph	HIGH	IN	LOW	LOW	ELIM					
9	Caroline	IN	HIGH	WIN	ELIM						
10	Ben	LOW	LOW	ELIM							
11	Finley	IN	ELIM								
12	Ava-Leigh	ELIM									

(WINNER) This baker won the competition.
(RUNNER-UP) This baker made it to the finale, and was in second place.
(WIN) This baker won the baking challenge.
(WIN) This baker was on the winning team of a team challenge.
(HIGH) Baker was one of the judges' favourite bakers that week, but didn't win.
(IN) Baker got through to the next round.
(LOW) Baker was one of the judges' least favourite bakers that week, but was not eliminated.
(ELIM) This baker was eliminated from the championship.

=== Episodes ===
Episodes
No. in season	Title	Original release date
1	"Float Like a Butterfly"	December 27, 2021
Duff and Valerie celebrated the youngest cast in the series by challenging the twelve bakers to make butterfly cakes with assigned flavors. Those flavors were: orange (Caroline), chocolate (Summer), coconut (Ben), cherry (Riya), espresso (Lucia), strawberry (Finley), chai (Joseph), red velvet (Nadya), banana (Ellora), raspberry (Sarah), lime (Ava-Leigh), and mango (Santiago). The twist was that the bakers had to make three edible flowers for their cakes. Winner: Summer Winner's Dish: Chocolate cake with cinnamon buttercream Lost: Ava-Leigh Loser's Dish: Lime cake with lime buttercream
2	"Everything but the Kitchen Sink"	January 3, 2022
Duff and Valerie challenged the eleven bakers to make kitchen sink desserts using pretzels, chocolate candies, and potato chips. The desserts were: cookie bar (Summer, Ben, and Finley), blondies (Sarah and Ellora), tart (Santiago, Riya, and Lucia), and mini cheesecake (Joseph, Nadya, and Caroline). The twist was each baker had to have a side of popcorn to match their kitchen sink desserts. Winner: Riya Winner's Dish: A tart with a pretzel crust, potato chip pastry cream, chocolate candies with Indian popcorn Lost: Finley Loser's Dish: Sugar cookie cookie bar with snack mix with cheddar cheese popcorn
3	"Dessert Rivals"	January 10, 2022
Valerie Bertinelli prefers chocolate, and Duff Goldman prefers peanut butter. They divided the remaining ten bakers into teams and asked them to make chocolate or peanut butter versions of assigned desserts: sandwich cookie (Lucia and Ben), pie (Nadya and Santiago), whoopie pie (Sarah and Summer), cupcakes (Caroline and Joseph), and poke cake (Riya and Ellora). The twist was each baker had to incorporate jam or jelly into their desserts. Top Team: Team Chocolate (Sarah, Nadya, Caroline, Riya, and Lucia) Winner: Sarah Winner's Dish: Chocolate whoopie pie with strawberry jam Lost: Ben Loser's Dish: Peanut butter chip cookie sandwich with blueberry jam
4	"Cereal Psych-Out"	January 17, 2022
Duff and Valerie asked the remaining nine bakers to create a cookie cereal made of mini-cookies and chocolate-covered fruit or nuts. The twist was each baker had to make a mousse as their "milk". The fruits and nuts were: cherry (Lucia), pineapple (Caroline), blueberries (Santiago), apricots (Riya), raisins (Sarah), almonds (Summer), macadamia nuts (Ellora), hazelnuts (Joseph), and pecans (Nadya) Winner: Nadya Winner's Dish: Oatmeal date cookies with chocolate-covered pecans and a spiced mousse Lost: Caroline Loser's Dish: Coconut cookies with chocolate-covered pineapple and a chocolate coconut mousse
5	"All Puffed Up"	January 24, 2022
Duff and Valerie challenged the bakers in teams of two to make cream puff board designs with two different colors. They were assigned flavors: cookies and cream (Nadya), blackberry (Sarah), passion fruit (Ellora), cookie butter (Summer), ginger (Riya), key lime (Santiago), maple (Lucia), and green apple (Joseph). The twist was each baker had to make a monster or other character out of one of their cream puffs. Winner: Riya Winner's Dish: A cream puff with dark green craquelin and ginger whipped cream and pastry cream Lost: Joseph Loser's Dish: A cream puff with green craquelin and green apple whipped cream
6	"BBQ Impostors"	January 31, 2022
Duff and Valerie asked the remaining seven bakers to whip up some BBQ dessert impostors with a side. The assigned dishes were: salmon & asparagus (Ellora), hot dog & baked beans (Riya), kebabs & corn (Santiago), chicken & cole slaw (Sarah), ribs & mac and cheese (Summer), burger & BBQ chips (Lucia), and steak & potato salad (Nadya). The twist was each person had to incorporate lemon somewhere in their impostor. Winner: Ellora Winner's Dish: Lime cake (salmon) and sugar cookies (asparagus) with candied lemon Lost: Santiago Loser's Dish: Cardamom brownie (meat) and passion fruit coconut cake with lemon frosting (corn)
7	"Earn your Stripes"	February 7, 2022
Duff and Valerie challenged the last six bakers to make colorful zebra cakes. Each cake has to have white, black and a color that was chosen. The twist was that the bakers had to put a zebra face on their cake. The assigned colors were pink (Lucia), blue (Summer), turquoise (Sarah), orange (Riya), purple (Ellora), and green (Nadya). Winner: Sarah Winner's Dish: White cake with a raspberry filling and a citrus buttercream Lost: Lucia Loser's Dish: Vanilla cake with vanilla buttercream
8	"Cosmic Delights"	February 14, 2022
The remaining five bakers were tasked to make pull-apart cupcake designs based on a space theme. The twist was to add an edible alien or UFO that must be baked. The assigned themes were Saturn (Nadya), the sun (Sarah), the moon (Ellora), a comet (Riya), and a rocket (Summer). Winner: Sarah Winner's Dish: Carrot cake cupcakes with cream cheese buttercream and a shortbread thumbprint cookie Lost: Riya Loser's Dish: Lemon blueberry cupcakes with blueberry cream cheese buttercream and a sugar cookie
9	"Shake, Shake, Shake"	February 21, 2022
Duff and Valerie challenged the four semifinal bakers to make a loaded milkshake with no assigned flavor. They had to make ice cream from scratch and two different baked treats of any type. The twist was to make a flavored whipped cream to top off the milkshakes. Winner: Ellora Winner's Dish: Chocolate milkshake with maple bacon doughnut & brownie with chocolate espresso whipped cream Lost: Summer Loser's Dish: Cookie butter milkshake with snickerdoodles & blondies with cookie butter cinnamon whipped cream
10	"Cityscapes"	February 21, 2022
For the final challenge, the bakers were given the task of creating cakes based on cityscapes of an assigned American city. The twist was to incorporate an assigned tree commonly found in their respective cities. The assigned themes were Washington, D.C. with cherry blossom trees (Ellora), New York with maple trees (Sarah), and San Francisco with sequoia trees (Nadya). Winner: Nadya Winner's Dish: White cake with strawberry jam & rosewater buttercream Runner's Up: Ellora and Sarah Ellora's Cake: Confetti cake with lemon curd, raspberries, cream cheese mousse & vanilla buttercream Sarah's Cake: Cookies & cream cake with chocolate & vanilla mousse & vanilla buttercream

== Season 11 ==
12 bakers compete for the title of Kids Baking Champion and $25,000. Duff Goldman and Valerie Bertinelli are the hosts and judges again in this business-themed season of the series.

=== Contestants ===
Ages stated are at time of filming.

Rank	Baker	Age	Location	Place
1	Naiel Chaudry	12	Los Altos, California	Winner
2	Sohan Jhaveri	13	Denver, Colorado	Runners-up
2	Naho Yanagi	13	Morgan Hill, California	Runners-up
4	Genevieve Kashat	10	Detroit, Michigan	4th Place
5	Alissa Telusca	12	Naples, Florida	5th Place
6	Nash Roe	13	Clive, Iowa	6th Place
7	Ozan Kopelman	13	New York, New York	7th Place
8	Jason Chan	12	Boston, Massachusetts	8th Place
9	Peyton Waldrep	11	Baton Rouge, Louisiana	9th Place
10	Foster Smith	11	Norfolk, Virginia	10th Place
11	Toby Hyun	11	Dallas, Texas	11th Place
12	Logan Brod	12	New York, New York	12th Place

=== Elimination table ===
Place	Contestant	Episode									
Place	Contestant	1	2	3	4	5	6	7	8	9	10
1	Naiel	IN	IN	WIN	IN	IN	HIGH	WIN	LOW	HIGH	WINNER
2	Sohan	HIGH	LOW	HIGH	HIGH	IN	IN	IN	HIGH	LOW	RUNNERS-UP
2	Naho	LOW	IN	WIN	WIN	IN	IN	WIN	WIN	WIN	RUNNERS-UP
4	Genevieve	HIGH	IN	WIN	WIN	LOW	WIN	WIN	IN	ELIM	
5	Alissa	IN	IN	IN	IN	IN	IN	LOW	ELIM		
6	Nash	IN	IN	WIN	LOW	HIGH	LOW	ELIM			
7	Ozan	IN	HIGH	WIN	IN	WIN	ELIM				
8	Jason	IN	WIN	IN	IN	ELIM					
9	Peyton	IN	IN	LOW	ELIM						
10	Foster	IN	IN	ELIM							
11	Toby	WIN	ELIM								
12	Logan	ELIM									

(WINNER) This baker won the competition.
(RUNNER-UP) This baker made it to the finale and was in second place.
(WIN) This baker won the baking challenge.
(WIN) This baker was on the winning team of a team challenge.
(HIGH) Baker was one of the judges' favourite bakers that week, but didn't win.
(IN) Baker got through to the next round.
(LOW) Baker was one of the judges' least favourite bakers that week, but was not eliminated.
(ELIM) This baker was eliminated from the championship.

=== Episodes ===
No. in Episode	Title	Original air date
1	"Great First Impressions"	December 26, 2022
Duff and Valerie have the kids bakers make their best selling desserts while using the psychology of color. The first twist was to make a colorful sauce to go along with their dessert. Winner: Toby Winner's Dish: White chocolate chip matcha cookies with a berry coulis (Colors: red and green) Lost: Logan Loser's Dish: Coffee vanilla macarons with a chocolate espresso syrup (Colors: purple and black)
2	"Smashing Success"	January 2, 2023
Duff and Valerie challenge the bakers to "smash" two desserts and come up with a name in hopes of it going viral and staying in the competition. The twist was they had to incorporate tie dye colors into their desserts. Winner: Jason Winner's Dish: Pina Colada-Cake-Cotta [Cake with coconut panna cotta and pineapple jam] (Mash-up: upside down cake and panna cotta) Lost: Toby Loser's Dish: Chur-co pizza [Churro disk with Mexican chocolate pastry cream and graham cracker crumble) (Mash-up: chocolate cream pie and churros)
3	"Logo-a-Gogo"	January 9, 2023
The kid bakers make logo cakes and are split into two teams. Chocolate: Naiel, Naho, Genevieve, Ozan, and Nash; Vanilla: Foster, Peyton, Alissa, Jason, and Sohan. The twist was to include some almonds in their cakes. Winner: Naiel Winner's Dish: Chocolate cake with cinnamon pastry cream and almond mascarpone frosting with toasted almond slices Lost: Foster Loser's Dish: Vanilla cake with coffee pastry cream and almond buttercream with almond, chocolate, and pretzel mix filling
4	"Festival Fare"	January 16, 2023
The bakers are challenged by Duff and Valerie to make desserts in a jar that they get to taste test. The baker with the most likes gets immunity. The twist was to bake a crumble to go with their desserts. Winner: Genevieve Winner's Dish: Cheesecake in a jar (graham cracker crust, no-bake cheesecake filling, raspberry jam, and a raspberry cookie crumble) Most Liked Dessert: Naho Dish: Banana pudding in a jar (sugar cookie crust, vanilla pudding with banana slices, whipped cream, chocolate drizzle, and a cinnamon crumble) Lost: Peyton Loser's Dish: Berry shortcake in a jar (strawberry-raspberry curd, biscuit with strawberries, whipped cream, and biscuit crumble with pretzels and dried raspberries)
5	"8 Little Bakers Go to Market"	January 23, 2023
Duff and Valerie have the bakers make viral cupcakes with viral flavors in hope to stay in the competition. The twist was the bakers had to team up to create a cupcake that will go viral. The winning team was Genevieve and Naiel, and as a special prize, they received cupcake pillows, courtesy of Duff and Valerie. Winner: Ozan Winner's Dish: Chocolate cupcake with graham cracker crust, toasted marshmallow cream frosting, and chocolate ganache drizzle with chocolate-dipped graham cracker (market trend: S'mores) Winning Team's Cupcake: Genevieve and Naiel's Chocolate cake with jalapeno pastry cream and mango American buttercream Lost: Jason Loser's Dish: Red velvet cupcake with whipped chocolate ganache and cream cheese frosting (market trend: Red velvet)
6	"Power Lunch Imposters"	January 30, 2023
The bakers are challenged to make power lunch food imposters. The twist was to make escargot to add to their power lunch food imposter desserts, using snail shells as their guide. Winner: Genevieve Winner's Dish: Cobb salad [Coconut (lettuce), Butterscotch blondie (chicken), cherries (tomatoes), kiwi (avocado), and candied bacon (bacon)] with boba escargot Lost: Ozan Loser's Dish: Lobster tail (rice cereal treat with lemon buttercream) and corn on the cob (lemon-vanilla cake pop with marzipan) with cake escargot
7	"Interview with a Baker"	February 6, 2023
The bakers are split into two teams with a team leader to create shaped cream puff cakes, with each member facing off based on a flavor. Naiel, Naho and Genevieve are on one team, and the other team is Sohan, Alissa and Nash (with Genevieve and Sohan as the team leaders). The twist was to add a ganache on their cream puff cakes. Winning Team: Genevieve’s team Lost: Nash Loser's Dish: Square cream puff cake with blackberry mascarpone cream filling and chocolate ganache
8	"The Customer is Always Right"	February 13, 2023
The bakers have to make desserts with interesting flavor combinations in any dessert of their choice, except cakes. The twist was to add black pepper to their desserts. Winner: Naho Winner's Dish: Black pepper eclair with miso and maple syrup pastry cream and a black pepper sugar cookie Lost: Alissa Loser's Dish: Fried yeasted donut with black pepper, topped banana diplomat cream, grapefruit curd mixed with whipped cream, and a black pepper glaze
9	"Cookies are for Closers"	February 20, 2023
The kid bakers are tasked to make two different types of cookies loaded with three toppings/fillings each, two of which they had to make. For this twist, they need to add tea to go with their cookies. Winner: Naho Winner's Dish: Caramel bits cookie with cinnamon candied bacon, American buttercream, and chocolate ganache drizzle; Matcha sugar cookie with Swiss meringue, strawberry curd, and white chocolate and matcha drizzle Lost: Genevieve Loser's Dish: Bacon and chocolate chip cookie with Swiss meringue buttercream and salted caramel filling; Peanut butter chip cookie with Chai Swiss meringue buttercream and cereal mix filling
10	"Birthdays are Big Business"	February 27, 2023
The final three bakers show off their business and baking skills as they create themed birthday cakes for the $25,000 grand prize. For the twist, the bakers must create a functional yet edible birthday candle for their cakes. Winner:Naiel Winner's Dish: Vanilla cake with lime curd, coconut pastry cream, toasted coconut flakes, blue ombre buttercream, and lavender sugar cookie candle with almond wick (Theme: Sailing) Runners Up: Naho and Sohan Naho's Cake: Ginger cake with peach compote, ginger pastry cream, peach Italian meringue buttercream, and modeling chocolate candle with a wafer paper wick (Theme: Skateboarding) Sohan's Cake: Lemon blueberry cake with lemon curd, blueberry coulis, green ombre buttercream, and coating chocolate candle with almond wick (Theme: Gardening)

== Season 12 ==
Twelve bakers compete for the title of Kids Baking Champion and $25,000. Duff Goldman and Valerie Bertinelli are the hosts and judges in this "Bake to School"-themed season of the series. It was Valerie Bertinelli's last season on the series.

=== Contestants ===
Ages stated are at time of filming.

Rank	Baker	Age	Location	Place
1	Lila Smethurst	11	San Antonio, Texas	Winner
2	Tasi Savage	12	Kailua Kona, Hawaii	Runners-Up
2	Oscar Stowell	12	Marin County, California	Runners-Up
4	Levi Dubner	13	Boca Raton, Florida	4th Place
5	Elsie Stark	9	Abilene, Texas	5th Place
6	Anaiah Hodges	10	Manvel, Texas	6th Place
7	Camryn Williams	11	Charlotte, North Carolina	7th Place
8	Jaime Lee	11	Yorktown, Virginia	8th Place
9	Leland Jackson	12	Lubbock, Texas	9th Place
10	Madison Lendor	10	Monroe, New York	10th Place
11	Andy Coyle	11	Redwood City, California	11th Place
12	Henry Muranaka	11	Bountiful, Utah	12th Place

=== Elimination table ===
Place	Contestant	Episode									
Place	Contestant	1	2	3	4	5	6	7	8	9	10
1	Lila	LOW	IN	LOW	IN	WIN	IN	IN	WIN	WIN	WINNER
2	Tasi	WIN	IN	IN	LOW	IN	LOW	HIGH	LOW	HIGH	RUNNERS-UP
2	Oscar	IN	IN	IN	IN	HIGH	HIGH	WIN	HIGH	LOW	RUNNERS-UP
4	Levi	IN	HIGH	WIN	HIGH	IN	WIN	IN	IN	ELIM	
5	Elsie	HIGH	IN	LOW	IN	IN	IN	LOW	ELIM		
6	Anaiah	IN	WIN	IN	WIN	IN	IN	ELIM			
7	Camryn	IN	IN	IN	IN	LOW	ELIM				
8	Jaime	HIGH	HIGH	IN	IN	ELIM					
9	Leland	LOW	IN	HIGH	ELIM						
10	Madison	IN	LOW	ELIM							
11	Andy	IN	ELIM								
12	Henry	ELIM									

(WINNER) This baker won the competition.
(RUNNER-UP) This baker made it to the finale, and was in second place.
(WIN) This baker won the baking challenge.
(WIN) This baker was on the winning team of a team challenge.
(HIGH) Baker was one of the judges' favourite bakers that week, but didn't win.
(IN) Baker got through to the next round.
(LOW) Baker was one of the judges' least favourite bakers that week, but was not eliminated.
(ELIM) This baker was eliminated from the championship.

=== Episodes ===
Episodes
No. in season	Title	Original release date
1	"Picture This"	January 1, 2024
Inspired by school picture day, the 12 bakers are tasked to bake portrait cakes in assigned flavors and decorated with an edible photo and three emojis to represent their interests. For the mid-round twist, the bakers have to include ricotta or mascarpone cheese in their cake. Winner: Tasi Eliminated: Henry
2	"Jumping for Joy"	January 8, 2024
In honor of recess, the contestants create blondie hopscotch puzzles surrounded by an edible playground scene. For the twist, the bakers have to add an edible tree. Winner: Anaiah Eliminated: Andy
3	"Bake Sale"	January 15, 2024
Paired into five teams of two, the competitors must stock and decorate their own bake sale booths. Each baker makes a dozen individually-packaged portions of two assigned sweets. For the twist, each team must make a dozen cereal treats that are "loaded" with add-ins. Winner: Levi Eliminated: Madison
4	"Art Is in the Pie of the Beholder"	January 22, 2024
In honor of art class, the nine bakers are tasked to make colored mosaic pies (mousse or cream pies with gelatin pieces inside). For the mid-round twist, Duff and Valerie have the kids bake an edible frame around their pies. Winner: Anaiah Eliminated: Leland
5	"School Play"	January 29, 2024
The kid bakers are once again paired into teams to make cakes inspired by the happy/comedy and sad/tragedy theater masks in celebration of drama club. For the twist, each team has to add an edible marquee to their cake. Winner: Lila is the individual winner. The winning team of Lila and Oscar receive autographed drama masks from Duff and Valerie. Eliminated: Jaime
6	"Spelling Bee Buzz"	February 5, 2024
Inspired by the school spelling bee, the bakers are tasked with creating tarts with an assigned flavor and an assigned baking word written on top. For the twist, the bakers must include blueberries. Winner: Levi Eliminated: Camryn
7	"Lunch Bell"	February 12, 2024
For this season's dessert imposters challenge, the bakers must create desserts that look like different school lunch entrées and side dishes commonly served at the cafeteria. The twist requires the addition of fresh oranges somewhere in the dish. Winner: Oscar Eliminated: Anaiah
8	"Library Visit"	February 19, 2024
In honor of the school library, the five remaining bakers must create their own book desserts. The mid-round twist is for the kids to make edible bookmarks to go with their books. Winner: Lila Eliminated: Elsie
9	"Spirit Day"	February 26, 2024
In honor of school spirit day, the semi-finalists are challenged to make a dozen tie-dye glazed doughnuts and ice cream with swirled fillings. The twist requires the addition of a baked mix-in to their ice cream. Winner: Lila Eliminated: Levi
10	"Science Fair"	March 1, 2024
The science fair is celebrated as the three finalists create volcano cakes with a dry ice smoke effect. Each baker randomly picks a location: polar (Lila), tropical (Tasi), and forest (Oscar). The twist requires the bakers to add sugar flames on top. Winner: Lila Runners Up: Oscar and Tasi

== Season 13 ==
Season 13 is themed around "Amazing Animals". This season introduces the first permanent hosting change for the series, as Duff Goldman is joined by Kardea Brown, who replaces Valerie Bertinelli as co-host and judge.

=== Contestants ===
Ages stated are at time of filming.

Rank	Baker	Age	Location	Place
1	Micah Parsons	11	Stephenville, Texas	WINNER
2	Piper Lowe	12	Kansas City, Kansas	RUNNERS- UP
2	Arielle Yang	10	Sandy, Utah	RUNNERS- UP
4	Carly Van Pelt	10	Lake Geneva, Wisconsin	4th place
5	Aria Karayil	11	Danville, California	5th place
6	Brooklyn Barrett	11	Orlando, Florida	6th place
7	Jack Whalen	13	West Richland, Washington	7th place
8	Ella Hayek	10	Ann Arbor, Michigan	8th place
9	Carter Siporin	11	Perkasie, Pennsylvania	9th place
10	Noah Azeez	12	Toronto, Canada	10th place
11	Pierce Sario	11	Atlanta, Georgia	11th place
12	Ellvie Smith	11	Attalla, Alabama	12th place

=== Elimination table ===
Place	Contestant	Episode									
Place	Contestant	1	2	3	4	5	6	7	8	9	10
1	Micah	IN	IN	IN	IN	WIN	WIN	WIN	IN	LOW	WINNER
2	Piper	HIGH	IN	IN	IN	LOW	IN	IN	WIN	WIN	RUNNERS-UP
2	Arielle	WIN	LOW	WIN	HIGH	LOW	IN	HIGH	LOW	HIGH	RUNNERS-UP
4	Carly	IN	IN	HIGH	WIN	LOW	IN	LOW	HIGH	ELIM	
5	Aria	IN	IN	IN	LOW	WIN	HIGH	IN	ELIM		
6	Brooklyn	LOW	WIN	LOW	IN	WIN	LOW	ELIM			
7	Jack	IN	HIGH	HIGH	IN	WIN	ELIM				
8	Ella	IN	IN	WIN	IN	ELIM					
9	Carter	IN	IN	IN	ELIM						
10	Noah	IN	IN	ELIM							
11	Pierce	IN	ELIM								
12	Ellvie	ELIM									

(WINNER) This baker won the competition.
(RUNNER-UP) This baker made it to the finale, and was in second place.
(WIN) This baker won the baking challenge.
(WIN) This baker was on the winning team of a team challenge.
(HIGH) Baker was one of the judges' favourite bakers that week, but didn't win.
(IN) Baker got through to the next round.
(LOW) Baker was one of the judges' least favourite bakers that week, but was not eliminated.
(ELIM) This baker was eliminated from the championship.

=== Episodes ===
Episodes
No. in season	Title	Original release date
1	"Scales, Feathers, Fur and Fins"	January 6, 2025
For their first challenge of the season, twelve kid bakers had two and a half hours to make tarts topped with the texture of the scales, feathers, fur, or fins of a selected animal. The tart also had to contain a flavor inspired by their animal's color. The mid-round twist was to add the animal's tail as an edible add-on. Winner: Arielle won with a lime chameleon tart with peanut butter cookie tail. The judges praised the tart's colorful decor and buttery crust. Eliminated: Ellvie was sent home. The judges stated that her betta fish tart had an overbaked crust and too little filling.
2	"Macaronimals"	January 13, 2025
The contestants had two and a half hours to make a dozen macarons shaped like the face of an assigned animal. The twist was to create an edible habitat on which to present their macaronimals. Winner: Brooklyn won with frog macarons with lemon and peach filling. The judges praised the consistency of the macaron batter and the rice cereal treat trees in the habitat. Eliminated: Pierce was sent home. The judges liked the flavor of his coconut monkey macarons with banana ears. However, he only made 7 of the required 12 macarons.
3	"Doggone Good"	January 20, 2025
In a promotion for the movie Dog Man, the bakers were paired in teams of two and given three hours to make half-dog, half-human cakes. One team member baked a 6 in (15 cm) top tier depicting the head of an assigned dog breed, and the other baked an 8 in (20 cm) bottom tier depicting a body with an assigned human occupation. The twist was to incorporate bacon. Winning Team: Ella and Arielle won with their Cocker Spaniel pilot cake. The judges stated that they enjoyed the texture and flavors of both Ella's vanilla maple bacon tier and Arielle's red velvet tier. Eliminated: Noah was sent home. The judges said that his chef-themed coconut pineapple cake was dense and was collapsing due to excess liquid.
4	"Sea Creature Sweets"	January 27, 2025
In a promotion for Disney Cruise Line, the bakers were given two and a half hours to make desserts depicting a selected sea animal in a beach or ocean scene. The bakers were free to make any type of dessert. The twist was to make a mix-in for vanilla ice cream, which was provided. Winner: Carly won with a crab beach scene blondie. The judges enjoyed its texture, coconut white chocolate flavor, and salty cracker topping. As the winner, she received a family vacation from Disney Cruise Line. Eliminated: Carter was sent home after making a butterscotch brownie with pâte à choux dolphins. The judges stated that the dolphins (originally intended to be éclairs) did not puff up at all. They also said he added too much ruby chocolate into the ice cream, creating an unpleasant flavor.
5	"Paws for Applause"	February 3, 2025
In a promotion for the Puppy Bowl, the bakers made randomly assigned desserts decorated with a paw print and presented on a "gridiron" board. Pairs of bakers who made the same dessert type competed head-to-head. The twist was to make a dessert bark. Winners: Jack was the overall winner, winning the layered brownie bars competition. Brooklyn won the mini cheesecakes competition, Aria won mini layer cakes competition, and Micah won the cookie sandwiches competition. All winners were safe from elimination. Eliminated: Ella was sent home after making brownie bars with cream cheese and raspberry curd. The judges stated that the brownie's excess cocoa powder caused a dry mouth feel.
6	"Delightful Dessert Domes"	February 10, 2025
In a promotion for the film Smurfs, the bakers were asked to make dome cakes decorated with a Smurf version of their own face and objects that depict their interests. For the twist, they had to make cookies shaped like a selected Australian animal. (The hosts explained that Australia appears in the film.) Winner: Micah won. The judges praised the flavor and texture of his vanilla cake with peach filling, cereal treat decorations, and kangaroo shortbread cookies. Eliminated: Jack was sent home. The judges stated that his lemon cake and kangaroo cookies were underbaked.
7	"Animal Snackers"	February 17, 2025
For this season's dessert imposters challenge, the bakers made imposters of an assigned pet's favorite food. The twist was to add an herb, spice, or vegetable chosen from two options. Winner: Micah won with a salmon fillet for cats (brownie with Ceylon cinnamon buttercream). The judges praised its appearance and the brownie's rich, fudgy quality. Eliminated: Brooklyn was sent home after making an ear of corn for birds (strawberry cake with mango jam). The judges said they could not taste the required twist ingredient allspice and there were gaps in the kernel decoration.
8	"Going Underground"	February 24, 2025
The bakers made terrarium trifles with three distinct layers, topped with vegetation and an assigned bug decoration. The twist was to add an assigned flower decoration. Winner: Piper won, making a trifle with vanilla cake, cookies and cream filling, peanut butter mousse, and rainbow scarab decoration. The judges praised both its appearance and flavors. Eliminated: Aria was sent home. While the judges liked the brownie in her caterpillar trifle, they criticized the overpowering taste of orange extract in the pastry cream.
9	"Were You Born in a Barn?"	March 3, 2025
The contestants were asked to bake a cookie house for animals, served with a dipping sauce in a miniature bucket. The twist was to make haystack cookies (no-bake cookies made with crunchy chow mein noodles). Winner: Piper won, making a barn with vanilla almond cookies. The judges liked its candy glass windows and peach pie dipping sauce. Eliminated: Carly was sent home. The judges stated that her cookie dog house had messy construction.
10	"You Belong in a Zoo"	March 3, 2025
For the final challenge, the three remaining bakers had five hours to make zoo cakes. They selected from three themes: Arielle had forest predator enclosure, Piper had monkey enclosure, and Micah had African safari enclosure. The twist was to add popcorn to the cake. Winner: Micah won Kids Baking Championship. He made a red velvet cake with sandwich cookie and cream cheese filling, decorated with savannah animals and ombré frosting.

== Baking Championship: Next Gen ==
A spinoff series titled Baking Championship: Next Gen premiered on Food Network on January 5, 2026. The series is again hosted by Duff Goldman and Kardea Brown and follows a format similar to Kids Baking Championship but features contestants in twelve teams of siblings, aged 8–14.

=== Contestants ===
Ages listed are at time of the first episode's filming.

Rank	Bakers	Location	Place
1	Abigail (14) & Kenneth (10) Wolf	Geneseo, Illinois	WINNER
2	Leia (13) & Kiera (11) Sievert	Gilbert, Arizona	RUNNERS- UP
2	Genesis (12) & Akbar (10) Brooks	Tacoma, Washington	RUNNERS- UP
4	Maci (12) & Emmett (10) Sheets	Omak, Washington	4th place
5	Jovie (13) & Lenore (11) Byler	Atlanta, Georgia	5th place
6	Harper (12) & Holland (8) Carroll	Boston, Massachusetts	6th place
7	Leila (14) & Melody (11) Nouri	Porter Ranch, California	7th place
8	Abby (14) & Cameron (11) Bellezza	Plymouth Meeting, Pennsylvania	8th place
9	Taanvi (10) & Kavya (8) Bhenderu	Cypress, Texas	9th place
10	Olivia (12) & Norah (12) Tatum	Dallas, Texas	10th place
11/12	Liam (13) & Michael (10) Nelson	Pleasant Grove, Utah	11th/12th place
11/12	Clara (11) & Amelia (10) Friesenhahn	New Braunfels, Texas	11th/12th place

=== Elimination table ===
Place	Team	Episode								
Place	Team	1 (Note: In episode 1, no winner was named, but the judges praised three teams for their performance in different categories.)	2	3	4	5	6	7	8	9
1	Abigail & Kenneth	IN	IN	IN	IN	HIGH	IN	LOW	WIN	WINNER
2	Leia & Kiera	HIGH	IN	HIGH	WIN	IN	HIGH	WIN	HIGH	RUNNERS-UP
2	Genesis & Akbar	HIGH	IN	IN	LOW	LOW	WIN	IN	LOW	RUNNERS-UP
4	Maci & Emmett	IN	IN	WIN	IN	WIN	LOW	HIGH	ELIM	
5	Jovie & Lenore	IN	WIN	LOW	HIGH	IN	IN	ELIM		
6	Harper & Holland	HIGH	HIGH	IN	IN	IN	ELIM			
7	Leila & Melody	LOW	IN	IN	IN	ELIM				
8	Abby & Cameron	IN	IN	IN	ELIM					
9	Taanvi & Kavya	IN	LOW	ELIM						
10	Olivia & Norah	IN	ELIM							
11/12	Liam & Michael	ELIM								
11/12	Clara & Amelia	ELIM								

(WINNER) This team won the competition.
(RUNNER-UP) This team made it to the finale, and was in second place.
(WIN) This team won the challenge.
(HIGH) This team had one of the best dishes.
(LOW) This team had one of the lowest-ranked dishes.
(ELIM) This team was eliminated.

=== Episodes ===
Episodes
No. in season	Title	Original release date
1	"The Tryouts"	January 5, 2026
Duff and Kardea welcomed 24 new contestants in 12 teams of siblings. They were given two skills tests to determine which ten teams would move on to the competition proper. Skills Test #1: The teams were given two hours to make a dozen cupcakes with frosting. Skills Test #2: The teams were given two and a half hours to make a pie from scratch. Kardea and Duff judged the teams based on both tests. The teams of Clara & Amelia and Liam & Michael were sent home.
2	"Family Favorite"	January 12, 2026
The teams were given two and a half hours to make their "family favorite" dessert with flavors and decorations that relate to their family. In a dance break, Abby & Cameron were awarded five extra minutes of bake time. After deciding they didn't need it, they gave the extra time to Leila & Melody. Jovie & Lenore won the challenge. Olivia & Norah were sent home.
3	"A Trip to Remember"	January 19, 2026
The teams had two and a half hours to make desserts inspired by sweets they had experienced on a memorable vacation. Maci & Emmett won the challenge. Taanvi & Kavya were sent home.
4	"Puzzle Piece of Cake"	January 26, 2026
The teams made puzzle cakes in two parts that fit together, with each half decorated by one team member to represent their sibling's personality. Jovie & Lenore were randomly selected to have the advantage to assign all teams' cake flavors. Leia & Kiera were the winners. Abby & Cameron were sent home.
5	"Rise & Shine"	February 2, 2026
The teams were asked to make breakfast food imposters of a main dish which they randomly picked and two side dishes of their choice. In the first twist of this season, they had to add coffee as a required flavor in one item. Maci & Emmett won the challenge and were awarded stuffed toys autographed by the hosts. Leila & Melody were sent home.
6	"Cream Puff Craze"	February 9, 2026
Inspired by the recent craze for friendship bracelets, the teams made pâte à choux cream puffs arranged and decorated to resemble two bracelets. They also had to spell out a message on the puffs. In a twist, they had to pick an "adventurous" required ingredient. Genesis & Akbar won the challenge and were awarded bracelets made by the hosts. Harper & Holland were sent home.
7	"Bigs & Littles"	February 16, 2026
The teams were asked to make a pair of desserts that were conceptually cohesive. The older sibling of each team had to make a large-scale dessert, while the younger sibling had to make one dozen small desserts. The bakers were not allowed to physically help with their teammate's bake, though they could talk. Leia & Kiera were the winners. Jovie & Lenore were sent home.
8	"Hat Tricks"	February 23, 2026
In a promotion for the 2026 film The Cat in the Hat, the bakers were asked to make a dessert depicting an original animal helper character with a rhyming name. Abigail & Kenneth were the winners. Maci & Emmett were sent home.
9	"Cake to Move You"	March 2, 2026
In the final challenge, the bakers were given five hours to make zoetrope cakes, decorated with repeating shapes that appear to animate when the cake is spun around. As winners of the previous challenge, Abigail & Kenneth had the advantage to assign shapes to all teams; they chose hearts and assigned stars to Leia & Kiera and flowers to Genesis & Akbar. Abigail & Kenneth won the championship with a "Heart of the Land" themed chocolate cake with blackberry filling and hazelnuts.

== Baking Championship: Next Gen 2 ==
After the success of the first season, the second season of Baking Championship: Next Gen is set to premiere on Food Network on January 4, 2027. The series is once again hosted by Duff Goldman and Kardea Brown and follows a format similar to the previous season. It features contestants in twelve teams, this time composed of siblings, cousins, and best friends, all aged 8–14.

=== Contestants ===
Ages listed are at time of the first episode's filming.

Rank	Bakers	Relation	Location	Place
	Anka & Richard Qu	Siblings	Rochester Hills, Michigan	
	Aubrey & Ray Pierce	Siblings	Henrietta, Texas	
	Marian Lawson & Debby Olaosebikan	Best Friends	Atlanta, Georgia	
	Bella Blanco & Shelby Zigelman	Best Friends	Katy, Texas	
	Elle & John Lavelle	Siblings	Knoxville, Tennessee	
	Lane Martin & Nori Lombard	Cousins	Denver, Colorado	
	Brissa & Eden Miley	Siblings	San Antonio, Texas/Trinidad and Tobago	
	Conner Kuch & Truitt Patton	Best Friends	Conner: Bentonville, Arkansas Truitt: Fayetteville, Arkansas	
	Alessandra & Fiona Berre	Siblings	Chicago, Illinois	
	Grace & Jude Garzona	Siblings	Queen Creek, Arizona	
	Lydia & Michael Hall	Siblings	El Cerrito, California	
	Tabitha & Ramona Spencer	Siblings	Brooklyn, New York	

== Specials ==
=== Kids Halloween Baking Championship ===
A special Halloween edition aired October 5, 2016. Food Network chef Duff Goldman and actress Alison Sweeney served at the competition as judges. The contestants were four child bakers who previously competed on Kids Baking Championship.

==== Contestants ====
Contestant	Age	Hometown	Orig. season	Result
Peggy Fischer	10	St. Johnsbury, Vermont	2	WINNER
Emma Wensing	11	Austin, Texas	2	RUNNER-UP
Alex Portis	13	Monroeville, Pennsylvania	2	
Cody Vasquez	13	Gilbert, Arizona	1	

=== Seasonal specials ===
Beginning in 2019, Kids Baking Championship produced additional holiday-themed specials with returning contestants from previous seasons. In each special, the winner is awarded a prize package of baking equipment valued at $10,000.

Episodes
Title	Original release date
"Tricks and Treats"	September 26, 2019
Returning contestants: Bryn (season 4), Davey (season 5), Madison and Karthik (season 6) In this Halloween special, Duff Goldman and Valerie Bertinelli welcomed back four past contestants to make desserts with a spider web design. The twist required them to add an edible spider with a baked component. Winner: Karthik
"Kids Baking Championship: North Pole Edition"	December 8, 2019
Returning contestants: Linsey and Alex (season 4), Matthew (season 5), Nyah (season 6) Valerie, Duff, and guest judge Casey Webb challenged four returning bakers to make one dozen treats for Santa with an assigned type and flavor, along with a cookie note. The twist was to add walnuts, which the bakers had to shell. Winner: Matthew
"Season's Sweetings"	November 8, 2020
Returning contestants: Saylor from season 5, Brady and Taylor from season 7, and Naima and Sam from season 8. Hosts Duff and Valerie asked five returning kid bakers to make cakes decorated with holiday gingerbread house cutouts and including a required flavor. In a twist, they also had to bake a "reindeer treat" tasting element. Winner: Taylor
"Oh My Gourd!"	October 18, 2021
Returning contestants: Nemo, Haylin, D'Von, and Cydney, all from season 9 This Halloween special was hosted by Duff and guest judge Natasha Jiwani, the winner of season 5. The bakers were asked to make piñata cakes topped with 3D pumpkin patch decorations. In a twist, they also had to make an edible scarecrow. Winner: Nemo
"Light Up the Holidays"	November 21, 2021
Returning contestants: Avner from season 8 and Bella, Jonah, and Miabella from season 9 This holiday special was hosted by Duff and guest judge Abby Martin, finalist from season 4. The competitors were asked to bake a tsunami cake shaped like a holiday candle. The twist was to add a flame made of poured or melted sugar. Winner: Jonah
"Trick or Eat"	October 17, 2022
Returning contestants: Summer, Ava-Leigh, Santiago and Sarah from season 10 Duff and guest judge Maneet Chauhan asked the bakers to make pies topped with a Halloween mask and including two assigned ingredients. The twist was to make an edible flashlight. Winner: Summer
"Gobble Goodies"	November 13, 2022
Returning contestants: Ellora, Joseph, Benjamin, and Caroline from season 10 In this Thanksgiving special, Valerie and Duff challenged four returning kid bakers to make turkey-themed cakes. The twist required the addition of canned cranberry sauce. Winner: Joseph
"All Star Holiday Homecoming"	November 28, 2022
Returning contestants: Paige (winner of season 6), Taylor (season 7 and winner of "Season's Sweetings" special), Keaton (winner of season 9), Nemo (season 9 and winner of "Oh My Gourd!" special) Valerie and Duff challenged four past KBC winners to make a non-traditional "dazzling" yule log. The twist was to add meringue mushrooms. Winner: Keaton
"Bloodcurdling Bakes"	September 25, 2023
Returning contestants: Naiel, Peyton, Genevieve, and Jason from season 11 Duff and guest judge Samantha Seneviratne asked the returning bakers to make Halloween fault line cakes with flavor profiles inspired by candy bars. The twist was to add a fresh gravesite on top. Winner: Genevieve
"Sweets-Giving"	November 12, 2023
Returning contestants: Foster, Toby, Logan, and Sohan from season 11 Duff and guest host Kardea Brown asked the bakers to make a Thanksgiving-themed buttercream board containing two flavors of buttercream, two types of baked items, and two chocolate-dipped items. The twist was to add a half dozen shortbread cookies. Winner: Toby
"Reindeer Games"	November 27, 2023
Returning contestants: Naho, Ozan, Alissa, and Nash from season 11 In this holiday special, Duff and Kardea Brown asked the competitors to make reindeer cakes with 3D antlers and a flavor combination inspired by "reindeer food" snack mix. The twist was to make eggnog ice cream. Winner: Ozan
"Scary Good"	October 7, 2024
Returning contestants: Jaime, Levi, Madison, and Tasi from season 12 Duff and Kardea asked the bakers to make pull-apart cupcakes shaped in a Halloween design and including chili peppers as an ingredient. The twist was to add a 3D decoration. Winner: Levi
"Frosting the Snowman"	December 2, 2024
Returning contestants: Oscar, Anaiah, Camryn, and Elsie from season 12 Duff and Kardea welcomed back four kid bakers. They were given two and a half hours to bake cakes depicting a "North Pole" character (elf, gingerbread person, snowman, or penguin) wearing a knitted accessory. The twist was to add chestnuts to their cake. Winner: Camryn
