= Tabitha Brown (actress) =

American actress and internet celebrity (born 1979)

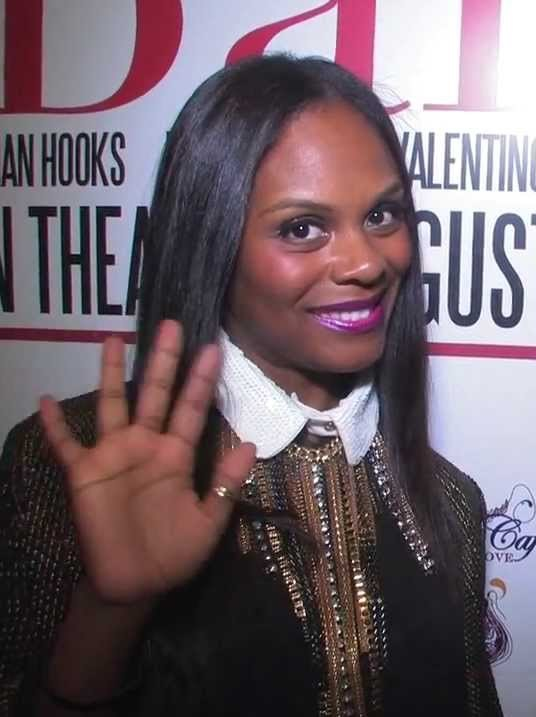
- Brown in 2013
- Born: Tabitha Bonita Thomas; February 4, 1979 (age 47); Eden, North Carolina, U.S.
- Education: Miami International University of Art & Design
- Occupations: Actress; social media personality; entrepreneur; author
- Years active: 2002–present
- Spouse: Chance Brown (m. 2003)
- Children: 2
- Website: iamtabithabrown.com

Tabitha Bonita Brown (née Thomas; born February 4, 1979) is an American actress, Emmy-winning host, chef, social media personality, entrepreneur, and author. She creates online video content incorporating veganism, humor and motivational speaking. Brown has more than 5 million followers on TikTok and more than 4.2 million followers on Instagram as of March 2023. She has been described by HuffPost as "America's Mom" and her content has been characterized by critics as being "comforting" and "calming". She is the host of the Food Network’s first plant-based cooking competition It’s CompliPlated and host of the YouTube children’s show Tab Time, for which she won a 2023 Children's and Family Emmy Award for Outstanding Host.

Born in North Carolina, Brown studied fashion briefly before leaving school to pursue acting. After developing chronic pain and fatigue, Brown switched to a vegan diet to help find relief. She created her TikTok account in 2020 and began to gain followers shortly thereafter.

Brown has appeared in television shows such as The Chi and Good Morning America. In 2021, Brown was awarded the Outstanding Social Media Personality title at the NAACP Image Awards. Her first book, Feeding the Soul (because it's my business): Finding Our Way to Joy, Love and Freedom, was published the same year, and she published her first cookbook, Cooking from the Spirit: Easy, Delicious, and Joyful Plant-Based Inspirations, the next.

== Early life and career ==
=== 1979–2007: Early years and career beginnings ===
Brown was born in Eden, North Carolina. She grew up in Stoneville. She began studying fashion design at Miami International University of Art & Design, but dropped out at age 19 and moved to Laguna Niguel, California. After struggling financially, she returned to North Carolina, this time moving to Greensboro, where she lived for five years.

In 2002, Brown got a job as the co-host of a local late-night show, where she interviewed celebrities who performed at Greensboro Coliseum Complex. In 2004, with husband in tow, she moved back to Los Angeles, where she tried stand-up comedy. After failing to land as a TV actress, Brown spent five years working at a Macy's in Century City. Six months after the move to California, Brown began traveling between North Carolina and Los Angeles to care for her mother, who had developed ALS.

=== 2008–2016: Acting and performance hiatus ===
Brown had spent three years taking care of her mother. Following her mother's death in 2007, Brown began her career acting small roles in several indie films and direct-to-video films. Brown subsequently developed chronic pain and fatigue and could not work for a year. Brown was introduced to veganism after her daughter had suggested adopting it to help with her recovery.

=== Social media breakthrough ===
In late 2017, Brown was running out of disability insurance funds, which led to her becoming an Uber driver in October 2017, in order to make ends meet as a "struggling" part-time actress. Her video review from December 2017 of a Whole Foods Market vegan BLT sandwich went viral, after which the company hired her as a brand ambassador to travel the country. In early March 2020, she created a TikTok account on which she began sharing vegan recipes, cooking tips, family moments, and encouraging advice, amassing 2 million followers in the space of five weeks. Brown had also been broadcasting live cooking shows and product reviews on Facebook live since early 2018.

=== TV and publishing ===
In late April 2020, Brown was signed to Creative Artists Agency. In late June 2020, she began hosting All Love on Ellen Digital Network. In 2021, Brown hosted the YouTube Original children's show Tab Time. The same year, she launched a hair care line named "Donna's Recipe" after her name for her afro, and she published her first book, Feeding the Soul (because it's my business): Finding Our Way to Joy, Love and Freedom, which became No. 1 on The New York Times Best Seller list. In 2022, she launched a clothing collection with Target Corporation and appeared on Good Morning America.

In 2022, William Morrow published Brown's debut cookbook Cooking from the Spirit: Easy, Delicious, and Joyful Plant-Based Inspirations. VegNews listed it as one of the "Top 100 Vegan Cookbooks of All Time" in 2024. It was featured on NPR and Good Morning America. Essence magazine reported Brown went on a two-week book tour that ended with a final appearance at the Regent Theatre in Los Angeles. Journalist Avery Yale Kamila listed Cooking from the Spirit on her list of the best vegan cookbooks of 2022. DeAnna Taylor of Ebony magazine named the book on her list of 7 cookbooks to leave Thanksgiving guests wanting more. Oprah Daily selected the book as number 8 on its 2022 list of "16 Books to Gift Your Favorite Bibliophiles". In 2023, USA Today included the book's peach cobbler recipe on a list of egg-free recipes to try as egg prices rise.

In 2022, the Food Network hired Tabitha Brown to host and executive produce the network’s first plant-based cooking competition series, It's CompliPlated. The show premiered August 11 at 10 p.m. After the show debuted, it was moved from its primetime spot to a daytime slot.

Brown's YouTube show Tab Time was nominated for two categories in the inaugural Children's and Family Emmy Awards, Outstanding Preschool Series and Outstanding Host. The following year, Brown was once again nominated for the Outstanding Host category and later won.

=== Target partnership ===
In 2022, Brown secured a deal with Target to create a line of vegan foods and kitchen items. In 2025, Target announced their decision to end several diversity, equity, and inclusion programs that had been created as a response to the murder of George Floyd. Target also announced the end of reporting to external groups such as the Human Rights Campaign's Corporate Equality Index and end a program focused on carrying more products from Black- or minority-owned businesses. Brown faced backlash for her statements on Instagram urging the public not to boycott the company due to the effect a boycott could cause on her sales and other minority-owned businesses that also sell their products at Target.

== Personal life ==
Brown is married to Chance Brown, a retired LAPD officer with whom she co-hosts Fridays with Tab & Chance on IGTV. Together, they have two children; Choyce and Queston. She also has a step-daughter, Tyleah, from her husband's previous relationship. The family resides in Los Angeles, California.

== Books ==
- Feeding the Soul (because it's my business): Finding Our Way to Joy, Love and Freedom
- Cooking from the Spirit: Easy, Delicious, and Joyful Plant-Based Inspirations

== Filmography ==
Adapted from IMDb:

=== Film ===
As Writer

Year	Title	Writer	Notes
2019	Love or Laughs	Yes	Co-written with Bo Starks

As Actress

Year	Title	Role	Director	Notes
2005	Bad Reputation	High School Student / Partygoer	Jim Hemphill	
2008	Outrighteous	Simone	Jill Maxcy	
2009	Thug Love	CeCe	Marcello Thedford	
2010	Helpless	Tabitha Johnson	Brent Huff	Short film
2010	Caution to the Wind	Veronica Paige	Douglas Herman	
2012	Laughing to the Bank	Various	Brian Hooks	
2017	I Am Still Here	Alicia	Mischa Marcus	
2018	All Between Us	Aubyrn	Jamie Jones	
2018	I Hate LA	Roxie	Reuben Johnson	
2018	A Stone Cold Christmas	Homeless Santa	Courtney Miller	
2019	Princess of the Row	Aunty Tammy	Max Carlson	
2025	Unexpected Christmas		Post-production	

=== Television ===
Year	Title	Role	Notes
2011	Lbs	Sabrina Wright	3 episodes
2013	Fat Ass Anonymous	Sabrina	Pilot episode
2014	Black Boots	Dr. Freeman	Episode: "Revolutions"
2015	Family Time	Dr. Darlene	Episode: "What's Ours is Mine"
2015, 2019	Black Jesus	Theresa / Teresa	2 episodes
2016	Sex Sent Me to the ER	Dr. Mary Manson	Episode: "Bedroom Eyes"
2017	The Ellen DeGeneres Show	Lorraine	Episode: "Felicity Huffman/Lea Michele/Stephen 'tWitch' Boss"
2017	Switched at Birth	Nurse Reed	Episode: "Four Ages in Life"
2017	CH Originals	Aunt Tiffany	Episode: "Disarming Conversational Land Mines"
2018	Vengeful	Dr. Darcel Anderson-Ramirez	Pilot episode
2020	Will & Grace	Female Officer	Episode: "What A Dump"
2020	Anatomy of Black Love	Self	TV documentary
2020	The Talk	Self	Episode: "Joel McHale/Tabitha Brown"
2021	The Chi	Octavia Matthews	5 episodes
2022	Tab Time	Miss Tab	
2022	The Tiny Chef Show	Herself	2 episodes

== Awards and nominations ==
Award	Year	Category	Recipient(s) and nominee(s)	Result	Ref.
Veggie Awards	2020	Favorite Vegan Social Media Personality	Herself	Won	
Streamy Awards	2020	Food	Herself	Won	
NAACP Image Awards	2021	Outstanding Social Media Personality	Herself	Won	
NAACP Image Awards	2026	Outstanding Breakthrough Performance in a Motion Picture	Unexpected Christmas	Nominated	
Children's and Family Emmy Awards	2022	Outstanding Preschool Series	Tab Time	Nominated	
Children's and Family Emmy Awards	2022	Outstanding Host	Tab Time	Nominated	
Children's and Family Emmy Awards	2023	Outstanding Host	Tab Time	Won	
Children's and Family Emmy Awards	2026	Outstanding Children's Personality	Tab Time	Won	
Children's and Family Emmy Awards	2026	Outstanding Preschool, Children's or Family Viewing Series	Tab Time	Nominated	
Children's and Family Emmy Awards	2026	Outstanding Writing for a Preschool or Children's Series	Tab Time	Won	
Give Her FlowHERS Awards	2022	The Self-Love Award	Herself	Honored	

== See also ==
- List of vegan and plant-based media
