= Children's and Family Emmy Award for Outstanding Children's Personality =

Award for hosting in a children's television series

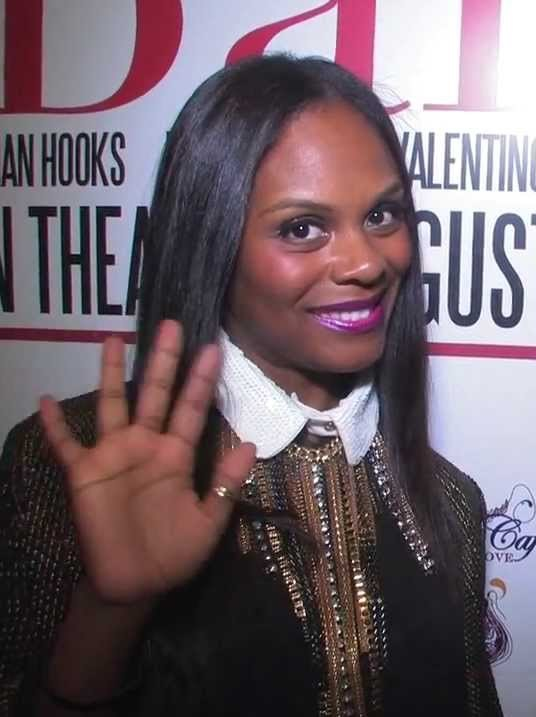
- The 2025 recipient: Tabitha Brown
- Awarded for: Outstanding Hosting
- Country: United States
- Presented by: Academy of Television Arts & Sciences
- First award: 2022
- Currently held by: Tabitha Brown, Tab Time, (2025)
- Website: theemmys.tv/childrens/

The Children's and Family Emmy Award for Outstanding Children's Personality was established at the 1st Children's and Family Emmy Awards in 2022 under the name Outstanding Host, and is open to performers of all genders. The current holder of the award is Tabitha Brown, who won at the 4th Children's and Family Emmy Awards for Tab Time. The category received its current name at the 3rd Children's and Family Emmy Awards.

== Background ==
On November 17, 2021, the NATAS announced the creation of the Children's and Family Emmy Awards to recognize the best in children's and family television. The organization cited an "explosive growth in the quantity and quality of children’s and family programming" as justification for a dedicated ceremony. Many categories of the awards were previously presented at the Daytime Emmy Awards. While both the Daytime and Primetime Emmy Awards have honored hosting with various categories, there has never been an award specifically dedicated to hosting in children's programming until the establishment of this category.

== Winners and nominations ==
=== Outstanding Host ===
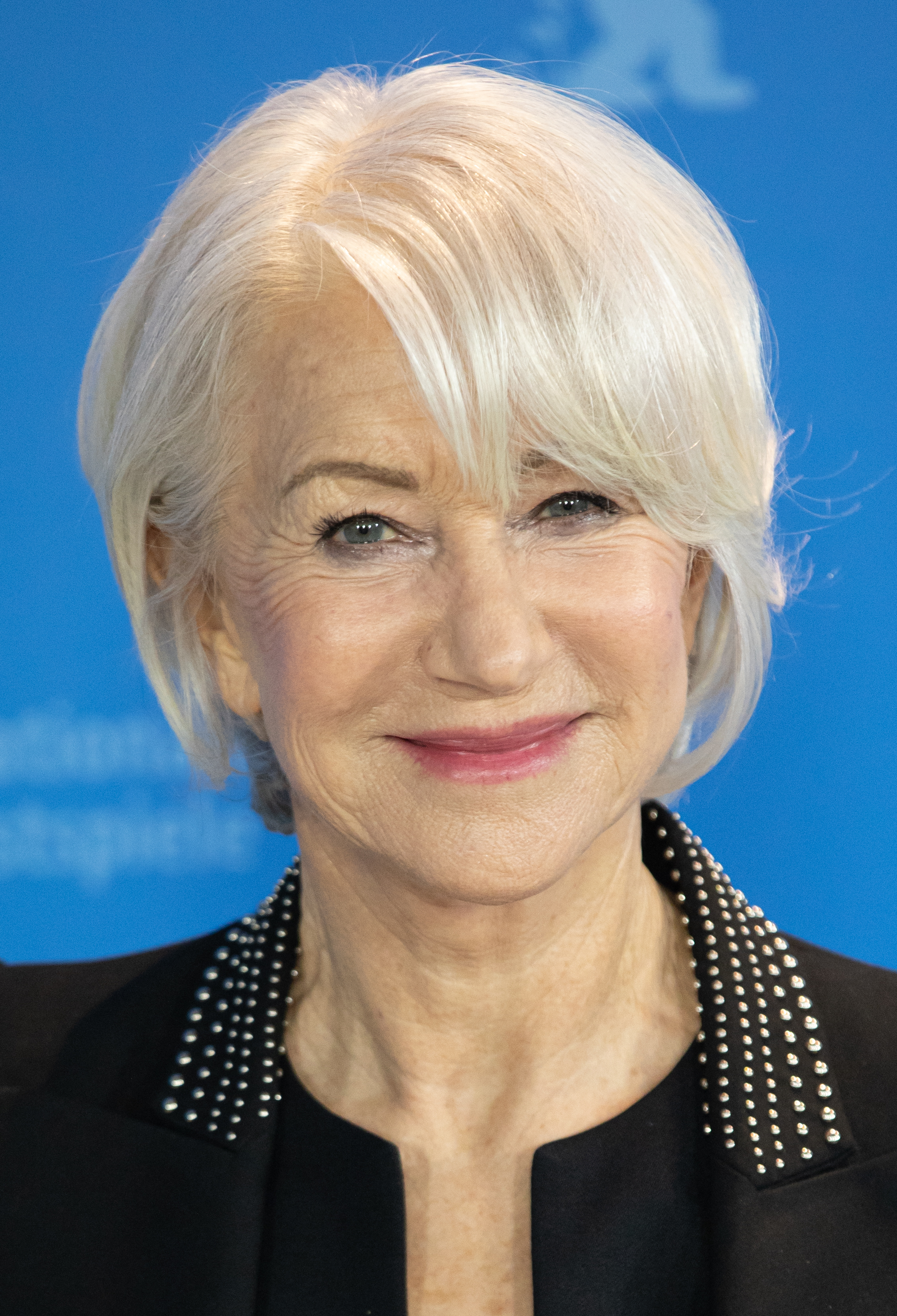
Inaugural recipient Helen Mirren.

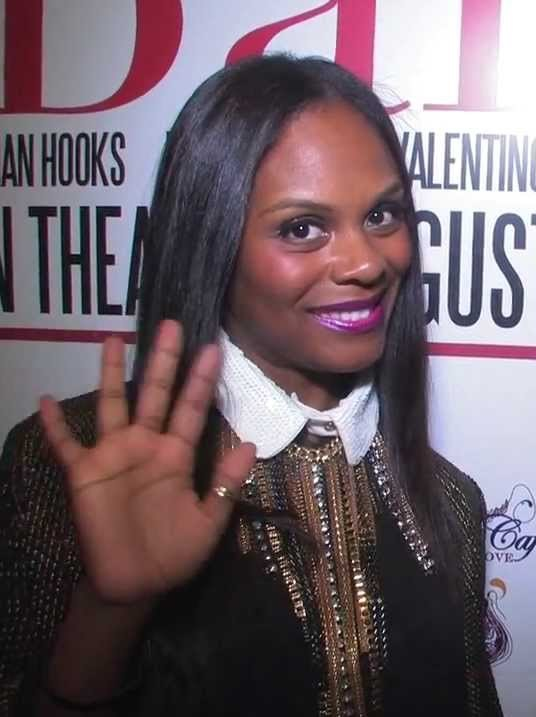
2023 & 2025 winner Tabitha Brown.

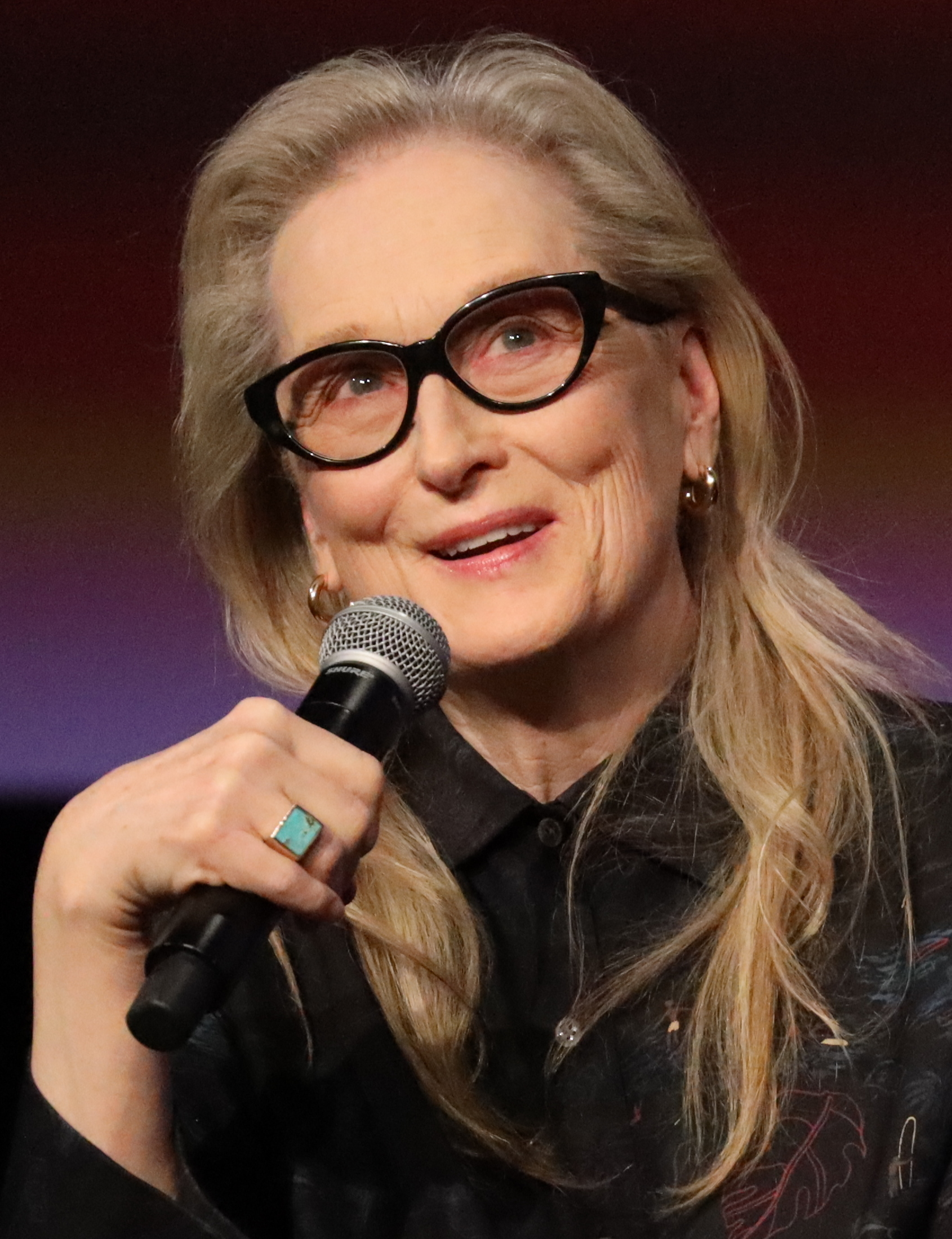
2024 winner Meryl Streep.

| Year | Host | Program | Network | Refs |
|---|---|---|---|---|
2022 (1st)
| 2022 (1st) | Helen Mirren | Harry Potter: Hogwarts Tournament of Houses | Cartoon Network/TBS | |
| 2022 (1st) | Tabitha Brown | Tab Time | YouTube Originals | |
| 2022 (1st) | Recker Eans, Dylan Gilmer, Mykal-Michelle Harris, Olivia Perez | The Kids Tonight Show | Peacock | |
| 2022 (1st) | Jack McBrayer | Hello Jack! The Kindness Show | Apple TV+ | |
| 2022 (1st) | Coyote Peterson | Coyote Peterson's Wild Field Trip | YouTube Originals | |
2023 (2nd)
| 2023 (2nd) | Tabitha Brown | Tab Time | YouTube Originals | |
| 2023 (2nd) | Valerie Bertinelli and Duff Goldman | Kids Baking Championship | Food Network | |
| 2023 (2nd) | Emmanuel Carter | Noggin Knows | Noggin | |
| 2023 (2nd) | Taylor Cassidy, Benjamin De Almeida, Kahlil Greene, Tejas Hullur, Jane McManus & Jillian Smith | Nick News | Nickelodeon | |
| 2023 (2nd) | Juanpa Zurita | Elmo's Mindfulness Spectacular | YouTube | |

=== Outstanding Children's Personality ===
| Year | Host | Program | Network | Refs |
|---|---|---|---|---|
2024 (3rd)
| 2024 (3rd) | Meryl Streep | Storyline Online: The Three Questions | StorylineOnline.net | |
| 2024 (3rd) | Awkwafina | A Real Bug's Life | National Geographic | |
| 2024 (3rd) | Gavin Friday | Peter and the Wolf | Max | |
| 2024 (3rd) | Duff Goldman | Kids Baking Championship | Food Network | |
| 2024 (3rd) | Ian McShane | One Piece | Netflix | |
2025 (4th)
| 2025 (4th) | Tabitha Brown | Tab Time | YouTube | |
| 2025 (4th) | Yvette Nicole Brown | Cookie Monster's Bake Sale: Block Party | HBO Max | |
| 2025 (4th) | Perdita Felicien | All-Round Champion | BYUtv | |
| 2025 (4th) | Alia Pope | Chip Kids | East Tennessee PBS | |
| 2025 (4th) | June Squibb | Storyline Online | YouTube | |

== Individuals with multiple wins ==
2 wins

- Tabitha Brown

== Individuals with multiple nominations ==
3 nominations

- Tabitha Brown

2 nominations

- Duff Goldman

== Programs with multiple nominations ==
3 nominations

- Tab Time

2 nominations

- Kids Baking Championship

== Networks with multiple nominations ==
6 nominations

- YouTube/YouTube Originals

2 nominations

- Food Network

== Superlatives ==
| Superlative | Performer | Program | Year | Age |
|---|---|---|---|---|
| Oldest Nominee | Helen Mirren | Harry Potter: Hogwarts Tournament of Houses | 2022 | 77 |
| Youngest Nominee | Mykal-Michelle Harris | The Kids Tonight Show | 2022 | 10 |
