= List of Tyler Perry's Young Dylan episodes =

Tyler Perry's Young Dylan is an American comedy television series created by Tyler Perry that aired on Nickelodeon from February 29, 2020 to April 30, 2025. The series stars Dylan Gilmer, Celina Smith, Hero Hunter, Jet Miller, Mieko Hillman, Aloma Lesley Wright, and Carl Anthony Payne, II.

== Series overview ==
| Season | Episodes | Originally released | |
| Season | Episodes | First released | Last released |
|---|---|---|---|
| 1 | 14 | February 29, 2020 | October 3, 2020 |
| 2 | 20 | June 12, 2021 | December 9, 2021 |
| 3 | 19 | June 19, 2022 | April 13, 2023 |
| 4 | 19 | September 6, 2023 | January 10, 2024 |
| 5 | 13 | December 18, 2024 | April 30, 2025 |

== Episodes ==
=== Season 1 (2020) ===
| No. overall | No. in season | Title | Directed by | Written by | Original release date | Prod. code | U.S. viewers (millions) |
|---|---|---|---|---|---|---|---|
| 1 | 1 | "Imaginary Friends" | Tyler Perry | Tyler Perry | February 29, 2020 | 101 | 0.63 |
Absent: Jet Miller as Bethany
| 2 | 2 | "Street Smart" | Tyler Perry and Chip Hurd | Tyler Perry | March 7, 2020 | 103 | 0.59 |
Guest stars: Khaled "DJ Khaled" Khaled, Tristan Lee Griffin as Zuri
| 3 | 3 | "Chasing That Dream" | Chip Hurd | Tyler Perry | March 14, 2020 | 104 | 0.63 |
Absent: Jet Miller as Bethany
| 4 | 4 | "Plain Faces" | Tyler Perry and Kim Fields | Tyler Perry | March 21, 2020 | 105 | 0.79 |
Guest star: Rodney Hobbs as Principal Matthews Absent: Aloma Lesley Wright as Viola
| 5 | 5 | "The Enforcer" | Tyler Perry and Kim Fields | Tyler Perry | March 28, 2020 | 106 | 0.61 |
Guest stars: Rodney Hobbs as Principal Matthews, Julie Dove as Ms. Mills, Ryder Duncan as Christian, Mila Harris as Abigail
| 6 | 6 | "Speechless" | Chip Hurd | Tyler Perry | June 13, 2020 | 102 | 0.40 |
Guest stars: David Shae as Phillipe, Ashley LeConte Campbell as Mrs. Whitaker Absent: Jet Miller as Bethany, Aloma Lesley Wright as Viola
| 7 | 7 | "Flowers" | Kim Fields | Tyler Perry | June 20, 2020 | 107 | 0.35 |
Guest stars: Tristan Lee Griffin as Zuri, Olivia Laine Welch as Female Student Absent: Aloma Lesley Wright as Viola
| 8 | 8 | "In Too Deep" | Kim Fields | Tyler Perry | June 27, 2020 | 108 | 0.49 |
| 9 | 9 | "Mother May I" | Chip Hurd | Tyler Perry | July 11, 2020 | 109 | 0.37 |
Absent: Jet Miller as Bethany, Aloma Lesley Wright as Viola
| 10 | 10 | "Teachable Moments" | Chip Hurd | Tyler Perry | July 18, 2020 | 110 | 0.54 |
Guest stars: Rodney Hobbs as Principal Matthews, Tatum Shank as Mr. Callow, Kimberly Ann Klasnic as Parent #1, Pacey Liz Walker as Parent #2, Rakesh Gosain as Parent #3, April Powell as Announcer (V.O.) Absent: Aloma Lesley Wright as Viola
| 11 | 11 | "Natural Beauty" | Kim Fields | Tyler Perry | July 25, 2020 | 111 | 0.40 |
Guest stars: Rodney Hobbs as Principal Matthews, Tristan Lee Griffin as Zuri, Lauren Buglioli as Ms. Holt Absent: Aloma Lesley Wright as Viola
| 12 | 12 | "Special Delivery" | Chip Hurd | Tyler Perry | September 19, 2020 | 112 | 0.46 |
Guest star: Anthony E. Williams as Romeo Absent: Jet Miller as Bethany, Aloma Lesley Wright as Viola
| 13 | 13 | "The Rap Game" | Chip Hurd | Tyler Perry | September 26, 2020 | 113 | 0.45 |
Absent: Jet Miller as Bethany, Aloma Lesley Wright as Viola
| 14 | 14 | "The Gift" | Chip Hurd | Tyler Perry | October 3, 2020 | 114 | 0.40 |
Guest star: Nadége August as Darlene Absent: Jet Miller as Bethany

=== Season 2 (2021) ===
| No. overall | No. in season | Title | Directed by | Written by | Original release date | Prod. code | U.S. viewers (millions) |
|---|---|---|---|---|---|---|---|
| 15 | 1 | "Food for the Soul" | Chip Hurd | Mark E. Swinton | June 12, 2021 | 201 | 0.30 |
Guest star: Nadége August as Darlene Absent: Jet Miller as Bethany
| 16 | 2 | "My Fair Charlie" | Chip Hurd | Angela Yarbrough | June 19, 2021 | 202 | 0.33 |
Guest stars: Rodney J. Hobbs as Principal Matthews, Riley Cooper as Staci, Brian Bremer as Albert V.O., Cara Reid as Florence V.O. Absent: Jet Miller as Bethany
| 17 | 3 | "A Tale of Two Rappers" | Chip Hurd | James III | June 26, 2021 | 203 | 0.38 |
Guest stars: Samuel Goergen as Booder, Rowan Bousaid as Mr. Elliot Absent: Aloma Lesley Wright as Viola
| 18 | 4 | "Einsteins" | Carl Anthony Payne, II | Shamar Michael Curry | July 3, 2021 | 204 | 0.32 |
Guest stars: Samuel Goergen as Booder, Rowan Bousaid as Mr. Elliot, Kelly Tippens as Tiffany, Omer Mughal as Derrick, Brock Duncan as Harkley, Brayden Scott as Sammy Absent: Aloma Lesley Wright as Viola
| 19 | 5 | "Who Done Done It?" | Chip Hurd | Arthur Harris | July 10, 2021 | 205 | 0.32 |
Guest star: Samuel Goergen as Booder Absent: Aloma Lesley Wright as Viola
| 20 | 6 | "Partners in Rhyme" | Carl Anthony Payne, II | Scott Taylor & Wesley Jermaine Johnson | July 17, 2021 | 209 | 0.25 |
Guest star: Margo McKenna as Operator (V.O.) Absent: Aloma Lesley Wright as Viola
| 21 | 7 | "Coppin' Magnitudes" | Chip Hurd | Shamar Michael Curry | August 7, 2021 | 206 | 0.36 |
Guest star: Christopher L. Morgan as Ghost
| 22 | 8 | "Oceans 11am" | Chip Hurd | Scott Taylor & Wesley Jermaine Johnson | August 14, 2021 | 207 | 0.33 |
Guest stars: Samuel Goergen as Booder, Rodney J. Hobbs as Principal Matthews Absent: Jet Miller as Bethany, Aloma Lesley Wright as Viola
| 23 | 9 | "Cruisin' for a Bruisin'" | Chip Hurd | James III | August 21, 2021 | 208 | 0.33 |
| 24 | 10 | "Squirrel Scouts and Seaweed Masks" | Derrick Doose | Freddie Gutierrez | September 23, 2021 | 210 | 0.35 |
Absent: Jet Miller as Bethany
| 25 | 11 | "Charlie the Bad Boy" | Chip Hurd | Angela Yarbrough | September 30, 2021 | 211 | 0.29 |
Guest stars: Rodney J. Hobbs as Principal Matthews, Cade Tropeano as Kid #1, Maurice G. Smith as Coach Harris, Ellie Ann Hendrickson as Blade, Manny Magnus as Mace, Noah Maxwell Thigpen as Tracey Absent: Aloma Lesley Wright as Viola
| 26 | 12 | "Dylan and Rebecca vs. Alcatraz" | Chip Hurd | Freddie Guttierez | October 7, 2021 | 212 | 0.26 |
| 27 | 13 | "So Many Lessons" | Chip Hurd | Mark E. Swinton | October 14, 2021 | 213 | 0.33 |
Guest stars: Samuel Goergen as Booder, Rowan Bousaid as Mr. Elliot, Ryder Duncan as Christian, Herode Ettienne Jr. as Marcus
| 28 | 14 | "Haunted Halls" | Chip Hurd | Shamar Michael Curry | October 21, 2021 | 214 | 0.29 |
Guest stars: Rodney J. Hobbs as Principal Matthews, Samuel Goergen as Booder, Adam Laborde as Janitor Bailey, Michael Brady as Sean
| 29 | 15 | "Dylan vs. Mystery X" | Chip Hurd | Freddie Guttierez | October 28, 2021 | 215 | 0.24 |
Guest stars: Samuel Goergen as Booder, Abby Park as Keilan, Ryder Duncan as Christian, Colbert Bernard as Mystery X (V.O.) Absent: Jet Miller as Bethany
| 30 | 16 | "Bunk Hate" | Chip Hurd | Shamar Michael Curry | November 4, 2021 | 216 | 0.28 |
Absent: Aloma Lesley Wright as Viola
| 31 | 17 | "Snitches Get Stitches" | Chip Hurd | Mark E. Swinton | November 18, 2021 | 217 | 0.36 |
Guest stars: Rodney J. Hobbs as Principal Matthews, Tyler Richardson as Nick, Ryder Duncan as Christian Absent: Jet Miller as Bethany
| 32 | 18 | "Taking Credit" | Chip Hurd | Angela Yarbrough | November 25, 2021 | 218 | 0.33 |
Guest stars: Ryder Duncan as Christian, Marcus Hopkins-Turner as Repo Guy, Tre'Mond Kearse as Announcer (V.O.) Absent: Aloma Lesley Wright as Viola
| 33 | 19 | "Waiting for Santa" | Chip Hurd | Joe Sullivan | December 2, 2021 | 220 | 0.35 |
Guest stars: Gerard Catus as Santa G, Chip Hurd as Toya the Phantom Pig (V.O.) Absent: Jet Miller as Bethany
| 34 | 20 | "Rap Dreams Do Come True" | Chip Hurd | Scott Taylor & Wesley Jermaine Johnson | December 9, 2021 | 219 | 0.28 |
Guest stars: Chance the Rapper as himself, Samuel Goergen as Booder, Chad Farley as Mr. Battle Absent: Jet Miller as Bethany

=== Season 3 (2022–23) ===
| No. overall | No. in season | Title | Directed by | Written by | Original release date | Prod. code | U.S. viewers (millions) |
|---|---|---|---|---|---|---|---|
| 35 | 1 | "Friday the Juneteenth" | Chip Hurd | Kourtney Richard | June 19, 2022 | 309 | 0.26 |
Guest star: Rodney J. Hobbs as Principal Matthews
| 36 | 2 | "How to Catch a Scammer" | Chip Hurd | Angel Hobbs | July 21, 2022 | 303 | 0.16 |
Guest star: That Girl Lay Lay as Lay Lay, Marc Levasseur as Mr. Pallazini, Zachary Martinez as Benny
| 37 | 3 | "Dylan Blows Up" | Chip Hurd | Scott Taylor & Wesley Jermaine Johnson | July 28, 2022 | 301 | 0.12 |
Guest star: Rowan Bousaid as Mr. Elliot
| 38 | 4 | "Dylan & Charlie's Day Off" | Chip Hurd | Shamar Michael Curry | August 4, 2022 | 302 | 0.22 |
Guest stars: Samuel Goergen as Booder, Rowan Bousaid as Mr. Elliot, Ryder Duncan as Christian
| 39 | 5 | "The Gift Grift" | Chip Hurd | Freddie Gutierrez | September 15, 2022 | 304 | 0.21 |
Guest star: Rowan Bousaid as Mr. Elliot
| 40 | 6 | "Power Trippin'" | Chip Hurd | Freddie Gutierrez | September 22, 2022 | 305 | 0.21 |
Guest stars: Rodney J. Hobbs as Principal Matthews, Samuel Goergen as Booder, Ryder Duncan as Christian, Poppy Gillett as Lisa
| 41 | 7 | "Fame, Blame & Video Games" | Chip Hurd | Angel Hobbs | September 29, 2022 | 306 | 0.19 |
Guest stars: Samuel Goergen as Booder, Rowan Bousad as Mr. Elliot,
| 42 | 8 | "Saturday School" | Chip Hurd | Shamar Michael Curry | October 13, 2022 | 307 | 0.26 |
Guest stars: Rowen Bousaid as Mr. Elliot, Ryder Duncan as Christian
| 43 | 9 | "On the Hunt for Fun" | Chip Hurd | Freddie Gutierrez | October 20, 2022 | 308 | 0.15 |
| 44 | 10 | "The Chi Ones" | Chip Hurd | Scott Taylor & Wesley Jermaine Johnson | October 27, 2022 | 310 | 0.18 |
Guest stars: Griffin Harris as Lil C, Sydney Johnson as Ona, Shaun Dixon as Tone
| 45 | 11 | "Renaissance Man" | Chip Hurd | Mark E. Swinton | February 16, 2023 | 319 | 0.18 |
Guest stars: Rodney J. Hobbs as Principal Matthews, Rowan Bousaid as Mr. Elliot, Ryder Duncan as Christian
| 46 | 12 | "Reality Bites" | Carl Anthony Payne, II | Korama Danquah | February 23, 2023 | 311 | 0.13 |
| 47 | 13 | "A Corsage with Your Sabotage" | Carl Anthony Payne, II | Freddie Gutierrez | March 2, 2023 | 312 | 0.16 |
Guest stars: Rodney J. Hobbs as Principal Matthews, Max Ivutin as Corey, Sofia Sorano Xavier as Tara, Josh L. Smith as Vice Principal Clark (V.O.)
| 48 | 14 | "Curse this Verse" | Carl Anthony Payne, II | Arthur Harris & Chris Moore | March 9, 2023 | 313 | 0.15 |
Guest star: Samuel Goergen as Booder
| 49 | 15 | "Principal Party Pooper" | Carl Anthony Payne, II | Desia Gore | March 16, 2023 | 314 | 0.20 |
Guest star: Rodney J. Hobbs as Principal Matthews
| 50 | 16 | "Burning After Reading" | Jeneffa Soldatic | Scott Taylor & Wesley Jermaine Johnson | March 23, 2023 | 315 | 0.17 |
Guest stars: Samuel Goergen as Booder, Maurice G. Smith as Coach Harris, Tony Vo as Tim Fencing Stunt
| 51 | 17 | "Who's the Boss" | Carl Anthony Payne, II | Desia Gore | March 30, 2023 | 316 | 0.15 |
Guest stars: Rodney J. Hobbs as Principal Matthews, Ryder Duncan as Christian, Poppy Gillett as Lisa, Brisco De Paolo as Murphy, Mikayla Rousseau as Tracee, Anela Terzic as Science Teacher
| 52 | 18 | "The GOAT" | Chip Hurd | Mark E. Swinton | April 6, 2023 | 317 | 0.15 |
Guest star: Theory Aspyn-Sky Gray as Carla
| 53 | 19 | "Between a Roach and a Hard Place" | Carl Anthony Payne, II | Scott Taylor & Wesley Jermaine Johnson | April 13, 2023 | 320 | 0.16 |
Guest star: Karen Ceesay as Maya Marcel

=== Season 4 (2023–24) ===
| No. overall | No. in season | Title | Directed by | Written by | Original release date | Prod. code | U.S. viewers (millions) |
|---|---|---|---|---|---|---|---|
| 54 | 1 | "Build It and They Will Flow" | Chip Hurd | Scott Taylor & Wesley Jermaine Johnson | September 6, 2023 | 401 | 0.09 |
| 55 | 2 | "Dylan's Villain" | Chip Hurd | Shamar Michael Curry | September 13, 2023 | 318 | 0.11 |
| 56 | 3 | "No Camping, No Problem" | Chip Hurd | Rose V. Ashikyan | September 20, 2023 | 403 | 0.10 |
| 57 | 4 | "Wilson vs. Wilson" | Jeneffa Soldatic | Jai Joseph | September 27, 2023 | 404 | 0.10 |
| 58 | 5 | "Artificial Intelligence" | Jeneffa Soldatic | Kourtney Richard | October 4, 2023 | 405 | 0.14 |
| 59 | 6 | "So Fresh, So Clean" | Chip Hurd | Scott Taylor & Wesley Jermaine Johnson | October 11, 2023 | 406 | 0.11 |
| 60 | 7 | "Dancing with the Sons" | Chip Hurd | Laura House | October 18, 2023 | 407 | N/A |
| 61 | 8 | "The Wilson Family" | Chip Hurd | Mark E. Swinton | October 25, 2023 | 415 | N/A |
| 62 | 9 | "Best Friends For-Never" | Carl Anthony Payne, II | Joe Sullivan | November 1, 2023 | 408 | N/A |
| 63 | 10 | "Picture Perfect" | Chip Hurd | Kourtney Richard | November 8, 2023 | 409 | 0.09 |
| 64 | 11 | "Deliver Us From Viola" | Chip Hurd | Shamar Michael Curry | November 15, 2023 | 410 | 0.15 |
| 65 | 12 | "Hot Takes" | Carl Anthony Payne, II | Scott Taylor & Wesley Jermaine Johnson | November 22, 2023 | 412 | N/A |
| 66 | 13 | "Model Behavior" | Derrick Doose | Angela Yarbrough | November 29, 2023 | 411 | 0.10 |
| 67 | 14 | "Boyz to Men" | Derrick Doose | Shamar Michael Curry | December 6, 2023 | 413 | N/A |
| 68 | 15 | "What's Poppin'" | Derrick Doose | Angel Hobbs | December 13, 2023 | 414 | 0.12 |
| 69 | 16 | "A Very Delivery Van Christmas" | Chip Hurd | Joe Sullivan | December 20, 2023 | 402 | 0.11 |
| 70 | 17 | "Sleepover Showdown" | Aloma Lesley Wright | Freddie Gutierrez | December 27, 2023 | 416 | 0.09 |
| 71 | 18 | "Mo Viral, Mo Problems" | Colbert Bernard | Angel Hobbs | January 3, 2024 | 417 | 0.11 |
| 72 | 19 | "Rhyme It and They Will Come" | Derrick Doose | Scott Taylor & Wesley Jermaine Johnson | January 10, 2024 | 418 | N/A |

=== Season 5 (2024–25) ===
| No. overall | No. in season | Title | Directed by | Written by | Original release date | Prod. code | U.S. viewers (millions) |
|---|---|---|---|---|---|---|---|
| 73 | 1 | "The Wrap Battle" | Chip Hurd | Joe Sullivan | December 18, 2024 | 501 | N/A |
| 74 | 2 | "Red Tails" | Chip Hurd | Scott Taylor & Wesley Jermaine Johnson | February 26, 2025 | 513 | N/A |
| 75 | 3 | "Sharing Is Caring" | Chip Hurd | Scott Taylor & Wesley Jermaine Johnson | March 5, 2025 | 502 | N/A |
| 76 | 4 | "Yours, Mine, and Also Mine" | Chip Hurd | Michael Cadwallader | March 12, 2025 | 503 | N/A |
| 77 | 5 | "Really Young Nova" | Chip Hurd | Dicky Murphy | March 19, 2025 | 504 | N/A |
| 78 | 6 | "Trippin'" | Aloma Wright | Laura House | March 26, 2025 | 506 | N/A |
| 79 | 7 | "The New Kid" | Jeneffa Soldatic | Hannah Suria | April 2, 2025 | TBA | N/A |
| 80 | 8 | "Star-Crossed Lockers" | Chip Hurd | Joe Sullivan | April 9, 2025 | 508 | N/A |
| 81 | 9 | "Keep It on the DL" | Chip Hurd | Shamar Michael Curry | April 16, 2025 | 509 | N/A |
| 82 | 10 | "Betting on Booder" | Colbert Bernard | Freddie Gutierrez | April 23, 2025 | 505 | N/A |
| 83 | 11 | "Crush Groove" | Chip Hurd | Laura House | April 23, 2025 | 512 | N/A |
| 84 | 12 | "Dream Team" | Chip Hurd | Shamar Michael Curry | April 30, 2025 | 510 | N/A |
| 85 | 13 | "Funcle" | Carl Anthony Payne, II | Freddie Gutierrez | April 30, 2025 | 511 | N/A |
