= Dylan Gilmer =

American singer, rapper and actor

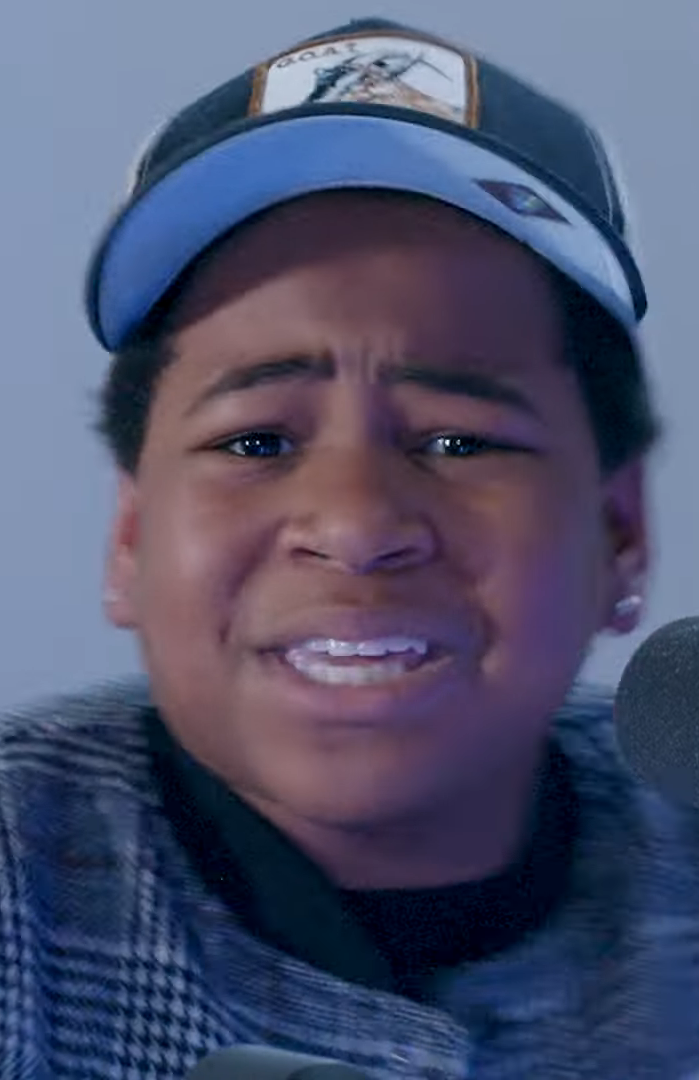
- Dylan in 2022
- Born: March 4, 2009 (age 17); Annapolis, Maryland, U.S.
- Other name: Young Dylan
- Occupations: Rapper, actor, television host
- Years active: 2015–present
- Known for: Tyler Perry's Young Dylan, NFL Slimetime
- Parent(s): Damon Gilmer (father); Deaundra Gilmer (mother)

Dylan Gilmer (born March 4, 2009), known professionally as Young Dylan, is an American actor, rapper, and television host. He rose to prominence after his rap videos went viral when he was six years old, and he has since appeared on The Ellen DeGeneres Show, performed at NBA All‑Star Weekend, and starred in the Nickelodeon sitcom Tyler Perry's Young Dylan (2020–2025).

== Early life ==
Dylan Gilmer was born and raised in Annapolis, Maryland, to parents Damon and Deaundra Gilmer. He developed an early interest in music and grew up listening to Drake. At age 6, his parents posted a home video of him rapping Bryson Tiller's "Don't", which went viral.

== Career ==
=== Viral sensation & early media appearances ===
He first gained national attention after appearing on The Ellen DeGeneres Show multiple times, and performing during the NBA All‑Star Celebrity Game halftime shows. In 2019, at age ten, he competed on Season 14 of America's Got Talent and advanced to the Judge Cuts, though he was eliminated before the quarterfinals.

=== Tyler Perry's Young Dylan (2020–2025) ===
In 2020, Dylan was cast by Tyler Perry to star as a fictionalized version of himself in the Nickelodeon sitcom Tyler Perry's Young Dylan, which aired from February 29, 2020, through April 30, 2025, for five seasons and 85 episodes.

Dylan has recorded and released original music, including singles like "Tik Tok" and "Get Litty", and has made frequent appearances on children‑oriented television, including hosting NFL Slimetime and co‑hosting Peacock’s The Kids Tonight Show in 2021.

== Filmography ==
Year	Title	Role	Notes
2019	America's Got Talent	Himself	Participant
2019	The Ellen DeGeneres Show	Himself	Guest
2020	All That	Himself	Episode; "Episode 1118" Musical guest
2020	Tyler Perry's Young Dylan	Young Dylan / Dylon	Lead role
2021	NFL Slimetime	Himself	Host
2021	The Tonight Show Starring Jimmy Fallon	Himself	Guest; episode 1531
2021	The Kids Tonight Show	Himself	Host
2022	Side Hustle	Young Dylan	Episode; "When Worlds Collide"
2022	That Girl Lay Lay	Young Dylan	Episode; "Dylan and Rebecca's Cleve-Land-Land Adventure"
2022	Play-Doh Squished	Himself	Episode; "Planes, Trains, Cars"
2023	The Jennifer Hudson Show	Himself	Episode; "Episode 105" Guest
2023	Nickelodeon Kids' Choice Awards 2023	Himself	Musical performer
2023	The Tiny Chef Show	Himself	Guest star
2025	Elio	Bryce	

== Discography ==
- Tik Tok (2022)
- Get Litty (2023)
- I Just Wanna (2023)
- Bet It (2024)

== Awards ==
Year	Award	Category	Nominee(s)	Result	Refs.
2021	Kids' Choice Awards	Favorite Male TV Star	Dylan Gilmer	Nominated	
2022	Kids' Choice Awards	Favorite Male TV Star (Kids)	Young Dylan	Nominated	
2023	Kids' Choice Awards	Favorite Male TV Star (Kids)	Young Dylan	Nominated	
