= Unexpected Christmas =

American Christmas film

- Theatrical release poster
- Directed by: Michael Vaughn Hernandez
- Screenplay by: Cassandra Mann
- Produced by: Trell Woodberry; Phil Thornton; Perri Camper
- Starring: Tabitha Brown; Lil Rel Howery; Anna Maria Horsford; DomiNque Perry; Reagan Gomez-Preston
- Cinematography: Rachael Owen Hastings
- Edited by: Kally Khourshid
- Music by: Eric Hall
- Production company: 3 Diamonds Entertainment
- Distributed by: 3 Diamonds Entertainment Eammon Films
- Release date: November 7, 2025
- Running time: 104 minutes
- Country: United States
- Language: English

Unexpected Christmas is a 2025 American Christmas romantic comedy film starring Lil Rel Howery and Tabitha Brown. It was released on November 7, 2025.

== Premise ==
Surprise guests threaten to derail a family reunion at Christmas.

== Cast ==
- Tabitha Brown as Debbie
- Lil Rel Howery as Richard
- Anna Maria Horsford as Momma Scott
- DomiNque Perry as Marissa
- Reagan Gomez-Preston as Kerry
- Terrence Terrell as Michael
- Trell Woodberry as Kyle
- Howie Bell as Earl
- Cecelia Friday as Alicia
- Ricco Ross as Willie
- Koryn Hawthorne as Imani

== Production ==
The film is written by Cassandra Mann and directed by Michael Vaughn Hernandez. It is produced by 3 Diamonds Entertainment's Trell Woodberry and Phil Thornton, as well as Perri Camper. Lil Rel Howery and Tabitha Brown are executive producers and also lead the cast.

The cast also includes Anna Maria Horsford, DomiNque Perry, Reagan Gomez-Preston, Terrence Terrell, Trell Woodberry, Howie Bell, Cecelia Friday, Ricco Ross and Koryn Hawthorne.

== Release ==
The film had a theatrical release on 7 November 2025.
