= Harry Potter: Hogwarts Tournament of Houses =

- Genre: Game show
- Directed by: Carrie Havel
- Presented by: Helen Mirren
- Country of origin: United States
- Original language: English
- No. of seasons: 1
- No. of episodes: 4

Production
- Executive producers: Robin Ashbrook; Yasmin Shackleton; David Heyman
- Producers: Mike Darnell; Brooke Karzen; Dan Sacks
- Running time: 40–42 minutes
- Production companies: The Old School; Warner Horizon Unscripted Television

Original release
- Network: TBS; Cartoon Network
- Release: November 28 – December 19, 2021

Harry Potter: Hogwarts Tournament of Houses is a game show that aired on TBS and Cartoon Network from November 28 to December 19, 2021. Hosted by Helen Mirren, the show was intended as a tribute in celebration of the 20th anniversary of the Harry Potter film series. It features four trios competing in answering trivia questions regarding the Harry Potter universe in order to take home the title of House Cup Champion and win prizes.

== Format ==
The show is a trivia competition based on Harry Potter-related content. It features four teams of three Harry Potter fans, each representing a Hogwarts house (namely Gryffindor, Hufflepuff, Ravenclaw and Slytherin), competing against each other to earn the title of House Cup Champion.

The winning team also receives prizes, including a $1,000 shopping spree at the Harry Potter Store New York, tickets to the Broadway production of Harry Potter and the Cursed Child at the Lyric Theatre in New York City and advance screenings for the film Fantastic Beasts: The Secrets of Dumbledore (2022).

== Episodes ==
No.	Title	Original release date
1	"Gryffindor vs. Hufflepuff"	November 28, 2021
Guest stars include Pete Davidson, Simon Fisher-Becker, Matthew Lewis, Luke Youngblood, and Trey Sartorius.
2	"Slytherin vs. Ravenclaw"	December 5, 2021
Guest starring Tom Felton, Shirley Henderson, Jay Leno, and Luke Youngblood.
3	"The Wildcard Round"	December 12, 2021
The two houses that lost the first two rounds go head-to-head to compete for a place in the grand finale. Guest stars include Matthew Lewis, Tom Felton, Dan Fogler and Luke Youngblood.
4	"The Grand Finale"	December 19, 2021
The finale will include lots of wizarding trivia, tons of guest stars and classic film clips to determine the winner of the inaugural Hogwarts Tournament of Houses trophy. Guest stars include Simon Fisher-Becker, Tom Felton, Harry Taylor and Luke Youngblood.

== Release ==
Harry Potter: Hogwarts Tournament of Houses was broadcast on TBS and Cartoon Network from November 28 to December 19, 2021. It was also made available for streaming on HBO Max.

The show was also released in several platforms internationally, including Crave in Canada, Sky Max and Now in the United Kingdom and Ireland, Sky Cinema and Sky One in Germany, Sky Uno, Now and Boing in Italy, TMC and TFX in France, Fox8, Foxtel Now and Binge in Australia, TVNZ 2 and TVNZ OnDemand in New Zealand, Amazon Prime Video in India, Cartoon Network and HBO Go in Singapore, Malaysia, Indonesia, Vietnam, Thailand, the Philippines, Taiwan and Hong Kong, Cartoon Network, Warner Channel and HBO Max in Latin America, and Boing in Spain.

== Reception ==
=== Critical response ===
Tara Bennett of IGN gave the series four stars, calling it "an entertaining, and sometimes challenging, celebration of all things Potter".

Anita Singh of The Daily Telegraph gave it one star, stating it was the "worst role" of Helen Mirren's career, and that "this cringe-inducing, horribly Americanised Harry Potter quiz is abysmal in every way".

=== Accolades ===
Year	Award	Category	Nominee(s)	Results	Ref.
2022	Art Directors Guild Awards	Excellence in Production Design for a Variety, Reality or Competition Series	John Janavs (for "Gryffindor vs. Hufflepuff")	Won	
2022	Children's and Family Emmy Awards	Outstanding Host	Helen Mirren	Won	
2022	Children's and Family Emmy Awards	Outstanding Lighting Design for a Live Action Program	Simon Miles	Won	
2022	Hollywood Critics Association TV Awards	Best Cable Reality Show or Competition Series	Harry Potter: Hogwarts Tournament of Houses	Nominated	
2022	Make-Up Artists and Hair Stylists Guild Awards	Best Period Hair Styling and/or Character Hair Styling	Troy Zestos and Johnny Lomeli	Nominated	
2022	Producers Guild of America Awards	Outstanding Children's Program	Harry Potter: Hogwarts Tournament of Houses	Nominated	
2022	Set Decorators Society of America Awards	Best Achievement in Décor/Design of a Variety, Reality or Competition	Heidi Miller and John Janavs	Won	
