= My Long Goodbye =

- Scrubs episode
- Episode no.: Season 6 Episode 15
- Directed by: Victor Nelli, Jr.
- Written by: Dave Tennant
- Production code: 615
- Original air date: April 5, 2007

Guest appearances
- Aloma Wright as Laverne Roberts; Christa Miller as Jordan Sullivan; Sam Lloyd as Ted Buckland; Travis Schuldt as Keith Dudemeister; Robert Maschio as Todd Quinlan; Keeshan Giles as Lester Roberts; Michael Bullard as Man; Nicole Sullivan as Jill Tracy; Mike Schwartz as Lloyd

Episode chronology
← Previous "My No Good Reason"	Next → "My Words of Wisdom"
- Scrubs season 6

"My Long Goodbye" is the fifteenth episode of the sixth season and 132rd overall episode of the American television sitcom Scrubs. It originally aired on April 5, 2007 on NBC, and was written by Dave Tennant and directed by Victor Nelli, Jr. It is noteworthy for being the last regular episode featuring Aloma Wright as Laverne Roberts, a regular recurring character since the pilot episode.

A direct sequel to "My No Good Reason", it depicts each cast member saying their goodbyes to coworker Laverne, who is in a non-responsive coma due to injuries she sustained in a car accident, and whose life support will soon be turned off by her family. The title of the episode refers to Carla Espinosa's (Judy Reyes) difficulty in saying goodbye to Laverne, ghostly visions of whom appear to Carla to encourage her in this endeavor.

The episode was well-received, with critics praising Reyes's performance and the emotional drama of the story. The episode won the Humanitas Prize, for the second time in the series history.

== Plot ==
Sacred Heart's staff starts saying goodbye to Laverne, who suffered terminal injuries after getting into a car accident. However, Carla Espinosa tells everyone that Laverne could still pull through. In deep denial, Carla hallucinates that she sees Laverne's spirit following her around and talking to her.

The whole staff is heart-broken when Laverne's latest CT scans arrive; she's brain dead. Laverne's family decides to take her off life support, and one by one the main characters say their own goodbyes to Laverne. Carla, in the end, learns from Laverne's spirit that she must say goodbye to the people she cares for before she loses her chance, and says her own tearful goodbye to Laverne. As Carla walks out of the room and collapses in tears in Turk's arms, Laverne finally dies and her spirit passes away.

Meanwhile, Dr. Cox confides in J.D. that he doesn't want people to know of his daughter's birth because it will be associated with Laverne's death, but still tells Jordan that he has told others. Jordan becomes suspicious because no one has come to congratulate her other than J.D. Even when Laverne passes away, Jordan still does not get admirers, and in desperation she declares an ecstatic J.D. the child's godfather and agrees to name her baby Jennifer Dylan (J.D.).

Cox, Elliot, Turk, Carla, Kelso, and the Janitor go to the bar to toast Laverne's memory. Elliot congratulates Cox on the new baby and ponders that the room must be a madhouse, only for Cox to remember and reveal that the only people who know are at the bar with him. He brushes it off, thinking nothing bad will come of it, unaware of what Jordan did.

== Reception ==
"My Long Goodbye" received very positive reviews from critics. IGN gave the episode a score of 8.5 out of 10, and praising Laverne's death scene, mainly for Judy Reyes performance and for Carla's final goodbye, stating that is "a moment both emotional and funny, but always honest", and that "Reyes hits it out of the park with her performance". However, he regretted that Wright "doesn't get anything as juicy for herself", although admitting "this choice doesn't lessen the impact any as the show says goodbye to a familiar face"

AOL TV's reviewer gave "My Long Goodbye" a positive review. He praised the character's farewells, especially from Elliot, Carla and the Janitor, and also J.D's inner monologues. He stated "All and all, a good, solid episode and a nice good-bye to Laverne, one of the unsung players on this program."

== Aftermath ==
Although this is Aloma Wright's last regular appearance as Laverne Roberts, she returned in the Season 7 episode "My Hard Labor" as Nurse Shirley, whose similarities to Laverne go unnoticed by all except J.D. Early reports stated that Aloma Wright would return as Laverne's alcoholic twin sister. Wright would reprise her role as Laverne in a flashback in the season 8 episode "My Comedy Show" and in the season eight finale, "My Finale".
