= List of awards and nominations received by Scrubs =

Scrubs awards and nominations
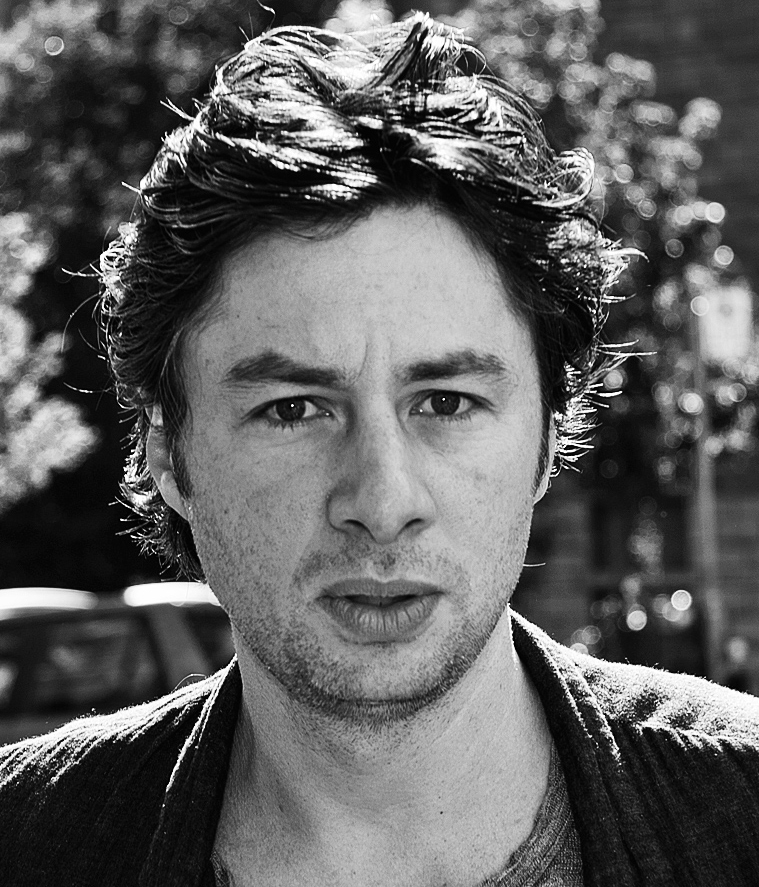
- Zach Braff has been critically lauded for his portrayal of J.D. and was nominated for 14 awards including one Emmy and three Golden Globe Awards.
Awards and nominations
Award	Wins	Nominations
Artios Awards	1	6
BET Comedy Awards	2	2
BMI TV Music Awards	2	2
Cinema Audio Society Awards	0	1
Emmy Awards	2	17
Golden Globe Awards	0	3
Golden Reel Awards	1	3
Humanitas Prize	3	6
Imagen Awards	0	2
NAACP Image Awards	0	6
Peabody Awards	1	1
People's Choice Awards	0	1
Producers Guild of America Awards	0	3
Satellite Awards	0	6
Teen Choice Awards	0	15
TCA Awards	0	3
TV Land Awards	1	1
Writers Guild of America Awards	0	1
Young Artist Awards	0	1

Totals (Note: Certain award groups do not simply award one winner. They acknowledge several different recipients, have runners-up, and have third place. Since this is a specific recognition and is different from losing an award, runner-up mentions are considered wins in this award tally. For simplification and to avoid errors, each award in this list has been presumed to have had a prior nomination.)
- Wins: 15
- Nominations: 84

Scrubs, an American comedy-drama series, has been nominated for a variety of different awards including 17 Emmy Awards (with two wins), in categories such as casting, cinematography, directing, editing, and writing. Its fourth season earned the series its first nomination for Outstanding Comedy Series.

Series regulars Zach Braff, Donald Faison, Sarah Chalke, John C. McGinley, Judy Reyes and Christa Miller all earned nominations for their acting. Braff's performance was very praised, and he was nominated for an Emmy and three Golden Globe Awards. Despite this, only Faison and Reyes won awards.

"My Musical" is one of the most critically acclaimed episodes of Scrubs and was nominated for five Emmy Awards, a Cinema Audio Society Award and a Golden Reel Award, with one Emmy and one Golden Reel Award won.

The show won the 2002, 2008, and 2009 Humanitas Prize in the 30-minute category for the episodes "My Old Lady", "My Long Goodbye" and "My Last Words" respectively. While the episodes "My Screw Up", "My Way Home" and "My Fallen Idol" received nominations.

The fifth season episode "My Way Home" earned the show a Peabody Award, the industry’s most competitive honor.

== Awards and nominations ==
Awards and nominations received by Scrubs
Award	Year (Note: The listed year refers to the date of the ceremony, not necessarily the year in which the corresponding season or episode aired.)	Category	Nominee(s)	Result	Ref.
ALMA Awards	2002	Outstanding Actress in a Television Series	Judy Reyes	Nominated	
ALMA Awards	2006	Outstanding Actress in a Television Series	Judy Reyes	Won	
ALMA Awards	2007	Outstanding Director – Television Series, Mini-Series, Television Movie	Linda Mendoza (for "My Déjà Vu, My Déjà Vu")	Nominated	
ALMA Awards	2008	Outstanding Female Performance in a Comedy Television Series	Judy Reyes	Won	
Artios Awards	2002	Best Casting for TV, Comedy Episodic	Brett Benner and Debby Romano	Nominated	
Artios Awards	2002	Best Casting for TV, Comedy Pilot	Brett Benner and Debby Romano	Won	
Artios Awards	2003	Best Casting for TV, Comedy Episodic	Brett Benner and Debby Romano	Nominated	
Artios Awards	2004	Best Casting for TV, Comedy Episodic	Brett Benner and Debby Romano	Nominated	
Artios Awards	2005	Best Casting for TV, Comedy Episodic	Brett Benner and Debby Romano	Nominated	
Artios Awards	2006	Best Casting for TV, Comedy Episodic	Brett Benner and Debby Romano	Nominated	
BET Comedy Awards	2004	Outstanding Supporting Actor in a Comedy Series	Donald Faison	Won	
BET Comedy Awards	2005	Outstanding Supporting Actor in a Comedy Series	Donald Faison	Won	
BMI Film & TV Awards	2003	BMI TV Music Award	Tim Bright, Chad Fischer, Chris Link, and Jan Stevens	Won	
BMI Film & TV Awards	2004	BMI TV Music Award	Tim Bright, Chad Fischer, Chris Link, and Jan Stevens	Won	
Cinema Audio Society Awards	2008	Outstanding Achievement in Sound Mixing for Television Series	Joe Foglia, John W. Cook II, and Peter Nusbaum (for "My Musical")	Nominated	
Golden Globe Awards	2005	Best Actor – Television Series Musical or Comedy	Zach Braff	Nominated	
Golden Globe Awards	2006	Best Actor – Television Series Musical or Comedy	Zach Braff	Nominated	
Golden Globe Awards	2007	Best Actor – Television Series Musical or Comedy	Zach Braff	Nominated	
Golden Reel Awards	2003	Best Sound Editing in Television Episodic – Music	Becca Borawski (for "My Overkill")	Nominated	
Golden Reel Awards	2004	Best Sound Editing in Television Episodic – Music	Becca Borawski (for "My Philosophy")	Nominated	
Golden Reel Awards	2008	Best Sound Editing – Music for Short Form Television	Becca Borawski and Lisa A. Arpino (for "My Musical")	Won	
Humanitas Prizes	2002	30 Minute Category	Matt Tarses (for "My Old Lady")	Won	
Humanitas Prizes	2004	30 Minute Category	Neil Goldman and Garrett Donovan (for "My Screw Up")	Nominated	
Humanitas Prizes	2006	30 Minute Category	Neil Goldman and Garrett Donovan (for "My Way Home")	Nominated	
Humanitas Prizes	2007	30 Minute Category	Bill Callahan (for "My Fallen Idol")	Nominated	
Humanitas Prizes	2008	30 Minute Category	Dave Tennant (for "My Long Goodbye")	Won	
Humanitas Prizes	2009	30 Minute Category	Aseem Batra (for "My Last Words")	Won	
Imagen Awards	2005	Best Actress - Television	Judy Reyes	Nominated	
Imagen Awards	2007	Best Actress - Television	Judy Reyes	Nominated	
NAACP Image Awards	2005	Outstanding Supporting Actor in a Comedy Series	Donald Faison	Nominated	
NAACP Image Awards	2006	Outstanding Actor in a Comedy Series	Donald Faison	Nominated	
NAACP Image Awards	2007	Outstanding Actor in a Comedy Series	Donald Faison	Nominated	
NAACP Image Awards	2008	Outstanding Actor in a Comedy Series	Donald Faison	Nominated	
NAACP Image Awards	2009	Outstanding Actor in a Comedy Series	Donald Faison	Nominated	
NAACP Image Awards	2010	Outstanding Actor in a Comedy Series	Donald Faison	Nominated	
Peabody Awards	2006	—	Scrubs (for "My Way Home")	Won	
People's Choice Awards	2005	Favorite Television Comedy	Scrubs	Nominated	
Primetime Emmy Awards	2002	Outstanding Directing for a Comedy Series	Marc Buckland (for "My Old Lady")	Nominated	
Primetime Emmy Awards	2004	Outstanding Writing for a Comedy Series	Neil Goldman and Garrett Donovan (for "My Screw Up")	Nominated	
Primetime Emmy Awards	2005	Outstanding Comedy Series	Scrubs (Note: Nominees: Bill Lawrence, Randall Winston, Tim Hobert, Matt Tarses, Eric Weinberg, Gabrielle Allan, Neil Goldman, Garrett Donovan, Tad Quill, Bill Callahan, and Mike Schwartz)	Nominated	
Primetime Emmy Awards	2005	Outstanding Lead Actor in a Comedy Series	Zach Braff	Nominated	
Primetime Emmy Awards	2006	Outstanding Comedy Series	Scrubs (Note: Nominees: Bill Lawrence, Randall Winston, Tim Hobert, Eric Weinberg, Neil Goldman, Garrett Donovan, Tad Quill, Bill Callahan, Mike Schwartz, Janae Bakken, Debra Fordham, and Mark Stegemann)	Nominated	
Primetime Emmy Awards	2007	Outstanding Directing for a Comedy Series	Will Mackenzie (for "My Musical")	Nominated	
Primetime Creative Arts Emmy Awards	2002	Outstanding Casting for a Comedy Series	Brett Benner and Debby Romano	Nominated	
Primetime Creative Arts Emmy Awards	2003	Outstanding Casting for a Comedy Series	Brett Benner and Debby Romano	Nominated	
Primetime Creative Arts Emmy Awards	2004	Outstanding Single-Camera Picture Editing for a Comedy Series	John Michel (for "My Screw Up")	Nominated	
Primetime Creative Arts Emmy Awards	2005	Outstanding Casting for a Comedy Series	Brett Benner and Debby Romano	Nominated	
Primetime Creative Arts Emmy Awards	2005	Outstanding Multi-Camera Picture Editing for a Series	John Michel (for "My Life in Four Cameras")	Won	
Primetime Creative Arts Emmy Awards	2007	Outstanding Music Direction	Jan Stevens (for "My Musical")	Nominated	
Primetime Creative Arts Emmy Awards	2007	Outstanding Original Music and Lyrics	Debra Fordham, Robert Lopez, and Jeff Marx (for "Everything Comes Down to Poo" from "My Musical")	Nominated	
Primetime Creative Arts Emmy Awards	2007	Outstanding Original Music and Lyrics	Debra Fordham and Paul F. Perry (for "Guy Love" from "My Musical")	Nominated	
Primetime Creative Arts Emmy Awards	2007	Outstanding Sound Mixing for a Comedy or Drama Series (Half-Hour) and Animation	Joe Foglia, John W. Cook II, and Peter Nusbaum (for "My Musical")	Won	
Primetime Creative Arts Emmy Awards	2008	Outstanding Cinematography for a Half-Hour Series	John Inwood (for "My Princess")	Nominated	
Primetime Creative Arts Emmy Awards	2009	Outstanding Sound Mixing for a Comedy or Drama Series (Half-Hour) and Animation	Joe Foglia, Eric Pierce, John W. Cook II, and Peter Nusbaum (for "My Jerks")	Nominated	
Producers Guild of America Awards	2004	Television Producer of the Year Award in Episodic Comedy	Scrubs (Note: Nominees: Bill Lawrence and Randall Winston)	Nominated	
Producers Guild of America Awards	2005	Television Producer of the Year Award in Episodic Comedy	Scrubs	Nominated	
Producers Guild of America Awards	2006	Television Producer of the Year Award in Episodic Comedy	Scrubs	Nominated	
Satellite Awards	2003	Best Actor – Television Series Musical or Comedy	John C. McGinley	Nominated	
Satellite Awards	2003	Best Supporting Actress – Television Series	Christa Miller	Nominated	
Satellite Awards	2003	Best Television Series – Musical or Comedy	Scrubs	Nominated	
Satellite Awards	2004	Best Supporting Actress – Television Series	Christa Miller	Nominated	
Satellite Awards	2005	Best Actor – Television Series Musical or Comedy	Zach Braff	Nominated	
Satellite Awards	2005	Best Television Series – Musical or Comedy	Scrubs	Nominated	
Teen Choice Awards	2002	Choice TV: Comedy Series	Scrubs	Nominated	
Teen Choice Awards	2002	Choice TV: Breakout Show	Scrubs	Nominated	
Teen Choice Awards	2002	Choice TV: Comedy Actor	Zach Braff	Nominated	
Teen Choice Awards	2003	Choice TV – Comedy	Scrubs	Nominated	
Teen Choice Awards	2003	Choice TV Actor – Comedy	Zach Braff	Nominated	
Teen Choice Awards	2003	Choice TV Actress – Comedy	Sarah Chalke	Nominated	
Teen Choice Awards	2004	Choice TV Show: Comedy	Scrubs	Nominated	
Teen Choice Awards	2004	Choice TV Actor: Comedy	Zach Braff	Nominated	
Teen Choice Awards	2004	Choice TV: Sidekick	Donald Faison	Nominated	
Teen Choice Awards	2005	Choice TV: Comedy Series	Scrubs	Nominated	
Teen Choice Awards	2005	Choice TV: Comedy Actor	Zach Braff	Nominated	
Teen Choice Awards	2005	Choice TV: Sidekick	Donald Faison	Nominated	
Teen Choice Awards	2006	Choice TV: Comedy Actor	Zach Braff	Nominated	
Teen Choice Awards	2006	Choice TV: Sidekick	Donald Faison	Nominated	
Teen Choice Awards	2007	Choice TV: Sidekick	Donald Faison	Nominated	
Television Critics Association Awards	2002	Outstanding Achievement in Comedy	Scrubs	Nominated	
Television Critics Association Awards	2002	Individual Achievement in Comedy	John C. McGinley	Nominated	
Television Critics Association Awards	2006	Outstanding Achievement in Comedy	Scrubs	Nominated	
Writers Guild of America Awards	2003	Television: Episodic Comedy	Bill Lawrence (for "My First Day")	Nominated	
Young Artist Awards	2003	Best Performance in a TV Comedy or Drama Series – Guest Starring Young Actress Age Ten or Under	Christina Lee	Nominated	
