= Tyler Perry's Young Dylan =

American comedy television series

- Genre: Comedy
- Created by: Tyler Perry
- Starring: Dylan Gilmer; Celina Smith; Hero Hunter; Jet Miller; Mieko Hillman; Aloma Lesley Wright; Carl Anthony Payne, II
- Composer: Elvin Ross
- Country of origin: United States
- Original language: English
- No. of seasons: 5
- No. of episodes: 85 (list of episodes)

Production
- Executive producers: Michelle Sneed; Tyler Perry
- Producers: Mark E. Swinton; Will Areu
- Cinematography: Terrence Burke
- Camera setup: Multi-camera
- Running time: 22–23 minutes
- Production companies: Tyler Perry Studios; Nickelodeon Productions

Original release
- Network: Nickelodeon
- Release: February 29, 2020 – April 30, 2025

Tyler Perry's Young Dylan is an American comedy television series created by Tyler Perry that aired on Nickelodeon from February 29, 2020 to April 30, 2025. The series stars Dylan Gilmer, Celina Smith, Hero Hunter, Jet Miller, Mieko Hillman, Aloma Lesley Wright, and Carl Anthony Payne, II.

== Premise ==
Young Dylan is an aspiring hip-hop artist. When his mother doesn't come home one day, his grandmother Viola moves him in with his uncle Myles and aunt Yasmine to have parental figures in his life. His style clashes with the styles of Myles' family.

== Cast ==
=== Main ===
- Dylan Gilmer as Young Dylan, an aspiring hip-hop artist
- Celina Smith as Rebecca, Young Dylan's older cousin and Charlie's older sister
- Hero Hunter as Charlie, Young Dylan's cousin, who used to have an imaginary friend
- Jet Miller as Bethany, Rebecca's best friend and Young Dylan's love interest
- Mieko Hillman as Yasmine, Young Dylan's aunt, Charlie and Rebecca's mother, Viola's daughter-in-law and Myles's wife
- Aloma Lesley Wright as Viola, Young Dylan, Charlie and Rebecca's grandmother, Myles's mother and Yasmine's mother-in-law
- Carl Anthony Payne, II as Myles Wilson, Young Dylan's uncle, Charlie and Rebecca's father, Yasmine's husband and Viola's son

=== Recurring ===
- Rodney Hobbs / Rodney J. Hobbs as Principal Matthews
- Samuel Goergen as Booder
- Diesel La Torraca as Ace
- Ryder Duncan as Christian
- Rowan Bousaid as Mr. Elliot

=== Notable guest stars ===
- Khaled "DJ Khaled" Khaled as himself
- Chance the Rapper as himself
- Pi'erre Bourne as himself

== Production ==
On October 2, 2019, it was announced on The Ellen DeGeneres Show that Nickelodeon and Tyler Perry were teaming up to create a comedy series about a 10-year-old rapper with a working title of Young Dylan. Tyler Perry serves as writer for the series, while Tyler Perry Studios produces the series. The series stars Dylan Gilmer as Young Dylan. On January 23, 2020, the cast for the series was announced. In addition to Dylan Gilmer, the cast also includes Carl Anthony Payne II, Mieko Hillman, Celina Smith, Hero Hunter, and Aloma Wright. Tyler Perry also serves as executive producer and director for the series. Michelle Sneed serves as executive producer. Will Areu and Mark E. Swinton serve as producers. Jet Miller was also included in the principal cast as Rebecca's friend Bethany. On February 19, 2020, it was announced that Tyler Perry's Young Dylan, previously Young Dylan, would premiere on February 29, 2020. The series had been given a 14-episode order.

On March 18, 2021, the series was renewed for a second season of 20 episodes, which premiered on June 12, 2021. On November 11, 2021, the series was renewed for a third season of 20 episodes, which premiered on June 19, 2022.

On July 3, 2024, the series was renewed for a 13-episode fifth season, which premiered on December 18, 2024. On May 5, 2025, it was reported that the series was canceled after five seasons.

== Episodes ==
Season	Episodes	Originally released	
Season	Episodes	First released	Last released
1	14	February 29, 2020	October 3, 2020
2	20	June 12, 2021	December 9, 2021
3	19	June 19, 2022	April 13, 2023
4	19	September 6, 2023	January 10, 2024
5	13	December 18, 2024	April 30, 2025

== Reception ==
=== Critical response ===
Melissa Camacho of Common Sense Media rated the series a 3 out of 5 stars, stating that "this lighthearted series, which is reminiscent of the ‘90s hit The Fresh Prince of Bel-Air, offers a traditional "fish out of water" narrative."

=== Ratings ===
Viewership and ratings per season of Tyler Perry's Young Dylan
Season	Episodes	First aired		Last aired		Avg. viewers (millions)
Season	Episodes	Date	Viewers (millions)	Date	Viewers (millions)	Avg. viewers (millions)
1	14	February 29, 2020	0.63	October 3, 2020	0.40	0.51
2	20	June 12, 2021	0.30	December 9, 2021	0.28	0.31
3	19	June 19, 2022	0.26	April 13, 2023	0.16	0.18
4	13	September 6, 2023	0.09	January 10, 2024	TBD	0.11

=== Awards and nominations ===
Year	Award	Category	Nominee(s)	Result	Refs
2021	Kids' Choice Awards	Favorite Male TV Star	Dylan Gilmer	Nominated	
2022	Kids' Choice Awards	Favorite Male TV Star (Kids)	Young Dylan	Nominated	
2023	Kids' Choice Awards	Favorite Male TV Star (Kids)	Young Dylan	Nominated	
