= Aloma Wright =

American actress (born 1950)

- Born: March 10, 1950 (age 76); New York City, U.S.
- Occupation: Actress
- Years active: 1995–present

Aloma Wright (born March 10, 1950) is an American actress. Her television roles include Laverne Roberts and Shirley Richards on the NBC/ABC comedy series Scrubs (2001–2009), Maxine Landis on the NBC daytime drama series Days of Our Lives (2008–2015), Mildred Clemons on the ABC drama series Private Practice (2011–2013), Gretchen Bodinski on the USA Network drama series Suits (2015–2019), and Viola in Tyler Perry's Young Dylan.

== Early life ==
Wright was born in New York and raised in California. She attended the American Academy of Dramatic Arts in New York City.

== Career ==
Wright began her acting career on stage, before appearing in films like Stuart Saves His Family, Devil in the Flesh, and Shadow Hours, and television shows such as Suddenly Susan, Dangerous Minds, Frasier, Friends, Malcolm in the Middle, Ally McBeal, Girlfriends, and Judging Amy. She also had a recurring role in the Fox series Power Rangers in Space in 1998. She was in the Steve Harvey show as Lovita’s aunt. She also had a recurring role as Ms. Shirley on the series The Soul Man. In 1999, she was in Friends, playing the memorable saleswoman who only offered Ross $4 in store credit for his broken couch in the episode "The One with the Cop" (Season 6, Episode 16).

In 2001, Wright was cast as Laverne Roberts in the NBC comedy series, Scrubs. After six seasons, her character was killed off in "My Long Goodbye". She returned in season seven playing a new character, Nurse Shirley. She later returned to play Nurse Roberts in the season 8 finale, "My Finale", as JD is looking back on all the people in his life. In 2000s, Wright also guest starred on NYPD Blue, Cold Case, NCIS, and Mad Men. She also had supporting parts in films such as Bring It On, The Brothers, Mr. Deeds and Johnson Family Vacation.

In 2008, Wright began appearing as nurse Maxine Landis in the NBC daytime soap opera, Days of Our Lives. From 2012 to 2013, Wright also had the recurring role as Mildred Clemons in the Shonda Rhimes' series, Private Practice, and in 2015 appeared in an episode of Scandal. In 2015, she joined the cast of USA Network legal series Suits for season five as secretary, Gretchen Bodinski, working first for Harvey Specter and then for Louis Litt. She appeared on the show in a recurring basis until the series finale aired in 2019. In 2020, she was cast as Viola, the title character's grandmother in the Nickelodeon sitcom Young Dylan created by Tyler Perry.

== Filmography ==
=== Film ===
Year	Title	Role	Notes
1995	Stuart Saves His Family	Autograph Seeker	
1998	Dearly Devoted	Secretary	Video
1998	About Sarah	Claudia Avery	TV movie
1998	I Married a Monster	Desk Clerk	TV movie
1999	Trippin'	Louise Reed	
2000	Sonic Impact	Travel Agent	
2000	Shadow Hours	Nurse Johnson	
2000	Bring It On	Pauletta	
2001	Kingdom Come	Veda	
2001	Motocrossed	Barbara Rollins	TV movie
2001	The Brothers	Helen Palmer	
2001	When Billie Beat Bobby	Convalescent Home Nurse	TV movie
2001	Patient Diversity: Beyond the Vital Signs	Mrs. Humpherys	Short
2002	Mr. Deeds	Coretta Keeling	
2002	Try Seventeen	Alicia	
2003	Deliver Us from Eva	Reverend Washington	
2004	Johnson Family Vacation	Glorietta Johnson	
2005	Thank You for Smoking	Gizelle (voice)	
2005	The Gospel	Ernestine	
2005	Ralph & Stanley	Receptionist	Short
2005	Family Reunion	Bernadine Porter	
2006	Grad Night	Principal Wheeler	
2007	Love... & Other 4 Letter Words	Nana	
2007	Lord Help Us	Melvina Thomas	Video
2007	Universal Remote	Judge Vintage	
2007	Ben 10: Race Against Time	Mrs. Dalton	TV movie
2008	After School	Ma Dear	
2009	Redemption	Harriet	Short
2009	Janky Promoters	Ms. Ann	
2009	Hurricane in the Rose Garden	Miriam Egba	Video
2009	Touched	Miss Esther	
2010	My American Nurse 2	Madam Mississippi	
2010	My Girlfriend's Back	Cynthia	
2011	Okoto the Messenger	Mrs. Joy Nkuku	
2012	Dinner Date	Elle	Short
2012	Sistaah Friend	Super Shero of Wisdom	Short
2014	More to Love	Aunt Fran	
2014	Clarissa's Gift	Mrs. Bessie Wells	Short
2016	Diva Diaries	Auntie Nana	
2019	Baking Christmas	Patty	TV movie
2020	The Christmas Edition	Edna	TV movie
2021	7 Sharp	Gammy	Short
2021	Our Christmas Journey	Robin	TV movie

=== Television ===
Year	Title	Role	Notes
1995	Night Stand with Dick Dietrick	Blanche	Episode: "Mama's Boys"
1996	Suddenly Susan	Rachel	Episode: "Suddenly Susan Unplugged"
1996	Dangerous Minds	James's Grandmother	Episode: "Family Ties" & "Jumped"
1998	Mike Hammer, Private Eye	Nanny Morgan	Episode: "A New Leaf: Part 2"
1998	Power Rangers in Space	Adelle Ferguson	Recurring Cast
1999	The Steve Harvey Show	Tulabett	Episode: "Working Homegirl"
1999	Frasier	Maria	Episode: "To Tell the Truth"
1999	Friends	The Saleswoman	Episode: "The One with the Cop"
1999	Silk Stalkings	Clerk	Episode: "Dance Fever"
1999	The Drew Carey Show	Security Officer	Episode: "Good Vibrations"
1999–2000	Ally McBeal	Judge Aloma Harris	Guest Cast: Seasons 3-4
2000	Malcolm in the Middle	Nurse	Episode: "Home Alone 4"
2000	Cover Me	Receptionist	Episode: "Our Mr. Brooks"
2000	The Invisible Man	Nurse Cathy	Episode: "It Hurts When You Do This"
2000	Girlfriends	Laurie's Mother	Episode: "The Remains of the Date"
2000	Providence	Orderly	Episode: "Rescue Me"
2000	The Trouble with Normal	Church Secretary	Episode: "Clairanoia"
2000–2001	Judging Amy	Judge Roberta Pattison	Guest Cast: Season 1-2
2000–2001	The Parkers	Shirley West	Guest Cast: Season 1 & 3
2001	Mysterious Ways	Peggy's Mom	Episode: "Wonderful"
2001	18 Wheels of Justice	Miss Lopez	Episode: "Dream Girls"
2001–2009	Scrubs	Laverne Roberts Shirley	Recurring role (Seasons 1–6); Guest role (season 8) Recurring role (season 7)
2002	The Guardian	Grandma Annie	Episode: "Solidarity"
2002	The Drew Carey Show	Mrs. Taylor	Episode: "Never Been to Spain"
2002	Even Stevens	Mother Wexler	Episode: "Dirty Work"
2002	The Practice	Corrections Officer	Episode: "Convictions"
2004	NYPD Blue	Florence George	Episode: "Chatty Chatty Bang Bang"
2004	Crossing Jordan	Desk Nurse	Episode: "You're Not Alone"
2004	The Bernie Mac Show	-	Episode: "Mac Overdrive"
2004	Cold Case	Della Lincoln	Episode: "The Badlands"
2004	Kevin Hill	Nana Bea	Episode: "Full Metal Jessie"
2005	Committed	Constance James	Episode: "The Mother Episode"
2006	NCIS	Nurse Ethel Washington	Episode: "Hiatus (Part #1)"
2007	The Bill Engvall Show	Dotty	Episode: "Have You Seen My Muffins, Man?"
2007–2015	Days of Our Lives	Maxine Landis	Regular Cast
2008	Mad Men	Viola	Episode: "The Inheritance"
2009–2011	Tyler Perry's House of Payne	Eunice	Guest Cast: Seasons 5 & 7
2010	Zeke and Luther	Nurse	Episode: "Zeke Jumps the Shark"
2011	Harry's Law	Nancy Jones	Episode: "Last Dance"
2011	9ine	Nana Goodall	Recurring Cast
2011	The Celibate Nympho Chronicles	Mabaleen	Recurring Cast
2011	Parenthood	Natalie	Episode: "Nora"
2012–2013	Private Practice	Mildred Clemons	Recurring Cast: Seasons 5-6
2013	The Rev	Sister Johnson	Recurring Cast
2014	Growing Up Fisher	Tricia	Episode: "Desk/Job"
2014	The Middle	Cashier	Episode: "The Optimist"
2015	Scandal	Tina Wilson	Episode: "The Lawn Chair"
2015	Ward of the State	Evelyn	Episode: "Pilot"
2015–2016	The Soul Man	Shirley	Guest: Season 4, Recurring Cast: Season 5
2015–2019	Suits	Gretchen Bodinski	Recurring Cast: Seasons 5-9
2016	Masters of Sex	County Clerk	Episode: "The Eyes of God"
2017	The Carmichael Show	Aunt Clarice	Episode: "Lesbian Wedding"
2017–2018	The Guest Book	Emma	Recurring Cast: Season 1, Guest: Season 2
2018	Champions	Sister Timothy	Episode: "Matt Bomer Poster"
2018	Lucifer	Party Bus Driver	Episode: "All Hands on Decker"
2018	Claws	Ms. Wallace	Episode: "Double Dutch"
2019	Forky Asks a Question	Officer Rib Tickles (voice)	Episode: "What Is a Pet?"
2020	Raven's Home	Ms. Pearl	Episode: "What About Your Friends?"
2020–2025	Tyler Perry's Young Dylan	Viola Wilson	Main Cast
