= Carl Anthony Payne II =

American actor (born 1969)

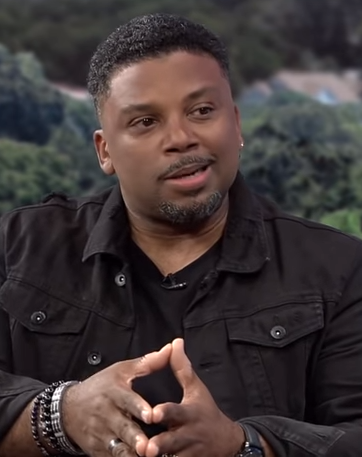
- Payne in 2018
- Born: May 24, 1969 (age 56); Clinton, South Carolina, U.S.
- Other names: Carl Payne
- Occupation: Actor
- Years active: 1985–present

Carl Anthony Payne II (born May 24, 1969) is an American actor. He is known for his roles as Cole Brown on the Fox sitcom Martin and Walter "Cockroach" Bradley on the NBC sitcom The Cosby Show, Carl on Rock Me Baby, Curtis on the sitcom George Lopez (2002–2003), and as Myles Wilson on Tyler Perry's Young Dylan.

== Early life ==
Payne was born in South Carolina and raised in Harlem, New York. He studied acting at the First All Children's Theater, an off-Broadway repertory theatre company. He graduated from Fiorello H. LaGuardia High School of Music & Art and Performing Arts in New York and Howard University.

== Acting career ==
Carl Payne is known for his role as Cole Brown on the Fox sitcom Martin and his recurring role as Theo Huxtable's best friend Cockroach on the NBC sitcom The Cosby Show.

Payne played Reynaldo St. James on the BET series The Game. He directed and produced music videos, web series and short films, all while continuing to tour the country as a stand-up comic. He even starred in the series For Richer or For Poorer, whose stars were LeToya Luckett and Rockmond Dunbar.

Payne also played an FBI agent, turned FCC field agent, on The Rickey Smiley Show.

== Filmography ==
=== Film ===
Year	Title	Role	Notes
1985	The Last Dragon	Kid in Pizza Shop	
1990	Goodnight Sweet Wife: A Murder in Boston	DeWayne	TV movie
1991	Line of Fire: The Morris Dees Story	Michael Donald	TV movie
1996	Ed	Stats Jefferson	
1998	Overnight Delivery	Wheels	Video
1999	The Breaks	Chris	
1999	Black and White	Ernie Pitts	
2003	Swirl	Beethoven	
2003	Get Money	Eric	Video
2008	Hood Hostages	Homeless	Video
2008	Feast II: Sloppy Seconds	Slasher	Video
2009	Mimi's Place	Scooter	Short
2009	The Messenger	Pitterson's Father	
2009	Feast III: The Happy Finish	Slasher	Video
2009	There's A Stranger in My House	Bailey	
2010	Baby Mama's Club	-	
2010	Let God Be the Judge	Brian Matthews	
2010	Love Me or Leave Me	Joseph Wyatt	TV movie
2010	Who Da Man?	Larry	Short
2010	Romia and Juliet	Preacher	Short
2011	He's Mine Not Yours	Doug	
2012	Love Overboard	Gerald	Video
2012	Downline	Abel	Short
2013	Je'Caryous Johnson's Marriage Material	Joey	
2013	The Dark Sorcerer	The Goblin	Short
2013	Crazy Sexy Cool: The TLC Story	Antonio "L.A." Reid	TV movie
2013	Marry Me for Christmas	Preston	TV movie
2013	What Would You Do for Love	Stanley	TV movie
2013	At Mamu's Feet	Marshall	
2014	First Impression	Carl	
2014	Love the One You're With	-	TV movie
2014	Marry Us for Christmas	Preston	TV movie
2015	What Love Will Make You Do	Sean	
2015	Zodiac Sign	Jonathan	
2015	My First Love	Damon	Video
2016	Hollywood Hearts	Ric	TV movie
2016	A Heart That Forgives	Levar	
2016	For the Love of Christmas	Johnathan	
2017	Misguided Behavior	Benjamin Fields	
2017	Conflict of Interest	Mark	
2017	Boxing Day: A Day After Christmas	Daymond Brown	
2017	Zulu Wedding	Nate	
2018	Kinship	Rev. Abbot	
2018	Voodoo Vine	Robert	Short
2018	The Come Up	Mr. Armstrong	
2018	One Crazy Christmas	Vincent	
2019	Pride and Prejudice: Atlanta	Reverend Stevie Collins	TV movie
2019	Black Privilege	Chuck	TV movie
2019	Everyday But Christmas	Driver	
2020	Christmas Dilemma	Eddie	TV movie

=== Television ===
Year	Title	Role	Notes
1986–1987	The Cosby Show	Walter "Cockroach" Bradley	Recurring cast: seasons 2–4
1988	Hothouse	Mike Torres	Episode: "The Good Family"
1989	CBS Schoolbreak Special	Danny	Episode: "A Matter of Conscience"
1990	Thirtysomething	Student #1	Episode: "I'm Nobody, Who Are You?"
1990	Hull High	Hull High Devil Rapper	Main cast
1991	You Take the Kids	Spunk	Episode: "Fishes Are Like Sisters... You Can't Flush Them Without Feeling Guilty"
1991	Quantum Leap	Clinton Leveret	Episode: "A Single Drop of Rain"
1991	True Colors	Wishbone	Recurring cast: season 2
1992–1997	Martin	Cole Brown	Main cast
1996	Soul Train	Himself/Guest Host	Episode: "Deborah Cox/Speech/Somethin' for the People"
1999	G vs E	Intern	Episode: "Evilator"
1999	Jack & Jill	Hull High Devil Rapper	Episode: "The Awful Truth" & "Welcome to the Working Week"
2000	The Hughleys	Ernest	Episode: "Darryl's Victory Tour"
2002–2003	George Lopez	Curtis	Recurring cast: season 2
2003–2004	Rock Me Baby	Carl	Main cast
2004	NYPD Blue	Lucas Benchley	Episode: "Bale Out"
2006	The Evidence	Anthony Bishop	Recurring cast
2007	Girlfriends	Ray	Episode: "Time to Man Up"
2009	Nite Tales: The Series	Dirk	Episode: "Black Widow"
2011	Clunkers	Ritchie	Main cast
2012	The Game	Reynaldo Saint James	Recurring cast: season 5
2012–2013	For Richer or Poorer	Deshaun	Main cast
2014	According to Him + Her	Himself	Episode: "Dating 101"
2014	One Love	Luke Winters	Main cast
2015	Make Time 4 Love	Eric Turner	Episode: "Make Time 4 Love Ep. 1"
2017	Mann & Wife	Mr. Wright	Episode: "Take Me to the Mann" & "Pressured by the Mann"
2018	Detroiters	Himself	Episode: "Little Caesars"
2018–2019	Step Up	Reggie Baker	Guest: season 1, recurring cast: season 2
2018–2020	5th Ward The Series	Councilman Kendrick Davis	Main cast
2019	Last Call	Todd Wool	Main cast
2020	Insecure	-	Episode: "Lowkey Feelin' Myself"
2020–2025	Tyler Perry's Young Dylan	Myles Wilson	Main cast
2022	Single Drunk Female	George	Episode: "James"
2022	Kid's Crew	Sandman	Recurring cast

=== Music video appearances ===
- Whodini - "Growing Up" (1986)
- Bobby Brown - "Girl Next Door" (1987)
- History in The Making - "Walk Away" (2011)
