= The Kids Tonight Show =

American late-night talk show

- Genre: Late-night talk show; Variety show
- Presented by: Recker Eans; Dylan Gilmer; Mykal-Michelle Harris; Olivia Perez
- Country of origin: United States
- Original language: English
- No. of seasons: 1
- No. of episodes: 20

Production
- Executive producers: Jimmy Fallon; Lorne Michaels; James Sunderland; Jim Juvonen; Brian McCann; Todd Lubin; Jay Peterson; Mark Efman; Paul Ricci
- Producers: Paige Haaren; Brett Lenhoff; Lauren Mandel
- Production location: NBC Studios
- Camera setup: Multi-camera
- Running time: 10–18 minutes
- Production companies: Matador Content; Electric Hot Dog; Universal Television Alternative

Original release
- Network: Peacock
- Release: October 14 – December 23, 2021

Related
- The Tonight Show Starring Jimmy Fallon

The Kids Tonight Show is an American late-night talk show for children that aired on Peacock from October 14 to December 23, 2021. The series is hosted by Recker Eans, Dylan Gilmer, Mykal-Michelle Harris, and Olivia Perez. On the show, it is referred as "the first talk show for kids by kids" and is based on the long-running late-night talk show The Tonight Show.

== Episodes ==
No.	Guest(s)	Original release date	Prod. code
1	Jimmy Fallon	October 14, 2021	101
2	JoJo Siwa	October 14, 2021	102
3	Questlove and Black Thought	October 21, 2021	103
4	AMP World	October 21, 2021	104
5	Lester Holt	October 28, 2021	105
6	D'Amelio Sisters	October 28, 2021	106
7	Dan White	November 4, 2021	107
8	Kristen Bell	November 4, 2021	108
9	Yara Shahidi	November 11, 2021	109
10	Mike Massimino	November 11, 2021	110
11	Meghan Trainor	November 18, 2021	111
12	Gentry Stein	November 18, 2021	112
13	Celina Smith and Tituss	December 2, 2021	113
14	Bryce Wettstein	December 2, 2021	114
15	Kenan Thompson	December 9, 2021	115
16	Like Nastya and Marc Rebillet	December 9, 2021	116
17	Miranda Cosgrove, Matt Damon and Ninja	December 16, 2021	117
18	Chris Colfer and Zaila Avant-garde	December 16, 2021	118
19	Matthew McConaughey and Nick Kroll	December 23, 2021	119
20	Pressley Hosbach	December 23, 2021	120
