= Sex Sent Me to the ER =

- Genre: Reality; Comedy
- Country of origin: United States
- Original language: English
- No. of seasons: 2
- No. of episodes: 54

Production
- Executive producers: Mark Marinaccio; Michael Branton; Philip Day
- Producers: Sarah Hale; Anne-Lise Jacobsen; Amy Yap Day
- Running time: 42 minutes
- Production company: GRB Entertainment

Original release
- Network: TLC
- Release: December 18, 2013 – March 26, 2016

Sex Sent Me to the ER is an American reality television series aired on TLC that premiered on December 28, 2013. The show features actors who reenact various real-life accidents that occurred during sex. A preview reported on by the New York Post included segments on a 440-pound man who put his 110-pound girlfriend's head through a wall, and a man who broke his penis while having sex with his wife and his girlfriend (who subsequently fought in the emergency room). Samuel Ratsch, who would later become a professional wrestler for AEW under the name Darby Allin, would fabricate a story for the show saying that he had sex with a woman in the woods before rolling onto a bee's nest.
